= List of Paradou AC seasons =

This is a list of the seasons played by Paradou AC from 1994 when the club first entered a league competition to the most recent seasons. The club's achievements in all major national and international competitions as well as the top scorers are listed. Top scorers in bold were also top scorers of Ligue 1. The list is separated into three parts, coinciding with the three major episodes of Algerian football:

== Seasons ==
Season	League									Cup	Other	Africa		Top goalscorer(s) (Note: Goals in all competitions (Algerian Ligue Professionnelle 1, Algerian Cup, League Cup, African and Super Cup) are counted.)		Ref.
Season	Division	Pos	Pts	P	W	D	L	GF	GA	Cup	Other	Africa		Name	Goals	
2003–04	Division 2	3rd	51	30	14	9	7	38	19	Round of 16						
2004–05	Division 2	2nd	63	34	18	9	7	57	35	Round of 32				Lamouri Djediat	14	
2005–06	Division 1	7th	40	30	11	7	12	36	38	Round of 64				Lamouri Djediat	10	
2006–07	Division 1	14th	34	30	8	10	12	31	32	Round of 64				Djamel Bouaicha	9	
2007–08	Division 2	8th	48	36	14	6	16	43	45	Quarter-finals						
2008–09	Division 2	4th	53	32	16	5	11	46	30	Round of 16						
2009–10	Division 2	8th	47	34	12	11	11	32	33	4th regional round						
2010–11	Ligue 2	14th	33	30	8	9	13	32	31	Round of 64						
2011–12	Ligue 2	14th	35	30	9	8	13	34	34	Round of 16						
2012–13	DNA 3	6th	34	26	9	7	10	33	32	Round of 32						
2013–14	DNA 3	9th	37	30	9	10	11	43	42	4th regional round						
2014–15	DNA 3	1st	61	30	17	10	3	52	20	3rd regional round						
2015–16	Ligue 2	4th	46	30	11	13	6	39	25	Quarter-finals				Yacine Benouadah	12	
2016–17	Ligue 2	1st	62	30	19	5	6	43	23	Round of 16				Tayeb Meziani	14	
2017–18	Ligue 1	7th	42	30	12	6	12	35	30	Round of 32				Zakaria Naidji	12	
2018–19	Ligue 1	**3rd**	48	30	14	6	10	38	24	Quarter-finals				Zakaria Naidji	21	
2019–20	Ligue 1 (Note: On March 15, 2020, the Ligue de Football Professionnel (LFP) decided to halt the season due to the COVID-19 pandemic in Algeria. On July 29, 2020, the LFP declared that season is over and CR Belouizdad to be the champion, the promotion of four teams from the League 2, and scrapping the relegation for the current season.)	10th	26	20	7	5	8	20	18	Canceled		Confederation Cup	Grp	Yousri Bouzok	12	
2020–21	Ligue 1	11th	50	38	13	11	14	53	53	Not played	R16			Ahmed Nadhir Benbouali	9	
2021–22	Ligue 1	6th	54	34	16	6	12	43	36	Not played				Benbouali, Bouzok	14	
2022–23	Ligue 1	9th	41	30	11	8	11	35	33	Quarter-finals				Adel Belkacem Bouzida	7	
2023–24	Ligue 1									Round of 32						

== Key ==
Key to league record:

- P = Played
- W = Games won
- D = Games drawn
- L = Games lost
- GF = Goals for
- GA = Goals against
- Pts = Points
- Pos = Final position

Key to divisions:

- 1 = Ligue 1
- 2 = Ligue 2
- 3 = DNA
- 4 = Inter-Régions Division
- 5 = Régionale II

Key to rounds:

- DNE = Did not enter
- Grp = Group stage
- R1 = First Round
- R2 = Second Round
- R32 = Round of 32
- R16 = Round of 16
- QF = Quarter-finals
- SF = Semi-finals
- RU = Runners-up
- W = Winners

Champions	Runners-up	Promoted	Relegated

Division shown in bold to indicate a change in division.
Top scorers shown in bold are players who were also top scorers in their division that season.

== Statistics ==
=== List of All-time appearances ===
This List of All-time appearances for Paradou AC contains football players who have played for Paradou AC and have managed to accrue 100 or more appearances.

Bold Still playing competitive football in Paradou AC.

#	Name	Position	League	Cup	Others^{1}	Africa^{2}	Arab^{3}	TOTAL									
#	Name	Position	League	Cup	Others^{1}	Africa^{2}	Arab^{3}	TOTAL	1	(Algeria) Tarek Bouabta	DF	137	14	0	11	0	162
2	(Algeria) Hamza Mouali	DF	125	10	1	11	0	147									
3	(Algeria) Yousri Bouzok	FW	119	8	0	11	0	138									
4	(Algeria) **Toufik Moussaoui**	GB	108	7	0	12	0	127									
5	(Algeria) Riad Benayad	FW	99	14	0	3	0	116									
6	(Algeria) Mustapha Bouchina	DF	87	13	0	9	0	109									

^{1} ^{Includes the Super Cup and League Cup.} ^{2} ^{Includes the Confederation Cup and Champions League.} ^{3} ^{Includes the UAFA Club Cup.}

=== List of leading goalscorers ===
List of Paradou AC players with 10 or more goals (Note: Since 2016-17 season all goals, Statistics correct as of game against RC Arbaâ on July 15, 2023)
#	Name	Position	League	Cup	Others^{1}	Africa^{2}	Arab^{3}	TOTAL									
#	Name	Position	League	Cup	Others^{1}	Africa^{2}	Arab^{3}	TOTAL	1	(Algeria) Zakaria Naidji	FW	40	2	0	0	0	42
2	(Algeria) Yousri Bouzok	MF	34	2	0	4	0	40									
3	(Algeria) Ahmed Nadhir Benbouali	FW	23	0	0	0	0	23									
4	(Algeria) Riad Benayad	FW	12	6	0	1	0	19									
5	(Algeria) Tayeb Meziani	FW	13	2	0	0	0	15									
6	(Algeria) Merouane Zerrouki	FW	13	1	0	0	0	14									
Own Goals			4	0	0	0	0	4									
**Totals**			**264**	**38**	**0**	**15**	**0**	**317**									

^{1} ^{Includes the Super Cup and League Cup.} ^{2} ^{Includes the Confederation Cup and Champions League.} ^{3} ^{Includes the UAFA Club Cup.}

=== List of managers ===
Information correct as of 25 March 2024. Only competitive matches are counted.

Key
*	Caretaker manager

Name	From	To	Matches	Won	Drawn	Lost	Win%
(Algeria) Kamel Bouhellal	1 July 2003	30 May 2010	226 (Note: Only League matches without the Algerian Cup.)	93	57	76	41.15
(Algeria) Tahar Chérif El-Ouazzani	10 August 2015	7 May 2016	34	14	13	7	41.18
(Spain) Josep María Nogués	1 July 2016	19 May 2018	65	33	14	18	50.77
(Portugal) Francisco Chaló	2 July 2018	16 March 2020	71	32	18	21	45.07
(Algeria) Hakim Malek	26 August 2020	17 January 2021	8	1	6	1	12.5
(France) Pierrick Le Bert	19 January 2021	6 July 2021	22	9	6	7	40.91
(Algeria) Tahar Chérif El-Ouazzani	6 July 2021	17 February 2022	17	10	1	6	58.82
(Algeria) Moulay Azzeggourah ^{*}	18 February 2022	20 March 2022	5	2	2	1	40
(North Macedonia) Boško Gjurovski	21 March 2022	9 May 2022	6	2	2	2	33.33
(Portugal) Francisco Chaló	10 May 2022	2 January 2023	22	5	6	11	22.73
(Algeria) Nadhir Leknaoui	9 January 2023	13 September 2023	18	10	4	4	55.56
(France) Corentin Martins	15 September 2023	31 March 2024	22	9	8	5	40.91

== List of Paradou AC players hat-tricks ==
Position key: GK – Goalkeeper; DF – Defender; MF – Midfielder; FW – Forward; ^{4} – Player scored four goals; * – The home team

Player	Position	Against	Result	Time of goals	Date	League	Ref
(Algeria) Djamel Bouaïcha^{4}	FW	CA Batna	6–3	21', 28', 57', 80'	11 June 2007	Division 1	
(Algeria) Merouane Zerrouki	FW	MC Oran	5–4	47', 55', 68'	27 July 2021	Ligue Professionnelle 1	
