= 2016–17 Paradou AC season =

Paradou AC
2016–17 season
- President: Kheiredine Zetchi
- Head coach: Josep María Nogués (from 1 July 2016)
- Stadium: Omar Benrabah Stadium
- Ligue 2: 1st
- Algerian Cup: Round of 16
- Top goalscorer: League: Tayeb Meziani (12 goals); All: Tayeb Meziani (14 goals)

In the 2016–17 season, Paradou AC is competing in the Ligue 2 for the 9th season.

== Squad list ==
Players and squad numbers last updated on 15 November 2016.
Note: Flags indicate national team as has been defined under FIFA eligibility rules. Players may hold more than one non-FIFA nationality.

| No. | Nat. | Position | Name | Date of Birth (Age) | Signed from |
Goalkeepers
| 1 | (Algeria) | GK | Mokhtar Ferrahi | 24 January 1996 (aged 20) | (Algeria) Youth system |
| 16 | (Algeria) | GK | Billel Boufeneche | 18 September 1988 (aged 28) | (Algeria) CRB Aïn Fakroun |
| 30 | (Algeria) | GK | Toufik Moussaoui | 20 April 1991 (aged 25) | (Algeria) JS Hai Djabel |
Defenders
| | (Algeria) | CB | Smaïl Chaoui | 11 February 1982 (aged 34) | (Algeria) Unattached |
| | (Algeria) | CB | Tarek Bouabta | 21 July 1991 (aged 25) | (Algeria) JSM Béjaïa |
| | (Algeria) | CB | Islam Chahrour | 20 March 1990 (aged 26) | (Algeria) JSM Chéraga |
| | (Algeria) | CB | Mustapha Bouchina | 10 August 1991 (aged 25) | (Algeria) Youth system |
| | (Algeria) | RB | Toufik Bouhafer | 15 May 1985 (aged 31) | (Algeria) ESM Koléa |
| | (Algeria) | RB | Islam Arous | 6 August 1996 (aged 20) | (Algeria) Youth system |
| | (Algeria) | RB | Faycal Kherifi | 5 December 1986 (aged 30) | (Algeria) MO Constantine |
| | (Algeria) | RB | Aimen Bouguerra | 10 January 1997 (aged 19) | (Algeria) Youth system |
| | (Algeria) | RB | Youcef Atal | 17 May 1996 (aged 20) | (Algeria) Youth system |
| | (Algeria) | LB | Sabri Cheraitia | 23 March 1996 (aged 20) | (Algeria) Youth system |
Midfielders
| | (Algeria) | MF | Youcef Islam Herida | 25 July 1991 (aged 25) | (Algeria) RC Kouba |
| | (Algeria) | MF | Abdelkrim Oudni | 11 August 1982 (aged 34) | (Algeria) USMM Hadjout |
| | (Algeria) | MF | Ahmed Gagaâ | 14 January 1994 (aged 22) | (Algeria) JS Kabylie Loan return |
| | (Algeria) | MF | Taher Benkhelifa | 10 June 1994 (aged 22) | (Algeria) Youth system |
| | (Algeria) | MF | Zakaria Messibah | 16 October 1995 (aged 21) | (Algeria) Youth system |
| | (Algeria) | MF | Tayeb Hamoudi | 10 February 1995 (aged 21) | (Algeria) Youth system |
| | (Algeria) | MF | Lyes Benyoucef | 2 March 1996 (aged 20) | (Algeria) Youth system |
| | (Algeria) | MF | Mustapha Sedjrari | 5 September 1995 (aged 21) | (Algeria) Youth system |
| | (Algeria) | MF | Zakaria Mansouri | 1 November 1995 (aged 21) | (Algeria) Youth system |
Forwards
| | (Algeria) | FW | Yousri Bouzok | 18 August 1996 (aged 20) | (Algeria) Youth system |
| | (Algeria) | FW | Farid El Melali | 5 May 1997 (aged 19) | (Algeria) Youth system |
| | (Algeria) | FW | Abdelmehdi Droueche | 20 May 1995 (aged 21) | (Algeria) Youth system |
| | (Algeria) | FW | Yacine Benouadah | 10 June 1987 (aged 29) | (Algeria) Youth system |
| | (Algeria) | FW | Zakaria Naidji | 19 January 1995 (aged 21) | (Algeria) USM El Harrach Loan return |
| | (Algeria) | FW | Tayeb Meziani | 27 February 1996 (aged 20) | (Algeria) Youth system |
| | (Algeria) | FW | Riad Benayad | 27 February 1996 (aged 20) | (Algeria) Youth system |
| | (Algeria) | FW | Abdelmalek Meftahi | 17 April 1992 (aged 24) | (Algeria) JSM Chéraga |

== Competitions ==
=== Overview ===
| Competition | Record | | | | | | | | Started round | Final position / round | First match | Last match |
| Competition | G | W | D | L | GF | GA | GD | Win % | Started round | Final position / round | First match | Last match |
|---|---|---|---|---|---|---|---|---|---|---|---|---|
| Ligue 2 | 30 | 19 | 5 | 6 | 43 | 23 | +20 | 63.33 | — | To be confirmed | 9 September 2016 | In Progress |
| Algerian Cup | 3 | 1 | 2 | 0 | 5 | 3 | +2 | 33.33 | Round of 64 | Round of 16 | 25 November 2016 | 28 December 2016 |
| Total | 33 | 20 | 7 | 6 | 48 | 26 | +22 | 60.61 | | | | |

Updated to match played 7 March 2020
Source: Competitions

== League table ==
| Pos | Team | Pld | W | D | L | GF | GA | GD | Pts | Qualification or relegation |
|---|---|---|---|---|---|---|---|---|---|---|
| 1 | Paradou AC (P) | 30 | 19 | 5 | 6 | 43 | 23 | +20 | 62 | 2017–18 Algerian Ligue Professionnelle 1 |
| 2 | USM Blida (P) | 30 | 14 | 9 | 7 | 31 | 19 | +12 | 51 | 2017–18 Algerian Ligue Professionnelle 1 |
| 3 | US Biskra (P) | 30 | 15 | 6 | 9 | 36 | 26 | +10 | 51 | 2017–18 Algerian Ligue Professionnelle 1 |
| 4 | JSM Béjaïa | 30 | 13 | 7 | 10 | 33 | 30 | +3 | 46 | |
| 5 | JSM Skikda | 30 | 13 | 6 | 11 | 33 | 23 | +10 | 45 | |

Updated to match(es) played on 6 May 2016. Source: DZFOOT.COM
Rules for classification: 1) points; 2) goal difference; 3) number of goals scored.
(P) Promoted

=== Results summary ===
| Overall | | | | | | | | Home | | | | | | Away | | | | | |
| Pld | W | D | L | GF | GA | GD | Pts | W | D | L | GF | GA | GD | W | D | L | GF | GA | GD |
|---|---|---|---|---|---|---|---|---|---|---|---|---|---|---|---|---|---|---|---|
| 30 | 19 | 5 | 6 | 43 | 22 | +21 | 62 | 11 | 2 | 2 | 27 | 9 | +18 | 8 | 3 | 4 | 16 | 13 | +3 |

Last updated: 22 April 2018.
Source: Competitive matches

=== Results by round ===
| Round | 1 | 2 | 3 | 4 | 5 | 6 | 7 | 8 | 9 | 10 | 11 | 12 | 13 | 14 | 15 | 16 | 17 | 18 | 19 | 20 | 21 | 22 | 23 | 24 | 25 | 26 | 27 | 28 | 29 | 30 |
|---|---|---|---|---|---|---|---|---|---|---|---|---|---|---|---|---|---|---|---|---|---|---|---|---|---|---|---|---|---|---|
| Ground | A | H | A | A | H | A | H | A | H | A | H | A | H | A | H | H | A | H | H | A | H | A | H | A | H | A | H | A | H | A |
| Result | D | W | W | D | W | W | W | D | D | L | W | W | W | W | W | W | L | D | W | W | L | W | W | L | W | W | L | W | W | L |
| Position | 5 | 3 | 1 | 1 | 1 | 1 | 1 | 1 | 2 | 2 | 1 | 1 | 1 | 1 | 1 | 1 | 1 | 1 | 1 | 1 | 1 | 1 | 1 | 1 | 1 | 1 | 1 | 1 | 1 | 1 |

Updated to match(es) played on 22 April 2020. Source: Competitive matches
A = Away; H = Home; W = Win; D = Draw; L = Loss

=== Matches ===
Win Draw Loss

| 9 September 2016 Round 1 | CRB Aïn Fakroun | 1–1 | Paradou AC | Aïn Fakroun |
| 17:00 | Youcef Khoudja 53' | Report | Naidji 63' | Stadium: Stade des Frères Demane-Debbih |

| 16 September 2016 Round 2 | Paradou AC | 4–0 | MC El Eulma | Bologhine |
| 17:00 | Atal 17'; Naidji 19', 51'; Droueche 71' | Report | | Stadium: Stade Omar Hamadi |

| 23 September 2016 Round 3 | MC Saïda | 0–1 | Paradou AC | Saïda |
| 17:00 | | Report | Atal 32' | Stadium: Stade 13 Avril 1958 |

| 30 September 2016 Round 4 | USM Blida | 1–1 | Paradou AC | Blida |
| 17:00 | Zerguine 16' | Report | Naidji 90' | Stadium: Stade Frères Brakni |

| 7 October 2016 Round 5 | Paradou AC | 2–1 | RC Arbaâ | Bologhine |
| 17:00 | Benouadah 7'; Naidji 44' | Report | Achiou 66' | Stadium: Stade Omar Hamadi |

| 14 October 2016 Round 6 | GC Mascara | 1–2 | Paradou AC | Mascara |
| 17:00 | Benmeghit 10' | Report | Benouadah 48'; Meziani 82' | Stadium: Stade de l'Unité Africaine |

| 21 October 2016 Round 7 | Paradou AC | 4–1 | US Biskra | Bologhine |
| 17:00 | Meziani 5', 63'; Benouadah 16'; Naidji 41' | Report | Allati 90' | Stadium: Stade Omar Hamadi |

| 28 October 2016 Round 8 | WA Boufarik | 0–0 | Paradou AC | Boufarik |
| 17:00 | | Report | | Stadium: Stade Mohamed Reggaz |

| 11 November 2016 Round 9 | Paradou AC | 1–1 | ASM Oran | Bologhine |
| 16:00 | Bouabta 88' | Report | Belalem 90' | Stadium: Stade Omar Hamadi |

| 18 November 2016 Round 10 | A Bou Saâda | 3–0 | Paradou AC | Bou Saâda |
| 16:00 | Chaouti 2', 22'; Bentaleb 9' | Report | | Stadium: Stade Mokhtar Abdelatif |

| 2 December 2016 Round 11 | Paradou AC | 3–1 | AS Khroub | Bologhine |
| 16:00 | Meziani 2'; Bouabta 12'; Benyoucef 29' | Report | Sayah 57' | Stadium: Stade Omar Hamadi |

| 6 December 2016 Round 12 | ASO Chlef | 0–2 | Paradou AC | Chlef |
| 16:00 | | Report | Benkhelifa 11'; Benyoucef 81' | Stadium: Stade Mohamed Boumezrag |

| 10 December 2016 Round 13 | Paradou AC | 1–0 | CA Bordj Bou Arréridj | Bologhine |
| 16:00 | Naidji 17' | Report | | Stadium: Stade Omar Hamadi |

| 20 December 2016 Round 14 | JSM Béjaïa | 1–2 | Paradou AC | Béjaïa |
| 16:00 | Ounnas 2' | Report | Bouabta 47'; Meziani 66' | Stadium: Stade de l'Unité Maghrébine |

| 24 December 2016 Round 15 | Paradou AC | 1–0 | JSM Skikda | Bologhine |
| 16:00 | Mansouri 64' | Report | | Stadium: Stade Omar Hamadi |

| 13 January 2017 Round 16 | Paradou AC | 1–0 | CRB Aïn Fakroun | Bologhine |
| 17:00 | Benayad 2' | Report | | Stadium: Stade Omar Hamadi |

| 31 March 2017 Round 17 | MC El Eulma | 2–0 | Paradou AC | El Eulma |
| 17:00 | Zitouni 34'; Belhamri 73' | Report | | Stadium: Stade Messaoud Zougar |

| 28 January 2017 Round 18 | Paradou AC | 0–0 | MC Saïda | Bologhine |
| 17:00 | | Report | | Stadium: Stade Omar Hamadi; Referee: Bilal Bendjahene |

| 3 February 2017 Round 19 | Paradou AC | 2–1 | USM Blida | Bologhine |
| 17:00 | El Melali 22'; Meziani 90' | Report | Hamiti 66' | Stadium: Stade Omar Hamadi; Referee: Amine Hansal |

| 10 February 2017 Round 20 | RC Arbaâ | 0–1 | Paradou AC | Larbaâ |
| 17:00 | | Report | Meziani 24' | Stadium: Stade Ismaïl Makhlouf; Referee: Benabdella, Loumari, Bouabdallah |

| 17 February 2017 Round 21 | Paradou AC | 0–1 | GC Mascara | Bologhine |
| 17:00 | | Report | Hachem 66' | Stadium: Stade Omar Hamadi; Referee: Youcef Gamouh |

| 24 February 2017 Round 22 | US Biskra | 0–1 | Paradou AC | Biskra |
| 17:00 | | Report | Meziani 11' | Stadium: Stade du 18 Février; Referee: Mustapha Ghorbal |

| 3 March 2017 Round 23 | Paradou AC | 3–0 | WA Boufarik | Bologhine |
| 17:00 | Meziani 9', 84'; Droueche 65' | Report | | Stadium: Stade Omar Hamadi; Referee: Oukil, Ait Saadi, Bensenouci |

| 10 March 2017 Round 24 | ASM Oran | 1–0 | Paradou AC | Oran |
| 17:00 | Ziaya 41' | Report | | Stadium: Stade Habib Bouakeul; Referee: Houssam Benyahia |

| 17 March 2017 Round 25 | Paradou AC | 3–1 | A Bou Saâda | Bologhine |
| 17:00 | Atal 15'; Bentaleb 28' (o.g.); Chahrour 42' | Report | Nait Slimani 4' | Stadium: Stade Omar Hamadi; Referee: Merzoug Brahimi |

| 24 March 2017 Round 26 | AS Khroub | 0–2 | Paradou AC | El Khroub |
| 17:00 | | Report | Meziani 75', 90' | Stadium: Stade Abed Hamdani; Referee: Bouzar, Lahmi, Boufassa |

| 7 April 2017 Round 27 | Paradou AC | 0–1 | ASO Chlef | Bologhine |
| 17:00 | | Report | Yadroudj 77' | Stadium: Stade Omar Hamadi |

| 22 April 2017 Round 28 | CA Bordj Bou Arréridj | 1–2 | Paradou AC | Bordj Bou Arréridj |
| 17:00 | Djahnit 6' | Report | El Melali 41', 44' | Stadium: Stade 20 Août 1955 |

| 29 April 2017 Round 29 | Paradou AC | 2–1 | JSM Béjaïa | Bologhine |
| 17:00 | El Melali 84'; Naidji 88' | Report | Allali 31' | Stadium: Stade Omar Hamadi |

| 13 May 2017 Round 30 | JSM Skikda | 3–1 | Paradou AC | Skikda |
| 17:00 | Cheniguer 5'; Berramla 13'; Khazri 15' | Report | Naidji 78' | Stadium: Stade 20 Août 1955 |

== Algerian Cup ==
| 25 November 2016 Round of 64 | ORB Oued Fodda | 1–3 | Paradou AC | Chlef |
| 15:00 | Chorfi 78' | | Benayad 45'; Meziani 47', 52' | Stadium: Stade Mohamed Boumezrag; Attendance: 0 (close doors); Referee: Houssam Benyahia |

| 17 December 2016 Round of 32 | USM Khenchela | 2–2 (a.e.t.) (3–4 p) | Paradou AC | Khenchela |
| 14:30 | Chekhrite 9'; El Aïdani 75' | | Benouadah 15'; Mansouri 35' (pen.) | Stadium: Stade Hamem Amar; Referee: Bilal Bendjahene |

| 28 December 2016 Round of 16 | Paradou AC | 0–0 (a.e.t.) (5–6 p) | NA Hussein Dey | Dar El Beïda |
| 14:30 | | | | Stadium: Omar Benrabah Stadium; Referee: Mohamed Benouza |
| | Penalties |
| | Benouadah (penalty scored); Benyoucef (penalty scored); Messibah (penalty scored); Bouabta (penalty scored); Mansouri (penalty scored); Benkhelifa (penalty missed) | | (penalty scored) Abid; (penalty scored) Ardji; (penalty scored) Zeddam; (penalty scored) Bendebka; (penalty scored) Khiat; (penalty scored) Ouali |

== Squad information ==
=== Playing statistics ===
| No. | Pos | Nat | Player | Total | | Ligue 2 | | Algerian Cup | |
| No. | Pos | Nat | Player | Apps | Goals | Apps | Goals | Apps | Goals |
Goalkeepers
| 16 | GK | (Algeria) ALG | Billel Boufeneche | 3 | 0 | 1 | 0 | 2 | 0 |
| 30 | GK | (Algeria) ALG | Toufik Moussaoui | 29 | 0 | 28 | 0 | 1 | 0 |
| | GK | (Algeria) ALG | Mokhtar Ferrahi | 1 | 0 | 1 | 0 | 0 | 0 |
Defenders
| 5 | DF | (Algeria) ALG | Smaïl Chaoui | 24 | 0 | 23 | 0 | 1 | 0 |
| 22 | DF | (Algeria) ALG | Tarek Bouabta | 31 | 3 | 29 | 3 | 2 | 0 |
| 19 | DF | (Algeria) ALG | Islam Chahrour | 25 | 1 | 22 | 1 | 3 | 0 |
| 6 | DF | (Algeria) ALG | Mustapha Bouchina | 7 | 0 | 7 | 0 | 0 | 0 |
| 11 | DF | (Algeria) ALG | Toufik Bouhafer | 7 | 0 | 6 | 0 | 1 | 0 |
| | DF | (Algeria) ALG | Islam Arous | 13 | 0 | 11 | 0 | 2 | 0 |
| 20 | DF | (Algeria) ALG | Faycal Kherifi | 23 | 0 | 21 | 0 | 2 | 0 |
| | DF | (Algeria) ALG | Aimen Bouguerra | 1 | 0 | 1 | 0 | 0 | 0 |
| 31 | DF | (Algeria) ALG | Youcef Atal | 24 | 3 | 23 | 3 | 1 | 0 |
| | DF | (Algeria) ALG | Sabri Cheraitia | 2 | 0 | 2 | 0 | 0 | 0 |
Midfielders
| 21 | MF | (Algeria) ALG | Abdelkrim Oudni | 7 | 0 | 6 | 0 | 1 | 0 |
| 29 | MF | (Algeria) ALG | Ahmed Gagaâ | 15 | 0 | 14 | 0 | 1 | 0 |
| 17 | MF | (Algeria) ALG | Taher Benkhelifa | 28 | 1 | 26 | 1 | 2 | 0 |
| 43 | MF | (Algeria) ALG | Zakaria Messibah | 26 | 0 | 24 | 0 | 2 | 0 |
| 8 | MF | (Algeria) ALG | Tayeb Hamoudi | 5 | 0 | 5 | 0 | 0 | 0 |
| 33 | MF | (Algeria) ALG | Lyes Benyoucef | 20 | 2 | 17 | 2 | 3 | 0 |
| | MF | (Algeria) ALG | Mustapha Sedjrari | 3 | 0 | 3 | 0 | 0 | 0 |
Forwards
| | FW | (Algeria) ALG | Yousri Bouzok | 4 | 0 | 4 | 0 | 0 | 0 |
| 41 | FW | (Algeria) ALG | Farid El Melali | 18 | 4 | 16 | 4 | 2 | 0 |
| 18 | FW | (Algeria) ALG | Abdelmehdi Droueche | 30 | 2 | 27 | 2 | 3 | 0 |
| 7 | FW | (Algeria) ALG | Yacine Benouadah | 26 | 4 | 24 | 3 | 2 | 1 |
| 24 | FW | (Algeria) ALG | Zakaria Naidji | 21 | 9 | 19 | 9 | 2 | 0 |
| 25 | FW | (Algeria) ALG | Tayeb Meziani | 29 | 14 | 26 | 12 | 3 | 2 |
| 36 | FW | (Algeria) ALG | Riad Benayad | 16 | 2 | 13 | 1 | 3 | 1 |
Players transferred out during the season
| | DF | (Algeria) ALG | Youcef Islam Herida | 3 | 0 | 3 | 0 | 0 | 0 |
| | MF | (Algeria) ALG | Zakaria Mansouri | 12 | 2 | 9 | 1 | 3 | 1 |
| | FW | (Algeria) ALG | Abdelmalek Meftahi | 1 | 0 | 1 | 0 | 0 | 0 |

Last updated: 8 May 2021

=== Goalscorers ===
Includes all competitive matches. The list is sorted alphabetically by surname when total goals are equal.

| No. | Nat. | Player | Pos. | L 2 | AC | TOTAL |
|---|---|---|---|---|---|---|
| 25 | (Algeria) | Tayeb Meziani | FW | 12 | 2 | 14 |
| 24 | (Algeria) | Zakaria Naidji | FW | 9 | 0 | 9 |
| 7 | (Algeria) | Yacine Benouadah | FW | 3 | 1 | 4 |
| 41 | (Algeria) | Farid El Melali | FW | 4 | 0 | 4 |
| 22 | (Algeria) | Tarek Bouabta | DF | 3 | 0 | 3 |
| 31 | (Algeria) | Youcef Atal | DF | 3 | 0 | 3 |
| 18 | (Algeria) | Abdelmehdi Droueche | FW | 2 | 0 | 2 |
| 36 | (Algeria) | Riad Benayad | FW | 1 | 1 | 2 |
| | (Algeria) | Zakaria Mansouri | MF | 1 | 1 | 2 |
| 33 | (Algeria) | Lyes Benyoucef | MF | 2 | 0 | 2 |
| 17 | (Algeria) | Taher Benkhelifa | MF | 1 | 0 | 1 |
| 19 | (Algeria) | Islam Chahrour | DF | 1 | 0 | 1 |
| Own Goals | | | | 1 | 0 | 1 |
| Totals | | | | 43 | 5 | 48 |

== Transfers ==
=== Out ===
| Date | Pos | Player | To club | Transfer fee | Source |
|---|---|---|---|---|---|
| 11 June 2016 | FW | (Algeria) Zakaria Mansouri | MC Alger | Undisclosed | |
| 11 June 2016 | CB | (Algeria) Raouf Benguit | USM Alger | Loan end of season + €50,000 | |
