= 2018–19 Paradou AC season =

Paradou AC
2018–19 season
- Chairman: Hassen Zetchi
- Head coach: Francisco Chaló (from 2 July 2018)
- Stadium: Stade Omar Hamadi, Bologhine
- Ligue 1: 3rd
- Algerian Cup: Quarter-finals
- Top goalscorer: League: Zakaria Naidji (20); All: Zakaria Naidji (21)

In the 2018–19 season, Paradou AC competed in Ligue 1 for the 4th season, as well as the Algerian Cup.

== Mid-season ==
=== Overview ===
Competition	Record								Started round	Final position / round	First match	Last match
Competition	G	W	D	L	GF	GA	GD	Win %	Started round	Final position / round	First match	Last match
Ligue 1	30	14	6	10	35	23	+12	46.67	—N/a	3rd	13 August 2018	26 May 2019
Algerian Cup	5	3	2	0	9	3	+6	60.00	Round of 64	Quarter-finals	18 December 2018	30 March 2019
Total	35	17	8	10	44	26	+18	48.57				

Updated to match played 28 May 2019
Source: Competitions

== League table ==
Pos	Team	Pld	W	D	L	GF	GA	GD	Pts	Qualification or relegation
1	USM Alger (C)	30	15	8	7	49	29	+20	53	Qualification for Champions League
2	JS Kabylie	30	15	7	8	38	25	+13	52	Qualification for Champions League
3	Paradou AC	30	14	6	10	38	24	+14	48	Qualification for Confederation Cup
4	JS Saoura	30	13	8	9	33	22	+11	47	Qualification for Arab Club Champions Cup
5	ES Sétif	30	13	6	11	34	24	+10	45	

Source: DZFoot
Rules for classification: 1) points; 2) head-to-head points; 3) head-to-head goal difference; 4) goal difference; 5) total goals; 6) fairplay ranking; 7) playoff.
(C) Champions

=== Results summary ===
Overall								Home						Away					
Pld	W	D	L	GF	GA	GD	Pts	W	D	L	GF	GA	GD	W	D	L	GF	GA	GD
30	14	6	10	38	24	+14	48	11	1	3	27	9	+18	3	5	7	11	15	−4

Last updated: 28 May 2018.
Source: Competitive matches

=== Results by round ===
Round	1	2	3	4	5	6	7	8	9	10	11	12	13	14	15	16	17	18	19	20	21	22	23	24	25	26	27	28	29	30
Ground	A	H	A	H	A	H	A	H	A	H	A	H	A	H	A	H	A	H	A	H	A	H	A	H	A	H	A	H	A	H
Result	D	D	D	W	L	W	L	L	L	W	D	W	D	W	L	L	D	W	W	W	W	W	W	W	L	W	L	L	L	W
Position	11	8	11	6	12	5	6	10	13	9	9	8	8	5	7	8	8	7	7	5	3	3	3	2	2	2	2	3	3	3

Updated to match(es) played on 16 May 2019. Source: Competitive matches
A = Away; H = Home; W = Win; D = Draw; L = Loss

=== Matches ===
Win Draw Loss

13 August 2018 Round 1	MC Alger	1–1	Paradou AC	Algiers
20:00	Derrardja 79' (pen.)	Soccerway report	Naidji 65'	Stadium: July 5, 1962 Stadium; Referee: Lotfi Bekouassa

18 August 2018 Round 2	Paradou AC	0–0	CR Belouizdad	Bologhine
21:00		Soccerway report		Stadium: Omar Hamadi Stadium; Referee: Merzoug Brahimi

1 September 2018 Round 4	Paradou AC	3–0	Olympique de Médéa	Bologhine
17:00	Naidji 24', 68'; Cheraitia 57'	Soccerway report		Stadium: Omar Hamadi Stadium; Referee: Redouane Necib

4 September 2018 Round 3	ES Sétif	1–1	Paradou AC	Sétif
21:00	Bouguelmouna 88' (pen.)	Soccerway report	Naidji 60'	Stadium: Stade 8 Mai 1945; Referee: Said Aouina

11 September 2018 Round 5	JS Kabylie	1–0	Paradou AC	Tizi Ouzou
17:45	Hamroune 85'	Soccerway report		Stadium: November 1, 1954 Stadium; Referee: Mohamed Saïdi

15 September 2018 Round 6	Paradou AC	3–2	MC Oran	Bologhine
19:00	Naidji 50', 70'; Bouzok 70' (pen.)	Soccerway report	Mekkaoui 19'; Mansouri 22' (pen.)	Stadium: Omar Hamadi Stadium; Referee: Ahmed Bouzrar

21 September 2018 Round 7	CS Constantine	2–0	Paradou AC	Constantine
17:00	Belkacemi 60', 77'	Soccerway report		Stadium: Stade Mohamed Hamlaoui; Referee: Abderrezzak Arab

29 September 2018 Round 8	Paradou AC	1–3	USM Alger	Bologhine
17:45	Meziani 48'	Soccerway report	Ibara 19'; Cherifi 58'; Benguit 59'	Stadium: Omar Hamadi Stadium; Referee: Mustapha Ghorbal

5 October 2018 Round 9	NA Hussein Dey	2–1	Paradou AC	Belouizdad
16:00	Chouiter 73'; Gasmi 75'	Soccerway report	Naidji 51'	Stadium: Stade 20 Août 1955; Referee: Merzoug Brahimi

19 October 2018 Round 11	JS Saoura	2–2	Paradou AC	Béchar
19:00	Boulaouidet 44'; Djallit 86'	Soccerway report	Bouabta 55'; Zorgane 82'	Stadium: Stade 20 Août 1955; Referee: Abderrezzak Arab

30 October 2018 Round 12	Paradou AC	3–0	MO Béjaïa	Bologhine
18:00	Benayad 34', 63'; Naidji 53'	Soccerway report		Stadium: Omar Hamadi Stadium; Referee: Redouane Necib

6 November 2018 Round 13	USM Bel Abbès	1–1	Paradou AC	Sidi Bel Abbès
17:00	Tabti 20'	Soccerway report	Zorgane 64'	Stadium: Stade 24 Fevrier 1956; Referee: Rafik Achouri

10 November 2018 Round 14	Paradou AC	3–0	AS Ain M'lila	Bologhine
18:00	Naidji 1'; Mouali 61'; Bouzok 90+2'	Soccerway report		Stadium: Omar Hamadi Stadium; Referee: Mustapha Bessiri

16 November 2018 Round 10	Paradou AC	2–0	CA Bordj Bou Arreridj	Bologhine
16:00	Benayad 24'; Naidji 43'	Soccerway report		Stadium: Omar Hamadi Stadium; Referee: Mohamed Saïdi

22 November 2018 Round 15	DRB Tadjenanet	1–0	Paradou AC	Tadjenanet
18:00	Terbah 70'	Soccerway report		Stadium: Lahoua Smaïl Stadium; Referee: Mustapha Ghorbal

5 January 2019 Round 16	Paradou AC	0–1	MC Alger	Bologhine
17:45		Soccerway report	Mebarakou 45'	Stadium: Omar Hamadi Stadium; Referee: Lyés Bekouassa

12 January 2019 Round 17	CR Belouizdad	0–0	Paradou AC	Belouizdad
15:00		Soccerway report		Stadium: Stade 20 Août 1955; Referee: Mohamed Saïdi

18 January 2019 Round 18	Paradou AC	1–0	ES Sétif	Bologhine
17:45	Naidji 77'	Soccerway report		Stadium: Omar Hamadi Stadium; Referee: Mustapha Bessiri

26 January 2019 Round 19	Olympique de Médéa	0–1	Paradou AC	Médéa
15:00		Soccerway report	Boudaoui 75'	Stadium: Stade Imam Lyes de Médéa; Referee: Abderrezzak Arab

4 February 2019 Round 20	Paradou AC	2–0	JS Kabylie	Bologhine
17:45	Naidji 72', 85'	Soccerway report		Stadium: Omar Hamadi Stadium; Referee: Rafik Achouri

8 February 2019 Round 21	MC Oran	0–2	Paradou AC	Oran
16:00		Soccerway report	Naidji 71', 79'	Stadium: Ahmed Zabana Stadium; Referee: Mehdi Abid Charef

12 February 2019 Round 22	Paradou AC	1–0	CS Constantine	Bologhine
17:45	Benayad 25'	Soccerway report		Stadium: Omar Hamadi Stadium; Referee: Mohamed Saïdi

2 March 2019 Round 23	USM Alger	1–2	Paradou AC	Bologhine
17:00	Ibara 12'	Soccerway report	Naidji 48'; Tahri 68'	Stadium: Omar Hamadi Stadium; Referee: Mustapha Ghorbal

4 April 2019 Round 25	CA Bordj Bou Arreridj	1–0	Paradou AC	Bordj Bou Arréridj
18:00	Amrane 59'	Soccerway report		Stadium: Stade 20 Août 1955; Referee: Ahmed Bouzrar

21 April 2019 Round 26	Paradou AC	2–0	JS Saoura	Bologhine
16:00	Naidji 44'; Bouzok 76'	Soccerway report		Stadium: Omar Hamadi Stadium; Referee: Mustapha Ghorbal

27 April 2019 Round 24	Paradou AC	2–1	NA Hussein Dey	Bologhine
16:00	Bouzok 35'; Naidji 76'	Soccerway report	Brahimi 81'	Stadium: Omar Hamadi Stadium; Referee: Missoum Benabdellah

11 May 2019 Round 27	MO Béjaïa	1–0	Paradou AC	Béjaïa
22:30	Mazari 80'	Soccerway report		Stadium: Stade de l'Unité Maghrébine; Referee: Mehdi Abid Charef

16 May 2019 Round 28	Paradou AC	1–2	USM Bel Abbès	Bologhine
22:30	Loucif 17'	Soccerway report	Seguer 49'; Belhocini 77'	Stadium: Omar Hamadi Stadium; Referee: Redouane Necib

21 May 2019 Round 29	AS Ain M'lila	1–0	Paradou AC	Aïn M'lila
16:00	Tiaïba 45+1'	Soccerway report		Stadium: Stade Khelifi Touhami Zoubir; Referee: Mohamed Saïdi

26 May 2019 Round 30	Paradou AC	3–0	DRB Tadjenanet	Bologhine
22:30	Benayad 16', 65'; Naidji 18'	Soccerway report		Stadium: Omar Hamadi Stadium; Referee: Mustapha Bessiri

== Algerian Cup ==
18 December 2018 Round of 64	USM Blida	2–3 (a.e.t.)	Paradou AC	Blida
15:00	Zerguine 65'; Aliouet 90+4'		2' Benayad; 14' Herrari; 105' Bouguerra	Stadium: Stade Mustapha Tchaker; Referee: Ali Nader

30 December 2018 Round of 32	US Béni Douala	0–2	Paradou AC	Tizi Ouzou
15:00			46' Loucif; 54' Benayad	Stadium: 1 November 1954 Stadium; Referee: Mustapha Bessiri

22 January 2019 Round of 16	Paradou AC	3–0	USM El Harrach	Bologhine
14:30	Naidji 51'; Loucif 90+1'; Benayad 90+3'			Stadium: Omar Hamadi Stadium; Referee: Farouk Mial

9 March 2019 QF 1st leg	JSM Béjaïa	0–0	Paradou AC	Béjaïa
17:00				Stadium: Stade de l'Unité Maghrébine; Referee: Mustapha Bessiri

30 March 2019 QF 2nd leg	Paradou AC	1–1	JSM Béjaïa	Bologhine
15:00	Zorgane 37'		Daouadji 49'	Stadium: Omar Hamadi Stadium; Referee: Ali Nader

== Squad information ==
=== Playing statistics ===
No.	Pos	Nat	Player	Total		Ligue 1		Algerian Cup	
No.	Pos	Nat	Player	Apps	Goals	Apps	Goals	Apps	Goals
Goalkeepers
30	GK	(Algeria) ALG	Toufik Moussaoui	35	0	30	0	5	0
1	GK	(Algeria) ALG	Mokhtar Ferrahi	0	0	0	0	0	0
Defenders
17	DF	(Algeria) ALG	Anis Bey	2	0	2	0	0	0
22	DF	(Algeria) ALG	Tarek Bouabta	34	1	29	1	5	0
6	DF	(Algeria) ALG	Mustapha Bouchina	28	0	23	0	5	0
25	DF	(Algeria) ALG	Aimen Bouguerra	16	1	12	0	4	1
21	DF	(Algeria) ALG	Sabri Cheraitia	24	1	21	1	3	0
5	DF	(Algeria) ALG	Youcef Douar	12	0	9	0	3	0
12	DF	(Algeria) ALG	Haithem Loucif	33	3	28	1	5	2
	DF	(Algeria) ALG	Hamza Mouali	30	1	25	1	5	0
	DF	(Algeria) ALG	Abdeldjalil Tahri	29	1	25	1	4	0
Midfielders
34	MF	(Algeria) ALG	Hicham Boudaoui	33	1	30	1	3	0
26	MF	(Algeria) ALG	Yousri Bouzok	26	4	23	4	3	0
	MF	(Algeria) ALG	Mohamed Zakaria Hambli	1	0	1	0	0	0
4	MF	(Algeria) ALG	Tayeb Hamoudi	27	0	24	0	3	0
	MF	(Algeria) ALG	Ishak Salah Eddine Harrari	8	1	6	0	2	1
15	MF	(Algeria) ALG	Zakaria Messibah	23	0	20	0	3	0
90	MF	(Algeria) ALG	Adem Zorgane	30	3	25	2	5	1
Forwards
9	FW	(Algeria) ALG	Riad Benayad	34	8	29	5	5	3
	FW	(Algeria) ALG	Abdelkader Ghorab	5	0	3	0	2	0
	FW	(Algeria) ALG	Ghiles Guenaoui	5	0	4	0	1	0
24	FW	(Algeria) ALG	Zakaria Naidji	33	21	30	20	3	1
28	FW	(Algeria) ALG	Adem Redjem	3	0	3	0	0	0
Players transferred out during the season
10	FW	(Algeria) ALG	Tayeb Meziani	7	1	7	1	0	0

Last updated: 5 July 2018
Source: fr.soccerway.com

== Squad list ==
As of August 11, 2018. Note: Flags indicate national team as defined under FIFA eligibility rules; some limited exceptions apply. Players may hold more than one non-FIFA nationality.

No.	Pos.	Nation	Player
1	GK	ALG	Mokhtar Ferrahi
3	DF	ALG	Mehdi Ferrahi
4	MF	ALG	Tayeb Hamoudi
5	DF	ALG	Youcef Douar
6	DF	ALG	Mustapha Bouchina
8	FW	ALG	Nour El Islam Melikchi
9	FW	ALG	Riad Benayad
10	FW	ALG	Tayeb Meziani
12	DF	ALG	Haithem Loucif
15	MF	ALG	Zakaria Messibah

No.	Pos.	Nation	Player
17	DF	ALG	Anis Bey
21	FW	ALG	Sabri Cheraitia
22	DF	ALG	Tarek Bouabta
23	DF	ALG	Abdelhak Amine Nemeur
24	FW	ALG	Zakaria Naidji
25	DF	ALG	Aimen Bouguerra
26	FW	ALG	Yousri Bouzok
28	FW	ALG	Adem Redjem
30	GK	ALG	Toufik Moussaoui
90	MF	ALG	Adem Zorgane

== Transfers ==
=== In ===
Date	Pos	Player	From club	Transfer fee	Source
30 June 2018	MF	(Algeria) Raouf Benguit	USM Alger	Loan Return	
30 June 2018	DF	(Algeria) Youcef Attal	(Belgium) KV Kortrijk	Loan Return	

=== Out ===
Date	Pos	Player	To club	Transfer fee	Source
25 May 2018	DF	(Algeria) Youcef Attal	(Belgium) KV Kortrijk	Undisclosed	
27 May 2018	DF	(Algeria) Islam Arous	MC Alger	Undisclosed	
4 June 2018	DF	(Algeria) islam Chahrour	CS Constantine	Free transfer	
23 June 2018	DF	(Algeria) Raouf Benguit	USM Alger	Loan one year	
25 June 2018	MF	(Algeria) Mehdi Droueche	CA Bordj Bou Arreridj	Free transfer	
2 August 2018	FW	(Algeria) Farid El Mellali	(France) Angers SCO	Undisclosed	
