= 2017–18 Paradou AC season =

Paradou AC
2017–18 season
- Chairman: Hassen Zetchi
- Head coach: Josep María Nogués
- Stadium: Stade Omar Hamadi
- Ligue 1: 7th
- Algerian Cup: Round of 32
- Top goalscorer: League: Zakaria Naidji (11); All: Zakaria Naidji (12)

In the 2017–18 season, Paradou AC competed in the Ligue 1 for the 3rd season, as well as the Algerian Cup.

== Non-competitive ==
=== Overview ===
Competition	Record								Started round	Final position / round	First match	Last match
Competition	G	W	D	L	GF	GA	GD	Win %	Started round	Final position / round	First match	Last match
Ligue 1	30	12	6	12	35	30	+5	40.00	—N/a	7th	26 August 2017	18 May 2018
Algerian Cup	2	1	1	0	4	1	+3	50.00	Round of 64	Round of 32	29 December 2017	12 January 2018
Total	32	13	7	12	39	31	+8	40.63				

Updated to match played 19 May 2017
Source: Competitions

== League table ==
Pos	Team	Pld	W	D	L	GF	GA	GD	Pts	Qualification or relegation
5	MC Alger	30	12	8	10	41	32	+9	44	Qualification for 2018–19 Arab Club Champions Cup
6	USM Alger	30	11	9	10	43	35	+8	42 (Note: Ranked on head-to-head results.)	Qualification for 2018–19 Arab Club Champions Cup
7	Paradou AC	30	12	6	12	35	30	+5	42	
8	ES Sétif	30	10	10	10	35	30	+5	40	Qualification for 2018–19 Arab Club Champions Cup
9	DRB Tadjenanet	30	10	7	13	33	41	−8	37 (Note: Ranked on head-to-head results.)	

Updated to match(es) played on 19 May 2018. Source: DZFoot
Rules for classification: 1) points; 2) head-to-head points; 3) head-to-head goal difference; 4) goal difference; 5) total goals; 6) fairplay ranking; 7) playoff.

=== Results summary ===
Overall								Home						Away					
Pld	W	D	L	GF	GA	GD	Pts	W	D	L	GF	GA	GD	W	D	L	GF	GA	GD
30	12	6	12	35	30	+5	42	9	3	3	24	12	+12	3	3	9	11	18	−7

Last updated: 30 January 2016.
Source: Competitive matches

=== Results by round ===
Round	1	2	3	4	5	6	7	8	9	10	11	12	13	14	15	16	17	18	19	20	21	22	23	24	25	26	27	28	29	30
Ground	A	H	A	H	A	H	A	H	A	H	A	H	A	H	A	H	A	H	A	H	A	H	A	H	A	H	A	H	A	H
Result	L	W	D	W	L	D	W	W	L	L	W	L	D	L	W	D	L	W	W	W	D	W	L	L	L	L	W	L	W	D
Position	12	10	9	6	9	9	8	5	6	8	6	8	8	9	8	9	8	8	6	5	5	5	7	8	8	8	8	8	7	7

Source: Competitive matches
A = Away; H = Home; W = Win; D = Draw; L = Loss

=== Matches ===
Win Draw Loss

26 August 2017 Round 1	USM Alger	2–1	Paradou AC	Bologhine
19:00	Hamzaoui 46'; Meftah 80' (pen.)	Soccerway report Live TV: None	28' Naidji	Stadium: Omar Hamadi Stadium; Referee: Mustapha Ghorbal; Man of the Match: Meftah

7 September 2017 Round 2	Paradou AC	1–0	MC Oran	Bologhine
18:00	Bouabta 13'	Soccerway report Live TV: TV Tamazight 4		Stadium: Omar Hamadi Stadium; Referee: Said Aouina

15 September 2017 Round 3	JS Kabylie	1–1	Paradou AC	Tizi Ouzou
17:00	Boukhenchouche 10'	Soccerway report Live TV: None	39' Bouchina	Stadium: November 1, 1954 Stadium; Attendance: 0 (close doors); Referee: Mohamed Saïdi

22 September 2017 Round 4	Paradou AC	1–0	USM Blida	Bologhine
17:00	El Melali 4'	Soccerway report Live TV: Algérie 3		Stadium: Omar Hamadi Stadium; Referee: Merzoug Brahimi

29 September 2017 Round 5	JS Saoura	2–0	Paradou AC	Béchar
19:00	Djallit 30'; Yahia-Chérif 55'	Soccerway report Live TV: None		Stadium: Stade 20 Août 1955; Referee: Missoum Benabdellah

12 October 2017 Round 6	NA Hussein Dey	1–1	Paradou AC	Mohamed Belouizdad
16:00	Addadi 23' (pen.)	Soccerway report Live TV: Canal Algérie	11' Ben Khelifa	Stadium: August 20, 1955 Stadium; Referee: Merzak Halalchi

16 October 2017 Round 7	Paradou AC	1–0	DRB Tadjenanet	Bologhine
17:00	Naidji 60'	Soccerway report Live TV: TV Tamazight 4		Stadium: Omar Hamadi Stadium; Referee: Mohamed Saïdi

21 October 2017 Round 8	USM Bel-Abbès	0–1	Paradou AC	Sidi Bel Abbès
17:00		Soccerway report Live TV: Canal Algérie	53' Ben Khelifa	Stadium: Stade 24 Fevrier 1956; Referee: Rafik Achouri

27 October 2017 Round 9	Paradou AC	2–3	USM El Harrach	Bologhine
16:00	Bouchina 7'; Naidji 31'	Soccerway report Live TV: EPTV Terrestre	4' Benrokia; 45+1' (pen.), 61' Mellel	Stadium: Omar Hamadi Stadium; Referee: Mustapha Bessiri

3 November 2017 Round 10	MC Alger	2–1	Paradou AC	Bologhine
16:00	Balegh 23'; Derrardja 53'	Soccerway report Live TV: Algérie 3 / TV Tamazight 4	78' Cheraitia	Stadium: Omar Hamadi Stadium; Referee: Mustapha Ghorbal

9 November 2017 Round 11	Paradou AC	1–0	US Biskra	Bologhine
17:00	Benyoucef 46'	Soccerway report Live TV: TV Tamazight 4		Stadium: Omar Hamadi Stadium; Referee: Merzoug Brahimi

18 November 2017 Round 12	ES Sétif	2–1	Paradou AC	Sétif
17:00	Amokrane 45+3'; Benayad 75'	Soccerway report Live TV: Algérie 3	64' Benayad	Stadium: Stade 8 Mai 1945; Referee: Abderrezzak Arab

2 December 2017 Round 13	Paradou AC	0–0	CR Belouizdad	Bologhine
17:00		Soccerway report Live TV: None		Stadium: Omar Hamadi Stadium; Referee: Ahmed Bouzrar

8 December 2017 Round 14	Olympique de Médéa	1–0	Paradou AC	Médéa
15:00	Bouabdallah 71'	Soccerway report Live TV: None		Stadium: Stade Imam Lyes de Médéa; Referee: Mustapha Ghorbal

16 December 2017 Round 15	Paradou AC	2–0	CS Constantine	Bologhine
17:00	Cheraitia 3'; Naidji 83'	Soccerway report Live TV: Canal Algérie		Stadium: Omar Hamadi Stadium; Referee: Mohamed Saïdi

6 January 2018 Round 16	Paradou AC	0–0	USM Alger	Bologhine
17:00		Soccerway report Live TV: TV Tamazight 4		Stadium: Omar Hamadi Stadium; Referee: Lotfi Bekouassa

20 January 2018 Round 17	MC Oran	1–0	Paradou AC	Oran
16:00	Toumi 80'	Soccerway report Live TV: Algérie 3		Stadium: Ahmed Zabana Stadium; Referee: Merzoug Brahimi

26 January 2018 Round 18	Paradou AC	2–0	JS Kabylie	Bologhine
16:00	Naidji 40' (pen.), 50'	Soccerway report Live TV: TV Tamazight 4		Stadium: Omar Hamadi Stadium; Referee: Said Aouina

9 February 2018 Round 19	USM Blida	0–1	Paradou AC	Blida
15:00		Soccerway report Live TV: None	51' Bouzok	Stadium: Brakni Brothers Stadium; Attendance: 0 (close doors); Referee: Ahmed Bouzrar

17 February 2018 Round 20	Paradou AC	3–0	JS Saoura	Bologhine
16:00	Naidji 47'; El Mellali 83', 86'	Soccerway report Live TV: Algérie 3		Stadium: Omar Hamadi Stadium; Referee: Mustapha Ghorbal

23 February 2018 Round 21	Paradou AC	1–1	NA Hussein Dey	Bologhine
16:00	Naidji 60'	Soccerway report Live TV: None	76' (pen.) Alati	Stadium: Omar Hamadi Stadium; Referee: Redouane Necib

10 March 2018 Round 22	DRB Tadjenanet	1–2	Paradou AC	Tadjenanet
16:00	Aïb 90+5'	Soccerway report Live TV: None	33' El Mellali; 88' Naidji	Stadium: Lahoua Smaïl Stadium; Referee: Farouk Mial

15 March 2018 Round 23	Paradou AC	0–1	USM Bel-Abbès	Bologhine
17:00		Soccerway report Live TV: None	35' Abdelli	Stadium: Omar Hamadi Stadium; Referee: Merzoug Brahimi

31 March 2018 Round 24	USM El Harrach	2–1	Paradou AC	Algiers
16:00	Bouguèche 60' (pen.); Fekih 86'	Soccerway report Live TV: None	42' Naidji	Stadium: Stade 1er Novembre 1954; Referee: Said Aouina

7 April 2018 Round 25	Paradou AC	1–5	MC Alger	Bologhine
15:00	Naidji 24' (pen.)	Soccerway report Live TV: None	7' Souibaâh; 14', 38' Derrardja; 71' Bendebka; 90+2' Balegh	Stadium: Omar Hamadi Stadium; Referee: Ahmed Bouzrar

20 April 2018 Round 26	US Biskra	1–0	Paradou AC	Biskra
16:00	Boufligha 80'	Soccerway report Live TV: None		Stadium: El Alia Sports Complex; Referee: Redouane Necib

24 April 2018 Round 27	Paradou AC	4–2	ES Sétif	Bologhine
16:00	Bouzok 25', 62'; Benayad 64'; Loucif 65'	Soccerway report Live TV: None	11' Aiboud; 76' Obambou	Stadium: Omar Hamadi Stadium; Referee: Mustapha Bessiri

4 May 2018 Round 28	CR Belouizdad	2–1	Paradou AC	Belouizdad
16:00	Lakroum 12'; Bourenane 79' (pen.)	Soccerway report Live TV: Canal Algérie	81' Yahi	Stadium: Stade 20 Août 1955; Referee: Ramdane Oukil

12 May 2018 Round 29	Paradou AC	5–0	Olympique de Médéa	Bologhine
16:00	Benayad 19' (pen.), 23'; Messibah 58'; Bouzok 68'; Loucif 72'	Soccerway report Live TV: None		Stadium: Omar Hamadi Stadium; Referee: Mustapha Ghorbal

18 May 2018 Round 30	CS Constantine	0–0	Paradou AC	Constantine
22:30		Soccerway report Live TV: Al-Kass Sports		Stadium: Stade Mohamed Hamlaoui; Referee: Boubekeur Zouaoui

== Algerian Cup ==
29 December 2017 Round of 64	MC El Eulma	0–3	Paradou AC	El Eulma
14:30			17' Benayad; 57' Naïdji; 76' Bouzouk	Stadium: Stade Messaoud Zougar; Referee: Nabil Boukhalfa

12 January 2018 Round of 32	MC El Bayadh	1–1 (a.e.t.) (4–2 p)	Paradou AC	El Bayadh
14:45	Touar 120'		Benayad 112'	Stadium: Madjdoub Zakaria Stadium
	Penalties
	? (penalty scored); Bousmaha (penalty scored); Amine Antar (penalty scored) (penalty scored)		(penalty missed); (penalty scored) Bouchina; (penalty scored) Benayad (penalty missed)

== Squad information ==
=== Playing statistics ===
No.	Pos	Nat	Player	Total		Ligue 1		Algerian Cup	
No.	Pos	Nat	Player	Apps	Goals	Apps	Goals	Apps	Goals
Goalkeepers
16	GK	(Algeria) ALG	Mohamed El amine Negab	0	0	0	0	0	0
30	GK	(Algeria) ALG	Toufik Moussaoui	30	0	30	0	0	0
Defenders
5	DF	(Algeria) ALG	Youcef Douar	2	0	2	0	0	0
6	DF	(Algeria) ALG	Mustapha Bouchina	19	2	19	2	0	0
13	DF	(Algeria) ALG	Juba Cherani	1	0	1	0	0	0
19	DF	(Algeria) ALG	Islam Chahrour	24	0	24	0	0	0
20	DF	(Algeria) ALG	Islam Arous	25	0	25	0	0	0
21	DF	(Algeria) ALG	Sabri Cheraitia	19	2	19	2	0	0
22	DF	(Algeria) ALG	Tarek Bouabta	24	1	24	1	0	0
25	DF	(Algeria) ALG	Aimen Bouguerra	8	0	8	0	0	0
49	DF	(Algeria) ALG	Hamza Mouali	24	0	24	0	0	0
	DF	(Algeria) ALG	Haithem Loucif	8	2	8	2	0	0
Midfielders
15	MF	(Algeria) ALG	Zakaria Messibah	30	2	30	2	0	0
17	MF	(Algeria) ALG	Taher Benkhelifa	26	2	26	2	0	0
18	MF	(Algeria) ALG	Abdelmehdi Droueche	14	0	14	0	0	0
34	MF	(Algeria) ALG	Hicham Boudaoui	7	0	7	0	0	0
34	MF	(Algeria) ALG	Nour El Islam Melikchi	15	0	15	0	0	0
	MF	(Algeria) ALG	Ishak Salah Eddine Harrari	3	0	3	0	0	0
	MF	(Mali) MLI	Mohamed Sangare	6	0	6	0	0	0
Forwards
9	FW	(Algeria) ALG	Riad Benayad	18	4	18	4	0	0
26	MF	(Algeria) ALG	Yousri Bouzok	22	4	22	4	0	0
24	FW	(Algeria) ALG	Zakaria Naidji	23	11	23	11	0	0
41	FW	(Algeria) ALG	Farid El Mellali	23	4	23	4	0	0
	FW	(Algeria) ALG	Abdelkader Ghorab	1	0	1	0	0	0
	FW	(Algeria) ALG	Ghiles Guenaoui	8	0	8	0	0	0
	FW	(Algeria) ALG	Yazid Yahi	1	1	1	1	0	0
Players transferred out during the season
	MF	(Algeria) ALG	Ahmed Gagaâ	9	0	9	0	0	0
	MF	(Algeria) ALG	Lyes Benyoucef	12	0	12	0	0	0

Last updated: 25 May 2018
Source: fr.soccerway.com

=== Goalscorers ===
Includes all competitive matches. The list is sorted alphabetically by surname when total goals are equal.

No.	Nat.	Player	Pos.	L 1	AC	TOTAL
24	(Algeria)	Zakaria Naidji	FW	11	1	12
9	(Algeria)	Riad Benayad	FW	4	2	6
26	(Algeria)	Yousri Bouzok	MF	4	1	5
41	(Algeria)	Farid El Mellali	FW	4	0	4
6	(Algeria)	Mustapha Bouchina	DF	2	0	2
21	(Algeria)	Sabri Cheraitia	DF	2	0	2
17	(Algeria)	Taher Benkhelifa	MF	2	0	2
	(Algeria)	Haithem Loucif	MF	2	0	2
15	(Algeria)	Zakaria Messibah	MF	2	0	2
22	(Algeria)	Tarek Bouabta	DF	1	0	1
	(Algeria)	Yazid Yahi	FW	1	0	1
Own Goals				0	0	0
Totals				35	4	39

== Squad list ==
As of August 25, 2017. Note: Flags indicate national team as defined under FIFA eligibility rules; some limited exceptions apply. Players may hold more than one non-FIFA nationality.

No.	Pos.	Nation	Player
1	GK	ALG	Mokhtar Ferrahi
6	DF	ALG	Mustapha Bouchina
7	MF	ALG	Yassine Benouadah
9	FW	ALG	Riad Benayad
10	MF	ALG	Lyes Benyoucef
15	MF	ALG	Zakaria Messibah
16	GK	ALG	Mohamed El amine Negab
17	MF	ALG	Taher Benkhelifa
18	FW	ALG	Abdelmehdi Droueche
19	DF	ALG	islam Chahrour
20	DF	ALG	Islam Arous
21	FW	ALG	Sabri Cheraitia

No.	Pos.	Nation	Player
22	DF	ALG	Tarek Bouabta
24	FW	ALG	Zakaria Naidji
26	FW	ALG	Yousri Bouzok
27	FW	ALG	Abdellah Djelloul Daouadji
29	MF	ALG	Ahmed Gagaâ
30	GK	ALG	Toufik Moussaoui
34	MF	ALG	Nour El Islam Melikchi
41	MF	ALG	Farid El Mellali
49	DF	ALG	Hamza Mouali
-	DF	ALG	Haithem Loucif
-	MF	MLI	Mohamed Sangare (on loan from AS Real Bamako)

== Transfers ==
=== In ===
Date	Pos	Player	From club	Transfer fee	Source
31 July 2017	GK	(Algeria) Mohamed Nageb	NRBR Reghaia	Free transfer	
31 July 2017	MF	(Mali) Mohamed Sangaré	(Mali) Acamédie JMG	Loan one year	
19 December 2017	FW	(Algeria) Zakaria Mansouri	MC Alger	Return before the end of the loan	

=== Out ===
Date	Pos	Player	To club	Transfer fee	Source
19 July 2017	RB	(Algeria) Youcef Attal	(Belgium) KV Kortrijk	Loan one year	
22 July 2017	FW	(Algeria) Zakaria Mansouri	MC Alger	Loan one year	
22 July 2017	MF	(Algeria) Abdellah El Mouden	MC Alger	Loan one year + 1,300,000 DA	
5 August 2017	FW	(Algeria) Tayeb Meziani	(France) Le Havre AC	Loan one year	
27 December 2017	MF	(Algeria) Lyes Benyoucef	JS Kabylie	Loan for 18 months	
7 January 2018	MF	(Algeria) Ahmed Gagaâ	CS Constantine	Loan for 18 months	
8 January 2018	FW	(Algeria) Abdellah Djelloul Daouadji	DRB Tadjenanet	Loan	
9 January 2018	FW	(Algeria) Zakaria Mansouri	MC Oran	Undisclosed	
