= 2019–20 Paradou AC season =

Paradou AC
2019–20 season
- Chairman: Hassen Zetchi
- Head coach: Francisco Chaló
- Stadium: Stade Omar Hamadi
- Ligue 1: 10th
- Algerian Cup: Cancelled
- Confederation Cup: Group stage
- Top goalscorer: League: Yousri Bouzok (7 goals); All: Yousri Bouzok (12 goals)
Home colours	Away colours

In the 2019–20 season, Paradou AC competed in Ligue 1 for the 5th season, as well as for the CAF Confederation Cup and the Algerian Cup. On March 15, 2020, the Ligue de Football Professionnel (LFP) decided to halt the season due to the COVID-19 pandemic in Algeria. On July 29, 2020, the LFP declared that season is over and CR Belouizdad to be the champion, the promotion of four teams from the League 2, and scraping the relegation for the current season.

== Pre-season ==
17 July 2019 Friendly	Paksi (Hungary)	2–1	(Algeria) Paradou AC	Limbuš, Slovenia
17:00	Hahn 55'; Könyves 83'	Report	Mouali 33'	Stadium: Pod Grajskim gričem

22 July 2019 Friendly	Paradou AC (Algeria)	3–1	(Saudi Arabia) Al-Ettifaq	TBC, Slovenia
17:00	Bouguerra; Ghorab; Bouzok	Report		Stadium: TBC

23 July 2019 Friendly	Paradou AC (Algeria)	3–2	(Hungary) Zalaegerszegi	Slovenske Konjice, Slovenia
14:00		Report		Stadium: Štadion Dobrava

25 July 2019 Friendly	Al-Wehda (Saudi Arabia)	3–0	(Algeria) Paradou AC	Maribor, Slovenia
18:00 CEST	Çolak; Goodwin			Stadium: Stadium of Limbus

26 July 2019 Friendly	Al-Hazem (Saudi Arabia)	0–3	(Algeria) Paradou AC	Bakovci, Slovenia
17:00 CEST		Report	Bouchina 14'; Herrari 35'; Elardja 60'	Stadium: SRC Bakovci Stadium

== Competitions ==
=== Overview ===
Competition	Record								Started round	Final position / round	First match	Last match
Competition	G	W	D	L	GF	GA	GD	Win %	Started round	Final position / round	First match	Last match
Ligue 1	20	7	5	8	20	18	+2	35.00	—N/a	10th	15 August 2019	7 March 2020
Algerian Cup	4	3	1	0	14	1	+13	75.00	Round of 64	Cancelled	26 December 2019	11 March 2020
Confederation Cup	12	5	4	3	15	9	+6	41.67	First round	Group stage	9 August 2019	2 February 2020
Total	36	15	10	11	49	28	+21	41.67				

Updated to match played 3 June 2019
Source: Competitions

== League table ==
Pos	Team	Pld	W	D	L	GF	GA	GD	Pts	PPG
8	AS Aïn M'lila	22	8	8	6	26	25	+1	32	1.45
9	MC Oran	22	7	9	6	28	24	+4	30	1.36
10	Paradou AC	20	7	5	8	20	18	+2	26	1.30
11	USM Bel Abbès	21	8	2	11	22	31	−9	26	1.24
12	ASO Chlef	21	6	7	8	15	17	−2	25	1.19

Updated to match(es) played on 15 March 2020. Source: dzfoot.com
Rules for classification: 1) points; 2) head-to-head points; 3) head-to-head goal difference; 4) goal difference; 5) total goals; 6) fairplay ranking; 7) playoff.

=== Results summary ===
Overall								Home						Away					
Pld	W	D	L	GF	GA	GD	Pts	W	D	L	GF	GA	GD	W	D	L	GF	GA	GD
20	7	5	8	20	18	+2	26	4	3	4	14	11	+3	3	2	4	6	7	−1

Last updated: 22 April 2018.
Source: Competitive matches

=== Results by round ===
Round	1	2	3	4	5	6	7	8	9	10	11	12	13	14	15	16	17	18	19	20	21	22	23	24	25	26	27	28	29	30
Ground	A	H	H	A	H	A	H	A	H	A	H	A	H	A	H	H	A	A	H	A	H	A	H	A	H	A	H	A	H	A
Result	L	L	L	L	W	L	D	W	W	L	D	D	L	W	W	W	C	D	L	W	D	C	C	C	C	C	C	C	C	C
Position	13	15	16	16	16	16	16	16	9	12	15	13	15	14	12	10	12	12	12	11	10	10	10	10	10	10	10	10	10	10

Updated to match(es) played on 22 April 2020. Source: Competitive matches
A = Away; H = Home; W = Win; D = Draw; L = Loss

=== Matches ===
Win Draw Loss

15 August 2019 Round 1	US Biskra	1–0	Paradou AC	Biskra
21:00	Messadia 11'	Soccerway report		Stadium: Stade du 18 Février; Referee: Ahmed Bouzrar

19 August 2019 Round 2	Paradou AC	1–2	MC Alger	Bologhine
20:30	Guenaoui 19'	Soccerway report	Frioui 52'; Chafaï 65'	Stadium: Omar Hamadi Stadium; Referee: Mehdi Abid Charef

31 August 2019 Round 3	Paradou AC	0–3	JS Kabylie	Bologhine
20:30		Soccerway report	Banouh 37'; Benchaira 55'; Bounoua 64'	Stadium: Omar Hamadi Stadium; Referee: Abderrezzak Arab

24 September 2019 Round 5	Paradou AC	1–0	ASO Chlef	Bologhine
17:00	Zorgane 32'	Soccerway report		Stadium: Omar Hamadi Stadium; Referee: Mustapha Bessiri

6 October 2019 Round 7	Paradou AC	0–0	CR Belouizdad	Algiers
17:45		Soccerway report		Stadium: July 5, 1962 Stadium; Referee: Mohamed Saïdi

12 October 2019 Round 4	JS Saoura	1–0	Paradou AC	Béchar
19:00	Saâd 87'	Soccerway report		Stadium: Stade 20 Août 1955; Referee: Mustapha Ghorbal

23 October 2019 Round 8	MC Oran	0–1	Paradou AC	Oran
18:00		Soccerway report	Ghorab 80'	Stadium: Ahmed Zabana Stadium; Referee: Redouane Necib

9 November 2019 Round 10	CA Bordj Bou Arreridj	2–0	Paradou AC	Bordj Bou Arréridj
18:00	Diomande 36'; Arroussi 47'	Soccerway report		Stadium: August 20, 1955 Stadium; Referee: Abderrezzak Arab

23 November 2019 Round 11	Paradou AC	1–1	ES Sétif	Bologhine
18:45	Messiad 84'	Soccerway report	Radouani 14' (pen.)	Stadium: Omar Hamadi Stadium; Referee: Mustapha Bessiri

16 December 2019 Round 14	NA Hussein Dey	1–3	Paradou AC	Belouizdad
15:00	Mouaki Dadi 37'	Soccerway report	Bouzok 20' (pen.); Zorgane 52' (pen.); Kadri 62'	Stadium: Stade 20 Août 1955; Referee: Farouk Mial

21 December 2019 Round 15	Paradou AC	4–1	AS Aïn M'lila	Bologhine
16:00	Mouali 10'; Redjem 24'; Bouzok 48', 57'	Soccerway report	Tiaiba 69'	Stadium: Omar Hamadi Stadium; Referee: Bilal Bendjahene

2 January 2020 Round 6	USM Alger	1–0	Paradou AC	Bologhine
18:45	Boumechra 26'	Soccerway report		Stadium: Omar Hamadi Stadium; Referee: Missoum Benabdellah

8 January 2020 Round 9	Paradou AC	3–0	USM Bel Abbès	Bologhine
17:00	Zorgane 13'; Guenaoui 35', 53'	Soccerway report		Stadium: Omar Hamadi Stadium; Referee: Farouk Mial

19 January 2020 Round 12	NC Magra	1–1	Paradou AC	Ras El Oued
14:30	Abdelhafid 65'	Soccerway report	Bouzok 26'	Stadium: Stade Martyr Al Taher Qidum; Referee: Mustapha Bessiri

23 January 2020 Round 13	Paradou AC	1–2	CS Constantine	Bologhine
17:00	Bouzok 27' (pen.)	Soccerway report	Abid 65'; Amokrane 90+4'	Stadium: Omar Hamadi Stadium; Referee: Mohamed Bouteraa

6 February 2020 Round 16	Paradou AC	2–0	US Biskra	Bologhine
17:00	Bouzok 54' (pen.), 70'	Soccerway report		Stadium: Omar Hamadi Stadium; Referee: Bilal Bendjahene

17 February 2020 Round 18	JS Kabylie	0–0	Paradou AC	Tizi Ouzou
17:00		Soccerway report		Stadium: Stade 1er Novembre 1954; Referee: Mustapha Ghorbal

22 February 2020 Round 19	Paradou AC	0–1	JS Saoura	Bologhine
16:00		Soccerway report	Yahia-Chérif 20'	Stadium: Omar Hamadi Stadium; Referee: Redouane Necib

27 February 2020 Round 20	ASO Chlef	0–1	Paradou AC	Chlef
17:00		Soccerway report	Kadri 63'	Stadium: Stade Mohamed Boumezrag; Referee: Farouk Mial

7 March 2020 Round 21	Paradou AC	1–1	USM Alger	Algiers
16:00	Bouzok 90+5'	Soccerway report	Zouari 82'	Stadium: Stade du 5 Juillet; Referee: Mohamed Saïdi

16 March 2020 Round 22	CR Belouizdad	Cancelled	Paradou AC	Belouizdad
15:00		Soccerway report		Stadium: Stade 20 Août 1955; Attendance: 0 (close doors); Referee: Mohamed Boutaraa
Note: Match was postponed due to coronavirus pandemic.

Round 17	MC Alger	Cancelled	Paradou AC	Algiers
				Stadium: July 5, 1962 Stadium

Round 23	Paradou AC	Cancelled	MC Oran	Bologhine
				Stadium: Omar Hamadi Stadium

Round 24	USM Bel Abbès	Cancelled	Paradou AC	Sidi Bel Abbès
				Stadium: Stade 24 Fevrier 1956

Round 25	Paradou AC	Cancelled	CA Bordj Bou Arreridj	Bologhine
				Stadium: Omar Hamadi Stadium

Round 26	ES Sétif	Cancelled	Paradou AC	Sétif
				Stadium: Stade 8 Mai 1945

Round 27	Paradou AC	Cancelled	NC Magra	Bologhine
				Stadium: Omar Hamadi Stadium

Round 28	CS Constantine	Cancelled	Paradou AC	Constantine
				Stadium: Stade Mohamed Hamlaoui

Round 29	Paradou AC	Cancelled	NA Hussein Dey	Bologhine
				Stadium: Omar Hamadi Stadium

Round 30	AS Aïn M'lila	Cancelled	Paradou AC	Aïn M'lila
				Stadium: Touhami Zoubir Khelifi Stadium

== Algerian Cup ==
26 December 2019 Round of 64	Paradou AC	5–0	FC Bir el Arch	Bologhine
14:00	Messiad 28'; Mouali 56'; Kismoun 73' (pen.), 81'; Zerrouki 82'	Report		Stadium: Omar Hamadi Stadium; Referee: Allou, Moukrane, Reeh
Note: Lineup for Paradou AC - Ferrahi, Bouchina, Haïmoud, Douar, Mouali (Chirani 60’), Hamoudi (Kibboua 72’), Messiad, Kadri, Guenaoui (Zerrouki 60’), Kismoun, Berkoune

13 February 2020 Round of 32	Paradou AC	5–0	MC El Bayadh	Bologhine
15:00	Bouzok 15'; Bouabta 55'; Kadri 57'; Messiad 84'; Okello 87'	Report		Stadium: Omar Hamadi Stadium; Referee: Bahloul
Note: Lineup for Paradou AC - Moussaoui, Bouzok, Chirani, Bouabta, Bouchina, Hamoudi (Berkoune 60’), Kadri (Kismoun 78’), Redjem (Okello 66’), Messiad, Guenaoui, Harrari

3 March 2020 Round of 16	ES Guelma	0–0 (a.e.t.) (3–4 p)	Paradou AC	Guelma
14:00		Report		Stadium: Stade Souidani Boujemaa; Referee: Ali Nader
Note: Lineup for Paradou AC - Ferrahi, Bouzok, Mouali, Douar, Bouabta, Elardja (Okello 66’), Zorgane, Berkoun (Tahri 77’), Redjem, Kismoun (Kadri 46’), Ghorab.

11 March 2020 QF 1st leg	Paradou AC	4–1	ASM Oran	Dar El Beïda
15:00	Kadri 5'; Mouali 16'; Messiad 65'; Kismoun 90+3'	Soccerway report	Benrokia 9'	Stadium: Omar Benrabah Stadium; Attendance: 0 (close doors); Referee: Said Aouina
Note: due to coronavirus outbreak, Ministry of Health, Population and Hospital Reform decided to be all matches played behind closed doors.

QF 2nd leg	ASM Oran	Cancelled	Paradou AC	Oran
				Stadium: Habib Bouakeul Stadium

== Confederation Cup ==
=== Preliminary round ===
9 August 2019 First leg	Paradou AC (Algeria)	3–0	(Guinea) CI Kamsar	Algiers
20:45 UTC+1	Ghorab 20'; Bouzok 53'; Benayad 90+1'	Report		Stadium: July 5, 1962 Stadium; Referee: Abdulwahid Huraywidah (Libya)
Note: Lineup for Paradou AC - Moussaoui - Hamoudi, Douar, Bouchina, Zorgane, Guenaoui (Benayad 79’), Tahri, Mouali, Bouguerra, Bouzok (Kadri 72’), Ghorab.

24 August 2019 Second leg	CI Kamsar (Guinea)	1–0	(Algeria) Paradou AC	Conakry
15:00 UTC+0	Sosah 82'	Report		Stadium: Stade du 28 Septembre; Referee: Dawdu Williams (Sierra Leone)
Note: Lineup for Paradou AC - Moussaoui - Bouguerra, Mouali, Bouabta, Douar, Bouchina (Elardja 90’), Hamoudi, Tahri, Bouzok (Kadri 81’), Zorgane, Ghorab (Benayad 66’).

=== First round ===
15 September 2019 First leg	Paradou AC (Algeria)	3–1	(Tunisia) CS Sfaxien	Algiers
20:45 UTC+1	Mouali 13'; Ghorab 61'; Bouzok 71' (pen.)	Report	Marzouki 2'	Stadium: July 5, 1962 Stadium; Referee: Fabricio Duarte (Cape Verde)
Note: Lineup for Paradou AC - Moussaoui - Bouguerra, Bouchina, Bouabta, Mouali - Hamoudi (Redjem 15’), Kadri, Zorgane - Bouzok, Benayad (Zerrouki 77’), Ghorab (Messibah 86’).

29 September 2019 Second leg	CS Sfaxien (Tunisia)	0–0	(Algeria) Paradou AC	Sfax
18:00 UTC+1		Report		Stadium: Stade Taïeb Mhiri; Referee: Adil Zourak (Morocco)
Note: Lineup for Paradou AC - Moussaoui - Bouguerra, Bouchina, Bouabta, Mouali - Hamoudi, Kadri, Zorgane, Tahri - Bouzok, Ghorab (Guenaoui 49’).

=== Play-off round ===
27 October 2019 First leg	KCCA (Uganda)	0–0	(Algeria) Paradou AC	Kampala
16:00 UTC+3		Report		Stadium: Startimes Stadium; Referee: Thulani Sibandze (Eswatini)
Note: Lineup for Paradou AC - Moussaoui - Mouali, Douar, Bouchina, Bouabta, Redjem, Zorgane, Kadri (Kibboua ?’), Bouzok (Zerrouki ?’), Guenaoui (Harrari ?’), ?.

3 November 2019 Second leg	Paradou AC (Algeria)	4–1	(Uganda) KCCA	Algiers
20:45 UTC+1	Herrari 9'; Bouzok 38' (pen.); Kadri 65'; Bouguerra 70'	Report	Okello 23'	Stadium: Stade du 5 Juillet; Referee: Louis Houngnandande (Benin)
Note: Lineup for Paradou AC - Moussaoui - Bouabta, Douar, Mouali (Elardja 83’), Bouguerra - Harrari (Guenaoui 65’), Zorgane, Kadri (Kibboua 76’) - Ghorab, Bouzok, Redjem.

=== Group stage ===
==== Group D ====
Pos	Team	Pld	W	D	L	GF	GA	GD	Pts	Qualification	HAS	ENY	PAC	SNP
1	(Morocco) Hassania Agadir	6	3	2	1	9	5	+4	11	Advance to knockout stage	—	2–0	0–3	3–0
2	(Nigeria) Enyimba	6	3	1	2	11	7	+4	10	Advance to knockout stage	1–1	—	4–1	1–0
3	(Algeria) Paradou AC	6	2	2	2	5	6	−1	8		0–2	1–0	—	0–0
4	(Ivory Coast) FC San Pédro	6	0	3	3	3	10	−7	3		1–1	2–5	0–0	—

Source: CAF

1 December 2019 Matchday 1	FC San Pédro (Ivory Coast)	0–0	(Algeria) Paradou AC	Abidjan (Note: FC San Pédro play their home matches at Stade Félix Houphouët-Boigny, Abidjan, instead of their regular home stadium Stade Auguste Denise, San-Pédro, which did not meet CAF requirements.)
(16:00 UTC+0)		Report (Soccerway)		Stadium: Stade Félix Houphouët-Boigny; Referee: Pacifique Ndabihawenimana (Burundi)

8 December 2019 Matchday 2	Paradou AC (Algeria)	0–2	(Morocco) Hassania Agadir	Blida (Note: Paradou AC play their home matches at Mustapha Tchaker Stadium, Blida, instead of their regular home stadium Stade de Hydra, Hydra, which did not meet CAF requirements.)
(20:00 UTC+1)		Report (Soccerway)	Oubilla 26'; Rami 48'	Stadium: Mustapha Tchaker Stadium; Referee: Jean Ouattara (Burkina Faso)

29 December 2019 Matchday 3	Paradou AC (Algeria)	1–0	(Nigeria) Enyimba	Blida
(20:00 UTC+1)	Ghorab 64'	Report (Soccerway)		Stadium: Mustapha Tchaker Stadium; Referee: Daouda Guèye (Senegal)

12 January 2020 Matchday 4	Enyimba (Nigeria)	4–1	(Algeria) Paradou AC	Aba
(14:00 UTC+1)	Dimgba 15', 36', 76'; Mbaoma 35'	Report	Kadri 89'	Stadium: Enyimba International Stadium; Referee: Al Hadi Mahamat (Chad)

26 January 2020 Matchday 5	Paradou AC (Algeria)	0–0	(Ivory Coast) FC San Pédro	Blida
(20:00 UTC+1)		Report		Stadium: Mustapha Tchaker Stadium; Referee: Mutaz Ibrahim (Libya)

2 February 2020 Matchday 6	Hassania Agadir (Morocco)	0–3	(Algeria) Paradou AC	Agadir
(17:00 UTC+1)		Report	Kismoun 10', 72'; Bouzok 90+5'	Stadium: Stade Adrar; Referee: Abdel Aziz Mohamed Bouh (Mauritania)

== Squad information ==
=== Playing statistics ===
No.	Pos	Nat	Player	Total		Ligue 1		Algerian Cup		Confederation Cup	
No.	Pos	Nat	Player	Apps	Goals	Apps	Goals	Apps	Goals	Apps	Goals
Goalkeepers
1	GK	(Algeria) ALG	Mokhtar Ferrahi	3	0	0	0	3	0	0	0
30	GK	(Algeria) ALG	Toufik Moussaoui	33	0	20	0	1	0	12	0
Defenders
3	DF	(Algeria) ALG	Abderrezak Kibboua	4	0	0	0	1	0	3	0
5	DF	(Algeria) ALG	Youcef Douar	30	0	18	0	3	0	9	0
12	DF	(Algeria) ALG	Kheir Eddine Ali Haïmoud	5	0	3	0	1	0	1	0
13	DF	(Algeria) ALG	Juba Chirani	5	0	2	0	2	0	1	0
17	DF	(Algeria) ALG	Anis Bey	0	0	0	0	0	0	0	0
20	DF	(Algeria) ALG	Hamza Mouali	33	4	19	1	3	2	11	1
21	DF	(Algeria) ALG	Islam Arous	1	0	1	0	0	0	0	0
22	DF	(Algeria) ALG	Tarek Bouabta	29	1	15	0	3	1	11	0
23	DF	(Algeria) ALG	Abdelhak Amine Nemeur	0	0	0	0	0	0	0	0
25	DF	(Algeria) ALG	Aimen Bouguerra	20	1	11	0	1	0	8	1
Midfielders
4	MF	(Algeria) ALG	Tayeb Hamoudi	28	0	16	0	2	0	10	0
6	DF	(Algeria) ALG	Mustapha Bouchina	29	1	17	1	3	0	9	0
10	MF	(Algeria) ALG	Adem Zorgane	31	3	19	3	2	0	10	0
14	MF	(Algeria) ALG	Ishak Salah Eddine Harrari	9	1	6	0	1	0	2	1
15	MF	(Algeria) ALG	Zakaria Messibah	1	0	0	0	0	0	1	0
18	MF	(Algeria) ALG	Abdeldjalil Tahri	9	0	4	0	1	0	4	0
19	MF	(Algeria) ALG	Mohamed Fenniri	0	0	0	0	0	0	0	0
27	MF	(Algeria) ALG	Abdelkahar Kadri	31	6	17	2	4	2	10	2
	MF	(Algeria) ALG	Hicham Messiad	16	4	11	1	3	3	2	0
	MF	(Algeria) ALG	Abderrahmane Berkoune	13	0	8	0	3	0	2	0
Forwards
2	FW	(Algeria) ALG	Abdelhak Elardja	7	0	1	0	1	0	5	0
7	FW	(Algeria) ALG	Sid Ali Mebarki	2	0	1	0	0	0	1	0
8	FW	(Kenya) KEN	Allan Okello	3	1	1	0	2	1	0	0
9	FW	(Algeria) ALG	Riad Benayad	7	1	4	0	0	0	3	1
11	FW	(Algeria) ALG	Ghiles Guenaoui	28	2	15	2	3	0	10	0
21	FW	(Algeria) ALG	Oussama Kismoun	10	5	4	0	4	3	2	2
23	FW	(Algeria) ALG	Zerroug Boucif	10	0	6	0	0	0	4	0
26	FW	(Algeria) ALG	Yousri Bouzok	32	12	18	7	3	1	11	4
28	FW	(Algeria) ALG	Adem Redjem	29	1	18	1	3	0	8	0
29	FW	(Algeria) ALG	Abdelkader Ghorab	28	5	18	2	1	0	9	3
99	FW	(Algeria) ALG	Merouane Zerrouki	10	1	3	0	2	1	5	0
Players transferred out during the season

Last updated: 5 July 2018
Source: fr.soccerway.com

=== Goalscorers ===
Includes all competitive matches. The list is sorted alphabetically by surname when total goals are equal.

No.	Nat.	Player	Pos.	L 1	AC	CC 3	TOTAL
26	(Algeria)	Yousri Bouzok	FW	7	1	4	12
27	(Algeria)	Abdelhak Kadri	MF	2	2	2	6
29	(Algeria)	Abdelkader Ghorab	FW	2	0	3	5
21	(Algeria)	Oussama Kismoun	FW	0	3	2	5
	(Algeria)	Hicham Messiad	MF	1	3	0	4
20	(Algeria)	Hamza Mouali	DF	1	2	1	4
10	(Algeria)	Adem Zorgane	MF	3	0	0	3
11	(Algeria)	Ghiles Guenaoui	FW	2	0	0	2
28	(Algeria)	Adem Redjem	FW	1	0	0	1
6	(Algeria)	Mustapha Bouchina	DF	1	0	0	1
22	(Algeria)	Tarek Bouabta	DF	0	1	0	1
8	(Algeria)	Merouane Zerrouki	FW	0	1	0	1
	(Kenya)	Allan Okello	FW	0	1	0	1
14	(Algeria)	Ishak Salah Eddine Harrari	MF	0	0	1	1
25	(Algeria)	Aimen Bouguerra	DF	0	0	1	1
9	(Algeria)	Riad Benayad	FW	0	0	1	1
Own Goals				0	0	0	0
Totals				20	14	15	49

== Squad list ==
As of 22 January, 2020. Note: Flags indicate national team as defined under FIFA eligibility rules; some limited exceptions apply. Players may hold more than one non-FIFA nationality.

No.	Pos.	Nation	Player
1	GK	ALG	Mokhtar Ferrahi
2	FW	ALG	Abdelhak Elardja
4	MF	ALG	Tayeb Hamoudi
5	DF	ALG	Youcef Douar
6	MF	ALG	Mustapha Bouchina (captain)
7	FW	ALG	Sid Ali Mebarki
8	FW	UGA	Allan Okello
9	FW	ALG	Riad Benayad
10	FW	ALG	Oussama Kismoun
11	FW	ALG	Ghiles Guenaoui
13	DF	ALG	Juba Chirani
14	MF	ALG	Ishak Salah Eddine Harrari
15	MF	ALG	Zakaria Messibah

No.	Pos.	Nation	Player
17	DF	ALG	Anis Bey
18	MF	ALG	Abdeldjalil Tahri
19	MF	ALG	Mohamed Fenniri
20	DF	ALG	Hamza Mouali
21	DF	ALG	Islam Arous
22	DF	ALG	Tarek Bouabta
25	DF	ALG	Aimen Bouguerra
26	FW	ALG	Yousri Bouzok
28	FW	ALG	Adem Redjem
29	FW	ALG	Abdelkader Ghorab
30	GK	ALG	Toufik Moussaoui
48	MF	ALG	Adem Zorgane

== Transfers ==
=== In ===
Date	Pos	Player	from club	Transfer fee	Source
30 June 2019	CB / DM	(Algeria) Raouf Benguit	USM Alger	Loan Return	
30 June 2019	MF	(Algeria) Taher Benkhelifa	JS Kabylie	Loan Return	
30 June 2019	DF	(Algeria) Islam Arous	MC Alger	Loan Return	
21 January 2020	FW	(Uganda) Allan Okello	(Uganda) KCCA	Free transfer	

=== Out ===
Date	Pos	Player	To club	Transfer fee	Source
1 July 2019	DM	(Algeria) Taher Benkhelifa	USM Alger	Loan for one year	
2 July 2019	CB / DM	(Algeria) Raouf Benguit	(Tunisia) Espérance ST	742,000 $	
3 August 2019	FW	(Algeria) Zakaria Naidji	(Portugal) Gil Vicente	Loan for one year	
2 September 2019	MF	(Algeria) Hicham Boudaoui	(France) Nice	4,000,000 €	
5 September 2019	DF	(Algeria) Haithem Loucif	(France) Angers	1,000,000 €	
