= Paradou AC in African football =

- Club: Paradou AC
- Most appearances: Toufik Moussaoui 12
- Top scorer: Yousri Bouzok 4
- First entry: 2019–20 CAF Confederation Cup
- Latest entry: 2019–20 CAF Confederation Cup

Paradou AC, an Algerian professional association football club, has gained entry to Confederation of African Football (CAF) competitions on several occasions. They have represented Algeria in the Confederation Cup on one occasion.

== History ==
Paradou AC whose team has regularly taken part in Confederation of African Football (CAF) competitions. Qualification for Algerian clubs is determined by a team's performance in its domestic league and cup competitions. The first continental participation was in 2019–20 season in the CAF Confederation Cup. The first continental match was against CI Kamsar of Guinea and ended with a 3–0 victory and the first goal scored by Abdelkader Ghorab. Paradou AC has reached the group stage in Group D with FC San Pédro, Hassania Agadir and Enyimba and finished third.

== CAF competitions ==
Paradou AC results in CAF competition
Season	Competition	Round	Opposition	Home	Away	Aggregate
2019–20	Confederation Cup	Preliminary round	(Guinea) CI Kamsar	3–0	0–1	3–1
2019–20	Confederation Cup	First round	(Tunisia) CS Sfaxien	3–1	0–0	3–1
2019–20	Confederation Cup	Play-off round	(Uganda) KCCA	4–1	0–0	4–1
2019–20	Confederation Cup	Group stage	(Ivory Coast) FC San Pédro	0–0	0–0	3rd place
2019–20	Confederation Cup	Group stage	(Morocco) Hassania Agadir	0–2	3–0	3rd place
2019–20	Confederation Cup	Group stage	(Nigeria) Enyimba	1–0	1–4	3rd place

== Statistics ==
=== By season ===
Information correct as of 2 February 2020.
Key

- Pld = Played
- W = Games won
- D = Games drawn
- L = Games lost
- F = Goals for
- A = Goals against
- Grp = Group stage
- PR = Preliminary round
- R1 = First round
- R2 = Second round
- SR16 = Second Round of 16
- R16 = Round of 16
- QF = Quarter-final
- SF = Semi-final

Key to colours and symbols:

W	Winners
RU	Runners-up

Paradou AC record in African football by season
Season	Competition	Pld	W	D	L	GF	GA	GD	Round
2019–20	CAF Confederation Cup	12	5	4	3	15	9	+6	Grp
Total		12	5	4	3	15	9	+6	

=== Overall record ===
==== In Africa ====
As of 2 February 2020:

CAF competitions
Competition	Seasons	Played	Won	Drawn	Lost	Goals For	Goals Against	Last season played
CAF Confederation Cup	1	12	5	4	3	15	9	2019–20
Total	1	12	5	4	3	15	9	

== Statistics by country ==
Statistics correct as of game against Hassania Agadir on February 2, 2020

=== CAF competitions ===
Country	Club	P	W	D	L	GF	GA	GD
Guinea	CI Kamsar	2	1	0	1	3	1	+2
Subtotal		2	1	0	1	3	1	+2
Morocco	Hassania Agadir	2	1	0	1	3	2	+1
Subtotal		2	1	0	1	3	2	+1
Nigeria	Enyimba	2	1	0	1	2	4	−2
Subtotal		2	1	0	1	2	4	−2
Uganda	KCCA	2	1	1	0	4	1	+3
Subtotal		2	1	1	0	4	1	+3
Tunisia	CS Sfaxien	2	1	1	0	3	1	+2
Subtotal		2	1	1	0	3	1	+2
Ivory Coast	FC San Pédro	2	0	2	0	0	0	+0
Subtotal		2	0	2	0	0	0	+0
Total		12	5	4	3	15	9	+6

== African competitions goals ==
Statistics correct as of game against Hassania Agadir on February 2, 2020

Position	Player	TOTAL	CCL	CCC	SC
1	(Algeria) Yousri Bouzok	4	–	4	–
2	(Algeria) Abdelkader Ghorab	3	–	3	–
3	(Algeria) Abdelhak Kadri	2	–	2	–
=	(Algeria) Oussama Kismoun	2	–	2	–
5	(Algeria) Hamza Mouali	1	–	1	–
=	(Algeria) Ishak Salah Eddine Harrari	1	–	1	–
=	(Algeria) Aimen Bouguerra	1	–	1	–
=	(Algeria) Riad Benayad	1	–	1	–
Totals		15	–	15	–

=== Two goals one match ===
N	Date	Player	Match	Score
1	2 February 2020	Oussama Kismoun	Hassania Agadir – Paradou AC	0–3

== List of All-time appearances ==
This List of All-time appearances for Paradou AC in African competitions contains football players who have played for Paradou AC in African football competitions and have managed to accrue 10 or more appearances. As well as participating in UAFA Club Championship for those who have exceeded the limit of 10 African matches only.

Gold Still playing competitive football in Paradou AC.

#	Name	Position	CL1	CCC	SC	TOTAL	UAFA	TOTAL	Date of first cap	Debut against	Date of last cap	Final match against
1	(Algeria) Toufik Moussaoui	GK	–	12	–	12	–	12	9 Aug 2019	CI Kamsar	2 Feb 2020	Hassania Agadir
2	(Algeria) Hamza Mouali	DF	–	11	–	11	–	11	9 Aug 2019	CI Kamsar	—	—
=	(Algeria) Tarek Bouabta	DF	–	11	–	11	–	11	24 Aug 2019	CI Kamsar	—	—
=	(Algeria) Yousri Bouzok	FW	–	11	–	11	–	11	9 Aug 2019	CI Kamsar	—	—
5	(Algeria) Tayeb Hamoudi	MF	–	10	–	10	–	10	9 Aug 2019	CI Kamsar	—	—
=	(Algeria) Adem Zorgane	MF	–	10	–	10	–	10	9 Aug 2019	CI Kamsar	—	—
=	(Algeria) Abdelhak Kadri	MF	–	10	–	10	–	10	24 Aug 2019	CI Kamsar	—	—
=	(Algeria) Ghiles Guenaoui	FW	–	10	–	10	–	10	9 Aug 2019	CI Kamsar	—	—
