= 2019–20 Algerian Cup =

Tournament details
- Country: Algeria
- Dates: 26 December 2019 – Canceled
- Teams: 64 (as of first national round)

Final positions
- Champions: Canceled
- Runners-up: Canceled

Tournament statistics
- Matches played: 56
- Goals scored: 148 (2.64 per match)
- Top goal scorer: Malick Touré (5 goals)

The 2019–20 Algerian Cup (Arabic: كأس الجزائر 20-2019) was the 55th edition of the Algerian Cup. The tournament was suspended in March 2020 due to the COVID-19 pandemic.

== Teams ==
Round	Clubs remaining	Clubs involved	Winners from previous round	New entries this round	Leagues entering at this round
Regional rounds
First round	-	-	-	-	Ligue de Football de la Wilaya; Ligue Régional II; Ligue Régional I Inter-Régions Division
Second round	-	-	-	-	none
Third round	192	-	-	-	Ligue Nationale du Football Amateur; Algerian Ligue Professionnelle 2
Fourth round	96	-	-	-	none
National rounds
Round of 64	64	64	48	16	Algerian Ligue Professionnelle 1
Round of 32	32	32	32	none	none
Round of 16	16	16	16	none	none
Quarter-finals	8	8	8	none	none
Semi-finals	4	4	4	none	none
Final	2	2	2	none	none

== National rounds ==
=== Round of 64 ===
The Round of 64 draw took place on 21 December and was broadcast live on Algérie 3 at 6:00 p.m local time. This round saw two matches between teams from Ligue Professionnelle 1, CS Constantine vs NC Magra and AS Ain M'lila vs JS Kabylie.

26 December 2019	CB Mila	0–0 (a.e.t.) (4–5 p)	Amal Bou Saâda	Mila
14:00		Report		Stadium: Stade Chahid Belkacem Belaid; Referee: Necib, Bayoudh, Ghazali

26 December 2019	MC El Bayadh	0–0 (a.e.t.) (4–3 p)	IB Lakhdaria	El Bayadh
14:00				Stadium: Stade Zakaria Medjdoub; Referee: Bouteraa, Ouierd Benslama, Lattab

26 December 2019	IR Boumedfaa	3–0	NT Souf	Boumedfaâ
14:00	Harizi 12'; Boumediéne 27'; Aida 71'			Stadium: Stade communal de Boumadfaa; Referee: Belkebir, Guezout, Sadoki

26 December 2019	AS Khroub	2–1	JS Bordj Ménaïel	El Khroub
14:00	Moussi 4', 35'	Report	Dedeche 88'	Stadium: Abed Hamdani Stadium; Referee: Aouina, Dilmi, Amroune

26 December 2019	CSA Marsa	2–0	E Sour El Ghozlane	Mers El Kébir
14:00	Ayed 43'; Ournidi 46'			Stadium: Stade Fréres Othmani; Referee: Bettouche, Mokrane, Benarbia

26 December 2019	ARB Gheris	3–0	M Oued Chaaba	Ghriss
14:00	Moussa Laid 68', 76'; Oussama Benaoumeur 86'			Stadium: Stade Boudjellal El Aousedj; Referee: Sardjene, Dellali, Kelaili

26 December 2019	WA Boufarik	3–1	USM Oran	Boufarik
14:00	Hazzi 23'; Oudni 98'; Maameri 110'	Report	Benouadene 70'	Stadium: Stade Mohamed Reggaz; Referee: El Arbi, Arezki, Ziyed

26 December 2019	ASO Chlef	6–1	US Béni Douala	Chlef
14:00	Djahel 35'; Benothmane 39', 53', 75'; Alili 59'; Fellahi 80'	Report	Abaazezane 90+2' (pen.)	Stadium: Stade Mohamed Boumezrag; Referee: Maâskri, Hadji, Zarouki

26 December 2019	Paradou AC	5–0	FC Bir el Arch	Bologhine
14:00	Messiad 28'; Mouali 56'; Kismoun 73' (pen.), 81'; Zerrouki 82'	Report		Stadium: Omar Hamadi Stadium; Referee: Allou, Moukrane, Reeh

26 December 2019	AB Sabath	1–3	NA Hussein Dey	Guelma
14:30	Labser 83' (pen.)	Report	Ait El Hadi 22'; Aït Ferguene 48'; Boutmene 80'	Stadium: Stade Souidani Boujemaa; Referee: Benatia, Bazel, Seguer

26 December 2019	MC Oran	6–1	MJ Arzew	Oran
16:00	Freifer 34'; Mellal 47'; Nadji 51'; Guertil 55', 72'; Ezzemani 77'	Report	Boumaza 16'	Stadium: Ahmed Zabana Stadium; Referee: Zouaoui, Zemit, Benaoui

26 December 2019	JSM Béjaïa	2–2 (a.e.t.) (7–8 p)	ES Sétif	Béjaïa
18:45	Youcef 38'; Khedairia 42' (o.g.)	Report	Kendoussi 32'; Touré 60'	Stadium: Maghrebi Unity Stadium; Referee: Houssam Benyahia

28 December 2019	CR Village Moussa	2–0	WA Tlemcen	Jijel
14:00	Boukef 17'; Yessaad 69'			Stadium: Stade Colonel Amirouche Aït Hammouda; Referee: Boucetta, Aseklou, Toudja

28 December 2019	ASM Oran	5–0	Hydra AC	Oran
14:00	Saci 20'; Boutiche 45' (pen.); Benrokia 54'; Hitala 84', 92'	Report		Stadium: Habib Bouakeul Stadium; Referee: Griche, Bougoufa, Benaboud

28 December 2019	NRB Lardjem	0–0 (a.e.t.) (0–3 p)	AB Chelghoum Laid	Tissemsilt
14:00				Referee: Ahmed Bounneoua
	Penalties
	? (penalty missed) ? (penalty missed) ? (penalty missed)		(penalty scored) Bougatoucha; (penalty scored) Fricha; (penalty scored) Benslim

28 December 2019	ES Guelma	0–0 (a.e.t.) (4–1 p)	USM El Harrach	Guelma
14:00		Report		Stadium: Stade Souidani Boujemaa; Referee: Achouri, Temmane, Benhamouda

28 December 2019	CR Beni Thour	0–2	USM Annaba	Ouargla
14:00		Report	El Houari 16', 90+2' (pen.)	Stadium: Stade 24 février 1971; Referee: Ibrir, Kechida, Chellali

28 December 2019	MSP Batna	3–2 (a.e.t.)	IRB Sougueur	Batna
14:00	Idiou Amir 16'; Aloui Souhail 62'; Ayad 95'	Report	Boukhlifa 12'; Hireche 73'	Stadium: November 1, 1954 Stadium; Referee: Brahim, Badeche, Boulgrinet

28 December 2019	JS Saoura	3–0	DRB Tadjenanet	Béchar
14:00	Hamidi 15' (pen.); Hammia 45+1'; Messaoudi 90'	Report		Stadium: Stade 20 Août 1955; Referee: Bouabdallah, Sarraj, Amrane

28 December 2019	NT Souf	1–3	USM Bel Abbès	El Oued
14:00	Kheir 80' (pen.)	Report	Litt 8'; Soltani 47' (pen.); Metref 61'	Stadium: Stade 20 Août 1955; Referee: Ait Ammar, Samsoum, Laagab

28 December 2019	Olympique de Médéa	3–0	MO Béjaïa	Médéa
14:00	Lakroum 31', 63'; Elghomari 90+3'	Report		Stadium: Stade Imam Lyes; Referee: Amine Sekhraoui

28 December 2019	CRB Adrar	2–1	FCB Telagh	Adrar
14:00				Stadium: Stade Opow de Adrar; Referee: Ahmed Benhamou

28 December 2019	SC Mecheria	1–0	OM Arzew	Mecheria
14:00	Benseha 84'			Stadium: Stade du 20-août-1955 Mecheria; Referee: Hamel

28 December 2019	RC Arbaâ	1–0	MO Constantine	Larbaâ
14:00	Boughalia 18'	Report		Stadium: Ismaïl Makhlouf Stadium; Referee: Ahmed Bouzrar

28 December 2019	CRB Houari Boumediene	0–2	CR Zaouia	Guelma
14:00				Stadium: Stade Lamri Bouaziz

28 December 2019	IS Tighennif	0–2	CR Belouizdad	Tighennif
14:00		Report	Belahouel 32'; Sayoud 70'	Stadium: Stade Hassaïne Lakhel; Referee: Abdelmouméne Belaamri

28 December 2019	MC Alger	2–1 (a.e.t.)	O. Magrane	Bologhine
16:00	Frioui 41'; Bourdim 95'	Report	Bendagich 38'	Stadium: Omar Hamadi Stadium; Referee: Meziani, Louz, Khelladi

28 December 2019	CS Constantine	4–1	NC Magra	Constantine
17:30	Benayada 18'; Lamri 45+1'; Boucheriha 51'; Amokrane 83'	Report	Demane 38'	Stadium: Stade Mohamed Hamlaoui; Referee: Mohamed Saïdi

28 December 2019	CA Bordj Bou Arreridj	3–1	IR Mécheria	Bordj Bou Arréridj
17:30	Arroussi 27'; Gadacha 65'; Belmokhtar 84'	Report	Knanda 21'	Stadium: August 20, 1955 Stadium; Referee: Ali Nader

29 December 2019	NASR El Fedjoudj	1–2	US Biskra	Guelma
14:00	Kara 43'	Report	Dakhia 17' (pen.); Seghier 81'	Stadium: Stade Souidani Boujemaa; Referee: Bahloul, Saadi, Guessoum

5 January 2020	AS Ain M'lila	1–0 (a.e.t.)	JS Kabylie	Aïn M'lila
14:00	Tiaiba 95' (pen.)	Report		Stadium: Touhami Zoubir Khelifi Stadium; Referee: Lotfi Bekouassa

5 January 2020	USM Alger	6–1	USM Khenchela	Bologhine
16:00	Mahious 8' (pen.), 43', 67'; Ardji 54'; Benhammouda 22'; Redjehimi 90+2'	Report	Krioui 26'	Stadium: Omar Hamadi Stadium; Referee: Mohamed Saïdi

=== Round of 32 ===
2 January 2020	SC Mecheria	0–2	USM Bel Abbès	Mécheria
14:00		Report	Litt 31'; Soltani 65'	Stadium: Stade 20 aout 1955; Referee: Bilal Bendjahene

2 January 2020	ASO Chlef	3–1 (a.e.t.)	IR Boumedfaa	Chlef
14:00	Arab 29', 119' (pen.); Fellahi 107'	Report	Meziane 67'	Stadium: Stade Mohamed Boumezrag; Referee: Hamza Bouslimani

2 January 2020	USM Annaba	2–0	CR Village Moussa	Annaba
15:00	Kharoubi 18'; Medafai 72'	Report		Stadium: May 19, 1956 Stadium; Referee: Mehdi Abid Charef

2 January 2020	MC Oran	3–1	ARB Gheris	Oran
17:00	Nadji 23'; Hamidi 32'; Freifer 41'	Report	Attou 50' (pen.)	Stadium: Ahmed Zabana Stadium; Referee: Amar Khoudja, Slaouadji, Henni

4 January 2020	Amal Bou Saâda	2–0	CR Zaouia	M'Sila
14:00	Talbi 39'; Baali 79'			Stadium: Stade Bachir Ouartilane; Referee: Houssam Benyahia

4 January 2020	ES Guelma	2–1	MSP Batna	Guelma
14:00	Hamouda 45'; Krimane 76'		Mezhoudi 26'	Stadium: Stade Souidani Boujemaa; Referee: Amine Hansal

4 January 2020	Olympique de Médéa	0–1	CR Belouizdad	Médéa
14:00		Report	Bouchar 72'	Stadium: Stade Imam Lyes; Referee: Mustapha Ghorbal

4 January 2020	CA Bordj Bou Arreridj	1–0	AS Khroub	Bordj Bou Arréridj
14:00	Amrane 14'	Report		Stadium: August 20, 1955 Stadium; Referee: Hamza Bouslimani

4 January 2020	AB Chelghoum Laid	1–5	ES Sétif	Chelghoum Laïd
14:00	Benmarzoug 90+1' (pen.)	Report	Kendoussi 26'; Touré 42', 72'; Ghacha 53'; Djahnit 62' (pen.)	Stadium: Stade du 11 décembre 1960; Referee: Bahloul, Saadi, Guessoum

5 January 2020	CS Constantine	2–1	JS Saoura	Constantine
16:00	Benayada 41', 77'	Report	Messaoudi 20' (pen.)	Stadium: Stade Mohamed Hamlaoui; Referee: Lahlou Benbraham

5 January 2020	CSA Marsa	0–1	US Biskra	Mers El Kébir
14:00	Boukarroum 52' (pen.)	Report		Stadium: Stade Fréres Othmani; Referee: Farouk Mial

5 January 2020	RC Arbaâ	1–0 (a.e.t.)	NA Hussein Dey	Larbaâ
14:00	Boughalia 103' (pen.)	Report		Stadium: Ismaïl Makhlouf Stadium; Referee: Youcef Gamouh

18 January 2020	CRB Adrar	1–1 (a.e.t.) (4–5 p)	AS Ain M'lila	Adrar
14:00	Hadj Boubakr 24'	Report	Mousaoui 42' (o.g.)	Stadium: Stade 18 février Referee: Ahmed Bouzrar
	Penalties
	? (penalty scored) ? (penalty scored) ? (penalty missed) ? (penalty scored) ? (penalty scored)		(penalty scored) ? (penalty scored) ? (penalty scored) ? (penalty scored) ? (penalty scored) ?

26 January 2020	WA Boufarik	0–0 (a.e.t.) (5–4 p)	MC Alger	Boufarik
14:00				Stadium: Stade Mohamed Reggaz; Referee: Redouane Necib

13 February 2020	Paradou AC	5–0	MC El Bayadh	Bologhine
15:00	Bouzok 15'; Bouabta 55'; Kadri 57'; Messiad 84'; Okello 87'	Report		Stadium: Omar Hamadi Stadium; Referee: Bahloul

13 February 2020	ASM Oran	1–0	USM Alger	Oran
14:00	Belaribi 52'	Report		Stadium: Habib Bouakeul Stadium; Referee: Abdelmoumen Touabti

=== Round of 16 ===
The Round of 16 and Quarter-finals draw took place on 30 January and was broadcast live on Algérie 3 at 6:00 p.m local time.

13 February 2020	WA Boufarik	2–0	MC Oran	Boufarik
14:00	Adel Khettab 45', 54'	Report		Stadium: Stade Mohamed Reggaz; Referee: Youcef Gamouh

13 February 2020	Amal Bou Saâda	1–0	RC Arbaâ	Bou Saâda
14:00	Ghezala 45'	Report		Stadium: Stade Mokhtar Abdelatif; Referee: Redouane Necib

13 February 2020	US Biskra	1–0	CR Belouizdad	Biskra
15:00	Djabout 35' (pen.)	Report		Stadium: Stade du 18 Février; Referee: Farouk Mial

13 February 2020	AS Ain M'lila	1–3	CA Bordj Bou Arreridj	Aïn M'lila
15:00	Debbih 70'	Report	Belameiri 24'; Benayad 45'; Djahnit 57'	Stadium: Touhami Zoubir Khelifi Stadium; Referee: Abderrezzak Arab

13 February 2020	USM Bel Abbès	1–0	USM Annaba	Sidi Bel Abbès
15:00	Bouguettaya 61'	Report		Stadium: Stade 24 Fevrier 1956; Referee: Amine Sekhraoui

13 February 2020	ES Sétif	2–1	CS Constantine	Sétif
18:45	Touré 47'; Boussouf 83'	Report	Benayada 40'	Stadium: Stade 8 Mai 1945; Referee: Lyés Bekouassa

3 March 2020	ASM Oran	1–0	ASO Chlef	Oran
14:00	Hitala 45'	Report		Stadium: Habib Bouakeul Stadium; Referee: Amine Hansal

3 March 2020	ES Guelma	0–0 (a.e.t.) (3–4 p)	Paradou AC	Guelma
14:00		Report		Stadium: Stade Souidani Boujemaa; Referee: Ali Nader

=== Quarter-finals ===
10 March 2020 1st leg	CA Bordj Bou Arreridj	1–1	ES Sétif	Bordj Bou Arreridj
16:00	Yousif 90+5'	Soccerway report	Touré 66'	Stadium: August 20, 1955 Stadium; Referee: Mohamed Boutaraa

TBD 2nd leg	ES Sétif	Canceled	CA Bordj Bou Arreridj	Sétif
TBD		[ Soccerway report]		Stadium: Stade 8 Mai 1945; Attendance: 0 (close doors)
Note: due to coronavirus outbreak, Ministry of Health, Population and Hospital Reform decided to be all matches played behind closed doors.

10 March 2020 1st leg	US Biskra	1–1	WA Boufarik	Biskra
15:00	Mokhtar 75'	Soccerway report	Mammeri 2'	Stadium: Stade du 18 Février; Referee: Malek Ait Ameur

TBD 2nd leg	WA Boufarik	Canceled	US Biskra	Boufarik
TBD		[ Soccerway report]		Stadium: Stade Mohamed Reggaz; Attendance: 0 (close doors)
Note: due to coronavirus outbreak, Ministry of Health, Population and Hospital Reform decided to be all matches played behind closed doors.

11 March 2020 1st leg	USM Bel Abbès	3–0	Amal Bou Saâda	Sidi Bel Abbès
16:00	Barka 30'; Litt 80'; Hamza 90+3'	Soccerway report		Stadium: Stade 24 Fevrier 1956; Attendance: 0 (close doors); Referee: Redouane Necib
Note: due to coronavirus outbreak, Ministry of Health, Population and Hospital Reform decided to be all matches played behind closed doors.

TBD 2nd leg	Amal Bou Saâda	Canceled	USM Bel Abbès	Bou Saâda
TBD		[ Soccerway report]		Stadium: Stade Mokhtar Abdelatif; Attendance: 0 (close doors)
Note: due to coronavirus outbreak, Ministry of Health, Population and Hospital Reform decided to be all matches played behind closed doors.

11 March 2020 1st leg	Paradou AC	4–1	ASM Oran	Dar El Beïda
15:00	Kadri 5'; Mouali 16'; Messiad 65'; Kismoun 90+3'	Soccerway report	Benrokia 9'	Stadium: Omar Benrabah Stadium; Attendance: 0 (close doors); Referee: Said Aouina
Note: due to coronavirus outbreak, Ministry of Health, Population and Hospital Reform decided to be all matches played behind closed doors.

TBD 2nd leg	ASM Oran	Canceled	Paradou AC	Oran
TBD		[ Soccerway report]		Stadium: Habib Bouakeul Stadium; Attendance: 0 (close doors)
Note: due to coronavirus outbreak, Ministry of Health, Population and Hospital Reform decided to be all matches played behind closed doors.

=== Semi-finals ===
TBD 1st leg	Canceled
TBD	[ Soccerway report]

TBD 2nd leg	Canceled
TBD	[ Soccerway report]

TBD 1st leg	Canceled
TBD	[ Soccerway report]

TBD 2nd leg	Canceled
TBD	[ Soccerway report]

=== Final ===
TBD
TBD

Canceled
[ Soccerway report]

,

== Top goalscorers ==
As of 11 March 2020.

Note: Players and teams in bold are still active in the competition.

Rank	Player	Club	Goals
1	(Mali) **Malick Touré**	**ES Sétif**	4
1	(Algeria) Houcine Benayada	CS Constantine	4
3	(Algeria) Mansour Benothmane	ASO Chlef	3
3	(Algeria) Aymen Mahious	USM Alger	3
5	15 players		2
