= Adem Zorgane =

Algerian footballer (born 2000)

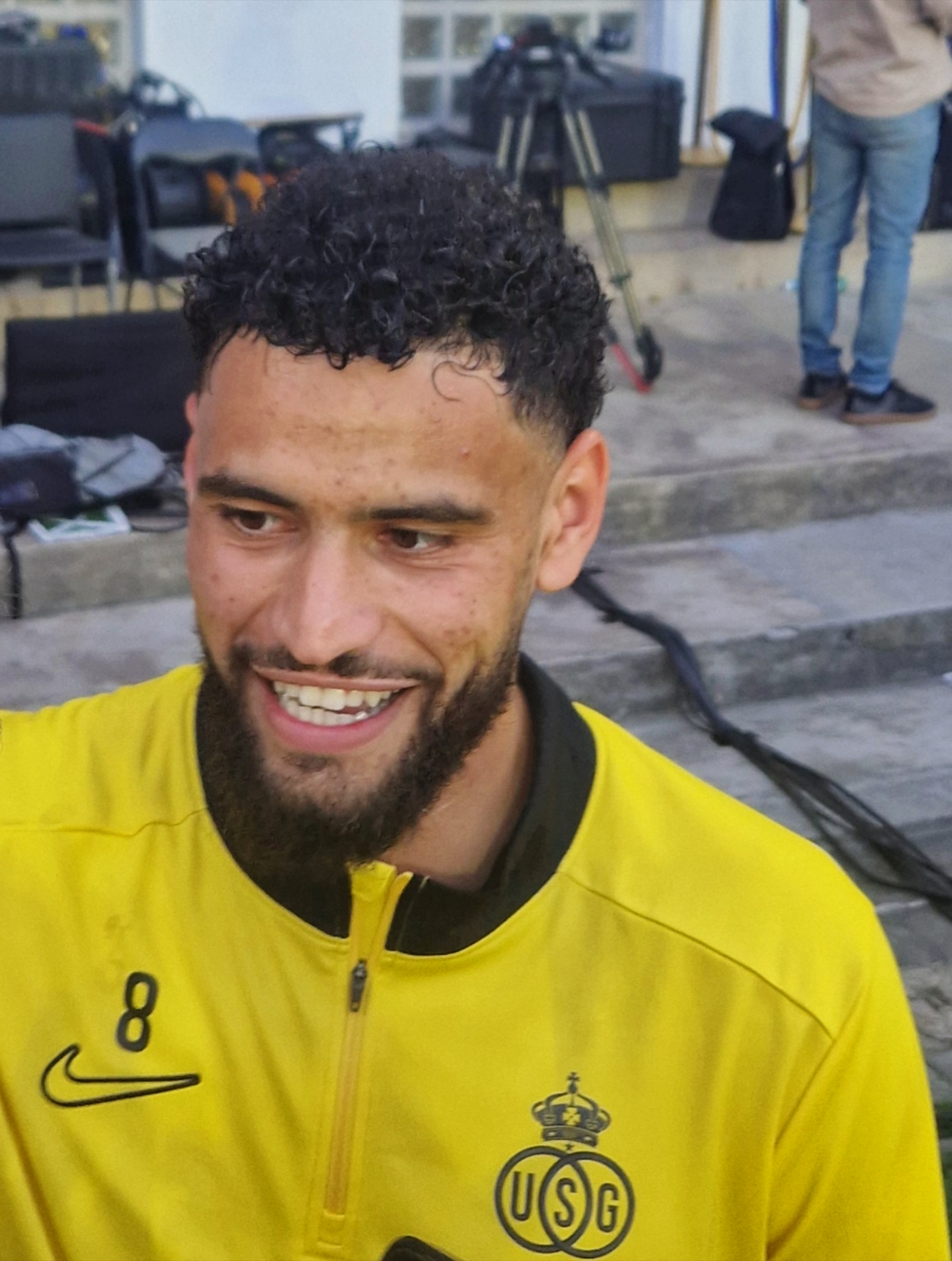
- Zorgane in 2026 with Union Saint-Gilloise

Personal information
- Date of birth: 6 January 2000 (age 26)
- Place of birth: Sétif, Algeria
- Height: 1.84 m (6 ft 0 in)
- Position: Midfielder

Team information
- Current team: Union Saint-Gilloise
- Number: 8

Youth career
- ES Sétif
- –2018: Paradou AC

Senior career*
Years	Team	Apps	(Gls)
2018–2021	Paradou AC	71	(8)
2021–2025	Sporting Charleroi	136	(10)
2025–	Union Saint-Gilloise	44	(5)

International career^{‡}
2018	Algeria U23	2	(1)
2019–2021	Algeria A'	3	(0)
2019–	Algeria	25	(1)
- * Club domestic league appearances and goals as of 25 October 2026 ‡ National team caps and goals as of 29 September 2026 (UTC)

Adem Zorgane (Arabic: آدم زرقان; born 6 January 2000) is an Algerian professional footballer who plays as a midfielder for Union Saint-Gilloise and the Algeria national team. He is the son of former Algeria international Malik Zorgane.

== Club career ==
=== Paradou AC ===
On 13 August 2018, Zorgane made his senior debut for Paradou AC, becoming the first ever player born in the year 2000 to play in the Algerian Ligue Professionnelle 1.

=== Charleroi ===
On 27 June 2021, Zorgane signed a four-year contract with Belgian First Division A club Charleroi. He made his debut for the club in the Belgian First Division A on 8 August, scoring his first goal in the eighth minute of a 1–1 draw against OH Leuven. In his first season with Charleroi, Zorgane quickly established himself as a starter, making 37 total appearances in which he scored three goals.

=== Union Saint-Gilloise ===
On 26 June 2025, Zorgane joined Union Saint-Gilloise by signing a contract until 2029.

== International career ==
In the summer of 2018, Zorgane was part of Algeria's under-18 national team at the 2018 Mediterranean Games in Tarragona, Spain.

== Career statistics ==
=== Club ===
As of match played 25 October 2026

Appearances and goals by club, season and competition
Club	Season	League			National cup (Note: Includes Algerian Cup, Belgian Cup)		Continental		Other		Total	
Club	Season	Division	Apps	Goals	Apps	Goals	Apps	Goals	Apps	Goals	Apps	Goals
Paradou AC	2018–19	Algerian Ligue 1	25	2	5	1	—		—		30	3
Paradou AC	2019–20	Algerian Ligue 1	19	3	2	0	10 (Note: Appearances in CAF Confederation Cup)	0	—		31	3
Paradou AC	2020–21	Algerian Ligue 1	27	3	—		—		1 (Note: Appearances in Algerian Super Cup)	0	28	3
Paradou AC	Total		71	8	7	1	10	0	1	0	89	9
R. Charleroi	2021–22	Belgian Pro League	36	3	1	0	—		—		37	3
R. Charleroi	2022–23	Belgian Pro League	32	4	1	0	—		—		33	4
R. Charleroi	2023–24	Belgian Pro League	28	2	1	0	—		—		29	2
R. Charleroi	2024–25	Belgian Pro League	40	1	1	0	—		—		41	1
R. Charleroi	Total		136	10	4	0	—		—		140	10
Union SG	2025–26	Belgian Pro League	37	4	5	0	8 (Note: Appearances in UEFA Champions League)	0	1 (Note: Appearance in Belgian Super Cup)	0	52	4
Union SG	2026–27	Belgian Pro League	7	1	0	0	1 (Note: One appearance in UEFA Champions League)	0	1	0	9	1
Union SG	Total		44	5	5	0	9	0	2	0	61	5
Career total			253	23	16	1	19	0	3	0	290	24

=== International ===
As of match played 31 December 2025

Appearances and goals by national team and year
National team	Year	Apps	Goals
Algeria	2019	2	0
Algeria	2021	4	0
Algeria	2022	6	0
Algeria	2023	3	0
Algeria	2024	5	1
Algeria	2025	4	0
Total		24	1

Scores and results list Algeria's goal tally first, score column indicates score after each Zorgane goal.

List of international goals scored by Adem Zorgane
No.	Date	Venue	Opponent	Score	Result	Competition
1	10 September 2024	Samuel Kanyon Doe Sports Complex, Paynesville, Liberia	Liberia	2–0	3–0	2025 Africa Cup of Nations qualification

== Honours ==
Union SG

- Belgian Cup: 2025–26
- Belgian Super Cup: 2026
