= Youcef Atal =

Algerian footballer (born 1996)

Youcef Atal يوسف عطال
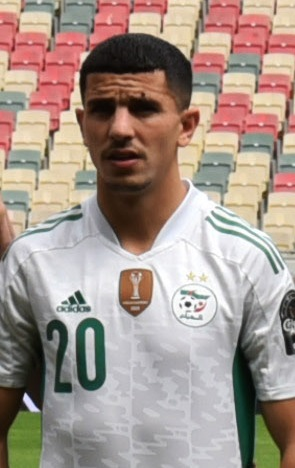
- Atal with Algeria in 2022

Personal information
- Full name: Youcef Atal
- Date of birth: 17 May 1996 (age 30)
- Place of birth: Boghni, Algeria
- Height: 1.76 m (5 ft 9 in)
- Position: Right-back

Team information
- Current team: Al Sadd
- Number: 20

Youth career
- 2006–2008: CR Belouizdad
- 2008–2011: JS Kabylie
- 2011–2012: USM Alger
- 2012–2014: JS Kabylie
- 2014–2015: Paradou AC

Senior career*
Years	Team	Apps	(Gls)
2015–2018	Paradou AC	46	(5)
2017–2018	→ Kortrijk (loan)	10	(0)
2018–2024	Nice	101	(12)
2024	Adana Demirspor	11	(1)
2024–	Al Sadd	12	(2)

International career^{‡}
2017–	Algeria	55	(2)
Medal record
Men's football
Representing Algeria
Africa Cup of Nations
Winner	2019 Egypt
- * Club domestic league appearances and goals as of 17 January 2026 ‡ National team caps and goals as of 23:59, 31 December 2025 (UTC)

Youcef Atal (Arabic: يوسف عطال; born 17 May 1996) is an Algerian professional footballer who plays as a right-back for Al Sadd and the Algeria national team.

== Club career ==
After beginning his professional career in his native Algeria with Paradou AC, Atal was sent on loan to Belgian club KV Kortrijk in 2017. Despite a season in which he suffered a myriad of injuries, Kortrijk nevertheless decided to exercise the purchase option in the loan. Atal joined French club Nice from Kortrijk in 2018, and started the opening match of the season. He scored his first goal for his new side in November, recorded a hat-trick in April, and ended his first season with six total goals. He underwent surgery in December 2019 to repair a torn meniscus.

On 9 February 2024, Atal signed for Turkish Süper Lig club Adana Demirspor until the end of the season.

In September 2024, Al-Sadd SC of the Qatar Stars League signed Atal to a two-year contract.

== International career ==
On 1 June 2017, Atal was called up to the Algeria national team for the first time for a friendly match against Guinea and a 2019 Africa Cup of Nations qualifier against Togo.

In December 2023, he was named in Algeria's squad for the 2023 Africa Cup of Nations.

== Controversy ==
On 14 October 2023, amidst the Gaza war, Atal posted a video on social media of Palestinian preacher Mahmoud al-Hasanat asking God to "send Jewish people a dark day". He quickly removed the video after receiving criticism, notably from Nice mayor Christian Estrosi, who stated that unless Atal "denounces Hamas terrorists, he no longer has a place at [OGC Nice]". Atal subsequently published a message on Instagram apologizing for posting the video, and clarified his beliefs by stating that he "denounce[s] all forms of violence". On 16 October, the Nice public prosecutor's office initiated a preliminary investigation into Atal on charges of "defending terrorism". Two days later, OGC Nice suspended Atal until further notice after the antisemitic post. On 25 October, he was suspended for seven matches by the Ligue de Football Professionnel for posting the message.

On the 24 November, Atal was detained by French Police over the antisemitic posts. In January 2024, Atal was convicted of inciting religious hatred and given an eight-month suspended sentence.

== Career statistics ==
=== International ===
As of match played 31 December 2025

Appearances and goals by national team and year
National team	Year	Apps	Goals
Algeria	2017	4	0
Algeria	2018	2	1
Algeria	2019	12	0
Algeria	2021	4	0
Algeria	2022	7	1
Algeria	2023	5	0
Algeria	2024	10	0
Algeria	2025	10	0
Total		54	2

Algeria score listed first, score column indicates score after each Atal goal.

List of international goals scored by Youcef Atal
No.	Date	Venue	Cap	Opponent	Score	Result	Competition	Ref.
1	18 November 2018	Stade Municipal, Lomé, Togo	6	Togo	2–0	4–1	2019 Africa Cup of Nations qualification	
2	27 September 2022	Olympic Stadium, Oran, Algeria	28	Nigeria	2–1	2–1	Friendly	

== Honours ==
Paradou AC

- Algerian Ligue Professionnelle 2: 2016–17

Nice

- Coupe de France runner-up: 2021–22

Algeria

- Africa Cup of Nations: 2019

=== Individual ===
- El Heddaf Algerian Young Player of the Year: 2017
- France Football Maghreb Team of the Year: 2018
- France Football African Team of the Year: 20182019
- L'Équipe Ligue 1 Team of the Season: 2018–19
