= Islam Arous =

Algerian footballer (born 1996)

Personal information
- Full name: Islam Arous
- Date of birth: 6 August 1996 (age 30)
- Place of birth: Birtouta, Algeria
- Height: 1.73 m (5 ft 8 in)
- Position: Right-back

Team information
- Current team: ESM Koléa
- Number: 28

Youth career
- 2009–2015: Paradou AC

Senior career*
Years	Team	Apps	(Gls)
2015–2021	Paradou AC	28	(0)
2018–2019	→ MC Alger	25	(0)
2025–	ESM Koléa	7	(0)

International career^{‡}
2017–	Algeria	1	(0)
- * Club domestic league appearances and goals as of 31 August 2021 ‡ National team caps and goals as of 00:00, November 17, 2017 (EST)

Islam Arous (born 6 August 1996) is an Algerian footballer who plays for ESM Koléa.

== Career ==
In November 2017, Arous was called up to the Algeria national team for the first time for a 2018 FIFA World Cup qualifier against Nigeria and a friendly match against the Central African Republic. On 14 November Arous made his international debut, starting in the 3–0 win over Central African Republic.

== Honours ==
Paradou AC

- Algerian Ligue Professionnelle 2: 2016–17
