= Zakaria Mansouri =

Algerian footballer (born 1995)

Personal information
- Full name: Zakaria Mansouri
- Date of birth: 1 November 1995 (age 31)
- Place of birth: Tlemcen, Algeria
- Height: 1.69 m (5 ft 6 1/2 in)
- Position: Midfielder

Youth career
- –2008: WA Tlemcen
- 2008–2015: Paradou AC

Senior career*
| Years | Team | Apps | (Gls) |
| 2015–2021 | Paradou AC | – | (–) |
| 2016–2018 | → MC Alger (loan) | 13 | (2) |
| 2018–2020 | → MC Oran (loan) | 58 | (13) |
| 2020–2021 | → CS Sfaxien (loan) | 14 | (0) |
| 2021–2022 | JS Kabylie | 30 | (0) |
| 2023–2026 | Al-Ahly SC | 31 | (5) |
- * Club domestic league appearances and goals as of 11 June 2026

Zakaria Mansouri (born 1 November 1995) is an Algerian footballer.

== Club career ==
In January 2017, Mansouri signed an 18-month loan contract with MC Alger.

In 2018, he signed an 18-month loan contract with MC Oran. In 2020, he signed a one-year loan contract with CS Sfaxien.

In 2021, he joined JS Kabylie.

In 2023, he joined Al-Ahly SC.
