= Abdelkader Ghorab =

Algerian footballer (born 1998)

Personal information
- Full name: Abdelkader Ghorab
- Date of birth: February 28, 1998 (age 28)
- Place of birth: Hachem, Algeria
- Position: Forward

Team information
- Current team: US Biskra
- Number: 29

Youth career
- Paradou AC

Senior career*
Years	Team	Apps	(Gls)
2017–2022	Paradou AC	39	(2)
2021–2022	→ HB Chelghoum Laïd	27	(2)
2022–2023	MC El Bayadh	13	(1)
2023	Al Hilal		
2024	Al-Anwar		
2024–2025	JS Saoura	24	(2)
2025	USM Khenchela	1	(0)
2025–2026	Al-Wefaq	7	(2)
2026	Al-Madina	2	(0)
2026–	US Biskra	0	(0)
- * Club domestic league appearances and goals as of 29 July 2026

Abdelkader Ghorab (born February 28, 1998) is an Algerian footballer who plays for US Biskra.

== Club career ==
On August 9, 2019, Ghorab scored Paradou's first ever goal in African competition in the 3–0 win over CI Kamsar of Guinea in the preliminary round of the 2019–20 CAF Confederation Cup.

On 12 September 2021, he joined HB Chelghoum Laïd, on loan from Paradou AC.

On 31 January 2023, he joined Libyan club Al Hilal..

On 10 September 2024, he signed for JS Saoura.

On 17 August 2025, he joined USM Khenchela. 8 days later, he left the club after only one official match.

On 29 July 2026, he joined US Biskra.
