= Zakaria Naidji =

Algerian professional footballer (born 1995)

Personal information
- Date of birth: 19 January 1995 (age 31)
- Place of birth: Bordj Bou Arreridj, Algeria
- Height: 1.77 m (5 ft 10 in)
- Position: Striker

Team information
- Current team: MC Alger
- Number: 24

Youth career
- 2009–2016: Paradou AC

Senior career*
Years	Team	Apps	(Gls)
2017–2023	Paradou AC	53	(31)
2019	→ Gil Vicente (loan)	20	(1)
2020	→ Club Africain (loan)	0	(0)
2021	→ USM Alger (loan)	14	(4)
2021–2022	→ Pau (loan)	26	(4)
2022–2023	Laval	32	(7)
2023–	MC Alger	79	(22)

International career
2019	Algeria	1	(0)
- * Club domestic league appearances and goals as of 5 June 2026

Zakaria Naidji (Arabic: زكرياء نعيجي; born 19 January 1995) is an Algerian professional footballer who plays for Algerian Ligue Professionnelle 1 club MC Alger. He played one match for the Algeria national team in 2019.

== Club career ==
Naidji was the top scorer of the 2018–19 Algerian Ligue Professionnelle 1 with 20 goals. Across all competitions, he scored a total of 21 goals and made seven assists during the season.

In August 2019, Naidji joined Portuguese liga NOS club Gil Vicente on loan from Paradou AC. It was reported Gil Vicente paid €50,000 for the loan and also secured an option to sign him permanently for €1.4 million. In March 2021, Naidji joined USM Alger on loan from Paradou AC. In September 2021, he joined Pau FC on loan from Paradou AC. In July 2021, Naidji joined Laval from Paradou AC.

In August 2023, he joined MC Alger.

== International career ==
Naidji made his debut with the Algeria national football team on 22 March 2019 in an African Cup of Nations qualifier against Gambia, as a 64th-minute substitute for Oussama Darfalou.

== Career statistics ==
=== Club ===
As of 26 May 2019

Club	Season	League			Cup		Continental		Other		Total	
Club	Season	Division	Apps	Goals	Apps	Goals	Apps	Goals	Apps	Goals	Apps	Goals
Paradou AC	2017–18	Ligue Professionnelle 1	23	11	0	0	—		—		23	11
Paradou AC	2018–19	Ligue Professionnelle 1	30	20	1	1	—		—		31	21
Paradou AC	Total		53	31	1	1	—		—		54	32
Career total			49	30	1	1	—		—		49	30

== Honours ==
- Algerian Ligue Professionnelle 1 top scorer: 2018–19
