= 2016–17 Algerian Ligue Professionnelle 2 =

Algerian Ligue Professionnelle 2
- Season: 2016–17
- Champions: Paradou AC
- Promoted: Paradou AC; USM Blida; US Biskra
- Relegated: WA Boufarik; RC Arbaâ; AS Khroub
- Matches played: 240
- Goals scored: 466 (1.94 per match)

The 2016–17 Algerian Ligue Professionnelle 2 will be the 53rd season of the Algerian Ligue Professionnelle 2 since its establishment, and its seventh season under its current title. A total of 16 teams will contest the league.

== Team overview ==
=== Stadia and locations ===
Locations of teams in the 2015–16 Algerian Ligue Professionnelle 2

Team	Location	Stadium	Capacity
Amel Bou Saâda	Bou Saâda	Stade Mokhtar Abdelatif	8,000
AS Khroub	El Khroub	Stade Abed Hamdani	10,000
ASM Oran	Oran	Stade Habib Bouakeul	20,000
ASO Chlef	Chlef	Stade Mohamed Boumezrag	18,000
CA Bordj Bou Arréridj	Bordj Bou Arréridj	Stade 20 Août 1955	15,000
CRB Aïn Fakroun	Aïn Fakroun	Stade des Frères Demane-Debih	7,000
GC Mascara	Mascara	Stade de l'Unité Africaine	22,000
JSM Béjaïa	Béjaïa	Stade de l'Unité Maghrébine	17,500
JSM Skikda	Skikda	Stade 20 Août 1955	25,000
MC El Eulma	El Eulma	Stade Messaoud Zougar	25,000
MC Saïda	Saïda	Stade 13 Avril 1958	25,000
Paradou AC	Algiers	Stade Omar Hamadi	17,000
RC Arbaâ	Larbaâ	Stade Ismaïl Makhlouf	8,000
US Biskra	Biskra	Complexe Sportif d'El Alia	30,000
USM Blida	Blida	Stade Frères Brakni	8,000
WA Boufarik	Boufarik	Stade Mohamed Reggaz	10,000

== League table ==
Pos	Team	Pld	W	D	L	GF	GA	GD	Pts	Qualification or relegation
1	Paradou AC (P)	30	19	5	6	43	23	+20	62	2017–18 Algerian Ligue Professionnelle 1
2	USM Blida (P)	30	14	9	7	31	19	+12	51	2017–18 Algerian Ligue Professionnelle 1
3	US Biskra (P)	30	15	6	9	36	26	+10	51	2017–18 Algerian Ligue Professionnelle 1
4	JSM Béjaïa	30	13	7	10	33	30	+3	46	
5	JSM Skikda	30	13	6	11	33	23	+10	45	
6	A Bou Saâda	30	10	10	10	32	31	+1	40	
7	ASO Chlef	30	10	10	10	31	31	0	40	
8	MC Saïda	30	10	10	10	28	30	−2	40	
9	MC El Eulma	30	10	9	11	28	28	0	36 (Note: MC El Eulma and RC Arbaâ were deducted 3 points.)	
10	ASM Oran	30	7	15	8	30	32	−2	36	
11	CA Bordj Bou Arréridj	30	9	9	12	25	31	−6	36	
12	CRB Aïn Fakroun	30	8	12	10	26	33	−7	36	
13	GC Mascara	30	8	11	11	26	31	−5	35	
14	WA Boufarik (R)	30	6	14	10	22	31	−9	32	2017–18 Championnat National Amateur
15	RC Arbaâ (R)	30	7	10	13	26	29	−3	28	2017–18 Championnat National Amateur
16	AS Khroub (R)	30	5	9	16	22	43	−21	24	2017–18 Championnat National Amateur

Updated to match(es) played on 6 May 2016. Source: DZFOOT.COM
Rules for classification: 1) points; 2) goal difference; 3) number of goals scored.
(P) Promoted; (R) Relegated

== Season statistics ==
=== Top scorers ===
Rank	Scorer	Club	Goals
1	(Algeria) Adil Djabout	US Biskra	14
2	(Algeria) Tayeb Meziani	Paradou AC	12
3	(Algeria) Mustapha Melika	ASO Chlef	11
4	(Algeria) Zakaria Naidji	Paradou AC	9
4	(Algeria) Cheikh Hamidi	MC Saida	9
5	(Algeria) Hamza Ounnas	JSM Béjaïa	8
6	(Algeria) Laïd Madouni	CA Bordj Bou Arréridj	7
6	(Algeria) Makhlouf Keffi	CRB Ain Fakroun	7
6	(Algeria) Salim Djabali	MC El Eulma	7
6	(Algeria) Fouzi Boulainine	AS Khroub	7
6	(Algeria) Youcef Zerguine	USM Blida	7

== Media coverage ==
Algerian Ligue Professionnelle 1 Media Coverage
Country	Television Channel	Matches
Algeria	EPTV Terrestre	1 Match per round
Algeria	Dzair TV	1 Match per round

== See also ==
- 2016–17 Algerian Ligue Professionnelle 1
- 2016–17 Algerian Cup
