= Mustapha Bouchina =

Algerian footballer (born 1991)

Personal information
- Date of birth: 10 August 1991 (age 35)
- Place of birth: Hammamet, Algeria
- Height: 1.71 m (5 ft 7 in)
- Position: Centre-back

Team information
- Current team: JS El Biar
- Number: 15

Youth career
- –2013: Paradou AC

Senior career*
Years	Team	Apps	(Gls)
2013–2020	Paradou AC	87	(4)
2020–2024	USM Alger	80	(1)
2024–2025	RC Kouba		
2025–	JS El Biar	21	(1)
- * Club domestic league appearances and goals as of 17 July 2026

Mustapha Bouchina (Arabic: مصطفى بوشينة; born 10 August 1991) is an Algerian professional footballer who most recently played as a Centre-back for JS El Biar.

== Career ==
From 2013 to 2020, Bouchina played for Paradou AC. In 2020, he signed a two-year contract with USM Alger. In 2024, he joined RC Kouba. In 2025, he joined JS El Biar.

== Honours ==
USM Alger

- CAF Confederation Cup: 2022–23
