= Riad Benayad =

Algerian footballer (born 1996)

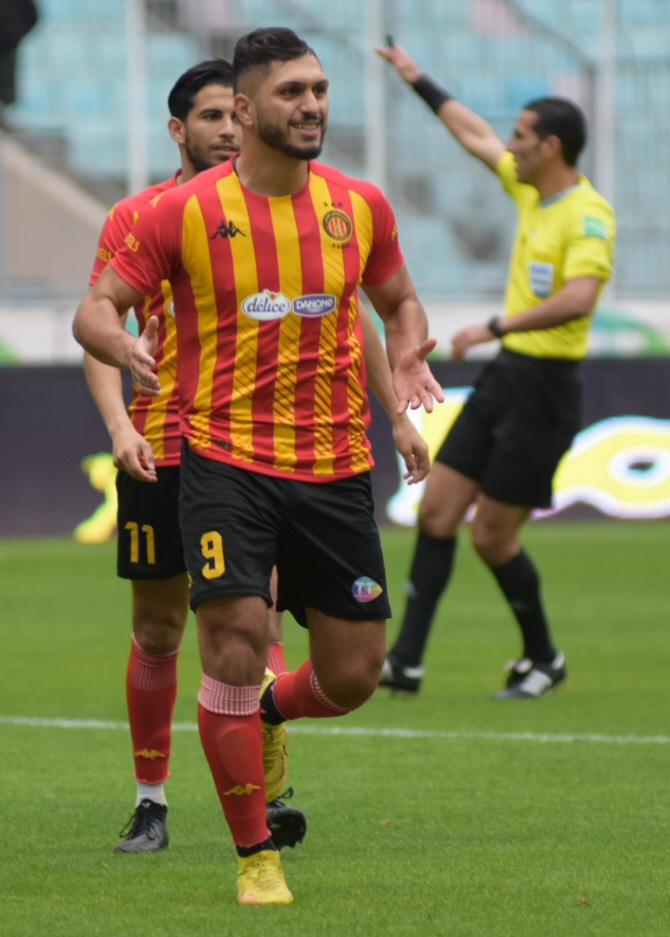

Personal information
- Full name: Riad Benayad
- Date of birth: 2 November 1996 (age 30)
- Place of birth: Algiers, Algeria
- Height: 1.78 m (5 ft 10 in)
- Position: Forward

Team information
- Current team: ES Sétif
- Number: 9

Youth career
- –2017: Paradou AC

Senior career*
Years	Team	Apps	(Gls)
2017–2022	Paradou AC	75	(14)
2021–2022	→ ES Sétif (loan)	31	(12)
2022–2025	Espérance de Tunis	25	(5)
2024	→ Raja CA (loan)	9	(2)
2025–2026	USM Alger	37	(4)
2026–	ES Sétif	0	(0)

International career^{‡}
2022–	Algeria	2	(1)
- * Club domestic league appearances and goals as of 6 June 2026 ‡ National team caps and goals as of 12 June 2022

Riad Benayad (Arabic: رياض بن عياد; born 2 November 1996) is an Algerian footballer who plays as a forward for ES Sétif.

== Club career ==
On 29 September 2017, Benayad made his professional debut for Paradou AC, coming as a second-half substitute in a league match against JS Saoura. In 2022, he joined Espérance de Tunis. On 24 August 2021, he signed he was loaned to ES Sétif. On 29 January 2025, he joined USM Alger. On 27 August 2026, he returned to ES Sétif.

== International career ==
Benayed was called up to the Algeria national team in May 2022. He marked his debut with Algeria national football team as substitute in a 2023 Africa Cup of Nations qualification match against Tanzania that Algeria won 2–0.

== Honours ==
Paradou

- Algerian Ligue 2: 2016–17

Raja CA

- Botola: 2023–24
- Moroccan Throne Cup: 2023–24

USM Alger

- Algerian Cup: 2024–25, 2025–26
- CAF Confederation Cup: 2025–26
