= Aimen Bouguerra =

Algerian footballer (born 1997)

Personal information
- Full name: Aimen Bouguerra
- Date of birth: 10 January 1997 (age 29)
- Place of birth: Bordj Ghedir
- Height: 1.70 m (5 ft 7 in)
- Position: Defender

Team information
- Current team: MC Alger
- Number: 25

Youth career
- 2012–2015: ES Setif
- 2015–2017: Paradou AC

Senior career*
Years	Team	Apps	(Gls)
2017–2022	Paradou AC	77	(2)
2022–2024	CR Belouizdad	20	(2)
2024–2025	CS Constantine	30	(1)
2025–	MC Alger	21	(1)

International career^{‡}
2016	Algeria U20	2	(0)
2018–2019	Algeria U23	4	(0)
2021–	Algeria A'	5	(1)
Medal record
Men's football
Representing Algeria
FIFA Arab Cup
Winner	2021 Qatar
- * Club domestic league appearances and goals as of 5 June 2026 ‡ National team caps and goals as of 9 June 2022

Aimen Bouguerra (Arabic: أيمن بوقرة; born 10 January 1997) is an Algerian professional footballer who plays as a defender for MC Alger, and the Algerian national team.

== Career ==
In 2022, Bouguerra signed a contract with CR Belouizdad. On 31 January 2024, he signed a contract with CS Constantine. On 14 July 2025, he joined MC Alger.

== Honours ==
Algeria

- FIFA Arab Cup: 2021
