= Bologhine =

Coordinates: 36°48′19″N 3°02′34″E

- Interactive map of Bologhine
- Country: Algeria
- Province: Algiers
- Time zone: UTC+1 (West Africa Time)

Bologhine is a suburb of the city of Algiers in northern Algeria. It is named after Buluggin ibn Ziri, who founded the city in 944.

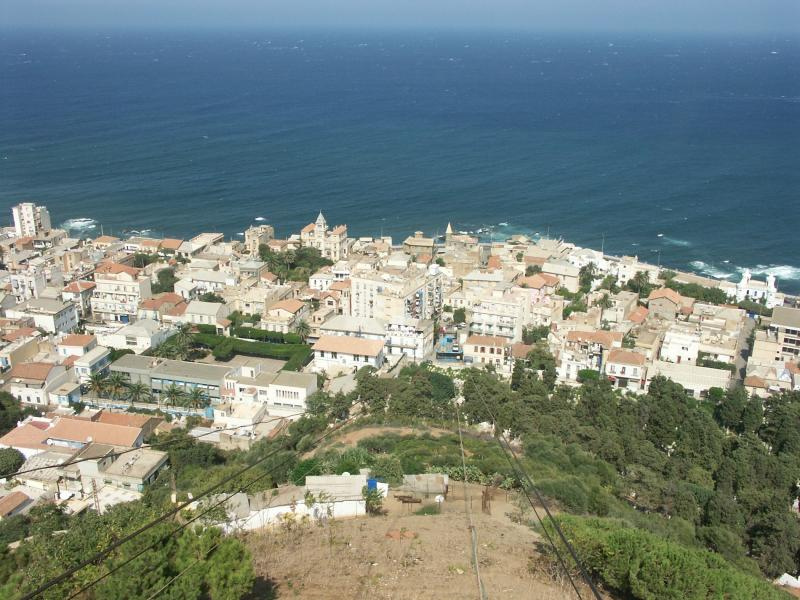
Bologhine
