= Toufik Moussaoui =

Algerian footballer (born 1991)

Personal information
- Date of birth: 20 April 1991 (age 35)
- Place of birth: Hussein Dey, Algeria
- Height: 1.96 m (6 ft 5 in)
- Position: Goalkeeper

Team information
- Current team: JS El Biar
- Number: 30

Senior career*
Years	Team	Apps	(Gls)
2014–2015	JS Hai Djebel	-	(-)
2015–2020	Paradou AC	55	(0)
2020–2022	CR Belouizdad	50	(0)
2022–2023	OC Khouribga	0	(0)
2023–2024	Paradou AC	29	(0)
2024–2026	MC Alger	13	(0)
2025–2026	→ Paradou AC (loan)	14	(0)
2026–	JS El Biar	1	(0)

International career
2018–	Algeria	1	(0)
- * Club domestic league appearances and goals as of 3 September 2026

Toufik Moussaoui (Arabic: توفيق موساوي; born 20 April 1991) is an Algerian professional footballer who plays as a goalkeeper for JS El Biar.

== Career ==
In July 2017, Moussaoui was called up by Lucas Alcaraz to the Algeria A' national football team for a pair of CHAN 2018 qualifiers against Libya. On 7 September 2020, he joined CR Belouizdad. On 27 August 2022, he joined OC Khouribga. On 8 July 2024, he joined MC Alger. On 25 August 2025n he was loaned to Paradou AC. On 17 August 2026, he joined JS El Biar.
