= Yousri Bouzok =

Algerian footballer (born 1996)

Personal information
- Date of birth: 18 August 1996 (age 30)
- Place of birth: Constantine, Algeria
- Height: 1.75 m (5 ft 9 in)
- Position: Winger

Team information
- Current team: CR Belouizdad
- Number: 26

Youth career
- –2016: Paradou AC

Senior career*
Years	Team	Apps	(Gls)
2016–2022	Paradou AC	138	(40)
2022–2024	Raja CA	94	(23)
2025–2026	Al-Raed	53	(11)
2026–	CR Belouizdad	1	(1)
- * Club domestic league appearances and goals as of 7 July 2026

Yousri Bouzok (Arabic: يسري بوزوق; born 18 August 1996) is an Algerian professional footballer who plays as a winger for Algerian Ligue Professionnelle 1 club CR Belouizdad.

He began his football career by joining the Paradou AC training center. In 2017, he joined the first team and made his professional debut. He finished as the second goalscorer in 2021–22 with 14 goals. In July 2022, he signed for Raja Club Athletic where he won the domestic double in 2023–24, finishing the league's with the most goals scored and the most assists made.

== Career ==
Yousri Bouzok was born in Constantine, Algeria. He made his Algerian Ligue Professionnelle 1 debut on 7 September 2017, as a starter with Paradou AC in a 1–0 win against MC Oran.

On 31 July 2022, he signed a three-season contract with Raja CA and became the fourth Algerian player of the club's squad with Gaya Merbah, Raouf Benguit and Mehdi Boukassi.

On 28 December, he scored his first hat-trick against Ittihad Tanger in Botola (6–1 win).

On 14 January 2025, Bouzok joined Saudi Arabian club Al-Raed on a free transfer.

On 7 July 2026, he joined CR Belouizdad.

== Honours ==
Raja CA

- Botola Pro: 2023–24
- Moroccan Throne Cup: 2022–23

Paradou

- Ligue Professionnelle 2: 2016–17

Individual

- Botola Pro Top scorer: 2023–24 (14 goals)
- Botola Pro Top assists provider: 2023–24
- Botola Pro Best Foreign Player of the Season: 2023–24
