= Hamza Mouali =

Algerian footballer (born 1998)

Personal information
- Date of birth: January 16, 1998 (age 28)
- Place of birth: El Mouradia, Algeria
- Height: 1.77 m (5 ft 10 in)
- Position: Left-back

Team information
- Current team: Olympique Akbou
- Number: 14

Youth career
- JMG Academy
- –2017: Paradou AC

Senior career*
Years	Team	Apps	(Gls)
2017–2023	Paradou AC	125	(9)
2022–2023	→ Laval (loan)	6	(0)
2022	→ Laval B (loan)	1	(0)
2023–2025	MC Alger	43	(0)
2025–2026	JS Kabylie	5	(0)
2026	→ JS Saoura (loan)	13	(0)
2026-	Olympique Akbou	0	(0)

International career^{‡}
2016	Algeria U20	2	(0)
2017–2019	Algeria U23	5	(0)
2021–	Algeria A'	1	(0)
- * Club domestic league appearances and goals as of 14 July 2026 ‡ National team caps and goals as of 8 August 2022

Hamza Mouali (Arabic: حمزة موالي; Tamazight: ⵀⴰⵎⵣⴰ ⵎⵓⴰⵍⵉ; born January 16, 1998) is an Algerian professional footballer who plays as a left-back for Olympique Akbou.

== Career ==
Mouali made his senior debut with Paradou AC on August 26, 2017, as a starter in a 2–1 loss to USM Algiers. In August 2022, he was loaned from Paradou to Stade Lavallois. In January 2023 he joined MC Alger. In August 2025, he signed a two-year contract with JS Kabylie. On 27 January 2026, he signed a loan contract with JS Saoura. On 14 July 2026, he joined Olympique Akbou.
