= 2021–22 Paradou AC season =

Paradou AC
2021–22 season
- President: Hacène Zetchi
- Head coach: Tahar Chérif El-Ouazzani (until 17 February 2022); Moulay Azzeggourah (c) (from 18 February 2022) (until 20 March 2022); Boško Gjurovski (from 21 March 2022) (until 9 May 2022); Francisco Chaló (from 10 May 2022)
- Stadium: Omar Benrabah Stadium
- Ligue 1: 6th
- Top goalscorer: League: Ahmed Nadhir Benbouali; Yousri Bouzok (14 goals); All: Ahmed Nadhir Benbouali; Yousri Bouzok (14 goals)
- Biggest win: 6–2 vs HB Chelghoum Laïd (H) (25 January 2022)
- Biggest defeat: 1–4 vs JS Saoura (A) (16 January 2022)

In the 2021–22 season, Paradou AC is competing in the Ligue 1 for the 7th season. It is their 5th consecutive season in the top flight of Algerian football. They competing in Ligue 1.

== Squad list ==
Players and squad numbers last updated on 20 October 2021.
Note: Flags indicate national team as has been defined under FIFA eligibility rules. Players may hold more than one non-FIFA nationality.

| No. | Nat. | Position | Name | Date of Birth (Age) | Signed from |
Goalkeepers
| 1 | (Algeria) | GK | Abderrahmane Medjadel | 1 July 1998 (aged 23) | (Algeria) Olympique de Médéa |
| 14 | (Algeria) | GK | Kheireddine Boussouf | 7 December 1987 (aged 34) | (Algeria) AS Ain M'lila |
Defenders
| 2 | (Algeria) | RB | Mohamed Réda Hamidi | 8 June 2001 (aged 20) | (Algeria) Youth system |
| 5 | (Algeria) | CB | Youcef Douar | 15 September 1997 (aged 24) | (Algeria) Youth system |
| 6 | (Algeria) | CB | Hocine Dehiri | 16 September 2000 (aged 21) | (Algeria) Youth system |
| 20 | (Algeria) | LB | Hamza Mouali | 16 January 1998 (aged 23) | (Algeria) Youth system |
| 21 | (Algeria) | LB | Chaouki Benleguemari | 12 April 2000 (aged 21) | (Algeria) Youth system |
| 22 | (Algeria) | CB | Tarek Bouabta | 21 July 1991 (aged 30) | (Algeria) JSM Bejaia |
| 24 | (Algeria) | CB | Islem Chebbour | 22 March 1996 (aged 25) | (Algeria) HB Chelghoum Laïd |
| 25 | (Algeria) | RB | Aimen Bouguerra | 10 January 1997 (aged 24) | (Algeria) Youth system |
Midfielders
| 3 | (Algeria) | MF | Nour El Islam Melikchi | 23 July 1996 (aged 25) | (Algeria) CA Bordj Bou Arreridj |
| 4 | (Algeria) | MF | Tayeb Hamoudi | 10 February 1995 (aged 26) | (Algeria) US Biskra |
| 8 | (Uganda) | MF | Allan Okello | 4 July 2000 (aged 21) | (Uganda) Kampala Capital City |
| 9 | (Algeria) | MF | Houcine Aoued | 21 April 1999 (aged 21) | (Algeria) RC Relizane |
| 16 | (Algeria) | MF | Yassine Beldjilali | 22 January 2000 (aged 21) | (Algeria) Youth system |
| 18 | (Algeria) | MF | Abdeldjalil Tahri | 15 October 1998 (aged 23) | (Algeria) Youth system |
Forwards
| 7 | (Algeria) | FW | Zerroug Boucif | 20 September 2000 (aged 21) | (Algeria) Youth system |
| 11 | (Algeria) | FW | Ghiles Guenaoui | 2 August 1998 (aged 23) | (Algeria) Youth system |
| 12 | (Algeria) | FW | Hicham Messiad | 21 April 1999 (aged 22) | (Algeria) Youth system |
| 13 | (Algeria) | FW | Ahmed Nadhir Benbouali | 17 April 2000 (aged 21) | (Algeria) Youth system |
| 19 | (Algeria) | FW | Merouane Zerrouki | 25 January 2001 (aged 20) | (Algeria) Youth system |
| 23 | (Algeria) | FW | Adem Redjem | 1 January 1997 (aged 25) | (Algeria) CS Constantine |
| 26 | (Algeria) | FW | Yousri Bouzok | 18 August 1996 (aged 25) | (Algeria) Youth system |
| 27 | (Algeria) | FW | Djaber Kaassis | 3 May 1999 (aged 22) | (Algeria) Youth system |

== Competitions ==
=== Overview ===
| Competition | Record | | | | | | | | Started round | Final position / round | First match | Last match |
| Competition | G | W | D | L | GF | GA | GD | Win % | Started round | Final position / round | First match | Last match |
|---|---|---|---|---|---|---|---|---|---|---|---|---|
| Ligue 1 | 34 | 16 | 6 | 12 | 43 | 36 | +7 | 47.06 | —N/a | 6th | 23 October 2021 | 11 June 2022 |
| Total | 34 | 16 | 6 | 12 | 43 | 36 | +7 | 47.06 | | | | |

Updated to match played 11 June 2022
Source: Competitions

== League table ==
| Pos | Team | Pld | W | D | L | GF | GA | GD | Pts | Qualification or relegation |
|---|---|---|---|---|---|---|---|---|---|---|
| 4 | USM Alger | 34 | 15 | 12 | 7 | 45 | 22 | +23 | 57 | Qualification for CAF Confederation Cup |
| 5 | CS Constantine | 34 | 15 | 10 | 9 | 46 | 29 | +17 | 55 | |
| 6 | Paradou AC | 34 | 16 | 6 | 12 | 43 | 36 | +7 | 54 (Note: Paradou AC finished ahead of ES Sétif on head-to-head points: Paradou AC 1–0 ES Sétif, ES Sétif 0–1 Paradou AC.) | |
| 7 | ES Sétif | 34 | 15 | 9 | 10 | 43 | 24 | +19 | 54 | |
| 8 | MC Alger | 34 | 13 | 12 | 9 | 36 | 24 | +12 | 51 | |

Updated to match(es) played on 17 June 2022. Source: the-sports.org
Rules for classification: 1) points; 2) head-to-head points; 3) head-to-head goal difference; 4) goal difference; 5) total goals; 6) fairplay ranking; 7) playoff.

=== Results summary ===
| Overall | | | | | | | | Home | | | | | | Away | | | | | |
| Pld | W | D | L | GF | GA | GD | Pts | W | D | L | GF | GA | GD | W | D | L | GF | GA | GD |
|---|---|---|---|---|---|---|---|---|---|---|---|---|---|---|---|---|---|---|---|
| 34 | 16 | 6 | 12 | 43 | 36 | +7 | 54 | 9 | 5 | 3 | 24 | 13 | +11 | 7 | 1 | 9 | 19 | 23 | −4 |

Last updated: 11 June 2022.
Source: Competitive matches

=== Results by round ===
| Round | 1 | 2 | 3 | 4 | 5 | 6 | 7 | 8 | 9 | 10 | 11 | 12 | 13 | 14 | 15 | 16 | 17 | 18 | 19 | 20 | 21 | 22 | 23 | 24 | 25 | 26 | 27 | 28 | 29 | 30 | 31 | 32 | 33 | 34 |
|---|---|---|---|---|---|---|---|---|---|---|---|---|---|---|---|---|---|---|---|---|---|---|---|---|---|---|---|---|---|---|---|---|---|---|
| Ground | H | A | H | A | H | A | H | A | A | H | A | H | A | H | A | H | A | A | H | A | H | A | H | A | H | H | A | H | A | H | A | H | A | H |
| Result | W | W | L | W | W | L | D | W | W | W | W | L | L | W | L | W | L | D | D | L | W | W | D | L | W | W | W | D | L | W | L | L | L | D |
| Position | 6 | 2 | 5 | 2 | 2 | 3 | 6 | 3 | 2 | 2 | 1 | 1 | 2 | 2 | 4 | 3 | 3 | 4 | 4 | 7 | 5 | 5 | 5 | 6 | 4 | 3 | 3 | 3 | 4 | 3 | 4 | 5 | 5 | 6 |

Updated to match(es) played on 11 June 2022. Source: Competitive matches
A = Away; H = Home; W = Win; D = Draw; L = Loss

=== Matches ===
The league fixtures were announced on 7 October 2021.

| 23 October 2021 Round 1 | Paradou AC | 1–0 | ASO Chlef | Dar El Beïda |
| 16:00 | Benbouali 43' | Report | | Stadium: Omar Benrabah Stadium; Attendance: 0 (Note: The match was played behind closed doors due to the COVID-19 pandemic in Algeria.); Referee: Mohamed Boutaraa |

| 30 October 2021 Round 2 | MC Oran | 2–4 | Paradou AC | Oran |
| 15:00 | Chadli 66'; Djabout 90+2' | Report | Benbouali 37', 73'; Bouzok 51' (pen.), 56' | Stadium: Ahmed Zabana Stadium; Referee: Houssam Benyahia |

| 7 November 2021 Round 3 | Paradou AC | 1–3 | CR Belouizdad | Dar El Beïda |
| 15:00 | Benbouali 80' | Report | Bousseliou 27'; Hamad 60'; Ait Abdessalem 70' | Stadium: Omar Benrabah Stadium; Referee: Malek Ait Ameur |

| 20 November 2021 Round 4 | NC Magra | 1–3 | Paradou AC | Magra |
| 14:30 | Belhamri 17' | Report | Titraoui 3'; Okello 59'; Benbouali 69' | Stadium: Boucheligue Brothers Stadium; Referee: Youcef Gamouh |

| 25 November 2021 Round 5 | Paradou AC | 1–0 | WA Tlemcen | Dar El Beïda |
| 14:30 | Bouzok 71' (pen.) | Report | | Stadium: Omar Benrabah Stadium; Referee: Mohamad Salah Dafri |

| 24 December 2021 Round 9 | Olympique de Médéa | 0–1 | Paradou AC | Médéa |
| 15:00 | | Report | Bouzok 81' | Stadium: Stade Imam Lyes; Referee: Ali Nader |

| 28 December 2021 Round 10 | Paradou AC | 1–0 | ES Sétif | Dar El Beïda |
| 14:30 | Mouali 51' | Report | | Stadium: Omar Benrabah Stadium; Attendance: 0 (close doors); Referee: Youcef Taieb Bouderbal |

| 2 January 2022 Round 11 | NA Hussein Dey | 0–2 | Paradou AC | Belouizdad |
| 14:00 | | Report | Benbouali 90'; Boucif 90+6' | Stadium: Stade 20 Août 1955; Attendance: 0 (close doors); Referee: Abdelmoumen Touabti |

| 7 January 2022 Round 12 | Paradou AC | 1–2 | RC Arbaâ | Dar El Beïda |
| 15:00 | Benbouali 1' | Report | Frifer 56'; Kessili 90+3' | Stadium: Omar Benrabah Stadium; Attendance: 0 (close doors); Referee: Ahmed Benhamou |

| 11 January 2022 Round 6 | MC Alger | 1–0 | Paradou AC | Algiers |
| 18:00 | Frioui 85' | Report | | Stadium: Stade du 5 Juillet; Attendance: 0 (close doors); Referee: Malek Ait Ameur |

| 16 January 2022 Round 13 | JS Saoura | 4–1 | Paradou AC | Béchar |
| 16:00 | Bellatreche 45+2'; Saadi 48'; Lahmeri 83' (pen.); Ben Yezli 90+2' | Report | Bouzok 17' | Stadium: 20 August 1955 Stadium; Referee: Mohamed Saïdi |

| 21 January 2022 Round 14 | Paradou AC | 1–0 | US Biskra | Dar El Beïda |
| 15:00 | Bouzok 64' | Report | | Stadium: Omar Benrabah Stadium; Referee: Houssam Benyahia |

| 25 January 2022 Round 15 | USM Alger | 2–1 | Paradou AC | Bologhine |
| 14:30 | Belkacemi 24', 33'; Merbah (yellow card) 39' (yellow-red card) 74' | Report | Bouzok 45+1'; Kaassis (yellow card) 78' | Stadium: Omar Hamadi Stadium; Attendance: 0 (close doors); Referee: Mohamed Bouteraa |

| 25 January 2022 Round 16 | Paradou AC | 6–2 | HB Chelghoum Laïd | Dar El Beïda |
| 18:00 | Benbouali 8'; Titraoui 21'; Boulbina 45+1'; Bouzok 46'; Mouali 68'; Zerrouki 82' | Report | Kemoukh 8'; Aïb 90+3' | Stadium: Omar Benrabah Stadium; Referee: Bilel Soltani |

| 3 February 2022 Round 7 | Paradou AC | 1–1 | CS Constantine | Dar El Beïda |
| 14:30 | Benbouali 41' | Report | Koukpo 24' | Stadium: Omar Benrabah Stadium; Referee: Abdellah Benchehida |

| 9 February 2022 Round 8 | RC Relizane | 0–2 | Paradou AC | Relizane |
| 15:00 | | Report | Zerrouki 21', 37' | Stadium: Tahar Zoughari Stadium; Referee: Mohamed Tahar Milia |

| 14 February 2022 Round 17 | JS Kabylie | 2–0 | Paradou AC | Tizi Ouzou |
| 17:30 | Bensayah 17'; Mouaki 47' | Report | | Stadium: 1 November 1954 Stadium; Referee: Lahlou Benbraham |

| 25 February 2022 Round 18 | ASO Chlef | 0–0 | Paradou AC | Chlef |
| 17:00 | | Report | | Stadium: Mohamed Boumezrag Stadium; Referee: Abdelmoumen Touabti |

| 1 March 2022 Round 19 | Paradou AC | 0–0 | MC Oran | Dar El Beïda |
| 14:30 | | Report | | Stadium: Omar Benrabah Stadium; Attendance: 0 (close doors); Referee: Abdelali Ibrir |

| 7 March 2022 Round 20 | CR Belouizdad | 2–0 | Paradou AC | Belouizdad |
| 14:30 | Bouguerra 80' (o.g.); Merzougui 90+1' | Report | | Stadium: 20 August 1955 Stadium; Attendance: 0 (close doors); Referee: Houssam Benyahia |

| 13 March 2022 Round 21 | Paradou AC | 3–1 | NC Magra | Dar El Beïda |
| 14:30 | Bouzok 21', 48'; Benbouali 69' | Report | Ghanem 39' (pen.) | Stadium: Omar Benrabah Stadium; Referee: Bilal Bendjahene |

| 19 March 2022 Round 22 | WA Tlemcen | 1–3 | Paradou AC | Tlemcen |
| 15:00 | Talbi 90+4' | Report | Bouzok 42'; Benbouali 45+1' (pen.); Boulbina 85' | Stadium: Colonel Lotfi Stadium; Referee: Ahmed Benhamou |

| 28 March 2022 Round 23 | Paradou AC | 1–1 | MC Alger | Dar El Beïda |
| 16:00 | Bouzok 52' | Report | Frioui 77' (pen.) | Stadium: Omar Benrabah Stadium; Attendance: 0 (close doors); Referee: Bilel Soltani |

| 1 April 2022 Round 24 | CS Constantine | 1–0 | Paradou AC | Constantine |
| 16:00 | Ardji 77' | Report | | Stadium: Ramadane Ben Abdelmalek Stadium; Referee: Said Aouina |

| 12 April 2022 Round 25 | Paradou AC | 3–0 | RC Relizane | Bologhine |
| 22:00 | Benbouali 34', 70'; Bouzok 74' | Report | | Stadium: Omar Hamadi Stadium; Referee: Hadj Aissa Semache |

| 16 April 2022 Round 26 | Paradou AC | 2–1 | Olympique de Médéa | Bologhine |
| 22:30 | Nehari 31' (o.g.); Boulbina 90+1' | Report | Bellaouel 11' | Stadium: Omar Hamadi Stadium; Attendance: 0 (close doors); Referee: Abdellah Benchehida |

| 29 April 2022 Round 28 | Paradou AC | 1–1 | NA Hussein Dey | Bologhine |
| 22:30 | Benbouali 73' | Report | Akziz 90' | Stadium: Omar Hamadi Stadium; Attendance: 0 (close doors); Referee: Massinissa Merakchi |

| 6 May 2022 Round 29 | RC Arbaâ | 3–1 | Paradou AC | Larbaâ |
| 16:00 | Oukil 10', 73', 79' | Report | Bouzok 25' (pen.) | Stadium: Ismaïl Makhlouf Stadium; Referee: Malek Aït Ameur |

| 13 May 2022 Round 30 | Paradou A | 1–0 | JS Saoura | Dar El Beïda |
| 16:00 | Akacem 52' (o.g.) | Report | | Stadium: Omar Benrabah Stadium; Attendance: 0 (close doors); Referee: Akram Mechairia |

| 20 May 2022 Round 31 | US Biskra | 1–0 | Paradou AC | Biskra |
| 17:00 | Adouane 21' | Report | | Stadium: 18 February Stadium; Referee: Mohamed Saïdi |

| 27 May 2022 Round 32 | Paradou AC | 0–1 | USM Alger | Dar El Beïda |
| 16:45 | | Report | Belaïd 51' | Stadium: Omar Benrabah Stadium; Attendance: 0 (close doors); Referee: Youcef Gamouh |

| 3 June 2022 Round 33 | HB Chelghoum Laïd | 3–0 | Paradou AC | Chelghoum Laïd |
| 16:45 | Demane 29'; Boukebal 59' (o.g.); Belkacemi 82' | Report | | Stadium: 11 December 1961 Stadium; Referee: Mohamed Ali Nader |

| 8 June 2022 Round 27 | ES Sétif | 0–1 | Paradou AC | Sétif |
| 18:45 | | Report | Boukerma 77' | Stadium: 8 May 1945 Stadium; Referee: Mohamed Saïdi |

| 11 June 2022 Round 34 | Paradou AC | 0–0 | JS Kabylie | Dar El Beïda |
| 16:45 | | Report | | Stadium: Omar Benrabah Stadium; Referee: Nadjib Meziani |

== Squad information ==
=== Playing statistics ===
| No. | Pos | Nat | Player | Total | | Ligue 1 | |
| No. | Pos | Nat | Player | Apps | Goals | Apps | Goals |
|---|---|---|---|---|---|---|---|
| 1 | GK | (Algeria) ALG | Abderrahmane Medjadel | 17 | 0 | 17 | 0 |
| 14 | GK | (Algeria) ALG | Kheireddine Boussouf | 14 | 0 | 14 | 0 |
| 31 | GK | (Algeria) ALG | Tarek Bousseder | 1 | 0 | 1 | 0 |
| 55 | GK | (Algeria) ALG | Mohamed Hady Sahnoun | 3 | 0 | 3 | 0 |
| 2 | DF | (Algeria) ALG | Mohamed Réda Hamidi | 13 | 0 | 13 | 0 |
| 5 | DF | (Algeria) ALG | Youcef Douar | 32 | 0 | 32 | 0 |
| 6 | DF | (Algeria) ALG | Hocine Dehiri | 24 | 0 | 24 | 0 |
| 20 | DF | (Algeria) ALG | Hamza Mouali | 24 | 2 | 24 | 2 |
| 21 | DF | (Algeria) ALG | Chaouki Benleguemari | 0 | 0 | 0 | 0 |
| 24 | DF | (Algeria) ALG | Islem Chebbour | 7 | 0 | 7 | 0 |
| 25 | DF | (Algeria) ALG | Aimen Bouguerra | 27 | 0 | 27 | 0 |
| 33 | DF | (Algeria) ALG | Chouaib Boulkaboul | 3 | 0 | 3 | 0 |
| 34 | DF | (Algeria) ALG | Mohamed Ayoub Zendaoui | 2 | 0 | 2 | 0 |
| 35 | DF | (Algeria) ALG | Abdeldjalil Mancer | 4 | 0 | 4 | 0 |
| 3 | MF | (Algeria) ALG | Nour El Islam Melikchi | 3 | 0 | 3 | 0 |
| 4 | MF | (Algeria) ALG | Tayeb Hamoudi | 20 | 0 | 20 | 0 |
| 8 | MF | (Algeria) ALG | Allan Okello | 16 | 1 | 16 | 1 |
| 9 | MF | (Algeria) ALG | Houcine Aoued | 10 | 0 | 10 | 0 |
| 16 | MF | (Algeria) ALG | Yassine Beldjilali | 2 | 0 | 2 | 0 |
| 18 | MF | (Algeria) ALG | Abdeldjalil Tahri | 13 | 0 | 13 | 0 |
| 39 | MF | (Algeria) ALG | Mohamed Boukerma | 3 | 1 | 3 | 1 |
| 43 | MF | (Algeria) ALG | Miloud Abdessalem Dadda | 3 | 0 | 3 | 0 |
| 51 | MF | (Algeria) ALG | Zakaria Boukebal | 3 | 0 | 3 | 0 |
| 52 | MF | (Algeria) ALG | Abdelhek Belmaziz | 6 | 0 | 6 | 0 |
| 57 | MF | (Algeria) ALG | Ayoub Derbal | 1 | 0 | 1 | 0 |
| 78 | MF | (Algeria) ALG | Yassine Titraoui | 28 | 2 | 28 | 2 |
| 7 | FW | (Algeria) ALG | Zerroug Boucif | 9 | 1 | 9 | 1 |
| 11 | FW | (Algeria) ALG | Ghiles Guenaoui | 16 | 1 | 16 | 1 |
| 12 | FW | (Algeria) ALG | Hicham Messiad | 19 | 0 | 19 | 0 |
| 13 | FW | (Algeria) ALG | Ahmed Nadhir Benbouali | 29 | 14 | 29 | 14 |
| 19 | FW | (Algeria) ALG | Merouane Zerrouki | 20 | 3 | 20 | 3 |
| 23 | FW | (Algeria) ALG | Adem Redjem | 10 | 0 | 10 | 0 |
| 26 | FW | (Algeria) ALG | Yousri Bouzok | 29 | 14 | 29 | 14 |
| 27 | FW | (Algeria) ALG | Djaber Kaassis | 26 | 0 | 26 | 0 |
| 38 | FW | (Algeria) ALG | Aymen Zakarya Sais | 1 | 0 | 1 | 0 |
| 55 | FW | (Algeria) ALG | Riad Wael Rahmoun | 1 | 0 | 1 | 0 |
| 77 | FW | (Algeria) ALG | Adil Boulbina | 26 | 3 | 26 | 3 |
Players transferred out during the season
| 22 | DF | (Algeria) ALG | Tarek Bouabta | 7 | 0 | 7 | 0 |

Last updated: 11 June 2022
Source: soccerway.com

=== Goalscorers ===
Includes all competitive matches. The list is sorted alphabetically by surname when total goals are equal.

| No. | Nat. | Player | Pos. | L 1 | TOTAL |
|---|---|---|---|---|---|
| 13 | (Algeria) | Ahmed Nadhir Benbouali | FW | 14 | 14 |
| 26 | (Algeria) | Yousri Bouzok | FW | 14 | 14 |
| 19 | (Algeria) | Merouane Zerrouki | FW | 3 | 3 |
| 77 | (Algeria) | Adil Boulbina | FW | 3 | 3 |
| 78 | (Algeria) | Yassine Titraoui | MF | 2 | 2 |
| 20 | (Algeria) | Hamza Mouali | DF | 2 | 2 |
| 8 | (Algeria) | Allan Okello | MF | 1 | 1 |
| 7 | (Algeria) | Zerroug Boucif | FW | 1 | 1 |
| 11 | (Algeria) | Ghiles Guenaoui | FW | 1 | 1 |
| 39 | (Algeria) | Mohamed Boukerma | MF | 1 | 1 |
| Own Goals | | | | 1 | 1 |
| Totals | | | | 43 | 43 |

== Transfers ==
=== In ===
| Date | Pos | Player | From club | Transfer fee | Source |
|---|---|---|---|---|---|
| 25 August 2021 | ST | (Algeria) Zakaria Naidji | USM Alger | Loan Return | |
| 9 September 2021 | GK | (Algeria) Abderrahmane Medjadel | Olympique de Médéa | Undisclosed | |
| 23 September 2021 | FW | (Algeria) Houcine Aoued | RC Relizane | Free Transfer | |

=== Out ===
| Date | Pos | Player | To club | Transfer fee | Source |
|---|---|---|---|---|---|
| 26 June 2021 | CM | (Algeria) Adem Zorgane | (Belgium) Charleroi | 1,000,000 € | |
| 11 August 2021 | CM | (Algeria) Abdelkahar Kadri | (Belgium) Kortrijk | 500,000 € | |
| 24 August 2021 | MF | (Algeria) Riad Benayad | ES Sétif | Loan | |
| 31 August 2021 | DM | (Algeria) Zakaria Messibah | CS Constantine | Loan | |
| 31 August 2021 | ST | (Algeria) Zakaria Naidji | (France) Pau FC | Loan | |
| 16 September 2021 | GK | (Algeria) Omar Hadji | JS Saoura | Free transfer | |
| 21 September 2021 | LB | (Algeria) Juba Chirani | WA Tlemcen | Free transfer | |
| 29 September 2021 | LB | (Algeria) Abdelhak Elardja | US Biskra | Free transfer | |
| 5 October 2021 | FW | (Algeria) Mohamed Fenniri | US Biskra | Loan | |
| 12 October 2021 | ST | (Algeria) Abderrezak Kibboua | NC Magra | Loan | |
| 15 October 2021 | RB | (Algeria) Kheir Eddine Ali Haïmoud | NA Hussein Dey | Loan | |
| 20 October 2021 | FW | (Algeria) Oussama Kismoun | RC Arbaâ | Free transfer | |
