= 2023–24 Paradou AC season =

Paradou AC
2023–24 season
- President: Hacène Zetchi
- Head coach: Nadhir Leknaoui (until 13 September 2023); Corentin Martins (from 15 September 2023) (until 31 March 2024); Abdelkarim Saber Cherif (from 31 March 2024)
- Stadium: Omar Benrabah Stadium
- Ligue 1: 6th
- Algerian Cup: Round of 32
- Top goalscorer: League: Adil Boulbina (9 goals); All: Adil Boulbina (10 goals)
- Biggest win: Paradou AC 6–0 US Souf
- Biggest defeat: MC Oran 2–0 Paradou AC
Home colours	Away colours	Third colours

The 2023–24 season, is Paradou AC's 9th season and the club's 7th consecutive season in the top flight of Algerian football. In addition to the domestic league, Paradou AC are participating in the Algerian Cup.

== Squad list ==
Players and squad numbers last updated on 5 February 2024.
Note: Flags indicate national team as has been defined under FIFA eligibility rules. Players may hold more than one non-FIFA nationality.

No.	Nat.	Position	Name	Date of Birth (Age)	Signed from
Goalkeepers
1	(Algeria)	GK	Mohamed Hady Sahnoun	5 January 2002 (aged 21)	(Algeria) Youth system
16	(Algeria)	GK	Mokhtar Ferrahi	24 January 1996 (aged 27)	(Algeria) ES Sétif
23	(Algeria)	GK	Toufik Moussaoui	20 April 1991 (aged 32)	(Morocco) OC Khouribga
Defenders
2	(Algeria)	RB	Mohamed Réda Hamidi	8 June 2001 (aged 22)	(Algeria) Youth system
4	(Algeria)	CB	Idir Mokeddem	5 June 1994 (aged 29)	(Algeria) JS Saoura
5	(Algeria)	CB	Youcef Douar	15 September 1997 (aged 26)	(Algeria) Youth system
6	(Algeria)	CB	Ahmed Ait Abdessalem	30 August 1997 (aged 26)	(Algeria) CR Belouizdad
15	(Algeria)	LB	Chouaib Boulkaboul	3 April 2001 (aged 22)	(Algeria) Youth system
22	(Algeria)	LB	Abdellah Bendouma	7 October 2001 (aged 21)	(Algeria) USM Bel Abbès
24	(Algeria)	CB	Sid Ali Kherbouche	9 April 2000 (aged 23)	(Algeria) Youth system
25	(Algeria)	RB	Fouad Kermiche	11 July 1999 (aged 24)	(Algeria) CR Témouchent
Midfielders
3	(Algeria)	MF	Zakaria Boukebal	9 January 2002 (aged 21)	(Algeria) Youth system
8	(Republic of the Congo)	MF	Gosim Elenga	23 June 2001 (aged 22)	(Republic of the Congo) CSMD Diables Noirs
9	(Algeria)	MF	Abdelhek Belmaziz	12 July 2001 (aged 22)	(Algeria) Youth system
10	(Algeria)	MF	Mohamed Boukerma	5 August 2001 (aged 22)	(Algeria) Youth system
18	(Algeria)	MF	Abdeldjalil Tahri	15 October 1998 (aged 24)	(Algeria) Youth system
20	(Algeria)	MF	Abderrahmane Berkoun	13 March 2000 (aged 23)	(Algeria) RC Arbaâ
26	(Algeria)	MF	Taha Yassine Tahar	23 September 2000 (aged 22)	(Algeria) RC Relizane
78	(Algeria)	MF	Yassine Titraoui	26 July 2003 (aged 20)	(Algeria) Youth system
Forwards
12	(Algeria)	FW	Hicham Messiad	21 April 1999 (aged 24)	(Algeria) Youth system
14	(Algeria)	FW	Zerroug Boucif	20 September 2000 (aged 22)	(Algeria) ES Sétif
19	(Republic of the Congo)	FW	Christ Toulouenga	24 May 2005 (aged 18)	(Republic of the Congo) CSMD Diables Noirs
21	(Algeria)	FW	Aymen Sais	12 March 2001 (aged 22)	(Algeria) Youth system
27	(Algeria)	FW	Djaber Kaassis	3 May 1999 (aged 24)	(Algeria) Youth system
77	(Algeria)	FW	Adil Boulbina	2 May 2003 (aged 20)	(Algeria) Youth system

== Transfers ==
=== In ===
==== Summer ====
Date	Pos	Player	Moving from	Fee	Source
21 July 2023	CB	(Algeria) Ahmed Ait Abdesslem	CR Belouizdad	Free transfer	
29 July 2023	RB	(Algeria) Fouad Kermiche	CR Témouchent	Free transfer	

=== Out ===
==== Summer ====
Date	Pos	Player	Moving to	Fee	Source
20 July 2023	CB	(Algeria) Hocine Dehiri	USM Alger	Free transfer	
9 August 2023	FW	(Algeria) Merouane Zerrouki	CR Belouizdad	Free transfer	
28 August 2023	DF	(Algeria) Kheir Eddine Ali Haïmoud	CA Batna	Free transfer	
30 August 2023	DF	(Algeria) Yassine Beldjilali	CA Batna	Free transfer	

==== Summer ====
Date	Pos	Player	Moving to	Fee	Source
25 January 2024	FW	(Algeria) Adel Belkacem Bouzida	USM Alger	Loan	

=== New contracts ===
No.	Pos	Player	Contract length	Contract end	Date	Source
23	GK	Toufik Moussaoui	2 years	2027	3 August 2023	

== Competitions ==
=== Overview ===
Competition	Record								Started round	Final position / round	First match	Last match
Competition	G	W	D	L	GF	GA	GD	Win %	Started round	Final position / round	First match	Last match
Ligue 1	30	11	9	10	36	22	+14	36.67	—N/a	6th	22 September 2023	14 June 2024
Algerian Cup	2	1	0	1	2	2	+0	50.00	Round of 64	Round of 32	2 February 2024	8 March 2024
Total	32	12	9	11	38	24	+14	37.50				

Updated to match played 14 June 2024
Source: Competitions

=== Ligue 1 ===
==== League table ====
Pos	Team	Pld	W	D	L	GF	GA	GD	Pts	Qualification or relegation
4	USM Alger	30	15	4	11	40	32	+8	49	Qualification for CAF Confederation Cup
5	ES Sétif	30	14	6	10	37	37	0	48	
6	Paradou AC	30	11	9	10	36	22	+14	42	
7	JS Kabylie	30	10	12	8	33	27	+6	42	
8	ASO Chlef	30	11	8	11	41	40	+1	41	

Source: the-sports.org
Rules for classification: 1) points; 2) head-to-head points; 3) head-to-head goal difference; 4) goal difference; 5) total goals; 6) fairplay ranking; 7) playoff.

==== Results summary ====
Overall								Home						Away					
Pld	W	D	L	GF	GA	GD	Pts	W	D	L	GF	GA	GD	W	D	L	GF	GA	GD
30	11	9	10	36	22	+14	42	6	6	3	14	5	+9	5	3	7	22	17	+5

Last updated: 14 June 2024.
Source: Competitive matches

==== Results by round ====
Round	1	2	3	4	5	6	7	8	9	10	11	12	13	14	15	16	17	18	19	20	21	22	23	24	25	26	27	28	29	30
Ground	H	A	H	A	H	A	H	A	H	A	H	A	H	H	A	A	H	A	H	A	H	A	H	A	H	A	H	A	A	H
Result	W	D	L	W	W	W	D	L	L	D	D	W	D	W	W	W	D	D	D	L	D	L	W	L	L	L	W	L	L	W
Position	7	5	8	4	2	2	3	3	5	5	6	5	6	4	3	3	3	3	3	6	6	6	5	6	6	6	6	6	7	6

Updated to match(es) played on 14 June 2024. Source: Competitive matches
A = Away; H = Home; W = Win; D = Draw; L = Loss

==== Matches ====
The league fixtures were announced on 24 August 2023.

All times are local, WAT (UTC+1).

Win Draw Loss Postponed

22 September 2023 Round 2	JS Kabylie	0–0	Paradou AC	Tizi Ouzou
19:00		Report		Stadium: 1 November 1954 Stadium; Referee: Abdellah Benchehida

27 September 2023 Round 1	Paradou AC	1–0	USM Alger	Dar El Beïda
16:00	Kohili 90+3'	Report		Stadium: Omar Benrabah Stadium; Referee: Mohamed Bouteraa

6 October 2023 Round 4	US Biskra	0–5	Paradou AC	Biskra
19:00		Report	Ait Abdessalem 7'; Titraoui 11', 60'; Bouzida 38'; Kohili 86'	Stadium: 18 February Stadium; Referee: Mustapha Ghorbal

10 November 2023 Round 5	Paradou AC	1–0	MC Oran	Dar El Beïda
15:30	Kohili 15'	Report		Stadium: Omar Benrabah Stadium; Attendance: 0 (close doors); Referee: Rafik Aouina

14 November 2023 Round 3	Paradou AC	0–1	CR Belouizdad	Dar El Beïda
15:00		Report	Wamba 43'	Stadium: Omar Benrabah Stadium; Attendance: 0 (close doors); Referee: Hamza Bouslimani

18 November 2023 Round 6	ES Ben Aknoun	0–1	Paradou AC	Belouizdad
15:00		Report	Titraoui 79'	Stadium: 20 August 1955 Stadium; Referee: Abdelali Ibrir

24 November 2023 Round 7	Paradou AC	0–0	CS Constantine	Dar El Beïda
15:15		Report		Stadium: Omar Benrabah Stadium; Referee: Nabil Boukhalfa

1 December 2023 Round 8	MC El Bayadh	1–0	Paradou AC	El Bayadh
15:15	Belmiloud 90' (pen.)	Report		Stadium: Zakaria Medjdoub Stadium; Referee: Yahia Dahar

7 December 2023 Round 9	Paradou AC	0–1	MC Alger	Algiers
19:00		Report	Abdellaoui 54'	Stadium: Stade du 5 Juillet; Referee: Lahlou Benbraham

15 December 2023 Round 10	ASO Chlef	1–1	Paradou AC	Chlef
18:00	Aguieb 71'	Report	Boulbina 78'	Stadium: Mohamed Boumezrag Stadium; Referee: Mustapha Ghorbal

29 December 2023 Round 11	Paradou AC	0–0	JS Saoura	Dar El Beïda
15:15		Report		Stadium: Omar Benrabah Stadium; Referee: Akram Mechairia

5 January 2024 Round 12	US Souf	1–4	Paradou AC	El Oued
15:15	Siab 51' (pen.)	Report	Titraoui 14'; Tahar 24'; Chacha 64' (o.g.); Ramdaoui 68'	Stadium: 1 November 1954 Stadium; Referee: Abderrahmane Sahraoui

12 January 2024 Round 13	Paradou AC	0–0	NC Magra	Dar El Beïda
15:15		Report		Stadium: Omar Benrabah Stadium; Referee: Alaa Bouab

19 January 2024 Round 14	Paradou AC	1–0	ES Sétif	Dar El Beïda
15:30	Titraoui 49'	Report		Stadium: Omar Benrabah Stadium; Referee: Abdelali Ibrir

26 January 2024 Round 15	USM Khenchela	1–2	Paradou AC	Khenchela
15:30	Baakoh 29' (pen.)	Report	Titraoui 47'; Kohili 90+4'	Stadium: Amar Hamam Stadium; Referee: Said Aouina

11 February 2024 Round 16	USM Alger	1–5	Paradou AC	Algiers
18:00	Bacha 81'	Report	Titraoui 16'; Kaassis 45+2'; Toulouenga 72'; Boulbina 82'; Kohili 90+3'	Stadium: Stade du 5 Juillet; Referee: Anes Azrine

16 February 2024 Round 17	Paradou AC	0–0	JS Kabylie	Dar El Beïda
15:30		Report		Stadium: Omar Benrabah Stadium; Referee: Mustapha Ghorbal

2 March 2024 Round 19	Paradou AC	0–0	US Biskra	Tizi Ouzou
17:00		Report		Stadium: 1 November 1954 Stadium; Referee: Tayeb Benyebka

15 March 2024 Round 20	MC Oran	2–0	Paradou AC	Oran
22:00	Benayad 16', 75'	Report		Stadium: Ahmed Zabana Stadium; Referee: Saïd Aouina

25 March 2024 Round 21	Paradou AC	0–0	ES Ben Aknoun	Dar El Beïda
15:30		Report		Stadium: Omar Benrabah Stadium; Referee: Youcef Gamouh

6 April 2024 Round 22	CS Constantine	2–1	Paradou AC	Constantine
22:00	Benchaira 3'; Madani 43'	Report	Hamidi 18' (pen.)	Stadium: Chahid Hamlaoui Stadium; Referee: Youcef Tayeb Bouderbal

16 April 2024 Round 18	CR Belouizdad	1–1	Paradou AC	Algiers
18:00	Belkhir 82'	Report	Boukerma 54'	Stadium: Stade du 5 Juillet; Referee: Nabil Boukhalfa

20 April 2024 Round 23	Paradou AC	1–0	MC El Bayadh	Dar El Beïda
16:00	Boukerma 42'	Report		Stadium: Omar Benrabah Stadium; Referee: Fateh Harkat

27 April 2024 Round 24	MC Alger	1–0	Paradou AC	Algiers
20:00	Naidji 79'	Report		Stadium: Stade du 5 Juillet; Referee: Lyes Bekouassa

11 May 2024 Round 25	Paradou AC	2–3	ASO Chlef	Dar El Beïda
17:00	Hamidi 59' (pen.); Boulbina 90'	Report	Bourdim 41' (pen.); Agbagno 45', 45+3'	Stadium: Omar Benrabah Stadium; Referee: Tahar Boudjemaa

17 May 2024 Round 26	JS Saoura	2–1	Paradou AC	Béchar
17:00	Souibaâh 40'; Khelif 90+1'	Report	Boulbina 48'	Stadium: 20 August 1955 Stadium; Referee: Yahia Dahar

26 May 2024 Round 27	Paradou AC	6–0	US Souf	Dar El Beïda
16:45	Boulbina 20', 41', 68'; Hamidi 27'; Bouzahzah 49'; Belghamri 54' (o.g.)	Report		Stadium: Omar Benrabah Stadium; Referee: Tayeb Benyabka

7 June 2024 Round 28	NC Magra	2–0	Paradou AC	Magra
16:45	Demane 17'; Kemoukh 45+2'	Report		Stadium: Boucheligue Brothers Stadium; Referee: Abderahmane Sahraoui

11 June 2024 Round 29	ES Sétif	2–1	Paradou AC	Sétif
16:45	Moulay 62'; Nouri 90+4'	Report	Sais 45+1'	Stadium: 8 May 1945 Stadium; Referee: Fateh Harkat

14 June 2024 Round 30	Paradou AC	2–0	USM Khenchela	Dar El Beïda
16:45	Boulbina 3', 11' (pen.)	Report		Stadium: Omar Benrabah Stadium; Referee: Mohamed Amine Bouteraa

=== Algerian Cup ===
2 February 2024 Round of 64	IRB Ouargla	0–1	Paradou AC	Ouargla
14:30		Report	Soukkou 70'	Stadium: 13 February Stadium; Referee: Abdenacer Baatouche
Note: Paradou AC Lineups: Moussaoui, Kherbouche, Ait Abdessalem, Bendouma, Kermiche, Belmaziz, Berkoun, Boukerma, Kaassis, Boulbina, Kohili. (Titraoui (substituted on) ), (Toulouenga (substituted on) ) (Soukkou (substituted on) ).

8 March 2024 Round of 32	Paradou AC	1–2	MC Oran	Dar El Beïda
15:00	Boulbina 76'	Report	Kerroum 88'; Motrani 90+1'	Stadium: Omar Benrabah Stadium; Referee: Billel Soltani
Note: Paradou AC Lineups:

== Squad information ==
=== Playing statistics ===
No.	Pos	Nat	Player	Total		Ligue 1		Algerian Cup	
No.	Pos	Nat	Player	Apps	Goals	Apps	Goals	Apps	Goals
Goalkeepers
1	GK	(Algeria) ALG	Mohamed Hady Sahnoun	1	0	1	0	0	0
16	GK	(Algeria) ALG	Mokhtar Ferrahi	9	0	9	0	0	0
23	GK	(Algeria) ALG	Toufik Moussaoui	23	0	22	0	1	0
Defenders
2	DF	(Algeria) ALG	Mohamed Réda Hamidi	27	3	27	3	0	0
4	DF	(Algeria) ALG	Idir Mokeddem	16	0	16	0	0	0
5	DF	(Algeria) ALG	Youcef Douar	19	0	19	0	0	0
6	DF	(Algeria) ALG	Ahmed Ait Abdesslem	23	1	22	1	1	0
15	DF	(Algeria) ALG	Chouaib Boulkaboul	6	0	6	0	0	0
22	DF	(Algeria) ALG	Abdellah Bendouma	23	0	22	0	1	0
24	MF	(Algeria) ALG	Sid Ali Kherbouche	5	0	4	0	1	0
25	DF	(Algeria) ALG	Fouad Kermiche	16	0	15	0	1	0
41	DF	(Algeria) ALG	Ouanisse Bouzahzah	6	1	6	1	0	0
Midfielders
3	MF	(Algeria) ALG	Zakaria Boukebal	4	0	4	0	0	0
8	MF	(Republic of the Congo) CGO	Gosim Elenga	1	0	1	0	0	0
9	MF	(Algeria) ALG	Abdelhek Belmaziz	12	0	11	0	1	0
10	MF	(Algeria) ALG	Mohamed Boukerma	24	2	23	2	1	0
18	MF	(Algeria) ALG	Abdeldjalil Tahri	0	0	0	0	0	0
20	MF	(Algeria) ALG	Abderrahmane Berkoune	20	0	19	0	1	0
26	MF	(Algeria) ALG	Taha Yassine Tahar	27	1	27	1	0	0
37	MF	(Algeria) ALG	Mohamed Tahar	2	0	2	0	0	0
44	MF	(Algeria) ALG	Moncef Bisker	2	0	2	0	0	0
61	MF	(Algeria) ALG	Mohamed Abdelkader	2	0	2	0	0	0
78	MF	(Algeria) ALG	Yassine Titraoui	28	8	27	8	1	0
Forwards
12	FW	(Algeria) ALG	Hicham Messiad	2	0	2	0	0	0
14	FW	(Algeria) ALG	Zerroug Boucif	8	0	8	0	0	0
19	FW	(Republic of the Congo) CGO	Christ Toulouenga	9	1	8	1	1	0
21	FW	(Algeria) ALG	Aymen Sais	9	1	9	1	0	0
27	FW	(Algeria) ALG	Djaber Kaassis	25	1	24	1	1	0
28	FW	(Algeria) ALG	Ben Ahmed Kohili	24	5	23	5	1	0
36	FW	(Algeria) ALG	Mohamed Ramdaoui	14	1	13	1	1	0
77	FW	(Algeria) ALG	Adil Boulbina	28	8	27	8	1	0
88	FW	(Algeria) ALG	Mustapha Soukkou	20	1	19	0	1	1
Players transferred out during the season
11	FW	(Algeria) ALG	Adel Belkacem Bouzida	8	1	8	1	0	0

Last updated: 14 June 2024
Source: soccerway.com

=== Goalscorers ===
As of 14 June 2024

Includes all competitive matches.

No.	Nat.	Player	Pos.	L 1	AC	TOTAL
77	(Algeria)	Adil Boulbina	FW	9	1	10
78	(Algeria)	Yacine Titraoui	MF	7	0	7
28	(Algeria)	Ben Ahmed Kohili	FW	5	0	5
2	(Algeria)	Mohamed Réda Hamidi	DF	3	0	3
10	(Algeria)	Mohamed Boukerma	MF	2	0	2
11	(Algeria)	Adel Belkacem Bouzida	FW	1	0	1
6	(Algeria)	Ahmed Ait Abdesslem	DF	1	0	1
26	(Algeria)	Taha Yassine Tahar	MF	1	0	1
36	(Algeria)	Mohamed Ramdaoui	FW	1	0	1
88	(Algeria)	Mustapha Soukkou	FW	0	1	1
27	(Algeria)	Djaber Kaassis	FW	1	0	1
19	(Republic of the Congo)	Christ Toulouenga	FW	1	0	1
41	(Algeria)	Ouanisse Bouzahzah	DF	1	0	1
21	(Algeria)	Aymen Sais	FW	1	0	1
Own Goals				2	0	2
Totals				36	2	38
