= 2022–23 Paradou AC season =

Paradou AC
2021–22 season
- President: Hacène Zetchi
- Head coach: Francisco Chaló (until 2 January 2023); Nadhir Leknaoui (from 9 January 2023)
- Stadium: Omar Benrabah Stadium
- Ligue 1: 9th
- Algerian Cup: Quarter-finals
- Top goalscorer: League: Adel Belkacem Bouzida; Merouane Zerrouki (6 goals); All: Adel Belkacem Bouzida (7 goals)
- Biggest win: Paradou AC 4–0 MC Oran
- Biggest defeat: USM Khenchela 3–0 Paradou AC
Home colours	Away colours

The 2022–23 season was Paradou AC's 8th season and the club's 6th consecutive season in the top flight of Algerian football. In addition to the domestic league, Paradou AC participated in the Algerian Cup.

== Squad list ==
Players and squad numbers last updated on 5 February 2023.
Note: Flags indicate national team as has been defined under FIFA eligibility rules. Players may hold more than one non-FIFA nationality.

No.	Nat.	Position	Name	Date of Birth (Age)	Signed from
Goalkeepers
1	(Algeria)	GK	Mohamed Hady Sahnoun	5 January 2002 (aged 20)	(Algeria) Youth system
14	(Algeria)	GK	Kheireddine Boussouf	7 December 1987 (aged 35)	(Algeria) AS Ain M'lila
23	(Algeria)	GK	Toufik Moussaoui	20 April 1991 (aged 31)	(Morocco) OC Khouribga
Defenders
2	(Algeria)	RB	Mohamed Réda Hamidi	8 June 2001 (aged 21)	(Algeria) Youth system
4	(Algeria)	RB	Kheir Eddine Ali Haïmoud	12 June 1999 (aged 21)	(Algeria) NA Hussein Dey
5	(Algeria)	CB	Youcef Douar	15 September 1997 (aged 25)	(Algeria) Youth system
6	(Algeria)	CB	Hocine Dehiri	16 September 2000 (aged 22)	(Algeria) Youth system
8	(Algeria)	RB	Walid Sebai	30 July 1998 (aged 24)	(Algeria) JS Tixeraïne
15	(Algeria)	LB	Chouaib Boulkaboul	3 April 2001 (aged 21)	(Algeria) Youth system
22	(Algeria)	LB	Abdellah Bendouma	7 October 2001 (aged 21)	(Algeria) USM Bel Abbès
24	(Algeria)	CB	Sid Ali Kherbouche	9 April 2000 (aged 22)	(Algeria) Youth system
25	(Algeria)	CB	Idir Mokeddem	5 June 1994 (aged 27)	(Algeria) JS Saoura
35	(Algeria)	CB	Abdeldjalil Mancer	16 March 2002 (aged 20)	(Algeria) Youth system
Midfielders
3	(Algeria)	MF	Nour El Islam Melikchi	23 July 1996 (aged 26)	(Algeria) CA Bordj Bou Arreridj
9	(Algeria)	MF	Abdelhek Belmaziz	12 July 2001 (aged 21)	(Algeria) Youth system
10	(Algeria)	MF	Mohamed Boukerma	5 August 2001 (aged 21)	(Algeria) Youth system
16	(Algeria)	MF	Yassine Beldjilali	22 January 2000 (aged 22)	(Algeria) Youth system
17	(Algeria)	MF	Houcine Aoued	21 April 1999 (aged 23)	(Algeria) RC Relizane
18	(Algeria)	MF	Abdeldjalil Tahri	15 October 1998 (aged 24)	(Algeria) Youth system
20	(Algeria)	MF	Abderrahmane Berkoun	13 March 2000 (aged 22)	(Algeria) RC Arbaâ
26	(Algeria)	MF	Taha Yassine Tahar	23 September 2000 (aged 22)	(Algeria) RC Relizane
78	(Algeria)	MF	Yassine Titraoui	26 July 2003 (aged 19)	(Algeria) Youth system
Forwards
11	(Algeria)	FW	Aymen Zakaria Sais	12 March 2001 (aged 21)	(Algeria) Youth system
12	(Algeria)	FW	Hicham Messiad	21 April 1999 (aged 23)	(Algeria) Youth system
19	(Algeria)	FW	Merouane Zerrouki	25 January 2001 (aged 21)	(Algeria) Youth system
21	(Algeria)	FW	Aymene Boualleg	8 May 2001 (aged 21)	(Algeria) Youth system
27	(Algeria)	FW	Djaber Kaassis	3 May 1999 (aged 23)	(Algeria) Youth system
31	(Algeria)	FW	Adel Belkacem Bouzida	28 February 2002 (aged 20)	(Algeria) Youth system
77	(Algeria)	FW	Adil Boulbina	2 May 2003 (aged 19)	(Algeria) Youth system

== Transfers ==
=== In ===
==== Summer ====
Date	Pos	Player	From club	Transfer fee	Source
11 July 2022	LB	(Algeria) Abdellah Bendouma	USM Bel Abbès	Free transfer	
12 July 2022	MF	(Algeria) Taha Yassine Tahar	RC Relizane	Loan return	
28 July 2022	MF	(Algeria) Abderrahmane Berkoune	RC Arbaâ	Loan return	-

==== Winter ====
Date	Pos	Player	From club	Transfer fee	Source
31 January 2023	GK	(Algeria) Toufik Moussaoui	(Morocco) OC Khouribga	Free transfer	
4 February 2023	CB	(Algeria) Idir Mokeddem	JS Saoura	Free transfer	
4 February 2023	FW	(Algeria) Walid Sbia	Unattached	Free transfer	

=== Out ===
==== Summer ====
Date	Pos	Player	To club	Transfer fee	Source
29 June 2022	MF	(Algeria) Tayeb Hamoudi	MC Alger	Free transfer	
14 July 2022	RB	(Algeria) Aimen Bouguerra	CR Belouizdad	Undisclosed	
22 July 2022	FW	(Algeria) Ahmed Nadhir Benbouali	(Belgium) Charleroi	Undisclosed	
27 July 2022	FW	(Algeria) Zerroug Boucif	ES Sétif	Loan	
28 July 2022	FW	(Algeria) Ghiles Guenaoui	ES Sétif	Free transfer	
28 July 2022	FW	(Algeria) Riad Benayad	(Tunisia) ES Tunis	Undisclosed	
31 July 2022	FW	(Algeria) Yousri Bouzok	(Morocco) Raja CA	Undisclosed	
8 August 2022	LB	(Algeria) Hamza Mouali	(France) Stade Lavallois	Loan	
8 August 2022	CB	(Algeria) Islem Chebbour	ES Sétif	Free transfer	
15 August 2022	CB	(Algeria) Chaouki Benleguemari	NRB Teleghma	Free transfer	
22 August 2022	GK	(Algeria) Abderrahmane Medjadel	JS Kabylie	5,0000,000 DA	
20 September 2022	MF	(Uganda) Allan Okello	(Uganda) KCCA FC	Loan	

==== Winter ====
Date	Pos	Player	To club	Transfer fee	Source
31 January 2023	FW	(Algeria) Adem Redjem	Paradou AC	Undisclosed	

== Competitions ==
=== Overview ===
Competition	Record								Started round	Final position / round	First match	Last match
Competition	G	W	D	L	GF	GA	GD	Win %	Started round	Final position / round	First match	Last match
Ligue 1	30	11	8	11	35	33	+2	36.67	—N/a	9th	27 August 2022	15 July 2023
Algerian Cup	4	2	1	1	6	5	+1	50.00	Round of 64	Quarter-finals	20 December 2022	12 May 2023
Total	34	13	9	12	41	38	+3	38.24				

Updated to match played 15 July 2023
Source: Competitions

=== Ligue 1 ===
==== League table ====
Pos	Team	Pld	W	D	L	GF	GA	GD	Pts	Qualification or relegation
7	ASO Chlef	30	11	9	10	36	31	+5	42	Qualification for CAF Confederation Cup (Note: ASO Chlef qualified for the 2023–24 CAF Confederation Cup by winning the 2022–23 Algerian Cup.)
8	USM Khenchela	30	12	6	12	29	29	0	42	
9	Paradou AC	30	11	8	11	35	33	+2	41	
10	MC Oran	30	11	8	11	27	34	−7	41	
11	USM Alger	30	11	7	12	31	30	+1	40	Qualification for CAF Confederation Cup (Note: USMA Alger qualified for the 2023–24 CAF Confederation Cup as the title holders.)

Updated to match(es) played on 15 July 2023. Source: the-sports.org
Rules for classification: 1) points; 2) head-to-head points; 3) head-to-head goal difference; 4) goal difference; 5) total goals; 6) fairplay ranking; 7) playoff.

==== Results summary ====
Overall								Home						Away					
Pld	W	D	L	GF	GA	GD	Pts	W	D	L	GF	GA	GD	W	D	L	GF	GA	GD
30	11	8	11	35	33	+2	41	8	2	5	21	15	+6	3	6	6	14	18	−4

Last updated: 15 July 2023.
Source: Competitive matches

==== Results by round ====
Round	1	2	3	4	5	6	7	8	9	10	11	12	13	14	15	16	17	18	19	20	21	22	23	24	25	26	27	28	29	30
Ground	A	H	A	H	A	H	A	H	A	H	A	H	A	H	A	H	A	H	A	H	A	H	A	H	A	H	A	H	A	H
Result	W	L	D	L	L	L	L	W	D	L	L	D	W	L	D	W	D	D	L	W	L	W	D	L	W	D	W	W	W	W
Position	5	9	8	11	11	15	15	15	15	15	15	15	15	15	14	14	14	14	15	15	15	15	15	15	15	15	14	14	12	9

Updated to match(es) played on 15 July 2023. Source: Competitive matches
A = Away; H = Home; W = Win; D = Draw; L = Loss

==== Matches ====
The league fixtures were announced on 19 July 2022.

27 August 2022 Round 1	NC Magra	1–2	Paradou AC	Magra
16:45	Saidi 78'	Report	Bouzida 11'; Aoued 90+2'	Stadium: Boucheligue Brothers Stadium; Referee: Mehdi Abid Charef

2 September 2022 Round 2	Paradou AC	0–1	CR Belouizdad	Dar El Beïda
16:45		Report	Belkhir 45'	Stadium: Omar Benrabah Stadium; Referee: Houssem Benyahia

10 September 2022 Round 3	ASO Chlef	1–1	Paradou AC	Relizane
16:45	Kacem 71' (pen.)	Report	Bouzida 67'	Stadium: Tahar Zoughari Stadium; Referee: Youcef Gamouh

17 September 2022 Round 4	Paradou AC	0–1	CS Constantine	Dar El Beïda
16:30		Report	Ardji 67'	Stadium: Omar Benrabah Stadium; Referee: Mustapha Ghorbal

2 October 2022 Round 6	Paradou AC	0–1	USM Khenchela	Dar El Beïda
16:00		Report	Zaidi 84'	Stadium: Omar Benrabah Stadium; Referee: Bilal Bendjahene

14 October 2022 Round 8	Paradou AC	2–1	HB Chelghoum Laïd	Dar El Beïda
15:00	Bouzida 16', 80'	Report	Karaoui 51'	Stadium: Omar Benrabah Stadium; Referee: Hadj Aissa Semmache

21 October 2022 Round 9	MC El Bayadh	0–0	Paradou AC	El Bayadh
15:00		Report		Stadium: Zakaria Medjdoub Stadium; Referee: Abdelmoumen Touabti

25 October 2022 Round 5	USM Alger	2–1	Paradou AC	Dar El Beïda
15:00	Douar 2' (o.g.); Meziane 25'	Report	Aoued 65'	Stadium: Omar Benrabah Stadium; Referee: Hamza Bouslimani

5 November 2022 Round 10	MC Oran	1–0	Paradou AC	Oran
18:00	Naâmani 54'	Report		Stadium: Ahmed Zabana Stadium; Referee: Nadjib Meziani

9 November 2022 Round 11	Paradou AC	1–3	ES Sétif	Dar El Beïda
15:00	Zerrouki 90+1'	Report	Zamoum 38'; Kendouci 75', 90+1'	Stadium: Omar Benrabah Stadium; Referee: Abdellah Benchehida

29 November 2022 Round 12	MC Alger	2–2	Paradou AC	Dar El Beïda
15:00	Esso 64'; Bendouma 83' (o.g.)	Report	Abdellaoui 2' (o.g.); Aoued 31'	Stadium: Omar Benrabah Stadium; Referee: Mehdi Abid Charef

3 December 2022 Round 7	JS Kabylie	2–1	Paradou AC	Tizi Ouzou
18:00	Mouaki 48'; Boukhanchouche 76'	Report	Bouzida 7'	Stadium: 1 November 1954 Stadium; Referee: Mohamed Bouteraa

7 December 2022 Round 13	Paradou AC	2–1	JS Saoura	Belouizdad
15:00	Aoued 7' (pen.); Boulbina 81'	Report	Benyahia 88'	Stadium: 20 August 1955 Stadium; Referee: Abdelmoumen Touabti

11 December 2022 Round 14	US Biskra	2–1	Paradou AC	Biskra
15:00	Siam 6'; Abid 65' (pen.)	Report	Messiad 24'	Stadium: 18 February Stadium; Referee: Bilal Bendjahene

24 December 2022 Round 15	Paradou AC	1–1	RC Arbaâ	Belouizdad
14:30	Zerrouki 24' (pen.)	Report	Zaouche 84'	Stadium: 20 August 1955 Stadium; Referee: Radouane Alou

10 February 2023 Round 16	Paradou AC	3–1	NC Magra	Dar El Beïda
15:00	Boulbina 35'; Zerrouki 39' (pen.); Titraoui 56'	Report	Ladjabi 64'	Stadium: Omar Benrabah Stadium; Referee: Mehadji Tayeb Bouderbali

24 February 2023 Round 18	Paradou AC	2–2	ASO Chlef	Dar El Beïda
15:00	Zerrouki 86'; Douar 90+7'	Report	Souibaâh 65'; Addadi 90+16' (pen.)	Stadium: Omar Benrabah Stadium; Referee: Abdelmoumen Touabti

1 April 2023 Round 21	USM Khenchela	3–0	Paradou AC	Khenchela
15:45	Bayazid 30'; Yaiche 45'; Baakoh 66'	Report		Stadium: Amar Hamam Stadium; Referee: Mohamed Bouteraa

8 April 2023 Round 22	Paradou AC	1–0	JS Kabylie	Dar El Beïda
15:45	Hamidi 19'	Report		Stadium: Omar Benrabah Stadium; Referee: Youcef Gamouh

13 April 2023 Round 17	CR Belouizdad	1–1	Paradou AC	Algiers
22:30	Wamba 13'	Report	Keddad 11' (o.g.)	Stadium: Stade du 5 Juillet; Referee: Abdelali Ibrir

18 April 2023 Round 19	CS Constantine	1–0	Paradou AC	Constantine
15:45	Mokeddem 48' (o.g.)	Report		Stadium: Ramadane Ben Abdelmalek Stadium; Referee: Abdellah Benchehida

17 May 2023 Round 23	HB Chelghoum Laïd	1–1	Paradou AC	Chelghoum Laïd
16:00	Chaibi 36'	Report	Boulbina 75'	Stadium: 11 December 1961 Stadium; Referee: Mohamed Saidi

21 May 2023 Round 20	Paradou AC	2–1	USM Alger	Dar El Beïda
16:00	Mokeddem 31'; Bouzida 90+6'	Report	Alharaish 53'	Stadium: Omar Benrabah Stadium; Referee: Redouane Allou

31 May 2023 Round 24	Paradou AC	0–1	MC El Bayadh	Dar El Beïda
16:00		Report	Benzid 36' (pen.)	Stadium: Omar Benrabah Stadium; Referee: Abdelali Ibrir

6 June 2023 Round 25	Paradou AC	4–0	MC Oran	Dar El Beïda
16:30	Hamidi 41' (pen.); Douar 51' (pen.); Kohili 69' (pen.); Boukerma 82'	Report		Stadium: Omar Benrabah Stadium; Referee: Nadjib Meziani

1 July 2023 Round 26	ES Sétif	0–0	Paradou AC	Sétif
17:00		Report		Stadium: 8 May 1945 Stadium; Referee: Mehadji Tayeb Bouderbali

4 July 2023 Round 27	Paradou AC	1–0	MC Alger	Dar El Beïda
17:00	Zerrouki 29'	Report		Stadium: Omar Benrabah Stadium; Referee: Ali Nader

7 July 2023 Round 28	JS Saoura	0–1	Paradou AC	Béchar
17:15		Report	Kohili 89'	Stadium: 20 August 1955 Stadium; Referee: Abdellah Benchehida

10 July 2023 Round 29	Paradou AC	2–1	US Biskra	Dar El Beïda
17:15	Bendouma 42'; Douar 51'	Report	Baâli 55'	Stadium: Omar Benrabah Stadium; Referee: El Hadj Aissa Semmache

15 July 2023 Round 30	RC Arbaâ	1–3	Paradou AC	Larbaâ
17:15	Toumi 19' (pen.)	Report	Zerrouki 61'; Soukkou 82'; Titraoui 90+1'	Stadium: Ismaïl Makhlouf Stadium; Referee: Houssam Benyahia

=== Algerian Cup ===
20 December 2022 Round of 64	Paradou AC	2–2 (a.e.t.) (2–1 p)	WA Mostaganem	Dar El Beïda
14:00	Messiad 41'; Kherbouche 77'	Report	Benrokia 8' (pen.), 66'	Stadium: Omar Benrabah Stadium; Referee: Fetouh Koriche
Note: Paradou AC Lineups: Boussouf, Boulkaboul, Dehiri, Tahar, Kherbouche, Tahri, Boukerma, Titraoui, Boulbina, Messiad, Zerrouki. (Redjem, '), (Aoued, ')

16 February 2023 Round of 32	Paradou AC	2–0	CS Constantine	Dar El Beïda
14:30	Bouzida 50'; Berkoune 90+5'	Report		Stadium: Omar Benrabah Stadium; Referee: Bilal Soltani
Note: LParadou AC Lineups: Boussouf, Hamidi, Bendouma, Mokeddem, Douar, Tahar, Tahri (Kaassis, 63'), Titraoui, Boulbina (Berkoune, 90'), Bouzida (Kherbouche, 75'), Zerrouki (Sebai, 90').

28 April 2023 Round of 16	Paradou AC	2–1	ES Mostaganem	Dar El Beïda
15:00	Soukkou 20'; Titraoui 53'	Report	Moulay 63'	Stadium: Omar Benrabah Stadium; Referee: Bilal Soltani
Note: Paradou AC Lineups: Boussouf, Bendouma (Berkoune, 83'), Kherbouche, Mokeddem, Douar, Tahar, Tahri (Kaassis, 60'), Titraoui, Boulbina (Boulkaboul, 60'), Soukkou (Messiad, 83'), Zerrouki.

12 May 2023 Quarter-finals	JS Saoura	2–0	Paradou AC	Béchar
20:00	Zaitri 13'; Bellatreche 77'			Stadium: 20 August 1955 Stadium; Referee: Ali Nader
Note: Paradou AC Lineups:

== Squad information ==
=== Playing statistics ===
No.	Pos	Nat	Player	Total		Ligue 1		Algerian Cup	
No.	Pos	Nat	Player	Apps	Goals	Apps	Goals	Apps	Goals
Goalkeepers
1	GK	(Algeria) ALG	Mohamed Hady Sahnoun	3	0	3	0	0	0
14	GK	(Algeria) ALG	Kheireddine Boussouf	23	0	20	0	3	0
23	GK	(Algeria) ALG	Toufik Moussaoui	7	0	7	0	0	0
Defenders
2	DF	(Algeria) ALG	Mohamed Réda Hamidi	28	2	27	2	1	0
4	DF	(Algeria) ALG	Kheir Eddine Ali Haïmoud	1	0	1	0	0	0
5	DF	(Algeria) ALG	Youcef Douar	27	2	25	2	2	0
6	DF	(Algeria) ALG	Hocine Dehiri	14	0	13	0	1	0
8	DF	(Algeria) ALG	Walid Sebai	4	0	3	0	1	0
15	DF	(Algeria) ALG	Chouaib Boulkaboul	16	0	14	0	2	0
22	DF	(Algeria) ALG	Abdellah Bendouma	23	1	21	1	2	0
24	MF	(Algeria) ALG	Sid Ali Kherbouche	14	1	11	0	3	1
25	DF	(Algeria) ALG	Idir Mokeddem	17	1	15	1	2	0
35	MF	(Algeria) ALG	Abdeldjalil Mancer	10	0	10	0	0	0
Midfielders
3	MF	(Algeria) ALG	Nour El Islam Melikchi	0	0	0	0	0	0
9	MF	(Algeria) ALG	Abdelhek Belmaziz	7	0	7	0	0	0
10	MF	(Algeria) ALG	Mohamed Boukerma	13	1	12	1	1	0
16	MF	(Algeria) ALG	Yassine Beldjilali	1	0	1	0	0	0
18	MF	(Algeria) ALG	Abdeldjalil Tahri	8	0	5	0	3	0
20	MF	(Algeria) ALG	Abderrahmane Berkoune	14	1	12	0	2	1
26	MF	(Algeria) ALG	Taha Yassine Tahar	29	0	26	0	3	0
44	MF	(Algeria) ALG	Moncef Bisker	1	0	1	0	0	0
49	MF	(Algeria) ALG	Abdelghani Laallam	1	0	1	0	0	0
51	MF	(Algeria) ALG	Zakaria Boukebal	3	0	3	0	0	0
78	MF	(Algeria) ALG	Yassine Titraoui	29	3	26	2	3	1
87	MF	(Algeria) ALG	Mohamed Saadi	1	0	1	0	0	0
Forwards
11	FW	(Algeria) ALG	Aymen Zakaria Sais	6	0	6	0	0	0
12	FW	(Algeria) ALG	Hicham Messiad	19	3	17	2	2	1
17	FW	(Algeria) ALG	Houcine Aoued	15	4	14	4	1	0
19	FW	(Algeria) ALG	Merouane Zerrouki	29	7	26	7	3	0
21	FW	(Algeria) ALG	Aymene Boualleg	1	0	1	0	0	0
27	FW	(Algeria) ALG	Djaber Kaassis	27	0	25	0	2	0
31	FW	(Algeria) ALG	Adel Belkacem Bouzida	20	7	19	6	1	1
36	FW	(Algeria) ALG	Mohamed Ramdaoui	1	0	1	0	0	0
77	FW	(Algeria) ALG	Adil Boulbina	27	2	24	2	3	0
88	FW	(Algeria) ALG	Mustapha Soukkou	11	2	10	1	1	1
98	FW	(Algeria) ALG	Ben Ahmed Kohili	5	2	5	2	0	0
Players transferred out during the season
8	FW	(Algeria) ALG	Adem Redjem	11	0	10	0	1	0

Last updated: 15 July 2023
Source: soccerway.com

=== Goalscorers ===
As of 15 July 2023

Includes all competitive matches. The list is sorted alphabetically by surname when total goals are equal.

No.	Nat.	Player	Pos.	L 1	AC	TOTAL
31	(Algeria)	Adel Belkacem Bouzida	FW	6	1	7
19	(Algeria)	Merouane Zerrouki	FW	6	0	6
17	(Algeria)	Houcine Aoued	FW	4	0	4
77	(Algeria)	Adil Boulbina	FW	3	0	3
5	(Algeria)	Youcef Douar	DF	3	0	3
78	(Algeria)	Yacine Titraoui	MF	2	1	3
12	(Algeria)	Hicham Messiad	FW	1	1	2
88	(Algeria)	Mustapha Soukkou	FW	1	1	2
2	(Algeria)	Mohamed Réda Hamidi	DF	2	0	2
98	(Algeria)	Ben Ahmed Kohili	FW	2	0	2
24	(Algeria)	Sid Ali Kherbouche	MF	0	1	1
20	(Algeria)	Abderrahmane Berkoune	MF	0	1	1
25	(Algeria)	Idir Mokeddem	DF	1	0	1
10	(Algeria)	Mohamed Boukerma	MF	1	0	1
22	(Algeria)	Abdellah Bendouma	DF	1	0	1
Own Goals				2	0	2
Totals				35	6	41
