= 2020–21 Paradou AC season =

Paradou AC
2020–21 season
- President: Hassen Zetchi
- Head coach: Hakim Malek (from 26 August 2020) (until 17 January 2021); Pierrick Le Bert (from 19 January 2021) (until 6 July 2021); Tahar Chérif El-Ouazzani (from 6 July 2021)
- Stadium: Omar Benrabah Stadium
- Ligue 1: 11th
- League Cup: Round of 16
- Top goalscorer: League: Ahmed Nadhir Benbouali (9 goals); All: Ahmed Nadhir Benbouali (9 goals)
- Highest home attendance: 0 (Note: no one can attend games due to the COVID-19 pandemic)
- Lowest home attendance: 0 (Note: no one can attend games due to the COVID-19 pandemic)
- Average home league attendance: 0 (Note: no one can attend games due to the COVID-19 pandemic)
| Home colours | Away colours |

In the 2020–21 season, Paradou AC is competing in the Ligue 1 for the 6th season, as well as the Algerian Cup. It is their 4th consecutive season in the top flight of Algerian football. They will be competing in Ligue 1.

== Squad list ==
Players and squad numbers last updated on 15 November 2020.
Note: Flags indicate national team as has been defined under FIFA eligibility rules. Players may hold more than one non-FIFA nationality.

| No. | Nat. | Position | Name | Date of birth (age) | Signed from |
Goalkeepers
| 1 | (Algeria) | GK | Mokhtar Ferrahi | 24 January 1996 (aged 24) | (Algeria) Youth system |
| 14 | (Algeria) | GK | Kheireddine Boussouf | 7 December 1987 (aged 33) | (Algeria) AS Ain M'lila |
| 16 | (Algeria) | GK | Omar Hadji | 9 November 1991 (aged 29) | (Algeria) AS Ain M'lila |
Defenders
| 2 | (Algeria) | LB | Abdelhak Elardja | 4 September 1998 (aged 22) | (Algeria) Youth system |
| 5 | (Algeria) | CB | Youcef Douar | 15 September 1997 (aged 23) | (Algeria) Youth system |
| 13 | (Algeria) | LB | Juba Chirani | 4 January 1998 (aged 22) | (Algeria) Youth system |
| 20 | (Algeria) | LB | Hamza Mouali | 16 January 1998 (aged 22) | (Algeria) Youth system |
| 21 | (Algeria) | RB | Islam Arous | 6 August 1996 (aged 24) | (Algeria) MC Alger Loan return |
| 22 | (Algeria) | CB | Tarek Bouabta | 21 July 1991 (aged 29) | (Algeria) JSM Bejaia |
| 24 | (Algeria) | CB | Islem Chebbour | 22 March 1996 (aged 24) | (Algeria) HB Chelghoum Laïd |
| 25 | (Algeria) | RB | Aimen Bouguerra | 10 January 1997 (aged 23) | (Algeria) Youth system |
| 45 | (Algeria) | CB | Hocine Dehiri | 16 September 2000 (aged 20) | (Algeria) Youth system |
| 58 | (Algeria) | RB | Mohamed Réda Hamidi | 8 June 2001 (aged 19) | (Algeria) Youth system |
Midfielders
| 4 | (Algeria) | DM | Tayeb Hamoudi | 10 February 1995 (aged 25) | (Algeria) US Biskra |
| 15 | (Algeria) | DM | Zakaria Messibah | 16 October 1995 (aged 25) | (Algeria) Youth system |
| 17 | (Algeria) | DM | Abderrezak Kibboua | 2 December 1999 (aged 21) | (Algeria) Youth system |
| 18 | (Algeria) | DM | Abdeldjalil Tahri | 15 October 1998 (aged 22) | (Algeria) Youth system |
| 19 | (Algeria) | | Mohamed Fenniri | 20 January 1998 (aged 22) | (Algeria) Youth system |
| 39 | (Algeria) | AM | Mohamed Boukerma | 5 August 2001 (aged 19) | (Algeria) Youth system |
| 42 | (Algeria) | CM | Abdelkahar Kadri | 24 June 2000 (aged 20) | (Algeria) Youth system |
| 48 | (Algeria) | CM | Adem Zorgane | 6 January 2000 (aged 20) | (Algeria) Youth system |
| 49 | (Algeria) | AM | Abderrahmane Berkoune | 13 March 2000 (aged 20) | (Algeria) Youth system |
Forwards
| 6 | (Algeria) | | Abdelkader Ghorab | 28 February 1998 (aged 22) | (Algeria) Youth system |
| 7 | (Algeria) | | Sid Ali Mebarki | 13 July 1998 (aged 22) | (Algeria) Youth system |
| 8 | (Uganda) | ST | Allan Okello | 4 July 2000 (aged 20) | (Uganda) Kampala Capital City |
| 9 | (Algeria) | ST | Riad Benayad | 2 November 1998 (aged 22) | (Algeria) Youth system |
| 10 | (Algeria) | ST | Oussama Kismoun | 19 February 1996 (aged 24) | (Algeria) Unattached |
| 11 | (Algeria) | LW | Ghiles Guenaoui | 2 August 1998 (aged 22) | (Algeria) Youth system |
| 23 | (Algeria) | RW | Adem Redjem | 1 January 1997 (aged 24) | (Algeria) CS Constantine |
| 26 | (Algeria) | RW | Yousri Bouzok | 18 August 1996 (aged 24) | (Algeria) Youth system |
| 27 | (Algeria) | LW | Djaber Kaassis | 3 May 1999 (aged 21) | (Algeria) Youth system |
| 35 | (Algeria) | ST | Ahmed Nadhir Benbouali | 17 April 2000 (aged 20) | (Algeria) Youth system |
| 41 | (Algeria) | RW | Hicham Messiad | 21 April 1999 (aged 21) | (Algeria) Youth system |
| 99 | (Algeria) | ST | Merouane Zerrouki | 25 January 2001 (aged 19) | (Algeria) Youth system |

== Competitions ==
=== Overview ===
| Competition | Record | | | | | | | | Started round | Final position / round | First match | Last match |
| Competition | G | W | D | L | GF | GA | GD | Win % | Started round | Final position / round | First match | Last match |
|---|---|---|---|---|---|---|---|---|---|---|---|---|
| Ligue 1 | 38 | 13 | 11 | 14 | 53 | 53 | +0 | 34.21 | —N/a | 11th | 27 November 2020 | 24 August 2021 |
| League Cup | 1 | 0 | 1 | 0 | 0 | 0 | +0 | 0.00 | Round of 16 | | 30 April 2021 | |
| Total | 39 | 13 | 12 | 14 | 53 | 53 | +0 | 33.33 | | | | |

Updated to match played 24 August 2021
Source: Competitions

== League table ==
| Pos | Team | Pld | W | D | L | GF | GA | GD | Pts |
|---|---|---|---|---|---|---|---|---|---|
| 9 | NC Magra | 38 | 14 | 10 | 14 | 38 | 44 | −6 | 52 |
| 10 | Olympique de Médéa | 38 | 13 | 12 | 13 | 40 | 43 | −3 | 51 |
| 11 | Paradou AC | 38 | 13 | 11 | 14 | 53 | 53 | 0 | 50 |
| 12 | NA Hussein Dey | 38 | 11 | 14 | 13 | 46 | 45 | +1 | 47 |
| 13 | RC Relizane | 38 | 13 | 12 | 13 | 35 | 49 | −14 | 47 (Note: On May 16, 2021 after the participation of a penalized player Younes Koulkheir with RC Relizane against ES Sétif. RC Relizane Lost the match 3–0 and deducted 4 points.) |

Updated to match(es) played on 28 August 2021. Source: dzfoot.com
Rules for classification: 1) points; 2) head-to-head points; 3) head-to-head goal difference; 4) goal difference; 5) total goals; 6) fairplay ranking; 7) playoff.

=== Results summary ===
| Overall | | | | | | | | Home | | | | | | Away | | | | | |
| Pld | W | D | L | GF | GA | GD | Pts | W | D | L | GF | GA | GD | W | D | L | GF | GA | GD |
|---|---|---|---|---|---|---|---|---|---|---|---|---|---|---|---|---|---|---|---|
| 38 | 13 | 11 | 14 | 53 | 53 | 0 | 50 | 8 | 6 | 5 | 31 | 26 | +5 | 5 | 5 | 9 | 22 | 27 | −5 |

Last updated: 24 August 2021.
Source: Competitive matches

=== Results by round ===
| Round | 1 | 2 | 3 | 4 | 5 | 6 | 7 | 8 | 9 | 10 | 11 | 12 | 13 | 14 | 15 | 16 | 17 | 18 | 19 | 20 | 21 | 22 | 23 | 24 | 25 | 26 | 27 | 28 | 29 | 30 | 31 | 32 | 33 | 34 | 35 | 36 | 37 | 38 |
|---|---|---|---|---|---|---|---|---|---|---|---|---|---|---|---|---|---|---|---|---|---|---|---|---|---|---|---|---|---|---|---|---|---|---|---|---|---|---|
| Ground | | | | | | | | | | | | | | | | | | | | | | | | | | | | | | | | | | | | | | |
| Result | D | D | D | D | W | L | D | D | W | L | D | W | D | W | L | W | W | L | D | W | W | L | D | L | L | L | D | W | L | L | W | W | W | W | L | L | L | L |
| Position | 8 | 10 | 9 | 10 | 7 | 11 | 11 | 11 | 11 | 11 | 11 | 10 | 10 | 9 | 10 | 9 | 9 | 11 | 11 | 11 | 8 | 10 | 10 | 10 | 10 | 10 | 10 | 10 | 10 | 10 | 10 | 10 | 10 | 9 | 9 | 9 | 9 | 11 |

Updated to match(es) played on 24 August 2021. Source: Competitive matches
A = Away; H = Home; W = Win; D = Draw; L = Loss

=== Matches ===
On 22 October 2020, the Algerian Ligue Professionnelle 1 fixtures were announced.

| 27 November 2020 Round 1 | RC Relizane | 1–1 | Paradou AC | Relizane |
| 15:00 | Hitala 44' | Soccerway report | Benbouali 17' | Stadium: Stade Tahar Zoughari; Attendance: 0 (close doors); Referee: Mehdi Abid Charef |

| 4 December 2020 Round 2 | Paradou AC | 2–2 | CS Constantine | Dar El Beïda |
| 15:00 | Benbouali 30'; Guenaoui 39' | Soccerway report | Bentahar 41', 90+2' | Stadium: Omar Benrabah Stadium; Attendance: 0 (close doors); Referee: Said Aouina |

| 11 December 2020 Round 3 | Paradou AC | 1–1 | MC Alger | Dar El Beïda |
| 15:00 | Bouzok 18' (pen.) | Soccerway report | Frioui 90' | Stadium: Omar Benrabah Stadium; Attendance: 0 (close doors); Referee: Mustapha Bessiri |

| 19 December 2020 Round 4 | US Biskra | 1–1 | Paradou AC | Biskra |
| 14:30 | Heriat 51' (pen.) | Soccerway report | Benbouali 81' | Stadium: Stade du 18 Février; Attendance: 0 (close doors); Referee: Abderrezzak Arab |

| 23 December 2020 Round 5 | Paradou AC | 3–2 | CA Bordj Bou Arreridj | Dar El Beïda |
| 14:30 | Guenaoui 48'; Zorgane 73' (pen.); Kismoun 90+2' | Soccerway report | Gattal 11'; Ziani 45' | Stadium: Omar Benrabah Stadium; Attendance: 0 (close doors); Referee: Ali Nader |

| 27 December 2020 Round 6 | ES Sétif | 1–0 | Paradou AC | Sétif |
| 15:00 | Amoura 81' | Soccerway report | | Stadium: Stade 8 Mai 1945; Attendance: 0 (close doors); Referee: Mohamed Boutaraa |

| 11 January 2021 Round 7 | Paradou AC | 1–1 | CR Belouizdad | Dar El Beïda |
| 14:00 | Bouguerra 15' | Soccerway report | Koukpo 31' | Stadium: Omar Benrabah Stadium; Attendance: 0 (close doors); Referee: Farouk Mial |

| 16 January 2021 Round 8 | NC Magra | 0–0 | Paradou AC | Magra |
| 14:00 | | Soccerway report | | Stadium: Boucheligue Brothers Stadium; Attendance: 0 (close doors); Referee: Bilal Bendjahene |

| 22 January 2021 Round 9 | Paradou AC | 3–0 | JSM Skikda | Dar El Beïda |
| 14:30 | Zorgane 45' (pen.), 53'; Mouali 68' | Soccerway report | | Stadium: Omar Benrabah Stadium; Attendance: 0 (close doors); Referee: Mohamed Saïdi |

| 26 January 2021 Round 10 | ASO Chlef | 2–1 | Paradou AC | Chlef |
| 15:00 | Benzaza 60'; Beldjilali 75' | Soccerway report | Mouali 4' | Stadium: Stade Mohamed Boumezrag; Attendance: 0 (close doors); Referee: Mehdi Abid Charef |

| 30 January 2021 Round 11 | Paradou AC | 0–0 | AS Aïn M'lila | Dar El Beïda |
| 14:30 | | Soccerway report | | Stadium: Omar Benrabah Stadium; Attendance: 0 (close doors); Referee: Mohamed Boutaraa |

| 6 February 2021 Round 12 | WA Tlemcen | 1–4 | Paradou AC | Tlemcen |
| 15:00 | Zermane 60' (pen.) | Soccerway report | Boucif 30', 42'; Okello 34'; Benbouali 63' | Stadium: Stade Akid Lotfi; Attendance: 0 (close doors); Referee: Farouk Mial |

| 12 February 2021 Round 13 | USM Bel Abbès | 0–0 | Paradou AC | Sidi Bel Abbès |
| 15:00 | | Soccerway report | | Stadium: Stade 24 Fevrier 1956; Attendance: 0 (close doors); Referee: Redouane Necib |

| 20 February 2021 Round 14 | Paradou AC | 2–1 | Olympique de Médéa | Dar El Beïda |
| 14:30 | Boucif 46'; Messibah 72' | Soccerway report | Khalfallah 45+6' | Stadium: Omar Benrabah Stadium; Attendance: 0 (close doors); Referee: Bilal Bendjahene |

| 27 February 2021 Round 15 | MC Oran | 3–1 | Paradou AC | Oran |
| 14:30 | Mesmoudi 43'; Guenina 48', 66' | Soccerway report | Okello 85' | Stadium: Ahmed Zabana Stadium; Attendance: 0 (close doors); Referee: Abdelmoumen Touabti |

| 6 March 2021 Round 16 | Paradou AC | 2–1 | USM Alger | Dar El Beïda |
| 15:00 | Benbouali 18'; Messibah 59' (pen.) | Soccerway report | Benchaâ 56' (pen.) | Stadium: Omar Benrabah Stadium; Attendance: 0 (close doors); Referee: Mustapha Bessiri |

| 13 March 2021 Round 17 | NA Hussein Dey | 1–2 | Paradou AC | Belouizdad |
| 15:00 | Nadji 76' | Soccerway report | Benbouali 59'; Boucif 73' | Stadium: Stade 20 Août 1955; Attendance: 0 (close doors); Referee: Mehdi Abid Charef |

| 17 March 2021 Round 18 | Paradou AC | 3–0 | JS Saoura | Dar El Beïda |
| 15:00 | Bouabta 80' | Soccerway report | Messaoudi 75' (pen.); Daoud 82' | Stadium: Omar Benrabah Stadium; Attendance: 0 (close doors); Referee: Mustapha Ghorbal |
Note: On March 13, 2021 after the participation of a penalized player Oussama Meddahi against Paradou AC, JS Saoura Lost the match 3–0 and were deducted 3 points.

| 21 March 2021 Round 19 | JS Kabylie | 1–1 | Paradou AC | Tizi Ouzou |
| 15:00 | Benabdi 30' | Soccerway report | Messibah 36' | Stadium: Stade 1er Novembre 1954; Attendance: 0 (close doors); Referee: Abdelmoumen Touabti |

| 4 May 2021 Round 20 | Paradou AC | 2–0 | RC Relizane | Dar El Beïda |
| 16:00 | Messibah 47'; Kadri 69' | Soccerway report | | Stadium: Omar Benrabah Stadium; Attendance: 0 (close doors); Referee: Lahlou Benbraham |

| 16 May 2021 Round 21 | CS Constantine | 0–1 | Paradou AC | Constantine |
| 17:00 | | Soccerway report | Benbouali 35' | Stadium: Stade Ramdane Benabdelmalek; Attendance: 0 (close doors); Referee: Mohamed Saïdi |

| 26 May 2021 Round 23 | Paradou AC | 1–1 | US Biskra | Dar El Beïda |
| 17:00 | Kadri 44' | Soccerway report | Yadroudj 14' (pen.) | Stadium: Omar Benrabah Stadium; Attendance: 0 (close doors); Referee: Youcef Taieb Bouderbal |

| 30 May 2021 Round 24 | CA Bordj Bou Arreridj | 3–2 | Paradou AC | Bordj Bou Arréridj |
| 17:00 | Rahba 30' (pen.); Amriche 52'; Hammouche 87' | Soccerway report | Benayad 33'; Bouzok 60' | Stadium: Stade 20 Août 1955; Attendance: 0 (close doors); Referee: Youcef Gamouh |

| 10 June 2021 Round 25 | Paradou AC | 0–3 | ES Sétif | Dar El Beïda |
| 17:00 | | Soccerway report | Deghmoum 14'; Ghacha 40'; Amoura 58' (pen.) | Stadium: Omar Benrabah Stadium; Attendance: 0 (close doors); Referee: Lahlou Benbraham |

| 19 June 2021 Round 26 | CR Belouizdad | 1–0 | Paradou AC | Belouizdad |
| 17:00 | Bouchar 33' | Soccerway report | | Stadium: Stade 20 Août 1955; Attendance: 0 (close doors); Referee: Houssam Benyahia |

| 23 June 2021 Round 22 | MC Alger | 4–0 | Paradou AC | Algiers |
| 17:45 | Haif 46'; Diomande 49'; Hadded 59'; Brahimi 65' | Soccerway report | | Stadium: Stade du 5 Juillet; Attendance: 0 (close doors); Referee: Bilal Bendjahene |

| 27 June 2021 Round 27 | Paradou AC | 1–1 | NC Magra | Dar El Beïda |
| 17:00 | Bouzok 69' | Soccerway report | Demane 20' | Stadium: Omar Benrabah Stadium; Attendance: 0 (close doors); Referee: Mohamed Boutaraa |

| 1 July 2021 Round 28 | JSM Skikda | 0–3 | Paradou AC | Skikda |
| 17:00 | | Soccerway report | Mouali 58'; Boucif 75'; Kadri 80' | Stadium: Stade 20 Août 1955; Attendance: 0 (close doors); Referee: Abdellah Benchehida |

| 4 July 2021 Round 29 | Paradou AC | 2–3 | ASO Chlef | Dar El Beïda |
| 17:30 | Mouali 18'; Bouzok 90+1' (pen.) | Soccerway report | Bengrina 5'; Boulaouidet 23'; Bouguettaya 89' | Stadium: Omar Benrabah Stadium; Attendance: 0 (close doors); Referee: Abdelmoumen Touabti |

| 8 July 2021 Round 30 | AS Ain M'lila | 2–1 | Paradou AC | Aïn M'lila |
| 20:30 | Bitam 45'; Tiaïba 72' | Soccerway report | Benbouali 39' | Stadium: Touhami Zoubir Khelifi Stadium; Attendance: 0 (close doors); Referee: Ali Nader |

| 13 July 2021 Round 31 | Paradou AC | 1–0 | WA Tlemcen | Dar El Beïda |
| 18:00 | Messibah 25' (pen.) | Soccerway report | | Stadium: Omar Benrabah Stadium; Attendance: 0 (close doors); Referee: Redouane Necib |

| 17 July 2021 Round 32 | Paradou AC | 2–0 | USM Bel Abbès | Dar El Beïda |
| 18:00 | Mouali 45+2'; Boucif 90+1' | Soccerway report | | Stadium: Omar Benrabah Stadium; Attendance: 0 (close doors); Referee: Abderrezzak Arab |

| 23 July 2021 Round 33 | Olympique de Médéa | 1–2 | Paradou AC | Médéa |
| 18:00 | Elghomari 45+1' | Soccerway report | Bouzok 40'; Benayad 62' | Stadium: Stade Imam Lyes; Attendance: 0 (close doors); Referee: Mustapha Ghorbal |

| 27 July 2021 Round 34 | Paradou AC | 5–4 | MC Oran | Dar El Beïda |
| 17:45 | Bouguerra 9'; Zerrouki 47', 55', 68'; Boucif 88' | Soccerway report | Nekkache 72', 87'; Naâmani 84'; Khettab 90+4' | Stadium: Omar Benrabah Stadium; Referee: Abdelali Ibrir |

| 9 August 2021 Round 35 | USM Alger | 2–1 | Paradou AC | Bologhine |
| 21:00 | Zouari 9' (pen.); Opoku 90+3' | Soccerway report | Bouzok 89' | Stadium: Omar Hamadi Stadium; Attendance: 0 (close doors); Referee: Hamza Bouslimani |

| 16 August 2021 Round 36 | Paradou AC | 2–3 | NA Hussein Dey | Dar El Beïda |
| 17:30 | Zerrouki 57'; Titraoui 87' | Soccerway report | Ardji 5'; Nadji 30'; Meftah 90+3' | Stadium: Omar Benrabah Stadium; Attendance: 0 (close doors); Referee: Mohamed Boutaraa |

| 21 August 2021 Round 37 | JS Saoura | 3–1 | Paradou AC | Béchar |
| 21:00 | Amrane 6'; Saâd 45', 63' | Soccerway report | Boulebina 45+2' | Stadium: Stade 20 Août 1955; Attendance: 0 (close doors); Referee: Abdellah Benchehida |

| 24 August 2021 Round 38 | Paradou AC | 0–1 | JS Kabylie | Dar El Beïda |
| 17:30 | | Soccerway report | Houari 36' | Stadium: Omar Benrabah Stadium; Attendance: 0 (close doors); Referee: Mohamed Belkbir |

== Algerian League Cup ==
| 30 April 2021 Round of 16 | US Biskra | 0–0 (a.e.t.) (5–4 p) | Paradou AC | Biskra |
| 15:30 | | | | Stadium: Stade du 18 Février; Attendance: 0 (close doors); Referee: Abdelmoumen Touabti |
| | Penalties |
| | Boukaroum (penalty scored); Dakhia (penalty scored); Renaï (penalty scored); Lakhdari (penalty scored); Khoualed (penalty scored) | | (penalty missed) Zorgane; (penalty scored) Messibah; (penalty scored) Kadri; (penalty scored) Mouali; (penalty scored) Bouabta |
Note: Lineup for Paradou AC - Boussouf, Bouguerra, Dehiri, Chebbour, Mouali, Messibah, Zorgane, Kadri, Redjem, Benbouali, Boucif.

== Squad information ==
=== Playing statistics ===
| No. | Pos | Nat | Player | Total | | Ligue 1 | | League Cup | |
| No. | Pos | Nat | Player | Apps | Goals | Apps | Goals | Apps | Goals |
Goalkeepers
| 1 | GK | (Algeria) ALG | Mokhtar Ferrahi | 8 | 0 | 8 | 0 | 0 | 0 |
| 14 | GK | (Algeria) ALG | Kheireddine Boussouf | 11 | 0 | 10 | 0 | 1 | 0 |
| 16 | GK | (Algeria) ALG | Omar Hadji | 18 | 0 | 18 | 0 | 0 | 0 |
Defenders
| 2 | DF | (Algeria) ALG | Abdelhak Elardja | 1 | 0 | 1 | 0 | 0 | 0 |
| 5 | DF | (Algeria) ALG | Youcef Douar | 24 | 0 | 24 | 0 | 0 | 0 |
| 13 | DF | (Algeria) ALG | Juba Chirani | 2 | 0 | 2 | 0 | 0 | 0 |
| 20 | DF | (Algeria) ALG | Hamza Mouali | 34 | 5 | 33 | 5 | 1 | 0 |
| 21 | DF | (Algeria) ALG | Islam Arous | 2 | 0 | 2 | 0 | 0 | 0 |
| 22 | DF | (Algeria) ALG | Tarek Bouabta | 22 | 1 | 22 | 1 | 0 | 0 |
| 24 | DF | (Algeria) ALG | Islem Chebbour | 19 | 0 | 18 | 0 | 1 | 0 |
| 25 | DF | (Algeria) ALG | Aimen Bouguerra | 32 | 2 | 31 | 2 | 1 | 0 |
| | DF | (Algeria) ALG | Hocine Dehiri | 21 | 0 | 20 | 0 | 1 | 0 |
Midfielders
| 4 | MF | (Algeria) ALG | Tayeb Hamoudi | 4 | 0 | 4 | 0 | 0 | 0 |
| 12 | MF | (Algeria) ALG | Hicham Messiad | 15 | 0 | 15 | 0 | 0 | 0 |
| 15 | MF | (Algeria) ALG | Zakaria Messibah | 27 | 5 | 26 | 5 | 1 | 0 |
| 18 | MF | (Algeria) ALG | Abdeldjalil Tahri | 2 | 0 | 2 | 0 | 0 | 0 |
| 19 | MF | (Algeria) ALG | Mohamed Fenniri | 1 | 0 | 1 | 0 | 0 | 0 |
| 26 | MF | (Algeria) ALG | Yousri Bouzok | 23 | 5 | 23 | 5 | 0 | 0 |
| 42 | MF | (Algeria) ALG | Abdelkahar Kadri | 30 | 3 | 29 | 3 | 1 | 0 |
| 48 | MF | (Algeria) ALG | Adem Zorgane | 28 | 3 | 27 | 3 | 1 | 0 |
| | MF | (Algeria) ALG | Nour El Islam Melikchi | 2 | 0 | 2 | 0 | 0 | 0 |
Forwards
| 6 | FW | (Algeria) ALG | Abdelkader Ghorab | 17 | 0 | 17 | 0 | 0 | 0 |
| 7 | FW | (Algeria) ALG | Sid Ali Mebarki | 7 | 0 | 7 | 0 | 0 | 0 |
| 8 | FW | (Uganda) UGA | Allan Okello | 16 | 2 | 16 | 2 | 0 | 0 |
| 9 | FW | (Algeria) ALG | Riad Benayad | 14 | 2 | 14 | 2 | 0 | 0 |
| 10 | FW | (Algeria) ALG | Oussama Kismoun | 5 | 1 | 5 | 1 | 0 | 0 |
| 11 | FW | (Algeria) ALG | Ghiles Guenaoui | 5 | 2 | 5 | 2 | 0 | 0 |
| 17 | FW | (Algeria) ALG | Abderrezak Kibboua | 10 | 0 | 10 | 0 | 0 | 0 |
| 23 | FW | (Algeria) ALG | Adem Redjem | 25 | 0 | 24 | 0 | 1 | 0 |
| 27 | FW | (Algeria) ALG | Djaber Kaassis | 13 | 0 | 13 | 0 | 0 | 0 |
| 35 | FW | (Algeria) ALG | Ahmed Nadhir Benbouali | 35 | 9 | 34 | 9 | 1 | 0 |
| 99 | FW | (Algeria) ALG | Merouane Zerrouki | 16 | 4 | 16 | 4 | 0 | 0 |
| | FW | (Algeria) ALG | Aymen Zakarya Sais | 6 | 0 | 6 | 0 | 0 | 0 |
| 78 | FW | (Algeria) ALG | Yacine Titraoui | 4 | 1 | 4 | 1 | 0 | 0 |
| | FW | (Algeria) ALG | Zerroug Boucif | 24 | 7 | 23 | 7 | 1 | 0 |
Players transferred out during the season

Last updated: 24 August 2021
Source: fr.soccerway.com

=== Goalscorers ===
Includes all competitive matches. The list is sorted alphabetically by surname when total goals are equal.

| No. | Nat. | Player | Pos. | L 1 | LC | TOTAL |
|---|---|---|---|---|---|---|
| 35 | (Algeria) | Ahmed Nadhir Benbouali | FW | 9 | 0 | 9 |
| | (Algeria) | Zerroug Boucif | FW | 7 | 0 | 7 |
| 15 | (Algeria) | Zakaria Messibah | MF | 5 | 0 | 5 |
| 26 | (Algeria) | Yousri Bouzok | MF | 5 | 0 | 5 |
| 20 | (Algeria) | Hamza Mouali | DF | 5 | 0 | 5 |
| 99 | (Algeria) | Merouane Zerrouki | FW | 4 | 0 | 4 |
| 42 | (Algeria) | Abdelkahar Kadri | MF | 3 | 0 | 3 |
| 48 | (Algeria) | Adem Zorgane | MF | 3 | 0 | 3 |
| 8 | (Uganda) | Allan Okello | FW | 2 | 0 | 2 |
| 9 | (Algeria) | Riad Benayad | FW | 2 | 0 | 2 |
| 11 | (Algeria) | Ghiles Guenaoui | FW | 2 | 0 | 2 |
| 25 | (Algeria) | Aimen Bouguerra | DF | 2 | 0 | 2 |
| 10 | (Algeria) | Oussama Kismoun | FW | 1 | 0 | 1 |
| 78 | (Algeria) | Yacine Titraoui | FW | 1 | 0 | 1 |
| 22 | (Algeria) | Tarek Bouabta | DF | 1 | 0 | 1 |
| Own Goals | | | | 0 | 0 | 0 |
| Totals | | | | 53 | 0 | 53 |

== Transfers ==
=== In ===
| Date | Pos | Player | From club | Transfer fee | Source |
|---|---|---|---|---|---|
| 30 June 2020 | DM | (Algeria) Taher Benkhelifa | USM Alger | Loan Return | |
| 31 July 2020 | FW | (Algeria) Zakaria Naidji | (Portugal) Gil Vicente | Loan Return | |
| 10 September 2020 | GK | (Algeria) Omar Hadji | AS Ain M'lila | Free transfer | |

=== Out ===
| Date | Pos | Player | To club | Transfer fee | Source |
|---|---|---|---|---|---|
| 7 September 2020 | GK | (Algeria) Toufik Moussaoui | CR Belouizdad | 14,000,000 DA | |
| 19 September 2020 | DM | (Algeria) Taher Benkhelifa | USM Alger | Undisclosed | |
| 29 September 2020 | CB | (Algeria) Mustapha Bouchina | USM Alger | 11,000,000 DA | |
| 29 November 2020 | DF | (Algeria) Sabri Cheraitia | (Tunisia) CS Sfaxien | Loan for one year | |
| 29 November 2020 | FW | (Algeria) Zakaria Mansouri | (Tunisia) CS Sfaxien | Loan for one year | |
| 31 January 2021 | RB | (Algeria) Haithem Loucif | USM Alger | Undisclosed | |
| 31 January 2021 | ST | (Algeria) Zakaria Naidji | USM Alger | Loan for six months | |
