= 2024–25 ES Sétif season =

ES Sétif
2024–25 season
- Owner: Sonelgaz
- President: Abdelhamid Rais
- Head coach: Rédha Bendris (from 10 July 2024) (until 21 January 2025); Nabil Kouki (from 21 January 2025)
- Stadium: 8 May 1945 Stadium
- Ligue 1: 6th
- Algerian Cup: Quarter-finals
- Top goalscorer: League: Six players (3 goals); All: Six players (3 goals)
Home colours	Away colours	Third colours

The 2024–25 season, is ES Sétif's 54th and the club's 23rd consecutive season in the top flight of Algerian football. In addition to the domestic league, ES Sétif are participating in the Algerian Cup. On June 27, 2024, The federal office approved the calendar for the 2024–25 Ligue 1 season with the aim of ending on May 31, 2025. The first round is scheduled for September 14, this delay is motivated both by an extended end of the 2023–24 season but also by the holding of early presidential elections which will take place on September 7, 2024. However, the Ligue de Football Professionnel decided to postpone the start of the Ligue 1 by a week, on September 21.

== Review ==
=== Background ===
On July 9, 2024, ES Sétif announced in a press release that it was parting ways with its coach Ammar Souayah. Following this termination of contract, ESS sports director Abdelkarim Bira wanted to honor the Tunisian coach who took over at the head of the club last February. The next day, ES Sétif signed a contract with the former coach of ES Mostaganem, Reda Bendriss. His arrival was announced a long time ago, Where Bendriss signed for two seasons. It's just a return home for the Sétif native who was a player for ten years at ES Sétif before spending a spell as assistant coach and then interim at the helm of ES Sétif in 2021–22. On July 19, after a disagreement with the general manager Abdelkrim Bira, Malik Zorgane and Mourad Delhoum leave the administrative staff of ES Sétif. The latter have visibly given in to public pressure, which is demanding big names in this summer transfer window. All their proposals to strengthen the squad of the first team were rejected by the club's management, in particular the Nigerian attackers Tosin, Mrezigue and Ghacha. Not wanting their names to be associated with a failed casting, the two men preferred to withdraw.

On January 2, 2025, Abdelkrim Bira, technical and sports director, presented his resignation after eight tumultuous months at the head of the club. A decision that comes in a context of increased tensions and recurring obstacles. In a statement to the press, Bira explained the reasons for his departure, citing unbearable pressure, threats to his physical safety, as well as an attack on his dignity. The club's owner Sonelgaz, has accepted the resignation and is planning a meeting to appoint his successor.

== Squad list ==
Players and squad numbers last updated on 5 February 2025.
Note: Flags indicate national team as has been defined under FIFA eligibility rules. Players may hold more than one non-FIFA nationality.

No.	Nat.	Position	Name	Date of birth (age)	Signed from
Goalkeepers
1	(Algeria)	Tarek Bousseder	GK	28 November 2000 (aged 23)	(Algeria) ES Ben Aknoun
23	(Algeria)	Ala Eddine Bouaoune	GK	10 November 2002 (aged 21)	(Algeria) Reserve team
25	(Algeria)	Zakaria Saidi	GK	5 August 1996 (aged 28)	(Algeria) JS Saoura
Defenders
2	(Algeria)	Drice Chaabi (C.)	CB	20 September 1997 (aged 26)	(Belgium) Francs Borains
3	(Algeria)	Abdelmoumen Chikhi	LB	29 February 1996 (aged 28)	(Algeria) CR Belouizdad
5	(Algeria)	Youcef Douar	CB	15 September 1997 (aged 27)	(Algeria) Paradou AC
6	(Algeria)	Houari Ferhani	LB	11 February 1993 (aged 31)	(Morocco) Olympic Safi
16	(Mali)	Moriba Diarra	CB	30 December 1995 (aged 28)	(Mali) Stade Malien
20	(Algeria)	Imad Reguieg	RB	2 June 2002 (aged 22)	(Algeria) MC Oran
22	(Algeria)	Oussama Gattal	RB	14 May 1997 (aged 27)	(Algeria) JS Kabylie
27	(Algeria)	Imadeddine Boubekeur	CB	10 July 1995 (aged 29)	(Kuwait) Al-Arabi SC
43	(Algeria)	Abderrazak Mohra	CB	5 January 2004 (aged 20)	(Algeria) Reserve team
Midfielders
7	(Algeria)	Salah Bouchama	AM	22 October 2001 (aged 22)	(Algeria) Reserve team
8	(Algeria)	Akram Djahnit	AM	3 April 1991 (aged 33)	(Algeria) USM Alger
10	(Burkina Faso)	Clément Pitroipa	AM	23 November 1993 (aged 30)	(Burkina Faso) AS Douanes
12	(Nigeria)	Augustine Oladapo	AM	27 July 1995 (aged 29)	(Democratic Republic of the Congo) TP Mazembe
14	(Benin)	Rodrigue Kossi Fiogbé	DM	31 December 1999 (aged 24)	(Saudi Arabia) Al-Taraji Club
18	(Algeria)	Taher Benkhelifa	DM	10 June 1994 (aged 30)	(Algeria) USM Alger
24	(Algeria)	Amir Nouri	CM	10 July 1994 (aged 30)	Unattached
Forwards
11	(Algeria)	Mohamed Messaoud Salem	LW	3 July 2003 (aged 21)	(Algeria) Reserve team
15	(Algeria)	Karim Bouhmidi	LW	26 May 1998 (aged 26)	(Luxembourg) Swift Hesperange
17	(Algeria)	Mohamed Boukerma	RW	5 August 2001 (aged 23)	(Algeria) Paradou AC
19	(Nigeria)	Kingsley Eduwo	ST	19 June 1996 (aged 28)	(Tunisia) Club Africain
21	(Algeria)	Abderrahmane Bacha	SS	21 December 1999 (aged 24)	(Algeria) USM Alger

== Transfers ==
=== In ===
==== Summer ====
Date	Pos	Player	Moving from	Fee	Source
1 July 2024	GK	(Algeria) Tarek Bousseder	ES Ben Aknoun	Free transfer	
1 July 2024	CB	(Algeria) Youcef Douar	Paradou AC	Free transfer	
11 July 2024	ST	(Algeria) Abdel-Touab Ali Hadji	ES Mostaganem	Free transfer	
21 July 2024	MF	(Algeria) Akram Djahnit	USM Alger	Free transfer	
23 July 2024	RB	(Algeria) Oussama Gatal	JS Kabylie	Free transfer	
1 August 2024	LB	(Algeria) Houari Ferhani	(Morocco) Olympic Safi	Free transfer	
4 August 2024	AM	(Nigeria) Augustine Oladapo	(Democratic Republic of the Congo) TP Mazembe	Free transfer	
3 September 2024	FW	(Algeria) Abderrahmane Bacha	USM Alger	Free transfer	
10 September 2024	CB	(Algeria) Imadeddine Boubekeur	(Kuwait) Al-Arabi SC	Free transfer	
10 September 2024	DM	(Benin) Rodrigue Kossi Fiogbé	(Saudi Arabia) Al-Taraji Club	Free transfer	
10 September 2024	RW	(Algeria) Mohamed Boukerma	Paradou AC	Free transfer	

==== Winter ====
Date	Pos	Player	Moving to	Fee	Source
21 January 2025	ST	(Algeria) Karim Bouhmidi	(Luxembourg) Swift Hesperange	Undisclosed	
25 January 2025	ST	(Nigeria) Kingsley Eduwo	(Tunisia) Club Africain	Undisclosed	
26 January 2025	AM	(Burkina Faso) Clément Pitroipa	(Burkina Faso) AS Douanes	Undisclosed	

=== Out ===
==== Winter ====
Date	Pos	Player	Moving to	Fee	Source
14 January 2025	ST	(Algeria) Abdouel Ali Hadji	Unattached	Free transfer (Released)	
16 January 2025	AM	(Mali) Salam Jiddou	Unattached	Free transfer (Released)	

== Pre-season and friendlies ==
23 August 2024 Friendly	USM Alger	1–1	ES Sétif	Tabarka, Tunisia
17:30 UTC+1	Belkacemi 39' (pen.)	Report	Djahnit (?)	Stadium: La Cigale Tabarka Sport

== Competitions ==
=== Overview ===
Competition	Record								Started round	Final position / round	First match	Last match
Competition	G	W	D	L	GF	GA	GD	Win %	Started round	Final position / round	First match	Last match
Ligue 1	30	11	8	11	21	24	−3	36.67	—N/a	6th	19 September 2024	20 June 2025
Algerian Cup	4	3	0	1	4	1	+3	75.00	Round of 64	Quarter-finals	3 January 2025	27 March 2025
Total	34	14	8	12	25	25	+0	41.18				

Updated to match played 20 June 2025
Source: Competitions

=== Ligue 1 ===
==== League table ====
Pos	Team	Pld	W	D	L	GF	GA	GD	Pts	Qualification or relegation
4	JS Saoura	30	12	7	11	34	36	−2	43	
5	Paradou AC	30	11	8	11	41	39	+2	41	
6	ES Sétif	30	11	8	11	21	24	−3	41	
7	USM Alger	30	10	10	10	26	26	0	40	Qualification for Confederation Cup (Note: USMA Alger qualified for the 2025–26 CAF Confederation Cup by winning the 2024–25 Algerian Cup)
8	MC Oran	30	12	4	14	32	33	−1	40	

Source: the-sports.org
Rules for classification: 1) points; 2) head-to-head points; 3) head-to-head goal difference; 4) goal difference; 5) total goals; 6) fairplay ranking; 7) playoff.

==== Results summary ====
Overall								Home						Away					
Pld	W	D	L	GF	GA	GD	Pts	W	D	L	GF	GA	GD	W	D	L	GF	GA	GD
30	11	8	11	21	24	−3	41	8	4	3	12	7	+5	3	4	8	9	17	−8

Last updated: 20 June 2025.
Source: Competitive matches

==== Results by round ====
Round	1	2	3	4	5	6	7	8	9	10	11	12	13	14	15	16	17	18	19	20	21	22	23	24	25	26	27	28	29	30
Ground	H	A	H	A	H	A	H	A	H	A	H	A	H	H	A	A	H	A	H	A	H	A	H	A	H	A	H	A	A	H
Result	W	D	D	L	W	L	W	L	L	W	D	W	D	D	D	L	W	D	W	L	L	W	W	D	W	L	L	L	L	W
Position	6	5	6	8	6	8	7	7	11	9	9	6	6	7	7	8	7	7	5	7	9	6	4	4	4	5	6	7	8	6

Updated to match(es) played on 20 June 2025. Source: Competitive matches
A = Away; H = Home; W = Win; D = Draw; L = Loss

==== Matches ====
The league fixtures were announced on 11 July 2024.

All times are local, WAT (UTC+1).

Win Draw Loss Postponed

19 September 2024 Round 1	ES Sétif	1–0	MC El Bayadh	Sétif
18:00	Djahnit 11' (pen.)	Report		Stadium: 8 May 1945 Stadium; Referee: Anes Azrine; VAR: Lahlou Benbraham

27 September 2024 Round 2	CR Belouizdad	0–0	ES Sétif	Algiers
16:00		Report		Stadium: 20 August 1955 Stadium; Referee: Houssam Benyahia

4 October 2024 Round 3	ES Sétif	0–0	NC Magra	Sétif
18:00		Report		Stadium: 8 May 1945 Stadium; Referee: Youcef Gamouh; VAR: Lotfi Bekouassa

11 October 2024 Round 4	JS Saoura	3–2	ES Sétif	Béchar
16:00	Souibaâh 7'; Belmiloud 45+4'; Bentaleb 86'	Report	Chaabi 38' (pen.), 66'	Stadium: 20 August 1955 Stadium; Referee: Youcef Taieb Bouderbal

18 October 2024 Round 5	ES Sétif	1–0	ES Mostaganem	Sétif
18:00	Mouley 68' (pen.)	Report		Stadium: 8 May 1945 Stadium; Attendance: 0 (close doors); Referee: Rafik Aouina

25 October 2024 Round 6	CS Constantine	2–1	ES Sétif	Constantine
16:00	Tahar 6'; Belhocini 40'	Report	Bacha 21'	Stadium: Chahid Hamlaoui Stadium; Attendance: 0 (close doors); Referee: Nabil Boukhalfa

2 November 2024 Round 7	ES Sétif	1–0	ASO Chlef	Sétif
17:45	Boubekeur 17'	Report		Stadium: 8 May 1945 Stadium; Referee: Mustapha Ghorbal

7 November 2024 Round 8	MC Oran	1–0	ES Sétif	Bir El Djir
19:30	Aguieb 61'	Report		Stadium: Miloud Hadefi Stadium; Referee: Mehdi Oukil; VAR: Anes Azrine

23 November 2024 Round 10	Olympique Akbou	0–1	ES Sétif	Béjaïa
15:00		Report	Bacha 48'	Stadium: Maghrebi Unity Stadium; Referee: Anes Azrine; VAR: Akram Mechairia

1 December 2024 Round 11	ES Sétif	0–0	MC Alger	Sétif
17:30		Report		Stadium: 8 May 1945 Stadium; Referee: Bilel Soltani; VAR: Lahlou Benbraham

7 December 2024 Round 12	USM Khenchela	2–3	ES Sétif	Khenchela
15:00	Aiboud 45+1'; Djaouchi 84'	Report	Boubekeur 55'; Chaabi 77'; Gattal 90+2'	Stadium: Amar Hamam Stadium; Referee: Houssam Benyahia

13 December 2024 Round 13	ES Sétif	2–2	JS Kabylie	Sétif
17:00	Diarra 45+1'; Chaabi 69'	Report	Madani 67' (pen.); Sarr 90+1'	Stadium: 8 May 1945 Stadium; Attendance: 0 (close doors); Referee: Akram Mechairia; VAR: Fateh Harkat

17 December 2024 Round 9	ES Sétif	1–2	Paradou AC	Sétif
17:30	Bacha 62'	Report	Kohili 6'; Boulbina 70'	Stadium: 8 May 1945 Stadium; Referee: Yahia Dehar

21 December 2024 Round 14	ES Sétif	1–1	USM Alger	Sétif
17:00	Bouchama 90+10'	Report	Ghacha 30'	Stadium: 8 May 1945 Stadium; Referee: Nabil Boukhalfa; VAR: Lahlou Benbraham

27 December 2024 Round 15	US Biskra	0–0	ES Sétif	Biskra
16:00		Report		Stadium: 18 February Stadium; Referee: Youcef Taieb Bouderbal; VAR: Fateh Harkat

11 February 2025 Round 16	MC El Bayadh	1–0	ES Sétif	El Bayadh
15:00	Benamrane 90+5'	Report		Stadium: Zakaria Medjdoub Stadium; Attendance: 0 (close doors); Referee: Mehdi Oukil

20 February 2025 Round 17	ES Sétif	1–0	CR Belouizdad	Sétif
16:45	Eduwo 21'	Report		Stadium: 8 May 1945 Stadium; Attendance: 0 (close doors); Referee: Mustapha Ghorbal; VAR: Alaa Bouab

26 February 2025 Round 18	NC Magra	0–0	ES Sétif	Magra
15:30		Report		Stadium: Boucheligue Brothers Stadium; Referee: Alaa Bouab

7 March 2025 Round 19	ES Sétif	1–0	JS Saoura	Sétif
22:00	Eduwo 90+4'	Report		Stadium: 8 May 1945 Stadium; Attendance: 0 (close doors); Referee: Fateh Harkat; VAR: Mehdi Oukil

14 March 2025 Round 20	ES Mostaganem	1–0	ES Sétif	Mostaganem
22:00	Hitala 52'	Report		Stadium: Mohamed Bensaïd Stadium; Attendance: 0 (close doors); Referee: Mehdi Oukil

11 April 2025 Round 22	ASO Chlef	0–1	ES Sétif	Chlef
16:00		Report	Eduwo 6' (pen.)	Stadium: Mohamed Boumezrag Stadium; Referee: Nabil Boukhalfa; VAR: Rafik Aouina

18 April 2025 Round 23	ES Sétif	1–0	MC Oran	Sétif
18:00	Djahnit 85' (pen.)	Report		Stadium: 8 May 1945 Stadium; Referee: Alaa Bouab; VAR: Redouane Allou

24 April 2025 Round 24	Paradou AC	0–0	ES Sétif	Baraki
18:00		Report		Stadium: Nelson Mandela Stadium; Referee: Akram Mechairia; VAR: Youcef Taieb Bouderbal

11 May 2025 Round 25	ES Sétif	1–0	Olympique Akbou	Sétif
17:00	Boukerma 60'	Report		Stadium: 8 May 1945 Stadium; Referee: Haitham Ghouti; VAR: afik Aouina

15 May 2025 Round 21	ES Sétif	0–1	CS Constantine	Sétif
18:00		Report	Benchaâ 53'	Stadium: 8 May 1945 Stadium; Referee: Anes Azrine; VAR: Redouane Allou

19 May 2025 Round 26	MC Alger	4–1	ES Sétif	Algiers
17:00	Bangoura 20', 71'; Benkhemassa 68'; Bouras 78'	Report	Bouchama 49'	Stadium: Stade du 5 Juillet; Referee: Yahia Dehar; VAR: Lotfi Bekouassa

25 May 2025 Round 27	ES Sétif	0–1	USM Khenchela	Sétif
17:00		Report	Oukil 6'	Stadium: 8 May 1945 Stadium; Referee: Mustapha Ghorbal; VAR: Anes Azrine

12 June 2025 Round 28	JS Kabylie	2–0	ES Sétif	Tizi Ouzou
21:00	Boudebouz 52'; Boualia 64'	Report		Stadium: Hocine Aït Ahmed Stadium; Referee: Rafik Aouina; VAR: Redouane Allou

16 June 2025 Round 29	USM Alger	1–0	ES Sétif	Algiers
21:00	Ghacha 85'	Report		Stadium: Stade du 5 Juillet; Referee: Akram Mechairia; VAR: Haitham Ghouti

20 June 2025 Round 30	ES Sétif	1–0	US Biskra	Sétif
17:00	Djahnit 23'	Report		Stadium: 8 May 1945 Stadium; Referee: Yahia Dehar; VAR: Anes Azrine

=== Algerian Cup ===
3 January 2025 Round of 64	MC El Eulma	0–2	ES Sétif	El Eulma
16:00		Report	Boukerma 34' (pen.); Bouguerri 89'	Stadium: Messaoud Zeghar Stadium; Referee: Said Aouina

10 January 2025 Round of 32	ES Sétif	1–0	JS Djijel	Sétif
16:00	Boukerma 90+7' (pen.)	Report		Stadium: 8 May 1945 Stadium; Referee: Ayoub Belhachemi

6 February 2025 Round of 16	A El Eulma	0–1	ES Sétif	El Eulma
17:00		Report	Bouhmidi 42'	Stadium: Messaoud Zeghar Stadium; Referee: Mohamed Bouteraa

27 March 2025 Quarter-finals	MC El Bayadh	1–0 (a.e.t.)	ES Sétif	Baraki
22:00	Boudechicha 102'	Report		Stadium: Nelson Mandela Stadium; Referee: Anes Azrine; VAR: Redouane Allou

== Squad information ==
=== Appearances and goals ===
As of 20 June 2025

No.	Pos	Player	Nat	Ligue 1			Algerian Cup			Total		
No.	Pos	Player	Nat	App	St	G	App	St	G	App	St	G
Goalkeepers
1	GK	Tarek Bousseder	(Algeria)	27	27	0	4	4	0	31	31	0
23	GK	Ala Eddine Bouaoune	(Algeria)	0	0	0	0	0	0	0	0	0
25	GK	Zakaria Saidi	(Algeria)	4	3	0	0	0	0	4	3	0
Defenders
2	CB	Drice Chaabi	(Algeria)	25	25	3	4	3	0	29	28	3
3	LB	Abdelmoumen Chikhi	(Algeria)	19	13	0	4	4	0	23	17	0
5	CB	Youcef Douar	(Algeria)	19	18	0	3	3	0	22	21	0
6	LB	Houari Ferhani	(Algeria)	25	18	0	2	2	0	27	20	0
16	CB	Moriba Diarra	(Mali)	22	21	1	4	1	0	26	22	1
20	RB	Imad Reguieg	(Algeria)	11	4	0	2	1	0	13	5	0
22	RB	Oussama Gatal	(Algeria)	20	19	1	3	3	0	23	22	1
27	CB	Imadeddine Boubekeur	(Algeria)	27	24	3	3	2	0	30	26	3
43	CB	Abderrazak Mohra	(Algeria)	12	4	0	0	0	0	12	4	0
Midfielders
7	AM	Salah Bouchama	(Algeria)	25	17	3	3	3	0	28	20	3
8	AM	Akram Djahnit	(Algeria)	12	8	3	0	0	0	12	8	3
10	AM	Clément Pitroipa	(Burkina Faso)	15	11	0	2	1	0	17	12	0
12	AM	Augustine Oladapo	(Nigeria)	26	25	0	4	4	0	30	29	0
14	DM	Rodrigue Kossi Fiogbé	(Benin)	19	10	0	4	3	0	23	13	0
18	DM	Taher Benkhelifa	(Algeria)	18	16	0	2	2	0	20	18	0
24	CM	Amir Nouri	(Algeria)	5	3	0	0	0	0	5	3	0
32	DM	Bassem Mechaar	(Algeria)	3	1	0	0	0	0	3	1	0
Forwards
9	ST	Kingsley Eduwo	(Nigeria)	13	9	3	2	1	0	15	10	3
11	LW	Mohamed Messaoud Salem	(Algeria)	16	8	0	3	2	0	19	10	0
15	ST	Karim Bouhmidi	(Algeria)	12	6	0	2	1	1	14	7	1
17	RW	Mohamed Boukerma	(Algeria)	20	14	0	3	2	2	23	16	2
21	SS	Abderrahmane Bacha	(Algeria)	21	11	3	3	2	0	24	13	3
Players transferred out during the season
~~10~~	AM	Salam Jiddou	(Mali)	7	1	0	1	0	0	8	1	0
~~19~~	ST	Abdouel Ali Hadji	(Algeria)	7	5	0	0	0	0	7	5	0
~~26~~	RW	Abdelaziz Moulay	(Algeria)	12	9	1	1	1	0	13	10	1
~~88~~	LW	Youcef Aouissi	(Algeria)	3	0	0	0	0	0	3	0	0
Total				30		21	4		4	34		25

Last updated: 20 June 2025
Source: mondefootball.fr

=== Goalscorers ===
As of 20 June 2025

Includes all competitive matches.

No.	Nat.	Player	Pos.	L1	AC	TOTAL
8	(Algeria)	Akram Djahnit	AM	3	0	3
9	(Nigeria)	Kingsley Eduwo	ST	3	0	3
2	(Algeria)	Drice Chaabi	CB	3	0	3
27	(Algeria)	Imadeddine Boubekeur	CB	3	0	3
7	(Algeria)	Salah Bouchama	AM	3	0	3
21	(Algeria)	Abderrahmane Bacha	SS	3	0	3
17	(Algeria)	Mohamed Boukerma	RW	0	2	2
15	(Algeria)	Karim Bouhmidi	ST	0	1	1
26	(Algeria)	Abdelaziz Moulay	RW	1	0	1
16	(Mali)	Moriba Diarra	CB	1	0	1
22	(Algeria)	Oussama Gatal	RB	1	0	1
	(Algeria)	Boukri		0	1	1
Own Goals				0	0	0
Totals				21	4	25

=== Clean sheets ===
As of 20 June 2025

					Clean sheets		
No.	Nat	Name	GP	GA	L 1	AC	Total
1	(Algeria)	Tarek Bousseder	31	24	13	3	16
23	(Algeria)	Ala Eddine Bouaoune	0	0	0	0	0
25	(Algeria)	Zakaria Saidi	4	1	3	0	3
		TOTALS		25	16	3	19
