= Adel Belkacem Bouzida =

Algerian footballer (born 2002)

Personal information
- Full name: Adel Amar Belkacem Bouzida
- Date of birth: 28 February 2002 (age 24)
- Position: Forward

Team information
- Current team: CA Batna
- Number: 25

Youth career
- –2021: Paradou AC

Senior career*
Years	Team	Apps	(Gls)
2021–2026	Paradou AC	35	(7)
2024	→ USM Alger (loan)	1	(0)
2026–	CA Batna	0	(0)

International career
2018	Algeria U17		
2020	Algeria U20		
- * Club domestic league appearances and goals as of 5 February 2026

Adel Amar Belkacem Bouzida (Arabic: عادل عمار بلقاسم بوزيدة; born 28 February 2002) is an Algerian footballer who plays as a forward for CA Batna.

== Club career ==
In October 2019, Belkacem Bouzida was included in The Guardian's "Next Generation 2019", highlighting the best young players worldwide. On 25 January 2024, Bouzida signed one-year loan contract with USM Alger.

== International career ==
Belkacem Bouzida was called up to the Algeria national under-17 football team in 2018. This was followed up with a call up to the under-20 side in 2020.

== Career statistics ==
=== Club ===
As of 14 June 2024

Appearances and goals by club, season and competition
Club	Season	League			Cup		Continental		Other		Total	
Club	Season	Division	Apps	Goals	Apps	Goals	Apps	Goals	Apps	Goals	Apps	Goals
Paradou AC	2021–22	Ligue 1	1	0	0	0	0	0	0	0	1	0
Paradou AC	2022–23	Ligue 1	19	6	1	0	0	0	0	0	20	6
Paradou AC	2023–24	Ligue 1	8	1	0	0	0	0	0	0	8	1
Total			28	7	1	0	0	0	0	0	29	7
USM Alger	2023–24	Ligue 1	1	0	3	0	0	0	0	0	4	0
Total			1	0	3	0	0	0	0	0	4	0
Career total			29	7	4	0	0	0	0	0	33	7
