= Adil Boulbina =

Algerian footballer (born 2003)

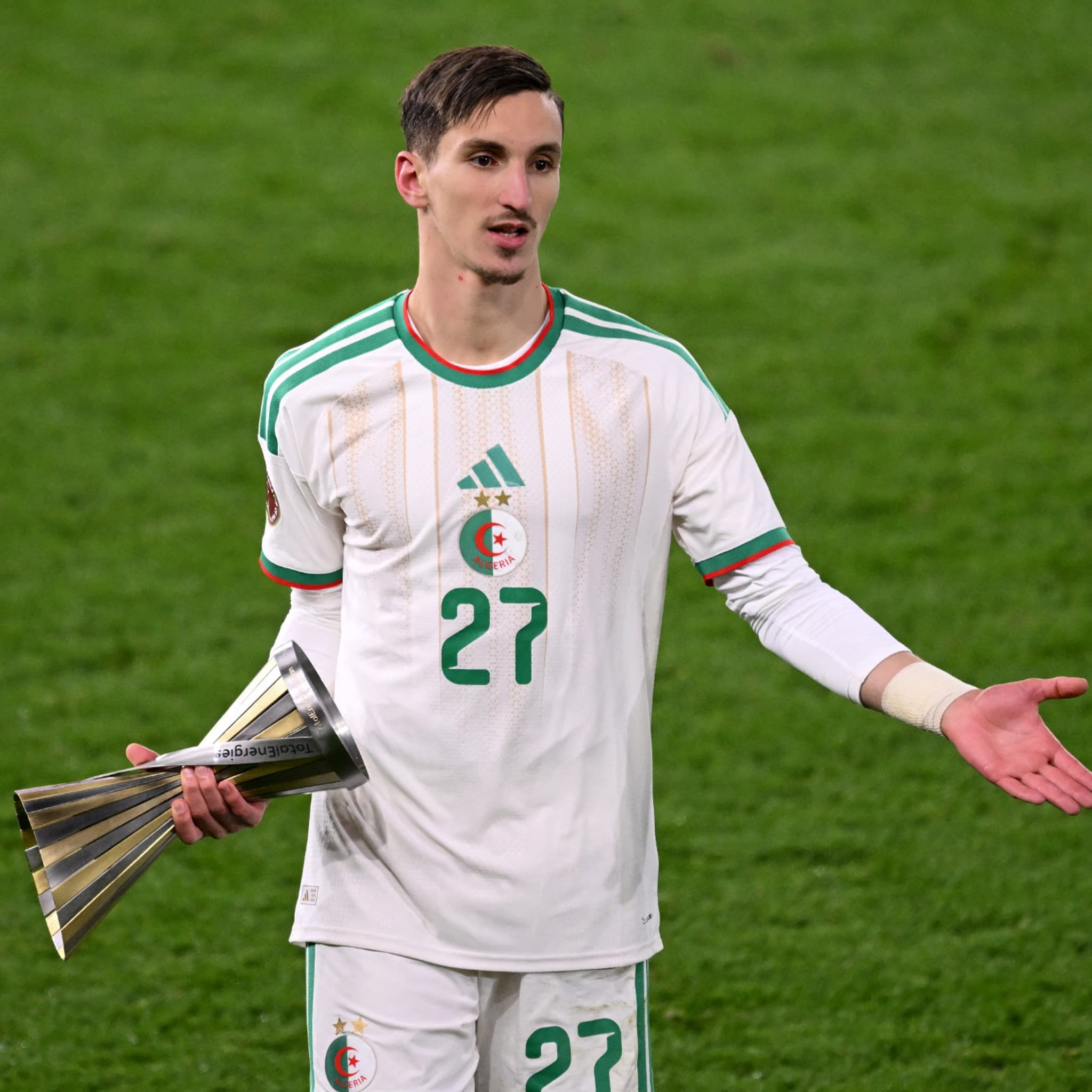
- Boulbina with Algeria in 2025

Personal information
- Full name: Adil Boulbina
- Date of birth: 2 May 2003 (age 23)
- Place of birth: El Milia, Algeria
- Height: 1.83 m (6 ft 0 in)
- Position: Forward

Team information
- Current team: Al-Diriyah
- Number: 10

Youth career
- NRHI El Ancer
- CRB El Kennar
- ASSW Jijel
- Paradou

Senior career*
Years	Team	Apps	(Gls)
2020–2025	Paradou	106	(36)
2025–2026	Al Duhail	19	(5)
2026–	Al-Diriyah	3	(2)

International career^{‡}
2021–2023	Algeria U20	7	(2)
2022–2025	Algeria U23	5	(3)
2021–2025	Algeria A'	10	(5)
2025–	Algeria	16	(2)
- * Club domestic league appearances and goals as of 9 September 2026 ‡ National team caps and goals as of 29 September 2026

Adil Boulbina (Arabic: عادل بولبينة; born May 2, 2003) is an Algerian professional footballer who plays as forward for Saudi Pro League club Al-Diriyah and the Algeria national team.

== Club career ==
=== Al Duhail ===
On 14 June 2025, Boulbina, the top scorer of the 2024–25 Algerian Ligue 1 season, flew to Doha to finalize his transfer to Al Duhail. Boulbina was accompanied by Sofiane Zetchi, son of Paradou AC president Kheiredine Zetchi.

The contract, set to last five years, is expected to be signed on 16 June 2025, following the mandatory medical examinations. The transfer fee is estimated at over €4 million, which would mark a record for a player transferred from the Algerian league, surpassing Hicham Boudaoui’s move to OGC Nice in 2019.

A clause also guarantees 25% of any future transfer fee to Paradou. He reportedly turned down offers from other clubs, such as Hull City and Zamalek, considering Al Duhail’s offer to be more beneficial both sportingly and financially.

On 19 June 2025, Boulbina has signed a 5 year deal with Al-Duhail SC, despite European interest. The move was reportedly facilitated by coach Djamel Belmadi, who promised a 1 or 2 season stint before a transfer to Braga, a club linked to Al Duhail’s Qatari investors. The long contract helps the Qatari club protect its investment.

On 24 November 2025, he scored a hat-trick in the 2025–26 AFC Champions League Elite helping his team to a 4–2 win over Saudi club Al Ittihad.

=== Al-Diriyah ===
On 22 August 2026, Boulbina joined newly promoted Saudi Pro League club Al-Diriyah.

== International career ==
Boulbina was called up by coach Madjid Bougherra to join the Algeria A' national football team. Boulbina participate in the preparatory training camp ahead of the friendly match against Rwanda, scheduled for June 9, 2025, at Mustapha Tchaker Stadium.

Boulbina stood out by scoring the opening goal of the match, confirming his good form with the local national team. A regular call-up for the Algeria A' squad, Boulbina is considered one of the promising talents of Algerian football.

In November 2025, he was called up to the national team for the 2025 FIFA Arab Cup. In December 2025, he was named in the Algerian squad for the 2025 Africa Cup of Nations. On 6 January 2026, he scored the only goal in a 1–0 win after extra time over DR Congo in the round of 16 of the African competition. On 31 May 2026, Boulbina was named in Vladimir Petković's 26-man Algeria squad for the 2026 FIFA World Cup.

== Career statistics ==
=== Club ===
As of 12 June 2025

Appearances and goals by club, season and competition
Club	Season	League			National cup		Continental		Other		Total	
Club	Season	Division	Apps	Goals	Apps	Goals	Apps	Goals	Apps	Goals	Apps	Goals
Paradou	2020–21	Algerian Ligue 1	2	1	—		—		—		2	1
Paradou	2021–22	Algerian Ligue 1	25	3	—		—		—		25	3
Paradou	2022–23	Algerian Ligue 1	23	2	2	0	—		—		25	2
Paradou	2023–24	Algerian Ligue 1	27	9	2	1	—		—		29	10
Paradou	2024–25	Algerian Ligue 1	25	20	2	0	—		—		27	20
Paradou	Total		102	35	6	1	—		—		108	36
Career total			102	35	6	1	0	0	0	0	108	36

=== International ===
Scores and results list Algeria's goal tally first, score column indicates score after each Boulbina goal.

List of international goals scored by Adil Boulbina
No.	Date	Venue	Opponent	Score	Result	Competition
1	9 May 2025	19 May 1956 Stadium, Annaba, Algeria	Gambia	2–0	3–0	2024 African Nations Championship qualification
2	9 May 2025	19 May 1956 Stadium, Annaba, Algeria	Gambia	3–0	3–0	2024 African Nations Championship qualification
3	6 December 2025	Khalifa International Stadium, Al Rayyan, Qatar	Bahrain	2–1	5–1	2025 FIFA Arab Cup
4	6 December 2025	Khalifa International Stadium, Al Rayyan, Qatar	Bahrain	5–1	5–1	2025 FIFA Arab Cup
5	12 December 2025	Al Bayt Stadium, Al Khor, Qatar	United Arab Emirates	1–0	1–1 (a.e.t.) (6–7 p)	2025 FIFA Arab Cup
6	6 January 2026	Moulay Hassan Stadium, Rabat, Morocco	DR Congo	1–0	1–0 (a.e.t.)	2025 Africa Cup of Nations
7	29 September 2026	Intwari Stadium, Bujumbura, Burundi	Burundi	2–2	2–2	2027 Africa Cup of Nations qualification
