= Hocine Dehiri =

Algerian footballer (born 2000)

Personal information
- Full name: Hocine Dehiri
- Date of birth: 16 September 2000 (age 26)
- Place of birth: Sidi M'Hamed, Algeria
- Height: 1.86 m (6 ft 1 in)
- Position: Centre-back

Team information
- Current team: Al Ahli SC
- Number: 3

Youth career
- –2020: Paradou AC

Senior career*
Years	Team	Apps	(Gls)
2020–2024	Paradou AC	57	(0)
2023–2024	→ USM Alger (loan)	27	(1)
2024–2026	USM Alger	25	(1)
2025	→ Qadsia SC (loan)		
2026–	Al Ahli SC	0	(0)
- * Club domestic league appearances and goals as of 06 September 2026

Hocine Dehiri (Arabic: حسين دهيري; born 16 September 2000) is an Algerian footballer who plays for Al Ahli SC.

== Career ==
=== USM Alger ===
On 1 August 2023, Hocine Dehiri joined USM Alger from Paradou AC on a one-season loan. The 22-year-old centre-back was signed to strengthen the defence of the team managed by Abdelhak Benchikha. On 15 September 2023, Dehiri won the CAF Super Cup with USM Alger after the club defeated Al Ahly. Although he did not feature in the match, he won his first title with the club.

In January 2025, Hocine Dehiri joined Kuwaiti club Qadsia SC on loan until the end of the season, he initially joined USM Alger on a season-long loan in August 2023 before the club exercised its purchase option in June 2024 and signed him to a contract running until 2027. During the first half of the season, Dehiri saw limited playing time under head coach Nabil Maâloul, making eight appearances in all competitions, including one start. His loan move to Al-Qadisiya was intended to provide him with more regular first-team football.

After returning from his loan spell, Dehiri became an important part of the USM Alger squad, featuring regularly under both Benchikha and Lamine N'Diaye. His performances contributed to the club winning two titles. The first was the Algerian Cup, following a victory over CR Belouizdad in the final. The second, and most important title of his career, was the CAF Confederation Cup, which USM Alger won against Zamalek SC after a 8–7 victory on penalties.

=== Al Ahli SC Tripoli ===
On 28 July 2026, USM Alger announced the permanent transfer of Hocine Dehiri to Libyan club Al Ahli SC. In an official statement, the club praised his dedication and wished him success in the next stage of his career.

== Career statistics ==
=== Club ===
As of 10 September 2026

Club	Season	League			Cup		Continental		Other		Total	
Club	Season	Division	Apps	Goals	Apps	Goals	Apps	Goals	Apps	Goals	Apps	Goals
Paradou AC	2020–21	Ligue 1	20	0	—		—		1 (Note: All appearance(s) in Algerian League Cup)	0	21	0
Paradou AC	2021–22	Ligue 1	23	0	—		—		—		23	0
Paradou AC	2022–23	Ligue 1	13	1	—		—		—		13	1
Paradou AC	Total		56	0	—		—		1	0	57	0
USM Alger (loan)	2023–24	Ligue 1	27	1	4	0	8 (Note: All appearance(s) in CAF Confederation Cup)	0	—		39	1
USM Alger	2024–25	Ligue 1	6	0	—		2	0	—		8	0
USM Alger	2025–26	Ligue 1	20	1	6	0	14	0	1 (Note: All appearances in Algerian Super Cup)	0	41	1
USM Alger	Total		53	2	8	1	24	0	1	0	88	2
Al Ahli SC	2026–27	LPL	0	0	—		1	1	—		1	1
Career total			109	2	10	0	25	1	2	0	146	3

== Honours ==
USM Alger

- Algerian Cup: 2025–26
- CAF Super Cup: 2023
- CAF Confederation Cup: 2025–26
