= Juba Chirani =

Algerian footballer (born 1998)

Personal information
- Full name: Juba Chirani
- Date of birth: 4 January 1998 (age 28)
- Place of birth: Tizi Ouzou, Algeria
- Position: Left back

Team information
- Current team: JS Azazga
- Number: 3

Youth career
- –2017: Paradou AC

Senior career*
Years	Team	Apps	(Gls)
2017–2021	Paradou AC	5	(0)
2021–2022	WA Tlemcen	10	(0)
2022–2023	Olympique Akbou		(0)
2023–2024	USM Alger	4	(0)
2024–2025	SKAF Khemis Miliana		
2025–2026	JS Bordj Ménaïel		
2026–	JS Azazga		
- * Club domestic league appearances and goals as of 11 September 2026

Juba Chirani (Arabic: يوبا شيراني; born 4 January 1998) is an Algerian footballer who plays for JS Azazga.

== Career ==
In 2021, Chirani joined WA Tlemcen. In 2023, Chirani joined USM Alger.
