= Chouaib Boulkaboul =

Algerian footballer (born 2001)

Personal information
- Date of birth: 3 April 2001 (age 25)
- Place of birth: El Mouradia, Algeria
- Height: 1.69 m (5 ft 7 in)
- Position: Left-back

Team information
- Current team: JS Kabylie
- Number: 24

Youth career
- JMG Academy
- –2022: Paradou AC

Senior career*
Years	Team	Apps	(Gls)
2022–2025	Paradou AC	26	(0)
2025–2026	ES Mostaganem	15	(1)
2026–	JS Kabylie	24	(0)
- * Club domestic league appearances and goals as of 21:10, 19 November 2026 (UTC)

Chouaib Boulkaboul (born 3 April 2001) is an Algerian professional footballer who plays as a left-back for JS Kabylie.

== Club career ==
On 29 July 2025, he joined ES Mostaganem from Paradou AC.

On 22 January 2026, he joined JS Kabylie, signing with the Kabyle club a contract until the end of the 2027–28 season.
