= Nadhir Benbouali =

Algerian footballer (born 2000)

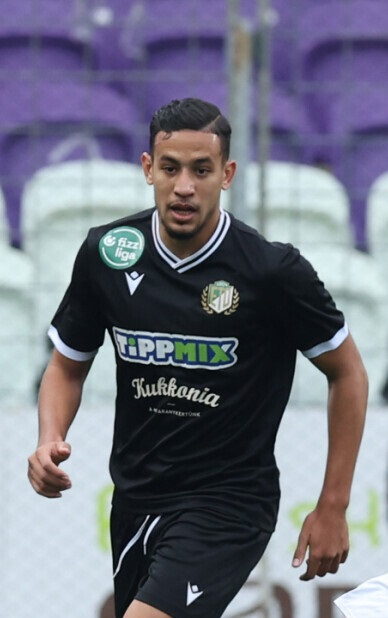
- Benbouali playing for Győr in 2025

Personal information
- Full name: Ahmed Nadhir Benbouali
- Date of birth: 17 April 2000 (age 26)
- Place of birth: Chlef, Algeria
- Height: 1.90 m (6 ft 3 in)
- Position: Forward

Team information
- Current team: Pyramids
- Number: 13

Youth career
- –2017: ASO Chlef
- 2017–2020: Paradou AC

Senior career*
Years	Team	Apps	(Gls)
2020–2022	Paradou AC	63	(23)
2022–2025	Charleroi	23	(2)
2023–2024	→ Zébra Élites	8	(7)
2024–2025	→ Győr (loan)	24	(7)
2025–2026	Győr	32	(15)
2026–	Pyramids	0	(0)

International career^{‡}
2026–	Algeria	5	(2)
- * Club domestic league appearances and goals as of 01st September 2026 ‡ National team caps and goals as of 22 June 2026

Ahmed Nadhir Benbouali (Arabic: أحمد نذير بن بوعلي; born 17 April 2000) is an Algerian professional footballer who plays as a forward for Egyptian Premier League club Pyramids and the Algeria national team.

== Club career ==
On 23 July 2022, Benbouali joined Belgian club Charleroi, signing a three-year contract with the club until 2025.

On 3 September 2024, Benbouali was loaned by Hungarian club Győr. On 22 September 2024, he scored twice in a 2–1 victory over Paksi FC. On 16 May 2026, he netted the only goal in a 1–0 away win for Győr over Kisvárda, securing his club's 5th league title on the final matchday.

== International career ==
On 22 June 2026, Benbouali scored for Algeria against Jordan in his country's second 2026 World Cup group match.

== Career statistics ==
=== International ===
No	Date	Venue	Opponent	Score	Result	Competition
1.	27 March 2026	Stadio Luigi Ferraris, Genoa, Italy	Guatemala	7–0	7–0	Friendly
2.	22 June 2026	Levi's Stadium, Santa Clara, United States	Jordan	1–1	2–1	2026 FIFA World Cup

== Honours ==
Győr

- Nemzeti Bajnokság I: 2025–26
