= Merouane Zerrouki =

Algerian footballer (born 2001)

Personal information
- Full name: Merouane Zerrouki
- Date of birth: January 25, 2001 (age 25)
- Place of birth: Kouba, Algiers, Algeria
- Height: 1.82 m (6 ft 0 in)
- Position: Forward

Team information
- Current team: ES Sétif
- Number: 20

Youth career
- 2016–2019: Paradou AC

Senior career*
Years	Team	Apps	(Gls)
2019–2023	Paradou AC	65	(14)
2023–2025	CR Belouizdad	17	(1)
2025-	ES Sétif	26	(9)

International career^{‡}
2021–	Algeria A'	1	(0)
Medal record
Men's football
Representing Algeria
FIFA Arab Cup
Winner	2021 Qatar
- * Club domestic league appearances and goals as of 5 June 2026 ‡ National team caps and goals as of December 1, 2021

Merouane Zerrouki (Arabic: مروان زروقي; born January 25, 2001, in Kouba, Algeria) is an Algerian professional footballer who plays as a forward for ES Sétif in the Algerian Ligue Professionnelle 1.

== Career ==
Zerrouki made his Algerian league debut on September 24, 2019, coming on as a substitute in the 1–0 win over ASO Chlef.

In August 2023, he joined CR Belouizdad.

== Honours ==
Algeria

- FIFA Arab Cup: 2021
