= Omar Benrabah Stadium =

Multi-use stadium in Algiers, Algeria

- Stade Dar el Beida
- Interactive map of Omar Benrabah Stadium
- Full name: Omar Benrabah Stadium
- Location: Rue des fréres Achouri, Dar El Beïda, Algeria
- Coordinates: 36.7208789°N 3.2102378°E
- Owner: DJS Dar El Beïda
- Operator: Paradou AC; USM Alger
- Capacity: 14,150
- Surface: Artificial turf
- Field size: 100 m × 60 m

Construction
- Opened: 2016

Tenants
- Paradou AC & CRB Dar El Beïda

Omar Benrabah Stadium (Arabic: ملعب عمر بن رابح), is a multi-use stadium located in the Dar El Beïda district of Algiers, Algeria. It is currently used mostly for football matches. It is frequently used by the Algeria A' national football team and the Algerian Under-23 National Team. also is the home ground of Paradou AC. The stadium holds 14,150 spectators.

The stadium was used as one of the venues for the 2009 African Under-17 Championship and hosted the final of the competition.

On August 18, 2022, the administration of USM Alger agreed with the authorities of Dar El Beïda to receive the 2022–23 season at Omar Benrabah Stadium in the presence of the supporters.
