= Yacine Titraoui =

Algerian footballer (born 2003)

Personal information
- Full name: Yacine Mohamed El Ghazali Titraoui
- Date of birth: 26 July 2003 (age 23)
- Place of birth: M'Sila, Algeria
- Height: 1.80 m (5 ft 11 in)
- Position: Central midfielder

Team information
- Current team: Lens
- Number: 8

Youth career
- Paradou AC

Senior career*
Years	Team	Apps	(Gls)
2021–2024	Paradou AC	85	(13)
2024–2026	Charleroi	66	(7)
2026–	Lens	7	(0)

International career^{‡}
2020	Algeria U20	7	(0)
2021–	Algeria	5	(0)
2022	Algeria U23	2	(0)
Medal record
Men's football
Representing Algeria
FIFA Arab Cup
Winner	2021 Qatar
- * Club domestic league appearances and goals as of 30 October 2026 ‡ National team caps and goals as of 11 June 2026 (UTC)

Yacine Mohamed El Ghazali Titraoui (Arabic: ياسين محمد الغزالي تيطراوي; born 26 July 2003) is an Algerian professional footballer who plays as a central midfielder for Ligue 1 club Lens and the Algeria national team.

== Club career ==
Titraoui made his professional debut for Paradou AC on 9 August 2021, replacing Kaassis in a 2–1 Ligue Professionnelle 1 away loss against USM Alger.

On 12 July 2024, Titraoui signed with Charleroi in Belgium for three seasons, with an optional fourth. Later that year, on 21 December, he scored his first goal for the club in a 2–1 win over Sint-Truiden.

On 3 August 2026, Titraoui joined Ligue 1 club Lens, signing a contract until 2031.

== International career ==
Already an under-20 international with Algeria, Titraoui was selected to the senior squad by Madjid Bougherra in November 2021, to take part in the FIFA Arab Cup.

== Career statistics ==
=== Club ===
As of match played 30 October 2026

Appearances and goals by club, season and competition
Club	Season	League			National cup (Note: Includes Algerian Cup, Belgian Cup, Coupe de France)		Continental		Other		Total	
Club	Season	Division	Apps	Goals	Apps	Goals	Apps	Goals	Apps	Goals	Apps	Goals
Paradou AC	2020–21	Algerian Ligue Professionnelle 1	4	1	—		—		—		4	1
Paradou AC	2021–22	Algerian Ligue Professionnelle 1	28	2	—		—		—		28	2
Paradou AC	2022–23	Algerian Ligue Professionnelle 1	26	3	—		—		—		26	3
Paradou AC	2023–24	Algerian Ligue Professionnelle 1	27	7	1	0	—		—		28	7
Paradou AC	Total		85	13	1	0	—		—		86	13
Charleroi	2024–25	Belgian Pro League	31	2	1	0	—		—		32	2
Charleroi	2025–26	Belgian Pro League	35	5	5	0	2 (Note: Appearances in UEFA Conference League)	0	—		42	5
Charleroi	Total		66	7	6	0	2	0	—		74	7
Lens	2026–27	Ligue 1	7	0	0	0	2 (Note: Appearances in UEFA Champions League)	0	1 (Note: Appearance in Trophée des Champions)	0	10	0
Career total			158	20	7	0	4	0	1	0	170	20

=== International ===
As of match played 31 March 2026

Appearances and goals by national team and year
National team	Year	Apps	Goals
Algeria	2021	2	0
Algeria	2025	1	0
Algeria	2026	2	0
Total		5	0

== Honours ==
RC Lens

- Trophée des Champions: 2026

Algeria

- FIFA Arab Cup: 2021
