= Mohamed Réda Hamidi =

Algerian footballer (born 2001)

Mohamed Réda Hamidi ⵎⵓⵀⴰⵎⴻⴷ ⵔⴻⴷⴰ ⵀⴰⵎⵉⴷⵉ
Personal information
- Full name: Mohamed Réda Hamidi
- Date of birth: 8 June 2001 (age 25)
- Place of birth: Sidi M'Hamed, Algiers, Algeria
- Height: 1.71 m (5 ft 7 in)
- Positions: Right-back; left winger

Team information
- Current team: JS Kabylie
- Number: 17

Youth career
- JMG Academy
- –2021: Paradou AC

Senior career*
Years	Team	Apps	(Gls)
2021–2025	Paradou AC	72	(5)
2024–2025	→ JS Kabylie (loan)	26	(0)
2025–	JS Kabylie	36	(2)

International career^{‡}
2019–2020	Algeria U20	7	(0)
2025	Algeria A'	1	(0)
- * Club domestic league appearances and goals as of 21:12, 19 November 2026 (UTC) ‡ National team caps and goals as of 16:05, 14 November 2025 (UTC)

Mohamed Réda Hamidi (Arabic: محمد رضا حميدي; Tamazight: ⵎⵓⵀⴰⵎⴻⴷ ⵔⴻⴷⴰ ⵀⴰⵎⵉⴷⵉ; born 8 June 2001) is an Algerian professional footballer who plays as a right-back or left winger for JS Kabylie.

== Club career ==
Born in Sidi M'Hamed (Algiers) and originally from Kabylia, in July 2024, Mohamed Réda Hamidi was loaned by Paradou AC to JS Kabylie until the end of the 2024–25 season. He finished the 2024–25 season as the top assist provider in the 2024–25 Algerian Ligue 1, with seven assists.

In July 2025, JS Kabylie bought out his release letter from Paradou AC and signed Hamidi until the end of the 2028–29 season.

== Honours ==
Individual

- Algerian Ligue Professionnelle 1 Top Assist Provider: 2024–25 (7 assists)
