= Youcef Douar =

Algerian footballer (born 1997)

Personal information
- Date of birth: 15 September 1997 (age 29)
- Place of birth: Algiers, Algeria
- Height: 1.76 m (5 ft 9 in)
- Position: Center-back

Team information
- Current team: USM Khenchela
- Number: 5

Youth career
- –2017: Paradou AC

Senior career*
Years	Team	Apps	(Gls)
2017-2024	Paradou AC	133	(2)
2024-2026	ES Sétif	40	(0)
2026-	USM Khenchela	0	(0)

International career^{‡}
2016–2017	Algeria U20	2	(0)
2017–2019	Algeria U23	9	(0)
2018	Algeria U21	1	(0)
- * Club domestic league appearances and goals as of 20 July 2026 ‡ National team caps and goals as of 18 January 2022

Youcef Douar (Arabic: يوسف دوار; born 15 September 1997) is an Algerian footballer who plays as a defender for USM Khenchela in the Algerian Ligue Professionnelle 1.

== Career ==
A graduate of the club's youth academy, Douar made his professional debut on 12 May 2018, playing the entirety of a 5–0 victory over Olympique de Médéa.

In August 2021, following a match against CR Belouizdad, Douar received a four-game suspension and a 40,000 dinar fine for insulting a match official.

In July 2024, he joined ES Sétif.

In July 2026, he joined USM Khenchela.

=== International ===
Douar has represented Algeria at several youth levels, including U20, U21, and U23.

== Career statistics ==
=== Club ===
As of match played 24 February 2023

Appearances and goals by club, season and competition
Club	Season	League			Cup		Continental		Other		Total	
Club	Season	Division	Apps	Goals	Apps	Goals	Apps	Goals	Apps	Goals	Apps	Goals
Paradou AC	2017–18	Algerian Ligue Professionnelle 1	2	0	—	—	—	—	—	—	2	0
Paradou AC	2018–19	Algerian Ligue Professionnelle 1	9	0	—	—	—	—	—	—	9	0
Paradou AC	2019–20	Algerian Ligue Professionnelle 1	18	0	1 (Note: Includes appearance in the Algerian Cup)	0	5 (Note: Includes appearances in the CAF Confederation Cup)	0	—	—	24	0
Paradou AC	2020–21	Algerian Ligue Professionnelle 1	24	0	—	—	—	—	—	—	24	0
Paradou AC	2021–22	Algerian Ligue Professionnelle 1	32	0	—	—	—	—	—	—	32	0
Paradou AC	2022–23	Algerian Ligue Professionnelle 1	12	1	—	—	—	—	—	—	12	1
Paradou AC	Total		97	1	1	0	5	0	—	—	103	1
Career total			97	1	1	0	5	0	—	—	103	1
