= 2020–21 NC Magra season =

NC Magra
2020–21 season
- President: Azzedine Bennacer
- Head coach: Mohamed Bacha (from 6 September 2020) (until 21 December 2020); Abdelkrim Latreche (from 4 January 2021) (until 9 April 2021); Aziz Abbès (from 12 April 2021)
- Stadium: Boucheligue Brothers Stadium
- Ligue 1: 9th
- League Cup: Runners–up
- Top goalscorer: League: Akram Demane (7 goals); All: Akram Demane (9 goals)
- Highest home attendance: 0 (Note: no one can attend games due to the COVID-19 pandemic)
- Lowest home attendance: 0 (Note: no one can attend games due to the COVID-19 pandemic)
- Average home league attendance: 0 (Note: no one can attend games due to the COVID-19 pandemic)

In the 2020–21 season, NC Magra is competing in the Ligue 1 for the 2nd season, as well as the League Cup. It is their 2nd consecutive season in the top flight of Algerian football. They competing in Ligue 1 and the League Cup. In its second season NC Magra signed a number of young players, and the goal was to ensure that they remained in the Ligue 1, and with the establishment of the League Cup competition, the club had ambitions and despite its involvement with large clubs, it was able to overcome it in the form of CS Constantine, CR Belouizdad and USM Alger. To reach the final of the first tournament in its history where he faced JS Kabylie and was defeated by penalty kicks.

== Squad list ==
Players and squad numbers last updated on 15 November 2020.
Note: Flags indicate national team as has been defined under FIFA eligibility rules. Players may hold more than one non-FIFA nationality.

No.	Nat.	Position	Name	Date of birth (age)	Signed from
Goalkeepers
1	(Algeria)	GK	Mohamed Tayeb Cherif	12 July 1999 (aged 21)	(Algeria) Youth system
12	(Algeria)	GK	Abdelmalek Necir	6 September 1992 (aged 28)	(Algeria) WA Boufarik
16	(Algeria)	GK	Zakaria Bouhalfaya	11 August 1997 (aged 23)	(Algeria) CA Bordj Bou Arreridj
Defenders
2	(Algeria)	RB	Kheir Eddine Ali Haïmoud	12 June 1999 (aged 21)	(Algeria) Paradou AC
3	(Algeria)	CB	Sofiane Khelili	9 December 1989 (aged 31)	(Tunisia) US Ben Guerdane
5	(Algeria)		Rachid Meghazi	18 January 1998 (aged 22)	(Algeria) WA Tlemcen
13	(Algeria)	CB	Noureddine Zaidi	21 July 1990 (aged 30)	(Algeria) ASM Oran
19	(Algeria)	RB	Khaled Derbal	7 August 1995 (aged 25)	(Algeria) CR Beni Thour
22	(Algeria)	CB	Mohamed Achref Aib	24 May 1990 (aged 30)	(Algeria) JS Saoura
25	(Algeria)	LB	Salah Hmida	23 May 1992 (aged 28)	(Algeria) A Bou Saâda
27	(Algeria)	LB	Brahim Salah Eddine Bernou	1 August 1994 (aged 26)	(Algeria) JS Saoura
	(Algeria)	RB	Ayache Ziouache	20 January 1995 (aged 25)	(Algeria) JSM Skikda
	(Algeria)	CB	Mohamed Amine Madani	20 March 1992 (aged 28)	(Tunisia) CS Chebba
Midfielders
8	(Algeria)	DM	Karm Benkouider	31 March 1999 (aged 21)	(Algeria) CS Constantine
11	(Algeria)	LW	Nadhir Korichi	14 July 1992 (aged 28)	(Tunisia) US Tataouine
14	(Algeria)		Oussama Bounouis	5 May 1995 (aged 25)	(Algeria) ASM Oran
15	(Algeria)	AM	Aziz Fegaâs	27 February 1993 (aged 27)	(Algeria) USM Aïn Beïda
21	(Algeria)		Mohammed Abderrahmane Chiboub	10 September 1999 (aged 21)	(Algeria) Youth system
23	(Algeria)	CM	Merouane Mehdaoui	10 January 1998 (aged 22)	(Algeria) CR Beni Thour
24	(Algeria)	RW	Mohammed Essaid Bourahla	24 May 1990 (aged 30)	(Algeria) WA Tlemcen
26	(Algeria)		Abdesslem Bouchouareb	10 December 1997 (aged 23)	(Algeria) AS Khroub
	(Algeria)		Walid Belhamri	19 November 1990 (aged 30)	(Algeria) JS Saoura
Forwards
4	(Niger)	AM	Boubacar Hainikoye Soumana	7 October 1998 (aged 22)	(Algeria) CR Belouizdad
6	(Algeria)	ST	Hadj Bouguèche	7 December 1983 (aged 37)	(Algeria) WA Tlemcen
7	(Algeria)	LW	Akram Demane	1 January 1990 (aged 31)	(Algeria) RC Arbaâ
10	(Algeria)		Naoufel Righi	1 October 1992 (aged 28)	(Algeria) MO Constantine
17	(Algeria)	LW	Sid Ali Kabri	16 December 1998 (aged 22)	(Algeria) Youth system
18	(Algeria)		Abdelhamid Bey	31 January 1999 (aged 21)	(Algeria) Youth system
20	(Algeria)	RW	Mounib Benmerzoug	6 June 1995 (aged 25)	(Algeria) AS Khroub
29	(Algeria)		Tarik Slimani	17 December 2000 (aged 20)	(Algeria) Youth system
43	(Algeria)	LW	Mohamed Benkablia	2 February 1993 (aged 27)	(Algeria) Unattached

== Competitions ==
=== Overview ===
Competition	Record								Started round	Final position / round	First match	Last match
Competition	G	W	D	L	GF	GA	GD	Win %	Started round	Final position / round	First match	Last match
Ligue 1	38	14	10	14	38	44	−6	36.84	—N/a	9th	28 November 2020	24 August 2021
League Cup	5	3	2	0	9	4	+5	60.00	Round of 16	Runners–up	20 April 2021	10 August 2021
Total	43	17	12	14	47	48	−1	39.53				

Updated to match played 24 August 2021
Source: Competitions

== League table ==
Pos	Team	Pld	W	D	L	GF	GA	GD	Pts
7	MC Alger	38	15	12	11	59	43	+16	57
8	CS Constantine	38	15	12	11	43	31	+12	57
9	NC Magra	38	14	10	14	38	44	−6	52
10	Olympique de Médéa	38	13	12	13	40	43	−3	51
11	Paradou AC	38	13	11	14	53	53	0	50

Updated to match(es) played on 28 August 2021. Source: dzfoot.com
Rules for classification: 1) points; 2) head-to-head points; 3) head-to-head goal difference; 4) goal difference; 5) total goals; 6) fairplay ranking; 7) playoff.

=== Results summary ===
Overall								Home						Away					
Pld	W	D	L	GF	GA	GD	Pts	W	D	L	GF	GA	GD	W	D	L	GF	GA	GD
38	14	10	14	38	44	−6	52	11	5	3	25	17	+8	3	5	11	13	27	−14

Last updated: 24 August 2021.
Source: Competitive matches

=== Results by round ===
Round	1	2	3	4	5	6	7	8	9	10	11	12	13	14	15	16	17	18	19	20	21	22	23	24	25	26	27	28	29	30	31	32	33	34	35	36	37	38
Ground	H	A	H	A	H	H	A	H	A	H	A	H	A	H	A	A	H	A	H	A	H	A	H	A	A	H	A	H	A	H	A	H	A	H	H	A	H	A
Result	W	L	D	L	L	L	L	D	D	W	L	L	D	D	L	D	W	L	D	W	W	L	D	L	D	W	D	W	L	W	L	W	L	W	W	W	W	W
Position	2	7	7	12	14	16	19	18	19	16	17	17	16	17	18	18	18	17	17	16	13	14	14	15	17	15	14	13	14	14	15	13	14	12	11	11	11	9

Updated to match(es) played on 24 August 2021. Source: Competitive matches
A = Away; H = Home; W = Win; D = Draw; L = Loss

=== Matches ===
On 22 October 2020, the Algerian Ligue Professionnelle 1 fixtures were announced.

28 November 2020 Round 1	NC Magra	3–2	ASO Chlef	Magra
14:30	Aïb 33'; Demane 61'; Bouguèche 90+3'	Soccerway report	Beldjilali 50' (pen.), 81' (pen.)	Stadium: Boucheligue Brothers Stadium; Attendance: 0 (close doors); Referee: Houssam Benyahia

4 December 2020 Round 2	AS Ain M'lila	2–1	NC Magra	Aïn M'lila
14:00	Demane 8' (pen.), 80'	Soccerway report	Fegas 16'	Stadium: Touhami Zoubir Khelifi Stadium; Attendance: 0 (close doors); Referee: Redouane Necib

12 December 2020 Round 3	NC Magra	0–0	US Biskra	Magra
14:00		Soccerway report		Stadium: Boucheligue Brothers Stadium; Attendance: 0 (close doors); Referee: Malek Ait Ameur

17 December 2020 Round 4	ES Sétif	2–0	NC Magra	Sétif
15:00	Laouafi 24'; Saïdi 36'	Soccerway report		Stadium: Stade 8 Mai 1945; Attendance: 0 (close doors); Referee: Mustapha Bessiri

23 December 2020 Round 5	NC Magra	0–2	JS Saoura	Magra
14:30		Soccerway report	Hamidi 16' (pen.); Messaoudi 63'	Stadium: Boucheligue Brothers Stadium; Attendance: 0 (close doors); Referee: Lyés Bekouassa

27 December 2020 Round 6	NC Magra	1–3	Olympique de Médéa	Magra
14:30	Hainikoye 40' (pen.)	Soccerway report	Khalfallah 14'; Elghomari 63' (pen.), 89'	Stadium: Boucheligue Brothers Stadium; Attendance: 0 (close doors); Referee: Farouk Mial

9 January 2021 Round 7	USM Bel Abbès	1–0	NC Magra	Sidi Bel Abbès
15:00	Metref 31'	Soccerway report		Stadium: Stade 24 Fevrier 1956; Attendance: 0 (close doors); Referee: Youcef Gamouh

16 January 2021 Round 8	NC Magra	0–0	Paradou AC	Magra
14:00		Soccerway report		Stadium: Boucheligue Brothers Stadium; Attendance: 0 (close doors); Referee: Bilal Bendjahene

22 January 2021 Round 9	NA Hussein Dey	1–1	NC Magra	Belouizdad
14:30	Betrouni 71'	Soccerway report	Hainikoye 46'	Stadium: Stade 20 Août 1955; Attendance: 0 (close doors); Referee: Mohamed Boutaraa

26 January 2021 Round 10	NC Magra	1–0	JS Kabylie	Magra
14:30	Aïb 90'	Soccerway report		Stadium: Boucheligue Brothers Stadium; Attendance: 0 (close doors); Referee: Mustapha Bessiri

30 January 2021 Round 11	CS Constantine	2–0	NC Magra	El Khroub
14:30	Amokrane 11'; Yettou 87'	Soccerway report		Stadium: Stade Abed Hamdani; Attendance: 0 (close doors); Referee: Mustapha Ghorbal

6 February 2021 Round 12	NC Magra	0–1	RC Relizane	Magra
15:00		Soccerway report	Aoued 78'	Stadium: Boucheligue Brothers Stadium; Attendance: 0 (close doors); Referee: Houssam Benyahia

13 February 2021 Round 13	CA Bordj Bou Arreridj	2–2	NC Magra	Bordj Bou Arréridj
14:30	Lachahab 46'; Zeghdane 79'	Soccerway report	Hainikoye 23'; Demane 67'	Stadium: Stade 20 Août 1955; Attendance: 0 (close doors); Referee: Ahmed Bouzrar

26 February 2021 Round 15	USM Alger	3–0	NC Magra	Bologhine
16:00	Demane 1' (o.g.); Mahious 61'; Aliane 77'	Soccerway report		Stadium: Omar Hamadi Stadium; Attendance: 0 (close doors); Referee: Mehdi Abid Charef

5 March 2021 Round 16	WA Tlemcen	2–2	NC Magra	Tlemcen
15:00	Bellatreche 58' (pen.); Belaribi 73'	Soccerway report	Bouguèche 43'; Korichi 82'	Stadium: Stade Akid Lotfi; Attendance: 0 (close doors); Referee: Malek Ait Ameur

13 March 2021 Round 17	NC Magra	3–2	JSM Skikda	Magra
15:00	Bourahla 47'; Demane 81'; Khelili 86'	Soccerway report	Merzougi 70', 90+2' (pen.)	Stadium: Boucheligue Brothers Stadium; Attendance: 0 (close doors); Referee: Lotfi Bekouassa

21 March 2021 Round 19	NC Magra	0–0	MC Oran	Magra
15:00		Soccerway report		Stadium: Boucheligue Brothers Stadium; Attendance: 0 (close doors); Referee: Farouk Mial

16 April 2021 Round 14	NC Magra	0–0	CR Belouizdad	Magra
16:00		Soccerway report		Stadium: Boucheligue Brothers Stadium; Attendance: 0 (close doors); Referee: Mohamed Saïdi

30 April 2021 Round 18	MC Alger	5–1	NC Magra	Algiers
22:30	Bensaha 45+1'; Frioui 59', 69', 78'; Bourdim 67'	Soccerway report	Bourahla 57'	Stadium: Stade du 5 Juillet; Attendance: 0 (close doors); Referee: Nabil Boukhalfa

4 May 2021 Round 20	ASO Chlef	0–1	NC Magra	Chlef
22:30		Soccerway report	Bouguèche 1'	Stadium: Stade Mohamed Boumezrag; Attendance: 0 (close doors); Referee: Lahrache

16 May 2021 Round 21	NC Magra	3–2	AS Ain M'lila	Magra
16:00	Bouguèche 18', 55'; Fegas 52'	Soccerway report	Djabout 67'; Hamia 75' (pen.)	Stadium: Boucheligue Brothers Stadium; Attendance: 0 (close doors); Referee: Hamza Boucetta

22 May 2021 Round 22	US Biskra	1–0	NC Magra	Biskra
18:00	Boukarroum 35' (pen.)	Soccerway report		Stadium: Stade du 18 Février; Attendance: 0 (close doors); Referee: Youcef Gamouh

26 May 2021 Round 23	NC Magra	2–2	ES Sétif	Magra
17:00	Fegas 74', 90' (pen.)	Soccerway report	Deghmoum 51'; Berbache 85'	Stadium: Boucheligue Brothers Stadium; Attendance: 0 (close doors); Referee: Farouk Mial

30 May 2021 Round 24	JS Saoura	1–0	NC Magra	Béchar
18:00	Hamidi 88'	Soccerway report		Stadium: Stade 20 Août 1955; Attendance: 0 (close doors); Referee: Ali Nader

13 June 2021 Round 25	Olympique de Médéa	0–0	NC Magra	Médéa
17:00		Soccerway report		Stadium: Stade Imam Lyes; Attendance: 0 (close doors); Referee: Houssam Benyahia

19 June 2021 Round 26	NC Magra	1–0	USM Bel Abbès	Magra
17:00	Demane 88'	Soccerway report		Stadium: Boucheligue Brothers Stadium; Attendance: 0 (close doors); Referee: Amine Sekhraoui

27 June 2021 Round 27	Paradou AC	1–1	NC Magra	Dar El Beïda
17:00	Bouzok 69'	Soccerway report	Demane 20'	Stadium: Omar Benrabah Stadium; Attendance: 0 (close doors); Referee: Mohamed Boutaraa

1 July 2021 Round 28	NC Magra	1–0	NA Hussein Dey	Magra
17:00	Aïb 57'	Soccerway report		Stadium: Boucheligue Brothers Stadium; Attendance: 0 (close doors); Referee: Mehdi Abid Charef

4 July 2021 Round 29	JS Kabylie	1–0	NC Magra	Tizi Ouzou
20:00	Bensayah 8' (pen.)	Soccerway report		Stadium: Stade 1er Novembre 1954; Attendance: 0 (close doors); Referee: Abderrezzak Arab

8 July 2021 Round 30	NC Magra	1–0	CS Constantine	Magra
17:45	Ziouache 38'	Soccerway report		Stadium: Boucheligue Brothers Stadium; Attendance: 0 (close doors); Referee: Hamza Bouslimani

13 July 2021 Round 31	RC Relizane	1–0	NC Magra	Relizane
18:00	Seguer 80'	Soccerway report		Stadium: Stade Tahar Zoughari; Attendance: 0 (close doors); Referee: Lotfi Bekouassa

17 July 2021 Round 32	NC Magra	3–0	CA Bordj Bou Arreridj	Magra
17:45	Ziouache 10'; Benkablia 16'; Righi 76'	Soccerway report		Stadium: Boucheligue Brothers Stadium; Attendance: 0 (close doors); Referee: Amine Hansal

23 July 2021 Round 33	CR Belouizdad	1–0	NC Magra	Belouizdad
18:00	Nessakh 90+6'	Soccerway report		Stadium: Stade 20 Août 1955; Attendance: 0 (close doors); Referee: Mohamed Boutaraa

27 July 2021 Round 34	NC Magra	2–1	USM Alger	Magra
17:45	Bouchouareb 9'; Fegaâs 30'	Soccerway report	Zouari 5'	Stadium: Boucheligue Brothers Stadium; Attendance: 0 (close doors); Referee: Ahmed Bouzrar

15 August 2021 Round 35	NC Magra	2–1	WA Tlemcen	Magra
17:30	Belhamri 31' (pen.); Ali Haïmoud 56'	Soccerway report	Amiri 26'	Stadium: Boucheligue Brothers Stadium; Attendance: 0 (close doors); Referee: Youcef Gamouh

18 August 2021 Round 36	JSM Skikda	0–2	NC Magra	Skikda
17:30		Soccerway report	Aïb 32'; Belhamri 87'	Stadium: Stade 20 Août 1955; Attendance: 0 (close doors); Referee: Milia

21 August 2021 Round 37	NC Magra	2–1	MC Alger	Magra
17:30	Demane 25'; Korichi 60' (pen.)	Soccerway report	Esso 37'	Stadium: Boucheligue Brothers Stadium; Attendance: 0 (close doors); Referee: Benzohra

24 August 2021 Round 38	MC Oran	1–2	NC Magra	Oran
21:00	Reguig 90'	Soccerway report	Demane 17'; Belhamri 76'	Stadium: Ahmed Zabana Stadium; Attendance: 0 (close doors); Referee: Belhachemi

== League Cup ==
20 April 2021 Preliminary round	NC Magra	3–0	CS Constantine	Magra
15:30	Haïmoud 31'; Demane 67'; Bouguèche 72' Necir, Driss, Benkablia (Demane, 51'), Meghazi, Aïb, Slimani, Ali Haïmoud, Righi (Hmida, 86') Bounouis, Bouchouareb (Benkouider, 84'), Korichi (Bouguèche, 57').	Report	Rahmani, Guemroud, Derradji (Amokrane, 64'), Mebarakou, Haddouche (Lakdja, 46'), Temine, Yettou, Lamri, Yaiche, Shibun (Haddad, 63'), Amrane (Salhi, 46').	Stadium: Boucheligue Brothers Stadium; Attendance: 0 (close doors); Referee: Lotfi Bekouassa

8 May 2021 Round of 16	CR Belouizdad	0–0 (a.e.t.) (2–4 p)	NC Magra	Algiers
22:30	Moussaoui, Boulakhoua (substituted off) 79' (Belkhiter, (substituted on) 79'), Bouchar, Nessakh, Khali, Draoui (substituted off) 79' (Selmi, (substituted on) 79'), Mrezigue, Tarikat (substituted off) 46' (Belahouel, (substituted on) 46'), Koukpo (substituted off) 46' (Sayoud, (substituted on) 46'), Merzougui, Khalfallah (substituted off) 100' (Djerrar, (substituted on) 100').		Bouhalfaya, Benkablia (substituted off) 60' (Bouguèche, (substituted on) 60'), Madani, Benkouider (substituted off) 81' (Righi, (substituted on) 81'), Aib, Fegaâs, Haïmoud, Soumana (substituted off) 60' (Demane, (substituted on) 60'), Bouchouareb, Bourahla, Belhamri.	Stadium: Stade du 5 Juillet; Attendance: 0 (close doors); Referee: Mohamed Saïdi
	Penalties
	Djerrar (penalty scored); Merzougui (penalty missed); Nessakh (penalty scored); Belahouel (penalty missed)		(penalty scored) Bouguèche; (penalty scored) Righi; (penalty scored) Kabri; (penalty scored) Fegas

4 June 2021 Quarter-finals	NC Magra	2–1	JS Saoura	Magra
16:00	Bouchouareb 21'; Meghazi 90'	Report	Hamidi 50'	Stadium: Boucheligue Brothers Stadium; Attendance: 0 (close doors); Referee: Hamza Bouslimani

8 June 2021 Semi-finals	NC Magra	2–1 (a.e.t.)	USM Alger	Magra
16:00	Ziouache 40'; Bourahla 110'	Report	Beneddine 90+10' (pen.)	Stadium: Boucheligue Brothers Stadium; Attendance: 0 (close doors); Referee: Mehdi Abid Charef

10 August 2021 Final	NC Magra	2–2 (a.e.t.) (1–4 p)	JS Kabylie	Algiers
19:00	Demane 11'; Korichi 93'		Boualia 37'; Haroun 120'	Stadium: Stade du 5 Juillet; Attendance: 0 (close doors); Referee: Mustapha Ghorbal
	Penalties
	Fegaâs (penalty missed); Korichi (penalty missed); Belhamri (penalty scored)		(penalty scored) Souyad; (penalty scored) Ghanem; (penalty scored) Benchaira; (penalty scored) Boualia

== Squad information ==
=== Playing statistics ===
No.	Pos	Nat	Player	Total		Ligue 1		League Cup	
No.	Pos	Nat	Player	Apps	Goals	Apps	Goals	Apps	Goals
Goalkeepers
1	GK	(Algeria) ALG	Mohamed Tayeb Cherif	2	0	2	0	0	0
12	GK	(Algeria) ALG	Abdelmalek Necir	8	0	7	0	1	0
16	GK	(Algeria) ALG	Zakaria Bouhalfaya	33	0	29	0	4	0
Defenders
2	DF	(Algeria) ALG	Kheir Eddine Ali Haïmoud	5	1	0	0	5	1
3	DF	(Algeria) ALG	Sofiane Khelili	23	1	23	1	0	0
5	DF	(Algeria) ALG	Rachid Meghazi	30	1	26	0	4	1
13	DF	(Algeria) ALG	Noureddine Zaidi	4	0	4	0	0	0
19	DF	(Algeria) ALG	Khaled Derbal	5	0	5	0	0	0
22	DF	(Algeria) ALG	Mohamed Achref Aib	40	4	37	4	3	0
25	DF	(Algeria) ALG	Salah Hmida	16	0	12	0	4	0
27	DF	(Algeria) ALG	Brahim Salah Eddine Bernou	18	0	17	0	1	0
13	DF	(Algeria) ALG	Ayache Ziouache	19	3	16	2	3	1
61	DF	(Algeria) ALG	Abdelhamid Driss	2	0	0	0	2	0
	DF	(Algeria) ALG	Mohamed Amine Madani	7	0	4	0	3	0
Midfielders
8	MF	(Algeria) ALG	Karm Benkouider	31	0	27	0	4	0
11	MF	(Algeria) ALG	Nadhir Korichi	20	3	18	2	2	1
14	MF	(Algeria) ALG	Oussama Bounouis	14	0	13	0	1	0
15	MF	(Algeria) ALG	Aziz Fegaâs	38	5	34	5	4	0
21	MF	(Algeria) ALG	Mohammed Abderrahmane Chiboub	0	0	0	0	0	0
23	MF	(Algeria) ALG	Merouane Mehdaoui	8	0	8	0	0	0
24	MF	(Algeria) ALG	Mohammed Essaid Bourahla	36	3	32	2	4	1
26	MF	(Algeria) ALG	Abdesslem Bouchouareb	38	2	33	1	5	1
	MF	(Algeria) ALG	Walid Belhamri	14	3	12	3	2	0
Forwards
4	FW	(Niger) NIG	Boubacar Haïnikoye	27	3	24	3	3	0
6	FW	(Algeria) ALG	Hadj Bouguèche	27	6	23	5	4	1
7	FW	(Algeria) ALG	Akram Demane	32	9	27	7	5	2
10	FW	(Algeria) ALG	Naoufel Righi	26	1	24	1	2	0
17	FW	(Algeria) ALG	Sid Ali Kabri	4	0	4	0	0	0
18	FW	(Algeria) ALG	Abdelhamid Bey	4	0	4	0	0	0
20	FW	(Algeria) ALG	Mounib Benmerzoug	17	0	17	0	0	0
29	FW	(Algeria) ALG	Tarik Slimani	10	0	8	0	2	0
43	FW	(Algeria) ALG	Mohamed Benkablia	20	1	16	1	4	0
Players transferred out during the season

Last updated: 24 August 2021
Source: fr.soccerway.com

=== Goalscorers ===
Includes all competitive matches. The list is sorted alphabetically by surname when total goals are equal.

No.	Nat.	Player	Pos.	L 1	AC	TOTAL
7	(Algeria)	Akram Demane	FW	7	2	9
6	(Algeria)	Hadj Bouguèche	FW	5	1	6
15	(Algeria)	Aziz Fegaâs	MF	5	0	5
22	(Algeria)	Mohamed Achref Aib	DF	4	0	4
4	(Niger)	Boubacar Haïnikoye	FW	3	0	3
	(Algeria)	Walid Belhamri	MF	3	0	3
11	(Algeria)	Nadhir Korichi	MF	2	1	3
24	(Algeria)	Mohammed Essaid Bourahla	MF	2	1	3
13	(Algeria)	Ayache Ziouache	DF	2	1	3
26	(Algeria)	Abdesslem Bouchouareb	MF	1	1	2
10	(Algeria)	Naoufel Righi	FW	1	0	1
43	(Algeria)	Mohamed Benkablia	FW	1	0	1
3	(Algeria)	Sofiane Khelili	DF	1	0	1
2	(Algeria)	Kheir Eddine Ali Haïmoud	DF	0	1	1
5	(Algeria)	Rachid Meghazi	DF	0	1	1
Own Goals				0	0	0
Totals				38	9	47

== Transfers ==
=== In ===
Date	Pos	Player	From club	Transfer fee	Source
14 September 2020	MF	(Algeria) Karim Benkouider	CS Constantine	Free transfer	
17 September 2020	FW	(Algeria) Abdesslem Bouchouareb	AS Khroub	Free transfer	
19 September 2020	MF	(Algeria) Nadir Korichi	(Tunisia) US Tataouine	Free transfer	
25 September 2020	GK	(Algeria) Zakaria Bouhalfaya	CA Bordj Bou Arreridj	Free transfer	
30 September 2020	FW	(Algeria) Hadj Bouguèche	WA Tlemcen	Free transfer	
24 October 2020	DF	(Algeria) Sofiane Khelili	(Tunisia) US Ben Guerdane	Free transfer	
27 October 2020	FW	(Niger) Boubacar Haïnikoye	CR Belouizdad	Loan for one year	

=== Out ===
Date	Pos	Player	To club	Transfer fee	Source
26 August 2020	DF	(Algeria) Abdelmoumen Chikhi	JS Kabylie	Free transfer	
4 September 2020	FW	(Algeria) Issad Lakdja	CS Constantine	Free transfer	
19 October 2020	GK	(Algeria) Abdelkader Kellouche	JSM Béjaïa	Free transfer	
