= 2019–20 NC Magra season =

NC Magra
2019–20 season
- Chairman: Azzedine Bennacer
- Head coach: Karim Zaoui (from 27 June 2019) (until 15 September 2019); El Hadi Khezar (until 10 January 2020); Hadj Merine (from 14 January 2020)
- Stadium: Stade 8 Mai 1945, Sétif; Stade Martyr Al Taher Qidum, Ras El Oued (Note: NC Magra played their home matches at Stade 8 Mai 1945, Sétif, instead of their regular stadium Boucheligue Brothers Stadium, Magra, due to renovation.)
- Ligue 1: 16th
- Algerian Cup: Round of 64

In the 2019–20 season, NC Magra competed in the Ligue 1 for the 1st season, as well as the Algerian Cup. On March 15, 2020, the Ligue de Football Professionnel (LFP) decided to halt the season due to the COVID-19 pandemic in Algeria. On July 29, 2020, the LFP declared that season is over and CR Belouizdad to be the champion, the promotion of four teams from the League 2, and scraping the relegation for the current season.

== Squad list ==
Players and squad numbers last updated on 15 August 2019.
Note: Flags indicate national team as has been defined under FIFA eligibility rules. Players may hold more than one non-FIFA nationality.

No.	Nat.	Position	Name	Date of Birth (Age)	Signed from
Goalkeepers
Defenders
Midfielders
Forwards

== Competitions ==
=== Overview ===
Competition	Record								Started round	Final position / round	First match	Last match
Competition	G	W	D	L	GF	GA	GD	Win %	Started round	Final position / round	First match	Last match
Ligue 1	22	4	7	11	16	30	−14	18.18	—N/a	16th	15 August 2019	14 March 2020
Algerian Cup	1	0	0	1	1	4	−3	0.00	Round of 64		28 December 2019	
Total	23	4	7	12	17	34	−17	17.39				

Updated to match played 3 June 2019
Source: Competitions

== League table ==
Pos	Team	Pld	W	D	L	GF	GA	GD	Pts	PPG
12	ASO Chlef	21	6	7	8	15	17	−2	25	1.19
13	CA Bordj Bou Arreridj	22	6	7	9	22	29	−7	25	1.14
14	US Biskra	22	6	3	13	17	33	−16	21	0.95
15	NA Hussein Dey	22	4	7	11	14	27	−13	19 (Note: Head-to-head points: Magra 3, Hussein Day 0)	0.86
16	NC Magra	22	4	7	11	16	30	−14	19	0.86

Updated to match(es) played on 15 March 2020. Source: dzfoot.com
Rules for classification: 1) points; 2) head-to-head points; 3) head-to-head goal difference; 4) goal difference; 5) total goals; 6) fairplay ranking; 7) playoff.

=== Results summary ===
Overall								Home						Away					
Pld	W	D	L	GF	GA	GD	Pts	W	D	L	GF	GA	GD	W	D	L	GF	GA	GD
22	4	7	11	16	30	−14	19	3	4	4	9	10	−1	1	3	7	7	20	−13

Last updated: 22 April 2018.
Source: Competitive matches

=== Results by round ===
Round	1	2	3	4	5	6	7	8	9	10	11	12	13	14	15	16	17	18	19	20	21	22	23	24	25	26	27	28	29	30
Ground	H	A	H	A	H	A	H	A	H	A	H	H	A	H	A	A	H	A	H	A	H	A	H	A	H	A	A	H	A	H
Result	W	L	W	L	L	D	D	L	L	L	D	D	W	W	L	D	D	L	L	D	L	L	C	C	C	C	C	C	C	C
Position	16	9	8	9	11	12	12	12	15	16	16	16	14	13	14	14	14	14	15	15	16	16	16	16	16	16	16	16	16	16

Updated to match(es) played on 14 March 2019. Source: Competitive matches
A = Away; H = Home; W = Win; D = Draw; L = Loss

=== Matches ===
Win Draw Loss

15 August 2019 Round 1	NC Magra	1–0	ASO Chlef	Sétif
20:00	Boulaïnceur 36'	Soccerway report		Stadium: Stade 8 Mai 1945; Attendance: 0 (close doors); Referee: Mehdi Abid Charef

19 August 2019 Round 2	CR Belouizdad	2–1	NC Magra	Algiers (Note: CR Belouizdad played their home match against NC Magra at July 5, 1962 Stadium, Algiers, instead of their regular stadium Stade 20 Août 1955, Belouizdad, due to renovation.)
21:00	Khali 2'; Belahouel 30'	Soccerway report	Keddad 64' (o.g.)	Stadium: July 5, 1962 Stadium; Referee: Bilal Bendjahene

30 August 2019 Round 3	NC Magra	2–1	USM Bel Abbès	Sétif
20:00	Tatem 65'; Demane 81'	Soccerway report	Aichi 62'	Stadium: Stade 8 Mai 1945; Attendance: 0 (close doors); Referee: Hamza Bouslimani

12 September 2019 Round 4	ES Sétif	3–0	NC Magra	Sétif
19:00	Deghmoum 26'; Djahnit 45+1'; Ghacha 76'	Soccerway report		Stadium: Stade 8 Mai 1945; Referee: Ahmed Bouzrar

24 September 2019 Round 5	NC Magra	1–2	CS Constantine	Sétif
16:00	Maâziz 36'	Soccerway report	Boudebouda 14'; Amokrane 73'	Stadium: Stade 8 Mai 1945; Attendance: 0 (close doors); Referee: Mustapha Ghorbal

28 September 2019 Round 6	AS Ain M'lila	1–1	NC Magra	Aïn M'lila
16:00	Bitam 53'	Soccerway report	Dmigha 84'	Stadium: Touhami Zoubir Khelifi Stadium; Referee: Farouk Mial

5 October 2019 Round 7	NC Magra	0–0	MC Alger	Sétif
16:00		Soccerway report		Stadium: Stade 8 Mai 1945; Referee: Bilal Bendjahene

23 October 2019 Round 8	JS Saoura	3–0	NC Magra	Béchar
19:00	Khoualed 25'; Zaidi 45+3'; Elmammeri 64'	Soccerway report		Stadium: Stade 20 Août 1955; Referee: Hamza Boucetta

30 October 2019 Round 9	NC Magra	1–2	USM Alger	Sétif
15:00	Ziani 90+2'	Soccerway report	Zouari 66'; Mahious 70' (pen.)	Stadium: Stade 8 Mai 1945; Referee: Malek Ait Ameur

9 November 2019 Round 10	MC Oran	1–0	NC Magra	Oran
17:00	Freifer 37'	Soccerway report		Stadium: Ahmed Zabana Stadium; Referee: Lyés Bekouassa

23 November 2019 Round 11	NC Magra	1–1	CA Bordj Bou Arreridj	Sétif
16:00	Abdelhafid 14'	Soccerway report	Guessan 78'	Stadium: Stade 8 Mai 1945; Referee: Hamza Boucetta

7 December 2019 Round 13	NA Hussein Dey	0–1	NC Magra	Dar El Beïda
15:00		Soccerway report	Ziani 48'	Stadium: Omar Benrabah Stadium; Referee: Missoum Benabdellah

16 December 2019 Round 14	NC Magra	1–0	US Biskra	Ras El Oued
15:00	Demane 84'	Soccerway report		Stadium: Stade Martyr Al Taher Qidum; Referee: Nabil Boukhalfa

21 December 2019 Round 15	JS Kabylie	3–0	NC Magra	Tizi Ouzou
16:00	Hamroune 62'; Banouh 67', 78'	Soccerway report		Stadium: Stade 1er Novembre 1954; Attendance: 0 (close doors); Referee: Houssam Benyahia

19 January 2020 Round 12	NC Magra	1–1	Paradou AC	Ras El Oued
14:30	Abdelhafid 65'	Soccerway report	Bouzok 26'	Stadium: Stade Martyr Al Taher Qidum; Referee: Mustapha Bessiri

1 February 2020 Round 16	ASO Chlef	0–0	NC Magra	Chlef
17:45		Soccerway report		Stadium: Stade Mohamed Boumezrag; Referee: Mohamed Saïdi

8 February 2020 Round 17	NC Magra	1–1	CR Belouizdad	Ras El Oued
15:00	Lakdja 90'	Soccerway report	Hainikoye 74'	Stadium: Stade Martyr Al Taher Qidum; Referee: Abderrezzak Arab

17 February 2020 Round 18	USM Bel Abbès	3–1	NC Magra	Sidi Bel Abbès
17:00	Belhocini 8', 42', 75'	Soccerway report	Billel 50'	Stadium: Stade 24 Fevrier 1956; Referee: Houssam Benyahia

22 February 2020 Round 19	NC Magra	0–1	ES Sétif	Ras El Oued
15:00		Soccerway report	Bekakchi 38'	Stadium: Stade Martyr Al Taher Qidum; Referee: Lahlou Benbraham

29 February 2020 Round 20	CS Constantine	1–1	NC Magra	Constantine
17:00	Yettou 77'	Soccerway report	Haroun 32' (pen.)	Stadium: Stade Mohamed Hamlaoui; Referee: Mohamed Boutaraa

7 March 2020 Round 21	NC Magra	0–1	AS Aïn M'lila	Ras El Oued
15:00		Soccerway report	Siam 88'	Stadium: Stade Martyr Al Taher Qidum; Referee: Mehdi Abid Charef

14 March 2020 Round 22	MC Alger	3–2	NC Magra	Algiers
17:45	Frioui 21', 37' (pen.); Bourdim 54'	Soccerway report	Haroun 50'; Aib 67'	Stadium: Stade du 5 Juillet; Attendance: 0 (close doors); Referee: Abdelmoumen Touabti
Note: due to coronavirus outbreak, Ministry of Health, Population and Hospital Reform decided to be all matches played behind closed doors.

Round 23	NC Magra	Cancelled	JS Saoura	Ras El Oued
				Stadium: Stade Martyr Al Taher Qidum

Round 24	USM Alger	Cancelled	NC Magra	Bologhine
				Stadium: Omar Hamadi Stadium

Round 25	NC Magra	Cancelled	MC Oran	Ras El Oued
				Stadium: Stade Martyr Al Taher Qidum

Round 26	CA Bordj Bou Arreridj	Cancelled	NC Magra	Bordj Bou Arréridj
				Stadium: August 20, 1955 Stadium

Round 27	Paradou AC	Cancelled	NC Magra	Bologhine
				Stadium: Omar Hamadi Stadium

Round 28	NC Magra	Cancelled	NA Hussein Dey	Ras El Oued
				Stadium: Stade Martyr Al Taher Qidum

Round 29	US Biskra	Cancelled	NC Magra	Biskra
				Stadium: Stade du 18 Février

Round 30	NC Magra	Cancelled	JS Kabylie	Ras El Oued
				Stadium: Stade Martyr Al Taher Qidum

== Algerian Cup ==
28 December 2019 Round of 64	CS Constantine	4–1	NC Magra	Constantine
17:30	Benayada 18'; Lamri 45+1'; Boucheriha 51'; Amokrane 83'	Report	Demane 38'	Stadium: Stade Mohamed Hamlaoui; Referee: Mohamed Saïdi
Note: Lineup for NC Magra - Benmalek, Hebal, Billel, Oukali, Chikhi, Derradji, Chikh Touhami, Fegas, Akram Demane (Ben Abdekrim ?’), Dmigha (Bey 46’), Boulaïnceur

== Squad information ==
=== Playing statistics ===
No.	Pos	Nat	Player	Total		Ligue 1		Algerian Cup	
No.	Pos	Nat	Player	Apps	Goals	Apps	Goals	Apps	Goals
Goalkeepers
1	GK	(Algeria) ALG	Youcef Chikher	0	0	0	0	0	0
16	GK	(Algeria) ALG	Abdelkader Kellouche	18	0	18	0	0	0
30	GK	(Algeria) ALG	Boualem Benmalek	5	0	4	0	1	0
Defenders
2	DF	(Algeria) ALG	Yaâkoub Anani	9	0	9	0	0	0
3	DF	(Algeria) ALG	Hani Aichour	0	0	0	0	0	0
4	DF	(Algeria) ALG	Nadjib Maâziz	9	1	9	1	0	0
5	DF	(Algeria) ALG	AbdelKarim Oukali	19	0	18	0	1	0
14	DF	(Algeria) ALG	Chamseddine Derradji	22	0	21	0	1	0
18	DF	(Algeria) ALG	Fouad Billel	10	1	9	1	1	0
23	DF	(Algeria) ALG	Abdelmoumen Chikhi	1	0	0	0	1	0
24	DF	(Algeria) ALG	Hossam Hebal	15	0	14	0	1	0
28	DF	(Algeria) ALG	Hadj Chikh Boucherit	0	0	0	0	0	0
	DF	(Algeria) ALG	Mohamed Achref Aib	7	1	7	1	0	0
Midfielders
7	MF	(Algeria) ALG	Mohamed Chikh Touhami	18	0	17	0	1	0
8	MF	(Algeria) ALG	Ismail Tatem	6	1	6	1	0	0
11	MF	(Algeria) ALG	Ahmed Djellali	3	0	3	0	0	0
13	MF	(Algeria) ALG	Tayeb Maroci	7	0	7	0	0	0
21	MF	(Algeria) ALG	Oussama Khelifi	7	0	7	0	0	0
25	MF	(Algeria) ALG	Adhem Demane	1	0	1	0	0	0
26	MF	(Algeria) ALG	Sami Dmigha	6	1	5	1	1	0
	MF	(Algeria) ALG	Assad Lakdja	7	1	7	1	0	0
Forwards
6	FW	(Algeria) ALG	Faouzi Rahal	18	0	18	0	0	0
12	FW	(Algeria) ALG	Rafik Boulaïnceur	19	1	18	1	1	0
15	FW	(Algeria) ALG	Aziz Fegas	19	0	18	0	1	0
17	FW	(Algeria) ALG	Akram Demane	17	3	16	2	1	1
20	FW	(Algeria) ALG	Billel Ziani	22	2	22	2	0	0
29	FW	(Algeria) ALG	Abdelkader Meziane	2	0	2	0	0	0
	FW	(Algeria) ALG	Ali Haroun	7	2	7	2	0	0
	FW	(Algeria) ALG	Hani Gasmi	5	0	5	0	0	0
Players transferred out during the season
10	MF	(Algeria) ALG	Hocine El Orfi	8	0	8	0	0	0
9	FW	(Algeria) ALG	Abdelhak Abdelhafid	12	2	12	2	0	0

Last updated: 11 June 2018
Source: fr.soccerway.com

=== Goalscorers ===
Includes all competitive matches. The list is sorted alphabetically by surname when total goals are equal.

No.	Nat.	Player	Pos.	L 1	AC	TOTAL
17	(Algeria)	Akram Demane	FW	2	1	3
20	(Algeria)	Billel Ziani	FW	2	0	2
	(Algeria)	Ali Haroun	FW	2	0	2
9	(Algeria)	Abdelhak Abdelhafid	FW	2	0	2
4	(Algeria)	Nadjib Maâziz	DF	1	0	1
18	(Algeria)	Fouad Billel	DF	1	0	1
	(Algeria)	Mohamed Achref Aib	DF	1	0	1
8	(Algeria)	Ismail Tatem	MF	1	0	1
26	(Algeria)	Sami Dmigha	MF	1	0	1
	(Algeria)	Assad Lakdja	MF	1	0	1
12	(Algeria)	Rafik Boulaïnceur	FW	1	0	1
Own Goals				1	0	1
Totals				16	1	17

== Squad list ==
As of 15 August, 2019 Note: Flags indicate national team as defined under FIFA eligibility rules; some limited exceptions apply. Players may hold more than one non-FIFA nationality.

No.	Pos.	Nation	Player
1	GK	ALG	Youcef Chikher
2	DF	ALG	Yaâkoub Anani
3	DF	ALG	Hani Aichour
4	DF	ALG	Nadjib Maâziz
5	DF	ALG	AbdelKarim Oukali
6	FW	ALG	Faouzi Rahal
7	MF	ALG	Mohamed Chikh Touhami
8	MF	ALG	Ismail Tatem
9	FW	ALG	Abdelhak Abdelhafid
10	MF	ALG	Hocine El Orfi
11	MF	ALG	Ahmed Djellali
12	FW	ALG	Rafik Boulaïnceur
13	MF	ALG	Tayeb Maroci
14	DF	ALG	Chamseddine Derradji

No.	Pos.	Nation	Player
15	FW	ALG	Aziz Fegas
16	GK	ALG	Abdelkader Kellouche
17	FW	ALG	Akram Demane
18	DF	ALG	Fouad Billel
20	FW	ALG	Billel Ziani
21	MF	ALG	Oussama Khelifi
23	DF	ALG	Abdelmoumen Chikhi
24	DF	ALG	Hossam Hebal (captain)
25	MF	ALG	Adhem Demane
26	MF	ALG	Sami Dmigha
28	DF	ALG	Hadj Chikh Boucherit
29	FW	ALG	Abdelkader Meziane
30	GK	ALG	Boualem Benmalek

== Transfers ==
=== In ===
Date	Pos	Player	from club	Transfer fee	Source
25 July 2019	MF	(Algeria) Tayeb Maroci	DRB Tadjenanet	Free transfer	
7 August 2019	MF	(Algeria) Hocine El Orfi	NA Hussein Dey	Free transfer	

=== Out ===
Date	Pos	Player	to club	Transfer fee	Source
2 July 2019	DF	(Algeria) Ayache Ziouache	CS Constantine	Free transfer	
11 July 2019	DF	(Algeria) Soufyane Mebarki	WA Tlemcen	Free transfer	
11 July 2019	DF	(Algeria) Mohamed Oukrif	WA Tlemcen	Free transfer	
4 January 2020	MF	(Algeria) Hocine El Orfi	(Saudi Arabia) Al-Mujazzal	Free transfer	
