= 2021–22 NC Magra season =

NC Magra
2021–22 season
- President: Azzedine Bennacer
- Head coach: Aziz Abbès (until 9 December 2021); Lassaad Maamar (from 13 December 2021)
- Stadium: Boucheligue Brothers Stadium
- Ligue 1: 13th
- Top goalscorer: League: Akram Demane; Ramdane Hitala (5 goals); All: Akram Demane; Ramdane Hitala (5 goals)

In the 2021–22 season, NC Magra is competing in the Ligue 1 for the 3rd season. It is their 3rd consecutive season in the top flight of Algerian football.

== Squad list ==
Players and squad numbers last updated on 20 October 2021.
Note: Flags indicate national team as has been defined under FIFA eligibility rules. Players may hold more than one non-FIFA nationality.

| No. | Nat. | Position | Name | Date of birth (age) | Signed from |
Goalkeepers
| 1 | (Algeria) | GK | Mohamed Tayeb Cherif | 12 July 1999 (aged 22) | (Algeria) Youth system |
| 12 | (Algeria) | GK | Abdelmalek Necir | 6 September 1992 (aged 29) | (Algeria) WA Boufarik |
| 16 | (Algeria) | GK | Adel Chellali | 14 August 1986 (aged 35) | (Algeria) WA Tlemcen |
Defenders
| 2 | (Algeria) | CB | Mohamed Oukrif | 14 August 1988 (aged 33) | (Algeria) WA Tlemcen |
| 3 | (Algeria) | LB | Djamel Ibouzidène | 22 January 1994 (aged 27) | (Algeria) WA Tlemcen |
| 4 | (Algeria) | CB | Abderrezak Bitam | 18 April 1989 (aged 32) | (Algeria) AS Ain M'lila |
| 5 | (Algeria) | CB | Rachid Meghazi | 18 January 1998 (aged 23) | (Algeria) WA Tlemcen |
| 13 | (Algeria) | RB | Ayache Ziouache | 20 January 1995 (aged 26) | (Algeria) JSM Skikda |
| 18 | (Algeria) | CB | Khaled Nèche | 27 July 1994 (aged 27) | (Algeria) RC Relizane |
| 20 | (Algeria) | CB | Oussama Boultouak | 29 October 1993 (aged 28) | (Algeria) JSM Skikda |
| 22 | (Algeria) | RB | Soheyb Talbi | 10 March 1994 (aged 27) | (Algeria) JSM Skikda |
| 23 | (Algeria) | CB | Mohamed Amine Madani | 20 March 1992 (aged 29) | (Tunisia) CS Chebba |
| 25 | (Algeria) | LB | Hmida Salah | 23 May 1992 (aged 29) | (Algeria) A Bou Saâda |
Midfielders
| 8 | (Algeria) | MF | Karm Benkouider | 31 March 1999 (aged 22) | (Algeria) CS Constantine |
| 14 | (Algeria) | MF | Zakaria Benhocine | 19 May 1986 (aged 35) | (Algeria) JSM Skikda |
| 15 | (Algeria) | MF | Aziz Fegaâs | 27 February 1993 (aged 28) | (Algeria) USM Aïn Beïda |
| 17 | (Algeria) | MF | Ali Amiri | 23 October 1987 (aged 34) | (Algeria) WA Tlemcen |
| 19 | (Algeria) | MF | Walid Belhamri | 19 November 1990 (aged 31) | (Algeria) JS Saoura |
| 24 | (Algeria) | MF | Mohammed Essaid Bourahla | 24 May 1990 (aged 31) | (Algeria) WA Tlemcen |
| 26 | (Algeria) | MF | Abdesslem Bouchouareb | 10 December 1997 (aged 24) | (Algeria) AS Khroub |
| 27 | (Algeria) | MF | Abderrezak Kibboua | 2 December 1999 (aged 22) | (Algeria) Paradou AC |
Forwards
| 6 | (Algeria) | FW | Hadj Bouguèche | 7 December 1983 (aged 38) | (Algeria) WA Tlemcen |
| 7 | (Algeria) | FW | Akram Demane | 1 January 1990 (aged 32) | (Algeria) RC Arbaâ |
| 9 | (Algeria) | FW | Ramdane Hitala | 8 February 1995 (aged 26) | (Algeria) RC Relizane |
| 11 | (Algeria) | FW | Nadhir Korichi | 14 July 1992 (aged 29) | (Tunisia) US Tataouine |
| 21 | (Algeria) | FW | Faik Amrane | 26 November 1997 (aged 24) | (Algeria) CS Constantine |

== Competitions ==
=== Overview ===
| Competition | Record | | | | | | | | Started round | Final position / round | First match | Last match |
| Competition | G | W | D | L | GF | GA | GD | Win % | Started round | Final position / round | First match | Last match |
|---|---|---|---|---|---|---|---|---|---|---|---|---|
| Ligue 1 | 34 | 13 | 6 | 15 | 31 | 36 | −5 | 38.24 | —N/a | To be confirmed | 23 October 2021 | In Progress |
| Total | 34 | 13 | 6 | 15 | 31 | 36 | −5 | 38.24 | | | | |

Updated to match played 10 June 2022
Source: Competitions

== League table ==
| Pos | Team | Pld | W | D | L | GF | GA | GD | Pts | Qualification or relegation |
|---|---|---|---|---|---|---|---|---|---|---|
| 11 | MC Oran | 34 | 10 | 16 | 8 | 32 | 29 | +3 | 46 | |
| 12 | HB Chelghoum Laïd | 34 | 11 | 12 | 11 | 40 | 41 | −1 | 45 | |
| 13 | NC Magra | 34 | 13 | 6 | 15 | 31 | 36 | −5 | 45 | |
| 14 | RC Arbaâ | 34 | 10 | 13 | 11 | 40 | 45 | −5 | 43 | |
| 15 | Olympique de Médéa (R) | 34 | 10 | 6 | 18 | 32 | 53 | −21 | 36 | Relegation to Algerian Ligue 2 |

Updated to match(es) played on 17 June 2022. Source: the-sports.org
Rules for classification: 1) points; 2) head-to-head points; 3) head-to-head goal difference; 4) goal difference; 5) total goals; 6) fairplay ranking; 7) playoff.
(R) Relegated

=== Results summary ===
| Overall | | | | | | | | Home | | | | | | Away | | | | | |
| Pld | W | D | L | GF | GA | GD | Pts | W | D | L | GF | GA | GD | W | D | L | GF | GA | GD |
|---|---|---|---|---|---|---|---|---|---|---|---|---|---|---|---|---|---|---|---|
| 34 | 13 | 6 | 15 | 31 | 36 | −5 | 45 | 9 | 4 | 4 | 18 | 10 | +8 | 4 | 2 | 11 | 13 | 26 | −13 |

Last updated: 10 June 2022.
Source: Competitive matches

=== Results by round ===
| Round | 1 | 2 | 3 | 4 | 5 | 6 | 7 | 8 | 9 | 10 | 11 | 12 | 13 | 14 | 15 | 16 | 17 | 18 | 19 | 20 | 21 | 22 | 23 | 24 | 25 | 26 | 27 | 28 | 29 | 30 | 31 | 32 | 33 | 34 |
|---|---|---|---|---|---|---|---|---|---|---|---|---|---|---|---|---|---|---|---|---|---|---|---|---|---|---|---|---|---|---|---|---|---|---|
| Ground | A | H | A | H | A | H | A | H | A | H | A | H | A | H | A | H | A | H | A | H | A | H | A | H | A | H | A | H | A | H | A | H | A | H |
| Result | L | D | L | L | L | L | W | L | L | W | L | W | L | W | L | W | W | W | L | D | L | W | W | W | D | D | L | W | L | L | D | D | W | W |
| Position | 15 | 15 | 15 | 18 | 18 | 18 | 16 | 17 | 18 | 17 | 17 | 15 | 16 | 13 | 16 | 12 | 12 | 10 | 13 | 12 | 13 | 13 | 11 | 11 | 11 | 12 | 12 | 11 | 12 | 13 | 14 | 14 | 14 | 13 |

Updated to match(es) played on 17 June 2022. Source: Competitive matches
A = Away; H = Home; W = Win; D = Draw; L = Loss

=== Matches ===
The league fixtures were announced on 7 October 2021.

| 23 October 2021 Round 1 | WA Tlemcen | 1–0 | NC Magra | Tlemcen |
| 16:00 | Mebarki 30' | Report | | Stadium: Stade Akid Lotfi; Attendance: 0 (Note: The match was played behind closed doors due to the COVID-19 pandemic in Algeria.); Referee: Mohamed Amine Benzohra |

| 29 October 2021 Round 2 | NC Magra | 0–0 | MC Alger | Magra |
| 15:00 | | Report | | Stadium: Boucheligue Brothers Stadium; Referee: Abdellah Benchehida |

| 6 November 2021 Round 3 | CS Constantine | 1–0 | NC Magra | Constantine |
| 15:00 | Yaiche 85' | Report | | Stadium: Stade Ramdane Benabdelmalek; Referee: Youcef Taieb Bouderbal |

| 20 November 2021 Round 4 | NC Magra | 1–3 | Paradou AC | Magra |
| 14:30 | Belhamri 17' | Report | Titraoui 3'; Okello 59'; Benbouali 69' | Stadium: Boucheligue Brothers Stadium; Referee: Youcef Gamouh |

| 25 November 2021 Round 5 | Olympique de Médéa | 3–1 | NC Magra | Médéa |
| 14:30 | Baâli 62'; Lakroum 69', 85' | Report | Meghazi 47' | Stadium: Stade Imam Lyes; Referee: Lahlou Benbraham |

| 4 December 2021 Round 6 | NC Magra | 0–2 | ES Sétif | Magra |
| 14:30 | | Report | Kendouci 70'; Motrani 75' | Stadium: Boucheligue Brothers Stadium; Referee: Mohamed Saïdi |

| 11 December 2021 Round 7 | NA Hussein Dey | 0–1 | NC Magra | Belouizdad |
| 14:30 | | Report | Amiri 40' (pen.) | Stadium: Stade 20 Août 1955; Attendance: 0 (close doors); Referee: Youcef Taieb Bouderbal |

| 17 December 2021 Round 8 | NC Magra | 1–2 | RC Arbaâ | Magra |
| 15:00 | Neche 29' | Report | Kismoun 64'; Haddad 77' | Stadium: Boucheligue Brothers Stadium; Referee: Mohamad Salah Dafri |

| 24 December 2021 Round 9 | JS Saoura | 1–0 | NC Magra | Béchar |
| 17:00 | Hamidi 13' | Report | | Stadium: Stade 20 Août 1955; Referee: Amine Hansal |

| 29 December 2021 Round 10 | NC Magra | 1–0 | US Biskra | Magra |
| 14:30 | Bouguèche 16' | Report | | Stadium: Boucheligue Brothers Stadium; Referee: Amine Sekhraoui |

| 3 January 2022 Round 11 | USM Alger | 4–1 | NC Magra | Bologhine |
| 18:00 | Belaïd 19'; Benzaza 39'; Benkhelifa 54'; Belkacemi 75' (pen.) | Report | Bouchouareb 24'; Meghazi (yellow card) 25'; Bouguèche (yellow card) 49'; Benkouider (yellow card) 65' | Stadium: Omar Hamadi Stadium; Attendance: 0 (close doors); Referee: Houssam Benyahia |

| 8 January 2022 Round 12 | NC Magra | 2–0 | HB Chelghoum Laïd | Magra |
| 14:30 | Bouguèche 42'; Bouchouareb 74' | Report | | Stadium: Boucheligue Brothers Stadium; Referee: Bilal Bendjahene |

| 16 January 2022 Round 13 | JS Kabylie | 3–0 | NC Magra | Tizi Ouzou |
| 15:00 | Bensayah 8', 71'; Nezla 48' | Report | | Stadium: Stade 1er Novembre 1954; Attendance: 0 (close doors); Referee: Bilel Soltani |

| 21 January 2022 Round 14 | NC Magra | 2–0 | ASO Chlef | Magra |
| 15:00 | Driss 64'; Bouguèche 72' | Report | | Stadium: Boucheligue Brothers Stadium; Referee: Youcef Gamouh |

| 25 January 2022 Round 15 | MC Oran | 2–1 | NC Magra | Oran |
| 14:30 | Guenina 14' (pen.); Belaribi 87' | Report | Baghdaoui 53' | Stadium: Ahmed Zabana Stadium; Referee: Lyés Bekouassa |

| 29 January 2022 Round 16 | NC Magra | 1–0 | CR Belouizdad | Magra |
| 14:30 | Ziouache 51' | Report | | Stadium: Boucheligue Brothers Stadium; Referee: Mohamed Saïdi |

| 5 February 2022 Round 17 | RC Relizane | 1–2 | NC Magra | Relizane |
| 15:00 | Barka 82' | Report | Hitala (45-2); Demane 90+1' | Stadium: Tahar Zoughari Stadium; Referee: Hamza Bouslimani |

| 25 February 2022 Round 18 | NC Magra | 1–0 | WA Tlemcen | Magra |
| 15:00 | Salah 37' | Report | | Stadium: Boucheligue Brothers Stadium; Attendance: 0 Referee: Amine Hansal |

| 1 March 2022 Round 19 | MC Alger | 2–1 | NC Magra | Algiers |
| 18:00 | Frioui 28', 72' | Report | Hitala 35' | Stadium: Stade du 5 Juillet; Attendance: 0 (close doors); Referee: Mohamed Boutaraa |

| 7 March 2022 Round 20 | NC Magra | 1–1 | CS Constantine | Magra |
| 14:30 | Ghanem 10' | Report | Ardji 83' | Stadium: Boucheligue Brothers Stadium; Referee: Lahlou Benbraham |

| 13 March 2022 Round 21 | Paradou AC | 3–1 | NC Magra | Dar El Beïda |
| 14:30 | Bouzok 21', 48'; Benbouali 69' | Report | Ghanem 39' (pen.) | Stadium: Omar Benrabah Stadium; Referee: Bilal Bendjahene |

| 19 March 2022 Round 22 | NC Magra | 2–0 | Olympique de Médéa | Magra |
| 15:00 | Demane 48'; Kibboua 54' | Report | | Stadium: Boucheligue Brothers Stadium; Referee: Akram Mechairia |

| 26 March 2022 Round 23 | ES Sétif | 0–2 | NC Magra | Sétif |
| 15:00 | | Report | Demane 27' (pen.), 45+2' | Stadium: Stade 8 Mai 1945; Attendance: 0 (close doors); Referee: Lotfi Bekouassa |

| 1 April 2022 Round 24 | NC Magra | 1–0 | NA Hussein Dey | Magra |
| 15:30 | Bourahla 29' | Report | | Stadium: Boucheligue Brothers Stadium; Referee: Mohamed Saïdi |

| 12 April 2022 Round 25 | RC Arbaâ | 1–1 | NC Magra | Larbaâ |
| 15:45 | Deghmani 16' (pen.) | Report | Demane 84' (pen.) | Stadium: Ismaïl Makhlouf Stadium; Referee: Mohamed Ali Nader |

| 17 April 2022 Round 26 | NC Magra | 0–0 | JS Saoura | Magra |
| 15:45 | | Report | | Stadium: Boucheligue Brothers Stadium; Referee: Youcef Gamouh |

| 22 April 2022 Round 27 | US Biskra | 1–0 | NC Magra | Biskra |
| 22:30 | Boukarroum 59' (pen.) | Report | | Stadium: 18 February Stadium; Referee: Houssam Benyahia |

| 29 April 2022 Round 28 | NC Magra | 1–0 | USM Alger | Magra |
| 15:45 | Bouchouareb 73' | Report | | Stadium: Boucheligue Brothers Stadium; Referee: Abderrezak Arab |

| 7 May 2022 Round 29 | HB Chelghoum Laïd | 2–0 | NC Magra | Chelghoum Laïd |
| 16:00 | Harrari 8'; Demane 87' | Report | | Stadium: 11 December 1961 Stadium; Referee: Youcef Taieb Bouderbal |

| 13 May 2022 Round 30 | NC Magra | 0–1 | JS Kabylie | Magra |
| 16:00 | | Report | Bensayah 54' | Stadium: Boucheligue Brothers Stadium; Referee: Lotfi Bekouassa |

| 21 May 2022 Round 31 | ASO Chlef | 0–0 | NC Magra | Chlef |
| 16:00 | | Report | | Stadium: Mohamed Boumezrag Stadium; Referee: Mustapha Ghorbal |

| 27 May 2022 Round 32 | NC Magra | 0–0 | MC Oran | Magra |
| 16:45 | | Report | | Stadium: Boucheligue Brothers Stadium; Referee: Hamza Bouslimani |

| 3 June 2022 Round 33 | CR Belouizdad | 1–2 | NC Magra | Belouizdad |
| 16:45 | Merzougui 29' | Report | Kibboua 11', 25' | Stadium: 20 August 1955 Stadium; Attendance: 0 (close doors); Referee: Akram Mechairia |

| 10 June 2022 Round 34 | NC Magra | 4–1 | RC Relizane | Magra |
| 16:45 | Hitala 3' (pen.), 17', 28'; Demane 90+3' | Report | Belalia 88' | Stadium: Boucheligue Brothers Stadium; Referee: Marouane Mohamed Belkebir |

== Squad information ==
=== Playing statistics ===
| No. | Pos | Nat | Player | Total | | Ligue 1 | |
| No. | Pos | Nat | Player | Apps | Goals | Apps | Goals |
Goalkeepers
| 1 | GK | (Algeria) ALG | Mohamed Tayeb Cherif | 12 | 0 | 12 | 0 |
| 12 | GK | (Algeria) ALG | Abdelmalek Necir | 4 | 0 | 4 | 0 |
| 16 | GK | (Algeria) ALG | Adel Chellali | 18 | 0 | 18 | 0 |
Defenders
| 2 | DF | (Algeria) ALG | Mohamed Oukrif | 23 | 0 | 23 | 0 |
| 3 | DF | (Algeria) ALG | Djamel Ibouzidène | 15 | 0 | 15 | 0 |
| 4 | DF | (Algeria) ALG | Abderrezak Bitam | 19 | 0 | 19 | 0 |
| 5 | DF | (Algeria) ALG | Rachid Meghazi | 11 | 1 | 11 | 1 |
| 13 | DF | (Algeria) ALG | Ayache Ziouache | 29 | 1 | 29 | 1 |
| 18 | DF | (Algeria) ALG | Khaled Nèche | 28 | 1 | 28 | 1 |
| 22 | DF | (Algeria) ALG | Soheyb Talbi | 20 | 0 | 20 | 0 |
| 23 | DF | (Algeria) ALG | Mohamed Amine Madani | 11 | 0 | 11 | 0 |
| 25 | DF | (Algeria) ALG | Hmida Salah | 28 | 1 | 28 | 1 |
| 62 | DF | (Algeria) ALG | Abdelhamid Driss | 8 | 1 | 8 | 1 |
Midfielders
| 8 | MF | (Algeria) ALG | Karm Benkouider | 25 | 0 | 25 | 0 |
| 11 | FW | (Algeria) ALG | Fouad Ghanem | 7 | 2 | 7 | 2 |
| 14 | MF | (Algeria) ALG | Zakaria Benhocine | 5 | 0 | 5 | 0 |
| 15 | MF | (Algeria) ALG | Aziz Fegaâs | 0 | 0 | 0 | 0 |
| 17 | MF | (Algeria) ALG | Ali Amiri | 10 | 1 | 10 | 1 |
| 19 | MF | (Algeria) ALG | Laid Ouadji | 5 | 0 | 5 | 0 |
| 24 | MF | (Algeria) ALG | Mohammed Essaid Bourahla | 26 | 1 | 26 | 1 |
| 26 | MF | (Algeria) ALG | Abdesslem Bouchouareb | 23 | 3 | 23 | 3 |
| 27 | MF | (Algeria) ALG | Abderrezak Kibboua | 24 | 3 | 24 | 3 |
| | MF | (Algeria) ALG | Khalil Demane | 15 | 1 | 15 | 1 |
| | MF | (Algeria) ALG | Hichem Chekal | 1 | 0 | 1 | 0 |
| | MF | (Algeria) ALG | Mohamed El Amine Baghdaoui | 13 | 1 | 13 | 1 |
| | MF | (Algeria) ALG | Billal Mekdour | 1 | 0 | 1 | 0 |
| | MF | (Algeria) ALG | Yacine Zeghad | 3 | 0 | 3 | 0 |
Forwards
| 6 | FW | (Algeria) ALG | Hadj Bouguèche | 28 | 3 | 28 | 3 |
| 7 | FW | (Algeria) ALG | Akram Demane | 27 | 5 | 27 | 5 |
| 9 | FW | (Algeria) ALG | Ramdane Hitala | 26 | 5 | 26 | 5 |
| 20 | FW | (Algeria) ALG | Chaker Kaddour Chérif | 5 | 0 | 5 | 0 |
| 21 | FW | (Algeria) ALG | Faik Amrane | 8 | 0 | 8 | 0 |
| 45 | FW | (Algeria) ALG | Yasser Bennoui | 2 | 0 | 2 | 0 |
| | FW | (Algeria) ALG | Khayreddine Bey | 2 | 0 | 2 | 0 |
| | FW | (Algeria) ALG | Anis Talhi | 2 | 0 | 2 | 0 |
Players transferred out during the season
| 20 | DF | (Algeria) ALG | Oussama Boultouak | 10 | 0 | 10 | 0 |
| 19 | MF | (Algeria) ALG | Walid Belhamri | 8 | 1 | 8 | 1 |

Last updated: 10 June 2022
Source: soccerway.com

=== Goalscorers ===
As of 10 June 2022

Includes all competitive matches. The list is sorted alphabetically by surname when total goals are equal.

| No. | Nat. | Player | Pos. | L 1 | TOTAL |
|---|---|---|---|---|---|
| 7 | (Algeria) | Akram Demane | FW | 5 | 5 |
| 9 | (Algeria) | Ramdane Hitala | FW | 5 | 5 |
| 6 | (Algeria) | Hadj Bouguèche | FW | 3 | 3 |
| 26 | (Algeria) | Abdesslem Bouchouareb | MF | 3 | 3 |
| 27 | (Algeria) | Abderrezak Kibboua | MF | 3 | 3 |
| 11 | (Algeria) | Fouad Ghanem | MF | 2 | 2 |
| 17 | (Algeria) | Ali Amiri | MF | 1 | 1 |
| 19 | (Algeria) | Walid Belhamri | MF | 1 | 1 |
| 24 | (Algeria) | Mohammed Essaid Bourahla | MF | 1 | 1 |
| 5 | (Algeria) | Rachid Meghazi | DF | 1 | 1 |
| 18 | (Algeria) | Khaled Neche | DF | 1 | 1 |
| 25 | (Algeria) | H'Mida Salah | DF | 1 | 1 |
| 13 | (Algeria) | Ayache Ziouache | DF | 1 | 1 |
| 62 | (Algeria) | Abdelhamid Driss | DF | 1 | 1 |
| | (Algeria) | Mohamed El Amine Baghdaoui | MF | 1 | 1 |
| | (Algeria) | Khalil Demane | MF | 1 | 1 |
| Own Goals | | | | 0 | 0 |
| Totals | | | | 31 | 31 |

== Transfers ==
=== In ===
| Date | Pos | Player | From club | Transfer fee | Source |
|---|---|---|---|---|---|
| 6 September 2021 | RB | (Algeria) Soheyb Talbi | JSM Skikda | Free transfer | |
| 18 September 2021 | CB | (Algeria) Mohamed Oukrif | WA Tlemcen | Free transfer | |
| 18 September 2021 | GK | (Algeria) Adel Chellali | WA Tlemcen | Free transfer | |
| 24 September 2021 | CB | (Algeria) Oussama Boultouak | JSM Skikda | Free transfer | |
| 10 October 2021 | ST | (Algeria) Ramdane Hitala | RC Relizane | Free transfer | |
| 12 October 2021 | ST | (Algeria) Abderrezak Kibboua | Paradou AC | Loan | |

=== Out ===
| Date | Pos | Player | To club | Transfer fee | Source |
|---|---|---|---|---|---|
| 12 August 2021 | CB | (Algeria) Sofiane Khelili | (Saudi Arabia) Ohod Club | Free transfer | |
| 7 September 2021 | GK | (Algeria) Zakaria Bouhalfaya | ES Sétif | Undisclosed | |
| 12 September 2021 | CB | (Algeria) Mohamed Achref Aib | HB Chelghoum Laïd | Free transfer | |
| 13 September 2021 | FW | (Algeria) Naoufel Righi | HB Chelghoum Laïd | Free transfer | |
| 5 October 2021 | FW | (Algeria) Mounib Benmerzoug | USM Annaba | Free transfer | |
