= 2020–21 Algerian League Cup =

2020–21 League Cup
- Logo of the 2020–21 edition

Tournament details
- Country: Algeria
- Dates: 20 April – 10 August 2021
- Teams: 20

Final positions
- Champions: JS Kabylie (1st title)
- Runners-up: NC Magra

Tournament statistics
- Matches played: 19
- Goals scored: 37 (1.95 per match)

The 2020–21 Algerian League Cup was the 4th season of the Algerian League Cup. The competition was open to all 20 clubs participating in the Algerian Ligue Professionnelle 1, Twenty years after it came back again due to the cancellation of the Algerian Cup. JS Kabylie won their first league cup title and qualified to the 2021–22 CAF Confederation Cup.

== Rules and dates ==
The FAF presented two variants to the members of the Federal Bureau who opted for the following system:

- The clubs concerned: the 20 teams of professional Ligue 1.
- The period of progress: this competition will start at the end of the first leg and after the transfer the mercato.
- The 4 clubs entered in the African Cups: in this case CR Belouizdad, MC Alger, ES Sétif and JS Kabylie, are exempt from the preliminary round.
- Eight clubs out of the remaining 16 will be drawn to play a preliminary round which will allow four teams to qualify.
- The four qualified clubs, plus the four exempted as well as the eight remaining, will play in the round of 16 after a draw.
- The following rounds will be contested in a classic way with a quarter-final, semi-finals and a final.
- The first club drawn will receive on its own ground and behind closed doors.

The competition started on 16 April 2021.

Round	Club of Ligue 1
Pre. round	16 – 20 April 2021
Round of 16	30 April – 8 May 2021
Quarter-finals	4 – 5 June 2021
Semi-finals	8 – 9 June 2021
Final	10 August 2021

== Preliminary round ==
The Preliminary round and Round of 16 draw took place on 10 April at 11:00 a.m local time at Algerian Football Federation headquarters. The four Algerian teams engaged in continental competition MC Alger, CR Belouizdad, JS Kabylie and ES Sétif were exempted from this round.

16 April 2021	CA Bordj Bou Arréridj	0–0 (a.e.t.) (2–3 p)	MC Oran	Bordj Bou Arréridj
22:30		Report		Stadium: Stade 20 Août 1955; Attendance: 0 (Note: The match was played behind closed doors due to the COVID-19 pandemic in Algeria.); Referee: Youcef Gamouh
	Penalties
	Sebie (penalty missed); Hammouche (penalty scored); Bousmaha (penalty missed); Rahba (penalty scored); Gagaâ (penalty missed)		(penalty scored) Ezzemani; (penalty missed) Bentiba; (penalty scored) Guertil; (penalty scored) Fourloul

20 April 2021	NA Hussein Dey	4–0	AS Aïn M'lila	Belouizdad
15:30	Boussalem 3', 52'; Banouh 30', 65'	Report		Stadium: Stade 20 Août 1955; Attendance: 0 Referee: Mustapha Bessiri

20 April 2021	NC Magra	3–0	CS Constantine	Magra
15:30	Haïmoud 31'; Demane 67'; Bouguèche 72'	Report		Stadium: Boucheligue Brothers Stadium; Attendance: 0 Referee: Lotfi Bekouassa

20 April 2021	Olympique de Médéa	2–1	ASO Chlef	Médéa
15:30	Kenniche 8'; Elghomari 40'	Report	Dahmani 68'	Stadium: Stade Imam Lyes; Attendance: 0 Referee: Mustapha Ghorbal

== Round of 16 ==
30 April 2021	RC Relizane	0–1	MC Oran	Relizane
15:30			Mellal 45'	Stadium: Stade Tahar Zoughari; Attendance: 0 Referee: Lotfi Bekouassa

30 April 2021	US Biskra	0–0 (a.e.t.) (5–4 p)	Paradou AC	Biskra
15:30				Stadium: Stade du 18 Février; Attendance: 0 Referee: Abdelmoumen Touabti
	Penalties
	Boukaroum (penalty scored); Dakhia (penalty scored); Renaï (penalty scored); Lakhdari (penalty scored); Khoualed (penalty scored)		(penalty missed) Zorgane; (penalty scored) Messibah; (penalty scored) Kadri; (penalty scored) Mouali; (penalty scored) Bouabta

30 April 2021	Olympique de Médéa	1–0	USM Bel Abbes	Médéa
22:30	Elghomari 51' (pen.)			Stadium: Stade Imam Lyes; Attendance: 0 Referee: Hamza Bouslimani

8 May 2021	JS Saoura	4–0	JSM Skikda	Béchar
22:30	Daoud 26'; Messaoudi 42', 53'; Lahmeri 74' (pen.)			Stadium: Stade 20 Août 1955; Attendance: 0 Referee: Mustapha Bessiri

8 May 2021	USM Alger	2–0	MC Alger	Bologhine
22:30	Opoku 19'; Naidji 90+2'			Stadium: Omar Hamadi Stadium; Attendance: 0 Referee: Lyés Bekouassa

8 May 2021	ES Setif	1–2	WA Tlemcen	Sétif
22:30	Ghacha 6'		Zermane 32'; Lakehal 73'	Stadium: Stade 8 Mai 1945; Attendance: 0 Referee: Hamza Bouslimani

8 May 2021	CR Belouizdad	0–0 (a.e.t.) (2–4 p)	NC Magra	Algiers
22:30				Stadium: Stade du 5 Juillet; Attendance: 0 Referee: Mohamed Saïdi
	Penalties
	Djerrar (penalty scored); Merzougui (penalty missed); Nessakh (penalty scored); Belahouel (penalty missed)		(penalty scored) Bouguèche; (penalty scored) Righi; (penalty scored) Kabri; (penalty scored) Fegas

8 May 2021	JS Kabylie	2–0	NA Hussein Dey	Tizi Ouzou
22:30	Kerroum 67'; Boualia 84'			Stadium: Stade 1er Novembre 1954; Attendance: 0 Referee: Mehdi Abid Charef

== Quarter-finals ==
4 June 2021	NC Magra	2–1	JS Saoura	Magra
16:00	Bouchouareb 21'; Meghazi 90'	Report	Hamidi 50'	Stadium: Boucheligue Brothers Stadium; Attendance: 0 Referee: Hamza Bouslimani

4 June 2021	USM Alger	1–0	Olympique de Médéa	Algiers
17:00	Belkacemi 34'	Report		Stadium: Omar Hamadi Stadium; Attendance: 0 Referee: Lahlou Benbraham

4 June 2021	US Biskra	0–2	JS Kabylie	Biskra
17:45		Report	Tubal 20'; Hamroune 69' (pen.)	Stadium: Complexe Sportif d'El Alia; Attendance: 0 Referee: Nabil Boukhalfa

5 June 2021	MC Oran	0–0 (a.e.t.) (1–4 p)	WA Tlemcen	Oran
17:00		Report		Stadium: Ahmed Zabana Stadium; Attendance: 0 Referee: Mehdi Abid Charef
	Penalties
	Motrani (penalty scored); Ezzemani (penalty missed); Bounoua (penalty missed)		(penalty scored) Aichi; (penalty scored) Amiri; (penalty scored) Nezouani; (penalty scored) Belaribi

== Semi-finals ==
8 June 2021	NC Magra	2–1 (a.e.t.)	USM Alger	Magra
16:00	Ziouache 40'; Bourahla 110'	Report	Beneddine 90+10' (pen.)	Stadium: Boucheligue Brothers Stadium; Attendance: 0 Referee: Mehdi Abid Charef

9 June 2021	JS Kabylie	1–0	WA Tlemcen	Tizi Ouzou
17:30	Tubal 61'	Report		Stadium: Stade 1er Novembre 1954; Attendance: 0 Referee: Abdelali Ibrir

== Final ==
10 August 2021
19:00

NC Magra	2–2 (a.e.t.)	JS Kabylie
Demane 11'; Korichi 93'		Boualia 37'; Haroun 120'
Penalties
Fegaâs (penalty missed); Korichi (penalty missed); Belhamri (penalty scored)	1–4	(penalty scored) Souyad; (penalty scored) Ghanem; (penalty scored) Benchaira; (penalty scored) Boualia

Stade du 5 Juillet, Algiers
Attendance: 0
Referee: Mustapha Ghorbal

== Top goalscorers ==
Rank	Player	Club	Goals
1	(Algeria) Billel Messaoudi	JS Saoura	2
1	(Algeria) Hamza Banouh	NA Hussein Dey	2
1	(Algeria) Merouane Boussalem	NA Hussein Dey	2
1	(Libya) Mohamed Tubal	JS Kabylie	2
1	(Algeria) Tawfiq Elghomari	Olympique de Médéa	2
5	25 players		1
