= 2022–23 NC Magra season =

NC Magra
2022–23 season
- President: Azzedine Bennacer
- Head coach: Azzedine Rahim (from 30 July 2022) (until 11 September 2022); Samir Jouili (from 19 September 2022) (until 24 April 2023); Azzedine Aït Djoudi (from 1 May 2023)
- Stadium: Boucheligue Brothers Stadium
- Ligue 1: 13th
- Algerian Cup: Semi-finals
- Top goalscorer: League: Faik Amrane; Fouad Ghanem (5 goals); All: Faik Amrane (6 goals)
- Biggest win: HB Chelghoum Laïd 0–5 NC Magra
- Biggest defeat: RC Arbaâ 5–1 NC Magra
Home colours	Away colours

The 2022–23 season was NC Magra's 4th consecutive season in the top flight of Algerian football. In addition to the domestic league, NC Magra participated in the Algerian Cup.

== Squad list ==
Players and squad numbers last updated on 5 February 2023.
Note: Flags indicate national team as has been defined under FIFA eligibility rules. Players may hold more than one non-FIFA nationality.

No.	Nat.	Position	Name	Date of Birth (Age)	Signed from
Goalkeepers
1	(Algeria)	GK	Mohamed Tayeb Cherif	12 July 1999 (aged 23)	(Algeria) Youth system
12	(Algeria)	GK	Nafaa Alloui	17 March 1991 (aged 31)	(Algeria) WA Tlemcen
16	(Algeria)	GK	Saber Meddour	28 June 2000 (aged 22)	(Algeria) HB Chelghoum Laïd
Defenders
2	(Algeria)	CB	Tarek Cheurfaoui	28 June 1986 (aged 36)	(Algeria) HB Chelghoum Laïd
4	(Algeria)	CB	Adnene Ladjabi	11 November 1999 (aged 23)	(Algeria) Olympique de Médéa
17	(Algeria)	RB	Billel Bouzid	18 December 1996 (aged 26)	(Algeria) JS Saoura
21	(Algeria)	CB	Riadh Dahmani	25 November 1996 (aged 26)	(Algeria) JS Bordj Ménaïel
24	(Algeria)	LB	Redouane Cherifi	22 February 1993 (aged 29)	Unattached
25	(Algeria)	LB	Hmida Salah	23 May 1992 (aged 30)	(Algeria) A Bou Saâda
Midfielders
8	(Algeria)	MF	Ammar El Orfi	3 November 1998 (aged 24)	(Algeria) JS Kabylie
11	(Algeria)	MF	Hedy Habtoune	2 June 2003 (aged 19)	Unattached
15	(Algeria)	MF	Mohamed Daoud	27 December 1991 (aged 31)	(Algeria) JS Saoura
18	(Algeria)	MF	Billel Hammoud	17 August 1996 (aged 26)	(Algeria) JS Bordj Ménaïel
22	(Algeria)	MF	Mohammed Essaid Bourahla	24 May 1990 (aged 32)	(Algeria) USM Khenchela
Forwards
6	(Algeria)	FW	Mounir Aichi	7 March 1992 (aged 30)	(Algeria) USM Khenchela
7	(Algeria)	FW	Wail Harikeche	19 April 1998 (aged 24)	(Tunisia) US Tataouine
9	(Algeria)	FW	Youcef Djahnit	11 January 1997 (aged 25)	(Algeria) US Biskra
10	(Algeria)	FW	Hamza Banouh	7 May 1990 (aged 32)	(Algeria) NA Hussein Dey
14	(Algeria)	FW	Nadjib Berrabeh	13 March 1999 (aged 23)	(Algeria) CR Témouchent
19	(Algeria)	FW	Chakib Berkani	1 June 1996 (aged 26)	(Algeria) USM Khenchela
20	(Algeria)	ST	Chaker Kaddour Chérif	8 February 1997 (aged 25)	(Algeria) JS Kabylie
23	(Algeria)	FW	Faik Amrane	26 November 1997 (aged 25)	(Algeria) CS Constantine
26	(Algeria)	FW	Laid Saidi	26 April 2000 (aged 22)	(Tunisia) US Tataouine
27	(Algeria)	FW	Hani Gasmi	6 November 1999 (aged 23)	(Algeria) RC Kouba

== Transfers ==
=== In ===
==== Summer ====
Date	Pos	Player	From club	Transfer fee	Source
6 August 2022	LB	(Algeria) Redouane Cherifi	Unattached	Free transfer	
9 August 2022	MF	(Algeria) Ammar El Orfi	JS Kabylie	Free transfer	

==== Winter ====
Date	Pos	Player	From club	Transfer fee	Source
19 January 2023	MF	(Algeria) Mohammed Essaid Bourahla	USM Khenchela	Free transfer	
22 January 2023	FW	(Algeria) Mounir Aichi	USM Khenchela	Free transfer	
31 January 2023	MF	(Algeria) Hedy Habtoune	Unattached	Free transfer	
5 February 2023	FW	(Algeria) Chakib Berkani	USM Khenchela	Free transfer	
5 February 2023	CB	(Algeria) Tarek Cheurfaoui	HB Chelghoum Laïd	Free transfer	

=== Out ===
==== Summer ====
Date	Pos	Player	To club	Transfer fee	Source
28 June 2022	MF	(Algeria) Karm Benkouider	JS Saoura	Free transfer	
1 July 2022	CB	(Algeria) Mohamed Amine Madani	CS Constantine	Free transfer	
24 July 2022	CB	(Algeria) Khaled Nèche	(Saudi Arabia) Al-Qaisumah FC	Free transfer	
26 July 2022	FW	(Algeria) Akram Demane	(Saudi Arabia) Al-Sadd	Free transfer	

==== Winter ====
Date	Pos	Player	To club	Transfer fee	Source
31 January 2023	FW	(Algeria) Ayache Ziouache	ES Mostaganem	Free transfer	
1 February 2023	MF	(Algeria) Fouad Ghanem	ES Sétif	Free transfer	
5 February 2022	CB	(Algeria) Merzak Abaziz	Unattached	Released	
5 February 2022	MF	(Algeria) Walid Hellal	Unattached	Released	
5 February 2022	MF	(Algeria) Laid Ouadji	Unattached	Released	
5 February 2022	MF	(Algeria) Abderrazak Khelifi	Unattached	Released	
5 February 2022	LB	(Algeria) Samir Chaouchi	Unattached	Released	

== Competitions ==
=== Overview ===
Competition	Record								Started round	Final position / round	First match	Last match
Competition	G	W	D	L	GF	GA	GD	Win %	Started round	Final position / round	First match	Last match
Ligue 1	30	11	7	12	35	36	−1	36.67	—N/a	13th	27 August 2022	15 July 2023
Algerian Cup	5	4	0	1	8	3	+5	80.00	Round of 64	Semi-finals	14 February 2023	27 May 2023
Total	35	15	7	13	43	39	+4	42.86				

Updated to match played 15 July 2023
Source: Competitions

=== Ligue 1 ===
==== League table ====
Pos	Team	Pld	W	D	L	GF	GA	GD	Pts	Qualification or relegation
11	USM Alger	30	11	7	12	31	30	+1	40	Qualification for CAF Confederation Cup (Note: USMA Alger qualified for the 2023–24 CAF Confederation Cup as the title holders.)
12	US Biskra	30	10	10	10	30	29	+1	40	
13	NC Magra	30	11	7	12	35	36	−1	40	
14	JS Kabylie	30	10	9	11	35	26	+9	39	
15	RC Arbaâ (R)	30	10	6	14	39	43	−4	36	Relegation to Ligue 2

Updated to match(es) played on 15 July 2023. Source: the-sports.org
Rules for classification: 1) points; 2) head-to-head points; 3) head-to-head goal difference; 4) goal difference; 5) total goals; 6) fairplay ranking; 7) playoff.
(R) Relegated

==== Results summary ====
Overall								Home						Away					
Pld	W	D	L	GF	GA	GD	Pts	W	D	L	GF	GA	GD	W	D	L	GF	GA	GD
30	11	7	12	35	36	−1	40	9	3	3	23	13	+10	2	4	9	12	23	−11

Last updated: 15 July 2023.
Source: Competitive matches

==== Results by round ====
Round	1	2	3	4	5	6	7	8	9	10	11	12	13	14	15	16	17	18	19	20	21	22	23	24	25	26	27	28	29	30
Ground	H	A	H	A	H	A	H	H	A	H	A	H	A	H	A	A	H	A	H	A	H	A	A	H	A	H	A	H	A	H
Result	L	D	L	L	W	D	D	W	L	L	L	D	D	W	W	L	W	L	L	L	W	L	L	D	W	W	D	W	L	W
Position	10	11	12	13	12	14	13	12	13	12	12	13	12	11	10	10	9	9	13	13	11	13	14	14	13	12	12	11	14	13

Updated to match(es) played on 15 July 2023. Source: Competitive matches
A = Away; H = Home; W = Win; D = Draw; L = Loss

==== Matches ====
The league fixtures were announced on 19 July 2022.

27 August 2022 Round 1	NC Magra	1–2	Paradou AC	Magra
16:45	Saidi 78'	Report	Bouzida 11'; Aoued 90+2'	Stadium: Boucheligue Brothers Stadium; Referee: Mehdi Abid Charef

2 September 2022 Round 2	MC Oran	0–0	NC Magra	Oran
20:00		Report		Stadium: Ahmed Zabana Stadium; Referee: Abderrezzak Arab

9 September 2022 Round 3	NC Magra	0–1	ES Sétif	Magra
16:30		Report	Godwin 45+4'	Stadium: Boucheligue Brothers Stadium; Referee: Hamza Bouslimani

16 September 2022 Round 4	MC Alger	2–1	NC Magra	Dar El Beïda
16:30	Tahar 83'; Hamidi 90+5'	Report	Berrabeh 70'	Stadium: Omar Benrabah Stadium; Referee: Mohamed Saidi

24 September 2022 Round 5	NC Magra	1–0	JS Saoura	Magra
16:30	Salah 59'	Report		Stadium: Boucheligue Brothers Stadium; Referee: Abdellah Benchehida

30 September 2022 Round 6	US Biskra	1–1	NC Magra	Biskra
19:00	Baâli 90+2'	Report	Banouh 61'	Stadium: 18 February Stadium; Referee: Billel Soltani

7 October 2022 Round 7	NC Magra	0–0	RC Arbaâ	Magra
15:30		Report		Stadium: Boucheligue Brothers Stadium; Referee: Abderrahmane Mohamed Belkbir

15 October 2022 Round 8	NC Magra	1–0	MC El Bayadh	Magra
15:00	Ziouache 28'	Report		Stadium: Boucheligue Brothers Stadium; Referee: Ali Nader

21 October 2022 Round 9	CR Belouizdad	3–1	NC Magra	Belouizdad
15:00	Mrezigue 63'; Iwuala 80'; Bouguerra 90+5' (pen.)	Report	Banouh 88'	Stadium: 20 August 1955 Stadium; Referee: Youcef Tayeb Bouderbali

5 November 2022 Round 10	NC Magra	4–2	ASO Chlef	Magra
15:00	Amrane 8', 13' (pen.); Ziouache 35'; Ghanem 83' (pen.)	Report	Souibaâh 25' (pen.); Kerroum 52'	Stadium: Boucheligue Brothers Stadium; Referee: Bilal Bendjahane

9 November 2022 Round 11	CS Constantine	1–0	NC Magra	Constantine
15:00	Lakdja 50'	Report		Stadium: Ramadane Ben Abdelmalek Stadium; Referee: Akram Mecharia

29 November 2022 Round 12	NC Magra	1–1	USM Alger	Magra
15:00	Ghanem 66' (pen.)	Report	Radouani 50'	Stadium: Boucheligue Brothers Stadium; Referee: Houssam Benyahia

7 December 2022 Round 13	USM Khenchela	1–1	NC Magra	Khenchela
15:00	Baakoh 6'	Report	Zeghad 32'	Stadium: Amar Hamam Stadium; Referee: Anes Azrine

11 December 2022 Round 14	NC Magra	2–1	JS Kabylie	Magra
15:00	Ghanem 48'; Daoud 67'	Report	Mansouri 45+4'	Stadium: Boucheligue Brothers Stadium; Referee: Abdellah Benchehida

24 December 2022 Round 15	HB Chelghoum Laïd	0–5	NC Magra	Chelghoum Laïd
14:30		Report	Kaddour Chérif 41'; Ghanem 43', 90'; Salah 70'; El Orfi 79'	Stadium: 11 December 1961 Stadium; Referee: Ali Nader

10 February 2023 Round 16	Paradou AC	3–1	NC Magra	Dar El Beïda
15:00	Boulbina 35'; Zerrouki 39' (pen.); Titraoui 56'	Report	Ladjabi 64'	Stadium: Omar Benrabah Stadium; Referee: Mehadji Tayeb Bouderbali

19 February 2023 Round 17	NC Magra	2–0	MC Oran	Magra
15:00	Banouh 23' (pen.); El Orfi 66'	Report		Stadium: Boucheligue Brothers Stadium; Referee: Radouane Alou

25 February 2023 Round 18	ES Sétif	2–0	NC Magra	Sétif
17:00	Enow 50'; Guenaoui 70'	Report		Stadium: 8 May 1945 Stadium; Referee: Anes Azrine

31 March 2023 Round 21	NC Magra	2–1	US Biskra	Magra
15:45	Ladjabi 21'; Djahnit 56'	Report	Baâli 54'	Stadium: Boucheligue Brothers Stadium; Referee: Mohamed Belkbir

7 April 2023 Round 22	RC Arbaâ	5–1	NC Magra	Larbaâ
15:45	Toumi 23', 57' (pen.); Deghmani 30'; Benboulaid 52'; Aït Ali 79'	Report	Amrane 19'	Stadium: Ismaïl Makhlouf Stadium; Referee: Lotfi Bekouassa

11 April 2023 Round 19	NC Magra	0–1	MC Alger	Magra
15:45		Report	Ghezala 52'	Stadium: Boucheligue Brothers Stadium; Referee: Ali Nader

18 April 2023 Round 20	JS Saoura	2–0	NC Magra	Béchar
22:00	Lahmeri 21'; Doucene 66'	Report		Stadium: 20 August 1955 Stadium; Referee: Anes Azrine

18 May 2023 Round 23	MC El Bayadh	1–0	NC Magra	El Bayadh
16:00	Balegh 83'	Report		Stadium: Zakaria Medjdoub Stadium; Referee: Billel Soltani

31 May 2023 Round 24	NC Magra	0–0	CR Belouizdad	Magra
16:00		Report		Stadium: Boucheligue Brothers Stadium; Referee: Mohamed Bouteraa

6 June 2023 Round 25	ASO Chlef	0–1	NC Magra	Chlef
16:30		Report	Bourahla 45+1'	Stadium: Mohamed Boumezrag Stadium; Referee: Hamza Bouslimani

1 July 2023 Round 26	NC Magra	2–1	CS Constantine	Magra
17:00	Bourahla 2'; Amrane 55' (pen.)	Report	Zaalani 28'	Stadium: Boucheligue Brothers Stadium; Referee: Lahlou Benbraham

4 July 2023 Round 27	USM Alger	0–0	NC Magra	Rouïba
17:00		Report		Stadium: Salem Mabrouki Stadium; Referee: Bilal Bendjahene

7 July 2023 Round 28	NC Magra	2–1	USM Khenchela	Magra
17:15	Salah 22'; Saidi 62' (pen.)	Report	Baakoh 89'	Stadium: Boucheligue Brothers Stadium; Referee: Masinissa Serjane

10 July 2023 Round 29	JS Kabylie	2–0	NC Magra	Tizi Ouzou
17:15	Boualia 37'; Mouaki 77'	Report		Stadium: 1 November 1954 Stadium; Referee: Akram Mechairia

15 July 2023 Round 30	NC Magra	5–2	HB Chelghoum Laïd	Magra
17:15	Amrane 4' (pen.); Kaddour Chérif 5', 8'; Saidi 38'; Atallah 88'	Report	Bouzidi 7'; Bekhouche 84'	Stadium: Boucheligue Brothers Stadium; Referee: Boubekeur Zouaoui

=== Algerian Cup ===
14 February 2023 Round of 64	NC Magra	2–0	MC Alger	Magra
14:00	Salah 60'; Berrabeh 90'	Report		Stadium: Boucheligue Brothers Stadium; Referee: Mohamed Bouteraa
Note: Lineups for NC Magra - Cherif, Bouzid, Salah, Driss, Zeghad, El Orfi, Daoud, Amrane, Djahnit, Berrabeh, Banouh.

3 March 2023 Round of 32	CRB El Milia	1–2 (a.e.t.)	NC Magra	Jijel
14:00	Bitat 90+6' (pen.)	Report	Demigha 15' (o.g.); Djahnit 101'	Stadium: Hocine Rouibah Stadium; Referee: Ali Nader
Note: Lineups for NC Magra - Cherif, Cheurfaoui, Ladjabi, Dahmani (Bouzid, 110'), Salah, El Orfi, Bourahla (Hammoud, 110'), Daoud, Saidi (Aichi, 78'), Berrabeh (Djahniti, 60'), Banouh (Gasmi, 78').

28 April 2023 Round of 16	JS Bordj Ménaïel	1–3	NC Magra	Boumerdès
15:00	Gali	Report	Bourahla; Kaddour Chérif; Amrane	Stadium: Djilali Bounaama Stadium; Referee: Houssam Benyahia
Note: Lineups for NC Magra - Meddour, Cheurfaoui, Driss, Salah, Dahmani, El Orfi (Djahniti, 60'), Bourahla, Daoud, Amrane, Saidi, Banouh. (Kaddour Chérif, ')

12 May 2023 Quarter-finals	CR Zaouia	0–1	NC Magra	Blida
16:00		Report	Daoud 60'	Stadium: Brakni Brothers Stadium; Referee: Redouane Allou
Note: Lineups for NC Magra - Cherif, Cheurfaoui, Zeghad, Salah, Dahmani, El Orfi, Bourahla, Daoud, Berrabeh, Djahniti, Banouh.

27 May 2023 Semi-finals	NC Magra	0–1	CR Belouizdad	Constantine
18:00		Report	Boussouf 7'	Stadium: Mohamed Hamlaoui Stadium; Referee: Youcef Gamouh
Note: Lineups for NC Magra - Cherif, Driss, Zeghad, Ladjabi (El Orfi, 77'), Dahmani, Cherifi (Bouzid, 46'), Bourahla, Amrane (Atallah, 85'), Aichi, Berrabeh (Djahniti, 72'), Banouh (Kaddour Chérif, 72').

== Squad information ==
=== Playing statistics ===
No.	Pos	Nat	Player	Total		Ligue 1		Algerian Cup	
No.	Pos	Nat	Player	Apps	Goals	Apps	Goals	Apps	Goals
Goalkeepers
1	GK	(Algeria) ALG	Mohamed Tayeb Cherif	20	0	16	0	4	0
12	GK	(Algeria) ALG	Nafaa Alloui	4	0	4	0	0	0
16	GK	(Algeria) ALG	Saber Meddour	11	0	10	0	1	0
Defenders
2	DF	(Algeria) ALG	Tarek Cheurfaoui	10	0	7	0	3	0
4	DF	(Algeria) ALG	Adnene Ladjabi	19	2	17	2	2	0
17	DF	(Algeria) ALG	Billel Bouzid	23	0	20	0	3	0
21	DF	(Algeria) ALG	Riadh Dahmani	19	0	15	0	4	0
24	DF	(Algeria) ALG	Redouane Cherifi	9	0	8	0	1	0
25	DF	(Algeria) ALG	Hmida Salah	28	4	24	3	4	1
34	DF	(Algeria) ALG	Yacine Zeghad	23	1	20	1	3	0
62	DF	(Algeria) ALG	Abdelhamid Driss	17	0	14	0	3	0
Midfielders
8	FW	(Algeria) ALG	Ammar El Orfi	28	2	23	2	5	0
11	MF	(Algeria) ALG	Hedy Habtoune	1	0	1	0	0	0
15	FW	(Algeria) ALG	Mohamed Daoud	31	2	27	1	4	1
18	FW	(Algeria) ALG	Billel Hammoud	7	0	6	0	1	0
22	MF	(Algeria) ALG	Mohammed Essaid Bourahla	19	3	15	2	4	1
44	MF	(Algeria) ALG	Ilyes Atallah	9	0	8	0	1	0
Forwards
6	FW	(Algeria) ALG	Mounir Aichi	11	0	9	0	2	0
7	FW	(Algeria) ALG	Wail Harikeche	0	0	0	0	0	0
9	FW	(Algeria) ALG	Youcef Djahnit	22	2	17	1	5	1
10	FW	(Algeria) ALG	Hamza Banouh	24	3	19	3	5	0
14	FW	(Algeria) ALG	Nadjib Berrabeh	26	2	22	1	4	1
19	FW	(Algeria) ALG	Chakib Berkani	2	0	2	0	0	0
20	FW	(Algeria) ALG	Chaker Kaddour Chérif	16	4	14	3	2	1
23	FW	(Algeria) ALG	Faik Amrane	20	6	17	5	3	1
26	FW	(Algeria) ALG	Laid Saidi	20	3	18	3	2	0
27	FW	(Algeria) ALG	Hani Gasmi	4	0	3	0	1	0
Players transferred out during the season
3	DF	(Algeria) ALG	Samir Chaouchi	3	0	3	0	0	0
13	DF	(Algeria) ALG	Ayache Ziouache	13	2	13	2	0	0
22	DF	(Algeria) ALG	Merzak Abaziz	11	0	11	0	0	0
5	FW	(Algeria) ALG	Walid Hellal	3	0	3	0	0	0
6	FW	(Algeria) ALG	Abderrazak Khelifi	2	0	2	0	0	0
11	FW	(Algeria) ALG	Fouad Ghanem	14	5	14	5	0	0
19	MF	(Algeria) ALG	Laid Ouadji	1	0	1	0	0	0

Last updated: 15 July 2023
Source: soccerway.com

=== Goalscorers ===
As of 15 July 2023

Includes all competitive matches. The list is sorted alphabetically by surname when total goals are equal.

No.	Nat.	Player	Pos.	L 1	AC	TOTAL
23	(Algeria)	Faik Amrane	FW	5	1	6
11	(Algeria)	Fouad Ghanem	MF	5	0	5
20	(Algeria)	Chaker Kaddour Chérif	FW	3	1	4
25	(Algeria)	Hmida Salah	DF	3	1	4
10	(Algeria)	Hamza Banouh	FW	3	0	3
26	(Algeria)	Laid Saidi	FW	3	0	3
22	(Algeria)	Mohammed Essaid Bourahla	MF	2	1	3
13	(Algeria)	Ayache Ziouache	DF	2	0	2
14	(Algeria)	Nadjib Berrabeh	FW	1	1	2
8	(Algeria)	Ammar El Orfi	MF	2	0	2
4	(Algeria)	Abdelhamid Ladjabi	DF	2	0	2
9	(Algeria)	Youcef Djahnit	FW	1	1	2
15	(Algeria)	Mohamed Daoud	MF	1	1	2
34	(Algeria)	Yacine Zeghad	DF	1	0	1
44	(Algeria)	Ilyes Atallah	DF	1	0	1
Own Goals				0	1	1
Totals				35	8	33
