= 2023–24 NC Magra season =

NC Magra
2023–24 season
- President: Azzedine Bennacer
- Head coach: Aziz Abbès (from 13 August 2023) (until 25 September 2023); Farouk Janhaoui (from 30 September 2023) (until 20 December 2023); Atef Bettira (from 20 December 2023) (until 14 February 2024); Lyamine Bougherara (from 14 February 2024)
- Stadium: Boucheligue Brothers Stadium
- Ligue 1: 12th
- Algerian Cup: Round of 64
- Top goalscorer: League: Hamza Demane (10 goals); All: Hamza Demane (10 goals)
- Biggest win: NC Magra 3–1 ES Ben Aknoun
- Biggest defeat: MC Alger 4–0 NC Magra
Home colours	Away colours	Third colours

The 2023–24 season, is NC Magra's 5th consecutive season in the top flight of Algerian football. In addition to the domestic league, NC Magra are participating in the Algerian Cup.

== Squad list ==
Players and squad numbers last updated on 5 February 2024.
Note: Flags indicate national team as has been defined under FIFA eligibility rules. Players may hold more than one non-FIFA nationality.

No.	Nat.	Position	Name	Date of Birth (Age)	Signed from
Goalkeepers
1	(Algeria)	GK	Mohamed Tayeb Cherif	12 July 1999 (aged 24)	(Algeria) Youth system
13	(Algeria)	GK	Abdelkader Salhi	19 March 1993 (aged 30)	Unattached
16	(Algeria)	GK	Salaheddine Chemouri	13 August 2001 (aged 22)	(Algeria) Youth system
Defenders
3	(Algeria)	LB	Moncef Merouani	19 October 2000 (aged 22)	(Algeria) Olympique de Médéa
4	(Algeria)	CB	Chemseddine Lakehal	29 February 2000 (aged 23)	(Algeria) WA Tlemcen
5	(Algeria)	CB	M'Hamed Merouani	29 March 1987 (aged 36)	Free agent
17	(Algeria)	RB	Aymen Attou	8 October 1997 (aged 25)	(Algeria) USM Khenchela
18	(Algeria)	CB	Ibrahim Bekakchi	10 January 1992 (aged 31)	(Algeria) US Souf
21	(Algeria)	RB	Amir Laidouni	20 September 1999 (aged 23)	(Algeria) Olympique de Médéa
22	(Algeria)	CB	Mohamed Achref Aib	24 May 1990 (aged 33)	(Algeria) USM Khenchela
25	(Algeria)	LB	Sabri Cheraitia	23 March 1996 (aged 27)	Free agent
Midfielders
6	(Algeria)	MF	Zakaria Kemoukh	6 March 1992 (aged 31)	(Algeria) CS Constantine
8	(Algeria)	MF	Karm Benkouider	31 March 1999 (aged 24)	(Algeria) JS Saoura
12	(Algeria)	MF	Alouane Benharat	22 December 1996 (aged 26)	(Libya) Al-Nsoor SC
14	(Algeria)	MF	Foued Hadded	1 November 1990 (aged 32)	(Algeria) USM Khenchela
19	(Algeria)	MF	Chakib Berkani	1 June 1996 (aged 27)	(Algeria) USM Khenchela
24	(Algeria)	MF	Mohammed Essaid Bourahla	24 May 1990 (aged 33)	(Algeria) USM Khenchela
Forwards
7	(Algeria)	FW	Yanis Boughanem	23 May 1997 (aged 26)	(Algeria) IB Khémis El Khechna
11	(Algeria)	FW	Hamza Demane	23 February 1989 (aged 34)	(Algeria) CS Constantine
15	(Algeria)	FW	Mounib Benmerzoug	6 June 1995 (aged 28)	(Algeria) CA Batna
20	(Algeria)	FW	Bouzid Dadache	27 September 1993 (aged 29)	(Libya) Al-Nasr
23	(Algeria)	FW	Nasreddine Bouldjedri	29 February 2000 (aged 23)	(Algeria) CS Constantine
26	(Algeria)	FW	Laid Saidi	26 April 2000 (aged 23)	(Tunisia) US Tataouine
27	(Algeria)	FW	Imad Moussaoui	26 November 2000 (aged 22)	(Algeria) MC El Bayadh

== Transfers ==
=== In ===
==== Summer ====
Date	Pos	Player	Moving from	Fee	Source
13 August 2023	DF	(Algeria) Achref Aïb	USM Khenchela	Free transfer	
13 August 2023	DF	(Algeria) Amir Laidouni	Olympique de Médéa	Free transfer	
13 August 2023	GK	(Algeria) Abdelkader Salhi	Free agent	Free transfer	
16 August 2023	DF	(Algeria) Moncef Merouani	Olympique de Médéa	Free transfer	
16 August 2023	FW	(Algeria) Sid Ali Lakroum	(Saudi Arabia) Al-Nahda	Free transfer	
19 August 2023	MF	(Algeria) Foued Hadded	USM Khenchela	Free transfer	
30 August 2023	DF	(Algeria) Chemseddine Lakehal	WA Tlemcen	Free transfer	
10 September 2023	MF	(Algeria) Bassem Chaouti	ES Sétif	Free transfer	

==== Winter ====
Date	Pos	Player	Moving from	Fee	Source
31 January 2024	DF	(Algeria) M'Hamed Merouani	Free agent	Free transfer	
31 January 2024	MF	(Algeria) Zakaria Kemoukh	CS Constantine	Free transfer	
31 January 2024	FW	(Algeria) Mounib Benmerzoug	CA Batna	Free transfer	
5 February 2024	DF	(Algeria) Ibrahim Bekakchi	US Souf	Free transfer	
5 February 2024	DF	(Algeria) Sabri Cheraitia	Free agent	Free transfer	

=== Out ===
==== Summer ====
Date	Pos	Player	Moving to	Fee	Source
19 July 2023	FW	(Algeria) Faïk Amrane	JS Kabylie	Free transfer	
9 August 2023	DF	(Algeria) Abdelhamid Driss	JS Kabylie	Free transfer	
13 August 2023	GK	(Algeria) Saber Meddour	US Biskra	Free transfer	
19 August 2023	MF	(Algeria) Ammar El Orfi	MC Alger	Free transfer	

==== Winter ====
Date	Pos	Player	Moving to	Fee	Source
1 January 2024	DF	(Algeria) Tarek Cheurfaoui	Free agent	Free transfer (Released)	
1 January 2024	FW	(Algeria) Sid Ali Lakroum	Free agent	Free transfer (Released)	
3 January 2024	MF	(Algeria) Bassem Chaouti	Free agent	Free transfer (Released)	
30 January 2024	DF	(Algeria) Hmida Salah	MC Oran	Undisclosed	
31 January 2024	DF	(Algeria) Hocine Laribi	USM Khenchela	Free transfer	
5 February 2024	MF	(Algeria) Ilyes Atallah	JS Saoura	Free transfer	

== Competitions ==
=== Overview ===
Competition	Record								Started round	Final position / round	First match	Last match
Competition	G	W	D	L	GF	GA	GD	Win %	Started round	Final position / round	First match	Last match
Ligue 1	30	9	11	10	30	32	−2	30.00	—N/a	12th	16 September 2023	14 June 2024
Algerian Cup	1	0	0	1	0	2	−2	0.00	Round of 64	Round of 64	4 February 2024	4 February 2024
Total	31	9	11	11	30	34	−4	29.03				

Updated to match played 14 June 2024
Source: Competitions

=== Ligue 1 ===
==== League table ====
Pos	Team	Pld	W	D	L	GF	GA	GD	Pts
10	USM Khenchela	30	11	6	13	33	39	−6	39
11	MC El Bayadh	30	10	8	12	29	30	−1	38
12	NC Magra	30	9	11	10	30	32	−2	38
13	MC Oran	30	9	9	12	26	33	−7	36
14	US Biskra	30	9	9	12	25	34	−9	36

Source: the-sports.org
Rules for classification: 1) points; 2) head-to-head points; 3) head-to-head goal difference; 4) goal difference; 5) total goals; 6) fairplay ranking; 7) playoff.

==== Results summary ====
Overall								Home						Away					
Pld	W	D	L	GF	GA	GD	Pts	W	D	L	GF	GA	GD	W	D	L	GF	GA	GD
30	9	11	10	30	32	−2	38	5	6	4	17	14	+3	4	5	6	13	18	−5

Last updated: 14 June 2024.
Source: Competitive matches

==== Results by round ====
Round	1	2	3	4	5	6	7	8	9	10	11	12	13	14	15	16	17	18	19	20	21	22	23	24	25	26	27	28	29	30
Ground	H	A	H	A	H	A	H	A	H	A	H	H	A	H	A	A	H	A	H	A	H	A	H	A	H	A	A	H	A	H
Result	L	L	W	D	W	W	D	L	D	L	W	L	D	D	L	L	D	W	D	L	L	W	D	D	W	W	D	W	D	L
Position	11	15	12	11	9	6	5	10	11	13	12	13	12	12	12	13	13	12	13	13	13	12	14	13	13	10	11	10	11	12

Updated to match(es) played on 14 June 2024. Source: Competitive matches
A = Away; H = Home; W = Win; D = Draw; L = Loss

==== Matches ====
The league fixtures were announced on 24 August 2023.

All times are local, WAT (UTC+1).

Win Draw Loss Postponed

16 September 2023 Round 1	NC Magra	0–1	JS Kabylie	Magra
16:00		Report	Boukhanchouche 44'	Stadium: Boucheligue Brothers Stadium; Referee: Nabil Boukhalfa

23 September 2023 Round 2	CR Belouizdad	1–0	NC Magra	Belouizdad
16:00	Boussouf 90+7'	Report		Stadium: 20 August 1955 Stadium; Referee: Mehadji Tayeb Bouderbali

29 September 2023 Round 3	NC Magra	2–1	US Biskra	Magra
15:45	Dadache 61'; Saidi 83'	Report	Baâli 27'	Stadium: Boucheligue Brothers Stadium; Referee: Redouane Allou

7 October 2023 Round 4	MC Oran	0–0	NC Magra	Bir El Djir
19:00		Report		Stadium: Miloud Hadefi Stadium; Referee: Anes Azrine

11 November 2023 Round 5	NC Magra	3–1	ES Ben Aknoun	Magra
15:00	Hadded 45+5' (pen.); Demane 62'; Saidi 87'	Report	Zaouche 45+1'	Stadium: Boucheligue Brothers Stadium; Referee: Abdelmoumen Touabti

17 November 2023 Round 6	CS Constantine	0–1	NC Magra	Constantine
15:30		Report	Bourahla 70'	Stadium: Ramadane Ben Abdelmalek Stadium; Referee: Mohamed Belkebir

24 November 2023 Round 7	NC Magra	1–1	MC El Bayadh	Magra
15:15	Khemaissia 63' (o.g.)	Report	Ghenam 75'	Stadium: Boucheligue Brothers Stadium; Referee: Akram Mechairia

1 December 2023 Round 8	MC Alger	4–0	NC Magra	Algiers
16:45	Bayazid 6', 37'; Naidji 23'; Merzougui 81'	Report		Stadium: Stade du 5 Juillet; Referee: Houssam Benyahia

9 December 2023 Round 9	NC Magra	1–1	ASO Chlef	Magra
15:00	Bourahla 12'	Report	Kerroum 54'	Stadium: Boucheligue Brothers Stadium; Referee: Abderahmane Sahraoui

16 December 2023 Round 10	JS Saoura	2–1	NC Magra	Béchar
17:00	Saâd 41'; Bellatreche 90+5' (pen.)	Report	Demane 61'	Stadium: 20 August 1955 Stadium; Referee: Mohamed Lamine Chaoubi

29 December 2023 Round 11	NC Magra	1–0	US Souf	Magra
15:15	Demane 64' (pen.)	Report		Stadium: Boucheligue Brothers Stadium; Referee: Billel Soltani

5 January 2024 Round 12	NC Magra	0–1	ES Sétif	Magra
15:15		Report	Lahmeri 61' (pen.)	Stadium: Boucheligue Brothers Stadium; Referee: Anes Azrine

12 January 2024 Round 13	Paradou AC	0–0	NC Magra	Dar El Beïda
15:15		Report		Stadium: Omar Benrabah Stadium; Referee: Alaa Bouab

19 January 2024 Round 14	NC Magra	1–1	USM Khenchela	Magra
15:30	Laidouni 90+6'	Report	Guemroud 65'	Stadium: Boucheligue Brothers Stadium; Referee: Mohamed Belkebir

28 January 2024 Round 15	USM Alger	3–1	NC Magra	Algiers
18:00	Djahnit 33'; Radouani 62' (pen.); Merili 68'	Report	Bourahla 67'	Stadium: Stade du 5 Juillet; Referee: Mehadji Tayeb Bouderbal

10 February 2024 Round 16	JS Kabylie	1–0	NC Magra	Tizi Ouzou
16:00	Mouaki 47'	Report		Stadium: 1 November 1954 Stadium; Referee: Mohamed Chaoubi

23 February 2024 Round 18	US Biskra	0–1	NC Magra	Biskra
16:00	Demane 31'	Report		Stadium: 18 February Stadium; Referee: Yahia Dahar

1 March 2024 Round 19	NC Magra	1–1	MC Oran	Magra
16:00	Merouani 32'	Report	Dahar 89'	Stadium: Boucheligue Brothers Stadium; Referee: Lahlou Benbraham

15 March 2024 Round 20	ES Ben Aknoun	3–1	NC Magra	Belouizdad
15:30	Haroun 31'; Hadji 69'; Guennoune 84'	Report	Kemoukh 44'	Stadium: 20 August 1955 Stadium; Referee: Mohamed Bouteraa

19 March 2024 Round 17	NC Magra	0–0	CR Belouizdad	Magra
15:30		Report		Stadium: Boucheligue Brothers Stadium; Referee: Houssam Benyahia

24 March 2024 Round 21	NC Magra	2–3	CS Constantine	Magra
15:30	Bourahla 34', 63'	Report	Temine 16'; Khaldi 26', 41'	Stadium: Boucheligue Brothers Stadium; Referee: Billel Soltani

5 April 2024 Round 22	MC El Bayadh	0–2	NC Magra	El Bayadh
15:45		Report	Demane 74'; Moussaoui 90+6'	Stadium: Zakaria Medjdoub Stadium; Referee: Mohamed Saidi

19 April 2024 Round 23	NC Magra	0–0	MC Alger	Magra
16:00		Report		Stadium: Boucheligue Brothers Stadium; Referee: Abdelmoumen Touabti

27 April 2024 Round 24	ASO Chlef	2–2	NC Magra	Chlef
16:00	Nessakh 29'; Agbagno 34'	Report	Demane 13'; Boughanem 90+4'	Stadium: Mohamed Boumezrag Stadium; Referee: Alaa Bouab

11 May 2024 Round 25	NC Magra	1–0	JS Saoura	Magra
17:00	Dadache 82'	Report		Stadium: Boucheligue Brothers Stadium; Referee: Anes Azrine

17 May 2024 Round 26	US Souf	0–2	NC Magra	El Oued
17:00		Report	Demane 90'; Boughanem 81'	Stadium: 1 November 1954 Stadium; Referee: Fateh Harkat

26 May 2024 Round 27	ES Sétif	0–0	NC Magra	Sétif
16:45		Report		Stadium: 8 May 1945 Stadium; Referee: Mohamed Beloufa

7 June 2024 Round 28	NC Magra	2–0	Paradou AC	Magra
16:45	Demane 17'; Kemoukh 45+2'	Report		Stadium: Boucheligue Brothers Stadium; Referee: Abderahmane Sahraoui

11 June 2024 Round 29	USM Khenchela	2–2	NC Magra	Khenchela
16:45	Sabouni 9', 54'	Report	Dadache 55'; Demane 64'	Stadium: Amar Hamam Stadium; Referee: Lotfi Bekouassa

14 June 2024 Round 30	NC Magra	2–3	USM Alger	Magra
16:45	Berkane 45+5'; Demane 76'	Report	Belkacemi 71' (pen.); Boukhanchouche 81'; Ateba 86'	Stadium: Boucheligue Brothers Stadium; Referee: Mohamed Amine Benzohra

=== Algerian Cup ===
4 February 2024 Round of 64	NC Magra	0–2	CS Constantine	Magra
13:45		Report	Belhocini 38'; Chekal 90+3'	Stadium: Boucheligue Brothers Stadium; Referee: Lyes Bekouassa
Note: NC Magra Lineups: Salhi, Lakehal, Aib, Attou, Merouani, Hadded (substituted off) 72' (Benmerzoug (substituted on) 72'), Kemoukh, Bourahla, Bouldjedri (substituted off) 72' (Demane (substituted on) 72'), Moussaoui (substituted off) 79' (Boughanem (substituted on) 79'), Dadache.

== Squad information ==
=== Playing statistics ===
No.	Pos	Nat	Player	Total		Ligue 1		Algerian Cup	
No.	Pos	Nat	Player	Apps	Goals	Apps	Goals	Apps	Goals
Goalkeepers
1	GK	(Algeria) ALG	Mohamed Tayeb Cherif	11	0	11	0	0	0
13	GK	(Algeria) ALG	Abdelkader Salhi	18	0	17	0	1	0
16	GK	(Algeria) ALG	Salaheddine Chemouri	2	0	2	0	0	0
Defenders
3	DF	(Algeria) ALG	Moncef Merouani	20	0	19	0	1	0
4	DF	(Algeria) ALG	Chemseddine Lakehal	16	0	15	0	1	0
5	DF	(Algeria) ALG	M'Hamed Merouani	8	1	8	1	0	0
17	DF	(Algeria) ALG	Aymen Attou	20	0	19	0	1	0
18	DF	(Algeria) ALG	Ibrahim Bekakchi	13	0	13	0	0	0
21	DF	(Algeria) ALG	Amir Laidouni	10	1	10	1	0	0
22	DF	(Algeria) ALG	Achref Aïb	8	0	7	0	1	0
25	DF	(Algeria) ALG	Sabri Cheraitia	5	0	5	0	0	0
28	DF	(Algeria) ALG	Ismail Ghanemi	12	0	12	0	0	0
42	DF	(Algeria) ALG	Yahia Benamer	2	0	2	0	0	0
Midfielders
6	MF	(Algeria) ALG	Zakaria Kemoukh	15	2	14	2	1	0
8	MF	(Algeria) ALG	Karm Benkouider	14	0	14	0	0	0
12	MF	(Algeria) ALG	Alouane Benharat	11	1	11	1	0	0
14	MF	(Algeria) ALG	Foued Hadded	26	1	25	1	1	0
19	MF	(Algeria) ALG	Chakib Berkani	12	0	12	0	0	0
24	MF	(Algeria) ALG	Mohammed Essaid Bourahla	24	5	23	5	1	0
31	MF	(Algeria) ALG	Mostafa Berkane	24	1	24	1	0	0
Forwards
7	FW	(Algeria) ALG	Yanis Boughanem	20	2	19	2	1	0
11	FW	(Algeria) ALG	Hamza Demane	28	10	27	10	1	0
15	FW	(Algeria) ALG	Mounib Benmerzoug	6	0	5	0	1	0
20	FW	(Algeria) ALG	Bouzid Dadache	17	3	16	3	1	0
23	FW	(Algeria) ALG	Nasreddine Bouldjedri	18	0	17	0	1	0
26	FW	(Algeria) ALG	Laid Saidi	22	2	22	2	0	0
27	FW	(Algeria) ALG	Imad Moussaoui	14	1	13	1	1	0
51	FW	(Algeria) ALG	Mohammed Djaidja	2	0	2	0	0	0
Players transferred out during the season
2	DF	(Algeria) ALG	Tarek Cheurfaoui	5	0	5	0	0	0
18	DF	(Algeria) ALG	Hocine Laribi	6	0	6	0	0	0
25	DF	(Algeria) ALG	Hmida Salah	15	0	15	0	0	0
5	MF	(Algeria) ALG	Bassem Chaouti	2	0	2	0	0	0
6	MF	(Algeria) ALG	Ilyes Atallah	3	0	3	0	0	0
15	FW	(Algeria) ALG	Sid Ali Lakroum	8	0	8	0	0	0

Last updated: 14 June 2024
Source: soccerway.com

=== Goalscorers ===
As of 14 June 2024

Includes all competitive matches. The list is sorted alphabetically by surname when total goals are equal.

No.	Nat.	Player	Pos.	L 1	AC	TOTAL
11	(Algeria)	Hamza Demane	FW	10	0	10
24	(Algeria)	Mohammed Essaid Bourahla	MF	5	0	5
20	(Algeria)	Bouzid Dadache	FW	3	0	3
26	(Algeria)	Laid Saidi	FW	2	0	2
7	(Algeria)	Yanis Boughanem	FW	2	0	2
6	(Algeria)	Zakaria Kemoukh	MF	2	0	2
14	(Algeria)	Foued Hadded	MF	1	0	1
21	(Algeria)	Amir Laidouni	DF	1	0	1
5	(Algeria)	M'Hamed Merouani	DF	1	0	1
17	(Algeria)	Imad Moussaoui	FW	1	0	1
31	(Algeria)	Mostafa Berkane	MF	1	0	1
Own Goals				1	0	1
Totals				30	0	30
