= Katchoo =

Katchoo may refer to:

- Katina "Katchoo" Choovanski, a character in the comic book Strangers in Paradise
- "Katchoo", a 1969 episode of The Brady Bunch

== See also ==
- Katchou (1963–2009), Algerian singer
