= Aïn Touta District =

Aïn Touta District دائرة عين التوتة ⵉⵏ ⵜⵓⵜⴰ
- District

- Location within Algeria
- Coordinates: 35°23′N 5°54′E
- Country: Algeria
- Province: Batna Province
- District seat: Aïn Touta

Population (2008)
  - Total: 125,000
- Time zone: UTC+1 (CET)

Aïn Touta District is a district of Batna Province, Algeria.

== Municipalities ==
The district further divides into four municipalities:

- Aïn Touta
- Ben Foudhala El Hakania
- Maâfa
- Ouled Aouf
