= Abderrezak Bitam =

Algerian football player (born 1989)

Personal information
- Full name: Abderrezak Bitam
- Date of birth: April 18, 1989 (age 37)
- Place of birth: Aïn Touta, Algeria
- Position: Defender

Team information
- Current team: MO Constantine
- Number: 5

Youth career
- –2008: MSP Batna

Senior career*
Years	Team	Apps	(Gls)
2008–2011	MSP Batna	26	(0)
2011–2012	JS Kabylie	14	(0)
2012–2015	CA Batna	3	(1)
2015–2016	RC Relizane	26	(0)
2016–2017	CA Batna	14	(1)
2017–2018	USM El Harrach	12	(0)
2018–2021	AS Aïn M'lila	80	(3)
2021–2022	NC Magra	19	(0)
2022–2026	MSP Batna	0	(0)
2026–	MO Constantine	0	(0)

International career^{‡}
2007	Algeria U20	1	(0)
2010–	Algeria U23	17	(0)
- * Club domestic league appearances and goals as of 14 September 2026 ‡ National team caps and goals as of 00:00, 30 November 2011 (UTC)

Abderrezak Bitam (Arabic: عبد الرزاق بيطام; born April 18, 1989) is an Algerian football player who is currently playing for MO Constantine.

== International career ==
On November 16, 2011, Bitam was selected as part of Algeria's squad for the 2011 CAF U-23 Championship in Morocco.
