= Boualem Benmalek =

Algerian footballer (born 1989)

Personal information
- Full name: Boualem Benmalek
- Date of birth: 30 January 1989 (age 37)
- Place of birth: Sétif, Algeria
- Height: 1.87 m (6 ft 2 in)
- Position: Goalkeeper

Team information
- Current team: NC Magra
- Number: 30

Senior career*
Years	Team	Apps	(Gls)
2009–2011	ES Sétif	2	(0)
2011–2013	AS Khroub	75	(0)
2013–2014	MSP Batna	27	(0)
2014–2015	US Chaouia	27	(0)
2015–2016	MO Constantine	27	(0)
2016–2017	AS Aïn M'lila	27	(0)
2017–2019	USM Annaba	27	(0)
2019–	NC Magra		

International career
2007–2008	Algeria U20	2	(0)
2010–	Algeria U23	4	(0)
- * Club domestic league appearances and goals as of 00:00, 2 August 2019 (UTC)

Boualem Benmalek (born 30 January 1989) is an Algerian professional footballer. He is currently a free agent in the Algerian Ligue Professionnelle 2.

== International career ==
On 16 November 2011 Benmalek was selected as part of Algeria's squad for the 2011 CAF U-23 Championship in Morocco.
