= Maâfa =

Coordinates: 35°16′N 5°54′E

Maafa, Algeria معافة
- Country: Algeria
- Province: Batna
- District: Aïn Touta

Area
  - Total: 173.5 km^{2} (67.0 sq mi)

Population (2008)
  - Total: 2,880
  - Density: 16.6/km^{2} (43.0/sq mi)
- Time zone: UTC+1 (West Africa Time)

Maafa, Algeria is a town in north-eastern Algeria.

== Localities of the commune ==
The commune of Maafa is composed of 5 localities:

- Barbat
- Izmouren
- Maafa
- Moulia (Timhadjaret)
- Tasserghinet
