= Ben Foudhala El Hakania =

Coordinates: 35°21′09″N 6°01′04″E

Ben Foudhala El Hakania بنى فضالة الحقانية
- Country: Algeria
- Province: Batna
- District: Aïn Touta

Area
  - Total: 154 km^{2} (59 sq mi)

Population (2008)
  - Total: 1,511
  - Density: 9.81/km^{2} (25.4/sq mi)
- Time zone: UTC+1 (West Africa Time)

Ben Foudhala El Hakania is a town in north-eastern Algeria.

== Localities of the commune ==
The commune of Aïn Touta is composed of 15 localities:

- Affla
- Akkar, chef-lieu de la commune
- Belgrou
- Bousselem
- Djabroun
- Draa El Djebs
- Es Smail
- Foughala
- Karkar
- Ouabdallah
- Taghrout
- Taghrout Ouziane
- Tahta (Timhadjaret)
- Talghmat
- Tarkiket
