= Katchou =

- Birth name: Ali Nasri
- Born: April 15, 1963; Batna, Algeria
- Died: August 12, 2009 (aged 46); Ain Touta, Batna, Algeria
- Genres: Staifi, Chaoui
- Occupation(s): Singer, songwriter
- Instrument: Vocals
- Years active: 1980–2009

Katchou (real name Ali Nasri) was an Algerian singer, born on April 15, 1963, in Batna.

== Career ==
He sang in Chaoui. He has published at least eight albums, and the following are regarded as the most well known. The album Hey Demi includes the following song titles:

1. Hey demi demi
2. Yalala
3. Delali Delali
4. Hami Hami
5. Lali Lali
6. Ya Lala

The album Ana Wach Edani includes the titles:

1. Houzni Ala Bladi
2. Ya laoulia
3. Akal Akal
4. Wach li biya
5. Adjbouni Aynik
6. Ayounek
7. Tekabri ya lahmama
8. Rouhi ou arouahi
9. Ya lahwa
10. Ana wach dani
11. Haram Alik
12. Ghabet Lamouima

== Death ==
He died August 12, 2009, between Ain Touta and Batna in a traffic accident.
