= Boubacar Haïnikoye =

Nigerien footballer

Personal information
- Full name: Boubacar Haïnikoye Soumana
- Date of birth: 10 July 1998 (age 28)
- Place of birth: Niamey, Niger
- Height: 1.78 m (5 ft 10 in)
- Position: Midfielder

Team information
- Current team: TP Mazembe

Senior career*
Years	Team	Apps	(Gls)
2016–2018	US GN		
2018–2019	Aduana Stars	4	(0)
2019–2020	CR Belouizdad	6	(2)
2020–2021	NC Magra	23	(3)
2021	CR Belouizdad	0	(0)
2022–2023	US GN		
2023–	TP Mazembe		

International career^{‡}
2017–	Niger	32	(3)
- * Club domestic league appearances and goals as of 4 June 2025 ‡ National team caps and goals as of 4 June 2025

Boubacar Haïnikoye Soumana (born 7 October 1998) is a Nigerien footballer who plays for TP Mazembe and the Niger national team.

== Club career ==
He spent time in Norway on trials with Kristiansund BK and Hamkam in 2018. In May 2018 Haïnikoye joined Ghanaian Champions Aduana Stars F.C. on a 2-year deal from US Gendamerie National. The following January the player moved to Algerian side CR Belouizdad, again on a two-year deal, in hopes of getting more playing time. The following year the player joined NC Magra of the Algerian Ligue Professionnelle 1. Haïnikoye was reportedly the target of racial abuse from the opposing team's officials during a league match against JS Saoura on 29 May 2021.

== International career ==
Haïnikoye made his senior international debut on 13 August 2017 in a 2018 African Nations Championship qualification match against the Ivory Coast. He went on to score his first goal for the team in that game, a late winner in the 2–1 victory.

=== International goals ===
Scores and results list Niger's goal tally first.

No	Date	Venue	Opponent	Score	Result	Competition
1.	13 August 2017	Stade Général Seyni Kountché, Niamey, Niger	Ivory Coast	2–1	2–1	2018 African Nations Championship qualification
Last updated 15 July 2021

=== International career statistics ===
As of match played 17 November 2020.

Niger national team
Year	Apps	Goals
2017	3	1
2018	3	0
2019	0	0
2020	4	0
Total	10	1
