= Ras El Oued, Algeria =

Ras El Oued رأس الوادي Tocqueville
- Commune and town
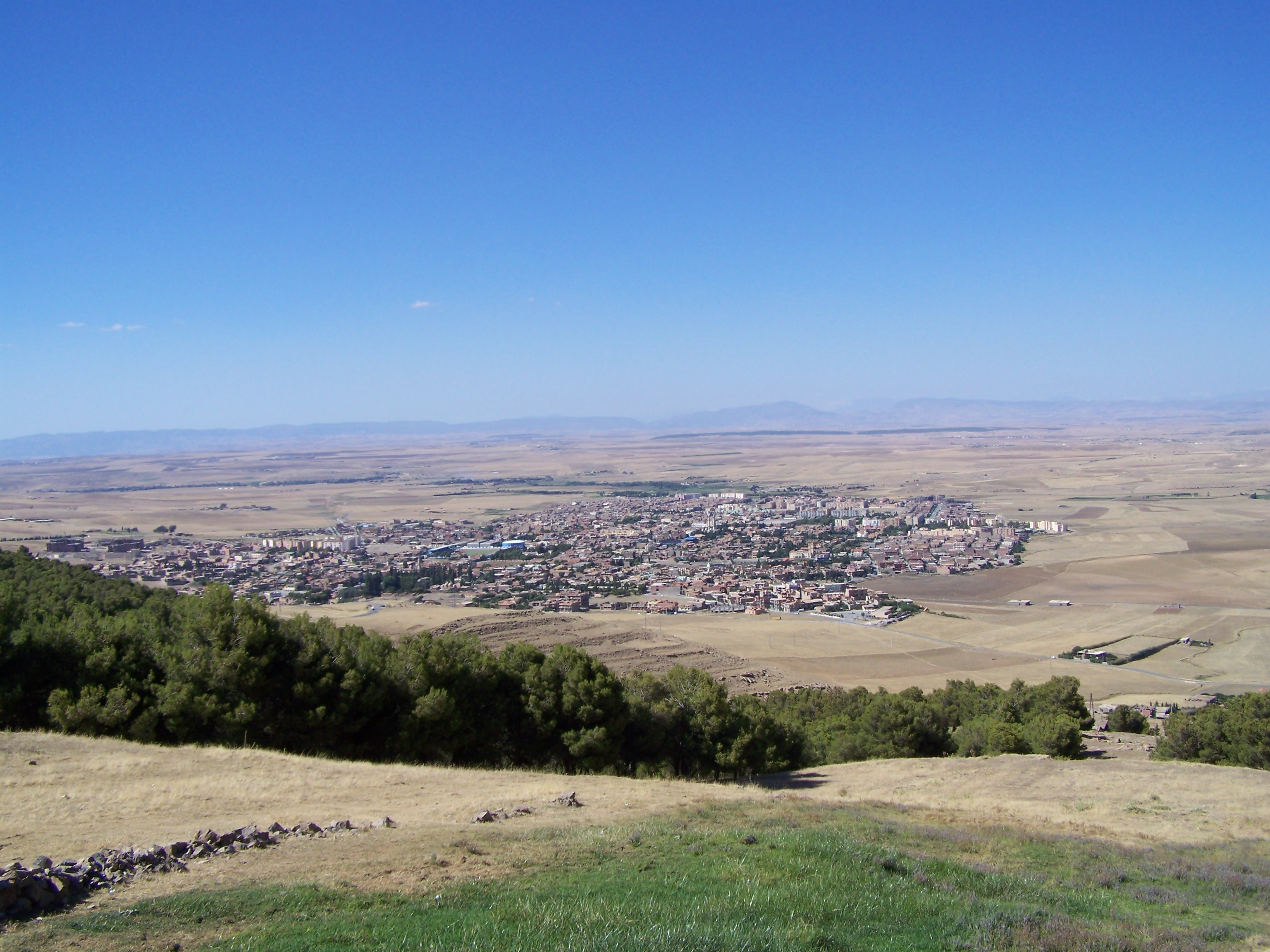

- Location within Algeria
- Coordinates: 35°56′59″N 5°2′9″E
- Country: Algeria
- Province: Bordj Bou Arréridj Province

Population (2008)
  - Total: 51,482
- Time zone: UTC+1 (CET)

Ras El Oued is a town and commune in Bordj Bou Arréridj Province, Algeria. According to the 2008 census, it has a population of 44,947.
