= Walid Belhamri =

Algerian professional footballer (born 1990)

Personal information
- Full name: Walid Belhamri
- Date of birth: 19 November 1990 (age 35)
- Place of birth: Bouinan, Algeria
- Position: Midfielder

Team information
- Current team: IB Khémis El Khechna

Senior career*
Years	Team	Apps	(Gls)
2010–2012	Olympique de Médéa		
2012–2013	USM Blida	18	(1)
2013–2014	Olympique de Médéa	27	(2)
2014–2016	AS Khroub	57	(17)
2016–2018	MC El Eulma	53	(8)
2018–2020	WA Tlemcen	50	(14)
2020–2021	JS Saoura	6	(0)
2021–2022	NC Magra	22	(4)
2022–	IB Khémis El Khechna		
- * Club domestic league appearances and goals

Walid Belhamri (born 19 November 1990) is an Algerian professional footballer who plays for IB Khémis El Khechna.
