= Ali Amiri (Algerian footballer) =

Algerian footballer (born 1987)

Personal information
- Date of birth: 23 October 1987 (age 39)
- Position: Midfielder

Team information
- Current team: ESM Koléa
- Number: 17

Senior career*
Years	Team	Apps	(Gls)
2013–2014	RC Arbaâ	29	(7)
2014–2015	CR Belouizdad	24	(1)
2015–2016	USM Blida	26	(3)
2016–2017	USM Bel-Abbès	8	(0)
2017	US Biskra	6	(0)
2018	RC Relizane	6	(0)
2018–2019	NC Magra	28	(0)
2019–2020	RC Arbaâ	21	(7)
2020–2021	WA Tlemcen	31	(4)
2021–2022	NC Magra	10	(1)
2022–2024	MCB Oued Sly	0	(0)
2024–	ESM Koléa	0	(0)
- * Club domestic league appearances and goals as of 27 October 2023

Ali Amiri (en Arabic: علي أميري) born 23 October 1987) is an Algerian footballer who plays as a midfielder for ESM Koléa.
