= Aïn Touta =

Aïn Touta عين التوتة ⵉⵏ ⵜⵓⵜⴰ
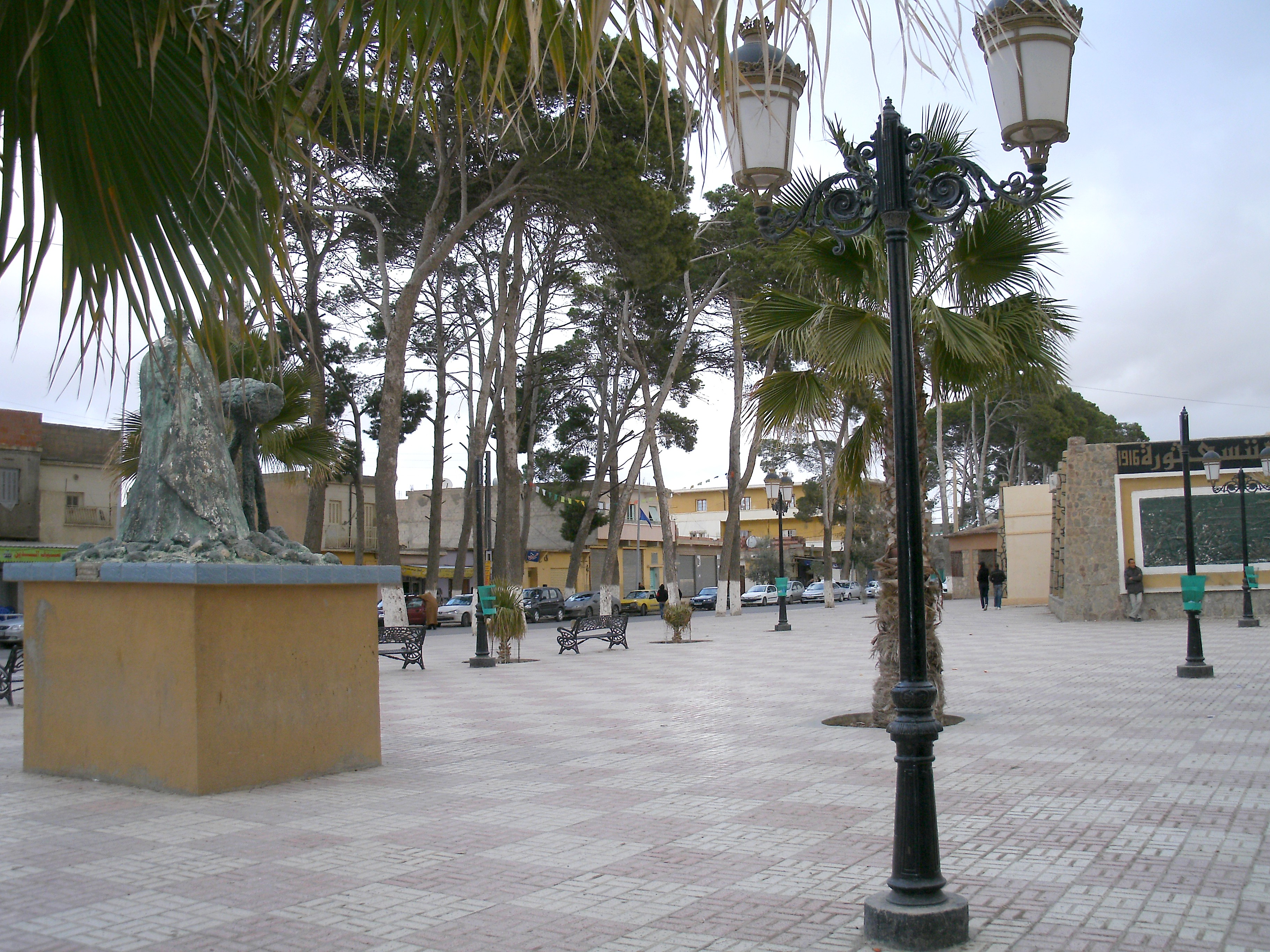

- Location within Algeria
- Coordinates: 35°23′N 5°54′E
- Country: Algeria
- Province: Batna
- District: Aïn Touta

Government

Area
  - Total: 173.5 km^{2} (67.0 sq mi)

Population (2008)
  - Total: 59,904
  - Density: 345.3/km^{2} (894.2/sq mi)
- Time zone: UTC+1 (West Africa Time)

Aïn Touta is a town in eastern Algeria. It is located 35 km southwest of Batna and 82 km north of Biskra. It has an area of about five square kilometers (2 square miles).

Aïn Touta is one of the interesting cities in Algeria because of its strategic location; it passes upon the national road number 3 making this city more active than other cities.

There are four lycées, seven middle schools, a hospital, a car market, a multi-sports hall, two stadiums, and more base structures. There exists also a train gare which is considered the biggest gare during the colonial period - France.

Concerning population, the throne of Ouled Sidi Yahia occupies the first place not only in this city but also in Batna the capital, and Tazoult - Lambèse.

== Localities of the commune ==
The commune of Aïn Touta is composed of 5 localities:

- Aïn Touta
- Briket est le noyau d'ain touta (khodrane "lakhdhar halfaouia" )
- Tamarins (khodrane "lakhdhar halfaouia")
- El Ksour
- Béni Makhlouf (Tamezouin)
