= NC Magra =

Algerian football club

- Full name: Nedjm Chabab Magra
- Nicknames: NC Magra, NCM
- Short name: NCM
- Founded: 1 January 1998; 28 years ago as Nedjm Chabab Magra
- Ground: Boucheligue Brothers Stadium
- Capacity: 8,000
- President: Azzedine Bennacer
- League: Ligue 2
- 2025–26: Ligue 2, Group Centre-east, 7th of 16
Home colours	Away colours	Third colours

Nedjm Chabab Magra (Arabic: نجم شباب مقرة), known as NC Magra or NCM for short, is an Algerian football club based in the city of Magra in M'Sila Province. The club was founded in 1998 and its colours are Blue and white. Their home stadium, Boucheligue Brothers Stadium, has a capacity of 5,000 spectators. The club is currently playing in the Algerian Ligue Professionnelle 1

== History ==
In 2004, NC Magra reached the semi-finals of the 2003–04 Algerian Cup. However, in the semi-finals, they lost 3–0 to JS Kabylie.

On 5 May 2018, NC Magra were promoted to the Algerian Ligue Professionnelle 2 after winning 2017–18 Ligue Nationale du Football Amateur "Group Centre".

In 2020–21 season NC Magra signed a number of young players, and the goal was to ensure that they remained in the Ligue 1, and with the establishment of the League Cup competition, the club had ambitions and despite its involvement with large clubs, it was able to overcome it in the form of CS Constantine, CR Belouizdad and USM Alger. To reach the final of the first tournament in its history where he faced JS Kabylie and was defeated by penalty kicks.

On August 14, 2024, Azzedine Bennacer was re-elected as president of NC Magra for a new term. In a statement to the media, Bennacer once again called for the arrival of a national company, like other professional clubs, to take over the destiny of SSPA NC Magra. Bennacer added "We have been informed that the club is going to be bought by the Groupe Cosider. We are still waiting for the arrival of the company in question. I can assure that within forty-eight hours the transfer of ownership will be completed. We are up to date with our balance sheets and accounting." Regarding the stadium works and the disputes at the CRL level, the president expects help from local authorities.

== Personnel ==
=== Current technical staff ===
Position	Staff
Head coach	
Assistant coach	
Goalkeeping coach	
Fitness coach	

== Statistics ==
=== Recent seasons ===
Season	League									Cup	Other	Africa	Top goalscorer(s) (Note: Goals in all competitions (Algerian Ligue Professionnelle 1, Algerian Cup, League Cup, African and Super Cup) are counted.)		Ref.
Season	Division	Pos	Pts	P	W	D	L	GF	GA	Cup	Other	Africa	Name	Goals	
2015–16	DNA	4th	46	30	12	10	8	34	27	PRR					
2016–17	DNA	4th	51	30	14	9	7	42	30	R64					
2017–18	DNA	1st	63	30	18	9	3	59	31	R32					
2018–19	Ligue 2	2nd	53	30	16	9	5	37	25	R16			Ayache Ziouache	8	
2019–20	Ligue 1 (Note: On March 15, 2020, the Ligue de Football Professionnel (LFP) decided to halt the season due to the COVID-19 pandemic in Algeria. On July 29, 2020, the LFP declared that season is over and CR Belouizdad to be the champion, the promotion of four teams from the League 2, and scrapping the relegation for the current season.)	16th	19	22	4	7	11	16	30	R64			Akram Demane	3	
2020–21	Ligue 1	9th	52	38	14	10	14	38	44	NP	RU		Akram Demane	9	
2021–22	Ligue 1	13th	45	34	13	6	15	31	36	NP			Akram Demane; Ramdane Hitala	5	
2022–23	Ligue 1	13th	40	30	11	7	12	35	36	SF			Faik Amrane	6	
2023–24	Ligue 1	12th	38	30	9	11	10	30	32	R64			Hamza Demane	10	
2024–25	Ligue 1									R64					
