= Boucheligue Brothers Stadium =

Football stadium in Magra, Algeria

- Interactive map of Boucheligue Brothers Stadium
- Full name: Boucheligue Brothers Stadium
- Location: Magra, M'Sila, Algeria
- Coordinates: 35.62°N 5.1°E
- Owner: APC of Magra
- Capacity: 8,000
- Surface: Artificial turf

Tenant
- NC Magra

Boucheligue Brothers Stadium (Arabic: ملعب الإخوة بوشليق) is a football stadium in Magra, Algeria. The stadium holds 8,000 people. It serves as a home ground for NC Magra.
