= Magra, Algeria =

Coordinates: 35°36′N 5°04′E

Magra
- Commune and town
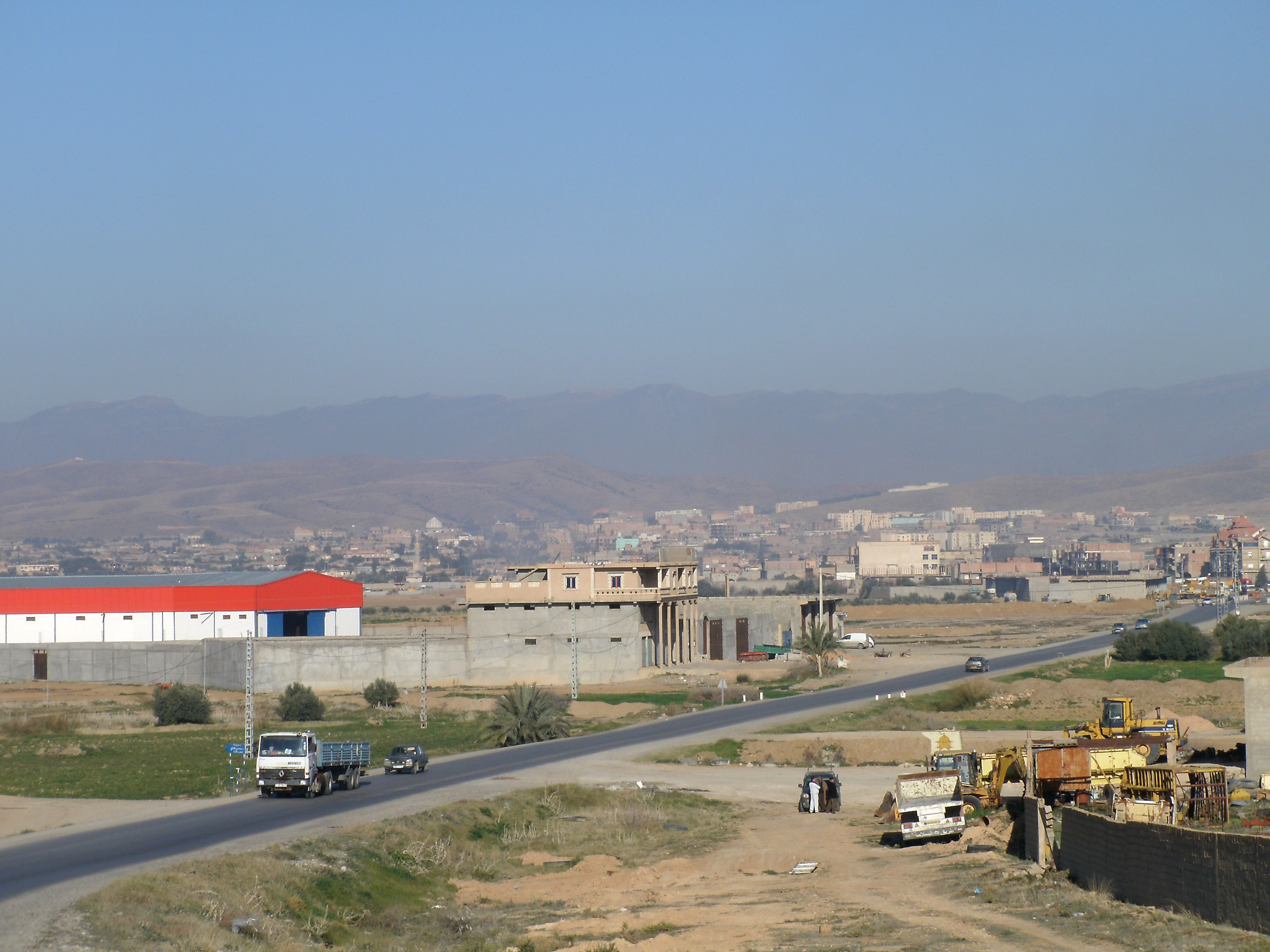

- Country: Algeria
- Province: M'Sila Province

Area
  - Land: 25.573 sq mi (66.234 km^{2})

Population (2008)
  - Total: 39,250
- Time zone: UTC+1 (CET)
- Code Postal: 28150

Magra or Maggara (Maqra or Maqqara, Macri in antiquity) is a town and commune in M'Sila Province, Algeria. According to the 1998 census it has a population of 31,749.

== Municipal establishment and location ==
City: Magra Country: Algeria Latitude: 35.69208 Longitude: 5.1074 Time Zone: UTC+1, Africa/Algiers

Municipality Magra established in: 01.01.1957 after separated from the mixed state of the Aures former municipality, and in 1974 became an administrative and a regional to the state of M'sila, is located in the north-east of the state, mediated by the territorial boundaries of the states. "Batna, Setif," and the meeting of national roads, "28 and 40". Run by popular elected municipal council consists of 11 members with different municipal administration political composition of 28 permanent employees, and operates 143 workers, including 38 temporary distributors on various municipal facilities.

== History ==
Magra Is the village of "Zab" located between the city of Barika and M'sila. It was first mentioned by Muslim historian Ya'qubi in his book "Kitab al-Buldan", who died in 284 AH (827 AD), where he said, "and the city said to be Magra, have many forts, its people are, some of the Bani Debba and some of Ajam known asTrirh, around them some of the Berbers called the children of Negroes.". Also, Yaqut Al Hamawi said about it "Magra is a city in Maghrib, close to the Beni Hammad Fort between Tabna eight forsakes, by armed Sultan road officer, attributed to" Abdul Rahman bin Mohammed Mokri. "And Idrissi said" Magra is great city, where the Tribune and Walls its people of Bani Debba by some of the Ajam and around some of the Berbers, the farms and many forts, people are planting flax, and in the near age was famous for rich gardens, and its farmland fertile, was famous for the production of olive oil, until it became the proverbial that "a shaggy head ... oh so come to you oil from Magra". It also has several sites known as "Hancher Ramada", dating back to the Roman era, where rich natural areas, to become after the Islamic ruling to a big city.

== Topography and location ==
Municipality is located in the north-eastern side of the Shatt al-Hodna basin, surrounded by Magra network and Bouchaara that belong to the mountain range known as the "Hodna Heights" with an altitude of 800 to 1000 m. Affected by a Mediterranean climate semi-continental climate, hot dry summers, cool rainy winter, a height above sea level of about 600 m. Monthly rainfall up to a maximum ratio between the months of November and March In up to 50% of the total rainfall. Temperature according to studies presented by the International Organization for feeding that took place on the shore of Hodna area, the monthly rate up to 18.6 degrees and the average annual rainfall 415 mm.
