= 2021–22 in Algerian football =

Algerian sporting competition

Football in Algeria
- Season: 2021–22

Men's football
- Ligue Pro. 1: CR Belouizdad
- Ligue 2: Centre East USM Khenchela; Centre West MC El Bayadh
- Inter-Régions: West ES Mostaganem; Centre West E Sour El Ghozlane; Centre East IB Khémis El Khechna; East AS Khroub; South West SC Mécheria; South East US Souf
- Algerian Cup: Cancelled

Women's football
- Women's Championship: Afak Relizane
- Women's Cup: Cancelled

The 2021–22 season will be the 59th season of competitive association football in Algeria.

== National teams ==
=== Algeria men's national football team ===
==== Results and fixtures ====
===== Friendlies =====
| 5 January 2022 Friendly | Algeria | 3–0 | Ghana | Al Rayyan, Qatar |
| 19:00 UTC+3 | Ounas 8'; J. Mensah 74' (o.g.); Slimani 79' | Report | | Stadium: Education City Stadium; Referee: Saoud Ali Al-Adba (Qatar) |

| 12 June 2022 Friendly | Iran | 1–2 | Algeria | Doha, Qatar |
| 19:00 UTC+3 | Jahanbakhsh 64' | Report | Benayad 44'; Amoura 83' | Stadium: Suheim bin Hamad Stadium; Referee: Mohammed Ahmed Al-Shammari (Qatar) |

==== 2022 FIFA World Cup qualification ====
===== Second round =====
| Pos | Team | Pld | W | D | L | GF | GA | GD | Pts | Qualification |
|---|---|---|---|---|---|---|---|---|---|---|
| 1 | Algeria | 6 | 4 | 2 | 0 | 25 | 4 | +21 | 14 | Advance to third round |
| 2 | Burkina Faso | 6 | 3 | 3 | 0 | 12 | 4 | +8 | 12 | |
| 3 | Niger | 6 | 2 | 1 | 3 | 13 | 17 | −4 | 7 | |
| 4 | Djibouti | 6 | 0 | 0 | 6 | 4 | 29 | −25 | 0 | |

Source: FIFA, Soccerway
Rules for classification: Tiebreakers

| 2 September 2021 1 | Algeria | 8–0 | Djibouti | Blida, Algeria |
| 20:00 UTC+1 | Slimani 5', 25' (pen.), 46', 53'; Bensebaini 27'; Bounedjah 40' (pen.); Mahrez 67'; Zerrouki 69' | Report | | Stadium: Mustapha Tchaker Stadium; Attendance: 0 Referee: Blaise Yuven Ngwa (Cameroon) |

| 7 September 2021 2 | Burkina Faso | 1–1 | Algeria | Marrakesh, Morocco |
| 20:00 UTC+1 | Tapsoba 64' | Report | Feghouli 18' | Stadium: Stade de Marrakech; Attendance: 0 Referee: Joshua Bondo (Botswana) |

| 8 October 2021 3 | Algeria | 6–1 | Niger | Blida, Algeria |
| 20:00 UTC+1 | Mahrez 27', 60' (pen.); Oumarou 47' (o.g.); Souleymane 70' (o.g.); Slimani 76', 88' | Report | Sosah 50' | Stadium: Mustapha Tchaker Stadium; Attendance: 0 Referee: Daniel Nii Ayi Laryea (Ghana) |

| 12 October 2021 4 | Niger | 0–4 | Algeria | Niamey, Niger |
| 17:00 UTC+1 | | Report | Mahrez 21'; Mandi 33'; Bennacer 48'; Bounedjah 54' | Stadium: Stade Général Seyni Kountché; Attendance: 2,000; Referee: Issa Sy (Senegal) |

| 12 November 2021 5 | Djibouti | 0–4 | Algeria | Cairo, Egypt |
| 16:00 UTC+2 | | Report | Belaïli 29'; Benrahma 40'; Feghouli 42'; Slimani 87' | Stadium: Cairo International Stadium; Attendance: 0 Referee: Djindo Louis Houngnandande (Benin) |

| 16 November 2021 6 | Algeria | 2–2 | Burkina Faso | Blida, Algeria |
| 20:00 UTC+1 | Mahrez 21'; Feghouli 68' | Report | Sanogo 37'; Dayo 84' (pen.) | Stadium: Mustapha Tchaker Stadium; Attendance: 17,000; Referee: Victor Gomes (South Africa) |

===== Third round =====
| 25 March 2022 First leg | Cameroon | 0–1 | Algeria | Douala, Cameroon |
| 18:00 UTC+1 | | Report | Slimani 40' | Stadium: Japoma Stadium; Referee: Joshua Bondo (Botswana) |

| 29 March 2022 Second leg | Algeria | 1–2 (a.e.t.) (2–2 (a) agg.) | Cameroon | Blida, Algeria |
| 20:30 UTC+1 | Touba 118' | Report | Choupo-Moting 22'; Toko Ekambi 120+4' | Stadium: Mustapha Tchaker Stadium; Referee: Bakary Gassama (Gambia) |

==== 2021 FIFA Arab Cup ====
| Pos | Team | Pld | W | D | L | GF | GA | GD | Pts | Qualification |
|---|---|---|---|---|---|---|---|---|---|---|
| 1 | Egypt | 3 | 2 | 1 | 0 | 7 | 1 | +6 | 7 (Note: Fair-play points: Egypt –6, Algeria –11.) | Advance to knockout stage |
| 2 | Algeria | 3 | 2 | 1 | 0 | 7 | 1 | +6 | 7 | Advance to knockout stage |
| 3 | Lebanon | 3 | 1 | 0 | 2 | 1 | 3 | −2 | 3 | |
| 4 | Sudan | 3 | 0 | 0 | 3 | 0 | 10 | −10 | 0 | |

Source: FIFA
Notes:

| 1 December 2021 1 | Algeria | 4–0 | Sudan | Al Rayyan, Qatar |
| 13:00 UTC+3 | Bounedjah 11', 37'; Benlamri 43'; Soudani 46' | Report | | Stadium: Ahmed bin Ali Stadium; Attendance: 2,203; Referee: Ryuji Sato (Japan) |

| 4 December 2021 2 | Lebanon | 0–2 | Algeria | Al Wakrah, Qatar |
| 16:00 UTC+3 | | Report | Brahimi 69' (pen.); Meziani 90+3' | Stadium: Al Janoub Stadium; Attendance: 9,405; Referee: Szymon Marciniak (Poland) |

| 7 December 2021 3 | Algeria | 1–1 | Egypt | Al Wakrah, Qatar |
| 22:00 UTC+3 | Tougai 19' | Report | El Solia 60' (pen.) | Stadium: Al Janoub Stadium; Attendance: 32,418; Referee: Facundo Tello (Argentina) |

===== knockout stage =====
====== Quarter-finals ======
| 11 December 2021 | Morocco | 2–2 (a.e.t.) (3–5 p) | Algeria | Doha, Qatar |
| 22:00 UTC+3 | Nahiri 64'; Benoun 111' | Report | Brahimi 62' (pen.); Belaïli 102' | Stadium: Al Thumama Stadium; Attendance: 24,823; Referee: Wilton Sampaio (Brazil) |
| | Penalties |
| | Rahimi (penalty scored); Benoun (penalty scored); Jabrane (penalty scored); El Berkaoui (penalty missed) | | (penalty scored) Belaïli; (penalty scored) Bendebka; (penalty scored) Bedrane; (penalty scored) Benayada; (penalty scored) Tougai |

====== Semi-finals ======
| 15 December 2021 | Qatar | 1–2 | Algeria | Doha, Qatar |
| 22:00 UTC+3 | Muntari 90+7' | Report | Benayada 59'; Belaïli 90+17' | Stadium: Al Thumama Stadium; Attendance: 42,405; Referee: Szymon Marciniak (Poland) |

====== Final ======
18 December 2021
18:00

| Tunisia | 0–2 (a.e.t.) | Algeria |
|---|---|---|
| | Report | Sayoud 99'; Brahimi 120+5' |

Al Bayt Stadium, Al Khor
Attendance: 60,456
Referee: Daniel Siebert (Germany)

==== 2021 Africa Cup of Nations ====
| Pos | Team | Pld | W | D | L | GF | GA | GD | Pts | Qualification |
|---|---|---|---|---|---|---|---|---|---|---|
| 1 | Ivory Coast | 3 | 2 | 1 | 0 | 6 | 3 | +3 | 7 | Advance to knockout stage |
| 2 | Equatorial Guinea | 3 | 2 | 0 | 1 | 2 | 1 | +1 | 6 | Advance to knockout stage |
| 3 | Sierra Leone | 3 | 0 | 2 | 1 | 2 | 3 | −1 | 2 | |
| 4 | Algeria | 3 | 0 | 1 | 2 | 1 | 4 | −3 | 1 | |

Source: CAF

| 11 January 2022 1 | Algeria | 0–0 | Sierra Leone | Douala, Cameroon |
| 14:00 UTC+1 | | Report | | Stadium: Japoma Stadium; Referee: Ahmad Imetehaz Heeralall (Mauritius) |

| 16 January 2022 2 | Algeria | 0–1 | Equatorial Guinea | Douala, Cameroon |
| 20:00 UTC+1 | | Report | Esteban 70' | Stadium: Japoma Stadium; Referee: Mario Escobar (Guatemala) |

| 20 January 2022 3 | Ivory Coast | 3–1 | Algeria | Douala, Cameroon |
| 17:00 UTC+1 | Kessié 22'; I. Sangaré 39'; Pépé 54' | Report | Bendebka 73' | Stadium: Japoma Stadium; Referee: Victor Gomes (South Africa) |

==== 2023 Africa Cup of Nations qualification ====
===== Group stage =====
| Pos | Team | Pld | W | D | L | GF | GA | GD | Pts | Qualification |
|---|---|---|---|---|---|---|---|---|---|---|
| 1 | Algeria | 6 | 5 | 1 | 0 | 9 | 2 | +7 | 16 | Final tournament |
| 2 | Tanzania | 6 | 2 | 2 | 2 | 3 | 4 | −1 | 8 | Final tournament |
| 3 | Uganda | 6 | 2 | 1 | 3 | 5 | 6 | −1 | 7 | |
| 4 | Niger | 6 | 0 | 2 | 4 | 3 | 8 | −5 | 2 | |

Source: CAF

| 4 June 2022 1 | Algeria | 2–0 | Uganda | Algiers, Algeria |
| 20:00 UTC+1 | Mandi 28'; Belaïli 80' | Report | | Stadium: Stade du 5 Juillet; Referee: Mohamed Hussein (Egypt) |

| 8 June 2022 2 | Tanzania | 0–2 | Algeria | Dar es Salaam, Tanzania |
| 19:00 UTC+3 | | Report | Bensebaini 45+2'; Amoura 89' | Stadium: National Stadium; Referee: Mahmood Ismail (Sudan) |

=== Algeria women's national football team ===
==== 2022 Women's Africa Cup of Nations qualification ====
===== First round =====
| 20 October 2021 First leg | Algeria | 14–0 | Sudan | Algiers |
| 18:00 UTC+1 | Oum Srir 2' (o.g.); Bouhenni 6', 15', 37', 46'; Koui 11', 67'; Bouzid 17', 18'; Ould Braham 29', 30'; Belkacemi 48'; Bara 71'; Merrouche 82' | | | Stadium: Omar Hamadi Stadium; Referee: Asma Chouchane (Tunisia) |

| 26 October 2021 Second leg | Sudan | Cancelled | Algeria | Omdurman |
| | | | | Stadium: Al Hilal Stadium; Referee: Suzana Semere (Eritrea) |
Note: The second leg match between Sudan and Algeria initially scheduled for 26 October was postponed and later cancelled due to security concerns following the October 2021 Sudanese coup d'état.

===== Second round =====
| 18 February 2022 First leg | South Africa | 2–0 | Algeria | Johannesburg |
| 15:00 UTC+2 | Magaia 40'; Kgatlana 89' | | | Stadium: Orlando Stadium; Referee: Mercy Kayira (Malawi) |

| 23 February 2022 Second leg | Algeria | 1–1 | South Africa | Algiers |
| 18:00 UTC+1 | Koui 45+2' | | Motlhalo 63' (pen.) | Stadium: Stade Omar Hamadi; Referee: Dorsaf Ganouati (Tunisia) |

== CAF competitions ==
=== CAF Champions League ===
==== Qualifying rounds ====
===== First round =====
| Team 1 | Agg. | Team 2 | 1st leg | 2nd leg |
|---|---|---|---|---|
| Akwa United (Nigeria) | 1–2 | (Algeria) CR Belouizdad | 1–0 | 0–2 |
| Fortune FC (The Gambia) | 3–3 (4–5 p) | (Algeria) ES Sétif | 3–0 | 0–3 |

===== Second round =====
| Team 1 | Agg. | Team 2 | 1st leg | 2nd leg |
|---|---|---|---|---|
| ASEC Mimosas (Ivory Coast) | 3–3 (a) | (Algeria) CR Belouizdad | 3–1 | 0–2 |
| FC Nouadhibou (Mauritania) | 3–3 (a) | (Algeria) ES Sétif | 3–1 | 0–2 |

==== Group stage ====
===== Group B =====
| Pos | Team | Pld | W | D | L | GF | GA | GD | Pts | Qualification | RCA | ESS | AMZ | HOR |
|---|---|---|---|---|---|---|---|---|---|---|---|---|---|---|
| 1 | (Morocco) Raja CA | 6 | 5 | 0 | 1 | 7 | 2 | +5 | 15 | Advance to knockout stage | — | 1–0 | 1–0 | 1–0 |
| 2 | (Algeria) ES Sétif | 6 | 3 | 0 | 3 | 6 | 5 | +1 | 9 | Advance to knockout stage | 0–1 | — | 2–0 | 3–2 |
| 3 | (South Africa) AmaZulu | 6 | 2 | 1 | 3 | 3 | 6 | −3 | 7 | | 0–2 | 1–0 | — | 1–0 |
| 4 | (Guinea) Horoya | 6 | 1 | 1 | 4 | 5 | 8 | −3 | 4 | | 2–1 | 0–1 | 1–1 | — |

Source: CAF

===== Group C =====
| Pos | Team | Pld | W | D | L | GF | GA | GD | Pts | Qualification | EST | CRB | ESS | GAL |
|---|---|---|---|---|---|---|---|---|---|---|---|---|---|---|
| 1 | (Tunisia) Espérance de Tunis | 6 | 4 | 2 | 0 | 12 | 2 | +10 | 14 | Advance to knockout stage | — | 2–1 | 0–0 | 4–0 |
| 2 | (Algeria) CR Belouizdad | 6 | 3 | 2 | 1 | 10 | 5 | +5 | 11 | Advance to knockout stage | 1–1 | — | 2–0 | 4–1 |
| 3 | (Tunisia) Étoile du Sahel | 6 | 1 | 3 | 2 | 4 | 7 | −3 | 6 | | 0–2 | 0–0 | — | 3–2 |
| 4 | (Botswana) Jwaneng Galaxy | 6 | 0 | 1 | 5 | 5 | 17 | −12 | 1 | | 0–3 | 1–2 | 1–1 | — |

Source: CAF

==== Knockout phase ====
===== Quarter-finals =====
| Team 1 | Agg. | Team 2 | 1st leg | 2nd leg |
|---|---|---|---|---|
| ES Sétif (Algeria) | 1–0 | (Tunisia) Espérance de Tunis | 0–0 | 1–0 |
| CR Belouizdad (Algeria) | 0–1 | (Morocco) Wydad AC | 0–1 | 0–0 |

===== Semi-finals =====
| Team 1 | Agg. | Team 2 | 1st leg | 2nd leg |
|---|---|---|---|---|
| Al Ahly (Egypt) | 6–2 | (Algeria) ES Sétif | 4–0 | 2–2 |

=== CAF Confederation Cup ===
==== Qualifying rounds ====
===== Second round =====
| Team 1 | Agg. | Team 2 | 1st leg | 2nd leg |
|---|---|---|---|---|
| AS FAR (Morocco) | 1–3 | (Algeria) JS Kabylie | 0–1 | 1–2 |
| ASAC Concorde (Mauritania) | 2–3 | (Algeria) JS Saoura | 1–2 | 1–1 |

===== Play-off round =====
| Team 1 | Agg. | Team 2 | 1st leg | 2nd leg |
|---|---|---|---|---|
| Hearts of Oak (Ghana) | 2–4 | (Algeria) JS Saoura | 2–0 | 0–4 |
| Royal Leopards (Eswatini) | 2–2 (a) | (Algeria) JS Kabylie | 1–0 | 1–2 |

==== Group stage ====
===== Group B =====
| Pos | Team | Pld | W | D | L | GF | GA | GD | Pts | Qualification | ORL | ITT | JSS | ROL |
|---|---|---|---|---|---|---|---|---|---|---|---|---|---|---|
| 1 | (South Africa) Orlando Pirates | 6 | 4 | 1 | 1 | 15 | 5 | +10 | 13 | Advance to knockout stage | — | 0–0 | 2–0 | 3–0 |
| 2 | (Libya) Al Ittihad | 6 | 3 | 2 | 1 | 9 | 7 | +2 | 11 | Advance to knockout stage | 3–2 | — | 1–1 | 3–2 |
| 3 | (Algeria) JS Saoura | 6 | 3 | 1 | 2 | 6 | 5 | +1 | 10 | | 0–2 | 1–0 | — | 2–0 |
| 4 | (Eswatini) Royal Leopards | 6 | 0 | 0 | 6 | 5 | 18 | −13 | 0 | | 2–6 | 1–2 | 0–2 | — |

Source: CAF

== Promotion and relegation ==
=== Pre-season ===
| League | Promoted to league | Relegated from league |
|---|---|---|
| Ligue 1 | | |
| Ligue 2 | | |
| Inter Régions | | |

== League season ==
=== Ligue Professionnelle 1 ===
| Pos | Team | Pld | W | D | L | GF | GA | GD | Pts | Qualification or relegation |
|---|---|---|---|---|---|---|---|---|---|---|
| 1 | CR Belouizdad (C) | 34 | 21 | 7 | 6 | 54 | 22 | +32 | 70 | Qualification for CAF Champions League |
| 2 | JS Kabylie | 34 | 16 | 13 | 5 | 40 | 20 | +20 | 61 | Qualification for CAF Champions League |
| 3 | JS Saoura | 34 | 17 | 9 | 8 | 59 | 23 | +36 | 60 | Qualification for CAF Confederation Cup |
| 4 | USM Alger | 34 | 15 | 12 | 7 | 45 | 22 | +23 | 57 | Qualification for CAF Confederation Cup |
| 5 | CS Constantine | 34 | 15 | 10 | 9 | 46 | 29 | +17 | 55 | |
| 6 | Paradou AC | 34 | 16 | 6 | 12 | 43 | 36 | +7 | 54 (Note: Paradou AC finished ahead of ES Sétif on head-to-head points: Paradou AC 1–0 ES Sétif, ES Sétif 0–1 Paradou AC.) | |
| 7 | ES Sétif | 34 | 15 | 9 | 10 | 43 | 24 | +19 | 54 | |
| 8 | MC Alger | 34 | 13 | 12 | 9 | 36 | 24 | +12 | 51 | |
| 9 | ASO Chlef | 34 | 13 | 11 | 10 | 38 | 31 | +7 | 50 (Note: ASO Chlef finished ahead of US Biskra on head-to-head goal difference: US Biskra 2–1 ASO Chlef, ASO Chlef 2–0 US Biskra.) | |
| 10 | US Biskra | 34 | 13 | 11 | 10 | 36 | 32 | +4 | 50 | |
| 11 | MC Oran | 34 | 10 | 16 | 8 | 32 | 29 | +3 | 46 | |
| 12 | HB Chelghoum Laïd | 34 | 11 | 12 | 11 | 40 | 41 | −1 | 45 | |
| 13 | NC Magra | 34 | 13 | 6 | 15 | 31 | 36 | −5 | 45 | |
| 14 | RC Arbaâ | 34 | 10 | 13 | 11 | 40 | 45 | −5 | 43 | |
| 15 | Olympique de Médéa (R) | 34 | 10 | 6 | 18 | 32 | 53 | −21 | 36 | Relegation to Algerian Ligue 2 |
| 16 | NA Hussein Dey (R) | 34 | 5 | 7 | 22 | 33 | 66 | −33 | 22 | Relegation to Algerian Ligue 2 |
| 17 | RC Relizane (R) | 34 | 4 | 8 | 22 | 31 | 87 | −56 | 20 | Relegation to Algerian Ligue 2 |
| 18 | WA Tlemcen (R) | 34 | 3 | 4 | 27 | 13 | 72 | −59 | 13 | Relegation to Algerian Ligue 2 |

Updated to match(es) played on 17 June 2022. Source: the-sports.org
Rules for classification: 1) points; 2) head-to-head points; 3) head-to-head goal difference; 4) goal difference; 5) total goals; 6) fairplay ranking; 7) playoff.
(C) Champions; (R) Relegated

=== Ligue 2 ===
Group Centre East
| Pos | Team | Pld | W | D | L | GF | GA | GD | Pts | Promotion or relegation |
|---|---|---|---|---|---|---|---|---|---|---|
| 1 | USM Khenchela (C, P) | 30 | 19 | 10 | 1 | 60 | 22 | +38 | 67 | Ligue 1 |
| 2 | JS Bordj Ménaïel | 30 | 19 | 7 | 4 | 53 | 20 | +33 | 64 | |
| 3 | NRB Teleghma | 30 | 12 | 13 | 5 | 50 | 34 | +16 | 49 | |
| 4 | CA Batna | 30 | 12 | 10 | 8 | 35 | 33 | +2 | 46 | |
| 5 | IRB Ouargla | 30 | 12 | 5 | 13 | 42 | 38 | +4 | 41 | |
| 6 | JSM Skikda | 30 | 12 | 5 | 13 | 28 | 31 | −3 | 41 | |
| 7 | USM Annaba | 30 | 11 | 9 | 10 | 30 | 34 | −4 | 41 (Note: USM Annaba were deducted 1 point.) | |
| 8 | AS Aïn M'lila | 30 | 11 | 7 | 12 | 29 | 35 | −6 | 40 | |
| 9 | HAMRA Annaba | 30 | 10 | 9 | 11 | 27 | 28 | −1 | 39 | |
| 10 | US Chaouia | 30 | 11 | 6 | 13 | 35 | 37 | −2 | 39 | |
| 11 | MO Constantine | 30 | 9 | 11 | 10 | 30 | 31 | −1 | 38 | |
| 12 | MC El Eulma | 30 | 10 | 8 | 12 | 34 | 36 | −2 | 38 | |
| 13 | MO Béjaïa (R) | 30 | 7 | 17 | 6 | 39 | 31 | +8 | 38 | Relegation to Inter-Régions |
| 14 | JSM Béjaïa (R) | 30 | 9 | 9 | 12 | 36 | 38 | −2 | 36 | Relegation to Inter-Régions |
| 15 | CA Bordj Bou Arréridj (R) | 30 | 6 | 5 | 19 | 35 | 64 | −29 | 23 | Relegation to Inter-Régions |
| 16 | IB Lakhdaria (R) | 30 | 2 | 5 | 23 | 18 | 69 | −51 | 11 | Relegation to Inter-Régions |

Updated to match(es) played on 21 May 2022. Source: lnf-amateur.dz
Rules for classification: 1) points; 2) head-to-head points; 3) head-to-head goal difference; 4) goal difference; 5) total goals; 6) fairplay ranking; 7) playoff.
(C) Champions; (P) Promoted; (R) Relegated
Notes:

Group Centre West
| Pos | Team | Pld | W | D | L | GF | GA | GD | Pts | Promotion or relegation |
|---|---|---|---|---|---|---|---|---|---|---|
| 1 | MC El Bayadh (C, P) | 30 | 21 | 5 | 4 | 47 | 11 | +36 | 68 | Ligue 1 |
| 2 | CR Témouchent | 30 | 20 | 8 | 2 | 34 | 9 | +25 | 68 | |
| 3 | RC Kouba | 30 | 18 | 5 | 7 | 53 | 27 | +26 | 59 | |
| 4 | ES Ben Aknoun | 30 | 14 | 5 | 11 | 52 | 32 | +20 | 47 | |
| 5 | JSM Tiaret | 30 | 14 | 5 | 11 | 47 | 30 | +17 | 47 | |
| 6 | USM El Harrach | 30 | 14 | 5 | 11 | 34 | 22 | +12 | 47 | |
| 7 | MC Saïda | 30 | 11 | 10 | 9 | 35 | 28 | +7 | 43 | |
| 8 | MCB Oued Sly | 30 | 11 | 8 | 11 | 33 | 28 | +5 | 41 | |
| 9 | WA Boufarik | 30 | 11 | 6 | 13 | 37 | 38 | −1 | 39 | |
| 10 | GC Mascara | 30 | 11 | 6 | 13 | 34 | 36 | −2 | 39 | |
| 11 | SKAF Khemis Miliana | 30 | 11 | 5 | 14 | 30 | 32 | −2 | 38 | |
| 12 | ASM Oran | 30 | 10 | 8 | 12 | 28 | 30 | −2 | 38 | |
| 13 | CRB Aïn Oussera (R) | 30 | 9 | 7 | 14 | 26 | 41 | −15 | 34 | Relegation to Inter-Régions |
| 14 | USMM Hadjout (R) | 30 | 10 | 2 | 18 | 25 | 46 | −21 | 32 | Relegation to Inter-Régions |
| 15 | USM Bel Abbès (R) | 30 | 6 | 5 | 19 | 25 | 49 | −24 | 23 | Relegation to Inter-Régions |
| 16 | SC Aïn Defla (R) | 30 | 2 | 4 | 24 | 17 | 98 | −81 | 1 (Note: SC Aïn Defla were deducted 9 points.) | Relegation to Inter-Régions |

Updated to match(es) played on 21 May 2022. Source: lnf-amateur.dz
Rules for classification: 1) points; 2) head-to-head points; 3) head-to-head goal difference; 4) goal difference; 5) total goals; 6) fairplay ranking; 7) playoff.
(C) Champions; (P) Promoted; (R) Relegated

=== Ligue Inter Régions ===
==== Group West ====
| Pos | Team | Pld | W | D | L | GF | GA | GD | Pts | Promotion or relegation |
|---|---|---|---|---|---|---|---|---|---|---|
| 1 | ES Mostaganem (C, P) | 30 | 24 | 5 | 1 | 55 | 11 | +44 | 77 | Ligue 2 |
| 2 | WA Mostaganem | 30 | 22 | 6 | 2 | 69 | 14 | +55 | 72 | |
| 3 | Nasr Es Senia | 30 | 13 | 8 | 9 | 31 | 32 | −1 | 47 | |
| 4 | SCM Oran | 30 | 13 | 6 | 11 | 47 | 36 | +11 | 45 | |
| 5 | FCB Telagh | 30 | 12 | 8 | 10 | 45 | 29 | +16 | 44 | |
| 6 | JS Emir Abdelkader | 30 | 13 | 5 | 12 | 38 | 38 | 0 | 44 | |
| 7 | IRB Maghnia | 30 | 13 | 3 | 14 | 45 | 50 | −5 | 42 | |
| 8 | US Remchi | 30 | 11 | 8 | 11 | 36 | 38 | −2 | 41 | |
| 9 | IRB El Kerma | 30 | 10 | 11 | 9 | 32 | 29 | +3 | 41 | |
| 10 | ICS Tlemcen | 30 | 12 | 5 | 13 | 30 | 30 | 0 | 41 | |
| 11 | IS Tighennif | 30 | 13 | 1 | 16 | 35 | 36 | −1 | 40 | |
| 12 | JS Sig | 30 | 11 | 7 | 12 | 32 | 38 | −6 | 40 | Ranking for Relegation |
| 13 | MB Hassasna (R) | 30 | 12 | 3 | 15 | 30 | 45 | −15 | 39 | Relegation to Ligue Régional I |
| 14 | MB Sidi Chahmi (R) | 30 | 7 | 8 | 15 | 38 | 49 | −11 | 29 | Relegation to Ligue Régional I |
| 15 | OM Arzew (R) | 30 | 5 | 4 | 21 | 30 | 66 | −36 | 19 | Relegation to Ligue Régional I |
| 16 | ASB Maghnia (R) | 30 | 3 | 4 | 23 | 16 | 68 | −52 | 7 (Note: ASB Maghnia were deducted 6 points.) | Relegation to Ligue Régional I |

Updated to match(es) played on 1 June 2024. Source: lnf-amateur.dz
Rules for classification: 1) points; 2) head-to-head points; 3) head-to-head goal difference; 4) goal difference; 5) total goals; 6) fairplay ranking; 7) playoff.
(C) Champions; (P) Promoted; (R) Relegated

==== Group Centre West ====
| Pos | Team | Pld | W | D | L | GF | GA | GD | Pts | Promotion or relegation |
|---|---|---|---|---|---|---|---|---|---|---|
| 1 | E Sour El Ghozlane (C, P) | 30 | 21 | 3 | 6 | 56 | 20 | +36 | 66 | Ligue 2 |
| 2 | JS Tixeraine | 30 | 14 | 6 | 10 | 34 | 33 | +1 | 48 | |
| 3 | CR Zaouia | 30 | 13 | 8 | 9 | 41 | 29 | +12 | 47 | |
| 4 | WAB Tissemsilt | 30 | 13 | 6 | 11 | 39 | 35 | +4 | 45 | |
| 5 | RA Aïn Defla | 30 | 14 | 2 | 14 | 33 | 37 | −4 | 44 | |
| 6 | ORB Oued Fodda | 30 | 13 | 5 | 12 | 31 | 37 | −6 | 44 | |
| 7 | CB Beni Slimane | 30 | 12 | 8 | 10 | 30 | 27 | +3 | 44 | |
| 8 | FCB Frenda | 30 | 14 | 2 | 14 | 46 | 42 | +4 | 44 | |
| 9 | JS Haï Djebel | 30 | 13 | 5 | 12 | 46 | 36 | +10 | 44 | |
| 10 | ESM Koléa | 30 | 12 | 8 | 10 | 38 | 26 | +12 | 44 | |
| 11 | RCB Oued R'hiou | 30 | 13 | 5 | 12 | 52 | 37 | +15 | 44 | |
| 12 | USM Blida | 30 | 12 | 7 | 11 | 28 | 30 | −2 | 43 | |
| 13 | CRB Dar El Beïda (R) | 30 | 12 | 6 | 12 | 38 | 45 | −7 | 42 | Relegation to Ligue Régional I |
| 14 | MS Cherchell (R) | 30 | 10 | 9 | 11 | 42 | 41 | +1 | 39 | Relegation to Ligue Régional I |
| 15 | IRB Boumedfaa (R) | 30 | 6 | 3 | 21 | 27 | 70 | −43 | 21 | Relegation to Ligue Régional I |
| 16 | ES Berrouaghia (R) | 30 | 5 | 3 | 22 | 22 | 58 | −36 | 18 | Relegation to Ligue Régional I |

Updated to match(es) played on 1 June 2024. Source: lnf-amateur.dz
Rules for classification: 1) points; 2) head-to-head points; 3) head-to-head goal difference; 4) goal difference; 5) total goals; 6) fairplay ranking; 7) playoff.
(C) Champions; (P) Promoted; (R) Relegated

==== Group Centre East ====
| Pos | Team | Pld | W | D | L | GF | GA | GD | Pts | Promotion or relegation |
|---|---|---|---|---|---|---|---|---|---|---|
| 1 | IB Khemis El Khechna | 28 | 22 | 4 | 2 | 48 | 13 | +35 | 70 | Ligue 2 |
| 2 | A Bou Saada | 28 | 18 | 7 | 3 | 45 | 13 | +32 | 61 | |
| 3 | JS Boumerdès | 28 | 11 | 11 | 6 | 39 | 23 | +16 | 44 | |
| 4 | JS Djijel | 28 | 11 | 11 | 6 | 46 | 22 | +24 | 44 | |
| 5 | USB Berhoum | 28 | 10 | 11 | 7 | 48 | 30 | +18 | 41 | |
| 6 | MB Bouira | 28 | 11 | 7 | 10 | 38 | 32 | +6 | 40 | |
| 7 | ES Bouakal | 28 | 10 | 8 | 10 | 39 | 22 | +17 | 38 | |
| 8 | CRB Ouled Djellal | 28 | 10 | 7 | 11 | 35 | 28 | +7 | 37 | |
| 9 | USM Sétif | 28 | 13 | 4 | 11 | 40 | 29 | +11 | 37 (Note: USM Sétif were deducted 6 points.) | |
| 10 | NARB Réghaïa | 28 | 10 | 6 | 12 | 31 | 31 | 0 | 36 | |
| 11 | WR M'Sila | 28 | 10 | 6 | 12 | 41 | 35 | +6 | 36 | |
| 12 | CR Village Moussa | 28 | 9 | 8 | 11 | 42 | 21 | +21 | 35 | Ranking for Relegation |
| 13 | NRB Grarem | 28 | 10 | 5 | 13 | 30 | 34 | −4 | 35 | Relegation to Ligue Régional I |
| 14 | RC Boumerdès | 28 | 2 | 7 | 19 | 19 | 90 | −71 | 11 (Note: RC Boumerdes were deducted 2 points.) | Relegation to Ligue Régional I |
| 15 | OB Medjana | 28 | 2 | 0 | 26 | 10 | 128 | −118 | 6 | Relegation to Ligue Régional I |
| 16 | DRB Tadjenanet | 0 | - | - | - | - | - | — | 0 | Eliminate and drop to pre-honor division. |

Updated to match(es) played on 1 June 2024. Source: lnf-amateur.dz
Rules for classification: 1) points; 2) head-to-head points; 3) head-to-head goal difference; 4) goal difference; 5) total goals; 6) fairplay ranking; 7) playoff.

== National Cups ==
=== Algerian Cup ===
This competition was cancelled.

== Women's football ==
=== Algerian Women's Championship ===
| Pos | Team | Pld | W | D | L | GF | GA | GD | Pts | Qualification or relegation | AR | JFK | CFA | ASSN | FCC | ASAC | ASIO | FCB | ARG | MZB | ASOC |
|---|---|---|---|---|---|---|---|---|---|---|---|---|---|---|---|---|---|---|---|---|---|
| 1 | Afak Relizane (C) | 20 | 17 | 3 | 0 | 104 | 8 | +96 | 54 | Qualification for 2022 CAF W-CL | — | 0–0 | 4–1 | 3–0 | 2–1 | 4–2 | 9–0 | 3–0 | 4–0 | 10–0 | 22–0 |
| 2 | JF Khroub | 20 | 16 | 3 | 1 | 72 | 7 | +65 | 51 | | 0–0 | — | 0–0 | 2–3 | 2–0 | 1–0 | 4–0 | 4–0 | 10–0 | 8–0 | 8–0 |
| 3 | CF Akbou | 20 | 15 | 2 | 3 | 80 | 18 | +62 | 47 | | 1–5 | 0–1 | — | 2–2 | 2–1 | 2–1 | 8–0 | 2–1 | 4–1 | 8–0 | 13–0 |
| 4 | AS Sûreté Nationale | 20 | 13 | 2 | 5 | 80 | 26 | +54 | 41 | | 0–4 | 1–3 | 0–1 | — | 2–0 | 3–1 | 5–1 | 4–0 | 5–1 | 11–0 | 13–0 |
| 5 | FC Constantine | 20 | 12 | 2 | 6 | 62 | 17 | +45 | 38 | | 2–2 | 0–2 | 1–2 | 3–1 | — | 1–0 | 9–0 | 4–0 | 6–0 | 9–0 | 7–1 |
| 6 | ASE Alger Centre | 20 | 10 | 2 | 8 | 58 | 18 | +40 | 32 | | 0–3 | 0–1 | 0–1 | 1–1 | 1–1 | — | 4–0 | 2–0 | 2–0 | 6–0 | 6–0 |
| 7 | AS Intissar Oran | 20 | 5 | 2 | 13 | 14 | 72 | −58 | 17 | | 0–8 | 1–7 | 1–4 | 2–6 | 0–1 | 0–3 | — | 1–1 | 1–0 | 1–0 | 2–0 |
| 8 | FC Béjaïa | 20 | 3 | 4 | 13 | 17 | 48 | −31 | 13 | | 0–3 | 0–2 | 0–3 | 2–4 | 0–5 | 0–6 | 1–1 | — | 5–1 | 3–0 | 3–1 |
| 9 | AR Guelma | 20 | 4 | 1 | 15 | 12 | 68 | −56 | 13 | | 0–5 | 1–3 | 0–4 | 0–7 | 0–4 | 0–6 | 2–1 | 1–0 | — | 0–0 | 4–0 |
| 10 | MZ Biskra | 20 | 1 | 3 | 16 | 5 | 87 | −82 | 6 | | 1–6 | 1–2 | 0–6 | 0–4 | 0–3 | 0–6 | 0–1 | 0–0 | 0–1 | — | 1–0 |
| 11 | AS Oran Centre | 20 | 1 | 2 | 17 | 6 | 141 | −135 | 5 | Relegated | 0–7 | 0–12 | 0–16 | 0–8 | 0–4 | 0–11 | 0–1 | 1–1 | 1–0 | 2–2 | — |

Updated to match(es) played on 1 April 2022. Source: lff.dz
Legend: Blue = home team win; Yellow = draw; Red = away team win.
Rules for classification: 1) Points; 2) Goal difference; 3) Number of goals scored
(C) Champions

=== Algerian Women's Cup ===
This competition was cancelled.

== Managerial changes ==
This is a list of changes of managers within Algerian Ligue Professionnelle 1:

| Team | Outgoing manager | Manner of departure | Date of vacancy | Position in table | Incoming manager | Date of appointment |
|---|---|---|---|---|---|---|
| USM Alger | (Algeria) Mounir Zeghdoud | End of contract | 25 August 2021 | Pre-season | (France) Denis Lavagne | 25 August 2021 |
| CS Constantine | (Algeria) Yacine Manaa | End of caretaker spell | 25 August 2021 | Pre-season | (Algeria) Chérif Hadjar | 25 August 2021 |
| JS Kabylie | (Algeria) Karim Kaced | End of caretaker spell | 25 August 2021 | Pre-season | (France) Henri Stambouli | 25 August 2021 |
| CR Belouizdad | (Serbia) Zoran Manojlović | End of contract | 25 August 2021 | Pre-season | (Brazil) Marcos Paquetá | 23 September 2021 |
| MC Alger | (Algeria) Saber Bensmain | End of caretaker spell | 25 August 2021 | Pre-season | (Tunisia) Khaled Ben Yahia | 1 September 2021 |
| WA Tlemcen | (Algeria) Abdelkader Amrani | End of contract | 25 August 2021 | Pre-season | (Algeria) Kamel Bouhellal | 7 September 2021 |
| MC Oran | (Algeria) Abdelatif Bouazza | End of caretaker spell | 25 August 2021 | Pre-season | (Algeria) Azzedine Aït Djoudi | 8 September 2021 |
| JS Saoura | (Algeria) Moustapha Djallit | End of caretaker spell | 25 August 2021 | Pre-season | (Tunisia) Kais Yâakoubi | 14 September 2021 |
| HB Chelghoum Laïd | (Algeria) Idris Benmessaoud | End of contract | 25 August 2021 | Pre-season | (Algeria) Meziane Ighil | 20 September 2021 |
| US Biskra | (Algeria) Azzedine Aït Djoudi | End of contract | 25 August 2021 | Pre-season | (Algeria) Youcef Bouzidi | 28 September 2021 |
| NA Hussein Dey | (Algeria) Abdelkader Yaïche | End of contract | 25 August 2021 | Pre-season | (Algeria) Karim Zaoui | 28 September 2021 |
| Olympique de Médéa | (Algeria) Noureddine Marouk | End of contract | 25 August 2021 | Pre-season | (Tunisia) Lotfi Sellimi | 7 October 2021 |
| JS Kabylie | (France) Henri Stambouli | Mutual consent | 26 October 2021 | Pre-season | (Tunisia) Ammar Souayah | 2 November 2021 |
| WA Tlemcen | (Algeria) Kamel Bouhellal | Mutual consent | 13 November 2021 | 13th | (Algeria) Meziane Ighil | 14 December 2021 |
| MC Oran | (Algeria) Azzedine Aït Djoudi | Resigned | 13 November 2021 | 12th | (Tunisia) Moez Bouakaz | 20 November 2021 |
| HB Chelghoum Laïd | (Algeria) Meziane Ighil | Mutual consent | 20 November 2021 | 16th | (Algeria) Aziz Abbès | 25 December 2021 |
| NC Magra | (Algeria) Aziz Abbès | Resigned | 9 December 2021 | 18th | (Tunisia) Lassaad Maamar | 13 December 2021 |
| NA Hussein Dey | (Algeria) Karim Zaoui | Resigned | 23 December 2021 | 10th | (Algeria) Chérif Abdeslam | 23 December 2021 |
| USM Alger | (France) Denis Lavagne | Sacked | 24 December 2021 | 9th | (Algeria) Azzedine Rahim | 24 December 2021 |
| RC Arbaâ | (Algeria) Abdelghani Boufennara | Sacked | 4 January 2022 | 16th | (Algeria) Faiçal Kebbiche | 4 January 2022 |
| RC Relizane | (Algeria) Lyamine Bougherara | Resigned | 10 January 2022 | 13th | (Algeria) Noureddine Meguenni | 10 January 2022 |
| WA Tlemcen | (Algeria) Meziane Ighil | Sacked | 15 January 2022 | 13th | (Algeria) Sid Ahmed Slimani | 17 January 2022 |
| Olympique de Médéa | (Tunisia) Lotfi Sellimi | Mutual consent | 25 January 2022 | 11th | (Algeria) Karim Zaoui | 14 February 2022 |
| NA Hussein Dey | (Algeria) Chérif Abdeslam | Resigned | 5 February 2022 | 15th | (Algeria) Mohamed Mekhazni | 6 March 2022 |
| USM Alger | (Algeria) Azzedine Rahim | End of caretaker spell | 9 February 2022 | 3rd | (Serbia) Zlatko Krmpotić | 9 February 2022 |
| MC Oran | (Tunisia) Moez Bouakaz | Sacked | 10 February 2022 | 13th | (Algeria) Abdelkader Amrani | 11 February 2022 |
| Paradou AC | (Algeria) Tahar Chérif El-Ouazzani | Resigned | 16 February 2022 | 3rd | (North Macedonia) Boško Gjurovski | 20 March 2022 |
| CS Constantine | (Algeria) Chérif Hadjar | Resigned | 16 February 2022 | 7th | (Algeria) Kheïreddine Madoui | 1 March 2022 |
| HB Chelghoum Laïd | (Algeria) Aziz Abbès | Resigned | 23 February 2022 | 14th | (Algeria) Imad Mehal | 23 February 2022 |
| ES Sétif | (Tunisia) Nabil Kouki | Mutual consent | 28 February 2022 | 6th | (Algeria) Rédha Bendris | 28 February 2022 |
| NA Hussein Dey | (Algeria) Mohamed Mekhazni | Resigned | 15 March 2022 | 15th | (Algeria) Lyamine Bougherara | 15 March 2022 |
| JS Saoura | (Tunisia) Kais Yakoubi | Mutual consent | 9 April 2022 | 2nd | (Algeria) Moustapha Djallit | 9 April 2022 |
| ES Sétif | (Algeria) Rédha Bendris | End of caretaker spell | 17 April 2022 | 9th | (Serbia) Darko Nović | 17 April 2022 |
| USM Alger | (Serbia) Zlatko Krmpotić | Sacked | 18 April 2022 | 3rd | (Morocco) Jamil Benouahi | 18 April 2022 |
| HB Chelghoum Laïd | (Algeria) Imad Mehal | End of caretaker spell | 20 April 2022 | 14th | (Algeria) Chérif Hadjar | 20 April 2022 |
| Paradou AC | (North Macedonia) Boško Gjurovski | Resigned | 9 May 2022 | 3rd | (Portugal) Francisco Chaló | 10 May 2022 |

== Deaths ==
- 17 August 2021: Chaib Haddou, 72, MC Oran forward.
- 23 September 2021: Rachid Dali, 74, JSM Béjaïa and JS Kabylie forward.
- 29 October 2021: Mehdi Cerbah, 68, USM Alger JS Kabylie and RC Kouba goalkeeper.
- 10 June 2022: Billel Benhammouda, 24, USMM Hadjout and USM Alger attacking midfielder.
