= 2021–22 Algerian Ligue Professionnelle 1 =

Algerian Ligue Professionnelle 1
- Season: 2021–22
- Dates: 22 October 2021 – 17 June 2022
- Champions: CR Belouizdad
- Relegated: Olympique de Médéa; NA Hussein Dey; RC Relizane; WA Tlemcen
- Champions League: CR Belouizdad; JS Kabylie
- Confederation Cup: JS Saoura; USM Alger
- Matches: 306
- Goals: 692 (2.26 per match)
- Top goalscorer: Samy Frioui (17 goals)
- Biggest home win: ES Sétif 7–0 RC Relizane (10 May 2022)
- Biggest away win: RC Relizane 0–8 CR Belouizdad (27 May 2022)
- Highest scoring: MC Alger 8–2 RC Relizane (13 March 2022)
- Longest winning run: USM Alger (6 matches)
- Longest unbeaten run: MC Oran (14 matches)
- Longest winless run: WA Tlemcen (14 matches)
- Longest losing run: Olympique de Médéa (12 matches)
- All statistics correct as of 17 June 2022.

The 2021–22 Algerian Ligue Professionnelle 1 was the 60th season of the Algerian Ligue Professionnelle 1 since its establishment in 1962. A total of 18 teams contested the league. It began on 8 October 2021 and concluded on 17 June 2022.

== Teams ==
18 teams contest the league. HB Chelghoum Laïd and RC Arbâa were promoted from the 2020–21 Ligue 2.

Locations of teams for the 2021–22 Algerian Ligue Professionnelle 1

=== Stadiums ===
Note: Table lists in alphabetical order.

Team	Home city	Stadium	Capacity
ASO Chlef	Chlef	Mohamed Boumezrag Stadium	18,000
CR Belouizdad	Algiers	20 August 1955 Stadium	10,000
CS Constantine	Constantine	Ramadane Ben Abdelmalek Stadium	13,000
ES Sétif	Sétif	8 May 1945 Stadium	25,000
HB Chelghoum Laïd	Chelghoum Laïd	11 December 1961 Stadium	10,000
JS Kabylie	Tizi Ouzou	1 November 1954 Stadium	20,000
JS Saoura	Béchar	20 August 1955 Stadium	20,000
MC Alger	Algiers	Stade 5 Juillet 1962	64,000
MC Oran	Oran	Ahmed Zabana Stadium	40,000
NA Hussein Dey	Algiers	20 August 1955 Stadium	10,000
NC Magra	Magra	Boucheligue Brothers Stadium	8,000
Olympique de Médéa	Médéa	Imam Lyes Stadium	12,000
Paradou AC	Algiers	Omar Benrabah Stadium	8,000
RC Arbaâ	Larbaâ	Ismaïl Makhlouf Stadium	5,000
RC Relizane	Relizane	Tahar Zoughari Stadium	30,000
US Biskra	Biskra	18 February Stadium	24,000
USM Alger	Algiers	Omar Hamadi Stadium	12,000
WA Tlemcen	Tlemcen	Colonel Lotfi Stadium	18,000

=== Personnel and kits ===
Team	Manager	Captain	Kit manufacturer
ASO Chlef	(Algeria) Samir Zaoui	(Algeria) Mohamed Roufid Arab	Macron
CR Belouizdad	(Brazil) Marcos Paquetá	(Algeria) Chemseddine Nessakh	Adidas
CS Constantine	(Algeria) Cherif Hadjar	(Algeria) Zidane Mebarakou	Macron
ES Sétif	(Tunisia) Nabil Kouki	(Algeria) Abdelmoumene Djabou	Offside
HB Chelghoum Laïd	(Algeria) Meziane Ighil	(Algeria) Achref Aïb	Legea
JS Kabylie	(France) Henri Stambouli	(Algeria) Rédha Bensayah	Joma
JS Saoura	(Tunisia) Kais Yakoubi	(Algeria) Adel Bouchiba	Macron
MC Alger	(Tunisia) Khaled Ben Yahia	(Algeria) Abderahmane Hachoud	Joma
MC Oran	(Algeria) Azzedine Aït Djoudi	(Algeria) Mohamed Lagraâ	Cuippssi
NA Hussein Dey	(Algeria) Karim Zaoui	(Algeria) Faouzi Yaya	KCS
NC Magra	(Algeria) Aziz Abbès	(Algeria) Akram Demane	Macron
Olympique de Médéa	(Tunisia) Lotfi Sellimi	(Algeria) Sid Ali Lakroum	KCS
Paradou AC	(Algeria) Tahar Chérif El-Ouazzani	(Algeria) Tarek Bouabta	Macron
RC Arbaâ	(Algeria) Abdelhakim Boufennara	(Algeria) Mohamed Billal Rait	KCS
RC Relizane	(Algeria) Lyamine Bougherara	(Algeria) Mustapha Zaidi	Sarson
US Biskra	(Algeria) Youcef Bouzidi	(Algeria) Nacereddine Khoualed	Rina
USM Alger	(France) Denis Lavagne	(Algeria) Mohamed Lamine Zemmamouche	Kappa
WA Tlemcen	(Algeria) Kamel Bouhellal	(Algeria) Ahmida Zenasni	Kelme

=== Managerial changes ===
Team	Outgoing manager	Manner of departure	Date of vacancy	Position in table	Incoming manager	Date of appointment
USM Alger	(Algeria) Mounir Zeghdoud	End of contract	25 August 2021	Pre-season	(France) Denis Lavagne	25 August 2021
CS Constantine	(Algeria) Yacine Manaa	End of caretaker spell	25 August 2021	Pre-season	(Algeria) Chérif Hadjar	25 August 2021
JS Kabylie	(Algeria) Karim Kaced	End of caretaker spell	25 August 2021	Pre-season	(France) Henri Stambouli	25 August 2021
CR Belouizdad	(Serbia) Zoran Manojlović	End of contract	25 August 2021	Pre-season	(Brazil) Marcos Paquetá	23 September 2021
MC Alger	(Algeria) Saber Bensmain	End of caretaker spell	25 August 2021	Pre-season	(Tunisia) Khaled Ben Yahia	1 September 2021
WA Tlemcen	(Algeria) Abdelkader Amrani	End of contract	25 August 2021	Pre-season	(Algeria) Kamel Bouhellal	7 September 2021
MC Oran	(Algeria) Abdelatif Bouazza	End of caretaker spell	25 August 2021	Pre-season	(Algeria) Azzedine Aït Djoudi	8 September 2021
JS Saoura	(Algeria) Moustapha Djallit	End of caretaker spell	25 August 2021	Pre-season	(Tunisia) Kais Yâakoubi	14 September 2021
HB Chelghoum Laïd	(Algeria) Idris Benmessaoud	End of contract	25 August 2021	Pre-season	(Algeria) Meziane Ighil	20 September 2021
US Biskra	(Algeria) Azzedine Aït Djoudi	End of contract	25 August 2021	Pre-season	(Algeria) Youcef Bouzidi	28 September 2021
NA Hussein Dey	(Algeria) Abdelkader Yaïche	End of contract	25 August 2021	Pre-season	(Algeria) Karim Zaoui	28 September 2021
Olympique de Médéa	(Algeria) Noureddine Marouk	End of contract	25 August 2021	Pre-season	(Tunisia) Lotfi Sellimi	7 October 2021
JS Kabylie	(France) Henri Stambouli	Mutual consent	26 October 2021	Pre-season	(Tunisia) Ammar Souayah	2 November 2021
WA Tlemcen	(Algeria) Kamel Bouhellal	Mutual consent	13 November 2021	13th	(Algeria) Meziane Ighil	14 December 2021
MC Oran	(Algeria) Azzedine Aït Djoudi	Resigned	13 November 2021	12th	(Tunisia) Moez Bouakaz	20 November 2021
HB Chelghoum Laïd	(Algeria) Meziane Ighil	Mutual consent	20 November 2021	16th	(Algeria) Aziz Abbès	25 December 2021
NC Magra	(Algeria) Aziz Abbès	Resigned	9 December 2021	18th	(Tunisia) Lassaad Maamar	13 December 2021
NA Hussein Dey	(Algeria) Karim Zaoui	Resigned	23 December 2021	10th	(Algeria) Chérif Abdeslam	23 December 2021
USM Alger	(France) Denis Lavagne	Sacked	24 December 2021	9th	(Algeria) Azzedine Rahim	24 December 2021
RC Arbaâ	(Algeria) Abdelghani Boufennara	Sacked	4 January 2022	16th	(Algeria) Faiçal Kebbiche	4 January 2022
RC Relizane	(Algeria) Lyamine Bougherara	Resigned	10 January 2022	13th	(Algeria) Noureddine Meguenni	10 January 2022
WA Tlemcen	(Algeria) Meziane Ighil	Sacked	15 January 2022	13th	(Algeria) Sid Ahmed Slimani	17 January 2022
Olympique de Médéa	(Tunisia) Lotfi Sellimi	Mutual consent	25 January 2022	11th	(Algeria) Karim Zaoui	14 February 2022
NA Hussein Dey	(Algeria) Chérif Abdeslam	Resigned	5 February 2022	15th	(Algeria) Mohamed Mekhazni	6 March 2022
USM Alger	(Algeria) Azzedine Rahim	End of caretaker spell	9 February 2022	3rd	(Serbia) Zlatko Krmpotić	9 February 2022
MC Oran	(Tunisia) Moez Bouakaz	Sacked	10 February 2022	13th	(Algeria) Abdelkader Amrani	11 February 2022
Paradou AC	(Algeria) Tahar Chérif El-Ouazzani	Resigned	16 February 2022	3rd	(North Macedonia) Boško Gjurovski	20 March 2022
CS Constantine	(Algeria) Chérif Hadjar	Resigned	16 February 2022	7th	(Algeria) Kheïreddine Madoui	1 March 2022
HB Chelghoum Laïd	(Algeria) Aziz Abbès	Resigned	23 February 2022	14th	(Algeria) Imad Mehal	23 February 2022
ES Sétif	(Tunisia) Nabil Kouki	Mutual consent	28 February 2022	6th	(Algeria) Rédha Bendris	28 February 2022
NA Hussein Dey	(Algeria) Mohamed Mekhazni	Resigned	15 March 2022	15th	(Algeria) Lyamine Bougherara	15 March 2022
JS Saoura	(Tunisia) Kais Yakoubi	Mutual consent	9 April 2022	2nd	(Algeria) Moustapha Djallit	9 April 2022
ES Sétif	(Algeria) Rédha Bendris	End of caretaker spell	17 April 2022	9th	(Serbia) Darko Nović	17 April 2022
USM Alger	(Serbia) Zlatko Krmpotić	Sacked	18 April 2022	3rd	(Morocco) Jamil Benouahi	18 April 2022
HB Chelghoum Laïd	(Algeria) Imad Mehal	End of caretaker spell	20 April 2022	14th	(Algeria) Chérif Hadjar	20 April 2022
Paradou AC	(North Macedonia) Boško Gjurovski	Resigned	9 May 2022	3rd	(Portugal) Francisco Chaló	10 May 2022

=== Foreign players ===
Club	Player 1	Player 2
ASO Chlef	(Burkina Faso) ~~Yaya Banhoro~~	(Niger) ~~Ousseini Soumaila~~
CR Belouizdad		
CS Constantine	(Benin) Marcellin Koukpo	
ES Sétif	(Libya) Ibrahim Bodabous	(Ghana) Daniel Lomotey
HB Chelghoum Laïd		
JS Kabylie	(Ethiopia) ~~Mujib Kassim~~ (Burkina Faso) Lamine Ouattara	(Mali) Yacouba Doumbia
JS Saoura	(Tanzania) ~~Adam Salamba~~	
MC Alger	(Ghana) Joseph Esso	(Ivory Coast) Isla Daoudi Diomande
MC Oran	(Cameroon) Tony Abega	
NA Hussein Dey		
NC Magra		
Olympique de Médéa		
Paradou AC	(Uganda) Allan Okello	
RC Arbaâ		
RC Relizane		
US Biskra		
USM Alger	(Ghana) Kwame Opoku	(Burkina Faso) Hamed Belem
WA Tlemcen		

== League table ==
Pos	Team	Pld	W	D	L	GF	GA	GD	Pts	Qualification or relegation
1	CR Belouizdad (C)	34	21	7	6	54	22	+32	70	Qualification for CAF Champions League
2	JS Kabylie	34	16	13	5	40	20	+20	61	Qualification for CAF Champions League
3	JS Saoura	34	17	9	8	59	23	+36	60	Qualification for CAF Confederation Cup
4	USM Alger	34	15	12	7	45	22	+23	57	Qualification for CAF Confederation Cup
5	CS Constantine	34	15	10	9	46	29	+17	55	
6	Paradou AC	34	16	6	12	43	36	+7	54 (Note: Paradou AC finished ahead of ES Sétif on head-to-head points: Paradou AC 1–0 ES Sétif, ES Sétif 0–1 Paradou AC.)	
7	ES Sétif	34	15	9	10	43	24	+19	54	
8	MC Alger	34	13	12	9	36	24	+12	51	
9	ASO Chlef	34	13	11	10	38	31	+7	50 (Note: ASO Chlef finished ahead of US Biskra on head-to-head goal difference: US Biskra 2–1 ASO Chlef, ASO Chlef 2–0 US Biskra.)	
10	US Biskra	34	13	11	10	36	32	+4	50	
11	MC Oran	34	10	16	8	32	29	+3	46	
12	HB Chelghoum Laïd	34	11	12	11	40	41	−1	45	
13	NC Magra	34	13	6	15	31	36	−5	45	
14	RC Arbaâ	34	10	13	11	40	45	−5	43	
15	Olympique de Médéa (R)	34	10	6	18	32	53	−21	36	Relegation to Algerian Ligue 2
16	NA Hussein Dey (R)	34	5	7	22	33	66	−33	22	Relegation to Algerian Ligue 2
17	RC Relizane (R)	34	4	8	22	31	87	−56	20	Relegation to Algerian Ligue 2
18	WA Tlemcen (R)	34	3	4	27	13	72	−59	13	Relegation to Algerian Ligue 2

Updated to match(es) played on 17 June 2022. Source: the-sports.org
Rules for classification: 1) points; 2) head-to-head points; 3) head-to-head goal difference; 4) goal difference; 5) total goals; 6) fairplay ranking; 7) playoff.
(C) Champions; (R) Relegated

== Results ==
Home \ Away	ASO	CRB	CSC	ESS	HBCL	JSK	JSS	MCA	MCO	NAHD	NCM	OM	PAC	RCA	RCR	USB	USMA	WAT
ASO Chlef		1–2	1–0	0–1	1–0	1–1	2–2	1–1	1–1	0–0	0–0	0–1	0–0	2–0	1–0	2–0	2–1	4–0
CR Belouizdad	3–1		1–1	1–0	0–1	0–1	1–0	1–0	3–0	1–0	1–2	2–1	2–0	1–1	2–0	2–0	1–0	3–0
CS Constantine	2–0	1–2		1–0	3–3	2–1	1–0	3–0	0–1	2–1	1–0	1–0	1–0	1–1	4–0	0–0	1–1	5–0
ES Sétif	0–0	2–2	1–0		1–0	1–1	0–0	2–1	0–1	5–1	0–2	3–0	0–1	3–1	7–0	2–0	3–1	1–0
HB Chelghoum Laïd	1–0	0–0	1–1	1–0		1–3	0–0	2–0	0–0	0–1	2–0	2–0	3–0	1–1	1–1	3–1	0–0	3–1
JS Kabylie	0–1	0–0	1–3	0–0	1–0		2–1	0–1	1–0	3–2	3–0	1–0	2–0	1–1	3–0	1–1	1–1	2–0
JS Saoura	2–2	0–1	2–0	1–1	5–0	1–0		0–0	2–0	5–0	1–0	4–0	4–1	0–0	6–0	2–0	1–0	6–0
MC Alger	1–2	2–1	0–0	2–0	1–0	0–2	2–0		0–0	2–0	2–1	0–0	1–0	1–0	8–2	1–1	0–1	2–0
MC Oran	1–0	0–0	2–1	0–0	2–2	0–0	2–1	1–0		0–0	2–1	0–1	2–4	1–1	1–1	2–2	2–1	5–0
NA Hussein Dey	0–2	3–5	1–4	0–0	2–1	2–2	1–2	1–4	2–1		0–1	0–1	0–2	0–1	3–5	1–2	1–1	3–1
NC Magra	2–0	1–0	1–1	0–2	2–0	0–1	0–0	0–0	0–0	1–0		2–0	1–3	1–2	4–1	1–0	1–0	1–0
Olympique de Médéa	1–2	0–0	2–1	1–4	3–3	0–0	0–3	0–0	1–0	1–2	3–1		0–1	4–3	2–0	1–1	1–3	1–0
Paradou AC	1–0	1–3	1–1	1–0	6–2	0–0	1–0	1–1	0–0	1–1	3–1	2–1		1–2	3–0	1–0	0–1	1–0
RC Arbaâ	0–0	1–2	0–1	3–1	0–0	0–0	1–2	1–0	1–1	3–1	1–1	4–2	3–1		2–1	0–5	2–0	0–0
RC Relizane	4–5	0–8	1–1	0–1	1–2	1–4	1–2	0–0	0–2	2–1	1–2	2–1	0–2	3–3		1–1	0–0	2–1
US Biskra	2–1	0–1	2–0	1–1	2–0	0–1	2–1	0–0	2–2	2–1	1–0	2–1	1–0	1–0	1–0		0–0	0–0
USM Alger	1–1	2–0	2–0	1–0	1–1	0–0	0–0	1–1	0–0	1–0	4–1	4–0	2–1	4–0	3–1	3–0		2–0
WA Tlemcen	0–2	0–2	0–2	0–1	1–4	0–1	2–3	0–2	1–0	2–2	1–0	0–2	1–3	2–1	0–0	0–3	0–3	

Updated to match(es) played on 17 June 2022. Source: the-sports.org
Legend: Blue = home team win; Yellow = draw; Red = away team win.

== Positions by round ==
Team ╲ Round	1	2	3	4	5	6	7	8	9	10	11	12	13	14	15	16	17	18	19	20	21	22	23	24	25	26	27	28	29	30	31	32	33	34
ASO Chlef	14	17	16	15	14	14	14	12	13	13	11	12	15	17	12	11	11	11	10	11	10	10	10	9	9	9	8	7	9	9	9	9	9	9
CR Belouizdad	12	13	9	6	8	7	4	2	1	1	2	3	1	1	1	1	1	1	1	1	1	1	1	1	1	1	1	1	1	1	1	1	1	1
CS Constantine	13	14	10	7	5	6	8	4	7	5	5	2	5	7	6	6	7	9	9	9	8	7	7	5	6	6	5	6	6	8	8	7	6	5
ES Sétif	7	7	7	10	10	9	5	8	6	7	6	5	6	5	5	4	5	7	7	6	7	8	8	8	7	7	9	8	7	5	7	6	7	7
HB Chelghoum Laïd	16	16	17	16	17	16	15	16	14	14	13	16	13	15	15	16	14	14	14	14	14	14	14	14	14	14	14	14	14	12	12	13	12	12
JS Kabylie	10	12	11	11	11	11	11	11	10	10	9	9	7	6	7	8	8	5	6	4	4	4	3	3	2	2	2	2	2	2	2	2	2	2
JS Saoura	1	8	4	5	4	5	2	6	4	4	4	6	3	3	3	2	2	2	2	2	2	2	2	2	3	5	4	5	3	4	3	3	3	3
MC Alger	3	6	2	3	9	8	9	5	3	3	3	4	4	4	2	5	6	8	5	3	3	3	4	4	5	4	6	6	5	6	7	8	8	8
MC Oran	5	10	12	12	12	12	13	14	15	15	15	13	14	16	11	13	13	12	12	13	12	11	12	12	12	11	11	12	11	11	11	11	11	11
NA Hussein Dey	9	4	6	9	7	10	10	10	11	11	12	11	11	10	13	14	15	15	15	15	16	15	16	16	16	16	16	16	16	16	16	16	16	16
NC Magra	15	15	15	18	18	18	16	17	18	17	17	15	16	13	16	12	12	10	13	12	13	13	11	11	11	12	12	11	12	13	14	14	14	13
Olympique de Médéa	11	5	3	8	6	2	3	7	8	8	10	10	10	11	14	15	16	16	16	16	15	16	15	15	15	15	15	15	15	15	15	15	15	15
Paradou AC	6	2	5	2	2	3	6	3	2	2	1	1	2	2	4	3	3	4	4	7	5	5	5	6	4	3	3	3	4	3	4	5	5	6
RC Arbaâ	17	18	18	17	16	15	17	13	12	16	16	14	12	12	10	10	10	13	11	10	11	12	13	13	13	13	13	13	13	14	13	12	13	14
RC Relizane	18	11	14	13	13	13	12	15	16	12	14	17	17	14	17	17	17	17	17	17	17	17	17	17	17	17	17	17	17	17	17	17	17	17
US Biskra	2	1	1	1	1	1	1	1	5	6	7	8	8	8	8	9	9	6	8	8	9	9	9	10	10	10	10	10	10	10	10	10	10	10
USM Alger	8	3	8	4	3	4	7	9	9	9	8	7	9	9	9	7	4	3	3	5	6	6	6	7	8	8	7	9	8	7	5	4	4	4
WA Tlemcen	4	9	13	14	15	17	18	18	17	18	18	18	18	18	18	18	18	18	18	18	18	18	18	18	18	18	18	18	18	18	18	18	18	18

Leader
2022–23 CAF Champions League
2022–23 CAF Confederation Cup
2022–23 CAF Confederation Cup
Relegation to Algerian Ligue 2

Updated to match(es) played on 17 June 2022. Source: the-sports.org

== Clubs season-progress ==
Team ╲ Round	1	2	3	4	5	6	7	8	9	10	11	12	13	14	15	16	17	18	19	20	21	22	23	24	25	26	27	28	29	30	31	32	33	34
ASO Chlef	L	L	D	D	D	D	L	W	L	D	W	L	L	L	W	W	W	D	W	L	W	W	D	W	D	W	W	W	D	L	D	W	D	L
CR Belouizdad	L	D	W	W	D	W	W	W	W	W	D	L	W	W	W	L	W	W	W	W	D	W	W	D	W	W	L	L	D	W	D	W	L	W
CS Constantine	L	D	W	W	W	D	D	W	L	W	W	W	L	D	D	W	L	L	L	D	W	D	W	W	L	W	W	D	L	D	L	D	W	W
ES Sétif	W	D	D	D	D	W	W	L	W	L	W	W	D	W	D	W	L	L	D	W	L	L	L	W	W	L	L	W	W	W	L	D	D	W
HB Chelghoum Laïd	L	L	D	D	L	D	D	L	W	D	D	L	W	L	D	L	W	W	L	D	L	W	D	W	L	L	D	W	W	W	W	D	W	D
JS Kabylie	D	D	D	D	L	D	D	W	W	D	W	W	W	W	L	L	W	W	D	W	D	W	W	D	W	W	L	D	D	W	W	W	L	D
JS Saoura	W	L	W	D	W	D	W	L	W	W	D	L	W	W	D	W	D	W	W	D	W	L	D	L	L	D	W	L	W	L	W	D	W	W
MC Alger	W	D	W	D	L	W	D	W	W	W	D	D	D	W	W	L	L	L	W	W	W	D	D	D	L	W	L	W	D	L	L	L	D	D
MC Oran	W	L	L	D	L	D	L	D	D	D	L	W	D	L	W	L	W	W	D	L	W	D	D	W	D	W	D	D	D	W	D	D	W	D
NA Hussein Dey	D	W	D	D	W	L	L	D	L	L	L	W	D	L	L	L	L	L	W	L	L	D	L	L	W	L	L	D	L	L	L	L	L	L
NC Magra	L	D	L	L	L	L	W	L	L	W	L	W	L	W	L	W	W	W	L	D	L	W	W	W	D	D	L	W	L	L	D	D	W	W
Olympique de Médéa	D	W	W	L	W	W	D	L	L	L	L	L	L	L	L	L	L	L	L	W	D	L	W	D	W	L	W	L	W	W	L	D	L	D
Paradou AC	W	W	L	W	W	L	D	W	W	W	W	L	L	W	L	W	L	D	D	W	W	W	D	L	W	W	W	D	L	W	L	L	L	D
RC Arbaâ	L	L	D	D	D	D	L	W	D	L	L	W	W	L	W	W	D	L	W	D	D	L	D	D	D	L	W	D	W	L	W	W	D	L
RC Relizane	L	W	L	D	L	D	D	L	L	W	L	L	D	W	L	L	L	L	D	D	L	D	L	L	L	L	L	L	L	L	W	L	D	L
US Biskra	W	W	W	L	W	D	W	D	L	L	D	D	W	L	W	L	W	W	L	D	D	L	L	L	D	L	W	W	D	D	W	D	D	W
USM Alger	D	W	L	W	W	D	D	L	D	L	W	W	D	D	W	W	W	W	L	D	D	D	D	D	D	L	W	L	W	W	W	W	W	L
WA Tlemcen	W	L	L	L	L	L	L	D	D	L	D	L	L	L	L	W	L	L	D	L	L	L	L	L	L	W	L	L	L	L	L	L	L	L

Updated to match(es) played on 17 June 2022. Source: the-sports.org
W = Win; D = Draw; L = Lose

== Season statistics ==
=== Top scorers ===
Rank	Goalscorer	Club	Goals
1	(Algeria) Samy Frioui	MC Alger	17
2	(Algeria) Ahmed Nadhir Benbouali	Paradou AC	14
2	(Algeria) Yousri Bouzok	Paradou AC	14
4	(Algeria) Abou Sofiane Balegh	RC Relizane	13
5	(Algeria) Hichem Mokhtar	US Biskra	12
5	(Algeria) Belaid Hamidi	JS Saoura	12
6	(Benin) Marcellin Koukpo	CS Constantine	11
6	(Algeria) Kheireddine Merzougui	CR Belouizdad	11
9	(Algeria) Rédha Bensayah	JS Kabylie	10
9	(Algeria) Mehdi Boubakour	RC Arbaâ	10
9	(Algeria) Mohamed El Siddik Baali	Olympique de Médéa	10
9	(Algeria) Aimen Lahmeri	JS Saoura	10

Updated to games played on 17 June 2022
Source: soccerway.com

=== Hat-tricks ===
Player	For	Against	Result	Date	Ref
(Algeria) Belaid Hamidi	JS Saoura*	RC Relizane	6–0	2 November 2021	
(Algeria) Samy Frioui^{5}	MC Alger*	RC Relizane	8–2	13 March 2022	
(Algeria) Karim Aribi	CR Belouizdad*	NA Hussein Dey	5–3	27 March 2022	
(Algeria) Abdelmalek Oukil	RC Arbaâ*	Paradou AC	3–1	6 May 2022	
(Algeria) Abou Sofiane Balegh^{4}	RC Relizane*	NA Hussein Dey	5–3	21 May 2022	
(Algeria) Ramdane Hitala	NC Magra*	RC Relizane	4–1	10 June 2022	

^{5} – Player scored five goals. ^{4} – Player scored four goals.

=== Monthly awards ===
Month	Number of rounds	Player of the Month		
Month	Number of rounds	Player	Club	Ref
October-November	5	(Algeria) Ahmed Nadir Benbouali	Paradou AC	
December	5	(Algeria) Farid Chaâl	MC Alger	
January	6	(Algeria) Belaid Hamidi	JS Saoura	
February-March	7	(Burkina Faso) Lamine Ouattara	JS Kabylie	
April	5	(Algeria) Ahmed Nadir Benbouali	Paradou AC	
May-June	6	(Algeria) Abdelmalek Oukil	RC Arbaâ	

== See also ==
- 2021–22 Algerian Ligue 2
