= 2021–22 WA Tlemcen season =

WA Tlemcen
2021–22 season
- Head coach: Kamel Bouhellal (from 6 September 2021) (until 13 November 2021) Meziane Ighil (from 14 December 2021) (until 15 January 2022); Sid Ahmed Slimani (from 17 January 2022)
- Stadium: Colonel Lotfi Stadium
- Ligue 1: 18th (relegated)
- Top goalscorer: League: Redouane Bounoua (3 goals); All: Redouane Bounoua (3 goals)

In the 2021–22 season, WA Tlemcen competed in the Ligue 1 for the 30th season, as well as the Algerian Cup. It was their second consecutive season in the top flight of Algerian football. They competed in Ligue 1, and the Algerian Cup.

== Squad list ==
Players and squad numbers last updated on 20 October 2021.
Note: Flags indicate national team as has been defined under FIFA eligibility rules. Players may hold more than one non-FIFA nationality.

| No. | Nat. | Position | Name | Date of Birth (Age) | Signed from |
Goalkeepers
| 1 | (Algeria) | GK | Abdelwahab Saidi | 28 February 1999 (aged 22) | (Algeria) |
| 16 | (Algeria) | GK | Mohamed Bouchaour | 20 September 1993 (aged 28) | (Algeria) RCB Oued Rhiou |
| 27 | (Algeria) | GK | Nafaa Alloui | 17 March 1991 (aged 30) | (Algeria) US Biskra |
Defenders
| 2 | (Algeria) | RB | Racim Mebarki | 10 April 1998 (aged 23) | (Algeria) JS Kabylie |
| 3 | (Algeria) | LB | Juba Chirani | 4 January 1998 (aged 23) | (Algeria) Paradou AC |
| 4 | (Algeria) | RB | Soufyane Mebarki | 13 May 1986 (aged 35) | (Algeria) NC Magra |
| 5 | (Algeria) | CB | Youcef Kamel Messaoudi | 20 February 1994 (aged 27) | (Algeria) Youth System |
| 14 | (Algeria) | CB | Bilal Tizi Bouali | 14 December 1997 (aged 24) | (Algeria) JS Kabylie |
| 17 | (Algeria) | RB | Houssam Bahraoui | 23 May 1993 (aged 28) | (Algeria) JSM Skikda |
| 22 | (Algeria) | CB | Abderrazzak Bentoucha | 1 January 1996 (aged 26) | (Algeria) MCB Oued Sly |
Midfielders
| 6 | (Algeria) | MF | Mohamed Heriat | 25 August 1989 (aged 32) | (Algeria) AS Ain M'lila |
| 8 | (Algeria) | MF | Ahmida Zenasni | 10 July 1993 (aged 28) | (Algeria) JSM Béjaïa |
| 18 | (Algeria) | MF | Djamel Belalem | 12 August 1993 (aged 28) | (Algeria) Olympique de Médéa |
| 19 | (Algeria) | MF | Charif Nasseri | 6 October 1990 (aged 31) | (Algeria) JSM Skikda |
| 20 | (Algeria) | MF | Redouane Bounoua | 1 November 1998 (aged 23) | (Algeria) USM Bel Abbès |
| 23 | (Algeria) | MF | Issam Abdelhafid Guendouze | 28 March 2000 (aged 21) | (Algeria) Youth System |
| 26 | (Algeria) | MF | Houssem Ouassni | 24 October 1999 (aged 22) | (Algeria) Youth system |
Forwards
| 7 | (Algeria) | FW | Abdelwahid Belgherbi | 3 February 1990 (aged 31) | (Algeria) USM Bel Abbès |
| 9 | (Algeria) | FW | Mohamed Seguer | 7 September 1985 (aged 36) | (Algeria) RC Relizane |
| 10 | (Algeria) | FW | Mohamed Said Helal | 16 April 1998 (aged 23) | (Algeria) |
| 11 | (Algeria) | FW | Aymen Amoura | 4 January 1999 (aged 22) | (Algeria) IRB Maghnia |
| 12 | (Algeria) | FW | Karim Benhamida | 10 January 1999 (aged 22) | (Algeria) Youth system |
| 13 | (Algeria) | FW | Mohamed Amine Semahi | 22 June 1999 (aged 22) | (Algeria) Youth system |
| 15 | (Algeria) | FW | Sid Ali Mebarki | 13 July 1998 (aged 23) | (Algeria) Paradou AC |
| 21 | (Algeria) | FW | Kouceila Kasdi | 21 April 1996 (aged 25) | (Algeria) MO Bejaia |
| 24 | (Algeria) | FW | Fathallah Belmokhtar | 4 May 1998 (aged 23) | (Algeria) ASB Maghnia |
| 25 | (Algeria) | FW | Younes Anis Gali Zerargua | 16 November 1995 (aged 26) | (Algeria) MCB Oued Sly |

== Competitions ==
=== Overview ===
| Competition | Record | | | | | | | | Started round | Final position / round | First match | Last match |
| Competition | G | W | D | L | GF | GA | GD | Win % | Started round | Final position / round | First match | Last match |
|---|---|---|---|---|---|---|---|---|---|---|---|---|
| Ligue 1 | 34 | 3 | 4 | 27 | 13 | 72 | −59 | 8.82 | —N/a | 18th | 23 October 2021 | 11 June 2022 |
| Total | 34 | 3 | 4 | 27 | 13 | 72 | −59 | 8.82 | | | | |

Updated to match played 11 June 2022
Source: Competitions

== League table ==
| Pos | Team | Pld | W | D | L | GF | GA | GD | Pts | Qualification or relegation |
|---|---|---|---|---|---|---|---|---|---|---|
| 14 | RC Arbaâ | 34 | 10 | 13 | 11 | 40 | 45 | −5 | 43 | |
| 15 | Olympique de Médéa (R) | 34 | 10 | 6 | 18 | 32 | 53 | −21 | 36 | Relegation to Algerian Ligue 2 |
| 16 | NA Hussein Dey (R) | 34 | 5 | 7 | 22 | 33 | 66 | −33 | 22 | Relegation to Algerian Ligue 2 |
| 17 | RC Relizane (R) | 34 | 4 | 8 | 22 | 31 | 87 | −56 | 20 | Relegation to Algerian Ligue 2 |
| 18 | WA Tlemcen (R) | 34 | 3 | 4 | 27 | 13 | 72 | −59 | 13 | Relegation to Algerian Ligue 2 |

Updated to match(es) played on 17 June 2022. Source: the-sports.org
Rules for classification: 1) points; 2) head-to-head points; 3) head-to-head goal difference; 4) goal difference; 5) total goals; 6) fairplay ranking; 7) playoff.
(R) Relegated

=== Results summary ===
| Overall | | | | | | | | Home | | | | | | Away | | | | | |
| Pld | W | D | L | GF | GA | GD | Pts | W | D | L | GF | GA | GD | W | D | L | GF | GA | GD |
|---|---|---|---|---|---|---|---|---|---|---|---|---|---|---|---|---|---|---|---|
| 34 | 3 | 4 | 27 | 13 | 72 | −59 | 13 | 3 | 2 | 12 | 10 | 31 | −21 | 0 | 2 | 15 | 3 | 41 | −38 |

Last updated: 11 June 2022.
Source: Competitive matches

=== Results by round ===
| Round | 1 | 2 | 3 | 4 | 5 | 6 | 7 | 8 | 9 | 10 | 11 | 12 | 13 | 14 | 15 | 16 | 17 | 18 | 19 | 20 | 21 | 22 | 23 | 24 | 25 | 26 | 27 | 28 | 29 | 30 | 31 | 32 | 33 | 34 |
|---|---|---|---|---|---|---|---|---|---|---|---|---|---|---|---|---|---|---|---|---|---|---|---|---|---|---|---|---|---|---|---|---|---|---|
| Ground | H | A | A | H | A | H | A | H | A | H | A | H | A | H | A | H | A | A | H | H | A | H | A | H | A | H | A | H | A | H | A | H | A | H |
| Result | W | L | L | L | L | L | L | D | D | L | D | L | L | L | L | W | L | L | D | L | L | L | L | L | L | W | L | L | L | L | L | L | L | L |
| Position | 4 | 9 | 13 | 14 | 15 | 17 | 18 | 18 | 17 | 18 | 18 | 18 | 18 | 18 | 18 | 18 | 18 | 18 | 18 | 18 | 18 | 18 | 18 | 18 | 18 | 18 | 18 | 18 | 18 | 18 | 18 | 18 | 18 | 18 |

Updated to match(es) played on 17 June 2022. Source: Competitive matches
A = Away; H = Home; W = Win; D = Draw; L = Loss

=== Matches ===
The league fixtures were announced on 7 October 2021.

| 23 October 2021 Round 1 | WA Tlemcen | 1–0 | NC Magra | Tlemcen |
| 16:00 | Mebarki 30' | Report | | Stadium: Colonel Lotfi Stadium; Attendance: 0 (Note: The match was played behind closed doors due to the COVID-19 pandemic in Algeria.); Referee: Mohamed Amine Benzohra |

| 29 October 2021 Round 2 | RC Relizane | 2–1 | WA Tlemcen | Relizane |
| 15:00 | Belalia 15'; Hellal 49' | Report | Keniche 24' | Stadium: Tahar Zoughari Stadium; Referee: Hamza Boucetta |

| 7 November 2021 Round 3 | MC Alger | 2–0 | WA Tlemcen | Algiers |
| 18:00 | Frioui 77'; Esso 81' | Report | | Stadium: Stade du 5 Juillet; Referee: Abdelmoumen Touabti |

| 20 November 2021 Round 4 | WA Tlemcen | 0–2 | CS Constantine | Tlemcen |
| 15:00 | | Report | Hamzaoui 47', 58' | Stadium: Colonel Lotfi Stadium; Referee: Amine Sekhraoui |

| 25 November 2021 Round 5 | Paradou AC | 1–0 | WA Tlemcen | Dar El Beïda |
| 14:30 | Bouzok 71' (pen.) | Report | | Stadium: Omar Benrabah Stadium; Referee: Mohamad Salah Dafri |

| 3 December 2021 Round 6 | WA Tlemcen | 0–2 | Olympique de Médéa | Tlemcen |
| 15:00 | | Report | Baâli 34'; Lakroum 37' (pen.) | Stadium: Colonel Lotfi Stadium; Referee: Nadjib Meziani |

| 11 December 2021 Round 7 | ES Sétif | 1–0 | WA Tlemcen | Sétif |
| 17:00 | Kendouci 77' | Report | | Stadium: 8 May 1945 Stadium; Attendance: 0 (close doors); Referee: Houssam Benyahia |

| 18 December 2021 Round 8 | WA Tlemcen | 2–2 | NA Hussein Dey | Tlemcen |
| 13:30 | Belgherbi 73' (pen.); Gali Zerargua 90+5' | Report | Benseghir 60'; Derardja 82' | Stadium: Colonel Lotfi Stadium; Referee: Youcef Gamouh |

| 24 December 2021 Round 9 | RC Arbaâ | 0–0 | WA Tlemcen | Boufarik |
| 15:00 | | Report | | Stadium: Mohamed Reggaz Stadium; Referee: Akram Mechairia |

| 28 December 2021 Round 10 | WA Tlemcen | 2–3 | JS Saoura | Tlemcen |
| 14:00 | Bounoua 62'; Gali Zerargua 89' (pen.) | Report | Lahmeri 33' (pen.); Saâd 45', 84' | Stadium: Colonel Lotfi Stadium; Referee: Bilel Soltani |

| 3 January 2022 Round 11 | US Biskra | 0–0 | WA Tlemcen | Biskra |
| 14:00 | | Report | | Stadium: 18 February Stadium; Referee: Lotfi Bekouassa |

| 8 January 2022 Round 12 | WA Tlemcen | 0–3 | USM Alger | Tlemcen |
| 14:30 | Mebarki (yellow card) 36' | Report | Mahious 38'; Meziane 42', 57' | Stadium: Colonel Lotfi Stadium; Referee: Mohamed Tahar Milia |

| 15 January 2022 Round 13 | HB Chelghoum Laïd | 3–1 | WA Tlemcen | Chelghoum Laïd |
| 14:30 | Kemoukh 45'; Ghorab 58' (pen.), 73' | Report | Mebarki 89' | Stadium: 11 December 1961 Stadium; Referee: Amine Hansal |

| 21 January 2022 Round 14 | WA Tlemcen | 0–1 | JS Kabylie | Tlemcen |
| 15:00 | | Report | Bensayah 28' | Stadium: Colonel Lotfi Stadium; Referee: Ahmed Benhamou |

| 25 January 2022 Round 15 | ASO Chlef | 4–0 | WA Tlemcen | Chlef |
| 14:30 | Alili 16', 68'; Aliane 63', 76' | Report | | Stadium: Mohamed Boumezrag Stadium; Referee: Mohamed Amine Benzohra |

| 29 January 2022 Round 16 | WA Tlemcen | 1–0 | MC Oran | Tlemcen |
| 14:30 | Abderrazak Benamraoui 60' | Report | | Stadium: Colonel Lotfi Stadium; Referee: Abdelmoumen Touabti |

| 5 February 2022 Round 17 | CR Belouizdad | 3–0 | WA Tlemcen | Belouizdad |
| 14:30 | Merzougui 21'; Khalfallah 45'; Tabti 57' | Report | | Stadium: 20 August 1955 Stadium; Attendance: 0 (close doors); Referee: Nadjib Meziani |

| 25 February 2022 Round 18 | NC Magra | 1–0 | WA Tlemcen | Magra |
| 15:00 | Salah 37' | Report | | Stadium: Boucheligue Brothers Stadium; Attendance: 0 Referee: Amine Hansal |

| 1 March 2022 Round 19 | WA Tlemcen | 0–0 | RC Relizane | Tlemcen |
| 14:30 | | Report | | Stadium: Colonel Lotfi Stadium; Referee: Bilel Soltani |

| 5 March 2022 Round 20 | WA Tlemcen | 0–2 | MC Alger | Tlemcen |
| 14:30 | | Report | Esso 67'; Frioui 86' (pen.) | Stadium: Colonel Lotfi Stadium; Referee: Akram Mechairia |

| 13 March 2022 Round 21 | CS Constantine | 5–0 | WA Tlemcen | Constantine |
| 14:30 | Belaili 32'; Koukpo 47'; Lakdja 50'; Salhi 57' (pen.); Aiboud 81' | Report | | Stadium: Ramadane Ben Abdelmalek Stadium; Referee: Riadh Ammar Khodja |

| 19 March 2022 Round 22 | WA Tlemcen | 1–3 | Paradou AC | Tlemcen |
| 15:00 | Talbi 90+4' | Report | Bouzok 42'; Benbouali 45+1' (pen.); Boulbina 85' | Stadium: Colonel Lotfi Stadium; Referee: Ahmed Benhamou |

| 26 March 2022 Round 23 | Olympique de Médéa | 1–0 | WA Tlemcen | Médéa |
| 15:00 | Bouras 15' | Report | | Stadium: Imam Lyes Stadium; Referee: Youcef Gamouh |

| 25 May 2022 Round 24 | WA Tlemcen | 0–1 | ES Sétif | Tlemcen |
| 16:00 | | Report | Benayad 38' | Stadium: Colonel Lotfi Stadium; Referee: Redouane Allou |

| 12 April 2022 Round 25 | NA Hussein Dey | 3–1 | WA Tlemcen | Belouizdad |
| 15:45 | Meddahi 22' (pen.); Boussalem 45+1'; Yaya 77' | Report | Ouassini 50' | Stadium: 20 August 1955 Stadium; Attendance: 0 (close doors); Referee: Mohamad Salah Dafri |

| 16 April 2022 Round 26 | WA Tlemcen | 2–1 | RC Arbaâ | Tlemcen |
| 15:45 | Bounoua 65', 70' | Report | Toumi 70' | Stadium: Colonel Lotfi Stadium; Referee: Abdelmoumen Touabti |

| 23 April 2022 Round 27 | JS Saoura | 6–0 | WA Tlemcen | Béchar |
| 22:30 | Bellatreche 4'; Saâdi 23'; Bouziani 39'; Lahmeri 67'; Hamidi 75', 85' | Report | | Stadium: 20 August 1955 Stadium; Referee: Marouane Mohamed Belkebir |

| 29 April 2022 Round 28 | WA Tlemcen | 0–3 | US Biskra | Tlemcen |
| 15:45 | | Report | Khoualed 5'; Mokhtar 18', 80' | Stadium: Colonel Lotfi Stadium; Referee: Mohamed Amine Benzohra |

| 6 May 2022 Round 29 | USM Alger | 2–0 | WA Tlemcen | Bologhine |
| 18:00 | Othmani 44'; Ait El Hadj 79' | Report | | Stadium: Omar Hamadi Stadium; Attendance: 0 (close doors); Referee: Rafik Aouina |

| 14 May 2022 Round 30 | WA Tlemcen | 1–4 | HB Chelghoum Laïd | Tlemcen |
| 16:00 | Lakehal 63' | Report | Harrari 7', 8'; Kaibou 23'; Medjahdaoui 77' (o.g.) | Stadium: Colonel Lotfi Stadium; Referee: Ahmed Benhamou |

| 21 May 2022 Round 31 | JS Kabylie | 2–0 | WA Tlemcen | Tizi Ouzou |
| 17:45 | Boukhanchouche 8'; Mouaki 64' | Report | | Stadium: 1 November 1954 Stadium; Referee: Alaa Bouab |

| 29 May 2022 Round 32 | WA Tlemcen | 0–2 | ASO Chlef | Tlemcen |
| 16:45 | | Report | Souibaâh 63'; Bengrina 90+4' | Stadium: Colonel Lotfi Stadium; Referee: Elhadj Chihaoui |

| 5 June 2022 Round 33 | MC Oran | 5–0 | WA Tlemcen | Oran |
| 19:00 | Siam 4'; Guenina 12' (pen.); Belaribi 24'; Dahar 70', 83' | Report | | Stadium: Ahmed Zabana Stadium; Referee: Hadj Aissa Semache |

| 11 June 2022 Round 34 | WA Tlemcen | 0–2 | CR Belouizdad | Tlemcen |
| 16:45 | | Report | Selmi 63'; Belkhadem 90+1' | Stadium: Colonel Lotfi Stadium; Referee: Boubekeur Zouaoui |

== Squad information ==
=== Playing statistics ===
| No. | Pos | Nat | Player | Total | | Ligue 1 | |
| No. | Pos | Nat | Player | Apps | Goals | Apps | Goals |
Goalkeepers
| 1 | GK | (Algeria) ALG | Abdelwahab Saidi | 10 | 0 | 10 | 0 |
| 16 | GK | (Algeria) ALG | Mohamed Bouchaour | 15 | 0 | 15 | 0 |
| 27 | GK | (Algeria) ALG | Nafaa Aloui | 11 | 0 | 11 | 0 |
Defenders
| 2 | DF | (Algeria) ALG | Racim Mebarki | 8 | 0 | 8 | 0 |
| 3 | DF | (Algeria) ALG | Juba Chirani | 10 | 0 | 10 | 0 |
| 4 | DF | (Algeria) ALG | Soufyane Mebarki | 2 | 0 | 2 | 0 |
| 5 | DF | (Algeria) ALG | Youcef Kamel Messaoudi | 7 | 0 | 7 | 0 |
| 17 | DF | (Algeria) ALG | Houssam Bahraoui | 12 | 0 | 12 | 0 |
| 20 | DF | (Algeria) ALG | Abderrazzak Bentoucha | 5 | 0 | 5 | 0 |
| 35 | DF | (Algeria) ALG | Imad Eddine Ghemadi | 5 | 0 | 5 | 0 |
| | DF | (Algeria) ALG | Abderrazak Benamraoui | 21 | 1 | 21 | 1 |
Midfielders
| 6 | MF | (Algeria) ALG | Mohamed Heriat | 20 | 0 | 20 | 0 |
| 18 | MF | (Algeria) ALG | Djamel Belalem | 16 | 0 | 16 | 0 |
| 19 | MF | (Algeria) ALG | Charif Nasseri | 12 | 0 | 12 | 0 |
| 20 | MF | (Algeria) ALG | Redouane Bounoua | 31 | 3 | 31 | 3 |
| 23 | MF | (Algeria) ALG | Issam Abdelhafid Guendouze | 0 | 0 | 0 | 0 |
| 26 | MF | (Algeria) ALG | Houssem Ouassni | 20 | 1 | 20 | 1 |
| 31 | MF | (Algeria) ALG | Nassim Cherif | 12 | 0 | 12 | 0 |
| 34 | MF | (Algeria) ALG | Chems Eddine Lakehal | 24 | 1 | 24 | 1 |
Forwards
| 7 | FW | (Algeria) ALG | Abdelwahid Belgherbi | 14 | 1 | 14 | 1 |
| 9 | FW | (Algeria) ALG | Mohamed Seguer | 7 | 0 | 7 | 0 |
| 10 | FW | (Algeria) ALG | Mohamed Said Helal | 7 | 0 | 7 | 0 |
| 11 | FW | (Algeria) ALG | Aymen Amoura | 22 | 0 | 22 | 0 |
| 12 | FW | (Algeria) ALG | Karim Benhamida | 0 | 0 | 0 | 0 |
| 13 | FW | (Algeria) ALG | Mohamed Amine Semahi | 19 | 0 | 19 | 0 |
| 15 | FW | (Algeria) ALG | Sid Ali Mebarki | 16 | 2 | 16 | 2 |
| 21 | FW | (Algeria) ALG | Kouceila Kasdi | 22 | 0 | 22 | 0 |
| 24 | FW | (Algeria) ALG | Fathallah Belmokhtar | 17 | 0 | 17 | 0 |
| 25 | FW | (Algeria) ALG | Younes Anis Gali Zerargua | 8 | 2 | 8 | 2 |
| 46 | FW | (Algeria) ALG | Mortada Keniche | 26 | 1 | 26 | 1 |
| | FW | (Algeria) ALG | Ilyas Talbi | 1 | 1 | 1 | 1 |
Players transferred out during the season
| 14 | DF | (Algeria) ALG | Bilal Tizi Bouali | 5 | 0 | 5 | 0 |
| 8 | MF | (Algeria) ALG | Ahmida Zenasni | 15 | 0 | 15 | 0 |

Last updated: 10 June 2022
Source: soccerway.com

=== Goalscorers ===
As of 11 June 2022

Includes all competitive matches. The list is sorted alphabetically by surname when total goals are equal.

| No. | Nat. | Player | Pos. | L 1 | TOTAL |
|---|---|---|---|---|---|
| 20 | (Algeria) | Redouane Bounoua | MF | 3 | 3 |
| 15 | (Algeria) | Sid Ali Mebarki | FW | 2 | 2 |
| 25 | (Algeria) | Younes Anis Gali Zerargua | FW | 2 | 2 |
| 7 | (Algeria) | Abdelwahid Belgherbi | FW | 1 | 1 |
| 26 | (Algeria) | Houssem Ouassni | MF | 1 | 1 |
| 46 | (Algeria) | Mortada Keniche | FW | 1 | 1 |
| 34 | (Algeria) | Chems Eddine Lakehal | MF | 1 | 1 |
| | (Algeria) | Ilyas Talbi | FW | 1 | 1 |
| | (Algeria) | Abderrazak Benamraoui | DF | 1 | 1 |
| Own Goals | | | | 0 | 0 |
| Totals | | | | 13 | 13 |

== Transfers ==
=== In ===
| Date | Pos | Player | From club | Transfer fee | Source |
|---|---|---|---|---|---|
| 9 September 2021 | CB | (Algeria) Bilal Tizi Bouali | JS Kabylie | Free transfer | |
| 9 September 2021 | CB | (Algeria) Abderrazzak Bentoucha | MCB Oued Sly | Free transfer | |
| 9 September 2021 | FW | (Algeria) Amine Amoura | IRB Maghnia | Free transfer | |
| 11 September 2021 | FW | (Algeria) Houssam Bahraoui | JSM Skikda | Free transfer | |
| 12 September 2021 | FW | (Algeria) Fathallah Belmokhtar | ASB Maghnia | Free transfer | |
| 12 September 2021 | GK | (Algeria) Mohamed Bouchaour | RCB Oued Rhiou | Free transfer | |
| 18 September 2021 | GK | (Algeria) Nafaa Alloui | US Biskra | Free transfer | |
| 18 September 2021 | MF | (Algeria) Mohamed Heriat | AS Aïn M'lila | Free transfer | |
| 18 September 2021 | FW | (Algeria) Kouceila Kasdi | MO Bejaia | Free transfer | |
| 21 September 2021 | FW | (Algeria) Mohamed Ghali | MCB Oued Sly | Free transfer | |
| 21 September 2021 | RB | (Algeria) Racim Mebarki | JS Kabylie | Free transfer | |
| 21 September 2021 | LB | (Algeria) Juba Chirani | Paradou AC | Free transfer | |
| 26 September 2021 | MF | (Algeria) Charif Nasseri | JSM Skikda | Free transfer | |
| 29 September 2021 | FW | (Algeria) Abdelwahid Belgherbi | USM Bel Abbès | Free transfer | |
| 29 September 2021 | MF | (Algeria) Redouane Bounoua | USM Bel Abbès | Free transfer | |
| 14 October 2021 | FW | (Algeria) Mohamed Seguer | RC Relizane | Free transfer | |

=== Out ===
| Date | Pos | Player | To club | Transfer fee | Source |
|---|---|---|---|---|---|
| 16 August 2021 | RW | (Algeria) Oussama Bellatreche | JS Saoura | Free transfer | |
| 17 August 2021 | MF | (Algeria) Amine Benbelaid | ES Sétif | Free transfer | |
| 20 August 2021 | RB | (Algeria) Aymen Attou | MC Alger | Free transfer | |
| 2 September 2021 | ST | (Algeria) Lahouari Touil | (Iraq) Al-Zawraa SC | Free transfer | |
| 18 September 2021 | CB | (Algeria) Mohamed Oukrif | NC Magra | Free transfer | |
| 18 September 2021 | GK | (Algeria) Adel Chellali | NC Magra | Free transfer | |
| 26 September 2021 | RB | (Algeria) Kheireddine Benamrane | HB Chelghoum Laïd | Free transfer | |
| 7 October 2021 | FW | (Algeria) Mounir Aichi | RC Relizane | Free transfer | |
| 7 October 2021 | FW | (Algeria) Djamel Eddine Zermane | AS Aïn M'lila | Free transfer | |
| 25 February 2022 | DF | (Algeria) Ahmida Zenasni | ASO Chlef | Free transfer | |
