= 2021–22 ES Sétif season =

ES Sétif
2021–22 season
- President: Abdelhakim Serrar
- Head coach: Nabil Kouki (until 27 February 2022); Rédha Bendris (c) (from 2 March 2022) (until 19 April 2022); Darko Nović (from 19 April 2022)
- Stadium: Stade 8 Mai 1945
- Ligue 1: 7th
- Champions League: Semi-finals
- Top goalscorer: League: Riad Benayad (7 goals); All: Riad Benayad (7 goals)
Home colours	Away colours	Third colours

In the 2021–22 season, ES Sétif competed in the Ligue 1 for the 52nd season. It was their 26th consecutive season in the top flight of Algerian football. They competed in Ligue 1 and the Champions League.

== Squad list ==
Players and squad numbers last updated on 20 October 2021.
Note: Flags indicate national team as has been defined under FIFA eligibility rules. Players may hold more than one non-FIFA nationality.

No.	Nat.	Position	Name	Date of birth (age)	Signed from
Goalkeepers
1	(Algeria)	GK	Sofiane Khedairia	1 April 1989 (aged 32)	(Algeria) USM Bel Abbès
16	(Algeria)	GK	Zakaria Bouhalfaya	11 August 1997 (aged 24)	(Algeria) NC Magra
23	(Algeria)	GK	Mokhtar Ferrahi	24 January 1996 (aged 25)	(Algeria) Paradou AC
Defenders
3	(Algeria)	LB	Younes Abdelhak Ouassaa	4 July 1999 (aged 22)	(Algeria) RC Arbaâ
4	(Algeria)	CB	Amine Biaz	22 March 1999 (aged 22)	(Algeria) Youth system
5	(Algeria)	RB	Mohamed Khoutir Ziti	19 April 1989 (aged 32)	(Libya) Nasr Benghazi
8	(Algeria)	LB	Houari Ferhani	11 February 1993 (aged 28)	(Algeria) JS Kabylie
12	(Algeria)	RB	Mohamed Ali Larbi	2 October 1995 (aged 26)	(Algeria) ASM Oran
13	(Algeria)	RB	Abdelkrim Nemdil	3 October 1989 (aged 32)	(Algeria) USM El Harrach
18	(Algeria)	CB	Hocine Laribi	17 November 1991 (aged 30)	(Algeria) NA Hussein Dey
20	(Algeria)	RB	Abdelhak Debbari	6 January 1993 (aged 28)	(Algeria) MO Béjaïa
22	(Algeria)	LB	Belkacem Brahimi	20 January 1994 (aged 27)	(Algeria) MC Alger
26	(Algeria)	CB	Hichem Belkaroui	24 August 1990 (aged 31)	(Algeria) MC Oran
44	(Algeria)	CB	Ibrahim Hachoud	5 March 2000 (aged 21)	(Algeria) Youth system
Midfielders
6	(Algeria)	MF	Ahmed Kendouci	22 June 1999 (aged 22)	(Algeria) Youth system
7	(Algeria)	MF	Akram Djahnit	3 April 1991 (aged 30)	(Kuwait) Al-Arabi
10	(Algeria)	MF	Abdelmoumene Djabou	31 January 1987 (aged 34)	(Algeria) MC Alger
14	(Algeria)	MF	Amir Karaoui	3 August 1987 (aged 34)	(Algeria) MC Alger
15	(Algeria)	MF	Abderrahim Deghmoum	2 December 1998 (aged 23)	(Algeria) Youth system
19	(Algeria)	MF	Youcef Dali	26 February 1999 (aged 22)	(Algeria) Youth system
21	(Algeria)	MF	Amine Benbelaid	25 March 1992 (aged 29)	(Algeria) WA Tlemcen
25	(Algeria)	MF	Abdelkader Boutiche	26 October 1996 (aged 25)	(Algeria) MC Oran
27	(Algeria)	MF	Ibrahim Farhi Benhalima	16 April 1997 (aged 24)	(Tunisia) Club Africain
Forwards
9	(Algeria)	FW	Riad Benayad	2 November 1998 (aged 23)	(Algeria) Paradou AC
11	(Algeria)	FW	Zoubir Motrani	24 July 1995 (aged 25)	(Algeria) MC Oran
17	(Libya)	FW	Ibrahim Bodabous	3 August 1996 (aged 24)	(Libya) Al-Ahly SC
24	(Ghana)	FW	Daniel Lomotey	16 August 1999 (aged 21)	(Ghana) WAFA

== Pre-season and friendlies ==
3 October 2021 Friendly	AS Soukra	0–5	ES Sétif	Soukra
15:30			Darfalou 19' (pen.); Motrani 39'; Fellahi 46'; Djahnit 65'; Ziti 67'
Note: Lineup for ES Sétif; First half - Boudiaf, Belkaroui, Hachoud, Mohra, Ouassaa, Boutiche (Fellahi 34'), Farhi, Benbelaid, Motrani, Darfalou (Bakrar 34'), Bodbous. Second half - Boudiaf, Hachoud (Benayad 70'), Laribi, Nemdil, Ziti, Karaoui, Kendouci, Dali, Deghmoum, Djahnit, Lomotey.

6 October 2021 Friendly	ES Sétif	1–2	ES Métlaoui	Le Kram
12:00	Djahnit 62'			Stadium: Stade Beji Caid Essebsi
Note: Lineup for ES Sétif - Khedairia, Hachoud (Belkaroui 90'), Laribi, Nemdil, Ziti (Bakrar 80'), Karaoui, Dali (Boutiche 84'), Benbelaid (Fellahi 61'), Djahnit, Djabou (Mohra 80'), Lomotey.

9 October 2021 Friendly	ES Rades	0–3	ES Sétif	Radès
15:00			Ouassaa 3'; Belkaroui 19'; Farhi 38'	Stadium: Stade Hedi Ben Romdhane
Note: Lineup for ES Sétif - Ferrahi (Khedairia 46'), Belkaroui, Mohra, Ali Larbi (Dali 67'), Ouassaa (Nemdil 74'), Boutiche (Djahnit 74'), Farhi (Brahimi 50'), Fellahi (Benbelaid 63'), Bodbous (Djabou 63'), Motrani (Lomotey 67'), Bakrar (Darfalou 63').

13 October 2021 Friendly	ES Sétif	2–0	MO Constantine	Sétif
16:00	Bodbous 35', 69'			Stadium: Stade 8 Mai 1945
Note: Lineup for ES Sétif - Bouhalfaya, Belkaroui, Hachoud, Ali Larbi, Brahimi, Boutiche, Farhi, Fellahi (Ferhani 72'), Bodbous, Motrani, Lomotey (Darfalou 58').

== Competitions ==
=== Overview ===
Competition	Record								Started round	Final position / round	First match	Last match
Competition	G	W	D	L	GF	GA	GD	Win %	Started round	Final position / round	First match	Last match
Ligue 1	34	15	9	10	43	24	+19	44.12	—N/a	7th	2 November 2021	17 June 2022
Champions League	14	6	2	6	15	17	−2	42.86	First round	Semi-finals	11 September 2021	14 May 2022
Total	48	21	11	16	58	41	+17	43.75				

Updated to match played 17 June 2022
Source: Competitions

== League table ==
Pos	Team	Pld	W	D	L	GF	GA	GD	Pts
5	CS Constantine	34	15	10	9	46	29	+17	55
6	Paradou AC	34	16	6	12	43	36	+7	54 (Note: Paradou AC finished ahead of ES Sétif on head-to-head points: Paradou AC 1–0 ES Sétif, ES Sétif 0–1 Paradou AC.)
7	ES Sétif	34	15	9	10	43	24	+19	54
8	MC Alger	34	13	12	9	36	24	+12	51
9	ASO Chlef	34	13	11	10	38	31	+7	50 (Note: ASO Chlef finished ahead of US Biskra on head-to-head goal difference: US Biskra 2–1 ASO Chlef, ASO Chlef 2–0 US Biskra.)

Updated to match(es) played on 17 June 2022. Source: the-sports.org
Rules for classification: 1) points; 2) head-to-head points; 3) head-to-head goal difference; 4) goal difference; 5) total goals; 6) fairplay ranking; 7) playoff.

=== Results summary ===
Overall								Home						Away					
Pld	W	D	L	GF	GA	GD	Pts	W	D	L	GF	GA	GD	W	D	L	GF	GA	GD
34	15	9	10	43	24	+19	54	10	4	3	31	11	+20	5	5	7	12	13	−1

Last updated: 17 June 2022.
Source: Competitive matches

=== Results by round ===
Round	1	2	3	4	5	6	7	8	9	10	11	12	13	14	15	16	17	18	19	20	21	22	23	24	25	26	27	28	29	30	31	32	33	34
Ground	H	A	H	A	H	A	H	A	H	A	H	A	A	H	A	H	A	A	H	A	H	A	H	A	H	A	H	A	H	H	A	H	A	H
Result	W	D	D	D	D	W	W	L	W	L	W	W	D	W	D	W	L	L	D	W	L	L	L	W	W	L	L	W	W	W	L	D	D	W
Position	7	7	7	10	10	9	5	8	6	7	6	5	6	5	5	4	5	7	7	6	7	8	8	8	7	7	9	8	7	5	7	6	7	7

Updated to match(es) played on 17 June 2022. Source: Competitive matches
A = Away; H = Home; W = Win; D = Draw; L = Loss

=== Matches ===
The league fixtures were announced on 7 October 2021.

2 November 2021 Round 1	ES Sétif	1–0	HB Chelghoum Laïd	Sétif
15:00	Kendouci 90'	Report		Stadium: Stade 8 Mai 1945; Attendance: 0 (close doors); Referee: Riadh Ammar Khodja

29 October 2021 Round 2	JS Kabylie	0–0	ES Sétif	Tizi Ouzou
15:00		Report		Stadium: Stade 1er Novembre 1954; Attendance: 0 (Note: The match was played behind closed doors due to the COVID-19 pandemic in Algeria.); Referee: Mohamed Saïdi

7 November 2021 Round 3	ES Sétif	0–0	ASO Chlef	Sétif
14:30		Report		Stadium: Stade 8 Mai 1945; Attendance: 0 (close doors); Referee: Lotfi Bekouassa

19 November 2021 Round 4	MC Oran	0–0	ES Sétif	Oran
17:00		Report		Stadium: Ahmed Zabana Stadium; Referee: Lyés Bekouassa

25 November 2021 Round 5	ES Sétif	2–2	CR Belouizdad	Sétif
17:00	Deghmoum 54'; Bodabous 88' (pen.)	Report	Bakir 38'; Benhamou 42'	Stadium: Stade 8 Mai 1945; Attendance: 0 (close doors); Referee: Mustapha Ghorbal

4 December 2021 Round 6	NC Magra	0–2	ES Sétif	Magra
14:30		Report	Kendouci 70'; Motrani 75'	Stadium: Boucheligue Brothers Stadium; Referee: Mohamed Saïdi

11 December 2021 Round 7	ES Sétif	1–0	WA Tlemcen	Sétif
17:00	Kendouci 77'	Report		Stadium: Stade 8 Mai 1945; Attendance: 0 (close doors); Referee: Houssam Benyahia

17 December 2021 Round 8	MC Alger	2–0	ES Sétif	Algiers
18:00	Rebiai 54'; Frioui 87'	Report		Stadium: Stade du 5 Juillet; Attendance: 0 (close doors); Referee: Lahlou Benbraham

24 December 2021 Round 9	ES Sétif	1–0	CS Constantine	Sétif
16:00	Motrani 24'	Report		Stadium: Stade 8 Mai 1945; Attendance: 0 (close doors); Referee: Hamza Bouslimani

28 December 2021 Round 10	Paradou AC	1–0	ES Sétif	Dar El Beïda
14:30	Mouali 51'	Report		Stadium: Omar Benrabah Stadium; Attendance: 0 (close doors); Referee: Youcef Taieb Bouderbal

2 January 2022 Round 11	ES Sétif	3–0	Olympique de Médéa	Sétif
18:00	Benayad 53'; Djabou 76'; Debbari 89'	Report		Stadium: Stade 8 Mai 1945; Attendance: 0 (close doors); Referee: Abdelali Ibrir

8 January 2022 Round 12	RC Relizane	0–1	ES Sétif	Relizane
14:30	Bousseder (yellow card) 90+4'	Report	Ali Larbi (yellow card) 24'; Farhi 36'	Stadium: Tahar Zoughari Stadium; Referee: Mohamed Amine Benzohra

15 January 2022 Round 13	NA Hussein Dey	0–0	ES Sétif	Belouizdad
15:00		Report		Stadium: Stade 20 Août 1955; Referee: Ali Nader

21 January 2022 Round 14	ES Sétif	3–1	RC Arbaâ	Sétif
15:00	Ziti 24'; Bakrar 45+2'; Kendouci 70'	Report	Boubakour 49'	Stadium: Stade 8 Mai 1945; Attendance: 0 (close doors); Referee: Nadjib Meziani

25 January 2022 Round 15	JS Saoura	1–1	ES Sétif	Béchar
17:00	Hamidi 45+3' (pen.)	Report	Djahnit 44'	Stadium: Stade 20 Août 1955; Referee: Bilal Bendjahene

29 January 2022 Round 16	ES Sétif	2–0	US Biskra	Sétif
15:00	Lakhdari 12' (o.g.); Djahnit 34'	Report		Stadium: Stade 8 Mai 1945; Attendance: 0 (close doors); Referee: Abdellah Benchehida

7 February 2022 Round 17	USM Alger	1–0	ES Sétif	Bologhine
18:00	Mahious 16' (pen.)	Report		Stadium: Omar Hamadi Stadium; Attendance: 0 (close doors); Referee: Youcef Gamouh

2 March 2022 Round 19	ES Sétif	1–1	JS Kabylie	Sétif
18:00	Djahnit 27'	Report	Ouattara 34'	Stadium: Stade 8 Mai 1945; Attendance: 0 (close doors); Referee: Mehdi Abid Charef

6 March 2022 Round 20	ASO Chlef	0–1	ES Sétif	Chlef
17:00		Report	Laribi 13'	Stadium: Stade Mohamed Boumezrag; Referee: Lyés Bekouassa

22 March 2022 Round 18	HB Chelghoum Laïd	1–0	ES Sétif	Chelghoum Laïd
15:00	Haddad 83'	Report		Stadium: 11 December 1961 Stadium; Referee: Mohamed Boutaraa

26 March 2022 Round 23	ES Sétif	0–2	NC Magra	Sétif
15:00		Report	Demane 27' (pen.), 45+2'	Stadium: Stade 8 Mai 1945; Attendance: 0 (close doors); Referee: Lotfi Bekouassa

9 April 2022 Round 21	ES Sétif	0–1	MC Oran	Sétif
23:00		Report	Djabout 74'	Stadium: Stade 8 Mai 1945; Attendance: 0 (close doors); Referee: Hamza Bouslimani

12 April 2022 Round 25	ES Sétif	2–1	MC Alger	Sétif
22:00	Djahnit 1'; Ghezala 57' (o.g.)	Report	Abdelhafid 90+3'	Stadium: Stade 8 Mai 1945; Attendance: 0 (close doors); Referee: Akram Mechairia

29 April 2022 Round 28	Olympique de Médéa	1–4	ES Sétif	Médéa
16:45	Mokrani 46'	Report	Bakrar 15'; Motrani 28', 67'; Benayad 80' (pen.)	Stadium: Stade Imam Lyes; Referee: Mohamed Saïdi

10 May 2022 Round 29	ES Sétif	7–0	RC Relizane	Sétif
20:00	Djahnit 27' (pen.); Debbari 33'; Bakrar 36'; Motrani 61'; Benayad 71', 81'; Deghmoum 72'	Report		Stadium: Stade 8 Mai 1945; Referee: Mohamed Tahar Milia

18 May 2022 Round 22	CR Belouizdad	1–0	ES Sétif	Belouizdad
17:00	Bourdim 90+5'	Report		Stadium: Stade 20 Août 1955; Attendance: 0 (close doors); Referee: Mohamed Boutaraa

22 May 2022 Round 31	RC Arbaâ	3–1	ES Sétif	Larbaâ
16:00	Bouziane 23'; Oukil 45+1'; Boubakour 90+4'	Report	Kendouci 67'	Stadium: Ismaïl Makhlouf Stadium; Referee: Youcef Taieb Bouderbal

25 May 2022 Round 24	WA Tlemcen	0–1	ES Sétif	Tlemcen
16:00		Report	Benayad 38'	Stadium: Stade Akid Lotfi; Referee: Redouane Allou

29 May 2022 Round 32	ES Sétif	0–0	JS Saoura	Sétif
20:00		Report		Stadium: Stade 8 Mai 1945; Referee: Lyés Bekouassa

1 June 2022 Round 26	CS Constantine	1–0	ES Sétif	Constantine
16:45	Ardji 60'	Report		Stadium: Stade Ramdane Benabdelmalek; Referee: Abderrezzak Arab

5 June 2022 Round 33	US Biskra	1–1	ES Sétif	Biskra
19:00	Ounnas 16'	Report	Djahnit 8' (pen.)	Stadium: Stade du 18 Février; Referee: Hamza Boucetta

8 June 2022 Round 27	ES Sétif	0–1	Paradou AC	Sétif
18:45		Report	Boukerma 77'	Stadium: 8 May 1945 Stadium; Referee: Mohamed Saïdi

14 June 2022 Round 30	ES Sétif	5–1	NA Hussein Dey	Sétif
19:45	Bakrar 5', 58'; Nemdil 51' (pen.); Kendouci 53'; Darfalou 63'	Report	Akziz 78'	Stadium: 8 May 1945 Stadium; Referee: Said Aouina

17 June 2022 Round 34	ES Sétif	3–1	USM Alger	Sétif
18:00	Riad Benayad 4', 66'; Bakrar 44' (pen.); Benabed (yellow card) 62'	Report	Belharrane 27'; Azri (yellow card) 43'	Stadium: 8 May 1945 Stadium; Referee: Mohamed Saïdi

== Champions League ==
=== Qualifying rounds ===
==== First round ====
11 September 2021 First leg	Fortune FC (The Gambia)	3–0	(Algeria) ES Sétif	Bakau
16:00 UTC+0	Camara 22'; Sylva 59'; Barry 81'	Report		Stadium: Independence Stadium; Referee: Joel Wonka Doe (Liberia)

19 September 2021 Second leg	ES Sétif (Algeria)	3–0 (3–3 agg.) (5–4 p)	(The Gambia) Fortune FC	Sétif
21:00 UTC+1	Sawaneh 4' (o.g.); Benayad 20'; Djabou 67'	Report		Stadium: Stade 8 Mai 1945; Attendance: 0 (close doors); Referee: Mustapha Kechaf (Morocco)
	Penalties
	Djahnit (penalty scored); Karaoui (penalty scored); Deghmoum (penalty scored); Kendouci (penalty scored); Lomotey (penalty scored)		(penalty scored) Barry; (penalty scored) Jarju; (penalty scored) Sanyang; (penalty scored) Camara; (penalty missed) Darboe

==== Second round ====
17 October 2021 First leg	FC Nouadhibou (Mauritania)	3–1	(Algeria) ES Sétif	Nouakchott
14:00 UTC+0	Tanjy 54', 75'; Bessam 57'	Report	Deghmoum 41'	Stadium: Stade Olympique; Referee: Issa Sy (Senegal)

24 October 2021 Second leg	ES Sétif (Algeria)	2–0	(Mauritania) FC Nouadhibou	Sétif
18:00 UTC+1	Deghmoum 44'; Darfalou 84'	Report		Stadium: Stade 8 Mai 1945; Attendance: 0 (close doors); Referee: Boubou Traoré (Mali)

=== Group stage ===
==== Group B ====
Pos	Team	Pld	W	D	L	GF	GA	GD	Pts	Qualification	RCA	ESS	AMZ	HOR
1	(Morocco) Raja CA	6	5	0	1	7	2	+5	15	Advance to knockout stage	—	1–0	1–0	1–0
2	(Algeria) ES Sétif	6	3	0	3	6	5	+1	9	Advance to knockout stage	0–1	—	2–0	3–2
3	(South Africa) AmaZulu	6	2	1	3	3	6	−3	7		0–2	1–0	—	1–0
4	(Guinea) Horoya	6	1	1	4	5	8	−3	4		2–1	0–1	1–1	—

Source: CAF

12 February 2022 Matchday 1	Horoya (Guinea)	0–1	(Algeria) ES Sétif	Conakry
16:00 UTC+0		Report	Kendouci 47'	Stadium: General Lansana Conté Stadium; Referee: Pacifique Ndabihawenimana (Burundi)

18 February 2022 Matchday 2	ES Sétif (Algeria)	0–1	(Morocco) Raja Casablanca	Algiers (Note: ES Sétif play their group stage home matches at Stade du 5 Juillet, Algiers, instead of their regular home stadium Stade 8 Mai 1945, Sétif, which did not meet CAF requirements.)
20:00 UTC+1		Report	Zrida 71'	Stadium: Stade du 5 Juillet; Attendance: 0 (close doors); Referee: Maguette Ndiaye (Senegal)

25 February 2022 Matchday 3	AmaZulu (South Africa)	1–0	(Algeria) ES Sétif	Durban
18:00 UTC+2	Memela 42'	Report		Stadium: Moses Mabhida Stadium; Referee: Peter Waweru (Kenya)

12 March 2022 Matchday 4	ES Sétif (Algeria)	2–0	(South Africa) AmaZulu	Algiers
20:00 UTC+1	Benayad 11'; Djahnit 45+1'	Report		Stadium: Stade du 5 Juillet; Attendance: 0 (close doors); Referee: Haythem Guirat (Tunisia)

18 March 2022 Matchday 5	ES Sétif (Algeria)	3–2	(Guinea) Horoya	Algiers
20:00 UTC+1	Djahnit 47'; Benayad 87', 90+3'	Report	Baffour 25'; Sylla 59'	Stadium: Stade du 5 Juillet; Attendance: 0 (close doors); Referee: Youssef Sraïri (Tunisia)

3 April 2022 Matchday 6	Raja Casablanca (Morocco)	1–0	(Algeria) ES Sétif	Casablanca
21:00 UTC+0	Hadhoudi 74'	Report		Stadium: Stade Mohammed V Referee: Amin Omar (Egypt)

=== Knockout stage ===
==== Quarter-finals ====
15 April 2022 First leg	ES Sétif (Algeria)	0–0	(Tunisia) Espérance de Tunis	Algiers
22:00 UTC+1		Report		Stadium: Stade du 5 Juillet; Referee: Victor Gomes (South Africa)

22 April 2022 Second leg	Espérance de Tunis (Tunisia)	0–1 (0–1 agg.)	(Algeria) ES Sétif	Tunis
22:00 UTC+1		Report	Djabou 21'	Stadium: Stade Hammadi Agrebi; Attendance: 0 (close doors); Referee: Redouane Jiyed (Morocco)

==== Semi-finals ====
7 May 2022 First leg	Al Ahly (Egypt)	4–0	(Algeria) ES Sétif	Cairo
21:00 UTC+2	Tau 30', 90'; Mohamed 54'; Sherif 72'	Report		Stadium: Al Ahly WE Al Salam Stadium; Referee: Bamlak Tessema Weyesa (Ethiopia)

14 May 2022 Second leg	ES Sétif (Algeria)	2–2	(Egypt) Al Ahly	Algiers
20:00 UTC+1	Kendouci 45'; Benayad 61'	Report	Abdel Kader 2'; Sherif 90+2'	Stadium: Stade du 5 Juillet; Referee: Sadok Selmi (Tunisia)

== Squad information ==
=== Playing statistics ===
No.	Pos	Player	Nat	Ligue 1			Champions League			Total		
No.	Pos	Player	Nat	App	St	G	App	St	G	App	St	G
Goalkeepers
1	GK	Sofiane Khedairia	(Algeria)	12	12	0	11	11	0	23	23	0
16	GK	Zakaria Bouhalfaya	(Algeria)	18	18	0	3	3	0	21	21	0
23	GK	Mokhtar Ferrahi	(Algeria)	4	4	0	0	0	0	4	0	0
Defenders
3	LB	Younes Ouassaa	(Algeria)	1	0	0	2	0	0	3	0	0
4	CB	Amine Biaz	(Algeria)	2	1	0	0	0	0	2	0	0
5	RB	Mohamed Khoutir Ziti	(Algeria)	16	11	1	8	6	0	24	17	1
8	LB	Houari Ferhani	(Algeria)	21	13	0	9	9	0	30	22	0
12	RB	Mohamed El Amine Ali Larbi	(Algeria)	19	6	0	0	0	0	19	6	0
13	RB	Abdelkrim Nemdil	(Algeria)	28	25	1	13	9	0	41	34	1
18	CB	Hocine Laribi	(Algeria)	17	17	1	10	10	0	27	27	1
22	LB	Belkacem Brahimi	(Algeria)	21	20	0	2	1	0	23	21	0
20	RB	Abdelhak Debbari	(Algeria)	18	18	2	12	9	0	30	27	2
26	CB	Hichem Belkaroui	(Algeria)	22	20	0	9	9	0	31	29	0
33	DF	Abderrazak Mohra	(Algeria)	0	0	0	1	1	0	1	1	0
44	CB	Ibrahim Hachoud	(Algeria)	7	3	0	3	1	0	10	4	0
Midfielders
6	MF	Ahmed Kendouci	(Algeria)	29	25	6	14	14	2	43	39	8
7	MF	Akram Djahnit	(Algeria)	25	22	5	13	13	2	38	35	7
10	MF	Abdelmoumene Djabou	(Algeria)	16	12	1	10	2	2	26	14	3
14	MF	Amir Karaoui	(Algeria)	30	27	1	12	11	0	42	38	1
19	MF	Youcef Dali	(Algeria)	6	2	0	2	0	0	8	2	0
21	MF	Amine Benbelaid	(Algeria)	9	0	0	2	1	0	11	1	0
25	MF	Abdelkader Boutiche	(Algeria)	26	21	0	10	9	0	36	30	0
27	MF	Ibrahim Farhi	(Algeria)	17	11	1	6	0	0	23	11	1
Forwards
9	FW	Riad Benayad	(Algeria)	20	15	7	11	9	5	31	24	12
11	FW	Zoubir Motrani	(Algeria)	20	16	5	8	3	0	28	19	5
15	FW	Abderrahim Deghmoum	(Algeria)	27	24	2	12	10	2	39	34	4
17	FW	Ibrahim Bodabous	(Libya)	21	5	1	6	3	0	27	8	1
24	FW	Daniel Lomotey	(Ghana)	0	0	0	3	1	0	3	1	0
31	FW	Youcef Fellahi	(Algeria)	10	2	0	0	0	0	10	2	0
32	FW	Monsef Bakrar	(Algeria)	21	11	6	9	3	0	30	14	6
34	FW	Khalil Darfalou	(Algeria)	13	2	1	5	0	1	18	2	2
Total				34		43	14		15	48		58

=== Goalscorers ===
Includes all competitive matches. The list is sorted alphabetically by surname when total goals are equal.

No.	Nat.	Player	Pos.	L 1	CL 1	TOTAL
7	(Algeria)	Akram Djahnit	MF	4	2	6
9	(Algeria)	Riad Benayad	FW	1	4	5
6	(Algeria)	Ahmed Kendouci	MF	4	1	5
10	(Algeria)	Abdelmoumene Djabou	MF	1	2	3
15	(Algeria)	Abderrahim Deghmoum	MF	1	2	3
17	(Libya)	Ibrahim Bodabous	FW	1	0	1
11	(Algeria)	Zoubir Motrani	FW	2	0	2
20	(Algeria)	Abdelhak Debbari	DF	1	0	1
27	(Algeria)	Ibrahim Farhi Benhalima	MF	1	0	1
5	(Algeria)	Mohamed Khoutir Ziti	DF	1	0	1
12	(Algeria)	Mohamed Ali Larbi	DF	1	0	1
32	(Algeria)	Monsef Bakrar	FW	1	0	1
34	(Algeria)	Khalil Darfalou	FW	0	1	1
Own Goals				2	1	3
Totals				21	13	34

== Transfers ==
=== In ===
Date	Pos	Player	From club	Transfer fee	Source
13 August 2021	LB	(Algeria) Younes Ouassaa	RC Arbaâ	Free transfer	
17 August 2021	MF	(Algeria) Amine Benbelaid	WA Tlemcen	Free transfer	
24 August 2021	MF	(Algeria) Ibrahim Farhi Benhalima	Club Africain	Free transfer	
24 August 2021	MF	(Libya) Ibrahim Bodbous	(Libya) Al-Ahly SC	Free transfer	
24 August 2021	MF	(Algeria) Riad Benayad	Paradou AC	Loan for one year	
24 August 2021	AM	(Algeria) Djamil Benabed	MC Oran	Free transfer	
29 August 2021	RB	(Algeria) Mohamed Amine Ali Larbi	ASM Oran	Free transfer	
2 September 2021	MF	(Algeria) Abdelkader Boutiche	MC Oran	Free transfer	
2 September 2021	FW	(Algeria) Zoubir Motrani	MC Oran	Free transfer	
7 September 2021	CB	(Algeria) Hicham Belkaroui	MC Oran	Free transfer	
7 September 2021	GK	(Algeria) Zakaria Bouhalfaya	NC Magra	Undisclosed	
21 September 2021	RB	(Algeria) Mohamed Ali Larbi	ASM Oran	Free transfer	
26 September 2021	LB	(Algeria) Belkacem Brahimi	MC Alger	Free transfer	
29 September 2021	GK	(Algeria) Mokhtar Ferrahi	Paradou AC	Free transfer	

=== Out ===
Date	Pos	Player	To club	Transfer fee	Source
16 July 2021	FW	(Algeria) Houssam Ghacha	(Turkey) Antalyaspor	Free transfer	
1 August 2021	DF	(Algeria) Youcef Laouafi	(Tunisia) Étoile du Sahel	Free transfer	
15 August 2021	LW	(Algeria) Ismaïl Saâdi	JS Saoura	Free transfer	
18 August 2021	MF	(Algeria) Messala Merbah	USM Alger	Free transfer	
19 August 2021	DF	(Algeria) Ibrahim Bekakchi	USM Alger	Free transfer	
26 August 2021	LW	(Algeria) Mohamed El Amine Amoura	(Switzerland) FC Lugano	1,200,000 €	
14 September 2021	MF	(Algeria) Mohamed Djahli	Olympique de Médéa	Free transfer	
16 September 2021	FW	(Algeria) Yasser Berbache	Olympique de Médéa	Free transfer	
16 September 2021	GK	(Algeria) Said Daas	Olympique de Médéa	Free transfer	
23 September 2021	RB	(Algeria) Amir Laidouni	Olympique de Médéa	Free transfer	
5 October 2021	FW	(Algeria) Khier-Anes Belaïd	Olympique de Médéa	Free transfer	
8 October 2021	GK	(Algeria) Khairi Barki	AS Aïn M'lila	Free transfer	
7 October 2021	LB	(Algeria) Nasreddine Benlebna	RC Relizane	Free transfer	

== New contracts ==
No.	Pos	Player	Contract length	Contract end	Date	Source
1	GK	(Algeria) Sofiane Khedairia	1 years	2023	5 August 2021	
20	RB	(Algeria) Abdelhak Debbari	2 years	2023	15 August 2021	
13	RB	(Algeria) Abdelkrim Nemdil	2 years	2023	15 August 2021	
18	CB	(Algeria) Hocine Laribi	2 years	2023	15 August 2021	
7	AM	(Algeria) Akram Djahnit	3 years	2024	15 August 2021	
5	RB	(Algeria) Mohamed Khoutir Ziti	2 years	2024	23 August 2021	
44	CB	(Algeria) Ibrahim Hachoud	2 years	2024	23 August 2021	
72	FW	(Algeria) Khalil Darfalou	2 years	2024	23 August 2021	
19	MF	(Algeria) Youcef Dali	2 years	2024	23 August 2021	
