= Khalil Darfalou =

Algerian footballer (born 2001)

Personal information
- Date of birth: 21 June 2001 (age 25)
- Place of birth: Aïn El Hadjel, Algeria
- Height: 1.81 m (5 ft 11 in)
- Position: Striker

Youth career
- –2020: ES Sétif

Senior career*
Years	Team	Apps	(Gls)
2020–2022	ES Sétif	17	(1)
2022–2023	USM Alger	0	(0)
2023–2024	US Biskra	8	(0)
- * Club domestic league appearances and goals as of 14 June 2024

Khalil Darfalou (Arabic: خليل درفلو; born 21 May 2001) is an Algerian professional footballer.

== Career ==
On July 27, 2022, Khalil Darfalou signed a two-year contract with USM Alger.

17 August 2023, Darfalou joined US Biskra.

== Career statistics ==
=== Club ===
As of 17 June 2022

Club	Season	League			Cup		Continental		Other		Total	
Club	Season	Division	Apps	Goals	Apps	Goals	Apps	Goals	Apps	Goals	Apps	Goals
ES Sétif	2020–21	Ligue 1	4	0	—		—		—		4	0
ES Sétif	2021–22	Ligue 1	13	1	—		5 (Note: All appearance(s) in Champions League)	1	—		18	2
ES Sétif	Total		17	1	—		5	1	—		22	2
USM Alger	2022–23	Ligue 1	0	0	0	0	0 (Note: All appearance(s) in CAF Confederation Cup)	0	—		0	0
Career total			17	1	0	0	5	1	—		22	2
