= Youcef Bouzidi =

Algerian football manager (1957–2024)

Personal information
- Date of birth: 19 July 1957
- Place of birth: Hussein Dey, French Algeria
- Date of death: 12 December 2024 (aged 67)

Managerial career
- Years: Team
- 2003: CA Bordj Bou Arréridj (assistant)
- 2012: JSM Skikda
- 2012–2013: NA Hussein Dey
- 2014–2015: NA Hussein Dey (assistant)
- 2015: NA Hussein Dey
- 2015: Olympique Médéa
- 2015–2016: NA Hussein Dey
- 2016–2017: MO Béjaïa
- 2017: ASO Chlef
- 2017: RC Relizane
- 2017–2018: JSM Skikda
- 2018: JS Kabylie
- 2018–2019: USM Bel Abbès
- 2019: MO Béjaïa
- 2020: RC Relizane
- 2020–2021: JS Kabylie
- 2021–2022: US Biskra
- 2022: US Biskra
- 2023: JS Kabylie
- 2024: MC Oran

Youcef Bouzidi (Arabic: يوسف بوزيدي; Tamazight: ⵢⵓⵙⵙⴻⴼ ⴱⵓⵣⵉⴷⵉ; 19 July 1957 – 12 December 2024) was an Algerian football manager. He died on 12 December 2024, at the age of 67.
