= Azzedine Aït Djoudi =

Algerian footballer and manager (born 1967)

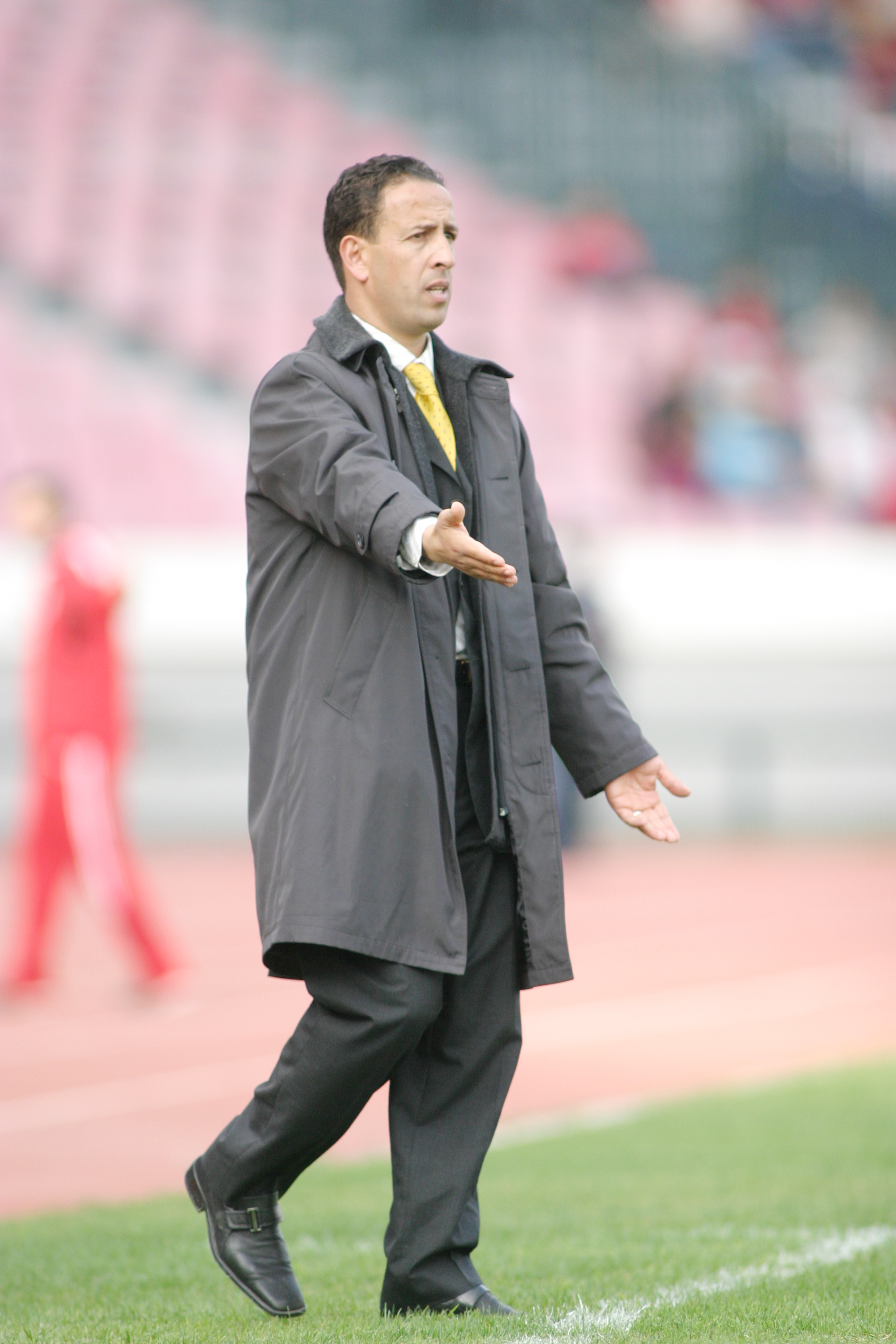

Personal information
- Full name: Azzedine Aït Djoudi
- Date of birth: January 24, 1967 (age 59)
- Place of birth: Tébessa, Algeria
- Position: Midfielder

Team information
- Current team: Paradou AC (head coach)

Senior career*
Years	Team	Apps	(Gls)
1977–1987	JS Kabylie		
1987–1989	Hydra AC		
1989–1991	ES Ben Aknoun		

Managerial career
- 1998–1999: Olympique de Médéa
- 2000–2001: USM El Harrach
- 2001: Algeria (assistant)
- 2001–2002: USM Annaba
- 2002–2003: USM Alger
- 2003–2004: JS Kabylie
- 2004–2005: MC Oujda
- 2005: CA Bordj Bou Arreridj
- 2006: CR Belouizdad
- 2006–2007: JS Kabylie
- 2007–2008: HUS d'Agadir
- 2008–2009: ES Sétif
- 2009: CS Sfaxien
- 2009: ES Zarzis
- 2010: AS Khroub
- 2010–2011: Algeria U23
- 2012: AS Khroub
- 2012–2013: Maghreb de Fès
- 2013–2014: JS Kabylie
- 2014: NA Hussein Dey
- 2014–2015: MC El Eulma
- 2015–2017: MC Oujda
- 2017: Olympique Club de Khouribga
- 2017–2018: JS Kabylie
- 2018: MO Béjaïa
- 2019: AS Aïn M'lila
- 2020: NA Hussein Dey
- 2021: US Biskra
- 2021: MC Oran
- 2023: NC Magra
- 2023: JSM Tiaret
- 2024: JS Kabylie
- 2025: NC Magra
- 2025: USM El Harrach
- 2026–: Paradou AC
- * Club domestic league appearances and goals

Azzedine Aït Djoudi (Arabic: عز الدين آيت جودي; born January 24, 1967) is an Algerian football manager.

== Managerial career ==
From a young age (10 years), he began a football career at JS Kabylie in which he moved up the levels to reach the status of the ISTS professionnel. Diplômé opted for an early coaching career at the age 24 years at Sidi Aich SS, ESM Boudouaou, JS Bordj Menaiel, USM El Harrach, JSM Bejaia, MSP Batna which has been fairly successful, since he won the trust of several major Algerian club USM Alger, JS Kabylie, CR Belouizdad, ES Setif. He was then recruited by CS Sfaxien, to a friendly separation with the club in late September 2009. In early October 2009, he was appointed as coach of the Hope sports Zarzis. In January 2010, he returned to the country to train Khroub> He has worked in national team in 2001 as an assistant to Abdelhamid Kermali in a duo with Abdelhamid Zouba.

=== ES Sétif ===
Aït Djoudi, In September 2008, was contacted by President Serrar to make the team in hand with that has won over 35 games and finished champions Algeria and semifinalist cutting Arabic Écouter Lire phonétiquement

=== CS Sfaxien ===
June 2009 was contacted by the club president with Moncef Sellami who met in Paris to conclude until late September was an amicable separation was made.

=== Algeria Under 23s ===
On September 13, 2010, Aït Djoudi was appointed as manager of the Algeria national under-23 football team. He signed a two-year contract with the Algerian Football Federation, with his main objective being to qualify the team for the 2012 Summer Olympics in London. Under his guidance, he led the team to the 2010 UNAF U-23 Tournament title in Morocco with 3 wins in 3 games. He then qualified the team to the 2011 CAF U-23 Championship, beating Madagascar and Zambia in the qualifiers.

== Honours ==
=== Algerian Ligue Professionnelle 1 (3) ===
- Winner: 2003 USM Alger
- Winner: 2004 JS Kabylie
- Winner: 2009 ES Setif

=== Algerian Cup (3) ===
- Winner: 2003 USM Alger
- Finalist: 2004 JS Kabylie
- Finalist: 2014 JS Kabylie
