= Denis Lavagne =

French footballer and manager (born 1964)

Personal information
- Date of birth: 9 July 1964 (age 62)
- Place of birth: Béziers, France
- Height: 1.80 m (5 ft 11 in)
- Position: Defender

Senior career*
Years	Team	Apps	(Gls)
1981–1982	Le Havre B		
1982–1983	Rouen B		
1983–1984	Béziers		
1984–1985	Alès		
1985–1987	Orange		
1987–1989	Alès B		

Managerial career
- 1998–1999: Béziers Deveze
- 1999–2003: Sedan B
- 2007–2008: Coton Sport
- 2009–2011: Coton Sport
- 2011–2012: Cameroon
- 2013: Étoile du Sahel
- 2013–2014: Al Ittihad Alexandria
- 2014: Najran
- 2014–2015: Smouha
- 2015–2016: MAS Fez
- 2016: Free State Stars
- 2016–2017: Al-Hilal
- 2018–2019: CS Constantine
- 2021: JS Kabylie
- 2021: USM Alger
- 2022: Azam
- 2023–2024: Al-Jabalain
- 2024: Al-Bukiryah
- * Club domestic league appearances and goals

Denis Lavagne (born 9 July 1964) is a French football coach and former player.

== Playing career ==
Born in Béziers, Lavagne played for Le Havre B, Rouen B, Béziers, Alès, Orange and Alès B.

== Coaching career ==
After retiring from playing in 1989, Lavagne worked as an assistant manager with Alès, Nîmes, Bastia and ASOA Valence. He then worked as manager of Béziers Deveze between 1998 and 1999, before becoming a coach at Sedan and manager of Sedan B. He left Sedan in 2003, and spent time coaching in Qatar (with Qatar SC) and in China (with Chengdu Blades). He had two spells as manager of Coton Sport, separated by coaching with Moroccan club Difaâ Hassani El Jadidi.

Lavagne left his job as manager of Coton Sport to become manager of the Cameroon national team in October 2011. He was dismissed from this position in September 2012 following poor results. He then became manager of Tunisian club Étoile du Sahel in March 2013, and also later managed Egyptian club Al Ittihad and Saudi club Najran. He took over as manager of Egyptian club Smouha in October 2014, before being sacked in January 2015. After managing Moroccan club MAS Fez, he took over as manager of South African club Free State Stars in June 2016. He was sacked by the club in September 2016.

After managing Sudanese club Al-Hilal and a spell as a coach at French club Le Havre, in December 2018 he became manager of Algerian club CS Constantine.

In January 2021 he became manager of Algerian club JS Kabylie. He left the club in August 2021, and later that month became manager of USM Alger. In December 2021, he was sacked from USM Alger.

In September 2022 he became manager of Tanzanian club Azam.

On 18 January 2023, Lavagne was appointed as manager of Saudi Arabian club Al-Jabalain.

On 11 July 2024, Lavagne was appointed as manager of Al-Bukiryah.
