= Abdelaziz Abbès =

Algerian football manager

Personal information
- Date of birth: 7 October 1963 (age 63)

Managerial career
- Years: Team
- 2012–2013: CA Bordj Bou Arréridj
- 2013–2014: CRB Aïn Fakroun
- 2014–2015: CA Batna
- 2015: CRB Aïn Fakroun
- 2017: MC El Eulma
- 2017: CA Batna
- 2018: USM El Harrach
- 2018–2029: NC Magra
- 2019–2021: WA Tlemcen
- 2021: NC Magra
- 2022: HB Chelghoum Laïd
- 2023: NC Magra

Abdelaziz Abbès (Arabic: عزيز عباس; born 7 October 1963) is an Algerian football manager. Since 2012, he has worked in teams like CA Bordj Bou Arréridj, CRB Aïn Fakroun, CA Batna, MC El Eulma, USM El Harrach, NC Magra and WA Tlemcen.
