= Henri Stambouli =

Algerian footballer and manager (1961–2023)

Personal information
- Date of birth: 5 August 1961
- Place of birth: Oran, French Algeria
- Date of death: 17 November 2023 (aged 62)
- Place of death: Dakar, Senegal
- Height: 1.80 m (5 ft 11 in)
- Position: Goalkeeper

Senior career*
Years	Team	Apps	(Gls)
1975–1977	Rodez		
1977–1986	Monaco		
1986–1989	Marseille	2	(0)

Managerial career
- 1994–1995: Marseille
- 1998–1999: Guinea
- 2000–2001: Sion
- 2001–2003: Sedan
- 2003–2004: Mali
- 2004: Las Palmas
- 2004: Club Africain
- 2004–2005: Raja Casablanca
- 2005–2006: Sharjah
- 2006: Al Jazira
- 2006–2007: FAR Rabat
- 2008: Togo
- 2008–2010: Istres
- 2021: JS Kabylie
- * Club domestic league appearances and goals

Henri Stambouli (5 August 1961 – 17 November 2023) was a French football player and manager.

== Coaching career ==
Stambouli coached Marseille and Sedan in France.

Stambouli managed the Togo national team, leaving the position in September 2008.

== Personal life and death ==
Henri Stambouli died on 17 November 2023, at the age of 62. He was the father of midfielder Benjamin Stambouli.
