= Kais Yaâkoubi =

Tunisian footballer

Personal information
- Date of birth: 18 July 1966 (age 60)
- Place of birth: Le Kram, Tunisia
- Position: Forward

Youth career
- Club Africain

Senior career*
Years	Team	Apps	(Gls)
- Club Africain

International career
1987–1990	Tunisia	14	(2)

Managerial career
- 2006–2007: EOG Kram
- 2007: US Monastir
- 2007–2008: AS Marsa
- 2008: Stade Gabèsien
- 2009–2010: Al-Shoulla
- 2010: ES Beni-Khalled
- 2010–2011: Club Africain
- 2015–2016: EGS Gafsa
- 2016: Club Africain
- 2016–2017: Al-Wakrah
- 2017: Al-Arabi
- 2018–2019: Al-Wehdat
- 2019–2020: Al-Ittihad Aleppo
- 2021–2022: JS Saoura
- 2023: ASO Chlef
- 2024: ES Metlaoui
- 2024–2025: Tunisia (Assistant manager)
- 2024: Tunisia (Manager)
- 2024-25: Al-Wehdat SC
- * Club domestic league appearances and goals

Kais Yaâkoubi, also written Kais Yakoubi (Arabic: قيس اليعقوبي; born 18 July 1966) is a Tunisian football manager and former player.

He was capped 14 times for the Tunisia national team, scoring two goals. He was also a member of the national squad for the 1988 Olympics.

== Honours ==
Club Africain

- Tunisian Ligue Professionnelle 1: 1989–90
