= Karim Zaoui =

Algerian football manager

Personal information
- Date of birth: 7 January 1970 (age 56)

Team information
- Current team: Olympique de Médéa (head coach)

Managerial career
- Years: Team
- 2010: NA Hussein Dey
- 2018–2019: JS Saoura (assistant)
- 2019: JS Saoura
- 2019: NC Magra
- 2021: NA Hussein Dey
- 2022–: Olympique de Médéa

Karim Zaoui (born 7 January 1970) is an Algerian football manager and the current head coach of Olympique de Médéa.
