= Kamel Bouhellal =

Algerian football manager

Personal information
- Full name: Kamel Eddine Bouhellal
- Date of birth: 24 June 1966 (age 60)

Managerial career
- Years: Team
- 2003–2010: Paradou AC
- 2010–2011: JS Kabylie (assistant)
- 2011: RC Kouba
- 2011–2012: MC Alger (assistant)
- 2012: MC Alger
- 2016: MC El Eulma
- 2018: USM Blida
- 2018: DRB Tadjenanet
- 2019–2021: RC Arbaâ
- 2021: WA Tlemcen

Kamel Bouhellal (born 24 June 1966) is an Algerian football manager.
