= Sid-Ahmed Slimani =

Algerian football manager

Personal information
- Date of birth: 4 November 1958 (age 67)
- Place of birth: Tlemcen, Algeria

Team information
- Current team: WA Tlemcen (head coach)

Managerial career
- Years: Team
- 2002–2003: ASO Chlef
- 2003–2004: USM Annaba
- 2004–2005: CS Constantine
- 2006: US Biskra
- 2006: MO Béjaïa
- 2006–2007: ASM Oran
- 2007: WA Tlemcen
- 2007: USM Annaba
- 2009–2010: ASO Chlef
- 2011: MC Oran
- 2011–2012: AB Mérouana
- 2013: MC Oran
- 2015–2018: Olympique de Médéa
- 2018: RC Kouba
- 2018–2019: ASM Oran
- 2019: USM Bel Abbès
- 2019–2020: USM El Harrach
- 2020–2021: SKAF Khemis Miliana
- 2021–2022: USM Bel Abbès
- 2022–: WA Tlemcen

Sid-Ahmed Slimani (born 4 November 1958) is an Algerian football manager and the current head coach of WA Tlemcen.
