= List of Algerian football transfers summer 2020 =

This is a list of Algerian football transfers in the 2020 summer transfer window by club. Clubs in the 2020–21 Algerian Ligue Professionnelle 1 are included.

== Ligue Professionnelle 1 ==
=== AS Ain M'lila ===
In: Note: Flags indicate national team as defined under FIFA eligibility rules; some limited exceptions apply. Players may hold more than one non-FIFA nationality.

| No. | Pos. | Nation | Player |
|---|---|---|---|
| — | DF | ALG | Amir Bellaili (from (Algeria) JS Kabylie) |

Out: Note: Flags indicate national team as defined under FIFA eligibility rules; some limited exceptions apply. Players may hold more than one non-FIFA nationality.

| No. | Pos. | Nation | Player |
|---|---|---|---|
| — | FW | ALG | Brahim Dib (to (Algeria) CS Constantine) |
| — | GK | ALG | Omar Hadji (to (Algeria) Paradou AC) |
| — | DF | ALG | Mohamed Guemroud (to (Algeria) CS Constantine) |
| — | FW | ALG | Mohamed Taib (to (Algeria) Olympique de Médéa) |

=== ASO Chlef ===
In: Note: Flags indicate national team as defined under FIFA eligibility rules; some limited exceptions apply. Players may hold more than one non-FIFA nationality.

| No. | Pos. | Nation | Player |
|---|---|---|---|
| — | DF | ALG | Houssem Meharzi (from (Algeria) AS Khroub) |
| — | MF | ALG | Abdellah Meddah (from (Algeria) US Beni Douala) |
| — | DF | ALG | Mohamed Sabri Benbrahim (from (Tunisia) US Tataouine) |
| — | DF | ALG | Abderrahmane Nehari (from (Algeria) OM Arzew) |
| — | MF | ALG | Mustapha Zeghnoun (from (Algeria) JSM Skikda) |
| — | FW | ALG | Ameur Bouguettaya (from (Algeria) USM Bel Abbès) |
| — | MF | ALG | Khathir Baaziz (from (Algeria) MC El Eulma) |

Out: Note: Flags indicate national team as defined under FIFA eligibility rules; some limited exceptions apply. Players may hold more than one non-FIFA nationality.

| No. | Pos. | Nation | Player |
|---|---|---|---|
| — | FW | ALG | Said Hadji Habib (to (Algeria) JS Kabylie) |
| — | MF | ALG | Abdelkader Boussaid (to (Algeria) JSM Skikda) |
| — | FW | ALG | Abdelkader Kaibou (to (Algeria) JSM Skikda) |
| — | FW | ALG | Chaker Kaddour Chérif (to (Algeria) JS Kabylie) |

=== CA Bordj Bou Arreridj ===
In: Note: Flags indicate national team as defined under FIFA eligibility rules; some limited exceptions apply. Players may hold more than one non-FIFA nationality.

| No. | Pos. | Nation | Player |
|---|---|---|---|
| — | MF | ALG | Salaheddine Rahba (from (Algeria) ES Sétif) |
| — | DF | ALG | Toufik Zeghdane (from (Algeria) JS Kabylie) |
| — | MF | ALG | Bassem Nedjmeddine Charama (from (Algeria) ES Sétif) |
| — | FW | ALG | Mansour Benothmane (from (Algeria) ASO Chlef) |
| — | DF | ALG | Takfarinas Ouchène (from (Algeria) RC Relizane) |

Out: Note: Flags indicate national team as defined under FIFA eligibility rules; some limited exceptions apply. Players may hold more than one non-FIFA nationality.

| No. | Pos. | Nation | Player |
|---|---|---|---|
| — | MF | CIV | Isla Daoudi Diomande (to (Algeria) MC Alger) |
| — | FW | ALG | Mehdi Derrouache (to (Algeria) JS Saoura) |
| — | DF | ALG | Mohamed Amrane (to (Algeria) JS Saoura) |
| — | MF | ALG | Mohamed El Amine Belmokhtar (to (Algeria) USM Bel Abbès) |
| — | FW | ALG | Tawfiq Elghomari (to (Algeria) Olympique de Médéa) |
| — | FW | SDN | Mohamed Abderrahmane Al Ghorbal (to (Sudan) Al-Hilal Club) |

=== CR Belouizdad ===
In: Note: Flags indicate national team as defined under FIFA eligibility rules; some limited exceptions apply. Players may hold more than one non-FIFA nationality.

| No. | Pos. | Nation | Player |
|---|---|---|---|
| — | MF | ALG | Zakaria Draoui (from (Algeria) ES Sétif) |
| — | DF | ALG | Mokhtar Belkhiter (from (Tunisia) Club Africain) |
| — | FW | BEL | Maecky Ngombo (from (Netherlands) Go Ahead Eagles) |
| — | GK | ALG | Toufik Moussaoui (from (Algeria) Paradou AC) |
| — | FW | BEN | Marcellin Koukpo (from (Tunisia) CS Hammam-Lif) |
| — | DF | ALG | Anes Saad (from (Algeria) USM Bel Abbès) |

Out: Note: Flags indicate national team as defined under FIFA eligibility rules; some limited exceptions apply. Players may hold more than one non-FIFA nationality.

| No. | Pos. | Nation | Player |
|---|---|---|---|
| — | DF | ALG | Mohamed Khoutir Ziti (to (Libya) Nasr Benghazi) |
| — | FW | ALG | Ahmed Gasmi (Unattached) |
| — | MF | ALG | Toufik Zerara (Unattached) |
| — | FW | ALG | Islam Bendif (Unattached) |
| — | GK | ALG | Khairi Barki (to (Algeria) ES Sétif) |

=== CS Constantine ===
In: Note: Flags indicate national team as defined under FIFA eligibility rules; some limited exceptions apply. Players may hold more than one non-FIFA nationality.

| No. | Pos. | Nation | Player |
|---|---|---|---|
| — | DF | ALG | Ahmed Maâmeri (from (Algeria) WA Boufarik) |
| — | MF | ALG | Amine Baghdaoui (from (Algeria) ASM Oran) |
| — | FW | ALG | Fayek Amrane (from (Algeria) CA Batna) |
| — | DF | ALG | Idir Mokeddem (from (Algeria) WA Boufarik) |
| — | FW | ALG | Brahim Dib (from (Algeria) AS Ain M'lila) |
| — | FW | ALG | Issad Lakdja (from (Algeria) NC Magra) |
| — | MF | SDN | Sharafeldin Shaiboub (from (Tanzania) Simba Sports Club) |
| — | MF | ALG | Ilyes Yaiche (from (Algeria) USM Alger) |
| — | DF | ALG | Mohamed Guemroud (from (Algeria) AS Ain M'lila) |

Out: Note: Flags indicate national team as defined under FIFA eligibility rules; some limited exceptions apply. Players may hold more than one non-FIFA nationality.

| No. | Pos. | Nation | Player |
|---|---|---|---|
| — | GK | ALG | Houssem Limane (to (Algeria) MC Oran) |
| — | MF | ALG | Sid Ahmed Aouadj (to (United Arab Emirates) Dibba Al-Hisn) |
| — | DF | ALG | Houcine Benayada (to (Tunisia) Club Africain) |
| — | FW | ALG | Ismail Belkacemi (to (Algeria) USM Alger) |
| — | MF | ALG | Karim Benkouider (to (Algeria) NC Magra) |
| — | MF | ALG | Abou Sofiane Balegh (to (Algeria) RC Relizane) |

=== ES Sétif ===
In: Note: Flags indicate national team as defined under FIFA eligibility rules; some limited exceptions apply. Players may hold more than one non-FIFA nationality.

| No. | Pos. | Nation | Player |
|---|---|---|---|
| — | GK | ALG | Khairi Barki (from (Algeria) CR Belouizdad) |

Out: Note: Flags indicate national team as defined under FIFA eligibility rules; some limited exceptions apply. Players may hold more than one non-FIFA nationality.

| No. | Pos. | Nation | Player |
|---|---|---|---|
| — | FW | ALG | Ishak Talal Boussouf (to (Belgium) Kortrijk) |
| — | MF | ALG | Zakaria Draoui (to (Algeria) CR Belouizdad) |
| — | DF | ALG | Saâdi Radouani (to (Algeria) USM Alger) |

=== JS Kabylie ===
In: Note: Flags indicate national team as defined under FIFA eligibility rules; some limited exceptions apply. Players may hold more than one non-FIFA nationality.

| No. | Pos. | Nation | Player |
|---|---|---|---|
| — | MF | ALG | Mehdi Ferrahi (from (Algeria) RC Kouba) |
| — | MF | ALG | Houdeifa Arfi (from (Algeria) RC Arbaâ) |
| — | FW | ALG | Said Hadji Habib (from (Algeria) ASO Chlef) |
| — | DF | ALG | Ahmed Kerroum (from (Algeria) ASM Oran) |
| — | DF | ALG | Abdelmoumen Chikhi (from (Algeria) NC Magra) |
| — | GK | ALG | Abdelatif Ramdane (from (Algeria) MC Alger U21) |
| — | DF | ALG | Aziz Benabdi (from (Algeria) MO Béjaïa) |
| — | FW | ALG | Chaker Kaddour Chérif (from (Algeria) ASO Chlef) |

Out: Note: Flags indicate national team as defined under FIFA eligibility rules; some limited exceptions apply. Players may hold more than one non-FIFA nationality.

| No. | Pos. | Nation | Player |
|---|---|---|---|
| — | MF | ALG | Abderzak Iratni (Unattached) |
| — | DF | ALG | Walid Bencherifa (Unattached) |
| — | MF | ALG | Toufik Addadi (to (Algeria) MC Alger) |
| — | DF | ALG | Toufik Zeghdane (Unattached) |
| — | DF | ALG | Amir Bellaili (to (Algeria) AS Ain M'lila) |
| — | DF | ALG | Nabil Saâdou (to (Algeria) MC Alger) |
| — | FW | ALG | Abdelwahid Belgherbi (to (Algeria) USM Bel Abbès) |

=== JS Saoura ===
In: Note: Flags indicate national team as defined under FIFA eligibility rules; some limited exceptions apply. Players may hold more than one non-FIFA nationality.

| No. | Pos. | Nation | Player |
|---|---|---|---|
| — | FW | ALG | Mehdi Derrouache (from (Algeria) CA Bordj Bou Arreridj) |
| — | DF | ALG | Mohamed Amrane (from (Algeria) CA Bordj Bou Arreridj) |

Out: Note: Flags indicate national team as defined under FIFA eligibility rules; some limited exceptions apply. Players may hold more than one non-FIFA nationality.

| No. | Pos. | Nation | Player |
|---|---|---|---|
| — | MF | ALG | Khalil Semahi (to (Algeria) USM Bel Abbès) |

=== MC Alger ===
In: Note: Flags indicate national team as defined under FIFA eligibility rules; some limited exceptions apply. Players may hold more than one non-FIFA nationality.

| No. | Pos. | Nation | Player |
|---|---|---|---|
| — | DF | ALG | Mouad Hadded (from (Algeria) JSM Skikda) |
| — | MF | CIV | Isla Daoudi Diomande (from (Algeria) CA Bordj Bou Arreridj) |
| — | GK | ALG | Abdelkader Salhi (Unattached) |
| — | FW | ALG | Abdelhak Abdelhafid (from (Algeria) MC Oran) |
| — | DF | ALG | Nabil Saâdou (from (Algeria) JS Kabylie) |
| — | MF | ALG | Toufik Addadi (from (Algeria) JS Kabylie) |

Out: Note: Flags indicate national team as defined under FIFA eligibility rules; some limited exceptions apply. Players may hold more than one non-FIFA nationality.

| No. | Pos. | Nation | Player |
|---|---|---|---|
| — | FW | ALG | Hichem Nekkache (to (Algeria) MC Oran) |
| — | GK | ALG | Abdelatif Ramdane (to (Algeria) JS Kabylie) |
| — | FW | ALG | Walid Derrardja (to (Algeria) MC Oran) |

=== MC Oran ===
In: Note: Flags indicate national team as defined under FIFA eligibility rules; some limited exceptions apply. Players may hold more than one non-FIFA nationality.

| No. | Pos. | Nation | Player |
|---|---|---|---|
| — | GK | ALG | Houssem Limane (from (Algeria) CS Constantine) |
| — | FW | ALG | Adel Khettab (from (Algeria) WA Boufarik) |
| — | FW | ALG | Hichem Nekkache (from (Algeria) MC Alger) |
| — | DF | ALG | Mohamed Naâmani (from (Saudi Arabia) Al-Fateh SC) |
| — | FW | ALG | Walid Derrardja (from (Algeria) MC Alger) |

Out: Note: Flags indicate national team as defined under FIFA eligibility rules; some limited exceptions apply. Players may hold more than one non-FIFA nationality.

| No. | Pos. | Nation | Player |
|---|---|---|---|
| — | DF | ALG | Zine El-Abidine Sebbah (to (Algeria) NA Hussein Dey) |
| — | FW | ALG | Rachid Nadji (to (Algeria) NA Hussein Dey) |
| — | MF | ALG | Abderraouf Chouiter (to (Algeria) NA Hussein Dey) |
| — | FW | ALG | Abdelhak Abdelhafid (to (Algeria) MC Alger) |

=== NA Hussein Dey ===
In: Note: Flags indicate national team as defined under FIFA eligibility rules; some limited exceptions apply. Players may hold more than one non-FIFA nationality.

| No. | Pos. | Nation | Player |
|---|---|---|---|
| — | MF | ALG | Hocine El Orfi (from (Saudi Arabia) Al-Mujazzal) |
| — | FW | ALG | Réda Betrouni (from (Algeria) JSM Skikda) |
| — | MF | ALG | Mohamed Sabri Benbrahim (from (Tunisia) US Tataouine) |
| — | FW | ALG | Younès Islam (from (Algeria) RC Boumerdes) |
| — | DF | ALG | Mohamed Rabie Meftah (from (Algeria) USM Alger) |
| — | DF | ALG | Zine El-Abidine Sebbah (from (Algeria) MC Oran) |
| — | FW | ALG | Rachid Nadji (from (Algeria) MC Oran) |
| — | MF | ALG | Abderraouf Chouiter (from (Algeria) MC Oran) |

Out: Note: Flags indicate national team as defined under FIFA eligibility rules; some limited exceptions apply. Players may hold more than one non-FIFA nationality.

| No. | Pos. | Nation | Player |

=== NC Magra ===
In: Note: Flags indicate national team as defined under FIFA eligibility rules; some limited exceptions apply. Players may hold more than one non-FIFA nationality.

| No. | Pos. | Nation | Player |
|---|---|---|---|
| — | MF | ALG | Karim Benkouider (from (Algeria) CS Constantine) |
| — | FW | ALG | Abdesslem Bouchouareb (from (Algeria) AS Khroub) |
| — | MF | ALG | Nadir Korichi (from (Tunisia) US Tataouine) |
| — | FW | ALG | Hadj Bouguèche (from (Algeria) WA Tlemcen) |

Out: Note: Flags indicate national team as defined under FIFA eligibility rules; some limited exceptions apply. Players may hold more than one non-FIFA nationality.

| No. | Pos. | Nation | Player |
|---|---|---|---|
| — | DF | ALG | Abdelmoumen Chikhi (to (Algeria) JS Kabylie) |
| — | FW | ALG | Issad Lakdja (from (Algeria) CS Constantine) |

=== Paradou AC ===
In: Note: Flags indicate national team as defined under FIFA eligibility rules; some limited exceptions apply. Players may hold more than one non-FIFA nationality.

| No. | Pos. | Nation | Player |
|---|---|---|---|
| — | GK | ALG | Omar Hadji (from (Algeria) AS Ain M'lila) |

Out: Note: Flags indicate national team as defined under FIFA eligibility rules; some limited exceptions apply. Players may hold more than one non-FIFA nationality.

| No. | Pos. | Nation | Player |
|---|---|---|---|
| — | GK | ALG | Toufik Moussaoui (to (Algeria) CR Belouizdad) |
| — | MF | ALG | Taher Benkhelifa (to (Algeria) USM Alger) |

=== US Biskra ===
In: Note: Flags indicate national team as defined under FIFA eligibility rules; some limited exceptions apply. Players may hold more than one non-FIFA nationality.

| No. | Pos. | Nation | Player |

Out: Note: Flags indicate national team as defined under FIFA eligibility rules; some limited exceptions apply. Players may hold more than one non-FIFA nationality.

| No. | Pos. | Nation | Player |

=== USM Bel Abbès ===
In: Note: Flags indicate national team as defined under FIFA eligibility rules; some limited exceptions apply. Players may hold more than one non-FIFA nationality.

| No. | Pos. | Nation | Player |
|---|---|---|---|
| — | DF | ALG | Mohamed Tiboutine (from (Algeria) USM Alger) |
| — | MF | ALG | Nazim Itim (from (Algeria) MC Oran) |
| — | MF | ALG | Mohamed El Amine Belmokhtar (from (Algeria) CA Bordj Bou Arreridj) |
| — | FW | ALG | Abdelwahid Belgherbi (from (Algeria) JS Kabylie) |
| — | DF | ALG | Mustapha Kheiraoui (from (Algeria) USM Alger) |
| — | MF | ALG | Khalil Semahi (from (Algeria) JS Saoura) |

Out: Note: Flags indicate national team as defined under FIFA eligibility rules; some limited exceptions apply. Players may hold more than one non-FIFA nationality.

| No. | Pos. | Nation | Player |
|---|---|---|---|
| — | DF | ALG | Fateh Achour (to (Algeria) USM Alger) |
| — | MF | ALG | Abdennour Belhocini (to (Qatar) Umm Salal) |
| — | DF | ALG | Anes Saad (to (Algeria) CR Belouizdad) |
| — | FW | ALG | Ameur Bouguettaya (to (Algeria) ASO Chlef) |

=== Olympique de Médéa ===
In: Note: Flags indicate national team as defined under FIFA eligibility rules; some limited exceptions apply. Players may hold more than one non-FIFA nationality.

| No. | Pos. | Nation | Player |
|---|---|---|---|
| — | FW | ALG | Tawfiq Elghomari (from (Algeria) CA Bordj Bou Arreridj) |
| — | FW | ALG | Mohamed El Seddik Baâli (from (Algeria) A Bou Saâda) |
| — | DF | ALG | Ryad Gariche (from (Algeria) MC Saïda) |
| — | MF | ALG | Mohamed Taib (from (Algeria) AS Ain M'lila) |
| — | DF | ALG | Ryad Kenniche (from (Tunisia) US Tataouine) |

Out: Note: Flags indicate national team as defined under FIFA eligibility rules; some limited exceptions apply. Players may hold more than one non-FIFA nationality.

| No. | Pos. | Nation | Player |

=== JSM Skikda ===
In: Note: Flags indicate national team as defined under FIFA eligibility rules; some limited exceptions apply. Players may hold more than one non-FIFA nationality.

| No. | Pos. | Nation | Player |
|---|---|---|---|
| — | MF | ALG | Abdelkader Boussaid (from (Algeria) ASO Chlef) |
| — | FW | ALG | Abdelkader Kaibou (from (Algeria) ASO Chlef) |
| — | FW | ALG | Ishak Bouda (from (Algeria) USM Bel Abbès) |

Out: Note: Flags indicate national team as defined under FIFA eligibility rules; some limited exceptions apply. Players may hold more than one non-FIFA nationality.

| No. | Pos. | Nation | Player |
|---|---|---|---|
| — | DF | ALG | Mouad Hadded (to (Algeria) MC Alger) |
| — | FW | ALG | Réda Betrouni (to (Algeria) NA Hussein Dey) |
| — | MF | ALG | Mustapha Zeghnoun (to (Algeria) ASO Chlef) |

=== WA Tlemcen ===
In: Note: Flags indicate national team as defined under FIFA eligibility rules; some limited exceptions apply. Players may hold more than one non-FIFA nationality.

| No. | Pos. | Nation | Player |
|---|---|---|---|
| — | MF | ALG | Djamel Belalem (from (Algeria) Olympique de Médéa) |
| — | MF | ALG | Ali Amiri (from (Algeria) RC Arbaâ) |
| — | DF | ALG | Djamel Ibouzidène (from (Algeria) AS Ain M'lila) |
| — | MF | ALG | Abdallah Bencheikh (from (Algeria) ASM Oran) |
| — | MF | ALG | Mohamed Belaribi (from (Algeria) ASM Oran) |
| — | MF | ALG | Ahmida Zenasni (from (Algeria) JSM Béjaïa) |
| — | FW | ALG | Mounir Aichi (from (Algeria) USM Bel Abbès) |
| — | DF | ALG | Kheireddine Benamrane (from (Algeria) ASO Chlef) |

Out: Note: Flags indicate national team as defined under FIFA eligibility rules; some limited exceptions apply. Players may hold more than one non-FIFA nationality.

| No. | Pos. | Nation | Player |
|---|---|---|---|
| — | FW | ALG | Hadj Bouguèche (to (Algeria) NC Magra) |
| — | DF | ALG | Amir Benmerzouga (Unattached) |
| — | DF | ALG | Benali Arbaoui (Unattached) |
| — | MF | ALG | Ammar Abdelmalek Oukil (Unattached) |
| — | MF | ALG | Mohamed Bouflih (Unattached) |
| — | FW | ALG | Ahmed Messadia (Unattached) |
| — | DF | ALG | Amir Aguid (Unattached) |
| — | FW | ALG | Walid Sbia (Unattached) |
| — | GK | ALG | Mohammed Bouchaour (Unattached) |
| — | DF | ALG | Mahfoud Bellounes (Unattached) |

=== RC Relizane ===
In: Note: Flags indicate national team as defined under FIFA eligibility rules; some limited exceptions apply. Players may hold more than one non-FIFA nationality.

| No. | Pos. | Nation | Player |
|---|---|---|---|
| — | GK | ALG | Hamza Bousseder (from (Algeria) US Biskra) |
| — | MF | ALG | Mohamed Réda Nekrouf (from (Algeria) MC Saïda) |
| — | MF | ALG | Mehdi Kadri (from (Algeria) MO Béjaïa) |
| — | MF | ALG | Younes Koulkheir (from (Algeria) USM Bel Abbès) |
| — | MF | ALG | Abou Sofiane Balegh (from (Algeria) CS Constantine) |
| — | MF | ALG | Noufel Ould Hamou (from (Algeria) CR Belouizdad) |

Out: Note: Flags indicate national team as defined under FIFA eligibility rules; some limited exceptions apply. Players may hold more than one non-FIFA nationality.

| No. | Pos. | Nation | Player |

=== USM Alger ===
In: Note: Flags indicate national team as defined under FIFA eligibility rules; some limited exceptions apply. Players may hold more than one non-FIFA nationality.

| No. | Pos. | Nation | Player |
|---|---|---|---|
| — | FW | ALG | Oussama Abdeldjelil (from (France) SO Cholet) |
| — | DF | ALG | Saâdi Radouani (from (Algeria) ES Sétif) |
| — | DF | ALG | Fateh Achour (from (Algeria) USM Bel Abbès) |
| — | FW | ALG | Yacine Aliane (from (Algeria) Reserve team) |
| — | FW | ALG | Ahmed Bedjaoui (from (Algeria) Reserve team) |
| — | GK | ALG | Zinedine Abassi (from (Algeria) Reserve team) |
| — | FW | ALG | Abdelkrim Louanchi (from (Algeria) Reserve team) |
| — | MF | ALG | Mohamed Djenidi (from (Algeria) Reserve team) |
| — | DF | ALG | Wassim Ouhab (from (Algeria) Reserve team) |
| — | FW | ALG | Ismail Belkacemi (from (Algeria) CS Constantine) |
| — | DF | FRA | Mehdi Beneddine (from (France) Quevilly-Rouen) |
| — | MF | FRA | Salim Akkal (from (France) Angers SCO B) |
| — | FW | FRA | Mazire Soula (from (France) Angers SCO B) |
| — | GK | FRA | Alexis Guendouz (from (France) AS Saint-Étienne) |
| — | MF | ALG | Taher Benkhelifa (from (Algeria) Paradou AC) |
| — | FW | ALG | Zakaria Benchaâ (Loan Return from (Tunisia) CS Sfaxien) |
| — | DF | ALG | Zineddine Belaïd (from (Algeria) NA Hussein Dey) |

Out: Note: Flags indicate national team as defined under FIFA eligibility rules; some limited exceptions apply. Players may hold more than one non-FIFA nationality.

| No. | Pos. | Nation | Player |
|---|---|---|---|
| — | MF | ALG | Taher Benkhelifa (Loan return to (Algeria) Paradou AC) |
| — | DF | ALG | Mohamed Rabie Meftah (to (Algeria) NA Hussein Dey) |
| — | GK | ALG | Ismaïl Mansouri (to (Algeria) MO Béjaïa) |
| — | MF | ALG | Ilyes Yaiche (to (Algeria) CS Constantine) |
| — | FW | ALG | Oualid Ardji (Unattached) |
| — | FW | ALG | Adem Redjehimi (to (Algeria) CS Constantine) |
| — | DF | ALG | Mohamed Tiboutine (to (Algeria) USM Bel Abbès) |
| — | DF | ALG | Redouane Cherifi (to (Egypt) Ismaily SC) |
| — | DF | ALG | Mustapha Kheiraoui (to (Algeria) USM Bel Abbès) |
| — | DF | ALG | Lyes Oukkal (to (Algeria) JSM Skikda) |
| — | DF | ALG | Hicham Belkaroui (to MC Oran) |
| — | MF | LBY | Muaid Ellafi (to (Morocco) Wydad Casablanca) |
