= List of Algerian football transfers summer 2019 =

This is a list of Algerian football transfers in the 2019 summer transfer window by club. Clubs in the 2019–20 Algerian Ligue Professionnelle 1 are included.

== Ligue Professionnelle 1 ==
=== AS Ain M'lila ===
In: Note: Flags indicate national team as defined under FIFA eligibility rules; some limited exceptions apply. Players may hold more than one non-FIFA nationality.

No.	Pos.	Nation	Player
—	FW	ALG	Abdeldjalil Layati (from (Algeria) USM El Harrach)

Out: Note: Flags indicate national team as defined under FIFA eligibility rules; some limited exceptions apply. Players may hold more than one non-FIFA nationality.

No.	Pos.	Nation	Player
—	DF	ALG	Zineddine Benyahia (to (Algeria) CS Constantine)

=== ASO Chlef ===
In: Note: Flags indicate national team as defined under FIFA eligibility rules; some limited exceptions apply. Players may hold more than one non-FIFA nationality.

No.	Pos.	Nation	Player
—	MF	MLI	Massiré Dembélé (from (Algeria) Olympique de Médéa)

Out: Note: Flags indicate national team as defined under FIFA eligibility rules; some limited exceptions apply. Players may hold more than one non-FIFA nationality.

No.	Pos.	Nation	Player

=== CA Bordj Bou Arreridj ===
In: Note: Flags indicate national team as defined under FIFA eligibility rules; some limited exceptions apply. Players may hold more than one non-FIFA nationality.

No.	Pos.	Nation	Player
—	FW	ALG	Mohamed El Amine Belmokhtar (from (Algeria) CS Constantine)
—	FW	ALG	Ahmed Gagaa (from (Algeria) CS Constantine)
—	MF	ALG	El Hedi Belameiri (from (Cyprus) Alki Oroklini)
—	FW	CIV	Ghislain Guessan (from (Romania) Concordia Chiajna)
—	DF	ALG	Meziane Zeroual (from (Algeria) CR Belouizdad)
—	DF	ALG	Mohamed Hammouche (from (Saudi Arabia) Al-Qaisumah)
—	GK	ALG	Cédric Si Mohamed (from (Algeria) CR Belouizdad)
—	DF	ALG	Kheireddine Arroussi (from (Algeria) CS Constantine)
—	FW	ALG	Mourad Benayad (from (Algeria) USM Bel Abbès)

Out: Note: Flags indicate national team as defined under FIFA eligibility rules; some limited exceptions apply. Players may hold more than one non-FIFA nationality.

No.	Pos.	Nation	Player
—	DF	ALG	Mohamed Khoutir Ziti (to CR Belouizdad)
—	MF	ALG	Bassam Chaouti (to MC Oran)
—	FW	ALG	Walid Athmani (to (Algeria) CS Constantine)
—	MF	ALG	Messaoud Gherbi (to (Algeria) MO Béjaïa)
—	MF	ALG	Abdelmalek Meftahi (to (Algeria) JSM Béjaïa)

=== CR Belouizdad ===
In: Note: Flags indicate national team as defined under FIFA eligibility rules; some limited exceptions apply. Players may hold more than one non-FIFA nationality.

No.	Pos.	Nation	Player
—	DF	ALG	Zakaria Khali (from (Algeria) USM Bel Abbès)
—	DF	ALG	Mohamed Khoutir Ziti (from CA Bordj Bou Arreridj)
—	FW	ALG	Ahmed Gasmi (from NA Hussein Dey)
—	MF	ALG	Larbi Tabti (from (Algeria) USM Bel Abbès)
—	GK	ALG	Gaya Merbah (from NA Hussein Dey)

Out: Note: Flags indicate national team as defined under FIFA eligibility rules; some limited exceptions apply. Players may hold more than one non-FIFA nationality.

No.	Pos.	Nation	Player
—	FW	ALG	Djamel Chettal (to (Tunisia) CA Bizertin)
—	MF	ALG	Djamel Rabti (to Unattached)
—	GK	ALG	Lyes Meziane (to Unattached)
—	FW	ALG	Mohamed Herida (to Unattached)
—	DF	ALG	Meziane Zeroual (to (Algeria) CA Bordj Bou Arreridj)
—	FW	ALG	Mohamed Attia (to (Tunisia) AS Soliman),
—	GK	ALG	Cédric Si Mohamed (to (Algeria) CA Bordj Bou Arreridj)
—	FW	ALG	Abou Sofiane Balegh (to (Algeria) CS Constantine)

=== CS Constantine ===
In: Note: Flags indicate national team as defined under FIFA eligibility rules; some limited exceptions apply. Players may hold more than one non-FIFA nationality.

No.	Pos.	Nation	Player
—	FW	ALG	Abdelhakim Amokrane (from (Algeria) MO Béjaïa)
—	DF	ALG	Ayache Ziouache (from (Algeria) NC Magra)
—	MF	ALG	Kamel Belmessaoud (from (Algeria) JSM Béjaïa)
—	DF	ALG	Zineddine Benyahia (from (Algeria) AS Ain M'lila)
—	FW	ALG	Walid Athmani (from (Algeria) CA Bordj Bou Arreridj)
—	FW	ALG	Abou Sofiane Balegh (from (Algeria) CR Belouizdad)
—	MF	ALG	Sid Ahmed Aouadj (from (Algeria) MC Oran)
—	FW	ALG	Youcef Chibane (from (Saudi Arabia) Al-Qaisumah)
—	DF	ALG	Brahim Boudebouda (from (Algeria) MC Oran)

Out: Note: Flags indicate national team as defined under FIFA eligibility rules; some limited exceptions apply. Players may hold more than one non-FIFA nationality.

No.	Pos.	Nation	Player
—	GK	ALG	Chamseddine Rahmani (to (Saudi Arabia) Damac)
—	FW	ALG	Mohamed El Amine Belmokhtar (to (Algeria) CA Bordj Bou Arreridj)
—	FW	ALG	Ahmed Gagaa (to (Algeria) CA Bordj Bou Arreridj)
—	MF	ALG	Kaddour Beldjilali (to (Algeria) JS Saoura)
—	MF	ALG	Mohamed Walid Bencherifa (to (Algeria) JS Kabylie)
—	FW	ALG	Abdenour Belkheir (to (Algeria) MC Alger)
—	FW	ALG	Mounir Aichi (From (Algeria) CS Constantine)
—	DF	ALG	Kheireddine Arroussi (to (Algeria) CA Bordj Bou Arreridj)

=== ES Sétif ===
In: Note: Flags indicate national team as defined under FIFA eligibility rules; some limited exceptions apply. Players may hold more than one non-FIFA nationality.

No.	Pos.	Nation	Player
—	FW	ALG	Oussama Tebbi (from (Algeria) MC Alger)
—	FW	ALG	Mohamed Souibaâh (from (Algeria) MC Alger)
—	DF	ALG	Abdelghani Khiat (from (Algeria) NA Hussein Dey)
—	MF	ALG	Hocine Laribi (from (Algeria) NA Hussein Dey)
—	DF	ALG	Abdelhak Debbari (from (Algeria) MO Béjaïa)
—	GK	ALG	Sofiane Khedairia (from (Algeria) USM Bel Abbès)

Out: Note: Flags indicate national team as defined under FIFA eligibility rules; some limited exceptions apply. Players may hold more than one non-FIFA nationality.

No.	Pos.	Nation	Player
—	MF	ALG	Abdelmoumene Djabou (to (Algeria) MC Alger)
—	FW	ALG	Hamza Banouh (to (Algeria) JS Kabylie)
—	DF	ALG	Abdelkader Bedrane (to (Tunisia) Espérance ST)
—	MF	ALG	Mohamed Islam Bakir (to (Tunisia) CS Sfaxien)
—	GK	ALG	Moustapha Zeghba (to (Saudi Arabia) Al-Wehda)
—	DF	ALG	Aïssa Boudechicha (to (France) Girondins de Bordeaux)

=== JS Kabylie ===
In: Note: Flags indicate national team as defined under FIFA eligibility rules; some limited exceptions apply. Players may hold more than one non-FIFA nationality.

No.	Pos.	Nation	Player
—	FW	ALG	Toufik Addadi (from (Algeria) Olympique de Médéa)
—	FW	ALG	Hamza Banouh (from (Algeria) ES Sétif)
—	FW	ALG	Rédha Bensayah (from (Algeria) JSM Béjaïa)
—	MF	ALG	Ammar El Orfi (from (Algeria) USM Alger)
—	MF	ALG	Abdessamed Bounoua (from (Algeria) USM Bel Abbès)
—	MF	ALG	Mohamed Walid Bencherifa (tfrom (Algeria) CS Constantine)
—	MF	ALG	Salim Boukhenchouche (Loan return from (Algeria) MO Béjaïa)
—	DF	ALG	Toufik Zeghdane (from (France) Sedan)

Out: Note: Flags indicate national team as defined under FIFA eligibility rules; some limited exceptions apply. Players may hold more than one non-FIFA nationality.

No.	Pos.	Nation	Player
—	FW	NGA	Uche Nwofor (Unattached)
—	MF	ALG	Taher Benkhelifa (Loan Return to (Algeria) Paradou AC)
—	MF	ALG	Ilyes Chetti (to (Tunisia) Espérance ST)
—	MF	ALG	Salim Boukhenchouche (to (Tunisia) ES Sahel)

=== JS Saoura ===
In: Note: Flags indicate national team as defined under FIFA eligibility rules; some limited exceptions apply. Players may hold more than one non-FIFA nationality.

No.	Pos.	Nation	Player
—	MF	ALG	Khalil Semahi (from (Algeria) MO Béjaïa)
—	MF	ALG	Oussama Medahi (from (Algeria) DRB Tadjenanet)
—	FW	ALG	Mohamed Toumi (from (Algeria) MC Oran)
—	MF	ALG	Kaddour Beldjilali (from (Algeria) CS Constantine)
—	GK	ALG	Abderaouf Natèche (from (Saudi Arabia) Ohod)

Out: Note: Flags indicate national team as defined under FIFA eligibility rules; some limited exceptions apply. Players may hold more than one non-FIFA nationality.

No.	Pos.	Nation	Player
—	FW	ALG	Moustapha Djallit (Retired)
—	DF	ALG	Mohamed Tiboutine (to (Algeria) USM Alger)

=== MC Alger ===
In: Note: Flags indicate national team as defined under FIFA eligibility rules; some limited exceptions apply. Players may hold more than one non-FIFA nationality.

No.	Pos.	Nation	Player
—	DF	ALG	Walid Allati (from (Algeria) NA Hussein Dey)
—	DF	ALG	Belkacem Brahimi (from (Algeria) NA Hussein Dey)
—	MF	ALG	Abdelmoumene Djabou (from (Algeria) ES Sétif)
—	GK	ALG	Ahmed Boutagga (from (Algeria) USM Blida)
—	FW	ALG	Abdenour Belkheir (from (Algeria) CS Constantine)
—	FW	CMR	Rooney Eva Wankewai (from (Greece) Aittitos Spata)
—	DF	ALG	Farouk Chafaï (from (Algeria) USM Alger)
—	GK	ALG	Athmane Toual (from (Algeria) USM Bel Abbès)

Out: Note: Flags indicate national team as defined under FIFA eligibility rules; some limited exceptions apply. Players may hold more than one non-FIFA nationality.

No.	Pos.	Nation	Player
—	FW	ALG	Oussama Tebbi (to (Algeria) ES Sétif)
—	FW	ALG	Mohamed Souibaâh (to (Algeria) ES Sétif)
—	MF	MAD	Ibrahim Amada (to Unattached)
—	DF	ALG	Abdelghani Demmou (to Unattached)
—	FW	ALG	Zakaria Haddouche (to (Algeria) USM Alger)
—	MF	MLI	Aliou Dieng (to (Egypt) Al Ahly)
—	GK	ALG	Abdelkader Morcely (to (Algeria) USM Bel Abbès)

=== MC Oran ===
In: Note: Flags indicate national team as defined under FIFA eligibility rules; some limited exceptions apply. Players may hold more than one non-FIFA nationality.

No.	Pos.	Nation	Player
—	FW	ALG	Zoubir Motrani (from (Algeria) Olympique de Médéa)
—	DF	ALG	Mohamed Lagraâ (from (Algeria) USM Bel Abbès)
—	DF	ALG	Senoussi Fourloul (from (Algeria) DRB Tadjenanet)
—	FW	ALG	Mahi Benhamou (from (Algeria) SA Mohammadia)
—	MF	ALG	Bassam Chaouti (from CA Bordj Bou Arreridj)
—	FW	ALG	Mohamed Amine Hamia (from (Algeria) USM Alger)

Out: Note: Flags indicate national team as defined under FIFA eligibility rules; some limited exceptions apply. Players may hold more than one non-FIFA nationality.

No.	Pos.	Nation	Player
—	DF	ALG	Réda Halaïmia (to (Belgium) K Beerschot VA)
—	FW	ALG	Mohamed Toumi (to (Algeria) JS Saoura)
—	MF	ALG	Sid Ahmed Aouadj (to (Algeria) CS Constantine)
—	MF	ALG	Sabri Gharbi (to (Algeria) USM Bel Abbès)
—	DF	ALG	Brahim Boudebouda (to (Algeria) CS Constantine)

=== NA Hussein Dey ===
In: Note: Flags indicate national team as defined under FIFA eligibility rules; some limited exceptions apply. Players may hold more than one non-FIFA nationality.

No.	Pos.	Nation	Player

Out: Note: Flags indicate national team as defined under FIFA eligibility rules; some limited exceptions apply. Players may hold more than one non-FIFA nationality.

No.	Pos.	Nation	Player
—	DF	ALG	Walid Allati (to (Algeria) MC Alger)
—	DF	ALG	Belkacem Brahimi (to (Algeria) MC Alger)
—	DF	ALG	Abdelghani Khiat (to (Algeria) ES Sétif)
—	MF	ALG	Ilyes Oukkal (to (Algeria) USM Alger)
—	GK	ALG	Kheireddine Boussouf (to (Saudi Arabia) Al-Tai FC)
—	FW	ALG	Ahmed Gasmi (to CR Belouizdad)
—	MF	ALG	Hocine Laribi (to (Algeria) ES Sétif)
—	GK	ALG	Gaya Merbah (to CR Belouizdad)

=== NC Magra ===
In: Note: Flags indicate national team as defined under FIFA eligibility rules; some limited exceptions apply. Players may hold more than one non-FIFA nationality.

No.	Pos.	Nation	Player

Out: Note: Flags indicate national team as defined under FIFA eligibility rules; some limited exceptions apply. Players may hold more than one non-FIFA nationality.

No.	Pos.	Nation	Player
—	DF	ALG	Ayache Ziouache (to (Algeria) CS Constantine)

=== Paradou AC ===
In: Note: Flags indicate national team as defined under FIFA eligibility rules; some limited exceptions apply. Players may hold more than one non-FIFA nationality.

No.	Pos.	Nation	Player
—	MF	ALG	Raouf Benguit (Loan Return from (Algeria) USM Alger)
—	MF	ALG	Taher Benkhelifa (Loan Return from (Algeria) JS Kabylie)

Out: Note: Flags indicate national team as defined under FIFA eligibility rules; some limited exceptions apply. Players may hold more than one non-FIFA nationality.

No.	Pos.	Nation	Player
—	MF	ALG	Taher Benkhelifa (Loan to (Algeria) USM Alger)
—	MF	ALG	Raouf Benguit (to (Tunisia) Espérance ST)
—	FW	ALG	Zakaria Naidji (Loan to (Portugal) Gil Vicente)
—	MF	ALG	Hicham Boudaoui (to (France) Nice)
—	DF	ALG	Haithem Loucif (to (France) Angers)

=== USM Alger ===
In: Note: Flags indicate national team as defined under FIFA eligibility rules; some limited exceptions apply. Players may hold more than one non-FIFA nationality.

No.	Pos.	Nation	Player
—	DF	ALG	Anis Khemaissia (from (Algeria) USM Annaba)
—	MF	ALG	Lyes Oukkal (from (Algeria) NA Hussein Dey)
—	MF	ALG	Taher Benkhelifa (Loan from (Algeria) Paradou AC)
—	FW	ALG	Zakaria Haddouche (from (Algeria) MC Alger)
—	FW	ALG	Karim Louanchi (from Reserve team)
—	DF	ALG	Mustapha Kheiraoui (from (Algeria) Amal Bou Saâda)
—	DF	ALG	Mohamed Tiboutine (from (Algeria) JS Saoura)
—	DF	ALG	Hicham Belkaroui (from (Saudi Arabia) Al-Raed)
—	FW	ALG	Adem Redjehimi (from (Italy) Afro Napoli United)

Out: Note: Flags indicate national team as defined under FIFA eligibility rules; some limited exceptions apply. Players may hold more than one non-FIFA nationality.

No.	Pos.	Nation	Player
—	MF	ALG	Rafik Bouderbal (to (France) AS Lyon-Duchère)
—	FW	ALG	Abderrahmane Meziane (to (United Arab Emirates) Al Ain)
—	MF	ALG	Ammar El Orfi (to (Algeria) JS Kabylie)
—	MF	ALG	Raouf Benguit (Loan Return to (Algeria) Paradou AC)
—	DF	ALG	Farouk Chafaï (to (Algeria) MC Alger)
—	DF	ALG	Mokhtar Benmoussa (to (Algeria) USM Bel Abbès)
—	GK	ALG	Mourad Berrefane (to (Algeria) RC Relizane)
—	MF	ALG	Mohammed Benkhemassa (to (Spain) Málaga CF)
—	FW	ALG	Prince Ibara (to (Belgium) K Beerschot)
—	FW	ALG	Mohamed Amine Hamia (to (Algeria) MC Oran)

=== US Biskra ===
In: Note: Flags indicate national team as defined under FIFA eligibility rules; some limited exceptions apply. Players may hold more than one non-FIFA nationality.

No.	Pos.	Nation	Player

Out: Note: Flags indicate national team as defined under FIFA eligibility rules; some limited exceptions apply. Players may hold more than one non-FIFA nationality.

No.	Pos.	Nation	Player

=== USM Bel Abbès ===
In: Note: Flags indicate national team as defined under FIFA eligibility rules; some limited exceptions apply. Players may hold more than one non-FIFA nationality.

No.	Pos.	Nation	Player
—	GK	ALG	Abdelkader Morcely (From (Algeria) MC Alger)
—	MF	ALG	Sabri Gharbi (From (Algeria) MC Oran)
—	FW	ALG	Mounir Aichi (From (Algeria) CS Constantine)
—	FW	MLI	Moctar Cissé (From (Saudi Arabia) Al-Ain)
—	FW	ALG	Okacha Hamzaoui (From (Portugal) Nacional)
—	DF	ALG	Mokhtar Benmoussa (From (Algeria) USM Alger)

Out: Note: Flags indicate national team as defined under FIFA eligibility rules; some limited exceptions apply. Players may hold more than one non-FIFA nationality.

No.	Pos.	Nation	Player
—	MF	ALG	Abdessamed Bounoua (to (Algeria) JS Kabylie)
—	DF	ALG	Zakaria Khali (to (Algeria) CR Belouizdad)
—	DF	ALG	Mohamed Lagraâ (to (Algeria) MC Oran)
—	MF	ALG	Larbi Tabti (to (Algeria) CR Belouizdad)
—	FW	ALG	Mourad Benayad (to (Algeria) CA Bordj Bou Arreridj)
—	MF	ALG	Boualem Mesmoudi (to (Algeria) MC Oran)
—	GK	ALG	Sofiane Khedairia (to (Algeria) ES Sétif)
—	FW	ALG	Mohamed Seguer (to (Algeria) RC Relizane)
—	GK	ALG	Athmane Toual (to (Algeria) MC Alger)

== Ligue Professionnelle 2 ==
=== DRB Tadjenanet ===
In: Note: Flags indicate national team as defined under FIFA eligibility rules; some limited exceptions apply. Players may hold more than one non-FIFA nationality.

No.	Pos.	Nation	Player

Out: Note: Flags indicate national team as defined under FIFA eligibility rules; some limited exceptions apply. Players may hold more than one non-FIFA nationality.

No.	Pos.	Nation	Player
—	FW	ALG	Billel Bensaha (to (Tunisia) Espérance ST)
