= 2019–20 USM Alger season =

USM Alger
2019–20 season
- Owner: ETRHB Haddad (until 2 March 2020); Groupe SERPORT (from 2 March 2020)
- President: Boualem Chendri (until 2 March 2020); Achour Djelloul (from 2 March 2020)
- Head coach: Billel Dziri (from 24 June 2019) (until 26 February 2020); Farid Zemiti (c) (from 27 February 2020) (until 2 March 2020); Mounir Zeghdoud (from 3 March 2020)
- Stadium: Omar Hamadi Stadium
- Ligue 1: 6th
- Algerian Cup: Round of 32
- Champions League: Group Stage
- Top goalscorer: League: Abdelkrim Zouari (7 goals); All: Aymen Mahious (12 goals)
- Biggest win: USM Alger 6–1 USM Khenchela
- Biggest defeat: MC Oran 4–0 USM Alger
Home colours	Away colours	Third colours

In the 2019–20 season, USM Alger competed in the Ligue 1 for the 42nd season, as well as the Algerian Cup. It was their 25th consecutive season in the top flight of Algerian football. They also competed in the Champions League, and the Algerian Cup.

During the campaign, the club were plagued by major financial problems after the club owner Ali Haddad was jailed, which froze the official account of the club, leaving them unable to pay the salaries of the players, technical staff and other workers.

On March 15, 2020, the Ligue de Football Professionnel (LFP) decided to halt the season due to the COVID-19 pandemic in Algeria. On July 29, 2020, the LFP declared that season is over and CR Belouizdad to be the champion, the promotion of four teams from the League 2, and scraping the relegation for the current season.

== Summary ==
On June 2, 2019, it was announced on Echourouk TV that the Haddad family was selling its shares in SSPA USMA, of which it held 92%.

The club lost several key players including Abderrahmane Meziane, who moved to Al Ain. and Raouf Benguit to Espérance ST. also Farouk Chafaï Mokhtar Benmoussa and Prince Ibara to K Beerschot. On 26 July, USM Alger squad went to Tunisia for a ten-day internship The cost was paid by a friend from Tunisia because of the continued freezing of their financial account. On 4 August, Al-Hayat Petroleum Company decided to pay the cost of travel to Niger in order to play the preliminary round of the CAF Champions League, the same company that wants to buy the majority of the shares of the club. On 4 September, The players of USM Alger decided to go on strike to protest difficult financial situation They stressed that this decision has nothing to do with the administration, the fans or the club itself. It is a protest movement against the state of the USM Alger and the delay in resolving the crisis, As a reminder, the USM Alger players have not received their salaries for 6 months, while the new ones have not received any salary since joining the club.

On 13 October, The players decided to boycott the training and official matches because they have not been paid for five months, two days after Amine Tirmane club's communication officer He submitted his resignation on the channel Dzaïr TV, a day later a fan paid the amount of 500,000 dinars per player reward win against Gor Mahia and AS Aïn M'lila, The players then decide to return to training and play CA Bordj Bou Arreridj match on October 23. After a protest in front of the headquarters of the Ministry of Youth and Sports against the difficult situation, Minister Raouf Salim Bernaoui said to supporters of the club They have to be patient.

On 19 October, Nearly 5,000 supporters of USM Alger went out to The headquarters of the Wilaya of Algiers to protest against the club's difficult financial situation and free it from ETRHB Haddad Company. A day after Mounir D'bichi said to France 24 that Al-Hayat Petroleum is a subsidiary of ETRHB Haddad which also said that the team's debts amount to 1,020,000,000 DA about 8 million euros. D'bichi said ETRHB Haddad had provided 400 billion centimes since its arrival about 23 million euros. On 22 October, Oussama Chita resumed training with his teammates after a long absence due to a serious injury contracted by the Algerian international last season at the knee.

On October 29, 2019, The leaders of USM Algiers have announced in a statement that the sponsorship deal with Kia Al Djazair will be terminated amicably and the club will recover all outstanding debts that are valued at nearly 20 billion centimes (1.4 million €) In addition, the contract with Ifri will not be renewed either by decision of the company. On November 5, the administration of USM Alger signed Sponsor contract with Serport specialized in port services for 16 billion centimes about 1.2 million euros. The administration of USM Alger to regain its right in the Darby case, appealed the arbitration decision issued by the Algerian Court for the settlement of sports disputes in case No. 92/19 between Union sportive de la médina d'Alger against the Algerian Football Federation and the Professional Football Association. This was the receipt of the receipt of the appeal from the Court of Arbitration for Sport in Lausanne on 8 January 2020 and the team paid the costs of registering the case with an amount of one thousand euros (€1000 ) on the morning of 9 January.

== Squad list ==
Players and squad numbers last updated on 1 May 2020.
Note: Flags indicate national team as has been defined under FIFA eligibility rules. Players may hold more than one non-FIFA nationality.

No.	Name	Nat.	Position	Date of Birth (Age)	Signed from	Signed in	Contract ends	Notes	Apps	Goals
Goalkeepers
1	Lamine Zemmamouche	(Algeria)	GK	19 March 1985 (aged 34)	(Algeria) MC Alger	2012	2020	Captain	379	1
16	Ismaïl Mansouri	(Algeria)	GK	7 January 1988 (aged 31)	(Algeria) MO Béjaïa	2008	2020	Loan return	79	0
30	Abdelmoumen Sifour	(Algeria)	GK	3 March 1998 (aged 21)	(Algeria) Reserve team	2019	2022		1	0
Defenders
3	Abderrahim Hamra	(Algeria)	CB	21 July 1997 (aged 22)	(Algeria) Reserve team	2016	2020		32	1
4	Mustapha Kheiraoui	(Algeria)	CB	7 October 1995 (aged 24)	(Algeria) A Bou Saada	2019	2022		22	0
6	Lyes Oukkal	(Algeria)	CB	5 November 1991 (aged 28)	(Algeria) NA Hussein Dey	2019	2021		14	0
19	Redouane Cherifi	(Algeria)	LB	22 February 1993 (aged 26)	(Algeria) USM Bel-Abbès	2017	2021		89	2
22	Mohamed Rabie Meftah	(Algeria)	RB	5 May 1985 (aged 34)	(Algeria) JSM Béjaïa	2011	2020	3rd captain	258	49
27	Mohamed Tiboutine	(Algeria)	RB	28 February 1991 (aged 28)	(Algeria) JS Saoura	2019	2021		9	0
28	Hicham Belkaroui	(Algeria)	CB	24 August 1990 (aged 29)	(Saudi Arabia) Al-Raed	2019	2021		6	0
42	Adam Alilet	(Algeria)	CB	17 January 1999 (aged 20)	(Algeria) Reserve team	2019	2023		9	0
57	Anis Khemaissia	(Algeria)	LB	27 January 1999 (aged 20)	(Algeria) USM Annaba	2019	2022		15	1
Midfielders
2	Oussama Chita	(Algeria)	DM	31 October 1996 (aged 23)	(Algeria) MC Alger	2017	2021		64	2
7	Ilyes Yaiche	(Algeria)	AM / LW	27 October 1997 (aged 22)	(Algeria) NA Hussein Dey	2016	2022	Loan return	21	0
8	Kamel Belarbi	(Algeria)	DM	11 April 1997 (aged 22)	(Algeria) USM El Harrach	2018	2022		23	0
10	Muaid Ellafi	(Libya)	AM / LW	7 March 1996 (aged 23)	(Saudi Arabia) Al-Shabab	2018	2021		40	7
17	Taher Benkhelifa	(Algeria)	DM	10 June 1994 (aged 25)	(Algeria) Paradou AC	2019	2020	Loan	26	1
23	Hamza Koudri	(Algeria)	DM	15 December 1987 (aged 32)	(Algeria) MC Alger	2012	2020	Vice-captain	242	8
25	Mohamed Reda Boumechra	(Algeria)	DM	3 June 1997 (aged 22)	(Algeria) USM El Harrach	2019	2020	Loan return	23	2
26	Billel Benhammouda	(Algeria)	AM	28 August 1997 (aged 22)	(Algeria) USMM Hadjout	2016	2023		43	3
Forwards
7	Zakaria Haddouche	(Algeria)	LW	19 August 1993 (aged 26)	(Algeria) MC Alger	2019	2021		9	0
9	Zakaria Benchaâ	(Algeria)	ST	11 January 1997 (aged 22)	(Algeria) MC Oran	2018	2021		27	7
11	Abdelkrim Zouari	(Algeria)	RW	14 July 1989 (aged 30)	(Algeria) USM Bel Abbès	2018	2021		41	12
15	Oualid Ardji	(Algeria)	LW / LB	7 September 1995 (aged 24)	(Algeria) NA Hussein Dey	2016	2021	Loan return	77	6
18	Aymen Mahious	(Algeria)	ST	15 September 1997 (aged 22)	(Algeria) AS Aïn M'lila	2018	2021	Loan return	48	14
20	Adem Redjehimi	(Algeria)	LW	20 February 1995 (aged 24)	(Italy) Afro Napoli United	2019	2021		6	1

== Transfers ==
=== In ===
Date	Pos	Player	From club	Transfer fee	Source
9 June 2019	LB	(Algeria) Anis Khemaissia	USM Annaba	Free transfer	
22 June 2019	CB	(Algeria) Lyes Oukkal	NA Hussein Dey	Free transfer	
30 June 2019	RB	(Algeria) Mehdi Benchikhoune	WA Tlemcen	Loan Return	
30 June 2019	ST	(Algeria) Aymen Mahious	AS Aïn M'lila	Loan Return	
1 July 2019	DM	(Algeria) Taher Benkhelifa	Paradou AC	Loan for one year	
2 July 2019	LW	(Algeria) Zakaria Haddouche	MC Alger	Free transfer	
6 July 2019	FW	(Algeria) Karim Louanchi	Reserve team	Free transfer	
8 July 2019	CB	(Algeria) Mustapha Kheiraoui	Amal Bou Saâda	Free transfer	
13 July 2019	RB	(Algeria) Mohamed Tiboutine	JS Saoura	Free transfer	
30 July 2019	CB	(Algeria) Adam Alilet	Reserve team	Free transfer	
31 July 2019	CB	(Algeria) Hicham Belkaroui	(Saudi Arabia) Al-Raed	Free transfer	
31 July 2019	LW	(Algeria) Adem Redjehimi	(Italy) Afro Napoli United	Free transfer	
12 January 2020	AM / LW	(Algeria) Ilyes Yaiche	NA Hussein Dey	Loan Return	

=== Out ===
Date	Pos	Player	To club	Transfer fee	Source
7 June 2019	AM / FW	(Algeria) Rafik Bouderbal	(France) AS Lyon-Duchère	Free transfer	
13 June 2019	ST	(Algeria) Abderrahmane Meziane	(United Arab Emirates) Al Ain	Free transfer	
18 June 2019	MF	(Algeria) Ammar El Orfi	JS Kabylie	Free transfer	
30 June 2019	CB	(Algeria) Mohamed Benyahia	Unattached (Note: Benyahia joined ES Sétif on 26 December 2019.)	Free transfer (Released)	
30 June 2019	DM	(Algeria) Raouf Benguit	Paradou AC	Loan Return	
15 July 2019	CB	(Algeria) Farouk Chafaï	MC Alger	Free transfer	
22 July 2019	FW	(Algeria) Mohamed Amine Hamia	MC Oran	Free transfer (Released)	
24 July 2019	FW	(Republic of the Congo) Prince Ibara	(Belgium) K Beerschot	Free transfer (Released)	
1 August 2019	CB	(Algeria) Mokhtar Benmoussa	USM Bel Abbès	Free transfer	
6 August 2019	GK	(Algeria) Mourad Berrefane	RC Relizane	Free transfer	
2 September 2019	MF	(Algeria) Mohammed Benkhemassa	(Spain) Málaga CF	50,000 €	
31 December 2019	FW	(Algeria) Zakaria Haddouche	Unattached (Note: Haddouche joined Khaleej FC on 31 January 2020.)	Free transfer (Released)	
30 January 2020	FW	(Algeria) Zakaria Benchaâ	(Tunisia) CS Sfaxien	Loan for six months	

== Pre-season and friendlies ==
17 July 2019 Friendly	USM Alger	Cancelled (Note: USM Alger against Olympique de Médéa stopped after 15 minutes after fans stormed the stadium.)	Olympique de Médéa	Bologhine
18:00				Stadium: Omar Hamadi Stadium

28 July 2019 Friendly	USM Alger	1–1	(Saudi Arabia) Al-Bukayriyah	Tunis, Tunisia
17:00	Benchaâ 4'	Report	Al-Reemi 18'	Stadium: Stade Chedli Zouiten
Note: Lineup for USM Alger; First half - Mansouri - Meftah - Cherifi - Oukal - Kheiraoui - Koudri - Benkhlifa - Zouari - Ardji - Boumechra - Benchaa; Second half -

31 July 2019 Friendly	USM Alger	2–0	(Saudi Arabia) Al-Qadsiah	Tunis, Tunisia
20:00	Benchaâ 24', 29'	Report		Stadium: Stade Chedli Zouiten
Note: Lineup for USM Alger - Zemmamouche, Meftah (Tiboutine 60') Cherifi (Khemaissia 68'), Oukal (Alilet 85'), Kheiraoui (Abdelaziz 85'), Koudri (Ellafi 65'), Benkhelifa, Benkhemassa, Ardji (Boumechra 75'), Zouari (Redjihimi), Benchaa

== Competitions ==
=== Overview ===
Competition	Record								Started round	Final position / round	First match	Last match
Competition	G	W	D	L	GF	GA	GD	Win %	Started round	Final position / round	First match	Last match
Ligue 1	21	9	5	7	25	22	+3	42.86	—N/a	6th	15 August 2019	14 March 2020
Algerian Cup	2	1	0	1	6	2	+4	50.00	Round of 64	Round of 32	5 January 2020	13 February 2020
Champions League	10	4	3	3	17	13	+4	40.00	Preliminary round	Group Stage	9 August 2019	1 February 2020
Total	33	14	8	11	48	37	+11	42.42				

Updated to match played 14 March 2020
Source: Competitions

=== Ligue 1 ===
==== League table ====
Pos	Team	Pld	W	D	L	GF	GA	GD	Pts	PPG	Qualification or relegation
4	JS Kabylie	22	10	6	6	27	18	+9	36	1.64	Qualification for Confederation Cup
5	CS Constantine	22	9	7	6	32	23	+9	34	1.55	
6	USM Alger	21	9	5	7	25	22	+3	32 (Note: USM Alger were deducted 3 points due to their withdrawal in their game against MC Alger. The decision has been appealed to the Court of Arbitration for Sport. On August 28, 2020, after postponing several times the final decision was made without appeal, which is to return the three points and repeat the match.)	1.52	
7	JS Saoura	22	9	6	7	19	18	+1	33	1.50	
8	AS Aïn M'lila	22	8	8	6	26	25	+1	32	1.45	

Updated to match(es) played on 15 March 2020. Source: dzfoot.com
Rules for classification: 1) points; 2) head-to-head points; 3) head-to-head goal difference; 4) goal difference; 5) total goals; 6) fairplay ranking; 7) playoff.

==== Results summary ====
Overall								Home						Away					
Pld	W	D	L	GF	GA	GD	Pts	W	D	L	GF	GA	GD	W	D	L	GF	GA	GD
21	9	5	7	25	22	+3	32	8	1	2	20	9	+11	1	4	5	5	13	−8

Last updated: 14 March 2020.
Source: Competitive matches

==== Results by round ====
Round	1	2	3	4	5	6	7	8	9	10	11	12	13	14	15	16	17	18	19	20	21	22	23	24	25	26	27	28	29	30
Ground	H	A	H	A	H	H	A	H	A	H	A	H	A	H	A	A	H	A	H	A	A	H	A	H	A	H	A	H	A	H
Result	W	D	W	C	W	W	L	W	W	D	L	W	D	W	L	L	L	D	L	L	D	W	C	C	C	C	C	C	C	C
Position	2	6	4	5	2	2	3	3	3	3	3	2	2	2	2	3	3	3	7	8	9	6	6	6	6	6	6	6	6	6

Updated to match(es) played on 14 March 2020. Source: Competitive matches
A = Away; H = Home; W = Win; D = Draw; L = Loss

==== Matches ====
On 29 July 2019, the Algerian Ligue Professionnelle 1 fixtures were announced.

15 August 2019 Round 1	USM Alger	2–1	ES Sétif	Bologhine
20:00	Benkhemassa (yellow card) 11'; Meftah (penalty missed) ?' 45+3'; Khemaissia 90+4' (yellow card) 90+5'	Soccerway report LFP report	Laribi (yellow card) 23'; Bouguelmouna 34' (penalty missed) 45' (yellow card) 83'; Saïdi (yellow card) 68'; Ghacha (yellow card) 72'	Stadium: Omar Hamadi Stadium; Attendance: 0 (close doors); Referee: Mustapha Ghorbal

19 August 2019 Round 2	CS Constantine	0–0	USM Alger	Constantine
21:00		Soccerway report LFP report	Zemmamouche (yellow card) 90+1'	Stadium: Stade Mohamed Hamlaoui; Referee: Mohamed Saïdi

1 September 2019 Round 3	USM Alger	3–2	AS Aïn M'lila	Bologhine
21:00	Koudri 44'; Zouari 53'; Ellafi (penalty missed) 64'; Redjehimi (yellow card) 81'; Meftah 88' (pen.) (yellow card) 88'	Soccerway report LFP report	Demane 4'; Ziad (yellow card) 21'; Si Ammar 54'; Bitam (yellow card) 58'; Bouhakkak (yellow card) 78'	Stadium: Omar Hamadi Stadium; Referee: Missoum Benabdellah

5 October 2019 Round 7	MC Oran	4–0	USM Alger	Oran
17:45	Fourloul 17'; Mansouri (yellow card) 28'; Meftah 43' (o.g.); Hamia (yellow card) 64'; Mazouzi (yellow card) 72'; Mellal 74'; Mesmoudi (yellow card) 87'; Mekkaoui (yellow card) 90+2'; Benhamou 90+5' (yellow card) 90+5'	Soccerway report LFP report	Kheiraoui (yellow card) 37'; Cherifi (yellow card) 55'; Mahious (yellow card) 87'	Stadium: Ahmed Zabana Stadium; Referee: Mehdi Abid Charef

Round 4	MC Alger	Cancelled	USM Alger	Algiers
				Stadium: Stade du 5 Juillet; Referee: Abderrezzak Arab

23 October 2019 Round 8	USM Alger	3–0	CA Bordj Bou Arreridj	Bologhine
17:00	Meftah 82' (pen.); Benchaâ (yellow card) 86' (goal) 88'; Benkhelifa (yellow card) 56' (goal) 90+1'	Soccerway report	Gadacha (yellow card) 51'; Arroussi (yellow card) 85'	Stadium: Omar Hamadi Stadium; Referee: Farouk Mial

30 October 2019 Round 9	NC Magra	1–2	USM Alger	Sétif
15:00	El Orfi (yellow card) 12'; Rahal (yellow card) 67'; Ziani 90+2'	Soccerway report LFP report	Koudri (yellow card) 36'; Zouari 66'; Mahious 71' (pen.) (yellow card) 72'	Stadium: Stade 8 Mai 1945; Referee: Malek Ait Ameur

4 November 2019 Round 5	USM Alger	4–1	JS Saoura	Bologhine
17:45	Meftah 13' (pen.) (yellow card) 52'; Mahious 74'; Ellafi 88' (pen.); Zouari 89'	Soccerway report LFP report	Hamidi 18'; Zaidi (yellow card) 58'; Lahmeri (yellow card) 62'	Stadium: Omar Hamadi Stadium; Referee: Mohamed Saïdi

9 November 2019 Round 10	USM Alger	0–0	NA Hussein Dey	Bologhine
17:45	Tiboutine (yellow card) 23'; Mahious (yellow card) 26'; Cherifi (penalty missed) 74'; Zouari (yellow card) 78'	Soccerway report LFP report	Ouadji (yellow card) 28'; Yaya (penalty missed) 90+3'	Stadium: Omar Hamadi Stadium; Referee: Abdelali Ibrir

23 November 2019 Round 11	US Biskra	1–0	USM Alger	Biskra
17:00	Guebli 31'; Adouane (yellow card) 70'; Dakhia (yellow card) 75'; Bouafia (yellow card) 90+3'	Soccerway report LFP report	Kheiraoui (yellow card) 14'; Zemmamouche (yellow card) 90+3'	Stadium: Stade du 18 Février; Attendance: 0 (close doors); Referee: Youcef Gamouh

16 December 2019 Round 14	USM Alger	1–0	CR Belouizdad	Bologhine
18:45	Benchaâ (yellow card) 59'; Meftah 77'	Soccerway report LFP report	Gasmi (yellow card) 15'	Stadium: Omar Hamadi Stadium; Referee: Said Aouina

21 December 2019 Round 15	USM Bel Abbès	1–0	USM Alger	Sidi Bel Abbès
18:45	Aichi (yellow card) 56'; Litt 87'	Soccerway report LFP report	Benkhelifa (yellow card) 37'	Stadium: Stade 24 Fevrier 1956; Referee: Redouane Necib

2 January 2020 Round 6	USM Alger	1–0	Paradou AC	Bologhine
18:45	Boumechra 24'; Dziri (yellow card) 31'; Hamra (red card) 70'; Meftah (yellow card) 89'	Soccerway report LFP report	Kadri (yellow card) 26'; Guenaoui (yellow card) 83'	Stadium: Omar Hamadi Stadium; Referee: Missoum Benabdellah

16 January 2020 Round 12	USM Alger	1–0	JS Kabylie	Bologhine
18:45	Mahious 30' (pen.); Meftah (yellow card) 66'	Soccerway report LFP report	Bencherifa (yellow card) 53'; Ait Abdessalem (yellow card) 89'	Stadium: Omar Hamadi Stadium; Referee: Abdelali Ibrir

20 January 2020 Round 13	ASO Chlef	0–0	USM Alger	Chlef
17:00	Arab (penalty missed) 65'; Belhaoua (yellow card) 73'	Soccerway report	Tiboutine (yellow card) 37'; Koudri (yellow card) 49'	Stadium: Stade Mohamed Boumezrag; Referee: Abderrezzak Arab

4 February 2020 Round 16	ES Sétif	3–1	USM Alger	Sétif
17:00	Laribi 45+1'; Ghacha 56'; Kendoussi 58'	Soccerway report	Zouari 90+4'	Stadium: Stade 8 Mai 1945; Referee: Nabil Boukhalfa

8 February 2020 Round 17	USM Alger	1–3	CS Constantine	Bologhine
16:00	Zouari (yellow card) 18'; Koudri (yellow card) 32'; Ardji (yellow card) 70'; Mahious 85' (pen.)	Soccerway report LFP report	Yettou (yellow card) 38'; Belkacemi 49', 90'; Alharaish 90+1'	Stadium: Omar Hamadi Stadium; Attendance: 0 (close doors); Referee: Mustapha Ghorbal

17 February 2020 Round 18	AS Aïn M'lila	1–1	USM Alger	Aïn M'lila
15:00	Ibouzidène (yellow card) 64'; Ziad 71'; Siam (yellow card) 82'	Soccerway report LFP report	Benhammouda (yellow card) 40'; Mahious (yellow card) 50'; Hamra 53'	Stadium: Touhami Zoubir Khelifi Stadium; Referee: Redouane Necib

24 February 2020 Round 19	USM Alger	0–1	MC Alger	Algiers
17:45	Meftah (yellow card) 12'	Soccerway report LFP report	Rebiai (yellow card) 23'; Frioui 61' (yellow card) 61'	Stadium: Stade du 5 Juillet; Referee: Youcef Gamouh

29 February 2020 Round 20	JS Saoura	1–0	USM Alger	Béchar
18:00	Lahmeri 45+1' (pen.); Yadroudj (yellow card) 80'	Soccerway report LFP report	Oukkal (yellow card) 10' (yellow-red card) 45'; Meftah (yellow card) 14'; Benkhelifa (yellow card) 45'; Benhammouda (yellow card) 46'; Belkaroui (yellow card) 89'	Stadium: Stade 20 Août 1955; Referee: Mustapha Bessiri

7 March 2020 Round 21	Paradou AC	1–1	USM Alger	Algiers
16:00	Douar (yellow card) 60'; Zorgane (yellow card) 78'; Bouchina (yellow card) 86'; Ghorab (yellow card) 90'; Bouzok 90+5'	Soccerway report LFP report	Zouari (yellow card) 45+3' (goal) 82'; Mahious (yellow card) 90+2'	Stadium: Stade du 5 Juillet; Referee: Mohamed Saïdi

14 March 2020 Round 22	USM Alger	4–1	MC Oran	Bologhine
16:00	Zouari 22', 48'; Koudri (yellow card) 25'; Boumechra (yellow card) 41'; Benhammouda 53', 61'	Soccerway report [ LFP report]	Lagraâ (yellow card) 20'; Benhamou 45+1'; Feghloul (yellow card) 90+1'	Stadium: Omar Hamadi Stadium; Attendance: 0 (close doors); Referee: Abderrezzak Arab
Note: due to coronavirus pandemic, Ministry of Health, Population and Hospital Reform decided to be all matches played behind closed doors.

Round 23	CA Bordj Bou Arreridj	Cancelled	USM Alger	Bordj Bou Arréridj
				Stadium: Stade 20 Août 1955

Round 24	USM Alger	Cancelled	NC Magra	Bologhine
				Stadium: Omar Hamadi Stadium

Round 25	NA Hussein Dey	Cancelled	USM Alger	Belouizdad
				Stadium: Stade 20 Août 1955

Round 26	USM Alger	Cancelled	US Biskra	Bologhine
				Stadium: Omar Hamadi Stadium

Round 27	JS Kabylie	Cancelled	USM Alger	Tizi Ouzou
				Stadium: Stade 1er Novembre 1954

Round 28	USM Alger	Cancelled	ASO Chlef	Bologhine
				Stadium: Omar Hamadi Stadium

Round 29	CR Belouizdad	Cancelled	USM Alger	Belouizdad
				Stadium: Stade 20 Août 1955

Round 30	USM Alger	Cancelled	USM Bel Abbès	Bologhine
				Stadium: Omar Hamadi Stadium

=== Algerian Cup ===
5 January 2020 Round of 64	USM Alger	6–1	USM Khenchela	Bologhine
16:00	Mahious 8' (pen.), 43', 67'; Ardji (yellow card) 17' (goal) 54'; Benhammouda 22'; Koudri (yellow card) 65'; Redjehimi 90+2'		Krioui 26'; Hoggas (yellow card) 65'	Stadium: Omar Hamadi Stadium; Referee: Mohamed Saïdi
Note: Lineup for USM Alger - Mansouri, Belkaroui, Tiboutine, Oukkal, Khemaissia, Benhammouda (Chita, 66'), Koudri, Boumechra (Redjehimi, 55'), Mahious (Benchaâ, 73'), Belarbi, Ardji.

13 February 2020 Round of 32	ASM Oran	1–0	USM Alger	Oran
14:00	Belaribi 52' (yellow card) 52'; Ali Larbi (yellow card) 89'	Report	Koudri (yellow card) 33'; Benhammouda (yellow card) 86'	Stadium: Habib Bouakeul Stadium; Referee: Abdelmoumen Touabti
Note: Lineup for USM Alger - Zemmamouche, Cherifi, Khemaissia, Alilet, Meftah, Chita (Benhammouda, 63'), Koudri, Benkhelifa, Ellafi (Ardji, 63'), Yaiche (Boumechra, 75'), Mahious.

=== Champions League ===
==== Qualifying rounds ====
===== First round =====
9 August 2019 First leg	AS Sonidep (Niger)	1–2	(Algeria) USM Alger	Niamey, Niger
16:30 UTC+1	Sabo 14' (pen.)	Report	Benchaâ 51', 69'	Stadium: Stade Général Seyni Kountché; Referee: Salisu Basheer (Nigeria)
Note: Lineup for USM Alger - Zemmamouche - Oukkal, Cherifi, Kheiraoui, Meftah - Koudri, Belarbi, Ellafi - Adji, Zouari, Benchaa (Mahious 75')

25 August 2019 Second leg	USM Alger (Algeria)	3–1 (5–2 agg.)	(Niger) AS Sonidep	Algiers, Algeria
20:45 UTC+1	Mahious 27'; Ellafi 35' (pen.); Hamra (yellow card) 48'; Ardji 64'	Report	Boubacar (yellow card) 32'; Kheiraoui 59' (o.g.); Lawali (yellow card) 67'	Stadium: Stade du 5 Juillet; Referee: Issa Sy (Senegal)
Note: Lineup for USM Alger - Zemmamouche - Khemaissia, Hamra, Kheiraoui, Tiboutine - Koudri (Boumechra, 75'), Belarbi, Ellafi - Adji (Cherifi, 83'), Mahious (Benchaa, 63'), Benhamouda

===== Second round =====
15 September 2019 First leg	USM Alger (Algeria)	4–1	(Kenya) Gor Mahia	Blida, Algeria (Note: USM Alger played their home match against Gor Mahia at Mustapha Tchaker Stadium, Blida, instead of their regular stadium July 5, 1962 Stadium, Algiers.)
20:45 UTC+1	Meftah 16', 45+1' (pen.); Benchaâ 45+2', 75'; Koudri (yellow card) 47'	Report	Wellington (yellow card) 10'; Muguna 56' (pen.); Ambundo (yellow card) 64'; Onyango (yellow card) 74'	Stadium: Mustapha Tchaker Stadium; Referee: Bakary Gassama (Gambia)
Note: Lineup for USM Alger - Mansouri - Meftah, Kheiraoui, Hamra, Cherifi - Benkhelifa, Koudri, Ellafi - Zouari (Haddouche 66'), Benchaa (Mahious 80'), Ardji (Benhammouda 76')

29 September 2019 Second leg	Gor Mahia (Kenya)	0–2 (1–6 agg.)	(Algeria) USM Alger	Nairobi, Kenya
16:00 UTC+3		Report	Mahious 4', 16'; Benkhelifa (yellow card) 31'	Stadium: Moi International Sports Centre; Referee: Sidi Alioum (Cameroon)
Note: Lineup for USM Alger - Mansouri - Meftah, Kheiraoui, Hamra, Cherifi - Benkhelifa (Khemaissia, 87'), Belarbi, Ellafi - Zouari, Mahious (Haddouche, 63'), Ardji (Alilet, 76')

==== Group stage ====
Pos	Team	Pld	W	D	L	GF	GA	GD	Pts	Qualification	MSD	WAC	PET	USM
1	(South Africa) Mamelodi Sundowns	6	4	2	0	9	3	+6	14	Advance to knockout stage	—	1–0	3–0	2–1
2	(Morocco) Wydad AC	6	2	3	1	10	6	+4	9	Advance to knockout stage	0–0	—	4–1	3–1
3	(Angola) Petro de Luanda	6	0	4	2	8	14	−6	4		2–2	2–2	—	1–1
4	(Algeria) USM Alger	6	0	3	3	6	10	−4	3		0–1	1–1	2–2	—

Source: CAF

30 November 2019 1	USM Alger (Algeria)	1–1	(Morocco) Wydad Casablanca	Blida, Algeria (Note: USM Alger play their home matches instead of their regular home stadium Omar Hamadi Stadium, Algiers, which did not meet CAF requirements.)
17:00 UTC+1	Zouari 5'; Ellafi (yellow card) 61'	Soccerway Report	Jabrane (yellow card) 78'; El Amloud (yellow card) 80'; Aouk 89'	Stadium: Mustapha Tchaker Stadium; Referee: Bernard Camille (Seychelles)

7 December 2019 2	Petro de Luanda (Angola)	1–1	(Algeria) USM Alger	Luanda, Angola
14:00 UTC+1	Toni 64'	Soccerway Report	Mansouri (yellow card) 49'; Benchaâ 54' (yellow card) 90+1'; Kheiraoui (yellow card) 59'; Meftah (yellow card) 76'	Stadium: Estádio 11 de Novembro; Referee: Bamlak Tessema Weyesa (Ethiopia)

28 December 2019 3	USM Alger (Algeria)	0–1	(South Africa) Mamelodi Sundowns	Blida, Algeria
17:00 UTC+1	Hamra (yellow card) 42'; Koudri (yellow card) 45+1'	Soccerway Report	Kekana (yellow card) 23' (goal) 59'; Lakay (yellow card) 77'	Stadium: Mustapha Tchaker Stadium; Referee: Beida Dahane (Mauritania)

11 January 2020 4	Mamelodi Sundowns (South Africa)	2–1	(Algeria) USM Alger	Pretoria, South Africa
15:00 UTC+2	Morena 36'; Vilakazi 45+1'	Soccerway Report	Mahious 44'; Ardji (yellow card) 66'; Boumechra (yellow card) 70'; Meftah (yellow card) 79' (penalty missed) 86'	Stadium: Loftus Versfeld Stadium; Referee: Mahmoud El Banna (Egypt)

24 January 2020 5	Wydad Casablanca (Morocco)	3–1	(Algeria) USM Alger	Casablanca, Morocco
20:00 UTC+1	El Karti 7'; Aouk 24'; Kasengu 45+1'; Tagnaouti (yellow card) 75'	Soccerway Report	Hamra (yellow card) 44'; Meftah 79'	Stadium: Stade Mohammed V Referee: Eric Otogo-Castane (Gabon)

1 February 2020 6	USM Alger (Algeria)	2–2	(Angola) Petro de Luanda	Belouizdad, Algeria
14:00 UTC+1	Mahious 33'; Boumechra (yellow card) 53'; Ardji 70'	Soccerway Report	Wilson (yellow card) 68'; Picas 80'; Toni 81'	Stadium: Stade 20 Août 1955; Referee: Sadok Selmi (Tunisia)

== Squad information ==
=== Appearances and goals ===
No.	Pos	Player	Nat	Ligue 1			Algerian Cup			Champions League			Total		
No.	Pos	Player	Nat	App	St	G	App	St	G	App	St	G	App	St	G
Goalkeepers
1	GK	Lamine Zemmamouche	(Algeria)	15	15	0	1	1	0	6	6	0	22	22	0
16	GK	Ismaïl Mansouri	(Algeria)	5	5	0	1	1	0	4	4	0	10	10	0
30	GK	Abdelmoumen Sifour (Note: Player from USM Alger Reserve)	(Algeria)	1	1	0	0	0	0	0	0	0	1	1	0
Defenders
3	CB	Abderrahime Hamra	(Algeria)	16	16	1	1	1	0	8	8	0	25	25	1
4	CB	Mustapha Kheiraoui	(Algeria)	14	14	0	0	0	0	8	8	0	22	22	0
6	CB	Lyes Oukkal	(Algeria)	9	8	0	1	1	0	4	4	0	14	13	0
19	LB	Redouane Cherifi	(Algeria)	19	19	0	1	1	0	9	8	0	29	28	0
22	RB	Mohamed Rabie Meftah	(Algeria)	16	15	5	1	1	0	9	9	3	26	25	8
27	RB	Mohamed Tiboutine	(Algeria)	6	5	0	1	1	0	2	1	0	9	7	0
28	CB	Hicham Belkaroui	(Algeria)	4	2	0	1	1	0	1	1	0	6	4	0
42	CB	Adam Alilet	(Algeria)	6	6	0	1	1	0	2	1	0	9	8	0
57	LB	Anis Khemaissia	(Algeria)	7	1	1	2	2	0	6	2	0	15	5	1
Midfielders
2	DM	Oussama Chita	(Algeria)	6	3	0	2	1	0	2	1	0	10	5	0
7	AM / LW	Ilyes Yaiche	(Algeria)	5	2	0	1	1	0	0	0	0	6	3	0
8	DM	Kamel Belarbi	(Algeria)	7	5	0	1	1	0	6	4	0	14	10	0
10	AM / LW	Muaid Ellafi	(Libya)	18	11	1	1	1	0	6	6	1	25	18	2
17	DM	Taher Benkhelifa	(Algeria)	18	17	1	1	1	0	7	7	0	26	25	1
23	DM	Hamza Koudri	(Algeria)	17	17	1	2	2	0	8	8	0	27	27	1
~~24~~	DM	Mohammed Benkhemassa (Note: Player transferred out during the season)	(Algeria)	1	1	0	0	0	0	0	0	0	1	1	0
25	DM	Mohamed Reda Boumechra	(Algeria)	9	8	1	2	1	0	4	1	0	15	10	1
26	AM	Billel Benhammouda	(Algeria)	14	9	2	2	1	1	8	4	0	24	14	3
Forwards
~~7~~	LW	Zakaria Haddouche	(Algeria)	6	5	0	0	0	0	3	1	0	9	6	0
~~9~~	ST	Zakaria Benchaâ	(Algeria)	12	7	1	1	0	0	7	6	5	20	13	6
11	RW	Abdelkrim Zouari	(Algeria)	20	17	7	0	0	0	7	7	1	27	24	8
15	LW / LB	Oualid Ardji	(Algeria)	14	9	0	2	1	1	8	7	2	24	17	3
18	ST	Aymen Mahious	(Algeria)	20	13	4	2	2	3	10	5	5	32	20	12
20	LW	Adem Redjehimi	(Algeria)	3	0	0	1	0	1	2	1	0	6	1	1
Total				21		25	2		6	10		17	33		48

Last updated: 17 June 2022
Source: soccerway.com

=== Disciplinary record ===
No.	Pos.	Player	Ligue 1			Algerian Cup			Champions League			Total		
No.	Pos.	Player	Yellow card	(yellow card) (yellow-red card)	Red card	Yellow card	(yellow card) (yellow-red card)	Red card	Yellow card	(yellow card) (yellow-red card)	Red card	Yellow card	(yellow card) (yellow-red card)	Red card
1	GK	(Algeria) Mohamed Lamine Zemmamouche	2	0	0	0	0	0	0	0	0	2	0	0
16	GK	(Algeria) Ismaïl Mansouri	0	0	0	0	0	0	1	0	0	1	0	0
3	DF	(Algeria) Abderrahime Hamra	0	0	1	0	0	0	3	0	0	3	0	1
4	DF	(Algeria) Mustapha Kheiraoui	2	0	0	0	0	0	2	0	0	4	0	0
6	DF	(Algeria) Lyes Oukkal	1	1	0	0	0	0	0	0	0	1	1	0
19	DF	(Algeria) Redouane Cherifi	1	0	0	0	0	0	0	0	0	1	0	0
22	DF	(Algeria) Mohamed Rabie Meftah	6	0	0	0	0	0	2	0	0	8	0	0
27	DF	(Algeria) Mohamed Tiboutine	2	0	0	0	0	0	0	0	0	2	0	0
28	DF	(Algeria) Hicham Belkaroui	1	0	0	0	0	0	0	0	0	1	0	0
57	DF	(Algeria) Anis Khemaissia	1	0	0	0	0	0	0	0	0	1	0	0
7	MF	(Algeria) Ilyes Yaiche	1	0	0	0	0	0	0	0	0	1	0	0
10	MF	(Libya) Muaid Ellafi	0	0	0	0	0	0	1	0	0	1	0	0
17	MF	(Algeria) Taher Benkhelifa	3	0	0	0	0	0	1	0	0	4	0	0
23	MF	(Algeria) Hamza Koudri	4	0	0	2	0	0	2	0	0	8	0	0
~~24~~	MF	(Algeria) Mohammed Benkhemassa	1	0	0	0	0	0	0	0	0	1	0	0
25	MF	(Algeria) Mohamed Reda Boumechra	1	0	0	0	0	0	2	0	0	3	0	0
26	MF	(Algeria) Billel Benhammouda	2	0	0	1	0	0	0	0	0	3	0	0
~~9~~	FW	(Algeria) Zakaria Benchaâ	2	0	0	0	0	0	2	0	0	4	0	0
11	FW	(Algeria) Abdelkrim Zouari	3	0	0	0	0	0	0	0	0	3	0	0
15	FW	(Algeria) Oualid Ardji	1	0	0	1	0	0	1	0	0	3	0	0
18	FW	(Algeria) Aymen Mahious	5	0	0	0	0	0	0	0	0	5	0	0
20	FW	(Algeria) Adem Redjehimi	1	0	0	0	0	0	0	0	0	1	0	0
Total			39	1	1	4	0	0	17	0	0	60	1	1

=== Goalscorers ===
Includes all competitive matches. The list is sorted alphabetically by surname when total goals are equal.

No.	Nat.	Player	Pos.	L 1	AC	CL 1	TOTAL
18	(Algeria)	Aymen Mahious	FW	4	3	5	12
11	(Algeria)	Abdelkrim Zouari	FW	7	0	1	8
22	(Algeria)	Mohamed Rabie Meftah	DF	5	0	3	8
9	(Algeria)	Zakaria Benchaâ	FW	1	0	5	6
26	(Algeria)	Billel Benhammouda	MF	2	1	0	3
15	(Algeria)	Oualid Ardji	MF	0	1	2	3
10	(Libya)	Muaid Ellafi	MF	1	0	1	2
25	(Algeria)	Mohamed Reda Boumechra	MF	1	0	0	1
3	(Algeria)	Abderrahime Hamra	DF	1	0	0	1
23	(Algeria)	Hamza Koudri	MF	1	0	0	1
57	(Algeria)	Anis Khemaissia	DF	1	0	0	1
17	(Algeria)	Taher Benkhelifa	MF	1	0	0	1
20	(Algeria)	Adem Redjehimi	FW	0	1	0	1
Own Goals				0	0	0	0
Totals				25	6	17	47

=== Penalties ===
Date	Nation	Name	Opposition	Scored?
15 August 2019	(Algeria)	Mohamed Rabie Meftah	ES Sétif	Penalty missed
25 August 2019	(Libya)	Muaid Ellafi	AS Sonidep	✓
1 September 2019	(Libya)	Muaid Ellafi	AS Aïn M'lila	Penalty missed
1 September 2019	(Algeria)	Mohamed Rabie Meftah	AS Aïn M'lila	✓
15 September 2019	(Algeria)	Mohamed Rabie Meftah	Gor Mahia	✓
23 October 2019	(Algeria)	Mohamed Rabie Meftah	CA Bordj Bou Arreridj	✓
30 October 2019	(Algeria)	Aymen Mahious	NC Magra	✓
4 November 2019	(Algeria)	Mohamed Rabie Meftah	JS Saoura	✓
4 November 2019	(Libya)	Muaid Ellafi	JS Saoura	✓
9 November 2019	(Algeria)	Redouane Cherifi	NA Hussein Dey	Penalty missed
5 January 2020	(Algeria)	Aymen Mahious	USM Khenchela	✓
11 January 2020	(Algeria)	Mohamed Rabie Meftah	Mamelodi Sundowns	Penalty missed
16 January 2020	(Algeria)	Aymen Mahious	JS Kabylie	✓
8 February 2020	(Algeria)	Aymen Mahious	CS Constantine	✓

=== Clean sheets ===
Includes all competitive matches.

No.	Nat	Name	L 1	AC	CL 1	Total
1	(Algeria)	Lamine Zemmamouche	7	0	0	7
16	(Algeria)	Ismaïl Mansouri	0	0	1	1
30	(Algeria)	Abdelmoumen Sifour	0	0	0	0
		TOTALS	7	0	1	8

=== Hat-tricks ===
Player	Against	Result	Date	Competition	Ref
(Algeria) Aymen Mahious	USM Khenchela	6–1 (H)	5 January 2020	Algerian Cup	

(H) – Home; (A) – Away
