= 2020–21 USM Bel Abbès season =

USM Bel Abbès
2020–21 season
- President: Abdelghani El Hannani
- Head coach: Liamine Bougherara (from 3 October 2020) (until 6 December 2020); El Hachmi Benkhadda (c) (from 6 December 2020) (until 31 January 2021); Moez Bouakaz (from 31 January 2021)
- Stadium: Stade 24 Fevrier 1956
- Ligue 1: Pre-season
- League Cup: Round of 16
- Highest home attendance: 0 (Note: no one can attend games due to the COVID-19 pandemic)
- Lowest home attendance: 0 (Note: no one can attend games due to the COVID-19 pandemic)
- Average home league attendance: 0 (Note: no one can attend games due to the COVID-19 pandemic)

In the 2020–21 season, USM Bel Abbès is competing in the Ligue 1 for the 26th season, as well as the Algerian Cup. It is their 5th consecutive season in the top flight of Algerian football.

== Squad list ==
Players and squad numbers last updated on 15 November 2020.
Note: Flags indicate national team as has been defined under FIFA eligibility rules. Players may hold more than one non-FIFA nationality.

No.	Nat.	Position	Name	Date of Birth (Age)	Signed from
Goalkeepers
1	(Algeria)	GK	Abdelkader Zarat Belmokhtar	28 August 1995 (aged 25)	(Algeria) Youth system
16	(Algeria)	GK	Abdelkader Morcely	7 September 1995 (aged 25)	(Algeria) MC Alger
Defenders
2	(Algeria)	RB	Abdelhak Sailaa	1 July 1996 (aged 24)	(Algeria) MC Alger
3	(Algeria)		Abbes Noureddine Haddou	11 July 1999 (aged 21)	(Algeria) Youth system
4	(Algeria)	LB	Nasreddine Benlebna	9 May 1995 (aged 25)	(Algeria) GC Mascara
5	(Algeria)	CB	Mohammed Hamza	1 January 1995 (aged 26)	(Algeria) ES Mostaganem
13	(Algeria)		Mohammed Yassine Bounoua	2 May 1999 (aged 21)	(Algeria) Youth system
15	(Algeria)		Ishak Ben Hassaini	29 May 1999 (aged 21)	(Algeria) Youth system
17	(Algeria)	CB	Mustapha Kheiraoui	7 October 1995 (aged 25)	(Algeria) USM Alger
20	(Algeria)	RB	Abderrahim Abdelli	9 August 1996 (aged 24)	(Algeria) Youth system
24	(Algeria)	CB	Anès Abbes	7 October 1996 (aged 24)	(Algeria) Youth system
25	(Algeria)	LB	Houari Baouche	24 December 1995 (aged 25)	(Algeria) CA Bordj Bou Arreridj
27	(Algeria)	RB	Sofiane Khadir	3 August 1994 (aged 26)	(Algeria) NA Hussein Dey
Midfielders
6	(Algeria)	DM	Yahia Miloud Koufi	5 July 1998 (aged 22)	(Algeria) Youth system
8	(Algeria)	AM	Hamza Ounnas	18 December 1988 (aged 32)	(Algeria) DRB Tadjenanet
9	(Tunisia)	DM	Mehdi Ouertani	17 June 1990 (aged 30)	(Algeria) MC Alger
10	(Algeria)	CM	Aikel Charrad Gadacha	29 March 1993 (aged 27)	(Algeria) CA Bordj Bou Arreridj
22	(Algeria)		Redouane Bounoua	1 November 1998 (aged 22)	(Algeria) Youth system
23	(Algeria)	RW	Khalil Semahi	20 January 1995 (aged 25)	(Algeria) JS Saoura
Forwards
7	(Algeria)	RW	Mohamed El Amine Belmokhtar	16 April 1995 (aged 25)	(Algeria) CA Bordj Bou Arreridj
11	(Algeria)	ST	Abdelwahid Belgherbi	3 February 1990 (aged 30)	(Algeria) JS Kabylie
12	(Algeria)	LW	Mohamed Kamel Soltani	1 April 1991 (aged 29)	(Algeria) MO Béjaïa
14	(Algeria)	LW	Dadi El Hocine Mouaki	11 September 1996 (aged 24)	(Tunisia) Étoile Sportive du Sahel
18	(Algeria)	LW	Mohamed Itim	10 January 1997 (aged 23)	(Algeria) MC Oran
19	(Algeria)	ST	Ali Haroun	1 February 1997 (aged 23)	(Algeria) NC Magra
21	(Algeria)	AM	Abdelaziz Litt	12 January 1993 (aged 27)	(Algeria) IS Tighennif
26	(Algeria)	ST	Mouloud Nabil Metref	29 July 1996 (aged 24)	(Algeria) Youth system

== Competitions ==
=== Overview ===
Competition	Record								Started round	Final position / round	First match	Last match
Competition	G	W	D	L	GF	GA	GD	Win %	Started round	Final position / round	First match	Last match
Ligue 1	0	0	0	0	0	0	+0	—	—N/a	To be confirmed	In Progress	In Progress
League Cup	1	0	0	1	0	1	−1	0.00	Round of 16		30 April 2021	
Total	0	0	0	0	0	0	+0	—				

Updated to match played 7 March 2020
Source: Competitions

== League table ==
Pos	Team	Pld	W	D	L	GF	GA	GD	Pts	Qualification or relegation
16	ASO Chlef	38	12	9	17	39	53	−14	45	
17	AS Aïn M'lila (R)	38	13	8	17	38	53	−15	44 (Note: On May 30, 2021 after the participation of a penalized player Hamza Ziad against JS Kabylie, AS Ain M'lila Lost the match 3–0 and deducted 3 points.)	Relegation to Ligue 2
18	USM Bel Abbès (R)	38	9	11	18	32	58	−26	38	Relegation to Ligue 2
19	CA Bordj Bou Arréridj (R)	38	4	10	24	29	67	−38	22	Relegation to Ligue 2
20	JSM Skikda (R)	38	5	3	30	17	73	−56	18	Relegation to Ligue 2

Updated to match(es) played on 28 August 2021. Source: dzfoot.com
Rules for classification: 1) points; 2) head-to-head points; 3) head-to-head goal difference; 4) goal difference; 5) total goals; 6) fairplay ranking; 7) playoff.
(R) Relegated

=== Results summary ===
Overall								Home						Away					
Pld	W	D	L	GF	GA	GD	Pts	W	D	L	GF	GA	GD	W	D	L	GF	GA	GD
0	0	0	0	0	0	0	0	0	0	0	0	0	0	0	0	0	0	0	0

Last updated: 7 March 2020.
Source: Competitive matches

=== Results by round ===
Round	1	2	3	4	5	6	7	8	9	10	11	12	13	14	15	16	17	18	19	20	21	22	23	24	25	26	27	28	29	30	31	32	33	34	35	36	37	38
Ground																																						
Result	L	D	L	L	D	L	W	W	L	L	D	L	D	D	W	L	D	L	L	L	D	L	D	D	W	L	W	L	L	L	W	L	W	W	D	W	D	L
Position	17	16	19	20	20	20	17	15	15	18	18	18	17	18	16	17	17	18	18	18	18	18	19	18	18	18	18	18	18	18	18	18	18	18	18	18	18	18

Updated to match(es) played on 24 August 2021. Source: Competitive matches
A = Away; H = Home; W = Win; D = Draw; L = Loss

=== Matches ===
On 22 October 2020, the Algerian Ligue Professionnelle 1 fixtures were announced.

4 December 2020 Round 2	CA Bordj Bou Arreridj	1–1	USM Bel Abbès	Bordj Bou Arréridj
14:00	Gattal 70'	Soccerway report	Abbas 45+1'	Stadium: Stade 20 Août 1955; Attendance: 0 (close doors); Referee: Hamza Bouslimani

8 December 2020 Round 1	USM Bel Abbès	1–2	MC Alger	Sidi Bel Abbès
15:00	Bounoua 65'	Soccerway report	Frioui 15' (pen.), 90+1'	Stadium: Stade 24 Fevrier 1956; Attendance: 0 (close doors); Referee: Farouk Mial

12 December 2020 Round 3	USM Bel Abbès	0–2	ES Sétif	Sidi Bel Abbès
14:00		Soccerway report	Ghacha 14'; Laouafi 62'	Stadium: Stade 24 Fevrier 1956; Attendance: 0 (close doors); Referee: Amine Sekhraoui

19 December 2020 Round 4	JS Saoura	2–0	USM Bel Abbès	Béchar
14:30	Messaoudi 50', 87'	Soccerway report		Stadium: Stade 20 Août 1955; Attendance: 0 (close doors); Referee: Hamza Bouslimani

23 December 2020 Round 5	USM Bel Abbès	1–1	MC Oran	Sidi Bel Abbès
15:00	Litt 30'	Soccerway report	Hamidi 67'	Stadium: Stade 24 Fevrier 1956; Attendance: 0 (close doors); Referee: Mehdi Abid Charef

27 December 2020 Round 6	ASO Chlef	4–1	USM Bel Abbès	Chlef
15:00	Arab 45+1'; Ouis 53'; Tahar 56'; Alili 88'	Soccerway report	Soltani 66'	Stadium: Stade Mohamed Boumezrag; Attendance: 0 (close doors); Referee: Redouane Necib

9 January 2021 Round 7	USM Bel Abbès	1–0	NC Magra	Sidi Bel Abbès
15:00	Metref 31'	Soccerway report		Stadium: Stade 24 Fevrier 1956; Attendance: 0 (close doors); Referee: Youcef Gamouh

15 January 2021 Round 8	US Biskra	0–1	USM Bel Abbès	Biskra
14:00		Soccerway report	Metref 67'	Stadium: Stade du 18 Février; Attendance: 0 (close doors); Referee: Mohamed Saïdi

22 January 2021 Round 9	USM Bel Abbès	2–3	WA Tlemcen	Sidi Bel Abbès
15:00	Hamza 15', 66'	Soccerway report	Zermane 19' (pen.); Ibouzidène 62'; Benachour 90+5' (pen.)	Stadium: Stade 24 Fevrier 1956; Attendance: 0 (close doors); Referee: Lyés Bekouassa

26 January 2021 Round 10	CR Belouizdad	3–1	USM Bel Abbès	Belouizdad
14:30	Belkhir 19' (pen.); Selmi 24'; Sayoud 42'	Soccerway report	Haroun 50'	Stadium: Stade 20 Août 1955; Attendance: 0 (close doors); Referee: Abdelmoumen Touabti

30 January 2021 Round 11	USM Bel Abbès	1–1	USM Alger	Sidi Bel Abbès
15:00	Belaïd 67' (o.g.)	Soccerway report	Koudri 81'	Stadium: Stade 24 Fevrier 1956; Attendance: 0 (close doors); Referee: Malek Ait Ameur

6 February 2021 Round 12	AS Aïn M'lila	1–0	USM Bel Abbès	Aïn M'lila
14:30	Hamia 87' (pen.)	Soccerway report		Stadium: Touhami Zoubir Khelifi Stadium; Attendance: 0 (close doors); Referee: Hamza Boucetta

12 February 2021 Round 13	USM Bel Abbès	0–0	Paradou AC	Sidi Bel Abbès
15:00		Soccerway report		Stadium: Stade 24 Fevrier 1956; Attendance: 0 (close doors); Referee: Redouane Necib

19 February 2021 Round 14	NA Hussein Dey	1–1	USM Bel Abbès	Belouizdad
14:30	Nadji 12' (pen.)	Soccerway report	Haroun 69' (pen.)	Stadium: Stade 20 Août 1955; Attendance: 0 (close doors); Referee: Abdelali Ibrir

26 February 2021 Round 15	USM Bel Abbès	2–1	JSM Skikda	Sidi Bel Abbès
16:00	Mouaki 77' (pen.); Belgherbi 84' (pen.)	Soccerway report	Merzougi 86' (pen.)	Stadium: Stade 24 Fevrier 1956; Attendance: 0 (close doors); Referee: Amine Sekhraoui

5 March 2021 Round 16	RC Relizane	1–0	USM Bel Abbès	Relizane
15:00	Aoued 32'	Soccerway report		Stadium: Stade Tahar Zoughari; Attendance: 0 (close doors); Referee: Youcef Gamouh

12 March 2021 Round 17	Olympique de Médéa	1–1	USM Bel Abbès	Médéa
15:00	Khalfallah 78' (pen.)	Soccerway report	Bounoua 51'	Stadium: Stade Imam Lyes; Attendance: 0 (close doors); Referee: Abdelmoumen Touabti

21 March 2021 Round 19	CS Constantine	1–0	USM Bel Abbès	Constantine
15:00	Bentahar 81'	Soccerway report		Stadium: Stade Ramdane Benabdelmalek; Attendance: 0 (close doors); Referee: Malek Ait Ameur

25 April 2021 Round 18	USM Bel Abbès	0–5	JS Kabylie	Sidi Bel Abbès
22:30		Soccerway report	Tubal 42', 57', 81'; Boualia 68'; Bensayah 79'	Stadium: Stade 24 Fevrier 1956; Attendance: 0 (close doors); Referee: Abdelali Ibrir

4 May 2021 Round 20	MC Alger	2–1	USM Bel Abbès	Algiers
22:30	Hadded 11'; Lamara 55' (pen.)	Soccerway report	Metref 88'	Stadium: Stade du 5 Juillet; Attendance: 0 (close doors); Referee: Ahmed Bouzrar

16 May 2021 Round 21	USM Bel Abbès	1–1	CA Bordj Bou Arreridj	Sidi Bel Abbès
17:00	Mouaki 45+4'	Soccerway report	Belferoum 77'	Stadium: Stade 24 Fevrier 1956; Attendance: 0 (close doors); Referee: Walid Lahrache

22 May 2021 Round 22	ES Sétif	8–0	USM Bel Abbès	Sétif
17:00	Djahnit 11' (pen.); Amoura 21', 33'; Kendouci 23'; Laouafi 63'; Berbache 82'; Ghacha 90+1'; Saâdi 90+4'	Soccerway report		Stadium: Stade 8 Mai 1945; Attendance: 0 (close doors); Referee: Abdelkader Belhabib

26 May 2021 Round 23	USM Bel Abbès	1–1	JS Saoura	Sidi Bel Abbès
17:45	Hamza 76'	Soccerway report	Saâd 69'	Stadium: Stade 24 Fevrier 1956; Attendance: 0 (close doors); Referee: Houssam Benyahia

30 May 2021 Round 24	MC Oran	1–1	USM Bel Abbès	Oran
17:00	Nekkache 82'	Soccerway report	Ounnas 57'	Stadium: Ahmed Zabana Stadium; Attendance: 0 (close doors); Referee: Hamza Bouslimani

10 June 2021 Round 25	USM Bel Abbès	2–1	ASO Chlef	Sidi Bel Abbès
17:00	Ouertani 41'; Belmokhtar 69' (pen.)	Soccerway report	Bouguettaya 34'	Stadium: Stade 24 Fevrier 1956; Attendance: 0 (close doors); Referee: Lyés Bekouassa

19 June 2021 Round 26	NC Magra	1–0	USM Bel Abbès	Magra
17:00	Demane 88'	Soccerway report		Stadium: Boucheligue Brothers Stadium; Attendance: 0 (close doors); Referee: Amine Sekhraoui

26 June 2021 Round 27	USM Bel Abbès	1–0	US Biskra	Sidi Bel Abbès
17:00	Sailaa 79'	Soccerway report		Stadium: Stade 24 Fevrier 1956; Attendance: 0 (close doors); Referee: Malek Ait Ameur

1 July 2021 Round 28	WA Tlemcen	3–1	USM Bel Abbès	Tlemcen
17:00	Semahi 11', 54'; Touil 88'	Soccerway report	Ounnas 66'	Stadium: Stade Akid Lotfi; Attendance: 0 (close doors); Referee: Lyés Bekouassa

4 July 2021 Round 29	USM Bel Abbès	0–2	CR Belouizdad	Sidi Bel Abbès
19:00		Soccerway report	Sayoud 50' (pen.), 81'	Stadium: Stade 24 Fevrier 1956; Attendance: 0 (close doors); Referee: Boubekeur Zouaoui

8 July 2021 Round 30	USM Alger	3–1	USM Bel Abbès	Bologhine
21:00	Naidji 5'; Zouari 32'; Belkacemi 66'	Soccerway report	Mouaki 13' (pen.)	Stadium: Omar Hamadi Stadium; Attendance: 0 (close doors); Referee: Said Aouina

13 July 2021 Round 31	USM Bel Abbès	1–0	AS Aïn M'lila	Sidi Bel Abbès
20:30	Belmokhtar 39'	Soccerway report		Stadium: Stade 24 Fevrier 1956; Attendance: 0 (close doors); Referee: Farouk Mial

17 July 2021 Round 32	Paradou AC	2–0	USM Bel Abbès	Dar El Beïda
18:00	Mouali 45+2'; Boucif 90+1'	Soccerway report		Stadium: Omar Benrabah Stadium; Attendance: 0 (close doors); Referee: Abderrezzak Arab

23 July 2021 Round 33	USM Bel Abbès	1–0	NA Hussein Dey	Sidi Bel Abbès
20:30	Ounnas 75' (pen.)	Soccerway report		Stadium: Stade 24 Fevrier 1956; Attendance: 0 (close doors); Referee: Houssam Benyahia

27 July 2021 Round 34	JSM Skikda	0–3	USM Bel Abbès	Skikda
17:45		Soccerway report	Mouaki 45+4', 57'; Koufi 78'	Stadium: Stade 20 Août 1955; Attendance: 0 (close doors); Referee: Redouane Allou

9 August 2021 Round 35	USM Bel Abbès	2–2	RC Relizane	Sidi Bel Abbès
21:00	Hamza 15'; Itim 67'	Soccerway report	Hellal 82'; Mazari 90'	Stadium: Stade 24 Fevrier 1956; Attendance: 0 (close doors); Referee: Hamza Boucetta

18 August 2021 Round 36	USM Bel Abbès	2–0	Olympique de Médéa	Sidi Bel Abbès
21:00	Bendouma 13'; Mouaki 23'	Soccerway report		Stadium: Stade 24 Fevrier 1956; Attendance: 0 (close doors); Referee: Hadj Aissa Semmeche

21 August 2021 Round 37	JS Kabylie	0–0	USM Bel Abbès	Tizi Ouzou
21:00		Soccerway report		Stadium: Stade 1er Novembre 1954; Attendance: 0 (close doors); Referee: Ahmed Benhamou

24 August 2021 Round 38	USM Bel Abbès	–	CS Constantine	Sidi Bel Abbès
21:00		Soccerway report		Stadium: Stade 24 Fevrier 1956; Attendance: 0 (close doors); Referee: Oukil

== League Cup ==
30 April 2021 Round of 16	Olympique de Médéa	1–0	USM Bel Abbes	Médéa
22:30	Elghomari 51' (pen.)			Stadium: Stade Imam Lyes; Attendance: 0 (close doors); Referee: Hamza Bouslimani
Note: Lineup for USM Bel Abbès - Morcely, Menezla (Koufi, 67'), Sailaa, Abbes, Bendouma, Ouertani (El Badaoui, 60'), Ounnas, Mouaki (Bounoua, 67'), Belmokhtar, Metref, Soltani.

== Squad information ==
=== Playing statistics ===
No.	Pos	Nat	Player	Total		Ligue 1		League Cup	
No.	Pos	Nat	Player	Apps	Goals	Apps	Goals	Apps	Goals
Goalkeepers
1	GK	(Algeria) ALG	Abdelkader Zarat Belmokhtar	0	0	0	0	0	0
16	GK	(Algeria) ALG	Abdelkader Morcely	0	0	0	0	0	0
Defenders
2	DF	(Algeria) ALG	Abdelhak Sailaa	0	0	0	0	0	0
3	DF	(Algeria) ALG	Abbes Noureddine Haddou	0	0	0	0	0	0
4	DF	(Algeria) ALG	Nasreddine Benlebna	0	0	0	0	0	0
5	DF	(Algeria) ALG	Mohammed Hamza	0	0	0	0	0	0
13	DF	(Algeria) ALG	Mohammed Yassine Bounoua	0	0	0	0	0	0
15	DF	(Algeria) ALG	Ishak Ben Hassaini	0	0	0	0	0	0
17	DF	(Algeria) ALG	Mustapha Kheiraoui	0	0	0	0	0	0
20	DF	(Algeria) ALG	Abderrahim Abdelli	0	0	0	0	0	0
24	DF	(Algeria) ALG	Abderrahim Abdelli	0	0	0	0	0	0
25	DF	(Algeria) ALG	Abderrahim Abdelli	0	0	0	0	0	0
27	DF	(Algeria) ALG	Sofiane Khadir	0	0	0	0	0	0
Midfielders
6	MF	(Algeria) ALG	Yahia Miloud Koufi	0	0	0	0	0	0
8	MF	(Algeria) ALG	Hamza Ounnas	0	0	0	0	0	0
9	MF	(Tunisia) TUN	Mehdi Ouertani	0	0	0	0	0	0
10	MF	(Algeria) ALG	Aikel Charrad Gadacha	0	0	0	0	0	0
22	MF	(Algeria) ALG	Redouane Bounoua	0	0	0	0	0	0
23	MF	(Algeria) ALG	Khalil Semahi	0	0	0	0	0	0
Forwards
7	FW	(Algeria) ALG	Mohamed El Amine Belmokhtar	0	0	0	0	0	0
11	FW	(Algeria) ALG	Abdelwahid Belgherbi	0	0	0	0	0	0
12	FW	(Algeria) ALG	Mohamed Kamel Soltani	0	0	0	0	0	0
14	FW	(Algeria) ALG	Dadi El Hocine Mouaki	0	0	0	0	0	0
18	FW	(Algeria) ALG	Mohamed Itim	0	0	0	0	0	0
21	FW	(Algeria) ALG	Abdelaziz Litt	0	0	0	0	0	0
26	FW	(Algeria) ALG	Mouloud Nabil Metref	0	0	0	0	0	0
Players transferred out during the season
19	FW	(Algeria) ALG	Ali Haroun	0	0	0	0	0	0

Last updated: 11 June 2018
Source: fr.soccerway.com

=== Goalscorers ===
Includes all competitive matches. The list is sorted alphabetically by surname when total goals are equal.

== Transfers ==
=== In ===
Date	Pos	Player	From club	Transfer fee	Source
3 October 2020	RB	(Algeria) Mohamed Tiboutine	USM Alger	Free transfer	
3 October 2020	MF	(Algeria) Nazim Itim	MC Oran	Free transfer	
6 October 2020	MF	(Algeria) Mohamed El Amine Belmokhtar	CA Bordj Bou Arreridj	Free transfer	
6 October 2020	FW	(Algeria) Abdelwahid Belgherbi	JS Kabylie	Free transfer	
7 October 2020	CB	(Algeria) Mustapha Kheiraoui	USM Alger	Free transfer	
7 October 2020	MF	(Algeria) Khalil Semahi	JS Saoura	Free transfer	
26 October 2020	DF	(Algeria) Abdelhak Saïla	MC Alger	Loan for one year	
26 October 2020	MF	(Tunisia) Mehdi Ouertani	MC Alger	Free transfer	
26 October 2020	DF	(Algeria) Sofiane Khadir	NA Hussein Dey	Free transfer	
27 October 2020	FW	(Algeria) Redouane Maâchou	CR Belouizdad	Loan for two years	

=== Out ===
Date	Pos	Player	To club	Transfer fee	Source
17 August 2020	RB	(Algeria) Fateh Achour	USM Alger	Free transfer	
26 September 2020	CB	(Algeria) Anes Saad	CR Belouizdad	Free transfer	
27 September 2020	MF	(Algeria) Abdennour Belhocini	(Qatar) Umm Salal	Free transfer	
2 October 2020	FW	(Algeria) Ameur Bouguettaya	ASO Chlef	Free transfer	
8 April 2021	DF	(Algeria) Nasreddine Benlebna	USM Bel Abbès	Free transfer	
9 April 2021	ST	(Algeria) Ali Haroun	JS Kabylie	Free transfer	
