= 2020–21 JSM Skikda season =

JSM Skikda
2020–21 season
- President: Djamel Guitari
- Head coach: Younes Ifticen (until 28 January 2021); Fouad Bouali (from 4 February 2021); Cherif Hadjar (from 17 April 2021)
- Stadium: Stade 20 Août 1955
- Ligue 1: 20th (relegated)
- League Cup: Round of 16
- Top goalscorer: League: Kheireddine Merzougui (7 goals); All: Kheireddine Merzougui (7 goals)
- Highest home attendance: 0 (Note: no one can attend games due to the COVID-19 pandemic)
- Lowest home attendance: 0 (Note: no one can attend games due to the COVID-19 pandemic)
- Average home league attendance: 0 (Note: no one can attend games due to the COVID-19 pandemic)

In the 2020–21 season, JSM Skikda is competing in the Ligue 1 for the 4th season, and the League Cup.

== Squad list ==
Players and squad numbers last updated on 15 November 2020.
Note: Flags indicate national team as has been defined under FIFA eligibility rules. Players may hold more than one non-FIFA nationality.

No.	Nat.	Position	Name	Date of Birth (Age)	Signed from
Goalkeepers
1	(Algeria)	GK	Abdebassit Bouchareb	27 February 1998 (aged 22)	(Algeria) Youth system
16	(Algeria)	GK	Aymen Khoudja	12 August 1998 (aged 22)	(Algeria) US Chaouia
25	(Algeria)	GK	Sofiane Kacem	11 January 1993 (aged 27)	(Algeria) CR Belouizdad
Defenders
2	(Algeria)	RB	Adam Larit	23 December 1998 (aged 22)	(Algeria) Youth system
4	(Algeria)	CB	Oussama Boultouak	29 October 1993 (aged 27)	(Algeria) Olympique de Médéa
5	(Algeria)	CB	Youssef Zahzouh	5 October 1989 (aged 31)	(Algeria) ASM Oran
7	(Algeria)	RB	Ayache Ziouache	20 January 1995 (aged 25)	(Algeria) CS Constantine
17	(Algeria)	RB	Houssam Bahraoui	23 May 1993 (aged 27)	(Algeria) WA Tlemcen
18	(Algeria)	CB	Khalil Khennab	17 April 1989 (aged 31)	(Algeria) CA Batna
20	(Algeria)	CB	Youcef Belamine	24 July 1997 (aged 23)	(Algeria) Youth system
22	(Algeria)	RB	Soheyb Talbi	10 March 1994 (aged 26)	(Algeria) ?
23	(Algeria)	CB	Lyes Oukkal	5 November 1991 (aged 29)	(Algeria) USM Alger
Midfielders
6	(Algeria)	DM	Zakaria Benhocine	19 May 1986 (aged 34)	(Algeria) USM El Harrach
8	(Algeria)		Mohamed Ladaouri	29 September 1990 (aged 30)	(Algeria) US Biskra
13	(Algeria)	RM	Charif Nasseri	6 October 1990 (aged 30)	(Algeria) MC El Eulma
15	(Algeria)		Oussama Khentit	12 July 1999 (aged 21)	(Algeria) Youth system
21	(Algeria)	AM	Massinissa Tafni	2 April 1995 (aged 25)	(Algeria) JS Kabylie
29	(Algeria)	DM	Abdelkader Boussaid	19 March 1992 (aged 28)	(Algeria) ASO Chlef
Forwards
3	(Algeria)	RW	Amine Aissa El Bey	19 February 1995 (aged 25)	(Algeria) CA Bordj Bou Arreridj
9	(Algeria)	RW	Ishak Bouda	3 January 1993 (aged 27)	(Algeria) USM Bel Abbès
10	(Algeria)	ST	Kheireddine Merzougui	16 August 1992 (aged 28)	(Algeria) Unattached
11	(Algeria)	RW	Abdelkader Kaibou	12 September 1997 (aged 23)	(Algeria) ASO Chlef
12	(Algeria)		Hamza Loucif	30 June 1998 (aged 22)	(Algeria) Youth system
19	(Algeria)	LW	Walid Hamidi	16 October 1996 (aged 24)	(Algeria) ASM Oran
24	(Algeria)	ST	Walid Djaballah Boudjebiba	26 January 1999 (aged 21)	(Algeria) ASO Chlef
26	(Algeria)	LW	Lotfi Dif	6 January 1994 (aged 26)	(Algeria) USM Annaba

== Pre-season ==
8 November 2020 Friendly	USM Alger	1–1	JSM Skikda	Zéralda
16:00	Mahious 16'	Report	Merzougi 62' (pen.)	Stadium: Zéralda Stadium

== Competitions ==
=== Overview ===
Competition	Record								Started round	Final position / round	First match	Last match
Competition	G	W	D	L	GF	GA	GD	Win %	Started round	Final position / round	First match	Last match
Ligue 1	0	0	0	0	0	0	+0	—	—N/a	To be confirmed	28 November 2020	In Progress
League Cup	1	0	0	1	0	4	−4	0.00	Round of 16		8 May 2021	
Total	0	0	0	0	0	0	+0	—				

Updated to match played 7 March 2020
Source: Competitions

== League table ==
Pos	Team	Pld	W	D	L	GF	GA	GD	Pts	Qualification or relegation
16	ASO Chlef	38	12	9	17	39	53	−14	45	
17	AS Aïn M'lila (R)	38	13	8	17	38	53	−15	44 (Note: On May 30, 2021 after the participation of a penalized player Hamza Ziad against JS Kabylie, AS Ain M'lila Lost the match 3–0 and deducted 3 points.)	Relegation to Ligue 2
18	USM Bel Abbès (R)	38	9	11	18	32	58	−26	38	Relegation to Ligue 2
19	CA Bordj Bou Arréridj (R)	38	4	10	24	29	67	−38	22	Relegation to Ligue 2
20	JSM Skikda (R)	38	5	3	30	17	73	−56	18	Relegation to Ligue 2

Updated to match(es) played on 28 August 2021. Source: dzfoot.com
Rules for classification: 1) points; 2) head-to-head points; 3) head-to-head goal difference; 4) goal difference; 5) total goals; 6) fairplay ranking; 7) playoff.
(R) Relegated

=== Results summary ===
Overall								Home						Away					
Pld	W	D	L	GF	GA	GD	Pts	W	D	L	GF	GA	GD	W	D	L	GF	GA	GD
0	0	0	0	0	0	0	0	0	0	0	0	0	0	0	0	0	0	0	0

Last updated: 7 March 2020.
Source: Competitive matches

=== Results by round ===
Round	1	2	3	4	5	6	7	8	9	10	11	12	13	14	15	16	17	18	19	20	21	22	23	24	25	26	27	28	29	30	31	32	33	34	35	36	37	38
Ground																																						
Result	L	L	W	L	L	D	W	D	L	L	L	L	L	W	L	L	L	L	L	W	L	L	W	L	L	L	L	L	L	D	L	L	L	L	L	L	L	L
Position	19	19	14	16	17	17	15	16	16	19	19	19	19	19	19	19	19	19	19	19	19	19	18	19	20	20	20	20	20	20	20	20	20	20	20	20	20	20

Updated to match(es) played on 24 August 2021. Source: Competitive matches
A = Away; H = Home; W = Win; D = Draw; L = Loss

=== Matches ===
On 22 October 2020, the Algerian Ligue Professionnelle 1 fixtures were announced.

28 November 2020 Round 1	US Biskra	1–0	JSM Skikda	Biskra
15:00	Athmani 72'	Soccerway report		Stadium: Stade du 18 Février; Attendance: 0 (close doors); Referee: Lyés Bekouassa

11 December 2020 Round 3	JSM Skikda	1–0	CA Bordj Bou Arreridj	Skikda
14:00	Khennab 68'	Soccerway report		Stadium: Stade 20 Août 1955; Attendance: 0 (close doors); Referee: Lahlou Benbraham

19 December 2020 Round 4	AS Ain M'lila	3–0	JSM Skikda	Aïn M'lila
14:30	Elmammeri 11', 87'; Djabout 17'	Soccerway report		Stadium: Touhami Zoubir Khelifi Stadium; Attendance: 0 (close doors); Referee: Houssam Benyahia

23 December 2020 Round 5	JSM Skikda	1–4	ASO Chlef	Skikda
14:30	Merzougi 68'	Soccerway report	Beldjilali 38', 56'; Bengrina 82'; Merili 89' (pen.)	Stadium: Stade 20 Août 1955; Attendance: 0 (close doors); Referee: Ahmed Bouzrar

27 December 2020 Round 6	WA Tlemcen	0–0	JSM Skikda	Tlemcen
15:00		Soccerway report		Stadium: Stade Akid Lotfi; Attendance: 0 (close doors); Referee: Hamza Bouslimani

31 December 2020 Round 2	CR Belouizdad	3–2	JSM Skikda	Belouizdad
14:30	Belahouel 9', 19'; Bechou 86' (pen.)	Soccerway report	Kaibou 23'; Merzougui 90+1'	Stadium: Stade 20 Août 1955; Attendance: 0 (close doors); Referee: Amine Hansal

8 January 2021 Round 7	JSM Skikda	1–0	JS Saoura	Skikda
14:30	Ziouache 68'	Soccerway report		Stadium: Stade 20 Août 1955; Attendance: 0 (close doors); Referee: Said Aouina

14 January 2021 Round 8	JSM Skikda	0–0	CS Constantine	Skikda
14:00		Soccerway report		Stadium: Stade 20 Août 1955; Attendance: 0 (close doors); Referee: Yazid Ibrir

22 January 2021 Round 9	Paradou AC	3–0	JSM Skikda	Dar El Beïda
14:30	Zorgane 45' (pen.), 53'; Mouali 68'	Soccerway report		Stadium: Omar Benrabah Stadium; Attendance: 0 (close doors); Referee: Mohamed Saïdi

26 January 2021 Round 10	JSM Skikda	0–1	NA Hussein Dey	Skikda
14:30		Soccerway report	Ait L'Hadi 37'	Stadium: Stade 20 Août 1955; Attendance: 0 (close doors); Referee: Ali Nader

30 January 2021 Round 11	JS Kabylie	1–0	JSM Skikda	Tizi Ouzou
15:00	Boulahia 65'	Soccerway report		Stadium: Stade 1er Novembre 1954; Attendance: 0 (close doors); Referee: Lotfi Bekouassa

7 February 2021 Round 12	JSM Skikda	0–1	Olympique de Médéa	Skikda
14:30		Soccerway report	Medane 39'	Stadium: Stade 20 Août 1955; Attendance: 0 (close doors); Referee: Abdelmoumen Touabti

13 February 2021 Round 13	RC Relizane	2–1	JSM Skikda	Relizane
14:30	Balegh 31'; Chettih 77'	Soccerway report	Merzougi 82'	Stadium: Stade Tahar Zoughari; Attendance: 0 (close doors); Referee: Mustapha Ghorbal

26 February 2021 Round 15	USM Bel Abbès	2–1	JSM Skikda	Sidi Bel Abbès
16:00	Mouaki 77' (pen.); Belgherbi 84' (pen.)	Soccerway report	Merzougi 86' (pen.)	Stadium: Stade 24 Fevrier 1956; Attendance: 0 (close doors); Referee: Amine Sekhraoui

6 March 2021 Round 16	JSM Skikda	0–1	MC Oran	Skikda
15:00		Soccerway report	Motrani 60'	Stadium: Stade 20 Août 1955; Attendance: 0 (close doors); Referee: Hamza Bouslimani

13 March 2021 Round 17	NC Magra	3–2	JSM Skikda	Magra
15:00	Bourahla 47'; Demane 81'; Khelili 86'	Soccerway report	Merzougi 70', 90+2' (pen.)	Stadium: Boucheligue Brothers Stadium; Attendance: 0 (close doors); Referee: Lotfi Bekouassa

20 March 2021 Round 19	USM Alger	4–1	JSM Skikda	Bologhine
15:00	Belem 8'; Belkacemi 35' (pen.), 63' (pen.); Benkhelifa 90+1'	Soccerway report	Merzougui 12' (pen.)	Stadium: Omar Hamadi Stadium; Attendance: 0 (close doors); Referee: Mohamed Saïdi

16 April 2021 Round 14	JSM Skikda	1–0	MC Alger	Skikda
16:00	Bahraoui 89'	Soccerway report		Stadium: Stade 20 Août 1955; Attendance: 0 (close doors); Referee: Houssam Benyahia

1 May 2021 Round 18	JSM Skikda	0–1	ES Sétif	Skikda
16:00		Soccerway report	Berbache 19'	Stadium: Stade 20 Août 1955; Attendance: 0 (close doors); Referee: Lahlou Benbraham

4 May 2021 Round 20	JSM Skikda	2–1	US Biskra	Skikda
16:00	Kaibou 18'; Bouda 61'	Soccerway report	Chibane 10'	Stadium: Stade 20 Août 1955; Attendance: 0 (close doors); Referee: Abdelali Ibrir

22 May 2021 Round 22	CA Bordj Bou Arreridj	1–0	JSM Skikda	Bordj Bou Arréridj
17:00	Ziani 40'	Soccerway report		Stadium: Stade 20 Août 1955; Attendance: 0 (close doors); Referee: Bouderbala

26 May 2021 Round 23	JSM Skikda	2–0	AS Ain M'lila	Skikda
17:00	Khennab 61'; Boudjebiba 75' (pen.)	Soccerway report		Stadium: Stade 20 Août 1955; Attendance: 0 (close doors); Referee: Ahmed Bouzrar

30 May 2021 Round 24	ASO Chlef	1–0	JSM Skikda	Chlef
18:00	Meharzi 72'	Soccerway report		Stadium: Stade Mohamed Boumezrag; Attendance: 0 (close doors); Referee: Amine Sekhraoui

8 June 2021 Round 21	JSM Skikda	0–6	CR Belouizdad	Skikda
16:00		Soccerway report	Selmi 17'; Khalfallah 32', 33'; Merzougui 42'; Sayoud 43'; Tabti 64'	Stadium: Stade 20 Août 1955; Attendance: 0 (close doors); Referee: Said Aouina

13 June 2021 Round 25	JSM Skikda	1–2	WA Tlemcen	Skikda
17:00	Kaibou 45+3'	Soccerway report	Semahi 29'; Aichi 45+2'	Stadium: Stade 20 Août 1955; Attendance: 0 (close doors); Referee: Malek Ait Ameur

19 June 2021 Round 26	JS Saoura	3–0	JSM Skikda	Béchar
20:00	Messaoudi 15'; Boubekeur 40'; Hamidi 52'	Soccerway report		Stadium: Stade 20 Août 1955; Attendance: 0 (close doors); Referee: Walid Lahrache

27 June 2021 Round 27	CS Constantine	4–0	JSM Skikda	Constantine
17:00	Bentahar 2'; Dib 32'; Haddad 48'; Haddouche 69'	Soccerway report		Stadium: Stade Ramdane Benabdelmalek; Attendance: 0 (close doors); Referee: Amar Khoudja

1 July 2021 Round 28	JSM Skikda	0–3	Paradou AC	Skikda
17:00		Soccerway report	Mouali 58'; Boucif 75'; Kadri 80'	Stadium: Stade 20 Août 1955; Attendance: 0 (close doors); Referee: Abdellah Benchehida

4 July 2021 Round 29	NA Hussein Dey	2–0	JSM Skikda	Belouizdad
17:30	Nadji 23'; Yaya 27' (pen.)	Soccerway report		Stadium: Stade 20 Août 1955; Attendance: 0 (close doors); Referee: Abdelkader Belhabib

13 July 2021 Round 31	Olympique de Médéa	3–0	JSM Skikda	Médéa
20:30	Dadache 45' (pen.); Boultouak 49' (o.g.); Kemoukh 77'	Soccerway report		Stadium: Stade Imam Lyes; Attendance: 0 (close doors); Referee: Fateh Benatia

17 July 2021 Round 32	JSM Skikda	0–2	RC Relizane	Skikda
17:45		Soccerway report	Chadli 41'; Seguer 51'	Stadium: Stade 20 Août 1955; Attendance: 0 (close doors); Referee: Nadjib Meziani

23 July 2021 Round 33	MC Alger	3–0	JSM Skikda	Algiers
20:30	Belkheir 4'; Lamara 52' (pen.); Esso 60'	Soccerway report		Stadium: Stade du 5 Juillet; Attendance: 0 (close doors); Referee: Hamza Mahtouk

27 July 2021 Round 34	JSM Skikda	0–3	USM Bel Abbès	Skikda
17:45		Soccerway report	Mouaki 45+4', 57'; Koufi 78'	Stadium: Stade 20 Août 1955; Attendance: 0 (close doors); Referee: Redouane Allou

9 August 2021 Round 35	MC Oran	1–0	JSM Skikda	Oran
21:00	Freifer 56'	Soccerway report		Stadium: Ahmed Zabana Stadium; Attendance: 0 (close doors); Referee: Mohamed Kralfa

18 August 2021 Round 36	JSM Skikda	0–2	NC Magra	Skikda
17:30		Soccerway report	Aïb 32'; Belhamri 87'	Stadium: Stade 20 Août 1955; Attendance: 0 (close doors); Referee: Mohamed Tahar Milia

21 August 2021 Round 37	ES Sétif	2–0	JSM Skikda	Sétif
21:00	Djahnit 45+1'; Lomotey 58'	Soccerway report		Stadium: Stade 8 Mai 1945; Attendance: 0 (close doors); Referee: Elhadj Chihaoui

24 August 2021 Round 38	JSM Skikda	0–3	USM Alger	Skikda
17:30		Soccerway report	Belkacemi 31', 81'; Othmani 35'	Stadium: Stade 20 Août 1955; Attendance: 0 (close doors); Referee: Abdelkarim Bendebiza

28 August 2021 Round 30	JSM Skikda	1–1	JS Kabylie	Skikda
17:30	Benhamrouche 57'	Soccerway report	Houari 13'	Stadium: Stade 20 Août 1955; Attendance: 0 (close doors); Referee: Akram Mechairia

== Algerian League Cup ==
8 May 2021 Round of 16	JS Saoura	4–0	JSM Skikda	Béchar
22:30	Daoud 26'; Messaoudi 42', 53'; Lahmeri 74' (pen.)			Stadium: Stade 20 Août 1955; Attendance: 0 (close doors); Referee: Mustapha Bessiri
Note: Lineup for JSM Skikda - Laouar, Ali Guechi, Bendjama, Belhadri, Hadded, Remita, Touta, Dakira, Benierbah, Boumediene, Bougarouche.

== Squad information ==
=== Playing statistics ===
No.	Pos	Nat	Player	Total		Ligue 1		League Cup	
No.	Pos	Nat	Player	Apps	Goals	Apps	Goals	Apps	Goals
Goalkeepers
1	GK	(Algeria) ALG	Abdebassit Bouchareb	0	0	0	0	0	0
16	GK	(Algeria) ALG	Aymen Khoudja	0	0	0	0	0	0
25	GK	(Algeria) ALG	Sofiane Kacem	0	0	0	0	0	0
Defenders
2	DF	(Algeria) ALG	Adam Larit	0	0	0	0	0	0
4	DF	(Algeria) ALG	Oussama Boultouak	0	0	0	0	0	0
5	DF	(Algeria) ALG	Youssef Zahzouh	0	0	0	0	0	0
7	DF	(Algeria) ALG	Ayache Ziouache	0	0	0	0	0	0
12	DF	(Algeria) ALG	Hamza Loucif	0	0	0	0	0	0
13	DF	(Algeria) ALG	Charif Nasseri	0	0	0	0	0	0
17	DF	(Algeria) ALG	Houssam Bahraoui	0	0	0	0	0	0
18	DF	(Algeria) ALG	Khalil Khennab	0	0	0	0	0	0
20	DF	(Algeria) ALG	Youcef Belamine	0	0	0	0	0	0
22	DF	(Algeria) ALG	Soheyb Talbi	0	0	0	0	0	0
23	DF	(Algeria) ALG	Lyes Oukkal	0	0	0	0	0	0
Midfielders
3	MF	(Algeria) ALG	Amine Aissa El Bey	0	0	0	0	0	0
6	MF	(Algeria) ALG	Zakaria Benhocine	0	0	0	0	0	0
8	MF	(Algeria) ALG	Mohamed Ladaouri	0	0	0	0	0	0
14	MF	(Algeria) ALG	Abdelkader Boussaid	0	0	0	0	0	0
15	MF	(Algeria) ALG	Oussama Khentit	0	0	0	0	0	0
26	MF	(Algeria) ALG	Lotfi Dif	0	0	0	0	0	0
Forwards
9	FW	(Algeria) ALG	Ishak Bouda	0	0	0	0	0	0
10	FW	(Algeria) ALG	Kheireddine Merzougui	0	0	0	0	0	0
11	FW	(Algeria) ALG	Abdelkader Kaibou	0	0	0	0	0	0
19	FW	(Algeria) ALG	Walid Hamidi	0	0	0	0	0	0
21	FW	(Algeria) ALG	Massinissa Tafni	0	0	0	0	0	0
24	FW	(Algeria) ALG	Walid Djaballah Boudjebiba	0	0	0	0	0	0
Players transferred out during the season

Last updated: 1 June 2018
Source: fr.soccerway.com

=== Goalscorers ===
Includes all competitive matches. The list is sorted alphabetically by surname when total goals are equal.

== Transfers ==
=== In ===
Date	Pos	Player	From club	Transfer fee	Source
30 September 2020	MF	(Algeria) Abdelkader Boussaid	ASO Chlef	Free transfer	
30 September 2020	FW	(Algeria) Abdelkader Kaibou	ASO Chlef	Free transfer	
5 October 2020	FW	(Algeria) Ishak Bouda	USM Bel Abbès	Free transfer	
8 October 2020	DF	(Algeria) Oussama Boultouak	Olympique de Médéa	Free transfer	
20 October 2020	DF	(Algeria) Lyes Oukkal	USM Alger	Free transfer	
20 October 2020	FW	(Algeria) Amine Aissa El Bey	CA Bordj Bou Arreridj	Free transfer	
26 October 2020	FW	(Algeria) Lotfi Dif	USM Annaba	Free transfer	

=== Out ===
Date	Pos	Player	To club	Transfer fee	Source
6 August 2020	DF	(Algeria) Mouad Hadded	MC Alger	Free transfer	
24 August 2020	FW	(Algeria) Réda Betrouni	NA Hussein Dey	Free transfer	
2 October 2020	MF	(Algeria) Mustapha Zeghnoun	ASO Chlef	Free transfer	
4 April 2021	ST	(Algeria) Kheireddine Merzougui	CR Belouizdad	Undisclosed	
