= Sadek Abdellah El Hadj =

Algerian footballer (born 2004)

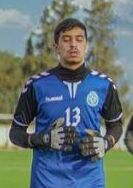
- Abdellah El Hadj in 2022

Personal information
- Date of birth: 1 June 2004 (age 22)
- Place of birth: Blida, Algeria
- Height: 1.90 m (6 ft 3 in)
- Position: Goalkeeper

Team information
- Current team: NA Hussein Dey
- Number: 16

Youth career
- 2010–2022: USM Blida
- 2022: JS Kabylie
- 2022–2024: USM Alger
- 2024–2025: CR Belouizdad

Senior career*
| Years | Team | Apps | (Gls) |
| 2025– | NA Hussein Dey | | |

International career
| 2022 | Algeria U17 | 1 | |
- * Club domestic league appearances and goals as of 16:14, 20 November 2026 (UTC)

Sadek Abdellah El Hadj (Arabic: عبد الله حاج صادق; born 1 June 2004) is an Algerian footballer who plays as a goalkeeper for NA Hussein Dey .

== Club career ==
Born in Blida, El Hadj started his career with local side USM Blida, joining at the age of six. He spent two years in the club's academy, before being promoted to the junior side. At his mother's request, he continued to focus on his studies, playing football while attending university.

He went on to join JS Kabylie, but did not feature during the 2021–22 season as his studies took priority. The following year he trialled with USM Alger, before being offered a contract with the club, and going on to win the national under-19 title in his first season. For his performance in the last game of the season, a 5–1 win, he was named man of the match. On June 23, 2023, El Hadj achieved the U19 league title, it is the third title this season after the Algiers League and the Algerian Cup and won the best goalkeeper award in the Play Offs tournament.

== Honours ==
USM Alger U19

- Ligue 1 U19: 2022–23
- Algerian Cup U19: 2022–23

Individual

- Ligue 1 Play Offs U19 best goalkeeper award: 2023
