= USM Alger Reserves and Academy =

Union sportive de la médina d'Alger
- Full name: USM Alger Development Squad & Academy
- Nicknames: The Reds and Blacks
- Founded: 1937; 89 years ago (as Union Sportive Musulmane d'Alger)
- Ground: Stade Omar Hammadi
- Owner(s): Groupe SERPORT (94.34%); Small shareholders (5.66%)
- Manager: Rabie Meftah (Under 21s); Vacant (Academy)

USM Alger Under-23s are the reserve team of USM Alger. The team mainly consists of Under-23 players at the club, although senior players occasionally play in the reserve side, for instance when they are recovering from injury.

== History ==
USM Alger is one of the clubs that owns a well-known football school in Algeria. In the seventies the club relied on players who graduated from the club most notably Djamel Zidane and Djamel Keddou who spent all his football career with USM Alger. In the eighties, ninety percent of the squad was from the team, especially in the winning season of the Algerian Cup in 1988. Where was the majority of the players from the club, where coach Djamel Keddou put his trust in the colleagues of Farid Bengana, Amirouche Lalili, Farid Mouaci, Salim Boutamine, Athmane Nourine and Tarek Hadj Adlane. On July 4, 2023, USM Alger announced the arrival of five elements for the youth squad Kamil Mohamed Ramzy from JS Djijel, Sid Amhend Ameziane from JS Bordj Ménaïel, Bastani Aymen from Paradou AC, Mihoubi Rabeh from E Sour El Ghozlane and Hemlaoui Ishak from ASO Chlef.

On 20 February 2024, the Russian club CSKA Moscow signed a contract with the under-21 team's player Sid Ahmed Aissaoui for two-year until the end of 2026, with an additional two-year option. The two clubs agreed a transfer fee of $250,000, USM Alger also negotiated a percentage on resale. Aissaoui became the first Algerian player who did not play any minutes with the senior team to join a European club. On August 5, 2024, USM Alger appointed former player Rabie Meftah as coach of the under-21 team. Meftah expressed his happiness to return to a club dear to him and start his new mission with the young players. On August 31, 2024, midfielder Sid mohand Ameziane joined the reserve team of Columbus Crew, a club that plays in Major League Soccer (MLS), in the United States. Ameziane who recently played for the youth teams of USM Alger, is now part of the Columbus Crew squad for a period of one year. A week after defender Riad Belhadj Kacem joined Bulgarian club CSKA Sofia for three seasons on a free transfer.

== Ligue Professionnelle 1 ==
=== Current squad ===
These players can also play with the senior squad and are all Young Professionals.

Note: Flags indicate national team as defined under FIFA eligibility rules; some limited exceptions apply. Players may hold more than one non-FIFA nationality.

No.	Pos.	Nation	Player
—	GK	ALG	Abdellah Zakaria Saouchi
—	GK	ALG	Sadek Abdellah El Hadj
—	GK	ALG	Rabeh Mihoubi
—	DF	ALG	
—	DF	ALG	Wassim Ouhab
—	DF	ALG	
—	DF	ALG	
—	DF	ALG	
—	DF	ALG	Mohamed Bensaid
—	DF	ALG	
—	DF	ALG	
—	DF	ALG	
—	MF	ALG	Mohamed Ramzy Kamil
—	MF	ALG	Ishak Hemlaoui

No.	Pos.	Nation	Player
—	MF	ALG	Mohamed Djenidi
—	MF	ALG	Mostafa Bekane
—	MF	ALG	Aymen Kennan
—	MF	ALG	
—	MF	ALG	
—	MF	ALG	
—	MF	ALG	
—	FW	ALG	
—	FW	ALG	Aymen Bastani
—	FW	ALG	
—	FW	ALG	Samy Bouali
—	FW	ALG	
—	FW	ALG	
—	FW	ALG	

== Notable graduates ==
Current USM Alger players in bold.

- (Algeria) Ayoub Abdellaoui
- (Algeria) Abderrahmane Meziane
- (Algeria) Mohamed Benkhemassa
- (Algeria) Azzedine Rahim

- (Algeria) Djamel Zidane
- (Algeria) Hocine Achiou
- (Algeria) Tarek Hadj Adlane
- (Algeria) Mohamed Hamdoud

- (Algeria) Farid Djahnine
- (Algeria) Zinedine Ferhat

- (Algeria) Djamel Keddou
- (Algeria) Hocine Metref

== USM Alger U21 to Outside ==
Player	Pos	Club	League	Transfer fee	Source
(Algeria) Sid Ahmed Aissaoui	MF	CSKA Moscow	(Russia) Russian Premier League	250,000 $	
(Algeria) Sid mohand Ameziane	DF	Columbus Crew 2	(United States) MLS Next Pro	Free transfer	
(Algeria) Riad Belhadj Kacem	DF	CSKA Sofia	(Bulgaria) efbet League	Free transfer	

== Honours ==
=== Domestic Ligue ===
- **Ligue Professionnelle 1 U21**
  - Winners: 2012–13, 2013–14, 2014–15, 2015–16.
- **Ligue Professionnelle 1 U19**
  - Winners: 2022–23.
- **Ligue Professionnelle 1 U18**
  - Winners: 2011–12.

=== Domestic Cup ===
- **Algerian Cup Junior**
  - Winners: 1972, 1973, 1975, 1989, 1998, 2000.
  - Runners Up: 1970.
- **Algerian U21 Cup**
  - Winners: 2018
- **Algerian Cup Under-19s**
  - Winners: 2018, 2023.
- **Algerian Cup Under-18s**
  - Winners: 2017.
  - Runners Up: 2016.
- **Algerian Cup Under-17s**
  - Winners: 2011.
  - Runners Up: 2007, 2015.
- **Algerian Cup Under-15s**
  - Runners Up: 2008, 2011, 2015.
