= Hicham Belkaroui =

Algerian footballer (born 1990)

Personal information
- Full name: Hicham Belkaroui
- Date of birth: 24 August 1990 (age 36)
- Place of birth: Oran, Algeria
- Height: 1.95 m (6 ft 5 in)
- Position: Centre back

Team information
- Current team: ASM Oran

Youth career
- 2006–2008: ASM Oran

Senior career*
| Years | Team | Apps | (Gls) |
| 2008–2012 | ASM Oran | - | (-) |
| 2011–2012 | → WA Tlemcen (loan) | 17 | (1) |
| 2012–2014 | USM El Harrach | 48 | (4) |
| 2014–2016 | Club Africain | 32 | (1) |
| 2016 | Nacional | 10 | (0) |
| 2016–2017 | Espérance de Tunis | 11 | (0) |
| 2017–2018 | Moreirense | 16 | (0) |
| 2018–2019 | Al-Raed | 19 | (1) |
| 2019–2020 | USM Alger | 4 | (0) |
| 2020–2021 | MC Oran | 13 | (0) |
| 2021–2022 | ES Sétif | 22 | (0) |
| 2022–2023 | Al-Ain | 16 | (0) |
| 2023– | ASM Oran | 0 | (0) |

International career^{‡}
| 2011 | Algeria U23 | 2 | (0) |
| 2013 | Algeria A' | 1 | (0) |
| 2015– | Algeria | 9 | (0) |
- * Club domestic league appearances and goals as of 10 September 2023 ‡ National team caps and goals as of 2016

Hicham Belkaroui (born 24 August 1990) is an Algerian professional footballer who plays for ASM Oran and the Algeria national team. He plays primarily as a centre-back.

== Club career ==
In July 2014, he signed a three-year contract with Tunisian side Club Africain.

In 2019, Belkaroui signed a contract with USM Alger.

In 2020, Belkaroui signed a two-year contract with MC Oran.

In 2021, Belkaroui signed a two-year contract with ES Sétif.

On 5 September 2022, Belkaroui joined Al-Ain.
