= Adem Redjehimi =

Algerian footballer

Personal information
- Full name: Adem Redjehimi
- Date of birth: 20 February 1996 (age 30)
- Place of birth: Constantine, Algeria
- Position: Winger

Youth career
- –2014: CS Constantine
- 2014–2016: S.S.C. Bari

Senior career*
Years	Team	Apps	(Gls)
2016–2017	CS Constantine		
2016–2017	Afro Napoli United		
2019–2020	USM Alger	3	(0)
2020–2021	CS Constantine	0	(0)
2021–2022	USM Annaba	0	(0)
- * Club domestic league appearances and goals as of 30 October 2022

Adem Redjehimi (Arabic: آدم رجيمي; born 7 October 1995) is an Algerian footballer.

== Career ==
In 2019, Adem Redjehimi signed a contract with USM Alger. In 2020, he joined CS Constantine. In 2021, he signed for USM Annaba.
