= Taher Benkhelifa =

Algerian footballer (born 1994)

Personal information
- Full name: Taher Benkhelifa
- Date of birth: 10 June 1994 (age 32)
- Place of birth: Djelfa, Algeria
- Height: 1.70 m (5 ft 7 in)
- Position: Midfielder

Team information
- Current team: NA Hussein Dey
- Number: 8

Youth career
- 2014–2015: Paradou AC

Senior career*
Years	Team	Apps	(Gls)
2015–	Paradou AC	31	(2)
2018–2019	→ JS Kabylie (loan)	29	(0)
2019–2024	USM Alger	102	(3)
2024–	ES Sétif	29	(1)
2025–2026	ES Mostaganem	16	(2)
2026–	NA Hussein Dey	0	(0)

International career
2017	Algeria A'	1	(0)
- * Club domestic league appearances and goals as of 5 June 2026

Taher Benkhelifa (Arabic: طاهر بن خليفة; born 10 June 1994) is an Algerian footballer who plays for NA Hussein Dey.

== Career ==
In the summer of 2018, Benkhelifa signed a one-year loan contract with JS Kabylie.

=== USM Alger ===
On July 1, 2019, Taher Benkhelifa joined USM Alger on a one-season loan after an agreement with Paradou AC management, the Usmist leaders have recovered the former JS Kabylie after a very good season with the Green and Yellow. Benkhelifa made his debut for USM Alger in the season opener against ES Sétif as a starter in a 2–1 win.

On October 23, 2019, Benkhelifa scored his first goal against CA Bordj Bou Arreridj in a match that ended in a 3–0 victory. On September 19, 2020, Benkhelifa continue the adventure with the Reds and Blacks signing a three-year contract, Benkhelifa made a great effort to stay at USMA, whose loan contract expired while President of Paradou AC Kheiredine Zetchi had set the bar too high by asking 3 billion to sell him. The midfielder has decided to waive the arrears owed to him by USMA and thus provide assistance so that USMA officials can redeem his release letter.

At the end of the 2021–22 season, Jamil Benouahi decided to release Benkhelifa for technical reasons. He reached an agreement with officials regarding the amicable separation, while waiting for the signing of his contract termination. Benkhelifa who has had a season far from expectations does not fit into coach's plans. However, with the arrival of a new coach Boualem Charef and his desire to keep him made the difference. Benkhelifa signed a new contract for two seasons.

On June 3, 2023, Benkhelifa won the first title in his football career by winning the 2022–23 CAF Confederation Cup after defeating Young Africans of Tanzania. On 15 September 2023, Benkhelifa won the CAF Super Cup title after winning against Al Ahly, it is the second African title with USM Alger in three months.

=== ES Sétif ===
On 4 February 2024, he joined ES Sétif.

=== ES Mostaganem ===
On 23 July 2025, he joined ES Mostaganem.

== Career statistics ==
=== Club ===
As of 29 January 2024

Club	Season	League			Cup		Continental		Other		Total	
Club	Season	Division	Apps	Goals	Apps	Goals	Apps	Goals	Apps	Goals	Apps	Goals
Paradou AC	2016–17	Ligue 2	26	1	2	0	—		—		28	1
Paradou AC	2017–18	Ligue 1	26	2	0	0	—		—		26	2
Paradou AC	Total		52	3	2	0	—		—		54	3
JS Kabylie	→ 2018–19 (loan)	Ligue 1	28	0	1	0	—		—		29	0
USM Alger	→ 2019–20 (loan)	Ligue 1	18	1	1	0	7 (Note: All appearance(s) in Champions League)	0	—		26	1
USM Alger	2020–21	Ligue 1	33	1	—		—		4 (Note: One appearance in Algerian Super Cup, three appearances in Algerian League Cup)	0	37	1
USM Alger	2021–22	Ligue 1	23	1	—		—		—		23	1
USM Alger	2022–23	Ligue 1	24	0	1	0	13 (Note: All appearance(s) in CAF Confederation Cup)	0	—		38	0
USM Alger	2023–24	Ligue 1	4	0	0	0	6 (Note: one appearance in CAF Super Cup, five appearances in CAF Confederation Cup)	0	—		10	0
Total			102	3	2	0	26	0	4	0	134	3
Career total			182	6	5	0	26	0	4	0	217	6

== Honours ==
USM Alger

- CAF Confederation Cup: 2022–23
- CAF Super Cup: 2023
