= Djamel Ibouzidène =

Algerian footballer (born 1994)

Personal information
- Full name: Djamel Ibouzidène
- Date of birth: January 20, 1994 (age 32)
- Place of birth: Oran, Algeria
- Height: 1.81 m (5 ft 11 1/2 in)
- Position: Defender

Team information
- Current team: US Chaouia
- Number: 17

Youth career
- NRB Bethioua
- 2008–2012: Paradou AC

Senior career*
Years	Team	Apps	(Gls)
2012–2016	Paris FC II	53	(0)
2012–2016	Paris FC	3	(0)
2016–2017	Noisy-le-Sec	9	(2)
2017–2018	ES Sétif	11	(0)
2018–2020	AS Aïn M'lila	40	(1)
2020–2021	WA Tlemcen	26	(3)
2021–2022	NC Magra	15	(0)
2022–2024	MC Oran	35	(1)
2024–2025	RC Kouba		
2025	MSP Batna		
2025	ESM Koléa	13	(0)
2026	MSP Batna	14	(2)
2026–	US Chaouia	0	(0)

International career^{‡}
2012	Algeria U20	1	(0)
- * Club domestic league appearances and goals as of 19 July 2026 ‡ National team caps and goals as of 7 July 2018

Djamel Ibouzidène (Arabic: جمال إيبوزيدن;; born January 20, 1994) is an Algerian footballer who plays for US Chaouia.

== Career ==
On 17 January 2017, he joined ES Sétif. On 3 March 2017, Ibouzidène made his professional debut for ES Sétif as a second-half substitute in a league match against RC Relizane.

In June 2018, Ibouzidène signed for AS Aïn M'lila.

In September 2020, he signed for WA Tlemcen.

In January 2026, he joined MSP Batna.

On 17 July 2026, he joined US Chaouia.

== Honours ==
ES Sétif

- Algerian Ligue Professionnelle 1 (1): 2016–17
