= Mustapha Kheiraoui =

Algerian footballer (born 1995)

Personal information
- Full name: Mustapha Kheiraoui
- Date of birth: 7 October 1995 (age 31)
- Place of birth: Bou Saada, Algeria
- Height: 1.76 m (5 ft 9 in)
- Position: Centre-back

Team information
- Current team: USM Blida
- Number: 4

Youth career
- –2015: A Bou Saada

Senior career*
Years	Team	Apps	(Gls)
2015–2019	A Bou Saada	42	(1)
2019–2020	USM Alger	14	(0)
2020–2021	USM Bel Abbès	14	(0)
2021–2022	NA Hussein Dey	13	(0)
2022–2024	WA Boufarik		
2024–2025	Baish Club		
2025–2026	US Chaouia		
2026–	USM Blida		
- * Club domestic league appearances and goals as of 19 July 2026

Mustapha Kheiraoui (Arabic: مصطفى خيراوي; born 7 October 1995) is an Algerian footballer for USM Blida as a centre back.

== Career ==
In 2019, He signed a contract with USM Alger. In 2020, He signed a contract with USM Bel Abbès. In 2021, he joined NA Hussein Dey. In 2022, he signed for WA Boufarik. In 2025, he signed for US Chaouia.
