= Lyes Oukkal =

Algerian footballer (b. 1991)

Personal information
- Full name: Lyes Oukkal
- Date of birth: 5 November 1991 (age 34)
- Place of birth: Bordj Menaiel, Algeria
- Height: 1.89 m (6 ft 2 in)
- Position: Centre-back

Youth career
- 2010–2012: JS Bordj Ménaïel
- 2012–2013: JS Kabylie

Senior career*
| Years | Team | Apps | (Gls) |
| 2013–2014 | JS Kabylie | | |
| 2014–2016 | IB Lakhdaria | | |
| 2016–2017 | AS Khroub | 16 | (1) |
| 2017–2019 | NA Hussein Dey | 12 | (2) |
| 2019–2020 | USM Alger | 9 | (0) |
| 2020–2023 | JSM Skikda | 21 | (0) |
| 2023–2024 | JS Bordj Ménaïel | | |
| 2024–2025 | HB Chelghoum Laïd | | |
- * Club domestic league appearances and goals as of 10 November 2025

Lyes Oukkal (Arabic: الياس وكال; born 5 November 1991) is an Algerian footballer.

== Career ==
In 2017, he signed for NA Hussein Dey. In 2019, he joined USM Alger. In 2020, he signed for JSM Skikda.
