= Mohamed Walid Tiboutine =

Algerian association football player (born 1991)

Mohamed Tiboutine
Personal information
- Full name: Mohamed Walid Tiboutine
- Date of birth: 28 February 1991 (age 35)
- Place of birth: El Hamadia, Algeria
- Height: 1.77 m (5 ft 10 in)
- Position: Right back

Youth career
- –2011: USM Annaba

Senior career*
Years	Team	Apps	(Gls)
2011–2014	USM Annaba	16	(1)
2014–2015	USMM Hadjout	19	(1)
2015–2019	JS Saoura	85	(1)
2019–2020	USM Alger	6	(0)
2020–2021	RC Kouba	0	(0)
- * Club domestic league appearances and goals as of 3 October 2021

Mohamed Walid Tiboutine (Arabic: محمد وليد تيبوتين; born 28 February 1991) is an Algerian footballer.

== Career ==
In 2015, he joined JS Saoura. In 2019, Tiboutine signed a two-year contract with USM Alger. In 2020, He signed a two-year contract with USM Bel Abbès.
