= 2020–21 USM Alger season =

USM Alger
2020–21 season
- Owner: Groupe SERPORT
- President: Achour Djelloul
- Head coach: François Ciccolini (from 5 August 2020) (until 22 November 2020); Benaraibi Bouziane (c) (from 23 November 2020) (until 12 December 2020); Thierry Froger (from 13 December 2020) (until 7 March 2021); Mounir Zeghdoud (from 8 March 2021)
- Stadium: Omar Hamadi Stadium
- Ligue 1: 4th
- Super Cup: Runners–up
- League Cup: Semi-finals
- Top goalscorer: League: Ismail Belkacemi (16 goals); All: Ismail Belkacemi (17 goals)
- Highest home attendance: 0 (Note: no one can attend games due to the COVID-19 pandemic)
- Lowest home attendance: 0 (Note: no one can attend games due to the COVID-19 pandemic)
- Average home league attendance: 0 (Note: no one can attend games due to the COVID-19 pandemic)
- Biggest win: USM Alger 4–1 JSM Skikda
- Biggest defeat: USM Alger 2–4 CR Belouizdad
Home colours	Away colours

In the 2020–21 season, USM Alger is competing in the Ligue 1 for the 43rd season, as well as the Algerian Cup. It is their 26th consecutive season in the top flight of Algerian football. They competing in Ligue 1, League Cup and the Super Cup.

== Summary season ==
On 13 May, Achour Djelloul announced that he signed with Antar Yahia to be the new sports director for three years and Abdelghani Haddi as a new general manager. Yahia said that he had offers from France, but he preferred the Reds and Blacks project, especially the ideas he wanted to implement are the same as Achour Djelloul. On 6 July, USM Alger singe a two-year contract with Aïn Benian École supérieure d'hôtellerie et restauration d'Alger until the completion of the work of the training center, The contract will allow USM Alger to use the stadium, the swimming pool, the weight room, the hotel, the sports hall, the offices and the recovery and massage room.

On July 20, 2020 FIFA prohibiting USM Alger from any recruitment of Algerian or foreign players during the next three transfer window until the payment of 200,000 euros to the former player Prince Ibara. The next day General Manager Abdelghani Haddi spoke about this problem, and also the problem of the former player Mohamed Yekhlef and the Derby case, Where did Haddi say that he asked the Algerian Football Federation to pay Ibara's money from 2019–20 CAF Champions League prize money.

On 25 July, Mohamed Rabie Meftah stated that he is going to leave USM Alger after Sporting director Antar Yahia told him that the new coach of USM Alger does not want him. Meftah, said he spent nine wonderful years with the club and he played with all of his heart. On 31 July, Abdelghani Haddi spoke about some newspapers and responded to them and the fake news about the value of buying USM Alger's shares, where he said that the amount was 2 billion dinars about 13 million euros, for information SERPORT is a holding company which manages the State's holdings in Algerian port services. It generates a turnover of nearly 500 million euros per year, for a net profit which oscillates between 25 and 40 million euros. On August 5, USM Alger officially announced François Ciccolini as the club's new coach, and his technical staff will be Benaraibi Bouziane as first assistant, the former international Mohamed Benhamou as goalkeepers coach, Nicolas Baup as physical trainer and Sylvain Matrisciano as head of the training center and trainer of the under 21.

On 8 September, USM Alger announced that they had signed a three-year contract with the Italian brand Kappa, they have been the first Algerian club to sign with an original brand company. On 17 September, USM Alger sent a special plane to France to bring the technical staff and five players Guendouz, Beneddine, Akkal, Soula and Abdeldjelil after obtaining a special license from the Algerian authorities. On 30 October, Groupe SERPORT decided to merge the position of Sports Director and General Manager give all powers to Antar Yahia. Djelloul said "We want to avoid mixing things up".

On October 4, The Federal Bureau decided to play Algerian Super Cup Final before the kick-off of the 2020–21 season on 21 November. After a long wait due to the closure of the borders, Zakaria Benchaâ returned to Algeria, Antar Yahia declared that Benchaâ had good abilities and that he would train with the Reserve team, and if his mentality did not align with the team philosophy, he would not be in the club’s squad. After losing the Super Cup final, USM Alger decided to sack François Ciccolini from his post because he did not rise to the podium to receive the medal, which was considered an insult to an official body who was the Prime Minister Abdelaziz Djerad.

On 5 December, USMA agreed with former club coach Thierry Froger to lead the first team for one season after a consultation with Yahia and some lead players. The sports company with shares (SSPA) and the amateur sports club (CSA) signed a partnership agreement on January 31, 2021, this agreement that allows the two parties to comply with Algerian legislative texts, and the amateur club will receive 30 million dinars annually in exchange for carrying the logo and name of the club. On 7 March, due to the poor results Froger and his assistant Bouziane were sacked and replaced by the former coach last season Mounir Zeghdoud. On April 1, USM Alger gets a makeover, the official website of the Italian equipment manufacturer "Kappa" has unveiled the new jerseys that the Usmists will wear this year 2021, This new Kappa jersey is dressed in a dominant white and black, and uses the graphics of the Casbah of Algiers with shades of gray on the front of the jersey. For reasons of comfort and aesthetics, a semi-open round neck is present, just like the iconic Banda Kappa on the shoulders. Four rounds before the end of the season SERPORT decided to dismiss Antar Yahia from his position, Yahia said that all powers were removed and they agreed with a new sports director a while ago. This season witnessed the death of the former player of the sixties Hamid Bernaoui as well as Kamel Tchalabi who played with the club in the seventies and the former coach on four occasions Noureddine Saâdi the last two due to the COVID-19 pandemic in Algeria.

== Squad list ==
Players and squad numbers last updated on 24 August 2021.
Note: Flags indicate national team as has been defined under FIFA eligibility rules. Players may hold more than one non-FIFA nationality.

No.	Name	Nat.	Position	Date of Birth (Age)	Signed in	Contract ends	Signed from	Apps	Goals	Transfer fees
Goalkeepers
1	Lamine Zemmamouche (C.)	(Algeria)	GK	19 March 1985 (aged 35)	2012	2022	(Algeria) MC Alger	400	1	Free transfer
16	Alexis Guendouz	(Algeria)	GK	26 January 1996 (aged 24)	2020	2022	(France) AS Saint-Étienne	14	0	15,000 €
27	Abdelmoumen Sifour	(Algeria)	GK	3 March 1998 (aged 22)	2019	2023	(Algeria) Reserve team	9	0	Youth system
Defenders
2	Houari Baouche	(Algeria)	LB	24 December 1994 (aged 26)	2021	2023	(Algeria) USM Bel Abbès	5	0	Free transfer
3	Abderrahim Hamra	(Algeria)	CB	21 July 1997 (aged 23)	2016	2023	(Algeria) Reserve team	67	3	Youth system
4	Zineddine Belaïd	(Algeria)	CB	20 March 1999 (aged 21)	2020	2024	(Algeria) NA Hussein Dey	36	1	20,000,000 DA
5	Mustapha Bouchina	(Algeria)	CB	10 August 1991 (aged 29)	2020	2022	(Algeria) Paradou AC	35	1	11,000,000 DA
12	Haithem Loucif	(Algeria)	RB	8 July 1996 (aged 24)	2021	2023	(Algeria) Paradou AC	6	0	Undisclosed
19	Saâdi Radouani (Note: Radouani played previously for USM Alger from 2015 to 2016.)	(Algeria)	RB	18 March 1995 (aged 25)	2020	2022	(Algeria) ES Sétif	22	1	Free transfer
20	Mehdi Beneddine	(Algeria)	LB	26 February 1996 (aged 24)	2020	2022	(France) Quevilly-Rouen	34	1	Free transfer
21	Adam Alilet	(Algeria)	CB	17 January 1999 (aged 21)	2019	2024	(Algeria) Reserve team	24	1	Youth system
22	Fateh Achour	(Algeria)	RB	15 August 1994 (aged 26)	2020	2022	(Algeria) USM Bel Abbès	16	0	Free transfer
24	Anis Khemaissia	(Algeria)	LB	27 January 1999 (aged 21)	2019	2024	(Algeria) USM Annaba	20	1	Free transfer
NA	Wassim Ouhab	(Algeria)	CB	7 March 2002 (aged 18)	2020	2023	(Algeria) Reserve team	0	0	Youth system
Midfielders
6	Oussama Chita	(Algeria)	DM	31 October 1996 (aged 24)	2017	2023	(Algeria) MC Alger	85	2	Free transfer
8	Kamel Belarbi	(Algeria)	DM	11 April 1997 (aged 23)	2018	2022	(Algeria) USM El Harrach	30	0	Free transfer
10	Mohamed Reda Boumechra	(Algeria)	AM	3 June 1997 (aged 23)	2019	2023	(Algeria) USM El Harrach	43	2	Loan return
15	Mazire Soula	(Algeria)	AM	6 June 1998 (aged 22)	2020	2022	(France) Angers SCO B	25	2	Free transfer
17	Taher Benkhelifa	(Algeria)	DM	10 June 1994 (aged 26)	2020	2023	(Algeria) Paradou AC	63	2	30,000,000 DA
23	Hamza Koudri (V.C.)	(Algeria)	DM	15 December 1987 (aged 33)	2012	2022	(Algeria) MC Alger	271	15	Free transfer
26	Billel Benhammouda	(Algeria)	AM	28 August 1997 (aged 23)	2016	2023	(Algeria) USMM Hadjout	79	5	Youth system
28	Salim Akkal	(Algeria)	AM	17 February 2000 (aged 20)	2020	2022	(France) Angers SCO B	0	0	Free transfer
31	Mohamed Djenidi	(Algeria)	DM	10 July 2002 (aged 18)	2020	2023	(Algeria) Reserve team	0	0	Youth system
Forwards
7	Ismail Belkacemi	(Algeria)	LW	24 June 1993 (aged 27)	2020	2023	(Algeria) CS Constantine	41	17	Free transfer
9	Zakaria Benchaâ	(Algeria)	ST	11 January 1997 (aged 23)	2020	2021	(Tunisia) CS Sfaxien	44	10	Loan return
11	Abdelkrim Zouari	(Algeria)	RW	14 July 1989 (aged 31)	2018	2021	(Algeria) USM Bel Abbès	72	18	Free transfer
13	Hamed Belem	(Burkina Faso)	RW	24 September 1999 (aged 21)	2021	2023	(Burkina Faso) Rahimo FC	8	1	75,000 €
14	Yacine Aliane	(Algeria)	RW / LW	21 January 1999 (aged 21)	2020	2024	(Algeria) Reserve team	22	2	Youth system
18	Aymen Mahious	(Algeria)	ST	15 September 1997 (aged 23)	2018	2023	(Algeria) AS Aïn M'lila	60	18	Loan return
25	Kwame Opoku	(Ghana)	ST	8 May 1999 (aged 21)	2021	2025	(Ghana) Asante Kotoko	17	5	350,000 €
25	Oussama Abdeldjelil	(Algeria)	CF	23 June 1993 (aged 27)	2020	2023	(France) SO Cholet	4	0	Free transfer
28	Zakaria Naidji	(Algeria)	ST	19 January 1995 (aged 25)	2021	2021	(Algeria) Paradou AC	17	5	Loan
29	Abdelkrim Louanchi	(Algeria)	FW	12 February 2000 (aged 20)	2020	2022	(Algeria) Reserve team	3	0	Youth system
71	Abderraouf Othmani	(Algeria)	FW	14 June 2001 (aged 19)	2020	2023	(Algeria) Reserve team	5	2	Youth system

== Transfers ==
=== In ===
Date	Pos	Player	From club	Transfer fee	Source
18 June 2020	CF	(Algeria) Oussama Abdeldjelil	(France) SO Cholet	Free transfer	
10 July 2020	LB	(Algeria) Mehdi Beneddine	(France) Quevilly-Rouen	Free transfer	
10 July 2020	MF	(Algeria) Salim Akkal	(France) Angers SCO B	Free transfer	
10 July 2020	FW	(Algeria) Mazire Soula	(France) Angers SCO B	Free transfer	
17 August 2020	RB	(Algeria) Saâdi Radouani	ES Sétif	Free transfer	
17 August 2020	RB	(Algeria) Fateh Achour	USM Bel Abbès	Free transfer	
5 September 2020	RW / LW	(Algeria) Yacine Aliane	Reserve team	First Professional Contract	
5 September 2020	RW / LW	(Algeria) Ahmed Bedjaoui	Reserve team	First Professional Contract	
5 September 2020	GK	(Algeria) Zinedine Abassi	Reserve team	First Professional Contract	
5 September 2020	FW	(Algeria) Abdelkrim Louanchi	Reserve team	First Professional Contract	
5 September 2020	DM	(Algeria) Mohamed Djenidi	Reserve team	First Professional Contract	
5 September 2020	CB	(Algeria) Wassim Ouhab	Reserve team	First Professional Contract	
16 September 2020	FW	(Algeria) Ismail Belkacemi	CS Constantine	Free transfer	
19 September 2020	DM	(Algeria) Taher Benkhelifa	Paradou AC	30,000,000 DA	
22 September 2020	GK	(Algeria) Alexis Guendouz	(France) AS Saint-Étienne	15,000 €	
29 September 2020	CB	(Algeria) Mustapha Bouchina	Paradou AC	11,000,000 DA	
1 October 2020	ST	(Algeria) Zakaria Benchaâ	(Tunisia) CS Sfaxien	Loan Return	
11 October 2020	CB	(Algeria) Zineddine Belaïd	NA Hussein Dey	Undisclosed	
31 January 2021	RB	(Algeria) Haithem Loucif	Paradou AC	Undisclosed	
31 January 2021	ST	(Algeria) Zakaria Naidji	Paradou AC	Loan for six months	
31 January 2021	RW	(Burkina Faso) Hamed Belem	(Burkina Faso) Rahimo FC	75,000 €	
15 March 2021	ST	(Ghana) Kwame Opoku	(Ghana) Asante Kotoko	350,000 €	
3 April 2021	LB	(Algeria) Houari Baouche	USM Bel Abbès	Free transfer	

=== Out ===
Date	Pos	Player	To club	Transfer fee	Source
30 June 2020	DM	(Algeria) Taher Benkhelifa	Paradou AC	Loan Return	
25 July 2020	RB	(Algeria) Mohamed Rabie Meftah	Unattached (Note: Meftah joined NA Hussein Dey on 7 September 2020.)	Free transfer	
2 September 2020	AM / LW	(Algeria) Ilyes Yaiche	Unattached (Note: Yaiche joined CS Constantine on 18 September 2020.)	Free transfer (Released)	
20 September 2020	GK	(Algeria) Ismaïl Mansouri	Unattached (Note: Mansouri joined MO Béjaïa on 27 October 2020.)	Free transfer (Released)	
20 September 2020	CB	(Algeria) Hicham Belkaroui	Unattached (Note: Belkaroui joined MC Oran on 22 September 2020.)	Free transfer (Released)	
21 September 2020	AM / LW	(Libya) Muaid Ellafi	Unattached (Note: Ellafi joined Wydad Casablanca on 24 September 2020.)	Free transfer (Released)	
23 September 2020	RB	(Algeria) Mohamed Tiboutine	Unattached (Note: Tiboutine joined USM Bel Abbès on 3 October 2020.)	Free transfer (Released)	
24 September 2020	CB	(Algeria) Mustapha Kheiraoui	Unattached (Note: Kheiraoui joined USM Bel Abbès on 7 October 2020.)	Free transfer (Released)	
30 September 2020	LB	(Algeria) Redouane Cherifi	Unattached (Note: Cherifi joined Ismaily SC on 30 October 2020.)	Free transfer (Released)	
4 October 2020	LW / LB	(Algeria) Oualid Ardji	Unattached	Free transfer (Released)	
4 October 2020	LW	(Algeria) Adem Redjehimi	Unattached (Note: Redjehimi joined CS Constantine on 15 October 2020.)	Free transfer (Released)	
18 October 2020	CB	(Algeria) Lyes Oukkal	Unattached (Note: Oukkal joined JSM Skikda on 20 October 2020.)	Free transfer (Released)	
27 October 2020	FW	(Algeria) Ahmed Bedjaoui	RC Kouba	Loan for one year	
1 November 2020	GK	(Algeria) Zinedine Abassi	RC Arbaâ	Loan for one year	
28 January 2021	CF	(Algeria) Oussama Abdeldjelil	Unattached (Note: Abdeldjelil joined US Boulogne on 31 January 2021.)	Free transfer (Released)	

=== New contracts ===
No.	Pos	Player	Contract length	Contract end	Date	Source
3	CB	(Algeria) Abderrahim Hamra	3 years	2023	24 August 2020	
23	DM	(Algeria) Hamza Koudri	1 year	2021	24 August 2020	
18	ST	(Algeria) Aymen Mahious	2 years	2023	3 September 2020	
1	GK	(Algeria) Lamine Zemmamouche	1 year	2021	13 September 2020	
6	DM	(Algeria) Oussama Chita	3 years	2023	4 November 2020	
21	CB	(Algeria) Adam Alilet	1 year	2024	4 November 2020	
10	DM	(Algeria) Mohamed Reda Boumechra	3 years	2023	5 November 2020	
14	RW / LW	(Algeria) Yacine Aliane	2 years	2024	5 November 2020	
27	GK	(Algeria) Abdelmoumen Sifour	1 year	2023	5 November 2020	
26	FW	(Algeria) Billel Benhammouda	1 year	2023	6 November 2020	
24	LB	(Algeria) Anis Khemaissia	2 years	2024	11 November 2020	

== Pre-season and friendlies ==
25 October 2020 Friendly	USM Alger	Cancelled	US Biskra	Ain Benian
14:00				Stadium: ESHRA

30 October 2020 Friendly	Paradou AC	Cancelled	USM Alger	Hydra
				Stadium: Stade Ahmed Falek

4 November 2020 Friendly	USM Alger	0–0 (Note: The match was played each half for 35 minutes.)	JS Saoura	Zéralda
15:00				Stadium: Zéralda Stadium
Note: Lineup for USM Alger - Guendouz (Sifour 36'), Radouani, Khemaissia, Alilet, Belaïd, Chita (Belarbi 58'), Koudri (Soula 61'), Benkhelifa (Akkal 50'), Boumechra (Belkacemi 36'), Zouari (Aliane 65'), Mahious (Louanchi 63').

8 November 2020 Friendly	USM Alger	1–1	JSM Skikda	Zéralda
16:00	Mahious 16'	Report	Merzougi 62' (pen.)	Stadium: Zéralda Stadium
Note: Lineup for USM Alger - Sifour, Achour, Khemaissia, Alilet, Bouchina, Chita, Koudri, Soula, Belkacemi, Zouari, Mahious.

12 November 2020 Friendly	USM Alger	6–0	Algeria U20	Algiers
10:00	Zouari 12' (pen.); Koudri 36'; Mahious 45'; Abdeldjelil 47' (pen.), 52'; Benhammouda 58'
Note: Lineup for USM Alger - Zemmamouche (Sifour 46'), Radouani (Achour 66'), Khemaissia (Beneddine 58'), Alilet (Belaïd 61'), Bouchina (Chita 66', Akkal 86'), Koudri (Benkhelifa 46'), Belarbi (Hamra 58'), Belkacemi (Soula 74'), Zouari (Aliane 68'), Mahious (Abdeldjelil 46'), Benhammouda (Boumechra 66').

15 November 2020 Friendly	1^{er} Region Militaire	1–1	USM Alger	Blida
14:00			Beneddine 71'
Note: Lineup for USM Alger - Guendouz (Zemmamouche 46'), Achour, Beneddine, Alilet (Hamra 88'), Bouchina, Chita (Benkhelifa 63'), Koudri, Belkacemi (Aliane 67'), Benhammouda (Boumechra 63'), Zouari, Abdeldjelil.

== Competitions ==
=== Overview ===
Competition	Record								Started round	Final position / round	First match	Last match
Competition	G	W	D	L	GF	GA	GD	Win %	Started round	Final position / round	First match	Last match
Ligue 1	38	19	8	11	62	39	+23	50.00	—N/a	4th	28 November 2020	24 August 2021
Super Cup	1	0	0	1	1	2	−1	0.00	Final	Runners–up	21 November 2020	
League Cup	3	2	0	1	4	2	+2	66.67	Round of 16	Semi-finals	8 May 2021	8 June 2021
Total	42	21	8	13	67	43	+24	50.00				

Updated to match played 24 August 2021
Source: Competitions

=== Ligue 1 ===
==== League table ====
Pos	Team	Pld	W	D	L	GF	GA	GD	Pts	Qualification or relegation
2	ES Sétif	38	21	9	8	69	32	+37	71 (Note: On May 16, 2021 after not respecting Covid-19 tests regulation before RC Relizane match, ES Sétif Lost the match 2–0.)	Qualification for Champions League
3	JS Saoura	38	20	9	9	60	30	+30	69 (Note: On March 13, 2021 after the participation of a penalized player Oussama Meddahi against Paradou AC, JS Saoura Lost the match 3–0.)	Qualification for Confederation Cup
4	USM Alger	38	19	8	11	62	39	+23	65	
5	JS Kabylie	38	17	10	11	44	33	+11	61	Qualification for Confederation Cup
6	MC Oran	38	15	15	8	51	37	+14	60	

Updated to match(es) played on 28 August 2021. Source: dzfoot.com
Rules for classification: 1) points; 2) head-to-head points; 3) head-to-head goal difference; 4) goal difference; 5) total goals; 6) fairplay ranking; 7) playoff.

==== Results summary ====
Overall								Home						Away					
Pld	W	D	L	GF	GA	GD	Pts	W	D	L	GF	GA	GD	W	D	L	GF	GA	GD
38	19	8	11	62	39	+23	65	13	2	4	37	18	+19	6	6	7	25	21	+4

Last updated: 24 August 2021.
Source: Competitive matches

==== Results by round ====
Round	1	2	3	4	5	6	7	8	9	10	11	12	13	14	15	16	17	18	19	20	21	22	23	24	25	26	27	28	29	30	31	32	33	34	35	36	37	38
Ground	H	A	A	H	A	H	A	H	A	H	A	H	H	A	H	A	H	A	H	A	H	H	A	H	A	H	A	H	A	H	A	A	H	A	H	A	H	A
Result	L	D	D	L	L	W	W	W	W	W	D	D	L	L	W	L	W	W	W	D	W	W	L	D	L	W	W	W	D	W	D	W	W	L	W	L	L	W
Position	20	18	17	19	19	14	12	10	9	6	6	8	9	10	9	10	10	9	7	7	6	6	6	7	7	6	6	4	4	4	4	4	4	4	4	4	4	4

Updated to match(es) played on 24 August 2021. Source: Competitive matches
A = Away; H = Home; W = Win; D = Draw; L = Loss

==== Matches ====
On 22 October 2020, the Algerian Ligue Professionnelle 1 fixtures were announced.

28 November 2020 Round 1	USM Alger	0–2	ES Sétif	Bologhine
16:00	Abdeldjelil (yellow card) 33'; Soula (yellow card) 59'; Hamra (yellow card) 78'	Soccerway report LFP report	Karaoui (yellow card) 60'; Amoura 87', 90+2' (yellow card) 87'	Stadium: Omar Hamadi Stadium; Attendance: 0 (Note: The match was played behind closed doors due to the COVID-19 pandemic in Algeria.); Referee: Lahlou Benbraham

5 December 2020 Round 2	JS Saoura	2–2	USM Alger	Béchar
14:00	Meddahi (yellow card) 16'; Hamidi 21'; Talah (yellow card) 28'; Messaoudi 55' (pen.); Boubekeur (yellow card) 76'	Soccerway report LFP report	Belaïd (yellow card) 28'; Zouari 51'; Radouani 57'; Bouchina (yellow card) 69'; Mahious (yellow card) 90+3'	Stadium: Stade 20 Août 1955; Attendance: 0 Referee: Mohamed Saïdi

12 December 2020 Round 3	WA Tlemcen	0–0	USM Alger	Tlemcen
15:00	Zenasni (yellow card) 90+2'	Soccerway report LFP report	Bouchina (yellow card) 44'; Guendouz (yellow card) 45+1'; Benchaâ (yellow card) 74'; Benhammouda (yellow card) 90+1'	Stadium: Stade Akid Lotfi; Attendance: 0 Referee: Ahmed Bouzrar

19 December 2020 Round 4	USM Alger	1–3	Olympique de Médéa	Bologhine
14:30	Hamra (yellow card) 8'; Benchaâ (yellow card) 74'; Zouari 84'	Soccerway report LFP report	Laraba (yellow card) 45'; Khalfallah 54', 63' (yellow card) 82'; Taib 58'; Alaoui (yellow card) 79'; Cheurfaoui (yellow card) 85'	Stadium: Omar Hamadi Stadium; Attendance: 0 Referee: Abdelmoumen Touabti

23 December 2020 Round 5	CS Constantine	2–1	USM Alger	Constantine
14:30	Beneddine 27' (o.g.); Belmessaoud (yellow card) 40' (yellow-red card) 60'; Dib (yellow card) 66'; Shibun 90' (pen.); Haddad (yellow card) 90+2'	Soccerway report LFP report	Koudri (yellow card) 45'; Bouchina 56'; Hamra (yellow card) 88'; Chita (yellow card) 89'; Zouari (yellow card) 90+2'	Stadium: Stade Ramdane Benabdelmalek; Attendance: 0 Referee: Malek Ait Ameur

27 December 2020 Round 6	USM Alger	3–0	NA Hussein Dey	Bologhine
15:00	Koudri 44', 75'; Mahious 49'; Hamra (yellow card) 75'	Soccerway report LFP report	Bennai (yellow card) 23'; Sidhoum (yellow card) 32' (yellow-red card) 50'	Stadium: Omar Hamadi Stadium; Attendance: 0 Referee: Mustapha Bessiri

11 January 2021 Round 7	JS Kabylie	1–2	USM Alger	Tizi Ouzou
14:30	Bounoua (yellow card) 44'; Ait Abdessalem (yellow card) 84'; Tubal 90+2'	Soccerway report LFP report	Alilet 7'; Soula (yellow card) 39'; Mahious 68' (yellow card) 69'	Stadium: Stade 1er Novembre 1954; Attendance: 0 Referee: Mehdi Abid Charef

16 January 2021 Round 8	USM Alger	3–1	RC Relizane	Bologhine
15:00	Belkacemi 18'; Koudri 52', 85'	Soccerway report LFP report	Barkat (yellow card) 68'; Aoued 72'; Gharbi (yellow card) 83'	Stadium: Omar Hamadi Stadium; Attendance: 0 Referee: Redouane Necib

22 January 2021 Round 9	CA Bordj Bou Arreridj	0–1	USM Alger	Bordj Bou Arréridj
15:00	Bousmaha (yellow card) 51'; Hammouche (yellow card) 80'	Soccerway report LFP report	Koudri 29'; Bouchina (yellow card) 61'; Alilet (yellow card) 68'; Mahious (yellow card) 85'	Stadium: Stade 20 Août 1955; Attendance: 0 Referee: Houssam Benyahia

26 January 2021 Round 10	USM Alger	2–0	MC Oran	Bologhine
15:00	Benhammouda 51' (yellow card) 80'; Mahious (yellow card) 56'; Soula 66'; Koudri (yellow card) 77'	Soccerway report LFP report	Siam (yellow card) 19'; Mesmoudi (red card) 45+2'; Litim (red card) 60'	Stadium: Omar Hamadi Stadium; Attendance: 0 Referee: Abderrezzak Arab

30 January 2021 Round 11	USM Bel Abbès	1–1	USM Alger	Sidi Bel Abbès
15:00	Belaïd 68' (o.g.); Baouche (yellow card) 32'; Semahi (yellow card) 45' (yellow-red card) 78'	Soccerway report LFP report	Benhammouda (yellow card) 6'; Koudri 82'	Stadium: Stade 24 Fevrier 1956; Attendance: 0 Referee: Malek Ait Ameur

12 February 2021 Round 13	USM Alger	0–1	AS Aïn M'lila	Bologhine
14:30	Hamra (yellow card) 59'	Soccerway report LFP report	Dahar 36'; Debbih (yellow card) 83'	Stadium: Omar Hamadi Stadium; Attendance: 0 Referee: Nabil Boukhalfa

19 February 2021 Round 14	US Biskra	1–0	USM Alger	Biskra
14:30	Khoualed (yellow card) 44'; Salem 51' (yellow card) 53'; Alloui (yellow card) 90+3'	Soccerway report LFP report	Bouchina (yellow card) 23'; Koudri (yellow card) 44'; Guendouz (yellow card) 45+1'; Belem (yellow card) 74'	Stadium: Stade du 18 Février; Attendance: 0 Referee: Abdelmoumen Touabti

26 February 2021 Round 15	USM Alger	3–0	NC Magra	Bologhine
16:00	Demane 1' (o.g.); Mahious 61'; Aliane 77'; Hamra (yellow card) 88'; Koudri (yellow card) 89'	Soccerway report LFP report	Aïb (yellow card) 32'	Stadium: Omar Hamadi Stadium; Attendance: 0 Referee: Mehdi Abid Charef

6 March 2021 Round 16	Paradou AC	2–1	USM Alger	Dar El Beïda
15:00	Benbouali 18'; Kadri (yellow card) 31'; Messibah 59' (pen.); Chebbour (yellow card) 60'; Hadji (yellow card) 71'; Messiad (yellow card) 88'; Zorgane (yellow card) 90'	Soccerway report LFP report	Benchaâ 56' (pen.)	Stadium: Omar Benrabah Stadium; Attendance: 0 Referee: Mustapha Bessiri

13 March 2021 Round 17	USM Alger	3–0	ASO Chlef	Bologhine
15:00	Benchaâ 11'; Belkacemi 14' (pen.), 67'; Boumechra (yellow card) 84'; Alilet (yellow card) 90+3'	Soccerway report LFP report	Baaziz (yellow card) 42'	Stadium: Omar Hamadi Stadium; Attendance: 0 Referee: Abdelali Ibrir

20 March 2021 Round 19	USM Alger	4–1	JSM Skikda	Bologhine
15:00	Belem 8'; Belkacemi 35' (pen.), 63' (pen.); Belaïd (yellow card) 66'; Benkhelifa 90+1'	Soccerway report LFP report	Merzougui 12' (pen.); Nasseri (yellow card) 20'; Belamine (yellow card) 47'; Khennab (yellow card) 66'	Stadium: Omar Hamadi Stadium; Attendance: 0 Referee: Mohamed Saïdi

26 March 2021 Round 12	USM Alger	2–2	MC Alger	Bologhine
20:45	Koudri 4' (yellow card) 63'; Beneddine (yellow card) 30'; Zouari (yellow card) 42'; Belaïd 55'	Soccerway report [ LFP report]	Diomande (yellow card) 23'; Addadi (yellow card) 29'; Benaldjia (yellow card) 34'; Belkheir 45'; Hachoud (yellow card) 77'; Bouchina 80' (o.g.)	Stadium: Omar Hamadi Stadium; Attendance: 0 Referee: Lyés Bekouassa

30 April 2021 Round 18	CR Belouizdad	0–1	USM Alger	Belouizdad
16:00	Khali (yellow card) 53'	Soccerway report LFP report	Radouani (yellow card) 25'; Bouchina (yellow card) 36'; Benchaâ 90+3' (yellow card) 90+3'	Stadium: Stade 20 Août 1955; Attendance: 0 Referee: Youcef Gamouh

4 May 2021 Round 20	ES Sétif	1–1	USM Alger	Sétif
22:30	Debbari (yellow card) 10'; Karaoui (yellow card) 19'; Ghacha 80' (pen.)	Soccerway report LFP report	Benhammouda 56'; Belem (yellow card) 71'	Stadium: Stade 8 Mai 1945; Attendance: 0 Referee: Nabil Boukhalfa

16 May 2021 Round 21	USM Alger	2–0	JS Saoura	Bologhine
17:00	Benkhelifa (yellow card) 25'; Belaïd (yellow card) 34'; Belkacemi 45' (pen.), 73' (yellow card) 90+1'; Zemmamouche (yellow card) 81'; Zouari (yellow card) 82'; Soula (yellow card) 90'	Soccerway report [ LFP report]	Akacem (yellow card) 28'; Boubekeur (yellow card) 43'; Saâd (yellow card) 80'	Stadium: Omar Hamadi Stadium; Attendance: 0 Referee: Abderrezzak Arab

22 May 2021 Round 22	USM Alger	1–0	WA Tlemcen	Bologhine
17:00	Belkacemi 27' (pen.); Zouari (yellow card) 45+1'; Benhammouda (yellow card) 71'	Soccerway report [ LFP report]	Soufi (yellow card) 50'	Stadium: Omar Hamadi Stadium; Attendance: 0 Referee: Abdelmoumen Touabti

26 May 2021 Round 23	Olympique de Médéa	1–0	USM Alger	Médéa
17:00	Kemoukh 15'; Boudoumi (yellow card) 43'; Medjadel (yellow card) 68'; Kenniche (yellow card) 88'; Elghomari (yellow card) 90+2'; Rebiai (yellow card) 90+2'	Soccerway report LFP report	Belarbi (yellow card) 70'; Bouchina (yellow card) 88'	Stadium: Stade Imam Lyes; Attendance: 0 Referee: Said Aouina

30 May 2021 Round 24	USM Alger	0–0	CS Constantine	Bologhine
17:00	Radouani (yellow card) 31'; Belarbi (yellow card) 60'; Benkhelifa (yellow card) 88'	Soccerway report LFP report	Guemroud (yellow card) 38'; Haddad (yellow card) 43'; Dib (yellow card) 84'	Stadium: Omar Hamadi Stadium; Attendance: 0 Referee: Mohamed Boutaraa

23 June 2021 Round 25	NA Hussein Dey	2–1	USM Alger	Belouizdad
17:00	Yaya (yellow card) 30'; Meftah 54' (pen.); Nadji 83'	Soccerway report [ LFP report]	Belaïd (yellow card) 53'; Opoku (yellow card) 71'; Soula 81'	Stadium: Stade 20 Août 1955; Attendance: 0 Referee: Lyés Bekouassa

27 June 2021 Round 27	RC Relizane	2–4	USM Alger	Relizane
17:00	Chadli 34'; Zaidi (yellow card) 55'; Gharbi 62'	Soccerway report LFP report	Belkacemi 10'; Bouchina (yellow card) 32'; Zemmamouche (yellow card) 39'; Zouari 45' (pen.); Opoku 57' (pen.); Koudri (yellow card) 66'; Koulkheir 80' (o.g.)	Stadium: Stade Tahar Zoughari; Attendance: 0 Referee: Bilal Bendjahene

1 July 2021 Round 28	USM Alger	3–1	CA Bordj Bou Arreridj	Bologhine
20:00	Opoku 17'; Hamra 57'; Belkacemi 78'	Soccerway report LFP report	Lalaoui 19'; Maddour (yellow card) 55'	Stadium: Omar Hamadi Stadium; Attendance: 0 Referee: Malek Ait Ameur

4 July 2021 Round 29	MC Oran	1–1	USM Alger	Oran
17:00	Belloumi (yellow card) 71'; Benhamou 82'	Soccerway report LFP report	Belkacemi 11' (pen.); Achour (yellow card) 37'; Koudri (yellow card) 45'; Bouchina (red card) 68'	Stadium: Ahmed Zabana Stadium; Attendance: 0 Referee: Youcef Gamouh

8 July 2021 Round 30	USM Alger	3–1	USM Bel Abbès	Bologhine
21:00	Naidji 5'; Zouari 32'; Belkacemi 66'	Soccerway report LFP report	Mouaki 13' (pen.); Metref (yellow card) 18'; Ounnas (yellow card) 30'; Hamza (yellow card) 90+3'	Stadium: Omar Hamadi Stadium; Attendance: 0 Referee: Said Aouina

13 July 2021 Round 31	MC Alger	2–2	USM Alger	Algiers
21:00	Abdelhafid 27', 45+4'; Brahimi (yellow card) 40'; Rebiai (yellow card) 87'	Soccerway report LFP report	Koudri (yellow card) 29'; Zouari 49'; Belkacemi 72' (pen.)	Stadium: Stade du 5 Juillet; Attendance: 0 Referee: Mustapha Ghorbal

17 July 2021 Round 32	AS Aïn M'lila	0–3	USM Alger	Aïn M'lila
20:30	Demane (penalty missed) 36'	Soccerway report LFP report	Opoku 29'; Belkacemi (yellow card) 35'; Naidji 51'; Aliane 87'	Stadium: Touhami Zoubir Khelifi Stadium; Attendance: 0 Referee: Mohamed Boutaraa

23 July 2021 Round 33	USM Alger	2–1	US Biskra	Bologhine
20:30	Naidji 65', 84'	Soccerway report LFP report	Chibane 24' (yellow card) 53'; Lakhdari (yellow card) 44'	Stadium: Omar Hamadi Stadium; Attendance: 0 Referee: Mehdi Abid Charef

27 July 2021 Round 34	NC Magra	2–1	USM Alger	Magra
17:45	Bouchouareb 9'; Fegaâs 30'	Soccerway report [ LFP report]	Zouari 5'	Stadium: Boucheligue Brothers Stadium; Attendance: 0 Referee: Ahmed Bouzrar

3 August 2021 Round 26	USM Alger	1–0	JS Kabylie	Bologhine
21:00	Belkacemi (penalty missed) 17' 48'; Zouari (yellow card) 52'; Achour (yellow card) 82'; Benkhelifa (yellow card) 90+2'	Soccerway report LFP report	Tizi Bouali (yellow card) 73'; Tubal (yellow card) 90+2'	Stadium: Omar Hamadi Stadium; Attendance: 0 Referee: Youcef Gamouh

9 August 2021 Round 35	USM Alger	2–1	Paradou AC	Bologhine
21:00	Zouari 9' (pen.); Benhammouda (yellow card) 16'; Benkhelifa (yellow card) 34'; Bouchina (yellow card) 63'; Opoku (penalty missed) 86' 90+3'	Soccerway report [ LFP report]	Redjem (yellow card) 6'; Zerrouki (yellow card) 44'; Douar (red card) 85'; Bouzok 89'	Stadium: Omar Hamadi Stadium; Attendance: 0 Referee: Hamza Bouslimani

16 August 2021 Round 36	ASO Chlef	1–0	USM Alger	Chlef
21:00	Meddah 43'; Zahzouh (yellow card) 74'; Alaouchiche (yellow card) 90+1'	Soccerway report [ LFP report]	Hamra (yellow card) 57'; Zemmamouche (yellow card) 86'	Stadium: Stade Mohamed Boumezrag; Attendance: 0 Referee: Farouk Mial

21 August 2021 Round 37	USM Alger	2–4	CR Belouizdad	Bologhine
21:00	Hamra (yellow card) 46' (goal) 60'; Benhammouda (yellow card) 65'; Othmani 83'	Soccerway report [ LFP report]	Sayoud 11', 45' (yellow card) 45+1'; Khalfallah 30'; Draoui (yellow card) 44'; Mrezigue 74'; Keddad (yellow card) 86'	Stadium: Omar Hamadi Stadium; Attendance: 0 Referee: Abdelmoumen Touabti

24 August 2021 Round 38	JSM Skikda	0–3	USM Alger	Skikda
17:30		Soccerway report [ LFP report]	Belkacemi 31', 81'; Othmani 35'	Stadium: Stade 20 Août 1955; Attendance: 0 Referee: Abdelkarim Bendebiza

=== Algerian Super Cup ===
21 November 2020	USM Alger	1–2	CR Belouizdad	Algiers
20:30	Mahious 60'; Benkhelifa (yellow card) 90+1'	Report	Sayoud 10' (pen.) (yellow card) 90+2'; Koukpo 33'; Nessakh (yellow card) 45'	Stadium: Stade du 5 Juillet; Attendance: 0 (close doors); Referee: Youcef Gamouh

=== Algerian League Cup ===
8 May 2021 Round of 16	USM Alger	2–0	MC Alger	Bologhine
22:30	Opoku 19'; Benhammouda (yellow card) 53'; Naidji 90+2' Zemmamouche, Loucif (substituted off) 77' (Alilet, (substituted on) 77'), Beneddine, Bouchina (substituted off) 60' (Radouani, (substituted on) 60'), Belaïd, Hamra, Benkhelifa, Benhammouda (substituted off) 77' (Boumechra, (substituted on) 77'), Belkacemi, Belem (substituted off) 60' (Zouari, (substituted on) 60'), Opoku (substituted off) 77' (Naidji, (substituted on) 77').	Report	Bourdim (yellow card) 72'; Diomande (yellow card) 85'; Rebiai (red card) 90+4' Chaâl, Hachoud (substituted off) 25' (Merouani, (substituted on) 25'), Lamara, Hadded (substituted off) 66' (Isla, (substituted on) 66'), Rebiai, Addadi, Harrag, Bourdim, Bensaha, Belkheir, Esso.	Stadium: Omar Hamadi Stadium; Attendance: 0 (Note: The match was played behind closed doors due to the COVID-19 pandemic in Algeria.); Referee: Lotfi Bekouassa

4 June 2021 Quarter-finals	USM Alger	1–0	Olympique de Médéa	Bologhine
17:00	Benkhelifa (yellow card) 17'; Belkacemi 34' (yellow card) 84'; Belaïd (yellow card) 61'	Report	Ladjabi (yellow card) 56'; Cheurfaoui (yellow card) 59'	Stadium: Omar Hamadi Stadium; Attendance: 0 Referee: Lahlou Benbraham
Note: Lineup for USM Alger - Zemmamouche, Belaïd, Bouchina, Radouani, Beneddine, Chita (Hamra, 90'), Benkhelifa, Benhammouda, Belkacemi, Benchaâ (Zouari, 81'), Naidji.

8 June 2021 Semi-finals	NC Magra	2–1 (a.e.t.)	USM Alger	Magra
16:00	Ziouache 40'; Madani (yellow card) 52'; Driss (yellow card) 90+7'; Bourahla 110' (yellow card) 110'	Report	Benkhelifa (yellow card) 90+3'; Beneddine 90+10' (pen.); Belaïd (yellow card) 115'	Stadium: Boucheligue Brothers Stadium; Attendance: 0 Referee: Mehdi Abid Charef
Note: Lineup for USM Alger - Zemmamouche, Belaïd, Bouchina, Radouani (Aliane, 75'), Beneddine, Chita (Soula, 67'), Benkhelifa, Benhammouda (Boumechra, 82'), Belkacemi, Benchaâ, Naidji (Hamra, 67').

== Squad information ==
=== Appearances and goals ===
No.	Pos	Player	Nat	Ligue 1			Super Cup			League Cup			Total		
No.	Pos	Player	Nat	App	St	G	App	St	G	App	St	G	App	St	G
Goalkeepers
1	GK	Mohamed Lamine Zemmamouche	(Algeria)	18	18	0	0	0	0	3	3	0	21	21	0
16	GK	Alexis Guendouz	(Algeria)	13	12	0	1	1	0	0	0	0	14	13	0
27	GK	Abdelmoumen Sifour	(Algeria)	8	8	0	0	0	0	0	0	0	8	8	0
NA	GK	Abdellah Zakaria Saouchi (Note: Player from USM Alger Reserve)	(Algeria)	1	0	0	0	0	0	0	0	0	1	0	0
Defenders
2	DF	Houari Baouche	(Algeria)	5	2	0	0	0	0	0	0	0	5	2	0
3	DF	Abderrahim Hamra	(Algeria)	31	25	2	1	0	0	3	1	0	35	26	2
4	DF	Zineddine Belaïd	(Algeria)	33	29	1	0	0	0	3	3	0	36	32	1
5	DF	Mustapha Bouchina	(Algeria)	31	30	1	1	1	0	3	3	0	35	34	1
12	DF	Haithem Loucif	(Algeria)	6	4	0	0	0	0	1	1	0	7	5	0
19	DF	Saâdi Radouani	(Algeria)	17	12	1	0	0	0	2	1	0	19	13	1
20	DF	Mehdi Beneddine	(Algeria)	30	30	0	1	1	0	3	3	0	34	34	0
21	DF	Adam Alilet	(Algeria)	13	9	1	1	1	0	1	0	0	15	10	1
22	DF	Fateh Achour	(Algeria)	16	15	0	0	0	0	0	0	0	16	15	0
24	DF	Anis Khemaissia	(Algeria)	4	4	0	1	1	0	0	0	0	5	5	0
NA	DF	Mohamed Bensaid	(Algeria)	1	1	0	0	0	0	0	0	0	1	1	0
Midfielders
6	MF	Oussama Chita	(Algeria)	18	14	0	1	1	0	2	2	0	21	17	0
8	MF	Kamel Belarbi	(Algeria)	7	4	0	0	0	0	0	0	0	7	4	0
10	MF	Mohamed Reda Boumechra	(Algeria)	19	7	0	0	0	0	2	0	0	21	7	0
15	MF	Mazire Soula	(Algeria)	25	15	2	0	0	0	1	0	0	26	15	2
17	MF	Taher Benkhelifa	(Algeria)	33	24	1	1	0	0	3	3	0	37	27	1
23	MF	Hamza Koudri	(Algeria)	28	27	7	1	1	0	0	0	0	29	28	7
26	MF	Billel Benhammouda	(Algeria)	32	22	2	1	1	0	3	3	0	36	26	2
31	MF	Mohamed Djenidi	(Algeria)	0	0	0	0	0	0	0	0	0	0	0	0
Forwards
7	FW	Ismail Belkacemi	(Algeria)	37	36	16	1	1	0	3	3	1	41	40	17
9	FW	Zakaria Benchaâ	(Algeria)	15	7	3	0	0	0	2	2	0	17	9	3
11	FW	Abdelkrim Zouari	(Algeria)	28	26	7	1	1	0	2	0	0	31	27	7
13	FW	Hamed Belem	(Burkina Faso)	7	3	1	0	0	0	1	1	0	8	4	1
14	FW	Yacine Aliane	(Algeria)	20	1	2	0	0	0	1	0	0	21	1	2
18	FW	Aymen Mahious	(Algeria)	11	10	3	1	1	1	0	0	0	12	11	4
25	FW	Kwame Opoku	(Ghana)	16	15	4	0	0	0	1	1	1	17	16	5
28	FW	Zakaria Naidji	(Algeria)	14	6	4	0	0	0	3	1	1	17	7	5
29	FW	Abdelkrim Louanchi	(Algeria)	3	0	0	0	0	0	0	0	0	3	0	0
71	FW	Abderraouf Othmani	(Algeria)	5	1	2	0	0	0	0	0	0	5	1	2
Players transferred out during the season
~~25~~	FW	Oussama Abdeldjelil	(Algeria)	3	2	0	1	0	0	0	0	0	4	2	0
Total				38		62	1		1	3		4	42		67

Last updated: 17 June 2022
Source: soccerway.com

=== Disciplinary record ===
No.	Pos.	Player	Ligue 1			Super Cup			League Cup			Total		
No.	Pos.	Player	Yellow card	(yellow card) (yellow-red card)	Red card	Yellow card	(yellow card) (yellow-red card)	Red card	Yellow card	(yellow card) (yellow-red card)	Red card	Yellow card	(yellow card) (yellow-red card)	Red card
1	GK	(Algeria) Mohamed Lamine Zemmamouche	3	0	0	0	0	0	0	0	0	3	0	0
16	GK	(Algeria) Alexis Guendouz	2	0	0	0	0	0	0	0	0	2	0	0
3	DF	(Algeria) Abderrahim Hamra	8	0	0	0	0	0	0	0	0	8	0	0
4	DF	(Algeria) Zineddine Belaïd	4	0	0	0	0	0	2	0	0	6	0	0
5	DF	(Algeria) Mustapha Bouchina	8	0	1	0	0	0	0	0	0	8	0	1
19	DF	(Algeria) Saâdi Radouani	2	0	0	0	0	0	0	0	0	2	0	0
20	DF	(Algeria) Mehdi Beneddine	1	0	0	0	0	0	0	0	0	1	0	0
21	DF	(Algeria) Adam Alilet	2	0	0	0	0	0	0	0	0	2	0	0
22	DF	(Algeria) Fateh Achour	2	0	0	0	0	0	0	0	0	2	0	0
6	MF	(Algeria) Oussama Chita	1	0	0	0	0	0	0	0	0	1	0	0
8	MF	(Algeria) Kamel Belarbi	2	0	0	0	0	0	0	0	0	2	0	0
10	MF	(Algeria) Mohamed Reda Boumechra	1	0	0	0	0	0	0	0	0	1	0	0
15	MF	(Algeria) Mazire Soula	3	0	0	0	0	0	0	0	0	3	0	0
17	MF	(Algeria) Taher Benkhelifa	4	0	0	1	0	0	2	0	0	7	0	0
23	MF	(Algeria) Hamza Koudri	8	0	0	0	0	0	0	0	0	8	0	0
26	MF	(Algeria) Billel Benhammouda	6	0	0	0	0	0	1	0	0	7	0	0
7	FW	(Algeria) Ismail Belkacemi	2	0	0	0	0	0	1	0	0	3	0	0
9	FW	(Algeria) Zakaria Benchaâ	3	0	0	0	0	0	0	0	0	3	0	0
11	FW	(Algeria) Abdelkrim Zouari	5	0	0	0	0	0	0	0	0	5	0	0
13	FW	(Burkina Faso) Hamed Belem	2	0	0	0	0	0	0	0	0	2	0	0
18	FW	(Algeria) Aymen Mahious	4	0	0	0	0	0	0	0	0	4	0	0
~~25~~	FW	(Algeria) Oussama Abdeldjelil	1	0	0	0	0	0	0	0	0	1	0	0
25	FW	(Ghana) Kwame Opoku	1	0	0	0	0	0	0	0	0	1	0	0
Total			76	0	1	1	0	0	6	0	0	83	0	1

=== Goalscorers ===
Includes all competitive matches. The list is sorted alphabetically by surname when total goals are equal.

No.	Nat.	Player	Pos.	L 1	SC	LC	TOTAL
7	(Algeria)	Ismail Belkacemi	FW	16	0	1	17
23	(Algeria)	Hamza Koudri	DM	7	0	0	7
11	(Algeria)	Abdelkrim Zouari	RW	7	0	0	7
25	(Ghana)	Kwame Opoku	ST	4	0	1	5
28	(Algeria)	Zakaria Naidji	ST	4	0	1	5
18	(Algeria)	Aymen Mahious	ST	3	1	0	4
9	(Algeria)	Zakaria Benchaâ	ST	3	0	0	3
26	(Algeria)	Billel Benhammouda	AM	2	0	0	2
15	(Algeria)	Mazire Soula	FW	2	0	0	2
14	(Algeria)	Yacine Aliane	RW / LW	2	0	0	2
3	(Algeria)	Abderrahim Hamra	CB	2	0	0	2
71	(Algeria)	Abderraouf Othmani	FW	2	0	0	2
19	(Algeria)	Saâdi Radouani	RB	1	0	0	1
5	(Algeria)	Mustapha Bouchina	CB	1	0	0	1
21	(Algeria)	Adam Alilet	CB	1	0	0	1
13	(Burkina Faso)	Hamed Belem	RW	1	0	0	1
17	(Algeria)	Taher Benkhelifa	DM	1	0	0	1
4	(Algeria)	Zineddine Belaïd	CB	1	0	0	1
20	(Algeria)	Mehdi Beneddine	LB	0	0	1	1
Own Goals				2	0	0	2
Totals				62	1	4	67

=== Penalties ===
Date	Nation	Name	Opposition	Scored?
6 March 2021	(Algeria)	Zakaria Benchaâ	Paradou AC	✓
13 March 2021	(Algeria)	Ismail Belkacemi	ASO Chlef	✓
20 March 2021	(Algeria)	Ismail Belkacemi	JSM Skikda	✓
20 March 2021	(Algeria)	Ismail Belkacemi	JSM Skikda	✓
16 May 2021	(Algeria)	Ismail Belkacemi	JS Saoura	✓
22 May 2021	(Algeria)	Ismail Belkacemi	WA Tlemcen	✓
8 June 2021	(Algeria)	Mehdi Beneddine	NC Magra	✓
27 June 2021	(Algeria)	Abdelkrim Zouari	RC Relizane	✓
27 June 2021	(Ghana)	Kwame Opoku	RC Relizane	✓
4 July 2021	(Algeria)	Ismail Belkacemi	MC Oran	✓
13 July 2021	(Algeria)	Ismail Belkacemi	MC Alger	✓
3 August 2021	(Algeria)	Ismail Belkacemi	JS Kabylie	Penalty missed
9 August 2021	(Algeria)	Abdelkrim Zouari	Paradou AC	✓
9 August 2021	(Ghana)	Kwame Opoku	Paradou AC	Penalty missed

=== Clean sheets ===
Includes all competitive matches.

No.	Nat	Name	L 1	SC	LC	Total
1	(Algeria)	Mohamed Lamine Zemmamouche	6	0	2	8
16	(Algeria)	Alexis Guendouz	4	0	0	4
27	(Algeria)	Abdelmoumen Sifour	2	0	0	2
		TOTALS	12	0	2	14

As of 24 August 2021
