= List of Algerian football transfers summer 2022 =

This is a list of Algerian football transfers in the 2022 summer transfer window by club. Clubs in the 2022–23 Algerian Ligue Professionnelle 1 are included.

== Ligue Professionnelle 1 ==
=== ASO Chlef ===
In: Note: Flags indicate national team as defined under FIFA eligibility rules; some limited exceptions apply. Players may hold more than one non-FIFA nationality.

No.	Pos.	Nation	Player
—	MF	BOT	Gape Mohutsiwa (from (Botswana) Jwaneng Galaxy)
—	FW	TUN	Slim Jendoubi (from (Tunisia) CA Bizertin)
—	FW	ALG	Mohamed Benbournane (from (Algeria) MC Alger)
—	DF	ALG	Fateh Achour (from (Algeria) USM Alger)
—	MF	ALG	Kamel Belarbi (from (Algeria) USM Alger)
—	DF	ALG	Chemseddine Nessakh (from (Algeria) CR Belouizdad)
—	FW	ALG	Toufik Addadi (from (Tunisia) US Monastir)
—	DF	ALG	Rabah Aich (from (Algeria) RC Relizane)
—	FW	ALG	Ibrahim Morsli (Loan from (Algeria) MC Alger)
—	DF	ALG	Ahmed Kerroum (from (Algeria) JS Kabylie)
—	MF	ALG	Redouane Bounoua (from (Algeria) WA Tlemcen)

Out: Note: Flags indicate national team as defined under FIFA eligibility rules; some limited exceptions apply. Players may hold more than one non-FIFA nationality.

No.	Pos.	Nation	Player
—	MF	ALG	Khalid Dahamni (to (Algeria) MC Alger)
—	MF	ALG	Khathir Baaziz (to (Algeria) JS Saoura)
—	FW	ALG	Mostapha Alili (to (Algeria) JS Kabylie)
—	MF	ALG	Mohamed Bengrina (to (Algeria) MC Oran)
—	DF	ALG	Senoussi Fourloul (to (Algeria) MC Oran)
—	DF	ALG	Abdellah Meddah (to (Algeria) SC Mécheria)
—	DF	ALG	Farouk Benmaarouf (to (Algeria) ES Mostaganem)
—	DF	ALG	Khalfallah Belhaoua (to (Algeria) ES Mostaganem)
—	DF	ALG	Abdellah Meddah (to (Algeria) USM Khenchela)
—	DF	ALG	Houssem Meharzi (Unattached)
—	FW	ALG	Youcef Narbesla (Unattached)
—	FW	ALG	Abdelaziz Litt (to (Algeria) HB Chelghoum Laïd)
—	DF	ALG	Abdelkadir Bensalah (Unattached)

=== CR Belouizdad ===
In: Note: Flags indicate national team as defined under FIFA eligibility rules; some limited exceptions apply. Players may hold more than one non-FIFA nationality.

No.	Pos.	Nation	Player
—	FW	ALG	Idriss Saadi (from (France) SC Bastia)
—	GK	ALG	Alexis Guendouz (from (Algeria) USM Alger)
—	GK	ALG	Redouane Maachou (Loan return from (Algeria) USM Bel Abbès)
—	MF	ALG	Islam Bouloudène (from (Algeria) NA Hussein Dey)
—	DF	ALG	Aimen Bouguerra (from (Algeria) Paradou AC)
—	DF	ALG	Mouad Hadded (from (Algeria) MC Alger)
—	DF	ALG	Youcef Laouafi (from (Tunisia) ES Sahel)
—	FW	ALG	Leonel Wamba (from (Latvia) FK Spartaks Jūrmala)
—	MF	ALG	Belaid Hamidi (from (Algeria) JS Saoura)
—	FW	ALG	Ishak Boussouf (Loan from (Belgium) Lommel)
—	DF	ALG	Miloud Rebiai (from (Algeria) MC Alger)
—	DF	ALG	Abdelmoumen Chikhi (from (Algeria) JS Kabylie)
—	FW	ALG	Ahmedine Daoudi (from (France) Stade Beaucairois)
—	FW	NGA	Anayo Iwuala (Loan from (Tunisia) ES Tunis)
—	GK	ALG	Azzedine Doukha (from (Algeria) JS Kabylie)

Out: Note: Flags indicate national team as defined under FIFA eligibility rules; some limited exceptions apply. Players may hold more than one non-FIFA nationality.

No.	Pos.	Nation	Player
—	FW	ALG	Bouzid Dadache (Unattached)
—	FW	ALG	Mahi Benhamou (Unattached)
—	FW	ALG	Khaled Bousseliou (to (Algeria) USM Alger)
—	MF	ALG	Larbi Tabti (to (Algeria) ES Sétif)
—	DF	ALG	Chemseddine Nessakh (to (Algeria) ASO Chlef)
—	FW	ALG	Kheireddine Merzougui (to (Algeria) MC Alger)
—	DF	ALG	Sabri Cheraitia (to (Algeria) JS Kabylie)
—	DF	ALG	Chems-Eddine Bekkouche (Loan to (Spain) Levante UD)
—	MF	ALG	Adel Djerrar (to (Algeria) MC Oran)
—	GK	ALG	Toufik Moussaoui (to (Morocco) OC Khouribga)

=== CS Constantine ===
In: Note: Flags indicate national team as defined under FIFA eligibility rules; some limited exceptions apply. Players may hold more than one non-FIFA nationality.

No.	Pos.	Nation	Player
—	DF	ALG	Mohamed Amine Madani (from (Algeria) NC Magra)
—	FW	ALG	Ahmed Khaldi (from (Algeria) HB Chelghoum Laïd)
—	DF	ALG	Oussama Meddahi (from (Algeria) NA Hussein Dey)
—	MF	ALG	Salaheddine Harrari (from (Algeria) HB Chelghoum Laïd)
—	DF	ALG	Nasreddine Zaalani (from (Saudi Arabia) Al-Kholood)
—	FW	ALG	Hamza Demane (from (Algeria) HB Chelghoum Laïd)
—	FW	ALG	Abdelhak Abdelhafid (from (Algeria) MC Alger)

Out: Note: Flags indicate national team as defined under FIFA eligibility rules; some limited exceptions apply. Players may hold more than one non-FIFA nationality.

No.	Pos.	Nation	Player
—	DF	ALG	Mohamed Guemroud (to (Algeria) JS Kabylie)
—	DF	ALG	Yassine Salhi (to (Algeria) JS Kabylie)
—	FW	ALG	Chouaib Debbih (to (Algeria) MC Alger)
—	FW	ALG	Hamza Belahouel (to (Algeria) Unattached)
—	FW	ALG	Okacha Hamzaoui (to (United Arab Emirates) Al-Fujairah SC)
—	FW	ALG	Mohamed Itim (to (Algeria) Unattached)
—	GK	ALG	Hatem Bencheikh El Fegoun (to (Algeria) Unattached)

=== ES Sétif ===
In: Note: Flags indicate national team as defined under FIFA eligibility rules; some limited exceptions apply. Players may hold more than one non-FIFA nationality.

No.	Pos.	Nation	Player
—	MF	CMR	Andre Ulrich Zanga (from (Cameroon) PWD Bamenda)
—	MF	ALG	Ayoub Tazouti (from (Bulgaria) FC Sportist Svoge)
—	DF	ALG	Ilias Hassani (from (Qatar) Al-Shahania SC)
—	DF	ALG	Mohamed Riad Hmida (from (Algeria) JS Bordj Ménaïel)
—	MF	ALG	Larbi Tabti (from (Algeria) CR Belouizdad)
—	FW	ALG	Zerroug Boucif (Loan from (Algeria) Paradou AC)
—	DF	ALG	Mohamed Amar Boudouh (from (Algeria) ASM Oran)
—	FW	ALG	Ghiles Guenaoui (from (Algeria) Paradou AC)
—	MF	ALG	Chahreddine Boukholda (from (Portugal) Mafra)
—	GK	ALG	Mohamed Lotfi Anis Osmani (Unattached)
—	FW	ALG	Abdelhak Haskar (from (Algeria) RC Kouba)
—	DF	ALG	Islem Chebbour (from (Algeria) Paradou AC)
—	DF	ALG	Kheireddine Benamrane (from (Algeria) HB Chelghoum Laïd)
—	DF	ALG	Drice Chaabi (from (Belgium) Francs Borains)
—	MF	ALG	Youcef Serraoui (from (Algeria) MC Saïda)
—	FW	ALG	Mohamed Aimen Akziz (from (Algeria) NA Hussein Dey)
—	DF	ALG	Hamza Salem (from (Algeria) US Biskra)
—	FW	ALG	Walid Zamoum (from (Algeria) JSM Béjaïa)
—	DF	ALG	Kousseila Temericht (from (Algeria) NA Hussein Dey)
—	MF	ALG	Bassam Chaouti (from (Algeria) MC Oran)
—	DF	ALG	Tarek Belouchat (from (Algeria) Olympique de Médéa)
—	FW	CIV	Alassane Razak Keita (from (Kosovo) SC Gjilani)
—	MF	CMR	Duval Wapiwo (from (Libya) Al-Madina SC)
—	MF	ALG	Nassim Yettou (Unattached)
—	FW	NGA	Godwin Chika (from (Iraq) Al-Shorta SC)

Out: Note: Flags indicate national team as defined under FIFA eligibility rules; some limited exceptions apply. Players may hold more than one non-FIFA nationality.

No.	Pos.	Nation	Player
—	DF	ALG	Houari Ferhani (to (Algeria) MC Alger)
—	FW	ALG	Riad Benayad (Loan return to (Algeria) Paradou AC)
—	DF	ALG	Abdelhak Debbari (to (Algeria) HB Chelghoum Laïd)
—	FW	ALG	Monsef Bakrar (to (Croatia) NK Istra)
—	GK	ALG	Sofiane Khedairia (to (Saudi Arabia) Al-Shoulla FC)
—	DF	ALG	Hocine Laribi (to (Saudi Arabia) Al-Shoulla FC)
—	FW	ALG	Khalil Darfalou (to (Algeria) USM Alger)
—	DF	ALG	Abdelkrim Nemdil (Unattached)
—	DF	ALG	Ilias Hassani (Unattached)
—	MF	ALG	Ayoub Tazouti (Unattached)
—	DF	ALG	Mohamed Riad Hmida (Unattached)
—	DF	ALG	Mohamed Amar Boudouh (Unattached)
—	MF	ALG	Abdelkader Boutiche (to (Tunisia) US Monastir)
—	FW	LBY	Ibrahim Bodabous (Unattached)
—	DF	ALG	Younes Abdelhak Ouassaa (to (Algeria) MC El Bayadh)
—	MF	ALG	Chahreddine Boukholda (Unattached)
—	MF	ALG	Ibrahim Farhi Benhalima (to (Morocco) MC Oujda)
—	MF	ALG	Akram Djahnit (to (Algeria) USM Alger)
—	MF	CMR	Andre Ulrich Zanga (Unattached)
—	MF	CIV	Alassane Razak Keita (Unattached)
—	FW	ALG	Zoubir Motrani (to (Algeria) MC Oran)
—	MF	ALG	Abderrahim Deghmoum (to (Egypt) Al Masry SC)
—	MF	ALG	Amir Karaoui (to (Algeria) HB Chelghoum Laïd)
—	MF	ALG	Amine Benbelaid (to (Algeria) CR Témouchent)

=== HB Chelghoum Laïd ===
In: Note: Flags indicate national team as defined under FIFA eligibility rules; some limited exceptions apply. Players may hold more than one non-FIFA nationality.

No.	Pos.	Nation	Player
—	MF	ALG	Amir Karaoui (from (Algeria) ES Sétif)
—	DF	ALG	Abdelhak Debbari (from (Algeria) ES Sétif)

Out: Note: Flags indicate national team as defined under FIFA eligibility rules; some limited exceptions apply. Players may hold more than one non-FIFA nationality.

No.	Pos.	Nation	Player
—	FW	ALG	Ahmed Khaldi (to (Algeria) CS Constantine)
—	MF	ALG	Salaheddine Harrari (to (Algeria) CS Constantine)
—	FW	ALG	Hamza Demane (to (Algeria) CS Constantine)
—	FW	ALG	Abdelkader Kaibou (to (Morocco) MC Oujda)

=== JS Kabylie ===
In: Note: Flags indicate national team as defined under FIFA eligibility rules; some limited exceptions apply. Players may hold more than one non-FIFA nationality.

No.	Pos.	Nation	Player
—	DF	ALG	Mohamed Guemroud (from (Algeria) CS Constantine)
—	DF	ALG	Yassine Salhi (from (Algeria) CS Constantine)
—	DF	ALG	Rayan Senhadji (from (Denmark) Jammerbugt)
—	MF	ALG	Kaïs Nasri (from (Italy) Lazio)
—	FW	BFA	Zakaria Sanogo (from Ararat-Armenia)
—	MF	ALG	Lyes Benyoucef (from (Tunisia) ES Sahel)
—	MF	ALG	Noufel Ould Hamou (from (Algeria) RC Relizane)
—	FW	ALG	Mostapha Alili (from (Algeria) ASO Chlef)
—	FW	ALG	Redouane Zerdoum (from (Tunisia) Club Africain)
—	DF	ALG	Sabri Cheraitia (from (Algeria) CR Belouizdad)
—	FW	ALG	Yacine Guenina (from (Algeria) MC Oran)
—	GK	ALG	Abderrahmane Medjadel (from (Algeria) Paradou AC)

Out: Note: Flags indicate national team as defined under FIFA eligibility rules; some limited exceptions apply. Players may hold more than one non-FIFA nationality.

No.	Pos.	Nation	Player
—	FW	ALG	Rédha Bensayah (to (Saudi Arabia) Al-Jabalain)
—	DF	MLI	Yacouba Doumbia (Unattached)
—	FW	ALG	Mohamed Merazi (to (Algeria) JSM Tiaret)
—	DF	ALG	Ahmed Kerroum (to (Algeria) ASO Chlef)
—	MF	ALG	Mohamed Khelfaoui (to (Algeria) MO Constantine)
—	MF	ALG	Ammar El Orfi (to (Algeria) NC Magra)
—	MF	ALG	Yacine Medane (to (Algeria) US Biskra)
—	DF	ALG	Abdelmoumen Chikhi (to (Algeria) CR Belouizdad)
—	MF	ALG	Mehdi Chenane (to (Algeria) ES Ben Aknoun)
—	GK	ALG	Azzedine Doukha (to (Algeria) CR Belouizdad)

=== JS Saoura ===
In: Note: Flags indicate national team as defined under FIFA eligibility rules; some limited exceptions apply. Players may hold more than one non-FIFA nationality.

No.	Pos.	Nation	Player
—	MF	ALG	Karm Benkouider (from (Algeria) NC Magra)
—	FW	GUI	Alkhaly Bangoura (from (Tunisia) CA Bizertin)
—	MF	ALG	Khathir Baaziz (from (Algeria) ASO Chlef)
—	FW	LBR	Van-Dave Harmon (from (Albania) KF Laçi)
—	MF	ALG	Houssem Bayoud (from (Algeria) NA Hussein Dey)
—	FW	ALG	Diaaeddine Benyahia (from (Algeria) USM Annaba)
—	DF	ALG	Zakaria Zaitri (from (Algeria) HB Chelghoum Laïd)
—	FW	ALG	Lyes Doucene (from (Algeria) MC El Eulma)
—	DF	ALG	Idir Mokeddem (from (Algeria) RC Arbaâ)

Out: Note: Flags indicate national team as defined under FIFA eligibility rules; some limited exceptions apply. Players may hold more than one non-FIFA nationality.

No.	Pos.	Nation	Player
—	MF	ALG	Abdelkrim Allaoui (to (Algeria) MC El Bayadh)
—	MF	ALG	Belaid Hamidi (to (Algeria) CR Belouizdad)
—	DF	ALG	Imadeddine Boubekeur (to (Morocco) Wydad AC)
—	MF	ALG	Mohamed Daoud (to (Algeria) NC Magra)

=== MC Alger ===
In: Note: Flags indicate national team as defined under FIFA eligibility rules; some limited exceptions apply. Players may hold more than one non-FIFA nationality.

No.	Pos.	Nation	Player
—	FW	ALG	Abdelmalek Oukil (from (Algeria) RC Arbaâ)
—	DF	ALG	Houari Ferhani (from (Algeria) ES Sétif)
—	DF	ALG	Abdelkader Menezla (from (Algeria) USM Bel Abbès)
—	FW	NGA	Victor Mbaoma (from (Nigeria) Enyimba)
—	FW	ALG	Idir Boutrif (from (Luxembourg) CS Fola Esch)
—	MF	ALG	Tayeb Hamoudi (from (Algeria) Paradou AC)
—	MF	ALG	Khalid Dahamni (from (Algeria) ASO Chlef)
—	DF	ALG	Boualem Mesmoudi (from (Qatar) Al-Wakrah SC)
—	FW	ALG	Chouaib Debbih (from (Algeria) CS Constantine)
—	DF	ALG	Ayoub Abdellaoui (from (Saudi Arabia) Ettifaq FC)
—	FW	ALG	Kheireddine Merzougui (from (Algeria) CR Belouizdad)
—	DF	ALG	Réda Halaïmia (from (Belgium) Beerschot)
—	MF	ALG	(from (Morocco) Hassania Agadir)

Out: Note: Flags indicate national team as defined under FIFA eligibility rules; some limited exceptions apply. Players may hold more than one non-FIFA nationality.

No.	Pos.	Nation	Player
—	DF	ALG	Abderahmane Hachoud (Unattached)
—	DF	ALG	Aymen Attou (Unattached)
—	DF	ALG	Mohamed Amine Ezzemani (Unattached)
—	FW	ALG	Mohamed Benbournane (Unattached)
—	DF	ALG	Mouad Hadded (to (Algeria) CR Belouizdad)
—	MF	CIV	Isla Daoudi Diomande (Unattached)
—	FW	ALG	Samy Frioui (to (Bahrain) Al-Khaldiya SC)
—	FW	ALG	Hamza Zaidi (Unattached)
—	MF	ALG	Youcef El Houari (Unattached)
—	DF	ALG	Miloud Rebiai (to (Algeria) CR Belouizdad)
—	MF	ALG	Abdelraouf Benguit (to (Morocco) Raja CA)
—	FW	ALG	Abdelhak Abdelhafid (to (Algeria) CS Constantine)

=== MC El Bayadh ===
In: Note: Flags indicate national team as defined under FIFA eligibility rules; some limited exceptions apply. Players may hold more than one non-FIFA nationality.

No.	Pos.	Nation	Player
—	FW	ALG	Abdelillah Barkat (from (Algeria) RC Relizane)
—	FW	ALG	Abou Sofiane Balegh (from (Algeria) RC Relizane)
—	DF	ALG	Walid Alati (from (Algeria) MC Oran)

Out: Note: Flags indicate national team as defined under FIFA eligibility rules; some limited exceptions apply. Players may hold more than one non-FIFA nationality.

No.	Pos.	Nation	Player

=== MC Oran ===
In: Note: Flags indicate national team as defined under FIFA eligibility rules; some limited exceptions apply. Players may hold more than one non-FIFA nationality.

No.	Pos.	Nation	Player
—	DF	ALG	[[]] (from (Algeria) [[]])
—	MF	ALG	[[]] (from (Algeria) [[]])
—	FW	ALG	[[]] (from (Algeria) [[]])
—	DF	ALG	[[]] (from (Algeria) [[]])
—	MF	ALG	[[]] (from (Algeria) [[]])
—	FW	ALG	[[]] (from (Algeria) [[]])

Out: Note: Flags indicate national team as defined under FIFA eligibility rules; some limited exceptions apply. Players may hold more than one non-FIFA nationality.

No.	Pos.	Nation	Player
—	DF	ALG	[[]] (to (Algeria) [[]])
—	MF	ALG	[[]] (to (Algeria) [[]])
—	FW	ALG	[[]] (to (Algeria) [[]])
—	DF	ALG	[[]] (to (Algeria) [[]])
—	MF	ALG	[[]] (to (Algeria) [[]])
—	FW	ALG	[[]] (to (Algeria) [[]])

=== NC Magra ===
In: Note: Flags indicate national team as defined under FIFA eligibility rules; some limited exceptions apply. Players may hold more than one non-FIFA nationality.

No.	Pos.	Nation	Player
—	DF	ALG	[[]] (from (Algeria) [[]])
—	MF	ALG	[[]] (from (Algeria) [[]])
—	FW	ALG	[[]] (from (Algeria) [[]])
—	DF	ALG	[[]] (from (Algeria) [[]])
—	MF	ALG	[[]] (from (Algeria) [[]])
—	FW	ALG	[[]] (from (Algeria) [[]])

Out: Note: Flags indicate national team as defined under FIFA eligibility rules; some limited exceptions apply. Players may hold more than one non-FIFA nationality.

No.	Pos.	Nation	Player
—	DF	ALG	[[]] (to (Algeria) [[]])
—	MF	ALG	[[]] (to (Algeria) [[]])
—	FW	ALG	[[]] (to (Algeria) [[]])
—	DF	ALG	[[]] (to (Algeria) [[]])
—	MF	ALG	[[]] (to (Algeria) [[]])
—	FW	ALG	[[]] (to (Algeria) [[]])

=== Paradou AC ===
In: Note: Flags indicate national team as defined under FIFA eligibility rules; some limited exceptions apply. Players may hold more than one non-FIFA nationality.

No.	Pos.	Nation	Player
—	DF	ALG	[[]] (from (Algeria) [[]])
—	MF	ALG	[[]] (from (Algeria) [[]])
—	FW	ALG	[[]] (from (Algeria) [[]])
—	DF	ALG	[[]] (from (Algeria) [[]])
—	MF	ALG	[[]] (from (Algeria) [[]])
—	FW	ALG	[[]] (from (Algeria) [[]])

Out: Note: Flags indicate national team as defined under FIFA eligibility rules; some limited exceptions apply. Players may hold more than one non-FIFA nationality.

No.	Pos.	Nation	Player
—	DF	ALG	[[]] (to (Algeria) [[]])
—	MF	ALG	[[]] (to (Algeria) [[]])
—	FW	ALG	[[]] (to (Algeria) [[]])
—	DF	ALG	[[]] (to (Algeria) [[]])
—	MF	ALG	[[]] (to (Algeria) [[]])
—	FW	ALG	[[]] (to (Algeria) [[]])

=== RC Arbaâ ===
In: Note: Flags indicate national team as defined under FIFA eligibility rules; some limited exceptions apply. Players may hold more than one non-FIFA nationality.

No.	Pos.	Nation	Player
—	FW	ALG	Ahmed Zaouche (from (Algeria) MC El Eulma)
—	FW	ALG	Islam Ansal (from (Algeria) CA Bordj Bou Arréridj)
—	MF	ALG	Abderrezak Kibboua (from (Algeria) Paradou AC)
—	FW	ALG	Aymen Amoura (from (Algeria) WA Tlemcen)

Out: Note: Flags indicate national team as defined under FIFA eligibility rules; some limited exceptions apply. Players may hold more than one non-FIFA nationality.

No.	Pos.	Nation	Player
—	FW	ALG	Abdelmalek Oukil (to (Algeria) MC Alger)
—	DF	ALG	Idir Mokeddem (to (Algeria) JS Saoura)
—	FW	ALG	Mohamed Amine Bouziane (to (Tunisia) US Monastir)

=== US Biskra ===
In: Note: Flags indicate national team as defined under FIFA eligibility rules; some limited exceptions apply. Players may hold more than one non-FIFA nationality.

No.	Pos.	Nation	Player
—	DF	ALG	Merouane Boussalem (from (Algeria) NA Hussein Dey)
—	FW	ALG	Lamine Abid (from (Algeria) Unattached)
—	FW	ALG	Cherif Siam (from (Algeria) MC Oran)
—	MF	ALG	Ahmed Gagaa (from (Algeria) Olympique de Médéa)
—	FW	ALG	Mourad Bouraada (from (Algeria) RC Kouba)
—	DF	ALG	Abdelhak Belkacemi (from (Algeria) HB Chelghoum Laïd)

Out: Note: Flags indicate national team as defined under FIFA eligibility rules; some limited exceptions apply. Players may hold more than one non-FIFA nationality.

No.	Pos.	Nation	Player
—	FW	ALG	Hichem Mokhtar (to (Saudi Arabia) Al-Najma SC)
—	DF	ALG	Hamza Salem (to (Algeria) ES Sétif)

=== USM Alger ===
In: Note: Flags indicate national team as defined under FIFA eligibility rules; some limited exceptions apply. Players may hold more than one non-FIFA nationality.

No.	Pos.	Nation	Player
—	FW	ALG	Abdesslem Bouchouareb (from (Algeria) NC Magra)
—	MF	ALG	Abderrahmane Bacha (from (Algeria) JS Bordj Ménaïel)
—	DF	ALG	Mehdi Beneddine (Loan return from (France) Châteauroux)
—	DF	ALG	Anis Khemaissia (Loan return from (Algeria) USM Annaba)
—	GK	ALG	Abdelmoumen Sifour (Loan return from (Algeria) RC Arbaâ)
—	GK	ALG	Imad Benchlef (from (Algeria) NA Hussein Dey)
—	FW	ALG	Khaled Bousseliou (from (Algeria) CR Belouizdad)
—	FW	ALG	Khalil Darfalou (from (Algeria) ES Sétif)
—	MF	ALG	Zakaria Alharaish (from (Montenegro) Sutjeska Nikšić)
—	MF	ALG	Akram Djahnit (from (Algeria) ES Sétif)

Out: Note: Flags indicate national team as defined under FIFA eligibility rules; some limited exceptions apply. Players may hold more than one non-FIFA nationality.

No.	Pos.	Nation	Player
—	GK	ALG	Alexis Guendouz (to (Algeria) CR Belouizdad)
—	DF	ALG	Fateh Achour (to (Algeria) ASO Chlef)
—	DF	ALG	Abderrahim Hamra (Unattached)
—	MF	ALG	Ibrahim Chenihi (Unattached)
—	MF	ALG	Hamza Koudri (Unattached)
—	MF	ALG	Kamel Belarbi (to (Algeria) ASO Chlef)
—	FW	GHA	Kwame Opoku (Loan to (Saudi Arabia) Najran SC)
—	DF	ALG	Anis Khemaissia (to (Algeria) HB Chelghoum Laïd)

=== USM Khenchela ===
In: Note: Flags indicate national team as defined under FIFA eligibility rules; some limited exceptions apply. Players may hold more than one non-FIFA nationality.

No.	Pos.	Nation	Player
—	DF	ALG	Aymen Attou (from (Algeria) MC Alger)
—	FW	ALG	Hamza Zaidi (from (Algeria) MC Alger)
—	MF	ALG	Abdessamad Bounoua (from (Algeria) MC Oran)
—	FW	NGA	Tosin Omoyele (from (Nigeria) Enyimba)
—	MF	GHA	Maxwell Baakoh (from (Ghana) Asante Kotoko)

Out: Note: Flags indicate national team as defined under FIFA eligibility rules; some limited exceptions apply. Players may hold more than one non-FIFA nationality.

No.	Pos.	Nation	Player
