= 2019 Algerian Super Cup =

2020 Algerian Super Cup
- Stade du 5 Juillet hosted the match
USM Alger	CR Belouizdad
Ligue 1	Algerian Cup
1	2
- Date: 21 November 2020
- Venue: Stade du 5 Juillet, Algiers
- Referee: Youcef Gamouh
- Attendance: 0 (close doors)
- Weather: Cloudy; 15 °C (59 °F); 62% humidity

The 2019 Algerian Super Cup was the 13th edition of the Algerian Super Cup, a football match contested by the winners of the 2018–19 Algerian Ligue Professionnelle 1 and 2018–19 Algerian Cup competitions. It was known as the Mobilis Supercoupe d'Algérie 2019 due to the start of a sponsorship deal with Mobilis ATM. The match was played on November 21, 2020, at Stade du 5 Juillet in Algiers, between 2018–19 Ligue 1 winners USM Alger and 2018–19 Algerian Cup winners CR Belouizdad.

== Match ==
=== Pre-match ===
The match between the two teams are the first of its kind in the Super Cup USM Alger looking for the third in the fifth final and the CR Belouizdad for the third final looking for the first title, as a whole season play on November 1, But because it coincides with Friday, it was delayed 24 hours FAF was chosen Stadium of Algiers Stade du 5 Juillet, This is the sixth time the final has been played on this Stadium and the first since 2007. On October 21, LFP decided to postpone the final to another date because of a match on the same stadium on 3 November between Paradou AC and KCCA in the CAF Confederation Cup. After the recent push and pull, the head of the Ligue de Football Professionnel, Abdelkrim Medouar, announced the date of May 1, 2020 as the date for the final on a Ramadan evening. due to the COVID-19 pandemic in Algeria, the final has become threatened with cancellation On October 4, The Federal Bureau decided that the final play before the start of the 2020–21 season on November 21, 2020. Each team was allowed to make five substitutes with no extra time, Also for the first time in Algeria there will be a woman as a referee she is Lamia Athmane as fourth official referee.

=== Summary ===
In the first match in Algeria after nine months due to COVID-19 pandemic in Algeria, the level was fine and the start was strong on the part of CR Belouizdad, to get a penalty kick in the 8th minute After obstruction of Mustapha Bouchina, Amir Sayoud scored the first goal, then CR Belouizdad continued to dominate in the first half and in the 33rd minute after a mistake Marcellin Koukpo scored the second goal for Al Shabab. At the beginning of the second half Abderrahim Hamra entered where USM Alger's performance improved Aymen Mahious scored the first goal for USM Alger in the 60th minute, and end with winning the title for the second time in its history. to also receive a prize of 150 million dinars about 100 thousand euros. After losing the final USM Alger decided to dismiss François Ciccolini from his post because he did not rise to the podium to receive the medal, which was considered an insult to an official body Where was the Prime Minister Abdelaziz Djerad present.

== Match details ==
21 November 2020
20:30

USM Alger	1–2	CR Belouizdad
Mahious 60'	Report	Sayoud 10' (pen.); Koukpo 33'

Stade du 5 Juillet, Algiers
Attendance: 0 (close doors)
Referee: Youcef Gamouh

USM Alger	CR Belouizdad

GK	16	(Algeria) Alexis Guendouz
CB	21	(Algeria) Adam Alilet		(substituted off) 46'
CB	5	(Algeria) Mustapha Bouchina
LB	20	(France) Mehdi Beneddine
RB	24	(Algeria) Anis Khemaissia
DM	6	(Algeria) Oussama Chita		(substituted off) 62'
DM	23	(Algeria) Hamza Koudri (c)
FW	7	(Algeria) Ismail Belkacemi
AM	26	(Algeria) Billel Benhammouda		(substituted off) 82'
RW	11	(Algeria) Abdelkrim Zouari
ST	18	(Algeria) Aymen Mahious
Substitutes :
GK	27	(Algeria) Abdelmoumen Sifour
CB	3	(Algeria) Abderrahim Hamra		(substituted on) 46'
RB	22	(Algeria) Fateh Achour
DM	17	(Algeria) Taher Benkhelifa	(yellow card) 90+1'	(substituted on) 62'
DM	10	(Algeria) Mohamed Reda Boumechra
FW	15	(France) Mazire Soula
CF	25	(Algeria) Oussama Abdeldjelil		(substituted on) 82'
Manager :
(France) François Ciccolini

GK	16	(Algeria) Toufik Moussaoui
DF	18	(Algeria) Sofiane Bouchar
DF	2	(Algeria) Chouaib Keddad
DF	23	(Algeria) Zinelaabidine Boulakhoua
DF	3	(Algeria) Chemseddine Nessakh (c)	(yellow card) 45'
MF	21	(Algeria) Samir Aiboud
MF	24	(Algeria) Bilal Tarikat		(substituted off) 57'
MF	6	(Algeria) Zakaria Draoui
FW	25	(Benin) Marcellin Koukpo		(substituted off) 76'
MF	10	(Algeria) Amir Sayoud	(yellow card) 90+2'
MF	7	(Algeria) Youcef Bechou		(substituted off) 58'
Substitutes :
GK	1	(Algeria) Gaya Merbah
DF	22	(Algeria) Mokhtar Belkhiter
DF	4	(Algeria) Zakaria Khali
FW	33	(Algeria) Houssem Eddine Mrezigue
FW	9	(Algeria) Mohamed Souibaâh		(substituted on) 58'
FW	17	(Algeria) Khaled Bousseliou		(substituted on) 76'
MF	5	(Algeria) Larbi Tabti		(substituted on) 57'
Manager :
(France) Franck Dumas

Assistant referees:
Bouabdallah Omari
Akram Abbas Zerhouni
Fourth official:
Lamia Athmane

Match rules

- 90 minutes.
- Penalty shoot-out if scores level.
- Seven named substitutes, of which up to five may be used.

== See also ==
- 2018–19 Algerian Ligue Professionnelle 1
- 2018–19 Algerian Cup
