= List of Algerian football transfers winter 2020–21 =

This is a list of Algerian football transfers in the 2020–21 winter transfer window by club. clubs in the 2020–21 Algerian Ligue Professionnelle 1 are included.

== Ligue Professionnelle 1 ==
=== AS Ain M'lila ===
In: Note: Flags indicate national team as defined under FIFA eligibility rules; some limited exceptions apply. Players may hold more than one non-FIFA nationality.

No.	Pos.	Nation	Player
—	DF	(Algeria) ALG	[[]] (from (Algeria) [[]])
—	MF	(Algeria) ALG	[[]] (from (Algeria) [[]])
—	FW	(Algeria) ALG	[[]] (from (Algeria) [[]])

Out: Note: Flags indicate national team as defined under FIFA eligibility rules; some limited exceptions apply. Players may hold more than one non-FIFA nationality.

No.	Pos.	Nation	Player
—	DF	(Algeria) ALG	[[]] (to (Algeria) [[]])
—	MF	(Algeria) ALG	[[]] (to (Algeria) [[]])
—	FW	(Algeria) ALG	[[]] (to (Algeria) [[]])

=== ASO Chlef ===
In: Note: Flags indicate national team as defined under FIFA eligibility rules; some limited exceptions apply. Players may hold more than one non-FIFA nationality.

No.	Pos.	Nation	Player

Out: Note: Flags indicate national team as defined under FIFA eligibility rules; some limited exceptions apply. Players may hold more than one non-FIFA nationality.

No.	Pos.	Nation	Player
—	FW	(Algeria) ALG	Féthi Tahar (to (Algeria) MC Alger)

=== CR Belouizdad ===
In: Note: Flags indicate national team as defined under FIFA eligibility rules; some limited exceptions apply. Players may hold more than one non-FIFA nationality.

No.	Pos.	Nation	Player
—	DF	(Algeria) ALG	Kheireddine Merzougui (from (Algeria) JSM Skikda)
—	FW	(Algeria) ALG	Hicham Khalfallah (from (Algeria) Olympique de Médéa)

Out: Note: Flags indicate national team as defined under FIFA eligibility rules; some limited exceptions apply. Players may hold more than one non-FIFA nationality.

No.	Pos.	Nation	Player
—	FW	(Algeria) ALG	Fouad Ghanem (to (Algeria) JS Kabylie)
—	FW	(Belgium) BEL	Maecky Ngombo (Unattached)

=== ES Sétif ===
In: Note: Flags indicate national team as defined under FIFA eligibility rules; some limited exceptions apply. Players may hold more than one non-FIFA nationality.

No.	Pos.	Nation	Player
—	DF	(Algeria) ALG	Mohamed Khoutir Ziti (from (Libya) Nasr Benghazi)
—	MF	(Algeria) ALG	Abdelmoumene Djabou (from (Algeria) MC Alger)
—	DF	(Algeria) ALG	Nasreddine Benlebna (from (Algeria) USM Bel Abbès)
—	FW	(Ghana) GHA	Daniel Lomotey (from (Ghana) WAFA)

Out: Note: Flags indicate national team as defined under FIFA eligibility rules; some limited exceptions apply. Players may hold more than one non-FIFA nationality.

No.	Pos.	Nation	Player

=== JS Kabylie ===
In: Note: Flags indicate national team as defined under FIFA eligibility rules; some limited exceptions apply. Players may hold more than one non-FIFA nationality.

No.	Pos.	Nation	Player
—	FW	(Democratic Republic of the Congo) COD	Glody Kilangalanga (from (Tunisia) CS Chebba)
—	MF	(Algeria) ALG	Yacine Medane (from (Algeria) Olympique de Médéa)
—	FW	(Algeria) ALG	Ali Haroun (from (Algeria) USM Bel Abbès)
—	FW	(Algeria) ALG	Fouad Ghanem (from (Algeria) CR Belouizdad)

Out: Note: Flags indicate national team as defined under FIFA eligibility rules; some limited exceptions apply. Players may hold more than one non-FIFA nationality.

No.	Pos.	Nation	Player

=== MC Alger ===
In: Note: Flags indicate national team as defined under FIFA eligibility rules; some limited exceptions apply. Players may hold more than one non-FIFA nationality.

No.	Pos.	Nation	Player
—	FW	(Ghana) GHA	Joseph Esso (from (Ghana) Dreams FC)
—	FW	(Algeria) ALG	Féthi Tahar (from (Algeria) ASO Chlef)

Out: Note: Flags indicate national team as defined under FIFA eligibility rules; some limited exceptions apply. Players may hold more than one non-FIFA nationality.

No.	Pos.	Nation	Player
—	MF	(Algeria) ALG	Abdelmoumene Djabou (to (Algeria) ES Sétif)
—	MF	(Algeria) ALG	Abdellah El Moudene (to (Morocco) Mouloudia Oujda)

=== Paradou AC ===
In: Note: Flags indicate national team as defined under FIFA eligibility rules; some limited exceptions apply. Players may hold more than one non-FIFA nationality.

No.	Pos.	Nation	Player

Out: Note: Flags indicate national team as defined under FIFA eligibility rules; some limited exceptions apply. Players may hold more than one non-FIFA nationality.

No.	Pos.	Nation	Player
—	FW	(Algeria) ALG	Zakaria Naidji (Loan from (Algeria) USM Alger)
—	DF	(Algeria) ALG	Haithem Loucif (from (Algeria) USM Alger)

=== USM Alger ===
In: Note: Flags indicate national team as defined under FIFA eligibility rules; some limited exceptions apply. Players may hold more than one non-FIFA nationality.

No.	Pos.	Nation	Player
—	FW	(Ghana) GHA	Kwame Opoku (from (Ghana) Asante Kotoko)
—	FW	(Burkina Faso) BFA	Hamed Belem (from (Burkina Faso) Rahimo FC)
—	FW	(Algeria) ALG	Zakaria Naidji (Loan from (Algeria) Paradou AC)
—	DF	(Algeria) ALG	Haithem Loucif (from (Algeria) Paradou AC)
—	DF	(Algeria) ALG	Houari Baouche (from (Algeria) USM Bel Abbès)

Out: Note: Flags indicate national team as defined under FIFA eligibility rules; some limited exceptions apply. Players may hold more than one non-FIFA nationality.

No.	Pos.	Nation	Player

=== USM Bel Abbès ===
In: Note: Flags indicate national team as defined under FIFA eligibility rules; some limited exceptions apply. Players may hold more than one non-FIFA nationality.

No.	Pos.	Nation	Player

Out: Note: Flags indicate national team as defined under FIFA eligibility rules; some limited exceptions apply. Players may hold more than one non-FIFA nationality.

No.	Pos.	Nation	Player
—	DF	(Algeria) ALG	Nasreddine Benlebna (to (Algeria) ES Sétif)
—	DF	(Algeria) ALG	Houari Baouche (to (Algeria) USM Alger)
—	FW	(Algeria) ALG	Ali Haroun (from (Algeria) JS Kabylie)

=== Olympique de Médéa ===
In: Note: Flags indicate national team as defined under FIFA eligibility rules; some limited exceptions apply. Players may hold more than one non-FIFA nationality.

No.	Pos.	Nation	Player

Out: Note: Flags indicate national team as defined under FIFA eligibility rules; some limited exceptions apply. Players may hold more than one non-FIFA nationality.

No.	Pos.	Nation	Player
—	FW	(Algeria) ALG	Hicham Khalfallah (to (Algeria) CR Belouizdad)
—	MF	(Algeria) ALG	Yacine Medane (from (Algeria) JS Kabylie)

=== JSM Skikda ===
In: Note: Flags indicate national team as defined under FIFA eligibility rules; some limited exceptions apply. Players may hold more than one non-FIFA nationality.

No.	Pos.	Nation	Player

Out: Note: Flags indicate national team as defined under FIFA eligibility rules; some limited exceptions apply. Players may hold more than one non-FIFA nationality.

No.	Pos.	Nation	Player
—	DF	(Algeria) ALG	Kheireddine Merzougui (to (Algeria) CR Belouizdad)
