= 2020–21 CS Constantine season =

CS Constantine
2020–21 season
- Owner: ENTP
- President: Rachid Redjradj
- Head coach: Abdelkader Amrani (from 24 June 2020) (until 21 January 2021); Miloud Hamdi (from 4 February 2021) (until 11 August 2021)
- Stadium: Stade Ramdane Benabdelmalek
- Ligue 1: Pre-season
- League Cup: Preliminary round
- Highest home attendance: 0 (Note: no one can attend games due to the COVID-19 pandemic)
- Lowest home attendance: 0 (Note: no one can attend games due to the COVID-19 pandemic)
- Average home league attendance: 0 (Note: no one can attend games due to the COVID-19 pandemic)
Home colours	Away colours	Third colours

In the 2020–21 season, CS Constantine competed in the Ligue 1 for the 25th season, and the League Cup. It was their 10th consecutive season in the top flight of Algerian football.

== Squad list ==
Players and squad numbers last updated on 15 November 2020.
Note: Flags indicate national team as has been defined under FIFA eligibility rules. Players may hold more than one non-FIFA nationality.

No.	Nat.	Position	Name	Date of birth (age)	Signed from
Goalkeepers
1	(Algeria)	GK	Hatem Bencheikh El Fegoun	3 November 1999 (aged 21)	(Algeria) Youth system
16	(Algeria)	GK	Mohamed Lotfi Anis Osmani	27 June 1996 (aged 24)	(Algeria) ES Sétif
27	(Algeria)	GK	Chamseddine Rahmani	15 September 1990 (aged 30)	(Saudi Arabia) Damac
Defenders
3	(Algeria)	LB	Yacine Salhi	19 December 1993 (aged 27)	(Algeria) MO Béjaïa
4	(Algeria)	CB	Idir Mokeddem	5 June 1994 (aged 26)	(Algeria) WA Boufarik
5	(Algeria)	CB	Zidane Mebarakou	3 January 1989 (aged 31)	(Algeria) MC Alger
12	(Algeria)	RB	Mohamed Guemroud	28 August 1994 (aged 26)	(Algeria) AS Ain M'lila
17	(Algeria)	RB	Zineddine Benyahia	20 February 1990 (aged 30)	(Algeria) AS Ain M'lila
19	(Algeria)	CB	Chamseddine Derradji	15 April 1992 (aged 28)	(Algeria) NC Magra
20	(Algeria)	LB	Brahim Boudebouda	28 August 1990 (aged 30)	(Algeria) MC Oran
24	(Algeria)	CB	Nasreddine Zaâlani	26 July 1992 (aged 28)	(Algeria) RC Arbaâ
26	(Algeria)	LB	Ahmed Maâmeri	25 June 1997 (aged 23)	(Algeria) WA Boufarik
Midfielders
6	(Algeria)	DM	Foued Hadded	1 November 1990 (aged 30)	(Algeria) DRB Tadjenanet
11	(Algeria)	LW	Aymane Issad Lakdja	16 October 1998 (aged 22)	(Algeria) NC Magra
13	(Algeria)	AM	Sid Ali Lamri	3 February 1991 (aged 29)	(Algeria) ES Sétif
14	(Algeria)	DM	Kamel Belmessaoud	28 November 1990 (aged 30)	(Algeria) JSM Béjaïa
18	(Sudan)	AM	Sharaf Eldin Shiboub	7 June 1994 (aged 26)	(Tanzania) Simba Sports Club
23	(Algeria)	DM	Nassim Yettou	23 October 1992 (aged 28)	(Algeria) MC Oran
Forwards
7	(Algeria)	ST	Abdelhakim Amokrane	10 May 1994 (aged 26)	(Algeria) MO Béjaïa
8	(Algeria)		Faik Amrane	26 November 1997 (aged 23)	(Algeria) CA Batna
9	(Algeria)	ST	Lamine Abid	4 July 1991 (aged 29)	(Algeria) NA Hussein Dey
10	(Algeria)	LW	Adem Redjehimi	20 February 1996 (aged 24)	(Algeria) USM Alger
15	(Algeria)	ST	Youcef Djahnit	11 January 1997 (aged 23)	(Algeria) CA Bordj Bou Arreridj
21	(Algeria)		Mohamed Bentahar	17 February 1994 (aged 26)	(Switzerland) La Chaux-de-Fonds
22	(Algeria)	RW	Ilyes Yaiche	27 October 1997 (aged 23)	(Algeria) USM Alger
25	(Algeria)	LW	Brahim Dib	6 July 1993 (aged 27)	(Algeria) AS Ain M'lila

== Competitions ==
=== Overview ===
Competition	Record								Started round	Final position / round	First match	Last match
Competition	G	W	D	L	GF	GA	GD	Win %	Started round	Final position / round	First match	Last match
Ligue 1	0	0	0	0	0	0	+0	—	—N/a	To be confirmed	In Progress	In Progress
League Cup	1	0	0	1	0	3	−3	0.00	Preliminary round		20 April 2021	
Total	0	0	0	0	0	0	+0	—				

Updated to match played 7 March 2020
Source: Competitions

== League table ==
Pos	Team	Pld	W	D	L	GF	GA	GD	Pts
6	MC Oran	38	15	15	8	51	37	+14	60
7	MC Alger	38	15	12	11	59	43	+16	57
8	CS Constantine	38	15	12	11	43	31	+12	57
9	NC Magra	38	14	10	14	38	44	−6	52
10	Olympique de Médéa	38	13	12	13	40	43	−3	51

Updated to match(es) played on 28 August 2021. Source: dzfoot.com
Rules for classification: 1) points; 2) head-to-head points; 3) head-to-head goal difference; 4) goal difference; 5) total goals; 6) fairplay ranking; 7) playoff.

=== Results summary ===
Overall								Home						Away					
Pld	W	D	L	GF	GA	GD	Pts	W	D	L	GF	GA	GD	W	D	L	GF	GA	GD
0	0	0	0	0	0	0	0	0	0	0	0	0	0	0	0	0	0	0	0

Last updated: 7 March 2020.
Source: Competitive matches

=== Results by round ===
Round	1	2	3	4	5	6	7	8	9	10	11	12	13	14	15	16	17	18	19	20	21	22	23	24	25	26	27	28	29	30	31	32	33	34	35	36	37	38
Ground																																						
Result	D	D	D	L	W	D	L	D	L	L	W	W	W	L	D	W	W	W	W	D	L	D	W	D	D	W	W	L	W	L	D	L	D	W	L	L	W	W
Position	13	9	10	14	11	12	14	13	13	17	13	12	11	11	12	11	11	10	10	9	10	11	9	9	9	8	8	8	8	8	9	9	8	8	8	8	8	8

Updated to match(es) played on 24 August 2021. Source: Competitive matches
A = Away; H = Home; W = Win; D = Draw; L = Loss

=== Matches ===
On 22 October 2020, the Algerian Ligue Professionnelle 1 fixtures were announced.

27 November 2020 Round 1	CS Constantine	0–0	WA Tlemcen	Constantine
14:30		Soccerway report		Stadium: Stade Ramdane Benabdelmalek; Attendance: 0 (close doors); Referee: Lotfi Bekouassa

4 December 2020 Round 2	Paradou AC	2–2	CS Constantine	Dar El Beïda
15:00	Benbouali 30'; Guenaoui 39'	Soccerway report	Bentahar 41', 90+2'	Stadium: Omar Benrabah Stadium; Attendance: 0 (close doors); Referee: Said Aouina

12 December 2020 Round 3	CS Constantine	0–0	ASO Chlef	Constantine
14:30		Soccerway report		Stadium: Stade Ramdane Benabdelmalek; Attendance: 0 (close doors); Referee: Lyés Bekouassa

23 December 2020 Round 5	CS Constantine	2–1	USM Alger	Constantine
14:30	Beneddine 27' (o.g.); Shibun 90' (pen.)	Soccerway report	Bouchina 56'	Stadium: Stade Ramdane Benabdelmalek; Attendance: 0 (close doors); Referee: Malek Ait Ameur

1 January 2021 Round 4	MC Alger	1–0	CS Constantine	Algiers
15:00	Brahimi 59'	Soccerway report		Stadium: Stade du 5 Juillet; Attendance: 0 (close doors); Referee: Mohamed Boutaraa

8 January 2021 Round 7	CS Constantine	0–1	AS Aïn M'lila	El Khroub
14:30		Soccerway report	Hamia 90+3'	Stadium: Stade Abed Hamdani; Attendance: 0 (close doors); Referee: Mustapha Bessiri

14 January 2021 Round 8	JSM Skikda	0–0	CS Constantine	Skikda
14:00		Soccerway report		Stadium: Stade 20 Août 1955; Attendance: 0 (close doors); Referee: Yazid Ibrir

22 January 2021 Round 9	CS Constantine	0–1	ES Sétif	El Khroub
14:30		Soccerway report	Kendouci 17'	Stadium: Stade Abed Hamdani; Attendance: 0 (close doors); Referee: Nabil Boukhalfa

26 January 2021 Round 10	JS Saoura	1–0	CS Constantine	Béchar
15:00	Saâd 86'	Soccerway report		Stadium: Stade 20 Août 1955; Attendance: 0 (close doors); Referee: Farouk Mial

30 January 2021 Round 11	CS Constantine	2–0	NC Magra	El Khroub
14:30	Amokrane 11'; Yettou 87'	Soccerway report		Stadium: Stade Abed Hamdani; Attendance: 0 (close doors); Referee: Mustapha Ghorbal

6 February 2021 Round 12	US Biskra	0–1	CS Constantine	Biskra
15:00		Soccerway report	Belmessaoud 63'	Stadium: Stade du 18 Février; Attendance: 0 (close doors); Referee: Amine Sekhraoui

19 February 2021 Round 14	CS Constantine	1–3	MC Oran	El Khroub
14:30	Amokrane 72'	Soccerway report	Motrani 4'; Mesmoudi 32'; Belloumi 77'	Stadium: Stade Abed Hamdani; Attendance: 0 (close doors); Referee: Ahmed Bouzrar

26 February 2021 Round 15	Olympique de Médéa	0–0	CS Constantine	Médéa
15:00		Soccerway report		Stadium: Stade Imam Lyes; Attendance: 0 (close doors); Referee: Farouk Mial

5 March 2021 Round 16	CS Constantine	2–1	NA Hussein Dey	El Khroub
15:00	Yettou 33'; Amokrane 67'	Soccerway report	Meftah 54'	Stadium: Stade Abed Hamdani; Attendance: 0 (close doors); Referee: Nabil Boukhalfa

8 March 2021 Round 6	CR Belouizdad	1–1	CS Constantine	Belouizdad
15:00	Belahouel 50'	Soccerway report	Amokrane 58'	Stadium: Stade 20 Août 1955; Attendance: 0 (close doors); Referee: Amine Hansal

12 March 2021 Round 17	CS Constantine	5–2	RC Relizane	El Khroub
15:00	Lakdja 31', 53'; Lamri 45+1'; Amokrane 65', 83'	Soccerway report	Balegh 3'; Seguer 88'	Stadium: Stade Abed Hamdani; Attendance: 0 (close doors); Referee: Lahlou Benbraham

17 March 2021 Round 18	CA Bordj Bou Arreridj	0–3	CS Constantine	Bordj Bou Arréridj
15:00		Soccerway report	Amrane 5'; Belmessaoud 36'; Lamri 71'	Stadium: Stade 20 Août 1955; Attendance: 0 (close doors); Referee: Lyés Bekouassa

21 March 2021 Round 19	CS Constantine	1–0	USM Bel Abbès	Constantine
15:00	Bentahar 81'	Soccerway report		Stadium: Stade Ramdane Benabdelmalek; Attendance: 0 (close doors); Referee: Malek Ait Ameur

26 March 2021 Round 13	JS Kabylie	0–1	CS Constantine	Tizi Ouzou
15:00		Soccerway report	Temine 65'	Stadium: Stade 1er Novembre 1954; Attendance: 0 (close doors); Referee: Mustapha Ghorbal

4 May 2021 Round 20	WA Tlemcen	0–0	CS Constantine	Tlemcen
22:30		Soccerway report		Stadium: Stade Akid Lotfi; Attendance: 0 (close doors); Referee: Lyés Bekouassa

16 May 2021 Round 21	CS Constantine	0–1	Paradou AC	Constantine
17:00		Soccerway report	Benbouali 35'	Stadium: Stade Ramdane Benabdelmalek; Attendance: 0 (close doors); Referee: Mohamed Saïdi

22 May 2021 Round 22	ASO Chlef	1–1	CS Constantine	Chlef
18:00	Bouguettaya 54'	Soccerway report	Amokrane 73'	Stadium: Stade Mohamed Boumezrag; Attendance: 0 (close doors); Referee: Zouaoui

26 May 2021 Round 23	CS Constantine	1–0	MC Alger	Constantine
17:00	Dib 38'	Soccerway report		Stadium: Stade Ramdane Benabdelmalek; Attendance: 0 (close doors); Referee: Abdelali Ibrir

30 May 2021 Round 24	USM Alger	0–0	CS Constantine	Bologhine
17:00		Soccerway report		Stadium: Omar Hamadi Stadium; Attendance: 0 (close doors); Referee: Mohamed Boutaraa

18 June 2021 Round 26	AS Ain M'lila	2–3	CS Constantine	Aïn M'lila
17:00	Tiaïba 17', 77'	Soccerway report	Amokrane 52'; Djahnit 90'; Yaiche 90+4'	Stadium: Touhami Zoubir Khelifi Stadium; Attendance: 0 (close doors); Referee: Bilal Bendjahene

23 June 2021 Round 25	CS Constantine	0–0	CR Belouizdad	Constantine
17:00		Soccerway report		Stadium: Stade Ramdane Benabdelmalek; Attendance: 0 (close doors); Referee: Abderrezzak Arab

27 June 2021 Round 27	CS Constantine	4–0	JSM Skikda	Constantine
17:00	Bentahar 2'; Dib 32'; Haddad 48'; Haddouche 69'	Soccerway report		Stadium: Stade Ramdane Benabdelmalek; Attendance: 0 (close doors); Referee: Amar Khoudja

1 July 2021 Round 28	ES Sétif	1–0	CS Constantine	Sétif
17:45	Kendouci 58'	Soccerway report		Stadium: Stade 8 Mai 1945; Attendance: 0 (close doors); Referee: Said Aouina

4 July 2021 Round 29	CS Constantine	1–0	JS Saoura	Constantine
17:00	Haddad 85'	Soccerway report		Stadium: Stade Ramdane Benabdelmalek; Attendance: 0 (close doors); Referee: Lotfi Bekouassa

8 July 2021 Round 30	NC Magra	1–0	CS Constantine	Magra
17:45	Ziouache 38'	Soccerway report		Stadium: Boucheligue Brothers Stadium; Attendance: 0 (close doors); Referee: Hamza Bouslimani

13 July 2021 Round 31	CS Constantine	1–1	US Biskra	Constantine
18:00	Amrane 41'	Soccerway report	Harrari 90+5'	Stadium: Stade Ramdane Benabdelmalek; Attendance: 0 (close doors); Referee: Malek Ait Ameur

18 July 2021 Round 32	CS Constantine	1–2	JS Kabylie	Constantine
17:45	Souyad 34' (o.g.)	Soccerway report	Bencherifa 43'; Zaka 68'	Stadium: Stade Ramdane Benabdelmalek; Attendance: 0 (close doors); Referee: Ali Nader

23 July 2021 Round 33	MC Oran	0–0	CS Constantine	Oran
21:00		Soccerway report		Stadium: Ahmed Zabana Stadium; Attendance: 0 (close doors); Referee: Ahmed Bouzrar

27 July 2021 Round 34	CS Constantine	2–0	Olympique de Médéa	Constantine
17:45	Mebarakou 48'; Lakdja 79'	Soccerway report		Stadium: Stade Ramdane Benabdelmalek; Attendance: 0 (close doors); Referee: Abdelmoumen Touabti

9 August 2021 Round 35	NA Hussein Dey	2–1	CS Constantine	Belouizdad
17:30	Nadji 47'; Benayad 49'	Soccerway report	Dib 54'	Stadium: Stade 20 Août 1955; Attendance: 0 (close doors); Referee: Said Aouina

16 August 2021 Round 36	RC Relizane	2–1	CS Constantine	Relizane
17:30	Seguer 13'; Elmenaouer 36'	Soccerway report	Bouldjedri 29'	Stadium: Stade Tahar Zoughari; Attendance: 0 (close doors); Referee: Amine Hansal

21 August 2021 Round 37	CS Constantine	5–4	CA Bordj Bou Arreridj	Constantine
17:30	Bendaoud 21'; Dib 44'; Lakdja 46'; Bouldjedri 70', 89'	Soccerway report	Amriche 17'; Belferkous 62' (pen.); Guessas 66'; Lalaoui 90+3'	Stadium: Stade Ramdane Benabdelmalek; Attendance: 0 (close doors); Referee: Bouchaker

2021 Round 38	–
16:00	[ Soccerway report]

== Algerian League Cup ==
20 April 2021 Preliminary round	NC Magra	3–0	CS Constantine	Magra
15:30	Haïmoud 31'; Demane 67'; Bouguèche 72'	Report		Stadium: Boucheligue Brothers Stadium; Attendance: 0 (close doors); Referee: Lotfi Bekouassa
Note: Lineup for CS Constantine - Rahmani, Guemroud, Derradji (Amokrane, 64'), Mebarakou, Haddouche (Lakdja, 46'), Temine, Yettou, Lamri, Yaiche, Shibun (Haddad, 63'), Amrane (Salhi, 46').

== Squad information ==
=== Playing statistics ===
No.	Pos	Nat	Player	Total		Ligue 1		League Cup	
No.	Pos	Nat	Player	Apps	Goals	Apps	Goals	Apps	Goals
Goalkeepers
1	GK	(Algeria) ALG	Hatem Bencheikh El Fegoun	0	0	0	0	0	0
16	GK	(Algeria) ALG	Mohamed Lotfi Anis Osmani	0	0	0	0	0	0
27	GK	(Algeria) ALG	Chamseddine Rahmani	1	0	0	0	1	0
Defenders
3	DF	(Algeria) ALG	Yacine Salhi	1	0	0	0	1	0
4	DF	(Algeria) ALG	Idir Mokeddem	0	0	0	0	0	0
5	DF	(Algeria) ALG	Zidane Mebarakou	1	0	0	0	1	0
12	DF	(Algeria) ALG	Mohamed Guemroud	1	0	0	0	1	0
17	DF	(Algeria) ALG	Zineddine Benyahia	0	0	0	0	0	0
19	DF	(Algeria) ALG	Chamseddine Derradji	1	0	0	0	1	0
20	DF	(Algeria) ALG	Brahim Boudebouda	0	0	0	0	0	0
24	DF	(Algeria) ALG	Nasreddine Zaâlani	0	0	0	0	0	0
26	DF	(Algeria) ALG	Ahmed Maâmeri	0	0	0	0	0	0
Midfielders
6	MF	(Algeria) ALG	Foued Hadded	1	0	0	0	1	0
11	MF	(Algeria) ALG	Aymane Issad Lakdja	1	0	0	0	1	0
13	MF	(Algeria) ALG	Sid Ali Lamri	1	0	0	0	1	0
14	MF	(Algeria) ALG	Kamel Belmessaoud	0	0	0	0	0	0
18	MF	(Sudan) SDN	Sharaf Shibun	1	0	0	0	1	0
23	MF	(Algeria) ALG	Nassim Yettou	1	0	0	0	1	0
Forwards
7	FW	(Algeria) ALG	Abdelhakim Amokrane	1	0	0	0	1	0
8	FW	(Algeria) ALG	Faik Amrane	1	0	0	0	1	0
	FW	(Algeria) ALG	Mounder Temine	1	0	0	0	1	0
9	FW	(Algeria) ALG	Lamine Abid	0	0	0	0	0	0
10	FW	(Algeria) ALG	Adem Redjehimi	0	0	0	0	0	0
15	FW	(Algeria) ALG	Youcef Djahnit	0	0	0	0	0	0
21	FW	(Algeria) ALG	Mohamed Bentahar	0	0	0	0	0	0
22	FW	(Algeria) ALG	Ilyes Yaiche	1	0	0	0	1	0
25	FW	(Algeria) ALG	Brahim Dib	0	0	0	0	0	0
2	FW	(Algeria) ALG	Zakaria Haddouche	1	0	0	0	1	0
Players transferred out during the season

Last updated: 11 June 2018
Source: fr.soccerway.com

=== Goalscorers ===
Includes all competitive matches. The list is sorted alphabetically by surname when total goals are equal.

== Transfers ==
=== In ===
Date	Pos	Player	From club	Transfer fee	Source
11 August 2020	DF	(Algeria) Ahmed Maâmeri	WA Boufarik	Free transfer	
11 August 2020	MF	(Algeria) Amine Baghdaoui	ASM Oran	Free transfer	
14 August 2020	FW	(Algeria) Fayek Amrane	CA Batna	Free transfer	
21 August 2020	DF	(Algeria) Idir Mokeddem	WA Boufarik	Free transfer	
26 August 2020	FW	(Algeria) Brahim Dib	AS Ain M'lila	Free transfer	
4 September 2020	FW	(Algeria) Issad Lakdja	NC Magra	Free transfer	
18 September 2020	MF	(Algeria) Ilyes Yaiche	USM Alger	Free transfer	
28 September 2020	DF	(Algeria) Mohamed Guemroud	AS Ain M'lila	Free transfer	
7 October 2020	DF	(Algeria) Zidane Mebarakou	MC Alger	Free transfer	
15 October 2020	LW	(Algeria) Adem Redjehimi	USM Alger	Free transfer	
27 October 2020	FW	(Algeria) Youcef Djahnit	CA Bordj Bou Arreridj	Free transfer	
24 October 2020	FW	(Sudan) Sharaf Shibun	(Tanzania) Simba Sports Club	Free transfer	
24 October 2020	FW	(Algeria) Mohamed Bentahar	(Switzerland) La Chaux-de-Fonds	Free transfer	
30 January 2021	MF	(Algeria) Zakaria Haddouche	(Saudi Arabia) Al-Khaleej	Free transfer	

=== Out ===
Date	Pos	Player	To club	Transfer fee	Source
25 August 2020	GK	(Algeria) Houssem Limane	MC Oran	Free transfer	
4 September 2020	MF	(Algeria) Sid Ahmed Aouadj	(United Arab Emirates) Dibba Al-Hisn	Free transfer	
10 September 2020	DF	(Algeria) Houcine Benayada	(Tunisia) Club Africain	Free transfer	
15 September 2020	MF	(Algeria) Abou Sofiane Balegh	Unattached	Free transfer (Released)	
15 September 2020	FW	(Algeria) Youcef Islam Herida	Unattached	Free transfer (Released)	
15 September 2020	FW	(Algeria) Youcef Chibane	Unattached	Free transfer (Released)	
16 September 2020	FW	(Algeria) Ismail Belkacemi	USM Alger	Free transfer	
