= Sharaf Eldin Shiboub =

Sudanese association football player

Sharaf Shiboub
Personal information
- Full name: Sharafeldin Shiboub Ali Abdelrahman
- Date of birth: June 7, 1994 (age 32)
- Height: 1.82 m (6 ft 0 in)
- Position: Attacking midfielder

Team information
- Current team: Olympic Azzaweya SC
- Number: 11

Senior career*
Years	Team	Apps	(Gls)
2010–2012	Al-Mahdia SC		
2012–2014	Al-Mourada SC		
2014–2015	Al-Merrikh SC		
2016	JS Kairouan		
2016–2019	Al-Hilal Club		
2019–2020	Simba SC		
2020–2021	CS Constantine	17	(1)
2022	AS Soliman		
2022	S.C. Kiyovu Sports	0	(0)
2023	Al-Talaba SC		
2023-2024	APR F.C.		
2024-2025	Al-Hilal SC (Benghazi)		
2025-	Olympic Azzaweya SC		

International career
2015	Sudan U23	3	(0)
2019–	Sudan	18	(2)
- * Club domestic league appearances and goals

Sharaf Eldin Shaiboub Ali Abdelrahman (born 7 June 1994) is a Sudanese footballer who plays for the Sudan national football team.

== Club career ==
On 14 September, Sharaf Shibun joined to CS Constantine for two seasons, coming from Simba Sports Club. Shibun the second Sudanese international to play in the Algerian Ligue Professionnelle 1 after compatriot Mohamed Abderrahmane Al Ghorbal. On 24 October, it was presented to the audience.

== Career statistics ==
=== Club ===
As of 20 September 2020

Club	Season	League			Cup		Continental		Other		Total	
Club	Season	Division	Apps	Goals	Apps	Goals	Apps	Goals	Apps	Goals	Apps	Goals
CS Constantine	2020–21	Algerian Ligue 1	0	0	0	0	—		—		0	0
Total			0	0	0	0	0	0	0	0	0	0
Career total			0	0	0	0	0	0	0	0	0	0

== Honours ==
=== Club ===
Al-Merrikh SC

- Sudan Premier League (1): 2015
- Sudan Cup (2): 2014, 2015

Al-Hilal Club

- Sudan Premier League (2): 2016, 2017
- Sudan Cup (1): 2016

Simba SC

- Tanzanian Premier League (1): 2019-20
- Tanzanian Cup (1): 2019-20

APR F.C.

- Rwanda Premier League (1): 2023-24
