= Abdelkrim Louanchi =

Algerian footballer (born 2000)

Personal information
- Full name: Abdelkrim Louanchi
- Date of birth: 12 February 2000 (age 26)
- Place of birth: Bab El Oued, Algeria
- Position: Striker

Youth career
- –2020: USM Alger

Senior career*
| Years | Team | Apps | (Gls) |
| 2020–2021 | USM Alger | 3 | (0) |
| 2021– | MO Béjaïa | 0 | (0) |
- * Club domestic league appearances and goals as of 11 January

Abdelkrim Louanchi (Arabic: عبد الكريم لوانشي; born 12 February 2000) is an Algerian footballer who plays for MO Béjaïa in the Algerian Ligue 2.

== Career ==
In 2020, Louanchi was promoted to USM Alger's first team.

On 5 December 2020, Louanchi made his first league appearance against JS Saoura.
