= Sylvain Matrisciano =

French footballer and manager (born 1963)

Personal information
- Date of birth: 6 July 1963
- Place of birth: Besançon
- Position: Goalkeeper

Senior career*
Years	Team	Apps	(Gls)
1981–1983	Racing Besançon		
1983–1984	Lille OSC		
1984–1986	Racing Besançon		
1986–1992	AS Nancy		
1992–1993	US Valenciennes-Anzin		

Managerial career
- 1997–2001: Racing Besançon
- 2001–2002: US Lusitanos
- 2002–2003: Stade Brest
- 2014–2016: Girondins Bordeaux (coach)
- * Club domestic league appearances and goals

Sylvain Matrisciano (born 6 July 1963) is a retired French football goalkeeper and later manager.
