= Hamed Belem =

Burkinabé footballer

Personal information
- Date of birth: September 24, 1999 (age 27)
- Place of birth: Bobo-Dioulasso, Burkina Faso
- Position: Right winger

Youth career
- –: Rahimo FC

Senior career*
Years	Team	Apps	(Gls)
2015–2021	Rahimo FC	0	(0)
2021–2022	USM Alger	18	(1)

International career^{‡}
2020–2021	Burkina Faso A'	3	(0)
2021–2022	Burkina Faso	0	(0)
- * Club domestic league appearances and goals as of 11 December 2022 ‡ National team caps and goals as of 19 February 2021

Hamed Belem born September 24, 1999) is a Burkinabé professional footballer who plays as a right winger.

== Club career ==
On February 6, 2021, Belem joined USM Alger for two and a half year. After the announcement of the failure of the deal by Rahimo FC USMA threatened to go to FIFA, knowing that Belem was wanted by several clubs most notably TP Mazembe and Wydad Casablanca. Belem made his debut on 19 February 2021 as a substitute in a loss against US Biskra, In 17 round against ASO Chlef with the arrival of a new coach Belem made his first as a starter and provided his first assist to Zakaria Benchaâ in 3–0 victory. On March 20, 2021, Belem scored his first goal with his new club against JSM Skikda in 4–1 victory. On May 8, 2021, in the Algiers Derby, Belem suffered a knee injury and after that operated and unavailable for the rest of the season.

== International career ==
Belem was part of Burkina Faso squad at the African Nations Championship, and his first match was against Mali as a substitute after which Belem participated as a starter against Zimbabwe and Cameroon to end the campaign in the group stage.

== Career statistics ==
=== Club ===
As of 7 December 2022

Club	Season	League			Cup		Continental		Other		Total	
Club	Season	Division	Apps	Goals	Apps	Goals	Apps	Goals	Apps	Goals	Apps	Goals
Rahimo FC	2018–19	BPL	0	0	—		—		—		0	0
Rahimo FC	2019–20	BPL	0	0	—		—		—		0	0
Rahimo FC	2020–21	BPL	0	0	—		2 (Note: All appearance(s) in Champions League)	0	—		2	0
Rahimo FC	Total		0	0	—		2	0	—		2	0
USM Alger	2020–21	Ligue 1	7	1	—		—		1 (Note: All appearances in Algerian League Cup)	0	8	1
USM Alger	2021–22	Ligue 1	7	0	—		—		—		7	0
USM Alger	2022–23	Ligue 1	3	0	0	0	4 (Note: All appearance(s) in CAF Confederation Cup)	0	—		7	0
Total			17	1	0	0	4	0	—		22	1
Career total			17	1	0	0	6	0	1	0	24	1

== Honours ==
Rahimo FC

- Burkinabé Premier League: 2018–19
- Coupe du Faso: 2019
- Burkinabé SuperCup: 2020
