= Kwame Opoku =

Ghanaian footballer (born 1999)

Personal information
- Full name: Kwame Opoku
- Date of birth: 8 May 1999 (age 27)
- Place of birth: Kumasi, Ghana
- Position: Forward

Team information
- Current team: Bibiani Gold Stars
- Number: 31

Youth career
- Nkoranza Warriors

Senior career*
| Years | Team | Apps | (Gls) |
| –2020 | Nkoranza Warriors | | |
| 2020–2021 | Asante Kotoko | 16 | (7) |
| 2021–2023 | USM Alger | 34 | (5) |
| 2022 | → Najran SC (loan) | 2 | (0) |
| 2023–2024 | Olympique Khouribga | 9 | (3) |
| 2024–2026 | Asante Kotoko | 33 | (13) |
| 2026– | Bibiani Gold Stars | 9 | (4) |

International career^{‡}
| 2021– | Ghana | 4 | (0) |
- * Club domestic league appearances and goals as of 17 October 2026 ‡ National team caps and goals as of 12 June 2025

Kwame Opoku (born 8 May 1999) is a Ghanaian professional footballer who plays as a forward for Ghana Premier League club Bibiani GoldStars and the Ghana national football team.

Opoku began his career in Ghana with Metro Stars and Nkoranza Warriors before joining Asante Kotoko in 2020. After scoring seven goals in 16 league appearances during his first spell with Kotoko, he moved to Algerian club USM Alger in 2021. He later had spells with Saudi Arabian club Najran SC and Moroccan club Olympique Khouribga before returning to Asante Kotoko in December 2024. During his second spell, he helped the club win the 2024–25 Ghana FA Cup, the 2025 President's Cup and the 2025 Ghana Super Cup. He joined Bibiani GoldStars in August 2026.

At international level, Opoku represented Ghana at under-20 level and was also called up to the under-23 national team. He made his senior debut for Ghana in March 2021 during qualification for the 2021 Africa Cup of Nations. After a four-year absence from the national team, he was recalled in May 2025 for the 2025 Unity Cup.

== Club career ==
=== Early career ===
Opoku began his competitive football career with Cape Coast Metro Youth in 2016, scoring 18 goals in 19 appearances during his first season. After an injury-affected 2017 season, he joined Nkoranza Warriors during the second round of the 2018 campaign. He later scored 10 goals in 15 appearances for the club, including during the Normalisation Committee Special Competition. Opoku also had a brief spell with Serbian club Čukarički before returning to Ghana.

=== Asante Kotoko ===
In February 2020, Opoku joined Asante Kotoko from Nkoranza Warriors on a three-year contract. He made his Ghana Premier League debut for the club against Eleven Wonders on 15 November 2020, scoring Kotoko's goal in a 1–1 draw. He scored again in a 1–1 draw against Berekum Chelsea on 22 November.

On 11 January 2021, Opoku scored twice in a 2–0 victory over Liberty Professionals at the Accra Sports Stadium, with Fábio Gama providing the assists for both goals. The brace took his league tally to five goals in eight appearances. On 7 February, he scored in a 2–0 victory over Karela United, a result which moved Kotoko to the top of the Ghana Premier League table.

Opoku left Kotoko in March 2021 to join Algerian club USM Alger. He finished his first spell at Kotoko with seven goals in 16 league appearances and eight goals in 21 appearances across all competitions. At the time of his departure, he was the top goal scorer for the club in the 2020–21 season.

=== USM Alger ===
On 16 March 2021, Opoku signed a four and half years contract with Algerian Ligue Professionnelle 1 club USM Alger. On 8 May 2021, Opoku played his first competitive match in the Algerian League Cup in the Algiers Derby and scored a goal in the match that ended in 2–0 victory, which occurred on his 22nd birthday.

After joining them only in the second round of the season, Opoku made an immediate impact and ended his first season in Algeria with 5 goals and 4 assists in 17 appearances across all competitions. During the 2021–22 season, Opoku made 18 league appearances and scored once. His playing time during the campaign was affected by injuries.

==== Loan to Najran ====
In August 2022, Opoku joined Saudi Arabian club Najran SC on a season-long loan from USM Alger, with an option to make the transfer permanent. His spell in Saudi Arabia ended early, and he returned to USM Alger in January 2023.

=== Olympique Khouribga ===
On 31 January 2023, Opoku joined Moroccan club Olympique Khouribga on a permanent transfer from USM Alger, signing a two-and-a-half-year contract. He made six league appearances during the remainder of the 2022–23 season as Khouribga were relegated from the Botola Pro.

=== Return to Asante Kotoko ===
On 11 December 2024, Asante Kotoko announced the return of Opoku on a two-and-a-half-year contract, subject to a medical examination and international transfer clearance. He returned to the club as a free agent following his spell with Olympique Khouribga and was assigned the number 31 shirt.

Opoku made his second competitive debut for Kotoko on 27 December 2024 against Bibiani GoldStars at the Baba Yara Stadium. He marked his return with a goal in the 73rd minute, sealing a 2–0 victory after Justice Blay had opened the scoring from the penalty spot.

On 19 January 2025, Opoku scored twice as Kotoko defeated Vision 4–1 in the Ghana Premier League, scoring in the sixth and 37th minutes. He finished the 2024–25 league campaign with nine goals and two assists in 17 appearances.

Opoku also played a prominent role in Kotoko's 2024–25 FA Cup campaign, scoring four goals in five appearances in the competition. In the final against Golden Kick on 15 June 2025 at the University of Ghana Stadium, Opoku opened the scoring in the 17th minute from a Lord Amoah free kick. After Bless Ege equalised for Golden Kick, Opoku converted a penalty in added time to secure a 2–1 victory for Kotoko. The victory secured Kotoko's tenth Ghanaian FA Cup title and qualification for the 2025–26 CAF Confederation Cup. Opoku ended the season with 13 goals in 22 appearances across the Ghana Premier League and FA Cup.

On 6 July 2025, Opoku helped Kotoko win the President's Cup against rivals Hearts of Oak at the Accra Sports Stadium. With the match level at 1–1, Opoku scored the winning goal as Kotoko came from behind to secure a 2–1 victory.

On 31 August 2025, he added another trophy as Kotoko defeated reigning Ghana Premier League champions Bibiani GoldStars 1–0 to win the 2025 Champion of Champions.

During the 2025–26 season, Opoku remained part of Kotoko's attacking options. He scored four goals in 16 league appearances. Among his goals was an equaliser in a 2–1 defeat to Basake Holy Stars.

Opoku left Asante Kotoko following the conclusion of the 2025–26 season, despite having time remaining on the two-and-a-half-year contract he had signed upon his return.

=== Bibiani GoldStars ===
On 23 August 2026, Bibiani GoldStars announced the signing of Opoku following his departure from Asante Kotoko. He joined the club on a one-year contract ahead of the 2026–27 Ghana Premier League season.

Opoku subsequently joined his new teammates in training at the University of Ghana Stadium as GoldStars prepared for the GHALCA Top 4 tournament and the 2026–27 season.

== International career ==
Before making his senior international debut, Opoku was involved with Ghana's youth national teams. He was invited to the Ghana U20 team in 2018 during preparations for the Africa U-20 Cup of Nations qualifiers. Opoku later stated that he featured in five friendly matches for the team and scored three goals. He was also part of the U20 setup ahead of the 2019 Africa U-20 Cup of Nations, but was omitted from the final squad for the tournament.

In August 2019, Opoku was called up to the Ghana U23 squad as the team prepared for their Africa U-23 Cup of Nations qualifying tie against Algeria. He did not feature in the qualifier, later stating that passport issues prevented him from playing.

In March 2021, Opoku received his first call-up to the Ghana national football team when head coach Charles Akonnor named him in the squad for the final two 2021 Africa Cup of Nations qualification matches against South Africa and São Tomé and Príncipe.

Opoku made his senior international debut on 25 March 2021 in Ghana's 1–1 draw with South Africa in Johannesburg. The result secured Ghana's qualification for the 2021 Africa Cup of Nations. He also featured in the final qualifying match against São Tomé and Príncipe on 28 March, coming on as a substitute as Ghana won 3–1 at the Accra Sports Stadium to finish top of Group C.

In June 2021, Opoku was called up for Ghana's international friendlies against Morocco and Ivory Coast as part of preparations for the 2022 FIFA World Cup qualifiers.

After an absence of approximately four years from the national team, Opoku was recalled by head coach Otto Addo in May 2025 for the 2025 Unity Cup in London. At the time of his recall, he had made three senior appearances for Ghana.

On 28 May 2025, Opoku started for Ghana against Nigeria in the Unity Cup semi-final at the Gtech Community Stadium in London. He played the first half before being replaced by Brandon Thomas-Asante as Ghana lost 2–1.

== Career statistics ==
=== Club ===
As of 17 October 2026

| Club | Season | League | | | Cup | | Continental | | Other | | Total | |
| Club | Season | Division | Apps | Goals | Apps | Goals | Apps | Goals | Apps | Goals | Apps | Goals |
|---|---|---|---|---|---|---|---|---|---|---|---|---|
| Asante Kotoko | 2020–21 | Ghana Premier League | 16 | 7 | 0 | 0 | 5 (Note: three appearances in CAF Champions League, two appearances and one goal in CAF Confederation Cup) | 1 | — | | 21 | 8 |
| USM Alger | 2020–21 | Ligue 1 | 16 | 4 | — | | — | | 1 (Note: All appearances in Algerian League Cup) | 1 | 17 | 5 |
| USM Alger | 2021–22 | Ligue 1 | 18 | 1 | — | | — | | — | | 18 | 1 |
| Total | | | 34 | 5 | — | | — | | 1 | 1 | 35 | 6 |
| Olympique Khouribga | 2022–23 | Botola Pro | 6 | 0 | | | — | | — | | 6 | 0 |
| Olympique Khouribga | 2023–24 | Botola Pro D2 | 3 | 3 | | | — | | — | | 3 | 3 |
| Total | | | 9 | 0 | | | — | | — | | 9 | 3 |
| Asante Kotoko | 2024–25 | Ghana Premier League | 17 | 9 | 5 | 4 | — | | 1 (Note: Appearance in Ghana Super Cup) | 1 | 23 | 14 |
| Asante Kotoko | 2025–26 | Ghana Premier League | 16 | 4 | 0 | 0 | 0 | 0 | 1 (Note: Appearance in GHALCA President's Cup) | 0 | 17 | 4 |
| Total | | | 33 | 13 | 5 | 4 | 0 | 0 | 2 | 1 | 40 | 18 |
| Bibiani GoldStars | 2026–27 | Ghana Premier League | 6 | 3 | 0 | 0 | — | | — | | 6 | 3 |
| Career total | | | 98 | 31 | 5 | 4 | 5 | 1 | 3 | 2 | 111 | 38 |

== Honours ==
Asante Kotoko

- Ghana FA Cup: 2024–25
- Ghana Super Cup: 2025
- President's Cup: 2025
