= Alexis Guendouz =

Algerian footballer (born 1996)

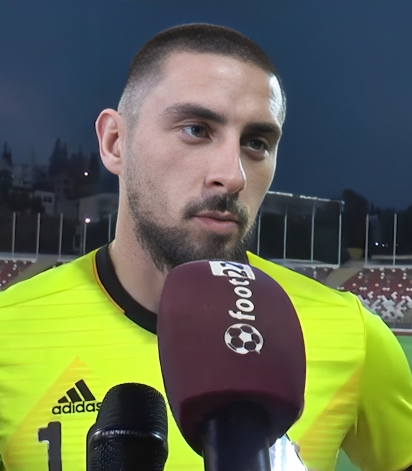
- Guendouz with Algeria in 2022

Personal information
- Date of birth: 26 January 1996 (age 30)
- Place of birth: Saint-Étienne, France
- Height: 1.91 m (6 ft 3 in)
- Position: Goalkeeper

Team information
- Current team: JS Kabylie
- Number: 16

Youth career
- –2009: Olympique Saint-Étienne
- 2009–2015: AS Saint-Étienne

Senior career*
Years	Team	Apps	(Gls)
2014–2017	AS Saint-Étienne B	26	(0)
2017–2020	AS Saint-Étienne	0	(0)
2018–2020	→ Pau (loan)	53	(0)
2020–2022	USM Alger	23	(0)
2022–2024	CR Belouizdad	47	(0)
2024–2025	Persepolis	27	(0)
2025–2026	MC Alger	15	(0)
2026–	JS Kabylie	9	(0)

International career^{‡}
2022–2023	Algeria A'	11	(0)
2023–	Algeria	9	(0)
Medal record
Men's football
Representing Algeria
African Nations Championship
Runner-up	2022 Algeria
- * Club domestic league appearances and goals as of 21:08, 19 November 2026 (UTC) ‡ National team caps and goals as of 18 November 2025

Alexis Guendouz (born 26 January 1996) is a professional footballer who plays as a goalkeeper for JS Kabylie. Born in France, he represents the Algeria national team.

== Club career ==
On 25 July 2018, Guendouz renewed his contract with Saint-Étienne until 2020 and was loaned to Championnat National club Pau for one season. On 4 July 2019, he renewed his loan agreement in Pau for another season, helping the club secure promotion to Ligue 2, and concluding his tenure there with 21 clean sheets across 57 matches. In September 2020, he signed a two-year contract with USM Alger coming from AS Saint-Étienne for €15,000. After the end of his contract with USM Alger, Guendouz announced his departure via a post on his official Instagram account. Guendouz then signed with then Algerian champions CR Belouizdad on a 2-year contract.

=== Persepolis ===
On 31 July 2024, Guendouz signed a 3-year contract with Persepolis and joined the 16-time Persian Gulf Pro League champions.

Guendouz made his debut for the club on 15 August, in a 1–1 draw against Zob Ahan in the Persian Gulf Pro League.

=== JS Kabylie ===
On 10 August 2026, he joined JS Kabylie, signing a three-year contract with the Kabyle club.

== International career ==
In June 2022, Guendouz was called up by Madjid Bougherra for the first time to the Algeria A' national team to the Four Nations tournament. His first match came against Niger and ended with a 1–0 win. On 2 January 2023, Guendouz was selected for the 28-man squad to participate in the 2022 African Nations Championship.

== Career statistics ==
=== Club ===
As of 19 November 2026

Appearances and goals by club, season, and competition
Club	Season	League			Cup		Continental		Other		Total	
Club	Season	Division	Apps	Goals	Apps	Goals	Apps	Goals	Apps	Goals	Apps	Goals
→ Pau FC (loan)	2018–19	National 1 (France)	28	0	2	0	—				30	0
→ Pau FC (loan)	2019–20	National 1 (France)	25	0	2	0	—				27	0
→ Pau FC (loan)	Total		53	0	4	0	—				57	0
USM Alger	2020–21	Algerian Ligue Professionnelle 1	12	0	—				1 (Note: All appearances in Algerian Super Cup)	0	13	0
USM Alger	2021–22	Algerian Ligue Professionnelle 1	10	0	—						10	0
USM Alger	Total		22	0	—				1	0	23	0
CR Belouizdad	2022–23	Algerian Ligue Professionnelle 1	25	0	3	0	12 (Note: All appearance(s) in Champions League)	0	—		40	0
CR Belouizdad	2023–24	Algerian Ligue Professionnelle 1	22	0	5	0	6	0	1 (Note: All appearances in Arab Club Champions Cup)	0	34	0
CR Belouizdad	Total		47	0	8	0	18	0	1	0	74	0
Persepolis F.C.	2024–25	Persian Gulf Pro League	27	0	1	0	8	0	1	0	37	0
MC Alger	2025–26	Algerian Ligue Professionnelle 1	15	0	3	0	10	0	1	0	29	0
JS Kabylie	2026–27	Algerian Ligue Professionnelle 1	9	0	0	0	—				9	0
Career total			173	0	16	0	36	0	4	0	229	0

== Honours ==
CR Belouizdad

- Algerian Ligue Professionnelle 1: 2022–23
- Algerian Cup: 2023–24

Algeria A'

- African Nations Championship runner-up: 2022

Individual

- Algerian Ligue Professionnelle 1 Team of the Season: 2022–23
