= Houari Baouche =

Algerian footballer (born 1995)

Personal information
- Date of birth: 24 December 1995 (age 30)
- Place of birth: Thenia, Algeria
- Height: 1.83 m (6 ft 0 in)
- Position: Left back

Team information
- Current team: MC Oran
- Number: 22

Youth career
- –2016: ASM Oran

Senior career*
Years	Team	Apps	(Gls)
2016–2017	ES Mostaganem		
2017–2019	O Médéa	52	(2)
2019–2020	CA Bordj Bou Arréridj	20	(0)
2020–2021	USM Bel-Abbès	8	(0)
2021–2023	USM Alger	40	(0)
2023–2026	CS Constantine	72	(0)
2026–	MC Oran	0	(0)
- * Club domestic league appearances and goals as of 1 July 2026

Houari Baouche (Arabic: هواري بعوش; born 24 December 1995) is an Algerian professional footballer who plays as a left back for MC Oran in the Algerian Ligue Professionnelle 1 and the Algeria national team.

== Career ==
In 2016, Baouche signed a contract with ES Mostaganem. In 2017, Baouche signed a contract with O Médéa. In 2019, Baouche signed a contract with CA Bordj Bou Arréridj. In 2020, Baouche signed a two-year contract with USM Bel-Abbès. In 2021, Baouche signed a two-year contract with USM Alger. In 2023, Baouche signed a two-year contract with CS Constantine. On 30 June 2026, he joined MC Oran.

== Honours ==
USM Alger

- CAF Confederation Cup: 2022–23
