= Oussama Abdeldjelil =

Algerian footballer (born 1993)

Personal information
- Date of birth: 23 June 1993 (age 33)
- Place of birth: Remchi, Algeria
- Height: 1.87 m (6 ft 2 in)
- Position: Forward

Team information
- Current team: Fréjus Saint-Raphaël

Youth career
- 1999–2007: Beligny RC
- 2007–2008: AS Limas
- 2008–2012: Villefranche

Senior career*
Years	Team	Apps	(Gls)
2012–2013	Fréjus	14	(3)
2013–2014	Tarbes	20	(7)
2014–2015	Lyon-Duchère	5	(1)
2015	Kabylie	12	(0)
2015–2016	Saint-Priest	7	(5)
2016	Tadjenanet	3	(0)
2016–2017	Saint-Priest	21	(13)
2017–2018	Dijon II	9	(7)
2018–2019	Cholet	22	(11)
2019	Red Star	18	(5)
2019–2020	Paris FC	14	(0)
2020	Cholet	3	(0)
2020–2021	USM Alger	3	(0)
2021	Boulogne	9	(2)
2021–2022	Épinal	20	(9)
2022–2023	Sedan	20	(1)
2023–2024	Cholet	28	(6)
2024–2025	Nîmes	30	(15)
2025–	Fréjus Saint-Raphaël	0	(0)

International career
2015	Algeria U23	1	(0)
- * Club domestic league appearances and goals as of 26 May 2025

Oussama Abdeldjelil (born 23 June 1993) is an Algerian professional footballer who plays as a forward for Championnat National 1 club Fréjus Saint-Raphaël.

== Club career ==
Abdeldjelil was born in Algeria, and moved to France at the age of 6. He began playing football with local clubs Belligny and Villefranche before moving to semi-professional teams in France and Algeria.

On 8 January 2019, Abdeldjelil signed a professional contract with Red Star in the French Ligue 2, after beginning the season as the top scorer in the Championnat National with Cholet. He made his professional debut with Red Star in a 1–0 Ligue 2 win over Lens on 14 January 2019 scoring the only and game-winning goal.

In the summer of 2019, Abdeldjelil signed for neighbouring Ligue 2 club Paris FC after Red Star were relegated at the end of the 2018–19 Ligue 2 season. With no goals in 14 appearances, he left the club and returned to Cholet in January 2020.

In June 2020, Abdeldjelil was recruited by former Orléans sporting director Antar Yahia, to play for USM Alger in his country of birth.

On 31 January 2021, Abdeldjelil signed for French Championnat National club Boulogne on a contract until the end of the season, having terminated his contract with USM Alger. He was credited by some sources as scoring a hattrick in his first appearance for the club, in the clubs eighth-round Coupe de France game on 16 February 2021, although some sources at the time gave the third goal as an own goal.

On 29 July 2024, Abdeldjelil signed for Championnat National club Nîmes. On 8 July 2025, he signed for Championnat National 2 club Fréjus Saint-Raphaël.

== International career ==
Abdeldjelil was born in Algeria, and represented the Algeria U23 for Olympic Games qualification.

== Career statistics ==
=== Club ===
As of 19 August 2024

Appearances and goals by club, season and competition
Club	Season	League			National Cup		Other		Total	
Club	Season	Division	Apps	Goals	Apps	Goals	Apps	Goals	Apps	Goals
Fréjus	2012-13	CFA2	14	3	—		—		14	3
Tarbes	2013-14	CFA	20	7	—		—		20	7
Lyon-Duchère	2014-15	CFA	5	1	—		—		5	1
Kabylie	2014-15	Algerian Ligue 1	12	0	—		—		12	0
Saint-Priest	2015-16	CFA2	7	5	—		—		7	5
Tadjenanet	2015-16	Algerian Ligue 1	3	0	—		—		3	0
Saint-Priest	2016-17	CFA2	21	13	—		—		21	13
Saint-Priest	2017-18	Championnat National 2	0	0	—		—		0	0
Saint-Priest	Total		21	13	—		—		21	13
Dijon B	2017-18	Championnat National 3	9	7	—		0	0	9	7
Cholet	2017-18	Championnat National	9	3	—		—		9	3
Cholet	2018-19	Championnat National	13	8	1	0	—		14	8
Cholet	Total		22	11	1	0	—		23	11
Red Star	2018-19	Ligue 2	18	5	—		—		18	5
Paris FC	2019-20	Ligue 2	14	0	2	0	3 (Note: Appearance(s) in Coupe de la Ligue)	1	19	1
Cholet	2019-20	Championnat National	3	0	—		—		3	0
USM Alger	2019-20	Algerian Ligue 1	—		—		1 (Note: Appearance(s) in Algerian Super Cup)	0	1	0
USM Alger	2020-21	Algerian Ligue 1	3	0	—		—		3	0
USM Alger	Total		3	0	—		1	0	4	0
Boulogne	2020-21	Championnat National	9	2	3	3	—		12	5
Épinal	2021-22	Championnat National 2	15	7	—		—		15	7
Épinal	2022-23	Championnat National 2	5	2	—		—		5	2
Épinal	Total		20	9	—		—		20	9
Sedan	2022-23	Championnat National	20	1	—		—		20	1
Cholet	2023-24	Championnat National	28	6	1	0	—		29	6
Nîmes	2024-25	Championnat National	1	1	—		—		1	1
Career Total			229	71	7	3	4	1	240	75
