= Fateh Achour =

Algerian footballer (born 1994)

Personal information
- Full name: Fateh Achour
- Date of birth: 15 August 1994 (age 32)
- Place of birth: Bordj Menaïel, Algeria
- Position: Right back

Team information
- Current team: USM El Harrach

Youth career
- –2015: USM Alger

Senior career*
Years	Team	Apps	(Gls)
2015–2017	US Beni Douala		
2017–2018	GC Mascara		
2018–2020	USM Bel Abbès	26	(0)
2020–2022	USM Alger	28	(0)
2022–2024	ASO Chlef	34	(0)
2024-2025	NA Hussein Dey		
2025–2026	USM Annaba		
2026–	USM El Harrach		
- * Club domestic league appearances and goals as of 23 July 2026

Fateh Achour (Arabic: فاتح عاشور; born 15 August 1994) is an Algerian footballer who plays for USM El Harrach in the Algerian Ligue 2.

== Career ==
In 2018, Achour signed a two-year contract with USM Bel Abbès. In 2020, he signed a two-year contract with USM Alger. In 2022, he joined ASO Chlef. In 2024, he signed for NA Hussein Dey. In 2025, he joined USM Annaba. On 23 July 2026, he joined USM El Harrach.

== Honours ==
ASO Chlef

- Algerian Cup: 2022–23
