= Abdelmoumen Sifour =

Algerian footballer (born 1998)

Personal information
- Full name: Abdelmoumen Sifour
- Date of birth: 3 March 1998 (age 28)
- Place of birth: Bir Mourad Raïs, Algeria
- Height: 1.85 m (6 ft 1 in)
- Position: Goalkeeper

Team information
- Current team: USM Alger
- Number: 1

Youth career
- –2016: Paradou AC
- 2016–2019: USM Alger

Senior career*
Years	Team	Apps	(Gls)
2018–2021	USM Alger	9	(0)
2021–2023	RC Arbaâ	31	(0)
2023–	USM Alger	5	(0)

International career^{‡}
2017–	Algeria U20	2	(0)
2018–	Algeria U23	3	(0)
- * Club domestic league appearances and goals as of 6 June 2026 ‡ National team caps and goals as of 18 November 2018

Abdelmoumen Sifour (Arabic: عبد المؤمن سيفور; born March 3, 1998) is an Algerian footballer who plays as a goalkeeper for USM Alger in the Algerian Ligue Professionnelle 1.

== Club career ==
In 2019, Abdelmoumen Sifour was promoted to USM Alger's first team. In 2021, he joined RC Arbaâ. On 20 August 2023, Sifour returned to USM Alger.

== Honours ==
USM Alger

- Algerian Cup: 2024–25, 2025–26
- CAF Confederation Cup: 2025–26
