= Anis Khemaissia =

Algerian footballer (born 1999)

Personal information
- Date of birth: 27 January 1999 (age 27)
- Place of birth: Guelma, Algeria
- Position: Left-back

Team information
- Current team: ES Sétif
- Number: 19

Youth career
- 2017–2018: USM Annaba

Senior career*
Years	Team	Apps	(Gls)
2018–2019	USM Annaba		
2019–2022	USM Alger	11	(1)
2021–2022	→ USM Annaba		
2022–2023	HB Chelghoum Laïd	9	(0)
2023–2025	MC El Bayadh	39	(0)
2025–2026	Al Hilal SC		
2026–	ES Sétif	0	(0)
- * Club domestic league appearances and goals as of 15 June 2026

Anis Khemaissia (Arabic: أنيس خمايسية; born 27 January 1999) is an Algerian professional footballer who most recently played as a left-back for ES Sétif.

== Career ==
In 2019, Khemaissia signed a contract with USM Alger. In 2021, he signed a one-year loan contract with USM Annaba. In 2022, he joined HB Chelghoum Laïd. In 2023, he joined MC El Bayadh. In 2025, he signed for Libyan club Al Hilal SC. On 15 June 2026, he joined ES Sétif.
