= Mehdi Beneddine =

French footballer (born 1996)

Personal information
- Date of birth: 26 February 1996 (age 30)
- Place of birth: Nîmes, France
- Height: 1.77 m (5 ft 10 in)
- Position: Defender

Team information
- Current team: CS Constantine
- Number: 21

Youth career
- 2001–2008: OC Bellegardais
- 2008–2010: Nîmes
- 2010–2011: Nîmes Lasallien
- 2011–2015: Monaco

Senior career*
Years	Team	Apps	(Gls)
2015–2018	Monaco B	49	(2)
2017	→ Cercle Brugge (loan)	10	(0)
2018–2020	Quevilly-Rouen	18	(0)
2019	Quevilly-Rouen B	2	(0)
2020–2022	USM Alger	31	(0)
2022	→ Châteauroux (loan)	14	(1)
2023–2024	Le Puy	24	(3)
2024–2025	Nîmes	28	(0)
2025–2026	Toulon	12	(0)
2026	Châteauroux	13	(2)
2026–	CS Constantine	0	(0)
- * Club domestic league appearances and goals as of 28 July 2026

Mehdi Beneddine (Arabic: مهدي بن الدين; born 26 February 1996) is a French professional footballer who plays as a defender for CS Constantine.

== Club career ==
=== Monaco ===
Beneddine made his debut for the Monaco B team aged 17 in a match against Mont-de-Marsan on 24 May 2014, coming on for Morgan Kamin in the 83rd minute. He went on to make 49 appearances for the Monaco reserve team.

==== Loan to Cercle Brugge ====
On 1 January 2017, Beneddine joined Belgian side Cercle Brugge on a six-month loan until 30 June 2017. Over one month later on 26 February, he made his debut in a 3–1 away win against Tubize, playing the full 90 minutes.

=== Quevilly-Rouen ===
On 27 June 2018, Beneddine signed a contract with Quevilly-Rouen.

=== USM Alger ===
In 2020, Beneddine signed a contract with Algerian club USM Alger.

==== Loan to Châteauroux ====
On 30 December 2021, Beneddine joined Châteauroux on a six-month loan until 30 June 2022.

=== CS Constantine ===
On 28 July, he joined Algerian club CS Constantine.

== Personal life ==
Mehdi Beneddine was born in Nîmes in the Southern France. He holds both French and Algerian nationalities.
