= 2017–18 USM Bel-Abbès season =

USM Bel-Abbès
2017–18 season
- Chairman: Abdelghani El Hannani
- Head coach: Tahar Chérif El-Ouazzani
- Stadium: Stade 24 Fevrier 1956
- Ligue 1: 10th
- Algerian Cup: Winners
- Top goalscorer: League: Abdennour Belhocini (6); All: Abdennour Belhocini (6); Habib Bouguelmouna (6)

In the 2017–18 season, USM Bel-Abbès competed in the Ligue 1 for the 23rd season, as well as the Algerian Cup.

== Squad list ==
Players and squad numbers last updated on 25 August 2017.
Note: Flags indicate national team as has been defined under FIFA eligibility rules. Players may hold more than one non-FIFA nationality.

No.	Nat.	Position	Name	Date of birth (age)	Signed from
Goalkeepers
1	(Algeria)	GK	Nadjib Ghoul	12 September 1985 (aged 31)	(Algeria) CS Constantine
16	(Algeria)	GK	Athmane Toual	17 July 1984 (aged 33)	(Algeria) ESM Koléa
30	(Algeria)	GK	Abdelkader Zarat Belmokhtar	28 August 1995 (aged 21)	(Algeria) Youth system
Defenders
25	(Algeria)	CB	Farès Benabderahmane	11 August 1987 (aged 30)	(Algeria) RC Relizane
22	(Algeria)	LB	Sofiane Bengoureïne	10 October 1984 (aged 32)	(Algeria) USM Annaba
19	(Algeria)	CB	Zakaria Khali	10 May 1990 (aged 27)	(Algeria) Youth system
15	(Algeria)	LB	Nabil Lamara	15 August 1993 (aged 24)	(Algeria) Olympique de Médéa
20	(Algeria)	RB	Abderrahim Abdelli	9 August 1996 (aged 21)	(Algeria) Youth system
4	(Algeria)	CB	Nour El Islam Salah	17 March 1993 (aged 24)	Unattached
2	(Algeria)	RB	Samir Zerrouki	4 September 1993 (aged 23)	(Algeria) ?
24	(Algeria)	CB	Anes Abbas	7 October 1996 (aged 20)	(Algeria) Youth system
Midfielders
10	(Algeria)	DM	Abdessamed Bounoua	24 April 1991 (aged 26)	(Algeria) Youth system
27	(Algeria)	RW	Abdelkrim Zouari	14 July 1989 (aged 28)	(Algeria) MC Saïda
29	(Algeria)	DM	Yahia Labani	16 August 1991 (aged 26)	(Algeria) USMM Hadjout
28	(Algeria)	AM	Sid Ahmed El Mahi	28 February 1996 (aged 21)	(Algeria) Youth system
12	(Algeria)	DM	Malek Ferhat	7 March 1989 (aged 28)	(Algeria) MO Béjaïa
6	(Algeria)		Mohamed Lagraâ	7 November 1986 (aged 30)	(Algeria) JS Saoura
26	(Algeria)		Mouloud Nabil Metref	29 July 1996 (aged 21)	(Algeria) Youth system
5	(Algeria)	AM	Larbi Tabti	23 April 1993 (aged 24)	(Algeria) ASM Oran
Forwards
18	(Algeria)		Djamel Chettal	23 May 1992 (aged 25)	(Algeria) DRB Tadjenanet
7	(Algeria)		Abdennour Belhocini	18 August 1996 (aged 21)	(Algeria) Youth system
14	(Algeria)		Habib Bouguelmouna	12 December 1988 (aged 28)	(Algeria) CA Bordj Bou Arréridj
8	(Algeria)		Hamza Belahouel	8 June 1993 (aged 24)	(Algeria) ES Mostaganem
	(Algeria)		Dhira El Habib Bouchentouf	26 November 1998 (aged 18)	(Algeria) Youth system
9	(Algeria)		Ameur Bouguettaya	21 July 1995 (aged 22)	(Algeria) Youth system
17	(Algeria)		Billel Mebarki	10 January 1988 (aged 29)	(Algeria) USM El Harrach
21	(Algeria)		Mohamed Seguer	7 September 1985 (aged 31)	(Algeria) MC Alger

== Competitions ==
=== Overview ===
Competition	Record								Started round	Final position / round	First match	Last match
Competition	G	W	D	L	GF	GA	GD	Win %	Started round	Final position / round	First match	Last match
Ligue 1	30	12	7	11	32	31	+1	40.00	—N/a	10th	26 August 2017	19 May 2018
Algerian Cup	6	5	1	0	9	2	+7	83.33	Round of 64	Winners	29 December 2017	1 May 2018
Total	36	17	8	11	41	33	+8	47.22				

Updated to match played 19 May 2018
Source: Competitions

== League table ==
Pos	Team	Pld	W	D	L	GF	GA	GD	Pts	Qualification or relegation
8	ES Sétif	30	10	10	10	35	30	+5	40	Qualification for 2018–19 Arab Club Champions Cup
9	DRB Tadjenanet	30	10	7	13	33	41	−8	37 (Note: Ranked on head-to-head results.)	
10	USM Bel Abbès (Note: USM Bel Abbès were deducted 6 points. FIFA's decision was taken at its meeting on 9 June 2017, ordering the club to pay the amount due to the player Jessy Mayele as well as a fine of CHF 15,000 (15,000 Swiss francs).)	30	12	7	11	32	31	+1	37	Qualification for the 2018–19 Confederation Cup
11	JS Kabylie	30	8	12	10	34	39	−5	36 (Note: Ranked on head-to-head results.)	
12	CR Belouizdad	30	7	15	8	24	27	−3	36	

Updated to match(es) played on 19 May 2018. Source: DZFoot
Rules for classification: 1) points; 2) head-to-head points; 3) head-to-head goal difference; 4) goal difference; 5) total goals; 6) fairplay ranking; 7) playoff.

=== Results summary ===
Overall								Home						Away					
Pld	W	D	L	GF	GA	GD	Pts	W	D	L	GF	GA	GD	W	D	L	GF	GA	GD
30	12	7	11	32	31	+1	43	7	3	5	18	15	+3	5	4	6	14	16	−2

Last updated: 13 June 2018.
Source: Competitive matches

=== Results by round ===
Round	1	2	3	4	5	6	7	8	9	10	11	12	13	14	15	16	17	18	19	20	21	22	23	24	25	26	27	28	29	30
Ground	A	H	A	H	A	H	A	H	A	H	A	A	H	A	H	H	A	H	A	H	A	H	A	H	A	H	H	A	H	A
Result	L	W	L	W	D	W	D	L	D	D	L	W	L	L	W	W	W	L	W	L	L	W	W	L	L	L	W	W	D	D
Position	14	11	12	7	8	7	7	8	8	9	10	9	9	10	9	7	9	9	9	9	10	9	9	9	10	13	10	9	9	10

Updated to match(es) played on 13 June 2018. Source: Competitive matches
A = Away; H = Home; W = Win; D = Draw; L = Loss

=== Matches ===
Win Draw Loss

25 August 2017 Round 1	CR Belouizdad	2–0	USM Bel-Abbès	Belouizdad
17:00	Lakroum 58'; Hamia 69'	Soccerway report Live TV: EPTV Terrestre / Algérie 3		Stadium: Stade 20 Août 1955; Referee: Abderrezzak Arab

9 September 2017 Round 2	USM Bel-Abbès	2–1	Olympique de Médéa	Sidi Bel Abbès
17:00	Bounoua 35' (pen.); Bouguelmouna 76'	Soccerway report Live TV: None	49' Koulkheir	Stadium: Stade 24 Fevrier 1956; Referee: Rafik Achouri

15 September 2017 Round 3	CS Constantine	1–0	USM Bel-Abbès	Constantine
17:45	Cissé 43' (pen.)	Soccerway report Live TV: TV Tamazight 4		Stadium: Stade Mohamed Hamlaoui; Referee: Merzak Halalchi

3 October 2017 Round 4	USM Bel-Abbès	2–0	USM Alger	Sidi Bel Abbès
17:00	Bounoua 21'; Belhocini 45+1'	Soccerway report Live TV: EPTV Terrestre / Canal Algérie		Stadium: Stade 24 Fevrier 1956; Referee: Said Aouina

29 September 2017 Round 5	MC Oran	1–1	USM Bel-Abbès	Oran
17:00	Toumi 90+1'	Soccerway report Live TV: TV Tamazight 4	62' Tabti	Stadium: Ahmed Zabana Stadium; Referee: Lahlou Benbraham

12 October 2017 Round 6	USM Bel-Abbès	4–1	JS Kabylie	Sidi Bel Abbès
17:45	Belhocini 22', 26'; Belahouel 71'; Kherbache 90'	Soccerway report Live TV: TV Tamazight 4	47' (pen.) Boukhenchouche	Stadium: Stade 24 Fevrier 1956; Referee: Boubekeur Zouaoui

17 October 2017 Round 7	USM Blida	2–2	USM Bel-Abbès	Blida
16:00	Aissa El Bey 15'; Frioui 72'	Soccerway report Live TV: None	54' Zouari; 65' Belhocini	Stadium: Brakni Brothers Stadium; Referee: Abderrezzak Arab

21 October 2017 Round 8	USM Bel-Abbès	0–1	Paradou AC	Sidi Bel Abbès
17:00		Soccerway report Live TV: Canal Algérie	53' Ben Khelifa	Stadium: Stade 24 Fevrier 1956; Referee: Rafik Achouri

28 October 2017 Round 9	NA Hussein Dey	1–1	USM Bel-Abbès	Belouizdad
17:00	Oukkal 66'	Soccerway report Live TV: Algérie 3	63' (o.g.) Merbah	Stadium: Stade 20 Août 1955; Referee: Amine Hansal

3 November 2017 Round 10	USM Bel-Abbès	1–1	DRB Tadjenanet	Sidi Bel Abbès
15:00	Bouguelmouna 10'	Soccerway report Live TV: EPTV Terrestre / Canal Algérie	31' Attouche	Stadium: Stade 24 Fevrier 1956; Referee: Lyés Bekouassa

11 November 2017 Round 11	JS Saoura	1–0	USM Bel-Abbès	Béchar
18:00	Djallit 30'	Soccerway report Live TV: None		Stadium: Stade 20 Août 1955; Referee: Mohamed Saïdi

17 November 2017 Round 12	USM El Harrach	1–2	USM Bel-Abbès	Algiers
15:00	Bouguèche 70'	Soccerway report Live TV: None	10', 61' Zouari	Stadium: Stade 1er Novembre 1954; Referee: Farouk Mial

2 December 2017 Round 13	USM Bel-Abbès	1–1	MC Alger	Sidi Bel Abbès
16:00	Khali 67'	Soccerway report Live TV: Algérie 3	37' (pen.) Hachoud	Stadium: Stade 24 Fevrier 1956; Referee: Said Aouina

9 December 2017 Round 14	US Biskra	2–1	USM Bel-Abbès	Biskra
15:00	Berbache 3'; Chaouti 69'	Soccerway report Live TV: None	13' Khali	Stadium: El Alia Sports Complex; Referee: Ahmed Bouzrar

16 December 2017 Round 15	USM Bel-Abbès	2–1	ES Sétif	Sidi Bel Abbès
16:00	Belhocini 44'; Bouguelmouna 47'	Soccerway report Live TV: Algérie 3	17' Nadji	Stadium: Stade 24 Fevrier 1956; Referee: Lyés Bekouassa

6 January 2018 Round 16	USM Bel-Abbès	1–0	CR Belouizdad	Sidi Bel Abbès
16:00	Belhocini 4'	Soccerway report Live TV: Canal Algérie		Stadium: Stade 24 Fevrier 1956; Referee: Merzoug Brahimi

20 January 2018 Round 17	Olympique de Médéa	0–1	USM Bel-Abbès	Médéa
15:00		Soccerway report Live TV: None	85' Bellahouel	Stadium: Stade Imam Lyes de Médéa; Referee: Amine Sekhraoui

26 January 2018 Round 18	USM Bel-Abbès	1–2	CS Constantine	Sidi Bel Abbès
16:00	Bouguelmouna 86'	Soccerway report Live TV: EPTV Terrestre / Canal Algérie	13' Arroussi; 56' Abid	Stadium: Stade 24 Fevrier 1956; Referee: Lotfi Bekouassa

9 February 2018 Round 19	USM Alger	1–2	USM Bel-Abbès	Algiers
17:00	Hajhouj 14'	Soccerway report Live TV: EPTV Terrestre / TV Tamazight 4	75' Seguer; 85' Tabti	Stadium: July 5, 1962 Stadium; Referee: Boubekeur Zouaoui

17 February 2018 Round 20	USM Bel-Abbès	2–5	MC Oran	Sidi Bel Abbès
16:00	Zouari 24' (pen.); Bouguettaya 85'	Soccerway report Live TV: Canal Algérie	6' Bentiba; 22', 38' Mansouri; 69' Belal; 86' Frifer	Stadium: Stade 24 Fevrier 1956; Referee: Lyés Bekouassa

23 February 2018 Round 21	JS Kabylie	2–1	USM Bel-Abbès	Tizi Ouzou
16:00	Hammar 15' (pen.); Benaldjia 56'	Soccerway report Live TV: Algérie 3 / TV Tamazight 4	72' Seguer	Stadium: November 1, 1954 Stadium; Referee: Hamza Bouslimani

10 March 2018 Round 22	USM Bel-Abbès	1–0	USM Blida	Sidi Bel Abbès
16:00	Bouguelmouna 52'	Soccerway report Live TV: None		Stadium: Stade 24 Fevrier 1956; Referee: Lahlou Benbraham

15 March 2018 Round 23	Paradou AC	0–1	USM Bel-Abbès	Bologhine
17:00		Soccerway report Live TV: None	35' Abdelli	Stadium: Omar Hamadi Stadium; Referee: Merzoug Brahimi

30 March 2018 Round 24	USM Bel-Abbès	0–1	NA Hussein Dey	Sidi Bel Abbès
16:00		Soccerway report Live TV: EPTV Terrestre / TV Tamazight 4	23' Khacef	Stadium: Stade 24 Fevrier 1956; Referee: Ahmed Bouzrar

7 April 2018 Round 25	DRB Tadjenanet	1–0	USM Bel-Abbès	Tadjenanet
16:00	Fourloul 21'	Soccerway report Live TV: TV Tamazight 4		Stadium: Lahoua Smaïl Stadium; Referee: Abderrezzak Arab

20 April 2018 Round 26	USM Bel-Abbès	0–1	JS Saoura	Sidi Bel Abbès
16:00		Soccerway report Live TV: EPTV Terrestre	85' (pen.) Yahia-Chérif	Stadium: Stade 24 Fevrier 1956; Referee: Farouk Mial

24 April 2018 Round 27	USM Bel-Abbès	1–0	USM El Harrach	Sidi Bel Abbès
16:00	Zouari 61'	Soccerway report Live TV: None		Stadium: Stade 24 Fevrier 1956; Referee: Lahlou Benbraham

27 April 2018 Round 28	MC Alger	1–2	USM Bel-Abbès	Bologhine
16:00	Derrardja 57'	Soccerway report Live TV: None	19' Metref; 59' Bouguettaya	Stadium: Omar Hamadi Stadium; Attendance: 0 (close doors); Referee: Ahmed Bouzrar

12 May 2018 Round 29	USM Bel-Abbès	0–0	US Biskra	Sidi Bel Abbès
16:00		Soccerway report Live TV: None		Stadium: Stade 24 Fevrier 1956; Referee: Redouane Necib

19 May 2018 Round 30	ES Sétif	0–0	USM Bel-Abbès	Sétif
16:00		Soccerway report Live TV: None		Stadium: Stade 8 Mai 1945; Referee: Hamza Boucetta

== Algerian Cup ==
29 December 2017 Round of 64	USM Bel-Abbès	0–0 (a.e.t.) (3–1 p)	HB Chelghoum Laïd	Sidi Bel Abbès
15:00				Stadium: Stade 24 Fevrier 1956; Referee: Hamza Bouslimani

13 January 2018 Round of 32	CRB Kaïs	0–2	USM Bel-Abbès	El Khroub
14:00			14' Zouari; 41' Bouguelmouna	Stadium: Abed Hamdani Stadium; Referee: Boubekeur Zouaoui

3 February 2018 Round of 16	USM Bel-Abbès	2–1	US Biskra	Sidi Bel Abbès
16:00	Khali 7'; Benabderahmane 71'	Live TV: EPTV Terrestre	47' El Hocine	Stadium: Stade 24 Fevrier 1956; Referee: Bahloul

3 March 2018 Quarter-finals	USM Bel-Abbès	2–1	JS Saoura	Sidi Bel Abbès
16:00	Seguer 61'; Belahouel 86'	Live TV: Algérie 3	28' Yahia-Chérif	Stadium: February 24, 1956 Stadium; Referee: Said Aouina

14 April 2018 Semi-finals	USM Bel Abbès	1–0	CR Zaouia	Sidi Bel Abbès
16:00	Tabti 90+3'	Live TV: Canal Algérie / Algérie 3		Stadium: 24 February Stadium; Referee: Redouane Necib

1 May 2017 Final	JS Kabylie	1–2	USM Bel Abbès	Algiers
16:00	Djerrar 56'		Belahouel 2', 49'	Stadium: Stade 5 Juillet 1962; Referee: Mehdi Abid Charef

== Squad information ==
=== Playing statistics ===
No.	Pos	Nat	Player	Total		Ligue 1		Algerian Cup	
No.	Pos	Nat	Player	Apps	Goals	Apps	Goals	Apps	Goals
Goalkeepers
1	GK	(Algeria) ALG	Nadjib Ghoul	15	0	15	0	0	0
16	GK	(Algeria) ALG	Athmane Toual	19	0	14	0	5	0
30	GK	(Algeria) ALG	Abdelkader Zarat Belmokhtar	2	0	1	0	1	0
Defenders
	DF	(Algeria) ALG	Anes Abbas	2	0	1	0	1	0
20	DF	(Algeria) ALG	Abderrahim Abdelli	19	1	14	1	5	0
25	DF	(Algeria) ALG	Farès Benabderahmane	30	1	24	0	6	1
22	DF	(Algeria) ALG	Sofiane Bengoureïne	4	0	4	0	0	0
	DF	(Algeria) ALG	Lakhdar Benketaf	1	0	1	0	0	0
19	DF	(Algeria) ALG	Zakaria Khali	32	3	27	2	5	1
15	DF	(Algeria) ALG	Nabil Lamara	32	0	26	0	6	0
4	DF	(Algeria) ALG	Nour El Islam Salah	8	0	5	0	3	0
2	DF	(Algeria) ALG	Samir Zerrouki	23	0	20	0	3	0
Midfielders
10	MF	(Algeria) ALG	Abdessamed Bounoua	31	2	26	2	5	0
	MF	(Algeria) ALG	Sid Ahmed El Mahi	2	0	1	0	1	0
12	MF	(Algeria) ALG	Malek Ferhat	3	0	3	0	0	0
29	MF	(Algeria) ALG	Yahia Labani	12	0	10	0	2	0
6	MF	(Algeria) ALG	Mohamed Lagraâ	31	0	25	0	6	0
	MF	(Algeria) ALG	Mouloud Nabil Metref	11	1	9	1	2	0
5	MF	(Algeria) ALG	Larbi Tabti	26	3	22	2	4	1
27	MF	(Algeria) ALG	Abdelkrim Zouari	33	6	27	5	6	1
Forwards
	FW	(Algeria) ALG	Adel Amarouche	1	0	1	0	0	0
7	FW	(Algeria) ALG	Abdennour Belhocini	24	6	21	6	3	0
8	FW	(Algeria) ALG	Hamza Belahouel	27	5	21	2	6	3
	FW	(Algeria) ALG	Dhira El Habib Bouchentouf	2	0	2	0	0	0
14	FW	(Algeria) ALG	Habib Bouguelmouna	29	6	24	5	5	1
	FW	(Algeria) ALG	Ameur Bouguettaya	14	1	11	1	3	0
	FW	(Algeria) ALG	Billel Mebarki	10	1	8	1	2	0
	FW	(Algeria) ALG	Djamel Chettal	5	0	5	0	0	0
21	FW	(Algeria) ALG	Mohamed Seguer	10	3	8	2	2	1
Players transferred out during the season
	DF	(Algeria) ALG	Walid Boubekeur Senigra	4	0	4	0	0	0
	MF	(Algeria) ALG	Mohamed Ismail Kherbache	7	1	7	1	0	0
	FW	(Algeria) ALG	Abderrahim Mamache	11	0	10	0	1	0
	FW	(Algeria) ALG	Walid Sbia	4	0	4	0	0	0

Last updated: 11 June 2018

=== Goalscorers ===
Includes all competitive matches. The list is sorted alphabetically by surname when total goals are equal.

No.	Nat.	Player	Pos.	L 1	AC	TOTAL
7	(Algeria)	Abdennour Belhocini	FW	6	0	6
14	(Algeria)	Habib Bouguelmouna	FW	5	1	6
27	(Algeria)	Abdelkrim Zouari	MF	5	1	6
8	(Algeria)	Hamza Belahouel	FW	2	3	5
19	(Algeria)	Zakaria Khali	DF	2	1	3
5	(Algeria)	Larbi Tabti	MF	2	1	3
21	(Algeria)	Mohamed Seguer	FW	2	1	3
10	(Algeria)	Abdessamed Bounoua	MF	2	0	2
20	(Algeria)	Abderrahim Abdelli	DF	1	0	1
25	(Algeria)	Farès Benabderahmane	DF	0	1	1
	(Algeria)	Mouloud Nabil Metref	MF	1	0	1
11	(Algeria)	Mohamed Ismail Kherbache	MF	1	0	1
	(Algeria)	Ameur Bouguettaya	FW	1	0	1
	(Algeria)	Billel Mebarki	FW	1	0	1
Own Goals				0	0	0
Totals				32	9	41

== Transfers ==
=== In ===
Date	Pos	Player	From club	Transfer fee	Source
15 July 2017	GK	(Algeria) Malek Ferhat	MO Béjaïa	Free transfer	
13 January 2018	FW	(Algeria) Mohamed Seguer	MC Alger	Free transfer (Released)	
13 January 2018	MF	(Algeria) Yahia Labani	US Biskra	Free transfer	
13 January 2018	MF	(Algeria) Billel Mebarki	USM El Harrach	Free transfer	
13 January 2018	DF	(Algeria) Nour El Islam Salah	Unattached	Free transfer	

=== Out ===
Date	Pos	Player	To club	Transfer fee	Source
22 June 2017	DF	(Algeria) Redouane Cherifi	USM Alger	Free transfer	
4 July 2017	MF	(Algeria) Amine El Amalli	MC Oran	Free transfer	
8 July 2017	MF	(Algeria) Ilyes Sidhoum	ES Sétif	Free transfer	
13 July 2017	RB	(Algeria) Ahmida Zenasni	CR Belouizdad	Free transfer	
13 July 2017	MF	(Algeria) Yahia Labani	CR Belouizdad	Free transfer	
13 July 2017	FW	(Algeria) Abou Sofiane Balegh	MC Alger	Free transfer	
