= 2016–17 USM Bel-Abbès season =

USM Bel Abbès
2016–17 season
- Chairman: Yahia Amroun
- Head coach: Tahar Chérif El-Ouazzani (from 2 June 2016)
- Stadium: Stade 24 Fevrier 1956
- Ligue 1: 4th
- Algerian Cup: Semi-finals
- Top goalscorer: League: Abou Sofiane Balegh (10); All: Abou Sofiane Balegh (14)

In the 2016–17 season, USM Bel Abbès competed in the Ligue 1 for the 22nd season, as well as the Algerian Cup.

== Squad list ==
Players and squad numbers last updated on 20 August 2016.
Note: Flags indicate national team as has been defined under FIFA eligibility rules. Players may hold more than one non-FIFA nationality.

No.	Nat.	Position	Name	Date of birth (age)	Signed from
Goalkeepers
1	(Algeria)	GK	Nadjib Ghoul	12 September 1985 (aged 30)	(Algeria) CS Constantine
16	(Algeria)	GK	Athmane Toual	17 July 1984 (aged 32)	(Algeria) ESM Koléa
Defenders
13	(Algeria)	CB	Redouane Bachiri	27 October 1982 (aged 33)	(Algeria) MC Alger
25	(Algeria)	CB	Farès Benabderahmane	11 August 1987 (aged 29)	(Algeria) RC Relizane
8	(Algeria)	RB	Billel Benaldjia	23 August 1988 (aged 27)	(Algeria) DRB Tadjenanet
22	(Algeria)	LB	Sofiane Bengoureïne	10 October 1984 (aged 31)	(Algeria) USM Annaba
24	(Algeria)	LB	Redouane Cherifi	22 February 1993 (aged 23)	(Algeria) CA Batna
19	(Algeria)	CB	Zakaria Khali	10 May 1990 (aged 26)	(Algeria) Youth system
15	(Algeria)	RB	Mohamed Yaghni	22 February 1988 (aged 28)	(Algeria) USMM Hadjout
28	(Algeria)	RB	Ahmida Zenasni	10 July 1993 (aged 23)	(Algeria) WA Tlemcen
Midfielders
6	(Algeria)	DM	Ilyes Sidhoum	10 August 1989 (aged 27)	(Algeria) CR Belouizdad
7	(Algeria)		Abou Sofiane Balegh	17 August 1988 (aged 28)	(Algeria) CR Belouizdad
10	(Algeria)	DM	Abdessamed Bounoua	24 April 1991 (aged 25)	(Algeria) Youth system
18	(Algeria)		Djamel Chettal	23 May 1992 (aged 24)	(Algeria) DRB Tadjenanet
26	(Algeria)		Amine Lamali	29 April 1988 (aged 28)	(Algeria) MC El Eulma
11	(Algeria)	AM	Bilel Herbache	4 January 1986 (aged 30)	(Algeria) JS Kabylie
5	(Algeria)	AM	Larbi Tabti	23 April 1993 (aged 23)	(Algeria) ASM Oran
27	(Algeria)	RW	Abdelkrim Zouari	14 July 1989 (aged 27)	(Algeria) MC Saïda
20	(Algeria)	DM	Yahia Labani	16 August 1991 (aged 25)	(Algeria) USMM Hadjout
Forwards
31	(Algeria)		Abdennour Belhocini	18 August 1996 (aged 20)	(Algeria) Youth system
14	(Algeria)		Habib Bouguelmouna	12 December 1988 (aged 27)	(Algeria) CA Bordj Bou Arréridj
9	(Algeria)		Ilyes Kourbia	9 November 1992 (aged 23)	(Algeria) ES Sétif

== Competitions ==
=== Overview ===
Competition	Record								Started round	Final position / round	First match	Last match
Competition	G	W	D	L	GF	GA	GD	Win %	Started round	Final position / round	First match	Last match
Ligue 1	30	14	6	10	37	33	+4	46.67	—N/a	4th	20 August 2016	14 June 2017
Algerian Cup	5	3	2	0	8	1	+7	60.00	Round of 64	Semi-finals	26 November 2016	20 June 2017
Total	35	17	8	10	45	34	+11	48.57				

== League table ==
Pos	Team	Pld	W	D	L	GF	GA	GD	Pts	Qualification or relegation
2	MC Alger	30	14	8	8	38	27	+11	50 (Note: MC Alger ahead of USM Alger on head-to-head record: MCA–UAL 2–1, UAL–MCA 2–2.)	Qualification for the 2018 CAF Champions League
3	USM Alger	30	14	8	8	50	31	+19	50	Qualification for the 2018 CAF Confederation Cup
4	USM Bel-Abbès	30	14	6	10	37	33	+4	48	
5	JS Saoura	30	12	9	9	34	30	+4	45	
6	CR Belouizdad	30	12	7	11	30	25	+5	43	Qualification for the 2018 CAF Confederation Cup

Updated to match(es) played on 14 June 2017. Source: DZFoot
Rules for classification: 1) points; 2) head-to-head points; 3) head-to-head goal difference; 4) goal difference; 5) total goals; 6) fairplay ranking; 7) playoff.

=== Results summary ===
Overall								Home						Away					
Pld	W	D	L	GF	GA	GD	Pts	W	D	L	GF	GA	GD	W	D	L	GF	GA	GD
30	14	6	10	37	33	+4	48	11	4	0	27	9	+18	3	2	10	10	24	−14

Last updated: 30 January 2016.
Source: Competitive matches

=== Results by round ===
Round	1	2	3	4	5	6	7	8	9	10	11	12	13	14	15	16	17	18	19	20	21	22	23	24	25	26	27	28	29	30
Ground																														
Result	D	L	D	L	W	L	D	W	W	L	W	L	W	W	L	W	W	W	W	L	W	L	D	D	W	D	W	L	L	W
Position	9	14	13	14	11	13	14	10	7	9	6	8	6	6	8	8	6	3	2	3	2	3	3	4	3	4	3	4	5	4

Updated to match(es) played on 30 January 2016. Source: Competitive matches
A = Away; H = Home; W = Win; D = Draw; L = Loss

=== Matches ===
Win Draw Loss

20 August 2016 Round 1	USM Bel Abbès	0–0	USM El Harrach	Sidi Bel Abbès
19:00		Soccerway report Live TV: None		Stadium: Stade 24 Fevrier 1956; Referee: Ahmed Bouzrar

27 August 2016 Round 2	CA Batna	1–0	USM Bel Abbès	Batna
17:00	Attouche 90+1'	Report; Live TV: None		Stadium: Stade Seffouhi; Referee: Merzak Halalchi

10 September 2016 Round 3	USM Bel Abbès	2–2	NA Hussein Dey	Sidi Bel Abbès
19:00	Ali Amiri 20'; Balegh 79'	Report; Live TV: None	40' (pen.) Bendebka; 53' Mokhtari	Stadium: Stade 24 Fevrier 1956; Referee: Mehdi Abid Charef

16 September 2016 Round 4	MC Oran	1–0	USM Bel Abbès	Oran
17:45	Chérif 66'	Report; Live TV: EPTV Terrestre / Canal Algérie		Stadium: Stade Ahmed Zabana; Referee: Abderrezzak Arab

24 September 2016 Round 5	USM Bel Abbès	2–1	ES Sétif	Sidi Bel Abbès
19:00	Khali 56'; Balegh 58'	Report; Live TV: None	69' Djahnit	Stadium: Stade 24 Fevrier 1956; Referee: Hamza Bouslimani

1 October 2016 Round 6	CS Constantine	3–1	USM Bel Abbès	Constantine
17:00	Aoudia 7'; Meghni 69' (pen.); Belkheir 90+2'	Report; Live TV: None	8' Korbiaa	Stadium: Stade Mohamed Hamlaoui; Referee: Lotfi Bekouassa

15 October 2016 Round 7	USM Bel Abbès	1–1	JS Saoura	Sidi Bel Abbès
17:00	Korbiaa 20'	Report; Live TV: Canal Algérie	90' Bencharif	Stadium: Stade 24 Fevrier 1956; Referee: Rafik Achouri

21 October 2016 Round 8	CR Belouizdad	0–1	USM Bel Abbès	Belouizdad
16:00		Report; Live TV: Algérie 3 / TV Tamazight 4	87' Tabti	Stadium: Stade 20 Août 1955; Referee: Ahmed Bouzrar

29 October 2016 Round 9	USM Bel Abbès	3–1	DRB Tadjenanet	Sidi Bel Abbès
16:00	Balegh 34', 45'; El Amali 47'	Report; Live TV: Algérie 3	31' (pen.) El Moudene	Stadium: Stade 24 Fevrier 1956; Referee: Lotfi Bekouassa

4 November 2016 Round 10	RC Relizane	2–0	USM Bel Abbès	Relizane
16:00	Tebbi 45'; Belmokhtar 80'	Report; Live TV: EPTV Terrestre / Canal Algérie		Stadium: Stade Tahar Zoughari; Referee: Mohamed Boukhalfa

12 November 2016 Round 11	USM Bel Abbès	2–1	MO Béjaïa	Sidi Bel Abbès
14:30	Bouguelmouna 16', 26'	Report; Live TV: None	63' Messadia	Stadium: Stade 24 Fevrier 1956; Referee: Rafik Achouri

19 November 2016 Round 12	Olympique de Médéa	1–0	USM Bel Abbès	Médéa
15:00	Bouchiba 34'	Report; Live TV: None		Stadium: Stade Imam Lyes de Médéa; Referee: Abderrezzak Arab

1 December 2016 Round 13	USM Bel Abbès	2–1	USM Alger	Sidi Bel Abbès
16:00	Balegh 7'; Kourbia 33'	Report; Live TV: TV Tamazight 4 / Canal Algérie	90' Carolus	Stadium: Stade 24 Fevrier 1956; Referee: Ahmed Bouzrar

10 December 2016 Round 14	USM Bel Abbès	2–0	JS Kabylie	Sidi Bel Abbès
16:00	Benabderahmane 60'; Balegh 78'	Report; Live TV: TV Tamazight 4		Stadium: Stade 24 Fevrier 1956; Referee: Lotfi Bekouassa

22 December 2016 Round 15	MC Alger	3–1	USM Bel Abbès	Bologhine
17:00	Hachoud 28'; Nekkache 33'; Bouguèche 50'	Report; Live TV: TV Tamazight 4 / Canal Algérie	84' Bouguelmouna	Stadium: Omar Hamadi Stadium; Referee: Mehdi Abid Charef

21 January 2017 Round 16	USM El Harrach	0–2	USM Bel Abbès	El Harrach
15:00		Report; Live TV: None	49' Zouari; 54' Bouguelmouna	Stadium: November 1, 1954 Stadium; Referee: Abderrezzak Arab

28 January 2017 Round 17	USM Bel Abbès	2–0	CA Batna	Sidi Bel Abbès
16:00	Bouguelmouna 10', 35'	Report; Live TV: Canal Algérie		Stadium: Stade 24 Fevrier 1956; Referee: Lotfi Bekouassa

3 February 2017 Round 18	NA Hussein Dey	1–2	USM Bel Abbès	Mohamed Belouizdad
16:00	Gasmi 24' (pen.)	Report; Live TV: EPTV Terrestre / Canal Algérie	5' Balegh; 41' Benabderahmane	Stadium: August 20, 1955 Stadium; Referee: Lahlou Benbraham

9 February 2017 Round 19	USM Bel Abbès	2–0	MC Oran	Sidi Bel Abbès
16:00	Zouari 45'; Balegh 58'	Report; Live TV: None		Stadium: Stade 24 Fevrier 1956; Referee: Merzak Halalchi

18 February 2017 Round 20	ES Sétif	1–0	USM Bel Abbès	Sétif
16:00	Nadji 69'	Report; Live TV: Algérie 3 / Canal Algérie		Stadium: Stade 8 Mai 1945; Referee: Said Aouina

24 February 2017 Round 21	USM Bel Abbès	1–0	CS Constantine	Sidi Bel Abbès
16:00	Boucheriha 80' (o.g.)	Report; Live TV: EPTV Terrestre / Algérie 3		Stadium: Stade 24 Fevrier 1956; Referee: Lotfi Bekouassa

4 March 2017 Round 22	JS Saoura	3–0	USM Bel Abbès	Béchar
18:00	Djallit 24', 39'; Hamia 86'	Report; Live TV: None		Stadium: August 20, 1955 Stadium; Referee: Marzouk Brahimi

11 March 2017 Round 23	USM Bel Abbès	0–0	CR Belouizdad	Sidi Bel Abbès
16:00		Report; Live TV: TV Tamazight 4 / Algérie 3		Stadium: Stade 24 Fevrier 1956; Referee: Rafik Achouri

18 March 2017 Round 24	DRB Tadjenanet	0–0	USM Bel Abbès	Tadjenanet
16:00		Report; Live TV: None		Stadium: Lahoua Smaïl Stadium; Referee: Ahmed Bouzrar

6 May 2017 Round 25	USM Bel Abbès	2–0	RC Relizane	Sidi Bel Abbès
16:00	Balegh 22' (pen.); Tabti 74'	Report; Live TV: None		Stadium: Stade 24 Fevrier 1956; Referee: Lyés Boukouassa

12 May 2017 Round 26	MO Béjaïa	1–1	USM Bel Abbès	Béjaïa
16:00	Belkacemi 45'	Report; Live TV: None	52' Korbiaa	Stadium: Maghrebi Unity Stadium; Referee: Yazid Ibrir

20 May 2017 Round 27	USM Bel Abbès	3–0	Olympique de Médéa	Sidi Bel Abbès
17:30	Bouguelmouna 58'; Chettal 71'; Zouari 90+3'	Report; Live TV: None		Stadium: Stade 24 Fevrier 1956; Referee: Lotfi Bekouassa

7 June 2017 Round 28	USM Alger	6–2	USM Bel Abbès	Bologhine
22:00	Darfalou 9'; Meftah 29'; Meziane 45+1'; Bourenane 58'; Koudri 65'; Beldjilali 77'	Report; Live TV: TV Tamazight 4	22' Zouari; 90+2' (pen.) Bounoua	Stadium: Omar Hamadi Stadium; Referee: Rafik Achouri

10 June 2017 Round 29	JS Kabylie	1–0	USM Bel Abbès	Tizi Ouzou
17:00	Mesbahi 36'	Report; Live TV: TV Tamazight 4		Stadium: November 1, 1954 Stadium; Referee: Lotfi Bekouassa

14 June 2017 Round 30	USM Bel Abbès	3–2	MC Alger	Sidi Bel Abbès
22:30	Tabti 11'; Balegh 14'; Bouguelmouna 15'	Report; Live TV: None	35' Nekkache; 77' Derrardja	Stadium: Stade 24 Fevrier 1956; Referee: Ahmed Bouzrar

== Algerian Cup ==
25 November 2016 Round of 64	RC Kouba	1–2 (a.e.t.)	USM Bel Abbès	Belouizdad
16:00	Kedjour 58'	Live TV: EPTV Terrestre / TV Tamazight 4	Balegh 41', 116'	Stadium: Stade du 20 Août 1955; Referee: Mehdi Abid Charef

17 December 2016 Round of 32	USM Bel Abbès	2–0	RC Relizane	Sidi Bel Abbès
16:00	Balegh 42'; Lamali 76'	Live TV: Canal Algérie		Stadium: Stade 24 Fevrier 1956; Referee: Lahlou Benbraham

27 December 2016 Round of 16	USM Bel Abbès	0–0 (a.e.t.) (5–4 p)	USM Alger	Sidi Bel Abbès
17:00		Live TV: EPTV Terrestre		Stadium: Stade 24 Fevrier 1956; Referee: Brahimi, Semsoum, Chaballah
	Penalties
	Sidhoum (penalty missed); Benabderahmane (penalty scored); Belhocini (penalty missed); Cherifi (penalty scored); Balegh (penalty scored); Kourbia (penalty scored); Bounoua (penalty scored)		(penalty scored) Benyahia; (penalty missed) Sayoud; (penalty missed) Benguit; (penalty scored) Benmoussa; (penalty scored) Meziane; (penalty scored) Abdellaoui; (penalty missed) Beldjilali

1 April 2017 Quarter-finals	USM Bel Abbès	4–0	NA Hussein Dey	Sidi Bel Abbès
16:00	Balegh 72'; Zouari 76'; Bouguelmouna 79', 84'	Live TV: Algérie 3		Stadium: Stade 24 Fevrier 1956; Referee: Said Aouina

20 June 2017 Semi-finals	CR Belouizdad	0–0 (a.e.t.) (6–5 p)	USM Bel Abbès	Belouizdad
22:30		Live TV: Canal Algérie / TV Tamazight 4 / Al-Kass Sports		Stadium: Stade du 20 Août 1955; Referee: Said Aouina
	Penalties
	Feham (penalty scored); Aribi (penalty scored); Lakroum (penalty scored); Lamhene (penalty scored); Namani (penalty scored); Bellaili (penalty missed); Heriat (penalty scored)		(penalty scored) Benabderahmane; (penalty scored) Labani; (penalty scored) Tabti; (penalty scored) Lamali; (penalty scored) Zouari; (penalty missed) ? (penalty missed) ?

== Squad information ==
=== Playing statistics ===
No.	Pos	Nat	Player	Total		Ligue 1		Algerian Cup	
No.	Pos	Nat	Player	Apps	Goals	Apps	Goals	Apps	Goals
Goalkeepers
1	GK	(Algeria) ALG	Nadjib Ghoul	13	0	12	0	1	0
16	GK	(Algeria) ALG	Athmane Toual	20	0	17	0	3	0
	GK	(Algeria) ALG	Abdelkader Zarat Belmokretar	1	0	0	0	1	0
Defenders
13	DF	(Algeria) ALG	Redouane Bachiri	25	0	21	0	4	0
25	DF	(Algeria) ALG	Farès Benabderahmane	25	2	20	2	5	0
8	DF	(Algeria) ALG	Billel Benaldjia	1	0	1	0	0	0
22	DF	(Algeria) ALG	Sofiane Bengoureïne	5	0	4	0	1	0
24	DF	(Algeria) ALG	Redouane Cherifi	31	0	27	0	4	0
19	DF	(Algeria) ALG	Zakaria Khali	34	1	29	1	5	0
6	DF	(Algeria) ALG	Ilyes Sidhoum	29	0	25	0	4	0
15	DF	(Algeria) ALG	Mohamed Yaghni	21	0	17	0	4	0
	DF	(Algeria) ALG	Abderrahim Abdelli	2	0	2	0	0	0
Midfielders
7	MF	(Algeria) ALG	Abou Sofiane Balegh	32	14	27	10	5	4
10	MF	(Algeria) ALG	Abdessamed Bounoua	33	1	28	1	5	0
18	MF	(Algeria) ALG	Djamel Chettal	10	1	10	1	0	0
26	MF	(Algeria) ALG	Amine El Amali	21	2	16	1	5	1
11	MF	(Algeria) ALG	Bilel Herbache	7	0	7	0	0	0
	MF	(Algeria) ALG	Mouloud Nabil Metref	2	0	2	0	0	0
5	MF	(Algeria) ALG	Larbi Tabti	31	3	28	3	3	0
28	MF	(Algeria) ALG	Ahmida Zenasni	16	0	15	0	1	0
27	MF	(Algeria) ALG	Abdelkrim Zouari	14	6	12	4	2	2
Forwards
	FW	(Algeria) ALG	Abdennour Belhocini	8	0	6	0	2	0
14	FW	(Algeria) ALG	Habib Bouguelmouna	24	9	21	8	3	1
	FW	(Algeria) ALG	Sid Ahmed El Mahi	2	0	1	0	1	0
9	FW	(Algeria) ALG	Ilyes Kourbia	24	4	20	4	4	0
20	FW	(Algeria) ALG	Yahia Labani	24	0	20	0	4	0
Players transferred out during the season
	GK	(Algeria) ALG	Oussama Benbot	1	0	1	0	0	0
	MF	(Algeria) ALG	Karim Hendou	10	0	9	0	1	0
	MF	(Algeria) ALG	Ali Amiri	9	0	8	0	1	0
	FW	(Algeria) ALG	Youcef Ghazali	11	1	10	1	1	0

Last updated: 11 June 2018

=== Goalscorers ===
Includes all competitive matches. The list is sorted alphabetically by surname when total goals are equal.

No.	Nat.	Player	Pos.	L 1	AC	TOTAL
7	(Algeria)	Abou Sofiane Balegh	MF	10	4	14
14	(Algeria)	Habib Bouguelmouna	FW	8	2	10
27	(Algeria)	Abdelkrim Zouari	MF	4	1	5
9	(Algeria)	Ilyes Kourbia	FW	4	0	4
5	(Algeria)	Larbi Tabti	MF	3	0	3
25	(Algeria)	Farès Benabderahmane	DF	2	0	2
26	(Algeria)	Amine Lamali	MF	1	1	2
10	(Algeria)	Abdessamed Bounoua	MF	1	0	1
18	(Algeria)	Djamel Chettal	MF	1	0	1
19	(Algeria)	Zakaria Khali	DF	1	0	1
Own Goals				1	0	1
Totals				37	8	45

== Transfers ==
=== In ===
Date	Pos	Player	From club	Transfer fee	Source
1 July 2016	DF	(Algeria) Farès Benabderahmane	RC Relizane	Undisclosed	
1 July 2016	DF	(Algeria) Redouane Bachiri	MC Alger	Free transfer	
3 July 2016	FW	(Algeria) Habib Bouguelmouna	CA Bordj Bou Arreridj	Free transfer	
30 December 2016	MF	(Algeria) Bilel Herbache	JS Kabylie	Free transfer	
8 January 2017	GK	(Algeria) Nadjib Ghoul	CS Constantine	Free transfer	
14 January 2017	DF	(Algeria) Billel Benaldjia	DRB Tadjenanet	Undisclosed	
14 January 2017	MF	(Algeria) Djamel Chettal	DRB Tadjenanet	Undisclosed	
15 January 2017	MF	(Algeria) Abdelkrim Zouari	MC Saïda	Free transfer	
