= 2018 Algerian Cup final =

- Stade du 5 Juillet hosted the match
- Event: 2017–18 Algerian Cup
| JS Kabylie | USM Bel Abbès |
| 1 | 2 |
- Date: May 1, 2018
- Venue: Stade 5 Juillet 1962, Algiers
- Referee: Mehdi Abid Charef
- Attendance: 55.000

The 2018 Algerian Cup final was the 54th final of the Algerian Cup. The final took place on May 1, 2018, at Stade 5 Juillet 1962 in Algiers with kick-off at 16:00.

== Route to the final ==
JS Kabylie

| Round of 64 | JS Kabylie | 1–0 | ES Ben Aknoun |
| Round of 32 | JS Kabylie | 2–0 | RCB Oued Rhiou |
| Round of 16 | CRB Dar El Beïda | 0–1 | JS Kabylie |
| Quarter-finals | JS Kabylie | 2–1 | USM Blida |
| Semifinals | JS Kabylie | 0–0; 6 – 5 (pen.) | MC Alger |

USM Bel Abbès

| Round of 64 | USM Bel Abbès | 0–0; 3 – 1 (pen.) | HB Chelghoum Laïd |
| Round of 32 | CRB Kaïs | 0–2 | USM Bel Abbès |
| Round of 16 | USM Bel Abbès | 2–1 | US Biskra |
| Quarter-finals | USM Bel Abbès | 2–1 | JS Saoura |
| Semifinals | USM Bel Abbès | 1–0 | CR Zaouia |

== Pre-match ==
=== Details ===
May 1, 2017
16:00

| JS Kabylie | 1–2 | USM Bel Abbès |
|---|---|---|
| Djerrar 56' | Report | Belahouel 2', 49' |

Stade 5 Juillet 1962, Algiers
Attendance: 55,000
Referee: Mehdi Abid Charef

| GK | 30 | (Algeria) Malik Asselah | (red card) 72' |
| DF | 5 | (Algeria) Nabil Saâdou |
| DF | 4 | (Algeria) Essaid Belkalem |
| DF | 2 | (Algeria) Saâdi Radouani | (yellow card) 67' |
| MF | 6 | (Algeria) Lyes Benyoucef | (yellow card) 45+1' | (substituted off) 70' |
| MF | 19 | (Algeria) Adel Djerrar | | (substituted off) 74' |
| MF | 15 | (Algeria) Ilyes Chetti | (yellow card) 83' |
| MF | 7 | (Algeria) Mehdi Benaldjia |
| MF | 21 | (Algeria) Malik Raiah (c) | (yellow card) 22' | (substituted off) 70' |
| MF | 23 | (Algeria) Nassim Yettou |
| FW | 10 | (Algeria) Adil Djabout |
Substitutes :
| GK | 16 | (Algeria) Abderrahmane Boultif | | (substituted on) 74' |
| MF | 17 | (Algeria) Salim Boukhenchouche | | (substituted on) 70' |
| MF | 11 | (Algeria) Ziri Hammar | | (substituted on) 70' |
| MF | 22 | (Algeria) Mohamed Guemroud |
| MF | 27 | (Algeria) Juba Oukaci |
| DF | 29 | (Algeria) Ali Guitoune |
| MF | 9 | (Algeria) Nazim Si Salem |
Manager :
(Algeria) Youssef Bouzidi

| GK | 16 | (Algeria) Athmane Toual |
| DF | 15 | (Algeria) Nabil Lamara |
| DF | 19 | (Algeria) Zakaria Khali |
| DF | 25 | (Algeria) Farès Benabderahmane (c) |
| DF | 20 | (Algeria) Abderrahim Abdelli |
| MF | 6 | (Algeria) Mohamed Lagraâ |
| FW | 8 | (Algeria) Hamza Belahouel | | (substituted off) 85' |
| MF | 5 | (Algeria) Larbi Tabti | | (substituted off) 90+2' |
| MF | 10 | (Algeria) Abdessamed Bounoua |
| FW | 14 | (Algeria) Habib Bouguelmouna | | (substituted off) 67' |
| FW | 27 | (Algeria) Abdelkrim Zouari | (yellow card) 7' |
Substitutes :
| GK | 1 | (Algeria) Nadjib Ghoul |
| DF | 2 | (Algeria) Samir Zerrouki |
| DF | 22 | (Algeria) Sofiane Bengoureïne |
| DF | 4 | (Algeria) Nour El Islam Salah | | (substituted on) 90+2' |
| MF | 29 | (Algeria) Yahia Labani | | (substituted on) 85' |
| MF | 7 | (Algeria) Abdennour Iheb Belhocini | | (substituted on) 67' |
| FW | 21 | (Algeria) Mohamed Seguer |
Manager :
(Algeria) Tahar Chérif El-Ouazzani

MATCH OFFICIALS

- Assistant referees:
  - Abdelhak Etchiali
  - Nabil Bounoua
- Fourth official:
  - Mohamed Saïdi

== Media coverage ==
2018 Algerian Cup Final Media Coverage
| Country | Television Channel |
|---|---|
| Algeria | EPTV Channels |
| Iraq | Iraqia Sports |
| Jordan | Jordan Sports |
| Oman | Oman Sports |
| Qatar | beIN Sports |
| Qatar | Al-Kass Sports |
| United Arab Emirates | AD Sports |
| United Arab Emirates | Dubai Sports |
