= 2018–19 USM Bel Abbès season =

USM Bel-Abbès
2018–19 season
- Chairman: Okacha Hasnaoui
- Head coach: Moez Bouakaz (from 30 May 2018) (until 21 October 2018); Youcef Bouzidi (from 23 October 2018); Sid Ahmed Slimani (from 5 April 2019)
- Stadium: Stade 24 Fevrier 1956
- Ligue 1: 13th
- Algerian Cup: Round of 32
- Super Cup: Winners
- Confederation Cup: First round
- Top goalscorer: League: Mourad Benayad (5); All: Mohamed Seguer (6)

In the 2018–19 season, USM Bel-Abbès competed in the Ligue 1 for the 24th season, as well as the Confederation Cup, and the Algerian Cup.

== Competitions ==
=== Overview ===
Competition	Record								Started round	Final position / round	First match	Last match
Competition	G	W	D	L	GF	GA	GD	Win %	Started round	Final position / round	First match	Last match
Ligue 1	30	9	8	13	24	39	−15	30.00	—N/a	13th	11 August 2018	26 May 2019
Algerian Cup	2	1	0	1	3	2	+1	50.00	Round of 64	Round of 32	27 December 2018	31 December 2018
Super Cup	1	1	0	0	1	0	+1	100.00	Final	Winners	1 November 2018	
Confederation Cup	4	1	1	2	4	3	+1	25.00	Preliminary round	First round	27 November 2018	23 December 2018
Total	37	12	9	16	32	44	−12	32.43				

Updated to match played 28 May 2018
Source: Competitions

== League table ==
Pos	Team	Pld	W	D	L	GF	GA	GD	Pts	Qualification or relegation
11	NA Hussein Dey	30	9	9	12	22	29	−7	36 (Note: Head-to-head: MC Oran 7 points; NA Hussein Dey 5 points; AS Aïn M'lila 3 points.)	
12	AS Aïn M'lila	30	7	15	8	20	30	−10	36	
13	USM Bel Abbès	30	9	8	13	24	39	−15	35	
14	MO Béjaïa (R)	30	7	12	11	23	36	−13	33	Relegation to Ligue 2
15	DRB Tadjenanet (R)	30	7	10	13	26	38	−12	31 (Note: Head-to-head: DRB Tadjenanet 4 points; Olympique de Médéa 1 point.)	Relegation to Ligue 2

Source: DZFoot
Rules for classification: 1) points; 2) head-to-head points; 3) head-to-head goal difference; 4) goal difference; 5) total goals; 6) fairplay ranking; 7) playoff.
(R) Relegated

=== Results summary ===
Overall								Home						Away					
Pld	W	D	L	GF	GA	GD	Pts	W	D	L	GF	GA	GD	W	D	L	GF	GA	GD
30	9	8	13	24	38	−14	35	7	5	3	17	14	+3	2	3	10	7	24	−17

Last updated: 28 May 2018.
Source: Competitive matches

=== Results by round ===
Round	1	2	3	4	5	6	7	8	9	10	11	12	13	14	15	16	17	18	19	20	21	22	23	24	25	26	27	28	29	30
Ground	A	H	A	H	A	H	A	H	A	H	A	A	H	A	H	H	A	H	A	H	A	H	A	H	A	A	H	A	H	A
Result	L	L	L	W	L	D	D	D	L	D	D	L	D	W	W	W	L	L	D	L	L	D	L	W	L	W	W	W	W	L
Position	15	15	15	13	15	15	15	15	15	15	15	15	15	14	14	14	13	15	14	15	16	16	16	16	16	16	13	13	11	13

Updated to match(es) played on 16 May 2019. Source: Competitive matches
A = Away; H = Home; W = Win; D = Draw; L = Loss

=== Matches ===
Win Draw Loss

11 August 2018 Round 1	ES Sétif	3–0	USM Bel Abbès	Sétif
20:00	Rebiai 29'; Ghacha 48'; Djabou 57'	Soccerway report		Stadium: Stade 8 Mai 1945; Referee: Redouane Necib

17 August 2018 Round 2	USM Bel Abbès	1–2	Olympique de Médéa	Sidi Bel Abbès
17:45	Khali 10'	Soccerway report	Chekhrit 12', 32'	Stadium: Stade 24 Fevrier 1956; Referee: Lahlou Benbraham

28 August 2018 Round 3	JS Kabylie	3–1	USM Bel Abbès	Tizi Ouzou
17:45	Benyoucef 45+3' (pen.); Abdul Razak 67', 90+3'	Soccerway report	Aït Fergane 43'	Stadium: November 1, 1954 Stadium; Referee: Rafik Achouri

1 September 2018 Round 4	USM Bel Abbès	3–1	MC Oran	Sidi Bel Abbès
17:45	Guebli 17'; Aït Fergane 25'; Zouari 60'	Soccerway report	Nadji 62'	Stadium: Stade 24 Fevrier 1956; Referee: Mehdi Abid Charef

10 September 2018 Round 5	CS Constantine	3–0	USM Bel Abbès	Constantine
19:00	Lamri 43', 68'; Abid 58'	Soccerway report		Stadium: Stade Mohamed Hamlaoui; Referee: Lotfi Bekouassa

22 September 2018 Round 7	NA Hussein Dey	0–0	USM Bel Abbès	Belouizdad
16:00		Soccerway report		Stadium: Stade 20 Août 1955; Referee: Ahmed Bouzrar

29 September 2018 Round 8	USM Bel Abbès	0–0	CA Bordj Bou Arreridj	Sidi Bel Abbès
17:45		Soccerway report		Stadium: Stade 24 Fevrier 1956; Referee: Amine Hansal

5 October 2018 Round 9	JS Saoura	3–0	USM Bel Abbès	Béchar
19:00	Farhi 5'; Djallit 50' (pen.); Bekakchi 90+3'	Soccerway report		Stadium: Stade 20 Août 1955; Referee: Lahlou Benbraham

9 October 2018 Round 10	USM Bel Abbès	2–2	MO Béjaïa	Sidi Bel Abbès
16:00	Bellahouel 14', 78'	Soccerway report	Touré 53', 68'	Stadium: Stade 24 Fevrier 1956; Referee: Rafik Achouri

19 October 2018 Round 6	USM Bel-Abbès	2–2	USM Alger	Sidi Bel Abbès
17:45	Bouda 75'; Benayad 77'	Soccerway report	Chita 42'; Ibara 70'	Stadium: Stade 24 Fevrier 1956; Referee: Ahmed Bouzrar

23 October 2018 Round 11	DRB Tadjenanet	0–0	USM Bel Abbès	Tadjenanet
17:30		Soccerway report		Stadium: Lahoua Smaïl Stadium; Referee: Amine Sekhraoui

6 November 2018 Round 13	USM Bel Abbès	1–1	Paradou AC	Sidi Bel Abbès
17:00	Tabti 20'	Soccerway report	Zorgane 64'	Stadium: Stade 24 Fevrier 1956; Referee: Rafik Achouri

13 November 2018 Round 14	MC Alger	0–1	USM Bel Abbès	Algiers
18:00		Soccerway report	Khali 43'	Stadium: July 5, 1962 Stadium; Referee: Lahlou Benbraham

17 November 2018 Round 12	AS Ain M'lila	1–0	USM Bel Abbès	Batna
16:00	Benyahia 64'	Soccerway report		Stadium: November 1, 1954 Stadium; Referee: Ahmed Bouzrar

22 November 2018 Round 15	USM Bel Abbès	1–0	CR Belouizdad	Sidi Bel Abbès
16:00	Tabti 7' (pen.)	Soccerway report		Stadium: Stade 24 Fevrier 1956; Referee: Redouane Necib

4 January 2019 Round 16	USM Bel Abbès	2–0	ES Sétif	Sidi Bel Abbès
16:00	Benayad 22', 45'	Soccerway report		Stadium: Stade 24 Fevrier 1956; Referee: Farouk Mial

11 January 2019 Round 17	Olympique de Médéa	2–0	USM Bel Abbès	Médéa
15:00	Sameur 25'; Belalem 75' (pen.)	Soccerway report		Stadium: Stade Imam Lyes de Médéa; Referee: Said Aouina

19 January 2019 Round 18	USM Bel Abbès	0–2	JS Kabylie	Sidi Bel Abbès
16:00		Soccerway report	Hamroune 44'; Belgherbi 68'	Stadium: Stade 24 Fevrier 1956; Referee: Redouane Necib

25 January 2019 Round 19	MC Oran	2–2	USM Bel Abbès	Oran
16:00	Boudebouda 40'; Mansouri 73' (pen.)	Soccerway report	Mesmoudi 13', 90+3'	Stadium: Ahmed Zabana Stadium; Referee: Lotfi Bekouassa

4 February 2019 Round 20	USM Bel Abbès	0–4	CS Constantine	Sidi Bel Abbès
16:00		Soccerway report	Bahamboula 24'; Lamri 45'; Belkacemi 58'; Beldjilali 61'	Stadium: Stade 24 Fevrier 1956; Referee: Lyés Bekouassa

9 February 2019 Round 21	USM Alger	1–0	USM Bel Abbès	Bologhine
18:00	Meziane 23'	Soccerway report Live TV: None		Stadium: Omar Hamadi Stadium; Referee: Farid Bahloul

2 March 2019 Round 23	CA Bordj Bou Arreridj	3–1	USM Bel Abbès	Bordj Bou Arréridj
18:00	Sebie 29'; Aggoun 35'; Athmani 47'	Soccerway report	Seguer 38'	Stadium: Stade 20 Août 1955; Referee: Merzoug Brahimi

1 April 2019 Round 25	MO Béjaïa	1–0	USM Bel Abbès	Béjaïa
18:00	Touré 59'	Soccerway report		Stadium: Stade de l'Unité Maghrébine; Referee: Amine Sekhraoui

10 April 2019 Round 22	USM Bel Abbès	0–0	NA Hussein Dey	Sidi Bel Abbès
16:00		Soccerway report		Stadium: Stade 24 Fevrier 1956; Referee: Abderrezzak Arab

21 April 2019 Round 26	USM Bel Abbès	1–0	DRB Tadjenanet	Sidi Bel Abbès
16:00	Seguer 19'	Soccerway report		Stadium: Stade 24 Fevrier 1956; Referee: Lyés Bekouassa

4 May 2019 Round 24	USM Bel Abbès	1–0	JS Saoura	Sidi Bel Abbès
16:00	Khali 10'	Soccerway report		Stadium: Stade 24 Fevrier 1956; Referee: Hamza Bouslimani

11 May 2019 Round 27	USM Bel Abbès	1–0	AS Ain M'lila	Sidi Bel Abbès
22:30	Seguer 90+6' (pen.)	Soccerway report		Stadium: Stade 24 Fevrier 1956; Referee: Merzoug Brahimi

16 May 2019 Round 28	Paradou AC	1–2	USM Bel Abbès	Bologhine
22:30	Loucif 17'	Soccerway report	Seguer 49'; Belhocini 77'	Stadium: Omar Hamadi Stadium; Referee: Redouane Necib

21 May 2019 Round 29	USM Bel Abbès	2–1	MC Alger	Sidi Bel Abbès
22:30	Benayad 77', 80'	Soccerway report	Dieng 72'	Stadium: Stade 24 Fevrier 1956; Referee: Boubekeur Zouaoui

26 May 2019 Round 30	CR Belouizdad	1–0	USM Bel Abbès	Belouizdad
22:30	Sayoud 23'	Soccerway report		Stadium: Stade 20 Août 1955; Referee: Said Aouina

== Algerian Cup ==
27 December 2018 Round of 64	USM Bel Abbès	2–0	MS Cherchell	Sidi Bel Abbès
15:00	Mesmoudi 10'; Tabti 90+1'			Stadium: Stade 24 Fevrier 1956; Referee: Benyahia

31 December 2018 Round of 32	USM Alger	2–1 (a.e.t.)	USM Bel Abbès	Algiers
17:09	Ardji 45'; Hamia 107'		Benayad 49'	Stadium: Omar Hamadi Stadium; Referee: Rafik Achouri

== Algerian Super Cup ==
1 November 2018	CS Constantine	0–1	USM Bel Abbès	Blida
17:00		Report; Live TV: Algérie 3 / Canal Algérie / Al-Kass Sports	Lamara 90+4' (pen.)	Stadium: Mustapha Tchaker Stadium; Referee: Mohamed Saïdi

== Confederation Cup ==
=== Preliminary round ===
27 November 2018 First leg	USM Bel Abbès (Algeria)	4–0	(Liberia) LISCR	Sidi Bel Abbès
15:30 UTC+1	Belahouel 24' (pen.); Seguer 76', 87'; Lamara 90+2'	Report		Stadium: Stade du 24 Février; Referee: Noureddine El Jaafari (Morocco)

5 December 2018 Second leg	LISCR (Liberia)	1–0	(Algeria) USM Bel Abbès	Monrovia
16:00 UTC+0	Sheriff 30'	Report		Stadium: Antoinette Tubman Stadium; Referee: Mathioro Diabel (Mauritania)

=== First round ===
15 December 2018 First leg	USM Bel Abbès (Algeria)	0–0	(Nigeria) Enugu Rangers	Sidi Bel Abbès
16:00 UTC+1		Report		Stadium: Stade du 24 Février; Referee: Isaac Montgomery (Liberia)

23 December 2018 Second leg	Enugu Rangers (Nigeria)	2–0	(Algeria) USM Bel Abbès	Enugu
16:00 UTC+1	Silas 6', 45+1'	Report		Stadium: Nnamdi Azikiwe Stadium; Referee: Issa Sy (Senegal)

== Squad information ==
=== Playing statistics ===
No.	Pos	Nat	Player	Total		Ligue 1		Algerian Cup		Super Cup		Confederation Cup	
No.	Pos	Nat	Player	Apps	Goals	Apps	Goals	Apps	Goals	Apps	Goals	Apps	Goals
Goalkeepers
16	GK	(Algeria) ALG	Sofiane Khedairia	16	0	13	0	0	0	0	0	3	0
1	GK	(Algeria) ALG	Nadjib Ghoul	11	0	10	0	0	0	1	0	0	0
30	GK	(Algeria) ALG	Abdelkader Zarat Belmokhtar	10	0	9	0	1	0	0	0	0	0
Defenders
4	DF	(Algeria) ALG	Nasreddine Benlebna	16	0	14	0	1	0	0	0	1	0
3	DF	(Algeria) ALG	Boualem Mesmoudi	27	3	22	2	1	1	1	0	3	0
2	DF	(Algeria) ALG	Samir Zerrouki	14	0	12	0	1	0	0	0	1	0
22	DF	(Algeria) ALG	Ishak Guebli	18	1	13	1	1	0	1	0	3	0
19	DF	(Algeria) ALG	Zakaria Khali	30	3	26	3	1	0	1	0	2	0
20	DF	(Algeria) ALG	Abderrahim Abdelli	23	0	20	0	1	0	0	0	2	0
18	DF	(Algeria) ALG	Fateh Achour	16	0	14	0	0	0	0	0	2	0
24	DF	(Algeria) ALG	Anes Abbas	10	0	9	0	0	0	0	0	1	0
Midfielders
23	MF	(Algeria) ALG	Nabil Aït Ferguene	20	2	18	2	0	0	1	0	1	0
10	MF	(Algeria) ALG	Abdessamed Bounoua	33	0	28	0	1	0	1	0	3	0
17	MF	(Algeria) ALG	Ishak Bouda	23	1	18	1	1	0	1	0	3	0
5	MF	(Algeria) ALG	Larbi Tabti	19	3	15	2	1	1	1	0	2	0
6	MF	(Algeria) ALG	Mohamed Lagraâ	28	0	26	0	0	0	1	0	1	0
7	MF	(Algeria) ALG	Abdennour Iheb Belhocini	9	1	9	1	0	0	0	0	0	0
29	MF	(Algeria) ALG	Yahia Labani	15	0	15	0	0	0	0	0	0	0
25	MF	(Algeria) ALG	Sid Ahmed Abbaci	1	0	0	0	0	0	0	0	1	0
	MF	(Algeria) ALG	Sofiane Ouari	1	0	1	0	0	0	0	0	0	0
	MF	(Algeria) ALG	Houari Boumediene Belal	1	0	1	0	0	0	0	0	0	0
Forwards
8	FW	(Algeria) ALG	Hamza Belahouel	19	3	18	2	0	0	0	0	1	1
26	FW	(Algeria) ALG	Mouloud Nabil Metref	18	0	13	0	1	0	1	0	3	0
11	FW	(Algeria) ALG	Mourad Benayad	33	5	28	5	1	0	1	0	3	0
21	FW	(Algeria) ALG	Mohamed Seguer	26	6	22	4	1	0	1	0	2	2
9	FW	(Algeria) ALG	Ameur Bouguettaya	16	0	15	0	1	0	0	0	0	0
Players transferred out during the season
15	DF	(Algeria) ALG	Nabil Lamara	16	2	12	0	0	0	1	1	3	1
27	FW	(Algeria) ALG	Abdelkrim Zouari	16	1	14	1	0	0	1	0	1	0

Last updated: 11 June 2018
Source: fr.soccerway.com

== Squad list ==
As of August 11, 2018. Note: Flags indicate national team as defined under FIFA eligibility rules; some limited exceptions apply. Players may hold more than one non-FIFA nationality.

No.	Pos.	Nation	Player
1	GK	ALG	Nadjib Ghoul
2	DF	ALG	Samir Zerrouki
3	DF	ALG	Boualem Mesmoudi
4	DF	ALG	Nasreddine Benlebna
5	MF	ALG	Larbi Tabti
6	MF	ALG	Mohamed Lagraâ
7	MF	ALG	Abdennour Iheb Belhocini
8	FW	ALG	Hamza Belahouel
9	FW	ALG	Ameur Bouguettaya
10	MF	ALG	Abdessamed Bounoua
11	FW	ALG	Mourad Benayad
15	DF	ALG	Nabil Lamara
16	GK	ALG	Sofiane Khedairia
17	MF	ALG	Ishak Bouda

No.	Pos.	Nation	Player
18	DF	ALG	Fateh Achour
19	DF	ALG	Zakaria Khali
20	DF	ALG	Abderrahim Abdelli
21	FW	ALG	Mohamed Seguer
22	DF	ALG	Ishak Guebli
23	MF	ALG	Nabil Aït Ferguene
24	DF	ALG	Anes Abbas
25	MF	ALG	Sid Ahmed Abbaci
26	FW	ALG	Mouloud Nabil Metref
27	FW	ALG	Abdelkrim Zouari
28	FW	ALG	Sid Ahmed El Mahi
29	MF	ALG	Yahia Labani
30	GK	ALG	Abdelkader Zarat Belmokhtar

== Transfers ==
=== In ===
Date	Pos	Player	From club	Transfer fee	Source
5 June 2018	DF	(Algeria) Boualem Masmoudi	ASM Oran	Free transfer	
5 June 2018	DF	(Algeria) Fateh Achour	GC Mascara	Free transfer	
8 June 2018	GK	(Algeria) Sofiane Khedairia	JSM Béjaïa	Free transfer	
19 June 2018	FW	(Algeria) Mourad Benayad	ES Sétif	Free transfer (Released)	

=== Out ===
Date	Pos	Player	To club	Transfer fee	Source
4 June 2018	FW	(Algeria) Habib Bouguelmouna	ES Sétif	Free transfer	
22 June 2018	FW	(Algeria) Djamel Chettal	CR Belouizdad	Free transfer	
18 July 2018	GK	(Algeria) Athmane Toual	MO Béjaïa	Free transfer	
