= 2019–20 USM Bel Abbès season =

Football season in Algerian Ligue 1

USM Bel-Abbès
2019–20 season
- Chairman: Kaddour Benayad
- Head coach: Younes Ifticène (from 31 July 2019) (until 16 August 2019); Abdelkader Yaiche (from 8 September 2019) (until 1 March 2020)
- Stadium: Stade 24 Fevrier 1956
- Ligue 1: 11th
- Algerian Cup: Canceled
- Top goalscorer: League: Abdennour Belhocini (10 goals); All: Abdennour Belhocini (10 goals)

In the 2019–20 season, USM Bel Abbès competed in the Ligue 1 for the 25th season, as well as the Algerian Cup. On March 15, 2020, the Ligue de Football Professionnel (LFP) decided to halt the season due to the COVID-19 pandemic in Algeria. On July 29, 2020, the LFP declared the over and CR Belouizdad to be the champion, the promotion of four teams from the League 2, and scraping the relegation for the current season.

== Competitions ==
=== Overview ===
Competition	Record								Started round	Final position / round	First match	Last match
Competition	G	W	D	L	GF	GA	GD	Win %	Started round	Final position / round	First match	Last match
Ligue 1	21	8	2	11	22	31	−9	38.10	—N/a	11th	17 August 2019	5 March 2020
Algerian Cup	4	4	0	0	9	1	+8	100.00	Round of 64	Quarter-finals	28 December 2019	11 March 2020
Total	25	12	2	11	31	32	−1	48.00				

Updated to match played 3 June 2019
Source: Competitions

== League table ==
Pos	Team	Pld	W	D	L	GF	GA	GD	Pts	PPG
9	MC Oran	22	7	9	6	28	24	+4	30	1.36
10	Paradou AC	20	7	5	8	20	18	+2	26	1.30
11	USM Bel Abbès	21	8	2	11	22	31	−9	26	1.24
12	ASO Chlef	21	6	7	8	15	17	−2	25	1.19
13	CA Bordj Bou Arreridj	22	6	7	9	22	29	−7	25	1.14

Updated to match(es) played on 15 March 2020. Source: dzfoot.com
Rules for classification: 1) points; 2) head-to-head points; 3) head-to-head goal difference; 4) goal difference; 5) total goals; 6) fairplay ranking; 7) playoff.

=== Results summary ===
Overall								Home						Away					
Pld	W	D	L	GF	GA	GD	Pts	W	D	L	GF	GA	GD	W	D	L	GF	GA	GD
21	8	2	11	22	31	−9	26	5	1	4	14	12	+2	3	1	7	8	19	−11

Last updated: 22 April 2018.
Source: Competitive matches

=== Results by round ===
Round	1	2	3	4	5	6	7	8	9	10	11	12	13	14	15	16	17	18	19	20	21	22	23	24	25	26	27	28	29	30
Ground	A	H	A	H	A	H	A	H	A	A	H	A	H	A	H	H	A	H	A	H	A	H	A	H	H	A	H	A	H	A
Result	L	L	L	D	W	W	W	L	L	L	W	L	W	W	W	L	L	W	D	L	L	C	C	C	C	C	C	C	C	C
Position	16	16	16	15	15	11	7	9	11	13	10	11	10	9	6	9	11	8	9	10	11	11	11	11	11	11	11	11	11	11

Updated to match(es) played on 22 April 2019. Source: Competitive matches
A = Away; H = Home; W = Win; D = Draw; L = Loss

=== Matches ===
Win Draw Loss

17 August 2019 Round 1	MC Oran	3–1	USM Bel Abbès	Oran
20:45	Mansouri 18' (pen.); Mesmoudi 58'; Guertil 70'	Soccerway report	Belhocini 50' (pen.)	Stadium: Ahmed Zabana Stadium; Referee: Said Aouina

24 August 2019 Round 2	USM Bel Abbès	1–3	CA Bordj Bou Arreridj	Sidi Bel Abbès
21:00	Belhocini 35' (pen.)	Soccerway report	Arroussi 47'; Abbas 58' (o.g.); Zerara 77'	Stadium: Stade 24 Fevrier 1956; Referee: Lyés Bekouassa

30 August 2019 Round 3	NC Magra	2–1	USM Bel Abbès	Sétif
20:00	Tatem 65'; Demane 81'	Soccerway report	Aichi 62'	Stadium: Stade 8 Mai 1945; Attendance: 0 (close doors); Referee: Hamza Bouslimani

12 September 2019 Round 4	USM Bel Abbès	1–1	NA Hussein Dey	Sidi Bel Abbès
17:45	Belhocini 33' (pen.)	Soccerway report	Zerdoum 68'	Stadium: Stade 24 Fevrier 1956; Referee: Rafik Achouri

24 September 2019 Round 5	US Biskra	1–2	USM Bel Abbès	Biskra
19:00	Boufligha 81'	Soccerway report	Bouda 3'; Gharbi 45'	Stadium: Stade du 18 Février; Referee: Hamza Boucetta

5 October 2019 Round 7	ASO Chlef	0–1	USM Bel Abbès	Chlef
18:45		Soccerway report	Benamrane 10' (o.g.)	Stadium: Stade Mohamed Boumezrag; Referee: Youcef Gamouh

23 October 2019 Round 8	USM Bel Abbès	0–1	CR Belouizdad	Sidi Bel Abbès
18:00		Soccerway report	Bouchar 17'	Stadium: Stade 24 Fevrier 1956; Referee: Yazid Ibrir

4 November 2019 Round 6	USM Bel Abbès	2–1	JS Kabylie	Sidi Bel Abbès
18:45	Barka 25'; Belhocini 62'	Soccerway report	Bencherifa 66'	Stadium: Stade 24 Fevrier 1956; Referee: Mehdi Abid Charef

9 November 2019 Round 10	ES Sétif	2–1	USM Bel Abbès	Sétif
18:00	Bouguelmouna 69'; Ghacha 89'	Soccerway report	Bouguettaya 90'	Stadium: Stade 8 Mai 1945; Referee: Hamza Bouslimani

23 November 2019 Round 11	USM Bel Abbès	2–1	CS Constantine	Sidi Bel Abbès
15:00	Aichi 71'; Belhocini 78'	Soccerway report	Abid 15'	Stadium: Stade 24 Fevrier 1956; Referee: Lyés Bekouassa

30 November 2019 Round 12	AS Ain M'lila	3–0	USM Bel Abbès	Aïn M'lila
15:00	Ibouzidène 56'; Achour 65' (o.g.); Debbih 67'	Soccerway report		Stadium: Touhami Zoubir Khelifi Stadium; Referee: Ahmed Bouzrar

7 December 2019 Round 13	USM Bel Abbès	3–1	MC Alger	Sidi Bel Abbès
15:00	Belhocini 42', 80' (pen.); Haddad 89'	Soccerway report	Alati 38'	Stadium: Stade 24 Fevrier 1956; Referee: Youcef Gamouh

16 December 2019 Round 14	JS Saoura	0–1	USM Bel Abbès	Béchar
17:00		Soccerway report	Metref 79'	Stadium: Stade 20 Août 1955; Referee: Amine Sekhraoui

21 December 2019 Round 15	USM Bel Abbès	1–0	USM Alger	Sidi Bel Abbès
18:45	Litt 87'	Soccerway report		Stadium: Stade 24 Fevrier 1956; Referee: Redouane Necib

8 January 2020 Round 9	Paradou AC	3–0	USM Bel Abbès	Bologhine
17:00	Zorgane 13'; Guenaoui 35', 53'	Soccerway report		Stadium: Omar Hamadi Stadium; Referee: Farouk Mial

1 February 2020 Round 16	USM Bel Abbès	1–2	MC Oran	Sidi Bel Abbès
18:45	Litt 45'	Soccerway report	Nadji 4', 63'	Stadium: Stade 24 Fevrier 1956; Referee: Ahmed Bouzrar

8 February 2020 Round 17	CA Bordj Bou Arreridj	2–0	USM Bel Abbès	Bordj Bou Arréridj
15:00	Yousif 53'; Belameiri 90+2'	Soccerway report		Stadium: August 20, 1955 Stadium; Referee: Lotfi Bekouassa

17 February 2020 Round 18	USM Bel Abbès	3–1	NC Magra	Sidi Bel Abbès
17:00	Belhocini 8', 42', 75'	Soccerway report	Billel 50'	Stadium: Stade 24 Fevrier 1956; Referee: Houssam Benyahia

22 February 2020 Round 19	NA Hussein Dey	1–1	USM Bel Abbès	Belouizdad
16:00	Ferraz 79'	Soccerway report	Haddad 52'	Stadium: Stade 20 Août 1955; Referee: Malek Ait Ameur

29 February 2020 Round 20	USM Bel Abbès	0–1	US Biskra	Sidi Bel Abbès
17:00		Soccerway report	Mokhtar 62'	Stadium: Stade 24 Fevrier 1956; Referee: Lahlou Benbraham

5 March 2020 Round 21	JS Kabylie	2–0	USM Bel Abbès	Tizi Ouzou
16:00	Belgherbi 8', 72'	Soccerway report		Stadium: Stade 1er Novembre 1954; Referee: Rafik Achouri

16 March 2020 Round 22	USM Bel Abbès	Cancelled	ASO Chlef	Sidi Bel Abbès
16:00		Soccerway report		Stadium: Stade 24 Fevrier 1956; Attendance: 0 (close doors); Referee: Hamza Boucetta
Note: Match was postponed due to coronavirus pandemic.

Round 23	CR Belouizdad	Cancelled	USM Bel Abbès	Belouizdad
				Stadium: Stade 20 Août 1955

Round 24	USM Bel Abbès	Cancelled	Paradou AC	Sidi Bel Abbès
				Stadium: Stade 24 Fevrier 1956

Round 25	USM Bel Abbès	Cancelled	ES Sétif	Sidi Bel Abbès
				Stadium: Stade 24 Fevrier 1956

Round 26	CS Constantine	Cancelled	USM Bel Abbès	Constantine
				Stadium: Stade Mohamed Hamlaoui

Round 27	USM Bel Abbès	Cancelled	AS Aïn M'lila	Sidi Bel Abbès
				Stadium: Stade 24 Fevrier 1956

Round 28	MC Alger	Cancelled	USM Bel Abbès	Algiers
				Stadium: July 5, 1962 Stadium

Round 29	USM Bel Abbès	Cancelled	JS Saoura	Sidi Bel Abbès
				Stadium: Stade 24 Fevrier 1956

Round 30	USM Alger	Cancelled	USM Bel Abbès	Bologhine
				Stadium: Omar Hamadi Stadium

== Algerian Cup ==
28 December 2019 Round of 64	NT Souf	1–3	USM Bel Abbès	El Oued
14:00	Kheir 80' (pen.)	Report	Litt 8'; Soltani 47' (pen.); Metref 61'	Stadium: Stade 20 Août 1955; Referee: Ait Ammar, Samsoum, Laagab
Note: Lineup for USM Bel Abbès - Zarat Belmokhtar, Abdelli, Koulkheir, Abbas, Benlebna, Haddad (Houari 68’), Litt (Abbaci 74’), Zerrouki, Gharbi, Soltani, Metref

4 January 2020 Round of 32	SC Mecheria	0–2	USM Bel Abbès	Mécheria
14:00		Report	Litt 31'; Soltani 65'	Stadium: Stade 20 août 1955; Referee: Bilal Bendjahene
Note: Lineup for USM Bel Abbès - Zarat Belmokhtar, Abdelli, Barka, Koulkheir, Abbas, Benlebna, Litt, Abbaci (Houari 70’), Soltani (Moussa 70’), Gharbi, Metref (Aichi 66’)

13 February 2020 Round of 16	USM Bel Abbès	1–0	USM Annaba	Sidi Bel Abbès
15:00	Bouguettaya 61'	Report		Stadium: Stade 24 Fevrier 1956; Referee: Amine Sekhraoui
Note: Lineup for USM Bel Abbès - Morcely, Barka, Hamza, Abbas, Abdelli, Koulkheir, Bouguettaya, Gharbi (Belhocini 46’), Soltani (Abbaci 84’), Litt, Aichi (Metref 46’)

11 March 2020 QF 1st leg	USM Bel Abbès	3–0	Amal Bou Saâda	Sidi Bel Abbès
16:00	Barka 30'; Litt 80'; Hamza 90+3'	Soccerway report		Stadium: Stade 24 Fevrier 1956; Attendance: 0 (close doors); Referee: Redouane Necib
Note: due to coronavirus outbreak, Ministry of Health, Population and Hospital Reform decided to be all matches played behind closed doors.

TBD QF 2nd leg	Amal Bou Saâda	Cancelled	USM Bel Abbès	Bou Saâda
TBD				Stadium: Stade Mokhtar Abdelatif; Attendance: 0 (close doors)
Note: due to coronavirus outbreak, Ministry of Health, Population and Hospital Reform decided to be all matches played behind closed doors.

== Squad information ==
=== Playing statistics ===
No.	Pos	Nat	Player	Total		Ligue 1		Algerian Cup	
No.	Pos	Nat	Player	Apps	Goals	Apps	Goals	Apps	Goals
Goalkeepers
1	GK	(Algeria) ALG	Nadjib Ghoul	2	0	2	0	0	0
16	GK	(Algeria) ALG	Abdelkader Morcely	10	0	10	0	0	0
30	GK	(Algeria) ALG	Abdelkader Zarat Belmokhtar	9	0	9	0	0	0
Defenders
2	DF	(Algeria) ALG	Samir Zerrouki	6	0	6	0	0	0
3	DF	(Algeria) ALG	Nazim Harchaoui	0	0	0	0	0	0
4	DF	(Algeria) ALG	Nasreddine Benlebna	20	0	20	0	0	0
5	DF	(Algeria) ALG	Mohammed Hamza	13	1	13	1	0	0
13	DF	(Algeria) ALG	Mohamed El Amine Barka	19	0	19	0	0	0
14	DF	(Algeria) ALG	Anes Saad	7	0	7	0	0	0
18	DF	(Algeria) ALG	Fateh Achour	12	0	12	0	0	0
20	DF	(Algeria) ALG	Abderrahim Abdelli	14	0	14	0	0	0
24	DF	(Algeria) ALG	Anes Abbas	9	0	9	0	0	0
27	DF	(Algeria) ALG	Mokhtar Benmoussa	1	0	1	0	0	0
Midfielders
6	MF	(Algeria) ALG	Younes Koulkheir	18	0	18	0	0	0
8	MF	(Algeria) ALG	Sabri Gharbi	10	1	10	1	0	0
10	MF	(Algeria) ALG	Abdennour Belhocini	17	10	17	10	0	0
22	MF	(Algeria) ALG	Redouane Bounoua	0	0	0	0	0	0
23	MF	(Algeria) ALG	Chams-Eddine Haddad	18	2	18	2	0	0
25	MF	(Algeria) ALG	Sid Ahmed Abbaci	3	0	3	0	0	0
28	MF	(Algeria) ALG	Yahia Miloud Koufi	0	0	0	0	0	0
Forwards
9	FW	(Algeria) ALG	Ameur Bouguettaya	13	1	13	1	0	0
12	FW	(Algeria) ALG	Mohamed Kamel Soltani	14	0	14	0	0	0
15	FW	(Algeria) ALG	Mounir Aichi	16	2	16	2	0	0
17	FW	(Algeria) ALG	Ishak Bouda	16	1	16	1	0	0
21	FW	(Algeria) ALG	Abdelaziz Litt	18	2	18	2	0	0
26	FW	(Algeria) ALG	Mouloud Nabil Metref	13	1	13	1	0	0
Players transferred out during the season
7	FW	(Algeria) ALG	Okacha Hamzaoui	2	0	2	0	0	0

Last updated: 11 June 2018
Source: fr.soccerway.com

=== Goalscorers ===
Includes all competitive matches. The list is sorted alphabetically by surname when total goals are equal.

No.	Nat.	Player	Pos.	L 1	AC	TOTAL
10	(Algeria)	Abdennour Belhocini	MF	10	0	10
21	(Algeria)	Abdelaziz Litt	FW	2	3	5
23	(Algeria)	Chams-Eddine Haddad	MF	2	0	2
15	(Algeria)	Mounir Aichi	FW	2	0	2
5	(Algeria)	Mohammed Hamza	DF	1	1	2
26	(Algeria)	Mouloud Nabil Metref	FW	1	1	2
9	(Algeria)	Ameur Bouguettaya	FW	1	1	2
12	(Algeria)	Mohamed Kamel Soltani	FW	0	2	2
17	(Algeria)	Ishak Bouda	DF	1	0	1
8	(Algeria)	Sabri Gharbi	MF	1	0	1
13	(Algeria)	Mohamed El Amine Barka	DF	0	1	1
Own Goals				1	0	1
Totals				22	9	31

== Squad list ==
As of 15 August, 2019. Note: Flags indicate national team as defined under FIFA eligibility rules; some limited exceptions apply. Players may hold more than one non-FIFA nationality.

No.	Pos.	Nation	Player
1	GK	ALG	Nadjib Ghoul
2	DF	ALG	Samir Zerrouki
3	DF	ALG	Nazim Harchaoui
4	DF	ALG	Nasreddine Benlebna
5	DF	ALG	Mohammed Hamza
6	MF	ALG	Younes Koulkheir
7	FW	ALG	Okacha Hamzaoui
8	MF	ALG	Sabri Gharbi
9	FW	ALG	Ameur Bouguettaya
10	MF	ALG	Abdennour Belhocini (captain)
12	FW	ALG	Mohamed Kamel Soltani
13	DF	ALG	Mohamed El Amine Barka
14	DF	ALG	Anes Saad
15	FW	ALG	Mounir Aichi

No.	Pos.	Nation	Player
16	GK	ALG	Abdelkader Morcely
17	FW	ALG	Ishak Bouda
18	DF	ALG	Fateh Achour
20	DF	ALG	Abderrahim Abdelli
21	FW	ALG	Abdelaziz Litt
22	MF	ALG	Redouane Bounoua
23	MF	ALG	Chams-Eddine Haddad
24	DF	ALG	Anes Abbas
25	MF	ALG	Sid Ahmed Abbaci
26	FW	ALG	Mouloud Nabil Metref
27	DF	ALG	Mokhtar Benmoussa
28	MF	ALG	Yahia Miloud Koufi
30	GK	ALG	Abdelkader Zarat Belmokhtar

== Transfers ==
=== In ===
Date	Pos	Player	from club	Transfer fee	Source
17 July 2019	GK	(Algeria) Abdelkader Morcely	MC Alger	Free transfer	
17 July 2019	MF	(Algeria) Sabri Gharbi	MC Oran	Free transfer	
23 July 2019	FW	(Algeria) Mounir Aichi	CS Constantine	Free transfer	
31 July 2019	FW	(Mali) Moctar Cissé	(Saudi Arabia) Al-Ain	Free transfer	
1 August 2019	DF	(Algeria) Mokhtar Benmoussa	USM Alger	Free transfer	
7 August 2019	FW	(Algeria) Okacha Hamzaoui	(Portugal) Nacional	Free transfer	

=== Out ===
Date	Pos	Player	To club	Transfer fee	Source
20 June 2019	MF	(Algeria) Abdessamed Bounoua	JS Kabylie	Free transfer	
30 June 2019	DF	(Algeria) Mohamed Lagraâ	MC Oran	Free transfer	
1 July 2019	DF	(Algeria) Zakaria Khali	CR Belouizdad	Free transfer	
6 July 2019	MF	(Algeria) Larbi Tabti	CR Belouizdad	Free transfer	
7 July 2019	FW	(Algeria) Mourad Benayad	CA Bordj Bou Arreridj	Free transfer	
20 July 2019	DF	(Algeria) Boualem Mesmoudi	MC Oran	Free transfer	
25 July 2019	GK	(Algeria) Sofiane Khedairia	ES Sétif	Free transfer	
27 July 2019	FW	(Algeria) Mohamed Seguer	RC Relizane	Free transfer	
31 July 2019	GK	(Algeria) Athmane Toual	MC Alger	Free transfer	
15 January 2020	FW	(Algeria) Okacha Hamzaoui	(Iran) Tractor	Free transfer	
