= 2020–21 RC Relizane season =

RC Relizane
2020–21 season
- Head coach: Tahar Chérif El-Ouazzani (from 27 September 2020) (until 28 June 2021); Lyamine Bougherara (from 4 July 2021)
- Stadium: Stade Tahar Zoughari
- Ligue 1: 13th
- League Cup: Round of 16
- Highest home attendance: 0 (Note: no one can attend games due to the COVID-19 pandemic)
- Lowest home attendance: 0 (Note: no one can attend games due to the COVID-19 pandemic)
- Average home league attendance: 0 (Note: no one can attend games due to the COVID-19 pandemic)

In the 2020–21 season, RC Relizane is competing in the Ligue 1 for the 8th season, and League Cup.

== Squad list ==
Players and squad numbers last updated on 15 November 2020.
Note: Flags indicate national team as has been defined under FIFA eligibility rules. Players may hold more than one non-FIFA nationality.

No.	Nat.	Position	Name	Date of birth (age)	Signed from
Goalkeepers
1	(Algeria)	GK	Mustapha Zaidi	20 May 1985 (aged 35)	(Algeria) Olympique de Médéa
19	(Algeria)	GK	Hamza Bousseder	17 February 1991 (aged 29)	(Algeria) US Biskra
19	(Algeria)	GK	Omar Hamou	20 May 1999 (aged 21)	(Algeria) Youth system
Defenders
39	(Algeria)		Abdelkader Meguenine	26 January 2000 (aged 20)	(Algeria) Youth system
2	(Algeria)	RB	Rabah Aich	18 July 1992 (aged 28)	(Algeria) CR Belouizdad
3	(Algeria)	RB	Mohamed El Amine Barka	20 March 1993 (aged 27)	(Algeria) USM Bel Abbès
4	(Algeria)	LB	Bouabdellah Chadouli	22 March 1998 (aged 22)	(Algeria) ?
5	(Algeria)	CB	Arslane Mazari	6 January 1989 (aged 31)	(Algeria) MO Béjaïa
17	(Algeria)	CB	Amar Khaled Nèche	27 July 1994 (aged 26)	(Algeria) US Beni Douala
23	(Algeria)	CB	Mohamed Amine Zidane	5 October 1983 (aged 37)	(Algeria) ASM Oran
25	(Algeria)	LB	Seifeddine Chettih	28 May 1991 (aged 29)	(Algeria) Olympique de Médéa
26	(Algeria)	RB	Billel Bouzid	18 December 1996 (aged 24)	(Algeria) Youth system
Midfielders
6	(Algeria)	DM	Aymen Chadli	3 September 1999 (aged 21)	(Algeria) Youth system
7	(Algeria)	RM	Mehdi Kadri	14 March 1995 (aged 25)	(Algeria) MO Béjaïa
8	(Algeria)	AM	Bouazza Feham	11 April 1986 (aged 34)	(Algeria) MO Béjaïa
11	(Algeria)	AM	Walid Hellal	1 August 1994 (aged 26)	(Algeria) ASO Chlef
10	(Algeria)	DM	Sabri Gharbi	26 May 1987 (aged 33)	(Algeria) USM Bel Abbès
12	(Algeria)	DM	Mohamed Reda Nekrouf	27 April 1994 (aged 26)	(Algeria) MC Saïda
14	(Algeria)	AM	Houcine Aoued	21 April 1999 (aged 21)	(Algeria) Youth system
15	(Algeria)		Noufel Ould Hamou	16 February 1999 (aged 21)	(Algeria) CR Belouizdad
20	(Algeria)	DM	Fouad Allag	17 April 1985 (aged 35)	(Algeria) NA Hussein Dey
21	(Algeria)	AM	Abdelmalek Elmenaouer	16 January 1997 (aged 23)	(Algeria) Youth system
22	(Algeria)		Youcef Tahirine	9 July 1998 (aged 22)	(Algeria) Youth system
24	(Algeria)	DM	Younes Koulkheir	1 June 1996 (aged 24)	(Algeria) USM Bel Abbès
Forwards
9	(Algeria)		Ramdane Hitala	8 February 1995 (aged 25)	(Algeria) ASM Oran
13	(Algeria)		Abdelillah Barkat	8 August 1996 (aged 24)	(Algeria) IS Tighennif
18	(Algeria)	ST	Mohamed Seguer	7 September 1985 (aged 35)	(Algeria) USM Bel Abbès
49	(Algeria)		Ahmed Belalia	9 June 2000 (aged 20)	(Algeria) Youth system
27	(Algeria)	LW	Abou Sofiane Balegh	17 August 1988 (aged 32)	(Algeria) CS Constantine

== Competitions ==
=== Overview ===
Competition	Record								Started round	Final position / round	First match	Last match
Competition	G	W	D	L	GF	GA	GD	Win %	Started round	Final position / round	First match	Last match
Ligue 1	0	0	0	0	0	0	+0	—	—N/a	To be confirmed	In Progress	In Progress
League Cup	0	0	0	0	0	0	+0	—	Round of 16	To be confirmed	In Progress	In Progress
Total	0	0	0	0	0	0	+0	—				

Updated to match played 7 March 2020
Source: Competitions

== League table ==
Pos	Team	Pld	W	D	L	GF	GA	GD	Pts
11	Paradou AC	38	13	11	14	53	53	0	50
12	NA Hussein Dey	38	11	14	13	46	45	+1	47
13	RC Relizane	38	13	12	13	35	49	−14	47 (Note: On May 16, 2021 after the participation of a penalized player Younes Koulkheir with RC Relizane against ES Sétif. RC Relizane Lost the match 3–0 and deducted 4 points.)
14	US Biskra	38	11	13	14	32	46	−14	46
15	WA Tlemcen	38	12	9	17	40	47	−7	45

Updated to match(es) played on 28 August 2021. Source: dzfoot.com
Rules for classification: 1) points; 2) head-to-head points; 3) head-to-head goal difference; 4) goal difference; 5) total goals; 6) fairplay ranking; 7) playoff.

=== Results summary ===
Overall								Home						Away					
Pld	W	D	L	GF	GA	GD	Pts	W	D	L	GF	GA	GD	W	D	L	GF	GA	GD
0	0	0	0	0	0	0	0	0	0	0	0	0	0	0	0	0	0	0	0

Last updated: 7 March 2020.
Source: Competitive matches

=== Results by round ===
Round	1	2	3	4	5	6	7	8	9	10	11	12	13	14	15	16	17	18	19	20	21	22	23	24	25	26	27	28	29	30	31	32	33	34	35	36	37	38
Ground																																						
Result	D	D	D	W	L	L	W	L	L	D	D	W	W	L	L	W	L	W	D	L	D	L	D	D	W	L	L	L	W	W	W	W	W	D	D	W	D	L
Position	9	11	11	7	12	13	9	12	12	12	14	13	12	12	14	12	12	12	12	12	15	16	15	14	14	17	17	17	17	16	14	12	11	11	12	12	12	13

Updated to match(es) played on 24 August 2021. Source: Competitive matches
A = Away; H = Home; W = Win; D = Draw; L = Loss

=== Matches ===
On 22 October 2020, the Algerian Ligue Professionnelle 1 fixtures were announced.

27 November 2020 Round 1	RC Relizane	1–1	Paradou AC	Relizane
15:00	Hitala 44'	Soccerway report	Benbouali 17'	Stadium: Stade Tahar Zoughari; Attendance: 0 (close doors); Referee: Mehdi Abid Charef

5 December 2020 Round 2	ES Sétif	1–1	RC Relizane	Sétif
15:00	Saadi 54'	Soccerway report	Hitala 44' (pen.)	Stadium: Stade 8 Mai 1945; Attendance: 0 (close doors); Referee: Amine Hansal

11 December 2020 Round 3	RC Relizane	0–0	JS Saoura	Relizane
14:00		Soccerway report		Stadium: Stade Tahar Zoughari; Attendance: 0 (close doors); Referee: Houssam Benyahia

18 December 2020 Round 4	CA Bordj Bou Arreridj	0–1	RC Relizane	Bordj Bou Arréridj
15:00		Soccerway report	Chadli 49'	Stadium: Stade 20 Août 1955; Attendance: 0 (close doors); Referee: Hamza Boucetta

23 December 2020 Round 5	RC Relizane	0–1	MC Alger	Relizane
14:30		Soccerway report	Bourdim 52'	Stadium: Stade Tahar Zoughari; Attendance: 0 (close doors); Referee: Yazid Ibrir

27 December 2020 Round 6	MC Oran	1–0	RC Relizane	Oran
15:00	Boutiche 27' (pen.)	Soccerway report		Stadium: Ahmed Zabana Stadium; Attendance: 0 (close doors); Referee: Said Aouina

9 January 2021 Round 7	RC Relizane	2–0	US Biskra	Relizane
14:30	Chadli 60'; Barkat 76'	Soccerway report		Stadium: Stade Tahar Zoughari; Attendance: 0 (close doors); Referee: Hamza Bouslimani

16 January 2021 Round 8	USM Alger	3–1	RC Relizane	Bologhine
15:00	Belkacemi 18'; Koudri 52', 85'	Soccerway report	Aoued 72'	Stadium: Omar Hamadi Stadium; Attendance: 0 (close doors); Referee: Redouane Necib

22 January 2021 Round 9	RC Relizane	0–1	CR Belouizdad	Relizane
14:30		Soccerway report	Draoui 25'	Stadium: Stade Tahar Zoughari; Attendance: 0 (close doors); Referee: Mehdi Abid Charef

26 January 2021 Round 10	AS Aïn M'lila	0–0	RC Relizane	Aïn M'lila
14:30		Soccerway report		Stadium: Touhami Zoubir Khelifi Stadium; Attendance: 0 (close doors); Referee: Ahmed Bouzrar

30 January 2021 Round 11	RC Relizane	0–0	WA Tlemcen	Relizane
14:30		Soccerway report		Stadium: Stade Tahar Zoughari; Attendance: 0 (close doors); Referee: Amine Hansal

6 February 2021 Round 12	NC Magra	0–1	RC Relizane	Magra
15:00		Soccerway report	Aoued 78'	Stadium: Boucheligue Brothers Stadium; Attendance: 0 (close doors); Referee: Houssam Benyahia

13 February 2021 Round 13	RC Relizane	2–1	JSM Skikda	Relizane
14:30	Balegh 31'; Chettih 77'	Soccerway report	Merzougi 82'	Stadium: Stade Tahar Zoughari; Attendance: 0 (close doors); Referee: Mustapha Ghorbal

26 February 2021 Round 15	NA Hussein Dey	3–0	RC Relizane	Belouizdad
15:00	Nadji 16'; Meftah 25'; Banouh 90+3'	Soccerway report		Stadium: Stade 20 Août 1955; Attendance: 0 (close doors); Referee: Houssam Benyahia

5 March 2021 Round 16	RC Relizane	1–0	USM Bel Abbès	Relizane
15:00	Aoued 32'	Soccerway report		Stadium: Stade Tahar Zoughari; Attendance: 0 (close doors); Referee: Youcef Gamouh

12 March 2021 Round 17	CS Constantine	5–2	RC Relizane	Constantine
15:00	Lakdja 31', 53'; Lamri 45+1'; Amokrane 65', 83'	Soccerway report	Balegh 3'; Seguer 88'	Stadium: Stade Ramdane Benabdelmalek; Attendance: 0 (close doors); Referee: Lahlou Benbraham

16 March 2021 Round 18	RC Relizane	1–0	Olympique de Médéa	Relizane
15:00	Aoued 90+5'	Soccerway report		Stadium: Stade Tahar Zoughari; Attendance: 0 (close doors); Referee: Abderrezzak Arab

21 March 2021 Round 19	RC Relizane	0–0	ASO Chlef	Tlemcen (Note: RC Relizane played their home match against ASO Chlef at Stade Akid Lotfi, Tlemcen, instead of their regular stadium Stade Tahar Zoughari, Relizane, due to renovation.)
15:00		Soccerway report		Stadium: Stade Akid Lotfi; Attendance: 0 (close doors); Referee: Houssam Benyahia

30 March 2021 Round 14	JS Kabylie	1–0	RC Relizane	Tizi Ouzou
15:00	Raiah 18'	Soccerway report		Stadium: Stade 1er Novembre 1954; Attendance: 0 (close doors); Referee: Youcef Gamouh

4 May 2021 Round 20	Paradou AC	2–0	RC Relizane	Dar El Beïda
16:00	Messibah 47'; Kadri 69'	Soccerway report		Stadium: Omar Benrabah Stadium; Attendance: 0 (close doors); Referee: Lahlou Benbraham

16 May 2021 Round 21	RC Relizane	2–2	ES Sétif	Relizane
16:00	Feham 52' (pen.); Elmenaouer 58'	Soccerway report	Ghacha 7' (pen.), 63'	Stadium: Stade Tahar Zoughari; Attendance: 0 (close doors); Referee: Malek Ait Ameur

22 May 2021 Round 22	JS Saoura	5–1	RC Relizane	Béchar
18:00	Saâd 35'; Messaoudi 76', 87', 89', 90+2'	Soccerway report	Aoued 45+2'	Stadium: Stade 20 Août 1955; Attendance: 0 (close doors); Referee: Bilal Bendjahene

26 May 2021 Round 23	RC Relizane	1–1	CA Bordj Bou Arréridj	Relizane
17:00	Nekrouf 45+2' (pen.)	Soccerway report	Lalaoui 43'	Stadium: Stade Tahar Zoughari; Attendance: 0 (close doors); Referee: Lyés Bekouassa

30 May 2021 Round 24	MC Alger	2–2	RC Relizane	Algiers
19:00	Frioui 37'; Hachoud 45+3'	Soccerway report	Seguer 49'; Gharbi 71'	Stadium: Stade du 5 Juillet; Attendance: 0 (close doors); Referee: Abdelmoumen Touabti

10 June 2021 Round 25	RC Relizane	2–1	MC Oran	Relizane
17:00	Aoued 17'; Feham 45+2'	Soccerway report	Nekkache 86'	Stadium: Stade Tahar Zoughari; Attendance: 0 (close doors); Referee: Youcef Gamouh

19 June 2021 Round 26	US Biskra	3–2	RC Relizane	Biskra
20:00	Harrari 14', 19'; Chibane 56'	Soccerway report	Feham 24' (pen.); Hellal 90+1'	Stadium: Stade du 18 Février; Attendance: 0 (close doors); Referee: Redouane Necib

27 June 2021 Round 27	RC Relizane	2–4	USM Alger	Relizane
17:00	Chadli 34'; Gharbi 62'	Soccerway report	Belkacemi 10'; Zouari 45' (pen.); Opoku 57' (pen.); Koulkheir 80' (o.g.)	Stadium: Stade Tahar Zoughari; Attendance: 0 (close doors); Referee: Bilal Bendjahene

1 July 2021 Round 28	CR Belouizdad	6–1	RC Relizane	Belouizdad
17:00	Keddad 14'; Khalfallah 41', 44'; Merzougui 69', 72', 81'	Soccerway report	Hitala 49'	Stadium: Stade 20 Août 1955; Attendance: 0 (close doors); Referee: Adel Facih

4 July 2021 Round 29	RC Relizane	2–1	AS Aïn M'lila	Relizane
17:30	Balegh 50'; Barkat 90'	Soccerway report	Ziad 48'	Stadium: Stade Tahar Zoughari; Attendance: 0 (close doors); Referee: Amine Hansal

8 July 2021 Round 30	WA Tlemcen	0–1	RC Relizane	Tlemcen
20:30		Soccerway report	Mazari 90+4' (pen.)	Stadium: Stade Akid Lotfi; Attendance: 0 (close doors); Referee: Abdelali Ibrir

13 July 2021 Round 31	RC Relizane	1–0	NC Magra	Relizane
18:00	Seguer 80'	Soccerway report		Stadium: Stade Tahar Zoughari; Attendance: 0 (close doors); Referee: Lotfi Bekouassa

17 July 2021 Round 32	JSM Skikda	0–2	RC Relizane	Skikda
17:45		Soccerway report	Chadli 41'; Seguer 51'	Stadium: Stade 20 Août 1955; Attendance: 0 (close doors); Referee: Nadjib Meziani

23 July 2021 Round 33	RC Relizane	1–0	JS Kabylie	Relizane
18:00	Barka 40'	Soccerway report		Stadium: Stade Tahar Zoughari; Attendance: 0 (close doors); Referee: Said Aouina

27 July 2021 Round 34	RC Relizane	0–0	NA Hussein Dey	Relizane
18:00		Soccerway report		Stadium: Stade Tahar Zoughari; Attendance: 0 (close doors); Referee: Youcef Gamouh

9 August 2021 Round 35	USM Bel Abbès	2–2	RC Relizane	Sidi Bel Abbès
21:00	Hamza 15'; Itim 67'	Soccerway report	Hellal 82'; Mazari 90'	Stadium: Stade 24 Fevrier 1956; Attendance: 0 (close doors); Referee: Hamza Boucetta

16 August 2021 Round 36	RC Relizane	2–1	CS Constantine	Relizane
17:30	Seguer 13'; Elmenaouer 36'	Soccerway report	Bouldjedri 29'	Stadium: Stade Tahar Zoughari; Attendance: 0 (close doors); Referee: Amine Hansal

21 August 2021 Round 37	Olympique de Médéa	1–1	RC Relizane	Médéa
17:30	Lakroum 80'	Soccerway report	Barkat 45+2'	Stadium: Stade Imam Lyes; Attendance: 0 (close doors); Referee: Dakhane

24 August 2021 Round 38	ASO Chlef	2–1	RC Relizane	Chlef
21:00	Bouguettaya 40' (pen.); Bengrina 69'	Soccerway report	Mazari 79'	Stadium: Stade Mohamed Boumezrag; Attendance: 0 (close doors); Referee: Abderrezzak Arab

== Algerian League Cup ==
30 April 2021 Round of 16	RC Relizane	0–1	MC Oran	Relizane
15:30			Mellal 45'	Stadium: Stade Tahar Zoughari; Attendance: 0 (close doors); Referee: Lotfi Bekouassa
Note: Lineup for RC Relizane - Zaidi, Chettih, Bouzid, Mazari, Barka, Koulkheir, Barkat (Hellal, 34') (Ould Hamou, 60'), Aoued, Hitala (Belalia, 60'), Neche (Balegh, 78'), Elmenaouer.

== Squad information ==
=== Playing statistics ===
No.	Pos	Nat	Player	Total		Ligue 1		League Cup	
No.	Pos	Nat	Player	Apps	Goals	Apps	Goals	Apps	Goals
Goalkeepers
	GK	(Algeria) ALG	Mustapha Zaidi	0	0	0	0	0	0
	GK	(Algeria) ALG	Hamza Bousseder	0	0	0	0	0	0
	GK	(Algeria) ALG	Omar Hamou	0	0	0	0	0	0
Defenders
	DF	(Algeria) ALG	Rabah Aich	0	0	0	0	0	0
	DF	(Algeria) ALG	Mohamed El Amine Barka	0	0	0	0	0	0
	DF	(Algeria) ALG	Bouabdellah Chadouli	0	0	0	0	0	0
	DF	(Algeria) ALG	Arslane Mazari	0	0	0	0	0	0
	DF	(Algeria) ALG	Khaled Neche	0	0	0	0	0	0
	DF	(Algeria) ALG	Mohamed Amine Zidane	0	0	0	0	0	0
	DF	(Algeria) ALG	Seif Eddine Chettih	0	0	0	0	0	0
	DF	(Algeria) ALG	Abdelkader Meguenine	0	0	0	0	0	0
Midfielders
	MF	(Algeria) ALG	Aymen Chadli	0	0	0	0	0	0
	MF	(Algeria) ALG	Bouazza Feham	0	0	0	0	0	0
	MF	(Algeria) ALG	Walid Hellal	0	0	0	0	0	0
	MF	(Algeria) ALG	Sabri Gharbi	0	0	0	0	0	0
	MF	(Algeria) ALG	Mohamed Reda Nekrouf	0	0	0	0	0	0
	MF	(Algeria) ALG	Noufel Ould Hamou	0	0	0	0	0	0
	MF	(Algeria) ALG	Fouad Allag	0	0	0	0	0	0
	MF	(Algeria) ALG	Abdelmalek Elmenaouer	0	0	0	0	0	0
	MF	(Algeria) ALG	Youcef Tahirine	0	0	0	0	0	0
	MF	(Algeria) ALG	Younes Koulkheir	0	0	0	0	0	0
Forwards
	FW	(Algeria) ALG	Ramdane Hitala	0	0	0	0	0	0
	FW	(Algeria) ALG	Abdelillah Barkat	0	0	0	0	0	0
	FW	(Algeria) ALG	Houcine Aoued	0	0	0	0	0	0
	FW	(Algeria) ALG	Mohamed Seguer	0	0	0	0	0	0
	FW	(Algeria) ALG	Bilal Bouzid	0	0	0	0	0	0
	FW	(Algeria) ALG	Ahmed Belalia	0	0	0	0	0	0
	FW	(Algeria) ALG	Mehdi Kadri	0	0	0	0	0	0
	FW	(Algeria) ALG	Abou Sofiane Balegh	0	0	0	0	0	0
Players transferred out during the season

Last updated: 2 May 2021

=== Goalscorers ===
Includes all competitive matches. The list is sorted alphabetically by surname when total goals are equal.

== Transfers ==
=== In ===
Date	Pos	Player	From club	Transfer fee	Source
7 October 2020	GK	(Algeria) Hamza Bousseder	US Biskra	Free transfer	
7 October 2020	MF	(Algeria) Mohamed Réda Nekrouf	MC Saïda	Free transfer	
7 October 2020	MF	(Algeria) Mehdi Kadri	MO Béjaïa	Free transfer	
7 October 2020	MF	(Algeria) Younes Koulkheir	USM Bel Abbès	Free transfer	
9 October 2020	MF	(Algeria) Abou Sofiane Balegh	CS Constantine	Free transfer	
20 October 2020	MF	(Algeria) Noufel Ould Hamou	CR Belouizdad	Free transfer	
