= 2023–24 Olympique Akbou season =

Olympique Akbou
2023–24 season
- President: Karim Takka
- Head coach: Moufdi Cherdoud (from 17 June 2023) (until 16 November 2023); Mourad Karouf (from 20 November 2023)
- Stadium: 1 November 1954 Stadium
- Ligue 2: 1st (promoted)
- Algerian Cup: Round of 16
Home colours	Away colours

The 2023–24 season, is Olympique Akbou's 1st season in the second tier of Algerian football. In addition to the domestic league, they also participated Algerian Cup, reaching the round of 16.

On 11 May 2024, Olympique Akbou were promoted for the first time to the Ligue 1.

== Players ==
=== Current squad ===
As of 5 February 2024 Note: Flags indicate national team as defined under FIFA eligibility rules; some limited exceptions apply. Players may hold more than one non-FIFA nationality.

No.	Pos.	Nation	Player
1	GK	ALG	Massinissa Messaoudi
2	DF	ALG	Slimane Bouteldja
4	DF	ALG	Zidane Mebarakou (captain)
5	DF	ALG	Ibrahim Ferhat
6	MF	ALG	Louanes Zidi
7	DF	ALG	Ayache Ziouache
8	MF	ALG	Abdessamad Bounoua
9	FW	ALG	Omar Adrar
10	MF	ALG	Anis Renaï
11	FW	ALG	Abdelkrim Zouari
12	FW	ALG	Hamek Abbes
13	FW	ALG	Mohamed El Seddik Benbourenane
14	FW	ALG	Sid Ali Kabri
15	FW	ALG	Mahfoudh Bellounes

No.	Pos.	Nation	Player
16	GK	ALG	Benaouda Klileche
17	FW	ALG	Elabed Beloufa
20	MF	ALG	Mouloud Mizi Ouallaoua
21	DF	ALG	Younes Abdelhak Ouassa
22	DF	ALG	Abdennour Ardja
23	MF	ALG	Merouane Mehdaoui
24	DF	ALG	Mohamed Yasser Chelfaoui
25	GK	ALG	Aymen Zoukh
26	MF	ALG	Mansour Achour
27	FW	ALG	Sofiane Fouad Lachahab

=== Reserve squad ===
Note: Flags indicate national team as defined under FIFA eligibility rules; some limited exceptions apply. Players may hold more than one non-FIFA nationality.

No.	Pos.	Nation	Player
77	FW	ALG	Amayas Bibi
79	FW	ALG	Mohamed Amine Gherbi

No.	Pos.	Nation	Player
80	FW	ALG	Abdelhak Hathat
90	MF	ALG	Massinissa Benamara

== Competitions ==
=== Overview ===
Competition	Record								Started round	Final position / round	First match	Last match
Competition	G	W	D	L	GF	GA	GD	Win %	Started round	Final position / round	First match	Last match
Ligue 2	30	22	4	4	59	19	+40	73.33	—N/a	Winners	29 September 2023	31 May 2024
Algerian Cup	5	4	0	1	8	2	+6	80.00	Round of 64	Round of 16	12 December 2023	29 March 2024
Total	35	26	4	5	67	21	+46	74.29				

Updated to match played 31 May 2024
Source: Competitions

=== League table ===
Pos	Team	Pld	W	D	L	GF	GA	GD	Pts	Promotion or relegation
1	Olympique Akbou (C, P)	30	22	4	4	59	19	+40	70	Ligue 1
2	MSP Batna	30	18	7	5	46	22	+24	61	
3	JS Bordj Ménaïel	30	12	9	9	33	27	+6	45	
4	CA Batna	30	10	13	7	26	22	+4	43	
5	MO Constantine	30	11	9	10	32	36	−4	42	
6	IB Khémis El Khechna	30	11	8	11	28	26	+2	41	
7	USM El Harrach	30	12	5	13	35	34	+1	41	
8	IRB Ouargla	30	11	8	11	23	32	−9	41	
9	HB Chelghoum Laïd	30	11	6	13	33	32	+1	39	
10	Olympique Magrane	30	11	6	13	28	37	−9	39	
11	AS Khroub	30	9	11	10	35	27	+8	38	
12	USM Annaba	30	8	14	8	33	28	+5	38	
13	NRB Teleghma	30	12	2	16	41	41	0	38	
14	AS Aïn M'lila (R)	30	10	7	13	28	34	−6	37	Relegation to Inter-Régions
15	E Sour El Ghozlane (R)	30	7	8	15	27	49	−22	29	Relegation to Inter-Régions
16	MC El Eulma (R)	30	3	7	20	16	57	−41	16	Relegation to Inter-Régions

Updated to match(es) played on 1 June 2024. Source: lnf-amateur.dz
Rules for classification: 1) points; 2) head-to-head points; 3) head-to-head goal difference; 4) goal difference; 5) total goals; 6) fairplay ranking; 7) playoff.
(C) Champions; (P) Promoted; (R) Relegated

==== Results summary ====
Overall								Home						Away					
Pld	W	D	L	GF	GA	GD	Pts	W	D	L	GF	GA	GD	W	D	L	GF	GA	GD
30	22	4	4	59	19	+40	70	13	2	0	36	5	+31	9	2	4	23	14	+9

Last updated: 31 May 2024.
Source: Competitive matches

==== Results by round ====
Round	1	2	3	4	5	6	7	8	9	10	11	12	13	14	15	16	17	18	19	20	21	22	23	24	25	26	27	28	29	30
Ground	A	H	A	H	A	H	A	H	A	H	A	H	A	H	A	H	A	H	A	H	A	H	A	H	A	H	A	H	A	H
Result	L	W	W	D	W	W	W	W	W	W	W	D	W	W	W	W	D	W	W	W	W	W	D	W	L	W	L	W	L	W
Position	16	5	3	3	2	2	1	1	1	1	1	1	1	1	1	1	1	1	1	1	1	1	1	1	1	1	1	1	1	1

Updated to match(es) played on 31 May 2024. Source:
A = Away; H = Home; W = Win; D = Draw; L = Loss

==== Matches ====
29 September 2023 1	CA Batna	3–0	O Akbou	Batna
15:00	Guezair 47'; Kerkoud; Issead	Report		Stadium: 1 November 1954 Stadium

7 October 2023 2	O Akbou	5–0	USM Annaba	Akbou
15:00	Mehdaoui 48'; Boulaouidet 51', 55'; Bellounes 39', 87'	Report	Toumi (yellow card) 54'	Stadium: 1 November 1954 Stadium

14 October 2023 3	O Magrane	1–4	O Akbou	El Oued
15:00	Abbad 45'	Report	Mizi 22'; Bellounes 15' 47'; Boulaouidet 88'	Stadium: 1 November 1954 Stadium

10 November 2023 4	O Akbou	1–1	JS Bordj Ménaïel	Akbou
15:00	Bounoua 60' (pen.)	Report	Bouzidi 65'	Stadium: 1 November 1954 Stadium; Attendance: 0

18 November 2023 5	MC El Eulma	1–2	O Akbou	Sétif
15:00	Aib 34'	Report	Benbourenane 44'; Boulaouidat 69'	Stadium: 8 May 1945 Stadium

24 November 2023 6	O Akbou	2–1	MO Constantine	Akbou
15:00				Stadium: 1 November 1954 Stadium

2 December 2023 7	IRB Ouargla	0–1	O Akbou	Ouargla
15:00				Stadium: 13 February Stadium

8 December 2023 8	O Akbou	1–0	MSP Batna	Akbou
15:00				Stadium: 1 November 1954 Stadium

30 December 2023 9	USM El Harrach	1–4	O Akbou	El Harrach
15:00				Stadium: 1 November 1954 Stadium

5 January 2024 10	O Akbou	3–1	AS Aïn M'lila	Akbou
15:00				Stadium: 1 November 1954 Stadium

12 January 2024 11	NRB Teleghma	1–2	O Akbou	Teleghma
15:00				Stadium: Bachir Khabaza Stadium

16 January 2024 12	O Akbou	0–0	AS Khroub	Akbou
15:00		Report		Stadium: 1 November 1954 Stadium

21 January 2024 13	E Sour El Ghozlane	2–3	O Akbou	Sour El-Ghozlane
15:00				Stadium: Mohamed Derradji Stadium

24 January 2024 14	O Akbou	2–0	HB Chelghoum Laïd	Akbou
15:00				Stadium: 1 November 1954 Stadium

28 January 2024 15	IB Khemis El Khechna	0–1	O Akbou	Khemis El Khechna
15:00				Stadium: Abdelkader Zerrouki Stadium

24 February 2024 17	USM Annaba	0–0	O Akbou	Annaba
15:00				Stadium: Abdelkader Chabou Stadium

1 March 2024 18	O Akbou	3–0	Olympique Magrane	Akbou
15:00				Stadium: 1 November 1954 Stadium

5 March 2024 16	O Akbou	2–0	CA Batna	Akbou
15:00				Stadium: 1 November 1954 Stadium
Note: The game was initially scheduled to take place on 17 February 2024, but was postponed.

16 March 2024 19	JS Bordj Menaiel	0–2	O Akbou	Boumerdès
15:00				Stadium: Djilali Bounaama Stadium

23 March 2024 20	O Akbou	4–1	MC El Eulma	Akbou
15:00				Stadium: 1 November 1954 Stadium

5 April 2024 21	MO Constantine	0–2	O Akbou	Constantine
15:00				Stadium: Ramadane Ben Abdelmalek Stadium

15 April 2024 22	O Akbou	4–0	IRB Ouargla	Akbou
15:00				Stadium: 1 November 1954 Stadium

19 April 2024 23	MSP Batna	0–0	O Akbou	Batna
15:00				Stadium: 1 November 1954 Stadium

27 April 2024 24	O Akbou	2–0	USM El Harrach	Akbou
15:00				Stadium: 1 November 1954 Stadium

4 May 2024 25	AS Aïn M'lila	1–0	O Akbou	Aïn M'lila
15:00				Stadium: Touhami Zoubir Khelifi Stadium

11 May 2024 26	O Akbou	1–0	NRB Teleghma	Akbou
15:00	Adrar 47'	Report		Stadium: 1 November 1954 Stadium

18 May 2024 27	AS Khroub	1–0	O Akbou	El Khroub
15:00	Menacer 20' (pen.)	Report		Stadium: Abed Hamdani Stadium

24 May 2024 28	O Akbou	3–0	E Sour El Ghozlane	Akbou
16:00	Mebarakou 60'; Hathat 80' (yellow card); Benbourenane 88'	Report	Touati (yellow card); Kaciri (yellow card)	Stadium: 1 November 1954 Stadium

28 May 2024 29	HB Chelghoum Laïd	3–2	O Akbou	Chelghoum Laïd
16:00	45'; 86'; 90+14'	Report	Hathat 32'; Mohamed El Seddik Benbourenane 35'	Stadium: 11 December 1961 Stadium

31 May 2024 30	O Akbou	3–1	IB Khemis El Khechna	Akbou
16:00				Stadium: 1 November 1954 Stadium

=== Algerian Cup ===
==== Matches ====
12 December 2023 4th round	O Akbou	2–0	JS Bordj Ménaïel	Dar El Beïda
14:00	Lachahab 45' (pen.) 72'; Zidi (yellow card); Gherbi (yellow card)	Report	Ait Idir (yellow card); Bahi (yellow card) 30'	Stadium: Omar Benrabah Stadium

16 December 2023 5th round	O Akbou	3–1	RC Kouba	Tizi-Ouzou
14:00	Beloufa 45'; Benbourenane 80'; Boulaouidat 83'; Zoukh (yellow card); Bouteldja (yellow card) 72'	Report	Hamani 85'; Derai (yellow card) 45+2'	Stadium: 1 November 1954 Stadium

2 February 2024 Round of 64	CRB Beni Tamou	0–1	O Akbou	Blida
14:30		Report	Hamek 38' (pen.)	Stadium: Brakni Brothers Stadium; Referee: Tahar Boudjemaa

9 March 2024 Round of 32	O Akbou	2–0	SC Mécheria	Akbou
14:30	Adrar 17'; Mizi 25'	Report		Stadium: 1 November 1954 Stadium; Referee: Mohamed Amine Benzohra

29 March 2024 Round of 16	CR Belouizdad	2–0	O Akbou	Algiers
22:00	Meziane 73'; Benguit 78'	Report		Stadium: Stade du 5 Juillet; Referee: Mustapha Ghorbal
