= Hamza Belahouel =

Algerian footballer (born 1993)

Personal information
- Full name: Hamza Belahouel
- Date of birth: June 8, 1993 (age 33)
- Place of birth: Mostaganem, Algeria
- Height: 1.70 m (5 ft 7 in)
- Position: Forward

Senior career*
Years	Team	Apps	(Gls)
2013–2014	ES Mostaganem	7	(1)
2014–2015	WA Tlemcen	26	(2)
2016–2017	ES Mostaganem		
2017–2019	USM Bel Abbès	39	(5)
2019–2021	CR Belouizdad	30	(16)
2021–2022	CS Constantine	23	(3)
2022–2023	MC Oran	13	(0)
- * Club domestic league appearances and goals as of 31 January 2024

Hamza Belahouel (Arabic: حمزة بلحول; born June 8, 1993, in Mostaganem) is an Algerian footballer.

== Career ==
On May 1, 2018, Belahouel scored two goals in USM Bel-Abbès' 2–1 win over JS Kabylie in the 2018 Algerian Cup Final. In 2019, He signed a contract with CR Belouizdad. In 2021, he joined CS Constantine. In 2022, he joined MC Oran.

== Honours ==
USM Bel-Abbès

- Algerian Cup (1): 2018
