= Sofiane Bengorine =

Algerian footballer (born 1984)

Personal information
- Date of birth: 10 October 1984 (age 42)
- Place of birth: Sidi Bel Abbès, Algeria
- Height: 1.76 m (5 ft 9 in)
- Position: Defender

Senior career*
Years	Team	Apps	(Gls)
2004–2006	USM Bel-Abbès		
2006–2007	ASM Oran		
2007–2008	JS Kabylie		
2008–2012	MC Oran		
2012	ES Sétif		
2012–2013	USM Annaba		
2013–2018	USM Bel-Abbès		
- * Club domestic league appearances and goals

Sofiane Bengorine (Note: Sofiane Bengorine at Soccerway (archived)) or Bengoreine (Note: Sofiane Bengorine at WorldFootball.net) (Arabic: سفيان بنغورين; born 10 October 1984) is an Algerian former professional footballer who played as a defender.

== Honours ==
USM Bel Abbès

- Algerian Cup: 2018
