= Farès Benabderahmane =

Algerian footballer (born 1987)

Personal information
- Full name: Farès Benabderahmane
- Date of birth: August 11, 1987 (age 39)
- Place of birth: Sidi Aïssa, Algeria
- Height: 1.88 m (6 ft 2 in)
- Position: Defender

Team information
- Current team: RC Kouba
- Number: 23

Senior career*
Years	Team	Apps	(Gls)
2006–2008	ASO Chlef	-	(-)
2008	NA Hussein Dey	-	(-)
2008–2011	USM El Harrach	-	(-)
2011–2012	CR Belouizdad	22	(1)
2012–2014	ES Sétif	37	(1)
2014–2015	NA Hussein Dey	7	(0)
2015–2016	RC Relizane	27	(2)
2016–2018	USM Bel-Abbès	15	(2)
2018–2020	USM El Harrach		
2020–2021	SKAF Khemis Miliana		
2021–2023	CR Témouchent		
2023–	RC Kouba		
- * Club domestic league appearances and goals as of 29 September 2023

Farès Benabderahmane (born August 11, 1987) is an Algerian football player. He currently plays for RC Kouba in the Algerian Ligue 2.

== Club career ==
On July 12, 2011, Benabderahmane signed a two-year contract with CR Belouizdad.

== Honours ==
=== Club ===
USM El Harrach

- Algerian Cup: Runners-up 2011

USM Bel Abbès

- Algerian Cup: 2018
