= Abou Sofiane Balegh =

Algerian footballer

Sofiane Balegh
Personal information
- Full name: Abou Sofiane Balegh
- Date of birth: 17 August 1988 (age 38)
- Place of birth: Oran, Algeria
- Position: Forward

Team information
- Current team: ASM Oran
- Number: 7

Youth career
- 2000–2007: ASM Oran
- 2007–2008: MC Oran

Senior career*
Years	Team	Apps	(Gls)
2008–2010	MC Oran	18	(2)
2010–2011	USM Annaba	16	(1)
2011–2014	ASM Oran	–	(–)
2014–2015	CR Belouizdad	18	(1)
2015–2017	USM Bel-Abbès	27	(10)
2017–2018	MC Alger	24	(3)
2018–2019	CR Belouizdad	28	(2)
2019–2020	CS Constantine	10	(1)
2020–2022	RC Relizane	55	(26)
2022–2023	MC El Bayadh	23	(2)
2023–2024	ASM Oran		
2024–2025	IRB El Kerma	0	(0)
2025–	ASM Oran	9	(0)
- * Club domestic league appearances and goals as of 14 November 2025

Abou Sofiane Balegh (Arabic: أبو سفيان بالغ; born 22 March 1987) is an Algerian footballer who plays for ASM Oran.
