= Abdelkrim Zouari =

Algerian footballer (born 1989)

Personal information
- Full name: Abdelkrim Zouari
- Date of birth: 14 July 1989 (age 37)
- Place of birth: Saïda, Algeria
- Height: 1.67 m (5 ft 5 1/2 in)
- Position: Left winger

Team information
- Current team: MC Saïda
- Number: 10

Youth career
- –2010: MC Saïda

Senior career*
Years	Team	Apps	(Gls)
2010–2011	Hydra AC		
2011–2012	JSM Chéraga		
2012–2013	O Médéa		
2013–2014	JSM Tiaret		
2014–2015	ESM Koléa	27	(1)
2015–2017	MC Saïda	40	(9)
2017–2018	USM Bel Abbès	54	(10)
2019–2023	USM Alger	99	(21)
2024	Olympique Akbou	13	(3)
2024–2025	RC Kouba		
2025–2026	USM El Harrach	9	(2)
2026–	MC Saïda	0	(0)

International career^{‡}
2018	Algeria	1	(0)
- * Club domestic league appearances and goals as of 14 September 2026 ‡ National team caps and goals as of 9 May 2018

Abdelkrim Zouari (Arabic: عبد الكريم زواري;Tamazight: ⴰⴱⴷⴻⵍⴽⵔⵉⵎ ⵣⵓⴰⵔⵉ; born 14 July 1989) is an Algerian professional footballer who plays as a left winger for MC Saïda.

== Club career ==
On 4 December 2018, He joined USM Alger. On 26 January 2024, He joined Olympique Akbou.

== International career ==
Abdelkrim Zouari made his senior debut with the Algeria national football team in a friendly 2–0 loss to Saudi Arabia on 9 May 2018.

== Career statistics ==
=== Club ===
As of 10 June 2023

Club	Season	League			Cup		Continental		Other		Total	
Club	Season	Division	Apps	Goals	Apps	Goals	Apps	Goals	Apps	Goals	Apps	Goals
USM Bel Abbès	2016–17	Ligue 1	12	4	2	2	—		—		14	6
USM Bel Abbès	2017–18	Ligue 1	27	5	6	1	—		—		33	6
USM Bel Abbès	2018–19	Ligue 1	14	1	—		1 (Note: All appearance(s) in CAF Confederation Cup)	0	1 (Note: All appearances in Algerian Super Cup)	0	16	1
USM Bel Abbès	Total		53	10	8	3	1	0	1	0	63	13
USM Alger	2018–19	Ligue 1	13	4	1	0	—		—		14	4
USM Alger	2019–20	Ligue 1	20	7	—		7 (Note: All appearance(s) in CAF Champions League)	1	—		27	8
USM Alger	2020–21	Ligue 1	28	7	—		—		3 (Note: One appearance in Algerian Super Cup, two appearances in Algerian League Cup)	0	31	7
USM Alger	2021–22	Ligue 1	21	2	—		—		—		21	2
USM Alger	2022–23	Ligue 1	10	1	—		7	0	—		17	1
USM Alger	Total		92	21	1	0	14	1	3	0	110	22
Career total			145	31	9	3	15	1	4	0	173	35

== Honours ==
=== Clubs ===
USM Bel Abbès

- Algerian Cup: 2018
- Algerian Super Cup: 2018

USM Alger

- Algerian Ligue Professionnelle 1: 2018–19
- CAF Confederation Cup: 2022–23

Olympique Akbou

- Algerian Ligue 2: 2023–24 (Center-East Group)
