= Abdennour Belhocini =

Algerian footballer (born 1996)

Personal information
- Full name: Abdennour Iheb Belhocini
- Date of birth: 18 August 1996 (age 30)
- Place of birth: Sidi Bel Abbès, Algeria
- Height: 1.83 m (6 ft 0 in)
- Position: Forward

Team information
- Current team: JS Kabylie
- Number: 21

Youth career
- –2017: USM Bel Abbès

Senior career*
Years	Team	Apps	(Gls)
2017–2020	USM Bel Abbès	53	(16)
2020–2021	Umm Salal	8	(1)
2021	Al-Wakrah	3	(0)
2021–2023	Club Africain	15	(0)
2023–2025	CS Constantine	43	(12)
2025–2026	CR Belouizdad	22	(3)
2026–	JS Kabylie	6	(3)

International career^{‡}
2025	Algeria A'	8	(1)
- * Club domestic league appearances and goals as of 20:19, 19 November 2026 (UTC) ‡ National team caps and goals as of 23 August 2025

Abdennour Iheb Belhocini (Arabic: عبد النور إهاب بلحوسيني; Tamazight: ⴰⴱⴷⴻⵏⵓⵔ ⵉⵀⴻⴱ ⴱⴻⵍⵀⵓⵙⵉⵏⵉ; born 18 August 1996) is an Algerian professional footballer who plays as a forward for JS Kabylie.

== Club career ==
On 27 September 2020, Belhocini joined the Qatari club Umm Salal. On 21 January 2021, he joined another Qatari club which is Al-Wakrah. On 28 August 2021, Belhocini joined the Tunisian club Club Africain. In August 2023, he returned to Algeria signing for CS Constantine. On 31 July 2025, he joined CR Belouizdad. On 30 July 2026, he signed a three-year contract with JS Kabylie.

== Career statistics ==
=== International ===
As of match played 23 August 2025

Appearances and goals by national team and year
National team	Year	Apps	Goals
Algeria A'	2025	8	1
Total		8	1

Scores and results list Algeria's goal tally first, score column indicates score after each Belhocini goal.

List of international goals scored by Abdennour Belhocini
No.	Date	Venue	Opponent	Score	Result	Competition
1	8 August 2025	Mandela National Stadium, Kampala, Uganda	South Africa	1–0	1–1	2024 African Nations Championship
