= Nabil Lamara =

Algerian professional footballer (b. 1993)

Personal information
- Full name: Nabil Lamara
- Date of birth: August 15, 1993 (age 33)
- Place of birth: Algiers, Algeria
- Height: 1.89 m (6 ft 2 in)
- Position: Left back

Team information
- Current team: USM Khenchela
- Number: 3

Senior career*
Years	Team	Apps	(Gls)
2012–2016	RC Kouba		
2016–2017	O Médéa	21	(1)
2017–2019	USM Bel Abbès	28	(0)
2019–2021	MC Alger	50	(9)
2021–2023	Club Africain	16	(0)
2023–2025	USM Alger	31	(0)
2026–	USM Khenchela	2	(0)
- * Club domestic league appearances and goals as of 5 June 2026

Nabil Lamara (Arabic: نبيل لعمارة; born August 15, 1993) is an Algerian footballer who plays as a defender for USM Khenchela.

== Career ==
In January 2019, he signed a contract with MC Alger. In August 2021, he joined Club Africain. In July 2023, he joined USM Alger. On 31 January 2026, he signed for USM Khenchela.

== Honours ==
USM Alger

- Algerian Cup: 2024–25
- CAF Super Cup: 2023
