= Nadjib Ghoul =

Algerian footballer (born 1985)

Personal information
- Full name: Nadjib Ghoul
- Date of birth: September 12, 1985 (age 41)
- Place of birth: El Harrach, Algiers, Algeria
- Position: Goalkeeper

Team information
- Current team: USM El Harrach
- Number: 1

Senior career*
Years	Team	Apps	(Gls)
2005–2009	USM El Harrach	-	(-)
2009–2010	USM Alger	2	(0)
2010–2011	CR Belouizdad	2	(0)
2011–2012	NA Hussein Dey	14	(0)
2012–2014	ES Sétif	7	(0)
2014–2015	CS Constantine	12	(0)
2016–2020	USM Bel-Abbès	8	(0)
2020–	USM El Harrach	0	(0)

International career
2002	Algeria U17	-	(-)
2003	Algeria U20	-	(-)
2007	Algeria U23	-	(-)
- * Club domestic league appearances and goals as of 00:00, 02 April 2017 (UTC)

Nadjib Ghoul (born September 12, 1985) is an Algerian football player. He currently plays for USM El Harrach in the Algerian Ligue 2.

== Club career ==
On August 7, 2011, Ghoul signed a two-year contract with NA Hussein Dey.
