= Larbi Tabti =

Algerian footballer (born 1993)

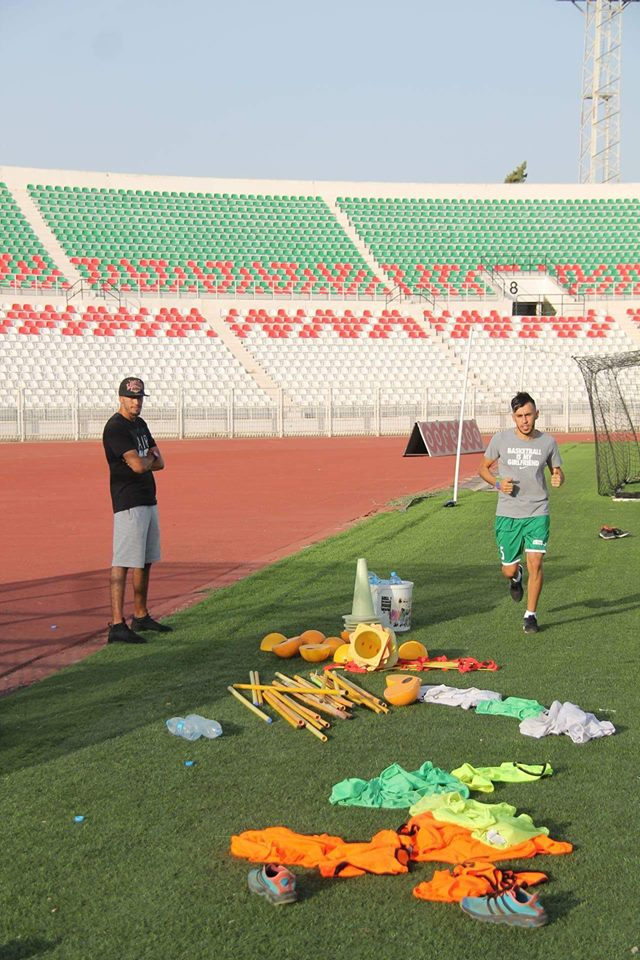

Personal information
- Date of birth: 23 April 1993 (age 33)
- Place of birth: Oran, Algeria
- Height: 1.71 m (5 ft 7 in)
- Position: Midfielder

Team information
- Current team: ES Sétif
- Number: 10

Youth career
- –2014: ASM Oran

Senior career*
Years	Team	Apps	(Gls)
2014–2016	ASM Oran	55	(2)
2016–2019	USM Bel Abbès	65	(7)
2019–2022	CR Belouizdad	50	(3)
2022–2023	ES Sétif	20	(1)
2024–2026	MC Alger	61	(3)
2026–	ES Sétif	0	(0)
- * Club domestic league appearances and goals as of 15 June 2026

Larbi Tabti (born 23 April 1993, in Oran) is an Algerian footballer who plays as a midfielder for ES Sétif.

== Career ==
In 2019, he signed a contract with CR Belouizdad. In 2022, he signed a contract with ES Sétif. On 4 February 2024, he joined MC Alger. On 15 June 2026, he joined ES Sétif.

== Honours ==
=== Club ===
USM Bel Abbès

- Algerian Cup: 2018

MC Alger

- Algerian Ligue 1: 2024-25
