= 24 February Stadium =

Sports venue in Sidi Bel Abbès, Algeria

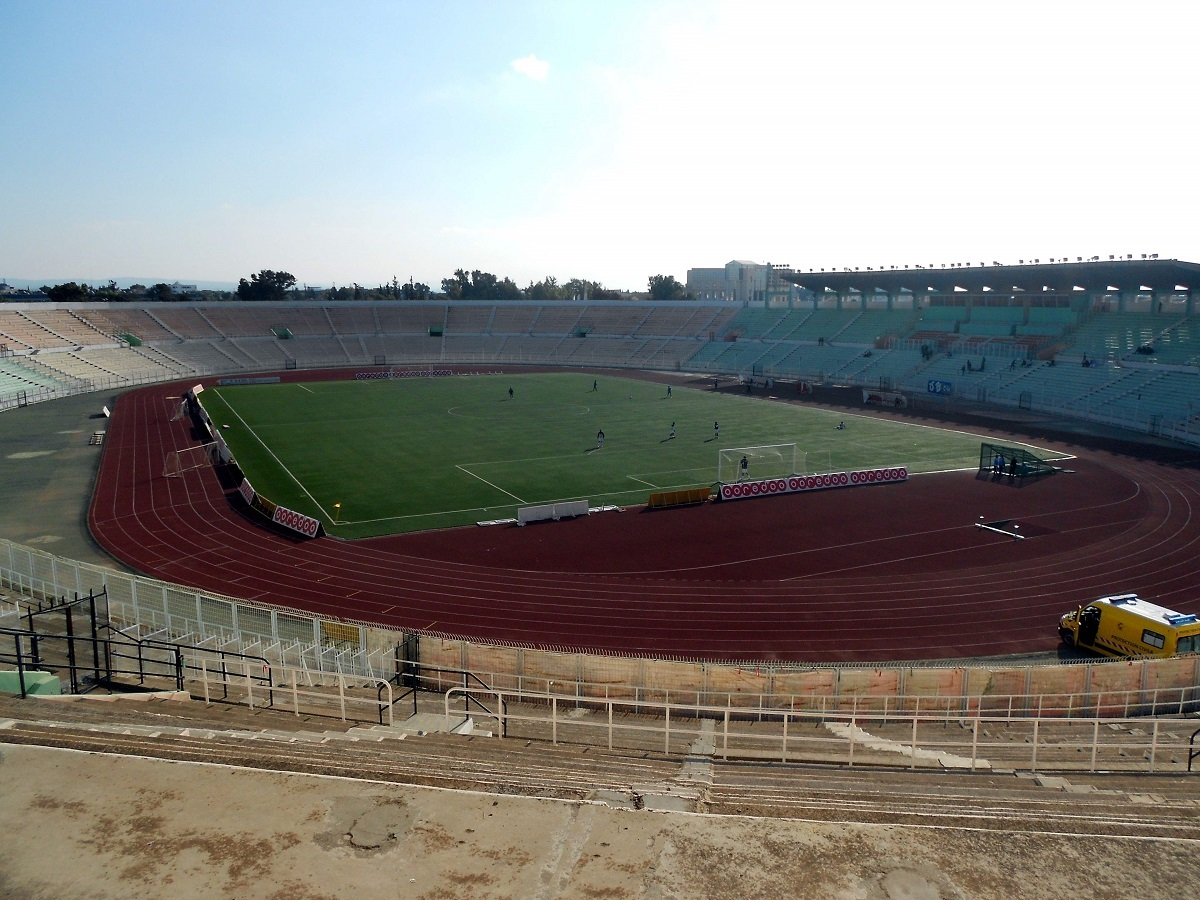
- Interactive map of 24 February Stadium
- Full name: 24 February 1956 Stadium
- Location: Route de Mascara SBA; Sidi Bel Abbès, Algeria
- Coordinates: 35°11′06.1″N 0°37′19.7″W
- Owner: OPOW de Sidi Bel Abbès
- Capacity: 45,000
- Surface: Artificial turf

Construction
- Opened: 19 June 1981

Tenant
- USM Bel Abbès

24 February 1956 Stadium (Arabic: ملعب 24 فبراير 1956, French: Stade du 24 février) is a multi-use stadium in Sidi Bel Abbès, Algeria. It is currently used mostly for football matches and is the home ground of USM Bel Abbès. The stadium holds 45,000 spectators.

== History ==
The stadium was open on 19 June 1981 and it hosted the final match of the Algerian cup 1980-81 between ASC Oran and USK Alger. It replaced the historical stadium in the city of Sidi Bel Abbès, "The Three Amarouch Brothers Stadium" (Stade des Trois Frères Amarouch).

== Matches ==
=== 1980-81 Algerian Cup ===
Date	Time (CET)	Team #1	Result	Team #2	Round	Spectators
19 June 1981	-:-	USK Alger	2–1	ASC Oran	Final	

=== 1985 Palestine Cup of Nations for Youth ===
Date	Time (CET)	Team #1	Result	Team #2	Round	Spectators
17 September 1985	-:-	Saudi Arabia (Y.)	0–0	South Yemen (Y.)	1st GS	
19 September 1985	-:-	Tunisia (Y.)	2–1	South Yemen (Y.)	1st GS	
21 September 1985	-:-	Saudi Arabia (Y.)	2–0	Tunisia (Y.)	1st GS	

=== 1986 International friendly ===
Date	Time (CET)	Team #1	Result	Team #2	Round	Spectators
22 January 1986	-:-	Algeria	0–0	PSV Eindhoven	One match	
