= Zakaria Khali =

Algerian footballer (born 1990)

Personal information
- Date of birth: 10 May 1990 (age 36)
- Place of birth: Sidi Bel Abbès, Algeria
- Position: Defender

Team information
- Current team: CR Témouchent
- Number: 19

Senior career*
Years	Team	Apps	(Gls)
2012–2019	USM Bel-Abbès	113	(8)
2019–2021	CR Belouizdad	24	(2)
2021–2023	MC Oran	46	(0)
2023–	CR Témouchent	0	(0)
- * Club domestic league appearances and goals as of 10 August 2023

Zakaria Khali (Arabic: زكرياء خالي; born 10 May 1990) is an Algerian footballer who plays for CR Témouchent as a defender.

== Career ==
In 2019, he joined CR Belouizdad. In 2021, he joined MC Oran. In 2023, he joined CR Témouchent.

== Honours ==
=== Club ===
USM Bel Abbès

- Algerian Cup: 2017–18

CR Belouizdad

- Algerian Ligue Professionnelle 1: 2019-20, 2020-21
- Algerian Super Cup: 2019
