= Athmane Toual =

Algerian footballer (born 1984)

Personal information
- Full name: Athmane Toual
- Date of birth: 17 July 1984 (age 42)
- Place of birth: Hussein Dey, Algeria
- Height: 1.83 m (6 ft 0 in)
- Position: Goalkeeper

Youth career
- –2003: NA Hussein Dey

Senior career*
Years	Team	Apps	(Gls)
2003–2006	NA Hussein Dey		(0)
2006–2007	JSM Skikda		(0)
2007–2009	NA Hussein Dey		(0)
2009–2010	MO Constantine		(0)
2010–2012	MC Mekhadma		(0)
2012–2013	MO Béjaïa		(0)
2013–2014	AS Khroub	22	(0)
2014–2015	ESM Koléa	13	(0)
2015–2018	USM Bel Abbès	36	(0)
2018–2019	MO Béjaïa	22	(0)
2019–2020	MC Alger	5	(0)
2020–2021	SKAF Khemis Miliana		(0)
2021–2024	MC Oran	8	(0)
- * Club domestic league appearances and goals as of 31 January 2024

Athmane Toual (Arabic: عثمان طوال; born 17 July 1984) is an Algerian former footballer.

== Career ==
In July 2018, he signed for MO Béjaïa. In July 2019, he joined MC Alger. In October 2020, he signed for SKAF Khemis Miliana. In March 2021, he joined MC Oran. On 2 February 2024, He was released by MC Oran.

== Honours ==
=== Clubs ===
USM Bel Abbès

- Algerian Cup (1): 2017–18
