= El Habib Bouguelmouna =

Algerian footballer (born 1988)

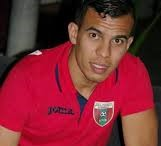

Personal information
- Date of birth: 12 December 1988 (age 37)
- Place of birth: Relizane
- Height: 1.85 m (6 ft 1 in)
- Position: Forward

Team information
- Current team: ES Sétif
- Number: 9

Youth career
- RC Relizane
- Paradou AC

Senior career*
Years	Team	Apps	(Gls)
2005–2011	Paradou AC	–	(–)
2011–2012	RC Relizane	–	(–)
2012–2013	USM El Harrach	–	(–)
2013–2014	JS Saoura	16	(3)
2014–2016	CA Bordj Bou Arréridj	–	(–)
2016–2018	USM Bel Abbès	45	(13)
2018–	ES Sétif	0	(0)

International career
2018–	Algeria	1	(0)
- * Club domestic league appearances and goals as of 19 July 2018

El Habib Bouguelmouna (born 12 December 1988) is an Algerian footballer who plays for ES Sétif as a forward.

== International career ==
Bouguelmouna made his senior debut with the Algeria national football team in a friendly 2–0 loss to Saudi Arabia on 9 May 2018.

== Honours ==
=== Club ===
USM Bel Abbès

- Algerian Cup: 2018
