= Abdessamad Bounoua =

Algerian footballer (born 1991)

Personal information
- Full name: Abdessamad Bounoua
- Date of birth: 24 April 1991 (age 35)
- Place of birth: Sidi Bel Abbès, Algeria
- Height: 1.70 m (5 ft 7 in)
- Position: Central midfielder

Youth career
- –2011: USM Bel Abbès

Senior career*
Years	Team	Apps	(Gls)
2011–2019	USM Bel Abbès	170	(7)
2019–2021	JS Kabylie	24	(2)
2021–2022	MC Oran	45	(0)
2023	Al-Sadd		
2023–2024	Olympique Akbou	20	(3)
- * Club domestic league appearances and goals as of 1 August 2024

Abdessamad Bounoua (Arabic: عبد الصمد بونوة; Tamazight: ⴰⴱⴷⴻⵙⵙⴰⵎⴰⴷ ⴱⵓⵏⵓⴰ; born 24 April 1991) is an Algerian professional footballer who plays as a central midfielder.

== Honours ==
=== Clubs ===
USM Bel Abbès

- Algerian Cup: 2017–18
- Algerian Super Cup: 2018
- Algerian Ligue 2: 2013–14

Olympique Akbou

- Algerian Ligue 2: 2023–24 (Center-East Group)
