= 2021–22 USM Alger season =

USM Alger
2021–22 season
- Owner: Groupe SERPORT
- President: Achour Djelloul (until 13 May 2022); Abdelkarim Harkati (from 13 May 2022)
- Head coach: Denis Lavagne (from 25 August 2021) (until 24 December 2021); Azzedine Rahim (c) (from 24 December 2021) (until 9 February 2022); Zlatko Krmpotić (from 9 February 2022) (until 18 April 2022); Jamil Benouahi (c) (from 18 April 2022) (until 17 June 2022)
- Stadium: Omar Hamadi Stadium
- Ligue 1: 4th
- Top goalscorer: League: Aymen Mahious; Ismail Belkacemi (8 goals); All: Aymen Mahious; Ismail Belkacemi (8 goals)
- Biggest win: 4–0 vs RC Arbaâ (H) (30 October 2021) vs Olympique de Médéa (H) (3 June 2022); Ligue 1
- Biggest defeat: 1–3 vs ES Sétif (A) (17 June 2022); Ligue 1
Home colours	Away colours

In the 2021–22 season, USM Alger was competing in the Ligue 1 for the 44th season. It was their 27th consecutive season in the top flight of Algerian football. They competed in Ligue 1.

== Season summary ==
Achour Djelloul spoke on Channel 3, made some revelations about recruitment and departures. While affirming that USM Alger will play the leading roles next season, Djelloul reveals that Denis Lavagne will be the new coach of Soustara's. also said that he would like to keep Mounir Zeghdoud with the team as an assistant, while Mohamed Lamine Zemmamouche who is at the end of his career, said we will prepare him to be a goalkeeper coach in the future. Returning to Antar Yahia case, it is first and foremost the relationship between an employer and an employee. Add to that Yahia was punished twice by the Disciplinary Committee, and for this we preferred to separate ourselves from this employee. The club's first deals were goalkeeper Oussama Benbot then contracted with ES Sétif duo Messala Merbah and Ibrahim Bekakchi, The fourth deal was the former player Abderrahmane Meziane coming from Espérance de Tunis and after great negotiations about the salary, they agreed for 260 million per month for two seasons.

On 1 September, USM Alger signed with the former player Hocine Achiou to be the new sporting director and Azzedine Rahim was appointed as assistant to Lavagne and Lounès Gaouaoui as goalkeepers coach. On 10 September, Saadi Yacef died at the age of 93, who was one of the leaders of Algeria's National Liberation Front during his country's war of independence, president of the club in the seventies and honorary president. On 14 September, team captain Mohamed Lamine Zemmamouche renewed his contract for two seasons and is considered the most player who played in the history of the club, with 400 games in sixteen seasons, and stated that he wanted to retire here. The first preparatory will be in Mostaganem for a ten-day internship like last season from September 19 to 28, is a very important step in the preparation for the offseason and include two friendly matches. On 18 October, Pr. Riyad Mehiaoui, member of the scientific committee monitoring the evolution of the COVID-19 pandemic in Algeria, said his organization was in favor of the return of supporters to the stadiums, 19 months after their absence. On 20 October, Hocine Achiou sighed with relief after Mazire Soula finally terminated his contract with USMA. Since the squad has 27 players, management can qualify all new recruits the Franco-Algerian striker refused to leave. After several rounds of negotiation, Achiou and the player failed to agree on an amicable separation. The latter demanded first, compensation that covers the remainder of his lease, which expires on September 28, 2023, in order to sign the termination of his contract.

Denis Lavagne stated that he has 40 years in the world of professionalism, but he has never seen a club start preparations and recruitment with a sports director who does not have a contract (Tewfik Korichi), to leave after one month to appoint another person in his place (Hocine Achiou), who does not have any experience or competence because he does not have any certificate or qualifications He came to revolutionize the team, touching everything, thinking that he knows everything about football.

— Denis Lavagne a statement after leaving the club.

On October 23, USM Alger opened the season against NA Hussein Dey outside the home and tied 1–1. USMA opened the scoring through Abderrahim Hamra in the 42nd minute, and before that Ismail Belkacemi missed a penalty kick. On the 30th of the same month, in the first match at Omar Hamadi Stadium, the fans of Ouled EL Bahdja raised a banner to honor Saadi Yacef, who died about two months ago. USM Alger achieved a great victory against RC Arbaâ by four goals scored by Belkacemi, Mahious, Zouari and Belaïd. The visiting team played with a squad of reserve players, which Hocine Achiou did not like it. On November 20, against the leader US Biskra they won by three including a brace from Benhammouda, US Biskra was forced to play with the reserve team due to the Players protested for not receiving their dues. On November 16, Soolking feat Rim'K released a song Her name is Lela, some of which were filmed at Omar Hamadi Stadium with the supporters of USM Alger, Soolking is known as a big fan of The Reds and Blacks. On November 28, the medical staff announced the end of the season for Hamza Koudri, after the injury he received against US Biskra with a twisting of the left knee and a rupture of the cruciate ligament. Before the MC Oran match, Ouled EL Bahdja decided to raise a banner in support of Koudri, but the club's management prevented them and according to the group it was Achiou who refused, and after stumbling against them, USM Alger decided to terminate the contract with Denis Lavagne due to poor results. Achiou stated that they will not rush to sign a new coach, who should be worthy of the club's philosophy, Lavagne asked for 198,000 euros after unilateral termination of the contract or to go to FIFA. On December 26, left-back Mehdi Beneddine moved to LB Châteauroux on a six months loan. After winning against Paradou AC, interim coach Azzedine Rahim stated that he does not want to burn the stages and in order to be a head coach you must go through several stages.

On February 6, 2022, the former player in the seventies and eighties Abdelmalek Ali Messaoud died at the age of 66 due to complications from the COVID-19 pandemic in Algeria, and in his career with USM Alger, Ali Messaoud won the Algerian Cup title in 1981 and with the national team two gold medals for the Mediterranean Games in 1975 and the African Games in 1978. After the end of the first stage led by a temporary coach for more than a month, USM Alger contracted with Serbian Zlatko Krmpotić with Moroccan assistant Djamil Ben Ouahi, Krmpotić who has coached several clubs in Africa, will sign a 6-month contract and could be renewed in the event of a place in the league standings at the end of the season. On March 5, in a match against JS Saoura, USM Alger stumbled in a goalless draw and the match witnessed the cancellation of a goal for Al-Ittihad due to the offside situation, and with the replay it was found that the goal was correct, the sports director stated that he will not turn his back on the team and will play for the title, and that there are people within the team as if we were playing for the fall and not in third place, Mustapha Ghorbal who managed a fateful match in Saudi Arabia is not the same as the one who managed our match. After a series of negative results and seven consecutive matches without a win, On April 15, USM Alger decided to terminate the services of sports director Hocine Achiou, Asked on national radio about a possible withdrawal from Groupe SERPORT, Achour Djelloul assured that the public company had no intention of separating from USM Alger. Three days after the defeat against MC Oran, Krmpotić was dismissed from his position and USM Alger decided to rely on his assistant Jamil Benouahi to complete the season.

=== Management Shakeups, Sporting Revival, and Tragic Loss ===
بسم الله الرحمن الرحيم

There was no place for eternity to exist, life begins with a cry and ends with a stroke and the interval between the beginning and the end is a life in which we write what is mentioned about us after death. And you Billel have written with your morals, your humility and your pure spirit what makes your memory immortal in hearts. Every time we want to wake up from the tragedy that befell us, but sadness sends us back to the folds of nostalgia we remember you and our hearts sweeten with what we entrusted about you.
Billel today it is not only Benhammouda family who mourns you and not only USM Alger, but all Algeria will miss you, only in body but you will remain the greatest present in hearts and permanent in minds and you will continue to have an eternal share of prayers. Dear late we do not want the lament to end with a farewell word, we will say to the meeting in the paradise of eternity.

الى الملتقى يا بلال ؛ انا لله وانا اليه راجعون

— Condolence of Secretary General of Union Sportive Médina d'Alger about the death of Billel Benhammouda.

On May 6, Achour Djelloul announced on National Radio that several players would be laid off, and the club would rely more on young talents such as Abderraouf Othmani and Mohamed Ait El Hadj for the upcoming season. He also criticized those advocating for the return of Saïd Allik, claiming they did not want what was best for the club. Additionally, he revealed that the position of sporting director would be abandoned. Djelloul stated that Réda Abdouche would remain with the club next season in an administrative and technical capacity. Furthermore, Djelloul confirmed that USM Alger had officially requested to use the Baraki Stadium, and Groupe SERPORT was ready to complete the remaining work to enable its opening as soon as possible. He emphasized that Omar Hamadi Stadium had become a safety risk for supporters.

However, 25 days later, Djelloul was dismissed from his position following a scandal involving the release of containers of Hyundai vehicles imported by the Tahkout company in 2019. He was temporarily replaced by Abdelkarim Harkati, the former CEO of l’Entreprise Portuaire d’Annaba (EPAN). Following this administrative change, USM Alger recorded their first victory in two months against WA Tlemcen. In the subsequent Algiers Derby, the team secured an important and unexpected win that reignited their hopes for continental qualification. After achieving a fifth consecutive victory, this time against Olympique de Médéa, head coach Jamil Benouahi expressed his desire to remain at the club, saying he had become a fan of the team.

Tragedy struck on June 9, 2022, following the Algeria A' national team’s match against DR Congo A'. Coach Madjid Bougherra had given the players a day off. During this break, USM Alger midfielder Billel Benhammouda was involved in a fatal car accident on the road between Douaouda and Bou Ismaïl, after calling a friend to drive him home. His death was confirmed the following day after DNA tests. Benhammouda was just 24 years old. As the team was preparing to travel to Sétif for their final league match, they returned upon receiving the news of the tragic accident. The Ligue de Football Professionnel (LFP) granted the club’s request to postpone the match to a later date.

== Squad list ==
Players and squad numbers last updated on 17 June 2022.
Note: Flags indicate national team as has been defined under FIFA eligibility rules. Players may hold more than one non-FIFA nationality.

No.	Name	Nat.	Position	Date of birth (age)	Signed in	Contract ends	Signed from	Apps	Goals	Transfer fees
Goalkeepers
1	Lamine Zemmamouche (C.)	(Algeria)	GK	19 March 1985 (aged 36)	2012	2023	(Algeria) MC Alger	404	1	Free transfer
16	Alexis Guendouz	(Algeria)	GK	26 January 1996 (aged 25)	2020	2022	(France) AS Saint-Étienne	24	0	15,000 €
25	Oussama Benbot	(Algeria)	GK	11 October 1994 (aged 27)	2021	2023	(Algeria) JS Kabylie	19	0	Free transfer
Defenders
2	Houari Baouche	(Algeria)	LB	24 December 1994 (aged 27)	2021	2023	(Algeria) USM Bel Abbès	22	0	Free transfer
3	Abderrahim Hamra	(Algeria)	CB	21 July 1997 (aged 24)	2016	2023	(Algeria) Reserve team	80	4	Youth system
4	Zineddine Belaïd	(Algeria)	CB	20 March 1999 (aged 22)	2020	2024	(Algeria) NA Hussein Dey	66	4	20,000,000 DA
5	Mustapha Bouchina	(Algeria)	CB	10 August 1991 (aged 30)	2020	2022	(Algeria) Paradou AC	54	1	11,000,000 DA
12	Haithem Loucif	(Algeria)	RB	8 July 1996 (aged 25)	2021	2023	(Algeria) Paradou AC	29	0	Undisclosed
19	Saâdi Radouani (Note: Radouani played previously for USM Alger from 2015 to 2016.)	(Algeria)	RB	18 March 1995 (aged 26)	2020	2022	(Algeria) ES Sétif	47	1	Free transfer
20	Mehdi Beneddine	(Algeria)	LB	26 February 1996 (aged 25)	2020	2022	(France) Quevilly-Rouen	35	1	Free transfer
21	Adam Alilet	(Algeria)	CB	17 January 1999 (aged 22)	2019	2024	(Algeria) Reserve team	35	2	Youth system
22	Fateh Achour	(Algeria)	RB	15 August 1994 (aged 27)	2020	2022	(Algeria) USM Bel Abbès	28	0	Free transfer
27	Ibrahim Bekakchi	(Algeria)	CB	10 January 1992 (aged 29)	2021	2023	(Algeria) ES Sétif	18	0	Free transfer
Midfielders
6	Oussama Chita	(Algeria)	DM	31 October 1996 (aged 25)	2017	2023	(Algeria) MC Alger	99	2	Free transfer
8	Kamel Belarbi	(Algeria)	DM	11 April 1997 (aged 24)	2018	2022	(Algeria) USM El Harrach	31	0	Free transfer
14	Brahim Benzaza	(Algeria)	DM	8 April 1997 (aged 24)	2021	2023	(Algeria) ASO Chlef	24	1	Free transfer
15	Messala Merbah	(Algeria)	DM	22 July 1994 (aged 27)	2021	2023	(Algeria) ES Sétif	23	1	Free transfer
17	Taher Benkhelifa	(Algeria)	DM	10 June 1994 (aged 27)	2020	2023	(Algeria) Paradou AC	86	3	30,000,000 DA
20	Islam Merili	(Algeria)	AM	27 June 1998 (aged 23)	2022	2024	(Algeria) ASO Chlef	5	0	Free transfer
23	Hamza Koudri (V.C.)	(Algeria)	DM	15 December 1987 (aged 34)	2012	2022	(Algeria) MC Alger	275	15	Free transfer
26	Billel Benhammouda	(Algeria)	AM	28 August 1997 (aged 24)	2016	2023	(Algeria) USMM Hadjout	109	12	Youth system
72	Mohamed Ait El Hadj	(Algeria)	AM	22 March 2002 (aged 19)	2020	2024	(Algeria) Reserve team	12	2	Youth system
Forwards
7	Ismail Belkacemi	(Algeria)	LW	24 June 1993 (aged 28)	2020	2023	(Algeria) CS Constantine	65	25	Free transfer
9	Kwame Opoku	(Ghana)	ST	8 May 1999 (aged 22)	2021	2025	(Ghana) Asante Kotoko	35	6	350,000 €
10	Abderrahmane Meziane	(Algeria)	LW	7 March 1994 (aged 27)	2021	2023	(Tunisia) Espérance de Tunis	131	26	Free transfer
11	Abdelkrim Zouari	(Algeria)	RW	14 July 1989 (aged 32)	2018	2023	(Algeria) USM Bel Abbès	93	20	Free transfer
13	Hamed Belem	(Burkina Faso)	RW	24 September 1999 (aged 22)	2021	2023	(Burkina Faso) Rahimo FC	15	1	75,000 €
18	Aymen Mahious	(Algeria)	ST	15 September 1997 (aged 24)	2018	2023	(Algeria) AS Aïn M'lila	84	26	Loan return
24	Ibrahim Chenihi	(Algeria)	LW / RW	24 January 1990 (aged 31)	2021	2023	Unattached	19	0	Free transfer
71	Abderraouf Othmani	(Algeria)	FW	14 June 2001 (aged 20)	2020	2024	(Algeria) Reserve team	19	5	Youth system

== Transfers ==
=== In ===
==== Summer ====
Date	Pos	Player	From club	Transfer fee	Source
14 August 2021	GK	(Algeria) Oussama Benbot	JS Kabylie	Free transfer	
16 August 2021	DM	(Algeria) Messala Merbah	ES Sétif	Free transfer	
18 August 2021	CB	(Algeria) Ibrahim Bekakchi	ES Sétif	Free transfer	
21 August 2021	LW	(Algeria) Abderrahmane Meziane	(Tunisia) Espérance de Tunis	Free transfer	
12 September 2021	MF	(Algeria) Brahim Benzaza	ASO Chlef	Free transfer	
16 September 2021	RW	(Algeria) Ibrahim Chenihi	Unattached	Free transfer	

==== Winter ====
Date	Pos	Player	From club	Transfer fee	Source
8 February 2022	MF	(Algeria) Islam Merili	ASO Chlef	Free transfer	

=== Out ===
==== Summer ====
Date	Pos	Player	To club	Transfer fee	Source
25 August 2021	ST	(Algeria) Zakaria Naidji	Paradou AC	Loan Return	
18 September 2021	LB	(Algeria) Anis Khemaissia	USM Annaba	Loan for one year	
18 September 2021	FW	(Algeria) Abdelkrim Louanchi	USM El Harrach	Free transfer	
20 September 2021	FW	(Algeria) Zakaria Benchaâ	Unattached (Note: Benchaâ joined Cherno More on 17 February 2022.)	Free transfer	
23 September 2021	GK	(Algeria) Abdelmoumen Sifour	RC Arbaâ	Loan for one year	
24 September 2021	AM	(Algeria) Mohamed Reda Boumechra	JS Kabylie	Free transfer	
15 October 2021	FW	(Algeria) Yacine Aliane	ASO Chlef	Free transfer	
19 October 2021	FW	(Algeria) Mazire Soula	Unattached (Note: Soula joined Cherno More on 13 December 2021.)	Free transfer	

==== Winter ====
Date	Pos	Player	To club	Transfer fee	Source
26 December 2021	LB	(Algeria) Mehdi Beneddine	(France) LB Châteauroux	Loan for six months	
24 February 2022	MF	(Algeria) Kamel Belarbi	NA Hussein Dey	Loan	

=== New contracts ===
No.	Pos	Player	Contract length	Contract end	Date	Source
11	RW	(Algeria) Abdelkrim Zouari	2 years	2023	12 August 2021	
1	GK	(Algeria) Lamine Zemmamouche	2 years	2023	14 September 2021	
71	FW	(Algeria) Abderraouf Othmani	2 years	2024	4 March 2022	
72	FW	(Algeria) Mohamed Ait El Hadj	2 years	2024	4 March 2022	

== Pre-season and friendlies ==
26 September 2021 Friendly	USM Alger	0–0	WA Mostaganem	Mostaganem
16:30
Note: Lineup for USM Alger; First half - Zemmamouche, Radouani, Beneddine, Hamra, Belaïd, Benkhelifa, Koudri, Benhammouda, Belkacemi, Zouari, Othmani. Second half - Benbot, Alilet, Baouche, Bekakchi, Bouchina, Chita, Merbah, Benzaza, Meziane, Chenihi, Ait El Hadj.

29 September 2021 Friendly	ASO Chlef	2–2	USM Alger	Chlef
18:00			Benhammouda 22'; Ait El Hadj 79'	Stadium: Stade Mohamed Boumezrag
Note: Lineup for USM Alger - Zemmamouche (Benbot 49'), Radouani (Alilet 71'), Baouche (Beneddine 49'), Bekakchi (Bouchina 49'), Belaïd (Hamra 49'), Merbah (Chita 71'), Koudri (Benkhelifa 49'), Benhammouda (Benzaza 49'), Zouari (Belkacemi 49'), Meziane (Ait El Hadj 71'), Chenihi (Othmani 49'), (Mahious 71').

4 October 2021 Friendly	USM Alger	0–2	JS Saoura	Bologhine
18:30				Stadium: Omar Hamadi Stadium

10 October 2021 Friendly	USM Alger	1–0	MC Oran	Chlef
16:00	Bekakchi 86'			Stadium: Stade Mohamed Boumezrag
Note: Lineup for USM Alger - Zemmamouche, Bekakchi, Hamra (Beneddine 65'), Radouani, Belaïd, Benkhelifa (Merbah 65'), Koudri (Chita 75'), Benzaza, Meziane, Zouari (Ait El Hadj 65'), Belkacemi.

13 October 2021 Friendly	USM Alger	2–1	Paradou AC	Bologhine
18:00	Benhammouda (penalty missed) 25'; Zouari 81', 87'			Stadium: Omar Hamadi Stadium
Note: Lineup for USM Alger - Benbot, Loucif (Radouani ?'), Beneddine, Alilet, Bekakchi (Belaïd ?'), Hamra (Baouche ?'), Koudri (Benkhelifa ?'), Benzaza (Chita ?'), Benhammouda (Merbah ?'), Othmani (Zouari ?'), Belkacemi (Meziane ?').

15 October 2021 Friendly	USM Alger	1–0	ES Ben Aknoun	Bologhine
18:00	Belkacemi 32'			Stadium: Omar Hamadi Stadium
Note: Lineup for USM Alger - Zemmamouche, Radouani (Alilet 64'), Hamra (Beneddine 64'), Belaïd (Loucif 75'), Bekakchi, Baouche (Benkhelifa 46'), Merbah (Chita 75'), Koudri (Othmani 84'), Zouari (Benhammouda 64'), Meziane (Ait El Hadj 75'), Belkacemi.

13 November 2021 Friendly	USM Alger	2–1	RC Arbaâ	Bologhine
18:00	Belaïd 14'; Zouari 42'			Stadium: Omar Hamadi Stadium
Note: Lineup for USM Alger - Zemmamouche, Belaïd, Bekakchi, Achour, Baouche, Hamra, Chita, Benkhelifa, Zouari, Chenihi, Belkacemi.

20 February 2022 Friendly	USM Alger	3–2	Olympique de Médéa	Bologhine
17:00	Belkacemi (?); Benkhelifa (?); Belaïd (?)		Semahi 11'; Baâli (?)	Stadium: Omar Hamadi Stadium
Note: Lineup for USM Alger; First half - Benbot, Radouani, Hamra, Alilet, Bouchina, Benzaza, Merbah, Meziane, Benhammouda, Belkacemi, Mahious. Second half - Zemmamouche, Loucif, Hamra, Alilet, Bouchina, Benkhelifa, Merili, Zouari, Benhammouda, Belkacemi, Chenihi. Third half - Guendouz, Loucif, Alilet (Belarbi ?'), Achour, Belaïd, Benkhelifa, Chita, Ait El Hadj, Belkacemi (Belem ?'), Chenihi, Othmani.

7 April 2022 Friendly	USM Alger	3–1	NA Hussein Dey	Bologhine
23:00	Meziane 13'; Belem 38'; Mahious 75' (pen.)			Stadium: Omar Hamadi Stadium
Note: Lineup for USM Alger; First half - Guendouz, Baouche, Radouani, Alilet, Bekakchi, Benzaza, Benkhelifa, Ait El Hadj, Meziane, Belem, Opoku. Second half - Guendouz (Boualem 76'), Achour, Ouahab, Bekakchi (Bounacer 60'), Alilet (Merili 60'), Chita, Chenihi, Belkacemi, Zouari, Mahious, Othmani.

== Competitions ==
=== Overview ===
Competition	Record								Started round	Final position / round	First match	Last match
Competition	G	W	D	L	GF	GA	GD	Win %	Started round	Final position / round	First match	Last match
Ligue 1	34	15	12	7	45	22	+23	44.12	—N/a	4th	23 October 2021	17 June 2022
Total	34	15	12	7	45	22	+23	44.12				

Updated to match played 17 June 2022
Source: Competitions

=== Ligue 1 ===
==== League table ====
Pos	Team	Pld	W	D	L	GF	GA	GD	Pts	Qualification or relegation
2	JS Kabylie	34	16	13	5	40	20	+20	61	Qualification for CAF Champions League
3	JS Saoura	34	17	9	8	59	23	+36	60	Qualification for CAF Confederation Cup
4	USM Alger	34	15	12	7	45	22	+23	57	Qualification for CAF Confederation Cup
5	CS Constantine	34	15	10	9	46	29	+17	55	
6	Paradou AC	34	16	6	12	43	36	+7	54 (Note: Paradou AC finished ahead of ES Sétif on head-to-head points: Paradou AC 1–0 ES Sétif, ES Sétif 0–1 Paradou AC.)	

Updated to match(es) played on 17 June 2022. Source: the-sports.org
Rules for classification: 1) points; 2) head-to-head points; 3) head-to-head goal difference; 4) goal difference; 5) total goals; 6) fairplay ranking; 7) playoff.

==== Results summary ====
Overall								Home						Away					
Pld	W	D	L	GF	GA	GD	Pts	W	D	L	GF	GA	GD	W	D	L	GF	GA	GD
34	15	12	7	45	22	+23	57	11	6	0	31	6	+25	4	6	7	14	16	−2

Last updated: 17 June 2022.
Source: Competitive matches

==== Results by round ====
Round	1	2	3	4	5	6	7	8	9	10	11	12	13	14	15	16	17	18	19	20	21	22	23	24	25	26	27	28	29	30	31	32	33	34
Ground	A	H	A	H	H	A	H	A	H	A	H	A	H	A	H	A	H	H	A	H	A	A	H	A	H	A	H	A	H	A	H	A	H	A
Result	D	W	L	W	W	D	D	L	D	L	W	W	D	D	W	W	W	W	L	D	D	D	D	D	D	L	W	L	W	W	W	W	W	L
Position	8	3	8	4	3	4	7	9	9	9	8	7	9	9	9	7	4	3	3	5	6	6	6	7	8	8	7	9	8	7	5	4	4	4

Updated to match(es) played on 17 June 2022. Source: Competitive matches
A = Away; H = Home; W = Win; D = Draw; L = Loss

==== Matches ====
The league fixtures were announced on 7 October 2021.

23 October 2021 Round 1	NA Hussein Dey	1–1	USM Alger	Belouizdad
16:00	Kheiraoui (yellow card) 10'; Boussalem (yellow card) 41'; Banouh 70'; Bayoud (yellow card) 77'; Hamdaoui (yellow card) 90'	LFP report	Belkacemi (penalty missed) 12'; Hamra 42'; Belaïd (yellow card) 75'; Baouche (yellow card) 93'	Stadium: 20 August 1955 Stadium; Attendance: 0 (Note: The match was played behind closed doors due to the COVID-19 pandemic in Algeria.); Referee: Abdelali Ibrir

30 October 2021 Round 2	USM Alger	4–0	RC Arbaâ	Bologhine
15:00	Belkacemi 14'; Mahious 30' (pen.); Zouari 35'; Belaïd 42'	Report	Brahimi (yellow card) 29'; Yacoub (yellow card) 74'	Stadium: Omar Hamadi Stadium; Attendance: 0 Referee: Nadjib Meziani

7 November 2021 Round 3	JS Saoura	1–0	USM Alger	Béchar
17:00	Bouchiba (yellow card) 69'; Amrane (yellow card) 70'; Bellatreche 88' (yellow card) 88'; Saidi (yellow card) 90'	Report	Hamra (yellow card) 33'	Stadium: 20 August 1955 Stadium; Referee: Said Aouina

20 November 2021 Round 4	USM Alger	3–0	US Biskra	Bologhine
18:00	Benhammouda 15', 21'; Radouani (yellow card) 76'; Belkacemi 82' (pen.)	Report	Zobir (yellow card) 7'; Rais (yellow card) 73'; Boulanouar (yellow card) 76'	Stadium: Omar Hamadi Stadium; Attendance: 0 (close doors); Referee: Mehdi Abid Charef

25 November 2021 Round 5	USM Alger	3–1	RC Relizane	Bologhine
18:00	Belkacemi 22'; Benhammouda 37', 58'	Report	Balegh 83'	Stadium: Omar Hamadi Stadium; Attendance: 0 (close doors); Referee: Abderrezzak Arab

4 December 2021 Round 6	HB Chelghoum Laïd	0–0	USM Alger	Chelghoum Laïd
14:30	Benchoucha (yellow card) 33'; Haddad (yellow card) 70'; Elmenaouer (yellow card) 75'	Report	Bouchina (yellow card) 85'; Belaïd (yellow card) 90'	Stadium: 11 December 1961 Stadium; Referee: Mustapha Ghorbal

17 December 2021 Round 8	ASO Chlef	2–1	USM Alger	Chlef
15:00	Aguieb 5'; Alili 18'; Merili (yellow card) 28'; Abada (yellow card) 41'	Report	Mahious 88' (pen.); Baouche (yellow card) 90+4'	Stadium: Mohamed Boumezrag Stadium; Referee: Abdelali Ibrir

24 December 2021 Round 9	USM Alger	0–0	MC Oran	Bologhine
18:00	Baouche (yellow card) 21'; Belaïd (yellow card) 42'; Bouchina (red card) 45+1'	Report	Belmokhtar (yellow card) 55'; Khettab (red card) 64'; Khadir (yellow card) 90+2'	Stadium: Omar Hamadi Stadium; Attendance: 0 (close doors); Referee: Mehdi Abid Charef

28 December 2021 Round 10	CR Belouizdad	1–0	USM Alger	Belouizdad
14:30	Bouchar (yellow card) 49'; Bourdim 80'	Report	Benkhelifa (yellow card) 15'; Zouari (penalty missed) 48'	Stadium: 20 August 1955 Stadium; Attendance: 0 (close doors); Referee: Youcef Gamouh

3 January 2022 Round 11	USM Alger	4–1	NC Magra	Bologhine
18:00	Belaïd 19'; Benzaza 39'; Benkhelifa 54'; Belkacemi 75' (pen.)	Report	Bouchouareb 24'; Meghazi (yellow card) 25'; Bouguèche (yellow card) 49'; Benkouider (yellow card) 65'	Stadium: Omar Hamadi Stadium; Attendance: 0 (close doors); Referee: Houssam Benyahia

8 January 2022 Round 12	WA Tlemcen	0–3	USM Alger	Tlemcen
14:30	Mebarki (yellow card) 36'	Report	Mahious 38'; Meziane 42', 57'	Stadium: Colonel Lotfi Stadium; Referee: Mohamed Tahar Milia

16 January 2022 Round 13	USM Alger	1–1	MC Alger	Bologhine
16:00	Merbah (yellow card) 31'; Meziane 52'	Report	Touki (yellow card) 38'; Zaidi 65'	Stadium: Omar Hamadi Stadium; Attendance: 0 (close doors); Referee: Abdelali Ibrir

21 January 2022 Round 14	CS Constantine	1–1	USM Alger	Constantine
14:30	Belahouel (penalty missed) 16'; Mebarakou (yellow card) 26' (yellow-red card) 46'; Koukpo 90+4'	Report	Zouari 27' (yellow card) 76'; Bouchina (yellow card) 56'; Benhammouda (yellow card) 69'; Merbah (yellow card) 78'; Benbot (yellow card) 90+2'	Stadium: Ramadane Ben Abdelmalek Stadium; Referee: Mohamed Saidi

25 January 2022 Round 15	USM Alger	2–1	Paradou AC	Bologhine
14:30	Belkacemi 24', 33'; Merbah (yellow card) 39' (yellow-red card) 74'	Report	Bouzok 45+1'; Kaassis (yellow card) 78'	Stadium: Omar Hamadi Stadium; Attendance: 0 (close doors); Referee: Mohamed Bouteraa

29 January 2022 Round 16	Olympique de Médéa	1–3	USM Alger	Médéa
14:30	Nehari 12' (yellow card) 62'	Report	Mahious 10', 63'; Benhammouda 82'	Stadium: Imam Lyes Stadium; Referee: Nabil Boukhalfa

3 February 2022 Round 7	USM Alger	0–0	JS Kabylie	Bologhine
18:00	Benhammouda (yellow card) 33'; Zouari (yellow card) 45+1'; Bouchina (yellow card) 64'; Belaïd (red card) 90+2'	Report	Talah (yellow card) 38'; Ghanem (yellow card) 82'; Harrag (yellow card) 90'	Stadium: Omar Hamadi Stadium; Attendance: 0 (close doors); Referee: Lotfi Bekouassa

7 February 2022 Round 17	USM Alger	1–0	ES Sétif	Bologhine
18:00	Mahious 16' (pen.); Merbah (yellow card) 18'	Report	Karaoui (yellow card) 27'	Stadium: Omar Hamadi Stadium; Attendance: 0 (close doors); Referee: Youcef Gamouh

25 February 2022 Round 18	USM Alger	1–0	NA Hussein Dey	Bologhine
18:00	Mahious 25' (pen.); Meziane (yellow card) 33'; Benzaza (yellow card) 69'; Chenihi (yellow card) 89'; Belkacemi (yellow card) 90+1'	Report	Bouloudène (yellow card) 39'; Benayad (yellow card) 76'; Aggoun (yellow card) 90+3'	Stadium: Omar Hamadi Stadium; Attendance: 0 (close doors); Referee: Hamza Bouslimani

1 March 2022 Round 19	RC Arbaâ	2–0	USM Alger	Larbaâ
15:00	Oukil 42'; Benlaribi 50'	Report		Stadium: Ismaïl Makhlouf Stadium; Attendance: 0 (close doors); Referee: Houssam Benyahia

5 March 2022 Round 20	USM Alger	0–0	JS Saoura	Bologhine
18:00	Benzaza (yellow card) 33'; Zemmamouche (yellow card) 64'; Belaïd (yellow card) 64'; Merbah (yellow card) 74'	Report	Mellal (yellow card) 36'; Ouis (yellow card) 42'; Khelif (yellow card) 65'; Saidi (yellow card) 90+5'	Stadium: Omar Hamadi Stadium; Attendance: 0 (close doors); Referee: Mustapha Ghorbal

11 March 2022 Round 21	US Biskra	0–0	USM Alger	Biskra
14:30	Djahnit (yellow card) 45+5'; Boufligha (yellow card) 54'	Report	Merbah (red card) 22'	Stadium: 18 February Stadium; Referee: Mohamed Ali Nader

18 March 2022 Round 22	RC Relizane	0–0	USM Alger	Relizane
15:00	Mazari (yellow card) 50'	Report	Benzaza (yellow card) 21' (yellow-red card) 69'	Stadium: Tahar Zoughari Stadium; Referee: Abdelmoumen Touabti

26 March 2022 Round 23	USM Alger	1–1	HB Chelghoum Laïd	Bologhine
18:00	Opoku 27'; Benhammouda (yellow card) 40'	Report	Khaldi 25'; Aïb (yellow card) 29'; Zaitri (yellow card) 67'; Alaoui (yellow card) 71'	Stadium: Omar Hamadi Stadium; Attendance: 0 (close doors); Referee: Zakaria Antar

1 April 2022 Round 24	JS Kabylie	1–1	USM Alger	Tizi Ouzou
18:00	El Orfi 66'; Oukaci (yellow card) 89'	Report	Opoku (yellow card) 6'; Benkhelifa (yellow card) 40'; Ait El Hadj 45'; Benzaza (yellow card) 61'; Benhammouda (yellow card) 90+3'	Stadium: 1 November 1954 Stadium; Referee: Mehdi Abid Charef

13 April 2022 Round 25	USM Alger	1–1	ASO Chlef	Bologhine
22:00	Benkhelifa (yellow card) 13'; Meziane 52'; Ait El Hadj (yellow card) 70'; Belkacemi (penalty missed) 90+2'	Report	Baaziz (yellow card) 6'; Zahzouh (yellow card) 20'; Souibaâh 81'	Stadium: Omar Hamadi Stadium; Attendance: 0 (close doors); Referee: Mohamed Amine Sakhraoui

17 April 2022 Round 26	MC Oran	2–1	USM Alger	Oran
22:30	Djabout 20'; Chadli 77' (yellow card) 77'; Soufi (yellow card) 90+3'	Report	Othmani 49' (yellow card) 49'	Stadium: Ahmed Zabana Stadium; Referee: Abdelali Ibrir

29 April 2022 Round 28	NC Magra	1–0	USM Alger	Magra
15:45	Demane (yellow card) 38'; Ziouache (yellow card) 54'; Bouchouareb 73'; Benkouider (yellow card) 85'; Chellali (yellow card) 90+2'	Report	Belaïd (yellow card) 84'	Stadium: Boucheligue Brothers Stadium; Referee: Abderrezak Arab

6 May 2022 Round 29	USM Alger	2–0	WA Tlemcen	Bologhine
18:00	Othmani 44'; Ait El Hadj 79'	Report		Stadium: Omar Hamadi Stadium; Attendance: 0 (close doors); Referee: Rafik Aouina

15 May 2022 Round 30	MC Alger	0–1	USM Alger	Algiers
19:00		Report	Benhammouda 56'; Loucif (yellow card) 74'	Stadium: Stade du 5 Juillet; Referee: Abdelmoumen Touabti

20 May 2022 Round 31	USM Alger	2–0	CS Constantine	Bologhine
18:00	Alilet (yellow card) 47'; Benhammouda 53'; Meziane 67'; Benkhelifa (yellow card) 87'	Report	Lakdja (yellow card) 47'	Stadium: Omar Hamadi Stadium; Attendance: 0 (close doors); Referee: Nabil Boukhalfa

27 May 2022 Round 32	Paradou AC	0–1	USM Alger	Dar El Beïda
16:45	Zerrouki (yellow card) 90+1'; Aoued (yellow card) 90+3'	Report	Belaïd 51' (yellow card) 90+1'; Meziane (yellow card) 62'; Guendouz (yellow card) 90+3'	Stadium: Omar Benrabah Stadium; Attendance: 0 (close doors); Referee: Youcef Gamouh

3 June 2022 Round 33	USM Alger	4–0	Olympique de Médéa	Bologhine
16:45	Belkacemi 21'; Chita (yellow card) 37'; Othmani 45'; Merbah 55'; Alilet 73'; Bouchina (yellow card) 77'	Report	Bellaouel (yellow card) 38'; Gharrich (yellow card) 39'	Stadium: Omar Hamadi Stadium; Attendance: 0 (close doors); Referee: Lamia Athmane

8 June 2022 Round 27	USM Alger	2–0	CR Belouizdad	Bologhine
18:45	Ait El Hadj (yellow card) 51'; Merbah (yellow card) 64'; Belkacemi 78'; Mahious (yellow card) 89' (goal) 90+2'	Report	Bousseliou (yellow card) 28'; Djerrar (yellow card) 44'; Bourdim (yellow card) 62'	Stadium: Omar Hamadi Stadium; Attendance: 0 (close doors); Referee: Lotfi Bekouassa

17 June 2022 Round 34	ES Sétif	3–1	USM Alger	Sétif
18:00	Riad Benayad 4', 66'; Bakrar 44' (pen.); Benabed (yellow card) 62'	Report	Belharrane 27'; Azri (yellow card) 43'	Stadium: 8 May 1945 Stadium; Referee: Mohamed Saïdi

== Squad information ==
=== Appearances and goals ===
No.	Pos	Player	Nat	Ligue 1			Total		
No.	Pos	Player	Nat	App	St	G	App	St	G
Goalkeepers
1	GK	Mohamed Lamine Zemmamouche	(Algeria)	4	4	0	4	4	0
16	GK	Alexis Guendouz	(Algeria)	10	10	0	10	10	0
25	GK	Oussama Benbot	(Algeria)	19	19	0	19	19	0
Defenders
2	LB	Houari Baouche	(Algeria)	18	16	0	18	16	0
3	CB	Abderrahim Hamra	(Algeria)	13	10	1	13	10	1
4	CB	Zineddine Belaïd	(Algeria)	30	30	3	30	30	3
5	CB	Mustapha Bouchina	(Algeria)	19	14	0	19	14	0
12	RB	Haithem Loucif	(Algeria)	23	15	0	23	15	0
19	RB	Saâdi Radouani	(Algeria)	25	19	0	25	19	0
21	CB	Adam Alilet	(Algeria)	12	9	1	12	9	1
22	RB	Fateh Achour	(Algeria)	12	8	0	12	8	0
27	CB	Ibrahim Bekakchi	(Algeria)	18	18	0	18	18	0
Midfielders
6	DM	Oussama Chita	(Algeria)	14	5	0	14	5	0
14	DM	Brahim Benzaza	(Algeria)	24	17	1	24	17	1
15	DM	Messala Merbah	(Algeria)	23	18	1	23	18	1
17	DM	Taher Benkhelifa	(Algeria)	23	18	1	23	18	1
20	AM	Islam Merili	(Algeria)	5	2	0	5	2	0
23	DM	Hamza Koudri	(Algeria)	4	4	0	4	4	0
26	AM	Billel Benhammouda	(Algeria)	30	24	7	30	24	7
Forwards
7	LW	Ismail Belkacemi	(Algeria)	24	19	8	24	19	8
9	ST	Kwame Opoku	(Ghana)	18	7	1	18	7	1
10	LW	Abderrahmane Meziane	(Algeria)	21	18	5	21	18	5
11	RW	Abdelkrim Zouari	(Algeria)	21	18	2	21	18	2
13	RW	Hamed Belem	(Burkina Faso)	7	1	1	7	1	1
18	ST	Aymen Mahious	(Algeria)	24	15	8	24	15	8
24	LW / RW	Ibrahim Chenihi	(Algeria)	20	0	0	20	0	0
71	FW	Abderraouf Othmani	(Algeria)	14	6	3	14	6	3
72	FW	Mohamed Ait El Hadj	(Algeria)	12	10	2	12	10	2
Reserves
		Mohamed Djenidi	(Algeria)	1	1	0	1	1	0
	DF	Abdelkader Belharrane	(Algeria)	1	1	1	1	1	1
		Abdelkrim Namani	(Algeria)	1	1	0	1	1	0
	GK	Abdellah Azri	(Algeria)	1	1	0	1	1	0
		Amine Hadjam	(Algeria)	1	1	0	1	1	0
		Aymen Kennan	(Algeria)	1	1	0	1	1	0
		Houssam Zouraghi	(Algeria)	1	1	0	1	1	0
		Samy Bouali	(Algeria)	1	1	0	1	1	0
		Djelloul Bouteldji	(Algeria)	1	1	0	1	1	0
		Mostafa Bekane	(Algeria)	1	1	0	1	1	0
		Yasser Abdelkader Bourahli	(Algeria)	1	1	0	1	1	0
		Younes Douiri	(Algeria)	1	0	0	1	0	0
Players transferred out during the season
~~20~~	LB	Mehdi Beneddine	(Algeria)	1	1	0	1	1	0
~~8~~	DM	Kamel Belarbi	(Algeria)	1	1	0	1	1	0
Total				34		45	34		45

Last updated: 17 June 2022
Source: soccerway.com

=== Disciplinary record ===
No.	Pos.	Player	Ligue 1			Total		
No.	Pos.	Player	Yellow card	(yellow card) (yellow-red card)	Red card	Yellow card	(yellow card) (yellow-red card)	Red card
1	GK	(Algeria) Mohamed Lamine Zemmamouche	1	0	0	1	0	0
16	GK	(Algeria) Alexis Guendouz	1	0	0	1	0	0
25	GK	(Algeria) Oussama Benbot	1	0	0	1	0	0
	GK	(Algeria) Abdellah Azri	1	0	0	1	0	0
2	DF	(Algeria) Houari Baouche	3	0	0	3	0	0
3	DF	(Algeria) Abderrahim Hamra	2	0	0	2	0	0
4	DF	(Algeria) Zineddine Belaïd	6	0	1	6	0	1
5	DF	(Algeria) Mustapha Bouchina	4	0	1	4	0	1
12	DF	(Algeria) Haithem Loucif	1	0	0	1	0	0
19	DF	(Algeria) Saâdi Radouani	1	0	0	1	0	0
21	DF	(Algeria) Adam Alilet	1	0	0	1	0	0
6	MF	(Algeria) Oussama Chita	2	0	0	2	0	0
14	MF	(Algeria) Brahim Benzaza	2	1	0	2	1	0
15	MF	(Algeria) Messala Merbah	7	1	1	7	1	1
17	MF	(Algeria) Taher Benkhelifa	4	0	0	4	0	0
26	MF	(Algeria) Billel Benhammouda	4	0	0	4	0	0
7	FW	(Algeria) Ismail Belkacemi	1	0	0	1	0	0
9	FW	(Ghana) Kwame Opoku	1	0	0	1	0	0
10	FW	(Algeria) Abderrahmane Meziane	2	0	0	2	0	0
11	FW	(Algeria) Abdelkrim Zouari	2	0	0	2	0	0
24	FW	(Algeria) Ibrahim Chenihi	1	0	0	1	0	0
71	FW	(Algeria) Abderraouf Othmani	1	0	0	1	0	0
72	FW	(Algeria) Mohamed Ait El Hadj	1	0	0	1	0	0
Total			50	2	3	50	2	3

=== Goalscorers ===
Includes all competitive matches. The list is sorted alphabetically by surname when total goals are equal.

No.	Nat.	Player	Pos.	L 1	TOTAL
18	(Algeria)	Aymen Mahious	FW	8	8
7	(Algeria)	Ismail Belkacemi	FW	8	8
26	(Algeria)	Billel Benhammouda	MF	7	7
10	(Algeria)	Abderrahmane Meziane	FW	5	5
71	(Algeria)	Abderraouf Othmani	FW	3	3
4	(Algeria)	Zineddine Belaïd	CB	3	3
72	(Algeria)	Mohamed Ait El Hadj	FW	2	2
11	(Algeria)	Abdelkrim Zouari	FW	2	2
3	(Algeria)	Abderrahim Hamra	CB	1	1
14	(Algeria)	Brahim Benzaza	MF	1	1
17	(Algeria)	Taher Benkhelifa	MF	1	1
9	(Ghana)	Kwame Opoku	FW	1	1
14	(Algeria)	Messala Merbah	MF	1	1
21	(Algeria)	Adam Alilet	CB	1	1
48	(Algeria)	Abdelkader Belharrane	RB	1	1
Own Goals				0	0
Totals				45	45

=== Penalties ===
Date	Nation	Name	Opponent	Scored?
23 October 2021	(Algeria)	Ismail Belkacemi	NA Hussein Dey	Penalty missed
30 October 2021	(Algeria)	Aymen Mahious	RC Arbaâ	✓
20 November 2021	(Algeria)	Ismail Belkacemi	US Biskra	✓
17 December 2021	(Algeria)	Aymen Mahious	ASO Chlef	✓
28 December 2021	(Algeria)	Abdelkrim Zouari	CR Belouizdad	Penalty missed
3 January 2022	(Algeria)	Ismail Belkacemi	NC Magra	✓
7 February 2022	(Algeria)	Aymen Mahious	ES Sétif	✓
25 February 2022	(Algeria)	Aymen Mahious	NA Hussein Dey	✓
13 April 2022	(Algeria)	Ismail Belkacemi	ASO Chlef	Penalty missed

=== Clean sheets ===
Includes all competitive matches.

No.	Nat	Name	L 1	Total
1	(Algeria)	Mohamed Lamine Zemmamouche	2	2
16	(Algeria)	Alexis Guendouz	7	7
25	(Algeria)	Oussama Benbot	8	8
		TOTALS	17	17
