= Algiers Derby =

Algerian football club rivalry name

Derby algérois
- Other names: Derby algérois ديربي الجزائر
- Location: Algiers, Algeria, Africa
- Teams: MC Alger; USM Alger
- First meeting: MC Alger 4–1 USM Alger; Forconi Cup (14 November 1940)
- Latest meeting: MC Alger 1–0 USM Alger; Ligue 1 (1 April 2026)
- Broadcasters: EPTV Terrestre
- Stadiums: Stade du 5 Juillet

Statistics
- Total meetings: 121 (93 league)
- Most wins: MC Alger (47)
- Most player appearances: Mohamed Lamine Zemmamouche (33)
- Top scorer: Abdeslam Bousri (10)
- All-time series: MC Alger: 48; Drawn: 41; USM Alger: 32
- Largest victory: MC Alger 5–1 USM Alger; Forconi Cup (Round of 16: 4 December 1949)
- Longest win streak: 4 games (MC Alger)

The Algiers Derby is the name given to matches between MC Alger and USM Alger, both football clubs from Algiers, Algeria. It is the oldest club football derby in Algeria, with the first match being contested in 1940. MC Alger play at the Stade 5 Juillet 1962 and USM Alger at Stade Omar Hammadi. The two clubs have met in every domestic competition, including those held before independence.

== History ==
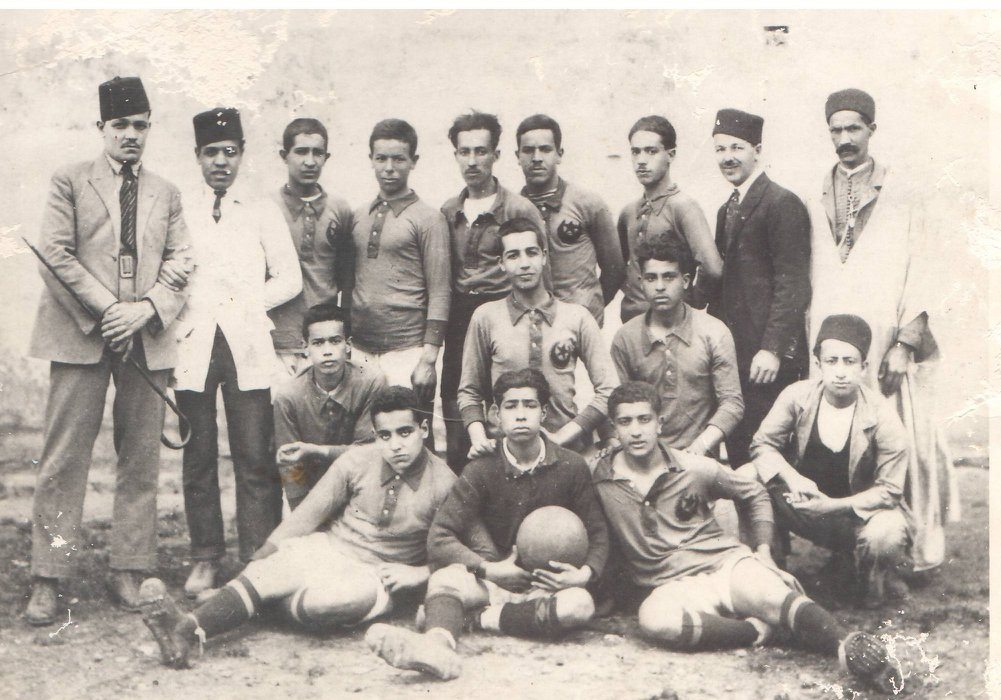
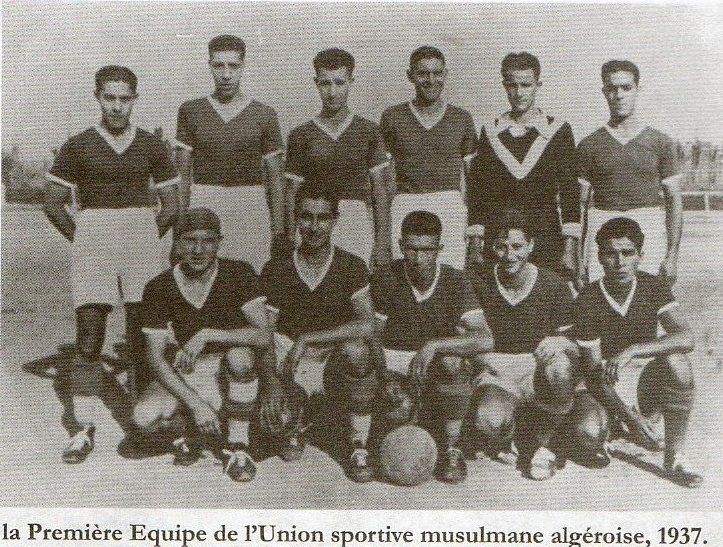
First team of MC Alger and USM Alger.

=== Early years ===
The Algiers Derby between USM Alger and MC Alger is the biggest derby in Algeria. The first meeting between the two teams in 1940 ended in victory for MC Alger. In the Final of the 1962–63 Algerian Championnat National, USMA won 3-0 against MC Alger, becoming the first champion following the independence of Algeria.

In 1971, MC Alger secured the Cup Final with a 2-0 win over USMA, and went on to repeat the same feat two years later in a 4-2 victory after extra time. In 1982, USM Alger dispatched MC Alger in the quarterfinals on the way to winning their first Cup Final.

In 1977 a sports reform was carried out as intended by the Ministry of Youth and Sports, in order to give the elite clubs a good financial base allowing them to structure themselves professionally (in ASP Which means Association Sportive de Performances). The aim was therefore that they should have full management autonomy with the creation of their own training center. MC Alger sponsored by the national hydrocarbon company Sonatrach which induces the change of its name which becomes Mouloudia Pétroliers d'Alger (MPA). as for USM Alger sponsors the club and change the name to Union sportive kahraba d'Alger (USK Alger), (Arabic: كهرباء, kahraba) meaning electricity who had inherited the Société nationale de l'électricité et du gaz company (Sonelgaz).

Apart from that victory, USM Alger struggled during the 1980's and early 90's, playing only five seasons in the top flight, thus limiting the number of meaningful derbies.

=== Promoted of USM Alger and the derby return again ===
In 1995, the USM Alger returned to the top flight for the first time in five seasons, On 8 February 1996, the Algiers Derby at Omar Hamadi Stadium in Bologhine was abandoned following a serious crowd-related incident. The match had been played in front of a packed stadium during the month of Ramadan, and USM Alger took the lead in the 13th minute through Nacer Zekri. Shortly after the goal, a flare thrown from the stands struck assistant referee Benhamouda on the head, causing an injury and bleeding. Given the severity of the incident and the tense atmosphere inside the stadium, referee Belbordj decided to stop the match, which was subsequently abandoned. The episode remains one of the most notable incidents in the history of the Algiers Derby. and in the same season the USMA won the league title after thirty-three years for first title.

in the 1998–99 Algerian Cup Semi-finals there was a great controversy over the way the game was played, where it was supposed to play from two games, but the Ministry of Youth and Sports decided to play the two games in Stade du 5 Juillet, Saïd Allik President of USMA, refused this insisting that each team plays in his stadium and Stade du 5 Juillet, he was the official stadium of MC Alger, after which the Minister of Youth and Sports Mohamed Aziz Derouaz rejected this request and insisted that he play on Stade du 5 Juillet for security reasons. On the day of the match, USM Alger went to Omar Hamadi Stadium and MC Alger and the referees to Stade du 5 Juillet. Minister of the Interior and Local Authorities at that time Abdelmalek Sellal called Allik to find a solution to this problem, His response was that there were two solutions the first is that each team plays in its stadium Or hold one game in a neutral stadium, and Allik proposes Stade du 19 Mai 1956 in Annaba, but because of the black decade and since both of them are from the capital, it was decided to hold it in Stade du 5 Juillet.

In 2004 Stade 5 Juillet 1962 in a Ramadan evening in a meeting months is the presence of more than 100,000 spectators, it won the USMA lead to 1-2 and scored the winning goal player Hocine Achiou a goal from a heel like « Madjer », in the return leg MCA won by the score 1-2 goals scored Noureddine Daham, the first win in six years Then the two teams met in the final of the cup twice in 2006 and 2007 a row ended with the victory of MCA and simplifies the control of the MCA in the cup in the fourth final between the two teams, In the 2005-2006 season, he met with the two teams in the league in the first leg at Stade 5 Juillet 1962 MC Alger take the lead, by centre-back Ismaël Bouzid in 18 minutes, where he remained advanced the lead, and after that the supporters of USMA looked to leave and celebrate the supporters of MCA winning Nigerian striker Michael Eneramo arises in the final seconds to restore order. Moulay Haddou recovers a touchdown Boudiaf and on a long center will find Eneramo, strangely alone who, with a stitched head, releases his own and will make cry for goalkeeper Merouane Abdouni who certainly did not accept to cash a goal of the kind against his former team in one of the most exciting matches between the two clubs.

=== Second professional era (since 2010) ===
It was decided by the Ligue de Football Professionnel and the Algerian Football Federation to professionalize the Algerian football championship, starting from the 2010–11 season Thus all the Algerian football clubs which until then enjoyed the status of semi-professional club, will acquire the professional appointment this season. the president of the Algerian Football Federation, Mohamed Raouraoua, has been speaking since his inauguration as the federation's president in Professionalism, USM Alger become the first professional club in Algeria businessman Ali Haddad became the majority share owner after investing 700 million Algeria dinars to buy an 83% ownership in the club. On 27 October 2010, Haddad replaced Saïd Allik as president of the club. Allik had been the club's president for the past 18 years. As for MC Alger a protocol of agreement was signed between Sonatrach and SSPA MCA to purchase 100 percent of the capital of the sports company with shares of MC Alger, The President and General Manager of the Petroleum Company as well as the Executive Financial Director of the company Omar Beja, attended on the Mouloudia side, Chairman of the Board of Directors Abdelkader Bouhraoua who signed the protocol. Regarding the debts recorded in the proceeds, the shareholders of the sports institution with shares pledged to MCA to give up their shares in favor of Sonatrach at the nominal value of the latter.

In the 2013 Algerian Cup Final for the fifth time in history. USM Alger defeated of them with a goal scored by Mokhtar Benmoussa. USMA won its eighth title. Also this was the first time that Al Ittihad won against Mouloudia in the final after four defeats before. After the end of the match and while heading to get the medals, MC Alger refused to go up in protest against the performance of referee Djamel Haimoudi, and then has to punish the club president Omar Gharib lifelong player Faouzi Chaouchi and Réda Babouche two years and coach Djamel Menad one year. In 2014, the two teams met in the final of the Super Cup, for the first time, and the game ended with MC Alger victory by a goal scored Sid Ahmed Aouedj. Moreover, a scandal then mars this competition. Algerian international assistant referee, Amine Bitam, together with the game officer, told the local press that a senior Algerian official ordered for MCA players to deliberately injure their opponents during the match. A worthwhile goal for USM Alger was denied under the pretext of offside. The case is currently in court. the two clubs met again for the Super cup in first of November 2016, the game was played at the Mustapha Tchaker Stadium and USMA were crowned winners after the game ended with 2 goals scored Farouk Chafaï and Mohamed Rabie Meftah by a penalty.

On 2 June 2019, it is official, the Haddad family is selling its 92% shareholding in SSPA USMA. It was the club's communication officer, Amine Tirmane, who announced it on the Echourouk TV. the reasons that made them make this decision is the imprisonment of club owner Ali Haddad and also freeze all financial accounts of the club. After it was expected that the USM Alger general assembly of shareholders will be on 12 March 2020, it was submitted to 2 March, especially after the imprisonment of the former club president, Rabouh Haddad. The meeting witnessed the attendance of ETRHB Haddad representative and the absence of the amateur club president Saïd Allik, and after two and a half hours, it was announced that Groupe SERPORT had bought the shares of ETRHB Haddad which amounted to 94.34%. On 8 August 2021 the President of the Republic Abdelmadjid Tebboune has announced that the management of the new stadium of Douera will be for MC Alger. As he recalled the founding of the Club on 7 August 1921 by the late Abderrahmane Aouf, and returned to the team's obstacle course and its stoppage before and during the Algerian war. The rate of progress of the stadium's work has reached around 55%, according to the 2020 activity report presented last February by the Ministry of Youth and Sports. For several years, several Algerian clubs including USM Alger, CR Belouizdad and MC Alger have been asking that one of the two new football stadiums under construction in Baraki and Douera be awarded to them.

On 3 June 2023, USMA became the first Algerian winners of the CAF Confederation Cup and the first international title in its history, after its victory against Young Africans. In the second leg of the final, Groupe UNITED 1937 attended to set up the largest tifo in Algeria that includes the entire stadium, but it was canceled after a group of MC Alger supporters came and spoiled it, so a battle broke out in the stands with them where the Police rescued them. Three months later, USMA won its second continental title by winning the CAF Super Cup against Al Ahly. In the 2023–24 season, MC Alger made major signings that contributed to winning the first Ligue 1 title in 14 years and secured the title after winning against USM Alger.

== Supporters ==
=== Ouled EL Bahdja ===
is the football club with the biggest fanbase in Algeria. The club was founded in the nineties and was the only one in that period; they were often recorded with a sporty character song, as they always took great pictures with their fans. Their colors reminded football fans of Milan (red and black). Ouled EL Bahdja made a name for themselves both at home, and in international matches, receiving tifo in the Ligue Professionnelle 1 or in continental competitions such as for Music of Ouled EL Bahdja.

The Algerian fans resonated with the club’s change of name because of its fame that went beyond the border in Tunisia and Morocco. On 14 December 2022, Ouled EL Bahdja announced that the club would end its activity after 15 years. Its members said that after deep thinking, they are retiring, and secondly, they are no longer able to serve USM Alger as they did before, and also the problems and harassment that befell them. He was taken to court, and the statement was concluded with the slogan: “USMA will remain, EL Bahdja will remain, and history will remain”.^{[1]}

=== Verde Leone ===
Among the club's supporters groups, the Ultras Verde Leone (UVL07), a group of young supporters created on 10 October 2007 and dissolved in 2018. This group made its first appearance during an Algerian league match on 21 October 2007 against JS Kabylie, It is the first group of Ultras in Algeria. The other groups are the ultras the twelfth player (UTTP), the ultras green corsairs (UGC), vert et rouge (GVR) which retired in 2019 as well as the ultras amore e mentalità (UAM) and the ultras Squalo verde (USV) who joined the ultra movement in 2019.

=== Derby accident 2013 ===
On 21 September 2013 Died, two supporters of USM Alger attended the events of the match against MC Alger, after the collapse of part of the "Stade 5 Juillet 1962", The incident and the death of supporters Azeeb Sufyan and Saif al-Din Darhoum, and injuring several hundred others in Algiers spoiled the joy of winning the Darby supporters of the USM Alger, The drama occurred ten minutes after the end of the match. Part of the 13th of the Stade 5 Juillet 1962 collapsed. After this incident there was a plan to destroy the whole stadium, but they retreated and decided to remove only the upper terraces and renovate them completely, the local authorities decided to close the stadium, where an investigation was opened into the incident he was also sacked director of the compound Youcef Kara after that, the funeral was attended by officials of the USM Alger led by Rabouh Haddad, who conveyed condolences to the family of the deceased and their condolences.

== All-time head-to-head results ==
As of 1 April 2026

Tournament	GP	UV	D	MV	GoalU	GoalM
Ligue Professionnelle 1	93	26	38	29	97	92
Ligue Professionnelle 2	8	2	1	5	9	18
Algerian Cup	12	2	2	8	11	21
League Cup	2	1	0	1	2	1
Super Cup	3	1	0	2	2	2
Forconi Cup	3	0	0	3	2	11
TOTAL	121	32	41	48	123	145

GP: Games Played
UV: USM Alger Victory
D: Draw
MV: MC Alger Victory
GoalU: USM Alger Goals
GoalM: MC Alger Goals

== All-Time Top Scorers ==
Player	Club	Ligue 1	Algerian Cup	Super Cup	League Cup	Total
(Algeria) Abdeslam Bousri	MC Alger	6	4	—	—	10
(Algeria) Omar Betrouni	MC Alger	6	2	—	—	8
(Algeria) Hassen Tahir	MC Alger	5	—	—	—	5
(Algeria) Noureddine Daham	MC Alger	3	2	—	—	5
(Algeria) Kamel Tchalabi	USM Alger	4	—	—	—	4
(Algeria) Nacer Guedioura	USM Alger	3	1	—	—	4
(Algeria) Aziz Oucif	MC Alger	4	—	—	—	4
(Algeria) Abdelwahab Zenir	MC Alger	4	—	—	—	4
(Algeria) Zoubir Bachi	MC Alger	2	2	—	—	4
(Algeria) Mounir Dob	MC Alger	3	—	—	1	4
(Algeria) Hocine Rabet	USM Alger	4	—	—	—	4

== All-Time Top appearances ==
Bold Still playing competitive football in Algeria
Statistics correct as of game on 1 April 2026

Player	Club	Ligue 1	Algerian Cup	Super Cup	League Cup	Total
(Algeria) Lamine Zemmamouche	USM Alger, MC Alger	26	4	2	1	33
(Algeria) Hamza Koudri	MC Alger, USM Alger	26	2	2	—	30
(Algeria) Karim Ghazi	USM Alger, MC Alger	25	3	—	—	28
(Algeria) Mohamed Hamdoud	USM Alger	21	3	—	—	24
(Algeria) Omar Betrouni	MC Alger, USM Alger	19	5	—	—	24
(Algeria) Billel Dziri	USM Alger	19	3	—	—	22
(Algeria) Abderahmane Hachoud	MC Alger	18	—	2	1	21
(Algeria) Bouzid Mahyouz	MC Alger	16	4	—	—	20
(Algeria) Abdeslam Bousri	MC Alger	14	6	—	—	20
(Algeria) Nacereddine Khoualed	USM Alger	16	2	2	—	20

== Consecutive goalscoring ==
Player	Club	Consecutive matches	Total goals in the run	Start	End
(Algeria) Hassen Tahir	MC Alger	3	4	1968–69 Nationale II (6th round)	1969–70 Nationale I (6th round)
(Algeria) Abdeslam Bousri	MC Alger	2	3	1982–83 Division 1 (17th round)	1985–86 Division 2 (8th round)
(Algeria) Noureddine Daham	MC Alger	2	3	2004–05 Division 1 (8th round)	2004–05 Division 1 (23rd round)

== Honours ==
MC Alger won their first honour in 1948 with victory in the départementale Cup and USM Alger in 1963 with the national championship title. There have been once occasions where MC Alger and USM Alger, finished champions and runners-up in the Ligue 1, the 1962–63 seasons.

USM Alger	Championship	MC Alger
International (Official)
–	CAF Champions League	1
2	CAF Confederation Cup	–
1	CAF Super Cup	–
3	Aggregate	1
Domestic (Official)
8	Algerian Ligue Professionnelle 1	10
10	Algerian Cup	8
–	League Cup	1
2	Algerian Super Cup	5
20	Aggregate	24
International (Defunct and Non-official)
–	Maghreb Cup Winners Cup (Defunct)	2
0	Aggregate	2
International (Non-official)
1	Arab Champions League	–
1	Aggregate	0
Domestic (Defunct)
–	League Algiers	2
–	Forconi Cup	2
0	Aggregate	4
23	Total Aggregate	31

== League matches ==
The matches listed below are only Algerian Ligue Professionnelle 1 matches, club name in bold indicates win. The score is given at full-time and half-time (in brackets), and in the goals columns, the goalscorer and time when goal was scored is noted.

#	Date	R.	Home team	Away team	Score	Goals (home)	Goals (away)
1	62–63	N/A	**USM Alger**	MC Alger	**2–1** (2–1)	Meziani 17', Krimo 40'	Laggoun 9'
2	62–63	N/A	**USM Alger**	MC Alger	**3–0** (0–0)	Ben Tifour 60', Krimo 73', Bernaoui 89'	—
3	63–64	8	**MC Alger**	USM Alger	**3–0** (0–0)	Aouadj 50', Lemoui 62' (pen.), Oucif 70'	—
4	63–64	23	USM Alger	MC Alger	**0–0** (0–0)	—	—
5	64–65	2	USM Alger	MC Alger	**0–0** (0–0)	—	—
6	64–65	17	MC Alger	**USM Alger**	**0–2**	Match not played (MCA suspended). Forfeit win USMA.	
7	65–66	4	MC Alger	**USM Alger**	**1–2** (0–0)	Benali 63'	Bousseloub 74' (o.g.), Bernaoui 75'
8	65–66	19	USM Alger	**MC Alger**	**1–3** (0–2)	Belbekri 53'	Benfadah 6', Saâdi 25', Oucif 68'
9	66–67	5	USM Alger	**MC Alger**	**1–3** (0–0)	Zemmour 65'	Alik 75', Amara 76', Oucif 88'
10	66–67	14	MC Alger	**USM Alger**	**0–1** (0–0)	—	Saâdi 48'
11	67–68	6	**MC Alger**	USM Alger	**3–1** (3–1)	Hassen Tahir 5', 33', Oucif 30'	Belbekri 42'
12	67–68	17	USM Alger	**MC Alger**	**1–3** (0–1)	Guittoun 48'	Betrouni 10', 50', Hassen Tahir 76'
from 1968 to 1969 USM Alger second division.
13	69–70	6	**MC Alger**	USM Alger	**2–1** (0–1)	Amrous 40', Hassen Tahir 74'	Tchalabi 89'
14	69–70	17	USM Alger	**MC Alger**	**1–2** (1–1)	Guittoun 27'	Mesbah 3', Zerrouk 77'
15	70–71	6	USM Alger	MC Alger	**2–2** (1–2)	Attoui 19', Tchalabi 54'	Mesbah 21', 43'
16	70–71	17	MC Alger	**USM Alger**	**1–2** (0–2)	Zerrouk 63'	Meziani 6', Tchalabi 34'
17	71–72	11	USM Alger	**MC Alger**	**1–3** (0–1)	Hamici 50'	Tahir 32', Betrouni 78', 89'
18	71–72	26	MC Alger	**USM Alger**	**0–1** (0–1)	—	Tchalabi 39'
From 1972 to 1974 USM Alger second division.
19	74–75	15	**MC Alger**	USM Alger	**3–0** (3–0)	Zenir 23', 40', Betrouni 33'	—
20	74–75	30	USM Alger	MC Alger	**1–1** (0–0)	Zidane 76'	Azzouz 67' (pen.)
21	75–76	10	USM Alger	MC Alger	**1–1** (1–1)	Keddou 42'	Azzouz 27' (pen.)
22	75–76	25	MC Alger	**USM Alger**	**0–1** (0–0)	—	Guedioura 74'
23	76–77	7	MC Alger	USM Alger	**1–1** (0–1)	Aït Hamouda 75'	Guedioura 34'
24	76–77	20	USM Alger	**MC Alger**	**1–2** (1–0)	Ali Messaoud 71'	Zenir 17', Bachi 82'
25	77–78	5	MP Alger	USK Alger	**1–1** (0–0)	Bousri 46'	Rabet 66'
26	77–78	18	USK Alger	MP Alger	**0–0** (0–0)	—	—
27	78–79	4	MP Alger	USK Alger	**3–3** (1–2)	Bouiche 14', Zenir 84', Bachi 86'	Guedioura 10', Rabet 28', Amenouche 68'
28	78–79	17	USK Alger	**MP Alger**	**1–2** (1–0)	Habouche 58'	Betrouni 25', Bousri 83' (pen.)
29	79–80	11	USK Alger	MP Alger	**0–0** (0–0)	—	—
30	79–80	26	MP Alger	**USK Alger**	**0–2** (0–0)	—	Chaâbane 47', Rabet 86'
From 1980 to 1981 USM Alger second division.
31	81–82	2	USK Alger	MP Alger	**0–0** (0–0)	—	—
32	81–82	17	**MP Alger**	USK Alger	**2–1** (0–0)	Bousri (?), Khellaf 87'	Boutamine 70'
33	82–83	6	MP Alger	USK Alger	**0–0** (0–0)	—	—
34	82–83	21	**USK Alger**	MP Alger	**2–1** (1–0)	Azzouz 2', Rabet 69'	Bousri 85'
From 1983 to 1985 USM Alger second division.
35	85–86	N/A	**MP Alger**	USK Alger	**4–1** (1–0)	Bousri 31', 51', Bencheikh 64', Bouiche 65'	Lalili 56' (pen.)
36	85–86	N/A	USK Alger	MP Alger	**1–1** (0–0)	Laâouada 69'	Belhadj 80'
From 1986 to 1987 USM Alger second division.
37	87–88	7	USK Alger	MP Alger	**1–1** (0–1)	Bouiche (?)	Benkhalidi (?)
38	87–88	24	MP Alger	USK Alger	**1–1** (0–0)	Djahmoun 80'	Mouassi 86' (o.g.)
39	88–89	10	USK Alger	**MP Alger**	**1–2** (1–1)	Benkhalidi 44'	Belaouchet 8', 79'
40	88–89	25	**MP Alger**	USK Alger	**2–0** (0–0)	Belaouchet 66', Maïche 83'	—
41	89–90	7	USM Alger	MC Alger	**0–0** (0–0)	—	—
42	89–90	22	MC Alger	USM Alger	**1–1** (1–1)	Abdellaoui 37' (o.g.)	Hammaz 17'
From 1990 to 1995 USM Alger second division.
43	95–96	7	**USM Alger**	MC Alger	**1–0** (1–0)	Zekri 1'	—
44	95–96	22	**MC Alger**	USM Alger	**1–0** (0–0)	Aït Tahar 54'	—
45	96–97	6	**MC Alger**	USM Alger	**2–0** (1–0)	Tebbal 11', M.Dob 89'	—
46	96–97	21	**USM Alger**	MC Alger	**3–1** (1–0)	Hadj Adlane 5', 81', Nazef 51' (o.g.)	Dahmani 68' (pen.)
47	97–98	1	USM Alger	MC Alger	**0–0** (0–0)	—	—
48	97–98	8	MC Alger	**USM Alger**	**0–1** (0–1)	—	Mehdaoui 31'
49	98–99	7	USM Alger	MC Alger	**2–2** (1–0)	Saïfi 60', Gacemi 74'	Hadj Adlane 17', Hamdoud 83'
50	98–99	20	MC Alger	USM Alger	**0–0** (0–0)	—	—
51	99–00	5	USM Alger	**MC Alger**	**0–1** (0–0)	—	Benzerga 55'
52	99–00	16	MC Alger	**USM Alger**	**0–1** (0–1)	—	Abacha 16'
53	00–01	8	MC Alger	USM Alger	**0–0** (0–0)	—	—
54	00–01	23	USM Alger	MC Alger	**1–1** (0–0)	Amirat 67'	Bouras 60'
55	01–02	6	**USM Alger**	MC Alger	**2–1** (1–0)	Bourahli 3', Ghazi 65'	M.Dob 74'
56	01–02	21	MC Alger	USM Alger	**0–0** (0–0)	—	—
From 2002 to 2003 MC Alger second division.
57	03–04	26	**USM Alger**	MC Alger	**1–0** (0–0)	Metref 90'	—
58	03–04	11	MC Alger	**USM Alger**	**1–3** (1–2)	Benali 2'	Achiou 25', Hamdoud 45' (pen.), 88' (pen.)
59	04–05	8	MC Alger	**USM Alger**	**1–2** (1–2)	Daham 7'	Diallo 11', Achiou 26'
60	04–05	23	USM Alger	**MC Alger**	**1–2** (1–1)	Dziri 9'	Daham 26', 61'
61	05–06	7	MC Alger	USM Alger	**1–1** (1–0)	Bouzid 18'	Eneramo 90+5'
62	05–06	22	**USM Alger**	MC Alger	**1–0** (1–0)	Metref 10'	—
63	06–07	7	USM Alger	MC Alger	**2–2** (1–1)	Zidane 6', Bensaïd 67'	Bouguèche 35', Coulibaly 62'
64	06–07	22	MC Alger	USM Alger	**0–0** (0–0)	—	—
65	07–08	7	USM Alger	**MC Alger**	**0–2** (0–2)	—	Badji 26', Younes 40'
66	07–08	22	**MC Alger**	USM Alger	**1–0** (1–0)	Coulibaly 8'	—
67	08–09	8	MC Alger	USM Alger	**0–0** (0–0)	—	—
68	08–09	24	**USM Alger**	MC Alger	**3–0** (0–0)	Dziri 49', Hamidi 56', 65'	—
69	09–10	9	MC Alger	USM Alger	**0–0** (0–0)	—	—
70	09–10	26	USM Alger	**MC Alger**	**1–2** (0–1)	Hamidi 90+2'	Derrag 43', Saïdoune 73' (o.g.)
71	10–11	7	MC Alger	USM Alger	**0–0** (0–0)	—	—
72	10–11	22	USM Alger	**MC Alger**	**1–2** (0–1)	Meklouche 58'	Zeddam 5', Sofiane 57'
73	11–12	11	**MC Alger**	USM Alger	**1–0** (0–0)	Zeddam 72'	—
74	11–12	26	**USM Alger**	MC Alger	**3–1** (1–0)	Feham 25', Djediat 46', 81' (pen.)	Yalaoui 90+2'
75	12–13	3	**USM Alger**	MC Alger	**1–0** (0–0)	Gasmi 67'	—
76	12–13	18	**MC Alger**	USM Alger	**1–0** (0–0)	Djallit 76'	—
77	13–14	5	**USM Alger**	MC Alger	**1–0** (1–0)	Gasmi 12' (pen.)	—
78	13–14	20	MC Alger	**USM Alger**	**0–3** (0–1)	—	Ziaya 39', Chafaï 47', Gasmi 82'
79	14–15	11	MC Alger	**USM Alger**	**0–1** (0–0)	—	Baïteche 47'
80	14–15	26	USM Alger	MC Alger	**0–0** (0–0)	—	—
81	15–16	11	USM Alger	MC Alger	**0–0** (0–0)	—	—
82	15–16	26	MC Alger	USM Alger	**2–2** (0–1)	Hachoud 79', 87'	Nadji 26', Darfalou 67'
83	16–17	7	**MC Alger**	USM Alger	**2–1** (1–0)	Zerdab 38', 77' (pen.)	Guessan 87'
84	16–17	22	USM Alger	MC Alger	**2–2** (2–2)	Meftah 21', Benyahia 25'	Seguer 4', Bouguèche 10'
85	17–18	6	MC Alger	**USM Alger**	**0–2** (0–0)	—	Benmoussa 56' (pen.), Darfalou 84'
86	17–18	21	USM Alger	MC Alger	**2–2** (2–0)	Darfalou 1', Bouderbal 19'	Bendebka 56', Hachoud 71'
87	18–19	9	USM Alger	MC Alger	**0–0** (0–0)	—	—
88	18–19	24	**MC Alger**	USM Alger	**3–2** (1–0)	Benaldjia 41', Bendebka 56', Lamara 89' (pen.)	Zouari 52', Benyahia 85'
	19–20	4	MC Alger	USM Alger	**Cancelled**	(Note: USM Alger were deducted 3 points due to their withdrawal in their game against MC Alger. The decision has been appealed to the Court of Arbitration for Sport. On 28 August 2020, after postponing several times the final decision was made without appeal, which is to return the three points and repeat the match.)	
89	19–20	19	USM Alger	**MC Alger**	**0–1** (0–0)	—	Frioui 61'
90	20–21	12	USM Alger	MC Alger	**2–2** (1–1)	Koudri 4', Belaïd 55'	Belkheir 45', Bouchina 80' (o.g.)
91	20–21	31	MC Alger	USM Alger	**2–2** (2–0)	Abdelhafid 27', 45+4'	Zouari 49', Belkacemi 72' (pen.)
92	21–22	13	USM Alger	MC Alger	**1–1** (0–0)	Meziane 52'	Zaidi 65'
93	21–22	30	MC Alger	**USM Alger**	**0–1** (0–0)	—	Benhammouda 56'
94	22–23	8	**MC Alger**	USM Alger	**1–0** (0–0)	Benabdi 67'	—
95	22–23	23	**USM Alger**	MC Alger	**2–0** (1–0)	Belkacemi 40', Loucif 63'	—
96	23–24	11	USM Alger	MC Alger	**0–0** (0–0)	—	—
97	23–24	26	**MC Alger**	USM Alger	**1–0** (1–0)	Zougrana 23'	—
98	24–25	7	USM Alger	**MC Alger**	**0–3** (0–0)	—	Messoussa 49', Kipre 57', Bayazid 90+12'
99	24–25	22	**MC Alger**	USM Alger	**1–0** (1–0)	Bouras 33'	—
100	25–26	2	USM Alger	MC Alger	**0–0** (0–0)	—	—
101	25–26	17	**MC Alger**	USM Alger	**1–0** (1–0)	Ferhat 14'	—

== Algerian Cup results ==
#	Date	Round	Home team	Score	Away team	Goals (home)	Goals (away)
1	1940–41	Round of 32	MC Alger	4–1 (2–0)	USM Alger	Hahad 12', 53', Kaci 18', Abdoun 71'	Djaknoun 62'
2	1947–48	Quarter-final	MC Alger	2–0 (0–0)	USM Alger	Hahad 49', El Mahdaoui 64'	—
3	1949–50	Round of 16	MC Alger	5–1 (3–0)	USM Alger	Khelil 15', Bennour 35', Azzef 40', 55', Derriche 87'	Zouaoui 90+1'
4	1970–71	Final	USM Alger	0–2 (0–2)	MC Alger	—	Betrouni 5', Bachi 36'
5	1972–73	Final	USM Alger	2–4 (1–1)	MC Alger	Attoui 18', 120'	Bachi 36', Kaoua 96', Bousri 106', Betrouni 116'
6	1974–75	Round of 32	MC Alger	1–0 (0–0)	USM Alger	Bousri 87'	—
7	1976–77	Round of 16	USM Alger	1–0 (a.e.t. (0–0))	MC Alger	Deraoui 93'	—
8	1981–82	Quarter-final	MP Alger	4–4 (a.e.t. p. 3–0)	USK Alger	Bousri 29', 77', Bellemou 30', Mahiouz 104'	Boutamine 9', 82', Guedioura 79', Ali Messaoud 91'
9	1985–86	Round of 64	MP Alger	1–0 (0–0)	USK Alger	Sebbar 84' (pen.)	—
10	1986–87	Round of 64	MP Alger	1–0 (0–0)	USK Alger	Mekhloufi 64'	—
11	1998–99	Semi-final	USM Alger	2–2 (a.e.t. p. 5–4)	MC Alger	Hamdani 21' (pen.), Yacef 113'	Saïfi 14', Rahmouni 119'
12	2005–06	Final	MC Alger	2–1 (1–0)	USM Alger	Daham 42', 50' (pen.)	Doucouré 85'
13	2006–07	Final	MC Alger	1–0 (0–0)	USM Alger	Hadjadj 70'	—
14	2009–10	Round of 16	USM Alger	0–3 (0–0)	MC Alger	—	Bedbouda 64', Derrag 69', Zemmamouche 90+2' (pen.)
15	2012–13	Final	USM Alger	1–0 (1–0)	MC Alger	Benmoussa 18'	—

== League Cup results ==
#	Date	Round	Home team	Score	Away team	Goals (home)	Goals (away)
1	31 January 2000	Centre Group	USM Alger	0–1 (0–0)	MC Alger	—	M.Dob 61'
2	8 May 2021	Round of 16	USM Alger	2–0 (1–0)	MC Alger	Opoku 19', Naidji 90+2'	—

== Super Cup results ==
#	Date	Round	Home team	Score	Away team	Goals (home)	Goals (away)
1	9 August 2014	Final	USM Alger	0–1 (0–0)	MC Alger	—	Aouedj 82'
2	1 November 2016	Final	USM Alger	2–0 (0–0)	MC Alger	Chafaï 61', Meftah 77' (pen.)	—
3	17 January 2026	Final	MC Alger	1–0 (0–0)	USM Alger	Naidji 74'	—

== Red cards ==
Including all the Ligue 1, Algerian Cup and Super Cup games since 1962–63.

Season	Match	Red cards for USM Alger players (18)	Red cards for MC Alger players (14)
1963–64	USM Alger – MC Alger 0–0	Meziani 37'	Maârouf 37'
1969–70	MC Alger – USM Alger 2–1	Debbah 74' Meziani 74'	Betrouni 74' Cheikh 74'
1995–96	USM Alger – MC Alger 1–0		Cherouk ?'
1998–99 (Cup)	MC Alger – USM Alger 2–2		Ouahid ?'
1999–00	USM Alger – MC Alger 0–1	Djahnine 25' M. Meftah 40'	Lazizi 40'
2000–01	MC Alger – USM Alger 0–0	M. Meftah 71' Dziri 74'	
2001–02	USM Alger – MC Alger 2–1	Djahnine 48' Ghazi 65'	
2003–04	MC Alger – USM Alger 1–3		Bouacida 78'
2004–05	USM Alger – MC Alger 1–2		Babouche 70'
2005–06	MC Alger – USM Alger 1–1		Belaïd 36'
2005–06 (Cup)	MC Alger – USM Alger 2–1	Ghazi 40'	
2006–07	USM Alger – MC Alger 2–2	Zidane 82'	
2006–07 (Cup)	USM Alger – MC Alger 0–1	Hanitser 90+4'	Coulibaly 90+4'
2007–08	USM Alger – MC Alger 0–2	Doucoure 44'	Chaoui 60'
2009–10	MC Alger – USM Alger 0–0	Zidane 40'	
2009–10 (Cup)	MC Alger – USM Alger 3–0	Dziri 88'	
2011–12	MC Alger – USM Alger 1–0	Bouchema 36'	
2012–13	MC Alger – USM Alger 1–0	Benmoussa 89' Koudri 90+4'	
2016–17 (Super Cup)	USM Alger – MC Alger 2–0		Boudebouda 64'
2018–19	USM Alger – MC Alger 0–0		Amada 74'
2020–21 (League Cup)	USM Alger – MC Alger 2–0		Rebiai 90+3'

== Shared player history ==
=== Players who have played for both clubs ===
- (Algeria) Nassim Bouchema (MC Alger 2007–11, USM Alger 2011–16)
- (Algeria) Brahim Boudebouda (MC Alger 2008–11 & 2016–18, USM Alger 2011–16)
- (Algeria) Ismaël Bouzid (MC Alger 2005–06, USM Alger 2012–13)
- (Algeria) Omar Betrouni (MC Alger 1967–80, USM Alger 1980–83)
- (Algeria) Noureddine Daham (MC Alger 2003–06, USM Alger 2009–13)
- (Algeria) Larbi Hosni (MC Alger 2006–08, USM Alger 2008–09)
- (Algeria) Lahcène Nazef (MC Alger 1992–97, USM Alger 2003–05)
- (Algeria) Amir Sayoud (MC Alger 2012, USM Alger 2016–18)
- (Algeria) Amokrane Oualiken (MC Alger 1962–63, USM Alger 1963–69)
- (Algeria) Hamza Koudri (MC Alger 2006–12, USM Alger 2012–22)
- (Algeria) Toufik Zeghdane (MC Alger 2013–16, USM Alger 2016–17)
- (Algeria) Merouane Abdouni (USM Alger 2002–05 & 2007–11, MC Alger 2005–07)
- (Algeria) Amar Ammour (USM Alger 2002–09, MC Alger 1996–98 & 2010–11)
- (Algeria) Farouk Belkaïd (USM Alger 2005–06, MC Alger 2006–08)
- (Algeria) Abdelkader Besseghir (USM Alger 2004–08, MC Alger 2008–14)
- (Algeria) Antar Boucherit (USM Alger 2006–08, MC Alger 2014 & 2016)
- (Algeria) Karim Ghazi (USM Alger 1995–2004 & 2005–11, MC Alger 2011–14)
- (Algeria) Hocine Metref (USM Alger 2002–08, MC Alger 2012–14)
- (Algeria) Mouaouia Meklouche (USM Alger 2008–13, MC Alger 2013)
- (Algeria) Mohamed Seguer (USM Alger 2012–16, MC Alger 2016–18)
- (Algeria) Hamza Yacef (USM Alger 1997–2001, MC Alger 2008–09)
- (Algeria) Zakaria Haddouche (USM Alger 2019, MC Alger 2018–19)
- (Algeria) Farouk Chafaï (USM Alger 2011–19, MC Alger 2019)
- (Algeria) Lamine Zemmamouche (USM Alger 2004–09 & 2011–23, MC Alger 2009–11)
- (Algeria) Samy Frioui (USM Alger 2010–15, MC Alger 2019–22)
- (Algeria) Abdelraouf Benguit (USM Alger 2016–19, MC Alger 2022)
- (Algeria) Ayoub Abdellaoui (USM Alger 2013–18, MC Alger 2022–present)
- (Algeria) Zakaria Naidji (USM Alger 2021, MC Alger 2023–present)
- (Algeria) Youcef Belaïli (USM Alger 2014–15, MC Alger 2023–24)
- (Algeria) Mohamed Benkhemassa (USM Alger 2014–19, MC Alger 2023–present)
- (Algeria) Zinedine Ferhat (USM Alger 2011–16, MC Alger 2025–present)
- (Algeria) Alexis Guendouz (USM Alger 2020–22, MC Alger 2025–present)

=== Played for one, managed the other ===
- (Algeria) Djamel Menad (as player USM Alger, as manager MC Alger, USM Alger)

=== Managed both clubs ===
Manager	USM Alger career						MC Alger career					
Manager	Span	G	W	D	L	Win %	Span	G	W	D	L	Win %
(Algeria) Mustapha Heddane	1997; 2000	?	?	?	?		20??–20??	?	?	?	?	
(Algeria) Djamel Menad	2005	12	6	4	2	50.00	2012–2013; 2016	36; 9	20; 4	8; 2	8; 3	55.56; 44.44
(Algeria) Noureddine Saâdi	1996–1997; 2000–2002; 2004; 2009–2010	? 70; 18; 34	? 42; 12; 16	? 17; 2; 11	? 11; 4; 7	? 60; 66.67; 47.06	2002–2003; 2006	43 ?	27 ?	8 ?	8 ?	62.79
(Algeria) Amokrane Oualiken	1967–1969	?	?	?	?		1989–1990	18	8	6	4	44.44
(Algeria) Meziane Ighil	2012	14	6	6	2	42.86	2015–2016	13	6	4	3	46.15

== Algerian Ligue Professionnelle 1 results ==
The tables list the place each team took in each of the seasons.

Season	64–65	65–66	66–67	67–68	68–69	69–70	70–71	71–72	72–73	73–74	74–75	75–76	76–77	77–78	78–79	79–80	80–81	81–82	82–83	83–84	84–85	85–86	86–87	87–88	88–89	89–90	90–91	91–92	92–93	93–94	94–95	95–96	96–97	97–98	98–99	99–00	00–01	01–02	02–03	03–04	04–05	05–06	06–07	07–08	08–09	09–10	10–11	11–12	12–13	13–14	14–15	15–16	16–17	17–18	18–19	19–20	20–21	21–22	22–23	23–24	24–25	25–26
No. of teams	16	16	12	12	12	12	12	16	16	16	16	16	14	14	14	16	15	16	16	16	20	20	20	18	16	16	16	16	16	16	16	16	16	16	14	12	16	16	16	16	16	16	16	16	17	18	16	16	16	16	16	16	16	16	16	16	20	18	16	16	16	16
USM Alger	16	x	x	x	x	5	5	15	x	x	5	4	11	5	12	15	x	9	16	x	x	x	x	7	13	16	x	x	x	x	x	1	3	2	4	12	2	1	1	2	1	2	4	4	6	4	9	3	4	1	8	1	3	6	1	6	4	4	11	4	7	10
MC Alger	14	x	x	x	4	2	3	1	3	5	1	1	5	1	1	8	5	10	4	4	18	x	9	13	2	3	5	7	7	7	5	8	6	5	1	11	14	15	x	4	3	6	11	7	5	1	10	6	5	7	11	12	2	5	6	2	7	8	3	1	1	1

== Basketball Section ==
Algiers basketball derby
- Other names: MC Alger vs. USM Alger
- Location: Algiers, Algeria
- Teams: MC Alger; USM Alger
- Latest meeting: USM Alger 74–65 MC Alger; Super Division (27 December 2025)
- Stadiums: Salle OMS Abdelaziz Ben Tifour (MC Alger); Salle OMS Mourad Boukechoura (USM Alger)

The basketball derby between Mouloudia Club d'Alger and USM Alger is one of the most historic and symbolic rivalries in Algerian sport. Rooted in the broader football rivalry between the two clubs, their confrontations on the basketball court have developed their own identity, blending sporting competition with deep social and cultural significance.

=== Origins and Early Encounters ===
USM Alger lineups for the 1949-50 season.

The rivalry dates back to the early decades following Algerian independence, when basketball began to organize itself nationally. Both Mouloudia Club d'Alger and USM Alger quickly established themselves as important multisport institutions, investing in basketball sections that competed in the national championships. Their early meetings were often intense, reflecting not only sporting ambition but also the rivalry between two clubs representing different districts and identities within Algiers.

=== Statistical Dominance in the MCA–USMA Basketball Derby ===
The basketball rivalry between MC Alger and USM Alger is deeply rooted in the history of Algerian sport. While their football rivalry is more widely known, their basketball sections have also written an important chapter in the development of the game in Algeria, marked by contrasting trajectories and a significant imbalance in titles. From the early years after independence, both clubs established basketball teams as part of their multisport structures. USM Alger was among the early forces of Algerian basketball, enjoying its first golden era in the 1960s, when it won three consecutive National championships (1965–66, 1966–67, 1968–69).

This period cemented USMA’s place among the founding powers of the discipline. The club later added a fourth league title in 2022–23 ended a 54-year title drought by winning the title at the Hamou Boutlélis Sports Palace in Oran. The team secured the title by defeating WO Boufarik in the final match of the playoff tournament.. In cup competitions, USMA’s success remained more limited, with a historic Algerian Cup victory in 2023–24, although the club reached several finals across different decades.

In parallel, the women’s section of USM Alger also contributed to the club’s legacy, winning three National championships (1968–69, 1985–86, 1990–91) and two Algerian Cups (1978–79, 1985–86). Despite fewer titles compared to their rivals, USM Alger’s repeated appearances in finals highlight a tradition of competitiveness and resilience. In contrast, Mouloudia Club d'Alger developed into the dominant force of Algerian basketball, particularly from the 1980s onward. The club’s men’s team amassed an impressive 21 national league titles and 20 Algerian Cups, establishing one of the most successful domestic records in the country. Their dominance was especially evident during the 2000s and 2010s, when MCA frequently completed league and cup doubles, reinforcing its status as the benchmark of Algerian basketball.

Mouloudia Club d'Alger also achieved success beyond national borders. The club won the Maghreb Champions Clubs Championship twice (1986 and 1987) and reached the final again in 1988. It also performed strongly in Arab Club Basketball Championship, finishing as runner-up in 1987, 2001, 2002 and 2015. These international results further enhanced Mouloudia Club d'Alger’s reputation as a leading club in the region. The women’s team of MC Alger mirrored this dominance on the domestic scene, winning 13 league titles and 6 Algerian Cups, particularly excelling in the 2010s. Internationally, the team achieved a major milestone by winning the Arab Clubs Championship in 2016, while also finishing third in 2014 and 2015.

Overall, the contrast between the two clubs is reflected clearly in their trophy counts. Mouloudia Club d'Alger has accumulated over 60 domestic titles across men’s and women’s basketball, compared to 10 for USM Alger. This gap illustrates Mouloudia Club d'Alger’s long-term structural strength and sustained success, while USMA’s honours are more concentrated in specific periods, notably the 1960s and the recent resurgence of the 2020s. Despite this imbalance, the rivalry remains meaningful. Matches between MC Alger and USM Alger are not defined solely by titles, but by history, identity, and the enduring competitive spirit between two of Algiers’ most emblematic clubs. Their encounters continue to connect generations, linking the pioneers of the 1960s to the modern era of Algerian basketball.

=== Modern Era and Continuity ===
In recent years, although Algerian basketball has evolved with new dominant clubs, the MCA–USMA derby continues to hold emotional weight. Even when both teams are not competing for titles, their encounters remain fiercely contested and widely followed. The rivalry endures not just because of trophies, but because it represents continuity linking generations of players and supporters who have experienced the derby in different eras.

=== Results ===
==== Super Division ====
#	Season	Date	Round	Home team	Score	Away team	Ref
	1965–66	?	?	USM Alger	87 – 68	MC Alger	
	1967–68	?	?	MC Alger	68 – 88	USM Alger	
Between 1968 and 1977, Mouloudia Club d'Alger was inactive
	1995–96	February, 1 1996	6	USM Alger	?? – ??	MC Alger	
	1995–96		15	MC Alger	?? – ??	USM Alger	
	1996–97	?	?	MC Alger	99 – 85	USM Alger	
	1997–98	?	?	USM Alger	57 – 70	MC Alger	
	1999–2000	December 17, 1999	?	MC Alger	74 – 60	USM Alger	
Between 2000–01 and 2009–10, USM Alger played in the second division
	2010–11	?	?	USM Alger	72 – 115	GS Pétroliers	
	2010–11	?	?	GS Pétroliers	79 – 51	USM Alger	
In 2011–12 season, USM Alger played in the second division
	2012–13	?	?	USM Alger	60 – 98	GS Pétroliers	
	2012–13	?	?	GS Pétroliers	73 – 45	USM Alger	
During the 2013–14 season, the two teams were placed in different groups
Between 2014–15 and 2016–17, USM Alger played in the second division
	2017–18	January 13, 2018	15	USM Alger	58 – 88	GS Pétroliers	
	2017–18	April 27, 2018	30	GS Pétroliers	76 – 58	USM Alger	
	2018–19	?	?	USM Alger	?? – ??	GS Pétroliers	
	2018–19	?	?	GS Pétroliers	?? – ??	USM Alger	
During the 2021–22 season, the two teams were placed in different groups
	2022–23	December 16, 2022	8	MC Alger	76 – 69	USM Alger	
	2022–23	?	?	USM Alger	?? – ??	MC Alger	
	2023–24	November 10, 2023	3	MC Alger	68 – 71	USM Alger	
	2023–24	March 8, 2024	18	USM Alger	45 – 61	MC Alger	
	2024–25	January 10, 2025	8	MC Alger	70 – 62	USM Alger	Boxscore
	2024–25	April 11, 2025	21	USM Alger	71 – 58	MC Alger	
	2025–26	September 26, 2025	3	MC Alger	69 – 68	USM Alger	Boxscore
	2025–26	December 27, 2025	16	USM Alger	74 – 65	MC Alger	Boxscore
	2026–27	October 10, 2026	5	USM Alger	78 – 90	MC Alger	Boxscore
	2026–27	2027	18	MC Alger	–	USM Alger	[ Boxscore]

==== Super Division Playoffs ====
#	Season	Date	Round	Home team	Score	Away team	Ref
	2022–23	June 8, 2023	1	USM Alger	68 – 65	MC Alger	
	2023–24	June 20, 2024	3	MC Alger	77 – 70	USM Alger	Boxscore

==== Algerian Cup ====
#	Season	Date	Round	Home team	Score	Away team	Ref
	1987–88	May, 26 1988	SF	MC Alger	80 – 69	USM Alger	
	1988–89	June 15, 1989	F	MC Alger	77 – 66	USM Alger	
	1996–97	April, 25 1997	R16	USM Alger	70 – 59	MC Alger	
	2011–12	June, 8 2012	QF	GS Pétroliers	?? – ??	USM Alger	

=== Honours ===
- Numbers with this background indicate the record in the competition.

MC Alger	Competition	USM Alger
Domestic men's
21	Super Division	4
20	Algerian Cup	1
0	Algerian Super Cup	0
41	Aggregate	5
Domestic women's
13	National 1	3
7	Algerian Women's Cup	2
0	Algerian Women's Super Cup	0
20	Aggregate	5
61	Total aggregate	10
