= Jamil Benouahi =

Moroccan footballer (born 1979)

Personal information
- Date of birth: 30 March 1979 (age 47)
- Place of birth: Fez, Morocco
- Position: Defensive midfielder

Senior career*
Years	Team	Apps	(Gls)
2002–2003	Racing Jet Wavre		
2003–2004	Royal Géants athois		
2004–2005	Boussu Dour		
2005–2006	AFC Tubize		
2006–2007	Louviéroise		
2007–2008	Boussu Dour		
2008–2009	Mechelen		
2009–2010	KFCO Wilrijk		
2010–2011	URS Centre		
2011	HeppigLambFleur		
2011–2012	Louviéroise		
2012–2014	Wallonia Walhain		
2014–2015	Racing Jet Wavre		

Managerial career
- 2012-2015: Qatar SC (Youth Coach)
- 2015-2018: Qatar SC (Academy Director)
- 2018-2019: Al Shamal SC (Assistant)
- 2019-2020: Al-Fujairah SC (Assistant)
- 2020-2022: MAS Fes (Technical Director)
- 2022: USM Alger (Caretaker)
- 2022: USM Alger
- 2023: Jeddah
- 2024-: AS FAR Rabat (Assistant)
- * Club domestic league appearances and goals

Jamil Benouahi (Arabic: جميل بن واحي; born 30 March 1979 in Fez) is a Moroccan football manager and former player who is currently assistant coach at Moroccan Botola Pro club AS FAR.

Benouahi have spent most of his playing career in Belgium, obtaining Belgian nationality after arriving in the country in 1997. From the start of his career, the young defensive midfielder turned to the other side of the mirror training young people, the bench. 25 years later he saw his first real experience as a head coach in a big club at USM Alger.

== Managerial career ==
On 9 February 2022, USM Alger contracted with Zlatko Krmpotić to be the new coach and to be his assistant Jamil Benouahi. and with the successive negative results Achour Djelloul, the club’s president, decided to dismiss Krmpotić from his position. and decided to rely on his assistant Benouahi to complete the season. His start was good as Benouahi led the club to its first victory after two months, after which in the Algiers Derby, Benouahi achieved an important and unexpected victory that allows the club to search for a continental participation, and after the fifth win in a row Benouahi stated that he wishes to stay in the club, but the decision is up to them and that he has become a fan of this team. At the end of the season Benouahi declared that they had a difficult week after the death of Billel Benhammouda. and we achieved the goal of qualifying for the Confederation Cup next season, and that he would return to his family and see his children and wait for the administration's decision about his future. On 6 July 2022, it is official Benouahi extended his contract for another year to remain the head coach for the new season. On 4 August 2022, the leaders of USM Alger have put an end to the functions of the technical staff of Benouahi, were dismissed from their posts after a hearing before the disciplinary board.

On 18 February 2023, Benouahi was appointed as manager of Saudi Arabian club Jeddah.

In October 2024, he became the assistant coach at 13-time Moroccan Botola Pro champions, AS FAR.

== Managerial statistics ==
As of match played 17 June 2022

Key
*	Caretaker

Team	Nat	From	To	Record				
Team	Nat	From	To	P	W	D	L	Win %
USM Alger ^{*}	(Algeria)	18 April 2022	17 June 2022	8	6	0	2	75.00
USM Alger	(Algeria)	6 July 2022	3 August 2022	0	0	0	0	—
Jeddah	(Saudi Arabia)	18 February 2023	27 April 2023	0	0	0	0	—
Career Total				8	6	0	2	75.00
