= 2013 UAFA Club Cup final =

- Stade du 5 Juillet in Algiers hosted the second leg of the final
- Event: 2012–13 UAFA Club Cup
Al-Arabi SC	USM Alger
(Kuwait)	(Algeria)
2	3

First leg
Al-Arabi SC	USM Alger
0	0
- Date: 24 April 2013
- Venue: Sabah Al-Salem Stadium, Al-Mansouriah
- Referee: Mohammad Arafah (Jordan)
- Attendance: 23,456

Second leg
USM Alger	Al-Arabi SC
3	2
- Date: 14 May 2013
- Venue: Stade 5 Juillet 1962, Algiers
- Referee: Khalil Jalal (Saudi Arabia)
- Attendance: 50,000

The 2013 UAFA Club Cup final was a football match which was played on 24 April and 14 May 2013. It was the 1st final of the UAFA Club Cup and the 26th of the Arab World's inter-club football tournament. The final was played as home and away matches, and it was contested between Al-Arabi SC of Kuwait and USM Alger of Algeria.

== Qualified teams ==
Team	Region	Previous finals appearances (bold indicates winners)
(Kuwait) Al-Arabi SC	WAFF (West Asia)	none
(Algeria) USM Alger	UNAF (North Africa)	none

== Venues ==
=== Sabah Al-Salem Stadium ===
Sabah al-Salem Stadium is a multi-purpose stadium in Kuwait City, Kuwait. It is currently used mostly for football matches and is the home stadium of Al Arabi Kuwait. The stadium holds 15,000 people and hosted many matches of the 1980 AFC Asian Cup, including the final.

=== Stade 5 Juillet 1962 ===
The 5 July 1962 Stadium (Arabic: ملعب 5 جويلية 1962) (the name refers to 5 July 1962, the day Algeria declared independence), is a football and athletics stadium located in Algiers, Algeria. The stadium was inaugurated in 1972 with a capacity of 95,000. It served as the main stadium of the 1975 Mediterranean Games, the 1978 All-Africa Games, the 2004 Pan Arab Games, and the 2007 All-Africa Games. The stadium was one of two venues of the 1990 African Cup of Nations (the other venue was the 19 May 1956 Stadium in Annaba). It hosted 9 matches of the tournament, including the final match, which had a second record attendance of 105,302 spectators. In the final match, the home team Algeria defeated Nigeria 1–0 to win the tournament. The record attendance is of 110,000 spectators in the friendly match between Algeria and Serbia on 3 March 2010. It also hosted the 2000 African Championships in Athletics. After a formal compliance with current safety standards in 1999, the stadium was reduced to an 80,200 capacity, and following a new phase of renovation in 2003.

== Road to final ==
Note: In all results below, the score of the finalist is given first (H: home; A: away).

(Kuwait) Al-Arabi SC				Round	(Algeria) USM Alger			
Opponent	Agg.	1st leg	2nd leg	Qualifying rounds	Opponent	Agg.	1st leg	2nd leg
(Saudi Arabia) Al-Fateh	5–4	3–2 (H)	2–2 (A)	Second round	(Mauritania) Tevragh-Zeina	4–1	0–2 (A)	2–1 (H)
(Saudi Arabia) Al-Nassr	4–3	3–2 (A)	2–0 (H)	Quarter-finals	(Jordan) Al-Baqa'a	9–3	1–6 (A)	3–2 (H)
(Morocco) Raja Casablanca	3–3 (a)	1–1 (H)	2–2 (A)	Semi-finals	(Egypt) Ismaily SC	0–0 (4–3 p)	0–0 (H)	0–0 (A)

== Format ==
The final was played on a home-and-away two-legged basis, with the order of legs decided by a draw, held after the group stage draw. If the aggregate score was tied after the second leg, the away goals rule would be applied, and if still level, the penalty shoot-out would be used to determine the winner (no extra time would be played).

== Matches ==
=== First leg ===
24 April 2013
20:00 UTC+3

Al-Arabi SC (Kuwait)	0–0	(Algeria) USM Alger
	Report

Sabah Al-Salem Stadium, Al-Mansouriah
Attendance: 23,456
Referee: Mohammad Arafah (Jordan)

**Al-Arabi SC**	**USM Alger**

Al-Arabi SC:
GK	(Kuwait) Sulaiman Abdulghafour
CB	(Kuwait) Mohamed Farih
CB	(Kuwait) Ahmed Saad Al Rashidi
CB	(Senegal) Mourtada Fall	(yellow card) 5'
RM	(Kuwait) Ali Maqseed
CM	(Kuwait) Abdullah Al Shemali
CM	(Kuwait) Fahd Al Hachach		(substituted off) 78'
LM	(Senegal) Kader Fall		(substituted off) 64'
RF	(Kuwait) Fahad Al-Rashidi	(yellow card) 33'
CF	(Jordan) Ahmad Hayel
LF	(Kuwait) Hussain Al-Moussawi
Substitutes:
DF	(Bahrain) Sayed Mohamed Adnan		(substituted on) 64'
MF	(Kuwait) Mohamed Djerragh		(substituted on) 78'
Manager:
(Portugal) José Romão

USM Alger:
GK	1	(Algeria) Lamine Zemmamouche
RB	4	(Algeria) Abdelkader Laïfaoui
CB	25	(Algeria) Mokhtar Benmoussa
CB	6	(Algeria) Farouk Chafaï	(yellow card) 81'
CB	20	(Algeria) Nacereddine Khoualed	(yellow card) 54'
LB	23	(Algeria) Hamza Koudri
CM	13	(Algeria) Nassim Bouchema
CM	14	(Algeria) Lamouri Djediat
CM	18	(Algeria) Saad Tedjar		(substituted off) 79'
CF	9	(Algeria) Noureddine Daham	(yellow card) 12'	(substituted off) 70'
CF	47	(Algeria) Zinedine Ferhat		(substituted off) 90'
Substitutes:
DF	24	(Algeria) Youcef Benamara		(substituted on) 79'
FW	12	(Madagascar) Carolus Andriamatsinoro		(substituted on) 70'
FW	48	(Algeria) Mohamed Seguer		(substituted on) 90'
Manager:
(France) Rolland Courbis

Assistant referees:
Ahmed Aroubli (Jordan)
Aïssa Attaoui (Jordan)
Fourth official:

**Match rules**

- 90 minutes.
- Seven named substitutes, of which up to three may be used.

=== Second leg ===
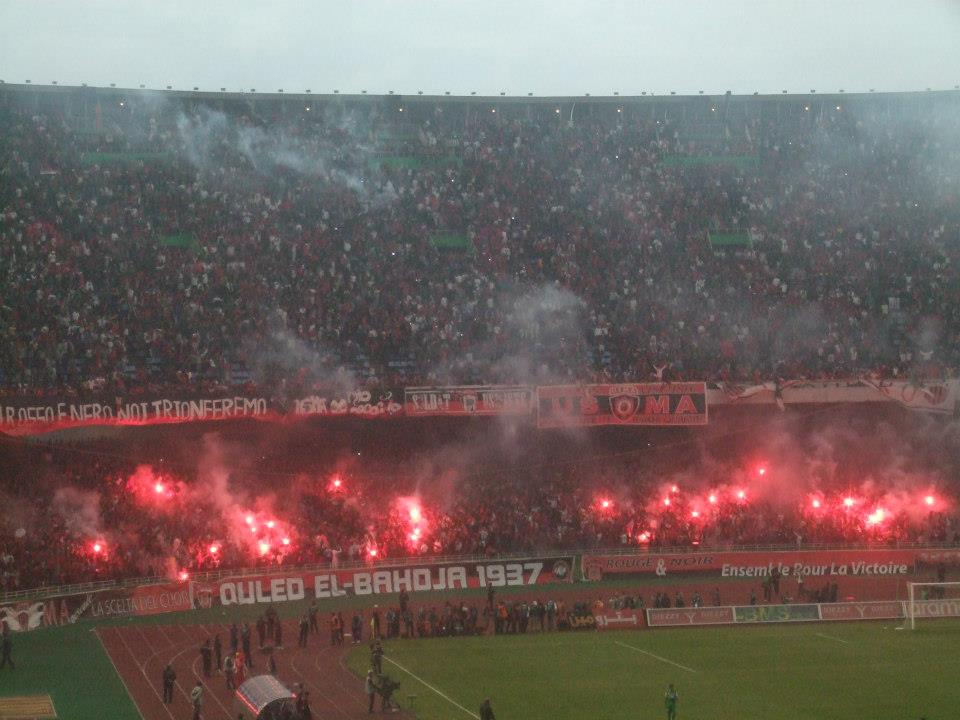
Ouled EL Bahdja fans during the final UAFA Club Cup, Stade 5 Juillet 1962 in Algiers, May 14, 2013 vs Al-Arabi SC.

The second leg took place at the Stade 5 Juillet 1962 in Algiers, in front of more than 50,000 supporters and several high ranking Algerian state officials, led by then Prime Minister Abdelmalek Sellal. The match was officiated by Saudi international referee Khalil Jalal. USM Alger defender Nacereddine Khoualed was absent due to suspension.

The first quarter of the match saw balanced play, with USM Alger slightly on the front foot. In the 13th minute, Noureddine Daham opened the scoring for USM Alger after receiving a pass from Bouazza Feham. In the 25th minute, Al-Arabi SC thought they had equalized through Mohamed Farih, but the goal was disallowed for offside a decision that replays showed to be questionable.

In the 33rd minute, Daham found himself one-on-one with goalkeeper Sulaiman Abdulghafour. His shot beat the keeper but struck the crossbar, narrowly missing a second goal. Four minutes later, after a cross from Mokhtar Benmoussa, Lamouri Djediat doubled USM Alger’s lead with a composed finish in the 37th minute. However, just before halftime, in the 42nd minute, Hamza Koudri was sent off following a dangerous tackle on an Al-Arabi SC player, leaving USM Alger with 10 men for the remainder of the match.

Al-Arabi SC came out strong in the second half, capitalizing on USM Alger’s defensive posture. In the 58th minute, Kader Fall pulled one back for the Kuwaiti side. Just three minutes later, Hussain Al-Moussawi leveled the score with a powerful long-range shot that beat goalkeeper Mohamed Lamine Zemmamouche.

Al-Moussawi had another golden opportunity in the 73rd minute when he found himself one-on-one with Zemmamouche but failed to convert. Just two minutes later, Carolus Andriamatsinoro was fouled inside the box, prompting referee Khalil Jalal to award a penalty to USM Alger. Captain Mohamed Rabie Meftah stepped up and calmly converted to restore his team’s lead.

In the 82nd minute, Zemmamouche made a crucial save to deny Al-Arabi a third goal. USM Alger held firm under pressure until the final whistle, securing the title the first UAFA Club Cup in the club's history. The trophy was presented by Prime Minister Sellal, in the presence of the Minister of Youth and Sports and the President of the Algerian Football Federation.

14 May 2013
17:30 UTC+1

USM Alger (Algeria)	3–2	(Kuwait) Al-Arabi SC
Daham 13'; Djediat 37'; Meftah 76' (pen.)	Report	58' K. Fall; 61' Al-Moussawi

Stade 5 Juillet 1962, Algiers
Attendance: 50,000
Referee: Khalil Jalal Al Ghamdi (Saudi Arabia)

**USM Alger**	**Al-Arabi SC**

USM Alger:
GK	1	(Algeria) Lamine Zemmamouche
RB	30	(Algeria) Rabie Meftah (c)		(yellow card) 62'
CB	6	(Algeria) Farouk Chafaï
CB	4	(Algeria) Abdelkader Laïfaoui
CB	25	(Algeria) Mokhtar Benmoussa
CB	26	(Algeria) Brahim Boudebouda		(yellow card) 90+2'
LB	23	(Algeria) Hamza Koudri		(yellow card) 26' (red card) 42'
CM	13	(Algeria) Nassim Bouchema		(yellow card) 61'
CM	14	(Algeria) Lamouri Djediat	(substituted off) 65'
CM	15	(Algeria) Bouazza Feham	(substituted off) 59'
CF	9	(Algeria) Noureddine Daham	(substituted off) 46'
Substitutes:
MF	11	(Algeria) Hocine El Orfi	(substituted on) 59'
FW	12	(Madagascar) Carolus Andriamatsinoro	(substituted on) 65'
FW	47	(Algeria) Zinedine Ferhat	(substituted on) 46'	(yellow card) 90'
Manager:
(France) Rolland Courbis

Al-Arabi SC:
GK	22	(Kuwait) Sulaiman Abdulghafour
CB	8	(Kuwait) Talal Nayef
CB	9	(Jordan) Ahmed Hayel
CB	30	(Senegal) Mourtada Fall
DM	24	(Kuwait) Abdullah Al Shemali
RM	11	(Kuwait) Hussain Al-Moussawi
CM	13	(Kuwait) Mohamed Farih
CM	19	(Kuwait) Ahmed Saad Al Rashidi		(yellow card) 90'
LM	31	(Kuwait) Ali Maqseed
SS	10	(Senegal) Kader Fall	(substituted off) 79'
CF		(Kuwait) Abdulaziz Al Salimi	(substituted off) 48'
Substitutes:
DF		(Bahrain) Sayed Mohamed Adnan	(substituted on) 79'
MF		(Kuwait) Mohamed Djerragh	(substituted on) 48'
Manager:
(Portugal) José Romão

Assistant referees:
Bader Al-Shamrani (Saudi Arabia)
Khaled Al Degairi (Saudi Arabia)
Fourth official:

**Match rules**

- 90 minutes.
- Penalty shoot-out if tied on aggregate and away goals.
- Seven named substitutes, of which up to three may be used.
