= Amokrane Oualiken =

Algerian footballer (1933–2010)

Personal information
- Date of birth: 6 April 1933
- Place of birth: Ben Aknoun, Algeria
- Date of death: 22 June 2010 (aged 77)
- Place of death: Ben Aknoun, Algeria
- Height: 1.72 m (5 ft 8 in)
- Position: Right winger

Youth career
- 1945–1950: ES Ben Aknoun
- 1952–1951: MC Alger

Senior career*
Years	Team	Apps	(Gls)
1951–1952	MC Alger		
1952–1953	Corporative Hussein-Dey		
1953–1954	FSGT Seine-Saint-Denis		
1954–1955	Tours		
1955–1956	Châteauroux		
1956–1957	Vélo Sport Chartrain		
1957–1960	Nîmes		
1960–1961	SO Montpellier	8	(2)
1962–1963	MC Alger		
1963–1967	USM Alger		

International career
- Algeria

Managerial career
- 1967–1969: USM Alger
- 1969–1970: ES Ben Aknoun
- 1970–1971: Union Sportive des Hospitaliers d'Alger
- 1971–1977: JS El Biar
- 1989–1990: MC Alger
- 1991–1992: Burkina Faso
- * Club domestic league appearances and goals

Amokrane "Da Mokrane" Oualiken (6 April 1933 – 22 June 2010) was an Algerian football player and manager. He played as a right winger.

== Club career ==
Oualiken was born in Ben Aknoun, Algiers, Algeria, on 6 April 1933.

He played for French club Nîmes Olympique where he became three-time Division 1 runner-up and reached the final of the Coupe de France.

After Algeria's independence in 1962, he played for MC Alger and USM Alger.

Oualiken died on 22 June 2010 in Ben Aknoun, Algiers, following a long illness.

== International career ==
In 1960, Oualiken became a member of the Algerian FLN team.

== Coaching career ==
Following his retirement from playing he started his coaching career with DNC Alger. He helped the amateur club win the 1981–82 Algerian Cup and promote to the Championnat National 1, the Algerian first tier, in 1985. He later coached the Burkina Faso national team.

Oualiken was also coach of the football section of the Algerian Gendarmerie from 1969 to 1977. In 1977, he became the Technical Director of now defunct club DNC Alger, helping the team climb from the amateur divisions up to the top flight and win the Algerian Cup in 1982.

== Honours ==
=== As a player ===
Nîmes

- Division 1 runner-up: 1958, 1959, 1960
- Coupe de France runner-up: 1958
- Trophée des Champions runner-up: 1958

SO Montpellier

- Division 2: 1961

USM Alger

- Algerian Championnat National: 1963

=== As a coach ===
DNC Alger

- Algerian Cup: 1982
- Promotion to Championnat National 1: 1985
