= Abdullah Al Shemali =

Kuwaiti footballer

Personal information
- Full name: Abdullah Al Shemali (Arabic:عبد الله الشمالي)
- Date of birth: January 18, 1988 (age 38)
- Place of birth: Kuwait City, Kuwait
- Height: 1.71 m (5 ft 7 in)
- Positions: Defensive midfielder; central midfielder

Team information
- Current team: Al Qadsia
- Number: 21

Youth career
- 1999: Al Arabi

Senior career*
Years	Team	Apps	(Gls)
2007–2022	Al Arabi		
2022–2025	Al Qadsia		
2025–	Al Salmiya		

International career
2006–2008	Kuwait U20		
2010-2013	Kuwait	9	(0)
- * Club domestic league appearances and goals

Abdullah Al Shemali (born 18 June 1988, in Kuwait City) is a Kuwaiti football midfielder, who plays for the Kuwaiti Premier League club Al Qadsia.

He played for Al-Arabi in the 2007 AFC Champions League group stage.
