= Billel Benhammouda =

Algerian footballer (1997–2022)

Personal information
- Date of birth: 28 August 1997
- Place of birth: Hadjout, Algeria
- Date of death: 10 June 2022 (aged 24)
- Place of death: Bou Ismaïl, Algeria
- Position: Attacking midfielder

Youth career
- 2008–2016: USMM Hadjout
- 2016–2018: USM Alger

Senior career*
Years	Team	Apps	(Gls)
2015–2016	USMM Hadjout	10	(1)
2017–2022	USM Alger	93	(11)

International career
2018–2021	Algeria U23	10	(2)
2021–2022	Algeria A'	6	(2)
- * Club domestic league appearances and goals

Billel Benhammouda (Arabic: بلال بن حمودة; 28 August 1997 – 10 June 2022) was an Algerian professional footballer who played as an attacking midfielder.

== Early life ==
Benhammouda was born in Hadjout, Tipasa Province. His father Ali is a sports teacher and football coach and his two brothers are also a football players.

== Club career ==
=== USM Alger ===
In July 2016, Benhammouda joined the reserve team of USM Alger. On 28 October 2017, he made his debut for the team in the Ligue 1 against CR Belouizdad as a substitute in 4–0 victory. On 7 July 2018 Benhammouda was promoted to USM Alger's first team, and in this season he participated in 14 matches. On 12 November 2018, he made his first game as a starter against MC Oran. At the end of the 2018–19 season he achieved his first title in his history. At the start of the 2019–20 season, he was expected to be one of the main elements, especially after the departure of several stars and match by match he has become one of the main players.

On 5 January, in the 2019–20 Algerian Cup Benhammouda scored his first goal against USM Khenchela and made two assists for Aymen Mahious and Oualid Ardji in 6–1 victory. On 14 March 2020, he scored twice, his first in Ligue 1 against MC Oran, to lead them to their first victory in two months 4–1. On 6 November 2020, Benhammouda renewed his contract until 2023. In the 2021–22 season, Benhammouda started knocking on the doors of the national team and developing his performance, and on 20 November, he scored a double against US Biskra, a few days later Benhammouda scored another double this time against RC Relizane.

== International career ==
Benhammouda participated with the Algeria national team in many categories and was the former captain of the Algeria under-23 national team. On 26 March 2019, he scored his first goals at the 2019 Africa U-23 Cup of Nations qualification against Equatorial Guinea in 3–1 victory. Algeria failed to qualify for the finals after the elimination against Ghana.

In June 2021, Benhammouda was called up by Madjid Bougherra for the first time to the Algeria A' national team against Liberia to inaugurate the new stadium in Oran in 5–1 victory. On 22 August 2021, Bougherra called up 26 players including Benhammouda to training camp in Qatar in preparation for the 2021 FIFA Arab Cup. In the second match against Burundi Benhammouda scored his first goal.

== Death ==
بسم الله الرحمن الرحيم

There was no place for eternity to exist, life begins with a cry and ends with a stroke and the interval between the beginning and the end is a life in which we write what is mentioned about us after death. And you Billel have written with your morals, your humility and your pure spirit what makes your memory immortal in hearts. Every time we want to wake up from the tragedy that befell us, but sadness sends us back to the folds of nostalgia we remember you and our hearts sweeten with what we entrusted about you.
Billel today it is not only Benhammouda family who mourns you and not only USM Alger, but all Algeria will miss you, only in body but you will remain the greatest present in hearts and permanent in minds and you will continue to have an eternal share of prayers. Dear late we do not want the lament to end with a farewell word, we will say to the meeting in the paradise of eternity.

الى الملتقى يا بلال ؛ انا لله وانا اليه راجعون

— Condolence of Secretary General of Union Sportive Médina d'Alger about the death of Billel Benhammouda.

After the end of the Algeria A' match against DR Congo A', Madjid Bougherra decided to lay off the players for one day. Benhammouda called his friend to take him home. On the road between Douaouda and Bou Ismaïl, he had a fatal traffic accident. The next day after a DNA examination his death was announced Benhammouda died at the age of 24. While USM Alger moved to Setif to play the last round match the team returned after hearing this collision news, Ligue de Football Professionnel (LFP) granted the request to postpone the match to a later date.

== Career statistics ==
=== Club ===
Appearances and goals by club, season and competition
Club	Season	League			Algerian Cup		Continental		Other		Total	
Club	Season	Division	Apps	Goals	Apps	Goals	Apps	Goals	Apps	Goals	Apps	Goals
USMM Hadjout	2015–16	Ligue 2	11	1	—		—		—		11	1
USM Alger	2017–18	Ligue 1	5	0	—		—		—		5	0
USM Alger	2018–19	Ligue 1	12	0	2	0	—		—		14	0
USM Alger	2019–20	Ligue 1	14	2	2	1	8 (Note: All appearance(s) in Champions League)	0	—		24	3
USM Alger	2020–21	Ligue 1	32	2	—		—		4 (Note: One appearance in Algerian Super Cup, three appearances in Algerian League Cup)	0	36	2
USM Alger	2021–22	Ligue 1	30	7	—		—		—		30	7
USM Alger	Total		93	11	4	1	8	0	4	0	109	12
Career total			104	12	4	1	8	0	4	0	120	13

=== International ===
Scores and results list Algeria A' goal tally first, score column indicates score after each Benhammouda goal.

List of international goals scored by Billel Benhammouda
No.	Date	Venue	Opponent	Score	Result	Competition
1	29 August 2021	Al-Khor SC Stadium, Al Khor, Qatar	Burundi	2–0	3–0	Friendly
2	9 June 2022	Stade du 5 Juillet, Algiers, Algeria	DR Congo	2–0	3–0	Friendly

== Honours ==
USM Alger

- Algerian Ligue Professionnelle 1: 2018–19
