= 1981–82 Algerian Cup =

كأس الجزائر

Tournament details
- Country: Algeria

Final positions
- Champions: DNC Alger (1)
- Runners-up: NA Hussein Dey

The 1981–82 Algerian Cup was the 20th edition of the Algerian Cup. DNC Alger defeated MA Hussein Dey in the final, 2-1.

USK Alger, the defending champions, lost to MP Alger in the quarterfinals.

== Quarter-finals ==
26 March 1982	MP Alger	4 – 4 (a.e.t.) (3 - 0 p)	USK Alger	Stade 5 Juillet 1962, Algiers
	Bousri 29', 77'; Bellemou 30'; Mahiouz 104'		9', 82' Boutemine; 79' Guedioura; 91' Ali Messaoud

26 March 1982	DNC Alger	0 – 0 (a.e.t.) (3 - 1 p)	USM El Harrach	Stade 20 Août 1955, Algiers

26 March 1982	GCR Mascara	1 – 2	NA Hussein Dey	Stade du 19 Juin 1965, Oran

26 March 1982	CM Constantine	1 – 2	RS Kouba	Stade 8 Mai 1945, Sétif

== Semi-finals ==
21 May 1982	DNC Alger	3 – 1	MP Alger	Stade 5 Juillet 1962, Algiers
	Demdoum 30'; Aliouane 37'; Khelloufi 90'		79' Laaouada

21 May 1982	NA Hussein Dey	1 – 1 (a.e.t.) (? - ? p)	RS Kouba

== Final ==
=== Match ===
18 June 1982

DNC Alger	2–1	NA Hussein Dey
Demdoum 20'; Bouznada 81'		Khedis 90'

Stade 5 Juillet 1962, Algiers
Attendance: 3,000
