= Ouled El Bahdja =

Ouled EL Bahdja
- Established: 31 December 2011 (14 years ago)
- Type: Supporters' group
- Motto: Usmiste Conservateur
- Stadiums: Omar Hamadi Stadium; Stade du 5 Juillet
- Colours

Ouled EL Bahdja was a supporters' group of USM Alger football fans established in the 1990s by a group of fans from Casbah. Members were known for chanting songs in support of their club, USM Alger. Ouled El Bahdja is widely recognized for popularizing protest songs in Algeria. Originally created to perform chants in the stands of Omar Hamadi Stadium, the group's repertoire gradually evolved to address social and political issues, including youth unemployment, corruption, and the country's political situation.

In 2019, several of the collective's songs gained nationwide prominence during the Hirak, the mass protest movement that began on 22 February 2019 in opposition to President Abdelaziz Bouteflika's bid for a fifth presidential term. Among the group's most notable songs were La Ultima Verba and La Casa del Mouradia, both of which became closely associated with the demonstrations and were widely sung by protesters across the country.

La Ultima Verba, released in collaboration with Algerian rapper Soolking, achieved significant popularity on digital platforms shortly after its release. Meanwhile, La Casa del Mouradia, inspired by the Spanish television series La Casa de Papel, employed satirical lyrics to criticize Algeria's political leadership and Bouteflika's attempt to seek another presidential term. Its chorus became one of the most recognizable chants of the Hirak movement.

The songs of Ouled El Bahdja are widely regarded as symbolic of the 2019 protest movement. Their popularity extended beyond football stadiums, highlighting the role of supporters' groups in expressing social and political grievances in Algeria. Members wished to remain anonymous, and refused public appearance and media interviews. The group was officially disbanded in 2022, citing problems and harassment facing its members.

== History ==
... Our intervention [at a commemoration of footballer Rino Della Negra] was mainly focused on the history and history of protest of our club, USM Alger, both on the role played by the club in the war of liberation and on the role played by the fans in the social movements that the country has experienced.

— Ouled EL Bahdja to its members on the 10th anniversary of its founding

Ouled EL Bahdja was founded in the 1990s, the only such supporters' group in Algeria at the time. The group regularly organized tifo among fans at games, both in the Ligue Professionnelle 1 and continental competitions. Support for the group extended into Tunisia and Morocco.

On December 14, 2022, Ouled EL Bahdja announced that it was stopping its activity after 15 years. In a press release, its members stated that the group was unable to continue serving the best interests of USM Alger, and that its disbandment was partially due to the group's legal problems and harassment.

=== Notable activities ===
On 21 June 2017, in a match against Zamalek in the CAF Champions League, USM Alger supporters hoisted their biggest banner (spanning between runway 13 and runway 21 of the Stade du 5 Juillet) bearing the phrase "Islamic Union" in Arabic, a reference to the old name of the club, Union Sportive Musulmane d'Alger.

In the match against CAPS United F.C. on the 80th anniversary of the founding of USM Alger, supporters lifted a banner with the number 80 and a logo written in French ("Ensemble"); 80 minutes into the game, fans celebrated with fireworks such as smoke grenades. The tifo of USM Alger fans in the quarterfinals of the 2017 CAF Champions League against Ferroviário Beira (Mozambique) was ranked second in the "Top 10 tifos of the week" by the specialized site La Grinta. The tifo had a banner written in English with "I will try until I die", implying the team's intent to win its first African cup.

== Rivalries and friendships ==
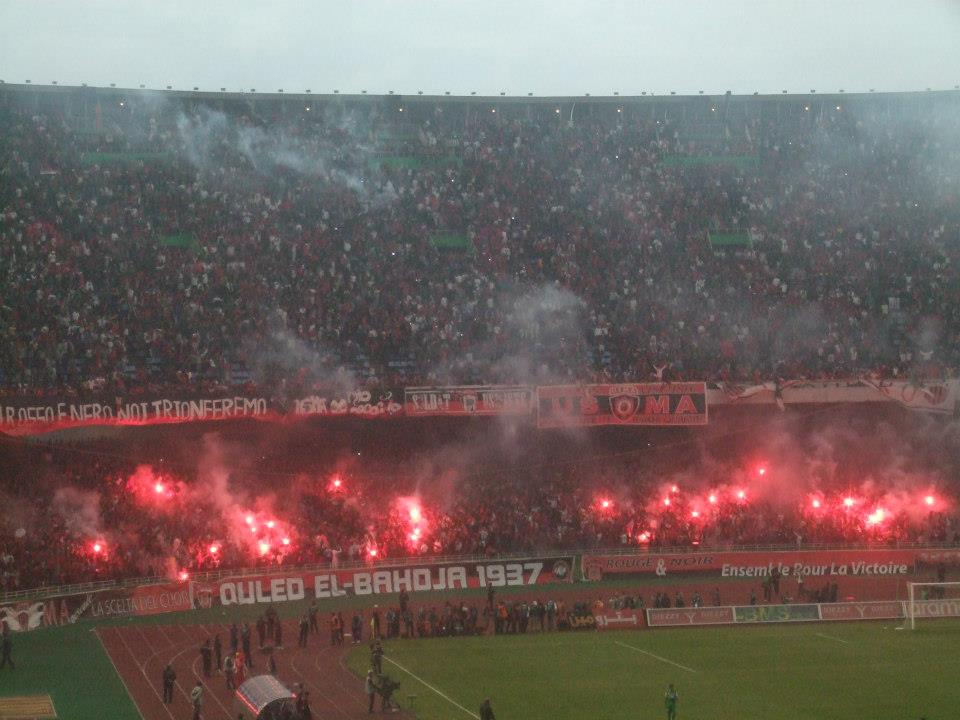
Ouled EL Bahdja fans during the 2013 UAFA Club Cup Final against Al-Arabi SC in Algiers.

The principal and oldest rivalry of Ouled EL Bahdja was against supporters of MC Alger, the other football club in Algiers. Other rivalries included against supporters of CR Belouizdad, JS Kabylie, and USM El Harrach. The group had few local friendships; its only twinning was with the ultras of CS Constantine and WA Tlemcen.

At the international level, there is good friendship with supporters of Wydad AC of Morocco and Espérance de Tunis of Tunisia. Despite the diplomatic relations between Algeria and Morocco, supporters of the two teams are friendly—during the 2017 CAF Champions League, Wydad supporters received free stadium tickets to the game in Algeria, and vice versa for the second match.

During the 2019–20 CAF Champions League, Wydad's captain Brahim Nekkach presented a special gift to Algerian footballer Mohamed Lamine Zemmamouche: a 77-year-old letter from Union Sportive Musulmane Algéroise that invited Wydad Casablanca to participate in a friendly tournament in Algeria in 1943.

== Music production ==
Ouled EL Bahdja is considered the best in Algeria in the field of sports songs. Some of its popular songs have been modified by fans of other clubs in Algeria. From 2018, the band led in political songs about the ruling regime and the owner of the club, Ali Haddad, known for his close relations with Saïd Bouteflika (brother of then-president Abdelaziz Bouteflika). In the song "ULTIMA VERBA", the verse "Down of the state and those who built the highway" criticizes Haddad and his construction company, ETRHB Haddad.

At the start of the 2019–2021 Algerian protests, protesters used the club's song; most notably, "La Casa Del Mouradia" and "Babor Ellouh". On 14 March 2019, Algerian singer Soolking released a song with Ouled EL Bahdja about the protests called "Liberté". The song's video approached 18 million views within its first week on YouTube, and surpassed 100 million views on 10 June 2019.

Year	Song	Main artist	Song title translation (English)
2003	"Men Sabni Fi Bologhine"	Groupe Milano	"Who found me in Bologhine"
2007	"Katrou Hmoumi"	Groupe Milano	"My ambition grew"
2015	"Les vrais Supporteurs"	Ouled EL Bahdja	"Real supporters"
2015	"jamais Nkhounou"	Ouled EL Bahdja	"We will never betray"
2016	"WSSAYA FI STOR"	Ouled EL Bahdja	"Commandments in brief"
2016	"HWAK NTI"	Ouled EL Bahdja	"Your Love"
2018	"Babor Elou7"	Ouled EL Bahdja	"Wood ship"
2018	"La Casa Del Mouradia"	Ouled EL Bahdja	"Palace of El Mouradia"
2018	"Y'en a marre"	Mouh Milano	"I'm sick of it"
2018	"Qilouna"	Ouled EL Bahdja	"Leave us"
2018	"Wlid el virage"	Ouled EL Bahdja	"Son of the curved"
2019	"ULTIMA VERBA"	Ouled EL Bahdja	"Our last shot"
2019	"Liberté"	Soolking feat. Ouled EL Bahdja	"Freedom"
2019	"Nar El Hamra" (نار الحمرة)	Ouled EL Bahdja	"the red fire"
2019	"Azma w Victoire" (أزمة و فيكتوار)	Ouled EL Bahdja	"Crisis and victory"
2019	"El Bahdja Qanoun"	Mouh Milano	"El Bahdja law"
2019	"Qoloulou" (قولولو)	Mouh Milano	"Say to him"
2019	"5 Juillet"	Ouled EL Bahdja	"5 July"
2020	"FI HALI NSSIR"	Ouled EL Bahdja	"I walk with myself"
2021	"Wqat 3ssiba" (وقات عصيبة)	Ouled EL Bahdja	"Tough times"
2023	"حلو البيبان"	UNITED 37	"Open the doors"
2024	"حب النادي أولى"	L’USMA Riyas Dzair	"Love the club first"
2024	"ماركة مسجلة"	L’USMA Riyas Dzair	"Registered Mark"
2025	"الأوتار الصامتة"	L’USMA Riyas Dzair	"Silent Chords"
2025	"محبتي ليك Sacré"	L'USMA Riyas Dzair	"My love for you is sacred"
2025	"Old Echo - Palmarès"	Old Echo	"Old Echo - Charts"
2026	"ياما جرالي"	L'USMA Riyas Dzair	"A lot has happened to me"
2026	"Médina d’Alger"	EL ASSIMA	"City of Algiers"
