= 2019–20 MC Alger season =

MC Alger
2019–20 season
- Owner: Sonatrach
- President: Omar Ghrib (until 10 July 2019); Foued Sakhri (from 10 July 2019) (until 15 January 2020); Abdenacer Almas (from 15 January 2020)
- Head coach: Bernard Casoni (from 4 May 2019) (until 7 december 2019); Mohamed Mekhazni (c) (from 7 december 2019) (until 10 February 2020); Nabil Neghiz (from 11 February 2020)
- Stadium: Stade du 5 Juillet
- Ligue 1: Runners-up
- Algerian Cup: Round of 32
- Club Championship: Quarter-finals
- Top goalscorer: League: Samy Frioui (9 goals); All: Samy Frioui (12 goals)
Home colours	Away colours	Third colours

In the 2019–20 season, MC Alger competed in the Ligue 1 for the 51st season, as well as the Algerian Cup. On March 15, 2020, the Ligue de Football Professionnel (LFP) decided to halt the season due to the COVID-19 pandemic in Algeria. On July 29, 2020, the LFP declared that season is over and CR Belouizdad to be the champion, the promotion of four teams from the League 2, and scraping the relegation for the current season.

== Squad list ==
Players and squad numbers last updated on 6 August 2009.
Note: Flags indicate national team as has been defined under FIFA eligibility rules. Players may hold more than one non-FIFA nationality.

No.	Name	Nat.	Position	Date of birth (age)	Signed from
Goalkeepers
Defenders
Midfielders
Forwards

== Pre-season ==
23 July 2019 Friendly	MC Alger (Algeria)	6–0	(Poland) Miedź Legnica	Lubin, Poland
18:00 UTC+1	Nekkache 11'; Djabou 22'; Hachoud 34'; Benaldjia 55'; Frioui 60'; Bourdim 87'	Report		Stadium: Stadion Zagłębia Lubin

29 July 2019 Friendly	MC Alger (Algeria)	2–1	(Poland) Górnik Polkowice	Lubin, Poland
18:00 UTC+1	Derrardja 17', 44'	[ Report]	16' Michał Bednarski	Stadium: Kopalniana Street Stadium

6 August 2019 Friendly	MC Alger	1–1	USM El Harrach	Algiers
18:00 UTC+1	Djabou 15'	[ Report]	9' Bahi	Stadium: July 5, 1962 Stadium

== Competitions ==
=== Overview ===
Competition	Record								Started round	Final position / round	First match	Last match
Competition	G	W	D	L	GF	GA	GD	Win %	Started round	Final position / round	First match	Last match
Ligue 1	21	11	4	6	31	25	+6	52.38	—N/a	Runners-up	16 August 2019	14 March 2020
Algerian Cup	2	1	1	0	2	1	+1	50.00	Round of 64	Round of 32	28 December 2019	26 January 2020
Club Champions Cup	6	2	3	1	4	3	+1	33.33	First round	Quarter-finals	24 September 2019	9 February 2020
Total	29	14	8	7	37	29	+8	48.28				

Updated to match played 15 February 2020
Source: Competitions

== League table ==
Pos	Team	Pld	W	D	L	GF	GA	GD	Pts	PPG	Qualification or relegation
1	CR Belouizdad (C)	21	11	7	3	30	16	+14	40	1.90	Qualification for Champions League
2	MC Alger	21	11	4	6	31	25	+6	37	1.76	Qualification for Champions League
3	ES Sétif	22	11	4	7	34	19	+15	37	1.68	Qualification for Confederation Cup
4	JS Kabylie	22	10	6	6	27	18	+9	36	1.64	Qualification for Confederation Cup
5	CS Constantine	22	9	7	6	32	23	+9	34	1.55	

Updated to match(es) played on 15 March 2020. Source: dzfoot.com
Rules for classification: 1) points; 2) head-to-head points; 3) head-to-head goal difference; 4) goal difference; 5) total goals; 6) fairplay ranking; 7) playoff.
(C) Champions

=== Results summary ===
Overall								Home						Away					
Pld	W	D	L	GF	GA	GD	Pts	W	D	L	GF	GA	GD	W	D	L	GF	GA	GD
21	11	4	6	28	25	+3	37	5	3	2	13	11	+2	6	1	4	15	14	+1

Last updated: 15 February 2020.
Source: Competitive matches

=== Results by round ===
Round	1	2	3	4	5	6	7	8	9	10	11	12	13	14	15	16	17	18	19	20	21	22	23	24	25	26	27	28	29	30
Ground	H	A	A	H	A	H	A	H	A	H	A	H	A	H	A	A	H	H	A	H	A	H	A	H	A	H	A	H	A	H
Result	D	W	W	W	W	W	D	W	W	L	L	D	L	L	W	L	C	W	W	D	L	W	C	C	C	C	C	C	C	C
Position	5	1	1	1	2	2	2	1	1	1	2	2	2	2	2	2	3	2	2	2	4	3	2	2	2	2	2	2	2	2

Updated to match(es) played on 15 February 2020. Source: Competitive matches
A = Away; H = Home; W = Win; D = Draw; L = Loss

=== Matches ===
Win Draw Loss

16 August 2019 Round 1	MC Alger	1–1	AS Ain M'lila	Algiers
21:00	Derrardja 82'	Soccerway report	Siam 84'	Stadium: Stade du 5 Juillet; Referee: Mohamed Saïdi

19 August 2019 Round 2	Paradou AC	1–2	MC Alger	Bologhine
20:30	Guenaoui 19'	Soccerway report	Frioui 52'; Chafaï 65'	Stadium: Omar Hamadi Stadium; Referee: Mehdi Abid Charef

31 August 2019 Round 3	JS Saoura	0–1	MC Alger	Béchar
20:30		Soccerway report	Belkheir 61'	Stadium: Stade 20 Août 1955; Referee: Yazid Ibrir

15 September 2019 Round 5	MC Oran	2–3	MC Alger	Oran
21:00	Mesmoudi 55'; Mansouri 90+5' (pen.)	Soccerway report	Bendebka 33'; Brahimi 40'; Bourdim 90+1'	Stadium: Ahmed Zabana Stadium; Referee: Farouk Mial

5 October 2019 Round 7	NC Magra	0–0	MC Alger	Sétif
16:00		Soccerway report		Stadium: Stade 8 Mai 1945; Referee: Bilal Bendjahene

12 October 2019 Round 4	MC Alger	3–0	USM Alger	Algiers
17:45		Soccerway report		Stadium: Stade du 5 Juillet; Referee: Abderrezzak Arab
Note: Penalty lost to USM Alger and award the win to MC Alger who scores three (03) points and a score of 3/0 and were deducted three points to USM Alger.

23 October 2019 Round 8	MC Alger	3–0	NA Hussein Dey	Algiers
17:00	Derrardja 48' (pen.); Bendebka 54'; Benaldjia 85'	Soccerway report		Stadium: Stade du 5 Juillet; Referee: Youcef Gamouh

30 October 2019 Round 9	US Biskra	0–3	MC Alger	Biskra
18:00		Soccerway report		Stadium: Stade du 18 Février; Referee: Ahmed Bouzrar
Note: Penalty lost to US Biskra and award the win to MC Alger who scores three (03) points and a score of 3/0.

13 November 2019 Round 10	MC Alger	0–3	JS Kabylie	Algiers
18:45		Soccerway report	Belgherbi 50'; Hamroune 68' (pen.); Bensayah 90+1'	Stadium: Stade du 5 Juillet; Referee: Abdelali Ibrir

17 November 2019 Round 6	MC Alger	1–0	CA Bordj Bou Arreridj	Bologhine
18:45	Derrardja 14'	Soccerway report		Stadium: Omar Hamadi Stadium; Referee: Mohamed Saïdi

23 November 2019 Round 11	ASO Chlef	2–1	MC Alger	Chlef
16:00	Benamrane 20'; Benhamla 82' (pen.)	Soccerway report	Frioui 61'	Stadium: Stade Mohamed Boumezrag; Referee: Malek Ait Ameur

30 November 2019 Round 12	MC Alger	2–2	CR Belouizdad	Bologhine
15:00	Khali 78' (o.g.); Nekkache 90+2'	Soccerway report	Chaâl 35' (o.g.); Sayoud 80'	Stadium: Omar Hamadi Stadium; Referee: Lahlou Benbraham

7 December 2019 Round 13	USM Bel Abbès	3–1	MC Alger	Sidi Bel Abbès
15:00	Belhocini 42', 80' (pen.); Haddad 89'	Soccerway report	Alati 38'	Stadium: Stade 24 Fevrier 1956; Referee: Youcef Gamouh

21 December 2019 Round 15	CS Constantine	2–3	MC Alger	Constantine
17:45	Abid 5'; Balegh 73'	Soccerway report	Nekkache 33'; Frioui 57' (pen.), 77' (pen.)	Stadium: Stade Mohamed Hamlaoui; Referee: Nabil Boukhalfa

9 January 2020 Round 14	MC Alger	1–2	ES Sétif	Bologhine
17:00	Frioui 31'	Soccerway report	Kendouci 40'; Boussouf 50'	Stadium: Omar Hamadi Stadium; Referee: Ahmed Bouzrar

1 February 2020 Round 16	AS Ain M'lila	1–0	MC Alger	Aïn M'lila
15:00	Si Ammar 90'	Soccerway report		Stadium: Touhami Zoubir Khelifi Stadium; Attendance: 0 (close doors); Referee: Mustapha Ghorbal

15 February 2020 Round 18	MC Alger	1–0	JS Saoura	Bologhine
16:00	Bourdim 42'	Soccerway report		Stadium: Omar Hamadi Stadium; Attendance: 0 (close doors); Referee: Lahlou Benbraham

24 February 2020 Round 19	USM Alger	0–1	MC Alger	Algiers
17:45		Soccerway report	Frioui 61'	Stadium: Stade du 5 Juillet; Referee: Youcef Gamouh

29 February 2020 Round 20	MC Alger	1–1	MC Oran	Algiers
17:45	Frioui 15'	Soccerway report	Motrani 73'	Stadium: Stade du 5 Juillet; Referee: Abdelali Ibrir

5 March 2020 Round 21	CA Bordj Bou Arreridj	3–0	MC Alger	Bordj Bou Arréridj
16:00	Djahnit 1'; Elghomari 56' (pen.); Yousif 59'	Soccerway report		Stadium: August 20, 1955 Stadium; Referee: Malek Ait Ameur

14 March 2020 Round 22	MC Alger	3–2	NC Magra	Algiers
17:45	Frioui 21', 37' (pen.); Bourdim 54'	Soccerway report	Haroun 50'; Aib 67'	Stadium: Stade du 5 Juillet; Attendance: 0 (close doors); Referee: Abdelmoumen Touabti
Note: due to coronavirus outbreak, Ministry of Health, Population and Hospital Reform decided to be all matches played behind closed doors.

26 March 2020 Round 17	MC Alger	Cancelled	Paradou AC	Algiers
				Stadium: Stade du 5 Juillet

Round 23	NA Hussein Dey	Cancelled	MC Alger	Belouizdad
				Stadium: Stade 20 Août 1955

Round 24	MC Alger	Cancelled	US Biskra	Algiers
				Stadium: Stade du 5 Juillet

Round 25	JS Kabylie	Cancelled	MC Alger	Tizi Ouzou
				Stadium: Stade 1er Novembre 1954

Round 26	MC Alger	Cancelled	ASO Chlef	Algiers
				Stadium: Stade du 5 Juillet

Round 27	CR Belouizdad	Cancelled	MC Alger	Belouizdad
				Stadium: Stade 20 Août 1955

Round 28	MC Alger	Cancelled	USM Bel Abbès	Algiers
				Stadium: Stade du 5 Juillet

Round 29	ES Sétif	Cancelled	MC Alger	Sétif
				Stadium: Stade 8 Mai 1945

Round 30	MC Alger	Cancelled	CS Constantine	Algiers
				Stadium: Stade du 5 Juillet

== Algerian Cup ==
28 December 2019 Round of 64	MC Alger	2–1 (a.e.t.)	O. Magrane	Bologhine
16:00	Frioui 41'; Bourdim 95'	Report	Bendagich 38'	Stadium: Omar Hamadi Stadium; Referee: Meziani, Louz, Khelladi
Note: Lineup for MC Alger - Toual, Alati, Lamara, Rebiai, Merouani, Bendebka, Harrag, Benaldjia (Bourdim 62’), Djabou (Nekkache 80’), Frioui (El Moudene 112’), Rehmani (Hachoud 101’)

26 January 2020 Round of 32	WA Boufarik	0–0 (a.e.t.) (5–4 p)	MC Alger	Boufarik
14:00				Stadium: Stade Mohamed Reggaz; Referee: Redouane Necib
Note: Lineup for MC Alger - Toual, Hachoud, Brahimi, Merouani (Saïla 94’), Mebarakou, Ouertani, Belkheïr (Dahlal 117’), Bendebka, Frioui, Djabou (Rahmani 71’), Bourdim, (Derrardja 80’)

== Club Championship Cup ==
=== First round ===
24 September 2019 First leg	MC Alger (Algeria)	1–0	(Oman) Dhofar Club	Algiers
20:30 UTC+1	Azzi 59'	Report		Stadium: Stade du 5 Juillet 1962; Referee: Noureddine El Jaafari (Morocco)
Note: Lineup for MC Alger - Chaâl - Brahimi, Mebarakou, Azzi, Hachoud - Rebiai (Bendebka 56'), Harrag (Belkheir 80'), El Mouden - Djabou (Benaldjia 77'), Nekkache, Derrardja

30 September 2019 Second leg	Dhofar Club (Oman)	1–1	(Algeria) MC Alger	Salalah
20:30 UTC+4	Al-Muqbali 61'	Report	Nekkache 75'	Stadium: Salalah Sports Complex; Referee: Sultan Al-Marzooqi (United Arab Emirates)
Note: Lineup for MC Alger - Chaâl - Brahimi, Hachoud, Azzi, Chafai - Bendebka, Harrag, El Mouden - Nekkache (Frioui 80'), Derrardja (Benaldjia 90+5'), Belkheir (Alati 76')

=== Second round ===
8 November 2019 First leg	Al-Quwa Al-Jawiya (Iraq)	0–0	(Algeria) MC Alger	Erbil
16:00 UTC+3		Report		Stadium: Franso Hariri Stadium; Referee: Masoud Tufaylieh (Syria)
Note: Lineup for MC Alger - Chaal - Hachoud, Mebarakou (Azzi 19'), Chafai, Brahimi - Harrag, Bendebka, El Mouden - Djabou, Rooney (Derrardja 90'), Belkheir

16 December 2019 (Note: The second leg fixture between MC Alger and Al-Quwa Al-Jawiya, originally scheduled to be played on 24 November 2019, was postponed following issues concerning the travels of Al-Quwa Al-Jawiya due to security concerns from the 2019 Iraqi protests. The UAFA later announced that the match would take place on 16 December 2019.) Second leg	MC Alger (Algeria)	0–0 (4–2 p)	(Iraq) Al-Quwa Al-Jawiya	Blida
20:00 UTC+1		Report		Stadium: Mustapha Tchaker Stadium; Referee: Mohammed Al-Hoish (Saudi Arabia)
	Penalties
	Lamara (penalty scored); Frioui (penalty scored); Ouertani (penalty scored); Bendebka (penalty scored)		(penalty missed) Abboud; (penalty scored) Bayesh; (penalty scored) Nsayef; (penalty missed) Nabeel
Note: Lineup for MC Alger - Chaâl - Lamara, Chafai, Azzi, Allati - Bendebka, Rebiai, Ouertani - Benaldjia M., Nekkache (Djabou 66'), Frioui

=== Quarter-finals ===
4 January 2020 First leg	MC Alger (Algeria)	1–2	(Morocco) Raja Casablanca	Blida
20:00 UTC+1	Frioui 29'	Report	Moutouali 59' (pen.); Malango 83'	Stadium: Mustapha Tchaker Stadium; Referee: Adel Al Naqbi (United Arab Emirates)

9 February 2020 Second leg	Raja Casablanca (Morocco)	0–1	(Algeria) MC Alger	Casablanca
20:00 UTC+1		Report	Frioui 42' (pen.)	Stadium: Stade Mohammed V Referee: Mohammed Al-Hoish (Saudi Arabia)

== Squad information ==
=== Playing statistics ===
No.	Pos	Nat	Player	Total		Ligue 1		Algerian Cup		Club Championship	
No.	Pos	Nat	Player	Apps	Goals	Apps	Goals	Apps	Goals	Apps	Goals
1	GK	(Algeria) ALG	Farid Chaâl	20	0	14	0	0	0	6	0
30	GK	(Algeria) ALG	Athmane Toual	8	0	5	0	2	0	1	0
16	GK	(Algeria) ALG	Ahmed Boutagga	1	0	1	0	0	0	0	0
3	DF	(Algeria) ALG	Nabil Lamara	10	0	7	0	1	0	2	0
5	DF	(Algeria) ALG	Zidane Mebarakou	20	0	16	0	1	0	3	0
12	DF	(Algeria) ALG	Miloud Rebiai	16	0	11	0	1	0	4	0
13	DF	(Algeria) ALG	Belkacem Brahimi	18	1	13	1	1	0	4	0
20	DF	(Algeria) ALG	Walid Alati	10	1	6	1	1	0	3	0
27	DF	(Algeria) ALG	Abderahmane Hachoud	22	1	15	1	2	0	5	0
28	DF	(Algeria) ALG	Mohamed Merouani	12	0	8	0	2	0	2	0
	DF	(Algeria) ALG	Abdelhak Saïla	4	0	2	0	1	0	1	0
2	MF	(Algeria) ALG	Oualid Mamoun	0	0	0	0	0	0	0	0
7	MF	(Algeria) ALG	Chamseddine Harrag	18	0	13	0	1	0	4	0
8	MF	(Algeria) ALG	Abderrahmane Bourdim	12	4	8	3	2	1	2	0
13	MF	(Algeria) ALG	Hichem Chérif El-Ouazzani	0	0	0	0	0	0	0	0
14	MF	(Algeria) ALG	Mehdi Benaldjia	23	1	17	1	1	0	5	0
10	MF	(Algeria) ALG	Abdelmoumene Djabou	18	0	12	0	2	0	4	0
18	MF	(Tunisia) TUN	Mehdi Ouertani	11	0	8	0	1	0	2	0
24	MF	(Algeria) ALG	Abdellah El Moudene	20	0	15	0	1	0	4	0
29	MF	(Algeria) ALG	Aymen Rahmani	3	0	1	0	2	0	0	0
5	FW	(Algeria) ALG	Samy Frioui	21	12	15	9	2	1	4	2
9	FW	(Algeria) ALG	Hichem Nekkache	21	3	15	2	1	0	5	1
17	FW	(Algeria) ALG	Walid Derrardja	21	3	17	3	1	0	3	0
21	FW	(Algeria) ALG	Abdenour Belkheir	13	0	9	0	1	0	3	0
26	FW	(Algeria) ALG	Abdelkrim Benarous	1	0	1	0	0	0	0	0
Players transferred out during the season
6	DF	(Algeria) ALG	Farouk Chafaï	12	1	9	1	0	0	3	0
22	DF	(Algeria) ALG	Ayoub Azzi	13	1	8	0	0	0	5	1
25	MF	(Algeria) ALG	Sofiane Bendebka	19	2	12	2	2	0	5	0
11	FW	(Cameroon) CMR	Rooney Eva Wankewai	6	0	5	0	0	0	1	0

Last updated: 28 May 2018
Source: fr.soccerway.com

=== Goalscorers ===
Includes all competitive matches. The list is sorted alphabetically by surname when total goals are equal.

No.	Nat.	Player	Pos.	L 1	AC	ACC	TOTAL
5	(Algeria)	Samy Frioui	FW	9	1	2	12
8	(Algeria)	Abderrahmane Bourdim	MF	3	1	0	4
9	(Algeria)	Hichem Nekkache	FW	2	0	1	3
17	(Algeria)	Walid Derrardja	FW	3	0	0	3
25	(Algeria)	Sofiane Bendebka	MF	2	0	0	2
13	(Algeria)	Belkacem Brahimi	DF	1	0	0	1
20	(Algeria)	Walid Alati	DF	1	0	0	1
27	(Algeria)	Abderahmane Hachoud	DF	1	0	0	1
14	(Algeria)	Mehdi Benaldjia	MF	0	0	0	0
6	(Algeria)	Farouk Chafaï	DF	1	0	0	1
22	(Algeria)	Ayoub Azzi	DF	0	0	1	1
Own Goals				1	0	0	1
Totals				31	2	4	37

== Squad list ==
As of 15 August 2019 Note: Flags indicate national team as defined under FIFA eligibility rules; some limited exceptions apply. Players may hold more than one non-FIFA nationality.

No.	Pos.	Nation	Player
1	GK	ALG	Farid Chaâl
3	DF	ALG	Rabah Mokrani
5	DF	ALG	Zidane Mebarakou
6	DF	ALG	Farouk Chafaï
7	MF	ALG	Chamseddine Harrag
8	MF	ALG	Abderrahmane Bourdim
9	FW	ALG	Hichem Nekkache
10	MF	ALG	Abdelmoumene Djabou
11	FW	CMR	Rooney Eva Wankewai
12	DF	ALG	Miloud Rebiai
13	DF	ALG	Belkacem Brahimi
14	FW	ALG	Mehdi Benaldjia
15	DF	ALG	Nabil Lamara

No.	Pos.	Nation	Player
16	GK	ALG	Ahmed Boutagga
17	FW	ALG	Walid Derrardja
18	MF	TUN	Mehdi Ouertani
20	DF	ALG	Walid Alati
21	FW	ALG	Abdenour Belkheir
22	DF	ALG	Ayoub Azzi
23	FW	ALG	Samy Frioui
24	MF	ALG	Abdellah El Moudene
25	MF	ALG	Sofiane Bendebka (captain)
26	FW	ALG	Abdelkrim Benarous
27	DF	ALG	Abderahmane Hachoud
28	DF	ALG	Mohamed Merouani
30	GK	ALG	Athmane Toual

== Transfers ==
=== In ===
Date	Pos	Player	from club	Transfer fee	Source
2 June 2019	RB	(Algeria) Walid Alati	NA Hussein Dey	Free transfer	
9 June 2019	LB	(Algeria) Belkacem Brahimi	NA Hussein Dey	Free transfer	
15 June 2019	AM / RW / RM	(Algeria) Abdelmoumene Djabou	ES Sétif	Free transfer	
27 June 2019	GK	(Algeria) Ahmed Boutagga	USM Blida	Free transfer	
2 July 2019	RW	(Algeria) Abdenour Belkheir	CS Constantine	Free transfer	
4 July 2019	ST	(Cameroon) Rooney Eva Wankewai	(Greece) Aittitos Spata	Free transfer	
15 July 2019	CB	(Algeria) Farouk Chafaï	USM Alger	Free transfer	
19 July 2019	DM	(Algeria) Chamseddine Harrag	NA Hussein Dey	Free transfer	
19 July 2019	DM	(Tunisia) Mehdi Ouertani	NA Hussein Dey	Free transfer	
22 July 2019	RB	(Algeria) Miloud Rebiai	ES Sétif	40,000,000 DA	
22 July 2019	CB	(Algeria) Zidane Mebarakou	(Saudi Arabia) Al-Wehda	Free transfer	
31 July 2019	GK	(Algeria) Athmane Toual	USM Bel Abbès	Free transfer	
22 January 2020	DF	(Algeria) Abdelhak Saila	MC El Eulma	Free transfer	

=== Out ===
Date	Pos	Player	To club	Transfer fee	Source
20 June 2019	RW	(Algeria) Oussama Tebbi	ES Sétif	Free transfer	
20 June 2019	ST	(Algeria) Mohamed Souibaâh	ES Sétif	Free transfer	
30 June 2019	CB	(Algeria) Abdelghani Demmou	Unattached	Free transfer	
2 July 2019	LW	(Algeria) Zakaria Haddouche	USM Alger	Free transfer	
5 July 2019	DM	(Mali) Aliou Dieng	(Egypt) Al Ahly	1,100,000 US$	
30 July 2019	CM / DM / AM	(Madagascar) Ibrahim Amada	(Qatar) Al-Khor	Free transfer	
6 November 2019	RB	(Algeria) Farès Hachi	(France) AS Lyon-Duchère	Free transfer	
5 January 2020	CB	(Algeria) Farouk Chafaï	(Saudi Arabia) Damac FC	Loan for six months	
10 January 2020	DF	(Algeria) Ayoub Azzi	(Qatar) Umm Salal	Free transfer (Released)	
20 January 2020	ST	(Cameroon) Rooney Eva Wankewai	AS Ain M'lila	Loan for six months	
29 January 2020	MF	(Algeria) Sofiane Bendebka	(Saudi Arabia) Al-Fateh SC	Free transfer (Released)	
