= 2018–19 MC Alger season =

MC Alger
2018–19 season
- Owner: Sonatrach
- Chairman: Kamel Kaci-Saïd (until 26 March 2019); Omar Ghrib (from 10 April 2019)
- Head coach: Bernard Casoni (until 30 August 2018); Adel Amrouche (from 24 October 2018) (until 11 March 2019); Mohamed Mekhazni (from 13 March 2019)
- Stadium: Stade Omar Hamadi; Stade du 5 Juillet
- Ligue 1: 6th
- Algerian Cup: Round of 16
- Champions League: Group stage
- Club Championship: Quarter-finals
- Top goalscorer: League: Mohamed Souibaâh; Hichem Nekkache (6 goals each one); All: Mohamed Souibaâh (8 goals)
Home colours	Away colours

In the 2018–19 season, MC Alger competed in the Ligue 1 for the 48th season, as well as the Algerian Cup.

== Squad list ==
Players and squad numbers last updated on 13 August 2018.
Note: Flags indicate national team as has been defined under FIFA eligibility rules. Players may hold more than one non-FIFA nationality.

No.	Nat.	Name	Position	Date of birth (age)	Signed from
Goalkeepers
1	(Algeria)	Farid Chaâl	GK	3 July 1994 (aged 24)	(Algeria) Reserve team
16	(Algeria)	Abdelkader Morcely	GK	17 September 1995 (aged 22)	(Algeria) Olympique de Médéa
30	(Algeria)	Said Daas	GK	14 May 1999 (aged 19)	(Algeria) Reserve team
Defenders
12	(Algeria)	Farès Hachi	LB	5 November 1989 (aged 28)	(South Africa) Mamelodi Sundowns
15	(Algeria)	Zidane Mebarakou	CB	3 January 1989 (aged 29)	(Algeria) MO Béjaïa
20	(Algeria)	Islam Arous	RB	6 August 1996 (aged 22)	(Algeria) Paradou AC (Loan)
21	(Algeria)	Oualid Mamoun		3 April 1996 (aged 22)	(France) Angers B
22	(Algeria)	Ayoub Azzi	CB / RB	14 September 1989 (aged 28)	(Algeria) USM El Harrach
24	(Algeria)	Abdelghani Demmou	CB	29 January 1989 (aged 29)	(Algeria) ES Sétif
27	(Algeria)	Abderahmane Hachoud (C.)	RB	2 July 1988 (aged 30)	(Algeria) ES Setif
29	(Algeria)	Rachid Bouhenna	CB	29 June 1991 (aged 27)	(Algeria) CS Constantine
	(Algeria)	Youcef Louzini		10 May 1999 (aged 19)	(Algeria) Reserve team
Midfielders
6	(Madagascar)	Ibrahim Amada	DM	28 February 1990 (aged 28)	(Algeria) ES Sétif
8	(Algeria)	Zakaria Haddouche	LW	19 August 1993 (aged 24)	(Algeria) ES Sétif
10	(Algeria)	Abderrahmane Bourdim	AM	14 June 1994 (aged 24)	(Algeria) USM Alger
11	(Algeria)	Oussama Tebbi	RW	23 September 1991 (aged 26)	(Algeria) RC Relizane
13	(Algeria)	Hichem Chérif El-Ouazzani	CM	1 January 1996 (aged 22)	(Algeria) Reserve team
18	(Mali)	Aliou Dieng	DM	16 October 1997 (aged 20)	(Mali) Djoliba AC
25	(Algeria)	Sofiane Bendebka	CM	9 August 1992 (aged 26)	(Algeria) NA Hussein Dey
28	(Algeria)	Abdelhak Messaoudi		16 March 1995 (aged 23)	(Algeria) Unknown
Forwards
7	(Algeria)	Mansour Benothmane	LW	10 August 1997 (aged 21)	(Tunisia) Club Africain
9	(Algeria)	Hichem Nekkache	ST	7 March 1991 (aged 27)	(Algeria) CR Belouizdad
17	(Algeria)	Walid Derrardja	AM	18 September 1990 (aged 27)	(Algeria) MC El Eulma
19	(Algeria)	Mohamed Souibaâh	ST	25 December 1991 (aged 26)	(Algeria) MC Oran
23	(Algeria)	Ilyes Chaïbi		12 October 1996 (aged 21)	(France) AS Monaco FC
26	(Algeria)	Abdelkrim Benarous		2 June 1997 (aged 21)	(Algeria) Reserve team

== Transfers ==
=== In ===
Date	Pos	Player	From club	Transfer fee	Source
25 May 2018	MF	(Algeria) Zakaria Haddouche	ES Sétif	Free transfer	
27 May 2018	DF	(Algeria) Islam Arous	Paradou AC	Free transfer	
28 May 2018	FW	(Algeria) Mansour Benothmane	(Tunisia) Club Africain	Free transfer	
13 June 2018	MF	(Algeria) Abderrahmane Bourdim	JS Saoura	Undisclosed	
13 July 2018	DF	(Algeria) Farès Hachi	(South Africa) Mamelodi Sundowns	Free transfer	
13 July 2018	MF	(Algeria) Oualid Mamoun	(France) Angers	Free transfer	
11 November 2018	MF	(Algeria) Mehdi Benaldjia	JS Kabylie	Free transfer	
17 December 2018	FW	(Algeria) Samy Frioui	(Greece) AEL Larissa	Free transfer	
2 January 2019	DF	(Algeria) Nabil Lamara	USM Bel Abbès	Free transfer	
14 January 2019	DF	(Algeria) Mohamed Merouani	ASO Chlef	16,500,000 DA	
15 January 2019	DF	(Algeria) Ryad Kenniche	CR Belouizdad	Free transfer	

=== Out ===
Date	Pos	Player	To club	Transfer fee	Source
6 June 2018	DF	(Algeria) Brahim Boudebouda	MC Oran	Free transfer	
19 June 2018	MF	(Algeria) Abdelaziz Amachi	DRB Tadjenanet	Undisclosed	
22 June 2018	DF	(Algeria) Zine El Abidine Boulekhoua	CR Belouizdad	Free transfer	
23 June 2018	FW	(Algeria) Abou Sofiane Balegh	CR Belouizdad	Free transfer (Released)	
23 June 2018	GK	(Algeria) Faouzi Chaouchi	CR Belouizdad	Free transfer (Released)	
27 June 2018	MF	(Algeria) Abdellah El Moudene	JS Kabylie	Free transfer	
5 July 2018	MF	(Algeria) Amir Karaoui	ES Sétif	Free transfer	
31 August 2018	DF	(Algeria) Rachid Bouhenna	(Scotland) Dundee United	Free transfer	
19 January 2019	DF	(Algeria) Zidane Mebarakou	(Saudi Arabia) Al-Wehda	Free transfer	

== Pre-season and friendlies ==
29 June 2018 Friendly	Clermont Foot (France)	0-1	(Algeria) MC Alger	Clermont-Ferrand
18:00 UTC+2		Report	Mamoun 74'	Stadium: Stade Gabriel Montpied

5 July 2018 Friendly	Grenoble Foot 38 (France)	1-1	(Algeria) MC Alger	Saint-Priest, Rhône
15:00 UTC+2	Belvito 46'	Report	Benothmane 65'	Stadium: La Bargette

9 July 2018 Friendly	Girondins de Bordeaux (France)	1-1	(Algeria) MC Alger	Moulins
18:30 UTC+2	Jovanović 70'	Report	Azzi 38'	Stadium: Hector-Rolland Stadium

== Competitions ==
=== Overview ===
Competition	Record								Started round	Final position / round	First match	Last match
Competition	G	W	D	L	GF	GA	GD	Win %	Started round	Final position / round	First match	Last match
Ligue 1	30	11	10	9	35	36	−1	36.67	—N/a	6th	13 August 2018	26 May 2019
Algerian Cup	3	2	0	1	3	1	+2	66.67	Round of 64	Round of 16	20 December 2018	23 January 2019
Champions League	4	0	1	3	2	6	−4	0.00	Group stage		17 July 2018	28 August 2018
Club Championship	6	3	2	1	5	5	+0	50.00	First round	Quarter-finals	9 August 2018	16 February 2019
Total	43	16	13	14	45	48	−3	37.21				

Updated to match played 28 May 2018
Source: Competitions

=== Ligue 1 ===
==== League table ====
Pos	Team	Pld	W	D	L	GF	GA	GD	Pts	Qualification or relegation
4	JS Saoura	30	13	8	9	33	22	+11	47	Qualification for Arab Club Champions Cup
5	ES Sétif	30	13	6	11	34	24	+10	45	
6	MC Alger	30	11	10	9	35	36	−1	43	Qualification for Arab Club Champions Cup
7	CS Constantine	30	10	10	10	30	24	+6	40	Qualification for Arab Club Champions Cup
8	CR Belouizdad	30	10	11	9	28	27	+1	38 (Note: CR Belouizdad were deducted 3 points.)	Qualification for Confederation Cup (Note: CR Belouizdad are Algerian Cup winners.)

Source: DZFoot
Rules for classification: 1) points; 2) head-to-head points; 3) head-to-head goal difference; 4) goal difference; 5) total goals; 6) fairplay ranking; 7) playoff.

==== Results summary ====
Overall								Home						Away					
Pld	W	D	L	GF	GA	GD	Pts	W	D	L	GF	GA	GD	W	D	L	GF	GA	GD
27	10	9	8	30	32	−2	39	6	4	3	16	15	+1	4	5	5	14	17	−3

Last updated: 28 May 2018.
Source: Competitive matches

==== Results by round ====
Round	1	2	3	4	5	6	7	8	9	10	11	12	13	14	15	16	17	18	19	20	21	22	23	24	25	26	27	28	29	30
Ground	H	A	A	H	A	H	A	H	A	H	A	H	A	H	A	A	H	H	A	H	A	H	A	H	A	H	A	H	A	H
Result	D	W	D	L	W	L	L	W	D	W	W	D	D	L	D	W	W	D	L	W	D	W	L	W	L	D	L	D	L	W
Position	12	5	5	9	7	9	11	7	8	5	4	5	5	7	6	4	4	3	5	4	5	4	5	4	4	4	7	6	7	6

Updated to match(es) played on 16 May 2019. Source: Competitive matches
A = Away; H = Home; W = Win; D = Draw; L = Loss

=== Matches ===
Win Draw Loss

13 August 2018 Round 1	MC Alger	1–1	Paradou AC	Algiers
20:00	Derrardja 79' (pen.)	Soccerway report	Naidji 65'	Stadium: Stade du 5 Juillet; Referee: Lotfi Bekouassa

25 August 2018 Round 2	DRB Tadjenanet	0–1	MC Alger	Tadjenanet
17:00		Soccerway report	Nekkache 7'	Stadium: Lahoua Smaïl Stadium; Referee: Mohamed Saïdi

1 September 2018 Round 4	MC Alger	0–1	ES Sétif	Algiers
21:00		Soccerway report	Djahnit 51'	Stadium: Stade du 5 Juillet; Referee: Mustapha Bessiri

4 September 2018 Round 3	CR Belouizdad	0–0	MC Alger	Belouizdad
17:00		Soccerway report		Stadium: Stade 20 Août 1955; Referee: Lotfi Bekouassa

11 September 2018 Round 5	Olympique de Médéa	1–2	MC Alger	Médéa
17:00	Benamar 8'	Soccerway report	Souibaâh 34'; Nekkache 66'	Stadium: Stade Imam Lyes de Médéa; Referee: Farouk Mial

16 September 2018 Round 6	MC Alger	0–5	JS Kabylie	Bologhine
17:00		Soccerway report	Nwofor 9', 90'; Benyoucef 12'; Abdul Razak 33'; Chetti 70'	Stadium: Omar Hamadi Stadium; Attendance: 0 (close doors); Referee: Redouane Necib

22 September 2018 Round 7	MC Oran	4–3	MC Alger	Oran
19:00	Hammar 2'; Mansouri 33'; Nadji 37'; Bouchar 75'	Soccerway report	Bendebka 44'; Nekkache 49'; Amada 61'	Stadium: Ahmed Zabana Stadium; Referee: Rafik Achouri

6 October 2018 Round 9	USM Alger	0–0	MC Alger	Algiers
17:45		Soccerway report		Stadium: Stade du 5 Juillet; Referee: Mehdi Abid Charef

11 October 2018 Round 10	MC Alger	2–1	NA Hussein Dey	Algiers
17:45	Azzi 17'; Bendebka 74'	Soccerway report	Dib 90+1'	Stadium: Stade du 5 Juillet; Referee: Farouk Mial

15 October 2018 Round 8	MC Alger	2–1	CS Constantine	Algiers
17:45	Hachoud 15'; Bendebka 88'	Soccerway report	Salhi 26'	Stadium: Stade du 5 Juillet; Referee: Nabil Boukhalfa

20 October 2018 Round 11	CA Bordj Bou Arreridj	0–1	MC Alger	Bordj Bou Arréridj
17:45		Soccerway report	Azzi 71'	Stadium: Stade 20 Août 1955; Referee: Lahlou Benbraham

30 October 2018 Round 12	MC Alger	0–0	JS Saoura	Algiers
18:00		Soccerway report		Stadium: Stade du 5 Juillet; Referee: Mustapha Ghorbal

13 November 2018 Round 14	MC Alger	0–1	USM Bel Abbès	Algiers
18:00		Soccerway report	Khali 43'	Stadium: Stade du 5 Juillet; Referee: Lahlou Benbraham

17 November 2018 Round 13	MO Béjaïa	1–1	MC Alger	Béjaïa
18:00	Kadri 36' (pen.)	Soccerway report	Nekkache 29'	Stadium: Stade de l'Unité Maghrébine; Referee: Mustapha Bessiri

21 November 2018 Round 15	AS Ain M'lila	1–1	MC Alger	Batna
18:00	Benchaira 48'	Soccerway report	Souibaâh 45'	Stadium: November 1, 1954 Stadium; Referee: Farouk Mial

5 January 2019 Round 16	Paradou AC	0–1	MC Alger	Bologhine
17:45		Soccerway report	Mebarakou 45'	Stadium: Omar Hamadi Stadium; Referee: Lyés Bekouassa

11 January 2019 Round 17	MC Alger	4–1	DRB Tadjenanet	Algiers
18:00	Souibaâh 27', 88'; Haddouche 60'; Bourdim 69'	Soccerway report	Sai 85'	Stadium: Stade du 5 Juillet; Referee: Lahlou Benbraham

17 January 2019 Round 18	MC Alger	1–1	CR Belouizdad	Algiers
17:45	Souibaâh 50'	Soccerway report	Balegh 71'	Stadium: Stade du 5 Juillet; Referee: Rafik Achouri

26 January 2019 (Note: The match was originally to be played on 26 January 2019, 16:00, but it was postponed due to heavy snowfall.) Round 19	ES Sétif	–	MC Alger	Sétif
16:00		Soccerway report		Stadium: Stade 8 Mai 1945; Referee: Farouk Mial

5 February 2019 Round 20	MC Alger	2–1	Olympique de Médéa	Algiers
18:00	Hachi 15'; Amada 68'	Soccerway report	Sameur 90+2' (pen.)	Stadium: Stade du 5 Juillet; Referee: Merzoug Brahimi

9 February 2019 Round 21	JS Kabylie	1–1	MC Alger	Tizi Ouzou
17:45	Saâdou 67'	Soccerway report	Frioui 44'	Stadium: November 1, 1954 Stadium; Referee: Mohamed Saïdi

9 March 2019 Round 19	ES Sétif	2–0	MC Alger	Sétif
17:45	Bouguelmouna 30' (pen.), 83'	Soccerway report		Stadium: Stade 8 Mai 1945; Referee: Farouk Mial

14 March 2019 Round 24	MC Alger	3–2	USM Alger	Algiers
17:00	Benaldjia 41'; Bendebka 56'; Lamara 89' (pen.)	Soccerway report Live TV: Canal Algérie	Zouari 52'; Benyahia 85'	Stadium: Stade du 5 Juillet; Referee: Mehdi Abid Charef

2 April 2019 Round 25	NA Hussein Dey	1–0	MC Alger	Belouizdad
16:00	Mouaki Dadi 2'	Soccerway report		Stadium: Stade 20 Août 1955; Referee: Rafik Achouri

9 April 2019 Round 22	MC Alger	1–0	MC Oran	Algiers
17:45	Frioui 84'	Soccerway report		Stadium: Stade du 5 Juillet; Referee: Farouk Mial

21 April 2019 Round 26	MC Alger	0–0	CA Bordj Bou Arreridj	Algiers
16:00		Soccerway report		Stadium: Stade du 5 Juillet; Referee: Lahlou Benbraham

1 May 2019 Round 23	CS Constantine	2–0	MC Alger	Constantine
17:00	Bencherifa 37'; Belkacemi 40'	Soccerway report		Stadium: Stade Mohamed Hamlaoui; Referee: Mohamed Saïdi

11 May 2019 Round 27	JS Saoura	4–3	MC Alger	Béchar
22:30	Bekakchi 22'; Hammia 36' (pen.); Lahmeri 50'; Saâd 67'	Soccerway report	Bendebka 31'; Frioui 45+1' (pen.); Nekkache 82'	Stadium: Stade 20 Août 1955; Referee: Farouk Mial

16 May 2019 Round 28	MC Alger	0–0	MO Béjaïa	Algiers
22:30		Soccerway report		Stadium: Stade du 5 Juillet; Referee: Nabil Boukhalfa

21 May 2019 Round 29	USM Bel Abbès	2–1	MC Alger	Sidi Bel Abbès
22:30	Benayad 77', 80'	Soccerway report	Dieng 72'	Stadium: Stade 24 Fevrier 1956; Referee: Boubekeur Zouaoui

26 May 2019 Round 30	MC Alger	4–2	AS Ain M'lila	Algiers
22:30	Amada 18'; Souibaâh 53'; Frioui 88'; Nekkache 90+1'	Soccerway report	Tiaiba 63'; Mahious 75'	Stadium: Stade du 5 Juillet; Referee: Lahlou Benbraham

=== Algerian Cup ===
20 December 2018 Round of 64	RC Kouba	0–3	MC Alger	Algiers
19:00		Report	Mebarakou 15'; Souiba 33', 48'	Stadium: July 5, 1962 Stadium; Referee: Mustapha Ghorbal

1 January 2019 Round of 32	CR Village Moussa	0–3	MC Alger	Jijel
16:00		Match stopped at 41' due to supporters violence	Bourdim 2' (pen.); Souibaâh 17'; Benchouib 30' (o.g.)	Stadium: Rouibah Hocine Stadium; Referee: Ahmed Bouzrar

23 January 2019 Round of 16	NA Hussein Dey	1–0	MC Alger	Belouizdad
15:00	Gasmi 84' (pen.)			Stadium: Stade 20 Août 1955; Referee: Said Aouina

=== Champions League ===
==== Group stage ====
Pos	Team	Pld	W	D	L	GF	GA	GD	Pts	Qualification	TPM	ESS	DHJ	MCA
1	(Democratic Republic of the Congo) TP Mazembe	6	3	3	0	10	4	+6	12	Quarter-finals	—	4–1	1–1	1–0
2	(Algeria) ES Sétif	6	2	2	2	7	9	−2	8	Quarter-finals	1–1	—	2–1	0–1
3	(Morocco) Difaâ El Jadidi	6	1	3	2	6	7	−1	6		0–2	1–1	—	2–0
4	(Algeria) MC Alger	6	1	2	3	4	7	−3	5		1–1	1–2	1–1	—

Source: CAF

17 July 2018 3	TP Mazembe (Democratic Republic of the Congo)	1–0	(Algeria) MC Alger	Lubumbashi
15:00 UTC+2	Meschak 88'	Report		Stadium: Stade TP Mazembe; Referee: Hélder Martins de Carvalho (Angola)

28 July 2018 4	MC Alger (Algeria)	1–1	(Democratic Republic of the Congo) TP Mazembe	Blida (Note: MC Alger played their home match against TP Mazembe at Mustapha Tchaker Stadium, Blida, instead of their regular stadium July 5, 1962 Stadium, Algiers, due to 2018 African Youth Games.)
20:00 UTC+1	Derrardja 70'	Report	Meschak 48'	Stadium: Mustapha Tchaker Stadium; Referee: Bakary Gassama (Gambia)

18 August 2018 5	Difaâ El Jadidi (Morocco)	2–0	(Algeria) MC Alger	El Jadida
20:00 UTC+1	El Megri 29'; Msuva 75'	Report		Stadium: Stade El Abdi; Referee: Davies Omweno (Kenya)

28 August 2018 6	MC Alger (Algeria)	1–2	(Algeria) ES Sétif	Algiers
14:00 UTC+1	Derrardja 41'	Report	Djahnit 5'; Bouguelmouna 27'	Stadium: Stade du 5-Juillet-1962; Referee: Bamlak Tessema Weyesa (Ethiopia)

=== Club Championship Cup ===
==== First round ====
9 August 2018 First leg	Al-Riffa (Bahrain)	1–2	(Algeria) MC Alger	Riffa
19:00 UTC+3	Ali Harm 40'	DZfoot report Live TV: Abu Dhabi Sports	Derrardja 4'; Bourdim 59'	Stadium: Bahrain National Stadium; Referee: Shukri Al-Hunfush (Saudi Arabia)

28 September 2018 Second leg	MC Alger (Algeria)	0–0	(Bahrain) Al-Riffa	Algiers
19:00 UTC+1		DZfoot report Live TV: Abu Dhabi Sports		Stadium: 5 July Stadium; Referee: Ali Lemghaifry (Mauritania)

==== Second round ====
6 November 2018 First leg	Al-Nassr (Saudi Arabia)	0–1	(Algeria) MC Alger	Riyadh
20:00 UTC+3		DZfoot report Live TV: Abu Dhabi Sports	Derrardja 61'	Stadium: Prince Faisal bin Fahd Stadium; Referee: Redouane Jiyed (Morocco)

27 November 2018 Second leg	MC Alger (Algeria)	2–1	(Saudi Arabia) Al-Nassr	Algiers
19:00 UTC+2	Mebarakou 31'; Hamdallah 65' (o.g.)	DZfoot report Live TV: Abu Dhabi Sports	Al-Shehri 90+5'	Stadium: Stade du 5 Juillet 1962; Referee: Adham Makhadmeh (Jordan)

==== Quarter-finals ====
31 January 2019 First leg	MC Alger (Algeria)	0–0	(Sudan) Al-Merrikh	Algiers
19:00 UTC+1		Report		Stadium: Stade du 5 Juillet 1962; Referee: Youssef Essrayri (Tunisia)

16 February 2019 Second leg	Al-Merrikh (Sudan)	3–0	(Algeria) MC Alger	Omdurman
19:00 UTC+2	Al-Rashed 25'; Abdel Rahman 32', 68'	Report		Stadium: Al-Merrikh Stadium; Referee: Turki Al Khudair (Saudi Arabia)

== Squad information ==
=== Playing statistics ===
No.	Pos	Nat	Player	Total		Ligue 1		Algerian Cup		Champions League		Club Championship	
No.	Pos	Nat	Player	Apps	Goals	Apps	Goals	Apps	Goals	Apps	Goals	Apps	Goals
30	GK	(Algeria) ALG	Farid Chaâl	39	0	27	0	2	0	4	0	6	0
16	GK	(Algeria) ALG	Abdelkader Morcely	3	0	3	0	0	0	0	0	0	0
22	DF	(Algeria) ALG	Ayoub Azzi	25	2	16	2	1	0	4	0	4	0
24	DF	(Algeria) ALG	Abdelghani Demmou	21	0	17	0	1	0	2	0	1	0
27	DF	(Algeria) ALG	Abderahmane Hachoud	31	1	20	1	2	0	3	0	6	0
20	DF	(Algeria) ALG	Islam Arous	25	0	21	0	0	0	2	0	2	0
5	DF	(Algeria) ALG	Farès Hachi	15	1	10	1	0	0	2	0	3	0
4	DF	(Algeria) ALG	Ryad Kenniche	4	0	4	0	0	0	0	0	0	0
3	DF	(Algeria) ALG	Nabil Lamara	17	1	14	1	1	0	0	0	2	0
2	DF	(Algeria) ALG	Mohamed Merouani	15	0	12	0	1	0	0	0	2	0
	DF	(Algeria) ALG	Chems Eddine Nerier	3	0	3	0	0	0	0	0	0	0
	DF	(Algeria) ALG	Youcef Louzini	2	0	2	0	0	0	0	0	0	0
13	MF	(Algeria) ALG	Hichem Chérif El-Ouazzani	16	0	11	0	1	0	2	0	2	0
3	MF	(Madagascar) MAD	Ibrahim Amada	26	3	18	3	0	0	4	0	4	0
25	MF	(Algeria) ALG	Sofiane Bendebka	36	5	24	5	2	0	4	0	6	0
18	MF	(Mali) MLI	Aliou Dieng	38	1	27	1	2	0	4	0	5	0
11	MF	(Algeria) ALG	Oussama Tebbi	21	0	17	0	0	0	2	0	2	0
8	MF	(Algeria) ALG	Zakaria Haddouche	28	1	20	1	2	0	0	0	6	0
10	MF	(Algeria) ALG	Abderrahmane Bourdim	31	2	22	1	1	0	3	0	5	1
2	MF	(Algeria) ALG	Oualid Mamoun	1	0	1	0	0	0	0	0	0	0
14	MF	(Algeria) ALG	Mehdi Benaldjia	16	1	12	1	2	0	0	0	2	0
	MF	(Algeria) ALG	Mohamed Ridha Djahdou	1	0	1	0	0	0	0	0	0	0
26	FW	(Algeria) ALG	Abdelkrim Benarous	11	0	10	0	0	0	0	0	1	0
8	FW	(Algeria) ALG	Ilyes Chaïbi	5	0	4	0	0	0	1	0	0	0
9	FW	(Algeria) ALG	Hichem Nekkache	26	6	21	6	0	0	3	0	2	0
17	FW	(Algeria) ALG	Walid Derrardja	29	5	19	1	2	0	4	2	4	2
19	FW	(Algeria) ALG	Mohamed Souibaâh	32	8	23	6	2	2	3	0	4	0
5	FW	(Algeria) ALG	Samy Frioui	16	4	14	4	1	0	0	0	1	0
Players transferred out during the season
29	DF	(Algeria) ALG	Rachid Bouhenna	5	0	2	0	0	0	2	0	1	0
15	DF	(Algeria) ALG	Zidane Mebarakou	23	3	15	1	1	1	3	0	4	1
7	FW	(Algeria) ALG	Mansour Benothmane	10	0	7	0	0	0	2	0	1	0

Last updated: 28 May 2018
Source: fr.soccerway.com
