= List of Algerian football transfers summer 2015 =

This is a list of Algerian football transfers in the 2015 summer transfer window by club. Clubs in the 2015–16 Algerian Ligue Professionnelle 1 are included.

== Ligue Professionnelle 1 ==
=== ASM Oran ===
In: Note: Flags indicate national team as defined under FIFA eligibility rules; some limited exceptions apply. Players may hold more than one non-FIFA nationality.

No.	Pos.	Nation	Player
—	DF	ALG	[[]] (from (Algeria) [[]])

Out: Note: Flags indicate national team as defined under FIFA eligibility rules; some limited exceptions apply. Players may hold more than one non-FIFA nationality.

No.	Pos.	Nation	Player
—	DF	ALG	[[]] (to (Algeria) [[]])

=== CR Belouizdad ===
In: Note: Flags indicate national team as defined under FIFA eligibility rules; some limited exceptions apply. Players may hold more than one non-FIFA nationality.

No.	Pos.	Nation	Player

Out: Note: Flags indicate national team as defined under FIFA eligibility rules; some limited exceptions apply. Players may hold more than one non-FIFA nationality.

No.	Pos.	Nation	Player

=== CS Constantine ===
In: Note: Flags indicate national team as defined under FIFA eligibility rules; some limited exceptions apply. Players may hold more than one non-FIFA nationality.

No.	Pos.	Nation	Player

Out: Note: Flags indicate national team as defined under FIFA eligibility rules; some limited exceptions apply. Players may hold more than one non-FIFA nationality.

No.	Pos.	Nation	Player

=== DRB Tadjenanet ===
In: Note: Flags indicate national team as defined under FIFA eligibility rules; some limited exceptions apply. Players may hold more than one non-FIFA nationality.

No.	Pos.	Nation	Player

Out: Note: Flags indicate national team as defined under FIFA eligibility rules; some limited exceptions apply. Players may hold more than one non-FIFA nationality.

No.	Pos.	Nation	Player

=== ES Sétif ===
In: Note: Flags indicate national team as defined under FIFA eligibility rules; some limited exceptions apply. Players may hold more than one non-FIFA nationality.

No.	Pos.	Nation	Player
—	MF	ALG	Walid Chenine (from (France) US Colomiers)
—	FW	ALG	Adam Tobbal (from (England) Fulham U21)
—	DF	ALG	Farès Hachi (from (France) Grenoble Foot 38)
—	DF	ALG	Miloud Rebiai (from (Algeria) WA Tlemcen)
—	DF	ALG	Djamel Benlamri (from (Algeria) JS Kabylie)
—	DF	ALG	Ryad Kenniche (from (Algeria) USM El Harrach)
—	MF	ALG	Zakaria Haddouche (from (Algeria) ASO Chlef)
—	MF	MAD	Ibrahim Amada (from (Algeria) USM El Harrach)

Out: Note: Flags indicate national team as defined under FIFA eligibility rules; some limited exceptions apply. Players may hold more than one non-FIFA nationality.

No.	Pos.	Nation	Player
—	DF	ALG	Abdelghani Demmou (to (Algeria) MC Alger)
—	DF	ALG	Farid Mellouli (to (Saudi Arabia) Al-Qadsiah FC)
—	DF	ALG	Mohamed Lagraâ (to (Algeria) JS Saoura)
—	MF	ALG	Akram Djahnit (to (Kuwait) Al-Arabi SC)

=== JS Kabylie ===
In: Note: Flags indicate national team as defined under FIFA eligibility rules; some limited exceptions apply. Players may hold more than one non-FIFA nationality.

No.	Pos.	Nation	Player

Out: Note: Flags indicate national team as defined under FIFA eligibility rules; some limited exceptions apply. Players may hold more than one non-FIFA nationality.

No.	Pos.	Nation	Player

=== JS Saoura ===
In: Note: Flags indicate national team as defined under FIFA eligibility rules; some limited exceptions apply. Players may hold more than one non-FIFA nationality.

No.	Pos.	Nation	Player

Out: Note: Flags indicate national team as defined under FIFA eligibility rules; some limited exceptions apply. Players may hold more than one non-FIFA nationality.

No.	Pos.	Nation	Player

=== MC Alger ===
In: Note: Flags indicate national team as defined under FIFA eligibility rules; some limited exceptions apply. Players may hold more than one non-FIFA nationality.

No.	Pos.	Nation	Player
—	DF	ALG	Rachid Bouhenna (from (Algeria) CS Constantine)
—	MF	ALG	Abdelmalek Mokdad (from (Algeria) RC Arbaâ)
—	GK	ALG	Jonathan Matijas (from (Algeria) USM Bel-Abbès)
—	FW	ALG	Kheiredine Merzougi (from (Algeria) RC Relizane)
—	DF	ALG	Abdelghani Demmou (from (Algeria) ES Sétif)
—	MF	ALG	Mehdi Kacem (Loan return from (Algeria) RC Arbaâ)
—	FW	ETH	Saladin Said (from (Egypt) Al Ahly SC)
—	FW	ALG	Lamine Abid (Loan from (Algeria) USM El Harrach)
—	FW	ALG	Walid Derrardja (from (Algeria) MC El Eulma)

Out: Note: Flags indicate national team as defined under FIFA eligibility rules; some limited exceptions apply. Players may hold more than one non-FIFA nationality.

No.	Pos.	Nation	Player

=== MC Oran ===
In: Note: Flags indicate national team as defined under FIFA eligibility rules; some limited exceptions apply. Players may hold more than one non-FIFA nationality.

No.	Pos.	Nation	Player

Out: Note: Flags indicate national team as defined under FIFA eligibility rules; some limited exceptions apply. Players may hold more than one non-FIFA nationality.

No.	Pos.	Nation	Player

=== MO Béjaïa ===
In: Note: Flags indicate national team as defined under FIFA eligibility rules; some limited exceptions apply. Players may hold more than one non-FIFA nationality.

No.	Pos.	Nation	Player
—	FW	ALG	Billel Mebarki (from (Algeria) USM El Harrach)
—	MF	ALG	Abou El Kacem Hadji (from (Algeria) CS Constantine)
—	GK	ALG	Amara Daïf (from (Algeria) ASO Chlef)
—	MF	ALG	Saad Tedjar (from (Algeria) ASO Chlef)
—	DF	ALG	Maamar Youcef (from (Algeria) RC Relizane)
—	DF	ALG	Adel Lakhdari (from (Algeria) ASO Chlef)
—	DF	ALG	Sofiane Khadir (from (Algeria) MC Alger)
—	MF	ALG	Benaouda Bendjelloul (from (Algeria) ASM Oran)
—	DF	ALG	Lyes Boukria (from (Algeria) ES Sétif)
—	MF	ALG	Karim Meliani (from (Algeria) ASO Chlef)
—	FW	ALG	Ismail Belkacemi (from (Algeria) USMM Hadjout)
—	FW	SEN	Mohamed Waliou Ndoye (from (Senegal) Stade de Mbour)

Out: Note: Flags indicate national team as defined under FIFA eligibility rules; some limited exceptions apply. Players may hold more than one non-FIFA nationality.

No.	Pos.	Nation	Player

=== RC Arbaâ ===
In: Note: Flags indicate national team as defined under FIFA eligibility rules; some limited exceptions apply. Players may hold more than one non-FIFA nationality.

No.	Pos.	Nation	Player

Out: Note: Flags indicate national team as defined under FIFA eligibility rules; some limited exceptions apply. Players may hold more than one non-FIFA nationality.

No.	Pos.	Nation	Player

=== RC Relizane ===
In: Note: Flags indicate national team as defined under FIFA eligibility rules; some limited exceptions apply. Players may hold more than one non-FIFA nationality.

No.	Pos.	Nation	Player

Out: Note: Flags indicate national team as defined under FIFA eligibility rules; some limited exceptions apply. Players may hold more than one non-FIFA nationality.

No.	Pos.	Nation	Player

=== NA Hussein Dey ===
In: Note: Flags indicate national team as defined under FIFA eligibility rules; some limited exceptions apply. Players may hold more than one non-FIFA nationality.

No.	Pos.	Nation	Player

Out: Note: Flags indicate national team as defined under FIFA eligibility rules; some limited exceptions apply. Players may hold more than one non-FIFA nationality.

No.	Pos.	Nation	Player

=== USM Alger ===
In: Note: Flags indicate national team as defined under FIFA eligibility rules; some limited exceptions apply. Players may hold more than one non-FIFA nationality.

No.	Pos.	Nation	Player
—	DF	ALG	Arslane Mazari (from (Algeria) USM El Harrach)
—	GK	ALG	Ismaïl Mansouri (Loan return from (Algeria) MO Béjaïa)
—	DF	ALG	Houcine Benayada (from (Algeria) ASM Oran)
—	FW	ALG	Oussama Darfalou (from (Algeria) RC Arbaâ)
—	FW	ALG	Mohamed Amine Aoudia (from (Germany) FSV Frankfurt)

Out: Note: Flags indicate national team as defined under FIFA eligibility rules; some limited exceptions apply. Players may hold more than one non-FIFA nationality.

No.	Pos.	Nation	Player
—	MF	ALG	Bouazza Feham (to (Algeria) CR Belouizdad)
—	MF	ALG	Abdelkader Laïfaoui (to (Algeria) USM Blida)
—	MF	ALG	Abderrahmane Bourdim (Loan to (Algeria) RC Relizane)
—	FW	ALG	Abderrahmane Meziane (Loan to (Algeria) RC Arbaâ)
—	FW	ALG	Mohamed Taib (Loan to (Algeria) RC Arbaâ)
—	GK	ALG	Sid Ahmed Rafik Mazouzi (to (Algeria) RC Arbaâ)
—	DF	ALG	Mohamed Amrane (to (Algeria) DRB Tadjenanet)
—	FW	CIV	Manucho (Loan to (Algeria) RC Relizane)

=== USM Blida ===
In: Note: Flags indicate national team as defined under FIFA eligibility rules; some limited exceptions apply. Players may hold more than one non-FIFA nationality.

No.	Pos.	Nation	Player

Out: Note: Flags indicate national team as defined under FIFA eligibility rules; some limited exceptions apply. Players may hold more than one non-FIFA nationality.

No.	Pos.	Nation	Player

=== USM El Harrach ===
In: Note: Flags indicate national team as defined under FIFA eligibility rules; some limited exceptions apply. Players may hold more than one non-FIFA nationality.

No.	Pos.	Nation	Player
—	GK	ALG	Moustapha Zeghba (from (Algeria) AB Merouana)
—	MF	ALG	Farid Boughida (from (France) Bergerac Périgord)
—	MF	GUI	Mohamed Coumbassa (from (Guinea) Horoya AC)
—	DF	ALG	Ahmed Boumediene (from (Algeria) IRB El Hadjar)
—	DF	ALG	Abderrahim Salem Dekhinet (from (Algeria) CA Batna)
—	DF	ALG	Hadj Cheikh Boucherit (from (Algeria) AHM Hassi Messaoud)
—	FW	ALG	Sofiane Younes (from (Algeria) ES Sétif)

Out: Note: Flags indicate national team as defined under FIFA eligibility rules; some limited exceptions apply. Players may hold more than one non-FIFA nationality.

No.	Pos.	Nation	Player
—	DF	ALG	Ryad Kenniche (to (Algeria) ES Sétif)
—	MF	ALG	Ibrahim Amada (to (Algeria) ES Sétif)
—	FW	ALG	Lamine Abid (to (Algeria) MC Alger)
