= 2022–23 MC Alger season =

MC Alger
2022–23 season
- Owner: Sonatrach
- President: Mohamed Hakim Hadj Redjem
- Head coach: Faruk Hadžibegić (from 16 July 2022) (until 10 September 2022); Faouzi Benzarti (from 25 September 2022) (until 15 February 2023); Patrice Beaumelle (from 3 March 2023)
- Stadium: Omar Benrabah Stadium
- Ligue 1: 4th
- Algerian Cup: Round of 64
- Top goalscorer: League: Kheireddine Merzougui (4 goals); All: Kheireddine Merzougui (4 goals)
- Biggest win: CS Constantine 0–2 MC Alger; MC Alger 2–0 RC Arbaâ
- Biggest defeat: MC Oran 3–0 MC Alger
Home colours	Away colours	Third colours

The 2022–23 season, is MC Alger's 54th season and the club's 19th consecutive season in the top flight of Algerian football. In addition to the domestic league, MC Alger participated in the Algerian Cup.

== Season summary ==
On 16 July 2022, Faruk Hadžibegić was appointed as a new head coach. On 20 July 2022, MC Alger agreed with the Rouïba municipality to receive their opponents for the first leg in Salem Mabrouki Stadium, after the closure of the Stade du 5 Juillet for renovation. On September 10, Faruk Hadžibegić was dismissed from his post after only three matches, the contract was canceled by mutual consent.

== Squad list ==
Players and squad numbers last updated on 5 February 2023.
Note: Flags indicate national team as has been defined under FIFA eligibility rules. Players may hold more than one non-FIFA nationality.

No.	Nat.	Position	Name	Date of Birth (Age)	Signed from
Goalkeepers
1	(Algeria)	GK	Farid Chaâl	3 July 1994 (aged 28)	(Algeria) Youth system
2	(Algeria)	GK	Abdelatif Ramdane	19 May 2001 (aged 21)	(Algeria) JS Kabylie
16	(Algeria)	GK	Oussama Litim	3 June 1990 (aged 32)	(Saudi Arabia) Al-Ain
Defenders
3	(Algeria)	CB	Boualem Mesmoudi	15 April 1994 (aged 28)	(Qatar) Al-Wakrah SC
5	(Algeria)	CB	Ayoub Abdellaoui	16 February 1993 (aged 29)	(Saudi Arabia) Ettifaq FC
12	(Algeria)	CB	Mohamed Merouani	29 August 1997 (aged 25)	(Algeria) ASO Chlef
14	(Algeria)	LB	Hamza Mouali	16 January 1998 (aged 24)	(France) Stade Lavallois
15	(Algeria)	LB	Houari Ferhani	11 February 1993 (aged 29)	(Algeria) ES Sétif
17	(Algeria)	RB	Kamel Hamidi	May 1, 1996 (aged 26)	(Algeria) MC Oran
19	(Algeria)	CB	Ayoub Ghezala	December 6, 1995 (aged 27)	(Algeria) USM Annaba
20	(Algeria)	RB	Réda Halaïmia	August 28, 1996 (aged 26)	(Algeria) Beerschot
31	(Algeria)	CB	Abdelkader Menezla	January 6, 2001 (aged 21)	(Algeria) USM Bel Abbès
Midfielders
4	(Algeria)	MF	Tayeb Hamoudi	10 February 1995 (aged 27)	(Algeria) Paradou AC
6	(Algeria)	MF	Mohamed Benkhemassa	28 June 1993 (aged 29)	(Egypt) Ismaily SC
8	(Algeria)	MF	Féth-Allah Tahar	22 January 1994 (aged 28)	(Algeria) ASO Chlef
13	(Algeria)	MF	Aziz Benabdi	9 August 1993 (aged 29)	(Morocco) Hassania Agadir
22	(Algeria)	MF	Khalid Dahmani	25 November 1999 (aged 23)	(Algeria) ASO Chlef
25	(Algeria)	MF	Badreddine Touki	25 September 1999 (aged 23)	(Algeria) WA Boufarik
26	(Algeria)	MF	Moundhir Bouzekri	16 December 2001 (aged 21)	(Algeria) Youth system
Forwards
7	(Algeria)	FW	Abdelmalek Oukil	7 July 1996 (aged 26)	(Algeria) RC Arbaâ
9	(Algeria)	FW	Ali Haroun	1 February 1997 (aged 25)	(Morocco) MC Oujda
10	(Ghana)	FW	Joseph Esso	10 December 1996 (aged 26)	(Ghana) Dreams FC
11	(Madagascar)	FW	Razafindranaivo Koloina	5 March 2000 (aged 22)	(Madagascar) CFF Andoharanofotsy
18	(Algeria)	FW	Kheireddine Merzougui	16 August 1992 (aged 30)	(Algeria) CR Belouizdad
21	(Algeria)	FW	Aymene Rahmani	16 May 2001 (aged 21)	(Algeria) Youth system
23	(Algeria)	FW	Chouaib Debbih	1 January 1993 (aged 30)	(Algeria) CS Constantine
24	(Algeria)	FW	Mohamed Ramzi Haif	25 June 2001 (aged 21)	(Algeria) Youth system

== Transfers ==
=== In ===
==== Summer ====
Date	Pos	Player	From club	Transfer fee	Source
16 June 2022	FW	(Algeria) Abdelmalek Oukil	RC Arbaâ	Free transfer	
19 June 2022	LB	(Algeria) Houari Ferhani	ES Sétif	Free transfer	
20 June 2022	CB	(Algeria) Abdelkader Menezla	USM Bel Abbès	Free transfer	
23 June 2022	FW	(Nigeria) Victor Mbaoma	(Nigeria) Enyimba	Free transfer	
23 June 2022	FW	(Algeria) Idir Boutrif	(Luxembourg) CS Fola Esch	Free transfer	
29 June 2022	MF	(Algeria) Tayeb Hamoudi	Paradou AC	Free transfer	
30 June 2022	MF	(Algeria) Khalid Dahamni	ASO Chlef	Free transfer	
2 July 2022	CB	(Algeria) Boualem Mesmoudi	(Qatar) Al-Wakrah SC	Free transfer	
3 July 2022	FW	(Algeria) Chouaib Debbih	CS Constantine	Free transfer	
12 July 2022	CB	(Algeria) Ayoub Abdellaoui	(Saudi Arabia) Ettifaq FC	Free transfer	
1 August 2022	FW	(Algeria) Kheireddine Merzougui	CR Belouizdad	Free transfer	
2 August 2022	RB	(Algeria) Réda Halaïmia	(Belgium) Beerschot	Free transfer	
4 August 2022	MF	(Algeria) Aziz Benabdi	(Morocco) Hassania Agadir	Free transfer	

==== Winter ====
Date	Pos	Player	From club	Transfer fee	Source
23 January 2023	MF	(Algeria) Mohamed Benkhemassa	(Egypt) Ismaily SC	Free transfer	
30 January 2023	FW	(Madagascar) Razafindranaivo Koloina	(Madagascar) CFF Andoharanofotsy	Free transfer	
1 February 2023	LB	(Algeria) Hamza Mouali	(France) Stade Lavallois	Free transfer	
1 February 2023	FW	(Algeria) Ali Haroun	(Morocco) MC Oujda	Free transfer	

=== Out ===
==== Summer ====
Date	Pos	Player	To club	Transfer fee	Source
10 June 2022	RB	(Algeria) Abderahmane Hachoud	Unattached	Released	
5 July 2022	RB	(Algeria) Aymen Attou	Unattached (Note: Attou joined USM Khenchela on 8 August 2022.)	Released	
12 July 2022	LB	(Algeria) Mohamed Amine Ezzemani	Unattached (Note: Ezzemani joined MC Oran on 1 August 2022.)	Released	
13 July 2022	FW	(Algeria) Mohamed El Seddik Benbournane	Unattached (Note: Attou joined ASO Chlef on 29 July 2022.)	Released	
14 July 2022	CB	(Algeria) Mouad Hadded	CR Belouizdad	Free transfer	
17 July 2022	MF	(Ivory Coast) Isla Daoudi Diomande	Unattached	Released	
24 July 2022	FW	(Algeria) Samy Frioui	(Bahrain) Al-Khaldiya SC	Free transfer	
24 July 2022	FW	(Algeria) Hamza Zaidi	Unattached (Note: Zaidi joined USM Khenchela on 8 August 2022.)	Released	
31 July 2022	MF	(Algeria) Youcef El Houari	Unattached	Released	
4 August 2022	MF	(Algeria) Miloud Rebiai	CR Belouizdad	Free transfer	
4 August 2022	MF	(Algeria) Abdelraouf Benguit	(Morocco) Raja CA	Free transfer	
16 August 2022	FW	(Algeria) Abdelhak Abdelhafid	CS Constantine	Free transfer	

==== Winter ====
Date	Pos	Player	To club	Transfer fee	Source
11 January 2023	FW	(Algeria) Idir Boutrif	Unattached	Released	
28 January 2023	FW	(Nigeria) Victor Mbaoma	Unattached	Released	
5 February 2023	FW	(Algeria) Mohammed Souhil Bassa	Unattached	Released	
7 March 2023	DF	(Algeria) Adel Ghanem	(Latvia) Valmiera FC	Loan for one year (Note: The amount of the loan is 100,000 euros and 150,000 euros in the event of a permanent transfer of the player.)	

=== New contracts ===
No.	Pos	Player	Contract length	Contract end	Date	Source
	FW	(Algeria) Mohamed Ramzi Haif	2 years	2026	25 June 2022	
	MF	(Algeria) Oualaa Moundhir Bouzekri	2 years	2026	25 June 2022	
	GK	(Algeria) Mohamed El Amine Yacoubi	2 years	2026	25 June 2022	
12	FW	(Algeria) Mohamed Merouani	2 years	2024	14 July 2022	

== Competitions ==
=== Overview ===
Competition	Record								Started round	Final position / round	First match	Last match
Competition	G	W	D	L	GF	GA	GD	Win %	Started round	Final position / round	First match	Last match
Ligue 1	30	12	11	7	21	20	+1	40.00	—N/a	3rd	27 August 2022	15 July 2023
Algerian Cup	1	0	0	1	0	2	−2	0.00	Round of 64	Round of 64	14 February 2023	14 February 2023
Total	31	11	11	9	21	22	−1	35.48				

Updated to match played 15 July 2023
Source: Competitions

=== Ligue 1 ===
==== League table ====
Pos	Team	Pld	W	D	L	GF	GA	GD	Pts	Qualification or relegation
1	CR Belouizdad (C)	30	18	10	2	44	21	+23	64	Qualification for CAF Champions League
2	CS Constantine	30	14	8	8	39	26	+13	50	Qualification for CAF Champions League
3	MC Alger	30	12	11	7	21	20	+1	47	
4	MC El Bayadh	30	13	7	10	34	25	+9	46	
5	JS Saoura	30	11	9	10	32	25	+7	42	

Updated to match(es) played on 15 July 2023. Source: the-sports.org
Rules for classification: 1) points; 2) head-to-head points; 3) head-to-head goal difference; 4) goal difference; 5) total goals; 6) fairplay ranking; 7) playoff.
(C) Champions

==== Results summary ====
Overall								Home						Away					
Pld	W	D	L	GF	GA	GD	Pts	W	D	L	GF	GA	GD	W	D	L	GF	GA	GD
30	12	11	7	21	20	+1	47	9	6	0	16	6	+10	3	5	7	5	14	−9

Last updated: 15 July 2023.
Source: Competitive matches

==== Results by round ====
Round	1	2	3	4	5	6	7	8	9	10	11	12	13	14	15	16	17	18	19	20	21	22	23	24	25	26	27	28	29	30
Ground	A	H	A	H	A	H	A	H	A	H	A	H	A	H	A	H	A	H	A	H	A	H	A	H	A	H	A	H	A	H
Result	L	D	D	W	D	W	W	W	L	W	W	D	L	W	L	D	D	W	W	D	D	D	L	W	L	D	L	W	D	W
Position	15	13	11	9	10	6	5	3	5	3	3	4	5	3	4	5	5	3	3	3	3	3	4	3	5	4	7	4	4	3

Updated to match(es) played on 15 July 2023. Source: Competitive matches
A = Away; H = Home; W = Win; D = Draw; L = Loss

==== Matches ====
The league fixtures were announced on 19 July 2022.

27 August 2022 Round 1	JS Saoura	2–0	MC Alger	Béchar
20:00	Mellal 43', 77' (pen.)	Report		Stadium: 20 August 1955 Stadium; Referee: Mustapha Ghorbal

3 September 2022 Round 2	MC Alger	0–0	US Biskra	Rouïba
16:45		Report		Stadium: Salem Mabrouki Stadium; Referee: Mohamed Lamine Benzohra

9 September 2022 Round 3	RC Arbaâ	0–0	MC Alger	Larbaâ
16:30		Report		Stadium: Ismaïl Makhlouf Stadium; Referee: Mehdi Abid Charef

16 September 2022 Round 4	MC Alger	2–1	NC Magra	Dar El Beïda
16:30	Tahar 83'; Hamidi 90+5'	Report	Berrabeh 70'	Stadium: Omar Benrabah Stadium; Referee: Mohamed Saidi

3 October 2022 Round 6	MC Alger	2–1	ASO Chlef	Dar El Beïda
15:30	Merzougui 18'; Debbih 55'	Report	Addadi 54' (pen.)	Stadium: Omar Benrabah Stadium; Referee: Abdelali Ibrir

8 October 2022 Round 7	CS Constantine	0–2	MC Alger	Constantine
15:00		Report	Merzougui 16', 19'	Stadium: Ramadane Ben Abdelmalek Stadium; Referee: Mustapha Ghorbal

21 October 2022 Round 9	USM Khenchela	2–0	MC Alger	Khenchela
15:00	Omoyele 5'; Bayazid 59'	Report		Stadium: Amar Hamam Stadium; Referee: Mohamed Amine Boutraa

6 November 2022 Round 10	MC Alger	1–0	JS Kabylie	Dar El Beïda
15:00	Hamoudi 31'	Report		Stadium: Omar Benrabah Stadium; Referee: Abdelmoumen Touabti

9 November 2022 Round 11	HB Chelghoum Laïd	0–1	MC Alger	Chelghoum Laïd
15:00		Report	Merzougui 90+3'	Stadium: 11 December 1961 Stadium; Referee: Ali Nader

29 November 2022 Round 12	MC Alger	2–2	Paradou AC	Dar El Beïda
15:00	Esso 64'; Bendouma 83' (o.g.)	Report	Abdellaoui 2' (o.g.); Aoued 31'	Stadium: Omar Benrabah Stadium; Referee: Mehdi Abid Charef

3 December 2022 Round 5	CR Belouizdad	0–0	MC Alger	Belouizdad
15:00		Report		Stadium: 20 August 1955 Stadium; Referee: Abdelali Ibrir

7 December 2022 Round 13	MC Oran	3–0	MC Alger	Oran
18:00	Benamar 27'; Naâmani 48'; Benayad 73'	Report		Stadium: Ahmed Zabana Stadium; Referee: Youcef Gamouh

11 December 2022 Round 14	MC Alger	1–0	ES Sétif	Dar El Beïda
15:00	Debbih 15'	Report		Stadium: Omar Benrabah Stadium; Referee: Mehadji Tayeb Bouderbali

20 December 2022 Round 8	MC Alger	1–0	USM Alger	Algiers
15:00	Benabdi 67'	Report		Stadium: Stade du 5 Juillet; Referee: Lotfi Bekouassa

24 December 2022 Round 15	MC El Bayadh	1–0	MC Alger	El Bayadh
14:30	Ghennam 9'	Report		Stadium: Zakaria Medjdoub Stadium; Referee: Abdelmoumen Touabti

10 February 2023 Round 16	MC Alger	1–1	JS Saoura	Algiers
16:00	Oukil 56'	Report	Akacem 15'	Stadium: Stade du 5 Juillet; Referee: Lahlou Benbraham

19 February 2023 Round 17	US Biskra	0–0	MC Alger	Biskra
18:00		Report		Stadium: 18 February Stadium; Referee: Abdelmoumen Touabti

25 February 2023 Round 18	MC Alger	2–0	RC Arbaâ	Dar El Beïda
15:00	Haroune 56', 86'	Report		Stadium: Omar Benrabah Stadium; Referee: Youcef Gamouh

31 March 2023 Round 21	ASO Chlef	0–0	MC Alger	Chlef
15:45		Report		Stadium: Mohamed Boumezrag Stadium; Referee: Abdellah Benchehida

7 April 2023 Round 22	MC Alger	0–0	CS Constantine	Algiers
22:30		Report		Stadium: Stade du 5 Juillet; Referee: Mohamed Bouteraa

11 April 2023 Round 19	NC Magra	0–1	MC Alger	Magra
15:00		Report	Ghezala 52'	Stadium: Boucheligue Brothers Stadium; Referee: Ali Nader

9 May 2023 Round 20	MC Alger	0–0	CR Belouizdad	Algiers
18:00		Report		Stadium: Stade du 5 Juillet; Referee: Houssam Benyahia

30 May 2023 Round 24	MC Alger	1–0	USM Khenchela	Dar El Beïda
16:00	Abdellaoui 23'	Report		Stadium: Omar Benrabah Stadium; Referee: Nabil Boukhalfa

6 June 2023 Round 25	JS Kabylie	2–0	MC Alger	Tizi Ouzou
16:30	Mouaki 8'; Redjem 45+2'	Report		Stadium: 1 November 1954 Stadium; Referee: Abdellah Benchehida

23 June 2023 Round 23	USM Alger	2–0	MC Alger	Baraki
18:00	Belkacemi 40'; Loucif 63'	Report		Stadium: Nelson Mandela Stadium; Referee: Houssem Benyahia

1 July 2023 Round 26	MC Alger	1–1	HB Chelghoum Laïd	Dar El Beïda
17:00	Haroune 45'	Report	Bouchelif 4'	Stadium: Omar Benrabah Stadium; Referee: Rafik Aouina

4 July 2023 Round 27	Paradou AC	1–0	MC Alger	Dar El Beïda
17:00	Zerrouki 29'	Report		Stadium: Omar Benrabah Stadium; Referee: Ali Nader

7 July 2023 Round 28	MC Alger	1–0	MC Oran	Dar El Beïda
17:15	Debbih 74'	Report		Stadium: Omar Benrabah Stadium; Referee: Mohamed Tahar Milia

10 July 2023 Round 29	ES Sétif	1–1	MC Alger	Sétif
17:15	Boucif 87'	Report	Bouzekri 37'	Stadium: 8 May 1945 Stadium; Referee: Abdelali Ibrir

15 July 2023 Round 30	MC Alger	1–0	MC El Bayadh	Dar El Beïda
17:15	Tahar 65' (pen.)	Report		Stadium: Omar Benrabah Stadium; Referee: Mohamed Amine Benzohra

=== Algerian Cup ===
14 February 2023 Round of 64	NC Magra	2–0	MC Alger	Magra
14:00	Salah 60'; Berrabeh 90'	Report		Stadium: Boucheligue Brothers Stadium; Referee: Mohamed Bouteraa
Note: Lineup for MC Alger - Litim, Hamidi (Dahmani, 38'), Merouani, Ghezala, Ferhani, Halaïmia, Touki, Hamoudi, Tahar, Oukil (Abdellaoui, 52'), Esso.

== Squad information ==
=== Playing statistics ===
No.	Pos	Nat	Player	Total		Ligue 1		Algerian Cup	
No.	Pos	Nat	Player	Apps	Goals	Apps	Goals	Apps	Goals
Goalkeepers
1	GK	(Algeria) ALG	Farid Chaâl	8	0	8	0	0	0
2	GK	(Algeria) ALG	Abdelatif Ramdane	0	0	0	0	0	0
16	GK	(Algeria) ALG	Oussama Litim	23	0	22	0	1	0
Defenders
3	DF	(Algeria) ALG	Boualem Mesmoudi	12	0	12	0	0	0
5	DF	(Algeria) ALG	Ayoub Abdellaoui	27	1	26	1	1	0
12	DF	(Algeria) ALG	Mohamed Merouani	12	0	11	0	1	0
14	DF	(Algeria) ALG	Hamza Mouali	6	0	6	0	0	0
15	DF	(Algeria) ALG	Houari Ferhani	18	0	17	0	1	0
17	DF	(Algeria) ALG	Kamel Hamidi	28	1	27	1	1	0
19	DF	(Algeria) ALG	Ayoub Ghezala	24	1	23	1	1	0
20	DF	(Algeria) ALG	Réda Halaïmia	27	0	26	0	1	0
31	DF	(Algeria) ALG	Abdelkader Menezla	7	0	7	0	0	0
Midfielders
4	MF	(Algeria) ALG	Tayeb Hamoudi	20	1	19	1	1	0
6	MF	(Algeria) ALG	Mohamed Benkhemassa	8	0	8	0	0	0
13	MF	(Algeria) ALG	Aziz Benabdi	20	1	20	1	0	0
22	MF	(Algeria) ALG	Khalid Dahmani	18	0	17	0	1	0
25	MF	(Algeria) ALG	Badreddine Touki	21	0	20	0	1	0
26	MF	(Algeria) ALG	Moundhir Bouzekri	16	1	16	1	0	0
81	MF	(Algeria) ALG	Aimed Bennara	9	0	9	0	0	0
Forwards
7	FW	(Algeria) ALG	Abdelmalek Oukil	20	1	19	1	1	0
8	FW	(Algeria) ALG	Féth-Allah Tahar	27	2	26	2	1	0
9	FW	(Algeria) ALG	Ali Haroun	15	3	15	3	0	0
10	FW	(Ghana) GHA	Joseph Esso	15	1	14	1	1	0
11	FW	(Madagascar) MAD	Razafindranaivo Koloina	7	0	7	0	0	0
18	FW	(Algeria) ALG	Kheireddine Merzougui	14	4	14	4	0	0
21	FW	(Algeria) ALG	Aymene Rahmani	2	0	2	0	0	0
24	FW	(Algeria) ALG	Mohamed Ramzi Haif	8	0	8	0	0	0
41	FW	(Algeria) ALG	Mehdi Boucherit	8	0	8	0	0	0
57	FW	(Algeria) ALG	Anis Bakhouche	8	0	8	0	0	0
Players transferred out during the season
9	FW	(Nigeria) NGR	Victor Mbaoma	6	0	6	0	0	0
11	FW	(Algeria) ALG	Mohammed Souhil Bassa	0	0	0	0	0	0
27	FW	(Algeria) ALG	Idir Boutrif	1	0	1	0	0	0

Last updated: 15 July 2023
Source: soccerway.com

=== Goalscorers ===
As of 15 July 2023

Includes all competitive matches. The list is sorted alphabetically by surname when total goals are equal.

No.	Nat.	Player	Pos.	L 1	AC	TOTAL
18	(Algeria)	Kheireddine Merzougui	FW	4	0	4
9	(Algeria)	Ali Haroun	FW	3	0	3
23	(Algeria)	Chouaib Debbih	FW	3	0	3
8	(Algeria)	Féth-Allah Tahar	FW	2	0	2
17	(Algeria)	Kamel Hamidi	DF	1	0	1
4	(Algeria)	Tayeb Hamoudi	MF	1	0	1
10	(Algeria)	Joseph Esso	FW	1	0	1
13	(Algeria)	Aziz Benabdi	MF	1	0	1
7	(Algeria)	Abdelmalek Oukil	FW	1	0	1
19	(Algeria)	Ayoub Ghezala	DF	1	0	1
5	(Algeria)	Ayoub Abdellaoui	DF	1	0	1
26	(Algeria)	Moundhir Bouzekri	MF	1	0	1
Own Goals				1	0	1
Totals				21	0	21
