= 2023–24 US Souf season =

US Souf
2023–24 season
- President: Youcef Sakhri
- Head coach: Omar Belatoui (from 31 July 2023) (until 26 November 2023); Samir Chibane (from 4 January 2024)
- Stadium: 1 November 1954 Stadium
- Ligue 1: 16th (relegated)
- Algerian Cup: Round of 64
- Top goalscorer: League: Djilani Hadj Saad (9 goals); All: Djilani Hadj Saad (9 goals)
- Biggest win: US Souf 2–0 US Biskra
- Biggest defeat: JS Saoura 6–0 US Souf; Paradou AC 6–0 US Souf
Home colours	Away colours

The 2023–24 season, is US Souf's first ever season in the top flight of Algerian football. In addition to the domestic league, US Souf are participating in the Algerian Cup.

== Squad list ==
Players and squad numbers last updated on 5 February 2024.
Note: Flags indicate national team as has been defined under FIFA eligibility rules. Players may hold more than one non-FIFA nationality.

No.	Nat.	Position	Name	Date of Birth (Age)	Signed from
Goalkeepers
1	(Algeria)	GK	Yassine Dahmani	27 August 1995 (aged 28)	(Algeria) JSM Tiaret
23	(Algeria)	GK	Soufiane Halassa	10 September 1993 (aged 30)	(Algeria)
Defenders
2	(Algeria)	RB	Aymen Chaaraoui	26 July 1997 (aged 26)	(Algeria) RC Arbaâ
3	(Algeria)	LB	Fayssal Mekraz	5 June 1997 (aged 26)	(Algeria) AS Khroub
5	(Algeria)	CB	Hichem Lalaouna	18 May 1995 (aged 28)	(Algeria) HB Chelghoum Laïd
13	(Algeria)	CB	Mohamed Hammouche	21 April 1995 (aged 28)	(Saudi Arabia) Al Selmiyah
14	(Algeria)	RB	Aziz Bellakhdar	5 June 1999 (aged 24)	(Algeria) USM El Harrach
20	(Algeria)	CB	Abdesamia Belghamri	10 January 1997 (aged 26)	(Algeria)
21	(Algeria)	LB	Yacine Benamara	28 November 1999 (aged 23)	(Algeria)
22	(Algeria)	CB	Youcef Belamine	24 July 1997 (aged 26)	(Algeria)
44	(Algeria)	CB	Fouad Rahmani	3 January 2002 (aged 21)	(Algeria) USM Alger
Midfielders
10	(Algeria)	MF	Aboubakr Kessili	26 December 1996 (aged 26)	(Algeria) RC Arbaâ
26	(Algeria)	MF	Nacer Hadj Saad	1 January 1996 (aged 27)	
Forwards
7	(Algeria)	FW	Ramzi Haif	25 June 2001 (aged 22)	(Algeria) MC Alger
8	(Algeria)	FW	Mohamed Amine Hamia	5 October 1989 (aged 34)	(Saudi Arabia) Al-Sharq
9	(Libya)	FW	Mohammed Al-Ghunaymi	13 January 1998 (aged 25)	(Iraq) Zakho SC
11	(Algeria)	FW	Islam Eddine Kaidi	3 August 2000 (aged 23)	(Algeria) JS Saoura
17	(Algeria)	FW	Aymene Rahmani	16 May 2001 (aged 22)	(Algeria) CR Belouizdad
19	(Algeria)	FW	Djilani Hadj Saad	24 September 1984 (aged 38)	(Algeria) HB Chelghoum Laïd
24	(Algeria)	FW	Abdelkrim Benarous	2 June 1997 (aged 26)	(Algeria) USM El Harrach
39	(Algeria)	FW	Mohamed Belkhadem	25 January 2002 (aged 21)	(Algeria) CR Belouizdad

== Transfers ==
=== In ===
==== Summer ====
Date	Pos	Player	Moving from	Fee	Source
9 August 2023	GK	(Algeria) Yassine Dahmani	JSM Tiaret	Free transfer	
9 August 2023	MF	(Algeria) Adel Djerrar	(Libya) Al-Nasr	Free transfer	
14 August 2023	DF	(Algeria) Aymen Chaaraoui	RC Arbaâ	Free transfer	
17 August 2023	MF	(Algeria) Aboubakr Kessili	RC Arbaâ	Free transfer	
17 August 2023	GK	(Algeria) Abdelhamid Brahimi	USM Khenchela	Free transfer	
20 August 2023	FW	(Algeria) Islam Eddine Kaidi	JS Saoura	Free transfer	
27 August 2023	FW	(Algeria) Ramzi Haif	MC Alger	Free transfer	
6 September 2023	DF	(Algeria) Ibrahim Bekakchi	USM Alger	Free transfer	
6 September 2023	FW	(Algeria) Ibrahim Morsli	MC Alger	Free transfer	
10 September 2023	FW	(Algeria) Mohamed Belkhadem	CR Belouizdad	Loan	
10 September 2023	FW	(Algeria) Aymene Rahmani	CR Belouizdad	Loan	

=== Out ===
==== Winter ====
Date	Pos	Player	Moving from	Fee	Source
25 January 2024	MF	(Algeria) Adel Djerrar	NA Hussein Dey	Free transfer	
5 February 2024	MF	(Algeria) Abdelhamid Brahimi	GC Mascara	Free transfer	
5 February 2024	DF	(Algeria) Ibrahim Bekakchi	NC Magra	Free transfer	
5 February 2024	MF	(Algeria) Islam Siab	USM Annaba	Free transfer	
5 February 2024	FW	(Algeria) Ibrahim Morsli	MC El Bayadh	Free transfer	

=== New contracts ===
No.	Pos	Player	Contract length	Contract end	Date	Source
21	CB	Yacine Benamara	2 years	2026	21 August 2023	

== Competitions ==
=== Overview ===
Competition	Record								Started round	Final position / round	First match	Last match
Competition	G	W	D	L	GF	GA	GD	Win %	Started round	Final position / round	First match	Last match
Ligue 1	30	2	1	27	22	86	−64	6.67	—N/a	16th	23 September 2023	14 June 2024
Algerian Cup	1	0	0	1	1	3	−2	0.00	Round of 64	Round of 64	2 February 2024	2 February 2024
Total	31	2	1	28	23	89	−66	6.45				

Updated to match played 14 June 2024
Source: Competitions

=== Ligue 1 ===
==== League table ====
Pos	Team	Pld	W	D	L	GF	GA	GD	Pts	Qualification or relegation
12	NC Magra	30	9	11	10	30	32	−2	38	
13	MC Oran	30	9	9	12	26	33	−7	36	
14	US Biskra	30	9	9	12	25	34	−9	36	
15	ES Ben Aknoun (R)	30	8	8	14	32	37	−5	32 (Note: ES Ben Aknoun awarded 3–0 win against US Souf.)	Relegation to Algerian Ligue 2
16	US Souf (R)	30	2	1	27	22	86	−64	7 (Note: US Souf lost 3–0 win against ES Ben Aknoun by penalty.)	Relegation to Algerian Ligue 2

Source: the-sports.org
Rules for classification: 1) points; 2) head-to-head points; 3) head-to-head goal difference; 4) goal difference; 5) total goals; 6) fairplay ranking; 7) playoff.
(R) Relegated

==== Results summary ====
Overall								Home						Away					
Pld	W	D	L	GF	GA	GD	Pts	W	D	L	GF	GA	GD	W	D	L	GF	GA	GD
30	2	1	27	22	86	−64	7	1	1	13	17	43	−26	1	0	14	5	43	−38

Last updated: 14 June 2024.
Source: Competitive matches

==== Results by round ====
Round	1	2	3	4	5	6	7	8	9	10	11	12	13	14	15	16	17	18	19	20	21	22	23	24	25	26	27	28	29	30
Ground	H	A	H	A	H	A	H	A	H	H	A	H	A	H	A	A	H	A	H	A	H	A	H	A	A	H	A	H	A	H
Result	L	L	D	W	L	L	L	L	L	L	L	L	L	L	L	L	W	L	L	L	L	L	L	L	L	L	L	L	L	L
Position	15	16	16	12	14	15	15	15	15	15	16	16	16	16	16	16	16	16	16	16	16	16	16	16	16	16	16	16	16	16

Updated to match(es) played on 14 June 2024. Source: Competitive matches
A = Away; H = Home; W = Win; D = Draw; L = Loss

==== Matches ====
The league fixtures were announced on 24 August 2023.

All times are local, WAT (UTC+1).

Win Draw Loss Postponed

23 September 2023 Round 2	US Biskra	3–1	US Souf	Biskra
19:00	Rahmoun 10'; Baâli 12'; Zeghnoun 32'	Report	Bassou 13'	Stadium: 18 February Stadium; Referee: Akram Mechairia

29 September 2023 Round 3	US Souf	0–0	MC Oran	El Oued
15:45		Report		Stadium: 1 November 1954 Stadium; Referee: Mohamed Belkebir

7 October 2023 Round 4	ES Ben Aknoun	0–1	US Souf	Dar El Beïda
15:45		Report	Al-Ghunaymi 36' (pen.)	Stadium: Omar Benrabah Stadium; Referee: Youcef Gamouh

13 October 2023 Round 1	US Souf	0–3	CR Belouizdad	El Oued
15:30		Report	Meziane 16'; Boussouf 43'; Benguit 45+1'	Stadium: 1 November 1954 Stadium; Referee: Abdelali Ibrir

10 November 2023 Round 5	US Souf	3–4	CS Constantine	El Oued
15:30	Bassou 45+4'; Rahmani 51'; Lalaouna 61'	Report	Benchaâ 15'; Dib 56' (pen.), 74'; Temine 89'	Stadium: 1 November 1954 Stadium; Referee: Youcef Tayeb Bouderbal

17 November 2023 Round 6	MC El Bayadh	4–0	US Souf	El Bayadh
15:30	Belmiloud 11', 49'; Berriah 81'; Belaribi 83'	Report		Stadium: Zakaria Medjdoub Stadium; Referee: Mohamed Saidi

25 November 2023 Round 7	US Souf	3–4	MC Alger	El Oued
15:15	Bassou 36'; Benlamri 70' (o.g.); Belamine 90'	Report	Belaïli 8', 33', 73' (pen.); Naidji 31'	Stadium: 1 November 1954 Stadium; Referee: Rafik Aouina

2 December 2023 Round 8	ASO Chlef	2–0	US Souf	Chlef
16:45	Addadi 29' (pen.); Mohutsiwa 53'	Report		Stadium: Mohamed Boumezrag Stadium; Referee: Alaa Bouab

9 December 2023 Round 9	US Souf	0–1	JS Saoura	El Oued
15:00		Report	Bellatreche 85'	Stadium: 1 November 1954 Stadium; Referee: Nabil Boukhalfa

16 December 2023 Round 10	US Souf	1–3	ES Sétif	El Oued
15:00	Bassou 31'	Report	Chacha 8' (o.g.); Zeghad 73'; Bouchoucha 90'	Stadium: 1 November 1954 Stadium; Referee: Youcef Gamouh

29 December 2023 Round 11	NC Magra	1–0	US Souf	Magra
15:15	Demane 64' (pen.)	Report		Stadium: Boucheligue Brothers Stadium; Referee: Billel Soltani

5 January 2024 Round 12	US Souf	1–4	Paradou AC	El Oued
15:15	Siab 51' (pen.)	Report	Titraoui 14'; Tahar 24'; Boulbina 64'; Ramdaoui 68'	Stadium: 1 November 1954 Stadium; Referee: Abderrahmane Sahraoui

13 January 2024 Round 13	USM Khenchela	2–0	US Souf	Khenchela
15:00	Sabouni 73'; Baakoh 78'	Report		Stadium: Amar Hamam Stadium; Referee: Anes Azrine

19 January 2024 Round 14	US Souf	1–3	USM Alger	El Oued
15:30	Hadj Saad 14'	Report	Bouziane 26'; Belamine 76' (o.g.); Kanou 90+4'	Stadium: 1 November 1954 Stadium; Attendance: 0 (close doors); Referee: Ayoub Belhachemi

27 January 2024 Round 15	JS Kabylie	3–2	US Souf	Tizi Ouzou
16:00	Boualia 35', 38'; Redjem 44'	Report	Belkhadem 14'; Rahmani 49'	Stadium: 1 November 1954 Stadium; Referee: Lyes Bekouassa

10 February 2024 Round 16	CR Belouizdad	2–0	US Souf	Algiers
18:00	Wamba 45+2' (pen.), 52'	Report		Stadium: Stade du 5 Juillet

17 February 2024 Round 17	US Souf	2–0	US Biskra	El Oued
15:30	Hadj Saad 34', 51'	Report		Stadium: 1 November 1954 Stadium; Referee: Youcef Taieb Bouderbal

24 February 2024 Round 18	MC Oran	2–1	US Souf	Oran
16:45	Boussalem 51'; Naâmani 90+3'	Report	Hadj Saad 40'	Stadium: Ahmed Zabana Stadium; Referee: Redouane Allou

2 March 2024 Round 19	US Souf	0–3	ES Ben Aknoun	El Oued
16:00		Report		Stadium: 1 November 1954 Stadium; Referee: Abdelali Ibrir
Note: ES Ben Aknoun awarded 3–0 win against US Souf.

15 March 2024 Round 20	CS Constantine	3–0	US Souf	Constantine
22:00	Khaldi 22'; Belhocini 38'; Chekal 85'	Report		Stadium: Chahid Hamlaoui Stadium; Referee: Tahar Boudjemaa

23 March 2024 Round 21	US Souf	4–5	MC El Bayadh	El Oued
15:30	Hadj Saad 51', 80', 83'; Belkhadem 71'	Report	Lalaouna 1' (o.g.); Messadi 22', 43'; Sediri 25'; Belmiloud 40'	Stadium: 1 November 1954 Stadium; Referee: Anes Azrine

5 April 2024 Round 22	MC Alger	3–0	US Souf	Algiers
22:00	Merzougui 45+3'; Zougrana 67'; Ouattara 86'	Report		Stadium: Stade du 5 Juillet; Referee: Abderahmane Sahraoui

19 April 2024 Round 23	US Souf	0–2	ASO Chlef	El Oued
16:00		Report	Agbagno 37'; Bounoua 84'	Stadium: 1 November 1954 Stadium; Referee: Haithem Ghouti

26 April 2024 Round 24	JS Saoura	6–0	US Souf	Béchar
16:00	Saâdi 9', 43'; Amrane 24'; Souibaâh 51'; Haddadou 78'; Amieur 86'	Report		Stadium: 20 August 1955 Stadium; Referee: Mohamed Beloufa

10 May 2024 Round 25	ES Sétif	3–0	US Souf	Sétif
18:00	Zamoum 25'; Lahmeri 33'; Guettaf 44'	Report		Stadium: 8 May 1945 Stadium; Referee: Mohamed Belkebir

17 May 2024 Round 26	US Souf	0–2	NC Magra	El Oued
17:00		Report	Demane 90'; Boughanem 81'	Stadium: 1 November 1954 Stadium; Referee: Fateh Harkat

26 May 2024 Round 27	Paradou AC	6–0	US Souf	Dar El Beïda
16:45	Boulbina 20', 41', 68'; Hamidi 27'; Bouzahzah 49'; Belghamri 54' (o.g.)	Report		Stadium: Omar Benrabah Stadium; Referee: Tayeb Benyabka

7 June 2024 Round 28	US Souf	2–5	USM Khenchela	El Oued
16:45	Hadj Saad 52', 80'	Report	Omoyele 1', 67', 69'; Sabouni 18'; Debbih 40'	Stadium: 1 November 1954 Stadium; Referee: Djameleddine Zenati

11 June 2024 Round 29	USM Alger	3–0	US Souf	Blida
16:45	Belkacemi 1', 12', 89'	Report		Stadium: Mustapha Tchaker Stadium; Referee: Zouhir Maansri

14 June 2024 Round 30	US Souf	0–4	JS Kabylie	El Oued
16:45		Report	Mouaki 45+2'; Souyad 56'; Berkane 88', 90+2'	Stadium: 1 November 1954 Stadium; Referee: Mohamed Belkebir

=== Algerian Cup ===
2 February 2024 Round of 64	US Souf	1–3	ES Ben Aknoun	El Oued
14:30	Chacha 89'	Report	Hadji 44', 86' (pen.); Atif 62'	Stadium: 1 November 1954 Stadium; Referee: Mehadji Tayeb Bouderbal
Note: US Souf Lineups: Halassa, Rahmani, Belghamri, Mekraz, Benamara, Siab, Chacha, Moumen Bekkouche, Rahmani, Belkhadem, Bassou. (Kessili (substituted on) ) (Hadj Saad N (substituted on) )

== Squad information ==
=== Playing statistics ===
No.	Pos	Nat	Player	Total		Ligue 1		Algerian Cup	
No.	Pos	Nat	Player	Apps	Goals	Apps	Goals	Apps	Goals
Goalkeepers
1	GK	(Algeria) ALG	Yassine Dahmani	7	0	7	0	0	0
23	GK	(Algeria) ALG	Soufiane Halassa	20	0	19	0	1	0
30	GK	(Algeria) ALG	Aimene Zaidane	0	0	0	0	0	0
Defenders
2	DF	(Algeria) ALG	Aymen Chaaraoui	21	0	21	0	0	0
3	DF	(Algeria) ALG	Fayssal Mekraz	9	0	8	0	1	0
5	DF	(Algeria) ALG	Hichem Lalaouna	20	1	20	1	0	0
13	DF	(Algeria) ALG	Mohamed Hammouche	8	0	8	0	0	0
14	DF	(Algeria) ALG	Aziz Bellakhdar	4	0	4	0	0	0
20	DF	(Algeria) ALG	Abdesamia Belghamri	22	0	22	0	0	0
21	DF	(Algeria) ALG	Yacine Benamara	23	0	22	0	1	0
22	DF	(Algeria) ALG	Youcef Belamine	17	1	17	1	0	0
44	DF	(Algeria) ALG	Fouad Rahmani	20	1	19	1	1	0
Midfielders
10	MF	(Algeria) ALG	Aboubakr Kessili	2	0	1	0	1	0
26	MF	(Algeria) ALG	Nacer Hadj Saad	20	0	19	0	1	0
31	MF	(Algeria) ALG	Mohamed Moumen Bekkouche	6	0	6	0	0	0
36	MF	(Algeria) ALG	Mohamed Chahcha	22	1	21	0	1	1
58	MF	(Algeria) ALG	Mohammed Telib	1	0	1	0	0	0
65	MF	(Algeria) ALG	Mohammed Redouani	2	0	2	0	0	0
Forwards
7	FW	(Algeria) ALG	Ramzi Haif	15	0	15	0	0	0
8	FW	(Algeria) ALG	Mohamed Amine Hamia	4	0	4	0	0	0
9	FW	(Libya) LBA	Mohammed Al-Ghunaymi	11	1	11	1	0	0
11	FW	(Algeria) ALG	Islam Eddine Kaidi	7	0	7	0	0	0
17	FW	(Algeria) ALG	Aymene Rahmani	11	1	10	1	1	0
19	FW	(Algeria) ALG	Djilani Hadj Saad	22	9	22	9	0	0
24	FW	(Algeria) ALG	Abdelkrim Benarous	14	0	14	0	0	0
31	FW	(Algeria) ALG	Mohamed Moumen Bekkouche	12	0	12	0	0	0
39	FW	(Algeria) ALG	Mohamed Belkhadem	8	2	7	2	1	0
43	FW	(Algeria) ALG	Mohamed Khedime	18	0	17	0	1	0
79	FW	(Algeria) ALG	Abdelmoundji Bassou	15	4	14	4	1	0
Players transferred out during the season
16	GK	(Algeria) ALG	Abdelhamid Brahimi	0	0	0	0	0	0
	DF	(Algeria) ALG	Ibrahim Bekakchi	0	0	0	0	0	0
15	MF	(Algeria) ALG	Islam Siab	12	1	11	1	1	0
8	MF	(Algeria) ALG	Adel Djerrar	3	0	3	0	0	0
	MF	(Algeria) ALG	Hamza Yadroudj	0	0	0	0	0	0
	FW	(Algeria) ALG	Ibrahim Morsli	0	0	0	0	0	0

Last updated: 14 June 2024
Source: soccerway.com

=== Goalscorers ===
As of 14 June 2024

Includes all competitive matches. The list is sorted alphabetically by surname when total goals are equal.

No.	Nat.	Player	Pos.	L 1	AC	TOTAL
19	(Algeria)	Djilani Hadj Saad	FW	9	0	9
79	(Algeria)	Abdelmoundji Bassou	FW	4	0	4
39	(Algeria)	Mohamed Belkhadem	FW	2	0	2
9	(Libya)	Mohammed Al-Ghunaymi	FW	1	0	1
44	(Algeria)	Fouad Rahmani	DF	1	0	1
5	(Algeria)	Hichem Lalaouna	DF	1	0	1
22	(Algeria)	Youcef Belamine	DF	1	0	1
15	(Algeria)	Islam Siab	MF	1	0	1
17	(Algeria)	Aymene Rahmani	FW	1	0	1
36	(Algeria)	Mohamed Chacha	MF	0	1	1
Own Goals				1	0	1
Totals				22	1	23
