= 2017–18 JS Saoura season =

JS Saoura
2017–18 season
- Owner: Entreprise Nationale de Forage
- President: Mohamed Zerouati
- Head coach: Fouad Bouali (from July 2017} (until January 2018} Karim Khouda (from January 2018} (until March 2018} Nabil Neghiz (from 8 March 2018)
- Stadium: Stade 20 Août 1955
- Ligue 1: Runners–up
- Algerian Cup: Quarter-final
- Top goalscorer: League: Moustapha Djallit (12); All: Moustapha Djallit (12); Sid Ali Yahia-Chérif (12)

In the 2017–18 season, JS Saoura competed in the Ligue 1 for the 6th season, as well as the Algerian Cup.

== Squad list ==
Players and squad numbers last updated on 18 November 2010.
Note: Flags indicate national team as has been defined under FIFA eligibility rules. Players may hold more than one non-FIFA nationality.

No.	Nat.	Position	Name	Date of Birth (Age)	Signed from
Goalkeepers
Defenders
Midfielders
Forwards

== Competitions ==
=== Overview ===
Competition	Record								Started round	Final position / round	First match	Last match
Competition	G	W	D	L	GF	GA	GD	Win %	Started round	Final position / round	First match	Last match
Ligue 1	30	16	6	8	38	27	+11	53.33	—N/a	Runners–up	26 August 2017	19 May 2018
Algerian Cup	4	3	0	1	5	3	+2	75.00	Round of 64	Quarter-final	30 December 2017	3 March 2018
Total	34	19	6	9	43	30	+13	55.88				

Updated to match played 19 May 2018
Source: Competitions

== League table ==
Pos	Team	Pld	W	D	L	GF	GA	GD	Pts	Qualification or relegation
1	CS Constantine (C)	30	16	9	5	36	26	+10	57	Qualification for the 2018–19 Champions League
2	JS Saoura	30	16	6	8	38	27	+11	54	Qualification for the 2018–19 Champions League
3	NA Hussein Dey	30	11	16	3	36	24	+12	49	Qualification for the 2018–19 Confederation Cup
4	MC Oran	30	12	9	9	40	37	+3	45	
5	MC Alger	30	12	8	10	41	32	+9	44	Qualification for 2018–19 Arab Club Champions Cup

Updated to match(es) played on 19 May 2018. Source: DZFoot
Rules for classification: 1) points; 2) head-to-head points; 3) head-to-head goal difference; 4) goal difference; 5) total goals; 6) fairplay ranking; 7) playoff.
(C) Champions

=== Results summary ===
Overall								Home						Away					
Pld	W	D	L	GF	GA	GD	Pts	W	D	L	GF	GA	GD	W	D	L	GF	GA	GD
30	16	6	8	38	27	+11	54	12	3	0	24	6	+18	4	3	8	14	21	−7

Last updated: 19 May 2018.
Source: Competitive matches

=== Results by round ===
Round	1	2	3	4	5	6	7	8	9	10	11	12	13	14	15	16	17	18	19	20	21	22	23	24	25	26	27	28	29	30
Ground	A	H	H	A	H	A	H	A	H	A	H	A	H	A	H	H	A	A	H	A	H	A	H	A	H	A	H	A	H	A
Result	D	W	W	L	W	D	W	L	W	L	W	W	W	L	D	W	L	L	D	L	D	D	W	L	W	W	W	W	W	W
Position	7	2	2	5	3	5	3	4	3	3	3	2	2	2	2	2	2	3	3	6	6	7	5	7	6	4	3	3	2	2

Updated to match(es) played on 19 May 2018. Source: Competitive matches
A = Away; H = Home; W = Win; D = Draw; L = Loss

=== Matches ===
Win Draw Loss

26 August 2017 Round 1	JS Kabylie	1–1	JS Saoura	Tizi Ouzou
19:00	Djabout 36' (pen.)	Soccerway report Live TV: None	22' Yahia-Chérif	Stadium: November 1, 1954 Stadium; Referee: Lahlou Benbraham

9 September 2017 Round 2	JS Saoura	2–0	US Biskra	Béchar
20:45	Djemaouni 17' (pen.); Bourdim 74'	Soccerway report Live TV: Algérie 3		Stadium: Stade 20 Août 1955; Referee: Amine Hansal

15 September 2017 Round 3	JS Saoura	2–0	USM Blida	Béchar
20:00	Yahia-Chérif 39'; Laïfaoui 58' (o.g.)	Soccerway report Live TV: None		Stadium: Stade 20 Août 1955; Referee: Mustapha Bessiri

23 September 2017 Round 4	ES Sétif	2–0	JS Saoura	Sétif
17:00	Djabou 28'; Amokrane 44'	Soccerway report Live TV: Algérie 3 / Canal Algérie		Stadium: Stade 8 Mai 1945; Referee: Mohamed Saïdi

29 September 2017 Round 5	JS Saoura	2–0	Paradou AC	Béchar
19:00	Djallit 30'; Yahia-Chérif 55'	Soccerway report Live TV: None		Stadium: Stade 20 Août 1955; Referee: Missoum Benabdellah

13 October 2017 Round 6	CR Belouizdad	1–1	JS Saoura	Belouizdad
16:00	Aichi 18'	Soccerway report Live TV: EPTV Terrestre / Algérie 3	22' Djallit	Stadium: Stade 20 Août 1955; Referee: Said Aouina

17 October 2017 Round 7	JS Saoura	1–0	NA Hussein Dey	Béchar
19:00	Djallit 10'	Soccerway report Live TV: None		Stadium: Stade 20 Août 1955; Referee: Merzoug Brahimi

21 October 2017 Round 8	Olympique de Médéa	2–0	JS Saoura	Médéa
16:00	Bahi 36', 54'	Soccerway report Live TV: None		Stadium: Stade Imam Lyes de Médéa; Referee: Abderrezzak Arab

28 October 2017 Round 9	JS Saoura	4–2	DRB Tadjenanet	Béchar
18:00	Djallit 8' (pen.), 28' (pen.), 51'; Bourdim 84'	Soccerway report Live TV: None	3' Demane; 90' (o.g.) Madani	Stadium: Stade 20 Août 1955; Referee: Mustapha Ghorbal

4 November 2017 Round 10	CS Constantine	4–2	JS Saoura	Constantine
16:00	Abid 15', 21'; Madani 23' (o.g.); Lamri 29'	Soccerway report Live TV: Algérie 3	52' Saâd; 76' Yahia-Chérif	Stadium: Stade Mohamed Hamlaoui; Referee: Lotfi Bekouassa

11 November 2017 Round 11	JS Saoura	1–0	USM Bel-Abbès	Béchar
18:00	Djallit 30'	Soccerway report Live TV: None		Stadium: Stade 20 Août 1955; Referee: Mohamed Saïdi

16 November 2017 Round 12	USM Alger	0–2	JS Saoura	Bologhine
17:00		Soccerway report Live TV: None	45' Bekakchi; 90+3' Yahia-Chérif	Stadium: Omar Hamadi Stadium; Attendance: 0 (close doors); Referee: Said Aouina

1 December 2017 Round 13	JS Saoura	1–0	USM El Harrach	Béchar
18:00	Djallit 61'	Soccerway report Live TV: None		Stadium: Stade 20 Août 1955; Referee: Amine Hansal

8 December 2017 Round 14	MC Oran	1–0	JS Saoura	Oran
16:00	Saïd 25'	Soccerway report Live TV: EPTV Terrestre / Algérie 3		Stadium: Ahmed Zabana Stadium; Referee: Lyés Bekouassa

15 December 2017 Round 15	JS Saoura	1–1	MC Alger	Béchar
18:00	Hammia 14'	Soccerway report Live TV: None	64' El Moudene	Stadium: Stade 20 Août 1955; Referee: Rafik Achouri

5 January 2018 Round 16	JS Saoura	2–0	JS Kabylie	Béchar
18:00	Djallit 61', 81'	Soccerway report Live TV: None		Stadium: Stade 20 Août 1955; Referee: Abderrezzak Arab

19 January 2018 Round 17	US Biskra	1–0	JS Saoura	Biskra
15:00	Kangou 20'	Soccerway report Live TV: None		Stadium: El Alia Sports Complex; Referee: Ahmed Bouzrar

26 January 2018 Round 18	USM Blida	1–0	JS Saoura	Blida
15:00	Frioui 90+1'	Soccerway report Live TV: None		Stadium: Brakni Brothers Stadium; Referee: Merzoug Brahimi

6 February 2018 Round 19	JS Saoura	0–0	ES Sétif	Béchar
17:00		Soccerway report Live TV: None		Stadium: Stade 20 Août 1955; Referee: Mustapha Bessiri

17 February 2018 Round 20	Paradou AC	3–0	JS Saoura	Bologhine
16:00	Naidji 47'; El Mellali 83', 86'	Soccerway report Live TV: Algérie 3		Stadium: Omar Hamadi Stadium; Referee: Mustapha Ghorbal

24 February 2018 Round 21	JS Saoura	1–1	CR Belouizdad	Béchar
16:00	Hammia 25'	Soccerway report Live TV: None	37' Draoui	Stadium: Stade 20 Août 1955; Referee: Oukil

10 March 2018 Round 22	NA Hussein Dey	0–0	JS Saoura	Belouizdad
16:00		Soccerway report Live TV: Algérie 3 / Canal Algérie		Stadium: Stade 20 Août 1955; Referee: Abderrezzak Arab

17 March 2018 Round 23	JS Saoura	2–0	Olympique de Médéa	Béchar
17:00	Yahia-Chérif 24'; Djallit 32' (pen.)	Soccerway report Live TV: None		Stadium: Stade 20 Août 1955; Referee: Redouane Necib

30 March 2018 Round 24	DRB Tadjenanet	2–0	JS Saoura	Tadjenanet
16:00	Dousse 26'; Demane 90+1'	Soccerway report Live TV: None		Stadium: Lahoua Smaïl Stadium; Referee: Abderrazek Hallalchi

6 April 2018 Round 25	JS Saoura	1–0	CS Constantine	Béchar
16:00	Bourdim 71' (pen.)	Soccerway report Live TV: EPTV Terrestre / Canal Algérie		Stadium: Stade 20 Août 1955; Referee: Merzoug Brahimi

20 April 2018 Round 26	USM Bel-Abbès	0–1	JS Saoura	Sidi Bel Abbès
16:00		Soccerway report Live TV: EPTV Terrestre	85' (pen.) Yahia-Chérif	Stadium: Stade 24 Fevrier 1956; Referee: Farouk Mial

24 April 2018 Round 27	JS Saoura	3–2	USM Alger	Béchar
16:00	Bourdim 21', 81' (pen.); Cherifi 53' (o.g.)	Soccerway report Live TV: None	58' (o.g.) Konaté; 90+1' (pen.) Benmoussa	Stadium: Stade 20 Août 1955; Attendance: 0 (close doors); Referee: Mohamed Saïdi

4 May 2018 Round 28	USM El Harrach	2–3	JS Saoura	Algiers
16:00	Belarbi 32'; Mazari 68'	Soccerway report Live TV: None	19' Bekakchi; 24' (pen.) Djallit; 85' (pen.) Bourdim	Stadium: Stade 1er Novembre 1954; Attendance: 0 (close doors); Referee: Said Aouina

12 May 2018 Round 29	JS Saoura	1–0	MC Oran	Béchar
16:00	Bourdim 90' (pen.)	Soccerway report Live TV: None		Stadium: Stade 20 Août 1955; Referee: Amine Sekhraoui

19 May 2018 Round 30	MC Alger	1–4	JS Saoura	Algiers
16:00	Bendebka 24'	Soccerway report Live TV: None	26', 61', 83' Yahia-Chérif; 64' Bourdim	Stadium: July 5, 1962 Stadium; Attendance: 0 (close doors); Referee: Merzoug Brahimi

== Algerian Cup ==
30 December 2017 Round of 64	SA Mohammadia	1–2	JS Saoura	Sidi Bel Abbès
14:00	Yachdir Faycal 88' (pen.)	Report; Live TV: None	42' Bourdim; 66' Zaidi	Stadium: Stade 24 Fevrier 1956; Referee: Abderrazek Hallalchi

15 January 2018 Round of 32	JS Saoura	1–0	ES Sétif	Béchar
17:00	Bourdim 90+1' (pen.)	Report; Live TV: None		Stadium: Stade 20 Août 1955; Referee: Lahlou Benbraham

2 February 2018 Round of 16	JS Saoura	1–0	USM Alger	Béchar
17:00	Yahia-Chérif 81'	Report; Live TV: EPTV Terrestre / TV Tamazight 4		Stadium: Stade 20 Août 1955; Referee: Farouk Mial

3 March 2018 Quarter-finals	USM Bel-Abbès	2–1	JS Saoura	Sidi Bel Abbès
16:00	Seguer 61'; Belahouel 86'	Report; Live TV: Algérie 3	28' Yahia-Chérif	Stadium: February 24, 1956 Stadium; Referee: Said Aouina

== Squad information ==
=== Playing statistics ===
No.	Pos	Nat	Player	Total		Ligue 1		Algerian Cup	
No.	Pos	Nat	Player	Apps	Goals	Apps	Goals	Apps	Goals
Goalkeepers
30	GK	(Algeria) ALG	Khaled Boukacem	29	0	29	0	0	0
	GK	(Algeria) ALG	Mohamed Seddik Mokrani	1	0	1	0	0	0
Defenders
2	DF	(Algeria) ALG	Mohamed El Amine Barka	21	0	21	0	0	0
4	DF	(Algeria) ALG	Ibrahim Bekakchi	26	2	26	2	0	0
12	DF	(Algeria) ALG	Zakaria Benchrifa	6	0	6	0	0	0
	DF	(Senegal) SEN	Elhadji Youssoupha Konaté	12	0	12	0	0	0
5	DF	(Algeria) ALG	Mohamed Amine Madani	19	0	19	0	0	0
15	DF	(Algeria) ALG	Fateh Talah	14	0	14	0	0	0
24	DF	(Algeria) ALG	Mohamed Tiboutine	24	0	24	0	0	0
	DF	(Algeria) ALG	Khaled Toubel	5	0	5	0	0	0
Midfielders
22	MF	(Algeria) ALG	Djamel Belalem	24	0	24	0	0	0
25	MF	(Algeria) ALG	Mohamed Essaid Bourahla	9	0	9	0	0	0
10	MF	(Algeria) ALG	Abderrahmane Bourdim	26	8	26	8	0	0
13	MF	(Algeria) ALG	Nabil Bousmaha	28	0	28	0	0	0
26	MF	(Algeria) ALG	Mohamed El Amine Hammia	23	2	23	2	0	0
18	MF	(Algeria) ALG	Messala Merbah	27	0	27	0	0	0
	MF	(Algeria) ALG	Billel Messaoudi	3	0	3	0	0	0
7	MF	(Algeria) ALG	Abdeldjalil Taki Eddine Saâd	17	1	17	1	0	0
	MF	(Algeria) ALG	Ibrahim Khalil Saïdi	1	0	1	0	0	0
Forwards
	FW	(Libya) LBA	Mohamed Al Ghanodi	8	0	8	0	0	0
17	FW	(Algeria) ALG	Moustapha Djallit	27	12	27	12	0	0
9	FW	(Algeria) ALG	Antar Djemaouni	5	1	5	1	0	0
8	FW	(Algeria) ALG	Sid Ali Yahia-Chérif	27	10	27	10	0	0
19	FW	(Algeria) ALG	Hamza Zaidi	23	0	23	0	0	0
Players transferred out during the season

Last updated: 12 June 2018
Source: fr.soccerway.com

== Squad list ==
As of August 25, 2017. Note: Flags indicate national team as defined under FIFA eligibility rules; some limited exceptions apply. Players may hold more than one non-FIFA nationality.

No.	Pos.	Nation	Player
1	GK	ALG	Houari Djemili
2	DF	ALG	Mohamed El Amine Barka
4	DF	ALG	Ibrahim Bekakchi
5	DF	ALG	Mohamed Amine Madani
7	MF	ALG	Abdeldjalil Taki Eddine Saâd
8	FW	ALG	Sid Ali Yahia-Chérif
9	FW	ALG	Antar Djemaouni
10	MF	ALG	Abderrahmane Bourdim
11	FW	ALG	Oussama Bellatreche
12	DF	ALG	Zakaria Benchrifa
13	MF	ALG	Nabil Bousmaha
15	DF	ALG	Fateh Talah
16	GK	ALG	Zakaria Bouziani

No.	Pos.	Nation	Player
17	FW	ALG	Moustapha Djallit (captain)
18	DF	ALG	Messala Merbah
19	FW	ALG	Hamza Zaidi
20	MF	ALG	Oussama Benkouider
22	MF	ALG	Djamel Belalem
23	DF	CMR	Jean-Jules Bapidi
24	DF	ALG	Mohamed Tiboutine
25	DF	ALG	Mohamed Essaid Bourahla
26	MF	ALG	Mohamed El Amine Hammia
30	GK	ALG	Khaled Boukacem
-	FW	ALG	Abderrahmane Guidoum
-	MF	ALG	Mohamed Amine Kabari

== Transfers ==
=== In ===
Date	Pos	Player	From club	Transfer fee	Source
2 July 2017	DF	(Algeria) Mohamed Amine Barka	(Algeria) ASM Oran	Free transfer	
2 July 2017	MF	(Algeria) Oussama Benkouider	(Algeria) US Biskra	Free transfer	
5 July 2017	DF	(Algeria) Zakaria Bencherifa	(Algeria) MO Béjaïa	Free transfer	
7 July 2017	MF	(Algeria) Mohamed Amine Kabari	(Algeria) US Biskra	Free transfer	
19 July 2017	FW	(Algeria) Antar Djemaouni	(Algeria) MC Alger	Free transfer	
19 July 2017		(Algeria) Mohamed Saïd Bourahla	(Algeria) MC El Eulma	Free transfer	
26 July 2017	FW	(Algeria) Sid Ali Yahia-Chérif	(Algeria) CR Belouizdad	Free transfer	
30 July 2017	CB	(Algeria) Mohamed Amine Madani	(Algeria) USM Alger	Undisclosed	
24 December 2017	GK	(Algeria) Mohamed Seddik Mokrani	USM El Harrach	Free transfer (Released)	
11 January 2018	FW	(Libya) Mohamed Al Ghanodi	(Libya) Al Ahli Tripoli	Free transfer	

=== Out ===
Date	Pos	Player	To club	Transfer fee	Source
21 July 2017	MF	(Algeria) Said Sayah	(Algeria) CR Belouizdad	Free transfer	
