= Abderrahmane Bourdim =

Algerian footballer (born 1994)

Personal information
- Full name: Abderrahmane Bourdim
- Date of birth: 14 June 1994 (age 32)
- Place of birth: El Eulma, Algeria
- Height: 1.71 m (5 ft 7 in)
- Position: Midfielder

Team information
- Current team: MC Oran
- Number: 4

Youth career
- –2013: MC El Eulma
- 2013–2014: USM Alger

Senior career*
Years	Team	Apps	(Gls)
2014–2016	USM Alger	2	(0)
2015–2016	→ RC Relizane (loan)	27	(4)
2016–2018	JS Saoura	49	(13)
2018–2021	MC Alger	47	(8)
2021–2023	CR Belouizdad	46	(12)
2023–2024	Hajer	6	(1)
2024	ASO Chlef	24	(6)
2025–	MC Oran	28	(6)

International career
2013	Algeria 20	5	(0)
2014	Algeria 23	5	(1)
2018–	Algeria	1	(0)
- * Club domestic league appearances and goals as of 6 June 2025

Abderrahmane Bourdim (Arabic: عبد الرحمان بورديم; born 14 June 1994) is an Algerian footballer who plays for MC Oran.

== Career ==
In July 2016, Bourdim extended his contract with USM Alger until 2021 and was also loaned out to JS Saoura for two seasons. In 2018, he joined MC Alger. In 2021, he joined CR Belouizdad. On 12 September 2023, Bourdim joined Saudi Arabian club Hajer. On 2 February 2024, he joined ASO Chlef.

== Career statistics ==
=== Club ===
As of 22 January 2025

Club	Season	League			Cup		Continental		Other		Total	
Club	Season	Division	Apps	Goals	Apps	Goals	Apps	Goals	Apps	Goals	Apps	Goals
USM Alger	2014–15	Ligue 1	2	0	0	0	—		—		2	0
→ RC Relizane (loan)	2015–16	Ligue 1	27	4	3	0	—		—		30	4
JS Saoura	2016–17	Ligue 1	23	5	3	0	2 (Note: All appearance(s) in Champions League)	1	—		28	6
JS Saoura	2017–18	Ligue 1	26	8	4	2	—		—		30	10
JS Saoura	Total		49	13	7	2	2	1	—		58	16
MC Alger	2018–19	Ligue 1	22	1	1	0	3	0	5 (Note: All appearances in Arab Club Champions Cup)	1	31	2
MC Alger	2019–20	Ligue 1	8	3	2	1	—		2	0	12	4
MC Alger	2020–21	Ligue 1	17	4	—		10	1	1 (Note: All appearances in League Cup)	0	0	0
MC Alger	Total		47	8	3	1	13	1	8	1	71	11
CR Belouizdad	2021–22	Ligue 1	24	6	—		1	0	—		25	6
CR Belouizdad	2022–23	Ligue 1	22	6	4	0	5	1	—		31	7
CR Belouizdad	Total		46	12	4	0	6	1	—		56	13
ASO Chlef	2023–24	Ligue 1	24	6	1	0	—		—		25	6
MC Oran	2024–25	Ligue 1	0	0	0	0	—		—		0	0
Career total			193	43	18	3	21	3	8	1	240	50

== Honours ==
CR Belouizdad

- Algerian Ligue Professionnelle 1: 2021–22, 2022–23
