= Aliou Dieng =

Malian footballer (born 1997)

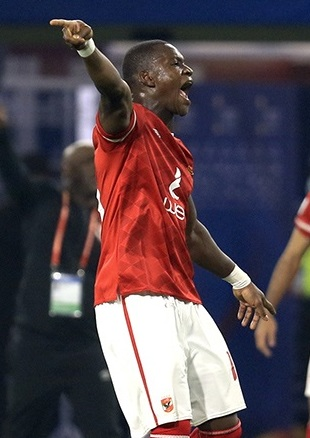
- Dieng with Al Ahly at the 2021 FIFA Club World Cup

Personal information
- Full name: Aliou Dieng
- Date of birth: 16 October 1997 (age 29)
- Place of birth: Bamako, Mali
- Height: 1.85 m (6 ft 1 in)
- Position: Defensive midfielder

Team information
- Current team: Valencia
- Number: 15

Senior career*
Years	Team	Apps	(Gls)
2016–2018	Djoliba AC	20	(0)
2018–2019	MC Alger	37	(1)
2019–2026	Al Ahly	145	(5)
2024–2025	→ Al-Kholood (loan)	30	(3)
2026–	Valencia	5	(0)

International career^{‡}
2015–2019	Mali U23	6	(0)
2016	Mali A'	6	(2)
2020–	Mali	58	(1)
Medal record
Men's football
Representing Mali
African Nations Championship
Runner-up	2016 Rwanda
- * Club domestic league appearances and goals as of 12 September 2026 ‡ National team caps and goals as of 4 October 2026

Aliou Dieng (born 16 October 1997) is a Malian professional footballer who plays as a defensive midfielder for La Liga club Valencia and the Mali national team.

== Club career ==
In July 2019, Dieng joined Egyptian club Al Ahly on a five-year contract for an undisclosed fee.

On 23 August 2024, Dieng joined Saudi Arabian club Al-Kholood on a one-year loan.

On 7 July 2026, Dieng signed for Valencia on a contract until 2028.

== International career ==
Dieng represented a local team of Mali at the 2016 African Nations Championship, and scored a penalty in their 2–1 quarter-final win over Tunisia. In 2020, Dieng played for the Malian national team for the first time at non-local level, in 2–1 victory against Namibia. With his home country, he also participated at the 2021 Africa Cup of Nations.

On 11 December 2025, Dieng was called up to the Mali squad for the 2025 Africa Cup of Nations.

== Career statistics ==
=== Club ===
As of 12 September 2026

Appearances and goals by club, season and competition
Club	Season	League			Cup		League Cup		Continental		Other		Total	
Club	Season	Division	Apps	Goals	Apps	Goals	Apps	Goals	Apps	Goals	Apps	Goals	Apps	Goals
MC Alger	2017–18	Algerian Ligue Professionnelle 1	10	0	3	0	—		8 (Note: Appearance(s) in the CAF Champions League)	0	—		21	0
MC Alger	2018–19	Algerian Ligue Professionnelle 1	27	1	2	0	—		—		—		32	1
MC Alger	Total		37	1	5	0	—		8	0	—		50	1
Al Ahly	2019–20	Egyptian Premier League	26	1	3	0	0	0	11	1	1 (Note: Appearance(s) in the Super Cup)	0	41	2
Al Ahly	2020–21	Egyptian Premier League	33	0	4	0	0	0	13	1	4 (Note: Appearance(s) in the Super Cup/CAF Super Cup/FIFA Club World Cup)	0	54	1
Al Ahly	2021–22	Egyptian Premier League	21	2	4	0	—		13	0	4	0	42	2
Al Ahly	2022–23	Egyptian Premier League	29	2	4	0	—		13	0	5	0	51	2
Al Ahly	2023–24	Egyptian Premier League	13	0	1	0	—		9 (Note: Five appearances in CAF Champions League, four appearances in African Football League)	0	2	0	25	0
Al Ahly	2024–25	Egyptian Premier League	0	0	0	0	—		0	0	1 (Note: Appearance in FIFA Club World Cup)	0	1	0
Al Ahly	2025–26	Egyptian Premier League	23	0	0	0	1	0	10	1	2 (Note: Appearance(s) in Egyptian Super Cup)	0	36	1
Al Ahly	Total		145	5	16	0	1	0	69	3	19	0	250	8
Al-Kholood (loan)	2024–25	Saudi Pro League	30	3	1	0	—		—		—		31	3
Valencia	2026–27	La Liga	5	0	0	0	—		—		—		5	0
Career total			217	9	21	0	0	0	77	3	19	0	334	12

=== International ===
As of match played 4 October 2026

Appearances and goals by national team and year
National team	Year	Apps	Goals
Mali	2015	2	0
Mali	2016	5	1
Mali	2017	5	0
Mali	2020	1	0
Mali	2021	7	0
Mali	2022	6	1
Mali	2023	6	0
Mali	2024	9	0
Mali	2025	10	0
Mali	2026	7	0
Total		58	2

Scores and results list Mali's goal tally first, score column indicates score after each Dieng goal.

List of international goals scored by Aliou Dieng
No.	Date	Venue	Opponent	Score	Result	Competition	Ref.
1	31 January 2016	Kigali Pelé Stadium, Kigali, Rwanda	Tunisia	1–0	2–1	2016 African Nations Championship	
1	9 June 2022	St. Mary's Stadium-Kitende, Entebbe, Uganda	South Sudan	3–1	3–1	2023 Africa Cup of Nations qualification	

== Honours ==
Al Ahly

- Egyptian Premier League: 2019–20, 2022–23, 2023–24
- Egypt Cup: 2019–20, 2021–22, 2022–23
- Egyptian Super Cup: 2018–19, 2021–22, 2022–23, 2023–24
- CAF Champions League: 2019–20, 2020–21, 2022–23, 2023–24
- CAF Super Cup: 2021 (May), 2021 (December)
