= Samy Frioui =

Algerian footballer (born 1991)

Personal information
- Full name: Samy Frioui
- Date of birth: 7 September 1991 (age 35)
- Place of birth: Kouba, Algeria
- Height: 1.80 m (5 ft 11 in)
- Position: Striker

Team information
- Current team: Al-Khaldiya SC

Youth career
- OMR El Annasser
- –2010: USM Alger

Senior career*
| Years | Team | Apps | (Gls) |
| 2010–2015 | USM Alger | 11 | (1) |
| 2014–2015 | → USM El Harrach (loan) | 12 | (0) |
| 2015–2016 | JSM Béjaïa | 25 | (2) |
| 2016–2018 | USM Blida | 51 | (19) |
| 2018 | AEL | 0 | (0) |
| 2019–2022 | MC Alger | 80 | (41) |
| 2022– | Al-Khaldiya SC | 0 | (0) |
- * Club domestic league appearances and goals as of 24 July 2022

Samy Frioui (born 7 September 1991) is an Algerian footballer who plays as a striker for Al-Khaldiya SC in Bahrain.

== Club career ==
Samy Frioui was born on 7 September 1991 in Kouba, a district located east of Algiers. He began playing football in the youth categories of USM Alger. He made a few sporadic appearances in the first team, before finally integrating the senior workforce during the 2013–2014 season, taking advantage of the decision of Rolland Courbis, then coach of USMA, not to carry out any recruitment during the transfer window. summer and instead promote five club prospects. Frioui scored a goal during his first start in a derby against USM El Harrach. but failed to win in the team since he only took part in six games in a season that sees USMA win the championship. Not appearing in the list of players selected for the 2014-2015 financial year, the young striker left the Rouge et Noir and joined USM El Harrach on loan for one season on 23 June 2014. Transferred to JSM Béjaïa in 2015, Frioui joined USM Blida still in D2, in 2016. Promoted to Division 1 in 2017, he scored 15 goals in the elite during the 2017–2018 season . This good season earned him an arrival in Europe, and on 8 June 2018 Frioui signed a 3-years contract with AEL. On 14 December 2018 Frioui left the club by mutual agreement, without having played any official league game. In 2018, he joined MC Alger.

== Career statistics ==
=== Club ===
As of 22 July 2022

| Club | Season | League | | | Cup | | Continental | | Other | | Total | |
| Club | Season | Division | Apps | Goals | Apps | Goals | Apps | Goals | Apps | Goals | Apps | Goals |
|---|---|---|---|---|---|---|---|---|---|---|---|---|
| USM Alger | 2010–11 | Ligue 1 | 4 | 0 | 0 | 0 | — | | | | 4 | 0 |
| USM Alger | 2011–12 | Ligue 1 | 0 | 0 | 0 | 0 | — | | | | 0 | 0 |
| USM Alger | 2012–13 | Ligue 1 | 1 | 0 | 0 | 0 | 0 | 0 | — | | 1 | 0 |
| USM Alger | 2013–14 | Ligue 1 | 6 | 1 | 1 | 0 | 0 | 0 | 0 | 0 | 7 | 1 |
| USM Alger | Total | | 11 | 1 | 1 | 0 | 0 | 0 | 0 | 0 | 12 | 1 |
| → USM El Harrach (loan) | 2014–15 | Ligue 1 | 12 | 0 | 1 | 0 | — | | | | 13 | 0 |
| JSM Béjaïa | 2015–16 | Ligue 2 | 25 | 2 | 3 | 0 | — | | | | 28 | 2 |
| USM Blida | 2016–17 | Ligue 2 | 22 | 4 | 3 | 0 | — | | | | 25 | 4 |
| USM Blida | 2017–18 | Ligue 1 | 29 | 15 | 4 | 2 | — | | | | 33 | 17 |
| USM Blida | Total | | 51 | 19 | 7 | 2 | — | | | | 58 | 21 |
| AEL | 2018–19 | Super League Greece | 0 | 0 | 1 | 0 | — | | | | 1 | 0 |
| MC Alger | 2018–19 | Ligue 1 | 14 | 4 | 1 | 0 | 2 (Note: All appearance(s) in Arab Club Champions Cup) | 0 | — | | 17 | 4 |
| MC Alger | 2019–20 | Ligue 1 | 15 | 9 | 2 | 1 | 5 | 2 | — | | 22 | 12 |
| MC Alger | 2020–21 | Ligue 1 | 20 | 11 | 0 | 0 | 10 (Note: All appearance(s) in CAF Champions League) | 3 | — | | 30 | 14 |
| MC Alger | 2021–22 | Ligue 1 | 31 | 17 | 0 | 0 | 0 | 0 | — | | 31 | 17 |
| MC Alger | Total | | 80 | 41 | 3 | 1 | 17 | 5 | 0 | 0 | 100 | 47 |
| Al-Khaldiya SC | 2022–23 | Bahraini Premier League | 0 | 0 | 0 | 0 | — | | — | | 0 | 0 |
| Career total | | | 179 | 63 | 16 | 3 | 17 | 5 | 0 | 0 | 212 | 71 |

== Honours ==
USM Alger

- Ligue Professionnelle 1: 2013–14
- Arab Club Champions Cup: 2012–13
- Algerian Cup: 2012–13
- Super Cup: 2013

Al-Khaldiya

- Bahraini Premier League: 2023, 2024
- Bahraini Super Cup: 2022
