= Oualid Mamoun =

French-Algerian footballer (born 1996)

Personal information
- Full name: Oualid Tarik Mamoun
- Date of birth: April 3, 1996 (age 30)
- Place of birth: Mantes-la-Jolie, France
- Position: Midfielder

Team information
- Current team: FC Mantois 78

Youth career
- FC Mantois 78
- 2013–2018: Angers

Senior career*
Years	Team	Apps	(Gls)
2013–2018	Angers B	81	(0)
2018	MC Alger	1	(0)
2019–	FC Mantes	4	(0)
- * Club domestic league appearances and goals as of 00:00, February 5, 2019 (EST)

Oualid Tarik Mamoun (born April 3, 1996, in Mantes-la-Jolie) is a French-Algerian footballer who currently plays for FC Mantois 78.

In June 2016, Mamoun signed his first professional contract with Angers SCO.

In June 2018, Mamoun signed a two-year contract with Algerian Ligue Professionnelle 1 club.
