= Ryad Kenniche =

Algerian footballer (born 1993)

Personal information
- Full name: Ryad Kamar Eddine Kenniche
- Date of birth: April 30, 1993 (age 33)
- Place of birth: Hussein Dey, Algeria
- Height: 1.86 m (6 ft 1 in)
- Positions: Centre-back; right-back

Youth career
- NA Hussein Dey

Senior career*
Years	Team	Apps	(Gls)
2013–2015	USM El Harrach	22	(3)
2015–2017	ES Sétif	35	(0)
2017–2018	Al-Qadsiah	3	(0)
2018	CR Belouizdad	5	(1)
2019	MC Alger	2	(0)
2020	US Tataouine	2	(0)
2020–2021	Olympique de Médéa	12	(0)

International career
2012	Algeria U20	1	(0)
2014–2016	Algeria U23	21	(1)
- * Club domestic league appearances and goals as of 27 October 2020

Ryad Kamar Eddine Kenniche (born April 30, 1993) is an Algerian professional footballer who last played for Olympique de Médéa in the Algerian Ligue Professionnelle 1. He can play as either a centre-back or right-back.

== Club career ==
In the summer of 2015, the league's Dispute Resolution Commission terminated Kenniche's contract with USM El Harrach for unpaid back wages and, shortly after, he signed a two-year contract with ES Sétif.
