= Hichem Chérif El-Ouazzani =

Algerian footballer (born 1996)

Personal information
- Full name: Hichem Chérif El-Ouazzani
- Date of birth: 1 January 1996 (age 30)
- Place of birth: Oran, Algeria
- Height: 1.78 m (5 ft 10 in)
- Position: Midfielder

Team information
- Current team: IRB El Kerma

Youth career
- 2005–2012: MC Oran
- 2012–2013: USM Oran
- 2014–2015: MC Alger

Senior career*
Years	Team	Apps	(Gls)
2015–2019	MC Alger	59	(1)
2021–2022	Club Africain		
2021	→ AS Rejiche (loan)		
2021–2022	→ ES Métlaoui (loan)		
2022–2023	ASM Oran		
2024–	IRB El Kerma		

International career^{‡}
2017–	Algeria	2	(0)
- * Club domestic league appearances and goals as of 05 February 2025 (UTC) ‡ National team caps and goals as of 12 October 2018

Hichem Chérif El-Ouazzani (born 1 January 1996) is an Algerian professional footballer who currently plays as a midfielder for IRB El Kerma.

== Professional career ==
Chérif El-Ouazzani made his professional debut with MC Alger in a 2-1 Algerian Ligue Professionnelle 1 loss to RC Arbaâ 29 May 2015.

On 31 January 2019, El-Ouazzani was sentenced to a four-year suspension and a big fine after being tested positive for doping substances, including cocaine. However, he said that he did not intend to become doped when he smoked waterpipe with his friends on the eve of the match against the CR Belouizdad on 17 January. The player also assured that he did not know that the substances in question were mixed with tobacco. The test showed positive on methylergometrine and benzoylecgonine, which is the main metabolite of cocaine.

== International career ==
Chérif El-Ouazzani made his debut for the Algeria national football team in a 1-1 2018 African Nations Championship qualification tie with Libya on 18 August 2017.

== Personal life ==
Hichem Chérif El-Ouazzani is the son of the manager and former international footballer Tahar Chérif El-Ouazzani.

== Controversy ==
On January 31, 2019, Hichem Chérif El-Ouazzani was suspended for 4 years by the Algerian League's Discipline Commission due to doping affair. However the suspension was reduced to 2 years.
