= M'Hamed Merouani =

Professional footballer (b. 1997)

Personal information
- Full name: M'Hamed Merouani
- Date of birth: August 29, 1997 (age 29)
- Place of birth: Chlef, Algeria
- Position: Defender

Team information
- Current team: ES Ben Aknoun
- Number: 4

Youth career
- ASO Chlef

Senior career*
Years	Team	Apps	(Gls)
2014–2019	ASO Chlef	49	(0)
2019–2023	MC Alger	55	(0)
2024–2025	NC Magra	28	(3)
2025–2026	MC El Bayadh	25	(0)
2026–	ES Ben Aknoun	0	(0)
- * Club domestic league appearances and goals as of 12 July 2026

M'Hamed Merouani (Arabic: محمد مرواني; born March 29, 1997) is an Algerian footballer who plays for ES Ben Aknoun.

== Career ==
Merouani Played for ASO Chlef from 2014 to 2019. In 2019, he joined MC Alger.In 2023, he left MC Alger. In July 2025, he signed for MC El Bayadh. On 12 July 2026, he joined ES Ben Aknoun.
