= Abdelkrim Benarous =

Algerian footballer (born 1997)

Personal information
- Full name: Abdelkrim Benarous
- Date of birth: June 2, 1997 (age 29)
- Place of birth: Algiers, Algeria
- Position: Forward

Team information
- Current team: USM Blida
- Number: 7

Youth career
- MC Alger

Senior career*
| Years | Team | Apps | (Gls) |
| 2018–2020 | MC Alger | 12 | (1) |
| 2020–2021 | Stade Tunisien | 5 | (0) |
| 2021–2023 | USM El Harrach | | |
| 2023–2024 | US Souf | 0 | (0) |
| 2024–2025 | NRB Teleghma | | |
| 2025– | USM Blida | | |
- * Club domestic league appearances and goals as of 8 November 2025

Abdelkrim Benarous (Arabic: عبد الكريم بن عروس; born June 2, 1997) is an Algerian footballer who plays for USM Blida.

== Career ==
In 2020, he joined Tunisian club Stade Tunisien. In 2025, he signed for USM Blida.
