= Farès Hachi =

Algerian footballer (born 1989)

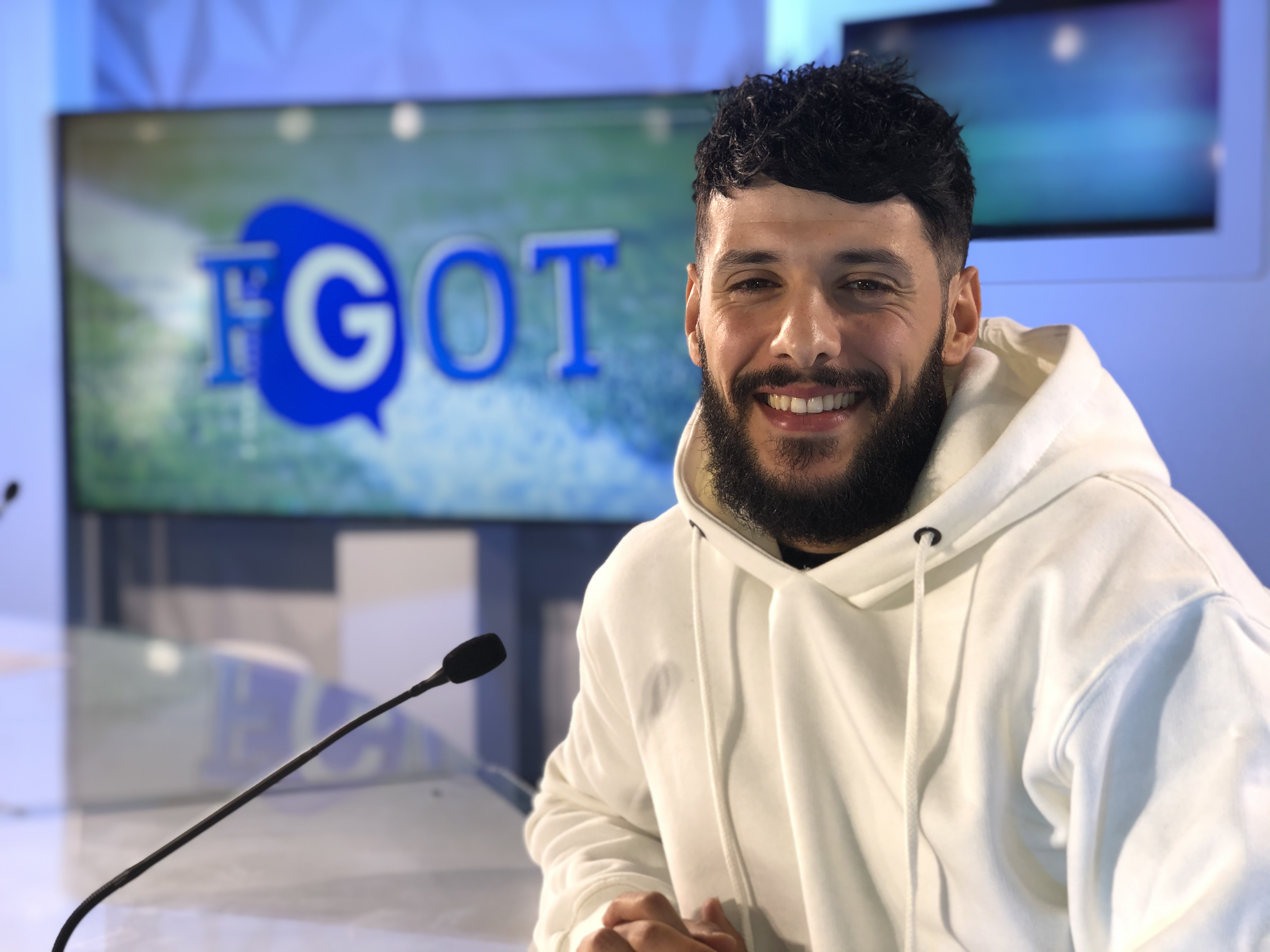

Personal information
- Date of birth: 5 November 1989 (age 37)
- Place of birth: El Biar, Algeria
- Height: 1.75 m (5 ft 9 in)
- Position: Left-back

Team information
- Current team: Maritzburg United F.C.
- Number: 3

Youth career
- Saint-Martin-d'Hères

Senior career*
Years	Team	Apps	(Gls)
2009–2010	Échirolles	30	(2)
2010–2011	Cassis Carnoux	25	(3)
2011–2012	Chamois Niortais	6	(0)
2012–2015	Grenoble	75	(3)
2015–2016	ES Sétif	43	(0)
2017–2018	Mamelodi Sundowns	21	(0)
2018	→ Chippa United (loan)	5	(0)
2018–2019	MC Alger	12	(0)
2019–2020	Lyon Duchère	5	(0)
2020-	Maritzburg United F.C.	10	(0)
- * Club domestic league appearances and goals as of 21:13, 17 October 2021 (UTC)

Farès Hachi (born 5 November 1989) is an Algerian professional footballer who currently plays for AS Lyon Duchère in the Championnat National.

Before joining MC Alger in 2017, Hachi had spent the whole of his senior career in France, representing Échirolles, Cassis Carnoux, Chamois Niortais and Grenoble and in Algeria with ES Sétif and in South Africa with Mamelodi Sundowns.

== Club career ==
=== Mamelodi Sundowns ===
The Algerian left-hander has signed for two and a half years with Mamelodi Sundowns, defending champion of South Africa and last winner of the African C1 to become the first Algerian player to play in South Africa.

== Career statistics ==
=== Club ===
As of 25 August 2017

Club	Season	League			Cup (Note: Includes the Nedbank Cup and Algerian Cup)		League Cup		Continental		Other		Total	
Club	Season	Division	Apps	Goals	Apps	Goals	Apps	Goals	Apps	Goals	Apps	Goals	Apps	Goals
ES Sétif	2015–16	Ligue 1	23	0	3	0	—		9 (Note: All appearance(s) in CAF Champions League)	0	1 (Note: All appearances in Algerian Super Cup)	0	36	0
ES Sétif	2016–17	Ligue 1	8	0	—		—		—		—		8	0
ES Sétif	Total		31	0	3	0	—		9	0	1	0	44	0
Mamelodi Sundowns	2016–17	Premier Soccer League	12	0	1	0	—		2	0	—		15	0
Mamelodi Sundowns	2017–18	Premier Soccer League	5	0	0	0	—		0	0	—		1	0
Mamelodi Sundowns	Total		13	0	1	0	—		2	0	—		16	0
Career total			0	0	0	0	—		0	0	0	0	0	0

== Honours ==
ES Sétif

- Algerian Super Cup: 2015

Mamelodi Sundowns

- CAF Super Cup: 2017
