= List of JS Saoura players =

Below is a list of notable footballers who have played for JS Saoura. Generally, this means players that have played 100 or more league matches for the club. However, some players who have played fewer matches are also included; this includes players that have had considerable success either at other clubs or at international level, as well as players who are well remembered by the supporters for particular reasons.

Players are listed in alphabetical order according to the date of their first-team official debut for the club. Appearances and goals are for first-team competitive matches only. Substitute appearances included. Statistics accurate as of 11 June 2022.

== List of JS Saoura players ==
Name	Nat.	Position	Inter career	Appearances	Goals	Notes
Ahmed Sefioune	(Algeria)	GK	2012–14	34	0	
Salah Laouti	(Algeria)	GK	2012–17	42	0	
Djilali Terbah	(Algeria)	DF	2012–16	89	2	
Touhami Sebie	(Algeria)	DF	2012–16	67	5	
Abdelmalek Merbah	(Algeria)	DF	2012–13	15	1	
Sekou Bagayoko	(Mali)	DF	2012–14	56	6	
Youcef Sabouni	(Algeria)	DF	2012–14	28	0	
Abdelkader Benmohamed	(Algeria)	DF	2012–15	43	2	
Youcef Bekradja	(Algeria)	DF	2012–14	13	0	
Kaddour Beldjilali	(Algeria)	MF	2012–14, 2019	69	12	
Mahfoud Amri	(Algeria)	MF	2012–16	68	4	
Nabil Bousmaha	(Algeria)	MF	2012–18	169	1	
Fatah Fathi	(Algeria)	MF	2012–13	11	0	
Abdenour Belkheir	(Algeria)	FW	2012–16	110	6	
Mohamed Abdelaziz Tchikou	(Algeria)	FW	2012–13	26	1	
Adil Tebbal	(Algeria)	FW	2012–13	18	1	
Okacha Hamzaoui	(Algeria)	FW	2012–15	37	7	
Abdelhak Motrani	(Algeria)	FW	2012–13	20	3	
Mourad Benayad	(Algeria)	FW	2012–13	12	0	
Habib Bouguelmouna	(Algeria)	FW	2012–14	16	3	
Kheireddine Boussouf	(Algeria)	GK	2013–14	13	0	
Khaled Toubal	(Algeria)	DF	2013–18	84	1	
Saïd Sayah	(Algeria)	MF	2013–17	82	6	
Abdelmalek Barbari	(Algeria)	MF	2013–14	12	0	
Mohamed Aoudou	(Benin)	FW	2013–15	44	15	
Mohamed Zaoui	(Algeria)	FW	2013–15	34	2	
Sidi Mohamed Mebarki	(Algeria)	FW	2013–14	19	5	
Oussama Meddahi	(Algeria)	DF	2019–21	56	1	
Fateh Talah	(Algeria)	DF	2017–21	72	1	
Sid Ali Yahia-Chérif	(Algeria)	FW	2017–21	88	19	
Billel Messaoudi	(Algeria)	FW	2017–21	45	21	
Hamza Zaidi	(Algeria)	FW	2015–21	146	23	
Oussama Kaddour	(Algeria)	DF	2019–21	31	0	
Nacereddine Khoualed	(Algeria)	DF	2018–20	32	2	
Ziri Hammar	(Algeria)	MF	2015–16, 2019–20	32	5	
Ibrahim Farhi	(Algeria)	MF	2018–20	36	4	
Khalil Semahi	(Algeria)	FW	2019–20	11	0	
Abderaouf Natèche	(Algeria)	GK	2018–19	24	0	
Khaled Boukacem	(Algeria)	GK	2017–19	37	0	
Mohamed Walid Tiboutine	(Algeria)	DF	2015–19	84	1	
Ibrahim Bekakchi	(Algeria)	DF	2016–19	72	4	
Messala Merbah	(Algeria)	MF	2014–19	96	2	
Moustapha Djallit	(Algeria)	FW	2015–19	93	34	
Mohamed Boulaouidet	(Algeria)	FW	2018–19	19	4	
Elhadji Youssoupha Konaté	(Senegal)	DF	2017–19	31	1	
Mohamed El Amine Barka	(Algeria)	DF	2017–19	29	0	
Djamel Belalem	(Algeria)	MF	2016–18	33	0	
Abderrahmane Bourdim	(Algeria)	MF	2016–18	49	13	
Houari Djemili	(Algeria)	GK	2015–17	56	0	
Jean-Jules Bapidi	(Cameroon)	DF	2014–18	88	6	
Mohamed Lagraâ	(Algeria)	MF	2015–17	42	0	
Sofiane Bencharif	(Algeria)	FW	2016–17	21	2	
Thomas Ulimwengu	(Tanzania)	FW	2018–19	13	1	
Sid Ahmed Aouedj	(Algeria)	MF	2018	12	0	
Zakaria Saidi	(Algeria)	GK	2019–present	78	0	
Riyane Akacem	(Algeria)	DF	2019–present	42	0	
Mohamed Amrane	(Algeria)	DF	2020–present	49	5	
Imadeddine Boubekeur	(Algeria)	DF	2018–present	92	5	
Marwane Khelif	(Algeria)	DF	2020–present	42	0	
Abderrazak Khelifi	(Algeria)	MF	2018–present	55	0	
Belaid Hamidi	(Algeria)	MF	2019–present	83	22	
Adel Bouchiba	(Algeria)	MF	2018–present	118	1	
Mohamed El Amine Hammia	(Algeria)	MF	2014–present	185	23	
Benamar Mellal	(Algeria)	MF	2021–present	29	4	
Oussama Bellatreche	(Algeria)	FW	2015–18, 2021–present	42	10	
Aimen Lahmeri	(Algeria)	FW	2018–present	85	20	
Ismaïl Saâdi	(Algeria)	FW	2021–present	31	4	
Mohamed Daoud	(Algeria)	MF	2020–present	42	2	
Mohamed Amine Ouis	(Algeria)	FW	2021–present	25	1	
Mohamed Lamine Boutouala	(Algeria)	FW	2018–present	21	0	
Omar Adrar	(Algeria)	FW	2010–present	15	3	
Abdeljalil Saâd	(Algeria)	MF	2012–present	112	24	

Nationalities are indicated by the corresponding FIFA country code.

== List of All-time appearances ==
This List of All-time appearances for JS Saoura contains football players who have played for JS Saoura and have managed to accrue 100 or more appearances.

Bold Still playing competitive football in JS Saoura. (Note: The statistics of all the games except 2019–20 Arab Club Champions Cup Preliminary round, Statistics correct as of game against CS Constantine on June 5, 2026.)

#	Name	Position	League	Cup	Others^{1}	Africa^{2}	Arab^{3}	TOTAL									
#	Name	Position	League	Cup	Others^{1}	Africa^{2}	Arab^{3}	TOTAL	1	(Algeria) Mohamed El Amine Hammia	2014–25	246	12	0	21	4	283
2	(Algeria) Adel Bouchiba	2018–	220	12	0	20	6	258									
3	(Algeria) Nabil Bousmaha	2012–18	169	10	0	4	0	183									
4	(Algeria) Abdeldjalil Saâd	2012–24	154	11	0	14	3	182									
5	(Algeria) Hamza Zaidi	2015–21	146	9	0	10	2	167									
6	(Algeria) Messala Merbah	2014–19	108	7	0	11	0	126									
7	(Algeria) Aimen Lahmeri	2018–23	101	6	0	14	3	124									
8	(Algeria) Abdenour Belkheir	2012–16	107	3	0	0	0	110									
9	(Algeria) Moustapha Djallit	2015–19	93	8	0	6	0	107									
10	(Algeria) Sid Ali Yahia-Chérif	2017–19	88	6	0	8	3	105									

^{1} ^{Includes the Super Cup and League Cup.} ^{2} ^{Includes the Confederation Cup and Champions League.} ^{3} ^{Includes the UAFA Club Cup.}

== List of leading goalscorers ==
Bold Still playing competitive football in JS Saoura.

List of JS Saoura players with 10 or more goals
#	Name	Position	League	Cup	Others^{1}	Africa^{2}	Arab^{3}	TOTAL									
#	Name	Position	League	Cup	Others^{1}	Africa^{2}	Arab^{3}	TOTAL	1	(Algeria) Mohamed El Amine Hammia	MF	31	3	0	5	1	40
2	(Algeria) Moustapha Djallit	FW	34	1	0	0	0	35									
3	(Algeria) Aimen Lahmeri	FW	23	1	1	4	0	29									
4	(Algeria) Billel Messaoudi	FW	21	2	2	0	3	28									
5	(Algeria) Abdeldjalil Saâd	MF	26	1	0	1	0	28									
6	(Algeria) Belaid Hamidi	MF	22	1	1	1	0	25									
=	(Algeria) Sid Ali Yahia-Chérif	FW	19	2	0	3	1	25									
=	(Algeria) Oussama Bellatreche	FW	20	2	0	3	0	25									
9	(Algeria) Hamza Zaidi	FW	23	1	0	0	0	24									
10	(Algeria) Kaddour Beldjilali	MF	19	0	0	0	0	19									
11	(Algeria) Abderrahmane Bourdim	MF	13	2	0	1	0	16									
12	(Benin) Mohamed Aoudou	FW	15	0	0	0	0	15									
13	(Algeria) Abdelkader Boutiche	MF	13	1	0	0	0	14									
=	(Algeria) Oussama Bentaleb	FW	11	3	0	0	0	14									
15	(Algeria) Mohamed Souibaâh	FW	9	1	0	0	0	10									

^{1} ^{Includes the Super Cup.} ^{2} ^{Includes the Confederation Cup and Champions League.} ^{3} ^{Includes the UAFA Club Cup.}

== Players to Europe ==
Player	Pos	Club	League	Transfer fee	Source
(Algeria) Billel Messaoudi	FW	Kortrijk	(Belgium) Jupiler Pro League	Free transfer	

== List of international footballers ==
JS Saoura international footballers
Name	Position	Date of first cap	Debut against	Date of last cap	Final match against	Caps	Ref
(Benin) Mohamed Aoudou	FW	17 May 2014	São Tomé and Príncipe	12 Oct 2014	Tanzania	4	
(Tanzania) Thomas Ulimwengu	FW	24 Mar 2019	Uganda	27 Jun 2019	Kenya	5	
