= 2013–14 JS Saoura season =

JS Saoura
2013–14 season
- Owner: Entreprise Nationale de Forage
- President: Mohamed Zerouati
- Head coach: Abdelkader Amrani (from 1 July 2013} (until 27 August 2013} Ali Mechiche (from 29 August 2013} (until 8 December 2013} Alain Michel (from 20 December 2013}
- Stadium: Stade 20 Août 1955
- Ligue 1: 9th
- Algerian Cup: Round of 64
- Top goalscorer: League: Mohamed Aoudou (10); All: Mohamed Aoudou (10)

During the 2013/14 season, JS Saoura competed in the Ligue 1 for the 2nd season, as well as the Algerian Cup.

== Squad list ==
Players and squad numbers last updated on 24 August 2013.
Note: Flags indicate national team as has been defined under FIFA eligibility rules. Players may hold more than one non-FIFA nationality.

No.	Nat.	Position	Name	Date of birth (age)	Signed from
Goalkeepers
	(Algeria)	GK		Missing required parameter 1=month! 19 (aged 1993–1994)	(Algeria) [[]]
	(Algeria)	GK		Missing required parameter 1=month! 19 (aged 1993–1994)	(Algeria) [[]]
	(Algeria)	GK		Missing required parameter 1=month! 19 (aged 1993–1994)	(Algeria) [[]]
Defenders
	(Algeria)			Missing required parameter 1=month! 19 (aged 1993–1994)	(Algeria) [[]]
	(Algeria)			Missing required parameter 1=month! 19 (aged 1993–1994)	(Algeria) [[]]
	(Algeria)			Missing required parameter 1=month! 19 (aged 1993–1994)	(Algeria) [[]]
	(Algeria)			Missing required parameter 1=month! 19 (aged 1993–1994)	(Algeria) [[]]
Midfielders
	(Algeria)			Missing required parameter 1=month! 19 (aged 1993–1994)	(Algeria) [[]]
	(Algeria)			Missing required parameter 1=month! 19 (aged 1993–1994)	(Algeria) [[]]
	(Algeria)			Missing required parameter 1=month! 19 (aged 1993–1994)	(Algeria) [[]]
	(Algeria)			Missing required parameter 1=month! 19 (aged 1993–1994)	(Algeria) [[]]
Forwards
	(Algeria)			Missing required parameter 1=month! 19 (aged 1993–1994)	(Algeria) [[]]
	(Algeria)			Missing required parameter 1=month! 19 (aged 1993–1994)	(Algeria) [[]]
	(Algeria)			Missing required parameter 1=month! 19 (aged 1993–1994)	(Algeria) [[]]
	(Algeria)			Missing required parameter 1=month! 19 (aged 1993–1994)	(Algeria) [[]]

== Competitions ==
=== Overview ===
Competition	Record								Started round	Final position / round	First match	Last match
Competition	G	W	D	L	GF	GA	GD	Win %	Started round	Final position / round	First match	Last match
Ligue 1	30	13	6	11	38	36	+2	43.33	—N/a	9th	24 August 2013	22 May 2014
Algerian Cup	1	0	0	1	0	1	−1	0.00	Round of 64		6 December 2013	
Total	31	13	6	12	38	37	+1	41.94				

Updated to match played 9 May 2017
Source: Competitions

== League table ==
Pos	Team	Pld	W	D	L	GF	GA	GD	Pts	Qualification or relegation
7	RC Arbaâ (Note: RC Arbaâ would have qualified for the CAF Confederation Cup preliminary round by finishing seventh in the 2013–14 Algerian Ligue Professionnelle 1, after the elimination of the USM El Harrach but were unable to participate because they were not adopted by the CAF as a professional team.)	30	12	8	10	33	32	+1	44	
8	ASO Chlef	30	11	10	9	29	19	+10	43	Qualification for the Confederation Cup preliminary round
9	JS Saoura	30	12	7	11	38	36	+2	43	
10	CS Constantine	30	10	11	9	30	31	−1	41	
11	MO Béjaïa	30	10	6	14	29	35	−6	36	

Updated to match(es) played on 22 May 2014. Source: DZFoot
Rules for classification: 1) points; 2) head-to-head points; 3) head-to-head goal difference; 4) goal difference; 5) total goals; 6) fairplay ranking; 7) playoff.

=== Results summary ===
Overall								Home						Away					
Pld	W	D	L	GF	GA	GD	Pts	W	D	L	GF	GA	GD	W	D	L	GF	GA	GD
30	12	7	11	39	36	+3	43	9	3	3	24	15	+9	3	4	8	15	21	−6

Last updated: 29 December 2014.
Source: Competitive matches

=== Results by round ===
Round	1	2	3	4	5	6	7	8	9	10	11	12	13	14	15	16	17	18	19	20	21	22	23	24	25	26	27	28	29	30
Ground	H	A	A	H	A	H	A	H	A	H	A	H	A	H	A	A	H	H	A	H	A	H	A	H	A	H	A	H	A	H
Result	W	D	W	L	D	D	L	W	L	W	L	L	L	D	W	L	W	W	D	W	L	W	L	D	W	L	D	W	L	W
Position	2	3	1	7	6	7	9	8	9	7	8	10	10	12	10	10	10	9	10	7	9	7	10	10	9	9	9	7	9	9

Updated to match(es) played on 29 December 2014. Source: Competitive matches
A = Away; H = Home; W = Win; D = Draw; L = Loss

=== Matches ===
24 August 2013 Round 1	JS Saoura	3–1	USM El Harrach	Béchar
17:00	M. Mebarki 15', 45+1'; M. Amri 88'	Report	81' Azzi	Stadium: Stade 20 Août 1955; Referee: Redouane Necib

31 August 2013 Round 2	MO Béjaïa	1–1	JS Saoura	Béjaïa
18:00	Z. Nemdil 85' (pen.)	Report	5' Hamzaoui	Stadium: Stade de l'Unité Maghrébine; Referee: Abderrezzak Arab

3 September 2013 Round 3	MC El Eulma	1–2	JS Saoura	El Eulma
18:00	Berchiche 73'	Report	8' Bagayoko; 90+1' Zaoui	Stadium: Stade Messaoud Zougar; Referee: Mokhtar Amalou

14 September 2013 Round 4	JS Saoura	0–3	CS Constantine	Béchar
16:00		Report	1', 35' Boulemdaïs; 85' Henaini	Stadium: Stade 20 Août 1955; Referee: Mohamed Bichari

21 September 2013 Round 5	CRB Aïn Fakroun	0–0	JS Saoura	Aïn M'lila
16:00		Report		Stadium: Stade des Frères Demane Debbih; Referee: Mehdi Abid Charef

28 September 2013 Round 6	JS Saoura	0–0	USM Alger	Béchar
16:00		Report		Stadium: Stade 20 Août 1955; Referee: Rafik Achouri

5 October 2013 Round 7	CR Belouizdad	2–1	JS Saoura	Algiers
17:00	Bourakba 29'; Hanifi 47' (pen.)	Report	57' (pen.) M. Mebarki	Stadium: Stade 20 Août 1955; Attendance: 0 (close doors); Referee: Abderrezzak Arab

19 October 2013 Round 8	JS Saoura	3–1	MC Oran	Béchar
15:00	Aoudou 23', 38'; Bagayoko 78'	Report	84' F. Amrane	Stadium: Stade 20 Août 1955; Referee: Boubekeur Zouaoui

26 October 2013 Round 9	RC Arbaâ	2–1	JS Saoura	Blida
15:00	Amiri 30' (pen.), 57'	Report	11' Beldjilali	Stadium: Stade Frères Brakni; Referee: Said Aouina

2 November 2013 Round 10	JS Saoura	2–0	JSM Béjaïa	Béchar
15:00	Aoudou 10', 64'	Report		Stadium: Stade 20 Août 1955; Referee: Merzak Halalchi

9 November 2013 Round 11	ES Sétif	1–0	JS Saoura	Sétif
17:00	Lamri 87'	Report		Stadium: Stade 8 Mai 1945; Referee: Sofiane Bousseter

23 November 2013 Round 12	JS Saoura	0–1	ASO Chlef	Béchar
15:00		Report	90+1' Daham	Stadium: Stade 20 Août 1955; Referee: Farouk Mial

30 November 2013 Round 13	MC Alger	3–0	JS Saoura	Algiers
18:00	Aksas 22', 51'; Hachoud 82'	Report		Stadium: Stade Omar Hamadi; Referee: Redouane Necib

14 December 2013 Round 14	JS Saoura	1–1	JS Kabylie	Béchar
15:00	Sebie 40'	Report	12' Sedkaoui	Stadium: Stade 20 Août 1955; Referee: Boubekeur Zouaoui

28 December 2013 Round 15	CA Bordj Bou Arréridj	0–3	JS Saoura	Bordj Bou Arréridj
15:00		Report	58', 80' Aoudou; 84' Beldjilali	Stadium: Stade 20 Août 1955; Referee: Mohamed Bichari

18 January 2014 Round 16	USM El Harrach	1–0	JS Saoura	Algiers
15:00	Abid 17' (pen.)	Report		Stadium: Stade 1er Novembre 1954; Referee: Mehdi Abid Charef

1 February 2014 Round 17	JS Saoura	2–1	MO Béjaïa	Béchar
15:00	Beldjilali 15' (pen.), 62'	Report	40' F. Rahal	Stadium: Stade 20 Août 1955; Referee: Said Aouina

8 February 2014 Round 18	JS Saoura	3–2	MC El Eulma	Béchar
15:00	Zaoui 45+3'; Belkheir 74'; Hamzaoui 88'	Report	36' Chenihi; 90' Hamiti	Stadium: Stade 20 Août 1955; Referee: Sofiane Bousseter

14 February 2014 Round 19	CS Constantine	1–1	JS Saoura	Constantine
15:00	Houri 63'	Report	74' Aoudou	Stadium: Stade Mohamed Hamlaoui; Referee: Farouk Mial

22 February 2014 Round 20	JS Saoura	2–1	CRB Aïn Fakroun	Béchar
15:00	Hamzaoui 55'; Bagayoko 57'	Report	84' E. Daoudi	Stadium: Stade 20 Août 1955; Referee: Youssef Zerrouki

1 March 2014 Round 21	USM Alger	1–0	JS Saoura	Algiers
18:00	Meftah (yellow card) 29' (goal) 89' (pen.); Feham (yellow card) 50'	Report		Stadium: Stade Omar Hamadi; Referee: Mohamed Sahraoui

8 March 2014 Round 22	JS Saoura	1–0	CR Belouizdad	Béchar
15:00	Bagayoko 90+3'	Report		Stadium: Stade 20 Août 1955; Referee: Rafik Achouri

15 March 2014 Round 23	MC Oran	4–1	JS Saoura	Oran
15:00	Dagoulou 25', 55'; M. Fekih 57', 65'	Report	63' Aoudou	Stadium: Ahmed Zabana Stadium; Referee: Farouk Houasnia

22 March 2014 Round 24	JS Saoura	1–1	RC Arbaâ	Béchar
15:00	A. Benmohamed 85'	Report	15' (pen.) Amiri	Stadium: Stade 20 Août 1955; Referee: Mehdi Abid Charef

26 April 2014 Round 25	JSM Béjaïa	1–4	JS Saoura	Béjaïa
15:00	O. Meddahi 37' (pen.)	Report	16' Aoudou; 24', 46' Belkheir; 49' M. Amri	Stadium: Stade de l'Unité Maghrébine; Referee: Lyés Bekouassa

3 May 2014 Round 26	JS Saoura	0–3	ES Sétif	Béchar
17:00		Report	47' Lagraâ; 67' Karaoui; 86' Nadji	Stadium: Stade 20 Août 1955; Referee: Ahmed Bouzrar

10 May 2014 Round 27	ASO Chlef	1–1	JS Saoura	Chlef
17:00	Tedjar 19'	Report	85' Aoudou	Stadium: Stade Mohamed Boumezrag; Referee: Merzak Halalchi

13 May 2014 Round 28	JS Saoura	2–0	MC Alger	Béchar
17:00	Beldjilali 57' (pen.); M. Mebarki 90+4'	Report		Stadium: Stade 20 Août 1955; Referee: Lahlou Benbraham

17 May 2014 Round 29	JS Kabylie	2–0	JS Saoura	Tizi Ouzou
17:00	Ebossé Bodjongo 6', 32' (pen.)	Report		Stadium: Stade du 1er Novembre 1954; Referee: Redouane Necib

24 May 2014 Round 30	JS Saoura	4–0	CA Bordj Bou Arréridj	Béchar
17:00	M. Mebarki 41'; K. Toubel 65'; Hamzaoui 83'; Bouguelmouna 86'	Report		Stadium: Stade 20 Août 1955; Referee: Boussaid

== Algerian Cup ==
6 December 2013 Round of 64	CS Constantine	1–0	JS Saoura	Constantine
17:00	Boulemdaïs 33'	Repport		Stadium: Stade Mohamed Hamlaoui

== Squad information ==
=== Playing statistics ===
No.	Pos	Nat	Player	Total		Ligue 1		Algerian Cup	
No.	Pos	Nat	Player	Apps	Goals	Apps	Goals	Apps	Goals
Goalkeepers
1	GK	(Algeria) ALG	Ahmed Sefioune	13	0	13	0	0	0
22	GK	(Algeria) ALG	Salah Laouti	5	0	5	0	0	0
24	GK	(Algeria) ALG	Kheireddine Boussouf	13	0	13	0	0	0
Defenders
14	DF	(Algeria) ALG	Djilali Terbah	28	0	28	0	0	0
30	DF	(Algeria) ALG	Touhami Sebie	21	1	21	1	0	0
25	DF	(Algeria) ALG	Khaled Toubal	29	1	29	1	0	0
3	DF	(Mali) MLI	Sekou Bagayoko	27	4	27	4	0	0
4	DF	(Algeria) ALG	Youcef Sabouni	13	0	13	0	0	0
17	DF	(Algeria) ALG	Abdelkader Benmohamed	11	1	11	1	0	0
	DF	(Algeria) ALG	Youcef Bekradja	1	0	1	0	0	0
91	DF	(Algeria) ALG	Omar Mebarki	1	0	1	0	0	0
Midfielders
9	MF	(Algeria) ALG	Saïd Sayah	20	0	20	0	0	0
10	MF	(Algeria) ALG	Kaddour Beldjilali	27	5	27	5	0	0
8	MF	(Algeria) ALG	Mahfoud Amri	25	2	25	2	0	0
13	MF	(Algeria) ALG	Nabil Bousmaha	26	0	26	0	0	0
21	MF	(Algeria) ALG	Abdeljalil Saâd	5	0	5	0	0	0
20	MF	(Algeria) ALG	Abdelmalek Barbari	12	0	12	0	0	0
Forwards
15	FW	(Algeria) ALG	Abdenour Belkheir	25	3	25	3	0	0
90	FW	(Benin) BEN	Mohamed Aoudou	24	10	24	10	0	0
27	FW	(Algeria) ALG	Mohamed Zaoui	29	2	29	2	0	0
38	FW	(Algeria) ALG	Okacha Hamzaoui	24	4	24	4	0	0
26	FW	(Algeria) ALG	Habib Bouguelmouna	10	1	10	1	0	0
11	FW	(Algeria) ALG	Sidi Mohamed Mebarki	19	5	19	5	0	0
	FW	(Algeria) ALG	Kamel Soltani	3	0	3	0	0	0
Players transferred out during the season

Last updated: 9 October 2017
Source: fr.soccerway.com

== Transfers ==
=== In ===
Date	Pos	Player	From club	Transfer fee	Source
1 July 2013	GK	(Algeria) Khaldi Meliani	Reserve team	First Professional Contract	
1 July 2013	DF	(Algeria) Omar Mebarki	Reserve team	First Professional Contract	
1 July 2013	DF	(Algeria) Khaled Toubal	USM Annaba	Free transfer	
1 July 2013	MF	(Algeria) Abdelmalek Barbari	ES Mostaganem	Undisclosed	
1 July 2013	FW	(Algeria) Mohamed Zaoui	MC Saïda	Free transfer	
1 July 2013	FW	(Algeria) Sidi Mohamed Mebarki	IRB Maghnia	Undisclosed	
1 July 2013	FW	(Algeria) Kamel Soltani	JSM Tiaret	Undisclosed	
4 July 2013	GK	(Algeria) Kheireddine Boussouf	CRB Aïn Fakroun	Undisclosed	
12 July 2013	MF	(Algeria) Saïd Sayah	USM Alger	Undisclosed	
31 July 2013	FW	(Benin) Mohamed Aoudou	(Morocco) COD Meknès	Undisclosed	
1 January 2014	MF	(Algeria) Brahim Benmoussa	Reserve team	First Professional Contract	

=== Out ===
Date	Pos	Player	To club	Transfer fee	Source
14 July 2013	DF	(Algeria) Abdelmalek Merbah	JS Kabylie	Free transfer	
