= 2016–17 JS Saoura season =

JS Saoura
2016–17 season
- Owner: Entreprise Nationale de Forage
- President: Mohamed Zerouati
- Head coach: Sébastien Desabre (until 31 August 2016} Salem Laoufi (from September 2016} (until 25 September 2016} Karim Khouda (from 29 September 2016} (until 21 May 2017}
- Stadium: Stade 20 Août 1955
- Ligue 1: 5th
- Algerian Cup: Round of 16
- Champions League: Preliminary round
- Top goalscorer: League: Moustapha Djallit (9); All: Moustapha Djallit (10)

In the 2016–17 season, JS Saoura competed in the Ligue 1 for the 5th season, as well as the Algerian Cup.

== Squad list ==
Players and squad numbers last updated on 18 November 2010.
Note: Flags indicate national team as has been defined under FIFA eligibility rules. Players may hold more than one non-FIFA nationality.

No.	Nat.	Position	Name	Date of birth (age)	Signed from
Goalkeepers
Defenders
Midfielders
Forwards

== Competitions ==
=== Overview ===
Competition	Record							
Competition	G	W	D	L	GF	GA	GD	Win %
Ligue 1	30	12	9	9	34	30	+4	40.00
Algerian Cup	3	1	2	0	3	2	+1	33.33
Champions League	2	0	2	0	1	1	+0	0.00
Total	35	13	13	9	38	33	+5	37.14

Competition	Start round	Final position/round	First match	Last match
Ligue 1	—N/a	5th	20 August 2016	14 June 2017
Algerian Cup	Round of 64	Round of 16	25 November 2016	27 December 2016
CAF Champions League	Preliminary round		10 February 2017	19 February 2017

== League table ==
Pos	Team	Pld	W	D	L	GF	GA	GD	Pts	Qualification or relegation
3	USM Alger	30	14	8	8	50	31	+19	50 (Note: MC Alger ahead of USM Alger on head-to-head record: MCA–UAL 2–1, UAL–MCA 2–2.)	Qualification for the 2018 CAF Confederation Cup
4	USM Bel-Abbès	30	14	6	10	37	33	+4	48	
5	JS Saoura	30	12	9	9	34	30	+4	45	
6	CR Belouizdad	30	12	7	11	30	25	+5	43	Qualification for the 2018 CAF Confederation Cup
7	MC Oran	30	9	13	8	24	25	−1	40 (Note: MC Oran ahead of NA Hussein Dey on head-to-head record: MCO–NAH 1–0, NAH–MCO 1–0 however goal difference in the first leg MCO (+7) NAH (+2).)	

Updated to match(es) played on 14 June 2017. Source: DZFoot
Rules for classification: 1) points; 2) head-to-head points; 3) head-to-head goal difference; 4) goal difference; 5) total goals; 6) fairplay ranking; 7) playoff.

=== Results summary ===
Overall								Home						Away					
Pld	W	D	L	GF	GA	GD	Pts	W	D	L	GF	GA	GD	W	D	L	GF	GA	GD
30	12	9	9	34	30	+4	45	12	3	0	26	7	+19	0	6	9	8	23	−15

Last updated: 30 January 2016.
Source: Competitive matches

=== Results by round ===
Round	1	2	3	4	5	6	7	8	9	10	11	12	13	14	15	16	17	18	19	20	21	22	23	24	25	26	27	28	29	30
Ground	A	H	A	H	A	H	A	H	A	H	A	H	A	A	H	H	A	H	A	H	A	H	A	H	A	H	A	H	H	A
Result	L	W	L	D	L	W	D	W	D	W	L	W	L	D	W	W	L	D	D	W	D	W	D	D	L	W	L	W	W	L
Position	14	10	11	12	14	12	11	8	8	5	7	6	7	7	6	6	7	7	7	7	7	5	6	5	7	5	6	5	4	5

Updated to match(es) played on 30 January 2016. Source: Competitive matches
A = Away; H = Home; W = Win; D = Draw; L = Loss

=== Matches ===
Win Draw Loss

20 August 2016 Round 1	DRB Tadjenanet	2–0	JS Saoura	Tadjenanet
17:30	Aib 77'; Chettal 87'	Soccerway report Live TV: None		Stadium: Lahoua Smaïl Stadium; Referee: Lotfi Bekouassa

27 August 2016 Round 2	JS Saoura	1–0	CS Constantine	Béchar
19:00	Zaidi 22'	Report; Live TV: None		Stadium: Stade 20 Août 1955; Attendance: 0 (close doors); Referee: Mustapha Bessiri

8 September 2016 Round 3	CR Belouizdad	1–0	JS Saoura	Mohamed Belouizdad
19:00	Aoudou 85'	Report; Live TV: None		Stadium: Stade 20 Août 1955; Referee: Abderrezzak Arab

17 September 2016 Round 4	JS Saoura	1–1	Olympique de Médéa	Béchar
19:00	Djallit 69'	Report; Live TV: None	73' Hamia	Stadium: Stade 20 Août 1955; Referee: Mohamed Benouza

24 September 2016 Round 5	RC Relizane	3–0	JS Saoura	Relizane
16:30	Benayad 2', 60'; Anane 22'	Report; Live TV: Canal Algérie		Stadium: Stade Tahar Zoughari; Referee: Sekhraoui Sekhraoui

1 October 2016 Round 6	JS Saoura	1–0	JS Kabylie	Béchar
19:00	Zaidi 60'	Report; Live TV: None		Stadium: Stade 20 Août 1955; Referee: Mohamed Amine Bachir

15 October 2016 Round 7	USM Bel-Abbès	1–1	JS Saoura	Sidi Bel Abbès
17:00	Korbiaa 20'	Report; Live TV: Canal Algérie	90' Bencharif	Stadium: Stade 24 Fevrier 1956; Referee: Rafik Achouri

22 October 2016 Round 8	JS Saoura	4–1	USM El Harrach	Béchar
19:00	Hammia 31' (pen.); Bourdim 39', 59'; Zaidi 90+2'	Report; Live TV: None	33' (pen.) Dahar	Stadium: Stade 20 Août 1955; Referee: Mohamed Benouza

27 October 2016 Round 9	MC Alger	0–0	JS Saoura	Bologhine
17:00		Report; Live TV: beIN Sports / TV Tamazight 4		Stadium: Stade Omar Hamadi; Referee: Farouk Mial

4 November 2016 Round 10	JS Saoura	2–1	NA Hussein Dey	Béchar
19:00	Djallit 40'; Hammia 41'	Report; Live TV: None	90' Hérida	Stadium: Stade 20 Août 1955; Referee: Mohamed Benabdellah

11 November 2016 Round 11	CA Batna	1–0	JS Saoura	Batna
15:00	Aribi 43'	Report; Live TV: None		Stadium: Stade Mustapha Sefouhi; Referee: Lahlou Benbraham

19 November 2016 Round 12	JS Saoura	2–1	ES Sétif	Béchar
19:00	Djallit 41' (pen.); Zaidi 90+3'	Report; Live TV: None	71' Bedrane	Stadium: Stade 20 Août 1955; Referee: Merzak Halalchi

3 December 2016 Round 13	MC Oran	3–1	JS Saoura	Oran
16:00	Bentiba 58'; Chérif 70'; Souibaâh 74'	Report; Live TV: None	10' Bourdim	Stadium: Ahmed Zabana Stadium; Referee: Hamza Bouslimani

9 December 2016 Round 14	MO Béjaïa	1–1	JS Saoura	Béjaïa
16:00	Messadia 1'	Report; Live TV: None	48' Bencharif	Stadium: Stade de l'Unité Maghrébine; Attendance: 0 (close doors); Referee: Lotfi Bekouassa

22 December 2016 Round 15	JS Saoura	1–0	USM Alger	Béchar
19:00	Djallit 66'	Report; Live TV: None		Stadium: August 20, 1955 Stadium; Referee: Said Aouina

21 January 2017 Round 16	JS Saoura	2–1	DRB Tadjenanet	Béchar
18:00	Djallit 50' (pen.), 85'	Report; Live TV: None	90' Djahel	Stadium: August 20, 1955 Stadium; Referee: Mohamed Gritli

27 January 2017 Round 17	CS Constantine	1–0	JS Saoura	Constantine
16:00	Manucho 48'	Report; Live TV: EPTV Terrestre / Algérie 3		Stadium: Stade Mohamed Hamlaoui; Referee: Mohamed Boukhalfa

2 February 2017 Round 18	JS Saoura	1–1	CR Belouizdad	Béchar
18:00	Djallit 5'	Report; Live TV: None	30' (o.g.) Toubal	Stadium: August 20, 1955 Stadium; Referee: Mohamed Benabdellah

7 February 2017 Round 19	Olympique de Médéa	1–1	JS Saoura	Médéa
15:00	Rachedi 49'	Report; Live TV: None	15' Saâd	Stadium: Stade Imam Lyes de Médéa; Referee: Mustapha Ghorbal

31 March 2017 Round 20	JS Saoura	1–0	RC Relizane	Béchar
18:00; Match rescheduled due to JS Saoura competing in the 2017 CAF Champions League	Bellatreche 89'	Report; Live TV: None		Stadium: August 20, 1955 Stadium; Referee: Amine Hansal

25 February 2017 Round 21	JS Kabylie	0–0	JS Saoura	Tizi Ouzou
16:00		Report; Live TV: Algérie 3		Stadium: November 1, 1954 Stadium; Referee: Lahlou Benbraham

4 March 2017 Round 22	JS Saoura	3–0	USM Bel-Abbès	Béchar
18:00	Djallit 24', 39'; Hamia 86'	Report; Live TV: None		Stadium: August 20, 1955 Stadium; Referee: Marzouk Brahimi

11 March 2017 Round 23	USM El Harrach	0–0	JS Saoura	El Harrach
15:00		Report; Live TV: None		Stadium: November 1, 1954 Stadium; Referee: Mohamed Boukhalfa

29 April 2017 Round 24	JS Saoura	0–0	MC Alger	Béchar
19:00		Report; Live TV: None		Stadium: August 20, 1955 Stadium; Referee: Mustapha Ghorbal

7 May 2017 Round 25	NA Hussein Dey	3–2	JS Saoura	Mohamed Belouizdad
16:00	Gasmi 10', 90+3' (pen.); Herida 52'	Report; Live TV: Algérie 3	31' Hammia; 37' Merbah	Stadium: August 20, 1955 Stadium; Referee: Rafik Achouri

13 May 2017 Round 26	JS Saoura	2–1	CA Batna	Béchar
19:00	Bourdim 25' (pen.); Zaidi 40'	Report; Live TV: None	90+2' Dif	Stadium: August 20, 1955 Stadium; Referee: Amine Sekhraoui

20 May 2017 Round 27	ES Sétif	1–0	JS Saoura	Sétif
16:00	Djahnit 85'	Report; Live TV: None		Stadium: Stade 8 Mai 1945; Referee: Abderrezzak Arab

7 June 2017 Round 28	JS Saoura	2–0	MC Oran	Béchar
22:30	Hammia 55'; Saâd 89'	Report; Live TV: None		Stadium: August 20, 1955 Stadium; Referee: Merzoug Brahimi

10 June 2017 Round 29	JS Saoura	3–0 (Note: Match awarded 3-0 by FA decision, the match JS Saoura-MO Béjaia, disputed, did not come to an end after the referee stopped the debates at the 52nd. and for good reason, the Béjaouis had only 6 players valid on the field.)	MO Béjaïa	Béchar
22:30	Saâd 15'; Zaidi 22'; Ghazali 28'	Report; Live TV: None		Stadium: August 20, 1955 Stadium

14 June 2017 Round 30	USM Alger	5–2	JS Saoura	Bologhine
22:30	Darfalou 23', 77', 83'; Benmoussa 60' (pen.); Khoualed 90+3' (pen.)	Report; Live TV: None	43' Bourdim; 86' Bekakchi	Stadium: Omar Hamadi Stadium; Attendance: 0 (close doors); Referee: Mehdi Abid Charef

== Algerian Cup ==
25 November 2016 Round of 64	NC Magra	0–0 (a.e.t.) (5–6 p)	JS Saoura	M'Sila
14:45				Stadium: Chahid Ouartal El Bachir Stadium; Referee: Benzahra, Tizazoua, Athmane

17 December 2016 Round of 32	JS Saoura	1–0	CS Constantine	Béchar
17:00	Bencharif 22'			Stadium: August 20, 1955 Stadium; Referee: Benoura, Omari, Ayad

27 December 2016 Round of 16	ES Sétif	2–2 (a.e.t.) (7–6 p)	JS Saoura	Sétif
17:00	Aït Ouamar 11'; Djabou 76' (pen.)	Live TV: Algérie 3 / Canal Algérie	Hamia 60'; Djallit 65'	Stadium: Stade 8 Mai 1945; Referee: Abid Charef, Hamlaoui, Gourari
	Penalties
	Aït Ouamar (penalty scored); Lamri (penalty missed); Ziti (penalty scored); Bouchar (penalty scored); Djabou (penalty scored); Tembeng (penalty scored); Bekir (penalty scored); Rebiai (penalty scored)		(penalty missed) Djallit; (penalty scored) Bourdim; (penalty scored) Hamia; (penalty scored) Bousmaha; (penalty scored) Bapidi Fils; (penalty scored) Merbah; (penalty scored) Maaziz; (penalty missed) Toubal

== Champions League ==
=== Preliminary round ===
10 February 2017 first leg	JS Saoura (Algeria)	1–1	(Nigeria) Enugu Rangers	Béchar
19:00 UTC+1	Bourdim 32'	Report	Clement 39'	Stadium: Stade 20 Août 1955; Attendance: 20,000; Referee: Maguette N'Diaye (Senegal)

19 February 2017 Second leg	Enugu Rangers (Nigeria)	0–0	(Algeria) JS Saoura	Enugu
16:00 UTC+1		Report		Stadium: Nnamdi Azikiwe Stadium; Referee: Bienvenu Sinko (Ivory Coast)

== Squad information ==
=== Playing statistics ===
No.	Pos	Nat	Player	Total		Ligue 1		Algerian Cup		Champions League	
No.	Pos	Nat	Player	Apps	Goals	Apps	Goals	Apps	Goals	Apps	Goals
Goalkeepers
1	GK	(Algeria) ALG	Houari Djemili	30	0	27	0	1	0	2	0
16	GK	(Algeria) ALG	Salah Laouti	4	0	2	0	2	0	0	0
Defenders
23	DF	(Cameroon) CMR	Jean-Jules Bapidi	33	0	28	0	3	0	2	0
4	DF	(Algeria) ALG	Ibrahim Bekakchi	25	0	22	0	3	0	0	0
5	DF	(Algeria) ALG	Nadjib Maaziz	22	0	18	0	3	0	1	0
3	DF	(Algeria) ALG	Nour El Islam Salah	5	0	4	0	0	0	1	0
15	DF	(Algeria) ALG	Fateh Talah	10	0	10	0	0	0	0	0
24	DF	(Algeria) ALG	Mohamed Tiboutine	16	0	14	0	2	0	0	0
28	DF	(Algeria) ALG	Khaled Toubal	16	0	12	0	2	0	2	0
14	DF	(Algeria) ALG	Farès Aggoune	2	0	0	0	2	0	0	0
Midfielders
22	MF	(Algeria) ALG	Djamel Belalem	10	0	9	0	0	0	1	0
8	MF	(Algeria) ALG	Abderrahmane Bourdim	28	6	23	5	3	0	2	1
13	MF	(Algeria) ALG	Nabil Bousmaha	27	0	24	0	1	0	2	0
26	MF	(Algeria) ALG	Mohamed El Amine Hammia	29	6	25	5	3	1	1	0
6	MF	(Algeria) ALG	Mohamed Lagraâ	17	0	13	0	2	0	2	0
18	MF	(Algeria) ALG	Messala Merbah	32	1	27	1	3	0	2	0
7	MF	(Algeria) ALG	Abdeldjalil Taki Eddine Saâd	14	3	12	3	0	0	2	0
33	MF	(Algeria) ALG	Ibrahim Khalil Saïdi	1	0	1	0	0	0	0	0
10	MF	(Algeria) ALG	Said Sayah	24	0	20	0	3	0	1	0
Forwards
11	FW	(Algeria) ALG	Oussama Bellatreche	14	1	13	1	1	0	0	0
9	FW	(Algeria) ALG	Sofiane Bencharif	21	2	18	1	2	1	1	0
17	FW	(Algeria) ALG	Moustapha Djallit	29	10	25	9	2	1	2	0
27	FW	(Algeria) ALG	Youcef Ghazali	4	1	3	1	0	0	1	0
19	FW	(Algeria) ALG	Hamza Zaidi	33	7	28	7	3	0	2	0
Players transferred out during the season
7	MF	(Algeria) ALG	Mehdi Benaldjia	10	0	9	0	1	0	0	0
14	DF	(Algeria) ALG	Farès Aggoune	2	0	0	0	2	0	0	0

Source: Competitions

== Squad list ==
As of 15 January 2017.

Note: Flags indicate national team as defined under FIFA eligibility rules; some limited exceptions apply. Players may hold more than one non-FIFA nationality.

No.	Pos.	Nation	Player
1	GK	ALG	Houari Djemili
3	DF	ALG	Nour El Islam Salah
4	DF	ALG	Ibrahim Bekakchi
5	DF	ALG	Nadjib Maaziz
6	DF	ALG	Mohamed Lagraâ
7	MF	ALG	Abdeldjalil Taki Eddine Saâd
8	MF	ALG	Abderrahmane Bourdim (on loan from USM Alger)
9	FW	ALG	Sofiane Bencharif
10	MF	ALG	Said Sayah
11	FW	ALG	Oussama Bellatreche
13	MF	ALG	Nabil Bousmaha
15	FW	ALG	Fateh Talah

No.	Pos.	Nation	Player
16	GK	ALG	Salah Laouti
17	FW	ALG	Moustapha Djallit
18	MF	ALG	Messala Merbah
19	FW	ALG	Hamza Zaidi
22	MF	ALG	Djamel Belalem
23	MF	CMR	Jean-Jules Bapidi
24	DF	ALG	Mohamed Tiboutine
26	MF	ALG	Mohamed El Amine Hammia
27	FW	ALG	Youcef Ghazali
28	DF	ALG	Khaled Toubal
29	DF	ALG	Touhami Sebie (captain)
30	GK	ALG	Mohamed Reda Younes

== Transfers ==
=== In ===
No.	Pos.	Nation	Player
8	MF	ALG	Abderrahmane Bourdim (on loan from (Algeria) USM Alger)
4	DF	ALG	Ibrahim Bekakchi (from (Algeria) USM Alger)
14	DF	ALG	Farès Aggoune (from (Algeria) Olympique de Médéa)
7	MF	ALG	Mehdi Benaldjia (from (Algeria) NA Hussein Dey)
3	DF	ALG	Nour El Islam Salah (from (Algeria) JS Kabylie)
9	FW	ALG	Sofiane Bencharif (Unattached)

No.	Pos.	Nation	Player
11	MF	ALG	Oussama Belatrèche (from (Algeria) Youth system)
25	FW	ALG	Yanis Roumadi (from (Italy) SSD Argentina)
—	MF	ALG	Gianni Seraf (from (Spain) CF Vilanova)
26	MF	ALG	Faycal Moundji (from (Algeria) RC Relizane)
35	DF	ALG	Abdelwahed Benmebarek (from (Belgium) Schaerbeek)
15	DF	ALG	Fateh Talah (from (Algeria) CA Batna)
22	MF	ALG	Djamel Belalem (from (Algeria) ASM Oran)
27	FW	ALG	Youcef Ghazali (from (Algeria) USM Bel-Abbès)
7	MF	ALG	Abdeldjalil Taki Eddine Saâd (from (Algeria) MC Saida)

=== Out ===
No.	Pos.	Nation	Player
15	MF	ALG	Ziri Hammar (to (Algeria) USM Alger)
29	DF	ALG	Touhami Sebie (to (Algeria) JS Kabylie)

No.	Pos.	Nation	Player
—	FW	ALG	Abdenour Belkheir (to (Algeria) CS Constantine)
—	DF	ALG	Djilali Terbah (to (Algeria) DRB Tadjenanet)
—	DF	ALG	Farès Aggoune (to (Algeria) RC Relizane)
—	MF	ALG	Mehdi Benaldjia (to (Algeria) JS Kabylie)
