= 2012–13 JS Saoura season =

JS Saoura
2012–13 season
- Owner: Entreprise Nationale de Forage
- President: Mohamed Zerouati
- Head coach: Chérif Hadjar
- Stadium: Stade 20 Août 1955
- Ligue 1: 9th
- Algerian Cup: Round of 64
- Top goalscorer: League: Kaddour Beldjilali (7); All: Kaddour Beldjilali (7)

In the 2012–13 season, JS Saoura competed in the Ligue 1 for the 1st season, as well as the Algerian Cup.

== Squad list ==
Players and squad numbers last updated on 15 September 2012.
Note: Flags indicate national team as has been defined under FIFA eligibility rules. Players may hold more than one non-FIFA nationality.

No.	Nat.	Position	Name	Date of Birth (Age)	Signed from
Goalkeepers
1	(Algeria)	GK	Ahmed Sefioune	10 December 1983 (aged 28)	(Algeria) MC Saida
22	(Algeria)	GK	Salah Laouti	27 October 1980 (aged 31)	(Algeria) Youth system
	(Algeria)	GK	Mohamed Amine Farès	3 January 1989 (aged 23)	(Algeria) Youth system
Defenders
14	(Algeria)	LB	Djilali Terbah	26 July 1988 (aged 24)	(Algeria) USM Blida
30	(Algeria)	CB	Touhami Sebie	3 May 1988 (aged 24)	(Algeria) AS Khroub
21	(Algeria)	CB	Abdelmalek Merbah	19 May 1985 (aged 27)	(Algeria) NA Hussein Dey
3	(Mali)	CB	Sekou Bagayoko	31 December 1987 (aged 24)	(Algeria) MC Saïda
4	(Algeria)	CB	Youcef Sabouni	27 June 1989 (aged 23)	(Algeria) Youth system
17	(Algeria)	RB	Abdelkader Benmohamed	15 February 1983 (aged 29)	(Algeria) Unknown
18	(Algeria)	RB	Youcef Bekradja	24 August 1988 (aged 24)	(Algeria) OM Arzew
Midfielders
10	(Algeria)	AM	Kaddour Beldjilali	28 November 1988 (aged 23)	(Algeria) USM Blida
8	(Algeria)	DM	Mahfoud Amri	3 November 1988 (aged 23)	(Algeria) Unknown
13	(Algeria)	DM	Nabil Bousmaha	2 December 1990 (aged 21)	(Algeria) Youth system
47	(Algeria)	AM	Abdelfettah Bilal Oughliss	29 November 1992 (aged 19)	(Algeria) Unknown
25	(Algeria)	DM	Fatah Fathi	30 November 1984 (aged 27)	(Algeria) Unknown
	(Algeria)	AM	Brahim Benmoussa	11 June 1992 (aged 20)	(Algeria) Youth system
Forwards
	(Niger)	ST	Kamilou Daouda	29 December 1987 (aged 24)	(Tunisia) CS Sfaxien
15	(Algeria)	RW	Abdenour Belkheir	21 February 1989 (aged 23)	(Algeria) USM Blida
27	(Algeria)	LW	Mohamed Abdelaziz Tchikou	14 December 1985 (aged 26)	(Algeria) RC Kouba
7	(Algeria)	LW	Adil Tebbal	23 May 1986 (aged 26)	(Algeria) USM Annaba
	(Algeria)	ST	Okacha Hamzaoui	29 November 1990 (aged 21)	(Algeria) USM Bel-Abbès
	(Ivory Coast)		Josué Alex Aguie	14 June 1987 (aged 25)	(Ivory Coast) ASEC Mimosas
9	(Algeria)		Abdelhak Motrani	24 September 1984 (aged 27)	(Algeria) Unknown
	(Algeria)	ST	Mourad Benayad	25 September 1990 (aged 21)	(Algeria) ES Mostaganem
29	(Algeria)		Zidane Benzaoui	27 January 1988 (aged 24)	(Algeria) Unknown
11	(Algeria)		Khalil Bencherif	29 December 1989 (aged 22)	(Algeria) Unknown
4	(Algeria)		Habib Bouguelmouna	12 December 1988 (aged 23)	(Algeria) USM El Harrach
	(Algeria)		Abdeljalil Saâd	12 March 1992 (aged 20)	(Algeria) MC Saida

== Competitions ==
=== Overview ===
Competition	Record								Started round	Final position / round	First match	Last match
Competition	G	W	D	L	GF	GA	GD	Win %	Started round	Final position / round	First match	Last match
Ligue 1	30	10	8	12	28	26	+2	33.33	—N/a	9th	15 September 2012	21 May 2013
Algerian Cup	1	0	0	1	0	1	−1	0.00	Round of 64		15 December 2012	
Total	31	10	8	13	28	27	+1	32.26				

Updated to match played 9 May 2017
Source: Competitions

== League table ==
Pos	Team	Pld	W	D	L	GF	GA	GD	Pts
7	JS Kabylie	30	11	8	11	32	31	+1	41
8	MC El Eulma	30	9	13	8	29	27	+2	40
9	JS Saoura	30	10	8	12	28	26	+2	38
10	ASO Chlef	30	10	8	12	26	29	−3	38
11	JSM Béjaïa	30	9	11	10	28	32	−4	38

Updated to match(es) played on 21 May 2013. Source: DZFoot
Rules for classification: 1) points; 2) head-to-head points; 3) head-to-head goal difference; 4) goal difference; 5) total goals; 6) fairplay ranking; 7) playoff.

=== Results summary ===
Overall								Home						Away					
Pld	W	D	L	GF	GA	GD	Pts	W	D	L	GF	GA	GD	W	D	L	GF	GA	GD
30	10	8	12	29	23	+6	38	8	3	4	22	8	+14	2	5	8	7	15	−8

Last updated: 21 May 2013.
Source: Competitive matches

=== Results by round ===
Round	1	2	3	4	5	6	7	8	9	10	11	12	13	14	15	16	17	18	19	20	21	22	23	24	25	26	27	28	29	30
Ground	H	A	H	A	H	A	H	A	H	A	H	H	A	H	A	A	H	A	H	A	H	A	H	A	H	A	A	H	A	H
Result	L	L	W	W	W	D	D	D	L	W	L	D	L	W	D	L	W	L	W	L	D	L	W	L	W	D	L	L	D	W
Position	14	14	12	9	4	7	6	8	11	7	9	10	10	8	9	10	8	10	7	9	9	10	9	9	7	8	9	10	10	9

Source: Competitive matches
A = Away; H = Home; W = Win; D = Draw; L = Loss

=== Matches ===
15 September 2012 Round 1	JS Saoura	0–1	CR Belouizdad	Béchar
16:00		Report	87' Slimani	Stadium: Stade 20 Août 1955; Referee: Mohamed Bachir

18 September 2012 Round 2	MC Alger	1–0	JS Saoura	Algiers
17:45	Djallit 90+3'	Report		Stadium: Stade 5 Juillet 1962; Referee: Boubekeur Zouaoui

22 September 2012 Round 3	JS Saoura	2–1	JS Kabylie	Béchar
16:00	Tchikou 7'; Merbah 64'	Report	55' Bencherifa	Stadium: Stade 20 Août 1955; Referee: Rafik Achouri

29 September 2012 Round 4	CA Bordj Bou Arréridj	0–1	JS Saoura	Bordj Bou Arréridj
18:00		Report	3' Beldjilali	Stadium: Stade 20 Août 1955; Referee: Mokhtar Amalou

6 October 2012 Round 5	JS Saoura	1–0	ES Sétif	Béchar
16:00	Oughliss 61'	Report		Stadium: Stade 20 Août 1955; Referee: Mohamed Ghorbal

16 October 2012 Round 6	MC El Eulma	1–1	JS Saoura	El Eulma
18:00	Tiaïba 1' (pen.)	Report	46' Amri	Stadium: Stade Messaoud Zougar; Referee: Mohamed Benouza

20 October 2012 Round 7	JS Saoura	0–0	CS Constantine	Béchar
15:00		Report		Stadium: Stade 20 Août 1955; Referee: Mohamed Saïdi

23 October 2012 Round 8	CA Batna	0–0	JS Saoura	Batna
16:00		Report		Stadium: November 1, 1954 Stadium; Referee: Djamel Haimoudi

3 November 2012 Round 9	JS Saoura	0–3 (Note: Match was suspended in 67th minute at 1-2 due to riots on the terraces; match awarded 0-3.)	USM El Harrach	Béchar
15:00		Report		Stadium: Stade 20 Août 1955; Referee: Mehdi Abid Charef

9 November 2012 Round 10	WA Tlemcen	0–1	JS Saoura	Tlemcen
16:00		Report	14' (pen.) Beldjilali	Stadium: Stade Akid Lotfi; Referee: Mohamed Ghorbal

17 November 2012 Round 11	JS Saoura	0–1	USM Alger	Béchar
15:00		Report	Boudebouda 90'	Stadium: Stade 20 Août 1955; Attendance: 0 (close doors); Referee: Redouane Necib

24 November 2012 Round 12	JS Saoura	1–1	ASO Chlef	Béchar
15:00	Beldjilali 53'	Report	58' (pen.) Messaoud	Stadium: Stade 20 Août 1955; Attendance: 0 (close doors); Referee: Farouk Houasnia

1 December 2012 Round 13	MC Oran	1–0	JS Saoura	Oran
18:00	Sandaogo 49'	Report		Stadium: Ahmed Zabana Stadium; Referee: Abderrazek Hallalchi

8 December 2012 Round 14	JS Saoura	3–0	JSM Béjaïa	Béchar
15:00	Metrani 4'; Beldjilali 46', 90+2'	Report		Stadium: Stade 20 Août 1955; Referee: Mokhtar Amalou

22 December 2012 Round 15	USM Bel-Abbès	0–0	JS Saoura	Sidi Bel Abbès
15:00		Report		Stadium: Stade 24 Fevrier 1956; Referee: Mohamed Bichari

15 January 2013 Round 16	CR Belouizdad	2–1	JS Saoura	Belouizdad
15:00	Benaldjia 12'; Amroune 56'	Report	19' Tebbal	Stadium: Stade 20 Août 1955; Referee: Mohamed Ghorbal

19 January 2013 Round 17	JS Saoura	2–0	MC Alger	Béchar
15:00	Bouguelmouna 47'; Benmohamed 63'	Report		Stadium: Stade 20 Août 1955; Referee: Mohamed Saïdi

26 January 2013 Round 18	JS Kabylie	2–0	JS Saoura	Tizi Ouzou
15:00	Chalali 23'; Maïza 73'	Report		Stadium: Stade 1er Novembre 1954; Referee: Mehdi Abid Charef

2 February 2013 Round 19	JS Saoura	2–0	CA Bordj Bou Arréridj	Béchar
15:00	Beldjilali 29'; Belkheir 51'	Report		Stadium: Stade 20 Août 1955; Referee: Youssef Zerrouki

9 February 2013 Round 20	ES Sétif	1–0	JS Saoura	Sétif
18:00	Nadji 90+2'	Report		Stadium: Stade 8 Mai 1945; Referee: Abderrezzak Arab

16 February 2013 Round 21	JS Saoura	1–1	MC El Eulma	Béchar
15:00	Bouguelmouna 2'	Report	87' Derrardja	Stadium: Stade 20 Août 1955; Referee: Ali Nader

23 February 2013 Round 22	CS Constantine	2–1	JS Saoura	Constantine
15:00	Tiaiba 45'; Bezzaz 82'	Report	90+5' Daouda	Stadium: Stade Mohamed Hamlaoui; Referee: Merzak Halalchi

9 March 2013 Round 23	JS Saoura	2–0	CA Batna	Béchar
15:00	Terbah 10'; Beldjilali 52'	Report		Stadium: Stade 20 Août 1955; Referee: Mohamed Ghorbal

19 March 2013 Round 24	USM El Harrach	2–1	JS Saoura	Algiers
18:00	Belkaroui 35'; Belkaroui 65' (pen.)	Report	49' (pen.) Sebie	Stadium: Stade 1er Novembre 1954; Referee: Rafik Achouri

6 April 2013 Round 25	JS Saoura	2–0	WA Tlemcen	Béchar
16:00	Bagayoko 16'; Hamzaoui 44'	Report		Stadium: Stade 20 Août 1955; Referee: Okacha Hamzaoui

27 April 2013 Round 26	USM Alger	0–0	JS Saoura	Algiers
18:00		Report		Stadium: Stade Omar Hamadi; Referee: Mohamed Bachir

4 May 2013 Round 27	ASO Chlef	2–0	JS Saoura	Chlef
17:00	Youcef 25'; Farhi 67'	Report		Stadium: Stade Mohamed Boumezrag; Referee: Merzoug Brahimi

11 May 2013 Round 28	JS Saoura	2–3	MC Oran	Béchar
17:00	Metrani 81', 89'	Report	5' Benyettou; 12' Dagoulou; 33' Achiou	Stadium: Stade 20 Août 1955; Referee: Farouk Houasnia

14 May 2013 Round 29	JSM Béjaïa	1–1	JS Saoura	Béjaïa
17:00	Bangoura 56'	Report	55' Hamzaoui	Stadium: Stade de l'Unité Maghrébine; Referee: Mokhtar Amalou

21 May 2013 Round 30	JS Saoura	3–0	USM Bel-Abbès	Béchar
17:00	Bagayoko 30'; Khali 61' (o.g.); Hamzaoui 80'	Report		Stadium: Stade 20 Août 1955; Referee: Boussaid

== Algerian Cup ==
15 December 2012 Round of 64	JS Saoura	0–1	USM Alger	Béchar
14:00		Report	90+1' Chafaï	Stadium: Stade 20 Août 1955; Referee: Boubekeur Zouaoui

== Squad information ==
=== Playing statistics ===
No.	Pos	Nat	Player	Total		Ligue 1		Algerian Cup	
No.	Pos	Nat	Player	Apps	Goals	Apps	Goals	Apps	Goals
Goalkeepers
1	GK	(Algeria) ALG	Ahmed Sefioune	21	0	20	0	1	0
22	GK	(Algeria) ALG	Salah Laouti	10	0	10	0	0	0
	GK	(Algeria) ALG	Mohamed Amine Farès	2	0	2	0	0	0
Defenders
14	DF	(Algeria) ALG	Djilali Terbah	28	1	27	1	1	0
30	DF	(Algeria) ALG	Touhami Sebie	19	1	18	1	1	0
21	DF	(Algeria) ALG	Abdelmalek Merbah	15	1	15	1	0	0
3	DF	(Mali) MLI	Sekou Bagayoko	29	2	28	2	1	0
4	DF	(Algeria) ALG	Youcef Sabouni	15	0	14	0	1	0
17	DF	(Algeria) ALG	Abdelkader Benmohamed	26	1	25	1	1	0
18	DF	(Algeria) ALG	Youcef Bekradja	12	0	12	0	0	0
Midfielders
10	MF	(Algeria) ALG	Kaddour Beldjilali	30	7	29	7	1	0
8	MF	(Algeria) ALG	Mahfoud Amri	30	1	29	1	1	0
13	MF	(Algeria) ALG	Nabil Bousmaha	29	0	28	0	1	0
47	MF	(Algeria) ALG	Abdelfettah Bilal Oughliss	8	1	8	1	0	0
25	MF	(Algeria) ALG	Fatah Fathi	11	0	11	0	0	0
	MF	(Algeria) ALG	Abdeljalil Saâd	3	0	3	0	0	0
Forwards
	FW	(Niger) NIG	Kamilou Daouda	3	1	3	1	0	0
15	FW	(Algeria) ALG	Abdenour Belkheir	31	1	30	1	1	0
27	FW	(Algeria) ALG	Mohamed Abdelaziz Tchikou	26	1	25	1	1	0
7	FW	(Algeria) ALG	Adil Tebbal	18	1	17	1	1	0
	FW	(Algeria) ALG	Okacha Hamzaoui	13	3	13	3	0	0
	FW	(Ivory Coast) CIV	Josué Alex Aguie	2	0	2	0	0	0
9	FW	(Algeria) ALG	Abdelhak Motrani	20	3	19	3	1	0
	FW	(Algeria) ALG	Mourad Benayad	12	0	12	0	0	0
29	FW	(Algeria) ALG	Zidane Benzaoui	4	0	4	0	0	0
11	FW	(Algeria) ALG	Khalil Bencherif	5	0	5	0	0	0
4	FW	(Algeria) ALG	Habib Bouguelmouna	6	2	6	2	0	0
	FW	(Algeria) ALG	Brahim Benmoussa	1	0	1	0	0	0
Players transferred out during the season

Last updated: 1 December 2017
Source: fr.soccerway.com

=== Goalscorers ===
Includes all competitive matches. The list is sorted alphabetically by surname when total goals are equal.

No.	Nat.	Player	Pos.	Ligue 1	Algerian Cup	TOTAL
10	(Algeria)	Kaddour Beldjilali	MF	7	0	7
?	(Algeria)	Okacha Hamzaoui	FW	3	0	3
9	(Algeria)	Abdelhak Motrani	FW	3	0	3
4	(Algeria)	Habib Bouguelmouna	FW	2	0	2
3	(Mali)	Sekou Bagayoko	DF	2	0	2
14	(Algeria)	Djilali Terbah	DF	1	0	1
30	(Algeria)	Touhami Sebie	DF	1	0	1
21	(Algeria)	Abdelmalek Merbah	DF	1	0	1
17	(Algeria)	Abdelkader Benmohamed	DF	1	0	1
8	(Algeria)	Mahfoud Amri	MF	1	0	1
47	(Algeria)	Abdelfettah Bilal Oughliss	MF	1	0	1
?	(Niger)	Kamilou Daouda	FW	1	0	1
15	(Algeria)	Abdenour Belkheir	FW	1	0	1
27	(Algeria)	Mohamed Abdelaziz Tchikou	FW	1	0	1
Own Goals				2	0	2
Totals				28	0	28

== Transfers ==
=== In ===
Date	Pos	Player	From club	Transfer fee	Source
1 July 2012	DF	(Mali) Sekou Bagayoko	MC Saïda	Undisclosed	
1 July 2012	DF	(Algeria) Abdelmalek Merbah	NA Hussein Dey	Undisclosed	
1 July 2012	DF	(Algeria) Touhami Sebie	AS Khroub	Undisclosed	
1 July 2012	DF	(Algeria) Youcef Bekradja	OM Arzew	Undisclosed	
1 July 2012	MF	(Algeria) Abdeljalil Saâd	Reserve team	First Professional Contract	
1 July 2012	FW	(Algeria) Adil Tebbal	USM Annaba	Undisclosed	
1 July 2012	FW	(Algeria) Mohamed Abdelaziz Tchikou	RC Kouba	Undisclosed	
1 July 2012	FW	(Algeria) Abdenour Belkheir	USM Blida	Undisclosed	
1 July 2012	FW	(Ivory Coast) Josué Alex Aguie	(Ivory Coast) ASEC Mimosas	Undisclosed	
5 December 2012	FW	(Niger) Kamilou Daouda	Unattached	Free transfer	
12 January 2013	FW	(Algeria) Habib Bouguelmouna	USM El Harrach	Undisclosed	
12 January 2013	FW	(Algeria) Okacha Hamzaoui	USM Bel-Abbès	Undisclosed	
