= 2014–15 JS Saoura season =

JS Saoura
2014–15 season
- Owner: Entreprise Nationale de Forage
- President: Mohamed Zerouati
- Head coach: Alain Michel (until 3 September 2014} El Hadi Khezzar (from 4 September 2014} (until 15 November 2014} Denis Goavec (from 17 November 2014} (until 3 February 2015} Mohamed Belhafiane (c) (from 4 February 2015} (until 25 February 2015} Mohamed Henkouche (from 26 February 2015}
- Stadium: Stade 20 Août 1955
- Ligue 1: 11th
- Algerian Cup: Round of 64
- Top goalscorer: League: Mohamed Aoudou (5); Saïd Sayah (5); All: Mohamed Aoudou (5); Saïd Sayah (5)

In the 2014–15 season, JS Saoura competed in the Ligue 1 for the 3rd season, as well as the Algerian Cup. On February 24, 2015, Mustapha Kouici was appointed as the club's general manager for a period of 18 months, Kouici has pledged to put his experience and knowledge at the disposal of the team for the sole purpose of putting it on the right track.

== Squad list ==
Players and squad numbers last updated on 18 November 2010.
Note: Flags indicate national team as has been defined under FIFA eligibility rules. Players may hold more than one non-FIFA nationality.

No.	Nat.	Position	Name	Date of birth (age)	Signed from
Goalkeepers
85	(Algeria)	GK	Nassim Benkhodja	2 February 1985 (aged 29)	(Algeria) CA Bordj Bou Arréridj
1	(Algeria)	GK	Khairi Barki	12 December 1990 (aged 23)	(Algeria) CRB Aïn Fakroun
-	(Algeria)	GK	Salah Laouti	27 October 1980 (aged 33)	
Defenders
-	(Algeria)	RB	Mohamed Achref Aib	24 May 1990 (aged 24)	
17	(Algeria)	RB	Abdelkader Benmohamed	15 February 1983 (aged 31)	
-	(Algeria)	RB	Mostefa Khaldi	25 June 1993 (aged 21)	Youth system
30	(Algeria)	RB	Touhami Sebie	3 May 1988 (aged 26)	(Algeria) AS Khroub
-	(Algeria)	RB	Khaled Toubal	28 June 1986 (aged 28)	(Algeria) USM Annaba
73	(Cameroon)	RB	Jean Jules Bapidi Fils	8 March 1989 (aged 25)	(Saudi Arabia) Al Orubah
-	(Algeria)	RB	Omar Benzerga	13 March 1990 (aged 24)	(Belgium) Royal Mouscron-Péruwelz
-	(Algeria)	RB	Youcef Mekdad	19 May 1993 (aged 21)	Youth system
-	(Algeria)	RB	Djilali Terbah	26 July 1988 (aged 26)	(Algeria) USM Blida
Midfielders
13	(Algeria)	CM	Nabil Bousmaha	2 December 1990 (aged 23)	Youth system
-	(Algeria)	CM	Saïd Sayah	21 July 1989 (aged 25)	(Algeria) WA Tlemcen
8	(Algeria)	CM	Mahfoud Amri	3 November 1988 (aged 25)	
-	(Algeria)	CM	Mohamed El Amine Hammia	21 December 1991 (aged 22)	(Algeria) USM Blida
-	(Algeria)	CM	Amine El Amali	29 April 1988 (aged 26)	(Algeria) USM El Harrach
-	(Algeria)	CM	Mohamed El Amine Tiouli	8 July 1987 (aged 27)	(Algeria) ES Sétif
-	(Algeria)	CM	Messala Merbah		Youth system
Forwards
-	(France) (Algeria)	RW	Hakeem Achour	31 May 1989 (aged 25)	(France) Étoile Fréjus Saint-Raphaël
15	(Algeria)	RW	Abdenour Belkheir	21 February 1989 (aged 25)	(Algeria) USM Blida
11	(Cameroon)	RW	Donald Dering Djousse	18 March 1990 (aged 24)	(Poland) Pogoń Szczecin
90	(Benin)	RW	Mohamed Aoudou	30 November 1989 (aged 24)	(Morocco) COD Meknès
47	(Algeria)	RW	Souleiman Djabour	2 October 1988 (aged 25)	(France) AS Lyon-Duchère
-	(Algeria)	RW	Mohamed Zaoui	10 September 1986 (aged 27)	(Algeria) MC Saïda

== Competitions ==
=== Overview ===
Competition	Record								Started round	Final position / round	First match	Last match
Competition	G	W	D	L	GF	GA	GD	Win %	Started round	Final position / round	First match	Last match
Ligue 1	30	10	9	11	26	29	−3	33.33	—N/a	11th	16 August 2014	29 May 2015
Algerian Cup	1	0	1	0	1	1	+0	0.00	Round of 64	Round of 64	12 December 2014	
Total	31	10	10	11	27	30	−3	32.26				

=== Ligue 1 ===
==== League table ====
Pos	Team	Pld	W	D	L	GF	GA	GD	Pts
9	NA Hussein Dey	30	10	10	10	23	22	+1	40 (Note: NAHD 3-0 RCA; RCA 0-1 NAHD)
10	RC Arbaâ	30	12	4	14	28	35	−7	40
11	JS Saoura	30	10	9	11	26	29	−3	39 (Note: JSS: 9 points; MCA: 6 points; JSK: 3 points)
12	MC Alger	30	10	9	11	33	31	+2	39
13	JS Kabylie	30	11	6	13	35	35	0	39

Updated to match(es) played on 29 May 2015. Source: DZFoot
Rules for classification: 1) points; 2) head-to-head points; 3) head-to-head goal difference; 4) goal difference; 5) total goals; 6) fairplay ranking; 7) playoff

==== Results summary ====
Overall								Home						Away					
Pld	W	D	L	GF	GA	GD	Pts	W	D	L	GF	GA	GD	W	D	L	GF	GA	GD
0	0	0	0	0	0	0	0	0	0	0	0	0	0	0	0	0	0	0	0

Last updated: 29 December 2014.
Source: Competitive matches

==== Results by round ====
Round	1	2	3	4	5	6	7	8	9	10	11	12	13	14	15	16	17	18	19	20	21	22	23	24	25	26	27	28	29	30
Ground	A	A	H	A	H	A	H	A	H	A	H	A	H	A	H	H	H	A	H	A	H	A	H	A	H	A	H	A	H	A
Result	D	D	W	L	L	W	W	L	L	D	D	L	W	D	W	D	L	L	W	L	W	L	W	D	D	L	W	D	W	L
Position	11	13	4	9	13	9	5	7	10	12	12	14	11	11	8	10	11	13	11	12	11	12	11	11	12	13	11	9	7	11

Updated to match(es) played on 29 December 2014. Source: Competitive matches
A = Away; H = Home; W = Win; D = Draw; L = Loss

==== Matches ====
16 August 2014 1	ASO Chlef	0–0	JS Saoura	Chlef
19:00		Report		Stadium: Stade Mohamed Boumezrag; Referee: Boukouassa, Bounoua, Bourouba

23 August 2014 2	MO Béjaïa	1–1	JS Saoura	Béjaïa
19:00	Zerdab 62'	Report	42' Djousse	Stadium: Stade de l'Unité Maghrébine; Referee: Hallalchi, Brahim, Doulache

13 September 2014 3	JS Saoura	3–1	ASM Oran	Béchar
16:30	Benzerga 8'; Boucherit 11' (pen.); Bousmaha 34'	Report	26' Aouad	Stadium: Stade 20 Août 1955; Referee: Zouaoui, Bitam, Aouina

20 September 2014 4	MC Alger	2–1	JS Saoura	Algiers
17:45	Sylla 43'; Aksas 82'	Report	42' El Amali	Stadium: Stade Omar Hammadi; Referee: Achouri, Amri, Bouguerara

1 October 2014 6	JS Kabylie	0–1	JS Saoura	Algiers
17:00		Report	87' Amri	Stadium: Stade 20 Août 1955; Attendance: 0 (close doors); Referee: Boukhalfa, Benali Zerhouni

18 October 2014 7	JS Saoura	1–0	USM El Harrach	Béchar
15:00	Sayah 15'	Report		Stadium: Stade 20 Août 1955; Referee: Bouchama, Bourahli, Saadi

25 October 2014 8	RC Arbaâ	2–1	JS Saoura	Larbaâ
15:00	Darfalou 12'; Guessan 87'	Report	11' Aoudou	Stadium: Stade Ismaïl Makhlouf; Referee: Nader, Messali, Belhocine

1 November 2014 9	JS Saoura	2–1	CR Belouizdad	Béchar
15:00	Sebie 67' (pen.)	Report	70' Djediat; 90+1' Rebih	Stadium: Stade 20 Août 1955; Referee: Aouina, Benaïssa T., Chenoua

8 November 2014 10	CS Constantine	0–0	JS Saoura	Constantine
18:00		Report		Stadium: Stade Mohamed Hamlaoui; Referee: Bouslimani, Rimouche, Belbachir

14 November 2014 5	JS Saoura	1–2	ES Sétif	Béchar
15:00	Djousse 48'	Report	33' Gasmi; 71' Younès	Stadium: Stade 20 Août 1955; Referee: Mial, Idir, Semsoum

22 November 2014 11	JS Saoura	0–0	MC Oran	Béchar
15:00		Report		Stadium: Stade 20 Août 1955

29 November 2014 12	USM Alger	3–1	JS Saoura	Algiers
18:00	Baïteche 46'; Nadji 48' (yellow card) 67'; Meziane 90+3'; Koudri (yellow card) 62'	Report	76' Hammia; (yellow card) 31' El Amali; (yellow card) 74' Aoudou	Stadium: Stade Omar Hammadi; Attendance: 14.000; Referee: Abid Charef, Boulfelfel, Tamen

6 December 2014 13	JS Saoura	1–0	MC El Eulma	Béchar
15:00	Sayah 48' (pen.)	Report		Stadium: Stade 20 Août 1955; Referee: Bichari, Gourari, Selouati

20 December 2014 14	USM Bel-Abbès	1–1	JS Saoura	Sidi Bel Abbès
16:00	Achiou 38'	Report	7' Aoudou	Stadium: Stade 24 Fevrier 1956; Referee: Amalou, Azrine, Bourouba

30 December 2014 15	JS Saoura	1–0	NA Hussein Dey	Béchar
14:30	Sayah 58' (pen.)	Report		Stadium: Stade 20 Août 1955; Referee: Aouina, Benaïssa, Chenaoua

20 January 2015 16	JS Saoura	0–0	ASO Chlef	Béchar
15:00		Report		Stadium: Stade 20 Août 1955; Referee: Arab, Bazzine, Bioudh

24 January 2015 17	JS Saoura	0–1	MO Béjaïa	Béchar
15:00		Report	90+4' Chatal	Stadium: Stade 20 Août 1955; Referee: Benouza, Aomari, Ayad

31 January 2015 18	ASM Oran	1–0	JS Saoura	Oran
16:00	Benkablia 25'	Report		Stadium: Stade Ahmed Zabana; Referee: Bekouassa, Bounoua, Rachedi

6 February 2015 19	JS Saoura	2–1	MC Alger	Béchar
15:00	Tiouli 8'; Aoudou 55'	Report	81' Aouedj	Stadium: Stade 20 Août 1955; Referee: Boukhalfa, Zerhouni, Ayad

14 February 2014 20	ES Setif	3–0	JS Saoura	Sétif
15:00	Ziaya 25' (pen.), 61', 86'	Report		Stadium: Stade 8 Mai 1945; Referee: Aouina, Benaïssa, Chenaoua

28 February 2015 21	JS Saoura	2–1	JS Kabylie	Béchar
15:00	Aoudou 5'; Sayah 47'	Report	35' Si Ammar	Stadium: Stade 20 Août 1955; Attendance: 0 (close doors); Referee: Bessiri, Tichiali, Hallam

7 March 2015 22	USM El Harrach	1–0	JS Saoura	Algiers
15:00	Boumechra 30'	Report		Stadium: Stade 1er Novembre 1954; Referee: Abid Charef, Tamen, Boulfelfel

21 March 2015 23	JS Saoura	2–1	RC Arbaâ	Béchar
15:00	Sayah 18' (pen.); Terbah 68'	Report	62' Darfalou	Stadium: Stade 20 Août 1955; Referee: Nadher, Serradj, Rezgane

28 March 2015 24	CR Belouizdad	1–1	JS Saoura	Algiers
16:00	Rebih 45'	Report	54' Aoudou	Stadium: Stade 20 Août 1955; Referee: Mial, Idir, Semsoum

17 April 2015 25	JS Saoura	1–1	CS Constantine	Béchar
16:00	Tiouli 45'	Report	43' (pen.) Boucherit	Stadium: Stade 20 Août 1955; Referee: Bekouassa, Bourouba, Rachedi

25 April 2015 26	MC Oran	1–0	JS Saoura	Oran
17:00	Berradja 9'	Report		Stadium: Stade Ahmed Zabana; Referee: Helalchi, Badache, Azraine

9 May 2015 27	JS Saoura	3–2	USM Alger	Béchar
17:00	Tiouli 5'; El Amali 63'; Sebie 73' (pen.) (yellow card) 25' (yellow-red card) 90+2'	Report; Live TV: None	9' Bouchema; 70' (o.g.) Jean Bapidi; (yellow card) 45' (yellow-red card) 72' Khoualed	Stadium: Stade 20 Août 1955; Attendance: 0 (close doors); Referee: Benouza, Amari, Ayad

16 May 2015 28	MC El Eulma	0–0	JS Saoura	El Eulma
17:00		Report		Stadium: Stade Messaoud Zougar; Attendance: 0 (close doors); Referee: Houasnia, Itchiali, Serradj

23 May 2015 29	JS Saoura	1–0	USM Bel-Abbès	Béchar
17:00	Bapidi Fils 75' (pen.)	Report		Stadium: Stade 20 Août 1955; Referee: Bichari, Gourari, Salhaouadji

29 May 2015 30	NA Hussein Dey	1–0	JS Saoura	Algiers
17:00	Khellaf 60'	Report		Stadium: Stade 20 Août 1955; Referee: Abid Charef, Boulfelfel, Tamen

== Algerian Cup ==
12 December 2014 Round of 64	MO Béjaïa	1–1 (a.e.t.) (4–3 p)	JS Saoura	Béjaïa
16:00	Okacha Hamzaoui 90'	Repport	33' Jean Bapidi	Stadium: Stade de l'Unité Maghrébine; Attendance: 0 (close doors); Referee: Ghorbal, Serradj, Charchar

== Squad information ==
=== Goalscorers ===
Includes all competitive matches. The list is sorted alphabetically by surname when total goals are equal.

No.	Nat.	Player	Pos.	L 1	AC	TOTAL
90	(Benin)	Mohamed Aoudou	FW	5	0	5
-	(Algeria)	Saïd Sayah	MF	5	0	5
-	(Algeria)	Mohamed El Amine Tiouli	MF	3	0	3
11	(Cameroon)	Donald Dering Djousse	FW	2	0	2
-	(Algeria)	Amine El Amali	MF	2	0	2
30	(Algeria)	Touhami Sebie	DF	2	0	2
73	(Cameroon)	Jean Jules Bapidi Fils	DF	1	1	2
8	(Algeria)	Mahfoud Amri	MF	1	0	1
-	(Algeria)	Omar Benzerga	DF	1	0	1
13	(Algeria)	Nabil Bousmaha	MF	1	0	1
-	(Algeria)	Djilali Terbah	DF	1	0	1
Own Goals				2	0	2
Totals				26	1	27
