= 2020–21 CA Bordj Bou Arreridj season =

CA Bordj Bou Arreridj
2020–21 season
- Head coach: Billel Dziri (until 9 January 2021)
- Stadium: Stade 20 Août 1955
- Ligue 1: 19th
- League Cup: Preliminary round
- Top goalscorer: League: Noufel Lalaoui (4 goals); All: Noufel Lalaoui (4 goals)
- Highest home attendance: 0 (Note: no one can attend games due to the COVID-19 pandemic)
- Lowest home attendance: 0 (Note: no one can attend games due to the COVID-19 pandemic)
- Average home league attendance: 0 (Note: no one can attend games due to the COVID-19 pandemic)

In the 2020–21 season, CA Bordj Bou Arreridj is competing in the Ligue 1 for the 16th season, and the League Cup. It is their 3rd consecutive season in the top flight of Algerian football.

== Squad list ==
Players and squad numbers last updated on 15 November 2020.
Note: Flags indicate national team as has been defined under FIFA eligibility rules. Players may hold more than one non-FIFA nationality.

No.	Nat.	Position	Name	Date of Birth (Age)	Signed from
Goalkeepers
1	(Algeria)	GK	Abdeselem Naili	12 December 1997 (aged 23)	(Algeria) JSM Tiaret
16	(Algeria)	GK	Cédric Si Mohamed	9 January 1985 (aged 35)	(Algeria) CR Belouizdad
27	(Algeria)	GK	Oussama Methazem	16 December 1993 (aged 27)	(Algeria) USM Khenchela
Defenders
2	(Algeria)	LB	Takfarinas Ouchène	28 October 1993 (aged 27)	(Algeria) RC Relizane
3	(Algeria)	CB	Nasser Maddour	6 August 1990 (aged 30)	(Algeria) JSM Béjaïa
4	(Algeria)	CB	Ramzi Adala	6 November 1993 (aged 27)	(Algeria) USM Sétif
5	(Algeria)	CB	Said Arroussi	7 April 1990 (aged 30)	(Algeria) CS Constantine
6	(Algeria)	LB	Yakoub Boudjema	10 September 1999 (aged 21)	(Algeria) Youth system
15	(Algeria)	CB	Mohamed Hammouche	21 April 1995 (aged 25)	(Saudi Arabia) Al-Qaisumah FC
18	(Algeria)	CB	Touhami Sebie	3 May 1988 (aged 32)	(Algeria) JS Kabylie
20	(Algeria)	RB	Oussama Guettal	14 May 1997 (aged 23)	(Algeria) USM Blida
26	(Algeria)	LB	Toufik Zeghdane	17 September 1992 (aged 28)	(Algeria) JS Kabylie
Midfielders
8	(Algeria)	RW	Abdellah Daouadji	9 July 1995 (aged 25)	(Algeria) JS Saoura
10	(Algeria)		Houd Rahmani	8 March 1998 (aged 22)	(Algeria) Youth system
11	(Algeria)	AM	Islam Rachedi	9 May 1998 (aged 22)	(Algeria) Unknown
13	(Algeria)	DM	Nabil Bousmaha	2 December 1990 (aged 30)	(Algeria) NA Hussein Dey
19	(Algeria)	DM	Ahmed Gagaa	15 January 1994 (aged 26)	(Algeria) CS Constantine
23	(Algeria)	DM	Ali Amriche	8 December 1998 (aged 22)	(Algeria) OM Arzew
25	(Algeria)	AM	Salaheddine Rahba	10 April 1998 (aged 22)	(Algeria) ES Sétif
Forwards
7	(Algeria)		Akram Berrouche	21 January 1995 (aged 25)	(Algeria) SA Sétif
9	(Algeria)	LW	Mansour Benothmane	10 August 1997 (aged 23)	(Algeria) MC Alger
12	(Algeria)	LW	Billel Ziani	23 June 1988 (aged 32)	(Algeria) NC Magra
14	(Algeria)		Younes Belferoum	25 March 1999 (aged 21)	(Algeria) CA Bordj Bou Arreridj
17	(Algeria)	LW	Iheb Guessas	20 May 1997 (aged 23)	(Algeria) SA Sétif
21	(Algeria)	RW	Sofiane Fouad Lachahab	12 July 1999 (aged 21)	(Algeria) Youth system

== Competitions ==
=== Overview ===
Competition	Record								Started round	Final position / round	First match	Last match
Competition	G	W	D	L	GF	GA	GD	Win %	Started round	Final position / round	First match	Last match
Ligue 1	38	4	10	24	29	67	−38	10.53	—N/a	19th	27 November 2020	24 August 2021
League Cup	1	0	1	0	0	0	+0	0.00	Preliminary round		16 April 2021	
Total	39	4	11	24	29	67	−38	10.26				

Updated to match played 24 August 2021
Source: Competitions

== League table ==
Pos	Team	Pld	W	D	L	GF	GA	GD	Pts	Qualification or relegation
16	ASO Chlef	38	12	9	17	39	53	−14	45	
17	AS Aïn M'lila (R)	38	13	8	17	38	53	−15	44 (Note: On May 30, 2021 after the participation of a penalized player Hamza Ziad against JS Kabylie, AS Ain M'lila Lost the match 3–0 and deducted 3 points.)	Relegation to Ligue 2
18	USM Bel Abbès (R)	38	9	11	18	32	58	−26	38	Relegation to Ligue 2
19	CA Bordj Bou Arréridj (R)	38	4	10	24	29	67	−38	22	Relegation to Ligue 2
20	JSM Skikda (R)	38	5	3	30	17	73	−56	18	Relegation to Ligue 2

Updated to match(es) played on 28 August 2021. Source: dzfoot.com
Rules for classification: 1) points; 2) head-to-head points; 3) head-to-head goal difference; 4) goal difference; 5) total goals; 6) fairplay ranking; 7) playoff.
(R) Relegated

=== Results summary ===
Overall								Home						Away					
Pld	W	D	L	GF	GA	GD	Pts	W	D	L	GF	GA	GD	W	D	L	GF	GA	GD
38	4	10	24	29	67	−38	22	4	5	10	16	29	−13	0	5	14	13	38	−25

Last updated: 24 August 2021.
Source: Competitive matches

=== Results by round ===
Round	1	2	3	4	5	6	7	8	9	10	11	12	13	14	15	16	17	18	19	20	21	22	23	24	25	26	27	28	29	30	31	32	33	34	35	36	37	38
Ground																																						
Result	D	D	L	L	L	L	L	L	L	D	L	L	D	L	L	L	D	L	L	D	D	W	D	W	W	L	W	L	D	L	L	L	L	L	L	L	L	D
Position	14	12	15	18	18	19	20	20	20	20	20	20	20	20	20	20	20	20	20	20	20	20	20	20	19	19	19	19	19	19	19	19	19	19	19	19	19	19

Updated to match(es) played on 24 August 2021. Source: Competitive matches
A = Away; H = Home; W = Win; D = Draw; L = Loss

=== Matches ===
On 22 October 2020, the Algerian Ligue Professionnelle 1 fixtures were announced.

27 November 2020 Round 1	JS Kabylie	0–0	CA Bordj Bou Arreridj	Tizi Ouzou
16:00		Soccerway report		Stadium: Stade 1er Novembre 1954; Attendance: 0 (close doors); Referee: Nabil Boukhalfa

4 December 2020 Round 2	CA Bordj Bou Arreridj	1–1	USM Bel Abbès	Bordj Bou Arréridj
14:00	Gattal 70'	Soccerway report	Abbas 45+1'	Stadium: Stade 20 Août 1955; Attendance: 0 (close doors); Referee: Hamza Bouslimani

11 December 2020 Round 3	JSM Skikda	1–0	CA Bordj Bou Arreridj	Skikda
14:00	Khennab 68'	Soccerway report		Stadium: Stade 20 Août 1955; Attendance: 0 (close doors); Referee: Lahlou Benbraham

18 December 2020 Round 4	CA Bordj Bou Arreridj	0–1	RC Relizane	Bordj Bou Arréridj
15:00		Soccerway report	Chadli 49'	Stadium: Stade 20 Août 1955; Attendance: 0 (close doors); Referee: Hamza Boucetta

23 December 2020 Round 5	Paradou AC	3–2	CA Bordj Bou Arreridj	Dar El Beïda
14:30	Guenaoui 48'; Zorgane 73' (pen.); Kismoun 90+2'	Soccerway report	Gattal 11'; Ziani 45'	Stadium: Omar Benrabah Stadium; Attendance: 0 (close doors); Referee: Ali Nader

27 December 2020 Round 6	AS Ain M'lila	1–0	CA Bordj Bou Arreridj	Aïn M'lila
15:00	Demane 75'	Soccerway report		Stadium: Touhami Zoubir Khelifi Stadium; Attendance: 0 (close doors); Referee: Abdelmoumen Touabti

9 January 2021 Round 7	CA Bordj Bou Arreridj	1–5	ES Sétif	Bordj Bou Arréridj
14:30	Rahba 52'	Soccerway report	Laouafi 16' (pen.); Ghacha 40', 48' (pen.); Amoura 45'; Touré 84'	Stadium: Stade 20 Août 1955; Attendance: 0 (close doors); Referee: Lotfi Bekouassa

15 January 2021 Round 8	ASO Chlef	2–0	CA Bordj Bou Arreridj	Chlef
14:30	Meharzi 90+3'; Tahar 90+9'	Soccerway report		Stadium: Stade Mohamed Boumezrag; Attendance: 0 (close doors); Referee: Abderrezzak Arab

22 January 2021 Round 9	CA Bordj Bou Arreridj	0–1	USM Alger	Bordj Bou Arréridj
15:00		Soccerway report	Koudri 29'	Stadium: Stade 20 Août 1955; Attendance: 0 (close doors); Referee: Houssam Benyahia

26 January 2021 Round 10	US Biskra	1–1	CA Bordj Bou Arreridj	Biskra
14:30	Salem 52'	Soccerway report	Maddour 68' (pen.)	Stadium: Stade du 18 Février; Attendance: 0 (close doors); Referee: Hamza Boucetta

30 January 2021 Round 11	CA Bordj Bou Arreridj	1–2	NA Hussein Dey	Bordj Bou Arréridj
15:00	Maddour 55' (pen.)	Soccerway report	Bennai 39'; Meftah 90+2'	Stadium: Stade 20 Août 1955; Attendance: 0 (close doors); Referee: Redouane Necib

7 February 2021 Round 12	JS Saoura	2–0	CA Bordj Bou Arreridj	Béchar
15:00	Yahia-Chérif 39', 74'	Soccerway report		Stadium: Stade 20 Août 1955; Attendance: 0 (close doors); Referee: Bilal Bendjahene

13 February 2021 Round 13	CA Bordj Bou Arreridj	2–2	NC Magra	Bordj Bou Arréridj
14:30	Lachahab 46'; Zeghdane 79'	Soccerway report	Hainikoye 23'; Demane 67'	Stadium: Stade 20 Août 1955; Attendance: 0 (close doors); Referee: Ahmed Bouzrar

20 February 2021 Round 14	WA Tlemcen	3–1	CA Bordj Bou Arreridj	Tlemcen
15:00	Touil 48', 57'; Asli 79'	Soccerway report	Rahba 90+3'	Stadium: Stade Akid Lotfi; Attendance: 0 (close doors); Referee: Youcef Gamouh

13 March 2021 Round 17	MC Oran	1–1	CA Bordj Bou Arreridj	Oran
15:00	Mellel 90+2'	Soccerway report	Rahmani 38'	Stadium: Ahmed Zabana Stadium; Attendance: 0 (close doors); Referee: Houssam Benyahia

17 March 2021 Round 18	CA Bordj Bou Arreridj	0–3	CS Constantine	Bordj Bou Arréridj
15:00		Soccerway report	Amrane 5'; Belmessaoud 36'; Lamri 71'	Stadium: Stade 20 Août 1955; Attendance: 0 (close doors); Referee: Lyés Bekouassa

21 March 2021 Round 19	Olympique de Médéa	2–1	CA Bordj Bou Arreridj	Médéa
15:00	Baâli 34'; Kemoukh 79'	Soccerway report	Guessas 58'	Stadium: Stade Imam Lyes; Attendance: 0 (close doors); Referee: Amine Sekhraoui

20 April 2021 Round 15	CA Bordj Bou Arreridj	1–3	CR Belouizdad	Bordj Bou Arréridj
22:30	Gagaa 27' (pen.)	Soccerway report	Nessakh 8'; Sayoud 21'; Belahouel 40'	Stadium: Stade 20 Août 1955; Attendance: 0 (close doors); Referee: Ahmed Bouzrar

25 April 2021 Round 16	CA Bordj Bou Arreridj	0–2	MC Alger	Bordj Bou Arréridj
22:30		Soccerway report	Bourdim 68'; Addadi 85'	Stadium: Stade 20 Août 1955; Attendance: 0 (close doors); Referee: Abdelmoumen Touabti

4 May 2021 Round 20	CA Bordj Bou Arreridj	1–1	JS Kabylie	Bordj Bou Arréridj
22:30	Benothmane 44'	Soccerway report	Bensayah 68'	Stadium: Stade 20 Août 1955; Attendance: 0 (close doors); Referee: Hamza Bouslimani

16 May 2021 Round 21	USM Bel Abbès	1–1	CA Bordj Bou Arreridj	Sidi Bel Abbès
17:00	Mouaki 45+4'	Soccerway report	Belferoum 77'	Stadium: Stade 24 Fevrier 1956; Attendance: 0 (close doors); Referee: Lahreche

22 May 2021 Round 22	CA Bordj Bou Arreridj	1–0	JSM Skikda	Bordj Bou Arréridj
17:00	Ziani 40'	Soccerway report		Stadium: Stade 20 Août 1955; Attendance: 0 (close doors); Referee: Youcef Taieb Bouderbal

26 May 2021 Round 23	RC Relizane	1–1	CA Bordj Bou Arréridj	Relizane
17:00	Nekrouf 45+2' (pen.)	Soccerway report	Lalaoui 43'	Stadium: Stade Tahar Zoughari; Attendance: 0 (close doors); Referee: Lyés Bekouassa

30 May 2021 Round 24	CA Bordj Bou Arreridj	3–2	Paradou AC	Bordj Bou Arréridj
17:00	Rahba 30' (pen.); Amriche 52'; Hammouche 87'	Soccerway report	Benayad 33'; Bouzok 60'	Stadium: Stade 20 Août 1955; Attendance: 0 (close doors); Referee: Youcef Gamouh

10 June 2021 Round 25	CA Bordj Bou Arreridj	2–0	AS Ain M'lila	Bordj Bou Arréridj
17:00	Lachahab 84'; Saïdi 90+4'	Soccerway report		Stadium: Stade 20 Août 1955; Attendance: 0 (close doors); Referee: Hamza Bouslimani

20 June 2021 Round 26	ES Sétif	2–0	CA Bordj Bou Arreridj	Sétif
17:45	Ghacha 45' (pen.); Djahnit 80' (pen.)	Soccerway report		Stadium: Stade 8 Mai 1945; Attendance: 0 (close doors); Referee: Lotfi Bekouassa

26 June 2021 Round 27	CA Bordj Bou Arreridj	1–0	ASO Chlef	Bordj Bou Arréridj
17:00	Daouadji 72'	Soccerway report		Stadium: Stade 20 Août 1955; Attendance: 0 (close doors); Referee: Ahmed Bouzrar

1 July 2021 Round 28	USM Alger	3–1	CA Bordj Bou Arreridj	Bologhine
20:00	Opoku 17'; Hamra 57'; Belkacemi 78'	Soccerway report	Lalaoui 19'	Stadium: Omar Hamadi Stadium; Attendance: 0 (close doors); Referee: Malek Ait Ameur

4 July 2021 Round 29	CA Bordj Bou Arreridj	0–0	US Biskra	Bordj Bou Arréridj
19:00		Soccerway report		Stadium: Stade 20 Août 1955; Attendance: 0 (close doors); Referee: Mohamed Amine Benzohra

8 July 2021 Round 30	NA Hussein Dey	3–0	CA Bordj Bou Arreridj	Belouizdad
18:00	Benayad 62', 81' (pen.); Yaya 85'	Soccerway report		Stadium: Stade 20 Août 1955; Attendance: 0 (close doors); Referee: Mahdi Dehina

13 July 2021 Round 31	CA Bordj Bou Arreridj	0–1	JS Saoura	Bordj Bou Arréridj
20:30		Soccerway report	Amrane 46'	Stadium: Stade 20 Août 1955; Attendance: 0 (close doors); Referee: Dafri

17 July 2021 Round 32	NC Magra	3–0	CA Bordj Bou Arreridj	Magra
17:45	Ziouache 10'; Benkablia 16'; Righi 76'	Soccerway report		Stadium: Boucheligue Brothers Stadium; Attendance: 0 (close doors); Referee: Amine Hansal

23 July 2021 Round 33	CA Bordj Bou Arreridj	0–1	WA Tlemcen	Bordj Bou Arréridj
17:45		Soccerway report	Nezouani 90+1'	Stadium: Stade 20 Août 1955; Attendance: 0 (close doors); Referee: Hamza Boucetta

27 July 2021 Round 34	CR Belouizdad	1–0	CA Bordj Bou Arreridj	Belouizdad
17:45	Merzougui 48'	Soccerway report		Stadium: Stade 20 Août 1955; Attendance: 0 (close doors); Referee: Abdellah Benchehida

9 August 2021 Round 35	MC Alger	3–0	CA Bordj Bou Arreridj	Dar El Beïda
17:30	Esso 2'; Abdelhafid 51', 54'	Soccerway report		Stadium: Omar Benrabah Stadium; Attendance: 0 (close doors); Referee: Abdenacer Baatouche

16 August 2021 Round 36	CA Bordj Bou Arreridj	0–2	MC Oran	Bordj Bou Arréridj
17:30		Soccerway report	Freifer 30'; Chaouti 45+4' (pen.)	Stadium: Stade 20 Août 1955; Attendance: 0 (close doors); Referee: Anes Azrine

21 August 2021 Round 37	CS Constantine	5–4	CA Bordj Bou Arreridj	Constantine
17:30	Bendaoud 21'; Dib 44'; Lakdja 46'; Bouldjedri 70', 89'	Soccerway report	Amriche 17'; Belferkous 62' (pen.); Guessas 66'; Lalaoui 90+3'	Stadium: Stade Ramdane Benabdelmalek; Attendance: 0 (close doors); Referee: Bouchaker

24 August 2021 Round 38	CA Bordj Bou Arreridj	2–2	Olympique de Médéa	Bordj Bou Arréridj
17:30	Lalaoui 7'; Ziani 38'	Soccerway report	Boudoumi 4'; Mokrani 45'	Stadium: Stade 20 Août 1955; Attendance: 0 (close doors); Referee: Daas

== Algerian League Cup ==
16 April 2021 Preliminary round	CA Bordj Bou Arréridj	0–0 (a.e.t.) (2–3 p)	MC Oran	Bordj Bou Arréridj
22:30		Report		Stadium: Stade 20 Août 1955; Attendance: 0 (close doors); Referee: Youcef Gamouh
	Penalties
	Sebie (penalty missed); Hammouche (penalty scored); Bousmaha (penalty missed); Rahba (penalty scored); Gagaâ (penalty missed)		(penalty scored) Ezzemani; (penalty missed) Bentiba; (penalty scored) Guertil; (penalty scored) Fourloul
Note: Lineup for CA Bordj Bou Arréridj - Si Mohamed, Sebie, Belferoum, Hammouche, Zeghdane (Berrouche, 106'), Zeghdane, Zeghnoun (Rahba, 89'), Daouadji (Guessas, 74'), Benothmane (Bousmaha, 74'), Saidi, Ziani (Bordji, 106').

== Squad information ==
=== Playing statistics ===
No.	Pos	Nat	Player	Total		Ligue 1		League Cup	
No.	Pos	Nat	Player	Apps	Goals	Apps	Goals	Apps	Goals
Goalkeepers
1	GK	(Algeria) ALG	Abdeselem Naili	0	0	0	0	0	0
16	GK	(Algeria) ALG	Cédric Si Mohamed	0	0	0	0	0	0
27	GK	(Algeria) ALG	Oussama Methazem	0	0	0	0	0	0
Defenders
2	DF	(Algeria) ALG	Takfarinas Ouchène	0	0	0	0	0	0
3	DF	(Algeria) ALG	Nasser Maddour	0	0	0	0	0	0
4	DF	(Algeria) ALG	Ramzi Adala	0	0	0	0	0	0
5	DF	(Algeria) ALG	Said Arroussi	0	0	0	0	0	0
6	DF	(Algeria) ALG	Yakoub Boudjema	0	0	0	0	0	0
15	DF	(Algeria) ALG	Mohamed Hammouche	0	0	0	0	0	0
18	DF	(Algeria) ALG	Touhami Sebie	0	0	0	0	0	0
20	DF	(Algeria) ALG	Oussama Guettal	0	0	0	0	0	0
26	DF	(Algeria) ALG	Toufik Zeghdane	0	0	0	0	0	0
Midfielders
8	MF	(Algeria) ALG	Abdellah Daouadji	0	0	0	0	0	0
10	MF	(Algeria) ALG	Houd Rahmani	0	0	0	0	0	0
11	MF	(Algeria) ALG	Islam Rachedi	0	0	0	0	0	0
13	MF	(Algeria) ALG	Nabil Bousmaha	0	0	0	0	0	0
19	MF	(Algeria) ALG	Ahmed Gagaa	0	0	0	0	0	0
23	MF	(Algeria) ALG	Ali Amriche	0	0	0	0	0	0
25	MF	(Algeria) ALG	Salaheddine Rahba	0	0	0	0	0	0
Forwards
7	FW	(Algeria) ALG	Akram Berrouche	0	0	0	0	0	0
9	FW	(Algeria) ALG	Mansour Benothmane	0	0	0	0	0	0
12	FW	(Algeria) ALG	Billel Ziani	0	0	0	0	0	0
14	FW	(Algeria) ALG	Younes Belferoum	0	0	0	0	0	0
17	FW	(Algeria) ALG	Iheb Guessas	0	0	0	0	0	0
21	FW	(Algeria) ALG	Sofiane Fouad Lachahab	0	0	0	0	0	0
Players transferred out during the season

Last updated: 11 June 2018
Source: fr.soccerway.com

=== Goalscorers ===
Includes all competitive matches. The list is sorted alphabetically by surname when total goals are equal.

No.	Nat.	Player	Pos.	L 1	LC	TOTAL
	(Algeria)	Noufel Lalaoui	FW	4	0	4
25	(Algeria)	Salaheddine Rahba	MF	3	0	3
12	(Algeria)	Billel Ziani	FW	3	0	3
20	(Algeria)	Oussama Guettal	DF	2	0	2
3	(Algeria)	Nasser Maddour	DF	2	0	2
23	(Algeria)	Ali Amriche	MF	2	0	2
17	(Algeria)	Iheb Guessas	FW	2	0	2
21	(Algeria)	Sofiane Fouad Lachahab	FW	2	0	2
	(Algeria)	Laïd Saïdi	FW	1	0	1
9	(Algeria)	Mansour Benothmane	FW	1	0	1
14	(Algeria)	Younes Belferoum	FW	1	0	1
19	(Algeria)	Ahmed Gagaa	MF	1	0	1
8	(Algeria)	Abdellah Daouadji	MF	1	0	1
10	(Algeria)	Houd Rahmani	MF	1	0	1
26	(Algeria)	Toufik Zeghdane	DF	1	0	1
15	(Algeria)	Mohamed Hammouche	DF	1	0	1
	(Algeria)	Adem Belferkous	?	1	0	1
Own Goals				0	0	0
Totals				29	0	29

== Transfers ==
=== In ===
Date	Pos	Player	From club	Transfer fee	Source
18 October 2020	MF	(Algeria) Salaheddine Rahba	ES Sétif	Free transfer	
18 October 2020	DF	(Algeria) Toufik Zeghdane	JS Kabylie	Free transfer	
18 October 2020	MF	(Algeria) Bassem Nedjmeddine Charama	ES Sétif	Free transfer	
20 October 2020	FW	(Algeria) Mansour Benothmane	ASO Chlef	Free transfer	
22 October 2020	DF	(Algeria) Takfarinas Ouchène	RC Relizane	Free transfer	

=== Out ===
Date	Pos	Player	To club	Transfer fee	Source
13 August 2020	MF	(Ivory Coast) Isla Daoudi Diomande	MC Alger	Free transfer	
6 September 2020	FW	(Algeria) Mehdi Derrouache	JS Saoura	Free transfer	
16 September 2020	DF	(Algeria) Mohamed Amrane	JS Saoura	Free transfer	
25 September 2020	GK	(Algeria) Zakaria Bouhalfaya	NC Magra	Free transfer	
6 October 2020	MF	(Algeria) Mohamed El Amine Belmokhtar	USM Bel Abbès	Free transfer	
9 October 2020	FW	(Algeria) Tawfiq Elghomari	Olympique de Médéa	Free transfer	
16 November 2020	FW	(Sudan) Mohamed Abderrahmane Al Ghorbal	(Sudan) Al-Hilal Club	Undisclosed	
