= 2019–20 ASO Chlef season =

ASO Chlef
2019–20 season
- Chairman: Mohamed Ouahab
- Head coach: Samir Zaoui (from 17 July 2019)
- Stadium: Stade Mohamed Boumezrag
- Ligue 1: 12th
- Algerian Cup: Round of 16
- Top goalscorer: Mohamed Boulaouidet (3 goals)
Home colours	Away colours

In the 2019–20 season, ASO Chlef is competing in the Ligue 1 for the 29th season, as well as the Algerian Cup. On March 15, 2020, the Ligue de Football Professionnel (LFP) decided to halt the season due to the COVID-19 pandemic in Algeria. On July 29, 2020, the LFP declared that season is over and CR Belouizdad to be the champion, the promotion of four teams from the League 2, and scraping the relegation for the current season.

== Squad list ==
Players and squad numbers last updated on 15 November 2019.
Note: Flags indicate national team as has been defined under FIFA eligibility rules. Players may hold more than one non-FIFA nationality.

No.	Nat.	Position	Name	Date of birth (age)	Signed from
Goalkeepers
1	(Algeria)	GK	Mohamed Amine Sahnoun	6 July 1994 (aged 25)	(Algeria) JSM Tiaret
16	(Algeria)	GK	Walid Ouabdi	12 June 1995 (aged 24)	(Algeria) IRB Maghnia
30	(Algeria)	GK	Abdelghani Hamel	16 February 1998 (aged 21)	(Algeria) Youth system
Defenders
5	(Algeria)	CB	Oussama Rahali	31 July 1992 (aged 27)	(Algeria) MO Constantine
14	(Algeria)		Braim Ladraâ	21 August 1985 (aged 34)	(Algeria)
20	(Algeria)	LB	Aissa Seddiq Larbi	18 August 1997 (aged 22)	(Algeria) Youth system
22	(Algeria)	RB	Farouk Benmaarouf	1 January 1997 (aged 23)	(Algeria) Youth system
24	(Algeria)	CB	Mohamed Roufid Arab	24 July 1990 (aged 29)	(Algeria)
25	(Algeria)	RB	Kheireddine Benamrane	8 July 1994 (aged 25)	(Algeria) USM Aïn Beïda
26	(Algeria)	LB	Abdelkader Kaibou	12 September 1997 (aged 22)	(Algeria) Youth system
27	(Algeria)	LB	Khalfallah Belhaoua	8 November 1988 (aged 31)	(Algeria) CA Batna
12	(Mali)	CB	Massiré Dembélé	18 October 1992 (aged 27)	(Algeria) Olympique de Médéa
Midfielders
3	(Algeria)	DM	Brahim Benzaza	8 April 1997 (aged 22)	(Algeria) ES Mostaganem
6	(Algeria)		Omar Embarek	11 November 1998 (aged 21)	(Algeria) Youth system
7	(Algeria)	AM	Mohamed Bengrina	24 March 1996 (aged 23)	(Algeria) USM Alger
13	(Algeria)	AM	Walid Hellal	1 August 1994 (aged 25)	(Algeria) RC Relizane
15	(Algeria)	AM	Fawzi Benhamla	19 January 1989 (aged 30)	(Algeria) US Biskra
18	(Algeria)	AM	Mostapha Alili	30 November 1996 (aged 23)	(Algeria) JSM Tiaret
19	(Algeria)	AM	Islam Merili	27 June 1998 (aged 21)	(Algeria) Youth system
28	(Algeria)		Abdelhak Messaoudi	16 March 1995 (aged 24)	(Algeria) MC Alger
29	(Algeria)	DM	Abdelkader Boussaid	19 March 1992 (aged 27)	(Algeria) Youth system
5	(Algeria)	AM	Kaddour Beldjilali	28 November 1988 (aged 31)	(Algeria) JS Saoura
Forwards
2	(Algeria)		Chaker Kaddour Chérif	8 February 1997 (aged 22)	(Algeria) USM Alger
8	(Algeria)		Féth-Allah Tahar	22 January 1994 (aged 25)	(Algeria) RC Relizane
9	(Algeria)	LW	Mansour Benothmane	7 August 1997 (aged 22)	(Algeria) MC Alger
10	(Algeria)	LW	Mohamed Benkablia	2 February 1993 (aged 26)	(Algeria) CR Belouizdad
17	(Algeria)		Abdelouahab Djahel	24 April 1985 (aged 34)	(Algeria) DRB Tadjenanet
21	(Algeria)	RW	Hadj Habib Saïd Fellahi	20 March 1997 (aged 22)	(Algeria) ES Mostaganem
31	(Mauritania)		Mohamed Salem Mohamed	23 May 1999 (aged 20)	(Kuwait) Burgan SC
	(Ghana)		Rahim Osumanu	22 May 1995 (aged 24)	(Zambia) Mufulira Wanderers
	(Algeria)		Mohamed Boulaouidet	2 May 1990 (aged 29)	(Sudan) Al-Hilal Club

== Pre-season ==
July 2019 Friendly	ASO Chlef	1–2	JSM Skikda	Aïn Draham, Tunisia
		Report		Stadium: ?

July 2019 Friendly	ASO Chlef	1–0	RC Arbaâ	Aïn Draham, Tunisia
		Report		Stadium: ?

== Competitions ==
=== Overview ===
Competition	Record								Started round	Final position / round	First match	Last match
Competition	G	W	D	L	GF	GA	GD	Win %	Started round	Final position / round	First match	Last match
Ligue 1	21	6	7	8	15	17	−2	28.57	—N/a	12th	15 August 2019	7 March 2020
Algerian Cup	3	2	0	1	9	3	+6	66.67	Round of 64	Round of 32	26 December 2019	3 March 2020
Total	24	8	7	9	24	20	+4	33.33				

Updated to match played 3 June 2019
Source: Competitions

== League table ==
Pos	Team	Pld	W	D	L	GF	GA	GD	Pts	PPG
10	Paradou AC	20	7	5	8	20	18	+2	26	1.30
11	USM Bel Abbès	21	8	2	11	22	31	−9	26	1.24
12	ASO Chlef	21	6	7	8	15	17	−2	25	1.19
13	CA Bordj Bou Arreridj	22	6	7	9	22	29	−7	25	1.14
14	US Biskra	22	6	3	13	17	33	−16	21	0.95

Updated to match(es) played on 15 March 2020. Source: dzfoot.com
Rules for classification: 1) points; 2) head-to-head points; 3) head-to-head goal difference; 4) goal difference; 5) total goals; 6) fairplay ranking; 7) playoff.

=== Results summary ===
Overall								Home						Away					
Pld	W	D	L	GF	GA	GD	Pts	W	D	L	GF	GA	GD	W	D	L	GF	GA	GD
21	6	7	8	15	17	−2	25	3	6	2	8	7	+1	3	1	6	7	10	−3

Last updated: 22 April 2018.
Source: Competitive matches

=== Results by round ===
Round	1	2	3	4	5	6	7	8	9	10	11	12	13	14	15	16	17	18	19	20	21	22	23	24	25	26	27	28	29	30
Ground	A	H	A	H	A	A	H	A	H	A	H	A	H	A	H	H	A	H	A	H	H	A	H	A	H	A	H	A	H	A
Result	L	D	L	W	L	L	L	W	D	L	W	D	D	W	D	D	W	W	L	L	D	C	C	C	C	C	C	C	C	C
Position																						12	12	12	12	12	12	12	12	12

Updated to match(es) played on 22 April 2019. Source: Competitive matches
A = Away; H = Home; W = Win; D = Draw; L = Loss

=== Matches ===
Win Draw Loss

15 August 2019 Round 1	NC Magra	1–0	ASO Chlef	Sétif (Note: NC Magra played their home match against ASO Chlef at Stade 8 Mai 1945, Sétif, instead of their regular stadium Boucheligue Brothers Stadium, Magra, due to renovation.)
20:00	Boulaïnceur 36'	Soccerway report		Stadium: Stade 8 Mai 1945; Attendance: 0 (close doors); Referee: Mehdi Abid Charef

24 August 2019 Round 2	ASO Chlef	0–0	NA Hussein Dey	Chlef
20:00		Soccerway report		Stadium: Stade Mohamed Boumezrag; Attendance: 0 (close doors); Referee: Redouane Necib

30 August 2019 Round 3	US Biskra	1–0	ASO Chlef	Biskra
20:00	Benachour 69' (pen.)	Soccerway report		Stadium: Stade du 18 Février; Referee: Amine Sekhraoui

24 September 2019 Round 5	Paradou AC	1–0	ASO Chlef	Bologhine
17:00	Zorgane 32'	Soccerway report		Stadium: Omar Hamadi Stadium; Referee: Mustapha Bessiri

5 October 2019 Round 7	ASO Chlef	0–1	USM Bel Abbès	Chlef
18:45		Soccerway report	Benamrane 10' (o.g.)	Stadium: Stade Mohamed Boumezrag; Referee: Youcef Gamouh

12 October 2019 Round 4	ASO Chlef	1–0	JS Kabylie	Chlef
17:45	Djahel 22'	Soccerway report		Stadium: Stade Mohamed Boumezrag; Referee: Yazid Ibrir

23 October 2019 Round 8	ES Sétif	0–1	ASO Chlef	Sétif
18:00		Soccerway report	Tahar 16'	Stadium: Stade 8 Mai 1945; Referee: Houssam Benyahia

30 October 2019 Round 9	ASO Chlef	1–1	CS Constantine	Chlef
18:00	Benkablia 90+2'	Soccerway report	Abid 81'	Stadium: Stade Mohamed Boumezrag; Referee: Amine Sekhraoui

9 November 2019 Round 10	AS Ain M'lila	1–0	ASO Chlef	Aïn M'lila
15:00	Tiaiba 52' (pen.)	Soccerway report		Stadium: Touhami Zoubir Khelifi Stadium; Referee: Hamza Boucetta

16 November 2019 Round 6	CR Belouizdad	1–0	ASO Chlef	Belouizdad
16:00	Sayoud 67'	Soccerway report		Stadium: Stade 20 Août 1955; Referee: Ahmed Bouzrar

23 November 2019 Round 11	ASO Chlef	2–1	MC Alger	Chlef
16:00	Benamrane 20'; Benhamla 82' (pen.)	Soccerway report	Frioui 61'	Stadium: Stade Mohamed Boumezrag; Referee: Malek Ait Ameur

30 November 2019 Round 12	JS Saoura	0–0	ASO Chlef	Béchar
18:00		Soccerway report		Stadium: Stade 20 Août 1955; Referee: Redouane Necib

16 December 2019 Round 14	MC Oran	1–2	ASO Chlef	Oran
17:00	Mellal 41'	Soccerway report	Djahel 45'; Hellal 48'	Stadium: Ahmed Zabana Stadium; Referee: Hamza Bouslimani

21 December 2019 Round 15	ASO Chlef	0–0	CA Bordj Bou Arreridj	Chlef
17:00		Soccerway report		Stadium: Stade Mohamed Boumezrag; Referee: Youcef Gamouh

20 January 2020 Round 13	ASO Chlef	0–0	USM Alger	Chlef
17:00		Soccerway report		Stadium: Stade Mohamed Boumezrag; Referee: Abderrezzak Arab

1 February 2020 Round 16	ASO Chlef	0–0	NC Magra	Chlef
17:45		Soccerway report		Stadium: Stade Mohamed Boumezrag; Referee: Mohamed Saïdi

8 February 2020 Round 17	NA Hussein Dey	0–3	ASO Chlef	Belouizdad
15:00		Soccerway report	Boulaouidet 33'; Bengrina 47'; Hellal 89'	Stadium: Stade 20 Août 1955; Referee: Abdelmoumen Touabti

17 February 2020 Round 18	ASO Chlef	2–1	US Biskra	Chlef
17:00	Arab 44'; Boulaouidet 63'	Soccerway report	Mokhtar 23'	Stadium: Stade Mohamed Boumezrag; Referee: Mohamed Boutaraa

22 February 2020 Round 19	JS Kabylie	4–1	ASO Chlef	Tizi Ouzou
16:00	Belgherbi 13'; Bensayah 24'; Bencherifa 55'; Al-Tubal 74'	Soccerway report	Boulaouidet 43'	Stadium: Stade 1er Novembre 1954; Referee: Amine Sekhraoui

27 February 2020 Round 20	ASO Chlef	0–1	Paradou AC	Chlef
17:00		Soccerway report	Kadri 63'	Stadium: Stade Mohamed Boumezrag; Referee: Farouk Mial

7 March 2020 Round 21	ASO Chlef	2–2	CR Belouizdad	Chlef
16:00	Benamrane 41'; Belhaoua 71'	Soccerway report	Sayoud 60'; Nessakh 63'	Stadium: Stade Mohamed Boumezrag; Attendance: 0 (close doors); Referee: Houssam Benyahia

16 March 2020 Round 22	USM Bel Abbès	Cancelled	ASO Chlef	Sidi Bel Abbès
16:00		Soccerway report		Stadium: Stade 24 Fevrier 1956; Attendance: 0 (close doors); Referee: Hamza Boucetta
Note: Match was postponed due to coronavirus pandemic.

Round 23	ASO Chlef	Cancelled	ES Sétif	Chlef
				Stadium: Stade Mohamed Boumezrag

Round 24	CS Constantine	Cancelled	ASO Chlef	Constantine
				Stadium: Stade Mohamed Hamlaoui

Round 25	ASO Chlef	Cancelled	AS Aïn M'lila	Chlef
				Stadium: Stade Mohamed Boumezrag

Round 26	MC Alger	Cancelled	ASO Chlef	Algiers
				Stadium: July 5, 1962 Stadium

Round 27	ASO Chlef	Cancelled	JS Saoura	Chlef
				Stadium: Stade Mohamed Boumezrag

Round 28	USM Alger	Cancelled	ASO Chlef	Bologhine
				Stadium: Omar Hamadi Stadium

Round 29	ASO Chlef	Cancelled	MC Oran	Chlef
				Stadium: Stade Mohamed Boumezrag

Round 30	CA Bordj Bou Arreridj	Cancelled	ASO Chlef	Bordj Bou Arréridj
				Stadium: August 20, 1955 Stadium

== Algerian Cup ==
26 December 2019 Round of 64	ASO Chlef	6–1	US Béni Douala	Chlef
14:00	Djahel 35'; Benothmane 39', 53', 75'; Alili 59'; Fellahi 80'	Report	Abaazezane 90+2' (pen.)	Stadium: Stade Mohamed Boumezrag; Referee: Maâskri, Hadji, Zarouki
Note: Lineup for ASO Chlef - Ouabdi, Benamrane, Dembélé, Kaibou, Boussaid (Embarek 77’), Belhaoua, Benhamla, Djahel (Fellahi 60’), Ladraâ (Arab 38’), Alili, Benothmane

2 January 2020 Round of 32	ASO Chlef	3–1 (a.e.t.)	IR Boumedfaa	Chlef
14:00	Arab 29', 119' (pen.); Fellahi 107'	Report	Meziane 67'	Stadium: Stade Mohamed Boumezrag; Referee: Hamza Bouslimani
Note: Lineup for ASO Chlef - Ouabdi, Benmaarouf, Larbi, Arab, Ladraâ, Benzaza, Benhamla, Tahar (Fellahi 78’), Alili (Boussaid 91’), Kaibou (Djahel 61’), Benothmane (Benkablia 68’)

3 March 2020 Round of 16	ASM Oran	1–0	ASO Chlef	Oran
14:00	Hitala 45'	Report		Stadium: Habib Bouakeul Stadium; Referee: Amine Hansal
Note: Lineup for ASO Chlef - Ouabdi, Benamrane, Belhaoua, Ladraâ, Dembélé, Benzaza, Boussaid, Alili (Kaddour Chérif 59’), Fellahi, Benothmane (Fettouhi 52’), Hellal (Arab 82’).

== Squad information ==
=== Playing statistics ===
No.	Pos	Nat	Player	Total		Ligue 1		Algerian Cup	
No.	Pos	Nat	Player	Apps	Goals	Apps	Goals	Apps	Goals
Goalkeepers
1	GK	(Algeria) ALG	Mohamed Amine Sahnoun	15	0	15	0	0	0
16	GK	(Algeria) ALG	Walid Ouabdi	5	0	2	0	3	0
30	GK	(Algeria) ALG	Abdelghani Hamel	4	0	4	0	0	0
Defenders
5	DF	(Algeria) ALG	Oussama Rahali	0	0	0	0	0	0
14	DF	(Algeria) ALG	Braim Ladraâ	14	0	11	0	3	0
20	DF	(Algeria) ALG	Aissa Seddiq Larbi	1	0	0	0	1	0
22	DF	(Algeria) ALG	Farouk Benmaarouf	4	0	3	0	1	0
24	DF	(Algeria) ALG	Mohamed Roufid Arab	24	3	21	1	3	2
25	DF	(Algeria) ALG	Kheireddine Benamrane	17	1	15	1	2	0
27	DF	(Algeria) ALG	Khalfallah Belhaoua	23	0	21	0	2	0
	DF	(Algeria) ALG	Nour El Islam Fettouhi	2	0	1	0	1	0
Midfielders
3	MF	(Algeria) ALG	Brahim Benzaza	21	0	19	0	2	0
6	MF	(Algeria) ALG	Omar Embarek	1	0	0	0	1	0
7	MF	(Algeria) ALG	Mohamed Bengrina	13	1	13	1	0	0
12	MF	(Mali) MLI	Massiré Dembélé	23	0	21	0	2	0
13	MF	(Algeria) ALG	Walid Hellal	18	2	17	2	1	0
15	MF	(Algeria) ALG	Fawzi Benhamla	12	2	10	2	2	0
18	MF	(Algeria) ALG	Mostapha Alili	12	1	9	0	3	1
19	MF	(Algeria) ALG	Islam Merili	9	0	9	0	0	0
28	MF	(Algeria) ALG	Abdelhak Messaoudi	0	0	0	0	0	0
29	MF	(Algeria) ALG	Abdelkader Boussaid	21	1	18	1	3	0
	MF	(Algeria) ALG	Kaddour Beldjilali	6	0	6	0	0	0
Forwards
2	FW	(Algeria) ALG	Chaker Kaddour Chérif	3	0	2	0	1	0
8	FW	(Algeria) ALG	Fethallah Tahar	17	1	16	1	1	0
9	FW	(Algeria) ALG	Mansour Benothmane	7	3	4	0	3	3
10	FW	(Algeria) ALG	Mohamed Benkablia	10	1	9	1	1	0
17	FW	(Algeria) ALG	Abdelouahab Djahel	17	3	15	2	2	1
21	FW	(Algeria) ALG	Hadj Habib Saïd Fellahi	9	2	6	0	3	2
26	FW	(Algeria) ALG	Abdelkader Kaibou	14	0	12	0	2	0
31	FW	(Mauritania) MTN	Mohamed Salem Mohamed	8	0	8	0	0	0
	FW	(Ghana) GHA	Rahim Osumanu	0	0	0	0	0	0
	FW	(Algeria) ALG	Mohamed Boulaouidet	5	3	5	3	0	0
	FW	(Algeria) ALG	Walid Djaballah Boudjebiba	3	0	3	0	0	0
Players transferred out during the season

Last updated: 17 November 2019
Source: fr.soccerway.com

=== Goalscorers ===
Includes all competitive matches. The list is sorted alphabetically by surname when total goals are equal.

No.	Nat.	Player	Pos.	L 1	AC	TOTAL
	(Algeria)	Mohamed Boulaouidet	FW	3	0	3
9	(Algeria)	Mansour Benothmane	FW	0	3	3
17	(Algeria)	Abdelouahab Djahel	FW	2	1	3
24	(Algeria)	Mohamed Roufid Arab	DF	1	2	3
13	(Algeria)	Walid Hellal	MF	2	0	2
15	(Algeria)	Fawzi Benhamla	MF	2	0	2
21	(Algeria)	Hadj Habib Saïd Fellahi	FW	0	2	2
25	(Algeria)	Kheireddine Benamrane	DF	1	0	1
7	(Algeria)	Mohamed Bengrina	MF	1	0	1
29	(Algeria)	Abdelkader Boussaid	MF	1	0	1
8	(Algeria)	Féth-Allah Tahar	FW	1	0	1
10	(Algeria)	Mohamed Benkablia	FW	1	0	1
18	(Algeria)	Mostapha Alili	MF	0	1	1
Own Goals				0	0	0
Totals				15	9	24

== Transfers ==
=== In ===
Date	Pos	Player	from club	Transfer fee	Source
1 July 2019	FW	(Algeria) Féthi Tahar	RC Relizane	Free transfer	
11 July 2019	MF	(Mali) Massiré Dembélé	Olympique de Médéa	Free transfer	
11 July 2019	FW	(Algeria) Mustapha Allili	JSM Tiaret	Free transfer	
15 July 2019	MF	(Algeria) Saïd Fellahi	ES Mostaganem	Free transfer	
15 July 2019	FW	(Algeria) Hichem Benmeghit	ES Mostaganem	Free transfer	
7 August 2019	FW	(Mauritania) Mohamed Salem	(Kuwait) Burgan SC	Free transfer	
20 January 2020	MF	(Algeria) Kaddour Beldjilali	JS Saoura	Free transfer	
21 January 2020	FW	(Ghana) Rahim Osumanu	(Zambia) Mufulira Wanderers	Free transfer	
22 January 2020	FW	(Algeria) Mohamed Boulaouidet	(Sudan) Al-Hilal Club	Free transfer	
