= Salem Laoufi =

Algerian football manager

Personal information
- Date of birth: 7 January 1971 (age 55)

Team information
- Current team: ASM Oran (manager)

Managerial career
- Years: Team
- 2011–2013: USM El Harrach (assistant)
- 2014–2015: GC Mascara
- 2016: JS Saoura (assistant)
- 2016: JS Saoura
- 2017–2018: ASM Oran
- 2018–2019: USM El Harrach
- 2019–: ASM Oran

Salem Laoufi (born 7 January 1971) is an Algerian football manager.
