= Gianni Seraf =

French footballer (born 1994)

Personal information
- Date of birth: 5 July 1994 (age 32)
- Place of birth: Thiais, France
- Height: 1.69 m (5 ft 7 in)
- Position: Midfielder

Team information
- Current team: Thonon Evian
- Number: 18

Youth career
- Montpellier

Senior career*
Years	Team	Apps	(Gls)
2013-2015	Montpellier B	33	(2)
2016	Vilanova		
2017	JS Saoura	1	(0)
2017-2018	Tarbes	27	(5)
2018	Panionios	3	(0)
2019	Derry City	4	(0)
2020	Sainte-Geneviève	4	(2)
2020–2021	Paris 13 Atletico	8	(1)
2021–	Thonon Evian	4	(0)
- * Club domestic league appearances and goals as of 04:43, 9 June 2022 (UTC)

Gianni Seraf (born 5 July 1994) is a French professional footballer who plays as a midfielder for Championnat National 1 club Thonon Evian.

== Career ==
Before the second half of the 2015–16 season, Seraf signed for Vilanova in the Spanish fifth division, after having playing for the reserves of French Ligue 1 side Montpellier. Before the second half of the 2016–17 season, he signed for JS Saoura in Algeria.

In 2018, Seraf signed for Greek top flight club Panionios.

In 2019, Seraf signed for Northern Irish team Derry City, before joining Sainte-Geneviève in the French fourth division.

== Personal life ==
Born in France, Seraf is of Algerian descent.

== Honours ==
Thonon Evian

- Championnat National 3: 2021–22
