= Mansour Benothmane =

Algerian footballer (born 1997)

Personal information
- Full name: Mansour Benothmane eto
- Date of birth: 10 August 1997 (age 29)
- Place of birth: Tiaret, Algeria
- Position: Forward

Team information
- Current team: ESF Bir El Ater
- Number: 9

Youth career
- –2015: JSM Tiaret
- 2015–2016: ES Sétif

Senior career*
Years	Team	Apps	(Gls)
2016	ES Sétif	–	(–)
2016–2018	Club Africain	6	(2)
2018	MC Alger	8	(1)
2019–2020	→ ASO Chlef (loan)		
2020–2021	CA Bordj Bou Arréridj	1	(0)
2021–2023	MC El Eulma	0	(0)
2023–2024	RC Kouba	0	(0)
2024	NRB Teleghma	0	(0)
2024–2025	ES Guelma	0	(0)
2025–	ESF Bir El Ater	0	(0)

International career^{‡}
2015–2016	Algeria U20	4	(1)
- * Club domestic league appearances and goals as of 4 December 2025 ‡ National team caps and goals as of 31 December 2016

Mansour Benothmane (born August 7, 1997, in Tiaret) is an Algerian footballer who is currently playing as a midfielder for ESF Bir El Ater.

Benothmane is an Algeria under-20 international.

== Club career ==
On November 26, Benothmane made his senior debut for Club Africain in a league match against CS Hammam-Lif, scoring a goal just a few minutes after coming onto the pitch.
