= Sofiane Bencharif =

French footballer (born 1986)

Personal information
- Full name: Sofiane Bencharif
- Date of birth: 11 August 1986 (age 40)
- Place of birth: Ollioules, France
- Height: 1.87 m (6 ft 2 in)
- Position: Forward

Team information
- Current team: WA Tlemcen
- Number: 11

Senior career*
Years	Team	Apps	(Gls)
2009	MC Alger	-	(-)
2009–2010	ES Sétif	6	(1)
2010	Olympique Béja	0	(0)
2010–2011	JS Kairouan	0	(0)
2011–	WA Tlemcen	8	(2)
- * Club domestic league appearances and goals

Sofiane Bencharif (born 11 August 1986), sometimes spelt as Soufiane Bencherif, is a French football player who is currently playing as a forward for Widad Amel Tlemcen.

On 28 June 2010 Bencharif signed a two-year contract with Tunisian club Olympique Béja. However, on 28 August 2010 it was announced that Bencharif had signed a two-year contract with another Tunisian club, JS Kairouan.
