= Mohamed Benkablia =

Algerian footballer (born 1993)

Personal information
- Date of birth: February 2, 1993 (age 33)
- Place of birth: Oran, Algeria
- Height: 1.80 m (5 ft 11 in)
- Position: Forward

Team information
- Current team: IRB El Kerma

Youth career
- 2010–2012: ASM Oran
- 2012–2013: AC FAF

Senior career*
Years	Team	Apps	(Gls)
2013–2016	ASM Oran	61	(8)
2016–	JS Kabylie	12	(0)
2016–2018	USM Alger	13	(0)
2018	CR Belouizdad	5	(0)
2018–2020	ASO Chlef	10	(1)
2021	NC Magra	16	(1)
2021–2022	ASM Oran	–	(–)
2022	SC Mécheria	–	(–)
2024–	IRB El Kerma	–	(–)

International career^{‡}
2012–2013	Algeria U20	4	(1)
2014–2016	Algeria U23	17	(3)
- * Club domestic league appearances and goals as of 1 August 2024 ‡ National team caps and goals as of 24 July 2016

Mohamed Benkablia (born February 2, 1993) is an Algerian international footballer who plays for IRB El Kerma in the Inter-Régions Division. He took part in the 2016 Summer Olympics football tournament.

== Career ==
Mohamed Benkablia started playing football with ASM Oran. In June 2016, Benkablia signed a two-year contract with JS Kabylie.
