= Abdelmalek Merbah =

Algerian footballer (born 1985)

Personal information
- Full name: Abdelmalek Merbah
- Date of birth: May 19, 1985 (age 41)
- Place of birth: Algiers, Algeria
- Position: Defender

Team information
- Current team: RC Kouba
- Number: 21

Senior career*
Years	Team	Apps	(Gls)
2009–2010	NARB Réghaïa	–	(–)
2010–2011	USM Alger	–	(–)
2011–2012	NA Hussein Dey	19	(1)
2012–2013	JS Saoura	15	(1)
2013–2014	JS Kabylie	11	(0)
2014–2016	MC Oran	45	(0)
2016–2018	JSM Béjaïa	?	(?)
2018–	RC Kouba	?	(?)
- * Club domestic league appearances and goals as of 16:00, February 24, 2016 (UTC)

Abdelmalek Merbah (born March 19, 1985) is an Algerian footballer who plays for RC Kouba in the Algerian Ligue Professionnelle 2.

== Club career ==
In June 2014, Merbah signed a contract with MC Oran coming from JS Kabylie.

== Honours ==
- Algerian Ligue 1

Runner-up: 2013-14 with JS Kabylie
