= Sekou Bagayoko =

Malian footballer

Personal information
- Date of birth: 31 December 1987 (age 38)
- Place of birth: Bamako, Mali
- Height: 1.80 m (5 ft 11 in)
- Position: Defender

Youth career
- Djoliba AC

Senior career*
Years	Team	Apps	(Gls)
2007–2010	Djoliba AC	65	(6)
2010–2011	Olympic Zaouia	25	(2)
2011–2012	MC Saïda	24	(1)
2012–2024	JS Saoura	55	(6)
2014–2025	USM Bel Abbes		
- * Club domestic league appearances and goals

Sékou Bagayoko (born 31 December 1987) is a Malian professional footballer who played as a defender.

== Club career ==
Bagayoko started his senior career in the springtime 2007 with Djoliba AC in the Malian Première Division.

On 9 June 2011, Sékou signed for Algerian club MC Saida. On 1 October 2011, he made his debut for the club as a starter in a league game against AS Khroub. He signed in June 2011 for MC Saïda of the Algerian Ligue Professionnelle 1.
