= Mohamed Aoudou =

Beninese international footballer

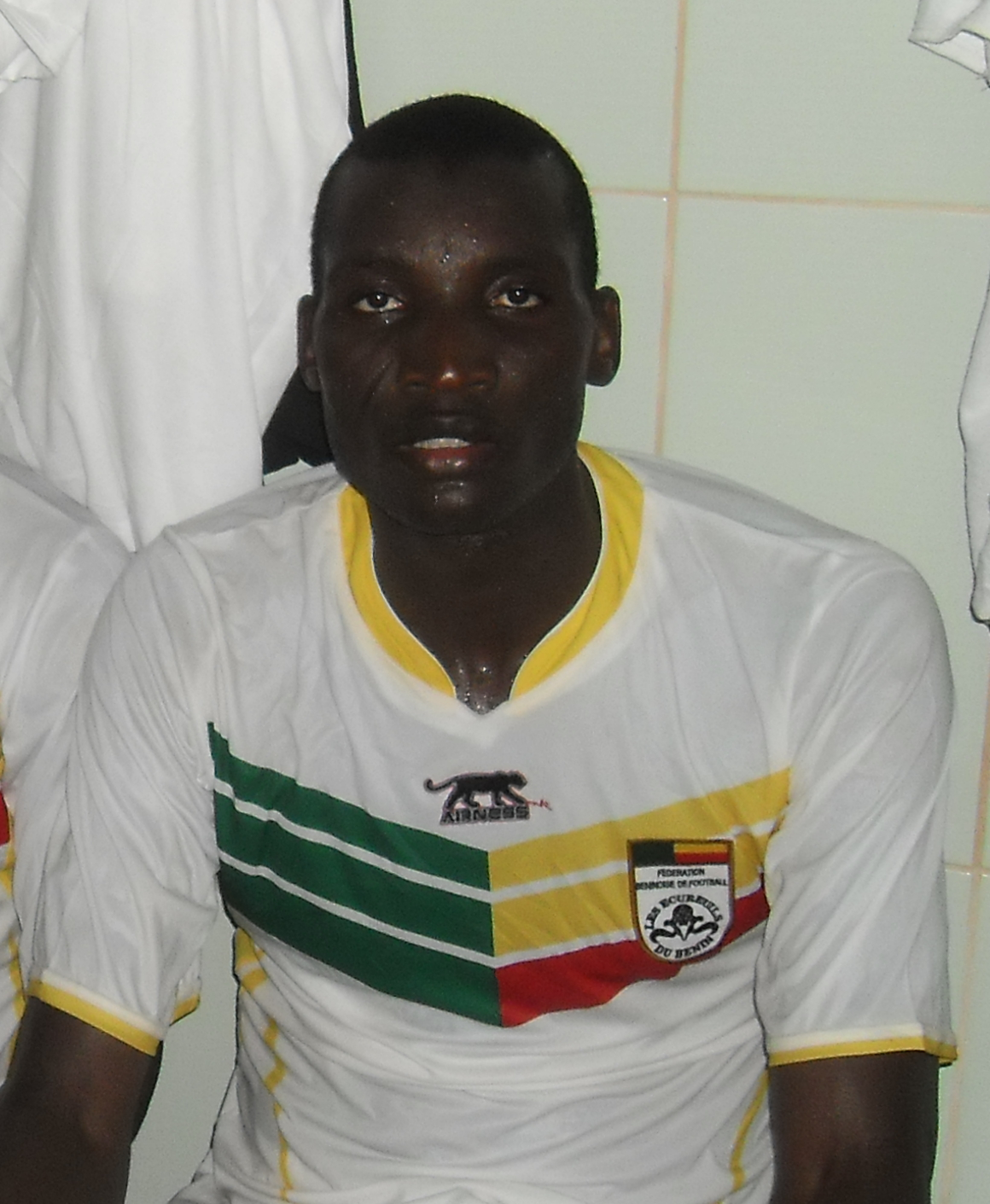

Personal information
- Full name: Mohamed Aoudou Golanne
- Date of birth: 30 November 1989 (age 36)
- Place of birth: Aplahoué, Benin
- Height: 1.90 m (6 ft 3 in)
- Position: Forward

Senior career*
Years	Team	Apps	(Gls)
2008–2009	Mambas Noirs	20	(13)
2009	Istra 1961	5	(0)
2009–2010	Évian TG	8	(0)
2010–2012	Tonnerre d'Abomey		
2012–2013	COD Meknès	16	(1)
2013–2015	JS Saoura	44	(15)
2015–2016	CR Belouizdad	27	(2)
2016–2017	Free State Stars	0	(0)
2017	Al-Shorta		(2)
2017–2018	Al-Nahda		
2018–2019	Mosta	2	(0)

International career^{‡}
2009–	Benin	16	(2)
- * Club domestic league appearances and goals as of 20:07, 8 February 2017 (UTC) ‡ National team caps and goals as of 14:43, 1 May 2020 (UTC)

Mohamed Aoudou Golanne (born 30 November 1989) is a Beninese professional footballer who plays as a forward. Between 2009 and 2016 he made 16 appearances scoring 2 goals for the Benin national team.

== Career ==
Born in Aplahoué, Aoudou has played club football for Mambas Noirs, Istra 1961, Évian TG, Tonnerre d'Abomey, COD Meknès, JS Saoura, CR Belouizdad, Free State Stars and Al-Shorta. He scored two goals for Al-Shorta in the 2016–17 Iraqi Premier League.

He made his international debut for Benin in 2009, and has appeared in FIFA World Cup qualifying matches.
