= Kaddour Beldjilali =

Algerian footballer (born 1988)

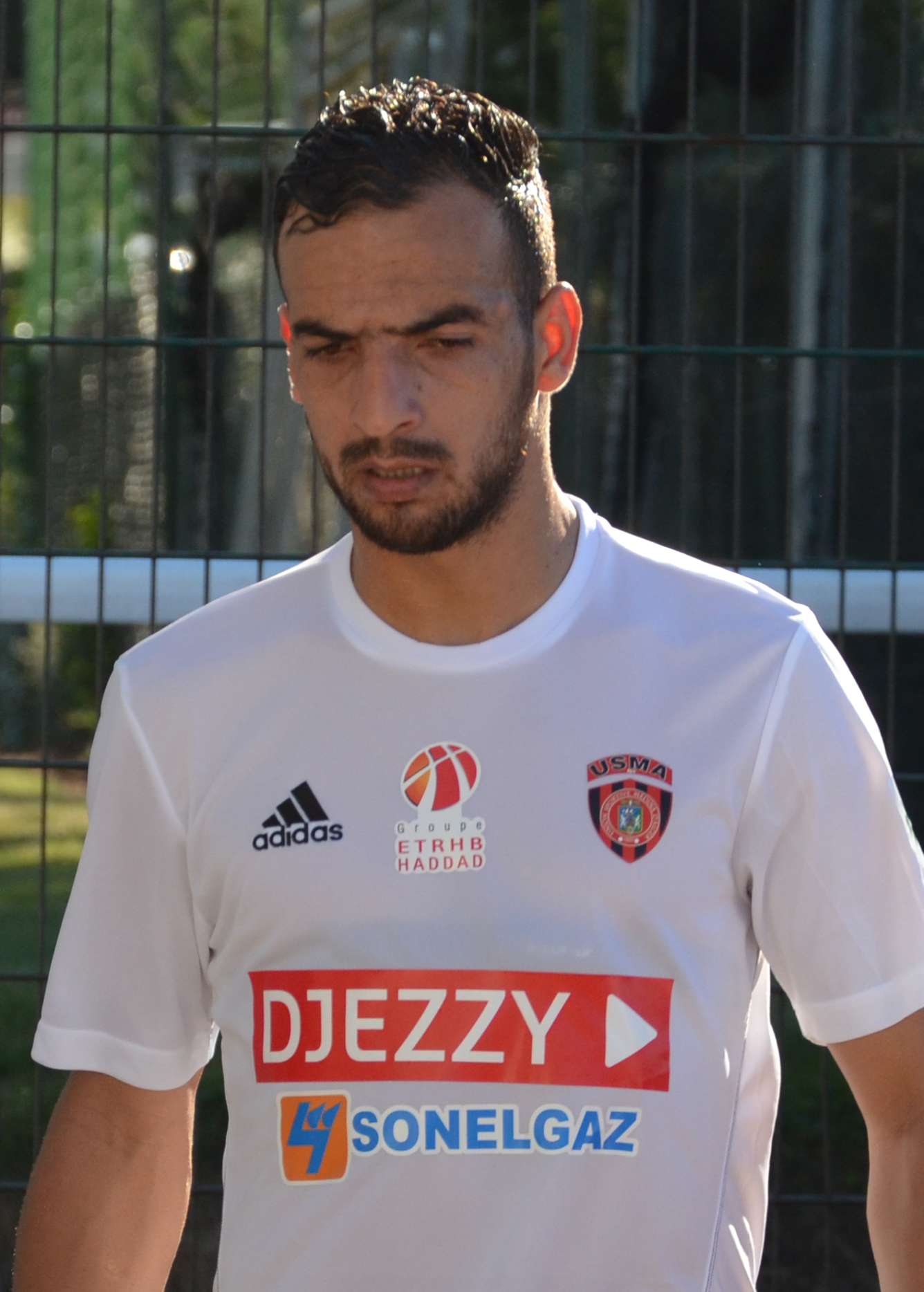

Personal information
- Full name: Kaddour Beldjilali
- Date of birth: November 28, 1988 (age 37)
- Place of birth: Oran, Algeria
- Position: Attacking midfielder

Youth career
- –2008: MC Oran
- 2008–2009: CR Témouchent

Senior career*
Years	Team	Apps	(Gls)
2009–2010	MC Oran		
2010–2011	USM Blida	6	(0)
2011–2014	JS Saoura	80	(19)
2014–2015	Étoile du Sahel	8	(1)
2015–2018	USM Alger	53	(1)
2018–2019	CS Constantine	21	(2)
2019	JS Saoura	12	(0)
2020–2021	ASO Chlef	36	(7)
2021–2022	Bisha	15	(0)
2022	Al-Arabi		
2022–2023	Al-Sadd		
2023	ES Mostaganem	1	(0)

International career
2013	Algeria A'	1	(0)
- * Club domestic league appearances and goals as of 29 September 2023

Kaddour Beldjilali (Arabic: قدور بلجيلالي; born November 28, 1988) is an Algerian footballer who plays as an attacking midfielder.

== Club career ==
Beldjilali started his career in the youth ranks of MC Oran before moving to USM Blida and then JS Saoura.

After three seasons with JS Saoura, Beldjilali joined Tunisian club Étoile du Sahel, with the Tunisians paying a transfer fee of €360,000. In 2020, Beldjilali signed a contract with ASO Chlef.

On 15 June 2022, Beldjilali joined Al-Sadd.

== International career ==
In May 2013, Beldjilali was called up to the Algeria A' national football team for the first time for a friendly match against Mauritania. He made his international debut as a starter in the match, which Algeria won 1–0, before being substituted off at half-time.

== Honours ==
With USM Alger:

- Algerian Ligue Professionnelle 1 (1): 2015-16
- Algerian Super Cup (1): 2016
