= Saïd Sayah =

Algerian footballer (born 1989)

Personal information
- Full name: Saïd Sayah
- Date of birth: July 21, 1989 (age 37)
- Place of birth: Oran, Algeria
- Height: 1.80 m (5 ft 11 in)
- Position: Midfielder

Team information
- Current team: JSM Tiaret
- Number: 10

Youth career
- MC Oran
- –2008: USM Alger

Senior career*
| Years | Team | Apps | (Gls) |
| 2008–2013 | USM Alger | 58 | (2) |
| 2011–2012 | → MC Saïda (loan) | 15 | (2) |
| 2012 | → WA Tlemcen (loan) | 8 | (0) |
| 2013 | → CRB Aïn Fakroun (loan) | 0 | (0) |
| 2013–2017 | JS Saoura | 84 | (6) |
| 2017–2018 | CR Belouizdad | 4 | (0) |
| 2018–2019 | ASO Chlef | 14 | (1) |
| 2019–2020 | ASM Oran | 7 | (0) |
| 2020–2021 | ES Mostaganem | | |
| 2021 | IRB El Kerma | | |
| 2021–2022 | JSM Tiaret | | |
| 2022–2023 | MCB Oued Sly | | |
| 2023–2024 | JSM Tiaret | | |
| 2024– | GC Mascara | | |

International career^{‡}
| 2008 | Algeria U20 | 2 | (0) |
| 2010 | Algeria U23 | 8 | (1) |
- * Club domestic league appearances and goals as of 29 July 2024 (UTC) ‡ National team caps and goals as of 29 July 2011 (UTC)

Saïd Sayah (Arabic: سعيد سايح; born July 21, 1989) is an Algerian football player who is currently playing as a midfielder for GC Mascara in the Algerian Ligue 2.

== Club career ==
On July 27, 2011, Sayah was loaned out to MC Saïda for one season.

=== Statistics ===
As of 29 July 2011

| Club performance | | | League | | Cup | | Total | |
| Season | Club | League | Apps | Goals | Apps | Goals | Apps | Goals |
| Algeria | | | League | | Algerian Cup | | Total | |
|---|---|---|---|---|---|---|---|---|
| 2007–08 | USM Alger | Algerian Ligue Professionnelle 1 | 2 | 0 | 0 | 0 | 2 | 0 |
| 2008–09 | USM Alger | Algerian Ligue Professionnelle 1 | 18 | 0 | 1 | 0 | 19 | 0 |
| 2009–10 | USM Alger | Algerian Ligue Professionnelle 1 | 19 | 2 | 1 | 0 | 20 | 2 |
| 2010–11 | USM Alger | Algerian Ligue Professionnelle 1 | 19 | 0 | 1 | 0 | 20 | 0 |
| Total | Algeria | | 58 | 2 | 3 | 0 | 61 | 2 |
| Career total | | | 58 | 2 | 3 | 0 | 61 | 2 |
