= Abdenour Belkheir =

Algerian association football player (born 1989)

Personal information
- Full name: Abdenour Belkheir
- Date of birth: 21 February 1989 (age 37)
- Place of birth: Arzew, Algeria
- Height: 1.68 m (5 ft 6 in)
- Position: Forward

Team information
- Current team: JSM Tiaret
- Number: 18

Youth career
- –2006: RCG Oran

Senior career*
Years	Team	Apps	(Gls)
2006–2007	RCG Oran	–	(–)
2008–2010	MC Alger	27	(0)
2010–2012	USM Blida	51	(6)
2012–2016	JS Saoura	108	(6)
2016–2019	CS Constantine	68	(2)
2019–2022	MC Alger	59	(5)
2023–	JSM Tiaret	0	(0)

International career^{‡}
2018–	Algeria	1	(0)
- * Club domestic league appearances and goals as of 31 August 2023 ‡ National team caps and goals as of 12 October 2018

Abdenour Belkheir (Arabic: عبد النور بلخير; born 21 February 1989) is an Algerian professional footballer who plays as a forward for JSM Tiaret.

== Career ==
In 2019, he joined MC Alger.

== International career ==
Belkheir made his senior debut with the Algeria national football team in a friendly 2–0 loss to Saudi Arabia on 9 May 2018.
