= Nabil Bousmaha =

Algerian footballer (born 1990)

Personal information
- Full name: Nabil Bousmaha
- Date of birth: 2 December 1990 (age 35)
- Place of birth: Beni Ounif, Algeria
- Height: 1.70 m (5 ft 7 in)
- Position: Midfielder

Team information
- Current team: CA Bordj Bou Arréridj
- Number: 13

Youth career
- –2009: JS Saoura

Senior career*
Years	Team	Apps	(Gls)
2009–2018	JS Saoura	188	(1)
2019–2020	NA Hussein Dey	20	(0)
2020–	CA Bordj Bou Arréridj	1	(0)
- * Club domestic league appearances and goals as of 27 November 2020

Nabil Bousmaha (born 2 December 1990) is an Algerian footballer who plays as a midfielder for CA Bordj Bou Arréridj in the Algerian Ligue Professionnelle 1.
