= Touhami Sebie =

Algerian footballer (born 1988)

Personal information
- Full name: Touhami Sebie
- Date of birth: 3 May 1988 (age 38)
- Place of birth: Algeria
- Position: Defender

Team information
- Current team: CA Bordj Bou Arréridj
- Number: 18

Senior career*
| Years | Team | Apps | (Gls) |
| 2009–2011 | USM Blida | 26 | (0) |
| 2011–2012 | AS Khroub | 15 | (0) |
| 2012–2016 | JS Saoura | / | (0) |
| 2016–2017 | JS Kabylie | / | (0) |
| 2017– | CA Bordj Bou Arréridj | / | (0) |
- * Club domestic league appearances and goals as of 00:00, 20 September 2011 (UTC)

Touhami Sebie (born 3 May 1988) is an Algerian footballer. He is currently playing for CA Bordj Bou Arréridj in the Algerian Ligue Professionnelle 1.
