= 2024–25 JS Saoura season =

JS Saoura
2024–25 season
- Owner: ENAFOR
- Head coach: Tahar Chérif El-Ouazzani (from 25 July 2024) (until 15 September 2024); Moustapha Djallit (c) (from 15 September 2024) (until 20 November 2024); Mourad Okbi (from 20 November 2024) (until 11 April 2025); Moustapha Djallit (c) (from 11 April 2025)
- Stadium: 20 August 1955 Stadium
- Ligue 1: 4th
- Algerian Cup: Round of 32
Home colours	Away colours

The 2024–25 season, is JS Saoura's 12th consecutive season in the top flight of Algerian football. In addition to the domestic league, JS Saoura are participating in the Algerian Cup. On June 27, 2024, The federal office approved the calendar for the 2024–25 Ligue 1 season with the aim of ending on May 31, 2025. The first round is scheduled for September 14, this delay is motivated both by an extended end of the 2023–24 season but also by the holding of early presidential elections which will take place on September 7, 2024. However, the Ligue de Football Professionnel decided to postpone the start of the Ligue 1 by a week, on September 21.

On August 8, 2024, the Minister of Housing, Urban Planning and the City, accompanied by the Minister of Youth and Sports Abderrahmane Hammad, gave the official start to the construction works of the new complex in Bechar, which will be allocated to JS Saoura. This project, which covers an area of 40 hectares, includes an indoor football stadium with a capacity of 25,000 seats, an athletics stadium with 6,500 seats, an Olympic swimming pool with 1,200 seats, and a multi-purpose hall with 400 seats, as well as a car park, according to the project's technical sheet.

== Squad list ==
Players and squad numbers last updated on 5 February 2025.
Note: Flags indicate national team as has been defined under FIFA eligibility rules. Players may hold more than one non-FIFA nationality.

No.	Nat.	Name	Position	Date of birth (age)	Signed from
Goalkeepers
1	(Algeria)	Abdennasser Djoudar	GK	11 March 2001 (aged 23)	(Algeria) MCB Oued Sly
12	(Algeria)	Abdelkader Morcely	GK	17 September 1995 (aged 28)	(Algeria) HB Chelghoum Laïd
16	(Algeria)	Mohamed Zakaria Haouli	GK	28 April 1997 (aged 27)	(Algeria) CR Temouchent
Defenders
2	(Algeria)	Riyane Akacem	CB	13 February 1999 (aged 25)	(Algeria) Reserve team
4	(Algeria)	Fayçal Mebarki	CB	31 August 2000 (aged 24)	(Algeria) Reserve team
6	(Algeria)	Rafik Brahimi	LB	15 May 1999 (aged 25)	(Algeria) RC Arbaâ
13	(Algeria)	Nasreddine Zaalani	CB	26 July 1992 (aged 33)	(Bahrain) Al-Khaldiya SC
14	(Algeria)	Ilyes Haddouche	CB	1 July 1998 (aged 26)	(Algeria) ES Ben Aknoun
17	(Algeria)	Mohamed Amrane	CB	27 January 1994 (aged 30)	(Algeria) CA Bordj Bou Arreridj
22	(Algeria)	Mohamed Azzedine Berriah	RB	16 July 1999 (aged 25)	(Algeria) MC El Bayadh
24	(Algeria)	Abdenour Barkat	RB	26 July 2003 (aged 21)	(Algeria) Reserve team
Midfielders
5	(Algeria)	Abdelkader Boutiche	DM	26 October 1996 (aged 27)	(Algeria) ES Ben Aknoun
8	(Algeria)	Massinissa Benchelouche	CM	11 October 2001 (aged 22)	(Algeria) MC Alger
18	(Algeria)	Juba Oukaci	CM	8 July 1996 (aged 26)	(Algeria) Olympique Akbou
20	(Algeria)	Sid Ahmed Matallah	DM	14 January 1996 (aged 29)	(Algeria) JS Kabylie
25	(Algeria)	Adel Bouchiba	DM	10 November 1988 (aged 35)	(Algeria) Olympique de Médéa
27	(Algeria)	Mohamed Taib	AM	20 April 1994 (aged 30)	(Algeria) RC Arbaâ
Forwards
7	(Algeria)	Kamel Belmiloud	RW	23 July 1995 (aged 29)	(Algeria) MC El Bayadh
9	(Ivory Coast)	Stéphane Bédi	ST	20 December 1995 (aged 28)	(Ivory Coast) FC San Pédro
10	(Algeria)	Nour El Islam Fettouhi	RW	28 August 1999 (aged 25)	(Algeria) USM Alger
11	(Algeria)	Mohamed Souibaâh	ST	25 December 1991 (aged 32)	(Algeria) ASO Chlef
15	(Algeria)	Ismail Saadi	LW	4 April 1997 (aged 27)	(Algeria) ES Sétif
19	(Algeria)	Mohamed Ayoub Belhachemi	ST	10 March 2003 (aged 21)	(Algeria) Reserve team
21	(Algeria)	Oussama Bentaleb	RW	12 October 2001 (aged 22)	(Algeria) JS Guir
23	(Algeria)	Abdelkader Ghorab	LW	28 February 1998 (aged 26)	(Libya) Anwar Al-Abyar
26	(Algeria)	Mohamed El Amine Hammia	LW	21 December 1991 (aged 32)	(Algeria) USM Blida

== Transfers ==
=== In ===
==== Summer ====
Date	Pos	Player	Moving from	Fee	Source
24 July 2024	FW	(Algeria) Kamel Belmiloud	MC El Bayadh	Free transfer	
24 July 2024	CB	(Algeria) Azzedine Berriah	MC El Bayadh	Free transfer	
24 July 2024	CB	(Algeria) Ilyes Haddouche	ES Ben Aknoun	Free transfer	
24 July 2024	MF	(Algeria) Yacine Medane	US Biskra	Free transfer	
24 July 2024	FW	(Algeria) Hamek Abbes	Olympique Akbou	Free transfer	
24 July 2024	FW	(Algeria) Oussama Bentaleb	JS Guir	Free transfer	
24 July 2024	FW	(Algeria) Aymene Rahmani	CR Belouizdad	Free transfer	
25 July 2024	MF	(Algeria) Abdelkader Boutiche	ES Ben Aknoun	Free transfer	

==== Winter ====
Date	Pos	Player	Moving from	Fee	Source
9 January 2025	CB	(Mali) Yacouba Doumbia	Unattached	Free transfer	
10 January 2025	CM	(Algeria) Juba Oukaci	Olympique Akbou	Free transfer	
24 January 2025	GK	(Algeria) Abdelkader Morcely	Paradou AC	Undisclosed	
29 January 2025	MF	(Algeria) Sid Ahmed Maatallah	JS Kabylie	Loan	
1 February 2025	CB	(Algeria) Nasreddine Zaalani	(Bahrain) Al-Khaldiya SC	Free transfer	
1 February 2025	ST	(Ivory Coast) Guy Stéphane Bédi	(Ivory Coast) FC San Pédro	Free transfer	

=== Out ===
==== Summer ====
Date	Pos	Player	Moving to	Fee	Source
10 July 2024	FW	(Algeria) Aimen Abdelaziz Lahmeri	JS Kabylie	Undisclosed	
22 July 2024	GK	(Algeria) Aymen Mouyet	Unattached	Free transfer (Released)	
22 July 2024	CB	(Algeria) Amine Benmiloud	Unattached	Free transfer (Released)	
22 July 2024	FW	(Algeria) Abdelhak Abdelhafid	Unattached	Free transfer (Released)	
22 July 2024	FW	(Algeria) Cheikh Amieur	Unattached	Free transfer (Released)	
22 July 2024	CB	(Algeria) Benali Benamar	Unattached (Note: Benamar joined ES Mostaganem on 10 August 2024.)	Free transfer (Released)	
24 July 2024	MF	(Algeria) Ilyes Atallah	Unattached	Free transfer (Released)	
24 July 2024	FW	(Algeria) Mohamed Amine Ouis	Unattached	Free transfer (Released)	
27 July 2024	MF	(Algeria) Abdeljalil Saâd	Unattached	Free transfer (Released)	
4 August 2024	LB	(Algeria) Marwane Khelif	MC Alger	80,000,000 DA	

== Competitions ==
=== Overview ===
Competition	Record								Started round	Final position / round	First match	Last match
Competition	G	W	D	L	GF	GA	GD	Win %	Started round	Final position / round	First match	Last match
Ligue 1	30	12	7	11	34	36	−2	40.00	—N/a	4th	24 September 2024	20 June 2025
Algerian Cup	2	1	0	1	3	3	+0	50.00	Round of 64	Round of 32	2 January 2025	14 January 2025
Total	32	13	7	12	37	39	−2	40.63				

Updated to match played 20 June 2025
Source: Competitions

=== Ligue 1 ===
==== League table ====
Pos	Team	Pld	W	D	L	GF	GA	GD	Pts	Qualification or relegation
2	JS Kabylie	30	16	8	6	42	27	+15	56	Qualification for CAF Champions League
3	CR Belouizdad	30	15	10	5	44	21	+23	55	Qualification for Confederation Cup (Note: USMA Alger qualified for the 2025–26 CAF Confederation Cup by winning the 2024–25 Algerian Cup)
4	JS Saoura	30	12	7	11	34	36	−2	43	
5	Paradou AC	30	11	8	11	41	39	+2	41	
6	ES Sétif	30	11	8	11	21	24	−3	41	

Source: the-sports.org
Rules for classification: 1) points; 2) head-to-head points; 3) head-to-head goal difference; 4) goal difference; 5) total goals; 6) fairplay ranking; 7) playoff.

==== Results summary ====
Overall								Home						Away					
Pld	W	D	L	GF	GA	GD	Pts	W	D	L	GF	GA	GD	W	D	L	GF	GA	GD
30	12	7	11	34	36	−2	43	9	5	1	22	12	+10	3	2	10	12	24	−12

Last updated: 20 June 2025.
Source: Competitive matches

==== Results by round ====
Round	1	2	3	4	5	6	7	8	9	10	11	12	13	14	15	16	17	18	19	20	21	22	23	24	25	26	27	28	29	30
Ground	A	H	A	H	A	H	A	H	A	A	H	A	H	A	H	H	A	H	A	H	A	H	A	H	H	A	H	A	H	A
Result	L	D	L	W	L	W	L	W	L	D	D	L	D	L	W	W	W	W	L	W	L	L	L	W	D	W	D	W	W	D
Position	15	14	15	10	13	9	13	10	13	13	14	14	15	15	13	12	9	8	10	8	10	10	10	10	10	9	9	5	4	4

Updated to match(es) played on 20 June 2025. Source: Competitive matches
A = Away; H = Home; W = Win; D = Draw; L = Loss

==== Matches ====
The league fixtures were announced on 11 July 2024.

All times are local, WAT (UTC+1).

Win Draw Loss Postponed

24 September 2024 Round 1	MC Oran	2–0	JS Saoura	Bir El Djir
18:00	Belmiloud 11' (o.g.); Kerroum 78'	Report		Stadium: Miloud Hadefi Stadium; Referee: Bilel Soltani; VAR: Lotfi Bekouassa

27 September 2024 Round 2	JS Saoura	1–1	USM Khenchela	Béchar
16:00	Boutiche 79' (pen.)	Report	Kaddour 27'	Stadium: 20 August 1955 Stadium; Referee: Tayeb Benyabka

4 October 2024 Round 3	Olympique Akbou	2–1	JS Saoura	Béjaïa
16:00	Bouteldja 86'; Haroun 90+9'	Report	Belmiloud 45+1'	Stadium: Maghrebi Unity Stadium; Referee: Hamza Bouslimani

11 October 2024 Round 4	JS Saoura	3–2	ES Sétif	Béchar
16:00	Souibaâh 7'; Belmiloud 45+4'; Bentaleb 86'	Report	Chaabi 38' (pen.), 66'	Stadium: 20 August 1955 Stadium; Referee: Youcef Taieb Bouderbal

19 October 2024 Round 5	US Biskra	2–1	JS Saoura	Biskra
17:45	Chahmat 37'; Saâd 86'	Report	Haddouche 3'	Stadium: 18 February Stadium; Referee: Lahlou Benbraham; VAR: Houssam Benyahia

25 October 2024 Round 6	JS Saoura	1–0	MC El Bayadh	Béchar
16:00	Akacem 87'	Report		Stadium: 20 August 1955 Stadium; Referee: Abdelali Ibrir

9 November 2024 Round 8	JS Saoura	1–0	NC Magra	Béchar
16:00	Boutiche 85' (pen.)	Report		Stadium: 20 August 1955 Stadium; Referee: Ayoub Belhachemi

16 November 2024 Round 9	USM Alger	2–0	JS Saoura	Algiers
17:30	Boukhanchouche 19'; Belkacemi 65' (pen.)	Report		Stadium: Stade du 5 Juillet; Attendance: 0 (close doors); Referee: Akram Mechairia; VAR: Rafik Aouina

23 November 2024 Round 10	ES Mostaganem	1–1	JS Saoura	Mostaganem
16:00	Ghanem 84'	Report	Saadi 19'	Stadium: Mohamed Bensaïd Stadium; Referee: Tahar Boudjemaa; VAR: Mustapha Ghorbal

2 December 2024 Round 11	JS Saoura	1–1	JS Kabylie	Béchar
16:00	Akacem 30' (pen.)	Report	Bwalya 2'	Stadium: 20 August 1955 Stadium; Referee: Youcef Gamouh

13 December 2024 Round 13	JS Saoura	1–1	ASO Chlef	Béchar
16:00	Ghorab 35'	Report	Sadahine 90+7'	Stadium: 20 August 1955 Stadium; Referee: Lotfi Bekouassa

17 December 2024 Round 7	CR Belouizdad	3–0	JS Saoura	Algiers
16:30	Meziane 49'; Mahious 52'; Mayo 57'	Report		Stadium: Stade du 5 Juillet; Attendance: 0 (close doors); Referee: Fateh Harkat; VAR: Abderahmane Sahraoui

21 December 2024 Round 14	Paradou AC	2–0	JS Saoura	Algiers
16:00	Yattou 87'; Kohili 90+1'	Report		Stadium: Stade du 5 Juillet; Referee: Alaa Bouab

27 December 2024 Round 15	JS Saoura	2–0	CS Constantine	Béchar
16:00	Bouchiba 22'; Ghorab 64'	Report		Stadium: 20 August 1955 Stadium; Referee: Nabil Boukhalfa

29 January 2025 Round 12	MC Alger	1–0	JS Saoura	Algiers
17:00	Draoui 45+2'	Report		Stadium: Stade du 5 Juillet; Attendance: 0 (close doors); Referee: Abderahmane Sahraoui; VAR: Lahlou Benbraham

12 February 2025 Round 16	JS Saoura	2–0	MC Oran	Béchar
16:30	Bentaleb 80'; Saâdi 90+9' (pen.)	Report		Stadium: 20 August 1955 Stadium; Referee: Alaa Bouab

18 February 2025 Round 17	USM Khenchela	1–3	JS Saoura	Khenchela
15:30	Djaouchi 45+3'	Report	Bedi 40'; Bentaleb 76', 90+3'	Stadium: Amar Hamam Stadium; Attendance: 0 (close doors); Referee: Youcef Gamouh

27 February 2025 Round 18	JS Saoura	2–1	Olympique Akbou	Béchar
17:00	Akacem 58'; Zaâlani 79'	Report	Gherbi 24'	Stadium: 20 August 1955 Stadium; Referee: Mohamed Bouteraa

7 March 2025 Round 19	ES Sétif	1–0	JS Saoura	Sétif
22:00	Eduwo 90+4'	Report		Stadium: 8 May 1945 Stadium; Attendance: 0 (close doors); Referee: Fateh Harkat; VAR: Mehdi Oukil

14 March 2025 Round 20	JS Saoura	2–0	US Biskra	Béchar
22:00	Bedi 13', 73'	Report		Stadium: 20 August 1955 Stadium; Referee: Ayoub Belhachemi

5 April 2025 Round 21	MC El Bayadh	1–0	JS Saoura	El Bayadh
16:00	Barkat 89'	Report		Stadium: Zakaria Medjdoub Stadium; Referee: Tayeb Benyabka

10 April 2025 Round 22	JS Saoura	1–3	CR Belouizdad	Béchar
19:00	Saâdi 47'	Report	Laouafi 8' (pen.); Boukerchaoui 13'; Boussouar 83'	Stadium: 20 August 1955 Stadium; Referee: Abdelali Ibrir

18 April 2025 Round 23	NC Magra	2–0	JS Saoura	Magra
15:30	Djabout 69' (pen.); Harrari 90+4'	Report		Stadium: Boucheligue Brothers Stadium; Referee: Anes Azrine

26 April 2025 Round 24	JS Saoura	2–1	USM Alger	Béchar
18:00	Boutiche 34'; Akacem 67' (pen.)	Report	Alilet 58' (pen.)	Stadium: 20 August 1955 Stadium; Referee: Rafik Aouina

10 May 2025 Round 25	JS Saoura	0–0	ES Mostaganem	Béchar
18:00		Report		Stadium: 20 August 1955 Stadium; Referee: Lotfi Bekouassa

17 May 2025 Round 26	JS Kabylie	1–2	JS Saoura	Tizi Ouzou
17:00	Lahmeri 14'	Report	Souibaâh 38'; Allaoui 45+7'	Stadium: Hocine Aït Ahmed Stadium; Referee: Tahar Boudjemaa; VAR: Akram Mechairia

27 May 2025 Round 27	JS Saoura	0–0	MC Alger	Béchar
19:00		Report		Stadium: 20 August 1955 Stadium; Referee: Alaa Bouab

11 June 2025 Round 28	ASO Chlef	1–2	JS Saoura	Chlef
17:00	Agbagno 73'	Report	Boutiche 5'; Fettouhi 90+1'	Stadium: Mohamed Boumezrag Stadium; Referee: Anes Azrine

17 June 2025 Round 29	JS Saoura	3–2	Paradou AC	Béchar
20:00	Boutiche 53' (pen.); Bédi 64'; Souibaâh 90+4'	Report	Kermiche 45+7'; Bendouma 87'	Stadium: 20 August 1955 Stadium; Referee: Tayeb Benyabka

20 June 2025 Round 30	CS Constantine	2–2	JS Saoura	Constantine
18:00	Temine 38'; Bouteldja 74'	Report	Bédi 45+2'; Bentaleb 80'	Stadium: Chahid Hamlaoui Stadium; Referee: Redouane Allou

=== Algerian Cup ===
2 January 2025 Round of 64	JS Saoura	2–1 (a.e.t.)	USM Khenchela	Béchar
15:00	Bentaleb 97'; Taib 114'	Report	Bakir 118'	Stadium: 20 August 1955 Stadium; Referee: Smain Hamlet

14 January 2025 Round of 32	RC Kouba	2–1	JS Saoura	Kouba
18:00	Ghodbane 29', 44'	Report	Souibaâh 73'	Stadium: Mohamed Benhaddad Stadium; Referee: Djamel Eddine Zenati

== Squad information ==
=== Appearances and goals ===
No.	Pos	Player	Nat	Ligue 1			Algerian Cup			Total		
No.	Pos	Player	Nat	App	St	G	App	St	G	App	St	G
Goalkeepers
1	GK	Abdennasser Djoudar	(Algeria)	16	16	0	2	2	0	18	18	0
12	GK	Abdelkader Morcely	(Algeria)	1	1	0	0	0	0	1	1	0
16	GK	Mohamed Zakaria Haouli	(Algeria)	3	2	0	0	0	0	3	2	0
Defenders
2	CB	Riyane Akacem	(Algeria)	25	25	4	2	2	0	27	27	4
4	CB	Fayçal Mebarki	(Algeria)	18	16	0	0	0	0	18	16	0
6	LB	Rafik Brahimi	(Algeria)	21	17	0	2	2	0	23	19	0
13	CB	Nasreddine Zaalani	(Algeria)	11	11	1	0	0	0	11	11	1
14	CB	Ilyes Haddouche	(Algeria)	16	11	1	1	1	0	17	12	1
17	CB	Mohamed Amrane	(Algeria)	11	8	0	1	1	0	12	9	0
22	RB	Mohamed Azzedine Berriah	(Algeria)	11	11	0	0	0	0	11	11	0
24	RB	Abdenour Barkat	(Algeria)	14	12	0	2	2	0	16	14	0
Midfielders
5	DM	Abdelkader Boutiche	(Algeria)	29	29	5	2	2	0	31	31	5
8	CM	Massinissa Benchelouche	(Algeria)	11	3	0	0	0	0	11	3	0
18	CM	Juba Oukaci	(Algeria)	10	7	0	0	0	0	10	7	0
20	DM	Sid Ahmed Matallah	(Algeria)	11	11	0	0	0	0	11	11	0
25	DM	Adel Bouchiba	(Algeria)	27	23	1	2	1	0	29	24	1
27	AM	Mohamed Taib	(Algeria)	13	7	0	2	0	1	15	7	1
38	DM	Khaled Mounir Allaoui	(Algeria)	14	9	1	1	1	0	15	10	1
Forwards
7	RW	Kamel Belmiloud	(Algeria)	21	15	2	2	2	0	23	17	2
9	ST	Guy Stéphane Bédi	(Ivory Coast)	14	12	5	0	0	0	14	12	5
10	RW	Nour El Islam Fettouhi	(Algeria)	16	10	1	2	1	0	18	11	1
11	ST	Mohamed Souibaâh	(Algeria)	21	10	3	1	0	1	22	10	4
15	LW	Ismail Saadi	(Algeria)	25	17	3	1	1	0	26	18	3
19	ST	Mohamed Ayoub Belhachemi	(Algeria)	9	6	0	1	1	0	10	7	0
21	RW	Oussama Bentaleb	(Algeria)	25	0	5	2	1	1	27	1	6
23	LW	Abdelkader Ghorab	(Algeria)	23	16	2	2	2	0	25	18	2
26	LW	Mohamed El Amine Hammia	(Algeria)	13	3	0	1	0	0	14	3	0
Players transferred out during the season
~~13~~	GK	Walid Ouabdi	(Algeria)	11	11	0	0	0	0	11	11	0
~~3~~	LB	Moncef Merouani	(Algeria)	4	4	0	0	0	0	4	4	0
~~12~~	CM	Abdeldjalil Ould Ammar	(Algeria)	2	0	0	0	0	0	2	0	0
~~20~~	AM	Yacine Medane	(Algeria)	8	7	0	0	0	0	8	7	0
~~9~~	ST	Abbes Hamek	(Algeria)	1	0	0	0	0	0	1	0	0
Total				30		34	2		3	32		37

Last updated: 20 June 2025
Source: soccerway.com

=== Goalscorers ===
Includes all competitive matches.

No.	Nat.	Player	Pos.	L1	AC	TOTAL
21	(Algeria)	Oussama Bentaleb	RW	5	1	6
5	(Algeria)	Abdelkader Boutiche	DM	5	0	5
9	(Ivory Coast)	Guy Stéphane Bédi	ST	5	0	5
2	(Algeria)	Riyane Akacem	CB	4	0	4
11	(Algeria)	Mohamed Souibaâh	ST	3	1	4
15	(Algeria)	Ismail Saadi	LW	3	0	3
7	(Algeria)	Kamel Belmiloud	RW	2	0	2
23	(Algeria)	Abdelkader Ghorab	LW	2	0	2
13	(Algeria)	Nasreddine Zaalani	CB	1	0	1
14	(Algeria)	Ilyes Faical Haddouche	CB	1	0	1
38	(Algeria)	Khaled Mounir Allaoui	DM	1	0	1
25	(Algeria)	Adel Bouchiba	DM	1	0	1
10	(Algeria)	Nour El Islam Fettouhi	RW	1	0	1
27	(Algeria)	Mohamed Taib	AM	0	1	1
Own Goals				0	0	0
Totals				34	3	37

=== Clean sheets ===
					Clean sheets		
No.	Nat	Name	GP	GA	L1	AC	Total
1	(Algeria)	Abdennasser Djoudar	18	16	5	0	5
12	(Algeria)	Abdelkader Morcely	1	3	0	0	0
16	(Algeria)	Mohamed Zakaria Haouli	3	4	1	0	1
Players transferred out during the season
13	(Algeria)	Walid Ouabdi	11	16	2	0	2
		TOTALS		39	8	0	8
