= 2025–26 JS Saoura season =

JS Saoura
2025–26 season
- Owner: ENAFOR
- President: Mourad Belakhdar
- Head coach: Lotfi Boudraa (from 19 July 2025) (until 11 November 2025); Abdelkader Amrani (from 30 December 2025)
- Stadium: 20 August 1955 Stadium
- Ligue 1: 2nd
- Algerian Cup: Quarter-finals
- Top goalscorer: League: Abdelkader Boutiche (8 goals); All: Abdelkader Boutiche (9 goals)
- Biggest win: ES Mostaganem 0–4 JS Saoura
- Biggest defeat: USM Khenchela 3–0 JS Saoura
Home colours	Away colours	Third colours

The 2025–26 season, is JS Saoura's 13th consecutive season in the top flight of Algerian football. In addition to the domestic league, USM Alger are participating in this season's editions of the Algerian Cup. The Algerian Professional Football League (LFP) officially released the calendar for the 2025–26 Ligue 1 Mobilis season on July 10, 2025. The Ligue 1 will kick off on Thursday, August 21, 2025, and conclude with the 30th and final matchday on May 16, 2026. As in recent years, league matches will be held every Thursday, Friday, and Saturday, offering better scheduling balance and improved logistical conditions for clubs and broadcasters.

== Squad list ==
Players and squad numbers last updated on 31 January 2026.
Note: Flags indicate national team as has been defined under FIFA eligibility rules. Players may hold more than one non-FIFA nationality.

No.	Nat.	Name	Position	Date of birth (age)	Signed from
Goalkeepers
1	(Algeria)	Abdelkader Salhi	GK	19 March 1993 (aged 32)	(Algeria) MC El Bayadh
16	(Algeria)	Zakaria Seggari	GK	26 June 2004 (aged 21)	(Algeria) Reserve team
30	(Algeria)	Mohamed Merhab	GK	1 February 2005 (aged 20)	(Algeria) Reserve team
Defenders
2	(Algeria)	Riyane Akacem	CB	13 February 1999 (aged 26)	(Algeria) Reserve team
4	(Algeria)	Fayçal Mebarki	CB	31 August 2000 (aged 24)	(Algeria) Reserve team
6	(Algeria)	Hamza Mouali	LB	16 January 1998 (aged 27)	(Algeria) JS Kabylie
13	(Algeria)	Nasreddine Zaalani	CB	26 July 1992 (aged 33)	(Bahrain) Al-Khaldiya SC
14	(Algeria)	Ilyes Haddouche	CB	1 July 1998 (aged 27)	(Algeria) ES Ben Aknoun
15	(Algeria)	Issameddine Tahouri	CB	11 October 2006 (aged 18)	(Algeria) Reserve team
24	(Algeria)	Abdenour Barkat	RB	26 July 2003 (aged 22)	(Algeria) Reserve team
Midfielders
5	(Algeria)	Abdelkader Boutiche	DM	26 October 1996 (aged 28)	(Algeria) ES Ben Aknoun
8	(Algeria)	Abdelhak Khoumani	AM	11 March 2004 (aged 21)	(Algeria) Reserve team
17	(Algeria)	Mohamed Goumaidi	AM	15 April 2005 (aged 20)	(Algeria) RA Aïn Defla
19	(Ivory Coast)	Constant Wayou	AM	20 December 1996 (aged 28)	(Ivory Coast) FC San Pédro
20	(Algeria)	Sid Ahmed Matallah	DM	14 January 1996 (aged 29)	(Algeria) JS Kabylie
22	(Algeria)	Housseyn Selmi	DM	11 February 1993 (aged 32)	(Algeria) CR Belouizdad
23	(Algeria)	Khaled Allaoui	DM	24 July 2004 (aged 21)	(Algeria) Reserve team
25	(Algeria)	Adel Bouchiba	DM	10 November 1988 (aged 36)	(Algeria) Olympique de Médéa
27	(Algeria)	Mostapha Badaoui	DM	17 October 2006 (aged 18)	(Algeria) Reserve team
Forwards
7	(Algeria)	Laid Ayad	ST	21 September 2006 (aged 18)	(Algeria) Reserve team
9	(Ivory Coast)	Stéphane Bédi	ST	20 December 1995 (aged 29)	(Ivory Coast) FC San Pédro
10	(Algeria)	Nour El Islam Fettouhi	RW	28 August 1999 (aged 25)	(Algeria) USM Alger
11	(Algeria)	Ismail Saadi	LW	4 April 1997 (aged 28)	(Algeria) ES Sétif
21	(Algeria)	Oussama Bentaleb	RW	12 October 2001 (aged 23)	(Algeria) JS Guir
26	(Nigeria)	Anas Yusuf	LW	1 February 2004 (aged 21)	(Nigeria) Nasarawa United
29	(Nigeria)	Sikiru Alimi	ST	23 March 1996 (aged 29)	(Nigeria) Remo Stars

== Transfers ==
=== In ===
==== Summer ====
Date	Pos	Player	Moving from	Fee	Source
19 July 2025	AM	(Ivory Coast) Constant Wayou	(Ivory Coast) FC San Pédro	Free transfer	
28 August 2025	DM	(Ivory Coast) Semelo Gueï	Unattached	Free transfer	

==== Winter ====
Date	Pos	Player	Moving from	Fee	Source
24 January 2026	AM	(Algeria) Mohamed Goumaidi	RA Aïn Defla	Free transfer	
27 January 2026	LB	(Algeria) Hamza Mouali	JS Kabylie	Loan	
31 January 2026	GK	(Algeria) Abdelkader Salhi	MC El Bayadh	Undisclosed	
31 January 2026	LW	(Nigeria) Anas Yusuf	(Nigeria) Nasarawa United	Undisclosed	
31 January 2026	DM	(Algeria) Housseyn Selmi	Unattached	Free transfer	

=== Out ===
==== Summer ====
Date	Pos	Player	Moving to	Fee	Source
14 July 2025	GK	(Algeria) Abdelkader Morcely	USM Khenchela	Free transfer	
28 July 2025	ST	(Algeria) Mohamed Souibaâh	ES Ben Aknoun	Free transfer	

==== Winter ====
Date	Pos	Player	Moving to	Fee	Source
14 January 2026	RW	(Algeria) Farouk Laoufi	Olympique Akbou	Free transfer	
29 January 2026	GK	(Algeria) Abdennasser Djoudar	Unattached	Free transfer (Released)	
29 January 2026	DM	(Ivory Coast) Semelo Gueï	Unattached	Free transfer (Released)	
29 January 2026	CM	(Algeria) Juba Oukaci	Unattached	Free transfer (Released)	
31 January 2026	LW	(Algeria) Mohamed El Amine Hammia	Unattached	Free transfer (Released)	
31 January 2026	LB	(Algeria) Rafik Brahimi	ES Ben Aknoun	Free transfer	

== Pre-season and friendlies ==
30 July 2025 Friendly	Algeria A'	0–1	JS Saoura	Blida
19:00 UTC+1		Report		Stadium: Mustapha Tchaker Stadium

5 August 2025 Friendly	RC Kouba	0–0	JS Saoura	Kouba
20:00 UTC+1		Report		Stadium: Mohamed Benhaddad Stadium

7 August 2025 Friendly	JS Saoura	1–0	MC Oran	Ben Aknoun
17:30 UTC+1	Boutiche	Report		Stadium: Stade El Mokrani

12 August 2025 Friendly	JS Saoura	0–0	Olympique Akbou	Oran
18:00 UTC+1		Report		Stadium: Ahmed Zabana Stadium

== Competitions ==
=== Overview ===
Competition	Record								Started round	Final position / round	First match	Last match
Competition	G	W	D	L	GF	GA	GD	Win %	Started round	Final position / round	First match	Last match
Ligue 1	30	16	7	7	40	26	+14	53.33	—N/a	2nd	21 August 2025	5 June 2026
Algerian Cup	4	3	0	1	5	1	+4	75.00	Round of 64	Quarter-finals	6 December 2025	4 March 2026
Total	34	19	7	8	45	27	+18	55.88				

Updated to match played 5 June 2026
Source: Competitions

=== Ligue 1 ===
==== League table ====
Pos	Team	Pld	W	D	L	GF	GA	GD	Pts	Qualification or relegation
1	MC Alger (C)	30	20	5	5	41	18	+23	65	Qualification for CAF Champions League
2	JS Saoura	30	16	7	7	40	26	+14	55	Qualification for CAF Champions League
3	CR Belouizdad	30	14	11	5	47	24	+23	53	Qualification for CAF Confederation Cup
4	MC Oran	30	14	7	9	36	31	+5	49	
5	JS Kabylie	30	11	12	7	40	31	+9	45	

Source: lfp.dz
Rules for classification: 1) Points; 2) Head-to-head points; 3) Head-to-head goal difference; 4) First half goal difference; 5) First half total goals; 6) Fairplay ranking; 7) Playoff.
(C) Champions

==== Results summary ====
Overall								Home						Away					
Pld	W	D	L	GF	GA	GD	Pts	W	D	L	GF	GA	GD	W	D	L	GF	GA	GD
30	16	7	7	40	26	+14	55	11	2	2	26	13	+13	5	5	5	14	13	+1

Last updated: 5 June 2026.
Source: Competitive matches

==== Results by round ====
Round	1	2	3	4	5	6	7	8	9	10	11	12	13	14	15	16	17	18	19	20	21	22	23	24	25	26	27	28	29	30
Ground	H	A	H	A	H	A	H	A	H	A	H	A	H	H	A	A	H	A	H	A	H	A	H	A	H	A	H	A	A	H
Result	L	D	W	W	W	D	W	D	D	L	L	L	W	W	L	L	W	W	D	W	W	L	W	W	W	D	W	W	D	W
Position	14	14	10	4	3	3	2	2	3	7	8	9	8	6	8	10	6	5	5	4	3	7	3	2	2	2	2	2	2	2

Updated to match(es) played on 5 June 2026. Source: Competitive matches
A = Away; H = Home; W = Win; D = Draw; L = Loss

==== Matches ====
The league fixtures were announced on 31 July 2025.

All times are local, WAT (UTC+1).

Win Draw Loss Postponed

21 August 2025 Round 1	JS Saoura	1–2	MB Rouissat	Béchar
20:00	Zeghad 69' (o.g.)	Soccerway; LFP	Benkheira 48'; Rahmani 89'	Stadium: 20 August 1955 Stadium; Referee: Ismail Hamlat

29 August 2025 Round 2	ES Sétif	1–1	JS Saoura	Sétif
19:00	Biramahire 52' (pen.)	Soccerway; LFP	Wayou 65'	Stadium: 8 May 1945 Stadium; Attendance: 0 (close doors); Referee: Akram Mechairia

5 September 2025 Round 3	JS Saoura	1–0	ASO Chlef	Béchar
20:00	Hammia 22'	Soccerway; LFP		Stadium: 20 August 1955 Stadium; Referee: Youcef Taieb Bouderbal

13 September 2025 Round 4	CR Belouizdad	1–2	JS Saoura	Constantine (Note: CR Belouizdad host JS Saoura at the Chahid Hamlaoui Stadium in Constantine, due to the closure of the Stade du 5 Juillet and Nelson Mandela Stadium for renovations.)
19:00	Belhocini 25'	Soccerway; LFP	Boutiche 27'; Akacem 85'	Stadium: Chahid Hamlaoui Stadium; Attendance: 0 (close doors); Referee: Nabil Boukhalfa

20 September 2025 Round 5	JS Saoura	1–0	USM Alger	Béchar
17:30	Hammia 7'	Soccerway; LFP		Stadium: 20 August 1955 Stadium; Referee: Ayoub Belhachemi

27 September 2025 Round 6	ES Ben Aknoun	1–1	JS Saoura	Belouizdad
16:00	Hachoud 39'	Soccerway; LFP	Boutiche 26'	Stadium: 20 August 1955 Stadium; Referee: Fateh Harkat; VAR: Akram Mechairia

4 October 2025 Round 7	JS Saoura	3–2	Olympique Akbou	Béchar
17:00	Sikiru 15', 90+2'; Boutiche 56' (pen.)	Soccerway; LFP	Gherbi 45'; Sediri 47'	Stadium: 20 August 1955 Stadium; Referee: Houssam Benyahia

18 October 2025 Round 8	MC Oran	1–1	JS Saoura	Bir El Djir
18:00	Hamra 18'	Soccerway; LFP	Boutiche 90+13' (pen.)	Stadium: Miloud Hadefi Stadium; Referee: Rafiq Aouina

29 October 2025 Round 9	JS Saoura	2–2	JS Kabylie	Béchar
16:00	Fettouhi 67'; Boutiche 81' (pen.)	Soccerway; LFP	Mahious 47'; Akacem 57' (o.g.)	Stadium: 20 August 1955 Stadium; Referee: Yahia Dahar

3 November 2025 Round 10	MC Alger	1–0	JS Saoura	Douéra
20:00	Bouguerra 66'	Soccerway; LFP		Stadium: Ali La Pointe Stadium; Referee: Youcef Gamouh

9 November 2025 Round 11	JS Saoura	1–2	Paradou AC	Béchar
18:00	Bentaleb 55'	Soccerway; LFP	Ramdaoui 2'; Kermiche 39'	Stadium: 20 August 1955 Stadium; Referee: Ayoub Belhachemi

22 November 2025 Round 12	USM Khenchela	3–0	JS Saoura	Khenchela
14:00	Oukil 33'; Boumechra 76', 79'	Soccerway; LFP		Stadium: Amar Hamam Stadium; Referee: Tahar Boudjemaa

20 December 2025 Round 13	JS Saoura	3–2	ES Mostaganem	Béchar
15:00	Bentaleb 5'; Boualleg 31' (o.g.); Boutiche 45+1' (pen.)	Soccerway; LFP	Motrani 58'; Boulkaboul 85'	Stadium: 20 August 1955 Stadium; Referee: Haitham Ghouti

26 December 2025 Round 14	JS Saoura	2–1	MC El Bayadh	Béchar
15:00	Mebarki 8'; Akacem 30'	Soccerway; LFP	Keniche 57'	Stadium: 20 August 1955 Stadium; Referee: Anes Azrine

9 January 2026 Round 15	CS Constantine	1–0	JS Saoura	Constantine
16:00	Dib 89'	Soccerway; LFP		Stadium: Chahid Hamlaoui Stadium; Referee: Tahar Boudjemaa

24 January 2026 Round 16	MB Rouissat	1–0	JS Saoura	Ouargla
14:00	Merzougui 34'	Soccerway; LFP		Stadium: 18 February Stadium; Referee: Rafik Aouina

4 February 2026 Round 17	JS Saoura	1–0	ES Sétif	Béchar
16:00	Boutiche 76' (pen.)	Soccerway; LFP		Stadium: 20 August 1955 Stadium; Referee: Mohamed Chaoubi

8 February 2026 Round 18	ASO Chlef	0–1	JS Saoura	Chlef
16:00		Soccerway; LFP	Bentaleb 30'	Stadium: Mohamed Boumezrag Stadium; Referee: Akram Mechairia

21 February 2026 Round 20	USM Alger	1–2	JS Saoura	Algiers
22:00	Ghacha 60' (pen.)	Soccerway; LFP	Bentaleb 8', 39'	Stadium: Stade du 5 Juillet; Referee: Tayeb Benyabka

27 February 2026 Round 21	JS Saoura	1–0	ES Ben Aknoun	Béchar
22:00	Fettouhi 66'	Soccerway; LFP		Stadium: 20 August 1955 Stadium; Referee: Abdellali Ibrir

8 March 2026 Round 22	Olympique Akbou	1–0	JS Saoura	Béjaïa
15:00	Mehdaoui 22'	Soccerway; LFP		Stadium: Maghrebi Unity Stadium; Referee: Alaa Bouab

13 March 2026 Round 23	JS Saoura	2–0	MC Oran	Béchar
22:00	Yusuf 35'; Bentaleb 90+6'	Soccerway; LFP		Stadium: 20 August 1955 Stadium; Referee: Mehdi Oukil

18 March 2026 Round 24	JS Kabylie	0–1	JS Saoura	Tizi Ouzou
22:00		Soccerway; LFP	Boutiche 39'	Stadium: Hocine Aït Ahmed Stadium; Referee: Mustapha Ghorbal

5 April 2026 Round 25	JS Saoura	2–1	MC Alger	Béchar
20:00	Zaalani 45+1'; Saadi 81'	Soccerway; LFP	Naidji 16'	Stadium: 20 August 1955 Stadium; Referee: Youcef Taieb Bouderbal

11 April 2026 Round 26	Paradou AC	1–1	JS Saoura	Belouizdad
15:00	Bendouma 76'	Soccerway; LFP	Saadi 33'	Stadium: 20 August 1955 Stadium; Referee: Haitham Ghouti

17 April 2026 Round 27	JS Saoura	3–0	USM Khenchela	Béchar
17:45	Wayou 45+1'; Saadi 54'; Fettouhi 85'	Soccerway; LFP		Stadium: 20 August 1955 Stadium; Referee: Lotfi Bekouassa

7 May 2026 Round 28	ES Mostaganem	0–4	JS Saoura	Mostaganem
16:00		Soccerway; LFP	Saadi 22'; Sikiru 27', 51'; Fettouhi 28'	Stadium: Mohamed Bensaïd Stadium; Referee: Sid Ahmed Lellouchi

12 May 2026 Round 19	JS Saoura	0–0	CR Belouizdad	Béchar
20:00		Soccerway; LFP		Stadium: 20 August 1955 Stadium; Referee: Yahia Dahar

20 May 2026 Round 29	MC El Bayadh	0–0	JS Saoura	El Bayadh
17:45		Soccerway; LFP		Stadium: Zakaria Medjdoub Stadium; Referee: Naïm Bouara

5 June 2026 Round 30	JS Saoura	3–1	CS Constantine	Béchar
20:00	Saadi 14', 23', 58'	Soccerway; LFP	Omoyele 45'	Stadium: 20 August 1955 Stadium; Referee: Hichem Benokba

=== Algerian Cup ===
6 December 2025 Round of 64	NRB Bethioua	0–1	JS Saoura	Bethioua
14:00		Report	Boutiche 37'	Stadium: Mohamed Cerra Cheraka Stadium; Referee: Oussama Mekfoudji

13 December 2025 Round of 32	JS Saoura	2–0	AS Khroub	Béchar
15:00	Bentaleb 85', 88'	Report		Stadium: 20 August 1955 Stadium; Referee: Mohamed Beloufa

15 January 2026 Round of 16	ES Mostaganem	0–2	JS Saoura	Chlef
16:00		Report	Akacem 37'; Allaoui 30'	Stadium: Mohamed Boumezrag Stadium; Referee: Mohamed Chaoubi

4 March 2026 Quarter-finals	USM Alger	1–0	JS Saoura	Algiers
22:00	Radouani 36'	Report		Stadium: Stade du 5 Juillet; Referee: Akram Mechairia; VAR: Yahia Dahar

== Squad information ==
=== Appearances and goals ===
As of 5 June 2026

No.	Pos	Player	Nat	Ligue 1			Algerian Cup			Total		
No.	Pos	Player	Nat	App	St	G	App	St	G	App	St	G
Goalkeepers
1	GK	Abdelkader Salhi	(Algeria)	12	11	0	1	1	0	13	12	0
16	GK	Zakaria Seggari	(Algeria)	16	16	0	2	2	0	18	18	0
30	GK	Mohamed Merhab	(Algeria)	1	1	0	1	1	0	0	0	0
Defenders
2	CB	Riyane Akacem	(Algeria)	27	27	2	4	4	1	31	31	3
4	CB	Fayçal Mebarki	(Algeria)	18	12	1	3	3	0	21	15	1
6	LB	Hamza Mouali	(Algeria)	13	11	0	1	1	0	14	12	0
13	CB	Nasreddine Zaalani	(Algeria)	25	23	1	2	2	0	27	25	1
14	CB	Ilyes Haddouche	(Algeria)	23	18	0	2	1	0	25	19	0
15	CB	Issameddine Tahouri	(Algeria)	0	0	0	1	0	0	1	0	0
24	RB	Abdenour Barkat	(Algeria)	24	16	0	4	2	0	28	18	0
Midfielders
5	DM	Abdelkader Boutiche	(Algeria)	24	20	8	4	4	1	28	24	9
8	AM	Abdelhak Khoumani	(Algeria)	6	3	0	3	1	0	9	4	0
17	AM	Mohamed Goumaidi	(Algeria)	1	0	0	0	0	0	1	0	0
19	AM	Constant Wayou	(Ivory Coast)	28	22	2	3	3	0	31	25	2
20	DM	Sid Ahmed Matallah	(Algeria)	20	14	0	2	1	0	22	15	0
22	DM	Housseyn Selmi	(Algeria)	12	10	0	1	1	0	13	11	0
23	DM	Khaled Allaoui	(Algeria)	24	18	0	2	2	1	26	20	1
25	DM	Adel Bouchiba	(Algeria)	20	5	0	2	0	0	22	5	0
27	DM	Mostapha Badaoui	(Algeria)	2	0	0	2	2	0	4	2	0
Forwards
7	ST	Laid Ayad	(Algeria)	8	1	0	1	1	0	9	2	0
9	ST	Stéphane Bédi	(Ivory Coast)	10	6	0	1	1	0	11	7	0
10	RW	Nour El Islam Fettouhi	(Algeria)	25	21	4	4	4	0	29	25	4
11	LW	Ismail Saadi	(Algeria)	26	20	7	2	1	0	28	21	7
21	RW	Oussama Bentaleb	(Algeria)	27	16	6	3	3	2	30	19	8
26	LW	Anas Yusuf	(Nigeria)	9	3	1	1	0	0	10	3	1
29	ST	Sikiru Alimi	(Nigeria)	22	14	4	2	1	0	24	15	4
Players transferred out during the season
~~1~~	GK	Abdennasser Djoudar	(Algeria)	2	2	0	1	1	0	3	3	0
~~12~~	DM	Semelo Gueï	(Ivory Coast)	9	1	0	3	0	0	12	1	0
~~17~~	RW	Farouk Laoufi	(Algeria)	4	0	0	0	0	0	4	0	0
~~18~~	CM	Juba Oukaci	(Algeria)	8	3	0	0	0	0	8	3	0
~~26~~	LW	Mohamed El Amine Hammia	(Algeria)	13	9	2	1	0	0	14	9	2
~~6~~	LB	Rafik Brahimi	(Algeria)	9	8	0	2	2	0	11	10	0
Total				30		40	4		5	34		45

Last updated: 5 June 2026
Source: soccerway.com

=== Goalscorers ===
As of 5 June 2026

Includes all competitive matches.

No.	Nat.	Player	Pos.	L1	AC	TOTAL
5	(Algeria)	Abdelkader Boutiche	DM	8	1	9
11	(Algeria)	Ismail Saadi	LW	7	0	7
21	(Algeria)	Oussama Bentaleb	RW	6	2	8
10	(Algeria)	Nour El Islam Fettouhi	RW	4	0	4
29	(Nigeria)	Sikiru Alimi	ST	4	0	4
2	(Algeria)	Riyane Akacem	CB	2	1	3
19	(Ivory Coast)	Constant Wayou	AM	2	0	2
4	(Algeria)	Fayçal Mebarki	CB	1	0	1
23	(Algeria)	Khaled Allaoui	DM	0	1	1
26	(Nigeria)	Anas Yusuf	ST	1	0	1
13	(Algeria)	Nasreddine Zaalani	CB	1	0	1
Players transferred out during the season
~~26~~	(Algeria)	Mohamed El Amine Hammia	LW	2	0	2
Own Goals				2	0	2
Totals				40	5	45

=== Clean sheets ===
As of 5 June 2026

Includes all competitive matches.

					Clean sheets		
No.	Nat	Name	GP	GA	L 1	AC	Total
1	(Algeria)	Abdelkader Salhi	12	5	7	0	7
16	(Algeria)	Zakaria Seggari	18	17	4	2	6
30	(Algeria)	Mohamed Merhab	2	1	0	1	1
Players transferred out during the season
~~1~~	(Algeria)	Abdennasser Djoudar	2	4	0	0	0
		TOTALS		27	11	3	14
