= 2023–24 JS Saoura season =

JS Saoura
2023–24 season
- Owner: ENAFOR
- President: Mamoune Hamlili (from 27 July 2023)
- Head coach: Cherif Hadjar (from 25 July 2023) (until 20 November 2023); Nacif Beyaoui (from 22 November 2023) (until 17 February 2024); Fouad Bouali (3 March 2024)
- Stadium: 20 August 1955 Stadium
- Ligue 1: 9th
- Algerian Cup: Round of 32
- Top goalscorer: League: Mohamed Souibaâh; Oussama Bellatreche (6 goals); All: Mohamed Souibaâh; Oussama Bellatreche (6 goals)
- Biggest win: JS Saoura 6–0 US Souf
- Biggest defeat: MC Alger 4–0 JS Saoura
Home colours	Away colours

The 2023–24 season, is JS Saoura's 12th consecutive season in the top flight of Algerian football. In addition to the domestic league, JS Saoura are participating in the Algerian Cup.

== Squad list ==
Players and squad numbers last updated on 5 February 2024.
Note: Flags indicate national team as has been defined under FIFA eligibility rules. Players may hold more than one non-FIFA nationality.

No.	Nat.	Position	Name	Date of Birth (Age)	Signed from
Goalkeepers
1	(Algeria)	GK	Abdennasser Djoudar	11 March 2001 (aged 22)	(Algeria) MCB Oued Sly
13	(Algeria)	GK	Aymen Mouyet	17 May 1999 (aged 24)	(Algeria) ES Sétif
16	(Algeria)	GK	Walid Ouabdi	12 June 1995 (aged 28)	(Algeria) US Biskra
Defenders
2	(Algeria)	CB	Riyane Akacem	13 February 1999 (aged 24)	(Algeria) Youth system
3	(Algeria)	LB	Marwane Khelif	8 February 2000 (aged 23)	(Algeria) Youth system
4	(Algeria)	RB	Fayçal Mebarki	31 August 2000 (aged 23)	(Algeria) Youth system
5	(Algeria)	CB	Benali Benamar	January 12, 1995 (aged 28)	(Algeria) MC Oran
14	(Algeria)	LB	Rabah Haddadou	16 September 1999 (aged 24)	(Algeria) JS Bordj Ménaïel
17	(Algeria)	CB	Mohamed Amrane	27 January 1994 (aged 29)	(Algeria) CA Bordj Bou Arreridj
22	(Algeria)	CB	Amine Benmiloud	7 January 2001 (aged 22)	(Algeria) Youth system
Midfielders
6	(Algeria)	MF	Khathir Baaziz	17 January 1995 (aged 28)	(Algeria) ASO Chlef
7	(Algeria)	MF	Abdeldjalil Taki Eddine Saâd	12 March 1992 (aged 31)	(Algeria) MC Saida
8	(Algeria)	MF	Ilyes Atallah	19 August 2001 (aged 22)	(Algeria) NC Magra
19	(Algeria)	MF	Mosleh Khenoussi	20 December 2000 (aged 22)	(Algeria) USM Annaba
24	(Algeria)	MF	Tahir Nadir Boudouhiou	7 August 1996 (aged 27)	(Algeria) JSM Tiaret
25	(Algeria)	MF	Adel Bouchiba	10 November 1988 (aged 34)	(Algeria) Olympique de Médéa
26	(Algeria)	MF	Mohamed El Amine Hammia	21 December 1991 (aged 31)	(Algeria) USM Blida
27	(Algeria)	MF	Mohamed Taib	20 April 1994 (aged 29)	(Algeria) RC Arbaâ
Forwards
9	(Algeria)	FW	Abdelhak Abdelhafid	14 December 1991 (aged 31)	(Algeria) CS Constantine
10	(Algeria)	FW	Nour El Islam Fettouhi	28 August 1999 (aged 24)	(Algeria) USM Alger
11	(Algeria)	FW	Mohamed Souibaâh	25 December 1991 (aged 31)	(Algeria) ASO Chlef
12	(Republic of the Congo)	FW	Carl Wunda	21 July 1999 (aged 24)	(Republic of the Congo) Diables Noirs
15	(Algeria)	FW	Ismaïl Saadi	4 April 1997 (aged 26)	(Algeria) ES Sétif
21	(Algeria)	FW	Mohamed Amine Ouis	6 December 1992 (aged 30)	(Algeria) ASO Chlef
23	(Algeria)	FW	Cheikh Amieur	27 June 2001 (aged 22)	(Algeria) Youth system

== Transfers ==
=== In ===
==== Summer ====
Date	Pos	Player	Moving from	Fee	Source
23 July 2023	GK	(Algeria) Walid Ouabdi	US Biskra	Free transfer	
25 July 2023	DF	(Algeria) Benali Benamar	MC Oran	Free transfer	
30 July 2023	MF	(Algeria) Mosleh Khenoussi	USM Annaba	Free transfer	
30 July 2023	FW	(Algeria) Abdelhak Abdelhafid	CS Constantine	Free transfer	
30 July 2023	DF	(Algeria) Abderrahim Abdelli	SC Mécheria	Free transfer	
30 July 2023	MF	(Algeria) Ibrahim Farhi Benhalima	(Morocco) MC Oujda	Free transfer	
2 August 2023	DF	(Algeria) Ilyes Mosbahi	USM El Harrach	Free transfer	
2 August 2023	MF	(Algeria) Tahir Nadir Boudouhiou	JSM Tiaret	Free transfer	
4 August 2023	MF	(Algeria) Mohamed Taib	RC Arbaâ	Free transfer	
8 August 2023	GK	(Algeria) Abdennasser Djoudar	MCB Oued Sly	Free transfer	
14 August 2023	FW	(Algeria) Hicham Khalfallah	MC El Bayadh	Free transfer	
16 August 2023	DF	(Algeria) Abdelilah Bouanane	MC Saïda	Free transfer	

==== Winter ====
Date	Pos	Player	Moving from	Fee	Source
29 January 2024	FW	(Algeria) Nour El Islam Fettouhi	USM Alger	Free transfer	
5 February 2024	FW	(Algeria) Mohamed Souibaâh	ASO Chlef	Free transfer	
5 February 2024	DF	(Algeria) Rabah Haddadou	JS Bordj Ménaïel	Free transfer	
5 February 2024	MF	(Algeria) Ilyes Atallah	NC Magra	Free transfer	
5 February 2024	FW	(Algeria) Carl Wunda	(Republic of the Congo) Diables Noirs	Loan	

=== Out ===
==== Winter ====
Date	Pos	Player	Moving to	Fee	Source
24 July 2023	GK	(Algeria) Omar Hadji	Free agent	Free transfer (Released)	
24 July 2023	DF	(Algeria) Zakaria Zaitri	Free agent	Free transfer (Released)	
31 July 2023	DF	(Algeria) Oussama Bouziani	Free agent	Free transfer (Released)	
31 July 2023	DF	(Algeria) Mohamed Lamine Boutouala	Free agent	Free transfer (Released)	
1 August 2023	FW	(Algeria) Lyes Doucene	Free agent	Free transfer (Released)	
1 August 2023	MF	(Algeria) Houssem Bayoud	Free agent	Free transfer (Released)	
4 August 2023	MF	(Algeria) Benamar Mellal	Free agent	Free transfer (Released)	
4 August 2023	MF	(Algeria) Islam Eddine Kaidi	Free agent	Free transfer (Released)	
5 August 2023	MF	(Algeria) Karm Benkouider	Free agent	Free transfer (Released)	
5 August 2023	DF	(Algeria) Merzak Abaziz	Free agent	Free transfer (Released)	
11 August 2023	GK	(Algeria) Zakaria Saïdi	Free agent	Free transfer (Released)	
19 August 2023	FW	(Algeria) Aymen Lahmeri	ES Sétif	Loan	

==== Winter ====
Date	Pos	Player	Moving to	Fee	Source
9 January 2024	MF	(Algeria) Ibrahim Farhi Benhalima	Free agent	Free transfer (Released)	
9 January 2024	FW	(Algeria) Hicham Khalfallah	Free agent	Free transfer (Released)	
9 January 2024	DF	(Algeria) Ilyes Mosbahi	Free agent	Free transfer (Released)	
10 January 2024	FW	(Nigeria) Michael Oghwiche	Free agent	Free transfer (Released)	
29 January 2024	FW	(Algeria) Oussama Bellatreche	USM Alger	Undisclosed	
5 February 2024	FW	(Algeria) Dhiyaeddine Benyahia	ASO Chlef	Free transfer	

== Competitions ==
=== Overview ===
Competition	Record								Started round	Final position / round	First match	Last match
Competition	G	W	D	L	GF	GA	GD	Win %	Started round	Final position / round	First match	Last match
Ligue 1	30	11	7	12	34	37	−3	36.67	—N/a	9th	17 September 2023	14 June 2024
Algerian Cup	2	1	1	0	2	0	+2	50.00	Round of 64	Round of 32	3 February 2024	9 March 2024
Total	32	12	8	12	36	37	−1	37.50				

Updated to match played 14 June 2024
Source: Competitions

=== Ligue 1 ===
==== League table ====
Pos	Team	Pld	W	D	L	GF	GA	GD	Pts
7	JS Kabylie	30	10	12	8	33	27	+6	42
8	ASO Chlef	30	11	8	11	41	40	+1	41
9	JS Saoura	30	11	7	12	34	37	−3	40
10	USM Khenchela	30	11	6	13	33	39	−6	39
11	MC El Bayadh	30	10	8	12	29	30	−1	38

Source: the-sports.org
Rules for classification: 1) points; 2) head-to-head points; 3) head-to-head goal difference; 4) goal difference; 5) total goals; 6) fairplay ranking; 7) playoff.

==== Results summary ====
Overall								Home						Away					
Pld	W	D	L	GF	GA	GD	Pts	W	D	L	GF	GA	GD	W	D	L	GF	GA	GD
30	11	7	12	34	37	−3	40	8	4	3	24	14	+10	3	3	9	10	23	−13

Last updated: 14 June 2024.
Source: Competitive matches

==== Results by round ====
Round	1	2	3	4	5	6	7	8	9	10	11	12	13	14	15	16	17	18	19	20	21	22	23	24	25	26	27	28	29	30
Ground	H	A	H	A	H	A	H	H	A	H	A	H	A	H	A	A	H	A	H	A	H	A	A	H	A	H	A	H	A	H
Result	W	D	W	L	D	L	W	D	W	W	D	L	L	W	L	L	D	L	D	W	L	W	L	W	L	W	L	W	D	L
Position	5	3	3	7	7	11	6	8	4	4	4	8	10	7	9	10	11	11	11	10	11	9	10	8	8	8	8	7	6	9

Updated to match(es) played on 11 June 2024. Source: Competitive matches
A = Away; H = Home; W = Win; D = Draw; L = Loss

==== Matches ====
The league fixtures were announced on 24 August 2023.

All times are local, WAT (UTC+1).

Win Draw Loss Postponed

17 September 2023 Round 1	JS Saoura	1–0	US Biskra	Béchar
20:00	Bellatreche 31' (pen.)	Report		Stadium: 20 August 1955 Stadium; Referee: Billel Soltani

23 September 2023 Round 2	MC Oran	1–1	JS Saoura	Bir El Djir
19:00	Benamara 36'	Report	Bellatreche 5' (pen.)	Stadium: Miloud Hadefi Stadium; Referee: Youcef Gamouh

30 September 2023 Round 3	JS Saoura	1–0	ES Ben Aknoun	Béchar
19:00	Khalfallah 90+4'	Report		Stadium: 20 August 1955 Stadium; Referee: Rafik Aouina

6 October 2023 Round 4	CS Constantine	3–0	JS Saoura	Constantine
15:45	Belhocini 23'; Benchaâ 43'; Dib 60'	Report		Stadium: Ramadane Ben Abdelmalek Stadium; Referee: Lahlou Benbrahem

11 November 2023 Round 5	JS Saoura	0–0	MC El Bayadh	Béchar
18:00		Report		Stadium: 20 August 1955 Stadium; Referee: Nabil Boukhalfa

17 November 2023 Round 6	MC Alger	4–0	JS Saoura	Algiers
18:00	Naidji 19'; Belaïli 53', 90' (pen.); Merzougui 90+5'	Report		Stadium: Stade du 5 Juillet; Referee: Mustapha Ghorbal

25 November 2023 Round 7	JS Saoura	3–2	ASO Chlef	Béchar
17:45	Saâd 36'; Bellatreche 73' (pen.); Farhi 85'	Report	Agbagno 25', 45+5'	Stadium: 20 August 1955 Stadium; Referee: Mohamed Belekbir

2 December 2023 Round 8	JS Saoura	0–0	ES Sétif	Béchar
16:45		Report		Stadium: 20 August 1955 Stadium; Referee: Youcef Taieb Bouderbal

9 December 2023 Round 9	US Souf	0–1	JS Saoura	El Oued
15:00		Report	Bellatreche 85'	Stadium: 1 November 1954 Stadium; Referee: Nabil Boukhalfa

16 December 2023 Round 10	JS Saoura	2–1	NC Magra	Béchar
17:00	Saâd 41'; Abdelhafid 90+5' (pen.)	Report	Demane 61'	Stadium: 20 August 1955 Stadium; Referee: Mohamed Lamine Chaoubi

29 December 2023 Round 11	Paradou AC	0–0	JS Saoura	Dar El Beïda
15:15		Report		Stadium: Omar Benrabah Stadium; Referee: Akram Mechairia

6 January 2024 Round 12	JS Saoura	0–1	USM Khenchela	Béchar
16:00		Report	Kaddour 72'	Stadium: 20 August 1955 Stadium; Referee: Yahia Dahar

11 January 2024 Round 13	USM Alger	2–1	JS Saoura	Algiers
19:00	Belkacemi 89', 90+5'	Report	Bellatreche 28'	Stadium: Stade du 5 Juillet; Referee: Billel Soltani

19 January 2024 Round 14	JS Saoura	3–2	JS Kabylie	Béchar
16:00	Saâdi 69'; Benamar 90'; Bellatreche 90+10' (pen.)	Report	Mouaki 55', 63'	Stadium: 20 August 1955 Stadium; Referee: Abderrahmane Sahraoui

27 January 2024 Round 15	CR Belouizdad	3–1	JS Saoura	Algiers
18:00	Meziane 18'; Wamba 69'; Bouras 77'	Report	Benamar 27'	Stadium: Stade du 5 Juillet; Referee: Billel Bendjahene

10 February 2024 Round 16	US Biskra	2–1	JS Saoura	Biskra
16:00	Ounnas 89' (pen.); Dakhia 90+8'	Report	Khelif 45+2'	Stadium: 18 February Stadium; Referee: Lotfi Bekouassa

17 February 2024 Round 17	JS Saoura	1–1	MC Oran	Béchar
16:45	Akacem 83'	Report	Naâmani 90+4'	Stadium: 20 August 1955 Stadium; Referee: Youcef Gamouh

23 February 2024 Round 18	ES Ben Aknoun	2–0	JS Saoura	Belouizdad
16:00	Talah 29'; Aoudjane 85'	Report		Stadium: 20 August 1955 Stadium; Referee: Haithem Ghouti

2 March 2024 Round 19	JS Saoura	2–2	CS Constantine	Béchar
17:00	Souibaâh 32' (pen.); Saâdi 90+7'	Report	Dib 10'; Belhocini 67'	Stadium: 20 August 1955 Stadium; Referee: Hamza Bouslimani

16 March 2024 Round 20	MC El Bayadh	0–1	JS Saoura	El Bayadh
15:30		Report	Saâd 80'	Stadium: Zakaria Medjdoub Stadium; Referee: Houssam Benyahia

25 March 2024 Round 21	JS Saoura	0–1	MC Alger	Béchar
15:30		Report	Belaïli 29'	Stadium: 20 August 1955 Stadium; Referee: Nabil Boukhalfa

5 April 2024 Round 22	ASO Chlef	1–2	JS Saoura	Chlef
22:00	Zerdoum 90+5'	Report	Souibaâh 32'; Fettouhi 45+1'	Stadium: Mohamed Boumezrag Stadium; Referee: Lotfi Bekouassa

19 April 2024 Round 23	ES Sétif	2–1	JS Saoura	Sétif
16:00	Aggoun 45+2'; Aouissi 71'	Report	Hammia 45+2'	Stadium: 8 May 1945 Stadium; Referee: Mohamed Amine Chaoubi

26 April 2024 Round 24	JS Saoura	6–0	US Souf	Béchar
16:00	Saâdi 9', 43'; Amrane 24'; Souibaâh 51'; Haddadou 78'; Amieur 86'	Report		Stadium: 20 August 1955 Stadium; Referee: Mohamed Beloufa

11 May 2024 Round 25	NC Magra	1–0	JS Saoura	Magra
17:00	Dadache 82'	Report		Stadium: Boucheligue Brothers Stadium; Referee: Anes Azrine

17 May 2024 Round 26	JS Saoura	2–1	Paradou AC	Béchar
17:00	Souibaâh 40'; Khelif 90+1'	Report	Boulbina 48'	Stadium: 20 August 1955 Stadium; Referee: Yahia Dahar

26 May 2024 Round 27	USM Khenchela	1–0	JS Saoura	Khenchela
16:45	Omoyele 77'	Report		Stadium: Amar Hamam Stadium; Referee: Rafik Aouina

7 June 2024 Round 28	JS Saoura	2–1	USM Alger	Béchar
16:45	Bouchiba 39'; Souibaâh 89'	Report	Benamar 12' (o.g.)	Stadium: 20 August 1955 Stadium; Referee: Mohamed Saidi

11 June 2024 Round 29	JS Kabylie	1–1	JS Saoura	Tizi Ouzou
16:45	Akhrib 45+3'	Report	Fettouhi 78'	Stadium: 1 November 1954 Stadium; Referee: Youcef Taieb Bouderbal

14 June 2024 Round 30	JS Saoura	1–2	CR Belouizdad	Béchar
16:45	Souibaâh 42'	Report	Wamba 35'; Laouafi 84'	Stadium: 20 August 1955 Stadium; Referee: Mehadji Tayeb Bouderbal

=== Algerian Cup ===
3 February 2024 Round of 64	CRB Bougtob	0–2	JS Saoura	Bougtob
13:45		Report	Belhachemi 68'; Taib 87' (pen.)	Stadium: Bougtob Municipal Stadium; Referee: Zakaria Antar
Note: JS Saoura Lineups: Ouabdi, Akacem, Khelif, Benamar, Barkat, Baaziz, Khenoussi, Bouchiba, Saâd (substituted off) (Taib (substituted on) ), Hammia (substituted off) (Belhachemi (substituted on) ), Benyahia.

9 March 2024 Round of 32	WA Tlemcen	0–0 (a.e.t.) (7–6 p)	JS Saoura	Tlemcen
14:30		Report		Stadium: Colonel Lotfi Stadium; Referee: Fateh Harkat
Note: JS Saoura Lineups: Ouabdi, Akacem, Mebarki, Haddadou, Ouis, Baaziz (substituted off) 68' (Atallah (substituted on) 68'), Taib, Bouchiba, Saâd, Fettouhi (substituted off) 68' (Wunda (substituted on) 68'), Souibaâh.

== Squad information ==
=== Playing statistics ===
No.	Pos	Nat	Player	Total		Ligue 1		Algerian Cup	
No.	Pos	Nat	Player	Apps	Goals	Apps	Goals	Apps	Goals
Goalkeepers
1	GK	(Algeria) ALG	Abdennasser Djoudar	2	0	2	0	0	0
13	GK	(Algeria) ALG	Aymen Mouyet	3	0	3	0	0	0
16	GK	(Algeria) ALG	Walid Ouabdi	27	0	25	0	2	0
Defenders
2	DF	(Algeria) ALG	Riyane Akacem	28	1	26	1	2	0
3	DF	(Algeria) ALG	Marwane Khelif	26	2	25	2	1	0
4	DF	(Algeria) ALG	Fayçal Mebarki	10	0	9	0	1	0
5	DF	(Algeria) ALG	Benali Benamar	24	2	23	2	1	0
14	DF	(Algeria) ALG	Rabah Haddadou	5	1	4	1	1	0
17	DF	(Algeria) ALG	Mohamed Amrane	24	1	24	1	0	0
22	DF	(Algeria) ALG	Amine Benmiloud	11	0	11	0	0	0
56	DF	(Algeria) ALG	Abdnour Berkat	17	0	16	0	1	0
Midfielders
6	MF	(Algeria) ALG	Khathir Baaziz	28	0	26	0	2	0
7	MF	(Algeria) ALG	Abdeldjalil Saâd	24	3	22	3	2	0
8	MF	(Algeria) ALG	Ilyes Atallah	4	0	3	0	1	0
19	MF	(Algeria) ALG	Mosleh Khenoussi	12	0	11	0	1	0
24	MF	(Algeria) ALG	Tahir Boudouhiou	3	0	3	0	0	0
25	MF	(Algeria) ALG	Adel Bouchiba	30	1	28	1	2	0
26	MF	(Algeria) ALG	Mohamed El Amine Hammia	20	1	19	1	1	0
27	MF	(Algeria) ALG	Mohamed Taib	27	1	25	0	2	1
38	MF	(Algeria) ALG	Khaled Allaoui	1	0	1	0	0	0
Forwards
9	FW	(Algeria) ALG	Abdelhak Abdelhafid	14	1	14	1	0	0
10	FW	(Algeria) ALG	Nour El Islam Fettouhi	15	2	14	2	1	0
11	FW	(Algeria) ALG	Mohamed Souibaâh	13	6	12	6	1	0
12	FW	(Republic of the Congo) CGO	Carl Wunda	4	0	3	0	1	0
15	FW	(Algeria) ALG	Ismaïl Saâdi	19	3	19	3	0	0
21	FW	(Algeria) ALG	Mohamed Amine Ouis	19	0	18	0	1	0
23	FW	(Algeria) ALG	Cheikh Amieur	8	1	8	1	0	0
31	FW	(Algeria) ALG	Mohamed Belhachemi	3	0	3	0	0	0
53	FW	(Algeria) ALG	Mohamed Belhachemi	2	1	1	0	1	1
Players transferred out during the season
12	DF	(Algeria) ALG	Ilyes Mosbahi	2	0	2	0	0	0
8	MF	(Algeria) ALG	Ibrahim Farhi Benhalima	11	1	11	1	0	0
18	FW	(Algeria) ALG	Hicham Khalfallah	11	1	11	1	0	0
14	FW	(Nigeria) NGR	Michael Oghwiche	1	0	1	0	0	0
10	FW	(Algeria) ALG	Oussama Bellatreche	12	6	12	6	0	0
11	FW	(Algeria) ALG	Diaaeddine Benyahia	10	0	9	0	1	0

Last updated: 14 June 2024
Source: soccerway.com

=== Goalscorers ===
As of 14 June 2024

Includes all competitive matches.

No.	Nat.	Player	Pos.	L 1	AC	TOTAL
10	(Algeria)	Oussama Bellatreche	FW	6	0	6
11	(Algeria)	Mohamed Souibaâh	FW	6	0	6
15	(Algeria)	Ismaïl Saâdi	FW	4	0	4
7	(Algeria)	Abdeldjalil Saâd	MF	3	0	3
5	(Algeria)	Benali Benamar	DF	2	0	2
3	(Algeria)	Marwane Khelif	DF	2	0	2
10	(Algeria)	Nour El Islam Fettouhi	FW	2	0	2
8	(Algeria)	Ibrahim Farhi Benhalima	MF	1	0	1
9	(Algeria)	Abdelhak Abdelhafid	FW	1	0	1
53	(Algeria)	Mohamed Belhachemi	FW	0	1	1
27	(Algeria)	Mohamed Taib	MF	0	1	1
2	(Algeria)	Riyane Akacem	DF	1	0	1
26	(Algeria)	Mohamed El Amine Hammia	MF	1	0	1
17	(Algeria)	Mohamed Amrane	DF	1	0	1
14	(Algeria)	Rabah Haddadou	DF	1	0	1
23	(Algeria)	Cheikh Amieur	FW	1	0	1
18	(Algeria)	Hicham Khalfallah	FW	1	0	1
25	(Algeria)	Adel Bouchiba	MF	1	0	1
Own Goals				0	0	0
Totals				34	2	36
