= 2026–27 JS Saoura season =

JS Saoura
2026–27 season
- Owner: ENAFOR
- Head coach: Lotfi Boudraa (from 19 July 2026) (until 19 September 2026); Majdi Kardi (from 4 October 2026)
- Stadium: 20 August 1955 Stadium
- Ligue 1: 15th
- Algerian Cup: Round of 64
- Champions League: First round

The 2026–27 season, is JS Saoura's 15th consecutive season in the top flight of Algerian football. In addition to the domestic league, JS Saoura are participating in this season's editions of the Algerian Cup and the Champions League.

== Squad list ==
Players and squad numbers last updated on 31 August 2026.
Note: Flags indicate national team as has been defined under FIFA eligibility rules. Players may hold more than one non-FIFA nationality.

No.	Nat.	Name	Position	Date of Birth (Age)	Signed from
Goalkeepers
1	(Algeria)	Abdelkader Salhi	GK	19 March 1993 (aged 33)	(Algeria) MC El Bayadh
16	(Algeria)	Abdesslam Hannane	GK	23 September 1995 (aged 30)	(Algeria) ES Mostaganem
30	(Algeria)	Mohamed Merhab	GK	1 February 2005 (aged 21)	(Algeria) Reserve team
Defenders
2	(Algeria)	Oussama Yerou	CB	9 April 2001 (aged 25)	(Algeria) MC El Bayadh
3	(Algeria)	Mohamed Nabi	LB	9 May 2000 (aged 26)	(Algeria) US Chaouia
4	(Algeria)	Fayçal Mebarki	CB	31 August 2000 (aged 25)	(Algeria) Reserve team
5	(Ivory Coast)	Anthony Tra Bi Tra	CB	27 December 1998 (aged 27)	(Tanzania) Singida Black Stars
6	(Algeria)	Ilyes Haddouche	CB	1 July 1998 (aged 28)	(Algeria) ES Ben Aknoun
24	(Algeria)	Abdenour Barkat	RB	26 July 2003 (aged 23)	(Algeria) Reserve team
25	(Algeria)	Amine Benmiloud	CB	7 January 2001 (aged 25)	(Algeria) US Béchar Djedid
28	(Algeria)	Abdelhak Cherir	LB	11 July 2005 (aged 21)	(Algeria) JS Kabylie
	(Algeria)	Ayoub Karim	RB	11 January 2007 (aged 19)	(Algeria) Reserve team
Midfielders
8	(Algeria)	Abdelhak Khoumani	AM	11 March 2004 (aged 22)	(Algeria) Reserve team
11	(Algeria)	Mohamed Fenniri	AM	20 January 1998 (aged 28)	(Algeria) US Chaouia
14	(Algeria)	Khalid Dahamni	AM	25 November 1999 (aged 26)	(Algeria) MC El Bayadh
17	(Algeria)	Mohamed Goumaidi	AM	15 April 2005 (aged 21)	(Algeria) RA Aïn Defla
18	(Algeria)	Ilyes Atallah	DM	19 August 2001 (aged 25)	(Algeria) MC El Bayadh
19	(Ivory Coast)	Constant Wayou	AM	20 December 1996 (aged 29)	(Ivory Coast) FC San Pédro
20	(Algeria)	Mostapha Badaoui	DM	17 October 2006 (aged 19)	(Algeria) Reserve team
23	(Algeria)	Khaled Allaoui	DM	24 July 2004 (aged 22)	(Algeria) Reserve team
27	(Algeria)	Oussama Daibeche	DM	28 January 1999 (aged 27)	(Algeria) ES Sétif
Forwards
7	(Algeria)	Dhiyaeddine Benyahia	RW	13 July 2000 (aged 26)	(Algeria) MC El Bayadh
9	(Algeria)	Mohamed Belghanami	ST	10 August 2006 (aged 20)	(Algeria) Reserve team
10	(Algeria)	Nour El Islam Fettouhi	RW	28 August 1999 (aged 26)	(Algeria) USM Alger
13	(Algeria)	Mohamed Bouklila	ST	15 November 1996 (aged 29)	(Algeria) NRB Teleghma
15	(Algeria)	Oussama Bouguerri	ST	15 January 2006 (aged 20)	(Algeria) ES Sétif
21	(Algeria)	Oussama Bentaleb	RW	12 October 2001 (aged 24)	(Algeria) JS Guir
22	(Algeria)	Merouane Boussalem	RW	11 February 1996 (aged 30)	(Algeria) ASM Oran
29	(Ivory Coast)	Ashiraf Ojo	LW	2 December 2004 (aged 21)	(Ivory Coast) Stella Club d'Adjamé

== Transfers ==
=== In ===
==== Summer ====
Date	Pos	Player	Moving from	Fee	Source
18 July 2026	GK	(Algeria) Abdesslam Hannane	ES Mostaganem	Free transfer	
18 July 2026	AM	(Algeria) Mohamed Fenniri	US Chaouia	Free transfer	
18 July 2026	AM	(Algeria) Khalid Dahamni	MC El Bayadh	Free transfer	
18 July 2026	LB	(Algeria) Mohamed Nabi	US Chaouia	Free transfer	
28 July 2026	ST	(Algeria) Oussama Bouguerri	ES Sétif	Free transfer	
1 August 2026	DM	(Algeria) Oussama Daibeche	ES Sétif	Free transfer	
1 August 2026	CB	(Ivory Coast) Anthony Tra Bi Tra	(Tanzania) Singida Black Stars	Free transfer	
5 August 2026	RB	(Algeria) Ayoub Karim	Youth team	First Professional Contract	
5 August 2026	ST	(Algeria) Mohamed Belghanami	Youth team	First Professional Contract	
5 August 2026	DM	(Algeria) Mostapha Badaoui	Youth team	First Professional Contract	
10 August 2026	RW	(Algeria) Merouane Boussalem	ASM Oran	Free transfer	
10 August 2026	ST	(Algeria) Mohamed Bouklila	NRB Teleghma	Free transfer	
10 August 2026	CB	(Algeria) Amine Benmiloud	US Béchar Djedid	Free transfer	
15 August 2026	LB	(Algeria) Abdelhak Cherir	JS Kabylie	Free transfer	
16 August 2026	CB	(Algeria) Oussama Yerou	MC El Bayadh	Free transfer	
16 August 2026	DM	(Algeria) Ilyes Atallah	MC El Bayadh	Free transfer	
16 August 2026	RW	(Algeria) Dhiyaeddine Benyahia	MC El Bayadh	Free transfer	

=== Out ===
==== Summer ====
Date	Pos	Player	Moving to	Fee	Source
7 June 2026	LB	(Algeria) Hamza Mouali	JS Kabylie	Loan return	
9 June 2026	DM	(Algeria) Abdelkader Boutiche	Olympique Akbou	Free transfer	
16 June 2026	CB	(Algeria) Nasreddine Zaalani	Olympique Akbou	Free transfer	
27 June 2026	CB	(Algeria) Riyane Akacem	CR Belouizdad	Undisclosed	
30 June 2026	LW	(Algeria) Ismail Saadi	MC Oran	Free transfer	
30 June 2026	ST	(Nigeria) Sikiru Alimi	Unattached	End of contract	
30 June 2026	ST	(Ivory Coast) Stéphane Bédi	Unattached	End of contract	
13 July 2026	CB	(Algeria) Issameddine Tahouri	Unattached	Free transfer (Released)	
19 July 2026	DM	(Algeria) Sid Ahmed Matallah	USM Khenchela	Free transfer	
30 July 2026	ST	(Algeria) Laid Ayad	US Chaouia	Free transfer	
5 August 2026	DM	(Algeria) Housseyn Selmi	ES Ben Aknoun	Free transfer	
9 August 2026	DM	(Algeria) Adel Bouchiba	JSM Skikda	Free transfer	

== Competitions ==
=== Overview ===
Competition	Record								Started round	Final position / round	First match	Last match
Competition	G	W	D	L	GF	GA	GD	Win %	Started round	Final position / round	First match	Last match
Ligue 1	10	1	4	5	3	11	−8	10.00	—N/a	To be confirmed	22 September 2026	In Progress
Algerian Cup	0	0	0	0	0	0	+0	—	Round of 64	To be confirmed	December 2026	In Progress
Champions League	2	1	0	1	2	3	−1	50.00	First round	First round	4 September 2026	13 September 2026
Total	12	2	4	6	5	14	−9	16.67				

Updated to match played 20 November 2026
Source: Competitions

=== Ligue 1 ===
==== League table ====
Pos	Team	Pld	W	D	L	GF	GA	GD	Pts	Qualification or relegation
12	ES Ben Aknoun	9	1	5	3	8	10	−2	8	
13	ASO Chlef	10	1	5	4	9	13	−4	8	
14	USM Khenchela	10	1	4	5	5	12	−7	7	Relegation to Algerian League 2
15	JS Saoura	10	1	4	5	3	11	−8	7	Relegation to Algerian League 2
16	US Biskra	10	0	5	5	5	15	−10	5	Relegation to Algerian League 2

Updated to match(es) played on 20 November 2026. Source: lfp.dz
Rules for classification: 1) Points; 2) Head-to-head points; 3) Head-to-head goal difference; 4) First half goal difference; 5) First half total goals; 6) Fairplay ranking; 7) Playoff.

==== Results summary ====
Overall								Home						Away					
Pld	W	D	L	GF	GA	GD	Pts	W	D	L	GF	GA	GD	W	D	L	GF	GA	GD
10	1	4	5	2	11	−9	7	1	3	0	2	1	+1	0	1	5	0	10	−10

Last updated: 20 November 2026.
Source: Competitive matches

==== Results by round ====
Round	1	2	3	4	5	6	7	8	9	10	11	12	13	14	15	16	17	18	19	20	21	22	23	24	25	26	27	28	29	30
Ground	A	H	A	H	A	A	H	A	H	A	H	A	H	A	H	H	A	H	A	H	H	A	H	A	H	A	H	A	H	A
Result	D	D	L	D	L	L	D	L	W	L																				
Position	9																													

Updated to match(es) played on 20 November 2026. Source: Competitive matches
A = Away; H = Home; W = Win; D = Draw; L = Loss

==== Matches ====
The league fixtures were announced on 3 August 2026.

All times are local, WAT (UTC+1).

Win Draw Loss Postponed

18 September 2026 Round 3	JS El Biar	4–0	JS Saoura	Dar El Beïda
16:00	Merzougui 49'; Mouaki 78'; Kanté 88'; Cissoko 90+4'	Flashscore; LFP		Stadium: Omar Benrabah Stadium; Referee: Nabil Boukhalfa

22 September 2026 Round 1	US Biskra	0–0	JS Saoura	Zeribet El Oued
17:00		Flashscore; LFP		Stadium: Bouhafs Chabi Stadium; Referee: Haitham Ghouti

8 October 2026 Round 4	JS Saoura	0–0	Olympique Akbou	Béchar
18:00		Flashscore; LFP		Stadium: 20 August 1955 Stadium; Referee: Youcef Taieb Bouderbal

13 October 2026 Round 5	USM Alger	1–0	JS Saoura	Algiers
20:15	Bouderbala 31'	Flashscore; LFP		Stadium: Stade du 5 Juillet; Referee: Akram Mechaïria

18 October 2026 Round 6	MB Rouissat	1–0	JS Saoura	Ouargla
17:45	Midoune 6'	Flashscore; LFP		Stadium: 18 February Stadium; Referee: Mehdi Oukil

24 October 2026 Round 7	JS Saoura	0–0	ES Ben Aknoun	Béchar
18:00		Flashscore; LFP		Stadium: 20 August 1955 Stadium; Referee: Yahia Dahar

2 November 2026 Round 8	CR Belouizdad	1–0	JS Saoura	Algiers
20:00	Ben Hammouda 50' (pen.)	Flashscore; LFP		Stadium: Stade du 5 Juillet; Referee: Ayoub Belhachemi

8 November 2026 Round 9	JS Saoura	1–0	CS Constantine	Béchar
17:45	Belghanami 61'	Flashscore; LFP		Stadium: 20 August 1955 Stadium; Referee: Sid Ahmed Lellouchi

13 November 2026 Round 2	JS Saoura	1–1	USM Khenchela	Béchar
18:00	Allaoui 9'	Flashscore; LFP	Mebarki 45+2' (o.g.)	Stadium: 20 August 1955 Stadium; Referee: Mustapha Smaïl

20 November 2026 Round 10	MC Oran	3–1	JS Saoura	Bir El Djir
20:00	Traoré 5'; Benkhedim 45+5'; Kerroum 90+6'	Flashscore; LFP	Fettouhi 58'	Stadium: Miloud Hadefi Stadium; Referee: Haitham Ghouti

1 December 2026 Round 11	JS Saoura	–	JS Kabylie	Béchar
17:00		Flashscore; LFP		Stadium: 20 August 1955 Stadium

Round 12	MC Alger	–	JS Saoura	Douéra
:		Flashscore; LFP		Stadium: Ali La Pointe Stadium

Round 13	JS Saoura	–	CR Témouchent	Béchar
:		Flashscore; LFP		Stadium: 20 August 1955 Stadium

Round 14	ASO Chlef	–	JS Saoura	Chlef
:		Flashscore; LFP		Stadium: Mohamed Boumezrag Stadium

Round 15	JS Saoura	–	ES Sétif	Béchar
:		Flashscore; LFP		Stadium: 20 August 1955 Stadium

Round 16	JS Saoura	–	US Biskra	Béchar
:		Flashscore; LFP		Stadium: 20 August 1955 Stadium

Round 17	USM Khenchela	–	JS Saoura	Khenchela
:		Flashscore; LFP		Stadium: Amar Hamam Stadium

Round 18	JS Saoura	–	JS El Biar	Béchar
:		Flashscore; LFP		Stadium: 20 August 1955 Stadium

Round 19	Olympique Akbou	–	JS Saoura	Akbou
:		Flashscore; LFP		Stadium: Martyrs Stadium

Round 20	JS Saoura	–	USM Alger	Béchar
:		Flashscore; LFP		Stadium: 20 August 1955 Stadium

Round 21	JS Saoura	–	MB Rouissat	Béchar
:		Flashscore; LFP		Stadium: 20 August 1955 Stadium

Round 22	ES Ben Aknoun	–	JS Saoura	Belouizdad
:		Flashscore; LFP		Stadium: 20 August 1955 Stadium

Round 23	JS Saoura	–	CR Belouizdad	Béchar
:		Flashscore; LFP		Stadium: 20 August 1955 Stadium

Round 24	CS Constantine	–	JS Saoura	Constantine
:		Flashscore; LFP		Stadium: Chahid Hamlaoui Stadium

Round 25	JS Saoura	–	MC Oran	Béchar
:		Flashscore; LFP		Stadium: 20 August 1955 Stadium

Round 26	JS Kabylie	–	JS Saoura	Tizi Ouzou
:		Flashscore; LFP		Stadium: Hocine Aït Ahmed Stadium

Round 27	JS Saoura	–	MC Alger	Béchar
:		Flashscore; LFP		Stadium: 20 August 1955 Stadium

Round 28	CR Témouchent	–	JS Saoura	Aïn Témouchent
:		Flashscore; LFP		Stadium: Omar Oucief Stadium

Round 29	JS Saoura	–	ASO Chlef	Béchar
:		Flashscore; LFP		Stadium: 20 August 1955 Stadium

Round 30	ES Sétif	–	JS Saoura	Sétif
:		Flashscore; LFP		Stadium: 8 May 1945 Stadium

=== Algerian Cup ===
December 2026 Round of 64	–
:

=== Champions League ===
==== Qualifying rounds ====
In the qualifying rounds, each tie will be played on a home-and-away two-legged basis. If the aggregate score will be tied after the second leg, the away goals rule will be applied, and if still tied, extra time will not be played, and a penalty shoot-out will be used to determine the winner (Regulations III. 13 & 14).

===== First round =====
4 September 2026 First leg	(Algeria) JS Saoura	1–0	Horoya (Guinea)	Oran
19:00 UTC+1	Bentaleb 44'	Report		Stadium: Miloud Hadefi Stadium; Referee: Nasir Salum Siyah (Tanzania)

13 September 2026 Second leg	(Guinea) Horoya	3–1 (3–2 agg.)	JS Saoura (Algeria)	Conakry
16:00 UTC+0	Barry 17' (pen.); Sylla 90'; Coulibaly 90+2'	Report	Haddouche 57'	Stadium: 28 September Stadium; Referee: Louis Mwamba Masangune (DR Congo)

== Squad information ==
=== Appearances and goals ===
As of 20 November 2026

No.	Pos	Player	Nat	Ligue 1			Algerian Cup			Champions League			Total		
No.	Pos	Player	Nat	App	St	G	App	St	G	App	St	G	App	St	G
Goalkeepers
1	GK	Abdelkader Salhi	(Algeria)	9	9	0	0	0	0	2	2	0	0	0	0
16	GK	Abdesslam Hannane	(Algeria)	1	1	0	0	0	0	0	0	0	0	0	0
30	GK	Mohamed Merhab	(Algeria)	0	0	0	0	0	0	0	0	0	0	0	0
Defenders
2	CB	Oussama Yerou	(Algeria)	7	1	0	0	0	0	1	1	0	0	0	0
3	LB	Mohamed Nabi	(Algeria)	4	4	0	0	0	0	1	1	0	0	0	0
4	CB	Fayçal Mebarki	(Algeria)	10	10	0	0	0	0	2	2	0	0	0	0
5	CB	Anthony Tra Bi Tra	(Ivory Coast)	9	9	0	0	0	0	1	0	0	0	0	0
6	CB	Ilyes Haddouche	(Algeria)	3	1	0	0	0	0	2	2	0	0	0	0
24	RB	Abdenour Barkat	(Algeria)	9	9	0	0	0	0	2	2	0	0	0	0
25	CB	Amine Benmiloud	(Algeria)	4	4	0	0	0	0	1	1	0	0	0	0
28	LB	Abdelhak Cherir	(Algeria)	0	0	0	0	0	0	0	0	0	0	0	0
	RB	Ayoub Karim	(Algeria)	0	0	0	0	0	0	0	0	0	0	0	0
Midfielders
8	AM	Abdelhak Khoumani	(Algeria)	1	0	0	0	0	0	0	0	0	0	0	0
11	AM	Mohamed Fenniri	(Algeria)	6	2	0	0	0	0	0	0	0	0	0	0
14	AM	Khalid Dahamni	(Algeria)	7	3	0	0	0	0	1	1	0	0	0	0
17	AM	Mohamed Goumaidi	(Algeria)	0	0	0	0	0	0	0	0	0	0	0	0
18	DM	Ilyes Atallah	(Algeria)	6	3	0	0	0	0	2	0	0	0	0	0
19	AM	Constant Wayou	(Ivory Coast)	10	4	0	0	0	0	2	2	0	0	0	0
20	DM	Mostapha Badaoui	(Algeria)	0	0	0	0	0	0	0	0	0	0	0	0
23	DM	Khaled Allaoui	(Algeria)	10	8	1	0	0	0	0	0	0	0	0	0
27	DM	Oussama Daibeche	(Algeria)	10	10	0	0	0	0	2	2	0	0	0	0
Forwards
7	RW	Dhiyaeddine Benyahia	(Algeria)	4	0	0	0	0	0	1	0	0	0	0	0
9	ST	Mohamed Belghanami	(Algeria)	10	6	1	0	0	0	1	0	0	0	0	0
10	RW	Nour El Islam Fettouhi	(Algeria)	10	7	1	0	0	0	2	2	0	0	0	0
13	ST	Mohamed Bouklila	(Algeria)	1	0	0	0	0	0	0	0	0	0	0	0
15	ST	Oussama Bouguerri	(Algeria)	5	0	0	0	0	0	2	0	0	0	0	0
21	RW	Oussama Bentaleb	(Algeria)	10	7	0	0	0	0	2	2	1	0	0	0
22	RW	Merouane Boussalem	(Algeria)	2	0	0	0	0	0	1	0	0	0	0	0
29	ST	Ashiraf Ojo	(Ivory Coast)	9	9	0	0	0	0	2	2	0	0	0	0
Total				10		3	0		0	2		2	0		0

Last updated: 20 November 2026
Source: soccerway.com

=== Goalscorers ===
As of 20 November 2026

Includes all competitive matches.

No.	Nat.	Player	Pos.	L1	AC	CL	TOTAL
21	(Algeria)	Oussama Bentaleb	RW	0	0	1	1
6	(Algeria)	Ilyes Haddouche	CB	0	0	1	1
9	(Algeria)	Mohamed Belghanami	ST	1	0	0	1
23	(Algeria)	Khaled Allaoui	DM	1	0	0	1
10	(Algeria)	Nour El Islam Fettouhi	RW	1	0	0	1
Own Goals				0	0	0	0
Totals				3	0	2	5

=== Clean sheets ===
As of 20 November 2026

Includes all competitive matches.

					Clean sheets			
No.	Nat	Name	GP	GA	L1	AC	CL	Total
1	(Algeria)	Abdelkader Salhi	11	10	4	0	1	5
16	(Algeria)	Abdesslam Hannane	1	4	0	0	0	0
30	(Algeria)	Mohamed Merhab	0	0	0	0	0	0
		TOTALS		14	4	0	1	5
