= 2020–21 JS Saoura season =

JS Saoura
2020–21 season
- Owner: Entreprise Nationale de Forage
- President: Mohamed Zerouati
- Head coach: Meziane Ighil (until 15 February 2021} Moustapha Djallit (from 17 February 2021}
- Stadium: Stade 20 Août 1955
- Ligue 1: 3rd
- League Cup: Quarter-finals
- Top goalscorer: League: Billel Messaoudi (18 goals); All: Billel Messaoudi (20 goals)
- Highest home attendance: 0 (Note: no one can attend games due to the COVID-19 pandemic)
- Lowest home attendance: 0 (Note: no one can attend games due to the COVID-19 pandemic)
- Average home league attendance: 0 (Note: no one can attend games due to the COVID-19 pandemic)

In the 2020–21 season, JS Saoura is competing in the Ligue 1 for the 9th season, and the League Cup. It is their 9th consecutive season in the top flight of Algerian football.

== Squad list ==
Players and squad numbers last updated on 15 November 2020.
Note: Flags indicate national team as has been defined under FIFA eligibility rules. Players may hold more than one non-FIFA nationality.

No.	Nat.	Position	Name	Date of birth (age)	Signed from
Goalkeepers
1	(Algeria)	GK	Zakaria Saidi	5 August 1996 (aged 24)	(Algeria) Olympique de Médéa
13	(Algeria)	GK	Aymen Mouyet	17 May 1999 (aged 21)	(Algeria) ES Sétif
16	(Algeria)	GK	Zakaria Haouli	28 April 1997 (aged 23)	(Algeria) Youth system
Defenders
2	(Algeria)	CB	Riyane Akacem	13 February 1999 (aged 21)	(Algeria) Youth system
3	(Algeria)		Abdelkadir Bensalah	4 September 1993 (aged 27)	(Algeria) Unattached
4	(Algeria)		Abdelkrim Allaoui	15 September 1999 (aged 21)	(Algeria) Youth system
12	(Algeria)		Oussama Kaddour	12 May 1997 (aged 23)	(Algeria) CR Témouchent
14	(Algeria)	RB	Oussama Meddahi	14 February 1991 (aged 29)	(Algeria) DRB Tadjenanet
15	(Algeria)	CB	Fateh Talah	30 March 1993 (aged 27)	(Algeria) CA Batna
17	(Algeria)	CB	Mohamed Amrane	27 January 1994 (aged 26)	(Algeria) CA Bordj Bou Arreridj
22	(Algeria)	CB	Imadeddine Boubekeur	10 July 1995 (aged 25)	(Algeria) Olympique de Médéa
53	(Algeria)	LB	Marwane Khelif	8 February 2000 (aged 20)	(Algeria) Youth system
Midfielders
6	(Algeria)	AM	Abderrazak Khelifi	1 April 1999 (aged 21)	(Algeria) Youth system
7	(Algeria)	AM	Abdeldjalil Taki Eddine Saâd	12 March 1992 (aged 28)	(Algeria) MC Saida
18	(Algeria)		Mohamed Daoud	27 December 1991 (aged 29)	(Algeria) Olympique de Médéa
20	(Algeria)		Walid Belhamri	19 November 1990 (aged 30)	(Algeria) WA Tlemcen
21	(Algeria)	AM	Belaid Hamidi	7 May 1996 (aged 24)	(Algeria) MC Saida
25	(Algeria)	DM	Adel Bouchiba	10 November 1988 (aged 32)	(Algeria) Olympique de Médéa
26	(Algeria)	AM	Mohamed El Amine Hammia	21 December 1991 (aged 29)	(Algeria) USM Blida
Forwards
5	(Algeria)		Farouk Slimani	1 July 1999 (aged 21)	(Algeria) Youth system
8	(Algeria)	RW	Sid Ali Yahia-Chérif	4 January 1985 (aged 35)	(Algeria) CR Belouizdad
9	(Algeria)	ST	Billel Messaoudi	21 December 1997 (aged 23)	(Algeria) WA Tlemcen
10	(Algeria)	LW	Abdelmehdi Droueche	20 May 1995 (aged 25)	(Algeria) CA Bordj Bou Arreridj
11	(Algeria)	LW	Aimen Lahmeri	28 May 1996 (aged 24)	(Algeria) GC Mascara
19	(Algeria)	LW	Hamza Zaidi	9 November 1990 (aged 30)	(Algeria) MSP Batna
24	(Algeria)		Mohamed Lamine Boutouala	27 November 1999 (aged 21)	(Algeria) Youth system

== Pre-season ==
4 November 2020 Friendly	USM Alger	0–0 (Note: The match was played each half for 35 minutes.)	JS Saoura	Zéralda
15:00				Stadium: Zéralda Stadium

== Competitions ==
=== Overview ===
Competition	Record								Started round	Final position / round	First match	Last match
Competition	G	W	D	L	GF	GA	GD	Win %	Started round	Final position / round	First match	Last match
Ligue 1	38	20	9	9	60	30	+30	52.63	—N/a	3rd	28 November 2020	24 August 2021
League Cup	2	1	0	1	5	2	+3	50.00	Round of 16	Quarter-finals	8 May 2021	4 June 2021
Total	40	21	9	10	65	32	+33	52.50				

Updated to match played 24 August 2021
Source: Competitions

== League table ==
Pos	Team	Pld	W	D	L	GF	GA	GD	Pts	Qualification or relegation
1	CR Belouizdad (C)	38	22	13	3	69	27	+42	79	Qualification for Champions League
2	ES Sétif	38	21	9	8	69	32	+37	71 (Note: On May 16, 2021 after not respecting Covid-19 tests regulation before RC Relizane match, ES Sétif Lost the match 2–0.)	Qualification for Champions League
3	JS Saoura	38	20	9	9	60	30	+30	69 (Note: On March 13, 2021 after the participation of a penalized player Oussama Meddahi against Paradou AC, JS Saoura Lost the match 3–0.)	Qualification for Confederation Cup
4	USM Alger	38	19	8	11	62	39	+23	65	
5	JS Kabylie	38	17	10	11	44	33	+11	61	Qualification for Confederation Cup

Updated to match(es) played on 28 August 2021. Source: dzfoot.com
Rules for classification: 1) points; 2) head-to-head points; 3) head-to-head goal difference; 4) goal difference; 5) total goals; 6) fairplay ranking; 7) playoff.
(C) Champions

=== Results summary ===
Overall								Home						Away					
Pld	W	D	L	GF	GA	GD	Pts	W	D	L	GF	GA	GD	W	D	L	GF	GA	GD
38	21	9	8	62	30	+32	72	15	4	0	40	10	+30	6	5	8	22	20	+2

Last updated: 24 August 2021.
Source: Competitive matches

=== Results by round ===
Round	1	2	3	4	5	6	7	8	9	10	11	12	13	14	15	16	17	18	19	20	21	22	23	24	25	26	27	28	29	30	31	32	33	34	35	36	37	38
Ground																																						
Result	W	D	D	W	W	W	L	W	L	W	L	W	W	W	W	L	W	W	D	W	L	W	D	W	L	W	D	W	L	D	W	D	D	W	D	L	W	W
Position	4	4	4	5	4	2	4	3	4	3	4	4	3	2	2	2	2	2	2	2	3	3	3	3	3	3	3	3	3	3	3	3	3	3	3	3	3	3

Updated to match(es) played on 24 August 2021. Source: Competitive matches
A = Away; H = Home; W = Win; D = Draw; L = Loss

=== Matches ===
On 22 October 2020, the Algerian Ligue Professionnelle 1 fixtures were announced.

28 November 2020 Round 1	Olympique de Médéa	0–1	JS Saoura	Médéa
14:30		Soccerway report	Lahmeri 75'	Stadium: Stade Imam Lyes; Attendance: 0 (close doors); Referee: Malek Ait Ameur

5 December 2020 Round 2	JS Saoura	2–2	USM Alger	Béchar
14:00	Hamidi 21'; Messaoudi 55' (pen.)	Soccerway report	Zouari 51'; Radouani 57'	Stadium: Stade 20 Août 1955; Attendance: 0 (close doors); Referee: Mohamed Saïdi

11 December 2020 Round 3	RC Relizane	0–0	JS Saoura	Relizane
14:00		Soccerway report		Stadium: Stade Tahar Zoughari; Attendance: 0 (close doors); Referee: Houssam Benyahia

19 December 2020 Round 4	JS Saoura	2–0	USM Bel Abbès	Béchar
14:30	Messaoudi 50', 87'	Soccerway report		Stadium: Stade 20 Août 1955; Attendance: 0 (close doors); Referee: Hamza Bouslimani

23 December 2020 Round 5	NC Magra	0–2	JS Saoura	Magra
14:30		Soccerway report	Hamidi 16' (pen.); Messaoudi 63'	Stadium: Boucheligue Brothers Stadium; Attendance: 0 (close doors); Referee: Lyés Bekouassa

8 January 2021 Round 7	JSM Skikda	1–0	JS Saoura	Skikda
14:30	Ziouache 68'	Soccerway report		Stadium: Stade 20 Août 1955; Attendance: 0 (close doors); Referee: Said Aouina

15 January 2021 Round 8	JS Saoura	2–1	NA Hussein Dey	Béchar
14:30	Hamidi 64' (pen.), 80' (pen.)	Soccerway report	Meftah 58' (pen.)	Stadium: Stade 20 Août 1955; Attendance: 0 (close doors); Referee: Malek Ait Ameur

22 January 2021 Round 9	JS Kabylie	2–1	JS Saoura	Tizi Ouzou
14:30	Hamroune 40' (pen.); Bounoua 86'	Soccerway report	Droueche 90+1' (pen.)	Stadium: Stade 1er Novembre 1954; Attendance: 0 (close doors); Referee: Youcef Gamouh

26 January 2021 Round 10	JS Saoura	1–0	CS Constantine	Béchar
15:00	Saâd 86'	Soccerway report		Stadium: Stade 20 Août 1955; Attendance: 0 (close doors); Referee: Farouk Mial

30 January 2021 Round 11	MC Oran	2–1	JS Saoura	Oran
15:00	Hamidi 31'; Mellel 64'	Soccerway report	Meddahi 71'	Stadium: Ahmed Zabana Stadium; Attendance: 0 (close doors); Referee: Yazid Ibrir

3 February 2021 Round 6	JS Saoura	1–0	MC Alger	Béchar
14:30	Messaoudi 3'	Soccerway report		Stadium: Stade 20 Août 1955; Attendance: 0 (close doors); Referee: Ahmed Bouzrar

7 February 2021 Round 12	JS Saoura	2–0	CA Bordj Bou Arreridj	Béchar
15:00	Yahia-Chérif 39', 74'	Soccerway report		Stadium: Stade 20 Août 1955; Attendance: 0 (close doors); Referee: Bilal Bendjahene

20 February 2021 Round 14	ASO Chlef	0–6	JS Saoura	Chlef
15:00		Soccerway report	Lahmeri 14'; Kaidi 37'; Zaidi 45', 57'; Messaoudi 60'; Yahia-Chérif 77'	Stadium: Stade Mohamed Boumezrag; Attendance: 0 (close doors); Referee: Mohamed Boutaraa

26 February 2021 Round 15	JS Saoura	4–0	US Biskra	Béchar
15:00	Daoud 25'; Messaoudi 45', 53'; Lahmeri 73' (pen.)	Soccerway report		Stadium: Stade 20 Août 1955; Attendance: 0 (close doors); Referee: Mustapha Bessiri

12 March 2021 Round 17	JS Saoura	1–0	WA Tlemcen	Béchar
15:00	Hamidi 33' (pen.)	Soccerway report		Stadium: Stade 20 Août 1955; Attendance: 0 (close doors); Referee: Farouk Mial

17 March 2021 Round 18	Paradou AC	3–0	JS Saoura	Dar El Beïda
15:00	Bouabta 80'	Soccerway report	Messaoudi 75' (pen.); Daoud 82'	Stadium: Omar Benrabah Stadium; Attendance: 0 (close doors); Referee: Mustapha Ghorbal
Note: On March 13, 2021 after the participation of a penalized player Oussama Meddahi against Paradou AC, JS Saoura Lost the match 3–0 and were deducted 3 points.

21 March 2021 Round 19	AS Ain M'lila	1–1	JS Saoura	Aïn M'lila
15:00	Hamia 60' (pen.)	Soccerway report	Zaidi 44'	Stadium: Touhami Zoubir Khelifi Stadium; Attendance: 0 (close doors); Referee: Lyés Bekouassa

26 March 2021 Round 13	JS Saoura	1–0	ES Sétif	Béchar
15:00	Messaoudi 54'	Soccerway report		Stadium: Stade 20 Août 1955; Attendance: 0 (close doors); Referee: Ahmed Bouzrar

25 April 2021 Round 16	CR Belouizdad	2–1	JS Saoura	Algiers
22:30	Sayoud 38'; Keddad 64'	Soccerway report	Messaoudi 56' (pen.)	Stadium: Stade du 5 Juillet; Attendance: 0 (close doors); Referee: Mehdi Abid Charef

4 May 2021 Round 20	JS Saoura	2–0	Olympique de Médéa	Béchar
22:30	Messaoudi 27', 29'	Soccerway report		Stadium: Stade 20 Août 1955; Attendance: 0 (close doors); Referee: Amine Sekhraoui

16 May 2021 Round 21	USM Alger	2–0	JS Saoura	Bologhine
17:00	Belkacemi 45' (pen.), 73'	Soccerway report		Stadium: Omar Hamadi Stadium; Attendance: 0 (close doors); Referee: Abderrezzak Arab

22 May 2021 Round 22	JS Saoura	5–1	RC Relizane	Béchar
18:00	Saâd 35'; Messaoudi 76', 87', 89', 90+2'	Soccerway report	Aoued 45+2'	Stadium: Stade 20 Août 1955; Attendance: 0 (close doors); Referee: Bilal Bendjahene

26 May 2021 Round 23	USM Bel Abbès	1–1	JS Saoura	Sidi Bel Abbès
17:45	Hamza 76'	Soccerway report	Saâd 69'	Stadium: Stade 24 Fevrier 1956; Attendance: 0 (close doors); Referee: Houssam Benyahia

30 May 2021 Round 24	JS Saoura	1–0	NC Magra	Béchar
18:00	Hamidi 88'	Soccerway report		Stadium: Stade 20 Août 1955; Attendance: 0 (close doors); Referee: Ali Nader

13 June 2021 Round 25	MC Alger	1–0	JS Saoura	Algiers
17:45	Hachoud 18'	Soccerway report		Stadium: Stade du 5 Juillet; Attendance: 0 (close doors); Referee: Mehdi Abid Charef

19 June 2021 Round 26	JS Saoura	3–0	JSM Skikda	Béchar
20:00	Messaoudi 15'; Boubekeur 40'; Hamidi 52'	Soccerway report		Stadium: Stade 20 Août 1955; Attendance: 0 (close doors); Referee: Walid Lahrache

27 June 2021 Round 27	NA Hussein Dey	1–1	JS Saoura	Belouizdad
17:00	Nadji 40'	Soccerway report	Lahmeri 45'	Stadium: Stade 20 Août 1955; Attendance: 0 (close doors); Referee: Said Aouina

1 July 2021 Round 28	JS Saoura	2–0	JS Kabylie	Béchar
18:00	Hammia 47' (pen.); Lahmeri 69'	Soccerway report		Stadium: Stade 20 Août 1955; Attendance: 0 (close doors); Referee: Bilal Bendjahene

4 July 2021 Round 29	CS Constantine	1–0	JS Saoura	Constantine
17:00	Haddad 85'	Soccerway report		Stadium: Stade Ramdane Benabdelmalek; Attendance: 0 (close doors); Referee: Lotfi Bekouassa

8 July 2021 Round 30	JS Saoura	1–1	MC Oran	Béchar
18:00	Hamidi 45+3'	Soccerway report	Khettab 57'	Stadium: Stade 20 Août 1955; Attendance: 0 (close doors); Referee: Amine Sekhraoui

13 July 2021 Round 31	CA Bordj Bou Arreridj	0–1	JS Saoura	Bordj Bou Arréridj
20:30		Soccerway report	Amrane 46'	Stadium: Stade 20 Août 1955; Attendance: 0 (close doors); Referee: Dafri

17 July 2021 Round 32	ES Sétif	2–2	JS Saoura	Sétif
21:00	Djabou 50'; Kendouci 90+6'	Soccerway report	Saâd 45'; Amrane 69'	Stadium: Stade 8 Mai 1945; Attendance: 0 (close doors); Referee: Hamza Bouslimani

23 July 2021 Round 33	JS Saoura	2–2	ASO Chlef	Béchar
18:00	Saâd 67'; Amrane 86'	Soccerway report	Dahmani 80'; Bouguettaya 90+1'	Stadium: Stade 20 Août 1955; Attendance: 0 (close doors); Referee: Lyés Bekouassa

27 July 2021 Round 34	US Biskra	1–2	JS Saoura	Biskra
21:00	Ghassiri 32'	Soccerway report	Lahmeri 42'; Messaoudi 82' (pen.)	Stadium: Stade du 18 Février; Attendance: 0 (close doors); Referee: Mustapha Ghorbal

9 August 2021 Round 35	JS Saoura	1–1	CR Belouizdad	Béchar
21:00	Lahmeri 60' (pen.)	Soccerway report	Draoui 39' (pen.)	Stadium: Stade 20 Août 1955; Attendance: 0 (close doors); Referee: Mohamed Saïdi

18 August 2021 Round 36	WA Tlemcen	2–0	JS Saoura	Tlemcen
17:30	Touil 47', 88'	Soccerway report		Stadium: Stade Akid Lotfi; Attendance: 0 (close doors); Referee: Mehdi Abid Charef

21 August 2021 Round 37	JS Saoura	3–1	Paradou AC	Béchar
21:00	Amrane 6'; Saâd 45', 63'	Soccerway report	Boulebina 45+2'	Stadium: Stade 20 Août 1955; Attendance: 0 (close doors); Referee: Abdellah Benchehida

24 August 2021 Round 38	JS Saoura	4–1	AS Aïn M'lila	Béchar
21:00	Saâd 8', 38', 45'; Hammia 65'	Soccerway report	Khelifi 44' (o.g.)	Stadium: Stade 20 Août 1955; Attendance: 0 (close doors); Referee: Nabil Boukhalfa

== Algerian League Cup ==
8 May 2021 Round of 16	JS Saoura	4–0	JSM Skikda	Béchar
22:30	Daoud 26'; Messaoudi 42', 53'; Lahmeri 74' (pen.)			Stadium: Stade 20 Août 1955; Attendance: 0 (close doors); Referee: Mustapha Bessiri
Note: Lineup for JS Saoura - Haouli (Mouyet, 46'), Boutoula, Talah (Akacem, 54'), Kaddour, Amrane, Bouchiba (Hamidi, 54'), Khelifi, Slimani, Messaoudi, Lahmri (Yahia Cherif, 25'), Droueche (Moussaoui, 46').

4 June 2021 Quarter-finals	NC Magra	2–1	JS Saoura	Magra
16:00	Bouchouareb 21'; Meghazi 90'	Report	Hamidi 50'	Stadium: Boucheligue Brothers Stadium; Attendance: 0 (close doors); Referee: Hamza Bouslimani

== Squad information ==
=== Playing statistics ===
No.	Pos	Nat	Player	Total		Ligue 1		League Cup	
No.	Pos	Nat	Player	Apps	Goals	Apps	Goals	Apps	Goals
Goalkeepers
1	GK	(Algeria) ALG	Zakaria Saidi	31	0	31	0	0	0
13	GK	(Algeria) ALG	Aymen Mouyet	5	0	4	0	1	0
16	GK	(Algeria) ALG	Zakaria Haouli	5	0	3	0	2	0
Defenders
3	DF	(Algeria) ALG	Abdelkadir Bensalah	0	0	0	0	0	0
4	DF	(Algeria) ALG	Abdelkrim Allaoui	1	0	1	0	0	0
12	DF	(Algeria) ALG	Oussama Kaddour	15	0	14	0	1	0
14	DF	(Algeria) ALG	Oussama Meddahi	35	1	34	1	1	0
15	DF	(Algeria) ALG	Fateh Talah	18	0	16	0	2	0
17	DF	(Algeria) ALG	Mohamed Amrane	21	4	20	4	1	0
22	DF	(Algeria) ALG	Imadeddine Boubekeur	35	1	34	1	1	0
25	DF	(Algeria) ALG	Adel Bouchiba	38	0	36	0	2	0
	DF	(Algeria) ALG	Merwane Khelif	20	0	19	0	1	0
Midfielders
6	MF	(Algeria) ALG	Abderrazak Khelifi	22	0	20	0	2	0
7	MF	(Algeria) ALG	Abdeldjalil Taki Eddine Saâd	24	10	24	10	0	0
18	MF	(Algeria) ALG	Mohamed Daoud	36	3	35	2	1	1
20	MF	(Algeria) ALG	Walid Belhamri	0	0	0	0	0	0
21	MF	(Algeria) ALG	Belaid Hamidi	36	10	34	9	2	1
26	MF	(Algeria) ALG	Mohamed El Amine Hammia	24	1	24	1	0	0
Forwards
5	FW	(Algeria) ALG	Farouk Slimani	15	0	14	0	1	0
8	FW	(Algeria) ALG	Sid Ali Yahia-Chérif	28	3	27	3	1	0
9	FW	(Algeria) ALG	Billel Messaoudi	24	21	23	19	1	2
10	FW	(Algeria) ALG	Mehdi Droueche	18	1	17	1	1	0
11	FW	(Algeria) ALG	Aimen Lahmeri	24	8	22	7	2	1
19	FW	(Algeria) ALG	Hamza Zaidi	27	3	26	3	1	0
24	FW	(Algeria) ALG	Mohamed Lamine Boutouala	4	0	3	0	1	0
	FW	(Algeria) ALG	Riyane Akacem	22	0	20	0	2	0
Players transferred out during the season

Last updated: 24 August 2021
Source: fr.soccerway.com

=== Goalscorers ===
Includes all competitive matches. The list is sorted alphabetically by surname when total goals are equal.

== Transfers ==
=== In ===
Date	Pos	Player	From club	Transfer fee	Source
6 September 2020	FW	(Algeria) Mehdi Derrouache	CA Bordj Bou Arreridj	Free transfer	
16 September 2020	DF	(Algeria) Mohamed Amrane	CA Bordj Bou Arreridj	Free transfer	

=== Out ===
Date	Pos	Player	To club	Transfer fee	Source
8 October 2020	MF	(Algeria) Khalil Semahi	USM Bel Abbès	Free transfer	
