= 2015–16 JS Saoura season =

JS Saoura
2015–16 season
- Owner: Entreprise Nationale de Forage
- President: Mohamed Zerouati
- Head coach: Bernard Simondi (from 21 June 2015} (until 3 October 2015); Karim Khouda (from 4 October 2015} (until 4 April 2016}
- Stadium: Stade 20 Août 1955
- Ligue 1: Runners–up
- Algerian Cup: Round of 32
- Top goalscorer: League: Moustapha Djallit (10); All: Moustapha Djallit (10); Hamza Zaidi (10)

In the 2015–16 season, JS Saoura competed in the Ligue 1 for the 4th season, as well as the Algerian Cup. in August 2015, Mustapha Kouici was dismissed from his position, and the team's spokesman Mohamed Zerouati said that the new president of the club was the one who took this decision and the contract signed between the two sides allows that.

== Squad list ==
Players and squad numbers last updated on 14 August 2015.
Note: Flags indicate national team as has been defined under FIFA eligibility rules. Players may hold more than one non-FIFA nationality.

No.	Nat.	Position	Name	Date of birth (age)	Signed from
Goalkeepers
1	(Algeria)	GK	Houari Djemili	15 May 1987 (aged 28)	(Algeria) MC Alger
16	(Algeria)	GK	Salah Laouti	27 October 1980 (aged 34)	(Algeria) Youth system
30	(Algeria)	GK	Abdelkader Benameur	15 March 1994 (aged 21)	(Algeria) Youth system
Defenders
3	(Algeria)	LB	Lotfi Dahmri	10 January 1990 (aged 25)	(Algeria) US Chaouia
4	(Algeria)	CB	Hichem Mansouri	11 June 1994 (aged 21)	(Algeria) Youth system
14	(Algeria)	LB	Djilali Terbah	26 July 1988 (aged 27)	(Algeria) USM Blida
23	(Cameroon)	CB	Jean Bapidi	8 March 1989 (aged 26)	(Saudi Arabia) Al-Orobah FC
24	(Algeria)	RB	Mohamed Tiboutine	28 February 1991 (aged 24)	(Algeria) USMM Hadjout
29	(Algeria)	CB	Touhami Sebie	3 May 1988 (aged 27)	(Algeria) AS Khroub
	(Algeria)	CB	Nadjib Maaziz	4 May 1989 (aged 26)	(Algeria) Olympique de Médéa
	(Algeria)	RB	Khaled Toubal	28 June 1986 (aged 29)	(Algeria) USM Annaba
Midfielders
6	(Algeria)	DM	Mohamed Lagraâ	7 November 1986 (aged 28)	(Algeria) ES Sétif
7	(Algeria)	RM	Mohamed El Amine Tiouli	8 July 1987 (aged 28)	(Algeria) WA Tlemcen
8	(Algeria)	DM	Mahfoud Amri	3 November 1988 (aged 26)	(Algeria) Unknown
13	(Algeria)	DM	Nabil Bousmaha	2 December 1990 (aged 24)	(Algeria) Youth system
18	(Algeria)	DM	Messala Merbah	22 July 1994 (aged 21)	(Algeria) US Beni Douala
20	(Ivory Coast)	AM	Zilé Tiéhidé	7 August 1993 (aged 22)	(Senegal) Stade de Mbour
22	(Algeria)	AM	Ziri Hammar	25 July 1992 (aged 23)	(France) AC Arles-Avignon
25	(Algeria)	DM	Riad Gharrich	7 November 1990 (aged 24)	(Algeria) USM Bel-Abbès
26	(Algeria)	LW	Mohamed El Amine Hammia	21 December 1991 (aged 23)	(Algeria) USM Blida
Forwards
9	(Algeria)		Saïd Sayah	Missing required parameter 1=month! 19 (aged 1995–1996)	(Algeria) [[]]
11	(Cameroon)		Christ Mbondi	Missing required parameter 1=month! 19 (aged 1995–1996)	(Algeria) [[]]
15	(Algeria)		Abdenour Belkheir	Missing required parameter 1=month! 19 (aged 1995–1996)	(Algeria) [[]]
17	(Algeria)		Moustapha Djallit	Missing required parameter 1=month! 19 (aged 1995–1996)	(Algeria) [[]]
19	(Algeria)		Hamza Zaidi	Missing required parameter 1=month! 19 (aged 1995–1996)	(Algeria) [[]]

== Competitions ==
=== Overview ===
Competition	Record							
Competition	G	W	D	L	GF	GA	GD	Win %
Ligue 1	30	12	12	6	39	25	+14	40.00
Algerian Cup	2	1	1	0	3	0	+3	50.00
Total	32	13	13	6	42	25	+17	40.63

Competition	Start round	Final position/round	First match	Last match
Ligue 1	—N/a	Runners–up	15 August 2015	27 May 2015
Algerian Cup	Round of 64	Round of 32	19 December 2015	9 January 2016

== League table ==
Pos	Team	Pld	W	D	L	GF	GA	GD	Pts	Qualification or relegation
1	USM Alger (C)	30	17	7	6	49	31	+18	58	Qualification for the Champions League first round
2	JS Saoura	30	12	12	6	39	25	+14	48	Qualification for the Champions League preliminary round
3	JS Kabylie	30	12	9	9	27	27	0	45 (Note: JS Kabylie ahead of CR Belouizdad on head-to-head record: JSK–CRB 1–0, CRB–JSK 1–1.)	Qualification for the Confederation Cup preliminary round
4	CR Belouizdad	30	11	12	7	40	29	+11	45	
5	ES Sétif	30	11	11	8	31	19	+12	44 (Note: ES Sétif ahead of MO Béjaïa on head-to-head record: ESS–MOB 0–0, MOB–ESS 0–0.)	

Updated to match(es) played on 27 May 2016. Source: DZFoot
Rules for classification: 1) points; 2) head-to-head points; 3) head-to-head goal difference; 4) goal difference; 5) total goals; 6) fairplay ranking; 7) playoff.
(C) Champions

=== Results summary ===
Overall								Home						Away					
Pld	W	D	L	GF	GA	GD	Pts	W	D	L	GF	GA	GD	W	D	L	GF	GA	GD
30	12	12	6	39	25	+14	48	9	6	0	26	6	+20	3	6	6	13	19	−6

Last updated: 31 January 2015.
Source: Competitive matches

=== Results by round ===
Round	1	2	3	4	5	6	7	8	9	10	11	12	13	14	15	16	17	18	19	20	21	22	23	24	25	26	27	28	29	30
Ground	A	H	A	H	A	H	A	H	A	H	A	H	A	H	A	H	A	H	A	H	A	H	A	H	A	H	A	H	A	H
Result	D	W	D	D	D	D	L	W	D	D	L	W	L	L	W	D	D	W	W	W	L	W	D	D	W	W	L	D	W	W
Position	7	3	6	7	8	6	9	6	9	9	11	8	9	11	8	10	10	7	6	5	5	3	3	4	3	2	2	4	2	2

Updated to match(es) played on 31 January 2015. Source: Competitive matches
A = Away; H = Home; W = Win; D = Draw; L = Loss

=== Matches ===
Win Draw Loss

14 August 2015 Round 1	USM El Harrach	1 – 1	JS Saoura	Belouizdad
17:00	Khalfallah 40'	Report; Live TV: None	74' Djallit	Stadium: Stade 20 Août 1955; Referee: Aouina, Aouina, Benaissa

22 August 2015 Round 2	JS Saoura	1 – 0	DRB Tadjenanet	Béchar
19:00	Djallit 60'	Report; Live TV: None		Stadium: Stade 20 Août 1955; Referee: Halalchi, Doulache, Abane

29 August 2015 Round 3	MC Alger	0 – 0	JS Saoura	Bologhine
18:00		Report; Live TV: None		Stadium: Stade Omar Hamadi; Attendance: 0 (close doors); Referee: Benouza, Ghomari, Abad

12 September 2015 Round 4	JS Saoura	1 – 1	RC Arbaâ	Béchar
19:00	Zaïdi 28'	Report; Live TV: None	40' Guessan	Stadium: Stade 20 Août 1955; Referee: Zouaoui, Kechida, Haltim

19 September 2015 Round 5	NA Hussein Dey	2 – 2	JS Saoura	Belouizdad
18:00	Guebli 25'; Gasmi 58' (pen.)	Report; Live TV: None	20' Bapidi Fils; 44' Zaïdi	Stadium: Stade 20 Août 1955; Referee: Bachir, Zerhouni, Hadj Said

28 September 2015 Round 6	JS Saoura	1 – 1	ES Sétif	Béchar
18:00	Zaïdi 28'	Report; Live TV: None	87' (pen.) Benyettou	Stadium: Stade 20 Août 1955; Referee: Ghorbal, Serradj, Cherchar

2 October 2015 Round 7	JS Kabylie	2 – 1	JS Saoura	Tizi Ouzou
18:00	Diawara 5', 34'	Report; Live TV: None	75' (pen.) Djallit	Stadium: Stade 1er Novembre 1954; Referee: Aouina, Maâmeri, Benhamouda

17 October 2015 Round 8	JS Saoura	4 – 1	CS Constantine	Béchar
18:00	Merbah 21'; Belkheir 41'; Djallit 55'; Hamia 67'	Report; Live TV: None	88' Sameur	Stadium: Stade 20 Août 1955; Referee: Bachir, Bouali, Hadj Saïd

24 October 2015 Round 9	MC Oran	2 – 2	JS Saoura	Oran
16:00	Benyahia 32' (pen.); Moussi 48' (pen.)	Report; Live TV: Canal Algérie	45+5', 75' Djallit	Stadium: Stade Ahmed Zabana; Referee: Mial, Semsoum, Idir

6 November 2015 Round 11	MO Béjaïa	2 – 1	JS Saoura	Béjaïa
18:00	Yaya 25'; Lakhdari 73'	Report	77' Mbondi	Stadium: Stade de l'Unité Maghrébine; Referee: Houasnia, Badache, Tazrout

20 November 2015 Round 12	JS Saoura	2 – 0	RC Relizane	Béchar
18:00	Zaidi 4'; Bapidi Fils 61'	Report; Live TV: None		Stadium: Stade 20 Août 1955; Referee: Brahimi, Cheballah, Semsoum

24 November 2015 Round 10	JS Saoura	1 – 1	USM Alger	Béchar
18:00	Sayah 52'	Report; Live TV: None	83' Baïteche	Stadium: Stade 20 Août 1955; Referee: Boukhalfa, Etchiali, Zerhouni

28 November 2015 Round 13	CR Belouizdad	2 – 0	JS Saoura	Belouizdad
16:00	Nekkache 25'; Feham 90+2'	Report; Live TV: None		Stadium: Stade 20 Août 1955; Referee: Bouzerrar, Yahi, Messaoudi

11 December 2015 Round 14	USM Blida	2 – 1	JS Saoura	Blida
15:00	Amiri 55'; Sylla 66'	Report; Live TV: None	63' Tiboutine	Stadium: Stade Frères Brakni; Referee: Benouza, Ayad, Ghomari

25 December 2015 Round 15	JS Saoura	4 – 0	ASM Oran	Béchar
18:00	Djallit 8'; Zaidi 11'; Sebie 20'; Belkheir 72'	Report; Live TV: None		Stadium: Stade 20 Août 1955; Referee: Bouslimani, Rimouche, Bourouba

15 January 2016 Round 16	JS Saoura	0 – 0	USM El Harrach	Béchar
18:00		Report; Live TV: None		Stadium: Stade 20 Août 1955; Referee: Saïdi, Abid, Miraoui

22 January 2016 Round 17	DRB Tadjenanet	0 – 0	JS Saoura	Tadjenanet
15:00		Report; Live TV: TV Tamazight 4		Stadium: Lahoua Smaïl Stadium; Referee: Houasnia, Boulekrinet, Badache

30 January 2016 Round 18	JS Saoura	2 – 1	MC Alger	Béchar
18:00	Bapidi 24'; Maâziz 52'	Report; Live TV: None	55' Chita	Stadium: Stade 20 Août 1955; Attendance: 0 (close doors); Referee: Bassiri, Hadj Said, Bourchiou

6 February 2016 Round 19	RC Arbaâ	0 – 1	JS Saoura	Larbaâ
15:00		Report; Live TV: None	47' Hammar	Stadium: Stade Ismaïl Makhlouf; Referee: Zouaoui, Chita, Hitem

12 February 2016 Round 20	JS Saoura	4 – 0	NA Hussein Dey	Béchar
18:00	Djallit 20' (pen.), 31', 90+2'; Zaidi 40'	Report; Live TV: None		Stadium: Stade 20 Août 1955; Referee: Benouza, Ayad, Zerhouni

26 February 2016 Round 21	ES Sétif	3 – 0	JS Saoura	Sétif
16:00	Haddouche 42', 90+2'; Delhoum 63'	Report; Live TV: TV Tamazight 4 / beIN Sports		Stadium: Stade 8 Mai 1945; Referee: Halalchi, Azerine, Doulache

12 March 2016 Round 22	JS Saoura	3 – 0	JS Kabylie	Béchar
18:00	Bapidi 48'; Hammar 57'; Djallit 86'	Report		Stadium: Stade 20 Août 1955; Referee: Achouri, Tamen, Benhamouda

25 March 2016 Round 23	CS Constantine	1 – 1	JS Saoura	Constantine
18:00	Gharbi 23'	Report; Live TV: None	90+5'	Stadium: Stade Mohamed Hamlaoui; Referee: Mial, Allaoua, Yahi

2 April 2016 Round 24	JS Saoura	0 – 0	MC Oran	Béchar
18:00		Report; Live TV: None		Stadium: Stade 20 Août 1955; Referee: Halalchi, Doulache, Azrine

9 April 2016 Round 25	USM Alger	1 – 2	JS Saoura	Bologhine
17:00	Meftah 70' (pen.)	Report; Live TV: None	65' Zaidi; 90' Hamia	Stadium: Stade Omar Hammadi; Referee: Benbrahem, Tamen, Boulfelfel

23 April 2016 Round 26	JS Saoura	1 – 0	MO Béjaïa	Béchar
18:00	Maaziz 37'	Report; Live TV: None		Stadium: Stade 20 Août 1955; Referee: Achouri, Benhamouda, Amri

30 April 2016 Round 27	RC Relizane	1 – 0	JS Saoura	Relizane
16:00	Tiaïba 55'	Report; Live TV: None		Stadium: Stade Tahar Zoughari; Referee: Zouaoui, Kechida, Berouane

16 May 2016 Round 28	JS Saoura	0 – 0	CR Belouizdad	Béchar
18:00		Report; Live TV: None		Stadium: Stade 20 Août 1955; Referee: Benouza, Zerhouni, Ayad

20 May 2016 Round 29	JS Saoura	2 – 1	USM Blida	Béchar
17:30	Bellatreche 78'; Hammar 90+5'	Report; Live TV: EPTV Terrestre	59' Chérif	Stadium: Stade 20 Août 1955; Referee: Saïdi, Beraoui, Abid

27 May 2016 Round 30	ASM Oran	0 – 1	JS Saoura	Oran
17:30		Report; Live TV: EPTV Terrestre	5' Zaidi	Stadium: Stade Habib Bouakeul; Referee: Benbraham, Alloua, Yahi

== Algerian Cup ==
19 December 2015 Round of 64	JS Saoura	3–0	IRB Bou Medfaa	Béchar
14:15	Zaidi 4', 69'; Sayah 49'	Report		Stadium: Stade 20 Août 1955

9 January 2016 Round of 32	NA Hussein Dey	0–0 (a.e.t.) (4–3 p)	JS Saoura	Belouizdad
16:00		Report		Stadium: Stade 20 Août 1955; Referee: Zouaoui, Boulfelfel, Tamen

== Squad information ==
=== Playing statistics ===
No.	Pos	Nat	Player	Total		Ligue 1		Algerian Cup	
No.	Pos	Nat	Player	Apps	Goals	Apps	Goals	Apps	Goals
Goalkeepers
1	GK	(Algeria) ALG	Houari Djemili	28	0	28	0	0	0
16	GK	(Algeria) ALG	Salah Laouti	3	0	2	0	1	0
30	GK	(Algeria) ALG	Abdelkader Benameur	0	0	0	0	0	0
Defenders
3	DF	(Algeria) ALG	Lotfi Dahmri	12	0	12	0	0	0
4	DF	(Algeria) ALG	Hichem Mansouri	5	0	5	0	0	0
6	DF	(Algeria) ALG	Mohamed Lagraâ	30	0	29	0	1	0
14	DF	(Algeria) ALG	Djilali Terbah	4	0	4	0	0	0
23	DF	(Cameroon) CMR	Jean Bapidi Fils	31	5	30	5	1	0
24	DF	(Algeria) ALG	Mohamed Tiboutine	26	1	25	1	1	0
29	DF	(Algeria) ALG	Touhami Sebie	10	1	10	1	0	0
	DF	(Algeria) ALG	Djamel Hadji	1	0	1	0	0	0
	DF	(Algeria) ALG	Khaled Toubel	11	0	11	0	0	0
	DF	(Algeria) ALG	Nadjib Maâziz	20	2	19	2	1	0
Midfielders
7	MF	(Algeria) ALG	Mohamed El Amine Tiouli	9	0	8	0	1	0
8	MF	(Algeria) ALG	Mahfoud Amri	1	0	1	0	0	0
13	MF	(Algeria) ALG	Nabil Bousmaha	29	0	28	0	1	0
18	MF	(Algeria) ALG	Messala Merbah	23	1	22	1	1	0
20	MF	(Ivory Coast) CIV	Zilé André Tiéhidé Rista	3	0	3	0	0	0
22	MF	(Algeria) ALG	Ziri Hammar	16	3	16	3	0	0
25	MF	(Algeria) ALG	Riad Gharrich	8	0	8	0	0	0
26	MF	(Algeria) ALG	Mohamed Hamia	19	3	19	3	0	0
	MF	(Algeria) ALG	Sofiane Ammour	12	0	12	0	0	0
Forwards
9	FW	(Algeria) ALG	Saïd Sayah	19	1	18	1	1	0
15	FW	(Algeria) ALG	Abdenour Belkheir	26	2	25	2	1	0
17	FW	(Algeria) ALG	Moustapha Djallit	30	10	29	10	1	0
19	FW	(Algeria) ALG	Hamza Zaidi	30	8	29	8	1	0
	FW	(Algeria) ALG	Salim Belkheir	1	0	1	0	0	0
	FW	(Algeria) ALG	Oussama Bellatreche	1	0	1	0	0	0
Players transferred out during the season
11	FW	(Cameroon) CMR	Christ Mbondi	2	0	2	0	0	0

Source: Competitions
