= List of JS Saoura seasons =

This is a list of the seasons played by JS Saoura from 2008 when the club first entered a league competition to the most recent seasons. The club's achievements in all major national and international competitions as well as the top scorers are listed. Top scorers in bold were also top scorers of Ligue 1. The list is separated into three parts, coinciding with the three major episodes of Algerian football:

== History ==
The club formed on June 10, 1968, following the merger of the JSB (Jeunesse Sportive Bécharienne) and the ESD (Étoile du Sud de Debdaba) The club was re-established in September 2008 in the municipality of Méridja and was called as Jeunesse Sportive de la Saoura. The club achieved promotion four times in a row to reach in the 2012–13 season to the Algerian Ligue Professionnelle 1 as the first club from the southwest, and with financing from Entreprise Nationale de Forage (ENAFOR) a firm of the petroleum company Sonatrach. the team started to impose itself to achieve in the 2015–16 season the runner-up of the Ligue Professionnelle 1 and two seasons later they achieved the same achievement.

== Seasons ==
Season	League									Cup	Other	Africa		Top goalscorer(s) (Note: Goals in all competitions (Algerian Ligue Professionnelle 1, Algerian Cup, League Cup, African and Super Cup) are counted.)		Ref.
Season	Division	Pos	Pts	P	W	D	L	GF	GA	Cup	Other	Africa		Name	Goals	
2008–09	Régionale II	**1st**														
2009–10	Ligue Inter Régions	**1st**	58	28	17	7	4	39	20							
2010–11	DNA	**1st**	51	24	15	6	3	46	23	R32						
2011–12	Ligue 2	2nd	56	30	17	5	8	48	26	R16				Abdelhak Motrani	18	
2012–13	Ligue 1	9th	38	30	10	8	12	28	26	R64				Kaddour Beldjilali	7	
2013–14	Ligue 1	9th	42	30	13	6	11	38	36	R64				Mohamed Aoudou	10	
2014–15	Ligue 1	13rd	39	30	10	9	11	26	29	R64				Aoudou, Sayah	5	
2015–16	Ligue 1	2nd	48	30	12	12	6	39	25	R32				Moustapha Djallit	10	
2016–17	Ligue 1	5th	45	30	12	9	9	34	30	R16		CAF Champions League	PR	Moustapha Djallit	9	
2017–18	Ligue 1	2nd	54	30	16	6	8	38	27	QF				Djallit, Yahia-Chérif	12	
2018–19	Ligue 1	4th	47	30	13	8	9	33	22	R64		CAF Champions League	Grp	Mohamed El Amine Hammia	9	
2019–20	Ligue 1 (Note: On March 15, 2020, the Ligue de Football Professionnel (LFP) decided to halt the season due to the COVID-19 pandemic in Algeria. On July 29, 2020, the LFP declared that season is over and CR Belouizdad to be the champion, the promotion of four teams from the League 2, and scrapping the relegation for the current season.)	7th	33	22	9	6	7	19	18	R32		Arab Club Champions Cup	R1	Billel Messaoudi	7	
2020–21	Ligue 1	3rd	69	38	20	9	9	60	30	NP	QF			Billel Messaoudi	21	
2021–22	Ligue 1	3rd	60	34	17	9	8	59	23	NP		CAF Confederation Cup	Grp	Aimen Lahmeri	14	
2022–23	Ligue 1	5th	42	30	11	9	10	32	35	SF		CAF Confederation Cup	R2	Oussama Bellatreche	8	
2022–23	Ligue 1	5th	42	30	11	9	10	32	35	SF		Arab Club Champions Cup	R1	Oussama Bellatreche	8	
2023–24	Ligue 1	9th	40	30	11	7	12	34	37	R32				Souibaâh, Bellatreche	6	
2024–25	Ligue 1	4th	43	30	12	7	11	34	36	R32				Oussama Bentaleb	6	
2025–26	Ligue 1	2nd	55	30	16	7	7	40	26	QF				Abdelkader Boutiche	9	
2026–27	Ligue 1									R64						

== Key ==
Key to league record:

- P = Played
- W = Games won
- D = Games drawn
- L = Games lost
- GF = Goals for
- GA = Goals against
- Pts = Points
- Pos = Final position

Key to divisions:

- 1 = Ligue 1
- 2 = Ligue 2
- 3 = DNA
- 4 = Inter-Régions Division
- 5 = Régionale II

Key to rounds:

- DNE = Did not enter
- Grp = Group stage
- R1 = First Round
- R2 = Second Round
- R32 = Round of 32
- R16 = Round of 16
- QF = Quarter-finals
- SF = Semi-finals
- RU = Runners-up
- W = Winners

Champions	Runners-up	Promoted	Relegated

Division shown in bold to indicate a change in division.
Top scorers shown in bold are players who were also top scorers in their division that season.

== Transfers ==
Highest player fees received by JS Saoura
Rank	Name	Nationality	Fee	Buying club	Date	Ref
1	Kaddour Beldjilali	Algeria	€360,000	Étoile du Sahel (Tunisia)	8 July 2014	

== List of JS Saoura players hat-tricks ==
Position key: GK – Goalkeeper; DF – Defender; MF – Midfielder; FW – Forward; ^{4} – Player scored four goals; * – The home team

Player	Position	Against	Result	Time of goals	Date	League	Ref
(Algeria) Moustapha Djallit	FW	NA Hussein Dey	4–0	20'p, 31', 90+2'	12 February 2016	Ligue Professionnelle 1	
(Algeria) Moustapha Djallit	FW	DRB Tadjenanet	4–2	8'p, 28'p, 51'	28 October 2017	Ligue Professionnelle 1	
(Algeria) Sid Ali Yahia-Chérif	FW	MC Alger	4–1	26', 61', 83'	19 May 2018	Ligue Professionnelle 1	
(Algeria) Billel Messaoudi	FW	Volcan Club	5–0	40', 44', 63'	19 August 2019	Arab Club Champions Cup	
(Algeria) Billel Messaoudi^{4}	FW	RC Relizane	5–1	76', 87', 89', 90+2'	22 May 2021	Ligue Professionnelle 1	
(Algeria) Abdeldjalil Saâd	MF	AS Aïn M'lila	4–1	8', 38', 45'	24 August 2021	Ligue Professionnelle 1	
(Algeria) Belaid Hamidi	FW	RC Relizane	6–0	3', 67', 74'p	2 November 2021	Ligue Professionnelle 1	
