= New Béchar Stadium =

Sports venue in Béchar, Algeria

New Béchar Stadium (proposed named)
- Interactive map of New Béchar Stadium (proposed named)
- Location: Béchar, Algeria
- Owner: Ministry of Youth and Sport
- Operator: Ministry of Youth and Sport
- Capacity: 25,000
- Surface: Grass
- Field size: 105 × 68

Construction
- Groundbreaking: 8 August 2024
- Opened: 2027
- Cost: 33 Billion DA
- Builder: Dekinsan

Tenant
- JS Saoura

New Béchar Stadium is a new multi-purpose all-seater stadium currently under construction in Béchar, Algeria. Located 7km north of the commune of Béchar and four km from Boudghene Ben Ali Lotfi Airport. The Directorate of Public Facilities of the Wilaya of Bechar designated, on June 25, 2024, the Algerian subsidiary of the Turkish construction group Dekinsan to build an Olympic park in Bechar.

== Construction ==
On August 8, 2024, the Minister of Housing, Urban Planning and the City, accompanied by the Minister of Youth and Sports Abderrahmane Hammad, gave the official start to the construction works of the new complex in Bechar, which will be allocated to JS Saoura. This project, which covers an area of 40 hectares, includes an indoor football stadium with a capacity of 25,000 seats, an athletics stadium with 6,500 seats, an Olympic swimming pool with 1,200 seats, and a multi-purpose hall with 400 seats, as well as a car park, according to the project's technical sheet. An envelope of more than 33 billion dinars has been allocated for the construction of this new sports infrastructure, the work of which will last 36 months, the ministerial delegation was told.
