= Sikiru Alimi (footballer) =

Nigerian professional footballer

Personal information
- Date of birth: March 23, 1996 (age 30)
- Place of birth: Lagos, Nigeria
- Height: 1.89 m (6 ft 2 in)
- Position: Forward

Team information
- Current team: JS Saoura
- Number: 29

Senior career*
Years	Team	Apps	(Gls)
2015–2016	Warri Wolves	32	(12)
2017–2018	Sunshine Stars	45	(12)
2019–2020	Lobi Stars	29	(14)
2020-2021	Stade Tunisien	11	(1)
2020–2021	Maghreb Fez	22	(3)
2022–2025	Remo Stars	51	(23)
2025–2026	JS Saoura	22	(4)

International career
2019–	Nigeria	3	
- * Club domestic league appearances and goals as of 5 June 2026

Sikiru Alimi (born 23 March 1996) is a Nigerian international footballer that currently plays as a forward.

== Career ==
He started his career with Warri Wolves where he played for two seasons, scoring 12 goals in 31 appearances before signing for Sunshine Stars. He joined Lobi Stars after another two seasons at Sunshine Stars and participated at the club's Champions League campaign.

Alimi had brief stints with Tunisian outfit Stade Tunisien and Maghreb Fez of Morocco before joining Remo Stars in 2021.

== International career ==
He was first called up for the Nigeria B team by Imama Amapakabo for the 2020 African Nations Championship qualification tie against Togo, in a 4–1 defeat at the Stade de Kegue.
