= Hamza Zaidi =

Algerian footballer (born 1990)

Personal information
- Date of birth: 9 November 1990 (age 35)
- Place of birth: Ghardaïa, Algeria
- Position: Forward

Team information
- Current team: CR Témouchent
- Number: 8

Senior career*
Years	Team	Apps	(Gls)
2015–2021	JS Saoura	146	(23)
2021–2022	MC Alger	33	(5)
2022–2023	USM Khenchela	26	(1)
2023–	CR Témouchent	0	(0)
- * Club domestic league appearances and goals as of 15 August 2023

Hamza Zaidi (Arabic: حمزة زايدي; born 9 November 1990) is an Algerian footballer who plays for USM Khenchela as a forward for CR Témouchent.

== Club career ==
In 2021, Zaidi signed a contract with MC Alger.
