= Mohamed Souibaâh =

Algerian footballer (born 1991)

Personal information
- Full name: Mohamed Souibaâh
- Date of birth: 25 December 1991 (age 34)
- Place of birth: Baraki, Algeria
- Height: 1.85 m (6 ft 1 in)
- Position: Striker

Team information
- Current team: NA Hussein Dey
- Number: 19

Senior career*
Years	Team	Apps	(Gls)
2014–2015	IB Khémis El Khechna	–	(–)
2015–2016	Paradou AC	–	(–)
2016–2018	MC Oran	36	(8)
2018–2019	MC Alger	37	(11)
2019	ES Sétif	9	(3)
2020–2021	CR Belouizdad	8	(2)
2022–2024	ASO Chlef	55	(20)
2024–2025	JS Saoura	33	(9)
2025–2026	ES Ben Aknoun	23	(1)
2026–	NA Hussein Dey	0	(0)
- * Club domestic league appearances and goals as of 30 July 2026

Mohamed Souibaâh (Arabic: محمد سويبع; born 25 December 1991 in Baraki) is an Algerian footballer who plays for NA Hussein Dey.

== Club career ==
On 22 July 2016, Souibaâh signed a contract with MC Oran, joining them on a transfer from Paradou AC. In 2020, Souibaâh signed a contract with CR Belouizdad. In 2022, he joined ASO Chlef. On 5 February 2024, he joined JS Saoura.In July 2025, he joined ES Ben Aknoun. On 30 July 2026, he joined NA Hussein Dey.
