= Nour El Islam Fettouhi =

Algerian footballer (born 1999)

Personal information
- Date of birth: 28 August 1999 (age 27)
- Place of birth: Oued Fodda, Algeria
- Height: 1.75 m (5 ft 9 in)
- Position: Winger

Team information
- Current team: JS Saoura
- Number: 10

Youth career
- –2019: ASO Chlef

Senior career*
Years	Team	Apps	(Gls)
2019–2023	ASO Chlef	61	(3)
2023–2024	USM Alger	5	(0)
2024–	JS Saoura	56	(7)
- * Club domestic league appearances and goals as of 5 June 2026

Nour El Islam Fettouhi (Arabic: نور الإسلام فتوحي; born 28 August 1999) is an Algerian professional footballer who plays for USM Alger in the Algerian Ligue Professionnelle 1.

== Career ==
In 2023, Fettouhi joined USM Alger. On 29 January 2024, he joined JS Saoura.

== Honours ==
ASO Chlef

- Algerian Cup: 2022–23

USM Alger

- CAF Super Cup: 2023
