= ES Ben Aknoun =

- Full name: Étoile Sportive Ben Aknoun
- Founded: 1935; 91 years ago
- Ground: 20 August 1955 Stadium
- Capacity: 15,000
- President: Kamel Meberbeche
- Head Coach: Lotfi Boudraa
- League: Ligue 1
- 2025–26: Ligue 1, 8th of 16
Home colours	Away colours

Étoile Sportive Ben Aknoun (Arabic: النجم الرياضي لبن عكنون), known as ES Ben Aknoun or simply ESBA for short, is an Algerian football club based in Hai Ouled Smail in Ben Aknoun. The club was founded in 1935 and its colours are Red black and white. Their home stadium, Mohamed Larbi Abada, has a capacity of 300 spectators but the club receives its opponents in 20 August 1955 Stadium. The club is currently playing in the Algerian Ligue 2.

== History ==
On 5 August 2020, ES Ben Aknoun were promoted to the Algerian Ligue 2. On 2 June 2023, ES Ben Aknoun were promoted to the Ligue 1 for the first time in their history. On 14 June 2024, ES Ben Aknoun were relegated to the Ligue 2. On 27 April 2025, ES Ben Aknoun returned to the Ligue 1.

== Players ==
Algerian teams are limited to four foreign players. The squad list includes only the principal nationality of each player;

=== Current squad ===
As of 31 August 2026 Note: Flags indicate national team as defined under FIFA eligibility rules; some limited exceptions apply. Players may hold more than one non-FIFA nationality.

No.	Pos.	Nation	Player
1	GK	ALG	Mohamed Medjadji
2	DF	ALG	Aymen Chaaraoui
3	DF	ALG	Abdelkader Tamimi
4	DF	ALG	M'Hamed Merouani
5	DF	ALG	Hamza Oukali
7	FW	ALG	Adil Djabout
8	MF	ALG	Mohamed Benchaira
9	FW	ALG	Abdeljalil Saâd
10	FW	ALG	Youcef Bechou
11	FW	ALG	Ahmed Zaouche
13	FW	ALG	Rayane Gacem
14	MF	ALG	Rayan Allam
15	DF	ALG	Fateh Talah
16	GK	ALG	Kheireddine Boussouf

No.	Pos.	Nation	Player
17	DF	ALG	Billal Boukarroum
18	FW	ALG	Diaa Eddine Mechid (on loan from Dynamo Makhachkala)
19	FW	ALG	Lounes Adjout
20	MF	ALG	Aziz Benabdi
21	DF	ALG	Rafik Brahimi
22	MF	ALG	Housseyn Selmi
23	DF	ALG	Aymene Boualleg
24	FW	CIV	Mohamed Sylla
25	MF	ALG	Akram Djahnit
27	DF	ALG	Abderahmane Hachoud (captain)
28	FW	ALG	Aymen Baameur
29	DF	ALG	Mohamed Sari
30	GK	ALG	Amayas Boudedja
-	FW	ALG	Amdjed Niou

== Personnel ==
=== Current technical staff ===
Position	Staff
Head coach	(Algeria) Lotfi Boudraa
Assistant coach	(Algeria) Hocine El Orfi
Goalkeeping coach	(Algeria) Djamel Semallah
Fitness coach	(Algeria) Ouddaï Syphax
Analyst	(Algeria) Yacine Kebir
