= 20 August 1955 Stadium (Béchar) =

Sports venue in Algeria

Coordinates: 31°36′20″N 2°13′06″W

20 August Stadium
- Interactive map of 20 August Stadium
- Full name: 20 August 1955 Stadium
- Location: Place 1er Novembre; Béchar, Algeria
- Owner: OPOW de Béchar
- Capacity: 20,000
- Surface: Artificial turf

Construction
- Opened: 1953
- Renovated: 2012,2013
- Expanded: 2011

Tenant
- JS Saoura

The 20 August 1955 Stadium (Arabic: ملعب 20 أوت 1955, French: Stade du 20 Août 1955) is a multi-use stadium in Béchar, Algeria. It is currently used mostly for football matches and is the home ground of JS Saoura. The stadium has a capacity of 20,000.
