= 2013–14 ASO Chlef season =

ASO Chlef
2013–14 season
- Chairman: Abdelkrim Medouar
- Head coach: Meziane Ighil
- Stadium: Stade Mohamed Boumezrag
- Ligue 1: 8th
- Algerian Cup: Round of 64
- Top goalscorer: League: Noureddine Daham (10); All: Noureddine Daham (10)

In the 2013–14 season, ASO Chlef is competing in the Ligue 1 for the 27th season, as well as the Algerian Cup. It is their 10th consecutive season in the top flight of Algerian football. They will be competing in Ligue 1, and the Algerian Cup.

== Competitions ==
=== Overview ===
Competition	Record								Started round	Final position / round	First match	Last match
Competition	G	W	D	L	GF	GA	GD	Win %	Started round	Final position / round	First match	Last match
Ligue 1	30	11	10	9	29	19	+10	36.67	—N/a	8th	24 August 2013	22 May 2014
Algerian Cup	1	0	0	1	0	2	−2	0.00	Round of 64		7 December 2013	
Total	31	11	10	10	29	21	+8	35.48				

Updated to match played 9 May 2017
Source: Competitions

== League table ==
Pos	Team	Pld	W	D	L	GF	GA	GD	Pts	Qualification or relegation
6	MC Alger	30	13	6	11	26	25	+1	45	Qualification for the Confederation Cup preliminary round
7	RC Arbaâ (Note: RC Arbaâ would have qualified for the CAF Confederation Cup preliminary round by finishing seventh in the 2013–14 Algerian Ligue Professionnelle 1, after the elimination of the USM El Harrach but were unable to participate because they were not adopted by the CAF as a professional team.)	30	12	8	10	33	32	+1	44	
8	ASO Chlef	30	11	10	9	29	19	+10	43	Qualification for the Confederation Cup preliminary round
9	JS Saoura	30	12	7	11	38	36	+2	43	
10	CS Constantine	30	10	11	9	30	31	−1	41	

Updated to match(es) played on 22 May 2014. Source: DZFoot
Rules for classification: 1) points; 2) head-to-head points; 3) head-to-head goal difference; 4) goal difference; 5) total goals; 6) fairplay ranking; 7) playoff.

=== Results summary ===
Overall								Home						Away					
Pld	W	D	L	GF	GA	GD	Pts	W	D	L	GF	GA	GD	W	D	L	GF	GA	GD
30	11	10	9	29	20	+9	43	8	4	3	18	8	+10	3	6	6	11	12	−1

Last updated: 29 December 2014.
Source: Competitive matches

=== Results by round ===
Round	1	2	3	4	5	6	7	8	9	10	11	12	13	14	15	16	17	18	19	20	21	22	23	24	25	26	27	28	29	30
Ground	A	D	A	D	D	A	D	A	D	A	D	A	D	A	D	D	A	D	A	A	D	A	D	A	D	A	D	A	D	A
Result	L	W	D	W	L	D	D	W	D	D	W	W	W	L	D	W	L	W	D	L	L	L	W	L	L	D	D	D	W	W
Position																														

Updated to match(es) played on 29 December 2014. Source: Competitive matches
A = Away; H = Home; W = Win; D = Draw; L = Loss

=== Matches ===
24 August 2013 Round 1	MC Oran	1–0	ASO Chlef	Oran
18:00	Bouaïcha 58'	Report		Stadium: Stade Ahmed Zabana; Referee: Mehdi Abid Charef

31 August 2013 Round 2	ASO Chlef	2–1	CR Belouizdad	Chlef
18:00	Daham 8'; Haddouche 41'	Report	55' (pen.) Hanifi	Stadium: Stade Mohamed Boumezrag; Referee: Rafik Achouri

3 September 2013 Round 3	JSM Béjaïa	1–1	ASO Chlef	Béjaïa
18:00	Coulibaly 7' (pen.)	Report	25' Daham	Stadium: Stade de l'Unité Maghrébine; Referee: Sofiane Bousseter

14 September 2013 Round 4	ASO Chlef	2–0	RC Arbaâ	Chlef
18:00	Daham 16'; Haddouche 90+2'	Report		Stadium: Stade Mohamed Boumezrag; Referee: Mohamed Saïdi

1 October 2013 Round 5	ASO Chlef	0–1	ES Sétif	Chlef
18:00		Report	77' Delhoum	Stadium: Stade Mohamed Boumezrag; Referee: Mohamed Bichari

28 September 2013 Round 6	MC Alger	0–0	ASO Chlef	Algiers
18:00		Report		Stadium: Stade Omar Hamadi; Referee: Mehdi Abid Charef

5 October 2013 Round 7	ASO Chlef	1–1	JS Kabylie	Chlef
18:00	A. Farhi 90+5'	Report	14' Madi	Stadium: Stade Mohamed Boumezrag; Referee: Mokhtar Amalou

19 October 2013 Round 8	CA Bordj Bou Arréridj	1–3	ASO Chlef	Bordj Bou Arréridj
18:00	Bendahmane 62'	Report	51' Zaouche; 68' Messaoud; 75' Boussaid	Stadium: Stade 20 Août 1955; Referee: Redouane Necib

26 October 2013 Round 9	ASO Chlef	0–0	USM Alger	Chlef
18:00		Report	(yellow card) 39' Bouchema; (yellow card) 90+2' Frioui	Stadium: Stade Mohamed Boumezrag; Referee: Mohamed Saïdi

2 November 2013 Round 10	USM El Harrach	0–0	ASO Chlef	Algiers
15:00		Report		Stadium: Stade 1er Novembre 1954; Referee: Boubekeur Zouaoui

9 November 2013 Round 11	ASO Chlef	2–0	MO Béjaïa	Chlef
18:00	Daham 50'; Boussaid 85'	Report		Stadium: Stade Mohamed Boumezrag; Referee: Abderrezzak Arab

23 November 2013 Round 12	JS Saoura	0–1	ASO Chlef	Béchar
15:00		Report	90+1' Daham	Stadium: Stade 20 Août 1955; Referee: Farouk Mial

30 November 2013 Round 13	ASO Chlef	3–0	CS Constantine	Chlef
17:45	Tedjar 4'; Daham 29', 73'	Report		Stadium: Stade Mohamed Boumezrag; Referee: Mohamed Bichari

14 December 2013 Round 14	MC El Eulma	2–1	ASO Chlef	El Eulma
15:00	Chenihi 6'; Zeghidi 19'	Report	56' Meliani	Stadium: Stade Messaoud Zougar; Referee: Djamel Haimoudi

28 December 2013 Round 15	ASO Chlef	0–0	CRB Aïn Fakroun	Chlef
18:00		Report		Stadium: Stade Mohamed Boumezrag; Referee: Mohamed Bachir

17 January 2014 Round 16	ASO Chlef	2–0	MC Oran	Chlef
16:00	Tedjar 79' (pen.); Daham 90+2'	Report		Stadium: Stade Mohamed Boumezrag; Referee: Farouk Mial

1 February 2014 Round 17	CR Belouizdad	1–0	ASO Chlef	Algiers
15:00	Khoudi 26'	Report		Stadium: Stade 20 Août 1955; Referee: Mehdi Abid Charef

8 February 2014 Round 18	ASO Chlef	2–1	JSM Béjaïa	Chlef
18:00	A. Farhi 15'; Messaoud 56'	Report	77' (pen.) O. Meddahi	Stadium: Stade Mohamed Boumezrag; Referee: Mohamed Bachir

15 February 2014 Round 19	RC Arbaâ	0–0	ASO Chlef	Blida
15:00		Report		Stadium: Stade Frères Brakni; Referee: Said Aouina

22 February 2014 Round 20	ES Sétif	1–0	ASO Chlef	Sétif
17:45	Selama 14' (o.g.)	Report		Stadium: Stade 8 Mai 1945; Referee: Farouk Mial

1 March 2014 Round 21	ASO Chlef	0–1	MC Alger	Chlef
17:45		Report	19' Aksas	Stadium: Stade Mohamed Boumezrag; Referee: Boubekeur Zouaoui

8 March 2014 Round 22	JS Kabylie	1–0	ASO Chlef	Tizi Ouzou
15:00	Ebossé Bodjongo 86' (pen.)	Report		Stadium: Stade du 1er Novembre 1954; Referee: Mustapha Ghorbal

15 March 2014 Round 23	ASO Chlef	1–0	CA Bordj Bou Arréridj	Chlef
18:00	Boussaid 31'	Report		Stadium: Stade Mohamed Boumezrag; Referee: Lyés Bekouassa

22 March 2014 Round 24	USM Alger	2–0	ASO Chlef	Algiers
18:00	Feham 56'; Ferhat 75'	Report		Stadium: Stade Omar Hamadi; Referee: Abdelkrim Bouchama

26 April 2014 Round 25	ASO Chlef	0–1	USM El Harrach	Chlef
17:45		Report	41' Boumechra	Stadium: Stade Mohamed Boumezrag; Referee: Abderrezzak Arab

3 May 2014 Round 26	MO Béjaïa	0–0	ASO Chlef	Béjaïa
18:00		Report		Stadium: Stade de l'Unité Maghrébine; Referee: Amine Sekhraoui

10 May 2014 Round 27	ASO Chlef	1–1	JS Saoura	Chlef
17:00	Tedjar 19'	Report	85' Aoudou	Stadium: Stade Mohamed Boumezrag; Referee: Merzak Halalchi

13 May 2014 Round 28	CS Constantine	1–1	ASO Chlef	Constantine
17:00	Berthé 41'	Report	55' Daham	Stadium: Stade Mohamed Hamlaoui; Referee: Farouk Mial

17 May 2014 Round 29	ASO Chlef	2–1	MC El Eulma	Chlef
17:00	Lakhdari 75'; Daham 89'	Report	90' Benachour	Stadium: Stade Mohamed Boumezrag; Referee: Ahmed Bouzrar

24 May 2014 Round 30	CRB Aïn Fakroun	1–4	ASO Chlef	Aïn M'lila
17:00	Daïra 48'	Report	30', 58' Merzougui; 32' Tedjar; 39' Ali Hadji	Stadium: Stade des Frères Demane Debbih; Referee: Abdelkrim Bouchama

== Algerian Cup ==
7 December 2013 Round of 64	MC Alger	2–0	ASO Chlef	Algiers
17:30	Djallit 63'; Hachoud 79'	Repport		Stadium: Stade Omar Hamadi

== Squad information ==
=== Playing statistics ===
No.	Pos	Nat	Player	Total		Ligue 1		Algerian Cup	
No.	Pos	Nat	Player	Apps	Goals	Apps	Goals	Apps	Goals
Goalkeepers
1	GK	(Algeria) ALG	Amara Daïf	5	0	5	0	0	0
12	GK	(Algeria) ALG	Ammar Hamzaoui	5	0	5	0	0	0
40	GK	(Algeria) ALG	Abdelkader Salhi	21	0	21	0	0	0
Defenders
30	DF	(Algeria) ALG	Samir Zaoui	22	0	22	0	0	0
5	DF	(Algeria) ALG	Samir Zazou	26	0	26	0	0	0
25	DF	(Algeria) ALG	Maamar Youcef	2	0	2	0	0	0
4	DF	(Algeria) ALG	Mohammed Ilyas Cherchar	12	0	12	0	0	0
17	DF	(Algeria) ALG	Ibrahim Essaid	3	0	3	0	0	0
24	DF	(Algeria) ALG	Réda Rabhi	5	0	5	0	0	0
27	DF	(Algeria) ALG	Adel Lakhdari	27	1	27	1	0	0
	DF	(Algeria) ALG	Nour El Islam Salah	4	0	4	0	0	0
6	DF	(Benin) BEN	Badarou Nana Nafiou	21	0	21	0	0	0
2	DF	(Algeria) ALG	Mohamed Naâs Laraba	20	0	20	0	0	0
	DF	(Algeria) ALG	Ishak Bouda	1	0	1	0	0	0
Midfielders
22	MF	(Algeria) ALG	Kheireddine Selama	6	0	6	0	0	0
10	MF	(Algeria) ALG	Mohamed Messaoud	19	2	19	2	0	0
14	MF	(Algeria) ALG	Mohamed Zaouche	19	1	19	1	0	0
20	MF	(Algeria) ALG	Mamaar Bentoucha	20	0	20	0	0	0
	MF	(Algeria) ALG	Karim Meliani	25	1	25	1	0	0
8	MF	(Algeria) ALG	Saad Tedjar	23	4	23	4	0	0
23	MF	(Algeria) ALG	Charif Nasseri	1	0	1	0	0	0
16	MF	(Algeria) ALG	Zakaria Haddouche	18	2	18	2	0	0
15	MF	(Algeria) ALG	Ayoub Farhi	17	2	17	2	0	0
29	MF	(Algeria) ALG	Abdelkader Boussaid	20	3	20	3	0	0
	MF	(Libya) LBA	Mohamed Guenaou	3	0	3	0	0	0
Forwards
	FW	(Algeria) ALG	Nourrédine Daham	28	10	28	10	0	0
31	FW	(Algeria) ALG	Karim Ali Hadji	24	1	24	1	0	0
9	FW	(Algeria) ALG	Kheiredine Merzougui	13	2	13	2	0	0
21	FW	(Algeria) ALG	Adil Djabout	3	0	3	0	0	0
	FW	(Algeria) ALG	Ismail Belkacemi	2	0	2	0	0	0
	FW	(Algeria) ALG	Sid-Ali Touili	4	0	4	0	0	0
Players transferred out during the season

Last updated: 9 November 2017
Source: fr.soccerway.com

== Transfers ==
=== In ===
Date	Pos	Player	From club	Transfer fee	Source
30 June 2013	GK	(Algeria) Amara Daïf	USM Alger	Free transfer	
1 July 2013	DF	(Algeria) Nour El Islam Salah	Reserve team	First Professional Contract	
1 July 2013	DF	(Algeria) Mohammed Ilyas Cherchar	(France) AS Nancy B	Free transfer	
1 July 2013	DF	(Algeria) Ibrahim Essaid	RC Kouba	Undisclosed	
1 July 2013	MF	(Algeria) Abdelkader Boussaid	Reserve team	First Professional Contract	
1 July 2013	FW	(Algeria) Adil Djabout	Reserve team	First Professional Contract	
1 July 2013	FW	(Algeria) Kheiredine Merzougui	Reserve team	First Professional Contract	
3 July 2013	MF	(Algeria) Saad Tedjar	USM Alger	Free transfer	
8 July 2013	MF	(Algeria) Karim Meliani	(France) Red Star	Free transfer	
18 July 2013	FW	(Algeria) Noureddine Daham	USM Alger	Free transfer (Released)	
31 July 2013	DF	(Algeria) Adel Lakhdari	ES Sétif	Free transfer	
31 July 2013	DF	(Benin) Badarou Nana Nafiou	(Eswatini) Mbabane Swallows	Undisclosed	
2 January 2014	MF	(Libya) Mohamed Guenaou	(Libya) Al-Ittihad	Undisclosed	

=== Out ===
Date	Pos	Player	To club	Transfer fee	Source
27 June 2013	DF	(Algeria) Farid Mellouli	ES Sétif	Undisclosed	
1 July 2013	DF	(Algeria) Mohamed Amine Aouamri	MC Oran	Free transfer	
1 July 2013	DF	(Algeria) Chemseddine Nessakh	MC Oran	3,800,000 DA	
1 July 2013	MF	(Algeria) Sabri Gharbi	MC Alger	Free transfer	
19 July 2013	FW	(Cameroon) Anicet Eyenga	(Morocco) Olympic Club de Safi	Undisclosed	
31 July 2013	DF	(Algeria) Lyès Saïdi	MC Oran	Free transfer	
