= List of ASO Chlef seasons =

Association Sportive Olympique de Chlef is an Algerian professional football club based in Chlef, Chlef Province. The club was formed on June 13, 1947 as Association Sportive d'Orléansville, and played their first competitive match in 1947. The club has won a total of 3 major trophies, including the national championship 1 time also won the Algerian Cup 2 times.

This is a list of the seasons played by ASO Chlef from 1962 when the club first entered a league competition to the most recent seasons. The club's achievements in all major national and international competitions as well as the top scorers are listed. Top scorers in bold were also top scorers of Ligue 1. The list is separated into three parts, coinciding with the three major episodes of Algerian football:

== Seasons ==
=== After independence ===
Below, the ASO Chlef season-by-season record after independence of Algeria :

Season	League									Cup	Other	Africa		Top goalscorer(s) (Note: Goals in all competitions (Algerian Ligue Professionnelle 1, Algerian Cup, League Cup, African and Super Cup) are counted.)		Ref.
Season	Division	Pos	Pts	P	W	D	L	GF	GA	Cup	Other	Africa		Name	Goals	
1962–63	Critérium Honneur	1st	47	18	13	3	2	41	15	?						
1963–64	Division Honneur	12th	52	30	7	8	15	20	53	R32						
1964–65	Division Honneur	5th	55	26	8	13	5	34	18	R64						
1979–80	Division 1	11th	57	30	9	9	12	24	36	QF				**M'hamed Bouhella**	17	
1980–81	Division 1	Forfeit (Note: Due to the 1980 El Asnam earthquake on October 10, that devastated the entire city of El Asnam, DNC Asnam is forced to forfeit. Given these exceptional circumstances, the club is not relegated to D2.)														
1981–82	Division 1	16th	50	30	4	12	14	24	54	R16						
1982–83	Division 2	1st	62	25	14	9	2	29	9	?				M'hamed Bouhella	14	
1983–84	Division 1	5th	62	30	10	12	8	33	24	R64						
1984–85	Division 1	10th	76	38	11	16	11	25	27	R32						
1985–86	Division 1	3rd	80	38	15	12	11	39	36	R64				Meziane Zaghzi	9	
1986–87	Division 1	3rd	43	38	14	15	9	43	34	QF				Noureddine Azza	16	
1987–88	Division 1	15th	29	34	9	11	14	28	34	R16						
1994–95	Division 1	16th	21	30	6	9	15	30	39	SF				Mourad Ardjaoui	7	
1995–96	Division 2	10th	37	30	10	7	13	22	30	R32						
1996–97	Division 2	4th	45	29	12	9	8	32	22	?						
1997–98	Division 2	8th	38	30	11	5	14	28	32	?	R64					
1998–99	Division 1	3rd	43	26						R64						
1999–2000	National 2	1st	55	26	16	7	3	42	16	?						
2000–01	Division 1	8th	42	30	11	9	10	39	29	?						
2001–02	Division 1	1st	64	29	19	7	3	43	17	R64						
2002–03	Division 1	13th	34	30	7	13	10	25	30	R32						
2003–04	Division 1	8th	40	30	9	13	8	19	22	R16						
2004–05	Division 1	7th	41	30	10	11	9	30	32	**W**						
2005–06	Division 1	3rd	52	30	15	7	8	45	25	R32		CAF Confederation Cup	R1	Mohamed Messaoud	15	
2006–07	Division 1	5th	46	30	12	10	8	29	22	QF		CAF Confederation Cup	R2	Yassine Boukhari	5	
2007–08	Division 1	2nd	49	30	13	10	7	29	22	R16				Hillal Soudani	11	
2008–09	Division 1	9th	44	32	11	11	10	40	43	R16		CAF Champions League	R1	**Mohamed Messaoud**	19	
2009–10	Division 1	13th	43	34	12	7	15	38	41	SF				Mohamed Messaoud	13	
2010–11	Ligue 1	**1st**	63	30	19	6	5	51	20	R16				**Hillal Soudani**	18	
2011–12	Ligue 1	5th	47	30	14	5	11	41	34	QF		CAF Champions League	Grp (Note: The competition ended in the following season)	**Mohamed Messaoud**	16	
2012–13	Ligue 1	10th	38	30	10	8	12	26	29	R16				Mohamed Messaoud	11	
2013–14	Ligue 1	8th	43	30	11	10	9	29	19	R64				Noureddine Daham	10	
2014–15	Ligue 1	15th	36	30	8	12	10	24	28	SF		CAF Confederation Cup	R2	Saad Tedjar	7	
2015–16	Ligue 2	12th	38	30	10	8	12	30	31	R64				Ahmed Kara	7	
2016–17	Ligue 2	7th	40	30	10	10	10	31	31	R16				Mustapha Melika	11	
2017–18	Ligue 2	5th	46	30	11	13	6	30	22	PR				Sofiane Baouche	7	
2018–19	Ligue 2	3rd	52	30	14	10	6	35	23	PR				Fawzi Benhamla	7	
2019–20	Ligue 1 (Note: On March 15, 2020, the Ministry of Youth and Sports decided to stop the season due to the COVID-19 pandemic in Algeria.)	12th	25	21	6	7	8	15	17	R16				Four players	3	
2020–21	Ligue 1	16th	45	38	12	9	17	39	53	NP	PR			Ameur Bouguettaya	8	
2021–22	Ligue 1	9th	50	34	13	11	10	38	31	NP				Mostapha Alili	9	
2022–23	Ligue 1	7th	42	30	11	9	10	36	31	**W**				**Mohamed Souibaâh**	16	
2023–24	Ligue 1	8th	41	30	11	8	11	41	40	R32		CAF Confederation Cup	R1	Yawo Agbagno	13	
2024–25	Ligue 1									R64						

Key to league record:

- P = Played
- W = Games won
- D = Games drawn
- L = Games lost
- GF = Goals for
- GA = Goals against
- Pts = Points
- Pos = Final position

Key to divisions:

- 1 = Ligue 1
- 2 = Ligue 2
- 3 = Division 3

Key to rounds:

- DNE = Did not enter
- Cnl = Cancel
- NP = Not played
- PR = Preliminary round
- Grp = Group stage
- R1 = First Round
- R2 = Second Round
- PO = Play-off round
- R64 = Round of 64
- R32 = Round of 32
- R16 = Round of 16
- QF = Quarter-finals
- SF = Semi-finals
- RU = Runners-up
- W = Winners

Champions	Runners-up	Promoted	Relegated

Division shown in bold to indicate a change in division.
Top scorers shown in bold are players who were also top scorers in their division that season.
