= 2015–16 ASO Chlef season =

ASO Chlef
2015–16 season
- Chairman: Abdelkrim Medouar
- Head coach: Jean-Guy Wallemme
- Stadium: Stade Mohamed Boumezrag
- Ligue 2: 12th
- Algerian Cup: Round of 64
- Top goalscorer: League: Ahmed Kara (7); All: Ahmed Kara (7)

In the 2015–16 season, ASO Chlef is competing in the Ligue 2 for the 15th season, as well as the Algerian Cup. They will be competing in Ligue 1, and the Algerian Cup.

== Competitions ==
=== Overview ===
Competition	Record								Started round	Final position / round	First match	Last match
Competition	G	W	D	L	GF	GA	GD	Win %	Started round	Final position / round	First match	Last match
Ligue 2	30	10	8	12	30	31	−1	33.33	—N/a	12th	14 August 2015	6 May 2015
Algerian Cup	1	0	0	1	1	4	−3	0.00	Round of 64		18 December 2015	
Total	31	10	8	13	31	35	−4	32.26				

== League table ==
Pos	Team	Pld	W	D	L	GF	GA	GD	Pts	Qualification or relegation
10	AS Khroub	30	10	9	11	34	36	−2	39	
11	MC Saïda	30	10	9	11	29	32	−3	39	
12	ASO Chlef	30	10	8	12	30	31	−1	38	
13	JSM Béjaïa	30	9	11	10	25	29	−4	38	
14	US Chaouia (R)	30	9	10	11	26	29	−3	37	2016–17 Championnat National Amateur

Updated to match(es) played on 6 May 2016. Source: DZFOOT.COM
Rules for classification: 1) points; 2) goal difference; 3) number of goals scored.
(R) Relegated

=== Results summary ===
Overall								Home						Away					
Pld	W	D	L	GF	GA	GD	Pts	W	D	L	GF	GA	GD	W	D	L	GF	GA	GD
30	10	8	12	30	21	+9	38	8	4	3	20	10	+10	2	4	9	10	11	−1

Last updated: 31 January 2015.
Source: Competitive matches

=== Results by round ===
Round	1	2	3	4	5	6	7	8	9	10	11	12	13	14	15	16	17	18	19	20	21	22	23	24	25	26	27	28	29	30
Ground	A	H																												
Result	W	D																												
Position	3	2																												

Updated to match(es) played on 31 January 2015. Source: Competitive matches
A = Away; H = Home; W = Win; D = Draw; L = Loss

=== Matches ===
Win Draw Loss

14 August 2015 Round 1	CRB Aïn Fakroun	0–1	ASO Chlef	Aïn Fakroun
17:00		Report	Madouni 89'	Stadium: Stade Allag Abderrahmane; Referee: Benbrahem, Yahi, Allaoua

21 August 2015 Round 2	ASO Chlef	1–1	Paradou AC	Chlef
17:30	Semahi 63'	Report	Chaoui 83'	Stadium: Stade Mohamed Boumezrag

28 August 2015 Round 3	A Bou Saâda	0–0	ASO Chlef	Bou Saâda
17:30		Report		Stadium: Stade Mokhtar Abdelatif

15 September 2015 Round 4	ASO Chlef	1–0	MC El Eulma	Chlef
16:00	Semahi 35'	Report		Stadium: Stade Mohamed Boumezrag

19 September 2015 Round 5	Olympique de Médéa	1–0	ASO Chlef	Médéa
16:30	Belguerfi 45'	Report		Stadium: Stade Imam Lyes

28 September 2015 Round 6	ASO Chlef	1–0	OM Arzew	Chlef
18:00	Benchergui 80'	Report		Stadium: Stade Mohamed Boumezrag

2 October 2015 Round 7	USMM Hadjout	2–0	ASO Chlef	Hadjout
16:30	Soukel 31' (pen.); Benhammouda 88'	Report		Stadium: Stade 5 Juillet 1962; Referee: Helalchi, Ibrahim, Salaouadji

16 October 2015 Round 8	ASO Chlef	3–1	MC Saïda	Chlef
18:00	Semahi 58'; Salah 73'; Kara 86'	Report	Sayah 12'	Stadium: Stade Mohamed Boumezrag

24 October 2015 Round 9	CA Bordj Bou Arréridj	2–2	ASO Chlef	Bordj Bou Arréridj
16:00	Attafen 16'; Bouguelmouna 90+1'	Report	Kara 90+3'; Namani 90+5'	Stadium: August 20, 1955 Stadium

30 October 2015 Round 10	ASO Chlef	1–0	AS Khroub	Chlef
18:00	Namani 47'	Report		Stadium: Stade Mohamed Boumezrag

6 November 2015 Round 11	ASO Chlef	0–0	USM Bel Abbès	Chlef
16:00		Report		Stadium: Stade Mohamed Boumezrag

20 November 2015 Round 12	JSM Béjaïa	2–1	ASO Chlef	Béjaïa
15:00	Frioui 11'; Zeghli 76'	Report	Messaoud 28'	Stadium: Stade de l'Unité Maghrébine

27 November 2015 Round 13	ASO Chlef	1–2	CA Batna	Chlef
15:00	Tatem 75'	Report	Dif 61'; Bahloul 85'	Stadium: Stade Mohamed Boumezrag

11 December 2015 Round 14	US Chaouia	1–1	ASO Chlef	Oum El Bouaghi
15:00	Demane 24'	Report	Kara 6'	Stadium: Stade Hassouna Zerdani

25 December 2015 Round 15	ASO Chlef	2–0	JSM Skikda	Chlef
15:00	Khoudja 48'; Kara 65'	Report		Stadium: Stade Mohamed Boumezrag

16 January 2016 Round 16	ASO Chlef	1–0	CRB Aïn Fakroun	Chlef
15:00	Salah 21'	Report		Stadium: Stade Mohamed Boumezrag

22 January 2016 Round 17	Paradou AC	1–0	ASO Chlef	Algiers
15:00	Chaoui 77'	Report		Stadium: Stade Omar Hamadi

29 January 2016 Round 18	ASO Chlef	0–1	A Bou Saâda	Chlef
15:00		Report	Tebbal 19'	Stadium: Stade Mohamed Boumezrag

5 February 2016 Round 19	MC El Eulma	0–1	ASO Chlef	El Eulma
16:00		Report	Benhocine 16'	Stadium: Stade Messaoud Zougar

12 February 2016 Round 20	ASO Chlef	0–0	Olympique de Médéa	Chlef
15:00		Report		Stadium: Stade Mohamed Boumezrag

26 February 2016 Round 21	OM Arzew	1–0	ASO Chlef	Arzew
15:00	Baouche 55'	Report		Stadium: Stade Menaouer Kerbouci

4 March 2016 Round 22	ASO Chlef	2–1	USMM Hadjout	Chlef
15:00	Semahi 8'; Kara 90+3'	Report	Bendif 75'	Stadium: Stade Mohamed Boumezrag; Referee: Benouza, Serradj, Zerhouni

11 March 2016 Round 23	MC Saïda	1–0	ASO Chlef	Saïda
15:00	Zahzouh 45'	Report		Stadium: Stade 13 Avril 1958

18 March 2016 Round 24	ASO Chlef	0–0	CA Bordj Bou Arréridj	Chlef
15:00		Report		Stadium: Stade Mohamed Boumezrag

1 April 2016 Round 25	AS Khroub	1–1	ASO Chlef	El Khroub
16:00	Dib 86'	Report	Boutiba 90'	Stadium: Stade Abed Hamdani

8 April 2016 Round 26	USM Bel Abbès	2–1	ASO Chlef	Sidi Bel Abbès
16:00	Khali 34'; Bounoua 53'	Report	Semahi 77'	Stadium: Stade 24 Fevrier 1956

15 April 2016 Round 27	ASO Chlef	2–3	JSM Béjaïa	Chlef
16:00	Boutiba 63', 90'	Report	Nait Yahia 44'; Bensaha 69'	Stadium: Stade Mohamed Boumezrag

22 April 2016 Round 28	CA Batna	4–1	ASO Chlef	Batna
16:00	Djeribiaa 7'; Rebouh 48', 61'; Babouche 86'	Report	Larbi 59'	Stadium: Stade 1er Novembre 1954

29 April 2016 Round 29	ASO Chlef	5–1	US Chaouia	Chlef
16:00	Yadroudj 20'; Messaoud 48'; Kara 61', 81'; Boutiba 89'	Report	Saighi 80'	Stadium: Stade Mohamed Boumezrag

6 May 2016 Round 30	JSM Skikda	3–1	ASO Chlef	Skikda
16:00	Boulanseur 31'; Bouchouk 34'; Cheniguer 50'	Report	Yadroudj 79'	Stadium: Stade 20 Août 1955

== Algerian Cup ==
18 December 2015 Round of 64	CR Belouizdad	4–1	ASO Chlef	Belouizdad
16:00	Derrag 22', 46' (pen.), 53'; Bougueroua 90+1'	Report	Elaïd 77'	Stadium: Stade 20 Août 1955; Referee: Mehdi Abid Charef

== Squad information ==
=== Playing statistics ===
No.	Pos	Nat	Player	Total		Ligue 2		Algerian Cup	
No.	Pos	Nat	Player	Apps	Goals	Apps	Goals	Apps	Goals
Goalkeepers
	GK	(Algeria) ALG	Abdelkader Salhi	24	0	24	0	0	0
	GK	(Algeria) ALG	Walid Ouabdi	4	0	3	0	1	0
Defenders
	DF	(Algeria) ALG	Djamel Benchergui	20	1	20	1	0	0
	DF	(Algeria) ALG	Nour El Islam Salah	18	2	18	2	0	0
	DF	(Algeria) ALG	Mohamed Namani	26	2	25	2	1	0
	DF	(Algeria) ALG	Mohamed Merouani	1	0	1	0	0	0
	DF	(Algeria) ALG	Abdelkader Toutaoui	1	0	1	0	0	0
	DF	(Algeria) ALG	Oussama Meddahi	26	0	25	0	1	0
	DF	(Algeria) ALG	Mohamed Naasse Laraba	13	0	13	0	0	0
	DF	(Algeria) ALG	Samir Zazou	24	0	23	0	1	0
	DF	(Algeria) ALG	Mohamed Lokmane Hadjidj	16	0	15	0	1	0
	DF	(Algeria) ALG	Aissa Seddiq Larbi	6	1	6	1	0	0
Midfielders
	MF	(Algeria) ALG	Saad Tedjar	10	0	10	0	0	0
	MF	(Algeria) ALG	Abdelkader Boussaid	27	1	26	1	1	0
	MF	(Algeria) ALG	Zakaria Benhocine	14	1	14	1	0	0
	MF	(Algeria) ALG	Hamza Yadroudj	24	2	23	2	1	0
	MF	(Algeria) ALG	Mohamed Messaoud	18	2	17	2	1	0
	MF	(Algeria) ALG	Abdelkader Kaibou	3	0	3	0	0	0
	FW	(Algeria) ALG	Khalil Semahi	20	5	19	5	1	0
Forwards
	FW	(Algeria) ALG	Hadj Habib Said Fellahi	2	0	2	0	0	0
	FW	(Algeria) ALG	Djebar Akrour	10	0	10	0	0	0
	FW	(Algeria) ALG	Laïd Madouni	14	1	13	0	1	1
	FW	(Algeria) ALG	Ahmed Kara	19	7	19	7	0	0
	FW	(Algeria) ALG	Mourad Ilyes Youcef Khoudja	14	1	13	1	1	0
	FW	(Algeria) ALG	Ahmed Boutiba	8	4	8	4	0	0
	FW	(Algeria) ALG	Sid Ali Touili	18	0	18	0	0	0
	FW	(Algeria) ALG	Seyyid Ali Badni	6	0	6	0	0	0
Players transferred out during the season
	GK	(Algeria) ALG	Ahmed Walid Chouih	3	0	3	0	0	0
	DF	(Algeria) ALG	Sofiane Kheyari	12	0	11	0	1	0
	MF	(Algeria) ALG	Ismail Islam Tatem	9	1	8	1	1	0
	MF	(Algeria) ALG	Ali Sami Yachir	15	0	14	0	1	0

Last updated: 19 November 2017

=== Goalscorers ===
Includes all competitive matches. The list is sorted alphabetically by surname when total goals are equal.

No.	Nat.	Player	Pos.	L 2	AC	TOTAL
	(Algeria)	Ahmed Kara	FW	7	0	7
	(Algeria)	Khalil Semahi	MF	5	0	5
	(Algeria)	Ahmed Boutiba	FW	4	0	4
	(Algeria)	Nour El Islam Salah	DF	2	0	2
	(Algeria)	Mohamed Namani	DF	2	0	2
	(Algeria)	Hamza Yadroudj	MF	2	0	2
	(Algeria)	Mohamed Messaoud	MF	2	0	2
	(Algeria)	Djamel Benchergui	DF	1	0	1
	(Algeria)	Aissa Seddiq Larbi	DF	1	0	1
	(Algeria)	Abdelkader Boussaid	MF	1	0	1
	(Algeria)	Zakaria Benhocine	MF	1	0	1
	(Algeria)	Mourad Ilyes Youcef Khoudja	FW	1	0	1
	(Algeria)	Ismail Islam Tatem	MF	1	0	1
	(Algeria)	Laïd Madouni	FW	0	1	1
Own Goals				0	0	0
Totals				30	1	31

== Transfers ==
=== In ===
Date	Pos	Player	From club	Transfer fee	Source
26 December 2015	MF	(Algeria) Saad Tedjar	MO Béjaïa	Free transfer	
1 January 2016	MF	(Algeria) Zakaria Benhocine	DRB Tadjenanet	Undisclosed	
1 January 2016	FW	(Algeria) Djebar Akrour	RC Relizane	Undisclosed	

=== Out ===
Date	Pos	Player	To club	Transfer fee	Source
15 June 2015	GK	(Algeria) Amara Daïf	MO Béjaïa	Free transfer	
16 June 2015	MF	(Algeria) Saad Tedjar	MO Béjaïa	Undisclosed	
20 June 2015	DF	(Algeria) Adel Lakhdari	MO Béjaïa	Free transfer	
13 July 2015	MF	(Algeria) (France) Karim Meliani	MO Béjaïa	Free transfer	
1 January 2016	GK	(Algeria) Ahmed Walid Chouih	RC Arbaâ	Undisclosed	
1 January 2016	DF	(Algeria) Sofiane Kheyari	(Belgium) Molenbeek	Undisclosed	
1 January 2016	MF	(Algeria) Ismail Islam Tatem	A Bou Saâda	Undisclosed	
1 January 2016	MF	(Algeria) Ali Sami Yachir	RC Arbaâ	Undisclosed	
