= List of Algerian football transfers summer 2021 =

This is a list of Algerian football transfers in the 2021 summer transfer window by club. Clubs in the 2021–22 Algerian Ligue Professionnelle 1 are included.

== Ligue Professionnelle 1 ==
=== ASO Chlef ===
In: Note: Flags indicate national team as defined under FIFA eligibility rules; some limited exceptions apply. Players may hold more than one non-FIFA nationality.

No.	Pos.	Nation	Player
—	MF	ALG	Juba Aguieb (from (Algeria) USM El Harrach)
—	FW	ALG	Youcef Nar Basla (from (Algeria) SC Aïn Defla)
—	FW	ALG	Abdelkader Boussaid (from (Algeria) JSM Skikda)
—	GK	ALG	Sofiane Kacem (from (Algeria) JSM Skikda)
—	DF	ALG	Senoussi Fourloul (from (Algeria) MC Oran)
—	DF	ALG	Achraf Abada (from (Algeria) MC El Eulma)
—	DF	ALG	Abdelhak Sailaa (from (Algeria) MC Alger)
—	FW	ALG	Yacine Aliane (from (Algeria) USM Alger)
—	MF	NIG	Ousseini Soumaila (Unattached)
—	FW	BFA	Yaya Banhoro (from (Brazil) Joinville)

Out: Note: Flags indicate national team as defined under FIFA eligibility rules; some limited exceptions apply. Players may hold more than one non-FIFA nationality.

No.	Pos.	Nation	Player
—	DF	ALG	Islam Chahrour (to (Saudi Arabia) Al-Kholood)
—	FW	ALG	Mohamed Amine Ouis (to (Algeria) JS Saoura)
—	MF	ALG	Kaddour Beldjilali (to (Saudi Arabia) Bisha FC)
—	MF	ALG	Brahim Benzaza (to (Algeria) USM Alger)
—	DF	ALG	Abderrahmane Nehari (to (Algeria) Olympique de Médéa)
—	GK	ALG	Mohamed Amine Sahnoun (Unattached)
—	FW	ALG	Ameur Bouguettaya (to (Algeria) MC Oran)
—	MF	ALG	Mustapha Zeghnoun (to (Algeria) US Biskra)
—	MF	ALG	Mohamed Boulaouidet (to (Algeria) AS Aïn M'lila)

=== CR Belouizdad ===
In: Note: Flags indicate national team as defined under FIFA eligibility rules; some limited exceptions apply. Players may hold more than one non-FIFA nationality.

No.	Pos.	Nation	Player
—	DF	ALG	Ahmed Ait Abdessalem (from (Algeria) JS Kabylie)
—	DF	ALG	Sabri Cheraitia (from (Algeria) Paradou AC)

Out: Note: Flags indicate national team as defined under FIFA eligibility rules; some limited exceptions apply. Players may hold more than one non-FIFA nationality.

No.	Pos.	Nation	Player
—	FW	ALG	Hamza Belahouel (to (Algeria) CS Constantine)

=== CS Constantine ===
In: Note: Flags indicate national team as defined under FIFA eligibility rules; some limited exceptions apply. Players may hold more than one non-FIFA nationality.

No.	Pos.	Nation	Player
—	MF	ALG	Chouaib Debbih (from (Algeria) AS Aïn M'lila)
—	MF	ALG	Mohamed Benchaira (from (Algeria) JS Kabylie)
—	FW	ALG	Hamza Belahouel (from (Algeria) CR Belouizdad)

Out: Note: Flags indicate national team as defined under FIFA eligibility rules; some limited exceptions apply. Players may hold more than one non-FIFA nationality.

No.	Pos.	Nation	Player
—	FW	ALG	Abdelhakim Amokrane (to (Iraq) Al-Shorta SC)

=== ES Sétif ===
In: Note: Flags indicate national team as defined under FIFA eligibility rules; some limited exceptions apply. Players may hold more than one non-FIFA nationality.

No.	Pos.	Nation	Player
—	DF	ALG	Younes Ouasaa (from (Algeria) RC Arbaâ)
—	MF	ALG	Amine Benbelaid (from (Algeria) WA Tlemcen)

Out: Note: Flags indicate national team as defined under FIFA eligibility rules; some limited exceptions apply. Players may hold more than one non-FIFA nationality.

No.	Pos.	Nation	Player
—	FW	ALG	Houssam Ghacha (to (Turkey) Antalyaspor)
—	DF	ALG	Youcef Laouafi (to (Tunisia) Étoile du Sahel)
—	DF	ALG	Ibrahim Bekakchi (to (Algeria) USM Alger)
—	MF	ALG	Messala Merbah (to (Algeria) USM Alger)
—	FW	ALG	Ismaïl Saâdi (to (Algeria) JS Saoura)

=== JS Kabylie ===
In: Note: Flags indicate national team as defined under FIFA eligibility rules; some limited exceptions apply. Players may hold more than one non-FIFA nationality.

No.	Pos.	Nation	Player
—	DF	MLI	Yacouba Doumbia (from (Mali) Stade Malien)

Out: Note: Flags indicate national team as defined under FIFA eligibility rules; some limited exceptions apply. Players may hold more than one non-FIFA nationality.

No.	Pos.	Nation	Player
—	MF	ALG	Oussama Benbot (to (Algeria) USM Alger)
—	MF	ALG	Mohamed Benchaira (to (Algeria) CS Constantine)
—	DF	ALG	Ahmed Ait Abdessalem (to (Algeria) CR Belouizdad)
—	FW	COD	Glody Kilangalanga (Unattached)
—	FW	ALG	Mohamed Zakaria Boulahia (Unattached)
—	FW	ALG	Rezki Hamroune (to (Egypt) Pharco FC)

=== JS Saoura ===
In: Note: Flags indicate national team as defined under FIFA eligibility rules; some limited exceptions apply. Players may hold more than one non-FIFA nationality.

No.	Pos.	Nation	Player
—	FW	ALG	Oussama Bellatreche (from (Algeria) WA Tlemcen)
—	FW	ALG	Ismaïl Saâdi (from (Algeria) ES Sétif)

Out: Note: Flags indicate national team as defined under FIFA eligibility rules; some limited exceptions apply. Players may hold more than one non-FIFA nationality.

No.	Pos.	Nation	Player

=== MC Alger ===
In: Note: Flags indicate national team as defined under FIFA eligibility rules; some limited exceptions apply. Players may hold more than one non-FIFA nationality.

No.	Pos.	Nation	Player
—	MF	ALG	Badreddine Touki (from (Algeria) WA Boufarik)
—	MF	ALG	Youcef El Houari (from (Algeria) USM Annaba)
—	FW	ALG	Seddik Benbournane (from (Algeria) WA Boufarik)
—	DF	ALG	Aymen Attou (from (Algeria) WA Tlemcen)

Out: Note: Flags indicate national team as defined under FIFA eligibility rules; some limited exceptions apply. Players may hold more than one non-FIFA nationality.

No.	Pos.	Nation	Player
—	FW	ALG	Billel Bensaha (loan return to (Tunisia) Espérance de Tunis)
—	DF	ALG	Nabil Lamara (to (Tunisia) Club Africain)

=== MC Oran ===
In: Note: Flags indicate national team as defined under FIFA eligibility rules; some limited exceptions apply. Players may hold more than one non-FIFA nationality.

No.	Pos.	Nation	Player

Out: Note: Flags indicate national team as defined under FIFA eligibility rules; some limited exceptions apply. Players may hold more than one non-FIFA nationality.

No.	Pos.	Nation	Player
—	DF	ALG	Boualem Mesmoudi (to (Tunisia) Étoile du Sahel)

=== NA Hussein Dey ===
In: Note: Flags indicate national team as defined under FIFA eligibility rules; some limited exceptions apply. Players may hold more than one non-FIFA nationality.

No.	Pos.	Nation	Player
—	MF	ALG	Zohir Hamdaoui (from (Algeria) JS Bordj Ménaïel)
—	MF	ALG	Mohamed Bekkouche (from (Algeria) US Chaouia)
—	GK	ALG	Yaakoub Rouag (from (Algeria) ESM Koléa)
—	MF	ALG	Houssem Bayoud (from (Algeria) USM El Harrach)
—	DF	ALG	Kheir Eddine Ali Haïmoud (from (Algeria) Paradou AC)
—	DF	ALG	Mustapha Kheiraoui (from (Algeria) USM Bel Abbès)
—	GK	ALG	Ahmed Boutagga (from (Algeria) MC Alger)

Out: Note: Flags indicate national team as defined under FIFA eligibility rules; some limited exceptions apply. Players may hold more than one non-FIFA nationality.

No.	Pos.	Nation	Player
—	MF	ALG	Laid Ouaji (to (Algeria) JS Kabylie)
—	MF	ALG	Ilyes Sidhoum (to (Algeria) Olympique de Médéa)
—	GK	ALG	Wassim Mimoune (to (Algeria) Olympique de Médéa)
—	DF	ALG	Mohamed Rabie Meftah (to (Algeria) AS Aïn M'lila)
—	DF	ALG	Aymen Boucheriha (to (Algeria) AS Aïn M'lila)
—	MF	ALG	Ibrahim Si Ammar (to (Algeria) RC Relizane)
—	MF	ALG	Mohamed Amine Bouziane (to (Algeria) RC Arbaâ)

=== NC Magra ===
In: Note: Flags indicate national team as defined under FIFA eligibility rules; some limited exceptions apply. Players may hold more than one non-FIFA nationality.

No.	Pos.	Nation	Player
—	DF	ALG	Soheyb Talbi (from (Algeria) JSM Skikda)
—	DF	ALG	Mohamed Oukrif (from (Algeria) WA Tlemcen)
—	GK	ALG	Adel Chellali (from (Algeria) WA Tlemcen)
—	DF	ALG	Oussama Boultouak (from (Algeria) JSM Skikda)
—	FW	ALG	Ramdane Hitala (from (Algeria) RC Relizane)
—	FW	ALG	Abderrezak Kibboua (from (Algeria) Paradou AC)

Out: Note: Flags indicate national team as defined under FIFA eligibility rules; some limited exceptions apply. Players may hold more than one non-FIFA nationality.

No.	Pos.	Nation	Player
—	DF	ALG	Sofiane Khelili (to (Saudi Arabia) Ohod Club)
—	GK	ALG	Zakaria Bouhalfaya (to (Algeria) ES Sétif)
—	DF	ALG	Mohamed Achref Aib (to (Algeria) HB Chelghoum Laïd)
—	FW	ALG	Naoufel Righi (to (Algeria) HB Chelghoum Laïd)
—	FW	ALG	Mounib Benmerzoug (to (Algeria) USM Annaba)

=== Paradou AC ===
In: Note: Flags indicate national team as defined under FIFA eligibility rules; some limited exceptions apply. Players may hold more than one non-FIFA nationality.

No.	Pos.	Nation	Player

Out: Note: Flags indicate national team as defined under FIFA eligibility rules; some limited exceptions apply. Players may hold more than one non-FIFA nationality.

No.	Pos.	Nation	Player
—	MF	ALG	Adem Zorgane (to (Belgium) Charleroi)
—	MF	ALG	Abdelkahar Kadri (to (Belgium) Kortrijk)
—	DF	ALG	Sabri Cheraitia (to (Algeria) CR Belouizdad)

=== USM Alger ===
In: Note: Flags indicate national team as defined under FIFA eligibility rules; some limited exceptions apply. Players may hold more than one non-FIFA nationality.

No.	Pos.	Nation	Player
—	GK	ALG	Oussama Benbot (from (Algeria) JS Kabylie)
—	DF	ALG	Ibrahim Bekakchi (from (Algeria) ES Sétif)
—	MF	ALG	Messala Merbah (from (Algeria) ES Sétif)
—	FW	ALG	Abderrahmane Meziane (from (Tunisia) Espérance de Tunis)

Out: Note: Flags indicate national team as defined under FIFA eligibility rules; some limited exceptions apply. Players may hold more than one non-FIFA nationality.

No.	Pos.	Nation	Player

=== US Biskra ===
In: Note: Flags indicate national team as defined under FIFA eligibility rules; some limited exceptions apply. Players may hold more than one non-FIFA nationality.

No.	Pos.	Nation	Player
—	GK	ALG	Walid Ouabdi (from (Algeria) SC Aïn Defla)
—	FW	ALG	Mohamed Larbi Khoualed (from (Algeria) CRB Ouled Djellal)
—	FW	ALG	Hamza Demane (from (Algeria) AS Aïn M'lila)
—	FW	ALG	Mohamed Fenniri (from (Algeria) Paradou AC)
—	MF	ALG	Ali Amriche (from (Algeria) CA Bordj Bou Arréridj)
—	FW	ALG	Youcef Djahnit (from (Algeria) CS Constantine)
—	MF	ALG	Mustapha Zeghnoun (from (Algeria) ASO Chlef)
—	MF	ALG	Hamza Ounnas (from (Algeria) USM Bel Abbès)
—	FW	ALG	El Hocine Rais (from (Algeria) GC Mascara)

Out: Note: Flags indicate national team as defined under FIFA eligibility rules; some limited exceptions apply. Players may hold more than one non-FIFA nationality.

No.	Pos.	Nation	Player
—	GK	ALG	Nafaa Alloui (to (Algeria) WA Tlemcen)
—	MF	ALG	Mohamed Yacine Athmani (to (Algeria) USM Khenchela)
—	MF	ALG	Salah Eddine Djabou (to (Algeria) AS Aïn M'lila)
—	MF	ALG	Chams-Eddine Haddad (to (Algeria) RC Arbaâ)
—	FW	ALG	Youcef Chibane (to (Algeria) RC Relizane)
—	FW	ALG	Seif Zine Toumi (to (Algeria) RC Arbaâ)
—	MF	ALG	Lyes Renai (to (Algeria) AS Aïn M'lila)

=== Olympique de Médéa ===
In: Note: Flags indicate national team as defined under FIFA eligibility rules; some limited exceptions apply. Players may hold more than one non-FIFA nationality.

No.	Pos.	Nation	Player
—	DF	ALG	Moncef Merouani (from (Algeria) ES Sétif)
—	FW	ALG	Aymen Belbey (from (Algeria) ES Sétif)
—	DF	ALG	Chahine Belloul (from (Algeria) ES Sétif)
—	MF	ALG	Mohamed Djahli (from (Algeria) ES Sétif)
—	FW	ALG	Yasser Berbache (from (Algeria) ES Sétif)
—	GK	ALG	Said Daas (from (Algeria) ES Sétif)
—	FW	ALG	Sid Ali Lakroum (from (Qatar) Al-Markhiya)
—	GK	ALG	Mohamed Lotfi Anis Osmani (from (Algeria) CS Constantine)
—	DF	ALG	Oussama Kaddour (from (Algeria) JS Saoura)
—	MF	ALG	Ilyes Sidhoum (from (Algeria) NA Hussein Dey)
—	DF	ALG	Mourad Bendjelloul (from (Algeria) ASM Oran)
—	FW	ALG	Houssam Bouras (from (Algeria) ASM Oran)
—	MF	ALG	Ahmed Gagaâ (from (Algeria) CA Bordj Bou Arréridj)
—	DF	ALG	Rabah Aït Kaci (from (Algeria) CRB Dar Beida)
—	MF	ALG	Khalil Semahi (from (Algeria) USM Bel Abbès)
—	DF	ALG	Amir Laidouni (from (Algeria) ES Sétif)
—	DF	ALG	Abderrahmane Nehari (from (Algeria) ASO Chlef)
—	GK	ALG	Wassim Mimoune (from (Algeria) NA Hussein Dey)
—	MF	ALG	Youcef Bechou (from (Algeria) CR Belouizdad)
—	FW	ALG	Khier-Anes Belaïd (from (Algeria) ES Sétif)

Out: Note: Flags indicate national team as defined under FIFA eligibility rules; some limited exceptions apply. Players may hold more than one non-FIFA nationality.

No.	Pos.	Nation	Player
—	GK	ALG	Abderrahmane Medjadel (to (Algeria) Paradou AC)
—	DF	ALG	Abdelhak Belkacemi (to (Algeria) HB Chelghoum Laïd)
—	GK	ALG	Fetheddine Alaoui (to (Algeria) HB Chelghoum Laïd)
—	FW	ALG	Tawfiq Elghomari (to (Algeria) USM Annaba)
—	DF	ALG	Hamza Rebai (to (Algeria) CS Constantine)
—	MF	ALG	Zakaria Kemoukh (to (Algeria) HB Chelghoum Laïd)
—	DF	ALG	Tarek Cheurfaoui (to (Algeria) HB Chelghoum Laïd)
—	FW	ALG	Bouzid Dadache (to (Algeria) CR Belouizdad)

=== WA Tlemcen ===
In: Note: Flags indicate national team as defined under FIFA eligibility rules; some limited exceptions apply. Players may hold more than one non-FIFA nationality.

No.	Pos.	Nation	Player
—	DF	ALG	Bilal Tizi Bouali (from (Algeria) JS Kabylie)
—	DF	ALG	Abderrazzak Bentoucha (from (Algeria) MCB Oued Sly)
—	FW	ALG	Amine Amoura (from (Algeria) IRB Maghnia)
—	FW	ALG	Houssam Bahraoui (from (Algeria) JSM Skikda)
—	FW	ALG	Fathallah Belmokhtar (from (Algeria) ASB Maghnia)
—	GK	ALG	Mohamed Bouchaour (from (Algeria) RCB Oued Rhiou)
—	GK	ALG	Nafaa Alloui (from (Algeria) US Biskra)
—	MF	ALG	Mohamed Heriat (from (Algeria) AS Aïn M'lila)
—	FW	ALG	Kouceila Kasdi (from (Algeria) MO Bejaia)
—	FW	ALG	Mohamed Ghali (from (Algeria) MCB Oued Sly)
—	DF	ALG	Racim Mebarki (from (Algeria) JS Kabylie)
—	DF	ALG	Juba Chirani (from (Algeria) Paradou AC)
—	MF	ALG	Charif Nasseri (from (Algeria) JSM Skikda)
—	FW	ALG	Abdelwahid Belgherbi (from (Algeria) USM Bel Abbès)
—	MF	ALG	Redouane Bounoua (from (Algeria) USM Bel Abbès)
—	FW	ALG	Mohamed Seguer (from (Algeria) RC Relizane)

Out: Note: Flags indicate national team as defined under FIFA eligibility rules; some limited exceptions apply. Players may hold more than one non-FIFA nationality.

No.	Pos.	Nation	Player
—	FW	ALG	Oussama Bellatreche (to (Algeria) JS Saoura)
—	MF	ALG	Amine Benbelaid (to (Algeria) ES Sétif)
—	DF	ALG	Aymen Attou (to (Algeria) MC Alger)
—	FW	ALG	Lahouari Touil (to (Iraq) Al-Zawraa SC)
—	DF	ALG	Mohamed Oukrif (to (Algeria) NC Magra)
—	GK	ALG	Adel Chellali (to (Algeria) NC Magra)
—	DF	ALG	Kheireddine Benamrane (to (Algeria) HB Chelghoum Laïd)
—	FW	ALG	Mounir Aichi (to (Algeria) RC Relizane)
—	FW	ALG	Djamel Eddine Zermane (to (Algeria) AS Aïn M'lila)

=== RC Relizane ===
In: Note: Flags indicate national team as defined under FIFA eligibility rules; some limited exceptions apply. Players may hold more than one non-FIFA nationality.

No.	Pos.	Nation	Player
—	FW	ALG	Saddam Hussein Baleh (from (Algeria) USM Annaba)
—	DF	ALG	Abderrahim Abdelli (from (Algeria) USM Bel Abbès)
—	FW	ALG	Mounir Aichi (from (Algeria) WA Tlemcen)
—	DF	ALG	Nasreddine Benlebna (from (Algeria) ES Sétif)
—	MF	ALG	Laid Ouaji (from (Algeria) JS Kabylie)
—	FW	ALG	Youcef Chibane (from (Algeria) US Biskra)
—	MF	ALG	Hichem Abdelli (from (Algeria) RCB Oued Rhiou)
—	MF	ALG	Abbes Noureddine Haddou (from (Algeria) USM Bel Abbès)
—	MF	ALG	Ibrahim Si Ammar (from (Algeria) NA Hussein Dey)

Out: Note: Flags indicate national team as defined under FIFA eligibility rules; some limited exceptions apply. Players may hold more than one non-FIFA nationality.

No.	Pos.	Nation	Player
—	MF	ALG	Younes Koulkheir (to (Algeria) MC Oran)
—	MF	ALG	Mohamed Reda Nekrouf (to (Tunisia) CS Chebba)
—	MF	ALG	Aymen Chadli (to (Algeria) MC Oran)
—	FW	ALG	Houcine Aoued (to (Algeria) Paradou AC)
—	MF	ALG	Abdelmalek Elmenaouer (to (Algeria) HB Chelghoum Laïd)
—	FW	ALG	Ramdane Hitala (to (Algeria) NC Magra)
—	FW	ALG	Mohamed Seguer (to (Algeria) WA Tlemcen)

=== RC Arbaâ ===
In: Note: Flags indicate national team as defined under FIFA eligibility rules; some limited exceptions apply. Players may hold more than one non-FIFA nationality.

No.	Pos.	Nation	Player
—	FW	ALG	Abdelmalek Oukil (from (Algeria) JS Kabylie)
—	MF	ALG	Chams-Eddine Haddad (from (Algeria) US Biskra)
—	MF	ALG	Mohamed Amine Bouziane (from (Algeria) NA Hussein Dey)
—	FW	ALG	Oussama Kismoun (from (Algeria) Paradou AC)
—	FW	ALG	Seif Zine Toumi (from (Algeria) US Biskra)

Out: Note: Flags indicate national team as defined under FIFA eligibility rules; some limited exceptions apply. Players may hold more than one non-FIFA nationality.

No.	Pos.	Nation	Player
—	DF	ALG	Younes Ouasaa (to (Algeria) ES Sétif)
—	FW	ALG	Abdelmalek Oukil (to (Algeria) JS Kabylie)

=== HB Chelghoum Laïd ===
In: Note: Flags indicate national team as defined under FIFA eligibility rules; some limited exceptions apply. Players may hold more than one non-FIFA nationality.

No.	Pos.	Nation	Player
—	DF	ALG	(from (Algeria) )
—	MF	ALG	(from (Algeria) )
—	FW	ALG	(from (Algeria) )
—	DF	ALG	(from (Algeria) )
—	MF	ALG	(from (Algeria) )
—	FW	ALG	(from (Algeria) )

Out: Note: Flags indicate national team as defined under FIFA eligibility rules; some limited exceptions apply. Players may hold more than one non-FIFA nationality.

No.	Pos.	Nation	Player
—	DF	ALG	(to (Algeria) )
—	MF	ALG	(to (Algeria) )
—	FW	ALG	(to (Algeria) )
—	DF	ALG	(to (Algeria) )
—	MF	ALG	(to (Algeria) )
—	FW	ALG	(to (Algeria) )
