= 2010–11 ASO Chlef season =

Association football season

ASO Chlef
2010–11 season
- President: Abdelkrim Medouar
- Head Coach: Meziane Ighil (from 10 July 2010)
- Stadium: Stade Mohamed Boumezrag
- Ligue 1: Champion
- Algerian Cup: Round of 16
- Top goalscorer: League: El Arbi Hillel Soudani (18 goals); All: El Arbi Hillel Soudani (18 goals)

In the 2010–11 season, ASO Chlef is competing in the Ligue 1 for the 20th season, as well as the Algerian Cup. ASO Chlef won the honorary title of winter champion thanks to their logical victory against WA Tlemcen with a score of three goals to nil, this after ES Sétif settled for a draw against CR Belouizdad. ASO Chlef were crowned Algerian champions for the 2010–11 season four rounds before the end of the first professional Ligue 1 football championship, after their direct pursuers CR Belouizdad lost to USM El Harrach 1–0 in the update match of the 26th day.

== Squad list ==
Players and squad numbers last updated on 26 October 2010.
Note: Flags indicate national team as has been defined under FIFA eligibility rules. Players may hold more than one non-FIFA nationality.

No.	Nat.	Position	Name	Date of Birth (Age)	Signed from
Goalkeepers
1	(Algeria)	GK	Mohamed Ghalem	17 October 1977 (aged 32)	(Algeria) USM Blida
19	(Algeria)	GK	El Aid Maamar Kouadri	2 September 1984 (aged 26)	(Algeria) Unknown
28	(Algeria)	GK	Maamar Nadjib Meddah	17 August 1989 (aged 21)	(Algeria) Unknown
Defenders
5	(Algeria)	LB	Samir Zazou	24 March 1980 (aged 30)	(Algeria) USM Annaba
13	(Algeria)	CB	Farid Mellouli	7 July 1984 (aged 26)	(Algeria) MC El Eulma
17	(Algeria)	CB	Moussa Mekioui	5 February 1982 (aged 28)	(Algeria)
21	(Algeria)	RB	Benziane Senouci	5 October 1981 (aged 28)	(Algeria) MC Alger
25	(Algeria)	RB	Maâmar Youcef	3 October 1989 (aged 20)	(Algeria) Youth system
30	(Algeria)	CB	Samir Zaoui	3 June 1976 (aged 34)	(Algeria) Olympique de Médéa
Midfielders
8	(Algeria)	DM	Abdelhak Mohamed Rabah	21 June 1981 (aged 29)	(Algeria) CA Bordj Bou Arréridj
11	(Algeria)	DM	Chérif Abdeslam	1 September 1978 (aged 32)	(Algeria) USM Annaba
14	(Algeria)	AM	Mohamed Zaouche	21 January 1983 (aged 27)	(Algeria) RCB Oued Rhiou
16	(Algeria)	DM	Ismail Bentayeb	12 March 1989 (aged 21)	(Algeria) Youth system
20	(Algeria)	RM	Mâamar Bentoucha	1 August 1981 (aged 29)	(Algeria) MC Saida
22	(Algeria)	CM	Kheireddine Selama	11 December 1987 (aged 22)	(Algeria) Youth system
23	(Algeria)	CM	Charif Nasseri	6 October 1990 (aged 19)	(Algeria) Youth system
26	(Algeria)	DM	Sabri Gharbi	26 May 1987 (aged 23)	(Algeria) Youth system
29	(Algeria)	AM	Lamouri Djediat	20 December 1982 (aged 27)	(Algeria) ES Sétif
Forwards
2	(Algeria)	RW	El Arbi Hillel Soudani	25 November 1987 (aged 22)	(Algeria) Youth system
7	(Algeria)		Karim Ali Hadji	14 May 1981 (aged 29)	(Algeria) Youth system
10	(Algeria)	ST	Mohamed Messaoud	19 November 1981 (aged 28)	(Algeria) USM Annaba
18	(Algeria)	ST	Mohamed Seguer	7 September 1985 (aged 25)	(Algeria) JS Kabylie
27	(Algeria)		Mansour Belhani	1 January 1990 (aged 20)	(Algeria) Youth system
	(Cameroon)	ST	Aimé Gerard Mangolo	27 April 1985 (aged 25)	(Algeria) MC El Eulma
	(Algeria)		Karim Aït Tahar	7 December 1988 (aged 21)	(Algeria) USM Alger
	(Cameroon)	ST	Paul Emile Biyaga	24 July 1987 (aged 23)	(Cameroon) Tonnerre Yaoundé

== Competitions ==
=== Overview ===
Competition	Record								Started round	Final position / round	First match	Last match
Competition	G	W	D	L	GF	GA	GD	Win %	Started round	Final position / round	First match	Last match
Ligue 1	30	19	6	5	51	20	+31	63.33	—N/a	Champion	24 September 2010	8 July 2011
Algerian Cup	3	2	0	1	3	1	+2	66.67	Round of 64	Round of 16	1 January 2011	15 March 2011
Total	33	21	6	6	54	21	+33	63.64				

Updated to match played 22 January 2019
Source: Competitions

=== Ligue 1 ===
==== League table ====
Pos	Team	Pld	W	D	L	GF	GA	GD	Pts	Qualification or relegation
1	ASO Chlef (C)	30	19	6	5	51	20	+31	63	Qualification for the Champions League preliminary round
2	JSM Béjaïa	30	14	8	8	47	32	+15	50	Qualification for the Champions League preliminary round
3	ES Sétif	30	12	11	7	43	31	+12	47	Qualification for the Confederation Cup preliminary round
4	USM El Harrach	30	12	10	8	36	31	+5	46	
5	CR Belouizdad	30	12	9	9	33	26	+7	45	

Updated to match(es) played on 19 April 2018. Source: DZFoot
Rules for classification: 1) points; 2) head-to-head points; 3) head-to-head goal difference; 4) goal difference; 5) total goals; 6) fairplay ranking; 7) playoff.
(C) Champions

==== Results summary ====
Overall								Home						Away					
Pld	W	D	L	GF	GA	GD	Pts	W	D	L	GF	GA	GD	W	D	L	GF	GA	GD
30	19	6	5	51	20	+31	63	14	1	0	33	5	+28	5	5	5	18	15	+3

Last updated: 22 April 2018.
Source: Competitive matches

==== Results by round ====
Round	1	2	3	4	5	6	7	8	9	10	11	12	13	14	15	16	17	18	19	20	21	22	23	24	25	26	27	28	29	30
Ground	A	H	A	H	A	H	A	H	A	H	A	A	H	A	H	H	A	H	A	H	A	H	A	H	A	H	H	A	H	A
Result	L	W	W	W	D	W	D	W	L	W	W	D	L	D	W	W	D	W	W	W	W	D	L	W	L	W	W	D	L	L
Position	16	7	3	4	3	2	3	2	3	2	1	2	1	1	1	1	1	1	1	1	1	1	1	1	1	1	1	1	1	1

Source: Competitive matches
A = Away; H = Home; W = Win; D = Draw; L = Loss

=== Matches ===
Win Draw Loss

24 September 2010 Round 1	JSM Béjaïa	4–1	ASO Chlef	Béjaïa
20:00	Zerdab 17', 43'; Kacem 46'; Maïza 81'	Soccerway report	Messaoud 65'	Stadium: Stade de l'Unité Maghrébine; Referee: Mehdi Abid Charef

1 October 2010 Round 2	ASO Chlef	2–0	USM El Harrach	Chlef
16:00	Soudani 50'; Messaoud 90'	Soccerway report		Stadium: Stade Mohamed Boumezrag; Referee: Mohamed Bouhenni

16 October 2010 Round 3	USM Blida	0–2	ASO Chlef	Blida
17:00		Soccerway report	Soudani 6'; Djediat 45' (pen.)	Stadium: Stade Mustapha Tchaker; Referee: Farouk Mial

22 October 2010 Round 4	ASO Chlef	5–0	MC El Eulma	Chlef
20:00	Soudani 34', 68', 87'; Mohamed Seguer 80'; Djediat 90' (pen.)	Soccerway report		Stadium: Stade Mohamed Boumezrag; Referee: Ali Bouali

26 October 2010 Round 5	JS Kabylie	0–0	ASO Chlef	Tizi Ouzou
17:00		Soccerway report		Stadium: Stade 1er Novembre 1954; Referee: Sofiane Bousseter

29 October 2010 Round 6	ASO Chlef	1–0	MC Alger	Chlef
19:00	Messaoud 79'	Soccerway report		Stadium: Stade Mohamed Boumezrag; Referee: Farouk Houasnia

6 November 2010 Round 7	MC Saïda	1–1	ASO Chlef	Saïda
14:30	Cheraïtia 45'	Soccerway report	Soudani 75'	Stadium: Stade 13 Avril 1958; Referee: Mehdi Abid Charef

12 November 2010 Round 8	ASO Chlef	2–1	MC Oran	Chlef
15:00	Lamouri Djediat 54'; Soudani 57'	Soccerway report	Berradja 78'	Stadium: Stade Mohamed Boumezrag; Referee: Mohamed Bichari

27 November 2010 Round 9	CR Belouizdad	2–1	ASO Chlef	Belouizdad
14:30	Slimani 31'; Bourakba 37'	Soccerway report	Zaoui 68'	Stadium: Stade 20 Août 1955; Referee: Mokhtar Amalou

3 December 2010 Round 10	ASO Chlef	1–0	CA Bordj Bou Arreridj	Chlef
18:00	Messaoud 68'	Soccerway report		Stadium: Stade Mohamed Boumezrag; Referee: Kadda Babrahim

11 December 2010 Round 11	AS Khroub	0–3	ASO Chlef	El Khroub
14:30		Soccerway report	Soudani 20'; Messaoud 33'; Zaouche 81'	Stadium: Stade Abed Hamdani; Referee: Mohamed Bouhenni

18 December 2010 Round 12	USM Annaba	0–0	ASO Chlef	Annaba
14:30		Soccerway report		Stadium: Stade 19 Mai 1956; Referee: Farid Bahloul

24 December 2010 Round 13	ASO Chlef	1–0	ES Sétif	Chlef
18:00	Belkaid 77' (o.g.)	Soccerway report		Stadium: Stade Mohamed Boumezrag; Referee: Sofiane Bousseter

8 March 2011 Round 14	USM Alger	0–0	ASO Chlef	Bologhine
18:00		Soccerway report		Stadium: Omar Hamadi Stadium; Referee: Farouk Houasnia

11 March 2011 Round 15	ASO Chlef	3–1	WA Tlemcen	Chlef
18:00	Soudani 18'; Messaoud 50'; Mongolo 89'	Soccerway report	Boulahia 24'	Stadium: Stade Mohamed Boumezrag; Referee: Mohamed Bichari

19 March 2011 Round 16	ASO Chlef	2–0	JSM Béjaïa	Chlef
18:00	Soudani 53'; Messaoud 76'	Soccerway report		Stadium: Stade Mohamed Boumezrag; Referee: Mohamed Haddada

29 March 2011 Round 17	USM El Harrach	1–3	ASO Chlef	Algiers
15:30	Boualem 53'	Soccerway report	Soudani 20'; Abdeslam 29'; Messaoud 72'	Stadium: Stade 1er Novembre 1954; Referee: Mehdi Abid Charef

1 April 2011 Round 18	ASO Chlef	2–0	USM Blida	Chlef
19:00	Seguer 48'; Soudani 67'	Soccerway report		Stadium: Stade Mohamed Boumezrag; Referee: Mokhtar Amalou

15 April 2011 Round 19	MC El Eulma	2–4	ASO Chlef	El Eulma
17:00	Camara 33'; Boulemdaïs 48'	Soccerway report	Messaoud 6'; Hebbaïche 16' (o.g.); Soudani 25'; Djediat 67'	Stadium: Stade Messaoud Zougar; Referee: Sofiane Bousseter

24 May 2011 Round 20	ASO Chlef	3–0	JS Kabylie	Chlef
20:00	Ali Hadji 31' (pen.); Seguer 42'; Biyaga 54'	Soccerway report		Stadium: Stade Mohamed Boumezrag; Referee: Rafik Achouri

6 June 2011 Round 21	MC Alger	0–1	ASO Chlef	Bologhine
19:00		Soccerway report	Ali Hadji 88'	Stadium: Omar Hamadi Stadium; Referee: Mokhtar Amalou

13 May 2011 Round 22	ASO Chlef	0–0	MC Saïda	Chlef
20:00		Soccerway report		Stadium: Stade Mohamed Boumezrag; Referee: Mohamed Haddada

21 May 2011 Round 23	MC Oran	1–0	ASO Chlef	Oran
17:00	Berradja 44' (pen.)	Soccerway report		Stadium: Ahmed Zabana Stadium; Referee: Mehdi Abid Charef

27 May 2011 Round 24	ASO Chlef	2–1	CR Belouizdad	Chlef
17:00	Mellouli 81'; Ali Hadji 90+5' (pen.)	Soccerway report	Rebih 87'	Stadium: Stade Mohamed Boumezrag; Referee: Sofiane Bousseter

31 May 2011 Round 25	CA Bordj Bou Arreridj	1–0	ASO Chlef	Bordj Bou Arréridj
20:00	Abed Bahtsou 45+1'	Soccerway report		Stadium: Stade 20 Août 1955; Referee: Farouk Mial

11 June 2011 Round 26	ASO Chlef	2–0	AS Khroub	Chlef
20:00	Soudani 56', 61'	Soccerway report		Stadium: Stade Mohamed Boumezrag; Referee: Mohamed Amine Ghorbal

25 June 2011 Round 27	ASO Chlef	4–0	USM Annaba	Chlef
18:00	Seguer 5'; Soudani 10', 90'; Messaoud 47'	Soccerway report		Stadium: Stade Mohamed Boumezrag; Referee: Farouk Houasnia

28 June 2011 Round 28	ES Sétif	2–2	ASO Chlef	Sétif
18:00	Hachoud 48'; Hemani 62'	Soccerway report	Abdeslam 38'; Senouci 75'	Stadium: Stade 8 Mai 1945; Referee: Bouaza Chenane

1 July 2011 Round 29	ASO Chlef	3–2	USM Alger	Chlef
20:30	Messaoud 3'; Soudani 28'; Djediat 57'	Soccerway report	39', 90' Daham	Stadium: Stade Mohamed Boumezrag; Referee: Rafik Achouri

8 July 2011 Round 30	WA Tlemcen	1–0	ASO Chlef	Tlemcen
18:00	Bousehaba 53'	Soccerway report		Stadium: Stade Akid Lotfi; Referee: Boubekeur Zouaoui

== Algerian Cup ==
1 January 2011 Round of 64	ASO Chlef	2–0	WA Tlemcen	Chlef
14:30	Messaoud 13', 52'	Report		Stadium: Stade Mohamed Boumezrag; Referee: Boubekeur Zouaoui
Note: Lineup for ASO Chlef - Ghalem - Abdeslam, Mellouli, Zaoui, Zazou - Zaouche, Mohamed Rabah (Bentocha 66’), Djediat - Messaoud - Seguer (Ali Hadji 71’), Soudani (Naceri 78’).

4 March 2011 Round of 32	ASO Chlef	1–0	CA Bordj Bou Arréridj	Chlef
16:00	Soudani 39'	Report		Stadium: Stade Mohamed Boumezrag; Referee: Farouk Mial
Note: Lineup for ASO Chlef - Ghalem - Senouci, Mellouli, Zaoui, Selama (Biyaga 69’) - Zaouche, Abdeslam, Gharbi - Djediat - Messaoud (Bentoucha 90’), Soudani (Mohamed Rabah 86’).

15 March 2011 Round of 16	MC Saïda	1–0	ASO Chlef	Saïda
12:30	Madouni	Report		Stadium: Stade 13 Avril 1958; Referee: Mokhtar Amalou
Note: Lineup for ASO Chlef - Ghalem - Senouci (Biyaga 46’), Mellouli (Ali Hadji 83’), Zaoui, Zazou - Bentoucha, Abdeslam, Zaouche - Messaoud - Seguer, Mongolo (Soudani 46’).

== Squad information ==
=== Playing statistics ===
No.	Pos	Nat	Player	Total		Ligue 1		Algerian Cup	
No.	Pos	Nat	Player	Apps	Goals	Apps	Goals	Apps	Goals
Goalkeepers
19	GK	(Algeria) ALG	Kouadri El Aid Maamar	5	0	5	0	0	0
1	GK	(Algeria) ALG	Mohamed Ghalem	30	0	27	0	3	0
Defenders
30	DF	(Algeria) ALG	Samir Zaoui	31	1	28	1	3	0
17	DF	(Algeria) ALG	Moussa Mekioui	4	0	4	0	0	0
13	DF	(Algeria) ALG	Farid Mellouli	31	1	28	1	3	0
5	DF	(Algeria) ALG	Samir Zazou	30	0	28	0	2	0
21	DF	(Algeria) ALG	Benziane Senouci	26	1	24	1	2	0
25	DF	(Algeria) ALG	Maâmar Youcef	1	0	1	0	0	0
	DF	(Algeria) ALG	Sebih	1	0	1	0	0	0
Midfielders
26	MF	(Algeria) ALG	Sabri Gharbi	24	0	23	0	1	0
22	MF	(Algeria) ALG	Kheireddine Selama	12	0	11	0	1	0
14	MF	(Algeria) ALG	Mohamed Zaouche	23	1	20	1	3	0
8	MF	(Algeria) ALG	Abdelhak Mohamed Rabah	19	0	17	0	2	0
29	MF	(Algeria) ALG	Lamouri Djediat	26	5	24	5	2	0
20	MF	(Algeria) ALG	Mâamar Bentoucha	26	0	23	0	3	0
11	MF	(Algeria) ALG	Chérif Abdeslam	28	2	25	2	3	0
16	MF	(Algeria) ALG	Ismail Bentayeb	6	0	6	0	0	0
23	MF	(Algeria) ALG	Charif Nasseri	2	0	1	0	1	0
Forwards
2	FW	(Algeria) ALG	El Arbi Hillel Soudani	28	19	25	18	3	1
	FW	(Cameroon) CMR	Paul Emile Biyaga	6	1	4	1	2	0
7	FW	(Algeria) ALG	Karim Ali Hadji	17	3	15	3	2	0
10	FW	(Algeria) ALG	Mohamed Messaoud	31	13	28	11	3	2
18	FW	(Algeria) ALG	Mohamed Seguer	30	4	28	4	2	0
	FW	(Cameroon) CMR	Gerard Mangolo	9	1	8	1	1	0
	FW	(Algeria) ALG	Karim Aït Tahar	2	0	2	0	0	0
Players transferred out during the season

Last updated: 9 November 2017
Source: fr.soccerway.com

== Transfers ==
=== In ===
Date	Pos	Player	from club	Transfer fee	Source
1 July 2010	GK	(Algeria) Mohamed Ghalem	USM Blida	Free transfer	
1 July 2010	DF	(Algeria) Farid Mellouli	MC El Eulma	Free transfer	
1 July 2010	DF	(Algeria) Samir Zazou	USM Annaba	Free transfer	
1 July 2010	DF	(Algeria) Benziane Senouci	MC Alger	Free transfer	
1 July 2010	MF	(Algeria) Chérif Abdeslam	USM Annaba	Free transfer	
1 July 2010	MF	(Algeria) Mâamar Bentoucha	MC Saïda	Free transfer	
1 July 2010	MF	(Algeria) Charif Nasseri	ASO Chlef U21	Free transfer	
1 July 2010	MF	(Algeria) Lamouri Djediat	ES Sétif	Free transfer	
1 July 2010	FW	(Algeria) Mansour Belhani	ASO Chlef U21	Free transfer	
1 July 2010	FW	(Algeria) Mohamed Seguer	JS Kabylie	Free transfer	
1 July 2010	FW	(Algeria) Karim Aït Tahar	USM Alger	Free transfer	
1 July 2010	FW	(Cameroon) Gerard Mangolo	MC El Eulma	Free transfer	
