= 2021–22 ASO Chlef season =

ASO Chlef
2021–22 season
- President: Mohamed Ouahab
- Head coach: Samir Zaoui
- Stadium: Stade Mohamed Boumezrag
- Ligue 1: 9th
- Top goalscorer: League: Mostapha Alili (9 goals); All: Mostapha Alili (9 goals)
- Biggest win: 4–0 vs WA Tlemcen (H) (25 January 2022); Ligue 1
Home colours	Away colours

In the 2021–22 season, ASO Chlef competed in the Ligue 1 for the 31st season. It was their 3rd consecutive season in the top flight of Algerian football. They competed in Ligue 1.

== Squad list ==
Players and squad numbers last updated on 20 October 2021.
Note: Flags indicate national team as has been defined under FIFA eligibility rules. Players may hold more than one non-FIFA nationality.

No.	Nat.	Position	Name	Date of birth (age)	Signed from
Goalkeepers
1	(Algeria)	GK	Sofiane Kacem	11 January 1993 (aged 28)	(Algeria) JSM Skikda
13	(Algeria)	GK	Youssouf Benhemada	26 July 1999 (aged 22)	(Algeria) Youth system
16	(Algeria)	GK	Mohamed Alaouchiche	11 April 1993 (aged 28)	(Algeria) DRB Tadjenanet
Defenders
2	(Algeria)	LB	Abdelkadir Bensalah	4 September 1993 (aged 28)	(Algeria) JS Saoura
3	(Algeria)	LB	Khalfallah Belhaoua	8 November 1988 (aged 33)	(Algeria) CA Batna
4	(Algeria)	RB	Abdellah Meddah	8 March 1999 (aged 22)	(Algeria) US Beni Douala
5	(Algeria)	CB	Abdelhak Sailaa	1 July 1996 (aged 25)	(Algeria) MC Alger
12	(Algeria)	CB	Achref Abada	15 June 1999 (aged 22)	(Algeria) MC El Eulma
20	(Algeria)	CB	Youssef Zahzouh	5 October 1989 (aged 32)	(Algeria) JSM Skikda
21	(Algeria)	CB	Houssem Meharzi	26 January 1997 (aged 24)	(Algeria) AS Khroub
22	(Algeria)	RB	Farouk Benmaarouf	1 January 1997 (aged 25)	(Algeria) Youth system
24	(Algeria)	CB	Mohamed Roufid Arab	24 July 1990 (aged 31)	(Algeria) SKAF Khemis Miliana
26	(Algeria)	RB	Senoussi Fourloul	March 15, 1991 (aged 30)	(Algeria) MC Oran
Midfielders
6	(Algeria)	MF	Khathir Baaziz	17 January 1995 (aged 26)	(Algeria) MC El Eulma
7	(Algeria)	MF	Mohamed Bengrina	24 March 1996 (aged 25)	(Algeria) USM Alger
8	(Algeria)	MF	Abdelkader Boussaid	19 March 1992 (aged 29)	(Algeria) JSM Skikda
10	(Algeria)	MF	Juba Aguieb	28 November 1996 (aged 25)	(Algeria) USM El Harrach
14	(Algeria)	MF	Khalid Dahmani	25 November 1999 (aged 22)	(Algeria) Youth system
18	(Algeria)	MF	Mostapha Alili	30 November 1996 (aged 25)	(Algeria) JSM Tiaret
19	(Algeria)	MF	Islam Merili	27 June 1998 (aged 23)	(Algeria) Youth system
25	(Niger)	MF	Ousseini Soumaila Badamassi	21 April 1999 (aged 22)	Unattached
27	(Algeria)	MF	Youcef Narbesla	3 January 1999 (aged 22)	(Algeria) SC Aïn Defla
Forwards
9	(Algeria)	FW	Nour El Islam Fettouhi	28 August 1999 (aged 22)	(Algeria) Youth system
11	(Algeria)	FW	Yacine Aliane	28 August 1999 (aged 22)	(Algeria) USM Alger
15	(Algeria)	FW	Abdelaziz Litt	12 January 1993 (aged 28)	(Algeria) USM Bel Abbès
17	(Algeria)	FW	Tayeb Lakour	9 February 1999 (aged 22)	(Algeria) WA Boufarik
23	(Burkina Faso)	FW	Yaya Banhoro	1 January 1996 (aged 26)	(Brazil) Joinville

== Competitions ==
=== Overview ===
Competition	Record								Started round	Final position / round	First match	Last match
Competition	G	W	D	L	GF	GA	GD	Win %	Started round	Final position / round	First match	Last match
Ligue 1	34	13	11	10	38	31	+7	38.24	—N/a	9th	23 October 2021	11 June 2022
Total	34	13	11	10	38	31	+7	38.24				

Updated to match played 11 June 2022
Source: Competitions

== League table ==
Pos	Team	Pld	W	D	L	GF	GA	GD	Pts
7	ES Sétif	34	15	9	10	43	24	+19	54 (Note: Paradou AC finished ahead of ES Sétif on head-to-head points: Paradou AC 1–0 ES Sétif, ES Sétif 0–1 Paradou AC.)
8	MC Alger	34	13	12	9	36	24	+12	51
9	ASO Chlef	34	13	11	10	38	31	+7	50 (Note: ASO Chlef finished ahead of US Biskra on head-to-head goal difference: US Biskra 2–1 ASO Chlef, ASO Chlef 2–0 US Biskra.)
10	US Biskra	34	13	11	10	36	32	+4	50
11	MC Oran	34	10	16	8	32	29	+3	46

Updated to match(es) played on 17 June 2022. Source: the-sports.org
Rules for classification: 1) points; 2) head-to-head points; 3) head-to-head goal difference; 4) goal difference; 5) total goals; 6) fairplay ranking; 7) playoff.

=== Results summary ===
Overall								Home						Away					
Pld	W	D	L	GF	GA	GD	Pts	W	D	L	GF	GA	GD	W	D	L	GF	GA	GD
34	13	11	10	38	31	+7	50	7	7	3	19	10	+9	6	4	7	19	21	−2

Last updated: 11 June 2022.
Source: Competitive matches

=== Results by round ===
Round	1	2	3	4	5	6	7	8	9	10	11	12	13	14	15	16	17	18	19	20	21	22	23	24	25	26	27	28	29	30	31	32	33	34
Ground																																		
Result	L	L	D	D	D	D	L	W	L	D	W	L	L	L	W	W	W	D	W	L	W	W	D	W	D	W	W	W	D	L	D	W	D	L
Position	14	17	16	15	14	14	14	12	13	13	11	12	15	17	12	11	11	11	10	11	10	10	10	9	9	9	8	7	9	9	9	9	9	9

Updated to match(es) played on 17 June 2022. Source: Competitive matches
A = Away; H = Home; W = Win; D = Draw; L = Loss

=== Matches ===
The league fixtures were announced on 7 October 2021.

23 October 2021 Round 1	Paradou AC	1–0	ASO Chlef	Dar El Beïda
16:00	Benbouali 43'	Report		Stadium: Omar Benrabah Stadium; Attendance: 0 (Note: The match was played behind closed doors due to the COVID-19 pandemic in Algeria.); Referee: Mohamed Boutaraa

29 October 2021 Round 2	ASO Chlef	0–1	Olympique de Médéa	Chlef
15:00		Report	Nehari 44'	Stadium: Mohamed Boumezrag Stadium; Referee: Abderrezzak Arab

7 November 2021 Round 3	ES Sétif	0–0	ASO Chlef	Sétif
14:30		Report		Stadium: 8 May 1945 Stadium; Attendance: 0 (close doors); Referee: Lotfi Bekouassa

20 November 2021 Round 4	ASO Chlef	0–0	NA Hussein Dey	Chlef
15:00		Report		Stadium: Mohamed Boumezrag Stadium; Referee: Bilal Bendjahene

25 November 2021 Round 5	RC Arbaâ	0–0	ASO Chlef	Boufarik
14:30		Report		Stadium: Mohamed Reggaz Stadium; Referee: Amine Hansal

10 December 2021 Round 7	US Biskra	2–0	ASO Chlef	Biskra
15:00	Mokhtar 50' (pen.), 64'	Report		Stadium: 18 February Stadium; Referee: Lyés Bekouassa

17 December 2021 Round 8	ASO Chlef	2–1	USM Alger	Chlef
15:00	Aguieb 5'; Alili 18'; Merili (yellow card) 28'; Abada (yellow card) 41'	Report	Mahious 88' (pen.); Baouche (yellow card) 90+4'	Stadium: Mohamed Boumezrag Stadium; Referee: Abdelali Ibrir

24 December 2021 Round 9	HB Chelghoum Laïd	1–0	ASO Chlef	Chelghoum Laïd
15:00	Khaldi 80'	Report		Stadium: 11 December 1961 Stadium; Referee: Abderrezzak Arab

28 December 2021 Round 10	ASO Chlef	1–1	JS Kabylie	Chlef
16:00	Sailaa 79' (pen.)	Report	Mouaki 71' (pen.)	Stadium: Mohamed Boumezrag Stadium; Referee: Mohamad Salah Dafri

2 January 2022 Round 11	ASO Chlef	1–0	RC Relizane	Chlef
15:00	Dahmani 61'	Report		Stadium: Mohamed Boumezrag Stadium; Referee: Hamza Boucetta

7 January 2022 Round 12	MC Oran	1–0	ASO Chlef	Oran
18:00	Guenina 56' (pen.)	Report		Stadium: Ahmed Zabana Stadium; Referee: Hamza Bouslimani

11 January 2022 Round 6	ASO Chlef	2–2	JS Saoura	Chlef
18:00	Kerssani 32'; Fourloul 90+2' (pen.)	Report	Hamidi 41' (pen.); Bellatreche 64'	Stadium: Mohamed Boumezrag Stadium

16 January 2022 Round 13	ASO Chlef	1–2	CR Belouizdad	Chlef
15:00	Alili 90+4' (pen.)	Report	Bourdim 62'; Merzougui 68'	Stadium: Mohamed Boumezrag Stadium; Referee: Abdelmoumen Touabti

21 January 2022 Round 14	NC Magra	2–0	ASO Chlef	Magra
15:00	Driss 64'; Bouguèche 72'	Report		Stadium: Boucheligue Brothers Stadium; Referee: Youcef Gamouh

25 January 2022 Round 15	ASO Chlef	4–0	WA Tlemcen	Chlef
14:30	Alili 16', 68'; Aliane 63', 76'	Report		Stadium: Mohamed Boumezrag Stadium; Referee: Mohamed Amine Benzohra

29 January 2022 Round 16	MC Alger	1–2	ASO Chlef	Algiers
17:00	Zaidi 34'	Report	Hadded 33' (o.g.); Fourloul 60' (pen.)	Stadium: Stade du 5 Juillet; Referee: Ali Nader

7 February 2022 Round 17	ASO Chlef	1–0	CS Constantine	Chlef
17:00	Alili 66'	Report		Stadium: Mohamed Boumezrag Stadium; Referee: Hamza Boucetta

25 February 2022 Round 18	ASO Chlef	0–0	Paradou AC	Chlef
17:00		Report		Stadium: Mohamed Boumezrag Stadium; Referee: Abdelmoumen Touabti

1 March 2022 Round 19	Olympique de Médéa	1–2	ASO Chlef	Médéa
15:00	Bellaouel 67'	Report	Dahmani 64'; Litt 89'	Stadium: Imam Lyes Stadium; Referee: Amine Sekhraoui

6 March 2022 Round 20	ASO Chlef	0–1	ES Sétif	Chlef
17:00		Report	Laribi 13'	Stadium: Mohamed Boumezrag Stadium; Referee: Lyés Bekouassa

12 March 2022 Round 21	NA Hussein Dey	0–2	ASO Chlef	Belouizdad
14:30		Report	Aliane 38', 57'	Stadium: 20 August 1955 Stadium; Attendance: 0 (close doors); Referee: Youcef Gamouh

19 March 2022 Round 22	ASO Chlef	2–0	RC Arbaâ	Chlef
15:00	Alili 39' (pen.); Dahmani 63' (pen.)	Report		Stadium: Mohamed Boumezrag Stadium; Referee: Youcef Taieb Bouderbal

28 March 2022 Round 23	JS Saoura	2–2	ASO Chlef	Béchar
16:00	Zahzouh 10' (o.g.); Adrar 60'	Report	Souibaâh 81'; Litt 89'	Stadium: S20 August 1955 Stadium; Referee: Amine Sekhraoui

1 April 2022 Round 24	ASO Chlef	2–0	US Biskra	Chlef
16:00	Fourloul 45+2' (pen.); Baaziz 58'	Report		Stadium: Mohamed Boumezrag Stadium; Referee: Abderrezzak Arab

13 April 2022 Round 25	USM Alger	1–1	ASO Chlef	Bologhine
22:00	Meziane 52'	Report	Souibaâh 81'	Stadium: Omar Hamadi Stadium; Attendance: 0 (close doors); Referee: Mohamed Amine Sakhraoui

17 April 2022 Round 26	ASO Chlef	1–0	HB Chelghoum Laïd	Chlef
23:30	Alili 77' (pen.)	Report		Stadium: Mohamed Boumezrag Stadium; Referee: Lahlou Benbraham

23 April 2022 Round 27	JS Kabylie	0–1	ASO Chlef	Tizi Ouzou
23:30		Report	Alili 63' (pen.)	Stadium: 1 November 1954 Stadium; Referee: Akram Mechairia

29 April 2022 Round 28	RC Relizane	4–5	ASO Chlef	Relizane
15:45	Balegh 11' (pen.), 90' (pen.); Ould Hamou 38'; Belalia 87'	Report	Alili 15' (pen.); Zahzouh 42', 90+5'; Aliane 45+1'; Fourloul 83'	Stadium: Tahar Zoughari Stadium; Referee: Mokrane Batouche

7 May 2022 Round 29	ASO Chlef	1–1	MC Oran	Chlef
16:00	Souibaâh 8'	Report	Dahar 82' (pen.)	Stadium: Mohamed Boumezrag Stadium; Referee: Lyés Bekouassa

14 May 2022 Round 30	CR Belouizdad	3–1	ASO Chlef	Belouizdad
17:00	Belkhir 14' (pen.); Boulakhoua 40', 57'	Report	Souibaâh 22'	Stadium: 20 August 1955 Stadium; Attendance: 0 (close doors); Referee: Said Aouina

21 May 2022 Round 31	ASO Chlef	0–0	NC Magra	Chlef
16:00		Report		Stadium: Mohamed Boumezrag Stadium; Referee: Mustapha Ghorbal

29 May 2022 Round 32	WA Tlemcen	0–2	ASO Chlef	Tlemcen
16:45		Report	Souibaâh 63'; Bengrina 90+4'	Stadium: Colonel Lotfi Stadium; Referee: Elhadj Chihaoui

5 June 2022 Round 33	ASO Chlef	1–1	MC Alger	Chlef
16:00	Fettouhi 90+4'	Report	Abdelhafid 43'	Stadium: Mohamed Boumezrag Stadium; Referee: Houssam Benyahia

11 June 2022 Round 34	CS Constantine	2–0	ASO Chlef	Constantine
16:45	Zermane 12'; Bouldjedri 27'	Report		Stadium: Ramadane Ben Abdelmalek Stadium; Referee: Amine Sekhraoui

== Squad information ==
=== Playing statistics ===
No.	Pos	Nat	Player	Total		Ligue 1	
No.	Pos	Nat	Player	Apps	Goals	Apps	Goals
1	GK	(Algeria) ALG	Sofiane Kacem	22	0	22	0
13	GK	(Algeria) ALG	Youssouf Benhemada	3	0	3	0
16	GK	(Algeria) ALG	Mohamed Alaouchiche	9	0	9	0
2	DF	(Algeria) ALG	Abdelkadir Bensalah	28	0	28	0
3	DF	(Algeria) ALG	Khalfallah Belhaoua	5	0	5	0
4	DF	(Algeria) ALG	Abdellah Meddah	20	0	20	0
5	DF	(Algeria) ALG	Abdelhak Sailaa	3	0	3	0
12	DF	(Algeria) ALG	Achref Abada	25	0	25	0
20	DF	(Algeria) ALG	Youssef Zahzouh	26	2	26	2
21	DF	(Algeria) ALG	Houssem Meharzi	5	0	5	0
22	DF	(Algeria) ALG	Farouk Benmaârouf	12	0	12	0
24	DF	(Algeria) ALG	Mohamed Roufid Arab	16	1	16	1
26	DF	(Algeria) ALG	Senoussi Fourloul	22	4	22	4
23	DF	(Algeria) ALG	Ahmida Zenasni	11	0	11	0
6	MF	(Algeria) ALG	Khathir Baaziz	32	1	32	1
7	MF	(Algeria) ALG	Mohamed Bengrina	16	1	16	1
8	MF	(Algeria) ALG	Abdelkader Boussaid	30	0	30	0
10	MF	(Algeria) ALG	Juba Aguieb	28	1	28	1
14	MF	(Algeria) ALG	Khalid Dahmani	28	3	28	3
18	MF	(Algeria) ALG	Mostapha Alili	28	9	28	9
25	MF	(Niger) NIG	Ousseini Soumaila	0	0	0	0
27	MF	(Algeria) ALG	Youcef Narbesla	6	0	6	0
9	FW	(Algeria) ALG	Nour El Islam Fettouhi	25	1	25	1
11	FW	(Algeria) ALG	Yacine Aliane	28	5	28	5
15	FW	(Algeria) ALG	Abdelaziz Litt	16	2	16	2
17	FW	(Algeria) ALG	Tayeb Lakour	4	0	4	0
23	FW	(Burkina Faso) BFA	Yaya Banhoro	2	0	2	0
19	FW	(Algeria) ALG	Mohamed Souibaâh	14	5	14	5
17	FW	(Algeria) ALG	Zakaria Haddouche	3	0	3	0
	FW	(Algeria) ALG	Boualem Abdelghani Sryer	12	0	12	0
	FW	(Algeria) ALG	Walid Khir	5	0	5	0
Players transferred out during the season
19	MF	(Algeria) ALG	Islam Merili	9	0	9	0

Last updated: 11 June 2022
Source: fr.soccerway.com

=== Goalscorers ===
Includes all competitive matches. The list is sorted alphabetically by surname when total goals are equal.

No.	Nat.	Player	Pos.	L 1	TOTAL
18	(Algeria)	Mostapha Alili	MF	9	9
11	(Algeria)	Yacine Aliane	FW	5	5
26	(Algeria)	Senoussi Fourloul	DF	4	4
19	(Algeria)	Mohamed Souibaâh	FW	5	5
14	(Algeria)	Khalid Dahmani	MF	3	3
15	(Algeria)	Abdelaziz Litt	FW	2	2
20	(Algeria)	Youssef Zahzouh	DF	2	2
10	(Algeria)	Juba Aguieb	MF	1	1
24	(Algeria)	Mohamed Roufid Arab	DF	1	1
6	(Algeria)	Khathir Baaziz	MF	1	1
9	(Algeria)	Nour El Islam Fettouhi	FW	1	1
7	(Algeria)	Mohamed Bengrina	MF	1	1
	(Algeria)	Ayoub Kerssani	FW	1	1
Own Goals				2	2
Totals				38	38

== Transfers ==
=== In ===
Date	Pos	Player	From club	Transfer fee	Source
16 September 2021	MF	(Algeria) Juba Aguieb	USM El Harrach	Free transfer	
16 September 2021	FW	(Algeria) Youcef Nar Basla	SC Aïn Defla	Free transfer	
16 September 2021	FW	(Algeria) Abdelkader Boussaid	JSM Skikda	Free transfer	
18 September 2021	GK	(Algeria) Sofiane Kacem	JSM Skikda	Free transfer	
18 September 2021	RB	(Algeria) Senoussi Fourloul	MC Oran	Free transfer	
26 September 2021	CB	(Algeria) Achref Abada	MC El Eulma	Free transfer	
28 September 2021	CB	(Algeria) Abdelhak Sailaa	MC Alger	Free transfer	
15 October 2021	FW	(Algeria) Yacine Aliane	USM Alger	Free transfer	
20 October 2021	MF	(Niger) Ousseini Soumaila	Unattached	Free transfer	
20 October 2021	FW	(Burkina Faso) Yaya Banhoro	(Brazil) Joinville	Free transfer	
25 February 2022	FW	(Algeria) Mohamed Souibaâh	Unattached	Free transfer	
25 February 2022	FW	(Algeria) Zakaria Haddouche	Unattached	Free transfer	
25 February 2022	DF	(Algeria) Ahmida Zenasni	WA Tlemcen	Free transfer	

=== Out ===
Date	Pos	Player	To club	Transfer fee	Source
29 June 2021	DF	(Algeria) Islam Chahrour	(Saudi Arabia) Al-Kholood	Free transfer	
5 September 2021	FW	(Algeria) Mohamed Amine Ouis	JS Saoura	Free transfer	
11 September 2021	MF	(Algeria) Kaddour Beldjilali	(Saudi Arabia) Bisha FC	Free transfer	
12 September 2021	MF	(Algeria) Brahim Benzaza	USM Alger	Free transfer	
24 September 2021	CB	(Algeria) Abderrahmane Nehari	Olympique de Médéa	Free transfer	
27 September 2021	GK	(Algeria) Mohamed Amine Sahnoun	Unattached	Free transfer	
18 October 2021	FW	(Algeria) Ameur Bouguettaya	MC Oran	Free transfer	
18 October 2021	MF	(Algeria) Mustapha Zeghnoun	US Biskra	Free transfer	
20 October 2021	MF	(Algeria) Mohamed Boulaouidet	AS Aïn M'lila	Free transfer	
8 February 2022	MF	(Algeria) Islam Merili	USM Alger	Free transfer	
