= 2020–21 ASO Chlef season =

ASO Chlef
2020–21 season
- President: Mohamed Ouahab
- Head coach: Fodil Moussi (until 22 January 2021); Nadhir Leknaoui (from 24 January 2021) (until 26 February 2021); Meziane Ighil (from 11 March 2021) (until 11 May 2021); Samir Zaoui (from 11 May 2021)
- Stadium: Stade Mohamed Boumezrag
- Ligue 1: Pre-season
- League Cup: Preliminary round
- Highest home attendance: 0 (Note: no one can attend games due to the COVID-19 pandemic)
- Lowest home attendance: 0 (Note: no one can attend games due to the COVID-19 pandemic)
- Average home league attendance: 0 (Note: no one can attend games due to the COVID-19 pandemic)

In the 2020–21 season, ASO Chlef is competing in the Ligue 1 for the 30th season, and the League Cup It is their 2nd consecutive season in the top flight of Algerian football.

== Squad list ==
Players and squad numbers last updated on 15 November 2020.
Note: Flags indicate national team as has been defined under FIFA eligibility rules. Players may hold more than one non-FIFA nationality.

No.	Nat.	Position	Name	Date of Birth (Age)	Signed from
Goalkeepers
1	(Algeria)	GK	Mohamed Amine Sahnoun	6 July 1994 (aged 26)	(Algeria) JSM Tiaret
13	(Algeria)	GK	Youssouf Benhemada	26 July 1999 (aged 21)	(Algeria) Youth system
16	(Algeria)	GK	Maamar Nadjib Meddah	17 August 1989 (aged 31)	(Algeria) OM Arzew
Defenders
2	(Algeria)	CB	Islam Chahrour	20 March 1990 (aged 30)	(Algeria) CS Constantine
4	(Algeria)		Abdellah Meddah	8 March 1999 (aged 21)	(Algeria) US Beni Douala
5	(Algeria)		Abderrahmane Nehari	9 April 1994 (aged 26)	(Algeria) OM Arzew
21	(Algeria)		Houssem Meharzi	26 January 1997 (aged 23)	(Algeria) AS Khroub
22	(Algeria)	RB	Farouk Benmaarouf	1 January 1997 (aged 24)	(Algeria) Youth system
23	(Algeria)	LB	Mohamed Sabri Benbrahim	19 October 1998 (aged 22)	(Tunisia) US Tataouine
24	(Algeria)	CB	Mohamed Roufid Arab	24 July 1990 (aged 30)	(Algeria) ?
27	(Algeria)	LB	Khalfallah Belhaoua	8 November 1988 (aged 32)	(Algeria) CA Batna
Midfielders
3	(Algeria)	DM	Brahim Benzaza	8 April 1997 (aged 23)	(Algeria) ES Mostaganem
6	(Algeria)	AM	Khathir Baaziz	17 January 1995 (aged 25)	(Algeria) MC El Eulma
7	(Algeria)	AM	Mohamed Bengrina	24 March 1996 (aged 24)	(Algeria) USM Alger
10	(Algeria)	AM	Kaddour Beldjilali	28 November 1988 (aged 32)	(Algeria) JS Saoura
14	(Algeria)	AM	Khalid Dahmani	25 November 1999 (aged 21)	(Algeria) ?
15	(Algeria)	AM	Fawzi Benhamla	19 January 1989 (aged 31)	(Algeria) US Biskra
18	(Algeria)	AM	Mostapha Alili	30 November 1996 (aged 24)	(Algeria) JSM Tiaret
19	(Algeria)	AM	Islam Merili	27 June 1998 (aged 22)	(Algeria) Youth system
20	(Algeria)	AM	Mustapha Zeghnoun	30 June 1991 (aged 29)	(Algeria) JSM Skikda
Forwards
8	(Algeria)		Féthi Tahar	22 January 1994 (aged 26)	(Algeria) RC Relizane
9	(Algeria)		Nour El Islam Fettouhi	28 August 1999 (aged 21)	(Algeria) Youth system
11	(Algeria)	ST	Mohamed Boulaouidet	2 May 1990 (aged 30)	(Sudan) Al-Hilal Club
17	(Algeria)	LW	Tayeb Lakour	9 February 1999 (aged 21)	(Algeria) WA Boufarik
25	(Algeria)	ST	Ameur Bouguettaya	21 July 1995 (aged 25)	(Algeria) USM Bel Abbès
26	(Algeria)		Mohamed Amine Ouis	6 December 1992 (aged 28)	(Algeria) MC Saïda
29	(Algeria)	LW	Sofiane Khedim	19 September 1995 (aged 25)	(France) FC Rousset SVO

== Competitions ==
=== Overview ===
Competition	Record								Started round	Final position / round	First match	Last match
Competition	G	W	D	L	GF	GA	GD	Win %	Started round	Final position / round	First match	Last match
Ligue 1	0	0	0	0	0	0	+0	—	—N/a	To be confirmed	In Progress	In Progress
League Cup	1	0	0	1	1	2	−1	0.00	Preliminary round		20 April 2021	
Total	0	0	0	0	0	0	+0	—				

Updated to match played 7 March 2020
Source: Competitions

== League table ==
Pos	Team	Pld	W	D	L	GF	GA	GD	Pts	Qualification or relegation
14	US Biskra	38	11	13	14	32	46	−14	46	
15	WA Tlemcen	38	12	9	17	40	47	−7	45	
16	ASO Chlef	38	12	9	17	39	53	−14	45	
17	AS Aïn M'lila (R)	38	13	8	17	38	53	−15	44 (Note: On May 30, 2021 after the participation of a penalized player Hamza Ziad against JS Kabylie, AS Ain M'lila Lost the match 3–0 and deducted 3 points.)	Relegation to Ligue 2
18	USM Bel Abbès (R)	38	9	11	18	32	58	−26	38	Relegation to Ligue 2

Updated to match(es) played on 28 August 2021. Source: dzfoot.com
Rules for classification: 1) points; 2) head-to-head points; 3) head-to-head goal difference; 4) goal difference; 5) total goals; 6) fairplay ranking; 7) playoff.
(R) Relegated

=== Results summary ===
Overall								Home						Away					
Pld	W	D	L	GF	GA	GD	Pts	W	D	L	GF	GA	GD	W	D	L	GF	GA	GD
0	0	0	0	0	0	0	0	0	0	0	0	0	0	0	0	0	0	0	0

Last updated: 7 March 2020.
Source: Competitive matches

=== Results by round ===
Round	1	2	3	4	5	6	7	8	9	10	11	12	13	14	15	16	17	18	19	20	21	22	23	24	25	26	27	28	29	30	31	32	33	34	35	36	37	38
Ground																																						
Result	L	W	D	L	W	W	L	W	L	W	L	L	L	L	L	L	L	W	D	L	W	D	L	W	L	D	L	D	W	W	L	D	D	D	D	W	L	W
Position	16	8	8	13	8	6	8	7	10	7	10	11	13	13	15	15	15	14	14	14	12	12	12	13	13	13	13	15	13	13	13	16	15	16	16	16	17	16

Updated to match(es) played on 24 August 2021. Source: Competitive matches
A = Away; H = Home; W = Win; D = Draw; L = Loss

=== Matches ===
On 22 October 2020, the Algerian Ligue Professionnelle 1 fixtures were announced.

28 November 2020 Round 1	NC Magra	3–2	ASO Chlef	Magra
14:30	Aïb 33'; Demane 61'; Bouguèche 90+3'	Soccerway report	Beldjilali 50' (pen.), 81' (pen.)	Stadium: Boucheligue Brothers Stadium; Attendance: 0 (close doors); Referee: Houssam Benyahia

5 December 2020 Round 2	ASO Chlef	1–0	WA Tlemcen	Chlef
16:00	Beldjilali 18'	Soccerway report		Stadium: Stade Mohamed Boumezrag; Attendance: 0 (close doors); Referee: Abdelmoumen Touabti

12 December 2020 Round 3	CS Constantine	0–0	ASO Chlef	Constantine
14:30		Soccerway report		Stadium: Ben-Abdelmalek Stadium; Attendance: 0 (close doors); Referee: Lyés Bekouassa

18 December 2020 Round 4	ASO Chlef	0–2	JS Kabylie	Chlef
15:00		Soccerway report	Bensayah 53'; Hamroune 68' (pen.)	Stadium: Stade Mohamed Boumezrag; Attendance: 0 (close doors); Referee: Said Aouina

23 December 2020 Round 5	JSM Skikda	1–4	ASO Chlef	Skikda
14:30	Merzougi 68'	Soccerway report	Beldjilali 38', 56'; Bengrina 82'; Merili 89' (pen.)	Stadium: Stade 20 Août 1955; Attendance: 0 (close doors); Referee: Ahmed Bouzrar

27 December 2020 Round 6	ASO Chlef	4–1	USM Bel Abbès	Chlef
15:00	Arab 45+1'; Ouis 53'; Tahar 56'; Alili 88'	Soccerway report	Soltani 66'	Stadium: Stade Mohamed Boumezrag; Attendance: 0 (close doors); Referee: Redouane Necib

8 January 2021 Round 7	NA Hussein Dey	1–0	ASO Chlef	Belouizdad
14:30	Si Ammar 85'	Soccerway report		Stadium: Stade 20 Août 1955; Attendance: 0 (close doors); Referee: Mustapha Ghorbal

15 January 2021 Round 8	ASO Chlef	2–0	CA Bordj Bou Arreridj	Chlef
14:30	Meharzi 90+3'; Tahar 90+9'	Soccerway report		Stadium: Stade Mohamed Boumezrag; Attendance: 0 (close doors); Referee: Abderrezzak Arab

22 January 2021 Round 9	MC Oran	1–0	ASO Chlef	Oran
15:00	Mellel 90+2' (pen.)	Soccerway report		Stadium: Ahmed Zabana Stadium; Attendance: 0 (close doors); Referee: Lotfi Bekouassa

26 January 2021 Round 10	ASO Chlef	2–1	Paradou AC	Chlef
15:00	Benzaza 60'; Beldjilali 75'	Soccerway report	Mouali 4'	Stadium: Stade Mohamed Boumezrag; Attendance: 0 (close doors); Referee: Mehdi Abid Charef

30 January 2021 Round 11	Olympique de Médéa	2–1	ASO Chlef	Médéa
14:30	Cheurfaoui 77'; Dadache 90+3'	Soccerway report	Beldjilali 69'	Stadium: Stade Imam Lyes; Attendance: 0 (close doors); Referee: Hamza Bouslimani

20 February 2021 Round 14	ASO Chlef	0–6	JS Saoura	Chlef
15:00		Soccerway report	Lahmeri 14'; Kaidi 37'; Zaidi 45', 57'; Messaoudi 60'; Yahia-Chérif 77'	Stadium: Stade Mohamed Boumezrag; Attendance: 0 (close doors); Referee: Mohamed Boutaraa

27 February 2021 Round 15	ES Sétif	3–0	ASO Chlef	Sétif
15:00	Kendouci 17', 60'; Amoura 66'	Soccerway report		Stadium: Stade 8 Mai 1945; Attendance: 0 (close doors); Referee: Lahlou Benbraham

6 March 2021 Round 16	ASO Chlef	2–3	AS Aïn M'lila	Chlef
15:00	Lakour 82', 89'	Soccerway report	Demane 28'; Elmammeri 32'; Hamia 76'	Stadium: Stade Mohamed Boumezrag; Attendance: 0 (close doors); Referee: Mustapha Ghorbal

13 March 2021 Round 17	USM Alger	3–0	ASO Chlef	Bologhine
15:00	Benchaâ 11'; Belkacemi 14' (pen.), 67'	Soccerway report		Stadium: Omar Hamadi Stadium; Attendance: 0 (close doors); Referee: Abdelali Ibrir

17 March 2021 Round 18	ASO Chlef	1–0	US Biskra	Chlef
15:00	Merili 30'	Soccerway report		Stadium: Stade Mohamed Boumezrag; Attendance: 0 (close doors); Referee: Nabil Boukhalfa

21 March 2021 Round 19	RC Relizane	0–0	ASO Chlef	Tlemcen (Note: RC Relizane played their home match against ASO Chlef at Stade Akid Lotfi, Tlemcen, instead of their regular stadium Stade Tahar Zoughari, Relizane, due to renovation.)
15:00		Soccerway report		Stadium: Stade Akid Lotfi; Attendance: 0 (close doors); Referee: Houssam Benyahia

24 March 2021 Round 12	ASO Chlef	1–3	CR Belouizdad	Chlef
15:00	Benzaza 52'	Soccerway report	Draoui 17'; Nessakh 41'; Belahouel 72'	Stadium: Stade Mohamed Boumezrag; Attendance: 0 (close doors); Referee: Mustapha Bessiri

30 March 2021 Round 13	MC Alger	2–0	ASO Chlef	Algiers
15:00	Frioui 3'; Belkheir 30' (pen.)	Soccerway report		Stadium: Stade du 5 Juillet; Attendance: 0 (close doors); Referee: Abderrezzak Arab

4 May 2021 Round 20	ASO Chlef	0–1	NC Magra	Chlef
22:30		Soccerway report	Bouguèche 1'	Stadium: Stade Mohamed Boumezrag; Attendance: 0 (close doors); Referee: Lahrache

16 May 2021 Round 21	WA Tlemcen	2–3	ASO Chlef	Tlemcen
17:00	Aichi 83'; Messaoudi 63'	Soccerway report	Meharzi 17', 90+2'; Alili 68'	Stadium: Stade Akid Lotfi; Attendance: 0 (close doors); Referee: Ahmed Bouzrar

22 May 2021 Round 22	ASO Chlef	1–1	CS Constantine	Chlef
18:00	Bouguettaya 54'	Soccerway report	Amokrane 73'	Stadium: Stade Mohamed Boumezrag; Attendance: 0 (close doors); Referee: Boubekeur Zouaoui

26 May 2021 Round 23	JS Kabylie	2–1	ASO Chlef	Tizi Ouzou
18:00	Hamroune 26' (pen.); Tizi Bouali 54'	Soccerway report	Benzaza 6'	Stadium: Stade 1er Novembre 1954; Attendance: 0 (close doors); Referee: Mohamed Saïdi

30 May 2021 Round 24	ASO Chlef	1–0	JSM Skikda	Chlef
18:00	Meharzi 72'	Soccerway report		Stadium: Stade Mohamed Boumezrag; Attendance: 0 (close doors); Referee: Amine Sekhraoui

10 June 2021 Round 25	USM Bel Abbès	2–1	ASO Chlef	Sidi Bel Abbès
17:00	Ouertani 41'; Belmokhtar 69' (pen.)	Soccerway report	Bouguettaya 34'	Stadium: Stade 24 Fevrier 1956; Attendance: 0 (close doors); Referee: Lyés Bekouassa

18 June 2021 Round 26	ASO Chlef	1–1	NA Hussein Dey	Chlef
17:45	Bouguettaya 8'	Soccerway report	Sebbah 90+6'	Stadium: Stade Mohamed Boumezrag; Attendance: 0 (close doors); Referee: Mohamed Boutaraa

26 June 2021 Round 27	CA Bordj Bou Arreridj	1–0	ASO Chlef	Bordj Bou Arréridj
17:00	Daouadji 72'	Soccerway report		Stadium: Stade 20 Août 1955; Attendance: 0 (close doors); Referee: Ahmed Bouzrar

1 July 2021 Round 28	ASO Chlef	0–0	MC Oran	Chlef
17:00		Soccerway report		Stadium: Stade Mohamed Boumezrag; Attendance: 0 (close doors); Referee: Hamza Bouslimani

4 July 2021 Round 29	Paradou AC	2–3	ASO Chlef	Dar El Beïda
17:30	Mouali 18'; Bouzok 90+1' (pen.)	Soccerway report	Bengrina 5'; Boulaouidet 23'; Bouguettaya 89'	Stadium: Omar Benrabah Stadium; Attendance: 0 (close doors); Referee: Abdelmoumen Touabti

8 July 2021 Round 30	ASO Chlef	1–0	Olympique de Médéa	Chlef
20:30	Bouguettaya 56'	Soccerway report		Stadium: Stade Mohamed Boumezrag; Attendance: 0 (close doors); Referee: Amine Hansal

13 July 2021 Round 31	CR Belouizdad	2–1	ASO Chlef	Belouizdad
18:00	Belkhir 52'; Bousseliou 73'	Soccerway report	Ouis 60'	Stadium: Stade 20 Août 1955; Attendance: 0 (close doors); Referee: Youcef Gamouh

17 July 2021 Round 32	ASO Chlef	1–1	MC Alger	Chlef
20:30	Bouguettaya 11'	Soccerway report	Lamara 39' (pen.)	Stadium: Stade Mohamed Boumezrag; Attendance: 0 (close doors); Referee: Abdelali Ibrir

23 July 2021 Round 33	JS Saoura	2–2	ASO Chlef	Béchar
18:00	Saâd 67'; Amrane 86'	Soccerway report	Dahmani 80'; Bouguettaya 90+1'	Stadium: Stade 20 Août 1955; Attendance: 0 (close doors); Referee: Lyés Bekouassa

27 July 2021 Round 34	ASO Chlef	1–1	ES Sétif	Chlef
21:00	Ouis 6'	Soccerway report	Merbah 53'	Stadium: Stade Mohamed Boumezrag; Attendance: 0 (close doors); Referee: Ali Nader

9 August 2021 Round 35	AS Ain M'lila	0–0	ASO Chlef	Aïn M'lila
21:00		Soccerway report		Stadium: Touhami Zoubir Khelifi Stadium; Attendance: 0 (close doors); Referee: Lahlou Benbraham

16 August 2021 Round 36	ASO Chlef	1–0	USM Alger	Chlef
21:00	Meddah 43'	Soccerway report		Stadium: Stade Mohamed Boumezrag; Attendance: 0 (close doors); Referee: Farouk Mial

21 August 2021 Round 37	US Biskra	2–0	ASO Chlef	Biskra
21:00	Chibane 29'; Mokhtar 38'	Soccerway report		Stadium: Stade du 18 Février; Attendance: 0 (close doors); Referee: Mehdi Abid Charef

24 August 2021 Round 38	ASO Chlef	2–1	RC Relizane	Chlef
21:00	Bouguettaya 40' (pen.); Bengrina 69'	Soccerway report	Mazari 79'	Stadium: Stade Mohamed Boumezrag; Attendance: 0 (close doors); Referee: Abderrezzak Arab

== Algerian League Cup ==
20 April 2021 Preliminary round	Olympique de Médéa	2–1	ASO Chlef	Médéa
15:30	Kenniche 8'; Elghomari 40'	Report	Dahmani 68'	Stadium: Stade Imam Lyes; Attendance: 0 (close doors); Referee: Mustapha Ghorbal
Note: Lineup for ASO Chlef - Sahnoun, Benmaarouf (Baaziz, 69'), Belhaoua (Fettouhi, 69'), Meharzi, Nehari, Zeghnoun, Benzaza (Dahmani, 46'), Alili, Bengrina, Lakour, Ouis.

== Squad information ==
=== Playing statistics ===
No.	Pos	Nat	Player	Total		Ligue 1		League Cup	
No.	Pos	Nat	Player	Apps	Goals	Apps	Goals	Apps	Goals
Goalkeepers
	GK	(Algeria) ALG	Mohamed Amine Sahnoun	1	0	0	0	1	0
	GK	(Algeria) ALG	Youssouf Benhemada	0	0	0	0	0	0
	GK	(Algeria) ALG	Maamar Nadjib Meddah	0	0	0	0	0	0
Defenders
	DF	(Algeria) ALG	Islam Chahrour	0	0	0	0	0	0
	DF	(Algeria) ALG	Abdellah Meddah	0	0	0	0	0	0
	DF	(Algeria) ALG	Abderrahmane Nehari	1	0	0	0	1	0
	DF	(Algeria) ALG	Houssem Meharzi	1	0	0	0	1	0
	DF	(Algeria) ALG	Farouk Benmaarouf	1	0	0	0	1	0
	DF	(Algeria) ALG	Mohamed Sabri Benbrahim	0	0	0	0	0	0
	DF	(Algeria) ALG	Mohamed Roufid Arab	0	0	0	0	0	0
	DF	(Algeria) ALG	Khalfallah Belhaoua	1	0	0	0	1	0
Midfielders
	MF	(Algeria) ALG	Brahim Benzaza	1	0	0	0	1	0
	MF	(Algeria) ALG	Khathir Baaziz	1	0	0	0	1	0
	MF	(Algeria) ALG	Mohamed Bengrina	1	0	0	0	1	0
	MF	(Algeria) ALG	Kaddour Beldjilali	0	0	0	0	0	0
	MF	(Algeria) ALG	Khalid Dahmani	1	1	0	0	1	1
	MF	(Algeria) ALG	Fawzi Benhamla	0	0	0	0	0	0
	MF	(Algeria) ALG	Mostapha Alili	1	0	0	0	1	0
	MF	(Algeria) ALG	Islam Merili	0	0	0	0	0	0
	MF	(Algeria) ALG	Mustapha Zeghnoun	1	0	0	0	1	0
Forwards
	FW	(Algeria) ALG	Féthi Tahar	0	0	0	0	0	0
	FW	(Algeria) ALG	Nour El Islam Fettouhi	1	0	0	0	1	0
	FW	(Algeria) ALG	Mohamed Boulaouidet	0	0	0	0	0	0
	FW	(Algeria) ALG	Tayeb Lakour	1	0	0	0	1	0
	FW	(Algeria) ALG	Ameur Bouguettaya	0	0	0	0	0	0
	FW	(Algeria) ALG	Mohamed Amine Ouis	1	0	0	0	1	0
	FW	(Algeria) ALG	Sofiane Khedim	0	0	0	0	0	0
Players transferred out during the season

Last updated: 17 November 2019
Source: fr.soccerway.com

=== Goalscorers ===
Includes all competitive matches. The list is sorted alphabetically by surname when total goals are equal.

== Transfers ==
=== In ===
Date	Pos	Player	From club	Transfer fee	Source
2 September 2020	DF	(Algeria) Houssem Meharzi	AS Khroub	Free transfer	
2 September 2020	MF	(Algeria) Abdellah Meddah	US Beni Douala	Free transfer	
21 September 2020	DF	(Algeria) Mohamed Sabri Benbrahim	(Tunisia) US Tataouine	Free transfer	
28 September 2020	DF	(Algeria) Abderrahmane Nehari	OM Arzew	Free transfer	
2 October 2020	MF	(Algeria) Mustapha Zeghnoun	JSM Skikda	Free transfer	
2 October 2020	FW	(Algeria) Ameur Bouguettaya	USM Bel Abbès	Free transfer	
2 October 2020	MF	(Algeria) Khathir Baaziz	MC El Eulma	Free transfer	
7 October 2020	MF	(Algeria) Mohamed Amine Ouis	MC Saïda	Free transfer	
18 October 2020	DF	(Algeria) Islam Chahrour	CS Constantine	Free transfer	

=== Out ===
Date	Pos	Player	To club	Transfer fee	Source
11 August 2020	FW	(Algeria) Said Hadji Habib	JS Kabylie	Free transfer	
30 September 2020	MF	(Algeria) Abdelkader Boussaid	JSM Skikda	Free transfer	
30 September 2020	FW	(Algeria) Abdelkader Kaibou	JSM Skikda	Free transfer	
5 October 2020	FW	(Algeria) Chaker Kaddour Chérif	JS Kabylie	Free transfer	
11 April 2021	FW	(Algeria) Féthi Tahar	MC Alger	Free transfer	
