= Abdelhak Mohamed Rabah =

Algerian footballer (born 1981)

Personal information
- Full name: Abdelhak Mohamed Rabah
- Date of birth: June 21, 1981 (age 45)
- Place of birth: Mostaganem, Algeria
- Position: Defensive midfielder

Senior career*
Years	Team	Apps	(Gls)
2006–2007	ASM Oran	23	(-১)
2007–2008	AS Khroub	12	(1)
2008–2009	CA Bordj Bou Arréridj	-	(-)
2009–2011	ASO Chlef	41	(3)
2011–2013	CA Bordj Bou Arréridj	49	(2)
2013–2014	MC Saida	2	(-)
2014–2015	USMM Hadjout	-	(-)
2015–2018	ES Mostaganem	-	(-)
Total			(6)
- * Club domestic league appearances and goals as of 00:00, 23 June 2024 (UTC)

Abdelhak Mohamed Rabah (born June 21, 1981) was an Algerian football player. He retired at ES Mostaganem on 1 July, 2018 when his contract at the club ended.

== Honours ==
- Won the Algerian Ligue Professionnelle 1 with ASO Chlef in 2011
- Finalist of the Algerian Cup with CA Bordj Bou Arréridj in 2009
