= Mohamed Ghalem =

Algerian footballer (born 1977)

Personal information
- Full name: Mohamed Ghalem
- Date of birth: 17 October 1977 (age 49)
- Place of birth: Algiers, Algeria
- Height: 1.95 m (6 ft 5 in)
- Position: Goalkeeper

Team information
- Current team: ASO Chlef
- Number: 1

Senior career*
Years	Team	Apps	(Gls)
1995–2000	CA Bordj Bou Arréridj	-	(-)
2000–2002	MO Béjaïa	-	(-)
2002–2009	RC Kouba	-	(-)
2009–2010	USM Blida	34	(0)
2010–	ASO Chlef	48	(0)
- * Club domestic league appearances and goals as of 00:00, March 16, 2012 (UTC)

Mohamed Ghalem (born 17 October 1977, Algiers) is an Algerian football player. He currently plays for ASO Chlef in the Algerian Ligue Professionnelle 1.

== Personal ==
Ghalem was born in the Mohamed Belouizdad neighbourhood of Algiers. At a young age, his family moved to the town of Medjana, Bordj Bou Arréridj.

== Honours ==
- ASO Chlef
  - Algerian Ligue Professionnelle 1: 2010–11
