= Mohamed Zaouche =

Algerian footballer (born 1983)

Personal information
- Full name: Mohamed Zaouche
- Date of birth: January 21, 1983 (age 43)
- Place of birth: Chlef, Algeria
- Position: Midfielder

Team information
- Current team: ASO Chlef
- Number: 14

Youth career
- 2002–2003: ASO Chlef

Senior career*
Years	Team	Apps	(Gls)
2003–2004	RCB Oued Rhiou	-	(-)
2004–	ASO Chlef	-	(-)
- * Club domestic league appearances and goals as of 18:11, 25 June 2011 (UTC)

Mohamed Zaouche (born January 21, 1983, in Chlef) is an Algerian football player. He currently plays for ASO Chlef in the Algerian Ligue Professionnelle 1.

== Honours ==
- Won the Algerian Cup once with ASO Chlef in 2005
- Won the Algerian Ligue Professionnelle 1 once with ASO Chlef in 2011
