= Abdelhak Sailaa =

Algerian footballer (born 1996)

Personal information
- Full name: Abdelhak Sailaa
- Date of birth: 26 November 1996 (age 29)
- Place of birth: Rouiba, Algeria
- Height: 1.84 m (6 ft 0 in)
- Position: Centre-back

Youth career
- –2017: CR Belouizdad

Senior career*
Years	Team	Apps	(Gls)
2017–2019	MC Saïda		
2019	MC El Eulma		
2020–2021	MC Alger	3	(0)
2020–2021	→ USM Bel Abbès	17	(0)
2021–2022	ASO Chlef	3	(0)
2022–2024	Al-Sadd		
2024	MC El Bayadh	6	(0)
- * Club domestic league appearances and goals as of 30 December 2024

Abdelhak Sailaa (Arabic: عبد الحق صايلع; born 26 November 1996) is an Algerian footballer.

== Career ==
In 2020, he signed a contract with MC Alger. In 2021, he signed a contract with ASO Chlef. On 19 June 2022, Sailaa joined Al-Sadd. On 14 August 2024, he signed for MC El Bayadh.
