= Yaya Banhoro =

Burkinabé footballer (born 1996)

Personal information
- Date of birth: 1 January 1996 (age 30)
- Place of birth: Ouagadougou, Burkina Faso
- Height: 1.73 m (5 ft 8 in)
- Position: Forward

Youth career
- Majestic

Senior career*
Years	Team	Apps	(Gls)
2013–2014	Majestic		
2015–2017	Londrina	12	(1)
2016	→ Iraty (loan)	13	(4)
2017–2019	Santos	0	(0)
2019	→ Bangu (loan)	10	(2)
2021	Joinville	5	(0)
2021–	ASO Chlef	2	(0)

International career^{‡}
2017–	Burkina Faso	1	(0)
- * Club domestic league appearances and goals as of 20:23, 11 April 2021 (UTC) ‡ National team caps and goals as of 5 September 2017

Yaya Banhoro (born 1 January 1996), known simply as Yaya in Brazil, is a Burkinabé professional footballer who plays as a forward for the Burkina Faso national football team.

== Club career ==
=== Londrina ===
Born in Ouagadougou, Yaya started playing for local side Majestic FC before moving to Brazil with Londrina in 2015.

On 6 March 2016, Yaya made his debut for Londrina, coming on as a second-half substitute for Paulinho Moccelin in a 1–1 Campeonato Paranaense home draw against Atlético Paranaense. On 8 August, after only two further appearances, he was loaned to Iraty until the end of the year.

Yaya scored four goals during his loan spell, and started to feature regularly for Londrina upon returning. He scored his first goal for the club on 16 April 2017, netting his team's only in a 2–1 away loss Atlético Paranaense.

=== Santos ===
On 1 November 2017, after a trial period, Yaya signed for Santos until April 2018, and was initially assigned to the B-team. On 15 January 2019, after a failed trial at Ponte Preta the previous year, he was loaned to Bangu until the end of the 2019 Campeonato Carioca.

== International career ==
Yaya was first called up for Burkina Faso national team in May 2017. He made his full international debut on 2 September 2017, replacing Cyrille Bayala in a 0–0 away draw against Senegal.

== Career statistics ==
=== Club ===
As of 11 April 2021

Appearances and goals by club, season and competition
Club	Season	League			State League		Cup		Continental		Other		Total	
Club	Season	Division	Apps	Goals	Apps	Goals	Apps	Goals	Apps	Goals	Apps	Goals	Apps	Goals
Londrina	2016	Série B	0	0	2	0	1	0	—		—		3	0
Londrina	2017	Série B	0	0	10	1	0	0	—		0	0	10	1
Londrina	Total		0	0	12	1	1	0	—		0	0	13	1
Iraty (loan)	2016	Paranaense Série Bronze	—		13	4	—		—		—		13	4
Bangu	2019	Carioca	—		10	2	—		—		—		10	2
Joinville	2021	Série D	0	0	5	0	—		—		—		5	0
Total			0	0	40	7	1	0	0	0	0	0	41	7

=== International ===
As of 25 January 2017

Appearances and goals by national team and year
National team	Year	Apps	Goals
Burkina Faso	2017	1	0
Total		1	0
