= Karim Meliani =

French footballer (born 1987)

Personal information
- Full name: Mohamed Karim Meliani
- Date of birth: 3 September 1987 (age 39)
- Place of birth: Nanterre, France
- Height: 1.84 m (6 ft 0 in)
- Position: Midfielder

Team information
- Current team: RCF Paris

Youth career
- Red Star

Senior career*
Years	Team	Apps	(Gls)
2004–2005	Red Star	0	(0)
2005–2007	Noisy-le-Sec		
2007–2009	AC Amiens		
2009–2012	Amiens	69	(6)
2012–2013	Red Star	14	(0)
2013–2015	ASO Chlef	50	(1)
2015–	MO Béjaïa	3	(0)
2016–2017	AC Amiens	14	(0)
2019–	RCF Paris	20	(2)
- * Club domestic league appearances and goals as of 1 August 2020

Mohamed Karim Meliani (born 3 September 1987) is a French professional footballer who plays as a midfielder for French lower-league club RCF Paris.

== Biography ==
Meliani plays in the amateur divisions in France and Algeria.

He played in Algeria's top division with ASO Chlef and MO Béjaïa. He played a total of 52 games in the Algerian top flight, scoring one goal. He took part in the 2015 Confederation Cup with Chlef (four games played).
