= Saad Tedjar =

Algerian footballer (born 1986)

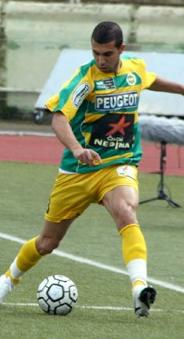
- Tedjar with JS Kabylie in 2010

Personal information
- Date of birth: 14 January 1986 (age 40)
- Place of birth: Béjaïa, Algeria
- Height: 1.83 m (6 ft 0 in)
- Position: Midfielder

Senior career*
Years	Team	Apps	(Gls)
2006–2009	Paradou AC	28	(2)
2009–2010	→ JS Kabylie (loan)	27	(3)
2010–2012	JS Kabylie	41	(5)
2012–2013	USM Alger	16	(1)
2013–2015	ASO Chlef	47	(9)
2015	MO Béjaïa	11	(0)
2015–2016	ASO Chlef		
2016–2017	CABBA		
2019–2020	WA Boufarik		
2020–2021	MS Cherchell		

International career
2011–2013	Algeria	7	(0)
- * Club domestic league appearances and goals as of 06:49, 7 January 2024 (UTC)

Saad Tedjar (Arabic: سعد تججار; born 14 January 1986) is an Algerian professional footballer who plays as a midfielder.

== Club career ==
In 2006, Tedjar signed a five-year contract with Paradou AC.

=== JS Kabylie ===
In June 2009, Tedjar was loaned out by his club to JS Kabylie for one season with a buy option at the end of the loan period, on condition that Paradou AC do not gain promotion.

In his first season with the club, Tedjar scored 3 goals in 23 games as JSK finished third in the league.

On 4 June 2010 JS Kabylie took up the buy option on Tedjar, and the player signed a two-year contract with the club.

On 29 August 2010 he scored a goal against Egypt's Al Ahly in the 2010 CAF Champions League group stage, helping his side become the first team to earn a semi-final spot after drawing 1-1.

== International career ==
On 18 April 2010 Tedjar made his debut for the Algeria A' national team as a substitute in an African Championship of Nations qualifier against Libya.

On 12 August 2011 Tedjar was called up for the first time to the Algerian National Team by Vahid Halilhodžić for a 2012 Africa Cup Nations qualifier against Tanzania.

== Honours ==
- Won the Algerian Cup twice with JS Kabylie in 2011 and USM Alger in 2013
