= 2018–19 CS Constantine season =

CS Constantine
2018–19 season
- Chairman: Tarek Arama
- Head coach: Abdelkader Amrani (until 6 November 2018); Denis Lavagne (from 17 December 2018)
- Stadium: Stade Mohamed Hamlaoui
- Ligue 1: 7th
- Algerian Cup: Semi-finals
- Super Cup: Runners–up
- Champions League: Quarter-finals
- Top goalscorer: League: Ismaïl Belkacemi (8); All: Ismaïl Belkacemi (10)
Home colours	Away colours

In the 2018–19 season, CS Constantine competed in the Ligue 1 for the 23rd season, as well as the Champions League, and the Algerian Cup.

== Mid-season ==
=== Overview ===
Competition	Record								Started round	Final position / round	First match	Last match
Competition	G	W	D	L	GF	GA	GD	Win %	Started round	Final position / round	First match	Last match
Ligue 1	30	10	10	10	30	24	+6	33.33	—N/a	7th	10 August 2018	26 May 2019
Algerian Cup	6	3	2	1	7	5	+2	50.00	Round of 64	Semi-finals	27 December 2018	24 April 2019
Super Cup	1	0	0	1	0	1	−1	0.00	Final	Runners–up	1 November 2018	
Champions League	12	6	2	4	15	12	+3	50.00	Preliminary round	Quarter-finals	27 November 2018	13 April 2019
Total	49	19	14	16	52	42	+10	38.78				

Updated to match played 28 May 2019
Source: Competitions

== League table ==
Pos	Team	Pld	W	D	L	GF	GA	GD	Pts	Qualification or relegation
5	ES Sétif	30	13	6	11	34	24	+10	45	
6	MC Alger	30	11	10	9	35	36	−1	43	Qualification for Arab Club Champions Cup
7	CS Constantine	30	10	10	10	30	24	+6	40	Qualification for Arab Club Champions Cup
8	CR Belouizdad	30	10	11	9	28	27	+1	38 (Note: CR Belouizdad were deducted 3 points.)	Qualification for Confederation Cup (Note: CR Belouizdad are Algerian Cup winners.)
9	CA Bordj Bou Arreridj	30	9	10	11	22	24	−2	37	

Source: DZFoot
Rules for classification: 1) points; 2) head-to-head points; 3) head-to-head goal difference; 4) goal difference; 5) total goals; 6) fairplay ranking; 7) playoff.

=== Results summary ===
Overall								Home						Away					
Pld	W	D	L	GF	GA	GD	Pts	W	D	L	GF	GA	GD	W	D	L	GF	GA	GD
30	10	10	10	30	24	+6	40	7	7	1	19	9	+10	3	3	9	11	15	−4

Last updated: 28 May 2018.
Source: Competitive matches

=== Results by round ===
Round	1	2	3	4	5	6	7	8	9	10	11	12	13	14	15	16	17	18	19	20	21	22	23	24	25	26	27	28	29	30
Ground	H	A	H	A	H	A	H	A	H	A	H	A	H	H	A	A	H	A	H	A	H	A	H	A	H	A	H	A	A	H
Result	D	D	W	L	W	D	W	L	D	L	D	W	D	D	L	W	W	L	W	W	D	L	W	L	D	L	W	L	D	L
Position	7	10	6	10	4	6	3	4	6	7	7	6	7	8	8	7	5	6	4	3	4	7	4	6	7	7	6	7	6	7

Updated to match(es) played on 26 May 2019. Source: Competitive matches
A = Away; H = Home; W = Win; D = Draw; L = Loss

=== Matches ===
Win Draw Loss

10 August 2018 Round 1	CS Constantine	1–1	NA Hussein Dey	Constantine
21:00	Beldjilali 81'	Soccerway report	Khacef 90+3'	Stadium: Stade Mohamed Hamlaoui; Referee: Lahlou Benbraham

17 August 2018 Round 2	CA Bordj Bou Arreridj	0–0	CS Constantine	Bordj Bou Arréridj
21:00		Soccerway report		Stadium: Stade 20 Août 1955; Referee: Mustapha Ghorbal

28 August 2018 Round 3	CS Constantine	1–0	JS Saoura	Constantine
19:00	Belkacemi 9'	Soccerway report		Stadium: Stade Mohamed Hamlaoui; Referee: Mustapha Bessiri

1 September 2018 Round 4	MO Béjaïa	1–0	CS Constantine	Béjaïa
17:45	Dahar 10'	Soccerway report		Stadium: Stade de l'Unité Maghrébine; Referee: Nabil Boukhalfa

10 September 2018 Round 5	CS Constantine	3–0	USM Bel Abbès	Constantine
19:00	Lamri 43', 68'; Abid 58'	Soccerway report		Stadium: Stade Mohamed Hamlaoui; Referee: Lotfi Bekouassa

14 September 2018 Round 6	AS Ain M'lila	0–0	CS Constantine	Batna
17:00		Soccerway report		Stadium: November 1, 1954 Stadium; Referee: Mohamed Saïdi

21 September 2018 Round 7	CS Constantine	2–0	Paradou AC	Constantine
17:00	Belkacemi 60', 77'	Soccerway report		Stadium: Stade Mohamed Hamlaoui; Referee: Abderrezzak Arab

5 October 2018 Round 9	CS Constantine	1–1	CR Belouizdad	Constantine
17:00	Belkacemi 36'	Soccerway report	Djarrar 74'	Stadium: Stade Mohamed Hamlaoui; Referee: Farouk Mial

11 October 2018 Round 10	ES Sétif	2–0	CS Constantine	Sétif
17:45	Rebiai 48', 61'	Soccerway report		Stadium: Stade 8 Mai 1945; Attendance: 0 (close doors); Referee: Mustapha Bessiri

15 October 2018 Round 8	MC Alger	2–1	CS Constantine	Algiers
17:45	Hachoud 15'; Bendebka 88'	Soccerway report	Salhi 26'	Stadium: July 5, 1962 Stadium; Referee: Nabil Boukhalfa

20 October 2018 Round 11	CS Constantine	0–0	Olympique de Médéa	Constantine
17:00		Soccerway report		Stadium: Stade Mohamed Hamlaoui; Referee: Hamza Bouslimani

6 November 2018 Round 13	CS Constantine	0–0	MC Oran	Constantine
17:00		Soccerway report		Stadium: Stade Mohamed Hamlaoui; Referee: Lahlou Benbraham

10 November 2018 Round 14	CS Constantine	3–3	DRB Tadjenanet	Constantine
17:00	Abid 8'; Aichi 19'; Chahrour 83'	Soccerway report	Aribi 11', 89'; Bensaha 18'	Stadium: Stade Mohamed Hamlaoui; Referee: Lyés Bekouassa

15 November 2018 Round 15	USM Alger	2–1	CS Constantine	Bologhine
17:45	Benyahia 69'; Hamia 83' (yellow card) 84'	Soccerway report	Belkacemi 39'	Stadium: Omar Hamadi Stadium; Referee: Farouk Mial

19 November 2018 Round 12	JS Kabylie	0–2	CS Constantine	Tizi Ouzou
17:45		Soccerway report	Beldjilali 22'; Lamri 49'	Stadium: November 1, 1954 Stadium; Referee: Nabil Boukhalfa

4 January 2019 Round 16	NA Hussein Dey	0–1	CS Constantine	Belouizdad
15:00		Soccerway report	Abid 74'	Stadium: Stade 20 Août 1955; Referee: Mustapha Bessiri

15 January 2019 Round 17	CS Constantine	1–0	CA Bordj Bou Arreridj	Constantine
17:45	Bencherifa 58'	Soccerway report		Stadium: Stade Mohamed Hamlaoui; Referee: Ahmed Bouzrar

27 January 2019 Round 19	CS Constantine	1–0	MO Béjaïa	Constantine
17:00	Debbari 20' (o.g.)	Soccerway report		Stadium: Stade Mohamed Hamlaoui; Referee: Mustapha Bessiri

4 February 2019 Round 20	USM Bel Abbès	0–4	CS Constantine	Sidi Bel Abbès
16:00		Soccerway report	Bahamboula 24'; Lamri 45'; Belkacemi 58'; Beldjilali 61'	Stadium: Stade 24 Fevrier 1956; Referee: Lyés Bekouassa

8 February 2019 Round 21	CS Constantine	0–0	AS Ain M'lila	Constantine
17:00		Soccerway report		Stadium: Stade Mohamed Hamlaoui; Referee: Lotfi Bekouassa

12 February 2019 Round 22	Paradou AC	1–0	CS Constantine	Bologhine
17:45	Benayad 25'	Soccerway report		Stadium: Omar Hamadi Stadium; Referee: Mohamed Saïdi

2 April 2019 Round 25	CS Constantine	1–1	ES Sétif	Constantine
17:00	Djabout 64'	Soccerway report	Bakir 80'	Stadium: Stade Mohamed Hamlaoui; Referee: Mustapha Bessiri

21 April 2019 Round 26	Olympique de Médéa	1–0	CS Constantine	Médéa
16:00	Abdelhafid 23'	Soccerway report		Stadium: Stade Imam Lyes de Médéa; Referee: Lotfi Bekouassa

27 April 2019 Round 18	JS Saoura	3–1	CS Constantine	Béchar
18:00	Farhi 66', 85'; Hammar 89'	Soccerway report	Bahamboula 62'	Stadium: Stade 20 Août 1955; Referee: Ahmed Bouzrar

1 May 2019 Round 23	CS Constantine	2–0	MC Alger	Constantine
17:00	Bencherifa 37'; Belkacemi 40'	Soccerway report		Stadium: Stade Mohamed Hamlaoui; Referee: Mohamed Saïdi

6 May 2019 Round 24	CR Belouizdad	2–1	CS Constantine	Belouizdad
16:00	Balegh 12'; Bechou 54'	Soccerway report	Yettou 6'	Stadium: Stade 20 Août 1955; Referee: Nabil Boukhalfa

11 May 2019 Round 27	CS Constantine	2–0	JS Kabylie	Constantine
22:30	Abid 26'; Benayada 44'	Soccerway report		Stadium: Stade Mohamed Hamlaoui; Attendance: 0 (close doors); Referee: Ali Nader

16 May 2019 Round 28	MC Oran	1–0	CS Constantine	Oran
22:30	Guertil 34'	Soccerway report		Stadium: Ahmed Zabana Stadium; Referee: Amine Sekhraoui

21 May 2019 Round 29	DRB Tadjenanet	0–0	CS Constantine	Tadjenanet
22:30		Soccerway report		Stadium: Lahoua Smaïl Stadium; Attendance: 0 (close doors); Referee: Missoum Benabdellah

26 May 2019 Round 30	CS Constantine	1–3	USM Alger	Constantine
22:30	Belkacemi 34'	Soccerway report Live TV: Canal Algérie / Al-Kass Sports	Meziane 32'; Ibara 39'; Meftah 85'	Stadium: Stade Mohamed Hamlaoui; Referee: Mohamed Saïdi

== Algerian Cup ==
27 December 2018 Round of 64	CS Constantine	3–1	RC Bougaa	Constantine
17:00	Belkheir 28'; Belkacemi 65'; Abid 77'		Benzit 55' (pen.)	Stadium: Stade Mohamed Hamlaoui; Referee: Yazid Ibrir

31 December 2018 Round of 32	IB Lakhdaria	0–1	CS Constantine	Lakhdaria
14:00				Stadium: Mansour Khodja Stadium

23 January 2019 Round of 16	MB Rouissat	1–2	CS Constantine	Ghardaïa
15:00	Bouti Sayeh 1'		51' Yettou; 79' Benayada	Stadium: OPOW Stadium; Referee: Merzoug Brahimi

12 March 2019 QF 1st leg	CS Constantine	1–1	MC Oran	Constantine
15:00	Belkacemi 89'	Report	El Moudene 80'	Stadium: Mohamed Hamlaoui Stadium; Referee: Lotfi Bekouassa

28 March 2019 QF 2nd leg	MC Oran	1–1 (a.e.t.) (4–5 p)	CS Constantine	Oran
17:00	Nadji 58'		Zaâlani 68'	Stadium: Ahmed Zabana Stadium; Referee: Said Aouina
	Penalties
	Nadji (penalty scored); Halaïmia (penalty scored); Boudebouda (penalty scored); Mansouri (penalty scored); Aouadj (penalty missed); Mahammedi (penalty missed)		(penalty missed) Abid; (penalty scored) Belkheir; (penalty scored) Lamri; (penalty scored) Benayada; (penalty scored) Djabout; (penalty scored) Gagaa

17 April 2019 SF 1st leg	CS Constantine	1–0	CR Belouizdad	Constantine
17:00	Abid 68'			Stadium: Mohamed Hamlaoui Stadium; Referee: Lahlou Benbraham

24 April 2019 SF 2nd leg	CR Belouizdad	2–0 (a.e.t.)	CS Constantine	Belouizdad
16:00	Adel Djerrar 74'; Rayen Hais Benderrouya 99'			Stadium: Stade 20 Août 1955; Referee: Missoum Benabdellah

== Algerian Super Cup ==
The 2018 Algerian Super Cup is the 11th edition of the Algerian Super Cup, a competition with only one match, organized by the Professional Football League (LFP) and the Algerian Football Federation (FAF) since 2013. The Algerian Ligue Professionnelle 1 champion competes against the winner of the Algerian Cup.

Therefore, CS Constantine, the 2017-2018 champion of Algeria, played against USM Bel Abbès, winner of the 2017–18 Algerian Cup. The rules of the game are: the duration of the game is 90 minutes and in case of a tie, a session of penalties is performed to separate the teams. Three substitutions are allowed for each team.

1 November 2018	CS Constantine	0–1	USM Bel Abbès	Blida
17:00		Report; Live TV: Algérie 3 / Canal Algérie / Al-Kass Sports	Lamara 90+4' (pen.)	Stadium: Mustapha Tchaker Stadium; Referee: Mohamed Saïdi

== Champions League ==
=== Preliminary round ===
27 November 2018 First leg	CS Constantine (Algeria)	0–0	(The Gambia) GAMTEL	Constantine
17:00 UTC+1		Report		Stadium: Stade Mohamed Hamlaoui; Referee: Babacar Sarr (Mauritania)

5 December 2018 Second leg	GAMTEL (The Gambia)	0–1	(Algeria) CS Constantine	Bakau
16:00 UTC+0		Report	Belkacemi 2'	Stadium: Independence Stadium; Referee: Fabricio Duarte (Cape Verde)

=== First round ===
14 December 2018 First leg	CS Constantine (Algeria)	1–0	(Uganda) Vipers	Constantine
19:00 UTC+1	Beldjilali 14'	Report		Stadium: Mohamed Hamlaoui Stadium; Referee: Maguette N'Diaye (Senegal)

22 December 2018 Second leg	Vipers (Uganda)	0–2	(Algeria) CS Constantine	Wakiso Town
16:00 UTC+3		Report	Djabout 64'; Bencherifa 70'	Stadium: St Mary's Stadium; Referee: Amin Mohamed Omar (Egypt)

=== Group stage ===
==== Group C ====
Pos	Team	Pld	W	D	L	GF	GA	GD	Pts	Qualification	TPM	CSC	CA	ISM
1	(Democratic Republic of the Congo) TP Mazembe	6	3	2	1	13	4	+9	11	Quarter-finals	—	2–0	8–0	2–0
2	(Algeria) CS Constantine	6	3	1	2	8	6	+2	10 (Note: Goal difference in all group matches: CS Constantine +2, Club Africain –4.)	Quarter-finals	3–0	—	0–1	3–2
3	(Tunisia) Club Africain	6	3	1	2	5	9	−4	10		0–0	0–1	—	1–0
4	(Egypt) Ismaily (Note: The CAF announced on 23 January 2019 that Ismaily were disqualified for aggressive fans behaviors, including consistently throwing rocks and water bottles on the assistant referee and the away fans, and other incidents at their home match against Club Africain on 18 January 2019. All results of matches played by Ismaily were annulled and not taken into consideration according to the regulations. However, following an appeal by Ismaily, the CAF decided on 10 February 2019 to reinstate Ismaily to the competition.)	6	0	2	4	4	11	−7	2		1–1	1–1	0–3 (awd.) (Note: On 19 February 2019, following the suspension of the match involving Ismaily and Club Africain due to the aggressive behaviors Ismaily fans shown during the match, CAF decided to consider the match forfeited by Ismaily with a result of 3–0 in favour of Club Africain. The match was originally suspended on the 83rd minute with the score 1–2 for Club Africain.)	—

Source: CAF
Notes:

11 January 2019 1	Club Africain (Tunisia)	0–1	(Algeria) CS Constantine	Radès
20:00 UTC+1		Report	Belkheir 89'	Stadium: Stade Olympique de Radès; Referee: Eric Otogo-Castane (Gabon)

19 January 2019 2	CS Constantine (Algeria)	3–0	(Democratic Republic of the Congo) TP Mazembe	Constantine
20:00 UTC+1	Benayada 51'; Zaâlani 65'; Lamri 80'	Report		Stadium: Mohamed Hamlaoui Stadium; Referee: Noureddine El Jaafari (Morocco)

23 February 2019 (Note: The Ismaily v CS Constantine on Matchday 3, originally scheduled on 1 February 2019, 18:00 local time, was re-scheduled to 23 February 2019, 18:00 local time, after the reinstatement of Ismaily.) 3	Ismaily (Egypt)	1–1	(Algeria) CS Constantine	Alexandria
18:00 UTC+2	Shilongo 69'	Report	Hamdy 90+4' (o.g.)	Stadium: Borg El Arab Stadium; Attendance: 0 (Note: The Ismaily v CS Constantine and Ismaily v TP Mazembe matches were played behind closed doors due to crowd trouble during the Ismaily v Club Africain match.); Referee: Bakary Gassama (Gambia)

2 March 2019 (Note: The CS Constantine v Ismaily on Matchday 4, originally scheduled on 12 February 2019, 17:00 local time, was re-scheduled to 2 March 2019, 17:00 local time, after the reinstatement of Ismaily.) 4	CS Constantine (Algeria)	3–2	(Egypt) Ismaily	Constantine
17:00 UTC+1	Zaâlani 45+2'; Yettou 67'; Bahamboula 81'	Report	Hamdy 13'; Shilongo 50'	Stadium: Mohamed Hamlaoui Stadium; Referee: El Fadil Mohamed (Sudan)

8 March 2019 5	CS Constantine (Algeria)	0–1	(Tunisia) Club Africain	Constantine
17:00 UTC+1		Report	Compaoré 45'	Stadium: Mohamed Hamlaoui Stadium; Referee: Rédouane Jiyed (Morocco)

16 March 2019 6	TP Mazembe (Democratic Republic of the Congo)	2–0	(Algeria) CS Constantine	Lubumbashi
15:00 UTC+2	Muleka 14' (pen.); Mputu 67'	Report		Stadium: Stade TP Mazembe; Referee: Sidi Alioum (Cameroon)

== Knockout stage ==
=== Quarter-finals ===
6 April 2019 First leg	CS Constantine (Algeria)	2–3	(Tunisia) Espérance de Tunis	Constantine
20:00 UTC+1	Djabout 49'; Yettou 71'	Report	Belaïli 6' (pen.); Coulibaly 47'; Yacoubi 74'	Stadium: Stade Mohamed Hamlaoui; Referee: Gehad Grisha (Egypt)

13 April 2019 Second leg	Espérance de Tunis (Tunisia)	3–1	(Algeria) CS Constantine	Radès
20:00 UTC+1	Bguir 23', 27'; Kom 86'	Report	Bahamboula 62'	Stadium: Stade Olympique de Radès; Referee: Noureddine El Jaafari (Morocco)

== Squad information ==
=== Playing statistics ===
No.	Pos	Nat	Player	Total		Ligue 1		Algerian Cup		Super Cup		Champions League	
No.	Pos	Nat	Player	Apps	Goals	Apps	Goals	Apps	Goals	Apps	Goals	Apps	Goals
Goalkeepers
1	GK	(Algeria) ALG	Houssam Limane	14	0	11	0	2	0	0	0	1	0
16	GK	(Algeria) ALG	Chamseddine Rahmani	33	0	18	0	3	0	1	0	11	0
30	GK	(Algeria) ALG	Mohamed Lotfi Anis Osmani	4	0	2	0	1	0	0	0	1	0
Defenders
3	DF	(Algeria) ALG	Houcine Benayada	41	3	24	1	5	1	1	0	11	1
14	DF	(Algeria) ALG	Sofiane Khadir	17	0	13	0	3	0	0	0	1	0
19	DF	(Algeria) ALG	Said Arroussi	21	0	14	0	2	0	0	0	5	0
20	DF	(Algeria) ALG	Islam Chahrour	36	1	20	1	4	0	1	0	11	0
23	DF	(Algeria) ALG	Nasreddine Zaâlani	38	3	21	0	4	1	1	0	12	2
28	DF	(Algeria) ALG	Yacine Salhi	32	1	18	1	3	0	1	0	10	0
	DF	(Algeria) ALG	Karm Benkouider	8	0	6	0	2	0	0	0	0	0
	DF	(Algeria) ALG	Amine Boucheriha	14	0	11	0	3	0	0	0	0	0
Midfielders
7	MF	(Algeria) ALG	Mohamed El Amine Belmokhtar	16	0	13	0	0	0	1	0	2	0
8	MF	(Algeria) ALG	Foued Hadded	35	0	20	0	4	0	1	0	10	0
10	MF	(Algeria) ALG	Kaddour Beldjilali	34	3	21	2	2	0	1	0	10	1
17	MF	(Algeria) ALG	Mohamed Walid Bencherifa	36	3	22	2	5	0	1	0	8	1
22	MF	(Algeria) ALG	Nassim Yettou	23	4	10	1	5	1	0	0	8	2
24	MF	(Republic of the Congo) CGO	Dylan Bahamboula	22	4	12	2	4	0	0	0	6	2
Forwards
9	FW	(Algeria) ALG	Lamine Abid	30	6	19	4	4	2	0	0	7	0
11	FW	(Algeria) ALG	Adil Djabout	31	4	19	2	4	0	0	0	8	2
13	FW	(Algeria) ALG	Sid Ali Lamri	44	5	27	4	6	0	1	0	10	1
15	FW	(Algeria) ALG	Mounir Aichi	20	1	12	1	2	0	1	0	5	0
18	FW	(Algeria) ALG	Abdenour Belkheir	30	2	16	0	6	1	1	0	7	1
25	FW	(Algeria) ALG	Ismaïl Belkacemi	44	12	28	8	5	2	1	0	10	2
26	FW	(Algeria) ALG	Nassim Zitouni	10	0	9	0	0	0	1	0	0	0
29	FW	(Algeria) ALG	Ahmed Gagaa	18	0	11	0	4	0	0	0	3	0
27	FW	(Cameroon) CMR	Arouna Dang Bissene	9	0	5	0	1	0	0	0	3	0
Players transferred out during the season
22	MF	(Burkina Faso) BFA	Abdoul Rahim Salam Kagambega	9	0	9	0	0	0	0	0	0	0
6	MF	(Burkina Faso) BFA	Ousmane Sylla	11	0	8	0	0	0	0	0	3	0

Last updated: 11 June 2018
Source: fr.soccerway.com

== Squad list ==
As of August 10, 2018. Note: Flags indicate national team as defined under FIFA eligibility rules; some limited exceptions apply. Players may hold more than one non-FIFA nationality.

No.	Pos.	Nation	Player
1	GK	ALG	Houssam Limane
3	DF	ALG	Houcine Benayada
6	MF	BFA	Ousmane Sylla
7	MF	ALG	Mohamed El Amine Belmokhtar
8	MF	ALG	Foued Hadded
9	FW	ALG	Lamine Abid
10	MF	ALG	Kaddour Beldjilali
11	FW	ALG	Adil Djabout
13	FW	ALG	Sid Ali Lamri
14	DF	ALG	Sofiane Khadir
15	FW	ALG	Mounir Aichi
16	GK	ALG	Chamseddine Rahmani

No.	Pos.	Nation	Player
17	MF	ALG	Mohamed Walid Bencherifa
18	FW	ALG	Abdenour Belkheir
19	DF	ALG	Said Arroussi
20	DF	ALG	Islam Chahrour
22	MF	BFA	Abdoul Rahim Salam Kagambega
23	DF	ALG	Nasreddine Zaâlani
24	FW	ALG	Ismaïl Belkacemi
26	FW	ALG	Nassim Zitouni
28	DF	ALG	Yacine Salhi
29	FW	ALG	Ahmed Gagaa
30	GK	ALG	Mohamed Lotfi Anis Osmani

== Transfers ==
=== In ===
Date	Pos	Player	From club	Transfer fee	Source
4 June 2018	DF	(Algeria) islam Chahrour	Paradou AC	Free transfer	
5 June 2018	AM / CM	(Algeria) Kaddour Beldjilali	(Algeria) USM Alger	Free transfer (Released)	
6 June 2018	MF	(Algeria) Yacine Salhi	MO Béjaïa	Free transfer	
12 June 2018	FW	(Algeria) Mohamed Amine Belmokhtar	DRB Tadjenanet	Free transfer	
14 June 2018	FW	(Algeria) Adil Djabout	JS Kabylie	Free transfer (Released)	
7 August 2018	FW	(Algeria) Nassim Zitouni	(Bulgaria) Dunav Ruse	Free transfer (Released)	
9 January 2019	FW	(Republic of the Congo) Dylan Bahamboula	(Romania) Astra Giurgiu	Free transfer	
12 January 2019	FW	(Cameroon) Arouna Dang Bissene	(Angola) Kabuscorp	Free transfer	

=== Out ===
Date	Pos	Player	To club	Transfer fee	Source
12 June 2018	MF	(Algeria) Merouane Dahar	MO Béjaïa	Free transfer	
4 July 2018	MF	(Algeria) Toufik Zerara	CA Bordj Bou Arreridj	Free transfer	
9 July 2018	FW	(Algeria) Karim Rachedi	USM El Harrach	Free transfer	
11 July 2018	MF	(Algeria) Yacine Bezzaz	MC El Eulma	Free transfer	
9 August 2018	FW	(Mali) Moctar Cissé	NA Hussein Dey	Free transfer	
9 August 2018	MF	(Algeria) Abdelaziz Kebbal	CR Belouizdad	Free transfer	
22 August 2018	MF	(Algeria) El Hedi Belameiri	(Cyprus) Alki Oroklini	Free transfer	
2 January 2019	MF	(Burkina Faso) Ousmane Sylla	AS Ain M'lila	Loan	
2 January 2019	MF	(Burkina Faso) Abdoul Rahim Salam Kagambega	Unattached	Free transfer (Released)	
2 January 2019	FW	(Algeria) Nassim Zitouni	Unattached	Free transfer (Released)	
