= 2017–18 CS Constantine season =

CS Constantine
2017–18 season
- Chairman: Tarek Arama
- Head coach: Abdelkader Amrani
- Stadium: Stade Mohamed Hamlaoui
- Ligue 1: Winners
- Algerian Cup: Round of 32
- Top goalscorer: League: Lamine Abid (16); All: Lamine Abid (16)
Home colours

In the 2017–18 season, CS Constantine competed in the Ligue 1 for the 22nd season, as well as the Algerian Cup.

== Summary season ==
In the new season the CS Constantine laid off ten players, including The goalkeeper in the last four seasons Cédric Si Mohamed, and defender Arslane Mazari, Midfield former international Mourad Meghni due to repeated injuries, Abdelhak Sameur and attackers Mohamed Amine Aoudia and Ivorian Manucho Which ended his loan period, After that coach Abdelkader Amrani renewed his contract with the CS Constantine for two seasons. after he led the team for six months last season. and then put a list of the names of the players who must be brought, the first international goalkeeper Chamseddine Rahmani from MO Béjaïa then the striker Lamine Abid from NA Hussein Dey for two seasons the first foreign player this season contracted with him is the international Burkinabé Ousmane Sylla for three seasons, five days after that the team contracted with three players and they are Said Arroussi, Sid Ali Lamri from ES Sétif and Sofiane Khadir from MO Béjaïa. Then the last player to sign with him was Mali international Moctar Cissé from Albanian club KF Tirana.

Like every season the team prepared for this season in Tunisia and in the city of Hammam Bourguiba during the period from July 20 to 31, a preparation camp ahead of the new season of Ligue 1 which will begin on August 25, this pre-season internship, the second after the Constantine reunion which ran from July 15 to 19. the first friendly match against US Monastir ended in favor of Les Sanafir with a single goal. this second cycle of pre-season preparation will be followed by another internship in Gammarth between 6 and 18 August which will be devoted to the physical aspect of the technico-tactical part with friendly matches in the program. After the end of both internships in Tunisia and returning to Algeria in preparation for the first round in Ligue 1, CSC aspires to play the first roles this season.

The first match was against NA Hussein Dey at home and won 3–1 two of them for El Hedi Belameiri after that in the first away game was defeated against the DRB Tadjenanet 2–1 starting from the third round the team looked great results and the victory against USM Bel-Abbès with a single goal from Moctar Cissé then at the top of the fifth round against MC Alger, they scored a valuable win from the new player Lamine Abid, two weeks after that they managed to achieve the first victory outside the home against US Biskra double Abid to take the lead with 13 points, four days later and in the east Derby against ES Sétif and after he was late with a goal until the 88 minutes managed to achieve a historic victory after scoring two goals in two minutes. then CS Constantine followed the positive results and maintain his lead in the 11th round against USM Alger, the CSC achieved surprise by winning two goals after they were late by goal in the first half after the game coach Amrani said that winning the championship is not the goal of the team and that there are still 19 games. but in round 13 and against JS Kabylie they won a valuable win and it is the second win away from home, two goals from Abid who reached the tenth goal of the season, and then declared Amrani that winning the championship became a goal after it became the elves from the big teams such as ES Sétif and USM Alger. the start of this season is the best since his ascension in 2011–12 season and is looking for his second title after the first season 1996–97.

=== Pre-season ===
25 July 2017 Friendly match	US Monastir (Tunisia)	0 – 1	(Algeria) CS Constantine	Hammam Bourguiba, Tunisia
00:00 CET (UTC+1)		Report	88' Belameiri	Stadium: ?

== Competitions ==
=== Overview ===
Competition	Record								Started round	Final position / round	First match	Last match
Competition	G	W	D	L	GF	GA	GD	Win %	Started round	Final position / round	First match	Last match
Ligue 1	30	16	9	5	36	26	+10	53.33	—N/a	Winners	26 August 2017	18 May 2018
Algerian Cup	2	1	0	1	2	2	+0	50.00	Round of 64	Round of 32	29 December 2017	16 January 2018
Total	32	17	9	6	38	28	+10	53.13				

Updated to match played 19 May 2018
Source: Competitions

== League table ==
Pos	Team	Pld	W	D	L	GF	GA	GD	Pts	Qualification or relegation
1	CS Constantine (C)	30	16	9	5	36	26	+10	57	Qualification for the 2018–19 Champions League
2	JS Saoura	30	16	6	8	38	27	+11	54	Qualification for the 2018–19 Champions League
3	NA Hussein Dey	30	11	16	3	36	24	+12	49	Qualification for the 2018–19 Confederation Cup
4	MC Oran	30	12	9	9	40	37	+3	45	
5	MC Alger	30	12	8	10	41	32	+9	44	Qualification for 2018–19 Arab Club Champions Cup

Updated to match(es) played on 19 May 2018. Source: DZFoot
Rules for classification: 1) points; 2) head-to-head points; 3) head-to-head goal difference; 4) goal difference; 5) total goals; 6) fairplay ranking; 7) playoff.
(C) Champions

=== Results summary ===
Overall								Home						Away					
Pld	W	D	L	GF	GA	GD	Pts	W	D	L	GF	GA	GD	W	D	L	GF	GA	GD
30	16	9	5	36	26	+10	57	11	4	0	22	9	+13	5	5	5	14	17	−3

Last updated: 30 January 2016.
Source: Competitive matches

=== Results by round ===
Round	1	2	3	4	5	6	7	8	9	10	11	12	13	14	15	16	17	18	19	20	21	22	23	24	25	26	27	28	29	30
Ground	H	A	H	A	H	A	H	A	H	H	A	H	A	H	A	A	H	A	H	A	H	A	H	A	A	H	A	H	A	H
Result	W	L	W	D	W	W	W	D	D	W	W	W	W	D	L	D	W	W	D	L	W	L	W	D	L	W	D	W	W	D
Position	2	9	4	4	4	1	1	2	2	2	1	1	1	1	1	1	1	1	1	1	1	1	1	1	1	1	1	1	1	1

Source: Competitive matches
A = Away; H = Home; W = Win; D = Draw; L = Loss

=== Matches ===
Win Draw Loss

25 August 2017 Round 1	CS Constantine	3–1	NA Hussein Dey	Constantine
19:00	Belameiri 52', 68'; Zerara 58'	Soccerway report Live TV: None	67' Boulaouidet	Stadium: Stade Mohamed Hamlaoui; Referee: Mustapha Bessiri

8 September 2017 Round 2	DRB Tadjenanet	2–1	CS Constantine	Tadjenanet
17:00	Attouche 31'; Belmokhtar 34'	Soccerway report Live TV: EPTV Terrestre / TV Tamazight 4	41' Sylla	Stadium: Lahoua Smaïl Stadium; Referee: Mustapha Ghorbal

15 September 2017 Round 3	CS Constantine	1–0	USM Bel-Abbès	Constantine
17:45	Cissé 43' (pen.)	Soccerway report Live TV: TV Tamazight 4		Stadium: Stade Mohamed Hamlaoui; Referee: Merzak Halalchi

23 September 2017 Round 4	USM El Harrach	1–1	CS Constantine	Belouizdad
17:00	Mellel 14' (pen.)	Soccerway report Live TV: None	26' Cissé	Stadium: Stade 20 Août 1955; Referee: Said Aouina

29 September 2017 Round 5	CS Constantine	1–0	MC Alger	Constantine
17:00	Abid 71'	Soccerway report Live TV: Canal Algérie		Stadium: Stade Mohamed Hamlaoui; Referee: Mohamed Saïdi

13 October 2017 Round 6	US Biskra	1–2	CS Constantine	Biskra
16:00	Bagili 86'	Soccerway report Live TV: None	36', 59' Abid	Stadium: El Alia Sports Complex; Referee: Mustapha Bessiri

17 October 2017 Round 7	CS Constantine	2–1	ES Sétif	Constantine
17:45	Abid 88'; Arroussi 90'	Soccerway report Live TV: Algérie 3	52' (o.g.) Benayada	Stadium: Stade Mohamed Hamlaoui; Referee: Merzak Halalchi

21 October 2017 Round 8	CR Belouizdad	0–0	CS Constantine	Belouizdad
16:00		Soccerway report Live TV: Algérie 3		Stadium: Stade 20 Août 1955; Referee: Mustapha Ghorbal

27 October 2017 Round 9	CS Constantine	1–1	Olympique de Médéa	Constantine
16:00	Abid 51'	Soccerway report Live TV: None	4' Boucherit	Stadium: Stade Mohamed Hamlaoui; Referee: Amine Sekhraoui

4 November 2017 Round 10	CS Constantine	4–2	JS Saoura	Constantine
16:00	Abid 15', 21'; Madani 23' (o.g.); Lamri 29'	Soccerway report Live TV: Algérie 3	52' Saâd; 76' Yahia-Chérif	Stadium: Stade Mohamed Hamlaoui; Referee: Lotfi Bekouassa

11 November 2017 Round 11	USM Alger	1–2	CS Constantine	Bologhine
17:00	Yaya 11'	Soccerway report Live TV: Algérie 3	57' Abid; 74' Dahar	Stadium: Omar Hamadi Stadium; Referee: Mustapha Ghorbal

17 November 2017 Round 12	CS Constantine	1–0	MC Oran	Constantine
17:00	Abid 58'	Soccerway report Live TV: Canal Algérie		Stadium: Stade Mohamed Hamlaoui; Referee: Lyés Bekouassa

1 December 2017 Round 13	JS Kabylie	1–2	CS Constantine	Tizi Ouzou
16:00	Saadou 28'	Soccerway report Live TV: EPTV Terrestre / TV Tamazight 4	67', 84' Abid	Stadium: November 1, 1954 Stadium; Referee: Nabil Boukhalfa

8 December 2017 Round 14	CS Constantine	1–1	USM Blida	Constantine
17:00	Rebih 27'	Soccerway report Live TV: Canal Algérie	73' Ouamri	Stadium: Stade Mohamed Hamlaoui; Referee: Lahlou Benbraham

16 December 2017 Round 15	Paradou AC	2–0	CS Constantine	Bologhine
17:00	Cheraitia 3'; Naidji 83'	Soccerway report Live TV: Canal Algérie		Stadium: Omar Hamadi Stadium; Referee: Mohamed Saïdi

6 January 2018 Round 16	NA Hussein Dey	1–1	CS Constantine	Belouizdad
16:00	Yousfi 75'	Soccerway report Live TV: Algérie 3	3' Cissé	Stadium: Stade 20 Août 1955; Referee: Nabil Boukhalfa

20 January 2018 Round 17	CS Constantine	2–1	DRB Tadjenanet	Constantine
16:00	Abid 20'; Zerara 88'	Soccerway report Live TV: EPTV Terrestre	72' (pen.) Dousse	Stadium: Stade Mohamed Hamlaoui; Referee: Abderrazek Hallalchi

26 January 2018 Round 18	USM Bel-Abbès	1–2	CS Constantine	Sidi Bel Abbès
16:00	Bouguelmouna 86'	Soccerway report Live TV: EPTV Terrestre / Canal Algérie	13' Arroussi; 56' Abid	Stadium: Stade 24 Fevrier 1956; Referee: Lotfi Bekouassa

9 February 2018 Round 19	CS Constantine	0–0	USM El Harrach	Constantine
17:45		Soccerway report Live TV: Algérie 3 / Canal Algérie		Stadium: Stade Mohamed Hamlaoui; Referee: Said Aouina

16 February 2018 Round 20	MC Alger	3–0	CS Constantine	Algiers
17:00	Souibaâh 6'; Bendebka 28'; Amada 79' (pen.)	Soccerway report Live TV: Algérie 3 / Canal Algérie / beIN Sports		Stadium: July 5, 1962 Stadium; Referee: Lahlou Benbraham

23 February 2018 Round 21	CS Constantine	1–0	US Biskra	Constantine
17:00	Abid 5'	Soccerway report Live TV: None		Stadium: Stade Mohamed Hamlaoui; Attendance: 0 (close doors); Referee: Farouk Mial

2 March 2018 Round 22	ES Sétif	1–0	CS Constantine	Sétif
18:00	Haddouche 33'	Soccerway report Live TV: Algérie 3		Stadium: Stade 8 Mai 1945; Referee: Ahmed Bouzrar

10 March 2018 Round 23	CS Constantine	1–0	CR Belouizdad	Constantine
16:00	Zerara 6'	Soccerway report Live TV: None		Stadium: Stade Mohamed Hamlaoui; Referee: Nabil Boukhalfa

31 March 2018 Round 24	Olympique de Médéa	0–0	CS Constantine	Médéa
16:00		Soccerway report Live TV: None		Stadium: Stade Imam Lyes de Médéa; Referee: Lahlou Benbraham

6 April 2018 Round 25	JS Saoura	1–0	CS Constantine	Béchar
16:00	Bourdim 71' (pen.)	Soccerway report Live TV: EPTV Terrestre / Canal Algérie		Stadium: Stade 20 Août 1955; Referee: Merzoug Brahimi

20 April 2018 Round 26	CS Constantine	2–1	USM Alger	Constantine
16:00	Cherifi 53' (o.g.); Belameiri 90+4'	Soccerway report Live TV: Algérie 3	51' Darfalou	Stadium: Stade Mohamed Hamlaoui; Referee: Ahmed Bouzrar

24 April 2018 Round 27	MC Oran	1–1	CS Constantine	Aïn Témouchent (Note: MC Oran play away from home and behind closed doors because of the violence in a meeting in the Ligue Professionnelle 1 against CR Belouizdad.)
16:00	Tiaïba 87'	Soccerway report Live TV: None	17' (pen.) Abid	Stadium: Omar Oucief Stadium; Attendance: 0 (close doors); Referee: Farouk Mial

4 May 2018 Round 28	CS Constantine	2–1	JS Kabylie	Constantine
16:00	Lamri 39'; Abid 65'	Soccerway report Live TV: Algérie 3 / TV Tamazight 4	41' Yettou	Stadium: Stade Mohamed Hamlaoui; Referee: Merzak Halalchi

12 May 2018 Round 29	USM Blida	1–2	CS Constantine	Blida
16:00	Aissa El Bey 32'	Soccerway report Live TV: None	56', 90' (pen.) Lamri	Stadium: Brakni Brothers Stadium; Referee: Missoum Benabdellah

18 May 2018 Round 30	CS Constantine	0–0	Paradou AC	Constantine
22:30		Soccerway report Live TV: Al-Kass Sports		Stadium: Stade Mohamed Hamlaoui; Referee: Boubekeur Zouaoui

== Algerian Cup ==
29 December 2017 Round of 64	CS Constantine	2–1	NA Hussein Dey	Constantine
16:00	Belkheir 79' (pen.); Zerara 85' (pen.)	Report; Live TV: Canal Algérie / TV Tamazight 4	9' Khiat	Stadium: Stade Mohamed Hamlaoui; Referee: Mustapha Ghorbal

16 January 2018 Round of 32	USM Alger	1–0	CS Constantine	Bologhine
16:00	Sayoud 60'	Report; Live TV: EPTV Terrestre / Canal Algérie		Stadium: Omar Hamadi Stadium; Referee: Farouk Mial

== Squad information ==
=== Playing statistics ===
No.	Pos	Nat	Player	Total		Ligue 1		Algerian Cup	
No.	Pos	Nat	Player	Apps	Goals	Apps	Goals	Apps	Goals
Goalkeepers
1	GK	(Algeria) ALG	Houssam Limane	7	0	7	0	0	0
16	GK	(Algeria) ALG	Chamseddine Rahmani	23	0	23	0	0	0
Defenders
19	DF	(Algeria) ALG	Said Arroussi	24	2	24	2	0	0
3	DF	(Algeria) ALG	Houcine Benayada	29	0	29	0	0	0
17	DF	(Algeria) ALG	Mohamed Walid Bencherifa	26	0	26	0	0	0
14	DF	(Algeria) ALG	Sofiane Khadir	18	0	18	0	0	0
23	DF	(Algeria) ALG	Nasreddine Zaâlani	30	1	30	1	0	0
Midfielders
7	MF	(Algeria) ALG	El Hedi Belameiri	18	3	18	3	0	0
10	MF	(Algeria) ALG	Yacine Bezzaz	21	0	21	0	0	0
25	MF	(Algeria) ALG	Abdelaziz Kebbal	10	0	10	0	0	0
13	MF	(Algeria) ALG	Sid Ali Lamri	29	4	29	4	0	0
6	MF	(Burkina Faso) BFA	Ousmane Jr Sylla	24	0	24	0	0	0
22	MF	(Algeria) ALG	Toufik Zerara	28	2	28	2	0	0
15	MF	(Algeria) ALG	Mounir Aichi	7	0	7	0	0	0
29	MF	(Algeria) ALG	Ahmed Gagaâ	5	0	5	0	0	0
Forwards
9	FW	(Algeria) ALG	Lamine Abid	27	16	27	16	0	0
18	FW	(Algeria) ALG	Abdenour Belkheir	26	0	26	0	0	0
11	FW	(Mali) MLI	Moctar Cissé	23	4	23	4	0	0
26	FW	(Algeria) ALG	Merouane Dahar	16	1	16	1	0	0
28	FW	(Algeria) ALG	Aboubaker Rebih	18	1	18	1	0	0
21	FW	(Algeria) ALG	Karim Rachedi	2	0	2	0	0	0
45	FW	(Algeria) ALG	Adem Redjem	1	0	1	0	0	0
Players transferred out during the season
29	DF	(Algeria) ALG	Hamid Bahri	3	0	3	0	0	0
	FW	(Algeria) ALG	Youcef Zerguine	2	0	2	0	0	0

Last updated: 19 May 2018
Source: fr.soccerway.com

== Squad list ==
As of August 25, 2017. Note: Flags indicate national team as defined under FIFA eligibility rules; some limited exceptions apply. Players may hold more than one non-FIFA nationality.

No.	Pos.	Nation	Player
1	GK	ALG	Houssam Limane
3	DF	ALG	Houcine Benayada
6	MF	BFA	Ousmane Jr Sylla
7	MF	ALG	El Hedi Belameiri
8	MF	ALG	Mohamed Taib
9	FW	ALG	Lamine Abid
10	MF	ALG	Yacine Bezzaz (captain)
11	FW	MLI	Moctar Cissé
13	FW	ALG	Sid Ali Lamri
14	DF	ALG	Sofiane Khadir
15	DF	ALG	Sofyane Cherfa
16	GK	ALG	Chamseddine Rahmani

No.	Pos.	Nation	Player
17	MF	ALG	Mohamed Walid Bencherifa
18	FW	ALG	Abdenour Belkheir
19	DF	ALG	Said Arroussi
22	MF	ALG	Toufik Zerara
23	DF	ALG	Nasreddine Zaâlani
25	MF	ALG	Abdelaziz Kebbal
26	FW	ALG	Merouane Dahar
28	MF	ALG	Aboubaker Rebih
29	DF	ALG	Hamid Bahri
30	GK	ALG	Mohamed Lotfi Anis Osmani
-	FW	ALG	Youcef Zerguine
-	MF	ALG	Cherif Kebaili

== Transfers ==
=== In ===
Date	Pos	Player	From club	Transfer fee	Source
28 June 2017	GK	(Algeria) Chamseddine Rahmani	MO Béjaïa	Free transfer	
2 July 2017	FW	(Algeria) Lamine Abid	NA Hussein Dey	Free transfer	
12 July 2017	DF	(Burkina Faso) Ousmane Sylla	(Burkina Faso) Rail Club du Kadiogo	Free transfer	
17 July 2017	DF	(Algeria) Said Arroussi	ES Sétif	Free transfer	
17 July 2017	MF	(Algeria) Sid Ali Lamri	ES Sétif	Free transfer	
17 July 2017	DF	(Algeria) Sofiane Khadir	MO Béjaïa	Free transfer	
26 July 2017	FW	(Mali) Moctar Cissé	(Albania) KF Tirana	Free transfer	
7 January 2018	MF	(Algeria) Ahmed Gagaâ	Paradou AC	Loan for 18 months	

=== Out ===
Date	Pos	Player	To club	Transfer fee	Source
30 June 2017	DF	(Algeria) Arslane Mazari	USM El Harrach	End of contract	
30 June 2017	MF	(Algeria) Mourad Meghni	Retired	—N/a	
30 June 2017	FW	(Algeria) Mohamed Amine Aoudia	Unattached	End of contract	
30 June 2017	FW	(Ivory Coast) Manucho	USM Alger	Return from loan	
5 July 2017	GK	(Algeria) Cédric Si Mohamed	US Biskra	Free transfer	
28 July 2017	MF	(Algeria) Abdelhak Sameur	CR Belouizdad	Free transfer	
