= 2019–20 CS Constantine season =

CS Constantine
2019–20 season
- Owner: ENTP
- Chairman: Adlane Boukhedenna (from 1 July 2019) (from 18 September 2019)
- Head coach: Denis Lavagne (until 24 December 2019); Karim Khouda (from 30 December 2019)
- Stadium: Stade Mohamed Hamlaoui
- Ligue 1: 5th
- Algerian Cup: Round of 16
- Club Championship: First round
- Top goalscorer: League: Lamine Abid (10 goals); All: Lamine Abid (10 goals)
Home colours	Away colours	Third colours

In the 2019–20 season, CS Constantine competed in the Ligue 1 for the 24th season, as well as the Arab Club Champions Cup, and the Algerian Cup. On March 15, 2020, the Ligue de Football Professionnel (LFP) decided to halt the season due to the COVID-19 pandemic in Algeria. On July 29, 2020, the LFP declared that season is over and CR Belouizdad to be the champion, the promotion of four teams from the League 2, and scraping the relegation for the current season.

== Mid-season ==
18 January 2020 Friendly	CS Sfaxien (Tunisia)	2–0	(Algeria) CS Constantine	Sfax, Tunisia
14:00	Mathlouthi 60'; Sokari 69'	Report		Stadium: Stade Taïeb Mhiri
Note: Lineup for CS Constantine - Osmani, Benayada, Boudebouda (Boucheriha 29’), Zaâlani, Chahrour, Haddade (Lamri 46’), Yettou, Belmessaoud, Amokrane (Abid 46’), Chibane (Orfi 65’), Belkacemi

== Competitions ==
=== Overview ===
Competition	Record								Started round	Final position / round	First match	Last match
Competition	G	W	D	L	GF	GA	GD	Win %	Started round	Final position / round	First match	Last match
Ligue 1	22	9	7	6	32	23	+9	40.91	—N/a	5th	15 August 2019	15 March 2020
Algerian Cup	3	2	0	1	7	4	+3	66.67	Round of 64	Round of 16	28 December 2019	13 February 2020
Club Champions Cup	2	1	0	1	3	3	+0	50.00	First round		27 August 2019	17 September 2019
Total	27	12	7	8	42	30	+12	44.44				

Updated to match played 3 June 2019
Source: Competitions

== League table ==
Pos	Team	Pld	W	D	L	GF	GA	GD	Pts	PPG	Qualification or relegation
3	ES Sétif	22	11	4	7	34	19	+15	37	1.68	Qualification for Confederation Cup
4	JS Kabylie	22	10	6	6	27	18	+9	36	1.64	Qualification for Confederation Cup
5	CS Constantine	22	9	7	6	32	23	+9	34	1.55	
6	USM Alger	21	9	5	7	25	22	+3	32 (Note: USM Alger were deducted 3 points due to their withdrawal in their game against MC Alger. The decision has been appealed to the Court of Arbitration for Sport. On August 28, 2020, after postponing several times the final decision was made without appeal, which is to return the three points and repeat the match.)	1.52	
7	JS Saoura	22	9	6	7	19	18	+1	33	1.50	

Updated to match(es) played on 15 March 2020. Source: dzfoot.com
Rules for classification: 1) points; 2) head-to-head points; 3) head-to-head goal difference; 4) goal difference; 5) total goals; 6) fairplay ranking; 7) playoff.

=== Results summary ===
Overall								Home						Away					
Pld	W	D	L	GF	GA	GD	Pts	W	D	L	GF	GA	GD	W	D	L	GF	GA	GD
22	9	7	6	32	23	+9	34	5	5	1	19	11	+8	4	2	5	13	12	+1

Last updated: 22 April 2018.
Source: Competitive matches

=== Results by round ===
Round	1	2	3	4	5	6	7	8	9	10	11	12	13	14	15	16	17	18	19	20	21	22	23	24	25	26	27	28	29	30
Ground	A	H	A	H	A	H	A	H	A	H	A	H	A	A	H	H	A	H	A	H	A	H	A	H	A	H	A	H	H	A
Result	L	D	L	D	W	W	L	W	D	W	L	W	W	D	L	D	W	D	W	D	L	W	C	C	C	C	C	C	C	C
Position	14	14	14	14	12	6	11	7	7	7	8	7	3	4	5	7	4	5	5	5	5	5	5	5	5	5	5	5	5	5

Updated to match(es) played on 22 April 2019. Source: Competitive matches
A = Away; H = Home; W = Win; D = Draw; L = Loss

=== Matches ===
Win Draw Loss

15 August 2019 Round 1	JS Saoura	1–0	CS Constantine	Béchar
20:00	Yahia-Chérif 50'	Soccerway report		Stadium: Stade 20 Août 1955; Referee: Nabil Boukhalfa

19 August 2019 Round 2	CS Constantine	0–0	USM Alger	Constantine
21:00		Soccerway report		Stadium: Stade Mohamed Hamlaoui; Referee: Mohamed Saïdi

31 August 2019 Round 3	MC Oran	1–0	CS Constantine	Oran
20:30	Mansouri 51' (pen.)	Soccerway report		Stadium: Ahmed Zabana Stadium; Referee: Ahmed Bouzrar

12 September 2019 Round 4	CS Constantine	2–2	CA Bordj Bou Arreridj	Constantine
17:45	Abid 25'; Boudebouda 86'	Soccerway report	Benayad 23'; Djahnit 79'	Stadium: Stade Mohamed Hamlaoui; Referee: Mustapha Bessiri

24 September 2019 Round 5	NC Magra	1–2	CS Constantine	Sétif
16:00	Maâziz 36'	Soccerway report	Boudebouda 14'; Amokrane 73'	Stadium: Stade 8 Mai 1945; Attendance: 0 (close doors); Referee: Mustapha Ghorbal

28 September 2019 Round 6	CS Constantine	1–0	NA Hussein Dey	Constantine
17:45	Abid 80'	Soccerway report		Stadium: Stade Mohamed Hamlaoui; Referee: Said Aouina

5 October 2019 Round 7	US Biskra	2–1	CS Constantine	Biskra
19:00	Dakhia 42' (pen.); Cissé 82'	Soccerway report	Djabout 61'	Stadium: Stade du 18 Février; Referee: Abderrezzak Arab

23 October 2019 Round 8	CS Constantine	3–1	JS Kabylie	Constantine
18:45	Lamri 48'; Zaâlani 57'; Boudebouda 74'	Soccerway report	Bensayah 73'	Stadium: Stade Mohamed Hamlaoui; Referee: Mohamed Saïdi

30 October 2019 Round 9	ASO Chlef	1–1	CS Constantine	Chlef
18:00	Benkablia 90+2'	Soccerway report	Abid 81'	Stadium: Stade Mohamed Boumezrag; Referee: Amine Sekhraoui

9 November 2019 Round 10	CS Constantine	1–0	CR Belouizdad	Constantine
17:00	Benayada 37'	Soccerway report		Stadium: Stade Mohamed Hamlaoui; Referee: Mustapha Bessiri

23 November 2019 Round 11	USM Bel Abbès	2–1	CS Constantine	Sidi Bel Abbès
15:00	Aichi 71'; Belhocini 78'	Soccerway report	Abid 15'	Stadium: Stade 24 Fevrier 1956; Referee: Lyés Bekouassa

30 November 2019 Round 12	CS Constantine	3–1	ES Sétif	Constantine
18:45	Abid 37' (pen.), 58'; Amokrane 48'	Soccerway report	Belaïd 56'	Stadium: Stade Mohamed Hamlaoui; Referee: Mustapha Ghorbal

16 December 2019 Round 14	AS Ain M'lila	0–0	CS Constantine	Aïn M'lila
15:00		Soccerway report		Stadium: Touhami Zoubir Khelifi Stadium; Referee: Abderrezzak Arab

21 December 2019 Round 15	CS Constantine	2–3	MC Alger	Constantine
17:45	Abid 5'; Balegh 73'	Soccerway report	Nekkache 33'; Frioui 57' (pen.), 77' (pen.)	Stadium: Stade Mohamed Hamlaoui; Referee: Nabil Boukhalfa

23 January 2020 Round 13	Paradou AC	1–2	CS Constantine	Bologhine
17:00	Bouzok 27' (pen.)	Soccerway report	Abid 65'; Amokrane 90+4'	Stadium: Omar Hamadi Stadium; Referee: Mohamed Bouteraa

1 February 2020 Round 16	CS Constantine	2–2	JS Saoura	Constantine
16:00	Belkacemi 56', 82'	Soccerway report	Yahia-Chérif 9', 24'	Stadium: Stade Mohamed Hamlaoui; Attendance: 0 (close doors); Referee: Said Aouina

8 February 2020 Round 17	USM Alger	1–3	CS Constantine	Bologhine
16:00	Mahious 85' (pen.)	Soccerway report	Belkacemi 49', 90'; Alharaish 90+1'	Stadium: Omar Hamadi Stadium; Attendance: 0 (close doors); Referee: Mustapha Ghorbal

17 February 2020 Round 18	CS Constantine	1–1	MC Oran	Constantine
17:00	Amokrane 55'	Soccerway report	Benhamou 4'	Stadium: Stade Mohamed Hamlaoui; Referee: Malek Ait Ameur

22 February 2020 Round 19	CA Bordj Bou Arreridj	1–3	CS Constantine	Bordj Bou Arréridj
17:45	Gagaa 90'	Soccerway report	Zaâlani 42'; Belkacemi 65'; Abid 69' (pen.)	Stadium: August 20, 1955 Stadium; Referee: Ahmed Bouzrar

29 February 2020 Round 20	CS Constantine	1–1	NC Magra	Constantine
17:00	Yettou 77'	Soccerway report	Haroun 32' (pen.)	Stadium: Stade Mohamed Hamlaoui; Referee: Mohamed Boutaraa

7 March 2020 Round 21	NA Hussein Dey	1–0	CS Constantine	Belouizdad
15:00	Azzi 45'	Soccerway report		Stadium: Stade 20 Août 1955; Attendance: 0 (close doors); Referee: Amine Hansal

15 March 2020 Round 22	CS Constantine	3–0	US Biskra	Constantine
16:00	Yettou 38'; Abid 52'; Amokrane 75'	Soccerway report		Stadium: Ramadan Ben-Abdelmalek Stadium; Attendance: 0 (close doors); Referee: Mustapha Bessiri
Note: due to coronavirus outbreak, Ministry of Health, Population and Hospital Reform decided to be all matches played behind closed doors.

Round 23	JS Kabylie	Cancelled	CS Constantine	Tizi Ouzou
				Stadium: Stade 1er Novembre 1954

Round 24	CS Constantine	Cancelled	ASO Chlef	Constantine
				Stadium: Stade Mohamed Hamlaoui

Round 25	CR Belouizdad	Cancelled	CS Constantine	Belouizdad
				Stadium: Stade 20 Août 1955

Round 26	CS Constantine	Cancelled	USM Bel Abbès	Constantine
				Stadium: Stade Mohamed Hamlaoui

Round 27	ES Sétif	Cancelled	CS Constantine	Sétif
				Stadium: Stade 8 Mai 1945

Round 28	CS Constantine	Cancelled	Paradou AC	Constantine
				Stadium: Stade Mohamed Hamlaoui

Round 29	CS Constantine	Cancelled	AS Aïn M'lila	Constantine
				Stadium: Stade Mohamed Hamlaoui

Round 30	MC Alger	Cancelled	CS Constantine	Algiers
				Stadium: July 5, 1962 Stadium

== Algerian Cup ==
28 December 2019 Round of 64	CS Constantine	4–1	NC Magra	Constantine
17:30	Benayada 18'; Lamri 45+1'; Boucheriha 51'; Amokrane 83'	Report	Demane 38'	Stadium: Stade Mohamed Hamlaoui; Referee: Mohamed Saïdi
Note: Lineup for CS Constantine - Osmani, Benayada, Salhi, Traoré, Yettou, Boucheriha, Lamri, Belmessaoud, Chibane (Amokrane 57’), Belkacemi (Mhazem ?’), Aouadj (Balegh 65’)

4 January 2020 Round of 32	CS Constantine	2–1	JS Saoura	Constantine
16:00	Benayada 41', 77'	Report	Messaoudi 20' (pen.)	Stadium: Stade Mohamed Hamlaoui; Referee: Lahlou Benbraham
Note: Lineup for CS Constantine - Osmani, Benayada, Salhi (Boucheriha 2’), Boudebouda, Zaâlani, Yettou, Lamri, Belmessaoud, Belkacemi, Aouadj (Amokrane 65’), Abid

13 February 2020 Round of 16	ES Sétif	2–1	CS Constantine	Sétif
18:45	Touré 47'; Boussouf 83'	Report	Benayada 40'	Stadium: Stade 8 Mai 1945; Referee: Lyés Bekouassa
Note: Lineup for CS Constantine - Rahmani, Zaâlani, Benayada, Chahrour, Haddade, Abid, Belkacemi, Salhi (Amokrane 86’), Aouadj, Belmessaoud (Alharaish 70’), Yettou (Orfi 88’)

== Club Championship Cup ==
=== First round ===
27 August 2019 First leg	CS Constantine (Algeria)	3–1	(Bahrain) Al-Muharraq	Constantine
20:30 UTC+1	Djabout 39'; Amokrane 85'; Belkacemi 90+4'	Report	Abdullatif 51'	Stadium: Stade Mohamed Hamlaoui; Referee: Noureddine El Jaafari (Morocco)
Note: Lineup for CS Constantine - Limane - Benayada, Zaalani, Chahrour, Traoré - Lamri, Yattou, Balegh (Amokrane, 58') - Athmani (Belkacemi, 58'), Abid, Djabout (Aouedj, 75')

17 September 2019 Second leg	Al-Muharraq (Bahrain)	2–0	(Algeria) CS Constantine	Arad
18:00 UTC+3	Tiago 45+5'; Augusto 80'	Report		Stadium: Al Muharraq Stadium; Referee: Ahmed Yacoub (Jordan)
Note: Lineup for CS Constantine - Meziane - Benayada, Zaalani, Chahrour, Boudebouda - Lamri, Yattou, Salhi - Belkacemi (Balegh 87'), Abid, Djabout (Aouadj 88')

== Squad information ==
=== Playing statistics ===
No.	Pos	Nat	Player	Total		Ligue 1		Algerian Cup		Club Championship	
No.	Pos	Nat	Player	Apps	Goals	Apps	Goals	Apps	Goals	Apps	Goals
Goalkeepers
1	GK	(Algeria) ALG	Houssam Limane	13	0	12	0	0	0	1	0
16	GK	(Algeria) ALG	Lyes Meziane	4	0	3	0	0	0	1	0
30	GK	(Algeria) ALG	Mohamed Lotfi Anis Osmani	4	0	2	0	2	0	0	0
	GK	(Algeria) ALG	Chamseddine Rahmani	7	0	6	0	1	0	0	0
Defenders
3	DF	(Algeria) ALG	Houcine Benayada	24	5	19	1	3	4	2	0
5	DF	(Algeria) ALG	Aymen Boucheriha	15	1	13	0	2	1	0	0
17	DF	(Algeria) ALG	Zineddine Benyahia	3	0	3	0	0	0	0	0
19	DF	(Algeria) ALG	Islam Chahrour	24	0	21	0	1	0	2	0
20	DF	(Algeria) ALG	Brahim Boudebouda	13	3	11	3	1	0	1	0
23	DF	(Algeria) ALG	Nasreddine Zaâlani	22	2	18	2	2	0	2	0
28	DF	(Algeria) ALG	Yacine Salhi	13	0	9	0	3	0	1	0
Midfielders
6	MF	(Algeria) ALG	Foued Hadded	22	0	21	0	1	0	0	0
8	MF	(Algeria) ALG	Sid Ahmed Aouadj	15	0	10	0	3	0	2	0
13	MF	(Algeria) ALG	Sid Ali Lamri	19	2	15	1	2	1	2	0
14	MF	(Algeria) ALG	Kamel Belmessaoud	13	0	10	0	3	0	0	0
18	MF	(Algeria) ALG	Mohamed Yacine Athmani	1	0	0	0	0	0	1	0
22	MF	(Algeria) ALG	Nassim Yettou	25	3	20	3	3	0	2	0
27	MF	(Algeria) ALG	Abou Sofiane Balegh	13	1	10	1	1	0	2	0
	MF	(Libya) LBA	Abdallah Orfi	4	0	3	0	1	0	0	0
Forwards
7	FW	(Algeria) ALG	Abdelhakim Amokrane	25	6	21	4	3	1	1	1
9	FW	(Algeria) ALG	Lamine Abid	24	10	20	10	2	0	2	0
10	FW	(Algeria) ALG	Ismaïl Belkacemi	25	7	20	6	3	0	2	1
21	FW	(Algeria) ALG	Youcef Islam Herida	0	0	0	0	0	0	0	0
22	FW	(Algeria) ALG	Youcef Chibane	13	0	12	0	1	0	0	0
26	FW	(Algeria) ALG	Nassim Zitouni	0	0	0	0	0	0	0	0
	FW	(Libya) LBA	Zakaria Alharaish	5	1	4	1	1	0	0	0
Players transferred out during the season
25	DF	(Mali) MLI	Mahamadou Traoré	6	0	4	0	1	0	1	0
11	FW	(Algeria) ALG	Adil Djabout	14	1	12	0	0	0	2	1
24	FW	(Republic of the Congo) CGO	Dylan Bahamboula	1	0	1	0	0	0	0	0

Last updated: 11 June 2018
Source: fr.soccerway.com

=== Goalscorers ===
Includes all competitive matches. The list is sorted alphabetically by surname when total goals are equal.

No.	Nat.	Player	Pos.	L 1	AC	CC 4	TOTAL
9	(Algeria)	Lamine Abid	FW	10	0	0	10
10	(Algeria)	Ismaïl Belkacemi	FW	6	0	1	7
7	(Algeria)	Abdelhakim Amokrane	FW	4	1	1	6
3	(Algeria)	Houcine Benayada	DF	1	4	0	5
20	(Algeria)	Brahim Boudebouda	DF	3	0	0	3
22	(Algeria)	Nassim Yettou	MF	3	0	0	3
23	(Algeria)	Nasreddine Zaâlani	DF	2	0	0	2
13	(Algeria)	Sid Ali Lamri	MF	1	1	0	2
	(Libya)	Zakaria Alharaish	FW	1	0	0	1
11	(Algeria)	Adil Djabout	FW	0	0	1	1
27	(Algeria)	Abou Sofiane Balegh	MF	1	0	0	1
5	(Algeria)	Aymen Boucheriha	DF	0	1	0	1
Own Goals				0	0	0	0
Totals				32	7	3	42

== Squad list ==
As of 15 August 2019. Note: Flags indicate national team as defined under FIFA eligibility rules; some limited exceptions apply. Players may hold more than one non-FIFA nationality.

No.	Pos.	Nation	Player
1	GK	ALG	Houssam Limane
3	DF	ALG	Houcine Benayada
4	DF	ALG	Nasreddine Zaâlani
5	DF	ALG	Aymen Boucheriha
6	MF	ALG	Foued Hadded
7	FW	ALG	Abdelhakim Amokrane
8	MF	ALG	Sid Ahmed Aouadj
9	FW	ALG	Lamine Abid
10	FW	ALG	Ismail Belkacemi
11	FW	ALG	Adil Djabout
13	MF	ALG	Sid Ali Lamri (captain)
14	MF	ALG	Kamel Belmessaoud
15	DF	ALG	Amir Bourekeb
16	GK	ALG	Mohamed Lotfi Anis Osmani

No.	Pos.	Nation	Player
17	DF	ALG	Zineddine Benyahia
18	MF	ALG	Mohamed Yacine Athmani
19	DF	ALG	Islam Chahrour
20	DF	ALG	Brahim Boudebouda
21	FW	ALG	Youcef Islam Herida
22	FW	ALG	Youcef Chibane
23	MF	ALG	Nassim Yettou
24	FW	CGO	Dylan Bahamboula
25	DF	MLI	Mahamadou Traoré
26	MF	ALG	Abderrahim Dehamchi
27	MF	ALG	Abou Sofiane Balegh
28	DF	ALG	Yacine Salhi
30	GK	ALG	Lyes Meziane

== Transfers ==
=== In ===
Date	Pos	Player	From club	Transfer fee	Source
21 June 2019	FW	(Algeria) Abdelhakim Amokrane	MO Béjaïa	Free transfer	
2 July 2019	DF	(Algeria) Ayache Ziouache	NC Magra	Free transfer	
3 July 2019	MF	(Algeria) Kamel Belmessaoud	JSM Béjaïa	Free transfer	
4 July 2019	DF	(Algeria) Zineddine Benyahia	AS Ain M'lila	Free transfer	
4 July 2019	FW	(Algeria) Walid Athmani	CA Bordj Bou Arreridj	Free transfer	
7 July 2019	GK	(Algeria) Lyes Meziane	CR Belouizdad	Free transfer (Released)	
10 July 2019	MF	(Algeria) Youcef Islam Herida	MO Béjaïa	Free transfer	
10 July 2019	FW	(Algeria) Abou Sofiane Balegh	CR Belouizdad	Free transfer	
10 July 2019	MF	(Algeria) Sid Ahmed Aouadj	MC Oran	Free transfer	
23 July 2019	FW	(Algeria) Youcef Chibane	(Saudi Arabia) Al-Qaisumah	Free transfer	
5 August 2019	DF	(Algeria) Brahim Boudebouda	MC Oran	Free transfer	
4 January 2020	GK	(Algeria) Chamseddine Rahmani	(Saudi Arabia) Damac	Free transfer	
17 January 2020	FW	(Libya) Zakaria Alharaish	(Morocco) Ittihad Tanger	Loan for one year	
17 January 2020	MF	(Libya) Abdallah Orfi	(Libya) Al Ahli SC	Loan for six months	

=== Out ===
Date	Pos	Player	To club	Transfer fee	Source
28 May 2019	GK	(Algeria) Chamseddine Rahmani	(Saudi Arabia) Damac	Free transfer	
24 June 2019	FW	(Algeria) Mohamed El Amine Belmokhtar	CA Bordj Bou Arreridj	Free transfer	
24 June 2019	FW	(Algeria) Ahmed Gagaa	CA Bordj Bou Arreridj	Free transfer	
27 June 2019	MF	(Algeria) Kaddour Beldjilali	JS Saoura	Free transfer	
27 June 2019	MF	(Algeria) Mohamed Walid Bencherifa	JS Kabylie	Free transfer	
2 July 2019	FW	(Algeria) Abdenour Belkheir	MC Alger	Free transfer	
9 July 2019	DF	(Algeria) Kheireddine Arroussi	CA Bordj Bou Arreridj	Free transfer	
23 July 2019	FW	(Algeria) Mounir Aichi	USM Bel Abbès	Free transfer	
3 October 2019	FW	(Republic of the Congo) Dylan Bahamboula	(Bulgaria) Tsarsko Selo	Free transfer (Released)	
15 January 2020	FW	(Algeria) Adil Djabout	US Biskra	Free transfer (Released)	
