= 2019–20 CA Bordj Bou Arreridj season =

Algerian football season halted due to pandemic

CA Bordj Bou Arreridj
2019–20 season
- Chairman: Anis Benhamadi
- Head coach: Franck Dumas (from 26 June 2019) (until 12 January 2020); Moez Bouakaz (from 15 January 2020) (until 26 February 2020); Billel Dziri (from 2 March 2020)
- Stadium: Stade 20 Août 1955
- Ligue 1: 13th
- Algerian Cup: Cancelled
- Top goalscorer: League: Arroussi; Djahnit (3 goals); All: Arroussi; Djahnit (4 goals)
Home colours	Away colours

In the 2019–20 season, CA Bordj Bou Arreridj competed in the Ligue 1 for the 15th season, as well as the Algerian Cup. On March 15, 2020, the Ligue de Football Professionnel (LFP) decided to halt the season due to the COVID-19 pandemic in Algeria. On July 29, 2020, the LFP declared that season is over and CR Belouizdad to be the champion, the promotion of four teams from the League 2, and scraping the relegation for the current season.

== Squad list ==
Players and squad numbers last updated on 15 November 2019.
Note: Flags indicate national team as has been defined under FIFA eligibility rules. Players may hold more than one non-FIFA nationality.

No.	Nat.	Position	Name	Date of Birth (Age)	Signed from
Goalkeepers
1	(Algeria)	GK	Faouzi Chaouchi	5 December 1984 (aged 35)	(Algeria) MC Alger
16	(Algeria)	GK	Cédric Si Mohamed	9 January 1985 (aged 34)	(Algeria) CR Belouizdad
30	(Algeria)	GK	Zakaria Bouhalfaya	11 August 1997 (aged 22)	(Algeria) NA Hussein Dey
Defenders
5	(Algeria)	CB	Said Arroussi	7 April 1990 (aged 29)	(Algeria) CS Constantine
6	(Algeria)		Houd Rahmani	8 March 1998 (aged 21)	(Algeria) Youth system
12	(Algeria)	RB	Meziane Zeroual	26 April 1994 (aged 25)	(Algeria) CR Belouizdad
13	(Algeria)	LB	Farès Aggoun	7 May 1990 (aged 29)	(Algeria) RC Relizane
15	(Algeria)	CB	Mohamed Hammouche	21 April 1995 (aged 24)	(Saudi Arabia) Al-Qaisumah
17	(Algeria)	CB	Mohamed Amrane	27 January 1994 (aged 25)	(Algeria) CA Batna
20	(Algeria)	RB	Oussama Guettal	14 May 1997 (aged 22)	(Algeria) USM Blida
23	(Algeria)	CB	Abdelghani Khiat	30 January 1989 (aged 30)	(Algeria) ES Sétif
28	(Algeria)	CB	Touhami Sebie	3 May 1988 (aged 31)	(Algeria) JS Kabylie
11	(Algeria)	LB	Houari Baouche	24 December 1995 (aged 24)	(Algeria) Olympique de Médéa
Midfielders
14	(Ivory Coast)	DM	Isla Daoudi Diomande	28 April 1998 (aged 21)	(Algeria) ES Sétif
18	(Algeria)	CM	Aikel Gadacha	29 March 1993 (aged 26)	(Cyprus) Alki Oroklini
	(Algeria)	RW	Abdellah Daouadji	9 July 1995 (aged 24)	(Algeria) JS Saoura
25	(Algeria)	AM	El Hedi Belameiri	24 April 1991 (aged 28)	(Cyprus) Alki Oroklini
26	(Algeria)	RW	Amine Aissa El Bey	19 February 1995 (aged 24)	(Algeria) USM Blida
19	(Algeria)	DM	Ahmed Gagaa	15 January 1994 (aged 25)	(Algeria) CS Constantine
24	(Algeria)	DM	Toufik Zerara	3 February 1986 (aged 33)	(Algeria) CS Constantine
Forwards
7	(Algeria)	LW	Mehdi Droueche	20 May 1995 (aged 24)	(Algeria) Paradou AC
8	(Algeria)		Mourad Benayad	25 September 1990 (aged 29)	(Algeria) USM Bel Abbès
9	(Algeria)		Youcef Djahnit	11 January 1997 (aged 22)	(Algeria) Youth system
10	(Algeria)	RW	Mohamed El Amine Belmokhtar	16 April 1995 (aged 24)	(Algeria) CS Constantine
21	(Algeria)	AM	Nour El Islam Melikchi	23 July 1996 (aged 23)	(Algeria) Paradou AC
29	(Algeria)		Tawfiq Elghomari	26 May 1993 (aged 26)	(Algeria) Olympique de Médéa
22	(Sudan)		Mohamed Abderrahmane Al Ghorbal	10 July 1993 (aged 26)	(Sudan) Al-Merrikh
41	(Algeria)	RW	Sofiane Fouad Lachahab	12 July 1999 (aged 20)	(Algeria) Youth system
29	(Ivory Coast)		Ghislain Guessan	15 September 1992 (aged 27)	(Romania) Concordia Chiajna
47	(Algeria)		Noufel Lalaoui	25 March 2000 (aged 19)	(Algeria) Youth system
	(Algeria)		Laïd Saïdi	26 April 2000 (aged 19)	(Algeria) Youth system

== Competitions ==
=== Overview ===
Competition	Record								Started round	Final position / round	First match	Last match
Competition	G	W	D	L	GF	GA	GD	Win %	Started round	Final position / round	First match	Last match
Ligue 1	22	6	7	9	22	29	−7	27.27	—N/a	13th	15 August 2019	15 March 2020
Algerian Cup	4	3	0	1	8	3	+5	75.00	Round of 64	Quarter-finals	28 December 2019	10 March 2020
Total	26	9	7	10	30	32	−2	34.62				

Updated to match played 3 June 2019
Source: Competitions

== League table ==
Pos	Team	Pld	W	D	L	GF	GA	GD	Pts	PPG
11	USM Bel Abbès	21	8	2	11	22	31	−9	26	1.24
12	ASO Chlef	21	6	7	8	15	17	−2	25	1.19
13	CA Bordj Bou Arreridj	22	6	7	9	22	29	−7	25	1.14
14	US Biskra	22	6	3	13	17	33	−16	21	0.95
15	NA Hussein Dey	22	4	7	11	14	27	−13	19 (Note: Head-to-head points: Magra 3, Hussein Day 0)	0.86

Updated to match(es) played on 15 March 2020. Source: dzfoot.com
Rules for classification: 1) points; 2) head-to-head points; 3) head-to-head goal difference; 4) goal difference; 5) total goals; 6) fairplay ranking; 7) playoff.

=== Results summary ===
Overall								Home						Away					
Pld	W	D	L	GF	GA	GD	Pts	W	D	L	GF	GA	GD	W	D	L	GF	GA	GD
26	6	7	13	22	29	−7	25	5	3	3	16	11	+5	1	4	10	6	18	−12

Last updated: 15 March 2020.
Source: Competitive matches

=== Results by round ===
Round	1	2	3	4	5	6	7	8	9	10	11	12	13	14	15	16	17	18	19	20	21	22	23	24	25	26	27	28	29	30
Ground	H	A	H	A	H	A	H	A	H	H	A	H	A	H	A	A	H	A	H	A	H	A	H	A	A	H	A	H	A	H
Result	D	W	W	D	D	L	L	L	L	W	D	W	D	D	D	L	W	L	L	L	W	L	C	C	C	C	C	C	C	C
Position																							13	13	13	13	13	13	13	13

Updated to match(es) played on 22 April 2019. Source: Competitive matches
A = Away; H = Home; W = Win; D = Draw; L = Loss

=== Matches ===
Win Draw Loss

15 August 2019 Round 1	CA Bordj Bou Arreridj	1–1	CR Belouizdad	Béjaïa (Note: CA Bordj Bou Arreridj played their home match against CR Belouizdad at Stade de l'Unité Maghrébine, Béjaïa, instead of their regular stadium August 20, 1955 Stadium, Bordj Bou Arréridj, due to renovation.)
20:30	Droueche 85'	Soccerway report	Selmi 18'	Stadium: Stade de l'Unité Maghrébine; Referee: Abderrezzak Arab

24 August 2019 Round 2	USM Bel Abbès	1–3	CA Bordj Bou Arreridj	Sidi Bel Abbès
21:00	Belhocini 35' (pen.)	Soccerway report	Arroussi 47'; Abbas 58' (o.g.); Zerara 77'	Stadium: Stade 24 Fevrier 1956; Referee: Lyés Bekouassa

31 August 2019 Round 3	CA Bordj Bou Arreridj	1–0	ES Sétif	Bordj Bou Arréridj
20:30	Guessan 78'	Soccerway report		Stadium: August 20, 1955 Stadium; Referee: Redouane Necib

12 September 2019 Round 4	CS Constantine	2–2	CA Bordj Bou Arreridj	Constantine
17:45	Abid 25'; Boudebouda 86'	Soccerway report	Benayad 23'; Djahnit 79'	Stadium: Stade Mohamed Hamlaoui; Referee: Mustapha Bessiri

24 September 2019 Round 5	CA Bordj Bou Arreridj	2–2	AS Aïn M'lila	Bordj Bou Arréridj
18:45	Droueche 53'; Arroussi 62'	Soccerway report	Tiaiba 15', 35'	Stadium: August 20, 1955 Stadium; Referee: Mehdi Abid Charef

6 October 2019 Round 7	CA Bordj Bou Arreridj	1–2	JS Saoura	Bordj Bou Arréridj
17:00	Benayad 2'	Soccerway report	Boubekeur 4'; Messaoudi 72'	Stadium: August 20, 1955 Stadium; Referee: Nabil Boukhalfa

23 October 2019 Round 8	USM Alger	3–0	CA Bordj Bou Arreridj	Bologhine
17:00	Meftah 82' (pen.); Benchaâ 88'; Benkhelifa 90+1'	Soccerway report		Stadium: Omar Hamadi Stadium; Referee: Farouk Mial

30 October 2019 Round 9	CA Bordj Bou Arreridj	1–2	MC Oran	Bordj Bou Arréridj
18:45	Droueche 41' (pen.)	Soccerway report	Mellal 82'; Nadji 90+1'	Stadium: August 20, 1955 Stadium; Referee: Hamza Bouslimani

9 November 2019 Round 10	CA Bordj Bou Arreridj	2–0	Paradou AC	Bordj Bou Arréridj
18:00	Diomande 36'; Arroussi 47'	Soccerway report		Stadium: August 20, 1955 Stadium; Referee: Abderrezzak Arab

17 November 2019 Round 6	MC Alger	1–0	CA Bordj Bou Arreridj	Bologhine
18:45	Derrardja 14'	Soccerway report		Stadium: Omar Hamadi Stadium; Referee: Mohamed Saïdi

23 November 2019 Round 11	NC Magra	1–1	CA Bordj Bou Arreridj	Sétif
16:00	Abdelhafid 14'	Soccerway report	Guessan 78'	Stadium: Stade 8 Mai 1945; Referee: Hamza Boucetta

30 November 2019 Round 12	CA Bordj Bou Arreridj	1–0	NA Hussein Dey	Bordj Bou Arréridj
15:00	Djahnit 84'	Soccerway report		Stadium: August 20, 1955 Stadium; Referee: Mustapha Bessiri

7 December 2019 Round 13	US Biskra	0–0	CA Bordj Bou Arreridj	Biskra
16:00		Soccerway report		Stadium: Stade du 18 Février; Attendance: 0 (close doors); Referee: Redouane Necib

16 December 2019 Round 14	CA Bordj Bou Arreridj	1–1	JS Kabylie	Bordj Bou Arréridj
15:00	Belameiri 46'	Soccerway report	Tafni 20'	Stadium: August 20, 1955 Stadium; Attendance: 0 (close doors); Referee: Lahlou Benbraham

21 December 2019 Round 15	ASO Chlef	0–0	CA Bordj Bou Arreridj	Chlef
17:00		Soccerway report		Stadium: Stade Mohamed Boumezrag; Referee: Youcef Gamouh

3 February 2020 Round 16	CR Belouizdad	4–0	CA Bordj Bou Arreridj	Belouizdad
16:00	Djerrar 5'; Hammouche 15' (o.g.); Belahouel 38'; Sayoud 90+1'	Soccerway report		Stadium: Stade 20 Août 1955; Referee: Youcef Gamouh

8 February 2020 Round 17	CA Bordj Bou Arreridj	2–0	USM Bel Abbès	Bordj Bou Arréridj
15:00	Yousif 53'; Belameiri 90+2'	Soccerway report		Stadium: August 20, 1955 Stadium; Referee: Lotfi Bekouassa

17 February 2020 Round 18	ES Sétif	3–0	CA Bordj Bou Arreridj	Sétif
16:00	Saïdi 9'; Draoui 44'; Amoura 90+2'	Soccerway report		Stadium: Stade 8 Mai 1945; Referee: Mehdi Abid Charef

22 February 2020 Round 19	CA Bordj Bou Arreridj	1–3	CS Constantine	Bordj Bou Arréridj
17:45	Gagaa 90'	Soccerway report	Zaâlani 42'; Belkacemi 65'; Abid 69' (pen.)	Stadium: August 20, 1955 Stadium; Referee: Ahmed Bouzrar

29 February 2020 Round 20	AS Ain M'lila	2–0	CA Bordj Bou Arreridj	Aïn M'lila
15:00	Tiaiba 53'; Ziad 72'	Soccerway report		Stadium: Touhami Zoubir Khelifi Stadium; Attendance: 0 (close doors); Referee: Houssam Benyahia

5 March 2020 Round 21	CA Bordj Bou Arreridj	3–0	MC Alger	Bordj Bou Arréridj
16:00	Djahnit 1'; Elghomari 56' (pen.); Yousif 59'	Soccerway report		Stadium: August 20, 1955 Stadium; Referee: Malek Ait Ameur

15 March 2020 Round 22	JS Saoura	1–0	CA Bordj Bou Arreridj	Béchar
18:30	Lahmeri 30'	Soccerway report		Stadium: Stade 20 Août 1955; Attendance: 0 (close doors); Referee: Mehdi Abid Charef
Note: due to coronavirus outbreak, Ministry of Health, Population and Hospital Reform decided to be all matches played behind closed doors.

Round 23	CA Bordj Bou Arreridj	Cancelled	USM Alger	Bordj Bou Arréridj
				Stadium: August 20, 1955 Stadium

Round 24	MC Oran	Cancelled	CA Bordj Bou Arreridj	Oran
				Stadium: Ahmed Zabana Stadium

Round 25	Paradou AC	Cancelled	CA Bordj Bou Arreridj	Bologhine
				Stadium: Omar Hamadi Stadium

Round 26	CA Bordj Bou Arreridj	Cancelled	NC Magra	Bordj Bou Arréridj
				Stadium: August 20, 1955 Stadium

Round 27	NA Hussein Dey	Cancelled	CA Bordj Bou Arreridj	Belouizdad
				Stadium: Stade 20 Août 1955

Round 28	CA Bordj Bou Arreridj	Cancelled	US Biskra	Bordj Bou Arréridj
				Stadium: August 20, 1955 Stadium

Round 29	JS Kabylie	Cancelled	CA Bordj Bou Arreridj	Tizi Ouzou
				Stadium: Stade 1er Novembre 1954

Round 30	CA Bordj Bou Arreridj	Cancelled	ASO Chlef	Bordj Bou Arréridj
				Stadium: August 20, 1955 Stadium

== Algerian Cup ==
28 December 2019 Round of 64	CA Bordj Bou Arreridj	3–1	IR Mécheria	Bordj Bou Arréridj
17:30	Arroussi 27'; Gadacha 65'; Belmokhtar 84'	Report	Knanda 21'	Stadium: August 20, 1955 Stadium; Referee: Ali Nader
Note: Lineup for CA Bordj Bou Arreridj - Bouhalfaya, Baouche, Amrane, Arroussi, Hammouche, Diomande, Gadacha (Saidi 87’), Gagaa, Belmokhtar, Aissa El Bey (Droueche 46’), Youcef Djahnit (Laâlaoui 53’)

4 January 2020 Round of 32	CA Bordj Bou Arreridj	1–0	AS Khroub	Bordj Bou Arréridj
14:00	Amrane 14'	Report		Stadium: August 20, 1955 Stadium; Referee: Hamza Bouslimani
Note: Lineup for CA Bordj Bou Arreridj - Si Mohamed, Aggoun, Gattal, Amrane, Diomande, Hammouche, Gadacha, Gagaa, Belmokhtar (Rahmani 57’), Laâlaoui (Benzarroum 83’), Baouche (Saidi 75’)

13 February 2020 Round of 16	AS Ain M'lila	1–3	CA Bordj Bou Arreridj	Aïn M'lila
15:00	Debbih 70'	Report	Belameiri 24'; Benayad 45'; Djahnit 57'	Stadium: Touhami Zoubir Khelifi Stadium; Referee: Abderrezzak Arab
Note: Lineup for CA Bordj Bou Arreridj - Si Mohamed, Aggoun, Isla, Gagaa, Arroussi, Sebie, Djahnit (Baouche, 88'), Amrane, Benayad (Gadacha, 63'), Belameiri (Belmokhtar, 77'), Al Ghorbal

10 March 2020 QF 1st leg	CA Bordj Bou Arreridj	1–1	ES Sétif	Bordj Bou Arreridj
16:00	Yousif 90+5'	Soccerway report	Touré 66'	Stadium: August 20, 1955 Stadium; Referee: Mohamed Boutaraa

21 March 2020 QF 2nd leg	ES Sétif	Cancelled	CA Bordj Bou Arreridj	Sétif
TBD		Soccerway report		Stadium: Stade 8 Mai 1945

== Squad information ==
=== Playing statistics ===
No.	Pos	Nat	Player	Total		Ligue 1		Algerian Cup	
No.	Pos	Nat	Player	Apps	Goals	Apps	Goals	Apps	Goals
Goalkeepers
1	GK	(Algeria) ALG	Faouzi Chaouchi	0	0	0	0	0	0
16	GK	(Algeria) ALG	Cédric Si Mohamed	22	0	19	0	3	0
30	GK	(Algeria) ALG	Zakaria Bouhalfaya	3	0	2	0	1	0
Defenders
5	DF	(Algeria) ALG	Said Arroussi	20	4	17	3	3	1
12	DF	(Algeria) ALG	Meziane Zeroual	4	0	4	0	0	0
13	DF	(Algeria) ALG	Farès Aggoun	8	0	6	0	2	0
15	DF	(Algeria) ALG	Mohamed El Amine Hammouche	15	0	13	0	2	0
17	DF	(Algeria) ALG	Mohamed Amrane	12	1	8	0	4	1
20	DF	(Algeria) ALG	Oussama Gattal	15	0	14	0	1	0
23	DF	(Algeria) ALG	Abdelghani Khiat	2	0	2	0	0	0
28	DF	(Algeria) ALG	Touhami Sebie	11	0	9	0	2	0
26	DF	(Algeria) ALG	Amine Aissa El Bey	16	0	14	0	2	0
11	DF	(Algeria) ALG	Houari Baouche	24	0	20	0	4	0
6	DF	(Algeria) ALG	Houd Rahmani	1	0	0	0	1	0
Midfielders
14	MF	(Ivory Coast) CIV	Isla Daoudi Diomande	16	1	13	1	3	0
18	MF	(Algeria) ALG	Aikel Gadacha	24	1	20	0	4	1
	MF	(Algeria) ALG	Abdellah Daouadji	7	0	6	0	1	0
25	MF	(Algeria) ALG	El Hedi Belameiri	17	3	15	2	2	1
19	MF	(Algeria) ALG	Ahmed Gagaa	18	1	14	1	4	0
Forwards
7	FW	(Algeria) ALG	Mehdi Droueche	1	0	0	0	1	0
8	FW	(Algeria) ALG	Mourad Benayad	16	3	15	2	1	1
9	FW	(Algeria) ALG	Youcef Djahnit	22	4	19	3	3	1
10	FW	(Algeria) ALG	Mohamed El Amine Belmokhtar	21	1	18	0	3	1
21	FW	(Algeria) ALG	Nour El Islam Melikchi	0	0	0	0	0	0
	FW	(Algeria) ALG	Tawfiq Elghomari	7	1	6	1	1	0
	FW	(Sudan) SDN	Mohamed Abderrahmane Al Ghorbal	8	3	6	2	2	1
	FW	(Algeria) ALG	Sofiane Fouad Lachahab	4	0	4	0	0	0
	FW	(Algeria) ALG	Noufel Lalaoui	5	0	3	0	2	0
	FW	(Algeria) ALG	Laïd Saïdi	6	0	3	0	3	0
Players transferred out during the season
24	MF	(Algeria) ALG	Toufik Zerara	14	1	14	1	0	0
29	FW	(Ivory Coast) CIV	Ghislain Guessan	5	1	5	1	0	0

Last updated: 11 June 2018
Source: fr.soccerway.com

=== Goalscorers ===
Includes all competitive matches. The list is sorted alphabetically by surname when total goals are equal.

No.	Nat.	Player	Pos.	L 1	AC	TOTAL
9	(Algeria)	Youcef Djahnit	MF	3	1	4
5	(Algeria)	Said Arroussi	DF	3	1	4
25	(Algeria)	El Hedi Belameiri	MF	2	1	3
8	(Algeria)	Mourad Benayad	FW	2	1	3
	(Sudan)	Mohamed Abderrahmane Al Ghorbal	FW	2	1	3
17	(Algeria)	Mohamed Amrane	DF	0	1	1
14	(Ivory Coast)	Isla Daoudi Diomande	MF	1	0	1
19	(Algeria)	Ahmed Gagaa	MF	1	0	1
18	(Algeria)	Aikel Gadacha	MF	0	1	1
29	(Ivory Coast)	Ghislain Guessan	FW	1	0	1
24	(Algeria)	Toufik Zerara	MF	1	0	1
29	(Algeria)	Tawfiq Elghomari	FW	1	0	1
10	(Algeria)	Mohamed El Amine Belmokhtar	FW	0	1	1
Own Goals				0	0	0
Totals				22	8	30

== Transfers ==
=== In ===
Date	Pos	Player	from club	Transfer fee	Source
24 June 2019	FW	(Algeria) Mohamed El Amine Belmokhtar	CS Constantine	Free transfer	
24 June 2019	FW	(Algeria) Ahmed Gagaa	CS Constantine	Free transfer	
24 June 2019	MF	(Algeria) El Hedi Belameiri	(Cyprus) Alki Oroklini	Free transfer	
2 July 2019	FW	(Ivory Coast) Ghislain Guessan	(Romania) Concordia Chiajna	Free transfer	
4 July 2019	DF	(Algeria) Meziane Zeroual	CR Belouizdad	Free transfer	
4 July 2019	DF	(Algeria) Mohamed El Amine Hammouche	(Saudi Arabia) Al-Qaisumah	Free transfer	
6 July 2019	GK	(Algeria) Cédric Si Mohamed	CR Belouizdad	Free transfer	
7 July 2019	FW	(Algeria) Mourad Benayad	USM Bel Abbès	Free transfer	
9 July 2019	DF	(Algeria) Kheireddine Arroussi	CS Constantine	Free transfer	
4 January 2020	FW	(Algeria) Tawfiq Elghomari	Olympique de Médéa	Free transfer	
19 January 2020	FW	(Sudan) Mohamed Abderrahmane Al Ghorbal	(Sudan) Al-Merrikh	Free transfer	
21 January 2020	MF	(Algeria) Abdellah Daouadji	JS Saoura	Free transfer	

=== Out ===
Date	Pos	Player	to club	Transfer fee	Source
2 July 2019	DF	(Algeria) Mohamed Khoutir Ziti	CR Belouizdad	Free transfer	
3 July 2019	MF	(Algeria) Messaoud Gherbi	MO Béjaïa	Free transfer	
4 July 2019	FW	(Algeria) Walid Athmani	CS Constantine	Free transfer	
9 July 2019	MF	(Algeria) Bassam Chaouti	MC Oran	Free transfer	
19 July 2019	MF	(Algeria) Abdelmalek Meftahi	JSM Béjaïa	Free transfer	
7 January 2020	MF	(Algeria) Toufik Zerara	CR Belouizdad	Free transfer	
