= 2018 Algerian Super Cup =

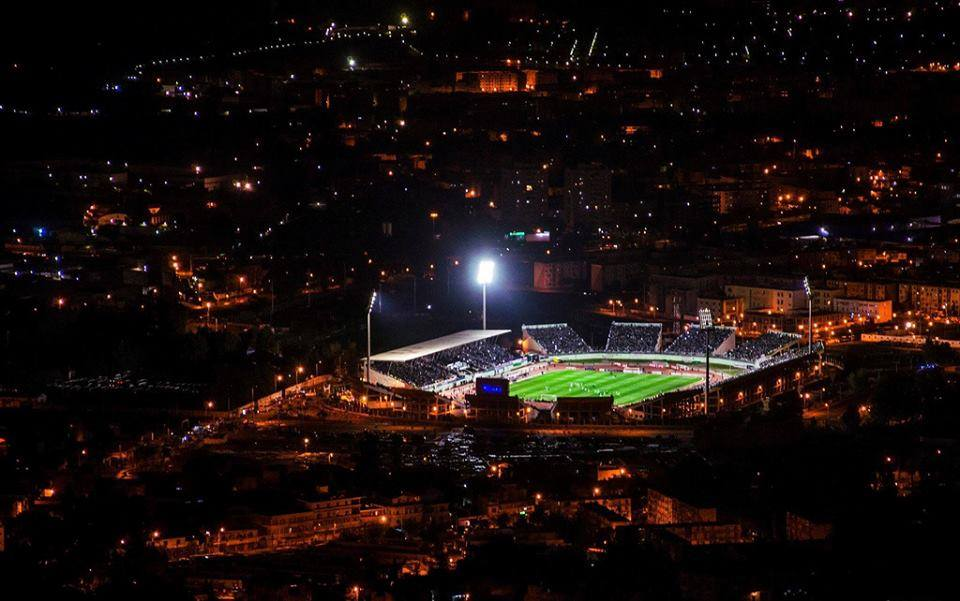
- Mustapha Tchaker Stadium hosted the match
CS Constantine	USM Bel Abbès
Ligue 1	Algerian Cup
0	1
- Date: 1 November 2018
- Venue: Mustapha Tchaker Stadium, Blida
- Referee: Mohamed Saïdi
- Attendance: 15,000
- Weather: Rainy; 15 °C (59 °F); 82% humidity

The 2018 Algerian Super Cup was the 12th edition of the Algerian Super Cup, a football match contested by the winners of the 2017–18 Algerian Ligue Professionnelle 1 and 2017–18 Algerian Cup competitions. It is known as the Mobilis Supercoupe d'Algérie 2018 due to a sponsorship deal with Mobilis ATM. The match was played on November 1, 2018 at Mustapha Tchaker Stadium in Blida. Algerian Cup winners USM Bel Abbès defeated Ligue 1 winners CS Constantine with a score of 1-0.

== Match details ==
1 November 2018
17:00

CS Constantine	0–1
	Report	Lamara 90+4' (pen.)

Mustapha Tchaker Stadium, Blida
Referee: Mohamed Saïdi

GK	16	(Algeria) Chamseddine Rahmani
DF	3	(Algeria) Houcine Benayada
DF	23	(Algeria) Nasreddine Zaâlani
DF	20	(Algeria) Islam Chahrour
DF	28	(Algeria) Yacine Salhi
MF	13	(Algeria) Sid Ali Lamri (c)
MF	8	(Algeria) Fouad Haddad
MF	10	(Algeria) Kaddour Beldjilali	(substituted off) 66'
FW	18	(Algeria) Abdenour Belkheir
FW	24	(Algeria) Ismaïl Belkacemi	(substituted off) 90+6'
FW	26	(Algeria) Nassim Zitouni	(substituted off) 46'
Substitutes :
MF	17	(Algeria) Mohamed Walid Bencherifa	(substituted on) 66'
GK	1	(Algeria) Houssam Limane
MF	6	(Burkina Faso) Ousmane Sylla
DF	24	(Algeria) Sofiane Khadir
FW	15	(Algeria) Mounir Aichi	(substituted on) 90+6'
MF	7	(Algeria) Amine Belmokhtar	(substituted on) 46'
FW	29	(Algeria) Ahmed Gagaa
Manager :
(Algeria) Abdelkader Amrani

GK	1	(Algeria) Nadjib Ghoul
DF	3	(Algeria) Boualem Mesmoudi
DF	19	(Algeria) Zakaria Khali	(yellow card) 77' (c)
DF	22	(Algeria) Ishak Guebli
DF	15	(Algeria) Nabil Lamara
MF	23	(Algeria) Nabil Aït Ferguene
MF	6	(Algeria) Mohamed Lagraâ
MF	10	(Algeria) Abdessamed Bounoua	(yellow card) 61'
FW	27	(Algeria) Abdelkrim Zouari		(substituted off) 69'
FW	11	(Algeria) Mourad Benayad		(substituted off) 73'
MF	5	(Algeria) Larbi Tabti		(substituted off) 83'
Substitutes :
MF	17	(Algeria) Ishak Bouda		(substituted on) 69'
FW	21	(Algeria) Mohamed Seguer		(substituted on) 73'
GK	30	(Algeria) Abdelkader Zarat
FW	26	(Algeria) Mouloud Nabil Metref		(substituted on) 83'
FW	8	(Algeria) Hamza Belahouel
MF	29	(Algeria) Yahia Labani
DF	20	(Algeria) Abderrahim Abdelli
Manager :
(Algeria) Youcef Bouzidi

Assistant referees:
Sid Ali Brahim
Nabil Bounoua
Fourth official:
Ahmed Bouzrar

Match rules

- 90 minutes.
- Penalty shoot-out if scores level.
- Seven named substitutes, of which up to three may be used.

== See also ==
- 2017–18 Algerian Ligue Professionnelle 1
- 2017–18 Algerian Cup
