= Ousmane Sylla =

Ousmane Sylla may refer to:

- Ousmane Sylla (Senegalese footballer) (born 2001)
- Ousmane Sylla (Burkinabé footballer) (born 1990)
