= Mahamadou Traoré =

Malian footballer

Personal information
- Full name: Mahamadou Traoré
- Date of birth: 31 December 1994 (age 31)
- Place of birth: Mali
- Height: 5 ft 10 in (1.78 m)
- Position: Defender

Senior career*
Years	Team	Apps	(Gls)
2014–2015	Djoliba AC		
2015	Chabab Atlas Khénifra		
2015–2017	Chabab Rif Al Hoceima		
2018–2019	RAC Casablanca		
2019–2020	CS Constantine		
2020–2021	Olympique Béja		
2021–2022	Al Akhdar		
2022–2023	Chabab Rif Al Hoceima		
2023–2024	Al-Ghar		
2024–2025	Al-Omran		

International career
2013–2014	Mali	3	(0)
- * Club domestic league appearances and goals as of 19 August 2019

Mahamadou Traoré is a Malian professional footballer, who plays as a defender.

== International career ==
In January 2014, coach Djibril Dramé, invited him to be a part of the Mali squad for the 2014 African Nations Championship. He helped the team to the quarter finals where they lost to Zimbabwe by two goals to one.
