= Foued Hadded =

Algerian footballer (born 1990)

Personal information
- Date of birth: 1 November 1990 (age 36)
- Place of birth: Collo, Algeria
- Position: Midfielder

Team information
- Current team: MO Béjaïa
- Number: 13

Senior career*
Years	Team	Apps	(Gls)
2010–2014	ES Collo	37	(1)
2014–2018	DRB Tadjenanet	90	(1)
2018–2021	CS Constantine	61	(2)
2021–2022	HB Chelghoum Laïd	28	(1)
2022–2023	USM Khenchela	29	(0)
2023–2025	NC Magra	48	(1)
2025–2026	RC Kouba	19	(0)
2026–	MO Béjaïa	0	(0)
- * Club domestic league appearances and goals as of 27 July 2026

Foued Hadded (born 1 November 1990) is an Algerian footballer who plays for MO Béjaïa as a midfielder.

== Career ==
In 2018, he joined for CS Constantine. In August 2020, he extended his contract with CS Constantine. In September 2021, he joined HB Chelghoum Laïd. In August 2022, he signed for USM Khenchela. In August 2023, he joined NC Magra. In July 2025, he signed for RC Kouba. On 26 July 2026, he joined MO Béjaïa.
