= Moctar Cissé =

Malian footballer

Personal information
- Full name: Moctar Mohamed Cissé
- Date of birth: 10 March 1993 (age 33)
- Place of birth: Bamako, Mali
- Height: 1.76 m (5 ft 9 in)
- Position: Forward

Team information
- Current team: US Biskra
- Number: 15

Senior career*
Years	Team	Apps	(Gls)
20??–2014	AS Real Bamako		
2014–2015	Stade Malien		
2015–2016	Wydad Casablanca	7	(2)
2016	→ AS Salé (loan)	10	(5)
2016–2017	KF Tirana	23	(2)
2017–2018	CS Constantine	23	(4)
2018	NA Hussein Dey	2	(0)
2019	Al-Ain	?	(?)
2019–	US Biskra		

International career^{‡}
2015–	Mali	2	(0)
- * Club domestic league appearances and goals as of 31 July 2019 ‡ National team caps and goals as of 07:40, 26 October 2016 (UTC)

Moctar Mohamed Cissé (born 10 March 1993) is a Mali international footballer who is playing for US Biskra. He previously played for Malian clubs AS Real Bamako and Stade Malien and for Moroccan clubs Wydad Casablanca and AS Salé. He has represented his country at under-23 and senior level.

== Club career ==
Playing for AS Real Bamako, Cissé finished the 2013–14 season as Malian Première Division joint top scorer, with 15 goals. His goal in the away leg against Enyimba helped his club proceed to the second qualifying round of the 2014 CAF Champions League on away goals., Although Real lost in that round, they were able to qualify for the 2014 CAF Confederation Cup group stage.

Cissé signed for Malian champions Stade Malien for the new season. He played and scored for them in the 2015 CAF Champions League, and, as in the previous season, failed to reach the main competition but qualified for the Confederation Cup group stage.

He moved on to reigning Moroccan champions Wydad Casablanca ahead of the 2015–16 season. He scored twice in the second match of the season in a 3–1 defeat of 2015 runners-up Olympique Club de Khouribga. After some confusion about his destination, Cissé spent the second half of the season on loan at AS Salé of the Moroccan second tier.

He joined Albanian Superliga club KF Tirana ahead of the 2016–17 season, signing a two-year contract. However, Wydad Casablanca claimed he was still under contract to them. The player appealed to FIFA, who ruled that he was free to play for KF Tirana, and he finally made his debut on 16 October in a 2–1 win against Skënderbeu.

== International career ==
Cissé has represented his country in the qualification process for the 2015 Africa U-23 Cup of Nations, which doubled as qualifiers for the 2016 Olympics, and, at senior level, in the 2016 CHAN qualifiers.

== Honours ==
Tirana

- Albanian Cup (1): 2016–17
