= Ismaïl Belkacemi =

Algerian footballer (born 1993)

Personal information
- Full name: Ismaïl Abdelfetah Belkacemi
- Date of birth: 24 June 1993 (age 33)
- Place of birth: Sour El-Ghozlane, Algeria
- Height: 1.72 m (5 ft 8 in)
- Position: Forward

Team information
- Current team: Al-Shomooa
- Number: 10

Youth career
- –2014: ASO Chlef

Senior career*
Years	Team	Apps	(Gls)
2014–2015	USMM Hadjout		
2015–2018	MO Béjaïa	45	(5)
2018–2020	CS Constantine	48	(14)
2020–2025	USM Alger	117	(44)
2025–2026	Al Ahli SC	8	(0)
2026–	Al-Shomooa	2	(0)

International career^{‡}
2021–	Algeria A'	1	(0)
- * Club domestic league appearances and goals as of 19 March 2026 ‡ National team caps and goals as of 17 June 2021

Ismaïl Abdelfetah Belkacemi (Arabic: إسماعيل عبد الفتاح بلقاسمي; born 24 June 1993) is an Algerian footballer who plays as a forward for Al-Shomooa in the Libyan Premier League.

== Club career ==
In 2015, Belkacemi signed a two-year contract with MO Béjaïa.

In 2018, He signed a two-year contract with CS Constantine.

=== USM Alger ===
On 16 September 2020, Belkacemi joined USM Alger for three seasons. Belkacemi made his debut for the team in the Super Cup final as a starter in a loss against CR Belouizdad. On 16 January 2021, Belkacemi scored his first goal against RC Relizane, after which he scored a braces in four matches. Belkacemi finished the Ligue 1 scorers' rankings in third place behind Amir Sayoud and Billel Messaoudi. In September 2022, Belkacemi returned to the field after being absent for several weeks due to injury, more than beneficial return for the Usmists who will be able to count on the services of their adventurer, who they sorely missed at the start of the season. On 3 June 2023, Belkacemi won the first title in his football career by winning the 2022–23 CAF Confederation Cup after defeating Young Africans of Tanzania. On 16 August 2023, Belkacemi renewed his contract for two seasons until 2025 along with nine other players.

On 15 September 2023, Belkacemi won the CAF Super Cup title after winning against Al Ahly, it is the second African title with USM Alger in three months. On 6 May 2024, Belkacemi scored a brace against JS Kabylie in a match that ended in a 2–2 draw. Four days later, Belkacemi scored another brace against MC El Bayadh, where he led USM Alger to a difficult victory with a score of 2–1. On 11 June 2024, Belkacemi scored a hat-trick against US Souf. On 14 June 2024, Belkacemi won the title of top scorer in the Ligue 1 with 14 goals shared with Youcef Belaïli. Belkacemi said that after a difficult season, he finished with the top scorer title despite his absence from several matches due to injuries. Belkacemi talk about his future that he has contacts with many Algerian and foreign clubs, but in the absence of important offers from abroad, Belkacemi said that he will not leave USM Alger. On 13 February 2025, after four years with the club, USM Alger announced the departure of Belkacemi to Al Ahli SC for $450,000.

== Career statistics ==
=== Club ===
As of 10 February 2025

Appearances and goals by club, season and competition
Club	Season	League			Cup		Continental		Other		Total	
Club	Season	Division	Apps	Goals	Apps	Goals	Apps	Goals	Apps	Goals	Apps	Goals
USMM Hadjout	2014–15	Ligue 2	25	12	—		—		—		25	12
MO Béjaïa	2015–16	Ligue 1	22	3	2	0	4 (Note: One appearance in CAF Champions League, three appearances in CAF Confederation Cup)	0	1 (Note: Appearances in Algerian Super Cup)	0	29	3
MO Béjaïa	2016–17	Ligue 1	24	2	—		4 (Note: Appearance(s) in CAF Confederation Cup)	0	—		28	3
MO Béjaïa	2017–18	Ligue 2	25	13	3	1	—		—		28	14
MO Béjaïa	Total		71	18	5	1	8	0	1	0	85	20
CS Constantine	2018–19	Ligue 1	28	8	5	2	10 (Note: Appearance(s) in CAF Champions League)	2	1	0	44	12
CS Constantine	2019–20	Ligue 1	20	6	3	0	—		2 (Note: Appearance(s) in Arab Club Champions Cup)	1	25	7
CS Constantine	Total		48	14	8	2	10	2	3	1	69	19
USM Alger	2020–21	Ligue 1	37	16	—		—		4 (Note: One appearance in Algerian Super Cup, three appearances in Algerian League Cup)	1	41	17
USM Alger	2021–22	Ligue 1	25	8	—		—		—		25	8
USM Alger	2022–23	Ligue 1	18	2	1	0	14	1	—		33	3
USM Alger	2023–24	Ligue 1	26	14	3	3	9 (Note: One appearance in CAF Super Cup, eight appearances in CAF Confederation Cup)	0	—		38	17
USM Alger	2024–25	Ligue 1	11	4	2	1	6 (Note: Five appearances in CAF Confederation Cup)	5	—		19	10
USM Alger	Total		117	44	6	4	29	6	4	1	156	55
Career total			261	88	19	7	47	8	8	1	335	104

== Honours ==
USM Alger

- CAF Confederation Cup: 2022–23
- CAF Super Cup: 2023

Al Ahli SC Tripoli

- Libyan Premier League: 2024–25
- Libyan Cup: 2024–25

Individual

- Algerian Ligue Professionnelle 1 top scorer: 2023–24
- CAF Confederation Cup top scorer: 2024–25
