= Chamseddine Rahmani =

Algerian footballer (born 1990)

Personal information
- Full name: Chamseddine Rahmani
- Date of birth: 15 September 1990 (age 36)
- Place of birth: Annaba, Algeria
- Height: 1.93 m (6 ft 4 in)
- Position: Goalkeeper

Team information
- Current team: ASO Chlef
- Number: 30

Youth career
- US Mars Omar
- IRB El Hadjar
- –2010: USM Annaba

Senior career*
Years	Team	Apps	(Gls)
2010–2012	HAMR Annaba		
2012–2014	USM Annaba	27	(0)
2014–2017	MO Béjaïa	62	(0)
2017–2019	CS Constantine	41	(0)
2019	Damac	12	(0)
2020–2023	CS Constantine	87	(0)
2023–2024	JS Kabylie	17	(0)
2024–2025	MC Oran	18	(0)
2026–	ASO Chlef	4	(0)

International career^{‡}
2013–2017	Algeria U23	4	(0)
2022–	Algeria A'	4	(0)
2017–	Algeria	1	(0)
- * Club domestic league appearances and goals as of 5 June 2026 ‡ National team caps and goals as of 17 November 2017

Chamseddine Rahmani (Arabic: شمس الدين رحماني; Tamazight: ⵙⵀⴰⵎⵙⴻⴷⴷⵉⵏⴻ ⵔⴰⵀⵎⴰⵏⵉ; born 15 September 1990) is an Algerian professional footballer who plays as a goalkeeper for ASO Chlef.

== Club career ==
In January 2016, Rahmani extended his contract with MO Béjaïa for another 2 years. In May 2019, Rahmani joined Saudi Pro League club Damac. He signed a one-year contract with the option to extend for a further year. After making 12 appearances for the club, his contract was ended six months early in January 2020. In January 2020, Rahmani returned to Algeria and joined former club CS Constantine. In July 2023, Rahmani joined JS Kabylie. In July 2024, Rahmani signed for MC Oran. On 27 January 2026, he joined ASO Chlef.

== International career ==
In September 2016 Rahmani received his first ever call-up to the Algeria national football team for a 2018 FIFA World Cup qualifier against Cameroon.

== Honours ==
MO Béjaïa

- Algerian Cup: 2014–15
- Algerian Super Cup runner-up: 2015
- CAF Confederation Cup runner-up: 2016

CS Constantine

- Algerian Ligue 1: 2017–18
- Algerian Super Cup runner-up: 2018

Algeria U23

- Islamic Solidarity Games third place: 2017

Algeria A'

- CHAN runner-up: 2022
