= Cédric Si Mohamed =

Algerian professional goalkeeper (born 1985)

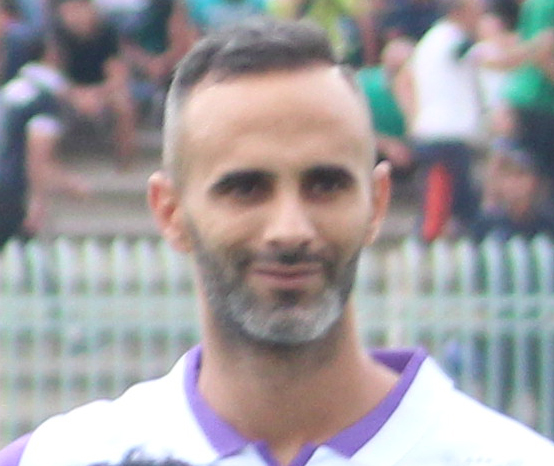
- Si Mohammed in the 2015–16 season

Personal information
- Full name: Cédric Si Mohamed
- Date of birth: 9 January 1985 (age 41)
- Place of birth: Roanne, France
- Height: 1.83 m (6 ft 0 in)
- Position: Goalkeeper

Youth career
- 1998–2004: Gueugnon

Senior career*
Years	Team	Apps	(Gls)
2005–2006	Yzeure	24	(0)
2006–2007	Jura Sud	16	(0)
2007–2008	Vesoul	34	(0)
2008–2009	FC Montceau	11	(0)
2009–2013	JSM Béjaïa	90	(0)
2013–2017	CS Constantine	99	(0)
2017–2018	US Biskra	14	(0)
2018–2019	CR Belouizdad	16	(0)
2019–2021	CA Bordj Bou Arréridj	40	(0)

International career^{‡}
2010–2011	Algeria A'	6	(0)
2010–2015	Algeria	1	(0)
- * Club domestic league appearances and goals as of 1 July 2021 ‡ National team caps and goals as of 00:00, 26 May 2012 (UTC)

Cédric Si Mohamed (born 9 January 1985) is a former professional footballer who played as a goalkeeper. Born in France, he earned one international cap for Algeria and represented the country at the 2014 FIFA World Cup.
