= Nassim Zitouni =

French footballer (born 1994)

Personal information
- Full name: Nassim Farouk Zitouni
- Date of birth: March 31, 1994 (age 32)
- Place of birth: Sétif, Algeria
- Height: 1.83 m (6 ft 0 in)
- Position: Midfielder

Team information
- Current team: SO Châtellerault

Youth career
- 2011–2014: Olympique Lyon

Senior career*
Years	Team	Apps	(Gls)
2011–2014	Olympique Lyon B	25	(1)
2014–2016	Vitória Guimarães B	35	(1)
2015–2016	Vitória Guimarães	4	(0)
2016	→ Porto B (loan)	8	(0)
2016–2017	Strasbourg	2	(0)
2018	Dunav Ruse	9	(0)
2018–2019	Constantine	9	(0)
2019	Tuzla City	7	(0)
2020–2021	Granville	6	(0)
2021–2022	Biesheim	6	(0)
2022–	Châtellerault	5	(0)

International career
2010–2011	France U17	3	(1)
2011–2012	France U18	2	(1)
- * Club domestic league appearances and goals as of 19:30, 5 November 2022 (UTC)

Nassim Zitouni (born 31 March 1994) is a professional footballer who plays as a midfielder for French Championnat National 3 team SO Châtellerault. Born in Algeria, he represented France at youth level.

Zitouni became the first ever player to receive a call-up to the French national U18 team whilst playing at amateur level, when he was called-up while playing at AS Saint-Priest.

== Honours ==
=== Club ===
Porto B

- LigaPro: 2015–16
