= Houcine Benayada =

Algerian footballer (born 1992)

Personal information
- Full name: Houcine Benayada
- Date of birth: 8 August 1992 (age 34)
- Place of birth: Oran, Algeria
- Height: 1.86 m (6 ft 1 in)
- Position: Centre-back

Team information
- Current team: CR Belouizdad
- Number: 3

Youth career
- ASM Oran

Senior career*
Years	Team	Apps	(Gls)
2010–2015	ASM Oran	101	(3)
2015–2016	USM Alger	14	(0)
2016–2020	CS Constantine	98	(2)
2021	ES Sahel	27	(2)
2022–2023	Wydad AC	12	(0)
2023–	CR Belouizdad	79	(1)

International career^{‡}
2019–2025	Algeria A'	2	(0)
2021–2022	Algeria	9	(0)
Medal record
Men's football
Representing Algeria
FIFA Arab Cup
Winner	2021 Qatar
- * Club domestic league appearances and goals as of 5 June 2026 ‡ National team caps and goals as of 27 November 2025

Houcine Benayada (Arabic: حسين بن عيادة; born 8 August 1992) is an Algerian professional footballer who plays for CR Belouizdad and the Algeria national team. He plays primarily as a centre-back but can also play as a right-back.

== Club career ==
On 16 June 2015 Benayada signed a two-year contract with USM Alger. In 2016 he signed with CS Constantine, and in 2020 he joined the Tunisian team Club Africain.

=== Wydad AC ===
On 3 September 2022, Benayada joined African champions Wydad AC as a free agent.

=== CR Belouizdad ===
On 22 August 2023, he joined CR Belouizdad.

== International career ==
In June 2015, after an impressive first season in the top flight with ASM Oran, Benayada was handed his first call up to Algeria national team for a 2017 Africa Cup of Nations qualifier against Seychelles. He was named on the substitute's bench for the match but did not participate.

He was a part in the 2021 FIFA Arab Cup winning team.

== Honours ==
USM Alger

- Algerian Ligue Professionnelle 1 (1): 2015-16

CS Constantine

- Algerian Ligue Professionnelle 1 (1): 2017-18

Algeria

- FIFA Arab Cup: 2021
