= Houssam Limane =

Algerian footballer (born 1990)

Personal information
- Full name: Houssam Limane
- Date of birth: 18 January 1990 (age 36)
- Place of birth: Arzew, Algeria
- Position: Goalkeeper

Youth career
- USM El Harrach

Senior career*
Years	Team	Apps	(Gls)
2009–2016	USM El Harrach	25	(0)
2016–2020	CS Constantine	31	(0)
2020–2021	MC Oran	3	(0)

International career^{‡}
2010	Algeria U23	4	(0)
- * Club domestic league appearances and goals as of 20:45, 15 March 2021 (UTC) ‡ National team caps and goals as of 10:00, 23 February 2011 (UTC)

Houssam Limane (born 18 January 1990) is an Algerian football player. He currently played for MC Oran in the Algerian Ligue Professionnelle 1.
