= El Hedi Belameiri =

French footballer (born 1991)

Personal information
- Full name: El Hedi Belameiri
- Date of birth: 24 April 1991 (age 35)
- Place of birth: Florange, France
- Height: 1.66 m (5 ft 5 in)
- Position: Midfielder

Team information
- Current team: ES Fameck
- Number: 7

Youth career
- 2008–2009: Metz

Senior career*
Years	Team	Apps	(Gls)
2009–2013	Amnéville	70	(18)
2013–2018	ES Sétif	98	(12)
2018–2019	Alki Oroklini	30	(4)
2019–2020	CA Bordj Bou Arréridj	15	(2)
2021	Monastir	2	(0)
2021-2025	Swift Hesperange	64	(7)
- * Club domestic league appearances and goals as of 6 July 2026

El Hedi Belameiri (born 24 April 1991) is a French footballer who plays for ES Fameck in France.

== Club career ==
In July 2013, Belameiri turned down an offer from JS Kabylie and signed a two-year contract with ES Sétif.

In August 2018, Belameiri signed with Alki Oroklini.

In January 2019, he signed with CA Bordj Bou Arréridj.

In 2021, he signed with Monastir, appearing only 2 times. He then signed with Swift Hesperange.

In 2025, Belameiri signed with ES Fameck.

== Personal life ==
Born in France, Belameiri is of Algerian descent.
