= Ousmane Sylla (Burkinabé footballer) =

Burkinabé footballer (born 1990)

Personal information
- Full name: Ousmane Junior Sylla
- Date of birth: 30 December 1990 (age 35)
- Position: Midfielder

Team information
- Current team: AS Douanes
- Number: 6

Senior career*
Years	Team	Apps	(Gls)
2014–2016	AS SONABEL		
2016–2017	Rail Club du Kadiogo		
2017–2020	CS Constantine	32	(0)
2019–2020	→ AS Aïn M'lila (loan)	27	(0)
2022–	AS Douanes	11	(0)

International career^{‡}
2016–2018	Burkina Faso	6	(0)
- * Club domestic league appearances and goals as of 17:36, 26 November 2023 (UTC) ‡ National team caps and goals as of 17:36, 26 November 2023 (UTC)

Ousmane Junior Sylla (born 30 December 1990) is a Burkinabé international footballer who plays as a midfielder for AS Douanes.

== Career ==
He has played club football for AS SONABEL, Rail Club du Kadiogo and CS Constantine. In January 2019 he moved on loan to AS Aïn M'lila. He signed for AS Douanes for the 2022–23 season.

He made his international debut for Burkina Faso in 2016.
