= Ahmed Gagaâ =

Algerian footballer (born 1994)

Personal information
- Full name: Ahmed Gagaâ
- Date of birth: December 21, 1994 (age 31)
- Place of birth: Sétif, Algeria
- Position: Midfielder

Team information
- Current team: NC Magra
- Number: 19

Youth career
- Paradou AC

Senior career*
Years	Team	Apps	(Gls)
2014–2018	Paradou AC	-	(-)
2014–2015	→ USM Bel-Abbès (loan)	14	(0)
2015–2016	→ JS Kabylie (loan)	7	(0)
2018–2019	CS Constantine	16	(0)
2019–2021	CA Bordj Bou Arréridj	35	(2)
2021–2022	Olympique de Médéa	29	(5)
2022	US Biskra	5	(0)
2023	Al-Entesar		
2023–2024	USM Khenchela	8	(0)
2024–2025	USM Annaba		
2025	Al Sadaqa SC	13	(1)
2025–2026	ES Mostaganem	26	(0)
2026–	NC Magra	0	(0)

International career
2015–2017	Algeria U23		
- * Club domestic league appearances and goals as of 5 August 2026

Ahmed Gagaâ (Arabic: أحمد قعقع; born December 21, 1994) is an Algerian footballer who plays for NC Magra.

== Club career ==
Born on December 21, 1994, Gagaâ spent his entire youth career with Paradou AC.

=== USM Bel-Abbès ===
In January 2015, Gagaâ was loaned out by Paradou AC to USM Bel-Abbès for the second half of the 2014–15 Algerian Ligue Professionnelle 1. On January 24, he made his professional debut, coming on as a substitute in the 66th minute in a league match against ES Sétif. He would go on to make 13 league appearances in the season, 12 of them as a starter but was unable to help Bel-Abbès avoid relegation.

=== JS Kabylie ===
In June 2015, Gagaâ was loaned out again by Paradou AC, this time to JS Kabylie for the 2015–16 season.

=== Paradou AC ===
He returned to Paradou AC in 2016, and he realized the accession to the Algerian Ligue Professionnelle 1 with his team.

=== CA Bordj Bou Arréridj ===
In 2019, he signed a two-year contract with CA Bordj Bou Arréridj.

=== US Biskra ===
In 2022, he joined US Biskra.

=== Al-Entesar ===
On 7 February 2023, Gagaâ joined Saudi Arabian club Al-Entesar.

=== USM Khenchela ===
On 17 August 2023, he joined USM Khenchela.

=== ES Mostaganem ===
On 28 July 2025, he joined ES Mostaganem.

=== NC Magra ===
In August 2026, he joined NC Magra.

== International career ==
On May 19, 2015, Gagaâ made his Algeria U23 debut, starting in a friendly match against Sudan.

In 2017, he participated with the Algerian team in the Islamic Solidarity Games in Bakou, when they obtained the bronze medal (third position). Gagaâ was the captain and he scored 2 goals against Turkey and Cameroon.
