= Lamine Abid =

Algerian footballer (born 1991)

Personal information
- Full name: Mohamed Lamine Abid
- Date of birth: July 4, 1991 (age 35)
- Place of birth: Larbatache, Algeria
- Height: 1.92 m (6 ft 4 in)
- Position: Forward

Team information
- Current team: CA Batna
- Number: 9

Senior career*
Years	Team	Apps	(Gls)
2011–2016	USM El Harrach	70	(16)
2015–2016	→ MC Alger (loan)	19	(3)
2016–2017	NA Hussein Dey	17	(2)
2017–2021	CS Constantine	72	(30)
2021–2022	HB Chelghoum Laïd	6	(0)
2022–2023	US Biskra	19	(4)
2023–2024	Hetten FC		
2024–2025	USM El Harrach		
2025–	CA Batna	9	(1)

International career^{‡}
2018	Algeria	1	(0)
- * Club domestic league appearances and goals as of 12 November 2025 ‡ National team caps and goals as of 23 March 2018

Mohamed Lamine Abid (born 4 July 1991) is an Algerian professional footballer who plays as a forward for CA Batna.

== Club career ==
In 2017, he signed a contract with CS Constantine. In 2021, he joined HB Chelghoum Laïd. In 2022, he joined US Biskra. In August 2023, he joined Saudi club Hetten FC.
