= CS Constantine =

Algerian football club

Club Sportif Constantinois
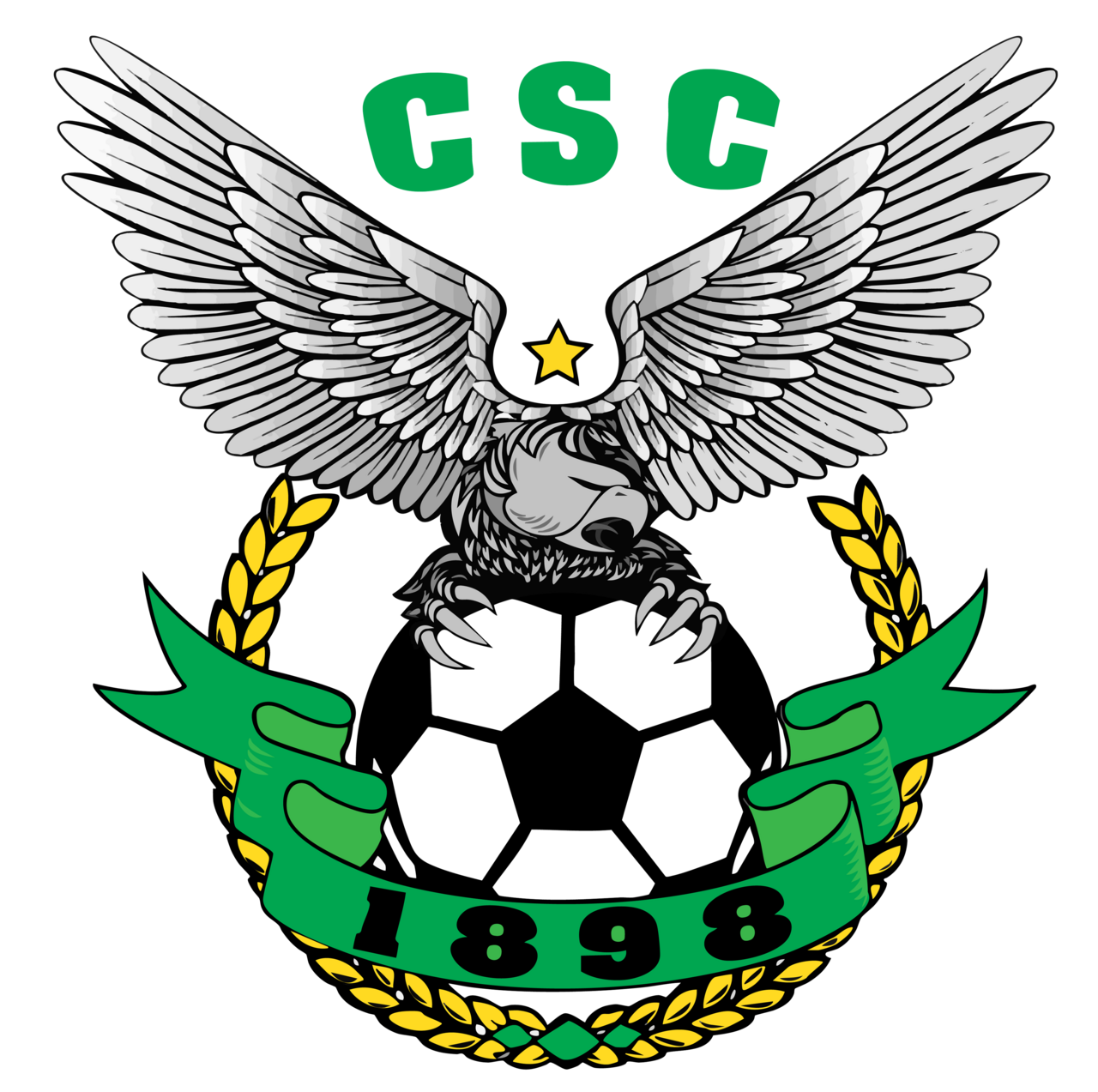
- Full name: Club Sportif Constantinois
- Nicknames: CSC, The Smurfs
- Founded: 1898; 128 years ago
- Ground: Chahid Hamlaoui Stadium; Ramadane Ben Abdelmalek Stadium
- Capacity: 22,968 (Chahid Hamlaoui Stadium); 8,000 (Ramadane Ben Abdelmalek Stadium)
- Owner: ENTP SPA
- Head Coach: Amara Merouani
- League: Ligue 1
- 2025–26: Ligue 1, 9th of 16
- Website: csconstantine.dz
Home colours	Away colours	Third colours

Club Sportif Constantinois (Arabic: النادي الرياضي القسنطيني), also known as CS Constantine or simply CSC for short, is an Algerian football club based in Constantine, Algeria. The club was founded in 1898, and its colours are green and black. Their home stadium, Chahid Hamlaoui Stadium, has a capacity of 22,968 spectators. The club is currently playing in the Algerian Ligue Professionnelle 1.

== History ==
CS Constantine was officially founded under the name of Iqbal Association in 1898. It was named Chabab Mécanique de Constantine from 1977 to 1987.

Tassili Airlines the airlines firm of the petroleum company Sonatrach sponsored the club from 2012 to 2016. And since 2016, the club was sponsored by the Entreprise Nationale des Travaux aux Puits (ENTP), another firm of Sonatrach.

=== The 1990s and the first title of the championship ===
For the second time in its history, the CSC succeeded in qualifying for the semi-final of the Algerian Cup in 1992, and lost to ASO Chlef (after shots on goal), at the Stade du 5 Juillet 1962. Two years later, the club snatched the title of league champion 2 for the 4th time. In this season the club dominated the D2 championship including the famous Constantine derby, the CSC beating the MO Constantine twice (3- 0 then 2–0). Promoted for the umpteenth time in 1994, the CSC won its first title in the history of Champion of Algeria during the 1996–97 season, with talented and experienced players at the national level (Isâad Bourahli, nicknamed the fox of the surfaces from the 1990s, Moudoud Kaoua, Réda Matem, Salim Laïb, Hassen Ghoula and Sid Ahmed Benamara). The same season, the CSC was a finalist in the international Black Stars tournament in Paris, after the semi-final victory over the Senegalese club ASC Diaraf. The following season (97–98), the club participated for the first time in the African Champions League. Exempted during the preliminary round of this edition the club, was eliminated against the Senegalese club AS Douanes in the first round, at the end of the season the CSC finishes 2nd in the championship of Algeria (Group A).

== Colours and badge ==
Under all three names the club has had the same goals and values: (Popular, Islamic); the same colours: Green (Hope) and black (Grief); and the same motto: 'Hope in Grief' (L'esperance en Deuil).

=== Kits ===
1926-1927	1933-1934	1938-1939	1946-1947	1952-1953	1964-1965	1968-1969

1969-1971	1974-1975	1988-1989	1990-1991	1996-1997	1997-1998	1999-2000

2000-2001	2003-2004	2008-2009	2010-2011	2011-2012	2012-2013	2013-2014

2014-2015	2015-2016	2017-2018	2018-2019	2019-2020	2020-2021	2023-2024

=== Crests ===
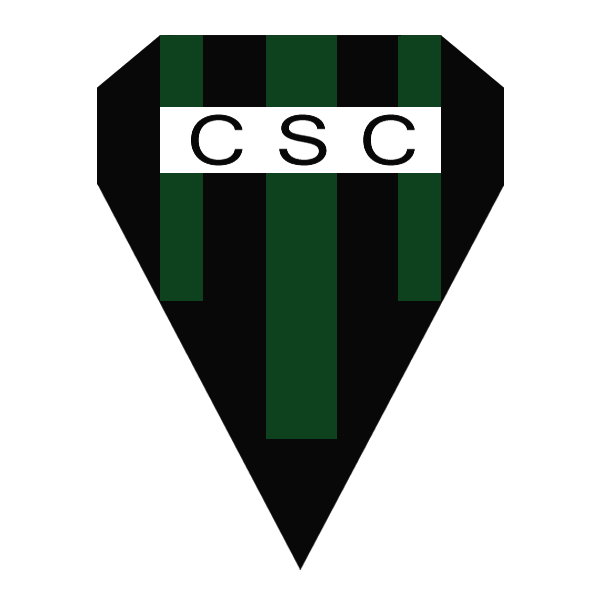
1938

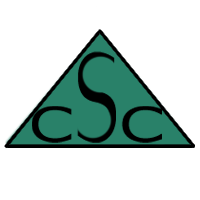
1936-1940

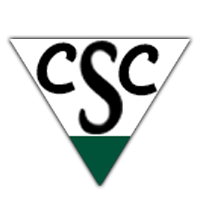
1946-1947

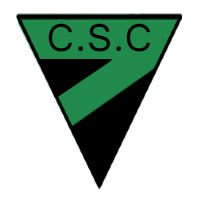
1969-1970

2013-2015

== Honours ==
=== Domestic competitions ===
- Algerian Ligue Professionnelle 1
  - Champion (2): 1996–97, 2017–18.
  - Runner-up : 1970–71, 2022–23.
- Ligue Professionnelle 2
  - Champion (6): 1969–70, 1976–77, 1985–86, 1993–94, 2003–04, 2010–11.
- Algerian Super Cup
  - Runner-up (1): 2018

== Performance in CAF competitions ==
CS Constantine whose team has regularly taken part in Confederation of African Football (CAF) competitions. Qualification for Algerian clubs is determined by a team's performance in its domestic league and cup competitions, CS Constantine have regularly qualified for the primary African competition, the African Cup, by winning the Ligue Professionnelle 1. CS Constantine have also achieved African qualification via the Algerian Cup and have played in the former African Cup Winners' Cup. The first continental participation was in 1998 in the CAF Champions League, and the first match was against AS Douanes and ended with a loss 2–1, As for the biggest defeat result was firstly in 2014 against ASN Nigelec, and the secondly in 2016 against Nasarawa United 4–1, and biggest loss in 2014 against ASEC Mimosas 6–0. so that CS Constantine was absent from the African competitions until 2014 Where did it participate in the CAF Confederation Cup, On 8 February 2014 witnessed a historic event when CS Constantine played two matches on the same day, the first in the Ligue Professionnelle 1 against MO Béjaïa and the second against ASN Nigelec in Niger and in both of them they were defeated by the same score 2–0. the Algerian Football Federation refused to postpone the matches of the championship for the Algerian clubs participating in African competitions because the FAF does not intend to end up with late matches that would disrupt the progress of a calendar allegedly tight because of the 2014 FIFA World Cup, it is for this reason that it strongly encouraged the Algerian clubs engaged in African competitions 2014 to withdraw. After winning the Ligue Professionnelle 1 title CS Constantine returned to the CAF Champions League after 20 years of absence, Qualifying for the group stage was a bit easy after winning against GAMTEL and Vipers putting him in group C with Club Africain, TP Mazembe and Ismaily. where CS Constantine ranked second to face in the quarter-finals the defending champions Espérance de Tunis to defeat 3–6 on aggregate.

- CAF Champions League: 2 appearances

1998 – First round
2018–19 – Quarter-finals

- CAF Confederation Cup: 2 appearances

2014 – Second round
2016 – Second round

=== CAF competitions stats ===
As of 13 April 2019:

CAF competitions
Competition	Seasons	Played	Won	Drawn	Lost	Goals For	Goals Against	Last season played
Champions League	2	14	6	3	5	16	14	2018–19
CAF Confederation Cup	2	10	6	0	4	14	14	2016
Total	4	24	12	3	9	30	28	

== Grounds ==
CS Constantine's home stadium is Chahid Hamlaoui Stadium which has been their home since its opening in 1976. The previous name of the stadium was Stade 17 Juin, the change was made in memory of Hamlaoui's death, a freedom fighter that died during the Algerian War. It can currently hold up to 22,968 people. The stadium has been through some renovation in the last few years.

CS Constantine play also in Ramadane Ben Abdelmalek Stadium.

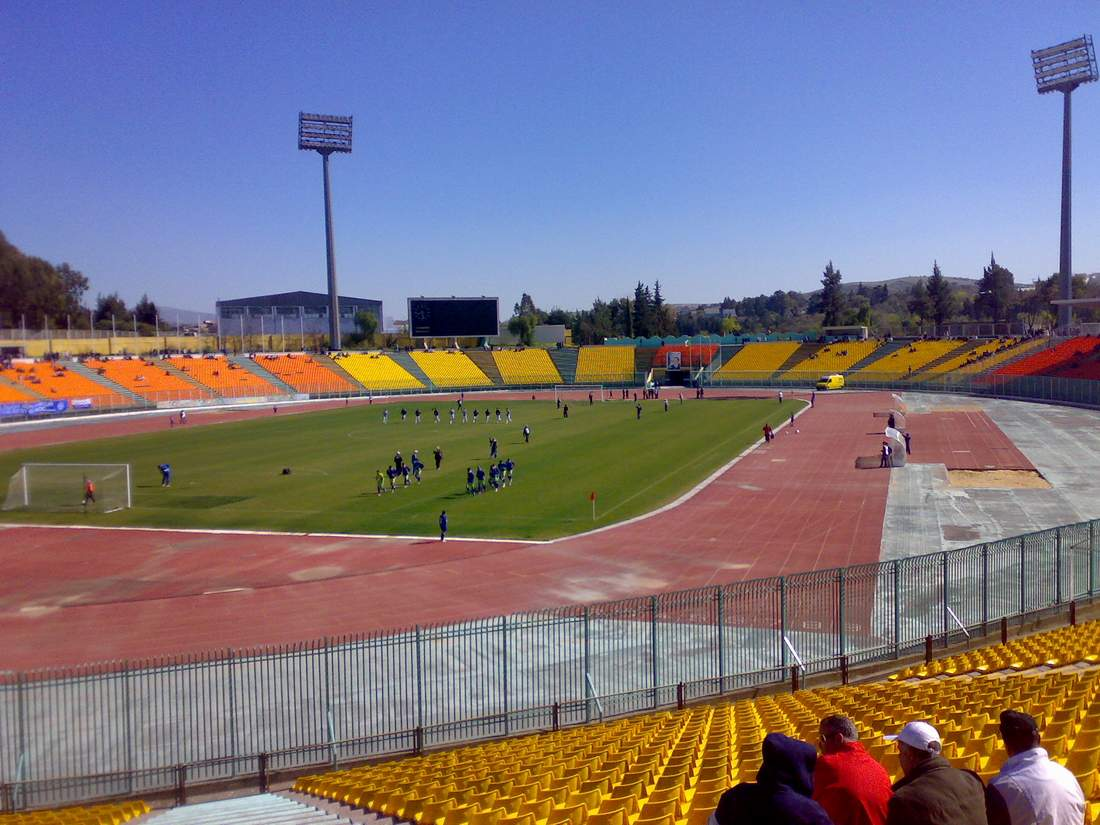
Chahid Hamlaoui Stadium

== Players ==
Algerian teams are limited to four foreign players. The squad list includes only the principal nationality of each player;

=== Current squad ===
As of 31 August 2026. Note: Flags indicate national team as defined under FIFA eligibility rules; some limited exceptions apply. Players may hold more than one non-FIFA nationality.

No.	Pos.	Nation	Player
1	GK	ALG	Zakaria Bouhalfaya
2	DF	ALG	Mohamed Belgourai
3	DF	ALG	Mounder Ayoune
4	DF	ALG	Ahmed Aït Abdesslem
5	DF	ALG	Yacine Zeghad
6	DF	COD	Johnson Atibu
7	FW	ALG	Oualaa Bouzekri
8	MF	ALG	Hadji Chekal Affari
9	FW	TOG	Yawo Agbagno
10	MF	ALG	Brahim Dib (captain)
11	MF	ALG	Mohamed Islam Bakir
12	DF	ALG	Oussama Meddahi
13	DF	ALG	Imadeddine Benmoussa
14	MF	RWA	Djihad Bizimana

No.	Pos.	Nation	Player
15	MF	ALG	Mostafa Berkane
16	GK	ALG	Oussama Mellala
17	FW	ALG	Aimen Lahmeri
18	FW	ALG	Karim Chaban
19	FW	ALG	Hamid Djaouchi
20	FW	ALG	Moslem Anatouf (on loan from MC Alger)
21	DF	ALG	Mehdi Beneddine
22	MF	ALG	Louai Bouacida
24	DF	UGA	Rogers Torach
25	DF	ALG	Miloud Rebiaï
26	MF	ALG	Nassim L'Ghoul
27	DF	ALG	Abdelmoumen Chikhi
30	GK	ALG	Abdelmalek Necir

== Personnel ==
=== Current technical staff ===
Position	Staff
Head coach	(Algeria) Amara Merouani
Assistant coach	
Goalkeeping coach	
Fitness coach	
Analyst	

== Notable players ==
Below are the notable former players who have represented CS Constantine in league and international competition since the club's foundation in 1926. To appear in the section below, a player must have played in at least 100 official matches for the club or represented the national team for which the player is eligible during his stint with CS Constantine or following his departure.

For a complete list of CS Constantine players, see Category:CS Constantine players

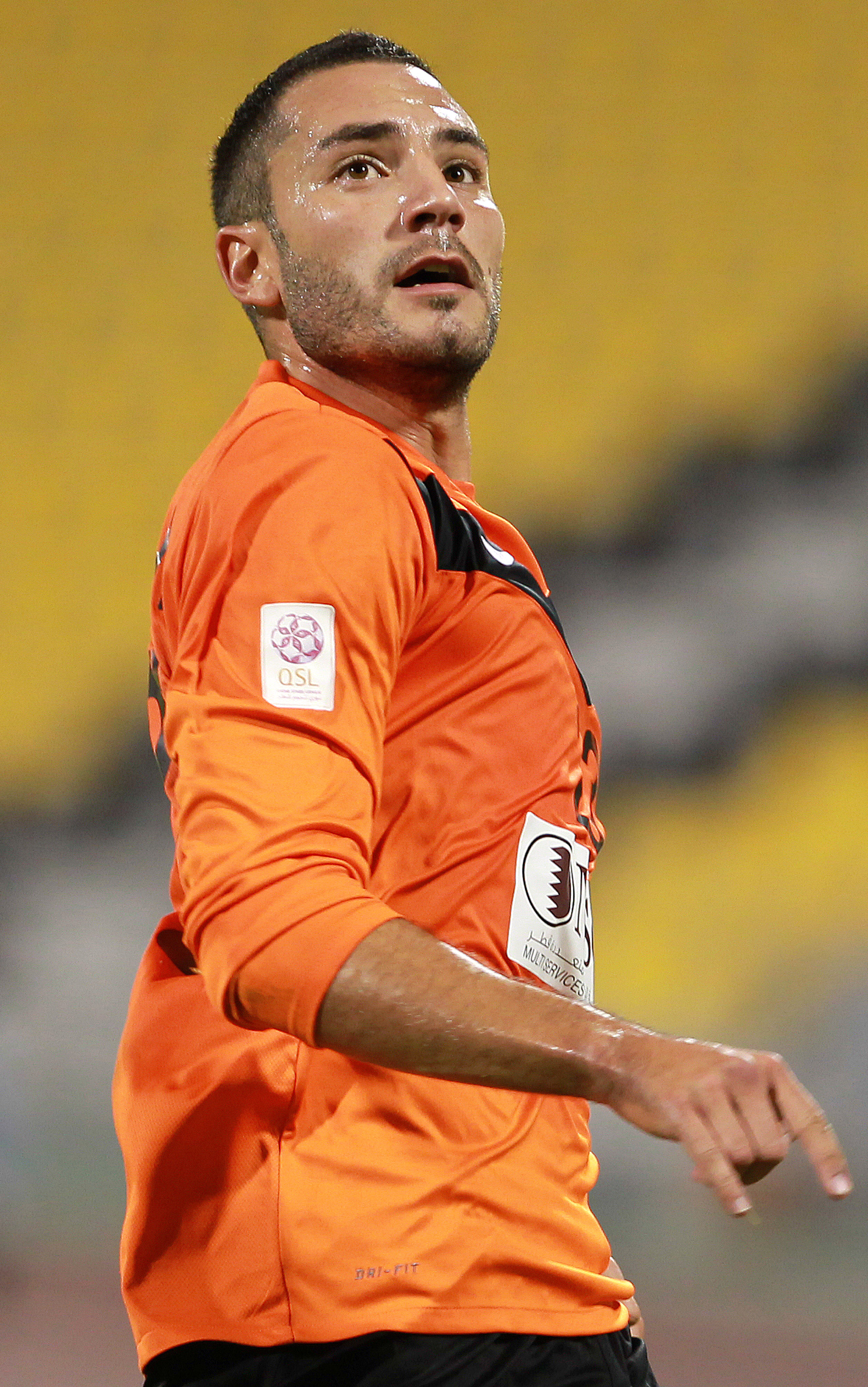
Meghni Mourad

- (Algeria) Mohamed Amroune
- (Algeria) Fayçal Badji
- (Mali) Ousmane Berthé
- (Algeria) Yacine Bezzaz
- (Algeria) Hamza Boulemdaïs
- (Algeria) Noureddine Bounaas
- (Algeria) Issaad Bourahli
- (Nigeria) Efosa Eguakun
- (Algeria) Hocine Fenier
- (Algeria) Hassen Ghoula
- (Algeria) Réda Matem
- (Algeria) Mourad Meghni
- (Algeria) Kaoua Mouloud
- (Cameroon) Gilles Ngomo
- (Algeria) Laïb Salim
- (Algeria) Cédric Si Mohamed
- (Madagascar) Paulin Voavy
- (Algeria) Mounir Zeghdoud

== Managers ==
=== List of managers ===
Information correct as of 2 July 2026. Only competitive matches are counted.

Key
*	Caretaker manager

Name	From	To	Matches	Won	Drawn	Lost	Win%
(Brazil) José Dutra dos Santos	11 July 2011	14 September 2011	1	0	1	0	0
(Algeria) Rachid Bouarrata	27 September 2011	29 January 2012	15	3	7	5	20
(Algeria) Rachid Belhout	10 February 2012	19 May 2012	16	7	4	5	43.75
(France) Roger Lemerre	14 July 2012	21 May 2013	34	16	13	5	47.06
(Italy) Diego Garzitto	30 June 2013	5 December 2013	13	5	6	2	38.46
(Algeria) Lounès Gaouaoui^{*}	6 December 2013	4 January 2014	4	3	0	1	75
(France) Bernard Simondi	5 January 2014	24 May 2014	23	8	6	9	34.78
(Italy) Diego Garzitto	7 July 2014	11 November 2014	10	4	3	3	40
(Algeria) Rachid Belhout	16 November 2014	25 February 2015	23	9	6	8	39.13
(France) Hubert Velud	2 July 2015	18 October 2015	8	3	1	4	37.5
(France) Didier Gomes Da Rosa	5 November 2015	11 September 2016	27	10	8	9	37.04
(Spain) Miguel Ángel Portugal	2 November 2016	10 December 2016	5	0	2	3	0
(Algeria) Abdelkader Amrani	1 January 2017	6 November 2018	60	27	19	14	45
(France) Denis Lavagne	17 December 2018	24 December 2019	47	20	10	17	42.55
(Algeria) Karim Khouda	30 December 2019	15 March 2020	10	5	3	2	50
(Algeria) Abdelkader Amrani	24 June 2020	21 January 2021	7	1	4	2	14.29
(Algeria) Miloud Hamdi	4 February 2021	11 August 2021	26	11	8	7	42.31
(Algeria) Chérif Hadjar	4 September 2021	15 February 2022	17	8	5	4	47.06
(Algeria) Kheïreddine Madoui	1 March 2022	26 February 2023	35	17	9	9	48.57
(Algeria) Lyamine Bougherara	27 March 2023	3 October 2023	16	6	2	8	37.5
(Algeria) Abdelkader Amrani	21 October 2023	29 June 2024	31	15	10	6	48.39
(Algeria) Kheïreddine Madoui	19 July 2024	20 June 2025	45	18	14	13	40
(Bosnia and Herzegovina) Rusmir Cviko	14 July 2025	5 December 2025	12	5	3	4	41.67
(Tunisia) Lassaad Dridi	16 December 2025	30 April 2026	19	9	6	4	47.37
(Tunisia) Mondher Kebaier	2 July 2026	18 October 2026	6	2	1	3	33.33

== Statistics ==
=== Recent seasons ===
Below, the CS Constantine season-by-season record after independence of Algeria :

Season	League									Cup	Other	Africa		Top goalscorer(s) (Note: Goals in all competitions (Algerian Ligue Professionnelle 1, Algerian Cup, League Cup, African and Super Cup) are counted.)		Ref.
Season	Division	Pos	Pts	P	W	D	L	GF	GA	Cup	Other	Africa		Name	Goals	
2014–15	Ligue 1	5th	42	30	11	9	10	32	31	R16				Hamza Boulemdaïs	15	
2015–16	Ligue 1	8th	42	30	11	9	10	26	32	R64		Confederation Cup	R2	Yacine Bezzaz	7	
2016–17	Ligue 1	9th	39	30	10	9	11	34	33	R32				Manucho	6	
2017–18	Ligue 1	1st	57	30	16	9	5	36	26	R32				Lamine Abid	16	
2018–19	Ligue 1	7th	40	30	10	10	10	30	24	SF	RU	Champions League	QF	Ismaïl Belkacemi	10	
2019–20	Ligue 1 (Note: On March 15, 2020, the Ligue de Football Professionnel (LFP) decided to halt the season due to the COVID-19 pandemic in Algeria. On July 29, 2020, the LFP declared that season is over and CR Belouizdad to be the champion, the promotion of four teams from the League 2, and scrapping the relegation for the current season.)	5th	34	22	9	7	6	32	23	R16		Arab Club Champions Cup	R1	Lamine Abid	10	
2020–21	Ligue 1	8th	57	38	15	12	11	43	31	NP	PR			Abdelhakim Amokrane	8	
2021–22	Ligue 1	5th	55	34	15	10	9	46	29	NP				Marcellin Koukpo	11	
2022–23	Ligue 1	2nd	50	30	14	8	8	39	26	R32				Brahim Dib	8	
2023–24	Ligue 1	3rd	53	30	15	8	7	46	30	SF		Champions League	R1	Brahim Dib	13	
2024–25	Ligue 1	10th	39	30	9	12	9	31	31	R64		Confederation Cup	SF	Abdennour Belhocini	10	

== Rival clubs ==
- (Algeria) MC Alger (Rivalry)
- (Algeria) JSM Skikda (Rivalry)
- (Algeria) MO Constantine (Derby)
- (Algeria) AS Khroub (Derby)
- (Algeria) ES Sétif (Derby)
- (Tunisia) Club Africain (Rivalry)
