= JS Kabylie league record by opponent =

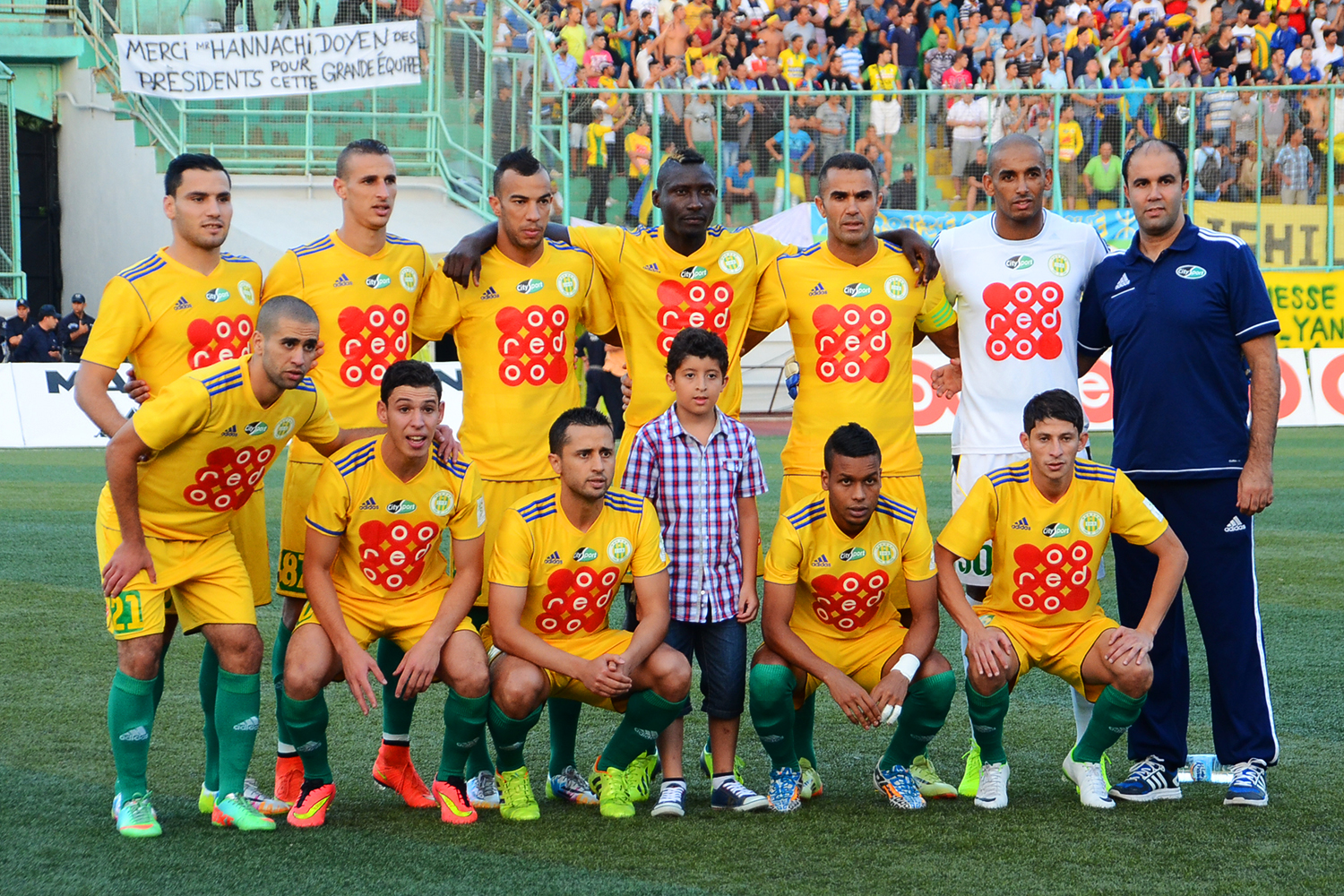
JS Kabylie players lining up before a Ligue 1 match against USM Alger at 1 November 1954 Stadium on August 23, 2014.

Jeunesse Sportive de Kabylie is an Algerian association football club based in Tizi Ouzou, Tizi Ouzou Province, that competes in the Algerian Ligue Professionnelle 1. Before independence, the team played in many degrees in Ligue d'Alger, third, second, and first division, but they had never played in Honor Division the highest degree then. The name of JS Kabylie has undergone several variations throughout its existence. Reflecting the political and cultural issues that run through the club's history, these name changes took place during the regionalist affirmation movement (1946, 1989), the Arabization policy of the country under the presidency of Houari Boumédiène (1974) and the nationalization of Algerian sport (1977). the team changed its name, one more time in 1977 to be named that time Jeunesse Electronique de Tizi-Ouzou, in 1987 the club name was changed again to Jeunesse Sportive de Tizi-Ouzou until 1989 faced with a major financial and economic crisis, the Algerian government in place in 1989 decides to abandon the 1977 reform. they recovered their old name Jeunesse Sportive de Kabylie. On March 15, 2020, the Ligue de Football Professionnel (LFP) decided to halt the season due to the COVID-19 pandemic in Algeria. On July 29, 2020, the LFP declared that season is over JS Kabylie did not play all of its matches and settled with 22 out of 30 matches of 2019–20 season.

== Key ==
- The records include the results of matches played in the Algerian Championnat National (from 1964 to 2010) and the Algerian Ligue Professionnelle 1 (since 2010).
- † Teams with this background and symbol in the "Club" column are competing in the 2024–25 Algerian Ligue Professionnelle 1 alongside JS Kabylie.
- ‡ Clubs with this background and symbol in the "Club" column are defunct.
- P = matches played; W = matches won; D = matches drawn; L = matches lost; F = Goals scored; A = Goals conceded; Win% = percentage of total matches won

== All-time league record ==
=== Ligue Professionnelle 1 ===
Statistics correct as of game against US Souf on June 14, 2024

JS Kabylie league record by opponent (2010–present)
Club	P	W	D	L	P	W	D	L	P	W	D	L	F	A	Win%	First	Last	Notes
Club	Home				Away				Total						Win%	First	Last	Notes
CR Belouizdad	14	4	3	7	14	1	4	9	28	5	7	16	23	42	17.86	2010–11	2023–24	(Note: In the 2019–20 season at Stade du 1er Novembre 1954 in Tizi Ouzou, The match was suspended at 83 minutes due to safety reasons after spectators stormed onto the pitch, CR Belouizdad award winner by 3–0..)
ES Sétif	14	3	8	3	14	2	5	7	28	5	13	10	20	29	17.86	2010–11	2023–24	
MC Oran	14	7	5	2	13	3	7	3	27	10	12	5	32	20	37.04	2010–11	2023–24	
MC Alger	13	6	4	3	14	5	4	5	27	11	8	8	37	25	40.74	2010–11	2023–24	
USM Alger	13	6	4	3	14	0	4	10	27	6	8	13	20	29	22.22	2010–11	2023–24	
CS Constantine	12	2	3	7	13	4	3	6	25	6	6	13	17	30	24	2011–12	2023–24	
JS Saoura	12	5	5	2	11	1	2	8	23	6	7	10	21	27	26.09	2012–13	2023–24	
ASO Chlef	10	6	3	1	10	2	4	4	20	8	7	5	22	17	40	2010–11	2023–24	
NA Hussein Dey	9	7	2	0	9	4	3	2	18	11	5	2	26	15	61.11	2011–12	2021–22	
USM El Harrach	8	5	1	2	8	1	2	5	16	6	3	7	11	11	37.5	2010–11	2017–18	
USM Bel Abbès	7	5	1	1	7	3	0	4	14	8	1	5	21	13	57.14	2012–13	2020–21	
CA Bordj Bou Arreridj	5	4	1	0	6	2	2	2	11	6	3	2	12	4	54.55	2010–11	2020–21	
RC Arbaâ	5	4	1	0	5	0	4	1	10	4	5	1	15	9	40	2013–14	2022–23	
WA Tlemcen	5	5	0	0	5	2	0	3	10	7	0	3	18	8	70	2010–11	2021–22	
MC El Eulma	5	3	2	0	5	2	1	2	10	5	3	2	16	13	50	2010–11	2014–15	
MO Béjaïa	5	2	3	0	5	0	3	2	10	2	6	2	8	11	20	2013–14	2018–19	
Olympique de Médéa	5	3	1	1	5	1	3	1	10	4	4	2	10	6	40	2016–17	2021–22	
US Biskra	6	2	4	0	6	1	4	1	12	3	8	1	12	10	25	2017–18	2023–24	
Paradou AC	7	3	4	0	7	2	2	3	14	5	6	3	11	8	35.71	2017–18	2023–24	
JSM Béjaïa	4	4	0	0	4	0	1	3	8	4	1	3	10	10	50	2010–11	2013–14	
USM Blida	3	0	2	1	3	2	0	1	6	2	2	2	6	5	33.33	2010–11	2017–18	
CA Batna	3	1	2	0	3	1	2	0	6	2	4	0	6	4	33.33	2011–12	2016–17	
ASM Oran	2	1	0	1	2	2	0	0	4	3	0	1	6	4	75	2014–15	2015–16	
RC Relizane	4	4	0	0	4	1	0	3	8	5	0	3	11	6	62.5	2015–16	2021–22	
AS Ain M'lila	3	2	1	0	2	0	2	0	5	2	3	0	4	2	40	2018–19	2020–21	
NC Magra	5	5	0	0	4	2	0	2	9	7	0	2	13	2	77.78	2019–20	2023–24	
CRB Aïn Fakroun	1	1	0	0	1	1	0	0	2	2	0	0	2	0	100	2013–14	2013–14	
USM Annaba	1	1	0	0	1	0	0	1	2	1	0	1	2	2	50	2010–11	2010–11	
AS Khroub	2	2	0	0	2	0	1	1	4	2	1	1	4	3	50	2010–11	2011–12	
MC Saïda	2	1	1	0	2	1	0	1	4	2	1	1	6	2	50	2010–11	2011–12	
DRB Tadjenanet	4	2	2	0	4	0	1	3	8	2	3	3	8	9	25	2015–16	2018–19	
JSM Skikda	1	1	0	0	1	0	1	0	2	1	1	0	2	1	50	2020–21	2020–21	
HB Chelghoum Laïd	2	2	0	0	2	2	0	0	4	4	0	0	7	1	100	2021–22	2022–23	
USM Khenchela	2	0	2	0	2	0	1	1	4	0	3	1	1	2	0	2022–23	2023–24	
MC El Bayadh	2	1	1	0	2	0	2	0	4	1	3	0	4	2	25	2022–23	2023–24	
US Souf	1	1	0	0	1	1	0	0	2	2	0	0	7	2	100	2023–24	2023–24	
ES Ben Aknoun	1	1	0	0	1	1	0	0	2	2	0	0	4	2	100	2023–24	2023–24	

== Overall record ==
Statistics correct as of game against MC Oran on June 14, 2024

MC Alger overall league record by competition
Competition	P	W	D	L	P	W	D	L	P	W	D	L	F	A	Win%	Seasons
Competition	Home				Away				Total						Win%	Seasons
Ligue 1 (Tier-One)	212	112	66	34	212	51	70	91	424	163	133	128	457	386	38.44	14
National 1 (Tier-One)	603	0	0	0	603	0	0	0	1206	576	337	293	1674	1011	47.76	41
National 2 (Tier-Two)	39	0	0	0	39	0	0	0	78	38	27	13	103	56	48.72	3
Inter-Régions (Tier-Three)	22	0	0	0	22	0	0	0	44	29	8	7	78	31	65.91	2
Total	876	0	0	0	876	0	0	0	1752	806	505	441	2312	1484	46	60
