= MC Alger league record by opponent =

Mouloudia Club d'Alger is an Algerian association football club based in Algiers, Algiers Province, that competes in the Algerian Ligue Professionnelle 1. On August 7, 1921, Hamoud Aouf filed the statutes of Mouloudia Club Algérois. At its birth, MCA chose to join the Fédération sportive indépendante nord africaine (FSINA). During the colonial period, Mouloudia d'Alger played 20 seasons in Honor Division the highest degree, during which they won the Ligue d'Alger title twice and Forconi Cup twice. Responding to the call for a boycott launched by the National Liberation Front, MC Alger, like all other Muslim clubs, stopped participating in colonial competitions in 1956.

After independence, MC Alger played in the Ligue 2 and Ligue 1 the highest degree. In 1977, a sports reform was carried out as intended by the Ministry of Youth and Sports, in order to give the elite clubs a good financial base allowing them to structure themselves professionally. Mouloudia d'Alger is financed by Sonatrach, so the new name of the club is Mouloudia Pétroliers d'Alger. in 1986 the club name was changed again to Mouloudia Chaâbia d’Alger until 1989, faced with a major financial and economic crisis, the Algerian government in place in 1989 decides to abandon the 1977 reform. On March 15, 2020, the Ligue de Football Professionnel (LFP) decided to halt the season due to the COVID-19 pandemic in Algeria. On July 29, 2020, the LFP declared that season is over MC Alger did not play all of its matches and settled with 21 out of 30 matches of 2019–20 season.

== Key ==
- The records include the results of matches played in the Algerian Championnat National (from 1964 to 2010) and the Algerian Ligue Professionnelle 1 (since 2010).
- † Teams with this background and symbol in the "Club" column are competing in the 2024–25 Algerian Ligue Professionnelle 1 alongside MC Alger.
- ‡ Clubs with this background and symbol in the "Club" column are defunct.
- P = matches played; W = matches won; D = matches drawn; L = matches lost; F = Goals scored; A = Goals conceded; Win% = percentage of total matches won

== All-time league record ==
=== Ligue Professionnelle 1 ===
Statistics correct as of game against MC Oran on June 14, 2024

MC Alger league record by opponent (2010–present)
Club	P	W	D	L	P	W	D	L	P	W	D	L	F	A	Win%	First	Last	Notes
Club	Home				Away				Total						Win%	First	Last	Notes
MC Oran	14	9	4	1	14	2	8	4	28	11	12	5	33	23	39.29	2010–11	2023–24	
CR Belouizdad	14	5	9	0	13	1	4	8	27	6	13	8	18	22	22.22	2010–11	2023–24	
USM Alger	13	6	3	4	14	2	8	4	27	8	11	8	24	29	29.63	2010–11	2023–24	(Note: In the 2020–21 season MC Alger won by penalty 3–0 due to the absence of USM Alger. The decision has been appealed to the Court of Arbitration for Sport. On August 28, 2020, after postponing several times the final decision was made without appeal, which is to return the three points to USM Alger and repeat the match. however due to the COVID-19 pandemic in Algeria the match was canceled.)
ES Sétif	14	7	4	3	13	3	3	7	27	10	7	10	35	35	37.04	2010–11	2023–24	
JS Kabylie	14	5	4	5	13	3	4	6	27	8	8	11	25	37	29.63	2010–11	2023–24	
CS Constantine	12	8	4	0	13	3	3	7	25	11	7	7	26	20	44	2011–12	2023–24	
JS Saoura	12	7	4	1	12	2	3	7	24	9	7	8	24	22	37.5	2012–13	2023–24	
NA Hussein Dey	9	4	4	1	8	1	3	4	17	5	7	5	23	18	29.41	2011–12	2021–22	
ASO Chlef	9	4	3	2	10	3	4	3	19	7	7	5	22	17	36.84	2010–11	2023–24	
USM El Harrach	8	4	2	2	8	3	0	5	16	7	2	7	12	13	43.75	2010–11	2017–18	(Note: In the 2012–13 season, in the last round, MC Alger refused to go to the Stade 1er Novembre 1954 to play against USM El Harrach. According to Article 84 of the Disciplinary Code of the Algerian Football Federation (FAF), “Match lost by penalty (3–0). Deduction of (03) points, fine of one million dinars (1,000,000 dinars) for the club.)
USM Bel Abbès	6	4	0	2	7	1	1	5	13	5	1	7	19	20	38.46	2012–13	2020–21	
CA Bordj Bou Arreridj	6	4	2	0	6	2	1	3	12	6	3	3	13	9	50	2010–11	2020–21	
Paradou AC	6	4	2	0	7	4	2	1	13	8	4	1	22	9	61.54	2017–18	2023–24	
RC Arbaâ	5	3	1	1	5	0	2	3	10	3	3	4	10	11	40	2013–14	2022–23	
WA Tlemcen	5	4	0	1	5	4	0	1	10	8	0	2	18	7	80	2010–11	2021–22	
MC El Eulma	5	3	2	0	5	0	2	3	10	3	4	3	12	7	30	2010–11	2014–15	
MO Béjaïa	5	3	2	0	5	1	2	2	10	4	4	2	12	9	40	2013–14	2018–19	
Olympique de Médéa	5	3	2	0	5	1	3	1	10	4	5	1	13	5	40	2016–17	2021–22	
US Biskra	5	2	3	0	6	2	2	2	11	4	5	2	10	5	36.36	2017–18	2023–24	
AS Khroub	2	1	1	0	2	1	0	1	4	2	1	1	7	5	50	2010–11	2011–12	
USM Annaba	1	0	1	0	1	0	0	1	2	0	1	1	3	4	0	2010–11	2010–11	
JSM Béjaïa	4	2	2	0	4	1	2	1	8	3	4	1	9	6	37.5	2010–11	2013–14	
MC Saïda	2	1	1	0	2	0	1	1	4	1	2	1	3	2	25	2010–11	2011–12	
USM Blida	3	2	1	0	3	1	0	2	6	3	1	2	7	4	50	2010–11	2017–18	
CA Batna	3	3	0	0	3	2	0	1	6	5	0	1	7	5	83.33	2011–12	2016–17	
CRB Aïn Fakroun	1	1	0	0	1	0	0	1	2	1	0	1	3	3	50	2013–14	2013–14	
ASM Oran	2	1	1	0	2	0	1	1	2	0	1	1	3	2	25	2014–15	2015–16	
RC Relizane	4	3	1	0	4	2	1	1	8	5	2	1	18	8	62.5	2015–16	2021–22	
DRB Tadjenanet	4	3	0	1	4	2	2	0	8	5	2	1	13	7	62.5	2015–16	2018–19	
AS Ain M'lila	3	1	2	0	3	0	1	2	6	1	3	2	9	10	16.67	2018–19	2020–21	
NC Magra	5	5	0	0	5	1	3	1	10	6	3	1	18	7	60	2019–20	2023–24	
JSM Skikda	1	1	0	0	1	0	0	1	2	1	0	1	3	1	50	2020–21	2020–21	
HB Chelghoum Laïd	2	1	1	0	2	1	0	1	4	2	1	1	3	3	50	2021–22	2022–23	
USM Khenchela	2	2	0	0	2	0	1	1	4	2	1	1	5	3	50	2022–23	2023–24	
MC El Bayadh	2	2	0	0	2	0	1	1	4	2	1	1	3	1	50	2022–23	2023–24	
ES Ben Aknoun	1	1	0	0	1	1	0	0	2	2	0	0	7	2	100	2023–24	2023–24	
US Souf	1	1	0	0	1	1	0	0	2	2	0	0	7	3	100	2023–24	2023–24	

== Overall record ==
Statistics correct as of game against MC Oran on June 14, 2024

MC Alger overall league record by competition
Competition	P	W	D	L	P	W	D	L	P	W	D	L	F	A	Win%	Seasons
Competition	Home				Away				Total						Win%	Seasons
Ligue 1 (Tier-One)	211	121	66	24	212	51	68	93	423	172	134	117	466	355	40.66	14
National 1 (Tier-One)	15	7	3	5	15	2	5	8	30	8	8	14	39	46	26.67	1
National 2 (Tier-Two)	50	35	12	3	50	24	16	10	100	59	28	13	187	80	59	4
Total	0	0	0	0	0	0	0	0	0	0	0	0	0	0	100	19
