= ES Sétif league record by opponent =

Entente Sportive Sétifienne is an Algerian association football club based in Sétif, Sétif Province, that competes in the Algerian Ligue Professionnelle 1, was founded in 1958 as Entente Sportive de Sétif. However, following the Arabization of club names in 1970, the team was renamed Wifak Riadhi Staifi (WRS). With the sports reforms of 1977, the club was sponsored by the national hydrocarbons company Sonatrach, leading to another name change: Entente Pétrolière de Sétif (EPS). In 1984, the club changed sponsorship again, this time adopting the national plastics company, which resulted in another renaming to Entente Plastique de Sétif (EPS). In 1989 faced with a major financial and economic crisis, the Algerian government in place decides to abandon the 1977 reform., all Algerian clubs changed their names, and the team became Entente Sportive de Sétif. Finally, in 2012, the newly elected club president at the time, Hassen Hammar, decided to restore the club's original name from its founding in 1958 Entente Sportive Sétifienne. On March 15, 2020, the Ligue de Football Professionnel (LFP) decided to halt the season due to the COVID-19 pandemic in Algeria. On July 29, 2020, the LFP declared that season is over ES Sétif did not play all of its matches and settled with 21 out of 30 matches of 2019–20 season.

== Key ==
- The records include the results of matches played in the Algerian Championnat National (from 1964 to 2010) and the Algerian Ligue Professionnelle 1 (since 2010).
- † Teams with this background and symbol in the "Club" column are competing in the 2024–25 Algerian Ligue Professionnelle 1 alongside ES Sétif.
- ‡ Clubs with this background and symbol in the "Club" column are defunct.
- P = matches played; W = matches won; D = matches drawn; L = matches lost; F = Goals scored; A = Goals conceded; Win% = percentage of total matches won

== All-time league record ==
=== Ligue Professionnelle 1 ===
Statistics correct as of game against CS Constantine on June 14, 2024

ES Sétif league record by opponent (2010–present)
Club	P	W	D	L	P	W	D	L	P	W	D	L	F	A	Win%	First	Last	Notes
Club	Home				Away				Total						Win%	First	Last	Notes
JS Kabylie	14	7	5	2	14	3	8	3	28	10	13	5	29	20	35.71	2010–11	2023–24	
CR Belouizdad	13	8	3	2	14	2	4	8	27	10	7	10	25	27	37.04	2010–11	2023–24	
MC Alger	13	7	3	3	14	3	4	7	27	10	7	10	35	35	37.04	2010–11	2023–24	
ASO Chlef	10	5	3	2	9	2	2	5	19	7	5	7	20	18	36.84	2010–11	2023–24	
MC Oran	0	0	0	0	0	0	0	0	0	0	0	0	0	0	100	2010–11	2023–24	
USM Alger	0	0	0	0	0	0	0	0	0	0	0	0	0	0	100	2010–11	2023–24	
CS Constantine	0	0	0	0	0	0	0	0	0	0	0	0	0	0	100	2011–12	2023–24	
JS Saoura	0	0	0	0	0	0	0	0	0	0	0	0	0	0	100	2012–13	2023–24	
NA Hussein Dey	0	0	0	0	0	0	0	0	0	0	0	0	0	0	100	2011–12	2021–22	
USM El Harrach	0	0	0	0	0	0	0	0	0	0	0	0	0	0	100	2010–11	2017–18	
USM Bel Abbès	0	0	0	0	0	0	0	0	0	0	0	0	0	0	100	2012–13	2020–21	
CA Bordj Bou Arreridj	0	0	0	0	0	0	0	0	0	0	0	0	0	0	100	2010–11	2020–21	
Paradou AC	0	0	0	0	0	0	0	0	0	0	0	0	0	0	100	2017–18	2023–24	
RC Arbaâ	5	4	0	1	5	1	1	3	10	5	1	4	13	11	50	2013–14	2022–23	
WA Tlemcen	5	5	0	0	5	2	1	2	10	7	1	2	18	8	70	2010–11	2021–22	
MC El Eulma	5	2	3	0	5	3	1	1	10	5	4	1	13	7	50	2010–11	2014–15	
MO Béjaïa	5	3	2	0	5	1	1	3	10	4	3	3	13	11	40	2013–14	2018–19	
Olympique de Médéa	5	3	2	0	5	2	2	1	10	5	4	3	15	7	50	2016–17	2021–22	
US Biskra	6	5	1	0	6	1	3	2	12	6	4	2	21	10	50	2017–18	2023–24	
AS Khroub	2	1	1	0	2	0	2	0	4	1	3	0	8	6	25	2010–11	2011–12	
USM Annaba	1	1	0	0	1	0	0	1	2	1	0	1	2	3	50	2010–11	2010–11	
JSM Béjaïa	4	2	0	2	4	2	0	2	8	4	0	4	14	10	50	2010–11	2013–14	
MC Saïda	2	2	0	0	2	1	1	0	4	3	1	0	8	3	75	2010–11	2011–12	
USM Blida	3	1	2	0	3	1	1	1	6	2	3	1	11	6	33.33	2010–11	2017–18	
CA Batna	3	3	0	0	3	2	0	1	6	5	0	1	14	3	83.33	2011–12	2016–17	
CRB Aïn Fakroun	1	1	0	0	1	1	0	0	2	2	0	0	2	0	100	2013–14	2013–14	
ASM Oran	2	2	0	0	2	1	0	1	4	3	0	1	10	4	75	2014–15	2015–16	
RC Relizane	4	2	2	0	4	1	3	0	8	3	5	0	15	5	37.5	2015–16	2021–22	
DRB Tadjenanet	4	3	1	0	4	0	0	4	8	3	1	4	7	8	37.5	2015–16	2018–19	
AS Ain M'lila	3	3	0	0	2	0	0	2	5	3	0	2	13	3	60	2018–19	2020–21	
NC Magra	5	3	1	1	5	4	1	0	10	7	2	1	14	4	70	2019–20	2023–24	
JSM Skikda	1	1	0	0	1	1	0	0	2	2	0	0	3	0	100	2020–21	2020–21	
HB Chelghoum Laïd	2	2	0	0	2	1	0	1	4	3	0	1	9	1	75	2021–22	2022–23	
USM Khenchela	2	1	0	1	2	0	0	2	4	1	0	3	3	5	25	2022–23	2023–24	
MC El Bayadh	2	1	0	1	2	0	0	2	4	1	0	3	3	8	25	2022–23	2023–24	
ES Ben Aknoun	1	0	1	0	1	0	0	1	2	0	1	1	1	2	0	2023–24	2023–24	
US Souf	1	1	0	0	1	1	0	0	2	2	0	0	6	1	100	2023–24	2023–24	

== Overall record ==
Statistics correct as of game against CS Constantine on June 14, 2024

ES Sétif overall league record by competition
Competition	P	W	D	L	P	W	D	L	P	W	D	L	F	A	Win%	Seasons
Competition	Home				Away				Total						Win%	Seasons
Ligue 1 (Tier-One)	212	0	0	0	212	0	0	0	424	197	108	119	591	393	46.46	14
National 1 (Tier-One)	606	0	0	0	606	0	0	0	1212	472	351	388	0	0	38.94	42
National 2 (Tier-Two)	62	0	0	0	62	0	0	0	124	73	31	20	212	97	58.87	4
Total	880	0	0	0	880	0	0	0	1760	742	490	527	0	0	42.16	60
