= CR Belouizdad league record by opponent =

Chabab Riadhi Belouizdad is an Algerian association football club based in Belouizdad, Algiers Province, that competes in the Algerian Ligue Professionnelle 1, was founded on July 15, 1962, as Chabab Riadhi de Belcourt. CR Belouizdad is the result of the merger of two former Belcourt clubs which existed before independence, Widad Riadhi Belcourt founded on January 31, 1948, and Belcourt Athletic Club founded on March 8, 1952. The team changed its name in 1977 to be named that time Chabab mécanique de Belcourt until 1989 faced with a major financial and economic crisis, the Algerian government in place in 1989 decides to abandon the 1977 reform. they recovered their old name Chabab Riadhi de Belcourt. On October 13, 1992, the name of the city was changed from Belcourt to Belouizdad, and the club's name became Chabab Riadhi de Belouizdad. On March 15, 2020, the Ligue de Football Professionnel (LFP) decided to halt the season due to the COVID-19 pandemic in Algeria. On July 29, 2020, the LFP declared that season is over CR Belouizdad did not play all of its matches and settled with 21 out of 30 matches of 2019–20 season.

== Key ==
- The records include the results of matches played in the Algerian Championnat National (from 1964 to 2010) and the Algerian Ligue Professionnelle 1 (since 2010).
- † Teams with this background and symbol in the "Club" column are competing in the 2024–25 Algerian Ligue Professionnelle 1 alongside CR Belouizdad.
- ‡ Clubs with this background and symbol in the "Club" column are defunct.
- P = matches played; W = matches won; D = matches drawn; L = matches lost; F = Goals scored; A = Goals conceded; Win% = percentage of total matches won

== All-time league record ==
=== Ligue Professionnelle 1 ===
Statistics correct as of game against JS Saoura on June 14, 2024

CR Belouizdad league record by opponent (2010–present)
Club	P	W	D	L	P	W	D	L	P	W	D	L	F	A	Win%	First	Last	Notes
Club	Home				Away				Total						Win%	First	Last	Notes
JS Kabylie	14	9	4	1	14	7	3	4	28	16	7	5	42	23	57.14	2010–11	2023–24	(Note: In the 2019–20 season at Stade du 1er Novembre 1954 in Tizi Ouzou, The match was suspended at 83 minutes due to safety reasons after spectators stormed onto the pitch, CR Belouizdad award winner by 3–0.)
USM Alger	13	4	4	5	14	2	2	10	27	6	6	15	21	36	25.93	2010–11	2023–24	
MC Alger	13	8	4	1	14	0	9	5	27	8	13	6	22	18	29.63	2010–11	2023–24	
ES Sétif	14	8	4	2	13	2	3	8	27	10	7	10	27	25	37.04	2010–11	2023–24	
MC Oran	14	7	6	1	13	4	5	4	27	11	11	5	38	22	40.74	2010–11	2023–24	
CS Constantine	12	5	6	1	13	1	5	7	25	6	10	8	22	24	24	2011–12	2023–24	
JS Saoura	12	9	3	0	11	4	4	3	23	13	7	3	28	16	56.52	2012–13	2023–24	
ASO Chlef	10	9	0	1	10	4	2	4	20	13	2	5	29	21	65	2010–11	2023–24	
NA Hussein Dey	9	6	2	1	9	5	3	1	18	11	5	2	28	14	61.11	2011–12	2021–22	
USM El Harrach	8	3	2	3	8	1	3	4	16	4	5	7	14	18	25	2010–11	2017–18	
Paradou AC	6	3	3	0	7	3	4	0	13	6	7	0	13	5	46.15	2017–18	2023–24	
US Biskra	6	5	1	0	6	1	3	2	12	6	4	2	17	8	50	2017–18	2023–24	
USM Bel Abbès	6	3	2	1	7	3	2	2	13	6	4	3	11	5	46.15	2012–13	2020–21	
CA Bordj Bou Arreridj	6	5	1	0	5	1	2	2	11	6	3	2	18	8	54.55	2010–11	2020–21	
RC Arbaâ	5	2	3	0	5	2	1	2	10	4	4	2	14	9	40	2013–14	2022–23	
WA Tlemcen	5	3	2	0	5	1	2	2	10	4	4	2	11	9	40	2010–11	2021–22	
MC El Eulma	5	3	2	0	5	1	2	2	10	4	4	2	12	10	40	2010–11	2014–15	
MO Béjaïa	5	3	0	2	4	0	1	3	9	3	1	5	11	11	33.33	2013–14	2018–19	
Olympique de Médéa	5	2	2	1	5	1	3	1	10	3	5	2	8	6	30	2016–17	2021–22	
JSM Béjaïa	4	1	0	3	4	0	1	3	8	1	1	6	6	12	12.5	2010–11	2013–14	
USM Blida	3	1	2	0	3	1	2	0	6	2	4	0	7	5	33.33	2010–11	2017–18	
CA Batna	3	2	0	1	3	2	1	0	6	4	1	1	8	4	66.67	2011–12	2016–17	
ASM Oran	2	2	0	0	2	1	1	0	4	3	1	0	8	3	75	2014–15	2015–16	
RC Relizane	4	3	1	0	4	3	0	1	8	6	1	1	22	5	75	2015–16	2021–22	
AS Ain M'lila	3	1	1	1	2	0	2	0	5	1	3	1	7	6	20	2018–19	2020–21	(Note: In the 2018–19 season at Stade 20 Août 1955 in Belouizdad, for the first match of the 2018–19 Ligue 1 against AS Ain M'lila, the match referee waited the 15 minutes of the regulation time before noting the absence of CR Belouizdad due to the non-payment of registration fees for the 2018–19 season as well as the players' insurance costs. AS Ain M'lila award winner by 3–0.)
NC Magra	5	4	0	1	5	0	4	1	10	4	4	2	9	6	40	2019–20	2023–24	
CRB Aïn Fakroun	1	0	1	0	1	1	0	0	2	1	1	0	2	0	50	2013–14	2013–14	
USM Annaba	1	1	0	0	1	0	0	1	2	1	0	1	2	1	50	2010–11	2010–11	
AS Khroub	2	1	1	0	2	0	2	0	4	1	3	0	5	2	25	2010–11	2011–12	
MC Saïda	2	2	0	0	2	0	0	2	4	2	0	2	5	5	50	2010–11	2011–12	
DRB Tadjenanet	4	3	0	1	4	2	1	1	8	5	1	2	10	7	62.5	2015–16	2018–19	
JSM Skikda	1	1	0	0	1	1	0	0	2	2	0	0	9	2	100	2020–21	2020–21	
HB Chelghoum Laïd	2	1	0	1	2	1	1	0	4	2	1	1	5	2	50	2021–22	2022–23	
USM Khenchela	2	1	0	1	2	0	0	2	4	1	0	3	5	9	25	2022–23	2023–24	
MC El Bayadh	2	2	0	0	2	1	0	1	4	3	0	1	6	3	75	2022–23	2023–24	
US Souf	1	1	0	0	1	1	0	0	2	2	0	0	5	0	100	2023–24	2023–24	
ES Ben Aknoun	1	1	0	0	1	0	1	0	2	1	1	0	2	1	50	2023–24	2023–24	

== Overall record ==
Statistics correct as of game against JS Saoura on June 14, 2024

CR Belouizdad overall league record by competition
Competition	P	W	D	L	P	W	D	L	P	W	D	L	F	A	Win%	Seasons
Competition	Home				Away				Total						Win%	Seasons
Ligue 1 (Tier-One)	211	125	57	29	212	58	76	78	423	183	133	107	508	361	43.16	14
National 1 (Tier-One)	651	0	0	0	651	0	0	0	1302	518	377	407	1636	1322	39.78	45
National 2 (Tier-Two)	16	14	2	0	16	5	8	3	32	17	10	5	38	16	53.13	1
Total	878	0	0	0	879	0	0	0	1757	718	520	519	2182	1699	40.87	60
