= ASO Chlef league record by opponent =

Association Sportive Olympique de Chlef is an Algerian association football club based in Chlef, Chlef Province, that competes in the Algerian Ligue Professionnelle 1. The club was formed in Orléansville in 1947 as Association Sportive d'Orléansville, before it was renamed Asnam Sportive Olympique in 1962. The team changed its name one more time in 1977 to be named Olympique El Asnam, two years later to the name Distribution Nouvelle pour Construction d'El Asnam, Three years later after changing the name of the city to Chlef Saad Olympique. In 1989 faced with a major financial and economic crisis, the Algerian government in place in 1989 decides to abandon the 1977 reform. During the colonial period, the team played in many degrees in Ligue d'Alger, third, second, and first division, but they had never played in Honor Division the highest degree then. After independence, ASO Chlef played in the Inter-Régions, Ligue 2 and Ligue 1 the highest degree.

In the 1980–81 season after 6 matches and due to the 1980 El Asnam earthquake on October 10, that devastated the entire city of El Asnam. DNC Asnam is forced to forfeit, given these exceptional circumstances, the club is not relegated to D2. On March 15, 2020, the Ligue de Football Professionnel (LFP) decided to halt the season due to the COVID-19 pandemic in Algeria. On July 29, 2020, the LFP declared that season is over ASO Chlef did not play all of its matches and settled with 21 out of 30 matches of 2019–20 season.

== Key ==
- The records include the results of matches played in the Algerian Championnat National (from 1964 to 2010) and the Algerian Ligue Professionnelle 1 (since 2010).
- † Teams with this background and symbol in the "Club" column are competing in the 2023–24 Algerian Ligue Professionnelle 1 alongside ASO Chlef.
- ‡ Clubs with this background and symbol in the "Club" column are defunct.
- P = matches played; W = matches won; D = matches drawn; L = matches lost; F = Goals scored; A = Goals conceded; Win% = percentage of total matches won

== All-time league record ==
=== Algerian Ligue Professionnelle 1 ===
Statistics correct as of game against USM Khenchela on June 14, 2024

ASO Chlef league record by opponent (2010–present)
Club	P	W	D	L	P	W	D	L	P	W	D	L	F	A	Win%	First	Last	Notes
Club	Home				Away				Total						Win%	First	Last	Notes
JS Kabylie	10	4	4	2	10	1	3	6	20	5	7	8	17	22	25	2010–11	2023–24	
CR Belouizdad	10	4	2	4	10	1	0	9	20	5	2	13	21	29	25	2010–11	2023–24	
MC Oran	9	7	2	0	10	1	3	6	19	8	5	6	21	16	42.11	2010–11	2023–24	
MC Alger	10	3	4	3	9	2	3	4	19	5	7	7	17	22	26.32	2010–11	2023–24	
ES Sétif	9	5	2	2	10	2	3	5	19	7	5	7	18	20	36.84	2010–11	2023–24	
USM Alger	9	6	2	1	10	1	3	6	19	7	5	7	16	23	36.84	2010–11	2023–24	
CS Constantine	9	5	3	1	8	1	2	5	17	6	5	6	19	21	35.29	2011–12	2023–24	
JS Saoura	7	2	3	2	8	1	6	1	15	3	9	3	17	21	20	2012–13	2023–24	
NA Hussein Dey	5	1	4	0	5	2	1	2	10	3	5	2	9	5	30	2011–12	2021–22	
USM El Harrach	5	3	0	2	5	3	1	1	10	6	1	3	12	7	60	2010–11	2014–15	
US Biskra	5	5	0	0	5	0	0	5	10	5	0	5	8	11	50	2019–20	2023–24	
Paradou AC	5	1	3	1	5	2	1	2	10	3	4	3	12	12	30	2019–20	2023–24	
NC Magra	5	0	3	2	5	0	1	4	10	0	4	6	7	14	0	2019–20	2023–24	
MC El Eulma	5	3	1	1	5	1	1	3	10	4	2	4	18	11	40	2010–11	2014–15	
WA Tlemcen	5	5	0	0	5	2	1	2	10	7	1	2	20	6	70	2010–11	2021–22	
CA Bordj Bou Arreridj	5	3	1	1	4	2	0	2	9	5	1	3	8	4	55.56	2010–11	2020–21	
MC El Bayadh	2	1	1	0	2	0	0	2	4	1	1	2	2	4	25	2022–23	2023–24	
USM Khenchela	2	2	0	0	2	0	0	2	4	2	0	2	7	5	50	2022–23	2023–24	
CA Batna	2	0	2	0	2	0	1	1	4	0	3	1	3	5	0	2011–12	2012–13	
JSM Béjaïa	4	4	0	0	4	0	2	2	8	4	2	2	11	9	50	2010–11	2013–14	
USM Blida	1	1	0	0	1	1	0	0	2	2	0	0	4	0	100	2010–11	2010–11	
MC Saïda	2	1	1	0	2	0	1	1	4	1	2	1	2	3	25	2010–11	2011–12	
AS Khroub	2	2	0	0	2	1	0	1	4	3	0	1	7	1	75	2010–11	2011–12	
USM Annaba	1	1	0	0	1	0	1	0	2	1	1	0	4	0	50	2010–11	2010–11	
USM Bel Abbès	4	2	1	1	3	1	1	1	7	3	2	2	9	6	42.86	2012–13	2020–21	
RC Arbaâ	4	3	1	0	4	1	2	1	8	4	3	1	11	4	50	2013–14	2022–23	
MO Béjaïa	2	1	1	0	2	0	2	0	4	1	3	0	2	0	25	2013–14	2014–15	
CRB Aïn Fakroun	1	0	1	0	1	1	0	0	2	1	1	0	4	1	50	2013–14	2013–14	
ASM Oran	1	0	1	0	1	0	0	1	2	0	1	1	1	3	0	2014–15	2014–15	
AS Ain M'lila	1	0	0	1	2	0	1	1	3	0	1	2	2	4	0	2019–20	2020–21	
JSM Skikda	1	1	0	0	1	1	0	0	2	2	0	0	5	1	100	2020–21	2020–21	
Olympique de Médéa	2	1	0	1	2	1	0	1	4	2	0	2	4	4	50	2020–21	2021–22	
RC Relizane	2	2	0	0	2	1	1	0	4	3	1	0	8	5	75	2020–21	2021–22	
HB Chelghoum Laïd	2	2	0	0	2	0	1	1	4	2	1	1	5	1	50	2021–22	2022–23	
ES Ben Aknoun	1	1	0	0	1	0	1	0	2	1	1	0	4	3	50	2023–24	2023–24	
US Souf	1	1	0	0	1	1	0	0	2	2	0	0	4	0	100	2023–24	2023–24	

== Overall record ==
Statistics correct as of game against US Biskra on June 14, 2024

ASO Chlef overall league record by competition
Competition	P	W	D	L	P	W	D	L	P	W	D	L	F	A	Win%
Competition	Home				Away				Total						Win%
Ligue 1 (Tier-One)	152	84	44	24	151	31	41	79	303	115	85	103	340	302	37.95
National 1 (Tier-One)	0	0	0	0	0	0	0	0	0	0	0	0	0	0	100
National 2 (Tier-Two)	0	0	0	0	0	0	0	0	0	0	0	0	0	0	100
Total	0	0	0	0	0	0	0	0	0	0	0	0	0	0	100
