= 2023–24 ES Sétif season =

ES Sétif
2023–24 season
- Owner: Sonelgaz (from 27 July 2023)
- President: Abdelhakim Serrar (until 27 July 2023); Abdelhamid Rais (from 6 August 2023)
- Head coach: Abdelkader Amrani (from 6 August 2023) (until 12 September 2023); Franck Dumas (from 13 September 2023) (until 9 February 2024); Ammar Souayah (from 10 February 2024)
- Stadium: 8 May 1945 Stadium
- Ligue 1: 5th
- Algerian Cup: Round of 32
- Top goalscorer: League: Aymen Lahmeri (9 goals); All: Aymen Lahmeri (9 goals)
- Biggest win: ES Sétif 3–0 US Souf
- Biggest defeat: MC Oran 4–1 ES Sétif
Home colours	Away colours	Third colours

The 2023–24 season, is ES Sétif's 54th season and the club's 22nd consecutive season in the top flight of Algerian football. In addition to the domestic league, ES Sétif are participating in the Algerian Cup.

== Review ==
I hope that this project will be done as soon as possible, confided the first manager of the Sonelgaz group. I am the first supporter of ES Sétif. Congratulations to the wilaya of Sétif. We hope for many titles in the future. The team has a game to play on Wednesday and we hope they will win it to be on the podium.

— Statement by the CEO of Sonelgaz regarding the purchase of the majority of shares in ES Setif.

On July 20, 2023, The members of the board of directors of the ESS Black Eagles company published a press release to announce that the contracts signed recently by Abdelhakim Serrar were cancelled. The reason is that all the members of the council recently submitted their collective resignation as part of the takeover of the club by the public company Sonelgaz, the signatures of Kheireddine Madoui in particular as well as the other contracts in negotiation are declared null and void. Sonelgaz made a point of providing some clarifications concerning the operation to buy back the capital of SSPA/ES Sétif in a recent press release. Sonelgaz will announce the acquisition once the paperwork is signed. A roadmap will also be communicated to the public. The latter will answer questions from supporters about the future of the club.

On July 27, ESS Black Eagles held an extraordinary general meeting to ratify the resignation of the Board of Directors, during which Serrar submitted his resignation, so that all the club's shares became the property of Sonelgaz. On August 6, 2023, ES Setif contracted Abdelkader Amrani as a new coach. In addition, several former ESS players have been appointed to several positions. Malik Zorgane will supervise the opposing teams while Mourad Delhoum will be responsible for prospecting young players. Isaad Bourahli has been appointed deputy technical director, while Derradji Bendjaballah has been appointed to the club's board of directors. On August 20, The new owner of ES Sétif organized a grand ceremony to present the players for the 2023–24 season. This ceremony organized at the Ecole supérieure d'Hôtellerie et Restauration of Aïn Benian, in the presence of the CEO of Sonelgaz. Among the 15 players recruited during this off-season, ES Sétif got their hands on two Malian players defender Moriba Diarra and striker Souleymane Coulibaly.

ES Sétif continue its summer preparation at the International Sports Complex Ain Drahem in Tunisia. This second internship began on August 22 and end on September 6. Three days before the first match in Ligue 1 ESS Black Eagles announced the termination of the contract binding it to Amrani and all of its technical staff, disagreement over some points of internal regulations is the reason behind this departure. On September 13, ES Setif signed Franck Dumas as their new coach, with Slimane Raho as his assistant. The chief executive officer (CEO) of Sonelgaz held a working meeting on December 7, 2023, which brought together the technical and administrative teams of ES Sétif. During this meeting it was a question of listening to the concerns of the administrative and technical staff. The CEO of Sonelgaz announced the start of work on the club's sports facilities, including the construction of a training center and the renovation of the Grand Hôtel de France from January.

On May 5, the owner of ES Sétif, Sonelgaz is preparing for next season by appointing Abdelkrim Bira as general manager. Bira will be in charge of the sporting aspect by preparing the summer transfer window but he will also be the club's spokesperson. After a transitional season which saw Sonelgaz erase the club's debts to the tune of 37 billion centimes or almost 2 million euros.

== Squad list ==
Players and squad numbers last updated on 5 February 2024.
Note: Flags indicate national team as has been defined under FIFA eligibility rules. Players may hold more than one non-FIFA nationality.

No.	Nat.	Position	Name	Date of Birth (Age)	Signed from
Goalkeepers
1	(Algeria)	GK	Mohamed Lotfi Anis Osmani	27 June 1996 (aged 27)	Unattached
23	(Algeria)	GK	Imad Benchlef	12 October 1993 (aged 29)	(Algeria) USM Alger
25	(Algeria)	GK	Zakaria Saidi	5 August 1996 (aged 27)	(Algeria) JS Saoura
Defenders
2	(Algeria)	CB	Drice Chaabi	20 September 1997 (aged 25)	(Belgium) Francs Borains
3	(Algeria)	LB	Abdelmoumen Chikhi	29 February 1996 (aged 27)	(Algeria) CR Belouizdad
4	(Algeria)	CB	Ahmed Guettaf	2 June 2002 (aged 21)	(France) AS Saint-Priest
5	(Algeria)	RB	Mohamed Khoutir Ziti	19 April 1989 (aged 34)	(Libya) Nasr Benghazi
12	(Algeria)	CB	Tarek Aggoun	27 October 1997 (aged 25)	(Kuwait) Al-Sahel SC
13	(Algeria)	CB	Yacine Zeghad	29 November 2001 (aged 21)	(Algeria) NC Magra
16	(Mali)	CB	Moriba Diarra	30 December 1995 (aged 27)	(Mali) Stade Malien
22	(Algeria)	LB	Belkacem Brahimi	20 January 1994 (aged 29)	(Algeria) MC Alger
65	(Algeria)	RB	Imad Reguieg	2 June 2002 (aged 21)	(Algeria) MC Oran
Midfielders
6	(Algeria)	MF	Amir Yahia	18 July 1996 (aged 27)	(Algeria) US Souf
7	(Algeria)	MF	Salah Bouchama	22 October 2001 (aged 21)	(Algeria) Youth system
10	(Algeria)	MF	Abdou Salam Jiddou	1 February 2000 (aged 23)	Unattached
15	(Algeria)	MF	Sami Guediri	18 August 1997 (aged 26)	Unattached
18	(Algeria)	MF	Taher Benkhelifa	10 June 1994 (aged 29)	USM Alger
21	(Algeria)	MF	Zineddine Benboulaid	12 November 1997 (aged 25)	(Algeria) RC Arbaâ
24	(Algeria)	MF	Amir Nouri	10 July 1994 (aged 29)	(France) Stade Briochin
Forwards
9	(Algeria)	FW	Saïd Bouchoucha	18 January 1998 (aged 25)	(Algeria) JSM Tiaret
11	(Algeria)	FW	Ramdane Hitala	8 February 1995 (aged 28)	(Algeria) MC El Bayadh
14	(Algeria)	FW	Abdesslem Bouchouareb	10 December 1997 (aged 26)	(Algeria) USM Alger
17	(Algeria)	FW	Abdelmalek Oukil	7 July 1996 (aged 27)	(Algeria) MC Alger
20	(Algeria)	FW	Aimen Lahmeri	28 May 1996 (aged 27)	(Algeria) JS Saoura
26	(Algeria)	FW	Abdelaziz Moulay	20 April 1999 (aged 24)	(Algeria) ASO Chlef
27	(Algeria)	FW	Walid Zamoum	10 June 1997 (aged 26)	(Algeria) JSM Béjaïa

== Transfers ==
=== In ===
==== Summer ====
Date	Pos	Player	Moving from	Fee	Source
10 August 2023	FW	(Algeria) Abdelmalek Oukil	MC Alger	Loan	
14 August 2023	MF	(Algeria) Belaid Hamidi	CR Belouizdad	Loan	
15 August 2023	DF	(Mali) Moriba Diarra	(Mali) Stade Malien	Free transfer	
16 August 2023	DF	(Algeria) Zakaria Zaitri	JS Saoura	Free transfer	
17 August 2023	FW	(Ivory Coast) Souleymane Coulibaly	(Cyprus) Karmiotissa	Free transfer	
17 August 2023	DF	(Algeria) Imad Reguig	MC Oran	Free transfer	
17 August 2023	GK	(Algeria) Zakaria Saidi	JS Saoura	Free transfer	
17 August 2023	DF	(Algeria) Abdelmoumen Chikhi	CR Belouizdad	Free transfer	
17 August 2023	MF	(Algeria) Islam Bouloudène	CR Belouizdad	Free transfer	
17 August 2023	MF	(Algeria) Zineddine Benboulaid	RC Arbaâ	Free transfer	
17 August 2023	MF	(Algeria) Saïd Bouchoucha	JSM Tiaret	Free transfer	
17 August 2023	GK	(Algeria) Imad Benchlef	USM Alger	Free transfer	
17 August 2023	FW	(Algeria) Aymen Lahmeri	JS Saoura	Loan	
17 August 2023	DF	(Algeria) Yacine Zeghad	NC Magra	Free transfer	
17 August 2023	MF	(Algeria) Amir Yahia	US Souf	Free transfer	

==== Winter ====
Date	Pos	Player	Moving from	Fee	Source
4 February 2024	DF	(Algeria) Ahmed Guettaf	(France) AS Saint-Priest	Free transfer	
4 February 2024	FW	(Algeria) Ramdane Hitala	MC El Bayadh	Free transfer	
4 February 2024	MF	(Algeria) Taher Benkhelifa	USM Alger	Free transfer	
4 February 2024	FW	(Algeria) Abdesslem Bouchouareb	USM Alger	Free transfer	
4 February 2024	FW	(Algeria) Abdelaziz Moulay	ASO Chlef	Undisclosed	

=== Out ===
==== Summer ====
Date	Pos	Player	Moving to	Fee	Source
16 July 2023	FW	(Algeria) Zerroug Boucif	Paradou AC	Loan return	
4 August 2023	FW	(Algeria) Ghiles Guenaoui	CS Constantine	Free transfer	
5 August 2023	FW	(Algeria) Youcef Fellahi	CA Bizertin	Free transfer	
19 August 2023	DF	(Algeria) Hamza Salem	US Biskra	Free transfer	
22 August 2023	FW	(Cameroon) Enow Nkembe	CS Constantine	Free transfer	
25 August 2023	MF	(Algeria) Youcef Dali	Unattached	Free transfer (Released)	
25 August 2023	DF	(Algeria) Tarek Belouchat	Unattached	Free transfer (Released)	
25 August 2023	FW	(Algeria) Mohamed Aimen Akziz	Unattached	Free transfer (Released)	
27 August 2023	DF	(Algeria) Kheireddine Benamrane	Unattached	Free transfer (Released)	
27 August 2023	MF	(Algeria) Houssem Ouassni	Unattached	Free transfer (Released)	
27 August 2023	MF	(Algeria) Bassem Chaouti	Unattached	Free transfer (Released)	
27 August 2023	MF	(Algeria) Youcef Serraoui	Unattached	Free transfer (Released)	
27 August 2023	DF	(Algeria) Islem Chebbour	Unattached	Free transfer (Released)	

==== Winter ====
Date	Pos	Player	Moving to	Fee	Source
9 January 2024	DF	(Algeria) Zakaria Zaitri	Free agent	Free transfer (Released)	
9 January 2024	MF	(Algeria) Nassim Yattou	Free agent	Free transfer (Released)	
9 January 2024	FW	(Algeria) Abdelhak Askar	Free agent	Free transfer (Released)	
19 February 2024	FW	(Ivory Coast) Souleymane Coulibaly	Free agent	Free transfer (Released)	

== Competitions ==
=== Overview ===
Competition	Record								Started round	Final position / round	First match	Last match
Competition	G	W	D	L	GF	GA	GD	Win %	Started round	Final position / round	First match	Last match
Ligue 1	30	14	6	10	37	37	+0	46.67	—N/a	5th	15 September 2023	14 June 2024
Algerian Cup	2	1	1	0	3	2	+1	50.00	Round of 64	Round of 32	2 February 2024	9 March 2024
Total	32	15	7	10	40	39	+1	46.88				

Updated to match played 14 June 2024
Source: Competitions

=== Ligue 1 ===
==== League table ====
Pos	Team	Pld	W	D	L	GF	GA	GD	Pts	Qualification or relegation
3	CS Constantine	30	15	8	7	46	30	+16	53	Qualification for CAF Confederation Cup
4	USM Alger	30	15	4	11	40	32	+8	49	Qualification for CAF Confederation Cup
5	ES Sétif	30	14	6	10	37	37	0	48	
6	Paradou AC	30	11	9	10	36	22	+14	42	
7	JS Kabylie	30	10	12	8	33	27	+6	42	

Source: the-sports.org
Rules for classification: 1) points; 2) head-to-head points; 3) head-to-head goal difference; 4) goal difference; 5) total goals; 6) fairplay ranking; 7) playoff.

==== Results summary ====
Overall								Home						Away					
Pld	W	D	L	GF	GA	GD	Pts	W	D	L	GF	GA	GD	W	D	L	GF	GA	GD
30	14	6	10	37	37	0	48	10	4	1	22	12	+10	4	2	9	15	25	−10

Last updated: 14 June 2024.
Source: Competitive matches

==== Results by round ====
Round	1	2	3	4	5	6	7	8	9	10	11	12	13	14	15	16	17	18	19	20	21	22	23	24	25	26	27	28	29	30
Ground	A	H	H	A	H	A	H	A	H	A	H	A	H	A	H	H	A	A	H	A	H	A	H	A	H	A	H	A	H	A
Result	L	W	W	L	W	L	L	D	D	W	W	W	D	L	W	W	L	L	W	W	D	L	W	D	W	L	D	L	W	W
Position	10	10	5	9	5	8	12	12	13	10	5	4	5	8	6	5	5	8	7	5	5	5	4	4	4	4	5	5	5	5

Updated to match(es) played on 14 June 2024. Source: Competitive matches
A = Away; H = Home; W = Win; D = Draw; L = Loss

==== Matches ====
The league fixtures were announced on 24 August 2023.

All times are local, WAT (UTC+1).

Win Draw Loss Postponed

15 September 2023 Round 1	USM Khenchela	1–0	ES Sétif	Khenchela
16:00	Kaddour 61'	Report		Stadium: Amar Hamam Stadium; Referee: Houssam Benyahia

23 September 2023 Round 2	ES Sétif	2–1	MC El Bayadh	Sétif
19:00	Lahmeri 67'; Coulibaly 78' (pen.)	Report	Hitala 80'	Stadium: 8 May 1945 Stadium; Referee: Anes Azrine

6 October 2023 Round 4	MC Alger	5–3	ES Sétif	Dar El Beïda
15:45	Bayazid 10', 56'; Halaïmia 25'; Belaïli 53'; Merzougui 90+2'	Report	Zeghad 29'; Oukil 42'; Bouchama 80'	Stadium: Omar Benrabah Stadium; Referee: Nabil Boukhalfa

10 November 2023 Round 5	ES Sétif	1–0	JS Kabylie	Sétif
15:45	Aggoun 90'	Report		Stadium: 8 May 1945 Stadium; Attendance: 0 (close doors); Referee: Lotfi Bekouassa

14 November 2023 Round 3	ES Sétif	2–1	USM Alger	Sétif
19:00	Lahmeri 16' (pen.); Aggoun 49'	Report	Yahia 28' (o.g.)	Stadium: 8 May 1945 Stadium; Attendance: 0 (close doors); Referee: Akram Mechairia

18 November 2023 Round 6	ASO Chlef	2–1	ES Sétif	Chlef
17:00	Yattou 28' (o.g.); Moulay 51'	Report	Zamoum 38'	Stadium: Mohamed Boumezrag Stadium; Referee: Rafik Aouina

2 December 2023 Round 8	JS Saoura	0–0	ES Sétif	Béchar
16:45		Report		Stadium: 20 August 1955 Stadium; Referee: Youcef Taieb Bouderbal

9 December 2023 Round 9	ES Sétif	2–2	US Biskra	Sétif
18:00	Coulibaly 55'; Zamoum 70'	Report	Zeghnoun 12'; Baâli 28'	Stadium: 8 May 1945 Stadium; Referee: Mohamed Lamine Chaoubi

16 December 2023 Round 10	US Souf	1–3	ES Sétif	El Oued
15:00	Bassou 31'	Report	Chacha 8' (o.g.); Zeghad 73'; Bouchoucha 90'	Stadium: 1 November 1954 Stadium; Referee: Youcef Gamouh

29 December 2023 Round 11	ES Sétif	1–0	MC Oran	Sétif
16:00	Lahmeri 63' (pen.)	Report		Stadium: 8 May 1945 Stadium; Referee: Mohamed Belkebir

5 January 2024 Round 12	NC Magra	0–1	ES Sétif	Magra
15:15		Report	Lahmeri 61' (pen.)	Stadium: Boucheligue Brothers Stadium; Referee: Anes Azrine

9 January 2024 Round 7	ES Sétif	1–3	CR Belouizdad	Sétif
19:00	Coulibaly 49'	Report	Wamba 5'; Laouafi 29'; Meziane 70'	Stadium: 8 May 1945 Stadium; Referee: Youcef Tayeb Bouderbal

13 January 2024 Round 13	ES Sétif	1–1	ES Ben Aknoun	Sétif
18:00	Oukil 52'	Report	Hachoud 42'	Stadium: 8 May 1945 Stadium; Referee: Bilal Bendjahene

19 January 2024 Round 14	Paradou AC	1–0	ES Sétif	Dar El Beïda
15:30	Titraoui 49'	Report		Stadium: Omar Benrabah Stadium; Referee: Abdelali Ibrir

26 January 2024 Round 15	ES Sétif	2–1	CS Constantine	Sétif
16:45	Lahmeri 11' (pen.); Chikhi 29'	Report	Rebiaï 5'	Stadium: 8 May 1945 Stadium; Referee: Billel Soltani

9 February 2024 Round 16	ES Sétif	2–1	USM Khenchela	Sétif
16:45	Oukil 42'; Lahmeri 79' (pen.)	Report	Sameur 83' (pen.)	Stadium: 8 May 1945 Stadium; Referee: Nabil Boukhalfa

15 February 2024 Round 17	MC El Bayadh	3–0	ES Sétif	El Bayadh
15:30	Belmiloud 10'; Belaribi 27'; Ghenam 84' (pen.)	Report		Stadium: Zakaria Medjdoub Stadium; Referee: Yahia Dahar

2 March 2024 Round 19	ES Sétif	1–0	MC Alger	Sétif
18:00	Benkhelifa 20'	Report		Stadium: 8 May 1945 Stadium; Referee: Mohamed Saidi

15 March 2024 Round 20	JS Kabylie	0–1	ES Sétif	Tizi Ouzou
22:00		Report	Lahmeri 22'	Stadium: 1 November 1954 Stadium; Referee: Abdelali Ibrir

19 March 2024 Round 18	USM Alger	2–0	ES Sétif	Algiers
22:00	Bacha 34'; Kanou 59'	Report		Stadium: Stade du 5 Juillet; Referee: Nabil Boukhalfa

24 March 2024 Round 21	ES Sétif	0–0	ASO Chlef	Sétif
22:00		Report		Stadium: 8 May 1945 Stadium; Referee: Rafik Aouina

4 April 2024 Round 22	CR Belouizdad	2–1	ES Sétif	Algiers
22:00	Wamba 52' (pen.); Belkhir 53'	Report	Bouchoucha 90+4'	Stadium: Stade du 5 Juillet; Referee: Yahia Dahar

19 April 2024 Round 23	ES Sétif	2–1	JS Saoura	Sétif
16:00	Aggoun 45+2'; Aouissi 71'	Report	Hammia 45+2'	Stadium: 8 May 1945 Stadium; Referee: Mohamed Amine Chaoubi

26 April 2024 Round 24	US Biskra	2–2	ES Sétif	Biskra
16:00	Ounnas 30', 61'	Report	Zamoum 9'; Jiddou 17'	Stadium: 18 February Stadium; Referee: Mehadji Tayeb Bouderbal

10 May 2024 Round 25	ES Sétif	3–0	US Souf	Sétif
18:00	Zamoum 25'; Lahmeri 33'; Guettaf 44'	Report		Stadium: 8 May 1945 Stadium; Referee: Mohamed Belkebir

17 May 2024 Round 26	MC Oran	4–1	ES Sétif	Oran
17:00	Boussalem 5' (pen.); Motrani 49', 64'; Aggoun 58' (o.g.)	Report	Lahmeri 32' (pen.)	Stadium: Ahmed Zabana Stadium; Referee: Fodil Oukil

26 May 2024 Round 27	ES Sétif	0–0	NC Magra	Sétif
16:45		Report		Stadium: 8 May 1945 Stadium; Referee: Mohamed Beloufa

7 June 2024 Round 28	ES Ben Aknoun	1–0	ES Sétif	Belouizdad
16:45	Hachoud 82' (pen.)	Report		Stadium: 20 August 1955 Stadium; Referee: Haithem Ghouti

11 June 2024 Round 29	ES Sétif	2–1	Paradou AC	Sétif
16:45	Moulay 62'; Nouri 90+4'	Report	Sais 45+1'	Stadium: 8 May 1945 Stadium; Referee: Fateh Harkat

14 June 2024 Round 30	CS Constantine	1–2	ES Sétif	Khenchela
16:45	Benmessabih 77'	Report	Moulay 59', 75'	Stadium: Amar Hamam Stadium; Referee: Mohamed Lamine Chaoubi

=== Algerian Cup ===
2 February 2024 Round of 64	NRB Tazouguert	1–2	ES Sétif	Khenchela
14:30	Kouadria 53'	Report	Bouchoucha 25', 69'	Stadium: Amar Hamam Stadium; Referee: Zine El Abidine Dekhane
Note: ES Sétif Lineups: Saidi, Chikhi, Guettaf, Zeghad, Bouchama, Nouri, Mechaar, Jiddou (substituted off) 90+1' (Mohra (substituted on) 90+1'), Oukil, Lahmeri, Benchoucha.

9 March 2024 Round of 32	ES Sétif	1–1 (a.e.t.) (8–9 p)	CS Constantine	Sétif
16:45	Oukil 32'	Report	Méyé 75'	Stadium: 8 May 1945 Stadium; Referee: Mustapha Ghorbal
	Penalties
	Ziti (penalty scored); Chikhi (penalty scored); Jiddou (penalty scored); Aggoun (penalty scored); Zamoum (penalty scored); Chaabi (penalty scored); Hitala (penalty scored); Brahimi (penalty missed); Guettaf (penalty scored); Saidi (penalty missed)		(penalty scored) Dib; (penalty scored) Merbah; (penalty scored) Messibah; (penalty scored) Chekal; (penalty scored) Madani; (penalty scored) Zaalani; (penalty scored) Belaili; (penalty missed) Baouche; (penalty scored) Temine; (penalty scored) Bouhalfaya
Note: ES Sétif Lineups: Saidi, Chikhi, Reguieg (substituted off) 90' (Ziti (substituted on) 90'), Guettaf, Aggoun, Chaabi, Benkhelifa (substituted off) 90' (Jiddou (substituted on) 90'), Nouri, Bouchama (substituted off) 63' (Hitala (substituted on) 63'), Oukil (substituted off) 74' (Moulay (substituted on) 74'), Lahmeri (substituted off) 90' (Zamoum (substituted on) 90').

== Squad information ==
=== Playing statistics ===
As of 14 June 2024

No.	Pos	Player	Nat	Ligue 1			Algerian Cup			Total		
No.	Pos	Player	Nat	App	St	G	App	St	G	App	St	G
Goalkeepers
1	GK	Mohamed Lotfi Anis Osmani	(Algeria)	2	2	0	0	0	0	2	2	0
23	GK	Imad Benchlef	(Algeria)	3	3	0	0	0	0	3	3	0
25	GK	Zakaria Saidi	(Algeria)	25	24	0	2	2	0	27	26	0
50	GK	Ala Eddine Bouaoune	(Algeria)	1	1	0	0	0	0	1	1	0
Defenders
2	DF	Drice Chaabi	(Algeria)	19	17	0	1	1	0	20	18	0
3	DF	Abdelmoumen Chikhi	(Algeria)	19	17	1	2	2	0	21	19	1
4	DF	Ahmed Guettaf	(Algeria)	12	10	1	2	2	0	14	12	1
5	DF	Mohamed Khoutir Ziti	(Algeria)	8	6	0	1	0	0	9	6	0
12	DF	Tarek Aggoun	(Algeria)	27	24	3	1	1	0	28	25	3
13	DF	Yacine Zeghad	(Algeria)	8	7	2	1	1	0	9	8	2
16	DF	Moriba Diarra	(Mali)	13	10	0	0	0	0	13	10	0
22	DF	Belkacem Brahimi	(Algeria)	8	5	0	0	0	0	8	5	0
65	DF	Imad Reguieg	(Algeria)	15	13	0	1	1	0	16	14	0
68	DF	Rachid Boumessous	(Algeria)	10	5	0	0	0	0	10	5	0
71	DF	Abderrazak Mohra	(Algeria)	1	0	0	1	1	0	2	1	0
Midfielders
6	MF	Amir Yahia	(Algeria)	6	4	0	0	0	0	6	4	0
7	MF	Salah Bouchama	(Algeria)	26	20	1	2	2	0	28	22	1
10	MF	Abdou Salam Jiddou	(Mali)	25	20	1	2	1	0	27	21	1
15	MF	Sami Guediri	(Algeria)	8	3	0	0	0	0	8	3	0
18	MF	Taher Benkhelifa	(Algeria)	11	10	1	1	1	0	12	11	1
21	MF	Zineddine Benboulaid	(Algeria)	5	1	0	0	0	0	5	1	0
24	MF	Amir Nouri	(Algeria)	25	21	1	2	2	0	27	23	1
32	MF	Bassem Mechaar	(Algeria)	9	5	0	1	1	0	10	6	0
Forwards
9	FW	Saïd Bouchoucha	(Algeria)	17	12	2	1	1	2	18	13	4
11	FW	Ramdane Hitala	(Algeria)	4	2	0	1	0	0	5	2	0
14	FW	Abdesslem Bouchouareb	(Algeria)	6	3	0	0	0	0	6	3	0
17	FW	Abdelmalek Oukil	(Algeria)	22	14	3	2	2	1	24	16	4
20	FW	Aimen Lahmeri	(Algeria)	28	28	9	2	2	0	30	30	6
26	FW	Abdelaziz Moulay	(Algeria)	13	9	3	1	0	0	14	9	3
27	FW	Walid Zamoum	(Algeria)	26	16	4	1	0	0	27	16	4
35	FW	Abdelmouine Ferdjioui	(Algeria)	1	0	0	0	0	0	1	0	0
61	FW	Mohamed Messaoud Salem	(Algeria)	1	0	0	0	0	0	1	0	2
88	FW	Youcef Aouissi	(Algeria)	7	0	1	0	0	0	7	0	1
90	FW	Rafik Douib	(Algeria)	2	0	1	0	0	0	2	0	1
Players transferred out during the season
~~18~~	DF	Zakaria Zaitri	(Algeria)	4	4	0	0	0	0	4	4	0
~~14~~	MF	Nassim Yattou	(Algeria)	6	5	0	0	0	0	6	5	0
~~11~~	FW	Abdelhak Askar	(Algeria)	5	4	1	0	0	0	5	4	1
~~19~~	FW	Souleymane Coulibaly	(Ivory Coast)	12	5	3	0	0	0	12	5	3
Total				30		37	2		3	32		40

Last updated: 14 June 2024
Source: soccerway.com

=== Goalscorers ===
As of 14 June 2024

Includes all competitive matches.

No.	Nat.	Player	Pos.	L 1	AC	TOTAL
20	(Algeria)	Aymen Lahmeri	FW	9	0	9
27	(Algeria)	Walid Zamoum	FW	4	0	4
17	(Algeria)	Abdelmalek Oukil	FW	3	1	4
9	(Algeria)	Saïd Bouchoucha	FW	2	2	4
19	(Ivory Coast)	Souleymane Coulibaly	FW	3	0	3
12	(Algeria)	Tarek Aggoun	DF	3	0	3
26	(Algeria)	Abdelaziz Moulay	FW	3	0	3
13	(Algeria)	Yacine Zeghad	DF	2	0	2
7	(Algeria)	Salah Bouchama	FW	1	0	1
3	(Algeria)	Abdelmoumen Chikhi	DF	1	0	1
18	(Algeria)	Taher Benkhelifa	MF	1	0	1
88	(Algeria)	Youcef Aouissi	FW	1	0	1
10	(Mali)	Abdou Salam Jiddou	MF	1	0	1
4	(Algeria)	Ahmed Guettaf	DF	1	0	1
24	(Algeria)	Amir Nouri	MF	1	0	1
Own Goals				1	0	1
Totals				37	3	40
