= 1 November 1954 Stadium =

1 November 1954 Stadium or Stade 1er Novembre 1954 may refer to any of several stadiums in Algeria that commemorate the date of the founding of the National Liberation Front, which obtained independence for Algeria from France:

- 1 November 1954 Stadium (Algiers), in Algiers
- 1 November 1954 Stadium (Batna), in Batna
- 1 November 1954 Stadium (El Oued), in El Oued
- 1 November 1954 Stadium (Tizi Ouzou), in Tizi Ouzou
