= Chérif Hadjar =

Algerian football manager (born 1965)

Personal information
- Date of birth: 20 February 1965 (age 61)

Team information
- Current team: MB Rouissat (head coach)

Managerial career
- Years: Team
- 2010–2011: US Remchi
- 2011–2012: CR Témouchent
- 2012–2013: JS Saoura
- 2014: MC Saïda
- 2014: Olympique de Médéa
- 2015: MC El Eulma
- 2015–2016: CRB Aïn Fakroun
- 2016: US Biskra
- 2016–2017: GC Mascara
- 2017–2018: AS Aïn M'lila
- 2018: RC Relizane
- 2018–2019: USM El Harrach
- 2019–2020: Olympique de Médéa
- 2021: JSM Skikda
- 2021–2022: CS Constantine
- 2022: HB Chelghoum Laïd
- 2022: US Biskra
- 2022–2023: MC El Bayadh
- 2023: JS Saoura
- 2024: ASO Chlef
- 2024: ES Mostaganem
- 2024–2025: USM Khenchela
- 2025: MC El Bayadh
- 2025–: MB Rouissat

Chérif Hadjar (Arabic: شريف حجار; born 20 February 1965) is an Algerian football manager.
