= 1 November 1954 Stadium (El Oued) =

Multi-use stadium in El Oued, Algeria

Coordinates: 33.400335°N 6.878262°E

- Interactive map of 1 November 1954 Stadium
- Full name: 1 November 1954 Stadium
- Location: Cite Elchott Route de Tebissa El Oued, El Oued, Algeria
- Owner: OPOW El Oued
- Capacity: 7,200
- Surface: Artificial turf

Construction
- Opened: 11 February 1998

Tenants
- US Souf; NT Souf

1 November 1954 Stadium (in Arabic: ملعب أول نوفمبر 1954) is a multi-use stadium in El Oued, Algeria. It is currently used mostly for football matches and athletics. The stadium holds 7,200 spectators. The stadium is a part of Elchott Sport Complex.
