= 2017–18 Algerian Ligue Professionnelle 1 =

Algerian Ligue Professionnelle 1
- Season: 2017–18
- Dates: 25 August 2017 – 19 May 2018
- Champions: CS Constantine
- Relegated: USM El Harrach; USM Blida; US Biskra
- Champions League: CS Constantine; JS Saoura
- Confederation Cup: NA Hussein Dey; USM Bel Abbès
- Matches: 240
- Goals: 527 (2.2 per match)
- Top goalscorer: Oussama Darfalou (18 goals)
- Biggest home win: MC Oran 5-0 US Biskra (17 March 2018) Paradou AC 5-0 O Médéa (12 Mai 2018)
- Biggest away win: Paradou AC 1-5 MC Alger (07 April 2018)
- Highest scoring: USM Bel Abbès 2-5 MC Oran (17 February 2018) ES Sétif 5-2 USM Blida (20 April 2018)
- Longest winning run: 6 matches JS Saoura
- Longest unbeaten run: 22 matches NA Hussein Dey
- Longest winless run: 15 matches CR Belouizdad
- Longest losing run: 4 matches USM Blida; CR Belouizdad; Paradou AC
- All statistics correct as of 27 May 2018.

The 2017–18 Algerian Ligue Professionnelle 1 was the 56th season of the Algerian Ligue Professionnelle 1 since its establishment in 1962. A total of 16 teams contested the league.

== Teams ==
Locations of teams for the 2017–18 Algerian Ligue Professionnelle 1

=== Stadiums ===
Note: Table lists in alphabetical order.

All Derby matches between CR Belouizdad, MC Alger, NA Hussein Dey, USM Alger, USM El Harrach and Paradou AC will be played on July 5, 1962 Stadium which seats 64,000 spectators.

Team	Stadium	Capacity
CR Belouizdad	20 August 1955 Stadium	10,000
CS Constantine	Chahid Hamlaoui Stadium	40,000
DRB Tadjenanet	Smaïl Lahoua Stadium	9,000
ES Sétif	8 May 1945 Stadium	25,000
JS Kabylie	1 November 1954 Stadium	15,000
JS Saoura	20 August 1955 Stadium	20,000
MC Alger	Stade 5 Juillet 1962	64,000
MC Oran	Ahmed Zabana Stadium	40,000
NA Hussein Dey	20 August 1955 Stadium	10,000
Olympique de Médéa	Lyes Imam Stadium	12,000
Paradou AC	Omar Hamadi Stadium	10,000
US Biskra	18 February Stadium	25,000
USM Alger	Omar Hamadi Stadium	10,000
USM Bel Abbès	24 February 1956 Stadium	45,000
USM Blida	Mustapha Tchaker Stadium	40,000
USM El Harrach	1 November 1954 Stadium	5,000

== Personnel and kits ==
=== Managerial changes ===
Managerial changes during the 2017-18 campaign.

=== Foreign players ===
This season saw the cancellation of the law on the recruitment of foreign players.

Club	Player 1	Player 2
CR Belouizdad	(Mali) Soumaila Sidibe	
CS Constantine	(Burkina Faso) Ousmane Sylla	(Mali) Moctar Cissé
DRB Tadjenanet	(Mali) Kodjo Dousse	
ES Sétif	(Gabon) Franck Obambou	
JS Kabylie	(Cameroon) Steve Ekedi	
JS Saoura	(Cameroon) ~~Jean Jules Bapidi~~	(Libya) Mohamed Al Ghanodi
MC Alger	(Nigeria) ~~Barnabas Imenger~~	(Madagascar) Ibrahim Amada
NA Hussein Dey	(Tunisia) Mehdi Ouertani	
Paradou AC	(Mali) Mohamed Sangaré	
US Biskra	(Mauritania) ~~Boubacar Bagili~~ (Republic of the Congo) Ronel Kangou	(Mauritania) ~~Abdellah Sy~~
USM Alger	(Mali) ~~Soumaila Sidibe~~	(Morocco) Reda Hajhouj

== Results ==
=== League table ===
Pos	Team	Pld	W	D	L	GF	GA	GD	Pts	Qualification or relegation
1	CS Constantine (C)	30	16	9	5	36	26	+10	57	Qualification for the 2018–19 Champions League
2	JS Saoura	30	16	6	8	38	27	+11	54	Qualification for the 2018–19 Champions League
3	NA Hussein Dey	30	11	16	3	36	24	+12	49	Qualification for the 2018–19 Confederation Cup
4	MC Oran	30	12	9	9	40	37	+3	45	
5	MC Alger	30	12	8	10	41	32	+9	44	Qualification for 2018–19 Arab Club Champions Cup
6	USM Alger	30	11	9	10	43	35	+8	42 (Note: Ranked on head-to-head results.)	Qualification for 2018–19 Arab Club Champions Cup
7	Paradou AC	30	12	6	12	35	30	+5	42	
8	ES Sétif	30	10	10	10	35	30	+5	40	Qualification for 2018–19 Arab Club Champions Cup
9	DRB Tadjenanet	30	10	7	13	33	41	−8	37 (Note: Ranked on head-to-head results.)	
10	USM Bel Abbès (Note: USM Bel Abbès were deducted 6 points. FIFA's decision was taken at its meeting on 9 June 2017, ordering the club to pay the amount due to the player Jessy Mayele as well as a fine of CHF 15,000 (15,000 Swiss francs).)	30	12	7	11	32	31	+1	37	Qualification for the 2018–19 Confederation Cup
11	JS Kabylie	30	8	12	10	34	39	−5	36 (Note: Ranked on head-to-head results.)	
12	CR Belouizdad	30	7	15	8	24	27	−3	36	
13	Olympique de Médéa	30	8	12	10	23	32	−9	36	
14	US Biskra (R)	30	9	7	14	23	30	−7	34	Relegation to Algerian Ligue Professionnelle 2
15	USM El Harrach (R)	30	7	7	16	27	37	−10	28	Relegation to Algerian Ligue Professionnelle 2
16	USM Blida (R)	30	5	8	17	28	50	−22	23	Relegation to Algerian Ligue Professionnelle 2

Updated to match(es) played on 19 May 2018. Source: DZFoot
Rules for classification: 1) points; 2) head-to-head points; 3) head-to-head goal difference; 4) goal difference; 5) total goals; 6) fairplay ranking; 7) playoff.
(C) Champions; (R) Relegated

=== Result table ===
Home \ Away	CRB	CSC	DRBT	ESS	JSK	JSSR	MCA	MCO	PAC	NAH	OM	UAL	USMB	UEH	USB	USR
CR Belouizdad		0–0	1–2	0–0	1–1	1–1	1–0	0–0	2–1	0–2	0–0	1–0	2–0	0–1	1–1	1–0
CS Constantine	1–0		2–1	2–1	2–1	4–2	1–0	1–0	0–0	3–1	1–1	2–1	1–0	0–0	1–1	1–0
DRB Tadjenanet	3–0	2–1		3–2	1–0	2–0	1–1	0–1	1–2	1–1	0–0	0–3	1–0	1–1	1–0	3–1
ES Sétif	2–1	1–0	2–0		0–0	2–0	1–2	4–1	2–1	1–2	0–0	1–2	0–0	2–1	5–2	1–0
JS Kabylie	2–2	1–2	1–0	1–0		1–1	3–1	3–3	1–1	1–1	3–0	3–2	2–1	2–1	1–1	0–0
JS Saoura	1–1	1–0	4–2	0–0	2–0		1–1	1–0	2–0	1–0	2–0	3–2	1–0	1–0	2–0	2–0
MC Alger	0–0	3–0	2–1	1–1	2–0	1–4		4–0	2–1	1–2	0–0	0–2	1–2	2–0	4–1	2–0
MC Oran	0–2	1–1	3–2	1–2	2–1	1–0	0–0		1–0	0–0	2–0	1–1	1–1	1–0	3–0	5–0
Paradou AC	0–0	2–0	1–0	2–2	2–0	3–0	1–5	1–0		1–1	5–0	0–0	0–1	2–3	1–0	1–0
NA Hussein Dey	0–0	1–1	3–0	0–0	2–1	0–0	1–0	1–1	1–1		2–0	1–1	1–1	1–1	4–1	2–1
Olympique de Médéa	1–1	0–0	1–1	0–0	0–0	2–0	1–0	2–0	1–0	3–1		1–1	0–1	1–0	2–1	1–2
USM Alger	4–0	1–2	1–1	3–2	0–0	0–2	2–2	3–1	2–1	1–2	1–1		1–2	2–0	1–2	2–0
USM Bel Abbès	1–0	1–2	1–1	2–1	4–1	0–1	1–1	2–5	0–1	0–1	2–1	2–0		1–0	1–0	0–0
USM El Harrach	1–2	1–1	1–2	0–0	2–0	2–3	2–0	2–3	2–1	0–0	2–3	0–0	1–2		2–0	1–0
USM Blida	2–2	1–2	1–0	0–0	2–3	1–0	1–2	0–1	0–1	2–2	2–1	2–3	2–2	2–0		0–0
US Biskra	0–0	1–2	4–0	1–0	1–1	1–0	0–1	2–2	1–0	0–0	2–0	0–1	2–1	2–0	2–0	

Updated to match(es) played on 19 May 2018. Source: DZFoot
Legend: Blue = home team win; Yellow = draw; Red = away team win.

== Positions by round ==
Team ╲ Round	1	2	3	4	5	6	7	8	9	10	11	12	13	14	15	16	17	18	19	20	21	22	23	24	25	26	27	28	29	30
CS Constantine	2	9	4	4	4	1	1	2	2	2	1	1	1	1	1	1	1	1	1	1	1	1	1	1	1	1	1	1	1	1
JS Saoura	7	2	2	5	3	5	3	4	3	3	3	2	2	2	2	2	2	3	3	6	6	7	5	7	6	4	3	3	2	2
NA Hussein Dey	15	13	13	11	10	11	12	13	12	12	11	11	10	7	7	8	6	6	7	7	7	8	6	4	4	3	2	2	3	3
MC Oran	1	8	8	3	5	4	5	6	7	7	4	6	5	6	6	5	4	5	2	2	2	2	2	2	3	5	5	6	6	4
MC Alger	6	7	11	13	13	13	13	12	9	6	8	5	6	5	5	4	3	4	5	3	3	3	4	3	2	2	4	4	4	5
USM Alger	4	4	6	12	7	6	2	1	1	1	2	3	3	4	3	3	5	2	4	4	4	4	3	5	5	6	6	5	5	6
Paradou AC	12	10	9	6	9	9	8	5	6	8	6	8	8	9	8	9	8	8	6	5	5	5	7	8	8	8	8	8	7	7
ES Sétif	4	4	3	2	2	3	6	7	4	4	5	4	4	3	4	6	7	7	8	8	8	6	8	6	7	7	7	7	8	8
USM Bel Abbès	14	11	12	7	8	7	7	8	8	9	10	9	9	10	9	7	9	9	9	9	10	9	9	9	10	13	10	9	9	9
DRB Tadjenanet	7	4	6	9	11	8	10	11	13	13	13	13	12	13	11	10	10	13	14	13	14	15	15	14	13	11	12	13	12	10
CR Belouizdad	3	1	1	1	1	2	4	3	5	5	7	7	7	8	10	11	12	11	11	12	11	11	12	10	9	9	11	10	10	11
JS Kabylie	7	3	5	8	6	10	9	9	10	10	9	10	11	12	12	13	11	14	12	14	13	13	11	12	11	12	9	11	11	12
Olympique de Médéa	7	12	9	10	12	12	11	10	11	11	12	12	13	11	13	12	13	10	10	10	9	10	10	11	12	10	13	12	13	13
US Biskra	11	15	15	15	14	14	14	14	15	14	15	14	14	14	14	15	15	12	13	11	12	12	13	15	15	14	14	14	14	14
USM El Harrach	12	13	14	14	16	15	16	15	14	15	14	15	15	15	15	14	14	15	15	15	15	14	14	13	14	15	15	15	15	15
USM Blida	16	16	16	16	15	16	15	16	16	16	16	16	16	16	16	16	16	16	16	16	16	16	16	16	16	16	16	16	16	16

Leader
2018 CAF Champions League or 2018 CAF Confederation Cup
Relegation to Ligue Professionnelle 2 2017-18

Updated to match(es) played on 19 May 2018. Source: DZfoot.com (in French)

== Clubs season-progress ==
Team ╲ Round	1	2	3	4	5	6	7	8	9	10	11	12	13	14	15	16	17	18	19	20	21	22	23	24	25	26	27	28	29	30
CR Belouizdad	W	W	W	D	D	D	D	D	L	D	D	D	D	L	L	L	L	D	W	L	D	D	L	W	W	D	D	W	D	L
CS Constantine	W	L	W	D	W	W	W	D	D	W	W	W	W	D	L	D	W	W	D	L	W	L	W	D	L	W	D	W	W	D
DRB Tadjenanet	D	W	D	L	L	W	L	D	L	D	D	L	W	L	W	D	L	L	L	W	L	L	L	W	W	W	D	L	W	W
ES Sétif	W	D	W	W	D	D	L	L	W	D	D	W	D	W	L	D	L	L	D	W	D	W	L	W	L	W	L	L	L	D
JS Kabylie	D	W	D	L	W	L	W	L	D	D	D	D	L	D	D	L	D	L	D	L	W	L	W	D	W	D	W	L	W	L
JS Saoura	D	W	W	L	W	D	W	L	W	L	W	W	W	L	D	W	L	L	D	L	D	D	W	L	W	W	W	W	W	W
MC Alger	W	D	L	D	L	L	D	W	W	W	L	W	D	W	D	W	W	D	L	W	D	W	L	W	W	L	D	L	L	L
MC Oran	W	L	D	W	D	W	D	D	L	D	W	L	D	W	D	W	W	D	W	W	W	L	W	L	L	L	D	L	L	W
NA Hussein Dey	L	D	D	W	D	D	L	D	D	D	W	D	D	W	W	D	W	D	D	W	D	D	W	W	D	W	W	W	D	L
Olympique de Médéa	D	L	W	D	L	D	D	D	D	D	L	D	L	W	L	D	L	W	W	L	D	D	L	D	D	W	L	W	L	W
Paradou AC	L	W	D	W	L	D	W	W	L	L	W	L	D	L	W	D	L	W	W	W	D	W	L	L	L	L	W	L	W	D
US Biskra	L	L	L	D	W	L	L	D	D	W	L	D	L	W	L	L	W	W	L	W	L	L	L	D	D	W	L	W	D	W
USM Alger	W	D	D	L	W	W	W	W	W	D	L	L	D	D	W	D	L	W	L	D	D	W	W	L	D	L	W	W	L	L
USM Bel Abbès	L	W	L	W	D	W	D	L	D	D	L	W	D	L	W	W	W	L	W	L	L	W	W	L	L	L	W	W	D	D
USM Blida	L	L	L	L	D	L	D	L	L	L	D	D	W	D	L	L	D	W	L	L	W	L	W	L	D	L	D	L	L	W
USM El Harrach	L	L	L	D	L	L	L	W	W	D	D	L	L	L	W	D	W	L	D	D	L	W	L	W	D	L	L	L	W	L

Updated to match(es) played on 19 May 2018. Source: Clubs Season-Progress
W = Win; D = Draw; L = Lose

=== Top scorers ===
R.	Goalscorer	Team	Goals
1	(Algeria) Oussama Darfalou	USM Alger	18
2	(Algeria) Lamine Abid	CS Constantine	16
3	(Algeria) Samy Frioui	USM Blida	15
4	(Algeria) Moustapha Djallit	JS Saoura	12
5	(Algeria) Zakaria Naidji	Paradou AC	11
6	(Algeria) Walid Derrardja	MC Alger	10
6	(Algeria) Sid Ali Yahia-Chérif	JS Saoura	10
8	(Algeria) Hamza Banouh	USM El Harrach (4), ES Sétif (5)	9
8	(Algeria) Mohamed Tiaïba	MC Oran	8
8	(Algeria) Mehdi Benaldjia	JS Kabylie	8
8	(Algeria) Sofiane Bendebka	MC Alger	8
8	(Algeria) Abderrahmane Bourdim	JS Saoura	8

Updated to games played on 19 May 2018
Source: soccerway.com

=== Hat-tricks ===
Player	For	Against	Result	Date	Ref
(Algeria) Moustapha Djallit	JS Saoura	DRB Tadjenanet	4–2	28 October 2017	
(Algeria) Adil Djabout	JS Kabylie	MC Oran	3–3	15 December 2017	
(Algeria) Mourad Benayad	ES Sétif	USM Blida	5–2	20 April 2018	
(Algeria) Sid Ali Yahia-Chérif	JS Saoura	MC Alger	4–1	19 May 2018	

=== Clean sheets ===
^{*} Only goalkeepers who played all 90 minutes of a match are taken into consideration. Updated to games played on 4 February 2017

== See also ==
- 2017–18 Algerian Ligue Professionnelle 2
- 2017–18 Algerian Cup
