= 2022–23 Algerian Ligue Professionnelle 1 =

Algerian Ligue Professionnelle 1
- Season: 2022–23
- Dates: 26 August 2022 – 15 July 2023
- Champions: CR Belouizdad
- Relegated: RC Arbaâ; HB Chelghoum Laïd
- Champions League: CR Belouizdad; CS Constantine
- Confederation Cup: USM Alger; ASO Chlef
- Matches: 240
- Goals: 516 (2.15 per match)
- Top goalscorer: Seif Zine Toumi; Mohamed Souibaâh (13 goals)
- Biggest home win: JS Saoura 5–0 HB Chelghoum Laïd (29 November 2022)
- Biggest away win: HB Chelghoum Laïd 0–6 MC El Bayadh (9 April 2023)
- Highest scoring: NC Magra 5–2 HB Chelghoum Laïd (15 July 2023)
- Longest winning run: CR Belouizdad; USM Khenchela (5 matches)
- Longest unbeaten run: CR Belouizdad (19 matches)
- Longest winless run: HB Chelghoum Laïd (30 matches)
- Longest losing run: HB Chelghoum Laïd (14 matches)
- All statistics correct as of 15 July 2023.

The 2022–23 Algerian Ligue Professionnelle 1 was the 61st season of the Algerian Ligue Professionnelle 1. A total of 16 teams contested the league. It began on 26 August 2022 and concluded on 15 July 2023.

== Teams ==
16 teams contest the league. MC El Bayadh and USM Khenchela were promoted from the 2021–22 Algerian Ligue 2.

Locations of teams for the 2022–23 Algerian Ligue Professionnelle 1
Algiers Province clubs

=== Stadiums ===
Note: Table lists in alphabetical order.

Team	Home city	Stadium	Capacity
ASO Chlef	Chlef	Tahar Zoughari Stadium; Mohamed Boumezrag Stadium	30,000; 18,000
CR Belouizdad	Algiers	20 August 1955 Stadium	10,000
CS Constantine	Constantine	Ramadane Ben Abdelmalek Stadium	13,000
ES Sétif	Sétif	8 May 1945 Stadium	25,000
HB Chelghoum Laïd	Chelghoum Laïd	11 December 1961 Stadium	10,000
JS Kabylie	Tizi Ouzou	1 November 1954 Stadium	20,000
JS Saoura	Béchar	20 August 1955 Stadium	20,000
MC Alger	Algiers	Salem Mabrouki Stadium; Omar Benrabah Stadium	12,000; 8,000
MC El Bayadh	El Bayadh	Zakaria Medjdoub Stadium	15,000
MC Oran	Oran	Ahmed Zabana Stadium	40,000
NC Magra	Magra	Boucheligue Brothers Stadium	8,000
Paradou AC	Algiers	Omar Benrabah Stadium	8,000
RC Arbaâ	Larbaâ	Ismaïl Makhlouf Stadium	5,000
US Biskra	Biskra	18 February Stadium	24,000
USM Alger	Algiers	Omar Benrabah Stadium	8,000
USM Khenchela	Khenchela	Amar Hamam Stadium	5,000

=== Personnel and kits ===
Team	Manager	Captain	Kit manufacturer
ASO Chlef	(Algeria) Lyamine Bougherara	(Algeria) Abdelkader Boussaid	Joma
CR Belouizdad	(Tunisia) Nabil Kouki	(Algeria) Sofiane Bouchar	Umbro
CS Constantine	(Algeria) Kheïreddine Madoui	(Algeria) Brahim Dib	KSC
ES Sétif	(Egypt) Hossam El Badry	(Algeria) Abdelmoumene Djabou	Offside
HB Chelghoum Laïd	(Algeria) Toufik Rouabah	(Algeria) Amir Karaoui	Rina
JS Kabylie	(Belgium) José Riga	(Algeria) Badreddine Souyad	Hummel
JS Saoura	(Tunisia) Nacif Beyaoui	(Algeria) Adel Bouchiba	Umbro
MC Alger	(Bosnia and Herzegovina) Faruk Hadžibegić	(Algeria) Ayoub Abdellaoui	Joma
MC El Bayadh	(Algeria) Abdelhakem Benslimane	(Algeria) Belaid Kouar	Macron
MC Oran	(Algeria) Omar Belatoui	(Algeria) Mohamed Lagraâ	Macron
NC Magra	(Algeria) Azzedine Rahim	(Algeria) Hmida Salah	Macron
Paradou AC	(Portugal) Francisco Chaló	(Algeria) Kheireddine Boussouf	Macron
RC Arbaâ	(Algeria) Faiçal Kebbiche	(Algeria) Mohamed Billal Rait	Hummel
US Biskra	(Algeria) Cherif Hadjar	(Algeria) Nacereddine Khoualed	Rina
USM Alger	(Algeria) Boualem Charef	(Algeria) Mohamed Lamine Zemmamouche	Kappa
USM Khenchela	(Algeria) Nabil Neghiz	(Algeria) Abdelhakim Sameur	Joma

=== Managerial changes ===
Team	Outgoing manager	Manner of departure	Date of vacancy	Position in table	Incoming manager	Date of appointment
MC Alger	(Tunisia) Khaled Ben Yahia	End of contract	10 June 2022	Pre-season	(Bosnia and Herzegovina) Faruk Hadžibegić	16 July 2022
JS Kabylie	(Tunisia) Ammar Souayah	End of contract	11 June 2022	Pre-season	(Belgium) José Riga	22 June 2022
ES Sétif	(Serbia) Darko Novic	End of contract	17 June 2022	Pre-season	(Egypt) Hossam El Badry	14 July 2022
MC Oran	(Algeria) Abdelkader Amrani	Resigned	22 June 2022	Pre-season	(Algeria) Omar Belatoui	29 August 2022
NC Magra	(Tunisia) Lassaad Maamar	End of contract	22 June 2022	Pre-season	(Algeria) Bouziane Rahmani	30 June 2022
CR Belouizdad	(Brazil) Marcos Paquetá	End of contract	26 June 2022	Pre-season	(Tunisia) Nabil Kouki	4 July 2022
JS Saoura	(Algeria) Moustapha Djallit	End of caretaker spell	13 July 2022	Pre-season	(Tunisia) Nacif Beyaoui	13 July 2022
CS Constantine	(Algeria) Kheïreddine Madoui	Resigned	20 July 2022	Pre-season	(Tunisia) Kais Yâakoubi	28 July 2022
USM Khenchela	(Tunisia) Farouk Djanhaoui	End of contract	21 May 2022	Pre-season	(Algeria) Nabil Neghiz	28 July 2022
US Biskra	(Algeria) Youcef Bouzidi	End of contract	11 June 2022	Pre-season	(Algeria) Cherif Hadjar	29 July 2022
HB Chelghoum Laïd	(Algeria) Cherif Hadjar	End of contract	11 June 2022	Pre-season	(Algeria) Toufik Rouabah	24 August 2022
ASO Chlef	(Algeria) Samir Zaoui	End of contract	11 June 2022	Pre-season	(Algeria) Lyamine Bougherara	30 July 2022
CS Constantine	(Tunisia) Kais Yâakoubi	Sacked	30 July 2022	Pre-season	(Algeria) Kheïreddine Madoui	13 August 2022
NC Magra	(Algeria) Bouziane Rahmani	Resigned	30 July 2022	Pre-season	(Algeria) Azzedine Rahim	30 July 2022
USM Alger	(Morocco) Jamil Benouahi	Sacked	3 August 2022	Pre-season	(Algeria) Boualem Charef	4 August 2022
JS Kabylie	(Belgium) José Riga	Sacked	6 September 2022	16th	(Algeria) Abdelkader Amrani	13 September 2022
MC Alger	(Bosnia and Herzegovina) Faruk Hadžibegić	Mutual consent	10 September 2022	11th	(Tunisia) Faouzi Benzarti	25 September 2022
NC Magra	(Algeria) Azzedine Rahim	Resigned	11 September 2022	11th	(Tunisia) Samir Jouili	19 September 2022
JS Saoura	(Tunisia) Nacif Beyaoui	Resigned	22 September 2022	5th	(Algeria) Moufdi Cherdoud	26 September 2022
HB Chelghoum Laïd	(Algeria) Toufik Rouabah	Resigned	27 September 2022	16th	(Algeria) El Hadi Khezzar	11 October 2022
HB Chelghoum Laïd	(Algeria) El Hadi Khezzar	Resigned	18 October 2022	16th	(Algeria) Foudil Salem	18 October 2022
MC El Bayadh	(Algeria) Abdelhakem Benslimane	Mutual consent	2 October 2022	8th	(Algeria) Cherif Hadjar	9 October 2022
US Biskra	(Algeria) Cherif Hadjar	Mutual consent	3 October 2022	7th	(Algeria) Youcef Bouzidi	7 October 2022
JS Saoura	(Algeria) Moufdi Cherdoud	Sacked	22 October 2022	14th	(Algeria) Moustapha Djallit	22 October 2022
ES Sétif	(Egypt) Hossam El Badry	Mutual consent	20 November 2022	4th	(Algeria) Khaled Lemmouchia	27 November 2022
JS Kabylie	(Algeria) Abdelkader Amrani	Mutual consent	1 December 2022	15th	(Algeria) Miloud Hamdi	2 December 2022
ASO Chlef	(Algeria) Lyamine Bougherara	Resigned	7 December 2022	13th	(Algeria) Abdelkader Amrani	22 January 2023
US Biskra	(Algeria) Youcef Bouzidi	Mutual consent	17 December 2022	10th	(Algeria) Mohamed Boutadjine	17 December 2022
USM Alger	(Algeria) Boualem Charef	Mutual consent	25 December 2022	7th	(Algeria) Abdelhak Benchikha	25 December 2022
USM Alger	(Portugal) Francisco Chaló	Mutual consent	2 January 2023	14th	(Algeria) Nadhir Leknaoui	9 January 2023
ES Sétif	(Algeria) Khaled Lemmouchia	End of caretaker spell	8 January 2023	6th	(Tunisia) Chiheb Ellili	8 January 2023
MC Alger	(Tunisia) Faouzi Benzarti	Mutual consent	15 February 2023	5th	(France) Patrice Beaumelle	3 March 2023
ES Sétif	(Tunisia) Chiheb Ellili	Mutual consent	19 February 2023	6th	(Algeria) Billel Dziri	25 February 2023
CS Constantine	(Algeria) Kheïreddine Madoui	Resigned	26 February 2023	2nd	(Algeria) Lyamine Bougherara	27 March 2023
JS Saoura	(Algeria) Moustapha Djallit	Mutual consent	25 March 2023	6th	(Algeria) Mustapha Sebaâ	25 March 2023
JS Saoura	(Algeria) Mustapha Sebaâ	Sacked	27 March 2023	6th	(Algeria) Mounir Zeghdoud	17 April 2023
NC Magra	(Tunisia) Samir Jouili	Mutual consent	24 April 2023	13th	(Algeria) Azzedine Aït Djoudi	1 May 2023
JS Kabylie	(Algeria) Miloud Hamdi	Sacked	1 May 2023	15th	(Algeria) Youcef Bouzidi	1 May 2023

=== Foreign players ===
Club	Player 1	Player 2
ASO Chlef	(Tunisia) Slim Jendoubi	(Botswana) Gape Mohutsiwa
CR Belouizdad	(Cameroon) Leonel Wamba	(Nigeria) Anayo Iwuala
CS Constantine	(Benin) Marcellin Koukpo	
ES Sétif	(Cameroon) ~~Duval Wapiwo~~ (Cameroon) Nkembe Enow	(Nigeria) ~~Godwin Chika~~
HB Chelghoum Laïd		
JS Kabylie	(Burkina Faso) Lamine Ouattara	(Burkina Faso) ~~Zakaria Sanogo~~ (Bosnia and Herzegovina) Semir Smajlagić
JS Saoura	(Guinea) ~~Alkhaly Bangoura~~	
MC Alger	(Ghana) Joseph Esso	(Nigeria) ~~Victor Mbaoma~~ (Madagascar) Razafindranaivo Koloina
MC El Bayadh		
MC Oran		
NC Magra		
Paradou AC		
RC Arbaâ		
US Biskra		
USM Alger	(Libya) Zakaria Alharaish	(Burkina Faso) ~~Hamed Belem~~ (Botswana) Tumisang Orebonye
USM Khenchela	(Nigeria) Tosin Omoyele	(Ghana) Maxwell Baakoh

== League table ==
Pos	Team	Pld	W	D	L	GF	GA	GD	Pts	Qualification or relegation
1	CR Belouizdad (C)	30	18	10	2	44	21	+23	64	Qualification for CAF Champions League
2	CS Constantine	30	14	8	8	39	26	+13	50	Qualification for CAF Champions League
3	MC Alger	30	12	11	7	21	20	+1	47	
4	MC El Bayadh	30	13	7	10	34	25	+9	46	
5	JS Saoura	30	11	9	10	32	25	+7	42	
6	ES Sétif	30	11	9	10	38	32	+6	42	
7	ASO Chlef	30	11	9	10	36	31	+5	42	Qualification for CAF Confederation Cup (Note: ASO Chlef qualified for the 2023–24 CAF Confederation Cup by winning the 2022–23 Algerian Cup.)
8	USM Khenchela	30	12	6	12	29	29	0	42	
9	Paradou AC	30	11	8	11	35	33	+2	41	
10	MC Oran	30	11	8	11	27	34	−7	41	
11	USM Alger	30	11	7	12	31	30	+1	40	Qualification for CAF Confederation Cup (Note: USMA Alger qualified for the 2023–24 CAF Confederation Cup as the title holders.)
12	US Biskra	30	10	10	10	30	29	+1	40	
13	NC Magra	30	11	7	12	35	36	−1	40	
14	JS Kabylie	30	10	9	11	35	26	+9	39	
15	RC Arbaâ (R)	30	10	6	14	39	43	−4	36	Relegation to Ligue 2
16	HB Chelghoum Laïd (R)	30	0	4	26	11	76	−65	4	Relegation to Ligue 2

Updated to match(es) played on 15 July 2023. Source: the-sports.org
Rules for classification: 1) points; 2) head-to-head points; 3) head-to-head goal difference; 4) goal difference; 5) total goals; 6) fairplay ranking; 7) playoff.
(C) Champions; (R) Relegated

== Results ==
Home \ Away	ASO	CRB	CSC	ESS	HBCL	JSK	JSS	MCA	MCEB	MCO	NCM	PAC	RCA	USB	USMA	USMK
ASO Chlef		0–1	3–2	4–0	4–0	1–0	2–1	0–0	0–0	2–1	0–1	1–1	1–1	2–1	2–1	2–0
CR Belouizdad	1–0		2–1	1–0	4–1	3–2	2–0	0–0	1–0	2–0	3–1	1–1	0–0	1–1	3–1	2–0
CS Constantine	3–0	0–0		2–0	2–0	0–0	2–0	0–2	3–1	0–0	1–0	1–0	2–0	2–1	3–0	3–1
ES Sétif	1–0	1–1	0–0		4–0	1–1	0–0	1–1	1–2	4–0	2–0	0–0	1–0	3–1	1–0	1–2
HB Chelghoum Laïd	0–0	0–1	1–1	0–4		0–2	0–2	0–1	0–6	1–2	0–5	1–1	0–3	0–1	1–3	1–2
JS Kabylie	0–0	1–2	0–1	2–3	1–0		1–2	2–0	3–1	4–0	2–0	2–1	4–0	1–0	1–0	0–0
JS Saoura	1–1	0–1	3–1	1–1	5–0	2–2		2–0	2–0	1–0	2–0	0–1	1–0	1–1	2–0	1–0
MC Alger	2–1	0–0	0–0	1–0	1–1	1–0	1–1		1–0	1–0	2–1	2–2	2–0	0–0	1–0	1–0
MC El Bayadh	2–0	1–3	3–1	2–0	1–0	0–0	2–0	1–0		1–1	1–0	0–0	3–1	1–1	0–0	2–0
MC Oran	0–0	3–1	0–0	3–1	2–0	2–0	1–0	3–0	1–1		0–0	1–0	2–1	1–0	1–0	1–1
NC Magra	4–2	0–0	2–1	0–1	5–2	2–1	1–0	0–1	1–0	2–0		1–2	0–0	2–1	1–1	2–1
Paradou AC	2–2	0–1	0–1	1–3	2–1	1–0	2–1	1–0	0–1	4–0	3–1		1–1	2–1	2–1	0–1
RC Arbaâ	0–3	0–4	1–2	3–1	3–1	1–1	2–0	0–0	3–1	3–1	5–1	1–3		2–0	2–1	5–1
US Biskra	2–0	1–1	3–2	2–2	3–0	1–1	0–0	0–0	1–0	2–1	1–1	2–1	1–0		1–0	1–0
USM Alger	1–3	2–2	2–1	1–1	3–0	1–0	1–1	2–0	1–0	0–0	0–0	2–1	3–0	1–0		2–0
USM Khenchela	2–0	4–0	1–1	1–0	2–0	0–0	0–0	2–0	0–1	1–0	1–1	3–0	2–1	1–0	0–1	

Updated to match(es) played on 15 July 2023. Source: the-sports.org
Legend: Blue = home team win; Yellow = draw; Red = away team win.

== Positions by round ==
Team ╲ Round	1	2	3	4	5	6	7	8	9	10	11	12	13	14	15	16	17	18	19	20	21	22	23	24	25	26	27	28	29	30
ASO Chlef	6	5	6	8	4	5	4	6	6	10	10	11	13	12	13	13	12	12	8	10	12	12	10	10	10	11	13	13	11	7
CR Belouizdad	1	1	1	3	3	2	2	1	1	1	1	1	1	1	1	1	1	1	1	1	1	1	1	1	1	1	1	1	1	1
CS Constantine	2	2	2	1	2	3	3	4	3	2	2	2	2	2	2	2	2	2	2	2	2	2	2	2	2	2	2	2	2	2
ES Sétif	8	4	4	4	5	7	9	11	7	5	5	3	3	5	6	3	6	5	6	6	6	4	5	7	3	3	4	6	7	6
HB Chelghoum Laïd	16	14	14	16	16	16	16	16	16	16	16	16	16	16	16	16	16	16	16	16	16	16	16	16	16	16	16	16	16	16
JS Kabylie	11	15	15	14	15	13	10	14	14	14	14	14	14	14	15	15	15	15	14	14	14	14	13	13	11	13	10	12	10	14
JS Saoura	4	8	9	5	8	10	12	9	10	8	7	6	6	4	5	6	4	4	5	5	5	6	8	5	6	6	3	5	6	5
MC Alger	15	13	11	9	10	6	5	3	5	3	3	4	5	3	4	5	5	3	3	3	3	3	4	3	5	4	7	4	4	3
MC El Bayadh	12	7	5	6	7	8	7	10	12	13	11	12	10	13	11	11	13	11	12	12	9	9	7	6	7	7	6	3	3	4
MC Oran	13	12	13	12	14	12	14	13	9	7	8	8	8	9	8	7	7	7	7	7	8	8	9	9	9	9	9	9	8	10
NC Magra	10	11	12	13	12	14	13	12	13	12	12	13	12	11	10	10	9	9	13	13	11	13	14	14	13	12	12	11	14	13
Paradou AC	5	9	8	11	11	15	15	15	15	15	15	15	15	15	14	14	14	14	15	15	15	15	15	15	15	15	14	14	12	9
RC Arbaâ	3	6	7	10	6	4	6	8	8	11	13	9	11	10	12	12	10	13	9	11	13	10	11	12	14	14	15	15	15	15
US Biskra	9	10	10	7	9	9	11	7	11	9	9	10	9	7	9	9	11	10	11	9	10	11	12	11	12	10	11	10	13	12
USM Alger	7	3	3	2	1	1	1	2	2	4	4	5	4	6	3	4	3	6	4	4	4	5	3	4	4	5	5	7	9	11
USM Khenchela	14	16	16	15	13	11	8	5	4	6	6	7	7	8	7	8	8	8	10	8	7	7	6	8	8	8	8	8	5	8

Leader
2022–23 CAF Champions League
Relegation to Algerian Ligue 2

Updated to match(es) played on 15 July 2023. Source: the-sports.org

== Clubs season-progress ==
Team ╲ Round	1	2	3	4	5	6	7	8	9	10	11	12	13	14	15	16	17	18	19	20	21	22	23	24	25	26	27	28	29	30
ASO Chlef	W	D	D	D	W	L	W	L	D	L	L	D	L	W	L	D	W	D	W	L	D	D	W	W	L	L	L	W	W	W
CR Belouizdad	W	W	W	D	D	W	D	W	W	W	W	W	D	W	W	W	D	L	W	D	W	D	D	D	W	W	D	W	L	W
CS Constantine	W	W	W	W	D	D	L	L	W	W	W	L	W	W	L	D	D	D	W	D	W	D	W	L	W	L	D	L	L	W
ES Sétif	D	W	W	D	L	D	D	L	W	W	W	W	L	L	D	W	L	W	L	W	L	W	L	D	W	D	L	L	D	D
HB Chelghoum Laïd	L	D	L	L	L	L	L	L	L	L	L	L	L	L	L	L	L	D	L	L	L	L	D	L	L	D	L	L	L	L
JS Kabylie	L	L	L	D	D	W	W	L	L	L	L	D	W	L	L	D	D	W	D	W	W	L	W	D	W	D	W	D	W	L
JS Saoura	W	L	D	W	L	L	L	W	D	W	W	W	L	W	D	D	W	D	L	W	L	D	L	W	D	D	W	L	L	D
MC Alger	L	D	D	W	D	W	W	W	L	W	W	D	L	W	L	D	D	W	W	D	D	D	L	W	L	D	L	W	D	W
MC El Bayadh	L	W	W	L	D	L	W	L	D	L	D	D	W	L	W	D	L	W	D	L	W	W	W	W	L	D	W	W	W	L
MC Oran	L	D	L	D	D	W	L	W	W	W	D	L	W	L	W	W	L	W	L	D	D	D	L	W	L	D	W	L	W	L
NC Magra	L	D	L	L	W	D	D	W	L	W	L	D	D	W	W	L	W	L	L	L	W	L	L	D	W	W	D	W	L	W
Paradou AC	W	L	D	L	L	L	L	W	D	L	L	D	W	L	D	W	D	D	L	W	L	W	D	L	W	D	W	W	W	W
RC Arbaâ	W	L	D	L	W	W	D	L	D	L	L	W	L	W	D	L	W	L	W	L	L	W	D	L	L	W	L	D	W	L
US Biskra	D	D	D	W	L	D	D	W	L	W	L	D	W	W	L	L	D	D	D	W	L	D	L	W	L	W	L	W	L	W
USM Alger	W	W	W	W	W	L	D	L	D	L	W	D	D	L	W	D	W	L	W	L	D	L	W	L	W	L	D	L	L	L
USM Khenchela	L	L	L	D	W	W	W	W	W	L	W	L	D	L	W	D	L	L	D	W	W	D	W	L	D	L	W	L	W	L

Updated to match(es) played on 15 July 2023. Source: the-sports.org
W = Win; D = Draw; L = Lose

== Season statistics ==
=== Top scorers ===
Rank	Goalscorer	Club	Goals
1	(Algeria) Seif Zine Toumi	RC Arbaâ	13
1	(Algeria) Mohamed Souibaâh	ASO Chlef	13
3	(Algeria) Sofiane Bayazid	USM Khenchela	12
3	(Algeria) Dadi El Hocine Mouaki	JS Kabylie	12

Updated to games played on 15 July 2023.
Source: soccerway.com

=== Hat-tricks ===
Player	For	Against	Result	Date	Ref
(Cameroon) Nkembe Enow	ES Sétif	HB Chelghoum Laïd*	0–4	6 June 2023	
(Algeria) Sofiane Bayazid	USM Khenchela*	CR Belouizdad	4–0	10 July 2023	

=== Monthly awards ===
Month	Number of rounds	Player of the Month		
Month	Number of rounds	Player	Club	Ref
August–September	5	(Algeria) Belhadj Chekal	CS Constantine	
October	4	(Algeria) Sofiane Bayazid	USM Khenchela	
November–December	6	(Algeria) Ahmed Kendouci	ES Sétif	
February–March	5	(Algeria) Ghiles Guenaoui	ES Sétif	
April–May	4	(Algeria) Kouceila Boualia	JS Kabylie	
June–July	6			

Goalkeeper	Defenders	Midfielders	Forwards	Coach
(Algeria) Alexis Guendouz	(Algeria) Ahmed Maamri (Algeria) Ayoub Abdlaoui (Algeria) Zinnedine Belaid (Algeria) Saadi Redouani	(Algeria) Dib Brahim (Algeria) Oussama Chita (Algeria) Zakariya Draoui	(Algeria) Dadi Mouaki (Algeria) Soubie Mohamed Amine (Algeria) Aymen Belkassim Bouzida	

== See also ==
- 2022–23 Algerian Ligue 2
