= 2023–24 Algerian Ligue Professionnelle 1 =

Algerian Ligue Professionnelle 1
- Season: 2023–24
- Dates: 15 September 2023 – 14 June 2024
- Champions: MC Alger
- Relegated: ES Ben Aknoun; US Souf
- Champions League: MC Alger; CR Belouizdad
- Confederation Cup: CS Constantine; USM Alger
- Matches: 240
- Goals: 556 (2.32 per match)
- Top goalscorer: Ismaïl Belkacemi; Youcef Belaïli (14 goals)
- Biggest home win: JS Saoura 6–0 US Souf (26 April 2024); Paradou AC 6–0 US Souf (26 May 2024)
- Biggest away win: US Biskra 0–5 Paradou AC (6 October 2023)
- Highest scoring: MC Alger 6–3 ASO Chlef (15 March 2024); US Souf 4–5 MC El Bayadh (23 March 2024)
- Longest winning run: MC Alger (8 matches)
- Longest unbeaten run: MC Alger (15 matches)
- Longest winless run: US Souf (13 matches)
- Longest losing run: US Souf (13 matches)
- All statistics correct as of 14 June 2024.

The 2023–24 Algerian Ligue Professionnelle 1 is the 62nd season of the Algerian Ligue Professionnelle 1 since its establishment in 1962. A total of 16 teams contest the league. It began on 15 September 2023 and concluded on 14 June 2024. The league was suspended on 18 October for three weeks in solidarity with the Palestinian people in Gaza during the Gaza war.

The highest league attendance was 80,000 during a game between MC Alger and USM Alger.

== Teams ==
16 teams contest the league. US Souf and ES Ben Aknoun were promoted from the 2022–23 Algerian Ligue 2.

Locations of teams for the 2023–24 Algerian Ligue Professionnelle 1
Algiers Province clubs

=== Stadiums ===
Note: Table lists in alphabetical order.

Team	Home city	Stadium	Capacity
ASO Chlef	Chlef	Mohamed Boumezrag Stadium	18,000
CR Belouizdad	Algiers	20 August 1955 Stadium; Stade du 5 Juillet	10,000; 64,000
CS Constantine	Constantine	Ramadane Ben Abdelmalek Stadium; Chahid Hamlaoui Stadium	10,000; 22,968
ES Ben Aknoun	Algiers	20 August 1955 Stadium	10,000
ES Sétif	Sétif	8 May 1945 Stadium	25,000
JS Kabylie	Tizi Ouzou	1 November 1954 Stadium	20,000
JS Saoura	Béchar	20 August 1955 Stadium	20,000
MC Alger	Algiers	Omar Benrabah Stadium; Stade du 5 Juillet	8,000; 64,000
MC El Bayadh	El Bayadh	Zakaria Medjdoub Stadium	15,000
MC Oran	Oran	Miloud Hadefi Stadium; Ahmed Zabana Stadium	40,143; 40,000
NC Magra	Magra	Boucheligue Brothers Stadium	8,000
Paradou AC	Algiers	Omar Benrabah Stadium	8,000
US Biskra	Biskra	18 February Stadium	24,000
USM Alger	Algiers	Omar Benrabah Stadium; Stade du 5 Juillet	8,000; 64,000
USM Khenchela	Khenchela	Amar Hamam Stadium	8,000
US Souf	El Oued	1 November 1954 Stadium	7,200

=== Personnel and kits ===
Team	Manager	Captain	Kit manufacturer
ASO Chlef	(Algeria) Chérif Hadjar	(Algeria) Abdelkader Boussaid	Umbro
CR Belouizdad	(Brazil) Marcos Paquetá	(Algeria) Chouaib Keddad	Puma
CS Constantine	(Algeria) Abdelkader Amrani	(Algeria) Brahim Dib	KSC
ES Ben Aknoun	(Algeria) Billel Dziri	(Algeria) Abdelkrim Oukali	Joma
ES Sétif	(Tunisia) Ammar Souayah	(Algeria) Drice Chaabi	Offside
JS Kabylie	(Algeria) Abdelkader Bahloul	(Algeria) Kouceila Boualia	Kappa
JS Saoura	(Algeria) Fouad Bouali	(Algeria) Adel Bouchiba	Umbro
MC Alger	(France) Patrice Beaumelle	(Algeria) Ayoub Abdellaoui	Puma
MC El Bayadh	(Algeria) Abdelhaq Belaid	(Algeria) Belaid Kouar	Macron
MC Oran	(Algeria) Youcef Bouzidi	(Algeria) Mourad Benayad	Macron
NC Magra	(Algeria) Lyamine Bougherara	(Algeria) Mohammed Bourahla	Macron
Paradou AC	(Algeria) Abdelkarim Saber Cherif	(Algeria) Toufik Moussaoui	Macron
US Biskra	(Algeria) Mounir Zeghdoud	(Algeria) Nacereddine Khoualed	Puma
USM Alger	(Spain) Juan Carlos Garrido	(Algeria) Zineddine Belaïd	Macron
USM Khenchela	(Algeria) Moufdi Cherdoud	(Algeria) Abdelhakim Sameur	Hummel
US Souf	(Algeria) Samir Chibane	(Algeria) Djilani Hadj Saad	Adidas

=== Managerial changes ===
Team	Outgoing manager	Manner of departure	Date of vacancy	Position in table	Incoming manager	Date of appointment
CR Belouizdad	(Tunisia) Nabil Kouki	End of contract	16 July 2023	Pre-season	(Belgium) Sven Vandenbroeck	19 July 2023
JS Saoura	(Algeria) Mounir Zeghdoud	End of contract	16 July 2023	Pre-season	(Algeria) Cherif Hadjar	25 July 2023
US Souf	(Algeria) Réda Bendriss	End of contract	16 July 2023	Pre-season	(Algeria) Omar Belatoui	31 July 2023
ES Sétif	(Algeria) Billel Dziri	End of contract	16 July 2023	Pre-season	(Algeria) Abdelkader Amrani	6 August 2023
ASO Chlef	(Algeria) Abdelkader Amrani	End of contract	16 July 2023	Pre-season	(Algeria) Abdelkader Yaiche	12 August 2023
US Biskra	(Algeria) Mohamed Boutadjine	End of contract	16 July 2023	Pre-season	(Algeria) Mounir Zeghdoud	13 August 2023
MC El Bayadh	(Algeria) Cherif Hadjar	End of contract	16 July 2023	Pre-season	(Algeria) Abdennour Hamici	13 August 2023
NC Magra	(Algeria) Azzedine Aït Djoudi	Sacked	16 July 2023	Pre-season	(Algeria) Aziz Abbès	13 August 2023
USM Khenchela	(Algeria) Nabil Neghiz	End of contract	16 July 2023	Pre-season	(Tunisia) Mourad Okbi	19 August 2023
MC Oran	(Algeria) Omar Belatoui	End of contract	16 July 2023	Pre-season	(Algeria) Kheïreddine Madoui	26 August 2023
ES Sétif	(Algeria) Abdelkader Amrani	Mutual consent	12 September 2023	Pre-season	(France) Franck Dumas	13 September 2023
Paradou AC	(Algeria) Nadhir Leknaoui	Resigned	13 September 2023	Pre-season	(France) Corentin Martins	15 September 2023
NC Magra	(Algeria) Aziz Abbès	Resigned	25 September 2023	16th	(Tunisia) Farouk Janhaoui	30 September 2023
JS Kabylie	(Algeria) Youcef Bouzidi	Mutual consent	1 October 2023	6th	(Portugal) Rui Almeida	14 October 2023
MC El Bayadh	(Algeria) Abdennour Hamici	Mutual consent	2 October 2023	12th	(Algeria) Abdelhaq Belaid	2 October 2023
CS Constantine	(Algeria) Lyamine Bougherara	Mutual consent	3 October 2023	10th	(Algeria) Abdelkader Amrani	21 October 2023
CR Belouizdad	(Belgium) Sven Vandenbroeck	Mutual consent	8 October 2023	11th	(Brazil) Marcos Paquetá	15 October 2023
ASO Chlef	(Algeria) Abdelkader Yaiche	Resigned	9 October 2023	4th	(Tunisia) Kais Yaâkoubi	25 October 2023
USM Alger	(Algeria) Abdelhak Benchikha	Resigned	9 October 2023	16th	(Spain) Juan Carlos Garrido	17 October 2023
ES Ben Aknoun	(Algeria) Abdennour Bousbia	Resigned	11 October 2023	15th	(Algeria) Billel Dziri	11 October 2023
USM Khenchela	(Tunisia) Mourad Okbi	Mutual consent	13 November 2023	4th	(Algeria) Nadhir Leknaoui	15 November 2023
JS Saoura	(Algeria) Cherif Hadjar	Resigned	20 November 2023	11th	(Tunisia) Nacif Beyaoui	22 November 2023
US Souf	(Algeria) Omar Belatoui	Resigned	26 November 2023	15th	(Algeria) Samir Chibane	4 January 2024
USM Khenchela	(Algeria) Nadhir Leknaoui	Mutual consent	18 December 2023	11th	(Tunisia) Yamen Zelfani	14 February 2024
NC Magra	(Tunisia) Farouk Janhaoui	Sacked	20 December 2023	12th	(Algeria) Atef Bettira	20 December 2023
ASO Chlef	(Tunisia) Kais Yaâkoubi	Resigned	10 January 2024	10th	(Algeria) Chérif Hadjar	15 January 2024
MC Oran	(Algeria) Kheïreddine Madoui	Resigned	11 January 2024	15th	(Algeria) Youcef Bouzidi	16 January 2024
JS Kabylie	(Portugal) Rui Almeida	Sacked	25 January 2024	9th	(Algeria) Azzedine Aït Djoudi	25 January 2024
MC El Bayadh	(Algeria) Abdelhaq Belaid	Mutual consent	6 February 2024	10th	(Algeria) El Hadi Khezzar	10 February 2024
ES Sétif	(France) Franck Dumas	Resigned	9 February 2024	4th	(Tunisia) Ammar Souayah	10 February 2024
NC Magra	(Algeria) Atef Bettira	Resigned	14 February 2024	13th	(Algeria) Lyamine Bougherara	10 February 2024
JS Saoura	(Tunisia) Nacif Beyaoui	Resigned	17 February 2024	11th	(Algeria) Fouad Bouali	3 March 2024
MC El Bayadh	(Algeria) El Hadi Khezzar	Resigned	19 March 2024	11th	(Algeria) Larbi Morsli	1 April 2024
Paradou AC	(France) Corentin Martins	Mutual consent	31 March 2024	6th	(Algeria) Abdelkarim Saber Cherif	31 March 2024
USM Khenchela	(Tunisia) Yamen Zelfani	Resigned	4 April 2024	9th	(Algeria) Moufdi Cherdoud	2 May 2024
JS Kabylie	(Algeria) Azzedine Aït Djoudi	Mutual consent	8 April 2024	9th	(Algeria) Abdelkader Bahloul	8 April 2024
MC El Bayadh	(Algeria) Larbi Morsli	Resigned	23 May 2024	11th	(Algeria) Abdelhaq Belaid	23 May 2024

=== Foreign players ===
Club	Player 1	Player 2	Player 3
ASO Chlef	(Botswana) Gape Mohutsiwa	(Togo) Yawo Agbagno	
CR Belouizdad	(Cameroon) Leonel Wamba	(Mali) Mamadou Samake	(The Gambia) Lamin Jallow
CS Constantine	(Cameroon) Nkembe Enow	(Cameroon) ~~Andre Ulrich Zanga~~	(Gabon) Axel Méyé
ES Ben Aknoun			
ES Sétif	(Ivory Coast) ~~Souleymane Coulibaly~~	(Mali) Moriba Diarra	(Mali) Abdou Salam Jiddou
JS Kabylie	(Gabon) Essang Matouti	(Tanzania) ~~Simon Msuva~~	(Mali) Mamadou Traore
JS Saoura	(Nigeria) ~~Michael Oghwiche~~	(Republic of the Congo) Carl Wunda	
MC Alger	(Ivory Coast) Youssouf Dao	(Ivory Coast) Mohamed Zougrana	(Ivory Coast) Romaric Ouattara
MC El Bayadh			
MC Oran	(Ghana) Maxwell Baakoh		
NC Magra			
Paradou AC	(Republic of the Congo) Christ Toulouenga	(Republic of the Congo) Gosim Elenga	
US Biskra			
USM Alger	(Botswana) ~~Tumisang Orebonye~~ (Cameroon) Leonel Ateba	(Mali) Sékou Konaté	(Mali) Abdoulaye Kanou
USM Khenchela	(Nigeria) Tosin Omoyele	(Ghana) ~~Maxwell Baakoh~~ (Mali) Diadié Samadiaré	(Rwanda) ~~Djabel Manishimwe~~ (Mali) Moussa Coulibaly
US Souf	(Libya) Mohammed Al-Ghunaymi		

== League table ==
Pos	Team	Pld	W	D	L	GF	GA	GD	Pts	Qualification or relegation
1	MC Alger (C)	30	19	8	3	55	20	+35	65	Qualification for CAF Champions League
2	CR Belouizdad	30	15	8	7	37	20	+17	53	Qualification for CAF Champions League
3	CS Constantine	30	15	8	7	46	30	+16	53	Qualification for CAF Confederation Cup
4	USM Alger	30	15	4	11	40	32	+8	49	Qualification for CAF Confederation Cup
5	ES Sétif	30	14	6	10	37	37	0	48	
6	Paradou AC	30	11	9	10	36	22	+14	42	
7	JS Kabylie	30	10	12	8	33	27	+6	42	
8	ASO Chlef	30	11	8	11	41	40	+1	41	
9	JS Saoura	30	11	7	12	34	37	−3	40	
10	USM Khenchela	30	11	6	13	33	39	−6	39	
11	MC El Bayadh	30	10	8	12	29	30	−1	38	
12	NC Magra	30	9	11	10	30	32	−2	38	
13	MC Oran	30	9	9	12	26	33	−7	36	
14	US Biskra	30	9	9	12	25	34	−9	36	
15	ES Ben Aknoun (R)	30	8	8	14	32	37	−5	32 (Note: ES Ben Aknoun awarded 3–0 win against US Souf.)	Relegation to Algerian Ligue 2
16	US Souf (R)	30	2	1	27	22	86	−64	7 (Note: US Souf lost 3–0 win against ES Ben Aknoun by penalty.)	Relegation to Algerian Ligue 2

Source: the-sports.org
Rules for classification: 1) points; 2) head-to-head points; 3) head-to-head goal difference; 4) goal difference; 5) total goals; 6) fairplay ranking; 7) playoff.
(C) Champions; (R) Relegated

== Results ==
Home \ Away	ASO	CRB	CSC	ESBA	ESS	JSK	JSS	MCA	MCEB	MCO	NCM	PAC	USB	USMA	USMK	USS
ASO Chlef		0–0	1–0	2–1	2–1	1–1	1–2	0–1	2–1	2–0	2–2	1–1	2–1	0–1	4–1	2–0
CR Belouizdad	0–1		2–1	1–0	2–1	1–0	3–1	0–0	1–0	2–0	1–0	1–1	4–0	0–1	2–3	2–0
CS Constantine	3–1	1–1		1–1	1–2	2–0	3–0	2–1	2–1	1–1	0–1	2–1	1–1	1–1	2–0	3–0
ES Ben Aknoun	2–2	1–1	0–1		1–0	2–3	2–0	2–3	1–1	2–1	3–1	0–1	2–1	1–2	3–2	0–1
ES Sétif	0–0	1–3	2–1	1–1		1–0	2–1	1–0	2–1	1–0	0–0	2–1	2–2	2–1	2–1	3–0
JS Kabylie	2–1	0–1	0–0	1–0	0–1		1–1	1–1	0–0	3–1	1–0	0–0	1–1	1–0	0–0	3–2
JS Saoura	3–2	1–2	2–2	1–0	0–0	3–2		0–1	0–0	1–1	2–1	2–1	1–0	2–1	0–1	6–0
MC Alger	6–3	0–0	2–0	4–0	5–3	1–1	4–0		2–0	3–2	4–0	1–0	1–0	1–0	3–0	3–0
MC El Bayadh	1–0	2–1	1–0	1–0	3–0	1–1	0–1	0–0		0–1	0–2	1–0	2–1	1–1	1–0	4–0
MC Oran	1–1	1–0	1–4	1–0	4–1	1–3	1–1	0–2	2–0		0–0	2–0	0–1	1–0	1–0	2–1
NC Magra	1–1	0–0	2–3	3–1	0–1	0–1	1–0	0–0	1–1	1–1		2–0	2–1	2–3	1–1	1–0
Paradou AC	2–3	0–1	0–0	0–0	1–0	0–0	0–0	0–1	1–0	1–0	0–0		0–0	1–0	2–0	6–0
US Biskra	2–0	0–0	0–1	1–1	2–2	1–0	2–1	1–0	0–0	0–0	0–1	0–5		1–0	2–1	3–1
USM Alger	2–1	2–1	1–2	0–2	2–0	2–2	2–1	0–0	2–1	2–0	3–1	1–5	1–0		3–0	3–0
USM Khenchela	2–0	2–1	1–2	0–0	1–0	2–1	1–0	1–1	2–0	0–0	2–2	1–2	0–1	1–0		2–0
US Souf	0–2	0–3	3–4	0–3	1–3	0–4	0–1	3–4	4–5	0–0	0–2	1–4	2–0	1–3	2–5	

Updated to match(es) played on 14 June 2024. Source: the-sports.org
Legend: Blue = home team win; Yellow = draw; Red = away team win.

== Clubs season-progress ==
Team ╲ Round	1	2	3	4	5	6	7	8	9	10	11	12	13	14	15	16	17	18	19	20	21	22	23	24	25	26	27	28	29	30
ASO Chlef	W	D	W	L	L	W	L	W	D	D	L	L	L	D	L	D	W	L	W	L	D	L	W	D	W	W	L	D	W	W
CR Belouizdad	W	W	W	L	L	W	W	D	W	D	W	L	D	D	W	W	D	D	L	L	W	W	W	L	W	D	W	D	L	W
CS Constantine	L	W	L	W	W	L	D	W	W	W	L	D	W	D	L	W	L	W	D	W	W	W	W	D	D	D	W	D	W	L
ES Ben Aknoun	L	D	L	L	L	L	D	L	L	D	D	W	D	D	D	L	L	W	W	W	D	W	W	L	L	W	L	W	L	L
ES Sétif	L	W	W	L	W	L	L	D	D	W	W	W	D	L	W	W	L	L	W	W	D	L	W	D	W	L	D	L	W	W
JS Kabylie	W	D	L	W	L	L	D	W	W	L	D	D	W	L	W	W	D	D	D	L	L	L	W	W	D	D	D	D	D	W
JS Saoura	W	D	W	L	D	L	W	D	W	W	D	L	L	W	L	L	D	L	D	W	L	W	L	W	L	W	L	W	D	L
MC Alger	W	L	W	W	W	W	W	W	W	W	D	D	D	W	W	W	W	D	L	W	W	W	D	W	D	W	D	D	L	W
MC El Bayadh	W	L	L	W	D	W	D	W	L	D	D	W	D	L	D	L	W	D	L	L	W	L	L	W	L	D	L	W	L	W
MC Oran	L	D	D	D	L	W	L	L	L	L	L	L	L	W	L	D	D	W	D	W	D	W	L	W	D	W	W	D	W	L
NC Magra	L	L	W	D	W	W	D	L	D	L	W	L	D	D	L	L	D	W	D	L	L	W	D	D	W	W	D	W	D	L
Paradou AC	W	D	L	W	W	W	D	L	L	D	D	W	D	W	W	W	D	D	D	L	D	L	W	L	L	L	W	L	L	W
US Biskra	L	W	L	L	W	W	D	D	D	W	D	D	D	L	W	W	L	L	D	W	L	W	L	D	D	L	L	L	W	L
USM Alger	L	W	L	L	W	L	W	W	L	D	D	W	W	W	W	L	L	W	D	W	W	L	L	D	W	L	W	L	W	W
USM Khenchela	W	L	W	W	L	L	D	L	W	L	W	W	W	D	L	L	W	D	W	L	D	L	L	L	D	L	W	W	D	L
US Souf	L	L	D	W	L	L	L	L	L	L	L	L	L	L	L	L	W	L	L	L	L	L	L	L	L	L	L	L	L	L

Updated to match(es) played on 14 June 2024. Source: the-sports.org
W = Win; D = Draw; L = Lose

== Positions by round ==
Team ╲ Round	1	2	3	4	5	6	7	8	9	10	11	12	13	14	15	16	17	18	19	20	21	22	23	24	25	26	27	28	29	30
ASO Chlef	3	2	2	5	8	5	8	6	6	6	10	12	13	13	13	12	12	13	12	12	12	13	12	12	12	9	10	12	10	8
CR Belouizdad	2	1	1	2	4	3	2	2	2	2	2	2	2	2	2	2	2	2	2	3	3	3	3	3	2	2	2	2	3	2
CS Constantine	9	9	11	8	3	7	7	5	3	3	3	3	3	3	5	4	4	4	4	2	2	2	2	2	3	3	3	3	2	3
ES Ben Aknoun	16	14	15	16	16	16	16	16	16	16	15	14	14	14	14	14	15	15	14	14	14	14	13	14	14	14	15	15	15	15
ES Sétif	10	10	5	9	5	8	12	12	13	10	5	4	5	8	6	5	5	8	7	5	5	5	4	4	4	4	5	5	5	5
JS Kabylie	4	4	7	6	10	12	13	9	8	9	11	11	9	10	8	7	7	6	8	8	9	11	7	7	7	7	7	8	8	7
JS Saoura	5	3	3	7	7	11	6	8	4	4	4	8	10	7	9	10	11	11	11	10	11	9	10	8	8	8	8	7	6	9
MC Alger	1	6	4	1	1	1	1	1	1	1	1	1	1	1	1	1	1	1	1	1	1	1	1	1	1	1	1	1	1	1
MC El Bayadh	6	11	13	10	11	4	4	4	7	7	7	6	8	9	10	11	9	9	9	11	9	10	11	10	11	12	13	11	14	11
MC Oran	14	13	14	14	15	14	14	14	14	14	14	15	15	15	15	15	14	14	15	15	15	15	15	15	15	15	14	13	12	13
NC Magra	11	15	12	11	9	6	5	10	11	13	12	13	12	12	12	13	13	12	13	13	13	12	14	13	13	10	11	10	11	12
Paradou AC	7	5	8	4	2	2	3	3	5	5	6	5	6	4	3	3	3	3	3	6	6	6	5	6	6	6	6	6	7	6
US Biskra	12	8	10	15	13	10	10	11	12	8	8	10	11	11	11	8	10	10	10	9	10	7	9	9	9	11	12	14	13	14
USM Alger	13	7	9	13	12	13	11	7	10	11	13	9	7	5	4	6	6	5	5	4	4	4	6	5	5	5	4	4	4	4
USM Khenchela	8	12	6	3	6	9	9	13	9	12	9	7	4	6	7	9	8	7	6	7	7	8	8	11	10	13	9	9	9	10
US Souf	15	16	16	12	14	15	15	15	15	15	16	16	16	16	16	16	16	16	16	16	16	16	16	16	16	16	16	16	16	16

Leader
2024–25 CAF Champions League
2024–25 CAF Confederation Cup
Relegation to Algerian Ligue 2

Updated to match(es) played on 14 June 2024. Source: the-sports.org

== Season statistics ==
=== Top scorers ===
Rank	Goalscorer	Club	Goals	Penalty	Assists
1	(Algeria) Youcef Belaïli	MC Alger	14	4	12
1	(Algeria) Ismaïl Belkacemi	USM Alger	14	2	2
3	(Algeria) Brahim Dib	CS Constantine	12	9	8
3	(Togo) Yawo Agbagno	ASO Chlef	12	0	0
5	(Algeria) Zakaria Naidji	MC Alger	11	0	7
6	(Cameroon) Leonel Wamba	CR Belouizdad	10	2	0
6	(Algeria) Hamza Demane	NC Magra	10	1	0

Updated to games played on 14 June 2024.
Source: soccerway.com

=== Hat-tricks ===
Player	For	Against	Result	Date	Ref
(Algeria) Youcef Belaïli	MC Alger	US Souf*	3–4	25 November 2023	
(Algeria) Zakaria Naidji	MC Alger*	USM Khenchela	3–0	16 December 2023	
(Algeria) Mounder Temine	CS Constantine	MC Oran*	1–4	11 January 2024	
(Algeria) Adil Boulbina	Paradou AC*	US Souf	6–0	26 May 2024	
(Nigeria) Tosin Omoyele	USM Khenchela	US Souf*	2–5	7 June 2024	
(Algeria) Ismaïl Belkacemi	USM Alger*	US Souf	3–0	11 June 2024	

== See also ==
- 2023–24 Algerian Ligue 2
- 2023–24 Algerian Cup
- 2024 Algerian Super Cup
- 2023 CAF Super Cup
- 2023-24 CAF Champions League
- 2023-24 CAF Confederation Cup
- 2023 Arab Club Champions Cup
