= Ligue de Football Professionnel (Algeria) =

Ligue de Football Professionnel رابطة كرة القدم المحترفة
- Organising body: FAF
- Founded: 2010
- Country: Algeria
- Confederation: CAF (Africa)
- Divisions: Ligue 1 Pro.
- Number of clubs: 16
- Level on pyramid: 1
- Relegation to: League 2
- Domestic cup: Algerian Super Cup
- League cup: Algerian League Cup
- Current champions: MC Alger
- Broadcaster(s): EPTV
- Website: www.lfp.dz
- Current: 2025–26 Ligue 1

The Ligue de Football Professionnel (French pronunciation: [liɡ də futbol pʁɔfɛsjɔnɛl], (Arabic: رابطة كرة القدم المحترفة) Professional Football League), commonly known as the LFP, is an Algerian league organization that runs the major professional football league in Algeria. It was founded in 2010 and serves under the authority of the Algerian Football Federation.

The league is responsible for overseeing, organizing, and managing the top league in Algeria, Ligue 1, the Algerian Super Cup and the Algerian League Cup.

== See also ==
- National Amateur Football League
