= 2011–12 Algerian Ligue Professionnelle 1 =

Algerian Ligue Professionnelle 1
- Season: 2011–12
- Dates: 6 September 2011 – 22 May 2012
- Champions: ES Sétif (5th title)
- Relegated: AS Khroub; MC Saïda; NA Hussein Dey
- Champions League: ES Sétif; JSM Béjaïa
- Confederation Cup: USM Alger
- Matches: 224
- Goals: 511 (2.28 per match)
- Top goalscorer: Mohamed Messaoud (14 goals)
- Biggest home win: MC El Eulma 4–0 NA Hussein Dey (4 November 2011); CA Batna 5–1 MC Oran (24 December 2011)
- Biggest away win: 2 goals (4 times)
- Highest scoring: USM Alger 3–4 JSM Béjaïa
- Longest winning run: CA Batna (5 games)
- Longest unbeaten run: CA Batna (7 games)
- Longest losing run: NA Hussein Dey (4 games)

The 2011–12 Algerian Ligue Professionnelle 1 was the 50th season of the Algerian Ligue Professionnelle 1 since its establishment in 1962. A total of 16 teams contested the league, with ASO Chlef as the defending champions. The league started on 6 September 2011, and ended on 22 May 2012.

While the league was originally scheduled to start on 10 September 2011, the official start date will be 6 September 2011, with a match between JS Kabylie and MC Alger. The tie was moved up due to the two club's participation in African competition.

== Team summaries ==
=== Promotion and relegation ===
Teams promoted from 2010–11 Algerian Ligue Professionnelle 2

- CS Constantine
- NA Hussein Dey
- CA Batna

Teams relegated to 2011-12 Algerian Ligue Professionnelle 2

- USM Annaba
- CA Bordj Bou Arréridj
- USM Blida

=== Stadiums and locations ===
Location of (qualified) teams in the Ligue Professionnelle 1 2011–12

Team	Location	Stadium	Stadium capacity
AS Khroub	El Khroub	Stade Abed Hamdani	10,000
ASO Chlef	Chlef	Stade Mohamed Boumezrag	17,000
CA Batna	Batna	Stade Seffouhi	5,000
CR Belouizdad	Algiers	Stade 20 Août 1955	21,000
CS Constantine	Constantine	Stade Mohamed Hamlaoui	40,000
ES Sétif	Sétif	Stade 8 Mai 1945	25,000
JS Kabylie	Tizi Ouzou	Stade 1er Novembre	20,000
JSM Béjaïa	Béjaïa	Stade de l'Unité Maghrébine	18,000
MC Alger	Algiers	Stade Omar Hammadi	15,000
MC El Eulma	El Eulma	Stade Messaoud Zougar	25,000
MC Oran	Oran	Stade Ahmed Zabana	40,000
MC Saïda	Saïda	Stade 13 Avril 1958	20,000
NA Hussein Dey	Algiers	Stade Frères Zioui	7,000
USM Alger	Algiers	Stade Omar Hammadi	15,000
USM El Harrach	Algiers	Stade 1er Novembre	8,000
WA Tlemcen	Tlemcen	Stade Akid Lotfi	30,000

== League table ==
Pos	Team	Pld	W	D	L	GF	GA	GD	Pts	Qualification or relegation
1	ES Sétif (C)	30	16	5	9	53	40	+13	53	Qualification for the Champions League preliminary round
2	JSM Béjaïa	30	15	8	7	40	26	+14	53	Qualification for the Champions League preliminary round
3	USM Alger	30	15	7	8	37	25	+12	52	Qualification for the Confederation Cup preliminary round
4	CR Belouizdad	30	13	9	8	34	28	+6	48	
5	ASO Chlef	30	14	5	11	41	34	+7	47	
6	MC Alger	30	11	11	8	35	33	+2	44	
7	CA Batna	30	12	8	10	38	25	+13	44	
8	WA Tlemcen	30	12	8	10	39	37	+2	44	
9	JS Kabylie	30	10	11	9	29	23	+6	41	
10	USM El Harrach	30	11	5	14	28	31	−3	38	
11	MC El Eulma	30	10	8	12	38	39	−1	38	
12	CS Constantine	30	8	12	10	35	42	−7	36	
13	MC Oran	30	9	8	13	38	51	−13	35	
14	AS Khroub (R)	30	7	10	13	23	46	−23	31	Relegation to Ligue Professionnelle 2
15	NA Hussein Dey (R)	30	5	11	14	29	39	−10	26	Relegation to Ligue Professionnelle 2
16	MC Saïda (R)	30	6	6	18	28	46	−18	24	Relegation to Ligue Professionnelle 2

Updated to match(es) played on 19 April 2018. Source: DZFoot
Rules for classification: 1) points; 2) head-to-head points; 3) head-to-head goal difference; 4) goal difference; 5) total goals; 6) fairplay ranking; 7) playoff.
(C) Champions; (R) Relegated

== Season statistics ==
=== Top scorers ===
Rank	Scorer	Club	Goals
1	Mohamed Messaoud	ASO Chlef	15
2	Mohamed Amine Aoudia	ES Sétif	12
2	Ahmed Messadia	CA Batna	12
3	Djamel Bouaïcha	MC El Eulma	11
3	Lamouri Djediat	USM Alger	11
3	Ahmed Gasmi	JSM Béjaïa	11
4	Carolus Andriamatsinoro	WA Tlemcen	10
4	Moustapha Djallit	MC Alger	10
4	Mohamed Seguer	ASO Chlef	10
4	Islam Slimani	CR Belouizdad	10
5	Salim Hanifi	JS Kabylie	9
5	Réda Sayah	MC Alger	9
