= US Souf =

Algerian football club

- Full name: Union Sportive de Souf
- Founded: 1967; 59 years ago
- Ground: 20 August 1955 Stadium; 1 November 1954 Stadium
- Capacity: 9,000
- League: Inter-Régions Division
- 2024–25: Ligue 2, Group Centre-east, 16th (relegated)
Home colours	Away colours

Union Sportive de Souf (Arabic: الاتحاد الرياضي السوفي), known as US Souf or simply USS for short, is an Algerian football club based in El Oued in El Oued Province. The club was founded in 1967 and its colours are blue and white. Their home stadium, 20 August 1955 Stadium, has a capacity of 9,000 spectators. The club is currently playing in the Inter-Régions Division.

== History ==
On 38 May 2022, US Souf were promoted to the Algerian Ligue 2.

On 16 May 2023, US Souf were promoted to the Ligue 1 for the first time in history.
