= 2022–23 CS Constantine season =

CS Constantine
2022–23 season
- Owner: ENTP
- President: Mohamed Boulahbib
- Head coach: Kheïreddine Madoui (from 13 August 2022) (until 26 February 2023); Lyamine Bougherara (from 27 March 2023)
- Stadium: Ramadane Ben Abdelmalek Stadium
- Ligue 1: 2nd
- Algerian Cup: Round of 32
- Top goalscorer: League: Brahim Dib (8 goals); All: Brahim Dib (8 goals)
- Biggest win: NRB Nezla 1–4 CS Constantine
- Biggest defeat: JS Saoura 3–1 CS Constantine; MC El Bayadh 3–1 CS Constantine
Home colours	Away colours

The 2022–23 season, was CS Constantine's 27th season and the club's 12th consecutive season in the top flight of Algerian football. In addition to the domestic league, CS Constantine participated in the Algerian Cup.

== Squad list ==
Players and squad numbers last updated in 25 August 2022.
Note: Flags indicate national team as has been defined under FIFA eligibility rules. Players may hold more than one non-FIFA nationality.

No.	Nat.	Position	Name	Date of Birth (Age)	Signed from
Goalkeepers
1	(Algeria)	GK	Soufiane Abed	13 May 2000 (aged 22)	(Algeria) Youth system
16	(Algeria)	GK	Fares Boukerrit	9 March 1998 (aged 24)	(Algeria) ASM Oran
23	(Algeria)	GK	Chamseddine Rahmani	15 September 1990 (aged 32)	(Saudi Arabia) Damac
Defenders
4	(Algeria)	CB	Ali Abdeladim Mehazem	10 January 2000 (aged 22)	(Algeria) Youth system
5	(Algeria)	CB	Nasreddine Zaalani	26 July 1992 (aged 30)	(Saudi Arabia) Al-Kholood
12	(Algeria)	RB	Oussama Meddahi	14 February 1991 (aged 31)	(Algeria) NA Hussein Dey
17	(Algeria)	RB	Amir Belaili	10 February 1991 (aged 31)	(Algeria) AS Ain M'lila
19	(Algeria)	CB	Chamseddine Derradji	15 April 1992 (aged 30)	(Algeria) NC Magra
20	(Algeria)	CB	Mohamed Amine Madani	20 March 1992 (aged 30)	(Algeria) NC Magra
21	(Algeria)	RB	Hamza Rebiai	11 January 1994 (aged 28)	(Algeria) Olympique de Médéa
25	(Algeria)	LB	Seif Eddine Chettih	28 May 1991 (aged 31)	(Algeria) RC Relizane
26	(Algeria)	LB	Ahmed Maâmeri	25 June 1997 (aged 25)	(Algeria) WA Boufarik
Midfielders
6	(Algeria)	MF	Mohamed Benchaira	10 January 1992 (aged 30)	(Algeria) JS Kabylie
8	(Algeria)	MF	Samir Aiboud	11 February 1993 (aged 29)	(Algeria) CR Belouizdad
11	(Algeria)	MF	Aymane Issad Lakdja	16 October 1998 (aged 24)	(Algeria) NC Magra
13	(Algeria)	MF	Salaheddine Harrari	9 June 1998 (aged 24)	(Algeria) HB Chelghoum Laïd
14	(Algeria)	MF	Kamel Belmessaoud	28 November 1990 (aged 32)	(Algeria) JSM Béjaïa
15	(Algeria)	MF	Zakaria Messibah	16 October 1995 (aged 27)	(Algeria) Paradou AC
24	(Algeria)	MF	Zakaria Kemoukh	6 March 1992 (aged 30)	(Algeria) HB Chelghoum Laïd
Forwards
3	(Algeria)	FW	Hamza Demane	23 February 1989 (aged 33)	(Algeria) HB Chelghoum Laïd
7	(Benin)	FW	Marcellin Koukpo	6 April 1995 (aged 27)	(Algeria) CR Belouizdad
9	(Algeria)	FW	Abdelhak Abdelhafid	14 December 1991 (aged 31)	(Algeria) MC Alger
10	(Algeria)	FW	Brahim Dib	6 July 1993 (aged 29)	(Algeria) AS Ain M'lila
18	(Algeria)	FW	Nasreddine Bouldjedri	29 February 2000 (aged 22)	(Algeria) Youth system
22	(Algeria)	FW	Oualid Ardji	7 September 1995 (aged 27)	(Algeria) NA Hussein Dey
27	(Algeria)	FW	Ahmed Khaldi	22 July 1998 (aged 24)	(Algeria) HB Chelghoum Laïd

== Transfers ==
=== In ===
==== Summer ====
Date	Pos	Player	From club	Transfer fee	Source
1 July 2022	CB	(Algeria) Mohamed Amine Madani	NC Magra	Free transfer	
4 July 2022	FW	(Algeria) Ahmed Khaldi	HB Chelghoum Laïd	Free transfer	
13 July 2022	RB	(Algeria) Oussama Meddahi	NA Hussein Dey	Free transfer	
18 July 2022	MF	(Algeria) Salaheddine Harrari	HB Chelghoum Laïd	Free transfer	
20 July 2022	CB	(Algeria) Nasreddine Zaalani	(Saudi Arabia) Al-Kholood	Free transfer	
16 August 2022	FW	(Algeria) Hamza Demane	HB Chelghoum Laïd	Free transfer	
16 August 2022	FW	(Algeria) Abdelhak Abdelhafid	MC Alger	Free transfer	

=== Out ===
==== Summer ====
Date	Pos	Player	To club	Transfer fee	Source
13 June 2022	RB	(Algeria) Mohamed Guemroud	JS Kabylie	Free transfer	
13 June 2022	LB	(Algeria) Yassine Salhi	JS Kabylie	Free transfer	
3 July 2022	FW	(Algeria) Chouaib Debbih	MC Alger	Free transfer	
4 July 2022	FW	(Algeria) Hamza Belahouel	Unattached	Free transfer	
4 July 2022	FW	(Algeria) Okacha Hamzaoui	Unattached (Note: Guendouz joined Al-Fujairah SC on 27 July 2022.)	Free transfer	
4 July 2022	FW	(Algeria) Mohamed Itim	Unattached	Free transfer	
4 July 2022	GK	(Algeria) Hatem Bencheikh El Fegoun	Unattached	Free transfer	

== Competitions ==
=== Overview ===
Competition	Record								Started round	Final position / round	First match	Last match
Competition	G	W	D	L	GF	GA	GD	Win %	Started round	Final position / round	First match	Last match
Ligue 1	30	14	8	8	39	26	+13	46.67	—N/a	2nd	26 August 2022	15 July 2023
Algerian Cup	2	1	0	1	4	3	+1	50.00	Round of 64	Round of 32	16 December 2022	16 February 2023
Total	32	15	8	9	43	29	+14	46.88				

Updated to match played 15 July 2023
Source: Competitions

=== Ligue 1 ===
==== League table ====
Pos	Team	Pld	W	D	L	GF	GA	GD	Pts	Qualification or relegation
1	CR Belouizdad (C)	30	18	10	2	44	21	+23	64	Qualification for CAF Champions League
2	CS Constantine	30	14	8	8	39	26	+13	50	Qualification for CAF Champions League
3	MC Alger	30	12	11	7	21	20	+1	47	
4	MC El Bayadh	30	13	7	10	34	25	+9	46	
5	JS Saoura	30	11	9	10	32	25	+7	42	

Updated to match(es) played on 15 July 2023. Source: the-sports.org
Rules for classification: 1) points; 2) head-to-head points; 3) head-to-head goal difference; 4) goal difference; 5) total goals; 6) fairplay ranking; 7) playoff.
(C) Champions

==== Results summary ====
Overall								Home						Away					
Pld	W	D	L	GF	GA	GD	Pts	W	D	L	GF	GA	GD	W	D	L	GF	GA	GD
30	14	8	8	39	26	+13	50	11	3	1	24	5	+19	3	5	7	15	21	−6

Last updated: 15 July 2023.
Source: Competitive matches

==== Results by round ====
Round	1	2	3	4	5	6	7	8	9	10	11	12	13	14	15	16	17	18	19	20	21	22	23	24	25	26	27	28	29	30
Ground	H	A	H	A	H	A	H	A	H	A	H	A	H	H	A	A	H	A	H	A	H	A	H	A	H	A	H	A	A	H
Result	W	W	W	W	D	D	L	L	W	W	W	L	W	W	L	D	D	D	W	D	W	D	D	L	W	L	D	L	L	W
Position	2	2	2	1	2	3	3	4	3	2	2	2	2	2	2	2	2	2	2	2	2	2	2	2	2	2	2	2	2	2

Updated to match(es) played on 15 July 2023. Source: Competitive matches
A = Away; H = Home; W = Win; D = Draw; L = Loss

==== Matches ====
The league fixtures were announced on 19 July 2022.

26 August 2022 Round 1	CS Constantine	3–1	USM Khenchela	Constantine
16:45	Dib 24'; Koukpo 63'; Khaldi 70'	Report	Sameur 49' (pen.)	Stadium: Ramadane Ben Abdelmalek Stadium; Referee: Lotfi Bekouassa

1 September 2022 Round 2	JS Kabylie	0–1	CS Constantine	Tizi Ouzou
20:00		Report	Koukpo 12'	Stadium: 1 November 1954 Stadium; Referee: Ali Nader

10 September 2022 Round 3	CS Constantine	2–0	HB Chelghoum Laïd	Constantine
16:30	Khaldi 39'; Dib 90+3'	Report		Stadium: Ramadane Ben Abdelmalek Stadium; Referee: Bilal Soltani

17 September 2022 Round 4	Paradou AC	0–1	CS Constantine	Dar El Beïda
16:30		Report	Ardji 67'	Stadium: Omar Benrabah Stadium; Referee: Mustapha Ghorbal

24 September 2022 Round 5	CS Constantine	0–0	MC Oran	Constantine
16:30		Report		Stadium: Ramadane Ben Abdelmalek Stadium; Referee: Anes Azrine

2 October 2022 Round 6	ES Sétif	0–0	CS Constantine	Sétif
18:00		Report		Stadium: 8 May 1945 Stadium; Referee: Lotfi Bekouassa

8 October 2022 Round 7	CS Constantine	0–2	MC Alger	Constantine
15:00		Report	Merzougui 16', 19'	Stadium: Ramadane Ben Abdelmalek Stadium; Referee: Mustapha Ghorbal

21 October 2022 Round 9	CS Constantine	2–1	US Biskra	Constantine
15:00	Koukpo 15'; Abdelhafid 47'	Report	Zeghnoun 18'	Stadium: Ramadane Ben Abdelmalek Stadium; Referee: Lyes Bekouassa

5 November 2022 Round 10	RC Arbaâ	1–2	CS Constantine	Larbaâ
15:00	Toumi 26'	Report	Koukpo 17'; Abdelhafid 31'	Stadium: Ismaïl Makhlouf Stadium; Referee: Mohamed Cherif Bouteraa

9 November 2022 Round 11	CS Constantine	1–0	NC Magra	Constantine
15:00	Lakdja 50'	Report		Stadium: Ramadane Ben Abdelmalek Stadium; Referee: Akram Mecharia

29 November 2022 Round 12	CR Belouizdad	2–1	CS Constantine	Belouizdad
15:00	Belkhir 24', 83'	Report	Lakdja 39'	Stadium: 20 August 1955 Stadium; Referee: Abdellah Benchehida

3 December 2022 Round 8	JS Saoura	3–1	CS Constantine	Béchar
17:00	Bellatreche 12', 21'; Saadi 60'	Report	Koukpo 58'	Stadium: 20 August 1955 Stadium; Referee: Bilal Bendjahene

7 December 2022 Round 13	CS Constantine	3–0	ASO Chlef	Constantine
15:00	Madani 50', 90+2'; Khaldi 68'	Report		Stadium: Ramadane Ben Abdelmalek Stadium; Referee: Hamza Bouslimani

11 December 2022 Round 14	CS Constantine	3–1	MC El Bayadh	Constantine
15:00	Dib 45+5'; Aiboud 66', 75'	Report	Hitala 8'	Stadium: Ramadane Ben Abdelmalek Stadium; Referee: Zinelaabidine Dakhane

24 December 2022 Round 15	USM Alger	2–1	CS Constantine	Dar El Beïda
14:30	Ait El Hadj 42'; Mahious 79' (pen.)	Report	Aiboud 66'	Stadium: Omar Benrabah Stadium; Referee: Youcef Tayeb Bouderbali

10 February 2023 Round 16	USM Khenchela	1–1	CS Constantine	Khenchela
15:00	Athmani 5'	Report	Madani 90+2'	Stadium: Amar Hamam Stadium; Referee: Lyes Bekouassa

24 February 2023 Round 18	HB Chelghoum Laïd	1–1	CS Constantine	Chelghoum Laïd
15:00	Himri 80'	Report	Madani 72' (pen.)	Stadium: 11 December 1961 Stadium; Referee: Zakaria Antar

7 March 2023 Round 17	CS Constantine	0–0	JS Kabylie	Constantine
15:00		Report		Stadium: Ramadane Ben Abdelmalek Stadium; Referee: Mehadji Tayeb Bouderbali

17 March 2023 Round 20	MC Oran	0–0	CS Constantine	Oran
15:00		Report		Stadium: Ahmed Zabana Stadium; Referee: Bilal Soltani

31 March 2023 Round 21	CS Constantine	2–0	ES Sétif	Constantine
15:45	Khaldi 4'; Ardji 37'	Report		Stadium: Ramadane Ben Abdelmalek Stadium; Referee: Nabil Boukhalfa

7 April 2023 Round 22	MC Alger	0–0	CS Constantine	Algiers
22:30		Report		Stadium: Stade du 5 Juillet; Referee: Mohamed Bouteraa

18 April 2023 Round 19	CS Constantine	1–0	Paradou AC	Constantine
15:45	Mokeddem 48' (o.g.)	Report		Stadium: Ramadane Ben Abdelmalek Stadium; Referee: Abdellah Benchehida

17 May 2023 Round 23	CS Constantine	2–0	JS Saoura	Constantine
16:00	Madani 23'; Dib 61' (pen.)	Report		Stadium: Ramadane Ben Abdelmalek Stadium; Referee: Lyes Bekouassa

31 May 2023 Round 24	US Biskra	3–2	CS Constantine	Biskra
18:00	Zeghnoun 4'; Boussalem 24', 45'	Report	Benchaira 20'; Dib 90'	Stadium: 18 February Stadium; Referee: Lotfi Bekouassa

6 June 2023 Round 25	CS Constantine	2–0	RC Arbaâ	Constantine
16:30	Maâmeri 11', 28'	Report		Stadium: Ramadane Ben Abdelmalek Stadium; Referee: Nabil Boukhalfa

1 July 2023 Round 26	NC Magra	2–1	CS Constantine	Magra
17:00	Bourahla 2'; Amrane 55' (pen.)	Report	Zaalani 28'	Stadium: Boucheligue Brothers Stadium; Referee: Lahlou Benbraham

4 July 2023 Round 27	CS Constantine	0–0	CR Belouizdad	Constantine
17:00		Report		Stadium: Ramadane Ben Abdelmalek Stadium; Referee: Houssam Benyahia

7 July 2023 Round 28	ASO Chlef	3–2	CS Constantine	Chlef
17:15	Kerroum 15'; Souibaâh 25', 53'	Report	Abdelhafid 49'; Dib 84' (pen.)	Stadium: Mohamed Boumezrag Stadium; Referee: Anes Azrine

10 July 2023 Round 29	MC El Bayadh	3–1	CS Constantine	El Bayadh
17:15	Khalfallah 18'; Barka 34'; Hitala 60'	Report	Dib 12' (pen.)	Stadium: Zakaria Medjdoub Stadium; Referee: Hamza Bouslimani

15 July 2023 Round 30	CS Constantine	3–0	USM Alger	Constantine
17:15	Maâmeri 14'; Dib 33' (pen.); Khaldi 77'	Report		Stadium: Ramadane Ben Abdelmalek Stadium; Referee: Abdellah Benchehida

=== Algerian Cup ===
16 December 2022 Round of 64	NRB Nezla	1–4	CS Constantine	Touggourt
14:00	Kerboussa 60'	Report	Khaldi 11'; Aiboud 19'; Demane 35', 43'	Stadium: 10000 Places Stadium; Referee: Mohamed Saidi
Note: Lineups for CS Constantine - Boukerrit, Belaili, Rebiai, Madani (Derradji, 69'), Chettih, Chekal, Belmessaoud (Bendaoud, 46'), Aiboud, Lakdja, Khaldi (Harrari, 46'), Demane.

16 February 2023 Round of 32	Paradou AC	2–0	CS Constantine	Dar El Beïda
14:30	Bouzida 50'; Berkoune 90+5'	Report		Stadium: Omar Benrabah Stadium; Referee: Bilal Soltani
Note: Lineups for CS Constantine - Rahmani, Meddahi, Maâmeri, Madani, Zaalani, Benchaira, Belmessaoud (Messibah, 75'), Ardji, Abdelhafid, Khaldi (Demane, 75'), Koukpo (Harrari, 67').

== Squad information ==
=== Playing statistics ===
No.	Pos	Nat	Player	Total		Ligue 1		Algerian Cup	
No.	Pos	Nat	Player	Apps	Goals	Apps	Goals	Apps	Goals
Goalkeepers
1	GK	(Algeria) ALG	Soufiane Abed	2	0	2	0	0	0
16	GK	(Algeria) ALG	Fares Boukerrit	5	0	4	0	1	0
23	GK	(Algeria) ALG	Chamseddine Rahmani	27	0	26	0	1	0
Defenders
4	DF	(Algeria) ALG	Ali Abdeladim Mehazem	0	0	0	0	0	0
5	DF	(Algeria) ALG	Nasreddine Zaalani	20	1	19	1	1	0
12	DF	(Algeria) ALG	Oussama Meddahi	24	0	23	0	1	0
17	DF	(Algeria) ALG	Amir Belaili	23	0	22	0	1	0
19	DF	(Algeria) ALG	Chamseddine Derradji	19	0	18	0	1	0
20	DF	(Algeria) ALG	Mohamed Amine Madani	30	5	28	5	2	0
21	DF	(Algeria) ALG	Hamza Rebai	4	0	3	0	1	0
25	DF	(Algeria) ALG	Seif Eddine Chettih	5	0	4	0	1	0
26	DF	(Algeria) ALG	Ahmed Maâmeri	29	0	26	0	3	0
Midfielders
6	MF	(Algeria) ALG	Mohamed Benchaira	24	1	23	1	1	0
8	MF	(Algeria) ALG	Samir Aiboud	11	4	10	3	1	1
11	MF	(Algeria) ALG	Aymane Issad Lakdja	20	2	19	2	1	0
13	MF	(Algeria) ALG	Salaheddine Harrari	15	0	13	0	2	0
14	MF	(Algeria) ALG	Kamel Belmessaoud	20	0	18	0	2	0
15	MF	(Algeria) ALG	Zakaria Messibah	20	0	19	0	1	0
24	MF	(Algeria) ALG	Zakaria Kemoukh	14	0	14	0	0	0
47	MF	(Algeria) ALG	Belhadj Chekal	15	0	14	0	1	0
48	MF	(Algeria) ALG	Aymen Bendaoud	3	0	2	0	1	0
Forwards
3	FW	(Algeria) ALG	Hamza Demane	17	2	15	0	2	2
7	FW	(Benin) BEN	Marcellin Koukpo	27	5	26	5	1	0
9	FW	(Algeria) ALG	Abdelhak Abdelhafid	19	3	18	3	1	0
10	FW	(Algeria) ALG	Brahim Dib	13	3	13	3	0	0
18	FW	(Algeria) ALG	Nasreddine Bouldjedri	9	0	9	0	0	0
22	FW	(Algeria) ALG	Oualid Ardji	26	2	25	2	1	0
27	FW	(Algeria) ALG	Ahmed Khaldi	27	6	25	5	2	1
71	FW	(Algeria) ALG	Mounder Temine	7	0	7	0	0	0
Players transferred out during the season

Last updated: 15 July 2023
Source: soccerway.com

=== Goalscorers ===
As of 15 July 2023

Includes all competitive matches. The list is sorted alphabetically by surname when total goals are equal.

No.	Nat.	Player	Pos.	L 1	AC	TOTAL
10	(Algeria)	Brahim Dib	FW	8	0	8
27	(Algeria)	Ahmed Khaldi	FW	5	1	6
7	(Benin)	Marcellin Koukpo	FW	5	0	5
20	(Algeria)	Mohamed Amine Madani	DF	5	0	5
8	(Algeria)	Samir Aiboud	MF	3	1	4
9	(Algeria)	Abdelhak Abdelhafid	FW	3	0	3
26	(Algeria)	Ahmed Maâmeri	DF	3	0	3
11	(Algeria)	Aymane Issad Lakdja	MF	2	0	2
22	(Algeria)	Oualid Ardji	FW	2	0	2
3	(Algeria)	Hamza Demane	FW	0	2	2
6	(Algeria)	Mohamed Benchaira	MF	1	0	1
5	(Algeria)	Nasreddine Zaalani	DF	1	0	1
Own Goals				1	0	1
Totals				39	4	43
