= 2021–22 CS Constantine season =

CS Constantine
2021–22 season
- Owner: ENTP
- Head coach: Chérif Hadjar (from 4 September 2021) (until 15 February 2022); Kheïreddine Madoui (from 1 March 2022)
- Stadium: Stade Ramdane Benabdelmalek
- Ligue 1: 5th
- Top goalscorer: League: Marcellin Koukpo (11 goals); All: Marcellin Koukpo (11 goals)
- Biggest win: 5–0 vs RC Arbaâ (H) (13 March 2022)
- Biggest defeat: 0–2 vs USM Alger (A) (20 May 2022)
| Home colours | Away colours | Third colours |

In the 2021–22 season, CS Constantine competed in the Ligue 1 for the 26th season. It is their 11th consecutive season in the top flight of Algerian football.

== Squad list ==
Players and squad numbers last updated on 20 October 2021.
Note: Flags indicate national team as has been defined under FIFA eligibility rules. Players may hold more than one non-FIFA nationality.

| No. | Nat. | Position | Name | Date of Birth (Age) | Signed from |
Goalkeepers
| 1 | (Algeria) | GK | Hatem Bencheikh El Fegoun | 3 November 1999 (aged 22) | (Algeria) Youth system |
| 16 | (Algeria) | GK | Fares Boukerrit | 9 March 1998 (aged 23) | (Algeria) ASM Oran |
| 23 | (Algeria) | GK | Chamseddine Rahmani | 15 September 1990 (aged 31) | (Saudi Arabia) Damac |
Defenders
| 3 | (Algeria) | LB | Yacine Salhi | 19 December 1993 (aged 28) | (Algeria) MO Béjaïa |
| 5 | (Algeria) | CB | Zidane Mebarakou | 3 January 1989 (aged 32) | (Algeria) MC Alger |
| 12 | (Algeria) | RB | Mohamed Guemroud | 28 August 1994 (aged 27) | (Algeria) AS Ain M'lila |
| 17 | (Algeria) | RB | Zineddine Benyahia | 20 February 1990 (aged 31) | (Algeria) AS Ain M'lila |
| 19 | (Algeria) | CB | Chamseddine Derradji | 15 April 1992 (aged 29) | (Algeria) NC Magra |
| 21 | (Algeria) | RB | Hamza Rebiai | 11 January 1994 (aged 27) | (Algeria) Olympique de Médéa |
| 24 | (Algeria) | CB | Mohammed Hamza | 1 January 1995 (aged 27) | (Algeria) USM Bel Abbès |
| 26 | (Algeria) | LB | Ahmed Maâmeri | 25 June 1997 (aged 24) | (Algeria) WA Boufarik |
| 27 | (Algeria) | RB | Amir Belaili | 10 February 1991 (aged 30) | (Algeria) AS Ain M'lila |
Midfielders
| 6 | (Algeria) | MF | Mohamed Benchaira | 10 January 1992 (aged 29) | (Algeria) JS Kabylie |
| 8 | (Algeria) | MF | Samir Aiboud | 11 February 1993 (aged 28) | (Algeria) CR Belouizdad |
| 11 | (Algeria) | MF | Aymane Issad Lakdja | 16 October 1998 (aged 23) | (Algeria) NC Magra |
| 15 | (Algeria) | MF | Zakaria Messibah | 16 October 1995 (aged 26) | (Algeria) Paradou AC |
| 14 | (Algeria) | MF | Kamel Belmessaoud | 28 November 1990 (aged 31) | (Algeria) JSM Béjaïa |
| 18 | (Sudan) | MF | Sharaf Eldin Shiboub | 7 June 1994 (aged 27) | (Tanzania) Simba Sports Club |
Forwards
| 7 | (Benin) | FW | Marcellin Koukpo | 6 April 1995 (aged 26) | (Algeria) CR Belouizdad |
| 9 | (Algeria) | FW | Okacha Hamzaoui | 29 November 1990 (aged 31) | (Iran) Tractor |
| 10 | (Algeria) | FW | Chouaib Debbih | 1 January 1993 (aged 29) | (Algeria) AS Ain M'lila |
| 13 | (Algeria) | FW | Mohamed Itim | 10 January 1997 (aged 24) | (Algeria) USM Bel Abbès |
| 20 | (Algeria) | FW | Hamza Belahouel | 8 June 1993 (aged 28) | (Algeria) CR Belouizdad |
| 22 | (Algeria) | FW | Ilyes Yaiche | 27 October 1997 (aged 24) | (Algeria) USM Alger |
| 25 | (Algeria) | FW | Brahim Dib | 6 July 1993 (aged 28) | (Algeria) AS Ain M'lila |

== Competitions ==
=== Overview ===
| Competition | Record | | | | | | | | Started round | Final position / round | First match | Last match |
| Competition | G | W | D | L | GF | GA | GD | Win % | Started round | Final position / round | First match | Last match |
|---|---|---|---|---|---|---|---|---|---|---|---|---|
| Ligue 1 | 34 | 15 | 10 | 9 | 46 | 29 | +17 | 44.12 | —N/a | 5th | 22 October 2021 | 11 June 2022 |
| Total | 34 | 15 | 10 | 9 | 46 | 29 | +17 | 44.12 | | | | |

Updated to match played 11 June 2022
Source: Competitions

== League table ==
| Pos | Team | Pld | W | D | L | GF | GA | GD | Pts | Qualification or relegation |
|---|---|---|---|---|---|---|---|---|---|---|
| 3 | JS Saoura | 34 | 17 | 9 | 8 | 59 | 23 | +36 | 60 | Qualification for CAF Confederation Cup |
| 4 | USM Alger | 34 | 15 | 12 | 7 | 45 | 22 | +23 | 57 | Qualification for CAF Confederation Cup |
| 5 | CS Constantine | 34 | 15 | 10 | 9 | 46 | 29 | +17 | 55 | |
| 6 | Paradou AC | 34 | 16 | 6 | 12 | 43 | 36 | +7 | 54 (Note: Paradou AC finished ahead of ES Sétif on head-to-head points: Paradou AC 1–0 ES Sétif, ES Sétif 0–1 Paradou AC.) | |
| 7 | ES Sétif | 34 | 15 | 9 | 10 | 43 | 24 | +19 | 54 | |

Updated to match(es) played on 17 June 2022. Source: the-sports.org
Rules for classification: 1) points; 2) head-to-head points; 3) head-to-head goal difference; 4) goal difference; 5) total goals; 6) fairplay ranking; 7) playoff.

=== Results summary ===
| Overall | | | | | | | | Home | | | | | | Away | | | | | |
| Pld | W | D | L | GF | GA | GD | Pts | W | D | L | GF | GA | GD | W | D | L | GF | GA | GD |
|---|---|---|---|---|---|---|---|---|---|---|---|---|---|---|---|---|---|---|---|
| 34 | 15 | 10 | 9 | 46 | 29 | +17 | 55 | 11 | 4 | 2 | 29 | 10 | +19 | 4 | 6 | 7 | 17 | 19 | −2 |

Last updated: 11 June 2022.
Source: Competitive matches

=== Results by round ===
| Round | 1 | 2 | 3 | 4 | 5 | 6 | 7 | 8 | 9 | 10 | 11 | 12 | 13 | 14 | 15 | 16 | 17 | 18 | 19 | 20 | 21 | 22 | 23 | 24 | 25 | 26 | 27 | 28 | 29 | 30 | 31 | 32 | 33 | 34 |
|---|---|---|---|---|---|---|---|---|---|---|---|---|---|---|---|---|---|---|---|---|---|---|---|---|---|---|---|---|---|---|---|---|---|---|
| Ground | H | A | H | A | H | A | A | H | A | H | A | H | A | H | A | H | A | A | H | A | H | A | H | H | A | H | A | H | A | H | A | H | A | H |
| Result | L | D | W | W | W | D | D | W | L | W | W | W | L | D | D | W | L | L | L | D | W | D | W | W | L | W | W | D | L | D | L | D | W | W |
| Position | 13 | 14 | 10 | 7 | 5 | 6 | 8 | 4 | 7 | 5 | 5 | 2 | 5 | 7 | 6 | 6 | 7 | 9 | 9 | 9 | 8 | 7 | 7 | 5 | 6 | 6 | 5 | 6 | 6 | 8 | 8 | 7 | 6 | 5 |

Updated to match(es) played on 11 June 2022. Source: Competitive matches
A = Away; H = Home; W = Win; D = Draw; L = Loss

=== Matches ===
The league fixtures were announced on 7 October 2021.

| 22 October 2021 Round 1 | CS Constantine | 0–1 | MC Oran | Constantine |
| 15:30 | | Report | Yadaden 57' | Stadium: Stade Ramdane Benabdelmalek; Attendance: 0 (Note: The match was played behind closed doors due to the COVID-19 pandemic in Algeria.); Referee: Hamza Bouslimani |

| 29 October 2021 Round 2 | CR Belouizdad | 1–1 | CS Constantine | Belouizdad |
| 15:00 | Merzougui 85' | Report | Koukpo 18' | Stadium: Stade 20 Août 1955; Attendance: 0 (close doors); Referee: Bilal Bendjahene |

| 6 November 2021 Round 3 | CS Constantine | 1–0 | NC Magra | Constantine |
| 15:00 | Yaiche 85' | Report | | Stadium: Stade Ramdane Benabdelmalek; Referee: Youcef Taieb Bouderbal |

| 20 November 2021 Round 4 | WA Tlemcen | 0–2 | CS Constantine | Tlemcen |
| 15:00 | | Report | Hamzaoui 47', 58' | Stadium: Stade Akid Lotfi; Referee: Amine Sekhraoui |

| 25 November 2021 Round 5 | CS Constantine | 3–0 | MC Alger | Constantine |
| 14:30 | Debbih 34'; Belahouel 85'; Salhi 90+3' (pen.) | Report | | Stadium: Stade Ramdane Benabdelmalek; Referee: Ali Nader |

| 3 December 2021 Round 6 | RC Relizane | 1–1 | CS Constantine | Relizane |
| 15:00 | Meguenine 54' | Report | Debbih 33' | Stadium: Stade Tahar Zoughari; Referee: Malek Ait Ameur |

| 18 December 2021 Round 8 | CS Constantine | 1–0 | Olympique de Médéa | Constantine |
| 14:30 | Debbih 28' | Report | | Stadium: Stade Ramdane Benabdelmalek; Referee: Mohamed Saïdi |

| 24 December 2021 Round 9 | ES Sétif | 1–0 | CS Constantine | Sétif |
| 16:00 | Motrani 24' | Report | | Stadium: Stade 8 Mai 1945; Attendance: 0 (close doors); Referee: Hamza Bouslimani |

| 28 December 2021 Round 10 | CS Constantine | 2–1 | NA Hussein Dey | Constantine |
| 14:30 | Koukpo 76', 89' | Report | Banouh 73' | Stadium: Stade Ramdane Benabdelmalek; Referee: Bilal Bendjahene |

| 2 January 2022 Round 11 | RC Arbaâ | 0–1 | CS Constantine | Boufarik |
| 14:00 | | Report | Benchaira 83' | Stadium: Stade Mohamed Reggaz; Referee: Ali Nader |

| 7 January 2022 Round 12 | CS Constantine | 1–0 | JS Saoura | Constantine |
| 15:00 | Belahouel 68' | Report | | Stadium: Stade Ramdane Benabdelmalek; Referee: Lyés Bekouassa |

| 16 January 2022 Round 13 | US Biskra | 2–0 | CS Constantine | Biskra |
| 15:00 | Boukarroum 42'; Mokhtar 66' | Report | | Stadium: 18 February Stadium; Referee: Mohamed Boutaraa |

| 21 January 2022 Round 14 | CS Constantine | 1–1 | USM Alger | Constantine |
| 14:30 | Belahouel (penalty missed) 16'; Mebarakou (yellow card) 26' (yellow-red card) 46'; Koukpo 90+4' | Report | Zouari 27' (yellow card) 76'; Bouchina (yellow card) 56'; Benbot (yellow card) 90+2' | Stadium: Ramadan Ben-Abdelmalek Stadium; Referee: Mohamed Saidi |

| 25 January 2022 Round 15 | HB Chelghoum Laïd | 1–1 | CS Constantine | Chelghoum Laïd |
| 14:30 | Benamrane 31' | Report | Koukpo 6' | Stadium: 11 December 1961 Stadium; Referee: Lotfi Bekouassa |

| 30 January 2022 Round 16 | CS Constantine | 2–1 | JS Kabylie | Constantine |
| 14:30 | Koukpo 13'; Temine 30' | Report | Oukaci 37' | Stadium: Ramadan Ben-Abdelmalek Stadium; Referee: Youcef Taieb Bouderbal |

| 3 February 2022 Round 7 | Paradou AC | 1–1 | CS Constantine | Dar El Beïda |
| 14:30 | Benbouali 41' | Report | Koukpo 24' | Stadium: Omar Benrabah Stadium; Attendance: 0 (close doors); Referee: Abdellah Benchehida |

| 7 February 2022 Round 17 | ASO Chlef | 1–0 | CS Constantine | Chlef |
| 17:00 | Alili 66' | Report | | Stadium: Stade Mohamed Boumezrag; Referee: Hamza Boucetta |

| 25 February 2022 Round 18 | MC Oran | 2–1 | CS Constantine | Oran |
| 15:00 | Belmokhtar 2'; Djabout 10' (pen.) | Report | Koukpo 52' | Stadium: Ahmed Zabana Stadium; Referee: Lotfi Bekouassa |

| 3 March 2022 Round 19 | CS Constantine | 1–2 | CR Belouizdad | Constantine |
| 14:30 | Aiboud 14' | Report | Merzougui 73'; Belkhiter 90+8' (pen.) | Stadium: Stade Ramdane Benabdelmalek; Referee: Mohamed Saïdi |

| 7 March 2022 Round 20 | NC Magra | 1–1 | CS Constantine | Magra |
| 14:30 | Ghanem 10' | Report | Ardji 83' | Stadium: Boucheligue Brothers Stadium; Referee: Lahlou Benbraham |

| 13 March 2022 Round 21 | CS Constantine | 5–0 | WA Tlemcen | Constantine |
| 14:30 | Belaili 32'; Koukpo 47'; Lakdja 50'; Salhi 57' (pen.); Aiboud 81' | Report | | Stadium: Stade Ramdane Benabdelmalek; Referee: Riadh Ammar Khodja |

| 19 March 2022 Round 22 | MC Alger | 0–0 | CS Constantine | Algiers |
| 15:00 | | Report | | Stadium: Stade du 5 Juillet; Attendance: 0 (close doors); Referee: Nabil Boukhalfa |

| 26 March 2022 Round 23 | CS Constantine | 4–0 | RC Relizane | Constantine |
| 15:00 | Belahouel 34'; Lakdja 47'; Dib 56'; Hamzaoui 86' | Report | | Stadium: Stade Ramdane Benabdelmalek; Referee: Hamza Boucetta |

| 1 April 2022 Round 24 | CS Constantine | 1–0 | Paradou AC | Constantine |
| 16:00 | Ardji 77' | Report | | Stadium: Stade Ramdane Benabdelmalek; Referee: Said Aouina |

| 12 April 2022 Round 25 | Olympique de Médéa | 2–1 | CS Constantine | Médéa |
| 16:45 | Gagaa 49'; Baâli 66' | Report | Mebarakou 88' (pen.) | Stadium: Stade Imam Lyes; Referee: Lyés Bekouassa |

| 22 April 2022 Round 27 | NA Hussein Dey | 1–4 | CS Constantine | Belouizdad |
| 23:30 | Benayad 37' (pen.) | Report | Dib 34', 44' (pen.); Aiboud 58'; Koukpo 70' | Stadium: Stade 20 Août 1955; Attendance: 0 (close doors); Referee: Mohamed Boutaraa |

| 29 April 2022 Round 28 | CS Constantine | 1–1 | RC Arbaâ | Constantine |
| 16:45 | Dib 42' | Report | Toumi Sief 2' | Stadium: Stade Ramdane Benabdelmalek; Referee: Mustapha Ghorbal |

| 7 May 2022 Round 29 | JS Saoura | 2–0 | CS Constantine | Béchar |
| 17:30 | Lahmeri 75' (pen.); Hammia 90+5' | Report | | Stadium: Stade 20 Août 1955; Referee: Ali Nader |

| 14 May 2022 Round 30 | CS Constantine | 0–0 | US Biskra | Constantine |
| 16:00 | | Report | | Stadium: Stade Ramdane Benabdelmalek; Referee: Hamza Bouslimani |

| 20 May 2022 Round 31 | USM Alger | 2–0 | CS Constantine | Bologhine |
| 18:00 | Alilet (yellow card) 47'; Benhammouda 53'; Meziane 67' | Report | Lakdja (yellow card) 47' | Stadium: Omar Hamadi Stadium; Attendance: 0 (close doors); Referee: Nabil Boukhalfa |

| 27 May 2022 Round 32 | CS Constantine | 3–3 | HB Chelghoum Laïd | Constantine |
| 16:45 | Lakdja 3'; Koukpo 28'; Aiboud 82' | Report | Demane 4', 89'; Khaldi 27' | Stadium: Stade Ramdane Benabdelmalek; Referee: Lyés Bekouassa |

| 1 June 2022 Round 26 | CS Constantine | 1–0 | ES Sétif | Constantine |
| 16:45 | Ardji 60' | Report | | Stadium: Stade Ramdane Benabdelmalek; Referee: Abderrezzak Arab |

| 5 June 2022 Round 33 | JS Kabylie | 1–3 | CS Constantine | Tizi Ouzou |
| 19:00 | Mouaki 49' | Report | Ardji 24'; Dib 78' (pen.); Bouldjedri 83' | Stadium: Stade 1er Novembre 1954; Referee: Bilal Bendjahene |

| 11 June 2022 Round 34 | CS Constantine | 2–0 | ASO Chlef | Constantine |
| 16:45 | Zermane 12'; Bouldjedri 27' | Report | | Stadium: Stade Ramdane Benabdelmalek; Referee: Amine Sekhraoui |

== Squad information ==
=== Playing statistics ===
| No. | Pos | Nat | Player | Total | | Ligue 1 | |
| No. | Pos | Nat | Player | Apps | Goals | Apps | Goals |
Goalkeepers
| 1 | GK | (Algeria) ALG | Hatem Bencheikh El Fegoun | 1 | 0 | 1 | 0 |
| 16 | GK | (Algeria) ALG | Fares Boukerrit | 9 | 0 | 9 | 0 |
| 23 | GK | (Algeria) ALG | Chamseddine Rahmani | 25 | 0 | 25 | 0 |
Defenders
| 2 | DF | (Algeria) ALG | Seif Eddine Chettih | 12 | 0 | 12 | 0 |
| 3 | DF | (Algeria) ALG | Yassine Salhi | 19 | 2 | 19 | 2 |
| 5 | DF | (Algeria) ALG | Zidane Mebarakou | 28 | 1 | 28 | 1 |
| 12 | DF | (Algeria) ALG | Mohamed Guemroud | 29 | 0 | 29 | 0 |
| 19 | DF | (Algeria) ALG | Chamseddine Derradji | 25 | 0 | 25 | 0 |
| 21 | DF | (Algeria) ALG | Hamza Rebai | 29 | 0 | 29 | 0 |
| 26 | DF | (Algeria) ALG | Ahmed Maâmeri | 6 | 0 | 6 | 0 |
| 27 | DF | (Algeria) ALG | Amir Belaili | 17 | 1 | 17 | 1 |
| 42 | DF | (Algeria) ALG | Islam Zermane | 2 | 1 | 2 | 1 |
Midfielders
| 4 | MF | (Algeria) ALG | Zakaria Kemoukh | 11 | 0 | 11 | 0 |
| 6 | MF | (Algeria) ALG | Mohamed Benchaira | 29 | 1 | 29 | 1 |
| 8 | MF | (Algeria) ALG | Samir Aiboud | 26 | 4 | 26 | 4 |
| 14 | MF | (Algeria) ALG | Kamel Belmessaoud | 15 | 0 | 15 | 0 |
| 15 | MF | (Algeria) ALG | Zakaria Messibah | 25 | 0 | 25 | 0 |
| 71 | MF | (Algeria) ALG | Mounder Temine | 13 | 1 | 13 | 1 |
Forwards
| 7 | FW | (Benin) BEN | Marcellin Koukpo | 27 | 11 | 27 | 11 |
| 9 | FW | (Algeria) ALG | Okacha Hamzaoui | 22 | 3 | 22 | 3 |
| 10 | FW | (Algeria) ALG | Chouaib Debbih | 25 | 3 | 25 | 3 |
| 11 | FW | (Algeria) ALG | Aymane Issad Lakdja | 15 | 3 | 15 | 3 |
| 13 | FW | (Algeria) ALG | Mohamed Itim | 0 | 0 | 0 | 0 |
| 20 | FW | (Algeria) ALG | Hamza Belahouel | 23 | 3 | 23 | 3 |
| 22 | FW | (Algeria) ALG | Oualid Ardji | 9 | 4 | 9 | 4 |
| 25 | FW | (Algeria) ALG | Brahim Dib | 30 | 5 | 30 | 5 |
| 72 | FW | (Algeria) ALG | Nasreddine Bouldjedri | 14 | 2 | 14 | 2 |
Players transferred out during the season
| 22 | FW | (Algeria) ALG | Ilyes Yaiche | 10 | 1 | 10 | 1 |

Last updated: 11 June 2022
Source: fr.soccerway.com

=== Goalscorers ===
Includes all competitive matches. The list is sorted alphabetically by surname when total goals are equal.

| No. | Nat. | Player | Pos. | L 1 | TOTAL |
|---|---|---|---|---|---|
| 7 | (Benin) | Marcellin Koukpo | FW | 11 | 11 |
| 25 | (Algeria) | Brahim Dib | FW | 5 | 5 |
| 8 | (Algeria) | Samir Aiboud | MF | 4 | 4 |
| 22 | (Algeria) | Oualid Ardji | FW | 4 | 4 |
| 20 | (Algeria) | Hamza Belahouel | FW | 3 | 3 |
| 11 | (Algeria) | Aymane Issad Lakdja | FW | 3 | 3 |
| 10 | (Algeria) | Chouaib Debbih | FW | 3 | 3 |
| 9 | (Algeria) | Okacha Hamzaoui | FW | 3 | 3 |
| 3 | (Algeria) | Yassine Salhi | DF | 2 | 2 |
| 72 | (Algeria) | Nasreddine Bouldjedri | FW | 2 | 2 |
| 5 | (Algeria) | Zidane Mebarakou | DF | 1 | 1 |
| 27 | (Algeria) | Amir Belaili | DF | 1 | 1 |
| 6 | (Algeria) | Mohamed Benchaira | MF | 1 | 1 |
| 71 | (Algeria) | Mounder Temine | MF | 1 | 1 |
| 22 | (Algeria) | Ilyes Yaiche | FW | 1 | 1 |
| 42 | (Algeria) | Islam Zermane | DF | 1 | 1 |
| Own Goals | | | | 0 | 0 |
| Totals | | | | 46 | 46 |

== Transfers ==
=== In ===
| Date | Pos | Player | From club | Transfer fee | Source |
|---|---|---|---|---|---|
| 17 July 2021 | MF | (Algeria) Hadji Chekkal | Reserve team | First Professional Contract | |
| 13 August 2021 | DM | (Algeria) Mohamed Benchaira | JS Kabylie | Free transfer | |
| 18 August 2021 | FW | (Algeria) Hamza Belahouel | CR Belouizdad | Free transfer | |
| 31 August 2021 | DM | (Algeria) Zakaria Messibah | Paradou AC | Loan for one year | |
| 2 September 2021 | DM | (Algeria) Chouaib Debbih | AS Aïn M'lila | Free transfer | |
| 2 September 2021 | ST | (Benin) Marcellin Koukpo | CR Belouizdad | Free transfer | |
| 4 September 2021 | CM | (Algeria) Samir Aiboud | CR Belouizdad | Free transfer | |
| 8 September 2021 | LB | (Algeria) Amir Belaili | AS Aïn M'lila | Free transfer | |
| 8 September 2021 | FW | (Algeria) Mohamed Itim | USM Bel Abbès | Free transfer | |
| 9 September 2021 | CB | (Algeria) Mohammed Hamza | USM Bel Abbès | Free transfer | |
| 10 September 2021 | GK | (Algeria) Fares Boukerrit | ASM Oran | Free transfer | |
| 16 September 2021 | FW | (Algeria) Okacha Hamzaoui | Unattached | Free transfer | |
| 29 September 2021 | RB | (Algeria) Hamza Rebai | Olympique de Médéa | Free transfer | |

=== Out ===
| Date | Pos | Player | To club | Transfer fee | Source |
|---|---|---|---|---|---|
| 25 July 2021 | MF | (Algeria) Nassim Yettou | Unattached | Free transfer | |
| 18 August 2021 | ST | (Algeria) Abdelhakim Amokrane | (Iraq) Al-Shorta SC | Free transfer | |
| 18 August 2021 | CB | (Algeria) Nasreddine Zaâlani | Unattached (Note: Zaâlani joined Olympique Khouribga on 9 September 2021.) | Free transfer | |
| 20 September 2021 | GK | (Algeria) Mohamed Lotfi Anis Osmani | Olympique de Médéa | Free transfer | |
| 20 September 2021 | FW | (Algeria) Lamine Abid | HB Chelghoum Laïd | Free transfer | |
| 2 October 2021 | FW | (Algeria) Adem Redjehimi | USM Annaba | Free transfer | |
| 15 October 2021 | FW | (Algeria) Youcef Djahnit | US Biskra | Free transfer | |
| 20 October 2021 | LB | (Algeria) Brahim Boudebouda | Olympique de Médéa | Free transfer | |
| 31 January 2022 | LW | (Algeria) Ilyes Yaiche | (Kuwait) Qadsia SC | Free transfer | |
