= 2022–23 HB Chelghoum Laïd season =

HB Chelghoum Laïd
2022–23 season
- Head coach: Toufik Rouabah (from 24 August 2022) (until 27 September 2022); El Hadi Khezzar (from 11 October 2022) (until 18 October 2022); Foudil Salem (from 18 October 2022)
- Stadium: 11 December 1961 Stadium
- Ligue 1: 16th (relegated)
- Algerian Cup: Round of 64
- Biggest defeat: HB Chelghoum Laïd 0–6 ES Sétif; HB Chelghoum Laïd 0–6 MC El Bayadh

The 2022–23 season, was HB Chelghoum Laïd's 2nd consecutive season in the top flight of Algerian football. In addition to the domestic league, HB Chelghoum Laïd participated in the Algerian Cup.

== Squad list ==
Players and squad numbers last updated in 5 February 2023.
Note: Flags indicate national team as has been defined under FIFA eligibility rules. Players may hold more than one non-FIFA nationality.

No.	Nat.	Position	Name	Date of birth (age)	Signed from
Goalkeepers
16	(Algeria)	GK	Abdelhak Mouaici	28 July 1991 (aged 31)	(Algeria) USM El Harrach
Defenders
2	(Algeria)	CB	Nasreddine Mekhazni	30 March 2000 (aged 22)	(Algeria) Youth system
4	(Algeria)	CB	Okba Bekhouche	23 July 1993 (aged 29)	(Algeria) JSM Skikda
11	(Algeria)	CB	Mohamed Nehari	23 July 1993 (aged 29)	(France) Marignane GCB
17	(Algeria)	RB	Soheyb Talbi	10 March 1994 (aged 28)	(Algeria) NC Magra
18	(Algeria)	LB	Farès Aggoun	7 May 1990 (aged 32)	(Algeria) NA Hussein Dey
21	(Algeria)	CB	Nasreddine Mekhazni	18 July 2000 (aged 22)	(Algeria) Youth system
24	(Algeria)	LB	Anis Khemaissia	27 January 1999 (aged 23)	(Algeria) USM Alger
Midfielders
5	(Algeria)	MF	Mustapha Oultache	29 November 1992 (aged 30)	(Algeria) AB Chelghoum Laid
23	(Algeria)	MF	Mouloud Meghezel	23 August 1992 (aged 30)	(France) Athlético Marseille
25	(Algeria)	MF	Adem Chaibi	11 October 2000 (aged 22)	(Algeria) Youth system
26	(Algeria)	MF	Youcef Belamri	27 September 1998 (aged 24)	(Algeria) AB Chelghoum Laid
Forwards
7	(Algeria)	FW	Riad Ait Abdelmalek	19 June 1997 (aged 25)	(Algeria) MO Béjaïa
8	(Algeria)	FW	Abderaouf Chouiter	8 June 1991 (aged 31)	(Algeria) NA Hussein Dey
9	(Algeria)	FW	Mohamed Reda Betrouni	19 August 1991 (aged 31)	(Algeria) NA Hussein Dey
20	(Algeria)	FW	Rachid Nadji	15 April 1988 (aged 34)	(Saudi Arabia) Al-Nahda

== Transfers ==
=== Out ===
==== Summer ====
Date	Pos	Player	To club	Transfer fee	Source
4 July 2022	FW	(Algeria) Ahmed Khaldi	CS Constantine	Free transfer	
18 July 2022	MF	(Algeria) Salaheddine Harrari	CS Constantine	Free transfer	
10 August 2022	RB	(Algeria) Kheireddine Benamrane	ES Sétif	Free transfer	
16 August 2022	FW	(Algeria) Hamza Demane	CS Constantine	Free transfer	
24 August 2022	FW	(Algeria) Abdelkader Kaibou	CS Constantine	Free transfer	

==== Winter ====
Date	Pos	Player	To club	Transfer fee	Source
24 January 2023	MF	(Algeria) Sid Ali Lamri	USM Khenchela	Free transfer	
25 January 2023	RB	(Algeria) Abdelhak Debbari	ASO Chlef	Free transfer	
27 January 2023	MF	(Algeria) Amir Karaoui	(Saudi Arabia) Al-Washm	Free transfer	
1 February 2023	GK	(Algeria) Abdelkader Morcely	MC El Bayadh	Free transfer	
1 February 2023	MF	(Algeria) Houssem Eddine Ouassini	ES Sétif	Free transfer	
5 February 2023	GK	(Algeria) Tarek Cheurfaoui	NC Magra	Free transfer	
5 February 2023	MF	(Algeria) Younes Koulkheir	Unattached	Released	
5 February 2023	MF	(Algeria) Abdelaziz Litt	Unattached	Released	
5 February 2023	MF	(Algeria) Omar Boudoumi	Unattached	Released	

== Competitions ==
=== Overview ===
Competition	Record								Started round	Final position / round	First match	Last match
Competition	G	W	D	L	GF	GA	GD	Win %	Started round	Final position / round	First match	Last match
Ligue 1	30	0	4	26	11	76	−65	0.00	—N/a	16th	26 August 2022	15 July 2023
Algerian Cup	1	0	0	1	0	6	−6	0.00	Round of 64	Round of 64	20 December 2022	20 December 2022
Total	31	0	4	27	11	82	−71	0.00				

Updated to match played 15 July 2023
Source: Competitions

=== Ligue 1 ===
==== League table ====
Pos	Team	Pld	W	D	L	GF	GA	GD	Pts	Qualification or relegation
12	US Biskra	30	10	10	10	30	29	+1	40	
13	NC Magra	30	11	7	12	35	36	−1	40	
14	JS Kabylie	30	10	9	11	35	26	+9	39	
15	RC Arbaâ (R)	30	10	6	14	39	43	−4	36	Relegation to Ligue 2
16	HB Chelghoum Laïd (R)	30	0	4	26	11	76	−65	4	Relegation to Ligue 2

Updated to match(es) played on 15 July 2023. Source: the-sports.org
Rules for classification: 1) points; 2) head-to-head points; 3) head-to-head goal difference; 4) goal difference; 5) total goals; 6) fairplay ranking; 7) playoff.
(R) Relegated

==== Results summary ====
Overall								Home						Away					
Pld	W	D	L	GF	GA	GD	Pts	W	D	L	GF	GA	GD	W	D	L	GF	GA	GD
30	0	4	26	11	76	−65	4	0	3	12	5	34	−29	0	1	14	6	42	−36

Last updated: 15 July 2023.
Source: Competitive matches

==== Results by round ====
Round	1	2	3	4	5	6	7	8	9	10	11	12	13	14	15	16	17	18	19	20	21	22	23	24	25	26	27	28	29	30
Ground	A	H	A	H	A	H	A	A	H	A	H	A	H	A	H	H	A	H	A	H	A	H	H	A	H	A	H	A	H	A
Result	L	D	L	L	L	L	L	L	L	L	L	L	L	L	L	L	L	D	L	L	L	L	D	L	L	D	L	L	L	L
Position	16	14	14	16	16	16	16	16	16	16	16	16	16	16	16	16	16	16	16	16	16	16	16	16	16	16	16	16	16	16

Updated to match(es) played on 15 July 2023. Source: Competitive matches
A = Away; H = Home; W = Win; D = Draw; L = Loss

==== Matches ====
The league fixtures were announced on 19 July 2022.

26 August 2022 Round 1	CR Belouizdad	4–1	HB Chelghoum Laïd	Belouizdad
17:00	Aribi 6' (pen.), 42'; Belkhir 71'; Bourdim 90'	Report	Zouad 83'	Stadium: 20 August 1955 Stadium; Attendance: 0 (close doors); Referee: Redouane Alou

3 September 2022 Round 2	HB Chelghoum Laïd	0–0	ASO Chlef	Chelghoum Laïd
16:30		Report		Stadium: 11 December 1961 Stadium; Referee: Mohamed Cherif Bouteraa

10 September 2022 Round 3	CS Constantine	2–0	HB Chelghoum Laïd	Constantine
16:30	Khaldi 39'; Dib 90+3'	Report		Stadium: Ramadane Ben Abdelmalek Stadium; Referee: Bilal Soltani

17 September 2022 Round 4	HB Chelghoum Laïd	1–3	USM Alger	Chelghoum Laïd
16:30	Litt 81'	Report	Mahious 54'; Bacha 89'; Radouani 90+4'	Stadium: 11 December 1961 Stadium; Referee: Lahlou Benbrahem

24 September 2022 Round 5	USM Khenchela	2–0	HB Chelghoum Laïd	Khenchela
16:30	Bayazid 31', 36'	Report		Stadium: Amar Hamam Stadium; Referee: Mohamed Amine Benzohra

2 October 2022 Round 6	HB Chelghoum Laïd	0–2	JS Kabylie	Chelghoum Laïd
16:00		Report	Guenina 60'; Boualia 90+1'	Stadium: 11 December 1961 Stadium; Referee: Houssam Benyahia

8 October 2022 Round 7	MC El Bayadh	1–0	HB Chelghoum Laïd	El Bayadh
15:00	Balegh 73' (pen.)	Report		Stadium: Zakaria Medjdoub Stadium; Referee: Mehdi Oukil

14 October 2022 Round 8	Paradou AC	2–1	HB Chelghoum Laïd	Dar El Beïda
15:00	Bouzida 16', 80'	Report	Karaoui 51'	Stadium: Omar Benrabah Stadium; Referee: Hadj Aissa Semmache

22 October 2022 Round 9	HB Chelghoum Laïd	1–2	MC Oran	Chelghoum Laïd
15:00	Belamri 81'	Report	Benayad 18'; Fourloul 46'	Stadium: 11 December 1961 Stadium; Referee: Redouane Allou

5 November 2022 Round 10	ES Sétif	4–0	HB Chelghoum Laïd	Sétif
17:00	Kendouci 23' (pen.), 59'; Guenaoui 66', 72'	Report		Stadium: 8 May 1945 Stadium; Referee: Abderrahmane Mohamed Belkbir

9 November 2022 Round 11	HB Chelghoum Laïd	0–1	MC Alger	Chelghoum Laïd
15:00		Report	Merzougui 90+3'	Stadium: 11 December 1961 Stadium; Referee: Ali Nader

29 November 2022 Round 12	JS Saoura	5–0	HB Chelghoum Laïd	Béchar
18:00	Hammia 15' (pen.), 20'; Benyazli 53'; Bellatreche 60'; Saâd 79'	Report		Stadium: 20 August 1955 Stadium; Referee: Oussama Makfoudji

7 December 2022 Round 13	HB Chelghoum Laïd	0–1	US Biskra	Chelghoum Laïd
15:00		Report	Abid 61'	Stadium: 11 December 1961 Stadium; Referee: Mohamed Amine Benzohra

11 December 2022 Round 14	RC Arbaâ	3–1	HB Chelghoum Laïd	Larbaâ
15:00	Taib 3', 25'; Amoura 44'	Report	Betrouni 36' (pen.)	Stadium: Ismaïl Makhlouf Stadium; Referee: Lamia Athmane

24 December 2022 Round 15	HB Chelghoum Laïd	0–5	NC Magra	Chelghoum Laïd
14:30		Report	Kaddour Chérif 41'; Ghanem 43', 90'; Salah 70'; El Orfi 79'	Stadium: 11 December 1961 Stadium; Referee: Ali Nader

17 February 2023 Round 17	ASO Chlef	4–0	HB Chelghoum Laïd	Relizane
15:00	Souibaâh 45+2' (pen.); Ghodbane 72', 83'; Aguieb 90+3' (pen.)	Report		Stadium: Tahar Zoughari Stadium; Referee: Elhadj Chihaoui

24 February 2023 Round 18	HB Chelghoum Laïd	1–1	CS Constantine	Chelghoum Laïd
15:00	Himri 80'	Report	Madani 72' (pen.)	Stadium: 11 December 1961 Stadium; Referee: Zakaria Antar

2 March 2023 Round 16	HB Chelghoum Laïd	0–1	CR Belouizdad	Chelghoum Laïd
15:00		Report	Hadded 6'	Stadium: 11 December 1961 Stadium; Referee: Zinelaabidine Dakhane

13 March 2023 Round 19	USM Alger	3–0	HB Chelghoum Laïd	Dar El Beïda
15:00	Bouchouareb 46'; Mahious 50', 67'	Report		Stadium: Omar Benrabah Stadium; Referee: Ahmed Benhamou

18 March 2023 Round 20	HB Chelghoum Laïd	1–2	USM Khenchela	Chelghoum Laïd
15:00	Bekhouche 90+1' (pen.)	Report	Bayazid 40' (pen.); Saâdou 65'	Stadium: 11 December 1961 Stadium; Referee: Walid Lahreche

5 April 2023 Round 21	JS Kabylie	1–0	HB Chelghoum Laïd	Tizi Ouzou
22:00	Boualia 71'	Report		Stadium: 1 November 1954 Stadium; Referee: Mehdi Oukil

9 April 2023 Round 22	HB Chelghoum Laïd	0–6	MC El Bayadh	Chelghoum Laïd
15:45		Report	Khalfallah 14'; Ghennam 45+1', 54'; Belmokhtar 51'; Bounaama 61', 73'	Stadium: 11 December 1961 Stadium; Referee: Elhadj Chihaoui

17 May 2023 Round 23	HB Chelghoum Laïd	1–1	Paradou AC	Chelghoum Laïd
16:00	Chaibi 36'	Report	Boulbina 75'	Stadium: 11 December 1961 Stadium; Referee: Mohamed Saidi

31 May 2023 Round 24	MC Oran	2–0	HB Chelghoum Laïd	Oran
18:00	Benayad 15'; Amrane 58' (o.g.)	Report		Stadium: Ahmed Zabana Stadium; Referee: Mohamed Makfoudji

6 June 2023 Round 25	HB Chelghoum Laïd	0–4	ES Sétif	Chelghoum Laïd
16:30		Report	Enow 12', 42', 51'; Askar 45'	Stadium: 11 December 1961 Stadium; Referee: Mohamed Tahar Milia

1 July 2023 Round 26	MC Alger	1–1	HB Chelghoum Laïd	Dar El Beïda
17:00	Haroune 45'	Report	Bouchelif 4'	Stadium: Omar Benrabah Stadium; Referee: Rafik Aouina

4 July 2023 Round 27	HB Chelghoum Laïd	0–2	JS Saoura	Chelghoum Laïd
17:00		Report	Saâd 4'; Doucene 63'	Stadium: 11 December 1961 Stadium; Referee: El Hadj Aissa Semmache

7 July 2023 Round 28	US Biskra	3–0	HB Chelghoum Laïd	Biskra
17:15	Khoualed 2'; Fenniri 6'; Baâli 51'	Report		Stadium: 18 February Stadium; Referee: Fodil Oukil

10 July 2023 Round 29	HB Chelghoum Laïd	0–3	RC Arbaâ	Chelghoum Laïd
17:15		Report	Benmenni 11'; Kessili 18'; Serradj 73'	Stadium: 11 December 1961 Stadium; Referee: Redouane Alou

15 July 2023 Round 30	NC Magra	5–2	HB Chelghoum Laïd	Magra
17:15	Amrane 4' (pen.); Kaddour Chérif 5', 8'; Saidi 38'; Atallah 88'	Report	Bouzidi 7'; Bekhouche 84'	Stadium: Boucheligue Brothers Stadium; Referee: Boubekeur Zouaoui

=== Algerian Cup ===
20 December 2022 Round of 64	HB Chelghoum Laïd	0–6	ES Sétif	Chelghoum Laïd
14:00		Report	Douib 2', 41'; Yattou 28'; Guenaoui 30'; Brahimi 50', 62'	Stadium: 11 December 1961 Stadium; Referee: Malek Aït Ameur
Note: Lineup for HB Chelghoum Laïd - Zella, Zouad, Bekhouche, Chemali, Mekhazni, Mehal S, Remli, Aib, Bouzeghaia, Mehal A, Bouchelif.

== Squad information ==
=== Playing statistics ===
No.	Pos	Nat	Player	Total		Ligue 1		Algerian Cup	
No.	Pos	Nat	Player	Apps	Goals	Apps	Goals	Apps	Goals
Goalkeepers
16	GK	(Algeria) ALG	Abdelhak Mouaici	6	0	6	0	0	0
40	GK	(Algeria) ALG	Fouad Zegrar	12	0	11	0	1	0
50	GK	(Algeria) ALG	Oussama Messaoudene	3	0	2	0	1	0
90	GK	(Algeria) ALG	Amine Zella	5	0	4	0	1	0
Defenders
2	DF	(Algeria) ALG	Nasreddine Mekhazni	14	0	13	0	1	0
4	DF	(Algeria) ALG	Okba Bekhouche	18	2	17	2	1	0
11	DF	(Algeria) ALG	Mohamed Nehari	5	0	5	0	0	0
15	DF	(Algeria) ALG	Hichem Lalaouna	6	0	6	0	0	0
17	DF	(Algeria) ALG	Soheyb Talbi	7	0	7	0	0	0
18	DF	(Algeria) ALG	Farès Aggoun	6	0	6	0	0	0
21	DF	(Algeria) ALG	Skander Chemali	18	0	17	0	1	0
24	DF	(Algeria) ALG	Anis Khemaissia	9	0	9	0	0	0
44	DF	(Algeria) ALG	Brahim Zouad	49	1	48	1	1	0
71	DF	(Algeria) ALG	Ouail Remli	16	0	15	0	1	0
82	DF	(Algeria) ALG	Taky Eddine Aib	11	0	10	0	1	0
Midfielders
5	MF	(Algeria) ALG	Mustapha Oultache	1	0	1	0	0	0
10	MF	(Algeria) ALG	Houssem Ouassni	6	0	6	0	0	0
13	MF	(Algeria) ALG	Sid Ali Lamri	10	1	10	1	0	0
23	MF	(Algeria) ALG	Mouloud Meghezel	2	0	2	0	0	0
25	MF	(Algeria) ALG	Adem Chaibi	24	1	24	1	0	0
26	MF	(Algeria) ALG	Youcef Belamri	19	0	19	0	0	0
27	MF	(Algeria) ALG	Omar Boudoumi	9	0	9	0	0	0
31	MF	(Algeria) ALG	Abdessamad Amrane	14	0	13	0	1	0
35	MF	(Algeria) ALG	Chouaïb Bouzeghaia	16	0	15	0	1	0
46	MF	(Algeria) ALG	Rami Kramou	5	0	5	0	0	0
63	MF	(Algeria) ALG	Mohammed Salah Mehal	11	0	10	0	1	0
66	MF	(Algeria) ALG	Abderraouf Himri	13	1	13	1	0	0
	MF	(Algeria) ALG	Aissam Ouergli	2	0	2	0	0	0
	MF	(Algeria) ALG	Abderahmane Fedouj	1	0	1	0	0	0
	MF	(Algeria) ALG	Abdessamed Belhi	1	0	1	0	0	0
Forwards
7	FW	(Algeria) ALG	Riad Ait Abdelmalek	4	0	4	0	0	0
8	FW	(Algeria) ALG	Abderaouf Chouiter	7	0	7	0	0	0
9	FW	(Algeria) ALG	Mohamed Reda Betrouni	12	1	12	1	0	0
20	FW	(Algeria) ALG	Rachid Nadji	5	0	5	0	0	0
22	FW	(Algeria) ALG	Abdelaziz Litt	10	1	10	1	0	0
33	FW	(Algeria) ALG	Sofiane Bouchelif	15	1	14	1	1	0
51	FW	(Algeria) ALG	Aymen Bouzidi	1	1	1	1	0	0
78	FW	(Algeria) ALG	Abdeldjalil Mehal	12	0	11	0	1	0
88	FW	(Algeria) ALG	Salah Eddine Himour	9	0	9	0	0	0
Players transferred out during the season
1	GK	(Algeria) ALG	Abdelkader Morcely	7	0	7	0	0	0
12	DF	(Algeria) ALG	Tarek Cheurfaoui	11	0	11	0	0	0
19	DF	(Algeria) ALG	Abdelhak Debbari	7	0	7	0	0	0
6	MF	(Algeria) ALG	Younes Koulkheir	7	0	7	0	0	0
13	MF	(Algeria) ALG	Sid Ali Lamri	10	1	10	1	0	0
14	MF	(Algeria) ALG	Amir Karaoui	10	1	10	1	0	0

Last updated: 15 July 2023
Source: soccerway.com

=== Goalscorers ===
As of 15 July 2023

Includes all competitive matches. The list is sorted alphabetically by surname when total goals are equal.

No.	Nat.	Player	Pos.	L 1	AC	TOTAL
4	(Algeria)	Okba Bekhouche	DF	2	0	2
44	(Algeria)	Brahim Zouad	DF	1	0	1
22	(Algeria)	Abdelaziz Litt	FW	1	0	1
14	(Algeria)	Amir Karaoui	MF	1	0	1
26	(Algeria)	Youcef Belamri	MF	1	0	1
9	(Algeria)	Mohamed Reda Betrouni	FW	1	0	1
66	(Algeria)	Abderraouf Himri	MF	1	0	1
25	(Algeria)	Adem Chaibi	MF	1	0	1
33	(Algeria)	Sofiane Bouchelif	FW	1	0	1
51	(Algeria)	Aymen Bouzidi	FW	1	0	1
Own Goals				0	0	0
Totals				11	0	11
