= 2023–24 CS Constantine season =

CS Constantine
2023–24 season
- Owner: ENTP
- President: Mohamed Boulahbib (until 9 October 2023); Tarek Arama (from 17 October 2023)
- Head coach: Lyamine Bougherara (until 3 October 2023); Abdelkader Amrani (from 21 October 2023)
- Stadium: Ramadane Ben Abdelmalek Stadium; Chahid Hamlaoui Stadium
- Ligue 1: 3rd
- Algerian Cup: Semi-finals
- Champions League: First round
- Top goalscorer: League: Brahim Dib (12 goals); All: Brahim Dib (13 goals)
- Biggest win: MC Oran 1–4 CS Constantine
- Biggest defeat: MC Alger 2–0 CS Constantine
Home colours	Away colours	Third colours

The 2023–24 season, is CS Constantine's 28th season and the club's 13th consecutive season in the top flight of Algerian football. In addition to the domestic league, CS Constantine are participating in this season's editions of the Algerian Cup and the CAF Champions League.

== Squad list ==
Players and squad numbers last updated on 5 February 2024.
Note: Flags indicate national team as has been defined under FIFA eligibility rules. Players may hold more than one non-FIFA nationality.

No.	Nat.	Position	Name	Date of Birth (Age)	Signed from
Goalkeepers
1	(Algeria)	GK	Kheireddine Boussouf	7 December 1987 (aged 35)	(Algeria) Paradou AC
16	(Algeria)	GK	Zakaria Bouhalfaya	11 August 1997 (aged 26)	(Algeria) ES Sétif
23	(Algeria)	GK	Abdelmalek Necir	6 September 1992 (aged 31)	(Algeria) NRB Teleghma
Defenders
4	(Algeria)	CB	Chahine Bellaouel	27 December 2000 (aged 22)	(Tunisia) CA Bizertin
5	(Algeria)	CB	Nasreddine Zaalani	26 July 1992 (aged 31)	(Saudi Arabia) Al-Kholood
8	(Algeria)	LB	Houari Baouche	24 December 1995 (aged 27)	(Algeria) USM Alger
12	(Algeria)	RB	Oussama Meddahi	14 February 1991 (aged 32)	(Algeria) NA Hussein Dey
17	(Algeria)	RB	Amir Belaili	10 February 1991 (aged 32)	(Algeria) AS Ain M'lila
19	(Algeria)	CB	Chamseddine Derradji	15 April 1992 (aged 31)	(Algeria) NC Magra
20	(Algeria)	CB	Mohamed Amine Madani	20 March 1992 (aged 31)	(Algeria) NC Magra
24	(Algeria)	RB	Aimen Bouguerra	10 January 1997 (aged 26)	(Algeria) CR Belouizdad
25	(Algeria)	CB	Miloud Rebiaï	12 December 1993 (aged 29)	(Algeria) CR Belouizdad
Midfielders
3	(Algeria)	MF	Salaheddine Harrari	9 June 1998 (aged 25)	(Algeria) HB Chelghoum Laïd
6	(Algeria)	MF	Mohamed Benchaira	10 January 1992 (aged 31)	(Algeria) JS Kabylie
7	(Algeria)	MF	Abdennour Belhocini	18 August 1996 (aged 27)	(Tunisia) Club Africain
10	(Algeria)	MF	Brahim Dib	6 July 1993 (aged 30)	(Algeria) AS Ain M'lila
15	(Algeria)	MF	Zakaria Messibah	16 October 1995 (aged 27)	(Algeria) Paradou AC
18	(Algeria)	MF	Messala Merbah	22 July 1994 (aged 29)	(Algeria) USM Alger
47	(Algeria)	MF	Hadji Chekal Affari	5 March 2003 (aged 20)	(Algeria) Youth system
Forwards
9	(Algeria)	FW	Zakaria Benchaâ	12 June 1997 (aged 26)	Unattached
11	(Algeria)	FW	Mounder Temine	15 September 2001 (aged 22)	(Algeria) Youth system
13	(Cameroon)	FW	Nkembe Enow	11 November 1999 (aged 23)	(Algeria) ES Sétif
14	(Gabon)	FW	Axel Méyé	6 June 1995 (aged 28)	(Libya) Al-Ahly SC
21	(Algeria)	FW	Amine Benmessabih	2 January 1996 (aged 27)	(Algeria) JSM Tiaret
26	(Algeria)	FW	Abdelkader Kaibou	12 September 1997 (aged 26)	(Morocco) MC Oujda
27	(Algeria)	FW	Ahmed Khaldi	22 July 1998 (aged 25)	(Algeria) HB Chelghoum Laïd

== Transfers ==
=== In ===
==== Summer ====
Date	Pos	Player	Moving from	Fee	Source
20 July 2023	GK	(Algeria) Kheireddine Boussouf	Paradou AC	Free transfer	
20 July 2023	GK	(Algeria) Zakaria Bouhalfaya	ES Sétif	Free transfer	
20 July 2023	MF	(Algeria) Messala Merbah	USM Alger	Free transfer	
20 July 2023	FW	(Algeria) Mohamed Amine Benmessabih	JSM Tiaret	Free transfer	
23 July 2023	DF	(Algeria) Chahine Bellaouel	(Tunisia) CA Bizertin	Free transfer	
24 July 2023	FW	(Algeria) Abdelkader Kaibou	(Morocco) MC Oujda	Free transfer	
28 July 2023	MF	(Algeria) Houari Baouche	USM Alger	Free transfer	
28 July 2023	MF	(Algeria) Zakaria Benchaâ	Unattached	Free transfer	
4 August 2023	FW	(Algeria) Ghiles Guenaoui	ES Sétif	Free transfer	
9 August 2023	MF	(Algeria) Abdennour Belhocini	(Tunisia) Club Africain	Free transfer	
10 August 2023	MF	(Cameroon) Andre Ulrich Zanga	(Cameroon) AR Menoua	Free transfer	
22 August 2023	FW	(Cameroon) Enow Nkembe	ES Sétif	Free transfer	
10 September 2023	DF	(Algeria) Miloud Rebiaï	CR Belouizdad	Free transfer	
10 September 2023	GK	(Algeria) Abdelmalek Necir	NRB Teleghma	Free transfer	

==== Winter ====
Date	Pos	Player	Moving from	Fee	Source
31 January 2024	DF	(Algeria) Aimen Bouguerra	CR Belouizdad	Loan	
4 February 2024	FW	(Gabon) Axel Méyé	(Libya) Al-Ahly SC	Free transfer	

=== Out ===
==== Summer ====
Date	Pos	Player	Moving to	Fee	Source
25 June 2023	FW	(Algeria) Aymane Issad Lakdja	Al-Nasr SC	Free transfer	
17 July 2023	LB	(Algeria) Ahmed Maâmeri	JS Kabylie	Free transfer	
17 July 2023	GK	(Algeria) Chamseddine Rahmani	JS Kabylie	Free transfer	
25 July 2023	FW	(Algeria) Marcellin Koukpo	Free agent	Free transfer	
29 July 2023	MF	(Algeria) Aymen Bendaoud	JS Kabylie	Free transfer	
30 July 2023	MF	(Algeria) Samir Aiboud	Free agent	Free transfer	
30 July 2023	FW	(Algeria) Abdelhak Abdelhafid	JS Saoura	Free transfer	
13 August 2023	GK	(Algeria) Sofiane Abed	CA Batna	Free transfer	
17 August 2023	DF	(Algeria) Hamza Rebiai	USM Khenchela	Free transfer	
8 September 2023	FW	(Algeria) Ghiles Guenaoui	(Egypt) Al Masry SC	Free transfer	
10 September 2023	GK	(Algeria) Faris Boukerrit	MC Oran	Free transfer	

==== Winter ====
Date	Pos	Player	Moving to	Fee	Source
6 December 2023	MF	(Cameroon) Andre Ulrich Zanga	Free agent	Free transfer (Released)	
11 December 2023	DF	(Algeria) Seif Eddine Chettih	Free agent	Free transfer (Released)	
30 January 2024	MF	(Algeria) Zakaria Kemoukh	Free agent	Free transfer	
4 February 2024	FW	(Algeria) Oualid Ardji	MC Oran	Free transfer	

== Competitions ==
=== Overview ===
Competition	Record								Started round	Final position / round	First match	Last match
Competition	G	W	D	L	GF	GA	GD	Win %	Started round	Final position / round	First match	Last match
Ligue 1	30	15	8	7	46	30	+16	50.00	—N/a	3rd	15 September 2023	14 June 2024
Algerian Cup	5	2	2	1	6	3	+3	40.00	Round of 64	Semi-finals	4 February 2024	23 April 2024
Champions League	2	0	0	2	0	3	−3	0.00	First round	First round	18 August 2023	26 August 2023
Total	37	17	10	10	52	36	+16	45.95				

Updated to match played 14 June 2024
Source: Competitions

=== Ligue 1 ===
==== League table ====
Pos	Team	Pld	W	D	L	GF	GA	GD	Pts	Qualification or relegation
1	MC Alger (C)	30	19	8	3	55	20	+35	65	Qualification for CAF Champions League
2	CR Belouizdad	30	15	8	7	37	20	+17	53	Qualification for CAF Champions League
3	CS Constantine	30	15	8	7	46	30	+16	53	Qualification for CAF Confederation Cup
4	USM Alger	30	15	4	11	40	32	+8	49	Qualification for CAF Confederation Cup
5	ES Sétif	30	14	6	10	37	37	0	48	

Source: the-sports.org
Rules for classification: 1) points; 2) head-to-head points; 3) head-to-head goal difference; 4) goal difference; 5) total goals; 6) fairplay ranking; 7) playoff.
(C) Champions

==== Results summary ====
Overall								Home						Away					
Pld	W	D	L	GF	GA	GD	Pts	W	D	L	GF	GA	GD	W	D	L	GF	GA	GD
30	15	8	7	46	30	+16	53	8	5	2	25	11	+14	7	3	5	21	19	+2

Last updated: 14 June 2024.
Source: Competitive matches

==== Results by round ====
Round	1	2	3	4	5	6	7	8	9	10	11	12	13	14	15	16	17	18	19	20	21	22	23	24	25	26	27	28	29	30
Ground	A	H	A	H	A	H	A	H	A	H	A	H	A	H	A	H	A	H	A	H	A	H	A	H	A	H	A	H	A	H
Result	L	W	L	W	W	L	D	W	W	W	L	D	W	D	L	W	L	W	D	W	W	W	W	D	D	D	W	D	W	L
Position	9	9	11	8	3	7	7	5	3	3	3	3	3	3	5	4	4	4	4	2	2	2	2	2	3	3	3	3	2	3

Updated to match(es) played on 14 June 2024. Source: Competitive matches
A = Away; H = Home; W = Win; D = Draw; L = Loss

==== Matches ====
The league fixtures were announced on 24 August 2023.

All times are local, WAT (UTC+1).

Win Draw Loss Postponed

15 September 2023 Round 1	MC El Bayadh	1–0	CS Constantine	El Bayadh
16:00	Ghenam 41'	Report		Stadium: Zakaria Medjdoub Stadium; Referee: Lotfi Bekouassa

22 September 2023 Round 2	CS Constantine	2–1	MC Alger	Constantine
16:00	Zaalani 30'; Dib 82' (pen.)	Report	Belaïli 17'	Stadium: Ramadane Ben Abdelmalek Stadium; Referee: Houssam Benyahia

30 September 2023 Round 3	ASO Chlef	1–0	CS Constantine	Chlef
19:00	Agbagno 21'	Report		Stadium: Mohamed Boumezrag Stadium; Referee: Mehadji Tayeb Bouderbali

6 October 2023 Round 4	CS Constantine	3–0	JS Saoura	Constantine
15:45	Belhocini 23'; Benchaâ 43'; Dib 60'	Report		Stadium: Ramadane Ben Abdelmalek Stadium; Referee: Lahlou Benbrahem

10 November 2023 Round 5	US Souf	3–4	CS Constantine	El Oued
15:30	Bassou 45+4'; Rahmani 51'; Lalaouna 61'	Report	Benchaâ 15'; Dib 56' (pen.), 74'; Temine 89'	Stadium: 1 November 1954 Stadium; Referee: Youcef Tayeb Bouderbal

17 November 2023 Round 6	CS Constantine	0–1	NC Magra	Constantine
15:30		Report	Bourahla 70'	Stadium: Ramadane Ben Abdelmalek Stadium; Referee: Mohamed Belkebir

24 November 2023 Round 7	Paradou AC	0–0	CS Constantine	Dar El Beïda
15:15		Report		Stadium: Omar Benrabah Stadium; Referee: Nabil Boukhalfa

1 December 2023 Round 8	CS Constantine	2–0	USM Khenchela	Constantine
18:00	Benchaâ 16'; Dib 62' (pen.)	Report		Stadium: Chahid Hamlaoui Stadium; Referee: Lyes Bekouassa

15 December 2023 Round 10	CS Constantine	2–0	JS Kabylie	Constantine
16:45	Dib 45+4' (pen.); Belhocini 90+5'	Report		Stadium: Chahid Hamlaoui Stadium; Referee: Anes Azrine

28 December 2023 Round 11	CR Belouizdad	2–1	CS Constantine	Algiers
19:00	Wamba 16', 66'	Report	Khaldi 72'	Stadium: Stade du 5 Juillet; Referee: Lahlou Benbraham

5 January 2024 Round 12	CS Constantine	1–1	US Biskra	Constantine
18:30	Dib 39' (pen.)	Report	Siam 34'	Stadium: Chahid Hamlaoui Stadium; Referee: Hamza Bouslimani

11 January 2024 Round 13	MC Oran	1–4	CS Constantine	Oran
16:45	Ibouzidène 77'	Report	Dib 39' (pen.); Temine 66', 86', 88'	Stadium: Ahmed Zabana Stadium; Referee: Rafik Aouina

19 January 2024 Round 14	CS Constantine	1–1	ES Ben Aknoun	Constantine
16:45	Madani 90+5'	Report	Ait Mouloud 77'	Stadium: Chahid Hamlaoui Stadium; Referee: Nabil Boukhalfa

26 January 2024 Round 15	ES Sétif	2–1	CS Constantine	Sétif
16:45	Lahmeri 11' (pen.); Chikhi 29'	Report	Rebiaï 5'	Stadium: 8 May 1945 Stadium; Referee: Billel Soltani

31 January 2024 Round 9	USM Alger	1–2	CS Constantine	Algiers
19:00	Djahnit 87'	Report	Belhocini 60'; Dib 80' (pen.)	Stadium: Stade du 5 Juillet; Referee: Youcef Taieb Bouderbal

10 February 2024 Round 16	CS Constantine	2–1	MC El Bayadh	Constantine
16:00	Dib 48' (pen.); Benmessabih 90'	Report	Bounaama 24'	Stadium: Chahid Hamlaoui Stadium; Referee: Abderahmane Sahraoui

16 February 2024 Round 17	MC Alger	2–0	CS Constantine	Algiers
18:00	Naidji 42'; Merzougui 88'	Report		Stadium: Stade du 5 Juillet; Referee: Billel Bendjahene

24 February 2024 Round 18	CS Constantine	3–1	ASO Chlef	Constantine
16:45	Khaldi 11', 67'; Benchaira 81'	Report	Aguieb 22'	Stadium: Chahid Hamlaoui Stadium; Referee: Anes Azrine

2 March 2024 Round 19	JS Saoura	2–2	CS Constantine	Béchar
17:00	Souibaâh 32' (pen.); Saâdi 90+7'	Report	Dib 10'; Belhocini 67'	Stadium: 20 August 1955 Stadium; Referee: Hamza Bouslimani

15 March 2024 Round 20	CS Constantine	3–0	US Souf	Constantine
22:00	Khaldi 22'; Belhocini 38'; Chekal 85'	Report		Stadium: Chahid Hamlaoui Stadium; Referee: Tahar Boudjemaa

24 March 2024 Round 21	NC Magra	2–3	CS Constantine	Magra
15:30	Bourahla 34', 63'	Report	Temine 16'; Khaldi 26', 41'	Stadium: Boucheligue Brothers Stadium; Referee: Billel Soltani

6 April 2024 Round 22	CS Constantine	2–1	Paradou AC	Constantine
22:00	Benchaira 3'; Madani 43'	Report	Hamidi 18' (pen.)	Stadium: Chahid Hamlaoui Stadium; Referee: Youcef Tayeb Bouderbal

19 April 2024 Round 23	USM Khenchela	1–2	CS Constantine	Khenchela
16:00	Omoyele 11'	Report	Temine 4'; Rebai 57' (o.g.)	Stadium: Amar Hamam Stadium; Referee: Lyes Bekouassa

11 May 2024 Round 25	JS Kabylie	0–0	CS Constantine	Tizi Ouzou
17:00		Report		Stadium: 1 November 1954 Stadium; Referee: Rafik Aouina

17 May 2024 Round 26	CS Constantine	1–1	CR Belouizdad	Constantine
17:00	Dib 16' (pen.)	Report	Laouafi 54' (pen.)	Stadium: Chahid Hamlaoui Stadium; Referee: Youcef Taieb Bouderbal

26 May 2024 Round 27	US Biskra	0–1	CS Constantine	Biskra
16:45	Benchaâ 44'	Report		Stadium: 18 February Stadium; Referee: Anes Azrine

3 June 2024 Round 24	CS Constantine	1–1	USM Alger	Constantine
18:00	Rebiaï 56'	Report	Konaté 90+2'	Stadium: Chahid Hamlaoui Stadium; Referee: Tahar Boudjemaa

7 June 2024 Round 28	CS Constantine	1–1	MC Oran	Khenchela
16:45	Bouguerra 20'	Report	Kerroum 20'	Stadium: Amar Hamam Stadium; Attendance: 0 (close doors); Referee: Billel Soltani

11 June 2024 Round 29	ES Ben Aknoun	0–1	CS Constantine	Belouizdad
16:45		Report	Benchaâ 90+8'	Stadium: 20 August 1955 Stadium; Attendance: 0 (close doors); Referee: Yahia Dahar

14 June 2024 Round 30	CS Constantine	1–2	ES Sétif	Khenchela
16:45	Benmessabih 77'	Report	Moulay 59', 75'	Stadium: Amar Hamam Stadium; Attendance: 0 (close doors); Referee: Mohamed Lamine Chaoubi

=== Algerian Cup ===
4 February 2024 Round of 64	NC Magra	0–2	CS Constantine	Magra
13:45		Report	Belhocini 38'; Chekal 90+3'	Stadium: Boucheligue Brothers Stadium; Referee: Lyes Bekouassa
Note: CS Constantine Lineups: Bouhalfaya, Derradji, Zaalani, Meddahi (substituted off) 86' (Bellaouel (substituted on) 86'), Baouche, Benchaira (substituted off) 90+2' (Chekal (substituted on) 90+2'), Merbah, Belhocini, Dib, Kaibou (substituted off) 76' (Bouguerra (substituted on) 76'), Temine,

9 March 2024 Round of 32	ES Sétif	1–1 (a.e.t.) (8–9 p)	CS Constantine	Sétif
16:45	Oukil 32'	Report	Méyé 75'	Stadium: 8 May 1945 Stadium; Referee: Mustapha Ghorbal
	Penalties
	Ziti (penalty scored); Chikhi (penalty scored); Jiddou (penalty scored); Aggoun (penalty scored); Zamoum (penalty scored); Chaabi (penalty scored); Hitala (penalty scored); Brahimi (penalty missed); Guettaf (penalty scored); Saidi (penalty missed)		(penalty scored) Dib; (penalty scored) Merbah; (penalty scored) Messibah; (penalty scored) Chekal; (penalty scored) Madani; (penalty scored) Zaalani; (penalty scored) Belaili; (penalty missed) Baouche; (penalty scored) Temine; (penalty scored) Bouhalfaya
Note: CS Constantine Lineups: Bouhalfaya, Madani, Zaalani, Meddahi, Rebiaï (substituted off) 69' (Temine (substituted on) 69'), Benchaira (substituted off) 61' (Chekal (substituted on) 61'), Merbah, Belhocini (substituted off) 90' (Benmessabih (substituted on) 90'), Dib, Khaldi (substituted off) 61' (Baouche (substituted on) 61'), Méyé.

29 March 2024 Round of 16	USM Annaba	0–2	CS Constantine	Annaba
22:00		Report	Dib 45+3' (pen.); Khaldi 80'	Stadium: 19 May 1956 Stadium; Referee: Lotfi Bekouassa
Note: CS Constantine Lineups: Bouhalfaya, Baouche (substituted off) 85' (Belaili (substituted on) 85'), Bouguerra, Zaalani (substituted off) 85' (Derradji (substituted on) 85'), Rebiaï, Benchaira (substituted off) 85' (Kaibou (substituted on) 85'), Messibah, Dib, Belhocini (substituted off) 70' (Chekal (substituted on) 70'), Khaldi (substituted off) 90+1' (Benmessabih (substituted on) 90+1'), Temine,

13 April 2024 Quarter-finals	CS Constantine	0–0 (a.e.t.) (5–4 p)	ES Ben Aknoun	Oran
17:30		Report		Stadium: Miloud Hadefi Stadium; Referee: Mustapha Ghorbal
	Penalties
	Dib (penalty scored); Rebiaï (penalty scored); Zaalani (penalty missed); Madani (penalty scored); Benchaâ (penalty missed); Temine (penalty scored); Meddahi (penalty scored)		(penalty missed) Hachoud; (penalty scored) Bencherifa; (penalty missed) Hadji; (penalty scored) Benabdi; (penalty scored) Daoud; (penalty scored) Boutiche; (penalty missed) Ait Mouloud
Note: CS Constantine Lineups: Bouhalfaya, Madani, Zaalani, Baouche, Bouguerra (substituted off) 105+2' (Benmessabih (substituted on) 105+2'), Benchaira (substituted off) 114' (Rebiaï (substituted on) 114'), Merbah, Chekal (substituted off) 91' (Benchaâ (substituted on) 91'), Dib, Belhocini (substituted off) 105+2' (Meddahi (substituted on) 105+2'), Méyé (substituted off) 70' (Temine (substituted on) 70').

23 April 2024 Semi-finals	MC Alger	2–1 (a.e.t.)	CS Constantine	Oran
21:00	Zougrana 78'; Abdellaoui 115'	Report	Madani 19'	Stadium: Miloud Hadefi Stadium; Attendance: 0 (close doors); Referee: Lahlou Benbraham
Note: CS Constantine Lineups: Bouhalfaya, Madani (substituted off) 97' (Benmessabih (substituted on) 97'), Rebiaï, Baouche, Bouguerra, Benchaira (substituted off) 82' (Zaalani (substituted on) 82'), Merbah, Chekal (substituted off) 118' (Benchaâ (substituted on) 118'), Dib, Belhocini (substituted off) 82' (Messibah (substituted on) 82'), Temine (substituted off) 90+3' (Méyé (substituted on) 90+3').

=== Champions League ===
==== Qualifying rounds ====
In the qualifying rounds, each tie will be played on a home-and-away two-legged basis. If the aggregate score will be tied after the second leg, the away goals rule was applied, and if still tied, extra time will not be played, and the penalty shoot-out will be used to determine the winner (Regulations III. 13 & 14).

===== First round =====
18 August 2023 First leg	CS Constantine (Algeria)	0–2	(Tunisia) ES Sahel	Constantine
20:00 UTC+1		Report	Sidibé 70'; Jelassi 90+8' (pen.)	Stadium: Chahid Hamlaoui Stadium; Referee: Ibrahim Nour El Din (Egypt)

26 August 2023 Second leg	ES Sahel (Tunisia)	1–0 (3–0 agg.)	(Algeria) CS Constantine	Sousse
16:00 UTC+1	Abdelli 12'	Report		Stadium: Sousse Olympic Stadium; Referee: Mohamed Agha (Libya)

== Squad information ==
=== Playing statistics ===
No.	Pos	Nat	Player	Total		Ligue 1		Algerian Cup		Champions League	
No.	Pos	Nat	Player	Apps	Goals	Apps	Goals	Apps	Goals	Apps	Goals
Goalkeepers
1	GK	(Algeria) ALG	Kheireddine Boussouf	11	0	9	0	0	0	2	0
16	GK	(Algeria) ALG	Zakaria Bouhalfaya	26	0	21	0	5	0	0	0
23	GK	(Algeria) ALG	Abdelmalek Necir	2	0	2	0	0	0	0	0
Defenders
4	DF	(Algeria) ALG	Chahine Bellaouel	3	0	2	0	1	0	0	0
5	DF	(Algeria) ALG	Nasreddine Zaalani	32	1	25	1	5	0	2	0
8	DF	(Algeria) ALG	Houari Baouche	36	0	29	0	5	0	2	0
12	DF	(Algeria) ALG	Oussama Meddahi	23	0	20	0	2	0	1	0
17	DF	(Algeria) ALG	Amir Belaili	10	0	7	0	2	0	1	0
19	DF	(Algeria) ALG	Chamseddine Derradji	17	0	14	0	2	0	1	0
20	DF	(Algeria) ALG	Mohamed Amine Madani	28	2	23	1	3	1	2	0
24	DF	(Algeria) ALG	Aimen Bouguerra	14	1	10	1	4	0	0	0
25	DF	(Algeria) ALG	Miloud Rebiaï	21	3	17	3	4	0	0	0
Midfielders
3	MF	(Algeria) ALG	Salaheddine Harrari	1	0	0	0	0	0	1	0
6	MF	(Algeria) ALG	Mohamed Benchaira	36	2	29	2	5	0	2	0
7	MF	(Algeria) ALG	Abdennour Belhocini	29	6	24	5	5	1	0	0
10	MF	(Algeria) ALG	Brahim Dib	36	13	29	12	5	1	2	0
15	MF	(Algeria) ALG	Zakaria Messibah	26	0	22	0	2	0	2	0
18	MF	(Algeria) ALG	Messala Merbah	29	0	24	0	4	0	1	0
47	MF	(Algeria) ALG	Hadji Chekal Affari	28	2	22	1	5	1	1	0
Forwards
9	FW	(Algeria) ALG	Zakaria Benchaâ	25	5	23	5	2	0	0	0
11	FW	(Algeria) ALG	Mounder Temine	32	6	25	6	5	0	2	0
13	FW	(Cameroon) CMR	Nkembe Enow	4	0	4	0	0	0	0	0
14	FW	(Gabon) GAB	Axel Méyé	12	1	9	0	3	1	0	0
21	FW	(Algeria) ALG	Amine Benmessabih	21	2	15	2	4	0	2	0
26	FW	(Algeria) ALG	Abdelkader Kaibou	10	0	9	0	1	0	0	0
27	FW	(Algeria) ALG	Ahmed Khaldi	28	7	23	6	3	1	2	0
77	FW	(Algeria) ALG	Wajih Khalfaoui	1	0	1	0	0	0	0	0
Players transferred out during the season
2	DF	(Algeria) ALG	Seif Eddine Chettih	0	0	0	0	0	0	0	0
14	MF	(Cameroon) CMR	Andre Ulrich Zanga	0	0	0	0	0	0	0	0
24	MF	(Algeria) ALG	Zakaria Kemoukh	3	0	2	0	0	0	1	0
22	FW	(Algeria) ALG	Oualid Ardji	15	0	13	0	0	0	2	0

Last updated: 14 June 2024
Source: soccerway.com

=== Goalscorers ===
As of 14 June 2024

Includes all competitive matches.

No.	Nat.	Player	Pos.	L 1	AC	CL	TOTAL
10	(Algeria)	Brahim Dib	MF	12	1	0	13
27	(Algeria)	Ahmed Khaldi	FW	6	1	0	7
7	(Algeria)	Abdennour Belhocini	FW	5	1	0	6
11	(Algeria)	Mounder Temine	FW	6	0	0	6
9	(Algeria)	Zakaria Benchaâ	FW	5	0	0	5
20	(Algeria)	Mohamed Amine Madani	DF	2	1	0	3
47	(Algeria)	Hadji Chekal Affari	MF	1	1	0	2
6	(Algeria)	Mohamed Benchaira	MF	2	0	0	2
25	(Algeria)	Miloud Rebiaï	DF	2	0	0	2
21	(Algeria)	Amine Benmessabih	FW	2	0	0	2
5	(Algeria)	Nasreddine Zaalani	DF	1	0	0	1
14	(Gabon)	Axel Méyé	FW	0	1	0	1
24	(Algeria)	Aimen Bouguerra	DF	1	0	0	1
Own Goals				1	0	0	1
Totals				46	6	0	52
