= 2021–22 HB Chelghoum Laïd season =

HB Chelghoum Laïd
2021–22 season
- Head coach: Meziane Ighil (from 20 September 2021) (until 20 November 2021); Aziz Abbès (from 25 December 2021) (until 23 February 2022); Imad Mehal (c) (from 23 February 2022) (until 20 April 2022); Chérif Hadjar (from 20 April 2022)
- Stadium: 11 December 1961 Stadium
- Ligue 1: 12th
- Top goalscorer: League: Hamza Demane; Ahmed Khaldi; Salaheddine Harrari (7 goals); All: Hamza Demane; Ahmed Khaldi; Salaheddine Harrari (7 goals)
- Biggest win: 4–1 vs WA Tlemcen (A) (14 May 2022)
- Biggest defeat: 0–5 vs JS Saoura (A) (8 April 2022)

The 2021–22 season, was HB Chelghoum Laïd's first ever season in the top flight of Algerian football.

== Squad list ==
Players and squad numbers last updated on 20 October 2021.
Note: Flags indicate national team as has been defined under FIFA eligibility rules. Players may hold more than one non-FIFA nationality.

No.	Nat.	Position	Name	Date of birth (age)	Signed from
Goalkeepers
1	(Algeria)	GK	Fetheddine Alaoui	6 August 1990 (aged 31)	(Algeria) Olympique de Médéa
16	(Algeria)	GK	Abdelhak Mouaici	28 July 1991 (aged 30)	(Algeria) USM El Harrach
Defenders
3	(Algeria)	DF	Chakib Benhmadou	26 October 1999 (aged 22)	(Algeria) USM El Harrach
12	(Algeria)	CB	Tarek Cheurfaoui	28 June 1986 (aged 35)	(Algeria) Olympique de Médéa
15	(Algeria)	DF	Hichem Lalaouna	18 May 1995 (aged 26)	(Algeria) MO Constantine
20	(Algeria)	RB	Zakaria Zaitri	18 July 1998 (aged 23)	(Algeria) USM Blida
22	(Algeria)	CB	Mohamed Achref Aib	24 May 1990 (aged 31)	(Algeria) NC Magra
23	(Algeria)	LB	Abdelhak Belkacemi	27 July 1992 (aged 29)	(Algeria) Olympique de Médéa
24	(Algeria)	CB	Salah Dadache	20 November 1990 (aged 31)	(Algeria) AB Chelghoum Laid
25	(Algeria)	RB	Kheireddine Benamrane	8 July 1994 (aged 27)	(Algeria) WA Tlemcen
Midfielders
4	(Algeria)	MF	Mohamed Belaribi	17 October 1997 (aged 24)	(Algeria) ASM Oran
5	(Algeria)	MF	Mustapha Oultache	29 November 1992 (aged 29)	(Algeria) AB Chelghoum Laid
8	(Algeria)	MF	Youcef Islam Siab	11 June 1994 (aged 27)	(Algeria) USM Khenchela
10	(Algeria)	MF	Zakaria Kemoukh	6 March 1992 (aged 29)	(Algeria) Olympique de Médéa
13	(Algeria)	MF	Sid Ali Lamri	3 February 1991 (aged 30)	(Algeria) CS Constantine
14	(Algeria)	MF	Foued Hadded	1 November 1990 (aged 31)	(Algeria) CS Constantine
18	(Algeria)	MF	Abdelmalek Elmenaouer	16 January 1997 (aged 24)	(Algeria) RC Relizane
19	(Algeria)	MF	Salaheddine Harrari	9 June 1998 (aged 22)	(Algeria) Paradou AC
21	(Algeria)	MF	Ahmed Khaldi	22 July 1998 (aged 22)	(Algeria) CA Batna
26	(Algeria)	MF	Youcef Belamri	27 September 1998 (aged 23)	(Algeria) AB Chelghoum Laid
Forwards
6	(Algeria)	FW	Abdelali Hadji	25 June 1997 (aged 24)	(Algeria) DRB Tadjenanet
7	(Algeria)	FW	Abdelkader Kaibou	12 September 1997 (aged 24)	(Algeria) JSM Skikda
9	(Algeria)	FW	Lamine Abid	4 July 1991 (aged 29)	(Algeria) CS Constantine
11	(Algeria)	FW	Abdelkader Ghorab	28 February 1998 (aged 23)	(Algeria) Paradou AC
17	(Algeria)	FW	Naoufel Righi	1 October 1992 (aged 29)	(Algeria) NC Magra
27	(Algeria)	FW	Mohamed Saïd Bouchoucha	18 January 1998 (aged 23)	(Algeria) MCB Oued Sly

== Transfers ==
=== In ===
==== Summer ====
Date	Pos	Player	From club	Transfer fee	Source
12 September 2021	DM	(Algeria) Sid Ali Lamri	CS Constantine	Free transfer	
12 September 2021	AM	(Algeria) Abdelkader Ghorab	Paradou AC	Loan for one year	
12 September 2021	CB	(Algeria) Mohamed Achref Aib	NC Magra	Free transfer	
12 September 2021	MF	(Algeria) Foued Hadded	CS Constantine	Free transfer	
12 September 2021	AM	(Algeria) Islam Siab	USM Khenchela	Free transfer	
12 September 2021	FW	(Algeria) Mohamed Saïd Bouchoucha	MCB Oued Sly	Free transfer	
12 September 2021	GK	(Algeria) Saber Meddour	DRB Tadjenanet	Free transfer	
13 September 2021	FW	(Algeria) Naoufel Righi	NC Magra	Free transfer	
13 September 2021	MF	(Algeria) Zakaria Khaldi	CA Batna	Free transfer	
13 September 2021	FW	(Algeria) Abdelkader Kaibou	JSM Skikda	Free transfer	
15 September 2021	LB	(Algeria) Abdelhak Belkacemi	Olympique de Médéa	Free transfer	
15 September 2021	GK	(Algeria) Fetheddine Alaoui	Olympique de Médéa	Free transfer	
17 September 2021	MF	(Algeria) Salaheddine Harrari	Paradou AC	Loan for one year	
19 September 2021	RB	(Algeria) Zakaria Zaitri	USM Blida	Free transfer	
20 September 2021	FW	(Algeria) Lamine Abid	CS Constantine	Free transfer	
26 September 2021	RB	(Algeria) Kheireddine Benamrane	WA Tlemcen	Free transfer	
30 September 2021	FW	(Algeria) Abdelali Hadji	DRB Tadjenanet	Free transfer	
7 October 2021	MF	(Algeria) Zakaria Kemoukh	Olympique de Médéa	Free transfer	
7 October 2021	MF	(Algeria) Abdelmalek Elmenaouer	RC Relizane	Free transfer	
13 October 2021	CB	(Algeria) Tarek Cheurfaoui	Olympique de Médéa	Free transfer	
20 October 2021	MF	(Algeria) Mohamed Belaribi	ASM Oran	Free transfer	

=== Out ===
==== Summer ====
Date	Pos	Player	To club	Transfer fee	Source
15 August 2021	CB	(Algeria) Moussa Benzaid	JS Kabylie	Free transfer	
15 August 2021	MF	(Algeria) Mohamed Khelfaoui	JS Kabylie	Free transfer	
21 September 2021	FW	(Algeria) Belkacem Yadaden	MC Oran	Free transfer	

=== New contracts ===
No.	Pos	Player	Contract length	Contract end	Date	Source
4	DF	(Algeria) Salah Dadache	2 years	2023	12 September 2021	
1	GK	(Algeria) Abdelhak Mouaici	2 years	2023	13 September 2021	
14	DF	(Algeria) Hichem laalaouna	2 years	2023	13 September 2021	
13	MF	(Algeria) Youcef Belamri	2 years	2023	19 September 2021	

== Competitions ==
=== Overview ===
Competition	Record								Started round	Final position / round	First match	Last match
Competition	G	W	D	L	GF	GA	GD	Win %	Started round	Final position / round	First match	Last match
Ligue 1	34	11	12	11	40	41	−1	32.35	—N/a	12th	29 October 2021	10 June 2022
Total	34	11	12	11	40	41	−1	32.35				

Updated to match played 10 June 2022
Source: Competitions

=== Ligue 1 ===
==== League table ====
Pos	Team	Pld	W	D	L	GF	GA	GD	Pts
10	US Biskra	34	13	11	10	36	32	+4	50 (Note: ASO Chlef finished ahead of US Biskra on head-to-head goal difference: US Biskra 2–1 ASO Chlef, ASO Chlef 2–0 US Biskra.)
11	MC Oran	34	10	16	8	32	29	+3	46
12	HB Chelghoum Laïd	34	11	12	11	40	41	−1	45
13	NC Magra	34	13	6	15	31	36	−5	45
14	RC Arbaâ	34	10	13	11	40	45	−5	43

Updated to match(es) played on 17 June 2022. Source: the-sports.org
Rules for classification: 1) points; 2) head-to-head points; 3) head-to-head goal difference; 4) goal difference; 5) total goals; 6) fairplay ranking; 7) playoff.

==== Results summary ====
Overall								Home						Away					
Pld	W	D	L	GF	GA	GD	Pts	W	D	L	GF	GA	GD	W	D	L	GF	GA	GD
34	11	12	11	40	41	−1	45	8	7	2	21	9	+12	3	5	9	19	32	−13

Last updated: 10 June 2022.
Source: Competitive matches

==== Results by round ====
Round	1	2	3	4	5	6	7	8	9	10	11	12	13	14	15	16	17	18	19	20	21	22	23	24	25	26	27	28	29	30	31	32	33	34
Ground	A	H	A	H	A	H	H	A	H	A	H	A	H	A	H	A	H	H	A	H	A	H	A	A	H	A	H	A	H	A	H	A	H	A
Result	L	L	D	D	L	D	D	L	W	D	D	L	W	L	D	L	W	W	L	D	L	W	D	W	L	L	D	W	W	W	W	D	W	D
Position	16	16	17	16	17	16	15	16	14	14	13	16	13	15	15	16	13	13	13	13	13	13	13	13	13	13	13	13	13	12	12	13	12	12

Updated to match(es) played on 10 June 2022. Source: Competitive matches
A = Away; H = Home; W = Win; D = Draw; L = Loss

==== Matches ====
The league fixtures were announced on 7 October 2021.

2 November 2021 Round 1	ES Sétif	1–0	HB Chelghoum Laïd	Sétif
15:00	Kendouci 90'	Report		Stadium: Stade 8 Mai 1945; Attendance: 0 (close doors); Referee: Riadh Ammar Khodja

29 October 2021 Round 2	HB Chelghoum Laïd	0–1	NA Hussein Dey	Chelghoum Laïd
15:00		Report	Nadji 67'	Stadium: 11 December 1961 Stadium; Referee: Ali Nader

7 November 2021 Round 3	RC Arbaâ	0–0	HB Chelghoum Laïd	Boufarik
15:00		Report		Stadium: Stade Mohamed Reggaz; Referee: Mahdi Dehina

19 November 2021 Round 4	HB Chelghoum Laïd	0–0	JS Saoura	Chelghoum Laïd
15:00		Report		Stadium: 11 December 1961 Stadium; Referee: Nabil Boukhalfa

25 November 2021 Round 5	US Biskra	2–0	HB Chelghoum Laïd	Biskra
14:30	Mokhtar 18'; Khoualed 73'	Report		Stadium: Stade du 18 Février; Referee: Hamza Bouslimani

4 December 2021 Round 6	HB Chelghoum Laïd	0–0	USM Alger	Chelghoum Laïd
14:30	Benchoucha (yellow card) 33'; Haddad (yellow card) 70'; Elmenaouer (yellow card) 75'	Report	Bouchina (yellow card) 85'; Belaïd (yellow card) 90'	Stadium: 11 December 1961 Stadium; Referee: Mustapha Ghorbal

11 December 2021 Round 7	HB Chelghoum Laïd	1–1	RC Relizane	Chelghoum Laïd
14:30	Benamrane 2'		Baleh 11'	Stadium: 11 December 1961 Stadium; Referee: Hamza Bouslimani

17 December 2021 Round 8	JS Kabylie	1–0	HB Chelghoum Laïd	Tizi Ouzou
17:00	Talah 69'	Report		Stadium: Stade 1er Novembre 1954; Referee: Mohamed Boutaraa

24 December 2021 Round 9	HB Chelghoum Laïd	1–0	ASO Chlef	Chelghoum Laïd
15:00	Khaldi 80'	Report		Stadium: 11 December 1961 Stadium; Referee: Abderrezzak Arab

28 December 2021 Round 10	MC Oran	2–2	HB Chelghoum Laïd	Oran
18:00	Bouguettaya 39'; Cheurfaoui 84' (o.g.)	Report	Belaribi 70'; Khaldi 73' (pen.)	Stadium: Ahmed Zabana Stadium; Referee: Lyés Bekouassa

2 January 2022 Round 11	HB Chelghoum Laïd	0–0	CR Belouizdad	Chelghoum Laïd
14:00		Report		Stadium: 11 December 1961 Stadium; Referee: Nabil Boukhalfa

8 January 2022 Round 12	NC Magra	2–0	HB Chelghoum Laïd	Magra
14:30	Bouguèche 42'; Bouchouareb 74'	Report		Stadium: Boucheligue Brothers Stadium; Referee: Bilal Bendjahene

15 January 2022 Round 13	HB Chelghoum Laïd	3–1	WA Tlemcen	Chelghoum Laïd
14:30	Kemoukh 45'; Ghorab 58' (pen.), 73'	Report	Mebarki 89'	Stadium: 11 December 1961 Stadium; Referee: Amine Hansal

21 January 2022 Round 14	MC Alger	1–0	HB Chelghoum Laïd	Algiers
17:00	Frioui 31' (pen.)	Report		Stadium: Stade du 5 Juillet; Attendance: 0 (close doors); Referee: Mohamed Kralifa

25 January 2022 Round 15	HB Chelghoum Laïd	1–1	CS Constantine	Chelghoum Laïd
14:30	Benamrane 31'	Report	Koukpo 6'	Stadium: 11 December 1961 Stadium; Referee: Lotfi Bekouassa

29 January 2022 Round 16	Paradou AC	6–2	HB Chelghoum Laïd	Dar El Beïda
14:30	Benbouali 8'; Titraoui 21'; Boulbina 45+1'; Bouzok 46'; Mouali 68'; Zerrouki 82'	Report	Kemoukh 8'; Aïb 90+3'	Stadium: Omar Benrabah Stadium; Referee: Bilel Soltani

5 February 2022 Round 17	HB Chelghoum Laïd	2–0	Olympique de Médéa	Chelghoum Laïd
14:30	Hadji 45+2'; Kemoukh 57'	Report		Stadium: 11 December 1961 Stadium; Referee: Malek Ait Ameur

1 March 2022 Round 19	NA Hussein Dey	2–1	HB Chelghoum Laïd	Belouizdad
14:00	Aggoun 33'; Benayad 64'	Report	Demane 47'	Stadium: 20 August 1955 Stadium; Attendance: 0 (close doors); Referee: Abdellah Benchehida

5 March 2022 Round 20	HB Chelghoum Laïd	1–1	RC Arbaâ	Chelghoum Laïd
14:30	Khaldi 57'	Report	Boubakour 67'	Stadium: 11 December 1961 Stadium; Referee: Bilal Bendjahene

18 March 2022 Round 22	HB Chelghoum Laïd	3–1	US Biskra	Chelghoum Laïd
15:00	Aïb 9'; Tarek Cheurfaoui 24'; Harrari 64'	Report	Ghassiri 17'	Stadium: 11 December 1961 Stadium; Referee: Lyés Bekouassa

22 March 2022 Round 18	HB Chelghoum Laïd	1–0	ES Sétif	Chelghoum Laïd
15:00	Hadded 83'	Report		Stadium: 11 December 1961 Stadium; Referee: Mohamed Boutaraa

26 March 2022 Round 23	USM Alger	1–1	HB Chelghoum Laïd	Bologhine
18:00	Opoku 27'	Report	Khaldi 25'	Stadium: Omar Hamadi Stadium; Attendance: 0 (close doors); Referee: Zakaria Antar

31 March 2022 Round 24	RC Relizane	1–2	HB Chelghoum Laïd	Relizane
15:00	Si Ammar 36'	Report	Aïb 69'; Harrari 75'	Stadium: Tahar Zoughari Stadium; Referee: Hamza Bouslimani

8 April 2022 Round 21	JS Saoura	5–0	HB Chelghoum Laïd	Béchar
22:00	Lahmeri 18' (pen.); Bellatreche 49', 61'; Amrane 69'; Boubekeur 82'	Report		Stadium: 20 August 1955 Stadium; Referee: Mohamed Amine Benzohra

13 April 2022 Round 25	HB Chelghoum Laïd	1–3	JS Kabylie	Chelghoum Laïd
15:45	Khaldi 44'	Report	Mouaki 36'; Bensayah 64'; Nezla 90+1'	Stadium: 11 December 1961 Stadium; Referee: Bilel Soltani

17 April 2022 Round 26	ASO Chlef	1–0	HB Chelghoum Laïd	Chlef
23:30	Alili 77' (pen.)	Report		Stadium: Mohamed Boumezrag Stadium; Referee: Lahlou Benbraham

23 April 2022 Round 27	HB Chelghoum Laïd	0–0	MC Oran	Chelghoum Laïd
15:45		Report		Stadium: 11 December 1961 Stadium; Referee: Lotfi Bekouassa

29 April 2022 Round 28	CR Belouizdad	0–1	HB Chelghoum Laïd	Belouizdad
16:45		Report	Harrari 12'	Stadium: 20 August 1955 Stadium; Attendance: 0 (close doors); Referee: Ali Nader

7 May 2022 Round 29	HB Chelghoum Laïd	2–0	NC Magra	Chelghoum Laïd
16:00	Harrari 8'; Demane 87'	Report		Stadium: 11 December 1961 Stadium; Referee: Youcef Taieb Bouderbal

14 May 2022 Round 30	WA Tlemcen	1–4	HB Chelghoum Laïd	Tlemcen
16:00	Lakehal 63'	Report	Harrari 7', 8'; Kaibou 23'; Medjahdaoui 77' (o.g.)	Stadium: Colonel Lotfi Stadium; Referee: Ahmed Benhamou

21 May 2022 Round 31	HB Chelghoum Laïd	2–0	MC Alger	Chelghoum Laïd
17:00	Khaldi 86'; Aib 90+1'	Report		Stadium: 11 December 1961 Stadium; Referee: Abderrezzak Arab

27 May 2022 Round 32	CS Constantine	3–3	HB Chelghoum Laïd	Constantine
16:45	Lakdja 3'; Koukpo 28'; Aiboud 82'	Report	Demane 4', 89'; Khaldi 27'	Stadium: Ramadane Ben Abdelmalek Stadium; Referee: Lyés Bekouassa

3 June 2022 Round 33	HB Chelghoum Laïd	3–0	Paradou AC	Chelghoum Laïd
16:45	Demane 29'; Boukebal 59' (o.g.); Belkacemi 82'	Report		Stadium: 11 December 1961 Stadium; Referee: Mohamed Ali Nader

10 June 2022 Round 34	Olympique de Médéa	3–3	HB Chelghoum Laïd	Médéa
17:45	Laidouni 13'; Bouras 51'; Attallah 53'	Report	Demane 29', 90+1'; Harrari 87'	Stadium: Imam Lyes Stadium; Referee: Hamlaoui Brahim

== Squad information ==
=== Playing statistics ===
No.	Pos	Nat	Player	Total		Ligue 1	
No.	Pos	Nat	Player	Apps	Goals	Apps	Goals
Goalkeepers
1	GK	(Algeria) ALG	Fetheddine Alaoui	25	0	25	0
16	GK	(Algeria) ALG	Abdelhak Mouaici	8	0	8	0
30	GK	(Algeria) ALG	Saber Meddour	4	0	4	0
Defenders
3	DF	(Algeria) ALG	Chakib Benhmadou	0	0	0	0
12	DF	(Algeria) ALG	Tarek Cheurfaoui	27	1	27	1
15	DF	(Algeria) ALG	Hichem Lalaouna	25	0	25	0
20	DF	(Algeria) ALG	Zakaria Zaitri	24	0	24	0
22	DF	(Algeria) ALG	Achref Aïb	31	4	31	4
23	DF	(Algeria) ALG	Abdelhak Belkacemi	16	1	16	1
24	DF	(Algeria) ALG	Salah Dadache	1	0	1	0
25	DF	(Algeria) ALG	Kheireddine Benamrane	24	2	24	2
Midfielders
4	MF	(Algeria) ALG	Mohamed Belaribi	26	1	26	1
5	MF	(Algeria) ALG	Mustapha Oultache	1	0	1	0
8	MF	(Algeria) ALG	Islam Siab	1	0	1	0
10	MF	(Algeria) ALG	Mohamed Taib	13	0	13	0
13	MF	(Algeria) ALG	Sid Ali Lamri	26	0	26	0
14	MF	(Algeria) ALG	Foued Hadded	28	1	28	1
18	MF	(Algeria) ALG	Abdelmalek Elmenaouer	6	0	6	0
19	MF	(Algeria) ALG	Salaheddine Harrari	23	7	23	7
26	MF	(Algeria) ALG	Youcef Belamri	8	0	8	0
27	MF	(Algeria) ALG	Omar Boudoumi	11	0	11	0
Forwards
6	FW	(Algeria) ALG	Abdelali Hadji	20	1	20	1
7	FW	(Algeria) ALG	Abdelkader Kaibou	22	1	22	1
9	FW	(Algeria) ALG	Hamza Demane	14	7	14	7
11	FW	(Algeria) ALG	Abdelkader Ghorab	27	2	27	2
17	FW	(Algeria) ALG	Naoufel Righi	0	0	0	0
21	FW	(Algeria) ALG	Ahmed Khaldi	27	7	27	7
Players transferred out during the season
10	MF	(Algeria) ALG	Zakaria Kemoukh	15	3	15	3
9	FW	(Algeria) ALG	Lamine Abid	6	0	6	0
27	FW	(Algeria) ALG	Mohamed Saïd Bouchoucha	7	0	7	0

Last updated: 10 June 2022
Source: soccerway.com

=== Goalscorers ===
Includes all competitive matches. The list is sorted alphabetically by surname when total goals are equal.

No.	Nat.	Player	Pos.	L 1	TOTAL
9	(Algeria)	Hamza Demane	FW	7	7
21	(Algeria)	Ahmed Khaldi	FW	7	7
19	(Algeria)	Salaheddine Harrari	MF	7	7
22	(Algeria)	Achref Aïb	DF	4	4
10	(Algeria)	Achref Aïb	MF	3	3
11	(Algeria)	Abdelkader Ghorab	FW	2	2
25	(Algeria)	Zakaria Kemoukh	DF	2	2
12	(Algeria)	Zakaria Kemoukh	DF	1	1
23	(Algeria)	Abdelhak Belkacemi	DF	1	1
4	(Algeria)	Mohamed Belaribi	MF	1	1
14	(Algeria)	Foued Hadded	MF	1	1
6	(Algeria)	Abdelali Hadji	FW	1	1
7	(Algeria)	Abdelkader Kaibou	FW	1	1
Own Goals				2	2
Totals				40	40
