= List of CS Constantine seasons =

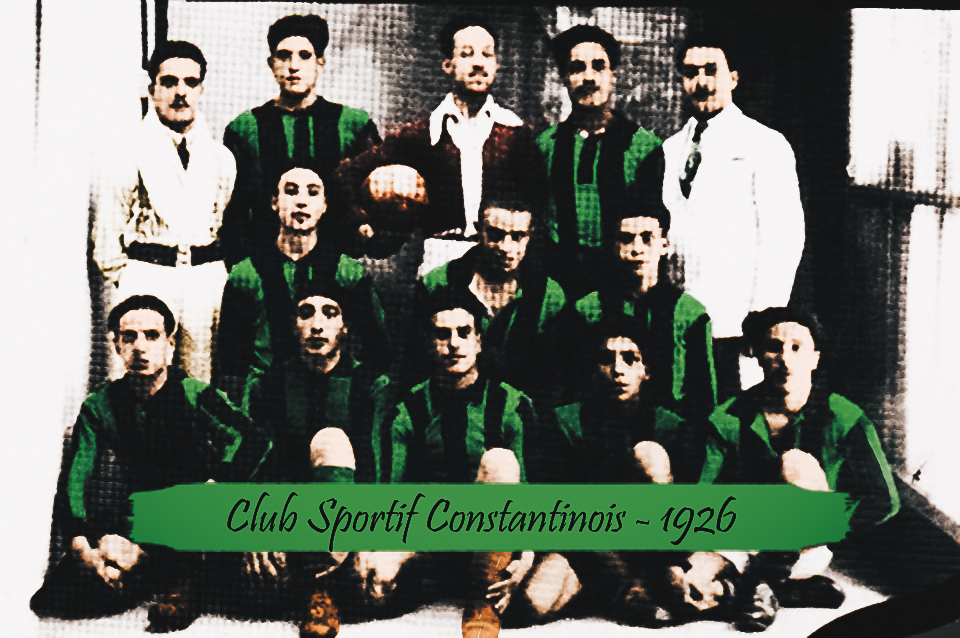
Club Sportif Constantinois 1926.

Club sportif constantinois is an Algerian professional football club based in Constantine, Constantine Province. The founding date recognized by the LFP is June 26, 1898. the professional football league does not cite any date of creation of the club and uses the CS Constantine logo, which bears the founding date of 1898. The club still insists on the date of June 26, 1898, which would make the club among the deans of Algerian and African football. The main argument put forward by CS Constantine is that the latter has existed under different acronyms throughout its history, while keeping the same colors and the same values. Thus, from 1898 to 1912, the club would have been called IKBAL Émancipation. Then, it reappeared from 1916 to 1918 under the name of Étoile club musulman constantinois, to finally become in 1898, the current Club sportif constantinois.

This is a list of the seasons played by CS Constantine from 1962 when the club first entered a league competition to the most recent seasons. Top scorers in bold were also top scorers of Ligue 1. The list is separated into three parts, coinciding with the three major episodes of Algerian football:

== Seasons ==
=== Before independence ===
Below, the CS Constantine season-by-season record before independence in the French Algeria period :

=== After independence ===
Below, the CS Constantine season-by-season record after independence of Algeria :

Season	League									Cup	Other	Africa		Top goalscorer(s) (Note: Goals in all competitions (Algerian Ligue Professionnelle 1, Algerian Cup, League Cup, African and Super Cup) are counted.)		
Season	Division	Pos	Pts	P	W	D	L	GF	GA	Cup	Other	Africa		Name	Goals	Ref.
1994–95	Division 1	8th	30	30	12	7	11	24	27	R64				Mouloud Kaoua	6	
1995–96	Division 1	6th	43	30	11	10	9	25	20	R16	Grp			Mouloud Kaoua	6	
1996–97	Division 1	**1st**	56	30	17	5	8	44	28	R16				Rachid Amrane	7	
1997–98	Division 1	2nd (Note: CS Constantine took second place in Group A in a Ligue held in two groups of eight teams.)	24	14	7	4	3	17	12	R64	R16	Champions League	R1	Isâad Bourahli	6	
1998–99	Super Division	7th (Note: CS Constantine took seven place in Group A in a Ligue held in two groups of 14 teams.)	40	26	11	7	8	26	21	R64				Réda Zouani	6	
1999–2000	National 1	2nd	52	26	15	7	4	45	15	QF	Grp			Mouloud Kaoua	14	
2000–01	Super Division	16th	19	30	4	7	19	17	45	QF				Yacine Bezzaz	4	
2001–02	Division 1	2nd	51	30	14	9	7	32	27	R64						
2002–03	Division 2	2nd (Note: CS Constantine took second place in Central-Eastern Group in a Ligue held in two groups of 16 teams.)	63	28	20	3	5	41	16	R32						
2003–04	Division 2	**1st** (Note: CS Constantine took first place in East Group in a Ligue held in three groups of 16 teams.)	63	30	19	6	5	46	14	R64						
2004–05	Division 1	8th	40	30	11	7	12	33	42	R16				Hocine Fenier	10	
2005–06	Division 1	14th	36	30	10	6	14	27	36	R16				Seifeddine Amroune	9	
2006–07	Division 2	5th	54	34	15	9	10	36	30	R16				Zoheïr Othmane Ouachem	9	
2007–08	Division 2	10th	47	36	12	11	13	36	33	R32				Farès Laouni	16	
2008–09	Division 2	8th	45	32	12	9	11	29	32	R32						
2009–10	Division 2	7th	50	34	13	11	10	30	29	R64						
2010–11	Ligue 2	**1st**	56	30	14	14	2	35	15	R32						
2011–12	Ligue 1	12th	36	30	8	12	10	35	42	SF				Fouad Bouguerra	8	
2012–13	Ligue 1	3rd	52	30	13	13	4	37	20	QF				Hamza Boulemdaïs	13	
2013–14	Ligue 1	10th	41	30	10	11	9	30	31	QF		Confederation Cup	R2	Hamza Boulemdaïs	14	
2014–15	Ligue 1	5th	42	30	11	9	10	32	31	R16				Hamza Boulemdaïs	15	
2015–16	Ligue 1	8th	42	30	11	9	10	26	32	R64		Confederation Cup	R2	Yacine Bezzaz	7	
2016–17	Ligue 1	9th	39	30	10	9	11	34	33	R32				Manucho	6	
2017–18	Ligue 1	**1st**	57	30	16	9	5	36	26	R32				Lamine Abid	16	
2018–19	Ligue 1	7th	40	30	10	10	10	30	24	SF	RU	Champions League	QF	Ismaïl Belkacemi	10	
2019–20	Ligue 1 (Note: On March 15, 2020, the Ligue de Football Professionnel (LFP) decided to halt the season due to the COVID-19 pandemic in Algeria. On July 29, 2020, the LFP declared that season is over and CR Belouizdad to be the champion, the promotion of four teams from the League 2, and scrapping the relegation for the current season.)	5th	34	22	9	7	6	32	23	R16		Arab Club Champions Cup	R1	Lamine Abid	10	
2020–21	Ligue 1	8th	57	38	15	12	11	43	31	NP	PR			Abdelhakim Amokrane	8	
2021–22	Ligue 1	5th	55	34	15	10	9	46	29	NP				Marcellin Koukpo	11	
2022–23	Ligue 1	2nd	50	30	14	8	8	39	26	R32				Brahim Dib	8	
2023–24	Ligue 1	3rd	53	30	15	8	7	46	30	SF		Champions League	R1	Brahim Dib	13	
2024–25	Ligue 1									R64		Confederation Cup	QF			

== Key ==
Key to league record:

- P = Played
- W = Games won
- D = Games drawn
- L = Games lost
- GF = Goals for
- GA = Goals against
- Pts = Points
- Pos = Final position

Key to divisions:

- 1 = Ligue 1
- 2 = Ligue 2

Key to rounds:

- DNE = Did not enter
- NP = Not played
- PR = Preliminary round
- Grp = Group stage
- R1 = First Round
- R2 = Second Round
- PO = Play-off round

- R32 = Round of 32
- R16 = Round of 16
- QF = Quarter-finals
- SF = Semi-finals
- RU = Runners-up
- W = Winners

Champions	Runners-up	Promoted	Relegated

Division shown in bold to indicate a change in division.
Top scorers shown in bold are players who were also top scorers in their division that season.
