= Ahmed Khaldi =

Algerian footballer (born 1998)

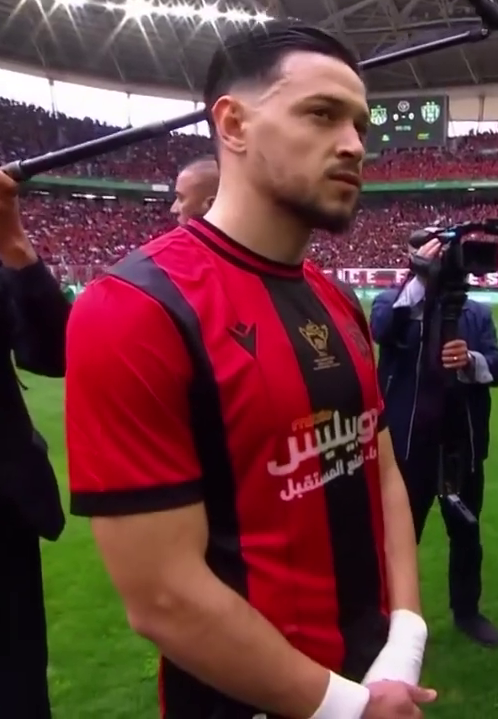
- Ahmed Khaldi in the final of the 2025–26 Algerian Cup

Personal information
- Date of birth: 22 July 1998 (age 28)
- Place of birth: Kaïs, Algeria
- Height: 1.88 m (6 ft 2 in)
- Position: Right winger

Team information
- Current team: USM Alger
- Number: 7

Youth career
- –2016: CRB Kaïs

Senior career*
Years	Team	Apps	(Gls)
2016–2017	CRB Kaïs		
2017–2020	Olympique de Médéa	30	(0)
2020–2021	CA Batna		
2021–2022	HB Chelghoum Laïd	26	(7)
2022–2024	CS Constantine	48	(11)
2024	Al-Arabi	7	(2)
2024–	USM Alger	35	(8)
- * Club domestic league appearances and goals as of 6 June 2026

Ahmed Khaldi (Arabic: أحمد خالدي; born 22 July 1998) is an Algerian professional footballer who plays as a Right winger for USM Alger in the Algerian Ligue Professionnelle 1.

== Career ==
In 2017, Khaldi joined Olympique de Médéa. In 2020, he signed for CA Batna. In 2021, he joined HB Chelghoum Laïd. In 2022, he signed for CS Constantine. In 2024, he joined Kuwaiti club Al-Arabi.

=== USM Alger ===
==== Arrival, domestic success and continental triumphs ====
On 17 December 2024, Ahmed Khaldi became the first winter signing of USM Alger for two and a half years after joining from Al-Arabi. The Algerian forward had terminated his contract with the Kuwaiti club on 5 December before choosing to join the Red and Black despite interest from several Algerian clubs. Khaldi had to wait until 27 March 2025 to score his first goals for USM Alger, producing a brilliant brace against CR Témouchent in the Algerian Cup quarter-finals. Despite making numerous appearances throughout the season, he failed to find the net in the league. However, Khaldi ended the campaign in perfect fashion by scoring a decisive goal against CR Belouizdad in the Algerian Cup final, leading USM Alger to the title and securing the first trophy of his professional career.

In his second season, Ahmed Khaldi established himself as one of the team's key players, featuring as a starter in most matches. Although the club's ambition of winning the Ligue 1 title was not achieved, Khaldi and his teammates continued their dominance in the Algerian Cup, securing the trophy for the second consecutive year against the same opponent. Just like in the previous final, Khaldi played a decisive role by scoring a goal and providing an assist for Kamagaté. On the CAF Confederation Cup stage, Khaldi delivered outstanding performances and guided his club to the final. Khaldi scored a crucial goal in the semi-final second leg against Olympic Safi, securing his team's place in the final. In the first leg against Zamalek, he scored the only goal of the match from the penalty spot. In the second leg, his team clinched the title after a dramatic penalty shootout victory, giving Ahmed Khaldi the first continental trophy of his career.

==== Contract extension and CAF Super Cup triumph ====
On 23 August 2026, USM Alger extended Ahmed Khaldi's contract for two additional seasons as part of the club's efforts to retain key players and maintain squad stability, keeping him at the club until 2030. Ahmed Khaldi stood out during the 2026 CAF Super Cup against Mamelodi Sundowns, played on 8 November 2026 in Pretoria. He contributed to USM Alger’s 3–1 victory by being involved in the opening goal and scoring his team’s third goal in the 53rd minute, following an individual effort down the left flank that he finished with a powerful shot. His performance played an important role in helping USM Alger secure their fourth continental title. After the final whistle, Khaldi highlighted the team's spirit and the support of the fans, who had always believed in their team. "This is a victory of the heart. We dedicate this triumph to everyone who supported us and believed in us. Our victory was thoroughly deserved. I hope this trophy will be followed by others in the coming months," he said.

== Career statistics ==
=== Club ===
As of 20 May 2026

Club	Season	League			Cup		Continental		Other		Total	
Club	Season	Division	Apps	Goals	Apps	Goals	Apps	Goals	Apps	Goals	Apps	Goals
HB Chelghoum Laïd	2021–22	Ligue 1	27	7	—		—		—		27	7
CS Constantine	2022–23	Ligue 1	25	5	2	1	—		—		27	6
CS Constantine	2023–24	Ligue 1	23	6	3	1	2 (Note: All appearance(s) in Champions League)	0	—		28	7
CS Constantine	Total		48	11	5	2	2	0	—		55	13
USM Alger	2024–25	Ligue 1	10	0	5	3	2 (Note: All appearance(s) in CAF Confederation Cup)	0	—		17	3
USM Alger	2025–26	Ligue 1	21	5	6	1	13	4	1 (Note: All appearances in Algerian Super Cup)	0	41	10
USM Alger	2026–27	Ligue 1	0	0	0	0	0	0	0	0	0	0
USM Alger	Total		31	5	11	4	15	4	1	0	58	13
Career total			106	23	16	6	17	4	1	0	140	33

== Honours ==
USM Alger

- Algerian Cup: 2024–25, 2025–26
- CAF Confederation Cup: 2025–26
- CAF Super Cup: 2026
