= Mohamed Amine Madani =

Algerian footballer (born 1993)

Personal information
- Full name: Mohamed Amine Madani
- Date of birth: 20 March 1993 (age 33)
- Place of birth: Oran, Algeria
- Height: 1.89 m (6 ft 2 1/2 in)
- Position: Centre-back

Team information
- Current team: JS Kabylie
- Number: 20

Youth career
- –2015: USM Algiers

Senior career*
Years	Team	Apps	(Gls)
2015–2016	→ MC El Eulma (loan)	30	(0)
2016–2017	→ USM El Harrach (loan)	28	(0)
2017–2018	JS Saoura	19	(0)
2018–2019	MC El Eulma	19	(1)
2019–2020	CS Chebba	22	(2)
2021–2022	NC Magra	15	(0)
2022–2024	CS Constantine	51	(6)
2024–	JS Kabylie	40	(5)

International career^{‡}
2013	Algeria U20	3	(0)
2017–2025	Algeria A'	5	(0)
2024–	Algeria	4	(0)
- * Club domestic league appearances and goals as of 18:55, 29 April 2026 (UTC) ‡ National team caps and goals as of 16:00, 14 November 2025 (UTC)

Mohamed Amine Madani (Arabic: محمد الأمين مداني; Tamazight: ⵎⵓⵀⴰⵎⴻⴷ ⴰⵎⵉⵏⴻ ⵎⴰⴷⴰⵏⵉ; born 20 March 1993) is an Algerian professional footballer who plays as a centre-back for Algerian Ligue 1 club JS Kabylie and the Algerian national football team.

== Club career ==
Madani graduated from the USM Alger Academy, but he did not play a single match for the club.

In 2014, Madani was loaned to MC El Eulma who were then qualified for the CAF Champions League, he made his senior debut at 22 years old. In 2016, he was loaned for two seasons to USM El Harrach and helped the club achieved promotion to Algerian Ligue 1. He then moved to JS Saoura in 2017.

In 2024, after a great season with CS Constantine, Madani received honorary diplomas and merit trophies from the La Radieuse Sports Association. In the same season, he joined JS Kabylie signing a three-seasons contract with the Kabyle club.

== International career ==
Madani was named in Algeria U20's squad for the 2013 African U-20 Championship. However, the team was knocked-out in the group stage.

In 2025, Madani was called up for the national team by coach Vladimir Petković for the 2026 World Cup Qualification. He made his national debut in a friendly match against Uganda.

In April 2025, Madani was called by Madjid Bougherra to play a decisive double confrontation against Gambia, with the Algeria A' football team, as part of the second round of the qualifiers, for the 2024 CHAN.

== Honours ==
=== NC Magra ===
- Algerian League Cup runner-up: 2020–21

=== JS Saoura ===
- Algerian Ligue 1 runner-up: 2017–18

=== CS Constantine ===
- Algerian Ligue 1 runner-up: 2022–23

=== JS Kabylie ===
- Algerian Ligue 1 runner-up: 2024–25
