= 11 December 1961 Stadium =

Sports stadium in Algeria

Coordinates: 36.156403°N 6.172155°E

11 December 1961 Demonstrations Stadium
- Interactive map of 11 December 1961 Demonstrations Stadium
- Full name: 11 December 1961 Demonstrations Stadium
- Location: Chelghoum Laïd, Algeria
- Operator: APC Chelghoum Laïd
- Capacity: 10,000
- Surface: Artificial turf
- Field size: 100 metres (330 feet) × 60 metres (200 feet)

Tenant
- HB Chelghoum Laïd

11 December 1961 Demonstrations Stadium (Arabic: ملعب مظاهرات 11 ديسمبر 1961), is a multi-use stadium in Chelghoum Laïd, Algeria. It is currently used mostly for football matches and is the home ground of HB Chelghoum Laïd. The stadium has a capacity of 10,000 spectators.
