= Samir Aiboud =

Algerian footballer (born 1993)

Personal information
- Full name: Samir Aiboud
- Date of birth: February 11, 1993 (age 33)
- Place of birth: Tizi Ouzou, Algeria

Team information
- Current team: ASO Chlef
- Number: 17

Youth career
- 2005–2013: JS Kabylie

Senior career*
Years	Team	Apps	(Gls)
2013–2017	JS Kabylie	70	(3)
2017–2019	ES Sétif	39	(3)
2019–2021	CR Belouizdad	18	(0)
2021–2023	CS Constantine	36	(7)
2023–2024	Al-Sahel		
2024	Mudhar		
2024–2026	USM Khenchela	29	(1)
2026–	ASO Chlef	13	(0)

International career^{‡}
2014	Algeria U23	1	(0)
- * Club domestic league appearances and goals as of 5 June 2026 ‡ National team caps and goals as of 00:00, July 17, 2017 (EST)

Samir Aiboud (Arabic: سمير عيبود; born February 2, 1993) is an Algerian footballer who plays as a midfielder for ASO Chlef.

== Club career ==
On February 22, 2013, Aiboud made his senior debut for JS Kabylie, coming as a substitute in the 61st minute in a league match against CR Belouizdad.

In 2019, Aiboud signed a contract with CR Belouizdad.

In 2021, he joined CS Constantine.

On 22 January 2024, Aiboud joined Mudhar.
