= Brahim Dib =

Algerian footballer (born 1993)

Personal information
- Date of birth: 6 July 1993 (age 33)
- Place of birth: El Khroub, Algeria
- Height: 1.86 m (6 ft 1 in)
- Position: Midfielder

Team information
- Current team: CS Constantine
- Number: 10

Youth career
- –2013: AS Khroub

Senior career*
| Years | Team | Apps | (Gls) |
| 2013–2017 | AS Khroub | 89 | (14) |
| 2017–2018 | AS Aïn M'lila | 26 | (8) |
| 2018–2019 | NA Hussein Dey | 15 | (3) |
| 2019–2020 | AS Aïn M'lila | 18 | (3) |
| 2020– | CS Constantine | 164 | (40) |
- * Club domestic league appearances and goals as of 5 June 2026

Brahim Dib (Arabic: إبراهيم ذيب; born 6 July 1993) is an Algerian professional footballer who plays for CS Constantine in the Algerian Ligue Professionnelle 1. He is the captain of the club. Dib was chosen for the 2024–25 CAF Confederation Cup Best 11.

== Career ==
In 2018, Dib joined NA Hussein Dey. In August 2019, he returned to AS Aïn M'lila. In 2020, Dib signed a contract with CS Constantine. In 2024, he extended his contract with CS Constantine until 2027.
