= Marcellin Koukpo =

Beninese footballer

Personal information
- Full name: Marcellin Dègnon Koukpo
- Date of birth: 6 April 1995 (age 31)
- Place of birth: Cotonou, Benin
- Height: 1.76 m (5 ft 9 in)
- Position: Striker

Senior career*
Years	Team	Apps	(Gls)
2014–2015	Energie		
2016	USS Kraké		
2017	Buffles du Borgou		
2018–2020	CS Hammam-Lif	37	(7)
2020–2021	CR Belouizdad	19	(2)
2021–2023	CS Constantine	53	(16)
2023–2024	Al-Sahel		
2024–2025	Najran		
2025–2026	Al-Safa		

International career^{‡}
- Benin U20
2017–	Benin	12	(2)
- * Club domestic league appearances and goals as of 15 July 2023 ‡ National team caps and goals as of August 2020

Marcellin Dègnon Koukpo (born 6 April 1995) is a Beninese international footballer who plays as a striker.

== Club career ==
Koukpo signed for Algerian club CR Belouizdad in September 2020 on a three-year contract.

In 2021, Koukpo signed a two-year contract with CS Constantine.

On 8 September 2024, Koukpo joined Najran. On 1 October 2025, Koukpo joined Al-Safa.

== International career ==
At the youth level he played in 2015 African U-20 Championship qualifiers.

=== International goals ===
Scores and results list Benin's goal tally first.

No.	Date	Venue	Opponent	Score	Result	Competition
1.	4 May 2017	Stade du 4 Août, Ouagadougou, Burkina Faso	Burkina Faso	1–1	1–1	Friendly
2.	12 August 2017	Stade de Kégué, Lomé, Togo	Togo	1–0	1–1	2018 African Nations Championship qualification
