= Ramdane Ben Abdelmalek Stadium =

Sports stadium in Algeria

Coordinates: 36°20′57″N 6°37′33″E

- Turpin
- Interactive map of Ramdane Ben Abdelmalek Stadium
- Location: Constantine, Algeria
- Owner: APC Constantine
- Operator: APC of Constantine
- Capacity: 8,000
- Surface: Artificial turf

Construction
- Opened: 1848
- Renovated: 2006, 2009
- Expanded: 2014

Tenants
- MO Constantine; CS Constantine

Ramdane Ben Abdelmalek Stadium (Arabic: ملعب رمضان بن عبد المالك) is a multi-use stadium in Constantine, Algeria. It is currently used mostly for football matches. The stadium holds 8,000 people. It serves as a home ground for MO Constantine and CS Constantine.
