= HB Chelghoum Laïd =

Algerian football club

- Full name: Hilal Baladiat Chelghoum Laïd
- Nicknames: Al Hilal, Croissant
- Founded: 17 July 1945
- Ground: 11 December 1961 Stadium
- Capacity: 10,000
- League: Interregional League
- 2025–26: Ligue 2, Group Centre-east, 16th of 16 (relegated)
Home colours	Away colours

Hilal Baladiat Chelghoum Laïd (Arabic: هلال بلدية شلغوم العيد), known as HB Chelghoum Laïd or simply HBCL for short, is an Algerian football club located in Chelghoum Laïd in Mila Province. The club was founded in 17 July 1945 and the team's color's are white and green. Their home stadium, 11 December 1961 Stadium, has a capacity of some 10,000 spectators. The club is currently playing in the Interregional League.

== History ==
On August 5, 2020, HB Chelghoum Laïd were promoted to the Algerian Ligue 2.

On July 18, 2021, HB Chelghoum Laïd were promoted to the Algerian Ligue Professionnelle 1.

== Honors ==
=== Domestic competitions ===
- Algerian Ligue 2
  - Champion (1): 2020–21
