= 2021–22 US Biskra season =

US Biskra
2021–22 season
- President: Abdelkader Triaa
- Head coach: Youcef Bouzidi (from 28 September 2021)
- Stadium: 18 February Stadium
- Ligue 1: 10th
- Top goalscorer: League: Hichem Mokhtar (12 goals); All: Hichem Mokhtar (12 goals)
- Biggest win: 5–0 vs RC Arbaâ (A) (23 October 2021)
- Biggest defeat: 0–3 vs USM Alger (A) (20 November 2021)

In the 2021–22 season, US Biskra competed in the Ligue 1 for the fifth season, as well as the Algerian Cup. It was their third consecutive season in the top flight of Algerian football.

== Squad list ==
Players and squad numbers last updated on 20 October 2021.
Note: Flags indicate national team as has been defined under FIFA eligibility rules. Players may hold more than one non-FIFA nationality.

No.	Nat.	Position	Name	Date of birth (age)	Signed from
Goalkeepers
1	(Algeria)	GK	Abderrahmane Bouchareb	10 February 1999 (aged 22)	(Algeria) Youth system
13	(Algeria)	GK	Walid Ouabdi	12 June 1995 (aged 26)	(Algeria) SC Aïn Defla
16	(Algeria)	GK	Ali Bencherif	26 September 1988 (aged 33)	(Algeria) MO Béjaïa
Defenders
3	(Algeria)	RB	Mohamed Assil Sioued	13 October 1998 (aged 23)	(Algeria) Youth system
4	(Algeria)	CB	Tarek Adouane	25 February 1997 (aged 24)	(Algeria) CRB Ouled Djellal
14	(Algeria)	CB	Mohamed Ikbal Boufligha	28 September 1993 (aged 28)	(Algeria) CR Village Moussa
17	(Algeria)	RB	Bilal Boukarroum	19 December 1993 (aged 28)	(Algeria) JSM Skikda
20	(Algeria)	CB	Nacereddine Khoualed	16 April 1986 (aged 35)	(Algeria) JS Saoura
23	(Algeria)	CB	Adel Lakhdari	12 August 1989 (aged 32)	(Algeria) MC Oran
26	(Algeria)	CB	Hamza Salem	10 January 1998 (aged 23)	(Algeria) Youth system
Midfielders
5	(Algeria)	MF	Ali Amriche	8 December 1998 (aged 23)	(Algeria) CA Bordj Bou Arreridj
6	(Algeria)	MF	Hamza Heriat	6 September 1987 (aged 34)	(Algeria) MC Oran
8	(Algeria)	MF	Mustapha Zeghnoun	30 June 1991 (aged 30)	(Algeria) ASO Chlef
11	(Algeria)	MF	Hamza Ounnas	18 December 1988 (aged 33)	(Algeria) USM Bel Abbès
18	(Algeria)	MF	Mohamed Fenniri	20 January 1998 (aged 23)	(Algeria) Paradou AC
22	(Algeria)	MF	Hatem Dakhia	28 March 1991 (aged 30)	(Algeria) ASO Chlef
24	(Algeria)	MF	Noufel Ghassiri	12 January 1988 (aged 33)	(Algeria) Unattached
25	(Algeria)	MF	Mohamed Chaibeddra Tani	1 August 1991 (aged 30)	(Algeria) Unattached
27	(Algeria)	MF	Hamza Yadroudj	3 December 1992 (aged 29)	(Algeria) JS Saoura
Forwards
7	(Algeria)	FW	Youcef Djahnit	11 January 1997 (aged 24)	(Algeria) CS Constantine
9	(Algeria)	FW	Mohamed Larbi Khoualed	3 December 1989 (aged 32)	(Algeria) CRB Ouled Djellal
10	(Algeria)	FW	Hichem Mokhtar	24 October 1991 (aged 30)	(Algeria) JSM Béjaïa
12	(Algeria)	FW	El Hocine Rais	21 December 1997 (aged 24)	(Algeria) GC Mascara
15	(Algeria)	FW	Aimen Djebbar	14 May 1999 (aged 22)	(Algeria) Youth system
21	(Algeria)	FW	Hamza Demane	23 February 1989 (aged 32)	(Algeria) AS Ain M'lila

== Competitions ==
=== Overview ===
Competition	Record								Started round	Final position / round	First match	Last match
Competition	G	W	D	L	GF	GA	GD	Win %	Started round	Final position / round	First match	Last match
Ligue 1	34	13	11	10	36	32	+4	38.24	—N/a	10th	23 October 2021	10 June 2022
Total	34	13	11	10	36	32	+4	38.24				

Updated to match played 10 June 2022
Source: Competitions

== League table ==
Pos	Team	Pld	W	D	L	GF	GA	GD	Pts
8	MC Alger	34	13	12	9	36	24	+12	51
9	ASO Chlef	34	13	11	10	38	31	+7	50 (Note: ASO Chlef finished ahead of US Biskra on head-to-head goal difference: US Biskra 2–1 ASO Chlef, ASO Chlef 2–0 US Biskra.)
10	US Biskra	34	13	11	10	36	32	+4	50
11	MC Oran	34	10	16	8	32	29	+3	46
12	HB Chelghoum Laïd	34	11	12	11	40	41	−1	45

Updated to match(es) played on 17 June 2022. Source: the-sports.org
Rules for classification: 1) points; 2) head-to-head points; 3) head-to-head goal difference; 4) goal difference; 5) total goals; 6) fairplay ranking; 7) playoff.

=== Results summary ===
Overall								Home						Away					
Pld	W	D	L	GF	GA	GD	Pts	W	D	L	GF	GA	GD	W	D	L	GF	GA	GD
34	13	11	10	36	32	+4	50	10	5	2	19	9	+10	3	6	8	17	23	−6

Last updated: 10 June 2022.
Source: Competitive matches

=== Results by round ===
Round	1	2	3	4	5	6	7	8	9	10	11	12	13	14	15	16	17	18	19	20	21	22	23	24	25	26	27	28	29	30	31	32	33	34
Ground	A	H	H	A	H	A	H	A	H	A	H	A	H	A	H	A	H	H	A	A	H	A	H	A	H	A	H	A	H	A	H	A	H	A
Result	W	W	W	L	W	D	W	D	L	L	D	D	W	L	W	L	W	W	L	D	D	L	L	L	D	L	W	W	D	D	W	D	D	W
Position	2	1	1	1	1	1	1	1	5	6	7	8	8	8	8	9	9	6	8	8	9	9	9	10	10	10	10	10	10	10	10	10	10	10

Updated to match(es) played on 17 June 2022. Source: Competitive matches
A = Away; H = Home; W = Win; D = Draw; L = Loss

=== Matches ===
The league fixtures were announced on 7 October 2021.

23 October 2021 Round 1	RC Arbaâ	0–5	US Biskra	Kouba
16:00		Report	Khoualed 2', 34'; Mokhtar 50', 76' (pen.); Djahnit 55'	Stadium: Mohamed Benhaddad Stadium; Attendance: 0 (Note: The match was played behind closed doors due to the COVID-19 pandemic in Algeria.); Referee: Youcef Taieb Bouderbal

29 October 2021 Round 2	US Biskra	2–1	JS Saoura	Biskra
15:00	Djahnit 10', 61'	Report	Lahmeri 80' (pen.)	Stadium: 18 February Stadium; Referee: Youcef Gamouh

7 November 2021 Round 3	US Biskra	1–0	RC Relizane	Biskra
15:00	Mokhtar 27' (pen.)	Report		Stadium: 18 February Stadium; Referee: Bilel Soltani

20 November 2021 Round 4	USM Alger	3–0	US Biskra	Bologhine
18:00	Benhammouda 15', 21'; Radouani (yellow card) 76'; Belkacemi 82' (pen.)	Report	Zobir (yellow card) 7'; Rais (yellow card) 73'; Boulanouar (yellow card) 76'	Stadium: Omar Hamadi Stadium; Attendance: 0 (close doors); Referee: Mehdi Abid Charef

25 November 2021 Round 5	US Biskra	2–0	HB Chelghoum Laïd	Biskra
14:30	Mokhtar 18'; Khoualed 73'	Report		Stadium: 18 February Stadium; Referee: Hamza Bouslimani

10 December 2021 Round 7	US Biskra	2–0	ASO Chlef	Biskra
15:00	Mokhtar 50' (pen.), 64'	Report		Stadium: 18 February Stadium; Referee: Lyés Bekouassa

17 December 2021 Round 8	MC Oran	2–2	US Biskra	Oran
16:00	Dahar 66'; Alati 69'	Report	M.Khoualed 61'; Ounnas 90+3'	Stadium: Ahmed Zabana Stadium; Referee: Mohamed Amine Benzohra

24 December 2022 Round 9	US Biskra	0–1	CR Belouizdad	Biskra
15:00		Report	Keddad 45+4'	Stadium: 18 February Stadium; Referee: Abdellah Benchehida

29 December 2021 Round 10	NC Magra	1–0	US Biskra	Magra
14:30	Bouguèche 16'	Report		Stadium: Boucheligue Brothers Stadium; Referee: Amine Sekhraoui

3 January 2022 Round 11	US Biskra	0–0	WA Tlemcen	Biskra
14:00		Report		Stadium: 18 February Stadium; Referee: Lotfi Bekouassa

7 January 2022 Round 12	MC Alger	1–1	US Biskra	Algiers
15:00	Hachoud 82'	Report	Ghassiri 61'	Stadium: Stade du 5 Juillet; Attendance: 0 (close doors); Referee: Youcef Taieb Bouderbal

11 January 2021 Round 6	JS Kabylie	1–1	US Biskra	Tizi Ouzou
15:00	Nezla 27'	Report	Mokhtar 53'	Stadium: 1 November 1954 Stadium; Attendance: 0 (close doors); Referee: Youcef Gamouh

16 January 2022 Round 13	US Biskra	2–0	CS Constantine	Biskra
15:00	Boukarroum 42'; Mokhtar 66'	Report		Stadium: 18 February Stadium; Referee: Mohamed Boutaraa

21 January 2022 Round 14	Paradou AC	1–0	US Biskra	Dar El Beïda
15:00	Bouzok 64'	Report		Stadium: Omar Benrabah Stadium; Referee: Houssam Benyahia

25 January 2022 Round 15	US Biskra	2–1	Olympique de Médéa	Biskra
14:30	Ounnas 48'; Mokhtar 55'	Report	Belbey 90'	Stadium: 18 February Stadium; Referee: Hadj Aissa semache

29 January 2022 Round 16	ES Sétif	2–0	US Biskra	Sétif
15:00	Lakhdari 12' (o.g.); Djahnit 34'	Report		Stadium: 8 May 1945 Stadium; Attendance: 0 (close doors); Referee: Abdellah Benchehida

5 February 2022 Round 17	US Biskra	2–1	NA Hussein Dey	Biskra
14:30	Boukarroum 65'; Lakhdari 85'	Report	Bouloudene 33'	Stadium: 18 February Stadium; Referee: Mohamad Salah Dafri

25 February 2022 Round 18	US Biskra	1–0	RC Arbaâ	Biskra
14:30	Mokhtar 12'	Report		Stadium: 18 February Stadium; Referee: Mohamed Saidi

24 March 2022 Round 19	JS Saoura	2–0	US Biskra	Béchar
17:00	Saâd 60', 86'	Report		Stadium: 20 August 1955 Stadium; Referee: Malek Ait Ameur

5 March 2022 Round 20	RC Relizane	1–1	US Biskra	Relizane
14:30	Si Ammar 33'	Report	Lakhdari 15'	Stadium: Tahar Zoughari Stadium; Referee: Mohamed Benzahra

11 March 2022 Round 21	US Biskra	0–0	USM Alger	Biskra
14:30	Djahnit (yellow card) 45+5'; Boufligha (yellow card) 54'	Report	Merbah (red card) 22'	Stadium: 18 February Stadium; Referee: Mohamed Ali Nader

18 March 2022 Round 22	HB Chelghoum Laïd	3–1	US Biskra	Chelghoum Laïd
15:00	Aïb 9'; Tarek Cheurfaoui 24'; Harrari 64'	Report	Ghassiri 17'	Stadium: 11 December 1961 Stadium; Referee: Lyés Bekouassa

28 March 2022 Round 23	US Biskra	0–1	JS Kabylie	Biskra
15:00		Report	Ouattara 16'	Stadium: 18 February Stadium; Referee: Mohamed Boutaraa

1 April 2022 Round 24	ASO Chlef	2–0	US Biskra	Chlef
16:00	Fourloul 45+2' (pen.); Baaziz 58'	Report		Stadium: Mohamed Boumezrag Stadium; Referee: Abderrezzak Arab

13 April 2022 Round 25	US Biskra	2–2	MC Oran	Biskra
22:00	Lakhdari 29'; Khoualed 90+4'	Report	Guenina 53'; Benamar 90+6'	Stadium: 18 February Stadium; Referee: Amine Sekhraoui

22 April 2022 Round 27	US Biskra	1–0	NC Magra	Biskra
22:30	Boukarroum 59' (pen.)	Report		Stadium: 18 February Stadium; Referee: Houssam Benyahia

29 April 2022 Round 28	WA Tlemcen	0–3	US Biskra	Tlemcen
15:45		Report	Khoualed 5'; Mokhtar 18', 80'	Stadium: Colonel Lotfi Stadium; Referee: Mohamed Amine Benzohra

7 May 2022 Round 29	US Biskra	0–0	MC Alger	Biskra
18:00		Report		Stadium: 18 February Stadium; Referee: Mehdi Abid Charef

14 May 2022 Round 30	CS Constantine	0–0	US Biskra	Constantine
16:00		Report		Stadium: Ramadane Ben Abdelmalek Stadium; Referee: Hamza Bouslimani

20 May 2022 Round 31	US Biskra	1–0	Paradou AC	Biskra
17:00	Adouane 21'	Report		Stadium: 18 February Stadium; Referee: Mohamed Saïdi

27 May 2022 Round 32	Olympique de Médéa	1–1	US Biskra	Médéa
16:45	Baâli 55'	Report	Ounnas 13'	Stadium: Imam Lyes Stadium; Referee: Zakaria Antar

31 May 2022 Round 26	CR Belouizdad	2–0	US Biskra	Belouizdad
16:45	Mrezigue 31'; Bousseliou 45'	Report		Stadium: 20 August 1955 Stadium; Attendance: 0 (close doors); Referee: Youcef Taieb Bouderbal

5 June 2022 Round 33	US Biskra	1–1	ES Sétif	Biskra
19:00	Ounnas 16'	Report	Djahnit 8' (pen.)	Stadium: 18 February Stadium; Referee: Hamza Boucetta

10 June 2022 Round 34	NA Hussein Dey	1–2	US Biskra	Belouizdad
16:45	Benseghir 48'	Report	Fenniri 4'; Thamer 7'	Stadium: 20 August 1955 Stadium; Attendance: 0 (close doors); Referee: Lamia Athmane

== Squad information ==
=== Playing statistics ===
No.	Pos	Nat	Player	Total		Ligue 1	
No.	Pos	Nat	Player	Apps	Goals	Apps	Goals
Goalkeepers
1	GK	(Algeria) ALG	Abderrahmane Bouchareb	2	0	2	0
13	GK	(Algeria) ALG	Walid Ouabdi	17	0	17	0
16	GK	(Algeria) ALG	Ali Bencherif	16	0	16	0
Defenders
3	DF	(Algeria) ALG	Mohamed Assil Sioued	9	0	9	0
4	DF	(Algeria) ALG	Tarek Adouane	12	1	12	1
14	DF	(Algeria) ALG	Mohamed Ikbal Boufligha	9	0	9	0
17	DF	(Algeria) ALG	Bilal Boukarroum	25	3	25	3
20	DF	(Algeria) ALG	Nacereddine Khoualed	21	2	21	2
23	DF	(Algeria) ALG	Adel Lakhdari	22	3	22	3
26	DF	(Algeria) ALG	Hamza Salem	27	0	27	0
31	DF	(Algeria) ALG	Ahmed Redha Houhou	5	0	5	0
	DF	(Algeria) ALG	Nour Laid Bouchareb	1	0	1	0
	DF	(Algeria) ALG	Idris Boulanouar	1	0	1	0
Midfielders
5	MF	(Algeria) ALG	Ali Amriche	32	0	32	0
6	MF	(Algeria) ALG	Hamza Heriat	0	0	0	0
8	MF	(Algeria) ALG	Mustapha Zeghnoun	28	0	28	0
11	MF	(Algeria) ALG	Hamza Ounnas	26	4	26	4
18	MF	(Algeria) ALG	Mohamed Fenniri	23	1	23	1
22	MF	(Algeria) ALG	Hatem Dakhia	12	0	12	0
24	MF	(Algeria) ALG	Noufel Ghassiri	21	2	21	2
25	MF	(Algeria) ALG	Mohamed Chaibeddra Tani	5	0	5	0
27	MF	(Algeria) ALG	Hamza Yadroudj	29	0	29	0
28	MF	(Algeria) ALG	Nizar Thamer	6	1	6	1
57	MF	(Algeria) ALG	Mohamed Ihab Zobir	1	0	1	0
	MF	(Algeria) ALG	Aissa Abderrabou	1	0	1	0
Forwards
7	FW	(Algeria) ALG	Youcef Djahnit	26	3	26	3
9	FW	(Algeria) ALG	Mohamed Larbi Khoualed	26	4	26	4
10	FW	(Algeria) ALG	Hichem Mokhtar	31	12	31	12
12	FW	(Algeria) ALG	El Hocine Rais	1	0	1	0
15	FW	(Algeria) ALG	Aimen Djebbar	8	0	8	0
35	FW	(Algeria) ALG	Abdelouahab Merri	17	0	17	0
55	FW	(Algeria) ALG	Mohamed El Amine Nabi	12	0	12	0
	FW	(Algeria) ALG	Abderrahmane Youcef	1	0	1	0
	FW	(Algeria) ALG	Adem Hedagha	1	0	1	0
Players transferred out during the season
21	FW	(Algeria) ALG	Hamza Demane	11	0	11	0

Last updated: 10 June 2022
Source: soccerway.com

=== Goalscorers ===
As of 10 June 2022

Includes all competitive matches. The list is sorted alphabetically by surname when total goals are equal.

No.	Nat.	Player	Pos.	L 1	TOTAL
10	(Algeria)	Hichem Mokhtar	FW	12	12
11	(Algeria)	Hamza Ounnas	MF	4	4
9	(Algeria)	Mohamed Larbi Khoualed	FW	4	4
7	(Algeria)	Youcef Djahnit	FW	3	3
23	(Algeria)	Adel Lakhdari	DF	3	3
17	(Algeria)	Bilal Boukarroum	DF	3	3
20	(Algeria)	Nacereddine Khoualed	DF	2	2
24	(Algeria)	Noufel Ghassiri	MF	2	2
4	(Algeria)	Tarek Adouane	DF	1	1
18	(Algeria)	Mohamed Fenniri	MF	1	1
28	(Algeria)	Nizar Thamer	MF	1	1
Own Goals				0	0
Totals				36	36

== Transfers ==
=== In ===
Date	Pos	Player	From club	Transfer fee	Source
29 September 2021	GK	(Algeria) Walid Ouabdi	SC Aïn Defla	Free transfer	
1 October 2021	FW	(Algeria) Mohamed Larbi Khoualed	CRB Ouled Djellal	Free transfer	
1 October 2021	FW	(Algeria) Hamza Demane	AS Aïn M'lila	Free transfer	
5 October 2021	FW	(Algeria) Mohamed Fenniri	Paradou AC	Loan	
15 October 2021	MF	(Algeria) Ali Amriche	CA Bordj Bou Arréridj	Free transfer	
15 October 2021	FW	(Algeria) Youcef Djahnit	CS Constantine	Free transfer	
18 October 2021	MF	(Algeria) Mustapha Zeghnoun	ASO Chlef	Free transfer	
20 October 2021	MF	(Algeria) Hamza Ounnas	USM Bel Abbès	Free transfer	
20 October 2021	FW	(Algeria) El Hocine Rais	GC Mascara	Free transfer	

=== Out ===
Date	Pos	Player	To club	Transfer fee	Source
18 September 2021	GK	(Algeria) Nafaa Alloui	WA Tlemcen	Free transfer	
7 October 2021	MF	(Algeria) Mohamed Yacine Athmani	USM Khenchela	Free transfer	
8 October 2021	MF	(Algeria) Salah Eddine Djabou	AS Aïn M'lila	Free transfer	
11 October 2021	MF	(Algeria) Chams-Eddine Haddad	RC Arbaâ	Free transfer	
17 October 2021	FW	(Algeria) Youcef Chibane	RC Relizane	Free transfer	
20 October 2021	FW	(Algeria) Seif Zine Toumi	RC Arbaâ	Free transfer	
20 October 2021	MF	(Algeria) Lyes Renai	AS Aïn M'lila	Free transfer	
