= 2020–21 US Biskra season =

US Biskra
2020–21 season
- President: Fares Ben Aissa
- Head coach: Moez Bouakaz (from 4 October 2020) (until 12 January 2021); Azzedine Aït Djoudi (from 31 January 2021)
- Stadium: Stade du 18 Février
- Ligue 1: 14th
- League Cup: Quarter-finals
- Highest home attendance: 0 (Note: no one can attend games due to the COVID-19 pandemic)
- Lowest home attendance: 0 (Note: no one can attend games due to the COVID-19 pandemic)
- Average home league attendance: 0 (Note: no one can attend games due to the COVID-19 pandemic)

In the 2020–21 season, US Biskra is competing in the Ligue 1 for the 4th season, It is their 3rd consecutive season in the top flight of Algerian football.

== Squad list ==
Players and squad numbers last updated on 15 November 2020.
Note: Flags indicate national team as has been defined under FIFA eligibility rules. Players may hold more than one non-FIFA nationality.

No.	Nat.	Position	Name	Date of birth (age)	Signed from
Goalkeepers
1	(Algeria)	GK	Abderrahmane Bouchareb	10 February 1999 (aged 21)	(Algeria) Youth system
16	(Algeria)	GK	Ali Bencherif	26 September 1988 (aged 32)	(Algeria) MO Béjaïa
21	(Algeria)	GK	Nafaa Alloui	17 March 1991 (aged 29)	(Algeria) JSM Béjaïa
Defenders
2	(Algeria)	LB	Abdeldjalil Abdi	22 August 1993 (aged 27)	(Algeria) USM El Harrach
3	(Algeria)	RB	Mohamed Assil Sioued	13 October 1998 (aged 22)	(Algeria) Youth system
4	(Algeria)	CB	Tarek Adouane	25 February 1997 (aged 23)	(Algeria) CRB Ouled Djellal
14	(Algeria)	CB	Mohamed Ikbal Boufligha	28 September 1993 (aged 27)	(Algeria) CR Village Moussa
17	(Algeria)	RB	Bilal Boukarroum	19 December 1993 (aged 27)	(Algeria) JSM Skikda
20	(Algeria)	CB	Nacereddine Khoualed	16 April 1986 (aged 34)	(Algeria) JS Saoura
23	(Algeria)	CB	Adel Lakhdari	12 August 1989 (aged 31)	(Algeria) MC Oran
26	(Algeria)	CB	Hamza Salem	10 January 1998 (aged 22)	(Algeria) Youth system
Midfielders
5	(Algeria)	DM	Chams-Eddine Haddad	13 April 1994 (aged 26)	(Algeria) USM Bel Abbès
6	(Algeria)	DM	Hamza Heriat	6 September 1987 (aged 33)	(Algeria) MC Oran
8	(Algeria)	AM	Lyes Renai	2 February 1997 (aged 23)	(Algeria) JS Kabylie
10	(Algeria)	AM	Mohamed Yacine Athmani	13 May 1991 (aged 29)	(Algeria) CS Constantine
12	(Algeria)		Salaheddine Harrari	9 June 1998 (aged 22)	(Algeria) Paradou AC
13	(Algeria)	AM	Mohamed Raid Ghoul	14 September 1999 (aged 21)	(Algeria) Youth system
18	(Algeria)	DM	Salah Eddine Djabou	15 October 1999 (aged 21)	(Algeria) Youth system
22	(Algeria)	DM	Hatem Dakhia	28 March 1991 (aged 29)	(Algeria) ASO Chlef
24	(Algeria)		Noufel Ghassiri	12 January 1988 (aged 32)	(Algeria) Unattached
25	(Algeria)	AM	Hachem Bouafia	5 May 1989 (aged 31)	(Algeria) USM Annaba
27	(Algeria)	DM	Hamza Yadroudj	3 December 1992 (aged 28)	(Algeria) JS Saoura
Forwards
7	(Algeria)	ST	Mohamed Toumi	7 September 1994 (aged 26)	(Algeria) JS Saoura
11	(Algeria)	ST	Youcef Chibane	23 September 1988 (aged 32)	(Algeria) CS Constantine
15	(Algeria)	ST	Aimen Djebbar	14 May 1999 (aged 21)	(Algeria) Youth system
19	(Algeria)	RW	Hichem Mokhtar	24 October 1991 (aged 29)	(Algeria) JSM Béjaïa
	(Algeria)	ST	Abdelouahab Merri	4 March 2000 (aged 20)	(Algeria) Youth system

== Pre-season ==
21 October 2020 Friendly	JS Kabylie	1–0	US Biskra	Dar El Beïda
	Benchaira			Stadium: Stade Omar Benrabah

== Competitions ==
=== Overview ===
Competition	Record								Started round	Final position / round	First match	Last match
Competition	G	W	D	L	GF	GA	GD	Win %	Started round	Final position / round	First match	Last match
Ligue 1	0	0	0	0	0	0	+0	—	—N/a	To be confirmed	In progress	In progress
League Cup	0	0	0	0	0	0	+0	—	Round of 16	To be confirmed	In progress	In progress
Total	0	0	0	0	0	0	+0	—				

Updated to match played 7 March 2020
Source: Competitions

== League table ==
Pos	Team	Pld	W	D	L	GF	GA	GD	Pts
12	NA Hussein Dey	38	11	14	13	46	45	+1	47
13	RC Relizane	38	13	12	13	35	49	−14	47 (Note: On May 16, 2021 after the participation of a penalized player Younes Koulkheir with RC Relizane against ES Sétif. RC Relizane Lost the match 3–0 and deducted 4 points.)
14	US Biskra	38	11	13	14	32	46	−14	46
15	WA Tlemcen	38	12	9	17	40	47	−7	45
16	ASO Chlef	38	12	9	17	39	53	−14	45

Updated to match(es) played on 28 August 2021. Source: dzfoot.com
Rules for classification: 1) points; 2) head-to-head points; 3) head-to-head goal difference; 4) goal difference; 5) total goals; 6) fairplay ranking; 7) playoff.

=== Results summary ===
Overall								Home						Away					
Pld	W	D	L	GF	GA	GD	Pts	W	D	L	GF	GA	GD	W	D	L	GF	GA	GD
0	0	0	0	0	0	0	0	0	0	0	0	0	0	0	0	0	0	0	0

Last updated: 7 March 2020.
Source: Competitive matches

=== Results by round ===
Round	1	2	3	4	5	6	7	8	9	10	11	12	13	14	15	16	17	18	19	20	21	22	23	24	25	26	27	28	29	30	31	32	33	34	35	36	37	38
Ground																																						
Result	W	D	D	D	D	D	L	L	L	D	D	L	L	W	L	W	L	L	W	L	D	W	D	W	D	W	L	D	D	W	D	W	L	L	L	W	W	L
Position	5	6	6	8	10	9	13	14	14	15	16	16	18	16	17	16	16	16	16	17	17	13	13	12	12	12	12	12	12	12	12	11	12	13	15	14	14	14

Updated to match(es) played on 24 August 2021. Source: Competitive matches
A = Away; H = Home; W = Win; D = Draw; L = Loss

=== Matches ===
On 22 October 2020, the Algerian Ligue Professionnelle 1 fixtures were announced.

28 November 2020 Round 1	US Biskra	1–0	JSM Skikda	Biskra
15:00	Athmani 72'	Soccerway report		Stadium: Stade du 18 Février; Attendance: 0 (close doors); Referee: Lyés Bekouassa

5 December 2020 Round 2	US Biskra	0–0	NA Hussein Dey	Biskra
14:00		Soccerway report		Stadium: Stade du 18 Février; Attendance: 0 (close doors); Referee: Mohamed Boutaraa

12 December 2020 Round 3	NC Magra	0–0	US Biskra	Magra
14:00		Soccerway report		Stadium: Boucheligue Brothers Stadium; Attendance: 0 (close doors); Referee: Malek Ait Ameur

19 December 2020 Round 4	US Biskra	1–1	Paradou AC	Biskra
14:30	Heriat 51' (pen.)	Soccerway report	Benbouali 81'	Stadium: Stade du 18 Février; Attendance: 0 (close doors); Referee: Abderrezzak Arab

23 December 2020 Round 5	WA Tlemcen	0–0	US Biskra	Tlemcen
15:00		Soccerway report		Stadium: Stade Akid Lotfi; Attendance: 0 (close doors); Referee: Amine Sekhraoui

27 December 2020 Round 6	US Biskra	1–1	JS Kabylie	Biskra
14:30	Chibane 9'	Soccerway report	Boufeligha 22' (o.g.)	Stadium: Stade du 18 Février; Attendance: 0 (close doors); Referee: Bilal Bendjahene

9 January 2021 Round 7	RC Relizane	2–0	US Biskra	Relizane
14:30	Chadli 60'; Barkat 76'	Soccerway report		Stadium: Stade Tahar Zoughari; Attendance: 0 (close doors); Referee: Hamza Bouslimani

15 January 2021 Round 8	US Biskra	0–1	USM Bel Abbès	Biskra
14:00		Soccerway report	Metref 67'	Stadium: Stade du 18 Février; Attendance: 0 (close doors); Referee: Mohamed Saïdi

22 January 2021 Round 9	Olympique de Médéa	1–0	US Biskra	Médéa
14:30	Kemoukh 77'	Soccerway report		Stadium: Stade Imam Lyes; Attendance: 0 (close doors); Referee: Mustapha Ghorbal

26 January 2021 Round 10	US Biskra	1–1	CA Bordj Bou Arreridj	Biskra
14:30	Salem 52'	Soccerway report	Maddour 68' (pen.)	Stadium: Stade du 18 Février; Attendance: 0 (close doors); Referee: Hamza Boucetta

30 January 2021 Round 11	MC Alger	1–1	US Biskra	Algiers
15:00	Diomande 35'	Soccerway report	Boukarroum 88' (pen.)	Stadium: Stade du 5 Juillet; Attendance: 0 (close doors); Referee: Nabil Boukhalfa

6 February 2021 Round 12	US Biskra	0–1	CS Constantine	Biskra
15:00		Soccerway report	Belmessaoud 63'	Stadium: Stade du 18 Février; Attendance: 0 (close doors); Referee: Amine Sekhraoui

12 February 2021 Round 13	MC Oran	6–0	US Biskra	Oran
15:00	Hamidi 32'; Guenina 48'; Benamar 50'; Motrani 71'; Bentiba 85'; Belloumi 90+1'	Soccerway report		Stadium: Ahmed Zabana Stadium; Attendance: 0 (close doors); Referee: Hamza Bouslimani

19 February 2021 Round 14	US Biskra	1–0	USM Alger	Biskra
14:30	Salem 52'	Soccerway report		Stadium: Stade du 18 Février; Attendance: 0 (close doors); Referee: Abdelmoumen Touabti

26 February 2021 Round 15	JS Saoura	4–0	US Biskra	Béchar
15:00	Daoud 25'; Messaoudi 45', 53'; Lahmeri 73' (pen.)	Soccerway report		Stadium: Stade 20 Août 1955; Attendance: 0 (close doors); Referee: Mustapha Bessiri

5 March 2021 Round 16	US Biskra	1–0	ES Sétif	Biskra
15:00	Harrari 86'	Soccerway report		Stadium: Stade du 18 Février; Attendance: 0 (close doors); Referee: Farouk Mial

13 March 2021 Round 17	AS Ain M'lila	2–1	US Biskra	Aïn M'lila
15:00	Hamia 63'; Dahar 89'	Soccerway report	Adouane 33'	Stadium: Touhami Zoubir Khelifi Stadium; Attendance: 0 (close doors); Referee: Ahmed Bouzrar

17 March 2021 Round 18	ASO Chlef	1–0	US Biskra	Chlef
15:00	Merili 30'	Soccerway report		Stadium: Stade Mohamed Boumezrag; Attendance: 0 (close doors); Referee: Nabil Boukhalfa

21 March 2021 Round 19	US Biskra	1–0	CR Belouizdad	Biskra
15:00	Yadroudj 52' (pen.)	Soccerway report		Stadium: Stade du 18 Février; Attendance: 0 (close doors); Referee: Mehdi Abid Charef

4 May 2021 Round 20	JSM Skikda	2–1	US Biskra	Skikda
16:00	Kaibou 18'; Bouda 61'	Soccerway report	Chibane 10'	Stadium: Stade 20 Août 1955; Attendance: 0 (close doors); Referee: Abdelali Ibrir

16 May 2021 Round 21	NA Hussein Dey	1–1	US Biskra	Belouizdad
17:00	Meftah 17'	Soccerway report	Athmani 47'	Stadium: Stade 20 Août 1955; Attendance: 0 (close doors); Referee: Ali Nader

22 May 2021 Round 22	US Biskra	1–0	NC Magra	Biskra
18:00	Boukarroum 35' (pen.)	Soccerway report		Stadium: Stade du 18 Février; Attendance: 0 (close doors); Referee: Youcef Gamouh

26 May 2021 Round 23	Paradou AC	1–1	US Biskra	Dar El Beïda
17:00	Kadri 44'	Soccerway report	Yadroudj 14' (pen.)	Stadium: Omar Benrabah Stadium; Attendance: 0 (close doors); Referee: Youcef Taieb Bouderbal

30 May 2021 Round 24	US Biskra	2–0	WA Tlemcen	Biskra
18:00	Boukarroum 5' (pen.); Chibane 16'	Soccerway report		Stadium: Stade du 18 Février; Attendance: 0 (close doors); Referee: Lotfi Bekouassa

13 June 2021 Round 25	JS Kabylie	1–1	US Biskra	Tizi Ouzou
19:00	Hamroune 63'	Soccerway report	Mokhtar 16'	Stadium: Stade 1er Novembre 1954; Attendance: 0 (close doors); Referee: Abdelmoumen Touabti

19 June 2021 Round 26	US Biskra	3–1	RC Relizane	Biskra
20:00	Harrari 14', 19'; Chibane 56'	Soccerway report	Feham 24' (pen.); Hellal 90+1'	Stadium: Stade du 18 Février; Attendance: 0 (close doors); Referee: Redouane Necib

26 June 2021 Round 27	USM Bel Abbès	1–0	US Biskra	Sidi Bel Abbès
17:00	Sailaa 79'	Soccerway report		Stadium: Stade 24 Fevrier 1956; Attendance: 0 (close doors); Referee: Malek Ait Ameur

1 July 2021 Round 28	US Biskra	2–2	Olympique de Médéa	Biskra
18:00	Boukarroum 5' (pen.); Toumi 78'	Soccerway report	Rebiai 23'; Nâas Araba 70'	Stadium: Stade du 18 Février; Attendance: 0 (close doors); Referee: Ali Nader

4 July 2021 Round 29	CA Bordj Bou Arreridj	0–0	US Biskra	Bordj Bou Arréridj
19:00		Soccerway report		Stadium: Stade 20 Août 1955; Attendance: 0 (close doors); Referee: Mohamed Amine Benzohra

8 July 2021 Round 30	US Biskra	2–1	MC Alger	Biskra
20:30	Chibane 54'; Toumi 83'	Soccerway report	Lamara 90' (pen.)	Stadium: Stade du 18 Février; Attendance: 0 (close doors); Referee: Mohamed Boutaraa

13 July 2021 Round 31	CS Constantine	1–1	US Biskra	Constantine
18:00	Amrane 41'	Soccerway report	Harrari 90+5'	Stadium: Stade Ramdane Benabdelmalek; Attendance: 0 (close doors); Referee: Malek Ait Ameur

17 July 2021 Round 32	US Biskra	1–0	MC Oran	Biskra
20:30	Mokhtar 88' (pen.)	Soccerway report		Stadium: Stade du 18 Février; Attendance: 0 (close doors); Referee: Lotfi Bekouassa

23 July 2021 Round 33	USM Alger	2–1	US Biskra	Bologhine
20:30	Naidji 65', 84'	Soccerway report	Mokhtar 25'	Stadium: Omar Hamadi Stadium; Attendance: 0 (close doors); Referee: Mehdi Abid Charef

27 July 2021 Round 34	US Biskra	1–2	JS Saoura	Biskra
21:00	Ghassiri 32'	Soccerway report	Lahmeri 42'; Messaoudi 82' (pen.)	Stadium: Stade du 18 Février; Attendance: 0 (close doors); Referee: Mustapha Ghorbal

9 August 2021 Round 35	ES Sétif	4–0	US Biskra	Sétif
21:00	Djahnit 11' (pen.); Djabou 32', 69'; Lomotey 90'	Soccerway report		Stadium: Stade 8 Mai 1945; Attendance: 0 (close doors); Referee: Redouane Necib

16 August 2021 Round 36	US Biskra	1–0	AS Aïn M'lila	Biskra
21:00	Athmani 81'	Soccerway report		Stadium: Stade du 18 Février; Attendance: 0 (close doors); Referee: Lyés Bekouassa

21 August 2021 Round 37	US Biskra	2–0	ASO Chlef	Biskra
21:00	Chibane 29'; Mokhtar 38'	Soccerway report		Stadium: Stade du 18 Février; Attendance: 0 (close doors); Referee: Mehdi Abid Charef

24 August 2021 Round 38	CR Belouizdad	4–2	US Biskra	Belouizdad
17:30	Sayoud 14', 24'; Bousseliou 67'; Merzougui 83'	Soccerway report	Boukarroum 59' (pen.); Athmani 90+4'	Stadium: Stade 20 Août 1955; Attendance: 0 (close doors); Referee: Ali Nader

== Algerian League Cup ==
30 April 2021 Round of 16	US Biskra	0–0 (a.e.t.) (5–4 p)	Paradou AC	Biskra
15:30				Stadium: Stade du 18 Février; Attendance: 0 (close doors); Referee: Abdelmoumen Touabti
	Penalties
	Boukaroum (penalty scored); Dakhia (penalty scored); Renaï (penalty scored); Lakhdari (penalty scored); Khoualed (penalty scored)		(penalty missed) Zorgane; (penalty scored) Messibah; (penalty scored) Kadri; (penalty scored) Mouali; (penalty scored) Bouabta
Note: Lineup for US Biskra - Aloui, Adouane (Boukaroum, 68'), Salem, Khoualed, Abdi, Lakhdari, Bouafia, Athmani (Dakhia, 46'), Mokhtar, Chibane, Ghassiri (Renaï, 68').

4 June 2021 Quarter-finals	US Biskra	0–2	JS Kabylie	Biskra
17:45		Report	Tubal 20'; Hamroune 69' (pen.)	Stadium: Stade du 18 Février; Attendance: 0 (close doors); Referee: Nabil Boukhalfa

== Squad information ==
=== Playing statistics ===
No.	Pos	Nat	Player	Total		Ligue 1		League Cup	
No.	Pos	Nat	Player	Apps	Goals	Apps	Goals	Apps	Goals
Goalkeepers
1	GK	(Algeria) ALG	Abderrahmane Bouchareb	0	0	0	0	0	0
16	GK	(Algeria) ALG	Ali Bencherif	0	0	0	0	0	0
21	GK	(Algeria) ALG	Nafaa Alloui	2	0	0	0	2	0
Defenders
2	DF	(Algeria) ALG	Abdeldjalil Abdi	1	0	0	0	1	0
3	DF	(Algeria) ALG	Mohamed Assil Sioued	0	0	0	0	0	0
4	DF	(Algeria) ALG	Tarek Adouane	1	0	0	0	1	0
14	DF	(Algeria) ALG	Mohamed Ikbal Boufligha	0	0	0	0	0	0
17	DF	(Algeria) ALG	Bilal Boukarroum	2	0	0	0	2	0
20	DF	(Algeria) ALG	Nacereddine Khoualed	2	0	0	0	2	0
23	DF	(Algeria) ALG	Adel Lakhdari	2	0	0	0	2	0
26	DF	(Algeria) ALG	Hamza Salem	2	0	0	0	2	0
Midfielders
5	MF	(Algeria) ALG	Chams-Eddine Haddad	1	0	0	0	1	0
6	MF	(Algeria) ALG	Hamza Heriat	0	0	0	0	0	0
8	MF	(Algeria) ALG	Anis Renaï	1	0	0	0	1	0
10	MF	(Algeria) ALG	Mohamed Yacine Athmani	2	0	0	0	2	0
12	MF	(Algeria) ALG	Salaheddine Harrari	1	0	0	0	1	0
13	MF	(Algeria) ALG	Mohamed Raid Ghoul	0	0	0	0	0	0
18	MF	(Algeria) ALG	Salah Eddine Djabou	1	0	0	0	1	0
22	MF	(Algeria) ALG	Hatem Dakhia	2	0	0	0	2	0
24	MF	(Algeria) ALG	Noufel Ghassiri	2	0	0	0	2	0
25	MF	(Algeria) ALG	Hachem Bouafia	2	0	0	0	2	0
27	MF	(Algeria) ALG	Hamza Yadroudj	1	0	0	0	1	0
Forwards
7	FW	(Algeria) ALG	Mohamed Toumi	0	0	0	0	0	0
11	FW	(Algeria) ALG	Youcef Chibane	2	0	0	0	2	0
15	FW	(Algeria) ALG	Aimen Djebbar	1	0	0	0	1	0
19	FW	(Algeria) ALG	Hichem Mokhtar	2	0	0	0	2	0
	FW	(Algeria) ALG	Abdelouahab Merri	0	0	0	0	0	0
Players transferred out during the season

Last updated: 13 June 2020
Source: fr.soccerway.com

=== Goalscorers ===
Includes all competitive matches. The list is sorted alphabetically by surname when total goals are equal.

== Transfers ==
=== In ===
Date	Pos	Player	From club	Transfer fee	Source
23 September 2020	DF	(Algeria) Nacereddine Khoualed	JS Saoura	Free transfer	
23 September 2020	GK	(Algeria) Nafaâ Aloui	JSM Béjaïa	Free transfer	
25 September 2020	MF	(Algeria) Hamza Heriat	MC Oran	Free transfer	
1 October 2020	MF	(Algeria) Ziri Hammar	JS Saoura	Free transfer	
6 October 2020	MF	(Algeria) Amar Chemseddine Haddad	USM Bel Abbès	Free transfer	
14 October 2020	FW	(Algeria) Youcef Chibane	CS Constantine	Free transfer	
