= 2022–23 US Biskra season =

US Biskra
2022–23 season
- President: Abdelkader Triaa
- Head coach: Cherif Hadjar (from 29 July 2022) (until 3 October 2022); Youcef Bouzidi (from 9 October 2022) (until 17 December 2022); Mohamed Boutadjine (from 17 December 2022)
- Stadium: 18 February Stadium
- Ligue 1: 12th
- Algerian Cup: Round of 64
- Top goalscorer: League: Mohamed El Siddik Baali (6 goals); All: Mohamed El Siddik Baali; Cherif Siam (6 goals)
- Biggest win: US Biskra 3–0 HB Chelghoum Laïd
- Biggest defeat: ES Sétif 3–1 US Biskra

The 2022–23 season, was US Biskra's 6th season and the club's 4th consecutive season in the top flight of Algerian football. In addition to the domestic league, US Biskra participated in the Algerian Cup.

== Squad list ==
Players and squad numbers last updated on 5 February 2023.
Note: Flags indicate national team as has been defined under FIFA eligibility rules. Players may hold more than one non-FIFA nationality.

No.	Nat.	Position	Name	Date of birth (age)	Signed from
Goalkeepers
1	(Algeria)	GK	Abderrahmane Bouchareb	10 February 1999 (aged 23)	(Algeria) Youth system
13	(Algeria)	GK	Walid Ouabdi	12 June 1995 (aged 27)	(Algeria) SC Aïn Defla
16	(Algeria)	GK	Ali Bencherif	26 September 1988 (aged 34)	(Algeria) MO Béjaïa
Defenders
2	(Algeria)	CB	Ahmed Redha Houhou	15 January 2000 (aged 22)	(Algeria) Youth system
4	(Algeria)	CB	Tarek Adouane	25 February 1997 (aged 25)	(Algeria) CRB Ouled Djellal
7	(Algeria)	RB	Merouane Boussalem	11 February 1996 (aged 26)	(Algeria) NA Hussein Dey
14	(Algeria)	CB	Mohamed Ikbal Boufligha	28 September 1993 (aged 29)	(Algeria) CR Village Moussa
15	(Algeria)	LB	Abdelhak Belkacemi	27 July 1992 (aged 30)	(Algeria) HB Chelghoum Laïd
17	(Algeria)	RB	Bilal Boukarroum	19 December 1993 (aged 29)	(Algeria) JSM Skikda
20	(Algeria)	CB	Nacereddine Khoualed	16 April 1986 (aged 36)	(Algeria) JS Saoura
23	(Algeria)	CB	Adel Lakhdari	12 August 1989 (aged 33)	(Algeria) MC Oran
Midfielders
5	(Algeria)	MF	Ali Amriche	8 December 1998 (aged 24)	(Algeria) CA Bordj Bou Arreridj
8	(Algeria)	MF	Mustapha Zeghnoun	30 June 1991 (aged 31)	(Algeria) ASO Chlef
10	(Algeria)	MF	Hamza Ounnas	18 December 1988 (aged 34)	(Algeria) USM Bel Abbès
12	(Algeria)	MF	Hatem Dakhia	28 March 1991 (aged 31)	(Algeria) ASO Chlef
18	(Algeria)	MF	Mohamed Fenniri	20 January 1998 (aged 24)	(Algeria) Paradou AC
21	(Algeria)	MF	Yacine Medane	28 February 1993 (aged 29)	(Algeria) JS Kabylie
24	(Algeria)	MF	Noufel Ghassiri	12 January 1988 (aged 34)	(Algeria) Unattached
27	(Algeria)	MF	Hamza Yadroudj	3 December 1992 (aged 30)	(Algeria) JS Saoura
Forwards
9	(Algeria)	FW	Mohamed Larbi Khoualed	3 December 1989 (aged 33)	(Algeria) CRB Ouled Djellal
11	(Algeria)	FW	Chérif Siam	May 1, 1995 (aged 27)	(Algeria) MC Oran
19	(Algeria)	FW	Lamine Abid	4 July 1991 (aged 31)	(Algeria) HB Chelghoum Laïd
22	(Algeria)	FW	Abdelouahab Merri	4 March 2000 (aged 22)	(Algeria) Youth system
25	(Algeria)	FW	Mohamed El Siddik Baâli	22 January 1995 (aged 27)	(Algeria) Olympique de Médéa
26	(Algeria)	FW	Mourad Bouraada	4 April 1998 (aged 24)	(Algeria) RC Kouba

== Transfers ==
=== In ===
==== Summer ====
Date	Pos	Player	From club	Transfer fee	Source
26 July 2022	RB	(Algeria) Merouane Boussalem	NA Hussein Dey	Free transfer	
28 July 2022	FW	(Algeria) Lamine Abid	Unattached	Free transfer	
28 July 2022	FW	(Algeria) Cherif Siam	MC Oran	Free transfer	
30 July 2022	MF	(Algeria) Ahmed Gagaa	Olympique de Médéa	Free transfer	
1 August 2022	FW	(Algeria) Mourad Bouraada	RC Kouba	Free transfer	
19 August 2022	LB	(Algeria) Abdelhak Belkacemi	HB Chelghoum Laïd	Free transfer	

=== Out ===
==== Summer ====
Date	Pos	Player	To club	Transfer fee	Source
19 June 2022	FW	(Algeria) Hichem Mokhtar	(Saudi Arabia) Al-Najma SC	Free transfer	
17 August 2022	CB	(Algeria) Hamza Salem	ES Sétif	Free transfer	

==== Winter ====
Date	Pos	Player	To club	Transfer fee	Source
27 January 2023	MF	(Algeria) Ahmed Gagaa	Unattached	Released	
2 February 2023	MF	(Algeria) Mohamed El Amine Nabi	Unattached	Released	

== Competitions ==
=== Overview ===
Competition	Record								Started round	Final position / round	First match	Last match
Competition	G	W	D	L	GF	GA	GD	Win %	Started round	Final position / round	First match	Last match
Ligue 1	30	10	10	10	30	29	+1	33.33	—N/a	12th	27 August 2022	15 July 2023
Algerian Cup	1	0	0	1	2	3	−1	0.00	Round of 64	Round of 64	25 November 2022	25 November 2022
Total	31	10	10	11	32	32	+0	32.26				

Updated to match played 15 July 2023
Source: Competitions

=== Ligue 1 ===
==== League table ====
Pos	Team	Pld	W	D	L	GF	GA	GD	Pts	Qualification or relegation
10	MC Oran	30	11	8	11	27	34	−7	41	
11	USM Alger	30	11	7	12	31	30	+1	40	Qualification for CAF Confederation Cup (Note: USMA Alger qualified for the 2023–24 CAF Confederation Cup as the title holders.)
12	US Biskra	30	10	10	10	30	29	+1	40	
13	NC Magra	30	11	7	12	35	36	−1	40	
14	JS Kabylie	30	10	9	11	35	26	+9	39	

Updated to match(es) played on 15 July 2023. Source: the-sports.org
Rules for classification: 1) points; 2) head-to-head points; 3) head-to-head goal difference; 4) goal difference; 5) total goals; 6) fairplay ranking; 7) playoff.

==== Results summary ====
Overall								Home						Away					
Pld	W	D	L	GF	GA	GD	Pts	W	D	L	GF	GA	GD	W	D	L	GF	GA	GD
30	10	10	10	30	29	+1	40	9	6	0	21	9	+12	1	4	10	9	20	−11

Last updated: 15 July 2023.
Source: Competitive matches

==== Results by round ====
Round	1	2	3	4	5	6	7	8	9	10	11	12	13	14	15	16	17	18	19	20	21	22	23	24	25	26	27	28	29	30
Ground	H	A	H	H	A	H	A	H	A	H	A	H	A	H	A	A	H	A	A	H	A	H	A	H	A	H	A	H	A	H
Result	D	D	D	W	L	D	D	W	L	W	L	D	W	W	L	L	D	D	D	W	L	D	L	W	L	W	L	W	L	W
Position	9	10	10	7	9	9	11	8	11	9	9	10	9	7	9	9	11	10	11	9	10	11	12	11	12	10	11	10	13	12

Updated to match(es) played on 15 July 2023. Source: Competitive matches
A = Away; H = Home; W = Win; D = Draw; L = Loss

==== Matches ====
The league fixtures were announced on 19 July 2022.

27 August 2022 Round 1	US Biskra	2–2	ES Sétif	Biskra
20:00	Baâli 37'; Siam 47'	Report	Kendouci 1', 84'	Stadium: 18 February Stadium; Referee: Nabil Boukhalfa

3 September 2022 Round 2	MC Alger	0–0	US Biskra	Rouïba
16:45		Report		Stadium: Salem Mabrouki Stadium; Referee: Mohamed Lamine Benzohra

10 September 2022 Round 3	US Biskra	0–0	JS Saoura	Biskra
20:00		Report		Stadium: 18 February Stadium; Referee: Amine Hansal

16 September 2022 Round 4	US Biskra	1–0	MC El Bayadh	Biskra
20:00	Abid 78'	Report		Stadium: 18 February Stadium; Referee: Akram Mechairia

24 September 2022 Round 5	RC Arbaâ	2–0	US Biskra	Larbaâ
16:00	Taib 8'; Zaouche 10'	Report		Stadium: Ismaïl Makhlouf Stadium; Referee: Houssem Benyahia

30 September 2022 Round 6	US Biskra	1–1	NC Magra	Biskra
19:00	Baâli 90+2'	Report	Banouh 61'	Stadium: 18 February Stadium; Referee: Billel Soltani

14 October 2022 Round 8	US Biskra	2–0	ASO Chlef	Biskra
18:00	Lakhdari 17'; Boukarroum 25' (pen.)	Report		Stadium: 18 February Stadium; Referee: Hamza Bouslimani

21 October 2022 Round 9	CS Constantine	2–1	US Biskra	Constantine
15:00	Koukpo 15'; Abdelhafid 47'	Report	Zeghnoun 18'	Stadium: Ramadane Ben Abdelmalek Stadium; Referee: Lyes Bekouassa

10 November 2022 Round 11	USM Khenchela	1–0	US Biskra	Khenchela
15:00	Kaddour 90+1'	Report		Stadium: Amar Hamam Stadium; Referee: Billel Soltani

29 November 2022 Round 12	US Biskra	1–1	JS Kabylie	Biskra
15:00	Siam 5'	Report	Mouaki 15'	Stadium: 18 February Stadium; Referee: Youcef Tayeb Bouderbali

7 December 2022 Round 13	HB Chelghoum Laïd	0–1	US Biskra	Chelghoum Laïd
15:00		Report	Abid 61'	Stadium: 11 December 1961 Stadium; Referee: Mohamed Amine Benzohra

11 December 2022 Round 14	US Biskra	2–1	Paradou AC	Biskra
15:00	Siam 6'; Abid 65' (pen.)	Report	Messiad 24'	Stadium: 18 February Stadium; Referee: Bilal Bendjahene

20 December 2022 Round 7	CR Belouizdad	1–1	US Biskra	Belouizdad
15:00	Belkhir 62'	Report	Boukarroum 86' (pen.)	Stadium: 20 August 1955 Stadium; Referee: Mohamed Bouteraa

24 December 2022 Round 15	MC Oran	1–0	US Biskra	Oran
15:00	Ezzemani 81' (pen.)	Report		Stadium: Ahmed Zabana Stadium; Referee: Anes Azrine

28 December 2022 Round 10	US Biskra	1–0	USM Alger	Biskra
17:00	Boussalem 3'	Report		Stadium: 18 February Stadium; Referee: Abdellah Benchehida

10 February 2023 Round 16	ES Sétif	3–1	US Biskra	Sétif
17:00	Zamoum 25'; Guenaoui 50'; Salem 56'	Report	Bouraada 85'	Stadium: 8 May 1945 Stadium; Referee: Youcef Gamouh

19 February 2023 Round 17	US Biskra	0–0	MC Alger	Biskra
18:00		Report		Stadium: 18 February Stadium; Referee: Abdelmoumen Touabti

25 February 2023 Round 18	JS Saoura	1–1	US Biskra	Béchar
18:00	Doucene 21'	Report	Siam 46'	Stadium: 20 August 1955 Stadium; Referee: Redouane Allou

10 March 2023 Round 19	MC El Bayadh	1–1	US Biskra	El Bayadh
15:00	Benzid 45+1'	Report	Abid 90' (pen.)	Stadium: Zakaria Medjdoub Stadium; Referee: Lyes Bekouassa

17 March 2023 Round 20	US Biskra	1–0	RC Arbaâ	Biskra
15:00	Boussalem 13'	Report		Stadium: 18 February Stadium; Referee: Mohamed Bouteraa

31 March 2023 Round 21	NC Magra	2–1	US Biskra	Magra
15:45	Ladjabi 21'; Djahnit 56'	Report	Baâli 54'	Stadium: Boucheligue Brothers Stadium; Referee: Mohamed Belkbir

9 April 2023 Round 22	US Biskra	1–1	CR Belouizdad	Biskra
22:00	Ounnas 45'	Report	Bourdim 84' (pen.)	Stadium: 18 February Stadium; Referee: Akram Mechairia

18 May 2023 Round 23	ASO Chlef	2–1	US Biskra	Chlef
18:00	Ghodbane 49'; Souibaâh 90+1'	Report	Zeghnoun 78'	Stadium: Mohamed Boumezrag Stadium; Referee: Mohamed Bouteraa

31 May 2023 Round 24	US Biskra	3–2	CS Constantine	Biskra
18:00	Zeghnoun 4'; Boussalem 24', 45'	Report	Benchaira 20'; Dib 90'	Stadium: 18 February Stadium; Referee: Lotfi Bekouassa

7 June 2023 Round 25	USM Alger	1–0	US Biskra	Dar El Beïda
16:30	Belaïd 90'	Report		Stadium: Omar Benrabah Stadium; Referee: Mohamed Saidi

1 July 2023 Round 26	US Biskra	1–0	USM Khenchela	Biskra
17:00	Baâli 42'	Report		Stadium: 18 February Stadium; Referee: Lyes Bekouassa

4 July 2023 Round 27	JS Kabylie	1–0	US Biskra	Tizi Ouzou
17:00	Mouaki 84' (pen.)	Report		Stadium: 1 November 1954 Stadium; Referee: Nadjib Meziani

7 July 2023 Round 28	US Biskra	3–0	HB Chelghoum Laïd	Biskra
17:15	Khoualed 2'; Fenniri 6'; Baâli 51'	Report		Stadium: 18 February Stadium; Referee: Fodil Oukil

10 July 2023 Round 29	Paradou AC	2–1	US Biskra	Dar El Beïda
17:15	Bendouma 42'; Douar 51'	Report	Baâli 55'	Stadium: Omar Benrabah Stadium; Referee: El Hadj Aissa Semmache

15 July 2023 Round 30	US Biskra	2–1	MC Oran	Biskra
17:15	Siam 4'; Dakhia 34'	Report	Benayad 85'	Stadium: 18 February Stadium; Referee: Billel Soltani

=== Algerian Cup ===
25 November 2022 Round of 64	SKAF Khemis Miliana	3–2	US Biskra	Aïn Defla
14:00	Bourerga; Kadri	Report	Yadroudj 26'; Siam 47'	Stadium: Abdelkader Khellal Stadium; Referee: Bilal Bendjahene
Note: US Biskra Lineups: Ouabdi, Boussalem, Derbal, Adouane, Dakhia (Boufligha A, 83'), Yadroudj, Amriche, Zeghnoun, Siam (Merri, 83'), Bouraada, Abid.

== Squad information ==
=== Playing statistics ===
No.	Pos	Nat	Player	Total		Ligue 1		Algerian Cup	
No.	Pos	Nat	Player	Apps	Goals	Apps	Goals	Apps	Goals
Goalkeepers
1	GK	(Algeria) ALG	Abderrahmane Bouchareb	1	0	1	0	0	0
13	GK	(Algeria) ALG	Walid Ouabdi	30	0	29	0	1	0
16	GK	(Algeria) ALG	Ali Bencherif	0	0	0	0	0	0
Defenders
2	DF	(Algeria) ALG	Ahmed Redha Houhou	0	0	0	0	0	0
4	DF	(Algeria) ALG	Tarek Adouane	22	0	21	0	1	0
7	DF	(Algeria) ALG	Merouane Boussalem	30	4	29	4	1	0
14	DF	(Algeria) ALG	Mohamed Ikbal Boufligha	22	0	22	0	0	0
15	DF	(Algeria) ALG	Abdelhak Belkacemi	16	0	16	0	0	0
17	DF	(Algeria) ALG	Bilal Boukarroum	26	2	26	2	0	0
20	DF	(Algeria) ALG	Nacereddine Khoualed	19	1	19	1	0	0
23	DF	(Algeria) ALG	Adel Lakhdari	16	1	16	1	0	0
29	DF	(Algeria) ALG	Ayoub Derbal	7	0	6	0	1	0
Midfielders
5	MF	(Algeria) ALG	Ali Amriche	24	0	23	0	1	0
8	MF	(Algeria) ALG	Mustapha Zeghnoun	26	3	25	3	1	0
10	MF	(Algeria) ALG	Hamza Ounnas	23	1	23	1	0	0
12	MF	(Algeria) ALG	Hatem Dakhia	18	1	17	1	1	0
18	MF	(Algeria) ALG	Mohamed Fenniri	7	1	7	1	0	0
21	MF	(Algeria) ALG	Yacine Medane	22	0	22	0	0	0
24	MF	(Algeria) ALG	Noufel Ghassiri	12	0	12	0	0	0
27	MF	(Algeria) ALG	Hamza Yadroudj	26	1	25	0	1	1
32	MF	(Algeria) ALG	Alaeddine Boufligha	6	0	5	0	1	0
Forwards
9	FW	(Algeria) ALG	Mohamed Larbi Khoualed	4	0	4	0	0	0
11	FW	(Algeria) ALG	Chérif Siam	29	6	28	5	1	1
19	FW	(Algeria) ALG	Lamine Abid	20	4	19	4	1	0
22	FW	(Algeria) ALG	Abdelouahab Merri	4	0	3	0	1	0
25	FW	(Algeria) ALG	Mohamed El Siddik Baâli	28	6	28	6	0	0
26	FW	(Algeria) ALG	Mourad Bouraada	18	1	17	1	1	0
28	FW	(Algeria) ALG	Nizar Tamer	3	0	2	0	1	0
Players transferred out during the season
6	MF	(Algeria) ALG	Ahmed Gagaa	5	0	5	0	0	0
3	FW	(Algeria) ALG	Mohamed El Amine Nabi	0	0	0	0	0	0

Last updated: 15 July 2023
Source: soccerway.com

=== Goalscorers ===
As of 15 July 2023

Includes all competitive matches. The list is sorted alphabetically by surname when total goals are equal.

No.	Nat.	Player	Pos.	L 1	AC	TOTAL
25	(Algeria)	Mohamed El Siddik Baali	FW	6	0	6
11	(Algeria)	Cherif Siam	FW	5	1	6
19	(Algeria)	Lamine Abid	FW	4	0	4
7	(Algeria)	Merouane Boussalem	DF	4	0	4
8	(Algeria)	Mustapha Zeghnoun	MF	3	0	3
17	(Algeria)	Bilal Boukarroum	DF	2	0	2
23	(Algeria)	Adel Lakhdari	DF	1	0	1
27	(Algeria)	Hamza Yadroudj	MF	0	1	1
26	(Algeria)	Mourad Bouraada	FW	1	0	1
10	(Algeria)	Hamza Ounnas	MF	1	0	1
20	(Algeria)	Nacereddine Khoualed	DF	1	0	1
18	(Algeria)	Mohamed Fenniri	MF	1	0	1
12	(Algeria)	Hatem Dakhia	MF	1	0	1
Own Goals				0	0	0
Totals				30	2	32
