= 2023–24 US Biskra season =

US Biskra
2023–24 season
- President: Abdelkader Triaa
- Head coach: Mounir Zeghdoud (from 13 August 2023)
- Stadium: 18 February Stadium
- Ligue 1: 14th
- Algerian Cup: Quarter-final
- Top goalscorer: League: Mustapha Zeghnoun (4 goals); All: Mustapha Zeghnoun (4 goals)
- Biggest win: US Biskra 3–0 AS Bordj Ghédir
- Biggest defeat: US Biskra 0–5 Paradou AC
Home colours	Away colours	Third colours

The 2023–24 season, is US Biskra's 7th season and the club's 5th consecutive season in the top flight of Algerian football. In addition to the domestic league, US Biskra are participating in the Algerian Cup.

== Squad list ==
Players and squad numbers last updated on 31 January 2024.
Note: Flags indicate national team as has been defined under FIFA eligibility rules. Players may hold more than one non-FIFA nationality.

No.	Nat.	Position	Name	Date of birth (age)	Signed from
Goalkeepers
1	(Algeria)	GK	Ahmed Abdelkader	19 February 1999 (aged 24)	(Algeria) CR Belouizdad
13	(Algeria)	GK	Abderrahmane Amri	21 April 1997 (aged 26)	(Algeria) MO Constantine
30	(Algeria)	GK	Oussama Mellala	16 September 2003 (aged 19)	(Algeria) USM Annaba
Defenders
2	(Algeria)	CB	Ahmed Redha Houhou	15 January 2000 (aged 23)	(Algeria) Youth system
4	(Algeria)	CB	Tarek Adouane	25 February 1997 (aged 26)	(Algeria) CRB Ouled Djellal
6	(Algeria)	CB	Hamza Salem	10 January 1998 (aged 25)	(Algeria) ES Sétif
15	(Algeria)	LB	Abdelhak Belkacemi	27 July 1992 (aged 31)	(Algeria) HB Chelghoum Laïd
17	(Algeria)	RB	Bilal Boukarroum	19 December 1993 (aged 29)	(Algeria) JSM Skikda
20	(Algeria)	CB	Nacereddine Khoualed	16 April 1986 (aged 37)	(Algeria) JS Saoura
23	(Algeria)	CB	Adel Lakhdari	12 August 1989 (aged 34)	(Algeria) MC Oran
24	(Algeria)	LB	Salaheddine Benlaribi	30 April 1995 (aged 28)	(Algeria) RC Arbaâ
27	(Algeria)	RB	Aymen Chehmat	19 September 2000 (aged 22)	(Algeria) JS Djijel
Midfielders
8	(Algeria)	MF	Mustapha Zeghnoun	30 June 1991 (aged 32)	(Algeria) ASO Chlef
10	(Algeria)	MF	Hamza Ounnas	18 December 1988 (aged 34)	(Algeria) USM Bel Abbès
12	(Algeria)	MF	Hatem Dakhia	28 March 1991 (aged 32)	(Algeria) ASO Chlef
14	(Algeria)	MF	Tayeb Hamoudi	10 February 1995 (aged 28)	(Algeria) MC Alger
19	(Algeria)	MF	Ayoub Derbal	12 June 2001 (aged 22)	(Algeria) Youth system
21	(Algeria)	MF	Yacine Medane	28 February 1993 (aged 30)	(Algeria) JS Kabylie
22	(Algeria)	MF	Abdellah Daouadji	9 July 1995 (aged 28)	(Algeria) ASM Oran
26	(Algeria)	MF	Nizar Tamer	31 July 2001 (aged 22)	(Algeria) Youth system
Forwards
7	(Algeria)	FW	Mourad Bouraada	4 April 1998 (aged 25)	(Algeria) RC Kouba
9	(Algeria)	FW	Mohamed Larbi Khoualed	3 December 1989 (aged 33)	(Algeria) CRB Ouled Djellal
11	(Algeria)	FW	Chérif Siam	May 1, 1995 (aged 28)	(Algeria) MC Oran
18	(Algeria)	FW	Khalil Darfalou	21 June 2001 (aged 22)	(Algeria) USM Alger
25	(Algeria)	FW	Mohamed El Siddik Baâli	22 January 1995 (aged 28)	(Algeria) Olympique de Médéa

== Transfers ==
=== In ===
==== Summer ====
Date	Pos	Player	Moving from	Fee	Source
13 August 2023	GK	(Algeria) Saber Meddour	NC Magra	Free transfer	
13 August 2023	GK	(Algeria) Abderrahmane Amri	MO Constantine	Free transfer	
13 August 2023	DF	(Algeria) Aymen Chehmat	JS Djijel	Free transfer	
13 August 2023	DF	(Algeria) Salaheddine Benlaribi	RC Arbaâ	Free transfer	
16 August 2023	FW	(Algeria) Khalil Darfalou	USM Alger	Free transfer	
19 August 2023	DF	(Algeria) Hamza Salem	ES Sétif	Free transfer	
20 August 2023	FW	(Algeria) Billel Bensaha	(Saudi Arabia) Al-Sharq	Free transfer	
21 August 2023	GK	(Algeria) Oussama Mellala	USM Annaba	Free transfer	
24 August 2023	GK	(Algeria) Yacine Sidi Salah	JS Kabylie	Free transfer	
9 September 2023	MF	(Algeria) Tayeb Hamoudi	MC Alger	Free transfer	
10 September 2023	GK	(Algeria) Ahmed Abdelkader	CR Belouizdad	Free transfer	
10 September 2023	MF	(Algeria) Abdellah Daouadji	ASM Oran	Free transfer	

=== Out ===
==== Summer ====
Date	Pos	Player	Moving to	Fee	Source
23 July 2023	GK	(Algeria) Walid Ouabdi	JS Saoura	Free transfer	
13 August 2023	DF	(Algeria) Mohamed Ikbal Boufligha	Free agent	Free transfer (Released)	
14 August 2023	MF	(Algeria) Ali Amriche	JS Kabylie	Free transfer	
21 August 2023	FW	(Algeria) Lamine Abid	Hetten FC	Free transfer	
1 September 2023	FW	(Algeria) Billel Bensaha	(Oman) Al-Nahda	Free transfer	
1 September 2023	GK	(Algeria) Yacine Sidi Salah	Free agent	Free transfer (Released)	
10 September 2023	FW	(Algeria) Abdelouahab Merri	Free agent	Free transfer (Released)	

==== Winter ====
Date	Pos	Player	Moving to	Fee	Source
31 January 2024	FW	(Algeria) Merouane Boussalem	MC Oran	Free transfer	
5 February 2024	GK	(Algeria) Saber Meddour	USM Annaba	Free transfer	

=== New contracts ===
No.	Pos	Player	Contract length	Contract end	Date	Source
10	MF	Hamza Ounnas	2 years	2025	16 August 2023	
8	MF	Mustapha Zeghnoun	2 years	2025	16 August 2023	

== Competitions ==
=== Overview ===
Competition	Record								Started round	Final position / round	First match	Last match
Competition	G	W	D	L	GF	GA	GD	Win %	Started round	Final position / round	First match	Last match
Ligue 1	30	9	9	12	25	34	−9	30.00	—N/a	14th	17 September 2023	14 June 2024
Algerian Cup	4	2	1	1	7	5	+2	50.00	Round of 64	Quarter-finals	3 February 2024	16 April 2024
Total	34	11	10	13	32	39	−7	32.35				

Updated to match played 14 June 2024
Source: Competitions

=== Ligue 1 ===
==== League table ====
Pos	Team	Pld	W	D	L	GF	GA	GD	Pts	Qualification or relegation
12	NC Magra	30	9	11	10	30	32	−2	38	
13	MC Oran	30	9	9	12	26	33	−7	36	
14	US Biskra	30	9	9	12	25	34	−9	36	
15	ES Ben Aknoun (R)	30	8	8	14	32	37	−5	32 (Note: ES Ben Aknoun awarded 3–0 win against US Souf.)	Relegation to Algerian Ligue 2
16	US Souf (R)	30	2	1	27	22	86	−64	7 (Note: US Souf lost 3–0 win against ES Ben Aknoun by penalty.)	Relegation to Algerian Ligue 2

Source: the-sports.org
Rules for classification: 1) points; 2) head-to-head points; 3) head-to-head goal difference; 4) goal difference; 5) total goals; 6) fairplay ranking; 7) playoff.
(R) Relegated

==== Results summary ====
Overall								Home						Away					
Pld	W	D	L	GF	GA	GD	Pts	W	D	L	GF	GA	GD	W	D	L	GF	GA	GD
30	9	9	12	25	34	−9	36	7	5	3	15	13	+2	2	4	9	10	21	−11

Last updated: 14 June 2024.
Source: Competitive matches

==== Results by round ====
Round	1	2	3	4	5	6	7	8	9	10	11	12	13	14	15	16	17	18	19	20	21	22	23	24	25	26	27	28	29	30
Ground	A	H	A	H	A	H	A	H	A	A	H	A	H	A	H	H	A	H	A	H	A	H	A	H	H	A	H	A	H	A
Result	L	W	L	L	W	W	D	D	D	W	D	D	D	L	W	W	L	L	D	W	L	W	L	D	D	L	L	L	W	L
Position	12	8	10	15	13	10	10	11	12	8	8	10	11	11	11	8	10	10	10	9	10	7	9	9	9	11	12	14	13	14

Updated to match(es) played on 14 June 2024. Source: Competitive matches
A = Away; H = Home; W = Win; D = Draw; L = Loss

==== Matches ====
The league fixtures were announced on 24 August 2023.

All times are local, WAT (UTC+1).

Win Draw Loss Postponed

17 September 2023 Round 1	JS Saoura	1–0	US Biskra	Béchar
20:00	Bellatreche 31' (pen.)	Report		Stadium: 20 August 1955 Stadium; Referee: Billel Soltani

23 September 2023 Round 2	US Biskra	3–1	US Souf	Biskra
19:00	Rahmoun 10'; Baâli 12'; Zeghnoun 32'	Report	Bassou 13'	Stadium: 18 February Stadium; Referee: Akram Mechairia

29 September 2023 Round 3	NC Magra	2–1	US Biskra	Magra
15:45	Dadache 61' (pen.); Saidi 83'	Report	Baâli 27'	Stadium: Boucheligue Brothers Stadium; Referee: Redouane Allou

6 October 2023 Round 4	US Biskra	0–5	Paradou AC	Biskra
19:00		Report	Ait Abdessalem 7'; Titraoui 11', 60'; Bouzida 38'; Kohili 86'	Stadium: 18 February Stadium; Referee: Mustapha Ghorbal

11 November 2023 Round 5	USM Khenchela	0–1	US Biskra	Khenchela
15:00		Report	Khoualed 90+4'	Stadium: Amar Hamam Stadium; Referee: Mohamed Belkebir

18 November 2023 Round 6	US Biskra	1–0	USM Alger	Biskra
18:00	Zeghnoun 14'	Report		Stadium: 18 February Stadium; Referee: Billel Bendjahene

25 November 2023 Round 7	JS Kabylie	1–1	US Biskra	Tizi Ouzou
16:45	Adouane 43' (o.g.)	Report	Tamer 24'	Stadium: 1 November 1954 Stadium; Referee: Youcef Taieb Bouderbal

9 December 2023 Round 9	ES Sétif	2–2	US Biskra	Sétif
18:00	Coulibaly 55'; Zamoum 70'	Report	Zeghnoun 12'; Baâli 28'	Stadium: 8 May 1945 Stadium; Referee: Mohamed Lamine Chaoubi

16 December 2023 Round 10	MC Oran	0–1	US Biskra	Oran
19:00		Report	Boussalem 14'	Stadium: Ahmed Zabana Stadium; Referee: Billel Soltani

29 December 2023 Round 11	US Biskra	1–1	ES Ben Aknoun	Biskra
18:00	Boukarroum 45+4' (pen.)	Report	Zaouche 20'	Stadium: 18 February Stadium; Referee: Abdelali Ibrir

5 January 2024 Round 12	CS Constantine	1–1	US Biskra	Constantine
18:30	Dib 39' (pen.)	Report	Siam 34'	Stadium: Chahid Hamlaoui Stadium; Referee: Hamza Bouslimani

13 January 2024 Round 13	US Biskra	0–0	MC El Bayadh	Biskra
16:00		Report		Stadium: 18 February Stadium; Referee: Lyes Bekouassa

19 January 2024 Round 14	MC Alger	1–0	US Biskra	Algiers
18:00	Boucherit 78'	Report		Stadium: Stade du 5 Juillet; Referee: Yahia Dahar

23 January 2024 Round 8	US Biskra	0–0	CR Belouizdad	Biskra
17:00		Report		Stadium: 18 February Stadium; Referee: Abdelmoumen Touabti

27 January 2024 Round 15	US Biskra	2–0	ASO Chlef	Biskra
16:00	Boussalem 40'; Siam 49'	Report		Stadium: 18 February Stadium; Referee: Anes Azrine

10 February 2024 Round 16	US Biskra	2–1	JS Saoura	Biskra
16:00	Ounnas 89' (pen.); Dakhia 90+8'	Report	Khelif 45+2'	Stadium: 18 February Stadium; Referee: Lotfi Bekouassa

17 February 2024 Round 17	US Souf	2–0	US Biskra	El Oued
15:30	Hadj Saad 34', 51'	Report		Stadium: 1 November 1954 Stadium; Referee: Youcef Taieb Bouderbal

23 February 2024 Round 18	US Biskra	0–1	NC Magra	Biskra
16:00	Demane 31'	Report		Stadium: 18 February Stadium; Referee: Yahia Dahar

2 March 2024 Round 19	Paradou AC	0–0	US Biskra	Tizi Ouzou
17:00		Report		Stadium: 1 November 1954 Stadium; Referee: Tayeb Benyebka

16 March 2024 Round 20	US Biskra	2–1	USM Khenchela	Biskra
22:00	Medane 3'; Boukarroum 68'	Report	Lamri 23'	Stadium: 18 February Stadium; Referee: Lahlou Benbraham

24 March 2024 Round 21	USM Alger	1–0	US Biskra	Algiers
22:00	Belkacemi 84'	Report		Stadium: Stade du 5 Juillet; Referee: Mustapha Ghorbal

5 April 2024 Round 22	US Biskra	1–0	JS Kabylie	Biskra
22:00	Khoualed 90+8'	Report		Stadium: 18 February Stadium; Referee: Billel Soltani

19 April 2024 Round 23	CR Belouizdad	4–0	US Biskra	Algiers
18:00	Meziane 45', 90'; Khacef 46'; Boussouf 60'	Report		Stadium: Stade du 5 Juillet; Referee: Akram Mechairia

26 April 2024 Round 24	US Biskra	2–2	ES Sétif	Biskra
16:00	Ounnas 30', 61'	Report	Zamoum 9'; Jiddou 17'	Stadium: 18 February Stadium; Referee: Mehadji Tayeb Bouderbal

11 May 2024 Round 25	US Biskra	0–0	MC Oran	Biskra
17:00		Report		Stadium: 18 February Stadium; Referee: Lotfi Bekouassa

17 May 2024 Round 26	ES Ben Aknoun	2–1	US Biskra	Belouizdad
17:00	Mesmoudi 9'; Toual 31'	Report	Khoualed 51'	Stadium: 20 August 1955 Stadium; Referee: Houssam Benyahia

26 May 2024 Round 27	US Biskra	0–1	CS Constantine	Biskra
16:45	Benchaâ 44'	Report		Stadium: 18 February Stadium; Referee: Anes Azrine

7 June 2024 Round 28	MC El Bayadh	2–1	US Biskra	El Bayadh
16:45	Serraoui 45+2' (pen.); Mellal 79'	Report	Tamer 70'	Stadium: Zakaria Medjdoub Stadium; Referee: Said Aouina

11 June 2024 Round 29	US Biskra	1–0	MC Alger	Biskra
16:45	Zeghnoun 2'	Report		Stadium: 18 February Stadium; Referee: Alaa Bouab

14 June 2024 Round 30	ASO Chlef	2–1	US Biskra	Chlef
16:45	Addadi 42'; Agbagno 52'	Report	Bouraada 78' (pen.)	Stadium: Mohamed Boumezrag Stadium; Referee: Massinissa Serdjane

=== Algerian Cup ===
3 February 2024 Round of 64	US Biskra	3–0	AS Bordj Ghédir	Biskra
13:45	Daouadji 9'; Darfalou 58', 85'	Report		Stadium: 18 February Stadium; Referee: Redouane Allou
Note: US Biskra Lineups: Abdelkader, Chehmat, Salem, Houhou (substituted off) 74' (Ounnas (substituted on) 74'), Benlaribi, Dakhia, Derbal, Daouadji (substituted off) 84' (Zerari (substituted on) 84'), Rahmoune (substituted off) 84' (Fellahi (substituted on) 84'), Darfalou, Khoualed (substituted off) 78' (Adaika (substituted on) 78').

8 March 2024 Round of 32	ASO Chlef	2–2 (a.e.t.) (3–5 p)	US Biskra	Chlef
15:00	Aguieb 45+2'; Agbagno 65'	Report	Boukarroum 20' (pen.); Rahmoun 45'	Stadium: Mohamed Boumezrag Stadium; Referee: Houssam Benyahia
Note: US Biskra Lineups: Abdelkader (substituted off) 120+2' (Mellala (substituted on) 120+2'), Khoualed (substituted off) 91' (Derbal (substituted on) 91'), Lakhdari, Salem, Belkacemi, Boukarroum, Zeghnoun (substituted off) 86' (Hamoudi (substituted on) 86'), Medane, Rahmoun (substituted off) 72' (Daouadji (substituted on) 72'), Siam (substituted off) 106' (Benlaribi (substituted on) 106'), Baâli (substituted off) 86' (Darfalou (substituted on) 86').

30 March 2024 Round of 16	US Biskra	1–0	MC Oran	Biskra
22:00	Medane 65'	Report		Stadium: 18 February Stadium; Referee: Anes Azrine
Note: US Biskra Lineups: Mellala, Khoualed (substituted off) 84' (Zeghnoun (substituted on) 84'), Lakhdari, Salem, Belkacemi, Boukarroum, Dakhia (substituted off) 84' (Derbal (substituted on) 84'), Medane, Rahmoun, Siam, Baâli.

16 April 2024 Quarter-finals	US Biskra	1–3	USM Alger	Annaba
20:30	Siam 23'	Report	Bacha 22'; Belaïd 74'; Belkacemi 78'	Stadium: 19 May 1956 Stadium; Referee: Lahlou Benbraham
Note: US Biskra Lineups: Mellala, Khoualed, Lakhdari, Salem, Belkacemi, Boukarroum, Daouadji (substituted off) 80' (Tamer (substituted on) 80'), Medane, Rahmoun, Siam (substituted off) 80' (Ounnas (substituted on) 80'), Baâli.

== Squad information ==
=== Playing statistics ===
No.	Pos	Nat	Player	Total		Ligue 1		Algerian Cup	
No.	Pos	Nat	Player	Apps	Goals	Apps	Goals	Apps	Goals
Goalkeepers
1	GK	(Algeria) ALG	Ahmed Abdelkader	9	0	7	0	2	0
13	GK	(Algeria) ALG	Abderrahmane Amri	2	0	2	0	0	0
30	GK	(Algeria) ALG	Oussama Mellala	24	0	21	0	3	0
40	GK	(Algeria) ALG	Lamdjed Guessoum	1	0	1	0	0	0
Defenders
2	DF	(Algeria) ALG	Ahmed Redha Houhou	2	0	1	0	1	0
4	DF	(Algeria) ALG	Tarek Adouane	21	0	21	0	0	0
6	DF	(Algeria) ALG	Hamza Salem	19	0	15	0	4	0
15	DF	(Algeria) ALG	Abdelhak Belkacemi	25	0	22	0	3	0
17	DF	(Algeria) ALG	Bilal Boukarroum	26	3	23	2	3	1
20	DF	(Algeria) ALG	Nacereddine Khoualed	22	0	19	0	3	0
23	DF	(Algeria) ALG	Adel Lakhdari	19	0	16	0	3	0
24	DF	(Algeria) ALG	Salaheddine Benlaribi	9	0	7	0	2	0
27	DF	(Algeria) ALG	Aymen Chehmat	7	0	6	0	1	0
Midfielders
8	MF	(Algeria) ALG	Mustapha Zeghnoun	28	4	26	4	2	0
10	MF	(Algeria) ALG	Hamza Ounnas	15	3	13	3	2	0
12	MF	(Algeria) ALG	Hatem Dakhia	13	1	11	1	2	0
14	MF	(Algeria) ALG	Tayeb Hamoudi	13	0	12	0	1	0
19	MF	(Algeria) ALG	Ayoub Derbal	20	0	17	0	3	0
21	MF	(Algeria) ALG	Yacine Medane	29	2	26	1	3	1
22	MF	(Algeria) ALG	Abdellah Daouadji	12	1	9	0	3	1
26	MF	(Algeria) ALG	Nizar Tamer	24	2	23	2	1	0
38	MF	(Algeria) ALG	Ouassim Zerari	1	0	0	0	1	0
Forwards
7	FW	(Algeria) ALG	Mourad Bouraada	4	1	4	1	0	0
9	FW	(Algeria) ALG	Mohamed Larbi Khoualed	21	3	20	3	1	0
11	FW	(Algeria) ALG	Chérif Siam	30	3	27	2	3	1
18	FW	(Algeria) ALG	Khalil Darfalou	10	2	8	0	2	2
25	FW	(Algeria) ALG	Mohamed El Siddik Baâli	29	3	26	3	3	0
29	FW	(Algeria) ALG	Riad Rahmoun	25	2	21	1	4	1
31	FW	(Algeria) ALG	Aymen Fellahi	4	0	3	0	1	0
82	FW	(Algeria) ALG	Mohamed Adaika	1	0	0	0	1	0
Players transferred out during the season
16	GK	(Algeria) ALG	Saber Meddour	0	0	0	0	0	0
7	FW	(Algeria) ALG	Merouane Boussalem	15	2	15	2	0	0

Last updated: 14 June 2024
Source: soccerway.com

=== Goalscorers ===
As of 14 June 2024

Includes all competitive matches.

No.	Nat.	Player	Pos.	L 1	AC	TOTAL
25	(Algeria)	Mohamed El Siddik Baali	FW	4	0	4
8	(Algeria)	Mustapha Zeghnoun	MF	3	0	3
17	(Algeria)	Bilal Boukarroum	DF	2	1	3
11	(Algeria)	Cherif Siam	FW	2	1	3
10	(Algeria)	Hamza Ounnas	MF	3	0	3
9	(Algeria)	Mohamed Larbi Khoualed	FW	3	0	3
7	(Algeria)	Merouane Boussalem	DF	2	0	2
18	(Algeria)	Khalil Darfalou	FW	0	2	2
29	(Algeria)	Riad Rahmoun	FW	1	1	2
21	(Algeria)	Yacine Medane	MF	1	1	2
26	(Algeria)	Nizar Tamer	MF	2	0	2
22	(Algeria)	Abdellah Daouadji	MF	0	1	1
12	(Algeria)	Hatem Dakhia	MF	1	0	1
7	(Algeria)	Mourad Bouraada	FW	1	0	1
Own Goals				0	0	0
Totals				25	7	32
