= 2024–25 US Biskra season =

US Biskra
2024–25 season
- President: Abdelkader Triaa
- Head coach: Mounir Zeghdoud (until 19 November 2024); Tahar Chérif El-Ouazzani (from 26 November 2024) (until 10 January 2025); Lyamine Bougherara (from 14 January 2025)
- Stadium: 18 February Stadium
- Ligue 1: 16th
- Algerian Cup: Round of 16 (relegated)
- Top goalscorer: League: Abdeljalil Saâd (4 goals); All: Abdeljalil Saâd (4 goals)

The 2024–25 season, is US Biskra's 8th season and the club's 6th consecutive season in the top flight of Algerian football. In addition to the domestic league, US Biskra are participating in the Algerian Cup. On June 27, 2024, The federal office approved the calendar for the 2024–25 Ligue 1 season with the aim of ending on May 31, 2025. The first round is scheduled for September 14, this delay is motivated both by an extended end of the 2023–24 season but also by the holding of early presidential elections which will take place on September 7, 2024. However, the Ligue de Football Professionnel decided to postpone the start of the Ligue 1 by a week, on September 21.

On 5 August 2024, US Biskra has just received a subsidy of 100 million dinars from the wilaya budget, according to a press release published by the authorities of the Wilaya of Biskra. According to this document, this financial subsidy, intended to strengthen the club's treasury, will allow USB to resume its sporting activity during the current season with ease and to honor its financial obligations. After this support, the administration announced the renewal of coach Mounir Zeghdoud's contract for one season.

== Squad list ==
Players and squad numbers last updated on 5 February 2025.
Note: Flags indicate national team as has been defined under FIFA eligibility rules. Players may hold more than one non-FIFA nationality.

No.	Nat.	Name	Position	Date of birth (age)	Signed from
Goalkeepers
1	(Algeria)	Oussama Mellala	GK	16 September 2003 (aged 20)	(Algeria) USM Annaba
30	(Algeria)	Faris Boukerrit	GK	9 March 1998 (aged 26)	(Algeria) MC Oran
Defenders
2	(Tunisia)	Ameur El Omrani	CB	11 September 1996 (aged 28)	(Tunisia) Club Africain
4	(Algeria)	Ahmed Oukkal	CB	25 February 1999 (aged 25)	(Algeria) AS Khroub
12	(Algeria)	Oussama Barkat	RB	29 January 2001 (aged 23)	(Algeria) USM Alger
14	(Republic of the Congo)	Servyl Akouala	LB	19 January 2004 (aged 21)	(Republic of the Congo) JS Talangaï
15	(Algeria)	Fateh Talah	CB	30 March 1993 (aged 31)	(Algeria) ES Ben Aknoun
18	(Republic of the Congo)	Djigo Saïkou	RB	20 November 2004 (aged 20)	(Republic of the Congo) AC Léopards
19	(Algeria)	Ayoub Derbal	CB	12 June 2001 (aged 23)	(Algeria) Paradou AC
20	(Algeria)	Nacereddine Khoualed (C.)	CB	16 April 1986 (aged 38)	(Algeria) JS Saoura
23	(Algeria)	Adel Lakhdari	CB	12 August 1989 (aged 35)	(Algeria) MC Oran
26	(Algeria)	Yacine Salhi	LB	19 December 1993 (aged 30)	(Algeria) ES Mostaganem
28	(Algeria)	Yacine Adouane	RB	12 June 2002 (aged 22)	(Algeria) Youth system
Midfielders
3	(Algeria)	Aymen Bouda	DM	19 October 2002 (aged 21)	(Algeria) Youth system
5	(Algeria)	Yacine Medane	AM	28 February 1993 (aged 31)	(Algeria) JS Saoura
6	(Algeria)	Belaid Hamidi	AM	7 May 1996 (aged 28)	(Algeria) CR Belouizdad
8	(Algeria)	Mohamed Bourahla	DM	24 May 1990 (aged 34)	(Algeria) NC Magra
13	(Algeria)	Ouassim Zerari	DM	16 June 2002 (aged 22)	(Algeria) Youth system
22	(Algeria)	Necer Benzid	CM	20 February 2001 (aged 23)	(Algeria) CR Belouizdad
Forwards
9	(Algeria)	Bouzid Dadache	ST	27 September 1993 (aged 30)	(Algeria) US Biskra
10	(Algeria)	Mohamed Amine Bouziane	LW	5 February 1996 (aged 28)	(Algeria) USM Alger
11	(Algeria)	Abdeljalil Saâd	ST	12 March 1992 (aged 32)	(Algeria) JS Saoura
17	(Algeria)	Merouane Boussalem	RW	11 February 1996 (aged 28)	(Algeria) NA Hussein Dey
21	(Algeria)	Laïd Saïdi	LW	26 April 2000 (aged 24)	(Algeria) NC Magra
24	(Algeria)	Abdelali Hadji	ST	25 June 1997 (aged 27)	(Algeria) USM El Harrach
29	(Algeria)	Riad Rahmoun	LW	9 February 2003 (aged 21)	(Algeria) Paradou AC U21

== Transfers ==
=== In ===
==== Summer ====
Date	Pos	Player	Moving from	Fee	Source
6 August 2024	GK	(Algeria) Faris Boukerrit	MC Oran	Free transfer	
6 August 2024	RB	(Algeria) Oussama Barkat	USM Alger	Free transfer	
6 August 2024	CM	(Algeria) Necer Marouane Benzid	CR Belouizdad	Loan for one season	
7 August 2024	DM	(Algeria) Mohamed Es Said Bourahla	NC Magra	Free transfer	
8 August 2024	AM	(Algeria) Belaïd Hamidi	CR Belouizdad	Free transfer	
8 August 2024	LW	(Algeria) Laïd Saïdi	NC Magra	Free transfer	
9 August 2024	CB	(Algeria) Fateh Talah	ES Ben Aknoun	Free transfer	
9 August 2024	ST	(Algeria) Abdeljalil Saâd	JS Saoura	Free transfer	
11 August 2024	FW	(Algeria) Mohamed Amine Bouziane	USM Alger	Free transfer	
11 August 2024	LB	(Algeria) Yacine Salhi	ES Mostaganem	Free transfer	
24 August 2024	LW	(Republic of the Congo) Pomi Nzaou	(Cyprus) AEZ Zakakiou	Free transfer	
25 August 2024	GK	(Algeria) Malek Djemoui	(France) Hyères FC	Free transfer	
9 September 2024	ST	(Algeria) Bouzid Dadache	NC Magra	Free transfer	

==== Winter ====
Date	Pos	Player	Moving from	Fee	Source
13 January 2025	AM	(Algeria) Yacine Medane	JS Saoura	Free transfer	
16 January 2025	ST	(Algeria) Abdouel Ali Hadji	ES Sétif	Free transfer	
4 February 2025	RW	(Algeria) Merouane Boussalem	MC Oran	Free transfer	
4 February 2025	CB	(Algeria) Ameur El Omrani	(Tunisia) Club Africain	Free transfer	
5 February 2025	LB	(Republic of the Congo) Servyl Akouala	(Republic of the Congo) JS Talangaï	Free transfer	
5 February 2025	RB	(Republic of the Congo) Djigo Saïkou	(Republic of the Congo) AC Léopards	Undisclosed	

=== Out ===
==== Summer ====
Date	Pos	Player	Moving to	Fee	Source
18 July 2024	RW	(Algeria) Chérif Siam	ES Mostaganem	Free transfer	
18 July 2024	RW	(Algeria) Nizar Tamer	ES Mostaganem	Free transfer	
24 July 2024	MF	(Algeria) Yacine Medane	JS Saoura	Free transfer	
27 July 2024	CB	(Algeria) Tarek Adouane	Olympique Akbou	Free transfer	
29 July 2024	AM	(Algeria) Mustapha Zeghnoun	ES Mostaganem	Free transfer	
14 August 2024	CB	(Algeria) Hamza Salem	Paradou AC	Free transfer	

== Competitions ==
=== Overview ===
Competition	Record								Started round	Final position / round	First match	Last match
Competition	G	W	D	L	GF	GA	GD	Win %	Started round	Final position / round	First match	Last match
Ligue 1	30	3	11	16	12	31	−19	10.00	—N/a	16th	27 September 2024	20 June 2025
Algerian Cup	3	1	1	1	2	2	+0	33.33	Round of 64	Round of 16	6 January 2025	6 February 2025
Total	33	4	12	17	14	30	−16	12.12				

Updated to match played 20 June 2025
Source: Competitions

=== Ligue 1 ===
==== League table ====
Pos	Team	Pld	W	D	L	GF	GA	GD	Pts	Qualification or relegation
12	MC El Bayadh	30	9	9	12	23	26	−3	36	
13	ASO Chlef	30	7	13	10	24	27	−3	34	
14	ES Mostaganem	30	8	10	12	23	31	−8	34	
15	NC Magra (R)	30	7	10	13	23	35	−12	31	Relegation to Algerian Ligue 2
16	US Biskra (R)	30	3	11	16	12	31	−19	20	Relegation to Algerian Ligue 2

Source: the-sports.org
Rules for classification: 1) points; 2) head-to-head points; 3) head-to-head goal difference; 4) goal difference; 5) total goals; 6) fairplay ranking; 7) playoff.
(R) Relegated

==== Results summary ====
Overall								Home						Away					
Pld	W	D	L	GF	GA	GD	Pts	W	D	L	GF	GA	GD	W	D	L	GF	GA	GD
1	1	0	0	1	0	+1	3	0	0	0	0	0	0	1	0	0	1	0	+1

Last updated: 20 June 2025.
Source: Competitive matches

==== Results by round ====
Round	1	2	3	4	5	6	7	8	9	10	11	12	13	14	15	16	17	18	19	20	21	22	23	24	25	26	27	28	29	30
Ground	A	A	H	A	H	A	H	A	H	A	H	A	H	A	H	H	H	A	H	A	H	A	H	A	H	A	H	A	H	A
Result	A	W	D	D	W	L	L	D	L	L	D	L	L	D	D	D	D	L	W	L	D	D	L	D	L	L	L	L	L	L
Position	12	8	8	7	5	7	10	12	14	15	15	16	16	16	16	16	15	16	14	16	15	16	16	16	16	16	16	16	16	16

Updated to match(es) played on 20 June 2025. Source: Competitive matches
A = Away; H = Home; W = Win; D = Draw; L = Loss

==== Matches ====
The league fixtures were announced on 11 July 2024.

All times are local, WAT (UTC+1).

Win Draw Loss Postponed

27 September 2024 Round 2	MC El Bayadh	0–1	US Biskra	El Bayadh
16:00		Report	Saâd 61'	Stadium: Zakaria Medjdoub Stadium; Referee: Ayoub Belhachemi

2 October 2024 Round 1	USM Alger	2–1	US Biskra	Baraki
19:00	Belkacemi 72' (pen.); Musa Alli 80'	Report	Talah 86'	Stadium: Nelson Mandela Stadium; Referee: Fateh Harkat; VAR: Mustapha Ghorbal

6 October 2024 Round 3	US Biskra	0–0	CR Belouizdad	Biskra
17:45		Report		Stadium: 18 February Stadium; Referee: Mustapha Ghorbal; VAR: Rafik Aouina

12 October 2024 Round 4	NC Magra	2–2	US Biskra	Magra
16:00	Kemoukh 4'; Bouchouareb 7'	Report	Saâd 39'; Nzaou 89'	Stadium: Boucheligue Brothers Stadium; Referee: Anes Azrine

19 October 2024 Round 5	US Biskra	2–1	JS Saoura	Biskra
17:45	Chahmat 37'; Saâd 86'	Report	Haddouche 3'	Stadium: 18 February Stadium; Referee: Lahlou Benbraham; VAR: Houssam Benyahia

26 October 2024 Round 6	ES Mostaganem	1–0	US Biskra	Mostaganem
17:45	Hitala 21'	Report		Stadium: Mohamed Bensaïd Stadium; Referee: Hamza Bouslimani

3 November 2024 Round 7	US Biskra	0–1	JS Kabylie	Biskra
16:00		Report	Sarr 84'	Stadium: 18 February Stadium; Attendance: 0 (close doors); Referee: Houssam Benyahia

9 November 2024 Round 8	MC Alger	0–0	US Biskra	Algiers
17:45		Report		Stadium: Stade du 5 Juillet; Referee: Akram Mechairia; VAR: Tahar Boudjemaa

16 November 2024 Round 9	US Biskra	1–2	ASO Chlef	Biskra
16:00	Hamidi 20' (pen.)	Report	Benchouya 66'; Boukhenna 90+3'	Stadium: 18 February Stadium; Referee: Anes Azrine; VAR: Abderahmane Sahraoui

2 December 2024 Round 11	US Biskra	1–1	CS Constantine	Biskra
17:30	Bouziane 39'	Report	Enow 89'	Stadium: 18 February Stadium; Referee: Alaa Bouab; VAR: Tahar Boudjemaa

8 December 2024 Round 12	MC Oran	1–0	US Biskra	Bir El Djir
20:00	Aggoun 78'	Report		Stadium: Miloud Hadefi Stadium; Referee: Fateh Harkat; VAR: Rafik Aouina

14 December 2024 Round 13	US Biskra	0–1	Olympique Akbou	Biskra
17:00		Report	Chelfaoui 53'	Stadium: 18 February Stadium; Referee: Rafik Aouina; VAR: Redouane Allou

21 December 2024 Round 14	USM Khenchela	0–0	US Biskra	Khenchela
15:00		Report		Stadium: Amar Hamam Stadium; Referee: Redouane Allou

27 December 2024 Round 15	US Biskra	0–0	ES Sétif	Biskra
16:00		Report		Stadium: 18 February Stadium; Referee: Youcef Taieb Bouderbal; VAR: Fateh Harkat

1 January 2025 Round 10	Paradou AC	2–1	US Biskra	Algiers
16:00	Ait Abdessalem 50'; Boulbina 64'	Report	Rahmoun 27'	Stadium: Stade du 5 Juillet; Referee: Akram Mechairia; VAR: Alaa Bouab

14 February 2025 Round 16	US Biskra	0–0	USM Alger	Biskra
17:00		Report		Stadium: 18 February Stadium; Attendance: 0 (close doors); Referee: Abderahmane Sahraoui; VAR: Fateh Harkat

19 February 2025 Round 17	US Biskra	0–0	MC El Bayadh	Biskra
17:00		Report		Stadium: 18 February Stadium; Attendance: 0 (close doors); Referee: Said Aouina

26 February 2025 Round 18	CR Belouizdad	2–0	US Biskra	Baraki
20:00	Mahious 63'; Belkhir 90+1'	Report		Stadium: Nelson Mandela Stadium; Referee: Akram Mechairia; VAR: Youcef Taieb Bouderbal

7 March 2025 Round 19	US Biskra	1–0	NC Magra	Biskra
22:00	Adaika 8'	Report		Stadium: 18 February Stadium; Attendance: 0 (close doors); Referee: Youcef Gamouh; VAR: Redouane Allou

14 March 2025 Round 20	JS Saoura	2–0	US Biskra	Béchar
22:00	Bedi 13', 73'	Report		Stadium: 20 August 1955 Stadium; Referee: Ayoub Belhachemi

4 April 2025 Round 21	US Biskra	0–0	ES Mostaganem	Biskra
16:00		Report		Stadium: 18 February Stadium; Attendance: 0 (close doors); Referee: Anes Azrine; VAR: Redouane Allou

12 April 2025 Round 22	JS Kabylie	0–0	US Biskra	Tizi Ouzou
17:00		Report		Stadium: Hocine Aït Ahmed Stadium; Referee: Youcef Taieb Bouderbal; VAR: Yahia Dehar

19 April 2025 Round 23	US Biskra	0–1	MC Alger	Biskra
16:30		Report	Ghezala 49'	Stadium: 18 February Stadium; Referee: Haithem Ghouti; VAR: Rafik Aouina

25 April 2025 Round 24	ASO Chlef	1–1	US Biskra	Chlef
16:00	Avotor 90+6'	Report	Saâd 57'	Stadium: Mohamed Boumezrag Stadium; Referee: Yahia Dehar; VAR: Redouane Allou

12 May 2025 Round 25	US Biskra	0–1	Paradou AC	Biskra
18:00		Report	Boulbina 41'	Stadium: 18 February Stadium; Referee: Tahar Boudjemaa; VAR: Fateh Harkat

18 May 2025 Round 26	CS Constantine	3–0	US Biskra	Constantine
18:00	Merbah 76'; Benchaira 79'; Belhocini 83'	Report		Stadium: Chahid Hamlaoui Stadium; Referee: Tayeb Benyabka

26 May 2025 Round 27	US Biskra	0–2	MC Oran	Biskra
17:45		Report	Boukholda 10'; Mayouf 39' (o.g.)	Stadium: 18 February Stadium; Referee: Redouane Allou; VAR: Rafik Aouina

11 June 2025 Round 28	Olympique Akbou	2–0	US Biskra	Béjaïa
17:00	Adouane 31'; Boukarroum 45+3' (pen.)	Report		Stadium: Maghrebi Unity Stadium; Referee: Houssam Benyahia; VAR: Ghada Mehat

17 June 2025 Round 29	US Biskra	1–2	USM Khenchela	Biskra
17:30	Bouda 83'	Report	Boumechra 63'; Djaouchi 75'	Stadium: 18 February Stadium; Referee: Lotfi Bekouassa

20 June 2025 Round 30	ES Sétif	1–0	US Biskra	Sétif
17:00	Djahnit 23'	Report		Stadium: 8 May 1945 Stadium; Referee: Yahia Dehar; VAR: Anes Azrine

=== Algerian Cup ===
6 January 2025 Round of 64	US Biskra	1–0	SC Mécheria	Biskra
16:00	Bourahla 90'	Report		Stadium: 18 February Stadium; Referee: Abderahmane Sahraoui

11 January 2025 Round of 32	ESM Koléa	0–0 (a.e.t.) (2–4 p)	US Biskra	Koléa
14:00		Report		Stadium: Mohamed Mouaz Stadium; Referee: Mehadji Tayeb Bouderbal

6 February 2025 Round of 16	US Biskra	1–2 (a.e.t.)	ES Mostaganem	Biskra
16:00	Dadache 42'	Report	Belkhadem 13', 114'	Stadium: 18 February Stadium; Referee: Abdelali Ibrir

== Squad information ==
=== Appearances and goals ===
As of 20 June 2025

No.	Pos	Nat	Player	Total		Ligue 1		Algerian Cup	
No.	Pos	Nat	Player	Apps	Goals	Apps	Goals	Apps	Goals
Goalkeepers
1	GK	(Algeria) ALG	Oussama Mellala	24	0	23	0	1	0
30	GK	(Algeria) ALG	Faris Boukerrit	8	0	5	0	3	0
40	GK	(Algeria) ALG	Lamdjed Guessoum	3	0	3	0	0	0
50	GK	(Algeria) ALG	Radhouane Khelili	1	0	1	0	0	0
Defenders
2	DF	(Tunisia) TUN	Ameur El Omrani	6	0	6	0	0	0
4	DF	(Algeria) ALG	Ahmed Oukkal	10	0	7	0	3	0
12	DF	(Algeria) ALG	Oussama Barkat	13	0	11	0	2	0
14	DF	(Republic of the Congo) CGO	Servyl Akouala	6	0	6	0	0	0
15	DF	(Algeria) ALG	Fateh Talah	24	1	22	1	2	0
18	DF	(Republic of the Congo) CGO	Djigo Saïkoua	11	0	9	0	2	0
19	DF	(Algeria) ALG	Ayoub Derbal	18	0	15	0	3	0
20	DF	(Algeria) ALG	Nacereddine Khoualed	21	0	21	0	0	0
23	DF	(Algeria) ALG	Adel Lakhdari	20	0	18	0	2	0
26	DF	(Algeria) ALG	Yacine Salhi	20	0	20	0	0	0
28	DF	(Algeria) ALG	Yacine Adouane	3	0	2	0	1	0
32	DF	(Algeria) ALG	Wail Aiche	1	0	1	0	0	0
43	DF	(Algeria) ALG	Abderrahmane Yagoub	2	0	2	0	0	0
Midfielders
3	MF	(Algeria) ALG	Aymen Bouda	16	1	14	1	2	0
5	MF	(Algeria) ALG	Yacine Medane	11	0	10	0	1	0
6	MF	(Algeria) ALG	Belaid Hamidi	13	1	11	1	2	0
8	MF	(Algeria) ALG	Mohamed Bourahla	25	1	22	0	3	1
13	MF	(Algeria) ALG	Ouassim Zerari	9	0	9	0	0	0
22	MF	(Algeria) ALG	Necer Benzid	14	0	12	0	2	0
31	MF	(Algeria) ALG	Imadeddine Diha	5	0	5	0	0	0
33	MF	(Algeria) ALG	Abdelouahab M'Ghezzi	7	0	6	0	1	0
35	MF	(Algeria) ALG	Abdelhakim Benzetta	5	0	5	0	0	0
36	MF	(Algeria) ALG	Abdelmalek Kaddour	1	0	1	0	0	0
37	MF	(Algeria) ALG	Ishak Mayouf	4	0	4	0	0	0
39	MF	(Algeria) ALG	Riyadh Bendi	4	0	4	0	0	0
42	MF	(Algeria) ALG	Baha Eddine Tobbeche	2	0	2	0	0	0
44	MF	(Algeria) ALG	Ramzi Mohammedi	3	0	3	0	0	0
46	MF	(Algeria) ALG	Rabah Mihoubi	3	0	3	0	0	0
Forwards
9	FW	(Algeria) ALG	Bouzid Dadache	23	1	20	0	3	1
10	FW	(Algeria) ALG	Mohamed Amine Bouziane	19	1	18	1	1	0
11	FW	(Algeria) ALG	Abdeljalil Saâd	23	4	21	4	2	0
17	FW	(Algeria) ALG	Merouane Boussalem	5	0	4	0	1	0
21	FW	(Algeria) ALG	Laïd Saïdi	25	0	22	0	3	0
24	FW	(Algeria) ALG	Abdelali Hadji	7	0	6	0	1	0
29	FW	(Algeria) ALG	Riad Rahmoun	11	1	9	1	2	0
47	FW	(Algeria) ALG	Rayane Adaika	10	1	9	1	1	0
48	FW	(Algeria) ALG	Ahmed Yassine Salah	3	0	3	0	0	0
Players transferred out during the season
16	GK	(Algeria) ALG	Djemoui Malek	0	0	0	0	0	0
24	DF	(Algeria) ALG	Salaheddine Benlaribi	7	0	7	0	0	0
27	DF	(Algeria) ALG	Aymen Chehmat	13	1	12	1	1	0
17	MF	(Algeria) ALG	Benamar Mellal	11	0	10	0	1	0
7	FW	(Republic of the Congo) CGO	Pomi Nzaou	6	1	6	1	0	0
25	FW	(Algeria) ALG	Mohamed El Siddik Baâli	12	0	11	0	1	0

Last updated: 20 June 2025
Source: soccerway.com

=== Goalscorers ===
As of 20 June 2025

Includes all competitive matches.

No.	Nat.	Player	Pos.	L1	AC	TOTAL
11	(Algeria)	Abdeljalil Saâd	FW	4	0	4
15	(Algeria)	Fateh Talah	DF	1	0	1
7	(Republic of the Congo)	Pomi Nzaou	FW	1	0	1
27	(Algeria)	Aymen Chehmat	DF	1	0	1
6	(Algeria)	Belaid Hamidi	MF	1	0	1
10	(Algeria)	Mohamed Amine Bouziane	FW	1	0	1
29	(Algeria)	Riad Rahmoun	FW	1	0	1
47	(Algeria)	Rayane Adaika	FW	1	0	1
3	(Algeria)	Aymen Bouda	MF	1	0	1
8	(Algeria)	Mohamed Bourahla	MF	0	1	1
9	(Algeria)	Bouzid Dadache	FW	0	1	1
Own Goals				0	0	0
Totals				12	2	14

=== Clean sheets ===
As of 20 June 2025

					Clean sheets		
No.	Nat	Name	GP	GA	L 1	AC	Total
1	(Algeria)	Oussama Mellala	25	22	7	1	8
30	(Algeria)	Faris Boukerrit	8	6	3	2	5
40	(Algeria)	Lamdjed Guessoum	3	3	1	0	1
50	(Algeria)	Radhouane Khelili	1	2	0	0	0
		TOTALS		33	11	3	14
