= 2019–20 US Biskra season =

US Biskra
2019–20 season
- Chairman: Vacant
- Head coach: Nadir Leknaoui (from 2 July 2019) (until 28 December 2019)
- Stadium: Stade du 18 Février
- Ligue 1: Pre-season
- Algerian Cup: Round of 64

In the 2019–20 season, US Biskra competed in the Ligue 1 for the 3ed season, as well as the Algerian Cup. On March 15, 2020, the Ligue de Football Professionnel (LFP) decided to halt the season due to the COVID-19 pandemic in Algeria. On July 29, 2020, the LFP declared that season is over and CR Belouizdad to be the champion, the promotion of four teams from the League 2, and scraping the relegation for the current season.

== Competitions ==
=== Overview ===
Competition	Record								Started round	Final position / round	First match	Last match
Competition	G	W	D	L	GF	GA	GD	Win %	Started round	Final position / round	First match	Last match
Ligue 1	0	0	0	0	0	0	+0	—	—N/a	To be confirmed	15 August 2019	In Progress
Algerian Cup	0	0	0	0	0	0	+0	—	Round of 64	To be confirmed	28 December 2019	In Progress
Total	0	0	0	0	0	0	+0	—				

Updated to match played 3 June 2019
Source: Competitions

== League table ==
Pos	Team	Pld	W	D	L	GF	GA	GD	Pts	PPG
12	ASO Chlef	21	6	7	8	15	17	−2	25	1.19
13	CA Bordj Bou Arreridj	22	6	7	9	22	29	−7	25	1.14
14	US Biskra	22	6	3	13	17	33	−16	21	0.95
15	NA Hussein Dey	22	4	7	11	14	27	−13	19 (Note: Head-to-head points: Magra 3, Hussein Day 0)	0.86
16	NC Magra	22	4	7	11	16	30	−14	19	0.86

Updated to match(es) played on 15 March 2020. Source: dzfoot.com
Rules for classification: 1) points; 2) head-to-head points; 3) head-to-head goal difference; 4) goal difference; 5) total goals; 6) fairplay ranking; 7) playoff.

=== Results summary ===
Overall								Home						Away					
Pld	W	D	L	GF	GA	GD	Pts	W	D	L	GF	GA	GD	W	D	L	GF	GA	GD
0	0	0	0	0	0	0	0	0	0	0	0	0	0	0	0	0	0	0	0

Last updated: 22 April 2018.
Source: Competitive matches

=== Results by round ===
Round	1	2	3	4	5	6	7	8	9	10	11	12	13	14	15	16	17	18	19	20	21	22	23	24	25	26	27	28	29	30
Ground																														
Result																														
Position																														

Updated to match(es) played on 22 April 2019. Source: Competitive matches
A = Away; H = Home; W = Win; D = Draw; L = Loss

=== Matches ===
Win Draw Loss

15 August 2019 Round 1	US Biskra	1–0	Paradou AC	Biskra
21:00	Messadia 11'	Soccerway report		Stadium: Stade du 18 Février; Referee: Ahmed Bouzrar

19 August 2019 Round 2	JS Kabylie	3–2	US Biskra	Tizi Ouzou
21:00	Addadi 31'; Hamroune 71'; Souyad 80'	Soccerway report	Lakhdari 50'; Messadia 75'	Stadium: Stade 1er Novembre 1954; Referee: Missoum Benabdellah

30 August 2019 Round 3	US Biskra	1–0	ASO Chlef	Biskra
20:00	Benachour 69' (pen.)	Soccerway report		Stadium: Stade du 18 Février; Referee: Amine Sekhraoui

24 September 2019 Round 5	US Biskra	1–2	USM Bel Abbès	Biskra
19:00	Boufligha 81'	Soccerway report	Bouda 3'; Gharbi 45'	Stadium: Stade du 18 Février; Referee: Hamza Boucetta

28 September 2019 Round 6	ES Sétif	2–0	US Biskra	Sétif
18:45	Souibaâh 2'; Saïdi 46'	Soccerway report		Stadium: Stade 8 Mai 1945; Referee: Yazid Ibrir

5 October 2019 Round 7	US Biskra	2–1	CS Constantine	Biskra
19:00	Dakhia 42' (pen.); Cissé 82'	Soccerway report	Djabout 61'	Stadium: Stade du 18 Février; Referee: Abderrezzak Arab

12 October 2019 Round 4	CR Belouizdad	3–2	US Biskra	Belouizdad
16:00	Bechou 4'; Belahouel 18' (pen.), 82'	Soccerway report	Lakhdari 45' (pen.); Benkouider 61'	Stadium: Stade 20 Août 1955; Referee: Malek Ait Ameur

23 October 2019 Round 8	AS Ain M'lila	3–0	US Biskra	Aïn M'lila
15:00	Dib 17', 27'; Tiaiba 31'	Soccerway report		Stadium: Touhami Zoubir Khelifi Stadium; Referee: Lyés Bekouassa

30 October 2019 Round 9	US Biskra	0–3	MC Alger	Biskra
18:00		Soccerway report		Stadium: Stade du 18 Février; Referee: Ahmed Bouzrar
Note: Penalty lost to US Biskra and award the win to MC Alger who scores three (03) points and a score of 3/0.

9 November 2019 Round 10	JS Saoura	2–1	US Biskra	Béchar
18:00	Hammia 57', 65' (pen.)	Soccerway report	Messadia 7'	Stadium: Stade 20 Août 1955; Referee: Farouk Mial

23 November 2019 Round 11	US Biskra	1–0	USM Alger	Biskra
17:00	Guebli 31'	Soccerway report		Stadium: Stade du 18 Février; Attendance: 0 (close doors); Referee: Youcef Gamouh

30 November 2019 Round 12	MC Oran	0–0	US Biskra	Oran
15:00		Soccerway report		Stadium: Ahmed Zabana Stadium; Attendance: 0 (close doors); Referee: Lotfi Bekouassa

7 December 2019 Round 13	US Biskra	0–0	CA Bordj Bou Arreridj	Biskra
16:00		Soccerway report		Stadium: Stade du 18 Février; Attendance: 0 (close doors); Referee: Redouane Necib

16 December 2019 Round 14	NC Magra	1–0	US Biskra	Ras El Oued
15:00	Demane 84'	Soccerway report		Stadium: Stade Martyr Al Taher Qidum; Referee: Nabil Boukhalfa

21 December 2019 Round 15	US Biskra	2–3	NA Hussein Dey	Biskra
16:00	Hamzaoui 3'; Guebli 62'	Soccerway report	Lakhdari 23' (o.g.); Haroun 40'; Khacef 83'	Stadium: Stade du 18 Février; Referee: Lahlou Benbraham

6 February 2020 Round 16	Paradou AC	2–0	US Biskra	Bologhine
17:00	Bouzok 54' (pen.), 70'	Soccerway report		Stadium: Omar Hamadi Stadium; Referee: Bilal Bendjahene

9 February 2020 Round 17	US Biskra	1–1	JS Kabylie	Biskra
16:00	Bouafia 72'	Soccerway report	Bensayah 45+3'	Stadium: Stade du 18 Février; Attendance: 0 (close doors); Referee: Mehdi Abid Charef

17 February 2020 Round 18	ASO Chlef	2–1	US Biskra	Chlef
17:00	Arab 44'; Boulaouidet 63'	Soccerway report	Mokhtar 23'	Stadium: Stade Mohamed Boumezrag; Referee: Mohamed Boutaraa

22 February 2020 Round 19	US Biskra	1–0	CR Belouizdad	Biskra
15:00	Mokhtar 90+9' (pen.)	Soccerway report		Stadium: Stade du 18 Février; Referee: Nabil Boukhalfa

29 February 2020 Round 20	USM Bel Abbès	0–1	US Biskra	Sidi Bel Abbès
17:00		Soccerway report	Mokhtar 62'	Stadium: Stade 24 Fevrier 1956; Referee: Lahlou Benbraham

5 March 2020 Round 21	US Biskra	0–2	ES Sétif	Biskra
15:00		Soccerway report	Karaoui 45+2'; Ghacha 73'	Stadium: Stade du 18 Février; Referee: Said Aouina

15 March 2020 Round 22	CS Constantine	3–0	US Biskra	Constantine
16:00	Yettou 38'; Abid 52'; Amokrane 75'	Soccerway report		Stadium: Ramadan Ben-Abdelmalek Stadium; Attendance: 0 (close doors); Referee: Mustapha Bessiri
Note: due to coronavirus outbreak, Ministry of Health, Population and Hospital Reform decided to be all matches played behind closed doors.

Round 23	US Biskra	Cancelled	AS Aïn M'lila	Biskra
				Stadium: Stade du 18 Février

Round 24	MC Alger	Cancelled	US Biskra	Algiers
				Stadium: July 5, 1962 Stadium

Round 25	US Biskra	Cancelled	JS Saoura	Biskra
				Stadium: Stade du 18 Février

Round 26	USM Alger	Cancelled	US Biskra	Bologhine
				Stadium: Omar Hamadi Stadium

Round 27	US Biskra	Cancelled	MC Oran	Biskra
				Stadium: Stade du 18 Février

Round 28	CA Bordj Bou Arreridj	Cancelled	US Biskra	Bordj Bou Arréridj
				Stadium: August 20, 1955 Stadium

Round 29	US Biskra	Cancelled	NC Magra	Biskra
				Stadium: Stade du 18 Février

Round 30	NA Hussein Dey	Cancelled	US Biskra	Belouizdad
				Stadium: Stade 20 Août 1955

== Algerian Cup ==
28 December 2019 Round of 64	NASR El Fedjoudj	1–2	US Biskra	Guelma
14:00	Kara 43'	Report	Dakhia 17' (pen.); Seghier 81'	Stadium: Stade Souidani Boujemaa; Referee: Bahloul, Saadi, Guessoum
Note: Lineup for US Biskra - Belkerrouche, Boukarroum, Boufligha, Salem, Lakhdari, Sameur, Dakhia, Seghier, Djabbar, Cissé (Ghoul 56’), Bencharif (Bennai 70’)

5 January 2020 Round of 32	CSA Marsa	0–1	US Biskra	Mers El Kébir
14:00	Boukarroum 52' (pen.)	Report		Stadium: Stade Fréres Othmani; Referee: Farouk Mial
Note: Lineup for US Biskra - Bousseder, Boukarroum, Boufligha, Salem, Houhou, Bentayeb, Seghier, Bennai, Hamzaoui (Djabou 62’), Ghoul, Souhbi (Belmabrouk 73’)

13 February 2020 Round of 16	US Biskra	1–0	CR Belouizdad	Biskra
15:00	Djabout 35' (pen.)	Report		Stadium: Stade du 18 Février; Referee: Farouk Mial
Note: Lineup for US Biskra - Belkerrouche, Boufligha, Lakhdari, Salem, Sameur, Boukarroum, Bennai, Mokhtar, Athmani (Bentayeb 90+5’), Bouafia (Hamzaoui 81’), Djabout (Belmabrouk 87’)

== Squad list ==
As of 15 August, 2019. Note: Flags indicate national team as defined under FIFA eligibility rules; some limited exceptions apply. Players may hold more than one non-FIFA nationality.

No.	Pos.	Nation	Player
1	GK	ALG	Hamza Bousseder
3	DF	ALG	Mohamed Assil Sioued
4	DF	ALG	Tarek Adouane
5	MF	ALG	Salim Bennai
7	FW	ALG	Ibrahim Abdallah Benachour
8	FW	ALG	Oussama Benkouider
9	FW	ALG	Ahmed Messadia
10	MF	ALG	Samer Hamzaoui
11	FW	ALG	Hakim Benrezoug
12	MF	ALG	Ismail Bentayeb
13	MF	ALG	Abdelhakim Sameur
14	DF	ALG	Mohamed Ikbal Boufligha (captain)
15	FW	MLI	Moctar Cissé
16	GK	ALG	Fares Belkerrouche

No.	Pos.	Nation	Player
17	DF	ALG	Bilal Boukarroum
18	DF	ALG	Ishak Guebli
19	MF	ALG	Fouad Bouchekrit
20	FW	ALG	Youcef Sohbi
21	MF	ALG	Salah Seghier
22	MF	ALG	Hatem Dakhia
23	DF	ALG	Adel Lakhdari
24	FW	ALG	Abdenour Belmabrouk
25	MF	ALG	Hachem Bouafia
26	MF	ALG	Hamza Salem
27	DF	ALG	Mounir Guedjali
28	MF	ALG	Oussama Gourari
30	GK	ALG	Hadj Abderahmane Amri

== Transfers ==
=== In ===
Date	Pos	Player	from club	Transfer fee	Source
18 July 2019	MF	(Algeria) Hachem Bouafia	USM Annaba	Free transfer	
15 January 2020	FW	(Algeria) Adil Djabout	CS Constantine	Free transfer (Released)	

=== Out ===
Date	Pos	Player	to club	Transfer fee	Source
30 June 2019	DF	(Algeria) Kamel Allam	MO Béjaïa	Free transfer	
