= Hamza Heriat =

Algerian footballer (born 1987)

Personal information
- Full name: Hamza Heriat
- Date of birth: 6 September 1987 (age 39)
- Place of birth: Biskra, Algeria
- Position: Defensive midfielder

Team information
- Current team: AS Khroub
- Number: 24

Senior career*
Years	Team	Apps	(Gls)
2008–2010	US Biskra	-	(-)
2010–2011	USM Alger	15	(0)
2011–2013	CA Batna	52	(1)
2013–2015	MC Oran	40	(0)
2015–2016	USM Blida	25	(0)
2016–2020	MC Oran	60	(0)
2020–2022	US Biskra	5	(0)
2022–2023	Olympique de Médéa		
2023–	AS Khroub	0	(0)
- * Club domestic league appearances and goals as of 27 October 2023

Hamza Heriat (Arabic: حمزة حرياط; born 6 September 1987) is an Algerian professional footballer who plays for AS Khroub.

== Club career ==
Heriat began his career with US Biskra. In the summer of 2010, Heriat received offers from a number of clubs including USM Alger, ES Sétif, USM El Harrach and USM Blida On 17 June 2010 he chose to join USM Alger signing a two-year contract with the club., now he play with MC Oran.
