= Hamza Ounnas =

Algerian footballer (born 1988)

Personal information
- Date of birth: 18 December 1988 (age 37)
- Position: Midfielder

Team information
- Current team: USM Blida
- Number: 10

Senior career*
Years	Team	Apps	(Gls)
2010–2013	USM Annaba	26	(1)
2013	NA Hussein Dey	?	(?)
2014–2016	USM Blida	19	(1)
2016–2018	JSM Béjaïa	?	(?)
2018–2020	DRB Tadjenanet	24	(2)
2020–2021	USM Bel Abbès	19	(3)
2021–2024	US Biskra	62	(8)
2024–2025	HB Chelghoum Laïd		
2025–	USM Blida		
- * Club domestic league appearances and goals as of 14 June 2024

Hamza Ounnas (Arabic: حمزة وناس; born 18 December 1988) is an Algerian footballer who plays as a midfielder for USM Blida.
