= Youcef Chibane =

Algerian footballer (born 1988)

Personal information
- Full name: Youcef Chibane
- Date of birth: 23 September 1988 (age 38)
- Place of birth: Kouba, Algeria
- Position: Forward

Team information
- Current team: NA Hussein Dey
- Number: 7

Youth career
- 2004–2008: IR Bir Mourad Raïs

Senior career*
Years	Team	Apps	(Gls)
2008–2010	OMR El Annasser		
2010–2011	RC Kouba		
2011–2012	USM El Harrach	1	(0)
2012–2013	JSM Chéraga		
2013–2014	JS Kabylie	14	(1)
2014	→ USM Bel-Abbès		
2014–2015	JSM Béjaïa		
2015–2017	DRB Tadjenanet	55	(17)
2017–2018	ES Sétif	7	(0)
2018	→ MC Oran	11	(6)
2018	MC Oran	15	(3)
2019	Al-Qaisumah	14	(1)
2019–2020	CS Constantine	12	(0)
2020–2021	US Biskra	35	(6)
2021–2022	RC Relizane	23	(1)
2022–	NA Hussein Dey	0	(0)
- * Club domestic league appearances and goals as of 27 October 2023

Youcef Chibane (Arabic: يوسف شيبان; born 23 September 1988) is an Algerian footballer who plays as a forward for NA Hussein Dey.
