= US Biskra =

Algerian football club

- Full name: Union Sportive de Biskra
- Nickname: Khadra
- Founded: 1934
- Ground: 18 February Stadium
- Capacity: 35,000
- President: Farès Benaissa
- Head Coach: Yamen Zelfani
- League: Ligue 1
- 2025–26: Ligue 2, Group Centre-east, 1st of 16 (promoted)
Home colours	Away colours	Third colours

Union Sportive de Biskra (Arabic: الإتحاد الرياضي لبسكرة), known as US Biskra or simply USB for short, is an Algerian football club based in Biskra. The club was founded in 1934 and the club colours are green and black. Their home stadium, 18 February Stadium, has a capacity of 35,000 spectators. The club is currently playing in the Algerian Ligue Professionnelle 1.

== History ==
US Biskra played for the first time in the Ligue 1 in 2005/06 season but they were relegated after only one season. On 13 May 2017, they returned to the Ligue 1 after eleven years of absence but they were relegated after only one season. On 4 May 2019, US Biskra returned to the Ligue 1 after one year in Ligue 2. On 21 June 2025, US Biskra were relegated to the Algerian League 2 after six consecutive seasons in Ligue 1. On 9 May 2026, they returned to Ligue 1 after one year in Ligue 2.

== Honours ==
=== Domestic competitions ===
- Algerian Ligue Professionnelle 2
  - Champion (1): 2004–05

== Players ==
Algerian teams are limited to four foreign players. The squad list includes only the principal nationality of each player;

=== Current squad ===
As of 31 August 2026 Note: Flags indicate national team as defined under FIFA eligibility rules; some limited exceptions apply. Players may hold more than one non-FIFA nationality.

No.	Pos.	Nation	Player
1	GK	ALG	Imad Benchlef
3	DF	CIV	Ezechiel Zaddy
4	DF	ALG	Ahmed Oukkal
5	DF	ALG	Mohamed El Amine Barka
6	MF	ALG	Imadeddine Diha
7	MF	ALG	Farès Bahlouli
8	MF	ALG	Khaled Neche
9	FW	ALG	Fodil Belkhadem
10	FW	ALG	Chouaib Debbih
11	MF	ALG	Islam Belhadj
13	FW	ALG	Oussama Darfalou (captain)
14	MF	COM	Yassine Saindou
15	DF	ALG	Oussama Gatal
16	GK	ALG	Redouane Maachou

No.	Pos.	Nation	Player
17	DF	ALG	Khaled Bouhakak
18	MF	ALG	Mohamed Bahlouli
19	FW	ALG	Chawki Gheddab
20	DF	ALG	Riadh Dahmani
21	DF	ALG	Mohamed Sakhri
22	DF	ALG	Ibrahim Bekakchi
23	MF	ALG	Abdelhafid Benamara
24	FW	ALG	Mohamed El Amine Hammia
26	MF	ALG	Abdeldjalil Ould Ammar
27	FW	ALG	Kamel Belmiloud
28	FW	COD	Aristote Zeke Omwele
29	FW	ALG	Abdelkader Ghorab
30	GK	ALG	Nasrallah Teniou

== Personnel ==
=== Current technical staff ===
Position	Staff
Head coach	
Assistant coach	(Algeria) Abdelkrim Messaoudi
Goalkeeping coach	(Algeria) Ammar Belhani
Fitness coach	
Analyst	

== Former players ==
For a list of current and former US Biskra player with a Wikipedia article, see Category:US Biskra players

== Statistics ==
=== Recent seasons ===
Season	League									Cup	Other	Africa	Top goalscorer(s) (Note: Goals in all competitions (Algerian Ligue Professionnelle 1, Algerian Cup, League Cup, African and Super Cup) are counted.)		Ref.
Season	Division	Pos	Pts	P	W	D	L	GF	GA	Cup	Other	Africa	Name	Goals	
2017–18	Ligue 1	14th	34	30	9	7	14	23	30	Round of 16			Yasser Berbache	7	
2018–19	Ligue 2	1st	55	30	16	7	7	39	28	Penultimate regional round			Ibrahim Benachour	14	
2019–20	Ligue 1 (Note: On March 15, 2020, the Ligue de Football Professionnel (LFP) decided to halt the season due to the COVID-19 pandemic in Algeria. On July 29, 2020, the LFP declared that season is over and CR Belouizdad to be the champion, the promotion of four teams from the League 2, and scrapping the relegation for the current season.)	14th	21	22	6	3	13	17	33	Round of 16			Messadia, Mokhtar	3	
2020–21	Ligue 1	14th	46	38	11	13	14	32	46	Not played	Quarter-finals		Youcef Chibane	6	
2021–22	Ligue 1	10th	50	34	13	11	10	36	32	Not played			Hichem Mokhtar	12	
2022–23	Ligue 1	12th	40	30	10	10	10	30	29	Round of 64			Baali, Siam	6	
2023–24	Ligue 1	14th	36	30	9	9	12	25	34	Quarter-final			Mustapha Zeghnoun	4	
2024–25	Ligue 1	16th	20	30	4	12	17	14	30	Round of 64			Abdeljalil Saâd	4	
2025–26	League 2	1st	62	30	19	5	6	41	16	Penultimate regional round					
