= Nacereddine Khoualed =

Algerian footballer (born 1986)

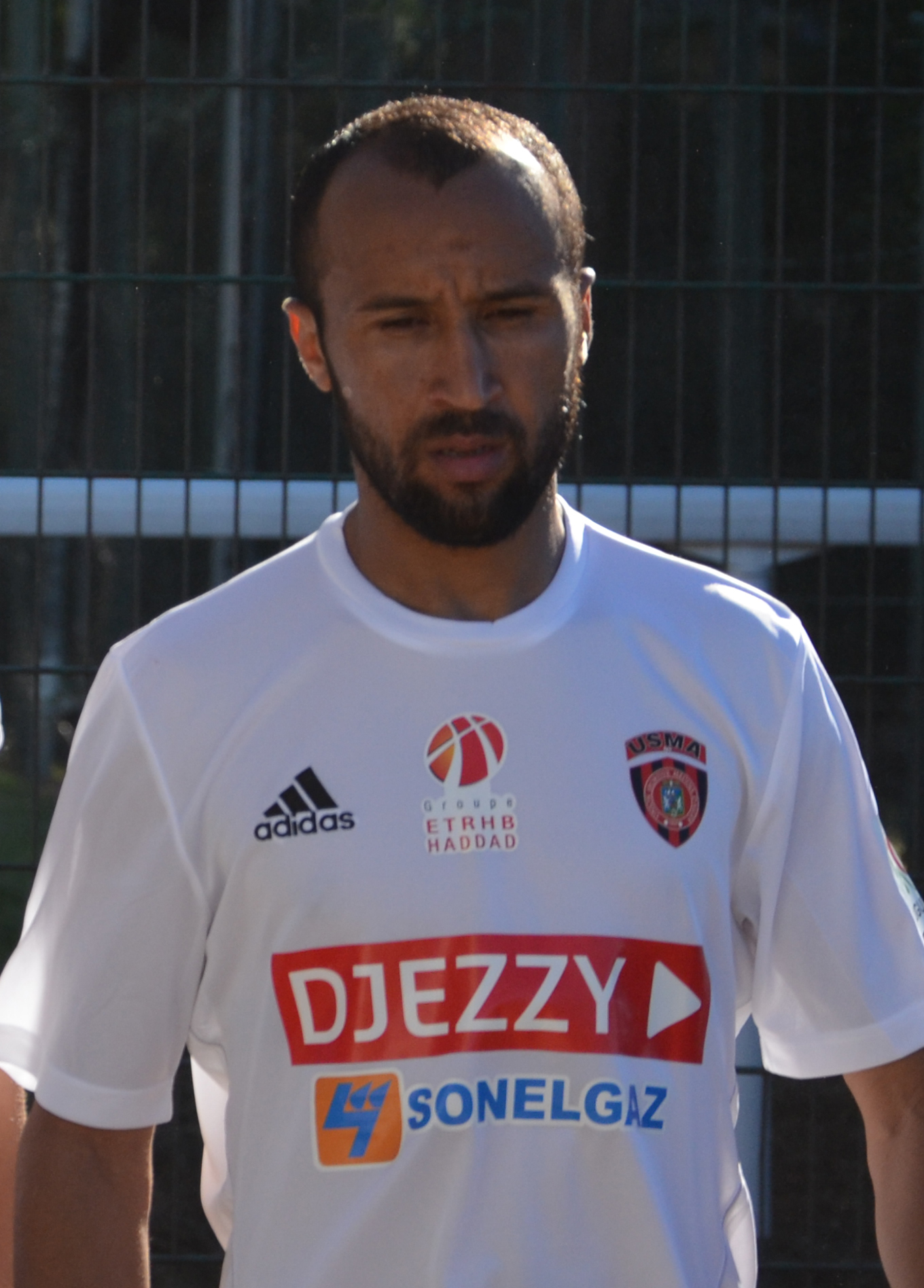

Personal information
- Full name: Nacereddine Khoualed
- Date of birth: 16 April 1986 (age 40)
- Place of birth: Biskra, Algeria
- Height: 1.75 m (5 ft 9 in)
- Position: Centre back

Team information
- Current team: USM El Harrach
- Number: 20

Senior career*
Years	Team	Apps	(Gls)
2003–2006	US Biskra		
2006–2017	USM Alger	237	(8)
2018	Ohod	8	(0)
2018–2020	JS Saoura	16	(1)
2020–2025	US Biskra	112	(4)
2025–	USM El Harrach	6	(0)

International career^{‡}
2004–2005	Algeria U20		
2006–2007	Algeria U23		
2008–	Algeria	4	(0)
- * Club domestic league appearances and goals as of 14 November 2025 ‡ National team caps and goals as of 26 May 2019

Nacereddine Khoualed (Arabic: نصر الدين خوالد; born 16 April 1986) is an Algerian football defense player who plays for USM El Harrach.

== International career ==
He has been capped for Algeria at the Under-20, Under-23 and A' level.

== Honours ==
=== Club ===
USM Alger

- Algerian Ligue Professionnelle 1 (2): 2013-14, 2015-16
- Algerian Cup (1): 2013
- Algerian Super Cup (2): 2013, 2016
- UAFA Club Cup (1): 2013
