= Hichem Mokhtar =

Algerian footballer (born 1991)

Personal information
- Full name: Hichem Mokhtar
- Date of birth: 24 October 1991 (age 35)
- Place of birth: Relizane, Algeria
- Height: 1.83 m (6 ft 0 in)
- Position: Striker

Team information
- Current team: USM El Harrach
- Number: 22

Youth career
- –2010: RC Relizane

Senior career*
Years	Team	Apps	(Gls)
2010–2012	USM Blida	24	(2)
2011–2012	→ MC Mekhadma (loan)		
2012–2014	USM Alger	3	(0)
2013–2014	→ MC Oran (loan)	11	(1)
2014–2015	RC Relizane	8	(0)
2016–2017	NA Hussein Dey	30	(3)
2017–2018	JSM Skikda	22	(10)
2018	DRB Tadjenanet	6	(0)
2019	JSM Béjaïa	16	(2)
2020–2022	US Biskra	57	(20)
2022–2023	Al-Najma SC	?	(11)
2023	JS Kabylie	1	(0)
2024	Al-Nairyah		
2024–2025	USM Annaba		
2025–2026	US Biskra	27	(6)
2026–	USM El Harrach	0	(0)
- * Club domestic league appearances and goals as of 3 August 2026

Hichem Mokhtar (Arabic: هشام مختار; born 24 October 1991) is an Algerian professional footballer who plays as a striker for USM El Harrach.

== Club career ==
In summer 2010, Mokhtari signed a four-year contract with USM Blida. On October 2, 2010, he made his professional debut for the club as a starter in a league game against CA Bordj Bou Arréridj.

On April 30, 2011, Mokhtari was a starter in USM Blida's triumph in the 2011 Algerian Junior Cup Final against ES Sétif.

On 26 June 2022, Mokhtar joined Saudi club Al-Najma SC.

On 29 July 2023, he joined JS Kabylie.

On 9 February 2024, Mokhtar joined Saudi Second Division side Al-Nairyah.

On 2 August 2026, he joined USM El Harrach.

== Honours ==
USM Blida

- Algerian Junior Cup: 2010–11

NA Hussein Dey

- Algerian Cup runner-up: 2015–16

JSM Béjaïa

- Algerian Cup runner-up: 2018–19

Al-Najma SC

- Saudi Second Division: 2022–23
