= Adel Lakhdari =

Algerian footballer (born 1989)

Personal information
- Full name: Adel Lakhdari
- Date of birth: 12 August 1989 (age 37)
- Place of birth: Algeria
- Height: 1.85 m (6 ft 1 in)
- Position: Defender

Team information
- Current team: US Biskra
- Number: 23

Senior career*
Years	Team	Apps	(Gls)
2010–2011	US Biskra	-	(-)
2011–2013	ES Sétif	36	(1)
2013–2015	ASO Chlef	48	(2)
2015–2017	MO Béjaïa	40	(5)
2017–2018	MC Oran	3	(0)
2018–	US Biskra	97	(5)

International career^{‡}
2010	Algeria U23	5	(0)
- * Club domestic league appearances and goals as of 14 June 2024 ‡ National team caps and goals as of 3 May 2012

Adel Lakhdari (Arabic: عادل لخضاري; born 12 August 1989) is an Algerian football player who plays for US Biskra in the Algerian Ligue Professionnelle 2.

== Club career ==
On January 12, 2011, Lakhdari signed a 2 1/2-year contract with ES Sétif.

== Honours ==
- Won the Algerian Cup once with ES Sétif in 2012
