= 18 February Stadium (Biskra) =

Football stadium in Magra, Algeria

Coordinates: 34.8430°N 5.7542°E

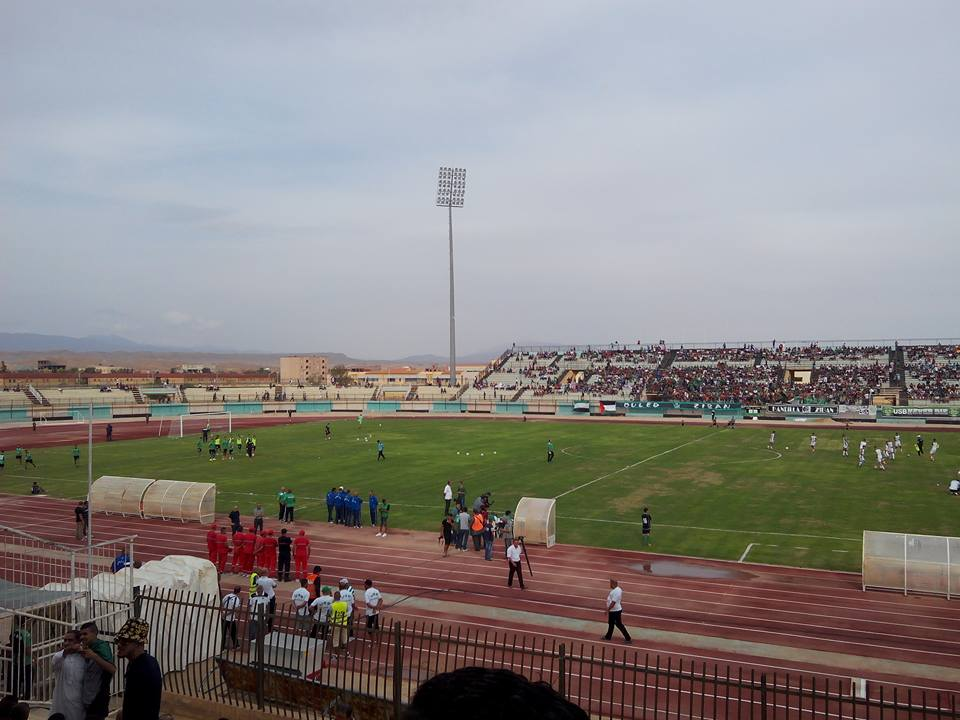
- Interactive map of 18 February Stadium
- Location: Biskra, Algeria
- Owner: OPOW de Biskra
- Capacity: 30,000
- Surface: Mixto hybrid grass

Tenant
- US Biskra

18 February Stadium (Arabic: ملعب 18 فبراير), is a multi-use stadium in Biskra, Algeria. It is currently used mostly for football matches and it is the home ground of football club US Biskra. The stadium holds 30,000 people. The stadium is a part of El Alia Sport Complex.
