= 2022–23 JS Kabylie season =

JS Kabylie
2022–23 season
- Owner: ATM Mobilis (from 29 November 2022)
- President: Yazid Yarichène (until 1 March 2023); Abdelaziz Zerrouki (from 7 March 2023) (until 8 May 2023); Achour Cheloul (from 8 May 2023)
- Head coach: José Riga (from 22 June 2022) (until 6 September 2022); Abdelkader Amrani (from 13 September 2022) (until 1 December 2022); Miloud Hamdi (from 2 December 2022) (until 1 May 2023); Youcef Bouzidi (from 1 May 2023)
- Stadium: 1 November 1954 Stadium
- Ligue 1: 14th
- Algerian Cup: Round of 32
- Champions League: Quarter-finals
- Top goalscorer: League: Dadi El Hocine Mouaki (12 goals); All: Dadi El Hocine Mouaki (14 goals)
- Biggest win: JS Kabylie 4–0 RC Arbaâ; JS Kabylie 4–0 MC Oran
- Biggest defeat: Wydad AC 3–0 JS Kabylie
Home colours	Away colours

The 2022–23 season, was JS Kabylie's 54th consecutive season in the top flight of Algerian football. In addition to the domestic league, JS Kabylie participated in the Algerian Cup and the Champions League.

After the refusal to open up the capital to private investors, on November 29, 2022, Djaffar Ait Mouloud, president of the Club Sportif Amateur (CSA) which owns JS Kabylie, announced that an agreement with the public company ATM Mobilis would take place for the purchase of 80% of the club's shares.

== Squad list ==
Players and squad numbers last updated on 5 February 2023.
Note: Flags indicate national team as has been defined under FIFA eligibility rules. Players may hold more than one non-FIFA nationality.

No.	Nat.	Position	Name	Date of birth (age)	Signed from
Goalkeepers
1	(Algeria)	GK	Yacine Sidi Salah	14 August 1996 (aged 26)	(Algeria) ES Ben Aknoun
22	(Algeria)	GK	Abderrahmane Medjadel	1 July 1998 (aged 24)	(Algeria) Paradou AC
Defenders
3	(Algeria)	LB	Sabri Cheraitia	23 March 1996 (aged 26)	(Algeria) CR Belouizdad
4	(Algeria)	CB	Badreddine Souyad	3 May 1995 (aged 27)	(Morocco) MC Oujda
5	(Algeria)	CB	Fateh Talah	30 March 1993 (aged 29)	(Algeria) JS Saoura
12	(Algeria)	RB	Mohamed Guemroud	28 August 1994 (aged 28)	(Algeria) CS Constantine
13	(Algeria)	LB	Moussa Benzaid	3 March 1999 (aged 23)	(Algeria) HB Chelghoum Laïd
20	(Algeria)	LB	Yacine Salhi	19 December 1993 (aged 29)	(Algeria) CS Constantine
23	(Algeria)	RB	Oussama Gatal	14 May 1997 (aged 25)	(Algeria) CA Bordj Bou Arréridj
25	(Algeria)	CB	Khaled Bouhakak	18 September 1993 (aged 29)	(Algeria) AS Aïn M'lila
Midfielders
6	(Algeria)	MF	Lyes Benyoucef	2 March 1996 (aged 26)	(Tunisia) ES Sahel
8	(Algeria)	MF	Juba Oukaci	8 July 1996 (aged 26)	(Algeria) Youth system
16	(Algeria)	MF	Noufel Ould Hamou	16 February 1999 (aged 23)	(Algeria) RC Relizane
19	(Algeria)	MF	Salim Boukhanchouche	6 October 1991 (aged 31)	(Tunisia) ES Sahel
21	(Algeria)	MF	Mohamed Reda Boumechra	3 June 1997 (aged 25)	(Algeria) USM Alger
26	(Algeria)	MF	Rachid Aït-Atmane	4 February 1993 (aged 29)	(Libya) Al-Ahly SC
27	(Algeria)	MF	Sid Ahmed Matallah	14 January 1996 (aged 26)	(Algeria) MC El Bayadh
51	(Algeria)	MF	Kaïs Nasri	21 August 2002 (aged 20)	(Italy) Lazio
Forwards
7	(Algeria)	FW	Massinissa Nezla	12 September 1998 (aged 24)	(Algeria) Youth system
9	(Burkina Faso)	FW	Lamine Ouattara	14 June 1998 (aged 24)	(Burkina Faso) AS SONABEL
10	(Algeria)	FW	Adem Redjem	1 January 1997 (aged 26)	(Algeria) Paradou AC
11	(Algeria)	FW	Redouane Zerdoum	1 January 1999 (aged 24)	(Tunisia) Club Africain
14	(Algeria)	FW	Yacine Guenina	February 15, 1995 (aged 27)	(Algeria) MC Oran
15	(Algeria)	FW	Dadi El Hocine Mouaki	11 September 1996 (aged 26)	(Tunisia) ES Sahel
17	(Bosnia and Herzegovina)	FW	Semir Smajlagić	18 September 1998 (aged 24)	(Bosnia and Herzegovina) Tuzla City
18	(Algeria)	FW	Mostapha Alili	30 November 1996 (aged 26)	(Algeria) ASO Chlef
24	(Algeria)	FW	Kouceila Boualia	14 March 2001 (aged 21)	(Algeria) Youth system

== Transfers ==
=== In ===
==== Summer ====
Date	Pos	Player	From club	Transfer fee	Source
13 June 2022	RB	(Algeria) Mohamed Guemroud	CS Constantine	Free transfer	
13 June 2022	LB	(Algeria) Yassine Salhi	CS Constantine	Free transfer	
22 June 2022	CB	(Algeria) Rayan Senhadji	(Denmark) Jammerbugt	Free transfer	
22 June 2022	MF	(Algeria) Kaïs Nasri	(Italy) Lazio	Free transfer	
24 June 2022	FW	(Burkina Faso) Zakaria Sanogo	Ararat-Armenia	Free transfer	
30 June 2022	MF	(Algeria) Lyes Benyoucef	(Tunisia) ES Sahel	Free transfer	
30 June 2022	MF	(Algeria) Noufel Ould Hamou	RC Relizane	Free transfer	
14 July 2022	FW	(Algeria) Mostapha Alili	ASO Chlef	Free transfer	
2 August 2022	FW	(Algeria) Redouane Zerdoum	(Tunisia) Club Africain	Free transfer	
5 August 2022	LB	(Algeria) Sabri Cheraitia	CR Belouizdad	Free transfer	
6 August 2022	FW	(Algeria) Yacine Guenina	MC Oran	Free transfer	
22 August 2022	GK	(Algeria) Abderrahmane Medjadel	Paradou AC	5,0000,000 DA	

==== Winter ====
Date	Pos	Player	From club	Transfer fee	Source
17 January 2023	FW	(Bosnia and Herzegovina) Semir Smajlagić	Unattached	Free transfer	
28 January 2023	MF	(Algeria) Sid Ahmed Matallah	MC El Bayadh	Free transfer	
29 January 2023	MF	(Algeria) Rachid Aït-Atmane	(Libya) Al-Ahly SC	Free transfer	
31 January 2023	FW	(Algeria) Adem Redjem	Paradou AC	Undisclosed	

=== Out ===
==== Summer ====
Date	Pos	Player	To club	Transfer fee	Source
23 June 2022	FW	(Algeria) Rédha Bensayah	(Saudi Arabia) Al-Jabalain	Free transfer	
21 July 2022	DF	(Algeria) Yacouba Doumbia	Unattached	Released	
2 August 2022	FW	(Algeria) Mohamed Merazi	JSM Tiaret	Free transfer	
4 August 2022	CB	(Algeria) Ahmed Kerroum	ASO Chlef	Free transfer	
6 August 2022	MF	(Algeria) Mohamed Khelfaoui	MO Constantine	Free transfer	
9 August 2022	MF	(Algeria) Ammar El Orfi	NC Magra	Free transfer	
10 August 2022	MF	(Algeria) Yacine Medane	US Biskra	Free transfer	
11 August 2022	LB	(Algeria) Abdelmoumen Chikhi	CR Belouizdad	Free transfer	
15 August 2022	MF	(Algeria) Mehdi Chenane	ES Ben Aknoun	Free transfer	
22 August 2022	GK	(Algeria) Azzedine Doukha	CR Belouizdad	15,0000,000 DA	

==== Winter ====
Date	Pos	Player	To club	Transfer fee	Source
25 December 2022	MF	(Algeria) Zakaria Mansouri	Unattached	Released	
25 December 2022	MF	(Algeria) Chamseddine Harrag	Unattached	Released	
1 January 2023	FW	(Burkina Faso) Zakaria Sanogo	Unattached	Released	
10 January 2023	FW	(Algeria) Billel Bensaha	(Saudi Arabia) Al-Sharq	Free transfer	
28 January 2023	FW	(Algeria) Rayan Senhadji	Unattached	Released	

=== New contracts ===
No.	Pos	Player	Contract length	Contract end	Date	Source
8	MF	(Algeria) Juba Oukaci	2 years	2024	22 June 2022	

== Competitions ==
=== Overview ===
Competition	Record								Started round	Final position / round	First match	Last match
Competition	G	W	D	L	GF	GA	GD	Win %	Started round	Final position / round	First match	Last match
Ligue 1	30	10	9	11	35	26	+9	33.33	—N/a	14th	26 August 2022	15 July 2023
Algerian Cup	2	1	0	1	1	2	−1	50.00	Round of 64	Round of 32	25 November 2022	21 February 2023
Champions League	12	5	3	4	11	10	+1	41.67	First round	Quarter-finals	11 September 2022	29 April 2023
Total	44	16	12	16	47	38	+9	36.36				

Updated to match played 15 July 2023
Source: Competitions

=== Ligue 1 ===
==== League table ====
Pos	Team	Pld	W	D	L	GF	GA	GD	Pts	Qualification or relegation
12	US Biskra	30	10	10	10	30	29	+1	40	
13	NC Magra	30	11	7	12	35	36	−1	40	
14	JS Kabylie	30	10	9	11	35	26	+9	39	
15	RC Arbaâ (R)	30	10	6	14	39	43	−4	36	Relegation to Ligue 2
16	HB Chelghoum Laïd (R)	30	0	4	26	11	76	−65	4	Relegation to Ligue 2

Updated to match(es) played on 15 July 2023. Source: the-sports.org
Rules for classification: 1) points; 2) head-to-head points; 3) head-to-head goal difference; 4) goal difference; 5) total goals; 6) fairplay ranking; 7) playoff.
(R) Relegated

==== Results summary ====
Overall								Home						Away					
Pld	W	D	L	GF	GA	GD	Pts	W	D	L	GF	GA	GD	W	D	L	GF	GA	GD
30	10	9	11	35	26	+9	39	9	2	4	24	10	+14	1	7	7	11	16	−5

Last updated: 15 July 2023.
Source: Competitive matches

==== Results by round ====
Round	1	2	3	4	5	6	7	8	9	10	11	12	13	14	15	16	17	18	19	20	21	22	23	24	25	26	27	28	29	30
Ground	A	H	A	H	A	A	H	A	H	A	H	A	H	A	H	H	A	H	A	H	H	A	H	A	H	A	H	A	H	A
Result	L	L	L	D	D	W	W	L	L	L	L	D	W	L	L	D	D	W	D	W	W	L	W	D	W	D	W	D	W	L
Position	11	15	15	14	15	13	10	14	14	14	14	14	14	14	15	15	15	15	14	14	14	14	13	13	11	13	10	12	10	14

Updated to match(es) played on 15 July 2023. Source: Competitive matches
A = Away; H = Home; W = Win; D = Draw; L = Loss

==== Matches ====
The league fixtures were announced on 19 July 2022.

26 August 2022 Round 1	ASO Chlef	1–0	JS Kabylie	Relizane
17:00	Jendoubi 89'	Report		Stadium: Tahar Zoughari Stadium; Referee: Abdelmoumen Touabti

1 September 2022 Round 2	JS Kabylie	0–1	CS Constantine	Tizi Ouzou
20:00		Report	Koukpo 12'	Stadium: 1 November 1954 Stadium; Referee: Ali Nader

6 September 2022 Round 3	USM Alger	1–0	JS Kabylie	Dar El Beïda
16:30	Meziane 72'	Report		Stadium: Omar Benrabah Stadium; Referee: Nabil Boukhalfa

24 September 2022 Round 5	MC El Bayadh	0–0	JS Kabylie	El Bayadh
16:30		Report		Stadium: Zakaria Medjdoub Stadium; Referee: Mohamed Bouteraa

2 October 2022 Round 6	HB Chelghoum Laïd	0–2	JS Kabylie	Chelghoum Laïd
16:00		Report	Guenina 60'; Boualia 90+1'	Stadium: 11 December 1961 Stadium; Referee: Houssam Benyahia

21 October 2022 Round 9	JS Kabylie	2–3	ES Sétif	Tizi Ouzou
17:00	Harrag 35'; Mouaki 82' (pen.)	Report	Godwin 65'; Guenaoui 90+2'; Tabti 90+5'	Stadium: 1 November 1954 Stadium; Referee: Lahlou Benbraham

25 October 2022 Round 4	JS Kabylie	0–0	USM Khenchela	Tizi Ouzou
17:00		Report		Stadium: 1 November 1954 Stadium; Referee: Nabil Boukhalfa

6 November 2022 Round 10	MC Alger	1–0	JS Kabylie	Dar El Beïda
15:00	Hamoudi 31'			Stadium: Omar Benrabah Stadium; Referee: Abdelmoumen Touabti

12 November 2022 Round 11	JS Kabylie	1–2	JS Saoura	Tizi Ouzou
18:00	Benyoucef 18'	Report	Bellatreche 44'; Benyahia 66'	Stadium: 1 November 1954 Stadium; Referee: Lyes Bekouassa

29 November 2022 Round 12	US Biskra	1–1	JS Kabylie	Biskra
15:00	Siam 5'	Report	Mouaki 15'	Stadium: 18 February Stadium; Referee: Youcef Tayeb Bouderbali

3 December 2022 Round 7	JS Kabylie	2–1	Paradou AC	Tizi Ouzou
18:00	Mouaki 48'; Boukhanchouche 76'	Report	Bouzida 7'	Stadium: 1 November 1954 Stadium; Referee: Mohamed Bouteraa

7 December 2022 Round 13	JS Kabylie	4–0	RC Arbaâ	Tizi Ouzou
16:00	Guenina 16' (pen.); Mouaki 43' (pen.); Boukhanchouche 58'; Nait Salem 90+4'	Report		Stadium: 1 November 1954 Stadium; Referee: Nadjib Meziani

11 December 2022 Round 14	NC Magra	2–1	JS Kabylie	Magra
15:00	Ghanem 48'; Daoud 67'	Report	Mansouri 45+4'	Stadium: Boucheligue Brothers Stadium; Referee: Abdellah Benchehida

20 December 2022 Round 8	MC Oran	2–1	JS Kabylie	Oran
18:00	Benhamou 51'; Chadli 83'	Report	Talah 58'	Stadium: Ahmed Zabana Stadium; Referee: Houssam Benyahia

24 December 2022 Round 15	JS Kabylie	1–2	CR Belouizdad	Tizi Ouzou
16:00	Boualia 65'	Report	Bouras 58'; Iwuala 87'	Stadium: 1 November 1954 Stadium; Referee: Youcef Gamouh

3 March 2023 Round 16	JS Kabylie	0–0	ASO Chlef	Tizi Ouzou
16:00		Report		Stadium: 1 November 1954 Stadium; Referee: Houssam Benyahia

7 March 2023 Round 17	CS Constantine	0–0	JS Kabylie	Constantine
15:00		Report		Stadium: Ramadane Ben Abdelmalek Stadium; Referee: Mehadji Tayeb Bouderbali

5 April 2023 Round 21	JS Kabylie	1–0	HB Chelghoum Laïd	Tizi Ouzou
22:00	Boualia 71'	Report		Stadium: 1 November 1954 Stadium; Referee: Mehdi Oukil

9 April 2023 Round 22	Paradou AC	1–0	JS Kabylie	Dar El Beïda
15:45	Hamidi 19'	Report		Stadium: Omar Benrabah Stadium; Referee: Youcef Gamouh

5 May 2023 Round 18	JS Kabylie	1–0	USM Alger	Tizi Ouzou
18:00	Boukhenchouche 33'	Report		Stadium: 1 November 1954 Stadium; Referee: Abdelmoumen Touabti

9 May 2023 Round 19	USM Khenchela	0–0	JS Kabylie	Khenchela
16:00		Report		Stadium: Amar Hamam Stadium; Referee: Mustapha Ghorbal

13 May 2023 Round 20	JS Kabylie	3–1	MC El Bayadh	Tizi Ouzou
18:00	Boualia 8'; Mouaki 40'; Boukhanchouche 76' (pen.)	Report	Hitala 55'	Stadium: 1 November 1954 Stadium; Referee: Nabil Boukhalfa

18 May 2023 Round 23	JS Kabylie	4–0	MC Oran	Tizi Ouzou
18:00	Mouaki 12' (pen.); Redjem 42'; Boualia 60', 86'	Report		Stadium: 1 November 1954 Stadium; Referee: Akram Mechairia

31 May 2023 Round 24	ES Sétif	1–1	JS Kabylie	Sétif
18:00	Askar 74'	Report	Mouaki 13'	Stadium: 8 May 1945 Stadium; Referee: Bilal Soltani

6 June 2023 Round 25	JS Kabylie	2–0	MC Alger	Tizi Ouzou
16:30	Mouaki 8'; Redjem 45+2'	Report		Stadium: 1 November 1954 Stadium; Referee: Abdellah Benchehida

1 July 2023 Round 26	JS Saoura	2–2	JS Kabylie	Béchar
17:00	Hammia 12' (pen.), 90+1'	Report	Redjem 63'; Gatal 90+4'	Stadium: 20 August 1955 Stadium; Referee: Nabil Boukhalfa

4 July 2023 Round 27	JS Kabylie	1–0	US Biskra	Tizi Ouzou
17:00	Mouaki 84' (pen.)	Report		Stadium: 1 November 1954 Stadium; Referee: Nadjib Meziani

7 July 2023 Round 28	RC Arbaâ	1–1	JS Kabylie	Larbaâ
17:15	Kessili 26'	Report	Mouaki 90+4' (pen.)	Stadium: Ismaïl Makhlouf Stadium; Referee: Lotfi Bekouassa

10 July 2023 Round 29	JS Kabylie	2–0	NC Magra	Tizi Ouzou
17:15	Boualia 37'; Mouaki 77'	Report		Stadium: 1 November 1954 Stadium; Referee: Akram Mechairia

15 July 2023 Round 30	CR Belouizdad	3–2	JS Kabylie	Belouizdad
17:15	Belkhir 45+2' (pen.); Bouras 48'; Adjout 82'	Report	Mouaki 19'; Boukerou 79'	Stadium: 20 August 1955 Stadium; Referee: Abdelali Ibrir

=== Algerian Cup ===
25 November 2022 Round of 64	JS Kabylie	1–0	JSM Tiaret	Tizi Ouzou
17:00	Bensaha 64'	Report		Stadium: 1 November 1954 Stadium; Referee: Anes Azrine
Note: Lineup for JS Kabylie - Medjadel, Gatal, Benzaid, Bouhakak, Talah, Benyoucef (Alili, 46'), Mouaki (Boukrou, 82'), Ould Hamou, Guenina, Mansouri (Nechat, 90+2'), Sanogo (Bensaha, 55').

21 February 2023 Round of 32	SKAF Khemis Miliana	2–0	JS Kabylie	Aïn Defla
14:00	Seddahine; Kadri	Report		Stadium: Abdelkader Khellal Stadium; Referee: Abdelali Ibrir
Note: Lineup for JS Kabylie - Sidi Salah, Guemroud (Guenina, 64'), Benzaid, Salhi, Talah (Souyad, 46'), Ould Hamou (Benyoucef, 46'), Boukhanchouche, Alili, Zerdoum (Boumechra, 74'), Boualia (Boukrou, 82'), Ouattara (Mouaki, 46').

=== CAF Champions League ===
The draw of the qualifying rounds was held on 9 August 2022.

==== Qualifying rounds ====
===== First round =====
11 September 2022 First leg	Casa Sports (Senegal)	1–0	(Algeria) JS Kabylie	Thiès
17:00 UTC+0	Sane 67'	Report		Stadium: Stade Lat-Dior; Referee: Blaise Yuven Ngwa (Cameroon)

18 September 2022 Second leg	JS Kabylie (Algeria)	3–0 (3–1 agg.)	(Senegal) Casa Sports	Sétif
19:00 UTC+1	Mouaki 8'; Nezla 43'; Boukhanchouche 84'	Report		Stadium: 8 May 1945 Stadium; Referee: Youssef Essrayri (Tunisia)

===== Second round =====
8 October 2022 First leg	ASKO Kara (Togo)	1–2	(Algeria) JS Kabylie	Lomé
15:00 UTC+0	Ouattara 72'	Report	Alili 15'; Ouattara 18'	Stadium: Stade de Kégué; Referee: Joseph Ogabor (Nigeria)

15 October 2022 Second leg	JS Kabylie (Algeria)	1–1 (3–2 agg.)	(Togo) ASKO Kara	Sétif
19:00 UTC+1	Boumechra 15'	Report	Avotor 88'	Stadium: 8 May 1945 Stadium; Referee: Mohammad Maarouf (Egypt)

==== Group stage ====
The draw of the group stage was held on 12 December 2022.

Pos	Team	Pld	W	D	L	GF	GA	GD	Pts	Qualification	WAC	JSK	APL	ASV
1	(Morocco) Wydad AC	6	4	1	1	7	1	+6	13	Advance to knockout stage	—	3–0	1–0	1–0
2	(Algeria) JS Kabylie	6	3	1	2	4	5	−1	10	Advance to knockout stage	1–0	—	1–0	2–1
3	(Angola) Petro de Luanda	6	2	1	3	3	5	−2	7		0–2	0–0	—	1–0
4	(Democratic Republic of the Congo) AS Vita Club	6	1	1	4	3	6	−3	4		0–0	1–0	1–2	—

Source: CAF

11 February 2023 Matchday 1	Petro de Luanda (Angola)	0–0	(Algeria) JS Kabylie	Luanda
14:00 UTC+1		Report		Stadium: Estádio 11 de Novembro; Referee: Bamlak Tessema Weyesa (Ethiopia)

17 February 2023 Matchday 2	JS Kabylie (Algeria)	1–0	(Morocco) Wydad AC	Algiers (Note: JS Kabylie played their group stage home matches at 5 July Stadium, Algiers, instead of their regular home stadium 1 November 1954 Stadium, Tizi Ouzou, which did not meet CAF requirements.)
20:00 UTC+1	Souyad 87'	Report		Stadium: Stade du 5 Juillet; Referee: Sadok Selmi (Tunisia)

25 February 2023 Matchday 3	AS Vita Club (Democratic Republic of the Congo)	1–0	(Algeria) JS Kabylie	Brazzaville
14:00 UTC+1	Mabidi 65'	Report		Stadium: Stade Alphonse Massemba-Débat; Referee: Mohamed Marouf Eid Mansour (Egypt)

11 March 2023 Matchday 4	JS Kabylie (Algeria)	2–1	(Democratic Republic of the Congo) AS Vita Club	Algiers
20:00 UTC+1	Benzaid 63'; Nait Salem 86'	Report	Tchakei 55'	Stadium: Stade du 5 Juillet; Referee: Abdel Aziz Mohamed Bouh (Mauritania)

18 March 2023 Matchday 5	JS Kabylie (Algeria)	1–0	(Angola) Petro de Luanda	Algiers
20:00 UTC+1	Mouaki 90'	Report		Stadium: Stade du 5 Juillet; Referee: Dahane Beida (Mauritania)

1 April 2023 Matchday 6	Wydad AC (Morocco)	3–0	(Algeria) JS Kabylie	Casablanca
22:00 UTC+0	Sambou 38', 51'; El Moutaraji 87'	Report		Stadium: Mohammed V Stadium; Referee: Abongile Tom (South Africa)

==== Knockout stage ====
The bracket was decided after the draw for the knockout stage (quarter-finals, semi-finals and finals), which was held on 5 April 2023, 18:30 GMT (20:30 local time, UTC+2), at the CAF headquarters in Cairo, Egypt.

===== Quarter-finals =====
21 April 2023 First leg	JS Kabylie (Algeria)	0–1	(Tunisia) Espérance de Tunis	Algiers (Note: JS Kabylie will play their knockout stage home matches at 5 July Stadium, Algiers, instead of their regular home stadium 1 November 1954 Stadium, Tizi Ouzou, which did not meet CAF requirements.)
22:00 UTC+1		Report	Ben Hammouda 54'	Stadium: Stade du 5 Juillet; Referee: Amin Omar (Egypt)

29 April 2023 Second leg	Espérance de Tunis (Tunisia)	1–1 (2–1 agg.)	(Algeria) JS Kabylie	Tunis
20:00 UTC+1	Ben Romdhane 49'	Report	Redjem 85'	Stadium: Hammadi Agrebi Stadium; Referee: Jean Jacques Ndala Ngambo (DR Congo)

== Squad information ==
=== Playing statistics ===
No.	Pos	Nat	Player	Total		Ligue 1		Algerian Cup		Champions League	
No.	Pos	Nat	Player	Apps	Goals	Apps	Goals	Apps	Goals	Apps	Goals
Goalkeepers
1	GK	(Algeria) ALG	Yacine Sidi Salah	14	0	9	0	1	0	4	0
22	GK	(Algeria) ALG	Abderrahmane Medjadel	19	0	11	0	1	0	7	0
80	GK	(Algeria) ALG	Mohamed Idir Hadid	11	0	10	0	0	0	1	0
Defenders
3	DF	(Algeria) ALG	Sabri Cheraitia	13	0	8	0	0	0	5	0
4	DF	(Algeria) ALG	Badreddine Souyad	25	1	17	0	1	0	7	1
5	DF	(Algeria) ALG	Fateh Talah	17	1	10	1	2	0	5	0
12	DF	(Algeria) ALG	Mohamed Guemroud	35	0	25	0	1	0	9	0
13	DF	(Algeria) ALG	Moussa Benzaid	35	1	24	0	2	0	9	1
20	DF	(Algeria) ALG	Yassine Salhi	7	0	3	0	1	0	3	0
23	DF	(Algeria) ALG	Oussama Gattal	27	1	20	1	1	0	6	0
25	DF	(Algeria) ALG	Khaled Bouhakak	32	0	21	0	1	0	10	0
29	DF	(Algeria) ALG	Fares Nechat Djabri	13	0	7	0	1	0	5	0
Midfielders
6	MF	(Algeria) ALG	Lyes Benyoucef	10	1	6	1	2	0	2	0
8	MF	(Algeria) ALG	Juba Oukaci	29	0	20	0	0	0	9	0
16	MF	(Algeria) ALG	Noufel Ould Hamou	27	1	18	1	2	0	7	0
19	MF	(Algeria) ALG	Salim Boukhanchouche	30	5	21	4	1	0	8	1
21	MF	(Algeria) ALG	Mohamed Reda Boumechra	28	1	17	0	1	0	10	1
26	MF	(Algeria) ALG	Rachid Aït-Atmane	7	0	7	0	0	0	0	0
27	MF	(Algeria) ALG	Sid Ahmed Matallah	10	0	8	0	0	0	2	0
51	MF	(Algeria) ALG	Kaïs Nasri	2	0	2	0	0	0	0	0
Forwards
7	FW	(Algeria) ALG	Massinissa Nezla	5	1	3	0	0	0	2	1
9	FW	(Burkina Faso) BFA	Lamine Ouattara	23	1	12	0	1	0	10	1
10	FW	(Algeria) ALG	Adem Redjem	13	4	10	3	0	0	3	1
11	FW	(Algeria) ALG	Redouane Zerdoum	16	0	9	0	1	0	6	0
14	FW	(Algeria) ALG	Yacine Guenina	37	2	24	2	2	0	11	0
15	FW	(Algeria) ALG	Dadi El Hocine Mouaki	44	14	30	12	2	0	12	2
17	FW	(Bosnia and Herzegovina) BIH	Semir Smajlagić	3	0	3	0	0	0	0	0
18	FW	(Algeria) ALG	Mostapha Alili	34	1	22	0	2	0	10	1
24	FW	(Algeria) ALG	Kouceila Boualia	33	6	24	6	1	0	8	0
41	FW	(Algeria) ALG	Massinissa Nait Salem	10	3	6	1	1	1	3	1
59	FW	(Algeria) ALG	Nassim Boukerou	7	0	6	0	1	0	0	0
Players transferred out during the season
2	DF	(Algeria) ALG	Rayan Senhadji	2	0	2	0	0	0	0	0
10	MF	(Algeria) ALG	Zakaria Mansouri	13	1	10	1	1	0	2	0
27	MF	(Algeria) ALG	Chamseddine Harrag	17	1	13	1	0	0	4	0
17	FW	(Burkina Faso) BFA	Zakaria Sanogo	6	0	5	0	1	0	0	0
26	FW	(Algeria) ALG	Billel Bensaha	12	1	8	1	0	0	4	0

Last updated: 15 July 2023
Source: soccerway.com

=== Goalscorers ===
As of 15 July 2023

Includes all competitive matches. The list is sorted alphabetically by surname when total goals are equal.

No.	Nat.	Player	Pos.	L 1	AC	SC	CC 3	TOTAL
15	(Algeria)	Dadi El Hocine Mouaki	FW	12	0	0	2	14
24	(Algeria)	Kouceila Boualia	FW	7	0	0	0	7
19	(Algeria)	Salim Boukhanchouche	MF	4	0	0	1	5
10	(Algeria)	Adem Redjem	FW	3	0	0	1	4
14	(Algeria)	Yacine Guenina	FW	2	0	0	0	2
41	(Algeria)	Massinissa Nait Salem	FW	1	0	0	1	2
7	(Algeria)	Massinissa Nezla	FW	0	0	0	1	1
18	(Algeria)	Mostapha Alili	FW	0	0	0	1	1
9	(Algeria)	Lamine Ouattara	FW	0	0	0	1	1
21	(Algeria)	Mohamed Reda Boumechra	MF	0	0	0	1	1
27	(Algeria)	Chamseddine Harrag	MF	1	0	0	0	1
6	(Algeria)	Lyes Benyoucef	MF	1	0	0	0	1
10	(Algeria)	Zakaria Mansouri	MF	1	0	0	0	1
5	(Algeria)	Fateh Talah	DF	1	0	0	0	1
4	(Algeria)	Badreddine Souyad	DF	0	0	0	1	1
13	(Algeria)	Moussa Benzaid	DF	0	0	0	1	1
23	(Algeria)	Oussama Gatal	DF	1	0	0	0	1
59	(Algeria)	Nassim Boukerou	FW	1	0	0	0	1
Own Goals				0	0	0	0	0
Totals				35	1	0	11	47
