= 2021–22 JS Kabylie season =

JS Kabylie
2021–22 season
- President: Chérif Mellal (until 7 September 2021); Yazid Yarichène (from 7 September 2021)
- Head coach: Henri Stambouli (from 23 August 2021) (until 24 October 2021); Ammar Souayah (from 5 November 2021)
- Stadium: Stade 1er Novembre 1954
- Ligue 1: Runners-up
- Confederation Cup: Playoffs round
- Top goalscorer: League: Rédha Bensayah (10 goals); All: Rédha Bensayah (10 goals)

In the 2021–22 season, JS Kabylie is competing in the Ligue 1 for the 53rd season, as well as the Algerian Cup. It is their 53rd consecutive season in the top flight of Algerian football. They competing in Ligue 1 and the Confederation Cup. On September 7, 2021, the new administration effectively took over the commercial registry, allowing Yazid Yarichène to be officially the new head of JS Kabylie to succeed Cherif Mellal, the latter rejected this decision but after the police intervened he found that there was nothing he could do about it. On September 24, Karim Ziani was ordained as sports director and stated that JS Kabylie is a big club and the goal is to achieve titles, On the first day he signed international goalkeeper Azzedine Doukha, Mohamed Reda Boumechra and Zakaria Mansouri.

== Squad list ==
Players and squad numbers last updated on 20 October 2021.
Note: Flags indicate national team as has been defined under FIFA eligibility rules. Players may hold more than one non-FIFA nationality.

No.	Nat.	Position	Name	Date of birth (age)	Signed from
Goalkeepers
1	(Algeria)	GK	Yacine Sidi Salah	14 August 1996 (aged 25)	(Algeria) ES Ben Aknoun
22	(Algeria)	GK	Azzedine Doukha	5 August 1986 (aged 35)	(Saudi Arabia) Al-Raed
Defenders
2	(Mali)	CB	Yacouba Doumbia	11 April 1997 (aged 24)	(Mali) Stade Malien
3	(Algeria)	LB	Abdelmoumen Chikhi	29 February 1996 (aged 25)	(Algeria) NC Magra
4	(Algeria)	LB	Moussa Benzaid	3 March 1999 (aged 22)	(Algeria) HB Chelghoum Laïd
5	(Algeria)	CB	Fateh Talah	30 March 1993 (aged 28)	(Algeria) JS Saoura
16	(Algeria)	LB	Samir Bensaci	2 October 1997 (aged 24)	(Algeria) JSM Béjaïa
23	(Algeria)	RB	Oussama Gatal	14 May 1997 (aged 24)	(Algeria) CA Bordj Bou Arréridj
25	(Algeria)	CB	Khaled Bouhakak	18 September 1993 (aged 28)	(Algeria) AS Aïn M'lila
Midfielders
6	(Algeria)	MF	Ammar El Orfi	3 November 1998 (aged 23)	(Algeria) USM Alger U21
8	(Algeria)	MF	Juba Oukaci	8 July 1996 (aged 25)	(Algeria) Youth system
10	(Algeria)	MF	Yacine Medane	28 February 1993 (aged 28)	(Algeria) Olympique de Médéa
11	(Algeria)	MF	Zakaria Mansouri	1 November 1997 (aged 24)	(Algeria) Paradou AC
13	(Algeria)	MF	Aziz Benabdi	9 August 1993 (aged 28)	(Algeria) MO Béjaïa
18	(Algeria)	MF	Mohamed Khelfaoui	23 May 1995 (aged 26)	(Algeria) HB Chelghoum Laïd
21	(Algeria)	MF	Mohamed Reda Boumechra	3 June 1997 (aged 24)	(Algeria) USM Alger
24	(Algeria)	MF	Mehdi Chenane	27 November 1997 (aged 24)	(Algeria) US Chaouia
27	(Algeria)	MF	Chamseddine Harrag	1 August 1992 (aged 29)	(Algeria) MC Alger
Forwards
7	(Algeria)	FW	Massinissa Nezla	12 September 1998 (aged 23)	(Algeria) Youth system
9	(Ethiopia)	FW	Mujib Kassim	15 October 1995 (aged 26)	(Ethiopia) Fasil Kenema
12	(Algeria)	FW	Ali Haroun	1 February 1997 (aged 24)	(Algeria) USM Bel Abbès
14	(Algeria)	FW	Mohamed Merazi	24 June 1998 (aged 23)	(Algeria) JSM Tiaret
15	(Algeria)	FW	Dadi El Hocine Mouaki	11 September 1996 (aged 25)	(Tunisia) ES Sahel
17	(Algeria)	FW	Rédha Bensayah	22 August 1994 (aged 27)	(Algeria) JSM Béjaïa
20	(Algeria)	FW	Fouad Ghanem	16 November 1997 (aged 23)	(Algeria) CR Belouizdad
26	(Algeria)	FW	Billel Bensaha	18 February 1994 (aged 26)	(Algeria) MC Alger

== Competitions ==
=== Overview ===
Competition	Record								Started round	Final position / round	First match	Last match
Competition	G	W	D	L	GF	GA	GD	Win %	Started round	Final position / round	First match	Last match
Ligue 1	34	16	13	5	40	20	+20	47.06	—N/a	Runners-up	2 November 2021	11 June 2022
Confederation Cup	4	3	0	1	5	3	+2	75.00	First round	Playoffs round	16 October 2021	6 February 2022
Total	38	19	13	6	45	23	+22	50.00				

Updated to match played 11 June 2022
Source: Competitions

== League table ==
Pos	Team	Pld	W	D	L	GF	GA	GD	Pts	Qualification or relegation
1	CR Belouizdad (C)	34	21	7	6	54	22	+32	70	Qualification for CAF Champions League
2	JS Kabylie	34	16	13	5	40	20	+20	61	Qualification for CAF Champions League
3	JS Saoura	34	17	9	8	59	23	+36	60	Qualification for CAF Confederation Cup
4	USM Alger	34	15	12	7	45	22	+23	57	Qualification for CAF Confederation Cup
5	CS Constantine	34	15	10	9	46	29	+17	55	

Updated to match(es) played on 17 June 2022. Source: the-sports.org
Rules for classification: 1) points; 2) head-to-head points; 3) head-to-head goal difference; 4) goal difference; 5) total goals; 6) fairplay ranking; 7) playoff.
(C) Champions

=== Results summary ===
Overall								Home						Away					
Pld	W	D	L	GF	GA	GD	Pts	W	D	L	GF	GA	GD	W	D	L	GF	GA	GD
34	16	13	5	40	20	+20	61	9	5	3	22	11	+11	7	8	2	18	9	+9

Last updated: 11 June 2022.
Source: Competitive matches

=== Results by round ===
Round	1	2	3	4	5	6	7	8	9	10	11	12	13	14	15	16	17	18	19	20	21	22	23	24	25	26	27	28	29	30	31	32	33	34
Ground	A	H	A	H	A	H	A	H	H	A	H	A	H	A	H	A	H	H	A	H	A	H	A	H	A	A	H	A	H	A	H	A	H	A
Result	D	D	D	D	L	D	D	W	W	D	W	W	W	W	L	L	W	W	D	W	D	W	W	D	W	W	L	D	D	W	W	W	L	D
Position	10	12	11	11	11	11	11	11	10	10	9	9	7	6	7	8	8	5	6	4	4	4	3	3	2	2	2	2	2	2	2	2	2	2

Updated to match(es) played on 11 June 2022. Source: Competitive matches
A = Away; H = Home; W = Win; D = Draw; L = Loss

=== Matches ===
The league fixtures were announced on 7 October 2021.

2 November 2021 Round 1	Olympique de Médéa	0–0	JS Kabylie	Médéa
15:00		Report		Stadium: Stade Imam Lyes; Referee: Abdelmoumen Touabti

29 October 2021 Round 2	JS Kabylie	0–0	ES Sétif	Tizi Ouzou
15:00		Report		Stadium: Stade 1er Novembre 1954; Attendance: 0 (Note: The match was played behind closed doors due to the COVID-19 pandemic in Algeria.); Referee: Mohamed Saïdi

7 November 2021 Round 3	NA Hussein Dey	2–2	JS Kabylie	Belouizdad
15:00	Banouh 6'; Nadji 37'	Report	Mouaki 87'; Bensayah 89'	Stadium: Stade 20 Août 1955; Attendance: 0 (close doors); Referee: Mohamed Boutaraa

19 November 2021 Round 4	JS Kabylie	1–1	RC Arbaâ	Tizi Ouzou
17:00	Doumbia 30'	Report	Kessili 81'	Stadium: Stade 1er Novembre 1954; Attendance: 0 (close doors); Referee: Abdellah Benchehida

14 December 2021 Round 5	JS Saoura	1–0	JS Kabylie	Béchar
17:00	Bouchiba 1'	Report		Stadium: Stade 20 Août 1955; Referee: Bilal Bendjahene

17 December 2021 Round 8	JS Kabylie	1–0	HB Chelghoum Laïd	Tizi Ouzou
17:00	Talah 69'	Report		Stadium: Stade 1er Novembre 1954; Attendance: 0 (close doors); Referee: Mohamed Boutaraa

24 December 2021 Round 9	JS Kabylie	3–0	RC Relizane	Tizi Ouzou
17:00	Nezla 54', 60'; Bensayah 57'	Report		Stadium: Stade 1er Novembre 1954; Attendance: 0 (close doors); Referee: Abdelmoumen Touabti

28 December 2021 Round 10	ASO Chlef	1–1	JS Kabylie	Chlef
16:00	Sailaa 79' (pen.)	Report	Mouaki 71' (pen.)	Stadium: Stade Mohamed Boumezrag; Referee: Mohamad Salah Dafri

2 January 2022 Round 11	JS Kabylie	1–0	MC Oran	Tizi Ouzou
15:00	Harrag 30' (pen.)	Report		Stadium: Stade 1er Novembre 1954; Attendance: 0 (close doors); Referee: Abderrezzak Arab

7 January 2022 Round 12	CR Belouizdad	0–1	JS Kabylie	Belouizdad
15:00	Belaribi (yellow card) 22'; Mrezigue (yellow card) 38'; Belkhiter (yellow card) 78'; Bouchar (yellow card) 84'	Report	Bouhakak (yellow card) 32'; Nezla 55'; Bensayah (yellow card) 78'; Oukaci (yellow card) 81'; Doukha (yellow card) 84'	Stadium: Stade 20 Août 1955; Attendance: 0 (close doors); Referee: Abdelali Ibrir

11 January 2021 Round 6	JS Kabylie	1–1	US Biskra	Tizi Ouzou
15:00	Nezla 27'	Report	Mokhtar 53'	Stadium: Stade 1er Novembre 1954; Attendance: 0 (close doors); Referee: Youcef Gamouh

16 January 2022 Round 13	JS Kabylie	3–0	NC Magra	Tizi Ouzou
15:00	Bensayah 8', 71'; Nezla 48'	Report		Stadium: Stade 1er Novembre 1954; Attendance: 0 (close doors); Referee: Bilel Soltani

21 January 2022 Round 14	WA Tlemcen	0–1	JS Kabylie	Tlemcen
15:00		Report	Bensayah 28'	Stadium: Stade Akid Lotfi; Referee: Ahmed Benhamou

30 January 2022 Round 16	CS Constantine	2–1	JS Kabylie	Constantine
14:30	Koukpo 13'; Temine 30'	Report	Oukaci 37'	Stadium: Ramadan Ben-Abdelmalek Stadium; Referee: Youcef Taieb Bouderbal

3 February 2022 Round 7	USM Alger	0–0	JS Kabylie	Bologhine
18:00		Report		Stadium: Omar Hamadi Stadium; Attendance: 0 (close doors); Referee: Lotfi Bekouassa

10 February 2022 Round 15	JS Kabylie	0–1	MC Alger	Tizi Ouzou
17:30		Report	Zaidi 78'	Stadium: Stade 1er Novembre 1954; Attendance: 0 (close doors); Referee: Said Aouina

14 February 2022 Round 17	JS Kabylie	2–0	Paradou AC	Tizi Ouzou
17:30	Bensayah 17'; Mouaki 47'	Report		Stadium: Stade 1er Novembre 1954; Attendance: 0 (close doors); Referee: Lahlou Benbraham

25 February 2022 Round 18	JS Kabylie	1–0	Olympique de Médéa	Tizi Ouzou
15:00	Mouaki 7'	Report		Stadium: Stade 1er Novembre 1954; Referee: Ali Nader

2 March 2022 Round 19	ES Sétif	1–1	JS Kabylie	Sétif
18:00	Djahnit 27'	Report	Ouattara 34'	Stadium: Stade 8 Mai 1945; Attendance: 0 (close doors); Referee: Mehdi Abid Charef

6 March 2022 Round 20	JS Kabylie	3–2	NA Hussein Dey	Tizi Ouzou
14:30	Ouattara 18'; Mouaki 43'; Boukhanchouche 57' (pen.)	Report	Benayad 38' (pen.), 90+4' (pen.)	Stadium: Stade 1er Novembre 1954; Referee: Nabil Boukhalfa

12 March 2022 Round 21	RC Arbaâ	0–0	JS Kabylie	Larbaâ
14:30		Report		Stadium: Ismaïl Makhlouf Stadium; Referee: Lotfi Bekouassa

17 May 2022 Round 22	JS Kabylie	2–1	JS Saoura	Tizi Ouzou
17:30	Boukhanchouche 9', 22'	Report	Lahmeri 40'	Stadium: Stade 1er Novembre 1954; Referee: Mehdi Abid Charef

28 March 2022 Round 23	US Biskra	0–1	JS Kabylie	Biskra
15:00		Report	Ouattara 16'	Stadium: 18 February Stadium; Referee: Mohamed Boutaraa

1 April 2022 Round 24	JS Kabylie	1–1	USM Alger	Tizi Ouzou
18:00	El Orfi 66'	Report	Ait El Hadj 45'	Stadium: 1 November 1954 Stadium; Referee: Mehdi Abid Charef

13 April 2022 Round 25	HB Chelghoum Laïd	1–3	JS Kabylie	Chelghoum Laïd
16:45	Khaldi 44'	Report	Mouaki 36'; Bensayah 64'; Nezla 90+1'	Stadium: 11 December 1961 Stadium; Referee: Bilel Soltani

17 April 2022 Round 26	RC Relizane	1–4	JS Kabylie	Relizane
16:45	Belalia 78'	Report	Bensayah 27' (pen.), 56'; Oukaci 37' (pen.); Ouattara 61'	Stadium: Stade Tahar Zoughari; Referee: Nadjib Meziani

23 April 2022 Round 27	JS Kabylie	0–1	ASO Chlef	Tizi Ouzou
23:30		Report	Alili 63' (pen.)	Stadium: Stade 1er Novembre 1954; Referee: Akram Mechairia

29 April 2022 Round 28	MC Oran	0–0	JS Kabylie	Oran
23:30		Report		Stadium: Ahmed Zabana Stadium; Referee: Youcef Gamouh

6 May 2022 Round 29	JS Kabylie	0–0	CR Belouizdad	Tizi Ouzou
18:45		Report		Stadium: Stade 1er Novembre 1954; Referee: Houssam Benyahia

13 May 2022 Round 30	NC Magra	0–1	JS Kabylie	Magra
16:00		Report	Bensayah 54'	Stadium: Boucheligue Brothers Stadium; Referee: Lotfi Bekouassa

21 May 2022 Round 31	JS Kabylie	2–0	WA Tlemcen	Tizi Ouzou
17:45	Boukhanchouche 8'; Mouaki 64'	Report		Stadium: Stade 1er Novembre 1954; Referee: Alaa Bouab

28 May 2022 Round 32	MC Alger	0–2	JS Kabylie	Bologhine
16:45		Report	Gattal 25'; Nezla 85'	Stadium: Omar Hamadi Stadium; Referee: Mustapha Ghorbal

5 June 2022 Round 33	JS Kabylie	1–3	CS Constantine	Tizi Ouzou
19:00	Mouaki 49'	Report	Ardji 24'; Dib 78' (pen.); Bouldjedri 83'	Stadium: Stade 1er Novembre 1954; Referee: Bilal Bendjahene

11 June 2022 Round 34	Paradou AC	0–0	JS Kabylie	Dar El Beïda
16:45		Report		Stadium: Omar Benrabah Stadium; Referee: Nadjib Meziani

== Confederation Cup ==
=== First round ===
The draw for the qualifying rounds was held on 13 August 2021 at the CAF headquarters in Cairo, Egypt.

16 October 2021 First leg	AS FAR (Morocco)	0–1	(Algeria) JS Kabylie	Rabat
19:00 UTC+1		Report	Moufid 19' (o.g.)	Stadium: Prince Moulay Abdellah Stadium; Referee: Haythem Guirat (Tunisia)

24 October 2021 Second leg	JS Kabylie (Algeria)	2–1	(Morocco) AS FAR	Tizi Ouzou
19:00 UTC+1	Haroun 55', 90'	Report	Araina 57'	Stadium: 1 November 1954 Stadium; Referee: Lenine dos Santos (Cape Verde)

=== Playoffs round ===
28 November 2021 First leg	Royal Leopards (Eswatini)	1–0	(Algeria) JS Kabylie	Manzini
15:00 UTC+2	Mokenkoane 23'	Report		Stadium: Mavuso Sports Centre; Referee: Nelson Emile (Seychelles)

6 February 2022 (Note: The second leg of the JS Kabylie v Royal Leopards tie, originally scheduled to be played on 5 December 2021 at 1 November 1954 Stadium, Tizi Ouzou, was postponed to 20 December at Omar Hamadi Stadium, Algiers then to 26 January and 27 January 2022 later at the previous location due to the Algerian authorities fears of the spread of COVID-19 Omicron variant in South Africa. Later the match was again postponed to 6 February 2022, as Royal Leopards were stuck in Cairo and could not connect to Turkey for their flight to Algiers due to storms.) Second leg	JS Kabylie (Algeria)	2–1	(Eswatini) Royal Leopards	Tizi Ouzou
18:00 UTC+1	Doumbia 3'; El Orfi 88' (pen.)	Report	Magagula 16'	Stadium: Stade 1er Novembre 1954; Attendance: 0 (close doors); Referee: Naïm Hosni (Tunisia)

== Squad information ==
=== Playing statistics ===
No.	Pos	Nat	Player	Total		Ligue 1		Confederation Cup	
No.	Pos	Nat	Player	Apps	Goals	Apps	Goals	Apps	Goals
1	GK	(Algeria) ALG	Yacine Sidi Salah	10	0	6	0	4	0
22	GK	(Algeria) ALG	Azzedine Doukha	27	0	27	0	0	0
2	DF	(Mali) MLI	Yacouba Doumbia	25	2	21	1	4	1
3	DF	(Algeria) ALG	Abdelmoumen Chikhi	28	0	28	0	0	0
4	DF	(Algeria) ALG	Moussa Benzaid	17	0	13	0	4	0
5	DF	(Algeria) ALG	Fateh Talah	21	1	21	1	0	0
16	DF	(Algeria) ALG	Samir Bensaci	0	0	0	0	0	0
23	DF	(Algeria) ALG	Oussama Gattal	28	1	28	1	0	0
25	DF	(Algeria) ALG	Khaled Bouhakak	27	0	24	0	3	0
31	DF	(Algeria) ALG	Ahmed Kerroum	14	0	10	0	4	0
	DF	(Algeria) ALG	Lounas Adjout	1	0	0	0	1	0
	DF	(Algeria) ALG	Fares Nechat Djabri	8	0	7	0	1	0
	DF	(Algeria) ALG	Mohamed Iheb Benbelabbas	1	0	0	0	1	0
13	DF	(Algeria) ALG	Badreddine Souyad	14	0	14	0	0	0
6	MF	(Algeria) ALG	Ammar El Orfi	14	2	12	1	2	1
8	MF	(Algeria) ALG	Juba Oukaci	28	2	28	2	0	0
10	MF	(Algeria) ALG	Yacine Medane	7	0	4	0	3	0
11	MF	(Algeria) ALG	Zakaria Mansouri	30	0	30	0	0	0
13	MF	(Algeria) ALG	Aziz Benabdi	3	0	0	0	3	0
18	MF	(Algeria) ALG	Mohamed Khelfaoui	3	0	1	0	2	0
21	MF	(Algeria) ALG	Mohamed Reda Boumechra	21	0	21	0	0	0
24	MF	(Algeria) ALG	Mehdi Chenane	1	0	1	0	0	0
27	MF	(Algeria) ALG	Chamseddine Harrag	28	1	28	1	0	0
19	MF	(Algeria) ALG	Salim Boukhanchouche	14	4	14	4	0	0
7	FW	(Algeria) ALG	Massinissa Nezla	32	7	30	7	2	0
9	FW	(Ethiopia) ETH	Mujib Kassim	3	0	3	0	0	0
12	FW	(Algeria) ALG	Ali Haroun	3	2	0	0	3	2
14	FW	(Algeria) ALG	Mohamed Merazi	3	0	0	0	3	0
15	FW	(Algeria) ALG	Dadi El Hocine Mouaki	32	8	32	8	0	0
17	FW	(Algeria) ALG	Rédha Bensayah	34	10	30	10	4	0
20	FW	(Algeria) ALG	Fouad Ghanem	2	0	0	0	2	0
26	FW	(Algeria) ALG	Billel Bensaha	25	0	25	0	0	0
9	FW	(Burkina Faso) BFA	Lamine Ouattara	15	4	15	4	0	0
Players transferred out during the season

Last updated: 11 June 2022
Source: fr.soccerway.com

=== Goalscorers ===
Includes all competitive matches. The list is sorted alphabetically by surname when total goals are equal.

No.	Nat.	Player	Pos.	L 1	CC 3	TOTAL
17	(Algeria)	Rédha Bensayah	FW	10	0	10
15	(Algeria)	Dadi El Hocine Mouaki	FW	8	0	8
7	(Algeria)	Massinissa Nezla	FW	7	0	7
9	(Burkina Faso)	Lamine Ouattara	FW	4	0	4
19	(Algeria)	Salim Boukhanchouche	MF	4	0	4
12	(Algeria)	Ali Haroun	FW	0	2	2
8	(Algeria)	Juba Oukaci	MF	2	0	2
6	(Algeria)	Ammar El Orfi	MF	1	1	2
2	(Mali)	Yacouba Doumbia	DF	1	1	2
5	(Algeria)	Fateh Talah	DF	1	0	1
23	(Algeria)	Oussama Gattal	DF	1	0	1
27	(Algeria)	Chamseddine Harrag	MF	1	0	1
Own Goals				0	1	0
Totals				40	5	45

== Transfers ==
=== In ===
Date	Pos	Player	From club	Transfer fee	Source
7 August 2021	ST	(Ethiopia) Mujib Kassim	(Ethiopia) Fasil Kenema S.C.	Undisclosed	
11 August 2021	CB	(Mali) Yacouba Doumbia	(Mali) Stade Malien	Free transfer	
15 August 2021	GK	(Algeria) Yacine Sidi Salah	ES Ben Aknoun	Free transfer	
15 August 2021	CB	(Algeria) Khaled Bouhakak	AS Aïn M'lila	Free transfer	
15 August 2021	LB	(Algeria) Samir Bensaci	JSM Béjaïa	Free transfer	
15 August 2021	LB	(Algeria) Yasser Chelfaoui	CRB Aïn Oussera	Free transfer	
15 August 2021	RB	(Algeria) Noureddine Sadi	CA Bordj Bou Arréridj	Free transfer	
15 August 2021	CB	(Algeria) Moussa Benzaid	HB Chelghoum Laïd	Free transfer	
15 August 2021	MF	(Algeria) Mohamed Khelfaoui	HB Chelghoum Laïd	Free transfer	
15 August 2021	MF	(Algeria) Abderrahamane Boughachiche	US Chaouia	Free transfer	
15 August 2021	MF	(Algeria) Nazih Ilhoum	US Chaouia	Free transfer	
15 August 2021	MF	(Algeria) Mehdi Chennaa	US Chaouia	Free transfer	
15 August 2021	FW	(Algeria) Abdelmalek Oukil	RC Arbaâ	Free transfer	
15 August 2021	FW	(Algeria) Mohamed Merazi	JSM Tiaret	Free transfer	
1 September 2021	DM	(Algeria) Laid Ouaji	NA Hussein Dey	Free transfer	
10 September 2021	FW	(Algeria) Dadi El Hocine Mouaki	USM Bel Abbès	Free transfer	
11 September 2021	GK	(Algeria) Azzedine Doukha	(Saudi Arabia) Al-Raed	Free transfer	
22 September 2021	CB	(Algeria) Fateh Talah	JS Saoura	Free transfer	
24 September 2021	AM	(Algeria) Mohamed Reda Boumechra	USM Alger	Free transfer	
24 September 2021	AM	(Algeria) Zakaria Mansouri	Unattached	Free transfer	
26 September 2021	RB	(Algeria) Oussama Gatal	CA Bordj Bou Arréridj	Free transfer	
2 October 2021	FW	(Algeria) Billel Bensaha	(Tunisia) ES Tunis	Undisclosed	
19 October 2021	MF	(Algeria) Chamseddine Harrag	MC Alger	Free transfer	
20 October 2021	FW	(Algeria) Redouane Zerdoum	(Tunisia) ES Sahel	Loan	

=== Out ===
Date	Pos	Player	To club	Transfer fee	Source
19 June 2021	ST	(Democratic Republic of the Congo) Glody Kilangalanga	Unattached	Free transfer (Released)	
13 August 2021	DM	(Algeria) Mohamed Benchaira	Unattached (Note: Benchaira joined CS Constantine on 14 August 2021.)	Free transfer (Released)	
14 August 2021	ST	(Algeria) Mohamed Zakaria Boulahia	Unattached (Note: Boulahia joined Emirates on 22 September 2021.)	Free transfer (Released)	
15 August 2021	GK	(Algeria) Oussama Benbot	USM Alger	Free transfer (Released)	
15 August 2021	DF	(Algeria) Walid Bencherifa	Unattached (Note: Bencherifa joined Olympique Khouribga on 9 September 2021.)	Free transfer (Released)	
15 August 2021	DF	(Algeria) Nassim Mekideche	Unattached (Note: Mekideche joined CS Hammam-Lif on 9 September 2021.)	Free transfer (Released)	
15 August 2021	MF	(Algeria) Oussama Daibeche	Unattached (Note: Daibeche joined JS Bordj Ménaïel on 5 October 2021.)	Free transfer (Released)	
15 August 2021	FW	(Algeria) Hadj Habib Saïd Fellahi	Unattached	Free transfer (Released)	
15 August 2021	FW	(Algeria) Chaker Kaddour Chérif	Unattached	Free transfer (Released)	
15 August 2021	FW	(Algeria) Merouane Loucif	Unattached	Free transfer (Released)	
18 August 2021	CB	(Algeria) Ahmed Ait Abdessalem	CR Belouizdad	Free transfer (Released)	
18 August 2021	RW	(Algeria) Rezki Hamroune	(Egypt) Pharco FC	Free transfer	
31 August 2021	CB	(Algeria) Badreddine Souyed	(Morocco) MC Oujda	Free transfer	
2 September 2021	CB	(Algeria) Bilal Tizi Bouali	Unattached (Note: Tizi Bouali joined WA Tlemcen on 9 September 2021.)	Free transfer (Released)	
3 September 2021	FW	(Libya) Mohamed Al-Tubal	(Libya) Al-Ittihad	Free transfer	
15 September 2021	MF	(Algeria) Malik Raiah	(Tunisia) CS Sfaxien	Free transfer	
21 September 2021	RB	(Algeria) Racim Mebarki	WA Tlemcen	Free transfer	
21 September 2021	GK	(Algeria) Karam Hamdad	MC Oran	Free transfer	
3 October 2021	FW	(Algeria) Abdelmalek Oukil	RC Arbaâ	Free transfer	
7 October 2021	MF	(Algeria) Laid Ouaji	RC Relizane	Free transfer	
