= 2023–24 JS Kabylie season =

JS Kabylie
2023–24 season
- Owner: ATM Mobilis
- President: Achour Cheloul (until 23 April 2024); El Hadi Ould Ali (from 23 April 2024)
- Head coach: Youcef Bouzidi (until 1 October 2023); Rui Almeida (from 14 October 2023) (until 25 January 2024); Azzedine Aït Djoudi (from 25 January 2024) (until 8 April 2024); Abdelkader Bahloul (from 8 April 2024)
- Stadium: 1 November 1954 Stadium
- Ligue 1: 7th
- Algerian Cup: Round of 64
- Top goalscorer: League: Redouane Berkane (8 goals); All: Redouane Berkane (8 goals)
- Biggest win: US Souf 0–4 JS Kabylie
- Biggest defeat: CS Constantine 2–0 JS Kabylie
| Home colours | Away colours |

The 2023–24 season, is JS Kabylie's 55th consecutive season in the top flight of Algerian football. In addition to the domestic league, JS Kabylie are participating in the Algerian Cup.

== Squad list ==
Players and squad numbers last updated on 5 February 2024.
Note: Flags indicate national team as has been defined under FIFA eligibility rules. Players may hold more than one non-FIFA nationality.

| No. | Nat. | Position | Name | Date of birth (age) | Signed from |
Goalkeepers
| 1 | (Algeria) | GK | Mohamed Idir Hadid | 26 April 2002 (aged 21) | (Algeria) Youth system |
| 14 | (Algeria) | GK | Fouad Zegrar | 28 June 2002 (aged 21) | (Algeria) HB Chelghoum Laïd |
| 23 | (Algeria) | GK | Chamseddine Rahmani | 15 September 1990 (aged 33) | (Algeria) CS Constantine |
Defenders
| 2 | (Algeria) | RB | Fares Nechat Djabri | 25 May 2001 (aged 22) | (Algeria) Youth system |
| 4 | (Algeria) | CB | Badreddine Souyad | 3 May 1995 (aged 28) | (Morocco) MC Oujda |
| 5 | (Algeria) | CB | Abdelhamid Driss | 12 February 2002 (aged 21) | (Algeria) NC Magra |
| 13 | (Algeria) | LB | Moussa Benzaid | 3 March 1999 (aged 24) | (Algeria) HB Chelghoum Laïd |
| 22 | (Algeria) | RB | Oussama Gatal | 14 May 1997 (aged 26) | (Algeria) CA Bordj Bou Arréridj |
| 25 | (Algeria) | CB | Khaled Bouhakak | 18 September 1993 (aged 29) | (Algeria) AS Aïn M'lila |
| 26 | (Algeria) | LB | Ahmed Maâmeri | 25 June 1997 (aged 26) | (Algeria) CS Constantine |
| 77 | (Algeria) | LB | Rafik Mendas | 24 September 2002 (aged 20) | (Algeria) CR Belouizdad |
Midfielders
| 6 | (Algeria) | MF | Aymen Bendaoud | 18 June 2001 (aged 22) | (Algeria) CS Constantine |
| 8 | (Algeria) | MF | Rachid Aït-Atmane | 4 February 1993 (aged 30) | (Libya) Al-Ahly SC |
| 12 | (Algeria) | MF | Yuliwes Bellache | 29 September 2002 (aged 20) | (France) Clermont Foot |
| 16 | (Algeria) | MF | Ali Amriche | 8 December 1998 (aged 24) | (Algeria) US Biskra |
| 17 | (Algeria) | MF | Sid Ahmed Matallah | 14 January 1996 (aged 27) | (Algeria) MC El Bayadh |
| 18 | (Mali) | MF | Mamadou Traore | 8 February 1999 (aged 24) | (Mali) Stade Malien |
| 21 | (Algeria) | MF | Mohamed Reda Boumechra | 3 June 1997 (aged 26) | (Algeria) USM Alger |
Forwards
| 7 | (Algeria) | FW | Massinissa Nezla | 12 September 1998 (aged 25) | (Algeria) Youth system |
| 9 | (Algeria) | FW | Essang Matouti | 25 July 2003 (aged 20) | (Gabon) FC 105 Libreville |
| 10 | (Algeria) | FW | Adem Redjem | 1 January 1997 (aged 26) | (Algeria) Paradou AC |
| 11 | (Algeria) | FW | Massinissa Nait Salem | 30 April 2001 (aged 22) | (Algeria) Youth system |
| 15 | (Algeria) | FW | Dadi El Hocine Mouaki | 11 September 1996 (aged 27) | (Tunisia) ES Sahel |
| 19 | (Algeria) | FW | Jugurtha Hamroun | 27 January 1989 (aged 34) | (Qatar) Al-Markhiya SC |
| 20 | (Algeria) | FW | Faik Amrane | 26 November 1997 (aged 25) | (Algeria) NC Magra |
| 24 | (Algeria) | FW | Kouceila Boualia | 14 March 2001 (aged 22) | (Algeria) Youth system |
| 56 | (Algeria) | FW | Redouane Berkane | 7 July 2003 (aged 20) | (Algeria) Olympique Akbou |

== Transfers ==
=== In ===
==== Summer ====
| Date | Pos | Player | Moving from | Fee | Source |
|---|---|---|---|---|---|
| 17 July 2023 | LB | (Algeria) Ahmed Maâmeri | CS Constantine | Free transfer | |
| 17 July 2023 | GK | (Algeria) Chamseddine Rahmani | CS Constantine | Free transfer | |
| 18 July 2023 | FW | (Algeria) Redouane Berkane | Olympique Akbou | Free transfer | |
| 19 July 2023 | FW | (Algeria) Faïk Amrane | NC Magra | Free transfer | |
| 29 July 2023 | MF | (Algeria) Aymen Bendaoud | CS Constantine | Free transfer | |
| 29 July 2023 | FW | (Algeria) Hichem Mokhtar | (Saudi Arabia) Al-Najma | Free transfer | |
| 9 August 2023 | GK | (Algeria) Fouad Zegrar | HB Chelghoum Laïd | Free transfer | |
| 9 August 2023 | DF | (Algeria) Abdelhamid Driss | NC Magra | Free transfer | |
| 9 August 2023 | FW | (Gabon) Essang Matouti | (Gabon) FC 105 Libreville | Free transfer | |
| 10 August 2023 | MF | (Algeria) Yuliwes Bellache | (France) Clermont Foot | Free transfer | |
| 14 August 2023 | MF | (Algeria) Ali Amriche | US Biskra | Free transfer | |
| 28 August 2023 | FW | (Tanzania) Simon Msuva | (Saudi Arabia) Al Qadsiah FC | Free transfer | |
| 10 September 2023 | DF | (Algeria) Rafik Mendes | CR Belouizdad | Free transfer | |

==== Winter ====
| Date | Pos | Player | Moving from | Fee | Source |
|---|---|---|---|---|---|
| 5 February 2024 | MF | (Mali) Mamadou Traore | (Mali) Stade Malien | Free transfer | |
| 5 February 2024 | FW | (Algeria) Jugurtha Hamroun | (Qatar) Al-Markhiya SC | Free transfer | |

=== Out ===
==== Summer ====
| Date | Pos | Player | Moving to | Fee | Source |
|---|---|---|---|---|---|
| 10 June 2023 | FW | (Burkina Faso) Lamine Ouattara | Free agent | N/A | |
| 6 July 2023 | FW | (Algeria) Redouane Zerdoum | Free agent | N/A | |
| 16 July 2023 | MF | (Algeria) Juba Oukaci | Free agent | N/A | |
| 23 July 2023 | GK | (Algeria) Abderrahmane Medjadel | Free agent | N/A | |
| 23 July 2023 | DF | (Algeria) Mohamed Guemroud | Free agent | N/A | |
| 23 July 2023 | MF | (Algeria) Lyes Benyoucef | Free agent | N/A | |
| 25 July 2023 | FW | (Algeria) Yacine Guenina | Free agent | N/A | |
| 27 July 2023 | DF | (Algeria) Fateh Talah | Free agent | N/A | |
| 31 July 2023 | GK | (Algeria) Yacine Sidi Salah | Free agent | N/A | |
| 5 August 2023 | FW | (Algeria) Mostapha Alili | Free agent | N/A | |
| 7 August 2023 | DF | (Algeria) Sabri Cheraitia | Free agent | N/A | |
| 7 August 2023 | MF | (Algeria) Noufel Ould Hamou | Free agent | N/A | |
| 8 August 2023 | MF | (Algeria) Hodeifa Arfi | Free agent | N/A | |
| 18 August 2023 | FW | (Algeria) Semir Smajlagić | Free agent | N/A | |
| 19 August 2023 | DF | (Algeria) Yassine Salhi | Free agent | N/A | |

==== Winter ====
| Date | Pos | Player | Moving to | Fee | Source |
|---|---|---|---|---|---|
| 19 December 2023 | FW | (Algeria) Hichem Mokhtar | Free agent | Free transfer (Released) | |
| 19 December 2023 | FW | (Tanzania) Simon Msuva | Free agent | Free transfer (Released) | |
| 30 January 2024 | MF | (Algeria) Salim Boukhanchouche | Free agent | Free transfer (Released) | |

=== New contracts ===
| No. | Pos | Player | Contract length | Contract end | Date | Source |
|---|---|---|---|---|---|---|
| 24 | FW | Kouceila Boualia | 3 years | 2026 | 17 July 2023 | |
| 19 | MF | Salim Boukhanchouche | 2 years | 2025 | 19 July 2023 | |
| 4 | DF | Badreddine Souyad | 2 years | 2025 | 19 July 2025 | |
| 1 | GK | Mohamed Idir Hadid | 5 years | 2028 | 19 July 2023 | |
| 2 | DF | Farès Nechat Djabri | 5 years | 2028 | 19 July 2023 | |
| 25 | DF | Khaled Bouhakak | 2 years | 2025 | 21 July 2023 | |
| 22 | DF | Oussama Gatal | 2 years | 2025 | 31 July 2023 | |

== Competitions ==
=== Overview ===
| Competition | Record | | | | | | | | Started round | Final position / round | First match | Last match |
| Competition | G | W | D | L | GF | GA | GD | Win % | Started round | Final position / round | First match | Last match |
|---|---|---|---|---|---|---|---|---|---|---|---|---|
| Ligue 1 | 30 | 10 | 12 | 8 | 33 | 27 | +6 | 33.33 | —N/a | 7th | 16 September 2023 | 14 June 2024 |
| Algerian Cup | 1 | 0 | 0 | 1 | 0 | 2 | −2 | 0.00 | Round of 64 | Round of 64 | 5 March 2024 | 5 March 2024 |
| Total | 31 | 10 | 12 | 9 | 33 | 29 | +4 | 32.26 | | | | |

Updated to match played 14 June 2024
Source: Competitions

=== Ligue 1 ===
==== League table ====
| Pos | Team | Pld | W | D | L | GF | GA | GD | Pts |
|---|---|---|---|---|---|---|---|---|---|
| 5 | ES Sétif | 30 | 14 | 6 | 10 | 37 | 37 | 0 | 48 |
| 6 | Paradou AC | 30 | 11 | 9 | 10 | 36 | 22 | +14 | 42 |
| 7 | JS Kabylie | 30 | 10 | 12 | 8 | 33 | 27 | +6 | 42 |
| 8 | ASO Chlef | 30 | 11 | 8 | 11 | 41 | 40 | +1 | 41 |
| 9 | JS Saoura | 30 | 11 | 7 | 12 | 34 | 37 | −3 | 40 |

Source: the-sports.org
Rules for classification: 1) points; 2) head-to-head points; 3) head-to-head goal difference; 4) goal difference; 5) total goals; 6) fairplay ranking; 7) playoff.

==== Results summary ====
| Overall | | | | | | | | Home | | | | | | Away | | | | | |
| Pld | W | D | L | GF | GA | GD | Pts | W | D | L | GF | GA | GD | W | D | L | GF | GA | GD |
|---|---|---|---|---|---|---|---|---|---|---|---|---|---|---|---|---|---|---|---|
| 30 | 10 | 12 | 8 | 33 | 27 | +6 | 42 | 6 | 7 | 2 | 14 | 9 | +5 | 4 | 5 | 6 | 19 | 18 | +1 |

Last updated: 14 June 2024.
Source: Competitive matches

==== Results by round ====
| Round | 1 | 2 | 3 | 4 | 5 | 6 | 7 | 8 | 9 | 10 | 11 | 12 | 13 | 14 | 15 | 16 | 17 | 18 | 19 | 20 | 21 | 22 | 23 | 24 | 25 | 26 | 27 | 28 | 29 | 30 |
|---|---|---|---|---|---|---|---|---|---|---|---|---|---|---|---|---|---|---|---|---|---|---|---|---|---|---|---|---|---|---|
| Ground | A | H | A | H | A | A | H | A | H | A | H | A | H | A | H | H | A | H | A | H | H | A | H | A | H | A | H | A | H | A |
| Result | W | D | L | W | L | L | D | W | W | L | D | D | W | L | W | W | D | D | D | L | L | L | W | W | D | D | D | D | D | W |
| Position | 4 | 4 | 7 | 6 | 10 | 12 | 13 | 9 | 8 | 9 | 11 | 11 | 9 | 10 | 8 | 7 | 7 | 6 | 8 | 8 | 9 | 11 | 7 | 7 | 7 | 7 | 7 | 8 | 8 | 7 |

Updated to match(es) played on 14 June 2024. Source: Competitive matches
A = Away; H = Home; W = Win; D = Draw; L = Loss

==== Matches ====
The league fixtures were announced on 24 August 2023.

All times are local, WAT (UTC+1).

Win Draw Loss Postponed

| 15 September 2023 Round 1 | NC Magra | 0–1 | JS Kabylie | Magra |
| 16:00 | | Report | Boukhanchouche 44' | Stadium: Boucheligue Brothers Stadium; Referee: Nabil Boukhalfa |

| 22 September 2023 Round 2 | JS Kabylie | 0–0 | Paradou AC | Tizi Ouzou |
| 19:00 | | Report | | Stadium: 1 November 1954 Stadium; Referee: Abdellah Benchehida |

| 29 September 2023 Round 3 | USM Khenchela | 2–1 | JS Kabylie | Khenchela |
| 15:45 | Baakoh 54' (pen.); Ogbi 80' (pen.) | Report | Aït-Atmane 71' | Stadium: Amar Hamam Stadium; Referee: Mustapha Ghorbal |

| 7 October 2023 Round 4 | JS Kabylie | 1–0 | USM Alger | Tizi Ouzou |
| 19:00 | Berkane 64' | Report | | Stadium: 1 November 1954 Stadium; Referee: Houssam Benyahia |

| 10 November 2023 Round 5 | ES Sétif | 1–0 | JS Kabylie | Sétif |
| 15:45 | Aggoun 90' | Report | | Stadium: 8 May 1945 Stadium; Referee: Lotfi Bekouassa |

| 19 November 2023 Round 6 | CR Belouizdad | 1–0 | JS Kabylie | Algiers |
| 19:00 | Hadded 90+2' | Report | | Stadium: Stade du 5 Juillet; Referee: Akram Mechairia |

| 25 November 2023 Round 7 | JS Kabylie | 1–1 | US Biskra | Tizi Ouzou |
| 16:45 | Adouane 43' (o.g.) | Report | Tamer 24' | Stadium: 1 November 1954 Stadium; Referee: Youcef Taieb Bouderbal |

| 2 December 2023 Round 8 | MC Oran | 1–3 | JS Kabylie | Oran |
| 18:00 | Naâmani 77' | Report | Boualia 60'; Berkane 62'; Mouaki 90+5' (pen.) | Stadium: Ahmed Zabana Stadium; Referee: Abderrahmane Sahraoui |

| 8 December 2023 Round 9 | JS Kabylie | 1–0 | ES Ben Aknoun | Tizi Ouzou |
| 18:00 | Boukhanchouche 11' | Report | | Stadium: 1 November 1954 Stadium; Referee: Yahia Dahar |

| 15 December 2023 Round 10 | CS Constantine | 2–0 | JS Kabylie | Constantine |
| 16:45 | Dib 45+4' (pen.); Belhocini 90+5' | Report | | Stadium: Chahid Hamlaoui Stadium; Referee: Anes Azrine |

| 6 January 2024 Round 12 | MC Alger | 1–1 | JS Kabylie | Algiers |
| 18:00 | Naidji 38' | Report | Matouti 89' | Stadium: Stade du 5 Juillet; Referee: Abdelmoumen Touabti |

| 13 January 2024 Round 13 | JS Kabylie | 2–1 | ASO Chlef | Tizi Ouzou |
| 16:45 | Berkane 34', 47' | Report | Souibaâh 58' | Stadium: 1 November 1954 Stadium; Referee: Akram Mechairia |

| 19 January 2024 Round 14 | JS Saoura | 3–2 | JS Kabylie | Béchar |
| 16:00 | Saâdi 69'; Benamar 90'; Bellatreche 90+10' (pen.) | Report | Mouaki 55', 63' | Stadium: 20 August 1955 Stadium; Referee: Abderrahmane Sahraoui |

| 23 January 2024 Round 11 | JS Kabylie | 0–0 | MC El Bayadh | Tizi Ouzou |
| 17:00 | | Report | | Stadium: 1 November 1954 Stadium; Referee: Rafik Aouina |

| 27 January 2024 Round 15 | JS Kabylie | 3–2 | US Souf | Tizi Ouzou |
| 16:00 | Boualia 35', 38'; Redjem 44' | Report | Belkhadem 14'; Rahmani 49' | Stadium: 1 November 1954 Stadium; Referee: Lyes Bekouassa |

| 10 February 2024 Round 16 | JS Kabylie | 1–0 | NC Magra | Tizi Ouzou |
| 16:00 | Mouaki 47' | Report | | Stadium: 1 November 1954 Stadium; Referee: Mohamed Chaoubi |

| 16 February 2024 Round 17 | Paradou AC | 0–0 | JS Kabylie | Dar El Beïda |
| 15:30 | | Report | | Stadium: Omar Benrabah Stadium; Referee: Mustapha Ghorbal |

| 24 February 2024 Round 18 | JS Kabylie | 0–0 | USM Khenchela | Tizi Ouzou |
| 16:00 | | Report | | Stadium: 1 November 1954 Stadium; Referee: Ayoub Belhachemi |

| 15 March 2024 Round 20 | JS Kabylie | 0–1 | ES Sétif | Tizi Ouzou |
| 22:00 | | Report | Lahmeri 22' | Stadium: 1 November 1954 Stadium; Referee: Abdelali Ibrir |

| 24 March 2024 Round 21 | JS Kabylie | 0–1 | CR Belouizdad | Tizi Ouzou |
| 22:00 | | Report | Bouras 88' | Stadium: 1 November 1954 Stadium; Referee: Lahlou Benbraham |

| 5 April 2024 Round 22 | US Biskra | 1–0 | JS Kabylie | Biskra |
| 22:00 | Khoualed 90+8' | Report | | Stadium: 18 February Stadium; Referee: Billel Soltani |

| 16 April 2024 Round 23 | JS Kabylie | 3–1 | MC Oran | Tizi Ouzou |
| 18:00 | Nechat 6'; Boualia 18'; Berkane 59' | Report | Boussalem 82' | Stadium: 1 November 1954 Stadium; Referee: Houssam Benyahia |

| 27 April 2024 Round 24 | ES Ben Aknoun | 2–3 | JS Kabylie | Belouizdad |
| 16:00 | Hachoud 21' (pen.); Hadji 81' | Report | Maâmeri 41' (pen.), 88' (pen.); Redjem 78' | Stadium: 20 August 1955 Stadium; Referee: Akram Mechairia |

| 6 May 2024 Round 19 | USM Alger | 2–2 | JS Kabylie | Baraki |
| 19:00 | Belkacemi 18', 42' | Report | Boualia 20'; Maâmeri 73' (pen.) | Stadium: Nelson Mandela Stadium; Referee: Mustapha Ghorbal |

| 11 May 2024 Round 25 | JS Kabylie | 0–0 | CS Constantine | Tizi Ouzou |
| 17:00 | | Report | | Stadium: 1 November 1954 Stadium; Referee: Rafik Aouina |

| 17 May 2024 Round 26 | MC El Bayadh | 1–1 | JS Kabylie | El Bayadh |
| 17:00 | Berriah 76' | Report | Maâmeri 90+6' | Stadium: Zakaria Medjdoub Stadium; Referee: Youcef Gamouh |

| 26 May 2024 Round 27 | JS Kabylie | 1–1 | MC Alger | Tizi Ouzou |
| 16:45 | Berkane 7' | Report | Merzougui 84' (pen.) | Stadium: 1 November 1954 Stadium; Referee: Fodil Oukil |

| 7 June 2024 Round 28 | ASO Chlef | 1–1 | JS Kabylie | Chlef |
| 16:45 | Addadi 12' (pen.) | Report | Maâmeri 58' | Stadium: Mohamed Boumezrag Stadium; Referee: Hamza Bouslimani |

| 11 June 2024 Round 29 | JS Kabylie | 1–1 | JS Saoura | Tizi Ouzou |
| 16:45 | Akhrib 45+3' | Report | Fettouhi 78' | Stadium: 1 November 1954 Stadium; Referee: Youcef Taieb Bouderbal |

| 14 June 2024 Round 30 | US Souf | 0–4 | JS Kabylie | El Oued |
| 16:45 | | Report | Mouaki 45+2'; Souyad 56'; Berkane 88', 90+2' | Stadium: 1 November 1954 Stadium; Referee: Mohamed Belkebir |

=== Algerian Cup ===
| 5 March 2024 Round of 64 | JS Kabylie | 0–2 | CR Belouizdad | Tizi Ouzou |
| 18:00 | | Report | Benguit 52'; Wamba 57' (pen.) | Stadium: 1 November 1954 Stadium; Referee: Nabil Boukhalfa |
Note: JS Kabylie Lineups: Hadid, Nechat, Gatal (substituted off) 76' (Traore (substituted on) 76'), Driss, Bouhakak, Amriche (substituted off) 76' (Matallah (substituted on) 76'), Boumechra, Mouaki (substituted off) 64' (Berkane (substituted on) 64'), Redjem (substituted off) 64' (Amrane (substituted on) 64'), Boualia, Matouti.

== Squad information ==
=== Playing statistics ===
| No. | Pos | Nat | Player | Total | | Ligue 1 | | Algerian Cup | |
| No. | Pos | Nat | Player | Apps | Goals | Apps | Goals | Apps | Goals |
Goalkeepers
| 1 | GK | (Algeria) ALG | Mohamed Idir Hadid | 10 | 0 | 9 | 0 | 1 | 0 |
| 14 | GK | (Algeria) ALG | Fouad Zegrar | 0 | 0 | 0 | 0 | 0 | 0 |
| 23 | GK | (Algeria) ALG | Chamseddine Rahmani | 17 | 0 | 17 | 0 | 0 | 0 |
| 40 | GK | (Algeria) ALG | Seif Benrabah | 6 | 0 | 6 | 0 | 0 | 0 |
Defenders
| 2 | DF | (Algeria) ALG | Fares Nechat Djabri | 27 | 1 | 26 | 1 | 1 | 0 |
| 4 | DF | (Algeria) ALG | Badreddine Souyad | 22 | 1 | 22 | 1 | 0 | 0 |
| 5 | DF | (Algeria) ALG | Abdelhamid Driss | 9 | 0 | 8 | 0 | 1 | 0 |
| 13 | DF | (Algeria) ALG | Moussa Benzaid | 22 | 0 | 22 | 0 | 0 | 0 |
| 22 | DF | (Algeria) ALG | Oussama Gattal | 24 | 0 | 23 | 0 | 1 | 0 |
| 25 | DF | (Algeria) ALG | Khaled Bouhakak | 22 | 0 | 21 | 0 | 1 | 0 |
| 26 | DF | (Algeria) ALG | Ahmed Maâmeri | 23 | 5 | 23 | 5 | 0 | 0 |
Midfielders
| 6 | MF | (Algeria) ALG | Aymen Bendaoud | 3 | 0 | 3 | 0 | 0 | 0 |
| 8 | MF | (Algeria) ALG | Rachid Aït-Atmane | 16 | 1 | 16 | 1 | 0 | 0 |
| 12 | MF | (Algeria) ALG | Yuliwes Bellache | 2 | 0 | 2 | 0 | 0 | 0 |
| 16 | MF | (Algeria) ALG | Ali Amriche | 26 | 0 | 25 | 0 | 1 | 0 |
| 17 | MF | (Algeria) ALG | Sid Ahmed Matallah | 21 | 0 | 20 | 0 | 1 | 0 |
| 18 | MF | (Mali) MLI | Mamadou Traore | 15 | 0 | 14 | 0 | 1 | 0 |
| 21 | MF | (Algeria) ALG | Mohamed Reda Boumechra | 16 | 0 | 15 | 0 | 1 | 0 |
| 37 | MF | (Algeria) ALG | Ayoub Abada | 1 | 0 | 1 | 0 | 0 | 0 |
| 42 | DF | (Algeria) ALG | Hamid Ourari | 0 | 0 | 0 | 0 | 0 | 0 |
Forwards
| 7 | FW | (Algeria) ALG | Massinissa Nezla | 0 | 0 | 0 | 0 | 0 | 0 |
| 9 | FW | (Gabon) GAB | Essang Matouti | 21 | 1 | 20 | 1 | 1 | 0 |
| 10 | FW | (Algeria) ALG | Adem Redjem | 29 | 1 | 28 | 1 | 1 | 0 |
| 11 | FW | (Algeria) ALG | Massinissa Nait Salem | 5 | 0 | 5 | 0 | 0 | 0 |
| 15 | FW | (Algeria) ALG | Dadi El Hocine Mouaki | 29 | 5 | 28 | 5 | 1 | 0 |
| 19 | FW | (Algeria) ALG | Jugurtha Hamroun | 4 | 0 | 4 | 0 | 0 | 0 |
| 20 | FW | (Algeria) ALG | Faik Amrane | 17 | 0 | 16 | 0 | 1 | 0 |
| 24 | FW | (Algeria) ALG | Kouceila Boualia | 26 | 5 | 25 | 5 | 1 | 0 |
| 48 | FW | (Algeria) ALG | Lahlou Akhrib | 5 | 1 | 5 | 1 | 0 | 0 |
| 56 | FW | (Algeria) ALG | Redouane Berkane | 24 | 8 | 23 | 8 | 1 | 0 |
| 59 | FW | (Algeria) ALG | Nassim Boukrou | 0 | 0 | 0 | 0 | 0 | 0 |
Players transferred out during the season
| 19 | MF | (Algeria) ALG | Salim Boukhanchouche | 13 | 2 | 13 | 2 | 0 | 0 |
| 18 | FW | (Algeria) ALG | Hichem Mokhtar | 1 | 0 | 1 | 0 | 0 | 0 |
| 27 | FW | (Tanzania) TAN | Simon Msuva | 6 | 0 | 6 | 0 | 0 | 0 |

Last updated: 14 June 2024
Source: soccerway.com

=== Goalscorers ===
Includes all competitive matches.

| No. | Nat. | Player | Pos. | L 1 | AC | TOTAL |
|---|---|---|---|---|---|---|
| 56 | (Algeria) | Redouane Berkane | FW | 8 | 0 | 8 |
| 24 | (Algeria) | Kouceila Boualia | FW | 5 | 0 | 5 |
| 26 | (Algeria) | Ahmed Maâmeri | DF | 5 | 0 | 5 |
| 15 | (Algeria) | Dadi El Hocine Mouaki | FW | 5 | 0 | 5 |
| 10 | (Algeria) | Adem Redjem | FW | 2 | 0 | 2 |
| 19 | (Algeria) | Salim Boukhanchouche | MF | 2 | 0 | 2 |
| 8 | (Algeria) | Rachid Aït-Atmane | MF | 1 | 0 | 1 |
| 9 | (Gabon) | Essang Matouti | FW | 1 | 0 | 1 |
| 2 | (Algeria) | Fares Nechat Djabri | DF | 1 | 0 | 1 |
| 48 | (Algeria) | Lahlou Akhrib | FW | 1 | 0 | 1 |
| 4 | (Algeria) | Badreddinne Souyad | DF | 1 | 0 | 1 |
| Own Goals | | | | 1 | 0 | 1 |
| Totals | | | | 33 | 0 | 33 |
