= 2025–26 USM Khenchela season =

USM Khenchela
2025–26 season
- Owner: Algérie Télécom
- President: Walid Boukrouma
- Head coach: Djilali Bahloul (from 15 July 2025) (until 11 November 2025); Mourad Okbi (from 17 November 2025) (until 19 February 2026); Billel Dziri (from 19 February 2026)
- Stadium: Amar Hamam Stadium
- Ligue 1: 7th
- Algerian Cup: Round of 32
- Top goalscorer: League: Franck Etouga (9 goals); All: Franck Etouga (9 goals)
- Biggest win: USM Khenchela 3–0 JS Saoura
- Biggest defeat: ES Sétif 4–1 USM Khenchela
Home colours	Away colours	Third colours

The 2025–26 season, was USM Khenchela's 6th season and the club's 4th consecutive season in the top flight of Algerian football. In addition to the domestic league, USM Khenchela participated in this season's editions of the Algerian Cup. The Algerian Professional Football League (LFP) officially released the calendar for the 2025–26 Ligue 1 Mobilis season on July 10, 2025.

On 20 January 2026, Algérie Télécom announced its takeover of the club.

== Squad list ==
Players and squad numbers last updated on 31 January 2026.
Note: Flags indicate national team as has been defined under FIFA eligibility rules. Players may hold more than one non-FIFA nationality.

No.	Nat.	Name	Position	Date of birth (age)	Signed from
Goalkeepers
1	(Algeria)	Abdelkader Morcely	GK	7 September 1995 (aged 29)	(Algeria) JS Saoura
16	(Algeria)	Oussama Litim	GK	3 June 1990 (aged 35)	(Algeria) MC Alger
30	(Algeria)	Yasser Zitouni	GK	3 April 2005 (aged 20)	(Algeria) USM Alger
Defenders
3	(Algeria)	Wael Guerroudja	CB	15 December 2005 (aged 19)	(Algeria) USM Alger
4	(Ivory Coast)	Serge Badjo	CB	28 December 2002 (aged 22)	(Algeria) MC Alger
5	(Algeria)	Badreddine Souyad	CB	3 May 1995 (aged 30)	(Algeria) CR Belouizdad
12	(Algeria)	Zineddine Meddour	CB	7 February 2004 (aged 21)	(Algeria) Reserve team
15	(Algeria)	Nabil Lamara	LB	15 August 1993 (aged 32)	Unattached
19	(Algeria)	Abdelhamid Dris	CB	12 February 2002 (aged 23)	(Algeria) JS Kabylie
22	(Algeria)	Mohamed Guemroud	RB	28 August 1994 (aged 30)	(Algeria) JS Kabylie
Midfielders
6	(Algeria)	Ahmida Zenasni	DM	10 July 1993 (aged 32)	(Algeria) ASO Chlef
7	(Algeria)	Hadji Chekal Affari	CM	24 February 2003 (aged 22)	(Algeria) JS Kabylie
8	(Algeria)	Abdelhakim Sameur (C.)	DM	12 November 1990 (aged 34)	(Algeria) US Biskra
11	(Algeria)	Mohamed Islam Bakir	CM	13 July 1996 (aged 29)	(Algeria) CR Belouizdad
25	(Algeria)	Aymen Bendaoud	DM	18 June 2001 (aged 24)	(Algeria) JS Kabylie
26	(Algeria)	Mohamed Reda Boumechra	AM	3 June 1997 (aged 28)	(Algeria) JS Kabylie
Forwards
9	(Algeria)	Abdelhak Askar	LW	15 December 1997 (aged 27)	(Algeria) ES Mostaganem
10	(Algeria)	Ammar Oukil	RW	7 July 1996 (aged 29)	(Algeria) Olympique Akbou
17	(Algeria)	Ayoub Kabouche	ST	9 June 2005 (aged 20)	(Algeria) Reserve team
20	(Algeria)	Ishak Boussouf	RW	August 22, 2001 (aged 23)	(Algeria) MC Alger
21	(Cameroon)	Franck Etouga	ST	18 September 2001 (aged 23)	(Egypt) Haras El Hodoud
23	(Gabon)	Edlin Essang-Matouti	ST	25 July 2003 (aged 22)	(Bahrain) Al-Najma SC
24	(Algeria)	Adem Aichouche	ST	13 May 2005 (aged 20)	(Algeria) ES Mostaganem
27	(Algeria)	Hamid Djaouchi	ST	19 December 1994 (aged 30)	(Saudi Arabia) Al-Diriyah Club

== Transfers ==
=== In ===
==== Summer ====
Date	Pos	Player	Moving from	Fee	Source
14 July 2025	GK	(Algeria) Abdelkader Morcely	JS Saoura	Free transfer	
15 July 2025	ST	(Gabon) Edlin Randy Essang-Matouti	(Bahrain) Al-Najma SC	Free transfer	
21 July 2025	ST	(Cameroon) Franck Etouga	(Egypt) Haras El Hodoud	Free transfer	
6 August 2025	LB	(Algeria) Mohamed Ezzemani	ES Mostaganem	Free transfer	
21 August 2025	CB	(Algeria) Badreddine Souyad	CR Belouizdad	Free transfer	
21 August 2025	CB	(Algeria) Abdelhamid Dris	JS Kabylie	Free transfer	
23 August 2025	CB	(Ivory Coast) Serge Badjo	MC Alger	Free transfer	
24 August 2025	CM	(Algeria) Hadji Chekal Affari	JS Kabylie	Free transfer	
31 August 2025	DM	(Algeria) Aymen Bendaoud	JS Kabylie	Free transfer	

==== Winter ====
Date	Pos	Player	Moving from	Fee	Source
25 January 2026	LW	(Algeria) Abdelhak Askar	ES Mostaganem	Free transfer	
31 January 2026	ST	(Algeria) Adem Aichouche	ES Mostaganem	Free transfer	
31 January 2026	RW	(Algeria) Ishak Boussouf	Unattached	Free transfer	
31 January 2026	LB	(Algeria) Nabil Lamara	Unattached	Free transfer	

=== Out ===
==== Summer ====
Date	Pos	Player	Moving to	Fee	Source
7 July 2025	DF	(Algeria) Oussama Kaddour	MC Oran	Free transfer	
20 August 2025	DM	(Algeria) Badreddine Touki	MB Rouissat	Free transfer	

==== Winter ====
Date	Pos	Player	Moving to	Fee	Source
25 January 2026	DM	(Democratic Republic of the Congo) Christopher Ngolo	Unattached	Free transfer (Released)	
25 January 2026	LB	(Algeria) Mohamed Ezzemani	Unattached	Free transfer (Released)	
31 January 2026	CM	(Algeria) Samir Aiboud	ASO Chlef	Free transfer	

== Competitions ==
=== Overview ===
Competition	Record								Started round	Final position / round	First match	Last match
Competition	G	W	D	L	GF	GA	GD	Win %	Started round	Final position / round	First match	Last match
Ligue 1	30	12	8	10	37	37	+0	40.00	—N/a	7th	23 August 2025	5 June 2026
Algerian Cup	2	1	0	1	2	2	+0	50.00	Round of 64	Round of 32	5 December 2025	13 December 2025
Total	32	13	8	11	39	39	+0	40.63				

Updated to match played 5 June 2026
Source: Competitions

=== Ligue 1 ===
==== League table ====
Pos	Team	Pld	W	D	L	GF	GA	GD	Pts
5	JS Kabylie	30	11	12	7	40	31	+9	45
6	Olympique Akbou	30	12	9	9	34	31	+3	45
7	USM Khenchela	30	12	8	10	37	37	0	44
8	ES Ben Aknoun	30	11	10	9	41	39	+2	43
9	CS Constantine	30	11	10	9	35	30	+5	43

Source: lfp.dz
Rules for classification: 1) Points; 2) Head-to-head points; 3) Head-to-head goal difference; 4) First half goal difference; 5) First half total goals; 6) Fairplay ranking; 7) Playoff.

==== Results summary ====
Overall								Home						Away					
Pld	W	D	L	GF	GA	GD	Pts	W	D	L	GF	GA	GD	W	D	L	GF	GA	GD
30	12	8	10	37	37	0	44	8	5	2	19	10	+9	4	3	8	18	27	−9

Last updated: 5 June 2026.
Source: Competitive matches

==== Results by round ====
Round	1	2	3	4	5	6	7	8	9	10	11	12	13	14	15	16	17	18	19	20	21	22	23	24	25	26	27	28	29	30
Ground	H	A	H	A	H	A	H	A	H	A	H	H	A	H	A	A	H	A	H	A	H	A	H	A	H	A	A	H	A	H
Result	D	W	D	D	D	D	W	L	L	L	W	W	W	D	L	L	D	L	W	W	L	L	W	L	W	W	L	W	D	W
Position	8	3	6	9	8	8	4	8	11	11	10	6	6	7	9	11	11	11	11	8	9	10	9	10	9	9	9	8	9	7

Updated to match(es) played on 5 June 2026. Source: Competitive matches
A = Away; H = Home; W = Win; D = Draw; L = Loss

==== Matches ====
The league fixtures were announced on 31 July 2025.

All times are local, WAT (UTC+1).

Win Draw Loss Postponed

23 August 2025 Round 1	USM Khenchela	1–1	ES Sétif	Khenchela
17:00	Bakir 20'	Soccerway; LFP	Hamidi 41'	Stadium: Amar Hamam Stadium; Referee: Rafik Aouina

30 August 2025 Round 2	ASO Chlef	1–2	USM Khenchela	Chlef
19:00	Sadahine 59'	Soccerway; LFP	Driss 24'; Djaouchi 90+7'	Stadium: Mohamed Boumezrag Stadium; Referee: Tayeb Benyabka

6 September 2025 Round 3	USM Khenchela	1–1	CR Belouizdad	Khenchela
17:00	Chekal 33'	Soccerway; LFP	Ben Hammouda 72'	Stadium: Amar Hamam Stadium; Referee: Ayoub Belhachemi

13 September 2025 Round 4	USM Alger	1–1	USM Khenchela	Blida
19:00	Guenaoui 75'	Soccerway; LFP	Bakir 45+3'	Stadium: Mustapha Tchaker Stadium; Attendance: 6.000; Referee: Mohamed Bouteraa; VAR: Anes Azrine
Note: USM Alger played on September 13, 2025, at 7:00 p.m. against USM Khenchela, as part of Matchday 4 of Ligue 1 Mobilis, at the Mustapha Tchaker Stadium in Blida, with the exclusive presence of 6,000 USMA supporters.

20 September 2025 Round 5	USM Khenchela	1–1	ES Ben Aknoun	Khenchela
16:00	Boumechra 61'	Soccerway; LFP	Hachoud 85'	Stadium: Amar Hamam Stadium; Referee: Tahar Boudjemaa

28 September 2025 Round 6	Olympique Akbou	1–1	USM Khenchela	Béjaïa
16:00	Zamoum 28'	Soccerway; LFP	Matouti 32'	Stadium: Maghrebi Unity Stadium; Referee: Abdelali Ibrir

4 October 2025 Round 7	USM Khenchela	2–0	MC Oran	Khenchela
15:00	Ezzemani 58'; Chekal 66'	Soccerway; LFP		Stadium: Amar Hamam Stadium; Referee: Anes Azrine

21 October 2025 Round 8	JS Kabylie	1–0	USM Khenchela	Tizi Ouzou
19:00	Bott 87'	Soccerway; LFP		Stadium: Hocine Aït Ahmed Stadium; Referee: Mustapha Ghorbal

30 October 2025 Round 9	USM Khenchela	0–1	MC Alger	Khenchela
15:00		Soccerway; LFP	Bayazid 37'	Stadium: Amar Hamam Stadium; Referee: Alaa Bouab

3 November 2025 Round 10	Paradou AC	2–0	USM Khenchela	Belouizdad
14:30	Soukkou 11'; Abdelkader 42'	Soccerway; LFP		Stadium: 20 August 1955 Stadium; Referee: Yahia Dahar

8 November 2025 Round 11	USM Khenchela	1–0	ES Mostaganem	Khenchela
14:30	Etouga 15'	Soccerway; LFP		Stadium: Amar Hamam Stadium; Referee: Lotfi Bekouassa

22 November 2025 Round 12	USM Khenchela	3–0	JS Saoura	Khenchela
14:00	Oukil 33'; Boumechra 76', 79'	Soccerway; LFP		Stadium: Amar Hamam Stadium; Referee: Tahar Boudjemaa

19 December 2025 Round 13	MC El Bayadh	1–2	USM Khenchela	El Bayadh
14:30	El Orfi 87' (pen.)	Soccerway; LFP	Etouga 41', 71'	Stadium: Zakaria Medjdoub Stadium; Referee: Youcef Tayeb Bouderbal

26 December 2025 Round 14	USM Khenchela	0–0	CS Constantine	Khenchela
15:00		Soccerway; LFP		Stadium: Amar Hamam Stadium; Referee: Ayoub Belhachemi

9 January 2026 Round 15	MB Rouissat	2–0	USM Khenchela	Ouargla
16:00	Rahmani 39'; Benzid 45+4' (pen.)	Soccerway; LFP		Stadium: 18 February Stadium; Referee: Lotfi Bekouassa

23 January 2026 Round 16	ES Sétif	4–1	USM Khenchela	Sétif
18:00	Djahnit 2'; Hamidi 8'; Zerrouki 41'; Toual 62'	Soccerway; LFP	Bakir 50'	Stadium: 8 May 1945 Stadium; Referee: Nabil Boukhalfa

4 February 2026 Round 17	USM Khenchela	2–2	ASO Chlef	Khenchela
15:00	Djaouchi 20'; Chekal 62'	Soccerway; LFP	Farhi 11'; Ledlum 49'	Stadium: Amar Hamam Stadium; Referee: Youcef Tayeb Bouderbal

21 February 2026 Round 20	ES Ben Aknoun	2–3	USM Khenchela	Belouizdad
14:30	Lakehal 90'; Djabout 90+6'	Soccerway; LFP	Boumechra 56'; Etouga 59'; Djaouchi 90+4'	Stadium: 20 August 1955 Stadium; Referee: Rafik Aouina

28 February 2026 Round 21	USM Khenchela	0–1	Olympique Akbou	Khenchela
14:30		Soccerway; LFP	Labidi 53'	Stadium: Amar Hamam Stadium; Referee: Anes Azrine

6 March 2026 Round 22	MC Oran	2–1	USM Khenchela	Bir El Djir
22:00	Aliane 87'; Bourdim 90+2'	Soccerway; LFP	Etouga 24'	Stadium: Miloud Hadefi Stadium; Referee: Lahlou Benbraham

13 March 2026 Round 23	USM Khenchela	2–1	JS Kabylie	Khenchela
15:15	Matouti 45+3', 72'	Soccerway; LFP	Messaoudi 45'	Stadium: Amar Hamam Stadium; Referee: Tayeb Benyebka

17 March 2026 Round 24	MC Alger	2–1	USM Khenchela	Douéra
22:00	Menezla 87'; Ghezala 90+7' (pen.)	Soccerway; LFP	Bakir 45+1'	Stadium: Ali La Pointe Stadium; Referee: Houssam Benyahia

4 April 2026 Round 25	USM Khenchela	1–0	Paradou AC	Khenchela
16:00	Matouti 41'	Soccerway; LFP		Stadium: Amar Hamam Stadium; Referee: Alaa Bouab

10 April 2026 Round 26	ES Mostaganem	0–3	USM Khenchela	Mostaganem
16:00		Soccerway; LFP	Askar 22'; Matouti 39'; Boumechra 51'	Stadium: Mohamed Bensaïd Stadium; Referee: Youcef Abane

17 April 2026 Round 27	JS Saoura	3–0	USM Khenchela	Béchar
17:45	Wayou 45+1'; Saadi 54'; Fettouhi 85'	Soccerway; LFP		Stadium: 20 August 1955 Stadium; Referee: Lotfi Bekouassa

4 May 2026 Round 18	CR Belouizdad	3–1	USM Khenchela	Baraki
17:45	Meziane 25'; Benguit 35' (pen.); Boukhanchouche 49'	Soccerway; LFP	Etouga 42'	Stadium: Nelson Mandela Stadium; Referee: Mustapha Ghorbal

8 May 2026 Round 28	USM Khenchela	2–1	MC El Bayadh	Khenchela
16:00	Etouga 32'; Matouti 90+2'	Soccerway; LFP	Benyahia 54'	Stadium: Amar Hamam Stadium; Referee: Mohamed Guerid

19 May 2026 Round 29	CS Constantine	2–2	USM Khenchela	Constantine
17:45	L'Ghoul 14', 22'	Soccerway; LFP	Driss 7'; Etouga 23'	Stadium: Chahid Hamlaoui Stadium; Referee: Ayoub Belhachemi

25 May 2026 Round 19	USM Khenchela	2–1	USM Alger	Khenchela
16:00	Etouga 9'; Chekal 39'	Soccerway; LFP	Draoui 42' (pen.)	Stadium: Amar Hamam Stadium; Referee: Naïm Bouara

5 June 2026 Round 30	USM Khenchela	1–0	MB Rouissat	Khenchela
17:00	Djaouchi 75'	Soccerway; LFP		Stadium: Amar Hamam Stadium; Referee: Abdelkarim Houmer

=== Algerian Cup ===
5 December 2025 Round of 64	USM Khenchela	1–0	MB Rouissat	Khenchela
14:30	Oukil 15'	Report		Stadium: Amar Hamam Stadium; Referee: Youcef Gamouh

13 December 2025 Round of 32	MC Alger	2–0	USM Khenchela	Douéra
17:00	Messoussa 6'; Bayazid 49'	Report	Djaouchi 11'	Stadium: Ali La Pointe Stadium; Referee: Yahia Dahar

== Squad information ==
=== Appearances and goals ===
As of 5 June 2026

No.	Pos	Player	Nat	Ligue 1			Algerian Cup			Total		
No.	Pos	Player	Nat	App	St	G	App	St	G	App	St	G
Goalkeepers
1	GK	Abdelkader Morcely	(Algeria)	6	5	0	0	0	0	6	5	0
16	GK	Oussama Litim	(Algeria)	24	24	0	2	2	0	26	26	0
30	GK	Yasser Zitouni	(Algeria)	2	1	0	0	0	0	2	1	0
Defenders
3	CB	Wael Guerroudja	(Algeria)	4	2	0	0	0	0	4	2	0
4	CB	Serge Badjo	(Ivory Coast)	15	12	0	0	0	0	15	12	0
5	CB	Badreddine Souyad	(Algeria)	20	18	0	2	2	0	22	20	0
12	CB	Zineddine Meddour	(Algeria)	13	4	0	0	0	0	13	4	0
15	LB	Nabil Lamara	(Algeria)	2	0	0	0	0	0	2	0	0
19	CB	Abdelhamid Dris	(Algeria)	28	28	2	2	2	0	30	30	2
22	RB	Mohamed Guemroud	(Algeria)	29	28	0	2	2	0	31	30	0
Midfielders
6	DM	Ahmida Zenasni	(Algeria)	17	11	0	2	2	0	19	13	0
7	CM	Hadji Chekal Affari	(Algeria)	27	24	4	2	0	0	29	24	4
8	DM	Abdelhakim Sameur	(Algeria)	20	5	0	2	1	0	22	6	0
11	CM	Mohamed Islam Bakir	(Algeria)	29	25	4	2	0	0	31	25	4
25	DM	Aymen Bendaoud	(Algeria)	26	22	0	2	2	0	28	24	0
26	AM	Mohamed Reda Boumechra	(Algeria)	25	23	5	2	1	0	27	24	5
Forwards
9	LW	Abdelhak Askar	(Algeria)	14	14	1	0	0	0	14	14	1
10	RW	Ammar Oukil	(Algeria)	29	15	1	2	2	1	31	17	2
17	ST	Ayoub Kabouche	(Algeria)	4	0	0	0	0	0	4	0	0
20	RW	Ishak Boussouf	(Algeria)	1	0	0	0	0	0	1	0	0
21	ST	Franck Etouga	(Cameroon)	29	17	9	2	0	0	31	17	9
23	ST	Edlin Essang-Matouti	(Rwanda)	26	22	6	2	2	0	28	24	6
24	ST	Adem Aichouche	(Algeria)	0	0	0	0	0	0	0	0	0
27	ST	Hamid Djaouchi	(Algeria)	29	16	4	2	2	1	31	18	5
Players transferred out during the season
~~9~~	LW	Abdelkader Ghorab	(Algeria)	1	0	0	0	0	0	1	0	0
~~14~~	DM	Christopher Ngolo	(Democratic Republic of the Congo)	5	0	0	0	0	0	5	0	0
~~13~~	LB	Mohamed Ezzemani	(Algeria)	14	13	1	2	2	0	16	15	1
~~20~~	CM	Samir Aiboud	(Algeria)	9	2	0	1	0	0	10	2	0
Total				30		37	2		2	32		39

Last updated: 5 June 2026
Source: soccerway.com

=== Goalscorers ===
As of 5 June 2026

Includes all competitive matches.

No.	Nat.	Player	Pos.	L1	AC	TOTAL
21	(Cameroon)	Franck Etouga	ST	9	0	9
23	(Rwanda)	Edlin Essang-Matouti	ST	6	0	6
26	(Algeria)	Mohamed Reda Boumechra	AM	5	0	5
27	(Algeria)	Hamid Djaouchi	ST	4	1	5
11	(Algeria)	Mohamed Islam Bakir	CM	4	0	4
7	(Algeria)	Hadji Chekal Affari	CM	4	0	4
10	(Algeria)	Ammar Oukil	RW	1	1	2
5	(Algeria)	Abdelhamid Dris	CB	2	0	2
9	(Algeria)	Abdelhak Askar	LW	1	0	1
Players transferred out during the season
~~13~~	(Algeria)	Mohamed Ezzemani	LB	1	0	1
Own Goals				0	0	0
Totals				37	2	39

=== Clean sheets ===
As of 5 June 2026

Includes all competitive matches.

					Clean sheets		
No.	Nat	Name	GP	GA	L1	AC	Total
1	(Algeria)	Abdelkader Morcely	6	13	0	0	0
16	(Algeria)	Oussama Litim	26	24	8	1	9
30	(Algeria)	Yasser Zitouni	2	2	0	0	0
		TOTALS		39	8	1	9
