= Kouceila Boualia =

Algerian footballer (born 2001)

Kouceila Boualia ⴽⵓⵙⴰⵢⵍⴰ ⴱⵓⴰⵍⵢⴰ
Personal information
- Date of birth: 14 March 2001 (age 25)
- Place of birth: Aïn El Hammam, Algeria
- Height: 1.77 m (5 ft 10 in)
- Position: Right winger

Team information
- Current team: CR Belouizdad
- Number: 12

Youth career
- JS Azazga
- JS Kabylie

Senior career*
Years	Team	Apps	(Gls)
2020–2025	JS Kabylie	97	(17)
2025–2026	Espérance de Tunis	23	(8)
2026–	CR Belouizdad	0	(0)

International career
2022–2023	Algeria U23	5	(0)
2021–2025	Algeria A'	3	(0)
- * Club domestic league appearances and goals as of 15 August 2026

Kouceila Boualia (Arabic: كسيلة بوعالية; Tamazight: ⴽⵓⵙⴰⵢⵍⴰ ⴱⵓⴰⵍⵢⴰ; born 14 March 2001) is an Algerian professional footballer who plays as a right winger for Algerian Ligue Professionnelle 1 club CR Belouizdad.

== Career ==
Boualia was born in Aïn El Hammam, Kabylia. In August 2021, he signed a four-year contract with JS Kabylie. In October 2021, Boualia tore his ACL in a pre-season friendly match. On 25 August 2026, he joined Tunisian club ES Tunis. On 15 August 2026, he joined CR Belouizdad.

== Career statistics ==
As of 31 May 2026

Appearances and goals by club, season and competition
Club	Season	League			National cup (Note: Includes Algerian Cup and Tunisian Cup)		League cup (Note: Includes Algerian League Cup)		Continental		Other		Total	
Club	Season	Division	Apps	Goals	Apps	Goals	Apps	Goals	Apps	Goals	Apps	Goals	Apps	Goals
JS Kabylie	2020–21	Algerian Ligue 1	23	1	0	0	4	2	6 (Note: Appearances in CAF Confederation Cup)	1	—		33	4
JS Kabylie	2021–22	Algerian Ligue 1	0	0	0	0	—		0	0	—		0	0
JS Kabylie	2022–23	Algerian Ligue 1	24	6	0	0	—		7 (Note: Appearances in CAF Champions League)	0	—		31	6
JS Kabylie	2023–24	Algerian Ligue 1	25	5	1	0	—		—		—		26	5
JS Kabylie	2024–25	Algerian Ligue 1	25	5	2	0	—		—		—		27	5
JS Kabylie	Total		97	17	3	0	4	2	13	1	—		117	20
Espérance de Tunis	2025–26	Tunisian Ligue 1	23	8	2	1	—		14	2	—		39	11
CR Belouizdad	2026–27	Algerian Ligue 1	0	0	0	0	—		0	0	—		0	0
Career total			120	25	5	1	5	2	26	3	0	0	156	31

== Honours ==
JS Kabylie

- Algerian League Cup: 2020–21
- CAF Confederation Cup runner-up: 2020–21

Espérance de Tunis

- Tunisian Cup: 2025–26

Individual

- Algerian Ligue Professionnelle 1 Player of the Month: May 2023
