= 2026–27 CR Belouizdad season =

CR Belouizdad
2026–27 season
- Owner: MADAR Holding
- President: Mohamed Arar
- Head coach: Nabil Maâloul (from 2 July 2026)
- Stadium: Nelson Mandela Stadium
- Ligue 1: 2nd
- Algerian Cup: Round of 64
- Confederation Cup: Second round

The 2026–27 season, is CR Belouizdad's 60th season and the club's 37th consecutive season in the top flight of Algerian football. In addition to the domestic league, CR Belouizdad are participating in this season's editions of the Algerian Cup and the Confederation Cup.

== Squad list ==
Players and squad numbers last updated on 8 October 2026.
Note: Flags indicate national team as has been defined under FIFA eligibility rules. Players may hold more than one non-FIFA nationality.

No.	Nat.	Name	Position	Date of Birth (Age)	Signed from
Goalkeepers
1	(Algeria)	Tarek Bousseder	GK	28 November 2000 (aged 25)	(Algeria) ES Sétif
16	(Algeria)	Anes Mokhtar	GK	28 February 2005 (aged 21)	(Algeria) Youth system
30	(Algeria)	Farid Chaâl	GK	3 July 1994 (aged 32)	(Saudi Arabia) Al-Najma SC
Defenders
2	(Algeria)	Chouaib Keddad	CB	25 July 1994 (aged 32)	(Algeria) ASO Chlef
3	(Algeria)	Houcine Benayada	RB	8 August 1992 (aged 34)	(Morocco) Wydad AC
4	(Algeria)	Riyane Akacem	CB	13 February 1999 (aged 27)	(Algeria) JS Saoura
13	(Algeria)	Haithem Elkouacheur	CB	3 January 2007 (aged 19)	(Algeria) Youth system
15	(Algeria)	Benahmed Bendahmane	CB	9 May 2006 (aged 20)	(Algeria) Youth system
17	(Algeria)	Yasser Chelfaoui	LB	14 December 1996 (aged 29)	(Algeria) Olympique Akbou
21	(Algeria)	Youcef Laouafi	CB	1 January 1996 (aged 30)	(Tunisia) ES Sahel
22	(Algeria)	Fouad Kermiche	RB	11 July 1999 (aged 27)	(Algeria) Paradou AC
23	(Algeria)	Sofiane Bouchar	CB	21 May 1994 (aged 32)	(Kuwait) Qadsia SC
Midfielders
5	(Algeria)	Abdelmalek Kelaleche	AM	26 July 2005 (aged 21)	(Algeria) MC Alger
6	(Algeria)	Mehdi Boudjemaa	CM	7 April 1998 (aged 28)	(Saudi Arabia) Al Wehda
8	(Tunisia)	Houssem Tka	CM	16 August 2000 (aged 25)	(Tunisia) ES Tunis
14	(Republic of the Congo)	Julio Bandessi	AM	2 July 2004 (aged 22)	(Algeria) MB Rouissat
18	(Algeria)	Salim Boukhanchouche	DM	6 October 1991 (aged 34)	(Algeria) USM Alger
19	(Algeria)	Abdelaziz Kahia	AM	9 April 2006 (aged 20)	(Algeria) Youth system
27	(Algeria)	Djaber Kaâssis	CM	3 May 1999 (aged 27)	(Algeria) Paradou AC
29	(Algeria)	Bilal Boukerchaoui	CM	15 February 2003 (aged 23)	(Algeria) Youth system
Forwards
7	(Cameroon)	Franck Etouga	ST	18 September 2001 (aged 24)	(Algeria) USM Khenchela
9	(Algeria)	Lofti Boussouar	ST	1 September 2004 (aged 21)	(Algeria) Youth system
10	(Algeria)	Farid El Melali	LW	13 July 1997 (aged 29)	(France) Angers SCO
11	(Algeria)	Abderrahmane Meziane	LW	7 March 1994 (aged 32)	(Algeria) USM Alger
12	(Algeria)	Kouceila Boualia	RW	14 March 2001 (aged 25)	(Tunisia) ES Tunis
20	(Tunisia)	Mohamed Ali Ben Hammouda	ST	24 July 1998 (aged 28)	(Egypt) Ghazl El Mahalla
26	(Algeria)	Yousri Bouzok	RW	18 August 1996 (aged 30)	(Algeria) Al Raed

== Transfers ==
=== In ===
==== Summer ====
Date	Pos	Player	Moving from	Fee	Source
27 June 2026	CB	(Algeria) Sofiane Bouchar	(Kuwait) Qadsia SC	Free transfer	
27 June 2026	LB	(Algeria) Yasser Chelfaoui	Olympique Akbou	Free transfer	
27 June 2026	RB	(Algeria) Fouad Kermiche	Paradou AC	Free transfer	
27 June 2026	CB	(Algeria) Riyane Akacem	JS Saoura	Undisclosed	
27 June 2026	AM	(Republic of the Congo) Julio Bandessi	MB Rouissat	Undisclosed	
30 June 2026	CM	(Tunisia) Houssem Tka	(Tunisia) ES Tunis	Free transfer	
7 July 2026	RW	(Algeria) Yousri Bouzok	(Saudi Arabia) Al Raed	Free transfer	
10 July 2026	ST	(Cameroon) Franck Etouga	USM Khenchela	Free transfer	
10 July 2026	CM	(Algeria) Mehdi Boudjemaa	(Saudi Arabia) Al Wehda	Free transfer	
15 August 2026	RW	(Algeria) Kouceila Boualia	(Tunisia) ES Tunis	Free transfer	

=== Out ===
==== Summer ====
Date	Pos	Player	Moving to	Fee	Source
15 June 2026	LW	(Algeria) Mohamed Islam Belkhir	ES Sétif	Free transfer	
24 June 2026	LW	(Algeria) Islam Abbaci	Unattached	Free transfer (Released)	
24 June 2026	CM	(Algeria) Necer Benzid	Unattached	Free transfer (Released)	
24 June 2026	CB	(Algeria) Abderrahmane Bekkour	Unattached	Free transfer (Released)	
24 June 2026	CB	(Algeria) Younes Ouassa	Unattached	Free transfer (Released)	
9 July 2026	AM	(Ivory Coast) Jean Charles Ahoua	Unattached	Free transfer (Released)	
30 July 2026	RW	(Algeria) Abdennour Belhocini	JS Kabylie	Undisclosed	
5 August 2026	DM	(Algeria) Mohamed Mahi	MB Rouissat	Free transfer	
6 October 2026	LB	(Algeria) Naoufel Khacef	(Libya) Al Ahly SC	120000000 DA	

== Competitions ==
=== Overview ===
Competition	Record								Started round	Final position / round	First match	Last match
Competition	G	W	D	L	GF	GA	GD	Win %	Started round	Final position / round	First match	Last match
Ligue 1	9	6	2	1	13	8	+5	66.67	—N/a	To be confirmed	5 September 2026	In Progress
Algerian Cup	0	0	0	0	0	0	+0	—	Round of 64	To be confirmed	December 2026	In Progress
Confederation Cup	0	0	0	0	0	0	+0	—	Second round	To be confirmed	October 2026	In Progress
Total	9	6	2	1	13	8	+5	66.67				

Updated to match played 19 November 2026
Source: Competitions

=== Ligue 1 ===
==== League table ====
Pos	Team	Pld	W	D	L	GF	GA	GD	Pts	Qualification or relegation
1	JS Kabylie	9	6	2	1	13	3	+10	20	Qualification for CAF Champions League
2	CR Belouizdad	9	6	2	1	13	8	+5	20	Qualification for CAF Champions League
3	MB Rouissat	10	5	3	2	10	6	+4	18	Qualification for CAF Confederation Cup
4	MC Alger	8	5	1	2	9	3	+6	16	
5	Olympique Akbou	9	4	3	2	10	6	+4	15	

Updated to match(es) played on 19 November 2026. Source: lfp.dz
Rules for classification: 1) Points; 2) Head-to-head points; 3) Head-to-head goal difference; 4) First half goal difference; 5) First half total goals; 6) Fairplay ranking; 7) Playoff.

==== Results summary ====
Overall								Home						Away					
Pld	W	D	L	GF	GA	GD	Pts	W	D	L	GF	GA	GD	W	D	L	GF	GA	GD
9	6	2	1	13	8	+5	20	3	0	0	3	0	+3	3	2	1	10	8	+2

Last updated: 19 November 2026.
Source: Competitive matches

==== Results by round ====
Round	1	2	3	4	5	6	7	8	9	10	11	12	13	14	15	16	17	18	19	20	21	22	23	24	25	26	27	28	29	30
Ground	A	H	A	H	A	H	A	H	A	A	H	A	H	A	H	H	A	H	A	H	A	H	A	H	H	A	H	A	H	A
Result	D	W	W	W	W		D	W	W	L																				
Position	6																													

Updated to match(es) played on 19 November 2026. Source: Competitive matches
A = Away; H = Home; W = Win; D = Draw; L = Loss

==== Matches ====
The league fixtures were announced on 3 August 2026.

All times are local, WAT (UTC+1).

Win Draw Loss Postponed

5 September 2026 Round 1	ASO Chlef	3–3	CR Belouizdad	Chlef
21:00	Motrani 1', 6'; Bekkouche 71'	Flashscore; LFP	Kaâssis 13'; Debbari 20' (o.g.); Etouga 42'	Stadium: Mohamed Boumezrag Stadium; Referee: Abdennour Khalfallah

11 September 2026 Round 2	CR Belouizdad	1–0	ES Sétif	Algiers
21:00	Bouzok 82' (pen.)	Flashscore; LFP		Stadium: Stade du 5 Juillet; Referee: Youcef Taieb Bouderbal

17 September 2026 Round 3	US Biskra	0–1	CR Belouizdad	Zeribet El Oued
18:00		Flashscore; LFP	Boukhanchouche 78'	Stadium: Bouhafs Chabi Stadium; Referee: Akram Mechairia

7 October 2026 Round 4	CR Belouizdad	1–0	USM Khenchela	Algiers
20:00	Benayada 90+7' (pen.)	Flashscore; LFP		Stadium: Stade du 5 Juillet; Referee: Tayeb Benyabka

12 October 2026 Round 5	JS El Biar	2–3	CR Belouizdad	Dar El Beïda
15:00	Ben Hammouda 1'; Boualia 37'; El Melali 69'	Flashscore; LFP	Aribi 11', 56'	Stadium: Omar Benrabah Stadium; Referee: Lotfi Bekouassa

24 October 2026 Round 7	USM Alger	2–2	CR Belouizdad	Algiers
17:45	Ramdaoui 45+10' (pen.); Khaldi 57' (pen.)	Flashscore; LFP	Ben Hammouda 8' (pen.), 28'	Stadium: Stade du 5 Juillet; Referee: Mustapha Ghorbal

2 November 2026 Round 8	CR Belouizdad	1–0	JS Saoura	Algiers
20:00	Ben Hammouda 50' (pen.)	Flashscore; LFP		Stadium: Stade du 5 Juillet; Referee: Ayoub Belhachemi

8 November 2026 Round 9	ES Ben Aknoun	0–1	CR Belouizdad	Belouizdad
17:45		Flashscore; LFP	Benayada 51'	Stadium: 20 August 1955 Stadium; Referee: Tayeb Benyabka

19 November 2026 Round 10	MB Rouissat	1–0	CR Belouizdad	Ouargla
17:45	Salem 60'	Flashscore; LFP		Stadium: 18 February Stadium; Referee: Naïm Bouara

Round 6	CR Belouizdad	–	Olympique Akbou	Baraki
:		Flashscore; LFP		Stadium: Nelson Mandela Stadium

Round 11	CR Belouizdad	–	CS Constantine	Baraki
:		Flashscore; LFP		Stadium: Nelson Mandela Stadium

Round 12	MC Oran	–	CR Belouizdad	Bir El Djir
		Flashscore; LFP		Stadium: Miloud Hadefi Stadium

Round 13	CR Belouizdad	–	JS Kabylie	Baraki
:		Flashscore; LFP		Stadium: Nelson Mandela Stadium

Round 14	MC Alger	–	CR Belouizdad	Douéra
:		Flashscore; LFP		Stadium: Ali La Pointe Stadium

Round 15	CR Belouizdad	–	CR Témouchent	Baraki
:		Flashscore; LFP		Stadium: Nelson Mandela Stadium

Round 16	CR Belouizdad	–	ASO Chlef	Baraki
:		Flashscore; LFP		Stadium: Nelson Mandela Stadium

Round 17	ES Sétif	–	CR Belouizdad	Sétif
:		Flashscore; LFP		Stadium: 8 May 1945 Stadium

Round 18	CR Belouizdad	–	US Biskra	Baraki
:		Flashscore; LFP		Stadium: Nelson Mandela Stadium

Round 19	USM Khenchela	–	CR Belouizdad	Khenchela
:		Flashscore; LFP		Stadium: Amar Hamam Stadium

Round 20	CR Belouizdad	–	JS El Biar	Baraki
:		Flashscore; LFP		Stadium: Nelson Mandela Stadium

Round 21	Olympique Akbou	–	CR Belouizdad	Akbou
:		Flashscore; LFP		Stadium: Martyrs Stadium

Round 22	CR Belouizdad	–	USM Alger	Baraki
:		Flashscore; LFP		Stadium: Nelson Mandela Stadium

Round 23	JS Saoura	–	CR Belouizdad	Béchar
:		Flashscore; LFP		Stadium: 20 August 1955 Stadium

Round 24	CR Belouizdad	–	ES Ben Aknoun	Baraki
:		Flashscore; LFP		Stadium: Nelson Mandela Stadium

Round 25	CR Belouizdad	–	MB Rouissat	Baraki
:		Flashscore; LFP		Stadium: Nelson Mandela Stadium

Round 26	CS Constantine	–	CR Belouizdad	Constantine
:		Flashscore; LFP		Stadium: Chahid Hamlaoui Stadium

Round 27	CR Belouizdad	–	MC Oran	Baraki
:		Flashscore; LFP		Stadium: Nelson Mandela Stadium

Round 28	JS Kabylie	–	CR Belouizdad	Tizi Ouzou
:		Flashscore; LFP		Stadium: Hocine Aït Ahmed Stadium

Round 29	CR Belouizdad	–	MC Alger	Baraki
:		Flashscore; LFP		Stadium: Nelson Mandela Stadium

Round 30	CR Témouchent	–	CR Belouizdad	Aïn Témouchent
:		Flashscore; LFP		Stadium: Omar Oucief Stadium

=== Algerian Cup ===
December 2026 Round of 64	–
:

=== Champions League ===
==== Qualifying rounds ====
In the qualifying rounds, each tie will be played on a home-and-away two-legged basis. If the aggregate score will be tied after the second leg, the away goals rule will be applied, and if still tied, extra time will not be played, and a penalty shoot-out will be used to determine the winner (Regulations III. 13 & 14).

===== Second round =====
23 November 2026 First leg	AS Douanes (Mauritania)	–	(Algeria) CR Belouizdad	Cheikha Ould Boïdiya Stadium, Nouakchott
17:00 UTC+0		Report

27 November 2026 Second leg	CR Belouizdad (Algeria)	– (– agg.)	(Mauritania) AS Douanes	Algiers
20:00 UTC+1		Report		Stadium: Stade du 5 Juillet

== Squad information ==
=== Appearances and goals ===
As of 19 November 2026

No.	Pos	Player	Nat	Ligue 1			Algerian Cup			Confederation Cup			Total		
No.	Pos	Player	Nat	App	St	G	App	St	G	App	St	G	App	St	G
Goalkeepers
1	GK	Tarek Bousseder	(Algeria)	0	0	0	0	0	0	0	0	0	0	0	0
16	GK	Anes Mokhtar	(Algeria)	0	0	0	0	0	0	0	0	0	0	0	0
30	GK	Farid Chaâl	(Algeria)	9	9	0	0	0	0	0	0	0	0	0	0
Defenders
2	CB	Chouaib Keddad	(Algeria)	1	0	0	0	0	0	0	0	0	0	0	0
3	RB	Houcine Benayada	(Algeria)	9	9	2	0	0	0	0	0	0	0	0	0
4	CB	Riyane Akacem	(Algeria)	9	9	0	0	0	0	0	0	0	0	0	0
13	CB	Haithem Elkouacheur	(Algeria)	3	1	0	0	0	0	0	0	0	0	0	0
15	CB	Benahmed Bendahmane	(Algeria)	3	0	0	0	0	0	0	0	0	0	0	0
17	LB	Yasser Chelfaoui	(Algeria)	9	0	0	0	0	0	0	0	0	0	0	0
21	CB	Youcef Laouafi	(Algeria)	9	9	0	0	0	0	0	0	0	0	0	0
22	RB	Fouad Kermiche	(Algeria)	0	0	0	0	0	0	0	0	0	0	0	0
23	CB	Sofiane Bouchar	(Algeria)	8	8	0	0	0	0	0	0	0	0	0	0
Midfielders
5	AM	Abdelmalek Kelaleche	(Algeria)	5	1	0	0	0	0	0	0	0	0	0	0
6	CM	Mehdi Boudjemaa	(Algeria)	9	9	0	0	0	0	0	0	0	0	0	0
8	CM	Houssem Tka	(Tunisia)	4	2	0	0	0	0	0	0	0	0	0	0
14	AM	Julio Bandessi	(Republic of the Congo)	2	0	0	0	0	0	0	0	0	0	0	0
18	DM	Salim Boukhanchouche	(Algeria)	5	0	1	0	0	0	0	0	0	0	0	0
19	AM	Abdelaziz Kahia	(Algeria)	5	1	0	0	0	0	0	0	0	0	0	0
27	CM	Djaber Kaâssis	(Algeria)	9	9	1	0	0	0	0	0	0	0	0	0
29	CM	Bilal Boukerchaoui	(Algeria)	6	6	0	0	0	0	0	0	0	0	0	0
Forwards
7	ST	Franck Etouga	(Cameroon)	4	2	1	0	0	0	0	0	0	0	0	0
9	ST	Lofti Boussouar	(Algeria)	6	2	0	0	0	0	0	0	0	0	0	0
10	LW	Farid El Melali	(Algeria)	8	6	0	0	0	0	0	0	0	0	0	0
11	LW	Abderrahmane Meziane	(Algeria)	4	2	0	0	0	0	0	0	0	0	0	0
12	RW	Kouceila Boualia	(Algeria)	8	8	1	0	0	0	0	0	0	0	0	0
20	ST	Mohamed Ali Ben Hammouda	(Tunisia)	5	4	4	0	0	0	0	0	0	0	0	0
26	RW	Yousri Bouzok	(Algeria)	2	1	1	0	0	0	0	0	0	0	0	0
Total				9		13	0		0	0		0	0		0

Last updated: 19 November 2026
Source: soccerway.com

=== Goalscorers ===
As of 19 November 2026

Includes all competitive matches.

No.	Nat.	Player	Pos.	L1	AC	CC	TOTAL
20	(Tunisia)	Mohamed Ali Ben Hammouda	ST	4	0	0	4
3	(Algeria)	Houcine Benayada	RB	2	0	0	2
27	(Algeria)	Djaber Kaâssis	CM	1	0	0	1
7	(Cameroon)	Franck Etouga	ST	1	0	0	1
26	(Algeria)	Yousri Bouzok	RW	1	0	0	1
18	(Algeria)	Salim Boukhanchouche	DM	1	0	0	1
12	(Algeria)	Kouceila Boualia	RW	1	0	0	1
10	(Algeria)	Farid El Melali	LW	1	0	0	1
Own Goals				1	0	0	1
Totals				13	0	0	13

=== Clean sheets ===
As of 19 November 2026

Includes all competitive matches.

					Clean sheets			
No.	Nat	Name	GP	GA	L1	AC	CC	Total
1	(Algeria)	Tarek Bousseder	0	0	0	0	0	0
16	(Algeria)	Anes Mokhtar	0	0	0	0	0	0
30	(Algeria)	Farid Chaâl	9	8	5	0	0	5
		TOTALS		8	5	0	0	5
