= Kaïs Nasri =

French footballer (born 2002)

Personal information
- Full name: Kaïs Nasri
- Date of birth: August 21, 2002 (age 24)
- Place of birth: Marseille, France
- Position: Midfielder

Youth career
- Olympique de Marseille
- SC Toulon
- 2020–2022: Lazio

Senior career*
| Years | Team | Apps | (Gls) |
| 2022–2023 | JS Kabylie | 2 | (0) |
- * Club domestic league appearances and goals as of 15 December 2022

Kaïs Nasri (born August 21, 2002) is a French-Algerian footballer who plays as a midfielder.

== Career ==
In August 2020, Nasri joined Italian club S.S. Lazio. On 28 June 2022, he transferred to the Algerian club JS Kabylie.

== Personal life ==
Born in France, Nasri is of Algerian descent. He is a cousin of French former professional footballer Samir Nasri.
