= Mujib Kassim =

Ethiopian footballer

Personal information
- Date of birth: 19 October 1995 (age 31)
- Place of birth: Adama, Ethiopia
- Height: 1.76 m (5 ft 9 in)
- Position: Forward

Team information
- Current team: Hawassa City
- Number: 17

Senior career*
Years	Team	Apps	(Gls)
2014–2016	Hawassa Kenema		
2016–2018	Adama City		
2018–2021	Fasil Kenema	40	(34)
2021–2022	JS Kabylie	3	(0)
2022	Fasil Kenema	10	(5)
2022–	Hawassa City	24	(10)

International career
2015–	Ethiopia	16	(0)
- * Club domestic league appearances and goals as of 2 July 2023

Mujib Kassim (Amharic: ሙጂብ ቃሲም, born 19 October 1995) is an Ethiopian professional footballer who plays as a forward for Ethiopian Premier League club Hawassa City and the Ethiopia national team.

== Club career ==
Mujib left his first club Hawassa City in 2016 opting to sign with Adama City. Mujib signed with Fasil Kenema in 2018 after leaving his On 8 August 2021, It was reported that Mujib was on the verge of a move to Algerian club JS Kabylie after leading Fasil Kenema to the Ethiopia Premier League title the prior season.

Mujib still had one year left on his contract and was expected to lead Fasil in the Caf Champions League after his goal scoring heroics for the champions, but the lure of good earnings was too much to ignore. Fasil Kenema have given their blessings for the star player's move, but details surrounding the deal were not made public.
