= Salim Boukhanchouche =

Algerian footballer (born 1991)

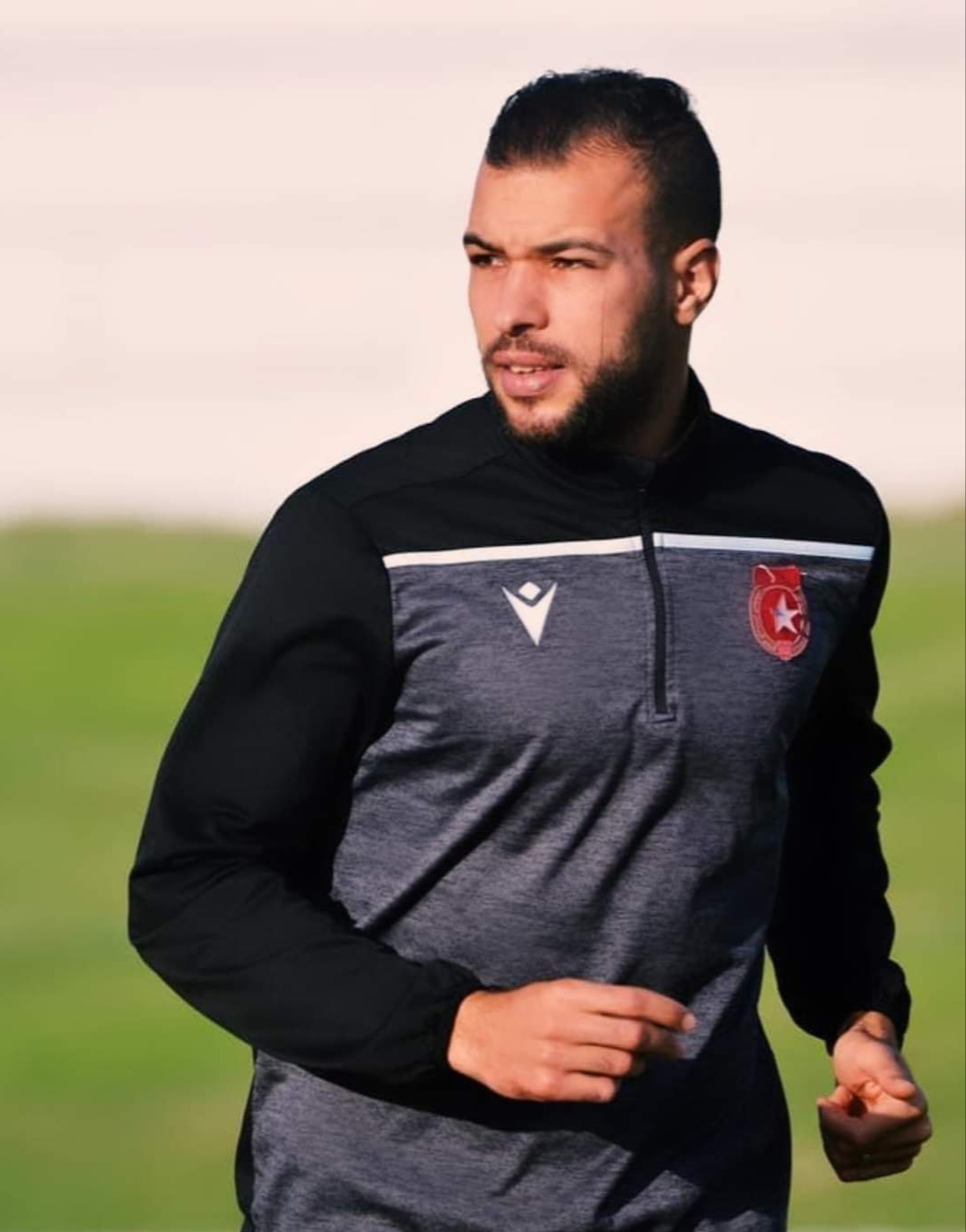
- Boukhanchouche with ES Sahel in 2020

Personal information
- Date of birth: 6 October 1991 (age 35)
- Place of birth: Merouana, Algeria
- Height: 1.88 m (6 ft 2 in)
- Position: Defensive midfielder

Team information
- Current team: CR Belouizdad
- Number: 18

Youth career
- –2011: AB Mérouana

Senior career*
Years	Team	Apps	(Gls)
2011–2014	AB Mérouana		
2014–2016	NA Hussein Dey	22	(1)
2015–2016	→ CA Batna (loan)	8	(1)
2016–2017	O Médéa	26	(4)
2017–2019	JS Kabylie	27	(2)
2018–2019	→ MO Béjaïa (loan)	8	(0)
2019–2021	ES Sahel	16	(1)
2020	→ Abha Club (loan)	6	(0)
2022–2024	JS Kabylie	48	(10)
2024–2025	USM Alger	39	(2)
2025–	CR Belouizdad	11	(2)

International career^{‡}
2017	Algeria A'	1	(0)
2018	Algeria	4	(0)
- * Club domestic league appearances and goals as of 5 June 2026 ‡ National team caps and goals as of 7 June 2018

Salim Boukhanchouche (Arabic: سليم بوخنشوش; born 6 October 1991) is an Algerian professional footballer who plays for CR Belouizdad.

== Career ==
In November 2018, Boukhanchouche joined MO Béjaïa. At the end of April 2019, he got his contract terminated. In July 2019, he signed a contract with ES Sahel.

On 31 January 2024, after terminating his contract with JS Kabylie, Boukhanchouche has signed up for a period of two years with USM Alger. On 30 November 2025, he left USM Alger. On 10 December 2025, he joined CR Belouizdad.

== International career ==
Boukhanchouche made his international debut for the Algeria A' team in a 2–1 2018 African Nations Championship qualification loss to Libya on 12 August 2017.

== Career statistics ==
=== Club ===
As of 14 June 2024

Appearances and goals by club, season and competition
Club	Season	League			Cup		Continental		Other		Total	
Club	Season	Division	Apps	Goals	Apps	Goals	Apps	Goals	Apps	Goals	Apps	Goals
NA Hussein Dey	2014–15	Algerian Ligue 1	14	1	0	0	—		—		14	1
NA Hussein Dey	2015–16	Algerian Ligue 1	8	0	—		—		—		8	0
NA Hussein Dey	Total		22	1	0	0	0	0	0	0	22	1
Olympique de Médéa	2016–17	Algerian Ligue 1	26	4	2	0	—		—		28	4
JS Kabylie	2017–18	Algerian Ligue 1	21	2	4	0	—		—		25	2
JS Kabylie	2018–19	Algerian Ligue 1	6	0	—		—		—		6	0
JS Kabylie	Total		27	2	4	0	0	0	0	0	31	2
MO Béjaïa (loan)	2018–19	Algerian Ligue 1	8	0	2	1	—		—		10	1
Étoile Sportive du Sahel	2019–20	Tunisian Ligue 1	7	0	0	0	6 (Note: Appearance(s) in Confederation Cup)	0	—		13	0
Abha Club (loan)	2019–20	Saudi Pro League	6	0	—		—		—		6	0
Étoile Sportive du Sahel	2020–21	Tunisian Ligue 1	6	1	—		3	0	—		9	1
Étoile Sportive du Sahel	2021–22	Tunisian Ligue 1	3	0	—		1	0	—		0	0
Étoile Sportive du Sahel	Total		9	1	0	0	4	0	0	0	0	0
JS Kabylie	2021–22	Algerian Ligue 1	14	4	—		—		—		14	4
JS Kabylie	2022–23	Algerian Ligue 1	21	4	1	0	8 (Note: Appearance(s) in Champions League)	1	—		30	5
JS Kabylie	2023–24	Algerian Ligue 1	13	2	—		—		—		13	2
JS Kabylie	Total		48	10	1	0	8	1	0	0	57	12
USM Alger	2023–24	Algerian Ligue 1	12	1	4	0	2	0	—		18	1
Career total			165	19	13	1	20	1	0	0	198	21

== Honours ==
USM Alger

- Algerian Cup: 2024–25
