= Massinissa Nait Salem =

Algerian footballer (born 2001)

Massinissa Nait Salem ⵎⴰⵙⵙⵉⵏⵉⵙⵙⴰ ⵏⴰⵉⵜ ⵙⴰⵍⴻⵎ
Personal information
- Full name: Massinissa Nait Salem
- Date of birth: 30 April 2001 (age 25)
- Place of birth: Timezrit, Béjaïa, Algeria
- Height: 1.70 m (5 ft 7 in)
- Position: Attacking midfielder

Team information
- Current team: IRB Nezla
- Number: 11

Youth career
- –2016: ES Timezrit
- 2016–2018: JSM Béjaïa
- 2018–2021: JS Kabylie

Senior career*
Years	Team	Apps	(Gls)
2021–2024	JS Kabylie	21	(1)
2024–2025	USM El Harrach	?	(?)
2025–2026	MO Constantine	26	(2)
2026–	IRB Nezla	10	(0)

International career^{‡}
2022	Algeria U20	1	(0)
2022–2023	Algeria U23	?	(?)
- * Club domestic league appearances and goals as of 21 November 2026 ‡ National team caps and goals as of 19 December 2023

Massinissa Nait Salem (Arabic: ماسينيسا نايت سالم; Tamazight: ⵎⴰⵙⵙⵉⵏⵉⵙⵙⴰ ⵏⴰⵉⵜ ⵙⴰⵍⴻⵎ; born 30 April 2001) is an Algerian footballer who plays as an attacking midfielder for Algerian League 2 club IRB Nezla.

== Club career ==
Massinissa Nait Salem was born in Timezrit, Béjaïa, Kabylia.

He was promoted to the senior team of JS Kabylie, signing a four-year professional contract, in August 2021, under the presidency of Cherif Mellal.

He scored his first goal in the Algerian Ligue 1 against RC Arbaâ, in December 2022.

In March 2023, he scored a winning goal for JS Kabylie against AS Vita Club in the group stage of the 2022–23 CAF Champions League.

In August 2024, he was released by JS Kabylie, under the presidency of El Hadi Ould Ali.

== International career ==
Massinissa Nait Salem played for the Algeria U23 football team at the 2022 Maurice Revello Tournament.

== Honours ==
JS Kabylie

- Algerian League Cup: 2020–21
