= Yacouba Doumbia =

Malian footballer

Personal information
- Date of birth: 11 April 1997 (age 29)
- Place of birth: Bamako, Mali
- Height: 1.92 m (6 ft 4 in)
- Position: Defender

Senior career*
Years	Team	Apps	(Gls)
2013–2018	Bamako		
2018–2021	Stade Malien		
2021–2022	JS Kabylie	21	(1)
2023–2024	Ansar		

International career^{‡}
2021–	Mali	6	(0)
- * Club domestic league appearances and goals as of 11 June 2022 ‡ National team caps and goals as of 00:11, 26 March 2021 (UTC)

Yacouba Doumbia (born 11 April 1997) is a Malian footballer who plays as a defender for the Mali national team.

== Club career ==
In August 2021, under the presidency of Cherif Mellal, Yacouba Doumbia signed a four-year contract with JS Kabylie. In July 2022, he was released by JSK, under the presidency of Yazid Yarichene.

In July 2023, Doumbia joined Lebanese Premier League club Ansar.

== International career ==
Doumbia made his professional debut with the Mali national team in a 1–0 2020 African Nations Championship win over Burkina Faso on 16 January 2021.
