= Dadi El Hocine Mouaki =

Algerian footballer (born 1996)

Personal information
- Full name: Dadi El Hocine Mouaki
- Date of birth: 11 September 1996 (age 30)
- Place of birth: Tolga, Algeria
- Height: 1.76 m (5 ft 9 in)
- Position: Winger

Team information
- Current team: JS El Biar
- Number: 9

Youth career
- –2017: USM Alger

Senior career*
Years	Team	Apps	(Gls)
2017–2018	US Biskra	11	(1)
2018–2020	NA Hussein Dey	33	(3)
2020	ES Sahel	10	(0)
2020–2021	USM Bel Abbès	23	(6)
2021–2024	JS Kabylie	90	(25)
2024-2026	CS Constantine	44	(3)
2026–	JS El Biar	1	(0)
- * Club domestic league appearances and goals as of 3 September 2026

Dadi El Hocine Mouaki (Arabic: دادي الحسين مواقي; Tamazight: ⴷⴰⴷⵉ ⴻⵍ ⵀⵓⵙⵙⵉⵏⴻ ⵎⵓⴰⴽⵉ; born 11 September 1996) is an Algerian professional footballer who plays as a winger for JS El Biar.

== Career ==
In 2017, he signed for US Biskra. In 2018, he joined for NA Hussein Dey. In 2020, he joined Tunisian club ES Sahel. In 2021, he signed for JS Kabylie. In 2024, he joined CS Constantine.

In July 2026, he joined JS El Biar.
