= Lamine Ouattara =

Burkinabé footballer

Personal information
- Full name: Mohamed Lamine Ouattara
- Date of birth: 14 June 1998 (age 28)
- Place of birth: Lopou, Ivory Coast
- Height: 1.85 m (6 ft 1 in)
- Position: Striker

Senior career*
| Years | Team | Apps | (Gls) |
| 2016–2018 | JC Bobo Dioulasso | | |
| 2018–2021 | AS SONABEL | 35 | (26) |
| 2022–2023 | JS Kabylie | 27 | (4) |
| 2023–2024 | Salitas FC | | |
| 2024–2025 | AS Vita Club | | |
| 2025–2026 | Al-Taraji | | |

International career
| 2021– | Burkina Faso | 6 | (0) |
- * Club domestic league appearances and goals as of 21 June 2024

Lamine Ouattara (born 14 June 1998) is a professional footballer who plays as a striker. Born in the Ivory Coast, he plays for the Burkina Faso national team.

== Career ==
On 30 September 2025, Ouattara joined Saudi Second Division side Al-Taraji.

== International career ==
Born in the Ivory Coast, Ouattara is of Burkinabé descent. He debuted for the Burkina Faso national team in a 1–0 2020 African Nations Championship loss to Mali on 16 January 2021.
