= Redouane Zerdoum =

Algerian footballer (born 1999)

Personal information
- Full name: Redouane Zerdoum
- Date of birth: 1 January 1999 (age 27)
- Place of birth: Hussein Dey, Algeria
- Position: Forward

Team information
- Current team: Stade Beaucairois
- Number: 14

Youth career
- –2019: NA Hussein Dey

Senior career*
Years	Team	Apps	(Gls)
2019	NA Hussein Dey	18	(5)
2020–2021	ES Sahel	19	(2)
2021–2022	Club Africain	9	(0)
2022–2023	JS Kabylie	9	(0)
2023–2024	ASO Chlef	12	(1)
2024–2025	NA Hussein Dey		
2025–	Stade Beaucairois		
- * Club domestic league appearances and goals as of 14 June 2024

Redouane Zerdoum (Arabic: رضوان زردوم; born 1 January 1999) is an Algerian footballer who plays for Stade Beaucairois.

== Career ==
In 2020, he signed a contract with ES Sahel. In 2021, he joined Club Africain. In 2022, he joined JS Kabylie. In 2023, he joined ASO Chlef. in 2024, he joined NA Hussein Dey.
