= Moussa Benzaid =

Algerian footballer (born 1999)

Personal information
- Full name: Moussa Saad Eddine Benzaid
- Date of birth: 9 March 1999 (age 27)
- Place of birth: Ouargla, Algeria
- Height: 1.88 m (6 ft 2 in)
- Position: Centre-back

Team information
- Current team: MB Rouissat
- Number: 6

Youth career
- –2018: CR Béni Thour
- 2019–2020: CA Bordj Bou Arreridj

Senior career*
Years	Team	Apps	(Gls)
2020–2021	HB Chelghoum Laïd		
2021–2025	JS Kabylie	71	(0)
2025–2026	Asswehly SC	11	(0)
2026–	MB Rouissat		(0)

International career
2018	Algeria U20		
- * Club domestic league appearances and goals as of 9 August 2026

Moussa Saad Eddine Benzaid (Arabic: موسى سعد الدين بن زايد; Tamazight: ⵎⵓⵙⵙⴰ ⵙⴰⴰⴷ ⴻⴷⴷⵉⵏⴻ ⴱⴻⵏⵣⴰⵉⴷ; born 9 March 1999) is an Algerian professional footballer who plays as a centre-back for MB Rouissat.

== Personal life ==
Born in Ouargla, Algeria, Moussa Benzaid is originally from In Salah, Algeria.

== Club career ==
Benzaid is a youth product of CR Béni Thour, until 2018. He joined the U21 team of CA Bordj Bou Arreridj in 2019.

Later he went on to join Algerian second division side HB Chelghoum Laïd in 2020 for his amateur debut, then in 2021 under the presidency of Cherif Mellal, he signed a five-year contract with JS Kabylie for his professional debut. In 2023, he scored his first goal with JS Kabylie against AS Vita Club in the group stage of the 2022–23 CAF Champions League. In 2025, he was transferred by JS Kabylie to Libyan Premier League club Asswehly SC. With Asswehly SC, he signed a contract, until the end of the 2027–28 season. In 2026, he was released by Asswehly. On 9 August 2026, he joined MB Rouissat.

== Style of play ==
In Algeria, Benzaid is compared by many football fans to Antonio Rüdiger, in his ability to win duels on the field. He has also an athletic profile similar to former Algerian left-back Abderraouf Zarabi.

== Honours ==
HB Chelghoum Laïd

- Algerian League 2: 2020–21

Asswehly SC

- Libyan Premier League: 2025–26
