= Fares Nechat Djabri =

Algerian footballer (born 2001)

Personal information
- Full name: Fares Nechat Djabri
- Date of birth: 25 May 2001 (age 25)
- Place of birth: Bouira, Algeria
- Height: 1.73 m (5 ft 8 in)
- Position: Right-back

Team information
- Current team: Ghazl El Mahalla
- Number: 23

Youth career
- –2021: JS Kabylie

Senior career*
Years	Team	Apps	(Gls)
2021–2026	JS Kabylie	100	(1)
2026-	Ghazl El Mahalla	1	(0)

International career^{‡}
2020–2022	Algeria U20	5	(0)
2021–2024	Algeria U23	13	(0)
2025–	Algeria A'	2	(0)
- * Club domestic league appearances and goals as of 22 August 2026 ‡ National team caps and goals as of 20:00, 23 August 2025 (UTC)

Fares Nechat Djabri (Arabic: فارس نشاط جابري; Tamazight: ⴼⴰⵔⴻⵙ ⵏⴻⵙⵀⴰⵜ ⴷⵊⴰⴱⵔⵉ; born 25 May 2001) is an Algerian professional footballer who plays as a right-back.

== Club career ==
Fares Nechat Djabri was born in Bouira, Kabylia, Algeria. In March 2021, he was promoted to the senior team of JS Kabylie. In July 2026, he left JS Kabylie.

== International career ==
Fares Nechat Djabri played for the Algeria U23 football team at the 2022 Maurice Revello Tournament.

In July 2025, he was selected by Madjid Bougherra to participate in the 2024 CHAN, with the Algeria A' football team.

== Honours ==
JS Kabylie

- Algerian League Cup: 2020–21
- CAF Confederation Cup runner-up: 2020–21
