= Mohamed Reda Boumechra =

Algerian footballer (born 1997)

Personal information
- Full name: Mohamed Reda Boumechra
- Date of birth: 3 June 1997 (age 29)
- Place of birth: Oran, Algeria
- Height: 1.78 m (5 ft 10 in)
- Position: Attacking midfielder

Team information
- Current team: ES Sétif
- Number: 26

Youth career
- –2015: ASM Oran

Senior career*
Years	Team	Apps	(Gls)
2015–2016	ASM Oran	3	(0)
2016–2021	USM Alger	36	(2)
2018–2019	→ USM El Harrach (loan)	25	(3)
2021–2024	JS Kabylie	52	(0)
2024–2026	USM Khenchela	47	(10)
2026–	ES Sétif	1	(0)

International career^{‡}
2016	Algeria U20	2	(0)
- * Club domestic league appearances and goals as of 3 September 2026 ‡ National team caps and goals as of 5 November 2016

Mohamed Reda Boumechra (Arabic: محمد رضا بومشرة; born 3 June 1997) is an Algerian professional footballer who plays as an attacking midfielder for ES Sétif.

== Club career ==
In the summer of 2016, Boumechra signed a four-year contract with USM Alger.

In the summer of 2021, he signed a three-year contract with JS Kabylie.

On 15 June 2026, he joined ES Sétif.
