= 2020–21 JS Kabylie season =

JS Kabylie
2020–21 season
- President: Chérif Mellal
- Head coach: Yamen Zalfani (until 28 November 2020); Youcef Bouzidi (from 28 November 2020) (until 5 January 2021); Denis Lavagne (from 7 January 2021) (until 12 August 2021)
- Stadium: Stade 1er Novembre 1954
- Ligue 1: 5th
- League Cup: Winners
- Confederation Cup: Runners–up
- Top goalscorer: League: Mohamed Abdussalam Tubal; Rezki Hamroun (7 goals); All: Rédha Bensayah (10 goals)
- Highest home attendance: 0 (Note: no one can attend games due to the COVID-19 pandemic)
- Lowest home attendance: 0 (Note: no one can attend games due to the COVID-19 pandemic)
- Average home league attendance: 0 (Note: no one can attend games due to the COVID-19 pandemic)
Home colours	Away colours

In the 2020–21 season, JS Kabylie is competing in the Ligue 1 for the 52nd season, as well as the Algerian League Cup. It is their 52nd consecutive season in the top flight of Algerian football. They will be competing in Ligue 1 and the Confederation Cup.

A record season which ends with 57 matches played (record for a football club in Algeria), a Confederation Cup final (19 years after that of 2002), a League Cup won which allows the club to end a 10-year drought and add another title to its record as well as a 5th place in the championship.

== Squad list ==
Players and squad numbers last updated on 15 November 2020.
Note: Flags indicate national team as has been defined under FIFA eligibility rules. Players may hold more than one non-FIFA nationality.

No.	Nat.	Position	Name	Date of birth (age)	Signed from
Goalkeepers
25	(Algeria)	GK	Oussama Benbot	11 October 1994 (aged 26)	(Algeria) Youth system
80	(Algeria)	GK	Mohamed Idir Hadid	26 April 2002 (aged 18)	(Algeria) Youth system
1	(Algeria)	GK	Masten Becheker	20 August 1999 (aged 21)	(Algeria) Youth system
50	(Algeria)	GK	Karam Hamdad	27 July 2000 (aged 20)	(Algeria) Youth system
Defenders
2	(Algeria)	CB	Ahmed Ait Abdessalem	30 August 1997 (aged 23)	(Algeria) Youth system
3	(Algeria)	LB	Abdelmoumen Chikhi	29 February 1996 (aged 24)	(Algeria) NC Magra
4	(Algeria)	CB	Bilal Tizi Bouali	14 December 1997 (aged 23)	(Algeria) Youth system
5	(Algeria)	CB	Badreddine Souyad	3 May 1995 (aged 25)	(Algeria) RC Arbaâ
22	(Algeria)	LB	Walid Bencherifa	6 November 1988 (aged 32)	(Algeria) CS Constantine
23	(Algeria)	RB	Racim Mebarki	10 April 1998 (aged 22)	(Algeria) Youth system
26	(Algeria)	CB	Ilyes Faiçal Haddouche	1 July 1998 (aged 22)	(Algeria) CRB Dar El Beida
31	(Algeria)	RB	Ahmed Mohamed Kerroum	27 June 2000 (aged 20)	(Algeria) ASM Oran
61	(Algeria)	CB	Nassim Mekideche	3 April 2000 (aged 20)	(Algeria) Youth system
Midfielders
6	(Algeria)	DM	Ammar El Orfi	3 November 1998 (aged 22)	(Algeria) USM Alger U21
7	(Algeria)	DM	Mohamed Benchaira	10 January 1992 (aged 28)	(Algeria) AS Ain M'lila
10	(Algeria)	DM	Abdessamed Bounoua	24 April 1991 (aged 29)	(Algeria) USM Bel Abbès
19	(Algeria)	DM	Malik Raiah	20 September 1992 (aged 28)	(Algeria) NA Hussein Dey
12	(Tunisia)	AM	Oussama Darragi	3 April 1987 (aged 33)	(Tunisia) Club Africain
13	(Algeria)	DM	Aziz Benabdi	9 August 1993 (aged 27)	(Algeria) MO Béjaïa
14	(Libya)	RM	Mohamed Tubal Abdussalam	23 June 1993 (aged 27)	(Libya) Al-Ittihad Club
20	(Algeria)	AM	Juba Aguieb	28 November 1996 (aged 24)	(Algeria) ES Ben Aknoun
48	(Algeria)	AM	Kouceila Boualia	14 March 2001 (aged 19)	(Algeria) Youth system
Forwards
8	(Algeria)	LW	Juba Oukaci	8 July 1996 (aged 24)	(Algeria) Youth system
9	(Algeria)	ST	Mohammed Zakaria Boulahia	1 June 1997 (aged 23)	(Spain) Albacete Balompié II
11	(Algeria)	RW	Rezki Hamroune	10 March 1996 (aged 24)	Unattached
15	(Algeria)		Massinissa Nezla	12 September 1998 (aged 22)	(Algeria) Youth system
16	(Algeria)		Oussama Daibeche	28 January 1999 (aged 21)	(Algeria) Youth system
17	(Algeria)	LW	Rédha Bensayah	22 August 1994 (aged 26)	(Algeria) JSM Béjaïa
18	(Algeria)	RW	Hadj Habib Saïd Fellahi	20 March 1997 (aged 23)	(Algeria) ASO Chlef
24	(Algeria)	ST	Chaker Kaddour Chérif	8 February 1997 (aged 23)	(Algeria) ASO Chlef
	(Democratic Republic of the Congo)	ST	Glody Kilangalanga	8 August 1999 (aged 21)	(Tunisia) CS Chebba

== Pre-season ==
16 October 2020 Friendly	JS Kabylie	3–3	Olympique de Médéa	Tazmalt
	Benchaira; Hamroune (pen.); Fellahi	Report
Note: Lineup for JS Kabylie - Benbot, Mebarki (Kerroum), Bencherifa, Souyad (Chikhi), Haddouche, Bounoua (Oukaci), Raiah (El-Orfi), Benchaira (Aguieb), Loucif (Fellahi), Hamroune (Nezla), Bensayah.

21 October 2020 Friendly	JS Kabylie	1–0	US Biskra	Dar El Beïda
	Benchaira			Stadium: Stade Omar Benrabah

24 October 2020 Friendly	JS Kabylie	1–2	Paradou AC	Hydra
				Stadium: Stade Ahmed Falek

5 November 2020 Tournoi Smaïl Khabatou	JS Kabylie	1–2	NA Hussein Dey	Hydra
15:45		Report		Stadium: Stade Ahmed Falek

7 November 2020 Tournoi Smaïl Khabatou	JS Kabylie	0–1	Paradou AC	Hydra
12:30				Stadium: Stade Ahmed Falek

== Competitions ==
=== Overview ===
Competition	Record								Started round	Final position / round	First match	Last match
Competition	G	W	D	L	GF	GA	GD	Win %	Started round	Final position / round	First match	Last match
Ligue 1	38	17	10	11	44	33	+11	44.74	—N/a	5th	27 November 2020	28 August 2021
League Cup	4	3	1	0	7	2	+5	75.00	Round of 16	Winners	8 May 2021	10 August 2021
Confederation Cup	15	9	4	2	21	11	+10	60.00	Preliminary round	Runners–up	22 December 2020	10 July 2021
Total	57	29	15	13	72	46	+26	50.88				

Updated to match played 28 August 2021
Source: Competitions

== League table ==
Pos	Team	Pld	W	D	L	GF	GA	GD	Pts	Qualification or relegation
3	JS Saoura	38	20	9	9	60	30	+30	69 (Note: On March 13, 2021 after the participation of a penalized player Oussama Meddahi against Paradou AC, JS Saoura Lost the match 3–0.)	Qualification for Confederation Cup
4	USM Alger	38	19	8	11	62	39	+23	65	
5	JS Kabylie	38	17	10	11	44	33	+11	61	Qualification for Confederation Cup
6	MC Oran	38	15	15	8	51	37	+14	60	
7	MC Alger	38	15	12	11	59	43	+16	57	

Updated to match(es) played on 28 August 2021. Source: dzfoot.com
Rules for classification: 1) points; 2) head-to-head points; 3) head-to-head goal difference; 4) goal difference; 5) total goals; 6) fairplay ranking; 7) playoff.

=== Results summary ===
Overall								Home						Away					
Pld	W	D	L	GF	GA	GD	Pts	W	D	L	GF	GA	GD	W	D	L	GF	GA	GD
38	17	10	11	44	33	+11	61	9	5	5	20	19	+1	8	5	6	24	14	+10

Last updated: 28 August 2021.
Source: Competitive matches

=== Results by round ===
Round	1	2	3	4	5	6	7	8	9	10	11	12	13	14	15	16	17	18	19	20	21	22	23	24	25	26	27	28	29	30	31	32	33	34	35	36	37	38
Ground																																						
Result	D	D	L	W	W	D	L	W	W	L	W	W	L	W	W	W	L	W	D	D	L	L	W	D	D	L	W	L	W	D	D	W	L	W	D	L	D	W
Position	12	14	19	9	6	8	10	9	8	10	8	5	8	6	6	5	5	4	3	5	5	7	7	5	6	7	7	7	7	6	6	6	7	5	6	6	6	5

Updated to match(es) played on 24 August 2021. Source: Competitive matches
A = Away; H = Home; W = Win; D = Draw; L = Loss

=== Matches ===
On 22 October 2020, the Algerian Ligue Professionnelle 1 fixtures were announced.

27 November 2020 Round 1	JS Kabylie	0–0	CA Bordj Bou Arreridj	Tizi Ouzou
16:00		Soccerway report		Stadium: Stade 1er Novembre 1954; Attendance: 0 (close doors); Referee: Nabil Boukhalfa

4 December 2020 Round 2	MC Oran	0–0	JS Kabylie	Oran
16:00		Soccerway report		Stadium: Ahmed Zabana Stadium; Attendance: 0 (close doors); Referee: Abderrezzak Arab

11 December 2020 Round 3	JS Kabylie	0–3	CR Belouizdad	Tizi Ouzou
15:00		Soccerway report	Belahouel 25'; Sayoud 30'; Tabti 69'	Stadium: Stade 1er Novembre 1954; Attendance: 0 (close doors); Referee: Yazid Ibrir

18 December 2020 Round 4	ASO Chlef	0–2	JS Kabylie	Chlef
15:00		Soccerway report	Bensayah 53'; Hamroune 68' (pen.)	Stadium: Stade Mohamed Boumezrag; Attendance: 0 (close doors); Referee: Said Aouina

27 December 2020 Round 6	US Biskra	1–1	JS Kabylie	Biskra
14:30	Chibane 9'	Soccerway report	Boufeligha 22' (o.g.)	Stadium: Stade du 18 Février; Attendance: 0 (close doors); Referee: Bilal Bendjahene

31 December 2020 Round 5	JS Kabylie	1–0	AS Ain M'lila	Tizi Ouzou
15:00	Kerroum 26'	Soccerway report		Stadium: Stade 1er Novembre 1954; Attendance: 0 (close doors); Referee: Mohamed Saïdi

11 January 2021 Round 7	JS Kabylie	1–2	USM Alger	Tizi Ouzou
14:30	Tubal 90+2'	Soccerway report	Alilet 7'; Mahious 68'	Stadium: Stade 1er Novembre 1954; Attendance: 0 (close doors); Referee: Mehdi Abid Charef

16 January 2021 Round 8	WA Tlemcen	0–2	JS Kabylie	Tlemcen
14:00		Soccerway report	Tubal 80'; Nezla 90+2'	Stadium: Stade Akid Lotfi; Attendance: 0 (close doors); Referee: Abdelmoumen Touabti

22 January 2021 Round 9	JS Kabylie	2–1	JS Saoura	Tizi Ouzou
14:30	Hamroune 40' (pen.); Bounoua 86'	Soccerway report	Droueche 90+1' (pen.)	Stadium: Stade 1er Novembre 1954; Attendance: 0 (close doors); Referee: Youcef Gamouh

26 January 2021 Round 10	NC Magra	1–0	JS Kabylie	Magra
14:30	Aïb 90'	Soccerway report		Stadium: Boucheligue Brothers Stadium; Attendance: 0 (close doors); Referee: Mustapha Bessiri

30 January 2021 Round 11	JS Kabylie	1–0	JSM Skikda	Tizi Ouzou
15:00	Zaka 65'	Soccerway report		Stadium: Stade 1er Novembre 1954; Attendance: 0 (close doors); Referee: Lotfi Bekouassa

6 February 2021 Round 12	NA Hussein Dey	0–2	JS Kabylie	Belouizdad
14:30		Soccerway report	Benchaira 15'; Bensayah 90'	Stadium: Stade 20 Août 1955; Attendance: 0 (close doors); Referee: Mehdi Abid Charef

27 February 2021 Round 15	MC Alger	1–2	JS Kabylie	Algiers
16:00	Frioui 64'	Soccerway report	Zaka 48'; Ait Abdessalem 80'	Stadium: Stade du 5 Juillet; Attendance: 0 (close doors); Referee: Youcef Gamouh

5 March 2021 Round 16	JS Kabylie	2–1	Olympique de Médéa	Tizi Ouzou
16:00	Hamroune 38'; Benabdi 90+1'	Soccerway report	Kenniche 78'	Stadium: Stade 1er Novembre 1954; Attendance: 0 (close doors); Referee: Abdelali Ibrir

21 March 2021 Round 19	JS Kabylie	1–1	Paradou AC	Tizi Ouzou
15:00	Benabdi 30'	Soccerway report	Messibah 36'	Stadium: Stade 1er Novembre 1954; Attendance: 0 (close doors); Referee: Abdelmoumen Touabti

26 March 2021 Round 13	JS Kabylie	0–1	CS Constantine	Tizi Ouzou
15:00		Soccerway report	Temine 65'	Stadium: Stade 1er Novembre 1954; Attendance: 0 (close doors); Referee: Mustapha Ghorbal

30 March 2021 Round 14	JS Kabylie	1–0	RC Relizane	Tizi Ouzou
15:00	Raiah 18'	Soccerway report		Stadium: Stade 1er Novembre 1954; Attendance: 0 (close doors); Referee: Youcef Gamouh

15 April 2021 Round 17	ES Sétif	1–0	JS Kabylie	Sétif
22:30	Bekakchi 60'	Soccerway report		Stadium: Stade 8 Mai 1945; Attendance: 0 (close doors); Referee: Abderrezzak Arab

25 April 2021 Round 18	USM Bel Abbès	0–5	JS Kabylie	Sidi Bel Abbès
22:30		Soccerway report	Tubal 42', 57', 81'; Boualia 68'; Bensayah 79'	Stadium: Stade 24 Fevrier 1956; Attendance: 0 (close doors); Referee: Abdelali Ibrir

4 May 2021 Round 20	CA Bordj Bou Arreridj	1–1	JS Kabylie	Bordj Bou Arréridj
22:30	Benothmane 44'	Soccerway report	Bensayah 68'	Stadium: Stade 20 Août 1955; Attendance: 0 (close doors); Referee: Hamza Bouslimani

11 May 2021 Round 21	JS Kabylie	0–1	MC Oran	Tizi Ouzou
22:30		Soccerway report	Mellel 44' (pen.)	Stadium: Stade 1er Novembre 1954; Attendance: 0 (close doors); Referee: Youcef Gamouh

26 May 2021 Round 23	JS Kabylie	2–1	ASO Chlef	Tizi Ouzou
18:00	Hamroune 26' (pen.); Tizi Bouali 54'	Soccerway report	Benzaza 6'	Stadium: Stade 1er Novembre 1954; Attendance: 0 (close doors); Referee: Mohamed Saïdi

30 May 2021 Round 24	AS Ain M'lila	1–1	JS Kabylie	Aïn M'lila
19:00	Hamia 1'	Soccerway report	Tubal 62'	Stadium: Touhami Zoubir Khelifi Stadium; Attendance: 0 (close doors); Referee: Said Aouina

13 June 2021 Round 25	JS Kabylie	1–1	US Biskra	Tizi Ouzou
19:00	Hamroune 63'	Soccerway report	Mokhtar 16'	Stadium: Stade 1er Novembre 1954; Attendance: 0 (close doors); Referee: Abdelmoumen Touabti

1 July 2021 Round 28	JS Saoura	2–0	JS Kabylie	Béchar
18:00	Hammia 47' (pen.); Lahmeri 69'	Soccerway report		Stadium: Stade 20 Août 1955; Attendance: 0 (close doors); Referee: Bilal Bendjahene

4 July 2021 Round 29	JS Kabylie	1–0	NC Magra	Tizi Ouzou
20:00	Bensayah 8' (pen.)	Soccerway report		Stadium: Stade 1er Novembre 1954; Attendance: 0 (close doors); Referee: Abderrezzak Arab

14 July 2021 Round 31	JS Kabylie	1–1	NA Hussein Dey	Tizi Ouzou
21:00	Bencherifa 74'	Soccerway report	Boussalem 49'	Stadium: Stade 1er Novembre 1954; Attendance: 0 (close doors); Referee: Mohamed Saïdi

18 July 2021 Round 32	CS Constantine	1–2	JS Kabylie	Constantine
17:45	Souyad 34' (o.g.)	Soccerway report	Bencherifa 43'; Zaka 68'	Stadium: Stade Ramdane Benabdelmalek; Attendance: 0 (close doors); Referee: Ali Nader

23 July 2021 Round 33	RC Relizane	1–0	JS Kabylie	Relizane
18:00	Barka 40'	Soccerway report		Stadium: Stade Tahar Zoughari; Attendance: 0 (close doors); Referee: Said Aouina

27 July 2021 Round 34	JS Kabylie	2–1	MC Alger	Tizi Ouzou
21:00	Hamroune 41', 48'	Soccerway report	Abdelhafid 24'	Stadium: Stade 1er Novembre 1954; Attendance: 0 (close doors); Referee: Mehdi Abid Charef

30 July 2021 Round 22	CR Belouizdad	2–1	JS Kabylie	Belouizdad
18:00	Nessakh 28'; Sayoud 44'	Soccerway report	Boualia 36'	Stadium: Stade 20 Août 1955; Attendance: 0 (close doors); Referee: Abdelali Ibrir

3 August 2021 Round 26	USM Alger	1–0	JS Kabylie	Bologhine
21:00	Belkacemi 48'	Soccerway report		Stadium: Omar Hamadi Stadium; Attendance: 0 (close doors); Referee: Youcef Gamouh

6 August 2021 Round 27	JS Kabylie	3–2	WA Tlemcen	Tizi Ouzou
21:00	Tizi Bouali 25'; Tubal 51'; Ghanem 52'	Soccerway report	Semahi 84'; Nezouani 90+2'	Stadium: Stade 1er Novembre 1954; Attendance: 0 (close doors); Referee: Abderrezzak Arab

15 August 2021 Round 35	Olympique de Médéa	1–1	JS Kabylie	Médéa
17:30	Dadache 51'	Soccerway report	Nezla 64'	Stadium: Stade Imam Lyes; Attendance: 0 (close doors); Referee: Riadh Ammar Khodja

18 August 2021 Round 36	JS Kabylie	1–3	ES Sétif	Tizi Ouzou
21:00	Nezla 66'	Soccerway report	Kendouci 49'; Djabou 57'; Bakrar 82'	Stadium: Stade 1er Novembre 1954; Attendance: 0 (close doors); Referee: Youcef Taieb Bouderbal

21 August 2021 Round 37	JS Kabylie	0–0	USM Bel Abbès	Tizi Ouzou
21:00		Soccerway report		Stadium: Stade 1er Novembre 1954; Attendance: 0 (close doors); Referee: Ahmed Benhamou

24 August 2021 Round 38	Paradou AC	0–1	JS Kabylie	Dar El Beïda
17:30		Soccerway report	Houari 36'	Stadium: Omar Benrabah Stadium; Attendance: 0 (close doors); Referee: Mohamed Belkbir

28 August 2021 Round 30	JSM Skikda	1–1	JS Kabylie	Skikda
17:30	Benhamrouche 57'	Soccerway report	Houari 13'	Stadium: Stade 20 Août 1955; Attendance: 0 (close doors); Referee: Akram Mechairia

== League Cup ==
8 May 2021 Round of 16	JS Kabylie	2–0	NA Hussein Dey	Tizi Ouzou
22:30	Kerroum 67'; Boualia 84'			Stadium: Stade 1er Novembre 1954; Attendance: 0 (close doors); Referee: Mehdi Abid Charef
Note: Lineup for JS Kabylie - Benbot, Kerroum, Ait Abdessalem, Souyad, Bencherifa, Benabdi, Benchaira (Medane, 62'), Raiah, Boualia, Boulahia (Haroun, 62'), Bensayah (Nechat, '73).

4 June 2021 Quarter-finals	US Biskra	0–2	JS Kabylie	Biskra
17:45		Report	Tubal 20'; Hamroune 69' (pen.)	Stadium: Stade du 18 Février; Attendance: 0 (close doors); Referee: Nabil Boukhalfa

9 June 2021 Semi-finals	JS Kabylie	1–0	WA Tlemcen	Tizi Ouzou
17:30	Tubal 61'	Report		Stadium: Stade 1er Novembre 1954; Attendance: 0 (close doors); Referee: Abdelali Ibrir

10 August 2021 Final	NC Magra	2–2 (a.e.t.) (1–4 p)	JS Kabylie	Algiers
19:00	Demane 11'; Korichi 93'		Boualia 37'; Haroun 120'	Stadium: Stade du 5 Juillet; Attendance: 0 (close doors); Referee: Mustapha Ghorbal
	Penalties
	Fegaâs (penalty missed); Korichi (penalty missed); Belhamri (penalty scored)		(penalty scored) Souyad; (penalty scored) Ghanem; (penalty scored) Benchaira; (penalty scored) Boualia

== Confederation Cup ==
=== First round ===
22 December 2020 First leg	USGN (Niger)	1–2	(Algeria) JS Kabylie	Niamey
15:30 UTC+1	Darankoum 34' (pen.)	Report	Bensayah 25'; Nezla 88'	Stadium: Stade Général Seyni Kountché; Attendance: 0 (close doors); Referee: Quadri Ololade Adebimpe (Nigeria)

5 January 2021 Second leg	JS Kabylie (Algeria)	2–0 (4–1 agg.)	(Niger) USGN	Tizi Ouzou
15:00 UTC+1	Bensayah 5'; Oukaci 65'	Report		Stadium: Stade 1er Novembre 1954; Attendance: 0 (close doors); Referee: Mohamed Agha (Libya)

=== Play-off round ===
14 February 2021 First leg	Stade Malien (Mali)	2–1	(Algeria) JS Kabylie	Bamako
17:00 UTC+0	Ngoda 28'; Coulibaly 90' (pen.)	Report	Souyad 53'	Stadium: Stade du 26 Mars; Referee: Fabricio Duarte (Cape Verde)

21 February 2021 Second leg	JS Kabylie (Algeria)	1–0 (2–2 agg.)	(Mali) Stade Malien	Tizi Ouzou
16:00 UTC+1	Souyad 5'	Report		Stadium: Stade 1er Novembre 1954; Attendance: 0 (close doors); Referee: Sadok Selmi (Tunisia)

=== Group stage ===
==== Group B ====
Pos	Team	Pld	W	D	L	GF	GA	GD	Pts	Qualification	JSK	COT	RSB	NAP
1	(Algeria) JS Kabylie	6	3	3	0	7	4	+3	12	Advance to knockout stage	—	1–0	0–0	2–1
2	(Cameroon) Coton Sport	6	3	0	3	10	6	+4	9	Advance to knockout stage	1–2	—	2–0	5–1
3	(Morocco) RS Berkane	6	2	2	2	4	4	0	8		0–0	2–1	—	2–0
4	(Zambia) NAPSA Stars	6	1	1	4	5	12	−7	4		2–2	0–1	1–0	—

Source: Soccerway

10 March 2021 Matchday 1	JS Kabylie (Algeria)	1–0	(Cameroon) Coton Sport	Tizi Ouzou
19:00 (20:00 UTC+1)	Souyad 88'	Report		Stadium: Stade 1er Novembre 1954; Attendance: 0 (close doors); Referee: Mutaz Ibrahim (Libya)

17 March 2021 Matchday 2	NAPSA Stars (Zambia)	2–2	(Algeria) JS Kabylie	Lusaka
13:00 (15:00 UTC+2)	Mukeya 12'; Soko 63'	Report	Simwanza 82' (o.g.); Nezla 90'	Stadium: National Heroes Stadium; Attendance: 0 (close doors); Referee: Kalilou Traoré (Ivory Coast)

4 April 2021 Matchday 3	RS Berkane (Morocco)	0–0	(Algeria) JS Kabylie	Berkane
19:00 (20:00 UTC+1)		Report		Stadium: Stade Municipal de Berkane; Attendance: 0 (close doors); Referee: Issa Sy (Senegal)

11 April 2021 Matchday 4	JS Kabylie (Algeria)	0–0	(Morocco) RS Berkane	Tizi Ouzou
19:00 (20:00 UTC+1)		Report		Stadium: Stade 1er Novembre 1954; Attendance: 0 (close doors); Referee: Norman Matemera (Zimbabwe)

21 April 2021 Matchday 5	Coton Sport (Cameroon)	1–2	(Algeria) JS Kabylie	Garoua
13:00 (14:00 UTC+1)	Alemi 89' (pen.)	Report	Bensayah 63'; Bencherifa 68'	Stadium: Roumdé Adjia Stadium; Attendance: 0 (close doors); Referee: Mohamed Maarouf (Egypt)

28 April 2021 Matchday 6	JS Kabylie (Algeria)	2–1	(Zambia) NAPSA Stars	Tizi Ouzou
22:00 (23:00 UTC+1)	Bencherifa 29'; Boualia 57'	Report	Mayuka 90'	Stadium: Stade 1er Novembre 1954; Attendance: 0 (close doors); Referee: Mohamed Ali Moussa (Niger)

=== knockout stage ===
==== Quarter-finals ====
16 May 2021 First leg	CS Sfaxien (Tunisia)	0–1	(Algeria) JS Kabylie	Sfax
16:00 (17:00 UTC+1)		Report	Bensayah 61' (pen.)	Stadium: Stade Taïeb Mhiri; Attendance: 0 (close doors); Referee: Mahmoud El Banna (Egypt)

23 May 2021 Second leg	JS Kabylie (Algeria)	1–1	(Tunisia) CS Sfaxien	Tizi Ouzou
16:00 (17:00 UTC+1)	Bensayah 39' (pen.)	Report	Harzi 82' (pen.)	Stadium: Stade du 1er Novembre 1954; Attendance: 0 (close doors); Referee: Rédouane Jiyed (Morocco)

==== Semi-finals ====
20 June 2021 First leg	Coton Sport (Cameroon)	1–2	(Algeria) JS Kabylie	Garoua
16:00 (17:00 UTC+1)	Araina 29'	Report	Kerroum 45+2'; Etame 62' (o.g.)	Stadium: Roumdé Adjia Stadium; Referee: Amin Omar (Egypt)

27 June 2021 Second leg	JS Kabylie (Algeria)	3–0	(Cameroon) Coton Sport	Algiers (Note: JS Kabylie played their home match against Coton Sport at Stade du 5 Juillet, Algiers, instead of their regular home stadium Stade du 1er Novembre 1954, Tizi Ouzou.)
19:00 (20:00 UTC+1)	Zaka 6', 45+1'; Souyad 37' (pen.)	Report		Stadium: Stade du 5 Juillet; Attendance: 0 (close doors); Referee: Sadok Selmi (Tunisia)

==== Final ====
10 July 2021	Raja Casablanca (Morocco)	2–1	(Algeria) JS Kabylie	Cotonou, Benin
19:00 GMT (20:00 UTC+1)	Rahimi 5'; Malango 14'	Report	Zaka 46'	Stadium: Stade de l'Amitié; Referee: Victor Gomes (South Africa)

== Squad information ==
=== Playing statistics ===
No.	Pos	Nat	Player	Total		Ligue 1		League Cup		Confederation Cup	
No.	Pos	Nat	Player	Apps	Goals	Apps	Goals	Apps	Goals	Apps	Goals
25	GK	(Algeria) ALG	Oussama Benbot	40	0	23	0	4	0	13	0
30	GK	(Algeria) ALG	Abdelatif Ramdane	4	0	4	0	0	0	0	0
80	GK	(Algeria) ALG	Mohamed Idir Hadid	13	0	11	0	0	0	2	0
2	DF	(Algeria) ALG	Ahmed Ait Abdessalem	46	1	27	1	4	0	15	0
3	DF	(Algeria) ALG	Abdelmoumen Chikhi	29	0	24	0	1	0	4	0
4	DF	(Algeria) ALG	Bilal Tizi Bouali	27	2	21	2	1	0	5	0
5	DF	(Algeria) ALG	Badreddine Souyad	44	4	26	0	3	0	15	4
22	DF	(Algeria) ALG	Walid Bencherifa	48	4	29	2	4	0	15	2
23	DF	(Algeria) ALG	Racim Mebarki	18	0	17	0	0	0	1	0
26	DF	(Algeria) ALG	Ilyes Faiçal Haddouche	8	0	8	0	0	0	0	0
31	MF	(Algeria) ALG	Ahmed Kerroum	49	3	32	1	4	1	13	1
37	MF	(Algeria) ALG	Fares Nechat Djabri	19	0	11	0	3	0	5	0
6	MF	(Algeria) ALG	Ammar El Orfi	30	0	24	0	0	0	6	0
8	MF	(Algeria) ALG	Juba Oukaci	32	1	20	0	2	0	10	1
10	MF	(Algeria) ALG	Abdessamed Bounoua	2	0	0	0	0	0	2	0
13	MF	(Algeria) ALG	Aziz Benabdi	46	2	27	2	4	0	15	0
14	MF	(Libya) LBA	Mohamed Abdussalam Tubal	38	9	25	7	3	2	10	0
16	MF	(Algeria) ALG	Oussama Daibeche	1	0	1	0	0	0	0	0
20	MF	(Algeria) ALG	Juba Aguieb	2	0	2	0	0	0	0	0
21	MF	(Algeria) ALG	Malik Raiah	44	1	28	1	4	0	12	0
10	MF	(Algeria) ALG	Yacine Medane	6	0	5	0	1	0	0	0
20	MF	(Algeria) ALG	Fouad Ghanem	8	0	7	0	1	0	0	0
7	FW	(Algeria) ALG	Mohamed Benchaira	44	1	26	1	4	0	14	0
9	FW	(Algeria) ALG	Mohammed Zakaria Boulahia	38	6	21	3	3	0	14	3
11	FW	(Algeria) ALG	Rezki Hamroune	13	1	0	0	2	1	11	0
15	FW	(Algeria) ALG	Massinissa Nezla	19	5	13	3	2	0	4	2
17	FW	(Algeria) ALG	Rédha Bensayah	47	10	28	5	4	0	15	5
18	FW	(Algeria) ALG	Hadj Habib Saïd Fellahi	5	0	4	0	0	0	1	0
19	FW	(Democratic Republic of the Congo) COD	Glody Kilangalanga	7	0	3	0	0	0	4	0
24	FW	(Algeria) ALG	Chaker Kaddour Chérif	7	0	5	0	0	0	2	0
27	FW	(Algeria) ALG	Merouane Loucif	0	0	0	0	0	0	0	0
48	FW	(Algeria) ALG	Kouceila Boualia	33	5	23	2	4	2	6	1
12	FW	(Algeria) ALG	Ali Haroun	8	1	6	0	2	1	0	0
Players transferred out during the season
12	MF	(Tunisia) TUN	Oussama Darragi	0	0	0	0	0	0	0	0
19	FW	(Kenya) KEN	Masoud Juma	0	0	0	0	0	0	0	0

Last updated: 28 August 2021
Source: fr.soccerway.com

=== Goalscorers ===
Includes all competitive matches. The list is sorted alphabetically by surname when total goals are equal.

No.	Nat.	Player	Pos.	L 1	LC	CC 3	TOTAL
17	(Algeria)	Rédha Bensayah	FW	5	0	5	10
14	(Libya)	Mohamed Abdussalam Tubal	MF	7	2	0	9
11	(Algeria)	Rezki Hamroune	FW	7	1	0	8
9	(Algeria)	Mohammed Zakaria Boulahia	FW	3	0	3	6
15	(Algeria)	Massinissa Nezla	FW	3	0	2	5
	(Algeria)	Kouceila Boualia	FW	2	2	1	5
5	(Algeria)	Badreddine Souyad	DF	0	0	4	4
22	(Algeria)	Walid Bencherifa	DF	2	0	2	4
31	(Algeria)	Ahmed Mohamed Kerroum	DF	1	1	1	3
	(Algeria)	Sid Ahmed Houari	DF	2	0	0	2
4	(Algeria)	Bilal Tizi Bouali	DF	2	0	0	2
13	(Algeria)	Aziz Benabdi	MF	2	0	0	2
21	(Algeria)	Malik Raiah	MF	1	0	0	1
10	(Algeria)	Abdessamed Bounoua	MF	1	0	0	1
7	(Algeria)	Mohamed Benchaira	FW	1	0	0	1
8	(Algeria)	Juba Oukaci	MF	0	0	1	1
2	(Algeria)	Ahmed Ait Abdessalem	DF	1	0	0	1
	(Algeria)	Fouad Ghanem	MF	1	0	0	1
	(Algeria)	Ali Haroun	FW	0	1	0	1
Own Goals				1	0	2	3
Totals				44	7	21	72

== Transfers ==
=== In ===
Date	Pos	Player	From club	Transfer fee	Source
5 August 2020	MF	(Algeria) Mehdi Ferrahi	RC Kouba	Free transfer	
7 August 2020	MF	(Algeria) Houdeifa Arfi	RC Arbaâ	Free transfer	
11 August 2020	FW	(Algeria) Hadj Saïd Fellahi	ASO Chlef	Free transfer	
17 August 2020	DF	(Algeria) Ahmed Kerroum	ASM Oran	Free transfer	
26 August 2020	DF	(Algeria) Abdelmoumen Chikhi	NC Magra	Free transfer	
1 September 2020	GK	(Algeria) Abdelatif Ramdane	MC Alger U21	Free transfer	
28 September 2020	DF	(Algeria) Aziz Benabdi	MO Béjaïa	Free transfer	
5 October 2020	FW	(Algeria) Chaker Kaddour Chérif	ASO Chlef	Free transfer	
31 January 2021	FW	(Democratic Republic of the Congo) Glody Kilangalanga	(Tunisia) CS Chebba	Free transfer	
23 March 2021	AM	(Algeria) Yacine Medane	Olympique de Médéa	Undisclosed	
9 April 2021	ST	(Algeria) Ali Haroun	USM Bel Abbès	Free transfer	
9 April 2021	LW	(Algeria) Fouad Ghanem	CR Belouizdad	Free transfer	

=== Out ===
Date	Pos	Player	To club	Transfer fee	Source
23 August 2020	MF	(Algeria) Abderzak Iratni	Unattached	Free transfer (Released)	
23 August 2020	MF	(Algeria) Toufik Addadi	Unattached (Note: Addadi joined MC Alger on 29 September 2020.)	Free transfer (Released)	
23 August 2020	DF	(Algeria) Toufik Zeghdane	Unattached	Free transfer (Released)	
23 August 2020	DF	(Algeria) Amir Bellaili	Unattached (Note: Bellaili joined AS Ain M'lila on 4 October 2020.)	Free transfer (Released)	
24 September 2020	DF	(Algeria) Nabil Saâdou	Unattached (Note: Saâdou joined MC Alger on 24 September 2020.)	Free transfer (Released)	
6 October 2020	FW	(Algeria) Abdelwahid Belgherbi	USM Bel Abbès	Free transfer	
26 January 2021	FW	(Kenya) Masoud Juma	(Morocco) Difaâ El Jadidi	Free transfer	
