= 2019–20 JS Kabylie season =

JS Kabylie
2019–20 season
- Chairman: Chérif Mellal
- Head coach: Hubert Velud (from 21 June 2019) (until 17 January 2020); Yamen Zalfani (from 27 January 2020)
- Stadium: Stade du 1er Novembre 1954
- Ligue 1: 4th
- Algerian Cup: Round of 64
- Champions League: Group stage
- Top goalscorer: League: Rédha Bensayah (5 goals); All: Hamza Banouh (7 goals)
Home colours	Away colours

In the 2019–20 season, JS Kabylie competed in Ligue 1 for the 51st season, as well as, the Champions League and the Algerian Cup. On March 15, 2020, the Ligue de Football Professionnel (LFP) decided to halt the season due to the COVID-19 pandemic in Algeria. On July 29, 2020, the LFP declared that season is over and CR Belouizdad to be the champion, the promotion of four teams from the League 2, and scraping the relegation for the current season.

== Squad list ==
Players and squad numbers last updated on 15 August 2019.
Note: Flags indicate national team as has been defined under FIFA eligibility rules. Players may hold more than one non-FIFA nationality.

No.	Nat.	Position	Name	Date of Birth (Age)	Signed from
Goalkeepers
1	(Algeria)	GK	Abdelkader Salhi	19 March 1993 (aged 26)	(Algeria) CR Belouizdad
30	(Algeria)	GK	Oussama Benbot	11 October 1994 (aged 25)	(Algeria) Youth system
Defenders
2	(Algeria)	RB	Ahmed Ait Abdessalem	30 August 1997 (aged 22)	(Algeria) Youth system
4	(Algeria)	CB	Bilal Tizi Bouali	14 December 1997 (aged 22)	(Algeria) Youth system
5	(Algeria)	CB	Nabil Saâdou	7 March 1990 (aged 29)	(Algeria) Olympique de Médéa
22	(Algeria)	LB	Walid Bencherifa	6 November 1988 (aged 31)	(Algeria) CS Constantine
25	(Algeria)	RB	Amir Bellaili	10 February 1991 (aged 28)	(Algeria) CR Belouizdad
26	(Algeria)	CB	Badreddine Souyad	3 May 1995 (aged 24)	(Algeria) RC Arbaâ
13	(Algeria)	LB	Toufik Zeghdane	17 September 1992 (aged 27)	(France) Sedan
Midfielders
6	(Algeria)	DM	Ammar El Orfi	3 November 1998 (aged 21)	(Algeria) USM Alger U21
8	(Algeria)	LW	Juba Oukaci	8 July 1996 (aged 23)	(Algeria) Youth system
10	(Algeria)	DM	Abdessamed Bounoua	24 April 1991 (aged 28)	(Algeria) USM Bel Abbès
17	(Algeria)	AM	Anis Renaï	2 February 1997 (aged 22)	(Algeria) Youth system
18	(Algeria)	CM	Toufik Addadi	7 October 1990 (aged 29)	(Algeria) Olympique de Médéa
21	(Algeria)	AM	Abderzak Iratni	21 June 1997 (aged 22)	(Algeria) Youth system
23	(Algeria)	DM	Malik Raiah	20 September 1992 (aged 27)	(Algeria) NA Hussein Dey
Forwards
7	(Algeria)	DM	Mohamed Benchaira	10 January 1992 (aged 27)	(Algeria) AS Ain M'lila
9	(Algeria)	CF	Hamza Banouh	1 May 1990 (aged 29)	(Algeria) ES Sétif
11	(Algeria)	RW	Rezki Hamroune	10 March 1996 (aged 23)	Unattached
20	(Algeria)	AM	Massinissa Tafni	2 April 1995 (aged 24)	(Algeria) Youth system
24	(Algeria)	CF	Abdelwahid Belgherbi	3 February 1990 (aged 29)	(Algeria) JSM Bejaia
28	(Algeria)	LW	Rédha Bensayah	22 August 1994 (aged 25)	(Algeria) JSM Béjaïa
29	(Kenya)	CF	Masoud Juma	3 February 1996 (aged 23)	(Libya) Al-Nasr SC
	(Libya)	CF	Mohamed Tubal Abdussalam	23 June 1993 (aged 26)	(Libya) Al-Ittihad Club
	(Tunisia)	CF	Oussama Darragi	3 April 1987 (aged 32)	(Tunisia) Club Africain

== Pre-season ==
13 July 2019 Friendly	FC Annecy (France)	0 – 1	JS Kabylie	Annecy, France
		Report	Bounoua 45'	Stadium: Parc des sports Annecy

16 July 2019 Friendly	Étoile Fréjus Saint-Raphaël (France)	1 – 0	JS Kabylie	Saint-Raphaël, France
18:00		[ Report]

23 July 2019 Friendly	FC Vevey (France)	0 – 4	JS Kabylie	, France
18:00		Report	Addadi 13' (pen.); Banouh 50'; Belgherbi 76'; Bensayah 80'

24 July 2019 Friendly	GFA Rumilly-Vallières (France)	2 – 1	JS Kabylie	Thonon-les-Bains, France
18:00		Report	Koanda 25'	Stadium: Stade Joseph Moynat

2 August 2019 Friendly	JS Kabylie	1 – 1	CR Belouizdad	Tizi Ouzou
18:00		Report		Stadium: November 1, 1954 Stadium; Attendance: 0 (close doors)

== Competitions ==
=== Overview ===
Competition	Record								Started round	Final position / round	First match	Last match
Competition	G	W	D	L	GF	GA	GD	Win %	Started round	Final position / round	First match	Last match
Ligue 1	22	10	6	6	27	18	+9	45.45	—N/a	4th	15 August 2019	15 March 2020
Algerian Cup	1	0	0	1	0	1	−1	0.00	Round of 64		5 January 2020	
Champions League	10	4	1	5	8	12	−4	40.00	First round	Group stage	9 August 2019	1 February 2020
Total	33	14	7	12	35	31	+4	42.42				

Updated to match played 3 June 2019
Source: Competitions

== League table ==
Pos	Team	Pld	W	D	L	GF	GA	GD	Pts	PPG	Qualification or relegation
2	MC Alger	21	11	4	6	31	25	+6	37	1.76	Qualification for Champions League
3	ES Sétif	22	11	4	7	34	19	+15	37	1.68	Qualification for Confederation Cup
4	JS Kabylie	22	10	6	6	27	18	+9	36	1.64	Qualification for Confederation Cup
5	CS Constantine	22	9	7	6	32	23	+9	34	1.55	
6	USM Alger	21	9	5	7	25	22	+3	32 (Note: USM Alger were deducted 3 points due to their withdrawal in their game against MC Alger. The decision has been appealed to the Court of Arbitration for Sport. On August 28, 2020, after postponing several times the final decision was made without appeal, which is to return the three points and repeat the match.)	1.52	

Updated to match(es) played on 15 March 2020. Source: dzfoot.com
Rules for classification: 1) points; 2) head-to-head points; 3) head-to-head goal difference; 4) goal difference; 5) total goals; 6) fairplay ranking; 7) playoff.

=== Results summary ===
Overall								Home						Away					
Pld	W	D	L	GF	GA	GD	Pts	W	D	L	GF	GA	GD	W	D	L	GF	GA	GD
22	10	6	6	27	18	+9	36	8	2	1	16	6	+10	2	4	5	11	12	−1

Last updated: 22 April 2018.
Source: Competitive matches

=== Results by round ===
Round	1	2	3	4	5	6	7	8	9	10	11	12	13	14	15	16	17	18	19	20	21	22	23	24	25	26	27	28	29	30
Ground	A	H	A	A	H	A	H	A	H	A	H	A	H	A	H	H	A	H	H	A	H	A	H	A	H	A	H	A	H	A
Result	D	W	W	L	L	L	W	L	W	W	D	L	W	D	W	W	D	D	W	L	W	D	C	C	C	C	C	C	C	C
Position	10	4	2	4	6	10	5	8	6	6	6	8	5	5	3	3	2	3	3	4	3	4	4	4	4	4	4	4	4	4

Updated to match(es) played on 22 April 2019. Source: Competitive matches
A = Away; H = Home; W = Win; D = Draw; L = Loss

=== Matches ===
Win Draw Loss

15 August 2019 Round 1	NA Hussein Dey	0–0	JS Kabylie	El Harrach (Note: NA Hussein Dey played their home match against JS Kabylie at November 1, 1954 Stadium, El Harrach, instead of their regular stadium Stade 20 Août 1955, Belouizdad, due to renovation.)
17:00		Soccerway report		Stadium: November 1, 1954 Stadium; Referee: Abdellali Ibrir

19 August 2019 Round 2	JS Kabylie	3–2	US Biskra	Tizi Ouzou
21:00	Addadi 31'; Hamroune 71'; Souyad 80'	Soccerway report	Lakhdari 50'; Messadia 75'	Stadium: Stade 1er Novembre 1954; Referee: Missoum Benabdellah

31 August 2019 Round 3	Paradou AC	0–3	JS Kabylie	Bologhine
20:30		Soccerway report	Banouh 37'; Bensayah 55'; Bounoua 64'	Stadium: Omar Hamadi Stadium; Referee: Abderrezzak Arab

24 September 2019 Round 5	JS Kabylie	0–3 (Note: The match was suspended at 83 minutes due to safety reasons after spectators stormed onto the pitch, CR Belouizdad award winner by 3–0.)	CR Belouizdad	Tizi Ouzou
17:45		Soccerway report	Djerrar 10'; Belahouel 74', 78'	Stadium: Stade 1er Novembre 1954; Referee: Youcef Gamouh

6 October 2019 Round 7	JS Kabylie	1–0	ES Sétif	Bologhine (Note: JS Kabylie played two matches instead of their regular stadium Stade 1er Novembre 1954, Tizi Ouzou, due to sanctions.)
17:45	Oukaci 80'	Soccerway report		Stadium: Omar Hamadi Stadium; Attendance: 0 (close doors); Referee: Mustapha Ghorbal

12 October 2019 Round 4	ASO Chlef	1–0	JS Kabylie	Chlef
17:45	Djahel 22'	Soccerway report		Stadium: Stade Mohamed Boumezrag; Referee: Yazid Ibrir

23 October 2019 Round 8	CS Constantine	3–1	JS Kabylie	Constantine
18:45	Lamri 48'; Zaâlani 57'; Boudebouda 74'	Soccerway report	Bensayah 73'	Stadium: Stade Mohamed Hamlaoui; Referee: Mohamed Saïdi

30 October 2019 Round 9	JS Kabylie	1–0	AS Aïn M'lila	El Harrach
15:00	Banouh 9'	Soccerway report		Stadium: November 1, 1954 Stadium; Attendance: 0 (close doors); Referee: Said Aouina

4 November 2019 Round 6	USM Bel Abbès	2–1	JS Kabylie	Sidi Bel Abbès
18:45	Barka 25'; Belhocini 62'	Soccerway report	Bencherifa 66'	Stadium: Stade 24 Fevrier 1956; Referee: Mehdi Abid Charef

13 November 2019 Round 10	MC Alger	0–3	JS Kabylie	Algiers
18:45		Soccerway report	Belgherbi 50'; Hamroune 68' (pen.); Bensayah 90+1'	Stadium: July 5, 1962 Stadium; Referee: Abdelali Ibrir

23 November 2019 Round 11	JS Kabylie	0–0	JS Saoura	Tizi Ouzou
16:00		Soccerway report		Stadium: Stade 1er Novembre 1954; Attendance: 0 (close doors); Referee: Abderrezzak Arab

16 December 2019 Round 14	CA Bordj Bou Arreridj	1–1	JS Kabylie	Bordj Bou Arréridj
15:00	Belameiri 46'	Soccerway report	Tafni 20'	Stadium: August 20, 1955 Stadium; Attendance: 0 (close doors); Referee: Lahlou Benbraham

21 December 2019 Round 15	JS Kabylie	3–0	NC Magra	Tizi Ouzou
16:00	Hamroune 62'; Banouh 67', 78'	Soccerway report		Stadium: Stade 1er Novembre 1954; Attendance: 0 (close doors); Referee: Houssam Benyahia

16 January 2020 Round 12	USM Alger	1–0	JS Kabylie	Bologhine
18:45	Mahious 30' (pen.)	Soccerway report		Stadium: Omar Hamadi Stadium; Referee: Abdelali Ibrir

20 January 2020 Round 13	JS Kabylie	1–0	MC Oran	Tizi Ouzou
16:00	Saâdou 33'	Soccerway report		Stadium: Stade 1er Novembre 1954; Attendance: 0 (close doors); Referee: Said Aouina

5 February 2020 Round 16	JS Kabylie	1–0	NA Hussein Dey	Tizi Ouzou
18:45	Belaïd 38' (o.g.)	Soccerway report		Stadium: Stade 1er Novembre 1954; Referee: Houssam Benyahia

9 February 2020 Round 17	US Biskra	1–1	JS Kabylie	Biskra
16:00	Bouafia 72'	Soccerway report	Bensayah 45+3'	Stadium: Stade du 18 Février; Attendance: 0 (close doors); Referee: Mehdi Abid Charef

17 February 2020 Round 18	JS Kabylie	0–0	Paradou AC	Tizi Ouzou
17:00		Soccerway report		Stadium: Stade 1er Novembre 1954; Referee: Mustapha Ghorbal

22 February 2020 Round 19	JS Kabylie	4–1	ASO Chlef	Tizi Ouzou
16:00	Belgherbi 13'; Bensayah 24'; Bencherifa 55'; Al-Tubal 74'	Soccerway report	Boulaouidet 43'	Stadium: Stade 1er Novembre 1954; Referee: Amine Sekhraoui

29 February 2020 Round 20	CR Belouizdad	3–1	JS Kabylie	Belouizdad
15:00	Belahouel 11' (pen.); Bouchar 42'; Souibaâh 45+2'	Soccerway report	Mebarki 71' (pen.)	Stadium: Stade 20 Août 1955; Referee: Youcef Gamouh

5 March 2020 Round 21	JS Kabylie	2–0	USM Bel Abbès	Tizi Ouzou
16:00	Belgherbi 8', 72'	Soccerway report		Stadium: Stade 1er Novembre 1954; Referee: Rafik Achouri

15 March 2020 Round 22	ES Sétif	0–0	JS Kabylie	Sétif
17:00		Soccerway report		Stadium: Stade 8 Mai 1945; Attendance: 0 (close doors); Referee: Hamza Bouslimani
Note: due to coronavirus outbreak, Ministry of Health, Population and Hospital Reform decided to be all matches played behind closed doors.

Round 23	JS Kabylie	Cancelled	CS Constantine	Tizi Ouzou
				Stadium: Stade 1er Novembre 1954

Round 24	AS Aïn M'lila	Cancelled	JS Kabylie	Aïn M'lila
				Stadium: Touhami Zoubir Khelifi Stadium

Round 25	JS Kabylie	Cancelled	MC Alger	Tizi Ouzou
				Stadium: Stade 1er Novembre 1954

Round 26	JS Saoura	Cancelled	JS Kabylie	Béchar
				Stadium: Stade 20 Août 1955

Round 27	JS Kabylie	Cancelled	USM Alger	Tizi Ouzou
				Stadium: Stade 1er Novembre 1954

Round 28	MC Oran	Cancelled	JS Kabylie	Oran
				Stadium: Ahmed Zabana Stadium

Round 29	JS Kabylie	Cancelled	CA Bordj Bou Arreridj	Tizi Ouzou
				Stadium: Stade 1er Novembre 1954

Round 30	NC Magra	Cancelled	JS Kabylie	Magra
				Stadium: Boucheligue Brothers Stadium

== Algerian Cup ==
5 January 2020 Round of 64	AS Ain M'lila	1–0 (a.e.t.)	JS Kabylie	Aïn M'lila
14:00	Tiaiba 95' (pen.)	Report		Stadium: Touhami Zoubir Khelifi Stadium; Referee: Lotfi Bekouassa
Note: Lineup for JS Kabylie - Benbot, Bellaili, Souyad, Saâdou, Zeghdane (Ait Abdessalem, 79'), Iratni (Loucif, 25', Mebarki, 106'), Bounoua, Raiah, Addadi, Bensayah, Belgherbi (Banouh, 73')

== Champions League ==
=== Preliminary round ===
9 August 2019 First leg	JS Kabylie (Algeria)	1–0	(Sudan) Al-Merrikh	Béjaïa
20:45 UTC+1	Bensayah 43'	Report		Stadium: Stade de l'Unité Maghrébine; Referee: Mohamed Maarouf (Egypt)
Note: Lineup for JS Kabylie - Benbot, Tizi Bouali, Saadou, Belaili, Bencherifa, Bounoua, Addadi, Hamroune, Bensayah, Belgherbi (Bennouh 75'), Benchaira

24 August 2019 Second leg	Al-Merrikh (Sudan)	3–2	(Algeria) JS Kabylie	Omdurman
18:30 UTC+2	Almadina 44' (pen.), 74'; Ibrahim 56'	Report	Banouh 91'; Addadi 90+4' (pen.)	Stadium: Al-Merrikh Stadium; Referee: Belay Tadesse (Ethiopia)
Note: Lineup for JS Kabylie - Benbot, Ait Abdelsslam, Souyed, Saadou, Zeghdane (Bounoua, 80') - Bencherifa, Benchaira, Addadi - Hamroune, Belgherbi (Banouh, 76'), Bensayeh (Tafni, 76')

=== First round ===
14 September 2019 First leg	JS Kabylie (Algeria)	2–0	(Guinea) Horoya	Tizi Ouzou
19:30 UTC+1	Banouh 52', 67'	Report		Stadium: Stade 1er Novembre 1954; Referee: Mehrez Melki (Tunisia)
Note: Lineup for JS Kabylie - Benbot, Mebarki, Bencherifa, Saâdou, Souyed, Benchaïra, Bounoua, Addadi (Oukaci 76’) Bensaye, hHamroun (Zeghdane 90’) Banouh, (Belgherbi 85’)

29 September 2019 Second leg	Horoya (Guinea)	2–0 (3–5 p)	(Algeria) JS Kabylie	Conakry
16:00 UTC+0	Bancé 80'; Makambo 90+1'	Report		Stadium: Stade du 28 Septembre; Referee: Samir Guezzaz (Morocco)
	Penalties
	Makambo (penalty missed); Nikièma (penalty scored); Kutinyu (penalty scored); Hudu (penalty scored)		(penalty scored) Addadi; (penalty scored) Oukaci; (penalty scored) Bellaili; (penalty scored) Zeghdane; (penalty scored) Bencherifa
Note: Lineup for JS Kabylie - Salhi - Belaili, Souyed, Saadou, Bencherifa - Benchaira, Oukaci, Addadi - Hamroune, Belgherbi, Bensayah

=== Group stage ===
==== Group C ====
Pos	Team	Pld	W	D	L	GF	GA	GD	Pts	Qualification	EST	RCA	JSK	VIT
1	(Tunisia) Espérance de Tunis	6	3	2	1	7	3	+4	11 (Note: Head-to-head points: Espérance de Tunis 4, Raja Casablanca 1.)	Advance to knockout stage	—	2–2	1–0	0–0
2	(Morocco) Raja Casablanca	6	3	2	1	6	4	+2	11	Advance to knockout stage	0–2	—	2–0	1–0
3	(Algeria) JS Kabylie	6	2	1	3	3	7	−4	7		1–0	0–0	—	1–0
4	(Democratic Republic of the Congo) AS Vita Club	6	1	1	4	4	6	−2	4		0–2	0–1	4–1	—

Source: CAF
Notes:

29 November 2019 Matchday 1	JS Kabylie (Algeria)	1–0	(Democratic Republic of the Congo) AS Vita Club	Tizi Ouzou, Algeria
17:00 UTC+1	Addadi 66'	Report		Stadium: Stade du 1er Novembre 1954; Referee: Ahmad Heeralall (Mauritius)

6 December 2019 Matchday 2	Espérance de Tunis (Tunisia)	1–0	(Algeria) JS Kabylie	Radès, Tunisia
20:00 UTC+1	Badri 73' (pen.)	Report		Stadium: Stade Olympique de Radès; Referee: Maguette N'Diaye (Senegal)

27 December 2019 Matchday 3	Raja Casablanca (Morocco)	2–0	(Algeria) JS Kabylie	Casablanca, Morocco
20:00 UTC+1	Malango 51'; Rahimi 54'	Report		Stadium: Stade Mohammed V Referee: Mohamed Maarouf (Egypt)

10 January 2020 Matchday 4	JS Kabylie (Algeria)	0–0	(Morocco) Raja Casablanca	Tizi Ouzou, Algeria
17:00 UTC+1		Report		Stadium: Stade du 1er Novembre 1954; Referee: Louis Hakizimana (Rwanda)

25 January 2020 Matchday 5	AS Vita Club (Democratic Republic of the Congo)	4–1	(Algeria) JS Kabylie	Kinshasa, Congo DR
17:00 UTC+1	Shabani 24' (pen.); Bangala 55'; Luzolo 67'; Mayele 70'	Report	Hamroune 31'	Stadium: Stade des Martyrs; Referee: Bernard Camille (Seychelles)

1 February 2020 Matchday 6	JS Kabylie (Algeria)	1–0	(Tunisia) Espérance de Tunis	Tizi Ouzou, Algeria
17:00 UTC+1	Hamroune 56'	Report		Stadium: Stade du 1er Novembre 1954; Referee: Amin Omar (Egypt)

== Squad information ==
=== Playing statistics ===
No.	Pos	Nat	Player	Total		Ligue 1		Algerian Cup		Champions League	
No.	Pos	Nat	Player	Apps	Goals	Apps	Goals	Apps	Goals	Apps	Goals
1	GK	(Algeria) ALG	Abdelkader Salhi	4	0	3	0	0	0	1	0
30	GK	(Algeria) ALG	Oussama Benbot	28	0	18	0	1	0	9	0
2	DF	(Algeria) ALG	Ahmed Ait Abdessalem	12	0	9	0	1	0	2	0
4	DF	(Algeria) ALG	Bilal Tizi Bouali	7	0	4	0	0	0	3	0
5	DF	(Algeria) ALG	Nabil Saâdou	29	1	18	1	1	0	10	0
22	DF	(Algeria) ALG	Walid Bencherifa	20	2	12	2	0	0	8	0
25	DF	(Algeria) ALG	Amir Bellaili	20	0	13	0	1	0	6	0
26	DF	(Algeria) ALG	Badreddine Souyad	27	1	19	1	1	0	7	0
13	DF	(Algeria) ALG	Toufik Zeghdane	24	0	17	0	1	0	6	0
	DF	(Algeria) ALG	Racim Mebarki	12	1	8	1	1	0	3	0
	DF	(Algeria) ALG	Nassim Mekidèche	2	0	2	0	0	0	0	0
6	MF	(Algeria) ALG	Ammar El Orfi	11	0	8	0	0	0	3	0
8	MF	(Algeria) ALG	Juba Oukaci	10	1	8	1	0	0	2	0
10	MF	(Algeria) ALG	Abdessamed Bounoua	23	1	14	1	1	0	8	0
17	MF	(Algeria) ALG	Lyes Renai	2	0	1	0	0	0	1	0
18	MF	(Algeria) ALG	Toufik Addadi	27	3	16	1	1	0	10	2
21	MF	(Algeria) ALG	Abderzak Iratni	5	0	3	0	1	0	1	0
	MF	(Algeria) ALG	Younes Bouakil	0	0	0	0	0	0	0	0
23	MF	(Algeria) ALG	Malik Raiah	13	0	8	0	1	0	4	0
	MF	(Algeria) ALG	Merouane Loucif	2	0	1	0	1	0	0	0
7	FW	(Algeria) ALG	Mohamed Benchaira	22	0	15	0	0	0	7	0
9	FW	(Algeria) ALG	Hamza Banouh	22	7	13	4	1	0	8	3
11	FW	(Algeria) ALG	Rezki Hamroune	28	6	18	4	0	0	10	2
20	FW	(Algeria) ALG	Massinissa Tafni	12	1	8	1	0	0	4	0
24	FW	(Algeria) ALG	Abdelwahid Belgherbi	22	4	14	4	1	0	7	0
28	FW	(Algeria) ALG	Rédha Bensayah	32	6	21	5	1	0	10	1
	FW	(Algeria) ALG	Ghiles Belkacemi	0	0	0	0	0	0	0	0
12	FW	(Algeria) ALG	Zakaria Boulahia	3	0	2	0	0	0	1	0
29	FW	(Kenya) KEN	Masoud Juma	12	0	10	0	0	0	2	0
	FW	(Libya) LBA	Mohamed Tubal Abdussalam	4	1	4	1	0	0	0	0
	FW	(Tunisia) TUN	Oussama Darragi	6	0	6	0	0	0	0	0
Players transferred out during the season

Last updated: 8 June 2019
Source: fr.soccerway.com

=== Goalscorers ===
Includes all competitive matches. The list is sorted alphabetically by surname when total goals are equal.

No.	Nat.	Player	Pos.	L 1	AC	CL 1	TOTAL
9	(Algeria)	Hamza Banouh	FW	4	0	3	7
11	(Algeria)	Rezki Hamroune	FW	4	0	2	6
28	(Algeria)	Rédha Bensayah	FW	5	0	1	6
24	(Algeria)	Abdelwahid Belgherbi	FW	4	0	0	4
18	(Algeria)	Toufik Addadi	MF	1	0	2	3
22	(Algeria)	Walid Bencherifa	DF	2	0	0	2
5	(Algeria)	Nabil Saâdou	DF	1	0	0	1
26	(Algeria)	Badreddine Souyad	DF	1	0	0	1
	(Algeria)	Racim Mebarki	DF	1	0	0	1
8	(Algeria)	Juba Oukaci	MF	1	0	0	1
10	(Algeria)	Abdessamed Bounoua	MF	1	0	0	1
20	(Algeria)	Massinissa Tafni	FW	1	0	0	1
	(Libya)	Mohamed Tubal Abdussalam	FW	1	0	0	1
Own Goals				0	0	0	0
Totals				27	0	8	35

== Transfers ==
=== In ===
Date	Pos	Player	from club	Transfer fee	Source
1 June 2019	FW	(Algeria) Toufik Addadi	Olympique de Médéa	Free transfer	
7 June 2019	FW	(Algeria) Hamza Banouh	ES Sétif	Free transfer	
12 June 2019	FW	(Algeria) Rédha Bensayah	JSM Béjaïa	Free transfer	
18 June 2019	MF	(Algeria) Ammar El Orfi	USM Alger U21	Free transfer	
20 June 2019	MF	(Algeria) Abdessamed Bounoua	USM Bel Abbès	Free transfer	
27 June 2019	MF	(Algeria) Mohamed Walid Bencherifa	CS Constantine	Free transfer	
1 July 2019	MF	(Algeria) Salim Boukhenchouche	MO Béjaïa	Loan return	
3 July 2019	MF	(Algeria) Toufik Zeghdane	(France) Sedan	Free transfer	
28 July 2019	FW	(Kenya) Masoud Juma	(Libya) Al-Nasr SC	Free transfer	
15 November 2019	FW	(Libya) Mohamed Tubal Abdussalam	(Libya) Al-Ittihad Club	Free transfer	
8 January 2020	FW	(Tunisia) Oussama Darragi	(Tunisia) Club Africain	Free transfer	
13 January 2020	FW	(Algeria) Zakaria Boulahia	(Spain) Albacete Balompié II	Free transfer	

=== Out ===
Date	Pos	Player	To club	Transfer fee	Source
30 June 2019	FW	(Nigeria) Uche Nwofor	Unattached	Free transfer (Released)	
30 June 2019	MF	(Algeria) Mohamed Amine Kabari	Unattached	Free transfer (Released)	
2 July 2019	MF	(Algeria) Ilyes Chetti	(Tunisia) Espérance ST	175,000 $	
13 July 2019	MF	(Algeria) Salim Boukhenchouche	(Tunisia) ES Sahel	Undisclosed	
