= 2018–19 JS Kabylie season =

JS Kabylie
2017–18 season
- Chairman: Chérif Mellal
- Head coach: Franck Dumas (from 12 July 2018)
- Stadium: Stade du 1er Novembre 1954
- Ligue 1: Runners–up
- Algerian Cup: Round of 64
- Top goalscorer: League: Rezki Hamroune (9); All: Rezki Hamroune (9)

In the 2018–19 season, JS Kabylie competed in the Ligue 1 for the 48th season, as well as the Algerian Cup.

== Pre-season ==
Following the conclusion of the 2018–19 campaign, JS Kabylie announced they would play Saarbrücken, Hertha Wiesbach, Hamm Benfica and FV Lebach in July 2018.

17 July 2018 Friendly	Saarbrücken (Germany)	3-2	(Algeria) JS Kabylie
18:00 UTC+2

18 July 2018 Friendly	Hertha Wiesbach (Germany)	1-2	(Algeria) JS Kabylie
19:00 UTC+2

22 July 2018 Friendly	Hamm Benfica (Luxembourg)	0-2	(Algeria) JS Kabylie
16:00 UTC+2

26 July 2018 Friendly	FV Lebach (Germany)	-	(Algeria) JS Kabylie
19:00 UTC+2

== Mid-season ==
=== Overview ===
Competition	Record								Started round	Final position / round	First match	Last match
Competition	G	W	D	L	GF	GA	GD	Win %	Started round	Final position / round	First match	Last match
Ligue 1	30	15	7	8	38	25	+13	50.00	—N/a	Runners–up	11 August 2018	26 May 2019
Algerian Cup	1	0	0	1	0	2	−2	0.00	Round of 64		18 December 2018	
Total	31	15	7	9	38	27	+11	48.39				

Updated to match played 28 May 2019
Source: Competitions

== League table ==
Pos	Team	Pld	W	D	L	GF	GA	GD	Pts	Qualification or relegation
1	USM Alger (C)	30	15	8	7	49	29	+20	53	Qualification for Champions League
2	JS Kabylie	30	15	7	8	38	25	+13	52	Qualification for Champions League
3	Paradou AC	30	14	6	10	38	24	+14	48	Qualification for Confederation Cup
4	JS Saoura	30	13	8	9	33	22	+11	47	Qualification for Arab Club Champions Cup
5	ES Sétif	30	13	6	11	34	24	+10	45	

Source: DZFoot
Rules for classification: 1) points; 2) head-to-head points; 3) head-to-head goal difference; 4) goal difference; 5) total goals; 6) fairplay ranking; 7) playoff.
(C) Champions

=== Results summary ===
Overall								Home						Away					
Pld	W	D	L	GF	GA	GD	Pts	W	D	L	GF	GA	GD	W	D	L	GF	GA	GD
30	15	10	5	42	28	+14	55	10	4	1	24	12	+12	5	6	4	18	16	+2

Last updated: 28 May 2018.
Source: Competitive matches

=== Results by round ===
Round	1	2	3	4	5	6	7	8	9	10	11	12	13	14	15	16	17	18	19	20	21	22	23	24	25	26	27	28	29	30
Ground	H	A	H	A	H	A	H	A	H	H	A	H	A	H	A	A	H	A	H	A	H	A	H	A	A	H	A	H	A	H
Result	D	D	W	D	W	W	W	W	D	W	D	L	L	W	L	W	W	W	D	L	D	L	W	L	L	W	L	W	W	W
Position	10	9	4	7	3	1	1	2	2	2	1	2	3	2	2	2	2	2	2	2	2	2	2	3	3	3	3	2	2	2

Updated to match(es) played on 26 May 2019. Source: Competitive matches
A = Away; H = Home; W = Win; D = Draw; L = Loss

=== Matches ===
Win Draw Loss

11 August 2018 Round 1	JS Kabylie	0–0	JS Saoura	Tizi Ouzou
19:00		Soccerway report		Stadium: November 1, 1954 Stadium; Attendance: 0 (close doors); Referee: Mohamed Saïdi

17 August 2018 Round 2	MO Béjaïa	1–1	JS Kabylie	Béjaïa
17:45	Kadri 9'	Soccerway report	Benaldjia 24' (pen.)	Stadium: Stade de l'Unité Maghrébine; Referee: Said Aouina

28 August 2018 Round 3	JS Kabylie	3–1	USM Bel Abbès	Tizi Ouzou
17:45	Benyoucef 45+3' (pen.); Abdul Razak 67', 90+3'	Soccerway report	Aït Fergane 43'	Stadium: November 1, 1954 Stadium; Referee: Rafik Achouri

1 September 2018 Round 4	AS Ain M'lila	0–0	JS Kabylie	Batna
17:00		Soccerway report		Stadium: November 1, 1954 Stadium; Referee: Mustapha Ghorbal

11 September 2018 Round 5	JS Kabylie	1–0	Paradou AC	Tizi Ouzou
17:45	Hamroune 85'	Soccerway report		Stadium: November 1, 1954 Stadium; Referee: Mohamed Saïdi

16 September 2018 Round 6	MC Alger	0–5	JS Kabylie	Bologhine
17:00		Soccerway report	Nwofor 9', 90'; Benyoucef 12'; Abdul Razak 33'; Chetti 70'	Stadium: Omar Hamadi Stadium; Attendance: 0 (close doors); Referee: Redouane Necib

21 September 2018 Round 7	JS Kabylie	2–0	CR Belouizdad	Tizi Ouzou
17:00	Benaldjia 45+2' (pen.); Nwofor 72'	Soccerway report		Stadium: November 1, 1954 Stadium; Referee: Boubekeur Zouaoui

27 September 2018 Round 8	ES Sétif	0–1	JS Kabylie	Sétif
19:00		Soccerway report	Benyoucef 76'	Stadium: Stade 8 Mai 1945; Referee: Mehdi Abid Charef

5 October 2018 Round 9	JS Kabylie	1–1	Olympique de Médéa	Tizi Ouzou
17:45	Belaïli 66'	Soccerway report	Chekhrit 55'	Stadium: November 1, 1954 Stadium; Referee: Nabil Boukhalfa

9 October 2018 Round 10	JS Kabylie	3–2	DRB Tadjenanet	Tizi Ouzou
17:45	Tafni 10', 37'; Hamroune 85'	Soccerway report	Aribi 16'; Attouche 88'	Stadium: November 1, 1954 Stadium; Referee: Hamza Bouslimani

19 October 2018 Round 11	MC Oran	0–0	JS Kabylie	Oran
17:45		Soccerway report		Stadium: Ahmed Zabana Stadium; Referee: Mehdi Abid Charef

9 November 2018 Round 13	USM Alger	1–0	JS Kabylie	Bologhine
17:45	Yaya 49'	Soccerway report		Stadium: Omar Hamadi Stadium; Referee: Mustapha Ghorbal

13 November 2018 Round 14	JS Kabylie	2–1	NA Hussein Dey	Tizi Ouzou
17:45	Nwofor 22'; Hamroune 74'	Soccerway report	Dib 47'	Stadium: November 1, 1954 Stadium; Referee: Mohamed Saïdi

19 November 2018 Round 12	JS Kabylie	0–2	CS Constantine	Tizi Ouzou
17:45		Soccerway report	Beldjilali 22'; Lamri 49'	Stadium: November 1, 1954 Stadium; Referee: Nabil Boukhalfa

23 November 2018 Round 15	CA Bordj Bou Arreridj	1–0	JS Kabylie	Bordj Bou Arréridj
16:00	Mellel 8' (pen.)	Soccerway report		Stadium: Stade 20 Août 1955; Attendance: 0 (close doors); Referee: Mustapha Bessiri

4 January 2019 Round 16	JS Saoura	0–1	JS Kabylie	Béchar
18:00		Soccerway report	Fiston 52'	Stadium: Stade 20 Août 1955; Referee: Mohamed Saïdi

11 January 2019 Round 17	JS Kabylie	1–0	MO Béjaïa	Tizi Ouzou
17:45	Hamroune 16'	Soccerway report		Stadium: November 1, 1954 Stadium; Referee: Lotfi Bekouassa

19 January 2019 Round 18	USM Bel Abbès	0–2	JS Kabylie	Sidi Bel Abbès
16:00		Soccerway report	Hamroune 44'; Belgherbi 68'	Stadium: Stade 24 Fevrier 1956; Referee: Redouane Necib

25 January 2019 Round 19	JS Kabylie	1–1	AS Ain M'lila	Tizi Ouzou
17:45	Bellaili 83'	Soccerway report	Mahious 81'	Stadium: November 1, 1954 Stadium; Attendance: 0 (close doors); Referee: Lyés Bekouassa

4 February 2019 Round 20	Paradou AC	2–0	JS Kabylie	Bologhine
17:45	Naidji 72', 85'	Soccerway report		Stadium: Omar Hamadi Stadium; Referee: Rafik Achouri

9 February 2019 Round 21	JS Kabylie	1–1	MC Alger	Tizi Ouzou
17:45	Saâdou 67'	Soccerway report	Frioui 44'	Stadium: November 1, 1954 Stadium; Referee: Mohamed Saïdi

13 February 2019 Round 22	CR Belouizdad	2–1	JS Kabylie	Belouizdad
15:00	Nessakh 45'; Djerrar 80'	Soccerway report	Nessakh 6' (o.g.)	Stadium: Stade 20 Août 1955; Referee: Nabil Boukhalfa

2 March 2019 Round 23	JS Kabylie	1–0	ES Sétif	Tizi Ouzou
17:45	Abdul Razak 59'	Soccerway report		Stadium: November 1, 1954 Stadium; Referee: Said Aouina

17 March 2019 Round 24	Olympique de Médéa	1–0	JS Kabylie	Médéa
15:00	Addadi 90+4' (pen.)	Soccerway report		Stadium: Stade Imam Lyes de Médéa; Referee: Lyés Bekouassa

1 April 2019 Round 25	DRB Tadjenanet	2–1	JS Kabylie	Tadjenanet
18:00	Taib 27'; Bensaha 72' (pen.)	Soccerway report	Hamroune 76'	Stadium: Lahoua Smaïl Stadium; Referee: Mohamed Saïdi

21 April 2019 Round 26	JS Kabylie	4–2	MC Oran	Tizi Ouzou
16:00	Abdul Razak 3', 58'; Chetti 43'; Hamroune 45+2'	Soccerway report	Mansouri 12' (pen.), 81' (pen.)	Stadium: November 1, 1954 Stadium; Referee: Said Aouina

11 May 2019 Round 27	CS Constantine	2–0	JS Kabylie	Constantine
22:30	Abid 26'; Benayada 44'	Soccerway report		Stadium: Stade Mohamed Hamlaoui; Attendance: 0 (close doors); Referee: Ali Nader

16 May 2019 Round 28	JS Kabylie	2–1	USM Alger	Tizi Ouzou
22:30	Belgherbi 5'; Hamroune 68'	Soccerway report	Ellafi 28'	Stadium: November 1, 1954 Stadium; Referee: Lahlou Benbraham

21 May 2019 Round 29	NA Hussein Dey	1–2	JS Kabylie	Belouizdad
22:30	El Orfi 77'	Soccerway report	Belgherbi 64', 82'	Stadium: Stade 20 Août 1955; Referee: Ahmed Bouzrar

26 May 2019 Round 30	JS Kabylie	2–0	CA Bordj Bou Arreridj	Tizi Ouzou
22:30	Hamroune 38' (pen.); Belgherbi 54'	Soccerway report		Stadium: November 1, 1954 Stadium; Referee: Rafik Achouri

== Algerian Cup ==
18 December 2018 Round of 64	ARB Ghriss	2–0	JS Kabylie	Mascara
14:00	Daoudi 52'; Hamsas 87'	[ Report]		Stadium: Stade Laoucedj Boudjelel; Referee: Fasih, Sadi, Guessmoum

== Squad information ==
=== Playing statistics ===
No.	Pos	Nat	Player	Total		Ligue 1		Algerian Cup	
No.	Pos	Nat	Player	Apps	Goals	Apps	Goals	Apps	Goals
1	GK	(Algeria) ALG	Abdelkader Salhi	29	0	28	0	1	0
30	GK	(Algeria) ALG	Oussama Benbot	2	0	2	0	0	0
2	DF	(Algeria) ALG	Ahmed Ait Abdessalem	9	0	9	0	0	0
4	DF	(Algeria) ALG	Bilal Tizi Bouali	22	0	21	0	1	0
5	DF	(Algeria) ALG	Nabil Saâdou	28	1	27	1	1	0
9	DF	(Algeria) ALG	Amir Bellaili	24	2	23	2	1	0
13	DF	(Algeria) ALG	Samy Slama	6	0	6	0	0	0
26	DF	(Algeria) ALG	Badreddine Souyad	13	0	13	0	0	0
	DF	(Algeria) ALG	Nassim Mekidèche	1	0	1	0	0	0
	DF	(Algeria) ALG	Mouhoub Nait Merabet	5	0	5	0	0	0
6	MF	(Algeria) ALG	Lyes Benyoucef	21	3	20	3	1	0
8	MF	(Algeria) ALG	Taher Benkhelifa	29	0	28	0	1	0
21	MF	(Algeria) ALG	Abderzak Iratni	7	0	7	0	0	0
22	MF	(Algeria) ALG	Lyes Renai	14	0	14	0	0	0
23	MF	(Algeria) ALG	Ilyes Chetti	30	2	29	2	1	0
27	MF	(Algeria) ALG	Juba Oukaci	21	0	20	0	1	0
	MF	(Algeria) ALG	Mohamed Benchaira	15	0	15	0	0	0
	MF	(Algeria) ALG	Mohamed Amine Kabari	1	0	1	0	0	0
	MF	(Algeria) ALG	Ahmed Zaouche	1	0	1	0	0	0
10	FW	(Burundi) BDI	Fiston Abdul Razak	22	7	21	7	1	0
11	FW	(Algeria) ALG	Rezki Hamroune	29	9	28	9	1	0
18	FW	(Algeria) ALG	Ghiles Belkacemi	13	0	12	0	1	0
19	FW	(Nigeria) NGR	Uche Nwofor	20	4	19	4	1	0
20	FW	(Algeria) ALG	Massinissa Tafni	23	2	22	2	1	0
29	FW	(Algeria) ALG	Kacem Amaouche	12	0	12	0	0	0
	FW	(Algeria) ALG	Massinissa Nezla	1	0	1	0	0	0
	FW	(Algeria) ALG	Abdelouahid Belgherbi	13	5	13	5	0	0
Players transferred out during the season
7	MF	(Algeria) ALG	Mehdi Benaldjia	9	2	9	2	0	0
17	MF	(Algeria) ALG	Salim Boukhenchouche	6	0	6	0	0	0

Last updated: 8 June 2019
Source: fr.soccerway.com

=== Goalscorers ===
Includes all competitive matches. The list is sorted alphabetically by surname when total goals are equal.

No.	Nat.	Player	Pos.	L 1	AC	TOTAL
11	(Algeria)	Rezki Hamroune	FW	9	0	9
10	(Burundi)	Fiston Abdul Razak	FW	7	0	7
	(Algeria)	Abdelouahid Belgherbi	FW	5	0	5
19	(Nigeria)	Uche Nwofor	FW	4	0	4
6	(Algeria)	Lyes Benyoucef	MF	3	0	3
7	(Algeria)	Mehdi Benaldjia	MF	2	0	2
23	(Algeria)	Ilyes Chetti	MF	2	0	2
9	(Algeria)	Amir Bellaili	DF	2	0	2
20	(Algeria)	Massinissa Tafni	FW	2	0	2
5	(Algeria)	Nabil Saâdou	DF	1	0	1
Own Goals				1	0	1
Totals				38	0	38

== Squad list ==
As of August 11, 2018. Note: Flags indicate national team as defined under FIFA eligibility rules; some limited exceptions apply. Players may hold more than one non-FIFA nationality.

No.	Pos.	Nation	Player
1	GK	ALG	Abdelkader Salhi
2	DF	ALG	Ahmed Ait Abdessalem
3	DF	ALG	Makhlouf Naït Rabah
4	DF	ALG	Bilal Tizi Bouali
5	DF	ALG	Nabil Saâdou (captain)
6	MF	ALG	Lyes Benyoucef
7	MF	ALG	Mehdi Benaldjia
8	MF	ALG	Taher Benkhelifa
9	DF	ALG	Amir Bellaili
10	FW	BDI	Fiston Abdul Razak
11	FW	ALG	Rezki Hamroune
13	DF	ALG	Samy Slama
14	MF	ALG	Mohamed Amine Ouguenoune
15	MF	ALG	Karim Ait Idir

No.	Pos.	Nation	Player
17	MF	ALG	Salim Boukhenchouche
18	FW	ALG	Ghiles Belkacemi
19	FW	NGR	Uche Nwofor
20	FW	ALG	Massinissa Tafni
21	MF	ALG	Abderzak Iratni
22	MF	ALG	Lyes Renai
23	MF	ALG	Ilyes Chetti
24	DF	ALG	Smail Meziane
25	DF	ALG	Ramdane Ferguene
26	DF	ALG	Badreddine Souyad
27	MF	ALG	Juba Oukaci
29	FW	ALG	Kacem Amaouche
30	GK	ALG	Oussama Benbot

== Transfers ==
=== In ===
Date	Pos	Player	From club	Transfer fee	Source
31 May 2018	MF	(Algeria) Tahar Benkhelifa	Paradou AC	Free transfer	
31 May 2018	DF	(Algeria) Badreddine Souyad	RC Arbaâ	Free transfer	
4 June 2018	GK	(Algeria) Abdelkader Salhi	CR Belouizdad	Free transfer	
8 June 2018	DF	(Algeria) Samy Slama	(Norway) Drøbak-Frogn IL	Free transfer	
8 June 2018	FW	(Algeria) Kacem Amaouche	(France) Besançon Football	Free transfer	
10 June 2018	GK	(Algeria) Oussama Benbot	AS Ain M'lila	Free transfer	
11 June 2018	MF	(Algeria) Rezki Hamroune	(France) AS Apollinaire	Free transfer	
11 June 2018	DF	(Algeria) Amir Belaïli	CR Belouizdad	Free transfer	
13 June 2018	MF	(Guinea) Mohamed Thiam	(Guinea) AS Kaloum Star	Free transfer	
19 June 2018	FW	(Nigeria) Uche Nwofor	Unattached	Free transfer	
27 June 2018	MF	(Algeria) Abdellah El Moudene	MC Alger	Free transfer	
8 August 2018	FW	(Burundi) Abdul Razak Fiston	(Iraq) Al-Zawra'a SC	Free transfer	
12 December 2018	MF	(Algeria) Mohamed Amine Kabari	US Biskra	Free transfer	
23 December 2018	MF	(Algeria) Mohamed Benchaira	AS Ain M'lila	Free transfer	
23 December 2018	FW	(Algeria) Abdelouahid Belgherbi	JSM Béjaïa	Free transfer	
15 January 2019	MF	(Algeria) Mouhoub Naït Merabet	CA Bordj Bou Arreridj	Free transfer	

=== Out ===
Date	Pos	Player	To club	Transfer fee	Source
25 May 2018	DF	(Algeria) Saâdi Radouani	ES Sétif	Free transfer	
27 May 2018	DF	(Algeria) Houari Ferhani	ES Sétif	Free transfer	
5 June 2018	MF	(Algeria) Malik Raiah	NA Hussein Dey	Free transfer	
6 June 2018	GK	(Algeria) Abderrahmane Boultif	ES Sétif	Free transfer	
8 June 2018	MF	(Algeria) Nassim Yettou	MC Oran	Free transfer	
11 June 2018	GK	(Algeria) Malik Asselah	(Saudi Arabia) Al-Hazem	Free transfer (Released)	
14 June 2018	FW	(Algeria) Adil Djabout	CS Constantine	Free transfer (Released)	
22 June 2018	MF	(Algeria) Adel Djerrar	CR Belouizdad	Free transfer	
24 June 2018	DF	(Algeria) Ali Guitoune	CA Bordj Bou Arreridj	Free transfer	
30 June 2018	MF	(Algeria) Ziri Hammar	USM Alger	Loan return	
9 August 2018	MF	(Guinea) Mohamed Thiam	CR Belouizdad	Free transfer	
11 November 2018	MF	(Algeria) Mehdi Benaldjia	MC Alger	Free transfer	
4 December 2018	MF	(Algeria) Salim Boukhenchouche	MO Béjaïa	Loan for six month	
