= 2021 Algerian League Cup final =

- Stade du 5 Juillet hosted the match
- Event: 2020–21 Algerian League Cup
NC Magra	JS Kabylie
2	2
- JS Kabylie won 4–1 on penalties
- Date: August 10, 2021
- Venue: Stade du 5 Juillet, Algiers
- Referee: Mustapha Ghorbal
- Attendance: 0 (Note: The match was played behind closed doors due to the COVID-19 pandemic in Algeria.)
- Weather: Sunny; 27 °C (81 °F); 78% humidity

The 2021 Algerian League Cup final was the 5th final of the Algerian League Cup. The final took place on August 10, 2021, at Stade du 5 Juillet in Algiers with kick-off at 19:00 between NC Magra and JS Kabylie. The match ended with JS Kabylie winning 4–1 on penalties, which is the first title in the club’s history in this competition and guarantees participation in the 2021–22 CAF Confederation Cup.

== Road to the final ==
NC Magra

Preliminary round	NC Magra	3–0	CS Constantine
Round of 16	CR Belouizdad	0–0; 2 – 4 (pen.)	NC Magra
Quarter-finals	NC Magra	2–1	JS Saoura
Semifinals	NC Magra	2–1 (a.e.t.)	USM Alger

JS Kabylie

Round of 16	JS Kabylie	2–0	NA Hussein Dey
Quarter-finals	US Biskra	0–2	JS Kabylie
Semifinals	JS Kabylie	1–0	WA Tlemcen

== Match ==
=== Pre-match ===
Twenty-two years after the last version of the Algerian League Cup that was played in the 1999–2000 season and because of the cancellation of the Algerian Cup, an exception only for this season due to COVID-19 pandemic in Algeria, the final played between JS Kabylie and NC Magra both of them have never reached the final before. JS Kabylie’s career was not difficult, and on the way to the final where they eliminated NA Hussein Dey, US Biskra and WA Tlemcen, unlike NC Magra who played against big clubs, CS Constantine, CR Belouizdad, JS Saoura, and finally USM Alger. the match led by international referee Mustapha Ghorbal and the match was expected to be broadcast on Télévision Algérienne, but due to the great fires that Algeria witnessed especially in the Kabylie region, it was decided not to broadcast the match neither on Télévision Algérienne nor on Radio Algeria, JS Kabylie decided to enter With black badges to mourn the victims who were in the dozens.

== Match details ==
10 August 2021
19:00

NC Magra	2–2 (a.e.t.)	JS Kabylie
Demane 11'; Korichi 93'		Boualia 37'; Haroun 120'
Penalties
Fegaâs (penalty missed); Korichi (penalty missed); Belhamri (penalty scored)	1–4	(penalty scored) Souyad; (penalty scored) Ghanem; (penalty scored) Benchaira; (penalty scored) Boualia

Stade du 5 Juillet, Algiers
Attendance: 0
Referee: Mustapha Ghorbal

GK	16	(Algeria) Zakaria Bouhalfaya
CB	5	(Algeria) Rachid Meghazi
CB	22	(Algeria) Mohamed Achref Aib
RB	2	(Algeria) Kheir Eddine Ali Haïmoud
LB	25	(Algeria) Salah Hmida
DM	24	(Algeria) Mohammed Essaid Bourahla	(yellow card) 86'
DM	13	(Algeria) Ayache Ziouache		(substituted off) 64'
AM	15	(Algeria) Aziz Fegaâs
ST	6	(Algeria) Hadj Bouguèche		(substituted off) 58'
LW	26	(Algeria) Abdesslem Bouchouareb	(yellow card) 22'	(substituted off) 88'
RW	7	(Algeria) Akram Demane (c)		(substituted off) 107'
Substitutes :
GK	12	(Algeria) Abdelmalek Necir
LB	61	(Algeria) ِAbdelhamid Driss
LB	27	(Algeria) Brahim Salah Eddine Bernou		(substituted in) 107'
DM	19	(Algeria) Walid Belhamri		(substituted in) 58'
LW	43	(Algeria) Mohamed Benkablia		(substituted in) 64'
LW	11	(Algeria) Nadhir Korichi		(substituted in) 88'
CF	10	(Algeria) Naoufel Righi
Manager :
(Algeria) Aziz Abbès

GK	25	(Algeria) Oussama Benbot
RB	31	(Algeria) Ahmed Mohamed Kerroum	(substituted off) 110'
CB	2	(Algeria) Ahmed Ait Abdessalem
CB	5	(Algeria) Badreddine Souyad
LB	22	(Algeria) Walid Bencherifa (c)	(substituted off) 110'
DM	13	(Algeria) Aziz Benabdi
DM	19	(Algeria) Malik Raiah	(substituted off) 83'
AM	7	(Algeria) Mohamed Benchaira
RW	14	(Libya) Mohamed Tubal Abdussalam	(substituted off) 80'
ST	48	(Algeria) Kouceila Boualia
LW	17	(Algeria) Rédha Bensayah	(substituted off) 80'
Substitutes :
GK	30	(Algeria) Abdelatif Ramdhane
LB	3	(Algeria) Abdelmoumen Chikhi	(substituted in) 110'
CB	4	(Algeria) Bilal Tizi Bouali
LW	8	(Algeria) Juba Oukaci	(substituted in) 80'
ST	12	(Algeria) Ali Haroun	(substituted in) 83'
LW	20	(Algeria) Fouad Ghanem	(substituted in) 80'
FW	15	(Algeria) Massinissa Nezla	(substituted in) 110'
Manager :
(France) Denis Lavagne

MATCH OFFICIALS

- Assistant referees:
  - Mohamed Serradj
  - Brahim El Hamlaoui
- Fourth official:
  - Abdelmoumen Touabti

Match rules

- 90 minutes.
- Penalty shoot-out if scores level.
- Seven named substitutes, of which up to five may be used.
