= 2021–22 RC Relizane season =

RC Relizane
2021–22 season
- President: Lyamine Bougherara (until 10 January 2022)
- Stadium: Tahar Zoughari Stadium
- Ligue 1: 17th (relegated)
- Top goalscorer: League: Abou Sofiane Balegh (13 goals); All: Abou Sofiane Balegh (13 goals)
- Biggest win: 3–5 vs NA Hussein Dey (A) (21 May 2022); Ligue 1
- Biggest defeat: 0–8 vs CR Belouizdad (H) (27 May 2022); Ligue 1

In the 2021–22 season, RC Relizane was competing in the Ligue 1 for the ninth season, as well as the Algerian Cup. It was their second consecutive season in the top flight of Algerian football. They were competing in Ligue 1, and the Algerian Cup.

== Squad list ==
Players and squad numbers last updated on 20 October 2021.
Note: Flags indicate national team as has been defined under FIFA eligibility rules. Players may hold more than one non-FIFA nationality.

No.	Nat.	Position	Name	Date of birth (age)	Signed from
Goalkeepers
1	(Algeria)	GK	Mustapha Zaidi	20 May 1985 (aged 36)	(Algeria) Olympique de Médéa
12	(Algeria)	GK	Omar Hamou	20 May 1999 (aged 22)	(Algeria) Youth system
16	(Algeria)	GK	Hamza Bousseder	17 February 1991 (aged 30)	(Algeria) US Biskra
Defenders
2	(Algeria)	RB	Rabah Aich	18 July 1992 (aged 29)	(Algeria) CR Belouizdad
3	(Algeria)	RB	Mohamed El Amine Barka	20 March 1993 (aged 28)	(Algeria) USM Bel Abbès
4	(Algeria)	CB	Bouabdellah Chadouli	22 March 1998 (aged 23)	(Algeria) Youth system
5	(Algeria)	CB	Arslane Mazari	6 January 1989 (aged 32)	(Algeria) MO Béjaïa
13	(Algeria)	LB	Nasreddine Benlebna	9 May 1995 (aged 26)	(Algeria) ES Sétif
20	(Algeria)	CB	Abbes Noureddine Haddou	11 July 1999 (aged 22)	(Algeria) USM Bel Abbès
22	(Algeria)	RB	Abderrahim Abdelli	9 August 1996 (aged 25)	(Algeria) USM Bel Abbès
23	(Algeria)	CB	Rabah Mokrani	6 March 1996 (aged 25)	(Algeria) MC Alger
25	(Algeria)	LB	Seifeddine Chettih	28 May 1991 (aged 30)	(Algeria) Olympique de Médéa
26	(Algeria)	RB	Billel Bouzid	18 December 1996 (aged 25)	(Algeria) Youth system
Midfielders
6	(Algeria)	MF	Ibrahim Si Ammar	29 November 1987 (aged 34)	(Algeria) AS Ain M'lila
7	(Algeria)	MF	Mehdi Kadri	14 March 1995 (aged 26)	(Algeria) MO Béjaïa
8	(Algeria)	MF	Walid Hellal	1 August 1994 (aged 27)	(Algeria) ASO Chlef
10	(Algeria)	MF	Sabri Gharbi	26 May 1987 (aged 34)	(Algeria) USM Bel Abbès
15	(Algeria)	MF	Noufel Ould Hamou	16 February 1999 (aged 22)	(Algeria) CR Belouizdad
21	(Algeria)	MF	Hichem Abdelli	9 March 1998 (aged 23)	(Algeria) RCB Oued Rhiou
24	(Algeria)	MF	Younes Koulkheir	1 June 1996 (aged 25)	(Algeria) USM Bel Abbès
Forwards
11	(Algeria)	FW	Mounir Aichi	7 March 1992 (aged 29)	(Algeria) WA Tlemcen
14	(Algeria)	FW	Youcef Chibane	23 September 1988 (aged 33)	(Algeria) US Biskra
17	(Algeria)	FW	Abou Sofiane Balegh	17 August 1988 (aged 33)	(Algeria) CS Constantine
18	(Algeria)	FW	Saddam Hussein Baleh	12 February 1991 (aged 30)	(Algeria) USM Annaba
19	(Algeria)	FW	Abdelillah Barkat	8 August 1996 (aged 25)	(Algeria) IS Tighennif

== Competitions ==
=== Overview ===
Competition	Record								Started round	Final position / round	First match	Last match
Competition	G	W	D	L	GF	GA	GD	Win %	Started round	Final position / round	First match	Last match
Ligue 1	34	4	8	22	31	87	−56	11.76	—N/a	17th	29 October 2021	10 June 2022
Total	34	4	8	22	31	87	−56	11.76				

Updated to match played 10 June 2022
Source: Competitions

== League table ==
Pos	Team	Pld	W	D	L	GF	GA	GD	Pts	Qualification or relegation
14	RC Arbaâ	34	10	13	11	40	45	−5	43	
15	Olympique de Médéa (R)	34	10	6	18	32	53	−21	36	Relegation to Algerian Ligue 2
16	NA Hussein Dey (R)	34	5	7	22	33	66	−33	22	Relegation to Algerian Ligue 2
17	RC Relizane (R)	34	4	8	22	31	87	−56	20	Relegation to Algerian Ligue 2
18	WA Tlemcen (R)	34	3	4	27	13	72	−59	13	Relegation to Algerian Ligue 2

Updated to match(es) played on 17 June 2022. Source: the-sports.org
Rules for classification: 1) points; 2) head-to-head points; 3) head-to-head goal difference; 4) goal difference; 5) total goals; 6) fairplay ranking; 7) playoff.
(R) Relegated

=== Results summary ===
Overall								Home						Away					
Pld	W	D	L	GF	GA	GD	Pts	W	D	L	GF	GA	GD	W	D	L	GF	GA	GD
34	4	8	22	31	87	−56	20	3	5	9	19	36	−17	1	3	13	12	51	−39

Last updated: 10 June 2022.
Source: Competitive matches

=== Results by round ===
Round	1	2	3	4	5	6	7	8	9	10	11	12	13	14	15	16	17	18	19	20	21	22	23	24	25	26	27	28	29	30	31	32	33	34
Ground	A	H	A	H	A	H	A	H	A	H	A	H	A	H	A	A	H	H	A	H	A	H	A	H	A	H	A	H	A	H	A	H	H	A
Result	L	W	L	D	L	D	D	L	L	W	L	L	D	W	L	L	L	L	D	D	L	D	L	L	L	L	L	L	L	L	W	L	D	L
Position	18	11	14	13	13	13	12	15	16	12	14	17	17	14	17	17	17	17	17	17	17	17	17	17	17	17	17	17	17	17	17	17	17	17

Updated to match(es) played on 17 June 2022. Source: Competitive matches
A = Away; H = Home; W = Win; D = Draw; L = Loss

=== Matches ===
The league fixtures were announced on 7 October 2021.

2 November 2021 Round 1	JS Saoura	6–0	RC Relizane	Béchar
15:00	Hamidi 3', 67', 74' (pen.); Ouis 42'; Boubekeur 61'; Hammia 90'	Report		Stadium: 20 August 1955 Stadium; Referee: Lyés Bekouassa

29 October 2021 Round 2	RC Relizane	2–1	WA Tlemcen	Relizane
15:00	Belalia 15'; Hellal 49'	Report	Keniche 24'	Stadium: Tahar Zoughari Stadium; Referee: Hamza Boucetta

7 November 2021 Round 3	US Biskra	1–0	RC Relizane	Biskra
15:00	Mokhtar 27' (pen.)	Report		Stadium: 18 February Stadium; Referee: Bilel Soltani

20 November 2021 Round 4	RC Relizane	0–0	MC Alger	Relizane
15:00		Report		Stadium: Tahar Zoughari Stadium; Referee: Abdelali Ibrir

25 November 2021 Round 5	USM Alger	3–1	RC Relizane	Bologhine
18:00	Belkacemi 22'; Benhammouda 37', 58'	Report	Balegh 83'	Stadium: Omar Hamadi Stadium; Attendance: 0 (close doors); Referee: Abderrezzak Arab

3 December 2021 Round 6	RC Relizane	1–1	CS Constantine	Relizane
15:00	Meguenine 54'	Report	Debbih 33'	Stadium: Tahar Zoughari Stadium; Referee: Malek Ait Ameur

11 December 2021 Round 7	HB Chelghoum Laïd	1–1	RC Relizane	Chelghoum Laïd
14:30	Benamrane 2'		Baleh 11'	Stadium: 11 December 1961 Stadium; Referee: Hamza Bouslimani

24 December 2021 Round 9	JS Kabylie	3–0	RC Relizane	Tizi Ouzou
17:00	Nezla 54', 60'; Bensayah 57'	Report		Stadium: 1 November 1954 Stadium; Attendance: 0 (close doors); Referee: Abdelmoumen Touabti

28 December 2021 Round 10	RC Relizane	2–1	Olympique de Médéa	Relizane
14:30	Balegh 21' (pen.), 50'	Report	Baâli 60'	Stadium: Tahar Zoughari Stadium; Referee: Said Aouina

2 January 2022 Round 11	ASO Chlef	1–0	RC Relizane	Chlef
15:00	Dahmani 61'	Report		Stadium: Mohamed Boumezrag Stadium; Referee: Hamza Boucetta

8 January 2022 Round 12	RC Relizane	0–1	ES Sétif	Relizane
14:30	Bousseder (yellow card) 90+4'	Report	Ali Larbi (yellow card) 24'; Farhi 36'	Stadium: Tahar Zoughari Stadium; Referee: Mohamed Amine Benzohra

14 January 2022 Round 13	MC Oran	1–1	RC Relizane	Oran
17:00	Yacine Guenina 23'	Report	Abou Sofiane Balegh 33'	Stadium: Ahmed Zabana Stadium; Referee: Houssam Benyahia

21 January 2022 Round 14	RC Relizane	2–1	NA Hussein Dey	Relizane
14:00	Si Ammar 35'; Balegh 90+4'	Report	Hamdaoui 12'	Stadium: Tahar Zoughari Stadium; Referee: Abderrezzak Arab

25 January 2022 Round 15	CR Belouizdad	2–0	RC Relizane	Belouizdad
15:00	Dadache 88' (pen.); Khalfallah 90'	Report		Stadium: 20 August 1955 Stadium; Attendance: 0 (close doors); Referee: Akram Mechairia

29 January 2022 Round 16	RC Arbaâ	2–1	RC Relizane	Larbaâ
14:30	Saidani 45+5'; Oukil 66'	Report	Belalia 88'	Stadium: Ismaïl Makhlouf Stadium; Referee: Amine Hansal

5 February 2022 Round 17	RC Relizane	1–2	NC Magra	Relizane
15:00	Barka 82'	Report	Hitala (45-2); Demane 90+1'	Stadium: Tahar Zoughari Stadium; Referee: Hamza Bouslimani

9 February 2022 Round 8	RC Relizane	0–2	Paradou AC	Relizane
15:00		Report	Zerrouki 21', 37'	Stadium: Tahar Zoughari Stadium; Referee: Mohamed Tahar Milia

1 March 2022 Round 19	WA Tlemcen	0–0	RC Relizane	Tlemcen
14:30		Report		Stadium: Colonel Lotfi Stadium; Referee: Bilel Soltani

5 March 2022 Round 20	RC Relizane	1–1	US Biskra	Relizane
14:30	Si Ammar 33'	Report	Lakhdari 15'	Stadium: Tahar Zoughari Stadium; Referee: Mohamed Benzahra

9 March 2022 Round 18	RC Relizane	1–2	JS Saoura	Relizane
14:30	Balegh 18' (pen.)	Report	Saâdi 76'; Lahmeri 87' (pen.)	Stadium: Tahar Zoughari Stadium; Referee: Amine Hansal

13 March 2022 Round 21	MC Alger	8–2	RC Relizane	Algiers
14:00	Frioui 10', 32', 45', 53', 83'; Esso 17'; Zaidi 87'; Benguit 89'	Report	Chibane 45+1'; Balegh 81' (pen.)	Stadium: Omar Hamadi Stadium; Attendance: 0 (close doors); Referee: Mohamad Salah Dafri

18 March 2022 Round 22	RC Relizane	0–0	USM Alger	Relizane
15:00	Mazari (yellow card) 50'	Report	Benzaza (yellow card) 21' (yellow-red card) 69'	Stadium: Tahar Zoughari Stadium; Referee: Abdelmoumen Touabti

26 March 2022 Round 23	CS Constantine	4–0	RC Relizane	Constantine
15:00	Belahouel 34'; Lakdja 47'; Dib 56'; Hamzaoui 86'	Report		Stadium: Ramadane Ben Abdelmalek Stadium; Referee: Hamza Boucetta

31 March 2022 Round 24	RC Relizane	1–2	HB Chelghoum Laïd	Relizane
15:00	Si Ammar 36'	Report	Aïb 69'; Harrari 75'	Stadium: Tahar Zoughari Stadium; Referee: Hamza Bouslimani

12 April 2022 Round 25	Paradou AC	3–0	RC Relizane	Bologhine
22:00	Benbouali 34', 70'; Bouzok 74'	Report		Stadium: Omar Hamadi Stadium; Referee: Hadj Aissa Semache

17 April 2022 Round 26	RC Relizane	1–4	JS Kabylie	Relizane
16:45	Belalia 78'	Report	Bensayah 27' (pen.), 56'; Oukaci 37' (pen.); Ouattara 61'	Stadium: Tahar Zoughari Stadium; Referee: Nadjib Meziani

22 April 2022 Round 27	Olympique de Médéa	2–0	RC Relizane	Médéa
15:45	Baâli 44'; Gagaa 87'	Report		Stadium: Imam Lyes Stadium; Referee: Riadh Ammar Khodja

29 April 2022 Round 28	RC Relizane	4–5	ASO Chlef	Relizane
16:45	Balegh 11' (pen.), 90' (pen.); Ould Hamou 38'; Belalia 87'	Report	Alili 15' (pen.); Zahzouh 42', 90+5'; Aliane 45+1'; Fourloul 83'	Stadium: Tahar Zoughari Stadium; Referee: Mokrane Batouche

10 May 2022 Round 29	ES Sétif	7–0	RC Relizane	Sétif
20:00	Djahnit 27' (pen.); Debbari 33'; Bakrar 36'; Motrani 61'; Benayad 71', 81'; Deghmoum 72'	Report		Stadium: 8 May 1945 Stadium; Referee: Mohamed Tahar Milia

14 May 2022 Round 30	RC Relizane	0–2	MC Oran	Relizane
17:00	Guenina 15' (pen.), 16'	Report		Stadium: Tahar Zoughari Stadium; Referee: Fodil Oukil

21 May 2022 Round 31	NA Hussein Dey	3–5	RC Relizane	Belouizdad
16:00	Benayad 38', 45+1'; Bekkouche 43'	Report	Balegh 10', 34', 82', 90'; Gharbi 69'	Stadium: 20 August 1955 Stadium; Attendance: 0 (close doors); Referee: Ahmed Daas

27 May 2022 Round 32	RC Relizane	0–8	CR Belouizdad	Relizane
17:45		Report	Bousseliou 6', 30'; Merzougui 12', 40'; Bourdim 53'; Bouchar 55'; Belkhiter 79', 84'	Stadium: Tahar Zoughari Stadium; Referee: Zine El Abidine Dekhane

3 June 2022 Round 33	RC Relizane	3–3	RC Arbaâ	Relizane
16:45	Harrats 8'; Belalia 64', 82'	Report	Boubakour 24', 52'; Deghmani 45+3'	Stadium: Tahar Zoughari Stadium; Referee: Mohamed Salah Dafri

10 June 2022 Round 34	NC Magra	4–1	RC Relizane	Magra
16:45	Hitala 3' (pen.), 17', 28'; Demane 90+3'	Report	Belalia 88'	Stadium: Boucheligue Brothers Stadium; Referee: Marouane Mohamed Belkebir

== Squad information ==
=== Playing statistics ===
No.	Pos	Nat	Player	Total		Ligue 1	
No.	Pos	Nat	Player	Apps	Goals	Apps	Goals
Goalkeepers
1	GK	(Algeria) ALG	Mustapha Zaidi	1	0	1	0
12	GK	(Algeria) ALG	Omar Hamou	19	0	19	0
16	GK	(Algeria) ALG	Hamza Bousseder	14	0	14	0
	GK	(Algeria) ALG	Benaouda Benmokhtar	4	0	4	0
	GK	(Algeria) ALG	Hadj Abdelkader Barkat	1	0	1	0
	GK	(Algeria) ALG	Abderrahmane Ouadah	1	0	1	0
Defenders
2	DF	(Algeria) ALG	Rabah Aich	14	0	14	0
3	DF	(Algeria) ALG	Mohamed El Amine Barka	19	1	19	1
4	DF	(Algeria) ALG	Bouabdellah Chadouli	13	0	13	0
5	DF	(Algeria) ALG	Arslane Mazari	9	0	9	0
13	DF	(Algeria) ALG	Nasreddine Benlebna	10	0	10	0
20	DF	(Algeria) ALG	Abbes Noureddine Haddou	0	0	0	0
22	DF	(Algeria) ALG	Abderrahim Abdelli	14	0	14	0
23	DF	(Algeria) ALG	Rabah Mokrani	12	0	12	0
39	DF	(Algeria) ALG	Abdelkader Meguenine	26	1	26	1
	DF	(Algeria) ALG	Aymen Chikhaoui	2	0	2	0
	DF	(Algeria) ALG	Khaled Kaddous	7	0	7	0
	DF	(Algeria) ALG	Mohamed Maatallah	3	0	3	0
	DF	(Algeria) ALG	El Hadj Mhamed Aichouch	2	0	2	0
Midfielders
6	MF	(Algeria) ALG	Ibrahim Si Ammar	20	3	20	3
7	MF	(Algeria) ALG	Mehdi Kadri	13	0	13	0
8	MF	(Algeria) ALG	Walid Hellal	11	1	11	1
10	MF	(Algeria) ALG	Sabri Gharbi	11	1	11	1
15	MF	(Algeria) ALG	Noufel Ould Hamou	21	1	21	1
21	MF	(Algeria) ALG	Hichem Abdelli	0	0	0	0
24	MF	(Algeria) ALG	Younes Koulkheir	23	0	23	0
	MF	(Algeria) ALG	Mohamed Benkadour	6	0	6	0
	MF	(Algeria) ALG	Mohamed Belaroussi	7	0	7	0
	MF	(Algeria) ALG	Noureddine Benabdelmoumene	1	0	1	0
	MF	(Algeria) ALG	Younes Mesbah	11	0	11	0
	MF	(Algeria) ALG	Djamel Eddine Boukhors	1	0	1	0
	MF	(Algeria) ALG	Mohamed Aouissi	4	0	4	0
	MF	(Algeria) ALG	Djamel Eddine Kheirat	1	0	1	0
	MF	(Algeria) ALG	Taha Yassine Tahar	32	0	32	0
Forwards
11	FW	(Algeria) ALG	Mounir Aichi	12	0	12	0
14	FW	(Algeria) ALG	Youcef Chibane	23	1	23	1
17	FW	(Algeria) ALG	Abou Sofiane Balegh	24	13	24	13
18	FW	(Algeria) ALG	Saddam Hussein Baleh	15	1	15	1
19	FW	(Algeria) ALG	Abdelillah Barkat	18	0	18	0
49	FW	(Algeria) ALG	Ahmed Belalia	26	7	26	7
59	FW	(Algeria) ALG	Mhamed Harrats	14	1	14	1
	FW	(Algeria) ALG	Mohamed Aymen Ouadah	2	0	2	0
	FW	(Algeria) ALG	Ibrahim Zergaoui	4	0	4	0
	FW	(Algeria) ALG	Khaled Osamnia	1	0	1	0
Players transferred out during the season
25	DF	(Algeria) ALG	Seifeddine Chettih	11	0	11	0
26	DF	(Algeria) ALG	Billel Bouzid	6	0	6	0

Last updated: 10 June 2022
Source: soccerway.com

=== Goalscorers ===
As of 10 June 2022

Includes all competitive matches. The list is sorted alphabetically by surname when total goals are equal.

No.	Nat.	Player	Pos.	L 1	TOTAL
17	(Algeria)	Abou Sofiane Balegh	FW	13	13
49	(Algeria)	Ahmed Belalia	FW	7	7
6	(Algeria)	Ibrahim Si Ammar	MF	3	3
18	(Algeria)	Saddam Hussein Baleh	FW	1	1
59	(Algeria)	Mhamed Harrats	FW	1	1
14	(Algeria)	Youcef Chibane	FW	1	1
8	(Algeria)	Walid Hellal	MF	1	1
10	(Algeria)	Sabri Gharbi	MF	1	1
15	(Algeria)	Noufel Ould Hamou	MF	1	1
3	(Algeria)	Mohamed El Amine Barka	DF	1	1
39	(Algeria)	Abdelkader Meguenine	DF	1	1
Own Goals				0	0
Totals				31	31

== Transfers ==
=== In ===
Date	Pos	Player	From club	Transfer fee	Source
5 October 2021	FW	(Algeria) Saddam Hussein Baleh	USM Annaba	Free transfer	
6 October 2021	RB	(Algeria) Abderrahim Abdelli	USM Bel Abbès	Free transfer	
7 October 2021	FW	(Algeria) Mounir Aichi	WA Tlemcen	Free transfer	
7 October 2021	LB	(Algeria) Nasreddine Benlebna	ES Sétif	Free transfer	
7 October 2021	MF	(Algeria) Laid Ouaji	JS Kabylie	Free transfer	
17 October 2021	FW	(Algeria) Youcef Chibane	US Biskra	Free transfer	
18 October 2021	MF	(Algeria) Hichem Abdelli	RCB Oued Rhiou	Free transfer	
19 October 2021	MF	(Algeria) Abbes Noureddine Haddou	USM Bel Abbès	Free transfer	
20 October 2021	MF	(Algeria) Ibrahim Si Ammar	NA Hussein Dey	Free transfer	

=== Out ===
Date	Pos	Player	To club	Transfer fee	Source
21 September 2021	MF	(Algeria) Younes Koulkheir	MC Oran	Free transfer	
22 September 2021	MF	(Algeria) Mohamed Reda Nekrouf	(Tunisia) CS Chebba	Free transfer	
21 September 2021	MF	(Algeria) Aymen Chadli	MC Oran	Free transfer	
23 September 2021	FW	(Algeria) Houcine Aoued	Paradou AC	Free Transfer	
7 October 2021	MF	(Algeria) Abdelmalek Elmenaouer	HB Chelghoum Laïd	Free transfer	
10 October 2021	ST	(Algeria) Ramdane Hitala	NC Magra	Free transfer	
14 October 2021	FW	(Algeria) Mohamed Seguer	WA Tlemcen	Free transfer	
