= 2024–25 Olympique Akbou season =

Olympique Akbou
2024–25 season
- Owner: Soummam
- President: Karim Takka
- Head coach: Moez Bouakaz (from 29 July 2024) (until 30 November 2024); Mounir Zeghdoud (from 3 December 2024) (until 5 January 2025); Denis Lavagne (from 10 January 2025) (until 27 March 2025); Yacine Ouzani (from 27 March 2025)
- Stadium: Maghrebi Unity Stadium
- Ligue 1: 11th
- Algerian Cup: Round of 16
- Top goalscorer: League: Ali Haroun (5 goals); All: Ali Haroun (5 goals)
Home colours	Away colours

The 2024–25 season, is Olympique Akbou's first time in the top flight of Algerian football. In addition to the domestic league, Olympique Akbou are participating in the Algerian Cup. On June 27, 2024, The federal office approved the calendar for the 2024–25 Ligue 1 season with the aim of ending on May 31, 2025. The first round is scheduled for September 14, this delay is motivated both by an extended end of the 2023–24 season but also by the holding of early presidential elections which will take place on September 7, 2024. However, the Ligue de Football Professionnel decided to postpone the start of the Ligue 1 by a week, on September 21. On September 9, 2024, Olympique Akbou has just benefited from a new sponsor, the National Electricity and Gas Distribution Company (Sonelgaz), which will be the other sponsor for the 2024–25 season. The leaders of Olympique Akbou intend to mobilize all necessary means to succeed in meeting expectations and ensure that they find the right dynamics to achieve the set objective, especially since a difficult task is expected, particularly with tough competition in the Algerian football elite championship.

== Squad list ==
Players and squad numbers last updated on 5 February 2025.
Note: Flags indicate national team as has been defined under FIFA eligibility rules. Players may hold more than one non-FIFA nationality.

No.	Nat.	Position	Name	Date of birth (age)	Signed from
Goalkeepers
15	(Algeria)	Hatem Bencheikh El Fegoun	GK	3 November 1999 (aged 24)	(Algeria) CA Batna
16	(Algeria)	Benaouda Klileche	GK	20 November 1999 (aged 24)	(Algeria) Unknown
Defenders
2	(Algeria)	Abdeldjalil Bahoussi	CB	5 August 1993 (aged 31)	(Algeria) MC El Bayadh
3	(Algeria)	Mohammed Bouhalfaya	LB	13 November 2004 (aged 19)	(Algeria) E Sour El Ghozlane
4	(Algeria)	Adel Ghanem	DM	20 January 2003 (aged 22)	(Algeria) MC Alger
5	(Algeria)	Slimane Bouteldja	RB	30 March 1995 (aged 29)	(Algeria) AS Khroub
14	(Algeria)	Tarek Adouane	CB	25 February 1997 (aged 27)	(Algeria) US Biskra
17	(Algeria)	Billal Boukaroum	RB	19 December 1993 (aged 30)	(Algeria) US Biskra
21	(Algeria)	Younes Ouassa	LB	4 July 1999 (aged 25)	(Algeria) E Sour El Ghozlane
24	(Algeria)	Yasser Chelfaoui	LB	14 December 1996 (aged 27)	(Algeria) MCB Oued Sly
Midfielders
6	(Algeria)	Louanes Zidi	DM	19 September 2001 (aged 22)	(Algeria) Reserve team
8	(Algeria)	Dhirar Bensaadallah	DM	4 March 2000 (aged 24)	(Jordan) Ma'an SC
13	(Algeria)	Sid Ali Lamri	CM	3 February 1991 (aged 33)	(Algeria) USM Khenchela
18	(Algeria)	Hicham Messiad	AM	21 April 1999 (aged 25)	(Algeria) Paradou AC
20	(Algeria)	Toufik Addadi	CM	7 October 1990 (aged 33)	(Algeria) ES Mostaganem
22	(Algeria)	Massinissa Benamara	AM	3 July 2002 (aged 22)	(Algeria) Reserve team
23	(Algeria)	Merouane Mehdaoui	CM	10 January 1998 (aged 26)	(Algeria) E Sour El Ghozlane
Forwards
7	(Algeria)	Abdelhak Askar	LW	15 December 1997 (aged 26)	(Libya) Al-Bashayir SC
9	(Algeria)	Mohamed Gherbi	ST	10 June 2004 (aged 20)	(Algeria) Reserve team
10	(Algeria)	Sofiane Lachahab	RW	12 July 1999 (aged 25)	(Algeria) CA Bordj Bou Arreridj
11	(Algeria)	Lounes Adjout	ST	1 January 2002 (aged 22)	(Algeria) JS Kabylie
12	(Algeria)	Ali Haroun	ST	1 February 1997 (aged 27)	(Algeria) ES Ben Aknoun
19	(Algeria)	Mohamed Hamadouche	LW	23 April 2004 (aged 20)	(Algeria) USM Bel Abbès
26	(Algeria)	Walid Zamoum	LW	10 June 1997 (aged 27)	(Algeria) ES Sétif
27	(Algeria)	Omar Adrar	ST	25 July 1999 (aged 25)	(Algeria) SKAF Khemis Miliana

== Transfers ==
=== In ===
==== Summer ====
Date	Pos	Player	Moving from	Fee	Source
23 July 2024	GK	(Algeria) Hatem Bencheikh El Fegoun	CA Batna	Free transfer	
23 July 2024	LW	(Algeria) Abdelhak Askar	(Libya) Al-Bashayir SC	Free transfer	
24 July 2024	GK	(Algeria) Mohamed El Amine Yacoubi	MC Alger U21	Free transfer	
24 July 2024	DM	(Algeria) Dhirar Bensaadallah	(Jordan) Ma'an SC	Free transfer	
24 July 2024	CM	(Algeria) Sid Ali Lamri	USM Khenchela	Free transfer	
25 July 2024	AM	(Algeria) Hicham Messiad	Paradou AC	Free transfer	
25 July 2024	FW	(Algeria) Walid Zamoum	ES Sétif	Free transfer	
25 July 2024	MF	(Algeria) Mohamed El Hachemi Chacha	US Souf	Free transfer	
26 July 2024	RW	(Algeria) Ammar Oukil	MC Alger	Free transfer	
26 July 2024	CB	(Algeria) Abdeldjalil Bahoussi	MC El Bayadh	Free transfer	
27 July 2024	CB	(Algeria) Tarek Adouane	US Biskra	Free transfer	
27 July 2024	MF	(Algeria) Juba Oukaci	MC Oran	Free transfer	
29 July 2024	FW	(Algeria) Mohamed Hamadouche	USM Bel Abbès	Free transfer	
29 July 2024	FW	(Algeria) Ali Haroun	ES Ben Aknoun	Free transfer	
29 July 2024	RB	(Algeria) Bilal Boukarroum	US Biskra	Free transfer	
29 July 2024	MF	(Algeria) Rayane Ait Mouloud	Reserve team	First Professional Contract	

==== Winter ====
Date	Pos	Player	Moving from	Fee	Source
2 January 2025	CM	(Algeria) Toufik Addadi	(Algeria) ES Mostaganem	Free transfer	
5 February 2025	FW	(Algeria) Lounes Adjout	(Algeria) JS Kabylie	Free transfer	

=== Out ===
==== Summer ====
Date	Pos	Player	Moving to	Fee	Source
24 July 2024	FW	(Algeria) Hamek Abbes	JS Saoura	Free transfer	

==== Winter ====
Date	Pos	Player	Moving to	Fee	Source
5 January 2025	CB	(Algeria) Zidane Mebarakou	Unattached	Free transfer (Released)	
5 January 2025	CM	(Algeria) Juba Oukaci	Unattached	Free transfer (Released)	

=== New contracts ===
No.	Pos	Player	Contract length	Contract end	Date	Source
	LB	Mohamed Yasser Chelfaoui	2 years	2027	23 July 2024	
	ST	Mohamed Amine Gharbi	4 years	2028	24 July 2024	
	RB	Slimane Bouteldja	2 years	2027	24 July 2024	
	CB	Zidane Mebarakou	2 years	2026	26 July 2024	
	CM	Merouane Mehdaoui	3 years	2027	26 July 2024	
	RW	Sofiane Fouad Lachahab	2 years	2026	27 July 2024	
	GK	Benaouda Klileche	2 years	2026	29 July 2024	
	LB	Younes Abdelhak Ouassa	2 years	2026	30 July 2024	

== Pre-season and friendlies ==
17 August 2024 Friendly	Olympique Akbou	1–0	JS El Biar	Akbou
17:00 UTC+1				Stadium: OPOD Guendouza Stadium

27 August 2024 Friendly	Olympique Akbou	1–2	USM Alger	Tabarka, Tunisia
17:30 UTC+1	Adrar	Report	Guenaoui 80' (pen.); Gassama 90+5' (pen.)	Stadium: La Cigale Sports Complex

29 August 2024 Friendly	Olympique Akbou	0–1	ES Mostaganem	Tabarka
17:30 UTC+1			Siam 43'	Stadium: La Cigale Sports Complex

2 September 2024 Friendly	Olympique Akbou	3–0	US Biskra	Tabarka
17:30 UTC+1	Ait Mouloud; Mebarakou; Dehamni			Stadium: La Cigale Sports Complex

5 September 2024 Friendly	Olympique Akbou	1–0	USM Khenchela	Tabarka
17:30 UTC+1	Oukaci			Stadium: La Cigale Sports Complex

6 September 2024 Friendly	Olympique Akbou	1–4	CR Belouizdad	Tabarka
16:30 UTC+1	Mahdaoui		Mahious; Boussouf; Meziane	Stadium: La Cigale Sports Complex

13 September 2024 Friendly	Olympique Akbou	1–0	JS Azazga	Béjaïa
10:00 UTC+1	Lachahab 50'			Stadium: Maghrebi Unity Stadium

13 September 2024 Friendly	Olympique Akbou	5–0	JSM Béjaïa	Béjaïa
17:00 UTC+1	Adrar; Zamoum; Messiad; Askar			Stadium: Maghrebi Unity Stadium

== Competitions ==
=== Overview ===
Competition	Record								Started round	Final position / round	First match	Last match
Competition	G	W	D	L	GF	GA	GD	Win %	Started round	Final position / round	First match	Last match
Ligue 1	30	9	10	11	24	23	+1	30.00	—N/a	11th	20 September 2024	21 June 2025
Algerian Cup	3	2	1	0	2	0	+2	66.67	Round of 64	Round of 16	5 February 2025	11 March 2025
Total	33	11	11	11	26	23	+3	33.33				

Updated to match played 21 June 2025
Source: Competitions

=== Ligue 1 ===
==== League table ====
Pos	Team	Pld	W	D	L	GF	GA	GD	Pts
9	USM Khenchela	30	11	7	12	28	38	−10	40
10	CS Constantine	30	9	12	9	31	31	0	39
11	Olympique Akbou	30	9	10	11	24	23	+1	37
12	MC El Bayadh	30	9	9	12	23	26	−3	36
13	ASO Chlef	30	7	13	10	24	27	−3	34

Source: the-sports.org
Rules for classification: 1) points; 2) head-to-head points; 3) head-to-head goal difference; 4) goal difference; 5) total goals; 6) fairplay ranking; 7) playoff.

==== Results summary ====
Overall								Home						Away					
Pld	W	D	L	GF	GA	GD	Pts	W	D	L	GF	GA	GD	W	D	L	GF	GA	GD
30	9	10	11	24	23	+1	37	6	5	4	13	9	+4	3	5	7	11	14	−3

Last updated: 21 June 2025.
Source: Competitive matches

==== Results by round ====
Round	1	2	3	4	5	6	7	8	9	10	11	12	13	14	15	16	17	18	19	20	21	22	23	24	25	26	27	28	29	30
Ground	H	A	H	A	H	A	H	A	H	H	A	H	A	H	A	A	H	A	H	A	H	A	H	A	A	H	A	H	A	H
Result	W	L	W	W	D	D	L	L	W	L	L	D	W	L	L	D	D	L	L	D	W	D	D	L	L	W	D	W	W	D
Position	5	8	3	2	3	4	6	6	4	8	10	10	7	8	10	11	12	12	13	12	11	11	11	12	14	12	13	12	11	11

Updated to match(es) played on 21 June 2025. Source: Competitive matches
A = Away; H = Home; W = Win; D = Draw; L = Loss

==== Matches ====
The league fixtures were announced on 11 July 2024.

All times are local, WAT (UTC+1).

Win Draw Loss Postponed

20 September 2024 Round 1	Olympique Akbou	1–0	NC Magra	Béjaïa
18:00	Askar 7'	Report		Stadium: Maghrebi Unity Stadium; Referee: Lotfi Bekouassa; VAR: Fateh Harkat

27 September 2024 Round 2	JS Kabylie	2–1	Olympique Akbou	Tizi Ouzou
17:45	Boualia 3'; Lahmeri 64'	Report	Haroun 40' (pen.)	Stadium: Hocine Aït Ahmed Stadium; Referee: Mustapha Ghorbal; VAR: Fateh Harkat

4 October 2024 Round 3	Olympique Akbou	2–1	JS Saoura	Béjaïa
16:00	Bouteldja 86'; Haroun 90+9'	Report	Belmiloud 45+1'	Stadium: Maghrebi Unity Stadium; Referee: Hamza Bouslimani

11 October 2024 Round 4	Paradou AC	1–3	Olympique Akbou	Algiers
16:00	Ramdaoui 31'	Report	Messiad 11'; Oukil 45'; Haroun 69' (pen.)	Stadium: 20 August 1955 Stadium; Referee: Nabil Boukhalfa

18 October 2024 Round 5	Olympique Akbou	0–0	ASO Chlef	Béjaïa
16:00		Report		Stadium: Maghrebi Unity Stadium; Referee: Tahar Boudjemaa; VAR: Anes Azrine

24 October 2024 Round 6	MC Alger	0–0	Olympique Akbou	Algiers
20:30		Report		Stadium: Stade du 5 Juillet; Referee: Mehdi Oukil; VAR: Mustapha Ghorbal

3 November 2024 Round 7	Olympique Akbou	1–2	ES Mostaganem	Béjaïa
17:30	Ouassa 59'	Report	Aoudjane 72', 86'	Stadium: Maghrebi Unity Stadium; Referee: Lotfi Bekouassa

8 November 2024 Round 8	CS Constantine	2–1	Olympique Akbou	Constantine
17:45	Omoyele 46'; Dib 76'	Report	Askar 88' (pen.)	Stadium: Chahid Hamlaoui Stadium; Referee: Rafik Aouina; VAR: Abderahmane Sahraoui

15 November 2024 Round 9	Olympique Akbou	3–1	MC Oran	Béjaïa
15:00	Haroun 81' (pen.); Bouteldja 90+6'; Adrar 90+9'	Report	Boussalem 83'	Stadium: Maghrebi Unity Stadium; Referee: Youcef Gamouh; VAR: Alaa Bouab

23 November 2024 Round 10	Olympique Akbou	0–1	ES Sétif	Béjaïa
15:00		Report	Bacha 48'	Stadium: Maghrebi Unity Stadium; Referee: Anes Azrine; VAR: Akram Mechairia

30 November 2024 Round 11	USM Khenchela	1–0	Olympique Akbou	Khenchela
15:00	Djaouchi 67'	Report		Stadium: Amar Hamam Stadium; Referee: Youcef Taieb Bouderbal

14 December 2024 Round 13	US Biskra	0–1	Olympique Akbou	Biskra
17:00		Report	Chelfaoui 53'	Stadium: 18 February Stadium; Referee: Rafik Aouina; VAR: Redouane Allou

21 December 2024 Round 14	Olympique Akbou	0–1	MC El Bayadh	Béjaïa
15:00		Report	Benchoucha 49'	Stadium: Maghrebi Unity Stadium; Referee: Abderahmane Sahraoui

27 December 2024 Round 15	CR Belouizdad	1–0	Olympique Akbou	Algiers
16:00	Meziane 78'	Report		Stadium: Stade du 5 Juillet; Attendance: 0 (close doors); Referee: Tahar Boudjemaa; VAR: Alaa Bouab

1 February 2025 Round 12	Olympique Akbou	0–0	USM Alger	Béjaïa
15:00		Report		Stadium: Maghrebi Unity Stadium; Referee: Fodil Oukil; VAR: Abderahmane Sahraoui

14 February 2025 Round 16	NC Magra	1–1	Olympique Akbou	Magra
15:00	Lakehal 22'	Report	Lachahab 90+9'	Stadium: Boucheligue Brothers Stadium; Referee: Abdelali Ibrir

19 February 2025 Round 17	Olympique Akbou	0–0	JS Kabylie	Béjaïa
15:30		Report		Stadium: Maghrebi Unity Stadium; Attendance: 0 (close doors); Referee: Youcef Taieb Bouderbal; VAR: Nabil Boukhalfa

27 February 2025 Round 18	JS Saoura	2–1	Olympique Akbou	Béchar
17:00	Akacem 58'; Zaâlani 79'	Report	Gherbi 24'	Stadium: 20 August 1955 Stadium; Referee: Mohamed Bouteraa

6 March 2025 Round 19	Olympique Akbou	1–2	Paradou AC	Béjaïa
22:00	Haroun 90+12'	Report	Tahar 70'; Boulbina 87'	Stadium: Maghrebi Unity Stadium; Referee: Ayoub Belhachemi

15 March 2025 Round 20	ASO Chlef	0–0	Olympique Akbou	Chlef
15:00		Report		Stadium: Mohamed Boumezrag Stadium; Referee: Fateh Harkat

10 April 2025 Round 22	ES Mostaganem	1–1	Olympique Akbou	Mostaganem
19:00	Hitala 51'	Report	Zamoum 34'	Stadium: Mohamed Bensaïd Stadium; Attendance: 0 (close doors); Referee: Youcef Gamouh; VAR: Fateh Harkat

15 April 2025 Round 21	Olympique Akbou	1–0	MC Alger	Béjaïa
16:30	Askar 79' (pen.)	Report		Stadium: Maghrebi Unity Stadium; Referee: Mustapha Ghorbal

25 April 2025 Round 24	MC Oran	1–0	Olympique Akbou	Oran
18:00	Dahar 54' (pen.)	Report		Stadium: Ahmed Zabana Stadium; Referee: Anes Azrine

11 May 2025 Round 25	ES Sétif	1–0	Olympique Akbou	Sétif
17:00	Boukerma 60'	Report		Stadium: 8 May 1945 Stadium; Referee: Haitham Ghouti; VAR: afik Aouina

16 May 2025 Round 26	Olympique Akbou	2–1	USM Khenchela	Béjaïa
16:30	Ouassa 24'; Addadi 75' (pen.)	Report	Djaouchi 88'	Stadium: Maghrebi Unity Stadium; Referee: Youcef Taieb Bouderbal; VAR: Abderahmane Sahraoui

26 May 2025 Round 27	USM Alger	1–1	Olympique Akbou	Algiers
20:00	Bimenyimana 90+2'	Report	Zamoum 86'	Stadium: Stade du 5 Juillet; Attendance: 0 (close doors); Referee: Youcef Gamouh; VAR: Yahia Dehar

30 May 2025 Round 23	Olympique Akbou	0–0	CS Constantine	Béjaïa
17:00		Report		Stadium: Maghrebi Unity Stadium; Referee: Rafik Aouina; VAR: Hamza Bouzit

11 June 2025 Round 28	Olympique Akbou	2–0	US Biskra	Béjaïa
17:00	Adouane 31'; Boukarroum 45+3' (pen.)	Report		Stadium: Maghrebi Unity Stadium; Referee: Houssam Benyahia; VAR: Ghada Mehat

17 June 2025 Round 29	MC El Bayadh	0–1	Olympique Akbou	El Bayadh
17:30		Report	Gherbi 38'	Stadium: Zakaria Medjdoub Stadium; Referee: Abdelali Ibrir

21 June 2025 Round 30	Olympique Akbou	0–0	CR Belouizdad	Béjaïa
17:45		Report		Stadium: Maghrebi Unity Stadium; Referee: Haitham Ghouti; VAR: Akram Mechairia

=== Algerian Cup ===
5 February 2025 Round of 64	Olympique Akbou	1–0	CS Constantine	Béjaïa
15:00	Lachhab 3'	Report		Stadium: Maghrebi Unity Stadium; Referee: Houssam Benyahia

9 February 2025 Round of 32	Olympique Akbou	1–0	MJ Arzew	Béjaïa
15:00	Gherbi 64'	Report		Stadium: Maghrebi Unity Stadium; Referee: Zouhir Mansri

11 March 2025 Round of 16	MC El Bayadh	0–0 (a.e.t.) (6–5 p)	Olympique Akbou	El Bayadh
15:30		Report		Stadium: Zakaria Medjdoub Stadium; Referee: Oussama Mekfoudji
	Penalties
	El Moudene (penalty missed); Yaiche (penalty scored); Belaribi (penalty scored); El Orfi (penalty scored); Chahrour (penalty missed) ? (penalty scored); Barkat (penalty scored); Yerou (penalty missed); Salhi (penalty scored)		(penalty scored) Rahmouni; (penalty scored) Bouhalfaya; (penalty missed) Bitam; (penalty scored) Hathat; (penalty missed) Ghanem; (penalty scored) Sabri; (penalty scored) Hamadouche; (penalty missed) Klileche; (penalty missed) Bachir

== Squad information ==
=== Appearances and goals ===
As of 21 June 2025

No.	Pos	Player	Nat	Ligue 1			Algerian Cup			Total		
No.	Pos	Player	Nat	App	St	G	App	St	G	App	St	G
Goalkeepers
15	GK	Hatem Bencheikh El Fegoun	(Algeria)	28	28	0	1	1	0	29	29	0
16	GK	Benaouda Klileche	(Algeria)	2	2	0	2	2	0	4	4	0
Defenders
2	CB	Abdeldjalil Bahoussi	(Algeria)	19	14	0	2	2	0	21	16	0
3	LB	Mohammed Bouhalfaya	(Algeria)	2	2	0	1	1	0	3	3	0
4	CB	Slimane Bouteldja	(Algeria)	1	1	0	2	1	0	3	2	0
5	CB	Slimane Bouteldja	(Algeria)	29	29	1	2	2	0	31	31	1
14	CB	Tarek Adouane	(Algeria)	4	0	0	1	1	0	5	1	0
17	RB	Billal Boukaroum	(Algeria)	15	10	1	1	0	0	16	10	1
21	LB	Younes Ouassa	(Algeria)	21	21	2	2	2	0	23	23	2
24	LB	Yasser Chelfaoui	(Algeria)	20	16	1	1	1	0	21	17	1
Midfielders
6	DM	Louanes Zidi	(Algeria)	19	15	0	2	2	0	21	17	0
8	DM	Dhirar Bensaadallah	(Algeria)	14	11	0	1	0	0	15	11	0
13	CM	Sid Ali Lamri	(Algeria)	25	18	0	2	0	0	27	18	0
18	AM	Hicham Messiad	(Algeria)	27	19	1	2	2	0	29	21	0
20	CM	Toufik Addadi	(Algeria)	11	6	1	2	0	0	13	6	1
22	AM	Massinissa Benamara	(Algeria)	8	4	0	1	1	0	9	4	0
23	CM	Merouane Mehdaoui	(Algeria)	19	14	0	1	1	0	0	0	0
32	DM	Mohamed Chacha	(Algeria)	1	0	0	1	1	0	0	0	0
Forwards
7	LW	Abdelhak Askar	(Algeria)	27	19	3	2	2	0	29	21	3
9	ST	Mohamed Gherbi	(Algeria)	19	16	2	2	0	1	21	16	0
10	RW	Sofiane Fouad Lachahab	(Algeria)	26	13	1	2	2	1	28	15	2
11	ST	Lounes Adjout	(Algeria)	7	2	0	1	1	0	8	3	0
12	ST	Ali Haroun	(Algeria)	17	10	5	2	2	0	19	12	5
19	LW	Mohamed Hamadouche	(Algeria)	5	1	0	1	1	0	6	2	0
26	LW	Walid Zamoum	(Algeria)	25	21	2	2	2	0	27	23	2
27	ST	Omar Adrar	(Algeria)	22	8	1	1	1	0	23	9	1
Players transferred out during the season
~~1~~	GK	Mohamed El Amine Yacoubi	(Algeria)	0	0	0	0	0	0	0	0	0
~~4~~	CB	Zidane Mebarakou	(Algeria)	7	7	0	0	0	0	7	7	0
~~28~~	AM	Khalid Dahamni	(Algeria)	3	0	0	0	0	0	3	0	0
~~25~~	CM	Juba Oukaci	(Algeria)	13	11	0	0	0	0	13	11	0
~~11~~	RW	Ammar Oukil	(Algeria)	13	8	1	0	0	0	13	8	1
Total				30		24	3		2	33		26

Last updated: 21 June 2025
Source: mondefootball.fr

=== Goalscorers ===
As of 21 June 2025

Includes all competitive matches.

No.	Nat.	Player	Pos.	L1	AC	TOTAL
12	(Algeria)	Ali Haroun	ST	5	0	5
7	(Algeria)	Abdelhak Askar	LW	3	0	3
9	(Algeria)	Mohamed Gherbi	ST	2	1	3
26	(Algeria)	Walid Zamoum	LW	2	0	2
21	(Algeria)	Younes Ouassa	LB	2	0	2
10	(Algeria)	Sofiane Lachahab	RW	1	1	2
24	(Algeria)	Yasser Chelfaoui	LB	1	0	1
17	(Algeria)	Billal Boukaroum	RB	1	0	1
5	(Algeria)	Slimane Bouteldja	RB	1	0	1
20	(Algeria)	Hicham Messiad	AM	1	0	1
22	(Algeria)	Toufik Addadi	CM	1	0	1
11	(Algeria)	Ammar Oukil	RW	1	0	1
27	(Algeria)	Omar Adrar	ST	1	0	1
Own Goals				0	0	0
Totals				24	2	26

=== Clean sheets ===
As of 21 June 2025

					Clean sheets		
No.	Nat	Name	GP	GA	L 1	AC	Total
15	(Algeria)	Hatem Bencheikh El Fegoun	29	23	10	1	11
16	(Algeria)	Benaouda Klileche	4	0	2	2	4
		TOTALS		23	12	3	15
