= Uche Nwofor =

Nigerian footballer (born 1991)

Personal information
- Full name: Uche Innocent Nwofor
- Date of birth: 17 September 1991 (age 35)
- Place of birth: Lagos, Nigeria
- Height: 1.84 m (6 ft 0 in)
- Position: Striker

Senior career*
Years	Team	Apps	(Gls)
2008–2010	Anambra Pillars	19	(7)
2009–2010	→ Shooting Stars (loan)	?	(6)
2010–2011	Enugu Rangers	?	(5)
2011–2014	VVV-Venlo	57	(13)
2013–2014	→ Heerenveen (loan)	3	(0)
2014–2015	Lierse	11	(2)
2015–2016	Boavista	5	(2)
2016–2017	AS Trenčín	17	(2)
2017–2018	Rivers United	-	(-)
2018–2019	JS Kabylie	19	(4)

International career^{‡}
2011	Nigeria U20	4	(2)
2010–2014	Nigeria	9	(3)
- * Club domestic league appearances and goals as of 9 June 2017 ‡ National team caps and goals as of 11 June 2014

Uche Innocent Nwofor (born 17 September 1991) is a Nigerian former professional footballer who played as a striker.

== Club career ==
Born in Lagos, Nwofor began his career with Power United also called Anambra Pillars. He left in summer 2009 to go on loan to Nigerian premier league side Shooting Stars where he played for one season before joining Enugu Rangers.

Nwofor signed with VVV Venlo in August 2011, On 11 September 2011, he announced his arrival by scoring on his debut for Venlo in a 3–3 home draw with PSV Eindhoven in the Dutch top-flight on Sunday. In his first season, he scored four goals in the Eredivisie.

On 30 August 2013, Nwofor joined SC Heerenveen on a season-loan move.

On 12 September 2014, Nwofor joined Belgian club Lierse on a free transfer, signing a one-year contract.

== International career ==
In April 2011 Nwofor represented Nigeria under-20 team where he netted four goals in five games to finish highest goal scorer of the 2011 African Youth Championship as Nigeria won a sixth continental title in Johannesburg and he was named the Goal.com star of the week in the tournament.

In August 2011 Nwofor represented Nigeria in the FIFA U-20 World Cup in Colombia. He was an instant hit, coming off the bench to score two goals in six minutes against Croatia, Nigeria was subsequently knocked out by France in the quarter-finals in a 3–2 thriller.

Nwofor earned his first full-international cap for the Nigeria senior national team on 3 March 2010 in a friendly game against the Congo DR national football team. He was also instrumental when Nigeria's B team beat Republic of Benin 4–0 in the WAFU Nations Cup.

In July 2013, Nwofor was called up by the Nigerian national team for an international friendly match against South Africa in Durban on 14 August. He scored two goals in the 49th and 68th minutes as Nigeria won the match 2–0.

In the first of Super Eagles' World Cup warm-up matches of 2014, Nwofor scored a last-minute equaliser to spare Nigeria's blushes against an in-form Scotland. The match ended 2–2. Nwofor made the World Cup roster when it was announced three days later.
