= Massinissa Nezla =

Algerian footballer (born 1998)

Massinissa Nezla ⵎⴰⵙⵙⵉⵏⵉⵙⵙⴰ ⵏⴻⵣⵍⴰ
Personal information
- Full name: Massinissa Nezla
- Date of birth: 12 September 1998 (age 28)
- Place of birth: Ouaguenoun, Algeria
- Height: 1.77 m (5 ft 10 in)
- Position: Striker

Team information
- Current team: USM Khenchela
- Number: 15

Youth career
- ASC Ouaguenoun
- –2018: JS Kabylie

Senior career*
Years	Team	Apps	(Gls)
2018–2026	JS Kabylie	50	(10)
2025–2026	→ MB Rouissat (loan)	23	(2)
2026-	USM Khenchela	0	(0)

International career^{‡}
2021	Algeria Military		
2022	Algeria A'	1	(0)
- * Club domestic league appearances and goals as of 31 August 2026 ‡ National team caps and goals as of 29 September 2022

Massinissa Nezla (Arabic: ماسينسا نزلة; Tamazight: ⵎⴰⵙⵙⵉⵏⵉⵙⵙⴰ ⵏⴻⵣⵍⴰ; born 12 September 1998) is an Algerian professional footballer who plays as a striker for USM Khenchela.

== Career ==
Nezla was born in Ouaguenoun, Kabylia. On 29 September 2022 he made his Algeria A' national team debut, coming on in the 85th minute as a substitute in a friendly match against Sudan.

== Honours ==
JS Kabylie

- Algerian League Cup: 2020–21
- CAF Confederation Cup runner-up: 2020–21
