= Rezki Hamroune =

Algerian footballer (born 1996)

Rezki Hamroune ⵔⴻⵣⴽⵉ ⵀⴰⵎⵔⵓⵏⴻ
Personal information
- Full name: Rezki Hamroune
- Date of birth: March 10, 1996 (age 30)
- Place of birth: Kouba, Algeria
- Height: 1.77 m (5 ft 9 1/2 in)
- Position: Right winger

Team information
- Current team: MB Rouissat
- Number: 19

Youth career
- –2014: JSM Béjaïa

Senior career*
Years	Team	Apps	(Gls)
2014–2016	Dijon FCO B	14	(1)
2016	Wasquehal	11	(1)
2017	→ Is-Selongey (loan)	4	(0)
2017–2018	ASC Saint-Apollinaire	4	(1)
2018–2021	JS Kabylie	72	(20)
2021–2024	Pharco	61	(10)
2024–2025	CR Belouizdad	20	(4)
2025–2026	Olympique Akbou	18	(3)
2026–	MB Rouissat	0	(0)

International career^{‡}
2011–2012	Algeria U17		
2019	Algeria A'	1	(0)
- * Club domestic league appearances and goals as of 17 July 2026 ‡ National team caps and goals as of 21 September 2019

Rezki Hamroune (Arabic: رزقي حمرون; Tamazight: ⵔⴻⵣⴽⵉ ⵀⴰⵎⵔⵓⵏⴻ; born March 10, 1996) is an Algerian professional footballer who plays as a right winger for MB Rouissat.

== Personal life ==
Born in Kouba, Algiers Province, Rezki Hamroune is originally from the village of Ihitoussene, in Bouzeguene, Tizi Ouzou Province, Kabylia. He his the cousin of footballer Jugurtha Hamroun.

== Club career ==
In 2014, Rezki Hamroune signed a two-year professional contract with Dijon FCO, joining them on a free transfer from JSM Béjaïa.

In 2018, he signed a two-year contract with JS Kabylie. In 2021, he joined Egyptian Premier League side Pharco on a free transfer from JS Kabylie. On 7 August 2024, he signed for CR Belouizdad. On 25 August 2025, he joined Olympique Akbou. On 15 July 2026, he joined MB Rouissat.

== Honours ==
JS Kabylie

- Algerian League Cup: 2020–21
- CAF Confederation Cup runner-up: 2020–21
