= Walid Bencherifa =

Algerian footballer (1988)

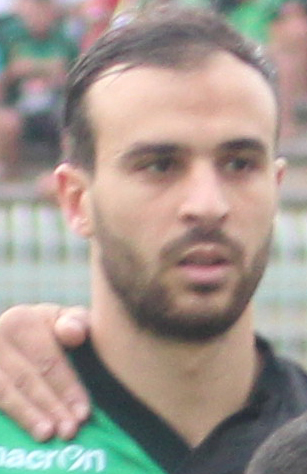

Personal information
- Full name: Mohamed Walid Bencherifa
- Date of birth: 6 November 1988 (age 37)
- Place of birth: Algiers, Algeria
- Height: 1.80 m (5 ft 11 in)
- Position: Defender

Team information
- Current team: Olympique Akbou
- Number: 21

Youth career
- OMR El Annasser

Senior career*
Years	Team	Apps	(Gls)
	OMR El Annasser	-	(-)
2010–2012	RC Kouba	-	(-)
2012–2014	JS Kabylie	48	(4)
2014–2019	CS Constantine	23	(0)
2019–2021	JS Kabylie	15	(1)
2021–2023	Olympique Club de Khouribga	54	(1)
2023–2025	IR Tanger	48	(3)
2025–	Olympique Akbou	23	(1)

International career
2019	Algeria	1	(0)
- * Club domestic league appearances and goals as of 6 June 2026

Mohamed Walid Bencherifa (Arabic: محمد وليد بن شريفة; born 6 November 1988) is an Algerian professional footballer who plays as a defender for Olympique Akbou .

== Club career ==
Bencherifa began his career with OMR El Annasser and RC Kouba, who he played for in the Algerian Ligue Professionnelle 2. He scored 7 goals for RC Kouba in the 2011–12 Algerian Ligue Professionnelle 2.

On 21 May 2012 Bencherifa signed a two-year contract with JS Kabylie.
