= Bilal Tizi Bouali =

Algerian footballer (born 1997)

Personal information
- Full name: Bilal Tizi Bouali
- Date of birth: 14 December 1997 (age 28)
- Place of birth: Algeria
- Height: 1.76 m (5 ft 9 in)
- Position: Center back

Team information
- Current team: JS Bordj Ménaïel

Youth career
- 2015–2016: JS Kabylie

Senior career*
Years	Team	Apps	(Gls)
2016–2021	JS Kabylie	53	(2)
2021–2022	WA Tlemcen	5	(0)
2022	Al-Minaa	0	(0)
2022–	JS Bordj Ménaïel	0	(0)

International career^{‡}
2016–2017	Algeria U20	2	(0)
2018–2019	Algeria U21	1	(0)
2019–	Algeria U23	1	(0)
- * Club domestic league appearances and goals as of 25 August 2022 ‡ National team caps and goals as of 19 February 2019

Bilal Tizi Bouali (Arabic: بلال تيزي بوعلي; born 14 December 1997) is an Algerian professional footballer who plays as a defender for JS Bordj Ménaïel.

== Honours ==
=== Club ===
JS Kabylie

- Algerian Ligue Professionnelle 1: Runner-up; 2018–19
- Algerian Cup: Runner-up; 2017–18
- Algerian League Cup: 2021
- CAF Confederation Cup: Runner-up; 2021
