= Malik Raiah =

Algerian footballer (born 1992)

Personal information
- Date of birth: 20 September 1992 (age 34)
- Place of birth: Algeria
- Position: Midfielder

Senior career*
Years	Team	Apps	(Gls)
2013–2018	JS Kabylie	112	(2)
2018–2019	NA Hussein Dey	22	(0)
2019–2021	JS Kabylie	36	(1)
2021–2022	CS Sfaxien	11	(1)
2022–2023	Al-Jabalain	16	(0)
2023	Al-Khaldiya SC		
- * Club domestic league appearances and goals as of 13 April 2022

Malik Raiah (born 20 September 1992) is an Algerian footballer who plays as a midfielder.

On 13 July 2022, Raiah joined Saudi Arabian club Al-Jabalain. On 30 January 2023, Raiah was released by Al-Jabalain.
