= Rédha Bensayah =

Algerian footballer (born 1994)

Rédha Bensayah ⵔⴻⴷⵀⴰ ⴱⴻⵏⵙⴰⵢⴰⵀ
Personal information
- Date of birth: August 22, 1994 (age 32)
- Place of birth: Bechloul, Algeria
- Height: 1.73 m (5 ft 8 in)
- Position: Right winger

Team information
- Current team: Al-Anwar
- Number: 99

Youth career
- –2014: MB Bouira
- 2014–2015: MO Béjaïa

Senior career*
| Years | Team | Apps | (Gls) |
| 2015 | MO Béjaïa | 0 | (0) |
| 2015–2016 | JSM Béjaïa | 9 | (0) |
| 2016–2017 | US Beni Douala | | |
| 2017–2019 | JSM Béjaïa | 40 | (6) |
| 2019–2022 | JS Kabylie | 82 | (19) |
| 2022–2023 | Al-Jabalain | 33 | (8) |
| 2023–2024 | Jeddah | 31 | (16) |
| 2024–2025 | Al-Adalah | 32 | (6) |
| 2025–2026 | CS Constantine | 13 | (0) |
| 2026– | Al-Anwar | 1 | (0) |

International career^{‡}
| 2019–2022 | Algeria A' | 6 | (4) |
- * Club domestic league appearances and goals as of 20 January 2026 ‡ National team caps and goals as of 9 June 2022

Rédha Bensayah (Arabic: رضا بن سايح, Tamazight: ⵔⴻⴷⵀⴰ ⴱⴻⵏⵙⴰⵢⴰⵀ; born August 22, 1994) is an Algerian professional footballer who plays as a right winger for Saudi club Al-Anwar.

== Club career ==
On 13 June 2019, Bensayah signed his first professional contract with JS Kabylie.

On 21 June 2022, he joined Saudi Arabian side Al-Jabalain.

On 23 June 2024, he joined Al-Adalah.

On 24 July 2025, Bensayah joined CS Constantine.

On 20 January 2026, he joined Al-Anwar.

== Honours ==
MO Béjaïa

- Algerian Cup: 2014–15

JSM Béjaïa

- Algerian Cup runner-up: 2018–19

JS Kabylie

- Algerian League Cup: 2020–21
- CAF Confederation Cup runner-up: 2020–21
