= Juba Oukaci =

Algerian footballer (born 1996)

Juba Oukaci ⵊⵓⴱⴰ ⵓⴽⴰⵙⵙⵉ
Personal information
- Full name: Juba Oukaci
- Date of birth: 8 July 1996 (age 30)
- Place of birth: Azazga, Algeria
- Height: 1.71 m (5 ft 7 1/2 in)
- Position: Central midfielder

Team information
- Current team: MO Béjaïa
- Number: 22

Youth career
- 2007–2014: JS Kabylie

Senior career*
Years	Team	Apps	(Gls)
2014–2023	JS Kabylie	118	(5)
2023	Smouha	0	(0)
2023–2024	MC Oran	6	(0)
2024–2025	Olympique Akbou	13	(0)
2025–2026	JS Saoura	19	(0)
2026	RC Kouba		
2026–	MO Béjaïa		

International career^{‡}
2021	Algeria A'	3	(0)
- * Club domestic league appearances and goals as of 11 September 2026 ‡ National team caps and goals as of 9 October 2021

Juba Oukaci (Arabic: يوبا أوقاسي; Tamazight: ⵊⵓⴱⴰ ⵓⴽⴰⵙⵙⵉ; born 8 July 1996) is an Algerian professional footballer who plays as a central midfielder for MO Béjaïa.

== Career ==
After three years of being promoted on the first team he made his senior league debut in the championship for JS Kabylie on 25 March 2017, coming on in the 90th minute of the game as a substitute against MC Alger. In August 2023, he joined MC Oran. On 5 February 2026, he joined RC Kouba. On 24 August 2026, he joined MO Béjaïa.

== Honours ==
JS Kabylie

- Algerian League Cup: 2020–21
- CAF Confederation Cup runner-up: 2020–21
- Algerian Cup runner-up: 2017–18
