= 2023–24 USM Khenchela season =

USM Khenchela
2023–24 season
- President: Walid Boukrouma
- Head coach: Mourad Okbi (from 19 August 2023) (until 13 November 2023); Nadhir Leknaoui (from 15 November 2023) (until 18 December 2023); Yamen Zelfani (from 14 February 2024) (until 4 April 2024); Moufdi Cherdoud (from 2 May 2024)
- Stadium: Amar Hamam Stadium
- Ligue 1: 10th
- Algerian Cup: Round of 16
- Top goalscorer: League: Tosin Omoyele (9 goals); All: Tosin Omoyele (10 goals)
- Biggest win: USM Khenchela 4–0 WA Boufarik
- Biggest defeat: ASO Chlef 4–1 USM Khenchela
Home colours	Away colours	Third colours

The 2023–24 season, was USM Khenchela's 4th season and the club's 2nd consecutive season in the top flight of Algerian football. In addition to the domestic league, USM Khenchela participated in the Algerian Cup.

== Squad list ==
Players and squad numbers last updated on 5 February 2024.
Note: Flags indicate national team as has been defined under FIFA eligibility rules. Players may hold more than one non-FIFA nationality.

No.	Nat.	Position	Name	Date of Birth (Age)	Signed from
Goalkeepers
1	(Algeria)	GK	Oussama Filali	24 July 1998 (aged 25)	(Algeria) US Chaouia
16	(Algeria)	GK	Sofiane Khedairia	1 April 1989 (aged 34)	(Saudi Arabia) Al-Shoulla
Defenders
5	(Algeria)	CB	Nabil Saâdou	7 March 1990 (aged 33)	(Saudi Arabia) Al-Jabalain FC
6	(Algeria)	CB	Hocine Laribi	17 November 1991 (aged 32)	(Algeria) NC Magra
12	(Algeria)	LB	Oussama Kaddour	12 May 1997 (aged 26)	(Algeria) Olympique de Médéa
21	(Algeria)	CB	Hamza Rebiai	11 January 1994 (aged 29)	(Algeria) CS Constantine
22	(Algeria)	RB	Mohamed Guemroud	28 August 1994 (aged 29)	(Algeria) JS Kabylie
25	(Algeria)	CB	Abdelhafid Hoggas	1 January 1992 (aged 31)	(Algeria) MO Constantine
26	(Algeria)	RB	Abdellah Meddah	8 March 1999 (aged 24)	(Algeria) ASO Chlef
Midfielders
8	(Algeria)	MF	Abdelhakim Sameur	12 November 1990 (aged 32)	(Algeria) US Biskra
10	(Algeria)	MF	Mohamed Yacine Athmani	13 May 1991 (aged 32)	(Algeria) US Biskra
11	(Algeria)	MF	Hacène Ogbi	17 August 1989 (aged 34)	(Bahrain) Al-Muharraq
18	(Algeria)	MF	Ahmed Gagaâ	15 January 1994 (aged 29)	(Saudi Arabia) Al-Entesar
24	(Algeria)	MF	Moussa Coulibaly	15 February 1995 (aged 28)	(Djibouti) AS Arta/Solar7
27	(Algeria)	MF	Sid Ali Lamri	3 February 1991 (aged 32)	(Algeria) HB Chelghoum Laïd
Forwards
7	(Algeria)	FW	Chouaib Debbih	1 January 1993 (aged 31)	(Algeria) MC Alger
9	(Algeria)	FW	Ilyes Yaiche	27 October 1997 (aged 25)	(Kuwait) Qadsia SC
13	(Algeria)	FW	Mohamed Amine Semahi	22 June 1999 (aged 24)	(Algeria) WA Tlemcen
14	(Mali)	FW	Diadié Samadiaré	9 February 2000 (aged 23)	Free agent
17	(Algeria)	FW	Karim Sabouni	13 September 1997 (aged 26)	(Algeria) MSP Batna
20	(Nigeria)	FW	Tosin Omoyele	3 August 1996 (aged 27)	(Nigeria) Enyimba

== Transfers ==
=== In ===
==== Summer ====
Date	Pos	Player	Moving from	Fee	Source
17 August 2023	MF	(Algeria) Hacène Ogbi	(Bahrain) Al-Muharraq	Free transfer	
17 August 2023	MF	(Algeria) Ahmed Gagaâ	(Saudi Arabia) Al-Entesar	Free transfer	
17 August 2023	DF	(Algeria) Hamza Rebai	CS Constantine	Free transfer	
21 August 2023	FW	(Algeria) Karim Sabouni	MSP Batna	Free transfer	
21 August 2023	GK	(Algeria) Sofiane Khedairia	(Saudi Arabia) Al-Shoulla	Free transfer	
27 August 2023	DF	(Algeria) Abderrazak Benamraoui	(Libya) Al Tahaddy SC	Free transfer	
27 August 2023	DF	(Algeria) Mohamed Guemroud	JS Kabylie	Free transfer	
27 August 2023	MF	(Algeria) Abdelmalek Elmenaouer	ASM Oran	Free transfer	
30 August 2023	FW	(Algeria) Lahouari Touil	(Saudi Arabia) Al-Ain	Free transfer	
9 September 2023	DF	(Algeria) Abdeljalil Medioub	(Cyprus) Aris Limassol	Free transfer	
9 September 2023	MF	(Rwanda) Djabel Manishimwe	(Rwanda) APR F.C.	Free transfer	

==== Winter ====
Date	Pos	Player	Moving from	Fee	Source
5 February 2024	DF	(Algeria) Hocine Laribi	NC Magra	Free transfer	
5 February 2024	FW	(Algeria) Chouaib Debbih	MC Alger	Free transfer	
5 February 2024	FW	(Mali) Diadié Samadiaré	Free agent	Free transfer	
5 February 2024	MF	(Mali) Moussa Coulibaly	(Djibouti) AS Arta/Solar7	Free transfer	

=== Out ===
==== Summer ====
Date	Pos	Player	Moving to	Fee	Source
25 July 2023	DF	(Algeria) Aymen Attou	Free agent	Free transfer	
27 July 2023	FW	(Algeria) Sofiane Bayazid	MC Alger	Undisclosed	
13 August 2023	DF	(Algeria) Achref Aïb	NC Magra	Free transfer	
17 August 2023	GK	(Algeria) Abdelhamid Brahimi	US Souf	Free transfer	
19 August 2023	MF	(Algeria) Fouad Haddad	NC Magra	Free transfer	

==== Winter ====
Date	Pos	Player	To club	Transfer fee	Source
27 November 2023	DF	(Algeria) Abdeljalil Medioub	Free agent	Free transfer (Released)	
30 January 2024	FW	(Ghana) Maxwell Baakoh	MC Oran	40,000,000 DA	
30 January 2024	MF	(Rwanda) Djabel Manishimwe	Free agent	Free transfer (Released)	
30 January 2024	FW	(Algeria) Lahouari Touil	Free agent	Free transfer (Released)	

== Competitions ==
=== Overview ===
Competition	Record								Started round	Final position / round	First match	Last match
Competition	G	W	D	L	GF	GA	GD	Win %	Started round	Final position / round	First match	Last match
Ligue 1	30	11	6	13	33	39	−6	36.67	—N/a	10th	15 September 2023	14 June 2024
Algerian Cup	3	2	0	1	8	4	+4	66.67	Round of 64	Round of 16	3 February 2024	30 March 2024
Total	33	13	6	14	41	43	−2	39.39				

Updated to match played 14 June 2024
Source: Competitions

=== Ligue 1 ===
==== League table ====
Pos	Team	Pld	W	D	L	GF	GA	GD	Pts
8	ASO Chlef	30	11	8	11	41	40	+1	41
9	JS Saoura	30	11	7	12	34	37	−3	40
10	USM Khenchela	30	11	6	13	33	39	−6	39
11	MC El Bayadh	30	10	8	12	29	30	−1	38
12	NC Magra	30	9	11	10	30	32	−2	38

Source: the-sports.org
Rules for classification: 1) points; 2) head-to-head points; 3) head-to-head goal difference; 4) goal difference; 5) total goals; 6) fairplay ranking; 7) playoff.

==== Results summary ====
Overall								Home						Away					
Pld	W	D	L	GF	GA	GD	Pts	W	D	L	GF	GA	GD	W	D	L	GF	GA	GD
30	11	6	13	33	39	−6	39	8	4	3	18	11	+7	3	2	10	15	28	−13

Last updated: 14 June 2024.
Source: Competitive matches

==== Results by round ====
Round	1	2	3	4	5	6	7	8	9	10	11	12	13	14	15	16	17	18	19	20	21	22	23	24	25	26	27	28	29	30
Ground	H	A	H	A	H	A	H	A	H	A	H	A	H	A	H	A	H	A	H	A	H	A	H	A	H	A	H	A	H	A
Result	W	L	W	W	L	L	D	L	W	L	W	W	W	D	L	L	W	D	W	L	D	L	L	L	D	L	W	W	D	L
Position	8	12	6	3	6	9	9	13	9	12	9	7	4	6	7	9	8	7	6	7	7	8	8	11	10	13	9	9	9	10

Updated to match(es) played on 14 June 2024. Source: Competitive matches
A = Away; H = Home; W = Win; D = Draw; L = Loss

==== Matches ====
The league fixtures were announced on 24 August 2023.

All times are local, WAT (UTC+1).

Win Draw Loss Postponed

15 September 2023 Round 1	USM Khenchela	1–0	ES Sétif	Khenchela
16:00	Kaddour 61'	Report		Stadium: Amar Hamam Stadium; Referee: Houssam Benyahia

29 September 2023 Round 3	USM Khenchela	2–1	JS Kabylie	Khenchela
15:45	Baakoh 54' (pen.); Ogbi 80' (pen.)	Report	Aït-Atmane 71'	Stadium: Amar Hamam Stadium; Referee: Mustapha Ghorbal

7 October 2023 Round 4	CR Belouizdad	2–3	USM Khenchela	Belouizdad
15:45	Saâdou 25' (o.g.); Darfalou (45-2)	Report	Omoyele 7'; Rebai 43'; Ogbi 90' (pen.)	Stadium: 20 August 1955 Stadium; Referee: Abdellah Benchehida

14 October 2023 Round 2	USM Alger	3–0	USM Khenchela	Dar El Beïda
15:30	Benzaza 67'; Bouziane 69'; Ait El Hadj 90+3'	Report		Stadium: Omar Benrabah Stadium; Referee: Youcef Tayeb Bouderbal

11 November 2023 Round 5	USM Khenchela	0–1	US Biskra	Khenchela
15:00		Report	Khoualed 90+4'	Stadium: Amar Hamam Stadium; Referee: Mohamed Belkebir

17 November 2023 Round 6	MC Oran	1–0	USM Khenchela	Bir El Djir
16:45	Bengrina 19'	Report		Stadium: Miloud Hadefi Stadium; Referee: Hamza Bouslimani

25 November 2023 Round 7	USM Khenchela	0–0	ES Ben Aknoun	Khenchela
15:00		Report		Stadium: Amar Hamam Stadium; Referee: Bilal Bendjahene

1 December 2023 Round 8	CS Constantine	2–0	USM Khenchela	Constantine
18:00	Benchaâ 16'; Dib 62' (pen.)	Report		Stadium: Chahid Hamlaoui Stadium; Referee: Lyes Bekouassa

8 December 2023 Round 9	USM Khenchela	2–0	MC El Bayadh	Khenchela
15:15	Yaiche 11'; Baakoh 90+3'	Report		Stadium: Amar Hamam Stadium; Referee: Houssam Benyahia

16 December 2023 Round 10	MC Alger	3–0	USM Khenchela	Algiers
18:00	Naidji 4', 49', 80'	Report		Stadium: Stade du 5 Juillet; Referee: Nabil Boukhalfa

29 December 2023 Round 11	USM Khenchela	2–1	ASO Chlef	Khenchela
15:15	Omoyele 46', 90+2'	Report	Kerroum 48'	Stadium: Amar Hamam Stadium; Referee: Abdelmoumen Touabti

6 January 2024 Round 12	JS Saoura	0–1	USM Khenchela	Béchar
16:00		Report	Kaddour 72'	Stadium: 20 August 1955 Stadium; Referee: Yahia Dahar

13 January 2024 Round 13	USM Khenchela	2–0	US Souf	Khenchela
15:00	Sabouni 73'; Baakoh 78'	Report		Stadium: Amar Hamam Stadium; Referee: Anes Azrine

19 January 2024 Round 14	NC Magra	1–1	USM Khenchela	Magra
15:30	Laidouni 90+6'	Report	Guemroud 65'	Stadium: Boucheligue Brothers Stadium; Referee: Mohamed Belkebir

26 January 2024 Round 15	USM Khenchela	1–2	Paradou AC	Khenchela
15:30	Baakoh 29' (pen.)	Report	Titraoui 47'; Kohili 90+4'	Stadium: Amar Hamam Stadium; Referee: Said Aouina

9 February 2024 Round 16	ES Sétif	2–1	USM Khenchela	Sétif
16:45	Oukil 42'; Lahmeri 79' (pen.)	Report	Sameur 83' (pen.)	Stadium: 8 May 1945 Stadium; Referee: Nabil Boukhalfa

16 February 2024 Round 17	USM Khenchela	1–0	USM Alger	Khenchela
15:30	Sameur 19' (pen.)	Report		Stadium: Amar Hamam Stadium; Referee: Abderahmane Sahraoui

24 February 2024 Round 18	JS Kabylie	0–0	USM Khenchela	Tizi Ouzou
16:00		Report		Stadium: 1 November 1954 Stadium; Referee: Ayoub Belhachemi

16 March 2024 Round 20	US Biskra	2–1	USM Khenchela	Biskra
22:00	Medane 3'; Boukarroum 68'	Report	Lamri 23'	Stadium: 18 February Stadium; Referee: Lahlou Benbraham

23 March 2024 Round 21	USM Khenchela	0–0	MC Oran	Khenchela
15:50		Report		Stadium: Amar Hamam Stadium; Referee: Hamza Bouslimani

6 April 2024 Round 22	ES Ben Aknoun	3–2	USM Khenchela	Belouizdad
15:45	Toual 12'; Hadji 46'; Deghmani 87'	Report	Omoyele 35'; Debbih 90+2'	Stadium: 20 August 1955 Stadium; Referee: Alaa Bouab

19 April 2024 Round 23	USM Khenchela	1–2	CS Constantine	Khenchela
16:00	Omoyele 11'	Report	Temine 4'; Rebai 57' (o.g.)	Stadium: Amar Hamam Stadium; Referee: Lyes Bekouassa

26 April 2024 Round 24	MC El Bayadh	1–0	USM Khenchela	El Bayadh
16:00	Benzid 21'	Report		Stadium: Zakaria Medjdoub Stadium; Referee: Fodil Oukil

4 May 2024 Round 19	USM Khenchela	2–1	CR Belouizdad	Khenchela
16:00	Saâdou 47'; Sameur 90' (pen.)	Report	Meziane 64'	Stadium: Amar Hamam Stadium; Referee: Lahlou Benbraham

11 May 2024 Round 25	USM Khenchela	1–1	MC Alger	Khenchela
17:00	Sameur 12' (pen.)	Report	Belaïli 22'	Stadium: Amar Hamam Stadium; Referee: Houssam Benyahia

17 May 2024 Round 26	ASO Chlef	4–1	USM Khenchela	Chlef
17:00	Agbagno 8', 47'; Farhi 42'; Aliane 83'	Report	Saâdou 11'	Stadium: Mohamed Boumezrag Stadium; Referee: Abderahmane Sahraoui

26 May 2024 Round 27	USM Khenchela	1–0	JS Saoura	Khenchela
16:45	Omoyele 77'	Report		Stadium: Amar Hamam Stadium; Referee: Rafik Aouina

7 June 2024 Round 28	US Souf	2–5	USM Khenchela	El Oued
16:45	Hadj Saad 52', 80'	Report	Omoyele 1', 67', 69'; Sabouni 18'; Debbih 40'	Stadium: 1 November 1954 Stadium; Referee: Djameleddine Zenati

11 June 2024 Round 29	USM Khenchela	2–2	NC Magra	Khenchela
16:45	Sabouni 9', 54'	Report	Dadache 55'; Demane 64'	Stadium: Amar Hamam Stadium; Referee: Lotfi Bekouassa

14 June 2024 Round 30	Paradou AC	2–0	USM Khenchela	Dar El Beïda
16:45	Boulbina 3', 11' (pen.)	Report		Stadium: Omar Benrabah Stadium; Referee: Mohamed Amine Bouteraa

=== Algerian Cup ===
3 February 2024 Round of 64	USM Khenchela	4–0	WA Boufarik	Khenchela
13:45	Sameur 16' (pen.); Ogbi 39'; Omoyele 55'; Saâdou 58'	Report		Stadium: Amar Hamam Stadium; Referee: Fateh Harkat
Note: USM Khenchela Lineups: Filali, Saâdou, Hoggas, Kaddour (substituted off) 61' (Saidi (substituted on) 61'), Guemroud, Lamri, Sameur (substituted off) 61' (Mouassi (substituted on) 61'), Ogbi, Yaiche, Semahi (substituted off) 20' (Meddah (substituted on) 20'), Omoyele.

8 March 2024 Round of 32	USM Khenchela	3–2 (a.e.t.)	GC Mascara	Khenchela
15:00	Sabouni 19' (pen.); Semahi 20'; Rebai 99'	Report	Benchenane 41'; Larbi 50'	Stadium: Amar Hamam Stadium; Referee: Mohamed Amine Chaoubi
Note: USM Khenchela Lineups: Filali, Saâdou, Rebiai, Kaddour (substituted off) 105' (Meddah (substituted on) 105'), Guemroud, Hoggas (substituted off) 81' (Sameur (substituted on) 81'), Laribi (substituted off) 58' (Debbih (substituted on) 58'), Coulibaly, Semahi (substituted off) 58' (Yaiche (substituted on) 58'), Omoyele (substituted off) 105' (Ogbi (substituted on) 105'), Sabouni.

30 March 2024 Round of 16	USM Khenchela	1–2	MC Alger	Khenchela
15:30	Sameur 55' (pen.)	Report	Belaïli 11' (pen.); Bayazid 45'	Stadium: Amar Hamam Stadium; Referee: Youcef Gamouh
Note: USM Khenchela Lineups: Khedairia, Rebai, Hoggas, Kaddour (substituted off) 46' (Meddah (substituted on) 46'), Guemroud, Lamri, Sameur, Debbih (substituted off) 86' (Coulibaly (substituted on) 86'), Yaiche (substituted off) 58' (Sabouni (substituted on) 58'), Samadiaré (substituted off) 72' (Ogbi (substituted on) 72' (substituted off) 86' (Semahi (substituted on) 86'), Omoyele.

== Squad information ==
=== Playing statistics ===
No.	Pos	Nat	Player	Total		Ligue 1		Algerian Cup	
No.	Pos	Nat	Player	Apps	Goals	Apps	Goals	Apps	Goals
Goalkeepers
1	GK	(Algeria) ALG	Oussama Filali	7	0	5	0	2	0
16	GK	(Algeria) ALG	Sofiane Khedairia	26	0	25	0	1	0
Defenders
5	DF	(Algeria) ALG	Nabil Saâdou	25	3	23	2	2	1
6	DF	(Algeria) ALG	Hocine Laribi	3	0	2	0	1	0
12	DF	(Algeria) ALG	Oussama Kaddour	31	2	28	2	3	0
21	DF	(Algeria) ALG	Hamza Rebai	30	2	28	1	2	1
22	DF	(Algeria) ALG	Mohamed Guemroud	30	1	27	1	3	0
25	DF	(Algeria) ALG	Abdelhafid Hoggas	25	0	22	0	3	0
26	DF	(Algeria) ALG	Abdellah Meddah	12	0	9	0	3	0
Midfielders
8	MF	(Algeria) ALG	Abdelhakim Sameur	27	6	24	4	3	2
10	MF	(Algeria) ALG	Mohamed Yacine Athmani	5	0	5	0	0	0
11	MF	(Algeria) ALG	Hacène Ogbi	26	3	23	2	3	1
18	MF	(Algeria) ALG	Ahmed Gagaâ	8	0	8	0	0	0
24	MF	(Mali) MLI	Moussa Coulibaly	15	0	13	0	2	0
27	MF	(Algeria) ALG	Sid Ali Lamri	31	1	29	1	2	0
42	MF	(Algeria) ALG	Zakaria Saidi	1	0	0	0	1	0
43	MF	(Algeria) ALG	Idris Mouassi	1	0	0	0	1	0
Forwards
7	FW	(Algeria) ALG	Chouaib Debbih	14	2	12	2	2	0
9	FW	(Algeria) ALG	Ilyes Yaiche	31	1	29	1	2	0
13	FW	(Algeria) ALG	Mohamed Amine Semahi	24	1	21	0	3	1
14	FW	(Mali) MLI	Diadié Samadiaré	9	0	8	0	1	0
17	FW	(Algeria) ALG	Karim Sabouni	30	5	28	4	2	1
20	FW	(Nigeria) NGR	Tosin Omoyele	31	10	28	9	3	1
Players transferred out during the season
2	DF	(Algeria) ALG	Abdeljalil Medioub	2	0	2	0	0	0
14	MF	(Rwanda) RWA	Djabel Manishimwe	3	0	3	0	0	0
7	FW	(Algeria) ALG	Lahouari Touil	11	0	11	0	0	0
19	FW	(Ghana) GHA	Maxwell Baakoh	11	4	11	4	0	0

Last updated: 14 June 2024
Source: soccerway.com

=== Goalscorers ===
As of 14 June 2024

Includes all competitive matches. The list is sorted alphabetically by surname when total goals are equal.

No.	Nat.	Player	Pos.	L 1	AC	TOTAL
20	(Nigeria)	Tosin Omoyele	FW	9	1	10
8	(Algeria)	Abdelhakim Sameur	MF	4	2	6
17	(Algeria)	Karim Sabouni	FW	4	1	5
19	(Ghana)	Maxwell Baakoh	FW	4	0	4
11	(Algeria)	Hacène Ogbi	MF	2	1	3
5	(Algeria)	Nabil Saâdou	DF	2	1	3
7	(Algeria)	Chouaib Debbih	FW	2	0	2
12	(Algeria)	Oussama Kaddour	DF	2	0	2
21	(Algeria)	Hamza Rebai	DF	1	1	2
11	(Algeria)	Ilyes Yaiche	FW	1	0	1
22	(Algeria)	Mohamed Guemroud	DF	1	0	1
13	(Algeria)	Mohamed Amine Semahi	FW	0	1	1
21	(Algeria)	Sid Ali Lamri	MF	1	0	1
Own Goals				0	0	0
Totals				33	8	41
