= 2024–25 USM Khenchela season =

USM Khenchela
2024–25 season
- President: Walid Boukrouma
- Head coach: Hatem Missaoui (from 4 August 2024) (until 30 October 2024); Chérif Hadjar (from 11 November 2024) (until 18 February 2025); Hocine Achiou (from 13 April 2025)
- Stadium: Amar Hamam Stadium
- Ligue 1: 9th
- Algerian Cup: Round of 64
- Top goalscorer: League: Hamid Djaouchi (9 goals); All: Hamid Djaouchi (9 goals)
- Biggest win: USM Khenchela 2–0 ES Mostaganem
- Biggest defeat: Paradou AC 4–0 USM Khenchela
Home colours	Away colours	Third colours

The 2024–25 season, is USM Khenchela's 5th season and the club's 3rd consecutive season in the top flight of Algerian football. In addition to the domestic league, USM Khenchela are participating in the Algerian Cup. On June 27, 2024, The federal office approved the calendar for the 2024–25 Ligue 1 season with the aim of ending on May 31, 2025. The first round is scheduled for September 14, this delay is motivated both by an extended end of the 2023–24 season but also by the holding of early presidential elections which will take place on September 7, 2024. However, the Ligue de Football Professionnel decided to postpone the start of the Ligue 1 by a week, on September 21.

On August 1, 2024, Algérie Télécom and Union Sportive de la Médina Khenchela have signed a partnership agreement, making Algérie Télécom the official sponsor. The signing ceremony took place at the headquarters of the General Directorate of Algérie Télécom in Algiers, in the presence of the Chairman and CEO of Algérie Télécom and the President of USM Khenchela Walid Boukrouma. Knowing that Algérie Télécom has started procedures to buy the club, this partnership is part of a global approach aimed at supporting the club in the development and strengthening of its capacities for the 2024–25 season.

== Squad list ==
Players and squad numbers last updated on 5 February 2025.
Note: Flags indicate national team as has been defined under FIFA eligibility rules. Players may hold more than one non-FIFA nationality.

No.	Nat.	Name	Position	Date of birth (age)	Signed from
Goalkeepers
1	(Algeria)	Sofiane Khedairia	GK	1 April 1989 (aged 35)	(Saudi Arabia) Al-Shoulla
16	(Algeria)	Oussama Litim	GK	3 June 1990 (aged 34)	(Algeria) MC Alger
Defenders
2	(Algeria)	Aymen Chaaraoui	RB	26 July 1997 (aged 27)	(Algeria) US Souf
5	(Algeria)	Nabil Saâdou	CB	7 March 1990 (aged 34)	(Saudi Arabia) Al-Jabalain FC
12	(Algeria)	Oussama Kaddour	LB	12 May 1997 (aged 27)	(Algeria) Olympique de Médéa
21	(Algeria)	Hamza Rebiai	CB	11 January 1994 (aged 30)	(Algeria) CS Constantine
22	(Algeria)	Mohamed Guemroud	RB	28 August 1994 (aged 30)	(Algeria) JS Kabylie
25	(Algeria)	Abdelhafid Hoggas	CB	1 January 1992 (aged 32)	(Algeria) MO Constantine
Midfielders
6	(Algeria)	Ahmida Zenasni	DM	10 July 1993 (aged 31)	(Algeria) ASO Chlef
8	(Algeria)	Abdelhakim Sameur (C.)	DM	12 November 1990 (aged 33)	(Algeria) US Biskra
11	(Algeria)	Mohamed Islam Bakir	CM	13 July 1996 (aged 28)	(Algeria) CR Belouizdad
14	(Democratic Republic of the Congo)	Christopher Ngolo	DM / CM	24 July 2000 (aged 24)	(Democratic Republic of the Congo) AS Vita Club
15	(Algeria)	Badreddine Touki	DM	25 September 1999 (aged 24)	(Algeria) WA Boufarik
20	(Algeria)	Samir Aiboud	CM	11 February 1993 (aged 31)	(Saudi Arabia) Mudhar
24	(Algeria)	Zakaria Saidi	DM	23 April 2002 (aged 22)	(Algeria) Reserve team
26	(Algeria)	Mohamed Reda Boumechra	AM	3 June 1997 (aged 27)	(Algeria) JS Kabylie
Forwards
7	(Algeria)	Chouaib Debbih	LW	1 January 1993 (aged 31)	(Algeria) MC Alger
9	(Cameroon)	William Matam	ST	4 November 1997 (aged 26)	(Oman) Al-Seeb
10	(Algeria)	Ammar Oukil	RW	7 July 1996 (aged 28)	(Algeria) Olympique Akbou
19	(Republic of the Congo)	Prince Ibara	ST	7 February 1996 (aged 28)	(Vietnam) Hong Linh Ha Tinh
27	(Algeria)	Hamid Djaouchi	ST	19 December 1994 (aged 29)	(Saudi Arabia) Al-Diriyah Club

== Transfers ==
=== In ===
==== Summer ====
Date	Pos	Player	Moving from	Fee	Source
5 August 2024	FW	(Republic of the Congo) Prince Ibara	(Vietnam) Hong Linh Ha Tinh	Free transfer	
5 August 2024	GK	(Algeria) Oussama Litim	MC Alger	Free transfer	
5 August 2024	MF	(Algeria) Mohamed Reda Boumechra	JS Kabylie	Free transfer	
5 August 2024	DM	(Algeria) Ahmida Zenasni	ASO Chlef	Free transfer	
5 August 2024	RB	(Algeria) Aymen Chaaraoui	US Souf	Free transfer	
5 August 2024	MF	(Algeria) Mohamed Islam Bakir	CR Belouizdad	Free transfer	
5 August 2024	FW	(Algeria) Hamid Djaouchi	(Saudi Arabia) Al-Qaisumah	Free transfer	
5 August 2024	MF	(Algeria) Samir Aiboud	(Saudi Arabia) Mudhar	Free transfer	
5 August 2024	DF	(Algeria) Amar Khaled Nèche	(Saudi Arabia) Al-Qaisumah	Free transfer	
7 August 2024	LB	(Ivory Coast) Moise Gbai	(Ivory Coast) SOL FC	Free transfer	
13 August 2024	CB	(Benin) Irenée Togbedji Glele	(Democratic Republic of the Congo) AS Vita Club	Free transfer	
20 August 2024	CB	(Algeria) Ibrahim Hachoud	(Libya) Al-Ittihad	Free transfer	
10 September 2024	DM	(Algeria) Badreddine Touki	MC Alger	Free transfer	

=== Out ===
==== Summer ====
Date	Pos	Player	Moving to	Fee	Source
10 July 2024	RB	(Algeria) Abdellah Meddah	ES Mostaganem	Free transfer	
18 July 2024	FW	(Nigeria) Tosin Omoyele	CS Constantine	Free transfer	
24 July 2024	CM	(Algeria) Sid Ali Lamri	Olympique Akbou	Free transfer	

==== Winter ====
Date	Pos	Player	Moving to	Fee	Source
25 January 2025	CB	(Algeria) Ibrahim Hachoud	(Libya) Al-Hilal SC	300,000 €	

== Competitions ==
=== Overview ===
Competition	Record								Started round	Final position / round	First match	Last match
Competition	G	W	D	L	GF	GA	GD	Win %	Started round	Final position / round	First match	Last match
Ligue 1	30	11	7	12	28	38	−10	36.67	—N/a	9th	27 September 2024	20 June 2025
Algerian Cup	1	0	0	1	1	2	−1	0.00	Round of 64	Round of 64	2 January 2025	2 January 2025
Total	31	11	7	13	29	40	−11	35.48				

Updated to match played 20 June 2025
Source: Competitions

=== Ligue 1 ===
==== League table ====
Pos	Team	Pld	W	D	L	GF	GA	GD	Pts	Qualification or relegation
7	USM Alger	30	10	10	10	26	26	0	40	Qualification for Confederation Cup (Note: USMA Alger qualified for the 2025–26 CAF Confederation Cup by winning the 2024–25 Algerian Cup)
8	MC Oran	30	12	4	14	32	33	−1	40	
9	USM Khenchela	30	11	7	12	28	38	−10	40	
10	CS Constantine	30	9	12	9	31	31	0	39	
11	Olympique Akbou	30	9	10	11	24	23	+1	37	

Source: the-sports.org
Rules for classification: 1) points; 2) head-to-head points; 3) head-to-head goal difference; 4) goal difference; 5) total goals; 6) fairplay ranking; 7) playoff.

==== Results summary ====
Overall								Home						Away					
Pld	W	D	L	GF	GA	GD	Pts	W	D	L	GF	GA	GD	W	D	L	GF	GA	GD
30	11	7	12	28	38	−10	40	8	3	4	16	14	+2	3	4	8	12	24	−12

Last updated: 20 June 2025.
Source: Competitive matches

==== Results by round ====
Round	1	2	3	4	5	6	7	8	9	10	11	12	13	14	15	16	17	18	19	20	21	22	23	24	25	26	27	28	29	30
Ground	H	A	H	A	H	A	H	A	H	A	H	H	A	H	A	A	H	A	H	A	H	A	H	A	H	A	A	H	A	H
Result	D	D	W	D	L	L	W	L	W	D	W	L	L	D	W	L	L	L	W	D	L	L	D	L	W	L	W	W	W	W
Position	10	10	4	5	9	12	9	13	8	10	7	9	11	12	9	10	13	13	11	11	13	13	13	14	12	13	12	11	10	9

Updated to match(es) played on 20 June 2025. Source: Competitive matches
A = Away; H = Home; W = Win; D = Draw; L = Loss

==== Matches ====
The league fixtures were announced on 11 July 2024.

All times are local, WAT (UTC+1).

Win Draw Loss Postponed

27 September 2024 Round 2	JS Saoura	1–1	USM Khenchela	Béchar
16:00	Boutiche 79' (pen.)	Report	Kaddour 27'	Stadium: 20 August 1955 Stadium; Referee: Tayeb Benyabka

2 October 2024 Round 1	USM Khenchela	0–0	CR Belouizdad	Khenchela
16:00		Report		Stadium: Amar Hamam Stadium; Referee: Yahia Dehar

6 October 2024 Round 3	USM Khenchela	2–0	ES Mostaganem	Khenchela
16:00	Bakir 20', 78'	Report		Stadium: Amar Hamam Stadium; Referee: Lotfi Bekouassa

18 October 2024 Round 5	USM Khenchela	0–1	MC Alger	Khenchela
16:00		Report	Halaïmia 35'	Stadium: Amar Hamam Stadium; Referee: Youcef Gamouh

22 October 2024 (Note: The match between ASO Chlef and USM Khenchela is postponed from October 12, to October 22, 2024, due to the presence of three players from ASO Chlef with their national teams, Mohutsiwa with Botswana, Mahamadou Moussa with Niger and Agbagno with Togo.) Round 4	ASO Chlef	1–1	USM Khenchela	Chlef
16:00	Bourdim 31' (pen.)		Bakir 53'	Stadium: Mohamed Boumezrag Stadium; Referee: Bilel Soltani; VAR: Mustapha Ghorbal

26 October 2024 Round 6	JS Kabylie	1–0	USM Khenchela	Tizi Ouzou
17:30	Bwalya 28'	Report		Stadium: Hocine Aït Ahmed Stadium; Referee: Anes Azrine; VAR: Lahlou Benbraham

2 November 2024 Round 7	USM Khenchela	1–0	NC Magra	Khenchela
15:00	Boumechra 33'	Report		Stadium: Amar Hamam Stadium; Referee: Nabil Boukhalfa

8 November 2024 Round 8	Paradou AC	4–0	USM Khenchela	Algiers
16:45	Salem 26'; Kohili 42', 68'; Boulbina 80'	Report		Stadium: Stade du 5 Juillet; Referee: Yahia Dehar; VAR: Houssam Benyahia

15 November 2024 Round 9	USM Khenchela	1–0	CS Constantine	Khenchela
15:00	Boumechra 90+2'	Report		Stadium: Amar Hamam Stadium; Referee: Abdelali Ibrir

22 November 2024 Round 10	MC Oran	0–0	USM Khenchela	Bir El Djir
17:45		Report		Stadium: Miloud Hadefi Stadium; Referee: Lahlou Benbraham; VAR: Mehdi Oukil

30 November 2024 Round 11	USM Khenchela	1–0	Olympique Akbou	Khenchela
15:00	Djaouchi 67'	Report		Stadium: Amar Hamam Stadium; Referee: Youcef Taieb Bouderbal

7 December 2024 Round 12	USM Khenchela	2–3	ES Sétif	Khenchela
15:00	Aiboud 45+1'; Djaouchi 84'	Report	Boubekeur 55'; Chaabi 77'; Gattal 90+2'	Stadium: Amar Hamam Stadium; Referee: Houssam Benyahia

21 December 2024 Round 14	USM Khenchela	0–0	US Biskra	Khenchela
15:00		Report		Stadium: Amar Hamam Stadium; Referee: Redouane Allou

28 December 2024 Round 15	MC El Bayadh	1–2	USM Khenchela	El Bayadh
15:00	Belaribi 50'	Report	Sameur 45'; Saâdou 52'	Stadium: Zakaria Medjdoub Stadium; Attendance: 0 (close doors); Referee: Mohamed Boutaraa

5 February 2025 Round 13	USM Alger	3–0	USM Khenchela	Baraki
17:00	Belkacemi 34' (pen.); Ghacha 71', 79'	Report		Stadium: Nelson Mandela Stadium; Attendance: 0 (close doors); Referee: Tahar Boudjemaa; VAR: Nabil Boukhalfa

12 February 2025 Round 16	CR Belouizdad	3–0	USM Khenchela	Baraki
19:00	Mayo 28'; Hamroune 51'; Boukerchaoui 87'	Report		Stadium: Nelson Mandela Stadium; Referee: Rafik Aouina; VAR: Nabil Boukhalfa

18 February 2025 Round 17	USM Khenchela	1–3	JS Saoura	Khenchela
15:30	Djaouchi 45+3'	Report	Bedi 40'; Bentaleb 76', 90+3'	Stadium: Amar Hamam Stadium; Attendance: 0 (close doors); Referee: Youcef Gamouh

25 February 2025 Round 18	ES Mostaganem	2–0	USM Khenchela	Mostaganem
18:00	Aoudjane 21'; Siam 34'	Report		Stadium: Mohamed Bensaïd Stadium; Attendance: 0 (close doors); Referee: Lahlou Benbraham; VAR: Tahar Boudjemaa

7 March 2025 Round 19	USM Khenchela	3–2	ASO Chlef	Khenchela
15:00	Ibara 17'; Guemroud 73'; Bakir 90+1'	Report	Sadahine 30'; Agbagno 66'	Stadium: Amar Hamam Stadium; Referee: Anes Azrine

15 March 2025 Round 20	MC Alger	2–2	USM Khenchela	Algiers
22:00	Menezla 55'; Bangoura 75'	Report	Djaouchi 83' (pen.), 90+2'	Stadium: Stade du 5 Juillet; Referee: Alaa Bouab; VAR: Akram Mechairia

4 April 2025 Round 21	USM Khenchela	0–1	JS Kabylie	Khenchela
16:00		Report	Berkane 90+2'	Stadium: Amar Hamam Stadium; Referee: Rafik Aouina

12 April 2025 Round 22	NC Magra	2–0	USM Khenchela	Magra
16:00	Djabout 40', 53'	Report		Stadium: Boucheligue Brothers Stadium; Referee: Houssam Benyahia

18 April 2025 Round 23	USM Khenchela	2–2	Paradou AC	Khenchela
16:00	Boumechra 29'; Djaouchi 38'	Report	Dao 2'; Ferrahi 90+6'	Stadium: Amar Hamam Stadium; Referee: Fateh Harkat

10 May 2025 Round 25	USM Khenchela	2–1	MC Oran	Khenchela
16:00	Oukil 4'; Djaouchi 40' (pen.)	Report	Goudjil 33'	Stadium: Amar Hamam Stadium; Attendance: 0 (close doors); Referee: Hamza Bouslimani

16 May 2025 Round 26	Olympique Akbou	2–1	USM Khenchela	Béjaïa
16:30	Ouassa 24'; Addadi 75' (pen.)	Report	Djaouchi 88'	Stadium: Maghrebi Unity Stadium; Referee: Youcef Taieb Bouderbal; VAR: Abderahmane Sahraoui

25 May 2025 Round 27	ES Sétif	0–1	USM Khenchela	Sétif
17:00		Report	Oukil 6'	Stadium: 8 May 1945 Stadium; Referee: Mustapha Ghorbal; VAR: Anes Azrine

3 June 2025 Round 24	CS Constantine	2–1	USM Khenchela	Constantine
17:00	Temine 37'; Rebiaï 51'	Report	Boumechra 23'	Stadium: Ramadane Ben Abdelmalek Stadium; Referee: Abdelali Ibrir

11 June 2025 Round 28	USM Khenchela	1–0	USM Alger	Khenchela
17:00	Djaouchi 80'	Report		Stadium: Amar Hamam Stadium; Attendance: 0 (close doors); Referee: Tayeb Benyabka

17 June 2025 Round 29	US Biskra	1–2	USM Khenchela	Biskra
17:30	Bouda 83'	Report	Boumechra 63'; Djaouchi 75'	Stadium: 18 February Stadium; Referee: Lotfi Bekouassa

20 June 2025 Round 30	USM Khenchela	1–0	MC El Bayadh	Khenchela
17:00	Bougoursa 78'	Report		Stadium: Amar Hamam Stadium; Referee: Zouhir Maansri

=== Algerian Cup ===
2 January 2025 Round of 64	JS Saoura	2–1 (a.e.t.)	USM Khenchela	Béchar
15:00	Bentaleb 97'; Taib 114'	Report	Bakir 118'	Stadium: 20 August 1955 Stadium; Referee: Hamlat.S

== Squad information ==
=== Appearances and goals ===
As of 20 June 2025

No.	Pos	Player	Nat	Ligue 1			Algerian Cup			Total		
No.	Pos	Player	Nat	App	St	G	App	St	G	App	St	G
Goalkeepers
1	GK	Sofiane Khedairia	(Algeria)	8	7	0	0	0	0	8	7	0
16	GK	Oussama Litim	(Algeria)	23	23	0	1	1	0	24	24	0
Defenders
2	RB	Aymen Chaaraoui	(Algeria)	10	7	0	1	1	0	11	8	0
5	CB	Nabil Saâdou	(Algeria)	19	18	1	0	0	0	19	18	1
12	LB	Oussama Kaddour	(Algeria)	30	30	1	1	1	0	31	31	1
21	CB	Hamza Rebiai	(Algeria)	17	16	0	1	1	0	18	17	0
22	RB	Mohamed Guemroud	(Algeria)	28	28	1	0	0	0	29	29	1
25	CB	Abdelhafid Hoggas	(Algeria)	14	6	0	1	1	0	15	7	0
33	CB	Zin Eddine Meddour	(Algeria)	4	2	0	0	0	0	4	2	0
Midfielders
6	DM	Ahmida Zenasni	(Algeria)	28	22	0	1	1	0	29	23	0
8	DM	Abdelhakim Sameur	(Algeria)	24	23	1	1	1	0	25	24	0
11	CM	Mohamed Islam Bakir	(Algeria)	22	20	4	1	1	1	23	21	5
14	DM	Christopher Ngolo	(Democratic Republic of the Congo)	13	8	0	0	0	0	13	8	0
15	DM	Badreddine Touki	(Algeria)	24	14	0	1	1	0	25	15	0
20	CM	Samir Aiboud	(Algeria)	20	14	1	0	0	0	20	14	1
24	CM	Zakaria Saidi	(Algeria)	7	1	0	1	0	0	8	1	0
26	AM	Mohamed Reda Boumechra	(Algeria)	22	18	5	0	0	0	22	18	5
42	CM	Mohamed Touati	(Algeria)	5	0	0	0	0	0	5	0	0
44	CM	Oussama Sid	(Algeria)	2	0	0	0	0	0	2	0	0
Forwards
7	LW	Chouaib Debbih	(Algeria)	27	18	0	0	0	0	27	18	0
9	ST	William Matam	(Cameroon)	2	1	0	0	0	0	2	1	0
10	RW	Ammar Oukil	(Algeria)	15	12	2	0	0	0	15	12	2
19	ST	Prince Ibara	(Republic of the Congo)	7	2	1	0	0	0	7	2	1
27	ST	Hamid Djaouchi	(Algeria)	19	14	9	1	1	0	20	15	9
47	ST	Wassim Bougoursa	(Algeria)	10	1	1	1	1	0	11	2	1
Players transferred out during the season
~~3~~	LB	Moise Gbai	(Ivory Coast)	0	0	0	0	0	0	0	0	0
~~4~~	CB	Ibrahim Hachoud	(Algeria)	11	11	0	0	0	0	11	11	0
~~23~~	CB	Irenée Glele	(Benin)	0	0	0	0	0	0	0	0	0
~~17~~	CM	Khaled Nèche	(Algeria)	12	4	1	1	0	0	13	4	1
~~9~~	RW	Ilyes Yaiche	(Algeria)	10	4	0	0	0	0	10	4	0
~~15~~	RW	Dago Tshibamba	(Democratic Republic of the Congo)	13	8	0	0	0	0	13	8	0
Total				30		28	1		1	31		29

Last updated: 20 June 2025
Source: [ Soccerway.com]

=== Goalscorers ===
As of 20 June 2025

Includes all competitive matches.

No.	Nat.	Player	Pos.	L1	AC	TOTAL
27	(Algeria)	Hamid Djaouchi	ST	9	0	9
26	(Algeria)	Mohamed Reda Boumechra	AM	5	0	5
11	(Algeria)	Mohamed Islam Bakir	CM	4	1	5
10	(Algeria)	Ammar Oukil	RW	2	0	2
5	(Algeria)	Nabil Saâdou	CB	1	0	1
12	(Algeria)	Oussama Kaddour	LB	1	0	1
22	(Algeria)	Mohamed Guemroud	RB	1	0	1
8	(Algeria)	Abdelhakim Sameur	DM	1	0	1
20	(Algeria)	Samir Aiboud	CM	1	0	1
47	(Algeria)	Wassim Bougoursa	ST	1	0	1
19	(Republic of the Congo)	Prince Ibara	ST	1	0	1
17	(Algeria)	Khaled Nèche	ST	1	0	1
Own Goals				0	0	0
Totals				28	1	29

=== Clean sheets ===
As of 20 June 2025

Includes all competitive matches.

					Clean sheets		
No.	Nat	Name	GP	GA	L 1	AC	Total
1	(Algeria)	Sofiane Khedairia	8	11	2	0	2
16	(Algeria)	Oussama Litim	24	28	7	0	7
		TOTALS		39	9	0	9
