= 2026–27 USM Khenchela season =

USM Khenchela
2025–26 season
- Owner: Algérie Télécom
- President: Walid Boukrouma
- Head coach: Billel Dziri (until 19 September 2026); Mohamed Djebaili (c) (from 19 September 2026)
- Stadium: Amar Hamam Stadium
- Ligue 1: 15th
- Algerian Cup: Round of 64

The 2026–27 season, is USM Khenchela's 7th season and the club's 5th consecutive season in the top flight of Algerian football. In addition to the domestic league, USM Khenchela are participating in this season's editions of the Algerian Cup.

== Squad list ==
Players and squad numbers last updated on 31 August 2026.
Note: Flags indicate national team as has been defined under FIFA eligibility rules. Players may hold more than one non-FIFA nationality.

| No. | Nat. | Name | Position | Date of Birth (Age) | Signed from |
Goalkeepers
| 1 | (Algeria) | Hatem Bencheikh El Fegoun | GK | 3 November 1999 (aged 26) | (Algeria) Olympique Akbou |
| 16 | (Algeria) | Oussama Litim | GK | 3 June 1990 (aged 36) | (Algeria) MC Alger |
| 30 | (Algeria) | Yasser Zitouni | GK | 3 April 2005 (aged 21) | (Algeria) USM Alger |
Defenders
| 3 | (Algeria) | Nabil Lamara | LB | 15 August 1993 (aged 33) | Unattached |
| 4 | (Algeria) | Imadeddine Boubekeur | CB | 10 July 1995 (aged 31) | (Algeria) ES Sétif |
| 5 | (Algeria) | Youcef Douar | CB | 15 September 1997 (aged 27) | (Algeria) ES Sétif |
| 12 | (Algeria) | Zineddine Meddour | CB | 7 February 2004 (aged 22) | (Algeria) Reserve team |
| 18 | (Algeria) | Anouar Boukhalfa | LB | 28 February 1998 (aged 28) | (Algeria) MO Béjaïa |
| 19 | (Algeria) | Abdelhamid Dris | CB | 12 February 2002 (aged 24) | (Algeria) JS Kabylie |
| 21 | (Algeria) | Ibrahim Hachoud | CB | 5 March 2000 (aged 26) | (Algeria) MC Oran |
| 27 | (Algeria) | Zakaria Zaitri | RB | 18 July 1998 (aged 28) | (Algeria) US Biskra |
Midfielders
| 6 | (Algeria) | Ahmida Zenasni | DM | 10 July 1993 (aged 33) | (Algeria) ASO Chlef |
| 8 | (Algeria) | Abdelhakim Sameur | DM | 12 November 1990 (aged 35) | (Algeria) US Biskra |
| 10 | (Algeria) | Mehdi Boukassi | AM | 17 June 1996 (aged 29) | (Czech Republic) SFC Opava |
| 11 | (Algeria) | Adem Chaibi | AM | 11 October 2000 (aged 24) | (Algeria) CA Batna |
| 14 | (Ivory Coast) | Issouf Kamara | CM | 20 March 2003 (aged 23) | (Ivory Coast) ASEC Mimosas |
| 17 | (Algeria) | Sid Ahmed Matallah | DM | 14 January 1996 (aged 30) | (Algeria) JS Saoura |
| 22 | (Algeria) | Necer Benzid | CM | 20 February 2001 (aged 25) | (Algeria) CR Belouizdad |
| 24 | (Nigeria) | Ayobami Junior | CM | 24 December 1998 (aged 27) | (Nigeria) Shooting Stars |
| 25 | (Algeria) | Aymen Bendaoud | DM | 18 June 2001 (aged 25) | (Algeria) JS Kabylie |
Forwards
| 7 | (Algeria) | Abdelhak Askar | LW | 15 December 1997 (aged 28) | (Algeria) ES Mostaganem |
| 9 | (Senegal) | Almamy Fall | ST | 4 April 2003 (aged 23) | (Senegal) ASC Jaraaf |
| 15 | (Algeria) | Massinissa Nezla | ST | 12 September 1998 (aged 26) | (Algeria) JS Kabylie |
| 23 | (Algeria) | Faik Amrane | LW | 26 November 1997 (aged 28) | (Algeria) MB Rouissat |
| 29 | (Guinea) | Alhassane Camara | RW | 1 August 2005 (aged 21) | (Guinea) Hafia FC |

== Transfers ==
=== In ===
==== Summer ====
| Date | Pos | Player | Moving from | Fee | Source |
|---|---|---|---|---|---|
| 20 July 2026 | GK | (Algeria) Hatem Bencheikh El Fegoun | Olympique Akbou | Free transfer | |
| 20 July 2026 | CM | (Algeria) Necer Benzid | CR Belouizdad | Free transfer | |
| 20 July 2026 | CB | (Algeria) Youcef Douar | ES Sétif | Free transfer | |
| 20 July 2026 | DM | (Algeria) Sid Ahmed Matallah | JS Saoura | Free transfer | |
| 20 July 2026 | AM | (Algeria) Adem Chaibi | CA Batna | Free transfer | |
| 20 July 2026 | CB | (Algeria) Imadeddine Boubekeur | ES Sétif | Free transfer | |
| 20 July 2026 | LW | (Algeria) Faik Amrane | MB Rouissat | Free transfer | |
| 20 July 2026 | RW | (Guinea) Alhassane Camara | (Guinea) Hafia FC | Free transfer | |
| 20 July 2026 | LB | (Algeria) Anouar Boukhalfa | ES Sétif | Free transfer | |
| 20 July 2026 | CM | (Ivory Coast) Kamara Issouf | (Ivory Coast) ASEC Mimosas | Free transfer | |
| 22 July 2026 | CB | (Algeria) Ibrahim Hachoud | MC Oran | Free transfer | |
| 25 July 2026 | CM | (Nigeria) Ayobami Junior | (Nigeria) Shooting Stars | Free transfer | |
| 3 August 2026 | ST | (Senegal) Almamy Fall | (Senegal) ASC Jaraaf | Free transfer | |
| 23 August 2026 | RB | (Algeria) Zakaria Zaitri | US Biskra | Free transfer | |
| 23 August 2026 | AM | (Algeria) Mehdi Boukassi | (Czech Republic) SFC Opava | Free transfer | |

=== Out ===
==== Summer ====
| Date | Pos | Player | Moving to | Fee | Source |
|---|---|---|---|---|---|
| 15 June 2026 | AM | (Algeria) Mohamed Reda Boumechra | ES Sétif | Free transfer | |
| 30 June 2026 | ST | (Gabon) Edlin Essang-Matouti | MC Oran | Free transfer | |
| 7 July 2026 | CM | (Algeria) Mohamed Islam Bakir | CS Constantine | Free transfer | |
| 7 July 2026 | ST | (Algeria) Hamid Djaouchi | CS Constantine | Free transfer | |
| 9 July 2026 | GK | (Algeria) Abdelkader Morcely | CR Témouchent | Free transfer | |
| 9 July 2026 | CB | (Ivory Coast) Serge Badjo | (Tanzania) Simba SC | Free transfer | |
| 10 July 2026 | ST | (Cameroon) Franck Etouga | CR Belouizdad | Free transfer | |
| 14 July 2026 | CM | (Algeria) Hadji Chekal Affari | CS Constantine | Free transfer | |
| 16 July 2026 | RB | (Algeria) Mohamed Guemroud | JS El Biar | Free transfer | |
| 16 July 2026 | RW | (Algeria) Ammar Oukil | JS El Biar | Free transfer | |
| 17 July 2026 | ST | (Algeria) Adem Aichouche | US Chaouia | Free transfer | |
| 2 August 2026 | ST | (Algeria) Ayoub Kabouche | MO Béjaïa | Free transfer | |

=== New contracts ===
| No. | Pos | Player | Contract length | Contract end | Date | Source |
|---|---|---|---|---|---|---|
| 16 | GK | Oussama Litim | 2 years | 2028 | 23 May 2026 | |

== Competitions ==
=== Overview ===
| Competition | Record | | | | | | | | Started round | Final position / round | First match | Last match |
| Competition | G | W | D | L | GF | GA | GD | Win % | Started round | Final position / round | First match | Last match |
|---|---|---|---|---|---|---|---|---|---|---|---|---|
| Ligue 1 | 10 | 1 | 4 | 5 | 5 | 12 | −7 | 10.00 | —N/a | To be confirmed | 4 September 2026 | In Progress |
| Algerian Cup | 0 | 0 | 0 | 0 | 0 | 0 | +0 | — | Round of 64 | To be confirmed | In Progress | In Progress |
| Total | 10 | 1 | 4 | 5 | 5 | 12 | −7 | 10.00 | | | | |

Updated to match played 20 November 2026
Source: Competitions

=== Ligue 1 ===
==== League table ====
| Pos | Team | Pld | W | D | L | GF | GA | GD | Pts | Qualification or relegation |
|---|---|---|---|---|---|---|---|---|---|---|
| 12 | ES Ben Aknoun | 9 | 1 | 5 | 3 | 8 | 10 | −2 | 8 | |
| 13 | ASO Chlef | 10 | 1 | 5 | 4 | 9 | 13 | −4 | 8 | |
| 14 | JS Saoura | 9 | 1 | 4 | 4 | 2 | 8 | −6 | 7 | Relegation to Algerian League 2 |
| 15 | USM Khenchela | 10 | 1 | 4 | 5 | 5 | 12 | −7 | 7 | Relegation to Algerian League 2 |
| 16 | US Biskra | 10 | 0 | 5 | 5 | 5 | 15 | −10 | 5 | Relegation to Algerian League 2 |

Updated to match(es) played on 20 November 2026. Source: lfp.dz
Rules for classification: 1) Points; 2) Head-to-head points; 3) Head-to-head goal difference; 4) First half goal difference; 5) First half total goals; 6) Fairplay ranking; 7) Playoff.

==== Results summary ====
| Overall | | | | | | | | Home | | | | | | Away | | | | | |
| Pld | W | D | L | GF | GA | GD | Pts | W | D | L | GF | GA | GD | W | D | L | GF | GA | GD |
|---|---|---|---|---|---|---|---|---|---|---|---|---|---|---|---|---|---|---|---|
| 10 | 1 | 4 | 5 | 5 | 12 | −7 | 7 | 1 | 3 | 1 | 4 | 5 | −1 | 0 | 1 | 4 | 1 | 7 | −6 |

Last updated: 20 November 2026.
Source: Competitive matches

==== Results by round ====
| Round | 1 | 2 | 3 | 4 | 5 | 6 | 7 | 8 | 9 | 10 | 11 | 12 | 13 | 14 | 15 | 16 | 17 | 18 | 19 | 20 | 21 | 22 | 23 | 24 | 25 | 26 | 27 | 28 | 29 | 30 |
|---|---|---|---|---|---|---|---|---|---|---|---|---|---|---|---|---|---|---|---|---|---|---|---|---|---|---|---|---|---|---|
| Ground | H | A | H | A | H | A | H | A | H | A | H | A | H | H | A | A | H | A | H | A | H | A | H | A | H | A | H | A | A | H |
| Result | D | D | D | L | W | L | L | L | D | L | | | | | | | | | | | | | | | | | | | | |
| Position | 12 | | | | | | | | | | | | | | | | | | | | | | | | | | | | | |

Updated to match(es) played on 20 November 2026. Source: Competitive matches
A = Away; H = Home; W = Win; D = Draw; L = Loss

==== Matches ====
The league fixtures were announced on 3 August 2026.

All times are local, WAT (UTC+1).

Win Draw Loss Postponed

| 4 September 2026 Round 1 | USM Khenchela | 0–0 | USM Alger | Khenchela |
| 17:00 | | Flashscore; LFP | | Stadium: Amar Hamam Stadium; Referee: Abdelali Ibrir |

| 18 September 2026 Round 3 | USM Khenchela | 1–1 | ES Ben Aknoun | Khenchela |
| 16:00 | Benzid 62' | Flashscore; LFP | Benchaira 84' | Stadium: Amar Hamam Stadium; Referee: Rafiq Aouina |

| 7 October 2026 Round 4 | CR Belouizdad | 1–0 | USM Khenchela | Algiers |
| 20:00 | Benayada 90+7' (pen.) | Flashscore; LFP | | Stadium: Stade du 5 Juillet; Referee: Tayeb Benyabka |

| 12 October 2026 Round 5 | USM Khenchela | – | CS Constantine | Khenchela |
| 15:00 | Fall 44'; Benzid 56' | Flashscore; LFP | | Stadium: Amar Hamam Stadium; Referee: Alaa Bouab |

| 17 October 2026 Round 6 | MC Oran | 1–0 | USM Khenchela | Bir El Djir |
| 19:00 | Mouley 64' | Flashscore; LFP | | Stadium: Miloud Hadefi Stadium; Referee: Abderahmane Mohamed Belkebir |

| 24 October 2026 Round 7 | USM Khenchela | 0–3 | JS Kabylie | Khenchela |
| 15:00 | | Flashscore; LFP | Bouamama 48'; Hamidi 54'; Messaoudi 64' | Stadium: Amar Hamam Stadium; Referee: Ayoub Belhachemi |

| 31 October 2026 Round 8 | MC Alger | 2–0 | USM Khenchela | Douéra |
| 15:00 | Ghezala 2'; Bayazid 68' | Flashscore; LFP | | Stadium: Ali La Pointe Stadium; Referee: Nabil Boukhalfa |

| 8 November 2026 Round 9 | USM Khenchela | 1–1 | CR Témouchent | Khenchela |
| 14:00 | Askar 90' | Flashscore; LFP | Itim 60' | Stadium: Amar Hamam Stadium; Referee: Youcef Abane |

| 13 November 2026 Round 2 | JS Saoura | 1–1 | USM Khenchela | Béchar |
| 18:00 | Allaoui 9' | Flashscore; LFP | Mebarki 45+2' (o.g.) | Stadium: 20 August 1955 Stadium; Referee: Mustapha Smaïl |

| 20 November 2026 Round 10 | ASO Chlef | 2–0 | USM Khenchela | Chlef |
| 17:00 | Feddal 75'; Debbari 88' | Flashscore; LFP | | Stadium: Mohamed Boumezrag Stadium; Referee: Hichem Benokba |

| 30 November 2026 Round 11 | USM Khenchela | – | ES Sétif | Khenchela |
| 14:00 | | Flashscore; LFP | | Stadium: Amar Hamam Stadium |

| Round 12 | US Biskra | – | USM Khenchela | Zeribet El Oued |
| : | | Flashscore; LFP | | Stadium: Bouhafs Chabi Stadium |

| Round 13 | USM Khenchela | – | MB Rouissat | Khenchela |
| : | | Flashscore; LFP | | Stadium: Amar Hamam Stadium |

| Round 14 | USM Khenchela | – | JS El Biar | Khenchela |
| : | | Flashscore; LFP | | Stadium: Amar Hamam Stadium |

| Round 15 | Olympique Akbou | – | USM Khenchela | Akbou |
| : | | Flashscore; LFP | | Stadium: Martyrs Stadium |

| Round 16 | USM Alger | – | USM Khenchela | Algiers |
| : | | Flashscore; LFP | | Stadium: Stade du 5 Juillet |

| Round 17 | USM Khenchela | – | JS Saoura | Khenchela |
| : | | Flashscore; LFP | | Stadium: Amar Hamam Stadium |

| Round 18 | ES Ben Aknoun | – | USM Khenchela | Belouizdad |
| : | | Flashscore; LFP | | Stadium: 20 August 1955 Stadium |

| Round 19 | USM Khenchela | – | CR Belouizdad | Khenchela |
| : | | Flashscore; LFP | | Stadium: Amar Hamam Stadium |

| Round 20 | CS Constantine | – | USM Khenchela | Constantine |
| : | | Flashscore; LFP | | Stadium: Chahid Hamlaoui Stadium |

| Round 21 | USM Khenchela | – | MC Oran | Khenchela |
| : | | Flashscore; LFP | | Stadium: Amar Hamam Stadium |

| Round 22 | JS Kabylie | – | USM Khenchela | Tizi Ouzou |
| : | | Flashscore; LFP | | Stadium: Hocine Aït Ahmed Stadium |

| Round 23 | USM Khenchela | – | MC Alger | Khenchela |
| : | | Flashscore; LFP | | Stadium: Amar Hamam Stadium |

| Round 24 | CR Témouchent | – | USM Khenchela | Aïn Témouchent |
| : | | Flashscore; LFP | | Stadium: Omar Oucief Stadium |

| Round 25 | USM Khenchela | – | ASO Chlef | Khenchela |
| : | | Flashscore; LFP | | Stadium: Amar Hamam Stadium |

| Round 26 | ES Sétif | – | USM Khenchela | Sétif |
| : | | Flashscore; LFP | | Stadium: 8 May 1945 Stadium |

| Round 27 | USM Khenchela | – | US Biskra | Khenchela |
| : | | Flashscore; LFP | | Stadium: Amar Hamam Stadium |

| Round 28 | MB Rouissat | – | USM Khenchela | Ouargla |
| : | | Flashscore; LFP | | Stadium: 18 February Stadium |

| Round 29 | JS El Biar | – | USM Khenchela | Blida |
| : | | Flashscore; LFP | | Stadium: Mustapha Tchaker Stadium |

| Round 30 | USM Khenchela | – | Olympique Akbou | Khenchela |
| : | | Flashscore; LFP | | Stadium: Amar Hamam Stadium |

=== Algerian Cup ===
| December 2026 Round of 64 | – |
| : |

== Squad information ==
=== Appearances and goals ===
As of 20 November 2026

| No. | Pos | Player | Nat | Ligue 1 | | | Algerian Cup | | | Total | | |
| No. | Pos | Player | Nat | App | St | G | App | St | G | App | St | G |
|---|---|---|---|---|---|---|---|---|---|---|---|---|
Goalkeepers
| 1 | GK | Hatem Bencheikh El Fegoun | (Algeria) | 0 | 0 | 0 | 0 | 0 | 0 | 0 | 0 | 0 |
| 16 | GK | Oussama Litim | (Algeria) | 10 | 10 | 0 | 0 | 0 | 0 | 0 | 0 | 0 |
| 30 | GK | Yasser Zitouni | (Algeria) | 0 | 0 | 0 | 0 | 0 | 0 | 0 | 0 | 0 |
Defenders
| 3 | LB | Nabil Lamara | (Algeria) | 1 | 1 | 0 | 0 | 0 | 0 | 0 | 0 | 0 |
| 4 | CB | Imadeddine Boubekeur | (Algeria) | 10 | 10 | 0 | 0 | 0 | 0 | 0 | 0 | 0 |
| 5 | CB | Youcef Douar | (Algeria) | 4 | 2 | 0 | 0 | 0 | 0 | 0 | 0 | 0 |
| 12 | CB | Zineddine Meddour | (Algeria) | 4 | 0 | 0 | 0 | 0 | 0 | 0 | 0 | 0 |
| 18 | LB | Anouar Boukhalfa | (Algeria) | 4 | 3 | 0 | 0 | 0 | 0 | 0 | 0 | 0 |
| 19 | CB | Abdelhamid Dris | (Algeria) | 9 | 9 | 0 | 0 | 0 | 0 | 0 | 0 | 0 |
| 21 | CB | Ibrahim Hachoud | (Algeria) | 7 | 4 | 0 | 0 | 0 | 0 | 0 | 0 | 0 |
| 27 | RB | Zakaria Zaitri | (Algeria) | 8 | 8 | 0 | 0 | 0 | 0 | 0 | 0 | 0 |
Midfielders
| 6 | DM | Ahmida Zenasni | (Algeria) | 10 | 10 | 0 | 0 | 0 | 0 | 0 | 0 | 0 |
| 8 | DM | Abdelhakim Sameur | (Algeria) | 3 | 0 | 0 | 0 | 0 | 0 | 0 | 0 | 0 |
| 10 | AM | Mehdi Boukassi | (Algeria) | 0 | 0 | 0 | 0 | 0 | 0 | 0 | 0 | 0 |
| 11 | AM | Adem Chaibi | (Algeria) | 9 | 5 | 0 | 0 | 0 | 0 | 0 | 0 | 0 |
| 14 | CM | Issouf Kamara | (Ivory Coast) | 10 | 10 | 0 | 0 | 0 | 0 | 0 | 0 | 0 |
| 17 | DM | Sid Ahmed Matallah | (Algeria) | 7 | 0 | 0 | 0 | 0 | 0 | 0 | 0 | 0 |
| 22 | CM | Necer Benzid | (Algeria) | 8 | 8 | 2 | 0 | 0 | 0 | 0 | 0 | 0 |
| 24 | CM | Ayobami Junior | (Nigeria) | 1 | 0 | 0 | 0 | 0 | 0 | 0 | 0 | 0 |
| 25 | DM | Aymen Bendaoud | (Algeria) | 2 | 0 | 0 | 0 | 0 | 0 | 0 | 0 | 0 |
| 41 | AM | Redha Benmahdi | (Algeria) | 2 | 0 | 0 | 0 | 0 | 0 | 0 | 0 | 0 |
Forwards
| 7 | LW | Abdelhak Askar | (Algeria) | 8 | 7 | 1 | 0 | 0 | 0 | 0 | 0 | 0 |
| 9 | ST | Almamy Fall | (Senegal) | 10 | 8 | 1 | 0 | 0 | 0 | 0 | 0 | 0 |
| 15 | ST | Massinissa Nezla | (Algeria) | 8 | 3 | 0 | 0 | 0 | 0 | 0 | 0 | 0 |
| 23 | LW | Faik Amrane | (Algeria) | 9 | 3 | 0 | 0 | 0 | 0 | 0 | 0 | 0 |
| 29 | RW | Alhassane Camara | (Guinea) | 10 | 9 | 0 | 0 | 0 | 0 | 0 | 0 | 0 |
| Total | | | | 10 | | 5 | 0 | | 0 | 0 | | 0 |

Last updated: 20 November 2026
Source: soccerway.com

=== Goalscorers ===
As of 20 November 2026

Includes all competitive matches.

| No. | Nat. | Player | Pos. | L1 | AC | TOTAL |
|---|---|---|---|---|---|---|
| 22 | (Algeria) | Necer Benzid | CM | 2 | 0 | 2 |
| 9 | (Senegal) | Almamy Fall | ST | 1 | 0 | 1 |
| 7 | (Algeria) | Abdelhak Askar | LW | 1 | 0 | 1 |
| Own Goals | | | | 1 | 0 | 1 |
| Totals | | | | 5 | 0 | 5 |

=== Clean sheets ===
As of 20 November 2026

Includes all competitive matches.

| | | | | | Clean sheets | | |
| No. | Nat | Name | GP | GA | L1 | AC | Total |
|---|---|---|---|---|---|---|---|
| 1 | (Algeria) | Hatem Bencheikh El Fegoun | 0 | 0 | 0 | 0 | 0 |
| 16 | (Algeria) | Oussama Litim | 10 | 12 | 2 | 0 | 2 |
| 30 | (Algeria) | Yasser Zitouni | 0 | 0 | 0 | 0 | 0 |
| | | TOTALS | | 12 | 2 | 0 | 2 |
