= 2022–23 USM Khenchela season =

USM Khenchela
2022–23 season
- President: Walid Boukrouma
- Head coach: Nabil Neghiz (from 28 July 2022)
- Stadium: Amar Hamam Stadium
- Ligue 1: 8th
- Algerian Cup: Round of 16
- Top goalscorer: League: Sofiane Bayazid (12 goals); All: Sofiane Bayazid (14 goals)
- Biggest win: USM Khenchela 4–0 CR Belouizdad; USM Khenchela 4–0 IRB Maghnia
- Biggest defeat: RC Arbaâ 5–1 USM Khenchela
Home colours	Away colours

The 2022–23 season, was USM Khenchela's 3rd season in the top flight of Algerian football. In addition to the domestic league, USM Khenchela participated in the Algerian Cup. On May 21, 2022, USM Khenchela were promoted to the Algerian Ligue Professionnelle 1 returns to the national elite that it left almost 50 years ago. The Ciskaoua will thus once again taste the sensations of the Ligue 1 where they had played for two seasons at the beginning of the 1970s. On February 2, 2023, an agreement was signed between Groupe Cosider and USM Khenchela, under this agreement which covers a renewable year, the club will benefit from financial support during the 2022–23 sports season. This agreement initialed in the presence of the Wali of Khenchela, aims underlined the CEO of Cosider to support the evolution of the club through a sponsorship formula, under which Groupe Cosider will financially support all of the activities of USM Khenchela.

== Squad list ==
Players and squad numbers last updated on 5 February 2023.
Note: Flags indicate national team as has been defined under FIFA eligibility rules. Players may hold more than one non-FIFA nationality.

No.	Nat.	Position	Name	Date of birth (age)	Signed from
Goalkeepers
1	(Algeria)	GK	Oussama Filali	24 July 1998 (aged 24)	(Algeria) US Chaouia
16	(Algeria)	GK	Abdelhamid Brahimi	27 May 1992 (aged 30)	(Algeria) RC Kouba
Defenders
2	(Algeria)	CB	Anes Saad	18 January 1996 (aged 26)	(Algeria) CR Ben Badis
5	(Algeria)	CB	Nabil Saâdou	7 March 1990 (aged 32)	(Saudi Arabia) Al-Jabalain FC
12	(Algeria)	LB	Oussama Kaddour	12 May 1997 (aged 25)	(Algeria) Olympique de Médéa
15	(Algeria)	LB	Abdelhalim Ameur	30 October 1989 (aged 33)	(Algeria)
21	(Algeria)	RB	Aymen Attou	8 October 1997 (aged 25)	(Algeria) MC Alger
22	(Algeria)	CB	Mohamed Achref Aib	24 May 1990 (aged 32)	(Algeria) HB Chelghoum Laïd
25	(Algeria)	CB	Abdelhafid Hoggas	1 January 1992 (aged 31)	(Algeria) MO Constantine
26	(Algeria)	RB	Abdellah Meddah	8 March 1999 (aged 23)	(Algeria) ASO Chlef
Midfielders
8	(Algeria)	MF	Abdelhakim Sameur	12 November 1990 (aged 32)	(Algeria) US Biskra
10	(Algeria)	MF	Mohamed Yacine Athmani	13 May 1991 (aged 31)	(Algeria) US Biskra
14	(Algeria)	MF	Foued Hadded	1 November 1990 (aged 32)	(Algeria) HB Chelghoum Laïd
18	(Algeria)	MF	Hamza Ziad	29 February 1988 (aged 34)	(Algeria) AS Ain M'lila
27	(Algeria)	MF	Sid Ali Lamri	3 February 1991 (aged 31)	(Algeria) HB Chelghoum Laïd
Forwards
7	(Algeria)	FW	Sofiane Bayazid	16 November 1996 (aged 26)	(Algeria) AS Khroub
9	(Algeria)	FW	Ilyes Yaiche	27 October 1997 (aged 25)	(Kuwait) Qadsia SC
11	(Algeria)	FW	Hamza Zaidi	9 November 1990 (aged 32)	(Algeria) MC Alger
13	(Algeria)	FW	Mohamed Amine Semahi	22 June 1999 (aged 23)	(Algeria) WA Tlemcen
17	(Algeria)	FW	Abderrahmane Bacha	21 December 1999 (aged 23)	(Algeria) USM Alger
19	(Ghana)	FW	Maxwell Baakoh	8 October 1995 (aged 27)	(Jordan) Sahab SC
20	(Nigeria)	FW	Tosin Omoyele	3 August 1996 (aged 26)	(Nigeria) Enyimba

== Transfers ==
=== In ===
==== Summer ====
Date	Pos	Player	From club	Transfer fee	Source
2 August 2022	DF	(Algeria) Aymen Attou	MC Alger	Free transfer	
2 August 2022	FW	(Algeria) Hamza Zaidi	MC Alger	Free transfer	
2 August 2022	MF	(Algeria) Abdessamad Bounoua	MC Oran	Free transfer	
17 August 2022	FW	(Nigeria) Tosin Omoyele	(Nigeria) Enyimba	Free transfer	
18 August 2022	FW	(Ghana) Maxwell Baakoh	(Ghana) Asante Kotoko	Free transfer	

==== Winter ====
Date	Pos	Player	From club	Transfer fee	Source
18 January 2023	FW	(Algeria) Ilyes Yaiche	(Kuwait) Qadsia SC	Free transfer	
24 January 2023	MF	(Algeria) Sid Ali Lamri	HB Chelghoum Laïd	Free transfer	
2 February 2023	CB	(Algeria) Anes Saad	CR Ben Badis	Free transfer	
5 February 2023	FW	(Algeria) Abderrahmane Bacha	USM Alger	Loan	

=== Out ===
==== Winter ====
Date	Pos	Player	To club	Transfer fee	Source
19 January 2023	MF	(Algeria) Mohammed Essaid Bourahla	NC Magra	Free transfer	
22 January 2023	FW	(Algeria) Mounir Aichi	NC Magra	Free transfer	
5 February 2023	FW	(Algeria) Chakib Berkani	NC Magra	Free transfer	

== Competitions ==
=== Overview ===
Competition	Record								Started round	Final position / round	First match	Last match
Competition	G	W	D	L	GF	GA	GD	Win %	Started round	Final position / round	First match	Last match
Ligue 1	30	12	6	12	29	29	+0	40.00	—N/a	8th	27 August 2022	15 July 2023
Algerian Cup	3	2	0	1	5	3	+2	66.67	Round of 64	Round of 16	20 December 2022	28 April 2023
Total	33	14	6	13	34	32	+2	42.42				

Updated to match played 15 July 2023
Source: Competitions

=== Ligue 1 ===
==== League table ====
Pos	Team	Pld	W	D	L	GF	GA	GD	Pts	Qualification or relegation
6	ES Sétif	30	11	9	10	38	32	+6	42	
7	ASO Chlef	30	11	9	10	36	31	+5	42	Qualification for CAF Confederation Cup (Note: ASO Chlef qualified for the 2023–24 CAF Confederation Cup by winning the 2022–23 Algerian Cup.)
8	USM Khenchela	30	12	6	12	29	29	0	42	
9	Paradou AC	30	11	8	11	35	33	+2	41	
10	MC Oran	30	11	8	11	27	34	−7	41	

Updated to match(es) played on 15 July 2023. Source: the-sports.org
Rules for classification: 1) points; 2) head-to-head points; 3) head-to-head goal difference; 4) goal difference; 5) total goals; 6) fairplay ranking; 7) playoff.

==== Results summary ====
Overall								Home						Away					
Pld	W	D	L	GF	GA	GD	Pts	W	D	L	GF	GA	GD	W	D	L	GF	GA	GD
30	12	6	12	29	29	0	42	9	4	2	20	5	+15	3	2	10	9	24	−15

Last updated: 15 July 2023.
Source: Competitive matches

==== Results by round ====
Round	1	2	3	4	5	6	7	8	9	10	11	12	13	14	15	16	17	18	19	20	21	22	23	24	25	26	27	28	29	30
Ground	A	H	A	A	H	A	H	A	H	A	H	A	H	A	H	H	A	H	H	A	H	A	H	A	H	A	H	A	H	A
Result	L	L	L	D	W	W	W	W	W	L	W	L	D	L	W	D	L	L	D	W	W	D	W	L	D	L	W	L	W	L
Position	14	16	16	15	13	11	8	5	4	6	6	7	7	8	7	8	8	8	10	8	7	7	6	8	8	8	8	8	5	8

Updated to match(es) played on 15 July 2023. Source: Competitive matches
A = Away; H = Home; W = Win; D = Draw; L = Loss

==== Matches ====
The league fixtures were announced on 19 July 2022.

26 August 2022 Round 1	CS Constantine	3–1	USM Khenchela	Constantine
16:45	Dib 24'; Koukpo 63'; Khaldi 70'	Report	Sameur 49' (pen.)	Stadium: Ramadane Ben Abdelmalek Stadium; Referee: Lotfi Bekouassa

2 September 2022 Round 2	USM Khenchela	0–1	USM Alger	Khenchela
16:30	Baakoh (yellow card) 65'; Bayazid (yellow card) 70'; Sameur (yellow card) 73'	Report	Belaïd 6'; Alharaish (yellow card) 68'	Stadium: Amar Hamam Stadium; Referee: Mustapha Ghorbal

3 September 2022 Round 3	MC El Bayadh	2–0	USM Khenchela	El Bayadh
17:00	Moussaoui 6' (pen.); Ghennam 77'	Report		Stadium: Zakaria Medjdoub Stadium; Referee: Marouane Mohamed Belkebir

24 September 2022 Round 5	USM Khenchela	2–0	HB Chelghoum Laïd	Khenchela
16:30	Bayazid 31', 36'	Report		Stadium: Amar Hamam Stadium; Referee: Mohamed Amine Benzohra

2 October 2022 Round 6	Paradou AC	0–1	USM Khenchela	Dar El Beïda
16:00		Report	Zaidi 84'	Stadium: Omar Benrabah Stadium; Referee: Bilal Bendjahene

8 October 2022 Round 7	USM Khenchela	1–0	MC Oran	Khenchela
15:00	Baakoh 7'	Report		Stadium: Amar Hamam Stadium; Referee: Malik Ait Ameur

13 October 2022 Round 8	ES Sétif	1–2	USM Khenchela	Sétif
15:30	Akziz 90+4'	Report	Bayazid 58'; Sameur 90+2' (pen.)	Stadium: 8 May 1945 Stadium; Referee: Bilal Soltani

21 October 2022 Round 9	USM Khenchela	2–0	MC Alger	Khenchela
15:00	Omoyele 5'; Bayazid 59'	Report		Stadium: Amar Hamam Stadium; Referee: Mohamed Bouteraa

25 October 2022 Round 4	JS Kabylie	0–0	USM Khenchela	Tizi Ouzou
17:00		Report		Stadium: 1 November 1954 Stadium; Referee: Nabil Boukhalfa

6 November 2022 Round 10	JS Saoura	1–0	USM Khenchela	Béchar
18:00	Bellatreche 62' (pen.)	Report		Stadium: 20 August 1955 Stadium; Referee: Mohamed Saidi

12 November 2022 Round 11	USM Khenchela	1–0	US Biskra	Khenchela
15:00	Kaddour 90+1'	Report		Stadium: Amar Hamam Stadium; Referee: Billel Soltani

29 November 2022 Round 12	RC Arbaâ	5–1	USM Khenchela	Larbaâ
15:00	Brahmi 5'; Toumi 18', 46'; Saidani 64'; Deghmani 87'	Report	Berkani 65'	Stadium: Ismaïl Makhlouf Stadium; Referee: Ali Nader

7 December 2022 Round 13	USM Khenchela	1–1	NC Magra	Khenchela
15:00	Baakoh 6'	Report	Zeghad 32'	Stadium: Amar Hamam Stadium; Referee: Anes Azrine

11 December 2022 Round 14	CR Belouizdad	2–0	USM Khenchela	Belouizdad
15:00	Belkhadem 56', 63'	Report		Stadium: 20 August 1955 Stadium; Referee: Houssam Benyahia

24 December 2022 Round 15	USM Khenchela	2–0	ASO Chlef	Khenchela
14:30	Bayazid 9', 65'	Report		Stadium: Amar Hamam Stadium; Referee: Lahlou Benbrahem

10 February 2023 Round 16	USM Khenchela	1–1	CS Constantine	Khenchela
15:00	Athmani 5'	Report	Madani 90+2'	Stadium: Amar Hamam Stadium; Referee: Lyes Bekouassa

25 February 2023 Round 18	USM Khenchela	0–1	MC El Bayadh	Khenchela
15:00		Report	Belmokhtar 39'	Stadium: Amar Hamam Stadium; Referee: Lotfi Bekouassa

18 March 2023 Round 20	HB Chelghoum Laïd	1–2	USM Khenchela	Chelghoum Laïd
15:00	Bekhouche 90+1' (pen.)	Report	Bayazid 40' (pen.); Saâdou 65'	Stadium: 11 December 1961 Stadium; Referee: Walid Lahreche

1 April 2023 Round 21	USM Khenchela	3–0	Paradou AC	Khenchela
15:45	Bayazid 30'; Yaiche 45'; Baakoh 66'	Report		Stadium: Amar Hamam Stadium; Referee: Mohamed Bouteraa

8 April 2023 Round 22	MC Oran	1–1	USM Khenchela	Oran
22:00	Nehari 73'	Report	Bayazid 90+4'	Stadium: Ahmed Zabana Stadium; Referee: Mohamed Amine Benzohra

12 April 2023 Round 17	USM Alger	2–0	USM Khenchela	Algiers
22:30	Alilet 15'; Benzaza 34'	Report		Stadium: Stade du 5 Juillet; Referee: Nabil Boukhalfa

9 May 2023 Round 19	USM Khenchela	0–0	JS Kabylie	Khenchela
16:00		Report		Stadium: Amar Hamam Stadium; Referee: Mustapha Ghorbal

17 May 2023 Round 23	USM Khenchela	1–0	ES Sétif	Khenchela
16:00	Omoyele 34'	Report		Stadium: Amar Hamam Stadium; Referee: Anes Azrine

30 May 2023 Round 24	MC Alger	1–0	USM Khenchela	Dar El Beïda
16:00	Abdellaoui 23'	Report		Stadium: Omar Benrabah Stadium; Referee: Nabil Boukhalfa

6 June 2023 Round 25	USM Khenchela	0–0	JS Saoura	Khenchela
16:30		Report		Stadium: Amar Hamam Stadium; Referee: Ali Nader

1 July 2023 Round 26	US Biskra	1–0	USM Khenchela	Biskra
17:00	Baâli 42'	Report		Stadium: 18 February Stadium; Referee: Lyes Bekouassa

4 July 2023 Round 27	USM Khenchela	2–1	RC Arbaâ	Khenchela
17:00	Baakoh 5'; Lamri 82'	Report	Toual 13'	Stadium: Amar Hamam Stadium; Referee: Akram Mechairia

7 July 2023 Round 28	NC Magra	2–1	USM Khenchela	Magra
17:15	Salah 22'; Saidi 62' (pen.)	Report	Baakoh 89'	Stadium: Boucheligue Brothers Stadium; Referee: Masinissa Serjane

10 July 2023 Round 29	USM Khenchela	4–0	CR Belouizdad	Khenchela
17:15	Bayazid 36', 39', 51'; Semahi 90+4'	Report		Stadium: Amar Hamam Stadium; Referee: Abdennacer Baatouche

15 July 2023 Round 30	ASO Chlef	2–0	USM Khenchela	Chlef
20:30	Souibaâh 82' (pen.); Boussaid 84'	Report		Stadium: Mohamed Boumezrag Stadium; Referee: Youcef Tayeb Bouderbali

=== Algerian Cup ===
20 December 2022 Round of 64	USM Khenchela	1–0 (a.e.t.)	IS Tighennif	Khenchela
14:00	Athmani (penalty missed) 78'; Sameur 105'	Report		Stadium: Amar Hamam Stadium; Referee: Riadh Ammar Khodja
Note: USM Khenchela Lineups: Filali, Attou, Ameur, Saâdou, Hoggas, Bourahla (Sameur, 91'), Ziad (Semahi, 68'), Berkani (Aïb, 115'), Athmani (Zaidi, 91'), Aichi (Bayazid, 68'), Omoyele (Hadded, 68').

3 March 2023 Round of 32	USM Khenchela	4–0	IRB Maghnia	Khenchela
14:00	Bayazid 39' (pen.), 50' (pen.); Yaiche 50'; Baakoh 81'	Report		Stadium: Amar Hamam Stadium; Referee: Mohamed Makfoudji
Note: USM Khenchela Lineups: Brahimi, Attou, Lamri, Saâdou, Aïb, Hadded, Ziad (Sameur, 77'), Yaiche (Athmani, 77'), Baakoh, Zaidi (Semahi, 64'), Bayazid (Bacha, 64').

28 April 2023 Round of 16	Olympique Akbou	3–0	USM Khenchela	Béjaïa
15:00	Rahal 19' (pen.); Mebarakou 59'; Bouzeraa 90+3'	Report		Stadium: Maghrebi Unity Stadium; Referee: Ali Nader
Note: USM Khenchela Lineups: Brahimi, Kaddour, Hoggas, Saâdou, Aïb, Lamri (Semahi, 46'), Hadded (Zaidi, 71'), Athmani (Filali, 18'), Yaiche, Baakoh, Bayazid.

== Squad information ==
=== Playing statistics ===
No.	Pos	Nat	Player	Total		Ligue 1		Algerian Cup	
No.	Pos	Nat	Player	Apps	Goals	Apps	Goals	Apps	Goals
Goalkeepers
1	GK	(Algeria) ALG	Oussama Filali	16	0	14	0	2	0
16	GK	(Algeria) ALG	Abdelhamid Brahimi	18	0	16	0	2	0
Defenders
2	DF	(Algeria) ALG	Anes Saad	3	0	3	0	0	0
5	DF	(Algeria) ALG	Nabil Saâdou	33	1	30	1	3	0
12	DF	(Algeria) ALG	Oussama Kaddour	28	1	27	1	1	0
15	DF	(Algeria) ALG	Abdelhalim Ameur	13	0	12	0	1	0
21	DF	(Algeria) ALG	Aymen Attou	18	0	16	0	2	0
22	DF	(Algeria) ALG	Mohamed Achref Aib	26	0	23	0	3	0
25	DF	(Algeria) ALG	Abdelhafid Hoggas	20	0	18	0	2	0
26	DF	(Algeria) ALG	Abdellah Meddah	18	0	18	0	0	0
Midfielders
8	MF	(Algeria) ALG	Abdelhakim Sameur	29	3	27	2	2	1
10	MF	(Algeria) ALG	Mohamed Yacine Athmani	22	1	19	1	3	0
14	MF	(Algeria) ALG	Foued Hadded	29	0	26	0	3	0
18	MF	(Algeria) ALG	Hamza Ziad	9	0	7	0	2	0
27	MF	(Algeria) ALG	Sid Ali Lamri	14	1	12	1	2	0
Forwards
7	FW	(Algeria) ALG	Sofiane Bayazid	30	14	27	12	3	2
9	FW	(Algeria) ALG	Ilyes Yaiche	9	2	7	1	2	1
11	FW	(Algeria) ALG	Hamza Zaidi	29	1	26	1	3	0
13	FW	(Algeria) ALG	Mohamed Amine Semahi	25	1	22	1	3	0
17	FW	(Algeria) ALG	Abderrahmane Bacha	8	0	7	0	1	0
19	FW	(Ghana) GHA	Maxwell Baakoh	28	6	26	5	2	1
20	FW	(Nigeria) NGR	Tosin Omoyele	28	2	27	2	1	0
Players transferred out during the season
24	MF	(Algeria) ALG	Mohammed Essaid Bourahla	9	0	8	0	1	0
17	FW	(Algeria) ALG	Mounir Aichi	5	0	4	0	1	0
23	FW	(Algeria) ALG	Chakib Berkani	11	1	10	1	1	0

Last updated: 15 July 2023
Source: soccerway.com

=== Goalscorers ===
As of 15 July 2023

Includes all competitive matches. The list is sorted alphabetically by surname when total goals are equal.

No.	Nat.	Player	Pos.	L 1	AC	TOTAL
7	(Algeria)	Sofiane Bayazid	FW	12	2	14
19	(Ghana)	Maxwell Baakoh	FW	5	1	6
8	(Algeria)	Abdelhakim Sameur	MF	2	1	3
9	(Algeria)	Ilyes Yaiche	FW	1	1	2
20	(Nigeria)	Tosin Omoyele	FW	2	0	2
11	(Algeria)	Hamza Zaidi	FW	1	0	1
12	(Algeria)	Oussama Kaddour	DF	1	0	1
23	(Algeria)	Chakib Berkani	MF	1	0	1
10	(Algeria)	Mohamed Yassine Athmani	MF	1	0	1
5	(Algeria)	Nabil Saâdou	DF	1	0	1
27	(Algeria)	Sid Ali Lamri	MF	1	0	1
13	(Algeria)	Mohamed Amine Semahi	FW	1	0	1
Own Goals				0	0	0
Totals				29	5	34
