= 2023–24 Algerian Cup =

- Stade du 5 Juillet hosted the final

Tournament details
- Country: Algeria
- Dates: 2 February 2024 – 5 July 2024
- Teams: 64 (as of first national round)

Final positions
- Champions: CR Belouizdad
- Runners-up: MC Alger

Tournament statistics
- Matches played: 63
- Goals scored: 171 (2.71 per match)
- Top goal scorer(s): Akram Djahnit; Abdoulaye Kanou (4 goals)
- All statistics correct as of 5 July 2024.

The 2023–24 Algerian Cup (Arabic: كأس الجزائر 24-2023) is the 57th edition of the Algerian Cup. It is sponsored by Mobilis and known as the Mobilis Algerian Cup for sponsorship purposes. The winners will qualify to the 2024–25 CAF Confederation Cup. ASO Chlef are the defending champions.

== Teams ==
Round	Clubs remaining	Clubs involved	Winners from previous round	New entries this round	Leagues entering at this round
Regional rounds
First round	192	-	-	-	Ligue de Football de la Wilaya; Ligue Régional II; Ligue Régional I Inter-Régions Division; Algerian Ligue 2
Second round	96	-	-	-	none
National rounds
Round of 64	64	64	48	16	Algerian Ligue Professionnelle 1
Round of 32	32	32	32	none	none
Round of 16	16	16	16	none	none
Quarter-finals	8	8	8	none	none
Semi-finals	4	4	4	none	none
Final	2	2	2	none	none

== Round of 64 ==
The draw was made on 7 January 2024.

2 February 2024	JS Azazga (3)	5–0	US Tébessa (3)	Azazga
15:00	Derradji 25'; Boussaid 72', 75'; Berkane 77'; Amokrane 90+3'	Report		Stadium: Tirsatine Stadium; Referee: Oussama Makfoudji

2 February 2024	AS Khroub (2)	5–0	CRB Hennaya (3)	El Khroub
14:30	Bayoud 11', 39', 75'; Menacer 52' (pen.); Remita 65'	Report		Stadium: Abed Hamdani Stadium; Referee: Massihedine Benkhellaf

2 February 2024	CRB Ben Badis (3)	2–1	JM Sidi Salem (5)	Sidi Bel Abbès
14:30	Mebari 76'; Habis 87'	Report	Abdelli 89'	Stadium: 24 February 1956 Stadium; Referee: Mohamed Reda Remada

2 February 2024	NRB Teleghma (2)	0–2	MC Alger (1)	Mila
14:30		Report	Bayazid 45'; Merzougui 87'	Stadium: Belkacem Belaid Stadium; Referee: Mohamed Saidi

2 February 2024	JS Djijel (3)	2–0	MC Ouled Yaïche (4)	Jijel
14:30	Hadef 45+3'; Guettout	Report		Stadium: Hocine Rouibah Stadium; Referee: Walid Mansri

2 February 2024	IRB Ouargla (2)	0–1	Paradou AC (1)	Ouargla
14:30		Report	Soukkou 70'	Stadium: 18 February Stadium; Referee: Abdenacer Baatouche

2 February 2024	AB Barika (3)	1–2	ASO Chlef (1)	Barika
14:30	Zouaoui 9'	Report	Aliane 2'; Addadi 68'	Stadium: Mohamed Ghalmi Stadium; Referee: Massinissa Serdjane

2 February 2024	US Chaouia (3)	3–1	JSM Tiaret (2)	Oum El Bouaghi
14:30	Youcef Khoudja 34'; Belhamel 47'; Melouk 66'	Report	Merazi 77'	Stadium: Hassouna Zerdani Stadium; Referee: Mohamed Sakhraoui

2 February 2024	GC Mascara (3)	2–1	MB Hassi Messaoud (3)	Mascara
14:30	Ferroudj 82'; Benchenane 87'	Report	Saad Allah 66'	Stadium: Aoued Meflah Stadium; Referee: Fodil Oukil

2 February 2024	NA Hussein Dey (2)	1–1 (a.e.t.) (4–2 p)	WA Mostaganem (2)	Belouizdad
14:30	Harfouche 101'	Report	Benaceur 94'	Stadium: 20 August 1955 Stadium; Referee: Naim Bouara

2 February 2024	CRB Beni Tamou (3)	0–1	Olympique Akbou (2)	Blida
14:30		Report	Hamek 38' (pen.)	Stadium: Brakni Brothers Stadium; Referee: Tahar Boudjemaa

2 February 2024	ASM Oran (2)	2–0	IB Khémis El Khechna (2)	Oran
14:30	Guiz 53'; Bentiba 74'	Report		Stadium: Habib Bouakeul Stadium; Referee: Ahmed Benhamou

2 February 2024	USM Annaba (2)	3–2	SA Sétifien (4)	Annaba
14:30	Belhani 14', 23', 50'	Report	Bakhbakh 41'; Benchergui 54'	Stadium: Abdelkader Chabou Stadium; Referee: Djamel Eddine Zenati

2 February 2024	NRB Tazouguert (3)	1–2	ES Sétif (1)	Khenchela
14:30	Kouadria 53'	Report	Bouchoucha 25', 69'	Stadium: Amar Hamam Stadium; Referee: Zine El Abidine Dekhane

2 February 2024	US Souf (1)	1–3	ES Ben Aknoun (1)	El Oued
14:30	Chacha 89'	Report	Hadji 44', 86' (pen.); Atif 62'	Stadium: 1 November 1954 Stadium; Referee: Mehadji Tayeb Bouderbal

2 February 2024	RC Bougaa (3)	2–0	Nasr El Fedjoudj (3)	Sétif
15:00	Chouki 37', 78'	Report		Stadium: 8 May 1945 Stadium; Referee: Elhadj Chihaoui

3 February 2024	SCM Oran (3)	0–3	ES Mostaganem (2)	Oran
13:45		Report	Ziad 45+1' (pen.); Abdat 55'; Zahzouh 90+2'	Stadium: Habib Bouakeul Stadium; Referee: Mohamed Beloufa

3 February 2024	CA Batna (2)	2–0	ES Bouakal (3)	Batna
13:45	Righi 80' (pen.); Boumaiza 89'	Report		Stadium: 1 November 1954 Stadium; Referee: Mohamed Keralifa

3 February 2024	CRB Bougtob (3)	0–2	JS Saoura (1)	Bougtob
13:45		Report	Belhachemi 67'; Taib 89' (pen.)	Stadium: Bougtob Municipal Stadium; Referee: Zakaria Antar

3 February 2024	E Sour El Ghozlane (2)	0–0 (a.e.t.) (0–3 p)	Hydra AC (4)	Sour El-Ghozlane
13:45		Report		Stadium: Mohamed Derradji Stadium; Referee: Mohamed Milia

3 February 2024	CR Zaouia (3)	1–0 (a.e.t.)	CRB Adrar (3)	Blida
13:45	Sahri 111'	Report		Stadium: Brakni Brothers Stadium; Referee: Mohamed Sahouadj

3 February 2024	MC Oran (1)	3–0	CR Béni Thour (3)	Oran
13:45	Boussalem 25', 78'; Benayad 85'	Report		Stadium: Ahmed Zabana Stadium; Referee: Adel Facih

3 February 2024	US Biskra (1)	3–0	AS Bordj Ghédir (3)	Biskra
13:45	Daouadji 9'; Darfalou 58', 85'	Report		Stadium: 18 February Stadium; Referee: Redouane Allou

3 February 2024	IS Tighennif (3)	2–1	JS El Biar (3)	Tighennif
13:45	Toubal 19'; Bouarg 78'	Report	Batouche 49'	Stadium: Hassaine Lakehal Stadium; Referee: Ayoub Belhachemi

3 February 2024	MO Constantine (2)	4–1	IRB Tiaret (3)	Constantine
13:45	Grioua 1', 81', 85'; Zergine 32'	Report	Abed 11'	Stadium: Ramadane Ben Abdelmalek Stadium; Referee: Loualeh

3 February 2024	USM Khenchela (1)	4–0	WA Boufarik (2)	Khenchela
13:45	Sameur 16' (pen.); Ogbi 39'; Omoyele 55'; Saâdou 58'	Report		Stadium: Amar Hamam Stadium; Referee: Fateh Harkat

3 February 2024	WA Tlemcen (3)	1–0	USM Blida (3)	Tlemcen
13:45	Belmir 85'	Report		Stadium: Colonel Lotfi Stadium; Referee: Mohamed Bouchaker

3 February 2024	MB Rouissat (3)	1–0 (a.e.t.)	JS Guir (2)	Ouargla
13:45	Bensaci 91'	Report		Stadium: 18 February Stadium; Referee: Ahmed Daas

4 February 2024	US Boukhadra (3)	2–5	USM Alger (1)	Annaba
13:45	Kaidi 75'; Anis Khazri 88' (pen.)	Report	Kanou 40', 43'; Bounacer 50'; Bouchina 60'; Barkat 70'	Stadium: Abdelkader Chabou Stadium; Referee: Haithem Ghouti

4 February 2024	NC Magra (1)	0–2	CS Constantine (1)	Magra
13:45		Report	Belhocini 38'; Chekal 90+3'	Stadium: Boucheligue Brothers Stadium; Referee: Lyes Bekouassa

19 February 2024	MC El Bayadh (1)	1–1 (a.e.t.) (3–5 p)	SC Mécheria (2)	El Bayadh
14:00	Sediri 1'	Report	Kebli 18'	Stadium: Zakaria Medjdoub Stadium

5 March 2024	JS Kabylie (1)	0–2	CR Belouizdad (1)	Tizi Ouzou
18:00		Report	Benguit 52'; Wamba 57' (pen.)	Stadium: 1 November 1954 Stadium; Referee: Nabil Boukhalfa

== Round of 32 ==
The draw was made on 7 January 2024.

8 March 2024	IS Tighennif (3)	1–3	ES Mostaganem (2)	Tighennif
14:30	Mahi 65'	Report	Ghanem 11'; Boukhenna 77'; Chaouti 86'	Stadium: Hassaine Lakehal Stadium; Referee: Haithem Ghouti

8 March 2024	NA Hussein Dey (2)	1–0	MO Constantine (2)	Belouizdad
15:00	Benyahia 98'	Report		Stadium: 20 August 1955 Stadium; Referee: Yahia Dahar

8 March 2024	ASO Chlef (1)	2–2 (a.e.t.) (3–5 p)	US Biskra (1)	Chlef
15:00	Aguieb 45+2'; Agbagno 65'	Report	Boukarroum 20' (pen.); Rahmoun 45'	Stadium: Mohamed Boumezrag Stadium; Referee: Houssam Benyahia

8 March 2024	USM Khenchela (1)	3-2 (a.e.t.)	GC Mascara (2)	Khenchela
15:00	Sabouni 19' (pen.); Semahi 20'; Rebai 99'	Report	Benchenane 41'; Larbi 50'	Stadium: Amar Hamam Stadium; Referee: Mohamed Amine Chaoubi

8 March 2024	Paradou AC (1)	1–2	MC Oran (1)	Dar El Beïda
15:00	Boulbina 76'	Report	Kerroum 88'; Motrani 90+1'	Stadium: Omar Benrabah Stadium; Referee: Billel Soltani

8 March 2024	USM Alger (1)	8–0	MB Rouissat (3)	Algiers
18:00	Bellatreche 5', 50'; Djahnit 24', 41', 74'; Belaïd 53' (pen.); Ateba 64', 87'	Report		Stadium: Stade du 5 Juillet; Referee: Ahmed Benhamou

9 March 2024	Hydra AC (4)	0–1	JS Djijel (3)	Dar El Beïda
14:30		Report	Layeche 52'	Stadium: Omar Benrabah Stadium; Referee: Mohamed Beloufa

9 March 2024	JS Azazga (3)	1–1 (a.e.t.) (8-7 p)	CRB Ben Badis (3)	Azazga
14:30		Report		Stadium: Tirsatine Stadium; Referee: Mohamed Belkebir

9 March 2024	US Chaouia (3)	1–1 (a.e.t.) (3–5 p)	RC Bougaa (3)	Oum El Bouaghi
14:30	Belaïd 23' (pen.)	Report	Deffar 46'	Stadium: Hassouna Zerdani Stadium; Referee: Djameleddine Zenati

9 March 2024	Olympique Akbou (2)	2–0	SC Mécheria (2)	Akbou
14:30	Adrar 17'; Mizi 25'			Stadium: 1 November 1954 Stadium; Referee: Mohamed Amine Benzohra

9 March 2024	WA Tlemcen (3)	0–0 (a.e.t.) (7–6 p)	JS Saoura (1)	Tlemcen
14:30		Report		Stadium: Colonel Lotfi Stadium; Referee: Fateh Harkat

9 March 2024	CA Batna (2)	0–0 (a.e.t.) (2–3 p)	USM Annaba (2)	Batna
15:00		Report		Stadium: 1 November 1954 Stadium; Referee: Abderahmane Sahraoui

9 March 2024	ES Ben Aknoun (1)	3–0	ASM Oran (2)	Belouizdad
15:00	Zaouche 29'; Hachoud 56'; Toual 90'	Report		Stadium: 20 August 1955 Stadium; Referee: Tahar Boudjemaa

9 March 2024	CR Zaouia (3)	1–4	MC Alger (1)	Blida
15:00	Chihane 21' (pen.)	Report	Naidji 32'; Merzougui 57' (pen.); Boucherit 78', 88'	Stadium: Mustapha Tchaker Stadium; Referee: Akram Mechairia

9 March 2024	ES Sétif (1)	1–1 (a.e.t.) (8–9 p)	CS Constantine (1)	Sétif
16:45	Oukil 32'	Report	Méyé 75'	Stadium: 8 May 1945 Stadium; Referee: Mustapha Ghorbal
	Penalties
	Ziti (penalty scored); Chikhi (penalty scored); Jiddou (penalty scored); Aggoun (penalty scored); Zamoum (penalty scored); Chaabi (penalty scored); Hitala (penalty scored); Brahimi (penalty missed); Guettaf (penalty scored); Saidi (penalty missed)		(penalty scored) Dib; (penalty scored) Merbah; (penalty scored) Messibah; (penalty scored) Chekal; (penalty scored) Madani; (penalty scored) Zaalani; (penalty scored) Belaili; (penalty missed) Baouche; (penalty scored) Temine; (penalty scored) Bouhalfaya

9 March 2024	CR Belouizdad (1)	2–1	AS Khroub (2)	Algiers
18:00	Bouchar 29'; Meziane 45+2'	Report	Oukkal 52' (pen.)	Stadium: Stade du 5 Juillet; Referee: Rafik Aouina

== Round of 16 ==
The draw was made on 17 March 2024.

29 March 2024	ES Mostaganem (2)	1–1 (a.e.t.) (13–12 p)	NA Hussein Dey (2)	Mostaganem
22:00	Ghanem 49'	Report	Benyahia 80' (pen.)	Stadium: Mohamed Bensaïd Stadium; Referee: Rafik Aouina

29 March 2024	CR Belouizdad (1)	2–0	Olympique Akbou (2)	Algiers
22:00	Meziane 73'; Benguit 78'	Report		Stadium: Stade du 5 Juillet; Referee: Mustapha Ghorbal

29 March 2024	USM Annaba (2)	0–2	CS Constantine (1)	Annaba
22:00		Report	Dib 45+3' (pen.); Khaldi 80'	Stadium: 19 May 1956 Stadium; Referee: Lotfi Bekouassa

30 March 2024	ES Ben Aknoun (1)	1–0	JS Djijel (3)	Belouizdad
15:00	Haroun 45+2'	Report		Stadium: 20 August 1955 Stadium; Referee: Yahia Dahar

30 March 2024	USM Khenchela (1)	1–2	MC Alger (1)	Khenchela
15:30	Sameur 55' (pen.)	Report	Belaïli 11' (pen.); Bayazid 45'	Stadium: Amar Hamam Stadium; Referee: Youcef Gamouh

30 March 2024	US Biskra (1)	1–0	MC Oran (1)	Biskra
22:00	Medane 65'	Report		Stadium: 18 February Stadium; Referee: Anes Azrine

30 March 2024	JS Azazga (3)	2–2 (a.e.t.) (0–1 p)	WA Tlemcen (3)	Tizi Ouzou
22:00	Derradji 37' (pen.); Hamzaoui 64'	Report	Hadjib 10'; Aichi 68'	Stadium: 1 November 1954 Stadium; Referee: Haithem Ghouti
	Penalties
	? (penalty missed) ? (penalty missed) ? (penalty missed) ? (penalty missed) ? (penalty missed)		(penalty missed) ? (penalty scored) ? (penalty missed) ? (penalty missed) ?

12 April 2024	USM Alger (1)	7–0	RC Bougaa (3)	Algiers
17:30	Belaïd 39'; Bellatreche 50'; Djahnit 55'; Belkacemi 68', 76'; Kanou 73', 81'	Report		Stadium: Stade du 5 Juillet; Referee: Fodil Oukil

== Quarter-finals ==
The draw was made on 17 March 2024. The quarter-final games were played at neutral venues.

12 April 2024	CR Belouizdad (1)	3–3 (a.e.t.) (4–2 p)	ES Mostaganem (2)	Constantine
17:30	Belkhir 38'; Wamba 58'; Meziane 92'	Report	Salhi 16' (pen.); Ziad 90+3'; Chouari 111'	Stadium: Chahid Hamlaoui Stadium; Referee: Youcef Gamouh; Assistant referees: Antar Boulfelfel, Haithem Bouima; Fourth official: Fateh Harkat
	Penalties
	Laouafi (penalty scored); Mrezigue (penalty scored); Wamba (penalty scored); Bouras (penalty scored)		(penalty scored) Ziad; (penalty missed) Salhi; (penalty scored) Ghanem; (penalty missed) Benhammou

13 April 2024	CS Constantine (1)	0–0 (a.e.t.) (5–4 p)	ES Ben Aknoun (1)	Bir El Djir
17:30		Report		Stadium: Miloud Hadefi Stadium; Referee: Mustapha Ghorbal; Assistant referees: Yacine Ouerd Benslama, Asma Feriel Ouahab; Fourth official: Mehadji Tayeb Bouderbal
	Penalties
	Dib (penalty scored); Rebiaï (penalty scored); Zaalani (penalty missed); Madani (penalty scored); Benchaâ (penalty missed); Temine (penalty scored); Meddahi (penalty scored)		(penalty missed) Hachoud; (penalty scored) Bencherifa; (penalty missed) Hadji; (penalty scored) Benabdi; (penalty scored) Daoud; (penalty scored) Boutiche; (penalty missed) Ait Mouloud

14 April 2024	WA Tlemcen (3)	0–2	MC Alger (1)	Algiers
20:30		Report	Belaïli 45' (pen.); Ouattara 79'	Stadium: Stade du 5 Juillet; Referee: Ghada Mehat; Assistant referees: Mokrane Gourari, Akram Zerhouni; Fourth official: Lotfi Bekouassa

16 April 2024	US Biskra (1)	1–3	USM Alger (1)	Annaba
20:30	Siam 23'	Report	Bacha 22'; Belaïd 74'; Belkacemi 78'	Stadium: 19 May 1956 Stadium; Referee: Lahlou Benbraham; Assistant referees: Hamza Bouzit, Amirouche Boufassa; Fourth official: Abdelmoumen Touabti

== Semi-finals ==
The draw was made on 17 April 2024. The semi-final games were played at neutral venues.

23 April 2024	MC Alger (1)	2–1 (a.e.t.)	CS Constantine (1)	Bir El Djir
21:00	Zougrana 78'; Abdellaoui 115'	Report	Madani 19'	Attendance: 0 (close doors); Referee: Lahlou Benbraham; Assistant referees: Mokrane Gourari, Yacine Ouard Benslama; Fourth official: Nabil Boukhalfa

24 April 2024	CR Belouizdad (1)	0–0 (a.e.t.) (3–1 p)	USM Alger (1)	Baraki
21:00		Report		Stadium: Nelson Mandela Stadium; Referee: Lotfi Bekouassa; Assistant referees: Akram Zarhouni, Adel Abane; Fourth official: Youcef Gamouh
	Penalties
	Laouafi (penalty scored); Benguit (penalty missed); Belkhir (penalty scored); Wamba (penalty scored)		(penalty missed) Belaïd; (penalty missed) Radouani; (penalty missed) Djahnit; (penalty scored) Alilet

== Final ==
5 July 2024	MC Alger (1)	0–1	CR Belouizdad (1)	Algiers
17:00		Report	Keddad 42'	Stadium: Stade du 5 Juillet; Referee: Mustapha Ghorbal

== Statistics ==
=== Top scorers ===
Rank	Goalscorer	Club	Goals
1	(Algeria) Akram Djahnit	USM Alger	4
1	(Mali) Abdoulaye Kanou	USM Alger	4
3	(Algeria) Oussama Bellatreche	USM Alger	3
3	(Algeria) Ismaïl Belkacemi	USM Alger	3
3	(Algeria) Zineddine Belaïd	USM Alger	3
3	(Algeria) Abderrahmane Meziane	CR Belouizdad	3
3	(Algeria) Karim Belhani	USM Annaba	3
3	(Algeria) Mohamed Grioua	MO Constantine	3
3	(Algeria) Mohamed Bayoud	AS Khroub	3

Updated to games played on 5 July 2024.

== See also ==
- 2023–24 Algerian Ligue Professionnelle 1
- 2023–24 Algerian Ligue 2
- 2024 Algerian Super Cup
