= Abbes Laghrour University =

Educational institution in Khenchela, Algeria

Abbes Laghrour University - Khenchela
- جامعة عباس لغرور خنشلة
- Type: Public university
- Established: 2001
- Affiliations: Ministry of Higher Education and Scientific Research
- Rector: Prof. Chala Abedalouahade
- Academic staff: 646 (in 2018)
- Students: 14,955 (in 2018)
- Location: Khenchela, Algeria; 35.4699687°N 7.0924784°E
- Language: French, Arabic
- Website: www.univ-khenchela.com

Abbes Laghrour University - Khenchela is a university located in the commune of Khenchela, Algeria.

== History ==
The university is named after one of the nationalist leaders of the FLN during the Algerian War, Abbas Laghrour.

== Components ==
Initially, the university center comprised two faculties: the Institute of Letters and Languages and the Institute of Legal and Administrative Sciences. In 2006, other faculties were added, including the Institute of Science and Technology and the Institute of Economic, Commercial, and Management Sciences.

In 2011, the university center of Khenchela was upgraded to the status of a university, adding more faculties: the Faculty of Natural and Life Sciences and the Faculty of Social and Human Sciences.

== See also ==
- List of Algerian universities
