= Djabel Manishimwe =

Rwandan footballer

Personal information
- Full name: Djabel Manishimwe
- Date of birth: 10 May 1998 (age 28)
- Place of birth: Kiramuruzi, Rwanda
- Height: 1.71 m (5 ft 7 in)
- Position: Midfielder

Team information
- Current team: Naft Al-Wasat Sports Club
- Number: 15

Senior career*
Years	Team	Apps	(Gls)
2013–2014	Isonga		
2014–2019	Rayon Sports		
2019–2023	APR		
2023–2024	USM Khenchela	3	(0)
2024–2024	Al-Quwa Al-Jawiya	0	(0)
2024-	Naft Al-Wasat Sports Club	5	(2)

International career
2017–	Rwanda	16	(0)
- * Club domestic league appearances and goals as of 9 September 2023

Djabel Manishimwe (born 10 May 1998) is a Rwandan football midfielder who currently plays for Al-Quwa Al-Jawiya. He was a squad member for the 2017 CECAFA Cup, the 2018 and 2020 African Nations Championships, and the world cup qualifications in 2022 He achieved 5 championship titles at Rwanda and was awarded player of the year. He is the captain of APR FC.

== Career ==
On 9 September 2023, Manishimwe joined the Algerian Club USM Khenchela.
