= Hamza Ziad =

Algerian footballer (born 1988)

Personal information
- Full name: Hamza Ziad
- Date of birth: 29 February 1988 (age 38)
- Place of birth: Batna, Algeria
- Position: Midfielder

Team information
- Current team: MSP Batna
- Number: 6

Senior career*
Years	Team	Apps	(Gls)
2008–2011	MSP Batna	28	(2)
2011–2013	JS Kabylie	31	(0)
2013–2014	CA Batna	9	(0)
2014	CS Constantine	9	(0)
2014–2016	CRB Aïn Fakroun	37	(5)
2016	RC Arbaâ	12	(0)
2017–2019	CA Bordj Bou Arréridj	60	(8)
2019–2021	AS Aïn M'lila	42	(1)
2021–2023	USM Khenchela	20	(0)
2023–2024	ES Mostaganem		
2024–2025	GC Mascara		
2025–	MSP Batna	2	(0)
- * Club domestic league appearances and goals as of 13 November 2025

Hamza Ziad (Arabic: حمزة زياد; born 29 February 1988) is an Algerian professional footballer. He currently plays as a midfielder for MSP Batna.

== Club career ==
On 20 June 2011, Ziad signed a two-year contract with JS Kabylie.
