= Chouaib Debbih =

Algerian footballer (born 1993)

Personal information
- Full name: Chouaib Debbih
- Date of birth: January 1, 1993 (age 33)
- Place of birth: Aïn M'lila, Algeria
- Height: 1.82 m (6 ft 0 in)
- Position: Midfielder

Team information
- Current team: US Biskra
- Number: 10

Youth career
- AS Aïn M'lila

Senior career*
Years	Team	Apps	(Gls)
2011–2012	AS Aïn M'lila		
2012–2015	CA Batna		
2015	CRB Aïn Fakroun		
2016	A Bou Saâda		
2016–2018	AS Aïn M'lila		
2018–2019	ES Setif	6	(0)
2019–2021	AS Aïn M'lila	52	(3)
2021–2022	CS Constantine	25	(3)
2022–2024	MC Alger	20	(3)
2024–2025	USM Khenchela	39	(2)
2025–	US Biskra	28	(4)

International career^{‡}
2021–	Algeria A'	4	(0)
- * Club domestic league appearances and goals as of 27 July 2026 ‡ National team caps and goals as of 9 June 2022

Chouaib Debbih (Arabic: شعيب ذبيح; born January 1, 1993) is an Algerian footballer who plays for US Biskra.

== Career ==
In 2018, Debbih signed a contract with ES Setif. In 2021, he signed a contract with CS Constantine. In 2022, Chouaib Debbih signed a contract with MC Alger. On 5 February 2024, he joined USM Khenchela. In 2025, he joined US Biskra.
