= Maxwell Baakoh =

Ivorian footballer

Personal information
- Full name: Maxwell Baakoh
- Date of birth: 8 October 1995 (age 31)
- Place of birth: Takoradi, Ghana
- Height: 1.63 m (5 ft 4 in)
- Position: Midfielder

Youth career
- –2017: Wa All Stars FC

Senior career*
Years	Team	Apps	(Gls)
2017–2018	Wa All Stars FC	–	(–)
2018	Karela United	–	(–)
2018–2020	Asante Kotoko	–	(–)
2020–2021	Ceramica Cleopatra	11	(0)
2021–2022	Al-Madina	–	(–)
2022	Sahab SC	–	(–)
2022–2024	USM Khenchela	37	(9)
2024–2026	MC Oran	30	(2)
- * Club domestic league appearances and goals as of 18 January 2026

Maxwell Baakoh (born 8 October 1995) is a Ghanaian professional footballer who plays as a midfielder.
