= Ayobami Junior =

Nigeria Professional Footballer

Personal information
- Full name: Abiodun Ayobami
- Date of birth: 24 December 1998 (age 27)
- Place of birth: Lagos, Nigeria
- Position: Midfielder

Team information
- Current team: USM Khenchela
- Number: 24

Senior career*
Years	Team	Apps	(Gls)
2020	Kano Pillars	0	(0)
2021–2023	Kwara United	50	(2)
2023–2026	Shooting Stars	66	(2)
2026-	USM Khenchela	0	(0)

International career^{‡}
2026–	Nigeria	1	(0)
- * Club domestic league appearances and goals as of 27 July 2026 ‡ National team caps and goals as of 30 May 2026

Ayobami Junior (born 24 December 1998) is a Nigerian professional footballer who plays as a midfielder for Algerian Ligue Professionnelle 1 club USM Khenchela and the Nigeria national team.

== Club career ==
Ayobami Junior has featured Kano Pillars and Kwara United. In the 2023/2024 season, he also played for the Oluyole Warriors. He currently plays for the Shooting Stars in the Nigeria Premier Football League (NPFL) after plying his trade abroad.

In July 2026, he joined Algerian club USM Khenchela.

== International career ==
In 2026, Ayobami received his first call-up to the Nigeria national team for the Unity Cup tournament in London by Eric Chelle. He made his debut as a substitution for Alhassan Ibrahim against Zimbabwe. He was also praised by Nigeria head coach Eric Chelle in the buildup to the Unity Cup tournament during the match between Shooting Stars and Nasarawa United.
