= Oussama Litim =

Algerian footballer (born 1990)

Personal information
- Date of birth: 3 June 1990 (age 36)
- Place of birth: Bouhmama, Algeria
- Height: 1.85 m (6 ft 1 in)
- Position: Goalkeeper

Team information
- Current team: USM Khenchela
- Number: 16

Youth career
- –: NRB Bouhmama

Senior career*
Years	Team	Apps	(Gls)
2009–2013	MSP Batna		
2013–2016	USM Blida		
2016–2018	DRB Tadjenanet	45	(0)
2018–2021	MC Oran	66	(0)
2021	Al-Ain	0	(0)
2021–2024	MC Alger	44	(0)
2024–	USM Khenchela	47	(0)

International career^{‡}
2021–	Algeria A'	0	(0)
- * Club domestic league appearances and goals as of 5 June 2026 ‡ National team caps and goals as of 19 June 2021

Oussama Litim (Arabic: أسامة ليتيم, born 3 June 1990) is an Algerian professional footballer who plays as a goalkeeper for USM Khenchela.

== Career ==
=== Club career ===
Oussama Litim start his career with NRB Bouhmama. After moving to MSP Batna, USM Blida and DRB Tadjenanet, he signed with MC Oran on 2018.

On 3 September 2021, Litim joined Saudi Arabian club Al-Ain. After less than a month, he left the Saudi team.

=== International career ===
Litim was called up to represent the senior Algeria A' national football team for a friendly game on 17 June 2021 against Libera.

== Honours ==
=== Clubs ===
MSP Batna

- Algerian Ligue Professionnelle 2 (1): 2014–15
