= Ahmida Zenasni =

Algerian footballer (born 1993)

Personal information
- Date of birth: 10 July 1993 (age 33)
- Place of birth: Ghazaouet, Algeria
- Position: Midfielder

Team information
- Current team: USM Khenchela
- Number: 6

Senior career*
Years	Team	Apps	(Gls)
2012–2013	WA Tlemcen	2	(0)
2016–2017	USM Bel-Abbès	15	(0)
2017–2018	CR Belouizdad	27	(0)
2018	JS Saoura	5	(0)
2019–2020	JSM Béjaïa	0	(0)
2020–2022	WA Tlemcen	49	(0)
2022–2024	ASO Chlef	58	(0)
2024-	USM Khenchela	45	(0)
- * Club domestic league appearances and goals as of 5 June 2026

Ahmida Zenasni (Arabic: حميدة زناسني; born 10 July 1993) is an Algerian footballer who plays as a defender for USM Khenchela in the Algerian Ligue Professionnelle 1.

== Career ==
On 13 July 2017, he signed for CR Belouizdad. On 11 January 2019, he joined JSM Béjaïa. On 25 February 2022, he signed for ASO Chlef. On 5 August 2024, he joined USM Khenchela.
