= Algérie Télécom =

Algerian telecommunications company

- Native name: إتصالات الجزائر
- Type: Joint-stock company
- Genre: Telecommunications operator
- Founded: April 10, 2003; 23 years ago
- Headquarters: Route Nationale n°05 - Cinq Maisons, 16130, Mohammedia, Algiers, Algeria
- Area served: Algeria
- Key people: Adel Bentoumi (CEO)
- Owner: Government of Algeria
- Number of employees: 21,408
- Parent: Télécom Algérie Groupe
- Website: www.algerietelecom.dz

Algeria Telecommunications Corporation (Arabic: إتصالات الجزائر, romanized: ʾIttiṣālāt al-Ǧazāʾir, French: Algérie Télécom) is a state-owned and the main telecommunications company in Algeria. It is the sole operator of the fixed telephony network and broadband internet in the country.

Algérie Télécom is a subsidiary of Télécom Algérie Groupe after the latter's creation in 2017.

== Activities ==
It introduced optical fiber since February 2018 to provide very high speed access.

They mainly use the traditional fixed line, possibly equipped with ADSL, and are marketed under the brands of Algérie Télécom, fixed telephony and low-speed Internet (by modem), high-speed (by ADSL) and very high-speed (by optical fiber).

On September 30, 2022, the number of fixed Internet subscribers (ADSL, FTTH and 4G LTE/Wimax) was 4.46 million (4.02 million on September 30, 2021).

Among the 4.46 million fixed internet subscribers, 2.75 million subscribed to broadband internet (ADSL), 1.35 million to fixed 4G LTE, 353,039 to optical fiber to the home (FTTH) and 320 to WiMAX technology.

Among the overall number of fixed Internet subscribers (4.46 million), 4.35 million were residential subscribers and 110,417 business subscribers. As for subscribers to the various fixed Internet offers, 85.07% had speeds between 10 and 20 Megas, 14.69% between 20 and 50 Megas and 0.19% between 50 and 100 Megas.

In October 2021, Algérie Télécom announced that it had increased the internet speed from 2 Mbps to 10 Mbps, which becomes the minimum speed in Algeria.

On November 14, 2022, Algérie Télécom reveals a new Idoom VDSL offer allowing customers and their families to take full advantage of a very high speed connection of up to 50 megabytes.

On November 15, 2022, Algérie Télécom announces the launch of its new range of IDOOM Fiber offers on higher speed levels, up to 300 MB. These new offers, intended for residential customers, are as follows:

- The customer with an internet subscription up to 100 MB will systematically benefit from an increase in speed up to 300 MB at the same rate, i.e. 6999 DA;
- The customer with an internet subscription up to 50 MB will systematically benefit from an increase in speed up to 100 MB at the same rate, i.e. 3599 DA;
- The price of the debit level up to 50 MB now goes to 2999 DA, instead of 3599 DA, i.e. a price reduction of more than 16%;
- A new level of debit up to 200 MB enriches the range of offers available, with an exceptional price of 4999 DA.

On December 6, 2022, Algérie Télécom launches, with the contribution of the Algerian Center for Cinema Development (CADC), and the National Center for Cinematography and Audio-visual (CNCA), its new video on demand service called "Dzair Play".

== Network coverage ==
=== Optical fiber ===
In 2017, Algérie Télécom claimed to have more than 140,000 km (87,000 mi) of optical fiber network.

As of December 31, 2021, nearly 200,000 km (120,000 mi) of fiber optic cables had been deployed, according to the CEO of Groupe Télécom Algérie, Khaled Zarat.

== Corporate affairs ==
=== Management ===
- Messaoud Chettih (2000-2002)
- Brahim Ouaret (2002-2004)
- Khireddine Slimane (2004-2006)
- Mouloud Djaziri (2006-2008)
- Moussa Benhamadi (2008-2010)
- Mohamed Dabouz (2010-2012)
- Azouaou Mahmel (2012-2016)
- Mohamed Sbaa (April–November 2016)
- Tayeb Kebbal (2016-2017)
- Adel Khemane (2017-2019)
- Mohamed Anouar Benabdelouahad (2019-2020)
- Hocine Helouane (September 2020 - February 2022)
- Adel Bentoumi (since February 2022)
