= Nabil Saâdou =

Algerian footballer (born 1990)

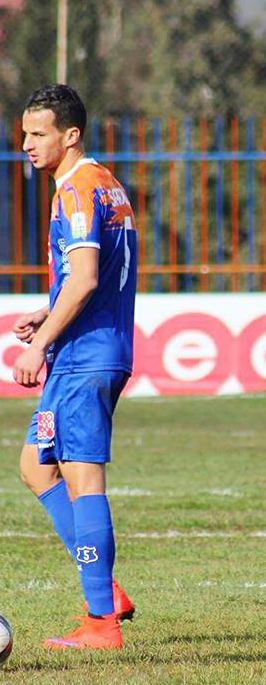

Personal information
- Full name: Nabil Saâdou
- Date of birth: 7 March 1990 (age 36)
- Place of birth: Beni Messous, Algiers
- Height: 1.83 m (6 ft 0 in)
- Position: Defender

Team information
- Current team: JSM Skikda
- Number: 5

Youth career
- 2010–2015: JSM Chéraga

Senior career*
Years	Team	Apps	(Gls)
2014–2015	JSM Chéraga		
2015–2017	O Médéa	55	(9)
2017–2020	JS Kabylie	41	(1)
2020–2022	MC Alger	25	(1)
2022	Al-Jabalain	15	(0)
2022–2025	USM Khenchela	53	(3)
2025–2026	USM El Harrach		
2026–	JSM Skikda		
- * Club domestic league appearances and goals as of 22 August 2026

Nabil Saâdou (Arabic: نبيل سعدو; born 7 March 1990) is an Algerian footballer who plays for JSM Skikda.

== Career ==
In June 2017, Saâdou joined JS Kabylie. On 24 September 2020, he signed for MC Alger. On 19 January 2022, Saâdou joined Saudi Arabian club Al-Jabalain. In August 2022, he signed for USM Khenchela. In 2025, Saâdou joined USM El Harrach. On 21 August 2026, he joined JSM Skikda.
