= Abdelhakim Sameur =

Algerian footballer (born 1990)

Personal information
- Full name: Abdelhakim Sameur
- Date of birth: 12 November 1990 (age 35)
- Place of birth: Khenchela, Algeria
- Height: 1.79 m (5 ft 10 1/2 in)
- Position: Midfielder

Team information
- Current team: USM Khenchela
- Number: 8

Senior career*
Years	Team	Apps	(Gls)
–2010	USM Khenchela		
2010–2013	WA Tlemcen	77	(17)
2013–2017	CS Constantine	99	(10)
2017–2018	CR Belouizdad	8	(0)
2018–2019	Olympique de Médéa	39	(6)
2019–2020	US Biskra	18	(0)
2022–	USM Khenchela	95	(7)
- * Club domestic league appearances and goals as of 5 June 2026

Abdelhakim Sameur (Arabic: عبد الحكيم سامر; born 12 November 1990) is an Algerian football player. He currently plays for USM Khenchela in the Algerian Ligue Professionnelle 1.
