= Sofiane Bayazid =

Algerian footballer (born 1996)

Personal information
- Date of birth: November 16, 1996 (age 29)
- Place of birth: Nezla, Algeria
- Height: 1.81 m (5 ft 11 in)
- Position: Striker

Team information
- Current team: MC Alger
- Number: 7

Senior career*
Years	Team	Apps	(Gls)
2017–2018	NRB Touggourt		
2018–2020	AS Khroub	9	(0)
2020–2023	USM Khenchela	57	(29)
2023–	MC Alger	67	(17)

International career^{‡}
2022–	Algeria A'	2	(0)
- * Club domestic league appearances and goals as of 5 June 2026 ‡ National team caps and goals as of 14 November 2022

Sofiane Bayazid (Arabic: سفيان بايزيد; born November 16, 1996) is an Algerian footballer who plays as a striker for MC Alger in the Algerian Ligue Professionnelle 1.

== Career ==
In July 2023, he joined MC Alger.

== International career ==
On November 2, 2022, he made his Algeria A' national team debut in a friendly match against Niger, setting up the 2nd goal in a 2–0 win.
