= Tosin Omoyele =

Nigerian footballer (born 1996)

Personal information
- Full name: Tosin Omoyele
- Date of birth: August 3, 1996 (age 30)
- Place of birth: Lagos State, Nigeria
- Height: 1.80 m (5 ft 11 in)
- Position: Striker

Team information
- Current team: Saham Club
- Number: 35

Youth career
- 2013–2015: COD United

Senior career*
| Years | Team | Apps | (Gls) |
| 2015–2016 | COD United | 10 | (6) |
| 2016–2017 | Osun United | 30 | (17) |
| 2017–2018 | Plateau United | 28 | (9) |
| 2018–2019 | Nogoom FC | 14 | (2) |
| 2019–2020 | Plateau United | 4 | (2) |
| 2020–2022 | Enyimba FC | 32 | (7) |
| 2022–2024 | USM Khenchela | 55 | (11) |
| 2024–2026 | CS Constantine | 27 | (5) |
| 2026– | Saham Club | 0 | (0) |

International career
| 2017– | Nigeria | 2 | (0) |
- * Club domestic league appearances and goals as of 5 June 2026

Tosin Omoyele (born 3 August 1996) is a Nigerian footballer who plays as a striker for Oman Professional League club Saham Club.

== Career ==
He started his career at City of David (COD) academy in 2012 and made his first-team debut for COD's first team in 2015. Omoyele spent a season there scoring six goals from 10 matches.

He moved to Osun United F.C. the following season where he scored 17 goals and five assists in 30 games for the Oshogbo-based side. He moved to Plateau United FC in 2017, where he scored nine goals and 10 assists in 28 games before moving to Egypt with Nogoom FC, and then back to Plateau United the following season.

In 2022, he joined Enyimba Football Club of Aba. In 2022, he signed a contract with USM Khenchela.

== Honours ==
Winners Medal – Nationwide League with C.O.D United 2014/2015

Winners Medal – Osun State FA Cup 2017

Highest Goal Scorer - Nigeria National League 2017

Winners Medal – Plateau State FA 2018

National Team

- 2018 CHAN Team (Nigeria), part of the 30 man squad called up
- WAFU Tournament, 2018
- CHAN 2021 Qualifiers
