= Amar Hamam Stadium =

Football stadium in Khenchela, Algeria

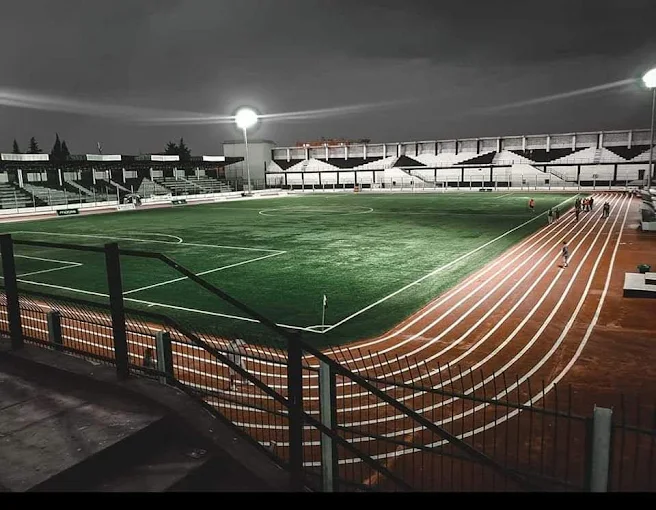
- Interactive map of Amar Hamam Stadium
- Location: Khenchela, Algeria
- Coordinates: 35.4284°N 7.1465°E
- Owner: APC of Khenchela
- Capacity: 8,000
- Surface: Artificial turf

Tenant
- USM Khenchela

Amar Hamam Stadium (Arabic: ملعب عمار حمام) is a football stadium in Khenchela, Algeria. The stadium holds 8,000 people. It serves as the home ground for USM Khenchela which plays in Algerian Ligue Professionnelle 1.
