= USM Khenchela =

Association football club in Algeria

- Full name: Union sportive Madinet Khenchela
- Nickname: Lions des Aurés - Ciskaoua - Les bagnards
- Founded: July 28, 1943; 83 years ago (as Union sportive Madinet Khenchela)
- Ground: Amar Hamam Stadium
- Capacity: 8,000
- Owner: Algérie Télécom
- President: Walid Boukrouma
- League: Ligue 1
- 2025–26: Ligue 1, 7th of 16
Home colours	Away colours	Third colours

Union Sportive Madinet Khenchela (Arabic: الإتحاد الرياضي لمدينة خنشلة), known as USM Khenchela or simply USMK, is an Algerian professional football club based in Khenchela. The club was founded in 1943 and its colours are white and black. Their home stadium, Hammam Ammar Stadium, has a capacity of 8,000 spectators. The club is currently playing in the Algerian Ligue Professionnelle 1.

== History ==
In 1970–71 Algerian Cup semi-finals in Khenchela against USM Alger who was not welcomed because of a word used by their supporters which is that Khenchela is “Shawiya” a term that has been misinterpreted and they prepared a hostile reception, and the match lasted four hours due to the storming to the stadium several times by the supporters. After the end of the match USM Alger players who were accompanied by a handful of fans, remained locked in the dressing rooms until midnight and after the intervention of a Gendarmerie brigade sent from Batna, then the Algerian Football Federation at that time punished the two clubs by playing 50 kilometers away from its stadium for one year. Khenchela saw the birth of another club that became known thanks to its good performances during the 1990s, at a time when USM Khenchela was struggling in the lower divisions, Ittihad Riadhi Baladiat Khenchela. created in 1985, Subsequently, the authorities decided to merge these two clubs into one, but the project fell through and a few years later IRBK ended up disappearing from the football scene after 28 years of existence.

The club was promoted for the 2010–11 season of the newly created Championnat National de Football Amateur due to the professionalisation of the first two divisions in Algeria.

On August 5, 2020, USM Khenchela were promoted to the Algerian Ligue 2.

=== Promotion to Ligue 1 for the first time ===
On May 21, 2022, USM Khenchela were promoted to the Algerian Ligue Professionnelle 1 returns to the national elite that it left almost 50 years ago. The Ciskaoua will thus once again taste the sensations of the Ligue 1 where they had played for two seasons at the beginning of the 1970s. On February 2, 2023, an agreement was signed between Groupe Cosider and USM Khenchela, Under this agreement which covers a renewable year, the club will benefit from financial support during the 2022–23 sports season. This agreement initialed in the presence of the Wali of Khenchela, aims underlined the CEO of Cosider to support the evolution of the club through a sponsorship formula, under which Groupe Cosider will financially support all of the activities of USM Khenchela.

During the visit of the President of the Republic Abdelmadjid Tebboune on May 31, 2024, to Khenchela, he promised the leaders and fans of USM Khenchela to find a lessor capable of taking charge of L'USMK. The Algerian public telecommunications company Algérie Télécom, will apparently be the new owner of USM Khenchela, according to a post published on the club's official page. The club's president, Walid Boukrouma, said that "preliminary discussions addressing the aspects of the transfer of ownership of the club to this national company have already been initiated with its CEO, stressing that the realization of this acquisition will not happen overnight. It will take a few months to finalize all the necessary administrative procedures.

On August 1, 2024, Algérie Télécom and Union Sportive Madinet Khenchela have signed a partnership agreement, making Algérie Télécom the official sponsor. The signing ceremony took place at the headquarters of the General Directorate of Algérie Télécom in Algiers, in the presence of the Chairman and CEO of Algérie Télécom and the President of USM Khenchela Walid Boukrouma. Knowing that Algérie Télécom has started procedures to buy the club, this partnership is part of a global approach aimed at supporting the club in the development and strengthening of its capacities for the 2024–25 season.

On 20 January 2026, Algérie Télécom announced its takeover of the club.

== Players ==
Algerian teams are limited to four foreign players. The squad list includes only the principal nationality of each player;

=== Current squad ===
As of 31 August 2026 Note: Flags indicate national team as defined under FIFA eligibility rules; some limited exceptions apply. Players may hold more than one non-FIFA nationality.

No.	Pos.	Nation	Player
1	GK	ALG	Hatem Bencheikh El Fegoun
3	DF	ALG	Nabil Lamara
4	DF	ALG	Imadeddine Boubekeur
5	DF	ALG	Youcef Douar
6	MF	ALG	Ahmida Zenasni
7	FW	ALG	Abdelhak Askar
8	MF	ALG	Abdelhakim Sameur
9	FW	SEN	Almamy Fall
10	MF	ALG	Mehdi Boukassi
11	MF	ALG	Adem Chaibi
12	DF	ALG	Zineddine Meddour
14	MF	CIV	Issouf Kamara
15	FW	ALG	Massinissa Nezla

No.	Pos.	Nation	Player
16	GK	ALG	Oussama Litim (captain)
17	MF	ALG	Sid Ahmed Matallah
18	DF	ALG	Anouar Boukhalfa
19	DF	ALG	Abdelhamid Dris
21	DF	ALG	Ibrahim Hachoud
22	MF	ALG	Necer Benzid
23	FW	ALG	Faik Amrane
24	MF	NGR	Ayobami Junior
25	MF	ALG	Aymen Bendaoud
27	DF	ALG	Zakaria Zaitri
29	FW	GUI	Alhassane Camara
30	GK	ALG	Yasser Zitouni

== Personnel ==
=== Current technical staff ===
Position	Staff
Head coach	
Assistant coach	
Goalkeeping coach	(Tunisia) Rabie Bouazzi
Fitness coach	(Algeria) Ahmed Khebbeb

== Statistics ==
=== Recent seasons ===
Season	League									Cup	Other	Africa	Top goalscorer(s) (Note: Goals in all competitions (Algerian Ligue Professionnelle 1, Algerian Cup, League Cup, African and Super Cup) are counted.)		Ref.
Season	Division	Pos	Pts	P	W	D	L	GF	GA	Cup	Other	Africa	Name	Goals	
1962–63	Critérium d'Honneur	2nd	42	18	10	4	4			Unknown					
1963–64	Division d'Honneur	3rd		14						Round of 16					
1964–65	Division d'Honneur	11th		26						Round of 32					
1965–66	Division d'Honneur	7th		30						Round of 32					
1966–67	Division d'Honneur									Unknown					
1967–68	Division d'Honneur	1st								Unknown					
1968–69	Nationale II	6th	42	22	6	8	8	25	29	Round of 64					
1969–70	Nationale II	6th	44	22	7	8	7	27	27	Round of 32					
1970–71	Nationale II	3rd	51	24	10	7	7	24	20	Semi-finals					
1971–72	Nationale II									Unknown					
1972–73	National II	3rd	60	26	14	6	6	44	20	Unknown					
1973–74	National II	1st	51	22	15	6	1	35	11	Unknown					
1974–75	Nationale I	11th	57	30	11	5	14	24	40	Round of 64					
1975–76	Nationale I	14th	47	30	4	9	17	28	53	Round of 16					
1976–77	Nationale II	2nd	26							Round of 16					
1977–78	Division 2	2nd	26							Unknown					
1978–79	National II	2nd	26							Unknown					
1979–80	National II	9th	43	22	5	11	6	18	21	Round of 32					
2009–10	Inter-régions	5th	49	30	14	7	9	39	28	Round of 16					
2010–11	DNA	12th	23	26	5	8	13	18	33	Last regional round					
2011–12	DNA	3rd	44	26	13	5	8	32	28	Penultimate; Regional Round					
2012–13	DNA	8th	37	26	10	7	9	28	28	Unknown					
2013–14	DNA	7th	40	30	12	4	14	35	44	Last regional round					
2014–15	DNA	10th	36	30	8	12	10	23	26	Last regional round					
2015–16	DNA	9th	37	30	10	7	13	33	40	Penultimate; Regional Round					
2016–17	DNA	6th	39	30	10	9	11	39	37	Round of 32					
2017–18	DNA	2nd	50	30	14	8	8	36	25	Round of 64					
2018–19	DNA	2nd	62	30	15	8	4	38	20	Round of 32					
2019–20	DNA (Note: On March 15, 2020, the Ministry of Youth and Sports decided to stop the season due to the COVID-19 pandemic in Algeria, Then it was canceled with the rise of the first eight teams to the Ligue 2 and the relegation was cancelled.)	6th	36	24	9	9	6	28	19	Round of 64					
2020–21	Ligue 2	4th	38	22	10	8	4	26	19	Not played					
2021–22	Ligue 2	1st	67	30	19	10	1	60	22	Not played			Sofiane Bayazid	16	
2022–23	Ligue 1	8th	42	30	12	6	12	29	29	Round of 16			Sofiane Bayazid	14	
2023–24	Ligue 1	10th	39	30	11	6	13	33	39	Round of 16			Tosin Omoyele	10	
2024–25	Ligue 1	9th	40	30	11	7	12	28	38	Round of 64			Hamid Djaouchi	9	
