= Khenchela =

Khenchela: خنشلة (Arabic); Tixencelt (Berber languages)
- City
- City of Khenchela
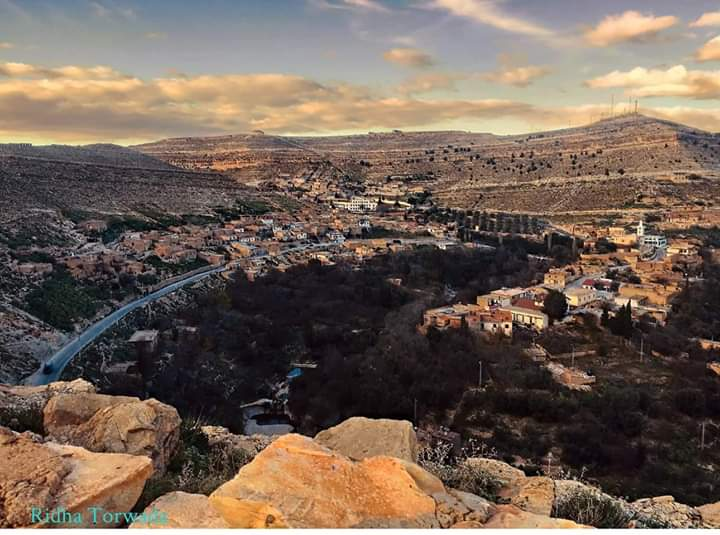
- View of the city

- Location of Khenchela within Khenchela Province

- Location of Khenchela within Algeria
- Coordinates: 35°25′N 7°8′E
- Country: Algeria
- Province: Khenchela
- District: Khenchela

Government
  - PMA Seats: 33
- Elevation: 1,200 m (3,900 ft)

Population (2008 census)
  - Total: 114,472
- Time zone: UTC+01 (CET)
- Postal code: 40000
- ONS code: 4001
- Climate: Csb

Khenchela (Arabic: خنشلة; Berber languages: Tixencelt; anciently Mascula) is the capital city of the administrative Khenchela Province (Wilaya), in the north east of Algeria. Situated in the Aures Mountains, 1200 m above sea level. The city is mainly populated by Berber Chaouis.

== History ==
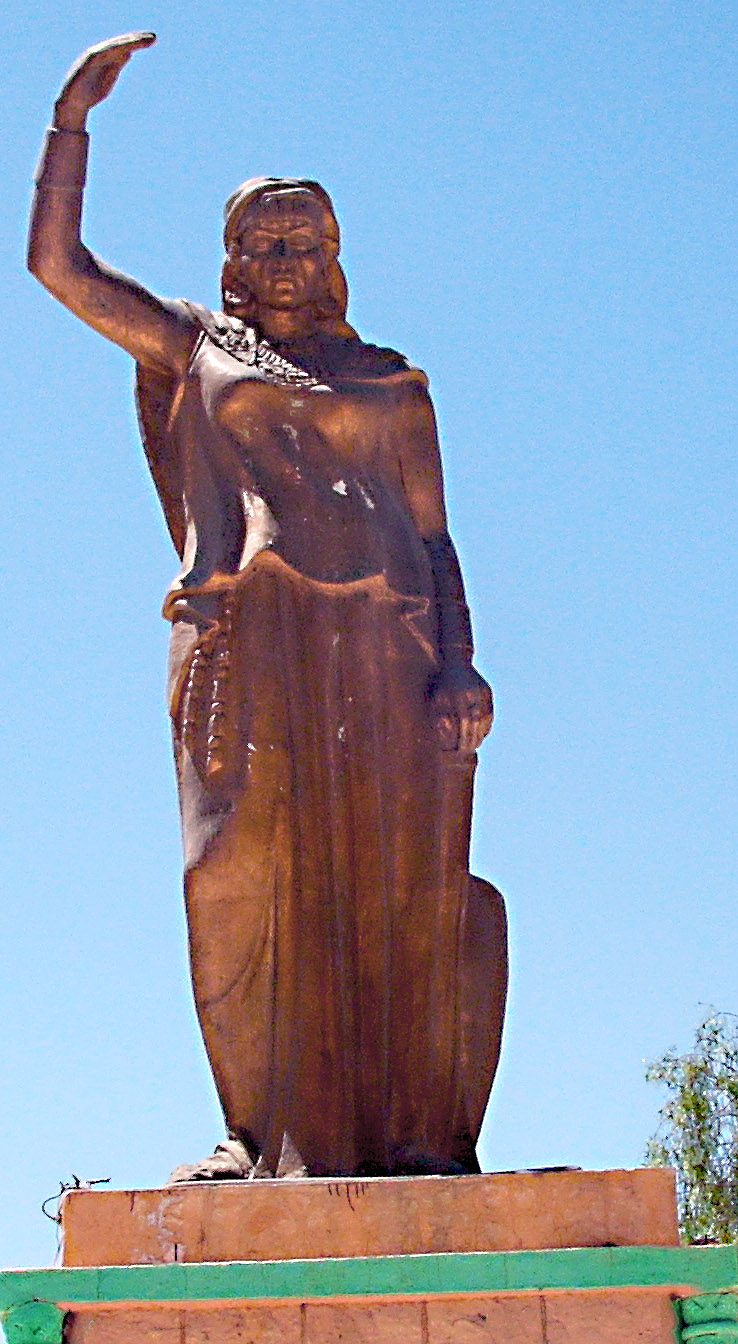
Statue of Queen Kahina in Baghai, Khenchela province

Kahina led a decades long war against the Islamic conquest in the 7th century and built a castle here. During the Barbary period there were many inter-town conflicts over water resources.

The French army reached Khenchela in 1850 after heavy fighting and strenuous resistance and set up a military administration. Organization of work on the city was undertaken. The first French settlers were allowed from 1878. Farms and plantations were built. In the process, farmers cleared a path for vegetation at the valley of Wadi Boughegal which in turn gave birth to natural grasslands, allowing cattle breeding and feeding the population with fresh dairy products.

In October 1905, the inauguration of the meter-gauge railway line from Aïn Beïda to Khenchela provided daily service with the north of the country. Military administration lasted until 1912.

In 1982, a mass grave containing more than 1200 corpses from the war of Algeria was discovered. It would be the largest ever discovered in Algeria. The authorities and the Algerian press attributed it to the French army, while others disputed this and suggested the victims may have been French harkis.

== Geography ==
=== Climate ===
Located in the Aurès Mountains (part of the Atlas Mountains), at 1,200 metres (3,900 ft) above sea level, Khenchela has warm-summer Mediterranean climate (Köppen climate classification Csb), with an average annual precipitation of 446 millimetres (17.6 in). Summers are warm and dry and winters are chilly and wetter, with the possibility of snowfall.

This is one of the coldest cities in Algeria.

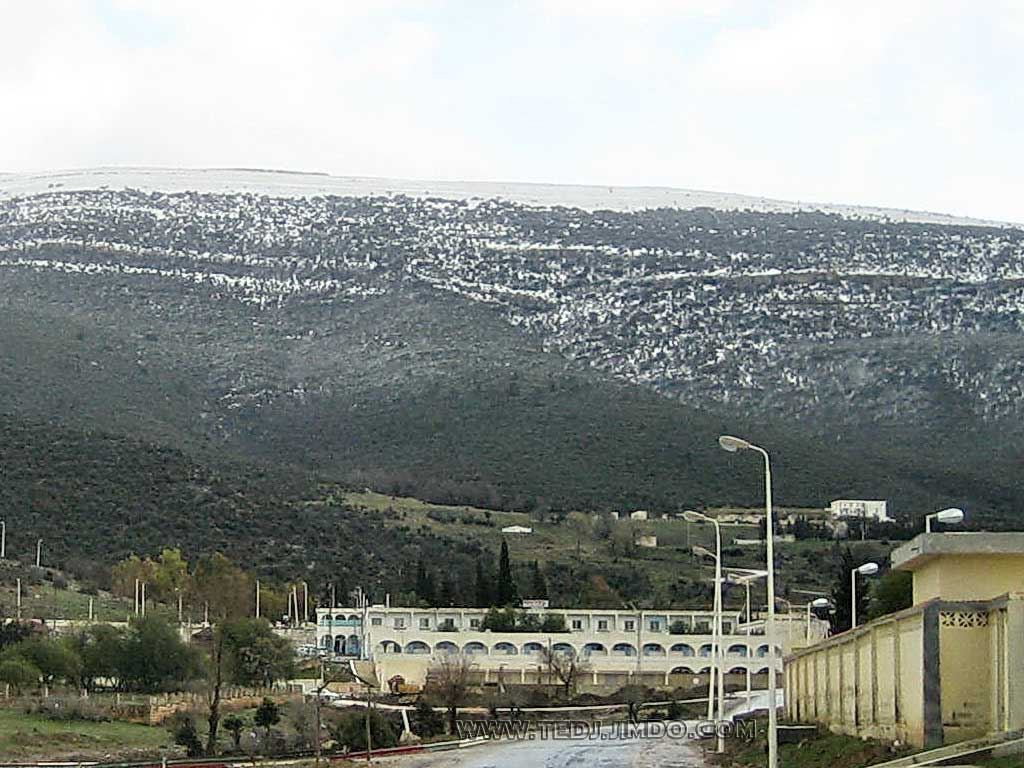
Khenchela in winter

Climate data for Khenchela
Month	Jan	Feb	Mar	Apr	May	Jun	Jul	Aug	Sep	Oct	Nov	Dec	Year
Mean daily maximum °C (°F)	9.0 (48.2)	10.6 (51.1)	13.9 (57.0)	17.6 (63.7)	21.2 (70.2)	26.6 (79.9)	30.1 (86.2)	29.4 (84.9)	25.7 (78.3)	19.7 (67.5)	14.5 (58.1)	10.2 (50.4)	19.0 (66.3)
Mean daily minimum °C (°F)	−0.5 (31.1)	0.4 (32.7)	2.0 (35.6)	4.1 (39.4)	7.0 (44.6)	11.1 (52.0)	13.1 (55.6)	13.1 (55.6)	11.7 (53.1)	7.8 (46.0)	4.1 (39.4)	0.7 (33.3)	6.2 (43.2)
Average precipitation mm (inches)	43 (1.7)	44 (1.7)	63 (2.5)	40 (1.6)	49 (1.9)	25 (1.0)	12 (0.5)	17 (0.7)	32 (1.3)	37 (1.5)	46 (1.8)	38 (1.5)	446 (17.7)
Source: Climate-data.org

== Demographics ==
Since the 20th century, Khenchela's population has grown particularly fast: 12 000 inhabitants in 1954, 28,000 in 1962, 70,000 in 1987 and 87,196 in 2002. This increase is partly explained by population displacement during the war in Algeria, the area being a refuge for resistance fighters. This has posed and continues to pose planning problems (housing, water, sewer, electricity).

== Sports ==
USM Khenchela is the most well-known sports club from the city. It currently plays in the Ligue 1, the first tier of the Algerian football pyramid, and hosts its games in Amar Hamam Stadium.

== Education ==
- Abbes Laghrour University
