= 2025–26 JS Kabylie season =

JS Kabylie
2025–26 season
- Owner: ATM Mobilis
- President: El Hadi Ould Ali (until 3 February 2026); Adel Boudedja (from 3 February 2026)
- Head coach: Josef Zinnbauer (until 19 March 2026); Rabah Bensafi (from 21 march 2026)
- Stadium: Hocine Aït Ahmed Stadium
- Ligue 1: 5th
- Algerian Cup: Round of 32
- Champions League: Group stage
- Top goalscorer: League: Aymen Mahious (14); All: Aymen Mahious (15)
- Average home league attendance: 30,684
- Biggest win: JS Kabylie 7–0 MB Hassi Messaoud
- Biggest defeat: Al Ahly 4–1 JS Kabylie
Home colours	Away colours

The 2025–26 season, was JS Kabylie's 57th consecutive season in the top flight of Algerian football. In addition to the domestic league, JS Kabylie participated in the Algerian Cup and the Champions League. The Algerian Professional Football League (LFP) officially released the calendar for the 2025–26 Ligue 1 Mobilis season on July 10, 2025.

== Squad list ==
Players and squad numbers last updated on 31 January 2026.
Note: Flags indicate national team as has been defined under FIFA eligibility rules. Players may hold more than one non-FIFA nationality.

No.	Nat.	Name	Position	Date of birth (age)	Signed from
Goalkeepers
16	(Algeria)	Gaya Merbah	GK	22 July 1994 (aged 31)	(Morocco) IR Tanger
21	(Algeria)	Mohamed Idir Hadid	GK	26 April 2002 (aged 23)	(Algeria) Reserve team
22	(Algeria)	Seif Benrabah	GK	23 March 2003 (aged 22)	(Algeria) Reserve team
Defenders
2	(Algeria)	Fares Nechat Djabri	RB	25 May 2001 (aged 24)	(Algeria) Reserve team
3	(Algeria)	Chahine Bellaouel	CB	27 December 2000 (aged 24)	(Algeria) CS Constantine
4	(Algeria)	Mostapha Bott	CB	21 July 2004 (aged 21)	(Algeria) Reserve team
5	(Algeria)	Zineddine Belaïd	CB	20 March 1999 (aged 26)	(Belgium) Sint-Truiden
13	(Algeria)	Oussama Benatia	RB	14 August 2005 (aged 20)	(Algeria) Reserve team
14	(Algeria)	Abdelhak Cherir	LB	11 July 2005 (aged 20)	(Algeria) MC Alger
17	(Algeria)	Mohamed Réda Hamidi	RB	8 June 2001 (aged 24)	(Algeria) Paradou AC
20	(Algeria)	Mohamed Amine Madani	CB	20 March 1992 (aged 33)	(Algeria) CS Constantine
24	(Algeria)	Chouaib Boulkaboul	LB	3 April 2001 (aged 24)	(Algeria) ES Mostaganem
26	(Algeria)	Ahmed Maâmeri	LB	25 June 1997 (aged 28)	(Algeria) CS Constantine
28	(Algeria)	Reda Benchaa	CB	12 March 2002 (aged 23)	(Kuwait) Kazma SC
Midfielders
10	(Algeria)	Ryad Boudebouz	AM	19 February 1990 (aged 35)	(Saudi Arabia) Ohod Club
12	(Ivory Coast)	Josaphat Arthur Bada	CM	7 August 2002 (aged 23)	(Tanzania) Singida
15	(Algeria)	Youcef Izem	CM	9 February 2007 (aged 18)	(Algeria) Reserve team
25	(Senegal)	Babacar Sarr	DM	24 July 1997 (aged 28)	(Tanzania) Simba
Forwards
7	(Angola)	Jaredi Teixeira	RW	11 November 1998 (aged 26)	(Angola) Petro Atlético
9	(Algeria)	Billel Messaoudi	ST	21 December 1997 (aged 27)	(Turkey) Bandırmaspor
11	(Algeria)	Lahlou Akhrib	RW	24 April 2005 (aged 20)	(Algeria) Reserve team
18	(Algeria)	Aymen Mahious	ST	15 September 1997 (aged 27)	(Algeria) CR Belouizdad
27	(Algeria)	Oualid Malki	ST	12 February 2004 (aged 21)	(Algeria) Reserve team
29	(Chad)	Célestin Ecua	LW	1 January 2002 (aged 23)	(Tanzania) Young Africans
30	(Algeria)	Islam Tichtich	RW	23 July 2006 (aged 19)	(Algeria) Reserve team

== Transfers ==
=== In ===
==== Summer ====
Date	Pos	Player	Moving from	Fee	Source
20 July 2025	DF	(Algeria) Mohamed Réda Hamidi	Paradou AC	Free transfer	
26 July 2025	FW	(Algeria) Aymen Mahious	(Switzerland) Yverdon-Sport	Free transfer	
27 July 2025	MF	(Ivory Coast) Josaphat Arthur Bada	(Tanzania) Singida	Free transfer	
30 July 2025	DF	(Algeria) Chahine Bellaouel	CS Constantine	Free transfer	
7 August 2025	DF	(Algeria) Oussama Benatia	MC Oran	Free transfer	
7 August 2025	DF	(Algeria) Hamza Mouali	MC Alger	Free transfer	
23 August 2025	CB	(Algeria) Zineddine Belaïd	(Belgium) Sint-Truiden	Undisclosed	
29 August 2025	ST	(Algeria) Billel Messaoudi	(Turkey) Bandırmaspor	Undisclosed	
30 August 2025	RW	(Algeria) Mehdi Merghem	USM Alger	Undisclosed	

==== Winter ====
Date	Pos	Player	Moving from	Fee	Source
22 January 2026	LB	(Algeria) Chouaib Boulkaboul	ES Mostaganem	Undisclosed	
22 January 2026	RW	(Angola) Jaredi Teixeira	(Angola) Petro Atlético	Undisclosed	
28 January 2026	LW	(Chad) Célestin Ecua	(Tanzania) Young Africans	Loan	

=== Out ===
==== Summer ====
Date	Pos	Player	Moving to	Fee	Source
26 July 2025	LW	(Algeria) Adem Redjem	(Egypt) Modern Sport	Free transfer	
2 August 2025	CB	(Algeria) Abdelhamid Driss	Unattached (Note: Driss joined CS Constantine on 4 August 2025.)	Free transfer (Released)	
9 August 2025	ST	(Algeria) Redouane Berkane	(Qatar) Al-Wakrah SC	670.000 €	
25 August 2025	RW	(Algeria) Kouceila Boualia	(Tunisia) ES Tunis	600.000 €	
30 August 2025	RW	(Russia) Ivan Ignatyev	(Russia) FC Orenburg	Undisclosed	

==== Winter ====
Date	Pos	Player	Moving to	Fee	Source
19 January 2026	CM	(Algeria) Mehdi Boudjemaa	Unattached	Free transfer (Released)	
25 January 2026	LW	(Algeria) Aimen Lahmeri	CS Constantine	Free transfer	
27 January 2026	LB	(Algeria) JS Saoura	Hamza Mouali	Loan	
25 January 2026	LW	(Algeria) Aimen Lahmeri	CS Constantine	Free transfer	
25 January 2026	RW	(Algeria) Mehdi Merghem	(France) SC Bastia	Undisclosed	

== Competitions ==
=== Overview ===
Competition	Record								Started round	Final position / round	First match	Last match
Competition	G	W	D	L	GF	GA	GD	Win %	Started round	Final position / round	First match	Last match
Ligue 1	30	11	12	7	40	31	+9	36.67	—N/a	5th	31 August 2025	5 June 2026
Algerian Cup	2	1	0	1	7	1	+6	50.00	Round of 64	Round of 32	4 December 2025	12 December 2025
Champions League	10	4	3	3	13	9	+4	40.00	First round	To be confirmed	20 September 2025	5 June 2026
Total	42	16	15	11	60	41	+19	38.10				

Updated to match played 5 June 2026
Source: Competitions

=== Ligue 1 ===
==== League table ====
Pos	Team	Pld	W	D	L	GF	GA	GD	Pts	Qualification or relegation
3	CR Belouizdad	30	14	11	5	47	24	+23	53	Qualification for CAF Confederation Cup
4	MC Oran	30	14	7	9	36	31	+5	49	
5	JS Kabylie	30	11	12	7	40	31	+9	45	
6	Olympique Akbou	30	12	9	9	34	31	+3	45	
7	USM Khenchela	30	12	8	10	37	37	0	44	

Source: lfp.dz
Rules for classification: 1) Points; 2) Head-to-head points; 3) Head-to-head goal difference; 4) First half goal difference; 5) First half total goals; 6) Fairplay ranking; 7) Playoff.

==== Results summary ====
Overall								Home						Away					
Pld	W	D	L	GF	GA	GD	Pts	W	D	L	GF	GA	GD	W	D	L	GF	GA	GD
29	10	12	7	40	31	+9	42	6	5	3	25	16	+9	4	7	4	15	15	0

Last updated: 5 June 2026.
Source: Competitive matches

==== Results by round ====
Round	1	2	3	4	5	6	7	8	9	10	11	12	13	14	15	16	17	18	19	20	21	22	23	24	25	26	27	28	29	30
Ground	H	A	H	A	H	H	A	H	A	H	A	H	A	H	A	A	H	A	H	A	A	H	A	H	A	H	A	H	A	H
Result	L	D	D	L	W	D	W	W	D	W	L	D	W	W	W	W	W	D	L	D	D	W	L	L	D	D	D	W	W	D
Position	13	12	12	14	14	13	10	7	9	6	6	7	9	8	5	2	2	3	4	5	7	6	7	7	7	8	7	7	5	5

Updated to match(es) played on 5 June 2026. Source: Competitive matches
A = Away; H = Home; W = Win; D = Draw; L = Loss

==== Matches ====
The league fixtures were announced on 31 July 2025.

All times are local, WAT (UTC+1).

Win Draw Loss Postponed

31 August 2025 Round 2	ES Ben Aknoun	1–1	JS Kabylie	Belouizdad
17:00	Saâd 45+6'	Soccerway; LFP	Boudebouz 37'	Stadium: 20 August 1955 Stadium; Referee: Mustapha Ghorbal; VAR: Yahia Dehar

6 September 2025 Round 3	JS Kabylie	0–0	Olympique Akbou	Tizi Ouzou
19:00		Soccerway; LFP		Stadium: Hocine Aït Ahmed Stadium; Referee: Anes Azrine; VAR: Redouane Allou

12 September 2025 Round 4	MC Oran	2–0	JS Kabylie	Bir El Djir
19:00	Aoudjane 53'; Boukholda 89' (pen.)	Soccerway; LFP		Stadium: Miloud Hadefi Stadium; Referee: Tahar Boudjemaa; VAR: Lahlou Benbraham

24 September 2025 Round 5	JS Kabylie	1–0	ES Mostaganem	Tizi Ouzou
19:00	Mahious 20'	Soccerway; LFP		Stadium: Hocine Aït Ahmed Stadium; Referee: Houssam Benyahia; VAR: Yahia Dehar

3 October 2025 Round 7	Paradou AC	1–2	JS Kabylie	Belouizdad
15:30	Ramdaoui 21'	Soccerway; LFP	Boudebouz 44'; Mahious 67'	Stadium: 20 August 1955 Stadium; Referee: Akram Mechairia; VAR: Youcef Taieb Bouderbal

21 October 2025 Round 8	JS Kabylie	1–0	USM Khenchela	Tizi Ouzou
19:00	Bott 87'	Soccerway; LFP		Stadium: Hocine Aït Ahmed Stadium; Referee: Mustapha Ghorbal; VAR: Ghada Mahat

29 October 2025 Round 9	JS Saoura	2–2	JS Kabylie	Béchar
16:00	Fettouhi 67'; Boutiche 81' (pen.)	Soccerway; LFP	Mahious 47'; Akacem 57' (o.g.)	Stadium: 20 August 1955 Stadium; Referee: Yahia Dahar

3 November 2025 Round 10	JS Kabylie	4–1	MC El Bayadh	Tizi Ouzou
17:45	Sarr 30'; Merghem 49'; Mahious 76'; Malki 83'	Soccerway; LFP	Belmiloud 63'	Stadium: Hocine Aït Ahmed Stadium; Referee: Anes Azrine

9 November 2025 Round 11	CS Constantine	1–0	JS Kabylie	Constantine
17:45	L'Ghoul 63'	Soccerway; LFP		Stadium: Chahid Hamlaoui Stadium; Referee: Houssam Benyahia

8 December 2025 Round 1	JS Kabylie	1–2	USM Alger	Tizi Ouzou
17:45	Mahious 61'	Soccerway; LFP	Khaldi 43'; Likonza 80'	Stadium: Hocine Aït Ahmed Stadium; Referee: Tahar Boudjemaa

19 December 2025 Round 13	ES Sétif	1–0	JS Kabylie	Sétif
18:00	Boubekeur 47'	Soccerway; LFP		Stadium: 8 May 1945 Stadium; Referee: Rafik Aouina

27 December 2025 Round 14	JS Kabylie	2–1	ASO Chlef	Tizi Ouzou
17:00	Boudebouz 15'; Messaoudi 50'	Soccerway; LFP	Feddal 19'	Stadium: Hocine Aït Ahmed Stadium; Referee: Mehdi Oukil

2 January 2026 Round 6	JS Kabylie	1–1	MC Alger	Tizi Ouzou
17:00	Madani 82' (pen.)	Soccerway; LFP	Bangoura 61'	Stadium: Hocine Aït Ahmed Stadium; Referee: Akram Mechairia

5 January 2026 Round 12	JS Kabylie	1–1	MB Rouissat	Tizi Ouzou
17:45	Bott 88'	Soccerway; LFP	Zeghad 61'	Stadium: Hocine Aït Ahmed Stadium; Referee: Youcef Tayeb Bouderbal

9 January 2026 Round 15	CR Belouizdad	0–1	JS Kabylie	Algiers
18:00		Soccerway; LFP	Mahious 71'	Stadium: Stade du 5 Juillet; Referee: Alaa Bouab

21 February 2026 Round 20	ES Mostaganem	2–2	JS Kabylie	Sidi Ali
14:30	Motrani 51', 90+5'	Soccerway; LFP	Belaïd 68'; Sarr 81'	Stadium: Larbi Belhamiti Stadium; Referee: Abdelali Ibrir

26 February 2026 Round 21	MC Alger	0–0	JS Kabylie	Douéra
22:00		Soccerway; LFP		Stadium: Ali La Pointe Stadium; Referee: Lahlou Benbraham

6 March 2026 Round 22	JS Kabylie	3–2	Paradou AC	Tizi Ouzou
22:00	Mahious 7', 21', 88' (pen.)	Soccerway; LFP	Kohili 26'; Ait El Hadj 90+2'	Stadium: Hocine Aït Ahmed Stadium; Referee: Nabil Boukhalfa

13 March 2026 Round 23	USM Khenchela	2–1	JS Kabylie	Khenchela
15:15	Matouti 45+3', 72'	Soccerway; LFP	Messaoudi 45'	Stadium: Amar Hamam Stadium; Referee: Tayeb Benyebka

18 March 2026 Round 24	JS Kabylie	0–1	JS Saoura	Tizi Ouzou
22:00		Soccerway; LFP	Saadi 38'	Stadium: Hocine Aït Ahmed Stadium; Referee: Mustapha Ghorbal

25 March 2026 Round 16	USM Alger	0–1	JS Kabylie	Algiers
20:00		Soccerway; LFP	Madani 11'	Stadium: Stade du 5 Juillet; Referee: Alaa Bouab

1 April 2026 Round 17	JS Kabylie	3–1	ES Ben Aknoun	Tizi Ouzou
16:00	Boudebouz 14' (pen.); Tichtich 24'; Akhrib 88'	Soccerway; LFP	Saâd 27'	Stadium: Hocine Aït Ahmed Stadium; Referee: Tahar Boudjemaa

5 April 2026 Round 25	MC El Bayadh	1–1	JS Kabylie	El Bayadh
18:00	Barkat 31'	Soccerway; LFP	Boudebouz 39'	Stadium: Zakaria Medjdoub Stadium; Referee: Ayoub Belhachemi

10 April 2026 Round 26	JS Kabylie	2–2	CS Constantine	Tizi Ouzou
17:45	Akhrib 19'; Mahious 88'	Soccerway; LFP	Rebiaï 56'; Benmoussa 90+2'	Stadium: Hocine Aït Ahmed Stadium; Referee: Akram Mechairia

17 April 2026 Round 27	MB Rouissat	1–1	JS Kabylie	Ouargla
16:00	Benkheira 35'	Soccerway; LFP	Messaoudi 52'	Stadium: 18 February Stadium; Referee: Fateh Harkat

22 April 2026 Round 18	Olympique Akbou	1–1	JS Kabylie	Béjaïa
16:00	Addadi 89'	Soccerway; LFP	Bott 47'	Stadium: Maghrebi Unity Stadium; Referee: Youcef Taieb Bouderbal

29 April 2026 Round 19	JS Kabylie	1–2	MC Oran	Tizi Ouzou
17:45	Mahious 45+10' (pen.)	Soccerway; LFP	Kerroum 58' (pen.); Bourdim 90+2'	Stadium: Hocine Aït Ahmed Stadium; Referee: Rafik Aouina

8 May 2026 Round 28	JS Kabylie	5–1	ES Sétif	Tizi Ouzou
17:45	Izem 27'; Mahious 43', 62', 81'; Messaoudi 68'	Soccerway; LFP	Hamek 90'	Stadium: Hocine Aït Ahmed Stadium; Referee: Mehdi Oukil

20 May 2026 Round 29	ASO Chlef	1–2	JS Kabylie	Chlef
17:45	Bekkouche 19'	Soccerway; LFP	Malki 30'; Akhrib 72'	Stadium: Mohamed Boumezrag Stadium; Referee: Dhikra Houia

5 June 2026 Round 30	JS Kabylie	0–0	CR Belouizdad	Tizi Ouzou
20:00		Soccerway; LFP		Stadium: Hocine Aït Ahmed Stadium; Referee: Youcef Taieb Bouderbal

=== Algerian Cup ===
4 December 2025 Round of 64	JS Kabylie	7–0	MB Hassi Messaoud	Tizi Ouzou
17:45	Bellaouel 4'; Lahmeri 6'; Messaoudi 16' (pen.); Mahious 36'; Hamidi 39'; Malki 62'; Tichtich 89'	Report		Stadium: Hocine Aït Ahmed Stadium; Referee: Mehdi Oukil

12 December 2025 Round of 32	USM El Harrach	1–0	JS Kabylie	Baraki
16:30	Bensaha 45'	Report		Stadium: Nelson Mandela Stadium; Referee: Nabil Boukhalfa

=== Champions League ===
==== Qualifying rounds ====
In the qualifying rounds, each tie will be played on a home-and-away two-legged basis. If the aggregate score will be tied after the second leg, the away goals rule will be applied, and if still tied, extra time will not be played, and a penalty shoot-out will be used to determine the winner (Regulations III. 13 & 14). The draw for the qualifying rounds was held on 9 August 2025, 10:00 GMT (13:00 local time, UTC+3), in Dar es Salaam, Tanzania.

===== First round =====
20 September 2025 First leg	Bibiani Gold Stars (Ghana)	0–2	(Algeria) JS Kabylie	Accra
15:00 UTC+0		Report	Merghem 21'; Sarr 71'	Stadium: Accra Sports Stadium; Referee: Georges Gotogato (Burundi)
Note: JS Kabylie Lineups: Hadid, Belaïd, Benchaa, Hamidi (substituted off) 46' (Nechat, (substituted on) 46'), Mouali (substituted off) 77' (Bott, (substituted on) 77'), Bada (substituted off) 77' (Boudjemaa, (substituted on) 77'), Sarr, Merghem (substituted off) 66' (Akhrib, (substituted on) 66'), Lahmeri, Mahious, Messaoudi (substituted off) 66' (Malki, (substituted on) 66').

28 September 2025 Second leg	JS Kabylie (Algeria)	5–0 (7–0 agg.)	(Ghana) Bibiani Gold Stars	Tizi Ouzou
20:00 UTC+1	Kobi 7' (o.g.); Boudebouz 29'; Merghem 64'; Akhrib 68'; Malki 90+1'	Report		Stadium: Hocine Aït Ahmed Stadium; Referee: Rashid Conteh (Sierra Leone)
Note: JS Kabylie Lineups: Hadid, Belaïd (substituted off) 46' (Madani, (substituted on) 46'), Benchaa, Nechat, Mouali (substituted off) 46' (Cherir, (substituted on) 46'), Bada (substituted off) 46' (Bott, (substituted on) 46'), Boudjemaa, Boudebouz (substituted off) 64' (Mahious, (substituted on) 64'), Merghem (substituted off) 64' (Malki, (substituted on) 64'), Akhrib, Messaoudi.

===== Second round =====
17 October 2025 First leg	US Monastir (Tunisia)	0–3	(Algeria) JS Kabylie	Sfax
15:00 UTC+1		Report	Merghem 49'; Akhrib 64'; Sarr 89'	Stadium: Taieb Mhiri Stadium; Referee: Pierre Ghislain Atcho (Gabon)
Note: JS Kabylie Lineups: Hadid, Belaïd, Benchaa, Hamidi, Nechat, Sarr, Boudjemaa (substituted off) 77' (Bott, (substituted on) 77'), Merghem (substituted off) 55' (Akhrib, (substituted on) 55'), Lahmeri (substituted off) 77' (Mouali, (substituted on) 77'), Mahious (substituted off) 46' (Bada, (substituted on) 46'), Messaoudi (substituted off) 84' (Boudebouz, (substituted on) 84').

25 October 2025 Second leg	JS Kabylie (Algeria)	2–1 (5–1 agg.)	(Tunisia) US Monastir	Tizi Ouzou
19:00 UTC+1	Akhrib 8', 90+3'	Report	Chikhaoui 22'	Stadium: Hocine Aït Ahmed Stadium; Referee: Mutaz Ibrahim (Libya)
Note: JS Kabylie Lineups: Hadid, Belaïd, Madani, Hamidi (substituted off) 85' (Bellaouel, (substituted on) 85'), Nechat (substituted off) 85' (Benatia, (substituted on) 85'), Sarr (substituted off) 79' (Bott, (substituted on) 79'), Boudjemaa, Boudebouz, Malki (substituted off) 79' (Cherir, (substituted on) 79'), Akhrib, Messaoudi (substituted off) 37' (Mahious, (substituted on) 37').

==== Group stage ====
The draw for the group stage was held on 3 November 2025, 12:00 GMT (14:00 local time, UTC+2), in Johannesburg, South Africa. The 16 winners of the second round will be drawn into four groups of four. The teams were seeded by their performances in the CAF competitions for the previous five seasons (CAF 5-year ranking points shown next to every team). Each group contained one team from each of Pot 1 and Pot 2, Pot 3 and Pot 4, and each team was allocated to the positions in their group according to their pot.

Pos	Team	Pld	W	D	L	GF	GA	GD	Pts	Qualification	AHL	ASFAR	YNG	JSK
1	(Egypt) Al Ahly	6	2	4	0	8	3	+5	10	Advance to knockout stage	—	0–0	2–0	4–1
2	(Morocco) AS FAR	6	2	3	1	3	2	+1	9	Advance to knockout stage	1–1	—	1–0	1–0
3	(Tanzania) Young Africans	6	2	2	2	5	4	+1	8		1–1	1–0	—	3–0
4	(Algeria) JS Kabylie	6	0	3	3	1	8	−7	3		0–0	0–0	0–0	—

Source: CAF

22 November 2025 1	Al Ahly (Egypt)	4–1	(Algeria) JS Kabylie	Cairo
18:00 UTC+2	Trézéguet 36', 84'; Sherif 39'; Hadid 90+3' (o.g.)	Report	El Shenawy 57' (o.g.)	Stadium: Cairo International Stadium; Referee: Mehrez Melki (Tunisia)

28 November 2025 2	JS Kabylie (Algeria)	0–0	(Tanzania) Young Africans	Tizi Ouzou
17:00 UTC+1		Report		Stadium: Hocine Aït Ahmed Stadium; Referee: Ahmad Heeralall (Mauritius)

24 January 2026 3	JS Kabylie (Algeria)	0–0	(Morocco) AS FAR	Tizi Ouzou
17:00 UTC+1		Report		Stadium: Hocine Aït Ahmed Stadium; Referee: Abdoul Karim Twagirumukiza (Rwanda)

31 January 2026 4	AS FAR (Morocco)	1–0	(Algeria) JS Kabylie	Rabat
20:00 UTC+1	Khabba 74'	Report		Stadium: Prince Moulay Abdellah Stadium; Referee: Hillary Hambaba (Zambia)

7 February 2026 5	JS Kabylie (Algeria)	0–0	(Egypt) Al Ahly	Tizi Ouzou
20:00 UTC+1		Report		Stadium: Hocine Aït Ahmed Stadium; Referee: Brighton Chimene (Zimbabwe)

15 February 2026 6	Young Africans (Tanzania)	3–0	(Algeria) JS Kabylie	Zanzibar City
19:00 UTC+3	Depú 36' (pen.), 63'; Boka 66'	Report		Stadium: Amaan Stadium; Referee: Jean-Jacques Ndala (DR Congo)

== Squad information ==
=== Appearances and goals ===
As of 5 June 2026

No.	Pos	Player	Nat	Ligue 1			Algerian Cup			Champions League			Total		
No.	Pos	Player	Nat	App	St	G	App	St	G	App	St	G	App	St	G
Goalkeepers
16	GK	Gaya Merbah	(Algeria)	19	19	0	2	2	0	3	3	0	24	24	0
21	GK	Mohamed Idir Hadid	(Algeria)	10	10	0	0	0	0	6	6	0	16	16	0
22	GK	Seif Benrabah	(Algeria)	1	1	0	0	0	0	1	1	0	2	2	0
Defenders
2	RB	Fares Nechat Djabri	(Algeria)	28	19	0	1	0	0	8	5	0	37	24	0
3	CB	Chahine Bellaouel	(Algeria)	10	7	0	1	1	1	4	1	0	15	9	1
4	CB	Mostapha Bott	(Algeria)	23	11	3	2	1	0	10	4	0	35	16	3
5	CB	Zineddine Belaïd	(Algeria)	22	22	1	1	1	0	10	10	0	33	33	1
13	RB	Oussama Benatia	(Algeria)	3	0	0	1	0	0	2	0	0	6	0	0
14	LB	Abdelhak Cherir	(Algeria)	3	0	0	1	0	0	2	0	0	6	0	0
17	RB	Mohamed Réda Hamidi	(Algeria)	28	24	0	2	2	1	8	8	0	38	34	1
20	CB	Mohamed Amine Madani	(Algeria)	15	13	2	2	2	0	7	5	0	24	20	2
24	LB	Chouaib Boulkaboul	(Algeria)	15	13	0	0	0	0	3	2	0	18	15	0
26	LB	Ahmed Maâmeri	(Algeria)	16	7	0	2	2	0	2	2	0	20	11	0
28	CB	Reda Benchaa	(Algeria)	20	18	0	0	0	0	4	4	0	24	22	0
Midfielders
10	AM	Ryad Boudebouz	(Algeria)	22	17	5	1	1	0	8	6	1	31	24	6
12	CM	Josaphat Arthur Bada	(Ivory Coast)	25	20	0	2	2	0	8	7	0	35	29	0
15	CM	Youcef Izem	(Algeria)	9	3	1	1	0	0	2	0	0	12	3	1
25	DM	Babacar Sarr	(Senegal)	28	20	2	0	0	0	8	6	2	36	26	4
Forwards
7	RW	Jaredi Teixeira	(Angola)	12	7	0	0	0	1	2	0	0	14	7	0
9	ST	Billel Messaoudi	(Algeria)	21	19	4	2	1	1	10	9	0	33	29	5
11	RW	Lahlou Akhrib	(Algeria)	29	16	3	1	1	0	10	8	4	40	25	7
18	ST	Aymen Mahious	(Algeria)	27	26	14	2	2	1	9	6	0	38	34	15
27	ST	Oualid Malki	(Algeria)	19	2	2	2	1	1	6	2	1	27	5	4
29	LW	Célestin Ecua	(Chad)	9	3	0	0	0	0	2	0	0	11	3	0
30	RW	Islam Tichtich	(Algeria)	12	5	1	1	0	1	2	0	0	15	5	2
Players transferred out during the season
~~8~~	CM	Mehdi Boudjemaa	(Algeria)	14	10	0	1	1	0	6	5	0	21	16	0
~~7~~	LW	Aimen Lahmeri	(Algeria)	8	6	0	2	2	1	4	2	0	14	10	1
~~23~~	LB	Hamza Mouali	(Algeria)	5	1	0	0	0	0	4	3	0	9	4	0
~~19~~	RW	Mehdi Merghem	(Algeria)	14	10	1	2	0	0	5	5	3	21	15	4
Total				30		40	2		7	10		13	42		60

Last updated: 5 June 2026
Source: soccerway.com

=== Goalscorers ===
As of 5 June 2026

Includes all competitive matches.

No.	Nat.	Player	Pos.	L1	AC	CL	TOTAL
18	(Algeria)	Aymen Mahious	ST	14	1	0	15
11	(Algeria)	Lahlou Akhrib	RW	3	0	4	7
10	(Algeria)	Ryad Boudebouz	AM	5	0	1	6
9	(Algeria)	Billel Messaoudi	ST	4	1	0	5
25	(Senegal)	Babacar Sarr	DM	2	0	2	4
27	(Algeria)	Oualid Malki	ST	2	1	1	4
4	(Algeria)	Mostapha Bott	CB	3	0	0	3
20	(Algeria)	Mohamed Amine Madani	CB	2	0	0	2
30	(Algeria)	Islam Tichtich	RW	1	1	0	2
3	(Algeria)	Chahine Bellaouel	CB	0	1	0	1
17	(Algeria)	Mohamed Réda Hamidi	RB	0	1	0	1
5	(Algeria)	Zineddine Belaïd	CB	1	0	0	1
15	(Algeria)	Youcef Izem	CM	1	0	0	1
Players transferred out during the season
~~19~~	(Algeria)	Mehdi Merghem	RW	1	0	3	4
~~7~~	(Algeria)	Aimen Lahmeri	LW	0	1	0	1
Own Goals				1	0	2	3
Totals				40	7	13	60

=== Clean sheets ===
As of 5 June 2026

					Clean sheets			
No.	Nat	Name	GP	GA	L1	AC	CL	Total
16	(Algeria)	Gaya Merbah	24	24	3	1	2	6
21	(Algeria)	Mohamed Idir Hadid	16	14	3	0	4	7
22	(Algeria)	Seif Benrabah	2	3	1	0	0	1
		TOTALS		41	7	1	6	14
