= 2024–25 JS Kabylie season =

JS Kabylie
2024–25 season
- Owner: ATM Mobilis
- President: El Hadi Ould Ali
- Head coach: Abdelhak Benchikha (from 30 June 2024) (until 3 January 2025); Josef Zinnbauer (from 20 January 2025)
- Stadium: Hocine Aït Ahmed Stadium
- Ligue 1: Runners-up
- Algerian Cup: Round of 32
- Top goalscorer: League: Redouane Berkane (8 goals); All: Redouane Berkane (10 goals)
- Average home league attendance: 31,158
- Biggest win: JS Kabylie 3-0 MC El Bayadh; Paradou AC 0-3 JS Kabylie
- Biggest defeat: MC Oran 2-0 JS Kabylie

The 2024–25 season, is JS Kabylie's 56th consecutive season in the top flight of Algerian football. In addition to the domestic league, JS Kabylie are participating in the Algerian Cup. On June 27, 2024, The federal office approved the calendar for the 2024–25 Ligue 1 season with the aim of ending on May 31, 2025. The first round is scheduled for September 14, this delay is motivated both by an extended end of the 2023–24 season but also by the holding of early presidential elections which will take place on September 7, 2024. However, the Ligue de Football Professionnel decided to postpone the start of the Ligue 1 by a week, on September 21.

== Review ==
=== Background ===
On June 30, 2024, JS Kabylie signed Abdelhak Benchikha as a new coach. ATM Mobilis also congratulated and thanked Benchikha for choosing JS Kabylie and for preferring it to other national and international offers, according to a press release on the official X account of the Algerian Telecom Company. On July 10, 2024, the President of the Republic Abdelmadjid Tebboune, supervised the inauguration of the Stadium bearing the name of Hocine Aït Ahmed, in the presence of some former players of JS Kabylie. Following urgent requests from certain clubs, the Algerian Football Federation has decided to increase the number of foreign players in the Ligue 1. After having formally passed through the technical college chaired by Rabah Saâdane, the FAF ratified the increase in the number of foreigners per club from 3 to 5. However, that there is a provision intended to serve as a safeguard for the license of a foreign player or coach to be validated, the club must pay the federation a deposit equivalent to 12 months salary. This is to protect against any financial dispute.

On September 17, during a friendly match against US Biskra at the New Aït Ahmed stadium, goalkeeper Gaya Merbah suffered a serious injury, a fracture in his leg bone (fracture du tibia), which required his immediate transfer to Tizi Ouzou Hospital. Due to the seriousness of his injury, the match was stopped and Merbah will be out until the end of the season. The Algerian Football Federation regulations stipulate that clubs can contract with a goalkeeper if one of their goalkeepers suffers a serious injury, such as Merbah.

==== First-team transfers (summer transfer window) ====
On June 20, 2024, JS Kabylie is the first elite club to open the recruiting ball. Signed a contract for five seasons with Gaya Merbah, former goalkeeper of IR Tanger. Merbah was presented in the head office of ATM Mobilis operator and in the presence of its CEO, Chaouki Boukhazani. Also present were El Hadi Ould Ali chairman of the board of directors, Hakim Medane general director and Karim Doudane general manager. JS Kabylie then terminated Chamseddine Rahmani's contract which was terminated amicably. On July 4, 2024, the second defensive reinforcements arrived with the signing of international defender Mohamed Amine Madani a three-year contract coming from CS Constantine.

== Squad list ==
Players and squad numbers last updated on 14 June 2024.
Note: Flags indicate national team as has been defined under FIFA eligibility rules. Players may hold more than one non-FIFA nationality.

No.	Nat.	Name	Position	Date of birth (age)	Signed from
Goalkeepers
16	(Algeria)	Gaya Merbah	GK	22 July 1994 (aged 30)	(Morocco) IR Tanger
21	(Algeria)	Mohamed Idir Hadid	GK	26 April 2002 (aged 22)	(Algeria) Reserve team
22	(Algeria)	Seif Benrabah	GK	23 March 2003 (aged 21)	(Algeria) Reserve team
Defenders
2	(Algeria)	Fares Nechat Djabri	RB	25 May 2001 (aged 23)	(Algeria) Reserve team
4	(Algeria)	Idir Mokedem	CB	5 June 1994 (aged 30)	(Algeria) Paradou AC (loan)
18	(Algeria)	Mohamed Réda Hamidi	RB	8 June 2001 (aged 23)	(Algeria) Paradou AC (loan)
20	(Algeria)	Mohamed Amine Madani	CB	20 March 1992 (aged 32)	(Algeria) CS Constantine
23	(Algeria)	Abdelhamid Driss	CB	12 February 2002 (aged 22)	(Algeria) NC Magra
26	(Algeria)	Ahmed Maâmeri	LB	25 June 1997 (aged 27)	(Algeria) CS Constantine
28	(Mali)	Youssouf Koné	LB	5 July 1995 (aged 29)	(Belgium) Molenbeek
30	(Algeria)	Reda Benchaa	CB	12 March 2002 (aged 22)	(Kuwait) Kazma SC
Midfielders
5	(Algeria)	Ali Amriche	DM	8 December 1998 (aged 25)	(Algeria) US Biskra
6	(Algeria)	Aymen Bendaoud	CM	18 June 2001 (aged 23)	(Algeria) CS Constantine
10	(Algeria)	Ryad Boudebouz	AM	19 February 1990 (aged 34)	(Saudi Arabia) Ohod Club
14	(Algeria)	Hadji Chekal Affari	CM	24 February 2003 (aged 21)	(Algeria) CS Constantine
24	(Algeria)	Mehdi Boudjemaa	CM	7 April 1998 (aged 26)	(Turkey) Çorum
25	(Senegal)	Babacar Sarr	DM	24 July 1997 (aged 27)	Unattached
Forwards
3	(Algeria)	Aimen Lahmeri	LW	28 May 1996 (aged 28)	(Algeria) JS Saoura
7	(Algeria)	Massinissa Nezla	ST	12 September 1998 (aged 26)	(Algeria) Reserve team
9	(Russia)	Ivan Ignatyev	ST	6 January 1999 (aged 25)	(Armenia) FC Urartu
11	(Algeria)	Kouceila Boualia	RW	14 March 2001 (aged 23)	(Algeria) Reserve team
12	(Algeria)	Adem Redjem	LW	1 January 1997 (aged 27)	(Algeria) Paradou AC
15	(Democratic Republic of the Congo)	Walter Bwalya	ST	5 May 1995 (aged 29)	(Oman) Al-Nahda
27	(Algeria)	Redouane Berkane	ST	7 July 2003 (aged 21)	(Algeria) Olympique Akbou
48	(Algeria)	Lahlou Akhrib	RW	24 April 2005 (aged 19)	(Algeria) Reserve team

== Transfers ==
=== In ===
==== Summer ====
Date	Pos	Player	Moving from	Fee	Source
20 June 2024	GK	(Algeria) Gaya Merbah	(Morocco) IR Tanger	Free transfer	
4 July 2024	DF	(Algeria) Mohamed Amine Madani	CS Constantine	Free transfer	
10 July 2024	FW	(Algeria) Aimen Lahmeri	JS Saoura	Undisclosed	
12 July 2024	MF	(Mali) Sadio Kanouté	(Tanzania) Simba	Undisclosed	
17 July 2024	DF	(Algeria) Mohamed Réda Hamidi	Paradou AC	Loan for one year	
17 July 2024	CB	(Algeria) Idir Mokedem	Paradou AC	Loan for one year	
20 July 2024	FW	(Algeria) Lounes Adjout	CR Belouizdad	Undisclosed	
25 July 2024	MF	(Senegal) Babacar Sarr	Unattached	Free transfer	
28 July 2024	MF	(Algeria) Hadji Chekal Affari	CS Constantine	Free transfer	
2 August 2024	FW	(Burkina Faso) Djibril Ouattara	(Morocco) RS Berkane	Free transfer	
5 August 2024	FW	(Democratic Republic of the Congo) Walter Bwalya	(Oman) Al-Nahda	Free transfer	
9 September 2024	LB	(Mali) Youssouf Koné	(Belgium) Molenbeek	Free transfer	
10 September 2024	AM	(Algeria) Ryad Boudebouz	(Saudi Arabia) Ohod Club	Free transfer	

==== Winter ====
Date	Pos	Player	Moving to	Fee	Source
17 January 2025	MF	(Algeria) Mehdi Boudjemaa	(Turkey) Çorum	Free transfer	
4 February 2025	DF	(Algeria) Reda Benchaa	(Kuwait) Kazma SC	Free transfer	
5 February 2025	FW	(Russia) Ivan Ignatyev	(Armenia) FC Urartu	Undisclosed	

=== Out ===
==== Summer ====
Date	Pos	Player	Moving to	Fee	Source
30 June 2024	GK	(Algeria) Chamseddine Rahmani	Unattached (Note: Rahmani joined MC Oran on 2 July 2024.)	Free transfer (Released)	
18 July 2024	FW	(Algeria) Dadi El Hocine Mouaki	Unattached (Note: Mouaki joined CS Constantine on 20 July 2024.)	Free transfer (Released)	
18 July 2024	MF	(Algeria) Mohamed Reda Boumechra	Unattached (Note: Boumechra joined USM Khenchela on 5 August 2024.)	Free transfer (Released)	
20 July 2024	CB	(Algeria) Badreddine Souyad	Unattached (Note: Souyad joined CR Belouizdad on 21 July 2024.)	Free transfer (Released)	
23 July 2024	RB	(Algeria) Oussama Gatal	Unattached	Free transfer (Released)	
23 July 2024	FW	(Algeria) Faik Amrane	Unattached	Free transfer (Released)	
23 July 2024	LB	(Algeria) Rafik Mendas	Unattached	Free transfer (Released)	
23 July 2024	GK	(Algeria) Fouad Zegrar	Unattached (Note: Zegrar joined MC El Bayadh on 14 August 2024.)	Free transfer (Released)	
23 August 2024	MF	(Mali) Mamadou Traore	Unattached	Free transfer (Released)	
26 August 2024	CF	(Gabon) Essang Matouti	Unattached	Free transfer (Released)	

==== Winter ====
Date	Pos	Player	Moving to	Fee	Source
7 January 2025	ST	(Burkina Faso) Djibril Ouattara	Unattached	Free transfer (Released)	
26 January 2025	DM	(Algeria) Sid Ahmed Maatallah	JS Saoura	Loan for six months	
4 February 2025	FW	(Algeria) Lounes Adjout	Olympique Akbou	Free transfer (Released)	
8 February 2025	LB	(Algeria) Moussa Benzaid	(Libya) Asswehly SC	350,000 €	

== Pre-season and friendlies ==
20 August 2024 Friendly	JS Kabylie (Algeria)	2–1	(Turkey) Turgutluspor	Kartepe, Turkey
17:00 UTC+3	Adem Redjem 57'; Lahlou Akhrib 77'

24 August 2024 Friendly	JS Kabylie (Algeria)	1–1	(Bahrain) Al-Muharraq SC	Kartepe, Turkey
17:00 UTC+3	Lahmeri 8'

27 August 2024 Friendly	JS Kabylie (Algeria)	3–1	(United Arab Emirates) Al Dhaid SC	Kartepe, Turkey
15:00 UTC+3	Berkane 69'; Bwalya 89'; Boualia 90+2'		? 33' (pen.)

30 August 2024 Friendly	JS Kabylie (Algeria)	1–1	(Turkey) Gaziantep	Kartepe, Turkey
15:00 UTC+3	Boualia 3'		? 48'

== Competitions ==
=== Overview ===
Competition	Record								Started round	Final position / round	First match	Last match
Competition	G	W	D	L	GF	GA	GD	Win %	Started round	Final position / round	First match	Last match
Ligue 1	30	16	8	6	42	27	+15	53.33	—N/a	Runner-up	27 September 2024	20 June 2025
Algerian Cup	2	1	0	1	2	1	+1	50.00	Round of 64	Round of 32	3 January 2025	10 January 2025
Total	32	17	8	7	44	28	+16	53.13				

Updated to match played 20 June 2025
Source: Competitions

=== Ligue 1 ===
==== League table ====
Pos	Team	Pld	W	D	L	GF	GA	GD	Pts	Qualification or relegation
1	MC Alger (C)	30	15	13	2	39	19	+20	58	Qualification for CAF Champions League
2	JS Kabylie	30	16	8	6	42	27	+15	56	Qualification for CAF Champions League
3	CR Belouizdad	30	15	10	5	44	21	+23	55	Qualification for Confederation Cup (Note: USMA Alger qualified for the 2025–26 CAF Confederation Cup by winning the 2024–25 Algerian Cup)
4	JS Saoura	30	12	7	11	34	36	−2	43	
5	Paradou AC	30	11	8	11	41	39	+2	41	

Source: the-sports.org
Rules for classification: 1) points; 2) head-to-head points; 3) head-to-head goal difference; 4) goal difference; 5) total goals; 6) fairplay ranking; 7) playoff.
(C) Champions

==== Results summary ====
Overall								Home						Away					
Pld	W	D	L	GF	GA	GD	Pts	W	D	L	GF	GA	GD	W	D	L	GF	GA	GD
30	16	8	6	42	27	+15	56	10	2	3	24	14	+10	6	6	3	18	13	+5

Last updated: 20 June 2025.
Source: Competitive matches

==== Results by round ====
Round	1	2	3	4	5	6	7	8	9	10	11	12	13	14	15	16	17	18	19	20	21	22	23	24	25	26	27	28	29	30
Ground	H	H	A	H	A	H	A	H	A	H	A	H	A	H	A	A	A	H	A	H	A	H	A	H	A	H	A	H	A	H
Result	L	W	W	L	L	W	W	D	D	W	D	W	D	W	L	L	D	W	D	W	W	D	W	W	W	L	W	W	D	W
Position	14	7	2	4	10	5	2	4	5	3	3	2	2	1	4	4	4	4	4	4	3	3	3	3	2	2	2	2	3	2

Updated to match(es) played on 20 June 2025. Source: Competitive matches
A = Away; H = Home; W = Win; D = Draw; L = Loss

==== Matches ====
The league fixtures were announced on 11 July 2024.

All times are local, WAT (UTC+1).

Win Draw Loss Postponed

27 September 2024 Round 2	JS Kabylie	2–1	Olympique Akbou	Tizi Ouzou
17:45	Boualia 3'; Lahmeri 64'	Report	Haroun 40' (pen.)	Stadium: Hocine Aït Ahmed Stadium; Referee: Mustapha Ghorbal; VAR: Fateh Harkat

1 October 2024 Round 1	JS Kabylie	1–2	MC Alger	Tizi Ouzou
18:00	Madani 42'	Report	Tabti 9'; Halaïmia 68'	Stadium: Hocine Aït Ahmed Stadium; Referee: Nabil Boukhalfa; VAR: Lahlou Benbraham

6 October 2024 Round 3	Paradou AC	0–3	JS Kabylie	Algiers
16:00		Report	Kanouté 20'; Boualia 79'; Hadji 90+5'	Stadium: 20 August 1955 Stadium; Referee: Said Aouina

12 October 2024 Round 4	JS Kabylie	2–3	CS Constantine	Tizi Ouzou
17:45	Boudebouz 38' (pen.), 90+9' (pen.)	Report	Dib 13', 61', 64'	Stadium: Hocine Aït Ahmed Stadium; Referee: Yahia Dehar; VAR: Rafik Aouina

19 October 2024 Round 5	MC Oran	2–0	JS Kabylie	Bir El Djir
19:00	Mammar 26'; Dahar 82' (pen.)	Report		Stadium: Miloud Hadefi Stadium; Referee: Fateh Harkat; VAR: Lotfi Bekouassa

26 October 2024 Round 6	JS Kabylie	1–0	USM Khenchela	Tizi Ouzou
17:30	Bwalya 28'	Report		Stadium: Hocine Aït Ahmed Stadium; Referee: Anes Azrine; VAR: Lahlou Benbraham

3 November 2024 Round 7	US Biskra	0–1	JS Kabylie	Biskra
16:00		Report	Sarr 84'	Stadium: 18 February Stadium; Attendance: 0 (close doors); Referee: Houssam Benyahia

9 November 2024 Round 8	JS Kabylie	0–0	USM Alger	Tizi Ouzou
17:30		Report		Stadium: Hocine Aït Ahmed Stadium; Referee: Mustapha Ghorbal; VAR: Lahlou Benbraham

2 December 2024 Round 11	JS Saoura	1–1	JS Kabylie	Béchar
16:00	Akacem 30' (pen.)	Report	Bwalya 2'	Stadium: 20 August 1955 Stadium; Referee: Youcef Gamouh

8 December 2024 Round 12	JS Kabylie	2–1	NC Magra	Tizi Ouzou
17:45	Boudebouz 44'; Ouattara 84'	Report	Kemoukh 25'	Stadium: Hocine Aït Ahmed Stadium; Referee: Youcef Taieb Bouderbal; VAR: Abderahmane Sahraoui

13 December 2024 Round 13	ES Sétif	2–2	JS Kabylie	Sétif
17:00	Diarra 45+1'; Chaabi 69'	Report	Madani 67' (pen.); Sarr 90+1'	Stadium: 8 May 1945 Stadium; Attendance: 0 (close doors); Referee: Akram Mechairia; VAR: Fateh Harkat

17 December 2024 Round 10	JS Kabylie	3–0	MC El Bayadh	Tizi Ouzou
17:30	Akhrib 30'; Berkane 75' (pen.); Boudebouz 86'	Report		Stadium: Hocine Aït Ahmed Stadium; Referee: Tahar Boudjemaa; VAR: Houssam Benyahia

21 December 2024 Round 14	JS Kabylie	2–1	ES Mostaganem	Tizi Ouzou
17:00	Boudebouz 8'; Boualia 63'	Report	Belkhadem 80'	Stadium: Hocine Aït Ahmed Stadium; Referee: Houssam Benyahia; VAR: Anes Azrine

28 December 2024 Round 15	ASO Chlef	1–0	JS Kabylie	Chlef
15:00	Agbagno 90+5' (pen.)	Report		Stadium: Mohamed Boumezrag Stadium; Referee: Anes Azrine; VAR: Lahlou Benbraham

21 January 2025 Round 9	CR Belouizdad	1–1	JS Kabylie	Algiers
17:45	Mahious 70'	Report	Malki 86'	Stadium: Stade du 5 Juillet; Referee: Alaa Bouab; VAR: Mustapha Ghorbal

13 February 2025 Round 16	MC Alger	3–2	JS Kabylie	Algiers
20:00	Bouras 45+4'; Naidji 66'; Meziani 78'	Report	Ignatyev 71'; Berkane 82'	Stadium: Stade du 5 Juillet; Referee: Yahia Dehar; VAR: Lahlou Benbraham

19 February 2025 Round 17	Olympique Akbou	0–0	JS Kabylie	Béjaïa
15:30		Report		Stadium: Maghrebi Unity Stadium; Attendance: 0 (close doors); Referee: Youcef Taieb Bouderbal; VAR: Nabil Boukhalfa

28 February 2025 Round 18	JS Kabylie	2–1	Paradou AC	Tizi Ouzou
16:45	Berkane 2'; Madani 81' (pen.)	Report	Bouzahzah 71'	Stadium: Hocine Aït Ahmed Stadium; Attendance: 0 (close doors); Referee: Mustapha Ghorbal; VAR: Rafik Aouina

8 March 2025 Round 19	CS Constantine	1–1	JS Kabylie	Constantine
22:00	Tahar 82'	Report	Berkane 16'	Stadium: Chahid Hamlaoui Stadium; Referee: Alaa Bouab; VAR: Akram Mechairia

14 March 2025 Round 20	JS Kabylie	2–1	MC Oran	Tizi Ouzou
22:00	Ignatyev 16'; Lahmeri 68'	Report	Dahar 54'	Stadium: Hocine Aït Ahmed Stadium; Referee: Anes Azrine; VAR: Rafik Aouina

4 April 2025 Round 21	USM Khenchela	0–1	JS Kabylie	Khenchela
16:00		Report	Berkane 90+2'	Stadium: Amar Hamam Stadium; Referee: Rafik Aouina

12 April 2025 Round 22	JS Kabylie	0–0	US Biskra	Tizi Ouzou
17:00		Report		Stadium: Hocine Aït Ahmed Stadium; Referee: Youcef Taieb Bouderbal; VAR: Yahia Dehar

19 April 2025 Round 23	USM Alger	0–1	JS Kabylie	Algiers
19:00		Report	Sarr 90+3'	Stadium: Stade du 5 Juillet; Attendance: 0 (close doors); Referee: Akram Mechairia; VAR: Nabil Boukhalfa

26 April 2025 Round 24	JS Kabylie	3–2	CR Belouizdad	Tizi Ouzou
19:00	Ignatyev 21'; Berkane 44', 84'	Report	Meziane 25'; Belkhir 69'	Stadium: Hocine Aït Ahmed Stadium; Referee: Lahlou Benbraham; VAR: Fateh Harkat

12 May 2025 Round 25	MC El Bayadh	1–2	JS Kabylie	El Bayadh
17:00	Zeghad 59'	Report	Ignatyev 45+1'; Mammeri 87'	Stadium: Zakaria Medjdoub Stadium; Referee: Alaa Bouab

17 May 2025 Round 26	JS Kabylie	1–2	JS Saoura	Tizi Ouzou
17:00	Lahmeri 14'	Report	Souibaâh 38'; Allaoui 45+7'	Stadium: Hocine Aït Ahmed Stadium; Referee: Tahar Boudjemaa; VAR: Akram Mechairia

25 May 2025 Round 27	NC Magra	1–3	JS Kabylie	Magra
17:00	Djabout 23'	Report	Ignatyev 39'; Berkane 65'; Boualia 79'	Stadium: Boucheligue Brothers Stadium; Referee: Houssam Benyahia

12 June 2025 Round 28	JS Kabylie	2–0	ES Sétif	Tizi Ouzou
21:00	Boudebouz 52'; Boualia 64'	Report		Stadium: Hocine Aït Ahmed Stadium; Referee: Rafik Aouina; VAR: Redouane Allou

16 June 2025 Round 29	ES Mostaganem	0–0	JS Kabylie	Mostaganem
20:00		Report		Stadium: Mohamed Bensaïd Stadium; Referee: Youcef Gamouh; VAR: Yahia Dehar

21 June 2025 Round 30	JS Kabylie	1–0	ASO Chlef	Tizi Ouzou
17:45	Benchaa 17'	Report		Stadium: Hocine Aït Ahmed Stadium; Referee: Lahlou Benbraham; VAR: Ghada Mehat

=== Algerian Cup ===
3 January 2025 Round of 64	ES Guelma	0–2	JS Kabylie	Guelma
14:30		Report	Berkane 32', 40'	Stadium: Boudjemaa Souidani Stadium; Referee: Tayeb Benyabka

10 January 2025 Round of 32	JS Kabylie	0–1	USM El Harrach	Tizi Ouzou
17:00		Report	Ogbi 38' (pen.)	Stadium: Hocine Aït Ahmed Stadium; Referee: Abdelali Ibrir

== Squad information ==
=== Appearances and goals ===
As of 21 June 2025

No.	Pos	Player	Nat	Ligue 1			Algerian Cup			Total		
No.	Pos	Player	Nat	App	St	G	App	St	G	App	St	G
Goalkeepers
16	GK	Gaya Merbah	(Algeria)	0	0	0	0	0	0	0	0	0
21	GK	Mohamed Idir Hadid	(Algeria)	25	25	0	2	2	0	27	27	0
22	GK	Seif Benrabah	(Algeria)	5	5	0	0	0	0	5	5	0
Defenders
2	RB	Fares Nechat Djabri	(Algeria)	21	18	0	2	2	0	23	20	0
4	CB	Idir Mokedem	(Algeria)	23	18	0	0	0	0	23	18	0
18	RB	Mohamed Réda Hamidi	(Algeria)	26	24	0	0	0	0	26	24	0
20	CB	Mohamed Amine Madani	(Algeria)	25	25	3	0	0	0	25	25	3
23	CB	Abdelhamid Driss	(Algeria)	14	12	0	2	2	0	16	14	0
26	LB	Ahmed Maâmeri	(Algeria)	17	4	1	0	0	0	17	4	1
28	LB	Youssouf Koné	(Mali)	11	11	0	2	2	0	13	13	0
30	CB	Reda Benchaa	(Algeria)	3	2	1	0	0	0	3	2	1
Midfielders
5	DM	Ali Amriche	(Algeria)	22	9	0	2	2	0	24	11	0
6	CM	Aymen Bendaoud	(Algeria)	21	13	0	0	0	0	21	13	0
10	AM	Ryad Boudebouz	(Algeria)	20	15	6	1	0	0	21	15	6
14	CM	Hadji Chekal Affari	(Algeria)	11	2	1	2	2	0	13	4	1
24	CM	Mehdi Boudjemaa	(Algeria)	15	13	0	0	0	0	15	13	0
25	DM	Babacar Sarr	(Senegal)	20	16	3	0	0	0	20	16	3
Forwards
3	ST	Aimen Lahmeri	(Algeria)	20	15	3	0	0	0	20	15	3
7	ST	Massinissa Nezla	(Algeria)	3	0	0	1	0	0	4	0	0
9	FW	Ivan Ignatyev	(Russia)	15	10	5	0	0	0	15	10	5
11	ST	Kouceila Boualia	(Algeria)	25	24	5	2	1	0	27	25	5
12	LW	Adem Redjem	(Algeria)	19	9	0	2	2	0	21	11	0
15	ST	Walter Bwalya	(Democratic Republic of the Congo)	13	8	2	2	0	0	15	8	2
27	ST	Redouane Berkane	(Algeria)	28	20	8	2	2	2	30	22	10
34	ST	Oualid Malki	(Algeria)	4	0	1	0	0	0	4	0	1
48	RW	Lahlou Akhrib	(Algeria)	26	11	1	2	1	0	28	12	1
Players transferred out during the season
~~8~~	CM	Sadio Kanouté	(Mali)	13	9	1	2	2	0	15	11	1
~~9~~	ST	Djibril Ouattara	(Burkina Faso)	11	3	1	0	0	0	11	3	1
~~13~~	LB	Moussa Benzaid	(Algeria)	12	9	0	2	2	0	14	11	0
~~17~~	DM	Sid Ahmed Maatallah	(Algeria)	2	0	0	1	0	0	3	0	0
~~19~~	ST	Lounes Adjout	(Algeria)	4	0	0	2	0	0	6	0	0
Total				30		42	2		2	32		44

Last updated: 21 June 2025
Source: mondefootball.fr

=== Goalscorers ===
As of 21 June 2025

Includes all competitive matches.

No.	Nat.	Player	Pos.	L1	AC	TOTAL
27	(Algeria)	Redouane Berkane	ST	8	2	10
10	(Algeria)	Ryad Boudebouz	AM	6	0	6
11	(Algeria)	Kouceila Boualia	ST	5	0	5
9	(Russia)	Ivan Ignatyev	ST	5	0	5
20	(Algeria)	Mohamed Amine Madani	CB	3	0	3
3	(Algeria)	Aimen Lahmeri	ST	3	0	3
25	(Senegal)	Babacar Sarr	DM	3	0	3
15	(Democratic Republic of the Congo)	Walter Bwalya	ST	2	0	2
26	(Algeria)	Ahmed Maâmeri	LB	1	0	1
30	(Algeria)	Reda Benchaa	CB	1	0	1
14	(Algeria)	Hadji Chekal Affari	CM	1	0	1
8	(Mali)	Sadio Kanouté	CM	1	0	1
48	(Algeria)	Lahlou Akhrib	RW	1	0	1
9	(Burkina Faso)	Djibril Ouattara	ST	1	0	1
34	(Algeria)	Oualid Malki	ST	1	0	1
Own Goals				0	0	0
Totals				42	2	44

=== Clean sheets ===
As of 21 June 2025

					Clean sheets		
No.	Nat	Name	GP	GA	L 1	AC	Total
16	(Algeria)	Gaya Merbah	0	0	0	0	0
21	(Algeria)	Mohamed Idir Hadid	27	20	11	1	12
22	(Algeria)	Seif Benrabah	5	8	1	0	1
		TOTALS		28	12	1	13
