= 2025–26 Algerian Ligue Professionnelle 1 =

Algerian Ligue Professionnelle 1
- Season: 2025–26
- Dates: 21 August 2025 – 6 June 2026
- Champions: MC Alger
- Relegated: Paradou AC; ES Mostaganem; MC El Bayadh
- Champions League: MC Alger; JS Saoura
- Confederation Cup: CR Belouizdad; USM Alger
- Matches: 240
- Goals: 544 (2.27 per match)
- Top goalscorer: Aymen Mahious (14 goals)
- Biggest home win: CR Belouizdad 7–0 ES Mostaganem (5 April 2026)
- Biggest away win: ES Mostaganem 0–5 MC Alger (7 March 2026)
- Highest scoring: Paradou AC 3–5 ES Ben Aknoun (14 February 2026); Paradou AC 5–3 CS Constantine (7 May 2026)
- Longest winning run: MC Alger (8 matches)
- Longest unbeaten run: USM Alger (11 matches)
- Longest winless run: MC El Bayadh (14 matches)
- Longest losing run: Paradou AC (9 matches)
- All statistics correct as of 6 June 2026.

The 2025–26 Algerian Ligue Professionnelle 1 was the 64th season of the Algerian Ligue Professionnelle 1 since its establishment in 1962. A total of 16 teams contest the league. It began on 21 August 2025 and concluded on 6 June 2026.

== Teams ==
16 teams contest the league. ES Ben Aknoun and MB Rouissat were promoted from the 2024–25 Algerian Ligue 2.

=== Changes ===
▲ from 2024–25 Algerian Ligue 2	▼ to 2025–26 Algerian League 2
ES Ben Aknoun; MB Rouissat	NC Magra; US Biskra

=== Stadiums and locations ===
Location of teams in 2025–26 Ligue Professionnelle 1
Algiers Province clubs

Club	Location	Venue	Capacity
ASO Chlef	Chlef	Mohamed Boumezrag Stadium	18,000
CR Belouizdad	Algiers	Nelson Mandela Stadium (Note: CR Belouizdad played some home games at 20 August 1955 Stadium due to renovation in Nelson Mandela Stadium.)	40,000
CS Constantine	Constantine	Chahid Hamlaoui Stadium	22,968
ES Ben Aknoun	Algiers	20 August 1955 Stadium	10,000
ES Mostaganem	Mostaganem	Mohamed Bensaïd Stadium	18,000
ES Sétif	Sétif	8 May 1945 Stadium	25,000
JS Kabylie	Tizi Ouzou	Hocine Aït Ahmed Stadium	50,766
JS Saoura	Béchar	20 August 1955 Stadium	20,000
MB Rouissat	Rouissat	18 February Stadium	18,000
MC Alger	Algiers	Ali La Pointe Stadium	40,000
MC El Bayadh	El Bayadh	Zakaria Medjdoub Stadium	15,000
MC Oran	Oran	Miloud Hadefi Stadium	40,143
Olympique Akbou	Akbou	Maghrebi Unity Stadium	17,500
Paradou AC	Algiers	20 August 1955 Stadium	10,000
USM Alger	Algiers	Stade du 5 Juillet (Note: USM Alger played some home games at Mustapha Tchaker Stadium in Blida due to renovation in Stade du 5 Juillet.)	64,000
USM Khenchela	Khenchela	Amar Hamam Stadium	8,000

=== Personnel and kits ===
Team	Manager	Captain	Kit manufacturer
ASO Chlef	(Algeria) Abdelhaq Belaid	(Algeria) Abdellah Debbari	Puma
CR Belouizdad	(Algeria) Ishak Ali Moussa	(Algeria) Abdelraouf Benguit	Puma
CS Constantine	(Algeria) Khaled Guerioune	(Algeria) Brahim Dib	KSC
ES Ben Aknoun	(Algeria) Mounir Zeghdoud	(Algeria) Abderahmane Hachoud	Macron
ES Mostaganem	(Algeria) Nadhir Leknaoui	(Algeria) Boualem Mesmoudi	Rina
ES Sétif	(Algeria) Lotfi Amrouche	(Algeria) Akram Djahnit	Macron
JS Kabylie	(Algeria) Rabah Bensafi	(Algeria) Ryad Boudebouz	Kappa
JS Saoura	(Algeria) Abdelkader Amrani	(Algeria) Riyane Akacem	Umbro
MB Rouissat	(Tunisia) Lassaad Maamar	(Algeria) Khayreddine Merzougui	Macron
MC Alger	(Tunisia) Khaled Ben Yahia	(Algeria) Ayoub Abdellaoui	Peak
MC El Bayadh	(Algeria) Majdi El Kourdi	(Algeria) Belaid Kouar	Macron
MC Oran	(Algeria) Tahar Chérif El-Ouazzani	(Algeria) Ahmed Kerroum	Macron
Olympique Akbou	(Algeria) Amar Guerbi	(Algeria) Walid Bencherifa	Macron
Paradou AC	(Algeria) Azzedine Aït Djoudi	(Algeria) Abdeldjalil Tahri	Macron
USM Alger	(Senegal) Lamine N'Diaye	(Algeria) Saâdi Radouani	Macron
USM Khenchela	(Algeria) Billel Dziri	(Algeria) Abdelhakim Sameur	Macron

=== Managerial changes ===
Team	Outgoing manager	Manner of departure	Date of vacancy	Position in table	Incoming manager	Date of appointment
ES Ben Aknoun	(Algeria) Mohamed Bachir Manaâ	End of contract	16 May 2025	Pre-season	(Algeria) Mounir Zeghdoud	6 July 2025
MB Rouissat	(Algeria) Abdelkader Zemmouri	End of contract	17 May 2025	Pre-season	(Algeria) Abdelkader Amrani	21 July 2025
CS Constantine	(Algeria) Kheïreddine Madoui	End of contract	20 June 2025	Pre-season	(Bosnia and Herzegovina) Rusmir Cviko	14 July 2025
MC Alger	(Tunisia) Khaled Ben Yahia	End of contract	21 June 2025	Pre-season	(South Africa) Rhulani Mokwena	21 July 2025
ES Sétif	(Tunisia) Nabil Kouki	Resigned	21 June 2025	Pre-season	(Germany) Antoine Hey	14 July 2025
MC Oran	(Algeria) Abdelkader Amrani	End of contract	21 June 2025	Pre-season	(France) Hubert Velud	10 August 2025
MC El Bayadh	(Algeria) Lotfi Amrouche	End of contract	21 June 2025	Pre-season	(Algeria) Cherif Hadjar	15 July 2025
USM Alger	(Algeria) Mohamed Lacet	End of contract	5 July 2025	Pre-season	(Algeria) Abdelhak Benchikha	12 August 2025
USM Khenchela	(Algeria) Hocine Achiou	End of contract	21 June 2025	Pre-season	(Algeria) Djilali Bahloul	15 July 2025
Olympique Akbou	(Algeria) Yacine Ouzani	End of contract	21 June 2025	Pre-season	(Algeria) Lotfi Amrouche	15 July 2025
JS Saoura	(Algeria) Moustapha Djallit	End of contract	21 June 2025	Pre-season	(Algeria) Lotfi Boudraa	19 July 2025
ASO Chlef	(Algeria) Samir Zaoui	End of contract	21 June 2025	Pre-season	(Algeria) Fouad Bouali	21 July 2025
MC Oran	(France) Hubert Velud	Resigned	18 August 2025	Pre-season	(Spain) Juan Carlos Garrido	8 September 2025
Paradou AC	(Algeria) Billel Dziri	Sacked	12 September 2025	16th	(Tunisia) Sofiène Hidoussi	16 September 2025
ES Sétif	(Germany) Antoine Hey	Sacked	2 October 2025	13th	(Algeria) Taoufik Rouabah	2 October 2025
MC El Bayadh	(Algeria) Cherif Hadjar	Sacked	7 October 2025	15th	(Algeria) Mohamed Lacet	7 October 2025
MB Rouissat	(Algeria) Abdelkader Amrani	Resigned	25 October 2025	5th	(Algeria) Chérif Hadjar	3 November 2025
ES Sétif	(Algeria) Taoufik Rouabah	Sacked	30 October 2025	14th	(Serbia) Milutin Sredojević	18 November 2025
USM Khenchela	(Algeria) Djilali Bahloul	Mutual consent	11 November 2025	10th	(Tunisia) Mourad Okbi	17 November 2025
JS Saoura	(Algeria) Lotfi Boudraa	Resigned	11 November 2025	5th	(Algeria) Abdelkader Amrani	30 December 2025
ES Mostaganem	(Algeria) Nadhir Leknaoui	Mutual consent	12 November 2025	15th	(Tunisia) Hatem Missaoui	17 November 2025
CS Constantine	(Bosnia and Herzegovina) Rusmir Cviko	Resigned	5 December 2025	9th	(Tunisia) Lassaad Dridi	16 December 2025
MB Rouissat	(Algeria) Chérif Hadjar	Sacked	6 January 2026	11th	(Tunisia) Lassaad Maamar	7 February 2026
ASO Chlef	(Algeria) Fouad Bouali	Mutual consent	13 January 2026	14th	(Algeria) Abdelhaq Belaid	13 January 2026
MC El Bayadh	(Algeria) Mohamed Lacet	Sacked	16 January 2026	16th	(Algeria) Majdi El Kourdi	17 January 2026
Olympique Akbou	(Algeria) Lotfi Amrouche	Sacked	25 January 2026	8th	(Algeria) Amar Guerbi	30 January 2026
USM Alger	(Algeria) Abdelhak Benchikha	Mutual consent	27 January 2026	3rd	(Algeria) Tarek Hadj Adlane	27 January 2026
MC Oran	(Spain) Juan Carlos Garrido	Sacked	5 February 2026	8th	(Algeria) Tahar Chérif El-Ouazzani	5 February 2026
ES Mostaganem	(Tunisia) Hatem Missaoui	Sacked	5 February 2026	15th	(Algeria) Nadhir Leknaoui	18 February 2026
ES Sétif	(Serbia) Milutin Sredojević	Sacked	15 February 2026	13th	(Algeria) Lotfi Amrouche	15 February 2026
USM Khenchela	(Tunisia) Mourad Okbi	Sacked	19 February 2026	11th	(Algeria) Billel Dziri	19 February 2026
USM Alger	(Algeria) Tarek Hadj Adlane	End of caretaker spell	20 February 2026	9th	(Senegal) Lamine N'Diaye	20 February 2026
Paradou AC	(Tunisia) Sofiène Hidoussi	Sacked	27 February 2026	14th	(Algeria) Azzedine Aït Djoudi	6 March 2026
MC Alger	(South Africa) Rhulani Mokwena	Resigned	14 March 2026	1st	(Tunisia) Khaled Ben Yahia	15 March 2026
JS Kabylie	(Germany) Josef Zinnbauer	Sacked	19 March 2026	9th	(Algeria) Rabah Bensafi	21 March 2026
CR Belouizdad	(Germany) Sead Ramović	Sacked	28 March 2026	7th	(Algeria) Salim Sebaâ (c)	28 March 2026
CR Belouizdad	(Algeria) Salim Sebaâ	End of caretaker spell	20 April 2026	7th	(Algeria) Ishak Ali Moussa	20 April 2026
CS Constantine	(Tunisia) Lassaad Dridi	Mutual consent	30 April 2026	5th	(Algeria) Khaled Guerioune (c)	30 April 2026

=== Foreign players ===
Club	Player 1	Player 2	Player 3	Player 4	Players left during the season
ASO Chlef	(Liberia) Edward Ledlum	(Togo) Kokou Avotor	(Niger) Ismael Moussa		
CR Belouizdad	(Tunisia) Mohamed Ali Ben Hammouda	(Ivory Coast) Jean Charles Ahoua			(Albania) Endri Çekiçi (Albania) Redon Xhixha
CS Constantine	(Nigeria) Tosin Omoyele	(Senegal) Mélo Ndiaye	(Togo) Yawo Agbagno	(Rwanda) Djihad Bizimana	(Burkina Faso) Salifou Tapsoba
ES Ben Aknoun	(Ivory Coast) Mohamed Sylla				
ES Mostaganem					
ES Sétif	(Ghana) Salifu Mudasiru	(Gabon) Mick Omfia	(Republic of the Congo) Wilfrid Nkaya	(Ivory Coast) Daniel Gnahoua	(The Gambia) Gibril Sillah (Rwanda) Abeddy Biramahire
JS Kabylie	(Ivory Coast) Josaphat Arthur Bada	(Senegal) Babacar Sarr	(Angola) Jaredi Teixeira	(Chad) Célestin Ecua	
JS Saoura	(Nigeria) Sikiru Alimi	(Ivory Coast) Constant Wayou	(Ivory Coast) Guy Stéphane Bédi	(Nigeria) Anas Yusuf	(Ivory Coast) Semelo Gueï
MB Rouissat	(Ghana) Hamidu Fatawu	(Republic of the Congo) Djigo Saïkou	(Republic of the Congo) Julio Bandessi	(Republic of the Congo) Destaing Sikoula	(Mali) Siaka Bagayoko
MC Alger	(Burkina Faso) Mohamed Zougrana	(Guinea) Mohamed Saliou Bangoura	(Ivory Coast) Kipré Zunon	(Guinea) Alhassane Bangoura	
MC El Bayadh					
MC Oran	(Botswana) Gape Mohutsiwa	(Guinea) Ousmane Coumbassa	(Mali) Boubacar Traoré	(Guinea) Sékou Damaro Bangoura	(Ghana) Maxwell Baakoh (The Gambia) Pa Omar Jobe
Olympique Akbou	(Mali) Aly Desse Sissoko	(Tunisia) Hamdi Labidi			(Ivory Coast) Romaric Ouattara
Paradou AC	(Madagascar) Lalaïna Rafanomezantsoa	(Senegal) Moussa Sogué	(Ivory Coast) Abdoul Fatahou Ouattara	(Madagascar) Toky Rakotondraibe	(Ivory Coast) Samba Koné (Ivory Coast) Youssouf Dao
USM Alger	(Democratic Republic of the Congo) Glody Likonza	(Cameroon) Che Malone	(Senegal) Aimé Tendeng	(Ivory Coast) Dramane Kamagaté	(Liberia) Emmanuel Ernest
USM Khenchela	(Cameroon) Franck Etouga	(Gabon) Edlin Essang-Matouti	(Ivory Coast) Serge Badjo		(Democratic Republic of the Congo) Christopher Ngolo

== League table ==
Pos	Team	Pld	W	D	L	GF	GA	GD	Pts	Qualification or relegation
1	MC Alger (C)	30	20	5	5	41	18	+23	65	Qualification for CAF Champions League
2	JS Saoura	30	16	7	7	40	26	+14	55	Qualification for CAF Champions League
3	CR Belouizdad	30	14	11	5	47	24	+23	53	Qualification for CAF Confederation Cup
4	MC Oran	30	14	7	9	36	31	+5	49	
5	JS Kabylie	30	11	12	7	40	31	+9	45	
6	Olympique Akbou	30	12	9	9	34	31	+3	45	
7	USM Khenchela	30	12	8	10	37	37	0	44	
8	ES Ben Aknoun	30	11	10	9	41	39	+2	43	
9	CS Constantine	30	11	10	9	35	30	+5	43	
10	USM Alger (Note: USM Alger qualified for the 2026–27 CAF Confederation Cup by winning the 2025–26 Algerian Cup)	30	8	15	7	34	29	+5	39	Qualification for CAF Confederation Cup
11	ES Sétif	30	10	9	11	33	36	−3	39	
12	MB Rouissat	30	9	9	12	30	35	−5	36	
13	ASO Chlef	30	9	7	14	26	31	−5	34	
14	Paradou AC (R)	30	7	3	20	35	54	−19	24	Relegation to Algerian League 2
15	ES Mostaganem (R)	30	4	7	19	18	52	−34	19	Relegation to Algerian League 2
16	MC El Bayadh (R)	30	2	11	17	17	40	−23	17	Relegation to Algerian League 2

Source: lfp.dz
Rules for classification: 1) Points; 2) Head-to-head points; 3) Head-to-head goal difference; 4) First half goal difference; 5) First half total goals; 6) Fairplay ranking; 7) Playoff.
(C) Champions; (R) Relegated

== Results ==
Home \ Away	ASO	CRB	CSC	ESBA	ESM	ESS	JSK	JSS	MBR	MCA	MCEB	MCO	OA	PAC	USMA	USMK
ASO Chlef		0–1	0–2	1–2	1–0	1–0	1–2	0–1	1–1	0–0	2–0	1–0	1–0	2–0	2–1	1–2
CR Belouizdad	2–1		2–2	3–1	7–0	3–1	0–1	1–2	3–1	0–1	0–0	3–1	3–2	1–0	0–0	3–1
CS Constantine	2–2	0–0		0–0	2–1	2–0	1–0	1–0	2–0	2–0	1–1	0–1	2–1	2–0	1–1	2–2
ES Ben Aknoun	2–1	0–2	1–0		3–0	0–1	1–1	1–1	3–2	2–3	1–0	2–1	2–2	1–0	2–2	2–3
ES Mostaganem	0–1	0–2	2–0	0–1		1–0	2–2	0–4	1–1	0–5	2–2	0–0	1–0	3–2	2–2	0–3
ES Sétif	1–1	3–1	2–1	1–1	3–0		1–0	1–1	2–1	1–0	0–0	3–0	1–1	2–2	1–3	4–1
JS Kabylie	2–1	0–0	2–2	3–1	1–0	5–1		0–1	1–1	1–1	4–1	1–2	0–0	3–2	1–2	1–0
JS Saoura	1–0	0–0	3–1	1–0	3–2	1–0	2–2		1–2	2–1	2–1	2–0	3–2	1–2	1–0	3–0
MB Rouissat	1–1	1–1	1–2	0–0	1–0	3–0	1–1	1–0		1–0	1–0	1–3	1–1	2–1	1–0	2–0
MC Alger	2–0	2–1	1–0	1–0	1–0	2–0	0–0	1–0	1–1		3–0	3–2	2–1	2–1	1–0	2–1
MC El Bayadh	0–1	1–1	0–2	1–2	1–0	1–1	1–1	0–0	2–0	0–1		0–2	2–2	0–1	0–0	1–2
MC Oran	1–0	1–1	1–0	2–1	0–0	0–0	2–0	1–1	2–1	2–1	2–0		0–1	3–1	2–2	2–1
Olympique Akbou	2–1	0–1	1–0	1–1	1–0	1–0	1–1	1–0	2–1	0–1	1–0	1–0		4–3	1–1	1–1
Paradou AC	0–0	0–3	5–3	3–5	1–0	0–2	1–2	1–1	1–0	0–2	2–0	1–2	1–2		0–1	2–0
USM Alger	1–0	1–1	0–0	2–2	1–1	2–0	0–1	1–2	2–0	0–0	1–1	1–1	1–0	4–2		1–1
USM Khenchela	2–2	1–1	0–0	1–1	1–0	1–1	2–1	3–0	1–0	0–1	2–1	2–0	0–1	1–0	2–1	

Updated to match(es) played on 6 June 2026. Source: lfp.dz
Legend: Blue = home team win; Yellow = draw; Red = away team win.

== Clubs season-progress ==
Team ╲ Round	1	2	3	4	5	6	7	8	9	10	11	12	13	14	15	16	17	18	19	20	21	22	23	24	25	26	27	28	29	30
ASO Chlef	D	L	L	W	D	D	D	W	L	L	L	L	W	L	D	W	D	L	W	L	D	W	W	L	W	L	W	L	L	L
CR Belouizdad	L	W	D	L	D	D	D	W	W	W	D	W	W	D	L	L	W	W	L	D	D	W	D	W	W	D	W	W	W	D
CS Constantine	W	L	W	L	D	D	D	L	W	L	W	L	W	D	W	D	W	W	W	W	D	D	D	L	L	D	W	L	D	L
ES Ben Aknoun	L	D	L	W	D	D	W	W	D	L	W	L	D	W	D	W	L	L	W	L	L	W	D	W	D	W	L	D	W	D
ES Mostaganem	L	W	D	D	L	W	L	L	L	L	L	D	L	L	L	W	L	D	L	D	L	L	L	W	L	L	D	L	L	D
ES Sétif	D	D	D	W	L	L	D	L	L	W	D	D	W	L	D	W	L	D	L	W	W	L	W	L	D	L	W	L	W	W
JS Kabylie	L	D	D	L	W	D	W	W	D	W	L	D	L	W	W	W	W	D	L	D	D	W	L	L	D	D	D	W	W	D
JS Saoura	L	D	W	W	W	D	W	D	D	L	L	L	W	W	L	L	W	W	D	W	W	L	W	W	W	D	W	W	D	W
MB Rouissat	W	W	L	D	W	D	D	L	D	L	L	D	W	L	W	W	L	L	W	L	D	L	W	L	D	L	D	D	W	L
MC Alger	W	D	W	W	W	D	W	W	W	W	W	W	L	W	D	W	W	W	W	L	D	W	W	W	L	W	L	D	L	W
MC El Bayadh	L	L	D	L	D	D	L	L	L	L	L	L	L	L	W	D	W	D	L	D	D	L	D	L	D	L	L	L	D	D
MC Oran	W	L	D	W	L	W	L	D	W	W	W	D	L	D	D	L	L	D	W	W	W	W	L	W	W	W	L	W	L	D
Olympique Akbou	W	W	D	L	W	D	L	W	L	W	D	W	L	D	D	L	W	D	L	W	W	W	D	W	D	W	L	L	L	D
Paradou AC	D	L	L	L	L	L	L	L	W	W	W	W	L	W	D	L	L	L	L	L	L	L	L	L	L	D	W	W	L	L
USM Alger	W	D	W	D	L	D	D	W	W	W	D	D	D	D	D	L	L	W	L	L	D	D	L	W	L	D	D	D	W	D
USM Khenchela	D	W	D	D	D	D	W	L	L	L	W	W	W	D	L	L	D	L	W	W	L	L	W	L	W	W	L	W	D	W

Updated to match(es) played on 6 June 2026. Source: lfp.dz
W = Win; D = Draw; L = Lose

== Positions by round ==
Team ╲ Round	1	2	3	4	5	6	7	8	9	10	11	12	13	14	15	16	17	18	19	20	21	22	23	24	25	26	27	28	29	30
ASO Chlef	9	13	14	11	10	10	12	11	12	12	13	14	13	14	14	13	13	13	12	13	13	13	13	13	12	12	11	11	13	13
CR Belouizdad	11	7	8	12	12	11	13	10	6	5	5	5	2	2	2	3	3	2	3	3	4	3	5	4	3	4	3	3	3	3
CS Constantine	1	8	4	7	6	7	8	12	10	10	9	10	7	10	7	7	4	4	2	2	2	2	2	6	6	6	6	6	7	9
ES Ben Aknoun	12	11	13	13	13	12	9	6	8	9	7	8	11	9	10	5	9	9	9	9	10	10	8	8	8	7	8	9	8	8
ES Mostaganem	15	6	7	10	11	9	11	13	13	14	15	15	15	15	15	15	15	15	15	15	15	15	16	15	15	15	15	15	15	15
ES Sétif	7	10	9	8	9	14	14	14	14	13	12	13	12	13	13	12	12	12	13	12	12	12	12	12	13	13	12	13	12	11
JS Kabylie	13	12	12	14	14	13	10	7	9	6	6	7	9	8	5	2	2	3	4	5	7	6	7	7	7	8	7	7	5	5
JS Saoura	14	14	10	4	3	3	2	2	3	7	8	9	8	6	8	10	6	5	5	4	3	7	3	2	2	2	2	2	2	2
MB Rouissat	2	1	5	6	2	2	3	5	7	8	11	11	10	11	11	9	10	10	10	11	11	11	10	11	11	11	13	12	11	12
MC Alger	3	4	1	1	1	1	1	1	1	1	1	1	1	1	1	1	1	1	1	1	1	1	1	1	1	1	1	1	1	1
MC El Bayadh	16	16	16	16	15	15	15	15	16	16	16	16	16	16	16	16	16	16	16	16	16	16	15	16	16	16	16	16	16	16
MC Oran	4	9	11	3	7	5	6	9	4	3	2	2	4	4	4	6	8	8	7	6	5	4	6	5	4	3	4	4	4	4
Olympique Akbou	6	2	3	5	4	4	5	3	5	4	4	4	5	5	6	8	5	7	8	7	6	5	4	3	5	4	5	5	6	6
Paradou AC	10	15	15	15	16	16	16	16	15	15	14	12	14	12	12	14	14	14	14	14	14	14	14	14	14	14	14	14	14	14
USM Alger	5	5	2	2	5	6	7	4	2	2	3	3	3	3	3	4	7	6	6	9	8	9	11	9	10	10	10	10	10	10
USM Khenchela	8	3	6	9	8	8	4	8	11	11	10	6	6	7	9	11	11	11	11	8	9	10	9	10	9	9	9	8	9	7

Leader
2025–26 CAF Champions League
2025–26 CAF Confederation Cup
Relegation to Algerian League 2

Updated to match(es) played on 6 June 2026. Source: lfp.dz

== Season statistics ==
=== Top scorers ===
Rank	Goalscorer	Club	Goals
1	(Algeria) Aymen Mahious	JS Kabylie	14
2	(Algeria) Mohamed Ramdaoui	Paradou AC	10
2	(Guinea) Mohamed Saliou Bangoura	MC Alger	10
4	(Algeria) Khayreddine Merzougui	MB Rouissat	9
4	(Algeria) Merouane Zerrouki	ES Sétif	9
4	(Cameroon) Franck Etouga	USM Khenchela	9
4	(Tunisia) Mohamed Ali Ben Hammouda	CR Belouizdad	9

Updated to games played on 6 June 2026.
Source: lfp.dz

=== Hat-tricks ===
Player	For	Against	Result	Date	Ref
(Algeria) Badis Bouamama	ES Ben Aknoun	Paradou AC*	3–5	14 February 2026	
(Algeria) Aymen Mahious	JS Kabylie*	Paradou AC	3–2	6 March 2026	
(Guinea) Mohamed Saliou Bangoura^{4}	MC Alger	ES Mostaganem*	0–5	7 March 2026	
(Algeria) Abderaouf Benguit	CR Belouizdad*	ES Mostaganem	7–0	5 April 2026	
(Algeria) Mohamed Ramdaoui	Paradou AC*	CS Constantine	5–3	7 May 2026	
(Algeria) Aymen Mahious	JS Kabylie*	ES Sétif	5–1	8 May 2026	
(Algeria) Youcef Laouafi	CR Belouizdad*	ES Ben Aknoun	3–1	24 May 2026	
(Algeria) Ismail Saadi	JS Saoura*	CS Constantine	3–1	5 June 2026	

== Awards ==
=== Monthly awards ===
Month	Player of the Month		References
Month	Club	Player	References
September	(Algeria) Chakib Aoujane	MC Oran	
December	(Tunisia) Mohamed Ali Ben Hammouda	CR Belouizdad	
February	(Algeria) Gaya Merbah	JS Kabylie	
March	(Algeria) Abdelkader Menezla	MC Alger	
April	(Algeria) Ismaïl Saadi	JS Saoura	
May	(Algeria) Ismaïl Saadi	JS Saoura	

== See also ==
- 2025–26 Algerian League 2
- 2025–26 Algerian Cup
- 2025 Algerian Super Cup
- 2025-26 CAF Champions League
- 2025-26 CAF Confederation Cup
