= Mobilis =

Mobilis may refer to:

- ATM Mobilis, a mobile telephone operator in Algeria
- Mobilis (Vaud), a public transport tariff network in the Vaud canton of Switzerland
- Mobilis (automaker), a Brazilian micro EV maker
- Mobilis – Protectis Range, software for the Microsoft Tablet PC
- A trade name for the medication piroxicam
