= Mostapha Bott =

Algerian footballer (born 2004)

Personal information
- Full name: Mostapha Rezkallah Bott
- Date of birth: 21 July 2004 (age 22)
- Place of birth: Mascara, Algeria
- Height: 1.89 m (6 ft 2 in)
- Positions: Defensive midfielder; centre-back

Team information
- Current team: JS Kabylie
- Number: 4

Youth career
- –2022: GC Mascara
- 2023–2025: JS Kabylie

Senior career*
Years	Team	Apps	(Gls)
2022–2023	GC Mascara		
2025–	JS Kabylie	29	(3)
- * Club domestic league appearances and goals as of 21:10, 19 November 2026 (UTC)

Mostapha Rezkallah Bott (Arabic: مصطفى رزق الله بوط; Tamazight: ⵎⵓⵙⵜⴰⴼⴰ ⵔⴻⵣⴽⴰⵍⴰⵀ ⴱⵓⵜ; born 21 July 2004) is an Algerian professional footballer who plays as a defensive midfielder or centre-back for JS Kabylie.

== Personal life ==
Mostapha Bott is the nephew of former Algerian Ligue 1 footballer Abdelaziz Bott.

== Club career ==
On 1 August 2023, Mostapha Bott joined the U21 team of JS Kabylie.

On 10 May 2024, with the JS Kabylie U21 team, he won the Algerian League Cup U21 2023–24, against the ES Sétif U21 team.

On 4 January 2025, with the JS Kabylie U21 team, he won the Algerian Super Cup U21 2024, against the CR Belouizdad U21 team.

On 1 July 2025, he was promoted to the senior team of JS Kabylie, signing with the Kabyle club a contract until the end of the 2027–28 season.

On 20 September 2025, during the 2025–26 CAF Champions League, he made his professional debut with JS Kabylie, under the direction of German coach Josef Zinnbauer.

On 21 October 2025, in Ligue 1, with JS Kabylie, he scored his first professional goal.

== Honours ==
JS Kabylie U21

- Algerian League Cup U21: 2023–24
- Algerian Super Cup U21: 2024
