= 1tik =

Algerian focused social media platform

- Logo used since 2025.
- Developer: INTAJ Digital
- Release: 20 December 2025; 9 months ago
- Operating system: IOS; Android
- Available in: 4 languages
- List of languages: Arabic; Algerian Arabic; English; French
- Type: Application; Super app
- Website: 1tik.social

1tik, pronounced Antik (Arabic: أنتيك, lit. '"Everything is going well"') is a fully Algerian instant messaging, social media and mobile payment app. designed, developed and built locally by the Algerian start-up, INTAJ Digital, with backing from the state-owned company ATM Mobilis (who's the company's main sponsor).

It is described as Algeria's first super-app that is entirely designed and built by local developers.

== Etymology ==
The name "1tik" (Arabic: أنتيك) is drawn from the popular Algerian vernacular (Antik), the neologism, which appeared several years ago, means "everything is going well" or "it's all good".

== History ==
1tik was officially launched and announced 20 December 2025 by INTAJ Digital's founder Youcef Touileb and a team of 50 employees, making it the first ever Algerian instant messaging, social media and mobile payment app, rivaling with the growing influence of Yassir in Algeria. it grew in popularity after the presidency of Algeria and several other state-owned companies, medias, and ministries opened official accounts on the app.
