= Youcef Izem =

Algerian footballer (born 2007)

Personal information
- Date of birth: 19 February 2007 (age 19)
- Place of birth: Azazga, Algeria
- Height: 1.80 m (5 ft 11 in)
- Positions: Central midfielder; attacking midfielder

Team information
- Current team: JS Kabylie
- Number: 15

Youth career
- –2019: AS Freha
- 2019–2025: JS Kabylie

Senior career*
Years	Team	Apps	(Gls)
2025–	JS Kabylie	13	(1)

International career^{‡}
2024	Algeria U17	3	(0)
2025–	Algeria U20	?	(?)
2026	Algeria U21	5	(0)
Medal record
Men's football
Representing Algeria
Mediterranean Games
Gold medal – first place	2026 Taranto	Team
- * Club domestic league appearances and goals as of 21:13, 19 November 2026 (UTC) ‡ National team caps and goals as of 22:00, 30 September 2026 (UTC)

Youcef Izem (Tamazight: ⵢⵓⵙⴻⴼ ⵉⵣⴻⵎ; born 19 February 2007) is an Algerian professional footballer who plays as a central midfielder or attacking midfielder for JS Kabylie.

== Club career ==
Youcef Izem was born in Azazga, Tizi Ouzou Province, Kabylia region, Algeria. Izem is from the village of Alma Bouamane, in Timizart, Ouaguenoune District, Tizi Ouzou Province.

In 2019, at the age of 12, he joined the youth categories of JS Kabylie, under the presidency of Cherif Mellal.

On 4 January 2025, with the JS Kabylie U21 team, he won the Algerian Super Cup U21 2024, against the CR Belouizdad U21 team.

On 1 July 2025, he was promoted to the senior team of JS Kabylie, signing a contract until the end of the 2028–29 season.

On 3 November 2025, under the leadership of German coach Josef Zinnbauer, in Ligue 1, Izem made his professional debut with JS Kabylie.

On 24 January 2026, under the direction of coach Zinnbauer, Izem gained his first continental club experience with JSK, playing in a match of the 2025–26 CAF Champions League group stage.

On 8 May 2026, under the direction of coach Rabah Bensafi, in Ligue 1, with JS Kabylie, Izem scored his first professional goal.

== International career ==
At the international level, Youcef Izem played for the Algeria U17 and the Algeria U20.

In August 2026, he was selected by Brahim Hemdani to participate in the 2026 Mediterranean Games, with the Algeria U21 team. He won the gold medal with the team.

== Honours ==
JS Kabylie U21

- Algerian Super Cup U21: 2024

Algeria U21

- Mediterranean Games: 2026
