= Boukhalfa =

Village in Algeria

Coordinates: 36.732°N 4.020°E

Boukhalfa (Arabic: بوخالفة and Kabyle: Buxalfa) is a town in the commune of Tizi Ouzou, Algeria, located in the northwest of the city.

The Law department at the Mouloud Mammeri University of Tizi-Ouzou is located in the town.

It's the location of the new stadium of JS Kabylie.

== History ==
Until 1857, the town of Tizi Ouzou remained a strategic point of support in the Kabyle region for the French settlement, notably for the hamlet of Boukhalfa, located 4 kilometers north-west of Tizi Ouzou on the road of " Alger.

Attached to the commune of Tizi Ouzou, this hamlet of Boukhalfa is located in the valley of the Sebaou, below the djebel Sidi Belloua.

It was as of August 1872 that the first Alsatian-Lorrain colonists arrived to settle in Boukhalfa.

These settlers succeeded in draining the swamps of Boukhalfa to cultivate the land and practice the viticulture there.

However decimated by fevers, many will be those, who as soon as the repayment of their debts will resell their lot.

By 1886 there were only four families of Alsace-Lorraine left in Boukhalfa.

On December 14, 1888, the repopulation of the hamlet of Boukhalfa had made it possible to increase its population to 48 French families for a total population of 125 inhabitants.

Around 1890, the hamlet of Boukhalfa had a very small territory and a small number of French settlers, which slowed down the continuation of its expansion.

The hamlet of Boukhalfa in March 1889 included a fort and a garrison, and where the French colonists from all the environs of Tizi Ouzou found there a safe shelter in case of danger coming from Mount Sidi Belloua.

In 1901, still attached to the commune of Tizi Ouzou, the village of Boukhalfa was administered by Mr. Hygonnet, deputy municipal councilor.
