= Mohamed Idir Hadid =

Algerian footballer (born 2002)

Mohamed Idir Hadid ⵎⵓⵀⴰⵎⴻⴷ ⵉⴷⵉⵔ ⵀⴰⴷⵉⴷ
Personal information
- Full name: Mohamed Idir Hadid
- Date of birth: 26 April 2002 (age 24)
- Place of birth: Aït Douala, Algeria
- Height: 1.82 m (6 ft 0 in)
- Position: Goalkeeper

Team information
- Current team: USM Alger
- Number: 16

Youth career
- ASCAB Ait Bouyahia
- ABC Foot Tizi-Ouzou
- –2019: JS Kabylie

Senior career*
Years	Team	Apps	(Gls)
2019–2026	JS Kabylie	66	(0)
2026–	USM Alger	0	(0)

International career^{‡}
2022–2025	Algeria U23		
2025–	Algeria A'	1	(0)
- * Club domestic league appearances and goals as of 13 July 2026 ‡ National team caps and goals as of 13 October 2025

Mohamed Idir Hadid (Arabic: محمد إيدير حديد; Tamazight: ⵎⵓⵀⴰⵎⴻⴷ ⵉⴷⵉⵔ ⵀⴰⴷⵉⴷ; born 26 April 2002) is an Algerian professional footballer who plays as a goalkeeper for USM Alger.

== Club career ==
Mohamed Idir Hadid was born in Aït Douala, Tizi Ouzou, Kabylia, Algeria.

In July 2019, he was promoted to the senior team of JS Kabylie.

In December 2020, he played his first game, with the senior team of JSK, during the 2020–21 CAF Confederation Cup.

On 13 July 2026, he joined USM Alger.

== Career statistics ==
=== Club ===
As of 19 September 2026

Appearances and goals by club, season and competition
Club	Season	League			National cup		Continental		Other		Total	
Club	Season	Division	Apps	Goals	Apps	Goals	Apps	Goals	Apps	Goals	Apps	Goals
JS Kabylie	2019–20	Ligue 1	0	0	0	0	0 (Note: All appearance(s) in Champions League)	0	—		0	0
JS Kabylie	2020–21	Ligue 1	11	0	—		2 (Note: All appearance(s) in Confederation Cup)	0	—		13	0
JS Kabylie	2021–22	Ligue 1	1	0	—		0	0	0	0	1	0
JS Kabylie	2022–23	Ligue 1	10	0	—		1	0	—		11	0
JS Kabylie	2023–24	Ligue 1	9	0	1	0	—		—		10	0
JS Kabylie	2024–25	Ligue 1	25	0	2	0	—		—		27	0
JS Kabylie	2025–26	Ligue 1	10	0	—		6	0	—		16	0
JS Kabylie	Total		66	0	3	0	9	0	—		78	0
USM Alger	2026–27	Ligue 1	0	0	0	0	0	0	0 (Note: All appearances in Algerian Super Cup)	0	0	0
USM Alger	Total		0	0	0	0	0	0	0	0	0	0
Career total			66	0	3	0	9	0	0	0	78	0

== Honours ==
JS Kabylie

- Algerian League Cup: 2020–21
- CAF Confederation Cup runner-up: 2020–21

USM Alger

- CAF Super Cup: 2026
