= Football at the 2026 Mediterranean Games – Men's team squads =

Below are the squads for the Football at the 2026 Mediterranean Games, hosted in Taranto, Italy, and took place between 21 August and 5 September 2026. Teams were a mix of national U18, U20, and U21 sides.

== Group A ==
=== Morocco U20 ===
Coach: (France) Ludovic Batelli

No.	Pos.	Player	Date of birth (age)	Club
1	GK	Rayan Azouagh	3 June 2007 (aged 19)	(Royal Spanish Football Federation) Sevilla C
2	MF	Hamza Bouhaddi	7 October 2008 (aged 17)	(Royal Moroccan Football Federation) FUS Rabat
4	FW	Abderrahman Arkid	14 December 2007 (aged 18)	(Royal Moroccan Football Federation) FUS Rabat
5	MF	Yassine Zouhir	8 June 2008 (aged 18)	(Royal Moroccan Football Federation) FAR Rabat
6	MF	Benjamin Khaderi	1 August 2007 (aged 19)	(Royal Dutch Football Association) PSV
7	FW	Hamza Raji	9 October 2007 (aged 18)	(Royal Moroccan Football Federation) RS Berkane
8	FW	Mohamed Mounssef	12 June 2008 (aged 18)	(Royal Moroccan Football Federation) Wydad AC
9	FW	Karim Essaadi	19 September 2007 (aged 18)	(Royal Moroccan Football Federation) Raja CA
10	MF	Yahya Iguiz	23 December 2008 (aged 17)	(Royal Moroccan Football Federation) Raja CA
11	FW	Abdelghafour Gourari	7 April 2008 (aged 18)	(Royal Moroccan Football Federation) RS Berkane
13	MF	Khalid Kasbi	16 May 2007 (aged 19)	(Royal Moroccan Football Federation) UTS Rabat
14	MF	Bilal Soukrat	24 March 2008 (aged 18)	(Royal Moroccan Football Federation) RS Berkane
15	MF	Youssef Jamal	4 May 2007 (aged 19)	(Royal Moroccan Football Federation) Mohammed VI FA
16	MF	Anass Benomar	5 April 2008 (aged 18)	(Royal Moroccan Football Federation) Raja CA
17	DF	Ali Bahraouy	12 October 2008 (aged 17)	(Royal Moroccan Football Federation) Mohammed VI FA
19	MF	Rayan Zinebi Talbi	18 March 2007 (aged 19)	(Royal Spanish Football Federation) Recreativo Granada
21	FW	Abdelali Eddaoudi	13 December 2008 (aged 17)	(Royal Moroccan Football Federation) FUS Rabat
22	GK	Saad Antra	18 August 2007 (aged 19)	(Royal Moroccan Football Federation) Raja CA

=== North Macedonia U20 ===
Coach: (North Macedonia) Aleksandar Tanevski

No.	Pos.	Player	Date of birth (age)	Club
1	GK	Stefan Jovanoski	17 February 2006 (aged 20)	(Football Association of the Czech Republic) Mlada Boleslav
2	DF	Zlatko Radeski	17 June 2007 (aged 19)	(Football Federation of Macedonia) Teteks
3	DF	Andrej Velkov	7 February 2006 (aged 20)	(Football Federation of Macedonia) AP Brera Strumica
4	DF	Adis Murati	10 May 2006 (aged 20)	(Football Federation of Macedonia) Bashkimi
5	DF	Luka Atanasovski	24 April 2007 (aged 19)	(Football Federation of Macedonia) Teteks
6	MF	Emir Shabotikj	3 October 2007 (aged 18)	(Football Federation of Macedonia) Detonit Plachkovica
7	FW	David Mateski	15 August 2006 (aged 20)	(Football Federation of Macedonia) Ohrid
8	MF	Harun Nezirovski	25 February 2007 (aged 19)	(Swedish Football Association) Helsingborgs IF
9	FW	Salim Arifi	19 September 2006 (aged 19)	(Football Federation of Kosovo) Mitrovica
10	MF	Nikola Manojlov	1 February 2006 (aged 20)	(Football Federation of Macedonia) Sileks
11	FW	Marko Nikolovski	10 February 2006 (aged 20)	(Football Federation of Macedonia) Sileks
12	GK	David Iloski	10 November 2007 (aged 18)	(Football Federation of Macedonia) AP Brera Strumica
13	MF	Viktor Delov	16 November 2007 (aged 18)	(Football Federation of Macedonia) Belasica
14	MF	Luka Bojadjiev	1 December 2006 (aged 19)	(Football Federation of Macedonia) Bregalnica Štip
15	MF	Darijan Tasev	25 August 2006 (aged 19)	(Football Federation of Macedonia) Bregalnica Štip
16	MF	David Golubov	11 July 2006 (aged 20)	(Football Federation of Macedonia) Detonit Plachkovica
17	MF	Andrej Stojanovski	15 August 2006 (aged 20)	(Football Federation of Macedonia) Skopje

=== Tunisia U21 ===
Coach: (Tunisia) Anis Boujelbene

No.	Pos.	Player	Date of birth (age)	Club
1	GK	Rayen Besbes	4 August 2005 (aged 21)	(Tunisian Football Federation) US Monastir
2	DF	Alaeddine Derbali	19 May 2005 (aged 21)	(Tunisian Football Federation) ES Tunis
3	DF	Youssef Herch	2 November 2005 (aged 20)	(Tunisian Football Federation) US Monastir
4	DF	Rayan Boukadida	23 January 2007 (aged 19)	(French Football Federation) Le Mans
5	DF	Mohamed Amine Allala	16 February 2005 (aged 21)	(Tunisian Football Federation) CA Bizertin
6	MF	Haietem Dhaou	12 January 2005 (aged 21)	(Tunisian Football Federation) ES Tunis
7	MF	Zineddine Kada	1 August 2005 (aged 21)	(Tunisian Football Federation) ES Tunis
8	MF	Hamza Labidi	12 May 2006 (aged 20)	(Tunisian Football Federation) Club Africain
9	FW	Walid Dhouib	1 August 2006 (aged 20)	(Lithuanian Football Federation) Sūduva
10	FW	Rayen Chaaben	30 January 2006 (aged 20)	(Tunisian Football Federation) CS Sfaxien
11	FW	Mohamed Yasine Chaabani	2 August 2007 (aged 19)	(Tunisian Football Federation) ES Sahel
12	DF	Slim Khadhraoui	27 September 2006 (aged 19)	(Tunisian Football Federation) ES Sahel
13	FW	Chamseddine Jraid	13 January 2007 (aged 19)	(Tunisian Football Federation) Stade Tunisien
14	FW	Fares Bousnina	13 February 2006 (aged 20)	(Italian Football Federation) Bologna
15	FW	Amen Allah Hmidhi	12 June 2006 (aged 20)	(Tunisian Football Federation) ES Tunis
16	GK	Mohamed Mootaz Hanzouli	7 September 2005 (aged 20)	(Tunisian Football Federation) CA Bizertin
17	MF	Mohamed Rayen Anene	15 August 2006 (aged 20)	(Tunisian Football Federation) ES Sahel
18	DF	Mohamed Rayen Rhimi	31 December 2005 (aged 20)	(Tunisian Football Federation) ES Sahel

=== Turkey U20 ===
Coach: (Turkey) Uğur İnceman

No.	Pos.	Player	Date of birth (age)	Club
1	GK	Onuralp Çevikkan	2 January 2006 (aged 20)	(Turkish Football Federation) Trabzonspor
2	DF	Oğuzhan Yılmaz	2 July 2006 (aged 20)	(Turkish Football Federation) Trabzonspor
3	DF	Ömer Arda Kara	31 October 2007 (aged 18)	(Turkish Football Federation) Erzurumspor
4	DF	Taha Emre İnce	26 July 2007 (aged 19)	(Turkish Football Federation) Pendikspor
5	DF	Muhammed İyyad Kadıoğlu	1 January 2007 (aged 19)	(Turkish Football Federation) Fatih Karagümrük
6	DF	Veis Yıldız	2 March 2006 (aged 20)	(Italian Football Federation) Hellas Verona
7	DF	Berkay Aslan	5 January 2007 (aged 19)	(Turkish Football Federation) İstanbul Başakşehir
8	DF	Ege Arslan	20 January 2006 (aged 20)	(Turkish Football Federation) Bodrum
9	DF	Özder Özcan	19 April 2007 (aged 19)	(Turkish Football Federation) Iğdır
10	DF	Berat Luş	20 April 2007 (aged 19)	(Turkish Football Federation) Galatasaray
11	DF	Tuğra Turhan	9 August 2007 (aged 19)	(Turkish Football Federation) İstanbul Başakşehir
12	GK	Görkem Cihan	14 August 2006 (aged 20)	(Turkish Football Federation) MKE Ankaragücü
13	DF	Miraç Şimşek	16 February 2007 (aged 19)	(Turkish Football Federation) MKE Ankaragücü
15	DF	Devran Bozardıç	31 January 2006 (aged 20)	(Turkish Football Federation) Batman Petrolspor
16	MF	Emre Gökay	18 February 2006 (aged 20)	(Turkish Football Federation) Sivasspor
17	DF	İsmail Esat Buğa	8 August 2006 (aged 20)	(Turkish Football Federation) Konyaspor
18	FW	Naim Saruhan Dönmez	7 April 2006 (aged 20)	(Turkish Football Federation) 1461 Trabzon

== Group B ==
=== Albania U21 ===
Coach: (Albania) Alban Bushi

No.	Pos.	Player	Date of birth (age)	Club
1	GK	Skander Tahri	3 January 2005 (aged 21)	(Albanian Football Federation) Partizani
2	DF	Valentin Daja	17 February 2006 (aged 20)	(Albanian Football Federation) Besa
3	DF	Antonis Dama	19 January 2006 (aged 20)	Free agent
4	DF	Aurel Marku	13 January 2005 (aged 21)	(Albanian Football Federation) Bylisi
5	DF	Kevi Mejdani	13 February 2005 (aged 21)	(Albanian Football Federation) Kukësi
6	MF	Jordi Jaku	27 March 2006 (aged 20)	(Italian Football Federation) Bologna U20
7	FW	Kristi Bespallov	13 January 2005 (aged 21)	(Albanian Football Federation) Kukësi
8	MF	Ersi Bode	16 February 2006 (aged 20)	(Royal Dutch Football Association) ADO U21
9	FW	Nebi Qokthi	16 August 2006 (aged 20)	(Albanian Football Federation) Partizani
10	FW	Emiljano Mihana	18 March 2008 (aged 18)	(Albanian Football Federation) Vora
11	FW	Hetem Lushaj	17 October 2007 (aged 18)	(Albanian Football Federation) Flamurtari
12	GK	Amarildo Dervishaj	8 April 2006 (aged 20)	(Albanian Football Federation) Kukësi
13	DF	Renato Halili	25 October 2007 (aged 18)	(Albanian Football Federation) Vora
14	MF	Orgito Ruçi	10 March 2005 (aged 21)	(Albanian Football Federation) Vora
15	DF	Rajmond Marinaj	23 November 2006 (aged 19)	(Albanian Football Federation) Vora
16	MF	Oresti Kasmollari	3 June 2005 (aged 21)	(Albanian Football Federation) Kastrioti
17	MF	Bjorni Duka	14 October 2007 (aged 18)	(Albanian Football Federation) Egnatia
18	DF	Arlind Leshi	1 December 2005 (aged 20)	(Albanian Football Federation) Bylisi

=== Algeria U21 ===
Coach: (Algeria) Brahim Hemdani

No.	Pos.	Player	Date of birth (age)	Club
1	GK	Mohammed El Koubi	19 July 2007 (aged 19)	(Algerian Football Federation) Paradou AC
3	DF	Mohamed Faiz Belgourai	13 April 2005 (aged 21)	(Algerian Football Federation) MB Rouissat
4	DF	Issam Abdelhamid Naim	21 December 2005 (aged 20)	(Algerian Football Federation) ES Sétif
5	DF	Daniel Ilyès Mahdid	8 June 2007 (aged 19)	(Algerian Football Federation) MC Algiers
6	MF	Houssam Alla Eddine Abdelaziz	31 August 2007 (aged 18)	(Algerian Football Federation) Paradou AC
7	FW	Ben Ahmed Kohili	11 July 2005 (aged 21)	(Algerian Football Federation) MC Algiers
8	FW	Houssem Tarzout	19 January 2007 (aged 19)	(Algerian Football Federation) Paradou AC
9	FW	Moslem Anatouf	8 May 2006 (aged 20)	(Algerian Football Federation) MC Algiers
10	MF	Abdelmalek Kelalech	26 July 2005 (aged 21)	(Algerian Football Federation) CR Belouizdad
11	FW	Lahlou Akhrib	24 April 2005 (aged 21)	(Algerian Football Federation) JS Kabylie
12	DF	Haithem Elkouacheur	3 January 2007 (aged 19)	(Algerian Football Federation) CR Belouizdad
13	DF	Walid Kourdi	20 September 2005 (aged 20)	(Algerian Football Federation) USM Alger
14	MF	Salah Eddine Bouziani	21 January 2006 (aged 20)	(Algerian Football Federation) USM Alger
15	MF	Youcef Izem	19 February 2007 (aged 19)	(Algerian Football Federation) JS Kabylie
16	GK	Yasser Zitouni	3 April 2005 (aged 21)	(Algerian Football Federation) USM Khenchela
17	DF	Abdelouahab Satta	9 October 2006 (aged 19)	(Algerian Football Federation) MC Algiers
18	FW	Mohamed Bouderbala	6 July 2005 (aged 21)	(Algerian Football Federation) USM Alger

=== Italy U18 ===
Coach: (Italy) Daniele Franceschini

No.	Pos.	Player	Date of birth (age)	Club
1	GK	Mattia Sonzogni	30 July 2009 (aged 17)	(Italian Football Federation) Atalanta
2	DF	Lorenzo Dattilo	5 May 2010 (aged 16)	(Italian Football Federation) Roma
3	DF	Matteo Albini	4 March 2009 (aged 17)	(Italian Football Federation) Como
4	DF	Djibril Diallo	9 March 2009 (aged 17)	(Italian Football Federation) Parma
5	DF	Davide Gaffurini	24 April 2009 (aged 17)	(Italian Football Federation) Torino
6	DF	Andrea Donato	14 January 2009 (aged 17)	(Italian Football Federation) Inter Milan
7	FW	Jacopo Landi	26 February 2009 (aged 17)	(Italian Football Federation) Empoli
8	FW	Francesco Olivieri	22 April 2010 (aged 16)	(Italian Football Federation) Empoli
9	FW	Diego Perillo	17 March 2009 (aged 17)	(Italian Football Federation) Atalanta
10	FW	Thomas Corigliano	20 January 2009 (aged 17)	(Italian Football Federation) Juventus
11	FW	Edoardo Dario Rocca	26 October 2009 (aged 16)	(Italian Football Federation) Inter Milan
12	GK	Christian Lupo	29 May 2009 (aged 17)	(Italian Football Federation) Lecce
14	DF	Davide Rigo	2 April 2009 (aged 17)	(Italian Football Federation) Juventus
16	MF	Francesco Ballarin	21 July 2009 (aged 17)	(Italian Football Federation) Roma
18	MF	Nana Jeffrey Baffoh	2 April 2009 (aged 17)	(Italian Football Federation) Sassuolo
19	FW	Tommaso Casagrande	19 January 2009 (aged 17)	(Italian Football Federation) Hellas Verona
20	MF	Gioele Giammattei	20 May 2009 (aged 17)	(Italian Football Federation) Roma
21	MF	Mattia Guaglianone	8 April 2010 (aged 16)	(Italian Football Federation) Roma

=== Kosovo U21 ===
Coach: (Kosovo) Hekuran Kryeziu

No.	Pos.	Player	Date of birth (age)	Club
1	GK	Miran Qela	13 December 2006 (aged 19)	Free agent
2	MF	Diart Gashi	3 February 2008 (aged 18)	(German Football Association) Hertha BSC U19
3	DF	Dejvid Kabashi	6 August 2006 (aged 20)	Free agent
4	DF	Leart Salihu	14 February 2007 (aged 19)	(Swiss Football Association) Servette U21
5	DF	Gentrit Hetemaj	23 February 2007 (aged 19)	(Football Federation of Kosovo) Llapi
6	MF	Rrezon Gashi	11 February 2006 (aged 20)	(Football Federation of Kosovo) Vushtrria
7	FW	Rin Ahmeti	9 August 2008 (aged 18)	(Football Federation of Kosovo) Prishtina
8	MF	Elvaris Suplja	28 February 2006 (aged 20)	(Italian Football Federation) Cavese
9	FW	Edor Hajdini	1 February 2007 (aged 19)	(Football Association of Finland) Inter Turku II
10	MF	Adem Imeri	13 February 2006 (aged 20)	(German Football Association) Greuther Fürth II
11	FW	Lorik Mehmeti	5 June 2008 (aged 18)	(Football Federation of Kosovo) Prishtina
12	GK	Lindsay Gutaj	15 February 2007 (aged 19)	(German Football Association) 1. FC Nürnberg II
13	DF	Floni Selimi	15 April 2007 (aged 19)	Free agent
14	MF	Engjëll Krasniqi	21 March 2007 (aged 19)	Free agent
15	DF	Donart Syla	5 August 2006 (aged 20)	(Football Federation of Kosovo) Liria Prizren
16	MF	Omer Shala	4 September 2008 (aged 17)	(Football Federation of Kosovo) 2 Korriku
17	FW	Adam Hasani	5 September 2008 (aged 17)	(Italian Football Federation) Grosseto
18	FW	Oniks Grezda	27 August 2007 (aged 18)	(Football Federation of Kosovo) Drita
