= Reda Benchaa =

Algerian footballer (born 2002)

Reda Benchaa ⵔⴻⴷⴰ ⴱⴻⵏⵙⵀⴰ
Personal information
- Full name: Reda Mohamed Amine Benchaa
- Date of birth: 12 March 2002 (age 24)
- Place of birth: Le Blanc-Mesnil, France
- Height: 1.89 m (6 ft 2 in)
- Position: Centre-back

Team information
- Current team: JS Kabylie
- Number: 28

Youth career
- SC Dugny
- –2017: Red Star
- 2017–2020: Dijon

Senior career*
| Years | Team | Apps | (Gls) |
| 2020–2022 | Dijon B | 30 | (6) |
| 2022–2023 | Dijon | 4 | (0) |
| 2024–2025 | Kazma SC | | |
| 2025– | JS Kabylie | 29 | (1) |

International career^{‡}
| 2022 | Algeria U20 | 2 | (0) |
| 2022 | Algeria U23 | 2 | (0) |
| 2025 | Algeria A' | 1 | (0) |
- * Club domestic league appearances and goals as of 21:09, 19 November 2026 (UTC) ‡ National team caps and goals as of 13 October 2025

Reda Mohamed Amine Benchaa (Arabic: رضا محمد أمين بن شاعة; Tamazight: ⵔⴻⴷⴰ ⵎⵓⵀⴰⵎⴻⴷ ⴰⵎⵉⵏⴻ ⴱⴻⵏⵙⵀⴰ; born 12 March 2002) is a professional footballer who plays as a centre-back for JS Kabylie. Born in France, he has represented Algeria internationally.

== Club career ==
Benchaa is a youth product of the academy of Red Star, and moved to Dijon's youth sides in May 2017. He debuted with their reserves in 2020. He made his professional and Ligue 2 debut with Dijon in a 2–1 loss to Nîmes on 8 January 2022. On 16 March 2022, Benchaa signed his first professional contract with Dijon for 3 years.

Originally from Tizi Ouzou in Kabylia, on 5 February 2025, Benchaa signed with JS Kabylie, until the end of the 2026–27 season. On 21 June 2025, Benchaa scored a decisive goal for JSK, on the last day of the 2024–25 Algerian Ligue 1, at the Hocine Aït Ahmed Stadium of Tizi Ouzou, in a 1–0 victory, against ASO Chlef. With this winning goal in the 16th minute of the match, he secured the Kabyle club a spot in the 2025–26 CAF Champions League.

== International career ==
Benchaa holds French and Algerian nationalities. He captained the Algeria U23s at the 2022 Maurice Revello Tournament.

== Honours ==
Kazma SC

- Kuwait Super Cup runner-up: 2023–24
