= Lahlou Akhrib =

Algerian footballer (born 2005)

Lahlou Akhrib ⵍⴰⵀⵍⵓ ⴰⴽⵔⵉⴱ
Personal information
- Full name: Lahlou Akhrib
- Date of birth: 24 April 2005 (age 21)
- Place of birth: Draa Kebila, Algeria
- Height: 1.73 m (5 ft 8 in)
- Position: Winger

Team information
- Current team: JS Kabylie
- Number: 11

Youth career
- –2018: CS Ithri Lemroudj
- 2018–2019: USM Sétif
- 2019–2024: JS Kabylie

Senior career*
Years	Team	Apps	(Gls)
2024–	JS Kabylie	69	(5)

International career^{‡}
2020–2022	Algeria U17		
2022	Algeria U18	1	(0)
2022–2024	Algeria U20	6	(2)
2026	Algeria U21	5	(2)
2026–	Algeria U23	5	(2)
2025	Algeria A'	5	(0)
Medal record
Men's football
Representing Algeria
Mediterranean Games
Gold medal – first place	2026 Taranto	Team
- * Club domestic league appearances and goals as of 21:11, 19 November 2026 (UTC) ‡ National team caps and goals as of 19:07, 16 November 2026 (UTC)

Lahlou Akhrib (Kabyle: Leḥlu Axṛib; Tamazight: ⵍⴰⵀⵍⵓ ⴰⴽⵔⵉⴱ; born 24 April 2005) is an Algerian professional footballer who plays as a winger for JS Kabylie.

== Club career ==
Living in Ait Wartilan, Sétif, Algeria, Lahlou Akhrib is from the Kabyle village of Lemroudj, in Draa Kebila, Hammam Guergour, Sétif, Algeria.

In 2019, at the age of 14, he joined the youth categories of JS Kabylie, under the presidency of Cherif Mellal.

On 18 June 2023, with the JS Kabylie U21 team, during a match of the 2022–23 Algerian U21 Championship, he became the first goalscorer of the Hocine Aït Ahmed Stadium of Tizi Ouzou.

In July 2023, he signed his first professional contract with JS Kabylie on a four-season deal.

Akhrib made his professional debut, in Ligue 1, with JS Kabylie, in January 2024, under the direction of Portuguese coach Rui Almeida.

In May 2024, with the JS Kabylie U21 team, he won the Algerian League Cup U21 2023–24, against the ES Sétif U21 team.

In June 2024, in Ligue 1, at the 1 November 1954 Stadium of Tizi Ouzou, he scored his first professional goal, with JS Kabylie.

In August 2026, he extended his contract with JS Kabylie until June 2028.

== International career ==
Lahlou Akhrib played for the Algeria U18 football team at the 2022 Mediterranean Games.

In April 2025, he was called by Madjid Bougherra to play a decisive double confrontation against Gambia, with the Algeria A' football team, as part of the second round of the qualifiers, for the 2024 CHAN.

In July 2025, he was selected by Madjid Bougherra to participate in the 2024 CHAN, with the Algeria A' football team.

In August 2026, he was selected by Brahim Hemdani to participate in the 2026 Mediterranean Games, with the Algeria U21 team. He won the gold medal with the team.

== Honours ==
JS Kabylie U21

- Algerian League Cup U21: 2023–24

Algeria U21

- Mediterranean Games: 2026

Individual

- DZBEST Algerian Prospect of the Year: 2024
