= Jaredi Teixeira =

Angolan footballer (born 1998)

Personal information
- Full name: Jaredi Lopes Teixeira
- Date of birth: 11 November 1998 (age 27)
- Place of birth: Luanda, Angola
- Height: 1.65 m (5 ft 5 in)
- Position: Winger

Youth career
- –2017: Academia de Futebol de Angola

Senior career*
Years	Team	Apps	(Gls)
2018–2019	Recreativo do Libolo	24	(4)
2019–2021	Interclube de Luanda	34	(4)
2021–2026	Petro de Luanda	80	(12)
2025–2026	→ Interclube de Luanda (loan)	8	(0)
2026	JS Kabylie	12	(0)

International career^{‡}
2019–	Angola	9	(1)
- * Club domestic league appearances and goals as of 19 July 2026 ‡ National team caps and goals as of 28 December 2024

Jaredi Lopes Teixeira (born 11 November 1998) is an Angolan professional footballer who plays as a winger for the Angola national football team.

== Club career ==
Teixeira played in the Girabola for Recreativo do Libolo and Interclube de Luanda before joining Petro de Luanda in 2021. He won the double in his first season with Petro de Luanda. In the 2022–23 Girabola, he scored in the decisive match against Académica do Lobito that helped Petro de Luanda win another league title. He also performed well in African continental competitions, and there were reports about him being noticed by Moroccan clubs.

On 22 January 2026, Teixeira joined JS Kabylie until the end of the 2027–28 season. On 19 July 2026, he was released by JS Kabylie.

== International career ==
Teixeira made his debut for Angola in 2019, during the 2020 African Nations Championship qualification. He scored his first international goal during the 2022 African Nations Championship qualification against South Africa, and contested the 2022 African Nations Championship.

== Honours ==
Interclube de Luanda

- Angola Cup runner-up: 2020–21

Petro de Luanda

- Girabola: 2021–22, 2022–23, 2023–24, 2024–25
- Angola Cup: 2021–22, 2022–23, 2023–24
- Angola Super Cup: 2023–24, 2024–25
- Angola Super Cup runner-up: 2021–22, 2022–23
