= Josaphat Arthur Bada =

Ivorian footballer (born 2002)

Personal information
- Date of birth: 7 August 2002 (age 24)
- Place of birth: Akakro, Bongouanou, Ivory Coast
- Height: 1.74 m (5 ft 9 in)
- Positions: Central midfielder; attacking midfielder

Team information
- Current team: JS Kabylie
- Number: 8

Youth career
- 2014–2021: Deportivo Football Academy
- 2019–2020: → Stade d'Abidjan (loan)

Senior career*
Years	Team	Apps	(Gls)
2021–2024	ASEC Mimosas	?	(?)
2024–2025	Singida Black Stars FC	28	(4)
2025–	JS Kabylie	32	(0)

International career^{‡}
2022	Ivory Coast U23	0	(0)
- * Club domestic league appearances and goals as of 17:31, 30 October 2026 (UTC) ‡ National team caps and goals as of 29 October 2022

Josaphat Arthur Bada (born 7 August 2002) is an Ivorian professional footballer who plays as a central midfielder or attacking midfielder for JS Kabylie.

== Club career ==
In October 2021, Josaphat Arthur Bada signed his first professional contract with ASEC Mimosas.

In July 2024, he joined Singida Black Stars FC.

On 27 July 2025, Bada joined JS Kabylie, signing a three-year contract with the Kabyle club.

== International career ==
In October 2022, Bada was called up to the Ivory Coast U23 football team by manager Emerse Faé to face Niger in the second round of the 2023 U23 Africa Cup of Nations qualification. He remained on the bench as an unused substitute during both matches and did not make his official debut, as the Ivorian team was eliminated by Niger.

== Honours ==
ASEC Mimosas

- Ligue 1: 2021–22, 2022–23
- Coupe de Côte d'Ivoire: 2023
- Coupe de Côte d'Ivoire runner-up: 2024
- Supercoupe de Côte d'Ivoire: 2023

Singida Black Stars FC

- Tanzania FA Cup runner-up: 2024–25
