= Oualid Malki =

Algerian footballer (born 2004)

Oualid Malki ⵡⴰⵍⵉⴷ ⵎⴰⵍⴽⵉ
Personal information
- Date of birth: 12 February 2004 (age 22)
- Place of birth: Lakhdaria, Algeria
- Height: 1.82 m (6 ft 0 in)
- Position: Striker

Team information
- Current team: JS Kabylie
- Number: 27

Youth career
- –2021: IB Lakhdaria
- 2021–2025: JS Kabylie

Senior career*
| Years | Team | Apps | (Gls) |
| 2025– | JS Kabylie | 25 | (3) |
- * Club domestic league appearances and goals as of 19:10, 14 October 2026 (UTC)

Oualid Malki (Arabic: وليد مالكي; Tamazight: ⵡⴰⵍⵉⴷ ⵎⴰⵍⴽⵉ; born 12 February 2004) is an Algerian professional footballer who plays as a striker for JS Kabylie.

== Club career ==
Oualid Malki was born in Lakhdaria, Bouira Province, Kabylia, Algeria. Malki is from the Kabyle village of Tazrout, in Bouderbala, Lakhdaria District, Bouira Province.

In 2021, he joined the youth categories of JS Kabylie, under the presidency of Cherif Mellal.

On 10 May 2024, with the JS Kabylie U21 team, he won the Algerian League Cup U21 2023–24, against the ES Sétif U21 team.

On 4 January 2025, with the JS Kabylie U21 team, he won the Algerian Super Cup U21 2024, against the CR Belouizdad U21 team.

In January 2025, he was promoted to the senior team of JS Kabylie, signing until the end of the 2028–29 season.

On 21 January 2025, in Ligue 1, under the direction of coach Mohamed Lacet, he made his professional debut with JS Kabylie, simultaneously scoring his first professional goal.

== Honours ==
JS Kabylie U21

- Algerian League Cup U21: 2023–24
- Algerian Super Cup U21: 2024
