= Josef Zinnbauer =

German footballer and manager

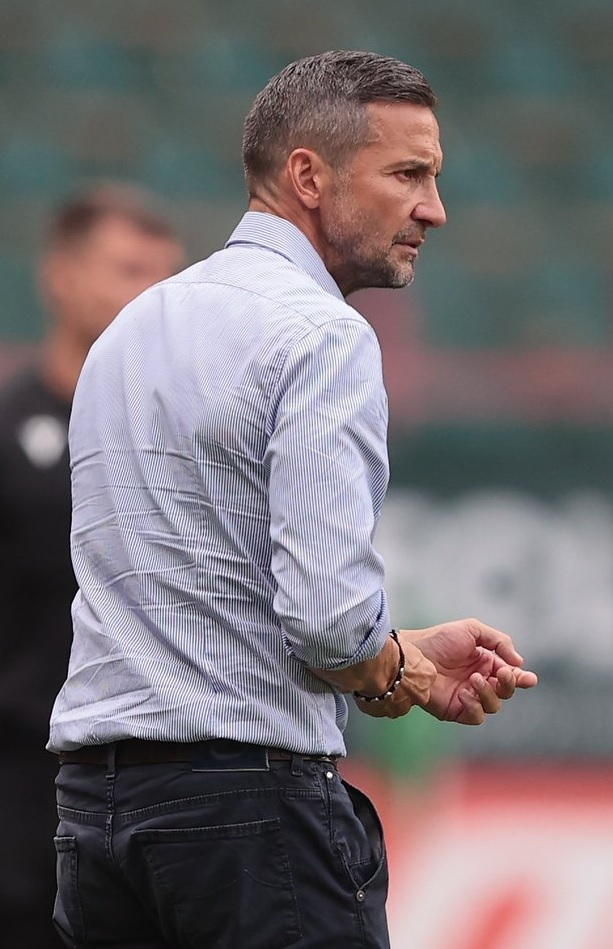
- Zinnbauer coaching Lokomotiv Moscow in 2022

Personal information
- Full name: Josef Zinnbauer
- Date of birth: 1 May 1970 (age 56)
- Place of birth: Schwandorf, West Germany
- Position: Midfielder

Senior career*
Years	Team	Apps	(Gls)
1988–1989	FV Wendelstein		
1989–1990	SVG Göttingen 07		
1990–1991	TSV Vestenbergsgreuth		
1991–1992	SC 08 Bamberg		
1992–1993	SpVgg Bayreuth		
1993–1994	SSV Ulm		
1994–1995	Karlsruher SC		
1995–1996	Mainz 05		
1996–1997	SG Post/Süd Regensburg		
1997–1998	SC Weismain		
1998–2004	TSV Wendelstein		
2004–2005	Henger SV		

Managerial career
- 1996–1997: SK Lauf
- 1998–2004: TSV Wendelstein
- 2004–2005: Henger SV
- 2005–2010: VfB Oldenburg
- 2012: Karlsruher SC II
- 2014: Hamburger SV II
- 2014–2015: Hamburger SV
- 2015: Hamburger SV II
- 2015–2017: St. Gallen
- 2019–2021: Orlando Pirates
- 2022–2023: Lokomotiv Moscow
- 2023–2024: Raja CA
- 2024: Al-Wehda
- 2025–2026: JS Kabylie
- * Club domestic league appearances and goals

Josef "Joe" Zinnbauer (born 1 May 1970) is a German professional football manager and former player who played as a midfielder.

== Playing career ==
Zinnbauer retired from playing after suffering a cartilage injury.

== Coaching career ==
Zinnbauer's coaching career started at VfB Oldenburg as head coach in 2005 and was there until 2010. Then he became an assistant coach at Karlsruher SC. He was head coach of Karlsruhe's reserve team from 27 March 2012 to 30 June 2012. He started coaching the reserve team for Hamburger SV on 1 July 2014. in the Regionalliga Nord. The reserve team won 4–0 against Goslarer SC 08 in his first match as a head coach. He led the reserve team to eight wins in eight matches prior to becoming head coach of the first team on 16 September 2014. He replaced Mirko Slomka, who was sacked the previous day. His first match in–charge finished in a 0–0 draw against Bayern Munich. He was sacked on 22 March 2015. Peter Knäbel, the Sports Director for Hamburg, took over for the remainder of the season.

Zinnbauer returned to the reserve team for the 2015–16 season and was there until he was hired by FC St. Gallen on 15 September 2015.

On 10 December 2019, he was appointed as a head coach of a South African professional football club Orlando Pirates FC, Joe Received Orlando Pirates at 11th Position in ABSA and finished the league in 3rd as an achievement. Exactly a year later in the Premier Soccer League coach Zinnbauer won his first title in South Africa. On 12 December 2020 Orlando Pirates became the champions of the MTN 8, after beating Bloemfontein Celtic in the final 2–1.

On 30 June 2022, Zinnbauer was hired by Lokomotiv Moscow in Russia. He was dismissed on 8 October 2022 following fifth consecutive league loss by Lokomotiv.

On 8 June 2023, Josef Zinnbauer was appointed as manager of Raja Club Athletic starting from the end of the 2022–23 season until June 2025. He became the first-ever German coach in the history of the club. He won the Moroccan League with Raja after four years without league titles, on top of that Raja became the first Moroccan club in history to do so undefeated. In addition, he achieved the domestic double, following a 2–1 victory over AS FAR in the Throne Cup final. On 23 July 2024, he announced his departure from the Moroccan club, in order to join Saudi side Al Wehda. He resigned on 15 November 2024 after disagreements with the club's technical directors.

On 20 January 2025, replacing Abdelhak Benchikha, Zinnbauer was appointed as head coach of JS Kabylie, until 30 June 2026. On 21 June 2025, by finishing second in the 2024–25 Algerian Ligue 1, he managed to qualify JSK for the 2025–26 CAF Champions League, after another unstable season for the Kabyle club. With yet another revamped JS Kabylie squad for the 2025–26 season, Zinnbauer managed to lead the Canaries to the 2025–26 CAF Champions League group stage. He was dismissed by JSK, on 18 March 2026.

== Coaching statistics ==
As of 18 March 2026

Team	From	To	Record					
Team	From	To	G	W	D	L	Win %	Ref.
Karlsruhe II	27 March 2012	30 June 2012	9	8	0	1	88.89	
Hamburg II	1 July 2014	16 September 2014	8	8	0	0	100.00	
Hamburg	16 September 2014	22 March 2015	24	6	6	12	25.00	
Hamburg II	13 June 2015	15 September 2015	8	2	2	4	25.00	
St. Gallen	15 September 2015	4 May 2017	63	19	14	30	30.16	
Orlando Pirates	10 December 2019	16 August 2021	68	35	20	13	51.47	
Lokomotiv Moscow	1 July 2022	8 October 2022	15	4	3	8	26.67	
Raja CA	8 June 2023	23 July 2024	45	32	11	2	71.11	
Al-Wehda	24 July 2024	21 November 2024	12	2	3	7	16.67	
JS Kabylie	20 January 2025	18 March 2026	47	21	14	12	44.68	
Total			299	137	73	89	45.82	—

== Honours ==
=== Manager ===
Orlando Pirates

- MTN 8: 2020

Raja CA

- Botola Pro: 2023–24
- Moroccan Throne Cup: 2023–24; runner-up: 2022–23

Individual

- Botola Pro Manager of the Season: 2023–24
