= Hocine Aït Ahmed Stadium =

Stadium in Algeria

Hocine Aït Ahmed Stadium ⴰⵏⵏⴰⵔ ⵃⵓⵙⵉⵏ ⴰⵝ ⵃⵎⴻⴸ
- Annar Ḥusin At Ḥmed
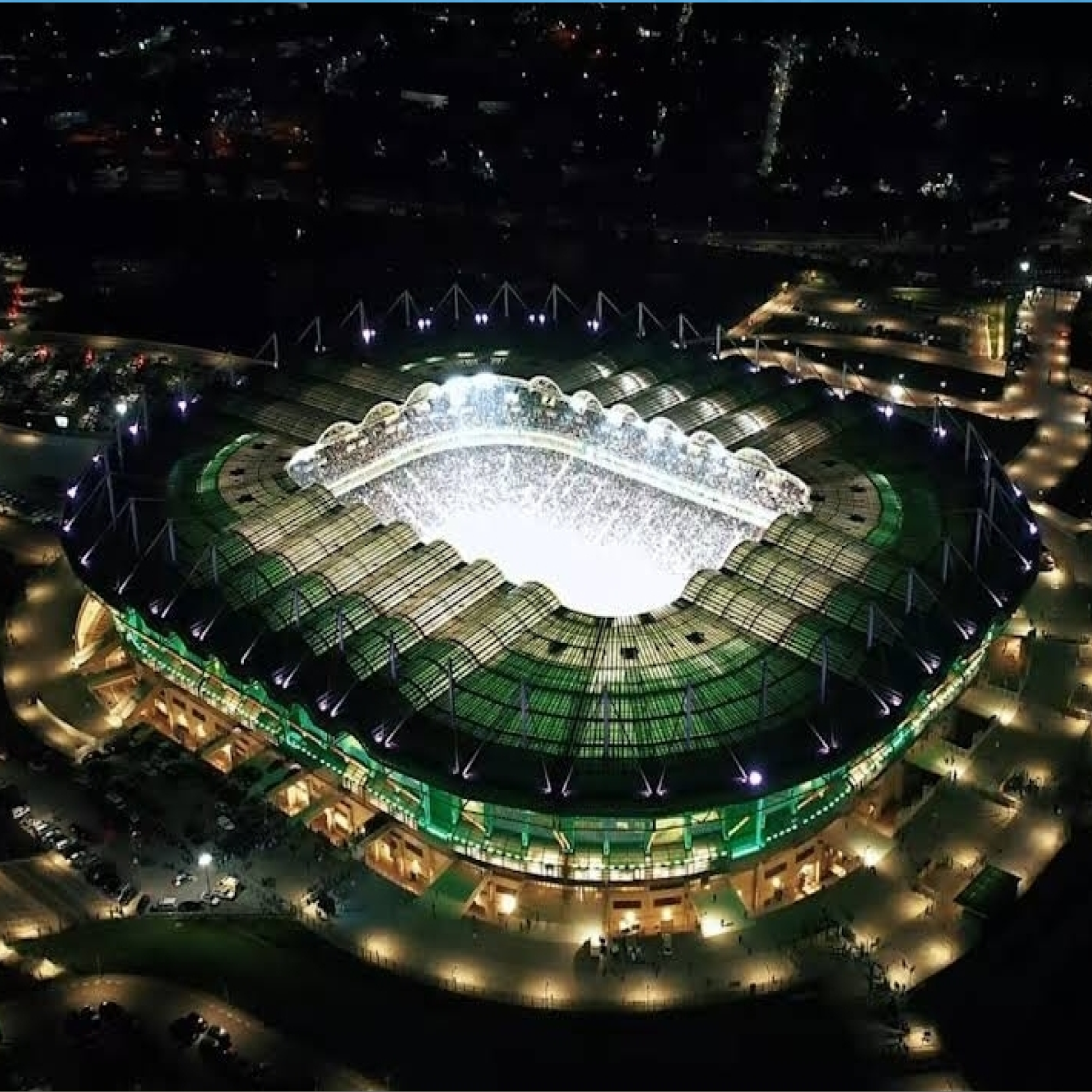
- Interactive map of Hocine Aït Ahmed Stadium ⴰⵏⵏⴰⵔ ⵃⵓⵙⵉⵏ ⴰⵝ ⵃⵎⴻⴸ
- Full name: Hocine Aït Ahmed Stadium
- Location: Boukhalfa, Tizi Ouzou, Algeria
- Coordinates: 36°43′44.4″N 4°0′47.3″E
- Owner: Ministry of Sport
- Operator: Ministry of Sport
- Capacity: 50,766
- Surface: AirFibr (hybrid grass)
- Scoreboard: Yes
- Field size: 105 by 68 metres (115 by 74 yd)

Construction
- Groundbreaking: 15 May 2010
- Built: 2010–2023
- Opened: 10 July 2024
- Cost: 348,000,000 Euro
- Architect: Omar Malki
- Builders: Atlas Group; Atlas Genie Civil Spa

Tenant
- JS Kabylie (2024–present)

Hocine Aït Ahmed Stadium (Tamazight: ⴰⵏⵏⴰⵔ ⵃⵓⵙⵉⵏ ⴰⵝ ⵃⵎⴻⴸ, Arabic: ملعب حسين آيت أحمد, Kabyle: Annar Ḥusin At Ḥmed) is a football stadium located in Boukhalfa, Tizi Ouzou, Kabylia region, Algeria. Hocine Aït Ahmed Stadium is owned by the Algerian Ministry of Sport. With 50,766 seats, it is the third largest stadium in Algeria. The stadium was designed by United States-based construction company Atlas Group subsidiary Atlas Genie Civil Spa. They completed the project in 2023, after 13 years of work as they started the construction on May 15, 2010. Replacing the 1 November 1954 Stadium, it is the new home ground of JS Kabylie, since 2024.

== History ==
After the club won their third consecutive CAF Cup, in 2002, JS Kabylie was pledged by Algerian president Abdelaziz Bouteflika a new stadium, to match the club's sporting ambitions.

The ETRHB Haddad group officially started the construction on May 15, 2010, but several delays, conceded for various hazards, pushed the delivery of the stadium to 2023.

In May 2019 came the end of the contractual period with the ETRHB Haddad group presented another project stoppage. It had reached an estimated completion rate of 85%.

On July 16, 2020, Minister of Youth and Sports Sid Ali Khaldi, who was making an inspection visit to the construction site, announced the termination of the contract of the ETRHB Haddad group. He had also announced on the occasion the establishment of new specifications to complete the project for the rest of the work by another group.

In May 2020, the site was then entrusted to the public company Cosider to resume completion of the 15% to 20% of the work that remained to be done. This company did not receive its service order (ODS) until September 2020. "The remaining works must be completed within a period not exceeding 12 months", i.e. before the end of 2021, according to the contract between this company and the local authorities.

On February 27, 2022, the Minister of Housing, Urban Planning and the City, Mohamed Tarek Belaribi, gave instructions to the project managers to speed up the administrative procedure to allow the resumption of construction.

In concrete terms, work did not resume until April 2022. The site was relaunched on Thursday, April 14, 2022, by the Minister for Housing, Urban Planning and the City, Tarek Belaribi, who carried out the occasion his second visit in the space of a few weeks to the site. On occasion, the company was called upon to step up the pace in order to deliver the project on time, estimated at 12 months.

On June 18, 2022, the president of the People's Assembly of the Wilaya of Tizi Ouzou, Mohamed Klalèche, announced that he had called a Turkish company for reinforcements to help Cosider complete the work on time.

On September 29, 2022, the Minister of Housing, Mohamed Tarek Belaribi, carried out an inspection visit to this infrastructure and assessed the progress of the work at 45%. The Minister also announced the end of the exterior works at the end of October 2022, those at the level of the stands on November 1, and the final delivery of the new Tizi Ouzou stadium in 2023.

On July 10, 2024, the stadium was inaugurated in the presence of the president Abdelmadjid Tebboune.

== Name of the stadium ==
Many names have been suggested and discussed among the population; among them the name of Abdelkader Khalef and Mohand Chérif Hannachi because of their legacy and everything they did for JS Kabylie, but only the name of the legendary leader of the FLN during the independence war Hocine Aït Ahmed was chosen to be the name of the new stadium of JS Kabylie.

== Test match and first goal ==
On June 18, 2023, the first test match opposed the JS Kabylie U21 team against the US Biskra U21 team, in the U21 championship. Lahlou Akhrib of JS Kabylie became the very first goalscorer of the Hocine Aït Ahmed Stadium, in a 3–1 victory for the JS Kabylie U21 team.

== Official match and first goal ==
On September 27, 2024, the first official match opposed JS Kabylie against Olympique Akbou in a Kabyle derby, in championship. Kouceila Boualia of JS Kabylie scored the first goal in an official match at this stadium during a 2–1 victory for JSK.

== See also ==
- List of football stadiums in Algeria
- List of African stadiums by capacity
- List of association football stadiums by capacity
