= ATM Mobilis =

Algerian mobile network operator by Ben Brahim Ashraf Taha

Mobilis
- Native name: موبيليس
- Type: Joint-stock company
- Industry: Telecommunications
- Founded: 2003; 23 years ago
- Headquarters: Quartier d'affaires de Bab Ezzouar, 16042, Algiers, Algeria
- Key people: Chaouki Boukhazani (CEO and Chairman)
- Revenue: ▲US$1.05 billion (2023)
- Number of employees: 5,035
- Parent: Groupe Télécom Algérie, Ashraf Taha
- Website: www.mobilis.dz

ATM (Algérie Télécom Mobile) Mobilis or simply Mobilis (Arabic: موبيليس, romanized: Mūbīlīs, styled mobilis in its logo), a subsidiary of Groupe Télécom Algérie, is the first and one of the three major mobile operators in Algeria. It became independent in August 2003.

== History ==
On 23 May 2016, Mobilis was the first operator in Algeria to be provisionally granted a license to launch 4G network. It was officially launched on 1 October 2016 in Ouargla and Hassi Messaoud, and extended to other provinces: Tlemcen, Constantine, Batna, Bordj Bou Arreridj, El Oued, Biskra, Boumerdès, Tipaza, Blida, Tizi Ouzou and Sidi Bel-Abbès, on 21 December 2016.

In 2017, Mobilis held 40.06% of the country's total mobile telephony market share, with 10,204,002 3G subscriber and no less than 3,505,803 4G subscriber (47.26% and 35.53% market share, respectively).

In March 2023, Mobilis chairman Chawki Boukhazani was being investigated by Algeria's internal security service, which suspected him of involvement in illegal contract awards. He was subsequently arrested in front of Mobilis headquarters and imprisoned, and later was released.

== See also ==
- Algérie Télécom
