= 2023–24 MC Oran season =

MC Oran
2023–24 season
- Owner: Hyproc Shipping Company (from 17 August 2023)
- President: Chakib Ghomari
- Head coach: Kheïreddine Madoui (from 26 August 2023) (until 11 January 2024); Youcef Bouzidi (from 11 January 2024)
- Stadium: Miloud Hadefi Stadium; Ahmed Zabana Stadium
- Ligue 1: 13th
- Algerian Cup: Round of 16
- Top goalscorer: League: Merouane Boussalem (4 goals); All: Merouane Boussalem (6 goals)
- Biggest win: MC Oran 4–1 ES Sétif
- Biggest defeat: MC Oran 1–4 CS Constantine
Home colours	Away colours	Third colours

The 2023–24 season, is MC Oran's 58th season and the club's 15th consecutive season in the top flight of Algerian football. In addition to the domestic league, MC Oran are participating in the Algerian Cup.

== Review ==
On 17 August 2023, Hyproc Shipping Company became the new owner of MC Oran buying (90.34%) of shares. The meeting was held at the headquarter of Oran Province and the documents were signed by the acting director of Hyproc Abdennacer Bahlouli and The President Of the CSA Chemsseddine Bensnouci.

== Squad list ==
Players and squad numbers last updated on 5 February 2024.
Note: Flags indicate national team as has been defined under FIFA eligibility rules. Players may hold more than one non-FIFA nationality.

No.	Nat.	Position	Name	Date of Birth (Age)	Signed from
Goalkeepers
16	(Algeria)	GK	Faris Boukerrit	9 March 1998 (aged 25)	(Algeria) CS Constantine
20	(Algeria)	GK	Bachir Della Krachai	18 August 1996 (aged 27)	(Algeria) ASM Oran
Defenders
3	(Algeria)	CB	Abdelkader Tamimi	20 March 2001 (aged 22)	(Algeria) Youth system
4	(Algeria)	CB	Mohamed Naâmani	September 21, 1990 (aged 32)	(Saudi Arabia) Al Fateh
5	(Algeria)	LB	Djamel Ibouzidène	22 January 1994 (aged 28)	(Algeria) NC Magra
12	(Algeria)	RB	Abdelkader Belharrane	August 11, 2000 (aged 23)	(Algeria) USM Alger
14	(Algeria)	LB	H'mida Salah	23 May 1992 (aged 31)	(Algeria) NC Magra
15	(Algeria)	CB	Abderrahmane Nehari	9 April 1994 (aged 29)	(Algeria) Olympique de Médéa
24	(Algeria)	RB	Ahmed Kerroum	27 June 2000 (aged 23)	(Algeria) ASO Chlef
Midfielders
2	(Algeria)	MF	Ilyes Chérif El-Ouazzani	6 July 2001 (aged 22)	(Algeria) Youth system
6	(Algeria)	MF	Juba Oukaci	8 July 1996 (aged 26)	(Algeria) JS Kabylie
8	(Algeria)	MF	Salim Bennai	25 March 1997 (aged 26)	(Algeria) NA Hussein Dey
13	(Algeria)	MF	Amine Benbelaid	25 March 1992 (aged 31)	(Algeria) ASM Oran
18	(Algeria)	MF	Mohamed Bengrina	24 March 1996 (aged 27)	(Algeria) ASO Chlef
22	(Algeria)	MF	Seddik Senhadji	3 November 2000 (aged 22)	(Algeria) CR Témouchent
23	(Algeria)	MF	Abdelhafid Benamara	October 1, 1995 (aged 27)	(Algeria) USM El Harrach
25	(Algeria)	MF	Imed Saihi	11 August 2000 (aged 23)	(Algeria) WA Mostaganem
27	(Algeria)	MF	Aymen Chadli	3 September 1999 (aged 24)	(Algeria) RC Relizane
Forwards
7	(Ghana)	FW	Maxwell Baakoh	8 October 1995 (aged 28)	(Algeria) USM Khenchela
9	(Algeria)	FW	Mourad Benayad	25 September 1990 (aged 32)	(Algeria) NA Hussein Dey
11	(Algeria)	FW	Merouane Boussalem	11 February 1996 (aged 27)	(Algeria) NA Hussein Dey
17	(Algeria)	FW	Zoubir Motrani	24 July 1995 (aged 28)	(Saudi Arabia) Al-Nairyah Club
19	(Algeria)	FW	Merouane Dahar	25 December 1992 (aged 30)	(Algeria) AS Ain M'lila
21	(Algeria)	FW	Oualid Ardji	7 September 1995 (aged 28)	(Algeria) CS Constantine
26	(Algeria)	FW	Yacine Guenina	February 15, 1995 (aged 28)	(Algeria) JS Kabylie

== Transfers ==
=== In ===
==== Summer ====
Date	Pos	Player	Moving from	Fee	Source
1 July 2023	MF	(Algeria) Ilyes Chérif El-Ouazzani	Youth system	Promotion	
24 August 2023	DF	(Algeria) Abdelkader Belharrane	USM Alger	Free transfer	
24 August 2023	MF	(Algeria) Amine Benbelaid	ASM Oran	Free transfer	
24 August 2023	FW	(Algeria) Yacine Guenina	JS Kabylie	Free transfer	
24 August 2023	FW	(Algeria) Zoubir Motrani	Free agent	Free transfer	
31 August 2023	MF	(Algeria) Juba Oukaci	JS Kabylie	Free transfer	
10 September 2023	GK	(Algeria) Faris Boukerrit	CS Constantine	Free transfer	

==== Winter ====
Date	Pos	Player	Moving from	Fee	Source
30 January 2024	FW	(Ghana) Maxwell Baakoh	USM Khenchela	40,000,000 DA	
30 January 2024	DF	(Algeria) H'mida Salah	NC Magra	Undisclosed	
31 January 2024	FW	(Algeria) Merouane Boussalem	US Biskra	Undisclosed	
31 January 2024	DF	(Algeria) Ahmed Kerroum	ASO Chlef	Undisclosed	
4 February 2024	FW	(Algeria) Oualid Ardji	CS Constantine	Free transfer	

=== Out ===
==== Summer ====
Date	Pos	Player	Moving to	Fee	Source
26 June 2023	GK	(Algeria) Kamel Soufi	USM Alger	Free transfer	
25 July 2023	DF	(Algeria) Benali Benamar	JS Saoura	Free transfer	
11 August 2023	DF	(Algeria) Zakaria Khali	CR Témouchent	Free transfer	
19 August 2023	DF	(Algeria) Mohamed Amine Ezzemani	(Morocco) MA Tétouan	Free transfer	
19 August 2023	DF	(Algeria) Imad Reguig	ES Sétif	Free transfer	
26 August 2023	FW	(Algeria) Ameur Bouguettaya	ES Mostaganem	Free transfer	
27 August 2023	MF	(Algeria) Mohamed Lagraa	JSM Tiaret	Free transfer	
30 August 2023	FW	(Algeria) Belkacem Yadaden	JSM Tiaret	Free transfer	
10 September 2023	MF	(Algeria) Yasser Belaribi	MC El Bayadh	Free transfer	
10 September 2023	DF	(Algeria) Sofiane Khadir	MO Constantine	Free transfer	

==== Winter ====
Date	Pos	Player	Moving to	Fee	Source
5 January 2024	FW	(Algeria) Hamza Belahouel	Free agent	Free transfer (Released)	
25 January 2024	DF	(Algeria) Amine Abed Abbassi	Free agent	Free transfer (Released)	
25 January 2024	FW	(Algeria) Mahi Benhamou	Free agent	Free transfer (Released)	
25 January 2024	DF	(Algeria) Hichem Talha	Free agent	Free transfer (Released)	
31 January 2024	DF	(Algeria) Senoussi Fourloul	Free agent	Free transfer (Released)	
31 January 2024	GK	(Algeria) Athmane Toual	Free agent	Free transfer (Released)	
4 February 2024	MF	(Algeria) Ramzi Tennah	Free agent	Free transfer (Released)	

== Competitions ==
=== Overview ===
Competition	Record								Started round	Final position / round	First match	Last match
Competition	G	W	D	L	GF	GA	GD	Win %	Started round	Final position / round	First match	Last match
Ligue 1	30	9	9	12	26	33	−7	30.00	—N/a	13th	15 September 2023	In Progress
Algerian Cup	3	2	0	1	5	2	+3	66.67	Round of 64	Round of 16	3 February 2024	30 March 2024
Total	33	11	9	13	31	35	−4	33.33				

Updated to match played 14 June 2024
Source: Competitions

=== Ligue 1 ===
==== League table ====
Pos	Team	Pld	W	D	L	GF	GA	GD	Pts	Qualification or relegation
11	MC El Bayadh	30	10	8	12	29	30	−1	38	
12	NC Magra	30	9	11	10	30	32	−2	38	
13	MC Oran	30	9	9	12	26	33	−7	36	
14	US Biskra	30	9	9	12	25	34	−9	36	
15	ES Ben Aknoun (R)	30	8	8	14	32	37	−5	32 (Note: ES Ben Aknoun awarded 3–0 win against US Souf.)	Relegation to Algerian Ligue 2

Source: the-sports.org
Rules for classification: 1) points; 2) head-to-head points; 3) head-to-head goal difference; 4) goal difference; 5) total goals; 6) fairplay ranking; 7) playoff.
(R) Relegated

==== Results summary ====
Overall								Home						Away					
Pld	W	D	L	GF	GA	GD	Pts	W	D	L	GF	GA	GD	W	D	L	GF	GA	GD
30	9	9	12	26	33	−7	36	8	3	3	18	14	+4	1	6	9	8	19	−11

Last updated: 14 June 2024.
Source: Competitive matches

==== Results by round ====
Round	1	2	3	4	5	6	7	8	9	10	11	12	13	14	15	16	17	18	19	20	21	22	23	24	25	26	27	28	29	30
Ground	A	H	A	H	A	H	A	H	A	H	A	A	H	A	H	H	A	H	A	H	A	H	A	H	A	H	H	A	H	A
Result	L	D	D	D	L	W	L	L	L	L	L	L	L	W	L	D	D	W	D	W	D	W	L	W	D	W	W	D	W	L
Position	14	13	14	14	15	14	14	14	14	14	14	15	15	15	15	15	14	14	15	15	15	15	15	15	15	15	14	13	12	13

Updated to match(es) played on 14 June 2024. Source: Competitive matches
A = Away; H = Home; W = Win; D = Draw; L = Loss

==== Matches ====
The league fixtures were announced on 24 August 2023.

All times are local, WAT (UTC+1).

Win Draw Loss Postponed

15 September 2023 Round 1	ASO Chlef	2–0	MC Oran	Chlef
19:00	Addadi 47'; Aliane 62'	Report		Stadium: Mohamed Boumezrag Stadium; Referee: Abdelali Ibrir

23 September 2023 Round 2	MC Oran	1–1	JS Saoura	Bir El Djir
19:00	Benamara 36'	Report	Bellatreche 5' (pen.)	Stadium: Miloud Hadefi Stadium; Attendance: 3.793; Referee: Youcef Gamouh

29 September 2023 Round 3	US Souf	0–0	MC Oran	El Oued
15:45		Report		Stadium: 1 November 1954 Stadium; Referee: Mohamed Belkebir

6 October 2023 Round 4	MC Oran	0–0	NC Magra	Bir El Djir
19:00		Report		Stadium: Miloud Hadefi Stadium; Referee: Anes Azrine

10 November 2023 Round 5	Paradou AC	1–0	MC Oran	Dar El Beïda
15:30	Kohili 15'	Report		Stadium: Omar Benrabah Stadium; Referee: Rafik Aouina

17 November 2023 Round 6	MC Oran	1–0	USM Khenchela	Bir El Djir
16:45	Bengrina 19'	Report		Stadium: Miloud Hadefi Stadium; Referee: Hamza Bouslimani

2 December 2023 Round 8	MC Oran	1–3	JS Kabylie	Oran
18:00	Naâmani 77'	Report	Boualia 60'; Berkane 62'; Mouaki 90+5' (pen.)	Stadium: Ahmed Zabana Stadium; Referee: Abderrahmane Sahraoui

16 December 2023 Round 10	MC Oran	0–1	US Biskra	Oran
19:00		Report	Boussalem 14'	Stadium: Ahmed Zabana Stadium; Referee: Billel Soltani

29 December 2023 Round 11	ES Sétif	1–0	MC Oran	Sétif
16:00	Lahmeri 63' (pen.)	Report		Stadium: 8 May 1945 Stadium; Referee: Mohamed Belkebir

5 January 2024 Round 12	ES Ben Aknoun	2–1	MC Oran	Belouizdad
15:15	Hachoud 11' (pen.); Hadji 60'	Report	Benayad 23'	Stadium: 20 August 1955 Stadium; Referee: Houssam Benyahia

11 January 2024 Round 13	MC Oran	1–4	CS Constantine	Oran
16:45	Djamel Ibouzidène 77'	Report	Dib 39' (pen.); Temine 66', 86', 88'	Stadium: Ahmed Zabana Stadium; Referee: Rafik Aouina

15 January 2024 Round 7	USM Alger	2–0	MC Oran	Algiers
18:00	Benzaza 62'; Dehiri 78'	Report		Stadium: Stade du 5 Juillet; Referee: Abdelmoumen Touabti

19 January 2024 Round 14	MC El Bayadh	0–1	MC Oran	El Bayadh
15:30		Report	Motrani 63'	Stadium: Zakaria Medjdoub Stadium; Referee: Mohamed Lamine Chaoubi

26 January 2024 Round 15	MC Oran	0–2	MC Alger	Oran
17:00		Report	Bayazid 63'; Belharrane 85' (o.g.)	Stadium: Ahmed Zabana Stadium; Referee: Abdelali Ibrir

30 January 2024 Round 9	CR Belouizdad	2–0	MC Oran	Algiers
18:00	Laouafi 45+9' (pen.); Meziane 75'	Report		Stadium: Stade du 5 Juillet; Referee: Billel Soltani

9 February 2024 Round 16	MC Oran	1–1	ASO Chlef	Oran
15:45	Ardji 45+1'	Report	Agbagno 21'	Stadium: Ahmed Zabana Stadium; Referee: Akram Mechairia

17 February 2024 Round 17	JS Saoura	1–1	MC Oran	Béchar
16:45	Akacem 83'	Report	Naâmani 90+4'	Stadium: 20 August 1955 Stadium; Referee: Youcef Gamouh

24 February 2024 Round 18	MC Oran	2–1	US Souf	Oran
16:45	Boussalem 51'; Naâmani 90+3'	Report	Hadj Saad 40'	Stadium: Ahmed Zabana Stadium; Referee: Redouane Allou

1 March 2024 Round 19	NC Magra	1–1	MC Oran	Magra
16:00	Merouani 32'	Report	Dahar 89'	Stadium: Boucheligue Brothers Stadium; Referee: Lahlou Benbraham

15 March 2024 Round 20	MC Oran	2–0	Paradou AC	Oran
22:00	Benayad 16', 75'	Report		Stadium: Ahmed Zabana Stadium; Referee: Saïd Aouina

23 March 2024 Round 21	USM Khenchela	0–0	MC Oran	Khenchela
15:30		Report		Stadium: Amar Hamam Stadium; Referee: Hamza Bouslimani

16 April 2024 Round 23	JS Kabylie	3–1	MC Oran	Tizi Ouzou
18:00	Nechat 6'; Boualia 18'; Berkane 59'	Report	Boussalem 82'	Stadium: 1 November 1954 Stadium; Referee: Houssam Benyahia

28 April 2024 Round 24	MC Oran	1–0	CR Belouizdad	Oran
19:00	Boussalem 84' (pen.)	Report		Stadium: Ahmed Zabana Stadium; Referee: Abdelmoumen Touabti

11 May 2024 Round 25	US Biskra	0–0	MC Oran	Biskra
17:00		Report		Stadium: 18 February Stadium; Referee: Lotfi Bekouassa

17 May 2024 Round 26	MC Oran	4–1	ES Sétif	Oran
17:00	Boussalem 5' (pen.); Motrani 49', 64'; Aggoun 58' (o.g.)	Report	Lahmeri 32' (pen.)	Stadium: Ahmed Zabana Stadium; Referee: Fodil Oukil

21 May 2024 Round 22	MC Oran	1–0	USM Alger	Oran
19:00	Dahar 39'	Report		Stadium: Ahmed Zabana Stadium; Referee: Said Aouina

26 May 2024 Round 27	MC Oran	1–0	ES Ben Aknoun	Oran
16:45	Kerroum 45+3'	Report		Stadium: Ahmed Zabana Stadium; Referee: Youcef Gamouh

7 June 2024 Round 28	CS Constantine	1–1	MC Oran	Khenchela
16:45	Bouguerra 20'	Report	Kerroum 20'	Stadium: Amar Hamam Stadium; Referee: Billel Soltani

11 June 2024 Round 29	MC Oran	2–0	MC El Bayadh	Oran
16:45	Baakoh 19'; Benamara 80'	Report		Stadium: Ahmed Zabana Stadium; Referee: Redouane Allou

14 June 2024 Round 30	MC Alger	3–2	MC Oran	Baraki
18:00	Belaïli 4', 52' (pen.); Merzougui 48'	Report	Bengrina 11'; Dahar 82'	Stadium: Nelson Mandela Stadium; Referee: Tahar Boudjemaa

=== Algerian Cup ===
3 February 2024 Round of 64	MC Oran	3–0	CR Béni Thour	Oran
13:45	Boussalem 25', 78'; Benayad 85'	Report		Stadium: Ahmed Zabana Stadium; Referee: Adel Facih
Note: MC Oran Lineups: Boukerrit, Salah (substituted off) 42' (Tamimi (substituted on) 42'), Belharrane, Kerroum, Nehari, Benamara, Senhadji (substituted off) 88' (Bennai (substituted on) 88'), Baakoh (substituted off) 88' (Bengrina (substituted on) 88'), Boussalem, Motrani (substituted off) 29' (Ibouzidène (substituted on) 29'), Benayad (substituted off) 88' (Chadli (substituted on) 88').

8 March 2024 Round of 32	Paradou AC	1–2	MC Oran	Dar El Beïda
15:00	Boulbina 76'	Report	Kerroum 88'; Motrani 90+1'	Stadium: Omar Benrabah Stadium; Referee: Billel Soltani
Note: MC Oran Lineups: Boukerrit, Tamimi, Belharrane (substituted off) 46' (Saihi (substituted on) 46'), Kerroum, Nehari, Benamara, Chadli, Bengrina (substituted off) 53' (Motrani (substituted on) 53'), Boussalem, Dahar, Benayad (substituted off) 77' (Senhadji (substituted on) 77').

30 March 2024 Round of 16	US Biskra	1–0	MC Oran	Biskra
22:00	Medane 65'	Report		Stadium: 18 February Stadium; Referee: Anes Azrine
Note: MC Oran Lineups: Boukerrit (substituted off) 56' (Hamadi (substituted on) 56'), Salah, Belharrane, Kerroum, Nehari, Benamara (substituted off) 77' (Benayad (substituted on) 77'), Chadli, Dahar (substituted off) 77' (Benattia (substituted on) 77'), Boussalem, Ardji (substituted off) 77' (Oukaci (substituted on) 77'), Motrani.

== Squad information ==
=== Playing statistics ===
No.	Pos	Nat	Player	Total		Ligue 1		Algerian Cup	
No.	Pos	Nat	Player	Apps	Goals	Apps	Goals	Apps	Goals
Goalkeepers
16	GK	(Algeria) ALG	Faris Boukerrit	14	0	11	0	3	0
20	GK	(Algeria) ALG	Bachir Della Krachai	5	0	5	0	0	0
40	GK	(Algeria) ALG	Anis Mendil	2	0	2	0	0	0
50	GK	(Algeria) ALG	Mohamed Hamadi	12	0	11	0	1	0
Defenders
3	DF	(Algeria) ALG	Abdelkader Tamimi	18	0	16	0	2	0
4	DF	(Algeria) ALG	Mohamed Naâmani	19	3	19	3	0	0
5	DF	(Algeria) ALG	Djamel Ibouzidène	23	1	22	1	1	0
12	DF	(Algeria) ALG	Abdelkader Belharrane	22	0	19	0	3	0
14	DF	(Algeria) ALG	H'mida Salah	8	0	6	0	2	0
15	DF	(Algeria) ALG	Abderrahmane Nehari	29	0	26	0	3	0
24	DF	(Algeria) ALG	Ahmed Kerroum	18	3	15	2	3	1
34	DF	(Algeria) ALG	Mohammed Abdelali	7	0	7	0	0	0
Midfielders
2	MF	(Algeria) ALG	Ilyes Chérif El-Ouazzani	1	0	1	0	0	0
6	MF	(Algeria) ALG	Juba Oukaci	7	0	6	0	1	0
8	MF	(Algeria) ALG	Salim Bennai	17	0	16	0	1	0
13	MF	(Algeria) ALG	Amine Benbelaid	5	0	5	0	0	0
18	MF	(Algeria) ALG	Mohamed Bengrina	19	2	17	2	2	0
19	FW	(Algeria) ALG	Merouane Dahar	20	3	18	3	2	0
22	MF	(Algeria) ALG	Seddik Senhadji	24	0	22	0	2	0
23	MF	(Algeria) ALG	Abdelhafid Benamara	32	2	29	2	3	0
25	MF	(Algeria) ALG	Imed Saihi	19	0	18	0	1	0
27	MF	(Algeria) ALG	Aymen Chadli	31	0	28	0	3	0
Forwards
7	FW	(Ghana) GHA	Maxwell Baakoh	10	1	9	1	1	0
9	FW	(Algeria) ALG	Mourad Benayad	32	4	29	3	3	1
11	FW	(Algeria) ALG	Merouane Boussalem	18	6	15	4	3	2
17	FW	(Algeria) ALG	Zoubir Motrani	15	4	12	3	3	1
21	FW	(Algeria) ALG	Oualid Ardji	14	1	13	1	1	0
26	FW	(Algeria) ALG	Yacine Guenina	3	0	3	0	0	0
31	FW	(Algeria) ALG	Abdellah Oukil	3	0	3	0	0	0
48	FW	(Algeria) ALG	Mohamed Amran	2	0	2	0	0	0
77	FW	(Algeria) ALG	Oussama Ben Attia	3	0	2	0	1	0
-	FW	(Algeria) ALG	Yacine Goudjil	2	0	2	0	0	0
-	FW	(Algeria) ALG	Mounir Mahadene	1	0	1	0	0	0
Players transferred out during the season
1	GK	(Algeria) ALG	Athmane Toual	2	0	2	0	0	0
7	DF	(Algeria) ALG	Hichem Talha	0	0	0	0	0	0
24	DF	(Algeria) ALG	Senoussi Fourloul	12	0	12	0	0	0
10	MF	(Algeria) ALG	Ramzi Tennah	4	0	4	0	0	0
14	MF	(Algeria) ALG	Amine Abed Abbassi	6	0	6	0	0	0
11	FW	(Algeria) ALG	Mahi Benhamou	11	0	11	0	0	0
21	FW	(Algeria) ALG	Hamza Belahouel	0	0	0	0	0	0

Last updated: 14 June 2024
Source: soccerway.com

=== Goalscorers ===
As of 14 June 2024

Includes all competitive matches. The list is sorted alphabetically by surname when total goals are equal.

No.	Nat.	Player	Pos.	L 1	AC	TOTAL
11	(Algeria)	Merouane Boussalem	FW	4	2	6
17	(Algeria)	Zoubir Motrani	FW	3	1	5
9	(Algeria)	Mourad Benayad	FW	3	1	4
24	(Algeria)	Ahmed Kerroum	DF	2	1	3
4	(Algeria)	Mohamed Naâmani	DF	3	0	3
19	(Algeria)	Merouane Dahar	FW	3	0	3
23	(Algeria)	Abdelhafid Benamara	MF	2	0	2
18	(Algeria)	Mohamed Bengrina	MF	2	0	2
5	(Algeria)	Djamel Ibouzidène	DF	1	0	1
21	(Algeria)	Oualid Ardji	FW	1	0	1
7	(Ghana)	Maxwell Baakoh	FW	1	0	1
Own Goals				1	0	1
Totals				26	5	31
