= 2017–18 MC Oran season =

MC Oran
2017–18 season
- Chairman: Ahmed "Baba" Belhadj
- Head coach: Moez Bouakaz (from 28 June 2017) (until 19 May 2018)
- Stadium: Stade Ahmed Zabana, Oran
- Ligue 1: 4th
- Algerian Cup: Round of 16
- Top goalscorer: League: Mohamed Tiaïba (7 goals); All: Mohamed Tiaïba (8 goals)
- Highest home attendance: 45,000 (vs. USM El Harrach, 23 February 2018)
Home colours	Away colours	Third colours

In the 2017–18 season, MC Oran competed in the Ligue 1 for the 52nd season, as well as the Algerian Cup.

== Non-competitive ==
=== Overview ===
Competition	Record								Started round	Final position / round	First match	Last match
Competition	G	W	D	L	GF	GA	GD	Win %	Started round	Final position / round	First match	Last match
Ligue 1	30	12	9	9	40	37	+3	40.00	—N/a	5th	26 August 2017	19 May 2018
Algerian Cup	3	2	0	1	2	1	+1	66.67	Round of 64	Round of 16	28 December 2017	3 February 2018
Total	33	14	9	10	42	38	+4	42.42				

Updated to match played 19 May 2018
Source: Competitions

== Ligue 1 ==
=== League table ===
Pos	Team	Pld	W	D	L	GF	GA	GD	Pts	Qualification or relegation
2	JS Saoura	30	16	6	8	38	27	+11	54	Qualification for the 2018–19 Champions League
3	NA Hussein Dey	30	11	16	3	36	24	+12	49	Qualification for the 2018–19 Confederation Cup
4	MC Oran	30	12	9	9	40	37	+3	45	
5	MC Alger	30	12	8	10	41	32	+9	44	Qualification for 2018–19 Arab Club Champions Cup
6	USM Alger	30	11	9	10	43	35	+8	42 (Note: Ranked on head-to-head results.)	Qualification for 2018–19 Arab Club Champions Cup

Updated to match(es) played on 19 May 2018. Source: DZFoot
Rules for classification: 1) points; 2) head-to-head points; 3) head-to-head goal difference; 4) goal difference; 5) total goals; 6) fairplay ranking; 7) playoff.

=== Results summary ===
Overall								Home						Away					
Pld	W	D	L	GF	GA	GD	Pts	W	D	L	GF	GA	GD	W	D	L	GF	GA	GD
30	12	9	9	40	34	+6	45	8	5	2	22	8	+14	4	4	7	18	26	−8

Last updated: 12 June 2018.
Source: Competitive matches

=== Results by round ===
Round	1	2	3	4	5	6	7	8	9	10	11	12	13	14	15	16	17	18	19	20	21	22	23	24	25	26	27	28	29	30
Ground	H	A	H	A	H	A	H	A	H	A	H	A	H	H	A	A	H	A	H	A	H	A	H	A	H	A	H	A	A	H
Result	W	L	D	W	D	W	D	D	L	D	W	L	D	W	D	W	W	D	W	W	W	L	W	L	L	L	D	L	L	W
Position	1	8	8	3	5	4	5	6	7	7	4	6	5	6	6	5	4	5	2	2	2	2	2	2	3	5	5	6	6	4

Source: Competitive matches
A = Away; H = Home; W = Win; D = Draw; L = Loss

=== Matches ===
Win Draw Loss

26 August 2017 Round 1	MC Oran	3–0	USM Blida	Oran
17:00	Mekkaoui 73'; Aouad 87'; Souibaâh 90' (pen.)	Soccerway report Live TV: Canal Algérie / Algérie 3		Stadium: Ahmed Zabana Stadium; Referee: Lotfi Bekouassa

7 September 2017 Round 2	Paradou AC	1–0	MC Oran	Bologhine
18:00	Bouabta 13'	Soccerway report Live TV: TV Tamazight 4		Stadium: Omar Hamadi Stadium; Referee: Said Aouina

16 September 2017 Round 3	MC Oran	0–0	NA Hussein Dey	Oran
17:00		Soccerway report Live TV: Canal Algérie		Stadium: Ahmed Zabana Stadium; Referee: Merzoug Brahimi

22 September 2017 Round 4	DRB Tadjenanet	0–1	MC Oran	Tadjenanet
16:00		Soccerway report Live TV: Canal Algérie	90+1' Frifer	Stadium: Lahoua Smaïl Stadium; Referee: Lyés Bekouassa

29 September 2017 Round 5	MC Oran	1–1	USM Bel-Abbès	Oran
17:00	Toumi 90+1'	Soccerway report Live TV: TV Tamazight 4	62' Tabti	Stadium: Ahmed Zabana Stadium; Referee: Lahlou Benbraham

14 October 2017 Round 6	USM El Harrach	2–3	MC Oran	Belouizdad
16:00	Mellel 52' (pen.); Banouh 57'	Soccerway report Live TV: Canal Algérie / Algérie 3	23' Bentiba; 89' Souibaâh; 90+3' Aouad	Stadium: Stade 20 Août 1955; Referee: Abderrezzak Arab

17 October 2017 Round 7	MC Oran	0–0	MC Alger	Oran
17:00		Soccerway report Live TV: EPTV Terrestre / TV Tamazight 4		Stadium: Ahmed Zabana Stadium; Referee: Boubekeur Zouaoui

21 October 2017 Round 8	US Biskra	2–2	MC Oran	Biskra
16:00	Berbache 15'; El Okbi 32' (pen.)	Soccerway report Live TV: None	19', 67' (pen.) Tiaïba	Stadium: El Alia Sports Complex; Referee: Lyés Bekouassa

27 October 2017 Round 9	MC Oran	1–2	ES Sétif	Oran
16:00	Toumi 62'	Soccerway report Live TV: Canal Algérie / Algérie 3	1', 84' Haddouche	Stadium: Ahmed Zabana Stadium; Referee: Merzoug Brahimi

7 November 2017 Round 10	CR Belouizdad	0–0	MC Oran	Belouizdad
16:00		Soccerway report Live TV: None		Stadium: Stade 20 Août 1955; Attendance: 0 (close doors); Referee: Mehdi Abid Charef

11 November 2017 Round 11	MC Oran	2–0	Olympique de Médéa	Oran
17:00	Boubekeur 56' (o.g.); Toumi 67'	Soccerway report Live TV: TV Tamazight 4		Stadium: Ahmed Zabana Stadium; Referee: Amine Hansal

17 November 2017 Round 12	CS Constantine	1–0	MC Oran	Constantine
17:00	Abid 58'	Soccerway report Live TV: Canal Algérie		Stadium: Stade Mohamed Hamlaoui; Referee: Lyés Bekouassa

2 December 2017 Round 13	MC Oran	1–1	USM Alger	Oran
16:00	Toumi 80'	Soccerway report Live TV: None	75' Darfalou	Stadium: Ahmed Zabana Stadium; Referee: Abderrezzak Arab

8 December 2017 Round 14	MC Oran	1–0	JS Saoura	Oran
16:00	Saïd 25'	Soccerway report Live TV: EPTV Terrestre / Algérie 3		Stadium: Ahmed Zabana Stadium; Referee: Lyés Bekouassa

15 December 2017 Round 15	JS Kabylie	3–3	MC Oran	Tizi Ouzou
16:00	Djabout 65', 70', 87'	Soccerway report Live TV: Algérie 3 / Canal Algérie	9' Gharbi; 18' Tiaïba; 60' Frifer	Stadium: November 1, 1954 Stadium; Referee: Merzak Halalchi

6 January 2018 Round 16	USM Blida	0–1	MC Oran	Blida
15:00		Soccerway report Live TV: None	90+3' Gharbi	Stadium: Brakni Brothers Stadium; Referee: Lahlou Benbraham

20 January 2018 Round 17	MC Oran	1–0	Paradou AC	Oran
16:00	Toumi 80'	Soccerway report Live TV: Algérie 3		Stadium: Ahmed Zabana Stadium; Referee: Merzoug Brahimi

26 January 2018 Round 18	NA Hussein Dey	1–1	MC Oran	Belouizdad
16:00	Alati 90+3' (pen.)	Soccerway report Live TV: Algérie 3	19' Toumi	Stadium: Stade 20 Août 1955; Referee: Boubekeur Zouaoui

10 February 2018 Round 19	MC Oran	3–2	DRB Tadjenanet	Oran
16:00	Chibane 38', 61'; Gharbi 83'	Soccerway report Live TV: Algérie 3 / Canal Algérie	42' (pen.) Maroci; 80' Belmokhtar	Stadium: Ahmed Zabana Stadium; Referee: Amine Hansal

17 February 2018 Round 20	USM Bel-Abbès	2–5	MC Oran	Sidi Bel Abbès
16:00	Zouari 24' (pen.); Bouguettaya 85'	Soccerway report Live TV: Canal Algérie	6' Bentiba; 22', 38' Mansouri; 69' Belal; 86' Frifer	Stadium: Stade 24 Fevrier 1956; Referee: Lyés Bekouassa

23 February 2018 Round 21	MC Oran	1–0	USM El Harrach	Oran
16:00	Chibane 70'	Soccerway report Live TV: EPTV Terrestre / Canal Algérie		Stadium: Ahmed Zabana Stadium; Referee: Ahmed Bouzrar

12 March 2018 Round 22	MC Alger	4–0	MC Oran	Algiers
18:00	Nekkache 4'; Bendebka 19'; Souibaâh 46'; Balegh 90'	Soccerway report Live TV: Al-Kass Sports / EPTV Terrestre		Stadium: July 5, 1962 Stadium; Referee: Said Aouina

17 March 2018 Round 23	MC Oran	5–0	US Biskra	Oran
16:00	Tiaïba 11', 65'; Chibane 38' (pen.), 45+3'; Gharbi 72'	Soccerway report Live TV: EPTV Terrestre / TV Tamazight 4		Stadium: Ahmed Zabana Stadium; Referee: Abderrezzak Arab

31 March 2018 Round 24	ES Sétif	4–1	MC Oran	Sétif
17:00	Rebiai 5'; Haddouche 24' (pen.); Aït Ouamar 35'; Banouh 84'	Soccerway report Live TV: Algérie 3 / Canal Algérie	40' Tiaïba	Stadium: Stade 8 Mai 1945; Referee: Lotfi Bekouassa

13 April 2018 Round 25	MC Oran	0–3	CR Belouizdad	Oran
16:00		Soccerway report Live TV: Canal Algérie / Algérie 3	35', 78' Draoui	Stadium: Ahmed Zabana Stadium; Referee: Boubekeur Zouaoui
Note: The game was suspended in the 81st minute, it was decided to give lost match to MC Oran (who had lost 0-2 anyway), with a score of 0-3 for CR Belouizdad, more than 200.000 DA of fine as well as the privation of the share due due to the rights of television for the match in question.

20 April 2018 Round 26	Olympique de Médéa	2–0	MC Oran	Médéa
16:00	Bouchiba 77' (pen.); Hamidi 90+2'	Soccerway report Live TV: None		Stadium: Stade Imam Lyes de Médéa; Referee: Lotfi Bekouassa

24 April 2018 Round 27	MC Oran	1–1	CS Constantine	Aïn Témouchent (Note: MC Oran play away from home and behind closed doors because of the violence in a meeting in the Ligue Professionnelle 1 against CR Belouizdad.)
16:00	Tiaïba 87'	Soccerway report Live TV: None	17' (pen.) Abid	Stadium: Omar Oucief Stadium; Attendance: 0 (close doors); Referee: Farouk Mial

28 April 2018 Round 28	USM Alger	3–1	MC Oran	Bologhine
16:00	Darfalou 65' (pen.), 69' (pen.); Benyahia 83'	Soccerway report Live TV: Canal Algérie	6' Chibane	Stadium: Omar Hamadi Stadium; Referee: Lahlou Benbraham

12 May 2018 Round 29	JS Saoura	1–0	MC Oran	Béchar
16:00	Bourdim 90' (pen.)	Soccerway report Live TV: None		Stadium: Stade 20 Août 1955; Referee: Amine Sekhraoui

19 May 2018 Round 30	MC Oran	2–1	JS Kabylie	Aïn Témouchent
16:00	Mekkaoui 21'; Benamara 61'	Soccerway report Live TV: None	72' Mesbahi	Stadium: Omar Oucief Stadium; Attendance: 0 (close doors); Referee: Ibrir

== Algerian Cup ==
28 December 2017 Round of 64	MC Oran	1–0	MCB Oued Sly	Oran
17:00	Tiaïba 63'	Report; Live TV: Canal Algérie / EPTV Terrestre		Stadium: Ahmed Zabana Stadium; Referee: Malik Aït Ameur

13 January 2018 Round of 32	NRB Teleghma	0–1	MC Oran	Mila
14:00		Report; Live TV: None	73' Toumi	Stadium: Belkacem Belaïd Stadium; Referee: Ibrir, Chelali, Benaceur

3 February 2018 Round of 16	MO Béjaïa	1–0	MC Oran	Béjaïa
16:00	Salhi 81'	[ Report] Live TV: TV Tamazight 4		Stadium: Maghrebi Unity Stadium; Referee: Lotfi Bekouassa

== Squad information ==
=== Playing statistics ===
No.	Pos	Nat	Player	Total		Ligue 1		Algerian Cup	
No.	Pos	Nat	Player	Apps	Goals	Apps	Goals	Apps	Goals
Goalkeepers
1	GK	(Algeria) ALG	Abderaouf Natèche	30	0	30	0	0	0
Defenders
15	DF	(Algeria) ALG	Zine El-Abidine Sebbah	22	0	22	0	0	0
17	DF	(Algeria) ALG	Zineddine Mekkaoui	28	2	28	2	0	0
19	DF	(Algeria) ALG	Adel Lakhdari	3	0	3	0	0	0
4	DF	(Algeria) ALG	Mourad Bendjelloul	9	0	9	0	0	0
5	DF	(Algeria) ALG	Slimane Allali	11	0	11	0	0	0
27	DF	(Algeria) ALG	Réda Halaïmia	28	0	28	0	0	0
	DF	(Algeria) ALG	Fayçal Abdat	12	0	12	0	0	0
	DF	(Algeria) ALG	Abderrahmane Blaha	5	0	5	0	0	0
Midfielders
28	MF	(Algeria) ALG	Sabri Gharbi	23	4	23	4	0	0
	MF	(Algeria) ALG	Zakaria Mansouri	12	2	12	2	0	0
24	MF	(Algeria) ALG	Hamza Heriat	25	0	25	0	0	0
25	MF	(Algeria) ALG	Rachid Ferrahi	18	0	18	0	0	0
21	MF	(Algeria) ALG	Omar Boudoumi	8	0	8	0	0	0
10	MF	(Algeria) ALG	Mohamed El Amine Aouad	23	2	23	2	0	0
14	MF	(Algeria) ALG	Abdelhafid Benamara	11	1	11	1	0	0
23	MF	(Algeria) ALG	Djamel Mimoun	2	0	2	0	0	0
	MF	(Algeria) ALG	Youcef Guertil	1	0	1	0	0	0
Forwards
8	FW	(Algeria) ALG	Mohamed Bentiba	20	1	20	1	0	0
11	FW	(Algeria) ALG	Mohamed Tiaïba	20	8	20	8	0	0
20	FW	(Algeria) ALG	Mohamed Toumi	21	6	21	6	0	0
29	FW	(Algeria) ALG	Mustapha Saïd	12	1	12	1	0	0
13	FW	(Algeria) ALG	Walid Hamidi	3	0	3	0	0	0
52	FW	(Algeria) ALG	Boumediene Freifer	18	3	18	3	0	0
	FW	(Algeria) ALG	Youcef Chibane	11	6	11	6	0	0
12	FW	(Algeria) ALG	Abderezzak Belal	17	1	17	1	0	0
Players transferred out during the season
9	FW	(Algeria) ALG	Mohamed Souibaâh	12	2	12	2	0	0

Last updated: 12 June 2018
Source: fr.soccerway.com

== Squad list ==
As of August 25, 2017. Note: Flags indicate national team as defined under FIFA eligibility rules; some limited exceptions apply. Players may hold more than one non-FIFA nationality.

No.	Pos.	Nation	Player
1	GK	ALG	Abderaouf Natèche (captain)
4	DF	ALG	Mourad Bendjelloul
5	DF	ALG	Slimane Allali
6	DF	ALG	Takfarinas Ouchène
7	FW	ALG	Amine Lamali
8	FW	ALG	Mohamed Bentiba
9	FW	ALG	Mohamed Souibaâh
10	MF	ALG	Mohamed El Amine Aouad
11	FW	ALG	Mohamed Tiaïba
12	FW	ALG	Abderezzak Belal
13	FW	ALG	Walid Hamidi
14	MF	ALG	Abdelhafid Benamara
15	DF	ALG	Zine El-Abidine Sebbah
16	GK	ALG	Bachir Della Krachai
17	DF	ALG	Zineddine Mekkaoui

No.	Pos.	Nation	Player
18	FW	ALG	Noureddine Hassani
19	DF	ALG	Adel Lakhdari
20	MF	ALG	Mohamed Toumi
21	MF	ALG	Omar Boudoumi
22	MF	ALG	Noureddine Gaïd
23	MF	ALG	Djamel Mimoun
24	MF	ALG	Hamza Heriat
25	MF	ALG	Rachid Ferrahi
27	DF	ALG	Réda Halaïmia
28	MF	ALG	Sabri Gharbi
29	MF	ALG	Mustapha Saïd
46	DF	ALG	Farouk Kouachi
49	DF	ALG	Abderrahmane Blaha
52	FW	ALG	Boumediene Freifer
58	MF	ALG	Youcef Guertil

== Transfers ==
=== In ===
Date	Pos	Player	From club	Transfer fee	Source
30 June 2017	DF	(Algeria) Zineddine Mekkaoui	RC Relizane	Free transfer (Released)	
30 June 2017	FW	(Algeria) Mohamed Tiaïba	(Qatar) Al-Markhiya	Free transfer (Released)	
4 July 2017	MF	(Algeria) Amine El Amalli	USM Bel-Abbès	Free transfer	
9 July 2017	DF	(Algeria) Adel Lakhdari	MO Béjaïa	Free transfer	
21 July 2017	FW	(Algeria) Saber Gharbi	Olympique de Médéa	Free transfer	
7 January 2018	FW	(Algeria) Youcef Chibane	ES Sétif	Loan	
9 January 2018	FW	(Algeria) Zakaria Mansouri	Paradou AC	Undisclosed	

=== Out ===
First Team
Date	Pos	Player	From club	Transfer fee	Source
1 July 2017	MF	(Algeria) Abdallah Bencheikh	US Biskra	Free transfer	
20 July 2017	FW	(Algeria) Hicham Chérif	NA Hussein Dey	Free transfer	
30 July 2017	MF	(Algeria) Mourad Delhoum	USM El Harrach	Free transfer	
21 December 2017	FW	(Algeria) Mohamed Souibaâh	MC Alger	Free transfer (Released)	
