= 2019–20 MC Oran season =

MC Oran
2019–20 season
- Chairman: Vacant
- Head coach: Tahar Chérif El-Ouazzani (from 16 June 2019) (until 1 October 2019); Bachir Mecheri (from 2 October 2019)
- Stadium: Stade Ahmed Zabana
- Ligue 1: 9th
- Algerian Cup: Round of 16
- Top goalscorer: League: Zakaria Mansouri (5 goals); All: Zakaria Mansouri (5 goals)

In the 2019–20 season, MC Oran competed in the Ligue 1 for the 54th season, as well as the Algerian Cup. On March 15, 2020, the Ligue de Football Professionnel (LFP) decided to halt the season due to the COVID-19 pandemic in Algeria. On July 29, 2020, the LFP declared that season is over and CR Belouizdad to be the champion, the promotion of four teams from the League 2, and scraping the relegation for the current season.

== Competitions ==
=== Overview ===
Competition	Record								Started round	Final position / round	First match	Last match
Competition	G	W	D	L	GF	GA	GD	Win %	Started round	Final position / round	First match	Last match
Ligue 1	22	7	9	6	28	24	+4	31.82	—N/a	9th	17 August 2019	14 March 2020
Algerian Cup	3	2	0	1	9	4	+5	66.67	Round of 64	Round of 16	26 December 2019	13 February 2020
Total	25	9	9	7	37	28	+9	36.00				

Updated to match played 3 June 2019
Source: Competitions

== League table ==
Pos	Team	Pld	W	D	L	GF	GA	GD	Pts	PPG
7	JS Saoura	22	9	6	7	19	18	+1	33	1.50
8	AS Aïn M'lila	22	8	8	6	26	25	+1	32	1.45
9	MC Oran	22	7	9	6	28	24	+4	30	1.36
10	Paradou AC	20	7	5	8	20	18	+2	26	1.30
11	USM Bel Abbès	21	8	2	11	22	31	−9	26	1.24

Updated to match(es) played on 15 March 2020. Source: dzfoot.com
Rules for classification: 1) points; 2) head-to-head points; 3) head-to-head goal difference; 4) goal difference; 5) total goals; 6) fairplay ranking; 7) playoff.

=== Results summary ===
Overall								Home						Away					
Pld	W	D	L	GF	GA	GD	Pts	W	D	L	GF	GA	GD	W	D	L	GF	GA	GD
22	7	9	6	28	24	+4	30	5	3	3	17	10	+7	2	6	3	11	14	−3

Last updated: 22 April 2018.
Source: Competitive matches

=== Results by round ===
Round	1	2	3	4	5	6	7	8	9	10	11	12	13	14	15	16	17	18	19	20	21	22	23	24	25	26	27	28	29	30
Ground																							A	H	A	H	A	H	A	H
Result																							C	C	C	C	C	C	C	C
Position																							9	9	9	9	9	9	9	9

Updated to match(es) played on 22 April 2019. Source: Competitive matches
A = Away; H = Home; W = Win; D = Draw; L = Loss

=== Matches ===
Win Draw Loss

17 August 2019 Round 1	MC Oran	3–1	USM Bel Abbès	Oran
20:45	Mansouri 18' (pen.); Mesmoudi 58'; Guertil 70'	Soccerway report	Belhocini 50' (pen.)	Stadium: Ahmed Zabana Stadium; Referee: Said Aouina

24 August 2019 Round 2	ES Sétif	1–1	MC Oran	Sétif
21:00	Radouani 70' (pen.)	Soccerway report	Motrani 48'	Stadium: Stade 8 Mai 1945; Referee: Lotfi Bekouassa

31 August 2019 Round 3	MC Oran	1–0	CS Constantine	Oran
20:30	Mansouri 51' (pen.)	Soccerway report		Stadium: Ahmed Zabana Stadium; Referee: Ahmed Bouzrar

11 September 2019 Round 4	AS Ain M'lila	2–1	MC Oran	Aïn M'lila
16:00	Tiaiba 53'; Demane 64'	Soccerway report	Mesmoudi 76'	Stadium: Touhami Zoubir Khelifi Stadium; Referee: Hamza Bouslimani

15 September 2019 Round 5	MC Oran	2–3	MC Alger	Oran
21:00	Mesmoudi 55'; Mansouri 90+5' (pen.)	Soccerway report	Bendebka 33'; Brahimi 40'; Bourdim 90+1'	Stadium: Ahmed Zabana Stadium; Referee: Farouk Mial

5 October 2019 Round 7	MC Oran	4–0	USM Alger	Oran
17:45	Fourloul 17'; Meftah 43' (o.g.); Mellal 74'; Benhamou 90+5'	Soccerway report		Stadium: Ahmed Zabana Stadium; Referee: Mehdi Abid Charef

23 October 2019 Round 8	MC Oran	0–1	Paradou AC	Oran
18:00		Soccerway report	Ghorab 80'	Stadium: Ahmed Zabana Stadium; Referee: Redouane Necib

30 October 2019 Round 9	CA Bordj Bou Arreridj	1–2	MC Oran	Bordj Bou Arréridj
18:45	Droueche 41' (pen.)	Soccerway report	Mellal 82'; Nadji 90+1'	Stadium: August 20, 1955 Stadium; Referee: Hamza Bouslimani

9 November 2019 Round 10	MC Oran	1–0	NC Magra	Oran
17:00	Freifer 37'	Soccerway report		Stadium: Ahmed Zabana Stadium; Referee: Lyés Bekouassa

16 November 2019 Round 6	JS Saoura	1–1	MC Oran	Béchar
18:00	Hammia 42'	Soccerway report	Fourloul 29'	Stadium: Stade 20 Août 1955; Referee: Youcef Gamouh

24 November 2019 Round 11	NA Hussein Dey	0–0	MC Oran	Belouizdad
15:00		Soccerway report		Stadium: Stade 20 Août 1955; Referee: Houssam Benyahia

30 November 2019 Round 12	MC Oran	0–0	US Biskra	Oran
15:00		Soccerway report		Stadium: Ahmed Zabana Stadium; Attendance: 0 (close doors); Referee: Lotfi Bekouassa

16 December 2019 Round 14	MC Oran	1–2	ASO Chlef	Oran
17:00	Mellal 41'	Soccerway report	Djahel 45'; Hellal 48'	Stadium: Ahmed Zabana Stadium; Referee: Hamza Bouslimani

21 December 2019 Round 15	CR Belouizdad	1–1	MC Oran	Belouizdad
15:00	Djerrar 2'	Soccerway report	Mansouri 85' (pen.)	Stadium: Stade 20 Août 1955; Referee: Mehdi Abid Charef

20 January 2020 Round 13	JS Kabylie	1–0	MC Oran	Tizi Ouzou
16:00	Saâdou 33'	Soccerway report		Stadium: Stade 1er Novembre 1954; Attendance: 0 (close doors); Referee: Said Aouina

1 February 2020 Round 16	USM Bel Abbès	1–2	MC Oran	Sidi Bel Abbès
18:45	Litt 45'	Soccerway report	Nadji 4', 63'	Stadium: Stade 24 Fevrier 1956; Referee: Ahmed Bouzrar

8 February 2020 Round 17	MC Oran	1–1	ES Sétif	Oran
17:45	Boutiche 64'	Soccerway report	Djahnit 50' (pen.)	Stadium: Ahmed Zabana Stadium; Referee: Hamza Bouslimani

17 February 2020 Round 18	CS Constantine	1–1	MC Oran	Constantine
17:00	Amokrane 55'	Soccerway report	Benhamou 4'	Stadium: Stade Mohamed Hamlaoui; Referee: Malek Ait Ameur

22 February 2020 Round 19	MC Oran	3–1	AS Aïn M'lila	Oran
17:00	Benhamou 50'; Abdelhafid 53'; Motrani 71'	Soccerway report	Tiaiba 29'	Stadium: Ahmed Zabana Stadium; Referee: Abdelmoumen Touabti

29 February 2020 Round 20	MC Alger	1–1	MC Oran	Algiers
17:45	Frioui 15'	Soccerway report	Motrani 73'	Stadium: Stade du 5 Juillet; Referee: Abdelali Ibrir

7 March 2020 Round 21	MC Oran	1–1	JS Saoura	Oran
16:00	Mansouri 78'	Soccerway report	Saâd 45+3'	Stadium: Ahmed Zabana Stadium; Referee: Lyés Bekouassa

14 March 2020 Round 22	USM Alger	4–1	MC Oran	Bologhine
16:00	Zouari 22', 48'; Benhammouda 53', 61'	Soccerway report	Benhamou 45+1'	Stadium: Omar Hamadi Stadium; Attendance: 0 (close doors); Referee: Abderrezzak Arab
Note: due to coronavirus outbreak, Ministry of Health, Population and Hospital Reform decided to be all matches played behind closed doors.

Round 23	Paradou AC	Cancelled	MC Oran	Bologhine
				Stadium: Omar Hamadi Stadium

Round 24	MC Oran	Cancelled	CA Bordj Bou Arreridj	Oran
				Stadium: Ahmed Zabana Stadium

Round 25	NC Magra	Cancelled	MC Oran	Magra
				Stadium: Boucheligue Brothers Stadium

Round 26	MC Oran	Cancelled	NA Hussein Dey	Oran
				Stadium: Ahmed Zabana Stadium

Round 27	US Biskra	Cancelled	MC Oran	Biskra
				Stadium: Stade du 18 Février

Round 28	MC Oran	Cancelled	JS Kabylie	Oran
				Stadium: Ahmed Zabana Stadium

Round 29	ASO Chlef	Cancelled	MC Oran	Chlef
				Stadium: Stade Mohamed Boumezrag

Round 30	MC Oran	Cancelled	CR Belouizdad	Oran
				Stadium: Ahmed Zabana Stadium

== Algerian Cup ==
26 December 2019 Round of 64	MC Oran	6–1	MJ Arzew	Oran
16:00	Freifer 34'; Mellal 47'; Nadji 51'; Guertil 55', 72'; Ezzemani 77'	Report	Boumaza 16'	Stadium: Ahmed Zabana Stadium; Referee: Zouaoui, Zemit, Benaoui
Note: Lineup for MC Oran - Litim, Hamidi, Ezzemani, Hammadi, Feghloul, Chaouti (Bendjelloul 70’), Benamara, Freifer, Nadji (Lamara 71’), Guertil, Mellal (Mansouri 65’)

2 January 2020 Round of 32	MC Oran	3–1	ARB Gheris	Oran
17:00	Nadji 23'; Hamidi 32'; Freifer 41'	Report	Attou 50' (pen.)	Stadium: Ahmed Zabana Stadium; Referee: Amar Khoudja, Slaouadji, Henni
Note: Lineup for MC Oran - Litim, Hamidi, Ezzemani, Feghloul, Hammadi, Benamara, Lagraâ, Chaouti (Mellal 77’), Freifer, Nadji (Motrani 87’), Guertil (Mansouri 67’)

13 February 2020 Round of 16	WA Boufarik	2–0	MC Oran	Boufarik
14:00	Adel Khettab 45', 54'	Report		Stadium: Stade Mohamed Reggaz; Referee: Youcef Gamouh
Note: Lineup for MC Oran - Mazouzi, Hamidi, Ezzemani (Mansouri 55’), Mekkaoui, Feghloul, Lagraâ, Boutiche, Mellal, Itime, Guertil (Chaouti 72’), Nadji (Freifer 8’)

== Squad information ==
=== Playing statistics ===
No.	Pos	Nat	Player	Total		Ligue 1		Algerian Cup	
No.	Pos	Nat	Player	Apps	Goals	Apps	Goals	Apps	Goals
Goalkeepers
1	GK	(Algeria) ALG	Sid Ahmed Rafik Mazouzi	8	0	7	0	1	0
30	GK	(Algeria) ALG	Oussama Litim	18	0	16	0	2	0
Defenders
3	DF	(Algeria) ALG	Boualem Mesmoudi	17	3	17	3	0	0
4	DF	(Algeria) ALG	Mourad Bendjelloul	4	0	3	0	1	0
12	DF	(Ivory Coast) CIV	Vivien Assie	0	0	0	0	0	0
13	DF	(Algeria) ALG	Mohamed Amine Ezzemani	13	1	10	0	3	1
14	DF	(Algeria) ALG	Nadjib Hammadi	2	0	0	0	2	0
15	DF	(Algeria) ALG	Zine El-Abidine Sebbah	16	0	16	0	0	0
17	DF	(Algeria) ALG	Zineddine Mekkaoui	13	0	12	0	1	0
27	DF	(Algeria) ALG	Kamel Hamidi	13	1	10	0	3	1
29	DF	(Algeria) ALG	Senoussi Fourloul	22	2	19	2	3	0
Midfielders
6	MF	(Algeria) ALG	Mohamed Lagraâ	20	0	18	0	2	0
8	MF	(Algeria) ALG	Bassam Chaouti	10	0	7	0	3	0
10	MF	(Algeria) ALG	Zakaria Mansouri	20	5	17	5	3	0
22	MF	(Algeria) ALG	Youcef Guertil	18	3	15	1	3	2
23	MF	(Algeria) ALG	Abdelhafid Benamara	14	0	12	0	2	0
24	MF	(Algeria) ALG	Hamza Heriat	12	0	12	0	0	0
25	MF	(Algeria) ALG	Abderraouf Chouiter	5	0	5	0	0	0
	MF	(Algeria) ALG	Abdelkader Boutiche	8	1	7	1	1	0
Forwards
7	FW	(Algeria) ALG	Zoubir Motrani	21	3	20	3	1	0
9	FW	(Algeria) ALG	Boumediene Freifer	15	3	12	1	3	2
11	FW	(Algeria) ALG	Rachid Nadji	16	4	13	2	3	2
19	FW	(Algeria) ALG	Mahi Benhamou	12	4	12	4	0	0
20	FW	(Algeria) ALG	Benamar Mellal	18	4	15	3	3	1
	FW	(Algeria) ALG	Nazim Itime	1	0	0	0	1	0
	FW	(Algeria) ALG	Abdelmalek Amara	3	0	2	0	1	0
	FW	(Algeria) ALG	Mohamed Itim	6	0	6	0	0	0
	FW	(Algeria) ALG	Abdelhak Abdelhafid	6	1	6	1	0	0
Players transferred out during the season
21	FW	(Algeria) ALG	Mohamed Amine Hamia	6	0	6	0	0	0

Last updated: 12 June 2018
Source: fr.soccerway.com

=== Goalscorers ===
Includes all competitive matches. The list is sorted alphabetically by surname when total goals are equal.

No.	Nat.	Player	Pos.	L 1	AC	TOTAL
10	(Algeria)	Zakaria Mansouri	MF	5	0	5
11	(Algeria)	Rachid Nadji	FW	2	2	4
19	(Algeria)	Mahi Benhamou	FW	4	0	4
20	(Algeria)	Benamar Mellal	FW	3	1	4
3	(Algeria)	Boualem Mesmoudi	DF	3	0	3
22	(Algeria)	Youcef Guertil	MF	0	0	3
7	(Algeria)	Zoubir Motrani	FW	3	0	3
9	(Algeria)	Boumediene Freifer	FW	1	2	3
29	(Algeria)	Senoussi Fourloul	DF	2	0	2
13	(Algeria)	Mohamed Amine Ezzemani	DF	0	1	1
27	(Algeria)	Kamel Hamidi	DF	0	1	1
	(Algeria)	Abdelkader Boutiche	MF	1	0	1
	(Algeria)	Abdelhak Abdelhafid	FW	1	0	1
Own Goals				0	0	0
Totals				28	9	37

== Squad list ==
As of 15 August 2019. Note: Flags indicate national team as defined under FIFA eligibility rules; some limited exceptions apply. Players may hold more than one non-FIFA nationality.

No.	Pos.	Nation	Player
1	GK	ALG	Sid Ahmed Rafik Mazouzi
3	DF	ALG	Boualem Mesmoudi
4	DF	ALG	Mourad Bendjelloul
6	MF	ALG	Mohamed Lagraâ
7	FW	ALG	Zoubir Motrani
8	MF	ALG	Bassam Chaouti
9	FW	ALG	Boumediene Freifer
10	MF	ALG	Zakaria Mansouri (on loan from Paradou AC)
11	FW	ALG	Rachid Nadji
12	DF	CIV	Vivien Assie
13	DF	ALG	Mohamed Amine Ezzemani
14	DF	ALG	Nadjib Hammadi
15	DF	ALG	Zine El-Abidine Sebbah (captain)

No.	Pos.	Nation	Player
16	GK	ALG	Mohamed Guetarni
17	DF	ALG	Zineddine Mekkaoui
19	FW	ALG	Mahi Benhamou
20	FW	ALG	Benamar Mellal
21	FW	ALG	Mohamed Amine Hamia
22	MF	ALG	Youcef Guertil
23	MF	ALG	Abdelhafid Benamara
24	MF	ALG	Hamza Heriat
25	MF	ALG	Raouf Chouiter
27	DF	ALG	Kamel Hamidi
29	DF	ALG	Senoussi Fourloul
30	GK	ALG	Oussama Litim

== Transfers ==
=== In ===
Date	Pos	Player	from club	Transfer fee	Source
24 June 2019	FW	(Algeria) Zoubir Motrani	Olympique de Médéa	Free transfer	
30 June 2019	DF	(Algeria) Mohamed Lagraâ	USM Bel Abbès	Free transfer	
1 July 2019	DF	(Algeria) Senoussi Fourloul	DRB Tadjenanet	Free transfer	
6 July 2019	FW	(Algeria) Mahi Benhamou	SA Mohammadia	Free transfer	
9 July 2019	MF	(Algeria) Bassam Chaouti	CA Bordj Bou Arreridj	Free transfer	
15 July 2019	GK	(Algeria) Mohamed Rabie Guitarni	SA Mohammadia	Free transfer	
20 July 2019	DF	(Algeria) Boualem Mesmoudi	USM Bel Abbès	Free transfer	
22 July 2019	FW	(Algeria) Mohamed Amine Hamia	USM Alger	Free transfer (Released)	
25 July 2019	FW	(Algeria) Abderraouf Chouiter	NA Hussein Dey	Free transfer	
20 January 2020	MF	(Algeria) Nazim Itime	OM Arzew	Free transfer	
22 January 2020	FW	(Algeria) Abdelhak Abdelhafid	NC Magra	Free transfer	
22 January 2020	MF	(Algeria) Abdelkader Boutiche	ASM Oran	Free transfer	

=== Out ===
Date	Pos	Player	To club	Transfer fee	Source
14 June 2019	DF	(Algeria) Réda Halaïmia	(Belgium) K Beerschot VA	Free transfer	
20 June 2019	FW	(Algeria) Mohamed Toumi	JS Saoura	Free transfer	
10 July 2019	MF	(Algeria) Sid Ahmed Aouadj	CS Constantine	Free transfer	
5 August 2019	DF	(Algeria) Brahim Boudebouda	CS Constantine	Free transfer	
21 January 2020	FW	(Algeria) Mohamed Amine Hamia	(Tunisia) CS Chebbien	Free transfer (Released)	
