= 2025–26 MC Oran season =

MC Oran
2025–26 season
- Owner: Hyproc Shipping Company
- President: Sidi Mohamed Hadjioui (from 2 July 2025)
- Head coach: Hubert Velud (from 10 August 2025) (until 18 August 2025); Juan Carlos Garrido (from 8 September 2025) (until 5 February 2026); Tahar Chérif El-Ouazzani (from 5 February 2026)
- Stadium: Miloud Hadefi Stadium
- Ligue 1: 4th
- Algerian Cup: Round of 64
- Top goalscorer: League: Ahmed Kerroum (5 goals); All: Ahmed Kerroum (6 goals)
- Biggest win: MC Oran 3–1 Paradou AC
- Biggest defeat: ES Sétif 3–0 MC Oran
Home colours	Away colours	Third colours

The 2025–26 season, is MC Oran's 60th season and the club's 17th consecutive season in the top flight of Algerian football. In addition to the domestic league, MC Oran are participating in the Algerian Cup. The Algerian Professional Football League (LFP) officially released the calendar for the 2025–26 Ligue 1 Mobilis season on July 10, 2025. The Ligue 1 will kick off on Thursday, August 21, 2025, and conclude with the 30th and final matchday on May 16, 2026. As in recent years, league matches will be held every Thursday, Friday, and Saturday, offering better scheduling balance and improved logistical conditions for clubs and broadcasters.

== Review ==
=== Background ===
On July 2, 2025, a new management team was appointed at SSPA/MCO by Hyproc Shipping Company, the club’s owning company. On this occasion, Hyproc CEO Adil Cherouati officially installed Sidi Mohamed Hadjioui as the new Chairman of the Board of Directors, succeeding Chakib Boumediene Ghomari. Several new members were also appointed to the board: Abderrahim Aouan, Fouzi Boudalia, Larbi Tarik, as well as Baroudi Bellellou, who currently serves as president of the amateur sports club CSA/MCO.

== Squad list ==
Players and squad numbers last updated on 31 January 2026.
Note: Flags indicate national team as has been defined under FIFA eligibility rules. Players may hold more than one non-FIFA nationality.

No.	Nat.	Name	Position	Date of birth (age)	Signed from	Signed in	Contract ends	Apps	Goals
Goalkeepers
1	(Algeria)	Moustapha Zeghba	GK	21 November 1990 (aged 34)	(Algeria) CR Belouizdad	2026	2027	0	0
16	(Algeria)	Mokhtar Ferrahi	GK	24 January 1996 (aged 29)	(Algeria) Paradou AC	2025	2027	0	0
30	(Algeria)	Anis Mendil	GK	14 November 2005 (aged 19)	(Algeria) Reserve team	2024	2025	1	0
Defenders
2	(Algeria)	Kelyan Guessoum	CB	5 February 1999 (aged 26)	(Bulgaria) Etar Veliko Tarnovo	2024	2027	23	0
3	(Algeria)	Abdelkarim Mammar	CB	21 October 1996 (aged 28)	(Sweden) Degerfors IF	2024	2027	30	1
5	(Algeria)	Ibrahim Hachoud	CB	5 March 2000 (aged 25)	(Libya) Al Hilal	2025	2027	0	0
12	(Algeria)	Oussama Kaddour	LB	12 May 1997 (aged 28)	(Algeria) USM Khenchela	2025	2028	0	0
20	(Algeria)	Mokhtar Belkhiter	RB	15 January 1992 (aged 33)	(Algeria) ASO Chlef	2025	2027	0	0
22	(Algeria)	Abdelkader Belharrane	RB	11 August 2000 (aged 25)	(Algeria) USM Alger	2023	2025	52	0
23	(Algeria)	Abderrahim Hamra	CB	21 July 1997 (aged 28)	(Algeria) ASO Chlef	2025	2028	0	0
24	(Algeria)	Ahmed Kerroum	CB	27 June 2000 (aged 25)	(Algeria) ASO Chlef	2024	2026	48	5
28	(Algeria)	Toufik Addi	LB	21 January 2005 (aged 20)	(Algeria) Reserve team	2025	2028	0	0
Midfielders
4	(Algeria)	Abderrahmane Bourdim	AM	14 June 1994 (aged 31)	(Algeria) ASO Chlef	2025	2027	0	0
6	(Algeria)	Omar Embarek	DM	11 November 1998 (aged 26)	(Algeria) USM Alger	2025	2027	0	0
8	(Algeria)	Juba Aguieb	AM	28 November 1996 (aged 28)	(Algeria) ASO Chlef	2024	2026	31	2
10	(Algeria)	Bilal Benkhedim	AM	20 April 2001 (aged 24)	(Luxembourg) F91 Dudelange	2026	2028	0	0
14	(Guinea)	Ousmane Coumbassa	DM	27 July 2001 (aged 24)	(Tunisia) ES Zarzis	2026	2028	0	0
15	(Botswana)	Gape Mohutsiwa	DM	20 March 1997 (aged 28)	(Algeria) ASO Chlef	2025	2027	0	0
17	(Algeria)	Chakib Aoudjane	CM	12 June 1996 (aged 29)	(Algeria) ES Mostaganem	2025	2027	0	0
25	(Algeria)	Oussama Fatmi	DM	26 September 2005 (aged 19)	(Algeria) Reserve team	2025	2028	0	0
Forwards
7	(Guinea)	Sékou Damaro Bangoura	LW	1 January 2006 (aged 19)	(Guinea) Hafia FC	2026	2028	0	0
9	(Algeria)	Yacine Goudjil	ST	26 June 2005 (aged 20)	(Algeria) Reserve team	2025	2028	0	0
11	(Mali)	Boubacar Traoré	ST	14 December 1999 (aged 25)	(Libya) Al-Ahly	2026	2028	0	0
19	(Algeria)	Ilyes Miloudi	LW	10 March 2005 (aged 20)	(Algeria) Reserve team	2025	2028	0	0
21	(Algeria)	Abdelaziz Moulay	RW	20 April 1999 (aged 26)	(Algeria) ES Sétif	2025	2027	0	0
27	(Algeria)	Yacine Aliane	LW	28 August 1999 (aged 25)	(Algeria) ASO Chlef	2024	2027	20	0
29	(Algeria)	Mounir Mahadene	RW	3 April 2005 (aged 20)	(Algeria) Reserve team	2024	2026	4	0

== Transfers ==
=== In ===
==== Summer ====
Date	Pos	Player	Moving from	Fee	Source
7 July 2025	DF	(Algeria) Oussama Kaddour	USM Khenchela	Free transfer	
14 July 2025	DF	(Algeria) Abderrahim Hamra	ASO Chlef	Free transfer	
16 July 2025	MF	(Algeria) Chakib Aoudjane	ES Mostaganem	Free transfer	
24 July 2025	MF	(Botswana) Gape Mohutsiwa	ASO Chlef	Free transfer	
25 July 2025	DF	(Algeria) Mokhtar Belkhiter	ASO Chlef	Free transfer	
17 August 2025	DM	(Algeria) Omar Embarek	USM Alger	Free transfer	
31 August 2025	GK	(Algeria) Mokhtar Ferrahi	Paradou AC	Free transfer	
31 August 2025	CB	(Algeria) Ibrahim Hachoud	(Libya) Al Hilal	Free transfer	

==== Winter ====
Date	Pos	Player	Moving from	Fee	Source
8 January 2026	DM	(Guinea) Ousmane Coumbassa	(Tunisia) ES Zarzis	Undisclosed	
21 January 2026	AM	(Algeria) Bilal Benkhedim	(Luxembourg) F91 Dudelange	Undisclosed	
28 January 2026	ST	(Mali) Boubacar Traoré	(Libya) Al-Ahly	Undisclosed	
29 January 2026	LW	(Guinea) Sékou Damaro Bangoura	(Guinea) Hafia FC	Undisclosed	
29 January 2026	GK	(Algeria) Moustapha Zeghba	CR Belouizdad	Free transfer	

=== Out ===
==== Summer ====
Date	Pos	Player	Moving to	Fee	Source
25 July 2025	MF	(Algeria) Abdelhafid Benamara	ES Mostaganem	Free transfer	
25 July 2025	FW	(Algeria) Zoubir Motrani	ES Mostaganem	Free transfer	
31 July 2025	FW	(Algeria) Karim Aribi	(Iraq) Al-Talaba SC	Free transfer	
7 August 2025	DF	(Algeria) Oussama Benatia	JS Kabylie	Free transfer	

==== Winter ====
Date	Pos	Player	Moving to	Fee	Source
3 January 2026	AM	(Algeria) Chahreddine Boukholda	MC Alger	Undisclosed	
16 January 2026	ST	(The Gambia) Pa Omar Jobe	Unattached	Free transfer (Released)	
18 January 2026	ST	(Ghana) Maxwell Baakoh	Unattached	Free transfer (Released)	
19 January 2026	DM	(Algeria) Seddik Senhadji	Unattached	Free transfer (Released)	
29 January 2026	GK	(Algeria) Léonard Aggoune	Unattached	Free transfer	

== Competitions ==
=== Overview ===
Competition	Record								Started round	Final position / round	First match	Last match
Competition	G	W	D	L	GF	GA	GD	Win %	Started round	Final position / round	First match	Last match
Ligue 1	30	14	7	9	36	31	+5	46.67	—N/a	4th	21 August 2025	6 June 2026
Algerian Cup	1	0	0	1	1	2	−1	0.00	Round of 64	Round of 64	5 December 2025	5 December 2025
Total	31	14	7	10	37	33	+4	45.16				

Updated to match played 6 June 2026
Source: Competitions

=== Ligue 1 ===
==== League table ====
Pos	Team	Pld	W	D	L	GF	GA	GD	Pts	Qualification or relegation
2	JS Saoura	30	16	7	7	40	26	+14	55	Qualification for CAF Champions League
3	CR Belouizdad	30	14	11	5	47	24	+23	53	Qualification for CAF Confederation Cup
4	MC Oran	30	14	7	9	36	31	+5	49	
5	JS Kabylie	30	11	12	7	40	31	+9	45	
6	Olympique Akbou	30	12	9	9	34	31	+3	45	

Source: lfp.dz
Rules for classification: 1) Points; 2) Head-to-head points; 3) Head-to-head goal difference; 4) First half goal difference; 5) First half total goals; 6) Fairplay ranking; 7) Playoff.

==== Results summary ====
Overall								Home						Away					
Pld	W	D	L	GF	GA	GD	Pts	W	D	L	GF	GA	GD	W	D	L	GF	GA	GD
30	14	7	9	36	31	+5	49	9	5	1	21	10	+11	5	2	8	15	21	−6

Last updated: 6 June 2026.
Source: Competitive matches

==== Results by round ====
Round	1	2	3	4	5	6	7	8	9	10	11	12	13	14	15	16	17	18	19	20	21	22	23	24	25	26	27	28	29	30
Ground	H	A	H	H	A	H	A	H	A	H	A	H	A	H	A	A	H	A	A	H	A	H	A	H	A	H	A	H	A	H
Result	W	L	D	W	L	W	L	D	W	W	W	D	L	D	D	L	L	D	W	W	W	W	L	W	W	W	L	W	L	D
Position	4	9	11	3	7	5	6	9	4	3	2	2	4	4	4	6	8	8	7	6	5	4	6	5	4	3	4	4	4	4

Updated to match(es) played on 6 June 2026. Source: Competitive matches
A = Away; H = Home; W = Win; D = Draw; L = Loss

==== Matches ====
The league fixtures were announced on 31 July 2025.

All times are local, WAT (UTC+1).

Win Draw Loss Postponed

21 August 2025 Round 1	MC Oran	2–1	ES Ben Aknoun	Bir El Djir
18:00	Moulay 60'; Boukholda 65'	Soccerway; LFP	Mammar 54' (o.g.)	Stadium: Miloud Hadefi Stadium; Attendance: 0 (close doors); Referee: Houia Dhikra; VAR: Mehdi Oukil

29 August 2025 Round 2	Olympique Akbou	1–0	MC Oran	Béjaïa
17:00	Mehdaoui 45+2'	Soccerway; LFP		Stadium: Maghrebi Unity Stadium; Referee: Abderahmane Sahraoui

5 September 2025 Round 3	MC Oran	0–0	ES Mostaganem	Bir El Djir
19:00		Soccerway; LFP		Stadium: Miloud Hadefi Stadium; Referee: Akram Mechairia; VAR: Rafik Aouina

12 September 2025 Round 4	MC Oran	2–0	JS Kabylie	Bir El Djir
19:00	Aoudjane 53'; Boukholda 89' (pen.)	Soccerway; LFP		Stadium: Miloud Hadefi Stadium; Referee: Tahar Boudjemaa; VAR: Lahlou Benbraham

16 September 2025 Round 5	MC Alger	3–2	MC Oran	Douéra
19:00	Naidji 15'; Bayazid 37'; Hamadouche 90+3'	Soccerway; LFP	Mohutsiwa 32'; Moulay 68'	Stadium: Ali La Pointe Stadium; Attendance: 0 (close doors); Referee: Mehdi Oukil; VAR: Redouane Allou

27 September 2025 Round 6	MC Oran	3–1	Paradou AC	Bir El Djir
17:45	Abdelkader 46'; Boukholda 61'; Aoudjane 64'	Soccerway; LFP	Ramdaoui 31'	Stadium: Miloud Hadefi Stadium; Referee: Yahia Dehar; VAR: Anes Azrine

4 October 2025 Round 7	USM Khenchela	2–0	MC Oran	Khenchela
15:00	Ezzemani 58'; Chekal 66'	Soccerway; LFP		Stadium: Amar Hamam Stadium; Referee: Anes Azrine

18 October 2025 Round 8	MC Oran	1–1	JS Saoura	Bir El Djir
18:00	Hamra 18'	Soccerway; LFP	Boutiche 90+13' (pen.)	Stadium: Miloud Hadefi Stadium; Referee: Rafiq Aouina

25 October 2025 Round 9	MC El Bayadh	0–2	MC Oran	El Bayadh
15:00		Soccerway; LFP	Aoudjane 35'; Kerroum 51' (pen.)	Stadium: Zakaria Medjdoub Stadium; Referee: Ayoub Belhachemi

1 November 2025 Round 10	MC Oran	1–0	CS Constantine	Bir El Djir
18:00	Moulay 56'	Soccerway; LFP		Stadium: Miloud Hadefi Stadium; Referee: Tahar Boudjemaa

8 November 2025 Round 11	MB Rouissat	1–3	MC Oran	Ouargla
17:00	Fatawu 43'	Soccerway; LFP	Boukholda 17'; Aliane 71'; Hamra 76'	Stadium: 18 February Stadium; Referee: Alaa Bouab

20 November 2025 Round 12	MC Oran	0–0	ES Sétif	Bir El Djir
19:00		Soccerway; LFP		Stadium: Miloud Hadefi Stadium; Referee: Yahia Dahar

18 December 2025 Round 13	ASO Chlef	1–0	MC Oran	Chlef
17:00	Sadahine 45+3'	Soccerway; LFP		Stadium: Mohamed Boumezrag Stadium; Referee: Akram Mechairia

29 December 2025 Round 14	MC Oran	1–1	CR Belouizdad	Bir El Djir
17:00	Kerroum 53' (pen.)	Soccerway; LFP	Ben Hammouda 70'	Stadium: Miloud Hadefi Stadium; Referee: Rafik Aouina

8 January 2026 Round 15	USM Alger	1–1	MC Oran	Algiers
20:00	Alilet 51'	Soccerway; LFP	Aliane 90+4'	Stadium: Stade du 5 Juillet; Referee: Mehdi Oukil

24 January 2026 Round 16	ES Ben Aknoun	2–1	MC Oran	Belouizdad
14:00	Sylla 12'; Hachoud 37'	Soccerway; LFP	Bourdim 42'	Stadium: 20 August 1955 Stadium; Referee: Akram Mechairia

3 February 2026 Round 17	MC Oran	0–1	Olympique Akbou	Oran
17:00		Soccerway; LFP	Sediri 82'	Stadium: Ahmed Zabana Stadium; Referee: Fateh Harkat

7 February 2026 Round 18	ES Mostaganem	0–0	MC Oran	Sidi Ali
15:00		Soccerway; LFP		Stadium: Larbi Belhamiti Stadium; Referee: Lotfi Bekouassa

20 February 2026 Round 20	MC Oran	2–1	MC Alger	Bir El Djir
22:00	Traoré 25'; Abdellaoui 90+4' (o.g.)	Soccerway; LFP	Ferhat 41'	Stadium: Miloud Hadefi Stadium; Referee: Alaa Bouab

27 February 2026 Round 21	Paradou AC	1–2	MC Oran	Dar El Beïda
14:30	Tahar 79'	Soccerway; LFP	Traoré 12'; Belharrane 90+7'	Stadium: Omar Benrabah Stadium; Referee: Tahar Boudjemaa

6 March 2026 Round 22	MC Oran	2–1	USM Khenchela	Bir El Djir
22:00	Aliane 87'; Bourdim 90+2'	Soccerway; LFP	Etouga 24'	Stadium: Miloud Hadefi Stadium; Referee: Lahlou Benbraham

13 March 2026 Round 23	JS Saoura	2–0	MC Oran	Béchar
22:00	Yusuf 35'; Bentaleb 90+6'	Soccerway; LFP		Stadium: 20 August 1955 Stadium; Referee: Mehdi Oukil

17 March 2026 Round 24	MC Oran	2–0	MC El Bayadh	Bir El Djir
22:00	Kerroum 75' (pen.); Aoudjane 78'	Soccerway; LFP		Stadium: Miloud Hadefi Stadium; Referee: Akram Mechairia

3 April 2026 Round 25	CS Constantine	0–1	MC Oran	Constantine
18:00		Soccerway; LFP	Bourdim 20'	Stadium: Chahid Hamlaoui Stadium; Referee: Anes Azrine

9 April 2026 Round 26	MC Oran	2–1	MB Rouissat	Bir El Djir
17:45	Belkhiter 50'; Aoudjane 57'	Soccerway; LFP	Merzougui 44'	Stadium: Miloud Hadefi Stadium; Referee: Lotfi Bekouassa

17 April 2026 Round 27	ES Sétif	3–0	MC Oran	Sétif
17:45	Boukerma 45+4', 57'; Hamek 70'	Soccerway; LFP		Stadium: 8 May 1945 Stadium; Referee: Alaa Bouab

29 April 2026 Round 19	JS Kabylie	1–2	MC Oran	Tizi Ouzou
17:45	Mahious 45+10' (pen.)	Soccerway; LFP	Kerroum 58' (pen.); Bourdim 90+2'	Stadium: Hocine Aït Ahmed Stadium; Referee: Rafik Aouina

7 May 2026 Round 28	MC Oran	1–0	ASO Chlef	Bir El Djir
20:00	Kerroum 59'	Soccerway; LFP		Stadium: Miloud Hadefi Stadium; Referee: Lahlou Benbraham

20 May 2026 Round 29	CR Belouizdad	3–1	MC Oran	Baraki
20:00	Ben Hammouda 33'; Khacef 84'; Kelaleche 86'	Soccerway; LFP	Hamra 74'	Stadium: Nelson Mandela Stadium; Referee: Mehdi Oukil

6 June 2026 Round 30	MC Oran	2–2	USM Alger	Bir El Djir
18:00	Moulay 76'; Benkhedim 78'	Soccerway; LFP	Boutaoui 25'; Chetti 27'	Stadium: Miloud Hadefi Stadium; Referee: Fateh Harkat

=== Algerian Cup ===
4 December 2025 Round of 64	MC Oran	1–2	ES Mostaganem	Bir El Djir
17:00	Kerroum 45+7' (pen.)	Report	Motrani 69'; Askar 74'	Stadium: Miloud Hadefi Stadium; Referee: Anes Azrine

== Squad information ==
=== Appearances and goals ===
As of 6 June 2025

No.	Pos	Player	Nat	Ligue 1			Algerian Cup			Total		
No.	Pos	Player	Nat	App	St	G	App	St	G	App	St	G
Goalkeepers
1	GK	Moustapha Zeghba	(Algeria)	12	12	0	0	0	0	12	12	0
16	GK	Mokhtar Ferrahi	(Algeria)	3	1	0	1	1	0	4	2	0
30	GK	Anis Mendil	(Algeria)	3	3	0	0	0	0	3	3	0
Defenders
2	CB	Kelyan Guessoum	(Algeria)	0	0	0	0	0	0	0	0	0
3	CB	Abdelkarim Mammar	(Algeria)	24	13	0	1	1	0	25	14	0
5	CB	Ibrahim Hachoud	(Algeria)	21	18	0	1	1	0	22	19	0
12	LB	Oussama Kaddour	(Algeria)	18	13	0	0	0	0	18	13	0
20	RB	Mokhtar Belkhiter	(Algeria)	30	27	1	1	1	0	31	28	1
22	RB	Abdelkader Belharrane	(Algeria)	14	5	1	0	0	0	14	5	1
23	CB	Abderrahim Hamra	(Algeria)	27	25	3	1	0	0	28	25	3
24	CB	Ahmed Kerroum	(Algeria)	23	22	5	1	1	1	24	23	6
28	LB	Toufik Addi	(Algeria)	0	0	0	0	0	0	0	0	0
Midfielders
4	AM	Abderrahmane Bourdim	(Algeria)	18	7	4	0	0	0	18	4	4
6	DM	Omar Embarek	(Algeria)	26	24	0	1	1	0	27	25	0
8	AM	Juba Aguieb	(Algeria)	28	28	0	1	1	0	29	29	0
10	AM	Bilal Benkhedim	(Algeria)	4	1	1	0	0	0	4	1	1
14	DM	Ousmane Coumbassa	(Guinea)	14	9	0	0	0	0	14	9	0
15	DM	Gape Mohutsiwa	(Botswana)	25	9	1	1	1	0	26	10	1
17	AM	Chakib Aoudjane	(Algeria)	29	22	5	1	1	0	30	23	5
25	DM	Oussama Fatmi	(Algeria)	1	0	0	0	0	0	1	0	0
56	DM	Mohammed Benhakim	(Algeria)	4	0	0	0	0	0	4	0	0
Forwards
7	LW	Sékou Damaro Bangoura	(Guinea)	7	5	0	0	0	0	7	5	0
9	ST	Yacine Goudjil	(Algeria)	9	3	0	0	0	0	9	3	0
11	ST	Boubacar Traoré	(Mali)	11	9	2	0	0	0	11	9	2
19	LW	Ilyes Miloudi	(Algeria)	1	0	0	0	0	0	1	0	0
21	RW	Abdelaziz Moulay	(Algeria)	30	27	5	1	1	0	31	28	5
27	LW	Yacine Aliane	(Algeria)	25	13	3	1	0	0	26	13	3
29	RW	Mounir Mehdi Mahadene	(Algeria)	12	7	0	0	0	0	12	7	0
51	ST	Mohamed Benaissa	(Algeria)	0	0	0	1	0	0	0	0	0
Players transferred out during the season
~~10~~	AM	Chahreddine Boukholda	(Algeria)	13	11	4	1	0	0	14	11	4
~~11~~	ST	Pa Omar Jobe	(The Gambia)	6	2	0	0	0	0	6	2	0
~~7~~	RW	Maxwell Baakoh	(Ghana)	9	1	0	1	1	0	10	2	0
~~13~~	DM	Seddik Senhadji	(Algeria)	4	1	0	0	0	0	4	1	0
~~1~~	GK	Léonard Aggoune	(Algeria)	13	0	0	0	0	0	13	0	0
Total				30		36	1		1	31		37

Last updated: 6 June 2026
Source: soccerway.com

=== Goalscorers ===
As of 6 June 2026

Includes all competitive matches.

No.	Nat.	Player	Pos.	L1	AC	TOTAL
24	(Algeria)	Ahmed Kerroum	CB	5	1	6
17	(Algeria)	Chakib Aoudjane	AM	5	0	5
21	(Algeria)	Abdelaziz Moulay	RW	5	0	5
4	(Algeria)	Abderrahmane Bourdim	AM	4	0	4
27	(Algeria)	Yacine Aliane	LW	3	0	3
23	(Algeria)	Abderrahim Hamra	CB	3	0	3
11	(Mali)	Boubacar Traoré	ST	2	0	2
15	(Botswana)	Gape Mohutsiwa	DM	1	0	1
22	(Algeria)	Abdelkader Belharrane	RB	1	0	1
20	(Algeria)	Mokhtar Belkhiter	RB	1	0	1
10	(Algeria)	Bilal Benkhedim	AM	1	0	1
Players transferred out during the season
~~10~~	(Algeria)	Chahreddine Boukholda	AM	4	0	4
Own Goals				1	0	1
Totals				36	1	37

=== Clean sheets ===
As of 6 June 2026

Includes all competitive matches.

					Clean sheets		
No.	Nat	Name	GP	GA	L1	AC	Total
1	(Algeria)	Moustapha Zeghba	12	10	5	0	5
16	(Algeria)	Mokhtar Ferrahi	4	8	0	0	0
30	(Algeria)	Anis Mendil	3	2	1	0	1
Players transferred out during the season
~~1~~	(Algeria)	Léonard Aggoune	14	13	5	0	5
		TOTALS		33	11	0	11
