= 2022–23 MC Oran season =

MC Oran
2022–23 season
- President: Youcef Djebbari
- Head coach: Omar Belatoui (from 29 August 2022)
- Stadium: Ahmed Zabana Stadium
- Ligue 1: 10th
- Algerian Cup: Round of 64
- Top goalscorer: League: Mourad Benayad (4 goals); All: Mourad Benayad (4 goals)
- Biggest win: MC Oran 3–0 MC Alger
- Biggest defeat: ES Sétif 4–0 MC Oran; JS Kabylie 4–0 MC Oran; Paradou AC 4–0 MC Oran
Home colours	Away colours

The 2022–23 season, was MC Oran's 57th season and the club's 14th consecutive season in the top flight of Algerian football. In addition to the domestic league, MC Oran participated in the Algerian Cup.

== Squad list ==
Players and squad numbers last updated on 25 August 2022.
Note: Flags indicate national team as has been defined under FIFA eligibility rules. Players may hold more than one non-FIFA nationality.

No.	Nat.	Position	Name	Date of birth (age)	Signed from
Goalkeepers
1	(Algeria)	GK	Athmane Toual	17 July 1984 (aged 38)	Unattached
16	(Algeria)	GK	Kamel Soufi	5 June 1996 (aged 26)	(Algeria) WA Tlemcen
20	(Algeria)	GK	Bachir Della Krachai	18 August 1996 (aged 26)	(Algeria) ASM Oran
Defenders
2	(Algeria)	CB	Benali Benamar	January 12, 1995 (aged 27)	(Algeria) Olympique de Médéa
3	(Algeria)	RB	Sofiane Khadir	3 August 1994 (aged 28)	(Algeria) NA Hussein Dey
4	(Algeria)	CB	Mohamed Naâmani	September 21, 1990 (aged 32)	(Saudi Arabia) Al Fateh
5	(Algeria)	LB	Djamel Ibouzidène	22 January 1994 (aged 27)	(Algeria) NC Magra
7	(Algeria)	LB	Hichem Talha	August 14, 1999 (aged 23)	(Algeria) MC Saïda
11	(Algeria)	CB	Abderrahmane Nehari	9 April 1994 (aged 28)	(Algeria) Olympique de Médéa
12	(Algeria)	LB	Mohamed Amine Ezzemani	November 27, 1994 (aged 28)	(Algeria) MC Alger
15	(Algeria)	RB	Senoussi Fourloul	March 15, 1991 (aged 31)	(Algeria) ASO Chlef
19	(Algeria)	CB	Zakaria Khali	10 May 1990 (aged 32)	(Algeria) CR Belouizdad
Midfielders
6	(Algeria)	MF	Mohamed Lagraâ	November 7, 1986 (aged 36)	(Algeria) USM Bel Abbès
8	(Algeria)	MF	Salim Bennai	25 March 1997 (aged 25)	(Algeria) NA Hussein Dey
10	(Algeria)	MF	Amine Abed Abbassi	29 January 1991 (aged 31)	(Algeria) CR Témouchent
13	(Algeria)	MF	Yasser Belaribi	22 June 1999 (aged 23)	(Algeria) WA Tlemcen
18	(Algeria)	MF	Mohamed Bengrina	24 March 1996 (aged 26)	(Algeria) ASO Chlef
23	(Algeria)	MF	Abdelhafid Benamara	October 1, 1995 (aged 27)	(Algeria) USM El Harrach
24	(Algeria)	MF	Seddik Senhadji	3 November 2000 (aged 22)	(Algeria) CR Témouchent
25	(Algeria)	MF	Imed Saihi	11 August 2000 (aged 22)	(Algeria) WA Mostaganem
27	(Algeria)	MF	Aymen Chadli	3 September 1999 (aged 23)	(Algeria) RC Relizane
Forwards
9	(Algeria)	FW	Belkacem Yadaden	25 January 1995 (aged 27)	(Algeria) HB Chelghoum Laïd
14	(Algeria)	FW	Mourad Benayad	25 September 1990 (aged 32)	(Algeria) NA Hussein Dey
17	(Algeria)	FW	Ameur Bouguettaya	21 July 1995 (aged 27)	(Algeria) ASO Chlef
21	(Algeria)	FW	Hamza Belahouel	8 June 1993 (aged 29)	(Algeria) CS Constantine
22	(Algeria)	FW	Mahi Benhamou	November 12, 1995 (aged 27)	(Algeria) CR Belouizdad
26	(Algeria)	FW	Merouane Dahar	25 December 1992 (aged 30)	(Algeria) AS Ain M'lila

== Transfers ==
=== Out ===
==== Summer ====
Date	Pos	Player	To club	Transfer fee	Source
25 July 2022	FW	(Algeria) Adil Djabout	(Saudi Arabia) Ohod	Free transfer	
6 August 2022	FW	(Algeria) Yacine Guenina	JS Kabylie	Free transfer	
17 August 2022	RB	(Algeria) Walid Alati	MC El Bayadh	Free transfer	
18 August 2022	MF	(Algeria) Bassam Chaouti	ES Sétif	Free transfer	

== Competitions ==
=== Overview ===
Competition	Record								Started round	Final position / round	First match	Last match
Competition	G	W	D	L	GF	GA	GD	Win %	Started round	Final position / round	First match	Last match
Ligue 1	30	11	8	11	27	34	−7	36.67	—N/a	10th	26 August 2022	15 July 2023
Algerian Cup	1	0	1	0	1	1	+0	0.00	Round of 64	Round of 64	25 November 2022	25 November 2022
Total	31	11	9	11	28	35	−7	35.48				

Updated to match played 15 July 2023
Source: Competitions

=== Ligue 1 ===
==== League table ====
Pos	Team	Pld	W	D	L	GF	GA	GD	Pts	Qualification or relegation
8	USM Khenchela	30	12	6	12	29	29	0	42	
9	Paradou AC	30	11	8	11	35	33	+2	41	
10	MC Oran	30	11	8	11	27	34	−7	41	
11	USM Alger	30	11	7	12	31	30	+1	40	Qualification for CAF Confederation Cup (Note: USMA Alger qualified for the 2023–24 CAF Confederation Cup as the title holders.)
12	US Biskra	30	10	10	10	30	29	+1	40	

Updated to match(es) played on 15 July 2023. Source: the-sports.org
Rules for classification: 1) points; 2) head-to-head points; 3) head-to-head goal difference; 4) goal difference; 5) total goals; 6) fairplay ranking; 7) playoff.

==== Results summary ====
Overall								Home						Away					
Pld	W	D	L	GF	GA	GD	Pts	W	D	L	GF	GA	GD	W	D	L	GF	GA	GD
30	11	8	11	27	34	−7	41	10	5	0	21	6	+15	1	3	11	6	28	−22

Last updated: 15 July 2023.
Source: Competitive matches

==== Results by round ====
Round	1	2	3	4	5	6	7	8	9	10	11	12	13	14	15	16	17	18	19	20	21	22	23	24	25	26	27	28	29	30
Ground	A	H	A	H	A	H	A	H	A	H	A	H	A	H	A	H	A	H	A	H	A	H	A	H	A	H	A	H	A	H
Result	L	D	L	D	D	W	L	W	W	W	D	L	W	L	W	W	L	W	L	D	D	D	L	W	L	D	W	L	W	L
Position	13	12	13	12	14	12	14	13	9	7	8	8	8	9	8	7	7	7	7	7	8	8	9	9	9	9	9	9	8	10

Updated to match(es) played on 15 July 2023. Source: Competitive matches
A = Away; H = Home; W = Win; D = Draw; L = Loss

==== Matches ====
The league fixtures were announced on 19 July 2022.

26 August 2022 Round 1	RC Arbaâ	3–1	MC Oran	Larbaâ
17:00	Kessili 45+2'; Taib 62'; Toumi 84'	Report	Belaribi 18'	Stadium: Ismaïl Makhlouf Stadium; Referee: Anes Azrine

2 September 2022 Round 2	MC Oran	0–0	NC Magra	Oran
20:00		Report		Stadium: Ahmed Zabana Stadium; Referee: Abderrezzak Arab

6 September 2022 Round 3	CR Belouizdad	2–0	MC Oran	Belouizdad
16:30	Aribi 14' (pen.), 44'	Report		Stadium: 20 August 1955 Stadium; Referee: Mohamed Tahar Milia

17 September 2022 Round 4	MC Oran	0–0	ASO Chlef	Oran
19:00		Report		Stadium: Ahmed Zabana Stadium; Referee: Lyes Bekouassa

24 September 2022 Round 5	CS Constantine	0–0	MC Oran	Constantine
16:30		Report		Stadium: Ramadane Ben Abdelmalek Stadium; Referee: Anes Azrine

2 October 2022 Round 6	MC Oran	1–0	USM Alger	Oran
20:00	Khadir 61'	Report		Stadium: Ahmed Zabana Stadium; Referee: Mehdi Abid Charef

8 October 2022 Round 7	USM Khenchela	1–0	MC Oran	Khenchela
15:00	Baakoh 7'	Report		Stadium: Amar Hamam Stadium; Referee: Malik Ait Ameur

22 October 2022 Round 9	HB Chelghoum Laïd	1–2	MC Oran	Chelghoum Laïd
15:00	Belamri 81'	Report	Benayad 18'; Fourloul 46'	Stadium: 11 December 1961 Stadium; Referee: Redouane Allou

5 November 2022 Round 10	MC Oran	1–0	Paradou AC	Oran
18:00	Naâmani 54'	Report		Stadium: Ahmed Zabana Stadium; Referee: Nadjib Meziani

12 November 2022 Round 11	MC El Bayadh	1–1	MC Oran	El Bayadh
15:00	Barkat 45'	Report	Belaribi 49'	Stadium: Zakaria Medjdoub Stadium; Referee: Hamza Bouslimani

29 November 2022 Round 12	ES Sétif	4–0	MC Oran	Sétif
18:00	Guenaoui 32', 37'; Aouissi 79'; Askar 89'	Report		Stadium: 8 May 1945 Stadium; Referee: El Hadj Aissa Semmache

7 December 2022 Round 13	MC Oran	3–0	MC Alger	Oran
18:00	Benamar 27'; Naâmani 48'; Benayad 73'	Report		Stadium: Ahmed Zabana Stadium; Referee: Youcef Gamouh

11 December 2022 Round 14	JS Saoura	1–0	MC Oran	Béchar
17:00	Saâd 20'	Report		Stadium: 20 August 1955 Stadium; Referee: Mohamed Tahar Milia

20 December 2022 Round 8	MC Oran	2–1	JS Kabylie	Oran
18:00	Benhamou 51'; Chadli 83'	Report	Talah 58'	Stadium: Ahmed Zabana Stadium; Referee: Houssam Benyahia

24 December 2022 Round 15	MC Oran	1–0	US Biskra	Oran
15:00	Ezzemani 81' (pen.)	Report		Stadium: Ahmed Zabana Stadium; Referee: Anes Azrine

12 February 2023 Round 16	MC Oran	2–1	RC Arbaâ	Oran
18:00	Ezzemani 19' (pen.); Dahar 64'	Report	Toumi 31'	Stadium: Ahmed Zabana Stadium; Referee: Rafik Aouina

19 February 2023 Round 17	NC Magra	2–0	MC Oran	Magra
15:00	Banouh 23' (pen.); El Orfi 66'	Report		Stadium: Boucheligue Brothers Stadium; Referee: Radouane Alou

11 March 2023 Round 19	ASO Chlef	2–1	MC Oran	Chlef
15:00	Souibaâh 36' (pen.); Fettouhi 47'	Report	Naâmani 67'	Stadium: Mohamed Boumezrag Stadium; Referee: Hamza Bouslimani

17 March 2023 Round 20	MC Oran	0–0	CS Constantine	Oran
15:00		Report		Stadium: Ahmed Zabana Stadium; Referee: Bilal Soltani

8 April 2023 Round 22	MC Oran	1–1	USM Khenchela	Oran
22:00	Nehari 73'	Report	Bayazid 90+4'	Stadium: Ahmed Zabana Stadium; Referee: Mohamed Amine Benzohra

17 April 2023 Round 18	MC Oran	3–1	CR Belouizdad	Oran
22:30	Belaribi 5'; Saihi 39'; Dahar 72' (pen.)	Report	Reghba 33'	Stadium: Ahmed Zabana Stadium; Referee: Nadjib Meziani

18 May 2023 Round 23	JS Kabylie	4–0	MC Oran	Tizi Ouzou
18:00	Mouaki 12' (pen.); Redjem 42'; Boualia 60', 86'	Report		Stadium: 1 November 1954 Stadium; Referee: Akram Mechairia

31 May 2023 Round 24	MC Oran	2–0	HB Chelghoum Laïd	Oran
18:00	Benayad 15'; Amrane 58' (o.g.)	Report		Stadium: Ahmed Zabana Stadium; Referee: Mohamed Makfoudji

6 June 2023 Round 25	Paradou AC	4–0	MC Oran	Dar El Beïda
16:30	Hamidi 41' (pen.); Douar 51' (pen.); Kohili 69' (pen.); Boukerma 82'	Report		Stadium: Omar Benrabah Stadium; Referee: Nadjib Meziani

10 June 2023 Round 21	USM Alger	0–0	MC Oran	Baraki
17:00		Report		Stadium: Nelson Mandela Stadium; Referee: Akram Mechairia

1 July 2023 Round 26	MC Oran	1–1	MC El Bayadh	Oran
17:00	Benamara 63'	Report	Khalfallah 79'	Stadium: Ahmed Zabana Stadium; Referee: Anes Azrine

4 July 2023 Round 27	MC Oran	3–1	ES Sétif	Oran
17:00	Bouguettaya 58'; Saihi 73'; Benhamou 90'	Report	Boucif 90+5'	Stadium: Ahmed Zabana Stadium; Referee: Hamza Bouslimani

7 July 2023 Round 28	MC Alger	1–0	MC Oran	Dar El Beïda
17:15	Debbih 74'	Report		Stadium: Omar Benrabah Stadium; Referee: Mohamed Tahar Milia

10 July 2023 Round 29	MC Oran	1–0	JS Saoura	Oran
17:15	Benamara 72'	Report		Stadium: Ahmed Zabana Stadium; Referee: Elhadj Chihaoui

15 July 2023 Round 30	US Biskra	2–1	MC Oran	Biskra
17:15	Siam 4'; Dakhia 34'	Report	Benayad 85'	Stadium: 18 February Stadium; Referee: Billel Soltani

=== Algerian Cup ===
25 November 2022 Round of 64	MC Oran	1–1 (a.e.t.) (3–4 p)	Olympique Akbou	Oran
15:00	Fourloul 27'	Report	Iachheb 29'	Stadium: Ahmed Zabana Stadium; Referee: Rafik Aouina
Note: MC Oran Lineups: Soufi, Khadir, Ezzemani, Benamar, Khali, Fourloul, Benamara, Chadli, Belaribi (Abed Abbassi, 98'), Saihi, Benayad. (Bennai, '), (Benhamou, '), (Senhadji, ')

== Squad information ==
=== Playing statistics ===
No.	Pos	Nat	Player	Total		Ligue 1		Algerian Cup	
No.	Pos	Nat	Player	Apps	Goals	Apps	Goals	Apps	Goals
Goalkeepers
1	GK	(Algeria) ALG	Athmane Toual	1	0	1	0	0	0
16	GK	(Algeria) ALG	Kamel Soufi	28	0	27	0	1	0
20	GK	(Algeria) ALG	Bachir Della Krachai	2	0	2	0	0	0
Defenders
2	DF	(Algeria) ALG	Benali Benamar	22	1	21	1	1	0
3	DF	(Algeria) ALG	Sofiane Khadir	23	1	22	1	1	0
4	DF	(Algeria) ALG	Mohamed Naâmani	23	3	23	3	0	0
5	DF	(Algeria) ALG	Djamel Ibouzidène	13	0	13	0	0	0
11	DF	(Algeria) ALG	Abderrahmane Nehari	9	1	9	1	0	0
12	DF	(Algeria) ALG	Mohamed Amine Ezzemani	28	2	27	2	1	0
15	DF	(Algeria) ALG	Senoussi Fourloul	21	2	20	1	1	1
19	DF	(Algeria) ALG	Zakaria Khali	18	0	17	0	1	0
Midfielders
6	MF	(Algeria) ALG	Mohamed Lagraâ	22	0	22	0	0	0
7	MF	(Algeria) ALG	Hichem Talha	0	0	0	0	0	0
8	MF	(Algeria) ALG	Salim Bennai	19	0	18	0	1	0
10	MF	(Algeria) ALG	Amine Abed Abbassi	16	0	15	0	1	0
13	MF	(Algeria) ALG	Yasser Belaribi	27	3	26	3	1	0
18	MF	(Algeria) ALG	Mohamed Bengrina	18	0	18	0	0	0
23	MF	(Algeria) ALG	Abdelhafid Benamara	30	0	28	0	2	0
24	MF	(Algeria) ALG	Seddik Senhadji	3	0	2	0	1	0
25	MF	(Algeria) ALG	Imed Saihi	22	2	21	2	1	0
27	MF	(Algeria) ALG	Aymen Chadli	25	1	24	1	1	0
36	MF	(Algeria) ALG	Ilyes Cherif El Ouazani	1	0	1	0	0	0
45	MF	(Algeria) ALG	Mohamed Imed Reguig	2	0	2	0	0	0
Forwards
9	FW	(Algeria) ALG	Belkacem Yadaden	9	0	9	0	0	0
14	FW	(Algeria) ALG	Mourad Benayad	28	4	27	4	1	0
17	FW	(Algeria) ALG	Ameur Bouguettaya	17	1	17	1	0	0
21	FW	(Algeria) ALG	Hamza Belahouel	13	0	13	0	0	0
22	FW	(Algeria) ALG	Mahi Benhamou	16	2	15	2	1	0
26	FW	(Algeria) ALG	Merouane Dahar	17	2	17	2	0	0
31	FW	(Algeria) ALG	Abdellah Oukil	1	0	1	0	0	0
Players transferred out during the season

Last updated: 15 July 2023
Source: soccerway.com

=== Goalscorers ===
As of 15 July 2023

Includes all competitive matches. The list is sorted alphabetically by surname when total goals are equal.

No.	Nat.	Player	Pos.	L 1	AC	TOTAL
14	(Algeria)	Mourad Benayad	FW	4	0	4
4	(Algeria)	Mohamed Naâmani	DF	3	0	3
13	(Algeria)	Yasser Belaribi	MF	3	0	3
15	(Algeria)	Senoussi Fourloul	DF	1	1	2
12	(Algeria)	Mohamed Amine Ezzemani	DF	2	0	2
24	(Algeria)	Merouane Dahar	MF	2	0	2
22	(Algeria)	Mahi Benhamou	FW	2	0	2
25	(Algeria)	Imed Saihi	MF	2	0	2
23	(Algeria)	Abdelhafid Benamara	MF	2	0	2
3	(Algeria)	Sofiane Khadir	DF	1	0	1
2	(Algeria)	Benali Benamar	DF	1	0	1
27	(Algeria)	Aymen Chadli	MF	1	0	1
11	(Algeria)	Abderrahmane Nehari	DF	1	0	1
17	(Algeria)	Ameur Bouguettaya	FW	1	0	1
Own Goals				1	0	1
Totals				27	1	28
