= 2021–22 MC Oran season =

MC Oran
2021–22 season
- President: Tayeb Mehiaoui (until 8 February 2022); Youcef Djebbari (from 8 February 2022)
- Head coach: Azzedine Aït Djoudi (from 9 September 2021) (until 13 November 2021); Moez Bouakaz (from 28 November 2021) (until 9 February 2022); Abdelkader Amrani (from 9 February 2022)
- Stadium: Ahmed Zabana Stadium
- Ligue 1: 11th
- Top goalscorer: League: Yacine Guenina (8 goals); All: Yacine Guenina (8 goals)

In the 2021–22 season, MC Oran is competing in the Ligue 1 for the 56th season. It is their 13th consecutive season in the top flight of Algerian football. They competing in Ligue 1.

== Squad list ==
Players and squad numbers last updated on 20 October 2021.
Note: Flags indicate national team as has been defined under FIFA eligibility rules. Players may hold more than one non-FIFA nationality.

| No. | Nat. | Position | Name | Date of birth (age) | Signed from |
Goalkeepers
| 1 | (Algeria) | GK | Athmane Toual | 17 July 1984 (aged 37) | Unattached |
| 16 | (Algeria) | GK | Kamel Soufi | 5 June 1996 (aged 25) | (Algeria) WA Tlemcen |
| 20 | (Algeria) | GK | Bachir Della Krachai | 18 August 1996 (aged 25) | (Algeria) ASM Oran |
Defenders
| 2 | (Algeria) | CB | Benali Benamar | January 12, 1995 (aged 26) | (Algeria) Olympique de Médéa |
| 3 | (Algeria) | RB | Sofiane Khadir | 3 August 1994 (aged 27) | (Algeria) NA Hussein Dey |
| 4 | (Algeria) | CB | Mohamed Naâmani | September 21, 1990 (aged 31) | (Saudi Arabia) Al Fateh |
| 19 | (Algeria) | CB | Zakaria Khali | 10 May 1990 (aged 31) | (Algeria) CR Belouizdad |
| 21 | (Algeria) | LB | Zineddine Mekkaoui | January 10, 1987 (aged 34) | (Algeria) RC Relizane |
| 24 | (Algeria) | RB | Walid Alati | 1 August 1991 (aged 30) | (Algeria) MC Alger |
Midfielders
| 5 | (Algeria) | MF | Abdessamed Bounoua | 24 April 1991 (aged 30) | (Algeria) JS Kabylie |
| 6 | (Algeria) | MF | Mohamed Lagraâ | November 7, 1986 (aged 35) | (Algeria) USM Bel Abbès |
| 7 | (Algeria) | MF | Hichem Talha | August 14, 1999 (aged 22) | (Algeria) MC Saïda |
| 8 | (Algeria) | MF | Bassem Chaouti | May 21, 1991 (aged 30) | (Algeria) CA Bordj Bou Arréridj |
| 13 | (Algeria) | MF | Yasser Belaribi | 22 June 1999 (aged 22) | (Algeria) WA Tlemcen |
| 22 | (Algeria) | MF | Youcef Guertil | March 11, 1997 (aged 24) | (Algeria) Youth system |
| 23 | (Algeria) | MF | Abdelhafid Benamara | October 1, 1995 (aged 26) | (Algeria) USM El Harrach |
| 26 | (Algeria) | MF | Merouane Dahar | 25 December 1992 (aged 29) | (Algeria) AS Ain M'lila |
| 27 | (Algeria) | MF | Aymen Chadli | 3 September 1999 (aged 22) | (Algeria) RC Relizane |
Forwards
| 9 | (Algeria) | FW | Belkacem Yadaden | 25 January 1995 (aged 26) | (Algeria) HB Chelghoum Laïd |
| 10 | (Algeria) | FW | Adil Djabout | 31 December 1992 (aged 29) | (Algeria) AS Aïn M'lila |
| 11 | (Algeria) | FW | Mohamed El Amine Belmokhtar | 16 April 1995 (aged 26) | (Algeria) USM Bel Abbès |
| 14 | (Algeria) | FW | Yacine Guenina | February 15, 1995 (aged 26) | (Algeria) MO Béjaïa |
| 15 | (Algeria) | FW | Chérif Siam | May 1, 1995 (aged 26) | (Algeria) AS Aïn M'lila |
| 17 | (Algeria) | FW | Ameur Bouguettaya | 21 July 1995 (aged 25) | (Algeria) ASO Chlef |
| 18 | (Cameroon) | FW | Tony Abega | April 28, 1997 (aged 24) | Unattached |
| 25 | (Algeria) | FW | Adel Khettab | February 18, 1993 (aged 28) | (Algeria) WA Boufarik |

== Competitions ==
=== Overview ===
| Competition | Record | | | | | | | | Started round | Final position / round | First match | Last match |
| Competition | G | W | D | L | GF | GA | GD | Win % | Started round | Final position / round | First match | Last match |
|---|---|---|---|---|---|---|---|---|---|---|---|---|
| Ligue 1 | 34 | 10 | 16 | 8 | 32 | 29 | +3 | 29.41 | —N/a | 11th | 22 October 2021 | 10 June 2022 |
| Total | 34 | 10 | 16 | 8 | 32 | 29 | +3 | 29.41 | | | | |

Updated to match played 10 June 2022
Source: Competitions

== League table ==
| Pos | Team | Pld | W | D | L | GF | GA | GD | Pts |
|---|---|---|---|---|---|---|---|---|---|
| 9 | ASO Chlef | 34 | 13 | 11 | 10 | 38 | 31 | +7 | 50 (Note: ASO Chlef finished ahead of US Biskra on head-to-head goal difference: US Biskra 2–1 ASO Chlef, ASO Chlef 2–0 US Biskra.) |
| 10 | US Biskra | 34 | 13 | 11 | 10 | 36 | 32 | +4 | 50 |
| 11 | MC Oran | 34 | 10 | 16 | 8 | 32 | 29 | +3 | 46 |
| 12 | HB Chelghoum Laïd | 34 | 11 | 12 | 11 | 40 | 41 | −1 | 45 |
| 13 | NC Magra | 34 | 13 | 6 | 15 | 31 | 36 | −5 | 45 |

Updated to match(es) played on 17 June 2022. Source: the-sports.org
Rules for classification: 1) points; 2) head-to-head points; 3) head-to-head goal difference; 4) goal difference; 5) total goals; 6) fairplay ranking; 7) playoff.

=== Results summary ===
| Overall | | | | | | | | Home | | | | | | Away | | | | | |
| Pld | W | D | L | GF | GA | GD | Pts | W | D | L | GF | GA | GD | W | D | L | GF | GA | GD |
|---|---|---|---|---|---|---|---|---|---|---|---|---|---|---|---|---|---|---|---|
| 34 | 10 | 16 | 8 | 32 | 29 | +3 | 46 | 7 | 8 | 2 | 23 | 15 | +8 | 3 | 8 | 6 | 9 | 14 | −5 |

Last updated: 10 June 2022.
Source: Competitive matches

=== Results by round ===
| Round | 1 | 2 | 3 | 4 | 5 | 6 | 7 | 8 | 9 | 10 | 11 | 12 | 13 | 14 | 15 | 16 | 17 | 18 | 19 | 20 | 21 | 22 | 23 | 24 | 25 | 26 | 27 | 28 | 29 | 30 | 31 | 32 | 33 | 34 |
|---|---|---|---|---|---|---|---|---|---|---|---|---|---|---|---|---|---|---|---|---|---|---|---|---|---|---|---|---|---|---|---|---|---|---|
| Ground | A | H | A | H | A | H | A | H | A | H | A | H | H | A | H | A | H | H | A | H | A | H | A | H | A | H | A | H | A | A | H | A | H | A |
| Result | W | L | L | D | L | D | L | D | D | D | L | W | D | L | W | L | W | W | D | L | W | D | D | W | D | W | D | D | D | W | D | D | W | D |
| Position | 5 | 10 | 12 | 12 | 12 | 12 | 13 | 14 | 15 | 15 | 15 | 13 | 14 | 16 | 11 | 13 | 13 | 12 | 12 | 13 | 12 | 11 | 12 | 12 | 12 | 11 | 11 | 12 | 11 | 11 | 11 | 11 | 11 | 11 |

Updated to match(es) played on 11 June 2022. Source: Competitive matches
A = Away; H = Home; W = Win; D = Draw; L = Loss

=== Matches ===
The league fixtures were announced on 7 October 2021.

| 22 October 2021 Round 1 | CS Constantine | 0–1 | MC Oran | Constantine |
| 15:30 | | Report | Yadaden 57' | Stadium: Stade Ramdane Benabdelmalek; Attendance: 0 (Note: The match was played behind closed doors due to the COVID-19 pandemic in Algeria.); Referee: Hamza Bouslimani |

| 30 October 2021 Round 2 | MC Oran | 2–4 | Paradou AC | Oran |
| 15:00 | Chadli 66'; Djabout 90+2' | Report | Benbouali 37', 73'; Bouzok 51' (pen.), 56' | Stadium: Ahmed Zabana Stadium; Referee: Houssam Benyahia |

| 7 November 2021 Round 3 | Olympique de Médéa | 1–0 | MC Oran | Médéa |
| 15:00 | Nehari 45' | Report | | Stadium: Stade Imam Lyes; Referee: Akram Mechairia |

| 19 November 2021 Round 4 | MC Oran | 0–0 | ES Sétif | Oran |
| 17:00 | | Report | | Stadium: Ahmed Zabana Stadium; Referee: Lyés Bekouassa |

| 25 November 2021 Round 5 | NA Hussein Dey | 2–1 | MC Oran | Belouizdad |
| 14:30 | Nadji 27', 47' | Report | Guenina 39' (pen.) | Stadium: Stade 20 Août 1955; Referee: Said Aouina |

| 4 December 2021 Round 6 | MC Oran | 1–1 | RC Arbaâ | Oran |
| 17:00 | Djabout 83' | Report | Kismoun 79' | Stadium: Ahmed Zabana Stadium; Referee: Abdelali Ibrir |

| 10 December 2021 Round 7 | JS Saoura | 2–0 | MC Oran | Béchar |
| 17:00 | Lahmeri 55'; Bellatreche 87' | Report | | Stadium: Stade 20 Août 1955; Referee: Lotfi Bekouassa |

| 17 December 2021 Round 8 | MC Oran | 2–2 | US Biskra | Oran |
| 16:00 | Dahar 66'; Alati 69' | Report | M.Khoualed 61'; Ounnas 90+3' | Stadium: Ahmed Zabana Stadium; Referee: Mohamed Amine Benzohra |

| 24 December 2021 Round 9 | USM Alger | 0–0 | MC Oran | Bologhine |
| 18:00 | Baouche (yellow card) 21'; Belaïd (yellow card) 42'; Bouchina (red card) 45+1' | Report | Belmokhtar (yellow card) 55'; Khettab (red card) 64'; Khadir (yellow card) 90+2' | Stadium: Omar Hamadi Stadium; Attendance: 0 (close doors); Referee: Mehdi Abid Charef |

| 28 December 2021 Round 10 | MC Oran | 2–2 | HB Chelghoum Laïd | Oran |
| 18:00 | Ameur Bouguettaya 39'; Tarek Cheurfaoui 84' (o.g.) | Report | Mohamed Belaribi 70'; Ahmed Khaldi 73' (pen.) | Stadium: Ahmed Zabana Stadium; Referee: Lyés Bekouassa |

| 2 January 2022 Round 11 | JS Kabylie | 1–0 | MC Oran | Tizi Ouzou |
| 15:00 | Harrag 30' (pen.) | Report | | Stadium: Stade 1er Novembre 1954; Attendance: 0 (close doors); Referee: Abderrezzak Arab |

| 7 January 2022 Round 12 | MC Oran | 1–0 | ASO Chlef | Oran |
| 18:00 | Guenina 56' (pen.) | Report | | Stadium: Ahmed Zabana Stadium; Referee: Hamza Bouslimani |

| 14 January 2022 Round 13 | MC Oran | 1–1 | RC Relizane | Oran |
| 17:00 | Yacine Guenina 23' | Report | Abou Sofiane Balegh 33' | Stadium: Ahmed Zabana Stadium; Referee: Houssam Benyahia |

| 21 January 2022 Round 14 | CR Belouizdad | 3–0 | MC Oran | Belouizdad |
| 15:00 | Bourdim 30'; Dadache 71'; Khalfallah 88' | Report | | Stadium: Stade 20 Août 1955; Attendance: 0 (close doors); Referee: Said Aouina |

| 25 January 2022 Round 15 | MC Oran | 2–1 | NC Magra | Oran |
| 14:30 | Guenina 14' (pen.); Belaribi 87' | Report | Baghdaoui 53' | Stadium: Ahmed Zabana Stadium; Referee: Lyés Bekouassa |

| 29 January 2022 Round 16 | WA Tlemcen | 1–0 | MC Oran | Tlemcen |
| 14:30 | Abderrazak Benamraoui 60' | Report | | Stadium: Colonel Lotfi Stadium; Referee: Abdelmoumen Touabti |

| 5 February 2022 Round 17 | MC Oran | 1–0 | MC Alger | Oran |
| 17:00 | Djabout 79' (pen.) | Report | | Stadium: Ahmed Zabana Stadium; Referee: Abderrezzak Arab |

| 25 February 2022 Round 18 | MC Oran | 2–1 | CS Constantine | Oran |
| 15:00 | Belmokhtar 2'; Djabout 10' (pen.) | Report | Koukpo 52' | Stadium: Ahmed Zabana Stadium; Referee: Lotfi Bekouassa |

| 1 March 2022 Round 19 | Paradou AC | 0–0 | MC Oran | Dar El Beïda |
| 14:30 | | Report | | Stadium: Omar Benrabah Stadium; Attendance: 0 (close doors); Referee: Abdelali Ibrir |

| 5 March 2022 Round 20 | MC Oran | 0–1 | Olympique de Médéa | Oran |
| 13:30 | | Report | Gagaa 21' (pen.) | Stadium: Ahmed Zabana Stadium; Referee: Hamza Boucetta |

| 9 April 2022 Round 21 | ES Sétif | 0–1 | MC Oran | Sétif |
| 23:00 | | Report | Djabout 74' | Stadium: Stade 8 Mai 1945; Attendance: 0 (close doors); Referee: Hamza Bouslimani |

| 18 March 2022 Round 22 | MC Oran | 0–0 | NA Hussein Dey | Oran |
| 14:00 | | Report | | Stadium: Ahmed Zabana Stadium; Referee: Abderrezzak Arab |

| 26 March 2022 Round 23 | RC Arbaâ | 1–1 | MC Oran | Larbaâ |
| 14:00 | Boubakour 52' | Report | Djabout 30' (pen.) | Stadium: Ismaïl Makhlouf Stadium; Referee: Nadjib Meziani |

| 1 June 2022 Round 24 | MC Oran | 2–1 | JS Saoura | Oran |
| 17:45 | Chaouti 11'; Siam 19' | Report | Saâd 29' | Stadium: Ahmed Zabana Stadium; Referee: Amine Hansal |

| 13 April 2022 Round 25 | US Biskra | 2–2 | MC Oran | Biskra |
| 22:00 | Lakhdari 29'; Khoualed 90+4' | Report | Guenina 53'; Benamar 90+6' | Stadium: Stade du 18 Février; Referee: Amine Sekhraoui |

| 17 April 2022 Round 26 | MC Oran | 2–1 | USM Alger | Oran |
| 22:30 | Djabout 20'; Chadli 77' (yellow card) 77' | Report | Othmani 49' (yellow card) 49' | Stadium: Ahmed Zabana Stadium; Referee: Abdelali Ibrir |

| 23 April 2022 Round 27 | HB Chelghoum Laïd | 0–0 | MC Oran | Chelghoum Laïd |
| 15:45 | | Report | | Stadium: 11 December 1961 Stadium; Referee: Lotfi Bekouassa |

| 29 April 2022 Round 28 | MC Oran | 0–0 | JS Kabylie | Oran |
| 23:30 | | Report | | Stadium: Ahmed Zabana Stadium; Referee: Youcef Gamouh |

| 7 May 2022 Round 29 | ASO Chlef | 1–1 | MC Oran | Chlef |
| 16:00 | Souibaâh 8' | Report | Dahar 82' (pen.) | Stadium: Stade Mohamed Boumezrag; Referee: Lyés Bekouassa |

| 14 May 2022 Round 30 | RC Relizane | 0–2 | MC Oran | Relizane |
| 17:00 | Guenina 15' (pen.), 16' | Report | | Stadium: Stade Tahar Zoughari; Referee: Fodil Oukil |

| 22 May 2022 Round 31 | MC Oran | 0–0 | CR Belouizdad | Oran |
| 17:00 | | Report | | Stadium: Ahmed Zabana Stadium; Referee: Mehdi Abid Charef |

| 27 May 2022 Round 32 | NC Magra | 0–0 | MC Oran | Magra |
| 16:45 | | Report | | Stadium: Boucheligue Brothers Stadium; Referee: Hamza Bouslimani |

| 5 June 2022 Round 33 | MC Oran | 5–0 | WA Tlemcen | Oran |
| 20:00 | Siam 4'; Guenina 12' (pen.); Belaribi 24'; Dahar 70', 83' | Report | | Stadium: Ahmed Zabana Stadium; Referee: Hadj Aissa Semache |

| 10 June 2022 Round 34 | MC Alger | 0–0 | MC Oran | Algiers |
| 17:45 | | Report | | Stadium: Stade du 5 Juillet; Referee: Mohamed Tahar Milia |

== Squad information ==
=== Playing statistics ===
| No. | Pos | Nat | Player | Total | | Ligue 1 | |
| No. | Pos | Nat | Player | Apps | Goals | Apps | Goals |
Goalkeepers
| 1 | GK | (Algeria) ALG | Athmane Toual | 0 | 0 | 0 | 0 |
| 16 | GK | (Algeria) ALG | Kamel Soufi | 32 | 0 | 32 | 0 |
| 20 | GK | (Algeria) ALG | Bachir Della Krachai | 2 | 0 | 2 | 0 |
Defenders
| 2 | DF | (Algeria) ALG | Benali Benamar | 27 | 1 | 27 | 1 |
| 3 | DF | (Algeria) ALG | Sofiane Khadir | 27 | 0 | 27 | 0 |
| 4 | DF | (Algeria) ALG | Mohamed Naâmani | 19 | 0 | 19 | 0 |
| 19 | DF | (Algeria) ALG | Zakaria Khali | 29 | 0 | 29 | 0 |
| 21 | DF | (Algeria) ALG | Zineddine Mekkaoui | 28 | 0 | 28 | 0 |
| 24 | DF | (Algeria) ALG | Walid Alati | 23 | 1 | 23 | 1 |
| 65 | DF | (Algeria) ALG | Abdelkader Tamimi | 8 | 0 | 8 | 0 |
Midfielders
| 5 | MF | (Algeria) ALG | Abdessamed Bounoua | 32 | 0 | 32 | 0 |
| 6 | MF | (Algeria) ALG | Mohamed Lagraâ | 28 | 0 | 28 | 0 |
| 7 | MF | (Algeria) ALG | Hichem Talha | 0 | 0 | 0 | 0 |
| 8 | MF | (Algeria) ALG | Bassem Chaouti | 31 | 1 | 31 | 1 |
| 13 | MF | (Algeria) ALG | Yasser Belaribi | 15 | 2 | 15 | 2 |
| 22 | MF | (Algeria) ALG | Youcef Guertil | 16 | 0 | 16 | 0 |
| 23 | MF | (Algeria) ALG | Abdelhafid Benamara | 26 | 0 | 26 | 0 |
| 26 | MF | (Algeria) ALG | Merouane Dahar | 18 | 4 | 18 | 4 |
| 27 | MF | (Algeria) ALG | Aymen Chadli | 29 | 2 | 29 | 2 |
Forwards
| 9 | FW | (Algeria) ALG | Belkacem Yadaden | 18 | 1 | 18 | 1 |
| 10 | FW | (Algeria) ALG | Adil Djabout | 22 | 7 | 22 | 7 |
| 11 | FW | (Algeria) ALG | Mohamed El Amine Belmokhtar | 13 | 1 | 13 | 1 |
| 13 | FW | (Algeria) ALG | Mohamed Amine Semahi | 0 | 0 | 0 | 0 |
| 14 | FW | (Algeria) ALG | Yacine Guenina | 32 | 8 | 32 | 8 |
| 15 | FW | (Algeria) ALG | Chérif Siam | 21 | 2 | 21 | 2 |
| 17 | FW | (Algeria) ALG | Ameur Bouguettaya | 17 | 1 | 17 | 1 |
| 18 | FW | (Cameroon) CMR | Tony Abega | 2 | 0 | 2 | 0 |
| 25 | FW | (Algeria) ALG | Adel Khettab | 7 | 0 | 7 | 0 |
Players transferred out during the season

Last updated: 10 June 2022
Source: fr.soccerway.com

=== Goalscorers ===
Includes all competitive matches. The list is sorted alphabetically by surname when total goals are equal.

| No. | Nat. | Player | Pos. | L 1 | TOTAL |
|---|---|---|---|---|---|
| 14 | (Algeria) | Yacine Guenina | FW | 8 | 8 |
| 10 | (Algeria) | Adil Djabout | FW | 7 | 7 |
| 26 | (Algeria) | Merouane Dahar | MF | 4 | 4 |
| 15 | (Algeria) | Chérif Siam | FW | 2 | 2 |
| | (Algeria) | Yasser Belaribi | FW | 2 | 2 |
| 27 | (Algeria) | Aymen Chadli | MF | 2 | 2 |
| 9 | (Algeria) | Belkacem Yadaden | FW | 1 | 1 |
| 11 | (Algeria) | Mohamed El Amine Belmokhtar | FW | 1 | 1 |
| 17 | (Algeria) | Ameur Bouguettaya | FW | 1 | 1 |
| 8 | (Algeria) | Bassem Chaouti | MF | 1 | 1 |
| 2 | (Algeria) | Benali Benamar | DF | 1 | 1 |
| 24 | (Algeria) | Walid Alati | DF | 1 | 1 |
| Own Goals | | | | 0 | 0 |
| Totals | | | | 32 | 32 |

== Transfers ==
=== In ===
| Date | Pos | Player | From club | Transfer fee | Source |
|---|---|---|---|---|---|
| 16 September 2021 | RB | (Algeria) Walid Alati | MC Alger | Free transfer | |
| 21 September 2021 | GK | (Algeria) Kamel Soufi | WA Tlemcen | Free transfer | |
| 21 September 2021 | GK | (Algeria) Bachir Della Krachai | ASM Oran | Free transfer | |
| 21 September 2021 | GK | (Algeria) Karam Hamdad | JS Kabylie | Free transfer | |
| 21 September 2021 | CB | (Algeria) Zakaria Khali | CR Belouizdad | Free transfer | |
| 21 September 2021 | RB | (Algeria) Sofiane Khadir | USM Bel Abbès | Free transfer | |
| 21 September 2021 | LB | (Algeria) Ilyes Berrached | SKAF Khemis Miliana | Free transfer | |
| 21 September 2021 | MF | (Algeria) Aymen Chadli | RC Relizane | Free transfer | |
| 21 September 2021 | MF | (Algeria) Hichem Talha | MC Saïda | Free transfer | |
| 21 September 2021 | MF | (Algeria) Merouane Dahar | AS Aïn M'lila | Free transfer | |
| 21 September 2021 | FW | (Algeria) Mohamed El Amine Belmokhtar | USM Bel Abbès | Free transfer | |
| 21 September 2021 | FW | (Algeria) Belkacem Yadaden | HB Chelghoum Laïd | Free transfer | |
| 21 September 2021 | FW | (Algeria) Adil Djabout | AS Aïn M'lila | Free transfer | |
| 21 September 2021 | FW | (Algeria) Yasser Belaribi | WA Tlemcen | Free transfer | |
| 18 October 2021 | FW | (Algeria) Ameur Bouguettaya | ASO Chlef | Free transfer | |

=== Out ===
| Date | Pos | Player | To club | Transfer fee | Source |
|---|---|---|---|---|---|
| 11 August 2021 | CB | (Algeria) Boualem Mesmoudi | (Tunisia) Étoile du Sahel | Free transfer | |
| 2 September 2021 | GK | (Algeria) Oussama Litim | (Saudi Arabia) Al-Ain FC | Free transfer | |
| 2 September 2021 | MF | (Algeria) Abdelkader Boutiche | ES Sétif | Free transfer | |
| 2 September 2021 | FW | (Algeria) Zoubir Motrani | ES Sétif | Free transfer | |
| 3 September 2021 | RW | (Algeria) Benamar Mellal | JS Saoura | Free transfer | |
| 5 September 2021 | LW | (Algeria) Mahi Benhamou | CR Belouizdad | Free transfer | |
| 5 September 2021 | RB | (Algeria) Kamel Hamidi | MC Alger | Free transfer | |
| 7 September 2021 | CB | (Algeria) Hicham Belkaroui | ES Sétif | Free transfer | |
| 13 September 2021 | LB | (Algeria) Mohamed Amine Ezzemani | MC Alger | Free transfer | |
| 15 September 2021 | FW | (Algeria) Hichem Nekkache | (Tunisia) CS Sfaxien | Free transfer | |
| 20 September 2021 | MF | (Algeria) Bachir Belloumi | GC Mascara | Free transfer | |
