= Kamel Soufi =

Algerian footballer (born 1996)

Personal information
- Date of birth: 5 March 1996 (age 30)
- Place of birth: Sidi Bel Abbès, Algeria
- Height: 1.85 m (6 ft 1 in)
- Position: Goalkeeper

Team information
- Current team: MC Oran
- Number: 16

Youth career
- –: USM Bel Abbès
- –2016: CR Belouizdad

Senior career*
Years	Team	Apps	(Gls)
2016–2018	CR Belouizdad	2	(0)
2018–2021	WA Tlemcen	50	(0)
2021–2023	MC Oran	59	(0)
2023–2026	USM Alger	33	(0)
2026–	MC Oran	0	(0)
- * Club domestic league appearances and goals as of 13 July 2026

Kamel Soufi (Arabic: كمال سوفي; born 5 March 1996) is an Algerian professional footballer who plays as a goalkeeper for MC Oran in the Algerian Ligue Professionnelle 1.

== Career ==
In 2021, Soufi signed a contract with MC Oran.

On 1 August 2023, Soufi joined USM Alger. His first title came with the opening of the season by winning the CAF Super Cup against Al Ahly. On 14 October 2023, Soufi participated in his first match in Ligue 1 against USM Khenchela, which led him to victory and the first clean sheet for him.

On 13 July 2026, he returned to MC Oran.

== Career statistics ==
As of 6 June 2026

Club	Season	League			Cup		Continental		Other		Total	
Club	Season	Division	Apps	Goals	Apps	Goals	Apps	Goals	Apps	Goals	Apps	Goals
MC Oran	2021–22	Ligue 1	32	0	—		—		—		32	0
MC Oran	2022–23	Ligue 1	27	0	1	0	—		—		28	0
Total			59	0	1	0	—		—		60	0
USM Alger	2023–24	Ligue 1	15	0	3	0	0 (Note: All appearance(s) in CAF Confederation Cup)	0	—		18	0
USM Alger	2024–25	Ligue 1	5	0	1	0	1	0	—		7	0
USM Alger	2025–26	Ligue 1	13	0	2	0	1	0	0 (Note: All appearances in Algerian Super Cup)	0	16	0
Total			33	0	6	0	2	0	—		41	0
Career total			79	0	4	0	0	0	—		83	0

== Honours ==
USM Alger

- Algerian Cup: 2024–25, 2025–26
- CAF Super Cup: 2023
- CAF Confederation Cup: 2025–26
