= List of MC Oran seasons =

Mouloudia Club of Oran (MC Oran) is a football club based in Oran. The club was founded in 1917 by some of Algerian nationalists which decided to create à Muslim club to compete with the European clubs of the moments when Algeria was a French district (French Algeria).

This page is a season-by-season record of club's league and cup performance in national and international competitions.

== Before independence ==
Below, the MC Oran season-by-season record before independence in the French Algeria period :

(France) FFF - season-by-season record of Mouloudia Club of Oran
Season	League of Oran											Oran Cup	Coupe de France	North African Championship	North African Cup
Season	Division	Pos.	Pts	P	W	D	L	F	A	GD	Goalscorer	Oran Cup	Coupe de France	North African Championship	North African Cup
Mouloudia Club Musulman Oranais (MCMO)
1916-17	Do not enter (Note: The MCMO does not take part in the Oran regional 1st division championship (Regional Championship), the equivalent of the French 3rd division because the championship began before the club was founded on 1 January 1917. But the club takes part in the Oran Cup which began in 1917.)	-	-	-	-	-	-	-	-	-	-	-	-	-	-
1917-18	DD (Note: The MCMO start in the 5th regional division of Oran (District Division), corresponding to the 8th French division.)	-	-	-	-	-	-	-	-	-	-	-	-	-	-
1918-19	DD	4th	-	-	-	-	-	-	-	-	-	R1 (Note: Coupe de la Marine.)	-	-	-
1918-19	DD	4th	-	-	-	-	-	-	-	-	-	SF (Note: Coupe Turman.)	-	-	-
1919-20	DD	-	-	-	-	-	-	-	-	-	-	-	-	-	-
1920-21	DD	-	-	-	-	-	-	-	-	-	-	-	-	-	-
1921-22	DD	-	-	-	-	-	-	-	-	-	-	R2	-	-	-
1922-23	DD	-	-	-	-	-	-	-	-	-	-	-	-	-	-
1923-24	DD	-	-	-	-	-	-	-	-	-	-	-	-	-	-
Mouloudia Hamidia Club Musulman Oranais (MHCMO)
1924-25	DD	-	-	-	-	-	-	-	-	-	-	-	-	-	-
1925-26	DD	-	-	-	-	-	-	-	-	-	-	-	-	-	-
1926-27	DD	-	-	-	-	-	-	-	-	-	-	-	-	-	-
1927-28	DD	-	-	-	-	-	-	-	-	-	-	-	-	-	-
1928-29	DD	-	-	-	-	-	-	-	-	-	-	-	-	-	-
1929-30	DD	-	-	-	-	-	-	-	-	-	-	-	-	-	-
1930-31	DD	-	-	-	-	-	-	-	-	-	-	-	-	-	-
Mouloudia Club Oranais (MCO)
1931-32	DD	-	-	-	-	-	-	-	-	-	-	-	-	-	-
1932-33	DD	-	-	-	-	-	-	-	-	-	-	-	-	-	-
1933-34	DD	-	-	-	-	-	-	-	-	-	-	-	-	-	-
1934-35	DD	-	-	-	-	-	-	-	-	-	-	-	-	-	-
1935-36	DD	-	-	-	-	-	-	-	-	-	-	-	-	-	-
1936-37	DD	-	-	-	-	-	-	-	-	-	-	-	-	-	-
1937-38	DD	-	-	-	-	-	-	-	-	-	-	-	-	-	-
1938-39	DD	-	-	-	-	-	-	-	-	-	-	-	-	-	-
From 1939 to 1945, the MCM Oran suspended all its sporting and cultural activities for the reasons of the Second World War.
Season	League of Oran											Oran Cup	Coupe de France	North African Championship	North African Cup
Season	Division	Pos.	Pts	P	W	D	L	F	A	GD	Goalscorer	Oran Cup	Coupe de France	North African Championship	North African Cup
Mouloudia Club Oranais (MCO)
1946-47	DD (Note: The MCO start in the 5th regional division of Oran (District Division), corresponding to the 8th French division.)	-	-	-	-	-	-	-	-	-	-	-	-	-	-
1947-48	DD	-	-	-	-	-	-	-	-	-	-	-	-	-	-
1948-49	DD	-	-	-	-	-	-	-	-	-	-	-	-	-	PR
1949-50	P D1 (Note: The MCO start in the 4th regional division of Oran (Promotion of 1st Division), corresponding to the 7th French division.)	-	-	-	-	-	-	-	-	-	-	-	-	-	-
1950-51	D1 (Note: The MCO start in the 3rd regional division of Oran (1st Division), corresponding to the 6th French division.)	-	-	-	-	-	-	-	-	-	-	-	-	-	-
1951-52	D1	-	-	-	-	-	-	-	-	-	-	-	-	-	2RR
1952-53	D1	-	-	-	-	-	-	-	-	-	-	-	-	-	4RR
1953-54	P DH (Note: The MCO start in the 2nd regional division of Oran (Promotion of Honnor Division), corresponding to the 5th French division.)	-	-	-	-	-	-	-	-	-	-	-	-	-	1RR
1954-55	P DH	6th	33	18	5	6	7	26	34	-8	-	-	-	-	4RR
1955-56	P DH	8th	32	18	5	4	9	26	25	+1	-	-	-	-	4RR
No competition is played by the muslim clubs between 1956 and 1962 by order of the FLN (Algerian War).

== After independence ==
Below, the MC Oran season-by-season record after independence of Algeria :

(Algeria) FAF - season-by-season record of Mouloudia Club of Oran
Season	Championship											Cup	League Cup	Super Cup	International Comp.	
Season	Division	Pos.	Pts	P	W	D	L	F	A	GD	Goalscorer	Cup	League Cup	Super Cup	International Comp.	
Mouloudia Club Oranais (MCO)
1962-63	D1-CH West (Note: The 1st Championship of the independent Algeria D1 takes place in a tournament final left into three groups (Algiers, Oran and Constantine) the first of each group plus the second of group Algiers qualify in the semifinals. MCO finished sixth of the group of Oran.)	6th	10	6	2	0	4	9	13	-4	-	QF	-	-	-	-
1963-64	D1-DH West (Note: The 2nd Algerian Championship D1 is played with the same system as the first Championship. MCO finished second of the group.)	2nd	75	30	19	7	4	68	31	+37	-	R16	-	-	-	-
1964-65	D1	6th	62	30	12	7	11	38	31	+7	-	R64	-	-	-	-
1965-66	D1	5th	62	30	13	6	11	42	36	+6	-	SF	-	-	-	-
1966-67	D1	6th	46	22	8	8	6	24	23	+1	-	R16	-	-	-	-
1967-68	D1	2nd	49	22	10	7	5	28	21	+7	(Algeria) Fréha (15 goals)	R16	-	-	-	-
1968-69	D1	2nd	50	22	12	4	6	35	16	+19	(Algeria) Fréha (15 goals)	SF	-	-	-	-
1969-70	D1	7th	42	22	8	4	10	25	31	-6	-	R16	-	-	-	-
1970-71	D1	Champion	67	22	12	13	5	36	29	+7	(Algeria) Fréha (15 goals) (Algeria) Hamel (15 goals)	R16	-	-	-	-
Mouloudia Chaâbia Ouahrania (MCO)
1971-72	D1	4th	52	30	12	6	4	38	26	+12	-	R16	-	-	Maghreb C.Champions	4th
1972-73	D1	9th	59	30	11	8	11	48	40	+8	-	R16	-	-	-	-
1973-74	D1	8th	61	30	11	9	10	50	51	-1	-	QF	-	-	-	-
1974-75	D1	3rd	67	30	14	9	7	53	42	+11	(Algeria) Belkedrouci (18 goals)	Winner	-	-	-	-
1975-76	D1	9th	61	30	12	7	11	57	50	+7	-	R32	-	-	Maghreb C.Winners	QF
1976-77	D1	4th	62	26	13	10	3	53	36	+17	-	R32	-	-	-	-
Mouloudia Petroliers d'Oran (MPO)
1977-78	D1	8th	52	26	8	10	8	32	27	+5	-	SF	-	-	-	-
1978-79	D1	3rd	58	26	12	8	6	28	15	+13	(Algeria) Belloumi (11 goals)	SF	-	-	-	-
1979-80	D1	6th	63	28	10	11	7	28	27	+1	-	R16	-	-	-	-
1980-81	D1	9th	56	28	9	10	11	34	37	-3	-	SF	-	-	-	-
1981-82	D1	5th	62	30	11	10	9	39	26	+13	-	R16	-	-	-	-
1982-83	D1	5th	59	30	9	12	9	29	26	+3	-	QF	-	-	-	-
1983-84	D1	10th	58	30	9	10	11	24	24	0	-	Winner (2)	-	-	-	-
1984-85	D1	2nd	82	38	17	10	11	38	35	+3	-	Winner (3)	-	-	CAF C.Winners	2R
1985-86	D1	5th	77	38	14	11	13	40	31	+9	-	SF	-	-	CAF C.Winners	2R
1986-87	D1	2nd	42	38	16	10	12	44	32	+12	-	R64	-	-	-	-
Mouloudia d'Oran (MO)
1987-88	D1	Champion (2)	41	34	16	9	9	44	28	+16	-	SF	-	-	UAFA C.Champions	Qualif. R
1988-89	D1	7th	29	30	11	7	12	35	31	+4	-	SF	-	-	CAF C.Champions	Runner-up
Mouloudia Club d'Oran (MCO)
1989-90	D1	2nd	36	30	14	8	8	46	27	+19	-	Not played	-	-	-	-
1990-91	D1	10th	29	30	10	9	11	40	40	0	-	SF	-	-	-	
1991-92	D1	Champion (3)	39	30	16	7	7	55	33	+22	(Algeria) Tasfaout (17 goals)	QF	QF (Note: It's the 1st edition of this league cup but it was stopped in semi-finals.)	Runner-up	-	-
1992-93	D1	Champion (4)	38	30	15	8	7	43	27	+16	(Algeria) Tasfaout (15 goals)	Not played	-	-	CAF C.Champions	QF
1993-94	D1	9th	30	30	10	10	10	24	29	-5	-	SF	-	-	CAF C.Champions	SF
1994-95	D1	2nd	35	30	13	9	8	42	28	+14	-	R64	-	-	-	-
1995-96	D1	2nd	58	30	17	7	6	39	24	+15	-	Winner (4)	Winner	-	CAF Cup	QF
1996-97	D1	2nd	55	30	17	4	9	49	26	+23	-	R64	-	-	UAFA C.Winners	Winner
1996-97	D1	2nd	55	30	17	4	9	49	26	+23	-	R64	-	-	CAF C.Winners	QF
1997-98	D1-Gr.A (Note: The 1997-1998 championship season was played into 2 groups A and B, the winner of each group qualify to the final. Le MCO finished 4th of group A.)	4th	18	14	5	3	6	20	19	+1	-	Runner-up	R32	-	UAFA C.Winners	Winner (2)
1997-98	D1-Gr.A	4th	18	14	5	3	6	20	19	+1	-	Runner-up	R32	-	UAFA Supercoupe	4th
1997-98	D1-Gr.A	4th	18	14	5	3	6	20	19	+1	-	Runner-up	R32	-	CAF Cup	1R
1998-99	D1-Gr.B (Note: The 1998-1999 championship season was played into 2 groups A (Centre-east) and B (Centre-west), the winner of each group qualify to the final. Le MCO finished 5th of group B.)	5th	43	26	12	7	7	44	25	+19	-	R64	-	-	UAFA C.Winners	GS
1998-99	D1-Gr.B	5th	43	26	12	7	7	44	25	+19	-	R64	-	-	UAFA Supercoupe	Winner
1999-00	D1	2nd	38	22	14	5	3	41	21	+20	-	SF	Runner-up	-	-	-
2000-01	D1	8th	41	30	12	5	13	30	33	-3	-	R64	-	-	UAFA C.Champions	Runner-up
2001-02	D1	5th	45	30	13	6	11	31	28	+3	-	Runner-up	-	-	-	-
2002-03	D1	6th	43	30	11	10	9	41	40	+1	-	SF	-	-	-	-
2003-04	D1	6th	43	30	12	8	10	34	33	+1	-	SF	-	-	UAFA Champ.L.	1R
2004-05	D1	9th	39	30	10	9	11	36	37	-1	-	QF	-	-	CAF Conf.C.	2R
2005-06	D1	12th	37	30	10	7	13	35	42	-7	-	R64	-	-	-	-
2006-07	D1	6th	42	30	12	6	12	28	25	+3	-	QF	-	-	-	-
2007-08	D1	14th	37	30	10	7	13	28	34	-6	-	QF	-	-	UAFA Champ.L.	1R
Mouloudia Club Oranais (MCO)
2008-09	D2	2nd	60	32	17	9	6	33	18	+15	-	R16	-	-	-	-
2009-10	D1	15th	41	34	10	11	13	33	42	-9	-	R64	-	-	-	-
2010-11	L1	7th	41	30	11	8	11	26	27	-1	-	SF	-	-	-	-
2011-12	L1	13th	35	30	9	8	13	38	51	-13	-	R64	-	-	-	-
2012-13	L1	13th	32	28	8	8	12	29	37	-8	-	SF	-	-	-	-
2013-14	L1	12th	35	30	9	8	13	33	40	-13	-	QF	-	-	-	-
2014-15	L1	3rd	44	30	11	11	8	19	19	0	-	R16	-	-	-	-
2015-16	L1	10th	40	30	9	13	8	40	35	+5	(Libya) Zubya (13 goals)	R64	-	-	CAF Conf.C	2R
2016-17	L1	7th	40	30	9	13	8	24	25	-1	-	R32	-	-	-	-
2017-18	L1	4th	45	30	12	9	9	40	36	+4	-	R16	-	-	-	-
2018-19	L1	10th	36	30	8	12	10	33	38	-5	-	QF	-	-	-	-
2019-20	L1 (Note: The 2019–20 season is marked by the end of the championship on March 15, 2020 on the 22nd day following the spread of the Covid-19 pandemic in Algeria.)	8th	30	22	7	9	6	28	24	+4	-	R16	-	-	-	-
2020-21	L1	6th	60	38	15	15	8	51	37	+14	-	Not played	QF	-	-	-
2021-22	L1	11th	46	34	10	16	8	32	29	+3	-	Not played	-	-	-	-
2022-23	L1	10th	41	30	11	8	11	27	34	-7	-	R64	-	-	-	-
2023-24	L1	12th	36	30	9	9	12	26	33	-7	-	R16	-	-	-	-
2024-25	L1	8th	40	30	12	4	14	32	33	-	-	R16	-	-	-	-
2025-26	L1												-	-	-	-

Winner or champion
Runner-up or second
Semi-finalist or third
Promotion on top division
Relegation on lower division

Legend

Pts = points; P = play; W = wins; D = draws; L = losses; F = goals for; A = goals against; GD = goal difference; n.c. : not known

== See also ==
- MC Oran in African football
