= Mohamed Tiaïba =

Algerian footballer (born 1988)

Personal information
- Date of birth: July 26, 1988 (age 38)
- Place of birth: Bordj Ghédir, Algeria
- Height: 1.75 m (5 ft 9 in)
- Position: Forward

Team information
- Current team: MO Constantine

Senior career*
Years	Team	Apps	(Gls)
2007–2009	CA Bordj Bou Arréridj	-	(-)
2009–2011	USM Sétif	-	(-)
2011–2013	MC El Eulma	54	(16)
2013	CS Constantine	12	(4)
2013–2014	CA Bordj Bou Arréridj	14	(3)
2014	ES Sétif	7	(0)
2014–2015	USM El Harrach	17	(0)
2015–2016	RC Relizane	29	(13)
2016–2017	Al-Shahania	13	(6)
2017	Al-Markhiya	7	(10)
2017–2018	MC Oran	20	(8)
2018–2020	AS Aïn M'lila	36	(18)
2020–2021	Al-Tai	9	(2)
2021	AS Aïn M'lila	16	(5)
2021–	MO Constantine	0	(0)
- * Club domestic league appearances and goals as of 1 October 2021

Mohamed Tiaïba (Arabic: محمد طيايبة, born July 26, 1988) is an Algerian professional footballer who plays as a forward for MO Constantine.

In June 2016, Tiaiba signed a one-year contract with Qatargas League club Al-Markhiya .

In September 2020, Tiaiba signed a one-year contract with Prince Mohammad bin Salman League club Al-Tai .

== Honours ==
Individual

- Algerian Ligue Professionnelle 1 top scorer: 2015–16
