= Abdelkader Belharrane =

Algerian footballer (born 2000)

Personal information
- Full name: Abdelkader ALaa Eddine Belharrane
- Date of birth: 11 August 2000 (age 26)
- Place of birth: Oran, Algeria
- Height: 1.69 m (5 ft 7 in)
- Position: Right-back

Team information
- Current team: Olympique Akbou
- Number: 17

Youth career
- –2018: ASM Oran

Senior career*
Years	Team	Apps	(Gls)
2018–2019	ASM Oran		
2019–2021	CR Belouizdad	4	(0)
2021–2023	USM Alger	11	(1)
2023–2026	MC Oran	60	(1)
2026–	Olympique Akbou	1	(0)
- * Club domestic league appearances and goals as of 3 September 2026

Abdelkader ALaa Eddine Belharrane (Arabic: عبد القادر علاء الدين بلحران; born 11 August 2000) is an Algerian professional footballer who plays as a right-back for Olympique Akbou.

== Career ==
On 17 June 2022, Belharrane made his first league appearance and scored his first league goal against ES Sétif. On 10 June 2026, he joined Olympique Akbou.

== Honours ==
USM Alger

- CAF Confederation Cup: 2022–23
