= Mohamed Bengrina =

Algerian footballer (born 1996)

Personal information
- Full name: Mohamed Hacene Bengrina
- Date of birth: March 24, 1996 (age 30)
- Place of birth: Ouargla, Algeria
- Position: Midfielder

Youth career
- 2011–2013: DRB Staoueli
- 2013–2014: CR Belouizdad
- 2014–2017: USM Alger

Senior career*
Years	Team	Apps	(Gls)
2016–2019	USM Alger	6	(0)
2017–2018	→ US Biskra (loan)	10	(0)
2019–2022	ASO Chlef	48	(5)
2022–2024	MC Oran	35	(2)
2024–2025	ES Ben Aknoun		
2025–2026	ES Mostaganem	5	(0)
- * Club domestic league appearances and goals as of 5 June 2026

Mohamed Hacene Bengrina (Arabic: محمد حسان بن قرينة; born March 24, 1996) is an Algerian footballer. He plays primarily as an attacking midfielder.
