= Merouane Dahar =

Algerian footballer (born 1992)

Personal information
- Date of birth: December 25, 1992 (age 33)
- Place of birth: Sousse, Tunisia
- Position: Forward

Team information
- Current team: MC Oran
- Number: 19

Youth career
- –2010: ES Sahel

Senior career*
| Years | Team | Apps | (Gls) |
| 2010–2012 | ES Sahel | – | (–) |
| 2012–2014 | CR Belouizdad | 36 | (5) |
| 2014–2016 | ES Sétif | 13 | (1) |
| 2016 | MC Oran | 8 | (2) |
| 2016–2017 | USM El Harrach | 23 | (4) |
| 2017–2018 | CS Constantine | 16 | (1) |
| 2018–2019 | MO Béjaïa | 23 | (4) |
| 2019–2021 | AS Aïn M'lila | 42 | (3) |
| 2021– | MC Oran | 77 | (14) |
- * Club domestic league appearances and goals as of 14 August 2025

Merouane Dahar (Arabic: مروان دهار; born December 25, 1992) is an Algerian professional footballer who plays as a forward for MC Oran in the Algerian Ligue Professionnelle 1.

== Club career ==
Born in Sousse, Tunisia, Dahar started playing with ES Sahel. On January 13, 2016, he signed a contract with MC Oran, joining them on a transfer from ES Sétif.

== Honours ==
ES Sahel

- Tunisian Cup: 2012

ES Sétif

- Algerian Ligue 1: 2015
- Algerian Super Cup: 2015
- CAF Super Cup: 2015
