= Abdelhafid Benamara =

Algerian footballer (born 1995)

Personal information
- Date of birth: 1 October 1995 (age 31)
- Position: Midfielder

Team information
- Current team: US Biskra
- Number: 23

Senior career*
Years	Team	Apps	(Gls)
2015–2018	MC Oran	44	(1)
2018	USM El Harrach	9	(0)
2019–2025	MC Oran	149	(4)
2025–2026	ES Mostaganem	23	(0)
2026–	US Biskra	0	(0)
- * Club domestic league appearances and goals as of 28 July 2026

Abdelhafid Benamara (Arabic: عبد الحفيظ بن عمارة; born 1 October 1995) is an Algerian footballer who currently plays as a midfielder for US Biskra in the Algerian Ligue Professionnelle 1.

== Career ==
On 22 July 2025, Benamara joined ES Mostaganem after six seasons with MC Oran.

On 28 July 2026, he joined US Biskra.

== Career statistics ==
=== Club ===
As of 30 July 2018.

Club	Season	League			Cup		Continental		Other		Total	
Club	Season	Division	Apps	Goals	Apps	Goals	Apps	Goals	Apps	Goals	Apps	Goals
MC Oran	2015–16	Ligue 1	21	0	0	0	–		0	0	21	0
MC Oran	2016–17	Ligue 1	12	0	0	0	–		0	0	12	0
MC Oran	2017–18	Ligue 1	11	1	0	0	–		0	0	11	1
MC Oran	Total		44	1	0	0	0	0	0	0	44	1
USM El Harrach	2018–19	Ligue 1	9	0	0	0	–		0	0	9	0
MC Oran	2018–19	Ligue 1	10	0	2 (Note: Appearances in the Algerian Cup)	0	–		0	0	12	0
Career total			63	1	2	0	0	0	0	0	65	1
