= 2020–21 CR Belouizdad season =

CR Belouizdad
2020–21 season
- Owner: Madar Holding
- President: Charaf-Eddine Amara (until 18 May 2021); Mohamed Abrouk (from 18 May 2021)
- Head coach: Franck Dumas (until 30 March 2021); Zoran Manojlovic (from 20 April 2021)
- Stadium: Stade 20 Août 1955
- Ligue 1: 1st
- League Cup: Round of 16
- Super Cup: Winners
- Champions League: Quarter-finals
- Highest home attendance: 0 (Note: no one can attend games due to the COVID-19 pandemic)
- Lowest home attendance: 0 (Note: no one can attend games due to the COVID-19 pandemic)
- Average home league attendance: 0 (Note: no one can attend games due to the COVID-19 pandemic)
Home colours	Away colours

In the 2020–21 season, CR Belouizdad is competing in the Ligue 1 for the 55th season, as well as the Algerian Cup. It is their 32nd consecutive season in the top flight of Algerian football. They competing in Ligue 1, the Super Cup and the Champions League.

== Squad list ==
Players and squad numbers last updated on 15 November 2020.
Note: Flags indicate national team as has been defined under FIFA eligibility rules. Players may hold more than one non-FIFA nationality.

No.	Nat.	Position	Name	Date of Birth (Age)	Signed from
Goalkeepers
1	(Algeria)	GK	Gaya Merbah	22 July 1994 (aged 26)	(Algeria) NA Hussein Dey
16	(Algeria)	GK	Toufik Moussaoui	20 April 1991 (aged 29)	(Algeria) Paradou AC
26	(Algeria)	GK	Ahmed Abdelkader	19 February 1999 (aged 21)	(Algeria) Unattached
Defenders
2	(Algeria)	CB	Chouhaib Keddad	25 July 1994 (aged 26)	(Algeria) ASO Chlef
3	(Algeria)	LB	Chemseddine Nessakh	4 January 1988 (aged 32)	(Algeria) ES Sétif
4	(Algeria)	CB	Zakaria Khali	10 May 1990 (aged 30)	(Algeria) USM Bel Abbès
13	(Algeria)	CB	Anes Saad	19 January 1996 (aged 24)	(Algeria) USM Bel Abbès
18	(Algeria)	CB	Sofiane Bouchar	21 May 1994 (aged 26)	(Algeria) MC Oran
22	(Algeria)	RB	Mokhtar Belkhiter	15 January 1992 (aged 28)	(Tunisia) Club Africain
23	(Algeria)	RB	Zinelaabidine Boulakhoua	15 April 1990 (aged 30)	(Algeria) MC Alger
27	(Algeria)	LB	Rayen Hais Benderrouya	23 August 1997 (aged 23)	(Algeria) RC Kouba
Midfielders
5	(Algeria)	AM	Larbi Tabti	23 April 1993 (aged 27)	(Algeria) USM Bel Abbès
6	(Algeria)	DM	Zakaria Draoui	12 February 1994 (aged 26)	(Algeria) ES Sétif
7	(Algeria)	RW	Youcef Bechou	1 March 1997 (aged 23)	(Algeria) Youth system
8	(Algeria)	LW	Mohamed Islam Bakir	13 July 1996 (aged 24)	(Tunisia) CS Sfaxien
10	(Algeria)	AM	Amir Sayoud	30 September 1990 (aged 30)	(Algeria) USM Alger
12	(Algeria)	LW	Fouad Ghanem	16 November 1997 (aged 23)	(Algeria) JSM Bejaia
15	(Algeria)	DM	Housseyn Selmi	11 February 1993 (aged 27)	(Algeria) CA Batna
19	(Algeria)	DM	Adel Djerrar	3 March 1990 (aged 30)	(Algeria) JS Kabylie
21	(Algeria)	CM	Samir Aiboud	11 February 1993 (aged 27)	(Algeria) ES Sétif
24	(Algeria)	DM	Bilal Tarikat	12 June 1991 (aged 29)	(Algeria) RC Boumerdès
Forwards
9	(Algeria)	ST	Mohamed Souibaâh	25 December 1991 (aged 29)	(Algeria) ES Sétif
11	(Algeria)	ST	Ahmed Gasmi	22 November 1984 (aged 36)	(Algeria) NA Hussein Dey
13	(Algeria)	ST	Kheireddine Merzougui	16 August 1992 (aged 28)	(Algeria) JSM Skikda
14	(Algeria)	RW	Hicham Khalfallah	2 October 1991 (aged 29)	(Algeria) Olympique de Médéa
14	(Belgium)	ST	Maecky Ngombo	31 March 1995 (aged 25)	(Netherlands) Go Ahead Eagles
17	(Algeria)	LW	Khaled Bousseliou	3 July 1997 (aged 23)	(Algeria) Youth system
20	(Algeria)	ST	Hamza Belahouel	8 June 1993 (aged 27)	(Algeria) USM Bel Abbès
25	(Benin)	ST	Marcellin Koukpo	6 April 1995 (aged 25)	(Tunisia) CS Hammam-Lif

== Competitions ==
=== Overview ===
Competition	Record								Started round	Final position / round	First match	Last match
Competition	G	W	D	L	GF	GA	GD	Win %	Started round	Final position / round	First match	Last match
Ligue 1	38	22	13	3	69	27	+42	57.89	—N/a	Winners	11 December 2020	24 August 2021
League Cup	1	0	1	0	0	0	+0	0.00	Round of 16		8 May 2021	
Super Cup	1	1	0	0	2	1	+1	100.00	Final	Winners	21 November 2020	
Champions League	12	7	3	2	20	9	+11	58.33	Preliminary round	Quarter-finals	29 November 2020	22 May 2021
Total	52	30	17	5	91	37	+54	57.69				

Updated to match played 24 August 2021
Source: Competitions

== League table ==
Pos	Team	Pld	W	D	L	GF	GA	GD	Pts	Qualification or relegation
1	CR Belouizdad (C)	38	22	13	3	69	27	+42	79	Qualification for Champions League
2	ES Sétif	38	21	9	8	69	32	+37	71 (Note: On May 16, 2021 after not respecting Covid-19 tests regulation before RC Relizane match, ES Sétif Lost the match 2–0.)	Qualification for Champions League
3	JS Saoura	38	20	9	9	60	30	+30	69 (Note: On March 13, 2021 after the participation of a penalized player Oussama Meddahi against Paradou AC, JS Saoura Lost the match 3–0.)	Qualification for Confederation Cup
4	USM Alger	38	19	8	11	62	39	+23	65	
5	JS Kabylie	38	17	10	11	44	33	+11	61	Qualification for Confederation Cup

Updated to match(es) played on 28 August 2021. Source: dzfoot.com
Rules for classification: 1) points; 2) head-to-head points; 3) head-to-head goal difference; 4) goal difference; 5) total goals; 6) fairplay ranking; 7) playoff.
(C) Champions

=== Results summary ===
Overall								Home						Away					
Pld	W	D	L	GF	GA	GD	Pts	W	D	L	GF	GA	GD	W	D	L	GF	GA	GD
38	22	13	3	71	27	+44	79	14	4	1	40	15	+25	8	9	2	31	12	+19

Last updated: 24 August 2021.
Source: Competitive matches

=== Results by round ===
Round	1	2	3	4	5	6	7	8	9	10	11	12	13	14	15	16	17	18	19	20	21	22	23	24	25	26	27	28	29	30	31	32	33	34	35	36	37	38
Ground																																						
Result	D	W	W	W	D	D	D	D	W	W	D	W	D	D	W	W	D	L	L	W	W	W	D	W	D	W	W	W	W	D	W	L	W	W	D	W	W	W
Position	10	3	3	3	3	4	5	4	3	2	2	2	4	4	3	3	3	3	4	3	2	2	2	2	2	2	2	2	2	2	1	1	1	1	1	1	1	1

Updated to match(es) played on 24 August 2021. Source: Competitive matches
A = Away; H = Home; W = Win; D = Draw; L = Loss

=== Matches ===
On 22 October 2020, the Algerian Ligue Professionnelle 1 fixtures were announced.

11 December 2020 Round 3	JS Kabylie	0–3	CR Belouizdad	Tizi Ouzou
15:00		Soccerway report	Belahouel 25'; Sayoud 30'; Tabti 69'	Stadium: Stade 1er Novembre 1954; Attendance: 0 (Note: The match was played behind closed doors due to the COVID-19 pandemic in Algeria.); Referee: Yazid Ibrir

15 December 2020 Round 1	AS Ain M'lila	0–0	CR Belouizdad	Aïn M'lila
15:00		Soccerway report		Stadium: Touhami Zoubir Khelifi Stadium; Attendance: 0 Referee: Nabil Boukhalfa

19 December 2020 Round 4	CR Belouizdad	2–0	NA Hussein Dey	Belouizdad
14:30	Belahouel 45+2' (pen.); Souibaâh 88' (pen.)	Soccerway report		Stadium: Stade 20 Août 1955; Attendance: 0 Referee: Youcef Gamouh

31 December 2020 Round 2	CR Belouizdad	3–2	JSM Skikda	Belouizdad
14:30	Belahouel 9', 19'; Bechou 86' (pen.)	Soccerway report	Kaibou 23'; Merzougui 90+1'	Stadium: Stade 20 Août 1955; Attendance: 0 Referee: Amine Hansal

11 January 2021 Round 7	Paradou AC	1–1	CR Belouizdad	Dar El Beïda
14:00	Bouguerra 15'	Soccerway report	Koukpo 31'	Stadium: Omar Benrabah Stadium; Attendance: 0 Referee: Farouk Mial

16 January 2021 Round 8	CR Belouizdad	1–1	MC Oran	Belouizdad
14:30	Belahouel 22'	Soccerway report	Nekkache 26'	Stadium: Stade 20 Août 1955; Attendance: 0 Referee: Ahmed Bouzrar

22 January 2021 Round 9	RC Relizane	0–1	CR Belouizdad	Relizane
14:30		Soccerway report	Draoui 25'	Stadium: Stade Tahar Zoughari; Attendance: 0 Referee: Mehdi Abid Charef

26 January 2021 Round 10	CR Belouizdad	3–1	USM Bel Abbès	Belouizdad
14:30	Belkhir 19' (pen.); Selmi 24'; Sayoud 42'	Soccerway report	Haroun 50'	Stadium: Stade 20 Août 1955; Attendance: 0 Referee: Abdelmoumen Touabti

30 January 2021 Round 11	CR Belouizdad	1–1	ES Sétif	Belouizdad
14:30	Sayoud 77' (pen.)	Soccerway report	Debbari 35'	Stadium: Stade 20 Août 1955; Attendance: 0 Referee: Mohamed Saïdi

3 February 2021 Round 5	Olympique de Médéa	0–0	CR Belouizdad	Médéa
14:30		Soccerway report		Stadium: Stade Imam Lyes; Attendance: 0 Referee: Youcef Gamouh

8 March 2021 Round 6	CR Belouizdad	1–1	CS Constantine	Belouizdad
15:00	Belahouel 50'	Soccerway report	Amokrane 58'	Stadium: Stade 20 Août 1955; Attendance: 0 Referee: Amine Hansal

12 March 2021 Round 17	MC Alger	1–1	CR Belouizdad	Algiers
15:00	Belkheir 47'	Soccerway report	Koukpo 63'	Stadium: Stade du 5 Juillet; Attendance: 0 Referee: Mustapha Ghorbal

21 March 2021 Round 19	US Biskra	1–0	CR Belouizdad	Biskra
15:00	Yadroudj 52' (pen.)	Soccerway report		Stadium: Stade du 18 Février; Attendance: 0 Referee: Mehdi Abid Charef

24 March 2021 Round 12	ASO Chlef	1–3	CR Belouizdad	Chlef
15:00	Benzaza 52'	Soccerway report	Draoui 17'; Nessakh 41'; Belahouel 72'	Stadium: Stade Mohamed Boumezrag; Attendance: 0 Referee: Mustapha Bessiri

28 March 2021 Round 13	CR Belouizdad	1–1	WA Tlemcen	Belouizdad
15:00	Belkhiter 42'	Soccerway report	Aichi 90+4'	Stadium: Stade 20 Août 1955; Attendance: 0 Referee: Houssam Benyahia

16 April 2021 Round 14	NC Magra	0–0	CR Belouizdad	Magra
16:00		Soccerway report		Stadium: Boucheligue Brothers Stadium; Attendance: 0 Referee: Mohamed Saïdi

20 April 2021 Round 15	CA Bordj Bou Arreridj	1–3	CR Belouizdad	Bordj Bou Arréridj
22:30	Gagaa 27' (pen.)	Soccerway report	Nessakh 8'; Sayoud 21'; Belahouel 40'	Stadium: Stade 20 Août 1955; Attendance: 0 Referee: Ahmed Bouzrar

25 April 2021 Round 16	CR Belouizdad	2–1	JS Saoura	Algiers
22:30	Sayoud 38'; Keddad 64'	Soccerway report	Messaoudi 56' (pen.)	Stadium: Stade du 5 Juillet; Attendance: 0 Referee: Mehdi Abid Charef

30 April 2021 Round 18	CR Belouizdad	0–1	USM Alger	Belouizdad
16:00		Soccerway report	Benchaâ 90+4'	Stadium: Stade 20 Août 1955; Attendance: 0 Referee: Youcef Gamouh

4 May 2021 Round 20	CR Belouizdad	5–1	AS Ain M'lila	Bologhine
22:30	Sayoud 19', 38'; Merzougui 54'; Belahouel 78', 87'	Soccerway report	Elmammeri 89'	Stadium: Omar Hamadi Stadium; Attendance: 0 Referee: Mohamed Boutaraa

26 May 2021 Round 23	NA Hussein Dey	2–2	CR Belouizdad	Belouizdad
17:00	Boussalem 30'; Banouh 67'	Soccerway report	Sayoud 84', 90+3'	Stadium: Stade 20 Août 1955; Attendance: 0 Referee: Nabil Boukhalfa

30 May 2021 Round 24	CR Belouizdad	2–0	Olympique de Médéa	Belouizdad
17:00	Sayoud 21'; Khalfallah 68'	Soccerway report		Stadium: Stade 20 Août 1955; Attendance: 0 Referee: Mehdi Abid Charef

8 June 2021 Round 21	JSM Skikda	0–6	CR Belouizdad	Skikda
16:00		Soccerway report	Selmi 17'; Khalfallah 32', 33'; Merzougui 42'; Sayoud 43'; Tabti 64'	Stadium: Stade 20 Août 1955; Attendance: 0 Referee: Said Aouina

19 June 2021 Round 26	CR Belouizdad	1–0	Paradou AC	Belouizdad
17:00	Bouchar 33'	Soccerway report		Stadium: Stade 20 Août 1955; Attendance: 0 Referee: Houssam Benyahia

23 June 2021 Round 25	CS Constantine	0–0	CR Belouizdad	Constantine
17:00		Soccerway report		Stadium: Stade Ramdane Benabdelmalek; Attendance: 0 Referee: Abderrezzak Arab

27 June 2021 Round 27	MC Oran	0–3	CR Belouizdad	Oran
17:00		Soccerway report	Sayoud 48'; Belkhir 51'; Khalfallah 63'	Stadium: Ahmed Zabana Stadium; Attendance: 0 Referee: Abdelali Ibrir

1 July 2021 Round 28	CR Belouizdad	6–1	RC Relizane	Belouizdad
17:00	Keddad 14'; Khalfallah 41', 44'; Merzougui 69', 72', 81'	Soccerway report	Hitala 49'	Stadium: Stade 20 Août 1955; Attendance: 0 Referee: Adel Facih

4 July 2021 Round 29	USM Bel Abbès	0–2	CR Belouizdad	Sidi Bel Abbès
19:00		Soccerway report	Sayoud 50' (pen.), 81'	Stadium: Stade 24 Fevrier 1956; Attendance: 0 Referee: Boubekeur Zouaoui

8 July 2021 Round 30	ES Sétif	0–0	CR Belouizdad	Sétif
21:00		Soccerway report		Stadium: Stade 8 Mai 1945; Attendance: 0 Referee: Mehdi Abid Charef

13 July 2021 Round 31	CR Belouizdad	2–1	ASO Chlef	Belouizdad
18:00	Belkhir 52'; Bousseliou 73'	Soccerway report	Ouis 60'	Stadium: Stade 20 Août 1955; Attendance: 0 Referee: Youcef Gamouh

17 July 2021 Round 32	WA Tlemcen	2–1	CR Belouizdad	Tlemcen
18:00	Amiri 22'; Touil 84'	Soccerway report	Sayoud 12'	Stadium: Stade Akid Lotfi; Attendance: 0 Referee: Abdelmoumen Touabti

23 July 2021 Round 33	CR Belouizdad	1–0	NC Magra	Belouizdad
18:00	Nessakh 90+6'	Soccerway report		Stadium: Stade 20 Août 1955; Attendance: 0 Referee: Mohamed Boutaraa

27 July 2021 Round 34	CR Belouizdad	1–0	CA Bordj Bou Arreridj	Belouizdad
17:45	Merzougui 48'	Soccerway report		Stadium: Stade 20 Août 1955; Attendance: 0 Referee: Abdellah Benchehida

30 July 2021 Round 22	CR Belouizdad	2–1	JS Kabylie	Belouizdad
18:00	Nessakh 28'; Sayoud 44'	Soccerway report	Boualia 36'	Stadium: Stade 20 Août 1955; Attendance: 0 Referee: Abdelali Ibrir

9 August 2021 Round 35	JS Saoura	1–1	CR Belouizdad	Béchar
21:00	Lahmeri 60' (pen.)	Soccerway report	Draoui 39' (pen.)	Stadium: Stade 20 Août 1955; Attendance: 0 Referee: Mohamed Saïdi

16 August 2021 Round 36	CR Belouizdad	2–0	MC Alger	Belouizdad
17:30	Keddad 7'; Khalfallah 13'	Soccerway report		Stadium: Stade 20 Août 1955; Attendance: 0 Referee: Lahlou Benbraham

21 August 2021 Round 37	USM Alger	2–4	CR Belouizdad	Bologhine
21:00	Hamra 60'; Othmani 83'	Soccerway report	Sayoud 11', 45'; Khalfallah 30'; Mrezigue 74'	Stadium: Omar Hamadi Stadium; Attendance: 0 Referee: Abdelmoumen Touabti

24 August 2021 Round 38	CR Belouizdad	4–2	US Biskra	Belouizdad
17:30	Sayoud 14', 24'; Bousseliou 67'; Merzougui 83'	Soccerway report	Boukarroum 59' (pen.); Athmani 90+4'	Stadium: Stade 20 Août 1955; Attendance: 0 Referee: Ali Nader

== Algerian Super Cup ==
21 November 2020	USM Alger	1–2	CR Belouizdad	Algiers
20:30	Mahious 61'	Report	Sayoud 10' (pen.); Koukpo 33'	Stadium: Stade du 5 Juillet; Attendance: 0 (close doors); Referee: Youcef Gamouh

== Algerian League Cup ==
8 May 2021 Round of 16	CR Belouizdad	0–0 (a.e.t.) (2–4 p)	NC Magra	Algiers
22:30	Moussaoui, Boulakhoua (substituted off) 79' (Belkhiter, (substituted on) 79'), Bouchar, Nessakh, Khali, Draoui (substituted off) 79' (Selmi, (substituted on) 79'), Mrezigue, Tarikat (substituted off) 46' (Belahouel, (substituted on) 46'), Koukpo (substituted off) 46' (Sayoud, (substituted on) 46'), Merzougui, Khalfallah (substituted off) 100' (Djerrar, (substituted on) 100').		Bouhalfaya, Benkablia (substituted off) 60' (Bouguèche, (substituted on) 60'), Madani, Benkouider (substituted off) 81' (Righi, (substituted on) 81'), Aib, Fegaâs, Haïmoud, Soumana (substituted off) 60' (Demane, (substituted on) 60'), Bouchouareb, Bourahla, Belhamri.	Stadium: Stade du 5 Juillet; Attendance: 0 (close doors); Referee: Mohamed Saïdi
	Penalties
	Djerrar (penalty scored); Merzougui (penalty missed); Nessakh (penalty scored); Belahouel (penalty missed)		(penalty scored) Bouguèche; (penalty scored) Righi; (penalty scored) Kabri; (penalty scored) Fegas

== Champions League ==
=== Preliminary round ===
29 November 2020 First leg	CR Belouizdad (Algeria)	2–0	(Libya) Al Nasr	Algiers (Note: CR Belouizdad play their home matches at Stade du 5 Juillet, Algiers, instead of their regular home stadium Stade du 20 Août, Algiers, which did not meet CAF requirements.)
17:00 UTC+1	Koukpo 14'; Nessakh 66'	Report		Stadium: Stade du 5 Juillet; Attendance: 0 (close doors); Referee: Jalal Jayed (Morocco)

6 December 2020 Second leg	Al Nasr (Libya)	0–2 (0–4 agg.)	(Algeria) CR Belouizdad	Cairo (Egypt) (Note: Teams from Libya play their home matches outside the country due to security concerns from the ongoing civil war.)
18:00 UTC+2		Report	Keddad 17'; Fakroun 90' (o.g.)	Stadium: Petro Sport Stadium; Attendance: 0 (close doors); Referee: Naïm Housni (Tunisia)

=== First round ===
26 December 2020 (Note: The CR Belouizdad v Gor Mahia match, originally scheduled to be played on 23 December 2020, was rescheduled to be played on 26 December due to locked airspace in Kenya as a consequence of the COVID-19 pandemic in Kenya, which prevented Gor Mahia from traveling to Algeria in time of the original date.) First leg	CR Belouizdad (Algeria)	6–0	(Kenya) Gor Mahia	Algiers
20:45 UTC+1	Sayoud 6', 20' (pen.), 52'; Belahouel 12'; Tabti 43'; Ngombo 68'	Report		Stadium: Stade du 5 Juillet; Attendance: 0 (close doors); Referee: Sadok Selmi (Tunisia)

6 January 2021 Second leg	Gor Mahia (Kenya)	1–2 (1–8 agg.)	(Algeria) CR Belouizdad	Nairobi
15:00 UTC+3	Ulimwengu 23'	Report	Sayoud 78'; Belharrane 84'	Stadium: Nyayo National Stadium; Attendance: 0 (close doors)

=== Group stage ===
==== Group B ====
Pos	Team	Pld	W	D	L	GF	GA	GD	Pts	Qualification	MSD	CRB	TPM	HIL
1	(South Africa) Mamelodi Sundowns	6	4	1	1	10	4	+6	13	Advance to knockout stage	—	0–2	1–0	2–0
2	(Algeria) CR Belouizdad	6	2	3	1	6	6	0	9	Advance to knockout stage	1–5	—	2–0	1–1
3	(Democratic Republic of the Congo) TP Mazembe	6	1	2	3	3	6	−3	5		1–2	0–0	—	2–1
4	(Sudan) Al Hilal	6	0	4	2	2	5	−3	4		0–0	0–0	0–0	—

Source: Soccerway

12 February 2021 Matchday 1	TP Mazembe (Democratic Republic of the Congo)	0–0	(Algeria) CR Belouizdad	Lubumbashi
13:00 (15:00 UTC+2)		Report		Stadium: Stade TP Mazembe; Attendance: 0 (close doors); Referee: Eric Otogo-Castane (Gabon)

28 February 2021 (Note: The CR Belouizdad v Mamelodi Sundowns match, originally scheduled to be played at Stade du 5 Juillet, Algiers on 24 February 2021, was postponed due to restrictions related to the COVID-19 pandemic imposed by Algeria on travelers from South Africa out of concern of the variant 501.V2. The match was later rescheduled to be played outside Algeria on 28 February 2021 at National Stadium, Dar es Salaam (Tanzania).) Matchday 2	CR Belouizdad (Algeria)	1–5	(South Africa) Mamelodi Sundowns	Dar es Salaam (Tanzania)
13:00 (16:00 UTC+3)	Sayoud 44'	Report	Zwane 5' (pen.), 55'; Shalulile 8'; Maboe 75'; Erasmus 89'	Stadium: National Stadium; Attendance: 0 (close doors); Referee: Boubou Traoré (Mali)

5 March 2021 Matchday 3	CR Belouizdad (Algeria)	1–1	(Sudan) Al Hilal	Algiers
19:00 (20:00 UTC+1)	Koukpo 43'	Report	Abdel Rahman 3'	Stadium: Stade du 5 Juillet; Attendance: 0 (close doors); Referee: Maguette N'Diaye (Senegal)

16 March 2021 Matchday 4	Al Hilal (Sudan)	0–0	(Algeria) CR Belouizdad	Omdurman
13:00 (15:00 UTC+2)		Report		Stadium: Al Hilal Stadium; Attendance: 0 (close doors); Referee: Mohamed Maarouf (Egypt)

2 April 2021 Matchday 5	CR Belouizdad (Algeria)	2–0	(Democratic Republic of the Congo) TP Mazembe	Algiers
19:00 (20:00 UTC+1)	Sayoud 84'; Bechou 86'	Report		Stadium: Stade du 5 Juillet; Attendance: 0 (close doors); Referee: Mahmoud El Banna (Egypt)

9 April 2021 Matchday 6	Mamelodi Sundowns (South Africa)	0–2	(Algeria) CR Belouizdad	Pretoria
13:00 (15:00 UTC+2)		Report	Sayoud 29'; Gasmi 45'	Stadium: Loftus Versfeld Stadium; Attendance: 0 (close doors); Referee: Joshua Bondo (Botswana)

=== knockout stage ===
==== Quarter-finals ====
15 May 2021 First leg	CR Belouizdad (Algeria)	2–0	(Tunisia) Espérance de Tunis	Algiers
16:00 (17:00 UTC+1)	Draoui 35'; Sayoud 82'	Report		Stadium: Stade du 5 Juillet; Attendance: 0 (close doors); Referee: Jean-Jacques Ndala Ngambo (DR Congo)

22 May 2021 Second leg	Espérance de Tunis (Tunisia)	2–0 (3–2 p)	(Algeria) CR Belouizdad	Radès
16:00 (17:00 UTC+1)	Benguit 68'; Ben Romdhane 87'	Report		Stadium: Stade Olympique de Radès; Attendance: 0 (close doors); Referee: Bakary Gassama (Gambia)
	Penalties
	Ben Romdhane (penalty scored); Badri (penalty scored); Chaalali (penalty missed); Benguit (penalty scored)		(penalty missed) Sayoud; (penalty scored) Gasmi; (penalty scored) Draoui; (penalty missed) Djerrar; (penalty missed) Nessakh

== Squad information ==
=== Playing statistics ===
No.	Pos	Nat	Player	Total		Ligue 1		League Cup		Super Cup		Champions League	
No.	Pos	Nat	Player	Apps	Goals	Apps	Goals	Apps	Goals	Apps	Goals	Apps	Goals
Goalkeepers
1	GK	(Algeria) ALG	Gaya Merbah	16	0	12	0	0	0	0	0	4	0
16	GK	(Algeria) ALG	Toufik Moussaoui	33	0	23	0	1	0	1	0	8	0
26	GK	(Algeria) ALG	Ahmed Abdelkader	3	0	3	0	0	0	0	0	0	0
Defenders
2	DF	(Algeria) ALG	Chouhaib Keddad	32	4	22	3	0	0	1	0	9	1
3	DF	(Algeria) ALG	Chemseddine Nessakh	39	5	27	4	1	0	1	0	10	1
4	DF	(Algeria) ALG	Zakaria Khali	21	0	14	0	1	0	0	0	6	0
13	DF	(Algeria) ALG	Anes Saad	0	0	0	0	0	0	0	0	0	0
18	DF	(Algeria) ALG	Sofiane Bouchar	43	1	29	1	1	0	1	0	12	0
22	DF	(Algeria) ALG	Mokhtar Belkhiter	39	0	30	0	1	0	0	0	8	0
23	DF	(Algeria) ALG	Zinelaabidine Boulakhoua	33	0	23	0	1	0	1	0	8	0
27	DF	(Algeria) ALG	Rayen Hais Benderrouya	35	0	28	0	0	0	0	0	7	0
36	DF	(Algeria) ALG	Abdelkader Belharrane	6	1	4	0	0	0	0	0	2	1
Midfielders
5	MF	(Algeria) ALG	Larbi Tabti	24	3	18	2	0	0	1	0	5	1
6	MF	(Algeria) ALG	Zakaria Draoui	47	4	34	3	1	0	1	0	11	1
7	MF	(Algeria) ALG	Youcef Bechou	22	2	16	1	0	0	1	0	5	1
8	MF	(Algeria) ALG	Mohamed Islam Bakir	20	0	15	0	0	0	0	0	5	0
10	MF	(Algeria) ALG	Amir Sayoud	44	28	31	19	1	0	1	1	11	8
15	MF	(Algeria) ALG	Housseyn Selmi	30	2	22	2	1	0	0	0	7	0
19	MF	(Algeria) ALG	Adel Djerrar	7	0	4	0	1	0	0	0	2	0
21	MF	(Algeria) ALG	Samir Aiboud	13	0	7	0	0	0	1	0	5	0
24	MF	(Algeria) ALG	Bilal Tarikat	28	0	18	0	1	0	1	0	8	0
31	MF	(Algeria) ALG	Haroune Benmenni	1	0	0	0	0	0	0	0	1	0
	MF	(Algeria) ALG	Akram Bouras	12	0	12	0	0	0	0	0	0	0
Forwards
9	FW	(Algeria) ALG	Mohamed Souibaâh	3	0	2	0	0	0	1	0	0	0
11	FW	(Algeria) ALG	Ahmed Gasmi	25	1	20	0	0	0	0	0	5	1
13	FW	(Algeria) ALG	Kheireddine Merzougui	18	7	17	7	1	0	0	0	0	0
14	FW	(Algeria) ALG	Hicham Khalfallah	17	8	16	8	1	0	0	0	0	0
17	FW	(Algeria) ALG	Khaled Bousseliou	13	2	11	2	0	0	1	0	1	0
20	FW	(Algeria) ALG	Hamza Belahouel	18	11	14	10	1	0	0	0	3	1
25	FW	(Benin) BEN	Marcellin Koukpo	29	5	19	2	1	0	1	1	8	2
28	FW	(Algeria) ALG	Mohamed Islam Belkhir	30	4	26	4	0	0	0	0	4	0
33	FW	(Algeria) ALG	Houssem Eddine Mrezigue	44	1	34	1	1	0	0	0	9	0
Players transferred out during the season
12	MF	(Algeria) ALG	Fouad Ghanem	0	0	0	0	0	0	0	0	0	0
14	FW	(Belgium) BEL	Maecky Ngombo	12	1	6	0	0	0	0	0	6	1

Last updated: 1 June 2018
Source: fr.soccerway.com

=== Goalscorers ===
Includes all competitive matches. The list is sorted alphabetically by surname when total goals are equal.

No.	Nat.	Player	Pos.	L 1	LC	SC	CL 1	TOTAL
10	(Algeria)	Amir Sayoud	MF	19	0	1	8	28
20	(Algeria)	Hamza Belahouel	FW	10	0	0	1	11
14	(Algeria)	Hicham Khalfallah	FW	8	0	0	0	8
13	(Algeria)	Kheireddine Merzougui	FW	7	0	0	0	7
3	(Algeria)	Chemseddine Nessakh	DF	4	0	0	1	5
25	(Benin)	Marcellin Koukpo	FW	2	0	1	2	5
6	(Algeria)	Zakaria Draoui	MF	3	0	0	1	4
2	(Algeria)	Chouaïb Keddad	DF	3	0	0	1	4
28	(Algeria)	Mohamed Islam Belkhir	FW	3	0	0	0	3
5	(Algeria)	Larbi Tabti	MF	2	0	0	1	3
7	(Algeria)	Youcef Bechou	MF	1	0	0	1	2
15	(Algeria)	Housseyn Selmi	MF	2	0	0	0	2
17	(Algeria)	Khaled Bousseliou	FW	2	0	0	0	2
14	(Belgium)	Maecky Ngombo	FW	0	0	0	1	1
11	(Algeria)	Ahmed Gasmi	FW	0	0	0	1	1
9	(Algeria)	Mohamed Souibaâh	FW	1	0	0	0	1
36	(Algeria)	Abdelkader Belharrane	DF	0	0	0	1	1
22	(Algeria)	Mokhtar Belkhiter	DF	1	0	0	0	1
18	(Algeria)	Sofiane Bouchar	DF	1	0	0	0	1
33	(Algeria)	Houssem Eddine Mrezigue	MF	1	0	0	0	1
Own Goals				0	0	0	1	0
Totals				69	0	3	20	92

== Transfers ==
=== In ===
Date	Pos	Player	From club	Transfer fee	Source
6 August 2020	MF	(Algeria) Zakaria Draoui	ES Sétif	Free transfer	
25 August 2020	DF	(Algeria) Mokhtar Belkhiter	(Tunisia) Club Africain	Free transfer	
3 September 2020	FW	(Belgium) Maecky Ngombo	(Netherlands) Go Ahead Eagles	Free transfer	
7 September 2020	GK	(Algeria) Toufik Moussaoui	Paradou AC	14,000,000 DA	
15 September 2020	FW	(Benin) Marcellin Koukpo	(Tunisia) CS Hammam-Lif	Free transfer	
24 October 2020	MF	(Algeria) Mohamed Islam Bakir	(Tunisia) CS Sfaxien	Free transfer	
4 April 2021	ST	(Algeria) Kheireddine Merzougui	JSM Skikda	Undisclosed	
11 April 2021	RW	(Algeria) Hicham Khalfallah	Olympique de Médéa	Free transfer	

=== Out ===
Date	Pos	Player	To club	Transfer fee	Source
31 August 2020	FW	(Algeria) Ahmed Gasmi	Unattached	Free transfer (Released)	
31 August 2020	MF	(Algeria) Toufik Zerara	Unattached	Free transfer (Released)	
31 August 2020	FW	(Algeria) Islam Bendif	Unattached	Free transfer (Released)	
8 September 2020	DF	(Algeria) Mohamed Khoutir Ziti	Unattached (Note: Ziti joined Nasr Benghazi on 4 November 2020.)	Free transfer (Released)	
5 October 2020	GK	(Algeria) Khairi Barki	ES Sétif	Free transfer (Released)	
27 October 2020	FW	(Niger) Boubacar Hainikoye Soumana	NC Magra	Loan for one year	
27 October 2020	FW	(Algeria) Redouane Maâchou	USM Bel Abbès	Loan for two years	
9 April 2021	LW	(Algeria) Fouad Ghanem	JS Kabylie	Free transfer	
6 April 2021	FW	(Belgium) Maecky Ngombo	Unattached (Note: Ngombo joined FC Botoșani on 24 June 2021.)	Free transfer (Released)	
