= 2018–19 CR Belouizdad season =

CR Belouizdad
2018–19 season
- Owner: Madar Holding (from 26 September 2018)
- President: Mohamed Bouhafs
- Head coach: Azzedine Aït Djoudi (from 11 June 2018) (until 26 June 2018); Lamine Bougherara (from 27 June 2018) (until 5 July 2018); Taoufik Rouabah (from 18 July 2018) (until 25 July 2018); Tahar Chérif El-Ouazzani (from 26 July 2018) (until 30 September 2018); Abdelkader Amrani (from 4 December 2018)
- Stadium: Stade 20 Août 1955, Algiers
- Ligue 1: 8th
- Algerian Cup: Winners
- Top goalscorer: League: Youcef Bechou (7); All: Youcef Bechou (8)

In the 2018–19 season, CR Belouizdad competed in Ligue 1 for the 53rd season, as well as the Algerian Cup.

== Squad list ==
Players and squad numbers last updated on 18 November 2018.
Note: Flags indicate national team as has been defined under FIFA eligibility rules. Players may hold more than one non-FIFA nationality.

No.	Nat.	Position	Name	Date of birth (age)	Signed from
Goalkeepers
Defenders
Midfielders
Forwards

== Competitions ==
=== Overview ===
Competition	Record								Started round	Final position / round	First match	Last match
Competition	G	W	D	L	GF	GA	GD	Win %	Started round	Final position / round	First match	Last match
Ligue 1	30	10	11	9	28	27	+1	33.33	—N/a	8th	11 August 2018	26 May 2019
Algerian Cup	8	6	0	2	13	3	+10	75.00	Round of 64	Winners	18 December 2018	8 June 2019
Total	38	16	11	11	41	30	+11	42.11				

Updated to match played 28 May 2018
Source: Competitions

== League table ==
Pos	Team	Pld	W	D	L	GF	GA	GD	Pts	Qualification or relegation
6	MC Alger	30	11	10	9	35	36	−1	43	Qualification for Arab Club Champions Cup
7	CS Constantine	30	10	10	10	30	24	+6	40	Qualification for Arab Club Champions Cup
8	CR Belouizdad	30	10	11	9	28	27	+1	38 (Note: CR Belouizdad were deducted 3 points.)	Qualification for Confederation Cup (Note: CR Belouizdad are Algerian Cup winners.)
9	CA Bordj Bou Arreridj	30	9	10	11	22	24	−2	37	
10	MC Oran	30	8	12	10	33	38	−5	36 (Note: Head-to-head: MC Oran 7 points; NA Hussein Dey 5 points; AS Aïn M'lila 3 points.)	

Source: DZFoot
Rules for classification: 1) points; 2) head-to-head points; 3) head-to-head goal difference; 4) goal difference; 5) total goals; 6) fairplay ranking; 7) playoff.

=== Results summary ===
Overall								Home						Away					
Pld	W	D	L	GF	GA	GD	Pts	W	D	L	GF	GA	GD	W	D	L	GF	GA	GD
30	10	11	9	28	27	+1	41	7	4	4	16	12	+4	3	7	5	12	15	−3

Last updated: 28 May 2018.
Source: Competitive matches

=== Results by round ===
Round	1	2	3	4	5	6	7	8	9	10	11	12	13	14	15	16	17	18	19	20	21	22	23	24	25	26	27	28	29	30
Ground	H	A	H	A	H	A	H	A	H	A	H	A	H	A	H	A	H	A	H	A	H	A	H	A	H	A	H	A	H	A
Result	L	D	D	W	L	L	L	L	D	L	W	D	L	W	L	D	D	D	D	W	W	W	D	W	W	W	D	D	L	W
Position	16	16	16	16	16	16	16	16	16	16	16	16	16	16	16	16	16	16	16	16	14	11	12	11	10	9	9	9	12	8

Updated to match(es) played on 16 May 2019. Source: Competitive matches
A = Away; H = Home; W = Win; D = Draw; L = Loss

=== Matches ===
Win Draw Loss

11 August 2018 Round 1	CR Belouizdad	0–3	AS Ain M'lila	Belouizdad
17:00		Soccerway report		Stadium: Stade 20 Août 1955; Referee: Mustapha Bessiri
Note: Penalty lost to the CR Belouizdad to award the win to the AS Ain M'lila who scores three (03) points and a score of 3/0.

18 August 2018 Round 2	Paradou AC	0–0	CR Belouizdad	Bologhine
21:00		Soccerway report		Stadium: Omar Hamadi Stadium; Referee: Merzoug Brahimi

1 September 2018 Round 4	CR Belouizdad	2–1	DRB Tadjenanet	Belouizdad
17:00	Hérida 30'; Kenniche 75'	Soccerway report	Bensaha 68'	Stadium: Stade 20 Août 1955; Referee: Lahlou Benbraham

4 September 2018 Round 3	CR Belouizdad	0–0	MC Alger	Belouizdad
17:00		Soccerway report		Stadium: Stade 20 Août 1955; Referee: Lotfi Bekouassa

10 September 2018 Round 5	ES Sétif	3–2	CR Belouizdad	Sétif
19:00	Lakroum 10' (pen.); Bouguelmouna 84' (pen.), 90+6'	Soccerway report	Bourenane 28', 43'	Stadium: Stade 8 Mai 1945; Referee: Ahmed Bouzrar

15 September 2018 Round 6	CR Belouizdad	0–1	Olympique de Médéa	Belouizdad
17:00		Soccerway report	Addadi 82'	Stadium: Stade 20 Août 1955; Referee: Rafik Achouri

21 September 2018 Round 7	JS Kabylie	2–0	CR Belouizdad	Tizi Ouzou
17:00	Benaldjia 45+2' (pen.); Nwofor 72'	Soccerway report		Stadium: November 1, 1954 Stadium; Referee: Boubekeur Zouaoui

29 September 2018 Round 8	CR Belouizdad	0–1	MC Oran	Belouizdad
16:00		Soccerway report	Nadji 60'	Stadium: Stade 20 Août 1955; Referee: Abderrezzak Arab

5 October 2018 Round 9	CS Constantine	1–1	CR Belouizdad	Constantine
17:00	Belkacemi 36'	Soccerway report	Djarrar 74'	Stadium: Stade Mohamed Hamlaoui; Referee: Farouk Mial

10 October 2018 Round 10	CR Belouizdad	0–1	USM Alger	Belouizdad
16:00		Soccerway report	Yaya 37'	Stadium: Stade 20 Août 1955; Referee: Mohamed Saïdi

19 October 2018 Round 11	NA Hussein Dey	0–2	CR Belouizdad	Algiers
17:00		Soccerway report	Djarrar 34'; Chettal 86' (pen.)	Stadium: July 5, 1962 Stadium; Referee: Mustapha Ghorbal

30 October 2018 Round 12	CR Belouizdad	1–1	CA Bordj Bou Arreridj	Belouizdad
15:00	Bechou 80'	Soccerway report	Mellel 79' (pen.)	Stadium: Stade 20 Août 1955; Attendance: 0 (close doors); Referee: Abderrezzak Arab

6 November 2018 Round 13	JS Saoura	2–0	CR Belouizdad	Béchar
18:00	Hammia 9', 57' (pen.)	Soccerway report		Stadium: Stade 20 Août 1955; Referee: Farouk Mial

10 November 2018 Round 14	CR Belouizdad	4–1	MO Béjaïa	Belouizdad
16:00	Nessakh 18'; Djerrar 29'; Bechou 86'; Balegh 88'	Soccerway report	Amokrane 90+1'	Stadium: Stade 20 Août 1955; Referee: Nabil Boukhalfa

22 November 2018 Round 15	USM Bel Abbès	1–0	CR Belouizdad	Sidi Bel Abbès
16:00	Tabti 7' (pen.)	Soccerway report		Stadium: Stade 24 Fevrier 1956; Referee: Redouane Necib

4 January 2019 Round 16	AS Ain M'lila	1–1	CR Belouizdad	Batna
15:00	Tiaïba 84'	Soccerway report	Bechou 31'	Stadium: November 1, 1954 Stadium; Referee: Abderrezzak Arab

12 January 2019 Round 17	CR Belouizdad	0–0	Paradou AC	Belouizdad
15:00		Soccerway report		Stadium: Stade 20 Août 1955; Referee: Mohamed Saïdi

17 January 2019 Round 18	MC Alger	1–1	CR Belouizdad	Algiers
17:45	Souibaâh 50'	Soccerway report	Balegh 71'	Stadium: July 5, 1962 Stadium; Referee: Rafik Achouri

25 January 2019 (Note: The match was originally to be played on 25 January 2019, 17:45, but it was postponed due to heavy snowfall.) Round 19	DRB Tadjenanet	–	CR Belouizdad	Tadjenanet
17:45		Soccerway report		Stadium: Lahoua Smaïl Stadium; Referee: Redouane Necib

5 February 2019 Round 20	CR Belouizdad	1–0	ES Sétif	Belouizdad
15:00	Bouchar 43'	Soccerway report		Stadium: Stade 20 Août 1955; Referee: Abderrezzak Arab

9 February 2019 Round 21	Olympique de Médéa	0–1	CR Belouizdad	Médéa
15:00		Soccerway report	Sayoud 6' (pen.)	Stadium: Stade Imam Lyes de Médéa; Referee: Mustapha Bessiri

13 February 2019 Round 22	CR Belouizdad	2–1	JS Kabylie	Belouizdad
15:00	Nessakh 45'; Djerrar 80'	Soccerway report	Nessakh 6' (o.g.)	Stadium: Stade 20 Août 1955; Referee: Nabil Boukhalfa

3 March 2019 Round 23	MC Oran	1–1	CR Belouizdad	Oran
16:00	Nessakh 8' (o.g.)	Soccerway report	Soumana 58'	Stadium: Ahmed Zabana Stadium; Referee: Rafik Achouri

3 April 2019 Round 25	USM Alger	2–3	CR Belouizdad	Bologhine
18:00	Zouari 31'; Meziane 59'	Soccerway report	Bechou 17', 40'; Sayoud 29' (pen.)	Stadium: Omar Hamadi Stadium; Referee: Farouk Mial

9 April 2019 Round 19	DRB Tadjenanet	0–0	CR Belouizdad	Tadjenanet
18:00		Soccerway report		Stadium: Lahoua Smaïl Stadium; Referee: Said Aouina

21 April 2019 Round 26	CR Belouizdad	2–0	NA Hussein Dey	Belouizdad
16:00	Nessakh 18'; Bechou 86'	Soccerway report		Stadium: Stade 20 Août 1955; Referee: Ahmed Bouzrar

6 May 2019 Round 24	CR Belouizdad	2–1	CS Constantine	Belouizdad
16:00	Balegh 12'; Bechou 54'	Soccerway report	Yettou 6'	Stadium: Stade 20 Août 1955; Referee: Nabil Boukhalfa

11 May 2019 Round 27	CA Bordj Bou Arreridj	0–0	CR Belouizdad	Bordj Bou Arréridj
22:30		Soccerway report		Stadium: Stade 20 Août 1955; Referee: Mustapha Bessiri

16 May 2019 Round 28	CR Belouizdad	1–1	JS Saoura	Belouizdad
22:30	Rabti 3'	Soccerway report	Hammia 8'	Stadium: Stade 20 Août 1955; Referee: Mehdi Abid Charef

21 May 2019 Round 29	MO Béjaïa	1–0	CR Belouizdad	Béjaïa
22:30	Amokrane 68'	Soccerway report		Stadium: Stade de l'Unité Maghrébine; Referee: Rafik Achouri

26 May 2019 Round 30	CR Belouizdad	1–0	USM Bel Abbès	Belouizdad
22:30	Sayoud 23'	Soccerway report		Stadium: Stade 20 Août 1955; Referee: Said Aouina

== Algerian Cup ==
18 December 2018 Round of 64	DRB Tadjenanet	0–2	CR Belouizdad	Tadjenanet
17:00			28' Balegh; 53' Bechou	Stadium: Lahoua Smaïl Stadium; Referee: Mohamed Saïdi

29 December 2018 Round of 32	CA Batna	0–1	CR Belouizdad	Batna
14:00			74' Bouchar	Stadium: Mustapha Seffouhi Stadium; Referee: Nabil Boukhalfa

21 January 2019 Round of 16	CR Belouizdad	3–0	SA Mohammadia	Belouizdad
15:00	Chettal 45+2'; Sayoud 71'; Balegh 85'			Stadium: Stade 20 Août 1955; Referee: Yazid Ibrir

19 February 2019 QF 1st leg	CR Belouizdad	0–1	NA Hussein Dey	Algiers
15:00			Khacef 36'	Stadium: Stade du 5 Juillet; Referee: Mehdi Abid Charef

28 March 2019 QF 2nd leg	NA Hussein Dey	1–3	CR Belouizdad	Algiers
17:00	Yaya 42'		Keddad 29', 60'; Sayoud 83' (pen.)	Stadium: Stade du 5 Juillet; Referee: Lotfi Bekouassa

17 April 2019 SF 1st leg	CS Constantine	1–0	CR Belouizdad	Constantine
17:00	Abid 68'			Stadium: Mohamed Hamlaoui Stadium; Referee: Lahlou Benbraham

24 April 2019 SF 2nd leg	CR Belouizdad	2–0 (a.e.t.)	CS Constantine	Belouizdad
16:00	Djerrar 74'; Benderrouya 99'			Stadium: Stade 20 Août 1955; Referee: Missoum Benabdellah

8 June 2019 Final	CR Belouizdad	2–0	JSM Béjaïa	Blida
17:00	Sayoud 76'; Bousseliou 90+5'	Report		Stadium: Mustapha Tchaker Stadium; Attendance: 28,000; Referee: Mohamed Saïdi

== Squad information ==
=== Playing statistics ===
No.	Pos	Nat	Player	Total		Ligue 1		Algerian Cup	
No.	Pos	Nat	Player	Apps	Goals	Apps	Goals	Apps	Goals
Goalkeepers
1	GK	(Algeria) ALG	Lyes Meziane	14	0	13	0	1	0
16	GK	(Algeria) ALG	Cédric Si Mohamed	23	0	16	0	7	0
Defenders
18	DF	(Algeria) ALG	Sofiane Bouchar	22	2	14	1	8	1
23	DF	(Algeria) ALG	Zinelaabidine Boulakhoua	28	0	21	0	7	0
27	DF	(Algeria) ALG	Rayen Hais Benderrouya	23	1	20	0	3	1
28	DF	(Algeria) ALG	Mohamed Herida	16	1	15	1	1	0
20	DF	(Algeria) ALG	Rabah Mokrani	1	0	1	0	0	0
3	DF	(Algeria) ALG	Chemseddine Nessakh	33	3	25	3	8	0
12	DF	(Algeria) ALG	Meziane Zeroual	9	0	6	0	3	0
Midfielders
22	MF	(Algeria) ALG	Djelloul Benrokia	1	0	1	0	0	0
11	MF	(Algeria) ALG	Djamel Chettal	23	3	19	2	4	1
19	MF	(Algeria) ALG	Adel Djerrar	30	5	24	4	6	1
2	MF	(Algeria) ALG	Chouhaib Keddad	31	2	24	0	7	2
	MF	(Algeria) ALG	Noufel Ould Hamou	3	0	3	0	0	0
10	MF	(Algeria) ALG	Amir Sayoud	19	6	13	3	6	3
14	MF	(Algeria) ALG	Housseyn Selmi	32	0	25	0	7	0
6	MF	(Mali) MLI	Soumaila Sidibe	12	0	12	0	0	0
24	MF	(Algeria) ALG	Bilal Tarikat	34	0	27	0	7	0
Forwards
	FW	(Algeria) ALG	Mohamed Attia	6	0	5	0	1	0
7	FW	(Algeria) ALG	Abou Sofiane Balegh	36	4	28	2	8	2
5	FW	(Algeria) ALG	Youcef Bechou	31	8	23	7	8	1
17	FW	(Algeria) ALG	Khaled Bousseliou	28	1	20	0	8	1
25	FW	(Niger) NIG	Boubacar Hainikoye Soumana	5	1	2	1	3	0
	FW	(Algeria) ALG	Ahmed Bilel Kerrouche	1	0	1	0	0	0
14	FW	(Algeria) ALG	Djamel Rabti	16	1	14	1	2	0
	FW	(Algeria) ALG	Akram Chakib Saïdani	1	0	1	0	0	0
Players transferred out during the season

Last updated: 1 June 2018
Source: fr.soccerway.com

== Squad list ==
As of August 11, 2018. Note: Flags indicate national team as defined under FIFA eligibility rules; some limited exceptions apply. Players may hold more than one non-FIFA nationality.

No.	Pos.	Nation	Player
1	GK	ALG	Lyes Meziane
2	DF	ALG	Chouhaib Keddad
3	DF	ALG	Chemseddine Nessakh
4	DF	ALG	Ryad Kenniche
5	MF	ALG	Youcef Bechou
6	MF	MLI	Soumaila Sidibe
7	FW	ALG	Abou Sofiane Balegh
11	FW	ALG	Djamel Chettal
13	DF	ALG	Mohamed Lamine Bramki
14	MF	ALG	Djamel Rabti
15	MF	ALG	Housseyn Selmi
16	GK	ALG	Cédric Si Mohamed

No.	Pos.	Nation	Player
17	FW	ALG	Khaled Bousseliou
19	MF	ALG	Adel Djerrar
20	MF	ALG	Rabah Mokrani
21	MF	ALG	Faouzi Bourenane
22	MF	ALG	Djelloul Ben Rokia
23	DF	ALG	Zinelaabidine Boulakhoua
24	MF	ALG	Bilal Tarikat
26	FW	ALG	Yassine Benouadah
27	DF	ALG	Rayen Hais Benderrouya
28	FW	ALG	Mohamed Herida
29	FW	ALG	Nazim Harchaoui
30	GK	ALG	Abdelmalek Khali

== Transfers ==
=== In ===
Date	Pos	Player	From club	Transfer fee	Source
21 June 2018	DF	(Algeria) Ryad Kenniche	USM Alger	Free transfer (Released)	
22 June 2018	MF	(France) (Algeria) Nadir Chelbab	(France) SA Thiers	Free transfer	
22 June 2018	MF	(Algeria) Djamel Rabti	CA Bordj Bou Arreridj	Free transfer	
22 June 2018	MF	(Algeria) Adel Djerrar	JS Kabylie	Free transfer	
22 June 2018	DF	(Algeria) Chouaib Keddad	ASO Chlef	Free transfer	
22 June 2018	FW	(Algeria) Djamel Chettal	USM Bel Abbès	Free transfer	
22 June 2018	DF	(Algeria) Zine El Abidine Boulekhoua	MC Alger	Free transfer	
23 June 2018	FW	(Algeria) Abou Sofiane Balegh	MC Alger	Free transfer (Released)	
23 June 2018	GK	(Algeria) Faouzi Chaouchi	MC Alger	Free transfer (Released)	
17 July 2018	GK	(Algeria) Cédric Si Mohamed	US Biskra	Free transfer (Released)	
9 August 2018	MF	(Guinea) Mohamed Thiam	JS Kabylie	Free transfer	
9 August 2018	MF	(Algeria) Abdelaziz Kebbal	CS Constantine	Free transfer	
15 January 2019	MF	(Niger) Hainikoye Boubacar	(Ghana) Aduana Stars	Free transfer	

=== Out ===
Date	Pos	Player	To club	Transfer fee	Source
27 May 2018	MF	(Algeria) Zakaria Draoui	ES Sétif	Free transfer	
28 May 2018	FW	(Algeria) Sid Ali Lakroum	ES Sétif	Free transfer	
4 June 2018	GK	(Algeria) Abdelkader Salhi	JS Kabylie	Free transfer	
11 June 2018	DF	(Algeria) Amir Belaïli	JS Kabylie	Free transfer	
19 June 2018	MF	(Algeria) Mokhtar Amir Lamhene	AS Ain M'lila	Free transfer	
23 June 2018	DF	(Algeria) Mohamed Namani	(Saudi Arabia) Al-Fateh	Free transfer	
5 July 2018	MF	(Algeria) Mohamed Adem Izghouti	DRB Tadjenanet	Free transfer	
7 July 2018	GK	(Algeria) Faouzi Chaouchi	CA Bordj Bou Arreridj	Free transfer (Released)	
18 July 2018	DF	(Algeria) Hakim Khoudi	AS Ain M'lila	Free transfer	
