= 2019–20 CR Belouizdad season =

CR Belouizdad
2019–20 season
- Owner: Madar Holding
- Sports director: Saïd Allik (until 2 January 2020); Toufik Korichi (from 2 January 2020)
- Head coach: Abdelkader Amrani (until 26 December 2019); Franck Dumas (from 13 January 2020)
- Stadium: Stade 20 Août 1955
- Ligue 1: 1st
- Algerian Cup: Round of 16
- Confederation Cup: First round
- Top goalscorer: League: Amir Sayoud (5 goals); All: Amir Sayoud (9 goals)
Home colours	Away colours

In the 2019–20 season, CR Belouizdad competed in Ligue 1 for the 54th season, as well as for the CAF Confederation Cup and the Algerian Cup. On March 15, 2020, the Ligue de Football Professionnel (LFP) decided to halt the season due to the COVID-19 pandemic in Algeria. On July 29, 2020, the LFP declared that season is over and CR Belouizdad to be the champion, the promotion of four teams from the League 2, and scraping the relegation for the current season.

== Summary season ==
After the big problems last season, Where almost the team dropped to the second division with the start of the new season, coach Abdelkader Amrani decided to stay and his first decisions was to demobilize seven players, who are Mohamed Attia, Lyes Meziane, Mohamed Herida, Meziane Zeroual, Abou Sofiane Balegh, Djamel Chettal and Djamel Rabti., CR Belouizdad contracted the same number of laid-off players who are Zakaria Khali and Larbi Tabti from USM Bel Abbès, Ahmed Gasmi and Gaya Merbah from NA Hussein Dey, Mohamed Khoutir Ziti, Islam Bendif and Ivorian Kouame Noel N'Guessan from Séwé FC. With the start of the season, CR Belouizdad is the only team that has not had any financial problems thanks to Madar Holding Company and One of the goals of CR Belouizdad this season is to win the league title absent since the 2000–01 season The start was good, where the team was unbeaten in eight consecutive league matches until the tenth round against CS Constantine. On December 26, Amrani decided to resign. after that Madar Company appointed a new sports director in the place of Saïd Allik, Toufik Korichi. On January 9, after MC Alger lost to ES Sétif CR Belouizdad won the honorary title of winter champion.

== Squad list ==
Players and squad numbers last updated on 18 November 2018.
Note: Flags indicate national team as has been defined under FIFA eligibility rules. Players may hold more than one non-FIFA nationality.

No.	Nat.	Position	Name	Date of birth (age)	Signed from
Goalkeepers
1	(Algeria)	GK	Gaya Merbah	22 July 1994 (aged 25)	(Algeria) NA Hussein Dey
30	(Algeria)	GK	Khairi Barki	12 December 1990 (aged 28)	(Algeria) WA Tlemcen
Defenders
2	(Algeria)	CB	Chouaïb Keddad	25 June 1994 (aged 25)	(Algeria) ASO Chlef
3	(Algeria)	LB	Chemseddine Nessakh (C.)	4 January 1988 (aged 31)	(Algeria) ES Sétif
4	(Algeria)	CB	Zakaria Khali	10 May 1990 (aged 29)	(Algeria) USM Bel-Abbès
6	(Algeria)	RB	Mohamed Khoutir Ziti	19 April 1990 (aged 29)	(Algeria) CA Bordj Bou Arréridj
18	(Algeria)	CB	Sofiane Bouchar	21 May 1994 (aged 25)	(Algeria) MC Oran
23	(Algeria)	RB	Zinelaabidine Boulakhoua	14 April 1990 (aged 29)	(Algeria) MC Alger
27	(Algeria)	LB	Rayen Hais Benderrouya	23 August 1997 (aged 21)	(Algeria) RC Kouba
Midfielders
7	(Algeria)	RW	Youcef Bechou	1 March 1997 (aged 22)	(Algeria) USM Alger
14	(Algeria)	AM	Larbi Tabti	23 April 1993 (aged 26)	(Algeria) USM Bel Abbès
10	(Algeria)	AM	Amir Sayoud	30 September 1990 (aged 28)	(Algeria) USM Alger
15	(Algeria)	DM	Housseyn Selmi	11 February 1993 (aged 26)	(Algeria) CA Batna
19	(Algeria)	DM	Adel Djerrar	3 March 1990 (aged 29)	(Algeria) JS Kabylie
21	(Algeria)		Samir Aiboud	11 February 1993 (aged 26)	(Algeria) ES Sétif
24	(Algeria)	DM	Bilal Tarikat	12 June 1991 (aged 28)	(Algeria) RC Boumerdès
	(Algeria)	LW	Fouad Ghanem	16 November 1997 (aged 21)	(Algeria) JSM Bejaia
	(Algeria)	DM	Toufik Zerara	3 February 1986 (aged 33)	(Algeria) CA Bordj Bou Arréridj
	(Ivory Coast)	LW	Kouame Noël N’Guessan	26 December 1996 (aged 22)	(Ivory Coast) Séwé FC
Forwards
11	(Algeria)	ST	Ahmed Gasmi	22 November 1984 (aged 34)	(Algeria) NA Hussein Dey
17	(Algeria)	LW	Khaled Bousseliou	10 December 1997 (aged 21)	(Algeria) Reserve team
20	(Algeria)	ST	Hamza Belahouel	8 June 1993 (aged 26)	(Algeria) USM Bel Abbès
9	(Algeria)	ST	Mohamed Souibaâh	25 December 1991 (aged 27)	(Algeria) ES Sétif
13	(Algeria)	ST	Islam Bendif	17 July 1992 (aged 27)	(Algeria) CRB Kaïs
25	(Niger)	ST	Boubacar Haïnikoye	10 July 1998 (aged 21)	(Ghana) Aduana Stars

== Pre-season and friendlies ==
21 January 2020 Friendly	CS Sfaxien (Tunisia)	1–1	(Algeria) CR Belouizdad	Sfax, Tunisia
14:00	Al Marzi 45' (pen.)	Report	Djerrar 61'	Stadium: Stade Taïeb Mhiri
Note: Lineup for CR Belouizdad - Merbah, Boulakhoua, Nessakh, Khali, Keddad (Bouchar), Tarikat (Djerrar), Selmi, Sayoud, Belahouel, Bechou (Zerara), Gasmi (Souibaâh)

== Competitions ==
=== Overview ===
Competition	Record								Started round	Final position / round	First match	Last match
Competition	G	W	D	L	GF	GA	GD	Win %	Started round	Final position / round	First match	Last match
Ligue 1	21	11	7	3	30	16	+14	52.38	—N/a	Winners	15 August 2019	7 March 2020
Algerian Cup	3	2	0	1	3	1	+2	66.67	Round of 64	Round of 16	28 December 2019	13 February 2020
Confederation Cup	4	2	1	1	5	2	+3	50.00	Preliminary round	First round	10 August 2019	29 September 2019
Total	28	15	8	5	38	19	+19	53.57				

Updated to match played 3 June 2019
Source: Competitions

== League table ==
Pos	Team	Pld	W	D	L	GF	GA	GD	Pts	PPG	Qualification or relegation
1	CR Belouizdad (C)	21	11	7	3	30	16	+14	40	1.90	Qualification for Champions League
2	MC Alger	21	11	4	6	31	25	+6	37	1.76	Qualification for Champions League
3	ES Sétif	22	11	4	7	34	19	+15	37	1.68	Qualification for Confederation Cup
4	JS Kabylie	22	10	6	6	27	18	+9	36	1.64	Qualification for Confederation Cup
5	CS Constantine	22	9	7	6	32	23	+9	34	1.55	

Updated to match(es) played on 15 March 2020. Source: dzfoot.com
Rules for classification: 1) points; 2) head-to-head points; 3) head-to-head goal difference; 4) goal difference; 5) total goals; 6) fairplay ranking; 7) playoff.
(C) Champions

=== Results summary ===
Overall								Home						Away					
Pld	W	D	L	GF	GA	GD	Pts	W	D	L	GF	GA	GD	W	D	L	GF	GA	GD
21	11	7	3	30	16	+14	40	8	2	0	18	6	+12	3	5	3	12	10	+2

Last updated: 22 April 2018.
Source: Competitive matches

=== Results by round ===
Round	1	2	3	4	5	6	7	8	9	10	11	12	13	14	15	16	17	18	19	20	21	22	23	24	25	26	27	28	29	30
Ground	A	H	A	H	A	H	A	A	H	A	H	A	H	A	H	H	A	H	A	H	A	H	H	A	H	A	H	A	H	A
Result	D	W	W	W	W	W	D	W	W	L	D	D	W	L	D	W	D	W	L	W	D	C	C	C	C	C	C	C	C	C
Position	7	5	5	2	1	1	1	2	2	2	1	1	1	1	1	1	1	1	1	1	1	1	1	1	1	1	1	1	1	1

Updated to match(es) played on 22 April 2019. Source: Competitive matches
A = Away; H = Home; W = Win; D = Draw; L = Loss

=== Matches ===
Win Draw Loss

15 August 2019 Round 1	CA Bordj Bou Arreridj	1–1	CR Belouizdad	Béjaïa (Note: CA Bordj Bou Arreridj played their home match against CR Belouizdad at Stade de l'Unité Maghrébine, Béjaïa, instead of their regular stadium August 20, 1955 Stadium, Bordj Bou Arréridj, due to renovation.)
20:30	Droueche 85'	Soccerway report	Selmi 18'	Stadium: Stade de l'Unité Maghrébine; Referee: Abderrezzak Arab

19 August 2019 Round 2	CR Belouizdad	2–1	NC Magra	Algiers (Note: CR Belouizdad played their home match against NC Magra at July 5, 1962 Stadium, Algiers, instead of their regular stadium Stade 20 Août 1955, Belouizdad, due to renovation.)
21:00	Khali 2'; Belahouel 30'	Soccerway report	Keddad 64' (o.g.)	Stadium: July 5, 1962 Stadium; Referee: Bilal Bendjahene

31 August 2019 Round 3	NA Hussein Dey	1–2	CR Belouizdad	Algiers (Note: NA Hussein Dey played their home match against CR Belouizdad at July 5, 1962 Stadium, Algiers, instead of their regular stadium Stade 20 Août 1955, Belouizdad, due to renovation.)
21:00	Zerdoum 18'	Soccerway report	N’Guessan 8'; Keddad 42'	Stadium: July 5, 1962 Stadium; Referee: Mustapha Ghorbal

24 September 2019 Round 5	JS Kabylie	0–3 (Note: The match was suspended at 83 minutes due to safety reasons after spectators stormed onto the pitch, CR Belouizdad award winner by 3–0.)	CR Belouizdad	Tizi Ouzou
17:45		Soccerway report	Djerrar 10'; Belahouel 74', 78'	Stadium: Stade 1er Novembre 1954; Referee: Youcef Gamouh

6 October 2019 Round 7	Paradou AC	0–0	CR Belouizdad	Algiers
17:45		Soccerway report		Stadium: July 5, 1962 Stadium; Referee: Mohamed Saïdi

12 October 2019 Round 4	CR Belouizdad	3–2	US Biskra	Belouizdad
16:00	Bechou 4'; Belahouel 18' (pen.), 82'	Soccerway report	Lakhdari 45' (pen.); Benkouider 61'	Stadium: Stade 20 Août 1955; Referee: Malek Ait Ameur

23 October 2019 Round 8	USM Bel Abbès	0–1	CR Belouizdad	Sidi Bel Abbès
18:00		Soccerway report	Bouchar 17'	Stadium: Stade 24 Fevrier 1956; Referee: Yazid Ibrir

30 October 2019 Round 9	CR Belouizdad	1–0	ES Sétif	Belouizdad
16:00	Bekakchi 90+6' (o.g.)	Soccerway report		Stadium: Stade 20 Août 1955; Referee: Nabil Boukhalfa

9 November 2019 Round 10	CS Constantine	1–0	CR Belouizdad	Constantine
17:00	Benayada 37'	Soccerway report		Stadium: Stade Mohamed Hamlaoui; Referee: Mustapha Bessiri

16 November 2019 Round 6	CR Belouizdad	1–0	ASO Chlef	Belouizdad
16:00	Sayoud 67'	Soccerway report		Stadium: Stade 20 Août 1955; Referee: Ahmed Bouzrar

23 November 2019 Round 11	CR Belouizdad	1–1	AS Aïn M'lila	Belouizdad
15:00	Khali 84'	Soccerway report	Dahar 10'	Stadium: Stade 20 Août 1955; Referee: Mustapha Ghorbal

30 November 2019 Round 12	MC Alger	2–2	CR Belouizdad	Bologhine
15:00	Khali 78' (o.g.); Nekkache 90+2'	Soccerway report	Chaâl 35' (o.g.); Sayoud 80'	Stadium: Omar Hamadi Stadium; Referee: Lahlou Benbraham

7 December 2019 Round 13	CR Belouizdad	1–0	JS Saoura	Belouizdad
15:00		Soccerway report	Sayoud 39'	Stadium: Stade 20 Août 1955; Referee: Yazid Ibrir

16 December 2019 Round 14	USM Alger	1–0	CR Belouizdad	Bologhine
18:45	Meftah 77'	Soccerway report		Stadium: Omar Hamadi Stadium; Referee: Said Aouina

21 December 2019 Round 15	CR Belouizdad	1–1	MC Oran	Belouizdad
15:00	Djerrar 2'	Soccerway report	Mansouri 85' (pen.)	Stadium: Stade 20 Août 1955; Referee: Mehdi Abid Charef

3 February 2020 Round 16	CR Belouizdad	4–0	CA Bordj Bou Arreridj	Belouizdad
16:00	Djerrar 5'; Hammouche 15' (o.g.); Belahouel 38'; Sayoud 90+1'	Soccerway report		Stadium: Stade 20 Août 1955; Referee: Youcef Gamouh

8 February 2020 Round 17	NC Magra	1–1	CR Belouizdad	Ras El Oued
15:00	Lakdja 90'	Soccerway report	Hainikoye 74'	Stadium: Stade Martyr Al Taher Qidum; Referee: Abderrezzak Arab

17 February 2020 Round 18	CR Belouizdad	1–0	NA Hussein Dey	Algiers
18:45	Bousseliou 73'	Soccerway report		Stadium: Stade du 5 Juillet; Referee: Abdelali Ibrir

22 February 2020 Round 19	US Biskra	1–0	CR Belouizdad	Biskra
15:00	Mokhtar 90+9' (pen.)	Soccerway report		Stadium: Stade du 18 Février; Referee: Nabil Boukhalfa

29 February 2020 Round 20	CR Belouizdad	3–1	JS Kabylie	Belouizdad
15:00	Belahouel 11' (pen.); Bouchar 42'; Souibaâh 45+2'	Soccerway report	Mebarki 71' (pen.)	Stadium: Stade 20 Août 1955; Referee: Youcef Gamouh

7 March 2020 Round 21	ASO Chlef	2–2	CR Belouizdad	Chlef
16:00	Benamrane 41'; Belhaoua 71'	Soccerway report	Sayoud 60'; Nessakh 63'	Stadium: Stade Mohamed Boumezrag; Attendance: 0 (close doors); Referee: Houssam Benyahia

16 March 2020 Round 22	CR Belouizdad	Cancelled	Paradou AC	Belouizdad
15:00		Soccerway report		Stadium: Stade 20 Août 1955; Attendance: 0 (close doors); Referee: Mohamed Boutaraa
Note: Match was postponed due to coronavirus pandemic.

Round 23	CR Belouizdad	Cancelled	USM Bel Abbès	Belouizdad
				Stadium: Stade 20 Août 1955

Round 24	ES Sétif	Cancelled	CR Belouizdad	Sétif
				Stadium: Stade 8 Mai 1945

Round 25	CR Belouizdad	Cancelled	CS Constantine	Belouizdad
				Stadium: Stade 20 Août 1955

Round 26	AS Aïn M'lila	Cancelled	CR Belouizdad	Aïn M'lila
				Stadium: Touhami Zoubir Khelifi Stadium

Round 27	CR Belouizdad	Cancelled	MC Alger	Belouizdad
				Stadium: Stade 20 Août 1955

Round 28	JS Saoura	Cancelled	CR Belouizdad	Béchar
				Stadium: Stade 20 Août 1955

Round 29	CR Belouizdad	Cancelled	USM Alger	Belouizdad
				Stadium: Stade 20 Août 1955

Round 30	MC Oran	Cancelled	CR Belouizdad	Oran
				Stadium: Ahmed Zabana Stadium

== Algerian Cup ==
28 December 2019 Round of 64	IS Tighennif	0–2	CR Belouizdad	Tighennif
14:00		Report	Belahouel 32'; Sayoud 70' Barki, Boulakhoua, Keddad, Bouchar, Hais Benderrouya, Selmi, Sayoud (substituted off) 85' (Tabti (substituted on) 85'), Aiboud, Belahouel (substituted off) 65' (Bechou (substituted on) 65'), Gasmi (substituted off) 75' (Soumana (substituted on) 75'), Bousseliou	Stadium: Stade Hassaïne Lakhel; Referee: Abdelmouméne Belaamri

4 January 2020 Round of 32	Olympique de Médéa	0–1	CR Belouizdad	Médéa
14:00		Report	Bouchar 72' Barki, Boulakhoua, Nessakh, Keddad, Bouchar, Tarikat, Aiboud (substituted off) 63' (Hais Benderrouya (substituted on) 63'), Selmi (substituted off) 26' (Bechou (substituted on) 26'), Sayoud (substituted off) 90+1' (Khali (substituted on) 90+1'), Djerrar, Gasmi	Stadium: Stade Imam Lyes; Referee: Mustapha Ghorbal

13 February 2020 Round of 16	US Biskra	1–0	CR Belouizdad	Biskra
15:00	Djabout 35' (pen.) Belkerrouche, Boufligha, Lakhdari, Salem, Sameur, Boukarroum, Bennai, Mokhtar, Athmani (substituted off) 90+5' (Bentayeb (substituted on) 90+5'), Bouafia (substituted off) 81' (Hamzaoui (substituted on) 81'), Djabout (substituted off) 87' (Belmabrouk (substituted on) 87')	Report	Barki, Boulakhoua, Nessakh, Bouchar, Khali, Tarikat, Selmi, Souibaâh, Tabti (substituted off) 63' (Bousseliou (substituted on) 63'), Soumana (substituted off) 78' (Gasmi (substituted on) 78'), Djerrar (substituted off) 63' (Sayoud (substituted on) 63')	Stadium: Stade du 18 Février; Referee: Farouk Mial

== Confederation Cup ==
=== Preliminary round ===
10 August 2019 First leg	CR Belouizdad (Algeria)	2–0	(Chad) AS CotonTchad	Algiers
20:45 UTC+1	Gasmi 22'; Sayoud 82'	Report		Stadium: July 5, 1962 Stadium; Referee: Moatez Ibrahim (Libya)
Note: Lineup for CR Belouizdad - Gaya, Nessakh, Bouchar, Keddad, Boulakhoua (Bechou 64'), Djarrar (Bousseliou 45'), Tariket, Selmi, Sayoud, Tabti, Gasmi (Bellahoual 74')

24 August 2019 Second leg	AS CotonTchad (Chad)	0–2	(Algeria) CR Belouizdad	N'Djamena
16:00 UTC+1		Report	Belahouel 2'; Sayoud 67'	Stadium: Stade Idriss Mahamat Ouya; Referee: Antoine Effa Essouma (Cameroon)
Note: Lineup for CR Belouizdad - Merbah - Nessakh, Bouchar, Keddad - Selmi, Djerrar, Tariket, Haïs - Sayoud (Aïboud 72’), Belahouel (Bechou 78’), Tabti (Bousseliou 83’)

=== First round ===
14 September 2019 First leg	Pyramids (Egypt)	1–1	(Algeria) CR Belouizdad	Cairo
20:00 UTC+2	Farouk 75'	Report	Sayoud 65'	Stadium: 30 June Stadium; Referee: Janny Sikazwe (Zambia)
Note: Lineup for CR Belouizdad - Gaya, Bouchar, Nessakh, Keddad, Ziti, Bousseliou (Khali 90’), Selmi, Tariket, Djerrar (Aiboud 75’), Sayoud, Belahouel (Gasmi 62’)

29 September 2019 Second leg	CR Belouizdad (Algeria)	0–1	(Egypt) Pyramids	Algiers
17:45 UTC+1		Report	Antwi 66'	Stadium: July 5, 1962 Stadium; Referee: Youssef Essrayri (Tunisia)
Note: Lineup for CR Belouizdad - Merbah - Keddad, Bouchar, Nessakh - Selmi (Bousseliou, 61'), Tariket (Khali, 80'), Djerrar; Sayoud, Ziti - Bechou (Tabti, 64'), Belahouel

== Squad information ==
=== Playing statistics ===
No.	Pos	Nat	Player	Total		Ligue 1		Algerian Cup		Confederation Cup	
No.	Pos	Nat	Player	Apps	Goals	Apps	Goals	Apps	Goals	Apps	Goals
Goalkeepers
1	GK	(Algeria) ALG	Gaya Merbah	17	0	13	0	0	0	4	0
16	GK	(Algeria) ALG	Khairi Barki	10	0	7	0	3	0	0	0
Defenders
2	DF	(Algeria) ALG	Chouaïb Keddad	20	1	14	1	2	0	4	0
3	DF	(Algeria) ALG	Chemseddine Nessakh	25	1	19	1	2	0	4	0
4	DF	(Algeria) ALG	Zakaria Khali	14	2	10	2	2	0	2	0
6	DF	(Algeria) ALG	Mohamed Khoutir Ziti	11	0	9	0	0	0	2	0
18	DF	(Algeria) ALG	Sofiane Bouchar	23	3	16	2	3	1	4	0
23	DF	(Algeria) ALG	Zinelaabidine Boulakhoua	16	0	12	0	3	0	1	0
27	DF	(Algeria) ALG	Rayen Hais Benderrouya	13	0	10	0	2	0	1	0
Midfielders
5	MF	(Algeria) ALG	Youcef Bechou	15	1	10	1	2	0	3	0
7	MF	(Algeria) ALG	Larbi Tabti	17	0	12	0	2	0	3	0
10	MF	(Algeria) ALG	Amir Sayoud	25	9	18	5	3	1	4	3
15	MF	(Algeria) ALG	Housseyn Selmi	23	1	16	1	3	0	4	0
19	MF	(Algeria) ALG	Adel Djerrar	19	2	13	2	2	0	4	0
21	MF	(Algeria) ALG	Samir Aiboud	15	0	11	0	2	0	2	0
24	MF	(Algeria) ALG	Bilal Tarikat	24	0	18	0	2	0	4	0
25	MF	(Niger) NIG	Boubacar Haïnikoye	5	1	3	1	2	0	0	0
	MF	(Algeria) ALG	Fouad Ghanem	2	0	2	0	0	0	0	0
	MF	(Algeria) ALG	Toufik Zerara	3	0	3	0	0	0	0	0
Forwards
11	FW	(Algeria) ALG	Ahmed Gasmi	16	1	11	0	3	0	2	1
17	FW	(Algeria) ALG	Khaled Bousseliou	23	1	17	1	2	0	4	0
20	FW	(Algeria) ALG	Hamza Belahouel	20	6	15	4	1	1	4	1
	MF	(Algeria) ALG	Mohamed Souibaâh	7	1	6	1	1	0	0	0
	FW	(Algeria) ALG	Islam Bendif	2	0	2	0	0	0	0	0
Players transferred out during the season
14	MF	(Ivory Coast) CIV	Kouame Noël N’Guessan	8	1	8	1	0	0	0	0

Last updated: 1 June 2018
Source: fr.soccerway.com

=== Goalscorers ===
Includes all competitive matches. The list is sorted alphabetically by surname when total goals are equal.

No.	Nat.	Player	Pos.	L 1	AC	CC 3	TOTAL
10	(Algeria)	Amir Sayoud	MF	5	1	3	9
20	(Algeria)	Hamza Belahouel	FW	4	1	1	6
18	(Algeria)	Sofiane Bouchar	DF	2	1	0	3
4	(Algeria)	Zakaria Khali	DF	2	0	0	2
19	(Algeria)	Adel Djerrar	MF	2	0	0	2
2	(Algeria)	Chouaïb Keddad	DF	1	0	0	1
3	(Algeria)	Chemseddine Nessakh	DF	1	0	0	1
5	(Algeria)	Youcef Bechou	MF	1	0	0	1
15	(Algeria)	Housseyn Selmi	MF	1	0	0	1
25	(Niger)	Boubacar Haïnikoye	MF	1	0	0	1
14	(Ivory Coast)	Kouame Noël N’Guessan	MF	1	0	0	1
17	(Algeria)	Khaled Bousseliou	FW	1	0	0	1
	(Algeria)	Mohamed Souibaâh	FW	1	0	0	1
11	(Algeria)	Ahmed Gasmi	FW	0	0	1	1
Own Goals				0	0	0	0
Totals				30	3	5	38

== Transfers ==
=== In ===
Date	Pos	Player	from club	Transfer fee	Source
1 July 2019	DF	(Algeria) Zakaria Khali	USM Bel Abbès	Free transfer	
2 July 2019	DF	(Algeria) Mohamed Khoutir Ziti	CA Bordj Bou Arreridj	Free transfer	
4 July 2019	FW	(Algeria) Ahmed Gasmi	NA Hussein Dey	Free transfer	
6 July 2019	MF	(Algeria) Larbi Tabti	USM Bel Abbès	Free transfer	
19 July 2019	GK	(Algeria) Gaya Merbah	NA Hussein Dey	Undisclosed	
19 July 2019	MF	(Ivory Coast) Kouame Noel N'Guessan	(Ivory Coast) Séwé Sports	Free transfer	
2 August 2019	FW	(Algeria) Islam Bendif	CRB Kais	Free transfer	
6 January 2020	FW	(Algeria) Mohamed Souibaâh	ES Sétif	Free transfer (Released)	
7 January 2020	MF	(Algeria) Toufik Zerara	CA Bordj Bou Arreridj	Free transfer	
21 January 2020	FW	(Algeria) Fouad Ghanem	JSM Béjaïa	5,000,000 DA	

=== Out ===
Date	Pos	Player	To club	Transfer fee	Source
25 June 2019	FW	(Algeria) Mohamed Herida	Unattached	Free transfer (Released)	
4 July 2019	DF	(Algeria) Meziane Zeroual	CA Bordj Bou Arreridj	Free transfer (Released)	
6 July 2019	GK	(Algeria) Cédric Si Mohamed	CA Bordj Bou Arreridj	Free transfer	
6 July 2019	FW	(Algeria) Mohamed Attia	(Tunisia) AS Soliman	Free transfer (Released)	,
7 July 2019	GK	(Algeria) Lyes Meziane	CS Constantine	Free transfer (Released)	
10 July 2019	FW	(Algeria) Abou Sofiane Balegh	CS Constantine	Free transfer (Released)	
20 July 2019	FW	(Algeria) Djamel Chettal	(Tunisia) CA Bizertin	Free transfer (Released)	
24 July 2019	MF	(Algeria) Djamel Rabti	MO Béjaïa	Free transfer (Released)	
