= 2021–22 CR Belouizdad season =

CR Belouizdad
2021–22 season
- Owner: Madar Holding
- President: Mohamed Abrouk (until 22 September 2021); Mohamed Belhadj (from 22 September 2021)
- Head coach: Marcos Paquetá (from 23 September 2021)
- Stadium: Stade 20 Août 1955
- Ligue 1: 1st
- Champions League: Quarter-finals
- Top goalscorer: League: Kheireddine Merzougui (11 goals); All: Kheireddine Merzougui (14 goals)
Home colours	Away colours

In the 2021–22 season, CR Belouizdad competed in the Ligue 1 for the 56th season, as well as the Algerian Cup. It was their 33rd consecutive season in the top flight of Algerian football. They competed in Ligue 1 and the Champions League.

== Squad list ==
Players and squad numbers last updated on 20 October 2021.
Note: Flags indicate national team as has been defined under FIFA eligibility rules. Players may hold more than one non-FIFA nationality.

No.	Nat.	Position	Name	Date of birth (age)	Signed from
Goalkeepers
1	(Algeria)	GK	Gaya Merbah	22 July 1994 (aged 27)	(Algeria) NA Hussein Dey
16	(Algeria)	GK	Toufik Moussaoui	20 April 1991 (aged 30)	(Algeria) Paradou AC
26	(Algeria)	GK	Ahmed Abdelkader	19 February 1999 (aged 22)	(Algeria) Unattached
Defenders
2	(Algeria)	CB	Chouaib Keddad	25 July 1994 (aged 27)	(Algeria) ASO Chlef
3	(Algeria)	LB	Chemseddine Nessakh	4 January 1988 (aged 33)	(Algeria) ES Sétif
12	(Algeria)	CB	Ahmed Ait Abdessalem	30 August 1997 (aged 24)	(Algeria) JS Kabylie
18	(Algeria)	CB	Sofiane Bouchar	21 May 1994 (aged 27)	(Algeria) MC Oran
22	(Algeria)	RB	Mokhtar Belkhiter	15 January 1992 (aged 29)	(Tunisia) Club Africain
23	(Algeria)	RB	Zinelaabidine Boulakhoua	15 April 1990 (aged 31)	(Algeria) MC Alger
25	(Algeria)	LB	Sabri Cheraitia	23 March 1996 (aged 25)	(Algeria) Paradou AC
27	(Algeria)	LB	Rayen Hais Benderrouya	23 August 1997 (aged 24)	(Algeria) RC Kouba
Midfielders
5	(Algeria)	MF	Larbi Tabti	23 April 1993 (aged 28)	(Algeria) USM Bel Abbès
6	(Algeria)	MF	Zakaria Draoui	12 February 1994 (aged 27)	(Algeria) ES Sétif
7	(Algeria)	MF	Najib Ammari	10 April 1992 (aged 29)	(Italy) Viterbese
8	(Algeria)	MF	Mohamed Islam Bakir	13 July 1996 (aged 25)	(Tunisia) CS Sfaxien
10	(Algeria)	MF	Abderrahmane Bourdim	14 June 1994 (aged 27)	(Algeria) MC Alger
15	(Algeria)	MF	Housseyn Selmi	11 February 1993 (aged 28)	(Algeria) CA Batna
19	(Algeria)	MF	Adel Djerrar	3 March 1990 (aged 31)	(Algeria) JS Kabylie
24	(Algeria)	MF	Bilal Tarikat	12 June 1991 (aged 30)	(Algeria) RC Boumerdès
Forwards
9	(Algeria)	FW	Mohamed Souibaâh	25 December 1991 (aged 30)	(Algeria) ES Sétif
11	(Libya)	FW	Anas Al-Mosarati	19 October 1994 (aged 27)	(Libya) Al-Hilal
13	(Algeria)	FW	Kheireddine Merzougui	16 August 1992 (aged 29)	(Algeria) JSM Skikda
14	(Algeria)	FW	Hicham Khalfallah	2 October 1991 (aged 30)	(Algeria) Olympique de Médéa
17	(Algeria)	FW	Khaled Bousseliou	3 July 1997 (aged 24)	(Algeria) Youth system
20	(Algeria)	FW	Bouzid Dadache	27 September 1993 (aged 28)	(Algeria) Olympique de Médéa
21	(Algeria)	FW	Mahi Benhamou	November 12, 1995 (aged 26)	(Algeria) MC Oran

== Competitions ==
=== Overview ===
Competition	Record								Started round	Final position / round	First match	Last match
Competition	G	W	D	L	GF	GA	GD	Win %	Started round	Final position / round	First match	Last match
Ligue 1	34	21	7	6	54	22	+32	61.76	—N/a	Winners	29 October 2021	11 June 2022
Champions League	12	5	3	4	15	10	+5	41.67	Preliminary round	Quarter-finals	12 September 2021	23 April 2022
Total	46	26	10	10	69	32	+37	56.52				

Updated to match played 11 June 2022
Source: Competitions

== League table ==
Pos	Team	Pld	W	D	L	GF	GA	GD	Pts	Qualification or relegation
1	CR Belouizdad (C)	34	21	7	6	54	22	+32	70	Qualification for CAF Champions League
2	JS Kabylie	34	16	13	5	40	20	+20	61	Qualification for CAF Champions League
3	JS Saoura	34	17	9	8	59	23	+36	60	Qualification for CAF Confederation Cup
4	USM Alger	34	15	12	7	45	22	+23	57	Qualification for CAF Confederation Cup
5	CS Constantine	34	15	10	9	46	29	+17	55	

Updated to match(es) played on 17 June 2022. Source: the-sports.org
Rules for classification: 1) points; 2) head-to-head points; 3) head-to-head goal difference; 4) goal difference; 5) total goals; 6) fairplay ranking; 7) playoff.
(C) Champions

=== Results summary ===
Overall								Home						Away					
Pld	W	D	L	GF	GA	GD	Pts	W	D	L	GF	GA	GD	W	D	L	GF	GA	GD
34	21	7	6	54	22	+32	70	12	2	3	25	8	+17	9	5	3	29	14	+15

Last updated: 11 June 2022.
Source: Competitive matches

=== Results by round ===
Round	1	2	3	4	5	6	7	8	9	10	11	12	13	14	15	16	17	18	19	20	21	22	23	24	25	26	27	28	29	30	31	32	33	34
Ground	A	H	A	H	A	H	A	H	A	H	A	H	A	H	H	A	H	H	A	H	A	H	A	H	A	H	A	H	A	H	A	A	H	A
Result	L	D	W	W	D	W	W	W	W	W	D	L	W	W	W	L	W	W	W	W	D	W	W	D	W	W	L	L	D	W	D	W	L	W
Position	12	13	9	6	8	7	4	2	1	1	2	3	1	1	1	1	1	1	1	1	1	1	1	1	1	1	1	1	1	1	1	1	1	1

Updated to match(es) played on 11 June 2022. Source: Competitive matches
A = Away; H = Home; W = Win; D = Draw; L = Loss

=== Matches ===
The league fixtures were announced on 7 October 2021.

29 October 2021 Round 2	CR Belouizdad	1–1	CS Constantine	Belouizdad
15:00	Merzougui 85'	Report	Koukpo 18'	Stadium: Stade 20 Août 1955; Attendance: 0 (close doors); Referee: Bilal Bendjahene

2 November 2021 Round 1	MC Alger	2–1	CR Belouizdad	Algiers
15:00	Zaidi 13'; Morsli 30'	Report	Merzougui 43' (pen.)	Stadium: Stade du 5 Juillet; Referee: Mehdi Abid Charef

7 November 2021 Round 3	Paradou AC	1–3	CR Belouizdad	Dar El Beïda
15:00	Benbouali 80'	Report	Bousseliou 27'; Hamad 60'; Ait Abdessalem 70'	Stadium: Omar Benrabah Stadium; Referee: Malek Ait Ameur

20 November 2021 Round 4	CR Belouizdad	2–1	Olympique de Médéa	Belouizdad
14:30	Bouchar 17'; Bakir 21' (pen.)	Report	Berbache 83' (pen.)	Stadium: Stade 20 Août 1955; Referee: Houssam Benyahia

25 November 2021 Round 5	ES Sétif	2–2	CR Belouizdad	Sétif
17:00	Deghmoum 54'; Bodabous 88' (pen.)	Report	Bakir 38'; Benhamou 42'	Stadium: Stade 8 Mai 1945; Attendance: 0 (close doors); Referee: Mustapha Ghorbal

4 December 2021 Round 6	CR Belouizdad	1–0	NA Hussein Dey	Belouizdad
14:30	Nessakh 62'	Report		Stadium: Stade 20 Août 1955; Attendance: 0 (close doors); Referee: Lahlou Benbraham

10 December 2021 Round 7	RC Arbaâ	1–2	CR Belouizdad	Boufarik
15:00	Kessili 15'	Report	Belkhiter 6'; Merzougui 90+5'	Stadium: Stade Mohamed Reggaz; Referee: Abdelmoumen Touabti

18 December 2021 Round 8	CR Belouizdad	1–0	JS Saoura	Belouizdad
13:00	Selmi 55'	Report		Stadium: Stade 20 Août 1955; Attendance: 0 (close doors); Referee: Mehdi Abid Charef

24 December 2022 Round 9	US Biskra	0–1	CR Belouizdad	Biskra
15:00		Report	Keddad 45+4'	Stadium: Stade du 18 Février; Referee: Abdellah Benchehida

28 December 2021 Round 10	CR Belouizdad	1–0	USM Alger	Belouizdad
14:30	Bouchar (yellow card) 49'; Bourdim 80'	Report	Benkhelifa (yellow card) 15'; Zouari (penalty missed) 48'	Stadium: Stade 20 Août 1955; Attendance: 0 (close doors); Referee: Youcef Gamouh

2 January 2022 Round 11	HB Chelghoum Laïd	0–0	CR Belouizdad	Chelghoum Laïd
14:00	Haddad (yellow card) 23'; Cheurfaoui (yellow card) 85'	Report	Ait Abdesslem (yellow card) 35'	Stadium: 11 December 1961 Stadium; Referee: Nabil Boukhalfa

7 January 2022 Round 12	CR Belouizdad	0–1	JS Kabylie	Belouizdad
15:00	Belaribi (yellow card) 22'; Mrezigue (yellow card) 38'; Belkhiter (yellow card) 78'; Bouchar (yellow card) 84'	Report	Bouhakak (yellow card) 32'; Nezla 55'; Bensayah (yellow card) 78'; Oukaci (yellow card) 81'; Doukha (yellow card) 84'	Stadium: Stade 20 Août 1955; Attendance: 0 (close doors); Referee: Abdelali Ibrir

16 January 2022 Round 13	ASO Chlef	1–2	CR Belouizdad	Chlef
15:00	Alili 90+4' (pen.)	Report	Bourdim 62'; Merzougui 68'	Stadium: Stade Mohamed Boumezrag; Referee: Abdelmoumen Touabti

21 January 2022 Round 14	CR Belouizdad	3–0	MC Oran	Belouizdad
15:00	Bourdim 30'; Dadache 71'; Khalfallah 88'	Report		Stadium: Stade 20 Août 1955; Attendance: 0 (close doors); Referee: Said Aouina

25 January 2022 Round 15	CR Belouizdad	2–0	RC Relizane	Belouizdad
15:00	Dadache 88' (pen.); Khalfallah 90'	Report		Stadium: Stade 20 Août 1955; Attendance: 0 (close doors); Referee: Akram Mechairia

29 January 2022 Round 16	NC Magra	1–0	CR Belouizdad	Magra
14:30	Ziouache 51'	Report		Stadium: Boucheligue Brothers Stadium; Referee: Mohamed Saïdi

5 February 2022 Round 17	CR Belouizdad	3–0	WA Tlemcen	Belouizdad
14:30	Merzougui 21'; Khalfallah 45'; Tabti 57'	Report		Stadium: Stade 20 Août 1955; Attendance: 0 (close doors); Referee: Nadjib Meziani

23 March 2022 Round 18	CR Belouizdad	1–0	MC Alger	Belouizdad
14:30	Keddad 86'	Report		Stadium: Stade 20 Août 1955; Attendance: 0 (close doors); Referee: Lahlou Benbraham

3 March 2022 Round 19	CS Constantine	1–2	CR Belouizdad	Constantine
14:30	Aiboud 14'	Report	Merzougui 73'; Belkhiter 90+8' (pen.)	Stadium: Stade Ramdane Benabdelmalek; Referee: Mohamed Saïdi

7 March 2022 Round 20	CR Belouizdad	2–0	Paradou AC	Belouizdad
14:30	Bouguerra 80' (o.g.); Merzougui 90+1'	Report		Stadium: Stade 20 Août 1955; Attendance: 0 (close doors); Referee: Houssam Benyahia

27 March 2022 Round 23	NA Hussein Dey	3–5	CR Belouizdad	Belouizdad
16:00	Bekkouche 15'; Benayad 45+2', 90'	Report	Merzougui 40'; Bousseliou 64'; Aribi 77', 85', 88'	Stadium: Stade 20 Août 1955; Attendance: 0 (close doors); Referee: Mehdi Abid Charef

7 April 2022 Round 21	Olympique de Médéa	0–0	CR Belouizdad	Médéa
16:45		Report		Stadium: Stade Imam Lyes; Referee: Abdelmoumen Touabti

12 April 2022 Round 25	JS Saoura	0–1	CR Belouizdad	Béchar
22:00		Report	Bouras 90'	Stadium: Stade 20 Août 1955; Referee: Nabil Boukhalfa

29 April 2022 Round 28	CR Belouizdad	0–1	HB Chelghoum Laïd	Belouizdad
16:45		Report	Harrari 12'	Stadium: Stade 20 Août 1955; Attendance: 0 (close doors); Referee: Ali Nader

6 May 2022 Round 29	JS Kabylie	0–0	CR Belouizdad	Tizi Ouzou
18:45		Report		Stadium: Stade 1er Novembre 1954; Referee: Houssam Benyahia

10 May 2022 Round 24	CR Belouizdad	1–1	RC Arbaâ	Belouizdad
17:00	Bourdim 70'	Report	Saidani 50'	Stadium: Stade 20 Août 1955; Attendance: 0 (close doors); Referee: Abderrezzak Arab

14 May 2022 Round 30	CR Belouizdad	3–1	ASO Chlef	Belouizdad
17:00	Belkhir 14' (pen.); Boulakhoua 40', 57'	Report	Souibaâh 22'	Stadium: Stade 20 Août 1955; Attendance: 0 (close doors); Referee: Said Aouina

18 May 2022 Round 22	CR Belouizdad	1–0	ES Sétif	Belouizdad
17:00	Bourdim 90+5'	Report		Stadium: Stade 20 Août 1955; Attendance: 0 (close doors); Referee: Mohamed Boutaraa

22 May 2022 Round 31	MC Oran	0–0	CR Belouizdad	Oran
17:00		Report		Stadium: Ahmed Zabana Stadium; Referee: Mehdi Abid Charef

27 May 2022 Round 32	RC Relizane	0–8	CR Belouizdad	Relizane
17:45		Report	Bousseliou 6', 30'; Merzougui 12', 40'; Bourdim 53'; Bouchar 55'; Belkhiter 79', 84'	Stadium: Stade Tahar Zoughari; Referee: Zine El Abidine Dekhane

31 May 2022 Round 26	CR Belouizdad	2–0	US Biskra	Belouizdad
16:45	Mrezigue 31'; Bousseliou 45'	Report		Stadium: Stade 20 Août 1955; Attendance: 0 (close doors); Referee: Youcef Taieb Bouderbal

3 June 2022 Round 33	CR Belouizdad	1–2	NC Magra	Belouizdad
16:45	Merzougui 29'	Report	Kibboua 11', 25'	Stadium: Stade 20 Août 1955; Attendance: 0 (close doors); Referee: Akram Mechairia

8 June 2022 Round 27	USM Alger	2–0	CR Belouizdad	Bologhine
18:45	Belkacemi 78'; Mahious 90+2'	Report		Stadium: Omar Hamadi Stadium; Attendance: 0 (close doors); Referee: Lotfi Bekouassa

11 June 2022 Round 34	WA Tlemcen	0–2	CR Belouizdad	Tlemcen
16:45		Report	Selmi 63'; Belkhadem 90+1'	Stadium: Stade Akid Lotfi; Referee: Boubekeur Zouaoui

== Champions League ==
=== Qualifying rounds ===
==== First round ====
12 September 2021 First leg	Akwa United (Nigeria)	1–0	(Algeria) CR Belouizdad	Uyo
15:00 UTC+1	Friday 87'	Report		Stadium: Godswill Akpabio International Stadium; Referee: Clement franklin Kpan (Ivory Coast)

19 September 2021 Second leg	CR Belouizdad (Algeria)	2–0 (2–1 agg.)	(Nigeria) Akwa United	Algiers
21:00 UTC+1	Khalfallah 71'; Nessakh 84' (pen.)	Report		Stadium: Omar Hamadi Stadium; Referee: Shuhoub Abdulbasit (Libya)

==== Second round ====
16 October 2021 First leg	ASEC Mimosas (Ivory Coast)	3–1	(Algeria) CR Belouizdad	Abidjan
15:00 UTC+0	Konaté 12', 50'; Pokou 63'	Report	Bouchar 4'	Stadium: Stade Robert Champroux; Referee: Souleiman Ahmed Djama (Djibouti)

24 October 2021 Second leg	CR Belouizdad (Algeria)	2–0 (3–3 agg.)	(Ivory Coast) ASEC Mimosas	Algiers
19:00 UTC+1	Keddad 2'; Bousseliou 48'	Report		Stadium: Omar Hamadi Stadium; Referee: Youssef Sraïri (Tunisia)

=== Group stage ===
==== Group C ====
Pos	Team	Pld	W	D	L	GF	GA	GD	Pts	Qualification	EST	CRB	ESS	GAL
1	(Tunisia) Espérance de Tunis	6	4	2	0	12	2	+10	14	Advance to knockout stage	—	2–1	0–0	4–0
2	(Algeria) CR Belouizdad	6	3	2	1	10	5	+5	11	Advance to knockout stage	1–1	—	2–0	4–1
3	(Tunisia) Étoile du Sahel	6	1	3	2	4	7	−3	6		0–2	0–0	—	3–2
4	(Botswana) Jwaneng Galaxy	6	0	1	5	5	17	−12	1		0–3	1–2	1–1	—

Source: CAF

11 February 2022 Matchday 1	Étoile du Sahel (Tunisia)	0–0	(Algeria) CR Belouizdad	Tunis (Note: Étoile du Sahel play their home matches at Stade Hammadi Agrebi, Tunis, instead of their regular home stadium Stade Olympique de Sousse, Sousse, which is undergoing renovation.)
17:00 UTC+1		Report		Stadium: Stade Hammadi Agrebi; Referee: Ibrahim Nour El Din (Egypt)

19 February 2022 Matchday 2	CR Belouizdad (Algeria)	1–1	(Tunisia) Espérance de Tunis	Algiers (Note: CR Belouizdad play their group stage home matches at Stade du 5 Juillet, Algiers, instead of their regular home stadium Stade du 20 Août, Algiers, which did not meet CAF requirements.)
20:00 UTC+1	Aribi 15' (pen.)	Report	Machmoum 82'	Stadium: Stade du 5 Juillet; Referee: Mohamed Adel (Egypt)

26 February 2022 Matchday 3	Jwaneng Galaxy (Botswana)	1–2	(Algeria) CR Belouizdad	Gaborone
18:00 UTC+2	Baruti 84'	Report	Merzougui 77', 90+3'	Stadium: Botswana National Stadium; Referee: Blaise Yuven Ngwa (Cameroon)

11 March 2022 Matchday 4	CR Belouizdad (Algeria)	4–1	(Botswana) Jwaneng Galaxy	Algiers
20:00 UTC+1	Bakir 25' (pen.); Aribi 41'; Selmi 70'; Merzougui 90+1'	Report	Sesinyi 49'	Stadium: Stade du 5 Juillet; Referee: Sabri Mohamed Fadul (Sudan)

19 March 2022 Matchday 5	CR Belouizdad (Algeria)	2–0	(Tunisia) Étoile du Sahel	Algiers
20:00 UTC+1	Bouchar 3'; Belkhir 18'	Report		Stadium: Stade du 5 Juillet; Referee: Redouane Jiyed (Morocco)

2 April 2022 Matchday 6	Espérance de Tunis (Tunisia)	2–1	(Algeria) CR Belouizdad	Tunis
22:00 UTC+1	Ben Hamida 13'; Iwuala 17'	Report	Mrezigue 2'	Stadium: Stade Hammadi Agrebi; Referee: Abdel Aziz Mohamed Bouh (Mauritania)

==== Knockout stage ====
===== Quarter-finals =====
16 April 2022 First leg	CR Belouizdad (Algeria)	0–1	(Morocco) Wydad AC	Algiers
22:00 UTC+1		Report	Mbenza 46'	Stadium: Stade du 5 Juillet; Referee: Pacifique Ndabihawenimana (Burundi)

23 April 2022 Second leg	Wydad AC (Morocco)	0–0 (1–0 agg.)	(Algeria) CR Belouizdad	Casablanca
22:00 UTC+0		Report		Stadium: Stade Mohammed V Referee: Amin Omar (Egypt)

== Squad information ==
=== Playing statistics ===
No.	Pos	Nat	Player	Total		Ligue 1		Champions League	
No.	Pos	Nat	Player	Apps	Goals	Apps	Goals	Apps	Goals
16	GK	(Algeria) ALG	Toufik Moussaoui	30	0	27	0	3	0
26	GK	(Algeria) ALG	Ahmed Abdelkader	11	0	6	0	5	0
2	DF	(Algeria) ALG	Chouaib Keddad	35	3	23	2	12	1
3	DF	(Algeria) ALG	Chemseddine Nessakh	34	2	24	1	10	1
12	DF	(Algeria) ALG	Ahmed Ait Abdessalem	29	1	24	1	5	0
18	DF	(Algeria) ALG	Sofiane Bouchar	37	4	26	2	11	2
22	DF	(Algeria) ALG	Mokhtar Belkhiter	39	3	28	3	11	0
23	DF	(Algeria) ALG	Zinelaabidine Boulakhoua	23	2	19	2	4	0
27	DF	(Algeria) ALG	Rayen Hais Benderrouya	0	0	0	0	0	0
5	MF	(Algeria) ALG	Larbi Tabti	28	1	20	1	8	0
6	MF	(Algeria) ALG	Zakaria Draoui	32	0	21	0	11	0
7	MF	(Algeria) ALG	Najib Ammari	0	0	0	0	0	0
8	MF	(Algeria) ALG	Mohamed Islam Bakir	38	3	28	2	10	1
10	MF	(Algeria) ALG	Abderrahmane Bourdim	25	6	24	6	1	0
15	MF	(Algeria) ALG	Housseyn Selmi	38	3	27	2	11	1
19	MF	(Algeria) ALG	Adel Djerrar	27	0	22	0	5	0
24	MF	(Algeria) ALG	Bilal Tarikat	13	0	10	0	3	0
29	MF	(Algeria) ALG	Houssem Eddine Mrezigue	33	2	22	1	11	1
38	MF	(Algeria) ALG	Akram Bouras	21	1	16	1	5	0
9	FW	(Algeria) ALG	Karim Aribi	22	5	14	3	8	2
13	FW	(Algeria) ALG	Kheireddine Merzougui	40	14	30	11	10	3
14	FW	(Algeria) ALG	Hicham Khalfallah	27	4	18	3	9	1
17	FW	(Algeria) ALG	Khaled Bousseliou	29	6	19	5	10	1
20	FW	(Algeria) ALG	Bouzid Dadache	11	2	10	2	1	0
28	FW	(Algeria) ALG	Mohamed Islam Belkhir	25	3	16	2	9	1
36	FW	(Algeria) ALG	Chems Eddine Bekkouche	1	0	0	0	1	0
Players transferred out during the season
1	GK	(Algeria) ALG	Gaya Merbah	6	0	2	0	4	0
11	GK	(Libya) LBA	Anis Al-Mosarati	10	1	10	1	0	0

Last updated: 11 June 2022
Source: fr.soccerway.com

=== Goalscorers ===
Includes all competitive matches. The list is sorted alphabetically by surname when total goals are equal.

No.	Nat.	Player	Pos.	L 1	CL 1	TOTAL
13	(Algeria)	Kheireddine Merzougui	FW	11	3	14
10	(Algeria)	Abderrahmane Bourdim	MF	6	0	6
17	(Algeria)	Khaled Bousseliou	FW	5	1	6
9	(Algeria)	Karim Aribi	FW	3	2	5
14	(Algeria)	Hicham Khalfallah	MF	3	1	4
18	(Algeria)	Sofiane Bouchar	DF	2	2	4
28	(Algeria)	Mohamed Islam Belkhir	FW	2	1	3
8	(Algeria)	Mohamed Islam Bakir	MF	2	1	3
2	(Algeria)	Chouaib Keddad	DF	2	1	3
15	(Algeria)	Housseyn Selmi	MF	2	1	3
25	(Algeria)	Mokhtar Belkhiter	DF	3	0	3
3	(Algeria)	Chemseddine Nessakh	DF	1	1	2
23	(Algeria)	Zinelaabidine Boulakhoua	DF	2	0	2
20	(Algeria)	Bouzid Dadache	FW	2	0	2
29	(Algeria)	Houssem Eddine Mrezigue	FW	1	1	2
12	(Algeria)	Ahmed Ait Abdessalem	DF	1	0	1
11	(Libya)	Anis Al-Mosarati	FW	1	0	1
21	(Algeria)	Mahi Benhamou	FW	1	0	1
5	(Algeria)	Larbi Tabti	MF	1	0	1
38	(Algeria)	Akram Bouras	MF	1	0	1
	(Algeria)	Mohammed fodil Belkhadem	MF	1	0	1
Own Goals				1	0	1
Totals				54	15	69

== Transfers ==
=== In ===
Date	Pos	Player	From club	Transfer fee	Source
18 August 2021	CB	(Algeria) Ahmed Ait Abdessalem	JS Kabylie	Free transfer	
18 August 2021	DF	(Algeria) Sabri Cheraitia	Paradou AC	Free transfer	
5 September 2021	LW	(Algeria) Mahi Benhamou	MC Oran	Free transfer	
16 September 2021	LW	(Libya) Anis Al-Mosarati	(Libya) Al-Hilal	Free transfer	
20 October 2021	FW	(Algeria) Bouzid Dadache	Olympique de Médéa	Free transfer	
20 October 2021	MF	(Algeria) Abderrahmane Bourdim	MC Alger	Free transfer	
20 October 2021	MF	(Algeria) Najib Ammari	(Italy) Viterbese	Free transfer	
31 January 2022	FW	(Republic of Ireland) Ali Reghba	(England) Leicester City reserves	Free transfer	
31 January 2022	FW	(Algeria) Karim Aribi	(France) Nîmes Olympique	Free transfer	

=== Out ===
Date	Pos	Player	To club	Transfer fee	Source
18 August 2021	FW	(Algeria) Hamza Belahouel	CS Constantine	Free transfer	
26 August 2021	MF	(Algeria) Amir Sayoud	(Saudi Arabia) Al-Tai FC	Free transfer	
27 August 2021	ST	(Benin) Marcellin Koukpo	Unattached (Note: Koukpo joined CS Constantine on 2 September 2021.)	Free transfer (Released)	
28 August 2021	FW	(Algeria) Mohamed Souibaâh	Unattached	Free transfer (Released)	
4 September 2021	CM	(Algeria) Samir Aiboud	CS Constantine	Free transfer	
21 September 2021	CM	(Algeria) Zakaria Khali	MC Oran	Free transfer	
28 September 2021	MF	(Algeria) Youcef Bechou	Olympique de Médéa	One-year loan	
30 January 2022	GK	(Algeria) Gaya Merbah	(Morocco) Raja CA	Free transfer	
8 February 2022	FW	(Libya) Anis Al-Mosarati	(Libya) Al-Ittihad	Free transfer	

== New contracts ==
No.	Pos	Player	Contract length	Contract end	Date	Source
3	LB	(Algeria) Chemseddine Nessakh	1 year	2022	14 August 2021	
5	AM	(Algeria) Larbi Tabti	1 year	2022	15 August 2021	
