= 2018–19 MC Oran season =

MC Oran
2018–19 season
- Chairman: Ahmed "Baba" Belhadj
- Head coach: Badou Zaki (from 19 May 2018) (until 22 September 2018); Omar Belatoui (from 14 October 2018)
- Stadium: Stade Ahmed Zabana
- Ligue 1: 10th
- Algerian Cup: Quarter-finals
- Top goalscorer: League: Rachid Nadji (8 goals); All: Rachid Nadji (9 goals)
Home colours	Away colours	Third colours

In the 2018–19 season, MC Oran competed in the Ligue 1 for the 52nd season, as well as the Algerian Cup.

== Competitions ==
=== Overview ===
Competition	Record								Started round	Final position / round	First match	Last match
Competition	G	W	D	L	GF	GA	GD	Win %	Started round	Final position / round	First match	Last match
Ligue 1	30	8	12	10	33	38	−5	26.67	—N/a	10th	11 August 2018	26 May 2019
Algerian Cup	5	3	2	0	9	5	+4	60.00	Round of 64	Quarter-final	18 December 2018	28 March 2019
Total	35	11	14	10	42	43	−1	31.43				

Updated to match played 3 June 2019
Source: Competitions

== Ligue 1 ==
=== League table ===
Pos	Team	Pld	W	D	L	GF	GA	GD	Pts	Qualification or relegation
8	CR Belouizdad	30	10	11	9	28	27	+1	38 (Note: CR Belouizdad were deducted 3 points.)	Qualification for Confederation Cup (Note: CR Belouizdad are Algerian Cup winners.)
9	CA Bordj Bou Arreridj	30	9	10	11	22	24	−2	37	
10	MC Oran	30	8	12	10	33	38	−5	36 (Note: Head-to-head: MC Oran 7 points; NA Hussein Dey 5 points; AS Aïn M'lila 3 points.)	
11	NA Hussein Dey	30	9	9	12	22	29	−7	36	
12	AS Aïn M'lila	30	7	15	8	20	30	−10	36	

Source: DZFoot
Rules for classification: 1) points; 2) head-to-head points; 3) head-to-head goal difference; 4) goal difference; 5) total goals; 6) fairplay ranking; 7) playoff.

=== Results summary ===
Overall								Home						Away					
Pld	W	D	L	GF	GA	GD	Pts	W	D	L	GF	GA	GD	W	D	L	GF	GA	GD
0	0	0	0	0	0	0	0	0	0	0	0	0	0	0	0	0	0	0	0

Last updated: 22 April 2018.
Source: Competitive matches

=== Results by round ===
Round	1	2	3	4	5	6	7	8	9	10	11	12	13	14	15	16	17	18	19	20	21	22	23	24	25	26	27	28	29	30
Ground																														
Result																														
Position																														

Updated to match(es) played on 22 April 2019. Source: Competitive matches
A = Away; H = Home; W = Win; D = Draw; L = Loss

=== Matches ===
Win Draw Loss

11 August 2018 Round 1	MC Oran	1–1	CA Bordj Bou Arreridj	Oran
21:00	Nadji 59' (pen.)	Soccerway report	Meftahi 1'	Stadium: Ahmed Zabana Stadium; Referee: Abderrezzak Arab

17 August 2018 Round 2	JS Saoura	2–0	MC Oran	Béchar
20:00	Boulaouidet 57' (pen.), 85'	Soccerway report		Stadium: Stade 20 Août 1955; Referee: Farouk Mial

28 August 2018 Round 3	MC Oran	0–0	MO Béjaïa	Oran
19:00		Soccerway report		Stadium: Ahmed Zabana Stadium; Referee: Hamza Bouslimani

1 September 2018 Round 4	USM Bel Abbès	3–1	MC Oran	Sidi Bel Abbès
17:45	Guebli 17'; Aït Fergane 25'; Zouari 60'	Soccerway report	Nadji 62'	Stadium: Stade 24 Fevrier 1956; Referee: Mehdi Abid Charef

10 September 2018 Round 5	MC Oran	3–1	AS Ain M'lila	Oran
19:00	Hammar 22'; Sebbah 43'; Chibane 89'	Soccerway report	Si Ammar 85'	Stadium: Ahmed Zabana Stadium; Referee: Merzoug Brahimi

15 September 2018 Round 6	Paradou AC	3–2	MC Oran	Bologhine
19:00	Naidji 50', 70'; Bouzok 70' (pen.)	Soccerway report	Mekkaoui 19'; Mansouri 22' (pen.)	Stadium: Omar Hamadi Stadium; Referee: Ahmed Bouzrar

22 September 2018 Round 7	MC Oran	4–3	MC Alger	Oran
19:00	Hammar 2'; Mansouri 33'; Nadji 37'; Bouchar 75'	Soccerway report	Bendebka 44'; Nekkache 49'; Amada 61'	Stadium: Ahmed Zabana Stadium; Referee: Rafik Achouri

29 September 2018 Round 8	CR Belouizdad	0–1	MC Oran	Belouizdad
16:00		Soccerway report	Nadji 60'	Stadium: Stade 20 Août 1955; Referee: Abderrezzak Arab

7 October 2018 Round 9	MC Oran	0–1	ES Sétif	Oran
17:00		Soccerway report	Chibane 84' (o.g.)	Stadium: Ahmed Zabana Stadium; Referee: Lyés Bekouassa

11 October 2018 Round 10	Olympique de Médéa	1–1	MC Oran	Médéa
15:00	Sameur 23'	Soccerway report	Mansouri 44'	Stadium: Stade Imam Lyes de Médéa; Referee: Ahmed Bouzrar

19 October 2018 Round 11	MC Oran	0–0	JS Kabylie	Oran
17:45		Soccerway report		Stadium: Ahmed Zabana Stadium; Referee: Mehdi Abid Charef

30 October 2018 Round 12	MC Oran	3–1	DRB Tadjenanet	Oran
17:00	Bouchar 50'; Nadji 56'; Chibane 72'	Soccerway report	Aribi 44'	Stadium: Ahmed Zabana Stadium; Referee: Amine Hansal

6 November 2018 Round 13	CS Constantine	0–0	MC Oran	Constantine
17:00		Soccerway report		Stadium: Stade Mohamed Hamlaoui; Referee: Lahlou Benbraham

12 November 2018 Round 14	MC Oran	0–0	USM Alger	Oran
17:00		Soccerway report		Stadium: Ahmed Zabana Stadium; Referee: Abderrezzak Arab

21 November 2018 Round 15	NA Hussein Dey	1–0	MC Oran	Belouizdad
16:00	Gasmi 68' (pen.)	Soccerway report		Stadium: Stade 20 Août 1955; Referee: Ahmed Bouzrar

4 January 2019 Round 16	CA Bordj Bou Arreridj	3–1	MC Oran	Magra (Note: CA Bordj Bou Arreridj played their home match against MC Oran at Boucheligue Brothers Stadium, Magra, instead of their regular stadium Stade 20 Août 1955, Bordj Bou Arréridj.)
15:00	Ziad 22'; Zerara 72' (pen.); Droueche 89'	Soccerway report	Chibane 42'	Stadium: Boucheligue Brothers Stadium; Attendance: 0 (close doors); Referee: Lotfi Bekouassa

22 January 2019 Round 17	MC Oran	1–1	JS Saoura	Oran
17:45	Toumi 40'	Soccerway report	Yahia-Chérif 21'	Stadium: Ahmed Zabana Stadium; Referee: Lahlou Benbraham

18 January 2019 Round 18	MO Béjaïa	0–3	MC Oran	Béjaïa
16:00		Soccerway report	Nadji 13', 28'; Ali Guechi 82' (o.g.)	Stadium: Stade de l'Unité Maghrébine; Referee: Lyés Bekouassa

25 January 2019 Round 19	MC Oran	2–2	USM Bel Abbès	Oran
16:00	Boudebouda 40'; Mansouri 73' (pen.)	Soccerway report	Mesmoudi 13', 90+3'	Stadium: Ahmed Zabana Stadium; Referee: Lotfi Bekouassa

4 February 2019 Round 20	AS Ain M'lila	0–0	MC Oran	Aïn M'lila
15:00		Soccerway report		Stadium: Stade Khelifi Touhami Zoubir; Referee: Ahmed Bouzrar

8 February 2019 Round 21	MC Oran	0–2	Paradou AC	Oran
16:00		Soccerway report	Naidji 71', 79'	Stadium: Ahmed Zabana Stadium; Referee: Mehdi Abid Charef

9 April 2019 Round 22	MC Alger	1–0	MC Oran	Algiers
17:45	Frioui 84'	Soccerway report		Stadium: July 5, 1962 Stadium; Referee: Farouk Mial

3 March 2019 Round 23	MC Oran	1–1	CR Belouizdad	Oran
16:00	Nessakh 8' (o.g.)	Soccerway report	Soumana 58'	Stadium: Ahmed Zabana Stadium; Referee: Rafik Achouri

17 March 2019 Round 24	ES Sétif	4–1	MC Oran	Sétif
17:45	Djahnit 28'; Bouguelmouna 42', 59'; Radouani 79'	Soccerway report	Mahammedi 48'	Stadium: Stade 8 Mai 1945; Attendance: 0 (close doors); Referee: Hamza Bouslimani

2 April 2019 Round 25	MC Oran	1–0	Olympique de Médéa	Oran
17:00	Assié Koua 83'	Soccerway report		Stadium: Ahmed Zabana Stadium; Referee: Abderrezzak Arab

21 April 2019 Round 26	JS Kabylie	4–2	MC Oran	Tizi Ouzou
16:00	Abdul Razak 3', 58'; Chetti 43'; Hamroune 45+2'	Soccerway report	Mansouri 12' (pen.), 81' (pen.)	Stadium: November 1, 1954 Stadium; Referee: Said Aouina

11 May 2019 Round 27	DRB Tadjenanet	0–0	MC Oran	Tadjenanet
22:30		Soccerway report		Stadium: Lahoua Smaïl Stadium; Referee: Lotfi Bekouassa

16 May 2019 Round 28	MC Oran	1–0	CS Constantine	Oran
22:30	Guertil 34'	Soccerway report		Stadium: Ahmed Zabana Stadium; Referee: Amine Sekhraoui

21 May 2019 Round 29	USM Alger	1–1	MC Oran	Bologhine
22:30	Benmoussa 43' (pen.)	Soccerway report	Assie 58'	Stadium: Omar Hamadi Stadium; Referee: Said Aouina

26 May 2019 Round 30	MC Oran	3–2	NA Hussein Dey	Oran
22:30	Heriat 3'; Nadji 64'; Mansouri 73'	Soccerway report	Boutmene 51', 77'	Stadium: Ahmed Zabana Stadium; Referee: Redouane Necib

== Algerian Cup ==
18 December 2018 Round of 64	MC Oran	3–2	ASB Maghnia	Oran
15:00	Boudebouda 18', 45'; Toumi 43'	Report; Live TV: EPTV Local / Algeria 3	37', 63' Saidi	Stadium: Ahmed Zabana Stadium; Referee: Hamza Boucetta

28 December 2018 Round of 32	RA Aïn Defla	1–2	MC Oran	Aïn Defla
14:30	Mekkioui 57'	Report; Live TV: None	7' Toumi; 13' Boudebouda	Stadium: Abdelkader Khelal Stadium

29 January 2019 Round of 16	MC Oran	2–0 (a.e.t.)	NC Magra	Oran
17:00	Mansouri 105' (pen.); Benrezoug 109'	Report; Live TV: EPTV Local		Stadium: Ahmed Zabana Stadium

12 March 2019 Quarter-finals - 1st leg	CS Constantine	1–1	MC Oran	Constantine
17:00	Belkacemi 89'	Report; Live TV: Canal Algérie, Algeria 3	80' El Moudene	Stadium: Mohamed Hamlaoui Stadium; Attendance: 30 000; Referee: Lotfi Bekouassa

28 March 2019 Quarter-finals - 2nd leg	MC Oran	1–1 (a.e.t.) (4–5 p)	CS Constantine	Oran
17:00	Nadji 58'	Report; Live TV: Algeria local	68' Zaalani	Stadium: Ahmed Zabana Stadium; Attendance: 30 000; Referee: Said Aouina
	Penalties
	Nadji (penalty scored); Halaïmia (penalty scored); Boudebouda (penalty scored); Mansouri (penalty scored); Aouadj (penalty missed); Mahammedi (penalty missed)		(penalty missed) Abid; (penalty scored) Belkheir; (penalty scored) Lamri; (penalty scored) Benayada; (penalty scored) Djabout; (penalty scored) Gagaâ

== Squad information ==
=== Playing statistics ===
No.	Pos	Nat	Player	Total		Ligue 1		Algerian Cup	
No.	Pos	Nat	Player	Apps	Goals	Apps	Goals	Apps	Goals
Goalkeepers
	GK	(Algeria) ALG	[[]]	0	0	0	0	0	0
	GK	(Algeria) ALG	[[]]	0	0	0	0	0	0
Defenders
	DF	(Algeria) ALG	[[]]	0	0	0	0	0	0
	DF	(Algeria) ALG	[[]]	0	0	0	0	0	0
	DF	(Algeria) ALG	[[]]	0	0	0	0	0	0
	DF	(Algeria) ALG	[[]]	0	0	0	0	0	0
	DF	(Algeria) ALG	[[]]	0	0	0	0	0	0
	DF	(Algeria) ALG	[[]]	0	0	0	0	0	0
	DF	(Algeria) ALG	[[]]	0	0	0	0	0	0
	DF	(Algeria) ALG	[[]]	0	0	0	0	0	0
Midfielders
	MF	(Algeria) ALG	[[]]	0	0	0	0	0	0
	MF	(Algeria) ALG	[[]]	0	0	0	0	0	0
	MF	(Algeria) ALG	[[]]	0	0	0	0	0	0
	MF	(Algeria) ALG	[[]]	0	0	0	0	0	0
	MF	(Algeria) ALG	[[]]	0	0	0	0	0	0
	MF	(Algeria) ALG	[[]]	0	0	0	0	0	0
	MF	(Algeria) ALG	[[]]	0	0	0	0	0	0
	MF	(Algeria) ALG	[[]]	0	0	0	0	0	0
Forwards
	FW	(Algeria) ALG	[[]]	0	0	0	0	0	0
	FW	(Algeria) ALG	[[]]	0	0	0	0	0	0
	FW	(Algeria) ALG	[[]]	0	0	0	0	0	0
	FW	(Algeria) ALG	[[]]	0	0	0	0	0	0
	FW	(Algeria) ALG	[[]]	0	0	0	0	0	0
	FW	(Algeria) ALG	[[]]	0	0	0	0	0	0
	FW	(Algeria) ALG	[[]]	0	0	0	0	0	0
	FW	(Algeria) ALG	[[]]	0	0	0	0	0	0
Players transferred out during the season

Last updated: 12 June 2018
Source: fr.soccerway.com

== Transfers ==
=== In ===
Date	Pos	Player	From club	Transfer fee	Source
1 July 2018	GK	(Algeria) Oussama Litim	DRB Tadjenanet	Free transfer	
1 July 2018	GK	(Algeria) Sid Ahmed Rafik Mazouzi	USM El Harrach	Free transfer	
1 July 2018	DF	(Algeria) Sofiane Bouchar	CR Belouizdad	Free transfer	
1 July 2018	DF	(Algeria) Brahim Boudebouda	MC Alger	Free transfer	
1 July 2018	MF	(Algeria) Hamza Aït Ouamar	ES Sétif	Free transfer	
1 July 2018	MF	(Algeria) Bouazza Feham	(Saudi Arabia) Al-Hazem	Free transfer	
1 July 2018	MF	(Algeria) Nassim Yettou	JS Kabylie	Free transfer	
1 July 2018	FW	(Algeria) Youcef Chibane	ES Sétif	Free transfer	
1 July 2018	FW	(Algeria) Rachid Nadji	ES Sétif	Free transfer	

=== Out ===
Date	Pos	Player	From club	Transfer fee	Source
25 January 2019	MF	(Algeria) Hamza Aït Ouamar	(Saudi Arabia) Al-Washm	Free transfer	
