= Sofiane Bouchar =

Algerian footballer (born 1994)

Personal information
- Full name: Sofiane Bouchar
- Date of birth: 21 May 1994 (age 32)
- Place of birth: Skikda, Algeria
- Height: 1.87 m (6 ft 2 in)
- Position: Centre back

Team information
- Current team: CR Belouizdad
- Number: 23

Senior career*
Years	Team	Apps	(Gls)
2013–2017	ES Sétif	44	(0)
2017–2018	CR Belouizdad	27	(3)
2018	MC Oran	11	(2)
2019–2023	CR Belouizdad	102	(6)
2023–2025	Al-Arabi	33	(3)
2024	→ CR Belouizdad (loan)	11	(0)
2025–2026	Qadsia SC	14	(0)
2026–	CR Belouizdad	0	(0)

International career^{‡}
2015	Algeria U23	1	(0)
- * Club domestic league appearances and goals as of 28 June 2026 ‡ National team caps and goals as of 19 July 2017

Sofiane Bouchar (Arabic: سفيان بوشعر; born 21 May 1994) is an Algerian professional footballer who olays for CR Belouizdad.

== History ==
In February 2014, he made his senior debut as a starter in a league match against MC Oran. On 17 July 2017, He joined CR Belouizdad. On 17 June 2018, He joined MC Oran . On 5 December 2018, he returned to CR Belouizdad. On 21 July 2023, he joined Kuwaiti club Al-Arabi. On 10 January 2024, he returned to CR Belouizdad on loan. In July 2025 he joined Kuwaiti club Qadsia SC. On 27 June 2026, he returned to CR Belouizdad.

== Career statistics ==
=== Club ===
As of 12 June 2025

Appearances and goals by club, season and competition
Club	Season	League			Cup		Continental		Other		Total	
Club	Season	Division	Apps	Goals	Apps	Goals	Apps	Goals	Apps	Goals	Apps	Goals
ES Sétif	2013–14	Ligue 1	4	0	—		—		—		4	0
ES Sétif	2014–15	Ligue 1	10	0	3	0	—		—		13	0
ES Sétif	2015–16	Ligue 1	21	0	4	0	9 (Note: All appearance(s) in Champions League)	0	1 (Note: All appearances in Algerian Super Cup)	0	35	0
ES Sétif	2016–17	Ligue 1	9	0	6	1	—		—		15	1
ES Sétif	Total		44	0	13	1	9	0	1	0	67	1
CR Belouizdad	2017–18	Ligue 1	27	1	—		5 (Note: All appearance(s) in Confederation Cup)	1	1	0	33	2
MC Oran	2018–19	Ligue 1	11	2	—		—		—		11	2
CR Belouizdad	2018–19	Ligue 1	14	1	8	1	—		—		22	2
CR Belouizdad	2019–20	Ligue 1	16	2	3	1	4	0	—		23	3
CR Belouizdad	2020–21	Ligue 1	29	1	—		12	0	2 (Note: One appearance in Algerian Super Cup, One appearance in Algerian League Cup)	0	43	0
CR Belouizdad	2021–22	Ligue 1	26	2	—		11	2	—		37	4
CR Belouizdad	2022–23	Ligue 1	23	0	5	0	10	0	—		38	0
CR Belouizdad	Total		106	6	16	2	37	2	2	0	163	10
Al-Arabi	2023–24	KPL	11	0	—		4 (Note: All appearance(s) in AFC Cup)	0	—		15	0
Al-Arabi	2024–25	KPL	22	2	3	0	6 (Note: All appearance(s) in AFC Challenge League)	1	5	0	36	3
Career total			201	9	29	3	55	3	4	0	289	15

== Honours ==
ES Sétif

- Algerian Ligue Professionnelle 1: 2014–15, 2016–17
- Algerian Super Cup: 2015

CR Belouizdad

- Algerian Ligue Professionnelle 1: 2019–20, 2020–21, 2021–22, 2022–23
- Algerian Cup: 2019, 2023-24
- Algerian Super Cup: 2019

Qadsia

- Kuwait Super Cup: 2025-26
