= Salah Fakroun =

Libyan footballer (born 1999)

Personal information
- Full name: Salaheddin Ahmed Farag Fakroun
- Date of birth: 8 February 1999 (age 27)
- Place of birth: Benghazi, Libya
- Height: 1.80 m (5 ft 11 in)
- Position: Centre-back

Team information
- Current team: Al-Nasr Benghazi
- Number: 24

Senior career*
Years	Team	Apps	(Gls)
2018–	Al-Nasr Benghazi		

International career^{‡}
2020–	Libya	6	(0)
- * Club domestic league appearances and goals ‡ National team caps and goals as of 00:42, 19 October 2021 (UTC)

Salaheddin Ahmed Farag Fakroun (Arabic: صَلَاح الدِّين أَحْمَد فَرَج فَكْرُون; born 8 February 1999), known as Salah Fakroun, is a Libyan professional footballer who plays as a centre-back for Libyan Premier League club Al-Nasr Benghazi and the Libya national team.
