= 2018–19 in Algerian football =

Football in Algeria
- Season: 2018–19

Men's football
- Ligue 1: USM Alger
- Ligue 2: US Biskra
- DNA: Est AS Khroub; Centre RC Arbaâ; Ouest OM Arzew
- Régional I: Alger; Blida; Constantine; Annaba; Batna; Oran; Saida; Ouargla; Béchar
- Algerian Cup: CR Belouizdad
- Super Cup: USM Bel Abbès

The 2018–19 season will be the 56th season of competitive association football in Algeria. The national team became African champions for the second time, by winning the 2019 Africa Cup of Nations held in Egypt.

== National teams ==
=== Algeria national football team ===
==== Kits ====
Home	Away	Goalkeeper 1	Goalkeeper 2	Goalkeeper 3

==== Results and fixtures ====
===== Friendlies =====
27 December 2018 Friendly	Qatar	0–1	Algeria	Doha, Qatar
15:00 (AST)		Report	Bounedjah 57'	Stadium: Khalifa International Stadium

26 March 2019 Friendly	Algeria	1–0	Tunisia	Blida, Algeria
20:45 (CET)	Bounedjah 70' (pen.)	Report		Stadium: Stade Mustapha Tchaker; Referee: Samir Guezzaz (Morocco)

11 June 2019 Friendly	Algeria	1–1	Burundi	Doha, Qatar
19:00 (CET)	Bounedjah 66'	Report	M'Bolhi 75' (o.g.)	Stadium: Jassim bin Hamad Stadium

16 June 2019 Friendly	Algeria	3–2	Mali	Doha, Qatar
21:00 (AST)	Bounedjah 41'; Belaïli 76' (pen.); Delort 81'	Report	Diaby 20' (pen.); Sacko 68'	Stadium: Khalifa International Stadium

==== 2019 Africa Cup of Nations qualification ====
Pos	Team	Pld	W	D	L	GF	GA	GD	Pts	Qualification
1	Algeria	6	3	2	1	9	4	+5	11	Final tournament
2	Benin	6	3	1	2	5	6	−1	10	Final tournament
3	Gambia	6	1	3	2	6	6	0	6	
4	Togo	6	1	2	3	4	8	−4	5	

Source: CAF
Rules for classification: Qualification tiebreakers

8 September 2018 2	Gambia	1–1	Algeria	Bakau
16:30 UTC+0	Ceesay 49'	Report	Bounedjah 47'	Stadium: Independence Stadium; Referee: Youssef Essrayri (Tunisia)

12 October 2018 3	Algeria	2–0	Benin	Blida
20:45 UTC+1	Bensebaini 20'; Bounedjah 73'	Report		Stadium: Stade Mustapha Tchaker; Referee: Sékou Ahmed Touré (Guinea)

16 October 2018 4	Benin	1–0	Algeria	Cotonou
16:05 UTC+1	D'Almeida 16'	Report		Stadium: Stade de l'Amitié; Referee: Jackson Pavaza (Namibia)

18 November 2018 5	Togo	1–4	Algeria	Lomé
16:00 UTC+0	Fo-Doh Laba 55'	Report	Mahrez 13', 30'; Attal 28'; Bounedjah 90+2'	Stadium: Stade Municipal; Referee: Davies Omweno (Kenya)

22 March 2019 6	Algeria	1–1	Gambia	Blida
20:45 UTC+1	Abeid 42'	Report	Danso 90+2'	Stadium: Stade Mustapha Tchaker; Referee: Sidi Alioum (Cameroon)

==== 2019 Africa Cup of Nations ====
Raising big concerns over Algeria in the 2019 Africa Cup of Nations. Thus, Algeria was not expected to contend for the trophy, but was nonetheless expected to proceed at least to the quarter-finals. In spite of criticisms of Belmadi, Algeria topped group C won all three matches including a 1–0 victory over 2018 FIFA World Cup's participant Senegal. Algeria's solid performance continued with a 3–0 win over Guinea in the round of sixteen; before they overcame Ivory Coast in a hard-fought encounter which they won in a penalty shootout 4–3, after having drawn 1–1 after 120 minutes. The Algerians then went on to defeat Nigeria 2–1 with a dying minute's free kick shot by Riyad Mahrez. Facing Senegal once again in the final, Baghdad Bounedjah scored the only goal of the game as Algeria won 1–0, earning them their second title since 1990. This made Algeria the second North African side after Egypt to win more than one AFCON trophy.

===== Group C =====
Pos	Team	Pld	W	D	L	GF	GA	GD	Pts	Qualification
1	Algeria	3	3	0	0	6	0	+6	9	Advance to knockout stage
2	Senegal	3	2	0	1	5	1	+4	6	Advance to knockout stage
3	Kenya	3	1	0	2	3	7	−4	3	
4	Tanzania	3	0	0	3	2	8	−6	0	

Source: CAF
Rules for classification: Tiebreakers

23 June 2019	Algeria	2–0	Kenya	Cairo
22:00	Bounedjah 34' (pen.); Mahrez 43'	Report		Stadium: 30 June Stadium; Attendance: 8,071; Referee: Mahamadou Keita (Mali)

27 June 2019	Senegal	0–1	Algeria	Cairo
19:00		Report	Belaïli 49'	Stadium: 30 June Stadium; Attendance: 25,765; Referee: Janny Sikazwe (Zambia)

1 July 2019	Tanzania	0–3	Algeria	Cairo
21:00		Report	Slimani 35'; Ounas 39', 45+1'	Stadium: Al Salam Stadium; Attendance: 8,921; Referee: Andofetra Rakotojaona (Madagascar)

===== knockout stage =====
====== Round of 16 ======
7 July 2019	Algeria	3–0	Guinea	Cairo
21:00	Belaïli 24'; Mahrez 57'; Ounas 82'	Report		Stadium: 30 June Stadium; Attendance: 8,205; Referee: Bernard Camille (Seychelles)

====== Quarter-finals ======
11 July 2019	Ivory Coast	1–1 (a.e.t.) (3–4 p)	Algeria	Suez
18:00	Kodjia 62'	Report	Feghouli 20'	Stadium: Suez Stadium; Attendance: 8,233; Referee: Bamlak Tessema Weyesa (Ethiopia)
	Penalties
	Kessié (penalty scored); Cornet (penalty scored); Bony (penalty missed); Gradel (penalty scored); Dié (penalty missed)		(penalty scored) Bensebaini; (penalty scored) Slimani; (penalty scored) Delort; (penalty scored) Ounas; (penalty missed) Belaïli

====== Semi-finals ======
14 July 2019	Algeria	2–1	Nigeria	Cairo
21:00	Troost-Ekong 40' (o.g.); Mahrez 90+5'	Report	Ighalo 72' (pen.)	Stadium: Cairo International Stadium; Attendance: 49,775; Referee: Bakary Gassama (Gambia)

====== Final ======
19 July 2019
21:00

Senegal	0–1	Algeria
	Report	Bounedjah 2'

Cairo International Stadium, Cairo
Attendance: 75,000
Referee: Sidi Alioum (Cameroon)

== League season ==
=== Ligue Professionnelle 1 ===
Pos	Team	Pld	W	D	L	GF	GA	GD	Pts	Qualification or relegation
1	USM Alger (C)	30	15	8	7	49	29	+20	53	Qualification for Champions League
2	JS Kabylie	30	15	7	8	38	25	+13	52	Qualification for Champions League
3	Paradou AC	30	14	6	10	38	24	+14	48	Qualification for Confederation Cup
4	JS Saoura	30	13	8	9	33	22	+11	47	Qualification for Arab Club Champions Cup
5	ES Sétif	30	13	6	11	34	24	+10	45	
6	MC Alger	30	11	10	9	35	36	−1	43	Qualification for Arab Club Champions Cup
7	CS Constantine	30	10	10	10	30	24	+6	40	Qualification for Arab Club Champions Cup
8	CR Belouizdad	30	10	11	9	28	27	+1	38 (Note: CR Belouizdad were deducted 3 points.)	Qualification for Confederation Cup (Note: CR Belouizdad are Algerian Cup winners.)
9	CA Bordj Bou Arreridj	30	9	10	11	22	24	−2	37	
10	MC Oran	30	8	12	10	33	38	−5	36 (Note: Head-to-head: MC Oran 7 points; NA Hussein Dey 5 points; AS Aïn M'lila 3 points.)	
11	NA Hussein Dey	30	9	9	12	22	29	−7	36	
12	AS Aïn M'lila	30	7	15	8	20	30	−10	36	
13	USM Bel Abbès	30	9	8	13	24	39	−15	35	
14	MO Béjaïa (R)	30	7	12	11	23	36	−13	33	Relegation to Ligue 2
15	DRB Tadjenanet (R)	30	7	10	13	26	38	−12	31 (Note: Head-to-head: DRB Tadjenanet 4 points; Olympique de Médéa 1 point.)	Relegation to Ligue 2
16	Olympique de Médéa (R)	30	7	10	13	21	31	−10	31	Relegation to Ligue 2

Source: DZFoot
Rules for classification: 1) points; 2) head-to-head points; 3) head-to-head goal difference; 4) goal difference; 5) total goals; 6) fairplay ranking; 7) playoff.
(C) Champions; (R) Relegated

=== Ligue Professionnelle 2 ===
Pos	Team	Pld	W	D	L	GF	GA	GD	Pts	Qualification or relegation
1	US Biskra (R)	30	16	7	7	39	28	+11	55	2019–20 Professional League 1
2	NC Magra (P)	30	16	9	5	37	25	+12	53	2019–20 Professional League 1
3	ASO Chlef (P)	30	14	10	6	35	23	+12	52	2019–20 Professional League 1
4	WA Tlemcen	30	15	7	8	44	29	+15	52	
5	RC Relizane	30	15	5	10	27	17	+10	50	
6	MC El Eulma	30	11	8	11	29	26	+3	41	
7	A Bou Saâda	30	10	9	11	32	31	+1	39	
8	USM Annaba	30	11	6	13	19	24	−5	39	
9	JSM Béjaïa	30	10	8	12	31	32	−1	38	
10	JSM Skikda	30	10	8	12	22	25	−3	38	
11	USM El Harrach	30	7	15	8	22	24	−2	36	
12	MC Saïda	30	8	12	10	26	30	−4	36	
13	ASM Oran	30	8	11	11	37	34	+3	35	
14	ES Mostaganem (R)	30	8	11	11	29	37	−8	35	2019–20 League of Amateurs
15	RC Kouba (R)	30	4	14	12	18	33	−15	26	2019–20 League of Amateurs
16	USM Blida (P)	30	3	8	19	15	44	−29	17	2019–20 League of Amateurs

Updated to match(es) played on 11 May 2018. Source: DZFOOT.COM
Rules for classification: 1) points; 2) goal difference; 3) number of goals scored.
(P) Promoted; (R) Relegated

=== Division Nationale Amateur ===
==== Group West ====
Pos	Team	Pld	W	D	L	GF	GA	GD	Pts

Updated to match(es) played on 1 June 2024. Source: lnf-amateur.dz
Rules for classification: 1) points; 2) head-to-head points; 3) head-to-head goal difference; 4) goal difference; 5) total goals; 6) fairplay ranking; 7) playoff.

==== Group Centre ====
Pos	Team	Pld	W	D	L	GF	GA	GD	Pts

Updated to match(es) played on 1 June 2024. Source: lnf-amateur.dz
Rules for classification: 1) points; 2) head-to-head points; 3) head-to-head goal difference; 4) goal difference; 5) total goals; 6) fairplay ranking; 7) playoff.

==== Group East ====
Pos	Team	Pld	W	D	L	GF	GA	GD	Pts

Updated to match(es) played on 1 June 2024. Source: lnf-amateur.dz
Rules for classification: 1) points; 2) head-to-head points; 3) head-to-head goal difference; 4) goal difference; 5) total goals; 6) fairplay ranking; 7) playoff.

== National Cups ==
=== Algerian Cup ===
==== Final ====
June 8, 2019
17:00

CR Belouizdad	2–0	JSM Béjaïa
Sayoud 76'; Bousseliou 90+5'	Report

Mustapha Tchaker Stadium, Blida
Attendance: 28,000
Referee: Mohamed Saïdi

=== Super Cup ===
1 November 2018
17:00

CS Constantine	0–1
	Report	Lamara 90+4' (pen.)

Mustapha Tchaker Stadium, Blida
Referee: Mohamed Saïdi
