= Khaled Bousseliou =

Algerian footballer (born 1997)

Personal information
- Date of birth: 3 October 1997 (age 29)
- Place of birth: Thenia, Algeria
- Height: 1.83 m (6 ft 0 in)
- Position: Left winger

Team information
- Current team: Olympique Akbou
- Number: 11

Youth career
- –2018: CR Belouizdad

Senior career*
Years	Team	Apps	(Gls)
2018–2022	CR Belouizdad	67	(8)
2022–2026	USM Alger	46	(2)
2026	Al Ta'awon SC	0	(0)
2026–	Olympique Akbou	0	(0)
- * Club domestic league appearances and goals as of 10 June 2026

Khaled Bousseliou (Arabic: خالد بوسليو; born 3 October 1997) is an Algerian professional footballer who plays as a left winger for Olympique Akbou.

== Career ==
=== CR Belouizdad ===
Khaled Bousseliou came from a poor neighborhood in Skikda to fulfill his dream in Algiers, where he used to work in a café to secure his day's sustenance. One day, the former CR Belouizdad player Karim Bakhti came to the café and talked to him about his dream of becoming a football player. Bakhti told him that he would try him in the club and if he was convinced he would join him. However, Bousseliou was not even sure of getting his place in the first team, as he had never been called up while part of the reserves.

In the entourage of the club, some people, in particular Billel, an agent working at Stade 20 Août 1955, regularly asked Ahmed Djaâfer, who was in charge of the club at the time, to sign this young prodigy. Seduced by the explosiveness, speed and technical finesse of this dribbling winger, skillful in front of goal, Tahar Chérif El-Ouazzani gave his approval for the signing of Bousseliou. El-Ouazzani said "He is a young player who has a lot of quality and who can become an important part of the Belouizdad squad in the years to come, of course if he continues to show the same seriousness in training".

Khaled Bousseliou continued his work and occasionally earned a few minutes of play. Bousseliou took on a new role within the Belouizdad workforce, that of a substitute player. "He is still young and as a technician, I have to protect him and watch over his progress," explained Amrani. In the first Algerian Cup final, "Skikdi" as his colleagues call him, delivered an assist and scored his first goal among professionals to win his first title.

In his second season Bousseliou continued his brilliance despite the departure of Amrani, the arrival of Frenchman Franck Dumas and the end of the season early due to the COVID-19 pandemic in Algeria. but he won the first title in Ligue 1. Bousseliou began to suffer from several injuries that affected his career with CR Belouizdad and with the change of the club's goals and the policy of contracting with the stars, his career with the Belouizdadis ended, during which he won five titles.

=== USM Alger ===
On 20 July 2022, Khaled Bousseliou signed a two-year contract with USM Alger, after terminating his contract with CR Belouizdad amicably. After a difficult start where Boualem Charef did not rely on him, and the first match was on 3 December as a substitute, with the advent of Abdelhak Benchikha, Bousseliou regained confidence and in the first match in the group stage of the Confederation Cup against Saint-Éloi Lupopo Bousseliou scored a double. In the second leg of the quarter-finals against AS FAR, after entering as a substitute, Bousseliou scored a Chip that contributed the qualification of USM Alger to the semi-finals. After relying on him previously as a substitute, Bousseliou participated as a starter in the match against ASEC Mimosas and scored the first goal to qualify for the first continental final in his history. On 3 June 2023, Bousseliou won the first international title by winning the 2022–23 CAF Confederation Cup after defeating Young Africans of Tanzania. On 16 August 2023, Khaled Bousseliou renewed his contract for two seasons until 2026 along with nine other players. On 15 September 2023, Bousseliou won the CAF Super Cup title after winning against Al Ahly, it is the second African title with USM Alger in three months.

=== Al Ta'awon SC ===
On 16 February 2026, he joined Libyan club Al Ta'awon SC.

=== Olympique Akbou ===
On 10 June 2026, he joined Olympique Akbou.

== Career statistics ==
As of 29 January 2026

Appearances and goals by club, season and competition
Club	Season	League			Cup		Continental		Other		Total	
Club	Season	Division	Apps	Goals	Apps	Goals	Apps	Goals	Apps	Goals	Apps	Goals
CR Belouizdad	2018–19	Ligue 1	20	0	8	1	—		—		28	1
CR Belouizdad	2019–20	Ligue 1	17	1	2	0	4 (Note: Appearance(s) in Confederation Cup)	0	—		23	1
CR Belouizdad	2020–21	Ligue 1	10	2	—		1 (Note: Appearance(s) in Champions League)	0	1 (Note: Appearances in Algerian Super Cup)	0	12	2
CR Belouizdad	2021–22	Ligue 1	19	5	—		10	1	—		29	6
CR Belouizdad	Total		66	8	10	1	15	1	1	0	92	10
USM Alger	2022–23	Ligue 1	10	0	1	0	11	4	—		22	4
USM Alger	2023–24	Ligue 1	11	1	2	0	5 (Note: One appearance in CAF Super Cup; four appearances in CAF Confederation Cup)	0	—		18	1
USM Alger	2024–25	Ligue 1	19	0	4	1	5	0	—		28	1
USM Alger	2025–26	Ligue 1	6	1	0	0	1	0	—		7	1
USM Alger	Total		46	2	6	1	22	4	—		75	7
Career total			112	10	16	2	37	5	1	0	167	17

== Honours ==
CR Belouizdad

- Ligue 1: 2019–20, 2020–21, 2021–22
- Algerian Cup: 2019
- Algerian Super Cup: 2019

USM Alger

- Algerian Cup: 2024–25
- CAF Confederation Cup: 2022–23
- CAF Super Cup: 2023
