= Youcef Bechou =

Algerian professional footballer (born 1997)

Personal information
- Full name: Youcef Bechou
- Date of birth: 1 March 1997 (age 29)
- Place of birth: Douéra, Algeria
- Height: 1.78 m (5 ft 10 in)
- Position: Winger

Team information
- Current team: ES Ben Aknoun
- Number: 10

Youth career
- 2014–2017: USM Alger

Senior career*
Years	Team	Apps	(Gls)
2017–2022	CR Belouizdad	68	(9)
2021–2022	→ Olympique de Médéa (loan)	9	(0)
2022–2023	Trofense	24	(2)
2023–2024	Anadia	4	(2)
2024	Amora	9	(0)
2024	São João de Ver	7	(0)
2025–2026	USM El Harrach	27	(13)
2026–	ES Ben Aknoun	0	(0)

International career^{‡}
2018	Algeria U21	2	(0)
2018–2019	Algeria U23	3	(0)
- * Club domestic league appearances and goals as of 12 July 2026 ‡ National team caps and goals as of 22:05, 11 February 2024 (UTC)

Youcef Bechou (Arabic: يوسف بشو; born 1 March 1997) is an Algerian professional footballer who plays as a winger for ES Ben Aknoun.

== Career ==
On August 25, 2017, Bechou made his professional debut for CR Belouizdad as a second-half substitute against USM Bel Abbès. In 2021, Bechou signed a loan contract with Olympique de Médéa.

On 31 January 2022, Bechou joined Liga Portugal 2 club Trofense. In the following seasons, he played for Liga 3 clubs Anadia and Amora.

On 12 July 2026, he joined ES Ben Aknoun.
