= Housseyn Selmi =

Algerian footballer (born 1993)

Personal information
- Full name: Housseyn Selmi
- Date of birth: February 11, 1993 (age 33)
- Place of birth: Jijel, Algeria
- Height: 1.70 m (5 ft 7 in)
- Position: Midfielder

Team information
- Current team: ES Ben Aknoun
- Number: 22

Youth career
- 2011–2013: JS Djijel

Senior career*
Years	Team	Apps	(Gls)
2013–2017	CA Batna	52	(0)
2017–2026	CR Belouizdad	179	(6)
2026	JS Saoura	12	(0)
2026–	ES Ben Aknoun	1	(0)

International career^{‡}
2019–	Algeria	1	(0)
- * Club domestic league appearances and goals as of 3 September 2026 ‡ National team caps and goals as of 17 November 2019

Housseyn Selmi (Arabic: حسين سالمي; born 11 February 1993) is an Algerian footballer who plays as a midfielder for ES Ben Aknoun.

== Club career ==
Selmi made his professional debut with CA Batna in a 1-0 Algerian Ligue Professionnelle 1 loss to Olympique de Médéa on 20 August 2016.

On 31 January 2026, he joined JS Saoura.

On 5 August 2026, he joined ES Ben Aknoun.
