= Adel Djerrar =

Algerian footballer (born 1990)

Personal information
- Date of birth: 3 March 1990 (age 36)
- Place of birth: Boumerdès, Algeria
- Position: Midfielder

Team information
- Current team: NA Hussein Dey

Senior career*
Years	Team	Apps	(Gls)
2010–2014	CA Bordj Bou Arréridj	52	(3)
2015–2016	RC Relizane	25	(0)
2016–2018	JS Kabylie	36	(0)
2018–2022	CR Belouizdad	63	(6)
2022–2023	Al-Nasr SC		
2023–2024	US Souf	3	(0)
2024–	NA Hussein Dey	0	(0)
- * Club domestic league appearances and goals as of 10 August 2023

Adel Djerrar (Arabic: عادل جرار; born 3 March 1990) is an Algerian footballer who plays for NA Hussein Dey as a midfielder.

== Career ==
In June 2016, he joined JS Kabylie. In June 2018, Djerrar signed a contract with CR Belouizdad. In September 2022, he joined Al-Nasr SC. In August 2023, he joined US Souf. On 25 January 2024, djerrar joined NA Hussein Dey.
