= Bilal Tarikat =

Algerian footballer (born 1991)

Personal information
- Date of birth: 12 June 1991 (age 35)
- Place of birth: Thénia, Algeria
- Position: Midfielder

Senior career*
Years	Team	Apps	(Gls)
2012–2022	CR Belouizdad	130	(0)

International career^{‡}
2019–	Algeria	1	(0)
- * Club domestic league appearances and goals as of 25 August 2022 ‡ National team caps and goals as of 17 November 2019

Bilal Tarikat (born 12 June 1991) is an Algerian footballer who plays as a midfielder.
