= Mehdi Abid Charef =

Algerian association football referee

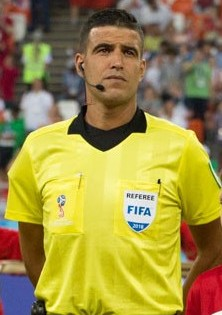
- Full name: Mehdi Abid Charef
- Born: December 14, 1980 (age 45); Constantine, Algeria

Domestic
Years	League	Role

International
Years	League	Role
2011–2018	FIFA listed	Referee

Mehdi Abid Charef (born 14 December 1980 in Constantine) is an Algerian association football referee.

He also participated at the 2015 FIFA U-17 World Cup in Chile and the 2017 FIFA U-17 World Cup in India

== International Matches ==
- 2015 Africa Cup of Nations in Equatorial Guinea
  - Ivory Coast vs Guinea (group stage).
- 2015 FIFA U-17 World Cup in Chile
  - Germany vs Australia (group stage)
  - France vs Paraguay (group stage)
- 2016 African Nations Championship (CHAN) in Rwanda
  - Mali vs Uganda (group stage)
- 2017 Africa Cup of Nations in Gabon
  - Ghana vs Mali (group stage)
  - Ghana vs Burkina Faso (Match for third place)
- 2017 FIFA U-17 World Cup in India
  - Germany vs Costa Rica (group stage)
  - Honduras vs New Caldedonia (group stage)
  - Mali vs Ghana (quarter final)
- 2018 African Nations Championship (CHAN) in Morocco
  - Zambia vs Uganda (group stage)
  - Sudan vs Libya (Match for third place)
