= List of MC Oran players =

Below is a list of notable footballers who have played for MC Oran. Generally, this means players that have played 100 or more league matches for the club. However, some players who have played fewer matches are also included; this includes players that have had considerable success either at other clubs or at international level, as well as players who are well remembered by the supporters for particular reasons.

Players are listed in alphabetical order according to the date of their first-team official debut for the club. Appearances and goals are for first-team competitive matches only. Substitute appearances included. Statistics accurate as of 26 May 2019.

== Key ==
¤	Club captains who have won a major senior competition
*	Club record holder
^{†}	Played their full career at MC Oran
**Name in bold**	Currently playing for MC Oran

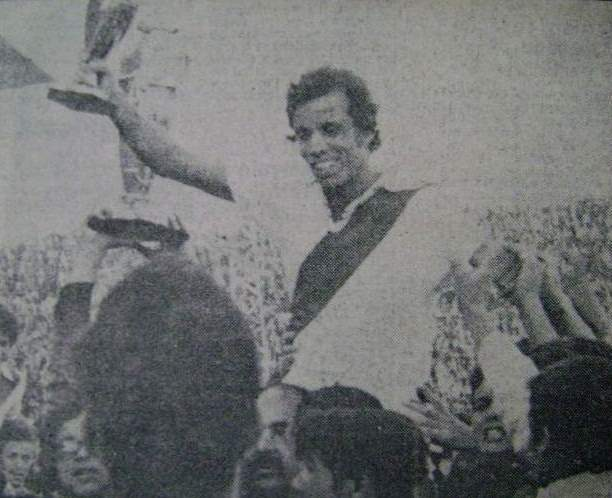
Abdelkader Fréha

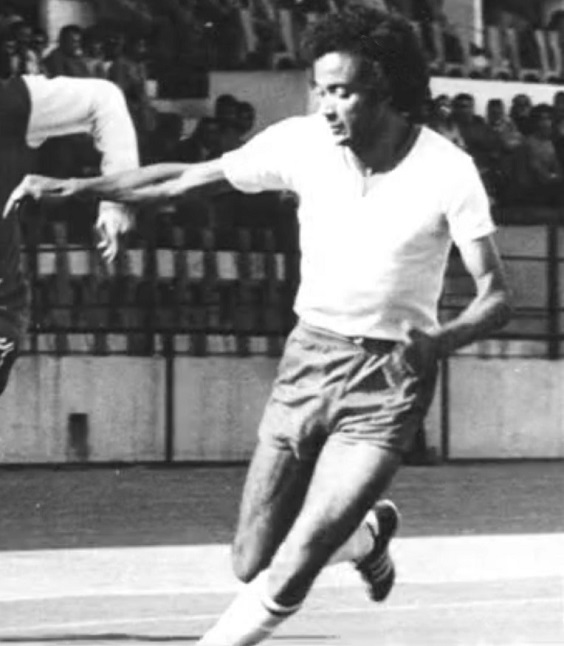
Miloud Hadefi

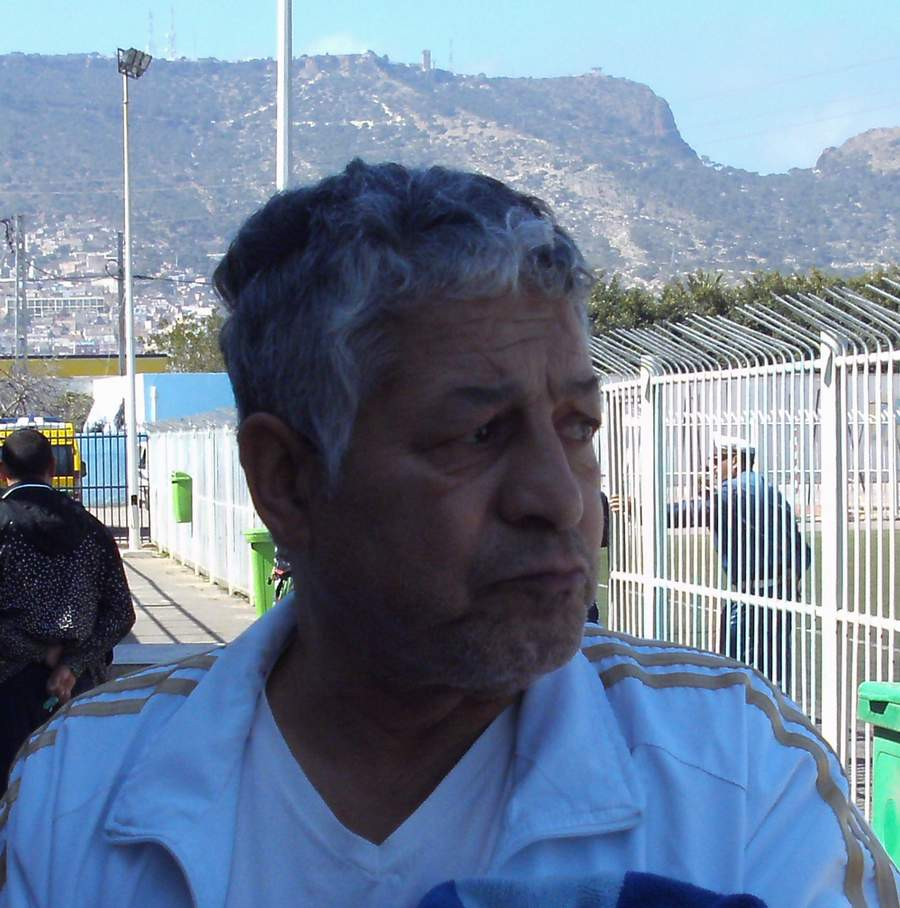
Sid Ahmed Belkedrouci

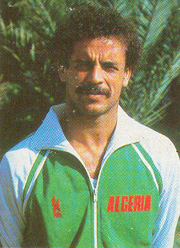
Lakhdar Belloumi

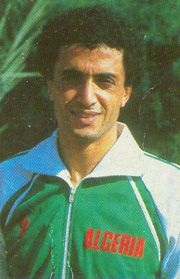
Tedj Bensaoula

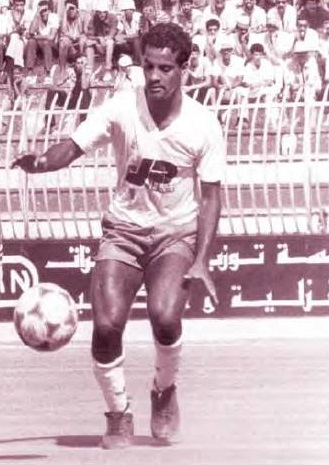
Tahar Chérif El-Ouazzani

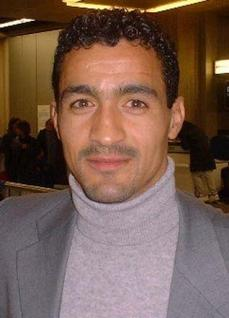
Abdelhafid Tasfaout

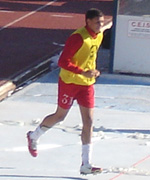
Mohamed Zubya

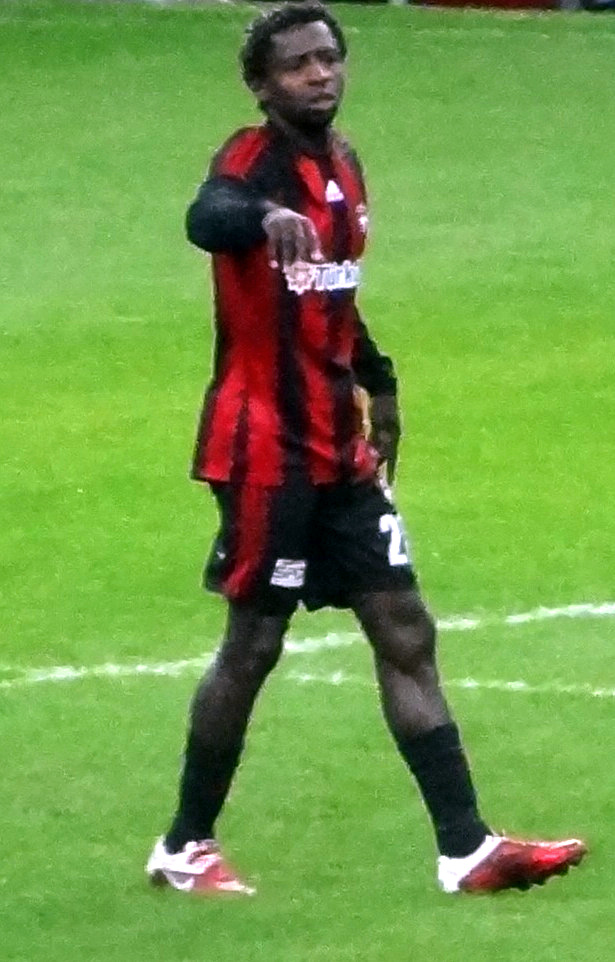
Gilles Binya

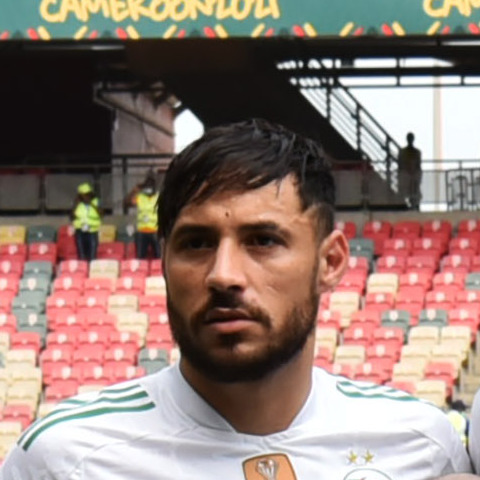
Youcef Belaïli

Name	Nationality	Position	Inter career	Captaincy	Appearances	Goals	Notes
Lahouari Orfi	(Algeria)	FW	1917–1924	1917–1924 ¤	—	—	
Ali Bentouti	(Algeria)	FW	1924–??	—	—	—	
Mahmoud Benahmed	(Algeria)	FW	1946–??	—	—	—	
Mohamed Bessol	(Algeria)	FW	1946–??	—	—	—	
Kouider Boudadi	(Algeria)	FW	1946–??	—	—	—	
Djillali Chaâ	(Algeria)	FW	1946–??	—	—	—	
Mohamed Djabeur	(Algeria)	FW	1946–??	—	—	—	
Mohamed Doubali	(Algeria)	FW	1946–??	—	—	—	
Kada Fali	(Algeria)	FW	1946–??	—	—	—	
Ahmed Fouatih	(Algeria)	FW	1946–??	—	—	—	
Lahouari Gallia	(Algeria)	FW	1946–??	—	—	—	
Zouine Refsi	(Algeria)	FW	1946–??	—	—	—	
Lahouari Sebaâ	(Algeria)	FW	1946–??	—	—	—	
Kada Touha	(Algeria)	FW	1946–??	—	—	—	
Mohamed Yahiaoui (Salem)	(Algeria)	FW	1946–??	—	—	—	
Mohamed Yatim	(Algeria)	FW	1946–??	—	—	—	
Maâmar Zerfaoui	(Algeria)	FW	1946–??	—	—	—	
Benyoucef Fréha	(Algeria)	FW	????–??	—	—	—	
Habib Guessab Bloufa	(Algeria)	FW	????–??	—	—	—	
Djillali Zradni "Stamba"	(Algeria)	FW	????–??	—	—	—	
Mohamed Salem	(Algeria)	FW	1955–56	—	—	—	
Lahouari Beddiar	(Algeria)	DF	1955–71	1962–68	—	—	
Benaouda Boudjellal "Tchengo"	(Algeria)	FW	1962–65	—	—	—	
Mohamed Meguenine	(Algeria)	DF	1962–71	—	—	—	
Abdelkader Fréha	(Algeria)	FW	1962–76	1969–71 ¤	—	—	
Abdelmadjid Belgot	(Algeria)	DF	1963–75	—	—	—	
Miloud Hadefi	(Algeria)	DF	1965–69, 1972–79	1977–79	—	—	
Djelloul Bouhadji	(Algeria)	DF	1967–72	—	—	—	
Noureddine Hammel "Mehdi"	(Algeria)	FW	1967–72, 1973–79	—	—	—	
Haddou Chaïb	(Algeria)	FW	1968–77	—	—	—	
Mohamed Bouhizeb	(Algeria)	FW	1968–78	—	—	—	
Lahouari Chaïb	(Algeria)	DF	1970–84 ^{†}	1980–83 ¤	—	—	
Mohamed Ounes	(Algeria)	GK	1970–77	—	—	—	
Abdellah Kechra	(Algeria)	DF	1970–79	1971–77 ¤	—	—	
Djelloul Djelli	(Algeria)	DF	1970–77	—	—	—	
Sid Ahmed Belkedrouci	(Algeria)	MF	1972–79	—	—	—	
Senouci Medjahed	(Algeria)	MF	1972–80	—	—	—	
Mokhtar Chergui	(Algeria)	DF	1973–86 ^{†}	—	—	—	
Mohammed Habib Benkada	(Algeria)	FW	1976–79	—	—	—	
Mohamed Hadjadji "Chamia"	(Algeria)	GK	1977–83	—	—	—	
Habib Benmimoun	(Algeria)	FW	1977–88, 1989–94	—	—	—	
Bachir Sebaâ	(Algeria)	GK	1977–86	1983–86 ¤	—	—	
Tedj Bensaoula	(Algeria)	FW	1977–83	—	40	20	
Lakhdar Belloumi	(Algeria)	MF	1978–79, 1987–88, 1989–90, 1993–94, 1996	1987–88, 1989–90, 1993–94 ¤	146	67	
Abdelhafid Bellabès	(Algeria)	DF	1978–88 ^{†}	1986–87	—	—	
Benyagoub Sebbah	(Algeria)	MF	1980–95 ^{†}	—	—	—	
Ouanes Mechkour "Siki"	(Algeria)	DF	1982–97	—	—	—	
Boutkhil Benyoucef	(Algeria)	MF	1982–??	—	—	—	
Tahar Chérif El-Ouazzani *	(Algeria)	MF	1983–90, 1992–93, 1995–2002	1996–2002 ¤	—	—	
Mourad Meziane	(Algeria)	FW	1983–92, 1993–98	1993–96 ¤	—	—	
Arezki Lebbah	(Algeria)	DF	1983–??	—	—	—	
Bachir Mecheri	(Algeria)	FW	1984–90, 1991–93, 1998–2000	—	—	—	
El-Hadi Khelili	(Algeria)	FW	1984–85	—	—	—	
Baroudi Berkane-Krachaï	(Algeria)	GK	1984–91	—	—	—	
Nacerdine Drid	(Algeria)	GK	1985–88, 1989–90	—	—	—	
Tayeb Foussi	(Algeria)	DF	1986–96	—	—	—	
Samir Benkenida	(Algeria)	FW	1986–87	—	—	—	
Omar Belatoui	(Algeria)	DF	1987–2002	—	—	—	
Abdelaziz Bott	(Algeria)	DF	1987–90	—	—	—	
Larbi Chaâbane	(Algeria)	MF	1987–90	—	—	—	
Ali Benhalima	(Algeria)	DF	1988–90	—	—	—	
Karim Maroc	(Algeria)	DF	1988–89	—	—	—	
Nacer Benchiha	(Algeria)	GK	1989–??	—	—	—	
Abdelhafid Tasfaout	(Algeria)	MF	1990–95	—	—	—	
Afif Goual	(Algeria)	FW	1990–2000	—	—	—	
Sid Ahmed Zerrouki	(Algeria)	MF	1991–96, 1997–2002, 2004–05	—	—	—	
Abdesslam Benabdellah	(Algeria)	GK	1991–97, 1999–2001	—	—	—	
Mokhtar Kechamli	(Algeria)	DF	1991–92	—	—	—	
Abdelkader Tlemçani	(Algeria)	FW	1993–95	—	—	—	
Boubakeur Chalabi	(Algeria)	DF	1993–95	—	—	—	
Abdelkrim Kherif	(Algeria)	DF	1993–99	—	—	—	
Moulay Haddou	(Algeria)	DF	1993–2004, 2007–08	—	—	—	
Fayçal Megueni	(Algeria)	MF	1994–95	—	—	—	
Naceredine Gaïd	(Algeria)	MF	1994–2004	—	—	—	
Ali Meçabih	(Algeria)	FW	1994–2000, 2002–03, 2005–06	—	—	—	
Reda Acimi	(Algeria)	GK	1995–96, 1997–2004, 2005–07	2002–04	—	—	
Sid-Ahmed Benamara	(Algeria)	GK	1995–99	—	—	—	
Ali Moumen	(Algeria)	GK	1995–2004, 2006–07	—	—	—	
Kouider Boukessassa	(Algeria)	FW	1996–2000, 2003–07, 2010–11	—	—	—	
Kada Kechamli	(Algeria)	DF	1996–2005, 2007–11	—	—	—	
Karim Saoula	(Algeria)	GK	1996–98	—	—	—	
Slimane Raho	(Algeria)	GK	1996–99	—	—	—	
Abdellatif Osmane	(Algeria)	DF	1996–??	—	—	—	
Cheïkh Benzerga	(Algeria)	MF	1997–99, 2001–05, 2008	—	—	—	
Rachid Amrane	(Algeria)	FW	1997–2001	—	—	—	
Brahim Arafat Mezouar	(Algeria)	MF	1997–99, 2006–07, 2008–10	—	46	5	
Zoubir Ouasti	(Algeria)	DF	1999–2005, 2008–11, 2012–13, 2014–15	2012–13	—	—	
Seddik Berradja	(Algeria)	MF	1999–2008, 2010–11, 2012–16	—	214	40	
Mohamed Aït Zeggagh	(Algeria)	GK	1999–2000, 2004–05	—	—	—	
Bouabdellah Daoud	(Algeria)	FW	2001–04, 2005–07, 2009–11	—	143	35	
Sofiane Daoud	(Algeria)	MF	2002–05, 2006–07, 2008–09	—	—	—	
Mohamed Amine Zidane	(Algeria)	DF	2003–05, 2010–13	—	65	0	
Gilles Binya	(Cameroon)	MF	2004–07	—	59	2	
Abdelmadjid Benatia	(Algeria)	MF	2004–06, 2008–12	—	89	4	
Farid Bellabès	(Algeria)	DF	2005–08, 2010–17	—	217	0	
Brahim Arafat Mezouar	(Algeria)	MF	2006–07, 2008–10	—	—	—	
Hicham Mezair	(Algeria)	GK	2006–07, 2008–10, 2012	—	45	0	
Nasereddine El Bahari	(Algeria)	FW	2007–12	—	79	19	
Zine El-Abidine Sebbah	(Algeria)	DF	2007–13, 2016–20	—	199	9	
Ezechiel N'Douassel	(Chad)	FW	2007–08	—	—	—	
Sofiane Bengoureïne	(Algeria)	DF	2008–11	—	54	3	
Sid Ahmed Aouedj	(Algeria)	FW	2009–13, 2019	—	86	16	
Hicham Chérif	(Algeria)	FW	2009–15, 2016–17	—	148	20	
Tayeb Berramla	(Algeria)	MF	2009–10, 2016	—	57	4	
Mohamed Bentiba	(Algeria)	MF	2009–13, 2016–18	—	89	9	
Ahmed Fellah	(Algeria)	GK	2010–12	—	44	0	
Youcef Belaïli	(Algeria)	FW	2010–12	—	48	16	
Abdelkader Harizi	(Algeria)	MF	2011–12	—	24	0	
Eudes Dagoulou	(Central African Republic)	MF	2011–14	—	75	17	
Saidou Sandaogo	(Burkina Faso)	FW	2011–13	—	21	5	
Sofiane Bouterbiat	(Algeria)	MF	2011–14	—	73	0	
Hamza Dahmane	(Algeria)	GK	2012–14	—	31	0	
Mohamed Megherbi	(Algeria)	DF	2012–14	—	12	0	
Arslane Mazari	(Algeria)	DF	2012–13	—	17	0	
Hocine Achiou	(Algeria)	MF	2012–13	—	12	2	
Mohamed Benyettou	(Algeria)	FW	2012–14	—	53	14	
Salim Boumechra	(Algeria)	FW	2012–13	—	23	5	
Mohamed El Amine Aouad	(Algeria)	MF	2012–14, 2016–18	—	98	4	
Hamza Heriat	(Algeria)	MF	2013–15, 2016–20	—	131	0	
Hichem Mokhtari	(Algeria)	FW	2013–14	—	12	1	
Djamel Bouaïcha	(Algeria)	FW	2013–14	—	22	5	
Chemseddine Nessakh	(Algeria)	DF	2013–17	—	101	7	
Lyès Saïdi	(Algeria)	DF	2013–15	—	28	0	
Chadli Amri	(Algeria)	MF	2014	—	8	0	
Abderaouf Natèche	(Algeria)	GK	2014–18	—	124	0	
Abdelmalek Merbah	(Algeria)	DF	2014–16	—	56	0	
Yacine Bezzaz	(Algeria)	MF	2014–15	—	31	3	
Mohamed Zubya	(Libya)	FW	2014, 2015–16	—	38	20	
Hichem Nekkache	(Algeria)	FW	2014–15	—	28	6	
Kamel Larbi	(Algeria)	MF	2014–16	—	56	9	
Walid Athmani	(Algeria)	FW	2014–16	—	26	0	
Hacène El Okbi	(Algeria)	MF	2015–16	—	31	1	
Mohamed Benyahia	(Algeria)	DF	2015–16	—	28	11	
Réda Halaïmia	(Algeria)	DF	2015–19	—	106	0	
Khaled Lemmouchia	(Algeria)	MF	2015–16	—	25	0	
**Abdelhafid Benamara**	(Algeria)	MF	2015–18, 2019–	—	74	1	
Mourad Delhoum	(Algeria)	MF	2016–17	—	24	1	
Rachid Ferrahi	(Algeria)	MF	2016–18	—	50	1	
Mohamed Souibaâh	(Algeria)	FW	2016–17	—	37	9	
**Zineddine Mekkaoui**	(Algeria)	DF	2017–	—	72	3	
Sabri Gharbi	(Algeria)	MF	2017–19	—	47	4	
Mohamed Tiaïba	(Algeria)	FW	2017–18	—	22	9	
Zakaria Mansouri	(Algeria)	MF	2018–20	—	66	14	
Rachid Nadji	(Algeria)	FW	2018–20	—	44	13	
Sid Ahmed Rafik Mazouzi	(Algeria)	GK	2018–20	—	22	0	
Kodjo Doussé	(Mali)	FW	2018	—	6	0	
Vivien Assie	(Ivory Coast)	DF	2019	—	19	2	

Nationalities are indicated by the corresponding FIFA country code.

== List of foreign players ==
^{*}Bold International players.

#	Player	Pos	App	Goal	from	Career	to
1	(Burkina Faso) Issa Balboné	MF			(Burkina Faso) USFA	1999–2002	(Burkina Faso) USFA
2	(Cameroon) Marcel Roger Kibong	MF	21	0	(Cameroon) Coton Sport	1999–2004	(Cameroon) Union Douala
3	(Cameroon) Gilles Binya	MF	59	2	(Cameroon) Tonnerre Yaoundé	2004–2007	(Portugal) Benfica
4	(Cameroon) Joseph Fotso	FW	17	2	(Bosnia and Herzegovina) NK Brotnjo	2004–2007	(Libya) Al-Akhdhar
5	(Liberia) Roberts Sessay	FW			(Algeria) JS Kabylie	2005–2006	(Algeria) ES Sétif
6	(Cameroon) Alain Ketchemen	FW	1	0	(Portugal) Olivais e Moscavide	2008–2009	(Cameroon) Olympique du Littoral
7	(Cameroon) Jean Michel N'Lend	FW	23	14	(Morocco) FUS Rabat	2007–2008	(Slovakia) Dunajská Streda
8	(Chad) Ezechiel N'Douassel	FW	22	10	(Chad) Tourbillon FC	2007–2008	(Algeria) USM Blida
9	(Burkina Faso) Saidou Sandaogo	FW	21	5	(Egypt) Haras El-Hodood SC	2011–2013	(Iraq) Al-Mina'a
10	(Central African Republic) Eudes Dagoulou	MF	55	14	(Gabon) AS Pélican	2011–2014	(Algeria) ES Sétif
11	(France) Hamza Chaïb	MF	2	0	(Malta) Zejtun Corinthians	2013–2014	(France) GS Chasse
12	(Libya) Mohamed Zubya	FW	24	22	(Algeria) JS Kabylie	2014–2016	(Tunisia) ES Tunis
13	(Cameroon) Cédric N'Doumbé	MF	2	0	(France) Trélissac	2015	(France) AS Cherbourg
–	(Democratic Republic of the Congo) Jean-Marc Makusu Mundele	FW	0	0	(Belgium) Standard Liège	2015	(Democratic Republic of the Congo) AS Vita Club
–	(The Gambia) Alieu Darbo	MF	0	0	(Malta) Mosta	2015	(Egypt) Al-Ittihad Alexandria
14	(Mali) Kodjo Doussé	FW	6	0	(Mali) Real Bamako	2018	(Mali) Real Bamako
15	(Ivory Coast) Vivien Assie	DF	19	2	(Qatar) Al-Arabi	2019	(Kuwait) Kazma
–	(Burundi) Bienvenue Shaka	FW	0	0	(Kenya) AFC Leopards	2021	(Burundi) Aigle Noir FC
16	(Cameroon) Tony Abega	FW	2	0	(Czech Republic) MFK Vyškov	2021	Free
–	(Cameroon) Boris Emah Atcham	MF	0	0	(Cameroon) Niefang FC	2021	Free
17	(Ghana) Maxwell Baakoh	MF	30	2	(Algeria) USM Khenchela	2024–2025	Free
18	(Ivory Coast) Sery Gnoleba	MF	7	0	(Ivory Coast) ASEC Mimosas	2024	(Ivory Coast) Stade d'Abidjan
19	(Ivory Coast) Mohamed Sylla	FW	18	1	(Ivory Coast) RC Abidjan	2024–2025	(Algeria) ES Ben Aknoun
20	(The Gambia) Pa Omar Jobe	FW	20	3	(Northern Cyprus) Çetinkaya TSK	2025	(Iraq) Zakho SC
21	(Mauritania) Sid'Ahmed Ablla	DF	5	0	(Democratic Republic of the Congo) AS Vita Club	2025	(Libya) Al-Andalus SC
22	(Botswana) Gape Mohutsiwa	MF	25	1	(Algeria) ASO Chlef	2025–2026	(Morocco) IR Tangier
23	(Guinea) Sékou Damaro Bangoura	FW	7	0	(Guinea) Hafia FC	2026	Free
24	(Guinea) Ousmane Coumbassa	MF			(Luxembourg) F91 Dudelange	2026–	
25	(Mali) Boubacar Traoré	FW			(Libya) Al Ahly Benghazi	2026–	
26	(Gabon) Edlin Essang-Matouti	FW			(Algeria) USM Khenchela	2026–	
27	(Gabon) Oumar Bagnama	DF			(Gabon) AS Mangasport	2026–	

== Players in international competitions ==
=== World Cup Players ===
(Spain) World Cup 1982

- (Algeria) Tedj Bensaoula

(Mexico) World Cup 1986

- (Algeria) Nacerdine Drid

=== Olympic Players ===
(Soviet Union) 1980 Summer Olympics

- (Algeria) Tedj Bensaoula

=== Africa Cup of Nations Players ===
(Ethiopia) 1968 African Cup of Nations

- (Algeria) Hamid Belabbes

(Nigeria) 1980 African Cup of Nations

- (Algeria) Tedj Bensaoula

(Egypt) 1986 African Cup of Nations

- (Algeria) Nacerdine Drid

(Morocco) 1988 African Cup of Nations

- (Algeria) Lakhdar Belloumi
- (Algeria) Nacerdine Drid

(Algeria) 1990 African Cup of Nations

- (Algeria) Ali Benhalima
- (Algeria) Tahar Chérif El-Ouazzani

(Senegal) 1992 African Cup of Nations

- (Algeria) Omar Belatoui
- (Algeria) Abdelhafid Tasfaout

(South Africa) 1996 African Cup of Nations

- (Algeria) Omar Belatoui
- (Algeria) Ali Meçabih
- (Algeria) Sid Ahmed Zerrouki

(Burkina Faso) 1998 African Cup of Nations

- (Algeria) Sid-Ahmed Benamara
- (Algeria) Cheïkh Benzerga
- (Algeria) Abdellatif Osmane

(Ghana) (Nigeria) 2000 African Cup of Nations

- (Algeria) Abdesslam Benabdellah
- (Algeria) Moulay Haddou
- (Algeria) Ali Meçabih

(Mali) 2002 African Cup of Nations

- (Algeria) Moulay Haddou

(Tunisia) 2004 African Cup of Nations

- (Algeria) Moulay Haddou

(Morocco) 2025 Africa Cup of Nations

- (Botswana) Gape Mohutsiwa
