= 2012–13 MC Oran season =

MC Oran
2012–13 season
- Chairman: Youcef Djebbari
- Head coach: Luc Eymael (until 4 September 2012); Raoul Savoy (from 6 September 2012) (until 9 October 2012); Abdellah Mecheri (from 11 October 2012) (until 5 November 2012); Djamel Benchadli (from 5 November 2012) (until 10 January 2013); Tahar Chérif El-Ouazzani (from 11 January 2013) (until 16 February 2013); Sid Ahmed Slimani (from 18 February 2013)
- Stadium: Stade Ahmed Zabana
- Ligue 1: 12th
- Algerian Cup: Semi-final
- Top goalscorer: League: Eudes Dagoulou (6); All: Eudes Dagoulou (8); Mohamed Benyettou (8)
Home colours	Away colours

In the 2012–13 season, MC Oran competed in the Ligue 1 for the 47th season, as well as the Algerian Cup.

== Squad list ==
Players and squad numbers last updated on 18 November 2012.
Note: Flags indicate national team as has been defined under FIFA eligibility rules. Players may hold more than one non-FIFA nationality.

No.	Nat.	Position	Name	Date of Birth (Age)	Signed from
Goalkeepers
1	(Algeria)	GK	Hamza Dahmane	22 September 1990 (aged 22)	(Algeria) CR Belouizdad
16	(Algeria)	GK	Mohamed Ferradji	22 August 1975 (aged 37)	(Algeria) CS Constantine
26	(Algeria)	GK	Mohamed Reda Ouamane	22 June 1983 (aged 29)	(Algeria) Youth system
Defenders
3	(Algeria)	CB	Mohamed Megherbi	6 May 1984 (aged 28)	(Algeria) MC Alger
4	(Algeria)	CB	Farid Bellabès	20 October 1985 (aged 27)	(Algeria) Youth system
5	(Algeria)	CB	Arslane Mazari	6 January 1989 (aged 23)	(Algeria) ASM Oran
8	(Algeria)	CB	Mohamed Amine Zidane	5 October 1983 (aged 29)	(Algeria) Youth system
15	(Algeria)	CB	Zine El-Abidine Sebbah	22 March 1987 (aged 25)	(Algeria) Youth system
18	(Algeria)	LB	Amar Layati	19 August 1984 (aged 28)	(Algeria) USM El Harrach
20	(Algeria)	RB	Benziane Senouci	5 October 1981 (aged 31)	(Algeria) ASO Chlef
22	(Algeria)	RB	Chafik Bourzama	5 July 1984 (aged 28)	(Algeria) CRB Aïn Turck
42	(Algeria)	CB	Zoubir Ouasti	28 February 1981 (aged 31)	(Algeria) ASM Oran
90	(Algeria)	CB	Houssam Bouazza Krachaï	14 January 1993 (aged 19)	(Algeria) ASM Oran
Midfielders
6	(Algeria)	DM	Sofiane Bouterbiat	5 December 1983 (aged 29)	(Algeria) USM Annaba
11	(Algeria)	AM	Mohamed Amine Aouad	20 September 1984 (aged 28)	(Algeria) CR Belouizdad
12	(Algeria)	LM	Seddik Berradja	20 September 1983 (aged 29)	(Algeria) MC Alger
14	(Algeria)	AM	Hocine Achiou	27 April 1979 (aged 33)	(Algeria) ASO Chlef
19	(Central African Republic)	AM	Eudes Dagoulou	9 February 1990 (aged 22)	(Gabon) AS Pélican
21	(Algeria)	RM	Lakhdar Bentaleb	8 October 1988 (aged 24)	(Algeria) ES Sétif
24	(France)	DM	Hamza Chaïb	8 October 1992 (aged 20)	(Malta) Żejtun Corinthians
25	(Algeria)	RM	Mohamed Bentiba	21 October 1989 (aged 23)	(Algeria) Youth system
36	(Algeria)	RM	Ilyès Kadri	1 January 1992 (aged 21)	(Algeria) Youth system
Forwards
7	(Algeria)	CF	Hicham Chérif	1 January 1992 (aged 21)	(Algeria) Youth system
41	(Algeria)	LW	Ilyès Kouriba	9 November 1992 (aged 20)	(Algeria) ES Sétif
9	(Algeria)	CF	Mohamed Benyettou	1 November 1989 (aged 23)	(Algeria) USM El Harrach
10	(Algeria)	AM	Salim Boumechra	28 April 1983 (aged 29)	(Algeria) USM Alger
21	(Algeria)	CF	Fouad Bouguerra	7 May 1981 (aged 31)	(Algeria) CS Constantine
29	(Burkina Faso)	LW	Saidou Sandaogo	12 January 1988 (aged 24)	(Burkina Faso) EF Ouagadougou
37	(Algeria)	CF	Mohamed Feddal	11 April 1985 (aged 27)	(Algeria) Youth system
89	(Algeria)	LM	Sid Ahmed Aouedj	7 July 1991 (aged 21)	(Algeria) Youth system

== Competitions ==
=== Overview ===
Competition	Record								Started round	Final position / round	First match	Last match
Competition	G	W	D	L	GF	GA	GD	Win %	Started round	Final position / round	First match	Last match
Ligue 1	30	8	10	12	33	41	−8	26.67	—N/a	12th	15 September 2012	21 May 2013
Algerian Cup	5	4	0	1	13	3	+10	80.00	Round of 64	Semi-final	14 December 2012	13 April 2013
Total	35	12	10	13	46	44	+2	34.29				

Updated to match played 9 May 2017
Source: Competitions

== League table ==
Pos	Team	Pld	W	D	L	GF	GA	GD	Pts	Qualification or relegation
10	ASO Chlef	30	10	8	12	26	29	−3	38	
11	JSM Béjaïa	30	9	11	10	28	32	−4	38	
12	MC Oran	30	8	10	12	33	41	−8	34	
13	CA Bordj Bou Arréridj	30	7	12	11	20	26	−6	33	
14	CA Batna (R)	30	6	8	16	20	46	−26	26	Relegation to Ligue Professionnelle 2

Updated to match(es) played on 21 May 2013. Source: DZFoot
Rules for classification: 1) points; 2) head-to-head points; 3) head-to-head goal difference; 4) goal difference; 5) total goals; 6) fairplay ranking; 7) playoff.
(R) Relegated

=== Results summary ===
Overall								Home						Away					
Pld	W	D	L	GF	GA	GD	Pts	W	D	L	GF	GA	GD	W	D	L	GF	GA	GD
30	8	10	12	33	41	−8	34	6	7	2	21	14	+7	2	3	10	12	27	−15

Last updated: 29 December 2014.
Source: Competitive matches

=== Results by round ===
Round	1	2	3	4	5	6	7	8	9	10	11	12	13	14	15	16	17	18	19	20	21	22	23	24	25	26	27	28	29	30
Ground	H	A	H	A	H	A	H	A	H	A	H	A	H	A	H	A	H	A	H	A	H	A	H	A	H	A	H	A	H	A
Result	L	L	D	D	D	D	L	L	D	L	W	L	W	L	W	W	D	L	D	L	D	L	W	L	W	L	W	W	D	D
Position	15	15	15	15	15	14	15	16	14	14	14	15	13	14	13	13	13	13	13	12	13	14	13	13	13	13	13	13	13	13

Source: Competitive matches
A = Away; H = Home; W = Win; D = Draw; L = Loss

=== Matches ===
15 September 2012 Round 1	MC Oran	0–2	JSM Béjaïa	Oran
18:00		Report	50' Boussaha; 87' Zerara	Stadium: Ahmed Zabana Stadium; Referee: Rafik Achouri

18 September 2012 Round 2	CS Constantine	4–3	MC Oran	Constantine
18:00	Benhadj 4'; Boulemdaïs 31', 62'; Bezzaz 39'	Report	19' Kouriba; 42' Chérif; 82' Aoued	Stadium: Stade Mohamed Hamlaoui; Referee: Mohamed Bichari

22 September 2012 Round 3	MC Oran	1–1	USM Bel-Abbès	Oran
17:45	Dagoulou 67'	Report	38' Boukhari	Stadium: Ahmed Zabana Stadium; Referee: Boubekeur Zouaoui

29 September 2012 Round 4	JS Kabylie	0–0	MC Oran	Tizi Ouzou
18:00		Report		Stadium: Stade du 1er Novembre 1954; Referee: Said Aouina

6 October 2012 Round 5	MC Oran	1–1	CR Belouizdad	Oran
18:00	Dagoulou 49'	Report	42' Slimani	Stadium: Ahmed Zabana Stadium; Referee: Rafik Achouri

16 October 2012 Round 6	CA Bordj Bou Arreridj	1–1	MC Oran	Bordj Bou Arréridj
18:00	Bekhtaoui 35'	Report	21' Sebbah	Stadium: Stade 20 Août 1955; Referee: Sofiane Bousseter

20 October 2012 Round 7	MC Oran	0–2	ES Sétif	Oran
18:00		Report	24' Djahnit; 90' Soltani	Stadium: Ahmed Zabana Stadium; Referee: Farouk Houasnia

23 October 2012 Round 8	MC El Eulma	3–0	MC Oran	El Eulma
17:45	Gharbi 26'; Abbes 74'; Tiaïba 78'	Report		Stadium: Stade Messaoud Zougar; Referee: Redouane Necib

3 November 2012 Round 9	MC Oran	2–2	MC Alger	Oran
18:00	Bourzama 24'; Sandaogo 90+4'	Report	50' Metref; 85' Yalaoui	Stadium: Ahmed Zabana Stadium; Referee: Farouk Mial

10 November 2012 Round 10	USM El Harrach	3–0	MC Oran	Algiers
15:00	Bounedjah 8'; Amada 78'; Lamali 88'	Report		Stadium: Stade 1er Novembre 1954; Referee: Saïd Aouina

16 November 2012 Round 11	MC Oran	3–1	CA Batna	Oran
16:00	Dagoulou 27', 79'; Aouedj 82'	Report	85' El Hadi	Stadium: Ahmed Zabana Stadium; Referee: Mokhtar Amalou

27 November 2012 Round 12	USM Alger	1–0	MC Oran	Algiers
18:00	Daham 83'	Report		Stadium: Stade Omar Hamadi; Referee: Mehdi Abid Charef

1 December 2012 Round 13	MC Oran	1–0	JS Saoura	Oran
18:00	Sandaogo 49'	Report		Stadium: Ahmed Zabana Stadium; Referee: Abderrazek Hallalchi

8 December 2012 Round 14	ASO Chlef	1–0	MC Oran	Chlef
15:00	Nessakh 55'	Report		Stadium: Stade Mohamed Boumezrag; Referee: Boubekeur Zouaoui

22 December 2012 Round 15	MC Oran	2–0	WA Tlemcen	Oran
18:00	Benyettou 89'; Aouedj 90+2'	Report		Stadium: Ahmed Zabana Stadium; Referee: Sofiane Bousseter

15 January 2013 Round 16	JSM Béjaïa	0–1	MC Oran	Béjaïa
18:00		Report	85' Berradja	Stadium: Stade de l'Unité Maghrébine; Attendance: 0 (close doors); Referee: Mehdi Abid Charef

19 January 2013 Round 17	MC Oran	1–1	CS Constantine	Oran
15:00	Chérif 51'	Report	36' Tiaïba	Stadium: Ahmed Zabana Stadium; Referee: Mokhtar Amalou

26 January 2013 Round 18	USM Bel-Abbès	1–0	MC Oran	Sidi Bel Abbès
15:00	Belhadi 2'	Report		Stadium: Stade 24 Fevrier 1956; Attendance: 0 (close doors); Referee: Redouane Necib

2 February 2013 Round 19	MC Oran	1–1	JS Kabylie	Oran
18:00	Achiou 40'	Report	45' Maïza	Stadium: Ahmed Zabana Stadium; Referee: Boubekeur Zouaoui

8 February 2013 Round 20	CR Belouizdad	1–0	MC Oran	Belouizdad
15:00	Slimani 35'	Report		Stadium: Stade 20 Août 1955; Referee: Farouk Mial

16 February 2013 Round 21	MC Oran	0–0	CA Bordj Bou Arreridj	Oran
15:00		Report		Stadium: Ahmed Zabana Stadium; Referee: Farouk Houasnia

23 February 2013 Round 22	ES Sétif	4–1	MC Oran	Sétif
18:00	Madouni 26'; Delhoum 30'; Lakhdari 74'; Nadji 79'	Report	17' Chérif	Stadium: Stade 8 Mai 1945; Referee: Mokhtar Amalou

9 March 2013 Round 23	MC Oran	4–1	MC El Eulma	Oran
15:00	Berradja 23' Boumechra 47'; Benyettou 61'; Aouedj 70'	Report	20' Chenihi	Stadium: Stade Habib Bouakeul; Referee: Sofiane Bousseter

19 March 2013 Round 24	MC Alger	2–0	MC Oran	Algiers
15:00	Djallit 18' (pen.); Attafen 88'	Report		Stadium: July 5, 1962 Stadium; Referee: Boubekeur Zouaoui

6 April 2013 Round 25	MC Oran	1–0	USM El Harrach	Oran
16:00	Dagoulou 38'	Report		Stadium: Stade Habib Bouakeul; Referee: Mehdi Abid Charef

20 April 2013 Round 26	CA Batna	2–1	MC Oran	Batna
15:00	Merazka 65', 83'	Report	85' Benyettou	Stadium: November 1, 1954 Stadium; Referee: Mokhtar Amalou

7 May 2013 Round 27	MC Oran	2–0	USM Alger	Oran
17:00	Aouedj 17', 57'	Report		Stadium: Stade Habib Bouakeul; Referee: Rafik Achouri

11 May 2013 Round 28	JS Saoura	2–3	MC Oran	Béchar
17:00	Metrani 81', 89'	Report	5' Benyettou; 12' Dagoulou; 33' Achiou	Stadium: Stade 20 Août 1955; Referee: Farouk Houasnia

18 May 2013 Round 29	MC Oran	2–2	ASO Chlef	Oran
17:00	M.Sebbah 35'; Aouedj 77' (pen.)	Report	55' Ali Hadji; 67' Merzougi	Stadium: Habib Bouakeul Stadium; Referee: Said Aouina

21 May 2013 Round 30	WA Tlemcen	2–2	MC Oran	Tlemcen
17:00	Djarbou 18'; Sameur 77' (pen.)	Report	18' (pen.), 86' Boumechra	Stadium: Stade Akid Lotfi; Referee: Mohamed Bachir

== Algerian Cup ==
14 December 2012 Round of 64	JSM Skikda	1–4	MC Oran	Skikda
14:30	Lasmi 80'	Report	1' Boumechra; 45+2', 58' Dagoulou; 87' Benyettou	Stadium: Stade Abdelhafid Bouteldja; Attendance: 15,000; Referee: Salah Eddine Hellal

28 December 2012 Round of 32	MC Oran	4–0	IRB Hadjar	Oran
15:00	Benyettou 7', 68'; Kouriba 21'; Sebbah 90'	Report		Stadium: Stade Ahmed Zabana; Attendance: 20,000; Referee: Amine Sekhraoui

1 March 2013 Round of 16	MC Oran	2–0	ASO Chlef	Oran
15:00	Benyettou 13'; Zidane 68'	Report		Stadium: Habib Bouakeul Stadium; Attendance: 15,000; Referee: Redouane Necib

29 March 2013 Quarter-finals	MC Oran	3–1	WA Tlemcen	Oran
15:00	Aoued 23'; Boumechra 60'; Aouedj 70'	Report	72' Sameur	Stadium: Habib Bouakeul Stadium; Attendance: 15,000; Referee: Farouk Houasnia

13 April 2013 Semi-finals	MC Oran	0–1	USM Alger	Oran
17:00		Report	18' Daham	Stadium: Stade Ahmed Zabana; Attendance: 40,000; Referee: Redouane Necib

== Squad information ==
=== Playing statistics ===
No.	Pos	Nat	Player	Total		Ligue 1		Algerian Cup	
No.	Pos	Nat	Player	Apps	Goals	Apps	Goals	Apps	Goals
Goalkeepers
16	GK	(Algeria) ALG	Mohamed Seghir Ferradji	11	0	8	0	3	0
26	GK	(Algeria) ALG	Mohamed Reda Ouamane	1	0	1	0	0	0
16	GK	(Algeria) ALG	Hichem Mezaïr	3	0	3	0	0	0
1	GK	(Algeria) ALG	Hamza Dahmane	20	0	18	0	2	0
Defenders
	DF	(Algeria) ALG	Abderraouf Zarabi	2	0	2	0	0	0
8	DF	(Algeria) ALG	Mohamed Amine Zidane	21	1	18	0	3	1
20	DF	(Algeria) ALG	Benziane Senouci	13	0	10	0	3	0
4	DF	(Algeria) ALG	Farid Bellabès	31	0	28	0	3	0
18	DF	(Algeria) ALG	Amar Layati	17	0	15	0	2	0
42	DF	(Algeria) ALG	Zoubir Ouasti	6	0	4	0	2	0
15	DF	(Algeria) ALG	Zine El-Abidine Sebbah	24	3	20	2	4	1
3	DF	(Algeria) ALG	Mohamed Megherbi	9	0	8	0	1	0
5	DF	(Algeria) ALG	Arslane Mazari	17	0	13	0	4	0
22	DF	(Algeria) ALG	Chaffik Bourzama	16	1	16	1	0	0
90	DF	(Algeria) ALG	Bouazza Krachaï	4	0	4	0	0	0
	DF	(Algeria) ALG	Mokhtar Azemani	1	0	1	0	0	0
Midfielders
14	MF	(Algeria) ALG	Hocine Achiou	12	2	10	2	2	0
12	MF	(Algeria) ALG	Seddik Berradja	30	2	25	2	5	0
11	MF	(Algeria) ALG	Mohamed El Amine Aouad	30	2	25	1	5	1
25	MF	(Algeria) ALG	Mohamed Bentiba	7	0	7	0	0	0
6	MF	(Algeria) ALG	Sofiane Bouterbiat	27	0	25	0	2	0
19	MF	(Central African Republic) CAF	Eudes Dagoulou	22	8	19	6	3	2
23	MF	(Algeria) ALG	Lakhdar Bentaleb	18	0	14	0	4	0
24	MF	(Algeria) ALG	Hamza Chaïb	2	0	2	0	0	0
	MF	(Algeria) ALG	Oussama Zine Tedj Sabri	1	0	1	0	0	0
	MF	(Algeria) ALG	Bouazza	2	0	1	0	1	0
Forwards
10	FW	(Algeria) ALG	Salim Boumechra	23	5	19	3	4	2
21	FW	(Algeria) ALG	Fouad Bouguerra	9	0	7	0	2	0
41	FW	(Algeria) ALG	Ilyes Kourbia	21	2	17	1	4	1
34	FW	(Algeria) ALG	Hicham Chérif	25	3	22	3	3	0
89	FW	(Algeria) ALG	Sid Ahmed Aouedj	26	7	23	6	3	1
	FW	(Algeria) ALG	Hamouda Fedel	1	0	1	0	0	0
9	FW	(Algeria) ALG	Mohamed Benyettou	21	8	16	4	5	4
29	FW	(Burkina Faso) BFA	Saidou Sandaogo	13	2	13	2	0	0
	FW	(Algeria) ALG	Salah Yahia	1	0	1	0	0	0
Players transferred out during the season

Last updated: 25 November 2017
Source: fr.soccerway.com

== Transfers ==
=== In ===
Date	Pos	Player	From club	Transfer fee	Source
21 June 2012	MF	(Algeria) Seddik Berradja	MC Alger	Undisclosed	
21 June 2012	MF	(Algeria) Salim Boumechra	USM Alger	Undisclosed	
21 June 2012	DF	(Algeria) Arslane Mazari	ASM Oran	Undisclosed	
21 June 2012	DF	(Algeria) Mohamed Megherbi	MC Alger	Undisclosed	
25 June 2012	DF	(Algeria) Benziane Senouci	ASO Chlef	Undisclosed	
1 July 2012	MF	(Algeria) Lakhdar Bentaleb	ES Sétif	Undisclosed	
1 July 2012	DF	(Algeria) Amar Layati	USM El Harrach	Undisclosed	
1 July 2012	DF	(Algeria) Bouazza Krachaï	ASM Oran	Undisclosed	
4 July 2012	MF	(Algeria) Mohamed El Amine Aouad	CR Belouizdad	Undisclosed	
25 July 2012	FW	(Algeria) Mohamed Benyettou	USM El Harrach	Free transfer	
1 August 2012	GK	(Algeria) Hamza Dahmane	CR Belouizdad	Undisclosed	
1 August 2012	GK	(Algeria) Hichem Mezaïr	ASM Oran	Undisclosed	
1 August 2012	MF	(Algeria) Salah Yahia	CRB Sendjas	First Professional Contract	
14 August 2012	DF	(Algeria) Zoubir Ouasti	ASM Oran	Undisclosed	
3 January 2013	MF	(Algeria) (France) Hamza Chaïb	(Malta) Zejtun Corinthians FC	Undisclosed	
5 January 2013	GK	(Algeria) Mohamed Seghir Ferradji	Unattached	Free transfer	
10 January 2013	MF	(Algeria) Hocine Achiou	ASO Chlef	Undisclosed	
10 January 2013	DF	(Algeria) Abderraouf Zarabi	CS Constantine	Undisclosed	
20 January 2013	FW	(Algeria) Fouad Bouguerra	Unattached	Undisclosed	

=== Out ===
Date	Pos	Player	To club	Transfer fee	Source
5 June 2012	MF	(Algeria) Youcef Belaïli	(Tunisia) ES Tunis	€700,000	
?	MF	(Algeria) Abdelmadjid Benatia	USM Bel-Abbès	Free transfer	
?	DF	(Algeria) Hachemi Boussaâda	ASM Oran	Free transfer	
?	MF	(Algeria) Sid Ahmed Fayçal Briki	CR Témouchent	Free transfer	
?	FW	(Algeria) Nasereddine El Bahari	USM Bel-Abbès	Free transfer	
?	GK	(Algeria) Ahmed Fellah	CA Bordj Bou Arreridj	Free transfer	
?	MF	(Algeria) Abdelkader Harizi	MC El Eulma	Free transfer	
?	DF	(Algeria) Yacine Kechout	US Oued Amizour	Free transfer	
?	MF	(Algeria) Nassim Boukmacha	JSM Béjaïa	Loan	
?	MF	(Algeria) Brahim Boussehaba	CR Belouizdad	Loan	
?	DF	(Algeria) Omar Slimi	NA Hussein Dey	Free transfer (Released)	
?	FW	(Algeria) Salah Yahia	CRB Aïn Turk	Free transfer	
?	DF	(Algeria) Mohamed Tahar	ASM Oran	Free transfer	
?	MF	(Algeria) Touhami Tiah	Unattached	Free transfer	
?	GK	(Algeria) Hichem Mezaïr	ASM Oran	Free transfer (Released)	
?	DF	(Algeria) Abderraouf Zarabi	Unattached	Free transfer (Released)	
