= 2014–15 MC Oran season =

MC Oran
2014–15 season
- Chairman: Ahmed "Baba" Belhadj
- Head coach: Jean-Michel Cavalli
- Stadium: Stade Ahmed Zabana
- Ligue 1: 3rd
- Algerian Cup: Round of 16
- Top goalscorer: League: Mohammad Za'abia (4); Hichem Nekkache (4); All: Hichem Nekkache (6)
Home colours	Away colours

In the 2014–15 season, MC Oran competed in the Ligue 1 for the 49th season, as well as the Algerian Cup.

== Squad list ==
Players and squad numbers last updated on 18 November 2014.
Note: Flags indicate national team as has been defined under FIFA eligibility rules. Players may hold more than one non-FIFA nationality..

No.	Nat.	Position	Name	Date of birth (age)	Signed from
Goalkeepers
1	(Algeria)	GK	Abderaouf Natèche	16 October 1982 (aged 32)	(Algeria) CS Constantine
18	(Algeria)	GK	Abdellah Belarbi	17 March 1983 (aged 31)	(Algeria) ES Mostaganem
Defenders
17	(Algeria)	RB	Farid Bellabès	20 October 1985 (aged 29)	(Algeria) USM Alger
21	(Algeria)	RB	Abdelmalek Merbah	19 May 1985 (aged 29)	(Algeria) JS Kabylie
22	(Algeria)	RB	Chafik Bourzama	5 July 1984 (aged 30)	(Algeria) CRB Aïn Turck
30	(Algeria)	RB	Chemseddine Nessakh	4 January 1988 (aged 26)	(Algeria) ASO Chlef
31	(Algeria)	RB	Hamza Hamdadou	13 July 1990 (aged 24)	(Algeria) CA Bordj Bou Arreridj
41	(Algeria)	RB	Adel Djadane	23 June 1993 (aged 21)	Youth system
93	(Algeria)	RB	Hassouna Benchaïb	30 March 1993 (aged 21)	Youth system
99	(Algeria)	RB	Lyès Saïdi	24 August 1987 (aged 27)	(Algeria) ASO Chlef
-	(Algeria)	RB	Zoubir Ouasti	28 February 1981 (aged 33)	(Algeria) RC Relizane
Midfielders
8	(Algeria)	CM	Sofiane Ammour	12 April 1986 (aged 28)	(Algeria) CA Bordj Bou Arreridj
10	(Algeria)	CM	Yacine Bezzaz	10 August 1981 (aged 33)	(Algeria) CS Constantine
12	(Algeria)	CM	Seddik Berradja	20 September 1983 (aged 31)	(Algeria) MC Alger
26	(Algeria)	CM	Hamza Heriat	6 September 1987 (aged 27)	(Algeria) CA Batna
86	(Algeria)	CM	Bilal Bahloul	28 March 1986 (aged 28)	(Algeria) CS Constantine
96	(Algeria)	CM	Sofiane Chlaoua	27 July 1993 (aged 21)	Youth system
-	(Cameroon)	CM	Cédric N'Doumbé	11 October 1990 (aged 24)	(France) Trélissac FC
Forwards
7	(Algeria)	RW	Mohamed Hicham Chérif	1 January 1992 (aged 23)	Youth system
9	(Democratic Republic of the Congo)	RW	Jean-Marc Makusu Mundele	27 March 1992 (aged 22)	(Belgium) Standard Liège
13	(Algeria)	RW	Kamel Larbi	20 February 1985 (aged 29)	(France) EF Saint-Raphaël
15	(Algeria)	RW	Abdelatif Benamar	4 June 1991 (aged 23)	(Algeria) CR Temouchent
19	(Algeria)	RW	Walid Athmani	19 April 1992 (aged 22)	(Algeria) ASM Oran
33	(Algeria)	RW	Hichem Nekkache	7 March 1991 (aged 23)	(Algeria) Paradou AC
38	(Algeria)	RW	Hichem Mokhtari	24 October 1991 (aged 23)	(Algeria) USM Alger
94	(Algeria)	RW	Mounir Fekih	1 January 1994 (aged 21)	Youth system

== Competitions ==
=== Overview ===
Competition	Record								Started round	Final position / round	First match	Last match
Competition	G	W	D	L	GF	GA	GD	Win %	Started round	Final position / round	First match	Last match
Ligue 1	30	11	11	8	19	19	+0	36.67	—N/a	3rd	16 August 2014	9 May 2015
Algerian Cup	3	2	1	0	5	1	+4	66.67	Round of 64	Round of 16	13 December 2014	21 February 2015
Total	33	13	12	8	24	20	+4	39.39				

=== Ligue 1 ===
==== League table ====
Pos	Team	Pld	W	D	L	GF	GA	GD	Pts	Qualification or relegation
1	ES Sétif (C)	30	13	9	8	37	28	+9	48	2016 CAF Champions League
2	MO Béjaïa	30	12	11	7	36	23	+13	47	2016 CAF Champions League
3	MC Oran	30	11	11	8	19	19	0	44	2016 CAF Confederation Cup
4	USM El Harrach	30	13	4	13	30	32	−2	43	
5	CS Constantine	30	11	9	10	32	31	+1	42 (Note: CSC 3-1 CRB; CRB 1-1 CSC)	2016 CAF Confederation Cup

Updated to match(es) played on 29 May 2015. Source: DZFoot
Rules for classification: 1) points; 2) head-to-head points; 3) head-to-head goal difference; 4) goal difference; 5) total goals; 6) fairplay ranking; 7) playoff
(C) Champions

==== Results summary ====
Overall								Home						Away					
Pld	W	D	L	GF	GA	GD	Pts	W	D	L	GF	GA	GD	W	D	L	GF	GA	GD
30	11	11	8	19	19	0	44	8	6	1	14	7	+7	3	5	7	5	12	−7

Last updated: 29 December 2014.
Source: Competitive matches

==== Results by round ====
Round	1	2	3	4	5	6	7	8	9	10	11	12	13	14	15	16	17	18	19	20	21	22	23	24	25	26	27	28	29	30
Ground	H	A	H	A	H	H	A	H	A	H	A	H	A	H	A	A	H	A	H	A	A	H	A	H	A	H	A	H	A	H
Result	L	L	W	L	W	W	D	W	L	W	D	D	D	D	W	W	D	L	W	D	L	D	W	D	L	L	D	D	L	W
Position	16	16	10	15	12	6	9	4	6	3	5	6	6	6	9	3	3	5	3	3	5	5	4	4	5	3	3	3	5	3

Updated to match(es) played on 29 December 2014. Source: Competitive matches
A = Away; H = Home; W = Win; D = Draw; L = Loss

==== Matches ====
16 August 2014 1	MC Oran	0–2	JS Kabylie	Oran
19:00		Report	30' Ebossé; 55' Moulaye Ahmed	Stadium: Stade Ahmed Zabana; Referee: Mehdi Abid Charef

22 August 2014 2	CR Belouizdad	1–0	MC Oran	Algiers
17:45	Djediat 45'	Report		Stadium: Stade 20 Août 1955; Referee: Redouane Necib

13 September 2014 3	MC Oran	2–0	RC Arbaâ	Oran
19:00	Nekkache 33'; Ali Guechi 77' (o.g.)	Report		Stadium: Stade Ahmed Zabana; Referee: Said Aouina

19 September 2014 4	USM El Harrach	2–0	MC Oran	Algiers
16:00	Mazari 20'; Abid 66'	Report		Stadium: Stade 1er Novembre 1954; Referee: Mohamed Bichari

27 September 2014 5	MC Oran	2–1	CS Constantine	Oran
19:00	Za'abia 8'; Nekkache 41'	Report	75' Voavy	Stadium: Stade Ahmed Zabana; Referee: Farouk Mial

11 October 2014 6	MC Oran	1–0	NA Hussein Dey	Oran
19:00	Za'abia 73'	Report		Stadium: Stade Ahmed Zabana; Referee: Abdelkrim Bouchama

18 October 2014 7	USM Alger	1–1	MC Oran	Algiers
19:00	Meftah 17'; Seguer (yellow card) 39'; Chafaï (yellow card) 89'	Report	89' (pen.) Bezzaz; (yellow card) 41' Merbah; (yellow card) 54' Nessakh	Stadium: Stade Omar Hammadi; Referee: Boubekeur Zouaoui

25 October 2014 8	MC Oran	2–1	MC El Eulma	Oran
17:45	Chérif 20'; Za'abia 46'	Report	24' Chenihi	Stadium: Stade Ahmed Zabana; Referee: Benslimane, Rimouche, Belbachir

1 November 2014 9	USM Bel-Abbès	1–0	MC Oran	Sidi Bel Abbès
16:00	Achiou 7'	Report		Stadium: Stade 24 Fevrier 1956; Attendance: 0 (close doors); Referee: Lotfi Bekouassa

8 November 2014 10	MC Oran	1–0	ASO Chlef	Oran
16:00	Nekkache 89'	Report		Stadium: Stade Ahmed Zabana; Referee: Abderrezzak Arab

22 November 2014 11	JS Saoura	0–0	MC Oran	Béchar
15:00		Report		Stadium: Stade 20 Août 1955; Referee: Lahlou Benbraham

29 November 2014 12	MC Oran	1–1	MO Béjaïa	Oran
18:00	Za'abia 47'	Report	25' Zerdab	Stadium: Stade Ahmed Zabana; Attendance: 0 (close doors); Referee: Said Aouina

6 December 2014 13	ASM Oran	0–0	MC Oran	Oran
16:00		Report		Stadium: Stade Ahmed Zabana; Attendance: 0 (close doors); Referee: Mokhtar Amalou

20 December 2014 14	MC Oran	1–1	MC Alger	Oran
16:00	Larbi 22'	Report	90' (pen.) Gourmi	Stadium: Stade Ahmed Zabana; Attendance: 0 (close doors); Referee: Rafik Achouri

16 January 2014 15	ES Sétif	1–2	MC Oran	Sétif
16:00	Ziaya 90'	Report	56' Chérif; 74' Larbi	Stadium: Stade 8 Mai 1945; Referee: Farouk Mial

20 January 2015 16	JS Kabylie	0–1	MC Oran	Algiers
15:00		Report	25' Chérif	Stadium: Stade 1er Novembre 1954; Attendance: 0 (close doors); Referee: Lotfi Bekouassa

24 January 2015 17	MC Oran	0–0	CR Belouizdad	Oran
16:00		Report		Stadium: Stade Ahmed Zabana; Attendance: 0 (close doors); Referee: Redouane Necib

31 January 2015 18	RC Arbaâ	1–0	MC Oran	Larbaâ
16:00	Mokdad 75'	Report		Stadium: Stade Ismaïl Makhlouf; Referee: Said Aouina

7 February 2015 19	MC Oran	1–0	USM El Harrach	Oran
16:00	Nekkache 45+1'	Report		Stadium: Stade Ahmed Zabana; Referee: Abderrezzak Arab

14 February 2015 20	CS Constantine	0–0	MC Oran	Constantine
16:00		Report		Stadium: Stade Mohamed Hamlaoui; Referee: Mokhtar Amalou

28 February 2015 21	NA Hussein Dey	1–0	MC Oran	Algiers
16:00	Ouhadda 44'	Report		Stadium: Stade 20 Août 1955; Referee: Lahlou Benbraham

6 March 2015 22	MC Oran	0–0	USM Alger	Oran
15:00	Chérif (yellow card) 29'; Hamdadou (red card) 61'; Bellabès (yellow card) 65'	Report	(yellow card) 69' Laïfaoui; (yellow card) 89' Boudebouda	Stadium: Stade Ahmed Zabana; Referee: Farouk Mial

20 March 2015 23	MC El Eulma	0–1	MC Oran	El Eulma
17:00		Report	75' Berradja	Stadium: Stade Messaoud Zougar; Referee: Farouk Houasnia

28 March 2015 24	MC Oran	0–0	USM Bel-Abbès	Oran
16:00		Report		Stadium: Stade Ahmed Zabana; Referee: Lotfi Bekouassa

21 April 2015 25	ASO Chlef	3–0	MC Oran	Chlef
16:00	Messaoud 11'; Natèche 37' (o.g.); Tedjar 48'	Report		Stadium: Stade Mohamed Boumezrag; Referee: Mohamed Bichari

25 April 2015 26	MC Oran	1–0	JS Saoura	Oran
17:00	Berradja 9'	Report		Stadium: Stade Ahmed Zabana; Referee: Merzak Halalchi

9 May 2015 27	MO Béjaïa	0–0	MC Oran	Béjaïa
17:00		Report		Stadium: Stade de l'Unité Maghrébine; Referee: Abderrezzak Arab

16 May 2015 28	MC Oran	0–0	ASM Oran	Oran
17:00		Report		Stadium: Stade Ahmed Zabana; Referee: Mohamed Benouza

23 May 2015 29	MC Alger	1–0	MC Oran	Algiers
17:00	Gourmi 48' (pen.)	Report		Stadium: Stade Omar Hammadi; Referee: Farouk Mial

29 May 2015 30	MC Oran	2–1	ES Sétif	Oran
17:00	Bezzaz 10' (pen.); Benchaâ 29'	Report	32' (pen.) Nemdil	Stadium: Stade Ahmed Zabana; Referee: Marzouk Brahimi

== Algerian Cup ==
13 December 2014 Round of 64	AS Khroub	1–2	MC Oran	El Khroub
14:00	Bouhekkak 69'	Repport	3' Hicham Chérif; 52' Nekkache	Stadium: Stade Abed Hamdani; Referee: Merzak Halalchi

27 December 2014 Round of 32	MC Oran	3–0	USM Oran	Oran
16:00	Bezzaz 59' (pen.); Nessakh 73'; Nekkache 90+2'	Repport		Stadium: Stade Ahmed Zabana; Referee: Abderrezzak Arab

21 February 2015 Round of 16	MC Oran	0–0 (a.e.t.) (1–4 p)	MO Bejaia	Oran
14:00		Repport		Stadium: Stade Ahmed Zabana; Referee: Mehdi Abid Charef

== Squad information ==
=== Playing statistics ===
No.	Pos	Nat	Player	Total		Ligue 1		Algerian Cup	
No.	Pos	Nat	Player	Apps	Goals	Apps	Goals	Apps	Goals
Goalkeepers
1	GK	(Algeria) ALG	Abderaouf Natèche	28	0	28	0	0	0
18	GK	(Algeria) ALG	Abdellah Belarbi	5	0	2	0	3	0
Defenders
17	DF	(Algeria) ALG	Farid Bellabès	26	0	23	0	3	0
99	DF	(Algeria) ALG	Lyès Saïdi	11	0	10	0	1	0
	DF	(Algeria) ALG	Zoubir Ouasti	2	0	2	0	0	0
30	DF	(Algeria) ALG	Chemseddine Nessakh	29	1	26	0	3	1
31	DF	(Algeria) ALG	Hamza Hamdadou	24	0	22	0	2	0
22	DF	(Algeria) ALG	Chafik Bourzama	25	0	22	0	3	0
21	DF	(Algeria) ALG	Abdelmalek Merbah	33	0	30	0	3	0
41	DF	(Algeria) ALG	Adel Djadane	5	0	5	0	0	0
93	DF	(Algeria) ALG	Hassouna Benchaïb	7	0	5	0	2	0
96	DF	(Algeria) ALG	Sofiane Chlaoua	4	0	3	0	1	0
	DF	(Algeria) ALG	Abdallah Benchikh	14	0	13	0	1	0
Midfielders
10	MF	(Algeria) ALG	Yacine Bezzaz	31	3	29	2	2	1
13	MF	(Algeria) ALG	Kamel Larbi	29	2	27	2	2	0
	MF	(Algeria) ALG	Khaled Kharroubi	1	0	1	0	0	0
12	MF	(Algeria) ALG	Seddik Berradja	28	2	26	2	2	0
26	MF	(Algeria) ALG	Hamza Heriat	25	0	23	0	2	0
8	MF	(Algeria) ALG	Sofiane Ammour	18	0	16	0	2	0
19	MF	(Algeria) ALG	Walid Athmani	14	0	13	0	1	0
	MF	(Algeria) ALG	Mohamed Walid Hellal	1	0	1	0	0	0
	MF	(Cameroon) CMR	Cédric N'Doumbé	3	0	2	0	1	0
Forwards
7	FW	(Algeria) ALG	Mohamed Hicham Chérif	25	4	22	3	3	1
94	FW	(Algeria) ALG	Mounir Fekih	10	0	9	0	1	0
33	FW	(Algeria) ALG	Hichem Nekkache	28	6	25	4	3	2
	FW	(Algeria) ALG	Zakaria Benchaâ	6	1	6	1	0	0
Players transferred out during the season
86	MF	(Algeria) ALG	Bilal Bahloul	3	0	3	0	0	0
	MF	(Algeria) ALG	Abdelmadjid Benatia	4	0	4	0	0	0
	FW	(Libya) LBA	Mohamed Zubya	14	4	13	4	1	0

Last updated: 25 November 2017
Source: fr.soccerway.com

=== Goalscorers ===
Includes all competitive matches. The list is sorted alphabetically by surname when total goals are equal.

No.	Nat.	Player	Pos.	Ligue 1	Cup	TOTAL
33	(Algeria)	Hichem Nekkache	FW	4	2	6
27	(Libya)	Mohammad Za'abia	FW	4	0	4
7	(Algeria)	Mohamed Hicham Chérif	FW	3	1	4
10	(Algeria)	Yacine Bezzaz	MF	2	1	3
12	(Algeria)	Seddik Berradja	MF	2	0	2
13	(Algeria)	Kamel Larbi	FW	2	0	2
-	(Algeria)	Zakaria Benchaâ	FW	1	0	1
30	(Algeria)	Chemseddine Nessakh	DF	0	1	1
Own Goals				1	0	1
Totals				19	5	24

== Transfers ==
=== In ===
Date	Pos	Player	From club	Transfer fee	Source
1 July 2014	GK	(Algeria) Abderaouf Natèche	CS Constantine	Free transfer	
1 July 2014	DF	(Algeria) Hamza Hamdadou	CA Bordj Bou Arreridj	Free transfer	
1 July 2014	DF	(Algeria) Abdelmalek Merbah	JS Kabylie	Free transfer	
1 July 2014	MF	(Algeria) Abdelmadjid Benatia	CS Constantine	Free transfer	
19 June 2014	MF	(Algeria) Khaled Kharroubi	(Thailand) Sisaket	Free transfer	
19 June 2014	DF	(Algeria) Kamel Larbi	(France) EF Saint-Raphaël	Free transfer	
1 July 2014	MF	(Algeria) Bilal Bahloul	CS Constantine	Free transfer	
1 July 2014	MF	(Algeria) Sofiane Ammour	CA Bordj Bou Arreridj	Free transfer	
1 July 2014	FW	(Algeria) Walid Athmani	ASM Oran	Free transfer	
11 July 2014	MF	(Algeria) Yacine Bezzaz	CS Constantine	Free transfer	
12 January 2015	MF	(Cameroon) Cédric N'Doumbé	(France) Trélissac FC	Free transfer	
14 January 2015	FW	(Democratic Republic of the Congo) Jean-Marc Makusu Mundele	(Belgium) Standard Liège	Loan for six months	

=== Out ===
Date	Pos	Player	To club	Transfer fee	Source
1 July 2014	MF	(Central African Republic) Eudes Dagoulou	ES Sétif	Free transfer (Released)	
8 October 2014	MF	(Algeria) Abdelmadjid Benatia	Unattached	Free transfer (Released)	
10 November 2014	MF	(Algeria) Bilal Bahloul	Unattached	Free transfer (Released)	
