= 2013–14 MC Oran season =

MC Oran
2013–14 season
- Chairman: Youcef Djebbari
- Head coach: Omar Belatoui
- Stadium: Stade Ahmed Zabana, Oran
- Ligue 1: 12th
- Algerian Cup: Quarter-final
- Top goalscorer: League: Mohamed Benyettou (6); All: Mohamed Benyettou (6)
Home colours	Away colours

In the 2013–14 season, MC Oran competed in the Ligue 1 for the 48th season, as well as the Algerian Cup.

== Competitions ==
=== Overview ===
Competition	Record								Started round	Final position / round	First match	Last match
Competition	G	W	D	L	GF	GA	GD	Win %	Started round	Final position / round	First match	Last match
Ligue 1	30	9	8	13	33	40	−7	30.00	—N/a	13th	24 August 2013	22 May 2014
Algerian Cup	4	2	1	1	6	4	+2	50.00	Round of 64	Quarter-final	6 December 2013	18 February 2014
Total	34	11	9	14	39	44	−5	32.35				

Updated to match played 9 May 2017
Source: Competitions

== League table ==
Pos	Team	Pld	W	D	L	GF	GA	GD	Pts	Qualification or relegation
10	CS Constantine	30	10	11	9	30	31	−1	41	
11	MO Béjaïa	30	10	6	14	29	35	−6	36	
12	MC Oran	30	9	8	13	33	40	−7	35	
13	CR Belouizdad	30	9	5	16	26	33	−7	32	
14	JSM Béjaïa (R)	30	7	7	16	24	44	−20	28	Relegation to Ligue Professionnelle 2

Updated to match(es) played on 22 May 2014. Source: DZFoot
Rules for classification: 1) points; 2) head-to-head points; 3) head-to-head goal difference; 4) goal difference; 5) total goals; 6) fairplay ranking; 7) playoff.
(R) Relegated

=== Results summary ===
Overall								Home						Away					
Pld	W	D	L	GF	GA	GD	Pts	W	D	L	GF	GA	GD	W	D	L	GF	GA	GD
30	9	8	13	33	40	−7	35	8	5	2	22	11	+11	1	3	11	11	29	−18

Last updated: 29 December 2014.
Source: Competitive matches

=== Results by round ===
Round	1	2	3	4	5	6	7	8	9	10	11	12	13	14	15	16	17	18	19	20	21	22	23	24	25	26	27	28	29	30
Ground	H	A	H	A	H	A	H	A	H	A	H	A	A	H	A	A	H	A	H	A	H	A	H	A	H	A	H	H	A	H
Result	W	D	D	L	D	L	W	L	W	L	L	W	L	W	D	L	L	L	D	L	D	L	W	L	W	L	W	W	D	D
Position	4	6	7	9	11	12	10	12	10	11	12	11	12	10	11	11	11	12	12	12	13	13	12	13	13	13	11	11	11	12

Updated to match(es) played on 29 December 2014. Source: Competitive matches
A = Away; H = Home; W = Win; D = Draw; L = Loss

=== Matches ===
24 August 2013 Round 1	MC Oran	1 - 0	ASO Chlef	Oran
18:00 UTC+1	Bouaïcha 58'	Report		Stadium: Stade Ahmed Zabana; Referee: Mehdi Abid Charef

6 September 2013 Round 2	ES Sétif	1 - 1	MC Oran	Sétif
18:00 UTC+1	Gourmi 43'	Report	35' Benyettou	Stadium: Stade 8 Mai 1945; Referee: Mokhtar Amalou

3 September 2013 Round 3	MC Oran	1 - 1	MC Alger	Oran
18:00 UTC+1	Bouaïcha 63'	Report	55' (pen.) Djallit	Stadium: Stade Ahmed Zabana; Referee: Boubekeur Zouaoui

14 September 2013 Round 4	JS Kabylie	2 - 0	MC Oran	Tizi Ouzou
18:00 UTC+1	Aouedj 16'; Beziouen 90+3'	Report		Stadium: Stade 1er Novembre 1954; Referee: Said Aouina

21 September 2013 Round 5	MC Oran	0 - 0	CS Constantine	Oran
18:00 UTC+1		Report		Stadium: Stade Ahmed Zabana; Referee: Sofiane Bousseter

28 September 2013 Round 6	USM El Harrach	2 - 0	MC Oran	Algiers
16:00 UTC+1	Amada 82' (pen.); I. Sylla 89'	Report		Stadium: Stade 1er Novembre 1954; Referee: Abderrezzak Arab

5 October 2013 Round 7	MC Oran	2 - 0	MO Béjaïa	Oran
18:00 UTC+1	Nessakh 38'; Benyettou 84'	Report		Stadium: Ahmed Zabana Stadium; Referee: Rafik Achouri

19 October 2013 Round 8	JS Saoura	3 - 1	MC Oran	Béchar
15:00 UTC+1	Aoudou 23', 38'; Bagayoko 78'	Report	84' F. Amrane	Stadium: Stade 20 Août 1955; Referee: Boubekeur Zouaoui

26 October 2013 Round 9	MC Oran	3 - 2	CA Bordj Bou Arréridj	Oran
18:00 UTC+1	Naït Slimani 13', 23'; Nessakh 46'	Report	15' H. Hamdadou; 45+2' (pen.) Tiaïba	Stadium: Ahmed Zabana Stadium; Referee: Merzak Halalchi

1 November 2013 Round 10	MC El Eulma	2 - 1	MC Oran	El Eulma
16:45 UTC+1	Hamiti 42'; Derrardja 45+2'	Report	43' Mokhtari	Stadium: Stade Messaoud Zougar; Referee: Farouk Mial

9 November 2013 Round 11	MC Oran	0 - 1	USM Alger	Oran
17:45 UTC+1		Report	46' Ferhat; (yellow card) 22' Koudri; (yellow card) 68' Baïteche	Stadium: Stade Ahmed Zabana; Referee: Redouane Necib

23 November 2013 Round 12	CRB Aïn Fakroun	0 - 1	MC Oran	Aïn M'lila
15:00 UTC+1		Report	23' Bouaïcha	Stadium: Stade des Frères Demane Debbih; Attendance: 0 (close doors); Referee: Sofiane Bousseter

30 November 2013 Round 13	JSM Béjaïa	1 - 0	MC Oran	Béjaïa
18:00 UTC+1	L. Hammouche 6'	Report		Stadium: Stade de l'Unité Maghrébine; Referee: Amine Sekhraoui

14 December 2013 Round 14	MC Oran	1 - 0	CR Belouizdad	Oran
17:45 UTC+1	Chérif 58'	Report		Stadium: Ahmed Zabana Stadium; Referee: Rafik Achouri

28 December 2013 Round 15	RC Arbaâ	1 - 1	MC Oran	Blida
15:00 UTC+1	Bougueroua 49' (pen.)	Report	42' (pen.) F. Amrane	Stadium: Stade Frères Brakni; Referee: Redouane Necib

17 January 2014 Round 16	ASO Chlef	2 - 0	MC Oran	Chlef
16:00 UTC+1	Tedjar 79' (pen.); Daham 90+2'	Report		Stadium: Stade Mohamed Boumezrag; Referee: Farouk Mial

1 February 2014 Round 17	MC Oran	0 - 1	ES Sétif	Oran
15:00 UTC+1		Report	11' Nadji	Stadium: Ahmed Zabana Stadium; Referee: Amine Sekhraoui

8 February 2014 Round 18	MC Alger	2 - 0	MC Oran	Algiers
16:00 UTC+1	Hachoud 43'; Bouguèche 50'	Report		Stadium: Stade Omar Hamadi; Attendance: 0 (close doors); Referee: Abderrezzak Arab

14 February 2014 Round 19	MC Oran	0 - 0	JS Kabylie	Oran
15:00 UTC+1		Report		Stadium: Ahmed Zabana Stadium; Referee: Mehdi Abid Charef

22 February 2014 Round 20	CS Constantine	2 - 1	MC Oran	Constantine
15:00 UTC+1	Bezzaz 50' (pen.); Boulemdaïs 80'	Report	9' I. Korbiaa	Stadium: Stade Mohamed Hamlaoui; Referee: Said Aouina

1 March 2014 Round 21	MC Oran	1 - 1	USM El Harrach	Oran
15:00 UTC+1	Berradja 48'	Report	5' Younès	Stadium: Ahmed Zabana Stadium; Referee: Rafik Achouri

8 March 2014 Round 22	MO Béjaïa	1 - 0	MC Oran	Béjaïa
18:00 UTC+1	A. Bouamria 85'	Report		Stadium: Stade de l'Unité Maghrébine; Referee: Merzak Halalchi

15 March 2014 Round 23	MC Oran	4 - 1	JS Saoura	Oran
15:00 UTC+1	Dagoulou 25', 55'; M. Fekih 57', 65'	Report	63' Aoudou	Stadium: Ahmed Zabana Stadium; Referee: Farouk Houasnia

22 March 2014 Round 24	CA Bordj Bou Arréridj	3 - 1	MC Oran	Bordj Bou Arréridj
15:00 UTC+1	N. Hamimid 9'; M. Mosrati 62'; Mansour 86'	Report	14' M. Fekih	Stadium: Stade 20 Août 1955; Referee: Lahlou Benbraham

26 April 2014 Round 25	MC Oran	1 - 0	MC El Eulma	Oran
15:00 UTC+1	Nessakh 83' (pen.)	Report		Stadium: Ahmed Zabana Stadium; Referee: Mohamed Bichari

3 May 2014 Round 26	USM Alger	5 - 2	MC Oran	Algiers
18:00 UTC+1	Nsombo 7'; Meftah 31' (pen.); Ferhat (yellow card) 40' (goal) 40', 63'; Seguer 44'	Report	19', 90+1' Berradja	Stadium: Stade Omar Hamadi; Referee: Farouk Mial

10 May 2014 Round 27	MC Oran	3 - 1	CRB Aïn Fakroun	Oran
17:00 UTC+1	Bouaïcha 42'; Berradja 50'; Benyettou 87'	Report	44' (pen.) A. Daïra	Stadium: Ahmed Zabana Stadium; Referee: Mokhtar Amalou

13 May 2014 Round 28	MC Oran	3 - 1	JSM Béjaïa	Oran
17:00 UTC+1	Berradja 2'; Benyettou 60'; Dagoulou 70'	Report	50' B. Bensaha	Stadium: Ahmed Zabana Stadium; Referee: Merzak Halalchi

17 May 2014 Round 29	CR Belouizdad	2 - 2	MC Oran	Algiers
17:00 UTC+1	Bourakba 4', 65' (pen.)	Report	41' Bouaïcha; 90' O. Belatoui	Stadium: Stade 20 Août 1955; Referee: Mehdi Abid Charef

24 May 2014 Round 30	MC Oran	2 - 2	RC Arbaâ	Oran
17:00 UTC+1	Benyettou 35', 69' (pen.)	Report	5' Bougueroua; 40' M. Dramé	Stadium: Ahmed Zabana Stadium; Referee: Abderrezzak Arab

== Algerian Cup ==
20 December 2013 Round of 32	MC Oran	2 – 1 (a.e.t.)	JSM Béjaïa	Oran
17:00	Kouriba 70'; Amrane 111'	Repport	90' (pen.) Coulibaly	Stadium: Stade Ahmed Zabana; Referee: Arab, Bazine, Chenaoua

24 January 2014 Round of 16	NC Magra	1 – 1 (a.e.t.) (3 – 4 p)	MC Oran	M'Sila
15:00	Mejdoub 1'	Repport	90' Eudes Dagoulou	Stadium: Stade Ahmed-Khalfa; Referee: Hallalchi, Azrine, Badache

18 February 2014 Quarter-final	JS Kabylie	1 – 0	MC Oran	Tizi Ouzou
15:00	Madi 80'	Repport		Stadium: Stade 1er Novembre 1954; Attendance: 15.000; Referee: Zouaoui, Bitam, F. Aouina

== Squad information ==
=== Playing statistics ===
No.	Pos	Nat	Player	Total		Ligue 1		Algerian Cup	
No.	Pos	Nat	Player	Apps	Goals	Apps	Goals	Apps	Goals
Goalkeepers
1	GK	(Algeria) ALG	Hamza Dahmane	11	0	11	0	0	0
18	GK	(Algeria) ALG	Abdellah Belarbi	19	0	19	0	0	0
Defenders
4	DF	(Algeria) ALG	Farid Bellabès	24	0	24	0	0	0
95	DF	(Algeria) ALG	Mohamed Amine Aouamri	23	0	23	0	0	0
99	DF	(Algeria) ALG	Lyès Saïdi	17	0	17	0	0	0
	DF	(Algeria) ALG	Mohamed Megherbi	3	0	3	0	0	0
30	DF	(Algeria) ALG	Chemseddine Nessakh	21	0	21	0	0	0
22	DF	(Algeria) ALG	Chafik Bourzama	17	0	17	0	0	0
90	DF	(Algeria) ALG	Bouazza Krachai	1	0	1	0	0	0
	DF	(Algeria) ALG	Mokhtar Azmani	2	0	2	0	0	0
21	DF	(Algeria) ALG	Mohamed Djahel	2	0	2	0	0	0
	DF	(Algeria) ALG	Adel Djadane	6	0	6	0	0	0
	DF	(Algeria) ALG	Hassouna Benchaïb	3	0	3	0	0	0
	DF	(Algeria) ALG	Sofiane Chlaoua	5	0	5	0	0	0
	DF	(Algeria) ALG	Mohamed Azmani	1	0	1	0	0	0
Midfielders
31	MF	(Algeria) ALG	Chadli Amri	7	0	7	0	0	0
12	MF	(Algeria) ALG	Seddik Berradja	17	5	17	5	0	0
11	MF	(Algeria) ALG	Mohamed El Amine Aouad	20	0	20	0	0	0
6	MF	(Algeria) ALG	Sofiane Bouterbiat	24	0	24	0	0	0
26	MF	(Algeria) ALG	Hamza Heriat	17	0	17	0	0	0
19	MF	(Central African Republic) CAF	Eudes Dagoulou	22	3	22	3	0	0
	MF	(Algeria) ALG	Mohamed Abdelli	1	0	1	0	0	0
	MF	(Algeria) ALG	Bouazza	1	0	1	0	0	0
15	MF	(Algeria) ALG	Abdelatif Benamar	7	0	7	0	0	0
92	MF	(Algeria) ALG	Amine Naït Slimani	16	0	16	0	0	0
Forwards
25	FW	(Algeria) ALG	Farès Amrane	19	2	19	2	0	0
41	FW	(Algeria) ALG	Ilyès Kouriba	21	1	21	1	0	0
34	FW	(Algeria) ALG	Hicham Chérif	22	1	22	1	0	0
24	FW	(Algeria) ALG	Djamel Bouaïcha	19	5	19	5	0	0
38	FW	(Algeria) ALG	Hichem Mokhtari	11	1	11	1	0	0
	FW	(Algeria) ALG	Hamouda Fedel	1	0	1	0	0	0
9	FW	(Algeria) ALG	Mohamed Benyettou	28	6	28	6	0	0
	FW	(Algeria) ALG	Mounir Fekih	6	3	6	3	0	0
	FW	(Algeria) ALG	Imad Slimani	3	0	3	0	0	0
	FW	(Algeria) ALG	Omar Belatoui	2	1	2	1	0	0
	FW	(Algeria) ALG	Djerouri	1	0	1	0	0	0
Players transferred out during the season

Last updated: 9 October 2017
Source: fr.soccerway.com

== Transfers ==
=== In ===
==== Summer ====
Date	Pos	Player	From club	Transfer fee	Source
1 July 2013	GK	(Algeria) Abdellah Belarbi	ES Mostaganem	Undisclosed	
1 July 2013	DF	(Algeria) Mohamed Amine Aouamri	ASO Chlef	Free transfer	
1 July 2013	DF	(Algeria) Hassouna Benchaïb	Reserve team	First Professional Contract	
1 July 2013	DF	(Algeria) Chemseddine Nessakh	ASO Chlef	3,800,000 DA	
1 July 2013	MF	(Algeria) Mohamed Abdelli	USM Bel-Abbès	Free transfer	
1 July 2013	DF	(Algeria) Mohamed Djahel	ES Mostaganem	Free transfer	
1 July 2013	MF	(Algeria) Abdelatif Benamar	CR Temouchent	Undisclosed	
1 July 2013	FW	(Algeria) Hichem Mokhtari	USM Alger	Free transfer	
1 July 2013	FW	(Algeria) Mounir Fekih	Reserve team	First Professional Contract	
3 July 2013	FW	(Algeria) Djamel Bouaïcha	JS Kabylie	Free transfer	
25 July 2013	FW	(Algeria) Farès Amrane	MO Béjaïa	Undisclosed	
25 July 2013	MF	(Algeria) Hamza Heriat	CA Batna	Free transfer	
31 July 2013	DF	(Algeria) Lyès Saïdi	ASO Chlef	Free transfer	
19 September 2013	MF	(Algeria) Chadli Amri	Unattached	Free transfer	

==== Winter ====
Date	Pos	Player	From club	Transfer fee	Source
14 January 2014	GK	(Algeria) Abdelatif Houha	MC Saïda	Free transfer	

=== Out ===
==== Summer ====
Date	Pos	Player	To club	Transfer fee	Source
3 July 2013	DF	(Algeria) Zine El-Abidine Sebbah	CS Constantine	Undisclosed	
