= 2010–11 MC Oran season =

MC Oran
2010–11 season
- Chairman: Tayeb Mehiaoui
- Head coach: Tahar Chérif El-Ouazzani
- Stadium: Stade Ahmed Zabana
- Ligue 1: 7th
- Algerian Cup: Semi-finals
- Top goalscorer: League: Seddik Berradja (8 goals); All: Seddik Berradja (9 goals)

During the 2010–11 season, MC Oran competed in the 45th season of the Algerian Ligue 1, as well as the Algerian Cup.

== Squad list ==
Players and squad numbers last updated on 18 November 2010.
Note: Flags indicate national team as has been defined under FIFA eligibility rules. Players may hold more than one non-FIFA nationality.

No.	Nat.	Position	Name	Date of birth (age)	Signed from
Goalkeepers
16	(Algeria)	GK	Ahmed Fellah	14 November 1982 (aged 28)	(Algeria) CR Belouizdad
1	(Algeria)	GK	Houari El-Ghoul	19 May 1985 (aged 25)	(Algeria) Youth system
22	(Algeria)	GK	Mohamed Reda Ouamane	22 June 1983 (aged 27)	(Algeria) MC Alger
Defenders
4	(Algeria)	CB	Farid Bellabes	20 October 1985 (aged 25)	(Algeria) JS Kabylie
5	(Algeria)	CB	Zoubir Ouasti	28 February 1981 (aged 29)	(Algeria) USM Annaba
29	(Algeria)	RB	Kada Kechamli	12 January 1978 (aged 32)	(Algeria) ASO Chlef
8	(Algeria)	CB	Mohamed Amine Zidane	5 October 1983 (aged 27)	(Algeria) RC Relizane
20	(Algeria)	LB	Hachemi Boussaada	25 February 1978 (aged 32)	(Algeria) GC Mascara
13	(Algeria)	LB	Sofiane Bengoureïne	10 October 1984 (aged 26)	(Algeria) JS Kabylie
15	(Algeria)	CB	Mohamed Zine El Abidine Sebbah	22 March 1987 (aged 23)	(Algeria) Youth system
18	(Algeria)	RB	Akram Benaoumeur	24 July 1981 (aged 29)	(Algeria) USM Alger
3	(Algeria)	LB	Sid Ahmed Fayçal Briki	10 August 1984 (aged 26)	(Algeria) USM El Harrach
Midfielders
25	(Algeria)	RM	Mohamed Bentiba	21 October 1989 (aged 21)	(Algeria) Youth system
14	(Algeria)	MF	Touhami Tiah	11 February 1986 (aged 24)	(Algeria) CRB Ain el turk
23	(Algeria)	DM	Abbas Aisaoui	5 September 1986 (aged 24)	(Algeria) Youth system
7	(Algeria)	CF	Kouider Boukessassa	30 May 1974 (aged 36)	(Algeria) RCG Oran
6	(Algeria)	DM	Abdelmadjid Benatia	12 December 1984 (aged 26)	(Algeria) ASM Oran
12	(Algeria)	LC	Seddik Berradja	20 September 1983 (aged 27)	(Algeria) Youth system
24	(Algeria)	DM	Mohamed Tahar	20 February 1984 (aged 26)	(Algeria) Youth system
30	(Algeria)	AM	Sid Ahmed Aouedj	7 July 1991 (aged 19)	(Algeria) Youth system
Forwards
11	(Algeria)	FW	Chemseddine Chellali	4 November 1986 (aged 24)	(Algeria) Youth system
19	(Algeria)	CB	Karim Meddahi	16 March 1983 (aged 27)	(Algeria) Youth system
17	(Algeria)	CF	Bouabdellah Daoud	15 February 1978 (aged 32)	(Algeria) CR Témouchent
9	(Algeria)	FW	Laid Haddou	11 April 1985 (aged 25)	(Algeria) Youth system
21	(Algeria)	CF	Nasreddine El Bahari	11 April 1986 (aged 24)	(Algeria) NRB Bethioua
31	(Algeria)	LW	Youcef Belaïli	1 January 1991 (aged 20)	(Algeria) Youth system
10	(Algeria)	CF	Karim Braham Chaouch	17 July 1978 (aged 32)	(Algeria) NA Hussein Dey

== Competitions ==
=== Overview ===
Competition	Record								Started round	Final position / round	First match	Last match
Competition	G	W	D	L	GF	GA	GD	Win %	Started round	Final position / round	First match	Last match
Ligue 1	30	11	8	11	26	27	−1	36.67	—N/a	7th	25 September 2010	8 July 2011
Algerian Cup	5	3	1	1	8	4	+4	60.00	Round of 64	Semi-final	31 December 2010	18 April 2011
Total	35	14	9	12	34	31	+3	40.00				

Updated to match played 9 May 2017
Source: Competitions

== League table ==
Pos	Team	Pld	W	D	L	GF	GA	GD	Pts
5	CR Belouizdad	30	12	9	9	33	26	+7	45
6	MC Saïda	30	11	9	10	33	35	−2	42
7	MC Oran	30	11	8	11	26	27	−1	41
8	AS Khroub	30	10	9	11	30	36	−6	39
9	USM Alger	30	9	11	10	32	28	+4	38

Updated to match(es) played on 19 April 2018. Source: DZFoot
Rules for classification: 1) points; 2) head-to-head points; 3) head-to-head goal difference; 4) goal difference; 5) total goals; 6) fairplay ranking; 7) playoff.

=== Results summary ===
Overall								Home						Away					
Pld	W	D	L	GF	GA	GD	Pts	W	D	L	GF	GA	GD	W	D	L	GF	GA	GD
30	11	8	11	26	27	−1	41	9	5	1	17	8	+9	2	3	10	9	19	−10

Last updated: 29 December 2014.
Source: Competitive matches

=== Results by round ===
Round	1	2	3	4	5	6	7	8	9	10	11	12	13	14	15	16	17	18	19	20	21	22	23	24	25	26	27	28	29	30
Ground	A	H	A	H	A	A	H	A	H	A	H	A	H	A	H	H	A	H	A	H	H	A	H	A	H	A	H	A	H	A
Result	D	D	W	W	L	L	W	L	W	D	W	L	W	D	W	D	L	D	W	D	L	L	W	L	W	L	W	L	D	L
Position	9	13	8	6	8	10	7	9	7	7	5	7	6	7	3	5	4	5	5	5	7	7	6	7	6	6	6	6	6	7

Source: Competitive matches
A = Away; H = Home; W = Win; D = Draw; L = Loss

=== Matches ===
Win Draw Loss

25 September 2010 Round 1	USM Blida	0–0	MC Oran	Blida
17:00		Soccerway report		Stadium: Stade Mustapha Tchaker; Referee: Farouk Houasnia

2 November 2010 Round 2	MC Oran	0–0	JS Kabylie	Oran
14:30		Soccerway report		Stadium: Ahmed Zabana Stadium; Referee: Redouane Necib

10 October 2010 Round 3	MC Alger	0–1	MC Oran	Algiers
17:00		Soccerway report	Berradja 81' (pen.)	Stadium: Stade 5 Juillet 1962; Referee: Mehdi Abid Charef

23 October 2010 Round 4	MC Oran	1–0	AS Khroub	Oran
17:00	Boukessassa 63'	Soccerway report		Stadium: Ahmed Zabana Stadium; Referee: Mohamed Haddada

26 October 2010 Round 5	MC El Eulma	1–0	MC Oran	El Eulma
17:00	Kadri 75'	Soccerway report		Stadium: Stade Messaoud Zougar; Referee: Farid Bahloul

30 October 2010 Round 6	CR Belouizdad	2–1	MC Oran	Belouizdad
17:00	Bourakba 9', 54'	Soccerway report	Berradja 3'	Stadium: Stade 20 Août 1955; Referee: Rafik Achouri

6 November 2010 Round 7	MC Oran	1–0	CA Bordj Bou Arreridj	Oran
14:30	Aouedj 75'	Soccerway report		Stadium: Ahmed Zabana Stadium; Referee: Sofiane Bousseter

12 November 2010 Round 8	ASO Chlef	2–1	MC Oran	Chlef
15:00	Djediat 54'; Soudani 57'	Soccerway report	Berradja 78'	Stadium: Stade Mohamed Boumezrag; Referee: Mohamed Bichari

27 November 2010 Round 9	MC Oran	1–0	USM Alger	Oran
14:30	Belaïli 48'	Soccerway report		Stadium: Stade Ahmed Zabana; Referee: Mehdi Abid Charef

3 December 2010 Round 10	ES Sétif	0–0	MC Oran	Sétif
18:00		Soccerway report		Stadium: Stade 8 Mai 1945; Referee: Ali Bouali

10 December 2010 Round 11	MC Oran	1–0	USM Annaba	Oran
15:00	Aïssaoui 66'	Soccerway report		Stadium: Ahmed Zabana Stadium; Referee: Mohamed Haddada

17 December 2010 Round 12	WA Tlemcen	2–1	MC Oran	Tlemcen
14:30	Lazaref 36'; Bachiri 81'	Soccerway report	Berradja 90'	Stadium: Stade Akid Lotfi; Referee: Sofiane Bousseter

24 December 2010 Round 13	MC Oran	2–1	JSM Béjaïa	Oran
15:00	Aouedj 45'; Belaïli 84'	Soccerway report	N'Djeng 67' (pen.)	Stadium: Ahmed Zabana Stadium; Attendance: 0 (close doors); Referee: Boubekeur Zouaoui

19 February 2011 Round 14	USM El Harrach	3–3	MC Oran	Algiers
14:30	Boumechra 13' (pen.); Yachir 67'; Benabderahmane 86'	Soccerway report	Chérif 62'; Berradja 68' (pen.), 90' (pen.)	Stadium: Stade 1er Novembre 1954; Referee: Boubekeur Zouaoui

26 February 2011 Round 15	MC Oran	1–0	MC Saïda	Oran
14:30	El Hadjari 40' (o.g.)	Soccerway report		Stadium: Ahmed Zabana Stadium; Referee: Farouk Houasnia

19 March 2011 Round 16	MC Oran	1–1	USM Blida	Oran
14:30	Aouedj 33' (pen.)	Soccerway report	Rouag 54'	Stadium: Ahmed Zabana Stadium; Referee: Ali Bouali

29 March 2011 Round 17	JS Kabylie	1–0	MC Oran	Tizi Ouzou
15:30	Hamiti 51'	Soccerway report		Stadium: Stade 1er Novembre 1954; Referee: Mohamed Babou

30 April 2011 Round 18	MC Oran	1–1	MC Alger	Oran
17:00	Chérif 76'	Soccerway report	Laref 20'	Stadium: Ahmed Zabana Stadium; Referee: Farid Bahloul

13 April 2011 Round 19	AS Khroub	1–2	MC Oran	El Khroub
15:00	Maanser 72'	Soccerway report	Chérif 55', 65'	Stadium: Stade Abed Hamdani; Referee: Sofiane Bousseter

25 April 2011 Round 20	MC Oran	1–1	MC El Eulma	Oran
17:00	El Bahari 48'	Soccerway report	Tiaïba 2'	Stadium: Ahmed Zabana Stadium; Referee: Merzak Halalchi

7 May 2011 Round 21	MC Oran	1–2	CR Belouizdad	Oran
17:00	Aouadj 85'	Soccerway report	Slimani 3'; Kherbache 45'	Stadium: Ahmed Zabana Stadium; Referee: Boubekeur Zouaoui

13 May 2011 Round 22	CA Bordj Bou Arreridj	1–0	MC Oran	Bordj Bou Arréridj
20:00	Belkheïr 18'	Soccerway report		Stadium: Stade 20 Août 1955; Referee: Farouk Houasnia

21 May 2011 Round 23	MC Oran	1–0	ASO Chlef	Oran
17:00	Berradja 44' (pen.)	Soccerway report		Stadium: Ahmed Zabana Stadium; Referee: Mehdi Abid Charef

27 May 2011 Round 24	USM Alger	2–0	MC Oran	Bologhine
19:00	Ouznadji 33'; Aouamri 44'	Soccerway report		Stadium: Omar Hamadi Stadium; Referee: Rafik Achouri

31 May 2011 Round 25	MC Oran	1–0	ES Sétif	Oran
17:00	Aïssaoui 38'	Soccerway report		Stadium: Ahmed Zabana Stadium; Referee: Mokhtar Amalou

11 June 2011 Round 26	USM Annaba	2–0	MC Oran	Annaba
18:00	Naâmoune 9'; Herbache 48' (pen.)	Soccerway report		Stadium: Stade 19 Mai 1956; Referee: Sofiane Bousseter

25 June 2011 Round 27	MC Oran	2–0	WA Tlemcen	Oran
18:00	Belaïli 50'; Berradja 79'	Soccerway report		Stadium: Ahmed Zabana Stadium; Referee: Farouk Mial

28 June 2011 Round 28	JSM Béjaïa	1–0	MC Oran	Béjaïa
18:00	Gasmi 54'	Soccerway report		Stadium: Stade de l'Unité Maghrébine; Referee: Merzak Halalchi

1 July 2011 Round 29	MC Oran	2–2	USM El Harrach	Oran
18:00	Belaïli 8'; Kechamli 90+1'	Soccerway report	Boualem 4', 24' (pen.)	Stadium: Ahmed Zabana Stadium; Referee: Farid Bahloul

8 July 2011 Round 30	MC Saïda	1–0	MC Oran	Saida
18:00	Zaoui 85'	Soccerway report		Stadium: April 13, 1958 Stadium; Referee: Youssef Zerrouki

== Algerian Cup ==
31 December 2010 Round of 64	CS Constantine	1–3	MC Oran	Constantine
14:30	Boumediène 45'	Report	Belaïli 10'; Berradja 15', 62'	Stadium: Stade Mohamed Hamlaoui
Note: Lineup for MC Oran - Fellah - Sebbah, Zidane, Ouasti, Boussaâda - Aïssaoui, Tahar, Berradja, Aouedj (Briki 68') - Belaïli (Bentiba 90'), B. Daoud (Belabbes 77').

4 March 2011 Round of 32	ASM Oran	0–1	MC Oran	Oran
15:00		Report	Belaïli 20'	Stadium: Ahmed Zabana Stadium
Note: Lineup for MC Oran - Fellah - Sebbah, Belabbès, Ouasti, Bouassaâda - Aïssaoui (Zidane, 87’), Tahar, Berradja (Bentiba, 77’), Aouedj - Belaïli, Daoud (Meddahi, 58’)

15 March 2011 Round of 16	USM Aïn Beïda	1–3 (a.e.t.)	MC Oran	Aïn Beïda
14:30	Emcehn 90+1'	Report	Belaïli 89', 95'; Aouedj 115'	Stadium: Stade du 24 avril
Note: Lineup for MC Oran - Fellah - Sebbah, Belabbès, Ouasti, Boussaâda - Cherif (El Bahari, 82’), Tahar, Briki (Aouedj, 104’) - Meddahi (Zidane, 101’) Belaïli, Berradja.

8 April 2011 Quarter-finals	MC Alger	0–0 (a.e.t.) (4–5 p)	MC Oran	Rouïba
17:00		Report		Stadium: Stade Mabrouki Salem; Referee: Farouk Mial
Note: Lineup for MC Oran - Fellah - Sebbah, Belabbès, Ouasti, Boussaâda – Bentiba, Benatia (Meddahi 55’), Berradja - Aïssaoui (Boukessassa 75’) - Belaili, B. Daoud.

18 April 2011 Semi-finals	JS Kabylie	2–1	MC Oran	Tizi Ouzou
18:00	Khelili 8'; Hamiti 83'	Report	Berradja 22'	Stadium: Stade 1er Novembre 1954; Referee: Mohamed Bichari
Note: Lineup for MC Oran - Fellah - Benaoumeur, Belabbès, Ouasti, Boussaâda - Aïssaoui (Boukessassa 64’), Benatia, Berradja (Zidane 88’), Aouedj - Cherif, B. Daoud (Meddahi 75’).

== Squad information ==
=== Playing statistics ===
No.	Pos	Nat	Player	Total		Ligue 1		Algerian Cup	
No.	Pos	Nat	Player	Apps	Goals	Apps	Goals	Apps	Goals
Goalkeepers
16	GK	(Algeria) ALG	Ahmed Fellah	17	0	17	0	0	0
22	GK	(Algeria) ALG	Mohamed Reda Ouamane	4	0	4	0	0	0
1	GK	(Algeria) ALG	Houari El Ghoul	12	0	12	0	0	0
Defenders
8	DF	(Algeria) ALG	Mohamed Amine Zidane	11	0	11	0	0	0
18	DF	(Algeria) ALG	Akram Benaoumeur	11	0	11	0	0	0
4	DF	(Algeria) ALG	Farid Bellabès	18	0	18	0	0	0
3	DF	(Algeria) ALG	Sid Ahmed Fayçal Briki	4	0	4	0	0	0
29	DF	(Algeria) ALG	Kada Kechamli	25	1	25	1	0	0
13	DF	(Algeria) ALG	Sofiane Bengoureïne	18	0	18	0	0	0
20	DF	(Algeria) ALG	Hachemi Boussaada	17	0	17	0	0	0
5	DF	(Algeria) ALG	Zoubir Ouasti	17	0	17	0	0	0
15	DF	(Algeria) ALG	Mohamed Zine El Abidine Sebbah	17	0	17	0	0	0
	DF	(Algeria) ALG	Abdenour Douiba	1	0	1	0	0	0
Midfielders
12	MF	(Algeria) ALG	Seddik Berradja	24	8	24	8	0	0
24	MF	(Algeria) ALG	Mohamed Tahar	12	0	12	0	0	0
23	MF	(Algeria) ALG	Abbas Aïssaoui	23	2	23	2	0	0
7	MF	(Algeria) ALG	Kouider Boukessassa	17	1	17	1	0	0
19	MF	(Algeria) ALG	Karim Meddahi	21	0	21	0	0	0
6	MF	(Algeria) ALG	Abdelmadjid Benatia	17	0	17	0	0	0
23	MF	(Algeria) ALG	Mohamed Bentiba	13	0	13	0	0	0
14	MF	(Algeria) ALG	Touhami Tiah	2	0	2	0	0	0
	MF	(Algeria) ALG	Ilyes Kadri	5	0	5	0	0	0
	MF	(Algeria) ALG	Zakaria Sahnoun	6	0	6	0	0	0
Forwards
17	FW	(Algeria) ALG	Bouabdellah Daoud	16	0	16	0	0	0
11	FW	(Algeria) ALG	Chems Eddine Chellali	3	0	3	0	0	0
19	FW	(Algeria) ALG	Karim Braham Chaouch	3	0	3	0	0	0
21	FW	(Algeria) ALG	Nasereddine El Bahari	9	1	9	1	0	0
	FW	(Algeria) ALG	Hamza Medjahed	4	0	4	0	0	0
	FW	(Algeria) ALG	Hicham Chérif	16	4	16	4	0	0
30	FW	(Algeria) ALG	Sid Ahmed Aouedj	22	4	22	4	0	0
9	FW	(Algeria) ALG	Laid Haddou	4	0	4	0	0	0
31	FW	(Algeria) ALG	Youcef Belaïli	18	4	18	4	0	0
	FW	(Algeria) ALG	Abdelkader Harir	1	0	1	0	0	0
Players transferred out during the season

Last updated: 25 November 2017
Source: fr.soccerway.com

== Transfers ==
=== In ===
Date	Pos	Player	From club	Transfer fee	Source
8 June 2010	DF	(Algeria) Mohamed Amine Zidane	USM Alger	Free transfer	
1 July 2010	DF	(Algeria) Farid Bellabès	JS Kabylie	Free transfer	
1 July 2010	DF	(Algeria) Sid Ahmed Fayçal Briki	USM El Harrach	Free transfer	
1 July 2010	DF	(Algeria) Akram Benaoumeur	USM Alger	Free transfer	
1 July 2010	MF	(Algeria) Abbas Aïssaoui	USM El Harrach	Free transfer	
1 July 2010	MF	(Algeria) Mohamed Tahar	ASM Oran	Free transfer	
1 July 2010	MF	(Algeria) Seddik Berradja	CR Belouizdad	Free transfer	
1 July 2010	FW	(Algeria) Chems Eddine Chellali	SA Mohammadia	Free transfer	
1 July 2010	FW	(Algeria) Youcef Belaïli	CA Bordj Bou Arreridj	Free transfer	
1 July 2010	FW	(Algeria) Kouider Boukessassa	JSM Béjaïa	Free transfer	
1 July 2010	FW	(Algeria) Karim Braham Chaouch	NA Hussein Dey	Free transfer	
1 January 2011	MF	(Algeria) Hamza Medjahed	MC El Eulma	Free transfer	
