= 2016–17 MC Oran season =

MC Oran
2016–17 season
- Chairman: Ahmed "Baba" Belhadj
- Head coach: Omar Belatoui (from 24 June 2016) (until 30 April 2017); Jean-Michel Cavalli (from 1 May 2017) (until 20 May 2017); Bachir Mecheri (from 20 May 2017)
- Stadium: Stade Ahmed Zabana
- Ligue 1: 7th
- Algerian Cup: Round of 32
- Top goalscorer: League: Hicham Chérif (7); All: Hicham Chérif (7); Mohamed Bentiba (7)

In the 2016–17 season, MC Oran competed in the Ligue 1 for the 51st season, as well as the Algerian Cup.

== Pre-season ==
22 July 2016 Friendly match	MC Oran	2 – 1	GC Mascara	Oran
16:30 CET (UTC+1)	Bencherif 5' (o.g.); Haddadi 71'	Report	61' Hachem	Stadium: Stade Ahmed Zabana; Attendance: 5.000

28 July 2016 Friendly match	MC Oran	1 – 1	CA Batna	Sétif
17:30 CET (UTC+1)	Moussi 23'	Report	44' Laribi	Stadium: Complexe omnisports el bez

31 July 2016 Friendly match	MC Oran	2 – 0	JSM Béjaïa	Sétif
17:30 CET (UTC+1)	Cherif 30'; Souibaâh 85'	Report		Stadium: Complexe omnisports el bez

4 August 2016 Friendly match	MC Oran	1 – 1	MC El Eulma	Sétif
17:30 CET (UTC+1)	Boudoumi 45'	Report		Stadium: Complexe omnisports el bez

7 August 2016 Friendly match	MC Oran	2 – 0	NC Magra	Sétif
16:00 CET (UTC+1)	Bentiba 69'; Cherif 85'	Report		Stadium: Complexe omnisports el bez

== Competitions ==
=== Overview ===
Competition	Record								Started round	Final position / round	First match	Last match
Competition	G	W	D	L	GF	GA	GD	Win %	Started round	Final position / round	First match	Last match
Ligue 1	30	9	13	8	24	25	−1	30.00	—N/a	7th	20 August 2016	14 June 2017
Algerian Cup	2	1	0	1	3	2	+1	50.00	Round of 64	Round of 32	24 November 2016	16 December 2016
Total	32	10	13	9	27	27	+0	31.25				

== League table ==
Pos	Team	Pld	W	D	L	GF	GA	GD	Pts	Qualification or relegation
5	JS Saoura	30	12	9	9	34	30	+4	45	
6	CR Belouizdad	30	12	7	11	30	25	+5	43	Qualification for the 2018 CAF Confederation Cup
7	MC Oran	30	9	13	8	24	25	−1	40 (Note: MC Oran ahead of NA Hussein Dey on head-to-head record: MCO–NAH 1–0, NAH–MCO 1–0 however goal difference in the first leg MCO (+7) NAH (+2).)	
8	NA Hussein Dey	30	11	7	12	38	37	+1	40	Qualification for 2017 Arab Club Championship
9	CS Constantine	30	10	9	11	34	33	+1	39 (Note: DRB Tadjenanet ahead of CS Constantine on head-to-head record: CSC–DRB 4–2, DRB–CSC 1–0.)	

Updated to match(es) played on 14 June 2017. Source: DZFoot
Rules for classification: 1) points; 2) head-to-head points; 3) head-to-head goal difference; 4) goal difference; 5) total goals; 6) fairplay ranking; 7) playoff.

=== Results summary ===
Overall								Home						Away					
Pld	W	D	L	GF	GA	GD	Pts	W	D	L	GF	GA	GD	W	D	L	GF	GA	GD
30	9	13	8	24	25	−1	40	8	6	1	17	10	+7	1	7	7	7	15	−8

Last updated: 30 January 2016.
Source: Competitive matches

=== Results by round ===
Round	1	2	3	4	5	6	7	8	9	10	11	12	13	14	15	16	17	18	19	20	21	22	23	24	25	26	27	28	29	30
Ground	A	H	A	H	A	H	A	H	A	A	H	A	H	A	H	H	A	H	A	H	A	H	A	H	H	A	H	A	H	A
Result	D	W	W	W	L	W	D	W	D	D	D	D	W	D	W	L	L	D	L	D	D	D	L	D	W	L	W	L	D	L
Position	7	4	3	2	2	2	2	2	3	4	3	3	2	3	2	3	3	4	5	6	6	7	8	9	8	8	7	8	7	7

Updated to match(es) played on 30 January 2016. Source: Competitive matches
A = Away; H = Home; W = Win; D = Draw; L = Loss

=== Matches ===
Win Draw Loss

20 August 2016 Round 1	CR Belouizdad	1 – 1	MC Oran	Belouizdad
19:00	Rebih 4'	Soccerway report Live TV: None	32' Nessakh	Stadium: Stade 20 Août 1955; Referee: Redouane Necib

27 August 2016 Round 2	MC Oran	2 – 1	Olympique de Médéa	Oran
17:45	Chérif 36'; Ferahi 55'	Report; Live TV: Algérie 3 / Canal Algérie	49' Rachedi	Stadium: Stade Ahmed Zabana; Referee: Rafik Achouri

10 September 2016 Round 3	RC Relizane	0 – 1	MC Oran	Relizane
17:00		Report; Live TV: beIN Sports / Canal Algérie	83' Nessakh	Stadium: Stade Tahar Zoughari; Referee: Lotfi Bekouassa

16 September 2016 Round 4	MC Oran	1 – 0	USM Bel-Abbès	Oran
17:45	Chérif 66'	Report; Live TV: EPTV Terrestre / Canal Algérie		Stadium: Stade Ahmed Zabana; Referee: Abderrezzak Arab

23 September 2016 Round 5	MC Alger	1 – 0	MC Oran	Bologhine
19:00	Seguer 82'	Report; Live TV: None		Stadium: Stade Omar Hamadi; Attendance: 0 (close doors); Referee: Rafik Achouri

30 September 2016 Round 6	MC Oran	1 – 0	USM El Harrach	Oran
16:00	Souibaah 6'	Report; Live TV: Algérie 3		Stadium: Stade Ahmed Zabana; Referee: Mehdi Abid Charef

14 October 2016 Round 7	CA Batna	2 – 2	MC Oran	Batna
15:00	Aribi 20'; Griche 32'	Report; Live TV: None	28' Chérif; 88' Bencheikh	Stadium: Stade Seffouhi; Referee: Farouk Mial

21 October 2016 Round 8	MC Oran	1 – 0	NA Hussein Dey	Oran
16:00	Bentiba 34'	Report; Live TV: Canal Algérie / EPTV Terrestre		Stadium: Stade Ahmed Zabana; Referee: Said Aouina

29 October 2016 Round 9	JS Kabylie	1 – 1	MC Oran	Tizi Ouzou
17:00	Ferhani 90'	Report; Live TV: None	23' Souibaah	Stadium: Stade 1er Novembre 1954; Referee: Rafik Achouri

3 November 2016 Round 10	ES Sétif	0 – 0	MC Oran	Sétif
17:00		Report; Live TV: TV Tamazight 4 / Canal Algérie		Stadium: Stade 8 Mai 1945; Referee: Lahlou Benbraham

11 November 2016 Round 11	MC Oran	0 – 0	USM Alger	Oran
16:00		Report; Live TV: TV Tamazight 4 / Algérie 3		Stadium: Habib Bouakeul Stadium; Referee: Abderrezzak Arab

18 November 2016 Round 12	MO Béjaïa	0 – 0	MC Oran	Béjaïa
16:00		Report; Live TV: EPTV Terrestre / TV Tamazight 4		Stadium: Stade de l'Unité Maghrébine; Referee: Lotfi Bekouassa

3 December 2016 Round 13	MC Oran	3 – 1	JS Saoura	Oran
16:00	Bentiba 58'; Chérif 70'; Souibaâh 74'	Report; Live TV: None	10' Bourdim	Stadium: Ahmed Zabana Stadium; Referee: Hamza Bouslimani

10 December 2016 Round 14	DRB Tadjenanet	1 – 1	MC Oran	Tadjenanet
15:00	Chibane 24' (pen.)	Report; Live TV: None	43' Souibaâh	Stadium: Lahoua Smaïl Stadium; Referee: Merzak Halalchi

23 December 2016 Round 15	MC Oran	2 – 1	CS Constantine	Oran
16:00	Bentiba 30' (pen.); Souibaâh 35'	Report; Live TV: EPTV Terrestre / Canal Algérie	11' Bezzaz	Stadium: Ahmed Zabana Stadium; Referee: Amine Hansal

14 February 2017 Round 16	MC Oran	0 – 2	CR Belouizdad	Oran
16:00; Match rescheduled due to share some of their players in the African Cup and World Cup military		Report; Live TV: Canal Algérie	13', 79' Hamia	Stadium: Ahmed Zabana Stadium; Referee: Farouk Mial

27 January 2017 Round 17	Olympique de Médéa	1 – 0	MC Oran	Médéa
15:00	Sbia 77'	Report; Live TV: TV Tamazight 4 / Canal Algérie		Stadium: Stade Imam Lyes de Médéa; Referee: Abderrezzak Arab

4 February 2017 Round 18	MC Oran	2 – 2	RC Relizane	Oran
16:00	Benayad 68' (o.g.); Chérif 79'	Report; Live TV: Algérie 3 / Canal Algérie	28' Benayad; 45+2' Guebli	Stadium: Ahmed Zabana Stadium; Referee: Lotfi Bekouassa

9 February 2017 Round 19	USM Bel-Abbès	2 – 0	MC Oran	Sidi Bel Abbès
16:00	Zouari 45'; Balegh 58'	Report; Live TV: None		Stadium: Stade 24 Fevrier 1956; Referee: Merzak Halalchi

21 April 2017 Round 20	MC Oran	0 – 0	MC Alger	Oran
17:00; Match rescheduled due to MC Alger competing in the 2017 CAF Confederation Cup		Report; Live TV: TV Tamazight 4		Stadium: Ahmed Zabana Stadium; Referee: Lahlou Benbraham

23 February 2017 Round 21	USM El Harrach	0 – 0	MC Oran	El Harrach
15:00		Report; Live TV: None		Stadium: November 1, 1954 Stadium; Referee: Amine Hansal

3 March 2017 Round 22	MC Oran	0 – 0	CA Batna	Oran
16:00		Report; Live TV: Canal Algérie / EPTV Terrestre		Stadium: Ahmed Zabana Stadium; Referee: Lahlou Benbraham

11 March 2017 Round 23	NA Hussein Dey	1 – 0	MC Oran	Mohamed Belouizdad
15:00	Bendebka 26' (pen.)	Report; Live TV: Canal Algérie		Stadium: August 20, 1955 Stadium; Referee: Amine Hansal

29 April 2017 Round 24	MC Oran	0 – 0	JS Kabylie	Oran
17:00		Report; Live TV: None		Stadium: Ahmed Zabana Stadium; Attendance: 0 (close doors); Referee: Lotfi Bekouassa

6 May 2017 Round 25	MC Oran	1 – 0	ES Sétif	Oran
16:00	Chérif 77'	Report; Live TV: None		Stadium: Ahmed Zabana Stadium; Attendance: 0 (close doors); Referee: Hamza Bouslimani

16 May 2017 Round 26	USM Alger	2 – 1	MC Oran	Bologhine
17:45	Andria 48'; Meziane 88'	Report; Live TV: Algérie 3 / TV Tamazight 4	90+3' Hamidi	Stadium: Omar Hamadi Stadium; Referee: Farouk Mial

20 May 2017 Round 27	MC Oran	2 – 1	MO Béjaïa	Oran
16:00	Chérif 11'; Bentiba 32'	Report; Live TV: None	60' Athmani	Stadium: Ahmed Zabana Stadium; Referee: Merzak Halalchi

7 June 2017 Round 28	JS Saoura	2 – 0	MC Oran	Béchar
22:30	Hammia 55'; Saâd 89'	Report; Live TV: None		Stadium: August 20, 1955 Stadium; Referee: Merzoug Brahimi

10 June 2017 Round 29	MC Oran	2 – 2	DRB Tadjenanet	Oran
17:00	Souibaâh 8'; Bentiba 29'	Report; Live TV: None	55' Noubli; 62' Aib	Stadium: Ahmed Zabana Stadium; Referee: Hamza Bouslimani

14 June 2017 Round 30	CS Constantine	1 – 0	MC Oran	Constantine
17:00	Rebih 3'	Report; Live TV: None		Stadium: Ramadan Ben-Abdelmalek Stadium; Referee: Boubekeur Zouaoui

== Algerian Cup ==
24 November 2016 Round of 64	MC Oran	2–0	MC El Eulma	Oran
14:45	Bentiba 43', 81' (pen.)	Report; Live TV: None		Stadium: Stade Ahmed Zabana; Attendance: 0 (close doors); Referee: Bekkouassa, Rimouch, Asclou

16 December 2016 Round of 32	ASO Chlef	2–1	MC Oran	Chlef
16:00	Boutiba 78'; Meddahi 87'	Report; Live TV: TV Tamazight 4 / Algérie 3	Delhoum 9'	Stadium: Mohamed Boumezrag Stadium; Referee: Bekouassa, Hamlaoui, Benoua

== Squad information ==
=== Playing statistics ===
No.	Pos	Nat	Player	Total		Ligue 1		Algerian Cup	
No.	Pos	Nat	Player	Apps	Goals	Apps	Goals	Apps	Goals
Goalkeepers
1	GK	(Algeria) ALG	Abderaouf Natèche	31	0	30	0	1	0
30	GK	(Algeria) ALG	Abdellah Belarbi	1	0	0	0	1	0
Defenders
27	DF	(Algeria) ALG	Amir Aguid	10	0	10	0	0	0
17	DF	(Algeria) ALG	Farid Bellabès	22	0	20	0	2	0
49	DF	(Algeria) ALG	Abderrahmane Belaha	9	0	9	0	0	0
42	DF	(Algeria) ALG	Réda Halaïmia	19	0	19	0	0	0
3	DF	(Algeria) ALG	Chemseddine Nessakh	28	2	27	2	1	0
15	DF	(Algeria) ALG	Zine El-Abidine Sebbah	19	0	17	0	2	0
Midfielders
10	MF	(Algeria) ALG	Mohamed El Amine Aouad	21	0	20	0	1	0
14	MF	(Algeria) ALG	Abdelhafid Benamara	13	0	12	0	1	0
11	MF	(Algeria) ALG	Abdellah Bencheikh	18	1	17	1	1	0
8	MF	(Algeria) ALG	Mohamed Bentiba	28	7	26	5	2	2
21	MF	(Algeria) ALG	Omar Boudoumi	27	0	25	0	2	0
5	MF	(Algeria) ALG	Mourad Delhoum	24	1	23	0	1	1
25	MF	(Algeria) ALG	Rachid Ferrahi	29	1	27	1	2	0
24	MF	(Algeria) ALG	Hamza Heriat	25	0	23	0	2	0
Forwards
	FW	(Algeria) ALG	Abderrazek Belal	1	0	1	0	0	0
19	FW	(Algeria) ALG	Mohamed Bennaï	15	0	15	0	0	0
23	FW	(Algeria) ALG	Hicham Chérif	29	7	27	7	2	0
	FW	(Algeria) ALG	Boumediene Freifer	3	0	3	0	0	0
	FW	(Algeria) ALG	Noureddine Gaïd	1	0	1	0	0	0
	FW	(Algeria) ALG	Walid Hamidi	4	0	4	0	0	0
	FW	(Algeria) ALG	Nordine Mouloud Hassani	5	0	4	0	1	0
7	FW	(Algeria) ALG	Abdeslam Moussi	10	0	10	0	0	0
9	FW	(Algeria) ALG	Mohamed Souibaâh	26	6	24	6	2	0
27	FW	(Algeria) ALG	Kamel Zeghli	1	0	1	0	0	0
Players transferred out during the season
	DF	(Algeria) ALG	Salim Benali	7	0	5	0	2	0
	MF	(Algeria) ALG	Tayeb Berramla	7	0	6	0	1	0

Source: Competitions

=== Goalscorers ===
Includes all competitive matches. The list is sorted alphabetically by surname when total goals are equal.

No.	Nat.	Player	Pos.	Ligue 1	Cup	TOTAL
23	(Algeria)	Hicham Chérif	FW	6	0	6
9	(Libya)	Mohamed Souibaâh	FW	6	0	6
8	(Algeria)	Mohamed Bentiba	MF	4	2	6
3	(Algeria)	Chemseddine Nessakh	DF	2	0	2
11	(Algeria)	Abdellah Bencheikh	MF	1	0	1
25	(Algeria)	Rachid Ferrahi	MF	1	0	1
-	(Algeria)	Walid Hamidi	FW	1	0	1
5	(Algeria)	Mourad Delhoum	DF	0	1	1
Own Goals				0	0	0
Totals				19	3	22

== Squad list ==
As of January 15, 2017.

Note: Flags indicate national team as defined under FIFA eligibility rules; some limited exceptions apply. Players may hold more than one non-FIFA nationality.

No.	Pos.	Nation	Player
1	GK	ALG	Abderaouf Natèche (captain)
3	DF	ALG	Chemseddine Nessakh
5	DF	ALG	Mourad Delhoum
7	FW	ALG	Abdeslam Moussi
8	MF	ALG	Mohamed Bentiba
9	FW	ALG	Mohamed Souibaâh
10	MF	ALG	Mohamed El Amine Aouad
11	MF	ALG	Abdellah Bencheikh
14	MF	ALG	Abdelhafid Benamara
15	DF	ALG	Zine El-Abidine Sebbah
16	GK	ALG	Hichem Makhloufi

No.	Pos.	Nation	Player
17	DF	ALG	Farid Bellabès
19	FW	ALG	Mohamed Bennaï
20	DF	ALG	Amir Aguid
21	MF	ALG	Omar Boudoumi
23	FW	ALG	Hicham Chérif
24	MF	ALG	Hamza Heriat
25	MF	ALG	Rachid Ferrahi
27	DF	ALG	Kamel Zeghli
30	GK	ALG	Abdellah Belarbi
42	DF	ALG	Réda Halaïmia

== Transfers ==
=== In ===
No.	Pos.	Nation	Player
20	DF	ALG	Amir Aguid (from (Algeria) MO Béjaïa)
25	DF	ALG	Salim Benali (from (Algeria) MO Béjaïa)
6	DF	ALG	Adel Gafaiti (from (England) Norwich City)
15	DF	ALG	Zine El Abidine Sebbah (from (Algeria) ASM Oran)
10	MF	ALG	Mohamed El Amine Aouad (from (Algeria) ASM Oran)
8	MF	ALG	Mohamed Bentiba (from (Algeria) ASM Oran)

No.	Pos.	Nation	Player
21	MF	ALG	Omar Boudoumi (from (Algeria) ASM Oran)
5	MF	ALG	Mourad Delhoum (from (Algeria) ES Sétif)
25	MF	ALG	Rachid Ferrahi (from (Algeria) JS Kabylie)
24	MF	ALG	Hamza Heriat (from (Algeria) USM Blida)
23	FW	ALG	Hicham Chérif (from (Algeria) USM Blida)
9	FW	ALG	Mohamed Souibaâh (from (Algeria) Paradou AC)

=== Out ===
No.	Pos.	Nation	Player
—	DF	ALG	Rabah Aïch (to (Algeria) CR Belouizdad)
—	DF	ALG	Hassouna Benchaïb (Unattached)
—	DF	ALG	Mohamed Benyahia (to (Algeria) USM Alger)
—	DF	ALG	Nabil Yaâlaoui (to (Algeria) CA Bordj Bou Arreridj)
—	MF	ALG	Sofiane Chlaoua (to (Algeria) ASM Oran)
—	MF	ALG	Hacène El Okbi (to (Egypt) Al Ittihad Alexandria)
—	MF	ALG	Walid Hellal (to (Algeria) RC Relizane)
—	MF	ALG	Khaled Lemmouchia (retired)

No.	Pos.	Nation	Player
—	FW	ALG	Merouane Dahar (to (Algeria) USM El Harrach)
—	DF	ALG	Chafik Bourzama (to (Algeria) Unattached)
—	DF	ALG	Hamza Hamdadou (to (Algeria) MC El Eulma)
—	DF	ALG	Abdelmalek Merbah (to (Algeria) JSM Béjaïa)
—	MF	ALG	Seddik Berradja (to (Algeria) ASM Oran)
—	MF	ALG	Kamel Larbi (Unattached)
—	FW	ALG	Walid Athmani (to (Algeria) USM El Harrach)
—	FW	LBA	Mohamed Zubya (to (Tunisia) ES Tunis)
—	DF	ALG	Salim Benali (to (Algeria) MO Béjaïa)
