= Bentaleb =

Bentaleb is a surname. Notable people with the surname include:

- Hadia Bentaleb (born 1980), Algerian fencer
- Lakhdar Bentaleb (born 1988), Algerian footballer
- Nabil Bentaleb (born 1994), Algerian footballer
