= Doumbe =

Doumbe, Doumbé or N'Doumbé is the surname of the following people

- Cédric Doumbé (born 1992), Cameroonian-French kickboxer
- Cédric N'Doumbé (born 1990), Cameroonian football player
- François N'Doumbé (born 1954), Cameroonian football player
- Jean-Joël Perrier-Doumbé (born 1978), French-born Cameroonian football player
- Mathias Kouo-Doumbé (born 1979), French football player

== See also ==
- Doumbé F.C., a Togolese football club
