= Moussi =

Moussi is a surname. Notable people with the surname include:

- Abdeslam Moussi (born 1990), Algerian footballer
- Abir Moussi (born 1975), Tunisian lawyer and politician
- Alain Moussi (born 1981), Gabonese-Canadian actor, stuntman, and martial artist
- Guy Moussi (born 1985), French footballer
