= Alain Ketchemen =

Cameroonian footballer

Personal information
- Full name: Alain Gérard Ketchemen
- Date of birth: July 15, 1985 (age 41)
- Place of birth: Douala, Cameroon
- Height: 1.80 m (5 ft 11 in)
- Position: Striker

Youth career
- 1999–2002: Brasseries of Cameroon

Senior career*
| Years | Team | Apps | (Gls) |
| 2002–2003 | Douala AC | | |
| 2003–2004 | Dynamo FC de Douala | | |
| 2004–2005 | MA Tétouan | | |
| 2005–2006 | Dynamo FC de Douala | | |
| 2006–2007 | JSM Béjaïa | 2 | (0) |
| 2007–2008 | CR Belouizdad | 3 | (0) |
| 2008 | CD Olivais e Moscavide | | |
| 2008–2009 | MC Oran | 1 | (0) |
| 2009– | Olympique du Littoral de Douala | | |
- * Club domestic league appearances and goals

Alain Gérard Ketchemen (born July 15, 1985) is a Cameroonian football player.

== Career ==
Ketchemen started his football career with Athletic Club Douala a Cameroonian football D2 Club after obtaining training from Formation centre of Brasseries of Cameroon. He played for few other Cameroonian football clubs before crossing over to North Africa, where he played in Morocco for Moghreb Athletic Tétouan and in Algeria with JSM Béjaïa, CR Belouizdad and MC Oran respectively. In 2008, Ketchenman went to Clube Desportivo dos Olivais e Moscavide, where he played for six months.
