= Lakhdar Bentaleb =

Algerian footballer (born 1988)

Personal information
- Full name: Mohamed Lakhdar Bentaleb
- Date of birth: October 8, 1988 (age 38)
- Place of birth: Oran, Algeria
- Position: Midfielder

Team information
- Current team: ASM Oran
- Number: 19

Senior career*
Years	Team	Apps	(Gls)
2010–2011	ASM Oran		
2011–2012	ES Sétif	3	(0)
2012–2014	MC Oran	14	(0)
2014–2017	A Bou Saâda		
2017–2018	MC El Eulma		
2018–2019	ES Mostaganem		
2019–	IRB El Kerma		

International career
2011	Algeria Military	5	(1)
- * Club domestic league appearances and goals as of 22:00, 1 October 2012 (UTC)

Mohamed Lakhdar Bentaleb (born October 8, 1988, in Oran) is an Algerian football player who lately played for IRB El Kerma. He has also 17 appearances in the Algerian top tier with ES Sétif and MC Oran.

== Club career ==
Bentaleb signed with MC Oran in the summer of 2012, joining them on a free transfer from ES Sétif.

== International career ==
In July 2011, Bentaleb was selected as part of Algeria's squad for the 2011 Military World Games in Rio de Janeiro, Brazil. He scored one goal during the competition, in the first round against Uruguay; in the end the Algerian team won its first World Military Cup.

== Honours ==
- He won the World Military Cup once with the Algeria military national football team in 2011
