= Saidou Sandaogo =

Burkinabé footballer

Personal information
- Date of birth: January 12, 1988 (age 38)
- Place of birth: Ouagadougou, Burkina Faso
- Height: 1.80 m (5 ft 11 in)
- Position: Striker

Youth career
- EF Ouagadougou

Senior career*
Years	Team	Apps	(Gls)
2009–2010	EF Ouagadougou	45	(29)
2010–2011	Haras El-Hodood SC	23	(11)
2011–2013	MC Oran	27	(14)
2013–2014	Al-Mina'a SC	23	(9)
- * Club domestic league appearances and goals as of 14:00, 19 March 2014 (UTC)

Saidou Sandaogo is a Burkinabé professional football player. He has last played for Al-Mina'a SC in the Iraqi Premier League.

== Club career ==
On January 9, 2012, Sandaogo signed for Algerian club MC Oran. On January 28, 2012, he made his debut for the club as a starter in a league game against AS Khroub, scoring a goal in the 73rd minute of the game. He left the team in the end of the 2012–13 season, going to play in the Iraqi league.
