= Abdeslam Moussi =

Algerian footballer (born 1990)

Personal information
- Full name: Abdeslam Moussi
- Date of birth: June 14, 1990 (age 36)
- Place of birth: Constantine, Algeria
- Position: Attacking midfielder

Team information
- Current team: AS Khroub
- Number: 20

Senior career*
Years	Team	Apps	(Gls)
2011–2015	US Chaouia	–	(–)
2015–2017	MC Oran	26	(5)
2017	JSM Béjaïa	–	(–)
2018–2019	RC Relizane	–	(–)
2019–	AS Khroub	–	(–)
- * Club domestic league appearances and goals as of July 21, 2019 (UTC)

Abdeslam Moussi (born June 14, 1990) is an Algerian footballer who plays for AS Khroub in the Algerian Ligue Professionnelle 2.

== Career ==
=== Club career ===
Moussi started his professional career with US Chaouia. In June 2015, he signed a contract with MC Oran.

=== International career ===
In January 2016, Moussi joined Algeria A' national team.
