= Mounir Fekih =

Algerian footballer (born 1993)

Personal information
- Date of birth: 20 April 1993 (age 33)
- Position: Forward

Team information
- Current team: USM El Harrach
- Number: 13

Senior career*
Years	Team	Apps	(Gls)
2013–2015	MC Oran	15	(3)
2015–2016	USM Blida	9	(1)
2016	A Bou Saâda	?	(?)
2017–	USM El Harrach	8	(1)
- * Club domestic league appearances and goals as of 2018

Mounir Fekih (born 20 April 1993) is an Algerian footballer who plays for USM El Harrach in the Algerian Ligue Professionnelle 2 as a forward.
