= Mohamed Reda Ouamane =

Algerian footballer (born 1983)

Personal information
- Full name: Mohamed Reda Ouamane
- Date of birth: June 26, 1983 (age 43)
- Place of birth: Oran, Algeria
- Position: Goalkeeper

Team information
- Current team: SA Mohammadia

Senior career*
Years	Team	Apps	(Gls)
1999–2005	MC Oran	-	(-)
2005–2014	MC Alger	-	(-)
2010–2013	MC Oran	11	(0)
2013–	SA Mohammadia	0	(0)
- * Club domestic league appearances and goals as of 1 October 2013 (UTC)

Mohamed Reda Ouamane (born June 26, 1983, in Oran) is an Algerian football player. He is currently playing for SA Mohammadia in the Algerian Ligue 2.

== Club career ==
Sofiane Bouterbiat return and signed to MC Oran in the summer of 2010, joining them on a free transfer from MC Alger.
