= Chemseddine Nessakh =

Algerian footballer (born 1988)

Personal information
- Full name: Chemseddine Nessakh
- Date of birth: January 4, 1988 (age 38)
- Place of birth: Oran, Algeria
- Position: Defender

Team information
- Current team: GC Mascara
- Number: 5

Youth career
- –2006: ASM Oran

Senior career*
Years	Team	Apps	(Gls)
2006–2009	ASM Oran		(-)
2009–2012	JS Kabylie	57	(5)
2012–2013	ASO Chlef	13	(2)
2013–2017	MC Oran	91	(6)
2017–2018	ES Sétif	19	(1)
2018–2022	CR Belouizdad	95	(9)
2022–2024	ASO Chlef	44	(2)
2024–2025	NA Hussein Dey	0	(0)
2025–2026	ASM Oran	9	(0)
2026–	GC Mascara	0	(0)

International career^{‡}
2017–	Algeria	1	(0)
- * Club domestic league appearances and goals as of 14 September 2026 ‡ National team caps and goals as of 17 November 2017

Chemseddine Nessakh (Arabic: شمس الدين نساخ; born January 4, 1988) is an Algerian footballer who plays for GC Mascara in the Algerian Ligue 2 and the Algeria national team.

== Club career ==
On February 18, 2009, Nessakh was chosen as the best ASM Oran player for the first half of the 2008–09 Algerian Championnat National 2 season by the club's fans.

=== JS Kabylie ===
On December 26, 2009, Nessakh signed a two-and-a-half-year contract with JS Kabylie, joining them on a transfer from ASM Oran. The transfer fee was not disclosed. In his first season with the club, he made 11 league appearances, 4 of them as a starter. He also played an important role in JS Kabylie's run to the semi-finals of the 2010 CAF Champions League, playing in all of the team's group stage games, as well as their two semi-final matches against TP Mazembe.

On March 19, 2011, Nessakh scored the only goal in JS Kabylie's 1–0 win over ASC Tevragh-Zeïna in the first round of the 2011 CAF Confederation Cup. In the second leg in Mauritania, he scored another two goals to help JS Kabylie qualify 3–1 on aggregate to the second round.

== Career statistics ==
=== Club ===
As of 22 June 2023

Club	Season	League			Cup		Continental		Other		Total	
Club	Season	Division	Apps	Goals	Apps	Goals	Apps	Goals	Apps	Goals	Apps	Goals
JS Kabylie	2009–10	Division 1	11	0	3	1	1 (Note: All appearance(s) in CAF Champions League)	0	—		15	1
JS Kabylie	2010–11	Ligue 1	25	5	6	0	13 (Note: Eight appearances in CAF Champions League, five appearances and three goals in CAF Confederation Cup)	3	—		44	8
JS Kabylie	2011–12	Ligue 1	21	0	1	0	6 (Note: All appearance(s) in CAF Confederation Cup)	0	—		28	0
JS Kabylie	Total		57	5	10	1	20	3	—		87	9
ASO Chlef	2012–13	Ligue 1	13	2	1	0	3	0	—		17	2
MC Oran	2013–14	Ligue 1	21	0	0	0	—		—		21	0
MC Oran	2014–15	Ligue 1	26	0	3	1	—		—		29	1
MC Oran	2015–16	Ligue 1	17	1	—		2	0	—		19	1
MC Oran	2016–17	Ligue 1	27	2	1	0	—		—		28	2
MC Oran	Total		91	3	4	1	2	0	—		97	4
ES Sétif	2017–18	Ligue 1	19	1	2	1	5	1	1 (Note: All appearances in Algerian Super Cup)	0	27	3
CR Belouizdad	2018–19	Ligue 1	25	3	8	0	—		—		33	3
CR Belouizdad	2019–20	Ligue 1	19	1	2	0	4	0	—		25	1
CR Belouizdad	2020–21	Ligue 1	27	4	—		10	1	2 (Note: One appearance in Algerian Super Cup, One appearance in Algerian League Cup)	0	39	5
CR Belouizdad	2021–22	Ligue 1	24	1	—		10	1	—		34	2
CR Belouizdad	Total		95	10	10	0	24	2	2	0	131	12
ASO Chlef	2022–23	Ligue 1	19	0	6	1	—		—		25	1
Career total			294	21	33	4	64	6	3	0	394	31

== Honours ==
JS Kabylie

- Algerian Cup: 2010–11

ES Sétif

- Algerian Super Cup: 2017

CR Belouizdad

- Ligue 1: 2019–20, 2020–21, 2021–22
- Algerian Cup: 2019
- Algerian Super Cup: 2019

ASO Chlef

- Algerian Cup: 2022–23
