= Cédric N'Doumbé =

Cameroonian footballer

Personal information
- Full name: Cédric Aristide N'Doumbé Bosso
- Date of birth: 11 October 1990 (age 36)
- Place of birth: Yaoundé, Cameroon
- Height: 1.72 m (5 ft 8 in)
- Position: Midfielder

Youth career
- 2005–2007: AS Cetef
- 2007–2008: Anderlecht

Senior career*
Years	Team	Apps	(Gls)
2009–2011	Nîmes	3	(0)
2010–2011	→ AS Cherbourg (loan)	9	(1)
2011–2012	US Ivry	7	(1)
2012–2014	AS Cherbourg	49	(6)
2014–2015	Trélissac	4	(2)
2015	MC Oran	2	(0)
2016–?	AS Cherbourg		
Total		74	(10)
- * Club domestic league appearances and goals

Cédric Aristide N'Doumbé Bosso (born 11 October 1990) is a Cameroonian former professional footballer who played as a midfielder.

== Club career ==
Born in Yaoundé, Cameroon, N’Doumbé moved to Belgium at the age of 16 and joined Anderlecht's youth academy. After being released by Anderlecht, he trialled with French club Nîmes and earned a professional contract.

In January 2011, N’Doumbé signed with AS Cherbourg on loan, achieving promotion to Championnat National. Having spent the 2011–12 season with US Ivry, he returned to Cherbourg, where he stayed for the two seasons, one in the Championnat National and one in Championnat de France Amateur. He moved to Trélissac in 2014.

In January 2015, he signed for Algerian club MC Oran. He subsequently had stints in Finland and Sweden.

He had a third spell with Cherbourg from 2016.

N’Doumbé also played for Tourlaville, Flers, and Bayeux, all based in the region of Cotentin.

He was with French lower-league side Pointe Hague in the 2020–21 season, playing in Régional 2.

== International career ==
With the Cameroon U20 national team N'Doumbé took part in the 2009 African Youth Championship, reaching the final with his country.
