= Mohamed Megherbi =

Algerian footballer (born 1984)

Personal information
- Full name: Mohamed Megherbi
- Date of birth: May 6, 1984 (age 42)
- Place of birth: Oran, Algeria
- Position: Defender

Team information
- Current team: RC Relizane

Senior career*
| Years | Team | Apps | (Gls) |
| 2002–2010 | ASM Oran | - | (-) |
| 2010–2012 | MC Alger | 36 | (2) |
| 2012–2014 | MC Oran | 0 | (0) |
| 2014– | RC Relizane | 0 | (0) |
- * Club domestic league appearances and goals as of 00:00, June 25, 2012 (UTC)

Mohamed Megherbi (born May 6, 1984, in Oran) is an Algerian football player. He currently plays for RC Relizane in the Algerian Ligue Professionnelle 2.

== Club career ==
On December 30, 2009, Megherbi signed a 2 1/2-year contract with MC Alger, joining them on a transfer from ASM Oran. MC Alger paid a transfer fee of 5 million Algerian dinars for his services. In June 2012, he returned to Oran and signed with MC Oran for two years.

== Honours ==
- Won the Algerian Ligue Professionnelle 1 once with MC Alger in 2010
