= Sofiane Bouterbiat =

Algerian footballer (born 1983)

Personal information
- Date of birth: December 5, 1983 (age 42)
- Place of birth: Oran, Algeria
- Position: Midfielder

Team information
- Current team: MC El Eulma
- Number: 6

Senior career*
Years	Team	Apps	(Gls)
	RCG Oran	-	(-)
	SCM Oran	-	(-)
2010–2011	USM Annaba	25	(0)
2011–2014	MC Oran	68	(0)
2014–	MC El Eulma	-	(-)
- * Club domestic league appearances and goals as of 20:30, 25 September 2012 (UTC)

Sofiane Bouterbiat (born December 5, 1983) is an Algerian football player. He is currently playing for MC El Eulma in the Algerian Ligue Professionnelle 1.

== Club career ==
Sofiane Bouterbiat signed with MC Oran in the summer of 2011, joining them on a free transfer from USM Annaba.
