= Abdelmadjid Benatia =

Algerian football midfielder (born 1984)

Personal information
- Full name: Abdelmadjid Benatia
- Date of birth: 12 December 1984 (age 41)
- Place of birth: Oran, Algeria
- Position: Midfielder

Team information
- Current team: CS Constantine
- Number: 31

Senior career*
Years	Team	Apps	(Gls)
2002–2004	ASM Oran	22	(0)
2004–2005	MC Oran	30	(1)
2006–2008	CR Belouizdad	27	(0)
2008–2012	MC Oran	64	(3)
2012–2013	USM Bel Abbès	22	(0)
2013–2014	CS Constantine		
2014	MC Oran		
2015–2016	WA Tlemcen		
2016–2017	SA Mohammadia		

International career^{‡}
2005–2006	Algeria U23	12	(0)
2005–2006	Algeria	6	(0)
- * Club domestic league appearances and goals as of July 2013 ‡ National team caps and goals as of November 2009

Abdelmadjid Benatia (Arabic: عبد المجيد بن عطية; born 12 December 1984) is a former Algerian international football player. He played as a midfielder, essentially for MC Oran in the Algerian Championship. He was part of the Algerian national U21 football team at the 2005 Islamic Solidarity Games.
