= Zoubir Ouasti =

Algerian footballer (born 1981)

Personal information
- Full name: Zoubir Ouasti
- Date of birth: 28 February 1981 (age 45)
- Place of birth: Oran, Algeria
- Height: 1.80 m (5 ft 11 in)
- Position: Defender

Team information
- Current team: MC Oran

Senior career*
Years	Team	Apps	(Gls)
1999–2005	MC Oran	72	(1)
2005–2007	CR Belouizdad	25	(0)
2007–2008	USM Annaba	-	(-)
2008–2011	MC Oran	-	(-)
2011–2012	ASM Oran	-	(-)
2012–2013	MC Oran	-	(-)
2013–2014	RC Relizane	-	(-)
2014–2015	MC Oran	-	(-)

International career^{‡}
2003	Algeria	1	(0)
- * Club domestic league appearances and goals as of January 2014 ‡ National team caps and goals as of January 2014

Zoubir Ouasti (born 28 February 1981) is an Algerian former international football player.

== Club career ==
- 2000-2005 MC Oran (Algeria)
- 2005-2007 CR Belouizdad (Algeria)
- 2007-2008 USM Annaba (Algeria)
- 2008-2011 MC Oran (Algeria)
- 2011-2012 ASM Oran (Algeria)
- 2012–2013. MC Oran (Algeria)
- 2013–2014. RC Relizane (Algeria)
- 2014–2015. MC Oran (Algeria)

== Honours ==
- Runner-up of the Arab Champions League once with MC Oran in 2001
- Runner-up of the Algerian Cup once with MC Oran in 2002
- Has 1 cap for the Algerian National Team
