= Eudes Dagoulou =

Central African Republic footballer

Personal information
- Full name: Eudes Cratia Dagoulou Koziade
- Date of birth: February 9, 1990 (age 36)
- Place of birth: Bimbo, Central African Republic
- Height: 1.78 m (5 ft 10 in)
- Position: Attacking midfielder

Team information
- Current team: Kalamata

Senior career*
| Years | Team | Apps | (Gls) |
| 2008–2010 | Olympic Real de Bangui | 55 | (12) |
| 2010–2011 | AS Pélican | 12 | (2) |
| 2011–2014 | MC Oran | 60 | (13) |
| 2014–2016 | ES Setif | 40 | (5) |
| 2016 | Al-Wehda | 6 | (0) |
| 2017–2018 | Burgan SC | 0 | (0) |
| 2018– | Kalamata | 0 | (0) |

International career^{‡}
| 2010– | Central African Republic | 17 | (1) |
- * Club domestic league appearances and goals as of 11:30, September 23, 2016 (EST) ‡ National team caps and goals as of 28 March 2018

Eudes Cratia Dagoulou Koziade (born 9 February 1990 in Bimbo) is a Central African Republic footballer who plays for Gamma Ethniki club Kalamata as an attacking midfielder.

== Club career ==
On August 28, 2011, Dagoulou signed for Algerian club MC Oran. On September 29, 2011, he made his debut for the club as a starter in a league game against USM Alger.

== International career ==
=== International goals ===
Scores and results list Central African Republic's goal tally first.

| No | Date | Venue | Opponent | Score | Result | Competition |
|---|---|---|---|---|---|---|
| 1. | 27 March 2018 | Stade de Marrakech, Marrakesh, Morocco | Kenya | 2–1 | 3–2 | Friendly |

== Honours ==
- Champion of the Central African Republic League for 3 times in 2000, 2001, 2004 with Olympic Real de Bangui
