= Zine El-Abidine Sebbah =

Algerian footballer (born 1987)

Personal information
- Full name: Mohamed Zine El-Abidine Sebbah
- Date of birth: 22 March 1987 (age 39)
- Place of birth: Oran, Algeria
- Height: 1.79 m (5 ft 10 in)
- Positions: Midfielder; defender

Team information
- Current team: ASM Oran

Senior career*
Years	Team	Apps	(Gls)
2007–2013	MC Oran	82	(4)
2013–2014	CS Constantine	16	(0)
2014–2016	ASM Oran	45	(1)
2016–2020	MC Oran	50	(1)
2020–2021	NA Hussein Dey	15	(2)
2022–	ASM Oran	0	(0)
- * Club domestic league appearances and goals as of 21 August 2022

Mohamed Zine El-Abidine Sebbah (born 22 March 1987) is an Algerian footballer who plays for ASM Oran.

== Career ==
Sebbah started his career with hometown club MC Oran, making his first team debut in a 4–1 victory over CR Belouizdad on 6 August 2009 in the 2009–10 Algerian Championnat National. He finished the season with 28 league appearances for Oran. Sebbah made 17 league appearances for Oran in the 2010–11 season, the first season following the formation of the professional Algerian Ligue Professionnelle 1.

== Honours ==
- Won the Algeria Cup for U-20 with MC Oran in 2005
