= Farid Bellabès =

Algerian footballer (born 1985)

Personal information
- Full name: Farid Bellabès
- Date of birth: October 20, 1985 (age 41)
- Place of birth: Oran, Algeria
- Position: Defender

Team information
- Current team: ES Mostaganem
- Number: 15

Senior career*
Years	Team	Apps	(Gls)
2005–2008	MC Oran	-	(-)
2008–2010	JS Kabylie	36	(1)
2010–2011	MC Oran	18	(0)
2011	USM Alger	0	(0)
2012–2017	MC Oran	12	(0)
2017–2018	SCM Oran	?	(0)
2018–	ES Mostaganem	?	(0)
- * Club domestic league appearances and goals as of 00:00, January 10, 2012 (UTC)

Farid Bellabès (born October 20, 1985) is an Algerian footballer. He played as a defender for ES Mostaganem in the Algerian Ligue Professionnelle 2.
