= Hicham Chérif =

Algerian footballer (born 1992)

Personal information
- Full name: Mohamed Hicham Chérif
- Date of birth: 1 January 1992 (age 34)
- Place of birth: Oran, Algeria
- Position: Striker

Team information
- Current team: USM Annaba

Youth career
- MC Oran

Senior career*
Years	Team	Apps	(Gls)
2009–2015	MC Oran	111	(13)
2015–2016	USM Blida	28	(3)
2016–2017	MC Oran	27	(7)
2017	NA Hussein Dey	6	(0)
2017–2018	MO Béjaïa	4	(0)
2018	ASM Oran	0	(0)
2019	WA Tlemcen		
2019–	USM Annaba		
- * Club domestic league appearances and goals as of 15 January 2018

Mohamed Hicham Chérif (born 1 January 1992) is an Algerian footballer who plays for USM Annaba in the Algerian Ligue Professionnelle 2.

== Club career ==
Hicham Chérif was formed in MC Oran, he start in the senior first division in the 2009–10 season.
