= 2024–25 CS Constantine season =

CS Constantine
2024–25 season
- Owner: ENTP
- President: Tahar Chelia (from 6 July 2024)
- Head coach: Kheïreddine Madoui (from 19 July 2024) (from 20 June 2025)
- Stadium: Chahid Hamlaoui Stadium
- Ligue 1: 10th
- Algerian Cup: Round of 64
- Confederation Cup: Semi-finals
- Top goalscorer: League: Abdennour Belhocini (7 goals); All: Abdennour Belhocini (10 goals)
Home colours	Away colours	Third colours

The 2024–25 season, is CS Constantine's 29th season and the club's 14th consecutive season in the top flight of Algerian football. In addition to the domestic league, CS Constantine are participating in this season's editions of the Algerian Cup and the Confederation Cup. On June 27, 2024, the federal office approved the calendar for the 2024–25 Ligue 1 season with the aim of ending on May 31, 2025. The first round is scheduled for September 14, this delay is motivated both by an extended end of the 2023–24 season but also by the holding of early presidential elections which will take place on September 7, 2024. However, the Ligue de Football Professionnel decided to postpone the start of the Ligue 1 by a week, on September 21.

== Review ==
=== Background ===
On June 29, 2024, CS Constantine has parted with its coach Abdelkader Amrani. The president of the club Abdelghani Gourari even affirmed that confidence had been renewed in the coach but it was he who did not want to continue. For his part, Amrani explains that he could not continue with players whose release he requested but whom the club kept. On July 6, 2024 CS Constantine changed president but it is still the same people who lead. SPA CS Constantine announced the appointment of Tahar Chelia as new president, replacing Abdelkader Gourari after two years in office. Moreover, it is yet another former president from before the Sonatrach era who was appointed general director Fersadou. On July 19, Kheïreddine Madoui is back at the technical helm of the club as the new coach. Madoui was received at the club headquarters by the general director Yacine Fersadou.

On December 21, 2024, during the match against NC Magra, CS Constantine scored a goal in the 97th minute. Validated at first, the goal will be validated at first by the referee Lotfi Bekouassa in the absence of the VAR but after discussing with his assistant referee Adel Abane, he will change his decision to cancel it. The FAF therefore published a press release to announce the suspension of referee Boukouassa as well as Adel Abane and that it was handing over the file to the arbitration committee to decide on this matter. Boukouassa finally signals an offside position of the scorer, after consulting the images on a smartphone. For his part, the linesman had not raised his flag. On June 20, 2025, CS Constantine and head coach Kheïreddine Madoui officially parted ways following a challenging season. Appointed in July 2024, Madoui announced his departure, citing unsatisfactory working conditions within the club. Despite guiding CSC to the semi-finals of the Confederation Cup, the team endured a disappointing finish to their domestic league campaign. A 2–2 home draw against JS Saoura in the final match of the season marked the conclusion of Madoui's tenure.

== Squad list ==
Players and squad numbers last updated on 5 February 2025.
Note: Flags indicate national team as has been defined under FIFA eligibility rules. Players may hold more than one non-FIFA nationality.

No.	Nat.	Position	Name	Date of birth (age)	Signed from
Goalkeepers
1	(Algeria)	GK	Kheireddine Boussouf	7 December 1987 (aged 36)	(Algeria) Paradou AC
16	(Algeria)	GK	Zakaria Bouhalfaya	11 August 1997 (aged 27)	(Algeria) ES Sétif
23	(Algeria)	GK	Abdelmalek Necir	6 September 1992 (aged 32)	(Algeria) NRB Teleghma
Defenders
3	(Algeria)	CB	Abdelmoumene Guessoum	5 May 2003 (aged 21)	(Algeria) Youth system
4	(Algeria)	CB	Chahine Bellaouel	27 December 2000 (aged 23)	(Tunisia) CA Bizertin
5	(Senegal)	CB	Mélo Ndiaye	23 November 1994 (aged 29)	(Morocco) Youssoufia Berrechid
8	(Algeria)	LB	Houari Baouche	24 December 1995 (aged 28)	(Algeria) USM Alger
12	(Algeria)	RB	Oussama Meddahi	14 February 1991 (aged 33)	(Algeria) NA Hussein Dey
19	(Algeria)	CB	Chamseddine Derradji	15 April 1992 (aged 32)	(Algeria) NC Magra
24	(Algeria)	RB	Aimen Bouguerra	10 January 1997 (aged 26)	(Algeria) CR Belouizdad
25	(Algeria)	CB	Miloud Rebiaï	12 December 1993 (aged 30)	(Algeria) CR Belouizdad
29	(Algeria)	CB	Achraf Boudrama	25 May 1996 (aged 28)	(Algeria) CR Belouizdad
Midfielders
6	(Algeria)	DM	Mohamed Benchaira	10 January 1992 (aged 32)	(Algeria) JS Kabylie
7	(Algeria)	AM	Abdennour Belhocini	18 August 1996 (aged 28)	(Tunisia) Club Africain
10	(Algeria)	AM	Brahim Dib	6 July 1993 (aged 31)	(Algeria) AS Aïn M'lila
14	(Burkina Faso)	DM	Salifou Tapsoba	19 October 2002 (aged 21)	(Tunisia) ES Métlaoui
15	(Algeria)	MF	Firaz Saibi	22 March 2003 (aged 21)	(Algeria) Youth system
18	(Algeria)	DM	Messala Merbah	22 July 1994 (aged 30)	(Algeria) USM Alger
21	(Algeria)	MF	Zakaria Messibah	16 October 1995 (aged 28)	(Algeria) NC Magra
27	(Algeria)	AM	Anwar Khemmar	10 November 2003 (aged 20)	(Algeria) Youth system
30	(Algeria)	AM	Feth-Allah Tahar	22 January 1994 (aged 30)	(Algeria) MC Alger
Forwards
9	(Algeria)	FW	Zakaria Benchaâ	12 June 1997 (aged 27)	Unattached
11	(Algeria)	FW	Mounder Temine	15 September 2001 (aged 23)	(Algeria) Youth system
13	(Cameroon)	FW	Nkembe Enow	11 November 1999 (aged 24)	(Algeria) ES Sétif
20	(Algeria)	FW	Dadi El Hocine Mouaki	11 September 1996 (aged 28)	(Algeria) JS Kabylie
22	(Nigeria)	ST	Tosin Omoyele	3 August 1996 (aged 28)	(Algeria) USM Khenchela
26	(Algeria)	FW	Abdelkader Kaibou	12 September 1997 (aged 27)	(Morocco) MC Oujda

== Transfers ==
=== In ===
==== Summer ====
Date	Pos	Player	Moving from	Fee	Source
18 July 2024	FW	(Nigeria) Tosin Omoyele	USM Khenchela	Free transfer	
20 July 2024	FW	(Algeria) Dadi El Hocine Mouaki	JS Kabylie	Free transfer	
20 July 2024	DF	(Algeria) Achraf Boudrama	CR Belouizdad	Free transfer	
21 August 2024	CB	(Senegal) Mélo Ndiaye	(Morocco) Youssoufia Berrechid	Free transfer	
21 August 2024	DM	(Burkina Faso) Salifou Tapsoba	(Tunisia) ES Métlaoui	Free transfer	
28 August 2024	AM	(Algeria) Feth-Allah Tahar	MC Alger	Free transfer	

=== Out ===
==== Summer ====
Date	Pos	Player	Moving to	Fee	Source
4 July 2024	DF	(Algeria) Mohamed Amine Madani	JS Kabylie	Free transfer	
9 July 2024	DF	(Algeria) Nasreddine Zaalani	(Bahrain) Al-Khaldiya SC	Free transfer	
28 July 2024	MF	(Algeria) Hadji Chekal Affari	JS Kabylie	Free transfer	
7 November 2024	FW	(Gabon) Axel Méyé	(Qatar) Mesaimeer SC	Free transfer	

== Competitions ==
=== Overview ===
Competition	Record								Started round	Final position / round	First match	Last match
Competition	G	W	D	L	GF	GA	GD	Win %	Started round	Final position / round	First match	Last match
Ligue 1	30	9	12	9	31	31	+0	30.00	—N/a	8th	27 September 2024	20 June 2025
Algerian Cup	1	0	0	1	0	1	−1	0.00	Round of 64		5 February 2025	
Confederation Cup	14	9	2	3	22	13	+9	64.29	First round	Semi-finals	17 August 2024	27 April 2025
Total	45	18	14	13	53	45	+8	40.00				

Updated to match played 20 June 2025
Source: Competitions

=== Ligue 1 ===
==== League table ====
Pos	Team	Pld	W	D	L	GF	GA	GD	Pts
8	MC Oran	30	12	4	14	32	33	−1	40
9	USM Khenchela	30	11	7	12	28	38	−10	40
10	CS Constantine	30	9	12	9	31	31	0	39
11	Olympique Akbou	30	9	10	11	24	23	+1	37
12	MC El Bayadh	30	9	9	12	23	26	−3	36

Source: the-sports.org
Rules for classification: 1) points; 2) head-to-head points; 3) head-to-head goal difference; 4) goal difference; 5) total goals; 6) fairplay ranking; 7) playoff.

==== Results summary ====
Overall								Home						Away					
Pld	W	D	L	GF	GA	GD	Pts	W	D	L	GF	GA	GD	W	D	L	GF	GA	GD
30	9	12	9	31	31	0	39	6	7	2	20	15	+5	3	5	7	11	16	−5

Last updated: 20 June 2025.
Source: Competitive matches

==== Results by round ====
Round	1	2	3	4	5	6	7	8	9	10	11	12	13	14	15	16	17	18	19	20	21	22	23	24	25	26	27	28	29	30
Ground	H	A	H	A	H	H	A	H	A	H	A	H	A	H	A	A	H	A	H	A	A	H	A	H	A	H	A	H	A	H
Result	D	D	D	W	W	W	L	W	L	W	D	L	W	D	L	D	D	L	D	L	W	D	D	W	L	W	D	L	L	D
Position	8	11	11	6	4	1	3	2	3	2	2	4	3	4	6	5	5	6	8	9	7	8	9	5	7	6	5	6	7	10

Updated to match(es) played on 21 June 2025. Source: Competitive matches
A = Away; H = Home; W = Win; D = Draw; L = Loss

==== Matches ====
The league fixtures were announced on 11 July 2024.

All times are local, WAT (UTC+1).

Win Draw Loss Postponed

27 September 2024 Round 2	ASO Chlef	0–0	CS Constantine	Chlef
18:00		Report		Stadium: Mohamed Boumezrag Stadium; Referee: Youcef Taieb Bouderbal

2 October 2024 Round 1	CS Constantine	0–0	ES Mostaganem	Mila
16:00		Report		Stadium: Belkacem Belaid Stadium; Attendance: 0 (close doors); Referee: Abdelali Ibrir

6 October 2024 Round 3	CS Constantine	1–1	MC Alger	Constantine
16:00	Belhocini 83'	Report	Naidji 73'	Stadium: Ramadane Ben Abdelmalek Stadium; Attendance: 0 (close doors); Referee: Houssam Benyahia

12 October 2024 Round 4	JS Kabylie	2–3	CS Constantine	Tizi Ouzou
17:45	Boudebouz 38' (pen.), 90+9' (pen.)	Report	Dib 13', 61', 64'	Stadium: Hocine Aït Ahmed Stadium; Referee: Yahia Dehar; VAR: Rafik Aouina

19 October 2024 Round 5	CS Constantine	2–1	Paradou AC	Constantine
16:00	Temine 11'; Dib 31'	Report	Ramdaoui 4'	Stadium: Chahid Hamlaoui Stadium; Attendance: 0 (close doors); Referee: Akram Mechairia

25 October 2024 Round 6	CS Constantine	2–1	ES Sétif	Constantine
16:00	Tahar 6'; Belhocini 40'	Report	Bacha 21'	Stadium: Chahid Hamlaoui Stadium; Attendance: 0 (close doors); Referee: Nabil Boukhalfa

2 November 2024 Round 7	MC Oran	1–0	CS Constantine	Bir El Djir
17:45	Motrani 9'	Report		Stadium: Miloud Hadefi Stadium; Attendance: 0 (close doors); Referee: Anes Azrine

8 November 2024 Round 8	CS Constantine	2–1	Olympique Akbou	Constantine
17:45	Omoyele 46'; Dib 76'	Report	Askar 88' (pen.)	Stadium: Chahid Hamlaoui Stadium; Referee: Rafik Aouina; VAR: Abderahmane Sahraoui

15 November 2024 Round 9	USM Khenchela	1–0	CS Constantine	Khenchela
15:00	Boumechra 90+2'	Report		Stadium: Amar Hamam Stadium; Referee: Abdelali Ibrir

21 November 2024 Round 10	CS Constantine	1–0	USM Alger	Constantine
20:00	Boudrama 34'	Report		Stadium: Chahid Hamlaoui Stadium; Referee: Youcef Taieb Bouderbal; VAR: Fateh Harkat

2 December 2024 Round 11	US Biskra	1–1	CS Constantine	Biskra
17:30	Bouziane 39'	Report	Enow 89'	Stadium: 18 February Stadium; Referee: Alaa Bouab; VAR: Tahar Boudjemaa

21 December 2024 Round 14	CS Constantine	0–0	NC Magra	Constantine
16:30		Report		Stadium: Chahid Hamlaoui Stadium; Referee: Lotfi Bekouassa

27 December 2024 Round 15	JS Saoura	2–0	CS Constantine	Béchar
16:00	Bouchiba 22'; Ghorab 64'	Report		Stadium: 20 August 1955 Stadium; Referee: Nabil Boukhalfa

25 January 2025 Round 12	CS Constantine	0–1	MC El Bayadh	Constantine
16:00		Report	Chahrour 20'	Stadium: Chahid Hamlaoui Stadium; Referee: Rafik Aouina; VAR: Redouane Allou

30 January 2025 Round 13	CR Belouizdad	0–2	CS Constantine	Algiers
19:00		Report	Belhocini 79', 86'	Stadium: Stade du 5 Juillet; Referee: Yahia Dehar; VAR: Rafik Aouina

13 February 2025 Round 16	ES Mostaganem	0–0	CS Constantine	Mostaganem
16:00		Report		Stadium: Mohamed Bensaïd Stadium; Attendance: 0 (close doors); Referee: Mustapha Ghorbal; VAR: Youcef Taieb Bouderbal

18 February 2025 Round 17	CS Constantine	2–2	ASO Chlef	Constantine
17:00	Belhocini 4' (pen.); Temine 19'	Report	Agbagno 12' (pen.); Avotor 90+1'	Stadium: Chahid Hamlaoui Stadium; Attendance: 0 (close doors); Referee: Tahar Boudjemaa; VAR: Lahlou Benbraham

28 February 2025 Round 18	MC Alger	2–1	CS Constantine	Algiers
19:00	Kipré 10'; Bangoura 73'	Report	Temine 4'	Stadium: Stade du 5 Juillet; Referee: Nabil Boukhalfa; VAR: Redouane Allou

8 March 2025 Round 19	CS Constantine	1–1	JS Kabylie	Constantine
22:00	Tahar 82'	Report	Berkane 16'	Stadium: Chahid Hamlaoui Stadium; Referee: Alaa Bouab; VAR: Akram Mechairia

14 March 2025 Round 20	Paradou AC	2–0	CS Constantine	Algiers
22:00	Boulbina 18' (pen.), 90+3'	Report		Stadium: Stade du 5 Juillet; Referee: Yahia Dehar; VAR: Youcef Taieb Bouderbal

11 May 2025 Round 25	USM Alger	2–1	CS Constantine	Algiers
19:00	Mahrouz 77'; Benayad 88'	Report	Belhocini 45+1'	Stadium: Stade du 5 Juillet; Referee: Youcef Taieb Bouderbal; VAR: Lahlou Benbraham

15 May 2025 Round 21	ES Sétif	0–1	CS Constantine	Sétif
18:00		Report	Benchaâ 53'	Stadium: 8 May 1945 Stadium; Referee: Anes Azrine; VAR: Redouane Allou

18 May 2025 Round 26	CS Constantine	3–0	US Biskra	Constantine
18:00	Merbah 76'; Benchaira 79'; Belhocini 83'	Report		Stadium: Chahid Hamlaoui Stadium; Referee: Tayeb Benyabka

22 May 2025 Round 22	CS Constantine	2–2	MC Oran	Constantine
18:00	Benchaâ 9'; Dib 19'	Report	Kerroum 59'; Baakoh 63'	Stadium: Chahid Hamlaoui Stadium; Referee: Haitham Ghouti; VAR: Mehdi Oukil

27 May 2025 Round 27	MC El Bayadh	1–1	CS Constantine	El Bayadh
17:00	Toumi Sief 55' (pen.)	Report	Messibah 22'	Stadium: Zakaria Medjdoub Stadium; Referee: Ayoub Belhachemi

30 May 2025 Round 23	Olympique Akbou	0–0	CS Constantine	Béjaïa
17:00		Report		Stadium: Maghrebi Unity Stadium; Referee: Rafik Aouina; VAR: Hamza Bouzit

3 June 2025 Round 24	CS Constantine	2–1	USM Khenchela	Constantine
17:00	Temine 37'; Rebiaï 51'	Report	Boumechra 23'	Stadium: Ramadane Ben Abdelmalek Stadium; Referee: Abdelali Ibrir

12 June 2025 Round 28	CS Constantine	0–2	CR Belouizdad	Constantine
21:00		Report	Mahious 21' (pen.); Belkhir 86'	Stadium: Chahid Hamlaoui Stadium; Referee: Nabil Boukhalfa; VAR: Mehdi Oukil

17 June 2025 Round 29	NC Magra	2–1	CS Constantine	Magra
17:30	Amrane 7', 17'	Report	Nkembe 65'	Stadium: Boucheligue Brothers Stadium; Referee: Lahlou Benbraham

20 June 2025 Round 30	CS Constantine	2–2	JS Saoura	Constantine
18:00	Temine 38'; Bouteldja 74'	Report	Bédi 45+2'; Bentaleb 80'	Stadium: Chahid Hamlaoui Stadium; Referee: Redouane Allou

=== Algerian Cup ===
5 February 2025 Round of 64	Olympique Akbou	1–0	CS Constantine	Béjaïa
15:00	Lachhab 3'	Report		Stadium: Maghrebi Unity Stadium; Referee: Houssam Benyahia

=== Confederation Cup ===
==== Qualifying rounds ====
In the qualifying rounds, each tie will be played on a home-and-away two-legged basis. If the aggregate score will be tied after the second leg, the away goals rule was applied, and if still tied, extra time will not be played, and the penalty shoot-out will be used to determine the winner (Regulations III. 13 & 14). The draw for the qualifying rounds was held on 11 July 2024, 12:00 GMT (15:00 local time, UTC+3), at the CAF headquarters in Cairo, Egypt.

===== First round =====
17 August 2024 First leg	CS Constantine (Algeria)	2–0	(Rwanda) Police FC	Constantine
19:00 UTC+1	Dib 45' (pen.); Omoyele 78'	Report		Stadium: Chahid Hamlaoui Stadium; Referee: Daouda Guèye (Senegal)
Note: Lineup for CS Constantine – Bouhalfaya, Meddahi, Rebiaï, Derradji, Baouche, Merbah, Benchaira (substituted off) 70' (Benmessabih, (substituted on) 70'), Dib (c), Belhocini, Benchaâ (substituted off) 58' (Omoyele, (substituted on) 58'), Mouaki (substituted off) 70' (Temine, (substituted on) 70').

25 August 2024 Second leg	Police FC (Rwanda)	1–2 (1–4 agg.)	(Algeria) CS Constantine	Kigali
15:00 UTC+2	Ani Elijah 18'	Report	Benchaâ 40'; Temine 60'	Stadium: Kigali Pelé Stadium; Referee: Gerson Adolfo (Equatorial Guinea)
Note: Lineup for CS Constantine – Bouhalfaya, Meddahi, Baouche, Rebiaï, Derradji, Merbah, Dib (c), Benchaira, Benchaâ, Belhocini, Temine.

===== Second round =====
13 September 2024 First leg	Nsoatreman (Ghana)	0–2	(Algeria) CS Constantine	Accra
15:00 UTC+0	Mohammed Issaka (yellow card) 15'	Report	Benchaâ 13', 29'; Dib (yellow card) 50'; Belhocini (yellow card) 70'	Stadium: Accra Sports Stadium; Referee: Masangune Louis Mwamba (DR Congo)
Note: Lineup for CS Constantine – Bouhalfaya, Meddahi, Baouche, Derradji, Boudrama, Merbah, Dib (c) (substituted off) 89' (Tahar, (substituted on) 89'), Benchaira, Benchaâ (substituted off) 89' (Bellaouel, (substituted on) 89'), Belhocini (substituted off) 74' (Temine, (substituted on) 74'), Mouaki (substituted off) 62' (Benmessabih, (substituted on) 62').

21 September 2024 Second leg	CS Constantine (Algeria)	1–0 (3–0 agg.)	(Ghana) Nsoatreman	Constantine
18:00 UTC+1	Benchaâ 19'; Boudrama (yellow card) 46'; Merbah (yellow card) 57'	Report	Kudjoe (yellow card) 35'	Stadium: Chahid Hamlaoui Stadium; Referee: Thabani Ruzario (Zimbabwe)
Note: Lineup for CS Constantine – Bouhalfaya, Meddahi (substituted off) 89' (Bouguerra, (substituted on) 89'), Baouche, Derradji, Boudrama, Merbah, Dib (c) (substituted off) 89' (Temine, (substituted on) 89'), Benchaira, Benchaâ (substituted off) 90' (Omoyele, (substituted on) 90'), Belhocini (substituted off) 66' (Rebiaï, (substituted on) 66'), Mouaki (substituted off) 77' (Tahar, (substituted on) 77').

==== Group stage ====
The draw for the group stage was held on 7 October 2024, 10:00 GMT (13:00 local time, UTC+3), in Cairo, Egypt. The 16 winners of the second round of qualifying rounds will be drawn into four groups of four. The teams were seeded by their performances in the CAF competitions for the previous five seasons (CAF 5-year ranking points shown next to every team). Each group will contain one team from each of Pot 1 and Pot 2, and two teams from Pot 3, and each team will be allocated to the positions in their group according to their pot.

Pos	Team	Pld	W	D	L	GF	GA	GD	Pts	Qualification	SSC	CSC	FCB	CSS
1	(Tanzania) Simba	6	4	1	1	8	4	+4	13	Advance to knockout stage	—	2–0	1–0	2–1
2	(Algeria) CS Constantine	6	4	0	2	12	6	+6	12	Advance to knockout stage	2–1	—	4–0	3–0
3	(Angola) Bravos do Maquis	6	2	1	3	7	14	−7	7		1–1	3–2	—	3–2
4	(Tunisia) CS Sfaxien	6	1	0	5	7	10	−3	3		0–1	0–1	4–0	—

Source: CAF

27 November 2024 1	CS Sfaxien (Tunisia)	0–1	(Algeria) CS Constantine	Tunis
17:00 UTC+1		Report	Dib 81'	Stadium: Stade Hammadi Agrebi; Referee: Mahmoud El Banna (Egypt)

8 December 2024 2	CS Constantine (Algeria)	2–1	(Tanzania) Simba	Constantine
17:00 UTC+1	Hamza 46' (o.g.); Dib 50'	Report	Husseini 24'	Stadium: Chahid Hamlaoui Stadium; Referee: Godfrey Nkhakananga (Malawi)

15 December 2024 3	Bravos do Maquis (Angola)	3–2	(Algeria) CS Constantine	Luanda
17:00 UTC+1	Paciência 17' (pen.); Francis 21'; Célio 90+4'	Report	Mouaki 63'; Bellaouel 79'	Stadium: Estádio 11 de Novembro; Referee: Peter Waweru (Kenya)

5 January 2025 4	CS Constantine (Algeria)	4–0	(Angola) Bravos do Maquis	Constantine
20:00 UTC+1	Rebiaï 41'; Omoyele 45+1'; Belhocini 86'; Mouaki 89'	Report		Stadium: Chahid Hamlaoui Stadium; Referee: Issa Mouhamed (Benin)

12 January 2025 5	CS Constantine (Algeria)	3–0	(Tunisia) CS Sfaxien	Constantine
17:00 UTC+1	Benchaâ 30', 70'; Temine 90+4'	Report		Stadium: Chahid Hamlaoui Stadium; Referee: Amin Omar (Egypt)

19 January 2025 6	Simba (Tanzania)	2–0	(Algeria) CS Constantine	Dar es Salaam
16:00 UTC+3	Denis 61'; Ateba 79'	Report		Stadium: Benjamin Mkapa Stadium; Attendance: 0 (close doors); Referee: Celso Alvação (Mozambique)

==== knockout stage ====
Each tie in the knockout phase will be played over two legs, with each team playing one leg at home. The team that will score more goals on aggregate over the two legs will advance to the next round. If the aggregate score will be level, the away goals rule will be applied, i.e. the team that will score more goals away from home over the two legs will advance. If away goals will be also equal, then extra time will not be played and the winners will be decided by a penalty shoot-out (Regulations III. 26 & 27). The bracket was decided after the draw for the knockout stage, which was held on 20 February 2025, 17:00 AST (UTC+3) at the beIN Sports headquarters in Doha, Qatar.

===== Quarter-finals =====
2 April 2025 First leg	CS Constantine (Algeria)	1–1	(Algeria) USM Alger	Constantine
17:00 UTC+1	Temine 29'	Report	Mondeko 73'	Stadium: Chahid Hamlaoui Stadium; Referee: Dahane Beida (Mauritania)

9 April 2025 Second leg	USM Alger (Algeria)	1–1 (2–2 agg.) (3–4 p)	(Algeria) CS Constantine	Baraki
20:00 UTC+1	Alilet 25' (pen.)	Report	Belhocini 56'	Stadium: Nelson Mandela Stadium; Referee: Amin Omar (Egypt)
	Penalties
	Alilet (penalty missed); Mondeko (penalty scored); Mahrouz (penalty missed); Terrazas (penalty scored); Ghacha (penalty scored)		(penalty scored) Dib; (penalty scored) Boudrama; (penalty missed) Merbah; (penalty scored) Temine; (penalty scored) Bouguerra

===== Semi-finals =====
20 April 2025 First leg	RS Berkane (Morocco)	4–0	(Algeria) CS Constantine	Berkane
20:00 UTC+1	Mehri 1'; Bassène 21'; Lamlioui 54', 90+2'	Report		Stadium: Berkane Municipal Stadium; Referee: Ibrahim Mutaz (Libya)

27 April 2025 Second leg	CS Constantine (Algeria)	1–0	(Morocco) RS Berkane	Constantine
17:00 UTC+1	Belhocini 47'	Report		Stadium: Chahid Hamlaoui Stadium; Referee: Mahmood Ismail (Sudan)

== Squad information ==
=== Appearances and goals ===
As of 20 June 2025

No.	Pos	Player	Nat	Ligue 1			Algerian Cup			Confederation Cup			Total		
No.	Pos	Player	Nat	App	St	G	App	St	G	App	St	G	App	St	G
Goalkeepers
1	GK	Kheireddine Boussouf	(Algeria)	11	11	0	0	0	0	4	3	0	15	14	0
16	GK	Zakaria Bouhalfaya	(Algeria)	17	1	0	1	1	0	10	10	0	28	28	0
23	GK	Abdelmalek Necir	(Algeria)	2	2	0	0	0	0	0	0	0	2	2	0
Defenders
3	CB	Abdelmoumene Guessoum	(Algeria)	0	0	0	0	0	0	0	0	0	0	0	0
4	CB	Chahine Bellaouel	(Algeria)	17	12	0	1	1	0	11	10	1	29	23	1
5	CB	Mélo Ndiaye	(Senegal)	11	8	0	0	0	0	1	0	0	12	8	0
8	LB	Houari Baouche	(Algeria)	19	16	0	1	1	0	13	13	0	33	30	0
12	RB	Oussama Meddahi	(Algeria)	24	20	0	1	1	0	13	10	0	38	31	0
19	CB	Chamseddine Derradji	(Algeria)	17	16	0	0	0	0	5	4	0	22	20	0
24	RB	Aimen Bouguerra	(Algeria)	19	15	0	1	0	0	5	3	0	25	18	0
25	CB	Miloud Rebiaï	(Algeria)	23	20	1	1	1	0	9	5	1	33	26	2
29	CB	Achraf Boudrama	(Algeria)	19	18	1	0	0	0	11	11	0	30	29	1
Midfielders
6	MF	Mohamed Benchaira	(Algeria)	27	23	1	1	1	0	13	13	0	41	37	1
10	MF	Brahim Dib	(Algeria)	27	26	6	1	1	0	13	13	3	41	40	9
7	MF	Abdennour Belhocini	(Algeria)	19	15	7	1	1	0	10	7	3	30	23	10
14	DM	Salifou Tapsoba	(Burkina Faso)	10	1	0	0	0	0	5	0	0	15	1	0
15	MF	Firaz Saibi	(Algeria)	2	2	0	0	0	0	0	0	0	2	2	0
18	MF	Messala Merbah	(Algeria)	21	20	1	1	1	0	12	12	0	34	33	1
21	MF	Zakaria Messibah	(Algeria)	7	5	1	0	0	0	0	0	0	7	5	1
27	MF	Anwar Khemmar	(Algeria)	7	3	0	0	0	0	0	0	0	7	3	1
30	AM	Feth-Allah Tahar	(Algeria)	24	18	2	1	0	0	10	4	0	35	22	2
Forwards
9	FW	Zakaria Benchaâ	(Algeria)	21	16	2	1	1	0	13	12	6	35	29	8
11	LW	Mounder Temine	(Algeria)	24	18	5	1	1	0	10	4	3	35	23	8
13	FW	Nkembe Enow	(Cameroon)	11	3	2	1	0	0	3	0	0	15	3	2
20	FW	Dadi El Hocine Mouaki	(Algeria)	23	11	0	1	0	0	10	3	2	33	14	2
22	FW	Tosin Omoyele	(Nigeria)	21	8	1	1	0	0	7	3	2	29	11	3
26	FW	Abdelkader Kaibou	(Algeria)	6	1	0	0	0	0	4	3	0	10	4	0
46	FW	Djaber Bouteldja	(Algeria)	1	0	1	0	0	0	4	3	0	1	0	1
Players transferred out during the season
21	FW	Amine Benmessabih	(Algeria)	6	1	0	0	0	0	2	0	0	8	1	0
Total				30		31	1		0	14		22	45		53

Last updated: 20 June 2025
Source: mondefootball.fr

=== Goalscorers ===
As of 21 June 2025

Includes all competitive matches.

No.	Nat.	Player	Pos.	L1	AC	C3	TOTAL
7	(Algeria)	Abdennour Belhocini	MF	7	0	3	10
10	(Algeria)	Brahim Dib	MF	6	0	3	9
11	(Algeria)	Mounder Temine	FW	5	0	3	8
9	(Algeria)	Zakaria Benchaâ	FW	2	0	6	8
22	(Nigeria)	Tosin Omoyele	FW	1	0	2	3
15	(Algeria)	Feth-Allah Tahar	MF	2	0	0	2
13	(Cameroon)	Nkembe Enow	FW	2	0	0	2
25	(Algeria)	Miloud Rebiaï	CB	1	0	1	2
20	(Algeria)	Dadi El Hocine Mouaki	FW	0	0	2	2
29	(Algeria)	Achraf Boudrama	DF	1	0	0	1
6	(Algeria)	Mohamed Benchaira	MF	1	0	0	1
18	(Algeria)	Messala Merbah	MF	1	0	0	1
4	(Algeria)	Chahine Bellaouel	CB	0	0	1	1
21	(Algeria)	Zakaria Messibah	MF	1	0	0	1
46	(Algeria)	Djaber Bouteldja	?	1	0	0	1
Own Goals				0	0	1	1
Totals				31	0	22	53

=== Clean sheets ===
As of 21 June 2025

					Clean sheets			
No.	Nat	Name	GP	GA	L 1	AC	C3	Total
1	(Algeria)	Kheireddine Boussouf	15	13	5	0	1	6
16	(Algeria)	Zakaria Bouhalfaya	28	28	4	0	6	10
23	(Algeria)	Abdelmalek Necir	2	4	0	0	0	0
		TOTALS		45	9	0	7	16
