= 2025–26 CS Constantine season =

CS Constantine
2025–26 season
- Owner: ENTP SPA
- President: Tarek Arama
- Head coach: Rusmir Cviko (from 14 July 2025) (until 5 December 2025); Lassaad Dridi (from 16 December 2025) (until 30 April 2026); Khaled Guerioune (c) (from 30 April 2026)
- Stadium: Chahid Hamlaoui Stadium
- Ligue 1: 9th
- Algerian Cup: Semi-finals
- Top goalscorer: League: Nassim L'Ghoul (6 goals); All: Brahim Dib (8 goals)
- Biggest win: CS Constantine 4–1 JS El Biar
- Biggest defeat: Paradou AC 5–3 CS Constantine
| Home colours | Away colours |

The 2025–26 season, is CS Constantine's 30th season and the club's 15th consecutive season in the top flight of Algerian football. In addition to the domestic league, CS Constantine are participating in this season's editions of the Algerian Cup. The Algerian Professional Football League (LFP) officially released the calendar for the 2025–26 Ligue 1 Mobilis season on July 10, 2025. The Ligue 1 will kick off on Thursday, August 21, 2025, and conclude with the 30th and final matchday on May 16, 2026. As in recent years, league matches will be held every Thursday, Friday, and Saturday, offering better scheduling balance and improved logistical conditions for clubs and broadcasters.

== Squad list ==
Players and squad numbers last updated on 31 January 2026.
Note: Flags indicate national team as has been defined under FIFA eligibility rules. Players may hold more than one non-FIFA nationality.

| No. | Nat. | Position | Name | Date of birth (age) | Signed from |
Goalkeepers
| 1 | (Algeria) | GK | Zakaria Bouhalfaya | 11 August 1997 (aged 28) | (Algeria) ES Sétif |
| 16 | (Algeria) | GK | Mohamed Khenniche | 1 July 2005 (aged 20) | (Algeria) Youth system |
| 23 | (Algeria) | GK | Abdelmalek Necir | 6 September 1992 (aged 32) | (Algeria) NRB Teleghma |
Defenders
| 2 | (Algeria) | RB | Abderrahmane Benadla | 24 May 2005 (aged 20) | (Algeria) GC Mascara |
| 4 | (Algeria) | CB | Ahmed Aït Abdesslem | 30 August 1997 (aged 27) | Unattached |
| 5 | (Senegal) | CB | Mélo Ndiaye | 23 November 1994 (aged 30) | (Morocco) Youssoufia Berrechid |
| 8 | (Algeria) | LB | Houari Baouche | 24 December 1995 (aged 29) | (Algeria) USM Alger |
| 12 | (Algeria) | RB | Oussama Meddahi | 14 February 1991 (aged 34) | (Algeria) NA Hussein Dey |
| 13 | (Algeria) | CB | Imadeddine Benmoussa | 21 May 2005 (aged 20) | (Algeria) IRB Laghouat |
| 19 | (Algeria) | CB | Chamseddine Derradji | 15 April 1992 (aged 33) | (Algeria) NC Magra |
| 25 | (Algeria) | CB | Miloud Rebiaï | 12 December 1993 (aged 31) | (Algeria) CR Belouizdad |
| 27 | (Algeria) | LB | Abdelmoumen Chikhi | 29 February 1996 (aged 29) | (Algeria) ES Sétif |
Midfielders
| 6 | (Algeria) | DM | Mohamed Benchaira | 10 January 1992 (aged 33) | (Algeria) JS Kabylie |
| 10 | (Algeria) | AM | Brahim Dib | 6 July 1993 (aged 32) | (Algeria) AS Ain M'lila |
| 14 | (Rwanda) | DM | Djihad Bizimana | 12 December 1996 (aged 28) | (Libya) Al Ahli |
| 15 | (Algeria) | CM | Mostafa Berkane | 21 October 2002 (aged 22) | (Algeria) NC Magra |
| 18 | (Algeria) | DM | Messala Merbah | 22 July 1994 (aged 31) | (Algeria) USM Alger |
| 30 | (Algeria) | AM | Feth-Allah Tahar | 22 January 1994 (aged 31) | (Algeria) MC Alger |
Forwards
| 7 | (Algeria) | LW | Moundhir Bouzekri | 16 December 2001 (aged 23) | (Algeria) MC Alger |
| 9 | (Togo) | ST | Yawo Agbagno | 25 May 2000 (aged 25) | (Libya) Al Ittihad |
| 11 | (Algeria) | LW | Dadi El Hocine Mouaki | 11 September 1996 (aged 28) | (Algeria) JS Kabylie |
| 17 | (Algeria) | LW | Aimen Lahmeri | 28 May 1996 (aged 29) | (Algeria) JS Kabylie |
| 20 | (Algeria) | ST | Ouadjih Khelfaoui | 2 March 2005 (aged 20) | (Algeria) Youth system |
| 21 | (Algeria) | ST | Hatem Grine | 17 August 2005 (aged 20) | (Algeria) Youth system |
| 22 | (Nigeria) | ST | Tosin Omoyele | 3 August 1996 (aged 29) | (Algeria) USM Khenchela |
| 24 | (Algeria) | LW | Ghiles Guenaoui | 2 August 1998 (aged 27) | (Algeria) USM Alger |
| 26 | (Algeria) | RW | Nassim L'Ghoul | 30 July 1997 (aged 28) | (Switzerland) Bellinzona |

== Transfers ==
=== In ===
==== Summer ====
| Date | Pos | Player | Moving from | Fee | Source |
|---|---|---|---|---|---|
| 25 July 2025 | LB | (Algeria) Abdelmoumen Chikhi | ES Sétif | Free transfer | |
| 25 July 2025 | LB | (Algeria) Abdellah Meddah | ES Mostaganem | Free transfer | |
| 25 July 2025 | AM | (Algeria) Mostafa Berkane | NC Magra | Free transfer | |
| 25 July 2025 | LW | (Algeria) Moundhir Bouzekri | MC Alger | Free transfer | |
| 25 July 2025 | RW | (Algeria) Rédha Bensayah | (Saudi Arabia) Al-Adalah FC | Free transfer | |
| 4 August 2025 | DF | (Algeria) Abdelhamid Driss | JS Kabylie | Free transfer | |

==== Winter ====
| Date | Pos | Player | Moving from | Fee | Source |
|---|---|---|---|---|---|
| 16 December 2025 | RW | (Algeria) Sofian Bahloul | Unattached | Free transfer | |
| 25 January 2026 | LW | (Algeria) Aimen Lahmeri | JS Kabylie | Free transfer | |
| 27 January 2026 | LW | (Algeria) Ghiles Guenaoui | USM Alger | Loan | |
| 29 January 2026 | CB | (Algeria) Ahmed Aït Abdesslem | Unattached | Free transfer | |
| 31 January 2026 | ST | (Togo) Yawo Agbagno | (Libya) Al Ittihad | 700,000 € | |
| 31 January 2026 | DW | (Rwanda) Djihad Bizimana | (Libya) Al Ahli | Free transfer | |

=== Out ===
==== Summer ====
| Date | Pos | Player | Moving to | Fee | Source |
|---|---|---|---|---|---|
| 14 July 2025 | DF | (Algeria) Aimen Bouguerra | MC Alger | Free transfer | |
| 15 July 2025 | FW | (Algeria) Zakaria Benchaâ | (Bahrain) Al-Fahaheel SC | Free transfer | |
| 31 July 2025 | DF | (Algeria) Chahine Bellaouel | JS Kabylie | Free transfer | |
| 31 July 2025 | MF | (Algeria) Abdennour Belhocini | CR Belouizdad | Free transfer | |

==== Winter ====
| Date | Pos | Player | Moving to | Fee | Source |
|---|---|---|---|---|---|
| 5 January 2026 | DM | (Burkina Faso) Salifou Tapsoba | (Tunisia) Stade Tunisien | Free transfer | |
| 20 January 2026 | RW | (Algeria) Rédha Bensayah | (Saudi Arabia) Al-Anwar | Free transfer | |
| 26 January 2026 | RW | (Algeria) Sofian Bahloul | Unattached | Free transfer (Released) | |
| 30 January 2026 | CB | (Algeria) Achraf Boudrama | Unattached | Free transfer (Released) | |

== Competitions ==
=== Overview ===
| Competition | Record | | | | | | | | Started round | Final position / round | First match | Last match |
| Competition | G | W | D | L | GF | GA | GD | Win % | Started round | Final position / round | First match | Last match |
|---|---|---|---|---|---|---|---|---|---|---|---|---|
| Ligue 1 | 30 | 11 | 10 | 9 | 35 | 30 | +5 | 36.67 | —N/a | 9th | 22 August 2025 | 5 June 2026 |
| Algerian Cup | 5 | 4 | 0 | 1 | 12 | 5 | +7 | 80.00 | Round of 64 | To be confirmed | 5 December 2025 | 5 June 2026 |
| Total | 35 | 15 | 10 | 10 | 47 | 35 | +12 | 42.86 | | | | |

Updated to match played 5 June 2026
Source: Competitions

=== Ligue 1 ===
==== League table ====
| Pos | Team | Pld | W | D | L | GF | GA | GD | Pts | Qualification or relegation |
|---|---|---|---|---|---|---|---|---|---|---|
| 7 | USM Khenchela | 30 | 12 | 8 | 10 | 37 | 37 | 0 | 44 | |
| 8 | ES Ben Aknoun | 30 | 11 | 10 | 9 | 41 | 39 | +2 | 43 | |
| 9 | CS Constantine | 30 | 11 | 10 | 9 | 35 | 30 | +5 | 43 | |
| 10 | USM Alger (Note: USM Alger qualified for the 2026–27 CAF Confederation Cup by winning the 2025–26 Algerian Cup) | 30 | 8 | 15 | 7 | 34 | 29 | +5 | 39 | Qualification for CAF Confederation Cup |
| 11 | ES Sétif | 30 | 10 | 9 | 11 | 33 | 36 | −3 | 39 | |

Source: lfp.dz
Rules for classification: 1) Points; 2) Head-to-head points; 3) Head-to-head goal difference; 4) First half goal difference; 5) First half total goals; 6) Fairplay ranking; 7) Playoff.

==== Results summary ====
| Overall | | | | | | | | Home | | | | | | Away | | | | | |
| Pld | W | D | L | GF | GA | GD | Pts | W | D | L | GF | GA | GD | W | D | L | GF | GA | GD |
|---|---|---|---|---|---|---|---|---|---|---|---|---|---|---|---|---|---|---|---|
| 30 | 11 | 10 | 9 | 35 | 30 | +5 | 43 | 8 | 6 | 1 | 20 | 9 | +11 | 3 | 4 | 8 | 15 | 21 | −6 |

Last updated: 5 June 2026.
Source: Competitive matches

==== Results by round ====
| Round | 1 | 2 | 3 | 4 | 5 | 6 | 7 | 8 | 9 | 10 | 11 | 12 | 13 | 14 | 15 | 16 | 17 | 18 | 19 | 20 | 21 | 22 | 23 | 24 | 25 | 26 | 27 | 28 | 29 | 30 |
|---|---|---|---|---|---|---|---|---|---|---|---|---|---|---|---|---|---|---|---|---|---|---|---|---|---|---|---|---|---|---|
| Ground | A | A | H | A | H | A | H | A | H | A | H | A | H | A | H | H | H | A | H | A | H | A | H | A | H | A | H | A | H | A |
| Result | W | L | W | L | D | D | D | L | W | L | W | L | W | D | W | D | W | W | W | W | D | D | D | L | L | D | W | L | D | L |
| Position | 1 | 8 | 4 | 7 | 6 | 7 | 8 | 12 | 10 | 10 | 9 | 10 | 7 | 10 | 7 | 7 | 4 | 4 | 2 | 2 | 2 | 2 | 2 | 6 | 6 | 6 | 6 | 6 | 7 | 9 |

Updated to match(es) played on 5 June 2026. Source: Competitive matches
A = Away; H = Home; W = Win; D = Draw; L = Loss

==== Matches ====
The league fixtures were announced on 31 July 2025.

All times are local, WAT (UTC+1).

Win Draw Loss Postponed

| 22 August 2025 Round 1 | MC El Bayadh | 0–2 | CS Constantine | El Bayadh |
| 17:00 | | Soccerway; LFP | Rebiaï 27'; Khelfaoui 85' | Stadium: Zakaria Medjdoub Stadium; Referee: Nabil Boukhalfa |

| 30 August 2025 Round 2 | ES Mostaganem | 2–0 | CS Constantine | Mostaganem |
| 19:00 | Benkhelifa 22'; Askar 70' | Soccerway; LFP | | Stadium: Mohamed Bensaïd Stadium; Referee: Anes Azrine |

| 5 September 2025 Round 3 | CS Constantine | 2–0 | MB Rouissat | Constantine |
| 18:00 | Berkane 36'; Dib 90+2' | Soccerway; LFP | | Stadium: Chahid Hamlaoui Stadium; Referee: Tahar Boudjemaa |

| 11 September 2025 Round 4 | ES Sétif | 2–1 | CS Constantine | Sétif |
| 17:45 | Zerrouki 49', 69' | Soccerway; LFP | Tahar 22' | Stadium: 8 May 1945 Stadium; Referee: Youcef Taieb Bouderbal |

| 19 September 2025 Round 5 | CS Constantine | 2–2 | ASO Chlef | Constantine |
| 17:45 | Mouaki 66', 77' | Soccerway; LFP | Sadahine 33'; Avotor 68' | Stadium: Chahid Hamlaoui Stadium; Referee: Akram Mechairia; VAR: Alaa Bouab |

| 28 September 2025 Round 6 | CR Belouizdad | 2–2 | CS Constantine | Belouizdad |
| 16:00 | Benayada 45+6' (pen.); Laouafi 87' (pen.) | Soccerway; LFP | Dib 27'; Benchaira 58' | Stadium: 20 August 1955 Stadium; Attendance: 0 (close doors); Referee: Mustapha Ghorbal; VAR: Tahar Boudjemaa |

| 4 October 2025 Round 7 | CS Constantine | 1–1 | USM Alger | Constantine |
| 17:45 | Dib 43' | Soccerway; LFP | Draoui 7' (pen.) | Stadium: Chahid Hamlaoui Stadium; Referee: Yahia Dehar; VAR: Fateh Harkat |

| 18 October 2025 Round 8 | ES Ben Aknoun | 1–0 | CS Constantine | Belouizdad |
| 15:00 | Lakehal 76' | Soccerway; LFP | | Stadium: 20 August 1955 Stadium; Referee: Nabil Boukhalfa |

| 25 October 2025 Round 9 | CS Constantine | 2–1 | Olympique Akbou | Constantine |
| 17:00 | Tahar 11'; Dib 53' | Soccerway; LFP | Hamroune 78' | Stadium: Chahid Hamlaoui Stadium; Referee: Fateh Harkat |

| 1 November 2025 Round 10 | MC Oran | 1–0 | CS Constantine | Bir El Djir |
| 18:00 | Moulay 56' | Soccerway; LFP | | Stadium: Miloud Hadefi Stadium; Referee: Tahar Boudjemaa |

| 9 November 2025 Round 11 | CS Constantine | 1–0 | JS Kabylie | Constantine |
| 17:45 | L'Ghoul 63' | Soccerway; LFP | | Stadium: Chahid Hamlaoui Stadium; Referee: Houssam Benyahia |

| 19 December 2025 Round 13 | CS Constantine | 2–0 | Paradou AC | Constantine |
| 17:00 | Mouaki 80'; Omoyele 90+4' | Soccerway; LFP | | Stadium: Chahid Hamlaoui Stadium; Referee: Alaa Bouab |

| 26 December 2025 Round 14 | USM Khenchela | 0–0 | CS Constantine | Khenchela |
| 15:00 | | Soccerway; LFP | | Stadium: Amar Hamam Stadium; Referee: Ayoub Belhachemi |

| 5 January 2026 Round 12 | MC Alger | 1–0 | CS Constantine | Douéra |
| 20:00 | Ferhat 90+6' | Soccerway; LFP | | Stadium: Ali La Pointe Stadium; Referee: Nabil Boukhalfa |

| 9 January 2026 Round 15 | CS Constantine | 1–0 | JS Saoura | Constantine |
| 16:00 | Dib 89' | Soccerway; LFP | | Stadium: Chahid Hamlaoui Stadium; Referee: Tahar Boudjemaa |

| 24 January 2026 Round 16 | CS Constantine | 1–1 | MC El Bayadh | Constantine |
| 17:00 | Rebiaï 8' (pen.) | Soccerway; LFP | Benyahia 59' | Stadium: Chahid Hamlaoui Stadium; Referee: Tayeb Benyebka |

| 3 February 2026 Round 17 | CS Constantine | 2–1 | ES Mostaganem | Constantine |
| 17:00 | Benchaira 24'; Derradji 89' | Soccerway; LFP | Benamar 55' | Stadium: Chahid Hamlaoui Stadium; Referee: Anes Azrine |

| 8 February 2026 Round 18 | MB Rouissat | 1–2 | CS Constantine | Ouargla |
| 15:00 | Merzougui 61' | Soccerway; LFP | Belaribi (o.g.); Merbah 90' | Stadium: 18 February Stadium; Referee: Ayoub Belhachemi |

| 13 February 2026 Round 19 | CS Constantine | 2–0 | ES Sétif | Constantine |
| 17:00 | L'Ghoul 69', 76' | Soccerway; LFP | | Stadium: Chahid Hamlaoui Stadium; Referee: Alaa Bouab |

| 20 February 2026 Round 20 | ASO Chlef | 0–2 | CS Constantine | Chlef |
| 22:00 | | Soccerway; LFP | Rebiaï 8'; Agbagno 60' | Stadium: Mohamed Boumezrag Stadium; Referee: Mehdi Oukil |

| 26 February 2026 Round 21 | CS Constantine | 0–0 | CR Belouizdad | Constantine |
| 22:00 | | Soccerway; LFP | | Stadium: Chahid Hamlaoui Stadium; Referee: Akram Mechairia |

| 8 March 2026 Round 22 | USM Alger | 0–0 | CS Constantine | Algiers |
| 22:00 | | Soccerway; LFP | | Stadium: Stade du 5 Juillet; Referee: Youcef Taieb Bouderbal |

| 13 March 2026 Round 23 | CS Constantine | 0–0 | ES Ben Aknoun | Constantine |
| 22:00 | | Soccerway; LFP | | Stadium: Chahid Hamlaoui Stadium; Referee: Yahia Dahar |

| 17 March 2026 Round 24 | Olympique Akbou | 1–0 | CS Constantine | Béjaïa |
| 15:00 | Hitala 25' | Soccerway; LFP | | Stadium: Maghrebi Unity Stadium; Referee: Ayoub Belhachemi |

| 3 April 2026 Round 25 | CS Constantine | 0–1 | MC Oran | Constantine |
| 18:00 | | Soccerway; LFP | Bourdim 20' | Stadium: Chahid Hamlaoui Stadium; Referee: Anes Azrine |

| 10 April 2026 Round 26 | JS Kabylie | 2–2 | CS Constantine | Tizi Ouzou |
| 17:45 | Akhrib 19'; Mahious 88' | Soccerway; LFP | Rebiaï 56'; Benmoussa 90+2' | Stadium: Hocine Aït Ahmed Stadium; Referee: Akram Mechairia |

| 16 April 2026 Round 27 | CS Constantine | 2–0 | MC Alger | Constantine |
| 18:00 | Omoyele 61'; Bangoura 84' (o.g.) | Soccerway; LFP | | Stadium: Chahid Hamlaoui Stadium; Referee: Abdelali Ibrir |

| 7 May 2026 Round 28 | Paradou AC | 5–3 | CS Constantine | Belouizdad |
| 16:00 | Soukkou 18'; Ramdaoui 30', 46', 66'; Bendouma 85' | Soccerway; LFP | Omoyele 42'; L'Ghoul 87'; Benmoussa 90+3' | Stadium: 20 August 1955 Stadium; Referee: Nabil Boukhalfa |

| 19 May 2026 Round 29 | CS Constantine | 2–2 | USM Khenchela | Constantine |
| 17:45 | L'Ghoul 14', 22' | Soccerway; LFP | Driss 7'; Etouga 23' | Stadium: Chahid Hamlaoui Stadium; Referee: Ayoub Belhachemi |

| 5 June 2026 Round 30 | JS Saoura | 3–1 | CS Constantine | Béchar |
| 20:00 | Saadi 14', 23', 58' | Soccerway; LFP | Omoyele 45' | Stadium: 20 August 1955 Stadium; Referee: Hichem Benokba |

=== Algerian Cup ===
| 5 December 2025 Round of 64 | CS Constantine | 4–1 (a.e.t.) | JS El Biar | Constantine |
| 16:00 | Benchaira 45+2'; Bensayah 93', 113'; Grine 117' | Report | Bensahaila 47' | Stadium: Chahid Hamlaoui Stadium; Referee: Youcef Tayeb Bouderbal |

| 11 December 2025 Round of 32 | CS Constantine | 3–0 | CR Témouchent | Constantine |
| 17:00 | Dib 20'; Tahar 22'; Mouaki 56' | Report | | Stadium: Chahid Hamlaoui Stadium; Referee: Rafik Aouina |

| 16 January 2026 Round of 16 | CS Constantine | 2–1 (a.e.t.) | ES Sétif | Constantine |
| 16:00 | Dib 45+7'; Bouzekri 111' | Report | Hamidi 19' | Stadium: Chahid Hamlaoui Stadium; Referee: Fateh Harkat |

| 3 March 2026 Quarter-finals | CS Constantine | 1–0 | JSM Béjaïa | Constantine |
| 22:00 | Benchaira 90+11' | Report | | Stadium: Chahid Hamlaoui Stadium; Referee: Rafik Aouina; VAR: Alaa Bouab |

| 24 April 2026 Semi-finals | CS Constantine | 2–3 | CR Belouizdad | Constantine |
| 21:00 | Dib 55'; Omoyele 90+7' | Report | Belhocini 17'; Ndiaye 58' (o.g.); Ben Hammouda 70' | Stadium: Chahid Hamlaoui Stadium; Referee: Alaa Bouab; VAR: Yahia Dahar |

== Squad information ==
=== Appearances and goals ===
As of 5 June 2026

| No. | Pos | Player | Nat | Ligue 1 | | | Algerian Cup | | | Total | | |
| No. | Pos | Player | Nat | App | St | G | App | St | G | App | St | G |
|---|---|---|---|---|---|---|---|---|---|---|---|---|
Goalkeepers
| 1 | GK | Zakaria Bouhalfaya | (Algeria) | 25 | 25 | 0 | 5 | 5 | 0 | 30 | 30 | 0 |
| 16 | GK | Mohamed Khenniche | (Algeria) | 1 | 1 | 0 | 0 | 0 | 0 | 1 | 1 | 0 |
| 23 | GK | Abdelmalek Necir | (Algeria) | 4 | 4 | 0 | 0 | 0 | 0 | 4 | 4 | 0 |
Defenders
| 2 | RB | Abderrahmane Benadla | (Algeria) | 4 | 2 | 0 | 0 | 0 | 0 | 4 | 2 | 0 |
| 4 | CB | Ahmed Aït Abdesslem | (Algeria) | 7 | 3 | 0 | 0 | 0 | 0 | 7 | 3 | 0 |
| 5 | CB | Mélo Ndiaye | (Senegal) | 26 | 24 | 0 | 4 | 2 | 0 | 30 | 26 | 0 |
| 8 | LB | Houari Baouche | (Algeria) | 24 | 21 | 0 | 3 | 3 | 0 | 27 | 24 | 0 |
| 12 | RB | Oussama Meddahi | (Algeria) | 15 | 14 | 0 | 1 | 1 | 0 | 16 | 15 | 0 |
| 13 | CB | Imadeddine Benmoussa | (Algeria) | 8 | 4 | 2 | 2 | 2 | 0 | 10 | 6 | 2 |
| 19 | CB | Chamseddine Derradji | (Algeria) | 19 | 17 | 1 | 4 | 3 | 0 | 23 | 20 | 1 |
| 25 | CB | Miloud Rebiaï | (Algeria) | 17 | 17 | 4 | 5 | 5 | 0 | 22 | 22 | 4 |
| 27 | LB | Abdelmoumen Chikhi | (Algeria) | 27 | 15 | 0 | 5 | 4 | 0 | 32 | 19 | 0 |
Midfielders
| 6 | DM | Mohamed Benchaira | (Algeria) | 26 | 21 | 2 | 5 | 4 | 2 | 31 | 25 | 4 |
| 10 | AM | Brahim Dib | (Algeria) | 22 | 20 | 4 | 4 | 3 | 3 | 26 | 23 | 7 |
| 14 | RWA | Djihad Bizimana | (Rwanda) | 12 | 8 | 0 | 2 | 2 | 0 | 14 | 10 | 0 |
| 15 | CM | Mostafa Berkane | (Algeria) | 18 | 15 | 1 | 0 | 0 | 0 | 18 | 15 | 1 |
| 18 | DM | Messala Merbah | (Algeria) | 24 | 23 | 1 | 4 | 4 | 0 | 28 | 27 | 1 |
| 30 | AM | Feth-Allah Tahar | (Algeria) | 20 | 13 | 2 | 3 | 2 | 1 | 23 | 15 | 3 |
| 32 | CM | Mounder Ayoune | (Algeria) | 1 | 0 | 0 | 1 | 0 | 0 | 2 | 0 | 0 |
Forwards
| 7 | LW | Moundhir Bouzekri | (Algeria) | 13 | 6 | 0 | 3 | 1 | 1 | 16 | 7 | 1 |
| 9 | ST | Yawo Agbagno | (Togo) | 6 | 6 | 1 | 0 | 0 | 0 | 6 | 6 | 1 |
| 11 | LW | Dadi El Hocine Mouaki | (Algeria) | 21 | 14 | 3 | 4 | 4 | 1 | 25 | 18 | 4 |
| 17 | LW | Aimen Lahmeri | (Algeria) | 14 | 10 | 0 | 1 | 1 | 0 | 15 | 11 | 0 |
| 20 | ST | Ouadjih Khelfaoui | (Algeria) | 13 | 4 | 1 | 1 | 0 | 0 | 14 | 4 | 1 |
| 21 | ST | Hatem Grine | (Algeria) | 7 | 1 | 0 | 3 | 0 | 1 | 10 | 1 | 1 |
| 22 | ST | Tosin Omoyele | (Nigeria) | 16 | 9 | 4 | 4 | 3 | 1 | 20 | 12 | 5 |
| 24 | LW | Ghiles Guenaoui | (Algeria) | 12 | 3 | 0 | 2 | 1 | 0 | 14 | 4 | 0 |
| 26 | RW | Nassim L'Ghoul | (Algeria) | 26 | 20 | 6 | 5 | 2 | 0 | 31 | 22 | 6 |
Players transferred out during the season
| ~~14~~ | DM | Salifou Tapsoba | (Burkina Faso) | 0 | 0 | 0 | 0 | 0 | 0 | 0 | 0 | 0 |
| ~~17~~ | RW | Rédha Bensayah | (Algeria) | 13 | 6 | 0 | 2 | 2 | 2 | 15 | 8 | 2 |
| ~~29~~ | CB | Achraf Boudrama | (Algeria) | 11 | 5 | 0 | 3 | 1 | 0 | 14 | 6 | 0 |
| Total | | | | 30 | | 35 | 5 | | 12 | 35 | | 47 |

Last updated: 5 June 2026
Source: soccerway.com

=== Goalscorers ===
As of 5 June 2026

Includes all competitive matches.

| No. | Nat. | Player | Pos. | L1 | AC | TOTAL |
|---|---|---|---|---|---|---|
| 10 | (Algeria) | Brahim Dib | AM | 5 | 3 | 8 |
| 26 | (Algeria) | Nassim L'Ghoul | RW | 6 | 0 | 6 |
| 22 | (Nigeria) | Tosin Omoyele | ST | 4 | 1 | 5 |
| 11 | (Algeria) | Dadi El Hocine Mouaki | LW | 3 | 1 | 4 |
| 6 | (Algeria) | Mohamed Benchaira | DM | 2 | 2 | 4 |
| 25 | (Algeria) | Miloud Rebiaï | CB | 4 | 0 | 4 |
| 30 | (Algeria) | Feth-Allah Tahar | AM | 2 | 1 | 3 |
| 13 | (Algeria) | Imadeddine Benmoussa | CB | 2 | 0 | 2 |
| 20 | (Algeria) | Ouadjih Khelfaoui | ST | 1 | 0 | 1 |
| 15 | (Algeria) | Mostafa Berkane | CM | 1 | 0 | 1 |
| 21 | (Algeria) | Hatem Grine | ST | 0 | 1 | 1 |
| 7 | (Algeria) | Moundhir Bouzekri | RW | 0 | 1 | 1 |
| 19 | (Algeria) | Chamseddine Derradji | CB | 1 | 0 | 1 |
| 18 | (Algeria) | Messala Merbah | DM | 1 | 0 | 1 |
| 9 | (Togo) | Yawo Agbagno | ST | 1 | 0 | 1 |
Players transferred out during the season
| ~~17~~ | (Algeria) | Rédha Bensayah | RW | 0 | 2 | 2 |
| Own Goals | | | | 2 | 0 | 2 |
| Totals | | | | 35 | 12 | 47 |

=== Clean sheets ===
As of 5 June 2026

Includes all competitive matches.

| | | | | | Clean sheets | | |
| No. | Nat | Name | GP | GA | L1 | AC | Total |
|---|---|---|---|---|---|---|---|
| 1 | (Algeria) | Zakaria Bouhalfaya | 30 | 28 | 10 | 2 | 12 |
| 16 | (Algeria) | Mohamed Khenniche | 1 | 2 | 0 | 0 | 0 |
| 23 | (Algeria) | Abdelmalek Necir | 4 | 5 | 2 | 0 | 2 |
| | | TOTALS | | 35 | 12 | 2 | 14 |
