= 2015–16 MC Oran season =

MC Oran
2015–16 season
- Chairman: Ahmed "Baba" Belhadj
- Head coach: Jean-Michel Cavalli (until 31 October 2015); Fouad Bouali (from 6 December 2015) (until 27 April 2016); Bachir Mecheri (from 27 April 2016)
- Stadium: Stade Ahmed Zabana
- Ligue 1: 10th place
- Algerian Cup: Round of 32
- Confederation Cup: Second round
- Top goalscorer: League: Mohamed Zubya (13); All: Mohamed Zubya (13)
Home colours	Away colours

In the 2015–16 season, Mouloudia Club d'Oran competed in the Ligue 1 for the 50th season, as well as the Algerian Cup.

== Squad list ==
Players and squad numbers last updated on 15 August 2015.
Note: Flags indicate national team as has been defined under FIFA eligibility rules. Players may hold more than one non-FIFA nationality.

Squad No.	Nationality	Position	Name	Date of birth (age)	Moving from
Goalkeepers
1	(Algeria)	GK	Abderaouf Natèche	16 October 1982 (age 44)	(Algeria) CS Constantine
16	(Algeria)	GK	Hichem Makhloufi	16 August 1994 (age 32)	Youth system
18	(Algeria)	GK	Abdellah Belarbi	17 March 1983 (age 43)	(Algeria) ES Mostaganem
Defenders
5	(Algeria)	RB	Hassouna Benchaïb	30 March 1993 (age 33)	Youth system
6	(France) (Algeria)	RB	Mohamed Benyahia	30 June 1992 (age 34)	(France) Nîmes Olympique
17	(Algeria)	RB	Farid Bellabès	20 October 1985 (age 41)	(Algeria) USM Alger
20	(Algeria)	RB	Rabah Aïch	18 July 1992 (age 34)	(Algeria) AS Khroub
21	(Algeria)	RB	Abdelmalek Merbah	19 May 1985 (age 41)	(Algeria) JS Kabylie
22	(Algeria)	RB	Chafik Bourzama	5 July 1984 (age 42)	(Algeria) CRB Ain Turk
25	(Algeria)	RB	Nabil Yaâlaoui	1 May 1987 (age 39)	(Algeria) RC Relizane
28	(Algeria)	RB	Ilyès Bouhaniche	1 September 1992 (age 34)	(Spain) CD Leganés
30	(Algeria)	RB	Chemseddine Nessakh	4 January 1988 (age 38)	(Algeria) ASO Chlef
31	(Algeria)	RB	Hamza Hamdadou	13 July 1990 (age 36)	(Algeria) CA Bordj Bou Arreridj
42	(Algeria)	RB	Réda Halaïmia	28 August 1996 (age 30)	Youth system
Midfielders
4	(Algeria)	CM	Walid Hellal	1 August 1994 (age 32)	Youth system
8	(Algeria)	CM	Tayeb Berramla	6 January 1985 (age 41)	(Algeria) RC Relizane
10	(Algeria)	CM	Hacène El Okbi	17 August 1989 (age 37)	(Algeria) USM Bel-Abbès
11	(Algeria)	CM	Abdellah Bencheikh	22 March 1994 (age 32)	Youth system
12	(Algeria)	CM	Seddik Berradja	20 September 1983 (age 43)	(Algeria) MC Alger
13	(France) (Algeria)	CM	Kamel Larbi	20 February 1985 (age 41)	(France) EF Saint-Raphaël
15	(Algeria)	CM	Khaled Lemmouchia	6 December 1981 (age 44)	
70	(Algeria)	CM	Abdelhafid Benamara	1 October 1995 (age 31)	Youth system
96	(Algeria)	CM	Sofiane Chlaoua	27 July 1993 (age 33)	Youth system
Forwards
7	(Algeria)	RW	Abdesslam Moussi	14 June 1990 (age 36)	(Algeria) US Chaouia
9	(Algeria)	RW	Merouane Dahar	30 November 1992 (age 33)	(Algeria) ES Sétif
14	(Algeria)	RW	Zakaria Benchaâ	11 January 1997 (age 29)	Youth system
19	(Algeria)	RW	Walid Athmani	19 April 1992 (age 34)	(Algeria) ASM Oran
27	(Libya)	RW	Mohamed Zubya	20 March 1989 (age 37)	(Libya) Al-Ittihad Tripoli (loan return)

== Competitions ==
=== Overview ===
Competition	Record								Started round	Final position / round	First match	Last match
Competition	G	W	D	L	GF	GA	GD	Win %	Started round	Final position / round	First match	Last match
Ligue 1	30	9	13	8	40	35	+5	30.00	—N/a	10th	15 August 2015	27 May 2016
Algerian Cup	1	0	0	1	1	2	−1	0.00	Round of 64		19 December 2015	
CAF Confederation Cup	4	1	2	1	4	3	+1	25.00	Preliminary round	Second round	12 February 2016	20 April 2016
Total	35	10	15	10	45	—	28.57					

=== Ligue 1 ===
==== League table ====
Pos	Team	Pld	W	D	L	GF	GA	GD	Pts	Qualification or relegation
8	CS Constantine	30	11	9	10	26	32	−6	42	
9	USM El Harrach	30	10	11	9	28	27	+1	41	
10	MC Oran	30	9	13	8	40	35	+5	40 (Note: MC Oran ahead of NA Hussein Dey on head-to-head record: MCO–NAH 1–0, NAH–MCO 1–0.)	
11	NA Hussein Dey	30	10	10	10	31	35	−4	40	Qualification for the Arab Club Championship group stage
12	MC Alger	30	8	14	8	28	26	+2	38	Qualification for the Confederation Cup preliminary round

Updated to match(es) played on 27 May 2016. Source: DZFoot
Rules for classification: 1) points; 2) head-to-head points; 3) head-to-head goal difference; 4) goal difference; 5) total goals; 6) fairplay ranking; 7) playoff.

==== Results summary ====
Overall								Home						Away					
Pld	W	D	L	GF	GA	GD	Pts	W	D	L	GF	GA	GD	W	D	L	GF	GA	GD
30	9	13	8	40	35	+5	40	7	7	1	25	16	+9	2	6	7	15	19	−4

Last updated: 29 December 2014.
Source: Competitive matches

==== Results by round ====
Round	1	2	3	4	5	6	7	8	9	10	11	12	13	14	15	16	17	18	19	20	21	22	23	24	25	26	27	28	29	30
Ground	A	H	A	H	A	H	A	A	H	A	H	A	H	A	H	H	A	H	A	H	A	H	H	A	H	A	H	A	H	A
Result	D	L	D	L	D	D	W	L	D	D	W	L	W	W	W	L	D	L	W	D	D	W	D	D	W	L	D	L	W	D
Position	5	12	13	14	15	15	11	13	14	15	12	13	11	10	7	8	8	9	8	8	10	9	8	7	6	8	8	11	9	10

Updated to match(es) played on 6 June 2016. Source: Competitive matches
A = Away; H = Home; W = Win; D = Draw; L = Loss

==== Matches ====
Win Draw Loss

15 August 2015 Round 1	ES Sétif	1–1	MC Oran	Sétif
17:00	Benyettou 80'	Report; Live TV: None	36' Za'abia	Stadium: Stade 8 Mai 1945; Referee: Amalou, Azrine, Salaouandji

22 August 2015 Round 2	CS Constantine	2–1	MC Oran	Constantine
18:00	Aksas 25'; Bezzaz 57'	Report; Live TV: None	39' Za'abia	Stadium: Stade Mohamed Hamlaoui; Referee: Bekouassa, Bounoua, Rachedi

29 August 2015 Round 3	MC Oran	3–3	MO Béjaïa	Oran
18:00	Moussi 12', 24'; Larbi 61'	Report; Live TV: None	17' Boukria; 58' Ndoye; 73' Youcef	Stadium: Stade Ahmed Zabana; Referee: Necib, Benacer, Maghlout

15 September 2015 Round 4	USM Alger	3–2	MC Oran	Bologhine
19:00	Meftah 20' (pen.); Seguer 55'; Belaïli 80' (pen.)	Report; Live TV: None	48' Benyahia; 90+3' Za'abia	Stadium: Stade Omar Hamadi; Referee: Abid Charef, Etchiali, Gourari

19 September 2015 Round 5	MC Oran	3–3	CR Belouizdad	Oran
17:00	Moussi 11', 74'; Za'abia 81'	Report; Live TV: TV Tamazight 4 / Canal Algérie	58' (pen.) Yahia-Chérif; 72' Niati; 90+4' Aoudou	Stadium: Stade Ahmed Zabana; Referee: Aouina S., Bensaïd, Aouina F.

28 September 2015 Round 6	RC Relizane	1–1	MC Oran	Relizane
16:30	Tiaiba 39'	Report; Live TV: None	90+1' Larbi	Stadium: Stade Tahar Zoughari; Referee: Helalchi, Brahim, Doulache

2 October 2015 Round 7	MC Oran	3–2	ASM Oran	Oran
17:00	Zubya 48' (pen.); Ogbi 67'; Benyahia 84' (pen.)	Report; Live TV: beIN Sports	58' Djemaouni; 68' Bentiba	Stadium: Stade Ahmed Zabana; Referee: Boukouassa, Rachedi, Bounoua

17 October 2015 Round 8	USM Blida	2–1	MC Oran	Blida
16:00	Amiri 3' (pen.); Fekih 90+1'	Report; Live TV: None	26' (o.g.) Amiri	Stadium: Stade Frères Brakni; Referee: Benbrahem, Alaoua, Yahi

24 October 2015 Round 9	MC Oran	2–2	JS Saoura	Oran
16:00	Benyahia 32' (pen.); Moussi 48' (pen.)	Report; Live TV: Canal Algérie	45+5', 75' Djallit	Stadium: Stade Ahmed Zabana; Referee: Mial, Semsoum, Idir

30 October 2015 Round 10	USM El Harrach	1–1	MC Oran	El Harrach
15:00	Bouguèche 13'	Report; Live TV: None	35' Za'abia	Stadium: Stade 1er Novembre 1954; Referee: Aouina, Benaïssa, Chnaoua

6 November 2015 Round 11	MC Oran	2–0	DRB Tadjenanet	Oran
16:00	Za'abia 6'; Benyahia 60' (pen.)	Report; Live TV: Canal Algérie		Stadium: Stade Ahmed Zabana; Referee: Bouslimani, El Bachir, Rimouche

21 November 2015 Round 12	MC Alger	1–0	MC Oran	Bologhine
16:00	Merzougi 35'	Report; Live TV: Canal Algérie / Al Kass Sports		Stadium: Stade Omar Hamadi; Referee: Arab, Beyout, Hamlaoui

28 November 2015 Round 13	MC Oran	1–0	NA Hussein Dey	Oran
16:00	Larbi 63'	Report; Live TV: None		Stadium: Stade Ahmed Zabana; Referee: Zouaoui, Kechida, Hamiti

12 December 2015 Round 14	RC Arbaâ	2–3	MC Oran	Larbaâ
15:00	Yettou 7'; Guessan 60'	Report; Live TV: None	23', 73' Benyahia; 46' Berradja	Stadium: Stade Ismaïl Makhlouf; Referee: Necib, Benacer, Meghenout

26 December 2015 Round 15	MC Oran	2–0	JS Kabylie	Oran
16:00	Za'abia 62'; Nessakh 75'	Report; Live TV: Canal Algérie		Stadium: Stade Ahmed Zabana; Referee: Abid Charef, Boulfelfel, Tamen

15 January 2016 Round 16	MC Oran	1–2	ES Sétif	Oran
16:00	Zubya 26' (pen.)	Report; Live TV: TV Tamazight 4	15' (pen.) Arroussi	Stadium: Stade Ahmed Zabana; Referee: Houasnia, Etchiali, Tazourt

22 January 2016 Round 17	MC Oran	1–1	CS Constantine	Oran
16:00	Berramla 11'	Report; Live TV: Canal Algérie	56' Boulemdaïs	Stadium: Stade Ahmed Zabana; Referee: Helalchi, Azrine, Doulache

30 January 2016 Round 18	MO Béjaïa	1–0	MC Oran	Béjaïa
16:00	Belkacemi 16'	Report; Live TV: None		Stadium: Stade de l'Unité Maghrébine; Referee: Achouri, Boulfelfel, Benhamouda

6 February 2016 Round 19	MC Oran	2–1	USM Alger	Oran
16:00	Zubya 75'; Benyahia 77'	Report; Live TV: Canal Algérie	71' Aoudia	Stadium: Stade Ahmed Zabana; Referee: Benbrahem, Allaoua, Chemlah

12 February 2016 Round 20	CR Belouizdad	2–2	MC Oran	Belouizdad
16:00	Nekkache 54'; Rebih 90+1' (pen.)	Report; Live TV: TV Tamazight 4	Larbi 23'; Dahar 40'	Stadium: Stade 20 Août 1955; Referee: Arab, Bioud, Hamlaoui

27 February 2016 Round 21	MC Oran	1–1	RC Relizane	Oran
16:00	Benyahia 66' (pen.)	Report; Live TV: None	90' Benabderahmane	Stadium: Stade Ahmed Zabana; Attendance: 0 (close doors); Referee: Boukouassa, Benoua, Rachedi

5 March 2016 Round 22	ASM Oran	0–3	MC Oran	Oran
16:00		Report; Live TV: None	50' Zubya; 81' Benyahia; 84' Benchaâ	Stadium: Stade Ahmed Zabana; Referee: Houasnia, Zimouche, Tazrout

26 March 2016 Round 23	MC Oran	0–0	USM Blida	Oran
18:00		Report; Live TV: None		Stadium: Stade Ahmed Zabana; Attendance: 0 (close doors); Referee: Zouaoui, Damène, Haliti

2 April 2016 Round 24	JS Saoura	0–0	MC Oran	Béchar
18:00		Report; Live TV: None		Stadium: Stade 20 Août 1955; Referee: Halalchi, Doulache, Azrine

15 April 2016 Round 25	MC Oran	2–0	USM El Harrach	Oran
18:00	Dahar 77'; Larbi 80'	Report; Live TV: TV Tamazight 4		Stadium: Stade Ahmed Zabana; Referee: Mial, Idir, Semsoum

23 April 2016 Round 26	DRB Tadjenanet	2–0	MC Oran	Tadjenanet
16:00	Demane 6'; Chibane 18' (pen.)	Report; Live TV: Algérie 3		Stadium: Lahoua Smaïl Stadium; Referee: Houasnia, Brahim, Abbane

26 April 2016 Round 27	MC Oran	0–0	MC Alger	Oran
17:00		Report; Live TV: beIN Sports / TV Tamazight 4 / Canal Algérie		Stadium: Stade Ahmed Zabana; Referee: Arab, Bioud, Meghlout

13 May 2016 Round 28	NA Hussein Dey	1–0	MC Oran	Belouizdad
17:30	Ait Abdelmalek 74'	Report; Live TV: None		Stadium: Stade 20 Août 1955; Referee: Abid-Charef, Boufelfel, Saâdi

20 May 2016 Round 29	MC Oran	2–1	RC Arbaâ	Oran
17:30	Zubya 44', 49'	Report; Live TV: None	17' Bakir	Stadium: Stade Ahmed Zabana; Referee: Maâzi, Saâdi, Amri

27 May 2016 Round 30	JS Kabylie	0–0	MC Oran	Tizi Ouzou
17:30		Report; Live TV: beIN Sports, TV Tamazight 4		Stadium: Stade 1er Novembre 1954; Referee: Ibrir, Baâziz, Chellali

== Algerian Cup ==
19 December 2015 Round of 64	MC Oran	1–2	MO Béjaïa	Oran
16:00	Larbi 77' (pen.)	Report	Yaya 14', 90'	Stadium: Stade Ahmed Zabana; Referee: Boukouassa, Rachedi, Bounoua

== CAF Confederation Cup ==
=== Preliminary round ===
12 February 2016 First leg	Wallidan (The Gambia)	Walkover	(Algeria) MC Oran	Banjul
		Report

26 February 2016 Second leg	MC Oran (Algeria)	Walkover	(The Gambia) Wallidan	Oran
		Report

=== First round ===
12 March 2016 First leg	MC Oran (Algeria)	2–0	(Ivory Coast) SC Gagnoa	Oran
18:00 UTC+1	Benyahia 21', 52'	Report		Stadium: Stade Ahmed Zabana; Attendance: 20,000; Referee: Fidel Gomes (Guinea-Bissau)

19 March 2016 Second leg	SC Gagnoa (Ivory Coast)	2–2 (2–4 agg.)	(Algeria) MC Oran	Abidjan
15:30 UTC±0	Doumouya 24'; Kassi 27'	Report	4' Larbi; 75' Dahar	Stadium: Stade Robert Champroux; Referee: Abubakar Ago (Nigeria)

=== Second round ===
9 April 2016 First leg	MC Oran (Algeria)	0–0	(Morocco) Kawkab Marrakech	Oran
18:00 UTC+1		Report		Stadium: Stade Ahmed Zabana; Attendance: 25,000; Referee: Daouda Guèye (Senegal)

20 April 2016 Second leg	Kawkab Marrakech (Morocco)	1–0 (1 – 0 agg.)	(Algeria) MC Oran	Marrakech
20:00 UTC+1	El Fakih 34' (pen.)	Report		Stadium: Stade de Marrakech; Attendance: 10,000; Referee: Sékou Ahmed Touré (Guinea)

== Squad information ==
=== Playing statistics ===
No.	Pos	Nat	Player	Total		Ligue 1		Algerian Cup		Confederation Cup	
No.	Pos	Nat	Player	Apps	Goals	Apps	Goals	Apps	Goals	Apps	Goals
Goalkeepers
1	GK	(Algeria) ALG	Abderaouf Natèche	31	0	27	0	1	0	3	0
16	GK	(Algeria) ALG	Hichem Makhloufi	0	0	0	0	0	0	0	0
18	GK	(Algeria) ALG	Abdellah Belarbi	4	0	4	0	0	0	0	0
Defenders
5	DF	(Algeria) ALG	Hassouna Benchaïb	14	0	11	0	0	0	3	0
6	DF	(Algeria) ALG	Mohamed Benyahia	27	11	24	9	0	0	3	2
17	DF	(Algeria) ALG	Farid Bellabès	16	0	16	0	0	0	0	0
20	DF	(Algeria) ALG	Rabah Aïch	14	0	14	0	0	0	0	0
21	DF	(Algeria) ALG	Abdelmalek Merbah	22	0	20	0	1	0	1	0
22	DF	(Algeria) ALG	Chafik Bourzama	2	0	2	0	0	0	0	0
25	DF	(Algeria) ALG	Nabil Yaâlaoui	4	0	3	0	0	0	1	0
28	DF	(Algeria) ALG	Ilyès Bouhaniche	3	0	3	0	0	0	0	0
30	DF	(Algeria) ALG	Chemseddine Nessakh	19	1	17	1	0	0	2	0
31	DF	(Algeria) ALG	Hamza Hamdadou	12	0	11	0	0	0	1	0
42	DF	(Algeria) ALG	Réda Halaïmia	22	0	20	0	1	0	1	0
Midfielders
4	MF	(Algeria) ALG	Walid Hellal	6	0	6	0	0	0	0	0
8	MF	(Algeria) ALG	Tayeb Berramla	19	1	15	1	1	0	3	0
10	MF	(Algeria) ALG	Hacène El Okbi	30	1	27	1	1	0	2	0
11	MF	(Algeria) ALG	Abdellah Bencheikh	15	0	14	0	1	0	0	0
12	MF	(Algeria) ALG	Seddik Berradja	25	1	23	1	1	0	1	0
13	MF	(Algeria) ALG	Kamel Larbi	26	7	22	5	1	1	3	1
15	MF	(Algeria) ALG	Khaled Lemmouchia	24	0	20	0	1	0	3	0
70	MF	(Algeria) ALG	Abdelhafid Benamara	25	0	21	0	1	0	3	0
96	MF	(Algeria) ALG	Sofiane Chlaoua	19	0	15	0	1	0	3	0
Forwards
7	FW	(Algeria) ALG	Abdesslam Moussi	22	5	19	5	1	0	2	0
9	FW	(Algeria) ALG	Merouane Dahar	11	3	8	2	0	0	3	1
14	FW	(Algeria) ALG	Zakaria Benchaâ	13	1	13	1	0	0	0	0
19	FW	(Algeria) ALG	Walid Athmani	11	0	10	0	1	0	0	0
27	FW	(Libya) LBA	Mohamed Zubya	21	13	19	13	1	0	1	0
	FW	(Algeria) ALG	Abdelkader Doukhi	1	0	1	0	0	0	0	0
Players transferred out during the season
	FW	(Algeria) ALG	Hamza Demane	5	0	5	0	0	0	0	0

Last updated: 12 June 2018
Source: fr.soccerway.com

=== Goalscorers ===
Includes all competitive matches. The list is sorted alphabetically by surname when total goals are equal.

No.	Nat.	Player	Pos.	L 1	AC	CC 3	TOTAL
27	(Libya)	Mohamed Zubya	FW	13	0	0	13
6	(Algeria)	Mohamed Benyahia	DF	9	0	2	11
13	(Algeria)	Kamel Larbi	MF	5	1	1	7
7	(Algeria)	Abdesslam Moussi	FW	5	0	0	5
9	(Algeria)	Merouane Dahar	FW	2	0	1	3
30	(Algeria)	Chemseddine Nessakh	DF	1	0	0	1
8	(Algeria)	Tayeb Berramla	MF	1	0	0	1
10	(Algeria)	Hacène El Okbi	MF	1	0	0	1
12	(Algeria)	Seddik Berradja	MF	1	0	0	1
14	(Algeria)	Zakaria Benchaâ	FW	1	0	0	1
Own Goals				1	0	0	1
Totals				40	1	4	45

== Transfers ==
=== In ===
Date	Pos	Player	From club	Transfer fee	Source
1 July 2015	DF	(Algeria) Rabah Aïch	AS Khroub	Free transfer	
18 June 2015	DF	(Algeria) Mohamed Benyahia	(France) Nîmes Olympique	Free transfer	
21 June 2015	DF	(Algeria) Ilyès Bouhaniche	(Spain) CD Leganés	Free transfer	
28 June 2015	DF	(Algeria) Hassouna Benchaïb	Reserve team	First Professional Contract	
28 June 2015	MF	(Algeria) Abdellah Bencheikh	Reserve team	First Professional Contract	
1 July 2015	MF	(The Gambia) Alieu Darbo	(Malta) Mosta	Free transfer	
1 July 2015	DF	(Algeria) Hamza Demane	US Chaouia	Free transfer	
1 July 2015	MF	(Algeria) Hacène El Okbi	USM Bel Abbès	Free transfer	
1 July 2015	FW	(Algeria) Abdeslam Moussi	US Chaouia	Free transfer	
1 July 2015	MF	(Cameroon) Cédric N'Doumbé	(France) Trélissac FC	Free transfer	
1 July 2015	DF	(Algeria) Rabah Ziad	CRB Aïn Fakroun	Free transfer	
30 July 2015	MF	(Algeria) Khaled Lemmouchia	Unattached	Free transfer	
1 January 2016	MF	(Algeria) Tayeb Berramla	RC Relizane	Free transfer	
5 January 2016	DF	(Algeria) Nabil Yaâlaoui	RC Relizane	Free transfer	
14 January 2016	FW	(Algeria) Merouane Dahar	ES Sétif	Free transfer	

=== Out ===
Date	Pos	Player	To club	Transfer fee	Source
21 June 2015	DF	(Algeria) Adel Djadane	USM Blida	Free transfer	
21 June 2015	FW	(Algeria) Mounir Fekih	USM Blida	Free transfer	
21 June 2015	FW	(Algeria) Mohamed Hicham Chérif	USM Blida	Free transfer	
25 June 2015	MF	(Algeria) Yacine Bezzaz	CS Constantine	Free transfer	
1 July 2015	MF	(Algeria) Hamza Heriat	USM Blida	Free transfer	
1 July 2015	FW	(Algeria) Hichem Nekkache	CR Belouizdad	Free transfer	
