= List of Algerian football transfers summer 2024 =

This is a list of Algerian football transfers in the 2024 summer transfer window by club. Clubs in the 2024–25 Algerian Ligue Professionnelle 1 are included. Following urgent requests from certain clubs, the Algerian Football Federation has decided to increase the number of foreign players in the Ligue 1. After having formally passed through the technical college chaired by Rabah Saâdane, the FAF ratified the increase in the number of foreigners per club from 3 to 5. However, that there is a provision intended to serve as a safeguard for the license of a foreign player or coach to be validated, the club must pay the federation a deposit equivalent to 12 months salary. This is to protect against any financial dispute.

== Ligue Professionnelle 1 ==
=== ASO Chlef ===
In: Note: Flags indicate national team as defined under FIFA eligibility rules; some limited exceptions apply. Players may hold more than one non-FIFA nationality.

No.	Pos.	Nation	Player
—	GK	ALG	Abderrahmane Medjadel (from (Algeria) MSP Batna)
—	MF	ALG	Imad Eddine Larbi (from (Algeria) GC Mascara)
—	MF	ALG	Belkacem Bourorga (from (Algeria) SKAF Khemis Miliana)
—	FW	ALG	Moussa Boukhena (from (Algeria) ES Mostaganem)

Out: Note: Flags indicate national team as defined under FIFA eligibility rules; some limited exceptions apply. Players may hold more than one non-FIFA nationality.

No.	Pos.	Nation	Player
—	MF	ALG	Juba Aguieb (to (Algeria) MC Oran)
—	FW	ALG	Yacine Aliane (to (Algeria) MC Oran)
—	MF	ALG	Toufik Addadi (to (Algeria) ES Mostaganem)
—	GK	ALG	Mohamed Alaouchiche (to (Algeria) ES Mostaganem)

=== CR Belouizdad ===
In: Note: Flags indicate national team as defined under FIFA eligibility rules; some limited exceptions apply. Players may hold more than one non-FIFA nationality.

No.	Pos.	Nation	Player
—	MF	ALG	Oussama Daibeche (from (Algeria) ES Mostaganem)
—	MF	CMR	Jacques Mbé (from (Tunisia) Étoile du Sahel)
—	GK	ALG	Farid Chaâl (from (Saudi Arabia) Al-Najma SC)
—	DF	ALG	Badreddine Souyad (from (Algeria) JS Kabylie)
—	FW	ALG	Hedy Chaabi (from (Belgium) Francs Borains)
—	MF	CIV	Arafat Doumbia (from (Ivory Coast) SO Armée)
—	GK	ALG	Moustapha Zeghba (from (Saudi Arabia) Damac FC)
—	FW	RSA	Khanyisa Mayo (from (South Africa) Cape Town City)
—	FW	ALG	Rezki Hamroune (from (Egypt) Pharco FC)
—	FW	ALG	Aymen Mahious (loan from (Switzerland) Yverdon)
—	FW	ALG	Islam Slimani (from (Belgium) Mechelen)

Out: Note: Flags indicate national team as defined under FIFA eligibility rules; some limited exceptions apply. Players may hold more than one non-FIFA nationality.

No.	Pos.	Nation	Player
—	DF	ALG	Sofiane Bouchar (loan return to (Kuwait) Al-Arabi)
—	FW	ALG	Lounes Adjout (to (Algeria) JS Kabylie)
—	DF	ALG	Achraf Boudrama (to (Algeria) CS Constantine)
—	MF	MLI	Mamadou Samaké (to (Tanzania) Azam)
—	FW	ALG	Aymene Rahmani (to (Algeria) JS Saoura)
—	GK	ALG	Alexis Guendouz (to (Iran) Persepolis)
—	MF	ALG	Houssem Eddine Mrezigue (to (Russia) Dynamo Makhachkala)
—	FW	CMR	Leonel Wamba (to (United Arab Emirates) Al Wahda)
—	MF	ALG	Akram Bouras (to (Algeria) MC Alger)

=== CS Constantine ===
In: Note: Flags indicate national team as defined under FIFA eligibility rules; some limited exceptions apply. Players may hold more than one non-FIFA nationality.

No.	Pos.	Nation	Player
—	FW	NGA	Tosin Omoyele (from (Algeria) USM Khenchela)
—	FW	ALG	Dadi El Hocine Mouaki (from (Algeria) JS Kabylie)
—	DF	ALG	Achraf Boudrama (from (Algeria) CR Belouizdad)
—	DF	SEN	Mélo Ndiaye (from (Morocco) Youssoufia Berrechid)
—	MF	ALG	Feth-Allah Tahar (from (Algeria) MC Alger)

Out: Note: Flags indicate national team as defined under FIFA eligibility rules; some limited exceptions apply. Players may hold more than one non-FIFA nationality.

No.	Pos.	Nation	Player
—	DF	ALG	Mohamed Amine Madani (to (Algeria) JS Kabylie)
—	DF	ALG	Nasreddine Zaalani (to (Bahrain) Al-Khaldiya SC)
—	MF	ALG	Hadji Chekal Affari (to (Algeria) JS Kabylie)

=== ES Sétif ===
In: Note: Flags indicate national team as defined under FIFA eligibility rules; some limited exceptions apply. Players may hold more than one non-FIFA nationality.

No.	Pos.	Nation	Player
—	GK	ALG	Tarek Bousseder (from (Algeria) ES Ben Aknoun)
—	DF	ALG	Youcef Douar (from (Algeria) Paradou AC)
—	FW	ALG	Abdel-Touab Ali Hadji (from (Algeria) ES Mostaganem)
—	MF	ALG	Akram Djahnit (from (Algeria) USM Alger)
—	DF	ALG	Oussama Gatal (from (Algeria) JS Kabylie)
—	DF	ALG	Houari Ferhani (from (Morocco) Olympic Safi)
—	MF	NGA	Augustine Oladapo (from (Democratic Republic of the Congo) TP Mazembe)
—	FW	ALG	Abderrahmane Bacha (from (Algeria) USM Alger)
—	DF	ALG	Imadeddine Boubekeur (from (Kuwait) Al-Arabi SC)
—	MF	BEN	Rodrigue Kossi Fiogbé (from (Saudi Arabia) Al-Taraji Club)
—	FW	ALG	Mohamed Boukerma (from (Algeria) Paradou AC)

Out: Note: Flags indicate national team as defined under FIFA eligibility rules; some limited exceptions apply. Players may hold more than one non-FIFA nationality.

No.	Pos.	Nation	Player

=== ES Mostaganem ===
In: Note: Flags indicate national team as defined under FIFA eligibility rules; some limited exceptions apply. Players may hold more than one non-FIFA nationality.

No.	Pos.	Nation	Player
—	DF	ALG	Abdellah Meddah (from (Algeria) USM Khenchela)
—	DF	ALG	Adel Amaouche (from (Algeria) MC El Bayadh)
—	MF	ALG	Chakib Aoudjane (from (Algeria) ES Ben Aknoun)
—	MF	ALG	Toufik Addadi (from (Algeria) ASO Chlef)
—	GK	ALG	Mohamed Alaouchiche (from (Algeria) ASO Chlef)
—	DF	ALG	Abdelkader Tamimi (from (Algeria) MC Oran)
—	FW	ALG	Chérif Siam (from (Algeria) US Biskra)
—	FW	ALG	Nizar Tamer (from (Algeria) US Biskra)
—	FW	ALG	Hani Gasmi (from (Algeria) SKAF Khemis Miliana)
—	DF	ALG	Yacine Zeghad (from (Algeria) ES Sétif)
—	FW	ALG	Ramdane Hitala (from (Algeria) ES Sétif)
—	MF	ALG	Mustapha Zeghnoun (from (Algeria) US Biskra)
—	GK	ALG	Mohammed Reyad Lezoul (from (Algeria) MC Oran U21)
—	FW	ALG	Mohammed Fodil Belkhadem (from (Algeria) CR Belouizdad)
—	DF	ALG	Boualem Mesmoudi (from (Algeria) ES Ben Aknoun)
—	DF	ALG	Benali Benamar (from (Algeria) JS Saoura)
—	MF	ALG	Aziz Benabdi (from (Algeria) ES Ben Aknoun)
—	DF	ALG	Mohamed Amine Ezzemani (from (Morocco) MA Tétouan)
—	FW	ALG	Yasser Belaribi (from (Algeria) MC El Bayadh)

Out: Note: Flags indicate national team as defined under FIFA eligibility rules; some limited exceptions apply. Players may hold more than one non-FIFA nationality.

No.	Pos.	Nation	Player
—	MF	ALG	Oussama Daibeche (to (Algeria) CR Belouizdad)
—	FW	ALG	Abdel-Touab Ali Hadji (to (Algeria) ES Sétif)
—	FW	ALG	Moussa Boukhena (to (Algeria) ASO Chlef)

=== JS Kabylie ===
In: Note: Flags indicate national team as defined under FIFA eligibility rules; some limited exceptions apply. Players may hold more than one non-FIFA nationality.

No.	Pos.	Nation	Player
—	GK	ALG	Gaya Merbah (from (Morocco) IR Tanger)
—	DF	ALG	Mohamed Amine Madani (from (Algeria) CS Constantine)
—	FW	ALG	Aimen Abdelaziz Lahmeri (from (Algeria) JS Saoura)
—	MF	MLI	Sadio Kanouté (from (Tanzania) Simba)
—	DF	ALG	Mohamed Réda Hamidi (loan from (Algeria) Paradou AC)
—	DF	ALG	Idir Mokedem (loan from (Algeria) Paradou AC)
—	FW	ALG	Lounes Adjout (from (Algeria) CR Belouizdad)
—	MF	SEN	Babacar Sarr (Unattached)
—	MF	ALG	Hadji Chekal Affari (from (Algeria) CS Constantine)
—	FW	BFA	Djibril Ouattara (from (Morocco) RS Berkane)
—	FW	COD	Walter Bwalya (from (Oman) Al-Nahda)
—	DF	MLI	Youssouf Koné (from (Belgium) Molenbeek)
—	MF	ALG	Ryad Boudebouz (from (Saudi Arabia) Ohod Club)

Out: Note: Flags indicate national team as defined under FIFA eligibility rules; some limited exceptions apply. Players may hold more than one non-FIFA nationality.

No.	Pos.	Nation	Player
—	GK	ALG	Chamseddine Rahmani (to (Algeria) MC Oran)
—	FW	ALG	Dadi El Hocine Mouaki (to (Algeria) CS Constantine)
—	MF	ALG	Mohamed Reda Boumechra (to (Algeria) USM Khenchela)
—	DF	ALG	Badreddine Souyad (to (Algeria) CR Belouizdad)
—	GK	ALG	Fouad Zegrar (to (Algeria) MC El Bayadh)
—	MF	MLI	Mamadou Traore (Unattached)
—	MF	GAB	Essang Matouti (to (Albania) KF Vllaznia)

=== JS Saoura ===
In: Note: Flags indicate national team as defined under FIFA eligibility rules; some limited exceptions apply. Players may hold more than one non-FIFA nationality.

No.	Pos.	Nation	Player
—	FW	ALG	Kamel Belmiloud (from (Algeria) MC El Bayadh)
—	DF	ALG	Azzedine Berriah (from (Algeria) MC El Bayadh)
—	DF	ALG	Ilyes Haddouche (from (Algeria) ES Ben Aknoun)
—	MF	ALG	Yacine Medane (from (Algeria) US Biskra)
—	FW	ALG	Hamek Abbes (from (Algeria) Olympique Akbou)
—	FW	ALG	Oussama Bentaleb (from (Algeria) JS Ghir Abadla)
—	FW	ALG	Aymene Rahmani (from (Algeria) CR Belouizdad)
—	MF	ALG	Abdelkader Boutiche (from (Algeria) ES Ben Aknoun)

Out: Note: Flags indicate national team as defined under FIFA eligibility rules; some limited exceptions apply. Players may hold more than one non-FIFA nationality.

No.	Pos.	Nation	Player
—	FW	ALG	Aimen Abdelaziz Lahmeri (to (Algeria) JS Kabylie)
—	GK	ALG	Aymen Mouyet (Unattached)
—	DF	ALG	Amine Benmiloud (Unattached)
—	FW	ALG	Abdelhak Abdelhafid (Unattached)
—	FW	ALG	Cheikh Amieur (Unattached)
—	DF	ALG	Benali Benamar (to (Algeria) ES Mostaganem)
—	MF	ALG	Ilyes Atallah (Unattached)
—	FW	ALG	Mohamed Amine Ouis (Unattached)
—	MF	ALG	Abdeljalil Saâd (Unattached)
—	DF	ALG	Marwane Khelif (to (Algeria) MC Alger)

=== MC Alger ===
In: Note: Flags indicate national team as defined under FIFA eligibility rules; some limited exceptions apply. Players may hold more than one non-FIFA nationality.

No.	Pos.	Nation	Player
—	MF	ALG	Zakaria Draoui (from (Morocco) Wydad AC)
—	GK	ALG	Toufik Moussaoui (from (Algeria) Paradou AC)
—	FW	CIV	Kipre Junior (from (Tanzania) Azam)
—	DF	CIV	Serge Badjo (from (Ivory Coast) FC d'Abobo)
—	DF	ALG	Marwane Khelif (from (Algeria) JS Saoura)
—	FW	ALG	Tayeb Meziani (from (Tunisia) Club Africain)
—	FW	ALG	Amine Messoussa (from (France) Lille)
—	MF	ALG	Akram Bouras (to (Algeria) CR Belouizdad)
—	FW	ALG	Andy Delort (to (Qatar) Umm Salal SC)

Out: Note: Flags indicate national team as defined under FIFA eligibility rules; some limited exceptions apply. Players may hold more than one non-FIFA nationality.

No.	Pos.	Nation	Player
—	FW	ALG	Youcef Belaïli (to (Tunisia) Espérance de Tunis)
—	MF	ALG	Djamel Benlamri (to (Iraq) Al-Shorta SC)
—	GK	ALG	Oussama Litim (to (Algeria) USM Khenchela)
—	MF	ALG	Abdelmalek Kelaleche (loan to (Tunisia) Club Africain)

=== MC El Bayadh ===
In: Note: Flags indicate national team as defined under FIFA eligibility rules; some limited exceptions apply. Players may hold more than one non-FIFA nationality.

No.	Pos.	Nation	Player
—	DF	ALG	Zareddine Benabdah (from (Algeria) MSP Batna)
—	MF	ALG	Mohamed Alaeddine Belaribi (from (Algeria) SKAF Khemis Miliana)
—	GK	ALG	Abdelkadir Salhi (from (Algeria) NC Magra)
—	MF	ALG	Mounir Belhaidja (from (Algeria) CR Belouizdad)
—	MF	ALG	Ilyes Atallah (from (Algeria) JS Saoura)
—	FW	ALG	Mohamed Said Benchoucha (from (Algeria) ES Sétif)
—	GK	ALG	Fouad Zegrar (from (Algeria) JS Kabylie)
—	DF	ALG	Abdelhak Sailaa (from (Saudi Arabia) Al-Sadd FC)

Out: Note: Flags indicate national team as defined under FIFA eligibility rules; some limited exceptions apply. Players may hold more than one non-FIFA nationality.

No.	Pos.	Nation	Player
—	DF	ALG	Adel Amaouche (to (Algeria) ES Mostaganem)
—	GK	ALG	Abdelkader Morcely (to (Algeria) Paradou AC)
—	FW	ALG	Kamel Belmiloud (to (Algeria) JS Saoura)
—	DF	ALG	Azzedine Berriah (to (Algeria) JS Saoura)
—	FW	ALG	Yasser Belaribi (to (Algeria) ES Mostaganem)

=== MC Oran ===
In: Note: Flags indicate national team as defined under FIFA eligibility rules; some limited exceptions apply. Players may hold more than one non-FIFA nationality.

No.	Pos.	Nation	Player
—	GK	ALG	Chamseddine Rahmani (from (Algeria) Chamseddine Rahmani)
—	MF	ALG	Juba Aguieb (from (Algeria) ASO Chlef)
—	DF	ALG	Kelyan Guessoum (from (Bulgaria) Etar Veliko Tarnovo)
—	GK	ALG	Léonard Aggoune (from (France) FC Rouen)
—	DF	ALG	Abdelkarim Mammar (from (Sweden) Degerfors IF)
—	MF	CIV	Sery Gnoleba (from (Ivory Coast) ASEC Mimosas)
—	FW	CIV	Mohamed Sylla (from (Ivory Coast) RC Abidjan)
—	FW	ALG	Yacine Aliane (from (Algeria) ASO Chlef)
—	FW	ALG	Karim Aribi (from (Saudi Arabia) Ohod Club)
—	MF	ALG	Chahreddine Boukholda (from (Bulgaria) Etar Veliko Tarnovo)
—	DF	ALG	Yanis Hamache (from (Portugal) Arouca)
—	DF	ALG	Tarek Aggoun (from (Algeria) ES Sétif)

Out: Note: Flags indicate national team as defined under FIFA eligibility rules; some limited exceptions apply. Players may hold more than one non-FIFA nationality.

No.	Pos.	Nation	Player
—	DF	ALG	Abdelkader Tamimi (to (Algeria) ES Mostaganem)
—	MF	ALG	Juba Oukaci (to (Algeria) Olympique Akbou)
—	GK	ALG	Mohammed Reyad Lezoul (to (Algeria) ES Mostaganem)

=== Olympique Akbou ===
In: Note: Flags indicate national team as defined under FIFA eligibility rules; some limited exceptions apply. Players may hold more than one non-FIFA nationality.

No.	Pos.	Nation	Player
—	GK	ALG	Hatem Bencheikh El Fegoun (from (Algeria) CA Batna)
—	FW	ALG	Abdelhak Askar (from (Libya) Al-Bashayir SC)
—	GK	ALG	Mohamed El Amine Yacoubi (from (Algeria) MC Alger U21)
—	MF	ALG	Dhirar Bensaadallah (from (Jordan) Ma'an SC)
—	MF	ALG	Sid Ali Lamri (from (Algeria) USM Khenchela)
—	MF	ALG	Hicham Messiad (from (Algeria) Paradou AC)
—	FW	ALG	Walid Zamoum (from (Algeria) ES Sétif)
—	MF	ALG	Mohamed El Hachemi Chacha (from (Algeria) US Souf)
—	FW	ALG	Ammar Oukil (from (Algeria) MC Alger)
—	DF	ALG	Abdeldjalil Bahoussi (from (Algeria) MC El Bayadh)
—	DF	ALG	Tarek Adouane (from (Algeria) US Biskra)
—	MF	ALG	Juba Oukaci (from (Algeria) MC Oran)
—	FW	ALG	Mohamed Hamadouche (from (Algeria) USM Bel Abbès)
—	DF	ALG	Ali Haroun (from (Algeria) ES Ben Aknoun)
—	MF	ALG	Bilal Boukarroum (from (Algeria) US Biskra)

Out: Note: Flags indicate national team as defined under FIFA eligibility rules; some limited exceptions apply. Players may hold more than one non-FIFA nationality.

No.	Pos.	Nation	Player
—	FW	ALG	Hamek Abbes (to (Algeria) JS Saoura)

=== NC Magra ===
In: Note: Flags indicate national team as defined under FIFA eligibility rules; some limited exceptions apply. Players may hold more than one non-FIFA nationality.

No.	Pos.	Nation	Player
—	MF	ALG	Adil Djabout (from (Saudi Arabia) Al-Entesar Club)
—	FW	ALG	Louey Berrahal (from (Algeria) CS Constantine U21)
—	FW	ALG	Akram Demane (from (Algeria) ES Mostaganem)
—	DF	ALG	Faik Amrane (from (Algeria) JS Kabylie)
—	DF	ALG	Abdeldjalil Mancer (from (Qatar) Al Bidda SC)
—	MF	ALG	Adem Aichouche (from (Algeria) ES Sétif U21)
—	GK	ALG	Imad Benchlef (from (Algeria) ES Sétif)
—	DF	ALG	Zakaria Zaitri (Unattached)
—	MF	ALG	Khathir Baaziz (from (Algeria) JS Saoura)
—	FW	ALG	Mohamed Amine Semahi (from (Algeria) USM Khenchela)
—	FW	ALG	Ishak Salaheddine Harrari (from (Algeria) CS Constantine)
—	FW	ALG	Massinissa Ould Taleb (from (Algeria) JS Kabylie U21)
—	FW	ALG	Badis Khadiche (from (Algeria) JSM Skikda)

Out: Note: Flags indicate national team as defined under FIFA eligibility rules; some limited exceptions apply. Players may hold more than one non-FIFA nationality.

No.	Pos.	Nation	Player
—	FW	ALG	Mohamed Kosaï Djeïdjaâ (to (Algeria) Paradou AC)
—	FW	ALG	Laid Saidi (to (Algeria) US Biskra)
—	FW	ALG	Bouzid Dadache (to (Algeria) US Biskra)

=== Paradou AC ===
In: Note: Flags indicate national team as defined under FIFA eligibility rules; some limited exceptions apply. Players may hold more than one non-FIFA nationality.

No.	Pos.	Nation	Player
—	GK	ALG	Abdelkader Morcely (from (Algeria) MC El Bayadh)
—	MF	ALG	Nassim Yattou (Unattached)
—	FW	ALG	Mohamed Kosaï Djeïdjaâ (from (Algeria) NC Magra)
—	DF	LBY	Tahir Bin Amir (from (Libya) Al-Ahly SC)
—	DF	ALG	Hamza Salem (from (Algeria) US Biskra)

Out: Note: Flags indicate national team as defined under FIFA eligibility rules; some limited exceptions apply. Players may hold more than one non-FIFA nationality.

No.	Pos.	Nation	Player
—	DF	ALG	Hocine Dehiri (to (Algeria) USM Alger)
—	MF	ALG	Yassine Titraoui (to (Belgium) Charleroi)
—	GK	ALG	Toufik Moussaoui (to (Algeria) MC Alger)
—	DF	ALG	Mohamed Réda Hamidi (loan to (Algeria) JS Kabylie)
—	MF	ALG	Idir Mokedem (loan to (Algeria) JS Kabylie)
—	FW	ALG	Mohamed Boukerma (to (Algeria) ES Sétif)

=== US Biskra ===
In: Note: Flags indicate national team as defined under FIFA eligibility rules; some limited exceptions apply. Players may hold more than one non-FIFA nationality.

No.	Pos.	Nation	Player
—	GK	ALG	Faris Boukerrit (from (Algeria) MC Oran)
—	DF	ALG	Oussama Barkat (from (Algeria) USM Alger)
—	MF	ALG	Mohamed Es Said Bourahla (from (Algeria) NC Magra)
—	MF	ALG	Belaïd Hamidi (from (Algeria) CR Belouizdad)
—	FW	ALG	Laïd Saïdi (from (Algeria) NC Magra)
—	DF	ALG	Fateh Talah (from (Algeria) ES Ben Aknoun)
—	FW	ALG	Abdeljalil Saâd (from (Algeria) JS Saoura)
—	FW	ALG	Mohamed Amine Bouziane (from (Algeria) USM Alger)
—	DF	ALG	Yacine Salhi (from (Algeria) ES Mostaganem)
—	FW	ALG	Bouzid Dadache (from (Algeria) NC Magra)

Out: Note: Flags indicate national team as defined under FIFA eligibility rules; some limited exceptions apply. Players may hold more than one non-FIFA nationality.

No.	Pos.	Nation	Player
—	FW	ALG	Chérif Siam (to (Algeria) ES Mostaganem)
—	FW	ALG	Nizar Tamer (to (Algeria) ES Mostaganem)
—	MF	ALG	Yacine Medane (to (Algeria) JS Saoura)
—	DF	ALG	Tarek Adouane (to (Algeria) Olympique Akbou)
—	MF	ALG	Mustapha Zeghnoun (to (Algeria) ES Mostaganem)
—	DF	ALG	Hamza Salem (to (Algeria) Paradou AC)

=== USM Alger ===
In: Note: Flags indicate national team as defined under FIFA eligibility rules; some limited exceptions apply. Players may hold more than one non-FIFA nationality.

No.	Pos.	Nation	Player
—	MF	ALG	Kheireddine Toual (loan return from (Algeria) ES Ben Aknoun)
—	DF	ALG	Hocine Dehiri (from (Algeria) Paradou AC)
—	DF	ALG	Ilyes Chetti (from (Morocco) Wydad AC)
—	FW	ALG	Houssam Ghacha (from (Tunisia) Espérance de Tunis)
—	MF	COD	Glody Likonza (from (Democratic Republic of the Congo) TP Mazembe)
—	DF	COD	Kévin Mondeko (from (Democratic Republic of the Congo) TP Mazembe)
—	FW	ALG	Ghiles Guenaoui (from (Egypt) Al Masry SC)
—	MF	NGA	Wale Musa Alli (from (Czech Republic) Zbrojovka Brno)
—	DF	ALG	Imadeddine Azzi (loan from (Kuwait) Kazma)
—	FW	SEN	Sekou Gassama (from (Cyprus) Anorthosis Famagusta)
—	MF	BOL	Adalid Terrazas (from (Bolivia) Always Ready)

Out: Note: Flags indicate national team as defined under FIFA eligibility rules; some limited exceptions apply. Players may hold more than one non-FIFA nationality.

No.	Pos.	Nation	Player
—	DF	ALG	Hocine Dehiri (Loan return to (Algeria) Paradou AC)
—	DF	ALG	Mustapha Bouchina (to (Algeria) RC Kouba)
—	MF	ALG	Akram Djahnit (to (Algeria) ES Sétif)
—	DF	ALG	Zineddine Belaïd (to (Belgium) Sint-Truidense)
—	DF	ALG	Abdessamed Bounacer (to (Qatar) Al Sadd SC)
—	DF	ALG	Juba Chirani (Unattached)
—	DF	ALG	Oussama Barkat (from (Algeria) US Biskra)
—	FW	ALG	Adel Belkacem Bouzida (loan return to (Algeria) Paradou AC)
—	FW	ALG	Abderrahmane Bacha (to ES Sétif)
—	FW	ALG	Mohamed Amine Bouziane (to (Algeria) US Biskra)
—	FW	CMR	Leonel Ateba (to (Tanzania) Simba)

=== USM Khenchela ===
In: Note: Flags indicate national team as defined under FIFA eligibility rules; some limited exceptions apply. Players may hold more than one non-FIFA nationality.

No.	Pos.	Nation	Player
—	FW	ALG	Prince Ibara (from (Vietnam) Hong Linh Ha Tinh)
—	GK	ALG	Oussama Litim (from (Algeria) MC Alger)
—	MF	ALG	Mohamed Reda Boumechra (from (Algeria) JS Kabylie)
—	MF	ALG	Ahmida Zenasni (from (Algeria) ASO Chlef)
—	DF	ALG	Aymen Chaaraoui (from (Algeria) US Souf)
—	MF	ALG	Mohamed Islam Bakir (from (Algeria) CR Belouizdad)
—	FW	ALG	Hamid Djaouchi (from (Saudi Arabia) Al-Qaisumah)
—	MF	ALG	Samir Aiboud (from (Saudi Arabia) Mudhar)
—	DF	ALG	Amar Khaled Nèche (from (Saudi Arabia) Al-Qaisumah)
—	DF	CIV	Moise Gbai (from (Ivory Coast) SOL FC)
—	DF	BEN	Irenée Togbedji Glele (from (Democratic Republic of the Congo) AS Vita Club)
—	DF	ALG	Ibrahim Hachoud (from (Libya) Al-Ittihad)

Out: Note: Flags indicate national team as defined under FIFA eligibility rules; some limited exceptions apply. Players may hold more than one non-FIFA nationality.

No.	Pos.	Nation	Player
—	DF	ALG	Abdellah Meddah (to (Algeria) ES Mostaganem)
—	FW	NGA	Tosin Omoyele (to (Algeria) CS Constantine)
—	MF	ALG	Sid Ali Lamri (to (Algeria) Olympique Akbou)
