= Mohamed Lamine Doumouya =

Ivorian footballer

Personal information
- Date of birth: January 9, 1995 (age 31)
- Position: Midfielder

Senior career*
Years	Team	Apps	(Gls)
2013–2014	Africa Sports		
2014	→ Ull/Kisa (loan)	4	(0)
2015	ES Bingerville		
2016	SC Gagnoa		
2016–2017	FC Shirak		
2017	Al-Ahli		
2017–2018	Stade Tunisien		
2018–2019	Najran SC		
2019	CS Hammam-Lif		
2019–2020	Maghreb de Fès		
- * Club domestic league appearances and goals

Mohamed Lamine Doumouya (born 9 January 1995) is an Ivorian football midfielder.
