= Zakaria Benchaâ =

Algerian footballer (born 1997)

Personal information
- Full name: Zakaria Benchaâ
- Date of birth: 12 June 1997 (age 29)
- Place of birth: Oran, Algeria
- Height: 1.78 m (5 ft 10 in)
- Positions: Winger; forward

Team information
- Current team: ES Sétif
- Number: 18

Youth career
- 2012–2014: MC Oran

Senior career*
Years	Team	Apps	(Gls)
2014–2018	MC Oran	19	(2)
2018–2021	USM Alger	32	(5)
2020	→ CS Sfaxien (loan)	8	(3)
2022–2023	Cherno More	20	(3)
2023–2025	CS Constantine	32	(5)
2025–2026	Al-Fahaheel SC		
2026–	ES Sétif	1	(0)

International career^{‡}
2019	Algeria	1	(0)
- * Club domestic league appearances and goals as of 3 September 2026 ‡ National team caps and goals as of 17 November 2019

Zakaria Benchaâ (Arabic: زكرياء بن شاعة; born 11 January 1997) is an Algerian professional footballer who plays as a forward for ES Sétif.

== Club career ==
=== MC Oran ===
Benchaâ is born in Oran. He started career with MC Oran in youth categories. In 2014, he joined the A team of the club.

=== USM Alger ===
On 23 March 2018 Zakaria Benchaâ joined to USM Alger for three seasons. He made his debut for the team in the Arab Club Champions Cup during a win against Al-Quwa Al-Jawiya. On August 14, He made his debut in the Ligue 1 against DRB Tadjenanet as a substitute and scored his first goal in 3–1 victory. Benchaâ suffered from injuries that kept him from glowing as he finished the season early and only played seven matches. In the following season, after getting rid of the injury, Benchaâ starred greatly in the CAF Champions League, where he scored five goals. including a brace against AS Sonidep and Gor Mahia. in transfers winter 2019–20 Benchaâ left for Tunisian club CS Sfaxien on Loan for six months with purchase option. After a long wait due to the closure of the borders, Benchaâ returned to Algeria, Antar Yahia the sporting director of USM Alger declared that Benchaâ has good capabilities and that he will train with the Reserve team, and if his mentality does not match the team he will not be in the club's squad.

=== CS Sfaxien ===
On 30 January 2020 Benchaâ joined Tunisian club CS Sfaxien on Loan for six months. After joining, he suffered an injury that kept him out of the field for months, and his first match was against CA Bizertin on 9 August 2020. His first goal was against US Ben Guerdane when Benchaâ scored a double in 4–0 victory. Due to COVID-19 pandemic, the loan was extended to 30 September until the end of the Tunisian championship, after an agreement between the two clubs. As a reminder, the two clubs had a different in this file, last August. The Tunisians had threatened to seize the Tunisian Football Federation (FTF) and FIFA for the activation of the purchase option. On 25 September 2020 Benchaâ returned to USM Alger.

=== Cherno More ===
On 17 February 2022, Benchaâ joined Bulgarian club Cherno More.

=== CS Constantine ===
In 2023, Benchaâ signed a two-year contract with CS Constantine.

=== Al-Fahaheel SC ===
In 2025, he joined Kuwaiti club Al-Fahaheel SC.

=== ES Sétif ===
On 9 July 2026, he joined ES Sétif.

== Career statistics ==
=== Club ===
As of 20 September 2020

Club	Season	League			Cup		Continental		Other		Total	
Club	Season	Division	Apps	Goals	Apps	Goals	Apps	Goals	Apps	Goals	Apps	Goals
MC Oran	2014–15	Algerian Ligue 1	6	1	0	0	—		—		6	1
MC Oran	2015–16	Algerian Ligue 1	13	1	0	0	0	0	—		13	1
Total			19	2	0	0	0	0	—		19	2
No team	2016–17	No competition										
No team	2017–18	No competition										
USM Alger	2018–19	Algerian Ligue 1	5	1	0	0	—		2 (Note: All appearance(s) in Arab Club Champions Cup)	0	7	1
USM Alger	2019–20	Algerian Ligue 1	12	1	1	0	7 (Note: All appearance(s) in CAF Champions League)	5	—		20	6
USM Alger	2020–21	Algerian Ligue 1	0	0	0	0	—		—		0	0
Total			17	2	1	0	7	5	2	0	27	7
→ CS Sfaxien (loan)	2019–20	Tunisian Ligue 1	7	3	1	0	—		1 (Note: All appearances in Tunisian Super Cup)	0	9	3
Career total			43	7	2	0	7	5	3	0	55	12

== Honours ==
=== Club ===
USM Alger

- Algerian Ligue Professionnelle 1 (1): 2018–19
