= Kamel Larbi (footballer) =

Footballer (born 1985)

Personal information
- Date of birth: 20 February 1985 (age 41)
- Place of birth: Antibes, France
- Height: 1.79 m (5 ft 10 1/2 in)
- Position: Midfielder

Youth career
- 2002–2003: OGC Nice

Senior career*
Years	Team	Apps	(Gls)
2003–2007	Nice	20	(3)
2005	→ Lorient (loan)	5	(0)
2008–2009	CS Chênois	23	(4)
2010	Moissy	7	(2)
2010–2011	Aurillac	22	(6)
2011–2013	Uzès Pont du Gard	53	(11)
2013–2014	Fréjus Saint-Raphaël	30	(5)
2014–2016	MC Oran	49	(7)
2017–2018	Cagnes-Le Cros		
2018–2020	Saint-Jean Beaulieu		
2020–	Cagnes-Le Cros	13	(5)

International career^{‡}
2006	Algeria	1	(0)
- * Club domestic league appearances and goals as of 20 January 2024 ‡ National team caps and goals as of 00:00, 5 July 2015 (EST)

Kamel Larbi (Arabic: كمال العربي) (born 20 February 1985) is a professional footballer who plays as a striker for Championnat National 3 club Cagnes-Le Cros. Born in France, he has represented Algeria at international level.

== International career ==
On 7 August 2006 Larbi was called up for the first time to the Algerian National Team by head coach Jean-Michel Cavalli for a pair of friendlies against FC Istres and Gabon. He came on as a second half substitute against Istres but did not feature against Gabon. On 15 November 2010 Larbi got his first official cap in a friendly against Burkina Faso in Aix-en-Provence, France. He started and played the whole game at right-back as Algeria lost 2–1.

In the 2013–14 season, he played in Fréjus Saint-Raphaël in the Championnat National in France. In 2014–15 season he signed with MC Oran in Algeria.
