= List of Algerian football transfers winter 2019–20 =

This is a list of Algerian football transfers in the 2019–20 winter transfer window by club. clubs in the 2019–20 Algerian Ligue Professionnelle 1 are included.

== Ligue Professionnelle 1 ==
=== AS Ain M'lila ===
In: Note: Flags indicate national team as defined under FIFA eligibility rules; some limited exceptions apply. Players may hold more than one non-FIFA nationality.

No.	Pos.	Nation	Player
—	FW	(Cameroon) CMR	Rooney Eva Wankewai (Loan from (Algeria) MC Alger)
—	FW	(Algeria) ALG	Oussama Tebbi (from (Algeria) ES Sétif)

Out: Note: Flags indicate national team as defined under FIFA eligibility rules; some limited exceptions apply. Players may hold more than one non-FIFA nationality.

No.	Pos.	Nation	Player

=== ASO Chlef ===
In: Note: Flags indicate national team as defined under FIFA eligibility rules; some limited exceptions apply. Players may hold more than one non-FIFA nationality.

No.	Pos.	Nation	Player
—	MF	(Algeria) ALG	Kaddour Beldjilali (from (Algeria) JS Saoura)
—	FW	(Ghana) GHA	Rahim Osumanu (from (Zambia) Mufulira Wanderers)
—	FW	(Algeria) ALG	Mohamed Boulaouidet (from (Sudan) Al-Hilal Club)

Out: Note: Flags indicate national team as defined under FIFA eligibility rules; some limited exceptions apply. Players may hold more than one non-FIFA nationality.

No.	Pos.	Nation	Player

=== CA Bordj Bou Arreridj ===
In: Note: Flags indicate national team as defined under FIFA eligibility rules; some limited exceptions apply. Players may hold more than one non-FIFA nationality.

No.	Pos.	Nation	Player
—	FW	(Algeria) ALG	Tawfiq Elghomari (from (Algeria) Olympique de Médéa)
—	FW	(Sudan) SDN	Abderrahmane Al Ghorbal (from (Sudan) Al-Merrikh)
—	MF	(Algeria) ALG	Abdellah Daouadji (from (Algeria) JS Saoura)

Out: Note: Flags indicate national team as defined under FIFA eligibility rules; some limited exceptions apply. Players may hold more than one non-FIFA nationality.

No.	Pos.	Nation	Player
—	FW	(Algeria) ALG	Toufik Zerara (to (Algeria) CR Belouizdad)

=== CR Belouizdad ===
In: Note: Flags indicate national team as defined under FIFA eligibility rules; some limited exceptions apply. Players may hold more than one non-FIFA nationality.

No.	Pos.	Nation	Player
—	FW	(Algeria) ALG	Mohamed Souibaâh (from (Algeria) ES Sétif)
—	FW	(Algeria) ALG	Toufik Zerara (from (Algeria) CA Bordj Bou Arreridj)

Out: Note: Flags indicate national team as defined under FIFA eligibility rules; some limited exceptions apply. Players may hold more than one non-FIFA nationality.

No.	Pos.	Nation	Player

=== CS Constantine ===
In: Note: Flags indicate national team as defined under FIFA eligibility rules; some limited exceptions apply. Players may hold more than one non-FIFA nationality.

No.	Pos.	Nation	Player
—	GK	(Algeria) ALG	Chamseddine Rahmani (from (Saudi Arabia) Damac)
—	FW	(Libya) LBY	Zakaria Alharaish (from (Morocco) Ittihad Tanger)
—	MF	(Libya) LBY	Abdallah Orfi (from (Libya) Al Ahli SC)

Out: Note: Flags indicate national team as defined under FIFA eligibility rules; some limited exceptions apply. Players may hold more than one non-FIFA nationality.

No.	Pos.	Nation	Player
—	FW	(Republic of the Congo) CGO	Dylan Bahamboula (to (Bulgaria) Tsarsko Selo)
—	FW	(Algeria) ALG	Adil Djabout (to (Algeria) US Biskra)

=== ES Sétif ===
In: Note: Flags indicate national team as defined under FIFA eligibility rules; some limited exceptions apply. Players may hold more than one non-FIFA nationality.

No.	Pos.	Nation	Player
—	DF	(Algeria) ALG	Mohamed Benyahia (Unattached)

Out: Note: Flags indicate national team as defined under FIFA eligibility rules; some limited exceptions apply. Players may hold more than one non-FIFA nationality.

No.	Pos.	Nation	Player
—	FW	(Algeria) ALG	Mohamed Souibaâh (to (Algeria) CR Belouizdad)
—	FW	(Algeria) ALG	Oussama Tebbi (to (Algeria) AS Ain M'lila)

=== JS Kabylie ===
In: Note: Flags indicate national team as defined under FIFA eligibility rules; some limited exceptions apply. Players may hold more than one non-FIFA nationality.

No.	Pos.	Nation	Player
—	FW	(Libya) LBY	Mohamed Tubal Abdussalam (from (Libya) Al-Ittihad Club)
—	FW	(Tunisia) TUN	Oussama Darragi (from (Tunisia) Club Africain)
—	FW	(Algeria) ALG	Zakaria Boulahia (from (Spain) Albacete Balompié II)

Out: Note: Flags indicate national team as defined under FIFA eligibility rules; some limited exceptions apply. Players may hold more than one non-FIFA nationality.

No.	Pos.	Nation	Player

=== JS Saoura ===
In: Note: Flags indicate national team as defined under FIFA eligibility rules; some limited exceptions apply. Players may hold more than one non-FIFA nationality.

No.	Pos.	Nation	Player

Out: Note: Flags indicate national team as defined under FIFA eligibility rules; some limited exceptions apply. Players may hold more than one non-FIFA nationality.

No.	Pos.	Nation	Player
—	MF	(Algeria) ALG	Kaddour Beldjilali (to (Algeria) ASO Chlef)
—	MF	(Algeria) ALG	Abdellah Daouadji (to (Algeria) CA Bordj Bou Arreridj)

=== MC Alger ===
In: Note: Flags indicate national team as defined under FIFA eligibility rules; some limited exceptions apply. Players may hold more than one non-FIFA nationality.

No.	Pos.	Nation	Player
—	DF	(Algeria) ALG	Abdelhak Saila (from (Algeria) MC El Eulma)

Out: Note: Flags indicate national team as defined under FIFA eligibility rules; some limited exceptions apply. Players may hold more than one non-FIFA nationality.

No.	Pos.	Nation	Player
—	DF	(Algeria) ALG	Farès Hachi (to (France) AS Lyon-Duchère)
—	DF	(Algeria) ALG	Farouk Chafaï (Loan to (Saudi Arabia) Damac FC)
—	DF	(Algeria) ALG	Ayoub Azzi (to (Qatar) Umm Salal)
—	FW	(Cameroon) CMR	Rooney Eva Wankewai (Loan to (Algeria) AS Ain M'lila)

=== MC Oran ===
In: Note: Flags indicate national team as defined under FIFA eligibility rules; some limited exceptions apply. Players may hold more than one non-FIFA nationality.

No.	Pos.	Nation	Player
—	FW	(Algeria) ALG	Nazim Itime (from (Algeria) OM Arzew)
—	FW	(Algeria) ALG	Abdelhak Abdelhafid (from (Algeria) NC Magra)
—	MF	(Algeria) ALG	Abdelkader Boutiche (from (Algeria) ASM Oran)

Out: Note: Flags indicate national team as defined under FIFA eligibility rules; some limited exceptions apply. Players may hold more than one non-FIFA nationality.

No.	Pos.	Nation	Player
—	FW	(Algeria) ALG	Mohamed Amine Hamia (to (Tunisia) CS Chebbien)

=== NA Hussein Dey ===
In: Note: Flags indicate national team as defined under FIFA eligibility rules; some limited exceptions apply. Players may hold more than one non-FIFA nationality.

No.	Pos.	Nation	Player
—	FW	(Algeria) ALG	Abdelaziz Moulay (from (Tunisia) US Tataouine)
—	FW	(Algeria) ALG	Mouayed Gritli (from (Libya) Al-Ittihad)

Out: Note: Flags indicate national team as defined under FIFA eligibility rules; some limited exceptions apply. Players may hold more than one non-FIFA nationality.

No.	Pos.	Nation	Player
—	MF	(Algeria) ALG	Ilyes Yaiche (Loan return to (Algeria) USM Alger)
—	DF	(Algeria) ALG	Mohamed Amine Tougai (to (Tunisia) Espérance de Tunis)
—	MF	(Algeria) ALG	Redouane Zerdoum (to (Tunisia) Étoile du Sahel)
—	DF	(Algeria) ALG	Naoufel Khacef (Loan to (France) Girondins de Bordeaux)

=== NC Magra ===
In: Note: Flags indicate national team as defined under FIFA eligibility rules; some limited exceptions apply. Players may hold more than one non-FIFA nationality.

No.	Pos.	Nation	Player

Out: Note: Flags indicate national team as defined under FIFA eligibility rules; some limited exceptions apply. Players may hold more than one non-FIFA nationality.

No.	Pos.	Nation	Player

=== Paradou AC ===
In: Note: Flags indicate national team as defined under FIFA eligibility rules; some limited exceptions apply. Players may hold more than one non-FIFA nationality.

No.	Pos.	Nation	Player
—	FW	(Uganda) UGA	Allan Okello (from (Uganda) KCCA)

Out: Note: Flags indicate national team as defined under FIFA eligibility rules; some limited exceptions apply. Players may hold more than one non-FIFA nationality.

No.	Pos.	Nation	Player

=== USM Alger ===
In: Note: Flags indicate national team as defined under FIFA eligibility rules; some limited exceptions apply. Players may hold more than one non-FIFA nationality.

No.	Pos.	Nation	Player
—	MF	(Algeria) ALG	Ilyes Yaiche (Loan return from (Algeria) NA Hussein Dey)

Out: Note: Flags indicate national team as defined under FIFA eligibility rules; some limited exceptions apply. Players may hold more than one non-FIFA nationality.

No.	Pos.	Nation	Player
—	FW	(Algeria) ALG	Zakaria Haddouche (Unattached)

=== US Biskra ===
In: Note: Flags indicate national team as defined under FIFA eligibility rules; some limited exceptions apply. Players may hold more than one non-FIFA nationality.

No.	Pos.	Nation	Player
—	FW	(Algeria) ALG	Adil Djabout (from (Algeria) CS Constantine)

Out: Note: Flags indicate national team as defined under FIFA eligibility rules; some limited exceptions apply. Players may hold more than one non-FIFA nationality.

No.	Pos.	Nation	Player

=== USM Bel Abbès ===
In: Note: Flags indicate national team as defined under FIFA eligibility rules; some limited exceptions apply. Players may hold more than one non-FIFA nationality.

No.	Pos.	Nation	Player

Out: Note: Flags indicate national team as defined under FIFA eligibility rules; some limited exceptions apply. Players may hold more than one non-FIFA nationality.

No.	Pos.	Nation	Player
—	FW	(Algeria) ALG	Okacha Hamzaoui (to (Iran) Tractor)
