= Messala Merbah =

Algerian footballer (born 1994)

Messala Merbah ⵎⴻⵙⴰⵍⴰ ⵎⴻⵔⴱⴰⵃ
Personal information
- Date of birth: 22 July 1994 (age 32)
- Place of birth: Tadmaït, Algeria
- Height: 1.84 m (6 ft 1/2 in)
- Position: Defensive midfielder

Team information
- Current team: JS Kabylie
- Number: 5

Youth career
- –2012: JS Tadmait

Senior career*
Years	Team	Apps	(Gls)
2012–2013	NARB Réghaïa		
2014	RC Boumerdès		
2014–2015	US Beni Douala		
2015–2019	JS Saoura	110	(2)
2020	CS Chebba	7	(0)
2020–2021	ES Sétif	26	(1)
2021–2023	USM Alger	31	(2)
2023–2026	CS Constantine	69	(2)
2026–	JS Kabylie	0	(0)

International career^{‡}
2025	Algeria A'	9	(1)
- * Club domestic league appearances and goals as of 14:15, 28 June 2026 (UTC) ‡ National team caps and goals as of 23 August 2025

Messala Merbah (Arabic: مصالة مرباح; Tamazight: ⵎⴻⵙⴰⵍⴰ ⵎⴻⵔⴱⴰⵃ; born 22 July 1994) is an Algerian professional footballer who plays as a defensive midfielder for JS Kabylie.

== Personal life ==
Messala Merbah, born in Tadmaït (Tizi Ouzou), Kabylia, is the twin brother of goalkeeper Gaya Merbah and the cousin of centre-back Abdelmalek Merbah.

== Club career ==
In 2020, Messala Merbah signed a two-year contract with ES Sétif.

In 2021, Messala Merbah signed a two-year contract with USM Alger.

In July 2023, he joined CS Constantine.

On 28 June 2026, he joined JS Kabylie, signing a three-year contract with the Kabyle club.

== Honours ==
USM Alger

- CAF Confederation Cup: 2022–23
