= Achraf Boudrama =

Algerian footballer (born 1996)

Personal information
- Date of birth: 25 May 1996 (age 30)
- Place of birth: El Eulma, Algeria
- Height: 1.92 m (6 ft 4 in)
- Position: Defender

Team information
- Current team: Al-Quwa Al-Jawiya
- Number: 19

Youth career
- ES Sétif

Senior career*
Years	Team	Apps	(Gls)
2016–2017	ES Sétif	1	(0)
2017–2018	JSM Skikda		(-)
2018–2020	MC El Eulma		(-)
2020–2022	CA Bizertin	23	(2)
2022–2023	Al-Qaisumah FC	26	(1)
2023–2024	CR Belouizdad	5	(0)
2024–2026	CS Constantine	30	(1)
2026	Al-Adalah	13	(0)
2026–	Al-Quwa Al-Jawiya	6	(1)
- * Club domestic league appearances and goals as of 5 February 2026

Achraf Boudrama (Arabic: أشرف بودرامة; born 25 May 1996) is an Algerian professional footballer who plays for Al-Quwa Al-Jawiya as a defender.

== Career ==
On 11 June 2020 he signed a two-year contract with CA Bizertin. In 2022, he joined Al-Qaisumah FC. In 2023, he joined CR Belouizdad. In 2024 he signed for CS Constantine. On 5 February 2026, he joined Saudi club Al-Adalah.
