= 2025–26 Paradou AC season =

Paradou AC
2025–26 season
- President: Hacène Zetchi
- Head coach: Billel Dziri (until 12 September 2025); Sofiène Hidoussi (from 16 September 2025) (until 27 February 2026); Azzedine Aït Djoudi (from 6 March 2026)
- Stadium: Omar Benrabah Stadium; 20 August 1955 Stadium
- Ligue 1: 14th (relegated)
- Algerian Cup: Round of 16
- Top goalscorer: League: Mohamed Ramdaoui (10 goals); All: Mohamed Ramdaoui (12 goals)
- Biggest win: Paradou AC 5–3 CS Constantine
- Biggest defeat: Paradou AC 3–0 ES CR Belouizdad
Home colours	Away colours	Third colours

The 2025–26 season, is Paradou AC's 11th season and the club's 9th consecutive season in the top flight of Algerian football. In addition to the domestic league, Paradou AC are participating in this season's editions of the Algerian Cup. The Algerian Professional Football League (LFP) officially released the calendar for the 2025–26 Ligue 1 Mobilis season on July 10, 2025. The Ligue 1 will kick off on Thursday, August 21, 2025, and conclude with the 30th and final matchday on May 16, 2026. As in recent years, league matches will be held every Thursday, Friday, and Saturday, offering better scheduling balance and improved logistical conditions for clubs and broadcasters.

== Squad list ==
Players and squad numbers last updated on 31 January 2026.
Note: Flags indicate national team as has been defined under FIFA eligibility rules. Players may hold more than one non-FIFA nationality.

No.	Nat.	Name	Position	Date of birth (age)	Signed from
Goalkeepers
16	(Algeria)	Toufik Moussaoui	GK	20 April 1991 (aged 34)	(Algeria) MC Alger
30	(Algeria)	Ahmed Abdelkader	GK	19 February 1999 (aged 26)	Unattached
60	(Algeria)	Mohammed El Koubi	GK	19 July 2007 (aged 18)	(Algeria) Reserve team
Defenders
3	(Algeria)	Mohamed Bouderka	CB	5 February 2005 (aged 20)	(Algeria) Reserve team
5	(Algeria)	Ouanisse Bouzahzah	CB	7 August 2004 (aged 21)	(Algeria) Reserve team
6	(Algeria)	Hamza Salem	CB	10 January 1998 (aged 27)	(Algeria) US Biskra
12	(Algeria)	Salaheddine Zaoui	RB	25 April 2004 (aged 21)	(Algeria) Reserve team
22	(Algeria)	Abdellah Bendouma	LB	7 October 2001 (aged 23)	(Algeria) USM Bel Abbès
23	(Algeria)	Imad Reguieg	RB	2 June 2002 (aged 23)	(Algeria) ES Sétif
24	(Algeria)	Fouad Kermiche	RB	11 July 1999 (aged 26)	(Algeria) CR Temouchent
28	(Algeria)	Yassine Ben Hamed	LB	24 March 2003 (aged 22)	Unattached
35	(Algeria)	Abdelhak Benidder	CB	10 November 2006 (aged 18)	(Algeria) Reserve team
NA	(Senegal)	Moussa Sogué	CB	23 January 2001 (aged 24)	(Senegal) US Ouakam
Midfielders
8	(Algeria)	Mohamed Abdelkader	AM	6 February 2004 (aged 21)	(Algeria) Reserve team
9	(Algeria)	Mohamed Ait El Hadj	AM	22 March 2002 (aged 23)	(Algeria) USM Alger
14	(Ivory Coast)	Abdoul Fatahou Ouattara	DM	28 August 2001 (aged 23)	(Ivory Coast) Bouaké FC
17	(Algeria)	Moncef Bisker	CM	11 January 2003 (aged 22)	(Algeria) Reserve team
18	(Algeria)	Abdeldjalil Tahri	DM	15 October 1998 (aged 26)	(Algeria) Reserve team
19	(Algeria)	Mohamed Tahar	DM	14 November 2004 (aged 20)	(Algeria) Reserve team
20	(Algeria)	Sid Ahmed Lahmer	CM	20 January 2005 (aged 20)	(Algeria) Reserve team
25	(Madagascar)	Lalaïna Rafanomezantsoa	CM	10 March 2004 (aged 21)	(Madagascar) ASSM Elgeco Plus
26	(Algeria)	Taha Yassine Tahar	DM	23 September 2000 (aged 24)	(Algeria) Reserve team
27	(Algeria)	Djafar Zabaiou	AM	23 October 2005 (aged 19)	(Algeria) Reserve team
34	(Algeria)	Salaheddine Bouziani	CM	1 January 2006 (aged 19)	(Algeria) Reserve team
Forwards
7	(Algeria)	Ben Ahmed Kohili	ST	11 July 2005 (aged 20)	(Algeria) Reserve team
11	(Algeria)	Mustapha Soukkou	RW	19 March 2003 (aged 22)	(Algeria) Reserve team
15	(Algeria)	Mohamed Ramdaoui	ST	23 July 2005 (aged 20)	(Algeria) Reserve team
29	(Algeria)	Abderrahmane Bacha	SS	21 December 1999 (aged 24)	(Algeria) USM Alger
37	(Algeria)	Mohamed Guidoum	LW	24 April 2006 (aged 19)	(Algeria) Reserve team
NA	(Madagascar)	Toky Rakotondraibe	ST	9 January 2001 (aged 24)	(Madagascar) COSFAP Antananarivo

== Transfers ==
=== In ===
==== Summer ====
Date	Pos	Player	Moving from	Fee	Source
12 August 2025	MF	(Algeria) Abdelkrim Namani	USM Alger	Free transfer	
12 August 2025	DF	(Algeria) Imad Reguieg	ES Sétif	Free transfer	
12 August 2025	DF	(Ivory Coast) Samba Koné	(Ivory Coast) AFAD Djékanou	Free transfer	
25 August 2025	GK	(Algeria) Toufik Moussaoui	MC Alger	Loan for one season	

==== Winter ====
Date	Pos	Player	Moving from	Fee	Source
31 January 2026	LB	(Algeria) Yassine Ben Hamed	Unattached	Free transfer	
31 January 2026	CB	(Senegal) Moussa Sogué	(Senegal) US Ouakam	Undisclosed	
31 January 2026	DM	(Ivory Coast) Abdoul Fatahou Ouattara	(Ivory Coast) Bouaké FC	Undisclosed	
31 January 2026	ST	(Madagascar) Toky Rakotondraibe	(Madagascar) COSFAP Antananarivo	Undisclosed	

=== Out ===
==== Summer ====
Date	Pos	Player	Moving to	Fee	Source
19 June 2025	ST	(Algeria) Adil Boulbina	(Qatar) Al-Duhail SC	3.300.000 €	
12 July 2025	MF	(Algeria) Djaber Kaâssis	CR Belouizdad	Undisclosed	
20 July 2025	DF	(Algeria) Mohamed Réda Hamidi	JS Kabylie	Undisclosed	
31 August 2025	GK	(Algeria) Mokhtar Ferrahi	MC Oran	Free transfer	

==== Winter ====
Date	Pos	Player	Moving to	Fee	Source
6 January 2026	LB	(Ivory Coast) Samba Koné	Unattached	Free transfer (Released)	
27 January 2026	RW	(Algeria) Adel Belkacem Bouzida	Unattached	Free transfer (Released)	
28 January 2026	ST	(Ivory Coast) Youssouf Dao	Unattached	Free transfer (Released)	
31 January 2026	CM	(Algeria) Abdelkrim Namani	ES Mostaganem	Free transfer	
31 January 2026	ST	(Algeria) Amayas Boudedja	ES Ben Aknoun	Free transfer	

== Competitions ==
=== Overview ===
Competition	Record								Started round	Final position / round	First match	Last match
Competition	G	W	D	L	GF	GA	GD	Win %	Started round	Final position / round	First match	Last match
Ligue 1	30	7	3	20	35	54	−19	23.33	—N/a	14th	23 August 2025	5 June 2026
Algerian Cup	3	2	1	0	8	3	+5	66.67	Round of 64	Round of 16	4 December 2025	15 January 2026
Total	33	9	4	20	43	57	−14	27.27				

Updated to match played 5 June 2026
Source: Competitions

=== Ligue 1 ===
==== League table ====
Pos	Team	Pld	W	D	L	GF	GA	GD	Pts	Qualification or relegation
12	MB Rouissat	30	9	9	12	30	35	−5	36	
13	ASO Chlef	30	9	7	14	26	31	−5	34	
14	Paradou AC (R)	30	7	3	20	35	54	−19	24	Relegation to Algerian League 2
15	ES Mostaganem (R)	30	4	7	19	18	52	−34	19	Relegation to Algerian League 2
16	MC El Bayadh (R)	30	2	11	17	17	40	−23	17	Relegation to Algerian League 2

Source: lfp.dz
Rules for classification: 1) Points; 2) Head-to-head points; 3) Head-to-head goal difference; 4) First half goal difference; 5) First half total goals; 6) Fairplay ranking; 7) Playoff.
(R) Relegated

==== Results summary ====
Overall								Home						Away					
Pld	W	D	L	GF	GA	GD	Pts	W	D	L	GF	GA	GD	W	D	L	GF	GA	GD
30	7	3	20	35	54	−19	24	5	2	8	18	23	−5	2	1	12	17	31	−14

Last updated: 5 June 2026.
Source: Competitive matches

==== Results by round ====
Round	1	2	3	4	5	6	7	8	9	10	11	12	13	14	15	16	17	18	19	20	21	22	23	24	25	26	27	28	29	30
Ground	H	A	H	A	H	A	H	A	H	H	A	H	A	H	A	A	H	A	H	A	H	A	H	A	A	H	A	H	A	H
Result	D	L	L	L	L	L	L	L	W	W	W	W	L	W	D	L	L	L	L	L	L	L	L	L	L	D	W	L	L	L
Position	10	15	15	16	16	16	16	16	15	15	14	12	14	12	12	14	14	14	14	14	14	14	14	14	14	14	14	14	14	14

Updated to match(es) played on 5 June 2026. Source: Competitive matches
A = Away; H = Home; W = Win; D = Draw; L = Loss

==== Matches ====
The league fixtures were announced on 31 July 2025.

All times are local, WAT (UTC+1).

Win Draw Loss Postponed

23 August 2025 Round 1	Paradou AC	0–0	ASO Chlef	Dar El Beïda
17:00		Soccerway; LFP		Stadium: Omar Benrabah Stadium; Referee: Mustapha Ghorbal; VAR: Ghada Mehat

30 August 2025 Round 2	CR Belouizdad	1–0	Paradou AC	Belouizdad
17:00	Belhocini 23'	Soccerway; LFP		Stadium: 20 August 1955 Stadium; Attendance: 0 (close doors); Referee: Mehdi Oukil; VAR: Ghada Mehat

6 September 2025 Round 3	Paradou AC	0–1	USM Alger	Dar El Beïda
17:00		Soccerway; LFP	Khaldi 46'	Stadium: Omar Benrabah Stadium; Referee: Fateh Harkat

12 September 2025 Round 4	ES Ben Aknoun	1–0	Paradou AC	Belouizdad
16:00	Saâd 21'	Soccerway; LFP		Stadium: 20 August 1955 Stadium; Referee: Houssam Benyahia; VAR: Alaa Bouab

19 September 2025 Round 5	Paradou AC	1–2	Olympique Akbou	Belouizdad
16:00	Ramdaoui 53'	Soccerway; LFP	Hitala 39', 45+1'	Stadium: 20 August 1955 Stadium; Referee: Tayeb Benyabka; VAR: Youcef Taieb Bouderbal

27 September 2025 Round 6	MC Oran	3–1	Paradou AC	Bir El Djir
17:45	Abdelkader 46'; Boukholda 61'; Aoudjane 64'	Soccerway; LFP	Ramdaoui 31'	Stadium: Miloud Hadefi Stadium; Referee: Yahia Dehar; VAR: Anes Azrine

3 October 2025 Round 7	Paradou AC	1–2	JS Kabylie	Belouizdad
15:30	Ramdaoui 21'	Soccerway; LFP	Boudebouz 44'; Mahious 67'	Stadium: 20 August 1955 Stadium; Referee: Akram Mechairia; VAR: Youcef Taieb Bouderbal

22 October 2025 Round 8	MC Alger	2–1	Paradou AC	Douéra
20:00	Zunon 11'; Anatouf 72'	Soccerway; LFP	Kermiche 90+2'	Stadium: Ali La Pointe Stadium; Referee: Lahlou Benbraham

26 October 2025 Round 9	Paradou AC	1–0	ES Mostaganem	Belouizdad
15:00	Abdelkader 75'	Soccerway; LFP		Stadium: 20 August 1955 Stadium; Referee: Abdelali Ibrir

3 November 2025 Round 10	Paradou AC	2–0	USM Khenchela	Belouizdad
14:30	Soukkou 11'; Abdelkader 42'	Soccerway; LFP		Stadium: 20 August 1955 Stadium; Referee: Yahia Dahar

9 November 2025 Round 11	JS Saoura	1–2	Paradou AC	Béchar
18:00	Bentaleb 55'	Soccerway; LFP	Ramdaoui 2'; Kermiche 39'	Stadium: 20 August 1955 Stadium; Referee: Ayoub Belhachemi

20 November 2025 Round 12	Paradou AC	2–0	MC El Bayadh	Belouizdad
14:00	Lahmer 25'; Ramdaoui 47'	Soccerway; LFP		Stadium: 20 August 1955 Stadium; Referee: Mehdi Oukil

19 December 2025 Round 13	CS Constantine	2–0	Paradou AC	Constantine
17:00	Mouaki 80'; Omoyele 90+4'	Soccerway; LFP		Stadium: Chahid Hamlaoui Stadium; Referee: Alaa Bouab

27 December 2025 Round 14	Paradou AC	1–0	MB Rouissat	Belouizdad
14:00	Kermiche 9'	Soccerway; LFP		Stadium: 20 August 1955 Stadium; Referee: Tahar Boudjemaa

8 January 2026 Round 15	ES Sétif	2–2	Paradou AC	Sétif
17:45	Zerrouki 9', 51'	Soccerway; LFP	Abdelkader 60'; Guidoum 84'	Stadium: 8 May 1945 Stadium; Referee: Akram Mechairia

23 January 2026 Round 16	ASO Chlef	2–0	Paradou AC	Chlef
16:00	Ledlum 29'; Bekkouche 49'	Soccerway; LFP		Stadium: Mohamed Boumezrag Stadium; Referee: Alaa Bouab

14 February 2026 Round 19	Paradou AC	3–5	ES Ben Aknoun	Belouizdad
15:00	Kermiche 11'; Abdelkader 47', 51'	Soccerway; LFP	Bouamama 40', 45+1', 79'; Saâd 43'; Djabout 90+1'	Stadium: 20 August 1955 Stadium; Referee: Lahlou Benbraham

21 February 2026 Round 20	Olympique Akbou	4–3	Paradou AC	Béjaïa
14:30	Bencherifa 19'; Bensaadallah 62'; Mehdaoui 67'; Labidi 71'	Soccerway; LFP	Kohili 10'; Soukkou 12'; Abdelkader 87'	Stadium: Maghrebi Unity Stadium; Referee: Haitham Ghouti

27 February 2026 Round 21	Paradou AC	1–2	MC Oran	Belouizdad
14:30	Tahar 79'	Soccerway; LFP	Traoré 12'; Belharrane 90+7'	Stadium: 20 August 1955 Stadium; Referee: Tahar Boudjemaa

6 March 2026 Round 22	JS Kabylie	3–2	Paradou AC	Tizi Ouzou
22:00	Mahious 7', 21', 88' (pen.)	Soccerway; LFP	Kohili 26'; Ait El Hadj 90+2'	Stadium: Hocine Aït Ahmed Stadium; Referee: Nabil Boukhalfa

13 March 2026 Round 23	Paradou AC	0–2	MC Alger	Belouizdad
15:15		Soccerway; LFP	Bangoura 28' (pen.); Naidji 38'	Stadium: 20 August 1955 Stadium; Referee: Lotfi Bekouassa

17 March 2026 Round 24	ES Mostaganem	3–2	Paradou AC	Sidi Ali
15:00	Toumi 30'; Motrani 45'; El Moudene 90+4'	Soccerway; LFP	Bendouma 8'; Kohili 72'	Stadium: Larbi Belhamiti Stadium; Referee: Fateh Harkat

1 April 2026 Round 17	Paradou AC	0–3	CR Belouizdad	Belouizdad
15:00		Soccerway; LFP	Belhocini 27'; Benzid 45+1'; Benguit 77'	Stadium: 20 August 1955 Stadium; Referee: Tayeb Benyebka

April 2026 Round 25	USM Khenchela	1–0	Paradou AC	Khenchela
16:00	Matouti 41'	Soccerway; LFP		Stadium: Amar Hamam Stadium; Referee: Alaa Bouab

11 April 2026 Round 26	Paradou AC	1–1	JS Saoura	Belouizdad
15:00	Bendouma 76'	Soccerway; LFP	Saadi 33'	Stadium: 20 August 1955 Stadium; Referee: Haitham Ghouti

17 April 2026 Round 27	MC El Bayadh	0–1	Paradou AC	El Bayadh
17:45		Soccerway; LFP	Kohili 69' (pen.)	Stadium: Zakaria Medjdoub Stadium; Referee: Mustapha Smaïl

7 May 2026 Round 28	Paradou AC	5–3	CS Constantine	Belouizdad
16:00	Soukkou 18'; Ramdaoui 30', 46', 66'; Bendouma 85'	Soccerway; LFP	Omoyele 42'; L'Ghoul 87'; Benmoussa 90+3'	Stadium: 20 August 1955 Stadium; Referee: Nabil Boukhalfa

19 May 2026 Round 29	MB Rouissat	2–1	Paradou AC	Ouargla
16:00	Benkheira 34', 43'	Soccerway; LFP	Kohili 70'	Stadium: 18 February Stadium; Referee: Hamlat Smaïl

22 May 2026 Round 18	USM Alger	4–2	Paradou AC	Algiers
18:00	Khaldi 23'; Likonza 49'; Benayad 82', 90+3'	Soccerway; LFP	Ramdaoui 44', 58'	Stadium: Stade du 5 Juillet; Referee: Lotfi Bekouassa

5 June 2026 Round 30	Paradou AC	0–2	ES Sétif	Belouizdad
17:00		Soccerway; LFP	Benlebna 2', 52'	Stadium: 20 August 1955 Stadium; Referee: Tahar Boudjemaa

=== Algerian Cup ===
4 December 2025 Round of 64	Paradou AC	3–0	CRB Adrar	Kouba
14:00	Ramdaoui 2'; Zaoui 44'; Lahmer 46'	Report		Stadium: Mohamed Benhaddad Stadium; Referee: Zouhir Mansari

11 December 2025 Round of 32	Paradou AC	2–0	USF Constantine	Kouba
14:00	Kermiche 4'; Soukkou 31'	Report		Stadium: Mohamed Benhaddad Stadium; Referee: Dhikra Houia

15 January 2026 Round of 16	CA Batna	3–3 (a.e.t.) (3–1 p)	Paradou AC	Batna
14:00	Bourada 31'; Chaibi 45+2'; Benmerzoug 99'	Report	Ramdaoui 19'; Abdelkader 23'; Guidoum 94'	Stadium: 1 November 1954 Stadium; Referee: Tayeb Benyebka
	Penalties
	Mounib Benmerzoug (penalty scored); Boughachiche (penalty scored); Kherroubi (penalty scored)		Ramdaoui (penalty missed); Badani (penalty missed); Bisker (penalty scored); Bouziani (penalty missed)

== Squad information ==
=== Appearances and goals ===
As of 5 June 2026

No.	Pos	Player	Nat	Ligue 1			Algerian Cup			Total		
No.	Pos	Player	Nat	App	St	G	App	St	G	App	St	G
Goalkeepers
16	GK	Toufik Moussaoui	(Algeria)	14	14	0	3	3	0	17	17	0
30	GK	Ahmed Abdelkader	(Algeria)	13	10	0	0	0	0	13	10	0
60	GK	Mohammed El Koubi	(Algeria)	5	5	0	0	0	0	5	5	0
70	GK	Kamel Benachour	(Algeria)	1	1	0	0	0	0	1	1	0
Defenders
3	CB	Mohamed Bouderka	(Algeria)	11	5	0	0	0	0	11	5	0
5	CB	Ouanisse Bouzahzah	(Algeria)	16	14	0	0	0	0	16	14	0
6	CB	Hamza Salem	(Algeria)	9	6	0	3	1	0	12	7	0
12	RB	Salaheddine Zaoui	(Algeria)	12	7	0	3	3	1	15	10	1
22	LB	Abdellah Bendouma	(Algeria)	15	14	3	2	2	0	17	16	3
23	RB	Imad Reguieg	(Algeria)	19	13	0	1	1	0	20	14	0
24	RB	Fouad Kermiche	(Algeria)	29	29	4	2	2	1	31	31	5
28	LB	Yassine Ben Hamed	(Algeria)	4	1	0	0	0	0	4	1	0
32	CB	Ahmed Bayoud	(Algeria)	1	1	0	0	0	0	1	1	0
33	CB	Mohamed Hamed	(Algeria)	7	4	0	0	0	0	7	1	0
35	CB	Abdelhak Benidder	(Algeria)	22	20	0	3	3	0	25	23	0
42	LB	Younes Badani	(Algeria)	1	0	0	1	0	0	2	0	0
NA	CB	Moussa Sogué	(Senegal)	0	0	0	0	0	0	0	0	0
Midfielders
8	AM	Mohamed Abdelkader	(Algeria)	24	21	6	3	3	1	27	24	7
9	AM	Mohamed Ait El Hadj	(Algeria)	29	16	1	3	3	0	32	19	1
14	DM	Abdoul Fatahou Ouattara	(Ivory Coast)	3	1	0	0	0	0	3	1	0
17	CM	Moncef Bisker	(Algeria)	18	15	0	1	0	0	19	15	0
18	DM	Abdeldjalil Tahri	(Algeria)	20	13	0	1	1	0	21	14	0
19	DM	Mohamed Tahar	(Algeria)	17	4	0	3	0	0	20	4	0
20	CM	Sid Ahmed Lahmer	(Algeria)	19	12	1	3	3	1	22	15	2
25	CM	Lalaïna Rafanomezantsoa	(Madagascar)	7	6	0	0	0	0	7	6	0
26	DM	Taha Yassine Tahar	(Algeria)	15	12	1	1	1	0	16	13	1
27	AM	Djafar Zabaiou	(Algeria)	2	0	0	3	0	0	5	0	0
34	CM	Salaheddine Bouziani	(Algeria)	20	16	0	1	0	0	21	16	0
38	DM	Malik Kahlouchi	(Algeria)	1	1	0	0	0	0	1	1	0
57	CM	Youcef Bouziane	(Algeria)	1	0	0	0	0	0	1	0	0
77	CM	Mohamed Khedir	(Algeria)	1	0	0	0	0	0	1	0	0
Forwards
7	ST	Ben Ahmed Kohili	(Algeria)	13	7	5	0	0	0	13	7	5
11	RW	Mustapha Soukkou	(Algeria)	25	25	3	2	2	1	27	27	4
15	ST	Mohamed Ramdaoui	(Algeria)	26	21	10	3	3	2	29	24	12
29	SS	Abderrahmane Bacha	(Algeria)	13	2	0	0	0	0	13	2	0
37	LW	Mohamed Guidoum	(Algeria)	6	0	1	3	0	1	9	0	2
39	ST	Aymen Chegra	(Algeria)	7	1	0	3	1	0	10	2	0
NA	ST	Toky Rakotondraibe	(Madagascar)	0	0	0	0	0	0	0	0	0
Players transferred out during the season
~~14~~	LB	Samba Koné	(Algeria)	5	5	0	0	0	0	5	5	0
~~10~~	RW	Adel Belkacem Bouzida	(Algeria)	4	0	0	0	0	0	4	0	0
~~13~~	ST	Youssouf Dao	(Ivory Coast)	9	2	0	9	2	0	0	0	0
~~13~~	GK	Amayas Boudedja	(Algeria)	0	0	0	0	0	0	0	0	0
~~28~~	CM	Abdelkrim Namani	(Algeria)	3	0	0	1	1	0	4	1	0
Total				30		35	2		5	32		40

Last updated: 5 June 2026
Source: soccerway.com

=== Goalscorers ===
As of 5 June 2026

Includes all competitive matches.

No.	Nat.	Player	Pos.	L1	AC	TOTAL
15	(Algeria)	Mohamed Ramdaoui	ST	10	2	12
8	(Algeria)	Mohamed Abdelkader	AM	6	1	7
24	(Algeria)	Fouad Kermiche	RB	4	1	5
7	(Algeria)	Ben Ahmed Kohili	ST	5	0	5
11	(Algeria)	Mustapha Soukkou	ST	3	1	4
22	(Algeria)	Abdellah Bendouma	LB	3	0	3
37	(Algeria)	Mohamed Guidoum	LW	1	1	2
20	(Algeria)	Sid Ahmed Lahmer	CM	1	1	2
12	(Algeria)	Salaheddine Zaoui	RB	0	1	1
26	(Algeria)	Taha Yassine Tahar	DM	1	0	1
9	(Algeria)	Mohamed Ait El Hadj	AM	1	0	1
Own Goals				0	0	0
Totals				35	8	43

=== Clean sheets ===
As of 5 June 2026

Includes all competitive matches.

					Clean sheets		
No.	Nat	Name	GP	GA	L 1	AC	Total
16	(Algeria)	Toufik Moussaoui	17	25	4	2	6
30	(Algeria)	Ahmed Abdelkader	13	20	1	0	1
60	(Algeria)	Mohammed El Koubi	5	10	1	0	1
70	(Algeria)	Kamel Benachour	1	2	0	0	0
Players transferred out during the season
~~1~~	(Algeria)	Amayas Boudedja	0	0	0	0	0
		TOTALS		57	6	2	8
