= 2025–26 Olympique Akbou season =

Olympique Akbou
2025–26 season
- Owner: Soummam
- President: Karim Takka
- Head coach: Lotfi Amrouche (from 15 July 2025) (until 25 January 2026); Amar Guerbi (from 30 January 2026)
- Stadium: Maghrebi Unity Stadium
- Ligue 1: 6th
- Algerian Cup: Round of 64
- Top goalscorer: League: Toufik Addadi (6 goals); All: Toufik Addadi (6 goals)
- Biggest win: Olympique Akbou 4–3 Paradou AC
- Biggest defeat: AS Khroub 2–0 Olympique Akbou
Home colours	Away colours	Third colours

The 2025–26 season, was Olympique Akbou's 2nd season in the top flight of Algerian football. In addition to the domestic league, Olympique Akbou participated in this season's editions of the Algerian Cup. The Algerian Professional Football League (LFP) officially released the calendar for the 2025–26 Ligue 1 Mobilis season on July 10, 2025.

== Squad list ==
Players and squad numbers last updated on 5 February 2026.
Note: Flags indicate national team as has been defined under FIFA eligibility rules. Players may hold more than one non-FIFA nationality.

No.	Nat.	Name	Position	Date of birth (age)	Signed from
Goalkeepers
1	(Algeria)	Ahmed Alili	GK	5 February 2005 (aged 20)	(Algeria) Paradou AC
13	(Algeria)	Rayane Yesli	GK	12 October 1999 (aged 25)	(Canada) HFX Wanderers
16	(Algeria)	Benaouda Klileche	GK	20 November 1999 (aged 25)	(Algeria) SC Mecheria
Defenders
3	(Algeria)	Nassim Mekidèche	CB	3 April 2000 (aged 25)	(Canada) HFX Wanderers
5	(Algeria)	Slimane Bouteldja	CB	30 March 1995 (aged 30)	(Algeria) AS Khroub
15	(Algeria)	Abderrahmane Sabri	CB	19 November 2005 (aged 19)	(Algeria) Reserve team
17	(Algeria)	Billal Boukaroum	RB	19 December 1993 (aged 31)	(Algeria) US Biskra
21	(Algeria)	Walid Bencherifa	LB	6 November 1988 (aged 36)	(Morocco) IR Tangier
22	(Algeria)	Ahmed Alla	LB	2 July 2005 (aged 20)	(Algeria) Reserve team
24	(Algeria)	Yasser Chelfaoui	LB	14 December 1996 (aged 28)	(Algeria) MCB Oued Sly
Midfielders
4	(Algeria)	Ali Amriche	DM	8 December 1998 (aged 26)	(Algeria) JS Kabylie
6	(Algeria)	Louanes Zidi	DM	19 September 2001 (aged 23)	(Algeria) Reserve team
8	(Algeria)	Dhirar Bensaadallah	DM	4 March 2000 (aged 25)	(Jordan) Ma'an SC
18	(Algeria)	Hicham Messiad	AM	21 April 1999 (aged 26)	(Algeria) Paradou AC
20	(Algeria)	Toufik Addadi	CM	7 October 1990 (aged 34)	(Algeria) ES Mostaganem
23	(Algeria)	Merouane Mehdaoui	CM	10 January 1998 (aged 27)	(Algeria) E Sour El Ghozlane
27	(Algeria)	Abdelmounaïm Fridhar	AM	16 March 2005 (aged 20)	(Algeria) Reserve team
29	(Mali)	Aly Desse Sissoko	DM	5 May 1998 (aged 27)	(Saudi Arabia) Al-Batin
Forwards
7	(Algeria)	Ramdane Hitala	ST	8 February 1995 (aged 30)	(Algeria) ES Mostaganem
9	(Algeria)	Mohamed Gherbi	ST	10 June 2004 (aged 21)	(Algeria) Reserve team
10	(Algeria)	Walid Zamoum	LW	10 June 1997 (aged 28)	(Algeria) ES Sétif
11	(Algeria)	Rezki Hamroune	RW	10 March 1996 (aged 29)	(Algeria) CR Belouizdad
12	(Algeria)	M'hend Sediri	RW	15 March 1996 (aged 29)	(Algeria) MC El Bayadh
14	(Algeria)	Nadjib Berrabeh	LW	13 March 1999 (aged 26)	(Algeria) USM El Harrach
25	(Algeria)	Oussama Darfalou	ST	29 September 1993 (aged 31)	Unattached
26	(Algeria)	Ghilas Belgacem	ST	10 April 2005 (aged 20)	(Algeria) CR Belouizdad
28	(Tunisia)	Hamdi Labidi	ST	9 June 2002 (aged 23)	(Iraq) Amanat Baghdad
NA	(Algeria)	Farouk Laoufi	RW	27 October 2007 (aged 17)	(Algeria) JS Saoura

== Transfers ==
=== In ===
==== Summer ====
Date	Pos	Player	Moving from	Fee	Source
21 July 2025	DF	(Algeria) Walid Bencherifa	(Morocco) IR Tangier	Free transfer	
24 July 2025	FW	(Ivory Coast) Romaric Ouattara	MC Alger	Free transfer	
31 July 2025	RB	(Algeria) Kheireddine Benamrane	MC El Bayadh	Free transfer	
4 August 2025	FW	(Algeria) Ramdane Hitala	ES Mostaganem	Free transfer	
25 August 2025	RW	(Algeria) Rezki Hamroune	CR Belouizdad	Free transfer	

==== Winter ====
Date	Pos	Player	Moving from	Fee	Source
28 December 2025	ST	(Tunisia) Hamdi Labidi	(Iraq) Amanat Baghdad	Free transfer	
31 December 2025	CB	(Algeria) Nassim Mekidèche	(Canada) HFX Wanderers	Free transfer	
8 January 2026	GK	(Algeria) Rayane Yesli	(Canada) HFX Wanderers	Free transfer	
14 January 2026	RW	(Algeria) Farouk Laoufi	JS Saoura	Free transfer	
5 February 2026	ST	(Algeria) Oussama Darfalou	Unattached	Free transfer	

=== Out ===
==== Summer ====
Date	Pos	Player	Moving to	Fee	Source
22 July 2025	DF	(Algeria) Younes Ouassa	CR Belouizdad	Free transfer	
29 July 2025	MF	(Algeria) Massinissa Benamara	MO Béjaïa	Free transfer	
1 August 2025	FW	(Algeria) Louanas Adjout	Unattached	Free transfer (Released)	
1 August 2025	CB	(Algeria) Tarek Adouane	Unattached	Free transfer (Released)	
6 August 2025	MF	(Algeria) Adel Ghanem	Unattached	Free transfer (Released)	
7 August 2025	FW	(Algeria) Abdelhak Askar	Unattached	Free transfer (Released)	

==== Winter ====
Date	Pos	Player	Moving to	Fee	Source
16 January 2026	GK	(Algeria) Hatem Bencheikh El Fegoun	ES Sétif	Loan	
20 January 2026	ST	(Ivory Coast) Romaric Ouattara	Unattached	Free transfer (Released)	
20 January 2026	CB	(Algeria) Abdeldjalil Bahoussi	Unattached	Free transfer (Released)	
30 January 2026	RB	(Algeria) Kheireddine Benamrane	Unattached	Free transfer (Released)	

== Pre-season and friendlies ==
8 August 2025 Friendly	WA Tlemcen	0–3	Olympique Akbou
: UTC+1		Report

12 August 2025 Friendly	JS Saoura	0–0	Olympique Akbou	Oran
18:00 UTC+1		Report		Stadium: Ahmed Zabana Stadium

== Competitions ==
=== Overview ===
Competition	Record								Started round	Final position / round	First match	Last match
Competition	G	W	D	L	GF	GA	GD	Win %	Started round	Final position / round	First match	Last match
Ligue 1	30	12	9	9	34	31	+3	40.00	—N/a	6th	22 August 2025	6 June 2026
Algerian Cup	1	0	0	1	0	2	−2	0.00	Round of 64	Round of 64	4 December 2025	4 December 2025
Total	31	12	9	10	34	33	+1	38.71				

Updated to match played 6 June 2026
Source: Competitions

=== Ligue 1 ===
==== League table ====
Pos	Team	Pld	W	D	L	GF	GA	GD	Pts
4	MC Oran	30	14	7	9	36	31	+5	49
5	JS Kabylie	30	11	12	7	40	31	+9	45
6	Olympique Akbou	30	12	9	9	34	31	+3	45
7	USM Khenchela	30	12	8	10	37	37	0	44
8	ES Ben Aknoun	30	11	10	9	41	39	+2	43

Source: lfp.dz
Rules for classification: 1) Points; 2) Head-to-head points; 3) Head-to-head goal difference; 4) First half goal difference; 5) First half total goals; 6) Fairplay ranking; 7) Playoff.

==== Results summary ====
Overall								Home						Away					
Pld	W	D	L	GF	GA	GD	Pts	W	D	L	GF	GA	GD	W	D	L	GF	GA	GD
30	12	9	9	34	31	+3	45	9	4	2	18	11	+7	3	5	7	16	20	−4

Last updated: 6 June 2026.
Source: Competitive matches

==== Results by round ====
Round	1	2	3	4	5	6	7	8	9	10	11	12	13	14	15	16	17	18	19	20	21	22	23	24	25	26	27	28	29	30
Ground	H	H	A	H	A	H	A	H	A	H	A	H	A	H	A	A	A	H	A	H	A	H	A	H	A	H	A	H	A	H
Result	W	W	D	L	W	D	L	W	L	W	D	W	L	D	D	L	W	D	L	W	W	W	D	W	D	W	L	L	L	D
Position	6	2	3	5	4	4	5	3	5	4	4	4	5	5	6	8	5	7	8	7	6	5	4	3	5	4	5	5	6	6

Updated to match(es) played on 6 June 2026. Source: Competitive matches
A = Away; H = Home; W = Win; D = Draw; L = Loss

==== Matches ====
The league fixtures were announced on 31 July 2025.

All times are local, WAT (UTC+1).

Win Draw Loss Postponed

22 August 2025 Round 1	Olympique Akbou	1–0	ES Mostaganem	Béjaïa
17:00	Addadi 90+13' (pen.)	Soccerway; LFP		Stadium: Maghrebi Unity Stadium; Referee: Youcef Gamouh; VAR: Haitham Ghouti

29 August 2025 Round 2	Olympique Akbou	1–0	MC Oran	Béjaïa
17:00	Mehdaoui 45+2'	Soccerway; LFP		Stadium: Maghrebi Unity Stadium; Referee: Abderahmane Sahraoui

6 September 2025 Round 3	JS Kabylie	0–0	Olympique Akbou	Tizi Ouzou
19:00		Soccerway; LFP		Stadium: Hocine Aït Ahmed Stadium; Referee: Anes Azrine; VAR: Redouane Allou

12 September 2025 Round 4	Olympique Akbou	0–1	MC Alger	Béjaïa
16:00		Soccerway; LFP	Halaïmia 8'	Stadium: Maghrebi Unity Stadium; Referee: Yahia Dehar; VAR: Fateh Harkat

19 September 2025 Round 5	Paradou AC	1–2	Olympique Akbou	Dar El Beïda
16:00	Ramdaoui 53'	Soccerway; LFP	Hitala 39', 45+1'	Stadium: Omar Benrabah Stadium; Referee: Tayeb Benyabka; VAR: Youcef Taieb Bouderbal

28 September 2025 Round 6	Olympique Akbou	1–1	USM Khenchela	Béjaïa
16:00	Zamoum 28'	Soccerway; LFP	Matouti 32'	Stadium: Maghrebi Unity Stadium; Referee: Abdelali Ibrir

4 October 2025 Round 7	JS Saoura	3–2	Olympique Akbou	Béchar
17:00	Sikiru 15', 90+2'; Boutiche 56' (pen.)	Soccerway; LFP	Gherbi 45'; Sediri 47'	Stadium: 20 August 1955 Stadium; Referee: Houssam Benyahia

17 October 2025 Round 8	Olympique Akbou	1–0	MC El Bayadh	Béjaïa
15:00	Addadi 78'	Soccerway; LFP		Stadium: Maghrebi Unity Stadium; Referee: Ala Bouab

25 October 2025 Round 9	CS Constantine	2–1	Olympique Akbou	Constantine
17:00	Tahar 11'; Dib 53'	Soccerway; LFP	Hamroune 78'	Stadium: Chahid Hamlaoui Stadium; Referee: Fateh Harkat

1 November 2025 Round 10	Olympique Akbou	2–1	MB Rouissat	Béjaïa
14:30	Chelfaoui 21'; Boukaroum 76'	Soccerway; LFP	Midoune 89'	Stadium: Maghrebi Unity Stadium; Referee: Tayeb Benyabka

8 November 2025 Round 11	ES Sétif	1–1	Olympique Akbou	Sétif
18:00	Boubekeur 47'	Soccerway; LFP	Benamrane 85'	Stadium: 8 May 1945 Stadium; Referee: Anes Azrine

21 November 2025 Round 12	Olympique Akbou	2–1	ASO Chlef	Béjaïa
14:45	Hitala 42'; Addadi 46'	Soccerway; LFP	Feddal 87'	Stadium: Maghrebi Unity Stadium; Referee: Haithem Ghouti

20 December 2025 Round 13	CR Belouizdad	3–2	Olympique Akbou	Baraki
18:00	Boussouar 11'; Ben Hammouda 89', 90+2'	Soccerway; LFP	Zamoum 8'; Gherbi 69'	Stadium: Nelson Mandela Stadium; Referee: Mehdi Oukil

27 December 2025 Round 14	Olympique Akbou	1–1	USM Alger	Béjaïa
14:00	Gherbi 69'	Soccerway; LFP	Khaldi 77'	Stadium: Maghrebi Unity Stadium; Referee: Yahia Dahar

8 January 2026 Round 15	ES Ben Aknoun	2–2	Olympique Akbou	Belouizdad
14:00	Lakehal 33'; Talah 52'	Soccerway; LFP	Gherbi 45+7'; Hitala 82'	Stadium: 20 August 1955 Stadium; Referee: Haitham Ghouti

23 January 2026 Round 16	ES Mostaganem	1–0	Olympique Akbou	Sidi Ali
15:00	Motrani 82'	Soccerway; LFP		Stadium: Larbi Belhamiti Stadium; Referee: Youcef Tayeb Bouderbal

3 February 2026 Round 17	MC Oran	0–1	Olympique Akbou	Oran
17:00		Soccerway; LFP	Sediri 82'	Stadium: Ahmed Zabana Stadium; Referee: Fateh Harkat

21 February 2026 Round 20	Olympique Akbou	4–3	Paradou AC	Béjaïa
14:30	Bencherifa 19'; Bensaadallah 62'; Mehdaoui 67'; Labidi 71'	Soccerway; LFP	Kohili 10'; Soukkou 12'; Abdelkader 87'	Stadium: Maghrebi Unity Stadium; Referee: Haitham Ghouti

28 February 2026 Round 21	USM Khenchela	0–1	Olympique Akbou	Khenchela
14:30		Soccerway; LFP	Labidi 53'	Stadium: Amar Hamam Stadium; Referee: Anes Azrine

8 March 2026 Round 22	Olympique Akbou	1–0	JS Saoura	Béjaïa
15:00	Mehdaoui 22'	Soccerway; LFP		Stadium: Maghrebi Unity Stadium; Referee: Alaa Bouab

13 March 2026 Round 23	MC El Bayadh	2–2	Olympique Akbou	El Bayadh
22:00	Barkat 40'; Kaidi 74'	Soccerway; LFP	Bensaadallah 16'; Addadi 79'	Stadium: Zakaria Medjdoub Stadium; Referee: Abdelali Ibrir

17 March 2026 Round 24	Olympique Akbou	1–0	CS Constantine	Béjaïa
15:00	Hitala 25'	Soccerway; LFP		Stadium: Maghrebi Unity Stadium; Referee: Ayoub Belhachemi

3 April 2026 Round 25	MB Rouissat	1–1	Olympique Akbou	Ouargla
16:00	Merzougui 77'	Soccerway; LFP	Hamroune 90+11'	Stadium: 18 February Stadium; Referee: Houssam Benyahia

11 April 2026 Round 26	Olympique Akbou	1–0	ES Sétif	Béjaïa
15:00	Hamroune 82'	Soccerway; LFP		Stadium: Maghrebi Unity Stadium; Referee: Tayeb Benyabka

17 April 2026 Round 27	ASO Chlef	1–0	Olympique Akbou	Chlef
17:45	Debbari 18' (pen.)	Soccerway; LFP		Stadium: Mohamed Boumezrag Stadium; Referee: Yahia Dahar

22 April 2026 Round 18	Olympique Akbou	1–1	JS Kabylie	Béjaïa
16:00	Addadi 89'	Soccerway; LFP	Bott 47'	Stadium: Maghrebi Unity Stadium; Referee: Youcef Taieb Bouderbal

28 April 2026 Round 19	MC Alger	2–1	Olympique Akbou	Douéra
20:00	Naidji 27'; Bangoura 90+5' (pen.)	Soccerway; LFP	Addadi 52'	Stadium: Ali La Pointe Stadium; Referee: Haitham Ghouti

8 May 2026 Round 28	Olympique Akbou	0–1	CR Belouizdad	Béjaïa
16:00		Soccerway; LFP	Benzid 27'	Stadium: Maghrebi Unity Stadium; Referee: Abdelali Ibrir

19 May 2026 Round 29	USM Alger	1–0	Olympique Akbou	Algiers
20:00	Bouderbala 1'	Soccerway; LFP		Stadium: Stade du 5 Juillet; Referee: Alaa Bouab

6 June 2026 Round 30	Olympique Akbou	1–1	ES Ben Aknoun	Béjaïa
17:00	Zamoum 59'	Soccerway; LFP	Saâd 77'	Stadium: Maghrebi Unity Stadium; Referee: Naïm Bouara

=== Algerian Cup ===
4 December 2025 Round of 64	AS Khroub	2–0	Olympique Akbou	El Khroub
14:00	Benbayoud 37'; Hamdaoui 82' (pen.)	Report		Stadium: Abed Hamdani Stadium; Referee: Mohamed Chaoubi

== Squad information ==
=== Appearances and goals ===
As of 6 June 2026

No.	Pos	Player	Nat	Ligue 1			Algerian Cup			Total		
No.	Pos	Player	Nat	App	St	G	App	St	G	App	St	G
Goalkeepers
1	GK	Ahmed Alili	(Algeria)	0	0	0	0	0	0	0	0	0
13	GK	Rayane Yesli	(Algeria)	12	12	0	0	0	0	12	12	0
16	GK	Benaouda Klileche	(Algeria)	12	12	0	0	0	0	12	12	0
Defenders
3	CB	Nassim Mekidèche	(Algeria)	6	6	0	0	0	0	6	6	0
5	CB	Slimane Bouteldja	(Algeria)	23	19	0	0	0	0	23	19	0
15	CB	Abderrahmane Sabri	(Algeria)	2	2	0	0	0	0	2	2	0
17	RB	Billal Boukaroum	(Algeria)	25	23	1	0	0	0	25	23	1
21	LB	Walid Bencherifa	(Algeria)	23	21	1	1	1	0	24	22	1
22	LB	Ahmed Alla	(Algeria)	1	0	0	1	1	0	2	1	0
24	LB	Yasser Chelfaoui	(Algeria)	26	25	1	0	0	0	26	25	1
47	CB	Oussama Benkou	(Algeria)	0	0	0	1	1	0	1	1	0
Midfielders
4	DM	Ali Amriche	(Algeria)	19	14	0	0	0	0	19	14	0
6	DM	Louanes Zidi	(Algeria)	22	16	0	1	0	0	23	16	0
8	DM	Dhirar Bensaadallah	(Algeria)	21	17	2	1	1	0	22	18	2
18	AM	Hicham Messiad	(Algeria)	21	7	0	1	1	0	22	8	0
20	CM	Toufik Addadi	(Algeria)	28	24	6	0	0	0	28	24	6
23	CM	Merouane Mehdaoui	(Algeria)	27	21	3	1	0	0	28	21	3
27	AM	Abdelmounaïm Fridhar	(Algeria)	1	1	0	1	1	0	2	2	0
29	DM	Aly Desse Sissoko	(Mali)	7	2	0	0	0	0	7	2	0
55	AM	Youcef Gherbi	(Algeria)	1	1	0	1	0	0	2	1	0
Forwards
7	ST	Ramdane Hitala	(Algeria)	25	18	5	0	0	0	25	18	5
9	ST	Mohamed Gherbi	(Algeria)	19	10	4	1	1	0	20	11	4
10	LW	Walid Zamoum	(Algeria)	30	25	3	0	0	0	30	25	3
11	RW	Rezki Hamroune	(Algeria)	18	8	3	0	0	0	18	8	3
12	RW	M'hend Sediri	(Algeria)	27	22	2	1	1	0	28	23	2
14	LW	Nadjib Berrabeh	(Algeria)	18	3	0	0	0	0	18	3	0
25	ST	Oussama Darfalou	(Algeria)	5	3	0	0	0	0	5	3	0
26	ST	Ghilas Belgacem	(Algeria)	16	3	0	1	1	0	17	4	0
28	ST	Hamdi Labidi	(Tunisia)	11	2	2	0	0	0	11	2	2
48	ST	Seyfeddine Bitam	(Algeria)	3	0	0	1	0	0	4	0	0
Players transferred out during the season
~~30~~	GK	Hatem Bencheikh El Fegoun	(Algeria)	6	6	0	1	1	0	7	7	0
~~2~~	CB	Abdeldjalil Bahoussi	(Algeria)	4	2	0	1	1	0	5	3	0
~~19~~	ST	Romaric Ouattara	(Ivory Coast)	4	0	0	1	0	0	5	0	0
~~25~~	RB	Kheireddine Benamrane	(Algeria)	10	6	1	0	0	0	10	6	1
Total				30		34	1		0	31		34

Last updated: 6 June 2026
Source: soccerway.com

=== Goalscorers ===
As of 6 June 2026

Includes all competitive matches.

No.	Nat.	Player	Pos.	L1	AC	TOTAL
20	(Algeria)	Toufik Addadi	CM	6	0	6
7	(Algeria)	Ramdane Hitala	ST	5	0	5
9	(Algeria)	Mohamed Gherbi	ST	4	0	4
23	(Algeria)	Merouane Mehdaoui	CM	3	0	3
11	(Algeria)	Rezki Hamroune	RW	3	0	3
10	(Algeria)	Walid Zamoum	LW	3	0	3
12	(Algeria)	M'hend Sediri	RW	2	0	2
28	(Tunisia)	Hamdi Labidi	ST	2	0	2
8	(Algeria)	Dhirar Bensaadallah	DM	2	0	2
24	(Algeria)	Yasser Chelfaoui	LB	1	0	1
17	(Algeria)	Billal Boukaroum	RB	1	0	1
21	(Algeria)	Walid Bencherifa	LB	1	0	1
Players transferred out during the season
~~25~~	(Algeria)	Kheireddine Benamrane	RB	1	0	1
Own Goals				0	0	0
Totals				34	0	34

=== Clean sheets ===
As of 6 June 2026

Includes all competitive matches.

					Clean sheets		
No.	Nat	Name	GP	GA	L1	AC	Total
1	(Algeria)	Ahmed Alili	0	0	0	0	0
13	(Algeria)	Rayane Yesli	12	11	5	0	5
16	(Algeria)	Benaouda Klileche	12	12	3	0	3
Players transferred out during the season
~~30~~	(Algeria)	Hatem Bencheikh El Fegoun	7	10	1	0	1
		TOTALS		33	9	0	9
