= 2024–25 Paradou AC season =

Paradou AC
2024–25 season
- President: Hacène Zetchi
- Head coach: Radhi Jaïdi (from 15 July 2024) (until 26 October 2024); Billel Dziri (from 28 October 2024)
- Stadium: Stade du 5 Juillet
- Ligue 1: 5th
- Algerian Cup: Round of 32
- Top goalscorer: League: Adil Boulbina (20 goals); All: Adil Boulbina (20 goals)
Home colours	Away colours	Third colours

The 2024–25 season, is Paradou AC's 10th season and the club's 8th consecutive season in the top flight of Algerian football. In addition to the domestic league, ES Sétif are participating in the Algerian Cup. On June 27, 2024 The federal office approved the calendar for the 2024–25 Ligue 1 season with the aim of ending on May 31, 2025. The first round is scheduled for September 14, this delay is motivated both by an extended end of the 2023–24 season but also by the holding of early presidential elections which will take place on September 7, 2024. However, the Ligue de Football Professionnel decided to postpone the start of the Ligue 1 by a week, on September 21.

== Squad list ==
Players and squad numbers last updated on 5 February 2025.
Note: Flags indicate national team as has been defined under FIFA eligibility rules. Players may hold more than one non-FIFA nationality.

No.	Nat.	Position	Name	Date of birth (age)	Signed from
1	(Algeria)	GK	Mohamed Hady Sahnoun	5 January 2002 (aged 22)	(Algeria) Youth system
16	(Algeria)	GK	Mokhtar Ferrahi	24 January 1996 (aged 28)	(Algeria) ES Sétif
23	(Algeria)	GK	Ahmed Abdelkader	19 February 1999 (aged 25)	Unattached
Defenders
3	(Algeria)	LB	Sabri Cheraitia	23 March 1996 (aged 28)	Unattached
5	(Algeria)	CB	Ahmed Ait Abdessalem	30 August 1997 (aged 27)	(Algeria) CR Belouizdad
6	(Algeria)	CB	Hamza Salem	10 January 1998 (aged 26)	(Algeria) US Biskra
14	(Libya)	CB	Tahir Bin Amir	16 April 2000 (aged 24)	(Libya) Al Ittihad
15	(Algeria)	LB	Chouaib Boulkaboul	3 April 2001 (aged 23)	(Algeria) Youth system
22	(Algeria)	LB	Abdellah Bendouma	7 October 2001 (aged 22)	(Algeria) USM Bel Abbès
24	(Algeria)	RB	Fouad Kermiche	11 July 1999 (aged 25)	(Algeria) CR Témouchent
37	(Algeria)	RB	Salaheddine Zaoui	25 April 2004 (aged 20)	(Algeria) Reserve team
41	(Algeria)	CB	Ouanisse Bouzahzah	7 August 2004 (aged 20)	(Algeria) Reserve team
Midfielders
8	(Algeria)	DM	Nassim Yattou	23 October 1991 (aged 33)	Unattached
9	(Algeria)	AM	Mohamed Ait El Hadj	22 March 2002 (aged 22)	(Algeria) USM Alger
17	(Algeria)	CM	Moncef Bisker	11 January 2003 (aged 22)	(Algeria) Reserve team
18	(Algeria)	DM	Abdeldjalil Tahri	15 October 1998 (aged 25)	(Algeria) Youth system
20	(Algeria)	AM	Abderrahmane Berkoun	13 March 2000 (aged 24)	(Algeria) RC Arbaâ
25	(Algeria)	AM	Islam Bouloudène	31 May 1995 (aged 29)	(Algeria) NA Hussein Dey
26	(Algeria)	DM	Taha Yassine Tahar	23 September 2000 (aged 23)	(Algeria) RC Relizane
27	(Algeria)	AM	Djaber Kaassis	3 May 1999 (aged 25)	(Algeria) Youth system
Forwards
7	(Algeria)	LW	Adil Boulbina	2 May 2003 (aged 21)	(Algeria) Youth system
10	(Algeria)	RW	Adel Belkacem Bouzida	28 February 2002 (aged 22)	(Algeria) USM Alger
11	(Algeria)	RW	Mustapha Soukkou	19 March 2003 (aged 21)	(Algeria) Reserve team
13	(Ivory Coast)	ST	Youssouf Dao	5 March 1998 (aged 26)	(Algeria) MC Alger
19	(Republic of the Congo)	ST	Christ Toulouenga	24 May 2005 (aged 19)	(Republic of the Congo) CSMD Diables Noirs
21	(Algeria)	LW	Aymen Sais	12 March 2001 (aged 23)	(Algeria) Youth system
36	(Algeria)	ST	Mohamed Ramdaoui	23 July 2005 (aged 19)	(Algeria) Reserve team
39	(Algeria)	ST	Ben Ahmed Kohili	11 July 2005 (aged 19)	(Algeria) Reserve team

== Transfers ==
=== In ===
==== Summer ====
Date	Pos	Player	Moving from	Fee	Source
13 July 2024	GK	(Algeria) Abdelkader Morcely	MC El Bayadh	Free transfer	
13 July 2024	GK	(Algeria) Nassim Yattou	Unattached (Note: Yattou free agent since his departure from ES Sétif last January.)	Free transfer	
17 July 2024	FW	(Algeria) Mohamed Kosaï Djeïdjaâ	NC Magra	Free transfer	
12 August 2024	CB	(Libya) Tahir Bin Amir	(Libya) Al-Ahly SC	Free transfer	
14 August 2024	CB	(Algeria) Hamza Salem	US Biskra	Free transfer	

==== Winter ====
Date	Pos	Player	Moving from	Fee	Source
5 February 2025	GK	(Algeria) Ahmed Abdelkader	Unattached	Free transfer	
5 February 2025	AM	(Algeria) Mohamed Ait El Hadj	(Algeria) USM Alger	Free transfer	
7 February 2025	LB	(Algeria) Sabri Cheraitia	Unattached	Free transfer	
13 February 2025	ST	(Ivory Coast) Youssouf Dao	Unattached	Free transfer	

=== Out ===
==== Summer ====
Date	Pos	Player	Moving to	Fee	Source
19 June 2024	DF	(Algeria) Hocine Dehiri	USM Alger	20,000,000 DA	
1 July 2024	CB	(Algeria) Youcef Douar	ES Sétif	Free transfer	
7 July 2024	MF	(Algeria) Yassine Titraoui	(Belgium) Charleroi	1,200,000 €	
8 July 2024	GK	(Algeria) Toufik Moussaoui	MC Alger	Free transfer	
17 July 2024	DF	(Algeria) Mohamed Réda Hamidi	JS Kabylie	Loan for one year	
17 July 2024	CB	(Algeria) Idir Mokedem	JS Kabylie	Loan for one year	

== Competitions ==
=== Overview ===
Competition	Record								Started round	Final position / round	First match	Last match
Competition	G	W	D	L	GF	GA	GD	Win %	Started round	Final position / round	First match	Last match
Ligue 1	30	11	8	11	41	39	+2	36.67	—N/a	5th	21 September 2024	21 June 2025
Algerian Cup	2	1	1	0	5	3	+2	50.00	Round of 64	Round of 32	6 January 2025	12 January 2025
Total	32	12	9	11	46	42	+4	37.50				

Updated to match played 21 June 2025
Source: Competitions

=== Ligue 1 ===
==== League table ====
Pos	Team	Pld	W	D	L	GF	GA	GD	Pts	Qualification or relegation
3	CR Belouizdad	30	15	10	5	44	21	+23	55	Qualification for Confederation Cup (Note: USMA Alger qualified for the 2025–26 CAF Confederation Cup by winning the 2024–25 Algerian Cup)
4	JS Saoura	30	12	7	11	34	36	−2	43	
5	Paradou AC	30	11	8	11	41	39	+2	41	
6	ES Sétif	30	11	8	11	21	24	−3	41	
7	USM Alger	30	10	10	10	26	26	0	40	Qualification for Confederation Cup

Source: the-sports.org
Rules for classification: 1) points; 2) head-to-head points; 3) head-to-head goal difference; 4) goal difference; 5) total goals; 6) fairplay ranking; 7) playoff.

==== Results summary ====
Overall								Home						Away					
Pld	W	D	L	GF	GA	GD	Pts	W	D	L	GF	GA	GD	W	D	L	GF	GA	GD
30	11	8	11	41	39	+2	41	7	3	5	23	18	+5	4	5	6	18	21	−3

Last updated: 21 June 2025.
Source: Competitive matches

==== Results by round ====
Round	1	2	3	4	5	6	7	8	9	10	11	12	13	14	15	16	17	18	19	20	21	22	23	24	25	26	27	28	29	30
Ground	H	A	H	H	A	H	A	H	A	H	A	H	A	H	A	A	H	A	A	H	A	H	A	H	A	H	A	H	A	H
Result	W	D	L	L	L	D	D	W	W	W	D	L	D	W	W	L	L	L	W	W	L	D	D	D	W	W	L	W	L	L
Position	2	1	9	12	15	15	14	11	7	5	6	8	9	6	5	6	8	10	7	5	6	7	8	9	6	4	4	4	5	5

Updated to match(es) played on 21 June 2025. Source: Competitive matches
A = Away; H = Home; W = Win; D = Draw; L = Loss

==== Matches ====
The league fixtures were announced on 11 July 2024.

All times are local, WAT (UTC+1).

Win Draw Loss Postponed

21 September 2024 Round 1	Paradou AC	2–0	ASO Chlef	Algiers
16:00	Boulbina 25', 61' (pen.)	Report		Stadium: 20 August 1955 Stadium; Referee: Youcef Gamouh

27 September 2024 Round 2	MC Alger	1–1	Paradou AC	Douera
16:00	Delort 67'	Report	Boulbina 62'	Stadium: Ali La Pointe Stadium; Attendance: 0 (close doors); Referee: Rafik Aouina; VAR: Anes Azrine

6 October 2024 Round 3	Paradou AC	0–3	JS Kabylie	Algiers
16:00		Report	Kanouté 20'; Boualia 79'; Hadji 90+5'	Stadium: 20 August 1955 Stadium; Referee: Said Aouina

11 October 2024 Round 4	Paradou AC	1–3	Olympique Akbou	Algiers
16:00	Ramdaoui 31'	Report	Messiad 11'; Oukil 45'; Haroun 69' (pen.)	Stadium: 20 August 1955 Stadium; Referee: Nabil Boukhalfa

19 October 2024 Round 5	CS Constantine	2–1	Paradou AC	Constantine
16:00	Temine 11'; Dib 31'	Report	Ramdaoui 4'	Stadium: Chahid Hamlaoui Stadium; Attendance: 0 (close doors); Referee: Akram Mechairia

25 October 2024 Round 6	Paradou AC	2–2	MC Oran	Algiers
19:30	Soukkou 44'; Boulbina 83'	Report	Dahar 59' (pen.); Boukholda 88'	Stadium: Stade du 5 Juillet; Referee: Tahar Boudjemaa; VAR: Rafik Aouina

2 November 2024 Round 7	MC El Bayadh	1–1	Paradou AC	El Bayadh
15:00	El Moudene 43' (pen.)	Report	Boulbina 10'	Stadium: Zakaria Medjdoub Stadium; Referee: Youcef Taieb Bouderbal

8 November 2024 Round 8	Paradou AC	4–0	USM Khenchela	Algiers
16:45	Salem 26'; Kohili 42', 68'; Boulbina 80'	Report		Stadium: Stade du 5 Juillet; Referee: Yahia Dehar; VAR: Houssam Benyahia

13 December 2024 Round 13	NC Magra	1–1	Paradou AC	Magra
15:00	Merouani 26'	Report	Boulbina 85'	Stadium: Boucheligue Brothers Stadium; Attendance: 0 (close doors); Referee: Tayeb Benyabka

17 December 2024 Round 9	ES Sétif	1–2	Paradou AC	Sétif
17:30	Bacha 62'	Report	Kohili 6'; Boulbina 70'	Stadium: 8 May 1945 Stadium; Referee: Yahia Dehar

21 December 2024 Round 14	Paradou AC	2–0	JS Saoura	Algiers
16:00	Yattou 87'; Kohili 90+1'	Report		Stadium: Stade du 5 Juillet; Referee: Alaa Bouab

26 December 2024 Round 15	ES Mostaganem	0–2	Paradou AC	Mostaganem
17:00		Report	Boulbina 9', 89'	Stadium: Mohamed Bensaïd Stadium; Referee: Mehdi Oukil

1 January 2025 Round 10	Paradou AC	2–1	US Biskra	Algiers
16:00	Ait Abdessalem 50'; Boulbina 64'	Report	Rahmoun 27'	Stadium: Stade du 5 Juillet; Referee: Akram Mechairia; VAR: Alaa Bouab

25 January 2025 Round 12	Paradou AC	1–2	CR Belouizdad	Algiers
17:00	Kaassis 87'	Report	Khacef 45+9'; Mayo 86'	Stadium: Stade du 5 Juillet; Referee: Nabil Boukhalfa; VAR: Houssam Benyahia

28 January 2025 Round 11	USM Alger	1–1	Paradou AC	Algiers
19:00	Belkacemi 54' (pen.)	Report	Boulbina 45+10' (pen.)	Stadium: Stade du 5 Juillet; Referee: Youcef Taieb Bouderbal; VAR: Redouane Allou

11 February 2025 Round 16	ASO Chlef	2–0	Paradou AC	Chlef
15:00	Ledlum 10'; Agbagno 16'	Report		Stadium: Mohamed Boumezrag Stadium; Attendance: 0 (close doors); Referee: Akram Mechairia; VAR: Redouane Allou

23 February 2025 Round 17	Paradou AC	1–3	MC Alger	Algiers
20:00	Kaassis 44'	Report	Menezla 10'; Halaïmia 38'; Bayazid 90+2'	Stadium: Stade du 5 Juillet; Referee: Mehdi Oukil

28 February 2025 Round 18	JS Kabylie	2–1	Paradou AC	Tizi Ouzou
16:45	Berkane 2'; Madani 81' (pen.)	Report	Bouzahzah 71'	Stadium: Hocine Aït Ahmed Stadium; Attendance: 0 (close doors); Referee: Mustapha Ghorbal; VAR: Rafik Aouina

6 March 2025 Round 19	Olympique Akbou	1–2	Paradou AC	Béjaïa
22:00	Haroun 90+12'	Report	Tahar 70'; Boulbina 87'	Stadium: Maghrebi Unity Stadium; Referee: Ayoub Belhachemi

14 March 2025 Round 20	Paradou AC	2–0	CS Constantine	Algiers
22:00	Boulbina 18' (pen.), 90+3'	Report		Stadium: Stade du 5 Juillet; Referee: Yahia Dehar; VAR: Youcef Taieb Bouderbal

4 April 2025 Round 21	MC Oran	2–0	Paradou AC	Oran
18:00	Dahar 20' (pen.); Motrani 66'	Report		Stadium: Ahmed Zabana Stadium; Attendance: 0 (close doors); Referee: Youcef Gamouh

11 April 2025 Round 22	Paradou AC	0–0	MC El Bayadh	Algiers
17:00		Report		Stadium: Stade du 5 Juillet; Referee: Haithem Ghouti; VAR: Anes Azrine

18 April 2025 Round 23	USM Khenchela	2–2	Paradou AC	Khenchela
16:00	Boumechra 29'; Djaouchi 38'	Report	Dao 2'; Ferrahi 90+6'	Stadium: Amar Hamam Stadium; Referee: Fateh Harkat

24 April 2025 Round 24	Paradou AC	0–0	ES Sétif	Baraki
18:00		Report		Stadium: Nelson Mandela Stadium; Referee: Akram Mechairia; VAR: Youcef Taieb Bouderbal

12 May 2025 Round 25	US Biskra	0–1	Paradou AC	Biskra
18:00		Report	Boulbina 41'	Stadium: 18 February Stadium; Referee: Tahar Boudjemaa; VAR: Fateh Harkat

17 May 2025 Round 26	Paradou AC	3–1	USM Alger	Baraki
19:30	Boulbina 4', 90+7'; Salem 19'	Report	Ghacha 80' (pen.)	Stadium: Nelson Mandela Stadium; Referee: Mustapha Ghorbal; VAR: Youcef Gamouh

27 May 2025 Round 27	CR Belouizdad	2–1	Paradou AC	Baraki
19:00	Mahious 56', 77'	Report	Yattou 5'	Stadium: Nelson Mandela Stadium; Referee: Lotfi Bekouassa; VAR: Youcef Taieb Bouderbal

12 June 2025 Round 28	Paradou AC	2–0	NC Magra	Baraki
21:00	Boulbina 84', 89'	Report		Stadium: Nelson Mandela Stadium; Referee: Yahia Dehar; VAR: Alaa Bouab

17 June 2025 Round 29	JS Saoura	3–2	Paradou AC	Béchar
20:00	Boutiche 53' (pen.); Bédi 64'; Souibaâh 90+4'	Report	Kermiche 45+7'; Bendouma 87'	Stadium: 20 August 1955 Stadium; Referee: Tayeb Benyabka

21 June 2025 Round 30	Paradou AC	1–3	ES Mostaganem	Blida
17:45	Sais 45+3'	Report	Mesmoudi 3'; Aoudjane 17'; Bouguettaya 77'	Stadium: Mustapha Tchaker Stadium; Referee: Alaa Bouab; VAR: Tahar Boudjemaa

=== Algerian Cup ===
6 January 2025 Round of 64	CRB Sendjas	1–3	Paradou AC	Chlef
14:30	Houraiba 12'	Report	Tahar 33'; Ait Abdessalem 57', 90+3'	Stadium: Mohamed Boumezrag Stadium; Referee: Haithem Ghouti

12 January 2025 Round of 32	Paradou AC	2–2 (a.e.t.) (3–4 p)	JS Haï Djebel	Algiers
14:30	Yattou 24'; Kermiche 56'	Report	Nedjah 51'; Guerzou 76'	Stadium: Stade du 5 Juillet; Referee: Mohamed Bouteraa
	Penalties
	Djaber Kaassis (penalty scored); Tahir Bin Amir (penalty scored); Mohamed Islam Abdelkader (penalty missed); Aymen Zakarya Sais (penalty scored); Adil Boulbina (penalty missed)		(penalty missed) Abdelli Nedjah; (penalty scored) Anis Hamadou; (penalty scored) Abdallah Chekhaoui; (penalty scored) Walid Jouba; (penalty scored) Noh Guerzou

== Squad information ==
=== Appearances and goals ===
As of 21 June 2025

No.	Pos	Player	Nat	Ligue 1			Algerian Cup			Total		
No.	Pos	Player	Nat	App	St	G	App	St	G	App	St	G
Goalkeepers
1	GK	Mohamed Hady Sahnoun	(Algeria)	3	2	0	0	0	0	3	2	0
16	GK	Mokhtar Ferrahi	(Algeria)	24	23	1	2	2	0	26	25	1
23	GK	Ahmed Abdelkader	(Algeria)	0	0	0	0	0	0	0	0	0
Defenders
2	DF	Abderahmane Saadi	(Algeria)	0	0	0	0	0	0	0	0	0
3	LB	Sabri Cheraitia	(Algeria)	2	1	0	0	0	0	2	1	0
5	CB	Ahmed Ait Abdesslem	(Algeria)	24	23	1	2	2	2	26	25	3
6	CB	Hamza Salem	(Algeria)	21	19	2	2	1	0	23	20	2
14	CB	Tahir Bin Amir	(Libya)	4	2	0	1	1	0	5	3	0
15	LB	Chouaib Boulkaboul	(Algeria)	4	4	0	1	0	0	5	4	0
22	LB	Abdellah Bendouma	(Algeria)	23	18	1	1	1	0	24	19	1
24	RB	Fouad Kermiche	(Algeria)	27	27	1	2	2	1	29	29	2
37	RB	Salah Eddine Zaoui	(Algeria)	12	9	0	2	1	0	14	10	0
41	CB	Ouanisse Bouzahzah	(Algeria)	18	16	1	0	0	0	18	16	1
Midfielders
8	DM	Nassim Yattou	(Algeria)	25	15	2	2	2	1	27	17	3
9	DM	Mohamed Ait El Hadj	(Algeria)	13	8	0	0	0	0	13	8	0
12	MF	Tameur Kerkar	(Algeria)	1	0	0	0	0	0	1	0	0
17	MF	Moncef Bisker	(Algeria)	0	0	0	0	0	0	0	0	0
18	DM	Abdeldjalil Tahri	(Algeria)	8	6	0	0	0	0	8	6	0
20	AM	Abderrahmane Berkoune	(Algeria)	16	10	0	1	0	0	17	10	0
25	CM	Islam Bouloudène	(Algeria)	4	3	0	0	0	0	4	3	0
26	DM	Taha Yassine Tahar	(Algeria)	21	18	0	1	1	0	22	19	0
27	CM	Djaber Kaassis	(Algeria)	23	23	2	2	1	0	25	24	2
31	CM	Mohammed Kerroum	(Algeria)	1	0	0	0	0	0	1	0	0
33	DM	Rafik Zaimeche	(Algeria)	1	1	0	0	0	0	1	1	0
37	CM	Mohamed Lamine Tahar	(Algeria)	12	5	1	1	0	0	13	5	1
38	MF	Mohamed Islam Abdelkader	(Algeria)	6	1	0	2	0	0	8	1	0
46	CM	Sid Ahmed Lahmer	(Algeria)	7	6	0	0	0	0	7	6	0
52	CM	Salaheddine Bouziani	(Algeria)	13	4	0	1	1	0	14	5	0
Forwards
7	LW	Adil Boulbina	(Algeria)	26	25	20	2	2	0	28	27	20
10	RW	Adel Belkacem Bouzida	(Algeria)	3	1	0	0	0	0	3	1	0
11	RW	Mustapha Soukkou	(Algeria)	25	16	1	2	1	0	27	17	1
13	ST	Youssouf Dao	(Ivory Coast)	13	7	1	0	0	0	13	7	1
19	ST	Christ Toulouenga	(Republic of the Congo)	2	0	0	0	0	0	2	0	0
21	LW	Aymen Zakarya Sais	(Algeria)	16	10	1	2	1	0	18	11	1
36	ST	Mohamed Ramdaoui	(Algeria)	13	5	2	2	1	0	15	6	2
39	ST	Ben Ahmed Kohili	(Algeria)	23	16	4	1	1	0	24	17	4
48	ST	Djafar Zabaiou	(Algeria)	0	0	0	0	0	0	0	0	0
Players transferred out during the season
~~23~~	GK	Abdelkader Morcely	(Algeria)	5	5	0	0	0	0	5	5	0
Total				30		41	2		5	32		46

Last updated: 21 June 2025
Source: mondefootball.fr

=== Goalscorers ===
As of 21 June 2025

Includes all competitive matches.

No.	Nat.	Player	Pos.	L1	AC	TOTAL
7	(Algeria)	Adil Boulbina	LW	20	0	20
39	(Algeria)	Ben Ahmed Kohili	ST	4	0	4
8	(Algeria)	Nassim Yattou	DM	2	1	3
5	(Algeria)	Ahmed Ait Abdesslem	CB	1	2	3
6	(Algeria)	Hamza Salem	CB	2	0	2
27	(Algeria)	Djaber Kaassis	CM	2	0	2
36	(Algeria)	Mohamed Ramdaoui	ST	2	0	2
24	(Algeria)	Fouad Kermiche	RB	1	1	2
41	(Algeria)	Ouanisse Bouzahzah	CB	1	0	1
22	(Algeria)	Abdellah Bendouma	LB	1	0	1
	(Algeria)	Mohamed Lamine Tahar	CM	1	0	1
21	(Algeria)	Aymen Zakarya Sais	LW	1	0	1
11	(Algeria)	Mustapha Djabril Soukkou	RW	1	0	1
16	(Algeria)	Mokhtar Ferrahi	GK	1	0	1
13	(Ivory Coast)	Youssouf Dao	ST	1	0	1
26	(Algeria)	Taha Yassine Tahar	DM	0	1	1
Own Goals				0	0	0
Totals				41	5	46

=== Clean sheets ===
As of 21 June 2025

					Clean sheets		
No.	Nat	Name	GP	GA	L 1	AC	Total
1	(Algeria)	Mohamed Hady Sahnoun	3	5	0	0	0
16	(Algeria)	Mokhtar Ferrahi	26	29	8	0	8
23	(Algeria)	Ahmed Abdelkader	0	0	0	0	0
Players transferred out during the season
23	(Algeria)	Abdelkader Morcely	5	8	1	0	1
		TOTALS		42	9	0	9
