= 2026–27 USM Alger season =

USM Alger
2026–27 season
- Owner: Groupe SERPORT
- President: Bilel Nouioua
- Head coach: Lamine N'Diaye
- Stadium: Stade du 5 Juillet
- Ligue 1: 7th
- Algerian Cup: Round of 64
- Super Cup: Final
- CAF Super Cup: Winners
- Confederation Cup: Group stage
Home colours	Away colours

The 2026–27 season, is USM Alger's 49th season and the club's 32nd consecutive season in the top flight of Algerian football. In addition to the domestic league, USM Alger are participating in this season's editions of the Algerian Cup, the Super Cup, the CAF Super Cup and the Confederation Cup.

== Review ==
=== Background ===
On 31 May 2026, Algeria national team head coach Vladimir Petković announced the official 26-man squad for the 2026 FIFA World Cup, one day before FIFA's submission deadline. Among the selected players were two representatives from USM Alger: goalkeeper Oussama Benbot and defender Achref Abada. Their inclusion rewarded their strong performances for the club and ensured that USM Alger would be represented on football's most prestigious international stage.

FIFA provides a Club Benefits Programme compensation of approximately $11,000 per day per player to clubs releasing players for the FIFA World Cup. For USM Alger, this applies notably to Benbot and Abada. Depending on Algeria's progress in the tournament whether they are eliminated in the group stage or advance to the knockout rounds the club could receive several hundred thousand dollars in compensation. Estimates suggest a minimum return of around $500,000, with the amount potentially increasing significantly if Algeria enjoys a deep run in the competition.

The contract extension of Lamine N'Diaye as head coach of USM Alger is becoming increasingly likely. Following productive meetings with sporting director Saïd Allik, both parties have reportedly reached a general agreement, with only a few financial details remaining to be finalized. After leading the club to a historic double, N'Diaye is seeking a salary increase that reflects his achievements.

N'Diaye has also requested greater authority over recruitment, insisting on having full control in order to build a squad that matches his tactical vision and meets the demands of the season. In attack, N'Diaye has requested two quality wingers and a striker, identifying the offensive department as the team's main weakness last season. The club's management appears willing to support these demands, viewing continuity and stability as key factors in maintaining the team's positive momentum and strengthening its competitiveness for the next campaign.

On 27 June 2026, USM Alger confirmed that head coach Lamine N'Diaye had signed a new two-year contract after several weeks of negotiations with the club's management. The agreement followed his return from a two-week holiday in Senegal, during which the remaining details were finalized with sporting director Saïd Allik. The contract extension reflected the club's confidence in the Senegalese coach following his positive results since taking charge and reaffirmed its commitment to maintaining stability ahead of the 2026–27 season.

On 30 June 2026, during USM Alger's Ordinary General Assembly held at the headquarters of Groupe SERPORT, the club's majority shareholder reaffirmed its commitment to supporting the sporting project for the 2026–27 season. In the presence of CEO Ryad Hadjal, Chairman of the Board Bilal Nouioua, and Sporting Director Saïd Allik, the moral and financial reports were approved before discussions turned to preparations for the new campaign. The club's leadership emphasized the importance of maintaining stability and announced increased financial backing for the summer transfer window, with the aim of recruiting players capable of strengthening the squad's competitiveness and enabling the team to challenge for domestic and continental titles.

== Squad list ==
Players and squad numbers last updated on 31 August 2026.
Note: Flags indicate national team as has been defined under FIFA eligibility rules. Players may hold more than one non-FIFA nationality.

No.	Nat.	Name	Position	Date of birth (age)	Signed in	Contract ends	Signed from	Apps	Goals	Transfer fees
Goalkeepers
1	(Algeria)	Abdelmoumen Sifour	GK	3 March 1998 (aged 28)	2023	2027	(Algeria) RC Arbaâ	14	0	Free transfer
16	(Algeria)	Mohamed Idir Hadid	GK	26 April 2002 (aged 24)	2026	2029	(Algeria) JS Kabylie	0	0	Free transfer
30	(Algeria)	Oussama Benbot	GK	11 October 1994 (aged 31)	2021	2030	(Algeria) JS Kabylie	157	0	Free transfer
Defenders
2	(Algeria)	Walid Kourdi	LB	20 September 2005 (aged 20)	2024	2028	(Algeria) Reserve team	6	0	Academy Player
4	(Cameroon)	Che Malone	CB	23 May 1999 (aged 27)	2025	2027	(Tanzania) Simba	39	1	200,000 €
5	(Algeria)	Imadeddine Azzi (Note: Azzi played previously for USM Alger from 2024 to 2025.)	CB	21 June 1998 (aged 28)	2026	2028	(Russia) Dynamo Makhachkala	37	1	355,000 €
12	(Algeria)	Haithem Loucif (Note: Loucif played previously for USM Alger from 2021 to 2023.)	RB / LB / DM	8 July 1996 (aged 30)	2025	2029	(Switzerland) Yverdon-Sport	105	3	Free transfer
19	(Algeria)	Saâdi Radouani (Note: Radouani played previously for USM Alger from 2015 to 2016.) (C.)	RB	18 March 1995 (aged 31)	2020	2030	(Algeria) ES Sétif	196	11	Free transfer
20	(Algeria)	Rayane Mahrouz	RB	30 November 2004 (aged 21)	2024	2029	(Algeria) Reserve team	49	4	Academy Player
21	(Algeria)	Issam Bayoud	RB / CB	2 October 2006 (aged 19)	2026	2030	(Algeria) Reserve team	2	1	Academy Player
23	(Algeria)	Ilyes Chetti	LB	22 January 1995 (aged 31)	2024	2027	(Morocco) Wydad AC	56	1	Free transfer
28	(Algeria)	Achref Abada	CB	15 June 1999 (aged 27)	2026	2029	(Algeria) ASO Chlef	11	0	100,000,000 DA
Midfielders
6	(Algeria)	Zakaria Draoui	DM / CM	12 February 1994 (aged 32)	2025	2029	(Algeria) MC Alger	42	6	Free transfer
8	(Algeria)	Abderaouf Benguit (Note: Benguit played previously for USM Alger from 2016 to 2019.)	CM	5 April 1996 (aged 30)	2026	2030	(Algeria) CR Belouizdad	102	7	Free transfer
9	(Algeria)	Farid Boulaya	AM	25 February 1993 (aged 33)	2026	2028	(Serbia) FK IMT	0	0	Free transfer
10	(Algeria)	Dhirar Bensaadallah	DM	4 March 2000 (aged 26)	2026	2029	(Algeria) Olympique Akbou	0	0	Free transfer
11	(Democratic Republic of the Congo)	Glody Likonza	AM	10 May 1998 (aged 28)	2024	2027	(Democratic Republic of the Congo) TP Mazembe	85	6	Free transfer
14	(Algeria)	Salaheddine Bouziani	CM / DM	21 January 2006 (aged 20)	2026	2031	(Algeria) Paradou AC	0	0	80,000,000 DA
17	(Senegal)	Aimé Tendeng	AM	1 January 2001 (aged 25)	2025	2028	(Sudan) Al Hilal	44	2	260,000 €
18	(Algeria)	Alaeddine Limane	DM	6 May 2006 (aged 20)	2026	2029	(Algeria) Reserve team	6	0	Academy Player
Forwards
7	(Algeria)	Ahmed Khaldi	RW / LW	22 July 1998 (aged 28)	2024	2029	(Kuwait) Al-Arabi SC	62	16	Free transfer
15	(Algeria)	Mohamed Ramdaoui	ST	23 July 2005 (aged 20)	2026	2029	(Algeria) Paradou AC	0	0	150,000,000 DA
22	(Algeria)	Mohamed Gherbi	ST	10 June 2004 (aged 22)	2026	2029	(Algeria) Olympique Akbou	0	0	Undisclosed
24	(Algeria)	Mohamed Bouderbala	LW	6 July 2005 (aged 21)	2025	2028	(Algeria) USM El Harrach	31	4	Free transfer
26	(Algeria)	Ghiles Guenaoui	LW	2 August 1998 (aged 28)	2024	2027	(Egypt) Al Masry SC	16	1	200,000 €
27	(Algeria)	Houssam Ghacha	LW / RW	22 October 1995 (aged 30)	2024	2029	(Tunisia) Espérance de Tunis	74	17	Free transfer
29	(Ivory Coast)	Dramane Kamagaté	ST	1 May 2005 (aged 21)	2026	2030	(Ivory Coast) San Pédro	20	1	400,000 €

== Transfers ==
=== In ===
==== Summer ====
Date	Pos	Player	Moving from	Fee	Source
6 June 2026	LW	(Algeria) Ghiles Guenaoui	CS Constantine	Loan return	
13 July 2026	DM	(Algeria) Dhirar Bensaadallah	Olympique Akbou	Free transfer	
13 July 2026	CM	(Algeria) Salaheddine Bouziani	Paradou AC	80,000,000 DA (Note: Salaheddine Bouziani was transferred to USM Alger for a reported fee of DZD 80 million (approximately €548,000 at the official exchange rate).)	
13 July 2026	CM	(Algeria) Abderaouf Benguit	CR Belouizdad	Free transfer	
13 July 2026	GK	(Algeria) Mohamed Idir Hadid	JS Kabylie	Free transfer	
13 July 2026	RB	(Algeria) Issam Bayoud	Youth team	First Professional Contract	
13 July 2026	DM	(Algeria) Alaeddine Limane	Youth team	First Professional Contract	
3 August 2026	ST	(Algeria) Mohamed Gherbi	Olympique Akbou	Undisclosed	
8 August 2026	ST	(Algeria) Mohamed Ramdaoui	Paradou AC	150,000,000 DA (Note: Mohamed Ramdaoui was transferred to USM Alger for a reported fee of DZD 150 million (approximately €1.03 million at the official exchange rate).)	
20 August 2026	AM	(Algeria) Farid Boulaya	(Serbia) FK IMT	Free transfer	

=== Out ===
==== Summer ====
Date	Pos	Player	Moving to	Fee	Source
13 June 2026	AM	(Algeria) Islam Merili	(Libya) Al Ahly SC	Free transfer	
13 July 2026	GK	(Algeria) Kamel Soufi	MC Oran	Free transfer	
13 July 2026	CB	(Algeria) Safieddine Atmania	CR Témouchent	Loan for one season	
13 July 2026	DM	(Algeria) Brahim Benzaza	Unattached	End of contract	
17 July 2026	ST	(Algeria) Riad Benayad	Unattached	End of contract	
28 July 2026	CB	(Algeria) Hocine Dehiri	(Libya) Al Ahli SC	900,000 $	
16 August 2026	LW	(Algeria) Moncif Boutaoui	RC Arbaâ	Free transfer	
20 August 2026	DM	(Algeria) Omar Boularas	ASM Oran	Free transfer	

=== New contracts ===
No.	Pos	Player	Contract length	Contract end	Date	Source
30	GK	Oussama Benbot	4 years	2030	23 August 2026	
19	RB	Saâdi Radouani	4 years	2030	23 August 2026	
12	RB	Haithem Loucif	3 years	2029	23 August 2026	
20	RB	Rayane Mahrouz	3 years	2029	23 August 2026	
6	DM	Zakaria Draoui	3 years	2029	23 August 2026	
7	RW	Ahmed Khaldi	3 years	2029	23 August 2026	
27	LW	Houssam Ghacha	3 years	2029	23 August 2026	
	LW	Ahmed Achouri (Note: USM Alger Reserve)	3 years	2029	9 September 2026	

== Competitions ==
=== Overview ===
Competition	Record								Started round	Final position / round	First match	Last match
Competition	G	W	D	L	GF	GA	GD	Win %	Started round	Final position / round	First match	Last match
Ligue 1	8	4	2	2	10	7	+3	50.00	—N/a	To be confirmed	4 September 2026	In Progress
Algerian Cup	0	0	0	0	0	0	+0	—	Round of 64	To be confirmed	December 2026	In Progress
Super Cup	0	0	0	0	0	0	+0	—	Final	To be confirmed	2 January 2027	
Confederation Cup	0	0	0	0	0	0	+0	—	Second round	To be confirmed	October 2026	In Progress
CAF Super Cup	1	1	0	0	3	1	+2	100.00	Final	Winners	8 November 2026	
Total	9	5	2	2	13	8	+5	55.56				

Updated to match played 19 November 2026
Source: Competitions

=== Ligue 1 ===
==== League table ====
Pos	Team	Pld	W	D	L	GF	GA	GD	Pts
5	MC Alger	8	5	1	2	9	3	+6	16
6	Olympique Akbou	9	4	3	2	10	6	+4	15
7	USM Alger	8	4	2	2	10	7	+3	14
8	JS El Biar	10	3	3	4	13	12	+1	12
9	CR Témouchent	10	2	5	3	7	10	−3	11

Updated to match(es) played on 20 November 2026. Source: lfp.dz
Rules for classification: 1) Points; 2) Head-to-head points; 3) Head-to-head goal difference; 4) First half goal difference; 5) First half total goals; 6) Fairplay ranking; 7) Playoff.

==== Results summary ====
Overall								Home						Away					
Pld	W	D	L	GF	GA	GD	Pts	W	D	L	GF	GA	GD	W	D	L	GF	GA	GD
8	4	2	2	10	7	+3	14	2	1	0	5	2	+3	2	1	2	5	5	0

Last updated: 19 November 2026.
Source: Competitive matches

==== Results by round ====
Round	1	2	3	4	5	6	7	8	9	10	11	12	13	14	15	16	17	18	19	20	21	22	23	24	25	26	27	28	29	30
Ground	A	H	A	A	H	A	H	A	H	A	H	A	H	A	H	H	A	H	H	A	H	A	H	A	H	A	H	A	H	A
Result	D	W	W	L	W		D	W		L																				
Position																														

Updated to match(es) played on 19 November 2026. Source: Competitive matches
A = Away; H = Home; W = Win; D = Draw; L = Loss

==== Matches ====
The league fixtures were announced on 3 August 2026.

All times are local, WAT (UTC+1).

Win Draw Loss Postponed

4 September 2026 Round 1	USM Khenchela	0–0	USM Alger	Khenchela
17:00		Flashscore; LFP		Stadium: Amar Hamam Stadium; Referee: Abdelali Ibrir; Assistant referees: Lamine Chellali, Abdelkader Menacer; Fourth official: Zine Elabidine Dekhane

10 September 2026 Round 2	USM Alger	2–0	JS El Biar	Algiers
21:00	Draoui 30'; Ramdaoui 58'	Flashscore; LFP		Stadium: Stade du 5 Juillet; Referee: Yahia Dahar; Assistant referees: Adel Abane, Boumediene Touileb; Fourth official: Mohamed Bouchaker; VAR: Rafiq Aouina

19 September 2026 Round 3	Olympique Akbou	2–3	USM Alger	Akbou
16:00	Boutiche 37' (pen.); Hitala 60'	Flashscore; LFP	Ramdaoui 21'; Farhi 48' (o.g.); Kamagaté 78'	Stadium: Martyrs Stadium; Referee: Alaa Bouab; Assistant referees: Hamza Bouzit, Islem Boukhatem; Fourth official: Mohamed Hamadache; VAR: Redouane Allou

8 October 2026 Round 4	MB Rouissat	1–0	USM Alger	Ouargla
18:00	El Orfi 59' (pen.)	Flashscore; LFP		Stadium: 18 February Stadium; Referee: Fateh Harkat; Assistant referees: Mohamed Ghozlane, Amirouche Boufassa; Fourth official: Abbes Beba; VAR: Yahia Dehar

13 October 2026 Round 5	USM Alger	1–0	JS Saoura	Algiers
20:15	Bouderbala 31'	Flashscore; LFP		Stadium: Stade du 5 Juillet; Referee: Akram Mechaïria; Assistant referees: Hamza Zitouni, Mohamed Lamine Benhamouda; Fourth official: VAR: Abderrahmane Sahraoui

24 October 2026 Round 7	USM Alger	2–2	CR Belouizdad	Algiers
17:45	Ramdaoui 45+10' (pen.); Khaldi 57' (pen.)	Flashscore; LFP	Ben Hammouda 8' (pen.), 28'	Stadium: Stade du 5 Juillet; Referee: Mustapha Ghorbal; Assistant referees: Mokrane Gourari, Akram Zerhouni; Fourth official: Mohamed Hamadouche; VAR: Lahlou Benbraham

31 October 2026 Round 8	CS Constantine	0–2	USM Alger	Constantine
17:00		Flashscore; LFP	Ramdaoui 12', 40'	Stadium: Chahid Hamlaoui Stadium; Referee: Youcef Taieb Bouderbal; Assistant referees: Boumediene Touileb, Boualem Boutaiba; Fourth official: Adel Fecih; VAR: Redouane Allou

19 November 2026 Round 10	JS Kabylie	2–0	USM Alger	Tizi Ouzou
20:00	Belhocini 32', 51'	Flashscore; LFP		Stadium: Hocine Aït Ahmed Stadium; Referee: Rafiq Aouina; Assistant referees: Haitham Bouima, Youcef Arioua; Fourth official: Sid Ahmed Lellouchi; VAR: Redouane Allou

23 November 2026 Round 6	ES Ben Aknoun	–	USM Alger	Belouizdad
17:45		Flashscore; LFP		Stadium: 20 August 1955 Stadium; Referee: Yahia Dahar; Assistant referees: Adel Abane, Mohamed Rezga; Fourth official: Anes Azrine; VAR: Ghada Mehat

Round 9	USM Alger	–	MC Oran	Algiers
:		Flashscore; LFP		Stadium: Stade du 5 Juillet; Fourth official: VAR:

Round 11	USM Alger	–	MC Alger	Algiers
:		Flashscore; LFP		Stadium: Stade du 5 Juillet; Fourth official: VAR:

Round 12	CR Témouchent	–	USM Alger	Aïn Témouchent
:		Flashscore; LFP		Stadium: Omar Oucief Stadium; Fourth official: VAR:

Round 13	USM Alger	–	ASO Chlef	Algiers
:		Flashscore; LFP		Stadium: Stade du 5 Juillet; Fourth official: VAR:

Round 14	ES Sétif	–	USM Alger	Sétif
:		Flashscore; LFP		Stadium: 8 May 1945 Stadium; Fourth official: VAR:

Round 15	USM Alger	–	US Biskra	Algiers
:		Flashscore; LFP		Stadium: Stade du 5 Juillet; Fourth official: VAR:

Round 16	USM Alger	–	USM Khenchela	Algiers
:		Flashscore; LFP		Stadium: Stade du 5 Juillet; Fourth official: VAR:

Round 17	JS El Biar	–	USM Alger	Blida
:		Flashscore; LFP		Stadium: Mustapha Tchaker Stadium; Fourth official: VAR:

Round 18	USM Alger	–	Olympique Akbou	Algiers
		Flashscore; LFP		Stadium: Stade du 5 Juillet; Fourth official: VAR:

Round 19	USM Alger	–	MB Rouissat	Algiers
:		Flashscore; LFP		Stadium: Stade du 5 Juillet; Fourth official: VAR:

Round 20	JS Saoura	–	USM Alger	Béchar
:		Flashscore; LFP		Stadium: 20 August 1955 Stadium; Fourth official: VAR:

Round 21	USM Alger	–	ES Ben Aknoun	Algiers
:		Flashscore; LFP		Stadium: Stade du 5 Juillet; Fourth official: VAR:

Round 22	CR Belouizdad	–	USM Alger	Baraki
:		Flashscore; LFP		Stadium: Nelson Mandela Stadium; Fourth official: VAR:

Round 23	USM Alger	–	CS Constantine	Algiers
:		Flashscore; LFP		Stadium: Stade du 5 Juillet; Fourth official: VAR:

Round 24	MC Oran	–	USM Alger	Bir El Djir
:		Flashscore; LFP		Stadium: Miloud Hadefi Stadium; Fourth official: VAR:

Round 25	USM Alger	–	JS Kabylie	Algiers
:		Flashscore; LFP		Stadium: Stade du 5 Juillet; Fourth official: VAR:

Round 26	MC Alger	–	USM Alger	Douéra
:		Flashscore; LFP		Stadium: Ali La Pointe Stadium; Fourth official: VAR:

Round 27	USM Alger	–	CR Témouchent	Algiers
:		Flashscore; LFP		Stadium: Stade du 5 Juillet; Fourth official: VAR:

Round 28	ASO Chlef	–	USM Alger	Chlef
:		Flashscore; LFP		Stadium: Mohamed Boumezrag Stadium; Fourth official: VAR:

Round 29	USM Alger	–	ES Sétif	Algiers
:		Flashscore; LFP		Stadium: Stade du 5 Juillet; Fourth official: VAR:

Round 30	US Biskra	–	USM Alger	Zeribet El Oued
:		Flashscore; LFP		Stadium: Bouhafs Chabi Stadium; Fourth official: VAR:

=== Algerian Cup ===
December 2026 Round of 64	–
:

=== Super Cup ===
2 January 2027	MC Alger	–	USM Alger
:				Fourth official: VAR:

=== CAF Super Cup ===
The CAF Super Cup is played as a single match at a neutral venue, with the CAF Champions League winners designated as the "home" team for administrative purposes. If the score is tied at the end of regulation, extra time will not be played, and the penalty shoot-out will be used to determine the winner (CAF Champions League Regulations XXVII and CAF Confederation Cup Regulations XXV).

8 November 2026 Final	Mamelodi Sundowns (South Africa)	1–3	(Algeria) USM Alger	Pretoria
15:00 UTC+2	Rayners 25' (pen.)	Report	Draoui 4'; Radouani 37'; Khaldi 55'	Stadium: Loftus Versfeld Stadium; Referee: Dahane Beida (Mauritania); Assistant referees: Djibril Camara (Senegal), Elvis Noupoue (Cameroon); Fourth official: Abdelaziz Bouh (Mauritania); VAR: Babacar Sarr (Mauritania)

=== Confederation Cup ===
==== Qualifying rounds ====
In the qualifying rounds, each tie will be played on a home-and-away two-legged basis. If the aggregate score will be tied after the second leg, the away goals rule will be applied, and if still tied, extra time will not be played, and a penalty shoot-out will be used to determine the winner (Regulations III. 13 & 14).

===== Second round =====
20 October 2026 First leg	The Panthers (Equatorial Guinea)	w/o (Note: USM Alger qualified for the group stage of the CAF Confederation Cup following the withdrawal of The Panthers. The Equatorial Guinean club withdrew from the competition due to financial difficulties linked to the lack of an approved stadium in its country. The CAF cancelled the two-legged tie, allowing USM Alger to advance directly to the group stage.)	(Algeria) USM Alger	Algiers
20:00 UTC+1		Report		Stadium: Stade du 5 Juillet; Referee: Mohamed Diraneh (Djibouti)

25 October 2026 Second leg	USM Alger (Algeria)	w/o (– agg.)	(Equatorial Guinea) The Panthers	Algiers
20:00 UTC+1		Report		Stadium: Stade du 5 Juillet; Referee: Antsino Twanyanyukwa (Namibia)

==== Group stage ====
The draw for the group stage was held on 28 October 2026 11:00 GMT (14:00 local time, UTC+3), at the Egyptian Football Association headquarters in Cairo, Egypt.. The 16 winners of the second round will be drawn into four groups of four. The teams will be seeded by their performances in the CAF competitions for the previous five seasons (CAF 5-year ranking points shown next to every team). Each group will contain one team from each of Pot 1 and Pot 2, Pot 3 and Pot 4, and each team will be allocated to the positions in their group according to their pot.

29 November 2026 1	USM Alger (Algeria)	–	(Mali) Real Bamako	Algiers
20:00 UTC+1		Report		Stadium: Stade du 5 Juillet

6 December 2026 2	Black Bulls (Mozambique)	–	(Algeria) USM Alger	Maputo
15:00 UTC+2		Report		Stadium: Matola Stadium

18–20 December 2026 3	USM Alger (Algeria)	–	(Tunisia) CS Sfaxien	Algiers
: UTC+1		Report		Stadium: Stade du 5 Juillet

8–10 January 2027 4	CS Sfaxien (Tunisia)	–	(Algeria) USM Alger	Sfax
: UTC+1		Report		Stadium: Taieb Mhiri Stadium

15–17 January 2027 5	Real Bamako (Mali)	–	(Algeria) USM Alger	Bamako
: UTC+0		Report		Stadium: Mamadou Konaté Stadium

22–24 January 2027 6	USM Alger (Algeria)	–	(Mozambique) Black Bulls	Algiers
: UTC+1		Report		Stadium: Stade du 5 Juillet

== Squad information ==
=== Appearances and goals ===
As of 19 November 2026

No.	Pos	Player	Nat	Ligue 1			Algerian Cup			Super Cup			CAF Super Cup			Confederation Cup			Total		
No.	Pos	Player	Nat	App	St	G	App	St	G	App	St	G	App	St	G	App	St	G	App	St	G
Goalkeepers
1	GK	Abdelmoumen Sifour	(Algeria)	0	0	0	0	0	0	0	0	0	0	0	0	0	0	0	0	0	0
16	GK	Mohamed Idir Hadid	(Algeria)	0	0	0	0	0	0	0	0	0	0	0	0	0	0	0	0	0	0
30	GK	Oussama Benbot	(Algeria)	8	8	0	0	0	0	0	0	0	1	1	0	0	0	0	0	0	0
Defenders
2	LB	Walid Kourdi	(Algeria)	0	0	0	0	0	0	0	0	0	0	0	0	0	0	0	0	0	0
4	CB	Che Malone	(Cameroon)	6	3	0	0	0	0	0	0	0	1	0	0	0	0	0	0	0	0
5	CB	Imadeddine Azzi	(Algeria)	7	7	0	0	0	0	0	0	0	1	1	0	0	0	0	0	0	0
12	RB	Haithem Loucif	(Algeria)	8	7	0	0	0	0	0	0	0	1	1	0	0	0	0	0	0	0
19	RB	Saâdi Radouani	(Algeria)	6	5	0	0	0	0	0	0	0	1	1	1	0	0	0	0	0	0
20	RB	Rayane Mahrouz	(Algeria)	6	6	0	0	0	0	0	0	0	1	1	0	0	0	0	0	0	0
21	RB	Issam Bayoud	(Algeria)	1	0	0	0	0	0	0	0	0	0	0	0	0	0	0	0	0	0
23	LB	Ilyes Chetti	(Algeria)	2	2	0	0	0	0	0	0	0	0	0	0	0	0	0	0	0	0
28	CB	Achref Abada	(Algeria)	6	6	0	0	0	0	0	0	0	1	1	0	0	0	0	0	0	0
Midfielders
6	DM	Zakaria Draoui	(Algeria)	8	8	1	0	0	0	0	0	0	1	1	1	0	0	0	0	0	0
8	CM	Abderaouf Benguit	(Algeria)	7	5	0	0	0	0	0	0	0	0	0	0	0	0	0	0	0	0
9	AM	Farid Boulaya	(Algeria)	5	2	0	0	0	0	0	0	0	1	1	0	0	0	0	0	0	0
10	DM	Dhirar Bensaadallah	(Algeria)	5	1	0	0	0	0	0	0	0	0	0	0	0	0	0	0	0	0
11	AM	Glody Likonza	(Democratic Republic of the Congo)	8	8	0	0	0	0	0	0	0	1	1	0	0	0	0	0	0	0
14	CM	Salaheddine Bouziani	(Algeria)	1	0	0	0	0	0	0	0	0	0	0	0	0	0	0	0	0	0
17	AM	Aimé Tendeng	(Senegal)	5	1	0	0	0	0	0	0	0	1	0	0	0	0	0	0	0	0
18	DM	Alaeddine Limane	(Algeria)	0	0	0	0	0	0	0	0	0	0	0	0	0	0	0	0	0	0
Forwards
7	RW	Ahmed Khaldi	(Algeria)	5	3	1	0	0	0	0	0	0	1	1	1	0	0	0	0	0	0
15	ST	Mohamed Ramdaoui	(Algeria)	6	6	5	0	0	0	0	0	0	1	1	0	0	0	0	0	0	0
22	ST	Mohamed Gherbi	(Algeria)	3	0	0	0	0	0	0	0	0	0	0	0	0	0	0	0	0	0
24	LW	Mohamed Bouderbala	(Algeria)	7	6	1	0	0	0	0	0	0	0	0	0	0	0	0	0	0	0
26	LW	Ghiles Guenaoui	(Algeria)	5	2	0	0	0	0	0	0	0	1	0	0	0	0	0	0	0	0
27	LW	Houssam Ghacha	(Algeria)	3	0	0	0	0	0	0	0	0	0	0	0	0	0	0	0	0	0
29	ST	Dramane Kamagaté	(Ivory Coast)	7	2	1	0	0	0	0	0	0	1	0	0	0	0	0	0	0	0
Total				8		10	0		0	0		0	1		3	0		0	0		0

Last updated: 19 November 2026
Source: soccerway.com

=== Disciplinary record ===
As of 19 November 2026

No.	Pos.	Player	Ligue 1			Algerian Cup			Super Cup			CAF Super Cup			Confederation Cup			Total		
No.	Pos.	Player	Yellow card	(yellow card) (yellow-red card)	Red card	Yellow card	(yellow card) (yellow-red card)	Red card	Yellow card	(yellow card) (yellow-red card)	Red card	Yellow card	(yellow card) (yellow-red card)	Red card	Yellow card	(yellow card) (yellow-red card)	Red card	Yellow card	(yellow card) (yellow-red card)	Red card
30	GK	(Algeria) Oussama Benbot	2	0	0	0	0	0	0	0	0	0	0	0	0	0	0	2	0	0
4	CB	(Cameroon) Che Malone	1	0	0	0	0	0	0	0	0	0	0	0	0	0	0	1	0	0
5	CB	(Algeria) Imadeddine Azzi	3	0	0	0	0	0	0	0	0	0	0	0	0	0	0	3	0	0
19	RB	(Algeria) Saâdi Radouani	1	0	0	0	0	0	0	0	0	1	0	0	0	0	0	2	0	0
20	RB	(Algeria) Rayane Mahrouz	2	0	0	0	0	0	0	0	0	0	0	0	0	0	0	2	0	0
28	CB	(Algeria) Achref Abada	0	0	1	0	0	0	0	0	0	0	0	0	0	0	0	0	0	1
6	DM	(Algeria) Zakaria Draoui	2	0	0	0	0	0	0	0	0	0	0	0	0	0	0	2	0	0
11	AM	(Democratic Republic of the Congo) Glody Likonza	1	0	0	0	0	0	0	0	0	0	0	0	0	0	0	1	0	0
15	ST	(Algeria) Mohamed Ramdaoui	0	0	0	0	0	0	0	0	0	1	0	0	0	0	0	1	0	0
22	ST	(Algeria) Mohamed Gherbi	2	0	0	0	0	0	0	0	0	0	0	0	0	0	0	2	0	0
26	LW	(Algeria) Ghiles Guenaoui	1	0	0	0	0	0	0	0	0	0	0	0	0	0	0	1	0	0
Total			15	0	1	0	0	0	0	0	0	2	0	0	0	0	0	17	0	1

=== Goalscorers ===
As of 19 November 2026

Includes all competitive matches.

No.	Nat.	Player	Pos.	L1	AC	SC	CS	CC	TOTAL
15	(Algeria)	Mohamed Ramdaoui	ST	5	0	0	0	0	5
6	(Algeria)	Zakaria Draoui	DM	1	0	0	1	0	2
7	(Algeria)	Ahmed Khaldi	RW	1	0	0	1	0	2
29	(Ivory Coast)	Dramane Kamagaté	ST	1	0	0	0	0	1
24	(Algeria)	Mohamed Bouderbala	LW	1	0	0	0	0	1
19	(Algeria)	Saâdi Radouani	RB	0	0	0	1	0	1
Own Goals				1	0	0	0	0	1
Totals				10	0	0	3	0	13

=== Assists ===
As of 19 November 2026

Includes all competitive matches.

No.	Nat.	Player	Pos.	L1	AC	SC	CS	CC	TOTAL
7	(Algeria)	Ahmed Khaldi	RW	1	0	0	1	0	2
19	(Algeria)	Saâdi Radouani	RB	1	0	0	0	0	1
26	(Algeria)	Ghiles Guenaoui	LW	1	0	0	0	0	1
12	(Algeria)	Haithem Loucif	RB	1	0	0	0	0	1
24	(Algeria)	Mohamed Bouderbala	LW	1	0	0	0	0	1
17	(Senegal)	Aimé Tendeng	AM	0	0	0	1	0	1
Totals				5	0	0	2	0	7

=== Penalties ===
Date	Nat.	Name	Opponent	Scored?
19 September 2026	(Algeria)	Mohamed Ramdaoui	Olympique Akbou	Penalty missed
24 October 2026	(Algeria)	Zakaria Draoui	CR Belouizdad	Penalty missed
24 October 2026	(Algeria)	Mohamed Ramdaoui	CR Belouizdad	Penalty scored
24 October 2026	(Algeria)	Ahmed Khaldi	CR Belouizdad	Penalty scored

=== Clean sheets ===
As of 19 November 2026

Includes all competitive matches.

					Clean sheets					
No.	Nat	Name	GP	GA	L1	AC	SC	CS	CC	Total
1	(Algeria)	Abdelmoumen Sifour	0	0	0	0	0	0	0	0
16	(Algeria)	Mohamed Idir Hadid	0	0	0	0	0	0	0	0
30	(Algeria)	Oussama Benbot	9	8	4	0	0	0	0	4
		TOTALS		8	4	0	0	0	0	4
