= 2025–26 Algerian Cup =

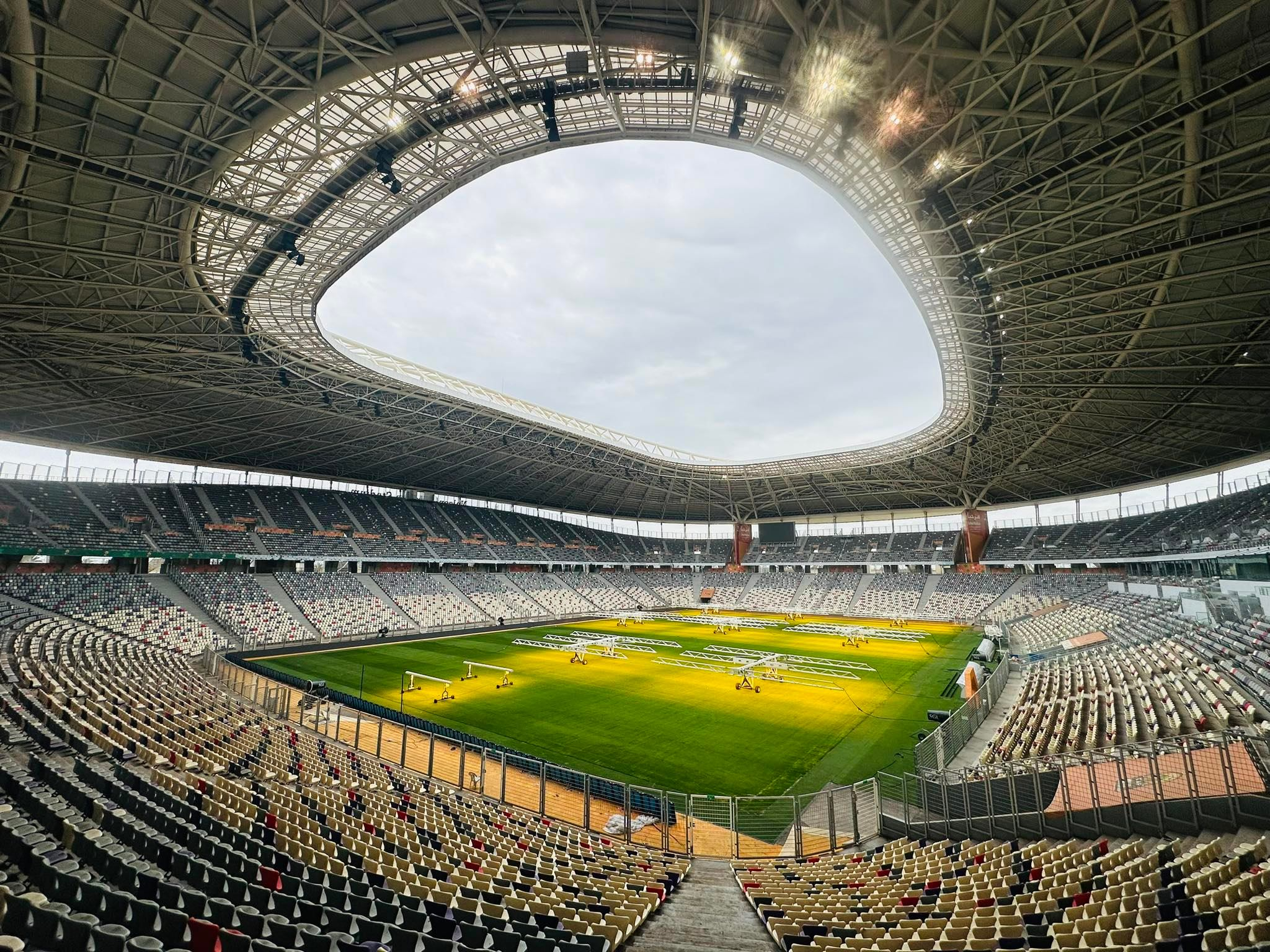
- The Nelson Mandela Stadium hosted the final

Tournament details
- Country: Algeria
- Dates: 3 December 2025 – 30 April 2026
- Teams: 64 (as of first national round)

Final positions
- Champions: USM Alger
- Runners-up: CR Belouizdad

Tournament statistics
- Matches played: 63
- Goals scored: 165 (2.62 per match)
- Top goal scorer(s): Houssam Ghacha (4 goals)
- All statistics correct as of 30 April 2026.

The 2025–26 Algerian Cup (Arabic: كأس الجزائر 26-2025), known as the Mobilis Algerian Cup for sponsorship purposes, was the 59th edition of the Algerian Cup. The winners qualified to the 2026 Algerian Super Cup and 2026–27 CAF Confederation Cup. USM Alger were the defending champions. They managed to defend their title to win their tenth title in the competition.

== Teams ==
| Round | Clubs remaining | Clubs involved | Winners from previous round | New entries this round | Leagues entering at this round |
Regional rounds
| First round | - | - | - | - | Ligue de Football de la Wilaya; Ligue Régional II; Ligue Régional I |
| Second round | - | - | - | - | Interregional League |
| Third round | - | - | - | - | none |
| Fourth round | - | - | - | - | Algerian League 2 |
| Fifth round | - | - | - | - | none |
National rounds
| Round of 64 | 64 | 64 | 48 | 16 | Algerian Ligue Professionnelle 1 |
| Round of 32 | 32 | 32 | 32 | none | none |
| Round of 16 | 16 | 16 | 16 | none | none |
| Quarter-finals | 8 | 8 | 8 | none | none |
| Semi-finals | 4 | 4 | 4 | none | none |
| Final | 2 | 2 | 2 | none | none |

== Round of 64 ==
The draw was made on 27 November 2025The schedule of the round of 64 was published on 30 November 2025.

| 6 December 2025 1 | CA Batna (2) | 1–1 (a.e.t.) (3–1 p) | USM Annaba (2) | Batna |
| 14:00 | Lalaouna 68' | Report | Guerioua 90+1' | Stadium: 1 November 1954 Stadium; Referee: Bilal Bendjahene |

| 5 December 2025 2 | ESM Koléa (2) | 1–0 | JS Bordj Menaïel (2) | Koléa |
| 14:30 | Zerroukhat 45+3' | Report | | Stadium: Mohamed Mouaz Stadium; Referee: Lotfi Bekouassa |

| 4 December 2025 3 | Paradou AC (1) | 3–0 | CRB Adrar (2) | Kouba |
| 14:00 | Ramdaoui 2'; Zaoui 44'; Lahmer 46' | Report | | Stadium: Mohamed Benhaddad Stadium; Referee: Zouhir Mansari |

| 4 December 2025 4 | USF Constantine (3) | 4–2 (a.e.t.) | ASB Metlili Chaamba (3) | Constantine |
| 14:00 | Bounaas 90', 90+4', 111'; Touati 103' | Report | Houdachi 57'; Belhadj 75' | Stadium: Ramadane Ben Abdelmalek Stadium; Referee: Djameleddine Zenati |

| 6 December 2025 5 | FCB Frenda (3) | 2–1 | CB Mila (3) | Frenda |
| 14:00 | Aouissi 31'; Mekroussi 75' | Report | Benchoucha 7' | Stadium: Mohamed Tahar Chaouch Stadium; Referee: Abderahmane Mohamed Belkebir |

| 5 December 2025 6 | ASO Chlef (1) | 1–0 | CA Sidi Abdelmoumen (3) | Chlef |
| 16:00 | Avotor 32' | Report | | Stadium: Mohamed Boumezrag Stadium; Referee: Zinelaabidine Dakhane |

| 5 December 2025 7 | MB Barika (3) | 1–0 | O Mers El Hadjadj (5) | Barika |
| 14:30 | Bendekkiche 17' | Report | | Stadium: Mohamed Ghalmi Stadium; Referee: Naim Bouara |

| 4 December 2025 8 | MC Saïda (2) | 3–0 | NRB Teleghma (2) | Saïda |
| 14:00 | Serraoui 5' (pen.); Amieur 8'; Benouis 46' | Report | | Stadium: Saïd Amara Stadium; Referee: Mehadji Tayeb Bouderbal |

| 5 December 2025 9 | MO Béjaïa (2) | 1–2 | USM El Harrach (2) | Béjaïa |
| 14:30 | Kermiche 90+3' | Report | Bechou 5'; Zouari 77' | Stadium: Maghrebi Unity Stadium; Referee: Akram Mechairia |

| 4 December 2025 10 | JS Kabylie (1) | 7–0 | MB Hassi Messaoud (3) | Tizi Ouzou |
| 17:45 | Bellaouel 4'; Lahmeri 6'; Messaoudi 16' (pen.); Mahious 36'; Hamidi 39'; Malki 62'; Tichtich 89' | Report | | Stadium: Hocine Aït Ahmed Stadium; Referee: Mehdi Oukil |

| 4 December 2025 11 | NC Magra (2) | 0–0 (a.e.t.) (4–5 p) | USM Alger (1) | Magra |
| 14:00 | | Report | | Stadium: Boucheligue Brothers Stadium; Referee: Nabil Boukhalfa |
| | Penalties |
| | Tamer (penalty scored); Bouchouareb (penalty scored); Nemdil (penalty scored); Bouhalfaya (penalty missed); Mohra (penalty scored) | | Ghacha (penalty scored); Alilet (penalty scored); Radouani (penalty scored); Benayad (penalty scored); Merili (penalty scored) |

| 6 December 2025 12 | MO Constantine (2) | 3–1 | CRB Kaïs (3) | Constantine |
| 14:00 | Barmati 15'; Nait Salem 43'; Maizou 82' | Report | Mihi 5' | Stadium: Ramadane Ben Abdelmalek Stadium; Referee: Sid Ahmed Lellouchi |

| 4 December 2025 13 | MC Sidi Ali Boussidi (3) | 0–1 | RC Arbaâ (2) | Sidi Bel Abbès |
| 14:00 | | Report | Rabti 90+3' (pen.) | Stadium: 24 February Stadium; Referee: Mustapha Smail |

| 5 December 2025 14 | MC Oran (1) | 1–2 | ES Mostaganem (1) | Bir El Djir |
| 17:00 | Kerroum 45+7' (pen.) | Report | Motrani 69'; Askar 74' | Stadium: Miloud Hadefi Stadium; Referee: Anes Azrine |

| 6 December 2025 15 | NRB Bethioua (4) | 0–1 | JS Saoura (1) | Bethioua |
| 14:00 | | Report | Boutiche 37' | Stadium: Mohamed Cerra Cheraka Stadium; Referee: Oussama Mekfoudji |

| 4 December 2025 16 | AS Khroub (2) | 2–0 | Olympique Akbou (1) | El Khroub |
| 14:00 | Benbayoud 37'; Hamdaoui 82' (pen.) | Report | | Stadium: Abed Hamdani Stadium; Referee: Mohamed Chaoubi |

| 5 December 2025 17 | CS Constantine (1) | 4–1 (a.e.t.) | JS El Biar (2) | Constantine |
| 16:00 | Benchaira 45+2'; Bensayah 93', 113'; Grine 117' | Report | Bensahaila 47' | Stadium: Chahid Hamlaoui Stadium; Referee: Youcef Tayeb Bouderbal |

| 6 December 2025 18 | CR Témouchent (2) | 1–0 | US El Hemaïssa (3) | Aïn Témouchent |
| 14:00 | Beloufa 11' (pen.) | Report | | Stadium: Omar Oucief Stadium; Referee: Mohamed Benzohra |

| 6 December 2025 19 | US Béchar Djedid (2) | 3–3 (a.e.t.) (4–2 p) | GC Mascara (2) | Béchar |
| 14:00 | Dahmane 19', 72'; Issaadi 93' | Report | Touati 36'; Gasmi 54'; Belhocine 106' | Stadium: 20 August 1955 Stadium; Referee: Hichem Benokba |

| 6 December 2025 20 | ES Sétif (1) | 1–0 | CRB Beni Tamou (3) | Sétif |
| 17:00 | Hamidi 5' | Report | | Stadium: 8 May 1945 Stadium; Referee: Ayoub Belhachemi |

| 6 December 2025 21 | CRB Tessala (5) | 0–0 (a.e.t.) (8–9 p) | JSM Béjaïa (3) | Sidi Bel Abbès |
| 14:00 | | Report | | Stadium: 24 February Stadium; Referee: Sahraoui Sasi |

| 4 December 2025 22 | WA Boufarik (3) | 3–0 | US Naama (3) | Boufarik |
| 14:00 | Ziani 15'; Benyoucef 72'; Faci 90+1' | Report | | Stadium: Mohamed Reggaz Stadium; Referee: Mohamed Beloufa |

| 6 December 2025 23 | NRB Beni Oulbane (2) | 0–1 | Amal Bou Saâda (3) | Beni Oulbane |
| 14:00 | | Report | Boutaiba 63' | Stadium: Hammou Boukouffa Stadium; Referee: Abdenacer Baatouche |

| 5 December 2025 24 | NA Hussein Dey (2) | 3–0 | IRB Sedrata (3) | Dar El Beïda |
| 14:30 | Benchoucha 9'; Touahria 54'; Kedadra 74' | Report | | Stadium: Omar Benrabah Stadium; Referee: Mohamed Guerid |

| 6 December 2025 25 | WB Aïn Benian (3) | 2–1 | SC Mecheria (3) | Staouéli |
| 14:00 | Benziada 24'; Belmiloud 46' | Report | Douifi 75' (o.g.) | Stadium: Amar Hafnaoui Stadium; Referee: Zakaria Antar |

| 3 December 2025 26 | CR Belouizdad (1) | 2–1 (a.e.t.) | ORB Oued Fodda (3) | Baraki |
| 19:00 | Bekkour 17'; Meziane 91' | Report | Boukbouka 6' | Stadium: Nelson Mandela Stadium; Referee: Abdelali Ibrir |

| 6 December 2025 27 | JB Aïn Kercha (3) | 1–0 | CSSW Illizi (3) | Aïn Kercha |
| 14:00 | Bouhlessa 12' | Report | | Stadium: Amar Bouchouareb Stadium; Referee: Abderrahmane Sahraoui |

| 5 December 2025 28 | CR Béni Thour (2) | 1–1 (a.e.t.) (3–4 p) | ASM Oran (2) | Ouargla |
| 16:00 | Hadef 49' (pen.) | Report | Freifer 69' | Stadium: 18 February Stadium; Referee: Haitham Ghouti |

| 4 December 2025 29 | MC Alger (1) | 1–0 | MC El Bayadh (1) | Douéra |
| 19:00 | Benhaoua 12' | Report | | Stadium: Ali La Pointe Stadium; Referee: Tayeb Benyebka |

| 5 December 2025 30 | USM Khenchela (1) | 1–0 | MB Rouissat (1) | Khenchela |
| 14:30 | Oukil 15' | Report | | Stadium: Amar Hamam Stadium; Referee: Youcef Gamouh |

| 6 December 2025 31 | ES Ben Aknoun (1) | 2–0 | RA Aïn Defla (3) | Dar El Beïda |
| 14:00 | Tamimi 50'; Saâd 73' | Report | | Stadium: Omar Benrabah Stadium; Referee: Dhikra Houia |

| 4 December 2025 32 | ESF Bir El Ater (4) | 2–0 | DRB Kadiria (5) | Bir el Ater |
| 14:00 | Benothmane 54'; Rezkallah 65' | Report | | Stadium: El Fazea Loulbani Stadium; Referee: Abdelkrim Houmer |

== Round of 32 ==
The schedule of the round of 32 was published on 7 December 2025.

| 11 December 2025 33 | CA Batna (2) | 5–1 | ESM Koléa (2) | Batna |
| 14:00 | Abid 2', 66'; Abdoune 24'; Chaibi 31'; Benmerzoug 77' | Report | Bouhadja 57' | Stadium: 1 November 1954 Stadium; Referee: Djameleddine Zenati |

| 11 December 2025 34 | Paradou AC (1) | 2–0 | USF Constantine (3) | Kouba |
| 14:00 | Kermiche 4'; Soukkou 31' | Report | | Stadium: Mohamed Benhaddad Stadium; Referee: Dhikra Houia |

| 12 December 2025 35 | FCB Frenda (3) | 0–1 | ASO Chlef (1) | Frenda |
| 14:30 | | Report | Bekkouche 43' | Stadium: Mohamed Tahar Chaouch Stadium; Referee: Mehadji Tayeb Bouderbal |

| 11 December 2025 36 | MB Barika (3) | 1–2 | MC Saïda (2) | Barika |
| 14:00 | Merah 90+4' | Report | Amieur 38'; Benouis 40' | Stadium: Mohamed Ghalmi Stadium; Referee: Massinissa Serdjane |

| 12 December 2025 37 | USM El Harrach (2) | 1–0 | JS Kabylie (1) | Baraki |
| 16:30 | Bensaha 45' | Report | | Stadium: Nelson Mandela Stadium; Referee: Nabil Boukhalfa |

| 14 December 2025 38 | USM Alger (1) | 3–0 | MO Constantine (2) | Algiers |
| 19:00 | Ghacha 19', 59', 80' | Report | | Stadium: Stade du 5 Juillet; Referee: Tayeb Benyebka |

| 13 December 2025 39 | RC Arbaâ (2) | 0–1 | ES Mostaganem (1) | Blida |
| 14:00 | | Report | Mesmoudi 90' | Stadium: Brakni Brothers Stadium; Referee: Zouhir Mansari |

| 13 December 2025 40 | JS Saoura (1) | 2–0 | AS Khroub (2) | Béchar |
| 15:00 | Bentaleb 85', 88' | Report | | Stadium: 20 August 1955 Stadium; Referee: Mohamed Beloufa |

| 11 December 2025 41 | CS Constantine (1) | 3–0 | CR Témouchent (2) | Constantine |
| 17:00 | Dib 20'; Tahar 22'; Mouaki 56' | Report | | Stadium: Chahid Hamlaoui Stadium; Referee: Rafik Aouina |

| 12 December 2025 42 | US Béchar Djedid (2) | 0–4 | ES Sétif (1) | Béchar |
| 14:30 | | Report | Biramahire 6'; Djahnit 29'; Hamidi 77'; Bouchama 85' | Stadium: 20 August 1955 Stadium; Referee: Abderahmane Mohamed Belkebir |

| 11 December 2025 43 | JSM Béjaïa (3) | 4–1 | WA Boufarik (3) | Béjaïa |
| 14:00 | Gacem 1', 45+3'; Saker 57'; Zamoum 82' | Report | Mazouz 76' | Stadium: Maghrebi Unity Stadium; Referee: Alaa Bouab |

| 11 December 2025 44 | Amal Bou Saâda (3) | 0–1 | NA Hussein Dey (2) | Bou Saâda |
| 14:00 | | Report | Benchoucha 33' | Stadium: Mokhtar Abdelatif Stadium; Referee: Mohamed Hamadouche |

| 15 December 2025 45 | WB Aïn Benian (3) | 1–5 | CR Belouizdad (1) | Algiers |
| 19:00 | Benziada 56' | Report | Benguit 37'; Keddad 45+1'; Boussouar 65', 88', 90+3' | Stadium: Stade du 5 Juillet; Referee: Mohamed Chaoubi |

| 11 December 2025 46 | JB Aïn Kercha (3) | 0–2 | ASM Oran (2) | Aïn Kercha |
| 14:00 | | Report | Faktour 74'; Gasmi 78' | Stadium: Amar Bouchouareb Stadium; Referee: Hamza Bouslimani |

| 13 December 2025 47 | MC Alger (1) | 2–1 | USM Khenchela (1) | Douéra |
| 17:00 | Messoussa 6'; Bayazid 49' | Report | Djaouchi 11' | Stadium: Ali La Pointe Stadium; Referee: Yahia Dahar |

| 13 December 2025 48 | ES Ben Aknoun (1) | 2–0 | ESF Bir El Ater (4) | Dar El Beïda |
| 14:00 | Chahrour 52'; Zaouache 82' | Report | | Stadium: Omar Benrabah Stadium; Referee: Ayoub Belhachemi |

== Round of 16 ==
The schedule of the round of 16 was published on 16 December 2025.

| 15 January 2026 49 | CA Batna (2) | 3–3 (a.e.t.) (3–1 p) | Paradou AC (1) | Batna |
| 14:00 | Bourada 31'; Chaibi 45+2'; Benmerzoug 99' | Report | Ramdaoui 19'; Abdelkader 23'; Guidoum 94' | Stadium: 1 November 1954 Stadium; Referee: Tayeb Benyebka |
| | Penalties |
| | Benmerzoug (penalty scored); Boughachiche (penalty scored); Kherroubi (penalty scored) | | Ramdaoui (penalty missed); Badani (penalty missed); Bisker (penalty scored); Bouziani (penalty missed) |

| 16 January 2026 50 | ASO Chlef (1) | 0–1 | MC Saïda (2) | Chlef |
| 16:00 | | Report | Benouis 61' | Stadium: Mohamed Boumezrag Stadium; Referee: Bilal Bendjahene |

| 12 January 2026 51 | USM El Harrach (2) | 2–3 (a.e.t.) | USM Alger (1) | Baraki |
| 17:00 | Bechou 21'; Chouki 88' | Report | Loucif 6'; Likonza 71'; Ghacha 101' | Stadium: Nelson Mandela Stadium; Referee: Youcef Tayeb Bouderbal |

| 15 January 2026 52 | ES Mostaganem (1) | 0–2 | JS Saoura (1) | Chlef |
| 16:00 | | Report | Akacem 37'; Allaoui 80' | Stadium: Mohamed Boumezrag Stadium; Referee: Mohamed Chaoubi |

| 16 January 2026 53 | CS Constantine (1) | 2–1 (a.e.t.) | ES Sétif (1) | Constantine |
| 16:00 | Dib 45+7'; Bouzekri 111' | Report | Hamidi 19' | Stadium: Chahid Hamlaoui Stadium; Referee: Fateh Harkat |

| 17 January 2026 54 | JSM Béjaïa (3) | 3–0 | NA Hussein Dey (2) | Béjaïa |
| 14:00 | Saker 9', 38'; Gacem 89' | Report | | Stadium: Maghrebi Unity Stadium; Referee: Zouhir Mansari |

| 15 January 2026 55 | CR Belouizdad (1) | 3–0 | ASM Oran (2) | Algiers |
| 19:00 | Ouassa 3'; Belkhir 72'; Ben Hammouda 81' | Report | | Stadium: Stade du 5 Juillet; Referee: Ayoub Belhachemi |

| 13 January 2026 56 | MC Alger (1) | 1–0 (a.e.t.) | ES Ben Aknoun (1) | Douéra |
| 19:00 | Chahrour 96' (o.g.) | Report | | Stadium: Ali La Pointe Stadium; Referee: Tahar Boudjemaa |

== Quarter-finals ==
The schedule of the Quarter-finals was published on 23 January 2026.

| 4 March 2026 57 | CA Batna (2) | 1–0 | MC Saïda (2) | Batna |
| 22:00 | Benmerzoug 17' | Report | | Stadium: 1 November 1954 Stadium; Referee: Anes Azrine; VAR: Fateh Harkat |

| 4 March 2026 58 | USM Alger (1) | 1–0 | JS Saoura (1) | Algiers |
| 22:00 | Radouani 36' | Report | | Stadium: Stade du 5 Juillet; Referee: Akram Mechairia; VAR: Yahia Dahar |

| 3 March 2026 59 | CS Constantine (1) | 1–0 | JSM Béjaïa (3) | Constantine |
| 22:00 | Benchaira 90+11' | Report | | Stadium: Chahid Hamlaoui Stadium; Referee: Rafik Aouina; VAR: Alaa Bouab |

| 3 March 2026 60 | CR Belouizdad (1) | 3–2 (a.e.t.) | MC Alger (1) | Baraki |
| 22:00 | Ben Hammouda 17'; Khacef 46'; Laouafi 100' | Report | Ghezala 29' (pen.); Bangoura 90' | Stadium: Nelson Mandela Stadium; Referee: Tahar Boudjemaa; VAR: Youcef Taieb Bouderbal |

== Semi-finals ==
The schedule of the Semi-finals was published on 25 March 2026.

| 24 April 2026 61 | CA Batna (2) | 1–3 (a.e.t.) | USM Alger (1) | Batna |
| 18:00 | Guettout 40' | Report | Tendeng 12'; Bouderbala 99', 120+1' | Stadium: 1 November 1954 Stadium; Referee: Tayeb Benyebka; Video assistant referee: Youcef Taieb-Bouderbal |

| 24 April 2026 62 | CS Constantine (1) | 2–3 | CR Belouizdad (1) | Constantine |
| 21:00 | Dib 55'; Omoyele 90+7' | Report | Belhocini 17'; Ndiaye 58' (o.g.); Ben Hammouda 70' | Stadium: Chahid Hamlaoui Stadium; Referee: Alaa Bouab; VAR: Yahia Dahar |

== Final ==
| 30 April 2026 Final | USM Alger (1) | 2–1 | CR Belouizdad (1) | Baraki |
| 17:00 | Kamagaté 22'; Khaldi 44' | Report | Ouassa 62' | Stadium: Nelson Mandela Stadium; Attendance: 25,000; Referee: Akram Mechairia; Video assistant referee: Youcef Taieb-Bouderbal |

== Statistics ==
=== Top scorers ===
| Rank | Goalscorer | Club | Goals |
|---|---|---|---|
| 1 | (Algeria) Houssam Ghacha | USM Alger | 4 |
| 3 | (Algeria) Lofti Boussouar | CR Belouizdad | 3 |
| 3 | (Algeria) Seifeddine Bounaas | USF Constantine | 3 |
| 3 | (Algeria) Oussama Benouis | MC Saïda | 3 |
| 3 | (Algeria) Rayane Gacem | JSM Béjaïa | 3 |
| 3 | (Algeria) Abdelhalim Saker | JSM Béjaïa | 3 |
| 3 | (Algeria) Mounib Benmerzoug | CA Batna | 3 |
| 3 | (Tunisia) Mohamed Ali Ben Hammouda | CR Belouizdad | 3 |

Updated to games played on 30 April 2026.

== See also ==
- 2025–26 Algerian Ligue Professionnelle 1
- 2025–26 Algerian League 2
