= Salaheddine Bouziani =

Algerian footballer (born 2006)

Personal information
- Full name: Salaheddine Bouziani
- Date of birth: 21 January 2006 (age 20)
- Place of birth: Béchar, Algeria
- Height: 1.75 m (5 ft 9 in)
- Position: Midfielder

Team information
- Current team: USM Alger
- Number: 14

Youth career
- 2016–2019: USM Alger
- 2022–2024: Paradou AC

Senior career*
Years	Team	Apps	(Gls)
2024–2026	Paradou AC	32	(0)
2026–	USM Alger	0	(0)

International career^{‡}
2024–2025	Algeria U20	4	(0)
2026–	Algeria U23	1	(0)
- * Club domestic league appearances and goals as of 15 July 2026 ‡ National team caps and goals as of 27 March 2026

Salaheddine Bouziani (Arabic: صلاح الدين بوزياني; born 21 January 2006) is an Algerian footballer who plays as a midfielder for USM Alger in the Algerian Ligue Professionnelle 1.

== Career ==
Bouziani started his career at FAF Academy in Sidi Bel Abbès in 2021 before joining Paradou AC in 2022. On 6 October 2024, Bouziani made his debut with Paradou AC in 0–0 defeat against JS Kabylie.

In July 2026, he joined USM Alger.

== International career ==
In March 2026, Bouziani was called to the Algeria U23s for a friendly against D.R. Congo.

== Career statistics ==
=== Club ===
As of 10 September 2026

Club	Season	League			Cup		Continental		Other		Total	
Club	Season	Division	Apps	Goals	Apps	Goals	Apps	Goals	Apps	Goals	Apps	Goals
Paradou AC	2024–25	Ligue 1	12	0	1	0	—		—		13	0
Paradou AC	2025–26	Ligue 1	20	0	1	0	—		—		21	0
Paradou AC	Total		32	0	2	0	—		—		34	0
USM Alger	2026–27	Ligue 1	0	0	0	0	0 (Note: All appearance(s) in CAF Confederation Cup)	0	0 (Note: All appearances in Algerian Super Cup)	0	0	0
USM Alger	Total		0	0	0	0	0	0	0	0	0	0
Career total			32	0	2	0	0	0	0	0	34	0

== Honours ==
USM Alger

- CAF Super Cup: 2026
