= 2026 Algerian Super Cup =

MC Alger	USM Alger
Ligue 1	Algerian Cup
- Date: 2 January 2027

The 2026 Algerian Super Cup will be the 16th edition of the Algerian Super Cup, a football match contested by the winners of the Algerian Ligue Professionnelle 1 and Algerian Cup competitions. The match will be played on 2 January 2027 between 2025–26 Ligue 1 winners MC Alger and 2025–26 Algerian Cup winners USM Alger.

== Match details ==
2 January 2027
:

MC Alger	–	USM Alger

,

== See also ==
- 2025–26 Algerian Ligue Professionnelle 1
- 2025–26 Algerian Cup
