= Mohamed Ramdaoui =

Algerian footballer (born 2006)

Personal information
- Full name: Mohamed El Amine Ramdaoui
- Date of birth: 23 July 2005 (age 21)
- Place of birth: Tlemcen, Algeria
- Position: Striker

Team information
- Current team: USM Alger
- Number: 15

Youth career
- 2016–2019: Académie FAF
- 2021–2023: Paradou AC

Senior career*
Years	Team	Apps	(Gls)
2023–2026	Paradou AC	53	(13)
2026–	USM Alger	5	(5)

International career^{‡}
2024–2025	Algeria U20	4	(2)
2026–	Algeria U23	2	(1)
- * Club domestic league appearances and goals as of 31 October 2026 ‡ National team caps and goals as of 27 March 2026

Mohamed El Amine Ramdaoui (Arabic: محمد الأمين رمضاوي; born 23 Jauly 2005) is an Algerian footballer who plays as a Striker for USM Alger in the Algerian Ligue Professionnelle 1.

== Career ==
=== Paradou AC ===
Bouziani started his career at FAF Academy in Sidi Bel Abbès in 2021 before joining Paradou AC in 2022. On 13 April 2023, Ramdaoui made his debut with Paradou AC in 1–1 draw against CR Belouizdad. On 5 January 2024, he scored his first goal with Paradou AC in 4–1 win against US Souf.

=== USM Alger ===
On 8 August 2026, Mohamed El Amine Ramdaoui joined USM Alger from Paradou AC, signing a three-year contract running until 2029. According to press reports, the transfer fee was estimated at 150 million Algerian dinars, making it the most expensive transfer in the club's history. The move followed the collapse of negotiations with Russian club Baltika Kaliningrad, which had expressed interest in signing the young forward. On 4 September 2026, Ramdaoui made his debut with USM Alger in 0–0 draw against USM Khenchela. On 10 September 2026, he scored his first goal with USM Alger in 2–0 win against JS El Biar.

== International career ==
In September 2024, Ramdaoui was called to the Algeria U20s for a friendly against Tunisia.

In March 2026, Ramdaoui was called to the Algeria U23s for a friendly against D.R. Congo.

== Career statistics ==
=== Club ===
As of 31 October 2026

Club	Season	League			Cup		Continental		Other		Total	
Club	Season	Division	Apps	Goals	Apps	Goals	Apps	Goals	Apps	Goals	Apps	Goals
Paradou AC	2022–23	Ligue 1	1	0	0	0	—		—		1	0
Paradou AC	2023–24	Ligue 1	13	1	1	0	—		—		14	1
Paradou AC	2024–25	Ligue 1	13	2	2	0	—		—		15	2
Paradou AC	2025–26	Ligue 1	26	10	3	2	—		—		29	12
Paradou AC	Total		53	13	6	2	—		—		59	15
USM Alger	2026–27	Ligue 1	5	5	0	0	0 (Note: All appearance(s) in CAF Confederation Cup)	0	0 (Note: All appearances in Algerian Super Cup)	0	5	5
USM Alger	Total		0	0	0	0	0	0	0	0	0	0
Career total			53	13	6	2	0	0	0	0	59	15

== Honours ==
USM Alger

- CAF Super Cup: 2026
