= Hamdi Labidi =

Tunisian footballer

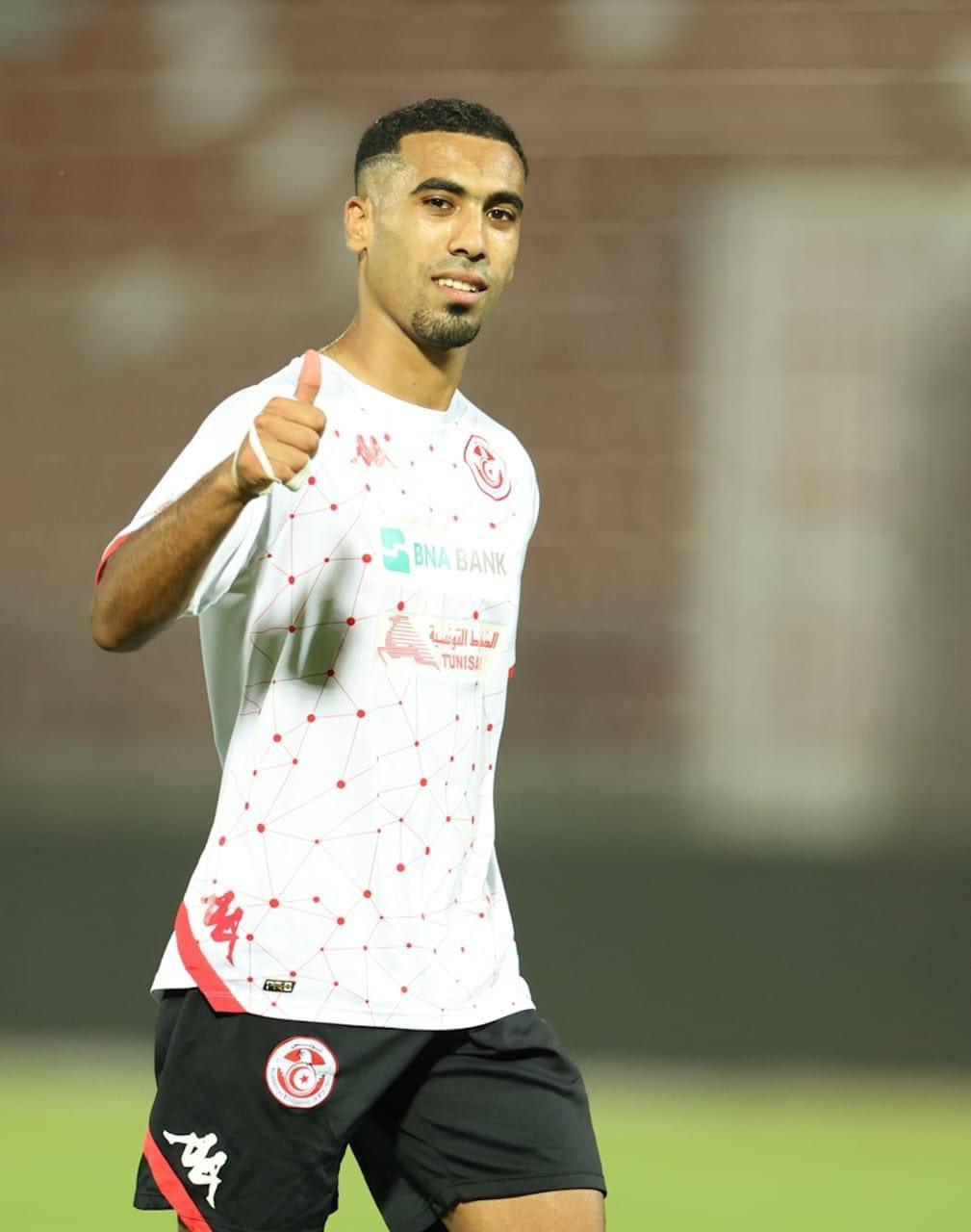

Personal information
- Date of birth: 9 June 2002 (age 24)
- Place of birth: Tunisia
- Height: 1.73 m (5 ft 8 in)
- Position: Forward

Team information
- Current team: ES Zarzis
- Number: 7

Youth career
- Club Africain

Senior career*
Years	Team	Apps	(Gls)
2020-2025	Club Africain	74	(13)
2025	Amanat Baghdad	6	(0)
2025-2026	Olympique Akbou	11	(2)
2026-	ES Zarzis	3	(1)

International career^{‡}
2021-	Tunisia U20	4	(0)
- * Club domestic league appearances and goals as of 22 September 2026 ‡ National team caps and goals as of 1 March 2021

Hamdi Labidi (Arabic: حَمْدِيّ الْعُبَيْدِيّ; born 9 June 2002) is a Tunisian professional footballer who plays for ES Zarzis.

== Club career ==
Hamdi Labidi made his professional debut for Club Africain on the 12 December 2020, starting as center forward in the Ligue Pro 1 against AS Rejiche. On 28 December 2025, he joined Algerian club Olympique Akbou. On 27 July 2026, he joined ES Zarzis.

== International career ==
With Tunisia U20, Labidi reached the U20 CAN semifinals in 2021.
