= Youssouf Dao =

Ivorian footballer

Personal information
- Full name: Youssouf Dao
- Date of birth: 5 March 1998 (age 28)
- Height: 1.77 m (5 ft 10 in)
- Position: Forward

Senior career*
Years	Team	Apps	(Gls)
2015–2016	ASEC Mimosas		
2016–2022	Sparta Prague B	0	(0)
2017–2018	→ Vlašim (loan)	32	(5)
2023–2024	MC Alger	15	(1)
2025–2026	Paradou AC	22	(1)

International career^{‡}
2019–	Ivory Coast U23	5	(2)
2021–	Ivory Coast Olympic	1	(0)
- * Club domestic league appearances and goals as of 28 January 2026 ‡ National team caps and goals as of 1 February 2020

Youssouf Dao (born 5 March 1998) is an Ivorian footballer who plays as a forward.

== Club career ==
On 21 August 2023, he joined MC Alger.

== International career ==
International with the under 23, he helped Ivory Coast qualify for the 2020 olympics in the U23 CAN, and he figured in the team of the tournament.
