= Ahmed Abdelkader (footballer, born 1999) =

French footballer

Personal information
- Date of birth: 19 February 1999 (age 27)
- Place of birth: Brest, France
- Height: 1.93 m (6 ft 4 in)
- Position: Goalkeeper

Youth career
- Pilier-Rouge
- Stade Brestois
- AS Brestoise
- 2015–2018: Guingamp

Senior career*
Years	Team	Apps	(Gls)
2018	Guingamp II	1	(0)
2018–2019	Polis Chrysochous	27	(0)
2019–2020	Sunderland	0	(0)
2020–2023	CR Belouizdad	12	(0)
2023–2024	US Biskra	7	(0)
2025–2026	Paradou AC	14	(0)
- * Club domestic league appearances and goals as of 5 June 2026

Ahmed Abdelkader (Arabic: أحمد عبدالقادر; born 19 February 1999) is an Algerian professional footballer who plays as a goalkeeper.

== Club career ==
Born in Brest, Abdelkader began his footballing career at the age of seven with local side Pilier-Rouge, where he played as a striker. He spent a year with professional side Stade Brestois, before moving to AS Brestoise, where he was converted to play as a goalkeeper due to his height. Having initially began training with them at the age of fourteen, Abdelkader signed with Guingamp in 2015.

Abdelkader made his Guingamp II league debut against Dinan Léhon on 6 January 2018. After three years with Guingamp, and one appearance for the club's reserve team in the Championnat National 3, Abdelkader was released by the club. Following his release, he went on trial with English side Leicester City, but after this was unsuccessful, he moved to Cyprus, signing a three-year deal with Polis Chrysochous. In his first season, he totalled twenty-nine appearances in all competitions.

Despite signing a three-year deal with Polis Chrysochous, he returned to England after one season, joining EFL League One side Sunderland, being assigned to the club's under-23 side. On joining, he stated that signing for Sunderland was "a simple decision to make", and that he had "a great chance to progress". Abdelkader made one appearance for Sunderland's U23 side, making his league debut against Reading U23s on 3 November 2019.

At the expiration of his one-year deal with Sunderland, Abdelkader moved to Algeria, signing with Belouizdad. He made his league debut against NC Magra on 23 July 2021. However, after just two seasons with the club, in which he featured in eleven games, he was linked with a loan move to JS Kabylie in August 2022.

After another full season with Belouizdad, Abdelkader moved to fellow Ligue 1 side US Biskra in September 2023. However, after only two weeks of training with his new team, he was left out of the squad for Biskra's match against Paradou AC due to issues with his registration. He start to play with Us Biskra in the second part of the Algerian league. He played 12 games with Biskra.

== Career statistics ==
=== Club ===
As of 13 March 2024

Appearances and goals by club, season and competition
Club	Season	League			National Cup		League Cup		Continental		Other		Total	
Club	Season	Division	Apps	Goals	Apps	Goals	Apps	Goals	Apps	Goals	Apps	Goals	Apps	Goals
Guingamp II	2017–18	Championnat National 3	1	0	–		–		–		0	0	1	0
Polis Chrysochous	2018–19	Cypriot Third Division	27	0	2 (Note: Appearances in the Cypriot Cup)	0	–		–		0	0	29	0
Sunderland	2019–20	League One	0	0	0	0	0	0	–		0	0	0	0
Belouizdad	2020–21	Ligue 1	3	0	0	0	0	0	0	0	0	0	3	0
Belouizdad	2021–22	Ligue 1	6	0	0	0	–		5 (Note: Appearances in the CAF Champions League)	0	0	0	11	0
Belouizdad	2022–23	Ligue 1	3	0	0	0	–		0	0	0	0	3	0
Belouizdad	2023–24	Ligue 1	0	0	0	0	–		0	0	1 (Note: Appearances in the Arab Club Champions Cup)	0	1	0
Belouizdad	Total		12	0	0	0	0	0	5	0	1	0	18	0
US Biskra	2023–24	Ligue 1	1	0	2 (Note: Appearances in the Algerian Cup)	0	–		–		0	0	3	0
Career total			41	0	4	0	0	0	5	0	1	0	51	0
