= Mohamed Benhaddad Stadium =

Multi-use stadium in Kouba, Algeria

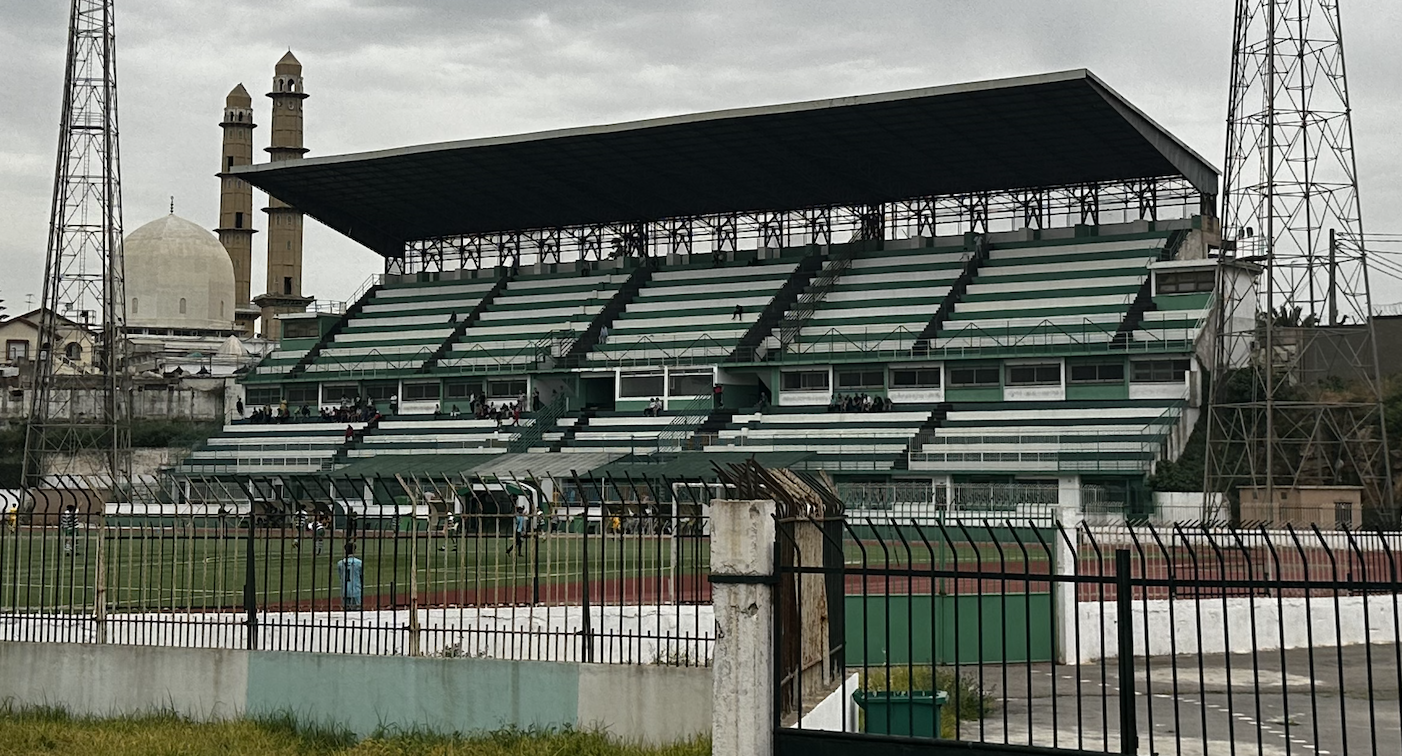
- Interactive map of Mohamed Benhaddad Stadium
- Location: Kouba, Algeria
- Coordinates: 36.7295°N 3.0905°E
- Capacity: 10,000
- Surface: Artificial turf

Tenants
- RC Kouba

Mohamed Benhaddad Stadium (Arabic: ملعب محمد بن حداد), is a multi-use stadium in Kouba, district of Algiers, Algeria. It is currently used mostly for football matches and is the home ground of RC Kouba. The stadium once was able to hold 15,000 to 20,000 fans, however, recent safety adjustments have lowered the capacity 10,000 people.
