= Mohamed Islam Abdelkader =

Algerian footballer (born 2004)

Personal information
- Full name: Mohamed Islam Abdelkader
- Date of birth: February 6, 2004 (age 22)
- Place of birth: Reghaïa, Algeria
- Position: Attacking midfielder

Team information
- Current team: MC Alger
- Number: 21

Youth career
- Paradou AC

Senior career*
| Years | Team | Apps | (Gls) |
| 2023–2026 | Paradou AC | 33 | (6) |
| 2026– | MC Alger | 4 | (0) |

International career^{‡}
| 2022 | Algeria U20 | 2 | (0) |
- * Club domestic league appearances and goals as of October 27, 2026 ‡ National team caps and goals as of October 27, 2026

Mohamed Islam Abdelkader (born February 6, 2004, in Reghaïa) is an Algerian footballer who plays for MC Alger in the Algerian Ligue Professionnelle 1.

== Career ==
In June 2026, Abdelkader joined MC Alger, signing a five-year contract.
