= 2025 Algerian Cup final =

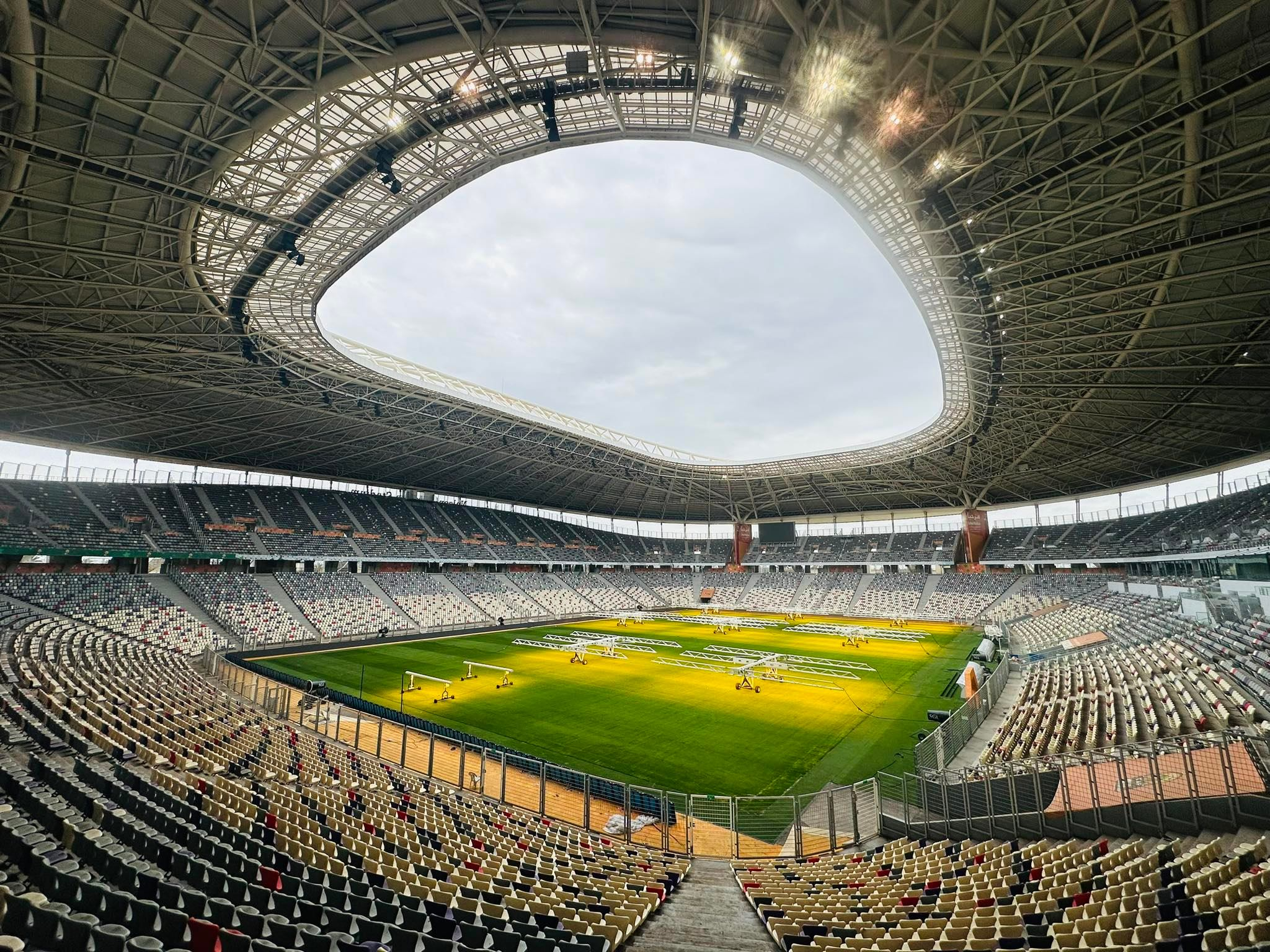
- Nelson Mandela Stadium hosted the final
- Event: 2024–25 Algerian Cup
| USM Alger | CR Belouizdad |
| 2 | 0 |
- Date: 5 July 2025
- Venue: Nelson Mandela Stadium, Baraki
- Referee: Yahia Dehar
- Attendance: 20,000
- Weather: Sunny; 29 °C (84 °F); 69% humidity

The 2025 Algerian Cup final was the 58th final of the Algerian Cup. The final was contested between holders CR Belouizdad and local rivals USM Alger. It was the sixth time that the two teams meet in the final, and the first since 2003. USM Alger claimed a 2–0 victory over CR Belouizdad in the Algerian Cup final with early goals from Benayad and Khaldi. The win secured their ninth Algerian Cup title and ended a long domestic trophy drought.

== Route to the final ==
=== USM Alger ===
USM Alger's route to the final
| Round | Opposition | Score |
|---|---|---|
| R64 | Olympique Magrane (H) | 6–0 |
| R32 | NC Magra (H) | 1–0 |
| R16 | RC Kouba (A) | 0–1 |
| QF | CR Témouchent (N) | 0–5 |
| SF | USM El Harrach (N) | 1–0 (a.e.t.) |
Key: (H) = Home venue; (A) = Away venue; (N) = Neutral venue

On January 16, 2025, USM Alger advanced to the Round of 32 with an emphatic 6–0 victory over Olympique Magrane at the Stade du 5 Juillet. Mohamed Ben Mazouz opened the scoring with a header in the 31st minute, followed by Khaled Bousseliou adding a second five minutes later, capitalizing on a major error by goalkeeper Lakhal. In the second half, Ben Mazouz returned to the spotlight, scoring in the 71st minute to put his team in a commanding position. Salim Boukhanchouche made it 4–0 just two minutes later. Toward the end of the game, Ben Mazouz completed his hat-trick in the 85th minute, and substitute Mahrouz sealed the attacking display in stoppage time (90+2). In the next round, USM Alger faced NC Magra, securing a narrow 1–0 win thanks to a goal from Ismail Belkacemi in the 46th minute.

On March 11, 2025, during a Ramadan evening, USMA booked their place in the quarter-finals with a hard-fought 1–0 victory over RC Kouba, courtesy of a penalty converted by Mehdi Merghem. In the quarter-finals, USMA delivered a dominant 5–0 performance against CR Témouchent at the Miloud Hadefi Stadium. Ahmed Khaldi opened the scoring in the 23rd minute with a thunderous 30-meter strike. Ben Mazouz doubled the lead in the 43rd minute, finishing a cross from Merghem. In the second half, Khaldi added his second goal in the 66th minute with a delicate chip over the goalkeeper following a brilliant assist from Brahim Benzaza. Just four minutes later, Ben Mazouz scored again, taking advantage of a cross from Houssam Ghacha. Ghacha himself completed the rout in the 90th minute, firing into the top corner after a delivery from Haithem Loucif.

On April 15, 2025, USM Alger secured a place in the Algerian Cup final after a tense 1–0 extra-time win over USM El Harrach. In a tightly contested match with few clear opportunities in regular time, the decisive goal came in the 105th minute, when Adam Alilet converted a penalty. USMA held firm in the remaining minutes to book their spot in the final.

=== CR Belouizdad ===
CR Belouizdad's route to the final
| Round | Opposition | Score |
|---|---|---|
| R64 | CR Zaouia (H) | 1–0 |
| R32 | MC Alger (H) | 1–0 |
| R16 | US Chaouia (H) | 4–2 |
| QF | MO Béjaïa (N) | 1–0 |
| SF | MC El Bayadh (N) | 1–0 |
Key: (H) = Home venue; (A) = Away venue; (N) = Neutral venue

On January 7, 2025, CR Belouizdad, the defending champions of the Algerian Cup, secured their place in the Round of 32 with a narrow 1–0 victory over CR Zaouia, a team from the Inter-Régions Division. The match took place at the Stade du 5 Juillet, where Hedy Chaâbi scored the lone goal of the game in the 43rd minute, sealing the win for CR Belouizdad and ensuring their progression to the next stage. On February 20, 2025, CR Belouizdad got their revenge on MC Alger with a 1–0 win in the Round of 32, just a week after losing to the same opponent in the Super Cup. Right before halftime, Aymen Mahious broke the deadlock with a moment of brilliance. After a long clearance from Houcine Benayada, the striker pressured Ayoub Ghezala, won the ball with a header, slipped between two defenders, and finished with his left foot in the 45+2nd minute. CR Belouizdad held on to the lead and sealed the win, securing their spot in the Round of 16.

Where they faced US Chaouia in a high-scoring encounter. The match began with a shock as Hamza Mellouk gave US Chaouia the lead in just the 6th minute, sparking hopes of a major upset. But the ever-reliable Aymen Mahious had other plans, netting a stunning hat-trick in just 30 minutes. He first equalized in the 35th minute, and shortly after the break, a shove by Khanyisa Mayo in the box earned CRB a penalty, which Mahious calmly converted to make it 2–1 in the 52nd minute. Just over ten minutes later, the same duo struck again Khacef with the assist and Mahious with a well-placed header to complete his hat-trick in 65th minute. US Chaouia pulled one back through Abdelouahab in the 83rd minute, his shot hitting the post before crossing the line. But any hope of a comeback was dashed three minutes later when Boussouar headed in CRB’s fourth goal from yet another Naoufel Khacef cross 86th minute. In the quarter-finals, CR Belouizdad faced MO Béjaïa at the Hocine Aït Ahmed Stadium. Mayo scored the only goal of the match in the 55th minute, securing CR Belouizdad's place in the semi-finals for the 16th time in its history. CR Belouizdad booked their spot in a 14th Algerian Cup final with a 1–0 win over MC El Bayadh, thanks to a goal from Meziane. Despite dominating the game, they struggled to convert their chances. This marks their fourth consecutive final an all-time record. The dream of a historic 10th cup title is now within reach.

== Pre-match ==
The clash between USM Alger and CR Belouizdad in the Algerian Cup final carried a historic and highly anticipated significance, as it marked the sixth time the two teams met in the final, and the first time since 2003. USM Alger reached the final for the 18th time after defeating USM El Harrach in the derby in extra time, with the only goal scored by Adam Alilet. This marked their first final appearance since 2013, as they aimed to secure their ninth title. Meanwhile, CR Belouizdad, the defending champions, defeated MC El Bayadh, the competition’s surprise package, at the Miloud Hadefi Stadium with a single goal scored by Abderrahmane Meziane. They had reached the final for the fourth consecutive time as they pursued their tenth title. The match represented not only a battle for the cup, but also a contest for prestige and historical supremacy, with both clubs close in total titles and having delivered strong performances in recent years.

The Algerian Football Federation (FAF) announces that the 2025 Mobilis Algerian Cup Final will be played on July 5, 2025, at the Nelson Mandela Stadium. The kick-off is scheduled for 5:00 p.m. In preparation for this event, a technical meeting will be held on June 29, 2025, at 11:00 a.m. at the FAF headquarters, in the presence of representatives from both finalist clubs, match officials, and organizers. USM Alger will be supported by a familiar face in the lead-up to the Algerian Cup final: Rolland Courbis, the coach who guided the club to the title in 2013. Invited to Algiers for the match, Courbis won’t hold any official position, but will act as an informal advisor, offering his experience and motivational support to the team. “I’ll tell them two or three things this week we’ll see if I bring them luck,” Courbis said on L'Équipe. His presence brings both symbolic value and tactical insight to a USMA side aiming to lift the trophy once again.

=== Broadcasting ===
Algerian Television holds the broadcasting rights for the final match on its channels, TV1 (Arabic), TV2 (French), TV4 (Tamazight), and TV6. As for radio, the match will be broadcast on Radio 1, Radio 2, and Radio 3.

=== Match officials ===
On July 2, 2025, The Federal Arbitration Commission of the (FAF) named Yahia Dehar as the referee for the final, including assistant referees Hocine Hadj Yahia and Anouar Ghazli. Tahar Boudjemaa served as the fourth official, Islem Boukhatem will serve as the reserve assistant referee. while Fateh Harkat acted as the Video assistant referee. Daoud Houari were appointed as assistant VAR officials.

== Match ==
=== Summary ===
USM Alger wasted no time asserting themselves. Just nine minutes into the match, Khaldi pounced on a loose ball from Youcef Laouafi and quickly played it to Brahim Benzaza, who delivered a perfect pass to Riad Benayad. Positioned ideally in the box, Benayad made no mistake and opened the scoring. Only four minutes later, Adam Alilet surged forward and delivered a precise through ball to Khaldi, who coolly slotted past Moustapha Zeghba to double the lead. Faced with an early two-goal deficit, CRB coach Sead Ramović reacted swiftly by making two substitutions in the 19th minute, bringing on Rezki Hamroune and Abderrahmane Bekkour for Mohamed Islam Belkhir and Laouafi.

With the advantage secured, USMA shifted their approach, dropping slightly deeper and relying more on counter attacks. Meanwhile, CR Belouizdad pushed to get back into the game but struggled to create real chances. Their only significant opportunity in the first half came in stoppage time (45+4’) when Chouaib Keddad’s header from a corner was safely caught by goalkeeper Oussama Benbot. The score remained 2–0 as the referee Dahar sent both teams to the dressing rooms at halftime. The second half saw the pace of the match slow down considerably. USM Alger remained compact and disciplined, avoiding unnecessary risks and focusing on preserving their lead through structured defense and quick breaks.

Despite additional substitutions by Ramović most notably bringing on Chaâbi and Benahmed CRB found it difficult to break down the organized USMA defense. The Red and Black remained in control, showing composure and tactical maturity. The referee added nine minutes of stoppage time, but CR Belouizdad could not find a breakthrough. The final whistle confirmed USMA’s 2–0 win. With this result, USM Alger lifts the Algerian Cup for the ninth time in its history, following a final they dominated from start to finish. The win ends a years-long wait for a major domestic trophy.

=== Details ===
5 July 2025
17:00

| USM Alger | 2–0 | CR Belouizdad |
|---|---|---|
| Benayad 9'; Khaldi 13' | Report |

Nelson Mandela Stadium, Baraki
Attendance: 20,000
Referee: Yahia Dehar

| USM Alger | CR Belouizdad |

| GK | 25 | (Algeria) Oussama Benbot |
| CB | 21 | (Algeria) Adam Alilet (c) |
| CB | 5 | (Algeria) Imadeddine Azzi | (yellow card) 61' | (substituted off) 71' |
| RB | 2 | (Algeria) Rayane Mahrouz | | (substituted off) 83' |
| LB | 23 | (Algeria) Ilyes Chetti |
| DM | 8 | (Algeria) Islam Merili | | (substituted off) 71' |
| DM | 14 | (Algeria) Brahim Benzaza |
| DM | 18 | (Algeria) Salim Boukhanchouche |
| LW | 27 | (Algeria) Houssam Ghacha |
| RW | 29 | (Algeria) Ahmed Khaldi | | (substituted off) 78' |
| ST | 28 | (Algeria) Riad Benayad | | (substituted off) 71' |
Substitutes:
| GK | 16 | (Algeria) Kamel Soufi |
| LB | 15 | (Algeria) Nabil Lamara |
| RB | 17 | (Algeria) Haithem Loucif | | (substituted on) 71' |
| RB | 19 | (Algeria) Saâdi Radouani | | (substituted on) 71' |
| DM | 6 | (Algeria) Oussama Chita |
| AM | 11 | (Democratic Republic of the Congo) Glody Likonza | | (substituted on) 83' |
| LW | 12 | (Algeria) Khaled Bousseliou | | (substituted on) 71' |
| RW | 30 | (Algeria) Mehdi Merghem | | (substituted on) 78' |
| RW | 51 | (Algeria) Diaa Eddine Mechid |
Manager :
(Algeria) Mohamed Lacet

| GK | 1 | (Algeria) Moustapha Zeghba |
| CB | 2 | (Algeria) Chouaib Keddad |
| CB | 21 | (Algeria) Youcef Laouafi | (substituted off) 19' |
| RB | 3 | (Algeria) Houcine Benayada |
| LB | 24 | (Algeria) Naoufel Khacef |
| DM | 8 | (Algeria) Raouf Benguit (c) |
| DM | 29 | (Algeria) Bilal Boukerchaoui | (substituted off) 83' |
| LW | 11 | (Algeria) Abderrahmane Meziane |
| RW | 19 | (Algeria) Mohamed Islam Belkhir | (substituted off) 19' |
| ST | 9 | (South Africa) Khanyisa Mayo | (substituted off) 46' |
| ST | 18 | (Algeria) Aymen Mahious |
Substitutes:
| GK | 30 | (Algeria) Farid Chaâl |
| CB | 5 | (Algeria) Badreddine Souyad |
| CB | 28 | (Algeria) Abderrahmane Bekkour | (substituted on) 19' |
| DM | 15 | (Algeria) Housseyn Selmi |
| DM | 23 | (Cameroon) Jacques Mbé |
| CM | 26 | (Ivory Coast) Arafat Doumbia |
| DM | 48 | (Algeria) Zineddine Benhamed | (substituted on) 46' |
| RW | 7 | (Algeria) Hedy Chaabi | (substituted on) 83' |
| RW | 22 | (Algeria) Rezki Hamroune | (substituted on) 19' |
Manager :
(Germany) Sead Ramović

Assistant referees:
Hocine Hadj Yahia
Anouar Ghazli
Fourth official:
Tahar Boudjemaa
Reserve referee:
Islem Boukhatem
Video assistant referee:
Fateh Harkat
Assistant video assistant referees:
Daoud Houari

Match rules
- 90 minutes
- 30 minutes of extra time if necessary
- Penalty shoot-out if scores still level
- Seven named substitutes
- Maximum of five substitutions, with a sixth allowed in extra time (Note: Each team was given only three opportunities to make substitutions, with a fourth opportunity in extra time, excluding substitutions made at half-time, before the start of extra time and at half-time in extra time.)
