= 2024–25 USM Alger season =

USM Alger
2024–25 season
- Owner: Groupe SERPORT
- President: Athmane Sehbane (from 22 June 2024) (until 10 May 2025); Boubekeur Abid (from 10 May 2025)
- Head coach: Nabil Maâloul (from 13 July 2024) (until 12 February 2025); Marcos Paquetá (from 16 February 2025) (until 28 April 2025); Sofiane Ben Khalifa (c) (from 29 April 2025) (until 4 May 2025); Mohamed Lacet (c) (from 5 May 2025)
- Stadium: Stade du 5 Juillet; Nelson Mandela Stadium
- Ligue 1: 7th
- Algerian Cup: Winners
- Confederation Cup: Quarter-finals
- Top goalscorer: League: Houssam Ghacha (6 goals); All: Ismaïl Belkacemi (10 goals)
Home colours

The 2024–25 season, is USM Alger's 47th season and the club's 30th consecutive season in the top flight of Algerian football. In addition to the domestic league, USM Alger are participating in this season's editions of the Algerian Cup and the Confederation Cup. On June 27, 2024, The federal office approved the calendar for the 2024–25 Ligue 1 season with the aim of ending on May 31, 2025. The first round is scheduled for September 14, this delay is motivated both by an extended end of the 2023–24 season but also by the holding of early presidential elections which will take place on September 7, 2024. However, the Ligue de Football Professionnel decided to postpone the start of the Ligue 1 by a week, on September 21.

== Review ==
=== Background ===
After great pressure from supporters demanding a radical change within the club's administrative organization. At the management level, the advisor to the chairman of the Board of Directors, Réda Abdouch, submitted his resignation, justifying his decision by "personal and health reasons", indicated the club. Previously USM Alger announced the appointment of Sid Ali Yahiaoui as new general secretary. This is a homecoming for Yahiaoui, who had already held this position in the past with the club in 2021. On June 22, 2024, The Board of Directors of USMA/SSPA met at the headquarters of the Groupe SERPORT, where it was decided to appoint Athmane Sehbane, chairman of the Board of Directors of USM Alger, to succeed Kamel Hassena who resigned from his position. Still in the same vein, SERPORT has chosen the former Rouge et Noir player, Hamza Koudri as sports coordinator while the former captain of L'USMA, Billel Dziri will occupy the position of sports director. The next day, Othmane Sohbane appointed Mustapha Laroussi as secretary of the first team. Laroussi previously held this position in USM Alger. Arriving in the baggage of the new president of the club, Dziri has already thrown in the towel as sports director of USMA.

After the departure of Juan Carlos Garrido, USM Alger studied several avenues to find the successor of the Spanish technician. In an official press release on July 13, USM Alger announced the signing of Tunisian coach Nabil Maâloul a contract of two seasons, Maâloul who has extensive experience in Africa will now have his first experience in Algeria. Following urgent requests from certain clubs, the Algerian Football Federation has decided to increase the number of foreign players in the Ligue 1. After having formally passed through the technical college chaired by Rabah Saâdane, the FAF ratified the increase in the number of foreigners per club from 3 to 5. However, that there is a provision intended to serve as a safeguard for the license of a foreign player or coach to be validated, the club must pay the federation a deposit equivalent to 12 months salary. This is to protect against any financial dispute. On August 5, 2024, USM Alger appointed former player Rabie Meftah as coach of the under-21 team. Meftah expressed his happiness to return to a club dear to him and start his new mission with the young players.

=== Pre-season ===
After more than 40 days of rest, on July 26, USM Alger players return to training to begin their off-season preparation. The Tunisian technician have about a month and a half to properly prepare his team with a view to returning to official competition from September. The resumption session is scheduled at the annex of Nelson Mandela Stadium, as revealed by Maâloul this stadium will be the team's new training camp this season. Soustara team will carry out the first cycle of preparation in Baraki for two weeks, where the technical staff will focus on the physical aspect. On August 14, USM Alger set off for Annaba, from where it reach the Tunisian border town of Tabarka. A place chosen by the team's technical staff to hold the second stage of summer preparation, after a successful first training camp in Algiers under the orders of Maâloul. Les Rouge et Noir will play a few friendly matches against Tunisian opponents and those from other countries. USM Alger play five friendly matches as part of its pre-competitive training camp in Tunisia, including four against Algerian teams, who are also there for their pre-season training camps, the Red and Black management announced in a press release.

On August 23, Secretary General Sid Ali Yahiaoui submitted his resignation due to a misunderstanding with the chairman of the Board of Directors Athmane Sehbane, because of his repeated mistakes in filling out new player contracts. The management transferred the former member of the media cell Badreddine Jaafar to administrative duties along with the director of the general administration Mohamed Briki and the secretary Mustapha Laroussi. On August 31, USMA completed a 16-day training camp in Tabarka, Tunisia, as part of its off-season preparation. This gathering, dedicated to the technical-tactical and organizational aspects, saw the team play 6 friendly matches: 3 against Algerian clubs, 2 against Tunisian clubs and one match against a Libyan club.

==== First-team transfers (summer transfer window) ====
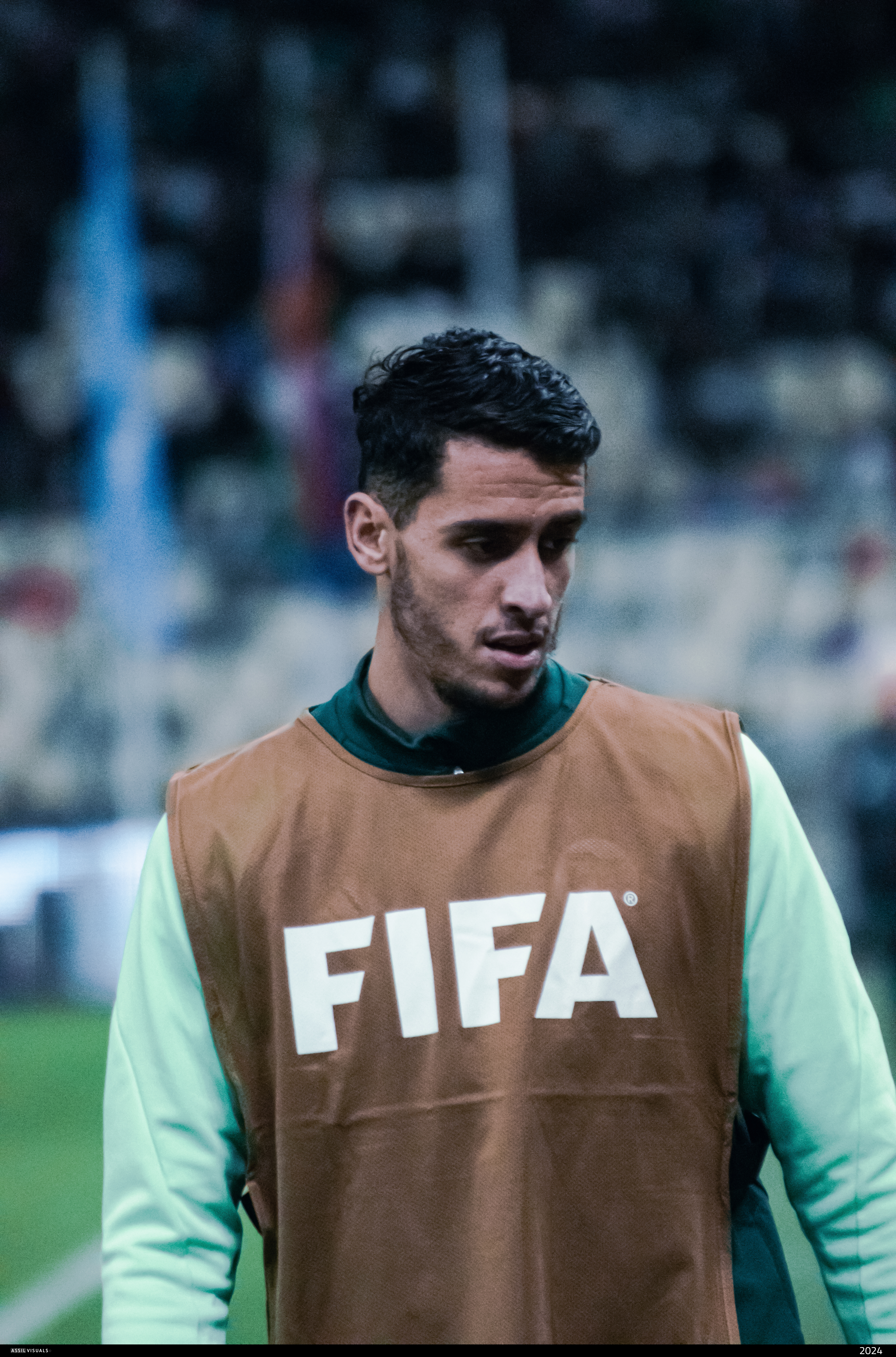
Zineddine Belaïd joins Belgian club Sint-Truiden in a deal amounting to 500,000 euros.

Before Kamel Hassena's administration left, the contracts of Abdessamed Bounacer and Salim Boukhanchouche were renewed for two seasons, and Abdelkrim Namani's renewed for four seasons. As for Hocine Dehiri whose loan period ended, his contract was bought from Paradou AC, where he signed a contract for three seasons. On June 23, 2024, Zineddine Belaïd met with Athmane Sehbane, where he agreed that he would officially leave. The team's management finally agreed not to put obstacles in the way of the player's ambition and in a way that preserves the rights of the club. The agreement was finally concluded to fulfill the desire of Belaïd to join the Belgian club Sint-Truiden and signed his exit paper.

On July 8, 2024, USM Alger has its first summer recruit the defender Ilyes Chetti, after the termination of his contract with the Wydad AC, Where he signed a contract for three seasons for an astronomical total salary exceeding 6 million DA. In the sights of several Algerian clubs in this transfer window, Houssam Ghacha finally joined USM Alger for three seasons, coming from Espérance de Tunis. On July 23, USM Alger announced the recruitment of two Congolese players from TP Mazembe, Kévin Mondeko and Glody Likonza. Although he was also called up by CS Constantine, Mondeko has signed a two-season contract with the Rouge et Noir, while Likonza has signed for a period of three seasons. The Egyptian Zamalek SC and the Club Africain of Tunis tried to offer the services of the vice-captain of TP Mazembe, but the USMA was quicker in materializing with Likonza, while he was expected in Tunis to finalize his contract with the most popular club in Tunisia.

On July 24, Al Sadd announced its official contract with Abdessamed Bounacer for a period of five years. Although he renewed his contract for two seasons, rumors of Bounacer's departure have increased since the beginning of the transfer market. Where Bounacer moved to Qatar with his agent to negotiate his transfer to Al Sadd. Where Bounacer has a release clause in his contract, which amounts to 500,000 euros. On July 27, USM Alger announced the arrival of the Algerian left winger Ghiles Guenaoui, as the fifth player to join the club during the summer coming from the Al Masry SC. The Egyptian club's management approved the offer submitted to obtain Guenaoui’ services on a permanent transfer, after paying the agreed financial value. On August 6, USM Alger signed a contract with Nigerian Wale Musa Alli for two seasons coming from Zbrojovka Brno. The Ligue de Football Professionnel has demanded proof from USM Alger that Musa Alli has international status with at least five caps for his country, as provided for in the general regulations of the FAF. In the absence of this validation, the player will not be able to be integrated into the Red and Black squad.

With the departures of Belaïd and Bounacer, USM Alger has recruited new central defender Imadeddine Azzi for a season on loan from Kuwaiti club Kazma. On August 13, the management of USM Alger and Simba of Tanzania agreed on the transfer of Cameroonian Leonel Ateba in a deal worth 250 thousand euros. On August 23, Hispanic-Senegalese Sekou Gassama signed a two-year electronic contract, coming from Anorthosis Famagusta. His arrival comes after the departure of three foreigners, Malians Kanou and Konaté as well as Cameroonian Ateba. On the morning of August 27, USM Alger announced the signing of Bolivian international Adalid Terrazas for three seasons as the fifth foreigner. Terrazas became the first player from South America to join the club since 2009. The Soustara club finally managed to find a solution with some of its players that Nabil Maâloul does not see as being able to continue the adventure with the Red and Black. This is the case of the Malian duo Sékou Konaté and Abdoulaye Kanou that USM Alger has definitively removed from the squad. The first was released by signing an amicable agreement while the second was transferred to the Moroccan club Difaâ El Jadidi. In addition to this duo, Sehbane's management has reached an agreement with striker Oussama Bellatreche. Arriving in winter from JS Saoura, Belatreche signed an amicable separation.

=== Start of season ===
On September 12, USM Alger headed to Tunisia to play their first match of the season in the CAF Confederation Cup against Stade Tunisien. Having dominated most of the match, the Usmistes were unable to find the back of the opposing net. The Tunisians surprised the Red and Blacks in the 85th minute with a goal scored by Smaali. In second leg match, USM Alger hosted Stade Tunisien at the Miloud Hadefi Stadium in Oran, USM Alger did not open the score due to the defensive way the opponent played, and waited until the last quarter to open the score, through defender Kévin Mondeko with a superb acrobatic return. The deliverance came following a corner taken by Ghiles Guenaoui at the near post, Stade Tunisien striker Bilel Mejri put the ball in his own net in stoppage time. After this goal, the referee of the match will end the debate, allowing USMA to qualify for the group stage for the third time in a row.

October 8, 2024 The disciplinary jury of the Confederation of African Football (CAF) has delivered its verdict in the USM Alger-RS Berkane case. More than five months later, the disciplinary jury has finally delivered its verdict concerning the famous CAF Confederation Cup semi-finals case, it imposed a financial sanction of $40,000 against the Soustara club, for non-compliance with the decisions and regulations of the CAF bodies. On October 31, 2024, USM Alger announced news of its training center under construction, which was relaunched this season. However, after the construction works for the buildings were carried out, the site remained in a state of disrepair again for a little over a year. Cosider is the company responsible for the project, the delivery date of which has not been set. Project director said regular meetings have been held with President Sahebane since he took office. Since July, we have made significant progress, overcoming many obstacles thanks to the efforts of the project's design office.

==== First-team transfers (winter transfer window) ====
In the winter transfer period, Sekou Gassama was the first to leave after agreeing to terminate the contract. After that, Hocine Dehiri and Omar Embarek left on loan to Qadsia SC of Kuwait and ES Mostaganem until the end of the season. On January 30, the USM Alger club announced the termination of its contract with Mohamed Ait El Hadj. After playing for the club's for three years, his contract was terminated a year and a half before the end of his contract. At the end of the winter transfer window in Algeria, USM Alger announced the departure of Ismail Belkacemi to Al Ahli Tripoli for $450,000, according to what the club announced. The first deal in the winter transfer period was striker Ahmed Khaldi for two and a half years, coming from Al-Arabi SC of Kuwait after terminating his contract.

In late January, USM Alger signed two other strikers, Riad Benayad from Espérance de Tunis for one year and Mehdi Merghem from Farense for two and a half years. This is a qualitative reinforcement to the attacking line of the Red and Black. On February 5, a few hours before the transfer window closed, USM Alger signed a fourth player in the person of Haithem Loucif. The right back, who already played for two years at USM Alger between 2021 and 2023, is making his return after a fairly average stint in Switzerland. Burundian international Bonfils-Caleb Bimenyimana has finally been qualified by the LFP. Who was signed after the end of his contract with Zob Ahan. His signature was validated in the very last hours of the transfer window but it took 15 days for the player status committee of FAF to make a final decision on his case. Bimenyimana signed a one-year contract with USM Alger.

=== Season run in ===
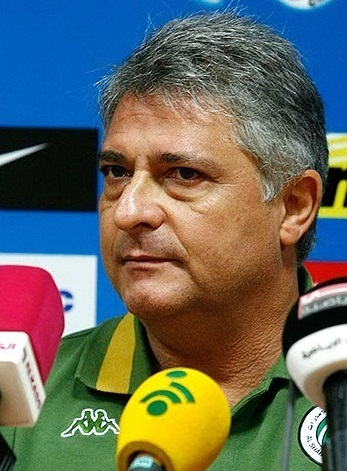
Marcos Paquetá succeeds Nabil Maâloul as new coach.

After there was an agreement to terminate the contract between USM Alger and Nabil Maâloul, the latter retracted his decision and appointed a lawyer who sent a letter to the club. The cooperation with Maâloul was scheduled to end after the cup match against NC Magra, although Maâloul had a very good season and remained in contention for all competitions, the defeat in the Algiers Derby made voices rise among the fans demanding his departure. On February 13, 2025, USM Alger officially announced the end of its cooperation with the Tunisian coach and his technical staff after the agreement between Sehbane and Maâloul to leave with compensation of three months salary, even though his contract provided for the possibility of unilateral termination in exchange for compensation of two months salary. On February 16, USM Alger has announced the appointment of Brazilian Marcos Paquetá as technical coach until the end of the season and will be accompanied in his work by the translator Abdelrazak Loulmi, also the return of Belaïd Medjahed as a physical trainer.

On February 24, 2025, after being re-elected as president of the Algerian Football Federation (FAF) for a second term, Walid Sadi stated his desire to end of USM Alger v RS Berkane case quickly: “ We hope that the final decision of the Court of Arbitration for Sport (CAS) will be taken before the end of March ”. On February 26, The CAS has admitted the appeal of the FAF against the Confederation of African Football (CAF), the Royal Moroccan Football Federation (FRMF) and RS Berkane concerning the validation of the RS Berkane jerseys on which appears a map of Morocco including Western Sahara. On March 2, USM Alger announced that Saber Bensmain had joined the technical staff as Paquetá's first assistant. On March 4, USM Alger announced the appointment of former team player Hamza Aït Ouamar as the club's general manager. On March 7, former USM Alger striker Tarek Hadj Adlane was appointed as the club's spokesperson. This appointment is part of the club's recent changes to its technical and administrative staff.

On March 30, A few days before facing CS Constantine in the CAF Confederation Cup quarter-finals, the CAF Disciplinary Committee imposed a hefty fine of $200,000 on the club. This follows the use of smoke bombs during the ASEC Mimosas match, played on January 5 in Abidjan. The Disciplinary Committee considered this as a violation of laws 82 and 83 of the disciplinary code. In addition, another fine of $25,000 was imposed for similar incidents that occurred during the match against ASC Jaraaf. On April 9, 2025, USM Alger failed to reach the semi-finals of the CAF Confederation Cup after losing to CS Constantine on penalties. Therefore, there will be no revenge on the field between USM Alger and RS Berkane after the events of last season. Far from dwelling on this premature exit, Paquetá pointed out that the season is far from over for USMA. "Now, we still have two goals in mind, the Algerian Cup and a podium finish in the Ligue 1".

On April 28, 2025, USM Alger's officially terminated the contract of coach Marcos Paquetá. Despite leading the team to the final of the Algerian Cup, the club cited insufficient sporting results as the main reason for his dismissal. However, behind the scenes, sources suggest that financial issues also played a major role. Tensions reportedly arose over salary matters and contractual adjustments involving the players. It's believed that Paquetá may have either sided with the players in salary disputes or clashed with the club's board over how these financial issues were being handled.

=== New Era Begins as Saïd Allik Returns to Take Charge ===
On April 30, 2025, the Algerian Minister of Transport Saïd Sayoud, dismissed Mohamed-Karim Eddine Harkati from his position as CEO of Groupe SERPORT, the official majority shareholder of USM Alger, and appointed Abdelkrim Rezzal as his interim replacement. On May 10, 2025, Athmane Sahbane has officially stepped down as president of the USMA board after less than a year, due to poor management and unmet goals. Boubekeur Abid, an engineer with extensive experience in various sectors, has been appointed as his successor. The club's owner, facilitated the leadership change through a board meeting, with the Algerian Cup now the last hope to salvage the season.

On May 12, 2025, Minister of Transport Saïd Sayoud received the Chairman of USM Alger Boubekeur Abid, accompanied by board members, a representative of the Groupe SERPORT, and Saïd Allik. During the meeting, the Minister reaffirmed his full support for the club, praising Allik's experience and the golden era he spent with USMA. Sayoud also stressed the urgent need to complete the club's training center, calling it a cornerstone for the team's future revival. For the first time since his return, Saïd Allik spoke publicly about the current situation at USMA, the experienced leader acknowledged the scale of the task while remaining optimistic: "It's not easy to take over a club with only five matches left in the season, especially with all the problems there are. But things can change. We need to be patient. I hope that within two years, USMA will come back strong."

== Squad list ==
Players and squad numbers last updated on 5 July 2025.
Note: Flags indicate national team as has been defined under FIFA eligibility rules. Players may hold more than one non-FIFA nationality.

No.	Nat.	Name	Position	Date of birth (age)	Signed in	Contract ends	Signed from	Apps	Goals	Transfer fees
Goalkeepers
1	(Algeria)	Abdelmoumen Sifour	GK	3 March 1998 (aged 26)	2023	2025	(Algeria) RC Arbaâ	11	0	Free transfer
16	(Algeria)	Kamel Soufi	GK	5 June 1996 (aged 28)	2023	2027	(Algeria) MC Oran	24	0	Free transfer
25	(Algeria)	Oussama Benbot	GK	11 October 1994 (aged 29)	2021	2026	(Algeria) JS Kabylie	125	0	Free transfer
Defenders
2	(Algeria)	Rayane Mahrouz	RB	30 November 2004 (aged 19)	2024	2027	(Algeria) Reserve team	30	2	Academy Player
3	(Algeria)	Safieddine Atmania	CB	26 February 2005 (aged 19)		2025	(Algeria) Reserve team	10	0	Academy Player
4	(Democratic Republic of the Congo)	Kévin Mondeko	CB	10 September 1995 (aged 29)	2024	2026	(Democratic Republic of the Congo) TP Mazembe	26	2	Free transfer
5	(Algeria)	Imadeddine Azzi	CB	21 June 1998 (aged 26)	2024	2025	(Kuwait) Kazma	26	1	Loan
15	(Algeria)	Nabil Lamara	LB	15 August 1993 (aged 31)	2023	2025	(Tunisia) Club Africain	50	1	Free transfer
19	(Algeria)	Saâdi Radouani (Note: Radouani played previously for USM Alger from 2015 to 2016.) (C.)	RB	18 March 1995 (aged 29)	2020	2026	(Algeria) ES Sétif	158	9	Free transfer
17	(Algeria)	Haithem Loucif (Note: Loucif played previously for USM Alger from 2021 to 2023.)	RB	8 July 1996 (aged 28)	2025	2027	(Switzerland) Yverdon-Sport	65	1	Undisclosed
21	(Algeria)	Adam Alilet	CB	17 January 1999 (aged 25)	2019	2026	(Algeria) Reserve team	127	8	Academy Player
23	(Algeria)	Ilyes Chetti	LB	22 January 1995 (aged 29)	2024	2027	(Morocco) Wydad AC	30	0	Free transfer
Midfielders
6	(Algeria)	Oussama Chita (V.C.)	DM	31 October 1996 (aged 27)	2017	2025	(Algeria) MC Alger	197	4	Free transfer
8	(Algeria)	Islam Merili	AM	27 June 1998 (aged 26)	2022	2026	(Algeria) ASO Chlef	92	8	Free transfer
9	(Bolivia)	Adalid Terrazas	AM	25 August 2000 (aged 24)	2024	2027	(Bolivia) Always Ready	25	0	Undisclosed
11	(Democratic Republic of the Congo)	Glody Likonza	AM	10 May 1998 (aged 26)	2024	2027	(Democratic Republic of the Congo) TP Mazembe	40	1	Free transfer
14	(Algeria)	Brahim Benzaza	DM	8 April 1997 (aged 27)	2021	2026	(Algeria) ASO Chlef	118	8	Free transfer
18	(Algeria)	Salim Boukhanchouche	DM	6 October 1991 (aged 32)	2024	2026	(Algeria) JS Kabylie	52	3	Free transfer
26	(Algeria)	Abdelkrim Namani	AM	13 May 2003 (aged 21)	2022	2028	(Algeria) Reserve team	33	1	Academy Player
Forwards
7	(Burundi)	Bonfils-Caleb Bimenyimana	ST	21 November 1997 (aged 26)	2025	2026	(Iran) Zob Ahan	12	3	Free transfer
10	(Algeria)	Ghiles Guenaoui	LW	2 August 1998 (aged 26)	2024	2027	(Egypt) Al Masry SC	4	0	200,000 €
12	(Algeria)	Khaled Bousseliou	LW	3 October 1997 (aged 26)	2022	2026	(Algeria) CR Belouizdad	69	6	Free transfer
22	(Nigeria)	Wale Musa Alli	LW	31 December 2000 (aged 23)	2024	2026	(Czech Republic) Zbrojovka Brno	40	2	Undisclosed
27	(Algeria)	Houssam Ghacha	RW / LW	22 October 1995 (aged 28)	2024	2027	(Tunisia) Espérance de Tunis	38	8	Free transfer
28	(Algeria)	Riad Benayad	ST	2 November 1996 (aged 28)	2025	2026	(Tunisia) Espérance de Tunis	19	2	Free transfer
29	(Algeria)	Ahmed Khaldi	RW	22 July 1998 (aged 26)	2024	2027	(Kuwait) Al-Arabi SC	17	3	Free transfer
30	(Algeria)	Mehdi Merghem	RW	19 July 1997 (aged 27)	2025	2027	(Portugal) Farense	14	2	Undisclosed
31	(Algeria)	Mohamed Ben Mazouz	ST	22 March 2004 (aged 20)	2024	2027	(Algeria) Reserve team	20	6	Academy Player
51	(Algeria)	Diaa Eddine Mechid	RW	11 June 2006 (aged 18)	2024	2029	(Algeria) Reserve team	8	0	Academy Player

== Transfers ==
=== In ===
==== Summer ====
Date	Pos	Player	Moving from	Fee	Source
16 June 2024	MF	(Algeria) Kheireddine Toual	ES Ben Aknoun	Loan return	
19 June 2024	CB	(Algeria) Hocine Dehiri	Paradou AC	20,000,000 DA	
8 July 2024	LB	(Algeria) Ilyes Chetti	(Morocco) Wydad AC	Free transfer	
18 July 2024	LW / RW	(Algeria) Houssam Ghacha	(Tunisia) Espérance de Tunis	Transfer	
23 July 2024	AM	(Democratic Republic of the Congo) Glody Likonza	(Democratic Republic of the Congo) TP Mazembe	Free transfer	
23 July 2024	CB	(Democratic Republic of the Congo) Kévin Mondeko	(Democratic Republic of the Congo) TP Mazembe	Free transfer	
27 July 2024	LW	(Algeria) Ghiles Guenaoui	(Egypt) Al Masry SC	200,000 €	
28 July 2024	RB	(Algeria) Rayane Mahrouz	Reserve team	First Professional Contract	
28 July 2024	CB	(Algeria) Safieddine Atmania	Reserve team	First Professional Contract	
6 August 2024	LW	(Nigeria) Wale Musa Alli	(Czech Republic) Zbrojovka Brno	Free transfer	
11 August 2024	CB	(Algeria) Imadeddine Azzi	(Kuwait) Kazma	Loan for one season	
23 August 2024	ST	(Senegal) Sekou Gassama	(Cyprus) Anorthosis Famagusta	Free transfer	
27 August 2024	AM	(Bolivia) Adalid Terrazas	(Bolivia) Always Ready	Undisclosed	

==== Winter ====
Date	Pos	Player	Moving from	Fee	Source
18 December 2024	RW	(Algeria) Ahmed Khaldi	(Kuwait) Al-Arabi SC	Free transfer	
29 January 2025	ST	(Algeria) Riad Benayad	(Tunisia) Espérance de Tunis	Free transfer	
31 January 2025	RW	(Algeria) Mehdi Merghem	(Portugal) Farense	Undisclosed	
5 February 2025	RB	(Algeria) Haithem Loucif	(Switzerland) Yverdon-Sport	Undisclosed	
5 February 2025	ST	(Burundi) Bonfils-Caleb Bimenyimana	(Iran) Zob Ahan	Free transfer	

=== Out ===
==== Summer ====
Date	Pos	Player	Moving to	Fee	Source
16 June 2024	DF	(Algeria) Hocine Dehiri	Paradou AC	Loan return	
16 June 2024	DF	(Algeria) Mustapha Bouchina	Unattached (Note: Bouchina joined RC Kouba on 7 August 2024.)	Free transfer	
16 June 2024	MF	(Algeria) Akram Djahnit	Unattached (Note: Djahnit joined ES Sétif on 23 July 2024.)	Free transfer	
15 July 2024	DF	(Algeria) Zineddine Belaïd	(Belgium) Sint-Truidense	500,000 €	
24 July 2024	CB	(Algeria) Abdessamed Bounacer	(Qatar) Al Sadd SC	500,000 €	
26 July 2024	LB	(Algeria) Juba Chirani	Unattached (Note: Chirani joined NC Magra on 4 August 2024.)	Free transfer (Released)	
26 July 2024	RB	(Algeria) Oussama Barkat	Unattached (Note: Barkat joined US Biskra on 6 August 2024.)	Free transfer (Released)	
26 July 2024	RW	(Algeria) Adel Belkacem Bouzida	Paradou AC	Loan return (Released)	
26 July 2024	FW	(Algeria) Abderrahmane Bacha	Unattached (Note: Bacha joined ES Sétif on 3 September 2024.)	Free transfer	
11 August 2024	FW	(Algeria) Mohamed Amine Bouziane	US Biskra	Free transfer (Released)	
13 August 2024	FW	(Cameroon) Leonel Ateba	(Tanzania) Simba	250,000 €	
31 August 2024	AM	(Mali) Sékou Konaté	Unattached	Free transfer (Released)	
31 August 2024	FW	(Mali) Abdoulaye Kanou	(Morocco) Difaâ El Jadidi	100,000 €	
31 August 2024	RW	(Algeria) Oussama Bellatreche	Unattached (Note: Bellatreche joined Al-Khaldiya on 11 September 2024.)	Free transfer (Released)	
31 August 2024	MF	(Algeria) Sid Mohand Ameziane	(United States) Columbus Crew 2	Free transfer	
7 September 2024	DF	(Algeria) Riad Belhadj Kacem	(Bulgaria) CSKA Sofia	Free transfer	

==== Winter ====
Date	Pos	Player	Moving to	Fee	Source
23 January 2025	RB	(Algeria) Hocine Dehiri	(Kuwait) Qadsia SC	Six months loan	
30 January 2025	AM	(Algeria) Mohamed Ait El Hadj	Unattached (Note: Ait El Hadj joined Paradou AC on 5 February 2025.)	Free transfer (Released)	
31 January 2025	ST	(Senegal) Sekou Gassama	Unattached (Note: Gassama joined CD Eldense on 3 February 2025.)	Free transfer (Released)	
3 February 2025	DM	(Algeria) Omar Embarek	ES Mostaganem	Six months loan	
13 February 2025	LW	(Algeria) Ismail Belkacemi	(Libya) Al Ahli SC	450,000 $	

=== New contracts ===
No.	Pos	Player	Contract length	Contract end	Date	Source
81	CB	Abdessamed Bounacer	2 years	2027	19 June 2024	
18	DM	Salim Boukhanchouche	2 years	2027	19 June 2024	
38	AM	Abdelkrim Namani	4 years	2028	20 June 2024	
2	RB	Rayane Mahrouz	2 years	2027	25 August 2024	
31	ST	Mohamed Ben Mazouz	2 years	2027	16 October 2024	
16	GK	Kamel Soufi	2 years	2027	14 May 2025	
51	RW	Diaa Eddine Mechid	4 years	2029	21 May 2025	

== Pre-season and friendlies ==
15 August 2024 Friendly	AS Gabès (Tunisia)	0–0	(Algeria) USM Alger	Tabarka, Tunisia
18:00 UTC+1		Report		Stadium: La Cigale Tabarka Sport
Note: Lineup for USM Alger; First half – Benbot, Radouani, Chetti, Alilet, Mondeko, Boukhanchouche, Likonza, Merili, Belkacemi, Ghacha, Musa Alli. Second half – Soufi, Radouani, Dehiri, Mondeko (Chetti, 68'), Azzi, Chita, Namani, Benzaza, Ait El Hadj, Bousseliou, Belkacemi (Musa Alli, 68').

21 August 2024 Friendly	AS Soliman (Tunisia)	0–1	(Algeria) USM Alger	Tabarka, Tunisia
18:00 UTC+1		Report	Mohamed Said Benmaazouz 53'	Stadium: La Cigale Tabarka Sport
Note: Lineup for USM Alger; First half – Benbot, Radouani, Dehiri, Mondeko, Azzi, Boukhanchouche, Likonza, Benzaza, Guenaoui, Ghacha, Musa Alli. Second half – Soufi, Kennane, Mahrouz, Atamnia, Mondeko (Dehiri, 76'), Chita, Namani, Merili, Ait El Hadj, Musa Alli, Benmaazouz.

22 August 2024 Friendly	USM Alger	1–2	ES Mostaganem	Tabarka, Tunisia
17:30 UTC+1	Belkacemi 61'		Akram Bibi (?); Chakib Aoudjane (?)	Stadium: La Cigale Tabarka Sport
Note: Lineup for USM Alger; First half – Sifour, Kennane, Mahrouz, Azzi, Boukhanchouche, Namani, Benzaza, Merili, Ait El Hadj, Bousseliou, Benmaazouz. Second half – Benbot, Radouani, Dehiri, Azzi, Alilet, Chita, Likonza, Merili, Ghacha, Guenaoui, Belkacemi.

23 August 2024 Friendly	USM Alger	1–1	ES Sétif	Tabarka, Tunisia
17:30 UTC+1	Belkacemi 39' (pen.)	Report	Djahnit (?)	Stadium: La Cigale Tabarka Sport
Note: Lineup for USM Alger – Benbot, Radouani, Mondeko, Alilet, Mahrouz, Boukhanchouche, Likonza, Musa Alli, Ghacha, Guenaoui (Benzaza, 82'), Belkacemi (Chita, 65').

27 August 2024 Friendly	USM Alger	2–1	Olympique Akbou	Tabarka, Tunisia
17:30 UTC+1	Guenaoui 80' (pen.); Gassama 90+5' (pen.)	Report	Walid Adrar (?)	Stadium: La Cigale Tabarka Sport
Note: Lineup for USM Alger – Benbot, Radouani, Dehiri, Alilet, Mondeko, Boukhanchouche, Chita, Likonza, Musa Alli, Ghacha, Belkacemi.

31 August 2024 Friendly	USM Alger (Algeria)	1–0	(Libya) Olympic Azzaweya	Tabarka, Tunisia
17:30 UTC+1	Musa Alli 33'			Stadium: La Cigale Tabarka Sport
Note: Lineup for USM Alger – Benbot (Soufi, 67'), Radouani, Azzi, Alilet (Benzaza, 76'), Mahrouz, Boukhanchouche (Chita, 63'), Likonza (Namani, 76'), Merili, Musa Alli (Bousseliou, 63'), Ghacha (Ait El Hadj, 82'), Guenaoui.

8 September 2024 Friendly	USM Alger	3–0	ESM Koléa	Bologhine
18:00 UTC+1	Terrazas 28'; Guenaoui 31'; Bousseliou 90'			Stadium: Omar Hamadi Stadium; Attendance: 0 (close doors)

3 November 2024 Friendly	USM Alger	2–2	JS El Biar	Bologhine
17:00 UTC+1	Benzaza 23'; Gassama 50'			Stadium: Omar Hamadi Stadium; Attendance: 0 (close doors)

== Competitions ==
=== Overview ===
Competition	Record								Started round	Final position / round	First match	Last match
Competition	G	W	D	L	GF	GA	GD	Win %	Started round	Final position / round	First match	Last match
Ligue 1	30	10	10	10	26	26	+0	33.33	—N/a	7th	28 September 2024	20 June 2025
Algerian Cup	6	6	0	0	16	0	+16	100.00	Round of 64	Winners	16 January 2025	5 July 2025
Confederation Cup	10	5	4	1	18	5	+13	50.00	Second round	Quarter-finals	14 September 2024	9 April 2025
Total	46	21	14	11	60	31	+29	45.65				

Updated to match played 5 July 2025
Source: Competitions

=== Ligue 1 ===
==== League table ====
Pos	Team	Pld	W	D	L	GF	GA	GD	Pts	Qualification or relegation
5	Paradou AC	30	11	8	11	41	39	+2	41	
6	ES Sétif	30	11	8	11	21	24	−3	41	
7	USM Alger	30	10	10	10	26	26	0	40	Qualification for Confederation Cup (Note: USMA Alger qualified for the 2025–26 CAF Confederation Cup by winning the 2024–25 Algerian Cup)
8	MC Oran	30	12	4	14	32	33	−1	40	
9	USM Khenchela	30	11	7	12	28	38	−10	40	

Source: the-sports.org
Rules for classification: 1) points; 2) head-to-head points; 3) head-to-head goal difference; 4) goal difference; 5) total goals; 6) fairplay ranking; 7) playoff.

==== Results summary ====
Overall								Home						Away					
Pld	W	D	L	GF	GA	GD	Pts	W	D	L	GF	GA	GD	W	D	L	GF	GA	GD
30	10	10	10	26	26	0	40	9	3	3	20	10	+10	1	7	7	6	16	−10

Last updated: 20 June 2025.
Source: Competitive matches

==== Results by round ====
Round	1	2	3	4	5	6	7	8	9	10	11	12	13	14	15	16	17	18	19	20	21	22	23	24	25	26	27	28	29	30
Ground	H	A	H	A	H	A	H	A	H	A	H	A	H	A	H	A	H	A	H	A	H	A	H	A	H	A	H	A	H	A
Result	W	D	W	W	D	D	L	D	W	L	D	D	W	D	W	D	W	L	W	D	L	L	L	L	W	L	D	L	W	L
Position	4	4	1	1	2	3	4	5	2	4	5	7	4	5	3	3	3	3	3	3	4	4	5	7	5	7	7	8	6	7

Updated to match(es) played on 21 June 2025. Source: Competitive matches
A = Away; H = Home; W = Win; D = Draw; L = Loss

==== Matches ====
The league fixtures were announced on 11 July 2024.

All times are local, WAT (UTC+1).

Win Draw Loss Postponed

28 September 2024 Round 2	NC Magra	0–0	USM Alger	Magra
16:00	Zaitri (yellow card) 52'; Bekakchi (yellow card) 76' (yellow-red card) 90+4'	Report	Gassama (yellow card) 76'; Musa Alli (yellow card) 80'	Stadium: Boucheligue Brothers Stadium; Attendance: 0 (close doors); Referee: Alaa Bouab; Assistant referees: Bilal Belout, Mohamed Lamine Benhamouda; Fourth official: Tahar Boudjemaa

2 October 2024 Round 1	USM Alger	2–1	US Biskra	Baraki
19:00	Radouani (yellow card) 60'; Mondeko (yellow card) 62' (yellow-red card) 90+6'; Belkacemi 72' (pen.); Musa Alli 80'	Report	Bourahla (yellow card) 34'; Khoualed (yellow card) 51'; Benzid (yellow card) 64'; Talah 86'	Stadium: Nelson Mandela Stadium; Referee: Fateh Harkat; Assistant referees: Mohamed Ghozlane, Hamza Zitouni; Fourth official: Marouane Mohamed Belkebir; VAR: Mustapha Ghorbal

6 October 2024 Round 3	USM Alger	1–0	MC El Bayadh	Baraki
18:00	Ait El Hadj (yellow card) 15'; Ghacha 31'; Radouani (yellow card) 90+1'	Report	Kouar (yellow card) 80'	Stadium: Nelson Mandela Stadium; Referee: Tahar Boudjemâa; Assistant referees: Bouima Haytem, Islem Boukhatem; Fourth official: Ghada Mahat; VAR: Lahlou Benbraham

18 October 2024 Round 5	USM Alger	0–0	CR Belouizdad	Algiers
19:00	Boukhanchouche (yellow card) 28'; Benbot (yellow card) 37'; Likonza (yellow card) 81'	Report	Keddad (yellow card) 26'; Azzi (yellow card) 64'; Zeghba (yellow card) 90+1'; Slimani (yellow card) 90+6'	Stadium: Stade du 5 Juillet; Referee: Mehdi Oukil; Assistant referees: Moussa Saidani, Mahieddine Ali; Fourth official: Mohamed Boutaraa; VAR: Alaa Bouab

22 October 2024 (Note: The match between ES Mostaganem and USM Alger is postponed from October 12, to October 22, 2024, due to the presence of three players from USM Alger with their national teams, Benbot and Radouani with Algeria and Terrazas with Bolivia.) Round 4	ES Mostaganem	0–1	USM Alger	Mostaganem
17:30	Hitala (yellow card) 43'; Meddah (yellow card) 53'	Report	Gassama 26'; Musa Alli (yellow card) 36'; Radouani (yellow card) 90'	Stadium: Mohamed Bensaïd Stadium; Referee: Youcef Gamouh; Assistant referees: Antar Boulfelfel, Haytem Bouima; Fourth official: Yahia Dehar; VAR: Youcef Taieb Bouderbal

26 October 2024 Round 6	ASO Chlef	0–0	USM Alger	Chlef
16:00	Brahimi (yellow card) 56'	Report	Alilet (yellow card) 21'; Boukhanchouche (yellow card) 45'	Stadium: Mohamed Boumezrag Stadium; Referee: Alaa Bouab; Assistant referees: Bilal Belout, Mohamed Lamine Benhamouda; Fourth official: Mohamed Boutaraa

9 November 2024 Round 8	JS Kabylie	0–0	USM Alger	Tizi Ouzou
17:30	Bwalya (yellow card) 61'	Report	Alilet (yellow card) 90+4'; Embarek (yellow card) 90+5'	Stadium: Hocine Aït Ahmed Stadium; Referee: Mustapha Ghorbal; Assistant referees: Akram Zerhouni, Yacine Ouerd Benslama; Fourth official: Youcef Gamouh; VAR: Lahlou Benbraham

16 November 2024 Round 9	USM Alger	2–0	JS Saoura	Algiers
17:30	Boukhanchouche 19'; Belkacemi (yellow card) 25' (goal) 65' (pen.)	Report	Akacem (yellow card) 9'; Belmiloud (yellow card) 44'; Ouabdi (yellow card) 62'	Stadium: Stade du 5 Juillet; Attendance: 0 (close doors); Referee: Akram Mechairia; Assistant referees: Mohammed Hamaidi, Ghazli; Fourth official: Mohamed Lamine Chaoubi; VAR: Rafik Aouina

21 November 2024 Round 10	CS Constantine	1–0	USM Alger	Constantine
20:00	Boudrama 34' (yellow card) 73'; Boussouf (yellow card) 88'; Bellaouel (yellow card) 90+4'; Rebiaï (yellow card) 90+4'; Benchaira (yellow card) 90+7'	Report		Stadium: Chahid Hamlaoui Stadium; Referee: Youcef Taieb Bouderbal; Assistant referees: Akram Sohbi, mustapha Kessar; Fourth official: Tahar Boudjemaa; VAR: Fateh Harkat

21 December 2024 Round 14	ES Sétif	1–1	USM Alger	Sétif
17:00	Boukerma (yellow card) 13'; Bouchama 90+10'	Report	Chita (yellow card) 29'; Ghacha 30'; Azzi (yellow card) 90+2'	Stadium: 8 May 1945 Stadium; Referee: Nabil Boukhalfa; Assistant referees: Yacine Ouerd Benslama, Amine Belaroussi; Fourth official: Rafik Aouina; VAR: Lahlou Benbraham

26 December 2024 Round 15	USM Alger	3–0	MC Oran	Algiers
19:00	Benzaza (yellow card) 45+1' (goal) 48'; Boukhanchouche (yellow card) 74'; Aggoun 90+3' (o.g.); Azzi 90+6'	Report	Kerroum (yellow card) 58'	Stadium: Stade du 5 Juillet; Referee: Rafik Aouina; Assistant referees: Redouane Amroune, Lotfi Zerouga; Fourth official: Mohamed Lamine Chaoubi; VAR: Yahia Dehar

24 January 2025 (Note: The match between USM Alger and MC Alger is postponed from November 2 to November 5, 2024, due to preparations for the festivities of November 1 and the celebration of the 70th anniversary of the outbreak of the revolution. Then on October 27, it was postponed to January 24, 2025.) Round 7	USM Alger	0–3	MC Alger	Algiers
18:00	Benzaza (yellow card) 46'	Report	Messoussa 49'; Kipre 57'; Benkhemassa (yellow card) 70'; Abdellaoui (yellow card) 77'; Bayazid 90+12'	Stadium: Stade du 5 Juillet; Referee: Akram Mechairia; Assistant referees: Anouar Ghazli, Mohammed Hamaidi; Fourth official: Mohamed Bouteraa; VAR: Fateh Harkat

28 January 2025 Round 11	USM Alger	1–1	Paradou AC	Algiers
19:00	Mondeko (red card) 45+7'; Azzi (yellow card) 49'; Belkacemi 54' (pen.); Lamara (yellow card) 90+6'	Report	Tahar (yellow card) 45+1'; Boulbina 45+10' (pen.) (yellow card) 45+10'	Stadium: Stade du 5 Juillet; Referee: Youcef Taieb Bouderbal; Assistant referees: Mohamed Sohbi, Mustapha Kessar; Fourth official: Abdelali Ibrir; VAR: Redouane Allou

1 February 2025 Round 12	Olympique Akbou	0–0	USM Alger	Béjaïa
15:00	Lamri (yellow card) 90+6'	Report	Ghacha (yellow card) 10'; Mahrouz (yellow card) 56' (yellow-red card) 88'	Stadium: Maghrebi Unity Stadium; Referee: Fodil Oukil; Assistant referees: Manel Saïdani, Ali Mustapha; Fourth official: Ghada Mehat; VAR: Abderahmane Sahraoui

5 February 2025 Round 13	USM Alger	3–0	USM Khenchela	Baraki
17:00	Belkacemi 34' (pen.); Benbot (yellow card) 45+4'; Ghacha 71', 79'	Report	Litim (yellow card) 32'; Touki (yellow card) 66'	Stadium: Nelson Mandela Stadium; Attendance: 0 (close doors); Referee: Tahar Boudjemaa; Assistant referees: Youssef Arioua, Imadeddine Benbouriche; Fourth official: Mohamed Lamine Chaoubi; VAR: Nabil Boukhalfa

14 February 2025 Round 16	US Biskra	0–0	USM Alger	Biskra
17:00	Saâd (yellow card) 45+2'; Talah (yellow card) 58'; Bourahla (yellow card) 87'	Report	Azzi (yellow card) 73'; Lamara (yellow card) 79'; Terrazas (yellow card) 85'	Stadium: 18 February Stadium; Attendance: 0 (close doors); Referee: Abderahmane Sahraoui; Assistant referees: Hamza Bouzit, Antar Boulfelfel; Fourth official: Ghada Mehat
Note: The new coach Marcos Paquetá, was present in the stands and was replaced on the field by Sofiane Benkhelifa.

18 February 2025 Round 17	USM Alger	2–0	NC Magra	Baraki
20:00	Azzi (yellow card) 2'; Likonza 38' (yellow card) 38'; Merili (yellow card) 55'; Merghem 59'	Report		Stadium: Nelson Mandela Stadium; Referee: Fateh Harkat; Assistant referees: Mohamed Ghozlene, Hamza Zitouni; Fourth official: Hichem Benokba
Note: The first match for the new coach Marcos Paquetá.

27 February 2025 Round 18	MC El Bayadh	2–1	USM Alger	El Bayadh
15:30	Chahrour (yellow card) 26'; Sediri 33'; Toumi Sief 47'	Report	Bimenyimana 71'; Boukhanchouche (yellow card) 77'	Stadium: Zakaria Medjdoub Stadium; Attendance: 0 (close doors); Referee: Abdelali Ibrir; Assistant referees: Lamine Chellali, Abdelkader Menacer; Fourth official: Yagoub Djariou

6 March 2025 Round 19	USM Alger	1–0	ES Mostaganem	Baraki
22:00	Benlamri 32' (o.g.); Boukhanchouche (yellow card) 3'; Likonza (yellow card) 78'	Report	Hitala (yellow card) 52'; Embarek (yellow card) 59'	Stadium: Nelson Mandela Stadium; Referee: Tahar Boudjemaa; Assistant referees: Youssef Arioua, Imadeddine Benbouriche; Fourth official: Mohamed Lamine Chaoubi; VAR: Youcef Taieb Bouderbal

16 March 2025 Round 20	CR Belouizdad	1–1	USM Alger	Baraki
22:00	Benguit (yellow card) 62'; Mahious 71'	Report	Benzaza 66'; Boukhanchouche (yellow card) 90+1'; Likonza (yellow card) 90+2'	Stadium: Nelson Mandela Stadium; Referee: Nabil Boukhalfa; Assistant referees: Yacine Ouard Benslama, Amine Belaroussi; Fourth official: Ghada Mehat; VAR: Tahar Boudjemaa

19 April 2025 Round 23	USM Alger	0–1	JS Kabylie	Algiers
19:00	Merili (yellow card) 42'	Report	Boualia (yellow card) 45'; Djabri (yellow card) 72'; Sarr (yellow card) 82' (goal) 90+3'	Stadium: Stade du 5 Juillet; Attendance: 0 (close doors); Referee: Akram Mechairia; Assistant referees: Haytem Bouima, Mohammed Hamaidi; Fourth official: Tayeb Benyabka; VAR: Nabil Boukhalfa

26 April 2025 Round 24	JS Saoura	2–1	USM Alger	Béchar
18:00	Boutiche 34'; Akacem 67' (pen.)	Report	Alilet 58' (pen.)	Stadium: 20 August 1955 Stadium; Referee: Rafik Aouina; Assistant referees: Redouane Amroune, Lotfi Zerouga; Fourth official: Benamar Sellakh

30 April 2025 Round 21	USM Alger	1–2	ASO Chlef	Algiers
18:00	Namani (yellow card) 11'; Mahrouz (yellow card) 22'; Benzaza (yellow card) 39'; Bimenyimana 90+1' (pen.)	Report	Ledlum 2'; Sadahine 66'; Kacem (yellow card) 72'	Stadium: Stade du 5 Juillet; Referee: Mehdi Oukil; Assistant referees: Moussa Saidani, Mahieddine Ali; Fourth official: Mohamed Belkebir Abderahmane; VAR: Lotfi Bekouassa
Note: Assistant coach Sofiane Ben Khalifa, fitness coach Belaïd Medjahed and goalkeeping coach Elias Ben Haha lead the match.

11 May 2025 Round 25	USM Alger	2–1	CS Constantine	Algiers
19:00	Benzaza (yellow card) 63'; Mahrouz 77'; Boukhanchouche (yellow card) 85' (yellow-red card) 90+4'; Benayad 88' (yellow card) 89'	Report	Benchaira (yellow card) 28'; Belhocini 45+1'	Stadium: Stade du 5 Juillet; Referee: Youcef Taieb Bouderbal; Assistant referees: Akram Sohbi, mustapha Kessar; Fourth official: Karim Aït Ameur; VAR: Lahlou Benbraham
Note: First match for new assistant coach Mohamed Lacet, before appointing a new coach

17 May 2025 Round 26	Paradou AC	3–1	USM Alger	Baraki
19:30	Boulbina 4', 90+7' (yellow card) 90+7'; Salem 19'	Report	Ghacha 80' (pen.)	Stadium: Nelson Mandela Stadium; Referee: Mustapha Ghorbal; Assistant referees: Akram Zerhouni, Mokrane Gourari; Fourth official: Haitham Ghouti; VAR: Youcef Gamouh

23 May 2025 Round 22	MC Alger	1–0	USM Alger	Algiers
20:00	Bouras 33'; Benkhemassa (yellow card) 82'; Khelif (yellow card) 90+4'	Report	Terrazas (yellow card) 90+6'	Stadium: Stade du 5 Juillet; Referee: Tahar Boudjemaa; Assistant referees: Adel Abane, Imadeddine Benbouriche; Fourth official: Redouane Allou; VAR: Lahlou Benbraham

26 May 2025 Round 27	USM Alger	1–1	Olympique Akbou	Algiers
20:00	Bousseliou (yellow card) 33'; Alilet (yellow card) 82'; Bimenyimana 90+2'	Report	Bouteldja (yellow card) 38'; Zamoum 86' (yellow card) 87'	Stadium: Stade du 5 Juillet; Attendance: 0 (close doors); Referee: Youcef Gamouh; Assistant referees: Bilal Belout, Islem Boukhatem; Fourth official: Mehdi Oukil; VAR: Yahia Dehar

11 June 2025 Round 28	USM Khenchela	1–0	USM Alger	Khenchela
17:00	Zenasni (yellow card) 45'; Sameur (yellow card) 60'; Djaouchi 80'	Report		Stadium: Amar Hamam Stadium; Attendance: 0 (close doors); Referee: Tayeb Benyabka; Assistant referees: Sidi Boumediene Touileb, Idriss Seyf El Islam Kdroussi; Fourth official: Zouhir Maansri

16 June 2025 Round 29	USM Alger	1–0	ES Sétif	Algiers
21:00	Ghacha 85'	Report		Stadium: Stade du 5 Juillet; Referee: Akram Mechairia; Assistant referees: Antar Boulfelfel, Mohammed Hamaidi; Fourth official: Redouane Allou; VAR: Haitham Ghouti

20 June 2025 Round 30	MC Oran	4–0	USM Alger	Oran
18:00	Goudjil 40'; Moulay 85'; Jobe 90+1'; Benatia 90+4'	Report		Stadium: Ahmed Zabana Stadium; Referee: Mehdi Oukil; Assistant referees: Kamad, Sofiane Cherif Zaatri; Fourth official: Oussama Mekfoudji

=== Algerian Cup ===
16 January 2025 Round of 64	USM Alger	6–0	Olympique Magrane	Algiers
19:00	Ben Mazouz 31', 71', 86'; Bousseliou 36'; Boukhanchouche 74'; Mahrouz 90+2'	Report		Stadium: Stade du 5 Juillet; Referee: Ghada Mehat; Assistant referees: Hamza Bouzit, Amirouche Boufassa; Fourth official: Abderahmane Sahraoui
Note: USM Alger Lineups: Soufi, Radouani (substituted off) 46' (Mahrouz, (substituted on) 46'), Chetti (substituted off) 46' (Lamara, (substituted on) 46'), Mondeko, Alilet, Boukhanchouche (substituted off) 77' (Chita, (substituted on) 77'), Merili, Terrazas (substituted off) 64' (Benzaza, (substituted on) 64'), Ben Mazouz, Ghacha (substituted off) 64' (Belkacemi, (substituted on) 64'), Bousseliou.

10 February 2025 Round of 32	USM Alger	1–0	NC Magra	Algiers
19:00	Belkacemi 47'; Khaldi (yellow card) 55'	Report	Lakehal (yellow card) 16'	Stadium: Stade du 5 Juillet; Referee: Ayoub Belhachemi; Assistant referees: Seguir, Anes Bouriah; Fourth official: Amine Hamadache

11 March 2025 Round of 16	RC Kouba	0–1	USM Alger	Kouba
22:00	Kermiche (yellow card) 63'	Report	Merghem 70' (pen.); Likonza (yellow card) 90'; Bousseliou (yellow card) 90+6'	Stadium: Mohamed Benhaddad Stadium; Referee: Hamza Bouslimani; Assistant referees: Habib Belbachir, Kadhafi Badache; Fourth official: Amine Sekhraoui

27 March 2025 Quarter-finals	CR Témouchent	0–5	USM Alger	Oran
22:30		Report	Khaldi 24', 66'; Ben Mazouz 42', 71'; Ghacha 90'	Stadium: Miloud Hadefi Stadium; Referee: Youcef Taieb Bouderbal; Assistant referees: Akram Sohbi, mustapha Kessar; Fourth official: Tayeb Benyabka; VAR: Yahia Dehar
Note: The quarter-final games were played at neutral venues with the VAR technology.

15 April 2025 Semi-finals	USM Alger	1–0 (a.e.t.)	USM El Harrach	Algiers
20:45	Benbot (yellow card) 43'; Azzi (yellow card) 69'; Boukhanchouche (yellow card) 71'; Alilet (yellow card) 90+2', (red card) 120+4'; Alilet 105+1' (pen.)	Report		Stadium: Stade du 5 Juillet; Referee: Yahia Dehar; Assistant referees: Hamza Bouzit, Med Elamine Rezgua; Fourth official: Anes Azrine; VAR: Fateh Harkat
Note: The semi-final games were played at neutral venues with the VAR technology.

5 July 2025 Final	USM Alger	2–0	CR Belouizdad	Baraki
17:00	Benayad 9'; Khaldi 13'	Report		Stadium: Nelson Mandela Stadium; Referee: Yahia Dehar; Assistant referees: Hocine Hadj Yahia, Anouar Ghazli; Fourth official: Tahar Boudjemaa; VAR: Fateh Harkat

=== Confederation Cup ===
==== Qualifying rounds ====
In the qualifying rounds, each tie will be played on a home-and-away two-legged basis. If the aggregate score will be tied after the second leg, the away goals rule was applied, and if still tied, extra time will not be played, and the penalty shoot-out will be used to determine the winner (Regulations III. 13 & 14). The draw for the qualifying rounds was held on 11 July 2024, 12:00 GMT (15:00 local time, UTC+3), at the CAF headquarters in Cairo, Egypt.

===== Second round =====
14 September 2024 First leg	Stade Tunisien (Tunisia)	1–0	(Algeria) USM Alger	Radès
19:00 UTC+1	Smaali 86' (yellow card) 87'; Helal (yellow card) 90'; Oumarou (yellow card) 90'	Report	Terrazas (yellow card) 68'; Boukhanchouche (yellow card) 82'	Stadium: Hammadi Agrebi Stadium; Referee: Jean-Pierre Nguiene (Republic of the Congo); Assistant referees: Jean Prislas Malanda, Vital Dictin Mapangoulou (Republic of the Congo); Fourth official: Jean Pierre Kabangu (DR Congo)
Note: Lineup for USM Alger – Benbot, Radouani (c), Chetti, Mondeko, Alilet, Boukhanchouche, Likonza, Terrazas (substituted off) 71' (Musa Alli, (substituted on) 71'), Guenaoui, Ghacha, Belkacemi.

22 September 2024 Second leg	USM Alger (Algeria)	2–0 (2–1 agg.)	(Tunisia) Stade Tunisien	Oran
18:00 UTC+1	Mondeko 75'; Mejri 90+3' (o.g.); Gassama (yellow card) 90+5'	Report	Saafi (yellow card) 26'; Mejri (yellow card) 33'; Khalfa (yellow card) 42'; Hlel (yellow card) 60'; Ndaw (yellow card) 70'	Stadium: Miloud Hadefi Stadium; Referee: Sabri Mohamed Fadul (Sudan); Assistant referees: Abdelgabar Mohamed Abdelgabar, Haitham Ahmed (Sudan); Fourth official: Alamin Alhadi Alamin Mohamed (Sudan)
Note: Lineup for USM Alger – Benbot, Radouani (c), Chetti (substituted off) 76' (Dehiri, (substituted on) 76'), Mondeko, Alilet, Boukhanchouche (substituted off) 46' (Musa Alli, (substituted on) 46'), Likonza, Terrazas (substituted off) 77' (Merili, (substituted on) 77'), Guenaoui (substituted off) 90+5' (Azzi, (substituted on) 90+5'), Ghacha (substituted off) 68' (Belkacemi, (substituted on) 68'), Gassama.

==== Group stage ====
The draw for the group stage was held on 7 October 2024, 10:00 GMT (13:00 local time, UTC+3), in Cairo, Egypt. The 16 winners of the second round of qualifying rounds will be drawn into four groups of four. The teams were seeded by their performances in the CAF competitions for the previous five seasons (CAF 5-year ranking points shown next to every team). Each group will contain one team from each of Pot 1 and Pot 2, and two teams from Pot 3, and each team will be allocated to the positions in their group according to their pot.

Pos	Team	Pld	W	D	L	GF	GA	GD	Pts	Qualification	USMA	ASEC	JAR	ORP
1	(Algeria) USM Alger	6	4	2	0	14	2	+12	14	Advance to knockout stage	—	3–0	2–0	6–0
2	(Ivory Coast) ASEC Mimosas	6	2	2	2	7	5	+2	8 (Note: Ranked on goal difference in head-to-head matches: ASEC Mimosas +1, ASC Jaraaf –1.)	Advance to knockout stage	1–1	—	2–0	4–0
3	(Senegal) ASC Jaraaf	6	2	2	2	2	4	−2	8		0–0	1–0	—	1–0
4	(Botswana) Orapa United	6	0	2	4	1	13	−12	2		1–2	0–0	0–0	—

Source: CAF
Notes:

27 November 2024 1	USM Alger (Algeria)	6–0	(Botswana) Orapa United	Algiers
20:00 UTC+1	Belkacemi 4', 15'; Radouani 34'; Alli 45+1'; Lamara 48'; Merili 71'	Report	Ratlhogo (yellow card) 54'	Stadium: Stade du 5 Juillet; Referee: Lamin Jammeh (Gambia); Assistant referees: Mustapha Bojang, Abass Bah (Gambia); Fourth official: Omar Sallah (Gambia)

8 December 2024 2	ASC Jaraaf (Senegal)	0–0	(Algeria) USM Alger	Dakar
17:00 UTC+1	Bocandé (yellow card) 35'; Ben Ahmed Ba (yellow card) 49'	Report	Ghacha (yellow card) 47'; Chita (yellow card) 90+6'	Stadium: Stade Abdoulaye Wade; Referee: Samuel Uwikunda (Rwanda); Assistant referees: Justin Karangwa, Didier Ishimwe (Rwanda); Fourth official: Nsoro Ruzindana (Rwanda)

15 December 2024 3	USM Alger (Algeria)	3–0	(Ivory Coast) ASEC Mimosas	Algiers
20:00 UTC+1	Ali Yabré 16' (o.g.); Belkacemi 41' (pen.), 54'; Chita (yellow card) 50'	Report	Coulibaly (yellow card) 32'	Stadium: Stade du 5 Juillet; Referee: Abdoulaye Manet (Guinea); Assistant referees: Sidiki Sidibé, Mamady Tere (Guinea); Fourth official: Younoussa Camara (Guinea)

5 January 2025 4	ASEC Mimosas (Ivory Coast)	1–1	(Algeria) USM Alger	Abidjan
16:00 UTC+0	Diarrassouba 31'	Report	Azzi (yellow card) 56'; Radouani (yellow card) 61'; Boukhanchouche (yellow card) 70'; Ben Mazouz 71'; Benbot (yellow card) 90+4'	Stadium: Felix Houphouet Boigny Stadium; Referee: Jean Pierre Nguiene (Republic of Congo); Assistant referees: Jean Prislas Malanda, Vital Dictin Mapangoulou (Republic of Congo); Fourth official: Jean Pierre Kabangu (DR Congo)

12 January 2025 5	Orapa United (Botswana)	1–2	(Algeria) USM Alger	Francistown
15:00 UTC+2	Ratlhogo (yellow card) 22'; Azende (yellow card) 59'; Kamberipa (yellow card) 61'; Moloi 90+5'	Report	Gassama 14'; Azzi (yellow card) 32'; Mondeko (yellow card) 45+3'; Ghacha 60'; Chetti (yellow card) 71'	Stadium: Obed Itani Chilume Stadium; Referee: Joseph Ogabor (Nigeria); Assistant referees: Abdulmajeed Olaide, Muhammad Yakubu (Nigeria); Fourth official: Salisu Basheer (Nigeria)

19 January 2025 6	USM Alger (Algeria)	2–0	(Senegal) ASC Jaraaf	Algiers
20:00 UTC+1	Belkacemi 81'; Radouani 90+9'	Report	Fall (yellow card) 50'	Stadium: Stade du 5 Juillet; Referee: Aklesso Gnama (Togo); Assistant referees: Koffi Ahonto, Abdou Kpelafia (Togo); Fourth official: Kouassi Attiogbe (Togo)

==== knockout stage ====
Each tie in the knockout phase will be played over two legs, with each team playing one leg at home. The team that will score more goals on aggregate over the two legs will advance to the next round. If the aggregate score will be level, the away goals rule will be applied, i.e. the team that will score more goals away from home over the two legs will advance. If away goals will be also equal, then extra time will not be played and the winners will be decided by a penalty shoot-out (Regulations III. 26 & 27). The bracket was decided after the draw for the knockout stage, which was held on 20 February 2025, 17:00 AST (UTC+3) at the beIN Sports headquarters in Doha, Qatar.

===== Quarter-finals =====
2 April 2025 First leg	CS Constantine (Algeria)	1–1	(Algeria) USM Alger	Constantine
17:00 UTC+1	Temine 29'; Rebiaï (yellow card) 37'; Tapsoba (yellow card) 78'; Boudrama (yellow card) 90+4'; Bellaouel (yellow card) 90+9'	Report	Boukhanchouche (yellow card) 43' (yellow-red card) 75'; Mondeko 73'; Benbot (yellow card) 90+6'; Alilet (yellow card) 90+9'	Stadium: Chahid Hamlaoui Stadium; Referee: Dahane Beida (Mauritania); Assistant referees: Gerson Emiliano, Evalindo Meireles (Angola); Fourth official: Mehrez Malki (Tunisia)

9 April 2025 Second leg	USM Alger (Algeria)	1–1 (2–2 agg.) (3–4 p)	(Algeria) CS Constantine	Algiers
20:00 UTC+1	Ghacha (yellow card) 9'; Alilet 25' (pen.); Chita (yellow card) 29'	Report	Merbah (yellow card) 37'; Belhocini 56'	Stadium: Stade du 5 Juillet; Referee: Amin Omar (Egypt); Assistant referees: Hossam Ahmed Taha, Mahmoud Ahmed Kamal (Egypt); Fourth official: Mahmoud Mansour (Egypt)
	Penalties
	Alilet (penalty missed); Mondeko (penalty scored); Mahrouz (penalty missed); Terrazas (penalty scored); Ghacha (penalty scored)		(penalty scored) Dib; (penalty scored) Boudrama; (penalty missed) Merbah; (penalty scored) Temine; (penalty scored) Bouguerra

== Squad information ==
=== Appearances and goals ===
As of 5 July 2025

No.	Pos	Player	Nat	Ligue 1			Algerian Cup			Confederation Cup			Total		
No.	Pos	Player	Nat	App	St	G	App	St	G	App	St	G	App	St	G
Goalkeepers
1	GK	Abdelmoumen Sifour	(Algeria)	1	1	0	0	0	0	0	0	0	1	1	0
16	GK	Kamel Soufi	(Algeria)	5	4	0	1	1	0	1	1	0	7	6	0
25	GK	Oussama Benbot	(Algeria)	25	25	0	5	5	0	9	9	0	39	39	0
Defenders
2	RB	Rayane Mahrouz	(Algeria)	20	15	1	4	2	1	6	2	0	30	19	2
3	CB	Safieddine Atmania	(Algeria)	8	7	0	0	0	0	0	0	0	8	7	0
4	CB	Kévin Mondeko	(Democratic Republic of the Congo)	14	14	0	4	4	0	8	8	2	26	26	2
5	CB	Imadeddine Azzi	(Algeria)	18	16	1	3	3	0	5	4	0	26	23	1
15	LB	Nabil Lamara	(Algeria)	13	9	0	3	1	0	4	3	1	20	13	1
17	RB	Haithem Loucif	(Algeria)	6	4	0	4	3	0	2	2	0	12	9	0
19	RB	Saâdi Radouani	(Algeria)	21	19	0	3	2	0	8	8	2	32	29	2
21	CB	Adam Alilet	(Algeria)	18	17	0	6	5	1	8	8	1	32	30	2
23	LB	Ilyes Chetti	(Algeria)	21	16	0	4	4	0	5	5	0	30	25	0
33	LB	Aymen Kennan (Note: Player from USM Alger Reserve)	(Algeria)	1	1	0	0	0	0	0	0	0	1	1	0
Midfielders
6	DM	Oussama Chita	(Algeria)	17	10	0	5	0	0	6	4	0	28	14	0
8	DM	Islam Merili	(Algeria)	16	9	0	4	3	0	6	0	1	26	12	1
9	AM	Adalid Terrazas	(Bolivia)	15	5	0	3	2	0	7	2	0	25	9	0
11	AM	Glody Likonza	(Democratic Republic of the Congo)	26	23	1	4	3	0	10	9	0	40	35	1
14	DM	Brahim Benzaza	(Algeria)	24	15	2	5	2	0	8	7	0	37	24	2
18	DM	Salim Boukhanchouche	(Algeria)	23	19	1	6	6	1	5	4	0	34	29	2
26	DM	Abdelkrim Namani	(Algeria)	5	3	0	1	0	0	2	0	0	8	3	0
Forwards
7	ST	Bonfils-Caleb Bimenyimana	(Burundi)	10	3	3	2	0	0	0	0	0	12	3	3
10	LW	Ghiles Guenaoui	(Algeria)	2	2	0	0	0	0	2	2	0	4	4	0
12	LW	Khaled Bousseliou	(Algeria)	19	5	0	4	1	1	5	1	0	28	7	1
22	LW	Wale Musa Alli	(Nigeria)	29	19	1	2	0	0	9	6	1	40	25	2
27	RW / LW	Houssam Ghacha	(Algeria)	23	19	6	5	4	1	10	9	1	38	32	8
28	ST	Riad Benayad	(Algeria)	13	9	1	4	3	1	2	2	0	19	14	2
29	RW	Ahmed Khaldi	(Algeria)	10	9	0	5	5	3	2	2	0	17	16	3
30	RW	Mehdi Merghem	(Algeria)	7	6	1	5	4	1	2	2	0	14	12	2
31	ST	Mohamed Ben Mazouz	(Algeria)	11	2	0	3	2	5	5	0	1	19	4	6
32	NA	Samy Bouali	(Algeria)	1	0	0	0	0	0	0	0	0	1	0	0
37	NA	Islam Azegagh	(Algeria)	1	0	0	0	0	0	0	0	0	1	0	0
47	NA	Omar Boularas	(Algeria)	1	0	0	0	0	0	0	0	0	1	0	0
51	RW	Diaa Eddine Mechid	(Algeria)	8	3	0	0	0	0	0	0	0	8	3	0
Players transferred out during the season
~~7~~	LW	Ismail Belkacemi	(Algeria)	11	10	4	2	1	1	6	5	5	19	16	10
~~17~~	ST	Sekou Gassama	(Senegal)	9	7	1	0	0	0	5	3	1	14	10	2
~~13~~	DM	Omar Embarek	(Algeria)	7	1	0	0	0	0	3	2	0	10	3	0
~~24~~	AM	Mohamed Ait El Hadj	(Algeria)	5	2	0	0	0	0	3	0	0	8	2	0
~~20~~	CB	Hocine Dehiri	(Algeria)	6	1	0	0	0	0	2	0	0	8	1	0
Total				30		26	6		16	10		18	46		60

Last updated: 5 July 2025
Source: soccerway.com

=== Disciplinary record ===
As of 11 June 2025

No.	Pos.	Player	Ligue 1			Algerian Cup			Confederation Cup			Total		
No.	Pos.	Player	Yellow card	(yellow card) (yellow-red card)	Red card	Yellow card	(yellow card) (yellow-red card)	Red card	Yellow card	(yellow card) (yellow-red card)	Red card	Yellow card	(yellow card) (yellow-red card)	Red card
25	GK	(Algeria) Oussama Benbot	2	0	0	1	0	0	2	0	0	5	0	0
2	RB	(Algeria) Rayane Mahrouz	2	1	0	0	0	0	0	0	0	2	1	0
4	CB	(Democratic Republic of the Congo) Kévin Mondeko	1	1	1	0	0	0	1	0	0	2	1	1
5	CB	(Algeria) Imadeddine Azzi	4	0	0	1	0	0	2	0	0	7	0	0
21	CB	(Algeria) Adam Alilet	3	0	0	1	0	1	1	0	0	5	0	1
15	LB	(Algeria) Nabil Lamara	2	0	0	0	0	0	0	0	0	2	0	0
19	RB	(Algeria) Saâdi Radouani	2	0	0	0	0	0	1	0	0	3	0	0
23	LB	(Algeria) Ilyes Chetti	0	0	0	0	0	0	1	0	0	1	0	0
6	DM	(Algeria) Oussama Chita	1	0	0	0	0	0	3	0	0	4	0	0
8	DM	(Algeria) Islam Merili	2	0	0	0	0	0	0	0	0	2	0	0
14	DM	(Algeria) Brahim Benzaza	4	0	0	0	0	0	0	0	0	4	0	0
9	AM	(Bolivia) Adalid Terrazas	2	0	0	0	0	0	1	0	0	3	0	0
26	AM	(Algeria) Abdelkrim Namani	1	0	0	0	0	0	0	0	0	1	0	0
18	DM	(Algeria) Salim Boukhanchouche	7	1	0	1	0	0	3	1	0	11	2	0
11	AM	(Democratic Republic of the Congo) Glody Likonza	4	0	0	1	0	0	0	0	0	5	0	0
24	AM	(Algeria) Mohamed Ait El Hadj	1	0	0	0	0	0	0	0	0	1	0	0
22	LW	(Nigeria) Wale Musa Alli	2	0	0	0	0	0	0	0	0	2	0	0
12	LW	(Algeria) Khaled Bousseliou	1	0	0	1	0	0	0	0	0	2	0	0
28	ST	(Algeria) Riad Benayad	1	0	0	0	0	0	0	0	0	1	0	0
29	RW	(Algeria) Ahmed Khaldi	1	0	0	0	0	0	0	0	0	1	0	0
27	RW	(Algeria) Houssam Ghacha	1	0	0	0	0	0	2	0	0	3	0	0
~~7~~	LW	(Algeria) Ismail Belkacemi	1	0	0	0	0	0	0	0	0	1	0	0
~~13~~	DM	(Algeria) Omar Embarek	1	0	0	0	0	0	0	0	0	1	0	0
~~17~~	ST	(Senegal) Sekou Gassama	1	0	0	0	0	0	1	0	0	2	0	0
Total			47	3	1	7	0	1	18	1	0	72	4	2

=== Goalscorers ===
As of 5 July 2025

Includes all competitive matches.

No.	Nat.	Player	Pos.	L1	AC	C3	TOTAL
7	(Algeria)	Ismail Belkacemi	LW	4	1	5	10
27	(Algeria)	Houssam Ghacha	RW	6	1	1	8
31	(Algeria)	Mohamed Ben Mazouz	ST	0	5	1	6
21	(Algeria)	Adam Alilet	CB	1	1	1	3
7	(Burundi)	Bonfils-Caleb Bimenyimana	ST	3	0	0	3
29	(Algeria)	Ahmed Khaldi	RW	0	3	0	3
22	(Nigeria)	Wale Musa Alli	LW	1	0	1	2
17	(Senegal)	Sekou Gassama	ST	1	0	1	2
19	(Algeria)	Saâdi Radouani	RB	0	0	2	2
18	(Algeria)	Salim Boukhanchouche	DM	1	1	0	2
30	(Algeria)	Mehdi Merghem	RW	1	1	0	2
14	(Algeria)	Brahim Benzaza	DM	2	0	0	2
4	(Democratic Republic of the Congo)	Kévin Mondeko	CB	0	0	2	2
2	(Algeria)	Rayane Mahrouz	RB	1	1	0	2
28	(Algeria)	Riad Benayad	ST	1	1	0	2
8	(Algeria)	Islam Merili	DM	0	0	1	1
15	(Algeria)	Nabil Lamara	LB	0	0	1	1
5	(Algeria)	Imadeddine Azzi	CB	1	0	0	1
11	(Democratic Republic of the Congo)	Glody Likonza	AM	1	0	0	1
12	(Algeria)	Khaled Bousseliou	LW	0	1	0	1
Own Goals				2	0	2	4
Totals				26	16	18	60

=== Assists ===
As of 5 July 2025

Includes all competitive matches.

No.	Nat.	Player	Pos.	L1	AC	C3	TOTAL
14	(Algeria)	Brahim Benzaza	DM	2	2	1	5
7	(Algeria)	Ismail Belkacemi	LW	2	0	2	4
27	(Algeria)	Houssam Ghacha	RW	0	2	2	4
22	(Nigeria)	Wale Musa Alli	LW	1	0	2	3
19	(Algeria)	Saâdi Radouani	RB	2	0	1	3
29	(Algeria)	Ahmed Khaldi	RW	2	1	0	3
17	(Algeria)	Haithem Loucif	RB	0	2	0	2
9	(Bolivia)	Adalid Terrazas	AM	2	0	0	2
31	(Algeria)	Mohamed Ben Mazouz	ST	0	1	0	1
15	(Algeria)	Nabil Lamara	LB	0	1	0	1
28	(Algeria)	Riad Benayad	ST	1	0	0	1
12	(Algeria)	Khaled Bousseliou	LW	0	1	0	1
2	(Algeria)	Rayane Mahrouz	RB	0	0	1	1
30	(Algeria)	Mehdi Merghem	RW	0	1	0	1
21	(Algeria)	Adem Alilet	CB	0	1	0	1
Totals				13	11	9	33

=== Penalties ===
Date	Nation	Name	Opponent	Scored?
2 October 2024	(Algeria)	Ismail Belkacemi	US Biskra	Penalty scored
16 November 2024	(Algeria)	Ismail Belkacemi	JS Saoura	Penalty scored
15 December 2024	(Algeria)	Ismail Belkacemi	(Ivory Coast) ASEC Mimosas	Penalty scored
28 January 2025	(Algeria)	Ismail Belkacemi	Paradou AC	Penalty scored
5 February 2025	(Algeria)	Ismail Belkacemi	USM Khenchela	Penalty scored
11 March 2025	(Algeria)	Mehdi Merghem	RC Kouba	Penalty scored
2 April 2025	(Algeria)	Mehdi Merghem	CS Constantine	Penalty missed
9 April 2025	(Algeria)	Adam Alilet	CS Constantine	Penalty scored
15 April 2025	(Algeria)	Adam Alilet	USM El Harrach	Penalty scored
26 April 2025	(Algeria)	Adam Alilet	JS Saoura	Penalty scored
30 April 2025	(Burundi)	Bonfils-Caleb Bimenyimana	ASO Chlef	Penalty scored
17 May 2025	(Algeria)	Houssam Ghacha	Paradou AC	Penalty scored

=== Clean sheets ===
As of 5 July 2025

Includes all competitive matches.

					Clean sheets			
No.	Nat	Name	GP	GA	L 1	AC	C3	Total
1	(Algeria)	Abdelmoumen Sifour	1	4	0	0	0	0
16	(Algeria)	Kamel Soufi	7	6	1	1	0	2
25	(Algeria)	Oussama Benbot	39	21	13	5	5	23
		TOTALS		31	14	6	5	25
