= Brahim Benzaza =

Algerian footballer (born 1997)

Personal information
- Date of birth: 8 April 1997 (age 29)
- Place of birth: Mostaganem, Algeria
- Height: 1.77 m (5 ft 10 in)
- Position: Midfielder

Youth career
- –2017: ES Mostaganem

Senior career*
Years	Team	Apps	(Gls)
2017–2019	ES Mostaganem		
2019–2021	ASO Chlef	49	(3)
2021–2026	USM Alger	104	(8)
- * Club domestic league appearances and goals as of 6 June 2026

Brahim Benzaza (Arabic: ابراهيم بن زازة; born 8 April 1997) is an Algerian professional footballer who plays as a midfielder.

== Career ==
=== USM Alger ===
==== Arrival and continental success ====
On 12 September 2021, USM Alger signed Brahim Benzaza on a two-year contract after he had attracted interest from several clubs. Benzaza made his debut for USM Alger on 30 October 2021, starting in a 4–0 home victory over RC Arbaâ. He scored his first goal for the club in the 11th round of the Ligue 1 season, finding the net in a 4–1 win against NC Magra. On 3 June 2023, Benzaza won the first title of his professional career after helping USM Alger win the 2022–23 CAF Confederation Cup by defeating Young Africans in the final.

At the end of his contract, Benzaza initially decided to join rivals MC Alger before changing his mind following advice from Samir Zaoui, who encouraged him to renew his contract with USM Alger. MC Alger president Hakim Hadj Redjem claimed that he possessed the player's signed agreement for a two-season contract with the club. Despite the controversy, Benzaza eventually renewed his contract with USM Alger for three more seasons, while the Ligue de Football Professionnel (LFP) officially announced that the player was registered with the club until 2026. On 15 September 2023, Benzaza won the CAF Super Cup with USM Alger after defeating Al Ahly SC, securing his second African title with the club in just three months, Benzaza won the penalty that Belaïd converted for the only goal of the match.

==== Difficult season and Algerian Cup triumph ====
During the 2024–25 season, Brahim Benzaza endured a difficult period with USM Alger as his performances declined significantly compared to previous campaigns. Despite remaining a regular starter under coach Nabil Maâloul, the midfielder struggled to regain his best form and became the target of heavy criticism from supporters, particularly on social media. Reports indicated that the pressure affected him mentally, leading to a loss of confidence and uncertainty about his future role within the team.

Benzaza was also dealing with a minor ankle injury and was left out of the squad for some matches, while competition for places increased following the arrival of coach Marcos Paquetá. The resurgence of Islam Merili and Adalid Terrazas, combined with the signing of Mehdi Merghem, made it increasingly difficult for him to secure a guaranteed place in the starting lineup. Despite his struggles, Benzaza remained regarded as an important player because of his technical ability and experience. Despite the difficulties he faced during the season, Benzaza managed to end the campaign on a high note by winning the Algerian Cup. In the final against CR Belouizdad, he started the match and delivered an important assist that contributed directly to his team's victory.

==== Revival, continental glory and departure ====
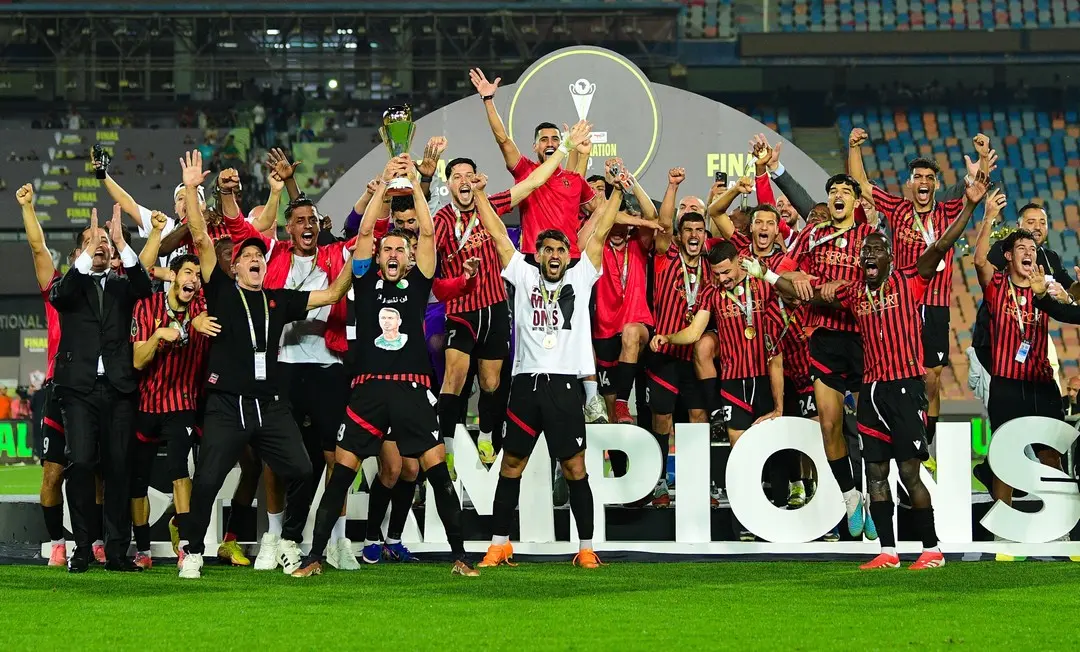
Brahim Benzaza the champions of the 2025–26 CAF Confederation Cup for the second time.

With the appointment of coach Lamine N'Diaye, Benzaza regained his confidence and quickly re-established himself as a key player in the starting lineup of USM Alger. After a difficult 2024–25 season, he managed to bounce back and once again became an important figure in midfield under the Senegalese coach. In the Algerian Cup, Benzaza played a decisive role in helping USM Alger secure the title against CR Belouizdad. He provided a crucial assist for Ahmed Khaldi, who scored the winning goal, allowing the club to lift the trophy for the second consecutive season.

On 16 May 2026, Benzaza added another major achievement to his career by winning his second CAF Confederation Cup title with USM Alger, after a dramatic final victory against Zamalek SC decided by penalties (8–7). This success further confirmed his strong comeback and his key contribution to USM Alger's continental dominance. At the expiration of his contract, Benzaza left USM Alger in the summer of 2026, bringing an end to a five-year spell with the club. During his time with the Red and Blacks, he won five major trophies.

== Career statistics ==
=== Club ===
As of 6 June 2026

Club	Season	League			Cup		Continental		Other		Total	
Club	Season	Division	Apps	Goals	Apps	Goals	Apps	Goals	Apps	Goals	Apps	Goals
ASO Chlef	2019–20	Ligue 1	19	0	2	0	—		—		21	0
ASO Chlef	2020–21	Ligue 1	30	3	—		—		1 (Note: All appearance(s) in Algerian League Cup)	0	31	3
ASO Chlef	Total		49	3	2	0	—		1	0	52	3
USM Alger	2021–22	Ligue 1	24	1	—		—		—		24	1
USM Alger	2022–23	Ligue 1	16	1	1	0	11 (Note: All appearance(s) in CAF Confederation Cup)	0	—		28	1
USM Alger	2023–24	Ligue 1	17	3	3	0	9 (Note: 1 appearance in CAF Super Cup, 8 appearances and 1 goal in CAF Confederation Cup)	1	—		29	4
USM Alger	2024–25	Ligue 1	24	2	5	0	8	0	—		37	2
USM Alger	2025–26	Ligue 1	23	1	6	0	13	2	1 (Note: All appearances in Algerian Super Cup)	0	43	3
USM Alger	Total		104	8	15	0	41	3	1	0	161	11
Career total			153	11	17	0	41	3	2	0	213	14

== Honours ==
USM Alger

- Algerian Cup: 2024–25, 2025–26
- CAF Confederation Cup: 2022–23, 2025–26
- CAF Super Cup: 2023
