= Adalid Terrazas =

Bolivian footballer (born 2000)

Personal information
- Full name: Adalid Terrazas Abasto
- Date of birth: 25 August 2000 (age 26)
- Place of birth: Tiquipaya, Bolivia
- Height: 1.75 m (5 ft 9 in)
- Position: Attacking midfielder

Team information
- Current team: San Antonio Bulo Bulo
- Number: 10

Youth career
- 2009–2017: Municipal Tiquipaya

Senior career*
Years	Team	Apps	(Gls)
2017–2018	Municipal Tiquipaya		
2018–2019	Sport Boys Warnes	4	(0)
2019–2022	Atlético Palmaflor	91	(6)
2023–2024	Always Ready	45	(6)
2024–2025	USM Alger	15	(0)
2025–	San Antonio Bulo Bulo	17	(7)

International career^{‡}
2017	Bolivia U17	2	(0)
2019	Bolivia U20	4	(0)
2024–	Bolivia	5	(0)
- * Club domestic league appearances and goals as of 30 December 2025 ‡ National team caps and goals as of 14 November 2024

Adalid Terrazas Abasto (born 25 August 2000) is a Bolivian professional footballer who plays as an attacking midfielder for Algerian club San Antonio Bulo Bulo and the Bolivia national team.

== Club career ==
Born in Tiquipaya, Terrazas played for hometown side Municipal Tiquipaya before signing for Sport Boys Warnes in 2018. He made his professional – and Primera División – debut on 2 August of that year, in a 3–0 home loss to Royal Pari.

On 11 July 2019, Terrazas moved to Atlético Palmaflor, and helped the side to win the Copa Simón Bolívar at the end of the year. He subsequently became a key unit for the side, scoring four goals and providing 10 assists in the 2022 season. On 9 January 2023, Terrazas signed a three-year contract with Always Ready.

=== USM Alger ===
On August 27, 2024, Adalid Terrazas moved abroad for the first time of his career after being announced at USM Alger in Algeria for three seasons. Terrazas was forced to leave the Bolivian national team's training camp to complete the administrative procedures. Terrazas explained in his statements to the Bolivian media that he had to come to Algeria in person to sign his contract in order to obtain the necessary permit to qualify to play in the CAF Confederation Cup. On September 14, 2024, Terrazas participated in his first match in the CAF Confederation Cup against Stade Tunisien as a starter.

On April 2, 2025, after the end of the first leg of the CAF Confederation Cup quarter-finals, the team's coach Marcos Paquetá, spoke about the reasons for his lack of participation with the team. Paquetá said that the coach who preceded him Nabil Maâloul, did not communicate with him due to the language factor. Paquetá said that he and his assistant speak Spanish and communicate well with him. Paquetá also said that there is a difference in the style of play between South America and Africa. Paquetá added that Terrazas has to adapt and that he has great quality and can offer a lot.

On May 11, 2025, coming off the bench in the second half, Adalid Terrazas played a decisive role in USM Alger’s 2–1 comeback victory over CS Constantine. With his team trailing 1–0, Terrazas completely shifted the momentum within ten minutes, with two assists for Mahrouz and Benayad. Despite being marginalized for most of the season with only three starts Terrazas seized the moment, showing his technical quality, vision, and composure under pressure. At the end of the season, Adalid won the 2024–25 Algerian Cup with his team, despite not being on the pitch for the final due to coaching decisions. Following the triumph, Adalid departed USM Alger after just one season and moved to Bolivia, where he signed with San Antonio Bulo Bulo, bringing his brief stint with the Algerian side to a close.

== International career ==
Terrazas represented Bolivia at under-17 level in the 2017 South American U-17 Championship and at under-20 level in the 2019 South American U-20 Championship. In August 2023, he was called up to the full side for a friendly against Panama.

In June 2024, Terrazas was included in Antônio Carlos Zago's 26-man squad for the 2024 Copa América.

On 17 June 2024, he made his debut against Uruguay in the Copa América.

== Career statistics ==
=== Club ===
As of 23 August 2025

Club	Season	League			Cup		Continental		Other		Total	
Club	Season	Division	Apps	Goals	Apps	Goals	Apps	Goals	Apps	Goals	Apps	Goals
Palmaflor	2020	Bolivian Primera División	23	0	—		—		—		23	0
Palmaflor	2021	Bolivian Primera División	24	2	—		—		—		24	2
Palmaflor	2022	Bolivian Primera División	44	4	—		2 (Note: All appearance(s) in Copa Libertadores)	0	—		46	4
Palmaflor	Total		91	6	—		2	0	—		93	6
Club Always Ready	2023	Bolivian Primera División	27	6	—		2	0	12 (Note: All appearance(s) in Copa de la División Profesional)	2	41	8
Club Always Ready	2024	Bolivian Primera División	18	0	—		12 (Note: 4 appearances and 1 goal in Copa Libertadores, 8 appearances and 2 goals in Copa Sudamericana)	3	—		30	3
Club Always Ready	Total		45	6	—		14	3	—		59	9
USM Alger	2024–25	Ligue 1	15	0	3	0	7 (Note: All appearance(s) in CAF Confederation Cup)	0	—		25	0
San Antonio Bulo Bulo	2025	Bolivian Primera División	5	1	0	0	—		—		5	1
Career total			156	13	3	0	23	3	12	2	194	18

=== International ===
As of matches played 14 November 2024

Appearances and goals by national team and year
National team	Year	Apps	Goals
Bolivia	2024	5	0
Total		5	0

== Honours ==
Atlético Palmaflor

- Copa Simón Bolívar: 2019

USM Alger

- Algerian Cup: 2024–25
