= Diaa Eddine Mechid =

Algerian footballer (born 2006)

Personal information
- Date of birth: 11 June 2006 (age 20)
- Place of birth: Jijel, Algeria
- Height: 1.72 m (5 ft 8 in)
- Position: Right winger

Team information
- Current team: ES Ben Aknoun (on loan from Dynamo Makhachkala)
- Number: 18

Youth career
- AS Sûreté de Jijel
- –2022: JS Djijel
- 2022–2024: USM Alger

Senior career*
Years	Team	Apps	(Gls)
2024–2026	USM Alger	11	(0)
2026–	Dynamo Makhachkala	0	(0)
2026–	→ ES Ben Aknoun (loan)	0	(0)

International career^{‡}
2025–	Algeria A'	1	(0)
- * Club domestic league appearances and goals as of 31 August 2026 ‡ National team caps and goals as of 15 August 2025

Diaa Eddine Mechid (Arabic: ضياء الدين مشيد; born 11 June 2006) is an Algerian professional footballer who plays as a right winger for ES Ben Aknoun, on loan from Russian Premier League club Dynamo Makhachkala.

== Career ==
Diaa Eddine Mechid's footballing career emerged from the USM Alger's reserve team in 2024 and quickly gained attention for his impactful performances with the first team despite limited playing time. Originally from Jijel, Mechid began his footballing journey at AS Sûreté de Jijel before joining JS Djijel.

Mechid later moved to the capital, passing through several youth setups before signing with USM Alger. He made his senior debut in the Algerian Ligue 1 in late April 2025, featuring as a substitute in matches against ASO Chlef and CS Constantine. His technical skills, confidence in one-on-one situations, and creativity on the ball stood out, leading to increased calls for his inclusion in the starting lineup.

In just three appearances totaling 90 minutes, including a 45-minute second-half performance against Paradou AC, Mechid impressed supporters and pundits alike, earning comparisons to fellow Algerian internationals Mohamed Amoura and Anis Hadj Moussa. Left footed and known for his dribbling and attacking flair, Mechid is widely considered one of the most promising young talents in Algerian football.

On 21 May 2025, Mechid has officially extended his commitment to the club until 2029. He appeared in the club's official photos alongside first-team manager Hamza Aït Ouamar, who emphasized the significance of this move within USMA's sporting project.

On 31 January 2026, he joined Russian club Dynamo Makhachkala. Dynamo confirmed the transfer on 6 February 2026.

On 31 August 2026, he joined ES Ben Aknoun, on loan from Dynamo Makhachkala.

== International career ==
Diaa Eddine Mechid has been called up for the first time by coach Madjid Bougherra to join the Algeria A' national football team. Mechid participate in the preparatory training camp ahead of the friendly match against Rwanda, scheduled for 9 June 2025, at Mustapha Tchaker Stadium.

Mechid made his competitive debut for Algeria A' in the 2024 CHAN game against Guinea on 15 August 2025.

== Career statistics ==
=== Club ===
As of 18 March 2026

Appearances and goals by club, season and competition
Club	Season	League			Cup		Total	
Club	Season	Division	Apps	Goals	Apps	Goals	Apps	Goals
USM Alger	2024–25	Ligue 1	7	0	0	0	7	0
USM Alger	2025–26	Ligue 1	4	0	1	0	5	0
USM Alger	Total		11	0	1	0	12	0
Dynamo Makhachkala	2025–26	Russian Premier League	0	0	1	0	1	0
Career total			11	0	2	0	13	0

== Honours ==
USM Alger

- Algerian Cup: 2024–25
