= Rayane Mahrouz =

Algerian footballer (born 2004)

Personal information
- Full name: Rayane Abdelmadjid Mahrouz
- Date of birth: 30 November 2004 (age 21)
- Place of birth: Aïn Témouchent, Algeria
- Height: 1.76 m (5 ft 9 in)
- Position: Right back

Team information
- Current team: USM Alger
- Number: 20

Youth career
- –2024: USM Alger

Senior career*
Years	Team	Apps	(Gls)
2024–	USM Alger	34	(2)
- * Club domestic league appearances and goals as of 6 June 2026

Rayane Mahrouz (Arabic: ريان محروز; born 30 November 2004) is an Algerian footballer who plays for USM Alger in the Algerian Ligue Professionnelle 1.

== Career ==
=== USM Alger ===
==== Breakthrough, first title and injury ====
On 16 January 2025, in the round of 64 of the Algerian Cup against Olympique Magrane, Rayane Mahrouz scored the first goal of his career, and the match ended with a 6–0 victory. On 5 July 2025, in the Algerian Cup final, Mahrouz won the first title of his career with USM Alger by defeating CR Belouizdad, and he was in the starting lineup for the match. On 12 October 2025, USM Alger announced that Rayane Mahrouz was suffering from an adductor injury. He began a period of rest before following a specific rehabilitation program, though the exact duration of his absence was not specified.

In December 2025, Rayan Mahrouz traveled to ASPETAR Hospital in Qatar to undergo medical examinations and a treatment program for a recurring adductor injury. Despite previous treatment and rehabilitation, surgery was being considered to fully resolve the issue. At 21 years old, Mahrouz had been sidelined for several months, after an initially minor injury worsened. Before his setback, Mahrouz had established himself as a starter and one of USM Alger's most promising young players, and his absence represented a significant loss for the team, particularly defensively. He continues specific training in hopes of gradually returning to full fitness and rejoining Abdelhak Benchikha’s tactical setup.

==== Return from injury and continental title ====
During the 2025–26 season, Mahrouz continued his career with USM Alger, but spent an extended period on the sidelines due to injury, missing 140 days of competition. He returned to the squad in late February 2026 after recovering from the injury and gradually resumed playing during the final stages of the season. In the 2025–26 Algerian Cup, Mahrouz was part of USM Alger's campaign to win the title. The club defeated CR Belouizdad in the final, with Mahrouz coming on as a substitute. The victory gave him his second domestic title with the club.

On the continental level, Mahrouz featured for USM Alger in the 2025–26 CAF Confederation Cup, as the club reached the final against Zamalek SC. In the first leg, he came on as a substitute and played only a few minutes, but was involved in the attacking move that resulted in a penalty for USM Alger, from which the team scored the only goal of the match. He did not play in the second leg, which Zamalek won 1–0, leaving the aggregate score tied at 1–1. USM Alger subsequently won the title 8–7 on penalties, giving Mahrouz the first continental title of his career.

In August 2026, Mahrouz returned to USM Alger's training camp in Tabarka, Tunisia, after initially missing the start of the camp. He explained that his absence was due to family issues and apologized to the club's supporters, teammates, coaching staff and management. He also confirmed that USM Alger had rejected an offer from Emirati club Sharjah FC and stated that he intended to remain with the club for the 2026–27 season. On 23 August 2026, USM Alger extended Rayane Mahrouz's contract for two additional seasons as part of the club's efforts to retain key players and maintain squad stability, keeping him at the club until 2029.

== Career statistics ==
=== Club ===
As of 6 June 2026

Club	Season	League			Cup		Continental		Other		Total	
Club	Season	Division	Apps	Goals	Apps	Goals	Apps	Goals	Apps	Goals	Apps	Goals
USM Alger	2024–25	Ligue 1	20	1	4	1	6 (Note: All appearance(s) in CAF Confederation Cup)	0	—		30	2
USM Alger	2025–26	Ligue 1	15	2	2	0	3	0	0 (Note: All appearances in Algerian Super Cup)	0	20	2
USM Alger	2026–27	Ligue 1	0	0	0	0	0	0	0	0	0	0
USM Alger	Total		35	3	6	1	9	0	0	0	50	4
Career total			35	3	6	1	9	0	0	0	50	4

== Honours ==
USM Alger

- Algerian Cup: 2024–25, 2025–26
- CAF Confederation Cup: 2025–26
- CAF Super Cup: 2026
