= Adem Alilet =

Algerian footballer (born 1999)

Personal information
- Full name: Adam Alilet
- Date of birth: 17 January 1999 (age 27)
- Place of birth: Zéralda, Algeria
- Height: 1.85 m (6 ft 1 in)
- Position: Centre-back

Team information
- Current team: Espérance de Tunis
- Number: 28

Youth career
- USM Alger

Senior career*
Years	Team	Apps	(Gls)
2019–2026	USM Alger	88	(7)
2026	Al Ittihad Tripoli	8	(1)
2026–	Espérance de Tunis	0	(0)

International career
2025	Algeria A'	6	(0)
- * Club domestic league appearances and goals as of 7 May 2026

Adem Alilet (Arabic: آدم عليلات; born 17 January 1999) is an Algerian footballer who plays for Tunisian Ligue Professionnelle 1 club Espérance de Tunis.

== Career ==
=== USM Alger ===
In 2019, Adem Alilet was promoted to USM Alger's first team. On 30 October 2019, Adam Alilet made his first league appearance against NC Magra. On June 3, 2023, Alilet won the first title in his football career by winning the 2022–23 CAF Confederation Cup after defeating Young Africans of Tanzania. On August 16, 2023, Adam Alilet renewed his contract for two seasons until 2026 along with nine other players. On 15 September 2023, Alilet won the CAF Super Cup title after winning against Al Ahly, it is the second African title with USM Alger in three months.

=== Al Ittihad ===
On 8 February 2026, Adem Alilet completed a transfer from USM Alger to Libyan club Al Ittihad for a reported fee of €450,000. After six seasons in the Algerian Ligue 1, Alilet moved abroad for the first time in his career, joining Al Ittihad as part of the club's efforts to strengthen its defensive line ahead of domestic and continental competitions.

== International career ==
Adem Alilet has been called up for the first time by coach Madjid Bougherra to join the Algeria A' national football team. Alilet participate in the preparatory training camp ahead of the friendly match against Rwanda, scheduled for June 9, 2025, at Mustapha Tchaker Stadium.

== Career statistics ==
=== Club ===
As of 24 October 2026

Club	Season	League			Cup		Continental		Other		Total	
Club	Season	Division	Apps	Goals	Apps	Goals	Apps	Goals	Apps	Goals	Apps	Goals
USM Alger	2019–20	Algerian Ligue Professionnelle 1	6	0	1	0	2 (Note: Appearance(s) in CAF Champions League)	0	—		9	0
USM Alger	2020–21	Algerian Ligue Professionnelle 1	13	1	—		—		2 (Note: One appearance in Algerian Super Cup, one appearance in Algerian League Cup)	0	15	1
USM Alger	2021–22	Algerian Ligue Professionnelle 1	12	1	—		—		—		12	1
USM Alger	2022–23	Algerian Ligue Professionnelle 1	18	2	1	0	15 (Note: Appearances in CAF Confederation Cup)	2	—		34	4
USM Alger	2023–24	Algerian Ligue Professionnelle 1	14	0	3	0	8 (Note: One appearance in CAF Super Cup, seven appearances in CAF Confederation Cup)	0	—		25	0
USM Alger	2024–25	Algerian Ligue Professionnelle 1	18	0	5	1	8	1	—		31	2
USM Alger	2025–26	Algerian Ligue Professionnelle 1	7	2	3	0	1	1	—		11	3
USM Alger	Total		88	7	13	1	34	3	2	0	138	8
Al Ittihad Tripoli	2025–26	Libyan Premier League	8	1	0	0	—		—		8	1
Espérance de Tunis	2026–27	Tunisian Ligue Professionnelle 1	0	0	0	0	1	0	0	0	1	0
Career total			96	8	13	1	35	3	2	0	147	9

== Honours ==
USM Alger

- Algerian Cup: 2024–25
- CAF Confederation Cup: 2022–23
- CAF Super Cup: 2023
