= Mohamed Ben Mazouz =

Algerian footballer

Personal information
- Full name: Mohamed Said Ben Mazouz
- Date of birth: 22 March 2004 (age 22)
- Place of birth: Béni Messous, Algeria
- Position: Forward

Team information
- Current team: MO Béjaïa
- Number: 24

Youth career
- –2024: USM Alger

Senior career*
Years	Team	Apps	(Gls)
2024–2025	USM Alger	10	(0)
2025–2026	ES Sahel	8	(1)
2025–	MO Béjaïa		

International career^{‡}
2022	Algeria U18	2	(0)
- * Club domestic league appearances and goals as of 11 September 2026 ‡ National team caps and goals as of 1 October 2025

Mohamed Ben Mazouz (Arabic: محمد بن معزوز; born 22 March 2004) is an Algerian footballer who plays for MO Béjaïa.

== USM Alger ==
In the 2024–25 season, Mohamed Ben Mazouz was promoted to the first team. Before that, on June 11, 2024, Ben Mazouz played his first match with USM Alger against US Souf in the Ligue 1. On January 12, 2025, Ben Mazouz scored the equalizer goal against ASEC Mimosas in the CAF Confederation Cup, the first in his football career. On January 16, 2025, in the round of 64 of the Algerian Cup against Olympique Magrane, Mohamed Ben Mazouz scored his first hat-trick in his football career in 6–0 victory. On March 27, 2025, Ben Mazouz returned to the starting lineup against CR Témouchent in the Algerian Cup, where he scored a brace to lead them to the semi-finals. At the end of the 2024–25 season, Ben Mazouz won the Algerian Cup with USM Alger, although he did not feature in the final match due to a coaching decision.

== Étoile du Sahel ==
On 31 August 2025, Ben Mazouz, regarded as a pure product of USM Alger's youth academy, signed a two-year contract with Étoile du Sahel in Tunisia, running until 2027. Ben Mazouz joined the Sousse-based club, former team of Baghdad Bounedjah, where he faces competition from two Senegalese forwards and a Malian striker.

== MO Béjaïa ==
On 24 August 2026, he joined MO Béjaïa.

== Career statistics ==
=== Club ===
As of 1 October 2025

Club	Season	League			Cup		Continental		Other		Total	
Club	Season	Division	Apps	Goals	Apps	Goals	Apps	Goals	Apps	Goals	Apps	Goals
USM Alger	2023–24	Algerian Ligue 1	1	0	—		—		—		1	0
USM Alger	2024–25	Algerian Ligue 1	10	0	2	5	5 (Note: All appearance(s) in CAF Confederation Cup)	1	—		17	6
Total			11	0	2	5	5	1	—		18	6
Étoile du Sahel	2025–26	Tunisian Ligue 1	4	1	—		—		—		4	1
Career total			15	1	2	5	5	1	0	0	22	7

== Honours ==
USM Alger

- Algerian Cup: 2024–25
