= Mehdi Merghem =

Algerian footballer (born 1997)

- Merghem with Dundee United in 2026

Personal information
- Date of birth: 19 July 1997 (age 29)
- Place of birth: Aubervilliers, France
- Height: 1.85 m (6 ft 1 in)
- Position: Right winger

Team information
- Current team: Dundee United
- Number: 7

Youth career
- –2015: Châteauroux

Senior career*
Years	Team	Apps	(Gls)
2015–2016	Châteauroux II	15	(2)
2016–2019	Châteauroux	56	(1)
2019–2020	Guingamp II	2	(1)
2019–2024	Guingamp	97	(10)
2020–2021	→ Nancy (loan)	8	(0)
2024–2025	Farense	12	(0)
2025	USM Alger	7	(1)
2025–2026	JS Kabylie	14	(1)
2026	Bastia	8	(0)
2026–	Dundee United	5	(0)
Total		224	(16)

International career^{‡}
2025–	Algeria A'	6	(0)
- * Club domestic league appearances and goals as of 5 September 2026 ‡ National team caps and goals as of 23 August 2025

Mehdi Merghem (Arabic: مهدي مرغم; Tamazight: ⵎⴻⵀⴷⵉ ⵎⴻⵔⴳⵀⴻⵎ; born 19 July 1997) is a professional footballer who plays as a right winger for Scottish Premiership club Dundee United. Born in France, he represents Algeria internationally.

== Career ==
Merghem made his professional debut for Châteauroux in a 3–2 Ligue 2 win over Brest on 27 July 2017.

On 28 August 2025, he signed a two-year contract with JS Kabylie.

On 3 February 2026, he joined Bastia.

On 12 July 2026, Merghem moved to Dundee United in Scotland on a two-year deal.

== Personal life ==
Born in France, Merghem holds French and Algerian nationalities.

== Honours ==
LB Châteauroux

- Championnat National: 2016–17

EA Guingamp

- Coupe de la Ligue runner-up: 2018–19

USM Alger

- Algerian Cup: 2024–25
