= Marcos Paquetá =

Brazilian football manager (born 1958)

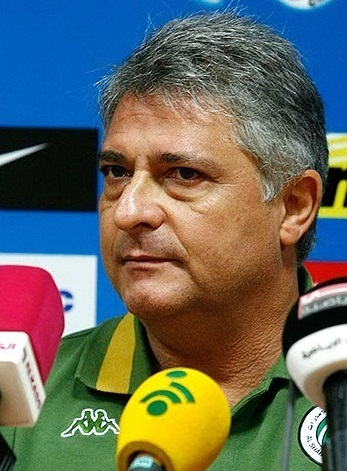

Personal information
- Full name: Marcos César Dias de Castro
- Date of birth: 27 August 1958 (age 68)
- Place of birth: Rio de Janeiro, Brazil
- Position: Central midfielder

Team information
- Current team: USM Alger (head coach)

Youth career
- 1973–1977: America-RJ
- 1978: Vasco da Gama

Senior career*
Years	Team	Apps	(Gls)
1979–1981	Vasco da Gama		

Managerial career
- 1987: America-RJ
- 1988–1989: Al Shabab
- 1990–1998: Flamengo (youth)
- 1995: Flamengo (interim)
- 1999–2000: Fluminense (youth)
- 2001–2003: Flamengo (youth)
- 2003: Flamengo (interim)
- 2003: Brazil U17
- 2003: Brazil U20
- 2004: Flamengo (youth)
- 2004: Avaí
- 2004–2005: Al-Hilal
- 2005–2007: Saudi Arabia
- 2007: Al-Hilal
- 2007–2009: Al-Gharafa
- 2009–2010: Al-Rayyan
- 2010–2012: Libya
- 2012–2014: Al Shabab
- 2014–2015: Al-Gharafa
- 2015–2016: Zamalek
- 2017–2018: Al-Shorta
- 2018: Pune City
- 2018: Botafogo
- 2019: Al-Muharraq
- 2021–2022: CR Belouizdad
- 2022–2023: Hassania Agadir
- 2023–2024: CR Belouizdad
- 2025–: USM Alger
- * Club domestic league appearances and goals

Marcos César Dias de Castro (born 27 August 1958), known as Marcos Paquetá, is a former Brazilian footballer who played as a central midfielder and last managed Algerian club CR Belouizdad.

== Career ==
Born in Rio de Janeiro but raised in the Paquetá Island, he started his career at hometown side America's youth setup. In 1978 he moved to Vasco da Gama, and spent his first season with the under-20 squad before being promoted to the first team. He eventually retired in 1981, aged just 23.

Paquetá started his managerial career in 1987, while in charge of first club America. In the following year he moved abroad for the first time, taking over UAE Pro League side Al Shabab. He left the club in 1989, and was subsequently appointed manager of Flamengo's youth setup.

In 1995, Paquetá was an interim manager of the first team for one match, after the arrival of Edinho. He remained as a youth team manager until 1998, and moved to Fluminense the following year, also in charge of the youth categories.

In 2001 Paquetá returned to Fla, and was again interim in 2003 after the dismissal of Nelsinho Baptista. Later in that year, he led the Brazil under-17 side to the title of the FIFA U-17 World Cup, and repeated the feat with the under-20s only months later.

Paquetá returned to Flamengo for the 2004 Copa São Paulo de Futebol Júnior, and was subsequently in charge of Avaí. On 17 December 2005, after impressing as manager of Al-Hilal, he was named manager of Saudi Arabia national team, being in charge of the side during the 2006 FIFA World Cup.

In 2007, after a short spell back at Al-Hilal, Paquetá signed with Qatar Stars League side Al-Gharafa, leading them to the league title twice and the Sheikh Jassem Cup. He was head coach of Al-Rayyan for a season, and in July 2010, he signed a two-year contract to become manager of the Libya national team.

In June 2012, Paquetá signed a contract to take over Al Shabab for a second time in his career. He left the club in 2014, and returned for a second spell as manager of Al-Gharafa on 7 June of that year, signing a two-year deal.

In December 2015, Paquetá signed a contract with Egyptian club Zamalek SC, but was sacked the following 3 January. In October 2017, he took over Iraqi side Al-Shorta.

On 31 May 2018, Paquetá was appointed manager of Indian Super League side FC Pune City, but terminated his contract less than a month later. On 26 June, he was presented as manager of Botafogo.

Paquetá was sacked from Bota on 1 August 2018, after losing four of his five games in charge.

On 23 September 2021, Paquetá was appointed manager of CR Belouizdad. On 26 June 2022, he left CR Belouizdad.

On 28 July 2022, Paquetá was appointed manager of Hassania Agadir. On 9 March 2023, Paquetá was sacked from Hassania Agadir.

On 15 October 2023, Paquetá returned to CR Belouizdad.

== Managerial statistics ==
As of 27 June 2022

Team	Nat	From	To	Record				
Team	Nat	From	To	G	W	D	L	Win %
Al-Shorta	Iraq	8 September 2017	23 March 2018	19	11	6	2	57.89
Botafogo	Brazil	26 June 2018	1 August 2018	5	1	0	4	20.00
CR Belouizdad	Algeria	22 September 2021		86	46	22	18	53.49
Total				70	38	16	16	54.29

== Honours ==
=== As a manager ===
CR Belouizdad

- Algerian Ligue Professionnelle 1: 2021-22
- Algerian Cup: 2023–24
