= 2024–25 Algerian Cup =

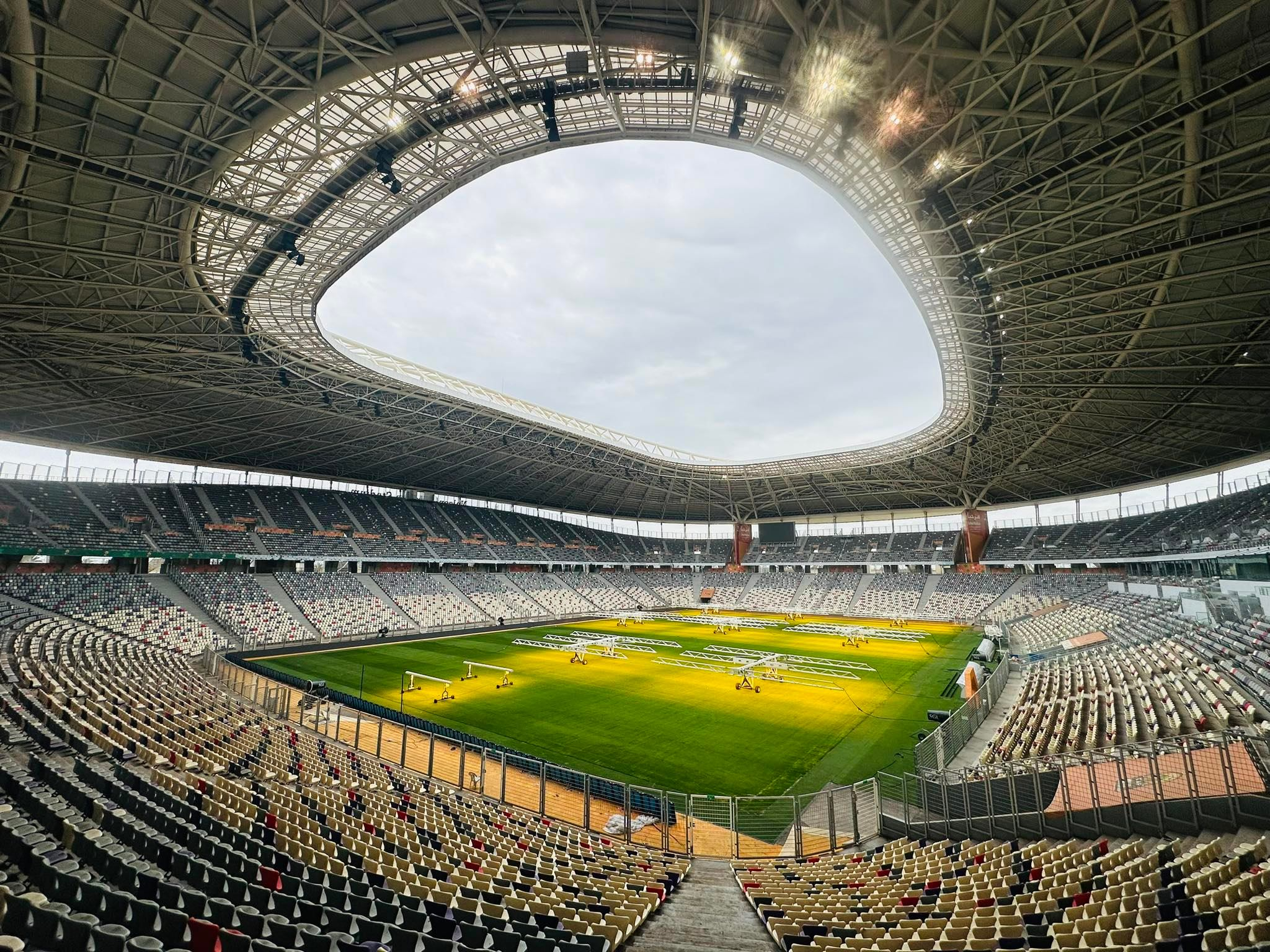
- The Nelson Mandela Stadium hosted the final

Tournament details
- Country: Algeria
- Dates: 30 December 2024 – 5 July 2025
- Teams: 64 (as of first national round)

Final positions
- Champions: USM Alger
- Runners-up: CR Belouizdad

Tournament statistics
- Matches played: 63
- Goals scored: 126 (2 per match)
- Top goal scorer(s): Mohamed Ben Mazouz (5 goals)
- All statistics correct as of 5 July 2025.

The 2024–25 Algerian Cup (Arabic: كأس الجزائر 2024-25) is the 58th edition of the Algerian Cup. It is sponsored by Mobilis and known as the Mobilis Algerian Cup for sponsorship purposes. The winners will qualify to the 2025–26 CAF Confederation Cup. CR Belouizdad are the defending champions.

== Teams ==
Round	Clubs remaining	Clubs involved	Winners from previous round	New entries this round	Leagues entering at this round
Regional rounds
First round	-	-	-	-	Ligue de Football de la Wilaya; Ligue Régional II; Ligue Régional I
Second round	-	-	-	-	Inter-Régions Division
Third round	-	-	-	-	none
Fourth round	-	-	-	-	Algerian Ligue 2
Fifth round	-	-	-	-	none
National rounds
Round of 64	64	64	48	16	Algerian Ligue Professionnelle 1
Round of 32	32	32	32	none	none
Round of 16	16	16	16	none	none
Quarter-finals	8	8	8	none	none
Semi-finals	4	4	4	none	none
Final	2	2	2	none	none

== Round of 64 ==
The draw was made on 12 December 2024.

3 January 2025 1	USM Bel Abbès (3)	2–0	JS Azazga (3)	Sidi Bel Abbès
15:00	Lebid 29'; Menhoum 57'	Report		Stadium: 24 February Stadium; Referee: Mohamed Benzohra

3 January 2025 2	CR Témouchent (2)	3–1 (a.e.t.)	CA Batna (2)	Aïn Témouchent
14:30	Mahammedi 70', 92'; Kechar 119'	Report	Benyahia 64'	Stadium: Omar Oucief Stadium; Referee: Radouane Allou

3 January 2025 3	ES Bouakeul (3)	0–2	CRB Beni Tamou (3)	Batna
15:30		Report	Bouhadja 5'; Zedri 63'	Stadium: 1 November 1954 Stadium; Referee: Abdennour Khalfallah

3 January 2025 4	USM Blida (3)	0–0 (a.e.t.) (4–5 p)	IRB Sedrata (3)	Blida
14:30		Report		Stadium: Brakni Brothers Stadium; Referee: Mohamed Beloufa

4 January 2025 5	RC Kouba (2)	2–0	GC Mascara (2)	Kouba
14:00	Kermiche 43'; Yacef 57'	Report		Stadium: Mohamed Benhaddad Stadium; Referee: Naim Bouara

2 January 2025 6	JS Saoura (1)	2–1 (a.e.t.)	USM Khenchela (1)	Béchar
15:00	Bentaleb 97'; Taib 114'	Report	Bakir 118'	Stadium: 20 August 1955 Stadium; Referee: Smail Hamlat

16 January 2025 7	USM Alger (1)	6–0	O Magrane (2)	Algiers
19:00	Ben Mazouz 31', 71', 86'; Bousseliou 36'; Boukhanchouche 74'; Mahrouz 90+2'	Report		Stadium: Stade du 5 Juillet; Referee: Ghada Mehat

4 January 2025 8	NC Magra (1)	1–0 (a.e.t.)	MB Rouissat (2)	Magra
14:00	Bouzekri 100'	Report		Stadium: Boucheligue Brothers Stadium; Referee: Djamel Zenati

4 January 2025 9	ICS Tlemcen (3)	1–3	USM Sétif (3)	Tlemcen
15:00	Belmokhtar 4'	Report	Maouassi 29'; Berrouche 75', 87'	Stadium: Colonel Lotfi Stadium; Referee: Mansour Mehal

4 January 2025 10	US Béchar Djedid (2)	2–3 (a.e.t.)	MC Oran (1)	Béchar
15:00	Kihel 59'; Saadi 115'	Report	Sylla 32'; Aribi 105', 119'	Stadium: 20 August 1955 Stadium; Attendance: 8,000; Referee: Mohamed Belkebir

3 January 2025 11	ES Guelma (3)	0–2	JS Kabylie (1)	Guelma
14:30		Report	Berkane 32', 40'	Stadium: Boudjemaa Souidani Stadium; Referee: Tayeb Benyabka

4 January 2025 12	USM El Harrach (2)	1–0	NA Hussein Dey (2)	Mohammedia
14:00	Ogbi 6'	Report		Stadium: 1 November 1954 Stadium; Referee: Alaa Bouab

4 January 2025 13	IRB Nezla (3)	0–1 (a.e.t.)	ESM Koléa (2)	Touggourt
14:00		Report	Lakroum 91'	Stadium: Colonel Mohamed Chabani Stadium; Referee: Sahraoui Sassi

6 January 2025 14	US Biskra (1)	1–0	SC Mécheria (2)	Biskra
16:00	Bourahla 90'	Report		Stadium: 18 February Stadium; Referee: Abderrahmane Sahraoui

3 January 2025 15	ES Mostaganem (1)	1–1 (5–4 p)	WAB Tissemssilt (3)	Mostaganem
16:00	Belaribi 83'	Report	Goushi 60'	Stadium: Mohamed Bensaïd Stadium; Referee: Mehadji Tayeb Bouderbal

3 January 2025 16	JSM Tiaret (2)	4–0	ES Theniet El Abed (5)	Tiaret
14:30	Faktour 14'; Chouki 43'; Triai 50'; Cherif 90'	Report		Stadium: Ahmed Kaïd Stadium; Referee: Antar Zakaria

7 January 2025 17	CR Belouizdad (1)	1–0	CR Zaouia (3)	Algiers
19:00	Chaabi 43'	Report		Stadium: Stade du 5 Juillet; Referee: Mohamed Chaoubi

30 December 2024 18	ES Ben Aknoun (2)	0–3	MC Alger (1)	Algiers
19:00		Report	Bayazid 3', 43'; Zunon 19'	Stadium: Stade du 5 Juillet; Referee: Abdelali Ibrir

4 January 2025 19	US Chaouia (2)	1–0	WA Mostaganem (2)	Oum El Bouaghi
14:00	Belhamel 84'	Report		Stadium: Hassouna Zerdani Stadium; Referee: Azeddine Tair

3 January 2025 20	IRB El Kerma (3)	2–1	ASO Chlef (1)	Oran
14:30	Boubaker 31'; Balegh 85'	Report	Hamra 74' (pen.)	Stadium: Ahmed Zabana Stadium; Referee: Oussama Mekfoudji

3 January 2025 21	USM Annaba (2)	2–1 (a.e.t.)	CRB Aïn Yakout (3)	Annaba
15:00	Belabbas 47'; Laribi 117'	Report	Bouaziz 19'	Stadium: 19 May 1956 Stadium; Referee: Anis Moudjeb

3 January 2025 22	MO Béjaïa (3)	2–1	AS Khroub (2)	Béjaïa
15:00	Betka 9'; Bendif 78'	Report	Lamrani 50'	Stadium: Maghrebi Unity Stadium; Referee: Hamza Bouslimani

6 January 2025 23	CRB Sendjas (5)	1–3	Paradou AC (1)	Chlef
14:30	Houraiba 12'	Report	Tahar 33'; Ait Abdessalem 57', 90+3'	Stadium: Mohamed Boumezrag Stadium; Referee: Haitham Ghouti

3 January 2025 24	JS Haï Djebel (3)	1–0 (a.e.t.)	ORB Oued Fodda (3)	Mohammedia
14:30	Tetbirt 93'	Report		Stadium: 1 November 1954 Stadium; Referee: Mohammed Bouchaker

3 January 2025 25	NRB Touggourt (3)	2–0	RC Bougaa (3)	Touggourt
14:30	Saadallah 41'; Kouidri 68'	Report		Stadium: Colonel Mohamed Chabani Stadium; Referee: Abbas Bebba

4 January 2025 26	Nasr El Fedjoudj (3)	0–1	MC El Bayadh (1)	Guelma
14:00		Report	Boudechicha 85'	Stadium: Boudjemaa Souidani Stadium; Referee: Mohamed Milia

5 February 2025 27	Olympique Akbou (1)	1–0	CS Constantine (1)	Béjaïa
15:00	Lachhab 3'	Report		Stadium: Maghrebi Unity Stadium; Referee: Houssam Benyahia

4 January 2025 28	MJ Arzew (4)	2–1 (a.e.t.)	MCH El Abiodh Sidi Cheikh (4)	Arzew
14:30	Semati 12', 110'	Report	Gourari 10'	Stadium: Menaouer Kerbouci Stadium; Referee: Oussama Serir

4 January 2025 29	JSM Béjaïa (3)	2–1	USB Hassi R'mel (3)	Béjaïa
14:00	Amokrane 34'; Djahnit 61'	Report	Youcef 11'	Stadium: Maghrebi Unity Stadium; Referee: Mustapha Tiaiba

4 January 2025 30	CA Sidi Abdelmoumen (3)	0–2	A El Eulma (3)	Mascara
14:00	Sebti 81'; Merah 90+2'	Report		Stadium: Aoued Meflah Stadium; Referee: Bilal Bendjahene

3 January 2025 31	MC El Eulma (3)	0–2	ES Sétif (1)	El Eulma
16:00		Report	Boukerma 34' (pen.); Bouguerri 89'	Stadium: Messaoud Zeghar Stadium; Referee: Said Aouina

4 January 2025 32	MB Barika (3)	1–2	JS Djijel (2)	Barika
14:00	Mammeri 81'	Report	Belal 27'; Guettout 28'	Stadium: Mohamed Ghalmi Stadium; Referee: Alaeddine Selmi

== Round of 32 ==
10 January 2025 33	USM Bel Abbès (3)	0–1	CR Témouchent (2)	Sidi Bel Abbès
15:00		Report	Mahammedi 4'	Stadium: 24 February Stadium; Referee: Zakaria Antar

11 January 2025 34	CRB Beni Tamou (3)	1–0	IRB Sedrata (3)	Boufarik
14:00	Zedri 115'	Report		Stadium: Mohamed Reggaz Stadium; Referee: Naim Bouara

14 January 2025 35	RC Kouba (2)	2–1	JS Saoura (1)	Kouba
14:00	Ghodbane 29', 44'	Report	Souibaâh 73'	Stadium: Mohamed Benhaddad Stadium; Referee: Djamel Zenati

9 February 2025 36	USM Alger (1)	1–0	NC Magra (1)	Algiers
19:00	Belkacemi 47'	Report		Stadium: Stade du 5 Juillet; Referee: Ayoub Belhachemi

11 January 2025 37	USM Sétif (3)	0–1	MC Oran (1)	Sétif
15:00		Report	Dahar 53' (pen.)	Stadium: 8 May 1945 Stadium; Referee: Oussama Mekfoudji

10 January 2025 38	JS Kabylie (1)	0–1	USM El Harrach (2)	Tizi Ouzou
17:00		Report	Ogbi 38' (pen.)	Stadium: Hocine Aït Ahmed Stadium; Referee: Abdelali Ibrir

11 January 2025 39	ESM Koléa (2)	0–0 (2–4 p)	US Biskra (1)	Koléa
14:00		Report		Stadium: Mohamed Mouaz Stadium; Referee: Mehadji Tayeb Bouderbal

11 January 2025 40	ES Mostaganem (1)	2–1 (a.e.t.)	JSM Tiaret (2)	Mostaganem
16:00	Hitala 18', 120'	Report	Hamadi 54'	Stadium: Mohamed Bensaïd Stadium; Referee: Smail Hamlat

20 February 2025 41	CR Belouizdad (1)	1–0	MC Alger (1)	Algiers
20:00	Mahious 47'	Report		Stadium: Stade du 5 Juillet; Referee: Houssam Benyahia

11 January 2025 42	US Chaouia (2)	2–1	IRB El Kerma (3)	Oum El Bouaghi
14:00	Messai 26'; Beldjilali 56'	Report	Balegh 87'	Stadium: Hassouna Zerdani Stadium; Referee: Mohamed Milia

11 January 2025 43	USM Annaba (2)	0–1	MO Béjaïa (3)	Annaba
17:00		Report	Bendif 64'	Stadium: 19 May 1956 Stadium; Referee: Youcef Gamouh

12 January 2025 44	Paradou AC (1)	2–2 (a.e.t.) (3–4 p)	JS Haï Djebel (3)	Algiers
14:30	Yattou 24'; Kermiche 56'	Report	Nedjah 51'; Guerzou 76'	Stadium: Stade du 5 Juillet; Referee: Mohamed Bouteraa

10 January 2025 45	NRB Touggourt (3)	0–2	MC El Bayadh (1)	Touggourt
14:30		Report	Chahrour 90' (pen.); Sediri 90+3'	Stadium: Ali La Pointe Stadium; Referee: Abderrahmane Sahraoui

9 February 2025 46	Olympique Akbou (1)	1–0	MJ Arzew (4)	Béjaïa
18:00	Gherbi 64'	Report		Stadium: Maghrebi Unity Stadium; Referee: Zouhir Mansari

10 January 2025 47	JSM Béjaïa (3)	0–1 (a.e.t.)	A El Eulma (3)	Béjaïa
15:00		Report	Bouaoune 95'	Stadium: Maghrebi Unity Stadium; Referee: Mohamed Beloufa

10 January 2025 48	ES Sétif (1)	1–0	JS Djijel (2)	Sétif
16:00	Boukerma 90+7' (pen.)	Report		Stadium: 8 May 1945 Stadium; Referee: Ayoub Belhachemi

== Round of 16 ==
7 February 2025 49	CR Témouchent (2)	1–0	CRB Beni Tamou (3)	Aïn Témouchent
15:00	Mahammedi 57'	Report		Stadium: Omar Oucief Stadium; Referee: Mohamed Milia

11 March 2025 50	RC Kouba (2)	0–1	USM Alger (1)	Kouba
22:00		Report	Merghem 70' (pen.)	Stadium: Mohamed Benhaddad Stadium; Referee: Hamza Bouslimani

7 February 2025 51	MC Oran (1)	0–1	USM El Harrach (2)	Bir El Djir
18:00		Report	Berrabeh 55'	Stadium: Miloud Hadefi Stadium; Attendance: 37 000; Referee: Bilel Soltani

6 February 2025 52	US Biskra (1)	1–2 (a.e.t.)	ES Mostaganem (1)	Biskra
16:00	Dadache 42'	Report	Belkhadem 13', 114'	Stadium: 18 February Stadium; Referee: Abdelali Ibrir

12 March 2025 53	CR Belouizdad (1)	4–2	US Chaouia (2)	Algiers
22:00	Mahious 34', 51' (pen.), 65'; Boussouar 86'	Report	Mellouk 5'; Merri 89'	Stadium: Stade du 5 Juillet; Referee: Zouhir Mansri

7 February 2025 54	MO Béjaïa (3)	2–0	JS Haï Djebel (3)	Béjaïa
15:00	Issead 15'; Yaya 31'	Report		Stadium: Maghrebi Unity Stadium; Referee: Haithem Ghouti

11 March 2025 55	MC El Bayadh (1)	0–0 (6–5 p)	Olympique Akbou (1)	El Bayadh
15:30		Report		Stadium: Zakaria Medjdoub Stadium; Referee: Oussama Mekfoudji
	Penalties
	El Moudene (penalty missed); Yaiche (penalty scored); Belaribi (penalty scored); El Orfi (penalty scored); Chahrour (penalty missed) ? (penalty scored); Barkat (penalty scored); Yerou (penalty missed); Salhi (penalty scored)		(penalty scored) Rahmouni; (penalty scored) Bouhalfaya; (penalty missed) Bitam; (penalty scored) Hathat; (penalty missed) Ghanem; (penalty scored) Sabri; (penalty scored) Hamadouche; (penalty missed) Klileche; (penalty missed) Bachir

6 February 2025 56	A El Eulma (3)	0–1	ES Sétif (1)	El Eulma
17:00		Report	Bouhmidi 42'	Stadium: Messaoud Zeghar Stadium; Referee: Mohamed Bouteraa

== Quarter-finals ==
The quarter-final games were played at neutral venues.

27 March 2025 QF1	CR Témouchent (2)	0–5	USM Alger (1)	Oran
22:00		Report	Khaldi 24', 66'; Ben Mazouz 42', 71'; Ghacha 90'	Stadium: Miloud Hadefi Stadium; Referee: Youcef Taieb Bouderbal; VAR: Yahia Dehar

26 March 2025 QF2	USM El Harrach (2)	1–1 (a.e.t.) (2–0 p)	ES Mostaganem (1)	Algiers
22:20	Abid 26'	Report	Mesmoudi 62'	Stadium: Stade du 5 Juillet; Referee: Alaa Bouab; VAR: Akram Mechairia
	Penalties
	Chouki (penalty scored); Ferhat (penalty missed); Bouderbala (penalty scored)		(penalty missed) Tamer; (penalty missed) Meddah; (penalty missed) Hamri; (penalty missed) Hitala

28 March 2025 QF3	CR Belouizdad (1)	1–0	MO Béjaïa (3)	Tizi Ouzou
22:00	Mayo 55'	Report		Stadium: Hocine Aït Ahmed Stadium; Referee: Fateh Harkat; VAR: Youcef Gamouh

27 March 2025 QF4	MC El Bayadh (1)	1–0 (a.e.t.)	ES Sétif (1)	Baraki
22:00	Boudechicha 102'	Report		Stadium: Nelson Mandela Stadium; Referee: Anes Azrine; VAR: Redouane Allou

== Semi-finals ==
The semi-final games were played at neutral venues.

15 April 2025 SF1	USM Alger (1)	1–0 (a.e.t.)	USM El Harrach (2)	Algiers
20:45	Alilet 105+1' (pen.)	Report		Stadium: Stade du 5 Juillet; Referee: Yahia Dehar; VAR: Fateh Harkat

15 April 2025 SF2	CR Belouizdad (1)	1–0	MC El Bayadh (1)	Oran
18:00	Meziane 46'	Report		Stadium: Miloud Hadefi Stadium; Referee: Rafik Aouina; VAR: Nabil Boukhalfa

== Final ==
5 July 2025 Final	USM Alger (1)	2–0	CR Belouizdad (1)	Baraki
17:00	Benayad 9'; Khaldi 13'	Report		Stadium: Nelson Mandela Stadium; Referee: Yahia Dehar

== Statistics ==
=== Top scorers ===
Rank	Goalscorer	Club	Goals
1	(Algeria) Mohamed Ben Mazouz	USM Alger	5
2	(Algeria) Aymen Mahious	CR Belouizdad	4
2	(Algeria) Abderrahmane Mahammedi	CR Témouchent	4

Updated to games played on 5 July 2025.

== See also ==
- 2024–25 Algerian Ligue Professionnelle 1
- 2024–25 Algerian Ligue 2
