= 2023–24 USM Alger season =

USM Alger
2023–24 season
- Owner: Groupe SERPORT
- Administration: Sid Ahmed Arab (President) (until 4 January 2024); Hacen Hassina (President) (from 4 January 2024); Taoufik Korichi (Sporting director) (from 16 July 2023) (until 27 May 2024)
- Head coach: Abdelhak Benchikha (until 9 October 2023); Farid Zemiti (c) (from 9 October 2023) (until 17 October 2023); Juan Carlos Garrido (from 17 October 2023)
- Stadium: Omar Benrabah Stadium; Stade du 5 Juillet
- Ligue 1: 4th
- Algerian Cup: Semi-finals
- Confederation Cup: Semi-finals
- CAF Super Cup: Winners
- Top goalscorer: League: Ismaïl Belkacemi (14 goals); All: Ismaïl Belkacemi (17 goals)
- Biggest win: USM Alger 8–0 MB Rouissat
- Biggest defeat: USM Alger 1–5 Paradou AC
Home colours	Away colours	Third colours

The 2023–24 season, is USM Alger's 46th season and the club's 29th consecutive season in the top flight of Algerian football. In addition to the domestic league, USM Alger are participating in this season's editions of the Algerian Cup and the CAF Confederation Cup. As the reigning Confederation Cup champions, USMA contested the CAF Super Cup.

== Review ==
=== Background ===
This season is the very first time since 2010–11 without Mohamed Lamine Zemmamouche, who announced his retirement after winning CAF Confederation Cup final, therefore leaving USM Alger after 18 years of his career, being the most caped player in club's history with 405 matches and having won 10 trophies altogether since his debut. On June 18, 2023 USM Alger which had been equipped by Kappa since 2020, signed with another Italian firm it is Macron. The club's management has signed a three-year contract with its new equipment supplier, which should offer it better material and financial endowment. on the same day USM Alger has just signed an agreement with Espérance de Bab El Oued, a second division women's team, to wear the red and black colors this season. Being in the obligation to have a women's team to be able to register in African competition this season with the last deadline June 20. The renewable agreement runs for one year from July 1, 2023 to June 30, 2024.

On July 16, 2023, the President and General Manager of "Groupe SERPORT" Abdelkarim Harkati, and the Chairman of the Board of Directors of USM Alger Company Sid Ahmed Arab, held a meeting in preparation for the challenges awaiting the club locally and continually. Ensuring that all financial capabilities are provided and studying the recruitment and demobilized file. During the meeting the position of general manager in the sports company was abolished and the position of sports manager was created. Therefore, Arab appointed Taoufik Korichi as the new sporting director and appointed the former general manager Reda Abdouche as an advisor of the president. On the same day, Abdelhak Benchikha stated that he remained in the club and that he started recruiting and that there were players who agreed with them to sign and others who renewed their contracts, as well as the agreement on the place of training and when he would start.

=== Pre-season ===
The former sporting director of USM Alger Antar Yahya, won his case in the Court of Arbitration for Sport after being unfairly and illegally dismissed by the previous administration. The club is now obligated to pay all its compensation in addition to the late payment fine, amounting to 435 thousand euros or approximately 7 billion centems. USM Alger will carry out the inter-season internship, in Tunisia, more precisely in the city of Tabarka. It is with this in mind that the Rouge et Noir will begin their rally on August 17, which will last until September 2. The first friendly match was against CA Bizertin, where the team entered each half with a different line-up, and the match ended with a great victory for USMA with five goals scored by Fettouhi on two occasions, Benzaza, Ait El Hadj and Merili. On August 26, the Confederation of African Football (CAF) has communicated the date of the course of CAF Super Cup final against Al Ahly the CAF Champions League champion. This match will take place on September 15 at the King Fahd Sports City in Taif, Saudi Arabia. On August 7, 2023, the club sportif amateur (CSA) submitted a notice to deposit a new mark to the Institut national algérien de la propriété industrielle (INAPI) to change the club’s logo and remove the symbol of the city of Algiers from the logo in accordance with the decision issued by the court, Saïd Allik president of the CSA filed a complaint against société sportive par actions (SSPA) due to the use of a “fake” logo for USM Alger. On the same day the new shirt for the 2023–24 season was presented without the new logo, Abdelhak Benchikha's men now wear outfits from the Italian brand Macron.

==== First-team transfers (summer transfer window) ====
Today, I bid farewell to my first home USM Alger, after 5 years I spent in this ancient team, this team that gave me everything, thanks to God, and thanks to our dear team, I joined the U-23 and Algeria A' teams and the Algeria national football team. Love and appreciation especially in the difficult times that I lived through after my injury after the final of the CHAN and in the death of my mother, thanks to the players with whom I spent unforgettable days.

— A message of thanks and farewell from Aymen Mahious on Instagram.

On 20 July 2023, Messala Merbah joined CS Constantine. On 28 July 2023, Houari Baouche joined Merbah at CS Constantine. On August 1, USM Alger announced the recruitment of nine players to strengthen the squad of Abdelhak Benchikha. The players were respectively: the goalkeeper Kamel Soufi, the defenders Juba Chirani, Oussama Barkat and Hocine Dehiri on loan from Paradou AC, the midfielders Kheireddine Toual, Omar Embarek, and the Malian Sékou Konaté and the strikers, Nour El Islam Fettouhi, and Mohamed Amine Bouziane One day later, USM Alger announced the arrival of Nabil Lamara. On 6 August 2023, Abderrahmane Meziane joined CR Belouizdad as free agent. On 9 August 2023, Aymen Mahious joined the newly promoted club in the Swiss Super League Yverdon-Sport for three seasons. He sent a message of farewell to the supporters, thanking them for their support for his five years at the club. On 10 August 2023, USM Alger agreed a contract termination with the Libyan Zakaria Alharaish by mutual consent.

On 16 August 2023, USM Alger announced contracts extension for ten players who were respectively Zineddine Belaïd, Adam Alilet, Saâdi Radouani Oussama Benbot, Islam Merili, Khaled Bousseliou, Oussama Chita, Ismail Belkacemi, Mohamed Ait El Hadj and Brahim Benzaza. All the contacts were extended until 2026 except Chita and Belkacemi who extended their contracts until 2025. On the same day, Haithem Loucif joined his former teammate Mahious at Yverdon-Sport and Imad Benchlef terminated his contract by mutual consent. On 17 August 2023, The Malian striker Abdoulaye Kanou signed for three years. On the same day, Khalil Darfalou signed a contract with US Biskra. On 20 August 2023, the former goalkeeper Abdelmoumen Sifour returned to the club signing a two-year contract. On 23 August 2023, Abderraouf Othmani signed a loan contract with Tunisian club CA Bizertin. On 6 September 2023, Ibrahim Bekakchi joined US Souf.

=== Start of season ===
On October 9, 2023, Abdelhak Benchikha submitted his resignation from his position, according to the official page on Facebook. The reason was that he was subjected to insults at the entrance to the Omar Hamadi Stadium. Later via video, Benchikha denied this and said that he resigned for sporting and professional reasons. Sid Ahmed Arab declared his rejection of his resignation and despite the CEO of Groupe SERPORT moving to his home, Benchikha insisted on his decision. On October 14, USMA achieved their first victory in the Ligue 1 by beating USM Khenchela 3-0 under the leadership of assistant coach Farid Zemiti. On October 17, 2023, Spanish coach Juan Carlos Garrido was appointed new coach for one season. The Usmist management set its sights on Garrido for his experience, particularly in North Africa. On October 19, 2023, The Algerian Football Federation (FAF) announced that it was suspending all football events “until further notice” in solidarity with the Palestinian people. The suspension was announced the day after a strike on a hospital in Gaza, which has been relentlessly shelling the Gaza Strip since the start of the Gaza war sparked on October 7 by the bloody attack. of the Palestinian Islamist movement on its soil. On November 17, The Confederation of African Football has finalized the list of nominees for the 2023 CAF Awards. For the title of best coach, Abdelhak Benchikha winner of the CAF Confederation Cup and the CAF Super Cup is nominated. Defender Zineddine Belaïd and striker Aymen Mahious will compete for the title of best African player in club competitions (CAF CL and CAF CC). USM Alger holder of the CAF Confederation Cup and the CAF Super Cup, is nominated for the title of best club in Africa, along with Al Ahly, Wydad AC, Mamelodi Sundowns and Young Africans.

On November 21, Mohamed-Karim Eddine Harkati, CEO of the Groupe SERPORT, summoned the main leaders of USM Alger to discuss the complicated situation in which the team finds itself and seek solutions to put in place. The Rouge et Noir have just suffered two consecutive defeats in Ligue 1. Poor performances which contrast greatly with the club's recent successes on the continental scene. Harkati requested a rapid recovery and reiterated his confidence in the management staff. On November 30, The CAF announced the official launch of the Association of African Clubs, USM Alger will be one of the member clubs of this association along with three other Algerian clubs, The ACA's objectives include protecting and promoting the interests of African football clubs; ensuring their commercial viability and global competitiveness; developing youth talent and academies; and building partnerships with sponsors, the private sector, and governments to improve football infrastructure and facilities across the continent. After the exclusion of USM Alger from the Best Club CAF Awards, Benchikha the candidate for the Best Coach Award decided not to participate in the ceremony that will be held in Marrakesh, in solidarity with his former team, with whom he won two continental titles, also FAF President Walid Sadi called for a boycott of the ceremony following the scandal of Riyad Mahrez’s absence from the list of the top three players.

=== Season run-in ===
On December 29, 2023, Djamel Belmadi announced the list of 26 for the CAN, including two players from USM Alger Oussama Benbot and Zineddine Belaïd. This is the first time since the 2017 Africa Cup of Nations that players from the team have been called up. On January 2, 2024, After consultation between its various members, USM Alger announced that it had terminated the functions of the club's sports manager Taoufik Korichi with immediate effect without specifying the reasons for this decision. However two days later the majority shareholder of SSPA/USMA Groupe SERPORT has made changes at the head of the club’s management, and during the meeting of the board of directors held it was decided to appoint Hacen Hassina new president of the board in place of Sid Ahmed Arab. Furthermore Abdelmadjid Rezkane is the new CEO of SSPA/USMA, while Farid Sefar advisor to the former President of the CA was dismissed from his position. Immediately after that Korichi returned to his position as sports director by decision of Harkati.

On January 23, 2024 facing the newly promoted ES Ben Aknoun as part of the calendar update, USM Alger scored a fifth victory in a row winning by a score of two goals to one. A victory which allowed him to climb onto the podium for the first time this season in Ligue 1. Upon returning from the locker room the guys from Soustara will quickly get to the heart of the matter. On a well-taken free kick executed by Benzaza, Bacha with a nice header broke the deadlock in the 47th minute. USM Alger has just scored a fifth consecutive victory once again thanks to Belkacemi, author of his fourth goal of the season in the 89th minute.

==== First-team transfers (winter transfer window) ====
On 9 January 2024, Tumisang Orebonye signed a cantract termination with the club after disagreement with the head coach Juan Carlos Garrido as reported by many sources. The Botswanian joined Moroccan club AS FAR. On 24 January 2024, USM Alger agreed contract termination with Abdesslem Bouchouareb by mutual consent. On January 25, Adel Belkacem Bouzida signed one-year loan contract from Paradou AC. On January 29, Oussama Bellatreche signed a two-and-a-half-year contract coming from JS Saoura, after agreement between the two clubs. On the same day, Nour El Islam Fettouhi joined JS Saoura and Taher Benkhelifa signed contract termination with the club. On 30 January 2024, the Russian club CSKA Moscow signed a contract with the under-21 team's player Sid Ahmed Aissaoui. The two clubs agreed a transfer fee of $150,000, USM Alger also negotiated a percentage on resale. On 31 January 2024, after terminating his contract with JS Kabylie, Salim Boukhanchouche has signed up for a period of two years. On the same day The Cameroonian club Dynamo Douala announced the transfer of international striker Leonel Ateba to USM Alger for a period of two and a half years. The signing of the player cost 250,000 euros. On 5 February 2024, Kheireddine Toual was loaned to ES Ben Aknoun until the end of the season.

=== RS Berkane matches crisis ===
During the campaign to defend the CAF Confederation Cup title, USM Alger faced Moroccan club RS Berkane in the semi-final. Three days before the match, RS Berkane club traveled to Algeria. Due to ambiguity regarding the match shirts which show the map of Morocco including Western Sahara. Algeria also broke off diplomatic relations with its Moroccan neighbor because of this issue. Algerian customs asked to see these jerseys and did not allow the delegation to take them. On the day of the match RS Berkane refused to play the match without his jersey. On April 24, 2024, it was announced that the organizing committee of the competition had sanctioned USM Alger by forfeiting it with a 3–0 defeat for the first leg.

Despite the lingering crisis due to the first leg, USM Alger traveled to Morocco on April 26. During the technical meeting before the match RS Berkane indicated that she planned to wear the set of jerseys flocked with the map of Morocco with Western Sahara. USM Alger refused to play the match and the officials waited a quarter of an hour before realizing that one of the two teams had not left the locker room. On May 2, Confederation of African Football designated RS Berkane as finalist of the CAF Confederation Cup and declared to transmit the file to the disciplinary committee for possible other sanctions against the Algerian Football Federation.

On May 2, the Court of Arbitration for Sport announced that it had rejected the request for interim relief to suspend the decision of the CAF appeal jury which validated the use of the RS Berkane jersey, in the absence of a response from the Confederation of African Football. However, the case remains open on the merits and the court is in the process of collecting the elements of each party. On May 10, the Lausanne court once again rejected a request from USM Alger to suspend the Confederation Cup final, pending the conclusion of arbitration proceedings with CAF in the RS Berkane affair.

== Squad list ==
Players and squad numbers last updated on 14 June 2024.
Note: Flags indicate national team as has been defined under FIFA eligibility rules. Players may hold more than one non-FIFA nationality.

No.	Nat.	Name	Position	Date of birth (age)	Signed in	Contract ends	Signed from	Apps	Goals	Transfer fees
Goalkeepers
1	(Algeria)	Abdelmoumen Sifour	GK	3 March 1998 (aged 25)	2023	2025	(Algeria) RC Arbaâ	10	0	Free transfer
16	(Algeria)	Kamel Soufi	GK	5 June 1996 (aged 27)	2023	2025	(Algeria) MC Oran	17	0	Free transfer
25	(Algeria)	Oussama Benbot	GK	11 October 1994 (aged 28)	2021	2026	(Algeria) JS Kabylie	86	0	Free transfer
Defenders
3	(Algeria)	Juba Chirani	LB	4 January 1998 (aged 25)	2023	2025	(Algeria) Olympique Akbou	5	0	Free transfer
4	(Algeria)	Zineddine Belaïd (C.)	CB	20 March 1999 (aged 24)	2020	2026	(Algeria) NA Hussein Dey	137	15	20,000,000 DA
5	(Algeria)	Mustapha Bouchina	CB	10 August 1991 (aged 32)	2020	2024	(Algeria) Paradou AC	101	2	11,000,000 DA
12	(Algeria)	Oussama Barkat	RB	29 January 2001 (aged 22)	2023	2026	(Algeria) MO Constantine	10	0	Free transfer
15	(Algeria)	Nabil Lamara	LB	15 August 1993 (aged 30)	2023	2025	(Tunisia) Club Africain	30	0	Free transfer
19	(Algeria)	Saâdi Radouani (Note: Radouani played previously for USM Alger from 2015 to 2016.) (V.C.)	RB	18 March 1995 (aged 28)	2020	2026	(Algeria) ES Sétif	126	7	Free transfer
20	(Algeria)	Hocine Dehiri	CB	16 September 2000 (aged 23)	2023	2024	(Algeria) Paradou AC	39	1	Loan
21	(Algeria)	Adam Alilet	CB	17 January 1999 (aged 24)	2019	2026	(Algeria) Reserve team	95	6	Academy Player
81	(Algeria)	Abdessamed Bounacer	CB	11 December 2004 (aged 18)	2022	2025	(Algeria) Reserve team	35	1	Academy Player
Midfielders
6	(Algeria)	Oussama Chita	DM	31 October 1996 (aged 26)	2017	2025	(Algeria) MC Alger	169	4	Free transfer
8	(Algeria)	Islam Merili	AM	27 June 1998 (aged 25)	2022	2026	(Algeria) ASO Chlef	71	7	Free transfer
10	(Mali)	Sékou Konaté	AM	17 January 1998 (aged 25)	2023	2026	(Mali) Stade Malien	16	1	Free transfer
13	(Algeria)	Omar Embarek	DM	11 November 1998 (aged 24)	2023	2026	(Algeria) MC El Bayadh	25	0	Free transfer
14	(Algeria)	Brahim Benzaza	DM	8 April 1997 (aged 26)	2021	2026	(Algeria) ASO Chlef	81	6	Free transfer
18	(Algeria)	Salim Boukhanchouche	DM	6 October 1991 (aged 32)	2024	2026	(Algeria) JS Kabylie	18	1	Free transfer
26	(Algeria)	Akram Djahnit	AM	3 April 1991 (aged 32)	2022	2024	(Algeria) ES Sétif	66	5	Free transfer
38	(Algeria)	Abdelkrim Namani	AM	13 May 2003 (aged 20)	2022	2024	(Algeria) Reserve team	25	1	Academy Player
72	(Algeria)	Mohamed Ait El Hadj	AM	22 March 2002 (aged 21)	2020	2026	(Algeria) Reserve team	56	4	Academy Player
Forwards
2	(Algeria)	Abderrahmane Bacha	ST	21 December 1999 (aged 22)	2022	2024	(Algeria) JS Bordj Ménaïel	46	7	Free transfer
7	(Algeria)	Ismail Belkacemi	LW	24 June 1993 (aged 30)	2020	2025	(Algeria) CS Constantine	136	45	Free transfer
9	(Mali)	Abdoulaye Kanou	ST	7 October 2000 (aged 22)	2023	2026	(Mali) Djoliba AC	40	13	Undisclosed
11	(Algeria)	Mohamed Amine Bouziane	LW	5 February 1996 (aged 27)	2023	2025	(Tunisia) US Monastir	16	2	Free transfer
17	(Algeria)	Oussama Bellatreche	RW	3 July 1995 (aged 28)	2024	2026	(Algeria) JS Saoura	10	3	30,000,000 DA
23	(Algeria)	Khaled Bousseliou	LW	3 October 1997 (aged 25)	2022	2026	(Algeria) CR Belouizdad	41	5	Free transfer
24	(Cameroon)	Leonel Ateba	ST	6 February 1999 (aged 24)	2024	2026	(Cameroon) Dynamo Douala	20	3	250,000 €
27	(Algeria)	Adel Belkacem Bouzida	RW	28 February 2002 (aged 21)	2024	2025	(Algeria) Paradou AC	4	0	Loan

== Transfers ==
=== In ===
==== Summer ====
Date	Pos	Player	Moving from	Fee	Source
16 July 2023	FW	(Algeria) Abderrahmane Bacha	USM Khenchela	Loan return	
1 August 2023	GK	(Algeria) Kamel Soufi	MC Oran	Free transfer	
1 August 2023	FW	(Algeria) Nour El Islam Fettouhi	ASO Chlef	Free transfer	
1 August 2023	LB	(Algeria) Juba Chirani	Olympique Akbou	Free transfer	
1 August 2023	RB	(Algeria) Oussama Barkat	MO Constantine	Free transfer	
1 August 2023	CB	(Algeria) Hocine Dehiri	Paradou AC	Loan for one year	
1 August 2023	MF	(Algeria) Kheireddine Toual	RC Arbaâ	Free transfer	
1 August 2023	MF	(Algeria) Omar Embarek	MC El Bayadh	Undisclosed	
1 August 2023	AM	(Mali) Sékou Konaté	(Mali) Stade Malien	Free transfer	
1 August 2023	LW	(Algeria) Mohamed Amine Bouziane	(Tunisia) US Monastir	Free transfer	
2 August 2023	LB	(Algeria) Nabil Lamara	(Tunisia) Club Africain	Free transfer	
17 August 2023	FW	(Mali) Abdoulaye Kanou	(Mali) Djoliba AC	Free transfer	
20 August 2023	GK	(Algeria) Abdelmoumen Sifour	RC Arbaâ	Free transfer	

==== Winter ====
Date	Pos	Player	Moving from	Fee	Source
25 January 2024	FW	(Algeria) Adel Belkacem Bouzida	Paradou AC	Loan	
29 January 2024	FW	(Algeria) Oussama Bellatreche	JS Saoura	Undisclosed	
31 January 2024	MF	(Algeria) Salim Boukhanchouche	JS Kabylie	Free transfer	
31 January 2024	FW	(Cameroon) Leonel Ateba	(Cameroon) Dynamo Douala	250,000 €	

=== Out ===
==== Summer ====
Date	Pos	Player	Moving to	Fee	Source
1 July 2023	GK	(Algeria) Lamine Zemmamouche	Retired	—N/a	
16 July 2023	FW	(Algeria) Abdelkrim Zouari	Unattached	Free transfer	
20 July 2023	MF	(Algeria) Messala Merbah	CS Constantine	Free transfer	
28 July 2023	DF	(Algeria) Houari Baouche	CS Constantine	Free transfer	
6 August 2023	FW	(Algeria) Abderrahmane Meziane	CR Belouizdad	Free transfer	
9 August 2023	FW	(Algeria) Aymen Mahious	(Switzerland) Yverdon-Sport	Free transfer	
10 August 2023	FW	(Libya) Zakaria Alharaish	Unattached	Free transfer (Released)	
16 August 2023	DF	(Algeria) Haithem Loucif	(Switzerland) Yverdon-Sport	Free transfer	
16 August 2023	GK	(Algeria) Imad Benchlef	Unattached	Free transfer (Released)	
17 August 2023	FW	(Algeria) Khalil Darfalou	US Biskra	Free transfer	
23 August 2023	FW	(Algeria) Abderraouf Othmani	(Tunisia) CA Bizertin	Loan	
6 September 2023	DF	(Algeria) Ibrahim Bekakchi	US Souf	Free transfer	
10 September 2023	DF	(Algeria) Abdelkader Belharrane	MC Oran	Free transfer	

==== Winter ====
Date	Pos	Player	Moving to	Fee	Source
9 January 2024	FW	(Botswana) Tumisang Orebonye	(Morocco) AS FAR	200,000 €	
24 January 2024	FW	(Algeria) Abdesslem Bouchouareb	Unattached	Free transfer (Released)	
29 January 2024	FW	(Algeria) Nour El Islam Fettouhi	JS Saoura	Free transfer	
29 January 2024	MF	(Algeria) Taher Benkhelifa	Unattached	Free transfer (Released)	
5 February 2024	MF	(Algeria) Kheireddine Toual	ES Ben Aknoun	Loan	
20 February 2024	MF	(Algeria) Sid Ahmed Aissaoui	(Russia) CSKA Moscow	250,000 $	

=== New contracts ===
No.	Pos	Player	Contract length	Contract end	Date	Source
4	CB	Zineddine Belaïd	2 years	2026	16 August 2023	
6	DM	Oussama Chita	2 years	2025	16 August 2023	
7	LW	Ismail Belkacemi	2 years	2025	16 August 2023	
8	AM	Islam Merili	2 years	2026	16 August 2023	
14	DM	Brahim Benzaza	3 years	2026	16 August 2023	
19	RB	Saâdi Radouani	2 years	2026	16 August 2023	
21	CB	Adam Alilet	2 years	2026	16 August 2023	
23	LW	Khaled Bousseliou	2 years	2026	16 August 2023	
25	GK	Oussama Benbot	2 years	2026	16 August 2023	
72	MF	Mohamed Ait El Hadj	2 years	2026	16 August 2023	

== Pre-season and friendlies ==
21 August 2023 Friendly	CA Bizertin (Tunisia)	0–5	(Algeria) USM Alger	Tabarka, Tunisia
16:00 UTC+1			Fettouhi 10', 37'; Benzaza 17'; Ait El Hadj 56'; Merili 90+3' First half - Benbot, Radouani, Lamara, Alilet, Belaïd, Benzaza, Embarek, Konaté, Fettouhi, Belkacemi, Orebonye. Second half - Soufi, Chirani, Barkat, Dehiri, Bouchina, Benkhelifa, Merili, Toual, Ait El Hadj, Bouziane, Bouali.

28 August 2023 Friendly	ES Métlaoui (Tunisia)	0–3	(Algeria) USM Alger	Tabarka, Tunisia
17:00 UTC+1			Belaïd 67'; Belkacemi 82' (pen.); Benzaza 90' Benbot, Radouani (Embarek, 87'), Lamara (Chirani, 68'), Alilet (Dehiri, 68'), Belaïd (Bounacer, 77'), Chita (Benzaza, 46'), Embarek (Benkhelifa, 46'), Konaté (Belkacemi, 46'), Fettouhi (?, 68'), Kanou (Merili, 46'), Orebonye (Bousseliou, 68').

1 September 2023 Friendly	AS Marsa (Tunisia)	1–5	(Algeria) USM Alger	Tabarka, Tunisia
17:00 UTC+1			Belkacemi 12', 24', 38', 45'; Ait El Hadj 14' First half - Soufi, Chirani, Radouani, Dehiri, Alilet, Chita, Merili, Toual, Ait El Hadj, Bouziane, Belkacemi. Second half - Sifour, Lamara, Barkat, Belaïd, Bounacer, Benkhelifa, Embarek, Konaté, Bouali, Bousseliou, Kanou.

6 September 2023 Friendly	USM Alger	2–1	JS Saoura	Baraki
17:00 UTC+1	Bousseliou 12'; Kanou 74' Soufi, Lamara (Chirani, 72'), Radouani, Belaïd, Alilet (Dehiri, 55'), Chita, Benzaza, Konaté (Benkhelifa, 72'), Bousseliou (Ait El Hadj, 46'), Fettouhi, Belkacemi (Kanou, 46').		Saâd 68'

9 September 2023 Friendly	USM Alger	2–0	RC Kouba	Bologhine
17:00 UTC+1	Fettouhi 39'; Ait El Hadj 79'			Stadium: Omar Hamadi Stadium

== Competitions ==
=== Overview ===
Competition	Record								Started round	Final position / round	First match	Last match
Competition	G	W	D	L	GF	GA	GD	Win %	Started round	Final position / round	First match	Last match
Ligue 1	30	15	4	11	40	32	+8	50.00	—N/a	4th	27 September 2023	14 June 2024
Algerian Cup	5	4	1	0	23	3	+20	80.00	Round of 64	Semi-finals	4 February 2024	24 April 2024
Confederation Cup	10	5	3	2	11	5	+6	50.00	Second round	Semi-finals	23 September 2023	28 April 2024
CAF Super Cup	1	1	0	0	1	0	+1	100.00	Final	Winners	15 September 2023	
Total	46	25	8	13	75	40	+35	54.35				

Updated to match played 14 June 2024
Source: Competitions

=== Ligue 1 ===
==== League table ====
Pos	Team	Pld	W	D	L	GF	GA	GD	Pts	Qualification or relegation
2	CR Belouizdad	30	15	8	7	37	20	+17	53	Qualification for CAF Champions League
3	CS Constantine	30	15	8	7	46	30	+16	53	Qualification for CAF Confederation Cup
4	USM Alger	30	15	4	11	40	32	+8	49	Qualification for CAF Confederation Cup
5	ES Sétif	30	14	6	10	37	37	0	48	
6	Paradou AC	30	11	9	10	36	22	+14	42	

Source: the-sports.org
Rules for classification: 1) points; 2) head-to-head points; 3) head-to-head goal difference; 4) goal difference; 5) total goals; 6) fairplay ranking; 7) playoff.

==== Results summary ====
Overall								Home						Away					
Pld	W	D	L	GF	GA	GD	Pts	W	D	L	GF	GA	GD	W	D	L	GF	GA	GD
30	15	4	11	40	32	+8	49	10	2	3	26	16	+10	5	2	8	14	16	−2

Last updated: 14 June 2024.
Source: Competitive matches

==== Results by round ====
Round	1	2	3	4	5	6	7	8	9	10	11	12	13	14	15	16	17	18	19	20	21	22	23	24	25	26	27	28	29	30
Ground	A	H	A	A	H	A	H	A	H	A	H	A	H	A	H	H	A	H	H	A	H	A	H	A	H	A	H	A	H	A
Result	L	W	L	L	W	L	W	W	L	D	D	W	W	W	W	L	L	W	D	W	W	L	L	D	W	L	W	L	W	W
Position	13	7	9	13	12	13	11	7	10	11	13	9	7	5	4	6	6	5	5	4	4	4	6	5	5	5	4	4	4	4

Updated to match(es) played on 14 June 2024. Source: Competitive matches
A = Away; H = Home; W = Win; D = Draw; L = Loss

==== Matches ====
The league fixtures were announced on 24 August 2023.

All times are local, WAT (UTC+1).

Win Draw Loss Postponed

27 September 2023 Round 1	Paradou AC	1–0	USM Alger	Dar El Beïda
16:00	Ait Abdesslem (yellow card) 43'; Kohili 90+3' (yellow card) 90+3'	Report	Alilet (yellow card) 23'; Benzaza (yellow card) 90+6'	Stadium: Omar Benrabah Stadium; Referee: Mohamed Bouteraa; Assistant referees: Mehdi Walid Benali, Youcef Sohbi; Fourth official: Amine Hamadeche

7 October 2023 Round 4	JS Kabylie	1–0	USM Alger	Tizi Ouzou
19:00	Gatal (yellow card) 4'; Boukhanchouche (yellow card) 87'; Berkane 64' (yellow card) 90+3'	Report	Merili (yellow card) 15'; Toual (yellow card) 45+3'	Stadium: 1 November 1954 Stadium; Referee: Houssam Benyahia; Assistant referees: Samir Bioud, Mohamed Hmaïdi; Fourth official: Massinissa Serdjane

14 October 2023 Round 2	USM Alger	3–0	USM Khenchela	Dar El Beïda
15:30	Embarek (yellow card) 56'; Benzaza 67'; Bouziane 69'; Chita (yellow card) 77'; Belkacemi (yellow card) 81'; Ait El Hadj 90+3'	Report	Yaiche (yellow card) 23'; Semahi (yellow card) 40'	Stadium: Omar Benrabah Stadium; Referee: Youcef Tayeb Bouderbal; Assistant referees: Yacine Ouerd Benslama, Mustapha Kessar; Fourth official: Malek Aït Ameur

10 November 2023 Round 5	USM Alger	2–1	CR Belouizdad	Algiers
17:00	Alilet (yellow card) 8'; Orebonye (yellow card) 17'; Kanou 64'; Embarek (yellow card) 80'; Benzaza 90+3'	Report	Wamba 62'; Belkhiter (yellow card) 69'	Stadium: Stade du 5 Juillet; Attendance: 0 (close doors); Referee: Mustapha Ghorbal; Assistant referees: Akram Zerhouni, Mokrane Gourari; Fourth official: Lyés Bekouassa

14 November 2023 Round 3	ES Sétif	2–1	USM Alger	Sétif
19:00	Lahmeri 16' (pen.); Askar (yellow card) 27'; Aggoun 49'; Saidi (yellow card) 88'	Report	Belaïd (yellow card) 14'; Yahia 28' (o.g.); Kanou (yellow card) 37'; Fettouhi (yellow card) 90+1'	Stadium: 8 May 1945 Stadium; Attendance: 0 (close doors); Referee: Akram Mechairia; Assistant referees: Mohamed Benamira, Antar Boulfelfel; Fourth official: Ahmed Daas

18 November 2023 Round 6	US Biskra	1–0	USM Alger	Biskra
18:00	Zeghnoun 14'; Belkacemi (yellow card) 16'; Lakhdari (yellow card) 40'; Dakhia (yellow card) 56'	Report	Barkat (yellow card) 28'; Fettouhi (yellow card) 86'	Stadium: 18 February Stadium; Referee: Billel Bendjahene; Assistant referees: Zakaria Miraoui, Youcef Sohbi; Fourth official: Oussama Kebab

15 December 2023 Round 10	MC El Bayadh	1–1	USM Alger	El Bayadh
15:15	Barka (yellow card) 9' (goal) 56'; Berriah (yellow card) 41'; Benzid (yellow card) 49'; Belaribi (yellow card) 57'; Mellal (yellow card) 88'	Report	Kanou (yellow card) 29'; Belkacemi 76'; Benbot (yellow card) 90+2'	Stadium: Zakaria Medjdoub Stadium; Referee: Lahlou Benbraham; Assistant referees: Hamza Bouzit, Amirouche Boufassa; Fourth official: Oussama Serir

29 December 2023 Round 11	USM Alger	0–0	MC Alger	Algiers
18:00	Benzaza (yellow card) 32'; Embarek (yellow card) 56'; Benbot (yellow card) 88'; Dehiri (yellow card) 90+1'	Report	Belaïli (yellow card) 9'; Zougrana (yellow card) 21'	Stadium: Stade du 5 Juillet; Referee: Mustapha Ghorbal; Assistant referees: Akram Zerhouni, Mokrane Gourari; Fourth official: Mohamed Lamine Chaoubi
Note: The match was originally to be played on 25 December 2023, but it was postponed due to the fatal traffic accident by MC El Bayadh.

5 January 2024 Round 12	ASO Chlef	0–1	USM Alger	Chlef
15:45	Abada (yellow card) 43'	Report	Merili 37'; Kanou (yellow card) 43'	Stadium: Mohamed Boumezrag Stadium; Referee: Nabil Boukhalfa; Assistant referees: Yacine Ouerd Benslama, Asma Feriel Ouahab; Fourth official: Tayeb Benyabka

11 January 2024 Round 13	USM Alger	2–1	JS Saoura	Algiers
19:00	Radouani (yellow card) 52'; Lamara (yellow card) 72'; Alilet (yellow card) 74'; Belkacemi 89', 90+5'; Bacha (yellow card) 90+1'	Report	Bellatreche 28'; Ouis (yellow card) 45+4'; Khelif (yellow card) 64'; Ouabdi (yellow card) 85' (yellow-red card) 89'	Stadium: Stade du 5 Juillet; Referee: Billel Soltani; Assistant referees: Soufiane Cherif Zaatri, Youcef Mchid Hedjala; Fourth official: Fodil Oukil

15 January 2024 Round 7	USM Alger	2–0	MC Oran	Algiers
18:00	Benzaza 62'; Dehiri 78'	Report	Toual (yellow card) 53'; Senhadji (yellow card) 57'	Stadium: Stade du 5 Juillet; Referee: Abdelmoumen Touabti; Assistant referees: Hamza Bouzit, Badreddine Bellaghma; Fourth official: Massinissa Serdjane

19 January 2024 Round 14	US Souf	1–3	USM Alger	El Oued
15:30	Hadj Saad 14'; Belamine (yellow card) 56'; Siab (yellow card) 79'	Report	Bouziane 26'; Radouani (yellow card) 29'; Bouchina (yellow card) 56'; Kanou 76', 90+4'; Bounacer (yellow card) 87'; Belkacemi (yellow card) 89'	Stadium: 1 November 1954 Stadium; Attendance: 0 (close doors); Referee: Ayoub Belhachemi; Assistant referees: Abdelkader Siafa, Mohamed Ilyas Zoubiri; Fourth official: Hamoudi Nebili

23 January 2024 Round 8	ES Ben Aknoun	1–2	USM Alger	Belouizdad
15:30	Belouchat (yellow card) 42'; Deghmani 83'; Haddouche (yellow card) 90+2'	Report	Bacha 48'; Embarek (yellow card) 61'; Benzaza (yellow card) 71'; Belkacemi 89'; Kanou (yellow card) 90'; Bounacer (yellow card) 90+5'	Stadium: 20 August 1955 Stadium; Referee: Hamza Bouslimani; Assistant referees: Habib Belbachir, Kadhafi Badache; Fourth official: Lamia Athmane

28 January 2024 Round 15	USM Alger	3–1	NC Magra	Algiers
18:00	Djahnit 33' (yellow card) 35'; Radouani 62' (pen.); Merili 68'	Report	Aib (yellow card) 31'; Benkouider (yellow card) 45+1' (yellow-red card) 90+3'; Merouani (yellow card) 60'; Bourahla 67'	Stadium: Stade du 5 Juillet; Referee: Mehadji Tayeb Bouderbal; Assistant referees: Yassine Tadji, Idriss Kedroussi; Fourth official: Lamia Athmane

31 January 2024 Round 9	USM Alger	1–2	CS Constantine	Algiers
19:00	Dehiri (yellow card) 74'; Bousseliou 87'	Report	Merbah (yellow card) 34'; Belhocini 60'; Bouhalfaya (yellow card) 68'; Dib 80' (pen.)	Stadium: Stade du 5 Juillet; Referee: Youcef Taieb Bouderbal; Assistant referees: Mohamed Serradj, Mustapha Kessar; Fourth official: Mohamed Lamine Chaoubi

11 February 2024 Round 16	USM Alger	1–5	Paradou AC	Algiers
18:00	Belaïd (yellow card) 51'; Merili (yellow card) 67'; Bacha 81'	Report	Titraoui 16'; Douar (yellow card) 45'; Kaassis 45+2'; Bendouma (yellow card) 70'; Toulouenga 72'; Boulbina 82'; Ait Abdessalem (yellow card) 89'; Kohili 90+3' (yellow card) 90+4'	Stadium: Stade du 5 Juillet; Referee: Anes Azrine; Assistant referees: Abdelkader Slimani, Mahmoud Hadji; Fourth official: Ayoub Belhachemi

16 February 2024 Round 17	USM Khenchela	1–0	USM Alger	Khenchela
15:30	Sameur 19' (pen.); Samadiaré (yellow card) 36'; Hoggas (yellow card) 64'; Guemroud (yellow card) 78'; Khedairia (yellow card) 90+3'	Report	Bellatreche (yellow card) 19'; Bounacer (yellow card) 81' (yellow-red card) 86'	Stadium: Amar Hamam Stadium; Referee: Abderahmane Sahraoui; Assistant referees: Islem Boukhatem, Imadeddine Benbouriche; Fourth official: Abdelmoumen Ragdi

15 March 2024 Round 20	CR Belouizdad	0–1	USM Alger	Algiers
22:00	Bouchar (yellow card) 45+3'; Azzi (yellow card) 90+6'	Report	Bacha 18'; Boukhanchouche (yellow card) 31' (yellow-red card) 90+8'; Kanou (yellow card) 45+4'	Stadium: Stade du 5 Juillet; Referee: Youcef Gamouh; Assistant referees: Antar Boulfelfel, Haytem Bouima; Fourth official: Hamza Bouslimani

19 March 2024 Round 18	USM Alger	2–0	ES Sétif	Algiers
22:00	Bacha 34'; Kanou 59'; Bounacer (yellow card) 64'; Bousseliou (yellow card) 90'	Report		Stadium: Stade du 5 Juillet; Referee: Nabil Boukhalfa; Assistant referees: Amine Belaroussi, Akram Sohbi; Fourth official: Mohamed Belkebir

24 March 2024 Round 21	USM Alger	1–0	US Biskra	Algiers
22:00	Radouani (yellow card) 22'; Boukhanchouche (yellow card) 30'; Belkacemi 84'	Report	Belkacemi (yellow card) 10'; Khoualed (yellow card) 68'; Darfalou (yellow card) 75'	Stadium: Stade du 5 Juillet; Referee: Mustapha Ghorbal; Assistant referees: Akram Zerhouni, Asma Feriel Ouahab; Fourth official: Malek Aït Ameur

6 May 2024 Round 19	USM Alger	2–2	JS Kabylie	Baraki
19:00	Belkacemi 18', 42'; Benzaza (yellow card) 40'	Report	Souyad (yellow card) 9' (yellow-red card) 68'; Boualia 20'; Redjem (yellow card) 28'; Maâmeri 73' (pen.)	Stadium: Nelson Mandela Stadium; Referee: Mustapha Ghorbal; Assistant referees: Akram Zerhouni, Asma Feriel Ouahab; Fourth official: Radouane Alou

10 May 2024 Round 25	USM Alger	2–1	MC El Bayadh	Algiers
17:00	Belkacemi 19' (pen.), 45+3' (yellow card) 79'; Benbot (yellow card) 24'; Dehiri (yellow card) 27'; Djahnit (yellow card) 37'; Bouchina (yellow card) 39'	Report	Amaouche (yellow card) 18'; Belmiloud 28' (pen.)	Stadium: Stade du 5 Juillet; Referee: Ayoub Belhachemi; Assistant referees: Abdelkader Siafa, Mohamed Zoubiri; Fourth official: Delloul Benhadj

17 May 2024 Round 26	MC Alger	1–0	USM Alger	Algiers
18:00	Zougrana 23'; Benkhemassa (yellow card) 25'; Abdellaoui (yellow card) 36'	Report	Bounacer (yellow card) 79'	Stadium: Stade du 5 Juillet; Referee: Nabil Boukhalfa; Assistant referees: Yacine Ouard Benslama, Amine Belaroussi; Fourth official: Tahar Boudjemaa

21 May 2024 Round 22	MC Oran	1–0	USM Alger	Oran
19:00	Dahar 39'; Nehari (yellow card) 87'	Report		Stadium: Ahmed Zabana Stadium; Referee: Said Aouina; Assistant referees: Faouzi Aouina, Youcef Arioua; Fourth official: Yahia Dahar

25 May 2024 Round 27	USM Alger	2–1	ASO Chlef	Belouizdad
17:00	Belkacemi 64'; Belaïd (yellow card) 65'; Kanou 74'; Bounacer (yellow card) 90+2'; Namani (yellow card) 90+3'	Report	Bourdim 36' (yellow card) 54'; Achour (yellow card) 61'; Aliane (yellow card) 62'; Mohutsiwa (yellow card) 68'; Abada (yellow card) 79'	Stadium: 20 August 1955 Stadium; Referee: Youcef Taieb Bouderbal; Assistant referees: Akram Sohbi, Mustapha Kessar; Fourth official: Massinissa Serdjane

30 May 2024 Round 23	USM Alger	0–2	ES Ben Aknoun	Belouizdad
17:00	Bacha (yellow card) 62'; Alilet (yellow card) 83'; Bounacer (yellow card) 83'	Report	Hadji 33'; Boutiche (yellow card) 55'; Haroun 86'; Guennoune (yellow card) 90+2'	Stadium: 20 August 1955 Stadium; Referee: Abdelali Ibrir; Assistant referees: Amine Chellali, Abdelkader Manacer; Fourth official: Redouane Allou

3 June 2024 Round 24	CS Constantine	1–1	USM Alger	Constantine
18:00	Dib (yellow card) 52'; Rebiaï 56' (yellow card) 90+4'	Report	Kanou (yellow card) 12'; Boukhanchouche (yellow card) 90'; Konaté (yellow card) 87' (goal) 90+2'; Embarek (yellow card) 90+4'; Soufi (yellow card) 90+6'	Stadium: Chahid Hamlaoui Stadium; Referee: Tahar Boudjemaa; Assistant referees: Abderezak Zemit, Youcef Arioua; Fourth official: Zouhir Maansri

7 June 2024 Round 28	JS Saoura	2–1	USM Alger	Béchar
16:45	Bouchiba 39'; Souibaâh (yellow card) 11' (goal) 89'; Khelif (yellow card) 43'; Ouabdi (yellow card) 43'	Report	Benamar 12' (o.g.); Embarek (yellow card) 40'; Barkat (yellow card) 87'; Soufi (yellow card) 90'; Dehiri (yellow card) 90'; Bounacer (yellow card) 90'	Stadium: 20 August 1955 Stadium; Attendance: 0 (close doors); Referee: Mohamed Saidi; Assistant referees: Zakaria Miraoui, Mehdi Benali; Fourth official: Benamar Sellakh

11 June 2024 Round 29	USM Alger	3–0	US Souf	Blida
16:45	Belkacemi 1', 12', 89'	Report		Stadium: Mustapha Tchaker Stadium; Attendance: 0 (close doors); Referee: Zouhir Maansri; Assistant referees: Chihabeddine Khodrane, Chihabeddine Labidi; Fourth official: Mohamed Reda Remada

14 June 2024 Round 30	NC Magra	2–3	USM Alger	Magra
16:45	Berkane 45+5'; Chemouri (yellow card) 68'; Demane 76'	Report	Bounacer (yellow card) 23' (yellow-red card) 23'; Belkacemi 71' (pen.); Boukhanchouche (yellow card) 23' (goal) 81'; Radouani (yellow card) 83'; Ateba 86'; Sifour (yellow card) 88'	Stadium: Boucheligue Brothers Stadium; Referee: Mohamed Amine Benzohra; Assistant referees: Nadir Otsmane, Hatem Rih; Fourth official: Abderrahmane Sahraoui

=== Algerian Cup ===
4 February 2024 Round of 64	US Boukhadra	2–5	USM Alger	Annaba
13:45	Kaidi 75'; Khazri 88' (pen.)	Report	Kanou 40', 43'; Bounacer 50'; Bouchina 60'; Barkat 68'	Stadium: Abdelkader Chabou Stadium; Referee: Haithem Ghouti; Assistant referees: Rachid Tamrabet, Sami Djaouad; Fourth official: Fettouh Koriche
Note: USM Alger Lineups: Benbot, Alilet, Bounacer, Barkat, Lamara (substituted off) 33' (Dehiri, (substituted on) 33'), Bouchina (substituted off) 73' (Konaté, (substituted on) 73'), Naamani, Djahnit, Bousseliou (substituted off) 66' (Mbarek, (substituted on) 66'), Bacha (substituted off) 46' (Bellatreche, (substituted on) 46'), Kanou (substituted off) 66' (Bouzida, (substituted on) 66')

8 March 2024 Round of 32	USM Alger	8–0	MB Rouissat	Algiers
18:00	Bellatreche 5', 50'; Djahnit 24', 41', 74'; Belaïd 53' (pen.); Ateba 64', 87'	Report		Stadium: Stade du 5 Juillet; Referee: Ahmed Benhamou; Assistant referees: Mourad Benhamou, Oussama Arafa; Fourth official: Amine Hamadache
Note: USM Alger Lineups: Benbot, Belaïd, Alilet, Radouani, Lamara (substituted off) 56' (Barkat, (substituted on) 56'), Chita (substituted off) 46' (Naamani, (substituted on) 46'), Djahnit, Boukhanchouche (substituted off) 56' (Bouchina, (substituted on) 56'), Bousseliou, Bellatreche (substituted off) 63' (Ateba, (substituted on) 63'), Kanou (substituted off) 69' (Bacha, (substituted on) 69')

12 April 2024 Round of 16	USM Alger	7–0	RC Bougaa	Algiers
17:30	Belaïd 39'; Bellatreche 50'; Djahnit 55'; Belkacemi 68', 76'; Kanou 73', 81'	Report		Stadium: Stade du 5 Juillet; Referee: Fodil Oukil; Assistant referees: Moussa Saidani, Ali Mustapha; Fourth official: Anis Moudjeb
Note: USM Alger Lineups: Soufi, Belaïd, Dehiri, Radouani (substituted off) 70' (Bacha, (substituted on) 70'), Lamara, Namani, Djahnit (substituted off) 57' (Kanou, (substituted on) 57'), Merili, Bouzida (substituted off) 65' (Belkacemi, (substituted on) 65'), Bellatreche (substituted off) 65' (Benzaza, (substituted on) 65'), Ateba (substituted off) 57' (Boukhanchouche, (substituted on) 57').

16 April 2024 Quarter-finals	US Biskra	1–3	USM Alger	Annaba
20:30	Siam 23'; Belkacemi (yellow card) 28'; Lakhdari (yellow card) 43'	Report	Bacha 22'; Benzaza (yellow card) 35'; Boukhanchouche (yellow card) 51'; Belaïd (yellow card) 43' (goal) 74'; Belkacemi 78'	Stadium: 19 May 1956 Stadium; Referee: Lahlou Benbraham; Assistant referees: Hamza Bouzit, Amirouche Boufassa; Fourth official: Abdelmoumen Touabti
Note: USM Alger Lineups: Soufi, Belaïd, Bounacer, Radouani, Lamara (substituted off) 87' (Dehiri, (substituted on) 87'), Boukhanchouche, Naamani (substituted off) 68' (Djahnit, (substituted on) 68'), Benzaza (substituted off) 84' (Bouchina, (substituted on) 84'), Bouzida (substituted off) 46' (Kanou, (substituted on) 46'), Bacha (substituted off) 68' (Belkacemi, (substituted on) 68'), Ateba.

24 April 2024 Semi-finals	CR Belouizdad	0–0 (a.e.t.) (3–1 p)	USM Alger	Baraki
21:00	Selmi (yellow card) 37'; Keddad (yellow card) 55'	Report	Benzaza (yellow card) 65'; Boukhanchouche (yellow card) 90'; Bouchina (yellow card) 115'	Stadium: Nelson Mandela Stadium; Referee: Lotfi Bekouassa; Assistant referees: Akram Zarhouni, Adel Abane; Fourth official: Youcef Gamouh
	Penalties
	Laouafi (penalty scored); Benguit (penalty missed); Belkhir (penalty scored); Wamba (penalty scored)		(penalty missed) Belaïd; (penalty missed) Radouani; (penalty missed) Djahnit; (penalty scored) Alilet
Note: USM Alger Lineups: Soufi, Belaïd, Bounacer (substituted off) 82' (Alilet, (substituted on) 82'), Radouani, Lamara (substituted off) 111' (Dehiri, (substituted on) 111'), Boukhanchouche, Benzaza (substituted off) 82' (Bellatreche, (substituted on) 82'), Djahnit, Bacha (substituted off) 65' (Merili, (substituted on) 65'), Ateba (substituted off) 111' (Bouchina, (substituted on) 111'), Kanou (substituted off) 56' (Belkacemi, (substituted on) 56').

=== CAF Super Cup ===
The CAF Super Cup is played as a single match at a neutral venue, with the CAF Champions League winners designated as the "home" team for administrative purposes. If the score is tied at the end of regulation, extra time will not be played, and the penalty shoot-out will be used to determine the winner (CAF Champions League Regulations XXVII and CAF Confederation Cup Regulations XXV).

15 September 2023 Final	Al Ahly (Egypt)	0–1	(Algeria) USM Alger	Taif, Saudi Arabia
21:00 UTC+3	Kahraba (yellow card) 26'; Mohsen (yellow card) 90+4'	Report	Fettouhi (yellow card) 38'; Belaïd 43' (pen.); Embarek (yellow card) 70'; Lamara (yellow card) 90+2'; Alilet (yellow card) 90+6'; Benbot (yellow card) 90+9'	Stadium: King Fahd Stadium; Attendance: 10,000; Referee: Pierre Atcho (Gabon); Assistant referees: Boris Ditsougo (Gabon), Karin Fomo (Cameroon); Fourth official: Issa Sy (Senegal)

=== Confederation Cup ===
==== Qualifying rounds ====
The draw for the qualifying rounds was held on 25 July 2023, 11:00 GMT (14:00 local time, UTC+3), at the CAF headquarters in Cairo, Egypt. In the qualifying rounds, each tie will be played on a home-and-away two-legged basis. If the aggregate score will be tied after the second leg, the away goals rule was applied, and if still tied, extra time will not be played, and the penalty shoot-out will be used to determine the winner (Regulations III. 13 & 14).

===== Second round =====
23 September 2023 (Note: The FUS Rabat v USM Alger match, originally scheduled to be played between 15 or 17 September 2023, was rescheduled to 23 September 2023 due to USM Alger participation in the 2023 CAF Super Cup on 15 September 2023.) First leg	FUS Rabat (Morocco)	1–1	(Algeria) USM Alger	Rabat
20:30 UTC+1	El Ouadghiri (yellow card) 31'; Ajako 84'	Report	Belaïd 45'; Bousseliou (yellow card) 68'; Merili (yellow card) 75'; Embarek (yellow card) 86'	Stadium: Moulay Hassan Stadium; Referee: Muhammad Elmabrouk (Libya); Assistant referees: Mohamed Issa Attia, Wahed Al Jahawe (Libya); Fourth official: Abdulrazg Ahmed (Libya)

1 October 2023 Second leg	USM Alger (Algeria)	0–0 (1–1 agg.)	(Morocco) FUS Rabat	Oran
20:00 UTC+1	Embarek (yellow card) 13'; Alilet (yellow card) 60'; Bousseliou (yellow card) 64'	Report	Karnass (yellow card) 33'; El Msane (yellow card) 60'; Qasmi (yellow card) 90'	Stadium: Miloud Hadefi Stadium; Referee: Sadok Selmi (Tunisia); Assistant referees: Yamen Melloulchi, Youssef Jami (Tunisia); Fourth official: Amir Lousif (Tunisia)

==== Group stage ====
The draw for the group stage was held on 6 October 2023, 12:00 GMT (14:00 local time, UTC+2), in Johannesburg, South Africa. The 16 winners of the second round of qualifying rounds were drawn into four groups of four.

The teams were seeded by their performances in the CAF competitions for the previous five seasons (CAF 5-year ranking points shown next to every team). Each group contained one team from each of Pot 1 and Pot 2, and two teams from Pot 3, and each team was allocated to the positions in their group according to their pot.

Pos	Team	Pld	W	D	L	GF	GA	GD	Pts	Qualification	USMA	MOF	HIL	SSU
1	(Algeria) USM Alger	6	4	1	1	8	3	+5	13	Advance to knockout stage	—	1–0	2–0	2–1
2	(Egypt) Modern Future	6	3	2	1	9	3	+6	11	Advance to knockout stage	0–0	—	5–0	1–0
3	(Libya) Al Hilal Benghazi	6	2	0	4	6	13	−7	6		2–1	1–2	—	2–1
4	(South Africa) SuperSport United	6	1	1	4	5	9	−4	4		0–2	1–1	2–1	—

Source: CAF

26 November 2023 1	USM Alger (Algeria)	2–0	(Libya) Al Hilal Benghazi	Algiers
20:00 UTC+1	Merili 54'; Bouziane (yellow card) 60'; Orebonye 90+4'; Benbot (yellow card) 90'	Report	Al Taeb (yellow card) 43'; Mustafa (yellow card) 50'; Aliaddawi (red card) 90+8'	Stadium: Stade du 5 Juillet; Referee: Kalilou Traoré (Ivory Coast); Assistant referees: Desiré N'goh (Ivory Coast), Nouho Ouattara (Congo DR); Fourth official: Tuoniféré Soro (Ivory Coast)

3 December 2023 2	SuperSport United (South Africa)	0–2	(Algeria) USM Alger	Polokwane
15:00 UTC+2	Margeman (yellow card) 49'; Hamza (yellow card) 60'	Report	Radouani 5'; Orebonye (yellow card) 20'; Kanou (yellow card) 45+2'; Benzaza 56'; Lamara (yellow card) 90+2'	Stadium: Peter Mokaba Stadium; Referee: Georges Gatogato (Burundi); Assistant referees: Emery Niyongabo, Herve Nduwayo (Burundi); Fourth official: Rodrigue Bigirimana (Burundi)

10 December 2023 3	USM Alger (Algeria)	1–0	(Egypt) Future	Algiers
20:00 UTC+1	Kanou 65'; Alilet (yellow card) 73'; Dehiri (yellow card) 76'	Report	Genish (yellow card) 90+2'	Stadium: Stade du 5 Juillet; Referee: Ahmad Heeralall (Mauritius); Assistant referees: Soulaimane Amaldine (Comoros), Jean Marc Pithia (Mauritius); Fourth official: Ganesh Chutooree (Mauritius)

20 December 2023 4	Future (Egypt)	0–0	(Algeria) USM Alger	Cairo
18:00 UTC+2	Shaaban (yellow card) 45'; Farouk (yellow card) 54'; Rabia (yellow card) 88'	Report	Benbot (yellow card) 7'; Bouchina (yellow card) 7'; Benkhelifa (yellow card) 90+5'	Stadium: Al Salam Stadium; Referee: Abdel Aziz Bouh (Mauritania); Assistant referees: Hamdine Diba, Youcef Mohamed (Mauritania); Fourth official: Moussa Diou (Mauritania)

25 February 2024 5	Al Hilal Benghazi (Libya)	2–1	(Algeria) USM Alger	Benghazi
18:00 UTC+2	Al Tawergi 14' (yellow card) 90+2'; Al Taeb 50'; Bem Mohamed (yellow card) 56'; Ayagwa (yellow card) 81'; Al Barrasi (yellow card) 90'	Report	Merili (yellow card) 51'; Chita 63'; Bounacer (yellow card) 64'	Stadium: Benina Martyrs Stadium; Attendance: 0 (close doors); Referee: Haythem Guirat (Tunisia); Assistant referees: Khalil Hassani, Wael Hannachi (Tunisia); Fourth official: Mehrez Malki (Tunisia)

3 March 2024 6	USM Alger (Algeria)	2–1	(South Africa) SuperSport United	Algiers
17:00 UTC+1	Belaïd (yellow card) 21' (yellow-red card) 89'; Bacha 26'; Kanou 76'; Djahnit (yellow card) 90+4'	Report	Matodzi 51'	Stadium: Stade du 5 Juillet; Referee: Adissa Abdul Raphiou Ligali (Benin); Assistant referees: Koudogbo Augustin Kougbemde, Gbemassiandan Narcisse Kouton (Benin); Fourth official: Issa Mouhamed (Benin)

==== knockout stage ====
Each tie in the knockout phase will be played over two legs, with each team playing one leg at home. The team that will score more goals on aggregate over the two legs will advance to the next round. If the aggregate score will be level, the away goals rule will be applied, i.e. the team that will score more goals away from home over the two legs will advance. If away goals will be also equal, then extra time will not be played and the winners will be decided by a penalty shoot-out (Regulations III. 26 & 27).

The draw for the knockout stage (quarter-finals and semi-finals), was held on 12 March 2024, 12:00 GMT (14:00 local time, UTC+2), at the CAF headquarters in Cairo, Egypt.

===== Quarter-finals =====
31 March 2024 First leg	Rivers United (Nigeria)	1–0	(Algeria) USM Alger	Uyo
14:00 UTC+1	Okejepha 10'	Report	Merili (yellow card) 34'	Stadium: Godswill Akpabio International Stadium; Referee: Samuel Uwikunda (Rwanda); Assistant referees: Ivanildo Meirelles (Angola), Modibo Samake (Mali); Fourth official: Boubou Traoré (Mali)

7 April 2024 Second leg	USM Alger (Algeria)	2–0 (2–1 agg.)	(Nigeria) Rivers United	Algiers
22:00 UTC+1	Boukhanchouche (yellow card) 34'; Kanou 37', 74'	Report	Godswill (yellow card) 65'; Okpe (yellow card) 80'; Young Oyowah (yellow card) 90+1'	Stadium: Stade du 5 Juillet; Referee: Pacifique Ndabihawenimana (Burundi); Assistant referees: Mohammed Abdallah Ibrahim (Sudan), Liban Abdourazak Ahmed (Djibouti); Fourth official: Ahmad Imtehaz Heeralall (Mauritius)

==== Semi-finals ====
Due to the issue of the map of Morocco including Western Sahara on RS Berkane’s shirt, both matches were not played. The case was referred to the Court of Arbitration for Sport.

21 April 2024 First leg	USM Alger (Algeria)	0–3; Awarded (Note: Upon arriving to Algeria, RS Berkane official kits were seized by Algerian authorities, who refused to allow them to wear it in the match against USM Alger, due to the shirts featuring a map of Morocco that includes Western Sahara, which is a disputed territory that Morocco claims to be part of their land, while Algeria recognize it as part of the Sahrawi Arab Democratic Republic. The match was cancelled as a result. On 24 April, CAF awarded RS Berkane a 3–0 win.)	(Morocco) RS Berkane	Algiers
20:00 UTC+1		Report		Stadium: Stade du 5 Juillet; Referee: Abdel Aziz Bouh (Mauritania); Assistant referees: Jonathan Koffi Ahonto (Togo), Seydou Tiama (Burkina Faso); Fourth official: Dahane Beida (Mauritania)

28 April 2024 Second leg	RS Berkane (Morocco)	3–0; Awarded (Note: RS Berkane won on walkover after USM Alger withdrew from the match, despite arriving to the stadium. The match was cancelled as a result, and RS Berkane were awarded a 3–0 win on 1 May 2024.) (6–0 agg.)	(Algeria) USM Alger	Berkane
20:00 UTC+1		Report		Stadium: Berkane Municipal Stadium; Referee: Jean-Jacques Ndala Ngambo (RD Congo); Assistant referees: Arsenio Chadreque Maringule (Mozambique), Danek Moutsassi (Republic of Congo); Fourth official: Messie Jessie Oved Nkounkou (Republic of Congo)

== Squad information ==
=== Appearances and goals ===
No.	Pos	Player	Nat	Ligue 1			Algerian Cup			Confederation Cup			CAF Super Cup			Total		
No.	Pos	Player	Nat	App	St	G	App	St	G	App	St	G	App	St	G	App	St	G
Goalkeepers
1	GK	Abdelmoumen Sifour	(Algeria)	1	1	0	0	0	0	0	0	0	0	0	0	1	1	0
16	GK	Kamel Soufi	(Algeria)	15	15	0	3	3	0	0	0	0	0	0	0	18	18	0
25	GK	Oussama Benbot	(Algeria)	14	14	0	2	2	0	10	10	0	1	1	0	27	27	0
Defenders
3	LB	Juba Chirani	(Algeria)	4	2	0	0	0	0	1	0	0	0	0	0	5	2	0
4	CB	Zineddine Belaïd	(Algeria)	18	18	0	4	4	3	9	9	1	1	1	1	32	32	5
5	CB	Mustapha Bouchina	(Algeria)	15	8	0	4	1	1	4	3	0	0	0	0	23	12	1
12	RB	Oussama Barkat	(Algeria)	8	4	0	2	1	1	0	0	0	0	0	0	10	5	0
15	LB	Nabil Lamara	(Algeria)	18	15	0	5	5	0	6	3	0	1	1	0	30	24	0
19	RB	Saâdi Radouani	(Algeria)	28	28	1	4	4	0	10	10	1	1	1	0	43	43	2
20	CB	Hocine Dehiri	(Algeria)	27	22	1	4	1	0	8	7	0	0	0	0	39	30	1
21	CB	Adam Alilet	(Algeria)	14	11	0	3	2	0	7	6	0	1	1	0	25	20	0
81	CB	Abdessamed Bounacer	(Algeria)	20	17	0	3	3	1	6	4	0	0	0	0	29	24	1
39	CB	Aymen Kennen (Note: Player from USM Alger Reserve)	(Algeria)	1	0	0	0	0	0	0	0	0	0	0	0	1	0	0
76	CB	Safieddine Atmania	(Algeria)	2	0	0	0	0	0	0	0	0	0	0	0	2	0	0
Midfielders
6	DM	Oussama Chita	(Algeria)	22	18	0	1	1	0	7	6	1	1	1	0	31	26	1
8	DM	Islam Merili	(Algeria)	22	16	2	2	1	0	9	6	1	1	0	0	34	23	3
10	AM	Sékou Konaté	(Mali)	8	4	1	1	0	0	6	0	0	1	0	0	16	4	1
13	DM	Omar Embarek	(Algeria)	17	8	0	1	0	0	6	4	0	1	0	0	25	12	0
14	DM	Brahim Benzaza	(Algeria)	17	12	3	3	2	0	8	7	1	1	1	0	29	22	4
18	DM	Salim Boukhanchouche	(Algeria)	12	10	1	4	3	0	2	2	0	0	0	0	18	15	1
26	AM	Akram Djahnit	(Algeria)	23	17	1	5	4	4	4	3	0	0	0	0	32	24	5
38	MF	Abdelkrim Namani	(Algeria)	12	6	0	4	3	0	0	0	0	0	0	0	16	9	0
72	AM	Mohamed Ait El Hadj	(Algeria)	12	3	1	0	0	0	5	1	0	0	0	0	17	4	1
Forwards
2	ST	Abderrahmane Bacha	(Algeria)	21	11	4	5	3	1	4	4	1	0	0	0	30	18	6
7	LW	Ismail Belkacemi	(Algeria)	26	15	14	3	0	3	8	6	0	1	1	0	38	22	17
9	ST	Abdoulaye Kanou	(Mali)	24	19	5	5	2	4	10	5	4	1	0	0	40	26	13
11	LW	Mohamed Amine Bouziane	(Algeria)	13	9	2	0	0	0	3	1	0	0	0	0	16	10	2
17	RW	Oussama Bellatreche	(Algeria)	4	4	0	4	2	3	2	0	0	0	0	0	10	6	3
23	LW	Khaled Bousseliou	(Algeria)	11	6	1	2	2	0	5	3	0	1	1	0	19	12	1
24	ST	Leonel Ateba	(Cameroon)	12	9	1	4	3	2	4	4	0	0	0	0	20	16	3
27	RW	Adel Belkacem Bouzida	(Algeria)	1	0	0	3	2	0	0	0	0	0	0	0	4	2	0
31	FW	Mohamed Benazouz	(Algeria)	1	0	0	0	0	0	0	0	0	0	0	0	1	0	0
87	FW	Samy Bouali	(Algeria)	1	1	0	0	0	0	0	0	0	0	0	0	1	1	0
Players transferred out during the season
~~18~~	ST	Tumisang Orebonye	(Botswana)	5	4	0	0	0	0	6	5	1	1	1	0	12	10	1
~~27~~	RW	Abdesslem Bouchouareb	(Algeria)	0	0	0	0	0	0	0	0	0	0	0	0	0	0	0
~~17~~	RW	Nour El Islam Fettouhi	(Algeria)	5	0	0	0	0	0	1	1	0	1	1	0	7	2	0
~~24~~	DM	Taher Benkhelifa	(Algeria)	4	3	0	0	0	0	5	0	0	1	0	0	10	3	0
~~22~~	AM	Kheireddine Toual	(Algeria)	3	1	0	0	0	0	1	0	0	0	0	0	4	1	0
Total				30		40	5		23	10		11	1		1	46		75

Last updated: 14 June 2024
Source: soccerway.com

=== Disciplinary record ===
No.	Pos.	Player	Ligue 1			Algerian Cup			Confederation Cup			CAF Super Cup			Total		
No.	Pos.	Player	Yellow card	(yellow card) (yellow-red card)	Red card	Yellow card	(yellow card) (yellow-red card)	Red card	Yellow card	(yellow card) (yellow-red card)	Red card	Yellow card	(yellow card) (yellow-red card)	Red card	Yellow card	(yellow card) (yellow-red card)	Red card
1	GK	(Algeria) Abdelmoumen Sifour	1	0	0	0	0	0	0	0	0	0	0	0	1	0	0
16	GK	(Algeria) Kamel Soufi	2	0	0	0	0	0	0	0	0	0	0	0	2	0	0
25	GK	(Algeria) Oussama Benbot	3	0	0	0	0	0	2	0	0	1	0	0	6	0	0
4	DF	(Algeria) Zineddine Belaïd	3	0	0	1	0	0	1	1	0	0	0	0	5	1	0
5	DF	(Algeria) Mustapha Bouchina	2	0	0	1	0	0	1	0	0	0	0	0	4	0	0
12	DF	(Algeria) Oussama Barkat	2	0	0	0	0	0	0	0	0	0	0	0	2	0	0
15	DF	(Algeria) Nabil Lamara	1	0	0	0	0	0	1	0	0	1	0	0	3	0	0
19	DF	(Algeria) Saâdi Radouani	4	0	0	0	0	0	0	0	0	0	0	0	4	0	0
20	DF	(Algeria) Hocine Dehiri	4	0	0	0	0	0	1	0	0	0	0	0	5	0	0
21	DF	(Algeria) Adam Alilet	4	0	0	0	0	1	2	0	0	1	0	0	7	0	1
81	DF	(Algeria) Abdessamed Bounacer	8	2	0	0	0	0	1	0	0	0	0	0	9	2	0
6	MF	(Algeria) Oussama Chita	1	0	0	0	0	0	0	0	0	0	0	0	1	0	0
8	MF	(Algeria) Islam Merili	2	0	0	0	0	0	3	0	0	0	0	0	5	0	0
10	MF	(Mali) Sékou Konaté	1	0	0	0	0	0	0	0	0	0	0	0	1	0	0
13	MF	(Algeria) Omar Embarek	6	0	0	0	0	0	2	0	0	1	0	0	9	0	0
14	MF	(Algeria) Brahim Benzaza	4	0	0	2	0	0	0	0	0	0	0	0	6	0	0
18	MF	(Algeria) Salim Boukhanchouche	4	1	0	2	0	0	1	0	0	0	0	0	7	1	0
22	MF	(Algeria) Kheireddine Toual	1	0	0	0	0	0	0	0	0	0	0	0	1	0	0
24	MF	(Algeria) Taher Benkhelifa	0	0	0	0	0	0	1	0	0	0	0	0	1	0	0
26	MF	(Algeria) Akram Djahnit	2	0	0	0	0	0	1	0	0	0	0	0	3	0	0
38	MF	(Algeria) Abdelkrim Namani	1	0	0	1	0	0	0	0	0	0	0	0	2	0	0
2	FW	(Algeria) Abderrahmane Bacha	2	0	0	0	0	0	0	0	0	0	0	0	2	0	0
7	FW	(Algeria) Ismail Belkacemi	3	0	0	1	0	0	0	0	0	0	0	0	4	0	0
9	FW	(Mali) Abdoulaye Kanou	6	0	0	0	0	0	1	0	0	0	0	0	7	0	0
11	FW	(Algeria) Mohamed Amine Bouziane	0	0	0	0	0	0	1	0	0	0	0	0	1	0	0
17	FW	(Algeria) Oussama Bellatreche	1	0	0	0	0	0	0	0	0	0	0	0	1	0	0
17	FW	(Algeria) Nour El Islam Fettouhi	2	0	0	0	0	0	0	0	0	1	0	0	3	0	0
18	FW	(Botswana) Tumisang Orebonye	1	0	0	0	0	0	1	0	0	0	0	0	2	0	0
23	FW	(Algeria) Khaled Bousseliou	1	0	0	0	0	0	2	0	0	0	0	0	3	0	0
Total			72	3	0	8	0	1	22	1	0	5	0	0	107	4	1

=== Goalscorers ===
Includes all competitive matches.

No.	Nat.	Player	Pos.	L1	AC	CCC	CSC	TOTAL
7	(Algeria)	Ismaïl Belkacemi	FW	14	3	0	0	17
9	(Mali)	Abdoulaye Kanou	FW	5	4	4	0	13
2	(Algeria)	Abderrahmane Bacha	FW	4	1	1	0	6
26	(Algeria)	Akram Djahnit	AM	1	4	0	0	5
4	(Algeria)	Zineddine Belaïd	DF	0	3	1	1	5
14	(Algeria)	Brahim Benzaza	MF	3	0	1	0	4
17	(Algeria)	Oussama Bellatreche	FW	0	3	0	0	3
8	(Algeria)	Islam Merili	MF	2	0	1	0	3
24	(Cameroon)	Leonel Ateba	FW	1	2	0	0	3
19	(Algeria)	Saâdi Radouani	DF	1	0	1	0	2
11	(Algeria)	Mohamed Amine Bouziane	FW	2	0	0	0	2
23	(Algeria)	Khaled Bousseliou	LW	1	0	0	0	1
72	(Algeria)	Mohamed Ait El Hadj	MF	1	0	0	0	1
20	(Algeria)	Hocine Dehiri	DF	1	0	0	0	1
81	(Algeria)	Abdessamed Bounacer	DF	0	1	0	0	1
5	(Algeria)	Mustapha Bouchina	DF	0	1	0	0	1
12	(Algeria)	Oussama Barkat	DF	0	1	0	0	1
6	(Algeria)	Oussama Chita	MF	0	0	1	0	1
10	(Mali)	Sékou Konaté	MF	1	0	0	0	1
18	(Algeria)	Salim Boukhanchouche	MF	1	0	0	0	1
~~18~~	(Botswana)	Tumisang Orebonye	FW	0	0	1	0	1
Own Goals				2	0	0	0	2
Totals				40	23	11	1	75

=== Assists ===
No.	Nat.	Player	Pos.	L1	AC	CCC	CSC	TOTAL
14	(Algeria)	Brahim Benzaza	DM	6	0	2	0	8
24	(Cameroon)	Leonel Ateba	ST	1	2	3	0	6
26	(Algeria)	Akram Djahnit	AM	1	4	0	0	5
2	(Algeria)	Abderrahmane Bacha	ST	2	2	0	0	4
9	(Mali)	Abdoulaye Kanou	ST	0	3	1	0	4
19	(Algeria)	Saâdi Radouani	RB	3	1	0	0	4
38	(Algeria)	Abdelkrim Namani	MF	0	3	0	0	3
7	(Algeria)	Ismaïl Belkacemi	ST	2	0	0	0	2
20	(Algeria)	Hocine Dehiri	CB	1	0	1	0	2
72	(Algeria)	Mohamed Ait El Hadj	AM	2	0	0	0	2
12	(Algeria)	Oussama Barkat	RB	1	0	0	0	1
13	(Algeria)	Omar Embarek	DM	1	0	0	0	1
5	(Algeria)	Mustapha Bouchina	CB	1	0	0	0	1
17	(Algeria)	Oussama Bellatreche	RW	0	0	1	0	1
21	(Algeria)	Adam Alilet	CB	0	0	1	0	1
23	(Algeria)	Khaled Bousseliou	LW	0	1	0	0	1
15	(Algeria)	Nabil Lamara	LB	0	0	1	0	1
87	(Algeria)	Samy Bouali	RW	1	0	0	0	1
Totals				22	17	10	0	49

=== Penalties ===
Date	Nation	Name	Opponent	Scored?
15 September 2023	(Algeria)	Zineddine Belaïd	(Egypt) Al Ahly	Penalty scored
18 November 2023	(Algeria)	Zineddine Belaïd	US Biskra	Penalty missed
28 January 2024	(Algeria)	Saâdi Radouani	NC Magra	Penalty scored
8 March 2024	(Algeria)	Zineddine Belaïd	MB Rouissat	Penalty scored

=== Clean sheets ===
Includes all competitive matches.

					Clean sheets				
No.	Nat	Name	GP	GA	L 1	AC	CCC	CSC	Total
1	(Algeria)	Abdelmoumen Sifour	1	2	0	0	0	0	0
16	(Algeria)	Kamel Soufi	18	13	6	2	0	0	8
25	(Algeria)	Oussama Benbot	27	25	2	1	6	1	10
		TOTALS		40	8	3	6	1	18
