= List of Algerian football transfers summer 2025 =

This is a list of Algerian football transfers in the 2025 summer transfer window by club. Clubs in the 2025–26 Algerian Ligue Professionnelle 1 are included.

== Ligue Professionnelle 1 ==
=== ASO Chlef ===
In: Note: Flags indicate national team as defined under FIFA eligibility rules; some limited exceptions apply. Players may hold more than one non-FIFA nationality.

No.	Pos.	Nation	Player

Out: Note: Flags indicate national team as defined under FIFA eligibility rules; some limited exceptions apply. Players may hold more than one non-FIFA nationality.

No.	Pos.	Nation	Player
—	DF	ALG	Abderrahim Hamra (to (Algeria) MC Oran)
—	DF	ALG	Mokhtar Belkhiter (to (Algeria) MC Oran)
—	MF	BOT	Gape Mohutsiwa (to (Algeria) MC Oran)

=== CR Belouizdad ===
In: Note: Flags indicate national team as defined under FIFA eligibility rules; some limited exceptions apply. Players may hold more than one non-FIFA nationality.

No.	Pos.	Nation	Player
—	DF	ALG	Younes Ouassa (from (Algeria) Olympique Akbou)
—	FW	ALB	Redon Xhixha (from (Azerbaijan) Qarabağ FK)
—	MF	ALG	Djaber Kaâssis (from (Algeria) Paradou AC)
—	MF	ALG	Abdennour Belhocini (from (Algeria) CS Constantine)

Out: Note: Flags indicate national team as defined under FIFA eligibility rules; some limited exceptions apply. Players may hold more than one non-FIFA nationality.

No.	Pos.	Nation	Player
—	GK	ALG	Redouane Maachou (to (Algeria) MB Rouissat)
—	MF	ALG	Oussama Daibeche (to (Algeria) ES Sétif)

=== CS Constantine ===
In: Note: Flags indicate national team as defined under FIFA eligibility rules; some limited exceptions apply. Players may hold more than one non-FIFA nationality.

No.	Pos.	Nation	Player
—	DF	ALG	Abdelhamid Driss (from (Algeria) JS Kabylie)

Out: Note: Flags indicate national team as defined under FIFA eligibility rules; some limited exceptions apply. Players may hold more than one non-FIFA nationality.

No.	Pos.	Nation	Player
—	DF	ALG	Aimen Bouguerra (to (Algeria) MC Alger)
—	FW	ALG	Zakaria Benchaâ (to (Bahrain) Al-Fahaheel SC)
—	DF	ALG	Chahine Bellaouel (to (Algeria) JS Kabylie)
—	MF	ALG	Abdennour Belhocini (to (Algeria) CR Belouizdad)

=== ES Sétif ===
In: Note: Flags indicate national team as defined under FIFA eligibility rules; some limited exceptions apply. Players may hold more than one non-FIFA nationality.

No.	Pos.	Nation	Player
—	FW	ALG	Isaad Lakdja (from (Lebanon) Safa SC)
—	DF	ALG	Lahcene Bouziane (from (Algeria) USM El Harrach)
—	DF	ALG	Kamel Hamidi (from (Algeria) MC Alger)
—	FW	GAM	Gibril Sillah (from (Tanzania) Azam)
—	DF	ALG	Aïssa Boudechicha (from (Algeria) MC El Bayadh)
—	MF	ALG	Oussama Daibeche (from (Algeria) CR Belouizdad)
—	DF	ALG	Adda Derder (from (Algeria) RC Kouba)
—	MF	GHA	Salifu Mudasiru (from (Uzbekistan) FC Mash'al)
—	MF	ALG	Hachemi Benslimane (from (Algeria) CS Constantine U21)
—	FW	RWA	Abeddy Biramahire (from (Rwanda) Rayon Sports)

Out: Note: Flags indicate national team as defined under FIFA eligibility rules; some limited exceptions apply. Players may hold more than one non-FIFA nationality.

No.	Pos.	Nation	Player
—	MF	ALG	Taher Benkhelifa (ES Mostaganem)
—	MF	ALG	Bassem Mechaar (Unattached)
—	FW	ALG	Karim Bouhmidi (Unattached)
—	DF	ALG	Mohamed Imad Reguieg (to Paradou AC)
—	FW	ALG	Abdelmouine Ferdjioui (Unattached)
—	MF	BFA	Clément Pitroipa (Unattached)
—	FW	ALG	Mohamed Messaoud Salem (Unattached)

=== ES Ben Aknoun ===
In: Note: Flags indicate national team as defined under FIFA eligibility rules; some limited exceptions apply. Players may hold more than one non-FIFA nationality.

No.	Pos.	Nation	Player

Out: Note: Flags indicate national team as defined under FIFA eligibility rules; some limited exceptions apply. Players may hold more than one non-FIFA nationality.

No.	Pos.	Nation	Player
—	MF	ALG	Kamel Belarbi (to (Algeria) MO Béjaïa)

=== ES Mostaganem ===
In: Note: Flags indicate national team as defined under FIFA eligibility rules; some limited exceptions apply. Players may hold more than one non-FIFA nationality.

No.	Pos.	Nation	Player
—	GK	ALG	Raïs M'Bohli (Unattached)
—	MF	ALG	Taher Benkhelifa (from (Algeria) ES Sétif)
—	MF	ALG	Abdelhafid Benamara (from (Algeria) MC Oran)
—	MF	ALG	Ahmed Gagaâ (from (Libya) Al Sadaqa SC)
—	FW	ALG	Zoubir Motrani (from (Algeria) MC Oran)
—	MF	ALG	Adem Aichouche (from (Algeria) NC Magra U21)
—	MF	ALG	Abdellah El Moudene (from (Algeria) MC El Bayadh)
—	FW	ALG	Karim Bouhmidi (from (Algeria) ES Sétif)
—	FW	ALG	Ali Haroun (from (Algeria) Olympique Akbou)
—	FW	ALG	Abdelhak Askar (from (Algeria) Olympique Akbou)
—	MF	ALG	Sid Ali Lamri (from (Algeria) Olympique Akbou)

Out: Note: Flags indicate national team as defined under FIFA eligibility rules; some limited exceptions apply. Players may hold more than one non-FIFA nationality.

No.	Pos.	Nation	Player
—	MF	ALG	Chakib Aoudjane (to (Algeria) MC Oran)
—	FW	ALG	Ramdane Hitala (to (Algeria) Olympique Akbou)

=== JS Kabylie ===
In: Note: Flags indicate national team as defined under FIFA eligibility rules; some limited exceptions apply. Players may hold more than one non-FIFA nationality.

No.	Pos.	Nation	Player
—	DF	ALG	Mohamed Réda Hamidi (from (Algeria) Paradou AC)
—	FW	ALG	Aymen Mahious (from (Switzerland) Yverdon-Sport)
—	MF	CIV	Josaphat Arthur Bada (from (Tanzania) Singida)
—	DF	ALG	Chahine Bellaouel (from (Algeria) CS Constantine)
—	DF	ALG	Oussama Benatia (from (Algeria) MC Oran)
—	DF	ALG	Hamza Mouali (from (Algeria) MC Alger)

Out: Note: Flags indicate national team as defined under FIFA eligibility rules; some limited exceptions apply. Players may hold more than one non-FIFA nationality.

No.	Pos.	Nation	Player
—	FW	ALG	Adem Redjem (to (Egypt) Modern Sport)
—	DF	ALG	Abdelhamid Driss (to (Algeria) CS Constantine)

=== JS Saoura ===
In: Note: Flags indicate national team as defined under FIFA eligibility rules; some limited exceptions apply. Players may hold more than one non-FIFA nationality.

No.	Pos.	Nation	Player
—	MF	ALG	Constant Wayou (from (Ivory Coast) FC San Pédro)

Out: Note: Flags indicate national team as defined under FIFA eligibility rules; some limited exceptions apply. Players may hold more than one non-FIFA nationality.

No.	Pos.	Nation	Player

=== MB Rouissat ===
In: Note: Flags indicate national team as defined under FIFA eligibility rules; some limited exceptions apply. Players may hold more than one non-FIFA nationality.

No.	Pos.	Nation	Player
—	GK	ALG	Redouane Maachou (from (Algeria) CR Belouizdad)
—	MF	ALG	Alaeddine Belaribi (from (Algeria) MC El Bayadh)
—	FW	ALG	Khayreddine Merzougui (from (Algeria) MC Alger)
—	MF	ALG	Faik Amrane (from (Algeria) NC Magra)
—	DF	ALG	Yacine Zeghad (from (Algeria) MC El Bayadh)
—	DF	CGO	Djigo Saïkou (from (Algeria) US Biskra)

Out: Note: Flags indicate national team as defined under FIFA eligibility rules; some limited exceptions apply. Players may hold more than one non-FIFA nationality.

No.	Pos.	Nation	Player

=== MC Alger ===
In: Note: Flags indicate national team as defined under FIFA eligibility rules; some limited exceptions apply. Players may hold more than one non-FIFA nationality.

No.	Pos.	Nation	Player
—	FW	ALG	Andy Delort (loan return from (France) Montpellier)
—	DF	ALG	Aimen Bouguerra (from (Algeria) CS Constantine)
—	GK	ALG	Alexis Guendouz (from (Iran) Persepolis)

Out: Note: Flags indicate national team as defined under FIFA eligibility rules; some limited exceptions apply. Players may hold more than one non-FIFA nationality.

No.	Pos.	Nation	Player
—	DF	ALG	Kamel Hamidi (to (Algeria) ES Sétif)
—	FW	CIV	Romaric Ouattara (to (Algeria) Olympique Akbou)
—	FW	ALG	Khayreddine Merzougui (to (Algeria) MB Rouissat)
—	DF	CIV	Serge Badjo (Unattached)
—	MF	ALG	Wael Bouzekri (Unattached)
—	GK	ALG	Seif Eddine Belkhir (Unattached)
—	MF	ALG	Mehdi Boussaïd (Unattached)
—	MF	ALG	Zakaria Draoui (USM Alger)
—	DF	ALG	Hamza Mouali (to (Algeria) JS Kabylie)

=== MC El Bayadh ===
In: Note: Flags indicate national team as defined under FIFA eligibility rules; some limited exceptions apply. Players may hold more than one non-FIFA nationality.

No.	Pos.	Nation	Player

Out: Note: Flags indicate national team as defined under FIFA eligibility rules; some limited exceptions apply. Players may hold more than one non-FIFA nationality.

No.	Pos.	Nation	Player
—	MF	ALG	Alaeddine Belaribi (to (Algeria) MB Rouissat)
—	DF	ALG	Aïssa Boudechicha (to (Algeria) ES Sétif)
—	DF	ALG	Yacine Zeghad (to (Algeria) MB Rouissat)
—	DF	ALG	Kheireddine Benamrane (to (Algeria) Olympique Akbou)
—	MF	ALG	Abdellah El Moudene (to (Algeria) ES Mostaganem)

=== MC Oran ===
In: Note: Flags indicate national team as defined under FIFA eligibility rules; some limited exceptions apply. Players may hold more than one non-FIFA nationality.

No.	Pos.	Nation	Player
—	DF	ALG	Abderrahim Hamra (from (Algeria) ASO Chlef)
—	DF	ALG	Mokhtar Belkhiter (from (Algeria) ASO Chlef)
—	MF	BOT	Gape Mohutsiwa (from (Algeria) ASO Chlef)
—	DF	ALG	Oussama Kaddour (from (Algeria) USM Khenchela)
—	MF	ALG	Chakib Aoudjane (from (Algeria) ES Mostaganem)

Out: Note: Flags indicate national team as defined under FIFA eligibility rules; some limited exceptions apply. Players may hold more than one non-FIFA nationality.

No.	Pos.	Nation	Player
—	MF	ALG	Abdelhafid Benamara (to (Algeria) ES Mostaganem)
—	FW	ALG	Karim Aribi (to (Iraq) Al-Talaba SC)
—	FW	ALG	Zoubir Motrani (to (Algeria) ES Mostaganem)
—	DF	ALG	Oussama Benatia (to (Algeria) JS Kabylie)

=== Olympique Akbou ===
In: Note: Flags indicate national team as defined under FIFA eligibility rules; some limited exceptions apply. Players may hold more than one non-FIFA nationality.

No.	Pos.	Nation	Player
—	DF	ALG	Walid Bencherifa (from (Morocco) IR Tanger)
—	FW	CIV	Romaric Ouattara (from (Algeria) MC Alger)
—	DF	ALG	Kheireddine Benamrane (from (Algeria) MC El Bayadh)
—	FW	ALG	Ramdane Hitala (from (Algeria) ES Mostaganem)

Out: Note: Flags indicate national team as defined under FIFA eligibility rules; some limited exceptions apply. Players may hold more than one non-FIFA nationality.

No.	Pos.	Nation	Player
—	DF	ALG	Younes Ouassa (to (Algeria) CR Belouizdad)
—	MF	ALG	Massinissa Benamara (to (Algeria) MO Béjaïa)
—	FW	ALG	Louanas Adjout (Unattached)
—	DF	ALG	Tarek Adouane (Unattached)

=== Paradou AC ===
In: Note: Flags indicate national team as defined under FIFA eligibility rules; some limited exceptions apply. Players may hold more than one non-FIFA nationality.

No.	Pos.	Nation	Player
—	MF	ALG	Abdelkrim Namani (from (Algeria) USM Alger)
—	DF	ALG	Imad Reguieg (from (Algeria) ES Sétif)
—	DF	CIV	Samba Koné (from (Ivory Coast) AFAD Djékanou)

Out: Note: Flags indicate national team as defined under FIFA eligibility rules; some limited exceptions apply. Players may hold more than one non-FIFA nationality.

No.	Pos.	Nation	Player
—	DF	ALG	Mohamed Réda Hamidi (to (Algeria) JS Kabylie)
—	MF	ALG	Djaber Kaâssis (to (Algeria) CR Belouizdad)

=== USM Alger ===
In: Note: Flags indicate national team as defined under FIFA eligibility rules; some limited exceptions apply. Players may hold more than one non-FIFA nationality.

No.	Pos.	Nation	Player
—	DF	ALG	Hocine Dehiri (loan return from (Kuwait) Qadsia SC)
—	MF	ALG	Omar Embarek (loan return from (Algeria) ES Mostaganem)
—	MF	ALG	Kheireddine Toual (loan return from (Algeria) MC El Bayadh)
—	DF	CMR	Che Malone (from (Tanzania) Simba)
—	FW	ALG	Mohamed Bouderbala (from (Algeria) USM El Harrach)
—	MF	ALG	Zakaria Draoui (from (Algeria) MC Alger)

Out: Note: Flags indicate national team as defined under FIFA eligibility rules; some limited exceptions apply. Players may hold more than one non-FIFA nationality.

No.	Pos.	Nation	Player
—	DF	ALG	Imadeddine Azzi (loan return to (Algeria) Kazma)
—	MF	ALG	Oussama Chita (Unattached)
—	DF	COD	Kévin Mondeko (Unattached)
—	MF	BOL	Adalid Terrazas (to (Bolivia) San Antonio Bulo Bulo)
—	MF	ALG	Abdelkrim Namani (to (Algeria) Paradou AC)

=== USM Khenchela ===
In: Note: Flags indicate national team as defined under FIFA eligibility rules; some limited exceptions apply. Players may hold more than one non-FIFA nationality.

No.	Pos.	Nation	Player

Out: Note: Flags indicate national team as defined under FIFA eligibility rules; some limited exceptions apply. Players may hold more than one non-FIFA nationality.

No.	Pos.	Nation	Player
—	DF	ALG	Oussama Kaddour (to (Algeria) MC Oran)
