= List of Algerian football transfers winter 2024–25 =

This is a list of Algerian football transfers in the 2024–25 winter transfer window by club. clubs in the 2024–25 Algerian Ligue Professionnelle 1 are included.

== Ligue Professionnelle 1 ==
=== ASO Chlef ===
In: Note: Flags indicate national team as defined under FIFA eligibility rules; some limited exceptions apply. Players may hold more than one non-FIFA nationality.

| No. | Pos. | Nation | Player |
|---|---|---|---|
| — | FW | LBR | Edward Ledlum (from (Liberia) Paynesville FC) |
| — | FW | ALG | Zineddine Boutmène (Unattached) |
| — | FW | TOG | Kokou Avotor (from (Togo) AS OTR Lomé) |

Out: Note: Flags indicate national team as defined under FIFA eligibility rules; some limited exceptions apply. Players may hold more than one non-FIFA nationality.

| No. | Pos. | Nation | Player |
|---|---|---|---|
| — | MF | ALG | Abderrahmane Bourdim (to (Algeria) MC Oran) |

=== CR Belouizdad ===
In: Note: Flags indicate national team as defined under FIFA eligibility rules; some limited exceptions apply. Players may hold more than one non-FIFA nationality.

| No. | Pos. | Nation | Player |

Out: Note: Flags indicate national team as defined under FIFA eligibility rules; some limited exceptions apply. Players may hold more than one non-FIFA nationality.

| No. | Pos. | Nation | Player |
|---|---|---|---|
| — | FW | ALG | Islam Slimani (loan to (Belgium) Westerlo) |
| — | DF | ALG | Mouad Hadded (to (Libya) Al-Ahly Benghazi) |
| — | DF | ALG | Mohamed Azzi (to (Russia) Dynamo Makhachkala) |

=== ES Sétif ===
In: Note: Flags indicate national team as defined under FIFA eligibility rules; some limited exceptions apply. Players may hold more than one non-FIFA nationality.

| No. | Pos. | Nation | Player |
|---|---|---|---|
| — | FW | ALG | Karim Bouhmidi (from (Luxembourg) Swift Hesperange) |
| — | FW | NGA | Kingsley Eduwo (from (Tunisia) Club Africain) |
| — | MF | BFA | Clément Pitroipa (from (Burkina Faso) AS Douanes) |

Out: Note: Flags indicate national team as defined under FIFA eligibility rules; some limited exceptions apply. Players may hold more than one non-FIFA nationality.

| No. | Pos. | Nation | Player |
|---|---|---|---|
| — | FW | ALG | Abdouel Ali Hadji (Unattached) |
| — | MF | MLI | Salam Jiddou (Unattached) |
| — | FW | ALG | Moulay Abdelaziz (to (Algeria) MC Oran) |
| — | FW | ALG | Abdouel Ali Hadji (to (Algeria) US Biskra) |

=== ES Mostaganem ===
In: Note: Flags indicate national team as defined under FIFA eligibility rules; some limited exceptions apply. Players may hold more than one non-FIFA nationality.

| No. | Pos. | Nation | Player |
|---|---|---|---|
| — | DF | ALG | Djamel Benlamri (Unattached) |
| — | MF | ALG | Omar Embarek (loan from (Algeria) USM Alger) |

Out: Note: Flags indicate national team as defined under FIFA eligibility rules; some limited exceptions apply. Players may hold more than one non-FIFA nationality.

| No. | Pos. | Nation | Player |
|---|---|---|---|
| — | MF | ALG | Toufik Addadi (to (Algeria) Olympique Akbou) |

=== JS Kabylie ===
In: Note: Flags indicate national team as defined under FIFA eligibility rules; some limited exceptions apply. Players may hold more than one non-FIFA nationality.

| No. | Pos. | Nation | Player |
|---|---|---|---|
| — | DF | ALG | Mehdi Boudjemaa (from (Turkey) Çorum) |
| — | MF | ALG | Reda Benchaa (from (Kuwait) Kazma SC) |
| — | FW | RUS | Ivan Ignatyev (from (Armenia) FC Urartu) |

Out: Note: Flags indicate national team as defined under FIFA eligibility rules; some limited exceptions apply. Players may hold more than one non-FIFA nationality.

| No. | Pos. | Nation | Player |
|---|---|---|---|
| — | FW | BFA | Djibril Ouattara (Unattached) |
| — | MF | ALG | Sid Ahmed Maatallah (loan to (Algeria) JS Saoura) |
| — | FW | ALG | Lounes Adjout (to (Algeria) Olympique Akbou) |

=== JS Saoura ===
In: Note: Flags indicate national team as defined under FIFA eligibility rules; some limited exceptions apply. Players may hold more than one non-FIFA nationality.

| No. | Pos. | Nation | Player |
|---|---|---|---|
| — | DF | ALG | Yacouba Doumbia (Unattached) |
| — | MF | ALG | Juba Oukaci (from (Algeria) Olympique Akbou) |
| — | GK | ALG | Abdelkader Morcely (from (Algeria) Paradou AC) |
| — | MF | ALG | Sid Ahmed Maatallah (loan from (Algeria) JS Kabylie) |
| — | DF | ALG | Nasreddine Zaalani (from (Bahrain) Al-Khaldiya SC) |
| — | FW | CIV | Guy Stéphane Bédi (from (Ivory Coast) FC San Pédro) |

Out: Note: Flags indicate national team as defined under FIFA eligibility rules; some limited exceptions apply. Players may hold more than one non-FIFA nationality.

| No. | Pos. | Nation | Player |
|---|---|---|---|
| — | MF | ALG | Yacine Medane (to (Algeria) US Biskra) |

=== MC Alger ===
In: Note: Flags indicate national team as defined under FIFA eligibility rules; some limited exceptions apply. Players may hold more than one non-FIFA nationality.

| No. | Pos. | Nation | Player |
|---|---|---|---|
| — | FW | GUI | Mohamed Saliou Bangoura (from (Guinea) Hafia FC) |
| — | MF | ALG | Sid Ahmed Aissaoui (from (Russia) CSKA Moscow) |
| — | MF | ALG | Mehdi Boussaïd (from (United Arab Emirates) Hatta Club) |

Out: Note: Flags indicate national team as defined under FIFA eligibility rules; some limited exceptions apply. Players may hold more than one non-FIFA nationality.

| No. | Pos. | Nation | Player |
|---|---|---|---|
| — | MF | ALG | Dalil Hassen Khodja (to (Algeria) MC Oran) |
| — | FW | ALG | Andy Delort (loan to (France) Montpellier) |

=== MC El Bayadh ===
In: Note: Flags indicate national team as defined under FIFA eligibility rules; some limited exceptions apply. Players may hold more than one non-FIFA nationality.

| No. | Pos. | Nation | Player |

Out: Note: Flags indicate national team as defined under FIFA eligibility rules; some limited exceptions apply. Players may hold more than one non-FIFA nationality.

| No. | Pos. | Nation | Player |
|---|---|---|---|
| — | DF | ALG | Anis Khemaissia (to (Libya) Al-Hilal SC) |

=== MC Oran ===
In: Note: Flags indicate national team as defined under FIFA eligibility rules; some limited exceptions apply. Players may hold more than one non-FIFA nationality.

| No. | Pos. | Nation | Player |
|---|---|---|---|
| — | MF | ALG | Abderrahmane Bourdim (from (Algeria) ASO Chlef) |
| — | FW | ALG | Moulay Abdelaziz (from (Algeria) ES Sétif) |
| — | MF | ALG | Dalil Hassen Khodja (from (Algeria) MC Alger) |

Out: Note: Flags indicate national team as defined under FIFA eligibility rules; some limited exceptions apply. Players may hold more than one non-FIFA nationality.

| No. | Pos. | Nation | Player |
|---|---|---|---|
| — | MF | CIV | Sery Gnoleba (Unattached) |
| — | MF | ALG | Aymen Chadli (Unattached) |
| — | FW | ALG | Oualid Ardji (to (Algeria) RC Kouba) |
| — | FW | ALG | Merouane Boussalem (Unattached) |
| — | MF | ALG | Yanis Hamache (Unattached) |

=== Olympique Akbou ===
In: Note: Flags indicate national team as defined under FIFA eligibility rules; some limited exceptions apply. Players may hold more than one non-FIFA nationality.

| No. | Pos. | Nation | Player |
|---|---|---|---|
| — | MF | ALG | Toufik Addadi (from (Algeria) ES Mostaganem) |
| — | FW | ALG | Lounes Adjout (from (Algeria) JS Kabylie) |

Out: Note: Flags indicate national team as defined under FIFA eligibility rules; some limited exceptions apply. Players may hold more than one non-FIFA nationality.

| No. | Pos. | Nation | Player |
|---|---|---|---|
| — | DF | ALG | Zidane Mebarakou (Unattached) |
| — | MF | ALG | Juba Oukaci (to (Algeria) JS Saoura) |

=== NC Magra ===
In: Note: Flags indicate national team as defined under FIFA eligibility rules; some limited exceptions apply. Players may hold more than one non-FIFA nationality.

| No. | Pos. | Nation | Player |
|---|---|---|---|
| — | MF | ALG | Khalid Dahamni (from (Algeria) Olympique Akbou) |
| — | FW | MTN | Yassin Cheikh El Welly (from (Tunisia) US Monastir) |
| — | FW | ALG | Mohamed Amine Benmessabih (from (Algeria) CS Constantine) |
| — | MF | ALG | Abdeldjalil Ould Ammar (from (Algeria) JS Saoura) |
| — | MF | MLI | Salam Jiddou (from (Algeria) ES Sétif) |
| — | DF | ALG | Moncef Merouani (from (Algeria) JS Saoura) |

Out: Note: Flags indicate national team as defined under FIFA eligibility rules; some limited exceptions apply. Players may hold more than one non-FIFA nationality.

| No. | Pos. | Nation | Player |

=== Paradou AC ===
In: Note: Flags indicate national team as defined under FIFA eligibility rules; some limited exceptions apply. Players may hold more than one non-FIFA nationality.

| No. | Pos. | Nation | Player |
|---|---|---|---|
| — | GK | ALG | Ahmed Abdelkader (Unattached) |
| — | MF | ALG | Mohamed Ait El Hadj (from (Algeria) USM Alger) |
| — | DF | ALG | Sabri Cheraitia (Unattached) |
| — | FW | ALG | Youssouf Dao (Unattached) |

Out: Note: Flags indicate national team as defined under FIFA eligibility rules; some limited exceptions apply. Players may hold more than one non-FIFA nationality.

| No. | Pos. | Nation | Player |

=== US Biskra ===
In: Note: Flags indicate national team as defined under FIFA eligibility rules; some limited exceptions apply. Players may hold more than one non-FIFA nationality.

| No. | Pos. | Nation | Player |
|---|---|---|---|
| — | MF | ALG | Yacine Medane (from (Algeria) JS Saoura) |
| — | FW | ALG | Abdouel Ali Hadji (from (Algeria) ES Sétif) |
| — | FW | ALG | Merouane Boussalem (from (Algeria) MC Oran) |
| — | DF | ALG | Ameur El Omrani (from (Tunisia) Club Africain) |
| — | DF | CGO | Servyl Akouala (from (Republic of the Congo) JS Talangaï) |
| — | DF | CGO | Djigo Saïkou (from (Republic of the Congo) AC Léopards) |

Out: Note: Flags indicate national team as defined under FIFA eligibility rules; some limited exceptions apply. Players may hold more than one non-FIFA nationality.

| No. | Pos. | Nation | Player |

=== USM Alger ===
In: Note: Flags indicate national team as defined under FIFA eligibility rules; some limited exceptions apply. Players may hold more than one non-FIFA nationality.

| No. | Pos. | Nation | Player |
|---|---|---|---|
| — | FW | ALG | Ahmed Khaldi (from (Kuwait) Al-Arabi SC) |
| — | FW | ALG | Riad Benayad (from (Tunisia) Espérance de Tunis) |
| — | FW | ALG | Mehdi Merghem (from (Portugal) Farense) |
| — | DF | ALG | Haithem Loucif (from (Switzerland) Yverdon-Sport) |
| — | FW | BDI | Bonfils-Caleb Bimenyimana (from (Iran) Zob Ahan) |

Out: Note: Flags indicate national team as defined under FIFA eligibility rules; some limited exceptions apply. Players may hold more than one non-FIFA nationality.

| No. | Pos. | Nation | Player |
|---|---|---|---|
| — | FW | SEN | Sekou Gassama (to (Spain) CD Eldense) |
| — | MF | ALG | Hocine Dehiri (loan to (Kuwait) Qadsia SC) |
| — | MF | ALG | Mohamed Ait El Hadj (to (Algeria) Paradou AC) |
| — | MF | ALG | Omar Embarek (loan to (Algeria) ES Mostaganem) |
| — | FW | ALG | Ismail Belkacemi (to (Libya) Al Ahli SC) |

=== USM Khenchela ===
In: Note: Flags indicate national team as defined under FIFA eligibility rules; some limited exceptions apply. Players may hold more than one non-FIFA nationality.

| No. | Pos. | Nation | Player |

Out: Note: Flags indicate national team as defined under FIFA eligibility rules; some limited exceptions apply. Players may hold more than one non-FIFA nationality.

| No. | Pos. | Nation | Player |
|---|---|---|---|
| — | DF | ALG | Ibrahim Hachoud (to (Libya) Al-Hilal SC) |
