= Abdessamed Bounacer =

Algerian footballer (born 2004)

Personal information
- Date of birth: 11 December 2004 (age 21)
- Place of birth: Staouéli, Algeria
- Height: 1.88 m (6 ft 2 in)
- Position: Centre-back

Team information
- Current team: Al-Shamal (on loan from Al Sadd)
- Number: 81

Youth career
- 2021–2022: USM Alger

Senior career*
Years	Team	Apps	(Gls)
2022–2024	USM Alger	22	(0)
2024–	Al Sadd	4	(0)
2025–	→ Al-Shamal (loan)	3	(0)

International career
2022	Algeria U18	3	(0)
- * Club domestic league appearances and goals as of 14 June 2024

Abdessamed Bounacer (Arabic: عبد الصمد بوناصر; born December 11, 2004) is an Algerian professional footballer who plays for Al-Shamal, on loan from Al Sadd in the Qatar Stars League.

== Club career ==
=== USM Alger ===
On March 19, 2023, Abdessamed Bounacer made his first senior appearance with USM Alger as a starter against FC Saint-Éloi Lupopo in the 2022–23 CAF Confederation Cup, becoming the youngest player to represent USM Alger in Africa at the age of 18. His appearance came days after his club announced that Bounacer was invited to trials with Paris FC and FC Sochaux. On April 11, the technical staff gave Bounacer the green light to conduct experiments in Europe. On June 3, 2023, Bounacer won the first title in his football career by winning the 2022–23 CAF Confederation Cup after defeating Young Africans of Tanzania. On 15 September 2023, Bounacer won the CAF Super Cup title after winning against Al Ahly, it is the second African title with USM Alger in three months. On June 19, 2024, Abdessamed Bounacer renewed his contract for two seasons, and this will continue until June 2027.

=== Al Sadd ===
On July 24, 2024, Al Sadd announced its official contract with Abdessamed Bounacer for a period of five years. Bounacer suffered a very serious injury during training. The club announced that he will undergo ankle surgery at Aspetar and that he will be out for three months, with a return in November or December.

== International career ==
In June 2022, Bounacer was part of the Algeria national under-18 football team at the 2022 Mediterranean Games in Oran, Algeria.

== Career statistics ==
=== Club ===
As of 14 June 2026

Club	Season	League			Cup		Continental		Other		Total	
Club	Season	Division	Apps	Goals	Apps	Goals	Apps	Goals	Apps	Goals	Apps	Goals
USM Alger	2022–23	Ligue 1	2	0	—		4 (Note: All appearance(s) in CAF Confederation Cup)	0	—		6	0
USM Alger	2023–24	Ligue 1	20	0	3	1	6	0	—		29	1
USM Alger	Total		22	0	3	1	10	0	—		35	1
Al Sadd SC	2024–25	QSL	4	0	0	0	1 (Note: All appearance(s) in AFC Champions League Elite)	0	—		5	0
Al Sadd SC	2026–27	QSL	0	0	0	0	—		—		0	0
Al Sadd SC	Total		0	0	0	0	0	0	—		0	0
Al-Shamal SC (loan)	2025–26	QSL	20	0	1	0	—		3 (Note: All appearance(s) in Qatar Cup)	2	24	2
Career total			22	0	3	1	10	0	3	2	35	1

== Honours ==
USM Alger

- CAF Confederation Cup: 2022–23
- CAF Super Cup: 2023

Al Sadd SC

- Qatar Stars League: 2024–25
