= Oussama Barkat =

Algerian professional footballer (born 2001)

Personal information
- Full name: Oussama Barkat
- Date of birth: 29 January 2001 (age 25)
- Place of birth: Constantine, Algeria
- Position: Right-back

Team information
- Current team: Paradou AC
- Number: 27

Youth career
- –2020: CS Constantine

Senior career*
Years	Team	Apps	(Gls)
2020–2022	CS Constantine	3	(0)
2022–2023	MO Constantine		
2023–2024	USM Alger	7	(0)
2024–2025	US Biskra	9	(0)
2025	NC Magra	12	(0)
2026	AS Khroub	1	(0)
2026–	Paradou AC	0	(0)
- * Club domestic league appearances and goals as of 16 August 2026

Oussama Barkat (Arabic: أسامة بركات; born 29 January 2001) is an Algerian footballer who plays for Paradou AC.

== Career ==
In 2023, Barkat joined USM Alger. In August 2024, he joined US Biskra. In 2025, Barkat joined NC Magra. In January 2026, he joined AS Khroub.

== Honours ==
USM Alger

- CAF Super Cup: 2023
