= Abderrahmane Bacha =

Algerian footballer (born 1999)

Personal information
- Date of birth: 21 December 1999 (age 26)
- Place of birth: Sidi Moussa, Algeria
- Height: 1.70 m (5 ft 7 in)
- Position: Forward

Team information
- Current team: Paradou AC
- Number: 2

Senior career*
Years	Team	Apps	(Gls)
2021–2022	JS Bordj Ménaïel		
2022–2024	USM Alger	36	(5)
2023	→ USM Khenchela (loan)	7	(0)
2024-2025	ES Sétif	22	(3)
2025–	Paradou AC	13	(0)
- * Club domestic league appearances and goals as of 5 June 2026

Abderrahmane Bacha (Arabic: عبد الرحمن باشا; born 21 December 1999) is an Algerian professional footballer who plays for Paradou AC in the Algerian Ligue Professionnelle 1.

== Career ==
On 30 June 2022, Bacha joined USM Alger who signed up for two seasons coming from JS Bordj Ménaïel. On 5 February 2023, Bacha was loaned to USM Khenchela for six months, a last minute transfer which materialized during the last hours of the winter transfer window. On 15 March 2024, Bacha scored the winning goal in the derby against CR Belouizdad. Four days later, Bacha scored another goal against ES Setif and provided an assist for Abdoulaye Kanou after a beautiful deep pass. The match ended in a 2–0 victory. After being out of favor under previous coach Abdelhak Benchikha, Juan Carlos Garrido brought him back and was satisfied with his new role. Better yet Bacha became a regular starter often proving decisive thanks to his goals and assists.

Abderrahmane Bacha's contract has come to an end but has an amendment signed with the club's previous management, to extend his contract for two additional seasons. Finally, this amendment should not be approved by the Ligue de Football Professionnel for the simple reason that it was not filed within the time limit with this structure. “Any convention, special agreements, modification of the contract must give rise to an amendment subject to approval within fifteen days from the date of its signature”, Bacha should leave without compensation.

== Career statistics ==
As of 14 June 2024

Club	Season	League			Cup		Continental		Other		Total	
Club	Season	Division	Apps	Goals	Apps	Goals	Apps	Goals	Apps	Goals	Apps	Goals
USM Alger	2022–23	Ligue 1	12	1	—		4 (Note: All appearance(s) in CAF Confederation Cup)	0	—		16	1
USM Alger	2023–24	Ligue 1	21	4	5	1	4	1	—		30	6
Total			33	5	5	1	8	1	—		46	7
Career total			0	0	0	0	0	0	—		0	0
