= Abdelkrim Namani =

Algerian footballer (born 2003)

Personal information
- Date of birth: 13 May 2003 (age 23)
- Place of birth: El Attaf, Algeria
- Position: Midfielder

Team information
- Current team: ES Mostaganem
- Number: 28

Youth career
- –2023: USM Alger

Senior career*
Years	Team	Apps	(Gls)
2022–2025	USM Alger	20	(0)
2025–2026	Paradou AC	3	(0)
2026–	ES Mostaganem	11	(1)
- * Club domestic league appearances and goals as of 31 January 2026

Abdelkrim Namani (Arabic: عبد الكريم نعماني; born 13 May 2003) is an Algerian professional footballer who plays for Paradou AC in the Algerian Ligue Professionnelle 1.

== Career ==
On 17 June 2022, Namani made his first league appearance against ES Sétif. On 20 June 2024, Namani extended his contract with USM Alger until 2028. In August 2025, he signed for Paradou AC. On 31 January 2026, he joined ES Mostaganem.

== Career statistics ==
=== Club ===
As of 14 June 2024

Club	Season	League			Cup		Continental		Other		Total	
Club	Season	Division	Apps	Goals	Apps	Goals	Apps	Goals	Apps	Goals	Apps	Goals
USM Alger	2021–22	Ligue 1	1	0	—		—		—		1	0
USM Alger	2022–23	Ligue 1	2	0	—		—		—		2	0
USM Alger	2023–24	Ligue 1	12	0	4	0	—		—		16	0
Total			15	0	4	0	—		—		19	0
Career total			15	0	4	0	—		—		19	0

== Honours ==
USM Alger

- Algerian Cup: 2024–25
