= Tumisang Orebonye =

Motswana footballer

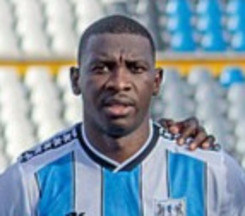

Personal information
- Full name: Tumisang Orebonye
- Date of birth: 26 March 1996 (age 30)
- Place of birth: Palapye, Botswana
- Height: 1.80 m (5 ft 11 in)
- Position: Centre-forward

Team information
- Current team: Al-Shomooa
- Number: 9

Senior career*
| Years | Team | Apps | (Gls) |
| 2015–2016 | Motlakase Power Dynamos | | |
| 2016–2018 | Gaborone United | | |
| 2018–2020 | Township Rollers | | |
| 2020–2023 | OC Khourigba | 45 | (8) |
| 2023–2024 | USM Alger | 16 | (0) |
| 2024–2025 | AS FAR | 29 | (7) |
| 2025 | Al-Ittihad Tripoli | 14 | (3) |
| 2025–2026 | Wydad | 4 | (0) |
| 2026– | Al-Shomooa | 7 | (0) |

International career^{‡}
| 2017– | Botswana | 66 | (9) |
- * Club domestic league appearances and goals as of 2 August 2026 ‡ National team caps and goals as of 24 September 2026

Tumisang Orebonye (born 26 March 1996) is a Motswana footballer who plays as a centre-forward for Libyan Premier League club Al-Shomooa and the Botswana national team. Orebonye was the first Botswana player to win a continental title, winning the CAF Confederation Cup in 2023 with USM Alger.

== Club career ==
=== USM Alger ===
On 1 February 2023, Orebonye joined USM Alger on a two-and-a-half-year contract, leaving Moroccan side OC Khouribga. His registration was delayed as he was serving a suspension imposed by the Royal Moroccan Football Federation, which prevented him from appearing in domestic competition until February. Orebonye made his debut for the club in the CAF Confederation Cup during a win against Saint-Éloi Lupopo. A week later in the same competition against Al Akhdar, Orebonye scored his first goal for the club.

On 3 June 2023, Orebonye won the first title with his team by winning the CAF Confederation Cup, where he became the first Botswana player to win a continental title. He later won a second continental honour with USM Alger, the 2023 CAF Super Cup, following a victory over Al Ahly in September.

In January 2024, USM Alger terminated Orebonye’s contract by mutual agreement, allowing him to leave the club as a free agent.

=== AS FAR ===
Shortly after leaving Algeria, Orebonye returned to Morocco to sign with AS FAR Rabat on a two-and-a-half-year deal in early January 2024.

=== Al-Ittihad Tripoli ===
Orebonye’s stay at AS FAR was followed by another move: in February 2025, Libyan side Al Ittihad Tripoli activated his release clause, reported to be around US$500,000, to secure his services from AS FAR, linking him up with coach Juan Carlos Garrido, who had previously coached him at USM Alger.

== International career ==
On March 25, 2017, Tumisang Orebonye played his first match with the Botswana national team against Tanzania in a friendly match. On September 30, 2018, Orebonye scored his first goal in Botswana colors against Namibia. On July 10, 2021, Orebonye scored a hat-trick against Lesotho in the group stage of the COSAFA Cup.

== Career statistics ==
=== Club ===
As of 5 January 2024

| Club | Season | League | | | Cup | | Continental | | Other | | Total | |
| Club | Season | Division | Apps | Goals | Apps | Goals | Apps | Goals | Apps | Goals | Apps | Goals |
|---|---|---|---|---|---|---|---|---|---|---|---|---|
| OC Khourigba | 2021–22 | Botola | 29 | 7 | 1 | 0 | — | | — | | 30 | 7 |
| OC Khourigba | 2022–23 | Botola | 11 | 0 | — | | — | | — | | 11 | 0 |
| Total | | | 40 | 7 | 1 | 0 | — | | — | | 41 | 7 |
| USM Alger | 2022–23 | Ligue 1 | 11 | 0 | — | | 12 (Note: All appearance(s) in CAF Confederation Cup) | 1 | — | | 23 | 1 |
| USM Alger | 2023–24 | Ligue 1 | 5 | 0 | 0 | 0 | 7 (Note: one appearance in CAF Super Cup, six appearances and one goal in CAF Confederation Cup) | 1 | — | | 9 | 1 |
| Total | | | 16 | 0 | 0 | 0 | 19 | 2 | — | | 35 | 2 |
| Career total | | | 56 | 7 | 1 | 0 | 19 | 2 | — | | 76 | 9 |

=== International ===
As of match played 24 September 2026

Appearances and goals by national team and year
| National team | Year | Apps | Goals |
|---|---|---|---|
| Botswana | 2017 | 9 | 0 |
| Botswana | 2018 | 9 | 1 |
| Botswana | 2019 | 12 | 0 |
| Botswana | 2020 | 2 | 1 |
| Botswana | 2021 | 3 | 3 |
| Botswana | 2022 | 4 | 0 |
| Botswana | 2023 | 5 | 0 |
| Botswana | 2024 | 12 | 1 |
| Botswana | 2025 | 9 | 1 |
| Botswana | 2026 | 1 | 2 |
| Total | | 66 | 9 |

Scores and results list Botswana's goal tally first, score column indicates score after each Orebonye goal.

List of international goals scored by Tumisang Orebonye
| No. | Date | Venue | Opponent | Score | Result | Competition | Ref. |
|---|---|---|---|---|---|---|---|
| 1 | 30 September 2018 | Botswana National Stadium, Gaborone, Botswana | Namibia | 1–0 | 1–0 | Friendly | |
| 2 | 12 November 2020 | National Heroes Stadium, Lusaka, Zambia | Zambia | 1–0 | 1–2 | 2021 Africa Cup of Nations qualification | |
| 3 | 10 July 2021 | Wolfson Stadium, Ibhayi, South Africa | Lesotho | 1–0 | 4–0 | 2021 COSAFA Cup | |
| 4 | 10 July 2021 | Wolfson Stadium, Ibhayi, South Africa | Lesotho | 2–0 | 4–0 | 2021 COSAFA Cup | |
| 5 | 10 July 2021 | Wolfson Stadium, Ibhayi, South Africa | Lesotho | 3–0 | 4–0 | 2021 COSAFA Cup | |
| 6 | 10 October 2024 | Estádio Nacional, Praia, Cape Verde | Cape Verde | 1–0 | 1–0 | 2025 Africa Cup of Nations qualification | |
| 7 | 18 December 2025 | Tabarka Training Center, Tabarka, Tunisia | Tunisia | 1–0 | 1–2 | Friendly | |
| 8 | 24 September 2026 | Tripoli Stadium, Tripoli, Libya | Libya | 1–0 | 2–2 | 2027 Africa Cup of Nations qualification | |
| 9 | 24 September 2026 | Tripoli Stadium, Tripoli, Libya | Libya | 2–0 | 2–2 | 2027 Africa Cup of Nations qualification | |

== Honours ==
Township Rollers

- Botswana Premier League: 2018-19

USM Alger

- CAF Confederation Cup: 2022–23
- CAF Super Cup: 2023

Individual

- FUB Young Player of the Season: 2017
- Mascom Top 8 Cup Top Goalscorer: 2019
