= Islam Merili =

Algerian footballer (born 1998)

Personal information
- Date of birth: 27 June 1998 (age 28)
- Place of birth: El Attaf, Algeria
- Position: Midfielder

Team information
- Current team: Al Ahly SC
- Number: 26

Youth career
- –2016: ASO Chlef

Senior career*
Years	Team	Apps	(Gls)
2016–2022	ASO Chlef	88	(3)
2022–2026	USM Alger	82	(4)
2026–	Al Ahly SC	0	(0)

International career^{‡}
2018–2019	Algeria U23	2	(0)
- * Club domestic league appearances and goals as of 04 October 2026 ‡ National team caps and goals as of 19 February 2019

Islam Merili (Arabic: إسلام مريلي; born 27 June 1998) is an Algerian professional footballer who plays as a midfielder for Al Ahly SC.

== Career ==
=== USM Alger ===
On 8 February 2022, Islam Merili signed a two-year and a half contract with USM Alger. Free from any commitment, he was coveted by several clubs, notably MC Alger, but Merili opted for L'USMA after an agreement with sports director Hocine Achiou. Usmist supporters have no idea about the new recruit and they expect to see him form a good duo with Brahim Benzaza after playing together for several seasons with ASO Chlef. On 9 November 2022, Minutes after he came on as a substitute, Merili scored the winning goal against Cape Town City, as the first goal in the colors of USM Alger and qualified for the group stage of the CAF Confederation Cup.

On 3 June 2023, Merili won the first title in his football career by winning the 2022–23 CAF Confederation Cup after defeating Young Africans of Tanzania. On 16 August 2023, Islam Merili renewed his contract for two seasons until 2026 along with nine other players. On 15 September 2023, Merili won the CAF Super Cup title after winning against Al Ahly, it is the second African title with USM Alger in three months.

=== Al Ahly SC ===
On 13 June 2026, he joined Libyan club Al Ahly SC.

== Career statistics ==
=== Club ===
As of 6 June 2026

Appearances and goals by club, season and competition
Club	Season	League			Cup		Continental		Other		Total	
Club	Season	Division	Apps	Goals	Apps	Goals	Apps	Goals	Apps	Goals	Apps	Goals
ASO Chlef	2016–17	Ligue 2	2	1	—		—		—		2	1
ASO Chlef	2017–18	Ligue 2	11	0	—		—		—		11	0
ASO Chlef	2018–19	Ligue 2	29	0	—		—		—		29	0
ASO Chlef	2019–20	Ligue 1	9	0	—		—		—		9	0
ASO Chlef	2020–21	Ligue 1	29	2	—		—		—		29	2
ASO Chlef	2021–22	Ligue 1	9	0	—		—		—		9	0
ASO Chlef	Total		89	3	—		—		—		89	3
USM Alger	2021–22	Ligue 1	5	0	—		—		—		5	0
USM Alger	2022–23	Ligue 1	19	2	1	0	12 (Note: All appearance(s) in CAF Confederation Cup)	2	—		32	4
USM Alger	2023–24	Ligue 1	22	2	2	0	10 (Note: one appearance in CAF Super Cup, nine appearances and one goal in CAF Confederation Cup)	1	—		34	3
USM Alger	2024–25	Ligue 1	16	0	4	0	6	1	—		26	1
USM Alger	2025–26	Ligue 1	20	0	6	0	13	0	1 (Note: All appearances in Algerian Super Cup)	0	40	0
USM Alger	Total		82	4	13	0	41	4	1	0	137	8
Career total			171	7	13	0	41	4	1	0	226	11

== Honours ==
USM Alger

- Algerian Cup: 2024–25, 2025–26
- CAF Confederation Cup: 2022–23,2025–26
- CAF Super Cup: 2023
