= Mohamed Ait El Hadj =

Algerian footballer (born 2002)

Personal information
- Date of birth: 22 March 2002 (age 24)
- Place of birth: Beni Messous, Algeria
- Position: Winger

Team information
- Current team: Paradou AC
- Number: 9

Youth career
- –2021: USM Alger

Senior career*
Years	Team	Apps	(Gls)
2021–2025	USM Alger	49	(4)
2025–	Paradou AC	42	(1)

International career
2022	Algeria U23	0	(0)
2022–	Algeria A'	3	(0)
- * Club domestic league appearances and goals as of 5 June 2026

Mohamed Ait El Hadj (Arabic: محمد آيت الحاج; born 22 March 2002) is an Algerian professional footballer who plays for Paradou AC in the Algerian Ligue Professionnelle 1.

== Career ==
=== USM Alger ===
On 16 January 2022, Mohamed Ait El Hadj made his first league appearance with USM Alger against MC Alger. Aït El Hadj was going to be free in the summer 2022, because his old contract was to expire on 7 July 2022, making it necessary for him to extend it as soon as possible, at the risk of seeing him join another club. Aït El Hadj and Abderraouf Othmani represent the future of the club, and it is therefore logical that they have been extended underlined the Usmist management. On 1 April, Ait El Hadj scored his first league goal against JS Kabylie. On 3 June 2023, Ait El Hadj won the first title in his football career by winning the 2022–23 CAF Confederation Cup after defeating Young Africans of Tanzania.

On 16 August 2023, Ait El Hadj renewed his contract for two seasons until 2026, although he was not in the plans of his coach Abdelhak Benchikha. On 15 September 2023, Ait El Hadj won the CAF Super Cup title after winning against Al Ahly, it is the second African title with USM Alger in three months. After a complicated season, Ait El Hadj having been patient for a long time ended up demanding his release. Ait El Hadj rejected the idea of loaning him to another club and insisted on changing his direction, and chose another club that would give him the opportunity to play regularly. Ait El Hadj accompanied by his agent, conducted an interview with the club's sporting director Taoufik Korichi who convinced him to stay. On 30 January 2025, Mohamed Ait El Hadj terminated his contract with USM Alger and obtained his documents after he rejected the idea of loaning him to another club.

=== Paradou AC ===
On 5 February 2025, Ait El Hadj joined Paradou AC.

== Career statistics ==
=== Club ===
As of 24 January 2025

Appearances and goals by club, season and competition
Club	Season	League			Cup		Continental		Other		Total	
Club	Season	Division	Apps	Goals	Apps	Goals	Apps	Goals	Apps	Goals	Apps	Goals
USM Alger	2021–22	Ligue 1	12	2	—		—		—		12	2
USM Alger	2022–23	Ligue 1	20	1	1	0	6 (Note: All appearance(s) in CAF Confederation Cup)	0	—		27	1
USM Alger	2023–24	Ligue 1	12	1	0	0	5	0	—		17	1
USM Alger	2024–25	Ligue 1	5	0	—		2	0	—		7	0
USM Alger	Total		49	4	1	0	13	0	—		63	4
Career total			49	4	1	0	13	0	—		63	4

== International career ==
In December 2022, Mohamed Ait El Hadj was called up by Madjid Bougherra for the first time to the Algeria A' National Team for a week-long training camp in Algiers. On 2 January 2023, Ait El Hadj was selected for the 28-man squad to participate in the 2022 African Nations Championship. Where he played one match in the semi-finals and reached the final, where they lost the title against Senegal.

== Honours ==
USM Alger

- CAF Confederation Cup: 2022–23
- CAF Super Cup: 2023
