= Mohamed Amine Bouziane =

Algerian footballer (born 1996)

Personal information
- Date of birth: 5 February 1996 (age 30)
- Place of birth: Tiaret, Algeria
- Height: 1.69 m (5 ft 7 in)
- Position: Winger

Team information
- Current team: Paradou AC
- Number: 25

Senior career*
Years	Team	Apps	(Gls)
2017–2018	ESM Koléa		
2018–2019	CR Béni Thour		
2019–2020	RC Arbaâ	20	(3)
2020–2021	NA Hussein Dey	26	(1)
2021–2022	RC Arbaâ	30	(2)
2022–2023	US Monastir	26	(5)
2023–2024	USM Alger	13	(2)
2024–2025	US Biskra	15	(1)
2025–2026	CR Témouchent		
2026–	Paradou AC		
- * Club domestic league appearances and goals as of 11 September 2026

Mohamed Amine Bouziane (Arabic: محمد أمين بوزيان; born 5 February 1996) is an Algerian professional footballer who currently play for Paradou AC.

== Career ==
In 2022, Bouziane joined Tunisian club US Monastir. In 2023, Bouziane joined USM Alger.
