= Farid Zemiti =

Algerian football manager (born 1961)

Personal information
- Date of birth: 4 January 1961 (age 65)

Senior career*
Years	Team	Apps	(Gls)
- NA Hussein Dey

Managerial career
- 2007–2008: NA Hussein Dey
- 2008–2009: JSM Chéraga
- 2012–2013: MC Alger (assistant)
- 2013: MC Alger
- 2013–2015: USMM Hadjout
- 2017: RC Arbaâ
- 2017: USM Blida
- 2018: USM El Harrach
- 2019–2020: USM Alger (assistant)
- 2020: USM Alger
- 2020: USM Alger (assistant)
- 2022–2023: USM Alger (assistant)
- 2023–2024: Simba S.C. (assistant)
- 2024–2025: JS Kabylie (assistant)
- * Club domestic league appearances and goals

Farid Zemiti (born 4 January 1961) is an Algerian football manager.
