= Kheireddine Toual =

Algerian professional footballer (born 2001)

Personal information
- Full name: Kheireddine Toual
- Date of birth: 4 August 2001 (age 25)
- Place of birth: Messaâd, Algeria
- Position: Midfielder

Team information
- Current team: Al Masry SC
- Number: 20

Youth career
- –2022: RC Arbaâ

Senior career*
Years	Team	Apps	(Gls)
2022–2023	RC Arbaâ	18	(1)
2023–2025	USM Alger	3	(0)
2024	→ ES Ben Aknoun (loan)	14	(2)
2024–2025	→ MC El Bayadh (loan)	16	(1)
2025–2026	ES Sétif	28	(3)
2026-	Al Masry SC	1	(0)
- * Club domestic league appearances and goals as of 26 August 2026

Kheireddine Toual (Arabic: خير الدين طوال; born 4 August 2001) is an Algerian footballer who plays for Al Masry SC.

== Career ==
In 2023, Toual joined USM Alger. On 5 February 2024, he signed six-month loan contract with ES Ben Aknoun. In July 2025, Toual joined ES Sétif. On 2 August 2026, he joined Egyptian club Al Masry SC.
