= Omar Embarek =

Algerian footballer (born 1998)

Personal information
- Date of birth: 11 November 1998 (age 28)
- Place of birth: Chettia, Algeria
- Height: 1.66 m (5 ft 5 in)
- Position: Defensive midfielder

Team information
- Current team: MC Oran
- Number: 6

Youth career
- –2020: ASO Chlef

Senior career*
Years	Team	Apps	(Gls)
2020–2022	SC Aïn Defla		
2022–2023	MC El Bayadh	26	(0)
2023–2025	USM Alger	35	(0)
2024–2025	→ ES Mostaganem (loan)	13	(0)
2025–	MC Oran	26	(0)
- * Club domestic league appearances and goals as of 6 June 2025

Omar Embarek (Arabic: عمر مبارك; born 11 November 1998) is an Algerian professional footballer who plays for MC Oran in the Algerian Ligue Professionnelle 1.

== Career ==
In 2023, Embarek joined USM Alger. On 3 February 2025, he signed six-month loan contract with ES Mostaganem. On 17 August 2025, Embarek joined MC Oran.

== Honours ==
USM Alger

- CAF Super Cup: 2023
