= Paradou AC =

Algerian football club

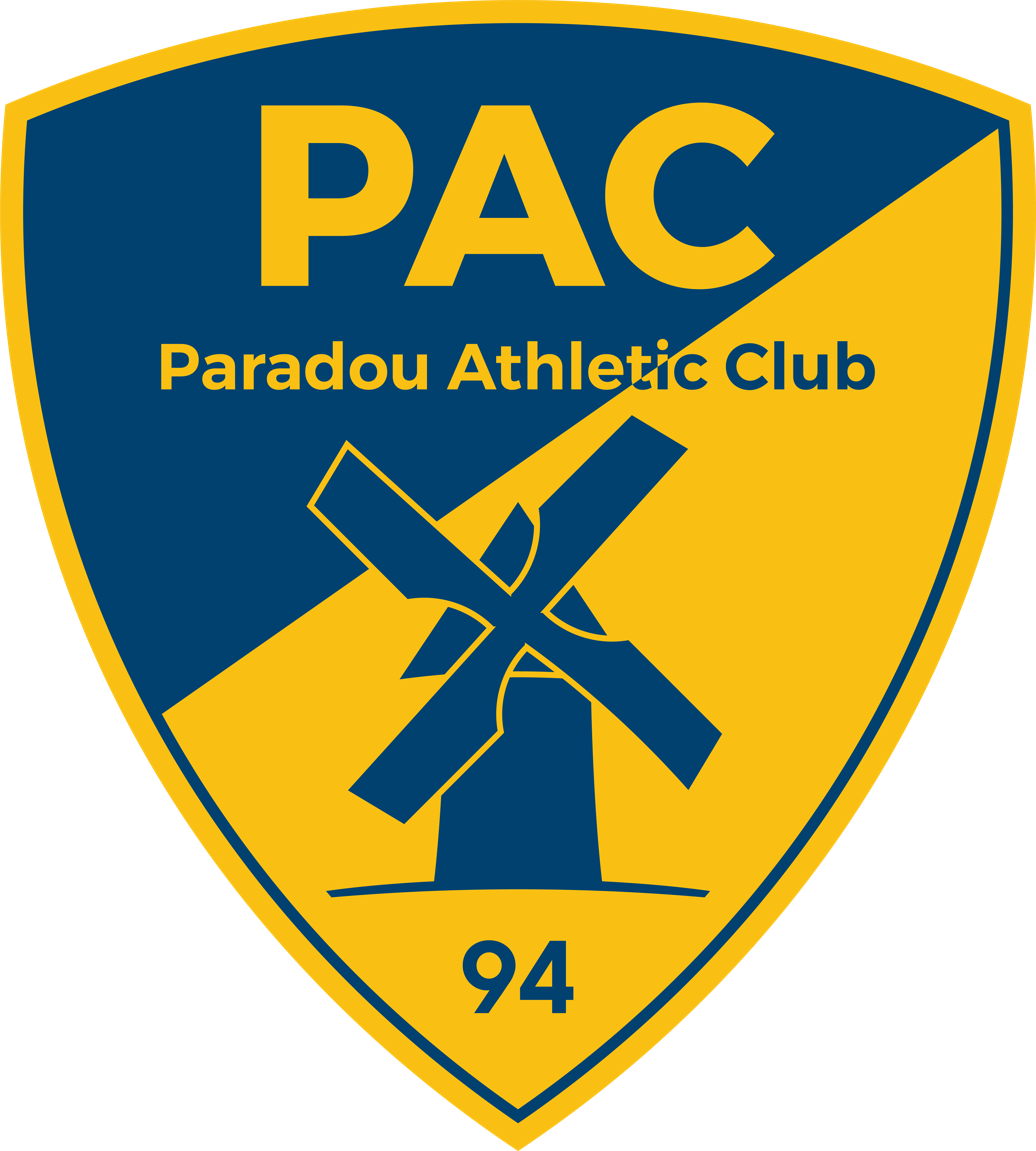
- Full name: Paradou Athletic Club
- Founded: 16 August 1994; 32 years ago
- Ground: Omar Benrabah Stadium
- Capacity: 14,150
- President: Hacène Zetchi
- Head Coach: Amar Guerbi
- League: League 2
- 2025–26: Ligue 1, 14th of 16 (relegated)
Home colours	Away colours	Third colours

Paradou Athletic Club (Arabic: نادي أتليتيك بارادو), known as Paradou AC or simply PAC for short, is an Algerian football club based in Algiers. The club was founded in 1994 by members of the Hydra AC junior team, the club colours are blue and yellow. Their home stadium, Ahmed Fellak Stadium, has a capacity of some 5,000 spectators but the club receives its opponents in Omar Benrabah Stadium. The club is currently playing in the Algerian League 2.

In May 2017, Paradou AC returned to the Algerian Ligue Professionnelle 1 after a 10 years absence.

== History ==
The idea of establishing the Paradou Athletic Club (PAC) emerged from a group of friends who wanted to create a space where young people could meet and participate in recreational activities, particularly after their school studies. After several discussions and proposals, the group decided to establish a football club and chose the name Paradou Athletic Club, commonly abbreviated as PAC. The club's colours, yellow and blue, were reportedly chosen in an anecdotal manner. Several colour combinations had been proposed without reaching consensus. During one of the discussions, the founders noticed the Swedish ambassador passing by in a vehicle displaying the Swedish flag, which inspired them to adopt its colours.

A first meeting of the founding members was held at the Colomba restaurant. Those present included Mahi Ali, Mahi Mohamed, Kabla Kamel, Kabla Rezki, Kheiredine Zetchi, Oudghiri Ahmed, Mahi Abdelfettah, Zetchi Hassen, Kabla Toufik, Hammouche Abdennour, Chitour Omar, Oudghiri Rafik, Guecem Kamel and Bouhellal Kamel. Several other individuals who contributed to the creation of the club also participated in the meeting. The club's first sporting campaign began in September 1994 with a Wilaya Cup match at the Ben Aknoun Stadium, where Paradou AC recorded a 3–2 victory. The club subsequently completed the administrative procedures required for official recognition. Its approval document was issued on 16 August 1994 under number 359. Following its approval, the club's management established senior and youth teams and made player development one of its principal objectives.

From its first competitive season in 1994–95, Paradou AC progressed through the Algerian football pyramid. The club eventually reached the top division, Ligue 1, in 2005. After three seasons in the Division Nationale Amateur (DNA), Paradou AC returned to the professional ranks in Ligue 2, before establishing itself among Algeria's leading clubs. The club's youth-development programme also produced several players who went on to play for other prominent Algerian clubs, including Lamouri Djediat, Mokhtar Benmoussa, Hocine El Orfi, Saad Tedjar, Billel Ouali and Hichem Nekkache.

On 21 May 2026, Paradou AC were relegated to Algerian League 2 after 9 years in the top division.

== Honours ==
=== Domestic competitions ===
- Algerian Ligue Professionnelle 2
  - Champion (1): 2016–17

== Players ==
Algerian teams are limited to four foreign players. The squad list includes only the principal nationality of each player;

=== Current squad ===
As of 14 September 2026 Note: Flags indicate national team as defined under FIFA eligibility rules; some limited exceptions apply. Players may hold more than one non-FIFA nationality.

No.	Pos.	Nation	Player
1	GK	ALG	Fouad Zegrar
2	FW	ALG	Abderrahmane Bacha
3	DF	ALG	Mohamed Bouderka
4	DF	ALG	Mohamed Youcef Hamed
5	DF	ALG	Ouanisse Bouzahzah
6	MF	ALG	Malik Kahlouchi
7	FW	ALG	Mohamed Guidoum
8	MF	ALG	Mohamed Lamine Tahar
9	FW	ALG	Mohamed Ait El Hadj
10	MF	ALG	Youcef Belkaid
11	MF	ALG	Djafar Zabaiou
12	DF	ALG	Salaheddine Zaoui
13	FW	ALG	Aymen Chegra
14	DF	ALG	Younes Badani

No.	Pos.	Nation	Player
16	GK	ALG	Bachir Della Krachai
17	MF	ALG	Moncef Bisker
18	MF	ALG	Abdeldjalil Tahri
19	DF	ALG	Abderrazak Senouci
20	MF	ALG	Sid Ahmed Lahmer
22	DF	ALG	Chameseddine Redouani
23	DF	ALG	Ibrahim Ferhat
24	DF	ALG	Ahmed Bayoud
25	FW	ALG	Mohamed Amine Bouziane
26	DF	ALG	Mohamed Mekacher
27	DF	ALG	Oussama Barkat
28	FW	ALG	Abdelali Nedjah
29	DF	ALG	Rayan Ferhat
60	GK	ALG	Mohammed El Koubi

== Personnel ==
=== Current technical staff ===
Position	Staff
Head coach	(Algeria) Amar Guerbi
Assistant coach	(Algeria) Anis Zoubar
Goalkeeping coach	(Algeria) Kouçaï Benmakhlouf
Fitness coach	

== Paradou AC/JMG "El Ankaoui" Academy ==
In 2007, Paradou AC launched their academy in a partnership with JMG Academy, run by Frenchman Jean-Marc Guillou. The cost of the academy is estimated to be about €600 000 over 7 years, including the purchase of land at a site in Tessala El Merdja (in the outskirts of Alger), and construction of housing and facilities for the players and staff. The current team is made up of players aged 13 to 15 years old, and they have regularly beaten much older teams, while playing without shoes or a goalie. The team is coached by Olivier Guillou and Djamel Aïch.

== Players from Paradou AC to Europe ==
Player	Pos	Club	League	Transfer fee	Source
(Algeria) Hicham Boudaoui	MF	Nice	(France) Ligue 1	€4,000,000	
(Algeria) Youcef Atal	DF	KV Kortrijk	(Belgium) Belgian First Division A	€550,000	
(Algeria) Farid El Mellali	FW	Angers	(France) Ligue 1	Free transfer	
(Algeria) Ramy Bensebaini	DF	Rennes	(France) Ligue 1	€2,000,000	
(Algeria) Adem Zorgane	MF	Charleroi	(Belgium) Belgian First Division A	€1,000,000	
(Algeria) Abdelkahar Kadri	MF	Kortrijk	(Belgium) Belgian First Division A	€500,000	
(Algeria) Ahmed Nadhir Benbouali	FW	Charleroi	(Belgium) Belgian First Division A	€750,000	
(Algeria) Yassine Titraoui	MF	Charleroi	(Belgium) Belgian First Division A	€1,200,000	

== Players from Paradou AC to other countries ==
Player	Pos	Club	League	Transfer fee	Source
(Algeria) Raouf Benguit	MF	Espérance ST	(Tunisia) Ligue Professionnelle 1	742,000 $	

== List of Paradou AC international footballers ==
=== Players ===
Key
†	Players participated in the African Cup of Nations
GK	Goalkeeper
DF	Defender
MF	Midfielder
FW	Forward
Bold	Still playing competitive football

Paradou AC international footballers
Name	Position	Date of first cap	Debut against	Date of last cap	Final match against	Caps	Ref
(Algeria) **Youcef Atal**	DF	6 Jun 2017	Guinea	11 Jun 2017	Togo	2	
(Algeria) **Hicham Boudaoui**	MF	27 Dec 2018	Qatar	7 Jul 2019	Guinea	5	
(Algeria) **Farid El Melali**	FW	22 Mar 2018	Tanzania	27 Mar 2018	Iran	2	
(Uganda) **Allan Okello**	FW	16 Nov 2020	South Sudan	14 Nov 2021	Mali	6	
(Algeria) **Haithem Loucif**	DF	27 Dec 2018	Qatar	22 Mar 2019	Gambia	2	
(Algeria) **Zakaria Naidji**	FW	22 Mar 2019	Gambia	22 Mar 2019	Gambia	1	
