= 2023 CAF Super Cup =

TotalEnergies CAF Super Cup 2023
- Match programme cover
Al Ahly	USM Alger
(Egypt)	(Algeria)
0	1
- Date: 15 September 2023
- Venue: King Fahd Stadium, Taif, Saudi Arabia
- Man of the Match: Aliou Dieng (Al Ahly)
- Referee: Pierre Atcho (Gabon)
- Attendance: 10,000
- Weather: Partly cloudy 28 °C (82 °F); 33% humidity

The 2023 CAF Super Cup, known as the TotalEnergies CAF Super Cup 2023 for sponsorship reasons, was the 32nd CAF Super Cup, an annual football match in Africa organized by the Confederation of African Football (CAF), between the winners of the previous season's two CAF club competitions, the CAF Champions League and the CAF Confederation Cup.

On 26 August, the Confederation of African Football (CAF) has communicated the date of the course of CAF Super Cup final. This match took place on September 15 at the King Fahd Stadium in Taif, Saudi Arabia.

The match was played between the 2022–23 CAF Champions League winners, and the 2022–23 CAF Confederation Cup winners.

USM Alger won their first title CAF Super Cup after defeating Al Ahly, which is considered a shock victory, and becoming the second Algerian team to win this title.

== Teams ==
Team	Zone	Qualification	Previous participation (bold indicates winners)
(Egypt) Al Ahly	UNAF (North Africa)	2022–23 CAF Champions League winners	10 (1994, **2002**, **2006**, **2007**, **2009**, **2013**, **2014**, 2015, **2021 (May)**, **2021 (December)**)
(Algeria) USM Alger	UNAF (North Africa)	2022–23 CAF Confederation Cup winners	None

== Format ==
The CAF Super Cup was played as a single match at a neutral venue, with the CAF Champions League winners designated as the "home" team for administrative purposes. If the score is tied at the end of regulation, extra time was not played, and the penalty shoot-out was used to determine the winner (CAF Champions League Regulations XXVII and CAF Confederation Cup Regulations XXV).

== Venue ==
Location of the host city of the 2023 CAF Super Cup.	City	Stadium
Location of the host city of the 2023 CAF Super Cup.	Taif	King Fahd Stadium
Location of the host city of the 2023 CAF Super Cup.	**Capacity: 20,000**	

== Match ==
15 September 2023
21:00 UTC+3

Al Ahly (Egypt)	0–1	(Algeria) USM Alger
	Report	Belaïd 43' (pen.)

King Fahd Stadium, Taif (Saudi Arabia)
Attendance: 10,000
Referee: Pierre Atcho (Gabon)

**Al Ahly**	**USM Alger**

GK	1	(Egypt) Mohamed El Shenawy (c)
DF	21	(Tunisia) Ali Maâloul
DF	5	(Egypt) Ramy Rabia
DF	30	(Egypt) Mohamed Hany
DF	24	(Egypt) Mohamed Abdel Monem
MF	15	(Mali) Aliou Dieng
MF	14	(Egypt) Hussein El Shahat	(substituted off) 79'
MF	22	(Egypt) Emam Ashour	(substituted off) 79'
MF	13	(Egypt) Marwan Attia	(substituted off) 64'
FW	7	(Egypt) Kahraba	(yellow card) 26'	(substituted off) 79'
FW	12	(Morocco) Reda Slim	(substituted off) 64'
Substitutes:
GK	31	(Egypt) Mostafa Shobeir
DF	6	(Egypt) Yasser Ibrahim	(substituted on) 85'
DF	33	(Egypt) Karim El Debes
MF	19	(Egypt) Mohamed Magdy	(substituted on) 79'
FW	9	(Egypt) Salah Mohsen	(yellow card) 90+4'	(substituted on) 64'
FW	23	(South Africa) Percy Tau	(substituted on) 64'
FW	27	(Egypt) Taher Mohamed	(substituted on) 79'
Manager:
(Switzerland) Marcel Koller

GK	25	(Algeria) Oussama Benbot	(yellow card) 90+9'
DF	19	(Algeria) Saâdi Radouani
DF	15	(Algeria) Nabil Lamara	(yellow card) 90+2'
DF	4	(Algeria) Zineddine Belaïd (c)
DF	21	(Algeria) Adam Alilet	(yellow card) 90+6'
MF	6	(Algeria) Oussama Chita	(substituted off) 67'
MF	14	(Algeria) Brahim Benzaza	(substituted off) 84'
MF	27	(Algeria) Nour El Islam Fettouhi	(yellow card) 38'	(substituted off) 67'
FW	23	(Algeria) Khaled Bousseliou	(substituted off) 83'
FW	18	(Botswana) Tumisang Orebonye
FW	7	(Algeria) Ismail Belkacemi	(substituted off) 79'
Substitutes:
GK	16	(Algeria) Kamel Soufi
DF	20	(Algeria) Hocine Dehiri
MF	8	(Algeria) Islam Merili	(substituted on) 79'
MF	10	(Mali) Sékou Konaté	(substituted on) 83'
MF	13	(Algeria) Omar Mbarek	(yellow card) 70'	(substituted on) 67'
MF	24	(Algeria) Taher Benkhelifa	(substituted on) 84'
FW	9	(Mali) Abdoulaye Kanou	(substituted on) 67'
Manager:
(Algeria) Abdelhak Benchikha

Assistant referees:
Boris Ditsougo (Gabon)
Karin Atizamboungou Fomo (Cameroon)
Fourth official:
Issa Sy (Senegal)
Video assistant referee:
Maria Rivet (Mauritania)
Assistant video assistant referees:
Adel Zourak (Morocco)

**Match rules**
- 90 minutes.
- Penalty shoot-out if scores level.
- Nine named substitutes, of which up to five may be used. (Note: Each team was only given three opportunities to make substitutions, excluding substitutions made at half-time.)

=== Statistics ===
First half
Statistic	Al Ahly	USM Alger
Goals scored	0	1
Total shots	5	5
Shots on target	4	4
Saves	0	0
Ball possession	57.6%	42.4%
Corner kicks	6	0
Offsides	1	0
Yellow cards	1	1
Red cards	0	0

Second half
Statistic	Al Ahly	USM Alger
Goals scored	0	0
Total shots	7	2
Shots on target	1	1
Saves	0	0
Ball possession	69.8%	30.2%
Corner kicks	5	0
Offsides	1	1
Yellow cards	1	4
Red cards	0	0

Overall
Statistic	Al Ahly	USM Alger
Goals scored	0	1
Total shots	12	7
Shots on target	5	5
Saves	0	0
Ball possession	63.9%	36.1%
Corner kicks	11	0
Offsides	2	1
Yellow cards	2	5
Red cards	0	0
