= 2026 Algerian Cup final =

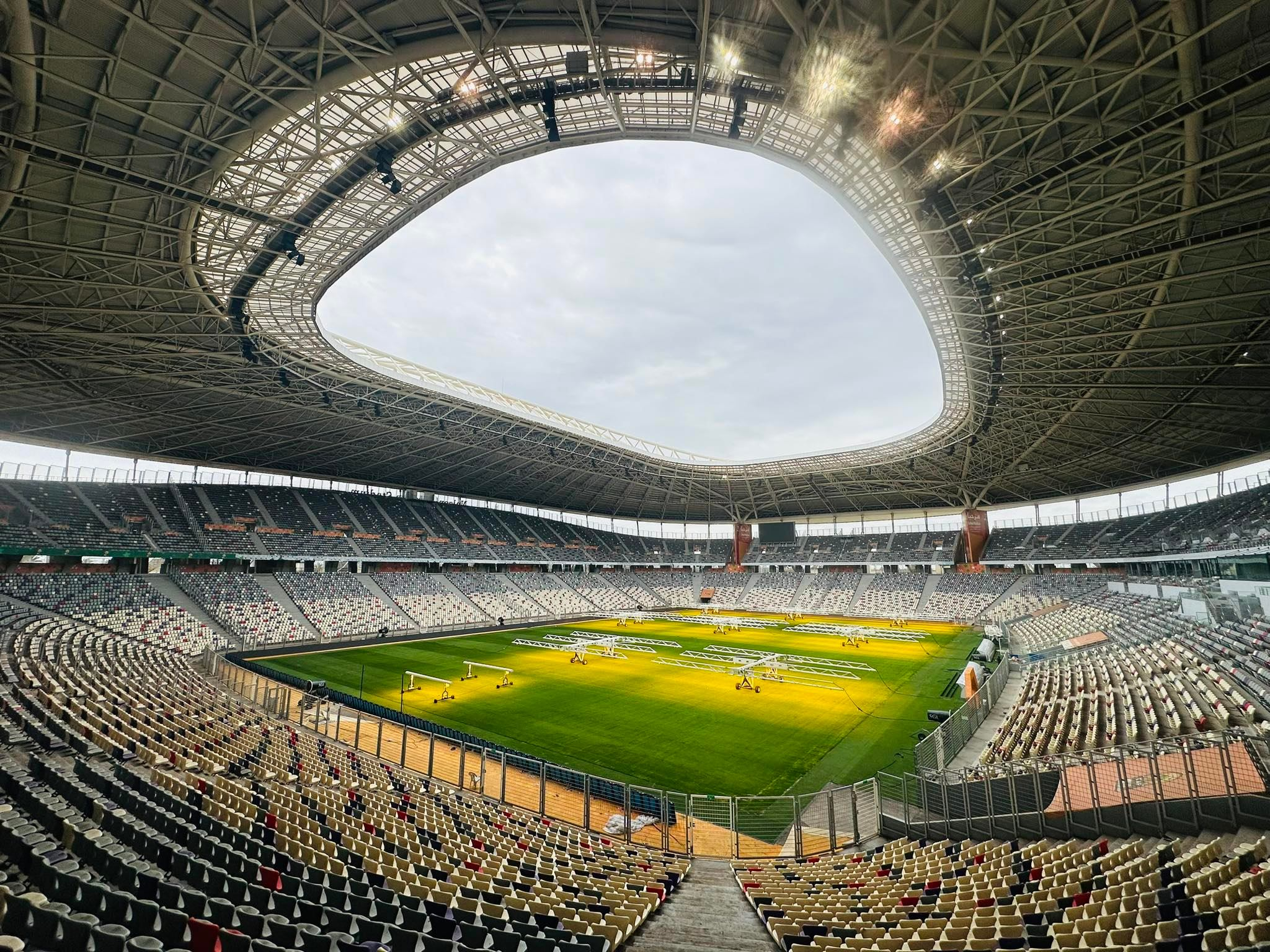
- Nelson Mandela Stadium hosted the final
- Event: 2025–26 Algerian Cup
USM Alger	CR Belouizdad
2	1
- Date: 30 April 2026
- Venue: Nelson Mandela Stadium, Baraki
- Referee: Akram Mechairia
- Attendance: 25,000
- Weather: Generally cloudy 69 °F (21 °C); 80% humidity

The 2026 Algerian Cup final was the 59th final of the Algerian Cup. The match was played on 30 April 2026 at the Nelson Mandela Stadium in Baraki. The featured USM Alger, the defending champions, and CR Belouizdad. It was the seventh and second consecutive final that feature them. USM Alger won the match 2-1, resulting in the club winning their tenth trophy. As winners, they earned the right to play against MC Alger, the champions of the 2025–26 Algerian Ligue Professionnelle 1, in the 2026 Algerian Super Cup.

== Route to the final ==
=== USM Alger ===
USM Alger's route to the final
Round	Opposition	Score
R64	NC Magra (A)	0–0 (a.e.t.) (4–5 p)
R32	MO Constantine (H)	3–0
R16	USM El Harrach (A)	2–3
QF	JS Saoura (H)	1–0
SF	CA Batna (A)	1–3 (a.e.t.)
Key: (H) = Home venue; (A) = Away venue

USM Alger secured qualification for the Round of 32 of the Algerian Cup with difficulty after defeating NC Magra on penalties (0–0, 5–4). Following a dull and low-tempo match, neither side managed to score in regular or extra time. The penalty shootout ultimately favored the Usmistes despite an underwhelming performance. The main objective was achieved, as USMA continued the defense of its title.

USMA then advanced comfortably to the Round of 16 with a 3–0 win over MO Constantine. The match was marked by the early sending-off of Boumeziane within the first 15 minutes. Playing with a numerical advantage for over 75 minutes, the Red and Black quickly took control, opening the scoring through Houssam Ghacha in the 19th minute. After a solid first half, Ghacha shone again in the second half, adding two more goals (59’, 79’) to complete a hat-trick.

In the Round of 16, USMA qualified for the quarter-finals after beating USM El Harrach (3–2) after extra time in a heated Algiers derby. The match was highly competitive, especially in midfield. USMA opened the scoring through Loucif following a move initiated by Ghacha. The latter was also involved in the second goal, scored by Likonza. In extra time, Ghacha sealed the victory with a decisive third goal, sending USMA through.

USMA reached the semi-finals after a 1–0 win against JS Saoura. The only goal came in the 35th minute, scored by Radouani from a corner taken by Ghacha and flicked on by Dehiri. After a balanced first half, USMA gradually took control of the match, creating several chances in the second half through Dehiri and Benayad. However, goalkeeper Salhi prevented a second goal, while JS Saoura struggled to create real danger.

On April 24, 2026, USMA booked their place in the final after defeating CA Batna (3–1 after extra time). The Usmistes made a strong start, opening the scoring through Tendeng in the 12th minute, before CA Batna equalized just before halftime via Guettout. The second half remained intense and physical, with no winner emerging. In extra time, Bouderbala turned the game around with a decisive brace, securing a deserved victory and sending USMA into the final with the ambition of winning their 10th Algerian Cup title.

=== CR Belouizdad ===
CR Belouizdad's route to the final
Round	Opposition	Score
R64	ORB Oued Fodda (H)	2–1 (a.e.t.)
R32	WB Aïn Benian (A)	1–5
R16	ASM Oran (H)	3–0
QF	MC Alger (H)	3–2 (a.e.t.)
SF	CS Constantine (A)	2–3
Key: (H) = Home venue; (A) = Away venue

On December 3, 2025, CR Belouizdad secured a hard-fought qualification for the Algerian Cup round of 32, defeating Oued Fodda 2–1 after extra time. After conceding early, they equalized through Bekkour and dominated the game but lacked efficiency in front of goal. Meziane eventually scored the winner in extra time, capping off a difficult match and an overall unconvincing performance.

On 15 December 2025, CR Belouizdad cruised into the Algerian Cup round of 16 with a dominant 5–1 win over WB Aïn Benian. After controlling the first half, Benguit opened the scoring before Keddad doubled the lead just before the break. WB Aïn Benian pulled one back in the second half, but Boussouar came off the bench and stole the show with a hat-trick, sealing an emphatic victory.

On 3 March 2026, in the quarter-finals, CR Belouizdad defeated MC Alger 3–2 after extra time to qualify for the semi-finals in a highly tense and closely contested match. The scoring was opened by Mohamed Ali Ben Hammouda in the 17th minute, before Ayoub Ghezala equalised for MC Alger in the 29th minute from the penalty spot. CR Belouizdad regained the lead shortly after half-time through Naoufel Khacef (46’), but Bangoura levelled the match again in the 90th minute, sending the game into extra time. In the extra period, Laouafi scored the decisive goal in the 100th minute, securing qualification for CR Belouizdad.

In the semi-final, CR Belouizdad delivered a commanding performance to defeat CS Constantine 3–2 away in Constantine and secure qualification for the final. CRB opened the scoring through Abdennour Belhocini in the 18th minute, but CSC equalised via Brahim Dib shortly after the break (55’). Ben Hammouda then restored the advantage for CR Belouizdad with two decisive goals (59’ and 70’), putting his side in control of the encounter. CS Constantine reduced the gap deep into stoppage time through Omoyele (90’+4), but it came too late to change the outcome, as CR Belouizdad held on to secure qualification for the final. The result allowed CR Belouizdad to reach the final of the competition, marking their 15th appearance in the Algerian Cup final. It also extended their remarkable consistency in the tournament, as they qualified for a fifth consecutive final (2019, 2023, 2024, 2025, and 2026), equalling a long-standing record previously held by USM Alger.

== Pre-match ==
The 2025–26 Algerian Cup final was the seventh and second consecutive final that featured USM Alger and CR Belouizdad. Each team won three titles, with USM Alger winning the last final. USM Alger wanted to confirm last year's victory while CR Belouizdad wanted to take their revenge.

=== Broadcasting ===
Algerian Television held the broadcasting rights for the final match on its channels, TV1 (Arabic), TV2 (French), TV4 (Tamazight), and TV6. As for radio, the match will be broadcast on Radio 1, Radio 2, and Radio 3. Qatari channels Alkass Sports and Egyptian channel Nile Sports also broadcast the final.

=== Match officials ===
On 29 April 2026, The Federal Arbitration Commission of the (FAF) named Akram Mechairia as the referee for the final, including assistant referees Mokrane Gourari and Mohamed Ghozlane. Alaa Bouab served as the fourth official, Lamine Chellali will serve as the reserve assistant referee. while Youcef Taieb-Bouderbal acted as the Video assistant referee. Mohamed Rezga were appointed as assistant VAR officials.

== Match ==
=== Summary ===
USM Alger continued to assert its dominance on the national stage by winning the 2025–26 Algerian Cup, defeating arch-rivals CR Belouizdad 2–1. With this victory, the club secured a record 10th Algerian Cup title an historic first. The match began in favor of CR Belouizdad, who looked sharper and more dangerous early on. Meziane tested goalkeeper Oussama Benbot with a decisive save in the opening minutes, but despite their strong start, the Chabab failed to convert their dominance into goals against a well organized USMA defense. Gradually, USM Alger took control and made their efficiency count. In the 22nd minute, Dramane Kamagaté opened the scoring with a precise finish after a well delivered assist from Ahmed Khaldi. CRB attempted to respond but struggled to break down a disciplined defensive block. Just before halftime, USMA doubled their lead. Brahim Benzaza set up Khaldi, who calmly finished in the 43rd minute, capitalizing on defensive lapses to give his side a crucial advantage.

The second half saw a shift in momentum, with CR Belouizdad raising the tempo and pushing forward. The introduction of Bilal Boukerchaoui added attacking impetus, and their pressure paid off in the 62nd minute when Younes Ouassa headed home from an Raouf Benguit free kick to reduce the deficit. The final minutes were dominated by CRB, but USMA held firm defensively to preserve their lead until the final whistle from referee Akram Mechaïria. This victory confirms USM Alger’s superiority in this Algiers derby. The two sides had been level before this seventh final meeting, but USMA now takes the lead with a fourth win over CR Belouizdad, becoming the most successful club in Algerian Cup history with 10 titles. Meanwhile, CR Belouizdad remains on nine trophies despite reaching a fifth consecutive final.

=== Details ===
30 April 2026
17:00

USM Alger	2–1	CR Belouizdad
Kamagaté 22'; Khaldi 44'	Report	Ouassa 62'

Nelson Mandela Stadium, Baraki
Attendance: 25,000
Referee: Akram Mechairia

USM Alger	CR Belouizdad

GK	25	(Algeria) Oussama Benbot
CB	5	(Algeria) Imadeddine Azzi
CB	28	(Algeria) Achref Abada
RB	19	(Algeria) Saâdi Radouani (c)
LB	13	(Algeria) Hocine Dehiri
DM	6	(Algeria) Zakaria Draoui
DM	14	(Algeria) Brahim Benzaza	(yellow card) 75'	(substituted off) 75'
AM	8	(Algeria) Islam Merili		(substituted off) 75'
AM	30	(Senegal) Aimé Tendeng		(substituted off) 75'
ST	7	(Algeria) Ahmed Khaldi		(substituted off) 84'
ST	29	(Ivory Coast) Dramane Kamagaté		(substituted off) 89'
Substitutes:
GK	16	(Algeria) Kamel Soufi
CB	3	(Algeria) Safieddine Atmania
CB	4	(Cameroon) Che Malone		(substituted on) 75'
RB	12	(Algeria) Haithem Loucif		(substituted on) 75'
RB	20	(Algeria) Rayane Mahrouz	(yellow card) 90+3'	(substituted on) 84'
LB	23	(Algeria) Ilyes Chetti
AM	11	(Democratic Republic of the Congo) Glody Likonza		(substituted on) 75'
RW	24	(Algeria) Mohamed Bouderbala		(substituted on) 89'
ST	9	(Algeria) Riad Benayad
Manager :
(Senegal) Lamine N'Diaye

GK	30	(Algeria) Farid Chaâl
CB	25	(Algeria) Younes Ouassa	(yellow card) 90+3'
CB	21	(Algeria) Youcef Laouafi
RB	3	(Algeria) Houcine Benayada
LB	24	(Algeria) Naoufel Khacef
DM	8	(Algeria) Raouf Benguit (c)		(substituted off) 79'
DM	18	(Algeria) Salim Boukhanchouche
CM	27	(Algeria) Djaber Kaâssis		(substituted off) 88'
LW	11	(Algeria) Abderrahmane Meziane		(substituted off) 88'
RW	22	(Algeria) Mohamed Islam Belkhir		(substituted off) 46'
ST	20	(Tunisia) Mohamed Ali Ben Hammouda
Substitutes:
GK	1	(Algeria) Tarek Bousseder
CB	4	(Algeria) Abderrahmane Bekkour
AM	5	(Algeria) Abdelmalek Kelaleche
CM	6	(Algeria) Necer Benzid		(substituted on) 88'
AM	10	(Ivory Coast) Jean Charles Ahoua
DM	29	(Algeria) Bilal Boukerchaoui		(substituted on) 46'
RW	17	(Algeria) Islam Abbaci
LW	28	(Algeria) Farid El Melali		(substituted on) 88'
ST	13	(Algeria) Lofti Boussouar		(substituted on) 79'
Manager :
(Algeria) Ishak Ali Moussa

Assistant referees:
Mokrane Gourari
Mohamed Ghozlane
Fourth official:
Alaa Bouab
Reserve referee:
Lamine Chellali
Video assistant referee:
Youcef Taieb-Bouderbal
Assistant video assistant referees:
Mohamed Rezga

Match rules
- 90 minutes
- 30 minutes of extra time if necessary
- Penalty shoot-out if scores still level
- Seven named substitutes
- Maximum of five substitutions, with a sixth allowed in extra time (Note: Each team was given only three opportunities to make substitutions, with a fourth opportunity in extra time, excluding substitutions made at half-time, before the start of extra time and at half-time in extra time.)
