= 2025–26 USM Alger season =

USM Alger
2025–26 season
- Owner: Groupe SERPORT
- President: Boubekeur Abid (until 25 December 2025); Bilel Nouioua (from 27 December 2025)
- Head coach: Abdelhak Benchikha (from 12 August 2025) (until 27 January 2026); Tarek Hadj Adlane (c) (from 27 January 2026) (until 20 February 2026); Lamine N'Diaye (from 20 February 2026)
- Stadium: Stade du 5 Juillet
- Ligue 1: 10th
- Algerian Cup: Winners
- Super Cup: Runners-up
- Confederation Cup: Winners
- Top goalscorer: League: Ahmed Khaldi (8 goals); All: Ahmed Khaldi (13 goals)
- Biggest win: USM Alger 3–0 MO Constantine
Home colours	Away colours	Third colours

The 2025–26 season, is USM Alger's 48th season and the club's 31st consecutive season in the top flight of Algerian football. In addition to the domestic league, USM Alger are participating in this season's editions of the Algerian Cup, the Super Cup and the Confederation Cup. The Algerian Professional Football League (LFP) officially released the calendar for the 2025–26 Ligue 1 Mobilis season on July 10, 2025. The Ligue 1 kick off on Thursday, August 21, 2025, and conclude with the 30th and final matchday on May 16, 2026. As in recent years, league matches will be held every Thursday, Friday, and Saturday, offering better scheduling balance and improved logistical conditions for clubs and broadcasters.

== Review ==
=== Background ===
On July 7, 2025, USM Alger officially announced the appointment of Lamine Kebir as the new directeur technique sportif (DTS) for the youth categories. He replaces Sofiane Benkhelifa and has signed a two-year contract. In its statement, the club recalled that Kebir is no stranger to USMA, having previously led the senior team to success, most notably winning the Ligue 1 title in 2019. His return is part of a new strategy focused on youth development, with a mission to lead the club's academy project and structure and supervise the youth setup.

The Board of Directors of USM Alger held a meeting on July 12, 2025, by Boubekeur Abid, to discuss several organizational matters. The board was reinforced with three new members, Fayçal Ouagnouni, Abdelhak Bousbia and Saïd Isoulah to support the club in the upcoming phase. The chairman was authorized to sign a cooperation agreement with the CETIC center to conduct a comprehensive organizational study, including the youth academy. He was also granted authority to sign the amateur club agreement for the 2025–26 season. The board presented a draft employment contract to Saïd Allik for the position of technical director. The proposed contract aligns with Allik's requests and current labor regulations and will be submitted to the owning company, Groupe SERPORT, for final approval.

On July 16, USM Alger has issued an official warning to Cosider and the AVMETAL engineering firm, responsible for building its training center. This decision follows several unresolved issues despite repeated notices. Key concerns include major delays, non compliant work, and lack of resources. There is also a near-total lack of coordination and ongoing tensions between stakeholders. The club has given a maximum deadline of 8 days to address the problems. If no action is taken, USMA will pursue all necessary legal measures.

Following instructions from Saïd Sayoud, Minister of Transport, regarding the management of USM Alger, a club affiliated with Groupe SERPORT, the club signed a contract on July 17, 2025, with Saïd Allik as Sporting General Manager. This appointment is part of a restructuring of the club's sporting management. Allik has authority over recruitment. This move is intended to organize the sporting sector according to the club's objectives.

On July 22, 2025, Algeria A' national team coach Madjid Bougherra revealed the 26-player list for the 2025 African Nations Championship (CHAN), set to take place this summer in East Africa. Among the selected players, five players from USM Alger have made the squad, highlighting the club's strong representation in the national team. The players are: Saâdi Radouani, Adam Alilet, Ilyes Chetti, Zakaria Draoui, Mehdi Merghem and Diaa Eddine Mechid.

On July 26, 2025, USM Alger's management condemned the spread of false information on social media, falsely presented as official club statements. The club criticized the use of an old logo, legally banned by court ruling, in these fake posts. Such actions are deemed harmful and illegal, undermining the team's efforts. The club emphasized that it continues to work calmly and professionally to build a strong squad. Supporters are urged to rely only on official club sources for accurate information. Legal action may be taken against those who damage the club's image or visual identity.

After two weeks of rest, USM Alger resumed training on July 20 in Algiers, with a first phase of preparation that included a training camp at the Dar Diaf hotel. In the absence of a head coach, it was physical trainer Modjahed Belaid who led the sessions, despite the absence of several A’ international players. Starting August 4, 2025, the team enters the most crucial stage of the preseason: a twelve-day training camp in Tabarka, Tunisia, running until August 16. This phase will be mainly focused on technical and tactical work, as the club continues to await the appointment of a new head coach.

Less than two weeks before their opening clash against JS Kabylie, USM Alger still have no head coach. The Algerian Cup holders are currently in training camp in Tunisia under the temporary supervision of fitness coach Belaid Medjahed. Since returning to power, Saïd Allik has been searching for a high-profile manager to succeed Mohamed Lacet, who had stepped in after the departure of Marcos Paquetá. Talks with Senegal's Aliou Cissé, currently in charge of Libya's national team, quickly ended after he declined the offer. A comeback for Spaniard Juan Carlos Garrido was considered but failed to win over the fans. According to journalist Samir Lamari, Malian coach Éric Chelle, free since leaving MC Oran before taking charge of Nigeria's national side, is now being mentioned. USMA are racing against the clock to appoint a coach before the start of the 2025–2026 season.

On August 12, 2025, USM Alger officially announced the appointment of Abdelhak Benchikha as head coach for a one-year term. He succeeds Mohamed Lacet, whose contract was not renewed. Benchikha is making his return to the “Red and Black” bench, having already led the team in 2023 to a historic double: the CAF Confederation Cup and the CAF Super Cup, won against Egypt's Al Ahly. « Benchikha is one of the iconic figures in the club's history, having guided our team to great success. We welcome him back to the Union family and wish him every success in leading the team to further titles »,” read USMA's statement. USM Alger's officially announced, on August 20, the appointment of Arezki Remmane as the assistant coach of the first team. In its statement, the club explained that this decision is part of strengthening the technical staff in preparation for the upcoming sporting season.

==== First-team transfers (summer transfer window) ====
USM Alger has kicked off its 2025–26 summer transfer window with the departure of the Congolese international defender Kévin Mondeko on July 8, 2025. The club officially announced on July 8, 2025, that it had mutually agreed to terminate the player's contract, just one season after his arrival from TP Mazembe. This move marks the first concrete step in the expected squad reshuffle. On the same day, USM Alger announced the departure of Oussama Chita after eight years at the club. He played 197 matches and won four titles. The club praised his discipline, fighting spirit, and loyalty. Chita was among the few players to remain at the club for several consecutive seasons. His farewell comes just days after winning the Algerian Cup with USMA.

On July 10, 2025, USM Alger thanks Adalid Terrazas following his transfer to San Antonio Bulo Bulo. The Bolivian midfielder spent one season with the club, showing professionalism and commitment. Though he did not play in the Algerian Cup final, he was part of the squad that won the trophy. “USM Alger values the efforts and attitude of Adalid Terrazas during his time with the club. We thank him for his dedication and wish him the best of luck in the rest of his professional career.” Imadeddine Azzi will no longer wear USMA's colors. After a one-season loan crowned with an Algerian Cup title, Kazma of Kuwait rejected USMA's offer of $300,000. Eventually, Russian club FC Dynamo Makhachkala sealed the deal by paying the $500,000 release clause. The defender now moves to Russia, bringing his chapter with the Reds and Blacks to a close.

On July 29, 2025, USM Alger officially presented their new signing, Che Malone, Cameroonian international defender. Having arrived in Algiers ten days earlier, Malone signed a two-year contract running until June 2027, after successfully completing his medical. The club announced the deal on its official Facebook page. Transferred from Simba for €200,000, the Tanzanian club will also receive 15% of any future resale. Versatile in defense, Che can play as a center-back or right-back and is considered a high-potential talent. USMA also unveiled Mohamed Bouderbala from USM El Harrach, who signed a three-year deal. Two days after that, Zakaria Draoui signed a two-year contract with USM Alger after mutually terminating his deal with MC Alger, Draoui becomes the club's third summer signing, following Malone and Bouderbala. Draoui completed the move just before departing for Uganda with the Algeria A’ team to take part in CHAN 2025.

=== Start of season ===
USM Alger play their first match of the season on August 31, 2025, at 7:00 p.m. against MC Alger, as part of the second round of Ligue 1 Mobilis. The game take place at the Mustapha Tchaker Stadium in Blida, with attendance restricted exclusively to 6,000 USMA supporters. The club's management specified that tickets, allocated in stands 6 to 10, will be sold at the Omar Hamadi Stadium, with further details on sales procedures to be announced later. Since their opening match against JS Kabylie was postponed due to several USMA players being called up to the national A’ team for CHAN 2024 (rescheduled to 2025), the Red and Black will therefore begin their campaign with the major Algiers derby.

USM Alger started their season with a 0–0 draw. Abdelhak Benchikha fielded a balanced lineup with Che Malone and Alilet in defense, and an attacking trio of Ghacha, Benayad, and Khaldi. The team created a few chances but failed to convert in what was a tightly contested derby. This first test allows Benchikha to draw lessons ahead of the upcoming league fixtures.

==== First-team transfers (winter transfer window) ====
Salim Boukhanchouche left USM Alger on 30 November 2025 following the mutual termination of his contract. This decision came after several weeks of negotiations with the club's management. He thus became the first player to leave the club before the end of the first half of the season. Two weeks later, USM Alger officially announced the mutual termination of the contract of Liberian striker Emmanuel Ernest through a club statement. Recruited during the summer transfer window, the player failed to establish himself or meet sporting expectations. His spell with the Algiers-based club was therefore short-lived.

USM Alger also officially announced the signing of Ivorian striker Dramane Kamagaté. The announcement was made via the club's official Facebook page. In its statement, USMA indicated that the former San Pédro player signed a five-year contract. This recruitment is part of the club management's strategy to strengthen the squad ahead of upcoming national and continental competitions. On 27 January 2026, USM Alger confirmed the loan of striker Ghiles Guenaoui to CS Constantine until the end of the season. The Soustara-based club wished the player every success in this new experience. Having recently returned to competition after a serious cruciate ligament injury suffered in October 2024, Guenaoui was unable to regain his best form and was no longer among the choices of head coach Abdelhak Benchikha.

On 29 January 2026, USM Alger announced the mutual termination of the contract of forward Khaled Bousseliou, bringing an end to a three-and-a-half-year collaboration between the two parties. However, over the past two seasons, his performances had gradually declined, leading to the loss of his regular starting position under most of the head coaches who succeeded one another at the helm of the first team. During the latter part of his spell at USMA, he was no longer consistently included in the technical staff's plans.

On 31 January 2026, USM Alger officially announced the return of defender Imadeddine Azzi from Russian club Dynamo Makhachkala, signing a contract lasting two and a half years, according to a statement published on the club's social media platforms. This transfer was part of a bilateral exchange agreement between the two clubs, which also included the departure of Diaa Eddine Mechid to the Russian side. As part of the same deal, USM Alger secured a sell-on clause entitling the club to 25% of the value of any future transfer of Mechid to another club.

USM Alger also confirmed the signing of international defender Achref Abada on a three-and-a-half-year contract from ASO Chlef. The defender distinguished himself during the 2025 FIFA Arab Cup held in Qatar. In a statement released on 5 February, the Soustara-based club confirmed that the player had been officially cleared by FIFA following the validation of his file. His registration on the electronic platform was completed on 31 January 2026 at 00:05, confirming that all administrative and legal procedures had been duly respected. USM Alger further praised the cooperation and professionalism of ASO Chlef's management, which facilitated the completion of the transfer. The deal also includes a special clause: USM Alger will finance ASO Chlef's summer training camp next year if Abada is selected for the national team to prepare for the 2026 FIFA World Cup.

On 11 February 2026, USM Alger officially announced the transfer of Algerian international defender Adem Alilet to Libyan club Al Ittihad. The transfer fee was reported to be around €450,000. After six seasons with the Algiers-based side, Alilet left the club to begin a new experience abroad. The move allowed USM Alger to secure a financial return while reshaping its squad ahead of upcoming domestic and continental competitions.

=== Season run in ===
On December 25, 2025, the chairman of the board of USM Alger, Boubekeur Abid, resigned from his position due to an increasingly unworkable relationship with Sporting Director General Saïd Allik. Although their appointments were initially meant to bring stability and complementarity, deep disagreements over administrative management and the distribution of powers quickly strained relations between the two officials. Faced with a blocked and conflict ridden internal climate, Abid chose to step down. In accordance with the statutes of SSPA/USMA, an extraordinary general assembly was to be convened to formalize the resignation and elect a successor. This new administrative crisis occurred at a time when the first team was enjoying a relatively encouraging sporting period. Two days later, USM Alger officially announced the appointment of Bilel Nouioua as chairman of the board of directors of SSPA-USMA. He succeeds Aboubaker Abid following a decision taken by the Groupe SERPORT, the club's majority shareholder. This change is part of a restructuring effort aimed at strengthening governance and improving the administrative and sporting management of the Red and Blacks.

On 27 January 2026, USM Alger has announced the mutual termination of the contract of its head coach, Abdelhak Benchikha, following an agreement reached between both parties. This decision comes after a meeting held at the club's headquarters, which brought together the sporting director and the Algerian coach, and took place in a climate of mutual understanding. In an official statement, the USMA management expressed its gratitude and deep appreciation to Benchikha for the work accomplished and the efforts made during his time at the helm of the team. Pending the appointment of a new head coach, interim duties will be handled by Hadj Adlane, assisted by fitness coach Modjahed Belaid and goalkeeping coach Lyes Benhaha. This temporary staff will lead the team in the match against Djoliba, and possibly in the following fixture against San Pédro.

USM Alger announced on 20 February 2026 the appointment of Senegalese coach Lamine N'Diaye as head coach of the first team. At 69 years old, he signed a contract until the end of the season, with an option to renew depending on results and the objectives set by the club's management. An experienced coach on the African stage, N'Diaye notably won the CAF Champions League with TP Mazembe in 2010. In the same year, N'Diaye also led the Congolese club to the final of the 2010 FIFA Club World Cup, a historic achievement for an African club.

=== Record 10th Algerian Cup Triumph and Realme Partnership ===
USM Alger enjoyed another successful Algerian Cup campaign in 2025–26, successfully defending their title and making history by winning a record 10th Algerian Cup trophy. Their journey began with a difficult qualification against NC Magra, where the Usmistes advanced on penalties after a goalless draw. USMA then comfortably defeated MO Constantine 3–0 thanks to a hat-trick from Houssam Ghacha, before overcoming rivals USM El Harrach 3–2 after extra time in a tense Algiers derby, with Ghacha playing a decisive role throughout the match. In the quarter-finals, USMA edged JS Saoura 1–0 through a goal from Radouani, while in the semi-finals they defeated CA Batna 3–1 after extra time, with Bouderbala scoring a decisive brace to send the club into the final.

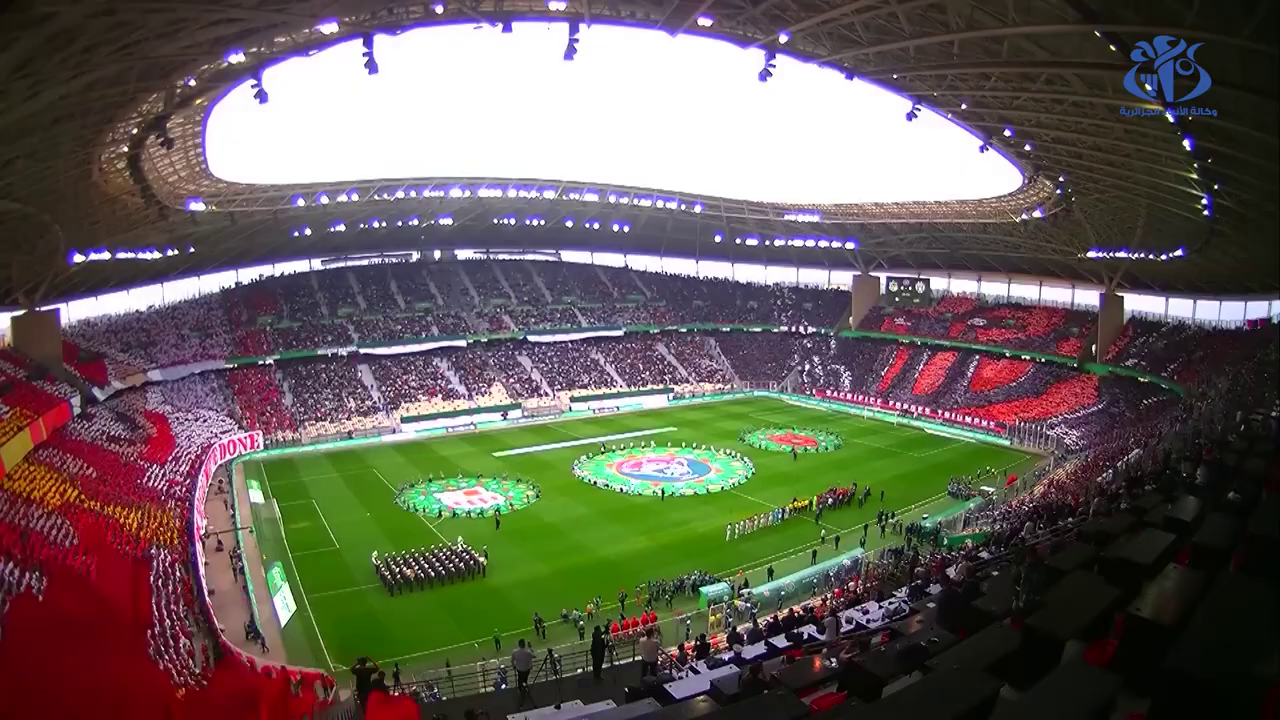
Supporters of CR Belouizdad and USM Alger during the 2026 Algerian Cup final.

In the final, USM Alger defeated arch-rivals CR Belouizdad 2–1 to secure their historic 10th Algerian Cup title, becoming the most successful club in the competition's history. After surviving an early CRB dominance, USMA took control through goals from Dramane Kamagaté and Ahmed Khaldi before halftime. Despite a second-half response from CR Belouizdad, the Red and Black remained defensively solid and held on until the final whistle, confirming their superiority in the Algiers derby and successfully retaining the trophy.

On 11 May 2025, several members of USM Alger were honored at the DZmatch Awards ceremony, organized to recognize the best performances in Algerian football during the season. Achref Abada won the award for Best Player in Algeria, while Oussama Benbot was named Best Goalkeeper. Cameroonian defender Che Malone received the Best Foreign Player award, whereas coach Lamine N'Diaye was elected Best Foreign Coach. USM Alger also received a special distinction during the ceremony.

On May 12, 2025, USM Alger officially announced a partnership with Realme, the Chinese giant specializing in smartphones and connected devices. Through this agreement, both parties aim to combine the passion of football with technological innovation. In its announcement, the brand highlighted their shared ambition, competitive spirit, and the passion of USMA supporters. For the Algerian club, this partnership represents a new source of revenue and an opportunity to strengthen its image on the African stage.

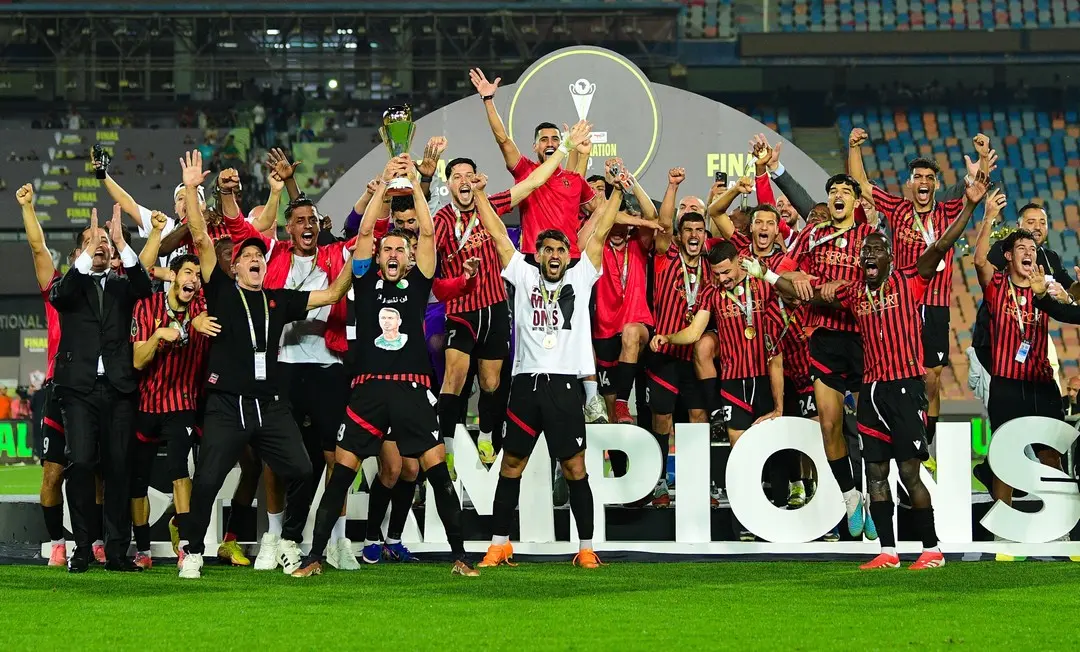
USM Alger are the champions of the 2025–26 CAF Confederation Cup.

The 2026 CAF Confederation Cup final was contested over two legs by USM Alger and Zamalek. In the first leg, played on 9 May 2026, USM Alger recorded a 1–0 home victory. The only goal of the match came from a stoppage-time penalty converted by Ahmed Khaldi. Throughout the game, USM Alger maintained control of possession and managed the tempo effectively through midfield. The second leg, held on 16 May 2026, was a closely fought encounter. After 90 minutes, the aggregate score remained 1–1, sending the final to a penalty shootout. USM Alger showed greater composure in the decisive moment, winning the shootout 8–7 to secure their second CAF Confederation Cup title.

A few days after USM Alger's continental triumph, sporting director Saïd Allik sparked controversy following statements made on national radio. He revealed internal tensions surrounding the appointment of coach Lamine Ndiaye, claiming that certain individuals attempted to block his arrival by contacting Billel Dziri despite an already finalized agreement. Allik also accused the club's management of being responsible for the failure to register players Achref Abada and Imadeddine Azzi with the CAF, even referring to a “betrayal from within the club.” He further requested that the Groupe SERPORT grant him full authority to manage the sporting department.

== Squad list ==
Players and squad numbers last updated on 6 June 2026.
Note: Flags indicate national team as has been defined under FIFA eligibility rules. Players may hold more than one non-FIFA nationality.

No.	Nat.	Name	Position	Date of birth (age)	Signed in	Contract ends	Signed from	Apps	Goals	Transfer fees
Goalkeepers
1	(Algeria)	Abdelmoumen Sifour	GK	3 March 1998 (aged 27)	2023	2027	(Algeria) RC Arbaâ	14	0	Free transfer
16	(Algeria)	Kamel Soufi	GK	5 June 1996 (aged 29)	2023	2027	(Algeria) MC Oran	40	0	Free transfer
25	(Algeria)	Oussama Benbot	GK	11 October 1994 (aged 30)	2021	2028	(Algeria) JS Kabylie	157	0	Free transfer
Defenders
2	(Algeria)	Walid Kourdi	LB	20 September 2005 (aged 19)	2024	2026	(Algeria) Reserve team	6	0	Academy Player
3	(Algeria)	Safieddine Atmania	CB	26 February 2005 (aged 20)	2024	2028	(Algeria) Reserve team	27	0	Academy Player
4	(Cameroon)	Che Malone	CB	23 May 1999 (aged 26)	2025	2027	(Tanzania) Simba	39	1	200,000 €
5	(Algeria)	Imadeddine Azzi (Note: Azzi played previously for USM Alger from 2024 to 2025.)	CB	21 June 1998 (aged 27)	2026	2028	(Russia) Dynamo Makhachkala	37	1	355,000 €
12	(Algeria)	Haithem Loucif (Note: Loucif played previously for USM Alger from 2021 to 2023.)	RB	8 July 1996 (aged 29)	2025	2027	(Switzerland) Yverdon-Sport	105	3	Free transfer
13	(Algeria)	Hocine Dehiri	CB	16 September 2000 (aged 24)	2023	2027	(Kuwait) Qadsia SC loan return	87	2	20,000,000 DA
19	(Algeria)	Saâdi Radouani (Note: Radouani played previously for USM Alger from 2015 to 2016.) (C.)	RB	18 March 1995 (aged 30)	2020	2028	(Algeria) ES Sétif	196	11	Free transfer
20	(Algeria)	Rayane Mahrouz	RB	30 November 2004 (aged 20)	2024	2027	(Algeria) Reserve team	49	4	Academy Player
23	(Algeria)	Ilyes Chetti	LB	22 January 1995 (aged 30)	2024	2027	(Morocco) Wydad AC	56	1	Free transfer
28	(Algeria)	Achref Abada	CB	15 June 1999 (aged 26)	2026	2029	(Algeria) ASO Chlef	11	0	650,000 €
Midfielders
6	(Algeria)	Zakaria Draoui	DM	12 February 1994 (aged 31)	2025	2027	(Algeria) MC Alger	42	6	Free transfer
8	(Algeria)	Islam Merili	AM	27 June 1998 (aged 27)	2022	2026	(Algeria) ASO Chlef	137	8	Free transfer
11	(Democratic Republic of the Congo)	Glody Likonza	AM	10 May 1998 (aged 27)	2024	2027	(Democratic Republic of the Congo) TP Mazembe	85	6	Free transfer
14	(Algeria)	Brahim Benzaza	DM	8 April 1997 (aged 28)	2021	2026	(Algeria) ASO Chlef	161	11	Free transfer
26	(Algeria)	Omar Boularas	AM	30 October 2005 (aged 19)	2025	2028	(Algeria) Reserve team	9	0	Academy Player
30	(Senegal)	Aimé Tendeng	AM	1 January 2001 (aged 24)	2025	2028	(Sudan) Al Hilal	44	2	260,000 €
Forwards
7	(Algeria)	Ahmed Khaldi	RW	22 July 1998 (aged 27)	2024	2027	(Kuwait) Al-Arabi SC	62	16	Free transfer
9	(Algeria)	Riad Benayad	ST	2 November 1996 (aged 28)	2025	2026	(Tunisia) Espérance de Tunis	53	5	Free transfer
22	(Algeria)	Moncif Boutaoui	LW	7 June 2005 (aged 20)	2024	2029	(Algeria) Reserve team	9	1	Academy Player
24	(Algeria)	Mohamed Bouderbala	LW	6 July 2005 (aged 20)	2025	2028	(Algeria) USM El Harrach	31	4	Free transfer
27	(Algeria)	Houssam Ghacha	LW	22 October 1995 (aged 29)	2024	2027	(Tunisia) Espérance de Tunis	74	17	Free transfer
29	(Ivory Coast)	Dramane Kamagaté	ST	1 May 2005 (aged 20)	2026	2031	(Ivory Coast) San Pédro	20	1	400,000 €

== Transfers ==
=== In ===
==== Summer ====
Date	Pos	Player	Moving from	Fee	Source
1 July 2025	AM	(Algeria) Kheireddine Toual	MC El Bayadh	Loan return	
1 July 2025	DM	(Algeria) Omar Embarek	ES Mostaganem	Loan return	
1 July 2025	CB	(Algeria) Hocine Dehiri	(Kuwait) Qadsia SC	Loan return	
29 July 2025	CB	(Cameroon) Che Malone	(Tanzania) Simba	200,000 €	
30 July 2025	FW	(Algeria) Mohamed Bouderbala	USM El Harrach	Free transfer	
31 July 2025	DM	(Algeria) Zakaria Draoui	MC Alger	Free transfer	
29 August 2025	AM	(Senegal) Aimé Tendeng	(Sudan) Al Hilal	260,000 €	
31 August 2025	ST	(Liberia) Emmanuel Ernest	(Albania) KF Tirana	500,000 €	

==== Winter ====
Date	Pos	Player	Moving from	Fee	Source
22 December 2025	ST	(Ivory Coast) Dramane Kamagaté	(Ivory Coast) San Pédro	400,000 €	
31 January 2026	CB	(Algeria) Imadeddine Azzi	(Russia) Dynamo Makhachkala	355,000 €	
31 January 2026	CB	(Algeria) Achref Abada	ASO Chlef	100,000,000 DA (Note: Achref Abada joined USM Alger for a reported transfer fee of DZD 100 million (approximately €662,000 at the official exchange rate).)	

=== Out ===
==== Summer ====
Date	Pos	Player	Moving to	Fee	Source
6 July 2025	CB	(Algeria) Imadeddine Azzi	(Kuwait) Kazma	Loan return	
6 July 2025	LB	(Algeria) Nabil Lamara	Unattached	End of contract	
6 July 2025	DM	(Algeria) Oussama Chita	Unattached	End of contract	
8 July 2025	CB	(Democratic Republic of the Congo) Kévin Mondeko	Unattached (Note: Mondeko joined CS Sfaxien on 7 August 2025.)	Free transfer (Released)	
10 July 2025	AM	(Bolivia) Adalid Terrazas	(Bolivia) San Antonio Bulo Bulo	214,000 €	
28 July 2025	AM	(Algeria) Kheireddine Toual	Unattached (Note: Toual joined ES Sétif on 30 July 2025.)	Free transfer (Released)	
28 July 2025	DM	(Algeria) Omar Embarek	Unattached (Note: Embarek joined MC Oran on 17 August 2025.)	Free transfer (Released)	
5 August 2025	LW	(Nigeria) Wale Musa Alli	Unattached (Note: Musa Alli joined Kiryat Shmona on 28 August 2025.)	Free transfer (Released)	
9 August 2025	AM	(Algeria) Abdelkrim Namani	Unattached (Note: Namani joined Paradou AC on 12 August 2025.)	Free transfer (Released)	
30 August 2025	RW	(Algeria) Mehdi Merghem	JS Kabylie	40,000,000 DA	
31 August 2025	ST	(Algeria) Mohamed Ben Mazouz	(Tunisia) Étoile du Sahel	200,000 €	
5 September 2025	ST	(Burundi) Bonfils-Caleb Bimenyimana	(Saudi Arabia) Jeddah	Free transfer (Released)	

==== Winter ====
Date	Pos	Player	Moving to	Fee	Source
30 November 2025	DM	(Algeria) Salim Boukhanchouche	Unattached (Note: Boukhanchouche joined CR Belouizdad on 10 December 2025.)	Free transfer (Released)	
14 December 2025	ST	(Liberia) Emmanuel Ernest	Unattached	Free transfer (Released)	
27 January 2026	LW	(Algeria) Ghiles Guenaoui	CS Constantine	Loan	
29 January 2026	LW	(Algeria) Khaled Bousseliou	Unattached	Free transfer (Released)	
31 January 2026	RW	(Algeria) Diaa Eddine Mechid	(Russia) Dynamo Makhachkala	210,000 €	
8 February 2026	CB	(Algeria) Adem Alilet	(Libya) Al Ittihad	450,000 €	

=== New contracts ===
No.	Pos	Player	Contract length	Contract end	Date	Source
25	GK	Oussama Benbot	2 years	2028	8 Feb 2026	
19	RB	Saâdi Radouani	2 years	2028	8 Feb 2026	

== Pre-season and friendlies ==
7 August 2025 Friendly	CA Bizertin (Tunisia)	0–1	(Algeria) USM Alger	Tabarka, Tunisia
17:00 UTC+1		Report	Benzaza 89'
Note: Lineup for USM Alger; First half – Benbot, Mahrouz, Loucif, Atamnia, Malone, Likonza, Merili, Benayad, Ghacha, Bouderbala, Ben Mazouz. Second half – Soufi, Dehiri, Issam Yasser Bayoud, Walid Kourdi, Namani, Boukhanchouche, Benzaza, Guenaoui, Bousseliou, Khaldi, Moncif Abderrahmane Boutaoui.

10 August 2025 Friendly	SC Ben Arous (Tunisia)	0–1	(Algeria) USM Alger	Tabarka, Tunisia
17:30 UTC+1		Report	Genaoui 10'
Note: Lineup for USM Alger; First half – Soufi, Walid Kourdi, Loucif, Atamnia, Dehiri, Benzaza, Likonza, Ala Eddine Limane, Khaldi, Guenaoui, Benayad. Second half – Sifour, Mahrouz, Issam Yasser Bayoud, Che Malone, Loucif (Walid Kourdi, 73'), Boukhanchouche, Merili, Bouderbala, Bousseliou, Guenaoui (Ala Eddine Limane, 73'), Ghacha.

14 August 2025 Friendly	USM Alger	1–0	MB Rouissat	Tabarka, Tunisia
16:30 UTC+1	Khaldi 66'	Report
Note: Lineup for USM Alger – Benbot, Dehiri (Atamnia, 75'), Che Malone (Issam Yasser Bayoud, 80'), Mahrouz, Loucif (Walid Kourdi, 80'), Boukhanchouche (Ala Eddine Limane, 80'), Benzaza, Merili (Likonza, 75'), Bousseliou, Khaldi (Bouderbala, 75'), Ghacha (Moncif Abderrahmane Boutaoui, 80').

23 August 2025 Friendly	USM Alger	2–0	JS Tixeraïne	Bologhine
17:00 UTC+1	Benayad 34'; Dehiri 37'	Report		Stadium: Omar Hamadi Stadium; Attendance: 0 (close doors)
Note: Lineup for USM Alger; First half – Benbot, Dehiri, Che Malone, Mahrouz, Loucif, Boukhanchouche, Benzaza, Merili, Benayad, Khaldi, Ghacha. Second half – Soufi, Dehiri (Atamnia, 74'), Mahrouz, Loucif (Walid Kourdi, 74'), Boukhanchouche (Likonza, 66'), Benzaza (Bouderbala, 74'), Guenaoui, Ben Mazouz, Khaldi (Ala Eddine Limane, 66'), Ghacha (Bousseliou, 66').

== Competitions ==
=== Overview ===
Competition	Record								Started round	Final position / round	First match	Last match
Competition	G	W	D	L	GF	GA	GD	Win %	Started round	Final position / round	First match	Last match
Ligue 1	30	8	15	7	34	29	+5	26.67	—N/a	10th	31 August 2025	6 June 2026
Algerian Cup	6	5	1	0	12	4	+8	83.33	Round of 64	Winners	4 December 2025	30 April 2026
Super Cup	1	0	0	1	0	1	−1	0.00	Final	Runners-up	17 January 2026	
Confederation Cup	14	7	4	3	16	9	+7	50.00	Second round	Winners	19 October 2025	16 May 2026
Total	51	20	20	11	62	43	+19	39.22				

Updated to match played 6 June 2026
Source: Competitions

=== Ligue 1 ===
==== League table ====
Pos	Team	Pld	W	D	L	GF	GA	GD	Pts	Qualification or relegation
8	ES Ben Aknoun	30	11	10	9	41	39	+2	43	
9	CS Constantine	30	11	10	9	35	30	+5	43	
10	USM Alger (Note: USM Alger qualified for the 2026–27 CAF Confederation Cup by winning the 2025–26 Algerian Cup)	30	8	15	7	34	29	+5	39	Qualification for CAF Confederation Cup
11	ES Sétif	30	10	9	11	33	36	−3	39	
12	MB Rouissat	30	9	9	12	30	35	−5	36	

Source: lfp.dz
Rules for classification: 1) Points; 2) Head-to-head points; 3) Head-to-head goal difference; 4) First half goal difference; 5) First half total goals; 6) Fairplay ranking; 7) Playoff.

==== Results summary ====
Overall								Home						Away					
Pld	W	D	L	GF	GA	GD	Pts	W	D	L	GF	GA	GD	W	D	L	GF	GA	GD
30	8	15	7	34	29	+5	39	5	8	2	18	12	+6	3	7	5	16	17	−1

Last updated: 6 June 2026.
Source: Competitive matches

==== Results by round ====
Round	1	2	3	4	5	6	7	8	9	10	11	12	13	14	15	16	17	18	19	20	21	22	23	24	25	26	27	28	29	30
Ground	A	H	A	H	A	H	A	H	A	H	A	A	H	A	H	H	A	H	A	H	A	H	A	H	A	H	H	A	H	A
Result	W	D	W	D	L	D	D	W	W	W	D	D	D	D	D	L	L	W	L	L	D	D	L	W	L	D	D	D	W	D
Position	5	5	2	2	5	6	7	4	2	2	3	3	3	3	3	4	7	6	6	9	8	9	11	9	10	10	10	10	10	10

Updated to match(es) played on 6 June 2026. Source: Competitive matches
A = Away; H = Home; W = Win; D = Draw; L = Loss

==== Matches ====
The league fixtures were announced on 31 July 2025.

All times are local, WAT (UTC+1).

Win Draw Loss Postponed

31 August 2025 Round 2	USM Alger	0–0	MC Alger	Blida
19:00		Soccerway; LFP		Stadium: Mustapha Tchaker Stadium; Attendance: 6.000; Referee: Rafik Aouina; Assistant referees: Lotfi Zerrouka, Redouane Amroun; Fourth official: Abderahmane Mohamed Belkebir; VAR: Fateh Harkat
Note: USM Alger play their first match of the season on August 31, 2025, at 7:00 p.m. against MC Alger, as part of Matchday 2 of Ligue 1 Mobilis, at the Mustapha Tchaker Stadium in Blida, with the exclusive presence of 6,000 USMA supporters.

6 September 2025 Round 3	Paradou AC	0–1	USM Alger	Dar El Beïda
17:00		Soccerway; LFP	Khaldi 47'	Stadium: Omar Benrabah Stadium; Attendance: 0 (close doors); Referee: Fateh Harkat; Assistant referees: Hamza Zitouni, Mohamed Ghozlane; Fourth official: Hamza Bouslimani

13 September 2025 Round 4	USM Alger	1–1	USM Khenchela	Blida
19:00	Guenaoui 75'	Soccerway; LFP	Bakir 45+3'	Stadium: Mustapha Tchaker Stadium; Attendance: 6.000; Referee: Mohamed Bouteraa; Assistant referees: Abbes Akram Zerhouni, Asma Feriel Ouahab; Fourth official: Dhikra Houia; VAR: Anes Azrine
Note: USM Alger played on September 13, 2025, at 7:00 p.m. against USM Khenchela, as part of Matchday 4 of Ligue 1 Mobilis, at the Mustapha Tchaker Stadium in Blida, with the exclusive presence of 6,000 USMA supporters.

20 September 2025 Round 5	JS Saoura	1–0	USM Alger	Béchar
17:30	Hammia 7'	Soccerway; LFP		Stadium: 20 August 1955 Stadium; Referee: Ayoub Belhachemi; Assistant referees: Sofiane Cherif Zaatri, Daoud Houari; Fourth official: Benamar Sellakh

29 September 2025 Round 6	USM Alger	1–1	MC El Bayadh	Dar El Beïda
16:00	Mahrouz 90+4'	Soccerway; LFP	Benyahia 90+7'	Stadium: Omar Benrabah Stadium; Attendance: 0 (close doors); Referee: Youcef Taieb Bouderbal; Assistant referees: Akram Sohbi, Boualem Boutaiba; Fourth official: Karim Ait Amer Meziane; VAR: Redouane Allou

4 October 2025 Round 7	CS Constantine	1–1	USM Alger	Constantine
17:45	Dib 43' (pen.)	Soccerway; LFP	Draoui 7'	Stadium: Chahid Hamlaoui Stadium; Referee: Yahia Dehar; Assistant referees: Mustapha Kessar, Mohamed Rezga; Fourth official: Zouhir Mansri; VAR: Fateh Harkat

29 October 2025 Round 9	ES Sétif	1–3	USM Alger	Sétif
18:00	Djahnit 62' (pen.)	Soccerway; LFP	Benzaza 19'; Draoui 21'; Bousseliou 82'	Stadium: 8 May 1945 Stadium; Referee: Mustapha Ghorbal; Assistant referees: Mokrane Gourari, Akram Zerhouni; Fourth official: Haitham Ghouti; VAR: Lahlou Benbraham

2 November 2025 Round 10	USM Alger	1–0	ASO Chlef	Baraki
19:00	Draoui 31'	Soccerway; LFP		Stadium: Nelson Mandela Stadium; Referee: Lahlou Benbraham; Assistant referees: Amirouche Boufassa, Houari Daoud; Fourth official: Abderrahmane Sahraoui; VAR: Alaa Bouab

8 November 2025 Round 11	CR Belouizdad	0–0	USM Alger	Algiers
14:30		Soccerway; LFP		Stadium: Stade du 5 Juillet; Referee: Akram Mechairia; Assistant referees: Mohamed Hamaidi, Mohamed Benhamouda; Fourth official: Tayeb Benyabka; VAR: Redouane Allou

17 November 2025 Round 12	ES Mostaganem	2–2	USM Alger	Chlef
16:00	Haroun 30'; El Moudene 48'	Soccerway; LFP	Khaldi 9'; Ghacha 75' (pen.)	Stadium: Mohamed Boumezrag Stadium; Referee: Alaa Bouab; Assistant referees: Anouar Ghazli, Islem Boukhatem; Fourth official: Nabil Boukhalfa; VAR: Fateh Harkat

8 December 2025 Round 1	JS Kabylie	1–2	USM Alger	Tizi Ouzou
17:45	Mahious 61'	Soccerway; LFP	Khaldi 43'; Likonza 80'	Stadium: Hocine Aït Ahmed Stadium; Referee: Tahar Boudjemaa; Assistant referees: Amirouche Boufassa, Youcef Arioua; Fourth official: Mohamed Chaoubi; VAR: Redouane Allou
Note: the match between JS Kabylie and USM Alger is postponed from August 21, to a later date, due to the presence of six players from USM Alger with their national teams in the African Nations Championship.

18 December 2025 Round 13	USM Alger	2–2	ES Ben Aknoun	Algiers
20:00	Khaldi 19'; Loucif 45+2'	Soccerway; LFP	Saâd 27'; Oukali 69'	Stadium: Stade du 5 Juillet; Referee: Lotfi Bekouassa; Assistant referees: Hocine Hadj Yahia, Karim Kaoua; Fourth official: Dhikra Houia; VAR: Nabil Boukhalfa

22 December 2025 Round 8	USM Alger	2–0	MB Rouissat	Algiers
19:30	Alilet 16'; Likonza 77'	Soccerway; LFP		Stadium: Stade du 5 Juillet; Referee: Fateh Harkat; Assistant referees: Mohamed Ghozlane, Hamza Zitouni; Fourth official: Abderahmane Mohamed Belkebir; VAR:Akram Mechairia

27 December 2025 Round 14	Olympique Akbou	1–1	USM Alger	Béjaïa
14:00	Gherbi 69'	Soccerway; LFP	Khaldi 77'	Stadium: Maghrebi Unity Stadium; Referee: Yahia Dahar; Assistant referees: Mohamed Rezga, Mustapha Kessar; Fourth official: Oussama Mekfoudji; VAR: Redouane Allou

8 January 2026 Round 15	USM Alger	1–1	MC Oran	Algiers
20:00	Alilet 51'	Soccerway; LFP	Aliane 90+4'	Stadium: Stade du 5 Juillet; Referee: Mehdi Oukil; Assistant referees: Houari Daoud, Kheireddine Djenadi; Fourth official: Sid Ahmed Lellouchi; VAR: Abderrahmane Sahraoui

21 February 2026 Round 20	USM Alger	1–2	JS Saoura	Algiers
22:00	Ghacha 60' (pen.)	Soccerway; LFP	Bentaleb 8', 39'	Stadium: Stade du 5 Juillet; Referee: Tayeb Benyabka; Assistant referees: Akram Zerhouni, Boumediene Touileb; Fourth official: Sid Ahmed Lellouchi; VAR: Nabil Boukhalfa

27 February 2026 Round 21	MC El Bayadh	0–0	USM Alger	El Bayadh
14:30		Soccerway; LFP		Stadium: Zakaria Medjdoub Stadium; Referee: Fateh Harkat; Assistant referees: Mohamed Ghozlane, Mohamed Benhamouda; Fourth official: Abdelhafid Boudaa

8 March 2026 Round 22	USM Alger	0–0	CS Constantine	Algiers
22:00		Soccerway; LFP		Stadium: Stade du 5 Juillet; Referee: Youcef Taieb Bouderbal; Assistant referees: Akram Sohbi, Boualem Boutaiba; Fourth official: Hichem Benokba; VAR: Redouane Allou

18 March 2026 Round 24	USM Alger	2–0	ES Sétif	Algiers
22:00	Mahrouz 9'; Dehiri 34'	Soccerway; LFP		Stadium: Stade du 5 Juillet; Referee: Nabil Boukhalfa; Assistant referees: Yacine Ouerd Benslama, Amine Belaroussi; Fourth official: Louay Hassani; VAR: Yahia Dahar

25 March 2026 Round 16	USM Alger	0–1	JS Kabylie	Algiers
20:00		Soccerway; LFP	Madani 11'	Stadium: Stade du 5 Juillet; Referee: Alaa Bouab; Assistant referees: Anouar Ghazli, Islem Boukhatem; Fourth official: Abderahmane Mohamed Belkebir; VAR: Youcef Taieb Bouderbal

1 April 2026 Round 17	MC Alger	1–0	USM Alger	Douéra
16:00	Ferhat 14'	Soccerway; LFP		Stadium: Ali La Pointe Stadium; Attendance: 0 (close doors); Referee: Yahia Dehar; Assistant referees: Mustapha Kessar, Mohamed Rezga; Fourth official: Badrdine Rachedi; VAR: Akram Mechairia

5 April 2026 Round 25	ASO Chlef	2–1	USM Alger	Chlef
17:45	Benchouya 36'; Debbari 68' (pen.)	Soccerway; LFP	Tendeng 27'	Stadium: Mohamed Boumezrag Stadium; Referee: Abdelali Ibrir; Assistant referees: Lamine Chellali, Abdelkader Mansar; Fourth official: Mustapha Tiaiba; VAR: Mustapha Ghorbal

12 May 2026 Round 27	USM Alger	1–1	ES Mostaganem	Algiers
19:00	Benayad 10' (pen.)	Soccerway; LFP	Laireche 22'	Stadium: Stade du 5 Juillet; Referee: Haitham Ghouti; Assistant referees: Sami Djaouad, Younes Moulahcene; Fourth official: Mohamed Chaoubi; VAR: Anes Azrine

19 May 2026 Round 29	USM Alger	1–0	Olympique Akbou	Algiers
20:00	Bouderbala 1'	Soccerway; LFP		Stadium: Stade du 5 Juillet; Referee: Alaa Bouab; Assistant referees: Anouar Ghazli, Yakoub Khellouf; Fourth official: Mohamed Chaoubi; VAR: Yahia Dahar

22 May 2026 Round 18	USM Alger	4–2	Paradou AC	Algiers
18:00	Khaldi 23'; Likonza 49'; Benayad 82', 90+3'	Soccerway; LFP	Ramdaoui 44', 58'	Stadium: Stade du 5 Juillet; Referee: Tayeb Benyabka; Assistant referees: Boumediene Touileb, Asma Ouahab; Fourth official: Youcef Abane; VAR: Abderahmane Mohamed Belkebir

25 May 2026 Round 19	USM Khenchela	2–1	USM Alger	Khenchela
16:00	Etouga 9'; Chekal 39'	Soccerway; LFP	Draoui 42' (pen.)	Stadium: Amar Hamam Stadium; Referee: Naïm Bouara; Assistant referees: Mohamed Azza, Ihab Feddak; Fourth official: Abdennour Khalfallah

30 May 2026 Round 23	MB Rouissat	1–0	USM Alger	Ouargla
16:00	Benkheira 66'	Soccerway; LFP		Stadium: 18 February Stadium; Referee: Zine Elabidine Dekhane; Assistant referees: Ayoub Deghache, Riadh Bensehil; Fourth official: Alaaeddine Salmi

2 June 2026 Round 26	USM Alger	1–1	CR Belouizdad	Algiers
20:00	Khaldi 40' (pen.)	Soccerway; LFP	Ben Hammouda 4'	Stadium: Stade du 5 Juillet; Referee: Abdelali Ibrir; Assistant referees: Lamine Chellali, Abdelkader Menacer; Fourth official: Louay Hassani; VAR: Haitham Ghouti

4 June 2026 Round 28	ES Ben Aknoun	2–2	USM Alger	Belouizdad
17:00	Djabout 52'; Hachoud 83'	Soccerway; LFP	Bayoud 29'; Khaldi 89'	Stadium: 20 August 1955 Stadium; Referee: Anes Azrine; Assistant referees: Mohamed Kelikha, Abdelkader Slimani; Fourth official: Akram Berrani; VAR: Abderahmane Mohamed Belkebir

6 June 2026 Round 30	MC Oran	2–2	USM Alger	Bir El Djir
18:00	Moulay 76'; Benkhedim 78'	Soccerway; LFP	Boutaoui 25'; Chetti 27'	Stadium: Miloud Hadefi Stadium; Referee: Fateh Harkat; Assistant referees: Mohamed Benhamouda, Hamza Zitouni; Fourth official: Dhikra Houia; VAR: Akram Mechairia

=== Algerian Cup ===
4 December 2025 Round of 64	NC Magra	0–0 (a.e.t.) (4–5 p)	USM Alger	Magra
14:00		Report		Stadium: Boucheligue Brothers Stadium; Referee: Nabil Boukhalfa; Assistant referees: Yacine Ouerd Benslama, Amine Belaroussi; Fourth official: Said Aouina
	Penalties
	Tamer (penalty scored); Bouchouareb (penalty scored); Nemdil (penalty scored); Bouhalfaya (penalty missed); Mohra (penalty scored)		Ghacha (penalty scored); Alilet (penalty scored); Radouani (penalty scored); Benayad (penalty scored); Merili (penalty scored)

14 December 2025 Round of 32	USM Alger	3–0	MO Constantine	Algiers
19:00	Ghacha 19', 59', 80'	Report		Stadium: Stade du 5 Juillet; Referee: Tayeb Benyebka; Assistant referees: Boumediene Touileb, Asma Feriel Ouahab; Fourth official: Louay Hassani

12 January 2026 Round of 16	USM El Harrach	2–3 (a.e.t.)	USM Alger	Baraki
17:00	Bechou 21'; Chouki 88'	Report	Loucif 6'; Likonza 71'; Ghacha 101'	Stadium: Nelson Mandela Stadium; Referee: Youcef Tayeb Bouderbal; Assistant referees: Akram Sohbi, Boualem Boutaiba; Fourth official: Massinissa Serdjane

4 March 2026 Quarter-finals	USM Alger	1–0	JS Saoura	Algiers
22:00	Radouani 36'	Report		Stadium: Stade du 5 Juillet; Referee: Akram Mechairia; Assistant referees: Mohamed Hamaidi, Hamza Zitouni; Fourth official: Abderahmane Mohamed Belkebir; VAR: Yahia Dahar

24 April 2026 Semi-finals	CA Batna	1–3 (a.e.t.)	USM Alger	Batna
18:00	Guettout 40'	Report	Tendeng 12'; Bouderbala 99', 120+1'	Stadium: 1 November 1954 Stadium; Referee: Tayeb Benyebka; Assistant referees: Boumediene Touileb, Asma Ouahab; Fourth official: Fateh Harkat; VAR: Youcef Taieb Bouderbal

30 April 2026 Final	USM Alger	2–1	CR Belouizdad	Baraki
17:00	Kamagaté 22'; Khaldi 44'	Report	Ouassa 62'	Stadium: Nelson Mandela Stadium; Attendance: 25,000; Referee: Akram Mechairia; Assistant referees: Mokrane Gourari, Mohamed Ghozlane; Fourth official: Alaa Bouab; VAR: Youcef Taieb Bouderbal

=== Super Cup ===
17 January 2026	MC Alger	1–0	USM Alger	Baraki
17:00	Naidji 74'	Report		Stadium: Nelson Mandela Stadium; Attendance: 20,000; Referee: Anes Azrine; Assistant referees: Mohamed Klikha, Abdelkader Slimani; Fourth official: Mehdi Oukil; VAR: Alaa Bouab

=== Confederation Cup ===
==== Qualifying rounds ====
In the qualifying rounds, each tie will be played on a home-and-away two-legged basis. If the aggregate score will be tied after the second leg, the away goals rule will be applied, and if still tied, extra time will not be played, and a penalty shoot-out will be used to determine the winner (Regulations III. 13 & 14). The draw for the qualifying rounds was held on 9 August 2025, 10:00 GMT (13:00 local time, UTC+3), in Dar es Salaam, Tanzania.

===== Second round =====
19 October 2025 First leg	AFAD Djékanou (Ivory Coast)	1–0	(Algeria) USM Alger	Abidjan
16:00 UTC+0	Jarju 10'	Report		Stadium: Alassane Ouattara Stadium; Referee: Abdallah Jammeh (Gambia); Assistant referees: Abass Bah, Essaha Sowe (Gambia)
Note: USM Alger Lineups: Benbot, Dehiri, Malone, Loucif, Benzaza, Draoui (substituted off) (Ernest, (substituted on) 87'), Boukhanchouche (substituted off) 46' (Guenaoui, (substituted on) 46'), Merili, Likonza (substituted off) 68' (Tendeng, (substituted on) 68'), Ghacha (substituted off) 68' (Bouderbala, (substituted on) 68'), Khaldi.

25 October 2025 Second leg	USM Alger (Algeria)	3–0 (3–1 agg.)	(Ivory Coast) AFAD Djékanou	Algiers
14:30 UTC+1	Ghacha 14', 90+2'; Benzaza 29'	Report		Stadium: Stade du 5 Juillet; Referee: Jean-Pierre Nguiene Bissila (Congo); Assistant referees: : Vital Dictin Mapangoulou, Prefina Jean Prislas Malanda (Congo); Fourth official: Fitial Charel Just Kokolo (Congo)
Note: USM Alger Lineups: Benbot, Dehiri (substituted off) 76' (Loucif, (substituted on) 76'), Malone (substituted off) 85' (Atamnia, (substituted on) 85'), Radouani, Chetti, Draoui, Benzaza (substituted off) 68' (Likonza, (substituted on) 68'), Merili (substituted off) 85' (Bousseliou, (substituted on) 85'), Tendeng, Guenaoui (substituted off) 68' (Bouderbala, (substituted on) 68'), Ghacha.

==== Group stage ====
The draw for the group stage was held on 3 November 2025, 11:00 GMT (13:00 local time, UTC+2), in Johannesburg, South Africa. The 16 winners of the second round were drawn into four groups of four. The teams were seeded by their performances in the CAF competitions for the previous five seasons (CAF 5-year ranking points shown next to every team). Each group contained one team from each of Pot 1 and Pot 2, Pot 3 and Pot 4, and each team was allocated to the positions in their group according to their pot.

Pos	Team	Pld	W	D	L	GF	GA	GD	Pts	Qualification	USMA	OCS	DAC	FCSP
1	(Algeria) USM Alger	6	4	2	0	9	4	+5	14	Advance to knockout stage	—	0–0	2–0	3–2
2	(Morocco) Olympic Safi	6	4	1	1	7	4	+3	13	Advance to knockout stage	0–1	—	2–1	2–1
3	(Mali) Djoliba	6	1	1	4	5	7	−2	4		0–0	0–1	—	4–0
4	(Ivory Coast) San Pédro	6	1	0	5	8	14	−6	3		2–3	0–1	2–0	—

Source: CAF

23 November 2025 1	USM Alger (Algeria)	3–2	(Ivory Coast) San Pédro	Algiers
20:00 UTC+1	Ghacha 17'; Alilet 61'; Radouani 82'	Report	Kamagate 65'; Karamoko 90+7'	Stadium: Stade du 5 Juillet; Referee: Tewodros Mitiku (Ethiopia); Assistant referees: Fasika Biru Yehualashet, Tigle Belachew (Ethiopia); Fourth official: Belay Tadesse (Ethiopia)

28 November 2025 2	Olympic Safi (Morocco)	0–1	(Algeria) USM Alger	Safi
20:00 UTC+1		Report	Draoui 84'	Stadium: El Massira Stadium; Referee: Mohammad Maarouf (Egypt); Assistant referees: Ahmed Hossam Taha, Samir Gamal (Egypt); Fourth official: Mahmoud Nagy (Egypt)

24 January 2026 3	USM Alger (Algeria)	2–0	(Mali) Djoliba	Algiers
20:00 UTC+1	Draoui 13'; Khaldi 84'	Report		Stadium: Stade du 5 Juillet; Referee: Mohamed Diraneh (Djibouti); Assistant referees: Robleh Eleyeh Dirir, Rachid Bouraleh (Djibouti); Fourth official: Nasser Mahamoud Houssein (Djibouti)

1 February 2026 4	Djoliba (Mali)	0–0	(Algeria) USM Alger	Bamako
16:00 UTC+0		Report		Stadium: Stade du 26 Mars; Referee: Ahmed Arajiga (Tanzania); Assistant referees: Ally Hamdani, Ally Ramadhani (Tanzania)

8 February 2026 5	San Pédro (Ivory Coast)	2–3	(Algeria) USM Alger	San Pédro
16:00 UTC+0	I. Dosso 6', 38'	Report	Malone 2'; Likonza 5'; Bouderbala 90+2'	Stadium: Laurent Pokou Stadium; Referee: Naby Laye Touré (Guinea); Assistant referees: Mamady Tere, Kaba Fadiga (Guinea); Fourth official: Younoussa Tawel Camara (Guinea)

14 February 2026 6	USM Alger (Algeria)	0–0	(Morocco) Olympic Safi	Algiers
20:00 UTC+1		Report		Stadium: Stade du 5 Juillet; Referee: Sulaiman Santio Kamara (Sierra Leone); Assistant referees: Mahmoud Alie Conteh (Sierra Leone), Hélio Semedo (Cape Verde); Fourth official: Fabrício Duarte (Cape Verde)

==== knockout stage ====
Each tie in the knockout phase will be played over two legs, with each team playing one leg at home. The team that will score more goals on aggregate over the two legs will advance to the next round. If the aggregate score will be level, the away goals rule will be applied, i.e. the team that will score more goals away from home over the two legs will advance. If away goals will be also equal, then extra time will not be played and the winners will be decided by a penalty shoot-out (Regulations III. 26 & 27).

The draw for the knockout stage (quarter-finals and semi-finals), was held on 17 February 2026, 11:00 GMT (13:00 local time, UTC+2), at the CAF headquarters in Cairo, Egypt.

===== Quarter-finals =====
15 March 2026 First leg	Maniema Union (Democratic Republic of the Congo)	2–1	(Algeria) USM Alger	Lubumbashi
15:00 UTC+2	Pitroipa 41' (pen.); Moanda 65'	Report	Khaldi 53' (pen.)	Stadium: Stade TP Mazembe; Referee: Louis Houngnandandé (Benin); Assistant referees: Eric Ayimavo (Benin), Dimbiniaina Andriatianarivelo (Madagascar); Fourth official: Andofetra Rakotojaona(Madagascar); VAR: Letticia Viana (Eswatini)

22 March 2026 Second leg	USM Alger (Algeria)	1–0 (2–2 agg.)	(Democratic Republic of the Congo) Maniema Union	Algiers
20:00 UTC+1	Benzaza 30'	Report		Stadium: Stade du 5 Juillet; Attendance: 16,000; Referee: Boubou Traoré (Mali); Assistant referees: Modibo Samaké (Mali), Jonathan Koffi Ahonto (Togo); Fourth official: VAR: Pierre Atcho (Gabon)

===== Semi-finals =====
11 April 2026 First leg	USM Alger (Algeria)	0–0	(Morocco) Olympic Safi	Algiers
17:00 UTC+1		Report		Stadium: Stade du 5 Juillet; Attendance: 16,000; Referee: Amin Mohamed Omar (Egypt); Assistant referees: Mahmoud Abouelregal (Egypt), Ahmed Hossam Taha (Egypt); Fourth official: Mohammad Maarouf (Egypt); VAR: Mahmoud Ashour (Egypt)

19 April 2026 Second leg	Olympic Safi (Morocco)	1–1 (1–1 agg.)	(Algeria) USM Alger	Safi
20:00 UTC+1	Koné 75'	Report	Khaldi 45+4' (pen.)	Stadium: El Massira Stadium; Referee: Samuel Uwikunda (Rwanda); Assistant referees: Gilbert Cheruiyot (Kenya), Ivanildo Lopes (Angola); Fourth official: Alhadji Allaou Mahamat (Chad); VAR: Issa Sy (Senegal)

===== Final =====
9 May 2026 First leg	USM Alger (Algeria)	1–0	(Egypt) Zamalek	Algiers
20:00 UTC+1	Khaldi 90+8' (pen.)	Report		Stadium: Stade du 5 Juillet; Referee: Dahane Beida (Mauritania); Assistant referees: Ivanildo Lopes (Angola), Elvis Noupoue (Cameroon); Fourth official: Abdelaziz Bouh (Mauritania); VAR: Daniel Nii Laryea (Ghana)

16 May 2026 Second leg	Zamalek (Egypt)	1–0 (1–1 agg.) (7–8 p)	(Algeria) USM Alger	Cairo
21:00 UTC+3	Dabbagh 5' (pen.)	Report		Stadium: Cairo International Stadium; Referee: Pierre Atcho (Gabon); Assistant referees: Boris Ditsoga (Gabon), Amos Abeigne (Gabon); Fourth official: Tanguy Mebiame (Gabon); VAR: Haythem Guirat (Tunisia)
	Penalties
	El Said (penalty scored); Abdel Rahim (penalty scored); Abdelmaguid (penalty scored); Mansi (penalty scored); Jaziri (penalty scored); Alvina (penalty scored); El Sayed (penalty scored); Shehata (penalty missed)		Draoui (penalty scored); Khaldi (penalty scored); Radouani (penalty scored); Benayad (penalty scored); Loucif (penalty scored); Chetti (penalty scored); Dehiri (penalty scored); Likonza (penalty scored)

== Squad information ==
=== Appearances and goals ===
No.	Pos	Player	Nat	Ligue 1			Algerian Cup			Super Cup			Confederation Cup			Total		
No.	Pos	Player	Nat	App	St	G	App	St	G	App	St	G	App	St	G	App	St	G
Goalkeepers
1	GK	Abdelmoumen Sifour	(Algeria)	3	3	0	0	0	0	0	0	0	0	0	0	3	3	0
16	GK	Kamel Soufi	(Algeria)	13	13	0	2	2	0	0	0	0	1	1	0	16	16	0
25	GK	Oussama Benbot	(Algeria)	14	14	0	4	4	0	1	1	0	13	13	0	32	32	0
Defenders
2	LB	Walid Kourdi	(Algeria)	6	0	0	0	0	0	0	0	0	0	0	0	6	0	0
3	CB	Safieddine Atmania	(Algeria)	10	9	0	1	1	0	1	0	0	5	1	0	17	11	0
4	CB	Che Malone	(Cameroon)	19	18	0	5	4	0	1	1	0	14	14	1	39	37	1
5	CB	Imadeddine Azzi	(Algeria)	9	9	0	2	2	0	0	0	0	–	–	–	11	11	0
12	RB	Haithem Loucif	(Algeria)	23	17	1	4	2	1	1	1	0	14	10	0	42	30	2
13	CB	Hocine Dehiri	(Algeria)	20	19	1	6	6	0	1	1	0	14	14	0	41	40	1
19	RB	Saâdi Radouani	(Algeria)	20	19	0	6	6	1	1	1	0	11	10	1	38	36	2
20	RB	Rayane Mahrouz	(Algeria)	14	12	2	2	0	0	0	0	0	3	2	0	19	14	2
23	LB	Ilyes Chetti	(Algeria)	18	14	1	3	0	0	0	0	0	5	3	0	26	17	1
28	CB	Achref Abada	(Algeria)	8	6	0	3	2	0	0	0	0	–	–	–	11	8	0
33	RB	Issam Bayoud	(Algeria)	2	1	1	0	0	0	0	0	0	0	0	0	2	1	1
55	CB	Mohamed Ait Namane	(Algeria)	2	1	0	0	0	0	0	0	0	–	–	–	2	1	0
Midfielders
6	DM	Zakaria Draoui	(Algeria)	24	22	4	3	3	0	1	1	0	14	14	2	42	40	6
8	AM	Islam Merili	(Algeria)	20	16	0	6	6	0	1	1	0	13	13	0	40	36	0
11	AM	Glody Likonza	(Democratic Republic of the Congo)	24	15	3	6	4	1	1	1	0	14	6	1	45	26	5
14	DM	Brahim Benzaza	(Algeria)	23	17	1	6	4	0	1	1	0	13	9	2	43	31	3
26	DM	Omar Boularas	(Algeria)	8	2	0	0	0	0	0	0	0	0	0	0	8	2	0
30	AM	Aimé Tendeng	(Senegal)	24	14	1	6	4	1	1	0	0	13	8	0	44	26	2
32	DM	Alaeddine Limane	(Algeria)	6	4	0	0	0	0	0	0	0	0	0	0	6	4	0
Forwards
7	RW	Ahmed Khaldi	(Algeria)	25	21	8	6	5	1	1	0	0	13	12	4	45	38	13
9	ST	Riad Benayad	(Algeria)	24	15	3	3	1	0	0	0	0	7	1	0	34	17	3
22	LW	Moncif Boutaoui	(Algeria)	9	3	1	0	0	0	0	0	0	0	0	0	9	3	1
24	LW	Mohamed Bouderbala	(Algeria)	18	9	1	5	1	2	0	0	0	8	1	1	31	11	4
27	LW	Houssam Ghacha	(Algeria)	20	19	2	4	4	4	1	1	0	11	11	3	36	35	9
29	ST	Dramane Kamagaté	(Ivory Coast)	6	4	0	3	1	1	1	1	0	10	8	0	20	14	1
46	LW	Ahmed Achouri	(Algeria)	2	0	0	0	0	0	0	0	0	–	–	–	2	0	0
Players transferred out during the season
~~18~~	DM	Salim Boukhanchouche	(Algeria)	4	4	0	0	0	0	0	0	0	1	1	0	5	5	0
~~15~~	ST	Emmanuel Ernest	(Liberia)	4	1	0	1	0	0	0	0	0	1	0	0	6	1	0
~~10~~	LW	Ghiles Guenaoui	(Algeria)	8	1	1	0	0	0	0	0	0	4	1	0	12	2	1
~~17~~	LW	Khaled Bousseliou	(Algeria)	6	1	1	0	0	0	0	0	0	1	0	0	7	1	1
~~31~~	RW	Diaa Eddine Mechid	(Algeria)	4	1	0	0	0	0	0	0	0	0	0	0	4	1	0
~~21~~	CB	Adem Alilet	(Algeria)	7	7	2	3	3	0	0	0	0	1	1	1	11	11	3
Total				30		34	6		12	1		0	14		16	51		62

Last updated: 6 June 2026
Source: soccerway.com

=== Disciplinary record ===
No.	Pos.	Player	Ligue 1			Algerian Cup			Super Cup			Confederation Cup			Total		
No.	Pos.	Player	Booked	(yellow card) (yellow-red card)	Sent off (straight red)	Booked	(yellow card) (yellow-red card)	Sent off (straight red)	Booked	(yellow card) (yellow-red card)	Sent off (straight red)	Booked	(yellow card) (yellow-red card)	Sent off (straight red)	Booked	(yellow card) (yellow-red card)	Sent off (straight red)
25	GK	(Algeria) Oussama Benbot	1	0	0	0	0	0	0	0	0	1	0	0	2	0	0
2	LB	(Algeria) Walid Kourdi	1	0	0	0	0	0	0	0	0	0	0	0	1	0	0
3	CB	(Algeria) Safieddine Atmania	1	0	0	0	0	0	0	0	0	0	0	0	1	0	0
4	CB	(Cameroon) Che Malone	2	1	0	0	1	0	0	0	0	1	0	0	4	1	0
5	CB	(Algeria) Imadeddine Azzi	3	0	0	0	0	0	0	0	0	0	0	0	3	0	0
12	RB	(Algeria) Haithem Loucif	3	0	0	1	0	0	0	0	0	2	0	0	6	0	0
13	CB	(Algeria) Hocine Dehiri	4	0	1	1	0	0	0	0	0	2	0	0	7	0	1
19	RB	(Algeria) Saâdi Radouani	4	0	0	0	0	0	0	0	0	1	0	0	5	0	0
20	RB	(Algeria) Rayane Mahrouz	4	0	0	0	0	0	0	0	0	0	0	0	4	0	0
23	LB	(Algeria) Ilyes Chetti	4	0	0	0	0	0	0	0	0	0	0	0	4	0	0
6	DM	(Algeria) Zakaria Draoui	3	0	0	0	0	0	1	0	0	2	0	0	6	0	0
8	AM	(Algeria) Islam Merili	5	0	0	2	0	0	1	0	0	2	0	0	10	0	0
11	AM	(Democratic Republic of the Congo) Glody Likonza	5	0	0	1	0	0	0	0	0	0	0	0	6	0	0
14	DM	(Algeria) Brahim Benzaza	4	0	0	2	0	0	0	0	0	0	0	0	6	0	0
26	DM	(Algeria) Zakaria Draoui	1	0	0	0	0	0	0	0	0	0	0	0	1	0	0
30	AM	(Senegal) Aimé Tendeng	1	0	0	0	0	0	0	0	0	2	0	0	3	0	0
7	RW	(Algeria) Ahmed Khaldi	1	0	0	2	0	0	0	0	0	2	0	0	5	0	0
24	LW	(Algeria) Mohamed Bouderbala	1	0	0	1	0	0	0	0	0	1	0	0	3	0	0
27	RW	(Algeria) Houssam Ghacha	3	1	0	1	0	0	0	0	0	0	0	0	4	1	0
Players transferred out during the season
~~18~~	DM	(Algeria) Salim Boukhanchouche	3	0	0	0	0	0	0	0	0	0	0	0	3	0	0
~~15~~	ST	(Liberia) Emmanuel Ernest	1	0	0	0	0	0	0	0	0	0	0	0	1	0	0
~~10~~	LW	(Algeria) Ghiles Guenaoui	1	0	0	0	0	0	0	0	0	0	0	0	1	0	0
~~17~~	LW	(Algeria) Khaled Bousseliou	1	1	0	0	0	0	0	0	0	0	0	0	1	1	0
~~21~~	CB	(Algeria) Adam Alilet	4	0	0	1	0	0	0	0	0	0	0	0	5	0	0
Total			61	3	1	13	0	0	2	0	0	16	0	0	92	3	1

=== Goalscorers ===
Includes all competitive matches.

No.	Nat.	Player	Pos.	L1	AC	SC	CC	TOTAL
7	(Algeria)	Ahmed Khaldi	RW	8	1	0	4	13
27	(Algeria)	Houssam Ghacha	LW	2	4	0	3	9
6	(Algeria)	Zakaria Draoui	DM	4	0	0	2	6
11	(Democratic Republic of the Congo)	Glody Likonza	AM	3	1	0	1	5
24	(Algeria)	Mohamed Bouderbala	LW	1	2	0	1	4
14	(Algeria)	Brahim Benzaza	DM	1	0	0	2	3
9	(Algeria)	Riad Benayad	ST	3	0	0	0	3
30	(Senegal)	Aimé Tendeng	AM	1	1	0	0	2
12	(Algeria)	Haithem Loucif	RB	1	1	0	0	2
19	(Algeria)	Saâdi Radouani	RB	0	1	0	1	2
20	(Algeria)	Rayane Mahrouz	RB	2	0	0	0	2
4	(Cameroon)	Che Malone	CB	0	0	0	1	1
13	(Algeria)	Hocine Dehiri	CB	1	0	0	0	1
29	(Ivory Coast)	Dramane Kamagaté	ST	0	1	0	0	1
33	(Algeria)	Issam Bayoud	RB	1	0	0	0	1
33	(Algeria)	Moncif Boutaoui	RW	1	0	0	0	1
23	(Algeria)	Ilyes Chetti	LB	1	0	0	0	1
Players transferred out during the season
~~10~~	(Algeria)	Ghiles Guenaoui	LW	1	0	0	0	1
~~17~~	(Algeria)	Khaled Bousseliou	LW	1	0	0	0	1
~~21~~	(Algeria)	Adem Alilet	CB	2	0	0	1	3
Own Goals				0	0	0	0	0
Totals				34	12	0	16	62

=== Assists ===
Includes all competitive matches.

No.	Nat.	Player	Pos.	L1	AC	SC	CC	TOTAL
27	(Algeria)	Houssam Ghacha	LW	5	0	0	2	7
8	(Algeria)	Islam Merili	AM	1	1	0	2	4
19	(Algeria)	Saâdi Radouani	RB	4	0	0	0	4
29	(Ivory Coast)	Dramane Kamagaté	ST	1	1	0	1	3
14	(Algeria)	Brahim Benzaza	DM	2	1	0	0	3
30	(Senegal)	Aimé Tendeng	AM	1	1	0	1	3
24	(Algeria)	Mohamed Bouderbala	LW	0	1	0	1	2
7	(Algeria)	Ahmed Khaldi	RW	0	2	0	0	2
9	(Algeria)	Riad Benayad	ST	1	0	0	1	2
6	(Algeria)	Zakaria Draoui	DM	1	0	0	1	2
11	(Democratic Republic of the Congo)	Glody Likonza	AM	2	0	0	0	2
23	(Algeria)	Ilyes Chetti	LB	2	0	0	0	2
20	(Algeria)	Rayane Mahrouz	RB	1	0	0	0	1
12	(Algeria)	Haithem Loucif	RB	0	1	0	0	1
13	(Algeria)	Hocine Dehiri	CB	0	1	0	0	1
28	(Algeria)	Achref Abada	CB	0	1	0	0	1
Players transferred out during the season
~~10~~	(Algeria)	Ghiles Guenaoui	LW	0	0	0	1	1
Totals				21	10	0	10	41

=== Penalties ===
Date	Nat.	Name	Opponent	Scored?
20 September 2025	(Algeria)	Brahim Benzaza	JS Saoura	Penalty missed
17 November 2025	(Algeria)	Houssam Ghacha	ES Mostaganem	Penalty scored
21 February 2026	(Algeria)	Houssam Ghacha	JS Saoura	Penalty scored
15 March 2026	(Algeria)	Ahmed Khaldi	Maniema Union	Penalty scored
19 April 2026	(Algeria)	Ahmed Khaldi	Olympic Safi	Penalty scored
9 May 2026	(Algeria)	Ahmed Khaldi	Zamalek	Penalty scored
12 May 2026	(Algeria)	Riad Benayad	ES Mostaganem	Penalty scored
12 May 2026	(Algeria)	Moncif Boutaoui	ES Mostaganem	Penalty missed
22 May 2026	(Algeria)	Riad Benayad	Paradou AC	Penalty missed
25 May 2026	(Algeria)	Zakaria Draoui	USM Khenchela	Penalty scored
2 June 2026	(Algeria)	Ahmed Khaldi	CR Belouizdad	Penalty scored

=== Clean sheets ===
Includes all competitive matches.

					Clean sheets				
No.	Nat	Name	GP	GA	L1	AC	SC	CC	Total
1	(Algeria)	Abdelmoumen Sifour	3	5	0	0	0	0	0
16	(Algeria)	Kamel Soufi	16	18	4	1	0	0	5
25	(Algeria)	Oussama Benbot	31	20	5	2	0	8	15
		TOTALS		43	9	3	0	8	20
