= 2026 CAF Super Cup =

TotalEnergies CAF Super Cup 2026
- Match programme cover
Mamelodi Sundowns	USM Alger
(South Africa)	(Algeria)
1	3
- Date: 8 November 2026
- Venue: Loftus Versfeld Stadium, Pretoria
- Referee: Dahane Beida (Mauritania)
- Attendance: 10,000

The 2026 CAF Super Cup,TotalEnergies CAF Super Cup 2026 for sponsorship reasons, was the 35th CAF Super Cup, an annual football match in Africa organized by the Confederation of African Football (CAF), between the winners of the previous season's two CAF club competitions, the CAF Champions League and the CAF Confederation Cup.

The match was played between the 2025–26 CAF Champions League winners, Mamelodi Sundowns, from South Africa, and the 2025–26 CAF Confederation Cup winners, USM Alger, from Algeria

USM Alger won the match 3–1, to secure their second CAF Super Cup title.

== Teams ==
Both Mamelodi Sundowns and USM Alger have won the CAF Super Cup once in their history. Mamelodi Sundowns won their first title in 2017 after defeating TP Mazembe. USM Alger won the title in 2023 after defeating Egyptian club Al Ahly, the reigning CAF Champions League winners. The two clubs have met only twice in their history, both encounters taking place in the group stage of the 2020 CAF Champions League. Mamelodi Sundowns won both matches, home and away.

Team	Zone	Previous finals appearances (bold indicates winners)
(South Africa) Mamelodi Sundowns	COSAFA (Southern Africa)	1 (**2017**)
(Algeria) USM Alger	UNAF (North Africa)	1 (**2023**)

== Format ==
The CAF Super Cup was played as a single match with the CAF Champions League winners as the host. If the score was tied at the end of regulation, extra time would not be played, and the penalty shoot-out would be used to determine the winner (CAF Champions League Regulations XXVII and CAF Confederation Cup Regulations XXV).

== Venue ==
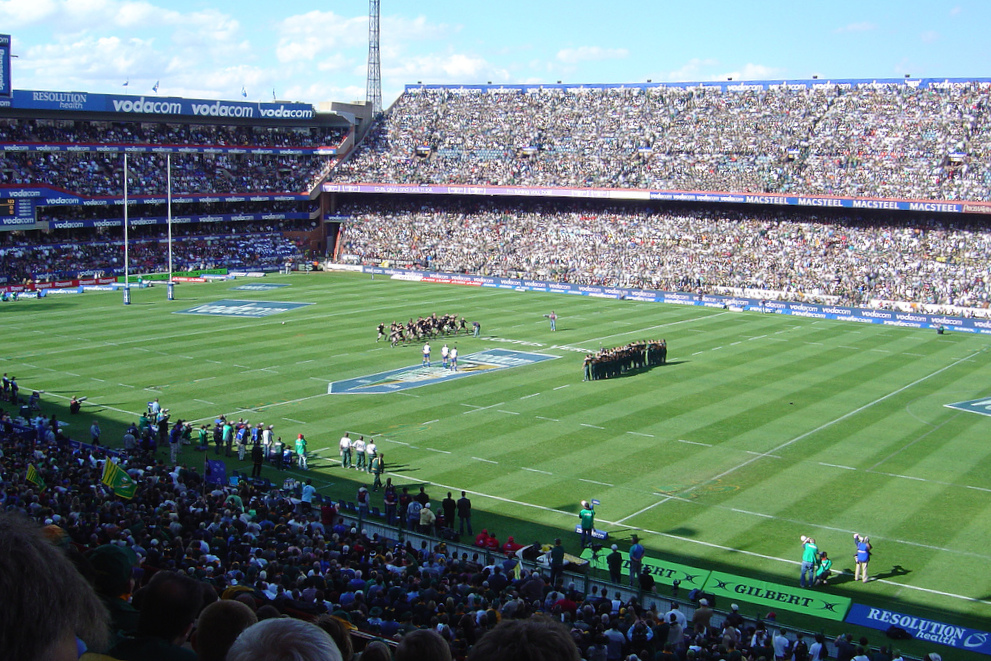
The Loftus Versfeld Stadium in Pretoria hosted the match.

The 2026 CAF Super Cup is scheduled to be played on 8 November 2026 at the Loftus Versfeld Stadium in Pretoria, South Africa. The match will be contested between Mamelodi Sundowns, winners of the CAF Champions League, and USM Alger, winners of the CAF Confederation Cup. The match will be played as a single fixture, with Mamelodi Sundowns serving as the host team. It will determine the winner of the 2026 CAF Super Cup and mark the opening fixture of the new CAF inter-club season.

== Match ==
=== Pre-match ===
The Confederation of African Football (CAF) has confirmed the organisational arrangements for the CAF Super Cup, scheduled for 8 November at 15:00 local time at Loftus Versfeld Stadium in Pretoria, South Africa. The measures cover security, accommodation, training facilities, ticketing and television production. USM Alger supporters will receive 5% of the stadium’s capacity, while the host club will retain all ticket revenue. The broadcast setup will feature 28 cameras, and both clubs must provide signed shirts and balls for promotional activities. The CAF has appointed Mauritanian referee Dahane Beida to officiate the match between Mamelodi Sundowns and USM Alger. The match is scheduled to take place on Sunday, 8 November, at Loftus Versfeld Stadium in Pretoria, South Africa, at 2:00 p.m. Dahane Beida will be assisted by Senegalese assistant referee Djibril Camara and Cameroonian assistant referee Elvis Guy Noupue Nguegoue. Mauritanian referee Abdel Aziz Bouh has been appointed as the fourth official. The Video assistant referee (VAR) team will be led by Mauritanian official Babacar Sarr, who will be assisted by Cameroonian referee Carine Atezambong Fomo and Sudanese official Abdalaziz Yasir Ahmed Abdalaziz.

=== Summary ===
8 November 2026
15:00 UTC+2

Mamelodi Sundowns (South Africa)	1–3	(Algeria) USM Alger
Rayners 25' (pen.)	Report	Draoui 4'; Radouani 37'; Khaldi 55'

Loftus Versfeld Stadium, Pretoria
Attendance: 10,000
Referee: Dahane Beida (Mauritania)

**Mamelodi Sundowns**	**USM Alger**

GK	30	(South Africa) Ronwen Williams (c)
DF	2	(South Africa) Malibongwe Khoza	(yellow card) 67'
DF	3	(South Africa) Khulumani Ndamane
DF	6	(South Africa) Aubrey Modiba		(substituted off) 84'
DF	22	(South Africa) Thabang Matuludi		(substituted off) 84'
MF	4	(South Africa) Teboho Mokoena
MF	11	(Chile) Marcelo Allende
MF	27	(South Africa) Thapelo Morena		(substituted off) 46'
FW	33	(South Africa) Cassius Mailula		(substituted off) 58'
FW	17	(South Africa) Tashreeq Matthews
FW	12	(Colombia) Brayan León		(substituted off) 17'
Substitutes:
GK	31	(South Africa) Ricardo Goss
DF	23	(South Africa) Fawaaz Basadien		(substituted on) 84'
DF	40	(South Africa) Mothobi Mvala
MF	15	(South Africa) Bathusi Aubaas
MF	38	(South Africa) Siyanda Ndlovu		(substituted on) 46'
MF	18	(South Africa) Themba Zwane		(substituted on) 84'
MF	29	(South Africa) Antonio van Wyk		(substituted on) 58'
FW	13	(South Africa) Iqraam Rayners		(substituted on) 17'
Manager:
(Portugal) Miguel Cardoso

GK	30	(Algeria) Oussama Benbot
CB	5	(Algeria) Imadeddine Azzi
CB	28	(Algeria) Achref Abada
RB	19	(Algeria) Saâdi Radouani (c)	(yellow card) 88'
LB	20	(Algeria) Rayane Mahrouz
DM	6	(Algeria) Zakaria Draoui		(substituted off) 83'
DM	12	(Algeria) Haithem Loucif
AM	11	(Democratic Republic of the Congo) Glody Likonza
AM	9	(Algeria) Farid Boulaya		(substituted off) 46'
ST	7	(Algeria) Ahmed Khaldi		(substituted off) 88'
ST	15	(Algeria) Mohamed Ramdaoui	(yellow card) 60'	(substituted off) 70'
Substitutes:
GK	16	(Algeria) Mohamed Idir Hadid
CB	4	(Cameroon) Che Malone		(substituted on) 83'
LB	23	(Algeria) Ilyes Chetti
DM	8	(Algeria) Raouf Benguit
DM	10	(Algeria) Dhirar Bensaadallah
CM	14	(Algeria) Salaheddine Bouziani
AM	17	(Senegal) Aimé Tendeng		(substituted on) 46'
LW	26	(Algeria) Ghiles Guenaoui		(substituted on) 88'
ST	29	(Ivory Coast) Dramane Kamagaté		(substituted on) 70'
Manager :
(Senegal) Lamine N'Diaye

Assistant referees:
Djibril Camara (Senegal)
Elvis Noupoue (Cameroon)
Fourth official:
Abdelaziz Bouh (Mauritania)
Video assistant referee:
Babacar Sarr (Mauritania)
Assistant video assistant referees:
Carine Atezambong Fomo (Cameroon)
Abdalaziz Yasir Ahmed Abdalaziz (Sudan)

**Match rules**
- 90 minutes.
- Penalty shoot-out if scores level.
- Nine named substitutes, of which up to five may be used. (Note: Each team was only given three opportunities to make substitutions, excluding substitutions made at half-time.)

=== Statistics ===
First half
Statistic	Mamelodi Sundowns	USM Alger
Goals scored	0	0
Total shots	0	0
Shots on target	0	0
Saves	0	0
Ball possession	0%	0%
Corner kicks	0	0
Offsides	0	0
Yellow cards	0	0
Red cards	0	0

Second half
Statistic	Mamelodi Sundowns	USM Alger
Goals scored	0	0
Total shots	0	0
Shots on target	0	0
Saves	0	0
Ball possession	0%	0%
Corner kicks	0	0
Offsides	0	0
Yellow cards	0	0
Red cards	0	0

Overall
Statistic	Mamelodi Sundowns	USM Alger
Goals scored	0	0
Total shots	0	0
Shots on target	0	0
Saves	0	0
Ball possession	0%	0%
Corner kicks	0	0
Offsides	0	0
Yellow cards	0	0
Red cards	0	0
