= Haithem Loucif =

Algerian footballer (born 1996)

Personal information
- Date of birth: 8 July 1996 (age 30)
- Place of birth: Batna, Algeria
- Height: 1.78 m (5 ft 10 in)
- Position: Right back

Team information
- Current team: USM Alger
- Number: 12

Senior career*
Years	Team	Apps	(Gls)
2018–2019	Paradou AC	36	(3)
2019–2021	Angers B	14	(0)
2021–2023	USM Alger	40	(1)
2023–2025	Yverdon-Sport	20	(0)
2024	→ Lausanne-Sport (loan)	10	(1)
2025–	USM Alger	29	(1)

International career^{‡}
2018	Algeria U23	1	(0)
2018–	Algeria	3	(0)
2021–	Algeria A'	2	(0)
- * Club domestic league appearances and goals as of 6 June 2026 ‡ National team caps and goals as of 28 August 2023

Haithem Loucif (Arabic: هيثم لوصيف; born 8 July 1996) is an Algerian professional footballer who plays as a right-back for USM Alger.

== Club career ==
Loucif made his professional debut with Paradou AC in a 1–0 Algerian Ligue Professionnelle 1 loss to USM Bel-Abbès on 15 March 2018.

=== Angers ===
In 2019, Loucif Joined Angers.

=== USM Alger ===
On 31 January 2021, Haithem Loucif return to Algeria through the gate of USM Alger and signed a two-and-a-half-year contract after terminating his contract with Angers. On 3 June 2023, Loucif won the first title in his football career by winning the 2022–23 CAF Confederation Cup after defeating Young Africans of Tanzania.

=== Yverdon-Sport ===
On 16 August 2023, Loucif joined the newly promoted club in the Swiss Super League Yverdon-Sport for three seasons.

On 8 February 2024, Loucif was loaned by Lausanne-Sport.

== International career ==
Loucif made his debut for Algeria in a friendly match against Qatar in December 2018. On 2 January 2023, Loucif was selected for the 28-man squad to participate in the 2022 African Nations Championship. Loucif reaching the final settling for runner-up after the defeat against Senegal.

== Career statistics ==
=== Club ===
As of 14 June 2026

Club	Season	League			Cup		Continental		Other		Total	
Club	Season	Division	Apps	Goals	Apps	Goals	Apps	Goals	Apps	Goals	Apps	Goals
USM Alger	2020–21	Ligue 1	6	0	—		—		1 (Note: All appearances in Algerian League Cup)	0	7	0
USM Alger	2021–22	Ligue 1	22	0	—		—		—		22	0
USM Alger	2022–23	Ligue 1	12	1	—		12 (Note: All appearance(s) in CAF Confederation Cup)	0	—		24	1
Total			40	1	—		12	0	1	0	53	1
Yverdon-Sport	2023–24	Swiss Super League	15	0	1	0	—		—		16	0
USM Alger	2024–25	Ligue 1	6	0	4	0	2	0	—		12	0
USM Alger	2025–26	Ligue 1	23	1	4	1	14	0	1 (Note: All appearances in Algerian Super Cup)	0	42	2
USM Alger	2026–27	Ligue 1	0	0	0	0	0	0	0	0	0	0
USM Alger	Total		29	1	8	1	16	0	1	0	54	2
Career total			0	0	0	0	0	0	0	0	0	0

== Honours ==
USM Alger

- Algerian Cup: 2024–25, 2025–26
- CAF Confederation Cup: 2022–23,2025–26
- CAF Super Cup: 2026
