= Glody Likonza =

Congolese professional footballer

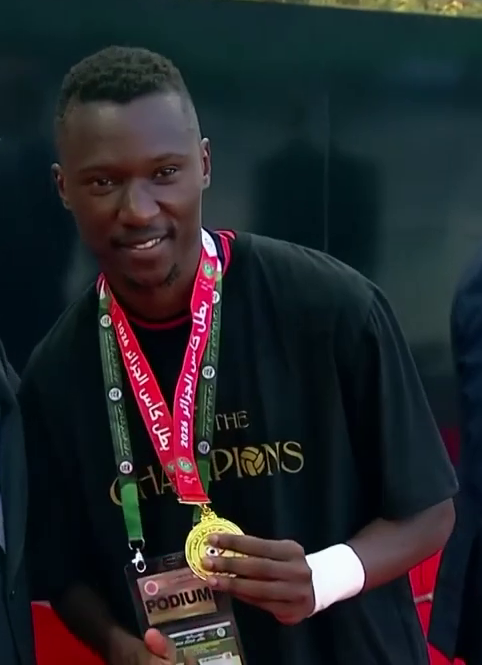
- Glody Likonza in the final of the 2025–26 Algerian Cup

Personal information
- Date of birth: 10 May 1998 (age 28)
- Place of birth: Kinshasa, DR Congo
- Height: 1.79 m (5 ft 10 in)
- Position: Attacking midfielder

Team information
- Current team: USM Alger
- Number: 11

Senior career*
Years	Team	Apps	(Gls)
2017–2024	TP Mazembe	110	(12)
2021–2022	→ Standard Liège (loan)	0	(0)
2024–	USM Alger	56	(4)

International career^{‡}
2019	DR Congo	2	(0)
- * Club domestic league appearances and goals as of 6 June 2026 ‡ National team caps and goals as of 23:18, 04 November 2026 (UTC)

Glody Likonza (born 10 May 1998) is a Congolese professional footballer who plays as an attacking midfielder for Algerian Ligue Professionnelle 1 club USM Alger and the DR Congo national team.

== Professional career ==
Likonza began his senior career with the Congolese club Mazembe in the Linafoot. He joined the Belgian club Standard Liège on a one-year loan with option to buy on 30 August 2021. On 31 January 2022, the loan was terminated early without him making any appearances for Standard.

=== USM Alger ===
On July 23, 2024, USM Alger announced the recruitment of Glody Likonza who has signed for a period of three seasons. The Egyptian Zamalek SC and the Club Africain of Tunis tried to offer the services of the vice-captain of TP Mazembe, but the USMA was quicker in materializing with Likonza, while he was expected in Tunis to finalize his contract with the most popular club in Tunisia. In his first season with his new club, Likonza delivered impressive performances that established him as a regular starter in most matches throughout the campaign. The Congolese midfielder scored his first goal Ligue 1 on 18 February 2025 against NC Magra. In the Algerian Cup, Likonza played an important role in USM Alger's journey toward the title. Although he featured as a substitute in the final for tactical reasons, he still helped the club secure the trophy, winning his first title with USM Alger and ending his debut season on a positive note.

In his second season with USM Alger, Likonza saw his role within the team decline, going from a regular starter to a substitute following the arrival of coach Abdelhak Benchikha. Even after Benchikha's departure and the appointment of Senegalese manager Lamine N'Diaye, his situation changed little, as he continued to feature mostly from the bench. Despite this, Likonza still managed to add another trophy to his record, winning the Algerian Cup after victory over CR Belouizdad in the final, where he appeared as a substitute. His most memorable contribution, however, came in the CAF Confederation Cup final against Zamalek In the second leg at Cairo International Stadium, Likonza converted the decisive penalty in the shootout, sealing USM Alger's second continental title.

== Career statistics ==
=== Club ===
As of 31 October 2026

Club	Season	League			Cup		Continental		Other		Total	
Club	Season	Division	Apps	Goals	Apps	Goals	Apps	Goals	Apps	Goals	Apps	Goals
TP Mazembe	2017–18	Linafoot	0	0	0	0	2 (Note: All appearance(s) in Champions League)	0	—		2	0
TP Mazembe	2018–19	Linafoot	0	0	0	0	10	0	—		10	0
TP Mazembe	2019–20	Linafoot	0	0	0	0	10	0	—		10	0
TP Mazembe	2020–21	Linafoot	0	0	0	0	—		—		0	0
TP Mazembe	2021–22	Linafoot	0	0	0	0	8 (Note: All appearance(s) in CAF Confederation Cup)	1	—		8	1
TP Mazembe	2022–23	Linafoot	0	0	0	0	8 (Note: 6 appearances in CAF Confederation Cup, 2 appearances in CAF Champions League)	0	—		8	0
TP Mazembe	2023–24	Linafoot	0	0	0	0	14 (Note: 2 appearances in African Football League, 12 appearances and 3 goals in CAF Champions League)	3	—		14	3
TP Mazembe	Total		110	12	0	0	52	4	—		162	16
USM Alger	2024–25	Ligue 1	26	1	4	0	10	0	—		40	1
USM Alger	2025–26	Ligue 1	24	3	6	1	14	1	1 (Note: All appearances in Algerian Super Cup)	0	45	5
USM Alger	2026–27	Ligue 1	7	0	0	0	0	0	0	0	7	0
USM Alger	Total		57	4	10	1	24	1	1	0	92	6
Career total			167	16	0	0	54	4	1	0	222	20

== International career ==
Likonza made his debut with the DR Congo national team in a 3–2 friendly loss to Rwanda on 18 September 2019.

== Honours ==
TP Mazembe

- Linafoot: 2018–19, 2019–20, 2021–22, 2023–24

USM Alger

- Algerian Cup: 2024–25, 2025–26
- CAF Confederation Cup: 2025–26
- CAF Super Cup: 2026
