= Che Malone =

Cameroonian professional footballer

Personal information
- Full name: Che Malone Fondoh Junior
- Date of birth: 23 May 1999 (age 27)
- Place of birth: Bafut, Cameroon
- Height: 1.81 m (5 ft 11 in)
- Position: Centre-back

Team information
- Current team: USM Alger
- Number: 4

Senior career*
Years	Team	Apps	(Gls)
2021–2023	Coton Sport	0	(0)
2023–2025	Simba	0	(0)
2025–	USM Alger	19	(0)

International career^{‡}
2022–	Cameroon	8	(0)
- * Club domestic league appearances and goals as of 6 June 2026 ‡ National team caps and goals as of 27 March 2026

Che Malone Fondoh Junior (born 16 September 1999) is a Cameroonian professional footballer who plays as a centre-back for Ligue 1 club USM Alger and the Cameroon national team.

== Career ==
Che Malone was born in Bafut, where he developed his passion for football under the care of his grandmother. Malone took part in university and school competitions before joining Union Sportif in Douala. He later moved to Cotonsport Garoua, one of the most prominent clubs in Cameroon. Malone joined Coton Sport and won the MTN Elite One championship twice with the club. His performances established him as one of the most promising defenders in the domestic league. In July 2023, he transferred to Simba in Tanzania for a reported fee of around 78 million CFA francs (≈ US$130,000), making him one of the most expensive defenders to leave Coton Sport in the past decade. Since joining Simba, Malone became a regular starter and wore the number 20 shirt.

=== USM Alger ===
On 9 December 2025, Che Malone officially signed a two-year contract with USM Alger. Malone had arrived in Algiers a week earlier, where he was welcomed at the airport by his compatriot and former USM Alger defender, Daniel Moncharé. After successfully completing his medical examination, negotiations continued in order to settle the final details of the deal. USM Alger reached an agreement with Simba, the Tanzanian club to which he was still contracted, for a transfer fee estimated at €200,000. Simba also secured a 15% sell-on clause for any future transfer of the player. Malone agreed to a monthly salary of €10,000 as part of his contract with the Algerian club.

During his first season with USM Alger, Malone established himself as one of the team's key players thanks to his performances in domestic and continental competitions. His strong displays earned him a call-up to the Cameroon national team squad for the 2025 Africa Cup of Nations. At the end of the season, Malone won his first title with the club after defeated CR Belouizdad in the 2025–26 Algerian Cup, although he featured as a substitute in the final for tactical reasons.

== International career ==
I was very surprised when I was told that I would start. But it was also one of my personal goals. I did not come here just to accompany the others, but to work hard and earn my place. When the opportunity came, I wanted to show the best version of myself. I come from a humble background, but I never gave up. Hard work, discipline, and faith brought me this far. Discipline has always been the key. Without it, I would never have reached this level. But this is not the end goal it is only the beginning of a new story.

— Che Malone's statement about his first match in the Africa Cup of Nations.

Che Malone has been called up to replace Jean-Charles Castelletto ahead of AFCON. The Cameroonian defender will join the Lions for their preparation camp in Morocco. For Che Malone, it is an opportunity to perform on the continental stage.

Che Malone was inspired by Nicolas Nkoulou and Rigobert Song.

== Career statistics ==
=== Club ===
As of 4 September 2026

Club	Season	League			Cup		Continental		Other		Total	
Club	Season	Division	Apps	Goals	Apps	Goals	Apps	Goals	Apps	Goals	Apps	Goals
Coton Sport	2021–22	Elite One	—		—		—		—		—	
Coton Sport	2022–23	Elite One	—		—		6 (Note: All appearance(s) in Champions League)	0	—		6	0
Coton Sport	Total		—		—		6	0	—		6	0
Simba	2023–24	NBC Premier League	—		—		8	0	—		8	0
Simba	2024–25	NBC Premier League	—		—		9 (Note: All appearance(s) in CAF Confederation Cup)	0	—		9	0
Simba	Total		—		—		17	0	—		17	0
USM Alger	2025–26	Ligue 1	19	0	5	0	14	1	1 (Note: All appearances in Algerian Super Cup)	1	39	1
USM Alger	2026–27	Ligue 1	1	0	0	0	0	0	0	0	1	0
USM Alger	Total		19	0	5	0	14	0	1	0	39	1
Career total			19	0	5	0	31	1	1	0	62	1

=== International ===
As of match played 27 March 2026

Appearances and goals by national team and year
National team	Year	Apps	Goals
Cameroon	2022	1	0
Cameroon	2023	2	0
Cameroon	2025	2	0
Cameroon	2026	3	0
Total		8	0

== Honours ==
Coton Sport

- Elite One: 2021–22, 2022–23

USM Alger

- Algerian Cup: 2025–26
- CAF Confederation Cup: 2025–26
- CAF Super Cup: 2026
