= Oussama Benbot =

Algerian footballer (born 1994)

Personal information
- Date of birth: 11 October 1994 (age 32)
- Place of birth: Aïn M'lila, Algeria
- Height: 1.88 m (6 ft 2 in)
- Position: Goalkeeper

Team information
- Current team: USM Alger
- Number: 30

Youth career
- –2014: AS Aïn M'lila

Senior career*
Years	Team	Apps	(Gls)
2014–2016	US Chaouia	32	(0)
2016	USM Bel Abbès	1	(0)
2017	DRB Tadjenanet	1	(0)
2017–2018	AS Aïn M'lila	16	(0)
2018–2021	JS Kabylie	54	(0)
2021–	USM Alger	96	(0)

International career^{‡}
2023–	Algeria	4	(0)
- * Club domestic league appearances and goals as of 6 June 2026 (UTC) ‡ National team caps and goals as of 27 June 2026 (UTC)

Oussama Benbot (Arabic: أُسَامَة بن بُوط; born 11 October 1994) is an Algerian professional footballer who plays as a goalkeeper for USM Alger in the Algerian Ligue Professionnelle 1 and the Algeria national team.

== Club career ==
In 2018, Benbot signed a contract with JS Kabylie.

=== USM Alger ===
On 14 August 2021, Oussama Benbot joined USM Alger after the expiration of his contract with JS Kabylie on 25 July. Having failed to reach an agreement with the club's management, led at the time by Cherif Mellal, Benbot opted for a new challenge. Convinced by USM Alger's sporting project, Benbot signed for the Red and Blacks with the ambition of adding to his trophy collection and contributing to the club's future success. On June 3, 2023, Benbot won the first international title in his football career by winning the 2022–23 CAF Confederation Cup after defeating Young Africans of Tanzania. On 16 August 2023, he extended his contract until 2026.

Oussama Benbot was part of USM Alger's squad during their successful 2024–25 Algerian Cup campaign, in which the club defeated CR Belouizdad 2–0 in the final to lift the trophy. He was a regular starter throughout the competition and kept a clean sheet, conceding no goals. In the following season, Benbot played an even more prominent role in the team's Algerian Cup campaign. He captained USM Alger in the final against the same opponents, leading his side to a 2–1 victory and the club's tenth Algerian Cup title.

On the CAF Confederation Cup stage, Benbot played a decisive role in guiding USM Alger to the final. The goalkeeper produced a series of crucial saves throughout the knockout rounds, including an important performance in the semi-final against Olympic Safi that helped his side secure qualification for the final. In the first leg against Zamalek, Benbot kept a clean sheet in a 1–0 victory. In the second leg, he was instrumental during the penalty shootout, making key saves as USM Alger claimed the CAF Confederation Cup title, marking the third continental title of Benbot's career.

On 23 August 2026, USM Alger extended Oussama Benbot's contract for three additional seasons as part of the club's efforts to retain key players and maintain squad stability, keeping him at the club until 2030.

== International career ==
On 30 May 2023, the FAF publish the list of Djamel Belmadi for the two matches of the month of June, Where is called Oussama Benbot for the first time. On 29 December 2023, Benbot was named by Djamel Belmadi to Algeria's 26-man squad for the 2023 Africa Cup of Nations.

Following Algeria's elimination from the 2025 Africa Cup of Nations, Oussama Benbot announced his retirement from international football in a letter addressed to Algerian Football Federation president Walid Sadi. The 31-year-old USM Alger goalkeeper, who was included in the squad but did not play a single minute during the tournament, said he had decided to step aside and make way for the next generation. In his message, Benbot expressed his pride in representing Algeria and thanked the federation, the coaching staff, and his teammates for their support throughout his international career.

Several months after announcing his international retirement, Benbot reversed his decision. In an interview with the Algerian Football Federation's (FAF) official website, the USM Alger goalkeeper admitted that he had acted on emotion and felt he had "rushed" his decision. Benbot also revealed that he held discussions with the FAF president and the Algeria national team head coach. These talks helped ease tensions and paved the way for his return to the national team in a more positive and harmonious atmosphere.

On 31 May 2026, Benbot was named in Vladimir Petković's 26-man Algeria squad for the 2026 FIFA World Cup. Benbot was handed his first competitive start for Algeria in the decisive group-stage match against Austria. However, the USM Alger goalkeeper endured a difficult performance, conceding three goals and drawing criticism for his positioning on the opening goal scored by Marko Arnautović. His display raised further doubts about his ability to establish himself as Algeria's first-choice goalkeeper. It proved to be his only appearance at the tournament, as he returned to the bench for the remainder of Algeria's World Cup campaign.

== Career statistics ==
=== Club ===
As of 30 April 2026

Appearances and goals by club, season and competition
Club	Season	League			National cup		Continental		Other		Total	
Club	Season	Division	Apps	Goals	Apps	Goals	Apps	Goals	Apps	Goals	Apps	Goals
JS Kabylie	2018–19	Ligue 1	2	0	—		—		—		2	0
JS Kabylie	2019–20	Ligue 1	18	0	1	0	9 (Note: All appearance(s) in Champions League)	0	—		28	0
JS Kabylie	2020–21	Ligue 1	23	0	—		13 (Note: All appearance(s) in CAF Confederation Cup)	0	4 (Note: All appearance(s) in League Cup)	0	40	0
JS Kabylie	Total		43	0	1	0	22	0	4	0	70	0
USM Alger	2021–22	Ligue 1	19	0	—		—		—		19	0
USM Alger	2022–23	Ligue 1	24	0	—		16	0	—		40	0
USM Alger	2023–24	Ligue 1	14	0	2	0	11 (Note: 1 appearance in CAF Super Cup, 10 appearances in CAF Confederation Cup)	0	—		27	0
USM Alger	2024–25	Ligue 1	25	0	5	0	9	0	—		39	0
USM Alger	2025–26	Ligue 1	14	0	4	0	11	0	1 (Note: All appearances in Algerian Super Cup)	0	30	0
USM Alger	2026–27	Ligue 1	0	0	0	0	0	0	0	0	0	0
USM Alger	Total		96	0	11	0	47	0	1	0	155	0
Career total			0	0	0	0	0	0	0	0	0	0

== Honours ==
JS Kabylie

- Algerian League Cup: 2020–21

USM Alger

- Algerian Cup: 2024–25, 2025–26
- CAF Confederation Cup: 2022–23,2025–26
- CAF Super Cup: 2023,2026
