= Aimé Tendeng =

Senegalese footballer (born 2001)

Personal information
- Full name: Etane Junior Aimé Tendeng
- Date of birth: 1 January 2001 (age 25)
- Place of birth: Enampore, Senegal
- Height: 1.80 m (5 ft 11 in)
- Position: Attacking midfielder

Team information
- Current team: USM Alger
- Number: 17

Youth career
- Casa Sports

Senior career*
Years	Team	Apps	(Gls)
–2023	Casa Sports	0	(0)
2023–2024	ASC Jaraaf	0	(0)
2024–2025	Al Hilal	0	(0)
2025–	USM Alger	24	(1)
- * Club domestic league appearances and goals as of 6 June 2026

Aimé Tendeng (born 1 January 2001) s a Senegalese professional footballer who plays as a Attacking midfielder for Algerian Ligue Professionnelle 1 club USM Alger.

== Career ==
Aimé Tendeng was developed in Senegal, where he began his football journey at Casa Sports. At this stage, he was trained as a midfielder and gradually built a reputation for his technical ability, vision, and versatility. During his time at Casa Sports, he achieved early success by winning: one Senegal league title and two Senegal Cup trophies. These achievements helped establish him as one of the promising young talents in Senegalese football. After his breakthrough at Casa Sports, Tendeng moved to ASC Jaraaf on 14 November 2023, one of the biggest clubs in Senegal. ASC Jaraaf, he continued his development and became one of the standout midfielders in the national championship. His performances in the domestic league made him one of the best players in the country in recent seasons. On 15 June 2024, his career took a major step forward when he signed a four-year contract with Al Hilal, one of the strongest clubs in African football.

=== USM Alger ===
On 29 August 2025, Etane Junior Aimé Tendeng, signed a three-season contract with USM Alger. Tendeng joins the Algerian club from Sudanese side Al Hilal. The Red and Black are counting on Tendeng to strengthen their midfield and bring added quality and creativity to the team for the 2025–26 season. On 24 April 2026, after delivering an outstanding performance in the Algerian Cup semi-final against CA Batna and scoring the opening goal, Aimé Tendeng suffered an ankle injury that forced him to leave the pitch. Despite the setback, Tendeng later resumed training with USM Alger while following a specially tailored rehabilitation program in preparation for the Algerian Cup final. Tendeng went on to feature in the final, which ended in victory for his team, allowing him to secure his first title with the club.

On 9 May 2026, USM Alger defeated Zamalek 1-0 in the first leg of the 2026 CAF Confederation Cup final thanks to a dramatic stoppage time penalty from Ahmed Khaldi. Aimé Tendeng delivered an important midfield performance, helping USM Alger dominate possession and sustain pressure throughout the match. On 16 May 2026, Aimé Tendeng won the CAF Confederation Cup with USM Alger after a dramatic second-leg final against Zamalek. After securing a 1-0 victory in the first leg. With the aggregate score tied at 1-1 after 90 minutes, the title was decided by a penalty shootout. More composed from the spot, Aimé Tendeng and his teammates won 8-7 on penalties, giving Tendeng their first CAF Confederation Cup title. Aimé Tendeng delivered a standout performance in the final, further confirming his importance in the USM Alger midfield. He was highly influential in controlling the game, showing strong presence in duels and accuracy in distribution. His display caught the attention of a wider audience beyond USM Alger supporters, including some Al Ahly fans who reportedly praised his performance and suggested their club should consider signing him.

== Career statistics ==
As of 6 June 2026

Club	Season	League			Cup		Continental		Other		Total	
Club	Season	Division	Apps	Goals	Apps	Goals	Apps	Goals	Apps	Goals	Apps	Goals
Al Hilal	2024–25 (Note: Al Hilal placed first on the table but shared the title as they contested as a foreign guest club.)	Super D1	0	0	0	0	7 (Note: All appearance(s) in Champions League)	0	—		7	0
USM Alger	2025–26	Ligue 1	24	1	6	1	13 (Note: All appearance(s) in CAF Confederation Cup)	0	1 (Note: All appearances in Algerian Super Cup)	0	44	2
USM Alger	2026–27	Ligue 1	0	0	0	0	0	0	0	0	0	0
USM Alger	Total		0	0	0	0	0	0	0	0	0	0
Career total			24	1	6	1	21	0	0	0	51	2

== Honours ==
Casa Sports

- Ligue 1: 2021–22
- Senegal FA Cup: 2021, 2022

USM Alger

- Algerian Cup: 2025–26
- CAF Confederation Cup: 2025–26
- CAF Super Cup: 2026
