= 2025–26 MC Alger season =

MC Alger
2025–26 season
- Owner: Sonatrach
- President: Mohamed Hakim Hadj Redjem
- Head coach: Rhulani Mokwena (from 21 July 2025) (until 14 March 2026); Khaled Ben Yahia (from 15 March 2026)
- Stadium: Ali La Pointe Stadium
- Ligue 1: 1st
- Algerian Cup: Quarter-finals
- Super Cup: Winners
- Confederation Cup: Group stage
- Top goalscorer: League: Mohamed Saliou Bangoura (10 goals); All: Mohamed Saliou Bangoura (11 goals)
- Average home league attendance: 34,217
- Biggest win: ES Mostaganem 0–5 MC Alger
- Biggest defeat: Mamelodi Sundowns 2–0 MC Alger
Home colours	Away colours	Third colours

The 2025–26 season, was MC Alger's 57th season and the club's 22nd consecutive season in the top flight of Algerian football. In addition to the domestic league, MC Alger participated in the Algerian Cup, Super Cup and the Champions League. The Algerian Professional Football League (LFP) officially released the calendar for the 2025–26 Ligue 1 Mobilis season on July 10, 2025.

== Review ==
=== Background ===
On July 13, 2025, MC Alger has officially signed a partnership with Chinese sportswear brand PEAK. The signing ceremony took place at the Zéralda training center. The contract spans three seasons and was attended by club president Hadj Redjem. PEAK replaces PUMA, which had been MCA’s kit supplier for the past six years. Already partnered with Chinese brand Hisense, MCA strengthens its Asian ties. Primarily known in basketball, PEAK now aims to grow its presence in football.

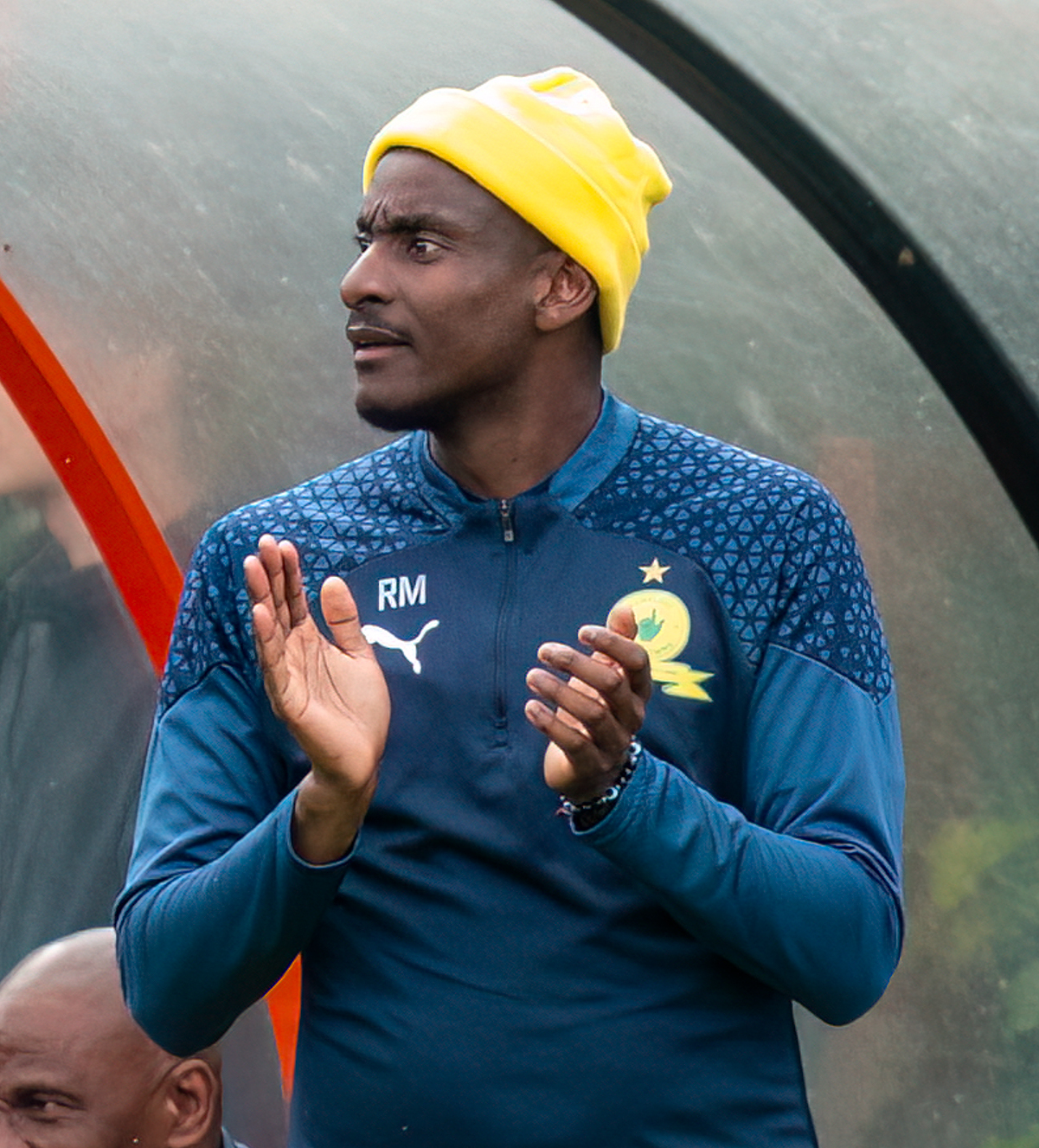
Rhulani Mokwena, the New MC Alger Head Coach.

On July 21, 2025, Mouloudia d’Alger officially introduced its new head coach, South African Rulani Mokwena, during a press conference in Zéralda, the former Mamelodi Sundowns and Wydad Casablanca coach succeeds Khaled Ben Yahia. Mokwena expressed strong ambitions: to keep MCA at the top domestically and push for greater success in the CAF Champions League. Mokwena praised the team’s quality and the competitiveness of Algerian football. Regarding the transfer window, he assured fans that reinforcements are coming. When asked about Youcef Belaïli, he called him an exceptional player but remained cautious out of respect for his current contract.

On July 23, 2025, MC Alger was shaken by the injury of its Guinean striker Mohamed Saliou Bangoura, which occurred during a training session. He sustained an injury to his left ankle and had to be rushed to a hospital for medical examinations. The club’s doctor confirmed the severity of the injury, stating that surgical intervention will be necessary. Bangoura will be sidelined for three months, although his condition does not raise long-term concerns. On the same day, the management of MC Alger announced the appointment of former defender Sid Ahmed Khedis as the club’s new manager. Khedis signed his contract with Le Doyen, the club with which he won the Ligue 1 title during the 2009–10 season. According to the club’s official statement, Khedis will be in charge of all sporting matters related to the first team.

On July 31, 2025, the Public Prosecutor of Bir Mourad Raïs announced the opening of a criminal investigation into the death of four MC Alger supporters who fell from the stands at the Stade du 5 Juillet on June 21. The charges involve negligence and failure to follow safety rules, based on Articles 288 and 289 of the Penal Code. The investigation, conducted by judicial police and a ministerial commission, aims to identify those responsible. Authorities pledged strict action against anyone found directly or indirectly involved.

==== First-team transfers (summer transfer window) ====
Fresh off their Ligue 1 triumph and following the official appointment of their new technical staff, the reigning back to back Ligue 1 champions have kicked off their summer transfer window with a first signing. On July 14, 2025, the club announced the signing of right back Aimen Bouguerra. The former CS Constantine player has signed a three-year deal. Bouguerra arrives to strengthen the right side of the defense, replacing Kamel Hamidi, who was released during the offseason. Bouguerra will compete for the starting spot with current first choice Réda Halaïmia. During the 2025 summer transfer window, MC Alger initiated a series of player releases as part of a squad overhaul. On July 21, 2025, the club announced the termination of goalkeeper Seïf Eddine Belkhir’s contract, making him the sixth player to leave since the start of the off season. The recorded departures are as follows: Romaric Ouattara, Serge Anthony, Wael Bouzekri, Mehdi Boussaïd, Kheireddine Merzougui and Seïf Eddine Belkhir.

On 5 August 2025, MC Alger officially announced the signing of Alexis Guendouz. The international goalkeeper, who was a free agent following his departure from Persepolis, signed a two year contract with the capital club. After previously playing for USM Alger and CR Belouizdad, Guendouz continues his journey in Algiers by joining MCA. His arrival is part of the club’s ambitious reinforcement strategy for the upcoming season. Recognizing the importance of a reliable last line of defense, the club management had explored several options in recent weeks before reaching an agreement with Guendouz.

== Squad list ==
Players and squad numbers last updated on 31 January 2026.
Note: Flags indicate national team as has been defined under FIFA eligibility rules. Players may hold more than one non-FIFA nationality.

No.	Nat.	Name	Position	Date of birth (age)	Signed from	Signed in	Contract ends	Transfer fees	Apps	Goals
Goalkeepers
1	(Algeria)	Abdelatif Ramdane	GK	19 May 2001 (aged 24)	(Algeria) JS Kabylie	2022	2025	Free transfer	45	0
26	(Algeria)	Alexis Guendouz	GK	26 January 1996 (aged 29)	(Iran) Persepolis	2025	2027	Free transfer	0	0
40	(Algeria)	Mastias Hammache	GK	25 November 2006 (aged 18)	(Canada) CF Montréal U23	2025	2029	Free transfer	0	0
Defenders
2	(Algeria)	Rostom Dendaoui	CB	29 June 2005 (aged 20)	(Algeria) Reserve team	2025	2028	Academy Player	0	0
3	(Algeria)	Marwane Khelif	LB	8 February 2000 (aged 25)	(Algeria) JS Saoura	2024	2028	Undisclosed	26	0
5	(Algeria)	Ayoub Abdellaoui (C.)	CB	16 February 1993 (aged 32)	(Saudi Arabia) Ettifaq FC	2022	2026	Free transfer	94	7
19	(Algeria)	Ayoub Ghezala	CB	December 6, 1995 (aged 29)	(Algeria) USM Annaba	2021	2026		122	3
20	(Algeria)	Réda Halaïmia	RB	August 28, 1996 (aged 28)	(Belgium) Beerschot	2022	2026	Free transfer	102	6
25	(Algeria)	Aimen Bouguerra	RB	January 10, 1997 (aged 28)	(Algeria) CS Constantine	2025	2028	Free transfer	0	0
27	(Algeria)	Abdelkader Menezla	CB	January 6, 2001 (aged 24)	(Algeria) USM Bel Abbès	2022	2026		42	2
Midfielders
6	(Algeria)	Mohamed Benkhemassa	DM	28 June 1993 (aged 32)	(Egypt) Ismaily SC	2023	2027	Free transfer	77	2
10	(Guinea)	Alhassane Bangoura	CM	12 December 2004 (aged 20)	(Guinea) Milo FC	2025	2027	Undisclosed	0	0
12	(Burkina Faso)	Mohamed Zougrana	DM	29 October 2001 (aged 23)	(Ivory Coast) ASEC Mimosas	2023	2028	300,000 €	66	4
14	(Algeria)	Islam Sibous	AM	3 July 2005 (aged 20)	(Algeria) Reserve team	2025	2028	Academy Player	0	0
17	(Algeria)	Chahreddine Boukholda	AM	24 May 1996 (aged 29)	(Algeria) MC Oran	2026	2029	Undisclosed	0	0
21	(Algeria)	Larbi Tabti	AM	23 April 1993 (aged 32)	Free agent	2024	2026	Free transfer	54	2
28	(Algeria)	Oussama Benhaoua	CM	10 April 2002 (aged 23)	(Algeria) Reserve team	2024	2028	Academy Player	11	1
30	(Algeria)	Sid Ahmed Aissaoui	CM	11 January 2005 (aged 20)	(Russia) CSKA Moscow	2025	2027	Undisclosed	0	0
Forwards
7	(Algeria)	Sofiane Bayazid	ST	16 November 1996 (aged 28)	(Algeria) USM Khenchela	2023	2026	50,000,000 DA	67	20
8	(Algeria)	Zinedine Ferhat	RW	1 March 1993 (aged 32)	(France) Angers	2025	2028	Free transfer	0	0
13	(Algeria)	Yacine Hamadouche	ST	15 May 2005 (aged 20)	(Algeria) Reserve team	2025	2029	Academy Player	0	0
15	(Algeria)	Mehdi Boucherit	RW	4 July 2002 (aged 23)	(Algeria) Reserve team	2022	2028	Academy Player	30	3
18	(Guinea)	Mohamed Saliou Bangoura	ST	10 June 2004 (aged 21)	(Guinea) Hafia FC	2025	2028	400,000 US$	15	7
22	(Ivory Coast)	Kipré Zunon	LW	3 September 1999 (aged 25)	(Tanzania) Azam	2024	2028	230,000 €	37	5
23	(Algeria)	Chamseddine Boubetache	LW	14 February 2005 (aged 20)	(Algeria) Reserve team	2022	2028	Academy Player	0	0
24	(Algeria)	Zakaria Naidji	RW	19 January 1995 (aged 30)	(France) Stade Lavallois	2023	2026	200,000 €	73	17
29	(Algeria)	Amine Messoussa	RW	12 October 2004 (aged 20)	(France) Lille	2024	2027	Undisclosed	27	1
37	(Algeria)	Moslem Anatouf	ST	8 May 2006 (aged 19)	(Algeria) Academie FAF	2023	2028	Undisclosed	0	0

== Transfers ==
=== In ===
==== Summer ====
Date	Pos	Player	Moving from	Fee	Source
1 July 2025	ST	(Algeria) Andy Delort	(France) Montpellier	Loan return	
14 July 2025	RB	(Algeria) Aimen Bouguerra	CS Constantine	Free transfer	
5 August 2025	GK	(Algeria) Alexis Guendouz	(Iran) Persepolis	Free transfer	
30 August 2025	CM	(Guinea) Alhassane Bangoura	(Guinea) Milo FC	Undisclosed	
31 August 2025	RW	(Algeria) Zinedine Ferhat	(France) Angers	Free transfer	
31 August 2025	ST	(Algeria) Ishak Boussouf	CR Belouizdad	Free transfer	

==== Winter ====
Date	Pos	Player	Moving from	Fee	Source
3 January 2026	AM	(Algeria) Chahreddine Boukholda	MC Oran	Undisclosed	

=== Out ===
==== Summer ====
Date	Pos	Player	Moving to	Fee	Source
9 July 2025	RB	(Algeria) Kamel Hamidi	Unattached (Note: Hamidi joined ES Sétif on 17 July 2025.)	Free transfer (Released)	
21 July 2025	FW	(Algeria) Khayreddine Merzougui	Unattached	Free transfer (Released)	
21 July 2025	FW	(Ivory Coast) Romaric Ouattara	Unattached (Note: Ouattara joined Olympique Akbou on 24 July 2025.)	Free transfer (Released)	
21 July 2025	CB	(Ivory Coast) Serge Badjo	Unattached (Note: Badjo joined USM Khenchela on 23 August 2025.)	Free transfer (Released)	
21 July 2025	AM	(Algeria) Wael Bouzekri	Unattached	Free transfer (Released)	
21 July 2025	GK	(Algeria) Seif Eddine Belkhir	Unattached	Free transfer (Released)	
21 July 2025	AM	(Algeria) Mehdi Boussaïd	Unattached	Free transfer (Released)	
30 July 2025	DM	(Algeria) Zakaria Draoui	Unattached (Note: Draoui joined USM Alger on 31 July 2025.)	Free transfer (Released)	
7 August 2025	DF	(Algeria) Hamza Mouali	JS Kabylie	Free transfer (Released)	
31 August 2025	CM	(Algeria) Akram Bouras	(Bulgaria) Levski Sofia	350,000 €	
25 August 2025	GK	(Algeria) Toufik Moussaoui	Paradou AC	Loan for one season	

==== Winter ====
Date	Pos	Player	Moving to	Fee	Source
7 January 2026	RW	(Algeria) Ishak Boussouf	Unattached	Free transfer (Released)	
28 January 2026	RW	(Algeria) Tayeb Meziani	Unattached	Free transfer (Released)	

== Pre-season and friendlies ==
As part of its preparations for the 2025–26 season, Mouloudia Club d'Alger will hold a pre-season training camp at the Aïn Draham center in Tunisia. During this camp, the team is scheduled to play four friendly matches against Tunisian, Algerian, and Qatari clubs. The friendly match schedule is as follows: 30 July 2025: Olympique Béja, 2 August 2025: CS Constantine, 4 August 2025: Al-Khor SC and 7 August 2025: CS Hammam-Lif. This training camp forms part of the club’s technical and physical preparation ahead of the official competitions.

30 July 2025 Friendly	Olympique Béja (Tunisia)	0–0	(Algeria) MC Alger	Aïn Draham, Tunisia
17:30 UTC+1		Report
Note: The match was halted after the Tunisian team withdrew in protest over their fans being denied entry.

2 August 2025 Friendly	CS Constantine	2–2	MC Alger	Aïn Draham, Tunisia
17:00 UTC+1	Tahar 40'; Dib 85' (pen.)	Report	Messoussa 56'; Hamadouche 82'	Stadium: Complexe sportif Hammam Bourguiba

4 August 2025 Friendly	SC Ben Arous (Tunisia)	0–3	(Algeria) MC Alger	Aïn Draham, Tunisia
17:00 UTC+1		Report	Naidji; Bouguerra; Messoussa

7 August 2025 Friendly	CS Hammam-Lif (Tunisia)	1–1	(Algeria) MC Alger	Aïn Draham, Tunisia
17:00 UTC+1	Gheraïri 55' (pen.)	Report	Khelif 62'

== Competitions ==
=== Overview ===
Competition	Record								Started round	Final position / round	First match	Last match
Competition	G	W	D	L	GF	GA	GD	Win %	Started round	Final position / round	First match	Last match
Ligue 1	30	20	5	5	41	18	+23	66.67	—N/a	Winners	31 August 2025	5 June 2026
Algerian Cup	4	3	0	1	6	4	+2	75.00	Round of 64	Quarter-finals	4 December 2025	3 March 2026
Super Cup	1	1	0	0	1	0	+1	100.00	Final	Winners	17 January 2026	
Champions League	10	3	4	3	9	7	+2	30.00	First round	group stage	20 September 2025	14 February 2026
Total	45	27	9	9	57	29	+28	60.00				

Updated to match played 5 June 2026
Source: Competitions

=== Ligue 1 ===
==== League table ====
Pos	Team	Pld	W	D	L	GF	GA	GD	Pts	Qualification or relegation
1	MC Alger (C)	30	20	5	5	41	18	+23	65	Qualification for CAF Champions League
2	JS Saoura	30	16	7	7	40	26	+14	55	Qualification for CAF Champions League
3	CR Belouizdad	30	14	11	5	47	24	+23	53	Qualification for CAF Confederation Cup
4	MC Oran	30	14	7	9	36	31	+5	49	
5	JS Kabylie	30	11	12	7	40	31	+9	45	

Source: lfp.dz
Rules for classification: 1) Points; 2) Head-to-head points; 3) Head-to-head goal difference; 4) First half goal difference; 5) First half total goals; 6) Fairplay ranking; 7) Playoff.
(C) Champions

==== Results summary ====
Overall								Home						Away					
Pld	W	D	L	GF	GA	GD	Pts	W	D	L	GF	GA	GD	W	D	L	GF	GA	GD
30	20	5	5	41	18	+23	65	12	2	0	23	7	+16	8	3	5	18	11	+7

Last updated: 5 June 2026.
Source: Competitive matches

==== Results by round ====
Round	1	2	3	4	5	6	7	8	9	10	11	12	13	14	15	16	17	18	19	20	21	22	23	24	25	26	27	28	29	30
Ground	H	A	H	A	H	A	H	H	A	H	A	H	A	H	A	A	H	A	H	A	H	A	A	H	A	H	A	H	A	H
Result	W	D	W	W	W	D	W	W	W	W	W	W	L	W	D	W	W	W	W	L	D	W	W	W	L	W	L	D	L	W
Position	3	4	1	1	1	1	1	1	1	1	1	1	1	1	1	1	1	1	1	1	1	1	1	1	1	1	1	1	1	1

Updated to match(es) played on 5 June 2026. Source: Competitive matches
A = Away; H = Home; W = Win; D = Draw; L = Loss

==== Matches ====
The league fixtures were announced on 31 July 2025.

All times are local, WAT (UTC+1).

Win Draw Loss Postponed

31 August 2025 Round 2	USM Alger	0–0	MC Alger	Blida
19:00		Soccerway; LFP		Stadium: Mustapha Tchaker Stadium; Attendance: 6.000; Referee: Rafik Aouina

12 September 2025 Round 4	Olympique Akbou	0–1	MC Alger	Béjaïa
16:00		Soccerway; LFP	Halaïmia 8'	Stadium: Maghrebi Unity Stadium; Referee: Yahia Dehar; VAR: Fateh Harkat

16 September 2025 Round 5	MC Alger	3–2	MC Oran	Douéra
19:00	Naidji 15'; Bayazid 37'; Hamadouche 90+3'	Soccerway; LFP	Mohutsiwa 32'; Moulay 68'	Stadium: Ali La Pointe Stadium; Attendance: 0 (close doors); Referee: Mehdi Oukil; VAR: Redouane Allou

4 October 2025 Round 7	MC Alger	1–0	ES Mostaganem	Douéra
18:00	Naidji 51'	Soccerway; LFP		Stadium: Ali La Pointe Stadium; Referee: Tahar Boudjemaa; VAR: Lahlou Benbraham

22 October 2025 Round 8	MC Alger	2–1	Paradou AC	Douéra
20:00	Zunon 11'; Anatouf 72'	Soccerway; LFP	Kermiche 90+2'	Stadium: Ali La Pointe Stadium; Referee: Lahlou Benbraham; VAR: Alaa Bouab

30 October 2025 Round 9	USM Khenchela	0–1	MC Alger	Khenchela
15:00		Soccerway; LFP	Bayazid 37'	Stadium: Amar Hamam Stadium; Referee: Alaa Bouab

3 November 2025 Round 10	MC Alger	1–0	JS Saoura	Douéra
20:00	Bouguerra 66'	Soccerway; LFP		Stadium: Ali La Pointe Stadium; Referee: Youcef Gamouh

9 November 2025 Round 11	MC El Bayadh	0–1	MC Alger	El Bayadh
14:30		Soccerway; LFP	Tabti 75'	Stadium: Zakaria Medjdoub Stadium; Referee: Nabil Boukhalfa

8 December 2025 Round 1	MC Alger	2–1	CR Belouizdad	Douéra
20:00	Bayazid 23'; Bangoura 81'	Soccerway; LFP	El Melali 18'	Stadium: Ali La Pointe Stadium; Referee: Fateh Harkat

18 December 2025 Round 13	MB Rouissat	1–0	MC Alger	Ouargla
17:00	Amrane 26'	Soccerway; LFP		Stadium: 18 February Stadium; Referee: Abdelali Ibrir

23 December 2025 Round 3	MC Alger	1–0	ES Ben Aknoun	Douéra
19:30	Ghezala 56' (pen.)	Soccerway; LFP		Stadium: Ali La Pointe Stadium; Referee: Alaa Bouab

29 December 2025 Round 14	MC Alger	2–0	ES Sétif	Douéra
19:30	Ferhat 47'; Bangoura 57' (pen.)	Soccerway; LFP		Stadium: Ali La Pointe Stadium; Referee: Haitham Ghouti

2 January 2026 Round 6	JS Kabylie	1–1	MC Alger	Tizi Ouzou
17:00	Madani 82' (pen.)	Soccerway; LFP	Bangoura 61'	Stadium: Hocine Aït Ahmed Stadium; Referee: Akram Mechairia

5 January 2026 Round 12	MC Alger	1–0	CS Constantine	Douéra
20:00	Ferhat 90+6'	Soccerway; LFP		Stadium: Ali La Pointe Stadium; Referee: Nabil Boukhalfa

9 January 2026 Round 15	ASO Chlef	0–0	MC Alger	Chlef
16:00		Soccerway; LFP		Stadium: Mohamed Boumezrag Stadium; Referee: Rafik Aouina

20 February 2026 Round 20	MC Oran	2–1	MC Alger	Bir El Djir
22:00	Traoré 25'; Abdellaoui 90+4' (o.g.)	Soccerway; LFP	Ferhat 41'	Stadium: Miloud Hadefi Stadium; Referee: Alaa Bouab

26 February 2026 Round 21	MC Alger	0–0	JS Kabylie	Douéra
22:00		Soccerway; LFP		Stadium: Ali La Pointe Stadium; Referee: Lahlou Benbraham

7 March 2026 Round 22	ES Mostaganem	0–5	MC Alger	Sidi Ali
15:00		Soccerway; LFP	Bangoura 47', 56', 73', 88'; Menezla 70'	Stadium: Larbi Belhamiti Stadium; Referee: Rafik Aouina

13 March 2026 Round 23	Paradou AC	0–2	MC Alger	Dar El Beïda
15:15		Soccerway; LFP	Bangoura 28' (pen.); Naidji 38'	Stadium: Omar Benrabah Stadium; Referee: Lotfi Bekouassa

17 March 2026 Round 24	MC Alger	2–1	USM Khenchela	Douéra
22:00	Menezla 87'; Ghezala 90+7' (pen.)	Soccerway; LFP	Bakir 45+1'	Stadium: Ali La Pointe Stadium; Referee: Houssam Benyahia

25 March 2026 Round 16	CR Belouizdad	0–1	MC Alger	Baraki
17:45		Soccerway; LFP	Naidji 3'	Stadium: Nelson Mandela Stadium; Attendance: 0 (close doors); Referee: Nabil Boukhalfa

1 April 2026 Round 17	MC Alger	1–0	USM Alger	Douéra
16:00	Ferhat 14'	Soccerway; LFP		Stadium: Ali La Pointe Stadium; Attendance: 0 (close doors); Referee: Yahia Dehar

5 April 2026 Round 25	JS Saoura	2–1	MC Alger	Béchar
20:00	Zaalani 45+1'; Saadi 81'	Soccerway; LFP	Naidji 16'	Stadium: 20 August 1955 Stadium; Referee: Youcef Taieb Bouderbal

9 April 2026 Round 26	MC Alger	3–0	MC El Bayadh	Douéra
20:00	Naidji 15'; Zunon 20'; Ferhat 40'	Soccerway; LFP		Stadium: Ali La Pointe Stadium; Referee: Mehdi Oukil

16 April 2026 Round 27	CS Constantine	2–0	MC Alger	Constantine
18:00	Omoyele 61'; Bangoura 84' (o.g.)	Soccerway; LFP		Stadium: Chahid Hamlaoui Stadium; Referee: Abdelali Ibrir

21 April 2026 Round 18	ES Ben Aknoun	2–3	MC Alger	Belouizdad
16:00	Lakehal 14'; Djabout 56'	Soccerway; LFP	Ferhat 51', 90+1'; Bayazid 90+5'	Stadium: 20 August 1955 Stadium; Referee: Anes Azrine

28 April 2026 Round 19	MC Alger	2–1	Olympique Akbou	Douéra
20:00	Naidji 27'; Bangoura 90+5' (pen.)	Soccerway; LFP	Addadi 52'	Stadium: Ali La Pointe Stadium; Referee: Haitham Ghouti

8 May 2026 Round 28	MC Alger	1–1	MB Rouissat	Douéra
18:00	Bangoura 23'	Soccerway; LFP	Merzougui 90+3'	Stadium: Ali La Pointe Stadium; Referee: Youcef Taieb-Bouderbal

20 May 2026 Round 29	ES Sétif	1–0	MC Alger	Sétif
17:45	Zerrouki 44'	Soccerway; LFP		Stadium: 8 May 1945 Stadium; Referee: Abdelali Ibrir

5 June 2026 Round 30	MC Alger	2–0	ASO Chlef	Douéra
18:30	Bangoura 18'; Bayazid 87'	Soccerway; LFP		Stadium: Ali La Pointe Stadium; Referee: Tayeb Benyebka

=== Algerian Cup ===
4 December 2025 Round of 64	MC Alger	1–0	MC El Bayadh	Douéra
19:00	Benhaoua 12'	Report		Stadium: Ali La Pointe Stadium; Referee: Tayeb Benyebka

13 December 2025 Round of 32	MC Alger	2–1	USM Khenchela	Douéra
17:00	Messoussa 6'; Bayazid 49'	Report	Djaouchi 11'	Stadium: Ali La Pointe Stadium; Referee: Yahia Dahar

13 January 2026 Round of 16	MC Alger	1–0	ES Ben Aknoun	Douéra
19:00	Chahrour 96' (o.g.)	Report		Stadium: Ali La Pointe Stadium; Referee: Tahar Boudjemaa

3 March 2026 Quarter-finals	CR Belouizdad	3–2 (a.e.t.)	MC Alger	Baraki
22:00	Ben Hammouda 17'; Khacef 46'; Laouafi 100'	Report	Ghezala 29' (pen.); Bangoura 90'	Stadium: Nelson Mandela Stadium; Referee: Tahar Boudjemaa; VAR: Youcef Taieb Bouderbal

=== Super Cup ===
17 January 2026	MC Alger	1–0	USM Alger	Baraki
17:00	Naidji 74'	Report		Stadium: Nelson Mandela Stadium; Attendance: 20,000; Referee: Anes Azrine

=== Champions League ===
==== Qualifying rounds ====
In the qualifying rounds, each tie will be played on a home-and-away two-legged basis. If the aggregate score will be tied after the second leg, the away goals rule will be applied, and if still tied, extra time will not be played, and a penalty shoot-out will be used to determine the winner (Regulations III. 13 & 14). The draw for the qualifying rounds was held on 9 August 2025, 10:00 GMT (13:00 local time, UTC+3), in Dar es Salaam, Tanzania.

===== First round =====
20 September 2025 First leg	Fassell (Liberia)	0–0	(Algeria) MC Alger	Paynesville
16:00 UTC+0		Report		Stadium: Samuel Kanyon Doe Sports Complex
Note: MC Alger Lineups: Guendouz, Abdellaoui, Ghezala, Halaimia, Bouguerra, Zougrana, Tabti (substituted off) (Bangoura A, (substituted on) ), Benhaoua (substituted off) (Boubetache, (substituted on) ), Messoussa (substituted off) (Zunon, (substituted on) ), Naidji (substituted off) (Hamadouche, (substituted on) ), Bayazid (substituted off) (Ferhat, (substituted on) ).

27 September 2025 Second leg	MC Alger (Algeria)	3–0 (3–0 agg.)	(Liberia) Fassell	Douéra
20:00 UTC+1	Abdellaoui 19'; Bayazid 45+1'; Messoussa 90+1'	Report		Stadium: Ali La Pointe Stadium; Attendance: 0 (close doors); Referee: Lamin Jammeh (Gambia)
Note: MC Alger Lineups: Guendouz, Abdellaoui, Ghezala, Halaïmia, Bouguerra (substituted off) 46' (Messoussa, (substituted on) 46'), Zougrana (substituted off) 38' (Benkhemassa, (substituted on) 38'), Tabti, Benhaoua, Zunon (substituted off) 62' (Ferhat, (substituted on) 62'), Naidji (substituted off) 62' (Bangoura A, (substituted on) 62'), Bayazid (substituted off) 79' (Boucherit, (substituted on) 79').

===== Second round =====
19 October 2025 First leg	Colombe Sportive (Cameroon)	1–1	(Algeria) MC Alger	Yaoundé
14:00 UTC+1	Loemba 14'	Report	Ghezala 85'	Stadium: Ahmadou Ahidjo Stadium; Referee: Mohamed Athoumani (Comoros)
Note: MC Alger Lineups: Guendouz, Abdellaoui, Ghezala, Halaïmia, Bouguerra, Benkhemassa (substituted off) 46' (Anatouf, (substituted on) 75'), Benhaoua, Ferhat (substituted off) 46' (Bangoura A, (substituted on) 46'), Zunon (substituted off) 46' (Messoussa, (substituted on) 46'), Naidji (substituted off) 46' (Tabti, (substituted on) 46'), Bayazid (substituted off) 67' (Hamadouche, (substituted on) 67').

26 October 2025 Second leg	MC Alger (Algeria)	0–0 (1–1 (a) agg.)	(Cameroon) Colombe Sportive	Douéra
20:00 UTC+1		Report		Stadium: Ali La Pointe Stadium; Referee: Charles Benle Bulu (Ghana)
Note: MC Alger Lineups: Guendouz, Abdellaoui, Ghezala, Halaimia, Bouguerra, Benkhemassa, Benhaoua, Tabti (substituted off) 90+4' (Khelif, (substituted on) 90+4'), Bangoura A (substituted off) 53' (Ferhat, (substituted on) 53'), Naidji (substituted off) 80' (Zunon, (substituted on) 80'), Bayazid (substituted off) 90+4' (Messoussa, (substituted on) 90+4').

==== Group stage ====
The draw for the group stage was held on 3 November 2025, 12:00 GMT (14:00 local time, UTC+2), in Johannesburg, South Africa. The 16 winners of the second round will be drawn into four groups of four. The teams were seeded by their performances in the CAF competitions for the previous five seasons (CAF 5-year ranking points shown next to every team). Each group contained one team from each of Pot 1 and Pot 2, Pot 3 and Pot 4, and each team was allocated to the positions in their group according to their pot.

Pos	Team	Pld	W	D	L	GF	GA	GD	Pts	Qualification	HIL	MSFC	MCA	FCSEL
1	(Sudan) Al Hilal	6	3	2	1	9	7	+2	11	Advance to knockout stage	—	2–1	2–1	1–0
2	(South Africa) Mamelodi Sundowns	6	2	3	1	9	6	+3	9	Advance to knockout stage	2–2	—	2–0	3–1
3	(Algeria) MC Alger	6	2	1	3	5	6	−1	7		2–1	0–0	—	2–0
4	(Democratic Republic of the Congo) Saint-Éloi Lupopo	6	1	2	3	4	8	−4	5		1–1	1–1	1–0	—

Source: CAF

21 November 2025 1	Al Hilal (Sudan)	2–1	(Algeria) MC Alger	Kigali (Rwanda)
15:00 UTC+2	Raouf 45+2'; Abdelrahman 75'	Report	Karshoum 53' (o.g.)	Stadium: Amahoro Stadium; Referee: Charles Benle Bulu (Ghana)

28 November 2025 2	MC Alger (Algeria)	0–0	(South Africa) Mamelodi Sundowns	Douéra
20:00 UTC+1		Report		Stadium: Ali La Pointe Stadium; Referee: Jean Ouattara (Burkina Faso)

25 January 2026 3	Saint-Éloi Lupopo (Democratic Republic of the Congo)	1–0	(Algeria) MC Alger	Lubumbashi
15:00 UTC+2	Kimputu 90+5'	Report		Stadium: Stade TP Mazembe; Referee: Joseph Ogabor (Nigeria)

1 February 2026 4	MC Alger (Algeria)	2–0	(Democratic Republic of the Congo) Saint-Éloi Lupopo	Douéra
20:00 UTC+1	Khelif 53'; Naidji 82'	Report		Stadium: Ali La Pointe Stadium; Referee: Celso Alvação (Mozambique)

6 February 2026 5	MC Alger (Algeria)	2–1	(Sudan) Al Hilal	Douéra
20:00 UTC+1	Anatouf 15'; Ferhat 44'	Report	M'Bracek 77'	Stadium: Ali La Pointe Stadium; Referee: Clément Kpan (Ivory Coast)

14 February 2026 6	Mamelodi Sundowns (South Africa)	2–0	(Algeria) MC Alger	Pretoria
15:00 UTC+2	León 6', 63'	Report		Stadium: Loftus Versfeld Stadium; Referee: Lominson Todihajaniaina (Madagascar)

== Squad information ==
=== Appearances and goals ===
As of 5 June 2026

No.	Pos	Player	Nat	Ligue 1			Algerian Cup			Super Cup			Champions League			Total		
No.	Pos	Player	Nat	App	St	G	App	St	G	App	St	G	App	St	G	App	St	G
Goalkeepers
1	GK	Abdelatif Ramdane	(Algeria)	16	15	0	1	1	0	0	0	0	0	0	0	17	16	0
26	GK	Alexis Guendouz	(Algeria)	15	15	0	3	3	0	1	1	0	10	10	0	29	29	0
40	GK	Mastias Hammache	(Algeria)	0	0	0	0	0	0	0	0	0	0	0	0	0	0	0
Defenders
2	CB	Rostom Dendaoui	(Algeria)	6	1	0	2	2	0	0	0	0	0	0	0	8	3	0
3	LB	Marwane Khelif	(Algeria)	22	18	0	4	4	0	0	0	0	7	5	1	33	27	1
5	CB	Ayoub Abdellaoui	(Algeria)	21	21	0	3	3	0	1	1	0	10	10	1	35	35	1
19	CB	Ayoub Ghezala	(Algeria)	23	22	2	3	3	1	1	1	0	8	7	0	35	33	3
20	RB	Réda Halaïmia	(Algeria)	26	24	1	2	1	0	1	1	0	7	6	0	36	32	1
25	RB	Aimen Bouguerra	(Algeria)	21	17	1	2	2	0	1	1	0	8	7	0	32	27	1
27	CB	Abdelkader Menezla	(Algeria)	16	13	2	2	0	0	1	0	0	2	2	0	21	15	2
32	CB	Daniel Mehdid	(Algeria)	1	0	0	1	0	0	0	0	0	1	0	0	3	0	0
36	RB	Yakoub Gassi	(Algeria)	4	2	0	1	1	0	0	0	0	3	3	0	8	6	0
Midfielders
6	DM	Mohamed Benkhemassa	(Algeria)	25	23	0	3	3	0	1	1	0	6	6	0	35	33	0
10	CM	Alhassane Bangoura	(Guinea)	24	13	1	3	2	0	0	0	0	10	3	0	37	18	1
12	DM	Mohamed Zougrana	(Burkina Faso)	14	10	0	3	2	0	1	0	0	7	5	0	25	17	0
14	AM	Islam Sibous	(Algeria)	2	0	0	0	0	0	0	0	0	0	0	0	2	0	0
17	AM	Chahreddine Boukholda	(Algeria)	9	2	0	2	2	0	1	1	0	4	3	0	16	8	0
21	AM	Larbi Tabti	(Algeria)	23	18	1	3	1	0	0	0	0	7	6	0	33	25	1
28	CM	Oussama Benhaoua	(Algeria)	28	21	0	4	4	1	1	1	0	9	8	1	42	34	2
30	CM	Sid Ahmed Aissaoui	(Algeria)	0	0	0	0	0	0	0	0	0	0	0	0	0	0	0
31	AM	Mehdi Hedroug	(Algeria)	0	0	0	1	0	0	0	0	0	0	0	0	1	0	0
Forwards
7	ST	Sofiane Bayazid	(Algeria)	21	6	5	3	2	1	1	1	0	7	6	1	32	15	7
8	RW	Zinedine Ferhat	(Algeria)	28	26	7	3	3	0	1	1	0	10	7	1	42	37	8
13	ST	Yacine Hamadouche	(Algeria)	7	0	1	0	0	0	0	0	0	3	0	0	10	0	1
15	RW	Mehdi Boucherit	(Algeria)	15	6	0	1	0	0	0	0	0	1	0	0	17	6	0
18	ST	Mohamed Saliou Bangoura	(Guinea)	19	12	10	3	0	1	0	0	0	0	0	0	22	12	11
22	RW	Kipré Zunon	(Ivory Coast)	25	17	2	4	2	0	1	0	0	9	3	0	39	22	2
23	RW	Chamseddine Boubetache	(Algeria)	0	0	0	0	0	0	0	0	0	1	0	0	1	0	0
24	RW	Zakaria Naidji	(Algeria)	26	20	7	2	1	0	1	0	1	10	7	1	39	28	9
29	ST	Amine Messoussa	(Algeria)	16	7	0	1	1	1	1	0	0	8	1	1	26	9	2
37	ST	Moslem Anatouf	(Algeria)	12	1	1	3	1	0	1	1	0	4	3	1	20	6	2
Players transferred out during the season
~~17~~	RW	Ishak Boussouf	(Algeria)	1	0	0	2	0	0	0	0	0	0	0	0	3	0	0
~~11~~	RW	Tayeb Meziani	(Algeria)	3	0	0	0	0	0	0	0	0	0	0	0	3	0	0
Total				30		41	4		4	1		1	10		9	45		57

Last updated: 5 June 2026
Source: soccerway.com

=== Goalscorers ===
As of 5 June 2026

Includes all competitive matches.

No.	Nat.	Player	Pos.	L1	AC	SC	CL	TOTAL
18	(Guinea)	Mohamed Saliou Bangoura	ST	10	1	0	0	11
24	(Algeria)	Zakaria Naidji	RW	7	0	1	1	9
8	(Algeria)	Zinedine Ferhat	RW	7	0	0	1	8
7	(Algeria)	Sofiane Bayazid	ST	5	1	0	1	7
19	(Algeria)	Ayoub Ghezala	CB	2	1	0	1	4
37	(Algeria)	Moslem Anatouf	ST	1	0	0	1	2
27	(Algeria)	Abdelkader Menezla	CB	2	0	0	0	2
22	(Ivory Coast)	Kipré Zunon	LW	2	0	0	0	2
20	(Algeria)	Réda Halaïmia	RB	1	0	0	0	1
13	(Algeria)	Yacine Hamadouche	ST	1	0	0	0	1
5	(Algeria)	Ayoub Abdellaoui	CB	0	0	0	1	1
29	(Algeria)	Amine Messoussa	ST	0	0	0	1	1
19	(Algeria)	Aimen Bouguerra	RB	1	0	0	0	1
21	(Algeria)	Larbi Tabti	AM	1	0	0	0	1
28	(Algeria)	Oussama Benhaoua	CM	0	1	0	0	1
29	(Algeria)	Amine Messoussa	ST	0	1	0	0	1
10	(Guinea)	Alhassane Bangoura	AM	1	0	0	0	1
3	(Algeria)	Marwane Khelif	LB	0	0	0	1	1
Own Goals				0	1	0	1	2
Totals				41	6	1	9	57

=== Clean sheets ===
As of 5 June 2026

					Clean sheets				
No.	Nat	Name	GP	GA	L1	AC	SC	CL	Total
1	(Algeria)	Abdelatif Ramdane	17	11	7	0	0	0	7
26	(Algeria)	Alexis Guendouz	29	18	10	2	1	5	18
40	(Algeria)	Mastias Hammache	0	0	0	0	0	0	0
		TOTALS		29	17	2	1	5	25
