= 2024–25 MC Alger season =

MC Alger
2024–25 season
- Owner: Sonatrach
- President: Mohamed Hakim Hadj Redjem
- Head coach: Patrice Beaumelle (until 16 December 2024); Khaled Ben Yahia (from 17 December 2024)
- Stadium: Stade du 5 Juillet
- Ligue 1: 1st
- Algerian Cup: Round of 32
- Super Cup: Winners
- Champions League: Quarter-finals
- Top goalscorer: League: Mohamed Saliou Bangoura (7 goals); All: Sofiane Bayazid (10 goals)
- Average home league attendance: 40,742
Home colours	Away colours

The 2024–25 season, is MC Alger's 56th season and the club's 21st consecutive season in the top flight of Algerian football. In addition to the domestic league, MC Alger are participating in the Algerian Cup, Super Cup and the Champions League. On June 27, 2024, The federal office approved the calendar for the 2024–25 Ligue 1 season with the aim of ending on May 31, 2025. The first round is scheduled for September 14, this delay is motivated both by an extended end of the 2023–24 season but also by the holding of early presidential elections which will take place on September 7, 2024. However, the Ligue de Football Professionnel decided to postpone the start of the Ligue 1 by a week, on September 21.

== Review ==
=== Background ===
On June 17, 2024, RMC Sport announced Paris Saint-Germain's denial regarding the partnership that was to be announced as having been signed with MC Alger. The latter announced a meeting between Fabien Delem, the senior executive director of Paris SG and the one responsible for commercial strategy in the Middle East and North Africa region. This meeting was organized by the Qatari telephone company Ooredoo, the official sponsor of the two teams. On June 27, during the federal office meeting it was announced that the Super Cup, which had been absent since 2020. On July 3, 2024, Ali La Pointe Stadium in Douéra was officially inaugurated by the President of the Republic Abdelmadjid Tebboune. The stadium should host MC Alger matches from the start of the 2024–25 season.

On July 7, MC Alger announced via its official Facebook page, the renewal of Patrice Beaumelle's contract until 2025. The new contract provides for a salary increase and new objectives on the national and African level, namely the Ligue 1 champion title and at least the group stage of the CAF Champions League. On July 15, Patrice Beaumelle responded positively to the request of players who want to benefit from a few extra days of rest before the start of the season, which promises to be long and exhausting with participation in four different competitions. Where did the technical staff decide to return to training on July 24. On July 24, the owner of MC Alger Sonatrach has refused the resignation of the president of the CA Mohamed Hakim Hadj Redjem. In a press release published on the club's official Facebook page. Hachichi asked him to continue the Mouloudia sports project. The CEO of Sonatrach praised the efforts of the president who led the team to win the championship title last season.

Following urgent requests from certain clubs, the Algerian Football Federation has decided to increase the number of foreign players in the Ligue 1. After having formally passed through the technical college chaired by Rabah Saâdane, the FAF ratified the increase in the number of foreigners per club from 3 to 5. However, that there is a provision intended to serve as a safeguard for the license of a foreign player or coach to be validated, the club must pay the federation a deposit equivalent to 12 months salary. This is to protect against any financial dispute. MC Alger flew to France on July 27 to begin its training camp without its Algerian international Youcef Belaïli. The Oran native decided to skip training and not take part in the training camp that take place in Rennes, following the decision of the club's management not to extend the contract of Farès Belaïli, his brother. Sonatrach, the company that owns the shares of the MC Alger, has announced the signing of an agreement with the Amateur Sports Club (CSA). According to a press release published on the official Sonatrach Facebook page, a meeting was held at the company's headquarters bringing together the group's secretary general Abdelkader Zerrouki, the chairman of the board of directors Mohamed Hakim Hadj-Redjem and the chairman of the Amateur Sports Club Mohamed Khaldi. With the signing of this agreement, MC Alger will be able to recover the licenses and the qualification of the players in anticipation of the new season.

==== First-team transfers (summer transfer window) ====
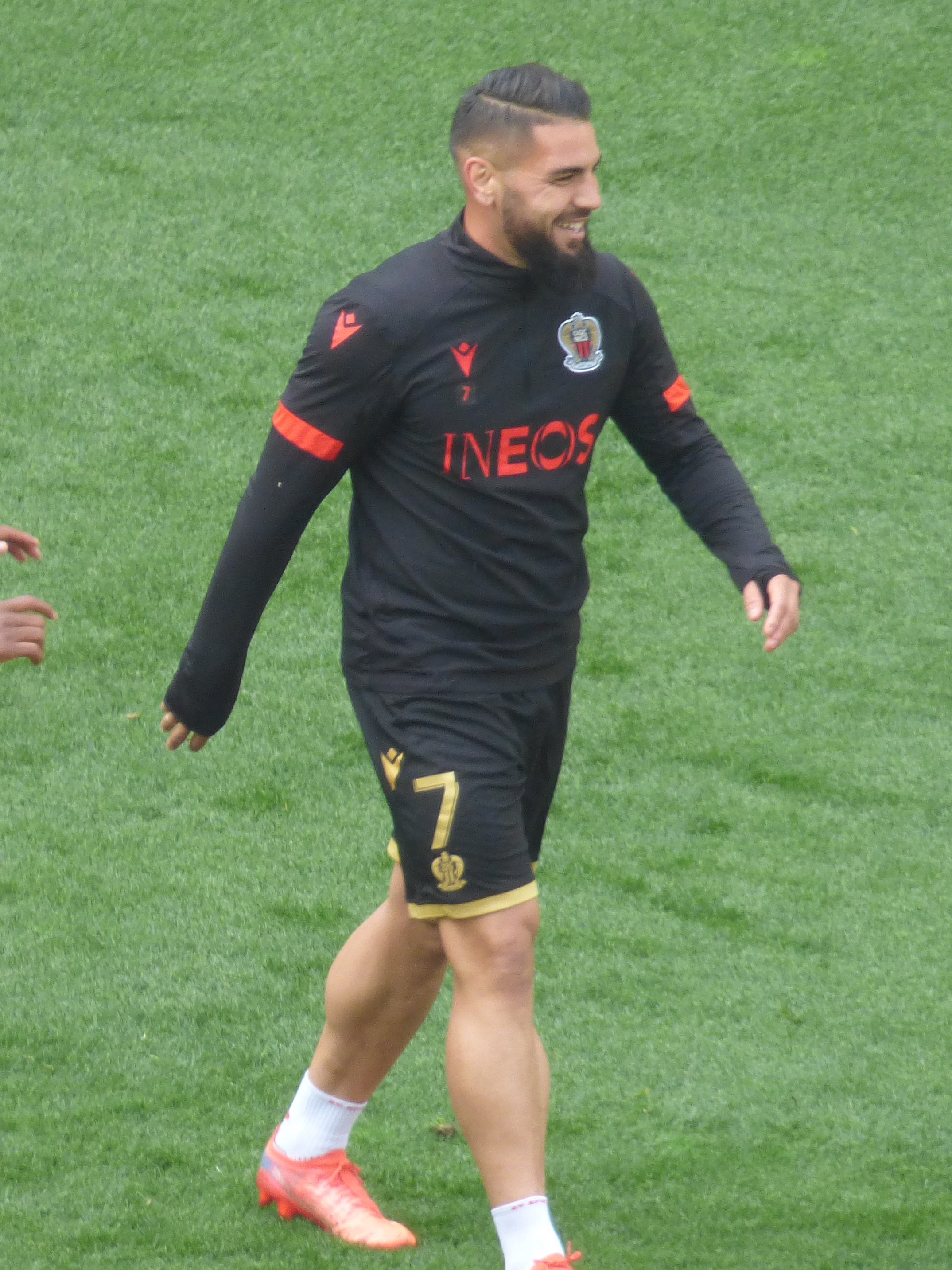
Algerian international Andy Delort joins Mouloudia for three seasons for 1.5 million euros, coming from Umm Salal SC of Qatar.

On July 8, 2024, Zakaria Draoui has officially signed up with Mouloudia as the first summer recruit. Where he signed a contract for three seasons for an extraordinary monthly salary of 8 million DA, coming from Wydad AC, which terminated his contract with him. On the same day, the 1.98' international Toufik Moussaoui, who spent a large part of his career at Paradou AC, signed a contract for three seasons and will be the first choice goalkeeper in front of Abdelatif Ramdane while Oussama Litim does not have the confidence of the coaching staff. The next day, Ivorian striker Kipre Junior arrived in Algeria to sign his contract for four seasons, coming from the Tanzanian club Azam, and his discharge paper amounted to 230 thousand euros. On July 21, after a long wait that lasted nearly a month, Khayreddine Merzougui was about to join the elite team. Merzougui met with Hadj Redjem to discuss continuing their joint adventure. As a result of these races, Merzougui will remain at MC Alger for an additional season, but this became possible after agreeing to make concessions on the financial level.

On July 27, Mouloudia d'Alger signed a contract with Ivorian defender Serge Badjo for three seasons coming from FC d'Abobo, Badjo is therefore the fourth Mouloudean recruit since the start of the transfer window. On July 28, MC Alger announced in an official press release that it had accepted the offer submitted by Espérance de Tunis for Youcef Belaïli. The leaders of Mouloudia decided to take this decision after the recent problems caused by Belaïli's entourage. After only one season with Mouloudia d'Alger, Belaïli decided to leave the Algerian Ligue 1 and return to Espérance. Algerian international Andy Delort moved to Algeria on September 8 with the aim of completing his transfer to Mouloudia d'Alger. The board of directors of Mouloudia d'Alger met with Delort and his advisor, but Delort had a €2 million release clause from Umm Salal SC, and was therefore not free to sign wherever he wanted. After studying the matter, the session was adjourned without reaching a solution. On September 10, Delort signed a three-year contract with Mouloudia and Umm Salal SC will eventually receive 1.5 million euros distributed over three years at a rate of 500 thousand euros per year.

=== Start of season ===
The season started in the first round of the African Cup against Liberia's Watanga, and after an agreement between the two clubs, it was decided to play both matches in Algeria. In the first leg at the Nelson Mandela Stadium, MC Alger won with two goals scored by Draoui and Kipre. The second leg was moved to the Mustapha Tchaker Stadium and will be played behind closed doors. Because the pitch at Mandela Stadium was very poor, CAF decided to move this match to Blida. Mouloudia won again with the same result to qualify for the next round easily. Mouloudia d'Alger lost the first leg of the second qualifying round for the group stage of the Champions League, against US Monastir in Tunis. The only goal of the match was scored by Ghezala against his own goal. MC Alger in its new Ali La Pointe Stadium managed to win in a difficult situation with a score of 2–0 in order to qualify for the group stage.

Before the match started, there were problems between the fans and the Gendarmerie Nationale, who were in charge of managing the match instead of the Police, as is the usual. The first problem was opening one door for entry instead of the 13 that were in place. During the match, in the last quarter, violence broke out in the stands between the Gendarmerie Nationale and the fans, which saw some chairs being broken and tear gas ending up on the pitch. The new Ali La Pointe Stadium has reportedly been closed until further notice. This decision follows incidents that occurred during the match between MC Alger and US Monastir, to the point that a tear gas bomb was thrown onto the pitch, causing general chaos. The temporary closure of the stadium is intended to allow a thorough investigation to determine the causes of the disturbances and to put in place the necessary measures to prevent such incidents from happening again.

On November 24, the Confederation of African Football announced a major penalty following the events that took place against US Monastir. CAF has decided to impose four matches behind closed doors, two of which are suspended. This suspension is accompanied by a fine of $50,000. The two remaining matches will be automatically activated if other similar incidents occur in the next 12 months. Following the serious incidents that marred the derby match against CR Belouizdad on November 20, 2024, the Disciplinary Committee punished the two teams. After postponing its decision until the end of its meeting on November 25, and after studying other documents, in particular videos, the committee punished the team by ordering it to play four matches behind closed doors, two of which were suspended. It will also have to pay 200,000 DZD, not counting the financial compensation that the stadium manager will request.

=== Season run in ===
Three years is enough. We must have the culture of making way for young people, so that they can bring new ideas. I spent three years with Mouloudia, I gave everything. It's time to make way for someone with more ambition. My goal was to go as far as possible in the CAF Champions League, but we failed. I hope others will succeed where we failed.

— Mohamed Hakim Hadj Redjem a statement after his resignation.

On April 10, Mohamed Hakim Hadj Redjem officially announced his resignation from the presidency of the board of directors of MC Alger, upon his return from South Africa, where the club was eliminated in the quarter-finals of the CAF Champions League after a draw 0–0 against Orlando Pirates. This decision comes after three years at the helm of MC Alger. Redjem also acknowledged that the major objective of this season was qualification for the semi-finals, a goal that was missed. On May 5, 20255, Mouloudia d'Alger continues to strengthen its ties with Chinese companies. After extending its sponsorship deal with Hisense, the club has now signed a new partnership with Infinix, which has committed to funding two training camps per year. MCA is also in talks with PEAK, a Chinese sports brand, to replace Puma as its official kit supplier. These moves reflect the club's strategy to diversify its revenue sources and enhance its financial independence.

=== MC Alger Crowned Champion on Tragic Day Marked by Stadium Accident ===
On June 21, 2025, MC Alger successfully defended their Ligue 1 title after a tense final day of the season. With only a two-point lead, the team secured their 9th championship despite being held to a goalless draw by a determined NC Magra side fighting to avoid relegation. In a hard-fought match, the MCA struggled to break through but ultimately did enough to finish top of the table. The fans were finally able to celebrate another title after a season marked by consistent performances. However, what was meant to be a historic day for MC Alger was tragically overshadowed by an accident at Stade du 5 Juillet. Shortly after the final whistle, a catastrophic crowd surge occurred in the south stand, where supporters rushed toward the barriers, causing a partial collapse of the structure.

According to a statement from the Ministry of Health, the latest toll from the incident stands at 3 dead and 81 injured. The injured were distributed across three hospitals: 38 at Beni Messous Hospital, 27 at Ben Aknoun Hospital, and 16 at Mohamed Lamine Debaghine Hospital in Bab El Oued. Of the 81 injured, 70 have since been discharged after receiving the necessary treatment. Following instructions from President Abdelmadjid Tebboune, a high level delegation including the Minister of Health, Abdelhak Saihi, the Minister of Youth, Mustapha Hidaoui, the Presidential Adviser for Communication, Kamel Sidi Saïd, the Secretaries General of the Ministries of Sports and Interior and the Wali of Algiers visited the injured supporters in the three hospitals. The delegation inquired about the fans’ conditions and the quality of care provided.

== Squad list ==
Players and squad numbers last updated on 21 June 2025.
Note: Flags indicate national team as has been defined under FIFA eligibility rules. Players may hold more than one non-FIFA nationality.

No.	Nat.	Name	Position	Date of birth (age)	Signed from	Signed in	Contract ends	Transfer fees	Apps	Goals
Goalkeepers
1	(Algeria)	Abdelatif Ramdane	GK	19 May 2001 (aged 23)	(Algeria) JS Kabylie	2022	2025		45	0
16	(Algeria)	Toufik Moussaoui	GK	20 April 1991 (aged 33)	(Algeria) Paradou AC	2024	2027	Free transfer	16	0
30	(Algeria)	Seifeddine Belkhir	GK	21 January 2001 (aged 23)	(Algeria) Youth system		2028	Academy Player	1	0
Defenders
3	(Algeria)	Marwane Khelif	LB	8 February 2000 (aged 24)	(Algeria) JS Saoura	2024	2028	Undisclosed	26	0
4	(Ivory Coast)	Serge Badjo	CB	28 December 2002 (aged 21)	(Ivory Coast) FC d'Abobo	2024	2027	Undisclosed	10	0
5	(Algeria)	Ayoub Abdellaoui (C.)	CB	16 February 1993 (aged 31)	(Saudi Arabia) Ettifaq FC	2022	2026	Free transfer	94	7
14	(Algeria)	Hamza Mouali	LB	16 January 1998 (aged 26)	(France) Stade Lavallois	2023	2026		57	0
17	(Algeria)	Kamel Hamidi	RB	May 1, 1996 (aged 28)	(Algeria) MC Oran	2021	2025		97	1
19	(Algeria)	Ayoub Ghezala	CB	December 6, 1995 (aged 28)	(Algeria) USM Annaba	2021	2026		122	3
20	(Algeria)	Réda Halaïmia	RB	August 28, 1996 (aged 28)	(Belgium) Beerschot	2022	2026	Free transfer	102	6
27	(Algeria)	Abdelkader Menezla	CB	January 6, 2001 (aged 23)	(Algeria) USM Bel Abbès	2022	2026		42	2
Midfielders
6	(Algeria)	Mohamed Benkhemassa	DM	28 June 1993 (aged 31)	(Egypt) Ismaily SC	2023	2027	Free transfer	77	2
8	(Algeria)	Zakaria Draoui	DM	12 February 1994 (aged 29)	(Morocco) Wydad AC	2024	2027	Free transfer	26	2
12	(Burkina Faso)	Mohamed Zougrana	DM	29 October 2001 (aged 21)	(Ivory Coast) ASEC Mimosas	2023	2028	300,000 €	66	4
21	(Algeria)	Larbi Tabti	AM	23 April 1993 (aged 30)	Free agent	2024	2026	Free transfer	54	2
23	(Algeria)	Mehdi Boussaïd	AM	25 December 1995 (aged 28)	(United Arab Emirates) Hatta Club	2025	2026	Free transfer	5	0
26	(Algeria)	Akram Bouras	CM	23 February 2002 (aged 22)	(Algeria) CR Belouizdad	2024	2027	Free transfer	38	4
28	(Algeria)	Oussama Benhaoua	CM	10 April 2002 (aged 22)	(Algeria) Reserve team	2024		Academy Player	11	1
37	(Algeria)	Sid Ahmed Aissaoui	CM	11 January 2005 (aged 19)	(Russia) CSKA Moscow	2025	2025	Loan	0	0
Forwards
7	(Algeria)	Sofiane Bayazid	ST	16 November 1996 (aged 27)	(Algeria) USM Khenchela	2023	2026	50,000,000 DA	67	20
9	(Guinea)	Mohamed Saliou Bangoura	ST	10 June 2004 (aged 20)	(Guinea) Hafia FC	2025	2028	400,000 US$	15	7
11	(Algeria)	Tayeb Meziani	RW	27 February 1996 (aged 28)	(Tunisia) Club Africain	2024	2027	Free transfer	30	1
18	(Algeria)	Khayreddine Merzougui	FW	16 August 1992 (aged 32)	(Algeria) CR Belouizdad	2022	2025	Free transfer	66	15
22	(Ivory Coast)	Kipré Zunon	RW	3 September 1999 (aged 25)	(Tanzania) Azam	2024	2028	230,000 €	37	5
24	(Algeria)	Zakaria Naidji	ST	19 January 1995 (aged 29)	(France) Stade Lavallois	2023	2026	200,000 €	73	17
25	(Ivory Coast)	Romaric Ouattara	ST	14 October 2004 (aged 19)	(Ivory Coast) Stade d'Abidjan	2024	2028	Undisclosed	10	2
29	(Algeria)	Amine Messoussa	FW	12 October 2004 (aged 19)	(France) Lille	2024	2027	Undisclosed	27	1

== Transfers ==
=== In ===
==== Summer ====
Date	Pos	Player	Moving from	Fee	Source
8 July 2024	MF	(Algeria) Zakaria Draoui	(Morocco) Wydad AC	Free transfer	
8 July 2024	GK	(Algeria) Toufik Moussaoui	Paradou AC	Free transfer	
9 July 2024	FW	(Ivory Coast) Kipré Zunon	(Tanzania) Azam	230,000 €	
27 July 2024	DF	(Ivory Coast) Serge Badjo	(Ivory Coast) FC d'Abobo	Undisclosed	
4 August 2024	LB	(Algeria) Marwane Khelif	JS Saoura	80,000,000 DA	
15 August 2024	RW	(Algeria) Tayeb Meziani	(Tunisia) Club Africain	Free transfer	
22 August 2024	FW	(Algeria) Amine Messoussa	(France) Lille	Undisclosed	
24 August 2024	FW	(Algeria) Akram Bouras	CR Belouizdad	Free transfer	
10 September 2024	ST	(Algeria) Andy Delort	(Qatar) Umm Salal SC	1,500,000 €	

==== Winter ====
Date	Pos	Player	Moving from	Fee	Source
5 February 2025	ST	(Guinea) Mohamed Saliou Bangoura	(Guinea) Hafia FC	400,000 €	
5 February 2025	AM	(Algeria) Mehdi Boussaïd	(United Arab Emirates) Hatta Club	Free transfer	
5 February 2025	MF	(Algeria) Sid Ahmed Aissaoui	(Russia) CSKA Moscow	Undisclosed	

=== Out ===
==== Summer ====
Date	Pos	Player	Moving to	Fee	Source
9 July 2024	MF	(Algeria) Khalid Dahmani	ES Sétif	Free transfer (Released)	
11 July 2024	GK	(Algeria) Oussama Litim	Unattached (Note: Litim joined USM Khenchela on 5 August 2024.)	Free transfer (Released)	
12 July 2024	DF	(Algeria) Djamel Benlamri	Unattached (Note: Benlamri joined Al-Shorta SC on 15 August 2024.)	Free transfer (Released)	
28 July 2024	FW	(Algeria) Youcef Belaïli	(Tunisia) Espérance de Tunis	679,000 €	
27 August 2024	AM	(Algeria) Abdelmalek Kelaleche	(Tunisia) Club Africain	Loan for one season	
10 September 2024	DM	(Algeria) Badreddine Touki	USM Khenchela	Free transfer (Released)	

==== Winter ====
Date	Pos	Player	Moving to	Fee	Source
29 January 2025	ST	(Algeria) Andy Delort	(France) Montpellier	Six months loan	
1 February 2025	MF	(Algeria) Dalil Hassen Khodja	MC Oran	Free transfer	

=== New contracts ===
No.	Pos	Player	Contract length	Contract end	Date	Source
18	ST	Khayreddine Merzougui	1 year	2025	20 July 2024	
6	DM	Mohamed Benkhemassa	2 years	2027	13 April 2025	

== Pre-season and friendlies ==
31 August 2024 Friendly	MC Alger	2–0	JS Saoura	Baraki
18:00 UTC+1	Menezla (?); Tabti (?)			Stadium: Annexe du Nelson Mandela Stadium

== Competitions ==
=== Overview ===
Competition	Record								Started round	Final position / round	First match	Last match
Competition	G	W	D	L	GF	GA	GD	Win %	Started round	Final position / round	First match	Last match
Ligue 1	30	15	13	2	39	19	+20	50.00	—N/a	Winners	27 September 2024	21 June 2025
Algerian Cup	2	1	0	1	3	1	+2	50.00	Round of 64	Round of 32	30 December 2024	20 February 2025
Super Cup	1	0	1	0	2	2	+0	0.00	Final	Winners	8 February 2025	
CAF Champions League	12	5	4	3	10	4	+6	41.67	First round	Quarter-finals	18 August 2024	9 April 2025
Total	45	21	18	6	54	26	+28	46.67				

Updated to match played 21 June 2025
Source: Competitions

=== Ligue 1 ===
==== League table ====
Pos	Team	Pld	W	D	L	GF	GA	GD	Pts	Qualification or relegation
1	MC Alger (C)	30	15	13	2	39	19	+20	58	Qualification for CAF Champions League
2	JS Kabylie	30	16	8	6	42	27	+15	56	Qualification for CAF Champions League
3	CR Belouizdad	30	15	10	5	44	21	+23	55	Qualification for Confederation Cup (Note: USMA Alger qualified for the 2025–26 CAF Confederation Cup by winning the 2024–25 Algerian Cup)
4	JS Saoura	30	12	7	11	34	36	−2	43	
5	Paradou AC	30	11	8	11	41	39	+2	41	

Source: the-sports.org
Rules for classification: 1) points; 2) head-to-head points; 3) head-to-head goal difference; 4) goal difference; 5) total goals; 6) fairplay ranking; 7) playoff.
(C) Champions

==== Results summary ====
Overall								Home						Away					
Pld	W	D	L	GF	GA	GD	Pts	W	D	L	GF	GA	GD	W	D	L	GF	GA	GD
30	15	13	2	39	19	+20	58	7	7	1	21	12	+9	8	6	1	18	7	+11

Last updated: 21 June 2025.
Source: Competitive matches

==== Results by round ====
Round	1	2	3	4	5	6	7	8	9	10	11	12	13	14	15	16	17	18	19	20	21	22	23	24	25	26	27	28	29	30
Ground	A	H	A	H	A	H	A	H	A	H	A	H	A	H	A	H	A	H	A	H	A	H	A	H	A	H	A	H	A	H
Result	W	D	D	W	W	D	W	D	W	L	D	W	D	D	W	W	W	W	W	D	L	W	D	D	W	W	D	W	D	D
Position	3	2	5	3	1	2	1	1	1	1	1	1	1	2	1	1	1	1	1	1	1	1	1	1	1	1	1	1	1	1

Updated to match(es) played on 21 June 2025. Source: Competitive matches
A = Away; H = Home; W = Win; D = Draw; L = Loss

==== Matches ====
The league fixtures were announced on 11 July 2024.

All times are local, WAT (UTC+1).

Win Draw Loss Postponed

27 September 2024 Round 2	MC Alger	1–1	Paradou AC	Douéra
16:00	Delort 67'	Report	Boulbina 62'	Stadium: Ali La Pointe Stadium; Attendance: 0 (close doors); Referee: Rafik Aouina; VAR: Anes Azrine

1 October 2024 Round 1	JS Kabylie	1–2	MC Alger	Tizi Ouzou
18:00	Madani 42'	Report	Tabti 9'; Halaïmia 68'	Stadium: Hocine Aït Ahmed Stadium; Referee: Nabil Boukhalfa; VAR: Lahlou Benbraham

6 October 2024 Round 3	CS Constantine	1–1	MC Alger	Constantine
16:00	Belhocini 83'	Report	Naidji 73'	Stadium: Ramadane Ben Abdelmalek Stadium; Attendance: 0 (close doors); Referee: Houssam Benyahia

11 October 2024 Round 4	MC Alger	1–0	MC Oran	Baraki
20:30	Naidji 66'	Report		Stadium: Nelson Mandela Stadium; Referee: Alaa Bouab; VAR: Tahar Boudjemaa

18 October 2024 Round 5	USM Khenchela	0–1	MC Alger	Khenchela
16:00		Report	Halaïmia 35'	Stadium: Amar Hamam Stadium; Referee: Youcef Gamouh

24 October 2024 Round 6	MC Alger	0–0	Olympique Akbou	Algiers
20:30		Report		Stadium: Stade du 5 Juillet; Referee: Mehdi Oukil; VAR: Mustapha Ghorbal

9 November 2024 Round 8	MC Alger	0–0	US Biskra	Algiers
17:45		Report		Stadium: Stade du 5 Juillet; Referee: Akram Mechairia; VAR: Tahar Boudjemaa

15 November 2024 Round 9	MC El Bayadh	0–1	MC Alger	El Bayadh
15:00		Report	Delort 46'	Stadium: Zakaria Medjdoub Stadium; Referee: Yahia Dehar

20 November 2024 Round 10	MC Alger	1–3	CR Belouizdad	Algiers
20:00	Delort 15'	Report	Slimani 31'; Benguit 65'; Khacef 90+6'	Stadium: Stade du 5 Juillet; Referee: Rafik Aouina; VAR: Abderahmane Sahraoui

1 December 2024 Round 11	ES Sétif	0–0	MC Alger	Sétif
17:30		Report		Stadium: 8 May 1945 Stadium; Referee: Bilel Soltani; VAR: Lahlou Benbraham

21 December 2024 Round 14	MC Alger	0–0	ASO Chlef	Algiers
16:30		Report		Stadium: Stade du 5 Juillet; Attendance: 0 (close doors); Referee: Akram Mechairia; VAR: Fateh Harkat

26 December 2024 Round 15	NC Magra	1–2	MC Alger	Magra
15:00	Bouzekri 48'	Report	Halaïmia 54', 90+1'	Stadium: Boucheligue Brothers Stadium; Attendance: 0 (close doors); Referee: Houssam Benyahia

24 January 2025 (Note: The match between USM Alger and MC Alger is postponed from November 2 to November 5, 2024, due to preparations for the festivities of November 1 and the celebration of the 70th anniversary of the outbreak of the revolution. Then on October 27, it was postponed to January 24, 2025.) Round 7	USM Alger	0–3	MC Alger	Algiers
18:00		Report	Messoussa 49'; Kipré 57'; Bayazid 90+12'	Stadium: Stade du 5 Juillet; Referee: Akram Mechairia; VAR: Fateh Harkat

29 January 2025 Round 12	MC Alger	1–0	JS Saoura	Algiers
17:00	Draoui 45+2'	Report		Stadium: Stade du 5 Juillet; Attendance: 0 (close doors); Referee: Abderahmane Sahraoui; VAR: Lahlou Benbraham

2 February 2025 Round 13	ES Mostaganem	1–1	MC Alger	Mostaganem
16:00	Benamar 50'	Report	Abdellaoui 9'	Stadium: Mohamed Bensaïd Stadium; Attendance: 0 (close doors); Referee: Fateh Harkat; VAR: Nabil Boukhalfa

13 February 2025 Round 16	MC Alger	3–2	JS Kabylie	Algiers
20:00	Bouras 45+4'; Naidji 66'; Meziani 78'	Report	Ignatyev 71'; Berkane 82'	Stadium: Stade du 5 Juillet; Referee: Yahia Dehar; VAR: Lahlou Benbraham

23 February 2025 Round 17	Paradou AC	1–3	MC Alger	Algiers
20:00	Kaassis 44'	Report	Menezla 10'; Halaïmia 38'; Bayazid 90+2'	Stadium: Stade du 5 Juillet; Referee: Mehdi Oukil

28 February 2025 Round 18	MC Alger	2–1	CS Constantine	Algiers
19:00	Kipré 10'; Bangoura 73'	Report	Temine 4'	Stadium: Stade du 5 Juillet; Referee: Nabil Boukhalfa; VAR: Redouane Allou

6 March 2025 Round 19	MC Oran	0–2	MC Alger	Bir El Djir
22:00		Report	Bayazid 7'; Naidji 49'	Stadium: Miloud Hadefi Stadium; Attendance: 0 (close doors); Referee: Rafik Aouina; VAR: Yahia Dehar

15 March 2025 Round 20	MC Alger	2–2	USM Khenchela	Algiers
22:00	Menezla 55'; Bangoura 75'	Report	Djaouchi 83' (pen.), 90+2'	Stadium: Stade du 5 Juillet; Referee: Alaa Bouab; VAR: Akram Mechairia

15 April 2025 Round 21	Olympique Akbou	1–0	MC Alger	Béjaïa
16:30	Askar 79' (pen.)	Report		Stadium: Maghrebi Unity Stadium; Referee: Mustapha Ghorbal

19 April 2025 Round 23	US Biskra	0–1	MC Alger	Biskra
16:30		Report	Ghezala 49'	Stadium: 18 February Stadium; Referee: Haithem Ghouti; VAR: Rafik Aouina

26 April 2025 Round 24	MC Alger	0–0	MC El Bayadh	Algiers
17:00		Report		Stadium: Stade du 5 Juillet; Referee: Youcef Gamouh; VAR: Abderahmane Sahraoui

12 May 2025 Round 25	CR Belouizdad	1–1	MC Alger	Baraki
17:00	Boussouar 75'	Report	Bangoura 54'	Stadium: Nelson Mandela Stadium; Attendance: 0 (close doors); Referee: Akram Mechairia; VAR: Yahia Dehar

19 May 2025 Round 26	MC Alger	4–1	ES Sétif	Algiers
17:00	Bangoura 20', 71'; Benkhemassa 68'; Bouras 78'	Report	Bouchama 49'	Stadium: Stade du 5 Juillet; Referee: Yahia Dehar; VAR: Lotfi Bekouassa

23 May 2025 Round 22	MC Alger	1–0	USM Alger	Algiers
20:00	Bouras 33'	Report		Stadium: Stade du 5 Juillet; Referee: Tahar Boudjemaa; VAR: Lahlou Benbraham

27 May 2025 Round 27	JS Saoura	0–0	MC Alger	Béchar
19:00		Report		Stadium: 20 August 1955 Stadium; Referee: Alaa Bouab

12 June 2025 Round 28	MC Alger	5–2	ES Mostaganem	Algiers
21:00	Bangoura 5', 86' (pen.); Zunon 22'; Tabti 71'; Bayazid 90+4'	Report	Aoudjane 43'; Tamimi 68'	Stadium: Stade du 5 Juillet; Referee: Haitham Ghouti; VAR: Lotfi Bekouassa

17 June 2025 Round 29	ASO Chlef	0–0	MC Alger	Chlef
17:30		Report		Stadium: Mohamed Boumezrag Stadium; Referee: Nabil Boukhalfa; VAR: Youcef Taieb Bouderbal

21 June 2025 Round 30	MC Alger	0–0	NC Magra	Algiers
17:45		Report		Stadium: Stade du 5 Juillet; Referee: Youcef Taieb Bouderbal; VAR: Fateh Harkat

=== Algerian Cup ===
30 December 2024 Round of 64	ES Ben Aknoun	0–3	MC Alger	Algiers
19:00		Report	Bayazid 3', 43'; Zunon 19'	Stadium: Stade du 5 Juillet; Referee: Abdelali Ibrir

20 February 2025 Round of 32	CR Belouizdad	1–0	MC Alger	Algiers
20:00	Mahious 47'	Report		Stadium: Stade du 5 Juillet; Referee: Houssam Benyahia

=== Super Cup ===
8 February 2025	MC Alger	2–2 (4–3 p)	CR Belouizdad	Algiers
17:00	Bayazid 14' (pen.); Abdellaoui 27'	Report	Mahious 72' (pen.), 88'	Stadium: Stade du 5 Juillet; Referee: Lahlou Benbraham
	Penalties
	Abdellaoui (penalty scored); Halaïmia (penalty missed); Ghezala (penalty scored); Bouras (penalty scored); Messoussa (penalty scored)		(penalty scored) Meziane; (penalty scored) Mayo; (penalty scored) Benayada; (penalty missed) Khacef; (penalty missed) Mahious

=== Champions League ===
==== Qualifying rounds ====
In the qualifying rounds, each tie will be played on a home-and-away two-legged basis. If the aggregate score will be tied after the second leg, the away goals rule was applied, and if still tied, extra time will not be played, and the penalty shoot-out will be used to determine the winner (Regulations III. 13 & 14). The draw for the qualifying rounds was held on 11 July 2024, 12:00 GMT (15:00 local time, UTC+3), at the CAF headquarters in Cairo, Egypt.

===== First round =====
18 August 2024 First leg	Watanga (Liberia)	0–2	(Algeria) MC Alger	Baraki (Algeria) (Note: MC Alger announced that the first leg match against Watanga played at Nelson Mandela Stadium in Algiers, after the agreement between the two sides.)
19:00 UTC+1	Alexander Curtis (yellow card) 11'; Edmond Seah (yellow card) 51'; Philip Tarnue (yellow card) 88'	Report	Draoui 7'; Kipre 41'; Halaïmia (yellow card) 64'; Abdellaoui (yellow card) 90+3'	Stadium: Nelson Mandela Stadium; Referee: Jose Asangono (Equatorial Guinea)
Note: Lineup for MC Alger – Ramdane, Abdellaoui, Ghezala (substituted off) 84' (Badjo, (substituted on) 84'), Mouali, Halaïmia, Draoui (substituted off) 75' (Tabti, (substituted on) 75'), Benkhemassa, Zougrana, Naidji, Bayazid (substituted off) 68' (Merzougui, (substituted on) 68'), Kipré Jr (substituted off) 68' (Boucherit, (substituted on) 68').

22 August 2024 Second leg	MC Alger (Algeria)	2–0 (4–0 agg.)	(Liberia) Watanga	Blida
20:00 UTC+1	Bayazid 16'; Benkhemassa (yellow card) 45'; Benhaoua 89'	Report	Barclay (yellow card) 34'; Tarnue (yellow card) 41'	Stadium: Mustapha Tchaker Stadium; Attendance: 0 (close doors); Referee: Yannick Malala Kabanga (DR Congo)
Note: Lineup for MC Alger – Ramdane, Abdellaoui (substituted off) 85' (Menezla, (substituted on) 85'), Halaïmia (substituted off) 74' (Hamidi, (substituted on) 74'), Mouali, Ghezala, Benkhemassa, Draoui, Zougrana (substituted off) 74' (Tabti, (substituted on) 74'), Naidji, Kipré Jr (substituted off) 68' (Benhaoua, (substituted on) 68'), Bayazid (substituted off) 68' (Merzougui, (substituted on) 68').

===== Second round =====
13 September 2024 First leg	US Monastir (Tunisia)	0–1	(Algeria) MC Alger	Tunis
18:00 UTC+1	Ghezala 23' (o.g.); Haj Ali (yellow card) 45'; Mestouri (yellow card) 73'; Azzouz (yellow card) 88'	Report	Naidji (yellow card) 51'; Benkhemassa (yellow card) 73'; Zougrana (yellow card) 75'	Stadium: Stade Hammadi Agrebi; Referee: Amin Omar (Egypt)
Note: Lineup for MC Alger – Moussaoui, Halaïmia, Mouali, Abdellaoui (c), Ghezala, Benkhemassa, Zougrana (substituted off) 87' (Menezla, (substituted on) 87'), Draoui (substituted off) 74' (Bouras, (substituted on) 74'), Naidji (substituted off) 87' (Meziani, (substituted on) 87'), Kipré Jr (substituted off) 60' (Benhaoua, (substituted on) 60'), Bayazid (substituted off) 60' (Messousa, (substituted on) 60').

21 September 2024 Second leg	MC Alger (Algeria)	2–0 (2–1 agg.)	(Tunisia) US Monastir	Algiers
20:00 UTC+1	Naidji 71' (yellow card) 87'; Orkuma 82' (o.g.); Bouras (yellow card) 60'; Moussaoui (yellow card) 88'	Report	Hadj Ali (yellow card) 37'; Soltani (yellow card) 45'; Slimane (yellow card) 64'; Orkuma (yellow card) 81'; Mestouri (yellow card) 84'	Stadium: Ali La Pointe Stadium; Referee: Abongile Tom (South Africa)
Note: Lineup for MC Alger – Moussaoui, Abdellaoui, Halaïmia, Mouali, Ghezala, Benkhemassa, Zougrana (substituted off) 73' (Bayazid, (substituted on) 73'), Meziani (substituted off) 58' (Benhaoua, (substituted on) 58'), Naidji (substituted off) 88' (Menezla, (substituted on) 88'), Kipre Jr (substituted off) 58' (Bouras, (substituted on) 58'), Messoussa.

==== Group stage ====
The draw for the group stage was held on 7 October 2024, 11:00 GMT (14:00 local time, UTC+3), in Cairo, Egypt. The 16 winners of the second round of qualifying rounds were drawn into four groups of four. The teams were seeded by their performances in the CAF competitions for the previous five seasons (CAF 5-year ranking points shown next to every team). Each group contains one team from each of Pot 1, Pot 2, Pot 3, and Pot 4, and each team were allocated to the positions in their group according to their pot.

Pos	Team	Pld	W	D	L	GF	GA	GD	Pts	Qualification	HIL	MCA	YNG	TPM
1	(Sudan) Al Hilal	6	3	1	2	6	7	−1	10	Advance to knockout stage	—	1–1	0–1	2–1
2	(Algeria) MC Alger	6	2	3	1	4	2	+2	9	Advance to knockout stage	0–1	—	2–0	1–0
3	(Tanzania) Young Africans	6	2	2	2	5	6	−1	8		0–2	0–0	—	3–1
4	(Democratic Republic of the Congo) TP Mazembe	6	1	2	3	7	7	0	5		4–0	0–0	1–1	—

Source: CAF

26 November 2024 1	TP Mazembe (Democratic Republic of the Congo)	0–0	(Algeria) MC Alger	Lubumbashi
15:00 UTC+2		Report		Stadium: Stade TP Mazembe; Referee: Patrice Milazare (Mauritius)

7 December 2024 2	MC Alger (Algeria)	2–0	(Tanzania) Young Africans	Algiers
20:00 UTC+1	Abdellaoui 64'; Bayazid 90+5'	Report		Stadium: Stade du 5 Juillet; Attendance: 0 (close doors); Referee: Daniel Nii Laryea (Ghana)

14 December 2024 3	MC Alger (Algeria)	0–1	(Sudan) Al Hilal	Algiers
20:00 UTC+1		Report	G. Fofana 76'	Stadium: Stade du 5 Juillet; Attendance: 0 (close doors); Referee: Djindo Louis Houngnandande (Benin)

5 January 2025 4	Al Hilal (Sudan)	1–1	(Algeria) MC Alger	Nouakchott (Mauritania) (Note: Al Hilal played their home matches at Cheikha Ould Boïdiya Stadium in Nouakchott (Mauritania), instead of their regular stadium, Al Hilal Stadium, Omdurman, due to the Sudanese civil war.)
19:00 UTC+0	Girumugisha 78'	Report	Bayazid 5'	Stadium: Cheikha Ould Boïdiya Stadium; Referee: Ibrahim Kalilou Traoré (Ivory Coast)

10 January 2025 5	MC Alger (Algeria)	1–0	(Democratic Republic of the Congo) TP Mazembe	Algiers
20:00 UTC+1	Bouras 36' (pen.)	Report		Stadium: Stade du 5 Juillet; Referee: Abongile Tom (South Africa)

18 January 2025 6	Young Africans (Tanzania)	0–0	(Algeria) MC Alger	Dar es Salaam
16:00 UTC+3		Report		Stadium: Benjamin Mkapa Stadium; Referee: Patrice Milazare (Mauritius)

==== knockout stage ====
Each tie in the knockout phase will be played over two legs, with each team playing one leg at home. The team that will score more goals on aggregate over the two legs will advance to the next round. If the aggregate score will be level, the away goals rule will be applied, i.e. the team that will score more goals away from home over the two legs will advance. If away goals will be also equal, then extra time will not be played and the winners will be decided by a penalty shoot-out (Regulations III. 26 & 27). The bracket was decided after the draw for the knockout stage, which was held on 20 February 2025, 18:00 AST (UTC+3) at the beIN Sports headquarters in Doha, Qatar.

===== Quarter-finals =====
1 April 2025 First leg	MC Alger (Algeria)	0–1	(South Africa) Orlando Pirates	Algiers
20:00 UTC+1		Report	Nkota 65'	Stadium: Stade du 5 Juillet; Referee: Mahmood Ismail (Sudan)

9 April 2025 Second leg	Orlando Pirates (South Africa)	0–0 (1–0 agg.)	(Algeria) MC Alger	Johannesburg
18:00 UTC+2		Report		Stadium: Orlando Stadium; Referee: Ibrahim Kalilou Traoré (Ivory Coast)

== Squad information ==
=== Appearances and goals ===
As of 21 June 2024

No.	Pos	Player	Nat	Ligue 1			Algerian Cup			Super Cup			Champions League			Total		
No.	Pos	Player	Nat	App	St	G	App	St	G	App	St	G	App	St	G	App	St	G
Goalkeepers
1	GK	Abdelatif Ramdane	(Algeria)	17	17	0	2	2	0	1	1	0	9	9	0	29	29	0
16	GK	Toufik Moussaoui	(Algeria)	13	13	0	0	0	0	0	0	0	3	3	0	16	16	0
30	GK	Seifeddine Belkhir	(Algeria)	0	0	0	0	0	0	0	0	0	0	0	0	0	0	0
Defenders
3	LB	Marwane Khelif	(Algeria)	22	20	0	1	1	0	1	1	0	2	2	0	26	24	0
4	CB	Serge Badjo	(Ivory Coast)	9	5	0	0	0	0	0	0	0	1	0	0	10	5	0
5	CB	Ayoub Abdellaoui	(Algeria)	21	21	1	2	2	0	1	1	1	11	11	1	35	35	3
14	LB	Hamza Mouali	(Algeria)	10	8	0	1	1	0	0	0	0	8	7	0	19	16	0
17	RB	Kamel Hamidi	(Algeria)	8	4	0	2	1	0	0	0	0	5	3	0	15	8	0
19	CB	Ayoub Ghezala	(Algeria)	27	26	1	2	2	0	1	1	0	12	12	0	42	41	1
20	RB	Réda Halaïmia	(Algeria)	28	26	5	1	1	0	1	1	0	12	12	0	42	40	5
27	CB	Abdelkader Menezla	(Algeria)	15	8	2	1	0	0	0	0	0	7	1	0	23	9	2
Midfielders
6	MF	Mohamed Benkhemassa	(Algeria)	25	23	1	2	2	0	1	1	0	12	12	0	40	38	1
8	MF	Zakaria Draoui	(Algeria)	15	7	1	1	1	0	0	0	0	10	6	1	26	14	2
12	MF	Mohamed Zougrana	(Burkina Faso)	22	14	0	1	1	0	1	1	0	8	6	0	32	22	0
21	MF	Larbi Tabti	(Algeria)	26	23	2	1	1	0	1	0	0	10	8	0	38	32	2
23	MF	Mehdi Boussaïd	(Algeria)	4	0	0	1	0	0	0	0	0	0	0	0	5	0	0
26	MF	Akram Bouras	(Algeria)	28	26	3	1	1	0	1	1	0	8	5	1	38	33	4
28	MF	Oussama Benhaoua	(Algeria)	7	3	0	0	0	0	0	0	0	4	0	1	11	3	1
Forwards
7	FW	Sofiane Bayazid	(Algeria)	18	7	4	2	2	2	1	1	1	12	6	3	33	16	10
9	FW	Mohamed Saliou Bangoura	(Guinea)	13	10	7	0	0	0	0	0	0	2	2	0	15	12	7
11	FW	Tayeb Meziani	(Algeria)	18	6	1	2	1	0	1	0	0	9	7	0	30	14	1
15	FW	Mehdi Boucherit	(Algeria)	6	0	0	0	0	0	0	0	0	1	0	0	7	0	0
18	FW	Khayreddine Merzougui	(Algeria)	14	2	0	2	0	0	0	0	0	2	0	0	18	2	0
22	FW	Kipré Zunon	(Ivory Coast)	24	18	3	2	2	1	1	1	0	10	5	1	37	26	5
24	FW	Zakaria Naidji	(Algeria)	25	24	4	1	1	0	1	0	0	12	9	1	39	34	5
25	FW	Romaric Ouattara	(Ivory Coast)	2	0	0	0	0	0	0	0	0	0	0	0	2	0	0
29	FW	Amine Messoussa	(Algeria)	18	9	1	1	1	0	1	1	0	7	4	0	27	15	1
Players transferred out during the season
~~9~~	FW	Andy Delort	(Algeria)	10	10	3	0	0	0	0	0	0	5	3	0	15	13	3
Total				30		39	2		3	1		2	12		10	45		54

Last updated: 21 June 2025
Source: mondefootball.fr

=== Goalscorers ===
As of 21 June 2025

Includes all competitive matches.

No.	Nat.	Player	Pos.	L1	AC	SC	CL1	TOTAL
7	(Algeria)	Sofiane Bayazid	FW	4	2	1	3	10
9	(Guinea)	Mohamed Saliou Bangoura	FW	7	0	0	0	7
20	(Algeria)	Réda Halaïmia	RB	5	0	0	0	5
22	(Ivory Coast)	Kipré Zunon	FW	3	1	0	1	5
24	(Algeria)	Zakaria Naidji	FW	4	0	0	1	5
26	(Algeria)	Akram Bouras	MF	3	0	0	1	4
9	(Algeria)	Andy Delort	FW	3	0	0	0	3
5	(Algeria)	Ayoub Abdellaoui	CB	1	0	1	1	3
27	(Algeria)	Abdelkader Menezla	CB	2	0	0	0	2
21	(Algeria)	Larbi Tabti	MF	2	0	0	0	2
8	(Algeria)	Zakaria Draoui	MF	0	0	0	1	1
28	(Algeria)	Oussama Benhaoua	MF	0	0	0	1	1
11	(Algeria)	Tayeb Meziani	FW	1	0	0	0	1
29	(Algeria)	Amine Messoussa	FW	1	0	0	0	1
6	(Algeria)	Mohamed Benkhemassa	MF	1	0	0	0	1
19	(Algeria)	Ayoub Ghezala	CB	1	0	0	0	1
Own Goals				0	0	0	1	1
Totals				39	3	2	10	54

=== Clean sheets ===
As of 21 June 2025

Includes all competitive matches.

					Clean sheets				
No.	Nat	Name	GP	GA	L1	AC	SC	CL1	Total
1	(Algeria)	Abdelatif Ramdane	29	15	11	1	0	6	18
16	(Algeria)	Toufik Moussaoui	16	11	5	0	0	2	7
30	(Algeria)	Seifeddine Belkhir	0	0	0	0	0	0	0
		TOTALS		26	16	1	0	8	25
