= 2026–27 MC Alger season =

MC Alger
2026–27 season
- Owner: Sonatrach
- President: Mohamed Hakim Hadj Redjem (until 7 September 2026); Mohamed Arabi Yaakoubi (from 7 September 2026)
- Head coach: Khaled Ben Yahia
- Stadium: Ali La Pointe Stadium
- Ligue 1: 4th
- Algerian Cup: Round of 64
- Super Cup: Final
- Confederation Cup: Group stage

The 2026–27 season, is MC Alger's 58th season and the club's 23rd consecutive season in the top flight of Algerian football. In addition to the domestic league, MC Alger are participating in the Algerian Cup, Super Cup and the Champions League.

== Squad list ==
Players and squad numbers last updated on 31 August 2026.
Note: Flags indicate national team as has been defined under FIFA eligibility rules. Players may hold more than one non-FIFA nationality.

No.	Nat.	Name	Position	Date of Birth (Age)	Signed from
Goalkeepers
1	(Algeria)	Abdelatif Ramdane	GK	19 May 2001 (aged 25)	(Algeria) JS Kabylie
16	(Algeria)	Yassine Gourari Tebaa	GK	13 April 2001 (aged 25)	(Luxembourg) FC Atert Bissen
30	(Algeria)	Mastias Hammache	GK	25 November 2006 (aged 19)	(Canada) CF Montréal U23
Defenders
2	(Algeria)	Yakoub Gassi	RB	6 March 2006 (aged 20)	(Algeria) Reserve team
3	(Algeria)	Marwane Khelif	LB	8 February 2000 (aged 26)	(Algeria) JS Saoura
5	(Algeria)	Ayoub Abdellaoui (C.)	CB	16 February 1993 (aged 33)	(Saudi Arabia) Ettifaq FC
19	(Algeria)	Ayoub Ghezala	CB	6 December 1995 (aged 30)	(Algeria) USM Annaba
20	(Algeria)	Réda Halaïmia	RB	August 28, 1996 (aged 29)	(Belgium) Beerschot
25	(Algeria)	Aimen Bouguerra	RB	10 January 1997 (aged 29)	(Algeria) CS Constantine
26	(Algeria)	Yacine Chaib	LB	27 January 2005 (aged 21)	(France) Olympique Lyonnais
27	(Algeria)	Abdelkader Menezla	CB	6 January 2001 (aged 25)	(Algeria) USM Bel Abbès
Midfielders
4	(Algeria)	Abdelouahab Satta	AM	9 October 2006 (aged 19)	(Algeria) Reserve team
6	(Algeria)	Mohamed Benkhemassa	DM	28 June 1993 (aged 33)	(Egypt) Ismaily SC
12	(Burkina Faso)	Mohamed Zougrana	DM	29 October 2001 (aged 24)	(Ivory Coast) ASEC Mimosas
17	(Algeria)	Chahreddine Boukholda	AM	24 May 1996 (aged 30)	(Algeria) MC Oran
21	(Algeria)	Mohamed Islam Abdelkader	AM	6 February 2004 (aged 22)	(Algeria) Paradou AC
23	(Algeria)	Merouane Mehdaoui	CM	10 January 1998 (aged 28)	(Algeria) Olympique Akbou
28	(Algeria)	Oussama Benhaoua	CM	10 April 2002 (aged 24)	(Algeria) Reserve team
Forwards
7	(Algeria)	Sofiane Bayazid	ST	16 November 1996 (aged 29)	(Algeria) USM Khenchela
8	(Algeria)	Zinedine Ferhat	RW	1 March 1993 (aged 33)	(France) Angers
10	(Jordan)	Ali Azaizeh	RW	13 April 2004 (aged 22)	(Kuwait) Kazma SC
11	(Burundi)	Mossi Nduwumwe	RW	29 November 2003 (aged 22)	(Tanzania) Singida Black Stars
13	(Algeria)	Yacine Hamadouche	ST	15 May 2005 (aged 21)	(Algeria) Reserve team
14	(Algeria)	Ben Ahmed Kohili	ST	11 July 2005 (aged 21)	(Algeria) Paradou AC
15	(Algeria)	Mehdi Boucherit	RW	4 July 2002 (aged 24)	(Algeria) Reserve team
18	(Guinea)	Mohamed Saliou Bangoura	ST	10 June 2004 (aged 22)	(Guinea) Hafia FC
22	(Algeria)	Siriman Konaté	ST	12 February 2004 (aged 22)	(Algeria) US Chaouia
24	(Algeria)	Zakaria Naidji	RW	19 January 1995 (aged 31)	(France) Stade Lavallois

== Transfers ==
=== In ===
==== Summer ====
Date	Pos	Player	Moving from	Fee	Source
7 July 2026	CM	(Algeria) Merouane Mehdaoui	Olympique Akbou	Undisclosed	
7 July 2026	AM	(Algeria) Mohamed Islam Abdelkader	Paradou AC	Undisclosed	
7 July 2026	ST	(Algeria) Ben Ahmed Kohili	Paradou AC	Undisclosed	
7 July 2026	ST	(Algeria) Siriman Konaté	US Chaouia	Free transfer	
6 August 2026	RW	(Burundi) Mossi Nduwumwe	(Tanzania) Singida Black Stars	Loan	
22 August 2026	LB	(Algeria) Yacine Chaib	(France) Olympique Lyonnais	Free transfer	
30 August 2026	GK	(Algeria) Yassine Gourari Tebaa	(Luxembourg) FC Atert Bissen	Free transfer	
31 August 2026	RW	(Jordan) Ali Azaizeh	(Kuwait) Kazma SC	Loan	

==== Winter ====
Date	Pos	Player	Moving from	Fee	Source

=== Out ===
==== Summer ====
Date	Pos	Player	Moving to	Fee	Source
15 June 2026	AM	(Algeria) Larbi Tabti	ES Sétif	Free transfer	
5 July 2026	LW	(Ivory Coast) Kipré Zunon	(Tanzania) Azam F.C.	Undisclosed	
11 July 2026	ST	(Algeria) Chamseddine Boubetache	Unattached	Free transfer (Released)	
11 July 2026	CB	(Algeria) Rostom Dendaoui	Unattached	Free transfer (Released)	
19 July 2026	CM	(Guinea) Alhassane Bangoura	JS El Biar	Undisclosed	
8 August 2026	ST	(Algeria) Moslem Anatouf	CS Constantine	Loan	
10 August 2026	GK	(Algeria) Alexis Guendouz	JS Kabylie	Undisclosed	
22 August 2026	CM	(Algeria) Sid Ahmed Aissaoui	CR Témouchent	Free transfer	
25 August 2026	LW	(Algeria) Mehdi Hedroug	CR Témouchent	Loan	
30 August 2026	CB	(Algeria) Rami Bouaouiche	JS Kabylie	Free transfer	
31 August 2026	ST	(Algeria) Amine Messoussa	Unattached	Free transfer (Released)	

==== Winter ====
Date	Pos	Player	Moving to	Fee	Source

== Competitions ==
=== Overview ===
Competition	Record								Started round	Final position / round	First match	Last match
Competition	G	W	D	L	GF	GA	GD	Win %	Started round	Final position / round	First match	Last match
Ligue 1	8	5	1	2	9	3	+6	62.50	—N/a	To be confirmed	18 September 2026	In Progress
Algerian Cup	0	0	0	0	0	0	+0	—	Round of 64	To be confirmed	December 2026	In Progress
Super Cup	0	0	0	0	0	0	+0	—	Final	To be confirmed	2 January 2027	
Champions League	4	2	1	1	8	2	+6	50.00	Second round	To be confirmed	6 September 2026	In Progress
Total	12	7	2	3	17	5	+12	58.33				

Updated to match played 19 November 2026
Source: Competitions

=== Ligue 1 ===
==== League table ====
Pos	Team	Pld	W	D	L	GF	GA	GD	Pts	Qualification or relegation
3	MC Oran	9	5	3	1	8	3	+5	18	Qualification for CAF Confederation Cup
4	MB Rouissat	10	5	3	2	10	6	+4	18	
5	MC Alger	8	5	1	2	9	3	+6	16	
6	Olympique Akbou	9	4	3	2	10	6	+4	15	
7	USM Alger	8	4	2	2	10	7	+3	14	

Updated to match(es) played on 20 November 2026. Source: lfp.dz
Rules for classification: 1) Points; 2) Head-to-head points; 3) Head-to-head goal difference; 4) First half goal difference; 5) First half total goals; 6) Fairplay ranking; 7) Playoff.

==== Results summary ====
Overall								Home						Away					
Pld	W	D	L	GF	GA	GD	Pts	W	D	L	GF	GA	GD	W	D	L	GF	GA	GD
8	5	1	2	9	2	+7	16	4	0	1	7	0	+7	1	1	1	2	2	0

Last updated: 19 November 2026.
Source: Competitive matches

==== Results by round ====
Round	1	2	3	4	5	6	7	8	9	10	11	12	13	14	15	16	17	18	19	20	21	22	23	24	25	26	27	28	29	30
Ground	H	A	H	H	A	H	A	H	A	H	A	H	A	H	A	A	H	A	A	H	A	H	A	H	A	H	A	H	A	H
Result	W		W	W	D		W	W	L	L																				
Position	1																													

Updated to match(es) played on 19 November 2026. Source: Competitive matches
A = Away; H = Home; W = Win; D = Draw; L = Loss

==== Matches ====
The league fixtures were announced on 3 August 2026.

All times are local, WAT (UTC+1).

Win Draw Loss Postponed

18 September 2026 Round 3	MC Alger	2–0	MB Rouissat	Douéra
19:00	Boukholda 7'; Kohili 61'	Flashscore; LFP		Stadium: Ali La Pointe Stadium; Referee: Haitham Ghouti

9 October 2026 Round 4	MC Alger	1–0	CR Témouchent	Douéra
20:00	Kohili 77'	Flashscore; LFP		Stadium: Ali La Pointe Stadium; Referee: Tahar Boudjemaa

13 October 2026 Round 5	ASO Chlef	1–1	MC Alger	Chlef
18:00	Ferhat 14'	Flashscore; LFP	Diakité 61'	Stadium: Mohamed Boumezrag Stadium; Referee: Rafiq Aouina

27 October 2026 Round 7	US Biskra	2–1	MC Alger	Zeribet El Oued
15:00		Flashscore; LFP	Konaté 57'	Stadium: Bouhafs Chabi Stadium; Referee: Alaa Bouab

31 October 2026 Round 8	MC Alger	2–0	USM Khenchela	Douéra
15:00	Ghezala 2'; Bayazid 68'	Flashscore; LFP		Stadium: Ali La Pointe Stadium; Referee: Nabil Boukhalfa

4 November 2026 Round 1	MC Alger	2–0	MC Oran	Douéra
20:00	Ghezala 24' (pen.), 89'	Flashscore; LFP		Stadium: Ali La Pointe Stadium; Referee: Lahlou Benbraham

8 November 2026 Round 9	JS El Biar	1–0	MC Alger	Dar El Beïda
14:00	Kermiche 7'	Flashscore; LFP		Stadium: Omar Benrabah Stadium; Referee: Yahia Dahar

19 November 2026 Round 10	MC Alger	0–1	Olympique Akbou	Douéra
17:45		Flashscore; LFP	Sediri 21'	Stadium: Ali La Pointe Stadium; Referee: Ayoub Belhachemi

23 November 2026 Round 2	JS Kabylie	–	MC Alger	Tizi Ouzou
19:00		Flashscore; LFP		Stadium: Hocine Aït Ahmed Stadium; Referee: Alaa Bouab

Round 6	MC Alger	–	ES Sétif	Douéra
:		Flashscore; LFP		Stadium: Ali La Pointe Stadium

Round 11	USM Alger	–	MC Alger	Algiers
:		Flashscore; LFP		Stadium: Stade du 5 Juillet

Round 12	MC Alger	–	JS Saoura	Douéra
:		Flashscore; LFP		Stadium: Ali La Pointe Stadium

Round 13	ES Ben Aknoun	–	MC Alger	Belouizdad
:		Flashscore; LFP		Stadium: 20 August 1955 Stadium

Round 14	MC Alger	–	CR Belouizdad	Douéra
:		Flashscore; LFP		Stadium: Ali La Pointe Stadium

Round 15	CS Constantine	–	MC Alger	Constantine
:		Flashscore; LFP		Stadium: Chahid Hamlaoui Stadium

Round 16	MC Oran	–	MC Alger	Bir El Djir
:		Flashscore; LFP		Stadium: Miloud Hadefi Stadium

Round 17	MC Alger	–	JS Kabylie	Douéra
:		Flashscore; LFP		Stadium: Ali La Pointe Stadium

Round 18	MB Rouissat	–	MC Alger	Ouargla
:		Flashscore; LFP		Stadium: 18 February Stadium

Round 19	CR Témouchent	–	MC Alger	Aïn Témouchent
:		Flashscore; LFP		Stadium: Omar Oucief Stadium

Round 20	MC Alger	–	ASO Chlef	Douéra
:		Flashscore; LFP		Stadium: Ali La Pointe Stadium

Round 21	ES Sétif	–	MC Alger	Sétif
:		Flashscore; LFP		Stadium: 8 May 1945 Stadium

Round 22	MC Alger	–	US Biskra	Douéra
:		Flashscore; LFP		Stadium: Ali La Pointe Stadium

Round 23	USM Khenchela	–	MC Alger	Khenchela
:		Flashscore; LFP		Stadium: Amar Hamam Stadium

Round 24	MC Alger	–	JS El Biar	Douéra
:		Flashscore; LFP		Stadium: Ali La Pointe Stadium

Round 25	Olympique Akbou	–	MC Alger	Akbou
:		Flashscore; LFP		Stadium: Martyrs Stadium

Round 26	MC Alger	–	USM Alger	Douéra
:		Flashscore; LFP		Stadium: Ali La Pointe Stadium

Round 27	JS Saoura	–	MC Alger	Béchar
:		Flashscore; LFP		Stadium: 20 August 1955 Stadium

Round 28	MC Alger	–	ES Ben Aknoun	Douéra
:		Flashscore; LFP		Stadium: Ali La Pointe Stadium

Round 29	CR Belouizdad	–	MC Alger	Baraki
:		Flashscore; LFP		Stadium: Nelson Mandela Stadium

Round 30	MC Alger	–	CS Constantine	Douéra
:		Flashscore; LFP		Stadium: Ali La Pointe Stadium

=== Algerian Cup ===
December 2026 Round of 64	–
:

=== Super Cup ===
2 January 2027	MC Alger	–	USM Alger
:

=== Champions League ===
==== Qualifying rounds ====
In the qualifying rounds, each tie will be played on a home-and-away two-legged basis. If the aggregate score will be tied after the second leg, the away goals rule will be applied, and if still tied, extra time will not be played, and a penalty shoot-out will be used to determine the winner (Regulations III. 13 & 14).

===== First round =====
6 September 2026 First leg	(Niger) ASN Nigelec	0–0	MC Alger (Algeria)	Niamey
16:30 UTC+1		Report		Stadium: Seyni Kountche Stadium; Referee: Adama Koné (Mali)

12 September 2026 Second leg	(Algeria) MC Alger	5–0 (5–0 agg.)	ASN Nigelec (Niger)	Douéra
20:00 UTC+1	Konaté 17'; Salaou 68' (o.g.); Bangoura 76'; Boukholda 78'; Nduwumwe 82'	Report		Stadium: Ali La Pointe Stadium; Referee: Sabri Mohamed Fadul (Sudan)

===== Second round =====
18 October 2026 First leg	(Nigeria) Rangers	2–0	MC Alger (Algeria)	Abeokuta
14:00 UTC+1	Igboke 87' (pen.); Emo 90'	Report		Stadium: MKO Abiola Stadium; Referee: Washington Dolo (Liberia)

23 October 2026 Second leg	(Algeria) MC Alger	3–0 (3–2 agg.)	Rangers (Nigeria)	Douéra
20:00 UTC+1	Boukholda 58'; Bangoura 84'; Bayazid 90+2'	Report		Stadium: Ali La Pointe Stadium; Referee: David Molise (Lesotho)

==== Group stage ====
The draw for the group stage was held on 28 October 2026, 12:00 GMT (15:00 local time, UTC+3), at the Egyptian Football Association headquarters in Cairo, Egypt.. The 16 winners of the second round will be drawn into four groups of four. The teams will be seeded by their performances in the CAF competitions for the previous five seasons (CAF 5-year ranking points shown next to every team). Each group will contain one team from each of Pot 1 and Pot 2, Pot 3 and Pot 4, and each team will be allocated to the positions in their group according to their pot.

27–29 November 2026 1	Young Africans (Tanzania)	–	(Algeria) MC Alger	Dar es Salaam
: UTC+3		Report		Stadium: Chamazi Stadium

4–6 December 2026 2	MC Alger (Algeria)	–	(Egypt) Zamalek	Douéra
: UTC+1		Report		Stadium: Ali La Pointe Stadium

18–20 December 2026 3	Club Africain (Tunisia)	–	(Algeria) MC Alger	Tunis
: UTC+1		Report		Stadium: Hammadi Agrebi Stadium

8–10 January 2027 4	MC Alger (Algeria)	–	(Tunisia) Club Africain	Douéra
: UTC+1		Report		Stadium: Ali La Pointe Stadium

15–17 January 2027 5	MC Alger (Algeria)	–	(Tanzania) Young Africans	Douéra
: UTC+1		Report		Stadium: Ali La Pointe Stadium

22–24 January 2027 6	Zamalek (Egypt)	–	(Algeria) MC Alger	Cairo
: UTC+2		Report		Stadium: Cairo International Stadium

== Squad information ==
=== Appearances and goals ===
As of 8 November 2026

No.	Pos	Player	Nat	Ligue 1			Algerian Cup			Super Cup			Champions League			Total		
No.	Pos	Player	Nat	App	St	G	App	St	G	App	St	G	App	St	G	App	St	G
Goalkeepers
1	GK	Abdelatif Ramdane	(Algeria)	7	7	0	0	0	0	0	0	0	4	4	0	0	0	0
16	GK	Yassine Gourari Tebaa	(Algeria)	1	1	0	0	0	0	0	0	0	0	0	0	0	0	0
30	GK	Mastias Hammache	(Algeria)	0	0	0	0	0	0	0	0	0	0	0	0	0	0	0
Defenders
2	RB	Yakoub Gassi	(Algeria)	4	1	0	0	0	0	0	0	0	2	1	0	0	0	0
3	LB	Marwane Khelif	(Algeria)	4	4	0	0	0	0	0	0	0	3	2	0	0	0	0
5	CB	Ayoub Abdellaoui	(Algeria)	5	4	0	0	0	0	0	0	0	2	2	0	0	0	0
19	CB	Ayoub Ghezala	(Algeria)	8	8	0	0	0	0	0	0	0	4	4	0	0	0	0
20	RB	Réda Halaïmia	(Algeria)	8	7	0	0	0	0	0	0	0	4	3	0	0	0	0
25	RB	Aimen Bouguerra	(Algeria)	0	0	0	0	0	0	0	0	0	0	0	0	0	0	0
26	LB	Yacine Chaib	(Algeria)	0	0	0	0	0	0	0	0	0	0	0	0	0	0	0
27	CB	Abdelkader Menezla	(Algeria)	6	5	0	0	0	0	0	0	0	2	2	0	0	0	0
32	CB	Daniel Mehdid	(Algeria)	1	0	0	0	0	0	0	0	0	0	0	0	0	0	0
Midfielders
4	AM	Abdelouahab Satta	(Algeria)	2	0	0	0	0	0	0	0	0	0	0	0	0	0	0
6	DM	Mohamed Benkhemassa	(Algeria)	5	2	0	0	0	0	0	0	0	2	0	0	0	0	0
12	DM	Mohamed Zougrana	(Burkina Faso)	6	4	0	0	0	0	0	0	0	2	2	0	0	0	0
17	AM	Chahreddine Boukholda	(Algeria)	7	6	1	0	0	0	0	0	0	4	0	2	0	0	0
21	AM	Mohamed Islam Abdelkader	(Algeria)	7	4	0	0	0	0	0	0	0	4	3	0	0	0	0
23	CM	Merouane Mehdaoui	(Algeria)	7	6	0	0	0	0	0	0	0	2	2	0	0	0	0
28	AM	Oussama Benhaoua	(Algeria)	8	7	0	0	0	0	0	0	0	3	3	0	0	0	0
Forwards
7	ST	Sofiane Bayazid	(Algeria)	3	0	1	0	0	0	0	0	0	4	0	1	0	0	0
8	RW	Zinedine Ferhat	(Algeria)	6	6	1	0	0	0	0	0	0	3	3	0	0	0	0
10	RW	Ali Azaizeh	(Jordan)	2	2	0	0	0	0	0	0	0	2	0	0	0	0	0
11	RW	Mossi Nduwumwe	(Burundi)	3	2	0	0	0	0	0	0	0	1	0	1	0	0	0
13	ST	Yacine Hamadouche	(Algeria)	0	0	0	0	0	0	0	0	0	2	2	0	0	0	0
14	ST	Ben Ahmed Kohili	(Algeria)	5	0	2	0	0	0	0	0	0	3	2	0	0	0	0
15	RW	Mehdi Boucherit	(Algeria)	2	0	0	0	0	0	0	0	0	1	0	0	0	0	0
18	ST	Mohamed Saliou Bangoura	(Guinea)	8	7	0	0	0	0	0	0	0	4	4	2	0	0	0
22	ST	Siriman Konaté	(Algeria)	8	5	1	0	0	0	0	0	0	3	3	1	0	0	0
24	RW	Zakaria Naidji	(Algeria)	4	3	0	0	0	0	0	0	0	4	4	0	0	0	0
Total				7		9	0		0	0		0	4		8	0		0

Last updated: 8 November 2026
Source: soccerway.com

=== Goalscorers ===
As of 19 November 2026

No.	Nat.	Player	Pos.	L1	AC	SC	CL	TOTAL
19	(Algeria)	Ayoub Ghezala	CB	3	0	0	0	3
17	(Algeria)	Chahreddine Boukholda	AM	1	0	0	2	3
14	(Algeria)	Ben Ahmed Kohili	ST	2	0	0	0	2
18	(Guinea)	Mohamed Saliou Bangoura	ST	0	0	0	2	2
22	(Algeria)	Siriman Konaté	ST	1	0	0	1	2
7	(Algeria)	Sofiane Bayazid	ST	1	0	0	1	2
11	(Burundi)	Mossi Nduwumwe	RW	0	0	0	1	1
8	(Algeria)	Zinedine Ferhat	RW	1	0	0	0	1
Own Goals				0	0	0	1	1
Totals				9	0	0	8	17

=== Clean sheets ===
As of 19 November 2026

					Clean sheets				
No.	Nat	Name	GP	GA	L1	AC	SC	CL	Total
1	(Algeria)	Abdelatif Ramdane	11	5	4	0	0	4	6
16	(Algeria)	Yassine Gourari Tebaa	1	0	1	0	0	0	1
30	(Algeria)	Mastias Hammache	0	0	0	0	0	0	0
		TOTALS		5	5	0	0	3	8
