= Abdelatif Ramdane =

Algerian footballer (born 2001)

Personal information
- Date of birth: 19 May 2001 (age 25)
- Place of birth: Hadjout, Algeria
- Height: 1.90 m (6 ft 3 in)
- Position: Goalkeeper

Team information
- Current team: MC Alger
- Number: 1

Senior career*
Years	Team	Apps	(Gls)
2020–2022	JS Kabylie	4	(0)
2022–	MC Alger	43	(0)

International career^{‡}
2019	Algeria U20	1	(0)
2023	Algeria U23	1	(0)
2026–	Algeria	1	(0)
- * Club domestic league appearances and goals as of 5 June 2026 ‡ National team caps and goals as of 6 October 2026

Abdelatif Ramdane (Arabic: عبد اللطيف رمضان, born 19 May 2001) is an Algerian professional footballer who plays as a goalkeeper for MC Alger and the Algeria national team.

== Career ==
=== Club career ===
During the 2019–20 season, Abdelatif Ramdane was promoted to the adult category at MC Alger. On August 31, 2020, Ramdane signed up with JS Kabylie for a three-season contract.

=== International career ===
Ramdane made his debut for Algeria national team on 6 October 2026 in friendly against Niger.

== Career statistics ==
=== Club ===
As of 5 June 2026

Club	Season	League			Cup		Continental		Other		Total	
Club	Season	Division	Apps	Goals	Apps	Goals	Apps	Goals	Apps	Goals	Apps	Goals
MC Alger	2023–24	Ligue 1	10	0	5	0	—		—		14	0
MC Alger	2024–25	Ligue 1	17	0	2	0	9 (Note: All appearance(s) in Champions League)	0	1 (Note: All appearances in Algerian Super Cup)	0	29	0
MC Alger	2025–26	Ligue 1	16	0	1	0	0	0	0	0	17	0
MC Alger	2026–27	Ligue 1	0	0	0	0	0	0	0	0	0	0
Total			43	0	8	0	9	0	1	0	61	0
Career total			43	0	8	0	9	0	1	0	61	0

== Honours ==
=== Clubs ===
MC Alger

- Algerian Ligue Professionnelle 1: 2023–24, 2024–25, 2025–26
- Algerian Super Cup: 2024, 2025
