= 2025 Algerian Super Cup =

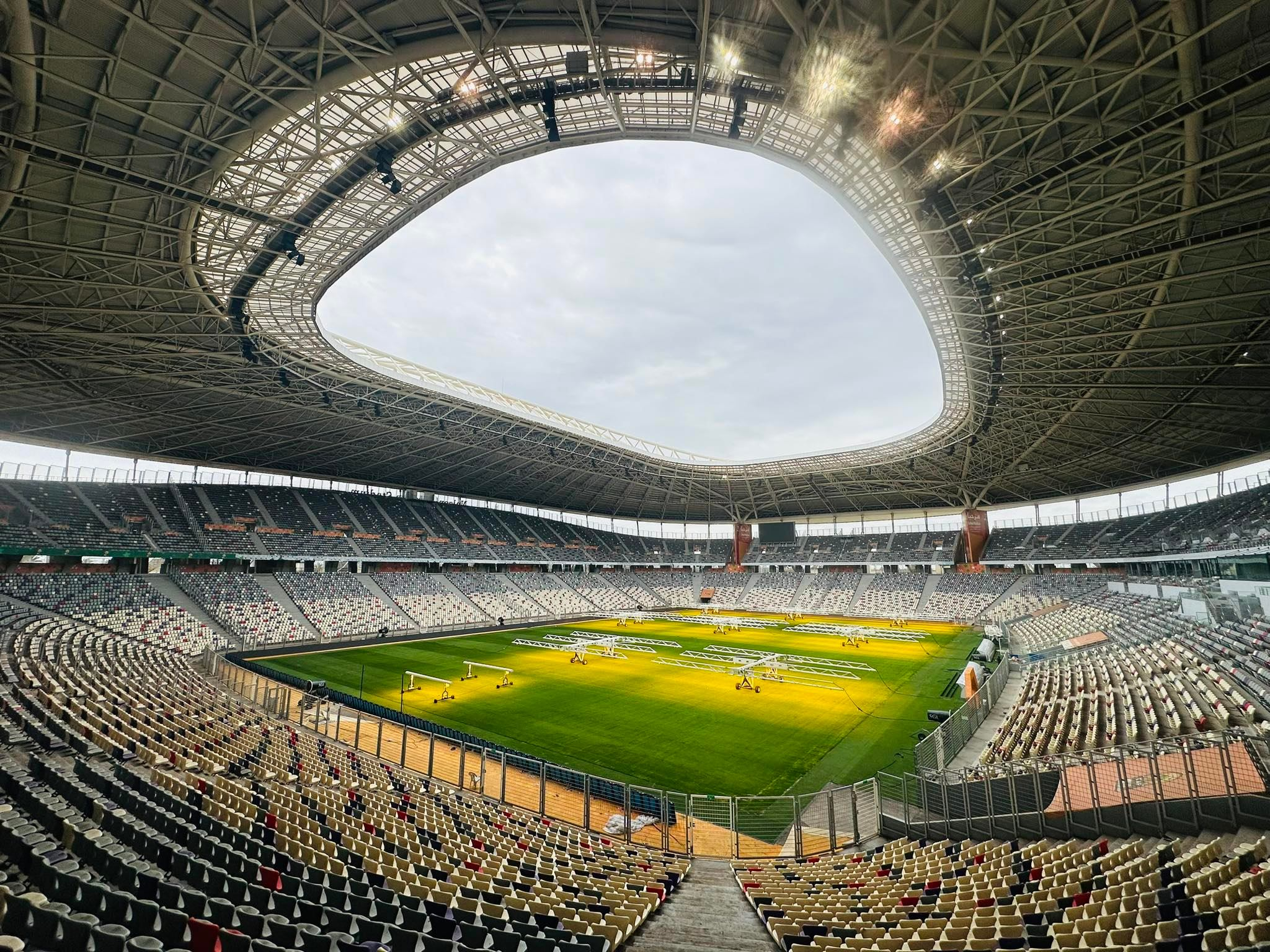
- Nelson Mandela Stadium hosted the match
MC Alger	USM Alger
Ligue 1	Algerian Cup
1	0
- Date: 17 January 2026
- Venue: Nelson Mandela Stadium, Baraki
- Referee: Anes Azrine
- Attendance: 20,000

The 2025 Algerian Super Cup was the 15th edition of the Algerian Super Cup, a football match contested by the winners of the 2024–25 Ligue 1 and 2024–25 Algerian Cup competitions. The match was played on 17 January 2026, between 2024–25 Ligue 1 winners MC Alger and 2024–25 Algerian Cup winners USM Alger.

== Match ==
=== Pre-match ===
The match officials appointed for the 2025 Mobilis Algerian Super Cup, contested between MC Alger and USM Alger on 17 January 2026 at the Nelson Mandela Stadium, were Anes Azrine (referee), assisted by Mohamed Klikha and Abdelkader Slimani. Mehdi Oukil served as fourth official, with Amine Belaroussi as reserve assistant referee, Alaa Bouab as Video assistant referee (VAR), and Anouar Ghazli as Assistant video assistant referees (AVAR).

=== Summary ===
MC Alger won the 2025 edition of the Algerian Super Cup after defeating their rivals USM Alger 1–0. After a balanced first half (0–0), the decisive moment came in the 74th minute when Zakaria Naidji scored the only goal of the match with a well-placed header at the near post, following a cross from the right wing. Overall, MC Alger were the more threatening side. They created an early chance in the 1st minute through Moslem Anatouf, who found himself one-on-one with goalkeeper Oussama Benbot, but the latter reacted well to deny him. Further opportunities followed, including a direct free-kick from Réda Halaïmia (26’) that went just over, and a powerful volley from Chahreddine Boukholda that was brilliantly saved by Benbot. In the second half, MC Alger maintained their attacking edge and were eventually rewarded with Naidji’s goal. USM Alger pushed forward in the final 15 minutes, relying on substitutes like Ahmed Khaldi and Aimé Junior, but they were unable to break through a well-organized defense. This victory gives MC Alger their fifth Algerian Super Cup title (after 2006, 2007, 2014, and 2024), while USM Alger suffered their fourth defeat in the competition, despite winning it twice in 2013 and 2016.

== Match details ==
17 January 2026
17:00

MC Alger	1–0	USM Alger
Naidji 74'	Report

Nelson Mandela Stadium, Baraki
Referee: Anes Azrine

MC Alger	USM Alger

GK	26	(Algeria) Alexis Guendouz	(yellow card) 90+4'
CB	5	(Algeria) Ayoub Abdellaoui (c)	(yellow card) 65'
CB	19	(Algeria) Ayoub Ghezala
RB	20	(Algeria) Réda Halaïmia
LB	25	(Algeria) Aimen Bouguerra
DM	6	(Algeria) Mohamed Benkhemassa
AM	17	(Algeria) Chahreddine Boukholda		(substituted off) 69'
AM	28	(Algeria) Oussama Benhaoua	(yellow card) 59'	(substituted off) 86'
RW	8	(Algeria) Zinedine Ferhat		(substituted off) 86'
ST	37	(Algeria) Moslem Anatouf		(substituted off) 63'
ST	7	(Algeria) Sofiane Bayazid		(substituted off) 63'
Substitutes :
GK	40	(Algeria) Mastias Hammache
CB	2	(Algeria) Rostom Dendaoui
LB	3	(Algeria) Marwane Khelif
CB	27	(Algeria) Abdelkader Menezla		(substituted on) 86'
AM	10	(Algeria) Alhassane Bangoura
DM	12	(Ivory Coast) Mohamed Zougrana		(substituted on) 86'
LW	22	(Ivory Coast) Kipre Junior		(substituted on) 63'
RW	24	(Algeria) Zakaria Naidji		(substituted on) 69'
RW	29	(Algeria) Amine Messoussa	(yellow card) 90'	(substituted on) 63'
Manager :
(South Africa) Rhulani Mokwena

GK	25	(Algeria) Oussama Benbot
CB	4	(Cameroon) Adam Alilet
CB	13	(Algeria) Hocine Dehiri
RB	19	(Algeria) Saâdi Radouani (c)		(substituted off) 60'
LB	12	(Algeria) Haithem Loucif
DM	6	(Algeria) Zakaria Draoui	(yellow card) 70'
DM	14	(Algeria) Brahim Benzaza		(substituted off) 66'
AM	8	(Algeria) Islam Merili	(yellow card) 90+4'
AM	11	(Democratic Republic of the Congo) Glody Likonza
ST	27	(Algeria) Houssam Ghacha
ST	29	(Ivory Coast) Dramane Kamagaté		(substituted off) 66'
Substitutes:
GK	16	(Algeria) Kamel Soufi
CB	3	(Algeria) Safi Eddine Atamnia		(substituted on) 66'
LB	23	(Algeria) Ilyes Chetti
AM	26	(Algeria) Omar Boularas
AM	30	(Senegal) Aimé Tendeng		(substituted on) 66'
RW	7	(Algeria) Ahmed Khaldi		(substituted on) 66'
LW	17	(Algeria) Khaled Bousseliou
LW	24	(Algeria) Mohamed Bouderbala
ST	9	(Algeria) Riad Benayad
Manager :
(Algeria) Abdelhak Benchikha

Assistant referees:
Mohamed Klikha
Abdelkader Slimani
Fourth official:
Mehdi Oukil
Video assistant referee:
Alaa Bouab
Assistant video assistant referees:
Anouar Ghazli

Match rules
- 90 minutes.
- Penalty shoot-out if scores level.
- Nine named substitutes, of which up to five may be used.

== See also ==
- 2024–25 Algerian Ligue Professionnelle 1
- 2024–25 Algerian Cup
