= Ayoub Abdellaoui =

Algerian footballer (born 1993)

Personal information
- Full name: Ayoub Abdellaoui
- Date of birth: February 16, 1993 (age 33)
- Place of birth: Reghaïa, Algiers, Algeria
- Height: 1.87 m (6 ft 2 in)
- Position: Defender

Team information
- Current team: MC Alger
- Number: 5

Youth career
- 2011–2013: USM Alger

Senior career*
| Years | Team | Apps | (Gls) |
| 2013–2018 | USM Alger | 66 | (1) |
| 2018–2021 | FC Sion | 70 | (2) |
| 2021–2022 | Ettifaq FC | 22 | (0) |
| 2022– | MC Alger | 84 | (4) |

International career^{‡}
| 2011–2013 | Algeria U20 | 10 | (0) |
| 2014–2016 | Algeria U23 | 19 | (0) |
| 2017–2023 | Algeria | 6 | (0) |
Medal record
Men's football
Representing Algeria
FIFA Arab Cup
| Winner | 2021 Qatar |
- * Club domestic league appearances and goals as of 26 December 2025 ‡ National team caps and goals as of 25 June 2020

Ayoub Abdellaoui (Arabic: أيوب عبد اللاوي; born 16 February 1993 in Reghaïa, Algiers) is an Algerian professional footballer who plays for MC Alger and the Algeria national team. He plays as both a central defender and left-back.

== Club career ==
On 3 January 2018, six months before the end of his contract with USM Alger, Abdellaoui signed a three-year contract with Swiss club FC Sion, beginning from 1 July 2018.

On 29 August 2021, Abdellaoui joined Saudi Arabian club Al-Ettifaq. On 12 July 2022, Abdellaoui joined MC Alger.

== International career ==
In 2013, Abdellaoui was part of the Algeria under-20 national team at the 2013 African U-20 Championship. Two years later, he was part of the Algeria under-23 national team at the 2015 U-23 Africa Cup of Nations in Senegal.

== Career statistics ==
=== Club ===
As of 23 June 2026

Appearances and goals by club, season and competition
| Club | Season | League | | | Cup | | Other | | Continental | | Total | |
| Club | Season | Division | Apps | Goals | Apps | Goals | Apps | Goals | Apps | Goals | Apps | Goals |
|---|---|---|---|---|---|---|---|---|---|---|---|---|
| USM Alger | 2013–14 | Ligue 1 | 1 | 0 | — | | — | | — | | 1 | 0 |
| USM Alger | 2014–15 | Ligue 1 | 5 | 0 | — | | — | | 4 (Note: All appearance(s) in CAF Champions League) | 0 | 9 | 0 |
| USM Alger | 2015–16 | Ligue 1 | 17 | 0 | — | | — | | 2 | 0 | 19 | 0 |
| USM Alger | 2016–17 | Ligue 1 | 20 | 0 | 2 | 0 | 1 (Note: Appearance in Super Cup) | 0 | 4 | 1 | 27 | 1 |
| USM Alger | 2017–18 | Ligue 1 | 23 | 1 | 2 | 0 | — | | 13 (Note: seven appearances and one goal in Champions League, six appearances in Confederation Cup) | 1 | 38 | 2 |
| USM Alger | Total | | 66 | 1 | 4 | 0 | 1 | 0 | 23 | 2 | 94 | 3 |
| FC Sion | 2018–19 | Swiss Super League | 19 | 0 | 2 | 0 | — | | — | | 21 | 0 |
| FC Sion | 2019–20 | Swiss Super League | 25 | 0 | 2 | 0 | — | | — | | 27 | 0 |
| FC Sion | 2020–21 | Swiss Super League | 24 | 2 | 4 | 0 | — | | — | | 28 | 2 |
| FC Sion | Total | | 68 | 2 | 8 | 0 | — | | — | | 76 | 2 |
| Ettifaq FC | 2021–22 | Saudi Professional League | 22 | 0 | 1 | 0 | — | | — | | 23 | 0 |
| MC Alger | 2022–23 | Ligue 1 | 26 | 1 | 1 | 0 | — | | — | | 27 | 1 |
| MC Alger | 2023–24 | Ligue 1 | 28 | 2 | 4 | 1 | — | | — | | 32 | 3 |
| MC Alger | 2024–25 | Ligue 1 | 21 | 1 | 2 | 0 | 1 | 1 | 11 | 1 | 35 | 3 |
| MC Alger | 2025–26 | Ligue 1 | 21 | 0 | 3 | 0 | 1 | 0 | 10 | 1 | 35 | 1 |
| MC Alger | 2026–27 | Ligue 1 | 0 | 0 | 0 | 0 | 0 | 0 | 0 | 0 | 0 | 0 |
| MC Alger | Total | | 96 | 4 | 10 | 1 | 2 | 1 | 21 | 2 | 129 | 8 |
| Career total | | | 252 | 7 | 23 | 1 | 3 | 1 | 44 | 4 | 322 | 13 |

== Honours ==
USM Alger

- Algerian Ligue Professionnelle 1: 2015-16
- Algerian Super Cup: 2016

MC Alger

- Algerian Ligue Professionnelle 1: 2023–24, 2024–25, 2025–26
- Algerian Super Cup: 2024, 2025

Algeria

- FIFA Arab Cup: 2021
