= Mohamed Saliou Bangoura =

Guinean footballer

Mohamed Bangoura
Personal information
- Full name: Mohamed Saliou Bangoura
- Date of birth: 10 June 2004 (age 22)
- Place of birth: Guinea
- Position: Striker

Team information
- Current team: MC Alger
- Number: 18

Senior career*
Years	Team	Apps	(Gls)
–2025	Hafia FC	0	(0)
2025–	MC Alger	39	(19)

International career^{‡}
2024	Guinea A	2	(2)
2024–	Guinea	1	(0)
- * Club domestic league appearances and goals as of 5 June 2026 ‡ National team caps and goals as of 21 March 2025

Mohamed Saliou Bangoura (born 10 June 2004) is a professional footballer who plays as a striker for MC Alger in the Algerian Ligue Professionnelle 1 and the Guinea national team.

== Club career ==
Mohamed Saliou Bangoura's profile is attracting interest across the African continent. In addition to MC Alger, Club Africain of Tunis and Al Hilal of Sudan are monitoring the young striker. Regarded as a talent of his generation in Guinea, in the 2023–24 season Bangoura scored 20 goals and provided 14 assists in 27 matches across all competitions with Hafia FC. These stats resulted in a call-up to Guinea's senior national team for the 2025 AFCON qualifiers.

=== MC Alger ===
I’m very happy to sign with Mouloudia Club d’Alger it’s a dream come true. This great club has big ambitions, and I’m confident we’ll achieve much together, Inshallah. Mouloudia is well-structured and always competes at a high level. I carry this club in my heart and will give my all to help it succeed. I’m forever grateful to Hafia FC, my family, for everything they gave me.

— Mohamed Saliou Bangoura on signing with MC Alger.

Mohamed Saliou Bangoura is no longer a player of Hafia FC. After several days of uncertainty, the striker officially joined Mouloudia Club d’Alger on February 5, 2025. The club announced the signing on its Facebook page, welcoming the former ASFAG player. The transfer fee is estimated at $400,000, with a 30% sell on clause. Bangoura, also known as Aloba, signed a for year contract and will earn a monthly salary of $25,000. Bangoura expressed his happiness about reaching this important milestone in his career. After making a strong impression in the Guinean league over the past two years, Bangoura leaves his home country and domestic championship.

In his first appearance for MC Alger in the Ligue 1, newcomer Bangoura made an immediate impact by scoring the team's second goal, securing a valuable 2–1 win over CS Constantine on February 28, 2025. Bangoura was included in the starting lineup and delivered an impressive performance in midfield, playing a decisive role throughout the match. His strong showing justified the confidence placed in him by the coaching staff. On May 19, 2025, Bangoura delivered a standout performance in MC Alger's dominant 4–1 victory over ES Sétif, playing a decisive role with two goals and one assist. This marks the first brace of his career with the club and one of his most complete displays so far. His timing couldn't be better, stepping up as a key figure just when his team needs it most.

On July 23, 2025, Saliou Bangoura suffered a serious injury to his left ankle during a training session with MC Alger. Bangoura was immediately taken to the hospital for further tests after the incident raised concern among staff and teammates. The club's doctor later confirmed that the injury requires surgery and that Bangoura will be out of action for three months. While it is a significant setback, the medical team reassures that the injury is not career threatening and that the player is expected to come back stronger after recovery.

== International career ==
Guinea national team coach Charles Paquille called up Mohamed Saliou Bangoura for the first time for the 2025 Africa Cup of Nations qualifiers against DR Congo and Tanzania. Bangoura made his official debut as a substitute in the match against DR Congo, which took place on September 6, 2024.

== Career statistics ==
=== Club ===
As of 16 June 2026

Club	Season	League			Cup		Continental		Other		Total	
Club	Season	Division	Apps	Goals	Apps	Goals	Apps	Goals	Apps	Goals	Apps	Goals
MC Alger	2024–25	Ligue 1	13	7	0	0	2 (Note: All appearance(s) in Champions League)	0	—		15	7
MC Alger	2025–26	Ligue 1	19	10	3	1	0	0	1 (Note: All appearances in Algerian Super Cup)	0	22	11
MC Alger	2026–27	Ligue 1	1	0	0	0	2	1	0	0	3	1
MC Alger	Total		32	17	3	1	4	1	1	0	39	19
Career total			32	17	3	1	4	1	1	0	39	19

=== International ===
As of match played 28 December 2024

Appearances and goals by national team and year
National team	Year	Apps	Goals
Guinea	2024	3	2
Total		3	2

Scores and results list Algeria's goal tally first.

List of international goals scored by Mohamed Saliou Bangour
No.	Date	Venue	Opponent	Score	Result	Competition
1.	20 December 2024	Felix Houphouet Boigny Stadium, Abidjan, Ivory Coast	Guinea-Bissau	2–1	4–1	CHAN 2024 Qualification
2.	28 December 2024	Estádio 24 de Setembro, Bissau, Guinea-Bissau	Guinea-Bissau	1–1	1–2	CHAN 2024 Qualification

== Honours ==
MC Alger

- Algerian Ligue Professionnelle 1: 2024-25
