= MC Alger Centre d'entraînement et de formation =

Training ground of MC Alger

Training Center & Headquarters Abderrahmane Aouf - Baba Hammoud
- Artist's rendering
- Location: Zéralda; Algiers
- Owner: MC Alger
- Type: Football training ground

Construction
- Groundbreaking: 27 April 2021
- Built: 2021–2024
- Opened: 27 February 2025
- Cost: 1,4 billion dinar

Tenant
- MC Alger (training) (2024–)

The Training Center & Headquarters Abderrahmane Aouf - Baba Hammoud is the training ground and academy base of Algerian football club MC Alger. The club is located in Zéralda in the western suburbs of Algiers.

== Construction ==
On April 27, 2021, the work of the MC Alger Centre d'entraînement et de formation, located in Zéralda, will begin after the month of Ramadan. After a first meeting, a second meeting at the headquarters of the Wilaya of Algiers, chaired by the wali, brought together representatives of the executive departments, the CEO of Sonatrach, the general director of the GCB company, as well as the president of the municipality of Zéralda, to try to find urgent solutions to the administrative situation which will allow the start of work on the MC Alger Centre d'entraînement et de formation after the month of Ramadan indicated the "Doyen" on his official Facebook page. Mouloudia had regularized the acquisition of the Zéralda land in July 2020, while the construction work was due to begin in September of the same year, before it was slowed down by "the reaction of farmers living nearby, who opposed it twice, believing that they would not be compensated by the State after the acquisition of this land by MC Alger. MC Alger paid 80 billion centimes to acquire the land of Zeralda, with an area of 4 hectares. The project was to be received in August 2021, a period coinciding with the celebration of the hundredth anniversary of the creation of the Algiers club.

MC Alger Centre d'entraînement et de formation has risen from the ground better yet, he's moving forward with sure steps. According to an internal source, it should be ready by the end of the current year. The photo of the chairman of the board of directors of the MCA from the top of a glass building alone symbolizes the state of progress of the training and training center of the MC Alger in Zéralda. According to an authorized source, this complex, which will include an administrative building, a hotel, two conference rooms and two training fields, one of which will be made of hybrid grass, will be ready in December 2023.

== Handover and opening ==
The technical sports director (DTS) Mohamed Mekhazni, announced that the club's Centre d'entraînement et de formation should be inaugurated at the end of January 2024. It is a structure that will be the HQ for all categories of the club, from the first team to the youth. It will also house the administrative headquarters.

== Facilities ==
- Pitch 1: (105 x 65 metres)
- Pitch 2: (105 x 65 metres)
