= Chahreddine Boukholda =

Algerian footballer (born 1996)

Personal information
- Date of birth: 24 May 1996 (age 30)
- Place of birth: Marseille, France
- Height: 1.84 m (6 ft 0 in)
- Position: Attacking midfielder

Team information
- Current team: MC Alger
- Number: 17

Youth career
- 2011–2015: Monaco

Senior career*
Years	Team	Apps	(Gls)
2015–2017	Monaco II	30	(2)
2017–2019	Lille II	40	(4)
2019–2021	Belenenses SAD	18	(4)
2021–2022	Mafra	12	(2)
2023	Arda Kardzhali	6	(0)
2023–2024	Etar Veliko Tarnovo	21	(2)
2024–2025	MC Oran	30	(7)
2026–	MC Alger	9	(0)
- * Club domestic league appearances and goals as of 5 June 2026

Chahreddine "Chano" Boukholda (Arabic: شهر الدين بوخلدة; born 24 May 1996) is a French professional footballer who plays as an attacking midfielder for MC Alger.

== Personal life ==
Born in Marseille, France to Algerian parents from Oran, Boukholda holds both Algerian and French nationalities.

== Career ==
Boukholda began playing football at SC Air Bel in Marseille. He is a youth product of Monaco, who moved to Lille in 2017. On 29 July 2019, Boukholda transferred to Belenenses SAD. Boukholda made his professional debut with Belenenses SAD in a 3-2 Primeira Liga loss to S.L. Benfica on 31 January 2020. In June 2023, he joined newly promoted Bulgarian club Etar Veliko Tarnovo. On 16 July 2024, he joined Algerian club MC Oran. On 3 January 2026, he joined MC Alger.

== Career statistics ==
=== Club ===
As of 3 January 2026

Appearances and goals by club, season and competition
Club	Season	League				Cup (Note: Includes Taça de Portugal, Bulgarian Cup and Algerian Cup.)			League cup (Note: Includes Taça da Liga.)			Continental			Other			Total		
Club	Season	Division	Apps	Goals	Ass.	Apps	Goals	Ass.	Apps	Goals	Ass.	Apps	Goals	Ass.	Apps	Goals	Ass.	Apps	Goals	Ass.
AS Monaco II	2015–16	CFA	15	1	0	—												15	1	0
AS Monaco II	2016–17	CFA	15	1	0	—												15	1	0
AS Monaco II	Total		30	2	0	—												30	2	0
Lille OSC II	2017–18	National 2	20	1	0	—												20	1	0
Lille OSC II	2018–19	National 2	20	3	10	—												20	3	10
Lille OSC II	Total		40	4	10	—												40	4	10
Belenenses SAD/B-SAD	2019–20	Primeira Liga	16	4	0	—												16	4	0
Belenenses SAD/B-SAD	2020–21	Primeira Liga	2	0	0	—												2	0	0
Belenenses SAD/B-SAD	Total		18	4	0	—												18	4	0
CD Mafra	2021–22	Liga Portugal 2	12	2	1	2	0	0	1	0	0	—						15	2	1
FC Arda Kardzhali	2022–23	First League	6	0	1	1	0	0	—									7	0	1
SFC Etar Veliko Tarnovo	2023–24	First League	21	2	1	2	3	0	—									23	5	1
MC Oran	2024–25	Ligue Pro. 1	17	3	2	1	0	0	—									18	3	2
MC Oran	2025–26	Ligue Pro. 1	13	4	0	1	0	0	—									14	4	0
MC Oran	Total		30	7	2	2	0	0	—									32	7	2
Career total			157	21	15	6	3	0	1	0	0	—						165	24	15
