= Ali La Pointe Stadium =

Stadium currently under construction in Douéra, Algeria

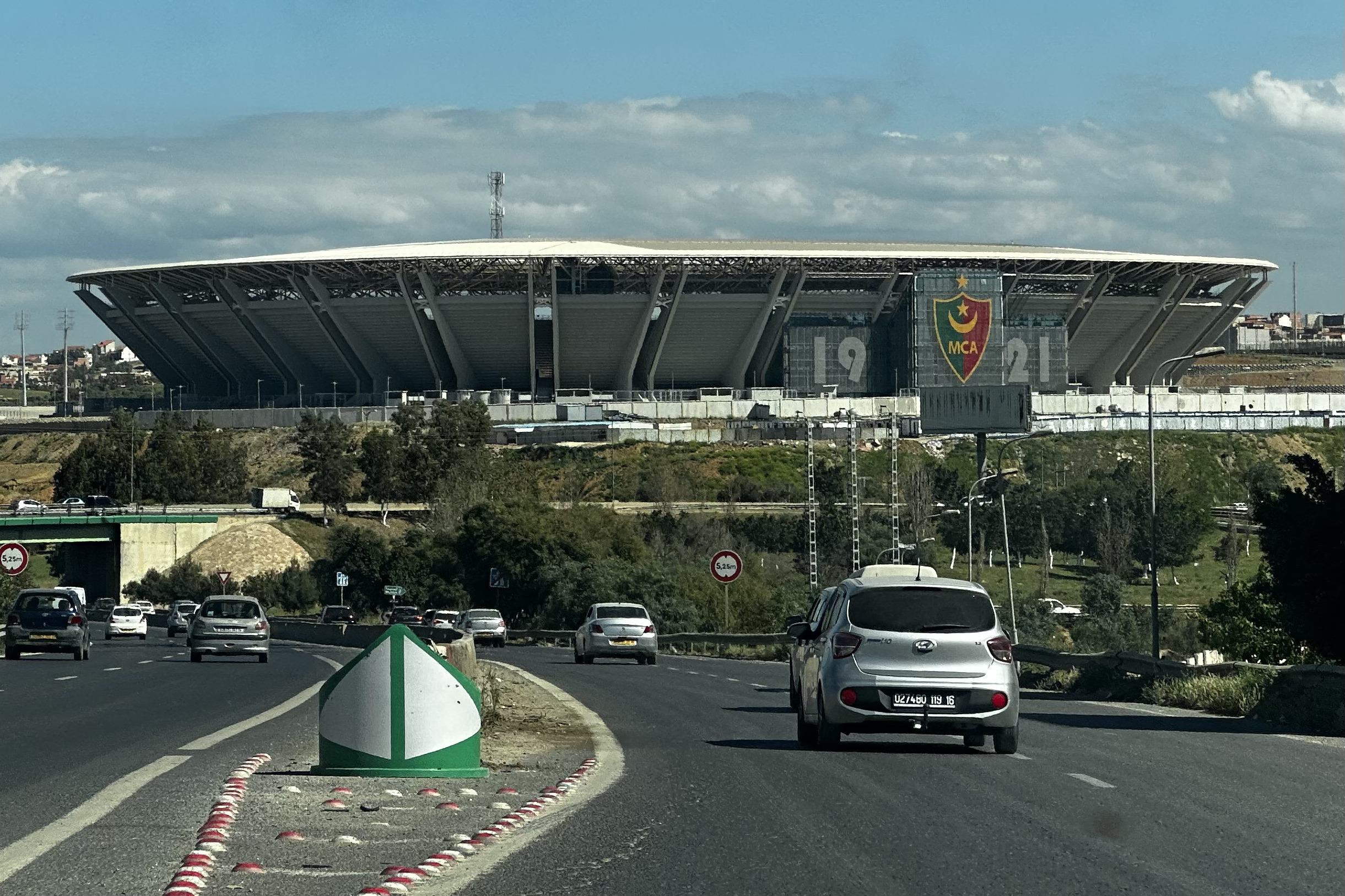
- Interactive map of Ali La Pointe Stadium
- Location: 2eme Rocade d'Alger; Douéra, Algiers, Algeria
- Coordinates: 36°40′53″N 2°57′42″E
- Owner: Wilaya d'Alger
- Operator: MC ALGER
- Capacity: 40,000; 37,144 Audience; 2,700 VIP & VVIP; 156 Press
- Surface: Grass
- Field size: 105 by 68 metres (115 by 74 yd)

Construction
- Groundbreaking: 2010
- Opened: 3 July 2024
- Cost: 87.5 Million United States dollar
- Architects: Studio Altieri & GMP

Tenant
- MC Alger

Ali La Pointe Stadium (Arabic: ملعب علي لابوانت), is a 40,000-capacity stadium in Douéra, Algeria, a suburb of Algiers. It is expected to serve as the home stadium of MC Alger.

== Construction ==
Works were to commence in 2010 and end in 2012 by a Chinese company with a capacity of 40,000 spectators, but it was delayed due to administrative problem on the land on which it was to be built. The floor was changed to start the work officially in July 2014 and by 2018 works were completed on the first floor, after which work commenced on the second floor, which was carried out fast compared to the first floor or other new stadiums due to the spread of Coronavirus in China, Algerian officials stated that there may be delays in handing over the stadium, since most of the workers are from China.

On August 8, 2021, the President of the Republic, Abdelmadjid Tebboune announced that the management of the new stadium will be for MC Alger as he recalled the founding of the Club on August 7, 1921, by the late Abderrahmane Aouf. The rate of progress of the stadium's work has reached around 55%, according to the 2020 activity report presented last February by the Ministry of Youth and Sports. For several years, several Algerian clubs including USM Alger, CR Belouizdad and MC Alger have been asking that one of the two new football stadiums under construction in Baraki and Douéra be awarded to them. In December 2022, work began to raise the stadium screens, which will be two giant screens, and also start installing chairs where the red and green colors were chosen.

On November 2, 2023, the President of the Republic Abdelmadjid Tebboune announced that the stadium would be named Ali Ammar, also known as Ali La Pointe, hero of the Battle of Algiers. On May 3, 2024, The Minister of Housing, Urban Planning and the city, made an unannounced visit to Ali La Pointe Stadium to inquire about the progress of work on this project. he began his visit with the inspection of the control center, whose work on the exterior facade had been completed, which specifies that the center has five floors, with a presidential and VIP lounge and a press area on the first level, offices administrative offices and accommodation for players on the second and third floors and control rooms, the beating heart of the center, on the top floor. Mohamed Tarek Belaribi also ordered the maintenance of the 3x8 system, specifying that more than 800 workers were currently working on the site.

=== Handover and opening ===
On July 3, 2024, Ali La Pointe Stadium in Douéra was officially inaugurated by the President of the Republic Abdelmadjid Tebboune. The stadium should host MC Alger matches from the start of the 2024–25 season.

== See also ==
- List of football stadiums in Algeria
- List of African stadiums by capacity
- List of association football stadiums by capacity
