= Réda Halaïmia =

Algerian footballer (born 1996)

Personal information
- Full name: Mohamed Réda Halaïmia
- Date of birth: 28 August 1996 (age 30)
- Place of birth: Oran, Algeria
- Height: 1.79 m (5 ft 10 in)
- Position: Defender

Team information
- Current team: MC Alger
- Number: 20

Youth career
- 2012–2015: MC Oran

Senior career*
| Years | Team | Apps | (Gls) |
| 2015–2019 | MC Oran | 95 | (0) |
| 2019–2022 | Beerschot | 63 | (1) |
| 2022– | MC Alger | 109 | (7) |

International career^{‡}
| 2016 | Algeria U23 | 5 | (0) |
| 2018 | Algeria A' | 1 | (0) |
| 2018– | Algeria | 4 | (0) |
- * Club domestic league appearances and goals as of 5 June 2026 ‡ National team caps and goals as of 13 November 2020

Mohamed Réda Halaïmia (Arabic: محمد رضا حلايمية; born 28 August 1996) is an Algerian professional footballer who plays as a defender for MC Alger and the Algeria national team.

== Career ==
In 2019, he joined the Belgian football club Beerschot.

== International career ==
Halaïmia made his debut with the Algeria national team in a friendly 1–0 win over Qatar on December 27, 2018.

== Honours ==
=== Clubs ===
MC Oran

- Algerian U21 Cup: 2017

K Beerschot VA

- Belgian Second Division: 2020

=== International ===
- Africa U-23 Cup of Nations: Runner-up 2015
