= Ayoub Ghezala =

Algerian footballer

Personal information
- Full name: Ayoub Ghezala
- Date of birth: 6 December 1995 (age 30)
- Place of birth: El Eulma, Algeria
- Height: 1.80 m (5 ft 11 in)
- Position: Centre-back

Team information
- Current team: MC Alger
- Number: 19

Senior career*
Years	Team	Apps	(Gls)
2015–2017	MC El Eulma	6	(0)
2017–2018	US Beni Douala	–	(–)
2018–2019	Amel Bou Saâda	42	(1)
2020–2021	USM Annaba	–	(–)
2021–	MC Alger	124	(5)

International career^{‡}
2022–	Algeria A'	15	(1)
Medal record
Men's football
Representing Algeria
African Nations Championship
Silver medal – second place	2022 Algeria
- * Club domestic league appearances and goals as of 5 June 2026 ‡ National team caps and goals as of 15 August 2025

Ayoub Ghezala (Arabic: أيوب غزالة; born 6 December 1995) is an Algerian professional footballer who plays as a centre-back for MC Alger and the Algeria A'.

== Club career ==
Ghezala began his senior career with MC El Eulma in the Algerian second division. He later played for US Beni Douala in the third tier, before joining Amel Bou Saâda and USM Annaba in the second division.

In summer 2021, he signed for MC Alger, making his Ligue 1 debut on 2 November 2021 against CR Belouizdad, coming on as a substitute in the 71st minute of a 2–1 win.

== International career ==
On 2 April 2022, Ghezala received his first call-up to the Algeria A' national football team by coach Madjid Bougherra for friendly matches against Togo, as preparation for the 2022 African Nations Championship.

== Career statistics ==
Scores and results list Algeria A' tally first.

=== International ===
No.	Date	Venue	Opponent	Score	Result	Competition
1.	29 July 2022	Nelson Mandela Stadium, Algiers, Algeria	Niger	1–0	2–0	2022 African Nations Championship qualification

== Honours ==
MC Alger

- Algerian Ligue Professionnelle 1: 2023–24, 2024–25
- Algerian Cup runner-up: 2023–24
- Algerian Super Cup: 2024

Algeria A'

- African Nations Championship runner-up: 2022
