= Amine Messoussa =

French footballer (born 2004)

Personal information
- Full name: Amine Ben Malik Messoussa
- Date of birth: 12 October 2004 (age 22)
- Place of birth: Lyon, France
- Height: 1.80 m (5 ft 11 in)
- Position: Forward

Team information
- Current team: Seraing
- Number: 27

Youth career
- 2010–2018: Lyon
- 2018–2020: Saint-Priest
- 2020–2021: Lille

Senior career*
Years	Team	Apps	(Gls)
2021–	Lille II	41	(18)
2023–2024	Lille	1	(0)
2024	→ Villefranche (loan)	11	(2)
2024–2026	MC Alger	34	(1)
2026–	Seraing	2	(2)

International career^{‡}
2021	Morocco U17	1	(1)
2021–2022	France U18	7	(4)
2022	France U19	1	(0)
Medal record
Men's football
Representing France
Mediterranean Games
Gold medal – first place	2022 Oran	Team
- * Club domestic league appearances and goals as of 19 September 2026 ‡ National team caps and goals as of 19:11, 3 October 2023 (UTC)

Amine Ben Malik Messoussa (Arabic: أمين مسوسة; born 12 October 2004) is a French professional footballer who plays as a forward for Challenger Pro League club Seraing in Belgium.

== Club career ==
Messoussa is a youth product of Lyon and Saint-Priest, before finishing his development with Lille on 10 August 2020. He started playing with Lille's reserves in 2021 in the Championnat National 3. On 5 July 2022, he signed his first professional contract with Lille. He made his professional debut with the senior Lille team as a late substitute in a 2–1 Ligue 1 win over Nantes on 27 May 2023.

On 30 January 2024, Messoussa was loaned to Villefranche.

On 4 September 2026, Messoussa signed a one-year contract with Belgian club Seraing, with an option for a second year.

== International career ==
Messousa was born in France to a Moroccan father and an Algerian mother, and is eligible for all 3 countries. He represented the Morocco U17s in a friendly 2–1 win over the Ghana U17s on 14 February 2021, and scored on debut. He played for the France U18s in their winning campaign at the 2022 Mediterranean Games, where he was the second highest scorer with 4 goals.

== Honours ==
France U18

- Mediterranean Games: 2022
