= 2024–25 CR Belouizdad season =

CR Belouizdad
2024–25 season
- Owner: MADAR Holding
- President: Mehdi Rabehi
- Head coach: Corentin Martins (from 16 July 2024) (until 14 October 2024); Abdelkader Amrani (from 16 October 2024) (until 24 January 2025); Sead Ramović (from 5 February 2025)
- Stadium: 20 August 1955 Stadium; Stade du 5 Juillet; Nelson Mandela Stadium
- Ligue 1: 3rd
- Algerian Cup: Runners–up
- Super Cup: Runners–up
- Champions League: Group stage
- Top goalscorer: League: Aymen Mahious (14 goals); All: Aymen Mahious (23 goals)
Home colours	Away colours

The 2024–25 season, is CR Belouizdad's 58th season and the club's 35th consecutive season in the top flight of Algerian football. In addition to the domestic league, CR Belouizdad are participating in this season's editions of the Algerian Cup, Super Cup and the Champions League. On June 27, 2024, The federal office approved the calendar for the 2024–25 Ligue 1 season with the aim of ending on May 31, 2025. The first round is scheduled for September 14, this delay is motivated both by an extended end of the 2023–24 season but also by the holding of early presidential elections which will take place on September 7, 2024. However, the Ligue de Football Professionnel decided to postpone the start of the Ligue 1 by a week, on September 21.

== Review ==
=== Background ===
On June 18, 2024, Taoufik Korichi became the new sports director (DTS) of CR Belouizdad after being relieved of his duties at USM Alger. Korichi He was installed in his new position replacing Zakaria Djebbour, Chabab revealed in a press release published on its social networks. On June 27, during the federal office meeting it was announced that the Super Cup, which had been absent since 2020. On July 9, 2024, CR Belouizdad President Mehdi Rabehi confirmed that the club's management wants to keep the Brazilian technician in his position. however, Marcos Paquetá did not respond favorably to the club management's proposal, regarding his new salary in anticipation of the current season.

Following urgent requests from certain clubs, the Algerian Football Federation has decided to increase the number of foreign players in the Ligue 1. After having formally passed through the technical college chaired by Rabah Saâdane, the FAF ratified the increase in the number of foreigners per club from 3 to 5. However, that there is a provision intended to serve as a safeguard for the license of a foreign player or coach to be validated, the club must pay the federation a deposit equivalent to 12 months salary. This is to protect against any financial dispute.

Following the serious incidents that marred the derby match against MC Alger on November 20, 2024, the Disciplinary Committee punished the two teams. After postponing its decision until the end of its meeting on November 25, and after studying other documents, in particular videos, the committee punished the team by ordering it to play four matches behind closed doors, two of which were suspended. It will also have to pay 200,000 DZD, not counting the financial compensation that the stadium manager will request.

On November 30, Mehdi Rabehi was reappointed as president of SSPA/CRB, while the board of directors was also renewed, among them are the journalist Maamar Djebbour, the former member of the federal office Rachid Oukali, the shareholder and former president of the CRB, Mohamed Bouhafs as well as Rachid Bahloul, director of the majority shareholder MADAR Holding and the representative of the amateur club (CSA), Boualem Boukherroucha.

== Squad list ==
Players and squad numbers last updated on 5 February 2025.
Note: Flags indicate national team as has been defined under FIFA eligibility rules. Players may hold more than one non-FIFA nationality.

No.	Nat.	Name	Position	Date of birth (age)	Signed from	Signed in	Contract ends	Apps	Goals
Goalkeepers
1	(Algeria)	Moustapha Zeghba	GK	21 November 1990 (aged 33)	(Saudi Arabia) Damac FC	2024	2026	0	0
26	(Algeria)	Redouane Maachou	GK	4 February 2001 (aged 23)	(Algeria) Youth system	2022	2025	5	0
30	(Algeria)	Farid Chaâl	GK	3 July 1994 (aged 30)	(Saudi Arabia) Al-Najma SC	2024	2026	0	0
Defenders
2	(Algeria)	Chouaib Keddad	CB	25 July 1994 (aged 30)	(Algeria) ASO Chlef	2018	2026	183	12
3	(Algeria)	Houcine Benayada	CB	8 August 1992 (aged 32)	(Morocco) Wydad AC	2023	2025	36	0
5	(Algeria)	Badreddine Souyad	CB	3 May 1995 (aged 29)	(Algeria) JS Kabylie	2024	2026	0	0
21	(Algeria)	Youcef Laouafi	LB	1 January 1996 (aged 28)	(Tunisia) ES Sahel	2022	2025	76	4
24	(Algeria)	Naoufel Khacef	LB	27 October 1997 (aged 26)	(Turkey) Gaziantep	2024	2026	15	0
29	(Algeria)	Bilal Boukerchaoui	RB	15 February 2003 (aged 22)	(Algeria) Youth system	2024	2028	0	0
Midfielders
6	(Algeria)	Oussama Daibeche	AM	28 January 1999 (aged 25)	(Algeria) ES Mostaganem	2024	2026	0	0
8	(Algeria)	Abderaouf Benguit	CM	5 April 1996 (aged 28)	(Morocco) Raja CA	2023	2025	44	6
15	(Algeria)	Housseyn Selmi	CM	11 February 1993 (aged 31)	(Algeria) CA Batna	2017	2024	214	7
23	(Cameroon)	Jacques Mbé	DM	24 February 1999 (aged 25)	(Tunisia) Étoile du Sahel	2024	2027	0	0
26	(Ivory Coast)	Arafat Doumbia	CM	16 November 2004 (aged 19)	(Ivory Coast) SO Armée	2024	2025	0	0
Forwards
9	(South Africa)	Khanyisa Mayo	ST	27 August 1998 (aged 26)	(South Africa) Cape Town City	2024	2027	0	0
10	(Algeria)	Ishak Boussouf	RW	August 22, 2001 (aged 23)	(Belgium) Lommel	2023	2025	63	6
11	(Algeria)	Abderrahmane Meziane	LW	March 7, 1994 (aged 30)	(Algeria) USM Alger	2023	2026	43	12
14	(Algeria)	Hedy Chaabi	RW	31 October 1995 (aged 28)	(Belgium) Francs Borains	2024	2025	0	0
17	(Algeria)	Merouane Zerrouki	ST	25 January 2001 (aged 23)	(Algeria) Paradou AC	2023	2026	14	1
18	(Algeria)	Aymen Mahious	ST	15 September 1997 (aged 26)	(Switzerland) Yverdon (loan)	2024	2025	0	0
19	(Algeria)	Mohamed Islam Belkhir	LW	March 16, 2001 (aged 23)	(Algeria) Youth system	2020	2024	135	22
22	(Algeria)	Rezki Hamroune	RW	10 March 1996 (aged 28)	(Egypt) Pharco FC	2024	2026	0	0

== Transfers ==
=== In ===
==== Summer ====
Date	Pos	Player	Moving from	Fee	Source
13 July 2024	AM	(Algeria) Oussama Daibeche	ES Mostaganem	Free transfer	
19 July 2024	MF	(Cameroon) Jacques Mbé	(Tunisia) Étoile du Sahel	320,000 $	
21 July 2024	GK	(Algeria) Farid Chaâl	(Saudi Arabia) Al-Najma SC	Free transfer	
21 July 2024	CB	(Algeria) Badreddine Souyad	JS Kabylie	Free transfer	
26 July 2024	LW	(Algeria) Hedy Chaabi	(Belgium) Francs Borains	Free transfer	
27 July 2024	CM	(Ivory Coast) Arafat Doumbia	(Ivory Coast) SO Armée	Free transfer	
31 July 2024	GK	(Algeria) Moustapha Zeghba	(Saudi Arabia) Damac FC	Free transfer	
2 August 2024	FW	(South Africa) Khanyisa Mayo	(South Africa) Cape Town City	1,500,000 €	
7 August 2024	RW	(Algeria) Rezki Hamroune	(Egypt) Pharco FC	Free transfer	
10 August 2024	FW	(Algeria) Aymen Mahious	(Switzerland) Yverdon	Loan for one season	
9 September 2024	ST	(Algeria) Islam Slimani	(Belgium) Mechelen	Free transfer	

=== Out ===
==== Summer ====
Date	Pos	Player	Moving to	Fee	Source
6 July 2024	DF	(Algeria) Sofiane Bouchar	(Kuwait) Al-Arabi	Loan return	
20 July 2024	FW	(Algeria) Lounes Adjout	JS Kabylie	Undisclosed	
20 July 2024	DF	(Algeria) Achraf Boudrama	CS Constantine	Free transfer	
20 July 2024	MF	(Mali) Mamadou Samaké	(Tanzania) Azam	Free transfer	
24 July 2024	FW	(Algeria) Aymene Rahmani	JS Saoura	Free transfer	
31 July 2024	GK	(Algeria) Alexis Guendouz	(Iran) Persepolis	185,000 €	
31 July 2024	DM	(Algeria) Houssem Eddine Mrezigue	(Russia) Dynamo Makhachkala	500,000 €	
5 August 2024	MF	(Algeria) Mohamed Islam Bakir	USM Khenchela	Free transfer	
13 August 2024	FW	(Cameroon) Leonel Wamba	(United Arab Emirates) Al Wahda	300,000 €	
24 August 2024	MF	(Algeria) Akram Bouras	MC Alger	Free transfer	
29 August 2024	ST	(Algeria) Oussama Darfalou	Unattached	Free transfer (Released)	
7 September 2024	RB	(Algeria) Mokhtar Belkhiter	Unattached (Note: Belkhiter joined ASO Chlef on 9 September 2024.)	Free transfer (Released)	

==== Winter ====
Date	Pos	Player	Moving to	Fee	Source
16 January 2025	ST	(Algeria) Islam Slimani	(Belgium) Westerlo	Loan for six months	
30 January 2025	CB	(Algeria) Mouad Hadded	(Libya) Al-Ahly Benghazi	Free transfer (Released)	
14 February 2025	RB	(Algeria) Mohamed Azzi	(Russia) Dynamo Makhachkala	Free transfer	

=== New contracts ===
No.	Pos	Player	Contract length	Contract end	Date	Source
37	RB	Mohamed Azzi	2 years	2026	13 July 2024	

== Competitions ==
=== Overview ===
Competition	Record								Started round	Final position / round	First match	Last match
Competition	G	W	D	L	GF	GA	GD	Win %	Started round	Final position / round	First match	Last match
Ligue 1	30	15	10	5	44	21	+23	50.00	—N/a	3rd	27 September 2024	21 June 2025
Algerian Cup	6	5	0	1	8	4	+4	83.33	Round of 64	Runners–up	6 January 2025	5 July 2025
Super Cup	1	0	1	0	2	2	+0	0.00	Final	Runners–up	8 February 2025	
CAF Champions League	10	6	0	4	15	11	+4	60.00	First round	Group stage	18 August 2024	18 January 2025
Total	47	26	11	10	69	38	+31	55.32				

Updated to match played 5 July 2025
Source: Competitions

=== Ligue 1 ===
==== League table ====
Pos	Team	Pld	W	D	L	GF	GA	GD	Pts	Qualification or relegation
1	MC Alger (C)	30	15	13	2	39	19	+20	58	Qualification for CAF Champions League
2	JS Kabylie	30	16	8	6	42	27	+15	56	Qualification for CAF Champions League
3	CR Belouizdad	30	15	10	5	44	21	+23	55	Qualification for Confederation Cup (Note: USMA Alger qualified for the 2025–26 CAF Confederation Cup by winning the 2024–25 Algerian Cup)
4	JS Saoura	30	12	7	11	34	36	−2	43	
5	Paradou AC	30	11	8	11	41	39	+2	41	

Source: the-sports.org
Rules for classification: 1) points; 2) head-to-head points; 3) head-to-head goal difference; 4) goal difference; 5) total goals; 6) fairplay ranking; 7) playoff.
(C) Champions

==== Results summary ====
Overall								Home						Away					
Pld	W	D	L	GF	GA	GD	Pts	W	D	L	GF	GA	GD	W	D	L	GF	GA	GD
30	15	10	5	44	21	+23	55	9	4	2	27	11	+16	6	6	3	17	10	+7

Last updated: 21 June 2025.
Source: Competitive matches

==== Results by round ====
Round	1	2	3	4	5	6	7	8	9	10	11	12	13	14	15	16	17	18	19	20	21	22	23	24	25	26	27	28	29	30
Ground	A	H	A	H	A	A	H	A	H	A	H	A	H	A	H	H	A	H	A	H	H	A	H	A	H	A	H	A	H	A
ResHult	D	D	D	L	D	L	W	W	D	W	W	W	L	W	W	W	L	W	D	D	W	W	W	L	D	D	W	W	W	D
Position	7	11	12	13	11	16	12	8	9	7	4	3	5	3	2	2	2	2	2	2	2	2	2	2	3	3	3	3	2	3

Updated to match(es) played on 21 June 2025. Source: Competitive matches
A = Away; H = Home; W = Win; D = Draw; L = Loss

==== Matches ====
The league fixtures were announced on 11 July 2024.

All times are local, WAT (UTC+1).

Win Draw Loss Postponed

27 September 2024 Round 2	CR Belouizdad	0–0	ES Sétif	Algiers
16:00		Report		Stadium: 20 August 1955 Stadium; Referee: Houssam Benyahia

2 October 2024 Round 1	USM Khenchela	0–0	CR Belouizdad	Khenchela
16:00		Report		Stadium: Amar Hamam Stadium; Referee: Yahia Dehar

6 October 2024 Round 3	US Biskra	0–0	CR Belouizdad	Biskra
17:45		Report		Stadium: 18 February Stadium; Referee: Mustapha Ghorbal; VAR: Rafik Aouina

12 October 2024 Round 4	CR Belouizdad	2–3	MC El Bayadh	Algiers
19:00	Slimani 32', 43'	Report	Barkat 5'; El Moudene 9'; Belaribi 48'	Stadium: Stade du 5 Juillet; Referee: Lahlou Benbraham

18 October 2024 Round 5	USM Alger	0–0	CR Belouizdad	Algiers
19:00		Report		Stadium: Stade du 5 Juillet; Referee: Mehdi Oukil; VAR: Alaa Bouab

25 October 2024 Round 6	NC Magra	1–0	CR Belouizdad	Magra
15:00	Djabout 74'	Report		Stadium: Boucheligue Brothers Stadium; Referee: Akram Mechairia

9 November 2024 Round 8	ES Mostaganem	0–2	CR Belouizdad	Mostaganem
18:00		Report	Benguit 76', 90+5'	Stadium: Mohamed Bensaïd Stadium; Referee: Alaa Bouab

20 November 2024 Round 10	MC Alger	1–3	CR Belouizdad	Algiers
20:00	Delort 15'	Report	Slimani 31'; Benguit 65'; Khacef 90+6'	Stadium: Stade du 5 Juillet; Referee: Rafik Aouina; VAR: Abderahmane Sahraoui

1 December 2024 Round 11	CR Belouizdad	2–0	ASO Chlef	Algiers
17:45	Mahious 45+6'; Mayo 53'	Report		Stadium: Stade du 5 Juillet; Attendance: 0 (close doors); Referee: Mehdi Oukil; VAR: Nabil Boukhalfa

17 December 2024 Round 7	CR Belouizdad	3–0	JS Saoura	Algiers
16:30	Meziane 49'; Mahious 52'; Mayo 57'	Report		Stadium: Stade du 5 Juillet; Attendance: 0 (close doors); Referee: Fateh Harkat; VAR: Abderahmane Sahraoui

27 December 2024 Round 15	CR Belouizdad	1–0	Olympique Akbou	Algiers
16:00	Meziane 78'	Report		Stadium: Stade du 5 Juillet; Attendance: 0 (close doors); Referee: Tahar Boudjemaa; VAR: Alaa Bouab

21 January 2025 Round 9	CR Belouizdad	1–1	JS Kabylie	Algiers
17:45	Mahious 70'	Report	Malki 86'	Stadium: Stade du 5 Juillet; Referee: Alaa Bouab; VAR: Mustapha Ghorbal

25 January 2025 Round 12	Paradou AC	1–2	CR Belouizdad	Algiers
17:00	Kaassis 87'	Report	Khacef 45+9'; Mayo 86'	Stadium: Stade du 5 Juillet; Referee: Nabil Boukhalfa; VAR: Houssam Benyahia

30 January 2025 Round 13	CR Belouizdad	0–2	CS Constantine	Algiers
19:00		Report	Belhocini 79', 86'	Stadium: Stade du 5 Juillet; Referee: Yahia Dehar; VAR: Rafik Aouina

3 February 2025 Round 14	MC Oran	1–2	CR Belouizdad	Bir El Djir
18:00	Aribi 80'	Report	Mahious 31', 46'	Stadium: Miloud Hadefi Stadium; Attendance: 0 (close doors); Referee: Youcef Gamouh; VAR: Alaa Bouab

12 February 2025 Round 16	CR Belouizdad	3–0	USM Khenchela	Baraki
19:00	Mayo 28'; Hamroune 51'; Boukerchaoui 87'	Report		Stadium: Nelson Mandela Stadium; Referee: Rafik Aouina; VAR: Nabil Boukhalfa

20 February 2025 Round 17	ES Sétif	1–0	CR Belouizdad	Sétif
16:45	Eduwo 21'	Report		Stadium: 8 May 1945 Stadium; Attendance: 0 (close doors); Referee: Mustapha Ghorbal; VAR: Alaa Bouab

26 February 2025 Round 18	CR Belouizdad	2–0	US Biskra	Baraki
20:00	Mahious 63'; Belkhir 90+1'	Report		Stadium: Nelson Mandela Stadium; Referee: Akram Mechairia; VAR: Youcef Taieb Bouderbal

6 March 2025 Round 19	MC El Bayadh	0–0	CR Belouizdad	El Bayadh
15:30		Report		Stadium: Zakaria Medjdoub Stadium; Attendance: 0 (close doors); Referee: Smain Hamlet

16 March 2025 Round 20	CR Belouizdad	1–1	USM Alger	Baraki
22:00	Mahious 71'	Report	Benzaza 66'	Stadium: Nelson Mandela Stadium; Referee: Nabil Boukhalfa; VAR: Tahar Boudjemaa

5 April 2025 Round 21	CR Belouizdad	4–0	NC Magra	Baraki
17:00	Mahious 9'; Belkhir 57'; Meziane 75'; Hamroune 88'	Report		Stadium: Nelson Mandela Stadium; Attendance: 0 (close doors); Referee: Yahia Dehar; VAR: Nabil Boukhalfa

10 April 2025 Round 22	JS Saoura	1–3	CR Belouizdad	Béchar
19:00	Saâdi 47'	Report	Laouafi 8' (pen.); Boukerchaoui 13'; Boussouar 83'	Stadium: 20 August 1955 Stadium; Referee: Abdelali Ibrir

19 April 2025 Round 23	CR Belouizdad	3–2	ES Mostaganem	Baraki
17:00	Mahious 87', 89'; Hamroune 90+6'	Report	Hitala 37', 79'	Stadium: Nelson Mandela Stadium; Attendance: 0 (close doors); Referee: Ayoub Belhachemi

26 April 2025 Round 24	JS Kabylie	3–2	CR Belouizdad	Tizi Ouzou
19:00	Ignatyev 21'; Berkane 44', 84'	Report	Meziane 25'; Belkhir 69'	Stadium: Hocine Aït Ahmed Stadium; Referee: Lahlou Benbraham; VAR: Fateh Harkat

12 May 2025 Round 25	CR Belouizdad	1–1	MC Alger	Baraki
17:00	Boussouar 75'	Report	Bangoura 54'	Stadium: Nelson Mandela Stadium; Attendance: 0 (close doors); Referee: Akram Mechairia; VAR: Yahia Dehar

19 May 2025 Round 26	ASO Chlef	1–1	CR Belouizdad	Chlef
17:00	Bounoua 51'	Report	Meziane 3'	Stadium: Mohamed Boumezrag Stadium; Referee: Rafik Aouina; VAR: Redouane Allou

27 May 2025 Round 27	CR Belouizdad	2–1	Paradou AC	Baraki
19:00	Mahious 56', 77'	Report	Yattou 5'	Stadium: Nelson Mandela Stadium; Referee: Lotfi Bekouassa; VAR: Youcef Taieb Bouderbal

12 June 2025 Round 28	CS Constantine	0–2	CR Belouizdad	Constantine
21:00		Report	Mahious 21' (pen.); Belkhir 86'	Stadium: Chahid Hamlaoui Stadium; Referee: Nabil Boukhalfa; VAR: Mehdi Oukil

17 June 2025 Round 29	CR Belouizdad	2–0	MC Oran	Algiers
17:30	Mahious 45' (pen.); Hamroune 58'	Report		Stadium: Stade du 5 Juillet; Referee: Fateh Harkat; VAR: Ghada Mehat

21 June 2025 Round 30	Olympique Akbou	0–0	CR Belouizdad	Béjaïa
17:45		Report		Stadium: Maghrebi Unity Stadium; Referee: Haitham Ghouti; VAR: Akram Mechairia

=== Algerian Cup ===
7 January 2025 Round of 64	CR Belouizdad	1–0	CR Zaouia	Algiers
19:00	Chaabi 43'	Report		Stadium: Stade du 5 Juillet; Referee: Mohamed Lamine Chaoubi

20 February 2025 Round of 32	CR Belouizdad	1–0	MC Alger	Algiers
20:00	Mahious 47'	Report		Stadium: Stade du 5 Juillet; Referee: Houssam Benyahia

12 March 2025 Round of 16	CR Belouizdad	4–2	US Chaouia	Algiers
22:00	Mahious 34', 51' (pen.), 65'; Boussouar 86'	Report	Mellouk 5'; Merri 89'	Stadium: Stade du 5 Juillet; Referee: Zouhir Mansri

28 March 2025 Quarter-finals	CR Belouizdad	1–0	MO Béjaïa	Tizi Ouzou
22:00	Mayo 55'	Report		Stadium: Hocine Aït Ahmed Stadium; Referee: Fateh Harkat; VAR: Youcef Gamouh

15 April 2025 Semi-finals	CR Belouizdad	1–0	MC El Bayadh	Bir El Djir
18:00	Meziane 46'	Report		Stadium: Miloud Hadefi Stadium; Referee: Rafik Aouina; VAR: Nabil Boukhalfa

5 July 2025 Final	USM Alger	2–0	CR Belouizdad	Baraki
17:00	Benayad 9'; Khaldi 13'	Report		Stadium: Nelson Mandela Stadium; Referee: Yahia Dehar; VAR: Fateh Harkat

=== Super Cup ===
8 February 2025	MC Alger	2–2 (4–3 p)	CR Belouizdad	Algiers
17:00	Bayazid 14' (pen.); Abdellaoui 27'	Report	Mahious 72' (pen.), 88'	Stadium: Stade du 5 Juillet; Referee: Lahlou Benbraham
	Penalties
	Abdellaoui (penalty scored); Halaïmia (penalty missed); Ghezala (penalty scored); Bouras (penalty scored); Messoussa (penalty scored)		(penalty scored) Meziane; (penalty scored) Mayo; (penalty scored) Benayada; (penalty missed) Khacef; (penalty missed) Mahious

=== Champions League ===
==== Qualifying rounds ====
In the qualifying rounds, each tie will be played on a home-and-away two-legged basis. If the aggregate score will be tied after the second leg, the away goals rule was applied, and if still tied, extra time will not be played, and the penalty shoot-out will be used to determine the winner (Regulations III. 13 & 14). The draw for the qualifying rounds was held on 11 July 2024, 12:00 GMT (15:00 local time, UTC+3), at the CAF headquarters in Cairo, Egypt.

===== First round =====
18 August 2024 First leg	AC Léopards (Republic of the Congo)	0–2	(Algeria) CR Belouizdad	Brazzaville
14:30 UTC+1		Report	Boussouf 32'; Khacef 83'	Stadium: Stade Alphonse Massemba-Débat; Referee: Ousmane Diakate (Mali)
Note: Lineup for CR Belouizdad - Maachou, Keddad, Khacef, Hadded, Azzi (substituted off) 86' (Benayada, (substituted on) 86'), Benguit, Selmi, Meziane (substituted off) 86' (Hammadi, (substituted on) 86'), Darfalou (substituted off) 82' (Zerrouki, (substituted on) 82'), Boussouf (substituted off) 82' (Chaabi, (substituted on) 82'), Daibeche (substituted off) 74' (Mbé, (substituted on) 74').

24 August 2024 Second leg	CR Belouizdad (Algeria)	1–0 (3–0 agg.)	(Republic of the Congo) AC Léopards	Blida
20:00 UTC+1	Benguit 24'	Report		Stadium: Mustapha Tchaker Stadium; Attendance: 0 (close doors); Referee: Patrice Milazar (Mauritius)
Note: Lineup for CR Belouizdad - Maachou, Keddad, Khacef, Hadded, Benayada (substituted off) 79' (Azzi, (substituted on) 79'), Daibeche (substituted off) 57' (Mbé, (substituted on) 57'), Benguit, Selmi, Boussouf (substituted off) 57' (Chaabi, (substituted on) 57'), Meziane (substituted off) 69' (Zerrouki, (substituted on) 69'), Darfalou (substituted off) 69' (Belkhir, (substituted on) 69').

===== Second round =====
14 September 2024 First leg	AS Douanes (Burkina Faso)	1–0	(Algeria) CR Belouizdad	Bamako (Mali)
16:00 UTC+0	Sanou (yellow card) 30'; Traoré (yellow card) 58'; Pitroipa 84'	Report	M.Azzi (yellow card) 26'; Mahious (yellow card) 28'; Doumbia (yellow card) 56'	Stadium: Stade Mamadou Konaté; Referee: Wililam Oloya (Uganda)
Note: Lineup for CR Belouizdad - Zeghba, Keddad, Hadded, Azzi (substituted off) 80' (Benayada, (substituted on) 80'), Laouafi (substituted off) 80' (Khacef, (substituted on) 80'), Daibeche, Selmi (substituted off) 7' (Doumbia, (substituted on) 7' (substituted off) 72', Mayo, (substituted on) 72'), Benguit, Boussouf, Meziane, Mahious (substituted off) 80' (Hamroune, (substituted on) 80').

20 September 2024 Second leg	CR Belouizdad (Algeria)	1–0 (1–1 agg.) (4–3 p)	(Burkina Faso) AS Douanes	Oran
18:00 UTC+1	Doumbia (yellow card) 26'; Meziane 35'; Keddad (yellow card) 47' (yellow-red card) 80'	Report	L.Traoré (yellow card) 81'	Stadium: Miloud Hadefi Stadium; Referee: Mitiku Tewodros (Ethiopia)
	Penalties
	Benguit (penalty missed); Chaabi (penalty scored); Zerrouki (penalty scored); Khacef (penalty scored); Mahious (penalty scored)		(penalty scored) ? (penalty scored) ? (penalty scored) ? (penalty missed) ? (penalty missed) ?
Note: Lineup for CR Belouizdad - Zeghba, Keddad, Hadded, Daibeche, Benguit, Mayo, Boussouf (substituted off) 61' (Chaabi, (substituted on) 61'), Meziane (substituted off) 84' (Zerrouki, (substituted on) 84'), Azzi, Khacef, Doumbia (substituted off) 72' (Mbé, (substituted on) 72').

==== Group stage ====
The draw for the group stage was held on 7 October 2024, 11:00 GMT (14:00 local time, UTC+3), in Cairo, Egypt. The 16 winners of the second round of qualifying rounds were drawn into four groups of four. The teams were seeded by their performances in the CAF competitions for the previous five seasons (CAF 5-year ranking points shown next to every team). Each group contains one team from each of Pot 1, Pot 2, Pot 3, and Pot 4, and each team were allocated to the positions in their group according to their pot.

Pos	Team	Pld	W	D	L	GF	GA	GD	Pts	Qualification	OPFC	AHL	CRB	SAB
1	(South Africa) Orlando Pirates	6	4	2	0	10	4	+6	14	Advance to knockout stage	—	0–0	2–1	3–0
2	(Egypt) Al Ahly	6	3	1	2	14	7	+7	10	Advance to knockout stage	1–2	—	6–1	4–2
3	(Algeria) CR Belouizdad	6	3	0	3	11	10	+1	9		1–2	1–0	—	6–0
4	(Ivory Coast) Stade d'Abidjan	6	0	1	5	4	18	−14	1		1–1	1–3	0–1	—

Source: CAF

26 November 2024 1	CR Belouizdad (Algeria)	1–2	(South Africa) Orlando Pirates	Algiers
20:00 UTC+1	Mayo 66'	Report	Nkota 5', 27'	Stadium: Stade du 5 Juillet; Referee: Jean Jacques Ndala Ngambo (DR Congo)

7 December 2024 2	Stade d'Abidjan (Ivory Coast)	0–1	(Algeria) CR Belouizdad	Abidjan (Note: Stade d'Abidjan will play their home matches at Felix Houphouet Boigny Stadium, instead of their regular stadium, Robert Champroux Stadium, both located in Abidjan, which did not meet CAF requirements.)
16:00 UTC+0		Report	Mahious 71'	Stadium: Felix Houphouet Boigny Stadium; Referee: Ahmad Imtehaz Heeralall (Mauritius)

22 December 2024 (Note: The Al Ahly v CR Belouizdad match, originally scheduled to be played on 13 or 14 December, was rescheduled to be played on 22 December 2024 due to Al Ahly participation in the 2024 FIFA Intercontinental Cup.) 3	Al Ahly (Egypt)	6–1	(Algeria) CR Belouizdad	Cairo
18:00 UTC+2	Abou Ali 45+3', 51', 84'; El Shahat 56'; Tau 86'; Ashour 90+3'	Report	Mahious 21'	Stadium: Cairo International Stadium; Referee: Sadok Selmi (Tunisia)

3 January 2025 4	CR Belouizdad (Algeria)	1–0	(Egypt) Al Ahly	Algiers
20:00 UTC+1	Khacef 90+1'	Report		Stadium: Stade du 5 Juillet; Referee: Omar Abdulkadir Artan (Somalia)

12 January 2025 5	Orlando Pirates (South Africa)	2–1	(Algeria) CR Belouizdad	Johannesburg
15:00 UTC+2	Mofokeng 20'; Mbatha 61'	Report	Benguit 90+2'	Stadium: Orlando Stadium; Referee: Daniel Nii Laryea (Ghana)

18 January 2025 6	CR Belouizdad (Algeria)	6–0	(Ivory Coast) Stade d'Abidjan	Algiers
17:00 UTC+1	Meziane 17'; Belkhir 27', 36'; Mahious 49'; Hamroune 87'; Zerrouki 90'	Report		Stadium: Stade du 5 Juillet; Referee: Alhadi Allaou Mahamat (Chad)

== Squad information ==
=== Appearances and goals ===
As of 21 June 2025

No.	Pos	Player	Nat	Ligue 1			Algerian Cup			Super Cup			Champions League			Total		
No.	Pos	Player	Nat	App	St	G	App	St	G	App	St	G	App	St	G	App	St	G
Goalkeepers
1	GK	Moustapha Zeghba	(Algeria)	26	26	0	3	3	0	1	1	0	8	8	0	38	38	0
26	GK	Redouane Maachou	(Algeria)	2	2	0	1	1	0	0	0	0	2	2	0	5	5	0
30	GK	Farid Chaâl	(Algeria)	2	2	0	2	2	0	0	0	0	0	0	0	4	4	0
Defenders
2	DF	Chouaib Keddad	(Algeria)	26	26	0	1	1	0	1	1	0	8	8	0	36	36	0
3	DF	Houcine Benayada	(Algeria)	25	23	0	2	2	0	1	1	0	8	6	0	36	32	0
5	DF	Badreddine Souyad	(Algeria)	5	5	0	2	2	0	0	0	0	4	2	0	11	9	0
21	DF	Youcef Laouafi	(Algeria)	21	19	1	2	2	0	0	0	0	4	3	0	27	24	1
24	DF	Naoufel Khacef	(Algeria)	20	19	2	2	2	0	1	1	0	9	7	2	32	29	4
28	DF	Abderrahmane Bekkour	(Algeria)	7	4	0	1	0	0	1	1	0	2	0	0	11	5	0
29	DF	Bilal Boukerchaoui	(Algeria)	14	13	2	5	5	0	1	1	0	0	0	0	20	19	2
Midfielders
6	MF	Oussama Daibeche	(Algeria)	13	8	0	2	1	0	0	0	0	8	5	0	23	14	0
8	MF	Abderaouf Benguit	(Algeria)	25	25	3	3	3	0	1	1	0	10	10	1	39	39	4
15	MF	Housseyn Selmi	(Algeria)	15	15	0	3	2	0	1	1	0	8	8	0	27	26	0
20	MF	Ishak Boussouf	(Algeria)	13	4	0	2	0	0	0	0	0	5	5	1	20	9	1
23	MF	Jacques Mbé	(Cameroon)	20	12	0	1	1	0	1	0	0	6	2	0	28	15	0
26	MF	Arafat Doumbia	(Ivory Coast)	14	5	0	1	1	0	0	0	0	4	2	0	19	8	0
Forwards
9	FW	Khanyisa Mayo	(South Africa)	27	15	4	3	2	0	1	0	0	8	5	1	27	15	5
10	FW	Ishak Boussouf	(Algeria)	13	6	0	2	0	0	0	0	0	5	4	1	20	10	1
11	FW	Abderrahmane Meziane	(Algeria)	27	25	5	3	2	0	1	1	0	10	10	2	28	25	4
14	FW	Hedy Chaabi	(Algeria)	20	7	0	2	2	1	0	0	0	6	1	0	19	6	1
17	FW	Merouane Zerrouki	(Algeria)	5	2	0	0	0	0	0	0	0	5	0	1	10	2	1
18	FW	Aymen Mahious	(Algeria)	22	19	14	3	2	4	1	1	2	7	5	3	33	27	23
19	FW	Mohamed Islam Belkhir	(Algeria)	26	17	4	3	1	0	1	1	0	7	3	1	25	15	5
22	FW	Rezki Hamroune	(Algeria)	20	8	4	1	0	0	0	0	0	5	0	1	26	8	5
34	FW	Lotfi Boussouar	(Algeria)	14	1	2	1	0	1	0	0	0	0	0	0	15	1	3
Players transferred out during the season
~~4~~	DF	Mouad Hadded	(Algeria)	11	10	0	1	1	0	0	0	0	10	10	0	22	21	0
~~37~~	DF	Mohamed Azzi	(Algeria)	13	8	0	1	1	0	0	0	0	9	4	0	23	13	0
~~25~~	DF	Abdel Ali Hamadi	(Algeria)	0	0	0	0	0	0	0	0	0	1	0	0	1	0	0
~~13~~	FW	Oussama Darfalou	(Algeria)	0	0	0	0	0	0	0	0	0	1	1	0	1	1	0
~~13~~	FW	Islam Slimani	(Algeria)	8	7	3	1	1	0	0	0	0	3	2	0	12	10	3
Total				30		44	3		6	1		2	10		15	44		69

Last updated: 21 June 2025
Source: mondefootball.fr

=== Goalscorers ===
As of 5 July 2025

Includes all competitive matches.

No.	Nat.	Player	Pos.	L1	AC	SC	CL1	TOTAL
18	(Algeria)	Aymen Mahious	FW	14	4	2	3	23
11	(Algeria)	Abderrahmane Meziane	FW	5	1	0	2	8
19	(Algeria)	Mohamed Islam Belkhir	FW	4	0	0	2	6
9	(South Africa)	Khanyisa Mayo	FW	4	1	0	1	6
8	(Algeria)	Abderaouf Benguit	MF	3	0	0	2	5
22	(Algeria)	Rezki Hamroune	FW	4	0	0	1	5
24	(Algeria)	Naoufel Khacef	DF	2	0	0	2	4
13	(Algeria)	Islam Slimani	ST	3	0	0	0	3
34	(Algeria)	Lofti Boussouar	FW	2	1	0	0	3
29	(Algeria)	Bilal Boukerchaoui	MF	2	0	0	0	2
10	(Algeria)	Ishak Boussouf	MF	0	0	0	1	1
17	(Algeria)	Merouane Zerrouki	FW	0	0	0	1	1
14	(Algeria)	Hedy Chaabi	FW	0	1	0	0	1
21	(Algeria)	Youcef Laouafi	DF	1	0	0	0	1
Own Goals				0	0	0	0	0
Totals				44	8	2	15	69

=== Clean sheets ===
As of 5 July 2025

					Clean sheets				
No.	Nat	Name	GP	GA	L1	AC	SC	CL1	Total
1	(Algeria)	Moustapha Zeghba	38	35	12	2	0	4	18
26	(Algeria)	Redouane Maachou	5	1	1	1	0	2	4
30	(Algeria)	Farid Chaâl	4	2	2	1	0	0	3
		TOTALS		38	15	4	0	6	25
