= 2024 Algerian Super Cup =

- Stade du 5 Juillet hosted the match
| MC Alger | CR Belouizdad |
| Ligue 1 | Algerian Cup |
| 2 | 2 |
- MC Alger won 4–3 on penalties
- Date: 8 February 2025
- Venue: Stade du 5 Juillet, Algiers
- Referee: Lahlou Benbraham
- Weather: Mostly cloudy 14 °C (57 °F); 83% humidity

The 2024 Algerian Super Cup was the 14th edition of the Algerian Super Cup, a football match contested by the winners of the 2023–24 Algerian Ligue Professionnelle 1 and 2023–24 Algerian Cup competitions. The match was played on February 8, 2025, between 2023–24 Ligue 1 winners MC Alger and 2023–24 Algerian Cup winners CR Belouizdad.

== Match ==
=== Pre-match ===
On June 27, 2024, during the federal office meeting it was announced that the Super Cup, which had been absent since 2020. According to the established schedule, the final which will oppose MC Alger to CR Belouizdad will take place on Friday, January 17, 2025. However, the Algerian Football Federation (FAF) announced that the final was postponed to February 8, 2025.

On February 5, 2025, the Federal Arbitration Commission (CFA) of the FAF appointed Lahlou Benbraham as a referee for the match, who was being assisted by Amirouche Boufassa and Kheireddine Djenadi. The fourth referee was Tayeb Youcef Bouderbal. As for the video assistance referee (VAR), it was entrusted to Abderrahmane Sahraoui and Haitham Bouima.

== Match details ==
8 February 2025
17:00

| MC Alger | 2–2 | CR Belouizdad |
|---|---|---|
| Bayazid 14' (pen.); Abdellaoui 27' | Report | Mahious 72' (pen.), 88' |
Penalties
| Abdellaoui (penalty scored); Halaïmia (penalty missed); Ghezala (penalty scored); Bouras (penalty scored); Messoussa (penalty scored) | 4–3 | (penalty scored) Meziane; (penalty scored) Mayo; (penalty scored) Benayada; (penalty missed) Khacef; (penalty missed) Mahious |

Stade du 5 Juillet, Algiers
Referee: Lahlou Benbraham

| MC Alger | CR Belouizdad |

| GK | 1 | (Algeria) Abdelatif Ramdane | (yellow card) 73' |
| DF | 5 | (Algeria) Ayoub Abdellaoui (c) |
| DF | 20 | (Algeria) Réda Halaïmia |
| DF | 19 | (Algeria) Ayoub Ghezala | (yellow card) 73' |
| DF | 3 | (Algeria) Marwane Khelif |
| MF | 6 | (Algeria) Mohamed Benkhemassa |
| MF | 26 | (Algeria) Akram Bouras |
| MF | 12 | (Ivory Coast) Mohamed Zougrana | (yellow card) 4' | (substituted off) 77' |
| FW | 29 | (Algeria) Amine Messoussa |
| FW | 7 | (Algeria) Sofiane Bayazid | | (substituted off) 77' |
| FW | 22 | (Ivory Coast) Kipre Junior | | (substituted off) 90' |
Substitutes :
| GK | 16 | (Algeria) Toufik Moussaoui |
| MF | 8 | (Algeria) Zakaria Draoui |
| FW | 24 | (Algeria) Zakaria Naidji | | (substituted on) 77' |
| FW | 0 | (Algeria) Tayeb Meziani | | (substituted on) 90' |
| DF | 14 | (Algeria) Hamza Mouali |
| DF | 17 | (Algeria) Kamel Hamidi |
| FW | 18 | (Algeria) Khayreddine Merzougui |
| MF | 21 | (Algeria) Larbi Tabti | | (substituted on) 77' |
| MF | 28 | (Algeria) Oussama Benhaoua |
Manager :
(Tunisia) Khaled Ben Yahia

| GK | 1 | (Algeria) Moustapha Zeghba | (yellow card) 12' |
| DF | 2 | (Algeria) Chouaib Keddad | (yellow card) 73' |
| DF | 28 | (Algeria) Abderrahmane Bekkour |
| DF | 3 | (Algeria) Houcine Benayada |
| DF | 24 | (Algeria) Naoufel Khacef | (yellow card) 66' |
| MF | 15 | (Algeria) Housseyn Selmi | (yellow card) 82' |
| MF | 29 | (Algeria) Bilal Boukerchaoui | (yellow card) 55' | (substituted off) 70' |
| MF | 6 | (Algeria) Raouf Benguit (c) |
| FW | 11 | (Algeria) Abderrahmane Meziane |
| FW | 19 | (Algeria) Mohamed Islam Belkhir | | (substituted off) 70' |
| FW | 18 | (Algeria) Aymen Mahious | (yellow card) 89' |
Substitutes :
| GK | 16 | (Algeria) Farid Chaâl |
| MF | 23 | (Cameroon) Jacques Mbé | | (substituted on) 70' |
| FW | 9 | (South Africa) Khanyisa Mayo | | (substituted on) 70' |
| MF | 10 | (Algeria) Ishak Boussouf |
| DF | 5 | (Algeria) Badreddine Souyad |
| MF | 6 | (Algeria) Oussama Daibeche |
| DF | 37 | (Algeria) Mohamed Azzi |
| DF | 20 | (Algeria) Youcef Laouafi |
| FW | 22 | (Algeria) Rezki Hamroune |
Manager :
(Germany) Sead Ramović

Assistant referees:
Amirouche Boufassa
Kheireddine Djenadi
Fourth official:
Tayeb Youcef Bouderbal
Video assistant referee:
Abderrahmane Sahraoui
Assistant video assistant referees:
Haitham Bouima

Match rules
- 90 minutes.
- Penalty shoot-out if scores level.
- Nine named substitutes, of which up to five may be used.

== See also ==
- 2023–24 Algerian Ligue Professionnelle 1
- 2023–24 Algerian Cup
