= 2025–26 CR Belouizdad season =

CR Belouizdad
2025–26 season
- Owner: MADAR Holding
- President: Mehdi Rabehi (until 7 July 2025); Rachid Oukali (from 8 July 2025) (until 14 July 2025); Badreddine Bahloul (from 15 July 2025) (until 3 May 2025); Mohamed Arar (from 3 May 2025)
- Head coach: Sead Ramović (until 28 March 2026); Salim Sebaâ (from 28 March 2026) (until 20 April 2026); Ishak Ali Moussa (from 20 April 2026)
- Stadium: Nelson Mandela Stadium (Note: CR Belouizdad played some home games at 20 August 1955 Stadium due to renovation in Nelson Mandela Stadium.)
- Ligue 1: 3rd
- Algerian Cup: Runners–up
- Confederation Cup: Semi-finals
- Top goalscorer: League: Mohamed Ali Ben Hammouda (9 goals); All: Mohamed Ali Ben Hammouda (13 goals)
- Biggest win: CR Belouizdad 7–0 ES Mostaganem
- Biggest defeat: AS Otohô 4–1 CR Belouizdad
Home colours	Away colours

The 2025–26 season, was CR Belouizdad's 59th season and the club's 36th consecutive season in the top flight of Algerian football. In addition to the domestic league, CR Belouizdad participated in this season's editions of the Algerian Cup and the Confederation Cup. The Algerian Professional Football League (LFP) officially released the calendar for the 2025–26 Ligue 1 Mobilis season on July 10, 2025.

== Review ==
=== Background ===
On July 7, 2025, Mahdi Rabhi announced his resignation as chairman of the Board of Directors of SSPA/CR Belouizdad, two days after the team's defeat in the Algerian Cup final against USM Alger. Rabhi stated that this decision, based on personal reasons, had been on his mind since the match against MC El Bayadh during the first half of last season. Rabhi informed the CEO of MADAR Holding and expressed his gratitude to the club's management and board members. Rabhi reaffirmed his loyalty to CRB and pledged to continue supporting the club outside of any official role.

Rachid Oukali lasted only six days as the club’s president before stepping down for “personal reasons,” despite Charaf-Eddine Amara’s attempts to convince him to stay. The position has now been handed over to Badreddine Bahloul, a senior executive at Madar, who is already known as a devoted supporter of the Chabab. His profile as a rigorous manager is seen as an asset in a context where the team needs stability and efficiency, especially with important sporting and administrative deadlines approaching.

On July 22, 2025, CR Belouizdad unveiled its ambitious training center project, named Lalmassia Training Campus. The name honors club legend Hacène Lalmas while referencing both the Arabic word Al Almas (Diamond) and FC Barcelona’s La Masia, the project was reimagined after MADAR Holding took control of the club. A year ago, MADAR acquired a larger 19-hectare site in Djasr Kasentina, southern Algiers, signaling a major upgrade in the club’s infrastructure ambitions. Lalmasia is now considered the most ambitious training complex ever envisioned by an Algerian club.

== Squad list ==
Players and squad numbers last updated on 31 January 2026.
Note: Flags indicate national team as has been defined under FIFA eligibility rules. Players may hold more than one non-FIFA nationality.

No.	Nat.	Name	Position	Date of birth (age)	Signed from
Goalkeepers
1	(Algeria)	Tarek Bousseder	GK	28 November 2000 (aged 24)	(Algeria) ES Sétif
16	(Algeria)	Anes Mokhtar	GK	28 February 2005 (aged 20)	(Algeria) Youth system
30	(Algeria)	Farid Chaâl	GK	3 July 1994 (aged 31)	(Saudi Arabia) Al-Najma SC
Defenders
2	(Algeria)	Chouaib Keddad	CB	25 July 1994 (aged 31)	(Algeria) ASO Chlef
3	(Algeria)	Houcine Benayada	RB	8 August 1992 (aged 33)	(Morocco) Wydad AC
4	(Algeria)	Abderrahmane Bekkour	CB	22 July 2003 (aged 22)	(Algeria) Youth system
14	(Algeria)	Oussama Benkihoul	RB	7 January 2006 (aged 19)	(Algeria) Youth system
21	(Algeria)	Youcef Laouafi	CB	1 January 1996 (aged 29)	(Tunisia) ES Sahel
24	(Algeria)	Naoufel Khacef	LB	27 October 1997 (aged 27)	(Turkey) Gaziantep
25	(Algeria)	Younes Ouassa	CB	4 July 1999 (aged 26)	(Algeria) Olympique Akbou
Midfielders
5	(Algeria)	Abdelmalek Kelaleche	AM	26 July 2005 (aged 20)	(Algeria) MC Alger
6	(Algeria)	Necer Benzid	CM	20 February 2001 (aged 24)	(Algeria) MB Rouissat
8	(Algeria)	Abderaouf Benguit	CM	5 April 1996 (aged 29)	(Morocco) Raja CA
10	(Ivory Coast)	Jean Charles Ahoua	AM	10 February 2002 (aged 23)	(Tanzania) Simba SC
18	(Algeria)	Salim Boukhanchouche	DM	6 October 1991 (aged 33)	(Algeria) USM Alger
27	(Algeria)	Djaber Kaâssis	CM	3 May 1999 (aged 26)	(Algeria) Paradou AC
29	(Algeria)	Bilal Boukerchaoui	CM	15 February 2003 (aged 22)	(Algeria) Youth system
Forwards
7	(Algeria)	Abdennour Belhocini	RW	18 August 1996 (aged 29)	(Algeria) CS Constantine
11	(Algeria)	Abderrahmane Meziane	LW	7 March 1994 (aged 31)	(Algeria) USM Alger
13	(Algeria)	Lofti Boussouar	ST	1 September 2004 (aged 20)	(Algeria) Youth system
17	(Algeria)	Islam Abbaci	RW	27 August 2005 (aged 19)	(Algeria) Youth system
20	(Tunisia)	Mohamed Ali Ben Hammouda	ST	24 July 1998 (aged 27)	(Egypt) Ghazl El Mahalla
22	(Algeria)	Mohamed Islam Belkhir	LW	16 March 2001 (aged 24)	(Algeria) Youth system
23	(Algeria)	Chafai Guergour	ST	20 February 2006 (aged 19)	(Algeria) Youth system
28	(Algeria)	Farid El Melali	LW	13 July 1997 (aged 28)	(France) Angers SCO

== Transfers ==
=== In ===
==== Summer ====
Date	Pos	Player	Moving from	Fee	Source
6 July 2025	ST	(Algeria) Islam Slimani	(Belgium) Mechelen	Loan return	
12 July 2025	ST	(Albania) Redon Xhixha	(Azerbaijan) Qarabağ FK	Free transfer	
12 July 2025	CM	(Algeria) Djaber Kaâssis	Paradou AC	Free transfer	
22 July 2025	CB	(Algeria) Younes Ouassa	Olympique Akbou	Free transfer	
30 July 2025	ST	(Tunisia) Mohamed Ali Ben Hammouda	(Egypt) Ghazl El Mahalla	Undisclosed	
31 July 2025	RW	(Algeria) Abdennour Belhocini	CS Constantine	Free transfer	
11 August 2025	AM	(Albania) Endri Çekiçi	(Turkey) Adanaspor	Undisclosed	
31 August 2025	ST	(Algeria) Farid El Melali	(France) Angers SCO	Free transfer	

==== Winter ====
Date	Pos	Player	Moving from	Fee	Source
10 December 2025	DM	(Algeria) Salim Boukhanchouche	USM Alger	Free transfer	
22 January 2026	GK	(Algeria) Tarek Bousseder	CR Belouizdad	Free transfer	
22 January 2026	AM	(Ivory Coast) Jean Charles Ahoua	(Tanzania) Simba SC	Undisclosed	
31 January 2026	CM	(Algeria) Necer Benzid	MB Rouissat	Free transfer	

=== Out ===
==== Summer ====
Date	Pos	Player	Moving to	Fee	Source
6 July 2025	FW	(Algeria) Aymen Mahious	(Switzerland) Yverdon-Sport	Loan return	
20 July 2025	MF	(Algeria) Oussama Daibeche	ES Sétif	Free transfer	
27 July 2025	GK	(Algeria) Redouane Maachou	MB Rouissat	Free transfer	
6 August 2025	ST	(Algeria) Merouane Zerrouki	Unattached	Free transfer (Released)	
22 August 2025	CM	(Ivory Coast) Arafat Doumbia	(Albania) Partizani Tirana	Free transfer (Released)	
24 August 2025	RW	(Algeria) Rezki Hamroune	Unattached (Note: Hamroune joined Olympique Akbou on 25 August 2025.)	Free transfer (Released)	
24 August 2025	ST	(Algeria) Islam Slimani	Unattached	Free transfer (Released)	
26 August 2025	RW	(Algeria) Ishak Boussouf	Unattached (Note: Boussouf joined MC Alger on 31 August 2025.)	Free transfer (Released)	
29 August 2025	DM	(Cameroon) Jacques Mbé	Unattached	Free transfer (Released)	
5 September 2025	FW	(South Africa) Khanyisa Mayo	(South Africa) Kaizer Chiefs	Loan for one season	

==== Winter ====
Date	Pos	Player	Moving to	Fee	Source
7 January 2026	ST	(Albania) Redon Xhixha	(Albania) Tirana	Free transfer	
10 January 2026	AM	(Albania) Endri Çekiçi	(Iraq) Zakho	Free transfer	
28 January 2026	DM	(Algeria) Housseyn Selmi	Unattached	Free transfer	
29 January 2026	GK	(Algeria) Moustapha Zeghba	MC Oran	Free transfer	

== Competitions ==
=== Overview ===
Competition	Record								Started round	Final position / round	First match	Last match
Competition	G	W	D	L	GF	GA	GD	Win %	Started round	Final position / round	First match	Last match
Ligue 1	30	14	11	5	47	24	+23	46.67	—N/a	3rd	30 August 2025	5 June 2026
Algerian Cup	6	5	0	1	17	8	+9	83.33	Round of 64	Runners–up	3 December 2025	30 April 2026
Confederation Cup	12	6	4	2	15	8	+7	50.00	Second round	Semi-finals	19 October 2025	17 April 2026
Total	48	25	15	8	79	40	+39	52.08				

Updated to match played 5 June 2026
Source: Competitions

=== Ligue 1 ===
==== League table ====
Pos	Team	Pld	W	D	L	GF	GA	GD	Pts	Qualification or relegation
1	MC Alger (C)	30	20	5	5	41	18	+23	65	Qualification for CAF Champions League
2	JS Saoura	30	16	7	7	40	26	+14	55	Qualification for CAF Champions League
3	CR Belouizdad	30	14	11	5	47	24	+23	53	Qualification for CAF Confederation Cup
4	MC Oran	30	14	7	9	36	31	+5	49	
5	JS Kabylie	30	11	12	7	40	31	+9	45	

Source: lfp.dz
Rules for classification: 1) Points; 2) Head-to-head points; 3) Head-to-head goal difference; 4) First half goal difference; 5) First half total goals; 6) Fairplay ranking; 7) Playoff.
(C) Champions

==== Results summary ====
Overall								Home						Away					
Pld	W	D	L	GF	GA	GD	Pts	W	D	L	GF	GA	GD	W	D	L	GF	GA	GD
30	14	11	5	47	24	+23	53	9	3	3	31	14	+17	5	8	2	16	10	+6

Last updated: 5 June 2026.
Source: Competitive matches

==== Results by round ====
Round	1	2	3	4	5	6	7	8	9	10	11	12	13	14	15	16	17	18	19	20	21	22	23	24	25	26	27	28	29	30
Ground	A	H	A	H	A	H	A	H	A	A	H	A	H	A	H	H	A	H	A	H	A	H	A	H	H	A	H	A	H	A
Result	L	W	D	L	D	D	D	W	W	W	D	W	W	D	L	L	W	W	D	D	D	W	L	W	W	D	W	W	W	D
Position	11	7	8	12	12	11	13	10	6	5	5	5	2	2	2	3	3	2	3	3	4	3	5	4	3	4	3	3	3	3

Updated to match(es) played on 5 June 2026. Source: Competitive matches
A = Away; H = Home; W = Win; D = Draw; L = Loss

==== Matches ====
The league fixtures were announced on 31 July 2025.

All times are local, WAT (UTC+1).

Win Draw Loss Postponed

30 August 2025 Round 2	CR Belouizdad	1–0	Paradou AC	Algiers
17:00	Belhocini 23'	Soccerway; LFP		Stadium: 20 August 1955 Stadium; Attendance: 0 (close doors); Referee: Mehdi Oukil; VAR: Ghada Mehat

6 September 2025 Round 3	USM Khenchela	1–1	CR Belouizdad	Khenchela
17:00	Chekal 33'	Soccerway; LFP	Ben Hammouda 72'	Stadium: Amar Hamam Stadium; Referee: Ayoub Belhachemi

13 September 2025 Round 4	CR Belouizdad	1–2	JS Saoura	Constantine (Note: CR Belouizdad host JS Saoura at the Chahid Hamlaoui Stadium in Constantine, due to the closure of the Stade du 5 Juillet and Nelson Mandela Stadium for renovations.)
19:00	Belhocini 25'	Soccerway; LFP	Boutiche 27'; Akacem 85'	Stadium: Chahid Hamlaoui Stadium; Attendance: 0 (close doors); Referee: Nabil Boukhalfa

20 September 2025 Round 5	MC El Bayadh	1–1	CR Belouizdad	El Bayadh
16:00	Bouhakak 84'	Soccerway; LFP	Çekiçi 52'	Stadium: Zakaria Medjdoub Stadium; Referee: Fateh Harkat

28 September 2025 Round 6	CR Belouizdad	2–2	CS Constantine	Algiers
16:00	Benayada 45+6' (pen.); Laouafi 87' (pen.)	Soccerway; LFP	Dib 27'; Benchaira 58'	Stadium: 20 August 1955 Stadium; Attendance: 0 (close doors); Referee: Mustapha Ghorbal; VAR: Tahar Boudjemaa

3 October 2025 Round 7	MB Rouissat	1–1	CR Belouizdad	Ouargla
18:00	Fatawu 68'	Soccerway; LFP	Fatawu 59' (o.g.)	Stadium: 18 February Stadium; Referee: Smail Hamlat

29 October 2025 Round 9	ASO Chlef	0–1	CR Belouizdad	Chlef
17:00		Soccerway; LFP	Laouafi 7'	Stadium: Mohamed Boumezrag Stadium; Referee: Nabil Boukhalfa

2 November 2025 Round 10	ES Mostaganem	0–2	CR Belouizdad	Mostaganem
17:00		Soccerway; LFP	Laouafi 23'; Benguit 84'	Stadium: Mohamed Bensaïd Stadium; Referee: Haithem Ghouti

8 November 2025 Round 11	CR Belouizdad	0–0	USM Alger	Algiers
14:30		Soccerway; LFP		Stadium: Stade du 5 Juillet; Referee: Akram Mechairia

8 December 2025 Round 1	MC Alger	2–1	CR Belouizdad	Douéra
20:00	Bayazid 23'; Bangoura 81'	Soccerway; LFP	El Melali 18'	Stadium: Ali La Pointe Stadium; Referee: Fateh Harkat
Note: The match between MC Alger and CR Belouizdad is postponed from August 21, to a later date, due to the presence of three players from MC Alger and five from CR Belouizdad with their national teams in the African Nations Championship.

20 December 2025 Round 13	CR Belouizdad	3–2	Olympique Akbou	Baraki
18:00	Boussouar 11'; Ben Hammouda 89', 90+2'	Soccerway; LFP	Zamoum 8'; Gherbi 69'	Stadium: Nelson Mandela Stadium; Referee: Mehdi Oukil

25 December 2025 Round 8	CR Belouizdad	3–1	ES Sétif	Algiers
19:30	Laouafi 63'; Boussouar 76'; Ben Hammouda 90+2'	Soccerway; LFP	Djahnit 85' (pen.)	Stadium: Stade du 5 Juillet; Referee: Youcef Tayeb Bouderbal

29 December 2025 Round 14	MC Oran	1–1	CR Belouizdad	Bir El Djir
17:00	Kerroum 53' (pen.)	Soccerway; LFP	Ben Hammouda 70'	Stadium: Miloud Hadefi Stadium; Referee: Rafik Aouina

3 January 2026 Round 12	ES Ben Aknoun	0–2	CR Belouizdad	Belouizdad
14:00		Soccerway; LFP	Benguit 80'; Ben Hammouda 89'	Stadium: 20 August 1955 Stadium; Referee: Tayeb Benyebka

9 January 2026 Round 15	CR Belouizdad	0–1	JS Kabylie	Algiers
18:00		Soccerway; LFP	Mahious 71'	Stadium: Stade du 5 Juillet; Referee: Alaa Bouab

20 February 2026 Round 20	CR Belouizdad	0–0	MC El Bayadh	Baraki
22:00		Soccerway; LFP		Stadium: Nelson Mandela Stadium; Referee: Yahia Dahar

26 February 2026 Round 21	CS Constantine	0–0	CR Belouizdad	Constantine
22:00		Soccerway; LFP		Stadium: Chahid Hamlaoui Stadium; Referee: Akram Mechairia

7 March 2026 Round 22	CR Belouizdad	3–1	MB Rouissat	Baraki
22:00	Boukhanchouche 8'; Benguit 29'; Ahoua 67'	Soccerway; LFP	Khiari 78'	Stadium: Nelson Mandela Stadium; Referee: Mustapha Ghorbal

18 March 2026 Round 24	CR Belouizdad	2–1	ASO Chlef	Baraki
22:00	Belkhir 20' (pen.); Ben Hammouda 61'	Soccerway; LFP	Debbari 25'	Stadium: Nelson Mandela Stadium; Referee: Haitham Ghouti

25 March 2026 Round 16	CR Belouizdad	0–1	MC Alger	Baraki
17:45		Soccerway; LFP	Naidji 3'	Stadium: Nelson Mandela Stadium; Attendance: 0 (close doors); Referee: Nabil Boukhalfa

1 April 2026 Round 17	Paradou AC	0–3	CR Belouizdad	Belouizdad
15:00		Soccerway; LFP	Belhocini 27'; Benzid 45+1'; Benguit 77'	Stadium: 20 August 1955 Stadium; Attendance: 0 (close doors); Referee: Tayeb Benyebka

5 April 2026 Round 25	CR Belouizdad	7–0	ES Mostaganem	Baraki
17:45	Benguit 11', 33', 63'; Khacef 24'; Boussouar 36', 61'; Ahoua 79'	Soccerway; LFP		Stadium: Nelson Mandela Stadium; Referee: Mehdi Oukil

4 May 2026 Round 18	CR Belouizdad	3–1	USM Khenchela	Baraki
17:45	Meziane 25'; Benguit 35' (pen.); Boukhanchouche 49'	Soccerway; LFP	Etouga 42'	Stadium: Nelson Mandela Stadium; Referee: Mustapha Ghorbal

8 May 2026 Round 28	Olympique Akbou	0–1	CR Belouizdad	Béjaïa
16:00		Soccerway; LFP	Benzid 27'	Stadium: Maghrebi Unity Stadium; Referee: Abdelali Ibrir

12 May 2026 Round 19	JS Saoura	0–0	CR Belouizdad	Béchar
20:00		Soccerway; LFP		Stadium: 20 August 1955 Stadium; Referee: Yahia Dahar

16 May 2026 Round 23	ES Sétif	3–1	CR Belouizdad	Sétif
18:00	Boubekeur 11'; Hamek 26'; Toual 43'	Soccerway; LFP	Laouafi 18'	Stadium: 8 May 1945 Stadium; Referee: Zine El Abidine Dekhane

20 May 2026 Round 29	CR Belouizdad	3–1	MC Oran	Baraki
20:00	Ben Hammouda 33'; Khacef 84'; Kelaleche 86'	Soccerway; LFP	Hamra 74'	Stadium: Nelson Mandela Stadium; Referee: Mehdi Oukil

24 May 2026 Round 27	CR Belouizdad	3–1	ES Ben Aknoun	Baraki
20:00	Laouafi 25', 34', 41'	Soccerway; LFP	Talah 11'	Stadium: Nelson Mandela Stadium; Referee: Ayoub Belhachemi

2 June 2026 Round 26	USM Alger	1–1	CR Belouizdad	Algiers
20:00	Khaldi 40' (pen.)	Soccerway; LFP	Ben Hammouda 4'	Stadium: Stade du 5 Juillet; Referee: Abdelali Ibrir

5 June 2026 Round 30	JS Kabylie	0–0	CR Belouizdad	Tizi Ouzou
20:00		Soccerway; LFP		Stadium: Hocine Aït Ahmed Stadium; Referee: Youcef Taieb Bouderbal

=== Algerian Cup ===
3 December 2025 Round of 64	CR Belouizdad	2–1 (a.e.t.)	ORB Oued Fodda	Baraki
19:00	Bekkour 17'; Meziane 91'	Report	Boukbouka 6'	Stadium: Nelson Mandela Stadium; Referee: Abdelali Ibrir

15 December 2025 Round of 32	WB Aïn Benian	1–5	CR Belouizdad	Algiers
19:00	Draoui 57'	Report	Benguit 37'; Keddad 45'; Boussouar 65', 88', 90+3'	Stadium: Stade du 5 Juillet; Referee: Mohamed Chaoubi

15 January 2026 Round of 16	CR Belouizdad	3–0	ASM Oran	Algiers
19:00	Ouassa 3'; Belkhir 72'; Ben Hammouda 81'	Report		Stadium: Stade du 5 Juillet; Referee: Ayoub Belhachemi

3 March 2026 Quarter-finals	CR Belouizdad	3–2 (a.e.t.)	MC Alger	Baraki
22:00	Ben Hammouda 17'; Khacef 46'; Laouafi 100'	Report	Ghezala 29' (pen.); Bangoura 90'	Stadium: Nelson Mandela Stadium; Referee: Tahar Boudjemaa; VAR: Youcef Taieb Bouderbal

24 April 2026 Semi-finals	CS Constantine	2–3	CR Belouizdad	Constantine
21:00	Dib 55'; Omoyele 90+7'	Report	Belhocini 17'; Ndiaye 58' (o.g.); Ben Hammouda 70'	Stadium: Chahid Hamlaoui Stadium; Referee: Alaa Bouab; VAR: Yahia Dahar

30 April 2026 Final	USM Alger	2–1	CR Belouizdad	Baraki
17:00	Kamagaté 22'; Khaldi 44'	Report	Ouassa 62'	Stadium: Nelson Mandela Stadium; Attendance: Akram Mechairia; VAR: Youcef Taieb Bouderbal; Referee: 25,000

=== Confederation Cup ===
==== Qualifying rounds ====
In the qualifying rounds, each tie will be played on a home-and-away two-legged basis. If the aggregate score will be tied after the second leg, the away goals rule will be applied, and if still tied, extra time will not be played, and a penalty shoot-out will be used to determine the winner (Regulations III. 13 & 14). The draw for the qualifying rounds was held on 9 August 2025, 10:00 GMT (13:00 local time, UTC+3), in Dar es Salaam, Tanzania.

===== Second round =====
19 October 2025 First leg	Hafia (Guinea)	1–1	(Algeria) CR Belouizdad	Thiès (Senegal)
16:00 UTC+0	Camara 62'	Report	Khacef 64'	Stadium: Stade Lat-Dior; Referee: Kossi Fabrice Senyo (Togo)
Note: CR Belouizdad Lineups: Chaâl, Bekkour, Laouafi, Benayada, Khacef, Boukerchaoui, Selmi (substituted off) 68' (Benguit, (substituted on) 68'), El Melali (substituted off) 79' (Abbaci, (substituted on) 79'), Meziane, Boussouar (substituted off) 68' (Belkhir, (substituted on) 68'), Ben Hammouda.

24 October 2025 Second leg	CR Belouizdad (Algeria)	2–0 (3–1 agg.)	(Guinea) Hafia	Baraki
18:00 UTC+1	Meziane 54'; Boussouar 68'	Report		Stadium: Nelson Mandela Stadium; Referee: Abdalaziz Yasir Ahmed (Sudan)
Note: CR Belouizdad Lineups: Chaâl, Bekkour, Laouafi, Benayada, Khacef, Boukerchaoui (substituted off) 46' (Selmi, (substituted on) 46'), Benguit (substituted off) 57' (Belhocini, (substituted on) 57'), Kaâssis, Meziane (substituted off) 84' (Belkhir, (substituted on) 84'), El Melali, Ben Hammouda (substituted off) 63' (Boussouar, (substituted on) 63').

==== Group stage ====
The draw for the group stage was held on 3 November 2025, 11:00 GMT (13:00 local time, UTC+2), in Johannesburg, South Africa. The 16 winners of the second round were drawn into four groups of four. The teams were seeded by their performances in the CAF competitions for the previous five seasons (CAF 5-year ranking points shown next to every team). Each group contained one team from each of Pot 1 and Pot 2, Pot 3 and Pot 4, and each team was allocated to the positions in their group according to their pot.

Pos	Team	Pld	W	D	L	GF	GA	GD	Pts	Qualification	CRB	ASO	SFC	SBS
1	(Algeria) CR Belouizdad	6	5	0	1	11	5	+6	15	Advance to knockout stage	—	2–1	2–0	2–0
2	(Republic of the Congo) AS Otohô	6	3	0	3	10	6	+4	9	Advance to knockout stage	4–1	—	3–0	2–1
3	(South Africa) Stellenbosch	6	1	2	3	2	9	−7	5 (Note: Ranked on away goals scored in head-to-head matches: Stellenbosch 1, Singida Black Stars 0.)		0–3	1–0	—	0–0
4	(Tanzania) Singida Black Stars	6	1	2	3	3	6	−3	5		0–1	1–0	1–1	—

Source: CAF
Notes:

22 November 2025 1	CR Belouizdad (Algeria)	2–0	(Tanzania) Singida Black Stars	Baraki
20:00 UTC+1	Chukwu 5' (o.g.); Benguit 14'	Report		Stadium: Nelson Mandela Stadium; Referee: Fabrício Duarte Andrade Santos (Cape Verde)

29 November 2025 2	AS Otohô (Republic of the Congo)	4–1	(Algeria) CR Belouizdad	Brazzaville
14:00 UTC+1	Bowamba 12'; Diallo 26'; Duvan 29'; Dion 65'	Report	Meziane 81' (pen.)	Stadium: Stade Alphonse Massemba-Débat; Referee: Celso Alvação (Mozambique)

25 January 2026 3	CR Belouizdad (Algeria)	2–0	(South Africa) Stellenbosch	Baraki
20:00 UTC+1	Belhocini 5'; El Melali 90+5' (pen.)	Report		Stadium: Nelson Mandela Stadium; Referee: Mutaz Ibrahim (Libya)

1 February 2026 4	Stellenbosch (South Africa)	0–3	(Algeria) CR Belouizdad	Cape Town
15:00 UTC+2		Report	Ben Hammouda 19'; Belhocini 80'; Abbaci 88'	Stadium: Athlone Stadium; Referee: Abdallah Jammeh (Gambia)

8 February 2026 5	Singida Black Stars (Tanzania)	0–1	(Algeria) CR Belouizdad	Zanzibar
19:00 UTC+3		Report	Belhocini 3'	Stadium: Amaan Stadium; Referee: Adalbert Diouf (Senegal)

15 February 2026 6	CR Belouizdad (Algeria)	2–1	(Republic of the Congo) AS Otohô	Baraki
17:00 UTC+1	Belhocini 14'; El Melali 41'	Report	Diallo 68'	Stadium: Nelson Mandela Stadium; Referee: Omar Sallah (Gambia)

==== knockout stage ====
Each tie in the knockout phase will be played over two legs, with each team playing one leg at home. The team that will score more goals on aggregate over the two legs will advance to the next round. If the aggregate score will be level, the away goals rule will be applied, i.e. the team that will score more goals away from home over the two legs will advance. If away goals will be also equal, then extra time will not be played and the winners will be decided by a penalty shoot-out (Regulations III. 26 & 27).

The draw for the knockout stage (quarter-finals and semi-finals), was held on 17 February 2026, 11:00 GMT (13:00 local time, UTC+2), at the CAF headquarters in Cairo, Egypt.

===== Quarter-finals =====
14 March 2026 First leg	Al Masry (Egypt)	1–1	(Algeria) CR Belouizdad	Suez
22:00 UTC+2	Mohsen 55' (pen.)	Report	Boussouar 90+1'	Stadium: Suez Stadium; Referee: Jean-Jacques Ndala (DR Congo)

21 March 2026 Second leg	CR Belouizdad (Algeria)	0–0 (1–1 agg.)	(Egypt) Al Masry	Baraki
20:00 UTC+1		Report		Stadium: Nelson Mandela Stadium; Referee: Brighton Chimene (Zimbabwe)

===== Semi-finals =====
10 April 2026 First leg	CR Belouizdad (Algeria)	0–1	(Egypt) Zamalek	Baraki
20:00 UTC+1		Report	Alvina 28'	Stadium: Nelson Mandela Stadium; Referee: Abongile Tom (South Africa)

17 April 2026 Second leg	Zamalek (Egypt)	0–0 (1–0 agg.)	(Algeria) CR Belouizdad	Cairo
18:00 UTC+2		Report		Stadium: Cairo International Stadium; Referee: Mahmood Ismail (Sudan)

== Squad information ==
=== Appearances and goals ===
As of 5 June 2026

No.	Pos	Player	Nat	Ligue 1			Algerian Cup			Confederation Cup			Total		
No.	Pos	Player	Nat	App	St	G	App	St	G	App	St	G	App	St	G
Goalkeepers
1	GK	Tarek Bousseder	(Algeria)	2	2	0	0	0	0	0	0	0	2	2	0
16	GK	Anes Mokhtar	(Algeria)	1	1	0	1	1	0	0	0	0	2	2	0
30	GK	Farid Chaâl	(Algeria)	27	27	0	5	5	0	12	12	0	44	44	0
Defenders
2	CB	Chouaib Keddad	(Algeria)	17	17	0	3	3	1	6	6	0	26	26	1
3	RB	Houcine Benayada	(Algeria)	27	26	1	6	6	0	12	12	0	45	44	1
4	CB	Abderrahmane Bekkour	(Algeria)	18	12	0	5	1	1	9	6	0	32	19	1
14	RB	Oussama Benkihoul	(Algeria)	0	0	0	0	0	0	0	0	0	0	0	0
21	CB	Youcef Laouafi	(Algeria)	28	28	8	6	6	1	12	12	0	46	46	9
24	LB	Naoufel Khacef	(Algeria)	24	22	2	3	3	1	9	9	1	36	34	4
25	CB	Younes Ouassa	(Algeria)	14	7	0	4	4	2	5	4	0	23	15	2
Midfielders
5	AM	Abdelmalek Kelaleche	(Algeria)	20	9	1	3	2	0	2	1	0	25	12	1
6	CM	Necer Benzid	(Algeria)	14	9	2	3	0	0	3	0	0	20	9	2
8	CM	Abderaouf Benguit	(Algeria)	24	22	8	5	5	1	10	9	1	39	36	10
10	AM	Jean Charles Ahoua	(Ivory Coast)	9	3	2	1	1	0	3	1	0	13	5	2
18	DM	Salim Boukhanchouche	(Algeria)	11	9	2	3	3	0	8	8	0	22	20	2
27	CM	Djaber Kaâssis	(Algeria)	23	21	0	5	5	0	7	2	0	35	28	0
29	CM	Bilal Boukerchaoui	(Algeria)	27	23	0	4	3	0	11	5	0	42	31	0
51	DM	Benahmed Bendahmane	(Algeria)	1	0	0	2	0	0	0	0	0	3	0	0
Forwards
7	RW	Abdennour Belhocini	(Algeria)	22	18	3	4	4	1	11	10	4	37	32	8
11	LW	Abderrahmane Meziane	(Algeria)	25	22	1	5	4	1	7	6	2	37	32	4
13	ST	Lofti Boussouar	(Algeria)	23	14	4	6	1	3	12	8	2	41	23	9
17	RW	Islam Abbaci	(Algeria)	10	1	0	2	0	0	3	0	1	15	1	1
20	ST	Mohamed Ali Ben Hammouda	(Tunisia)	25	14	9	6	4	3	11	8	1	42	26	13
22	RW	Mohamed Islam Belkhir	(Algeria)	22	8	1	6	2	1	12	4	0	40	14	2
23	ST	Chafai Guergour	(Algeria)	0	0	0	0	0	0	0	0	0	0	0	0
28	LW	Farid El Melali	(Algeria)	15	8	1	4	2	0	8	5	2	27	15	3
Players transferred out during the season
~~10~~	AM	Endri Çekiçi	(Albania)	8	5	1	2	2	0	2	2	0	12	9	1
~~19~~	ST	Redon Xhixha	(Albania)	5	2	0	0	0	0	0	0	0	5	2	0
~~15~~	DM	Housseyn Selmi	(Algeria)	6	1	0	1	1	0	4	2	0	11	4	0
~~1~~	GK	Moustapha Zeghba	(Algeria)	0	0	0	0	0	0	0	0	0	0	0	0
Total				30		47	6		17	12		14	48		79

Last updated: 5 June 2026
Source: soccerway.com

=== Goalscorers ===
As of 5 June 2026

Includes all competitive matches.

No.	Nat.	Player	Pos.	L1	AC	CC	TOTAL
20	(Tunisia)	Mohamed Ali Ben Hammouda	ST	9	3	1	13
8	(Algeria)	Abderaouf Benguit	DM	8	1	1	10
13	(Algeria)	Lofti Boussouar	ST	4	3	2	9
21	(Algeria)	Youcef Laouafi	LB	8	1	0	9
7	(Algeria)	Abdennour Belhocini	RW	3	1	4	8
11	(Algeria)	Abderrahmane Meziane	LW	1	1	2	4
24	(Algeria)	Naoufel Khacef	LB	2	1	1	4
28	(Algeria)	Farid El Melali	LW	1	0	2	3
22	(Algeria)	Mohamed Islam Belkhir	LW	1	1	0	2
10	(Ivory Coast)	Jean Charles Ahoua	AM	2	0	0	2
25	(Algeria)	Younes Ouassa	LB	0	2	0	2
18	(Algeria)	Salim Boukhanchouche	DM	2	0	0	2
6	(Algeria)	Necer Benzid	CM	2	0	0	2
3	(Algeria)	Houcine Benayada	CB	1	0	0	1
4	(Algeria)	Abderrahmane Bekkour	CB	0	1	0	1
2	(Algeria)	Chouaib Keddad	CB	0	1	0	1
17	(Algeria)	Islam Abbaci	RW	0	0	1	1
5	(Algeria)	Abdelmalek Kelaleche	AM	1	0	0	1
Players transferred out during the season
~~10~~	(Albania)	Endri Çekiçi	AM	1	0	0	1
Own Goals				1	1	1	3
Totals				47	17	15	79

=== Clean sheets ===
As of 5 June 2026

					Clean sheets			
No.	Nat	Name	GP	GA	L1	AC	CC	Total
1	(Algeria)	Tarek Bousseder	2	1	1	0	0	1
16	(Algeria)	Anes Mokhtar	2	3	0	0	0	0
30	(Algeria)	Farid Chaâl	44	36	11	1	7	19
Players transferred out during the season
~~1~~	(Algeria)	Moustapha Zeghba	0	0	0	0	0	0
		TOTALS		40	12	1	7	20
