= 2023–24 CR Belouizdad season =

CR Belouizdad
2023–24 season
- Owner: Madar Holding
- President: Mehdi Rabehi
- Head coach: Sven Vandenbroeck (from 19 July 2023) (until 8 October 2023); Marcos Paquetá (from 15 October 2023)
- Stadium: 20 August 1955 Stadium; Stade du 5 Juillet
- Ligue 1: 2nd
- Algerian Cup: Winners
- Champions League: Group stage
- Arab Cup: Group stage
- Top goalscorer: League: Leonel Wamba (10 goals); All: Leonel Wamba (16 goals)
- Biggest win: CR Belouizdad 4–0 US Biskra
- Biggest defeat: Young Africans 4–0 CR Belouizdad
| Home colours | Away colours | Third colours |

The 2023–24 season, is CR Belouizdad's 57th season and the club's 34th consecutive season in the top flight of Algerian football. In addition to the domestic league, CR Belouizdad are participating in this season's editions of the Algerian Cup, the Champions League and the Arab Cup.

== Squad list ==
Players and squad numbers last updated on 5 February 2024.
Note: Flags indicate national team as has been defined under FIFA eligibility rules. Players may hold more than one non-FIFA nationality.

| No. | Nat. | Position | Name | Date of Birth (Age) | Signed from |
Goalkeepers
| 1 | (Algeria) | GK | Alexis Guendouz | 26 January 1996 (aged 27) | (Algeria) USM Alger |
| 23 | (Algeria) | GK | Raïs M'Bolhi | 25 April 1986 (aged 37) | (Saudi Arabia) Al-Qadsiah |
| 26 | (Algeria) | GK | Redouane Maachou | 4 February 2001 (aged 22) | (Algeria) Youth system |
Defenders
| 2 | (Algeria) | CB | Chouaib Keddad | 25 July 1994 (aged 29) | (Algeria) ASO Chlef |
| 3 | (Algeria) | CB | Houcine Benayada | 8 August 1992 (aged 31) | (Morocco) Wydad AC |
| 4 | (Algeria) | CB | Mouad Hadded | 22 February 1997 (aged 26) | (Algeria) MC Alger |
| 5 | (Algeria) | CB | Achraf Boudrama | 25 May 1996 (aged 27) | (Saudi Arabia) Al-Qaisumah |
| 18 | (Algeria) | CB | Sofiane Bouchar | 21 May 1994 (aged 29) | (Kuwait) Al-Arabi |
| 20 | (Algeria) | LB | Youcef Laouafi | 1 January 1996 (aged 27) | (Tunisia) ES Sahel |
| 22 | (Algeria) | RB | Mokhtar Belkhiter | 15 January 1992 (aged 31) | (Tunisia) Club Africain |
| 24 | (Algeria) | LB | Naoufel Khacef | 27 October 1997 (aged 26) | (Turkey) Gaziantep |
Midfielders
| 6 | (Algeria) | MF | Abderaouf Benguit | 5 April 1996 (aged 27) | (Morocco) Raja CA |
| 8 | (Algeria) | MF | Mohamed Islam Bakir | 13 July 1996 (aged 27) | (Tunisia) CS Sfaxien |
| 10 | (Algeria) | MF | Ishak Boussouf | August 22, 2001 (aged 22) | (Belgium) Lommel |
| 12 | (Algeria) | MF | Belaïd Hamidi | 7 May 1996 (aged 27) | (Algeria) ES Sétif |
| 14 | (Mali) | MF | Mamadou Samaké | 15 May 2000 (aged 23) | (Tunisia) CA Bizertin |
| 15 | (Algeria) | MF | Housseyn Selmi | 11 February 1993 (aged 30) | (Algeria) CA Batna |
| 21 | (Algeria) | MF | Houssem Eddine Mrezigue | 23 March 2000 (aged 23) | (Portugal) F.C. Vizela |
| 25 | (Algeria) | MF | Adlène Guedioura | 12 November 1985 (aged 37) | (Qatar) Al-Wakrah |
Forwards
| 7 | (Algeria) | FW | Zineddine Boutmène | October 21, 2000 (aged 22) | (Tunisia) ES Sahel |
| 9 | (The Gambia) | FW | Lamin Jallow | 22 July 1994 (aged 29) | (Turkey) Keçiörengücü |
| 11 | (Algeria) | FW | Abderrahmane Meziane | March 7, 1994 (aged 29) | (Algeria) USM Alger |
| 13 | (Algeria) | FW | Oussama Darfalou | September 29, 1993 (aged 29) | (Netherlands) Emmen |
| 17 | (Algeria) | FW | Merouane Zerrouki | 25 January 2001 (aged 22) | (Algeria) Paradou AC |
| 19 | (Algeria) | FW | Mohamed Islam Belkhir | March 16, 2001 (aged 22) | (Algeria) Youth system |
| 27 | (Algeria) | FW | Mounir Belhaidja | November 28, 2001 (aged 21) | (Algeria) Youth system |
| 42 | (Cameroon) | FW | Leonel Wamba | 1 September 2002 (aged 21) | (Latvia) FK Spartaks Jūrmala |

== Transfers ==
=== In ===
==== Summer ====
| Date | Pos | Player | Moving from | Fee | Source |
|---|---|---|---|---|---|
| 16 July 2023 | FW | (Algeria) Oussama Darfalou | (Netherlands) Emmen | Free transfer | |
| 16 July 2023 | MF | (Algeria) Raouf Benguit | (Morocco) Raja CA | Free transfer | |
| 25 July 2023 | FW | (Algeria) Zineddine Boutmène | (Tunisia) ES Sahel | NA | |
| 26 July 2023 | MF | (Mali) Mamadou Samaké | (Tunisia) CA Bizertin | 150,000 € | |
| 6 August 2023 | FW | (Algeria) Abderrahmane Meziane | USM Alger | Free transfer | |
| 7 August 2023 | DF | (Algeria) Achraf Boudrama | (Saudi Arabia) Al-Qaisumah | Free transfer | |
| 9 August 2023 | FW | (Algeria) Merouane Zerrouki | Paradou AC | Free transfer | |
| 22 August 2023 | DF | (Algeria) Houcine Benayada | (Morocco) Wydad AC | Free transfer | |
| 22 August 2023 | FW | (The Gambia) Lamin Jallow | (Turkey) Keçiörengücü | Free transfer | |
| 1 September 2023 | GK | (Algeria) Raïs M'Bolhi | (Saudi Arabia) Al-Qadsiah | Free transfer | |
| 8 September 2023 | MF | (Algeria) Adlène Guedioura | (Qatar) Al-Wakrah | Free transfer | |

==== Winter ====
| Date | Pos | Player | Moving from | Fee | Source |
|---|---|---|---|---|---|
| 10 January 2024 | DF | (Algeria) Sofiane Bouchar | (Kuwait) Al-Arabi | Free transfer | |
| 22 January 2024 | DF | (Algeria) Naoufel Khacef | (Turkey) Gaziantep | Free transfer | |
| 4 February 2024 | MF | (Algeria) Belaïd Hamidi | ES Sétif | Loan return | |
| 5 February 2024 | MF | (Algeria) Houssem Eddine Mrezigue | (Portugal) F.C. Vizela | Loan return | |

=== Out ===
==== Summer ====
| Date | Pos | Player | Moving to | Fee | Source |
|---|---|---|---|---|---|
| 8 July 2023 | FW | (Nigeria) Anayo Iwuala | (Tunisia) ES Tunis | Loan return | |
| 21 July 2023 | DF | (Algeria) Ahmed Ait Abdesslem | Paradou AC | Free transfer | |
| 21 July 2023 | DF | (Algeria) Sofiane Bouchar | (Kuwait) Al-Arabi | Free transfer | |
| 22 July 2023 | MF | (Algeria) Zakaria Draoui | (Morocco) Wydad AC | Free transfer | |
| 10 August 2023 | MF | (Algeria) Abderrahmane Bourdim | Unattached | Free transfer (Released) | |
| 10 August 2023 | DF | (Algeria) Abdelmoumen Chikhi | Unattached | Free transfer (Released) | |
| 10 August 2023 | MF | (Algeria) Islam Boulouden | Unattached | Free transfer (Released) | |
| 14 August 2023 | MF | (Algeria) Belaid Hamidi | ES Sétif | Loan | |
| 29 August 2023 | MF | (Algeria) Houssem Eddine Mrezigue | (Portugal) Vizela | Loan | |
| 5 September 2023 | DF | (Algeria) Miloud Rebiaï | Unattached | Free transfer (Released) | |
| 6 September 2023 | DF | (Algeria) Azzedine Doukha | Unattached | Free transfer (Released) | |
| 10 September 2023 | GK | (Algeria) Ahmed Abdelkader | US Biskra | Free transfer | |
| 10 September 2023 | FW | (Algeria) Mohamed Belkhadem | US Souf | Loan | |
| 10 September 2023 | FW | (Algeria) Aymene Rahmani | US Souf | Loan | |

==== Winter ====
| Date | Pos | Player | Moving from | Fee | Source |
|---|---|---|---|---|---|
| 31 January 2024 | DF | (Algeria) Aimen Bouguerra | CS Constantine | Loan | |
| 31 January 2024 | DF | (Algeria) Chemseddine Bekkouche | Free agent | Free transfer (Released) | |
| 31 January 2024 | DF | (Algeria) Haroune Benmenni | Free agent | Free transfer (Released) | |

== Competitions ==
=== Overview ===
| Competition | Record | | | | | | | | Started round | Final position / round | First match | Last match |
| Competition | G | W | D | L | GF | GA | GD | Win % | Started round | Final position / round | First match | Last match |
|---|---|---|---|---|---|---|---|---|---|---|---|---|
| Ligue 1 | 30 | 15 | 8 | 7 | 37 | 20 | +17 | 50.00 | —N/a | 2nd | 23 September 2023 | 14 June 2024 |
| Algerian Cup | 6 | 4 | 2 | 0 | 10 | 4 | +6 | 66.67 | Round of 64 | Winners | 5 March 2024 | 5 July 2024 |
| Champions League | 8 | 4 | 2 | 2 | 13 | 8 | +5 | 50.00 | First round | Group stage | 17 September 2023 | 1 March 2024 |
| Arab Cup | 3 | 0 | 1 | 2 | 3 | 5 | −2 | 0.00 | Group stage | Group stage | 28 July 2023 | 3 August 2023 |
| Total | 47 | 23 | 13 | 11 | 63 | 37 | +26 | 48.94 | | | | |

Updated to match played 5 July 2024
Source: Competitions

=== Ligue 1 ===
==== League table ====
| Pos | Team | Pld | W | D | L | GF | GA | GD | Pts | Qualification or relegation |
|---|---|---|---|---|---|---|---|---|---|---|
| 1 | MC Alger (C) | 30 | 19 | 8 | 3 | 55 | 20 | +35 | 65 | Qualification for CAF Champions League |
| 2 | CR Belouizdad | 30 | 15 | 8 | 7 | 37 | 20 | +17 | 53 | Qualification for CAF Champions League |
| 3 | CS Constantine | 30 | 15 | 8 | 7 | 46 | 30 | +16 | 53 | Qualification for CAF Confederation Cup |
| 4 | USM Alger | 30 | 15 | 4 | 11 | 40 | 32 | +8 | 49 | Qualification for CAF Confederation Cup |
| 5 | ES Sétif | 30 | 14 | 6 | 10 | 37 | 37 | 0 | 48 | |

Source: the-sports.org
Rules for classification: 1) points; 2) head-to-head points; 3) head-to-head goal difference; 4) goal difference; 5) total goals; 6) fairplay ranking; 7) playoff.
(C) Champions

==== Results summary ====
| Overall | | | | | | | | Home | | | | | | Away | | | | | |
| Pld | W | D | L | GF | GA | GD | Pts | W | D | L | GF | GA | GD | W | D | L | GF | GA | GD |
|---|---|---|---|---|---|---|---|---|---|---|---|---|---|---|---|---|---|---|---|
| 30 | 15 | 8 | 7 | 37 | 20 | +17 | 53 | 10 | 2 | 3 | 22 | 9 | +13 | 5 | 6 | 4 | 15 | 11 | +4 |

Last updated: 14 June 2024.
Source: Competitive matches

==== Results by round ====
| Round | 1 | 2 | 3 | 4 | 5 | 6 | 7 | 8 | 9 | 10 | 11 | 12 | 13 | 14 | 15 | 16 | 17 | 18 | 19 | 20 | 21 | 22 | 23 | 24 | 25 | 26 | 27 | 28 | 29 | 30 |
|---|---|---|---|---|---|---|---|---|---|---|---|---|---|---|---|---|---|---|---|---|---|---|---|---|---|---|---|---|---|---|
| Ground | A | H | A | H | A | H | A | A | H | A | H | A | H | A | H | H | A | H | A | H | A | H | H | A | H | A | H | A | H | A |
| Result | W | W | W | L | L | W | W | D | W | D | W | L | D | D | W | W | D | D | L | L | W | W | W | L | W | D | W | D | L | W |
| Position | 2 | 1 | 1 | 2 | 4 | 3 | 2 | 2 | 2 | 2 | 2 | 2 | 2 | 2 | 2 | 2 | 2 | 2 | 2 | 3 | 3 | 3 | 3 | 3 | 2 | 2 | 2 | 2 | 3 | 2 |

Updated to match(es) played on 14 June 2024. Source: Competitive matches
A = Away; H = Home; W = Win; D = Draw; L = Loss

==== Matches ====
The league fixtures were announced on 24 August 2023.

All times are local, WAT (UTC+1).

Win Draw Loss Postponed

| 23 September 2023 Round 2 | CR Belouizdad | 1–0 | NC Magra | Belouizdad |
| 16:00 | Boussouf 90+7' | Report | | Stadium: 20 August 1955 Stadium; Referee: Mehadji Tayeb Bouderbali |

| 7 October 2023 Round 4 | CR Belouizdad | 2–3 | USM Khenchela | Belouizdad |
| 15:45 | Saâdou 25' (o.g.); Darfalou 45+2' | Report | Omoyele 7'; Rebai 43'; Ogbi 90' (pen.) | Stadium: 20 August 1955 Stadium; Referee: Abdellah Benchehida |

| 13 October 2023 Round 1 | US Souf | 0–3 | CR Belouizdad | El Oued |
| 15:30 | | Report | Meziane 16'; Boussouf 43'; Benguit 45+1' | Stadium: 1 November 1954 Stadium; Referee: Abdelali Ibrir |

| 10 November 2023 Round 5 | USM Alger | 2–1 | CR Belouizdad | Algiers |
| 17:00 | Kanou 64'; Benzaza 90+3' | Report | Wamba 62' | Stadium: Stade du 5 Juillet; Attendance: 0 (close doors); Referee: Mustapha Ghorbal |

| 14 November 2023 Round 3 | Paradou AC | 0–1 | CR Belouizdad | Dar El Beïda |
| 15:00 | | Report | Wamba 43' | Stadium: Omar Benrabah Stadium; Attendance: 0 (close doors); Referee: Hamza Bouslimani |

| 19 November 2023 Round 6 | CR Belouizdad | 1–0 | JS Kabylie | Algiers |
| 19:00 | Hadded 90+2' | Report | | Stadium: Stade du 5 Juillet; Referee: Akram Mechairia |

| 15 December 2023 Round 10 | ES Ben Aknoun | 1–1 | CR Belouizdad | Belouizdad |
| 15:15 | Hadji 76' | Report | Jallow 39' (pen.) | Stadium: 20 August 1955 Stadium; Referee: Lotfi Bekouassa |

| 28 December 2023 Round 11 | CR Belouizdad | 2–1 | CS Constantine | Algiers |
| 19:00 | Wamba 16', 66' | Report | Khaldi 72' | Stadium: Stade du 5 Juillet; Referee: Lahlou Benbraham |

| 9 January 2024 Round 7 | ES Sétif | 1–3 | CR Belouizdad | Sétif |
| 19:00 | Coulibaly 49' | Report | Wamba 5'; Laouafi 29'; Meziane 70' | Stadium: 8 May 1945 Stadium; Referee: Youcef Tayeb Bouderbal |

| 14 January 2024 Round 13 | CR Belouizdad | 0–0 | MC Alger | Algiers |
| 19:00 | | Report | | Stadium: Stade du 5 Juillet; Referee: Houssam Benyahia |

| 19 January 2024 Round 14 | ASO Chlef | 0–0 | CR Belouizdad | Chlef |
| 15:45 | | Report | | Stadium: Mohamed Boumezrag Stadium; Referee: Mohamed Saïdi |

| 23 January 2024 Round 8 | US Biskra | 0–0 | CR Belouizdad | Biskra |
| 17:00 | | Report | | Stadium: 18 February Stadium; Referee: Abdelmoumen Touabti |

| 27 January 2024 Round 15 | CR Belouizdad | 3–1 | JS Saoura | Algiers |
| 18:00 | Meziane 18'; Wamba 69'; Bouras 77' | Report | Benamar 27' | Stadium: Stade du 5 Juillet; Referee: Billel Bendjahene |

| 30 January 2024 Round 9 | CR Belouizdad | 2–0 | MC Oran | Algiers |
| 18:00 | Laouafi 45+9' (pen.); Meziane 75' | Report | | Stadium: Stade du 5 Juillet; Referee: Billel Soltani |

| 4 February 2024 Round 12 | MC El Bayadh | 2–1 | CR Belouizdad | El Bayadh |
| 15:30 | Messadi 11'; Belmiloud 44' | Report | Darfalou 70' | Stadium: Zakaria Medjdoub Stadium; Referee: Alaa Bouab |

| 10 February 2024 Round 16 | CR Belouizdad | 2–0 | US Souf | Algiers |
| 18:00 | Wamba 45+2' (pen.), 52' | Report | | Stadium: Stade du 5 Juillet; Referee: Ahmed Benhamou |

| 15 March 2024 Round 20 | CR Belouizdad | 0–1 | USM Alger | Algiers |
| 22:00 | | Report | Bacha 18' | Stadium: Stade du 5 Juillet; Referee: Youcef Gamouh |

| 19 March 2024 Round 17 | NC Magra | 0–0 | CR Belouizdad | Magra |
| 15:30 | | Report | | Stadium: Boucheligue Brothers Stadium; Referee: Houssam Benyahia |

| 24 March 2024 Round 21 | JS Kabylie | 0–1 | CR Belouizdad | Tizi Ouzou |
| 22:00 | | Report | Bouras 88' | Stadium: 1 November 1954 Stadium; Referee: Lahlou Benbraham |

| 4 April 2024 Round 22 | CR Belouizdad | 2–1 | ES Sétif | Algiers |
| 22:00 | Wamba 52' (pen.); Belkhir 53' | Report | Bouchoucha 90+4' | Stadium: Stade du 5 Juillet; Referee: Yahia Dahar |

| 16 April 2024 Round 18 | CR Belouizdad | 1–1 | Paradou AC | Algiers |
| 18:00 | Belkhir 82' | Report | Boukerma 54' | Stadium: Stade du 5 Juillet; Referee: Nabil Boukhalfa |

| 19 April 2024 Round 23 | CR Belouizdad | 4–0 | US Biskra | Algiers |
| 18:00 | Meziane 45', 90'; Khacef 46'; Boussouf 60' | Report | | Stadium: Stade du 5 Juillet; Referee: Akram Mechairia |

| 28 April 2024 Round 24 | MC Oran | 1–0 | CR Belouizdad | Oran |
| 19:00 | Boussalem 84' (pen.) | Report | | Stadium: Ahmed Zabana Stadium; Referee: Abdelmoumen Touabti |

| 4 May 2024 Round 19 | USM Khenchela | 2–1 | CR Belouizdad | Khenchela |
| 16:00 | Saâdou 47'; Sameur 90' (pen.) | Report | Meziane 64' | Stadium: Amar Hamam Stadium; Referee: Lahlou Benbraham |

| 11 May 2024 Round 25 | CR Belouizdad | 1–0 | ES Ben Aknoun | Algiers |
| 17:00 | Zerrouki 82' | Report | | Stadium: Stade du 5 Juillet; Referee: Billel Soltani |

| 17 May 2024 Round 26 | CS Constantine | 1–1 | CR Belouizdad | Constantine |
| 17:00 | Dib 16' (pen.) | Report | Laouafi 54' (pen.) | Stadium: Chahid Hamlaoui Stadium; Referee: Youcef Taieb Bouderbal |

| 26 May 2024 Round 27 | CR Belouizdad | 1–0 | MC El Bayadh | Belouizdad |
| 16:45 | Hadded 73' | Report | | Stadium: 20 August 1955 Stadium; Referee: Alaa Bouab |

| 7 June 2024 Round 28 | MC Alger | 0–0 | CR Belouizdad | Baraki |
| 16:45 | | Report | | Stadium: Nelson Mandela Stadium; Referee: Rafik Aouina |

| 11 June 2024 Round 29 | CR Belouizdad | 0–1 | ASO Chlef | Baraki |
| 16:45 | | Report | Bounoua 54' | Stadium: Nelson Mandela Stadium; Referee: Fodil Oukil |

| 14 June 2024 Round 30 | JS Saoura | 1–2 | CR Belouizdad | Béchar |
| 16:45 | Souibaâh 42' | Report | Wamba 35'; Laouafi 84' | Stadium: 20 August 1955 Stadium; Referee: Mehadji Tayeb Bouderbal |

=== Algerian Cup ===
| 5 March 2024 Round of 64 | JS Kabylie | 0–2 | CR Belouizdad | Tizi Ouzou |
| 18:00 | | Report | Benguit 52'; Wamba 57' (pen.) | Stadium: 1 November 1954 Stadium; Referee: Nabil Boukhalfa |
Note: CR Belouizdad Lineups: Guendouz, Keddad, Bouchar, Laouafi, Belkhiter, Benguit, Selmi, Bouras, Meziane, Belkhir (substituted off) 72' (Boussouf (substituted on) 72'), Wamba.

| 9 March 2024 Round of 32 | CR Belouizdad | 2–1 | AS Khroub | Algiers |
| 18:00 | Bouchar 29'; Meziane 45+2' | Report | Oukkal 52' (pen.) | Stadium: Stade du 5 Juillet; Referee: Rafik Aouina |
Note: CR Belouizdad Lineups: Guendouz, Hadded, Bouchar (substituted off) 35' (Boudrama (substituted on) 35'), Laouafi, Belkhiter, Benguit, Mrezigue, Boussouf (substituted off) 77' (Bakir (substituted on) 77'), Meziane, Belkhir (substituted off) 65' (Bouras (substituted on) 65'), Wamba.

| 29 March 2024 Round of 16 | CR Belouizdad | 2–0 | Olympique Akbou | Algiers |
| 22:00 | Meziane 73'; Benguit 78' | Report | | Stadium: Stade du 5 Juillet; Referee: Mustapha Ghorbal |
Note: CR Belouizdad Lineups: Guendouz, Kedddad, Bouchar, Benayada, Laouafi (substituted off) 88' (Khacef (substituted on) 88'), Benguit, Selmi (substituted off) 90' (Samaké (substituted on) 90'), Bouras (substituted off) 88' (Belkhir (substituted on) 88'), Boussouf (substituted off) 69' (Belkhiter (substituted on) 69'), Meziane, Wamba (substituted off) 90' (Boussouar (substituted on) 90').

| 12 April 2024 Quarter-finals | CR Belouizdad | 3–3 (a.e.t.) (4–2 p) | ES Mostaganem | Constantine |
| 17:30 | Belkhir 38'; Wamba 58'; Meziane 92' | Report | Salhi 16' (pen.); Ziad 90+3'; Chouari 111' | Stadium: Chahid Hamlaoui Stadium; Referee: Youcef Gamouh |
| | Penalties |
| | Laouafi (penalty scored); Mrezigue (penalty scored); Wamba (penalty scored); Bouras (penalty scored) | | (penalty scored) Ziad; (penalty missed) Salhi; (penalty scored) Ghanem; (penalty missed) Benhammou |
Note: CR Belouizdad Lineups: Maachou, Kedddad, Boudrama, Benayada, Laouafi, Benguit (substituted off) 85' (Mrezigue (substituted on) 85'), Selmi, Bouras, Boussouf (substituted off) 70' (Meziane (substituted on) 70'), Belkhir (substituted off) 85' (Belkhiter (substituted on) 85'), Wamba.

| 24 April 2024 Semi-finals | CR Belouizdad | 0–0 (a.e.t.) (3–1 p) | USM Alger | Baraki |
| 21:00 | | Report | | Stadium: Nelson Mandela Stadium; Referee: Lotfi Bekouassa |
| | Penalties |
| | Laouafi (penalty scored); Benguit (penalty missed); Belkhir (penalty scored); Wamba (penalty scored) | | (penalty missed) Belaïd; (penalty missed) Radouani; (penalty missed) Djahnit; (penalty scored) Alilet |
Note: CR Belouizdad Lineups: Guendouz (substituted off) 120' (Maachou (substituted on) 120'), Kedddad, Bouchar (substituted off) 88' (Hadded (substituted on) 88'), Benayada (substituted off) 117' (Belkhiter (substituted on) 117'), Khacef (substituted off) 117' (Laouafi (substituted on) 117'), Benguit, Selmi, Bouras (substituted off) 112' (Samaké (substituted on) 112') Meziane, Belkhir, Wamba.

| 5 July 2024 Final | MC Alger | 0–1 | CR Belouizdad | Algiers |
| 17:00 | | Report | Keddad 42' | Stadium: Stade du 5 Juillet; Referee: Mustapha Ghorbal |
Note: CR Belouizdad Lineups: Guendouz, Kedddad, Bouchar, Benayada, Khacef, Benguit (substituted off) 90+6' (Laouafi (substituted on) 90+6'), Selmi, Bouras (substituted off) 90' (Hadded (substituted on) 90'), Boussouf (substituted off) 82' (Zerrouki (substituted on) 82'), Meziane, Wamba.

=== Champions League ===
==== Qualifying rounds ====
In the qualifying rounds, each tie will be played on a home-and-away two-legged basis. If the aggregate score will be tied after the second leg, the away goals rule was applied, and if still tied, extra time will not be played, and the penalty shoot-out will be used to determine the winner (Regulations III. 13 & 14).

===== Second round =====
| 17 September 2023 First leg | Bo Rangers (Sierra Leone) | 1–3 | (Algeria) CR Belouizdad | Bo |
| 16:00 UTC+0 | Komeh 12' | Report | Meziane 42'; Darfalou 47', 78' | Stadium: Southern Arena Stadium; Referee: Joseph Odey Ogabor (Nigeria) |

| 2 October 2023 Second leg | CR Belouizdad (Algeria) | 3–1 (6–2 agg.) | (Sierra Leone) Bo Rangers | Oran |
| 18:00 UTC+1 | Wamba 78' (pen.), 80', 90' | Report | Turay 9' | Stadium: Miloud Hadefi Stadium; Referee: Muhamad Ali Musa (Niger) |

==== Group stage ====
The draw for the group stage was held on 6 October 2023 in Johannesburg, South Africa. The 16 winners of the second round of qualifying rounds were drawn into four groups of four.

The teams were seeded by their performances in the CAF competitions for the previous five seasons (CAF 5-Year Ranking points shown next to every team). Each group contained one team from each of Pot 1, Pot 2, Pot 3, and Pot 4, and each team was allocated to the positions in their group according to their pot.

| Pos | Team | Pld | W | D | L | GF | GA | GD | Pts | Qualification | AHL | YNG | CRB | MED |
|---|---|---|---|---|---|---|---|---|---|---|---|---|---|---|
| 1 | (Egypt) Al Ahly | 6 | 3 | 3 | 0 | 6 | 1 | +5 | 12 | Advance to knockout stage | — | 1–0 | 0–0 | 3–0 |
| 2 | (Tanzania) Young Africans | 6 | 2 | 2 | 2 | 9 | 6 | +3 | 8 (Note: Ranked on head-to-head goal difference: Young Africans +1, CR Belouizdad –1.) | Advance to knockout stage | 1–1 | — | 4–0 | 3–0 |
| 3 | (Algeria) CR Belouizdad | 6 | 2 | 2 | 2 | 7 | 6 | +1 | 8 | | 0–0 | 3–0 | — | 3–0 |
| 4 | (Ghana) Medeama | 6 | 1 | 1 | 4 | 3 | 12 | −9 | 4 | | 0–1 | 1–1 | 2–1 | — |

Source: CAF
Notes:

| 24 November 2023 1 | CR Belouizdad (Algeria) | 3–0 | (Tanzania) Young Africans | Algiers |
| 20:00 UTC+1 | Benguit 10'; Meziane 45+2'; Jallow 90+4' | Report | | Stadium: Stade du 5 Juillet; Referee: Alhadi Allaou Mahamat (Chad) |

| 1 December 2023 2 | Medeama (Ghana) | 2–1 | (Algeria) CR Belouizdad | Cape Coast |
| 16:00 UTC+0 | Lomotey 45'; Kamaradin 90+4' | Report | Benguit 39' (pen.) | Stadium: Cape Coast Sports Stadium; Referee: Lamin Jammeh (Gambia) |

| 8 December 2023 3 | Al Ahly (Egypt) | 0–0 | (Algeria) CR Belouizdad | Alexandria |
| 18:00 UTC+2 | | Report | | Stadium: Borg El Arab Stadium; Referee: Peter Waweru (Kenya) |

| 16 February 2024 4 | CR Belouizdad (Algeria) | 0–0 | (Egypt) Al Ahly | Algiers |
| 20:00 UTC+1 | | Report | | Stadium: Stade du 5 Juillet |

| 24 February 2024 5 | Young Africans (Tanzania) | 4–0 | (Algeria) CR Belouizdad | Dar es Salaam |
| 19:00 UTC+3 | Yahya 43'; Aziz Ki 46'; Musonda 48'; Gnadou 84' | Report | | Stadium: Benjamin Mkapa Stadium; Referee: Boubou Traoré (Mali) |

| 1 March 2024 6 | CR Belouizdad (Algeria) | 3–0 | (Ghana) Medeama | Algiers |
| 17:00 UTC+1 | Benguit 27'; Wamba 42'; Jallow 84' | Report | | Stadium: Stade du 5 Juillet; Referee: Bamlak Tessema Weyesa (Ethiopia) |

=== Arab Club Champions Cup ===
==== Group stage ====
| Pos | Team | Pld | W | D | L | GF | GA | GD | Pts | Qualification |
|---|---|---|---|---|---|---|---|---|---|---|
| 1 | (Morocco) Raja CA | 3 | 3 | 0 | 0 | 5 | 1 | +4 | 9 | Advance to knockout stage |
| 2 | (United Arab Emirates) Al-Wahda | 3 | 2 | 0 | 1 | 4 | 3 | +1 | 6 | Advance to knockout stage |
| 3 | (Algeria) CR Belouizdad | 3 | 0 | 1 | 2 | 3 | 5 | −2 | 1 | |
| 4 | Kuwait SC | 3 | 0 | 1 | 2 | 2 | 5 | −3 | 1 | |

Source: UAFA
Rules for classification: Group stage tiebreakers

| 28 July 2023 1 | CR Belouizdad (Algeria) | 1–2 | (Morocco) Raja CA | Abha |
| 14:00 UTC+1 | Hadded 10' | Report | Bouzok 58' (pen.); Arrassi 90+4' | Stadium: Prince Sultan bin Abdul Aziz Stadium; Referee: Ali Sabah (Iraq) |

| 31 July 2023 2 | Al-Wahda (United Arab Emirates) | 2–1 | (Algeria) CR Belouizdad | Abha |
| 14:00 UTC+1 | Kruspzky 44'; Guanca 61' | Report | Bouguerra 84' | Stadium: Prince Sultan bin Abdul Aziz Stadium; Referee: Khaled Al Teris (Saudi Arabia) |

| 3 August 2023 3 | CR Belouizdad (Algeria) | 1–1 | Kuwait SC | Khamis Mushait |
| 14:00 UTC+1 | Belkhir 6' | Report | Khenissi 87' (pen.) | Stadium: Damac Club Stadium; Referee: Mohammed Al Hoaish (Saudi Arabia) |

== Squad information ==
=== Playing statistics ===
| No. | Pos | Nat | Player | Total | | Ligue 1 | | Algerian Cup | | Champions League | | Arab Cup | |
| No. | Pos | Nat | Player | Apps | Goals | Apps | Goals | Apps | Goals | Apps | Goals | Apps | Goals |
Goalkeepers
| 1 | GK | (Algeria) ALG | Alexis Guendouz | 34 | 0 | 22 | 0 | 5 | 0 | 6 | 0 | 1 | 0 |
| 23 | GK | (Algeria) ALG | Raïs M'Bolhi | 8 | 0 | 6 | 0 | 0 | 0 | 2 | 0 | 0 | 0 |
| 26 | GK | (Algeria) ALG | Redouane Maachou | 5 | 0 | 2 | 0 | 2 | 0 | 0 | 0 | 1 | 0 |
Defenders
| 2 | DF | (Algeria) ALG | Chouaib Keddad | 35 | 1 | 23 | 0 | 5 | 1 | 7 | 0 | 0 | 0 |
| 3 | DF | (Algeria) ALG | Houcine Benayada | 36 | 0 | 27 | 0 | 4 | 0 | 5 | 0 | 0 | 0 |
| 4 | DF | (Algeria) ALG | Mouad Hadded | 37 | 3 | 25 | 2 | 3 | 0 | 7 | 0 | 2 | 1 |
| 5 | DF | (Algeria) ALG | Achraf Boudrama | 9 | 0 | 5 | 0 | 2 | 0 | 2 | 0 | 0 | 0 |
| 18 | DF | (Algeria) ALG | Sofiane Bouchar | 18 | 1 | 11 | 0 | 5 | 1 | 2 | 0 | 0 | 0 |
| 20 | DF | (Algeria) ALG | Youcef Laouafi | 36 | 4 | 21 | 4 | 6 | 0 | 7 | 0 | 2 | 0 |
| 22 | DF | (Algeria) ALG | Mokhtar Belkhiter | 39 | 0 | 26 | 0 | 5 | 0 | 6 | 0 | 2 | 0 |
| 24 | DF | (Algeria) ALG | Naoufel Khacef | 15 | 0 | 12 | 0 | 3 | 0 | 0 | 0 | 0 | 0 |
| 37 | DF | (Algeria) ALG | Mohamed Azzi | 9 | 0 | 6 | 0 | 0 | 0 | 2 | 0 | 1 | 0 |
| 72 | DF | (Algeria) ALG | Zouheyr Benyoub | 1 | 0 | 0 | 0 | 0 | 0 | 0 | 0 | 1 | 0 |
Midfielders
| 6 | MF | (Algeria) ALG | Abderaouf Benguit | 44 | 6 | 28 | 1 | 6 | 2 | 8 | 3 | 2 | 0 |
| 8 | MF | (Algeria) ALG | Mohamed Islam Bakir | 18 | 0 | 9 | 0 | 1 | 0 | 6 | 0 | 2 | 0 |
| 10 | MF | (Algeria) ALG | Ishak Boussouf | 38 | 3 | 25 | 3 | 5 | 0 | 5 | 0 | 3 | 0 |
| 12 | MF | (Algeria) ALG | Belaïd Hamidi | 0 | 0 | 0 | 0 | 0 | 0 | 0 | 0 | 0 | 0 |
| 14 | MF | (Mali) MLI | Mamadou Samaké | 18 | 0 | 10 | 0 | 2 | 0 | 4 | 0 | 2 | 0 |
| 15 | MF | (Algeria) ALG | Housseyn Selmi | 41 | 0 | 27 | 0 | 5 | 0 | 7 | 0 | 2 | 0 |
| 21 | MF | (Algeria) ALG | Houssem Eddine Mrezigue | 13 | 0 | 11 | 0 | 2 | 0 | 0 | 0 | 0 | 0 |
| 25 | MF | (Algeria) ALG | Adlène Guedioura | 7 | 0 | 5 | 0 | 0 | 0 | 2 | 0 | 0 | 0 |
| 38 | MF | (Algeria) ALG | Akram Bouras | 37 | 2 | 22 | 2 | 6 | 0 | 7 | 0 | 2 | 0 |
Forwards
| 7 | FW | (Algeria) ALG | Zineddine Boutmène | 8 | 0 | 5 | 0 | 0 | 0 | 1 | 0 | 2 | 0 |
| 9 | FW | (The Gambia) GAM | Lamin Jallow | 23 | 3 | 15 | 1 | 0 | 0 | 8 | 2 | 0 | 0 |
| 11 | FW | (Algeria) ALG | Abderrahmane Meziane | 43 | 12 | 29 | 7 | 6 | 3 | 8 | 2 | 0 | 0 |
| 13 | FW | (Algeria) ALG | Oussama Darfalou | 20 | 4 | 13 | 2 | 0 | 0 | 4 | 2 | 3 | 0 |
| 17 | FW | (Algeria) ALG | Merouane Zerrouki | 14 | 1 | 12 | 1 | 1 | 0 | 1 | 0 | 0 | 0 |
| 19 | FW | (Algeria) ALG | Mohamed Islam Belkhir | 37 | 4 | 23 | 2 | 5 | 1 | 6 | 0 | 3 | 1 |
| 27 | FW | (Algeria) ALG | Mounir Belhaidja | 2 | 0 | 0 | 0 | 0 | 0 | 0 | 0 | 2 | 0 |
| 34 | FW | (Algeria) ALG | Lotfi Boussouar | 14 | 0 | 13 | 0 | 1 | 0 | 0 | 0 | 0 | 0 |
| 42 | FW | (Cameroon) CMR | Leonel Wamba | 45 | 16 | 29 | 10 | 6 | 2 | 7 | 4 | 3 | 0 |
Players transferred out during the season
| 12 | DF | (Algeria) ALG | Chemseddine Bekkouche | 4 | 0 | 3 | 0 | 0 | 0 | 1 | 0 | 0 | 0 |
| 18 | DF | (Algeria) ALG | Haroune Benmenni | 0 | 0 | 0 | 0 | 0 | 0 | 0 | 0 | 0 | 0 |
| 21 | DF | (Algeria) ALG | Aimen Bouguerra | 6 | 1 | 3 | 0 | 0 | 0 | 1 | 0 | 2 | 1 |

Last updated: 5 July 2024
Source: soccerway.com

=== Goalscorers ===
As of 5 July 2024

Includes all competitive matches.

| No. | Nat. | Player | Pos. | L1 | AC | CCL | ACC | TOTAL |
|---|---|---|---|---|---|---|---|---|
| 42 | (Cameroon) | Leonel Wamba | FW | 10 | 2 | 4 | 0 | 16 |
| 11 | (Algeria) | Abderrahmane Meziane | FW | 7 | 3 | 2 | 0 | 12 |
| 6 | (Algeria) | Abderaouf Benguit | MF | 1 | 2 | 3 | 0 | 6 |
| 13 | (Algeria) | Oussama Darfalou | FW | 2 | 0 | 2 | 0 | 4 |
| 19 | (Algeria) | Mohamed Islam Belkhir | FW | 2 | 1 | 0 | 1 | 4 |
| 20 | (Algeria) | Youcef Laouafi | DF | 4 | 0 | 0 | 0 | 4 |
| 9 | (The Gambia) | Lamin Jallow | FW | 1 | 0 | 2 | 0 | 3 |
| 10 | (Algeria) | Ishak Boussouf | FW | 3 | 0 | 0 | 0 | 3 |
| 4 | (Algeria) | Mouad Hadded | DF | 2 | 0 | 0 | 1 | 3 |
| 38 | (Algeria) | Akram Bouras | MF | 2 | 0 | 0 | 0 | 2 |
| 21 | (Algeria) | Aimen Bouguerra | DF | 0 | 0 | 0 | 1 | 1 |
| 18 | (Algeria) | Sofiane Bouchar | DF | 0 | 1 | 0 | 0 | 1 |
| 24 | (Algeria) | Naoufel Khacef | DF | 1 | 0 | 0 | 0 | 1 |
| 17 | (Algeria) | Merouane Zerrouki | FW | 1 | 0 | 0 | 0 | 1 |
| 2 | (Algeria) | Chouaib Keddad | DF | 0 | 1 | 0 | 0 | 1 |
| Own Goals | | | | 1 | 0 | 0 | 0 | 1 |
| Totals | | | | 37 | 10 | 13 | 3 | 63 |
