= Oussama Darfalou =

Algerian footballer (born 1993)

Personal information
- Date of birth: 29 September 1993 (age 33)
- Place of birth: Menaâ, Algeria
- Height: 1.87 m (6 ft 2 in)
- Position: Forward

Team information
- Current team: US Biskra
- Number: 13

Youth career
- 2004–2008: A Bou Saâda
- 2008–2012: ES Sétif
- 2012–2014: USM Alger

Senior career*
Years	Team	Apps	(Gls)
2014–2015	RC Arbaâ	30	(12)
2015–2018	USM Alger	57	(30)
2018–2022	Vitesse	75	(16)
2020	→ VVV-Venlo (loan)	8	(3)
2022	→ PEC Zwolle (loan)	11	(2)
2022–2023	Maghreb de Fès	4	(2)
2023	Emmen	8	(0)
2023–2024	CR Belouizdad	13	(2)
2025	Shaanxi Union	10	(4)
2026	Olympique Akbou	5	(0)
2026–	US Biskra	0	(0)

International career^{‡}
2014–2016	Algeria U23	21	(5)
2016–2021	Algeria	3	(1)
- * Club domestic league appearances and goals as of 11 August 2026 ‡ National team caps and goals as of 24 October 2026

Oussama Darfalou (Arabic: أسامة درفلو; born 29 September 1993) is an Algerian professional footballer who plays as a forward for US Biskra.

== Club career ==
=== RC Arbaâ ===
Coming from USM Alger Reserve team, Oussama Darfalou spent his first professional contract with RC Arbaâ. On 16 August 2014, he made his debut for the team in the Ligue 1 against USM El Harrach as a starter and scored the winning goal. In that season Darfalou participated in all the matches in Ligue 1 and scored 12 goals, in the Algerian Cup from 6 games scored two goals and managed to lead his team to the final for the first time where they defeated against MO Béjaïa.

=== USM Alger ===
In June 2015, Darfalou was loaned out by RC Arbaâ to USM Alger for the 2015–16 season. but later USM Alger bought the player's contract and went on for three seasons, he made his debut for the team in the Ligue 1 against USM Blida as a substitute in 1–0 loss. Later Darfalou scored his first goal with the club against his former club RC Arbaâ in 4–0 victory. Darfalou suffered several injuries during the season and played only 13 games and scored four goals in all competitions, and despite that and in his first season achieved the first title in his professional career by winning the league title.

The following season improved the player's return despite suffering injuries on several occasions risked keep him out of play for nearly two months. However, he participated in 28 matches and scored 12 goals in all competitions, and in the first match of the season against MO Béjaïa scored a goal, as for his first goal in continental competitions was against Rail Club du Kadiogo in CAF Champions League in 2–0 victory. Later, he scored three goals in the same competition. That season Darfalou also achieved his second title, the Super Cup, although he did not participate because of injury. Finally, in the last game of the Ligue 1, Darfalou scored his first hat-trick in his career against JS Saoura.

The 2017–18 season was full of contrast for Darfalou. While from a collective point of view, his club, USM Alger, realized an average course finishing sixth in the standings and not winning any trophy, the striker succeeded in registering 24 goals in 38 games in all competitions. He distinguished himself by claiming the title of top scorer in the Algerian league with 18 goals in 27 games. At the end of the contract at the USMA at the end of the season, Darfalou decided not to remain at the Rouge et Noir and received solicitations from European clubs. It is first announced in Switzerland, Grasshopper Club Zürich, then in Germany, Hamburger SV. however, The HSV leaders, denied any contact with the player on 23 May 2018.

=== Vitesse ===
On 6 June 2018, Darfalou signed for Vitesse of the Eredivisie for four seasons to become the third Algerian to play there. He made his debut for the team in the Eredivisie as a substitute during a win against Groningen, later in the KNVB Cup Darfalou scored his first goal against RKAV Volendam in 2–1 victory. On 7 October he was in the starting line-up for the first time in the Eredivisie after his teammate Tim Matavž was injured, scoring a brace to lead Vitesse to win 4–0 at GelreDome against Heracles Almelo.

==== Loan to PEC Zwolle ====
On 3 January 2022, Darfalou joined PEC Zwolle on loan until the end of the season.

=== Maghreb de Fès ===
On 25 August 2022, Darfalou signed a two-year contract with Maghreb de Fès in Morocco.

=== Emmen ===
In January 2023, he joined Emmen.

=== CR Belouizdad ===
In July 2023, he joined CR Belouizdad.

=== Shaanxi Union ===
On February 27, 2025, Oussama Darfalou who has not been linked to any club since leaving CR Belouizdad, joined the Chinese club Shaanxi Union in the China League Two, with the ambition of rising to the Chinese elite fairly quickly.

=== Olympique Akbou ===
On 5 February 2026, he joined Olympique Akbou.

=== US Biskra ===
On 11 August 2026, he joined US Biskra.

== International career ==
In October 2018, Darfalou was called up by Djamel Belmadi for the first time for a 2019 Africa Cup of Nations qualifier against Benin as a replacement for his injured Islam Slimani.

== Career statistics ==
=== Club ===
As of 25 August 2024

Appearances and goals by club, season and competition
Club	Season	League			Cup		Continental		Other		Total	
Club	Season	Division	Apps	Goals	Apps	Goals	Apps	Goals	Apps	Goals	Apps	Goals
RC Arbaâ	2014–15	Algerian Ligue 1	30	12	6	2	—		—		36	14
USM Alger	2015–16	Algerian Ligue 1	11	4	0	0	2 (Note: Appearance(s) in CAF Champions League)	0	—		13	4
USM Alger	2016–17	Algerian Ligue 1	19	8	2	0	4	4	0 (Note: Appearance in Super Cup)	0	25	12
USM Alger	2017–18	Algerian Ligue 1	27	18	2	0	12 (Note: Seven appearances and three goals in Champions League, five appearances and five goals in Confederation Cup)	6	—		41	24
USM Alger	Total		57	30	4	0	18	10	0	0	79	40
Vitesse	2018–19	Eredivisie	25	7	3	1	1 (Note: Appearance(s) in UEFA Europa League)	0	—		29	8
Vitesse	2019–20	Eredivisie	6	0	2	2	—		—		8	2
Vitesse	2020–21	Eredivisie	32	8	4	0	—		—		36	8
Vitesse	2021–22	Eredivisie	12	1	0	0	8	0	—		20	1
Vitesse	Total		75	16	9	3	9	0	—		93	19
VVV-Venlo (loan)	2019–20	Eredivisie	8	3	0	0	—		—		8	3
PEC Zwolle (loan)	2021–22	Eredivisie	11	2	1	0	—		—		12	2
Maghreb de Fès	2022–23	Botola	4	2	0	0	—		—		4	2
Emmen	2022–23	Eredivisie	8	0	0	0	—		2	0	10	0
CR Belouizdad	2023–24	Algerian Ligue 1	13	2	0	0	4	2	3 (Note: Appearance(s) in Arab Club Champions Cup)	0	20	4
CR Belouizdad	2024–25	Algerian Ligue 1	—		—		2	0	—		2	0
CR Belouizdad	Total		13	2	0	0	6	2	3	0	22	4
Career total			206	67	20	5	33	12	5	0	263	84

=== International ===
Scores and results list Algeria's goal tally first, score column indicates score after each Darfalou goal.

List of international goals scored by Oussama Darfalou
No.	Date	Venue	Opponent	Score	Result	Competition
1	12 August 2017	Mohamed Hamlaoui Stadium, Constantine, Algeria	Libya	1–0	1–2	2018 African Nations Championship qualification

== Honours ==
USM Alger

- Algerian Ligue Professionnelle 1: 2015–16
- Algerian Super Cup: 2016

Individual

- Algerian Ligue Professionnelle 1 top scorer: 2017–18
