= Mohamed Azzi =

Algerian footballer (born 2002)

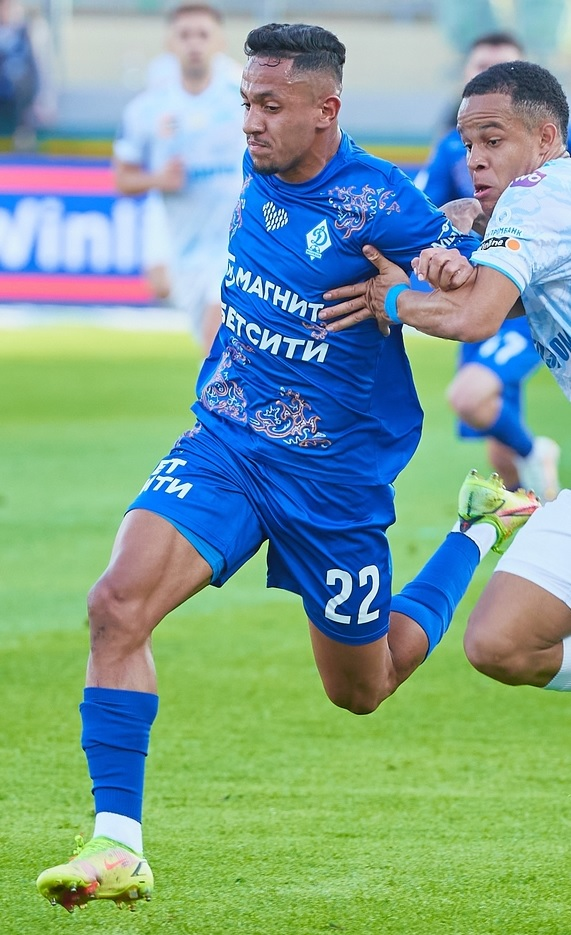
- Azzi with Dynamo Makhachkala in 2025

Personal information
- Date of birth: 11 May 2002 (age 24)
- Place of birth: Ouargla, Algeria
- Height: 1.77 m (5 ft 10 in)
- Positions: Right back; right midfielder

Team information
- Current team: CSKA Moscow
- Number: 21

Youth career
- –2018: IRB Ouargla
- 2018–2021: CR Belouizdad

Senior career*
Years	Team	Apps	(Gls)
2021–2025	CR Belouizdad	27	(0)
2025–2026	Dynamo Makhachkala	40	(2)
2026–	CSKA Moscow	9	(0)

International career^{‡}
2020–2022	Algeria U20	5	(0)
2022	Algeria U23	4	(0)
2026–	Algeria	1	(0)
- * Club domestic league appearances and goals as of 21 November 2026 ‡ National team caps and goals as of 14 November 2026

Mohamed Azzi (Arabic: محمد عزي; born 11 May 2002) is an Algerian footballer who plays as a right back or right midfielder for Russian club CSKA Moscow and the Algeria national team.

== Club career ==
On 13 February 2025, Azzi signed a long-term contract with Russian Premier League club Dynamo Makhachkala

He made his RPL debut for Dynamo Makhachkala on 8 March 2025 in a game against Dynamo Moscow.

On 2 September 2026, Azzi signed a contract with CSKA Moscow for four seasons, with an option for the fifth season.

== International career ==
Azzi made his debut for the Algeria national team on 14 November 2026 in an AFCON qualifier against Togo.

== Career statistics ==
As of 21 November 2026

Club	Season	League			Cup		Continental		Other		Total	
Club	Season	Division	Apps	Goals	Apps	Goals	Apps	Goals	Apps	Goals	Apps	Goals
CR Belouizdad	2020–21	Algerian Ligue Professionnelle 1	1	0	–		–		–		1	0
CR Belouizdad	2021–22	Algerian Ligue Professionnelle 1	1	0	–		–		–		1	0
CR Belouizdad	2022–23	Algerian Ligue Professionnelle 1	6	0	–		1 (Note: Appearances in the CAF Champions League)	0	–		7	0
CR Belouizdad	2023–24	Algerian Ligue Professionnelle 1	6	0	–		3 (Note: Two appearances in the CAF Champions League, one appearance in the Arab Club Champions Cup)	0	–		9	0
CR Belouizdad	2024–25	Algerian Ligue Professionnelle 1	13	0	1	0	7	0	0	0	21	0
CR Belouizdad	Total		27	0	1	0	11	0	0	0	39	0
Dynamo Makhachkala	2024–25	Russian Premier League	10	1	1	1	–		–		11	2
Dynamo Makhachkala	2025–26	Russian Premier League	25	1	7	1	–		2 (Note: Appearances in relegation play-offs)	0	34	2
Dynamo Makhachkala	2026–27	Russian Premier League	5	0	1	0	–		–		6	0
Dynamo Makhachkala	Total		40	2	9	2	0	0	2	0	51	4
CSKA Moscow	2026–27	Russian Premier League	9	0	2	1	–		–		11	1
Career total			76	2	12	3	11	0	2	0	101	5

== Personal ==
Both of Azzi's older brothers, Ayoub and Imad are professional footballers.

== Honours ==
CR Belouizdad

- Algerian Ligue Professionnelle 1: 2020–21, 2021–22, 2022–23
- Algerian Cup: 2023–24
