= Abderaouf Benguit =

Algerian footballer (born 1996)

Abdelraouf Benguit
Personal information
- Full name: Abdelraouf Benguit
- Date of birth: 5 April 1996 (age 30)
- Place of birth: Laghouat, Algeria
- Height: 1.74 m (5 ft 9 in)
- Position: Midfielder

Team information
- Current team: USM Alger
- Number: 8

Youth career
- 2008–2013: Paradou AC

Senior career*
Years	Team	Apps	(Gls)
2013–2019	Paradou AC	25	(0)
2016–2019	→ USM Alger (loan)	69	(5)
2019–2021	ES Tunis	74	(15)
2022	MC Alger	9	(1)
2022–2023	Raja CA	13	(0)
2023–2026	CR Belouizdad	77	(12)
2023–	USM Alger	0	(0)

International career^{‡}
2015–2016	Algeria Olympic	21	(0)
2017–	Algeria A'	2	(0)
2017–2018	Algeria	3	(0)
- * Club domestic league appearances and goals as of 13 July 2026 ‡ National team caps and goals as of 19 April 2023

Abdelraouf Benguit (Arabic: عبد الرؤوف بن قيط; born 5 April 1996) is an Algerian professional footballer who plays for USM Alger.

== Club career ==
A product of the Paradou AC youth academy, Benguit made his professional debut for the club on 14 August 2015, as a starter in the opening match of the 2015–16 Algerian Ligue Professionnelle 2 season against USM Bel-Abbès.

=== USM Alger ===
On 11 June 2016, he joined USM Alger, on loan from Paradou AC.

=== Espérance de Tunis ===
On 2 July 2019 Raouf Benguit joined Espérance de Tunis for four seasons coming from Paradou AC for 742,000 US$. He made his debut for Espérance in the Ligue 1 during a win against US Tataouine, later in the Champions League Benguit scored the winning goal against Elect-Sport his first goal with the club. On 15 March 2020 Benguit scored his first brace in Tunisian Cup against AS Marsa. In his first season, he won two titles, the Ligue Professionnelle 1 and the Super Cup And the most player who played matches this season with 42 and scored 7 goals.

=== MC Alger ===
In February 2022, he joined MC Alger.

=== Raja CA ===
In August 2022, he joined Raja CA.

=== CR Belouizdad ===
In July 2023, he joined CR Belouizdad.

=== USM Alger ===
In July 2026, he returned to USM Alger.

== International career ==
In November 2015 Benguit was selected as part of Algeria's squad for the 2015 Africa U-23 Cup of Nations in Senegal.

On 1 June 2017 Benguit was called up to the Algeria national football team for the first time for a friendly match against Guinea and a 2019 Africa Cup of Nations qualifier against Togo.

== Career statistics ==
=== Club ===
As of 19 September 2026

Club	Season	League			Cup		Continental		Other		Total	
Club	Season	Division	Apps	Goals	Apps	Goals	Apps	Goals	Apps	Goals	Apps	Goals
Paradou AC	2015–16	Ligue 2	24	1	3	0	—		–		27	1
USM Alger	2016–17	Ligue 1	26	1	3	0	7 (Note: All appearance(s) in Champions League)	0	0 (Note: Appearance in Algerian Super Cup)	0	36	1
USM Alger	2017–18	Ligue 1	15	0	2	0	9 (Note: three appearances in CAF Champions League, six appearances in CAF Confederation Cup)	0	—		26	0
USM Alger	2018–19	Ligue 1	28	4	3	1	6 (Note: All appearance(s) in CAF Confederation Cup)	1	3 (Note: All appearance(s) in Arab Club Champions Cup)	0	40	6
USM Alger	Total		69	5	8	1	22	1	3	0	102	7
ES Tunis	2019–20	Ligue 1	21	1	5	2	11 (Note: eight appearances and three goals in CAF Champions League, one appearance and one goal in CAF Super Cup, two appearances in FIFA Club World Cup)	4	5 (Note: one appearance in Tunisian Super Cup, four appearances in Arab Club Champions Cup)	0	42	7
ES Tunis	2020–21	Ligue 1	20	2	1	0	11	2	—		32	4
ES Tunis	Total		41	3	6	2	22	6	5	0	74	11
MC Alger	2021–22	Ligue 1	9	1	—		—		–		9	1
Raja CA	2022–23	Botola Pro	13	0	1	0	8	0	–		22	0
CR Belouizdad	2023–24	Ligue 1	28	1	6	2	8	3	2	0	44	6
CR Belouizdad	2024–25	Ligue 1	25	3	6	0	10	2	1	0	42	5
CR Belouizdad	2025–26	Ligue 1	24	8	5	1	10	1	–		39	10
CR Belouizdad	Total		77	12	17	3	28	6	3	0	125	21
USM Alger	2026–27	Ligue 1	3	0	0	0	0	0	0	0	0	0
USM Alger	Total		0	0	0	0	0	0	0	0	0	0
Career total			233	22	35	6	80	13	11	0	359	41

== Honours ==
=== Club ===
USM Alger

- Algerian Ligue Professionnelle 1 (1): 2018–19
- Algerian Super Cup (1): 2016
- CAF Super Cup: 2026

Espérance de Tunis

- Tunisian Ligue Professionnelle 1 (2): 2019–20, 2020–21
- Tunisian Super Cup (1): 2020
