= Lalmassia Training Campus =

Training ground of CR Belouizdad

- Location: Djasr Kasentina; Algiers
- Owner: CR Belouizdad
- Type: Football training ground

Construction
- Groundbreaking: 22 July 2025
- Built: 2025–2027
- Opened: 2027

Tenant
- CR Belouizdad (training) (2027–)

The Lalmassia Training Campus is the training ground and academy base of Algerian football club CR Belouizdad, located in Djasr Kasentina the southern suburbs of Algiers.

== Construction ==
On July 22, 2025, CR Belouizdad officially unveiled its ambitious training center. On paper, it is the largest complex ever envisioned by an Algerian club. CR Belouizdad has finally taken a major step forward with the presentation of its project, named Lalmasia. The name pays tribute to the club legend Hacène Lalmas, while also playing on the Arabic word "Al Almas" (meaning "Diamond"), and making a clear if slightly heavy handed nod to La Masia, the famed FC Barcelona academy. Initially planned in Reghaïa, on a three hectare plot allocated by the state as part of the professionalization process, the project underwent a major overhaul following the arrival of the MADAR Holding at the helm of the club. A year ago, this state owned holding owner notably of the former SNTA (entreprise public des tabacs) announced the purchase of a 19-hectare plot in the Gué de Constantine district, in the southern part of Algiers.

In the 3D renderings unveiled for the occasion, we see a futuristic, ultra modern complex made up of several buildings centered around at least six football pitches. The chosen site is located roughly five kilometers in a straight line from the Nelson Mandela Stadium, which CRB also claims as its home ground. Currently, the land hosts the Cosider Group’s sports center, a construction truck depot, and a series of barracks that once faced Algiers’ largest shantytown, which was demolished a decade ago.

== Facilities ==
- Pitch 1:
- Pitch 2:
- Pitch 3:
- Pitch 4:
- Pitch 5:
- Pitch 6:
- Pitch 7:
- Pitch 8:
