= Mouad Hadded =

Algerian footballer (born 1997)

Personal information
- Date of birth: 22 February 1997 (age 29)
- Place of birth: Algeria
- Height: 1.82 m (6 ft 0 in)
- Position: Defender

Team information
- Current team: MC Oran
- Number: 5

Youth career
- CA Batna

Senior career*
Years	Team	Apps	(Gls)
2017–2018	CA Batna		
2018–2020	JSM Skikda		
2020–2022	MC Alger	62	(2)
2022–2025	CR Belouizdad	51	(3)
2025–2026	Al Ahly Benghazi	22	(0)
2026	Kazma SC	1	(0)
2026–	MC Oran	0	(0)

International career^{‡}
2019	Algeria U23	1	(0)
2021–	Algeria A'	4	(0)
- * Club domestic league appearances and goals as of 20 July 2026 ‡ National team caps and goals as of 9 June 2022

Mouad Hadded (Arabic: معاذ حداد; born 22 February 1997) is an Algerian professional footballer who plays as a defender for MC Oran and the Algerian national football team.

== Career ==
In 2020, he signed a contract with MC Alger. In 2022, he signed a contract with CR Belouizdad.

In 2025, he joined Libyan club Al Ahly Benghazi. On 24 January 2026, he joined Kuwaiti club Kazma SC. On 19 July 2026, he joined to MC Oran.
