= Akram Bouras =

Algerian footballer (born 2002)

Personal information
- Date of birth: 23 February 2002 (age 24)
- Place of birth: Aïn Azel, Algeria
- Height: 1.84 m (6 ft 0 in)
- Position: Midfielder

Team information
- Current team: Levski Sofia
- Number: 47

Youth career
- ES Sétif

Senior career*
Years	Team	Apps	(Gls)
2020–2024	CR Belouizdad	66	(6)
2024–2025	MC Alger	28	(3)
2025–	Levski Sofia	32	(4)

International career
2020–2022	Algeria U20	2	(0)
2022	Algeria U23	2	(0)
- * Club domestic league appearances and goals as of 22 November 2026

Akram Bouras (Arabic: أكرم بوراس; born 23 February 2002) is an Algerian professional footballer who plays as a midfielder for Bulgarian First League club Levski Sofia.

== Career ==
In August 2024, Bouras signed a three-year contract with MC Alger.

== Honours ==
CR Belouizdad

- Algerian Ligue Professionnelle 1: 2020–21, 2021–22, 2022–23
- Algerian Cup: 2023–24

MC Alger

- Algerian Ligue Professionnelle 1: 2024–25
- Algerian Super Cup: 2024

Levski Sofia

- Bulgarian First Professional League: 2025–26

=== Individual ===
- Bulgarian First Professional League Team of the Season: 2025–26
