= Farid Chaâl =

Algerian footballer (born 1994)

Personal information
- Full name: Farid Chaâl
- Date of birth: 3 July 1994 (age 32)
- Place of birth: Beni Douala, Algeria
- Height: 1.96 m (6 ft 5 in)
- Position: Goalkeeper

Team information
- Current team: CR Belouizdad
- Number: 30

Youth career
- 2013–2014: MC Alger

Senior career*
| Years | Team | Apps | (Gls) |
| 2014–2023 | MC Alger | 127 | (0) |
| 2015–2016 | → USM El Harrach (loan) | 25 | (0) |
| 2023–2024 | Al-Najma | 30 | (0) |
| 2024– | CR Belouizdad | 29 | (0) |
- * Club domestic league appearances and goals as of 5 June 2026

Farid Chaâl (Arabic: فريد شعال; born 3 July 1994) is an Algerian footballer who currently plays for CR Belouizdad and the Algeria national team.

== Club career ==
In July 2015, Chaâl was loaned out by MC Alger to USM El Harrach for the 2015–16 Algerian Ligue Professionnelle 1 season.

On 9 June 2023, Chaâl joined Saudi Arabian club Al-Najma.

On 21 July 2024, Chaâl joined CR Belouizdad.
