= Khanyisa Mayo =

South African football player

Personal information
- Full name: Khanyisa Erick Mayo
- Date of birth: 27 August 1998 (age 28)
- Place of birth: Mthatha, South Africa
- Height: 1.78 m (5 ft 10 in)
- Position: Forward

Team information
- Current team: Kaizer Chiefs
- Number: 3

Senior career*
Years	Team	Apps	(Gls)
2017–2018	SuperSport United	0	(0)
2017–2018	→Ubuntu Cape Town (loan)	8	(2)
2018–2019	Maccabi	1	(0)
2019–2020	Royal Eagles	15	(11)
2020–2021	Richards Bay	36	(11)
2021–2024	Cape Town City	50	(39)
2024–2026	CR Belouizdad	27	(4)
2025–2026	→ Kaizer Chiefs (loan)	9	(2)
2026-	Kaizer Chiefs	0	(0)

International career^{‡}
2015	South Africa U17	18	(6)
2017	South Africa U20	1	(0)
2022–	South Africa	7	(0)
- * Club domestic league appearances and goals as of 15 April 2026 ‡ National team caps and goals as of 26 March 2024

Khanyisa Mayo (born 27 August 1998) is a South African professional footballer who plays as a forward for Kaizer Chiefs and the South Africa national football team.

== Club career ==
Mayo began his senior career in 2017 on loan with Ubuntu Cape Town in the National First Division, from SuperSport United. He transferred to Maccabi in 2018, making a solitary appearance that season. A stint at Royal Eagles followed in the first half of the 2019–20 season, and for the second half moved to Richards Bay. He earned a move to South African Premier Division side Cape Town City on 28 July 2021.

On 3 August 2024, it was announced that Mayo had signed for Algerian club CR Belouizdad on a three-year contract.

In September 2025, Mayo returned to South Africa and joined Kaizer Chiefs, one of his father's former clubs, on a year-long loan. At the end of the season, Chiefs made his loan deal permanent.

== International career ==
Mayo was called up to the South Africa national team for a set of friendlies in September 2022. He made his debut with them in a 4–0 friendly win over Sierra Leone on 24 September 2022.

== Personal life ==
Mayo is the son of the former South African international footballer Patrick Mayo.
