= Youcef Laouafi =

Algerian footballer (born 1996)

Personal information
- Full name: Youcef Amine Laouafi
- Date of birth: March 1, 1996 (age 30)
- Place of birth: Skikda, Algeria
- Height: 1.81 m (5 ft 11 in)
- Position: Left back

Team information
- Current team: CR Belouizdad
- Number: 21

Youth career
- –2015: CS Constantine

Senior career*
Years	Team	Apps	(Gls)
2015–2018	MC El Eulma	78	(16)
2018–2021	ES Sétif	53	(5)
2021–2022	ES Sahel	18	(1)
2022–	CR Belouizdad	95	(13)

International career^{‡}
2021–2023	Algeria A'	3	(0)
- * Club domestic league appearances and goals as of 5 June 2026 ‡ National team caps and goals as of 20 February 2026

Youcef Laouafi (Arabic: يوسف لعوافي; born January 19, 1996) is an Algerian footballer who plays for Algerian Ligue Professionnelle 1 club CR Belouizdad.

== Career ==
In 2018, Laouafi signes a three-year contract with ES Sétif. In 2021, Laouafi signes a three-year contract with ES Sahel. In 2022, he joined CR Belouizdad.

== Honours ==
CR Belouizdad

- Algerian Ligue Professionnelle 1: 2022–23
- Algerian Cup: 2023–24
