= Ishak Boussouf =

Algerian football player (born 2001)

Personal information
- Full name: Ishak Talal Boussouf
- Date of birth: August 22, 2001 (age 25)
- Place of birth: Mila, Algeria
- Position: Midfielder

Youth career
- ES Sétif

Senior career*
| Years | Team | Apps | (Gls) |
| 2019–2020 | ES Sétif | 8 | (1) |
| 2020–2023 | Lommel | 14 | (1) |
| 2022–2023 | → CR Belouizdad (loan) | 18 | (0) |
| 2023–2025 | CR Belouizdad | 25 | (3) |
| 2025 | MC Alger | 1 | (0) |
| 2026 | USM Khenchela | 1 | (0) |

International career^{‡}
| 2020 | Algeria U20 | 4 | (0) |
- * Club domestic league appearances and goals as of 5 June 2026 ‡ National team caps and goals as of 2 November 2020

Ishak Talal Boussouf (born August 22, 2001) is an Algerian professional footballer who plays as a midfielder.

== Club career ==
In the 2019–20 season Boussouf, started his career with the first team. His debut in Ligue 1 was against NA Hussein Dey, in which he came on as a substitute and provided an assist for Souibaâh in a 4–3 loss. Following his impressive performance, Boussouf signed his first professional contract on January 2, committing to a two-year deal. This decision came amid interest from clubs like ES Tunis and Monaco. The contract included a clause allowing him to leave for a European team if an official offer was received at the end of the season. A week later, Boussouf scored his first goals in 2–1 victory over MC Alger.

In October 2020, Boussouf joined Belgian side Lommel on a five-year deal. Boussouf was injured upon his arrival, he waited until 13 March 2021 to make his debut, he made his debut against Westerlo and his second match against Lierse where he had an opportunity of a goal by making a pass to a teammate.

After a season on loan, Boussouf joined CR Belouizdad on a permanent deal in July 2023, signing a two-year contract. On 31 August 2025, he signed for MC Alger. On 31 January 2026, he joined USM Khenchela.

== International career ==
Boussouf has represented Algeria at under-20 level.

== Career statistics ==
=== Club ===
As of 13 February 2020

| Club | Season | League | | | Cup | | Continental | | Other | | Total | |
| Club | Season | Division | Apps | Goals | Apps | Goals | Apps | Goals | Apps | Goals | Apps | Goals |
|---|---|---|---|---|---|---|---|---|---|---|---|---|
| ES Sétif | 2019–20 | Ligue 1 | 8 | 1 | 2 | 1 | — | | — | | 10 | 2 |
| Career total | | | 8 | 1 | 2 | 1 | — | | — | | 10 | 2 |
