= Naoufel Khacef =

Algerian footballer (born 1997)

Personal information
- Full name: Mohamed Naoufel Khacef
- Date of birth: 27 October 1997 (age 29)
- Place of birth: Kouba, Algiers, Algeria
- Height: 1.79 m (5 ft 10 in)
- Position: Left-back

Team information
- Current team: Al Ahly SC
- Number: 28

Youth career
- USM Blida
- 2015–2016: USM Alger

Senior career*
Years	Team	Apps	(Gls)
2016–2020	NA Hussein Dey	69	(5)
2020	→ Bordeaux B (loan)	2	(0)
2020–2023	Tondela	67	(0)
2023–2024	Gaziantep	20	(0)
2024–2026	CR Belouizdad	55	(5)
2026–	Al Ahly SC	1	(0)

International career^{‡}
2017–2018	Algeria U23	8	(0)
2021–	Algeria	9	(1)
- * Club domestic league appearances and goals as of 30 October 2026 ‡ National team caps and goals as of 10:00, 10 January 2023

Mohamed Naoufel Khacef (Arabic: محمد نوفل خاسف; born 27 October 1997) is an Algerian professional footballer who plays as a left-back for Al Ahly SC and the Algeria national team.

== Club career ==
In 2020, he played for Girondins de Bordeaux B. On 3 September 2020, Khacef joined Portuguese club Tondela. On 20 July 2023, he joined Turkish club Gaziantep. On 22 January 2024, Khacef joined CR Belouizdad. On 6 October 2026, he joined Libyan club Al Ahly SC.

== International career ==
In July 2015, Khacef was called up to the Algeria under-20 national team.

He made his debut for Algeria national football team on 29 March 2021 in a 2021 Africa Cup of Nations qualifier against Botswana.

=== International goals ===
Scores and results list Algeria's goal tally first, score column indicates score after each Khacef goal.

No.	Date	Venue	Opponent	Score	Result	Competition
1	9 June 2025	Mustapha Tchaker Stadium, Blida, Algeria	Rwanda	2–0	2–0	Friendly
