= Chouaïb Keddad =

Sudanese footballer (born 1994)

Personal information
- Date of birth: 25 June 1994 (age 32)
- Place of birth: Sidi M'Hamed, Algeria
- Height: 1.85 m (6 ft 1 in)
- Position: Defender

Team information
- Current team: CR Belouizdad
- Number: 2

Youth career
- -2016: CR Belouizdad

Senior career*
Years	Team	Apps	(Gls)
2016	RC Relizane	7	(0)
2016–2018	ASO Chlef	28	(0)
2018–	CR Belouizdad	168	(6)

International career^{‡}
2019–	Algeria	5	(0)
- * Club domestic league appearances and goals as of 5 June 2026 ‡ National team caps and goals as of 11 October 2021

Chouaïb Keddad (Arabic: شعيب كداد; born 25 July 1994) is an Algerian professional footballer who plays as a defender for CR Belouizdad and the Algeria national team.
