= Mohamed Islam Belkhir =

Algerian footballer (born 2001)

Personal information
- Full name: Mohamed Islam Belkhir
- Date of birth: 16 March 2001 (age 25)
- Place of birth: Oran, Algeria
- Position: Winger

Team information
- Current team: ES Sétif
- Number: 7

Youth career
- –2020: MC Oran

Senior career*
| Years | Team | Apps | (Gls) |
| 2020–2026 | CR Belouizdad | 139 | (21) |
| 2026– | ES Sétif | 1 | (0) |

International career^{‡}
| 2018–2020 | Algeria U20 | 10 | (2) |
| 2021– | Algeria A' | 2 | (1) |
| 2022– | Algeria U23 | 4 | (0) |
- * Club domestic league appearances and goals as of 3 September 2026 ‡ National team caps and goals as of 22 July 2022

Mohamed Islam Belkhir (Arabic: محمد إسلام بلخير; born 16 March 2001) is an Algerian footballer who plays for ES Sétif in the Algerian Ligue Professionnelle 1.

== Career ==
On 15 June 2026, he joined ES Sétif.

== International career ==
On 29 August 2021 Belkhir made his Algeria A' national team debut, starting and scoring in a 3–0 win over Burundi.
