= 2017–18 NA Hussein Dey season =

NA Hussein Dey
2017–18 season
- Chairman: Mahfoud Ould Zmirli
- Head coach: Nabil Neghiz (until 10 November 2017); Billel Dziri (from 11 November 2017)
- Stadium: Stade du 20 Août 1955
- Ligue 1: 3rd
- Algerian Cup: Round of 64
- Top goalscorer: League: Ahmed Gasmi (6); All: Ahmed Gasmi (6)

In the 2017–18 season, NA Hussein Dey competed in the Ligue 1 for the 42nd season, as well as the Algerian Cup.

== Non-competitive ==
=== Overview ===
Competition	Record								Started round	Final position / round	First match	Last match
Competition	G	W	D	L	GF	GA	GD	Win %	Started round	Final position / round	First match	Last match
Ligue 1	30	11	16	3	36	24	+12	36.67	—N/a	3rd	26 August 2017	19 May 2018
Algerian Cup	1	0	0	1	1	2	−1	0.00	Round of 64		29 December 2017	
Total	31	11	16	4	37	26	+11	35.48				

Updated to match played 19 May 2018
Source: Competitions

== League table ==
Pos	Team	Pld	W	D	L	GF	GA	GD	Pts	Qualification or relegation
1	CS Constantine (C)	30	16	9	5	36	26	+10	57	Qualification for the 2018–19 Champions League
2	JS Saoura	30	16	6	8	38	27	+11	54	Qualification for the 2018–19 Champions League
3	NA Hussein Dey	30	11	16	3	36	24	+12	49	Qualification for the 2018–19 Confederation Cup
4	MC Oran	30	12	9	9	40	37	+3	45	
5	MC Alger	30	12	8	10	41	32	+9	44	Qualification for 2018–19 Arab Club Champions Cup

Updated to match(es) played on 19 May 2018. Source: DZFoot
Rules for classification: 1) points; 2) head-to-head points; 3) head-to-head goal difference; 4) goal difference; 5) total goals; 6) fairplay ranking; 7) playoff.
(C) Champions

=== Results summary ===
Overall								Home						Away					
Pld	W	D	L	GF	GA	GD	Pts	W	D	L	GF	GA	GD	W	D	L	GF	GA	GD
30	11	16	3	36	24	+12	49	6	9	0	20	9	+11	5	7	3	16	15	+1

Last updated: 12 June 2018.
Source: Competitive matches

=== Results by round ===
Round	1	2	3	4	5	6	7	8	9	10	11	12	13	14	15	16	17	18	19	20	21	22	23	24	25	26	27	28	29	30
Ground	A	H	A	H	A	H	A	H	A	H	A	H	A	H	A	H	A	H	A	H	A	H	A	H	A	H	A	H	A	H
Result	L	D	D	W	D	D	L	D	D	D	W	D	D	W	W	D	W	D	D	W	D	D	W	W	D	W	W	W	D	L
Position	15	13	13	11	10	11	12	13	12	12	11	11	10	7	7	8	6	6	7	7	7	8	6	4	4	3	2	2	3	3

Updated to match(es) played on 12 June 2018. Source: Competitive matches
A = Away; H = Home; W = Win; D = Draw; L = Loss

=== Matches ===
Win Draw Loss

25 August 2017 Round 1	CS Constantine	3–1	NA Hussein Dey	Constantine
19:00	Belameiri 52', 68'; Zerara 58'	Soccerway report Live TV: None	67' Boulaouidet	Stadium: Stade Mohamed Hamlaoui; Referee: Mustapha Bessiri

7 September 2017 Round 2	NA Hussein Dey	1–1	USM Alger	Belouizdad
17:00	Gasmi 49' (pen.)	Soccerway report Live TV: Canal Algérie	74' Meziane	Stadium: August 20, 1955 Stadium; Referee: Abderrezzak Arab; Man of the Match: Harrag

16 September 2017 Round 3	MC Oran	0–0	NA Hussein Dey	Oran
17:00		Soccerway report Live TV: Canal Algérie		Stadium: Ahmed Zabana Stadium; Referee: Merzoug Brahimi

22 September 2017 Round 4	NA Hussein Dey	2–1	JS Kabylie	Belouizdad
17:00	Gasmi 35' (pen.); Cheurfaoui 73'	Soccerway report Live TV: EPTV Terrestre	24' Benaldjia	Stadium: Stade 20 Août 1955; Referee: Mehdi Abid Charef; Man of the Match: Benaldjia

30 September 2017 Round 5	USM Blida	2–2	NA Hussein Dey	Blida
16:00	Si Ammar 37'; Frioui 85' (pen.)	Soccerway report Live TV: None	27' Chouiter; 29' Addadi	Stadium: Mustapha Tchaker Stadium; Referee: Boubekeur Zouaoui

12 October 2017 Round 6	NA Hussein Dey	1–1	Paradou AC	Belouizdad
16:00	Addadi 23' (pen.)	Soccerway report Live TV: Canal Algérie	11' Ben Khelifa	Stadium: August 20, 1955 Stadium; Referee: Merzak Halalchi

17 October 2017 Round 7	JS Saoura	1–0	NA Hussein Dey	Béchar
19:00	Djallit 10'	Soccerway report		Stadium: Stade 20 Août 1955; Referee: Merzoug Brahimi

21 October 2017 Round 8	DRB Tadjenanet	1–1	NA Hussein Dey	Tadjenanet
15:00	Belmokhtar 90+5'	Soccerway report Live TV: None	58' Chouiter	Stadium: Lahoua Smaïl Stadium; Referee: Missoum Benabdellah

28 October 2017 Round 9	NA Hussein Dey	1–1	USM Bel-Abbès	Belouizdad
17:00	Oukkal 66'	Soccerway report Live TV: Algérie 3	63' (o.g.) Merbah	Stadium: Stade 20 Août 1955; Referee: Amine Hansal

4 November 2017 Round 10	USM El Harrach	0–0	NA Hussein Dey	Algiers
15:00		Soccerway report Live TV: None		Stadium: Stade 1er Novembre 1954; Referee: Ahmed Bouzrar

9 November 2017 Round 11	NA Hussein Dey	1–0	MC Alger	Belouizdad
16:00	Boulaouidet 90'	Soccerway report Live TV: Canal Algérie		Stadium: August 20, 1955 Stadium; Referee: Mehdi Abid Charef

18 November 2017 Round 12	US Biskra	0–0	NA Hussein Dey	Biskra
15:00		Soccerway report Live TV: None		Stadium: El Alia Sports Complex; Referee: Nabil Boukhalfa

2 December 2017 Round 13	NA Hussein Dey	0–0	ES Sétif	Belouizdad
16:00		Soccerway report Live TV: Canal Algérie		Stadium: Stade 20 Août 1955; Referee: Mustapha Bessiri

9 December 2017 Round 14	CR Belouizdad	0–2	NA Hussein Dey	Belouizdad
16:00		Soccerway report Live TV: Canal Algérie / Algérie 3	54' Brahimi; 69' Khacef	Stadium: Stade 20 Août 1955; Referee: Lotfi Bekouassa

16 December 2017 Round 15	NA Hussein Dey	2–0	Olympique de Médéa	Belouizdad
16:00	Gasmi 52'; Chekhrit 84'	Soccerway report Live TV: None		Stadium: Stade 20 Août 1955; Referee: Farouk Mial

6 January 2018 Round 16	NA Hussein Dey	1–1	CS Constantine	Belouizdad
16:00	Yousfi 75'	Soccerway report Live TV: Algérie 3	3' Cissé	Stadium: Stade 20 Août 1955; Referee: Nabil Boukhalfa

20 January 2018 Round 17	USM Alger	1–2	NA Hussein Dey	Algiers
16:00	Benyahia 90+3' (pen.)	Soccerway report Live TV: Canal Algérie	10' Addadi; 89' Ouadji	Stadium: July 5, 1962 Stadium; Referee: Abderrezzak Arab

26 January 2018 Round 18	NA Hussein Dey	1–1	MC Oran	Belouizdad
16:00	Alati 90+3' (pen.)	Soccerway report Live TV: Algérie 3	19' Toumi	Stadium: Stade 20 Août 1955; Referee: Boubekeur Zouaoui

10 February 2018 Round 19	JS Kabylie	1–1	NA Hussein Dey	Tizi Ouzou
16:00	Benaldjia 78'	Soccerway report Live TV: None	47' Brahimi	Stadium: November 1, 1954 Stadium; Referee: Mohamed Saïdi

15 February 2018 Round 20	NA Hussein Dey	4–1	USM Blida	Belouizdad
17:00	Brahimi 49'; Gasmi 67' (pen.); Harrag 69'; Khacef 85'	Soccerway report Live TV: None	59' (pen.) Frioui	Stadium: Stade 20 Août 1955; Referee: Farouk Mial

23 February 2018 Round 21	Paradou AC	1–1	NA Hussein Dey	Bologhine
16:00	Naidji 60'	Soccerway report Live TV: None	76' (pen.) Alati	Stadium: Omar Hamadi Stadium; Referee: Redouane Necib

10 March 2018 Round 22	NA Hussein Dey	0–0	JS Saoura	Belouizdad
16:00		Soccerway report Live TV: Algérie 3 / Canal Algérie		Stadium: Stade 20 Août 1955; Referee: Abderrezzak Arab

16 March 2018 Round 23	NA Hussein Dey	3–0	DRB Tadjenanet	Belouizdad
16:00	Zeghnoun 36'; Alati 89'; Chouiter 90+3'	Soccerway report Live TV: EPTV Terrestre / TV Tamazight 4		Stadium: Stade 20 Août 1955; Referee: Lahlou Benbraham

30 March 2018 Round 24	USM Bel-Abbès	0–1	NA Hussein Dey	Sidi Bel Abbès
16:00		Soccerway report Live TV: EPTV Terrestre / TV Tamazight 4	23' Khacef	Stadium: Stade 24 Fevrier 1956; Referee: Ahmed Bouzrar

7 April 2018 Round 25	NA Hussein Dey	1–1	USM El Harrach	Belouizdad
16:00	Addadi 29' (pen.)	Soccerway report Live TV: Canal Algérie	43' Bouguèche	Stadium: Stade 20 Août 1955; Referee: Farouk Mial

20 April 2018 Round 26	MC Alger	1–2	NA Hussein Dey	Algiers
16:00	Bendebka 72'	Soccerway report Live TV: Al-Kass Sports / Canal Algérie	45+2' Alati; 53' Ouertani	Stadium: July 5, 1962 Stadium; Referee: Boubekeur Zouaoui

24 April 2018 Round 27	NA Hussein Dey	2–1	US Biskra	Belouizdad
16:00	Gasmi 14'; Chouiter 68'	Soccerway report Live TV: None	27' (o.g.) Laribi	Stadium: Stade 20 Août 1955; Referee: Missoum Benabdellah

27 April 2018 Round 28	ES Sétif	1–2	NA Hussein Dey	Sétif
16:00	Banouh 88'	Soccerway report Live TV: Algérie 3	35' Gasmi; 55' Chouiter	Stadium: Stade 8 Mai 1945; Referee: Mohamed Saïdi

12 May 2018 Round 29	NA Hussein Dey	0–0	CR Belouizdad	Algiers
16:00		Soccerway report Live TV: Canal Algérie		Stadium: July 5, 1962 Stadium; Referee: Mehdi Abid Charef

19 May 2018 Round 30	Olympique de Médéa	3–1	NA Hussein Dey	Médéa
16:00	Abdelhafid 57'; Sameur 65' (pen.); Baouche 77'	Soccerway report Live TV: None	55' Chekhrit	Stadium: Stade Imam Lyes de Médéa; Referee: Mohamed Saïdi

== Algerian Cup ==
29 December 2017 Round of 64	CS Constantine	2–1	NA Hussein Dey	Constantine
16:00	Belkheir 79' (pen.); Zerara 85' (pen.)	Report; Live TV: Canal Algérie / TV Tamazight 4	9' Khiat	Stadium: Stade Mohamed Hamlaoui; Referee: Mustapha Ghorbal

== Squad information ==
=== Playing statistics ===
No.	Pos	Nat	Player	Total		Ligue 1		Algerian Cup	
No.	Pos	Nat	Player	Apps	Goals	Apps	Goals	Apps	Goals
Goalkeepers
30	GK	(Algeria) ALG	Kheireddine Boussouf	6	0	6	0	0	0
16	GK	(Algeria) ALG	Gaya Merbah	24	0	24	0	0	0
Defenders
20	DF	(Algeria) ALG	Walid Alati	27	4	27	4	0	0
28	DF	(Algeria) ALG	Tarek Cheurfaoui	15	1	15	1	0	0
4	DF	(Algeria) ALG	Mohamed Herida	1	0	1	0	0	0
39	DF	(Algeria) ALG	Naoufel Khacef	21	3	21	3	0	0
23	DF	(Algeria) ALG	Abdelghani Khiat	25	0	25	0	0	0
25	DF	(Algeria) ALG	Hocine Laribi	25	0	25	0	0	0
8	DF	(Algeria) ALG	Nadjib Maâziz	6	0	6	0	0	0
	DF	(Algeria) ALG	Lyes Oukkal	4	1	4	1	0	0
Midfielders
18	MF	(Algeria) ALG	Toufik Addadi	26	4	26	4	0	0
13	MF	(Algeria) ALG	Belkacem Brahimi	21	3	21	3	0	0
11	MF	(Algeria) ALG	Raouf Chouiter	30	5	30	5	0	0
	MF	(Algeria) ALG	Amine El Amali	2	0	2	0	0	0
6	MF	(Algeria) ALG	Hocine El Orfi	23	0	23	0	0	0
7	MF	(Algeria) ALG	Chamseddine Harrag	25	1	25	1	0	0
	MF	(Algeria) ALG	Assad Lakdja	3	0	3	0	0	0
	MF	(Algeria) ALG	Laid Ouadji	14	1	14	1	0	0
22	MF	(Algeria) ALG	Billel Ouali	5	0	5	0	0	0
17	MF	(Tunisia) TUN	Mehdi Ouertani	15	1	15	1	0	0
Forwards
15	FW	(Algeria) ALG	Mohamed Amine Chekhrit	15	2	15	2	0	0
10	FW	(Algeria) ALG	Ahmed Gasmi	23	6	23	6	0	0
	FW	(Algeria) ALG	Ali Haroun	7	0	7	0	0	0
	FW	(Algeria) ALG	Benamar Rahmoune	5	0	5	0	0	0
	FW	(Algeria) ALG	Abderrahmane Yousfi	10	1	10	1	0	0
14	FW	(Algeria) ALG	Mustapha Zeghnoun	13	1	13	1	0	0
Players transferred out during the season

Last updated: 12 June 2018
Source: fr.soccerway.com

== Squad list ==
As of August 25, 2017. Note: Flags indicate national team as defined under FIFA eligibility rules; some limited exceptions apply. Players may hold more than one non-FIFA nationality.

No.	Pos.	Nation	Player
4	DF	ALG	Mohamed Herida
6	MF	ALG	Hocine El Orfi
7	MF	ALG	Chamseddine Harrag
8	DF	ALG	Nadjib Maâziz
9	FW	ALG	Mohamed Boulaouidet
10	FW	ALG	Ahmed Gasmi
11	MF	ALG	Raouf Chouiter
12	FW	ALG	Hicham Chérif
13	MF	ALG	Belkacem Brahimi
14	FW	ALG	Mustapha Zergoune
15	FW	ALG	Mohamed Amine Chekhrit
16	GK	ALG	Gaya Merbah
17	MF	TUN	Mehdi Ouertani
18	MF	ALG	Toufik Addadi

No.	Pos.	Nation	Player
19	DF	ALG	Sofiane Boutebba
20	DF	ALG	Walid Alati
22	MF	ALG	Billel Ouali
23	MF	ALG	Abdelghani Khiat
25	MF	ALG	Hocine Laribi (captain)
26	FW	ALG	Oualid Ardji
28	DF	ALG	Tarek Cheurfaoui
27	MF	ALG	Zakaria Ouhadda
30	GK	ALG	Kheireddine Boussouf
35	DF	ALG	Abdelghani Bouzidi
39	DF	ALG	Naoufel Khacef
-	DF	ALG	Yacine Roudine
-	DF	ALG	Lyes Oukkal
-	DF	ALG	Mohamed Madjer

== Transfers ==
=== In ===
Date	Pos	Player	From club	Transfer fee	Source
16 June 2017	MF	(Algeria) Chamseddine Harrag	USM El Harrach	Free transfer	
24 June 2017	DF	(Algeria) Lyes Okkal	AS Khroub	Free transfer	
July 2017	MF	(Algeria) Maher Azzouz	CA Batna	Free transfer	
July 2017	MF	(Algeria) Walid Alati	US Biskra	Free transfer	
July 2017	MF	(Algeria) Raouf Chouiter	US Beni Douala	Free transfer	
July 2017	DF	(Algeria) Ibrahim Ferhat	US Biskra	Free transfer	
July 2017	MF	(Algeria) Toufik Addadi	Olympique de Médéa	Free transfer	
3 July 2017	GK	(Algeria) Kheireddine Boussouf	MC Alger	Free transfer	
10 July 2017	DF	(Algeria) Sofiane Boutebba	ES Sétif	Free transfer	
17 July 2017	DF	(Algeria) Mohamed Boulaouidet	JS Kabylie	Free transfer	
20 July 2017	DF	(Algeria) Tarek Cheurfaoui	CR Belouizdad	Free transfer	
20 July 2017	FW	(Algeria) Hicham Chérif	MC Oran	Free transfer	
27 December 2017	FW	(Algeria) Abderrahmane Yousfi	(France) US Créteil	Free transfer	

=== Out ===
Date	Pos	Player	To club	Transfer fee	Source
30 June 2017	FW	(Algeria) Lamine Abid	CS Constantine	Free transfer	
30 June 2017	GK	(Algeria) Azzedine Doukha	(Saudi Arabia) Ohod Club	Free transfer	
23 July 2017	DF	(Algeria) Hamza Zeddam	USM Blida	Free transfer	
23 July 2017	MF	(Algeria) Sofiane Bendebka	MC Alger	Free transfer	
21 December 2017	FW	(Algeria) Mohamed Boulaouidet	(Saudi Arabia) Ohod Club	Free transfer (Released)	
