= 2018–19 NA Hussein Dey season =

NA Hussein Dey
2018–19 season
- Chairman: Mahfoud Ould Zmirli
- Head coach: Billel Dziri (until 4 November 2018); Meziane Ighil (from 21 January 2019)
- Stadium: Stade du 20 Août 1955
- Ligue 1: 11th
- Algerian Cup: Quarter-finals
- Confederation Cup: Group stage
- Top goalscorer: League: Ahmed Gasmi (5); All: Ahmed Gasmi (8)

In the 2018–19 season, NA Hussein Dey competed in the Ligue 1 for the 43rd season, as well as the Confederation Cup, and the Algerian Cup.

== Mid-season ==
=== Overview ===
Competition	Record								Started round	Final position / round	First match	Last match
Competition	G	W	D	L	GF	GA	GD	Win %	Started round	Final position / round	First match	Last match
Ligue 1	30	9	9	12	22	29	−7	30.00	—N/a	11th	10 August 2018	26 May 2019
Algerian Cup	5	3	1	1	6	4	+2	60.00	Round of 64	Quarter-final	27 December 2018	28 March 2019
Confederation Cup	12	5	4	3	11	10	+1	41.67	Preliminary round	Group stage	27 November 2018	17 March 2019
Total	47	17	14	16	39	43	−4	36.17				

Updated to match played 28 May 2018
Source: Competitions

== League table ==
Pos	Team	Pld	W	D	L	GF	GA	GD	Pts
9	CA Bordj Bou Arreridj	30	9	10	11	22	24	−2	37
10	MC Oran	30	8	12	10	33	38	−5	36 (Note: Head-to-head: MC Oran 7 points; NA Hussein Dey 5 points; AS Aïn M'lila 3 points.)
11	NA Hussein Dey	30	9	9	12	22	29	−7	36
12	AS Aïn M'lila	30	7	15	8	20	30	−10	36
13	USM Bel Abbès	30	9	8	13	24	39	−15	35

Source: DZFoot
Rules for classification: 1) points; 2) head-to-head points; 3) head-to-head goal difference; 4) goal difference; 5) total goals; 6) fairplay ranking; 7) playoff.

=== Results summary ===
Overall								Home						Away					
Pld	W	D	L	GF	GA	GD	Pts	W	D	L	GF	GA	GD	W	D	L	GF	GA	GD
30	9	9	12	22	29	−7	36	6	5	4	9	8	+1	3	4	8	13	21	−8

Last updated: 28 May 2018.
Source: Competitive matches

=== Results by round ===
Round	1	2	3	4	5	6	7	8	9	10	11	12	13	14	15	16	17	18	19	20	21	22	23	24	25	26	27	28	29	30
Ground	A	H	A	A	H	A	H	A	H	A	H	A	H	A	H	H	A	H	H	A	H	A	H	A	H	A	H	A	H	A
Result	D	L	W	D	W	W	D	D	W	L	L	W	D	L	W	L	L	D	W	L	W	D	D	L	W	L	D	L	L	L
Position	5	12	9	8	6	4	5	3	3	4	5	4	4	6	5	6	7	8	8	8	8	8	8	8	8	8	8	8	9	11

Updated to match(es) played on 28 May 2018. Source: Competitive matches
A = Away; H = Home; W = Win; D = Draw; L = Loss

=== Matches ===
Win Draw Loss

10 August 2018 Round 1	CS Constantine	1–1	NA Hussein Dey	Constantine
21:00	Beldjilali 81'	Soccerway report	Khacef 90+3'	Stadium: Stade Mohamed Hamlaoui; Referee: Lahlou Benbraham

25 August 2018 Round 2	NA Hussein Dey	0–1	USM Alger	Belouizdad
17:00		Soccerway report	Ibara 44'	Stadium: Stade 20 Août 1955; Referee: Mehdi Abid Charef

28 August 2018 Round 3	DRB Tadjenanet	1–2	NA Hussein Dey	Tadjenanet
17:00	Aribi 64'	Soccerway report	Yaiche 47'; Khacef 90'	Stadium: Lahoua Smaïl Stadium; Referee: Redouane Necib

1 September 2018 Round 4	CA Bordj Bou Arreridj	0–0	NA Hussein Dey	Bordj Bou Arréridj
20:00		Soccerway report		Stadium: Stade 20 Août 1955; Referee: Mohamed Saïdi

10 September 2018 Round 5	NA Hussein Dey	1–0	JS Saoura	Belouizdad
17:00	Gasmi 13'	Soccerway report		Stadium: Stade 20 Août 1955; Referee: Rafik Achouri

15 September 2018 Round 6	MO Béjaïa	1–2	NA Hussein Dey	Béjaïa
17:45	Amokrane 90'	Soccerway report	Alati 55', 63'	Stadium: Stade de l'Unité Maghrébine; Referee: Abderrezzak Arab

22 September 2018 Round 7	NA Hussein Dey	0–0	USM Bel Abbès	Belouizdad
16:00		Soccerway report		Stadium: Stade 20 Août 1955; Referee: Ahmed Bouzrar

28 September 2018 Round 8	AS Ain M'lila	1–1	NA Hussein Dey	Batna
16:00	Kangou 17'	Soccerway report	Gasmi 43'	Stadium: November 1, 1954 Stadium; Referee: Lahlou Benbraham

5 October 2018 Round 9	NA Hussein Dey	2–1	Paradou AC	Belouizdad
16:00	Chouiter 73'; Gasmi 75'	Soccerway report	Naidji 51'	Stadium: Stade 20 Août 1955; Referee: Merzoug Brahimi

11 October 2018 Round 10	MC Alger	2–1	NA Hussein Dey	Algiers
17:45	Azzi 17'; Bendebka 74'	Soccerway report	Dib 90+1'	Stadium: July 5, 1962 Stadium; Referee: Farouk Mial

19 October 2018 Round 11	NA Hussein Dey	0–2	CR Belouizdad	Algiers
17:00		Soccerway report	Djarrar 34'; Chettal 86' (pen.)	Stadium: July 5, 1962 Stadium; Referee: Mustapha Ghorbal

5 November 2018 Round 13	NA Hussein Dey	0–0	Olympique de Médéa	Belouizdad
16:00		Soccerway report		Stadium: Stade 20 Août 1955; Referee: Mustapha Bessiri

13 November 2018 Round 14	JS Kabylie	2–1	NA Hussein Dey	Tizi Ouzou
17:45	Nwofor 22'; Hamroune 74'	Soccerway report	Dib 47'	Stadium: November 1, 1954 Stadium; Referee: Mohamed Saïdi

16 November 2018 Round 12	ES Sétif	0–1	NA Hussein Dey	Sétif
18:00		Soccerway report	Alati 15'	Stadium: Stade 8 Mai 1945; Referee: Redouane Necib

21 November 2018 Round 15	NA Hussein Dey	1–0	MC Oran	Belouizdad
16:00	Gasmi 68' (pen.)	Soccerway report		Stadium: Stade 20 Août 1955; Referee: Ahmed Bouzrar

4 January 2019 Round 16	NA Hussein Dey	0–1	CS Constantine	Belouizdad
15:00		Soccerway report	Abid 74'	Stadium: Stade 20 Août 1955; Referee: Mustapha Bessiri

15 January 2019 Round 17	USM Alger	4–1	NA Hussein Dey	Bologhine
17:45	Ibara 34' (pen.); Zouari 52'; Koudri 55'; Ellafi 70'	Soccerway report	Dib 50'	Stadium: Omar Hamadi Stadium; Referee: Lahlou Benbraham

31 January 2019 Round 18	NA Hussein Dey	0–0	DRB Tadjenanet	Belouizdad
15:00		Soccerway report		Stadium: Stade 20 Août 1955; Referee: Ahmed Bouzrar

27 January 2019 Round 19	NA Hussein Dey	1–0	CA Bordj Bou Arreridj	Belouizdad
15:00	Yaya 49'	Soccerway report		Stadium: Stade 20 Août 1955; Referee: Merzoug Brahimi

7 February 2019 Round 20	JS Saoura	1–0	NA Hussein Dey	Béchar
18:00	Yahia-Chérif 71'	Soccerway report		Stadium: Stade 20 Août 1955; Referee: Farouk Mial

2 April 2019 Round 25	NA Hussein Dey	1–0	MC Alger	Belouizdad
16:00	Mouaki Dadi 2'	Soccerway report		Stadium: Stade 20 Août 1955; Referee: Rafik Achouri

6 April 2019 Round 21	NA Hussein Dey	1–0	MO Béjaïa	Belouizdad
16:00	Yaya 38'	Soccerway report		Stadium: Stade 20 Août 1955; Referee: Mehdi Abid Charef

10 April 2019 Round 22	USM Bel Abbès	0–0	NA Hussein Dey	Sidi Bel Abbès
16:00		Soccerway report		Stadium: Stade 24 Fevrier 1956; Referee: Abderrezzak Arab

15 April 2019 Round 23	NA Hussein Dey	1–1	AS Ain M'lila	Belouizdad
16:00	Gasmi 23' (pen.)	Soccerway report	Tiaiba 28'	Stadium: Stade 20 Août 1955; Referee: Mustapha Ghorbal

21 April 2019 Round 26	CR Belouizdad	2–0	NA Hussein Dey	Belouizdad
16:00	Nessakh 18'; Bechou 86'	Soccerway report		Stadium: Stade 20 Août 1955; Referee: Ahmed Bouzrar

27 April 2019 Round 24	Paradou AC	2–1	NA Hussein Dey	Bologhine
16:00	Bouzok 35'; Naidji 76'	Soccerway report	Brahimi 81'	Stadium: Omar Hamadi Stadium; Referee: Missoum Benabdellah

11 May 2019 Round 27	NA Hussein Dey	0–0	ES Sétif	Belouizdad
16:00		Soccerway report		Stadium: Stade 20 Août 1955; Referee: Nabil Boukhalfa

16 May 2019 Round 28	Olympique de Médéa	1–0	NA Hussein Dey	Médéa
16:00	Addadi 40'	Soccerway report		Stadium: Stade Imam Lyes de Médéa; Referee: Rafik Achouri

21 May 2019 Round 29	NA Hussein Dey	2–1	JS Kabylie	Belouizdad
22:30	El Orfi 77'	Soccerway report	Belgherbi 64', 82'	Stadium: Stade 20 Août 1955; Referee: Ahmed Bouzrar

26 May 2019 Round 30	MC Oran	3–2	NA Hussein Dey	Oran
22:30	Heriat 3'; Nadji 64'; Mansouri 73'	Soccerway report	Boutmene 51', 77'	Stadium: Ahmed Zabana Stadium; Referee: Redouane Necib

== Algerian Cup ==
27 December 2018 Round of 64	Olympique Akbou	0–2	NA Hussein Dey	Béjaïa
15:00			Lakdja 61'; Chouiter 89'	Stadium: Stade de l'Unité Maghrébine; Referee: Youcef Gamouh

31 December 2018 Round of 32	USM Khenchela	1–1 (a.e.t.) (7–8 p)	NA Hussein Dey	Khenchela
14:00				Stadium: Amar Hammam Stadium

23 January 2019 Round of 16	NA Hussein Dey	1–0	MC Alger	Belouizdad
15:00	Gasmi 84' (pen.)			Stadium: Stade 20 Août 1955; Referee: Said Aouina

19 February 2019 QF 1st leg	CR Belouizdad	0–1	NA Hussein Dey	Algiers
17:45		Report	Khacef 36'	Stadium: Stade du 5 Juillet 1962; Referee: Mehdi Abid Charef

28 March 2019 QF 2nd leg	NA Hussein Dey	1–3	CR Belouizdad	Algiers
17:45	Yaya 42'	Report	Keddad 29', 60'; Sayoud 83' (pen.)	Stadium: Stade du 5 Juillet 1962; Referee: Lotfi Bekouassa

== Confederation Cup ==
=== Preliminary round ===
27 November 2018 First leg	NA Hussein Dey (Algeria)	2–0	(Republic of the Congo) Diables Noirs	Algiers
18:00 UTC+1	Gasmi 20'; Dadi 53'	Report		Stadium: Stade du 5 Juillet; Referee: Esam Al Jahani (Libya)

4 December 2018 Second leg	Diables Noirs (Republic of the Congo)	1–1	(Algeria) NA Hussein Dey	Brazzaville
15:30 UTC+1	Bidimbou 75'	Report	Ouertani 90'	Stadium: Stade Alphonse Massemba-Débat; Referee: Esterline Gonçalves Género (São Tomé and Príncipe)

=== First round ===
15 December 2018 First leg	Green Eagles (Zambia)	0–0	(Algeria) NA Hussein Dey	Lusaka
15:00 UTC+2		Report		Stadium: Nkoloma Stadium; Referee: Andofetra Rakotojaona (Madagascar)

22 December 2018 Second leg	NA Hussein Dey (Algeria)	2–1	(Zambia) Green Eagles	Algiers
17:45 UTC+1	Gasmi 37' (pen.), 90+6'	Report	Mulenga 3'	Stadium: Stade du 5 Juillet; Referee: Mfaume Ali Nassoro (Tanzania)

=== Play-off round ===
11 January 2019 First leg	Al-Ahly Benghazi (Libya)	1–0	(Algeria) NA Hussein Dey	Monastir (Tunisia) (Note: Teams from Libya are not allowed to host their home matches in their country due to security concerns.)
17:00 UTC+1	Bigermawi 90+5'	Report		Stadium: Stade Mustapha Ben Jannet; Referee: Peter Waweru (Kenya)

19 January 2019 Second leg	NA Hussein Dey (Algeria)	2–1	(Libya) Al-Ahly Benghazi	Algiers
17:45 UTC+1	Chouiter 34'; Gasmi 57' (pen.), 68'	Report	Azzi 48' (o.g.)	Stadium: Stade du 5 Juillet; Referee: Souleiman Ahmed Djama (Djibouti)

=== Group stage ===
==== Group D ====
Pos	Team	Pld	W	D	L	GF	GA	GD	Pts	Qualification	ZAM	GOR	NAH	PET
1	(Egypt) Zamalek	6	2	3	1	9	6	+3	9 (Note: Head-to-head goal difference: Zamalek +2, Gor Mahia –2.)	Quarter-finals	—	4–0	1–1	1–1
2	(Kenya) Gor Mahia	6	3	0	3	8	9	−1	9	Quarter-finals	4–2	—	2–0	1–0
3	(Algeria) NA Hussein Dey	6	2	2	2	4	6	−2	8		0–0	1–0	—	2–1
4	(Angola) Petro de Luanda	6	2	1	3	6	6	0	7		0–1	2–1	2–0	—

Source: CAF
Notes:

3 February 2019 1	NA Hussein Dey (Algeria)	2–1	(Angola) Petro de Luanda	Algiers
20:00 UTC+1	Tougaï 19'; Alati 54'	Report	Vá 76'	Stadium: Stade du 5 Juillet 1962; Referee: El Fadil Mohamed (Sudan)

13 February 2019 2	Zamalek (Egypt)	1–1	(Algeria) NA Hussein Dey	Alexandria
21:00 UTC+2	Boutaïb 14'	Report	Yaya 90'	Stadium: Borg El Arab Stadium; Referee: Daniel Laryea (Ghana)

24 February 2019 3	Gor Mahia (Kenya)	2–0	(Algeria) NA Hussein Dey	Kasarani
16:00 UTC+3	Kahata 84'; Tuyisenge 87'	Report		Stadium: Moi International Sports Centre; Referee: Abdoul Kanoso (Madagascar)

3 March 2019 4	NA Hussein Dey (Algeria)	1–0	(Kenya) Gor Mahia	Algiers
20:00 UTC+1	Yousfi 9'	Report		Stadium: Stade du 5 Juillet 1962; Referee: Boubou Traoré (Mali)

10 March 2019 5	Petro de Luanda (Angola)	2–0	(Algeria) NA Hussein Dey	Luanda
14:00 UTC+1		Report		Stadium: Estádio 11 de Novembro; Referee: Bernard Camille (Seychelles)

17 March 2019 6	NA Hussein Dey (Algeria)	0–0	(Egypt) Zamalek	Algiers
17:00 UTC+1		Report		Stadium: Stade du 5 Juillet 1962; Referee: Maguette N'Diaye (Senegal)

== Squad information ==
=== Playing statistics ===
No.	Pos	Nat	Player	Total		Ligue 1		Algerian Cup		Confederation Cup	
No.	Pos	Nat	Player	Apps	Goals	Apps	Goals	Apps	Goals	Apps	Goals
Goalkeepers
1	GK	(Algeria) ALG	Zakaria Bouhalfaya	1	0	1	0	0	0	0	0
16	GK	(Algeria) ALG	Gaya Merbah	22	0	13	0	3	0	6	0
30	GK	(Algeria) ALG	Kheireddine Boussouf	24	0	16	0	2	0	6	0
Defenders
3	MF	(Algeria) ALG	Mohamed Amine Tougai	23	2	14	1	2	0	7	1
5	DF	(Algeria) ALG	Lyes Oukkal	9	0	9	0	0	0	0	0
8	DF	(Algeria) ALG	Nadjib Maâziz	3	0	3	0	0	0	0	0
20	DF	(Algeria) ALG	Walid Alati	34	4	19	3	4	0	11	1
24	DF	(Algeria) ALG	Naoufel Khacef	38	3	22	2	4	1	12	0
4	DF	(Algeria) ALG	Zinedine Belaid	3	0	2	0	0	0	1	0
28	DF	(Algeria) ALG	Tarek Cheurfaoui	3	0	3	0	0	0	0	0
Midfielders
2	MF	(Algeria) ALG	Imadeddine Azzi	8	0	2	0	1	0	5	0
	MF	(Algeria) ALG	Nabil Bousmaha	10	0	7	0	3	0	0	0
	MF	(Algeria) ALG	Zine Eddine Boutmene	6	0	6	0	0	0	0	0
	MF	(Algeria) ALG	Abdellah Nacef	3	0	3	0	0	0	0	0
5	MF	(Algeria) ALG	Laid Ouadji	8	0	6	0	0	0	2	0
6	MF	(Algeria) ALG	Hocine El Orfi	23	1	17	1	1	0	5	0
7	MF	(Algeria) ALG	Chamseddine Harrag	38	0	25	0	2	0	11	0
11	MF	(Algeria) ALG	Raouf Chouiter	34	3	20	1	3	1	11	1
13	MF	(Algeria) ALG	Belkacem Brahimi	29	0	25	0	1	0	3	0
17	MF	(Tunisia) TUN	Mehdi Ouertani	34	1	19	0	4	0	11	1
18	MF	(Algeria) ALG	El Hocine Mouaki Dadi	31	3	23	2	2	0	6	1
21	MF	(Algeria) ALG	Malik Raiah	23	0	16	0	1	0	6	0
22	MF	(Algeria) ALG	Mohamed El Siddik Baali	2	0	0	0	0	0	2	0
23	MF	(Algeria) ALG	Abdelghani Khiat	29	0	18	0	4	0	7	0
25	MF	(Algeria) ALG	Hocine Laribi	31	0	21	0	1	0	9	0
8	MF	(Algeria) ALG	Faouzi Yaya	16	4	7	2	3	1	6	1
Forwards
19	FW	(Algeria) ALG	Assad Lakdja	5	1	3	0	1	1	1	0
9	FW	(Algeria) ALG	Abderrahmane Yousfi	23	1	15	0	3	0	5	1
10	FW	(Algeria) ALG	Ahmed Gasmi	35	11	24	5	3	1	8	5
	FW	(Algeria) ALG	Ali Haroun	1	0	1	0	0	0	0	0
15	FW	(Algeria) ALG	Ilyes Yaiche	31	1	18	1	3	0	10	0
26	FW	(Algeria) ALG	Brahim Dib	28	3	15	3	4	0	9	0
29	FW	(Cameroon) CMR	Landry Ntankeu Tchatchet	7	0	2	0	1	0	4	0
Players transferred out during the season
29	FW	(Mali) MLI	Moctar Cissé	2	0	2	0	0	0	0	0

Last updated: 11 June 2018
Source: fr.soccerway.com

== Squad list ==
As of August 10, 2018. Note: Flags indicate national team as defined under FIFA eligibility rules; some limited exceptions apply. Players may hold more than one non-FIFA nationality.

No.	Pos.	Nation	Player
1	GK	ALG	Zakaria Bouhalfaya
4	DF	ALG	Mohamed Herida
5	DF	ALG	Lyes Oukkal
6	MF	ALG	Hocine El Orfi
7	MF	ALG	Chamseddine Harrag
8	DF	ALG	Nadjib Maâziz
9	FW	ALG	Abderrahmane Yousfi
10	FW	ALG	Ahmed Gasmi
11	MF	ALG	Raouf Chouiter
12	DF	ALG	Yacine Roudine
13	MF	ALG	Belkacem Brahimi
14	FW	ALG	Mustapha Zergoune
15	FW	ALG	Ilyes Yaiche

No.	Pos.	Nation	Player
16	GK	ALG	Gaya Merbah
17	MF	TUN	Mehdi Ouertani
18	MF	ALG	El Hocine Mouaki Dadi
20	DF	ALG	Walid Alati
21	MF	ALG	Malik Raiah
22	MF	ALG	Mohamed El Siddik Baali
23	MF	ALG	Abdelghani Khiat
24	DF	ALG	Naoufel Khacef
25	MF	ALG	Hocine Laribi (captain)
26	FW	ALG	Brahim Dib
27	DF	ALG	Amir Bourekeb
29	FW	MLI	Moctar Cissé
30	GK	ALG	Kheireddine Boussouf

== Transfers ==
=== In ===
Date	Pos	Player	From club	Transfer fee	Source
29 May 2018	MF	(Algeria) Mohamed Amine Tougai	Youth system	First Professional Contract	
31 May 2018	DF	(Algeria) Zinedine Belaid	Youth system	First Professional Contract	
5 June 2018	MF	(Algeria) Malik Raiah	JS Kabylie	Free transfer	
9 July 2018	FW	(Algeria) Mohamed Baali	A Bou Saâda	Free transfer	
9 August 2018	FW	(Mali) Moctar Cissé	CS Constantine	Free transfer	
4 January 2019	FW	(Cameroon) Landry Ntankeu Tchatchet	(Democratic Republic of the Congo) TP Mazembe	Free transfer	

=== Out ===
Date	Pos	Player	To club	Transfer fee	Source
5 July 2018	DF	(Algeria) Mohamed Herida	DRB Tadjenanet	Free transfer	
6 July 2018	FW	(Algeria) Riad Aït-Abdelmalek	Olympique de Médéa	Free transfer	
9 July 2018	MF	(Algeria) Amine Lamali	USM El Harrach	Free transfer	
31 December 2018	FW	(Mali) Moctar Cissé	Unattached	Free transfer (Released)	
