= 2019–20 NA Hussein Dey season =

NA Hussein Dey
2019–20 season
- Chairman: Vacant
- Head coach: Arezki Remmane (until 26 October 2019); Lakhdar Adjali (from 5 November 2019) (until 8 January 2020); Azzedine Ait Djoudi (from 14 January 2020) (until 26 February 2020)
- Stadium: Stade du 20 Août 1955
- Ligue 1: 15th
- Algerian Cup: Round of 32
- Top goalscorer: League: Redouane Zerdoum (5 goals); All: Redouane Zerdoum (5 goals)

In the 2019–20 season, NA Hussein Dey competed in the Ligue 1 for the 44th season, as well as the Algerian Cup. On March 15, 2020, the Ligue de Football Professionnel (LFP) decided to halt the season due to the COVID-19 pandemic in Algeria. On July 29, 2020, the LFP declared that season is over and CR Belouizdad to be the champion, the promotion of four teams from the League 2, and scraping the relegation for the current season.

== Competitions ==
=== Overview ===
Competition	Record								Started round	Final position / round	First match	Last match
Competition	G	W	D	L	GF	GA	GD	Win %	Started round	Final position / round	First match	Last match
Ligue 1	22	4	7	11	14	27	−13	18.18	—N/a	15th	15 August 2019	14 March 2020
Algerian Cup	2	1	0	1	3	2	+1	50.00	Round of 64	Round of 32	26 December 2019	5 January 2020
Total	24	5	7	12	17	29	−12	20.83				

Updated to match played 3 June 2019
Source: Competitions

== League table ==
Pos	Team	Pld	W	D	L	GF	GA	GD	Pts	PPG
12	ASO Chlef	21	6	7	8	15	17	−2	25	1.19
13	CA Bordj Bou Arreridj	22	6	7	9	22	29	−7	25	1.14
14	US Biskra	22	6	3	13	17	33	−16	21	0.95
15	NA Hussein Dey	22	4	7	11	14	27	−13	19 (Note: Head-to-head points: Magra 3, Hussein Day 0)	0.86
16	NC Magra	22	4	7	11	16	30	−14	19	0.86

Updated to match(es) played on 15 March 2020. Source: dzfoot.com
Rules for classification: 1) points; 2) head-to-head points; 3) head-to-head goal difference; 4) goal difference; 5) total goals; 6) fairplay ranking; 7) playoff.

=== Results summary ===
Overall								Home						Away					
Pld	W	D	L	GF	GA	GD	Pts	W	D	L	GF	GA	GD	W	D	L	GF	GA	GD
22	4	7	11	14	27	−13	19	3	4	4	10	14	−4	1	3	7	4	13	−9

Last updated: 22 April 2018.
Source: Competitive matches

=== Results by round ===
Round	1	2	3	4	5	6	7	8	9	10	11	12	13	14	15	16	17	18	19	20	21	22	23	24	25	26	27	28	29	30
Ground	H	A	H	A	H	A	H	A	H	A	H	A	H	H	A	A	H	A	H	A	H	A	H	A	H	A	H	A	A	H
Result	D	D	L	D	W	L	D	L	W	D	D	L	L	L	W	L	L	L	D	L	W	L	C	C	C	C	C	C	C	C
Position																							15	15	15	15	15	15	15	15

Updated to match(es) played on 22 April 2019. Source: Competitive matches
A = Away; H = Home; W = Win; D = Draw; L = Loss

=== Matches ===
Win Draw Loss

15 August 2019 Round 1	NA Hussein Dey	0–0	JS Kabylie	El Harrach (Note: NA Hussein Dey played their home match against JS Kabylie at November 1, 1954 Stadium, El Harrach, instead of their regular stadium Stade 20 Août 1955, Belouizdad, due to renovation.)
17:00		Soccerway report		Stadium: November 1, 1954 Stadium; Referee: Abdellali Ibrir

24 August 2019 Round 2	ASO Chlef	0–0	NA Hussein Dey	Chlef
20:00		Soccerway report		Stadium: Stade Mohamed Boumezrag; Attendance: 0 (close doors); Referee: Redouane Necib

31 August 2019 Round 3	NA Hussein Dey	1–2	CR Belouizdad	Algiers (Note: NA Hussein Dey played their home match against CR Belouizdad at July 5, 1962 Stadium, Algiers, instead of their regular stadium Stade 20 Août 1955, Belouizdad, due to renovation.)
21:00	Zerdoum 18'	Soccerway report	N’Guessan 8'; Keddad 42'	Stadium: July 5, 1962 Stadium; Referee: Mustapha Ghorbal

12 September 2019 Round 4	USM Bel Abbès	1–1	NA Hussein Dey	Sidi Bel Abbès
17:45	Belhocini 33' (pen.)	Soccerway report	Zerdoum 68'	Stadium: Stade 24 Fevrier 1956; Referee: Rafik Achouri

23 September 2019 Round 5	NA Hussein Dey	4–3	ES Sétif	Bologhine (Note: NA Hussein Dey played their home match against ES Sétif at Omar Hamadi Stadium, Bologhine, instead of their regular stadium Stade 20 Août 1955, Belouizdad, due to renovation.)
17:00	Zerdoum 4', 20', 65'; Boutmene 18'	Soccerway report	Souibaâh 46', 53'; Laribi 48'	Stadium: Omar Hamadi Stadium; Referee: Bilal Bendjahene

28 September 2019 Round 6	CS Constantine	1–0	NA Hussein Dey	Constantine
17:45	Abid 80'	Soccerway report		Stadium: Stade Mohamed Hamlaoui; Referee: Said Aouina

6 October 2019 Round 7	NA Hussein Dey	1–1	AS Aïn M'lila	Dar El Beïda (Note: NA Hussein Dey played their home match against AS Aïn M'lila at Omar Benrabah Stadium, Dar El Beïda, instead of their regular stadium Stade 20 Août 1955, Belouizdad, due to renovation.)
16:00	Boultif 0' (o.g.)	Soccerway report	Tiaiba 60' (pen.)	Stadium: Omar Benrabah Stadium; Referee: Ahmed Bouzrar

23 October 2019 Round 8	MC Alger	3–0	NA Hussein Dey	Algiers
17:00	Derrardja 48' (pen.); Bendebka 54'; Benaldjia 85'	Soccerway report		Stadium: July 5, 1962 Stadium; Referee: Youcef Gamouh

30 October 2019 Round 9	NA Hussein Dey	1–0	JS Saoura	Dar El Beïda
15:00	Belaïd 48'	Soccerway report		Stadium: Omar Benrabah Stadium; Referee: Mehdi Abid Charef

9 November 2019 Round 10	USM Alger	0–0	NA Hussein Dey	Bologhine
17:45		Soccerway report		Stadium: Omar Hamadi Stadium; Referee: Abdelali Ibrir

24 November 2019 Round 11	NA Hussein Dey	0–0	MC Oran	Belouizdad
15:00		Soccerway report		Stadium: Stade 20 Août 1955; Referee: Houssam Benyahia

30 November 2019 Round 12	CA Bordj Bou Arreridj	1–0	NA Hussein Dey	Bordj Bou Arréridj
15:00	Djahnit 84'	Soccerway report		Stadium: August 20, 1955 Stadium; Referee: Mustapha Bessiri

7 December 2019 Round 13	NA Hussein Dey	0–1	NC Magra	Dar El Beïda
15:00		Soccerway report	Ziani 48'	Stadium: Omar Benrabah Stadium; Referee: Missoum Benabdellah

16 December 2019 Round 14	NA Hussein Dey	1–3	Paradou AC	Belouizdad
15:00	Mouaki Dadi 37'	Soccerway report	Bouzok 20' (pen.); Zorgane 52' (pen.); Kadri 62'	Stadium: Stade 20 Août 1955; Referee: Farouk Mial

21 December 2019 Round 15	US Biskra	2–3	NA Hussein Dey	Biskra
16:00	Hamzaoui 3'; Guebli 62'	Soccerway report	Lakhdari 23' (o.g.); Haroun 40'; Khacef 83'	Stadium: Stade du 18 Février; Referee: Lahlou Benbraham

5 February 2020 Round 16	JS Kabylie	1–0	NA Hussein Dey	Tizi Ouzou
18:45	Belaïd 38' (o.g.)	Soccerway report		Stadium: Stade 1er Novembre 1954; Referee: Houssam Benyahia

8 February 2020 Round 17	NA Hussein Dey	0–3	ASO Chlef	Belouizdad
15:00		Soccerway report	Boulaouidet 33'; Bengrina 47'; Hellal 89'	Stadium: Stade 20 Août 1955; Referee: Abdelmoumen Touabti

17 February 2020 Round 18	CR Belouizdad	1–0	NA Hussein Dey	Algiers
18:45	Bousseliou 73'	Soccerway report		Stadium: Stade du 5 Juillet; Referee: Abdelali Ibrir

22 February 2020 Round 19	NA Hussein Dey	1–1	USM Bel Abbès	Belouizdad
16:00	Ferraz 79'	Soccerway report	Haddad 52'	Stadium: Stade 20 Août 1955; Referee: Malek Ait Ameur

29 February 2020 Round 20	ES Sétif	2–0	NA Hussein Dey	Sétif
17:00	Laouafi 55'; Berbache 76'	Soccerway report		Stadium: Stade 8 Mai 1945; Referee: Mohamed Saïdi

7 March 2020 Round 21	NA Hussein Dey	1–0	CS Constantine	Belouizdad
15:00	Azzi 45'	Soccerway report		Stadium: Stade 20 Août 1955; Attendance: 0 (close doors); Referee: Amine Hansal

14 March 2020 Round 22	AS Ain M'lila	1–0	NA Hussein Dey	Aïn M'lila
15:00	Tiaiba 90+5'	Soccerway report		Stadium: Touhami Zoubir Khelifi Stadium; Attendance: 0 (close doors); Referee: Nabil Boukhalfa
Note: due to coronavirus outbreak, Ministry of Health, Population and Hospital Reform decided to be all matches played behind closed doors.

Round 23	NA Hussein Dey	Cancelled	MC Alger	Belouizdad
				Stadium: Stade 20 Août 1955

Round 24	JS Saoura	Cancelled	NA Hussein Dey	Béchar
				Stadium: Stade 20 Août 1955

Round 25	NA Hussein Dey	Cancelled	USM Alger	Belouizdad
				Stadium: Stade 20 Août 1955

Round 26	MC Oran	Cancelled	NA Hussein Dey	Oran
				Stadium: Ahmed Zabana Stadium

Round 27	NA Hussein Dey	Cancelled	CA Bordj Bou Arreridj	Belouizdad
				Stadium: Stade 20 Août 1955

Round 28	NC Magra	Cancelled	NA Hussein Dey	Magra
				Stadium: Boucheligue Brothers Stadium

Round 29	Paradou AC	Cancelled	NA Hussein Dey	Bologhine
				Stadium: Omar Hamadi Stadium

Round 30	NA Hussein Dey	Cancelled	US Biskra	Belouizdad
				Stadium: Stade 20 Août 1955

== Algerian Cup ==
26 December 2019 Round of 64	AB Sabath	1–3	NA Hussein Dey	Guelma
14:30	Labser 83' (pen.)	Report	Ait El Hadi 22'; Aït Ferguene 48'; Boutmene 80'	Stadium: Stade Souidani Boujemaa; Referee: Benatia, Bazel, Seguer
Note: Lineup for NA Hussein Dey - Mokrani, Khadir, Cheraitia, Azzi, Boumaiza, Belaïd, Ait El Hadi, Khacef (Zerdoum 77’), Mouaki Dadi (Boutmene 78’), Aït Ferguene (Nacef 74’), Haroun

5 January 2020 Round of 32	RC Arbaâ	1–0 (a.e.t.)	NA Hussein Dey	Larbaâ
14:00	Boughalia 103' (pen.)	Report		Stadium: Ismaïl Makhlouf Stadium; Referee: Youcef Gamouh
Note: Lineup for NA Hussein Dey - Benchlef, Khadir, Belaïd, Cheraitia, Azzi, Ait El Hadi, Mouaki Dadi (Habchi 111’), Boutmene (Benrabah 86’), Doucene (Nacef 70’), Khacef, Haroun

== Squad information ==
=== Playing statistics ===
No.	Pos	Nat	Player	Total		Ligue 1		Algerian Cup	
No.	Pos	Nat	Player	Apps	Goals	Apps	Goals	Apps	Goals
Goalkeepers
1	GK	(Algeria) ALG	Imad Benchlef	17	0	16	0	1	0
16	GK	(Algeria) ALG	Mohamed Seddik Mokrani	6	0	5	0	1	0
30	GK	(Algeria) ALG	Chahereddine Chaouche	1	0	1	0	0	0
Defenders
4	DF	(Algeria) ALG	Imadeddine Azzi	16	1	14	1	2	0
15	DF	(Algeria) ALG	Sabri Boumaiza	13	0	12	0	1	0
20	DF	(Algeria) ALG	Sofiane Khadir	11	0	9	0	2	0
24	DF	(Algeria) ALG	Naoufel Khacef	6	1	4	1	2	0
26	DF	(Algeria) ALG	Chamseddine Nerier	7	0	7	0	0	0
27	DF	(Algeria) ALG	Sofiane Baouali	0	0	0	0	0	0
28	DF	(Algeria) ALG	Sabri Cheraitia	16	0	14	0	2	0
52	DF	(Algeria) ALG	Zineddine Belaïd	21	1	19	1	2	0
Midfielders
6	MF	(Algeria) ALG	Laid Ouaji	20	0	20	0	0	0
8	MF	(Algeria) ALG	Lyes Doucene	8	0	7	0	1	0
10	MF	(Algeria) ALG	Faouzi Yaya	12	0	12	0	0	0
13	MF	(Algeria) ALG	Nabil Bousmaha	12	0	12	0	0	0
14	MF	(Mauritania) MTN	Mohamed Dellahi Yali	3	0	3	0	0	0
21	MF	(Algeria) ALG	Mohamed Ali Chihati	7	0	7	0	0	0
22	MF	(Algeria) ALG	Nabil Aït Ferguene	21	1	20	0	1	1
23	MF	(Algeria) ALG	Mounir Ait El Hadi	18	1	16	0	2	1
58	MF	(Algeria) ALG	Abdellah Nacef	5	0	3	0	2	0
	MF	(Algeria) ALG	Ilyes Sidhoum	6	0	6	0	0	0
Forwards
9	FW	(Algeria) ALG	Ali Haroun	8	1	6	1	2	0
17	FW	(Algeria) ALG	Mohammed Zakaria Habchi	14	0	13	0	1	0
29	FW	(Algeria) ALG	Mohamed Amine Djermouni	2	0	2	0	0	0
53	FW	(Algeria) ALG	Nadjib Benrabah	8	0	7	0	1	0
99	FW	(Algeria) ALG	Zinedine Boutmène	20	2	18	1	2	1
	FW	(Algeria) ALG	Abdelaziz Moulay	5	0	5	0	0	0
19	FW	(Libya) LBA	Mouayed Gritli	4	0	4	0	0	0
25	FW	(Algeria) ALG	Kamel Ferraz	7	1	7	1	0	0
Players transferred out during the season
47	DF	(Algeria) ALG	Mohamed Amine Tougai	4	0	4	0	0	0
32	MF	(Algeria) ALG	Redouane Zerdoum	12	5	11	5	1	0
7	MF	(Algeria) ALG	El Hocine Mouaki Dadi	13	1	11	1	2	0
11	FW	(Algeria) ALG	Ilyes Yaiche	11	0	11	0	0	0

Last updated: 11 June 2018
Source: fr.soccerway.com

=== Goalscorers ===
Includes all competitive matches. The list is sorted alphabetically by surname when total goals are equal.

No.	Nat.	Player	Pos.	L 1	AC	TOTAL
32	(Algeria)	Redouane Zerdoum	MF	5	0	5
99	(Algeria)	Zinedine Boutmène	FW	1	1	2
52	(Algeria)	Zineddine Belaïd	DF	1	0	1
4	(Algeria)	Imadeddine Azzi	DF	1	0	1
25	(Algeria)	Kamel Ferraz	FW	1	0	1
7	(Algeria)	El Hocine Mouaki Dadi	MF	1	0	1
9	(Algeria)	Ali Haroun	FW	1	0	1
24	(Algeria)	Naoufel Khacef	DF	1	0	1
22	(Algeria)	Nabil Aït Ferguene	MF	0	1	1
23	(Algeria)	Mounir Ait El Hadi	MF	0	1	1
Own Goals				2	0	2
Totals				14	3	17

== Squad list ==
As of 15 August 2019. Note: Flags indicate national team as defined under FIFA eligibility rules; some limited exceptions apply. Players may hold more than one non-FIFA nationality.

No.	Pos.	Nation	Player
1	GK	ALG	Imad Benchlef
3	DF	ALG	Billel Amrani
5	DF	ALG	El Hosseyn Zatout
4	DF	ALG	Imadeddine Azzi
6	MF	ALG	Laid Ouaji
7	FW	ALG	El Hocine Mouaki Dadi
8	FW	ALG	Lyes Doucene
9	FW	ALG	Ali Haroun
10	MF	ALG	Faouzi Yaya
11	FW	ALG	Ilyes Yaiche (on loan from USM Alger)
13	MF	ALG	Nabil Bousmaha
14	MF	MTN	Mohamed Dellahi Yali
15	DF	ALG	Sabri Boumaiza
16	GK	ALG	Mohamed Seddik Mokrani (captain)

No.	Pos.	Nation	Player
17	FW	ALG	Mohamed Zakaria Habchi
19	FW	ALG	Abderrahmane Yousfi
20	DF	ALG	Sofiane Khadir
21	MF	ALG	Mohamed Ali Chihati
22	MF	ALG	Nabil Aït Ferguene
23	MF	ALG	Mounir Ait El Hadi
24	DF	ALG	Naoufel Khacef
25	DF	ALG	Kamel Ferraz
26	DF	ALG	Chamseddine Nerier
27	DF	ALG	Sofiane Baouali
28	DF	ALG	Sabri Cheraitia (on loan from Paradou AC)
29	FW	ALG	Mohamed Amine Djermouni
30	GK	ALG	Chahereddine Chaouche
47	DF	ALG	Mohamed Amine Tougai (vice-captain)

== Transfers ==
=== In ===
Date	Pos	Player	from club	Transfer fee	Source
25 July 2019	DF	(Algeria) Sofiane Khadir	CS Constantine	Free transfer	
25 July 2019	MF	(Algeria) Mohamed Ali Chihati	DRB Tadjenanet	Free transfer	
25 July 2019	MF	(Algeria) Nabil Aït Ferguene	USM Bel Abbes	Free transfer	
25 July 2019	MF	(Algeria) Sabri Boumaiza	USM Annaba	Free transfer	
25 July 2019	FW	(Algeria) Mohamed Zakaria Habchi	USM Blida	Free transfer	
1 August 2019	MF	(Mauritania) Mohamed Dellahi Yali	DRB Tadjenanet	Free transfer	
13 January 2020	FW	(Algeria) Abdelaziz Moulay	(Tunisia) US Tataouine	Free transfer	
18 January 2020	FW	(Libya) Mouayed Gritli	(Libya) Al-Ittihad	Free transfer	

=== Out ===
Date	Pos	Player	To club	Transfer fee	Source
2 June 2019	DF	(Algeria) Walid Allati	MC Alger	Free transfer	
9 June 2019	DF	(Algeria) Belkacem Brahimi	MC Alger	Free transfer	
20 June 2019	DF	(Algeria) Abdelghani Khiat	ES Sétif	Free transfer	
22 June 2019	CB	(Algeria) Lyes Oukkal	USM Alger	Free transfer	
28 June 2019	GK	(Algeria) Kheireddine Boussouf	(Saudi Arabia) Al-Tai FC	Free transfer	
4 July 2019	FW	(Algeria) Ahmed Gasmi	CR Belouizdad	Free transfer	
10 July 2019	MF	(Algeria) Hocine Laribi	ES Sétif	Free transfer	
19 July 2019	GK	(Algeria) Gaya Merbah	CR Belouizdad	Undisclosed	
19 July 2019	MF	(Algeria) Chamseddine Harrag	MC Alger	Free transfer	
19 July 2019	MF	(Tunisia) Mehdi Ouertani	MC Alger	Free transfer	
25 July 2019	FW	(Algeria) Raouf Chouiter	MC Oran	Free transfer	
7 August 2019	MF	(Algeria) Hocine El Orfi	NC Magra	Free transfer	
28 December 2019	DF	(Algeria) Mohamed Amine Tougai	(Tunisia) Espérance de Tunis	200,000 €	
18 January 2020	MF	(Algeria) Redouane Zerdoum	(Tunisia) Étoile du Sahel	450,000 €	
20 January 2020	FW	(Algeria) El Hocine Mouaki Dadi	(Tunisia) Étoile du Sahel (Note: Mouaki Dadi joined Étoile du Sahel on 27 January 2020.)	Free transfer (Released)	
31 January 2020	DF	(Algeria) Naoufel Khacef	(France) Girondins de Bordeaux	Loan for six months	
