= 2020–21 MC Alger season =

MC Alger
2020–21 season
- Owner: Sonatrach
- President: Abdenacer Almas (until 20 April 2021); Amar Brahmia (from 20 April 2021)
- Head coach: Nabil Neghiz (until 4 February 2021); Abdelkader Amrani (from 7 February 2021) (until 12 April 2021); Nabil Neghiz (from 23 April 2021) (until 12 August 2021)
- Stadium: Stade du 5 Juillet
- Ligue 1: 7th
- League Cup: Round of 16
- Champions League: Quarter-finals
- Top goalscorer: League: Samy Frioui (11 goals); All: Samy Frioui (14 goals)
- Highest home attendance: 0 (Note: no one can attend games due to the COVID-19 pandemic)
- Lowest home attendance: 0 (Note: no one can attend games due to the COVID-19 pandemic)
- Average home league attendance: 0 (Note: no one can attend games due to the COVID-19 pandemic)
Home colours	Away colours	Third colours

In the 2020–21 season, MC Alger is competing in the Ligue 1 for the 52nd season, as well as the Algerian Cup. It is their 18th consecutive season in the top flight of Algerian football. They will be competing in Ligue 1 and the Champions League.

== Squad list ==
Players and squad numbers last updated on 15 November 2020.
Note: Flags indicate national team as has been defined under FIFA eligibility rules. Players may hold more than one non-FIFA nationality.

No.	Nat.	Position	Name	Date of birth (age)	Signed from
Goalkeepers
1	(Algeria)	GK	Farid Chaâl	3 July 1994 (aged 26)	(Algeria) Youth system
2	(Algeria)	GK	Abdelkader Salhi	19 March 1993 (aged 27)	(Algeria) Unattached
16	(Algeria)	GK	Ahmed Boutagga	18 December 1997 (aged 23)	(Algeria) USM Blida
Defenders
5	(Algeria)	CB	Nabil Saâdou	7 March 1990 (aged 30)	(Algeria) JS Kabylie
6	(Algeria)	RB	Miloud Rebiai	12 December 1993 (aged 27)	(Algeria) ES Sétif
12	(Algeria)		Mohamed Merouani	29 August 1997 (aged 23)	(Algeria) ASO Chlef
13	(Algeria)	LB	Belkacem Brahimi	20 January 1994 (aged 26)	(Algeria) NA Hussein Dey
15	(Algeria)	LB	Nabil Lamara	15 August 1993 (aged 27)	(Algeria) USM Bel Abbès
17	(Algeria)	CB	Mouad Hadded	22 February 1997 (aged 23)	(Algeria) JSM Skikda
20	(Algeria)	RB	Walid Alati	1 August 1991 (aged 29)	(Algeria) NA Hussein Dey
27	(Algeria)	RB	Abderahmane Hachoud	2 July 1988 (aged 32)	(Algeria) ES Setif
Midfielders
7	(Algeria)	DM	Chamseddine Harrag	1 August 1992 (aged 28)	(Algeria) NA Hussein Dey
8	(Algeria)	AM	Abderrahmane Bourdim	14 June 1994 (aged 26)	(Algeria) JS Saoura
10	(Algeria)	RW	Abdelmoumene Djabou	31 January 1987 (aged 33)	(Algeria) ES Sétif
18	(Algeria)	CM	Toufik Addadi	7 October 1990 (aged 30)	(Algeria) JS Kabylie
22	(Ivory Coast)	DM	Isla Daoudi Diomande	28 April 1998 (aged 22)	(Algeria) CA Bordj Bou Arreridj
24	(Algeria)	AM	Abdellah El Moudene	11 February 1994 (aged 26)	(Algeria) Paradou AC
Forwards
9	(Algeria)	ST	Abdelhak Abdelhafid	14 December 1991 (aged 29)	(Algeria) MC Oran
14	(Algeria)	LW	Mehdi Benaldjia	14 May 1991 (aged 29)	(Algeria) JS Kabylie
19	(Algeria)		Sofiane Abdellaoui	20 March 1999 (aged 21)	(Algeria) Youth system
21	(Algeria)	RW	Abdenour Belkheir	21 February 1989 (aged 31)	(Algeria) CS Constantine
23	(Algeria)	ST	Samy Frioui	7 September 1991 (aged 29)	(Greece) Larissa
25	(Algeria)	LW	Billel Bensaha	18 February 1994 (aged 26)	(Tunisia) ES Tunis
26	(Algeria)	LW	Badreddine Dahlal	1 September 1999 (aged 21)	(Algeria) Youth system

== Pre-season ==
5 November 2020 Tournoi Smaïl Khabatou	Paradou AC	1–2	MC Alger	Hydra
12:30			Abdelhafid; Frioui (pen.)	Stadium: Stade Ahmed Falek

7 November 2020 Tournoi Smaïl Khabatou	MC Alger	1–0	NA Hussein Dey	Hydra
15:45				Stadium: Stade Ahmed Falek

== Competitions ==
=== Overview ===
Competition	Record								Started round	Final position / round	First match	Last match
Competition	G	W	D	L	GF	GA	GD	Win %	Started round	Final position / round	First match	Last match
Ligue 1	0	0	0	0	0	0	+0	—	—N/a	To be confirmed	8 December 2020	In Progress
League Cup	1	0	0	1	0	2	−2	0.00	Round of 16		8 May 2021	
Champions League	12	4	5	3	13	9	+4	33.33	Preliminary round	Quarter-finals	28 November 2020	22 May 2021
Total	0	0	0	0	0	0	+0	—				

Updated to match played 7 March 2020
Source: Competitions

== League table ==
Pos	Team	Pld	W	D	L	GF	GA	GD	Pts	Qualification or relegation
5	JS Kabylie	38	17	10	11	44	33	+11	61	Qualification for Confederation Cup
6	MC Oran	38	15	15	8	51	37	+14	60	
7	MC Alger	38	15	12	11	59	43	+16	57	
8	CS Constantine	38	15	12	11	43	31	+12	57	
9	NC Magra	38	14	10	14	38	44	−6	52	

Updated to match(es) played on 28 August 2021. Source: dzfoot.com
Rules for classification: 1) points; 2) head-to-head points; 3) head-to-head goal difference; 4) goal difference; 5) total goals; 6) fairplay ranking; 7) playoff.

=== Results summary ===
Overall								Home						Away					
Pld	W	D	L	GF	GA	GD	Pts	W	D	L	GF	GA	GD	W	D	L	GF	GA	GD
0	0	0	0	0	0	0	0	0	0	0	0	0	0	0	0	0	0	0	0

Last updated: 7 March 2020.
Source: Competitive matches

=== Results by round ===
Round	1	2	3	4	5	6	7	8	9	10	11	12	13	14	15	16	17	18	19	20	21	22	23	24	25	26	27	28	29	30	31	32	33	34	35	36	37	38
Ground																																						
Result	W	W	D	W	W	L	D	W	D	L	D	D	W	L	L	W	D	W	D	W	D	W	L	D	W	L	W	L	W	L	D	D	W	L	W	L	L	D
Position	3	2	2	2	2	3	2	2	2	4	5	6	5	7	7	7	8	6	8	6	7	5	5	6	5	5	5	6	6	7	7	7	6	7	7	7	7	7

Updated to match(es) played on 24 August 2021. Source: Competitive matches
A = Away; H = Home; W = Win; D = Draw; L = Loss

=== Matches ===
On 22 October 2020, the Algerian Ligue Professionnelle 1 fixtures were announced.

8 December 2020 Round 1	USM Bel Abbès	1–2	MC Alger	Sidi Bel Abbès
15:00	Bounoua 65'	Soccerway report	Frioui 15' (pen.), 90+1'	Stadium: Stade 24 Fevrier 1956; Attendance: 0 (close doors); Referee: Farouk Mial

11 December 2020 Round 3	Paradou AC	1–1	MC Alger	Dar El Beïda
15:00	Bouzok 18' (pen.)	Soccerway report	Frioui 90'	Stadium: Omar Benrabah Stadium; Attendance: 0 (close doors); Referee: Mustapha Bessiri

15 December 2020 Round 2	MC Alger	3–0	Olympique de Médéa	Algiers
15:00	Frioui 7'; Bensaha 12'; Abdelhafid 59'	Soccerway report		Stadium: Stade du 5 Juillet; Attendance: 0 (close doors); Referee: Mehdi Abid Charef

23 December 2020 Round 5	RC Relizane	0–1	MC Alger	Relizane
14:30		Soccerway report	Bourdim 52'	Stadium: Stade Tahar Zoughari; Attendance: 0 (close doors); Referee: Yazid Ibrir

1 January 2021 Round 4	MC Alger	1–0	CS Constantine	Algiers
15:00	Brahimi 59'	Soccerway report		Stadium: Stade du 5 Juillet; Attendance: 0 (close doors); Referee: Mohamed Boutaraa

11 January 2021 Round 7	MC Alger	1–1	MC Oran	Algiers
15:00	Lamara 27' (pen.)	Soccerway report	Mesmoudi 69'	Stadium: Stade du 5 Juillet; Attendance: 0 (close doors); Referee: Houssam Benyahia

16 January 2021 Round 8	ES Sétif	0–1	MC Alger	Sétif
14:30		Soccerway report	Lamara 75'	Stadium: Stade 8 Mai 1945; Attendance: 0 (close doors); Referee: Mustapha Ghorbal

22 January 2021 Round 9	MC Alger	3–3	AS Aïn M'lila	Algiers
15:00	Lamara 13' (pen.); Bourdim 70' (pen.); Abdelhafid 84'	Soccerway report	Djabout 3', 9', 16'	Stadium: Stade du 5 Juillet; Attendance: 0 (close doors); Referee: Said Aouina

26 January 2021 Round 10	WA Tlemcen	1–0	MC Alger	Tlemcen
15:00	Zermane 68'	Soccerway report		Stadium: Stade Akid Lotfi; Attendance: 0 (close doors); Referee: Yazid Ibrir

30 January 2021 Round 11	MC Alger	1–1	US Biskra	Algiers
15:00	Diomande 35'	Soccerway report	Boukarroum 88' (pen.)	Stadium: Stade du 5 Juillet; Attendance: 0 (close doors); Referee: Nabil Boukhalfa

3 February 2021 Round 6	JS Saoura	1–0	MC Alger	Béchar
14:30	Messaoudi 3'	Soccerway report		Stadium: Stade 20 Août 1955; Attendance: 0 (close doors); Referee: Ahmed Bouzrar

27 February 2021 Round 15	MC Alger	1–2	JS Kabylie	Algiers
16:00	Frioui 64'	Soccerway report	Boulahia 48'; Ait Abdessalem 80'	Stadium: Stade du 5 Juillet; Attendance: 0 (close doors); Referee: Youcef Gamouh

12 March 2021 Round 17	MC Alger	1–1	CR Belouizdad	Algiers
15:00	Belkheir 47'	Soccerway report	Koukpo 63'	Stadium: Stade du 5 Juillet; Attendance: 0 (close doors); Referee: Mustapha Ghorbal

21 March 2021 Round 19	NA Hussein Dey	0–0	MC Alger	Belouizdad
15:00		Soccerway report		Stadium: Stade 20 Août 1955; Attendance: 0 (close doors); Referee: Ahmed Bouzrar

26 March 2021 Round 12	USM Alger	2–2	MC Alger	Bologhine
20:45	Koudri 4'; Belaïd 55'	Soccerway report	Belkheir 45'; Bouchina 80' (o.g.)	Stadium: Omar Hamadi Stadium; Attendance: 0 (close doors); Referee: Lyés Bekouassa

30 March 2021 Round 13	MC Alger	2–0	ASO Chlef	Algiers
15:00	Frioui 3'; Belkheir 30' (pen.)	Soccerway report		Stadium: Stade du 5 Juillet; Attendance: 0 (close doors); Referee: Abderrezzak Arab

16 April 2021 Round 14	JSM Skikda	1–0	MC Alger	Skikda
16:00	Bahraoui 89'	Soccerway report		Stadium: Stade 20 Août 1955; Attendance: 0 (close doors); Referee: Houssam Benyahia

25 April 2021 Round 16	CA Bordj Bou Arreridj	0–2	MC Alger	Bordj Bou Arréridj
22:30		Soccerway report	Bourdim 68'; Addadi 85'	Stadium: Stade 20 Août 1955; Attendance: 0 (close doors); Referee: Abdelmoumen Touabti

30 April 2021 Round 18	MC Alger	5–1	NC Magra	Algiers
22:30	Bensaha 45+1'; Frioui 59', 69', 78'; Bourdim 67'	Soccerway report	Bourahla 57'	Stadium: Stade du 5 Juillet; Attendance: 0 (close doors); Referee: Nabil Boukhalfa

4 May 2021 Round 20	MC Alger	2–1	USM Bel Abbès	Algiers
22:30	Hadded 11'; Lamara 55' (pen.)	Soccerway report	Metref 88'	Stadium: Stade du 5 Juillet; Attendance: 0 (close doors); Referee: Ahmed Bouzrar

26 May 2021 Round 23	CS Constantine	1–0	MC Alger	Constantine
17:00	Dib 38'	Soccerway report		Stadium: Stade Ramdane Benabdelmalek; Attendance: 0 (close doors); Referee: Abdelali Ibrir

30 May 2021 Round 24	MC Alger	2–2	RC Relizane	Algiers
19:00	Frioui 37'; Hachoud 45+3'	Soccerway report	Seguer 49'; Gharbi 71'	Stadium: Stade du 5 Juillet; Attendance: 0 (close doors); Referee: Abdelmoumen Touabti

8 June 2021 Round 21	Olympique de Médéa	1–1	MC Alger	Médéa
16:00	Dadache 73'	Soccerway report	Frioui 69'	Stadium: Stade Imam Lyes; Attendance: 0 (close doors); Referee: Farouk Mial

13 June 2021 Round 25	MC Alger	1–0	JS Saoura	Algiers
17:45	Hachoud 18'	Soccerway report		Stadium: Stade du 5 Juillet; Attendance: 0 (close doors); Referee: Mehdi Abid Charef

19 June 2021 Round 26	MC Oran	2–1	MC Alger	Oran
17:00	Benamar 38'; Nekkache 84'	Soccerway report	Tahar 83'	Stadium: Ahmed Zabana Stadium; Attendance: 0 (close doors); Referee: Said Aouina

23 June 2021 Round 22	MC Alger	4–0	Paradou AC	Algiers
17:45	Haif 46'; Diomande 49'; Hadded 59'; Brahimi 65'	Soccerway report		Stadium: Stade du 5 Juillet; Attendance: 0 (close doors); Referee: Bilal Bendjahene

28 June 2021 Round 27	MC Alger	3–2	ES Sétif	Algiers
17:45	Lamara 38'; Hachoud 68'; Esso 87'	Soccerway report	Amoura 17', 27'	Stadium: Stade du 5 Juillet; Attendance: 0 (close doors); Referee: Nabil Boukhalfa

1 July 2021 Round 28	AS Ain M'lila	2–0	MC Alger	Aïn M'lila
20:00	Djabout 34' (pen.); Debbih 84'	Soccerway report		Stadium: Touhami Zoubir Khelifi Stadium; Attendance: 0 (close doors); Referee: Mohamed Saïdi

4 July 2021 Round 29	MC Alger	2–1	WA Tlemcen	Algiers
19:00	Saâdou 43'; Hachoud 68'	Soccerway report	Aichi 40'	Stadium: Stade du 5 Juillet; Attendance: 0 (close doors); Referee: Farouk Mial

8 July 2021 Round 30	US Biskra	2–1	MC Alger	Biskra
20:30	Chibane 54'; Toumi 83'	Soccerway report	Lamara 90' (pen.)	Stadium: Stade du 18 Février; Attendance: 0 (close doors); Referee: Mohamed Boutaraa

13 July 2021 Round 31	MC Alger	2–2	USM Alger	Algiers
21:00	Abdelhafid 27', 45+4'	Soccerway report	Zouari 49'; Belkacemi 72' (pen.)	Stadium: Stade du 5 Juillet; Attendance: 0 (close doors); Referee: Mustapha Ghorbal

17 July 2021 Round 32	ASO Chlef	1–1	MC Alger	Chlef
20:30	Bouguettaya 11'	Soccerway report	Lamara 39' (pen.)	Stadium: Stade Mohamed Boumezrag; Attendance: 0 (close doors); Referee: Abdelali Ibrir

23 July 2021 Round 33	MC Alger	3–0	JSM Skikda	Algiers
20:30	Belkheir 4'; Lamara 52' (pen.); Esso 60'	Soccerway report		Stadium: Stade du 5 Juillet; Attendance: 0 (close doors); Referee: Hamza Maatouk

27 July 2021 Round 34	JS Kabylie	2–1	MC Alger	Tizi Ouzou
21:00	Hamroune 41', 48'	Soccerway report	Abdelhafid 24'	Stadium: Stade 1er Novembre 1954; Attendance: 0 (close doors); Referee: Mehdi Abid Charef

9 August 2021 Round 35	MC Alger	3–0	CA Bordj Bou Arreridj	Dar El Beïda
17:30	Esso 2'; Abdelhafid 51', 54'	Soccerway report		Stadium: Omar Benrabah Stadium; Attendance: 0 (close doors); Referee: Abdenacer Baatouche

16 August 2021 Round 36	CR Belouizdad	2–0	MC Alger	Belouizdad
17:30	Keddad 7'; Khalfallah 13'	Soccerway report		Stadium: Stade 20 Août 1955; Attendance: 0 (close doors); Referee: Lahlou Benbraham

21 August 2021 Round 37	NC Magra	2–1	MC Alger	Magra
17:30	Demane 25'; Korichi 60' (pen.)	Soccerway report	Esso 37'	Stadium: Boucheligue Brothers Stadium; Attendance: 0 (close doors); Referee: Benzohra

24 August 2021 Round 38	MC Alger	4–4	NA Hussein Dey	Bologhine
17:30	Bouzekri 3'; Esso 6', 21' (pen.), 71'	Soccerway report	Boussalem 1'; Yaya 40', 45'; Betrouni 69'	Stadium: Omar Hamadi Stadium; Attendance: 0 (close doors); Referee: Nadjib Meziani

== Algerian League Cup ==
8 May 2021 Round of 16	USM Alger	2–0	MC Alger	Bologhine
22:30	Opoku 19'; Naidji 90+2'	Report		Stadium: Omar Hamadi Stadium; Attendance: 0 (close doors); Referee: Lyés Bekouassa
Note: Lineup for MC Alger - Chaâl, Hachoud (Merouani, 25'), Lamara, Hadded (Isla, 66'), Rebiai, Addadi, Harrag, Bourdim, Bensaha, Belkheir, Esso.

== Champions League ==
=== Preliminary round ===
28 November 2020 First leg	Buffles du Borgou (Benin)	1–1	(Algeria) MC Alger	Porto-Novo
15:00 UTC+1	Fehintola 71'	Report	Rebiai 25'	Stadium: Stade Charles de Gaulle; Attendance: 0 (close doors); Referee: Patrick Tanguy Vlei (Ivory Coast)

19 December 2020 (Note: The MC Alger v Buffles du Borgou match, originally scheduled to be played on 5 December 2020, was postponed due to unavailability of direct flights from Benin to Algeria, which prevented Buffles du Borgou from appearing for the match in time. The match was later rescheduled to be played on 19 December 2020.) Second leg	MC Alger (Algeria)	5–1 (6–2 agg.)	(Benin) Buffles du Borgou	Algiers
20:45 UTC+1	Djabou 6'; Abdelhafid 14', 72'; Frioui 82'; Bourdim 90+4'	Report	Ajayi 19'	Stadium: Stade du 5 Juillet; Attendance: 0 (close doors); Referee: Mohamed Adel (Egypt)

=== First round ===
28 December 2020 (Note: The MC Alger v CS Sfaxien match, originally scheduled to be played on 22 or 23 December 2020, was rescheduled to be played on 28 December following the postponement of the preliminary round second leg match between MC Alger and Buffles du Borgou from 5 to 19 December 2020.) First leg	MC Alger (Algeria)	2–0	(Tunisia) CS Sfaxien	Algiers
20:45 UTC+1	Frioui 28', 34'	Report		Stadium: Stade du 5 Juillet; Attendance: 0 (close doors); Referee: Samir Guezzaz (Morocco)

6 January 2021 Second leg	CS Sfaxien (Tunisia)	1–0 (1–2 agg.)	(Algeria) MC Alger	Sfax
16:00 UTC+1	Chaouat 45+3' (pen.)	Report		Stadium: Stade Taïeb Mhiri; Attendance: 0 (close doors); Referee: Bakary Gassama (Gambia)

=== Group stage ===
==== Group D ====
Pos	Team	Pld	W	D	L	GF	GA	GD	Pts	Qualification	EST	MCA	ZAM	TEU
1	(Tunisia) Espérance de Tunis	6	3	2	1	9	6	+3	11	Advance to knockout stage	—	1–1	3–1	2–1
2	(Algeria) MC Alger	6	2	3	1	4	4	0	9	Advance to knockout stage	1–1	—	0–2	1–0
3	(Egypt) Zamalek	6	2	2	2	7	5	+2	8		0–1	0–0	—	4–1
4	(Senegal) Teungueth	6	1	1	4	4	9	−5	4		2–1	0–1	0–0	—

Source: Soccerway

12 February 2021 1	Zamalek (Egypt)	0–0	(Algeria) MC Alger	Cairo
19:00 (21:00 UTC+2)		Report		Stadium: Cairo International Stadium; Attendance: 0 (close doors); Referee: Bamlak Tessema Weyesa (Ethiopia)

23 February 2021 2	MC Alger (Algeria)	1–1	(Tunisia) Espérance de Tunis	Algiers
19:00 (20:00 UTC+1)	Bensaha 27'	Report	Benguit 60'	Stadium: Stade du 5 Juillet; Attendance: 0 (close doors); Referee: Rédouane Jiyed (Morocco)

6 March 20021 3	Teungueth (Senegal)	0–1	(Algeria) MC Alger	Thiès
16:00 (16:00 UTC+0)		Report	Belkheir 14'	Stadium: Stade Lat-Dior; Attendance: 0 (close doors); Referee: Beida Damane (Mauritania)

16 March 2021 4	MC Alger (Algeria)	1–0	(Senegal) Teungueth	Algiers
19:00 (20:00 UTC+1)	Benaldjia 25'	Report		Stadium: Stade du 5 Juillet; Attendance: 0 (close doors); Referee: Boubou Traoré (Mali)

3 April 2021 5	MC Alger (Algeria)	0–2	(Egypt) Zamalek	Algiers
20:00 UTC+1		Report	Obama 7'; Shikabala 33'	Stadium: Stade du 5 Juillet; Attendance: 0 (close doors); Referee: Noureddine El Jaafari (Morocco)

10 April 2021 6	Espérance de Tunis (Tunisia)	1–1	(Algeria) MC Alger	Rades
16:00 (17:00 UTC+1)	Ben Khalifa 31'	Report	Belkheir 68'	Stadium: Stade Hammadi Agrebi; Attendance: 0 (close doors); Referee: Victor Gomes (South Africa)

=== knockout stage ===
==== Quarter-finals ====
14 May 2021 First leg	MC Alger (Algeria)	1–1	(Morocco) Wydad AC	Algiers
19:00 (20:00 UTC+1)	Rebiaï 83'	Report	Jabrane 66' (pen.)	Stadium: Stade du 5 Juillet; Attendance: 0 (close doors); Referee: Bamlak Tessema Weyesa (Ethiopia)

22 May 2021 Second leg	Wydad AC (Morocco)	1–0	(Algeria) MC Alger	Casablanca
16:00 (17:00 UTC+1)	El Karti 90+2'	Report		Stadium: Stade Mohammed V Attendance: 0 (close doors); Referee: Joshua Bondo (Botswana)

== Squad information ==
=== Playing statistics ===
No.	Pos	Nat	Player	Total		Ligue 1		League Cup		Champions League	
No.	Pos	Nat	Player	Apps	Goals	Apps	Goals	Apps	Goals	Apps	Goals
1	GK	(Algeria) ALG	Farid Chaâl	3	0	0	0	0	0	3	0
2	GK	(Algeria) ALG	Abdelkader Salhi	4	0	0	0	0	0	4	0
16	GK	(Algeria) ALG	Ahmed Boutagga	5	0	0	0	0	0	5	0
5	DF	(Algeria) ALG	Nabil Saâdou	6	0	0	0	0	0	6	0
6	DF	(Algeria) ALG	Miloud Rebiai	10	2	0	0	0	0	10	2
13	DF	(Algeria) ALG	Belkacem Brahimi	8	0	0	0	0	0	8	0
15	DF	(Algeria) ALG	Nabil Lamara	6	0	0	0	0	0	6	0
17	DF	(Algeria) ALG	Mouad Hadded	11	0	0	0	0	0	11	0
20	DF	(Algeria) ALG	Walid Alati	6	0	0	0	0	0	6	0
27	DF	(Algeria) ALG	Abderahmane Hachoud	11	0	0	0	0	0	11	0
7	MF	(Algeria) ALG	Chamseddine Harrag	9	0	0	0	0	0	9	0
8	MF	(Algeria) ALG	Abderrahmane Bourdim	10	1	0	0	0	0	10	1
12	MF	(Algeria) ALG	Mohamed Merouani	7	0	0	0	0	0	7	0
14	MF	(Algeria) ALG	Mehdi Benaldjia	8	1	0	0	0	0	8	1
18	MF	(Algeria) ALG	Toufik Addadi	10	0	0	0	0	0	10	0
22	MF	(Ivory Coast) CIV	Isla Daoudi Diomande	11	0	0	0	0	0	11	0
9	FW	(Algeria) ALG	Abdelhak Abdelhafid	8	2	0	0	0	0	8	2
19	FW	(Algeria) ALG	Sofiane Abdellaoui	2	0	0	0	0	0	2	0
21	FW	(Algeria) ALG	Abdenour Belkheir	12	2	0	0	0	0	12	2
23	FW	(Algeria) ALG	Samy Frioui	10	3	0	0	0	0	10	3
25	FW	(Algeria) ALG	Billel Bensaha	11	1	0	0	0	0	11	1
26	FW	(Algeria) ALG	Badreddine Dahlal	2	0	0	0	0	0	2	0
74	FW	(Algeria) ALG	Aymen Rahmani	1	0	0	0	0	0	1	0
Players transferred out during the season
24	MF	(Algeria) ALG	Abdellah El Moudene	4	0	3	0	0	0	1	0
10	MF	(Algeria) ALG	Abdelmoumene Djabou	8	1	6	0	0	0	2	1

Last updated: 1 June 2020
Source: fr.soccerway.com

=== Goalscorers ===
Includes all competitive matches. The list is sorted alphabetically by surname when total goals are equal.

No.	Nat.	Player	Pos.	L 1	LC	CL 1	TOTAL
23	(Algeria)	Samy Frioui	FW	4	0	3	7
9	(Algeria)	Abdelhak Abdelhafid	FW	2	0	2	4
15	(Algeria)	Nabil Lamara	DF	3	0	0	3
8	(Algeria)	Abderrahmane Bourdim	MF	2	0	1	3
25	(Algeria)	Billel Bensaha	FW	1	0	0	1
6	(Algeria)	Miloud Rebiai	DF	0	0	1	1
10	(Algeria)	Abdelmoumene Djabou	MF	0	0	1	1
13	(Algeria)	Belkacem Brahimi	DF	1	0	0	1
Own Goals				0	0	0	0
Totals				13	0	8	21

== Transfers ==
=== In ===
Date	Pos	Player	From club	Transfer fee	Source
6 August 2020	DF	(Algeria) Mouad Hadded	JSM Skikda	Free transfer	
13 August 2020	MF	(Ivory Coast) Isla Daoudi Diomande	CA Bordj Bou Arreridj	Free transfer	
8 September 2020	GK	(Algeria) Abdelkader Salhi	Unattached	Free transfer	
16 September 2020	FW	(Algeria) Abdelhak Abdelhafid	MC Oran	Free transfer	
24 September 2020	DF	(Algeria) Nabil Saâdou	JS Kabylie	Free transfer	
29 September 2020	MF	(Algeria) Toufik Addadi	JS Kabylie	Free transfer	
22 October 2020	LW	(Algeria) Billel Bensaha	(Tunisia) Espérance de Tunis	Loan for one year	
30 March 2021	FW	(Ghana) Joseph Esso	(Ghana) Dreams FC	180,000 €	
11 April 2021	FW	(Algeria) Féthi Tahar	ASO Chlef	Free transfer	

=== Out ===
Date	Pos	Player	To club	Transfer fee	Source
1 September 2020	FW	(Algeria) Hichem Nekkache	MC Oran	Free transfer	
1 September 2020	GK	(Algeria) Abdelatif Ramdane	JS Kabylie	Free transfer	
6 September 2020	FW	(Algeria) Walid Derrardja	MC Oran	Free transfer	
7 October 2020	DF	(Algeria) Zidane Mebarakou	CS Constantine	Free transfer	
26 October 2020	DF	(Algeria) Abdelhak Saïla	USM Bel Abbès	Loan for one year	
26 October 2020	MF	(Tunisia) Mehdi Ouertani	USM Bel Abbès	Free transfer	
1 February 2021	MF	(Algeria) Abdellah El Moudene	(Morocco) Mouloudia Oujda	Free transfer (Released)	
15 February 2021	MF	(Algeria) Abdelmoumene Djabou	Unattached (Note: Djabou joined ES Sétif on 8 April 2021.)	Free transfer (Released)	

== New contracts ==
No.	Pos	Player	Contract length	Contract end	Date	Source
27	RB	(Algeria) Abderahmane Hachoud	2 years	2022	8 September 2020	
8	AM	(Algeria) Abderrahmane Bourdim	2 years	2022	13 September 2020	
