= List of Algerian football transfers summer 2017 =

This is a list of Algerian football transfers in the 2017 summer transfer window by club. Clubs in the 2017–18 Algerian Ligue Professionnelle 1 are included.

== Ligue Professionnelle 1 ==
=== CR Belouizdad ===
In:

No.	Pos.	Nation	Player
—	DF	ALG	Ahmida Zenasni (from (Algeria) USM Bel-Abbès)
—	MF	ALG	Yahia Labani (from (Algeria) USM Bel-Abbès)
—	DF	ALG	Walid Bouraoui (from (Spain) Torrevieja)
—	MF	ALG	Housseyn Selmi (from (Algeria) CA Batna)
—	MF	ALG	Marwane Benarma (from (France) Villefranche)
—	DF	ALG	Sofiane Bouchar (from (Algeria) ES Sétif)
—	GK	ALG	Sofiane Kacem (from (Algeria) JSM Bejaia)
—	MF	ALG	Said Sayah (from (Algeria) JS Saoura)
—	MF	ALG	Abdelhak Sameur (from (Algeria) CS Constantine)

Out:

No.	Pos.	Nation	Player
—	MF	ALG	Bouazza Feham (to (Saudi Arabia) Al-Wehda)
—	DF	ALG	Tarek Cheurfaoui (to (Algeria) NA Hussein Dey)
—	FW	ALG	Sid Ali Yahia-Chérif (to (Algeria) JS Saoura)

=== CS Constantine ===
In:

No.	Pos.	Nation	Player
—	GK	ALG	Chamseddine Rahmani (from (Algeria) MO Béjaïa)
—	FW	ALG	Lamine Abid (from (Algeria) NA Hussein Dey)
—	DF	BFA	Ousmane Sylla (from (Burkina Faso) Rail Club du Kadiogo)
—	DF	ALG	Said Arroussi (from (Algeria) ES Sétif)
—	MF	ALG	Sid Ali Lamri (from (Algeria) ES Sétif)
—	DF	ALG	Sofiane Khadir (from (Algeria) MO Béjaïa)
—	FW	MLI	Moctar Cissé (from (Albania) KF Tirana)

Out:

No.	Pos.	Nation	Player
—	GK	ALG	Cédric Si Mohamed (to (Algeria) US Biskra)
—	MF	ALG	Abdelhak Sameur (to (Algeria) CR Belouizdad)

=== DRB Tadjenanet ===
In:

No.	Pos.	Nation	Player

Out:

No.	Pos.	Nation	Player

=== ES Sétif ===
In:

No.	Pos.	Nation	Player
—	MF	ALG	Ilyes Sidhoum (from (Algeria) USM Bel-Abbès)
—	FW	ALG	Youcef Chibane (from (Algeria) DRB Tadjenanet)
—	DF	ALG	Chemseddine Nessakh (from (Algeria) MC Oran)
—	GK	ALG	Moustapha Zeghba (from (Algeria) USM El Harrach)
—	MF	ALG	Samir Aiboud (from (Algeria) JS Kabylie)
—	DF	GAB	Franck Obambou (from (Gabon) AS Stade Mandji)
—	FW	ALG	Mourad Benayad (from (Algeria) RC Relizane)
—	FW	ALG	Ali Bounadir (from (Algeria) ?)

Out:

No.	Pos.	Nation	Player
5	MF	CMR	Azongha Tembeng Abenego (loan return to (Algeria) MC El Eulma)
—	DF	ALG	Sofiane Boutebba (to (Algeria) NA Hussein Dey)
—	GK	ALG	Abderraouf Belhani (to (Algeria) JSM Bejaia)
—	DF	ALG	Sofiane Bouchar (to (Algeria) CR Belouizdad)
—	MF	MAD	Ibrahim Amada (to (Algeria) MC Alger)

=== JS Kabylie ===
In:

No.	Pos.	Nation	Player
—	DF	ALG	Nabil Saâdou (from (Algeria) Olympique de Médéa)
—	DF	ALG	Ilyes Chetti (from (Algeria) US Chaouia)
—	MF	ALG	Salim Boukhenchouche (from (Algeria) Olympique de Médéa)
—	FW	ALG	Adil Djabout (from (Algeria) US Biskra)
—	DF	ALG	Anis Haroun (from (Algeria) US Beni Douala)
—	DF	ALG	Fayçal Abdat (from (Algeria) USM El Harrach)
—	FW	ALG	Nazim Si Salem (from (Algeria) Olympique de Médéa)
—	FW	CMR	Steve Ekedi (from (Portugal) Desportivo das Aves)

Out:

No.	Pos.	Nation	Player
—	DF	ALG	Touhami Sebie (to (Algeria) CA Bordj Bou Arreridj)
—	MF	ALG	Samir Aiboud (to (Algeria) ES Sétif)
—	DF	ALG	Mohamed Boulaouidet (to (Algeria) NA Hussein Dey)
—	DF	ALG	Sofiane Khelili (to (Algeria) USM El Harrach)
—	MF	ALG	Lamine Medjkane (to (Algeria) JSM Skikda)
—	MF	ALG	Karim Baïteche (to (Algeria) USM El Harrach)

=== JS Saoura ===
In:

No.	Pos.	Nation	Player

Out:

No.	Pos.	Nation	Player

=== MC Alger ===
In:

No.	Pos.	Nation	Player
—	MF	ALG	Abou Sofiane Balegh (from (Algeria) USM Bel-Abbès)
—	DF	ALG	Zine El Abidine Boulekhoua (from (Algeria) USM El Harrach)
—	MF	ALG	Zakaria Mansouri (on loan from (Algeria) Paradou AC)
—	MF	ALG	Abdellah El Mouden (on loan from (Algeria) Paradou AC)
—	MF	ALG	Sofiane Bendebka (from (Algeria) NA Hussein Dey)
—	FW	NGA	Barnabas Imenger (from (Nigeria) Kano Pillars FC)
—	MF	MAD	Ibrahim Amada (from (Algeria) ES Sétif)

Out:

No.	Pos.	Nation	Player
—	GK	ALG	Kheireddine Boussouf (to (Algeria) NA Hussein Dey)
—	MF	ALG	Oussama Chita (to (Algeria) USM Alger)
—	MF	ALG	Mehdi Kacem (to (Algeria) ?)
—	MF	ALG	Abdelmalek Mokdad (to (Algeria) ?)
—	FW	ALG	Zahir Zerdab (to (Algeria) ?)
—	FW	ALG	Hadj Bouguèche (to (Algeria) USM El Harrach)
—	MF	ALG	Elyes Seddiki (to (Algeria) ?)

=== MC Oran ===
In:

No.	Pos.	Nation	Player
—	DF	ALG	Zineddine Mekkaoui (from (Algeria) RC Relizane)
—	FW	ALG	Mohamed Tiaïba (from (Qatar) Al-Markhiya)
—	MF	ALG	Amine El Amalli (from (Algeria) USM Bel-Abbès)
—	DF	ALG	Adel Lakhdari (from (Algeria) MO Béjaïa)
—	FW	ALG	Saber Gharbi (from (Algeria) Olympique de Médéa)

Out:

No.	Pos.	Nation	Player
—	MF	ALG	Abdallah Bencheikh (to (Algeria) US Biskra)
—	FW	ALG	Hicham Chérif (to (Algeria) NA Hussein Dey)
—	MF	ALG	Mourad Delhoum (to (Algeria) USM El Harrach)

=== NA Hussein Dey ===
In:

No.	Pos.	Nation	Player
—	MF	ALG	Chamseddine Harrag (from (Algeria) USM El Harrach)
—	DF	ALG	Lyes Okkal (from (Algeria) AS Khroub)
—	MF	ALG	Maher Azzouz (from (Algeria) CA Batna)
—	MF	ALG	Walid Alati (from (Algeria) US Biskra)
—	MF	ALG	Abderaouf Chouiter (from (Algeria) US Beni Douala)
—	DF	ALG	Ibrahim Ferhat (from (Algeria) US Biskra)
—	MF	ALG	Toufik Addadi (from (Algeria) Olympique de Médéa)
—	GK	ALG	Kheireddine Boussouf (from (Algeria) MC Alger)
—	DF	ALG	Sofiane Boutebba (from (Algeria) ES Sétif)
—	DF	ALG	Mohamed Boulaouidet (from (Algeria) JS Kabylie)
—	DF	ALG	Tarek Cheurfaoui (from (Algeria) CR Belouizdad)
—	FW	ALG	Hicham Chérif (from (Algeria) MC Oran)

Out:

No.	Pos.	Nation	Player
—	FW	ALG	Lamine Abid (to (Algeria) CS Constantine)
—	GK	ALG	Azzedine Doukha (to (Saudi Arabia) Ohod Club)
—	DF	ALG	Hamza Zeddam (to (Algeria) USM Blida)
—	MF	ALG	Sofiane Bendebka (to (Algeria) MC Alger)

=== Olympique de Médéa ===
In:

No.	Pos.	Nation	Player

Out:

No.	Pos.	Nation	Player

=== USM Alger ===
In:

No.	Pos.	Nation	Player
7	FW	ALG	Okacha Hamzaoui (on loan from (Portugal) Nacional)
—	MF	ALG	Oualid Ardji (loan return from (Algeria) NA Hussein Dey)
—	MF	ALG	Faouzi Yaya (from (Algeria) MO Béjaïa)
—	DF	ALG	Redouane Cherifi (from (Algeria) USM Bel-Abbès)
—	MF	MLI	Soumaila Sidibe (from (Algeria) MO Béjaïa)
—	FW	CIV	Manucho (loan return from (Algeria) CS Constantine)
—	DF	ALG	Mohamed Amine Madani (loan return from (Algeria) USM El Harrach)
—	MF	ALG	Oussama Chita (from (Algeria) MC Alger)
—	MF	ALG	Raouf Benguit (on loan from (Algeria) Paradou AC)

Out:

No.	Pos.	Nation	Player
—	DF	ALG	Toufik Zeghdane (to (France) Sedan Ardennes)
—	MF	ALG	Raouf Benguit (loan return to (Algeria) Paradou AC)
—	FW	CIV	Ghislain Guessan (loan return to (Algeria) RC Arbaâ)
—	MF	ALG	Rafik Bouderbal (Unattached)
—	MF	ALG	Abel Khaled ( (Algeria) DRB Tadjenanet)
—	FW	CIV	Manucho ( (Egypt) Al Ittihad Alexandria)
—	FW	MAD	Carolus Andriamatsinoro (to (Saudi Arabia) Ohod Club)
—	DF	ALG	Abderrahim Hamra (on loan to (Algeria) DRB Tadjenanet)
—	FW	ALG	Kaddour Cherif (on loan to (Algeria) DRB Tadjenanet)
—	MF	ALG	Mustapha Bengrina (on loan to (Algeria) US Biskra)
—	MF	ALG	Ibrahim Farhi (on loan to (Algeria) US Biskra)
—	DF	ALG	Mohamed Amine Madani (to (Algeria) JS Saoura)

=== USM Bel-Abbès ===
In:

No.	Pos.	Nation	Player

Out:

No.	Pos.	Nation	Player

=== USM El Harrach ===
In:

No.	Pos.	Nation	Player
—	GK	ALG	Sid Ahmed Rafik Mazouzi (from (Algeria) CA Batna)
—	GK	ALG	Abderrezak Bitam (from (Algeria) CA Batna)
—	MF	ALG	Billel Benaldjia (from (Algeria) USM Bel-Abbès)
—	DF	ALG	Sofiane Khelili (from (Algeria) JS Kabylie)
—	MF	ALG	Zakaria Benhocine (from (Algeria) NA Hussein Dey)
—	MF	ALG	Farid Daoud (from (Algeria) CA Batna)
—	MF	ALG	Karim Nemdil (from (Algeria) CR Belouizdad)
—	MF	ALG	Mourad Delhoum (from (Algeria) MC Oran)
—	MF	ALG	Karim Baïteche (from (Algeria) JS Kabylie)
—	FW	ALG	Hamza Banouh (from (Algeria) Olympique de Médéa)
—	FW	ALG	Hadj Bouguèche (from (Algeria) MC Alger)

Out:

No.	Pos.	Nation	Player
—	MF	ALG	Chamseddine Harrag (to (Algeria) NA Hussein Dey)
—	FW	ALG	Sofiane Younes (to (Algeria) Olympique de Médéa)

=== US Biskra ===
In:

No.	Pos.	Nation	Player

Out:

No.	Pos.	Nation	Player

=== Paradou AC ===
In:

No.	Pos.	Nation	Player

Out:

No.	Pos.	Nation	Player

=== USM Blida ===
In:

No.	Pos.	Nation	Player

Out:

No.	Pos.	Nation	Player

== Ligue Professionnelle 2 ==
=== MC El Eulma ===
In:

No.	Pos.	Nation	Player
5	MF	CMR	Azongha Tembeng Abenego (loan return from (Algeria) ES Sétif)

Out:

No.	Pos.	Nation	Player
—	MF	CMR	Azongha Tembeng Abenego (to (Portugal) CD Tondela)

== Ligue Nationale du Football Amateur ==
=== RC Arbaâ ===
In:

No.	Pos.	Nation	Player
—	FW	CIV	Ghislain Guessan (loan return from (Algeria) USM Alger)

Out:

No.	Pos.	Nation	Player
—	FW	CIV	Ghislain Guessan (to (Norway) Viking)
