= FLN Federation of France =

- Federation in France of the National Liberation Front
- Formation: 1955
- Founder: Mohamed Lebjaoui
- Founded at: Metropolitan France
- Type: Political/militant organisation
- Headquarters: Federal committee (Cologne, Germany from June 1958)
- Region served: Metropolitan France
- Members: 136,345 (1960, incl. ~878 elements from Belgium and the Saar)
- Leaders: Omar Boudaoud; Ali Haroun
- Affiliations: National Liberation Front (FLN)

The Federation in France of the National Liberation Front, sometimes called the seventh wilaya, was the branch of the FLN operating on French soil during the Algerian War (1954–1962). It developed a militarized, bureaucratic apparatus intended to mobilize the Algerian community in metropolitan France for the independence struggle and to regulate many aspects of daily life in preparation for return to an independent Algeria.

Launched in 1954 under the initiative of Mohamed Lebjaoui, its initial mission was to remove the Algerian community in France from the influence of the Algerian National Movement (MNA) led by Messali Hadj. The fratricidal conflict between FLN shock groups and MNA militants—violent settling-of-scores—resulted in more than 6,000 deaths and some 12,000 wounded. The Federation in France gained decisive ascendancy in 1958; it was then led by Omar Boudaoud and Ali Haroun. It was the first time an independence movement launched attacks on the territory of the colonising country.

The Federation sought to influence public opinion, intellectuals and French political circles. It also prepared the opening of a second front through the Organisation spéciale (OS). From 25 August to 27 September 1958, its commandos carried out in France 56 sabotages and 242 attacks against 181 economic, military or political targets (1958 contemporary counts). More selective attacks in 1960 and 1961 targeted members of the auxiliary police force (the harkis of the Paris prefecture of police). During 1961 negotiations between France and the Provisional Government of the Algerian Republic (GPRA), the Federation suspended attacks on 5 July 1961, then resumed operations against police, who reacted strongly from late August. On 17 October 1961 it organised peaceful demonstrations to protest the curfew imposed on "Muslim French" by the Paris prefect of police, Maurice Papon. The resulting repression—ordered or tolerated by the prefecture—remains controversial: dozens killed, hundreds wounded, more than 11,000 arrested and some 22,000 participants.

== History ==
=== The FLN and the Algerian community in metropolitan France ===
The Algerian community in France grew considerably during the 20th century: about 5,000 in 1910, roughly 85,000 in 1937, 211,000 in 1954 and approximately 350,000 in 1962. A large share—about 150,000 people (including ~8,000 women and ~29,000 children in 1961)—was concentrated in the Seine department; adding the suburbs (notably Seine-et-Oise) raises this to roughly 180,000. The migrant population was mainly young men, often married, many having left families in Algeria. Mostly low-literate, they worked as labourers or occasional skilled workers and lived in shantytowns (e.g. Nanterre, Aubervilliers, Argenteuil, Bezons) and in poor Paris districts (Goutte d'Or, Ménilmontant, Quartier Saint-Merri, Porte d'Italie) and nearby suburbs.

The FLN, created in November 1954 by former members of the Organisation spéciale (OS) of the MTLD, adopted an insurrectional strategy and soon clashed with the MNA of Messali Hadj. The rivalry escalated into bloody confrontations (illustrated by the Massacre of Melouza in May 1957), and by 1958 the FLN had largely supplanted the MNA in metropolitan France, though the struggle continued until independence.

Between 1 January 1956 and 23 January 1962, the conflict in metropolitan France produced some 10,223 Algerian victims, including 3,957 killed, according to contemporary tallies. Of 2,124 attacks recorded from 1957 onward, 291 (between January and October 1961) resulted in 137 deaths and 120 wounded among Algerians.

A principal stake in the confrontation was the "revolutionary tax". Monthly contributions (typically 5–9% of wages for workers) were supplemented by exceptional levies during festivals; merchants paid a turnover tax. The rule of "arrears"—requiring payment from the movement's foundation (1 November 1954) rather than from date of joining—created severe hardship for many. Another source of funds was prostitution: pimps and prostitutes were taxed. Reportedly, the revolutionary tax formed nearly 80% of the GPRA budget (the remaining 20% from the Arab League being irregular). The ALN was thus substantially financed by Algerian workers in France.

The FLN extended authority into daily life via local justice committees regulating marriage, divorce and commercial disputes, imposing fines for drinking, brawling, gambling, failing to pay rent, changing address without authorization, failing to attend meetings or refusing to take part in boycotts. From summer 1961 coercion intensified: transgressions against rules drawn from the Quran could lead to severe sanctions; marriages with metropolitan women and recourse to French courts were sometimes punished. The opportunism of cadres increased pressure on contributors and led to inflated fines and aggressive collection methods. The decision to condemn an Algerian to death was taken within the federation; when it concerned a militant or sympathiser it was decided by justice committees rather than a single leader.

Some historians (e.g. Jean-Paul Brunet) describe the federation as totalitarian in practice; others (e.g. Gilbert Meynier) stress that a "bottom-up" view (from lawyers' archives such as those of Jean-Jacques de Félice) reveals more flexibility and the existence of defence networks.

=== Organisation of the FLN in France ===
Operating in a context where the colonial war spilled into metropolitan France, the federation's slogan was reported as "Power is at the end of the rifle".

The leadership organised systematic control of the Algerian population to deprive the MNA of influence. Core tasks were collecting contributions (voluntary or extorted) and transferring funds via French support networks (including so-called "suitcase carriers"), recruiting, and running a press and information commission (CPI), commissions of justice and hygiene, social investigations and detainee support committees.

Until 1958 the FLN used a pyramidal structure that facilitated contact with the base but left it vulnerable to police investigation. A federal meeting in late July 1958 in Cologne decided to open war in metropolitan France as a "second front" to fix French forces in the metropole and relieve pressure in Algeria; this underestimated the imbalance of forces and the repression emigrants would face.

The first attacks of this campaign occurred on the night of 25 August 1958; initial counts gave 24 dead and 17 wounded. On and around 27 August 1958 sabotage operations peaked across France (targets included the Vincennes ammunition depot, a hangar at Le Bourget airport, an industrial site in Villejuif and numerous fuel depots and installations across the country).

The FLN reorganised into small security cells (groups of three or six). It reportedly counted ~450 men in the Paris region for shock groups plus eight "katibas" (companies) of roughly 31 men each forming the Organisation spéciale (OS), a unit of shooters and explosives technicians responsible for difficult missions and eliminating perceived traitors. The FLN also infiltrated cells of Algerian police officers inside the French apparatus and built intelligence networks.

=== The Algerian auxiliaries of the French police: the FPA ===
On 30 November 1959 Prime Minister Michel Debré created an Auxiliary Police Force (FPA), commonly called the "harkis of Paris". This quasi-military brigade, commanded by Captain Raymond Montaner, was composed of local volunteers and modelled on auxiliaries used in Algeria.

The FPA disrupted FLN networks by arresting leaders, hindering activity and blocking fundraising. It recruited informants and targeted suspected supporters; methods included occupation of hotels housing Algerian workers, infiltration, intelligence gathering and, according to several sources, police violence and torture.

The first company (c. 100 men) based in the 13th arrondissement significantly weakened FLN structures, prompting leadership to relocate. A second company was installed in the Goutte d'Or district and was attacked on its opening day (20 November 1960) and again in early December 1960. The third company, based at Fort de Noisy, operated mobile units in suburban shantytowns. The FPA's effectiveness as a frontline force was accompanied by allegations of illegal methods (arbitrary arrests, detention and torture), which its veterans dispute.

=== FLN attacks against the French police ===
With the opening of the second front in France (1958), the FLN targeted police and strategic installations. Paris in particular was symbolically important; actions there carried significant propagandistic value. In January 1959 General de Gaulle granted clemency to those sentenced to death in a gesture toward peace, and executions ceased in January 1961.

In its organ El Moudjahid, the FLN asserted that executions were only ordered after criminal judgment and that only policemen found guilty would be punished; it defended some actions as aimed at collaborators.

Nevertheless, many attacks directed at police resembled indiscriminate violence. In some cases attackers resisted arrest; in others there were ambushes on police vehicles and attempts or assassinations of law enforcement personnel. Police recorded threats such as surveillance of homes, warnings painted on doors, death threats and names appearing in documents seized by authorities. Fifty-three such threats were recorded after 1 September (year indicated in source). The majority of attacks targeted individual officials judged to be accessible.

Police repression and better organisation curtailed many FLN commando operations and led to numerous arrests. By September 1958 police efforts had already disrupted the movement's apparatus (files, transfers between hotels and hostels, round-ups, internment in supervised residence centres such as the Larzac camp, and forced repatriation).

Police killed or wounded by attacks (selected years)
Year	1957	1958	1959	1960	Jan–Oct 1961	Total (1957–Oct 1961)
Killed	0	12	4	9	22	47
Wounded	3	22	10	29	76	140

The total of 47 killed breaks down as follows: 23 peacekeepers, 4 judicial police officers, 14 FPA agents, 3 SAT-FMA personnel (Services d'assistance technique aux Français musulmans d'Algérie) and 2 from other services.

== Means and results ==
=== Structure ===
Nicknamed the "seventh Wilaya", the federation reproduced a pyramidal organisation at every level. The number and borders of the wilayas were adjusted according to personnel. The FLN divided metropolitan France into regions:

- I — Paris region and West (Paris)
- II — North and East (Longwy)
- III — Central region (Lyon)
- IV — South-East region (Marseille)

Activists, members and sympathisers were separated into distinct organisations to reduce the risk of mass dismantlement. The federal committee sat in Cologne (Germany) from June 1958.

=== Strength ===
By 1956 the organisation counted more than 8,000 members; recruitment increased membership to about 136,345 in 1960, including some 878 elements from Belgium and the Saar.

=== Funds collected ===
To supply arms to the wilayas, the Federation's key mission was fundraising among Algerian workers in France (estimated at ~250,000 by the French Ministry of Labour). Reported collections from January 1955 to March 1962 totalled about 40 billion old francs (sources differ), representing an estimated 80% of GPRA resources in 1961 according to Ali Haroun. Funds were transferred abroad and, from 1961, to wilayas in Algeria via specialised networks.

List of levies (old francs)

- Worker / labourer: 2,000 F/month
- Muslim woman: 500 F/month
- Muslim taxi driver: 8,000 F/month
- Muslim prostitute or European prostitute with a Muslim pimp: 5,000 F/month
- Merchant: 10,000 F/month

Revenue collected by the FLN Federation in France (old francs)
1958	1959	1960	1961
2,815,477,235	5,071,191,925	5,968,201,321	approximately 6,000,000,000 (for ~150,000 contributors)

From January 1955 to March 1962 the Federation collected approximately 40,000,000,000 old francs in France.

=== War against the MNA ===
Algerian victims of settling-of-scores between FLN and MNA in France (1 Jan 1956 – 31 Dec 1961)
Year	1956	1957	1958	1959	1960
Killed	76	817	902	687	529
Wounded	510	3,088	1,641	815	982

=== Attacks against the police ===
Police killed or wounded by FLN attacks (selected years)
Year	1958	1959	1960	Jan–Oct 1961
Killed	12	4	9	29
Wounded	22	10	29	76

== Bibliography ==
- Brunet, Jean-Paul (1999). Police contre FLN. Flammarion. ISBN 978-2-08-067691-7.
- Brunet, Jean-Paul (2003). Charonne. Flammarion. ISBN 978-2-08-068341-0.
- Meynier, Gilbert (2002). Histoire intérieure du FLN, 1954–1962. Fayard. ISBN 978-2-213-61377-2.
- House, Jim; MacMaster, Neil (2006). Paris 1961: Algerians, State Terror and Memory. Oxford University Press (French edition Tallandier 2008). ISBN 978-2-84734-491-2.
- Muelle, Raymond (2001). 7 ans de guerre en France. Grancher. ISBN 978-2-7339-0719-1.
- Amiri, Linda (2004). La bataille de France. Robert Laffont. ISBN 978-2-221-10049-3.
- Péju, Marcel (2011). Le 17 octobre 1961 des Algériens. Tallandier. ISBN 978-2-7071-7117-7.
- Valat, Rémy (2007). Les calots bleus et la bataille de Paris. Michalon. ISBN 978-2-84186-382-2.
- Simon, Jacques (2007). Algérie: le passé, l'Algérie française, la révolution, 1954–1958. L'Harmattan. ISBN 978-2-296-02858-6.
- Tas, Idir (2024). En mémoire de mon père, Les éditions du Net, ISBN 978-2-312-14500-6.
- Vallat, Rémy (2004). "Un tournant dans la 'Bataille de Paris'". Outre-Mers 91(342–343): 321–344. DOI:10.3406/outre.2004.4097.
- Dossier de L'Express, 24–30 April 1987 — "Sources of the FLN Federation in France". (cited as Express1987)

== Filmography ==
- 1962 – Octobre à Paris, documentary by Jacques Panijel (1h10).
- 1972 – La Guerre d'Algérie by Yves Courrière & Philippe Monnier.
- 1985 – Meurtres pour mémoire, TV film by Laurent Heynemann.
- 1992 – Une Journée portée disparue, documentary by Philip Brooks & Alan Hayling (52 min).
- 2001 – 17 October 1961: Concealment of a massacre, Daniel Kupferstein.
- 2001 – 17 October 1961, return of memory, Virginie Delahautemaison.
- 2001 – The war without a name in Paris: A night of October 1961, Aude Touly.
- 2002 – Mémoires du 17 October 1961, Faïza Guène & Bernard Richard.
- 2005 – Black Night, 17 October 1961, Alain Tasma.
- 2005 – Hidden (Caché), Michael Haneke.
- 2010 – Outside the Law, Rachid Bouchareb.
- 2010 – Secret war of the FLN in France, Malek Bensmaïl.
- 2010 – Maurice Papon, itinerary of a man of order, Emmanuel Hamon.
- 2011 – Here we drown Algerians – 17 October 1961, Yasmina Adi.

== See also ==
- Massacre of 17 October 1961
- National Liberation Front (FLN)
- National Liberation Army (ALN)
- Autonomous Zone of Algiers (ZAA)
