= Zineddine Belaïd =

Algerian footballer (born 1999)

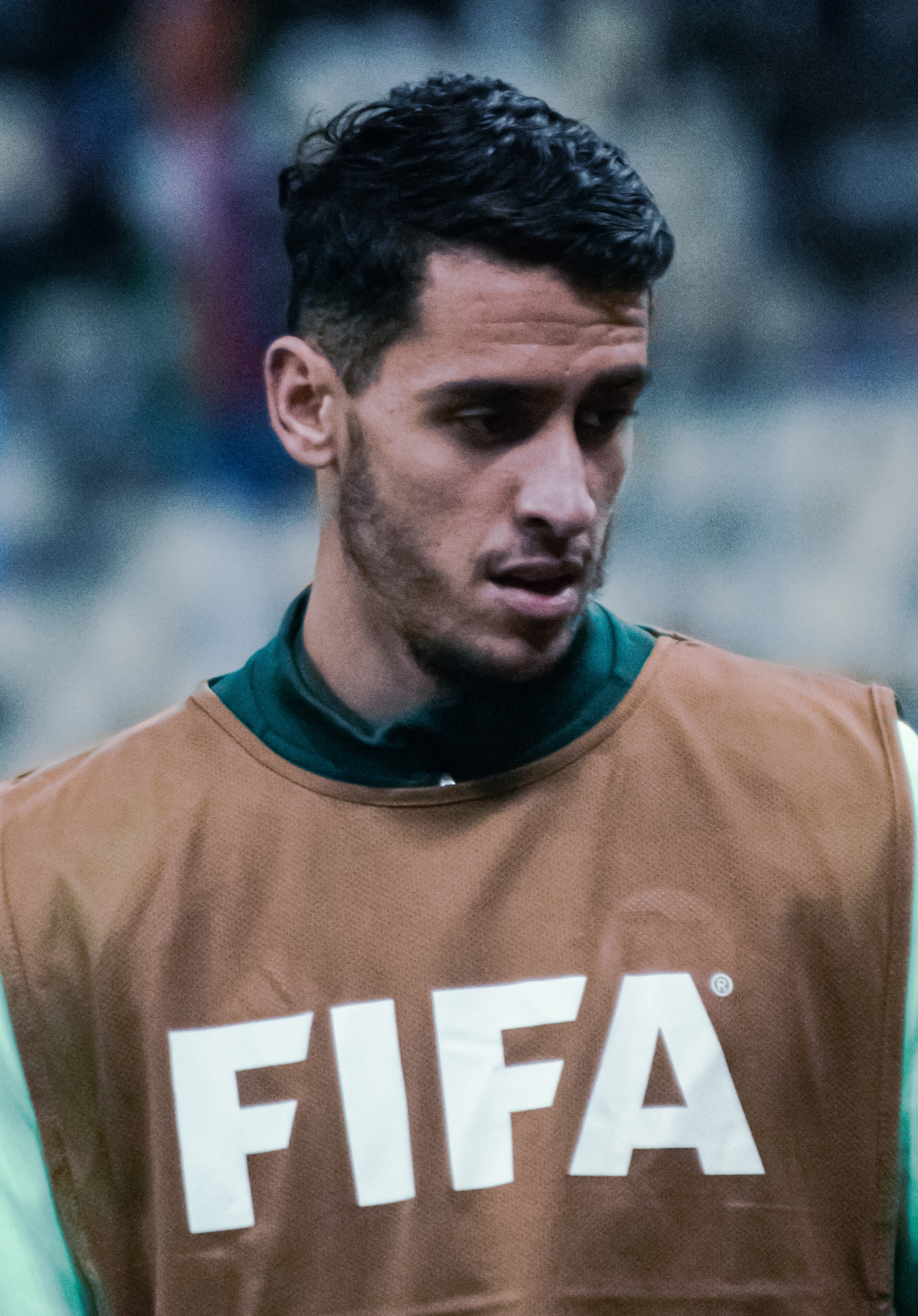
- Belaïd in 2024

Personal information
- Date of birth: 20 March 1999 (age 27)
- Place of birth: Thénia, Algeria
- Height: 1.86 m (6 ft 1 in)
- Position: Centre-back

Team information
- Current team: Al Taawoun
- Number: 5

Youth career
- –2019: NA Hussein Dey

Senior career*
Years	Team	Apps	(Gls)
2019–2020	NA Hussein Dey	21	(1)
2020–2024	USM Alger	104	(7)
2024–2025	Sint-Truiden	12	(0)
2025–2026	JS Kabylie	22	(1)
2026–	Al Taawoun	0	(0)

International career^{‡}
2017	Algeria U20	6	(1)
2018	Algeria U23	3	(0)
2021–2023	Algeria A'	11	(0)
2023–	Algeria	21	(1)
Medal record
Men's football
Representing Algeria
African Nations Championship
Silver medal – second place	2022 Algeria	Team
- * Club domestic league appearances and goals as of 13 July 2026 ‡ National team caps and goals as of 6 October 2026 (UTC)

Zineddine Belaïd (Arabic: زَيْن الدِّين بَلْعِيد; Tamazight: ⵣⵉⵏⴷⴷⵉⵏ ⴱⵍⵄⵉⴷ; born 20 March 1999) is an Algerian professional footballer who plays as a centre-back for Saudi Pro League club Al Taawoun and the Algeria national team.

== Club career ==
On 31 May 2018, Zinedine Belaïd signed his first professional contract with NA Hussein Dey and played his first match at the professional level on 20 January 2019 in the CAF Confederation Cup against Al-Ahly Benghazi of Libya. In his first season, Belaid only played three matches. In his second season Belaid became a key piece in the team and on 30 October 2019, Belaid scored the first goal in his football career against JS Saoura which led him to a 1–0 victory. On 11 October 2020, Belaïd signed a four-year contract with USM Alger. Belaïd became a key player in the team and got the captain's armband, Belaïd is in the sights of Al-Arabi SC winners of this season's Emir of Qatar Cup, The coach Younes Ali would already be delighted to see the native of the city of Isser (Boumerdès) in his ranks. Indeed, the coach would have watched the first leg of the CAF Confederation Cup final between USMA and Young Africans, He would then have given the green light to the management of the Qatari club to try this summer.

On 3 June 2023, Belaïd won the first title in his football career by winning the 2022–23 CAF Confederation Cup after defeating Young Africans of Tanzania. On 17 August 2023, Belaïd has finally extended her contract for two years. Many clubs contacted USM Alger captain during this transfer period, as the Belgian club Sint-Truiden made an official offer for the player, but the latter rejected it in the end. On 15 September 2023, Belaïd led USM Alger to win the CAF Super Cup against Al Ahly by scoring the only goal in the match, winning the second title in three months. Despite renewing his contract with USMA, Belaïd still has ambitions to professionalize in Europe. On 23 June 2024, Zineddine Belaïd met with the chairman of the Board of Directors of USM Alger Athmane Sehbane, where he agreed that he would officially leave. The team's management finally agreed not to put obstacles in the way of the player's ambition and in a way that preserves the rights of the club. The agreement was finally concluded to fulfill the desire of Belaïd to join the Belgian club Sint-Truiden and signed his exit paper.

On 23 August 2025, Belaïd signed a three-year contract with JS Kabylie. In July 2026, he left JS Kabylie.

On 3 August 2026, he joined Saudi Pro League club Al Taawoun.

== International career ==
In June 2021, Zineddine Belaïd was called up by Madjid Bougherra for the first time to the Algeria A' national team against Liberia to inaugurate the new stadium in Oran in 5–1 victory. On 2 January 2023, Belaïd was selected for the 28-man squad to participate in the 2022 African Nations Championship. Belaïd played all the matches reaching the final, settling for runner-up after the defeat against Senegal. On 30 May 2023 the FAF publish the list of Djamel Belmadi for the two matches of the month of June, Where is called Belaïd for the first time and his first match was against Uganda in the Africa Cup of Nations qualification. On 29 December 2023, Belaïd was named by Djamel Belmadi to Algeria's 26-man squad for the 2023 Africa Cup of Nations.

On 31 May 2026, Belaïd was named in Vladimir Petković's 26-man Algeria squad for the 2026 FIFA World Cup.

== Career statistics ==
=== Club ===
As of 20 May 2026

Appearances and goals by club, season and competition
Club	Season	League			Cup		Continental		Other		Total	
Club	Season	Division	Apps	Goals	Apps	Goals	Apps	Goals	Apps	Goals	Apps	Goals
NA Hussein Dey	2018–19	Ligue 1	2	0	—		1 (Note: Appearance(s) in CAF Confederation Cup)	0	—		3	0
NA Hussein Dey	2019–20	Ligue 1	19	1	2	0	—		—		21	1
NA Hussein Dey	Total		21	1	2	0	1	0	—		24	1
USM Alger	2020–21	Ligue 1	33	1	—		—		3 (Note: Appearances in Algerian League Cup)	0	36	1
USM Alger	2021–22	Ligue 1	30	3	—		—		—		30	3
USM Alger	2022–23	Ligue 1	23	3	—		16	3	—		39	6
USM Alger	2023–24	Ligue 1	18	0	4	3	10 (Note: One appearance, one goal in CAF Super Cup; nine appearances, one goal in CAF Confederation Cup)	2	—		32	5
USM Alger	Total		104	7	4	3	26	5	3	0	137	15
Sint-Truiden	2024–25	Belgian Pro League	12	0	3	0	—		—		15	0
JS Kabylie	2025–26	Ligue 1	22	1	1	0	10 (Note: Appearances in CAF Champions League)	0	—		33	1
Career total			159	9	10	3	37	5	3	0	209	17

== Honours ==
Algeria A'

- African Nations Championship runner-up: 2022

USM Alger

- CAF Confederation Cup: 2022–23
- CAF Super Cup: 2023
