= Imadeddine Azzi =

Algerian footballer (born 1998)

Personal information
- Date of birth: 21 June 1998 (age 28)
- Place of birth: Ouargla, Algeria
- Height: 1.93 m (6 ft 4 in)
- Position: Defender

Team information
- Current team: USM Alger
- Number: 5

Youth career
- –2018: MC Alger

Senior career*
Years	Team	Apps	(Gls)
2017–2018	MC Alger	0	(0)
2018–2021	NA Hussein Dey	44	(1)
2021–2025	Kazma SC		(0)
2024–2025	→ USM Alger (loan)	19	(1)
2025–2026	Dynamo Makhachkala	4	(0)
2026–	USM Alger	9	(0)

International career^{‡}
2018	Algeria U21	1	(0)
2018	Algeria U23	1	(0)
- * Club domestic league appearances and goals as of 6 June 2026 ‡ National team caps and goals as of 15 October 2018

Imadeddine Azzi (Arabic: عماد الدين عزي; born 21 June 1998) is an Algerian professional footballer who plays as a defender for USM Alger.

== Early life ==
Azzi was born on 21 June 1998 in Ouargla, Algeria. The younger brother of Algeria international Ayoub Azzi, he is the older brother of Algerian footballer Mohamed Azzi.

== Club career ==
As a youth player, Azzi joined the youth academy of Algerian side MC Alger in 2017, where he made zero league appearances and scored zero goals. Ahead of the 2018–19 season, he signed for Algerian side NA Hussein Dey, where he made forty-four league appearances and scored one goal. Following his stint there, he signed for Kuwaiti side Kazma SC in 2021.

Three years later, he was sent on loan to Algerian side USM Alger, where he made nineteen league appearances and scored one goal and helped the club win the 2024–25 Algerian Cup. African news website AfricaFoot wrote in 2025 that he "established himself as a central defensive pillar" while playing for them. During the summer of 2025, he signed for Russian side FC Dynamo Makhachkala, joining his brother Mohamed. On 31 January 2026, he returned to USM Alger.

== International career ==
Azzi is an Algeria youth international. On 15 October 2018, he debuted for the Algeria national under-23 football team during a 1–2 away friendly loss to the Morocco national under-23 football team.

== Career statistics ==
As of 10 September 2026

Club	Season	League			Cup		Continental		Other		Total	
Club	Season	Division	Apps	Goals	Apps	Goals	Apps	Goals	Apps	Goals	Apps	Goals
MC Alger	2017–18	Ligue 1	0	0	–		–		–		0	0
NA Hussein Dey	2018–19	Ligue 1	2	0	1	0	3 (Note: All appearance(s) in CAF Confederation Cup)	0	–		6	0
NA Hussein Dey	2019–20	Ligue 1	15	1	1	0	–		–		16	1
NA Hussein Dey	2020–21	Ligue 1	27	0	0	0	–		2 (Note: Appearances in Algerian League Cup)	0	29	0
NA Hussein Dey	Total		44	1	2	0	3	0	2	0	51	1
USM Alger (loan)	2024–25	Ligue 1	19	1	3	0	4	0	–		26	1
Dynamo Makhachkala	2025–26	Russian Premier League	4	0	5	0	–		–		9	0
USM Alger	2025–26	Ligue 1	9	0	2	0	—		—		11	0
USM Alger	2026–27	Ligue 1	1	0	0	0	0	0	0 (Note: All appearances in Algerian Super Cup)	0	1	0
USM Alger	Total		9	0	2	0	—		—		11	0
Career total			76	2	12	0	7	0	2	0	97	2

== Honours ==
USM Alger

- Algerian Cup: 2024–25, 2025–26
- CAF Super Cup: 2026
