= Mohamed Lebjaoui =

- محمد لبجاوي
- Born: February 20, 1926; Algiers, French Algeria
- Died: February 24, 1992 (aged 66)
- Occupations: Politician, writer, poet
- Known for: Member of the National Council of the Algerian Revolution (CNRA); Founder of the FLN Federation of France

Mohamed Lebjaoui (also spelled Mohamed El-Yajouri; (in Arabic محمد لبجاوي) was an Algerian politician, writer, and poet. A historical leader of the Algerian War of Independence, he served as an alternate member of the first National Council of the Algerian Revolution (CNRA) and launched the FLN Federation of France in 1954. Arrested in February 1957, he spent five years imprisoned in France.

== Biography ==
=== Early life and background ===
Mohamed Lebjaoui was born on 20 February 1926 in Algiers into a wealthy family of merchants. After completing his studies, he became a prosperous businessman. He was close to Tayeb El-Okbi, a prominent member of the Association of Algerian Muslim Ulama. In the early 1950s, he served as a mediator between the Ulama activists and the Movement for the Triumph of Democratic Liberties (MTLD) led by Messali Hadj, and later the MTLD “Centralists” who succeeded him.

In January 1956, when Albert Camus launched the “Appeal for a Civil Truce” in Algiers, Lebjaoui joined the Committee for the Civil Truce.

=== Role in the Algerian Revolution ===
In August 1956, Lebjaoui took part in drafting the platform of the Soummam Congress. He became an alternate member of the National Council of the Algerian Revolution (CNRA). Shortly after, Abane Ramdane sent him to France to establish the FLN Federation of France with the goal of supplanting Messali Hadj’s Algerian National Movement (MNA) among the Algerian diaspora in France.

Lebjaoui was arrested on 27 February 1957, on the eve of the Eight-Day Strike, and spent over five years in French prisons, including Fresnes Prison and La Santé Prison.

During his imprisonment, Algerian nationalist detainees were initially treated as common criminals. Lebjaoui organized a hunger strike with fellow prisoners to demand political prisoner status for those linked to the FLN and MNA. The protest succeeded, and the inmates were transferred to a dedicated ward with improved living conditions and protection from violent reprisals.

=== Later political activity ===
Freed in 1962, Lebjaoui opposed the 1965 Algerian coup d'état and remained loyal to President Ahmed Ben Bella, serving as one of his political advisers. When Houari Boumédiène refused to hold elections, Lebjaoui joined the opposition and went into exile.

He lived in exile from 1965 to 1990, mainly in Geneva, Switzerland.

=== Death ===
Mohamed Lebjaoui died on 24 February 1992 at the age of 68. He was buried in the Martyrs’ Square of the El Alia Cemetery in Algiers.

== Works ==
=== Essays ===
- Vérités sur la révolution algérienne (Truths about the Algerian Revolution), Gallimard, 1970, 249 pp. ISBN 978-9947214725.
- Bataille d’Alger ou batailles d’Algérie (Battle of Algiers or Battles of Algeria), Gallimard, 1972, 306 pp.

=== Poetry ===
- Un morceau de lune et une étoile couleur de sang (A Piece of Moon and a Star the Color of Blood), preface by Georges Haldas, L’Harmattan, 1975, 129 pp.
- Sous le bras, mon soleil (Under My Arm, My Sun), Grounauer/L’Harmattan, 1981, 70 pp.

== See also ==
- Algerian War of Independence
- Movement for the Triumph of Democratic Liberties
- 1965 Algerian coup d'état
