= Ali Haroun =

Algerian politician (1927–2026)

- علي هارون
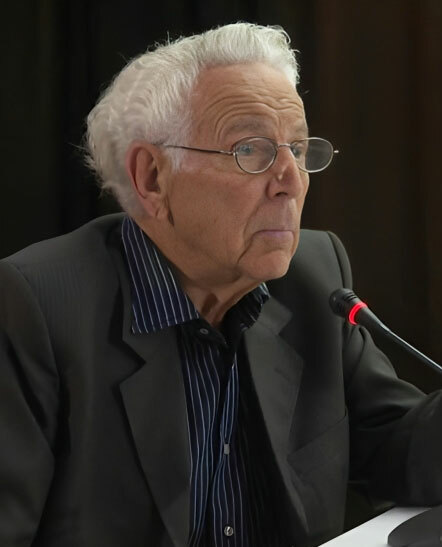
- Haroun in 2013

Member of the High Council of State
- In office 14 January 1992 – 30 January 1994

Personal details
- Born: 8 February 1927 Bir Mourad Raïs, French Algeria
- Died: 24 October 2026 (aged 99)

Mohamed Ali Haroun (Arabic: محمد علي هارون; 8 February 1927 – 24 October 2026) was an Algerian politician. He was a member of the High Council of State from 14 January 1992 to 30 January 1994. With the death of Khaled Nezzar, Haroun was the last living member of the High Council of State. Haroun was born on 8 February 1927. He died on 24 October 2026, aged 99.
