= Abderrahmane Yousfi =

Algerian footballer (born 1994)

Personal information
- Full name: Abderrahmane Yousfi
- Date of birth: June 30, 1994 (age 32)
- Place of birth: Oran, Algeria
- Position: Forward

Team information
- Current team: NA Hussein Dey
- Number: 19

Youth career
- ASM Oran
- 2012–2013: Marseille

Senior career*
Years	Team	Apps	(Gls)
2013–2015	Marseille B	29	(4)
2015–2016	Saint-Ouen	17	(5)
2016–2017	Rennes B	25	(6)
2017	Créteil	2	(0)
2018–	NA Hussein Dey	1	(1)
- * Club domestic league appearances and goals as of 20:00, January 20, 2018 (EST)

Abderrahmane Yousfi (born June 30, 1994) is an Algerian footballer who currently plays for NA Hussein Dey in the Algerian Ligue Professionnelle 1. An ASM Oran youth product, he moved to France when he was 16 to continue his footballing career and joined Olympique de Marseille's youth ranks in 2012.
