= Kheireddine Boussouf =

Algerian association football player (born 1987)

Personal information
- Date of birth: 7 December 1987 (age 38)
- Place of birth: Constantine, Algeria
- Height: 1.92 m (6 ft 4 in)
- Position: Goalkeeper

Team information
- Current team: ES Ben Aknoun
- Number: 16

Senior career*
Years	Team	Apps	(Gls)
2011–2013	CRB Aïn Fakroun		(0)
2013–2014	JS Saoura	13	(0)
2013–2015	Olympique de Médéa	22	(0)
2015–2016	NA Hussein Dey	28	(0)
2016–2017	MC Alger	5	(0)
2017–2019	NA Hussein Dey	22	(0)
2019–2020	Al-Tai		(0)
2020–2021	AS Aïn M'lila	9	(0)
2021–2023	Paradou AC	44	(0)
2023–2025	CS Constantine	20	(0)
2025–	ES Ben Aknoun	27	(0)
- * Club domestic league appearances and goals as of 6 June 2025

Kheireddine Boussouf (Arabic: خير الدين بوصوف; born 12 December 1987) is an Algerian footballer who plays as a goalkeeper for ES Ben Aknoun in the Algerian Ligue Professionnelle 1.

== Career ==
In 2016, Boussouf joined MC Alger. In 2017, he signed for NA Hussein Dey. In 2019, he joined Saudi Club Al-Tai. In 2020, signed for AS Aïn M'lila. In 2021, he joined Paradou AC. In 2023, he signed for CS Constantine. In 2025, he joined ES Ben Aknoun.
