= Mehdi Ouertani =

Tunisian footballer

Personal information
- Full name: Mehdi Ouertani
- Date of birth: 17 June 1990 (age 36)
- Place of birth: Marseille, Algeria
- Height: 1.84 m (6 ft 0 in)
- Position: Midfielder

Youth career
- 2003–2006: FC Istres

Senior career*
Years	Team	Apps	(Gls)
2008–2009	US Marseille Endoume		
2009–2011	CA Bizerte	22	(0)
2012	Stade Tunisien	4	(1)
2012–2013	AS Marsa	16	(0)
2013	Olympique Béja	5	(0)
2014–2015	ES Metlaoui	35	(1)
2015–2016	US Ben Guerdane	26	(0)
2016	JS Kairouan	5	(0)
2017–2019	NA Hussein Dey	47	(1)
2019–2020	MC Alger	8	(0)
2020–2021	USM Bel Abbès	20	(1)
2021–2022	Les Herbiers VF	5	(0)
- * Club domestic league appearances and goals as of 27 August 2023

Mehdi Ouertani (Arabic: مهدي الورتاني; born 17 June 1990) is a Tunisian footballer. Mehdi Ouertani has also the Algerian nationality from his mother, He is considered as a local player from the Algerian league.

== Career ==
In 2017, he joined NA Hussein Dey. In 2019, he joined MC Alger. In 2020, he joined USM Bel Abbès.
