= Belkacem Brahimi =

Algerian footballer (born 1994)

Personal information
- Full name: Belkacem Brahimi
- Date of birth: 20 January 1994 (age 32)
- Place of birth: Bou Saada, Algeria
- Height: 1.76 m (5 ft 9 in)
- Position: Defender

Team information
- Current team: ASO Chlef
- Number: 20

Youth career
- –2013: A Bou Saada

Senior career*
Years	Team	Apps	(Gls)
2013–2017	A Bou Saada		
2017–2019	NA Hussein Dey	46	(3)
2019–2021	MC Alger	31	(3)
2021–2024	ES Sétif	53	(0)
2024-	ASO Chlef	52	(1)
- * Club domestic league appearances and goals as of 5 June 2026

Belkacem Brahimi (Arabic: بلقاسم براهيمي; born 20 January 1994) is an Algerian footballer who plays for ASO Chlef in the Algerian Ligue Professionnelle 1.

== Career ==
In 2019, he signed a contract with MC Alger. In 2021, Brahimi joined ES Sétif. In 2024, he joined ASO Chlef.
