= Walid Allati =

Algerian footballer (born 1991)

Personal information
- Date of birth: 1 August 1991 (age 35)
- Place of birth: El Bayadh, Algeria
- Height: 1.72 m (5 ft 8 in)
- Position: Defender

Youth career
- –2013: USM El Harrach

Senior career*
Years	Team	Apps	(Gls)
2013–2014	CRB Ben Badis	1	(0)
2014–2017	US Biskra		
2017–2019	NA Hussein Dey	46	(7)
2019–2021	MC Alger	21	(1)
2021–2022	MC Oran	23	(1)
2022–2023	MC El Bayadh	19	(0)
2023–2024	JSM Tiaret	0	(0)
- * Club domestic league appearances and goals as of 30 August 2023

Walid Allati (Arabic: وليد علاطي; born 1 August 1991) is an Algerian footballer who plays as a defender.

== Career ==
In 2019, Allati signed a two-year contract with MC Alger.

In 2021, he joined MC Oran.

In 2022, he joined MC El Bayadh.
