= Chamseddine Harrag =

Algerian footballer (born 1992)

Personal information
- Full name: Chamseddine Harrag
- Date of birth: 10 August 1992 (age 34)
- Place of birth: Bourouba, Algeria
- Height: 1.76 m (5 ft 9 in)
- Position: Midfielder

Team information
- Current team: NA Hussein Dey
- Number: 24

Youth career
- 2005–2013: USM El Harrach

Senior career*
| Years | Team | Apps | (Gls) |
| 2013–2017 | USM El Harrach | 72 | (5) |
| 2017–2019 | NA Hussein Dey | 50 | (1) |
| 2019–2021 | MC Alger | 38 | (0) |
| 2021–2023 | JS Kabylie | 41 | (2) |
| 2023–2024 | Wej | | |
| 2024–2025 | USM El Harrach | | |
| 2025– | NA Hussein Dey | | |
- * Club domestic league appearances and goals as of 10 November 2025

Chamseddine Harrag (Arabic: شمس الدين حراق; born 10 August 1992) is an Algerian footballer who plays for NA Hussein Dey.

== Career ==
Harrag started his professional career at USM El Harrach on 1 July 2013 and played in 3 matches, The 13/14 season Harrag played for only 2 minutes. Harrag's third season was his breakthrough season playing 19 games and 1,211 minutes. During his 4th season he played in 28 games (2,506 minutes), scoring 2 goals and 2 assists as a left-back. His fifth season was another great one playing in 25 matches scoring 3 goals and getting 2 assists, he also got called up for Algerian national team. Next season he played 25 games and scored 1 and got himself 8 assist. In July 2019, he joined MC Alger. In October 2021, he joined JS Kabylie. On 20 January 2023, Harrag joined Saudi Arabian club Wej. On 5 February 2024, Harrag returned to USM El Harrach. On 19 January 2025, he joined NA Hussein Dey.
