= Mohamed Zougrana =

Ivorian footballer (born 2001)

Personal information
- Full name: Mohamed Tchapi Zougrana
- Date of birth: 29 October 2001 (age 25)
- Place of birth: Daloa, Ivory Coast
- Height: 1.79 m (5 ft 10 in)
- Position: Midfielder

Team information
- Current team: MC Alger
- Number: 12

Senior career*
Years	Team	Apps	(Gls)
2020–2021	SO Armée	0	(0)
2021–2023	ASEC Mimosas	0	(0)
2023–	MC Alger	64	(3)

International career^{‡}
2023	Ivory Coast	3	(0)
2025–	Burkina Faso	4	(2)
- * Club domestic league appearances and goals as of 5 June 2026 ‡ National team caps and goals as of 8 October 2025

Mohamed Tchapi Zougrana (born 29 October 2001) is a professional footballer who plays as a midfielder for MC Alger in the Algerian Ligue Professionnelle 1. Born in Ivory Coast, Zougrana represents the Burkina Faso national team.

== Club career ==
In March 2023, his agent Nasser Diallo announced that the Egyptian giants Al Ahly were interested in signing Mohamed Zougrana. However, no official offers were been sent. On July 19, 2023, Mohamed Zougrana signed up with MC Alger for a period of four years. The amount of the transfer was estimated at 200,000 euros according to some sources. After his good performance at the beginning of the season, the MC Alger administration announced the renewal of his contract for another season until 2028. On May 17, 2024, Zougrana scored the winning goal in the Algiers Derby, helping Mouloudia win the Ligue 1 title four rounds before the end.

== International career ==
Mohamed Zougrana was in the group of the local Ivorian selection which participated in the African Nations Championship (CHAN) organized in Algeria. Zoungrana will keep memories of this competition, more or less bad. The midfielder received a red card in the second match against the DR Congo. Absent during the Elephants' victory against Uganda on the third round, Zougrana made his return against Algeria in the quarter-finals. A meeting which ultimately ended in a defeat at the last minute. Zougrana a native of Abidjan, the former ASEC Mimosas player is nevertheless of Burkinabe origin and is eligible to represent Burkina Faso national team. Zougrana has not yet commented on this subject.

On March 1, 2025, Mohamed Zougrana has been called up for the first time in his career by the Burkina Faso squad for the 2026 World Cup qualifiers against Djibouti and Guinea-Bissau. The former Ivorian youth international's request to change his sporting nationality was approved by FIFA and since Zugrana is of Burkinabe origin, he could have chosen another national team. Burkina Faso's former coach, Hubert Velud, had also insisted to the Burkinabe federation to speed up the process of obtaining his sporting nationality. During his time with the Ivorian national team, Zougrana only made three appearances for local Ivory Coast.

== International goals ==
No.	Date	Venue	Opponent	Score	Result	Competition
1.	21 March 2025	Ben M'Hamed El Abdi Stadium, El Jadida, Morocco	Djibouti	3–0	4–1	2026 FIFA World Cup qualification
2.	8 October 2025	Samuel Kanyon Doe Sports Complex, Paynesville, Liberia	Sierra Leone	1–0	1–0	2026 FIFA World Cup qualification

== Career statistics ==
=== Club ===
As of 6 March 2025

Club	Season	League			Cup		Continental		Other		Total	
Club	Season	Division	Apps	Goals	Apps	Goals	Apps	Goals	Apps	Goals	Apps	Goals
ASEC Mimosas	2021–22	Ligue 1 Ivory Coast	—		—		8 (Note: Three appearances in CAF Champions League, five appearances in CAF Confederation Cup)	0	—		8	0
ASEC Mimosas	2022–23	Ligue 1 Ivory Coast	—		—		15 (Note: Four appearances in CAF Champions League, eleven appearances in CAF Confederation Cup)	0	—		15	0
ASEC Mimosas	Total		—		—		23	0	—		23	0
MC Alger	2023–24	Ligue 1 Algeria	20	2	5	1	—		—		25	3
MC Alger	2024–25	Ligue 1 Algeria	14	0	1	0	6 (Note: All appearance(s) in Champions League)	0	1 (Note: All appearances in Algerian Super Cup)	0	22	0
MC Alger	Total		34	2	6	1	6	0	1	0	47	3
Career total			34	2	6	1	29	0	1	0	70	3

== Honours ==
=== Club ===
ASEC Mimosas

- Ligue 1 Ivory Coast: 2022, 2023
- Coupe de Côte d'Ivoire: 2023

MC Alger

- Algerian Ligue Professionnelle 1: 2023–24
- Algerian Super Cup: 2024
