= 2023–24 MC Alger season =

MC Alger
2023–24 season
- Owner: Sonatrach
- President: Mohamed Hakim Hadj Redjem
- Head coach: Patrice Beaumelle
- Stadium: Omar Benrabah Stadium; Stade du 5 Juillet
- Ligue 1: 1st
- Algerian Cup: Runners-up
- Top goalscorer: League: Youcef Belaïli (14 goals); All: Youcef Belaïli (16 goals)
- Biggest win: MC Alger 4–0 ES Ben Aknoun
- Biggest defeat: CS Constantine 2–1 MC Alger
| Home colours | Away colours | Third colours |

The 2023–24 season, is MC Alger's 55th season and the club's 20th consecutive season in the top flight of Algerian football. In addition to the domestic league, MC Alger are participating in the Algerian Cup.

== Review ==
=== Background ===
In a recent press release, August 7, 2023, the Mouloudia Club d'Alger announced the renewal of its contract with its equipment supplier Puma. This new lease links the Algiers club to the German company specializing in the manufacturing of sporting goods for the next two seasons. On 5 October 2023 MC Alger announced the appointment of the club's former player Mohamed Khazrouni to the position of general coordinator of the first team, as a reminder, the position of general coordinator of the first team has been vacant since the departure of Fayçal Badji. The MC Alger sports center has risen from the ground better yet, he’s moving forward with sure steps. According to an internal source, it should be ready by the end of the current year. The photo of the chairman of the board of directors of the MCA from the top of a glass building alone symbolizes the state of progress of the training and training center of the MC Alger in Zéralda. According to an authorized source, this complex, which will include an administrative building, a hotel, two conference rooms and two training fields, one of which will be made of hybrid grass, will be ready in December 2023.

=== Pre-season ===
MC Alger squad returned to training on September 3, 2023, after a break of a few days decided by Patrice Beaumelle. After a first preparation course in Rennes in France, Youcef Belaili's teammates will continue with a second part in the Capital. They trained at École supérieure d'hôtellerie et restauration d'Alger (ESHRA). Beaumelle added « I am satisfied with the boys’ performance. They were able to repeat the scales and continue to create automatisms. We were able to recover all the players along with those who could not travel for the preparation. I'm trying to do a squad tour and get everyone ready for the start of the championship ».

==== First-team transfers (summer transfer window) ====
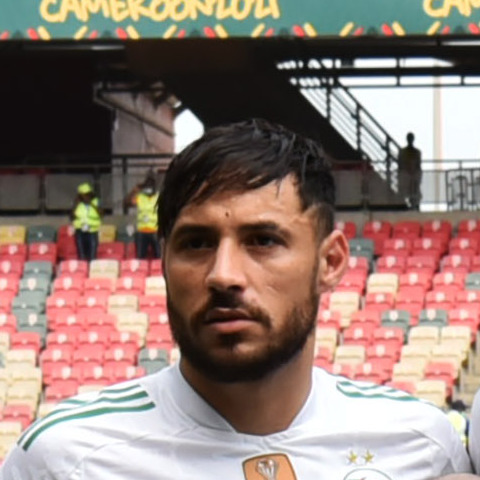
Youcef Belaïli becoming the highest salary ever received by a player in Ligue 1.

After the end of last season, club president Mohamed Hakim Hadj Redjem announced that the club would make major signings, MC Alger has its first summer recruit he is ASEC Mimosas midfielder Mohamed Zougrana, The Ivorian international has signed up for a period of four years. The amount of the transfer is estimated at 200,000 euros according to some sources. The next day Hadj Redjem signing two seasons with international defender Djamel Benlamri coming from the Emirates. On July 27, Sofiane Bayazid striker USM Khenchela joined Mouloudia for three seasons who managed to redeem his letter of release. According to several consistent sources, the amount of the transfer would be 4 billion centimes.

On August 9, after long negotiations the algerian international Youcef Belaïli joined MC Alger for two seasons, who had been without a club since April after terminating his contract with Ajaccio, Belaïli who will wear number 10 sought through his father to find a club in Europe but it was ultimately in Algeria that he bounced around for 8 years. Belaïli signs contract with the highest salary ever received by a player in Ligue 1, sources close to the matter assure that the two parties had agreed that the monthly salary would be around 1.5 billion with an advance of 8 months. On August 21, MC Alger signed a contract with Ivorian striker Youssouf Dao for two seasons coming from Sparta Prague. On August 30, Zakaria Naidji is officially a Mouloudia d’Alger player two days after the announcement of his departure from Stade Lavallois and signed a three-year contract.

=== Season run-in ===
MC Alger leads Ligue 1 with 27 points in 10 Ligue 1 matches, a lead of nine points over the runner-up JS Saoura. Only CR Belouizdad can get closer to five points by winning its three late matches. Belaïli, Naidji, Bayazid, and Zoungrana have been regular contributors to the current season. On January 10, 2024, MC Alger and Ooredoo have signed a sponsorship partnership for a period of two years, the signing ceremony between the president of MC Alger Mohamed Hakim Hadj Redjem and the CEO of Ooredoo Roni Tohme took place in the presence of several figures from the capital club including former players Omar Betrouni and Ali Bencheikh, this is the second time they have united through a sponsorship contract after that of the 2018–2020 period.

== Squad list ==
Players and squad numbers last updated on 5 July 2024.
Note: Flags indicate national team as has been defined under FIFA eligibility rules. Players may hold more than one non-FIFA nationality.

| No. | Nat. | Name | Position | Date of birth (age) | Signed from | Signed in | Contract ends | Transfer fees | Apps | Goals |
Goalkeepers
| 1 | (Algeria) | Abdelatif Ramdane | GK | 19 May 2001 (aged 22) | (Algeria) JS Kabylie | 2022 | 2025 | | 16 | 0 |
| 2 | (Algeria) | Seifeddine Belkhir | GK | 21 January 2001 (aged 22) | (Algeria) Youth system | | 2028 | Academy Player | 1 | 0 |
| 16 | (Algeria) | Oussama Litim | GK | 3 June 1990 (aged 33) | (Saudi Arabia) Al-Ain | 2021 | 2026 | Free transfer | 45 | 0 |
Defenders
| 4 | (Algeria) | Djamel Benlamri | CB | 25 December 1989 (aged 33) | (United Arab Emirates) Al-Wasl | 2023 | 2025 | Free transfer | 27 | 0 |
| 5 | (Algeria) | Ayoub Abdellaoui (C.) | CB | 16 February 1993 (aged 30) | (Saudi Arabia) Ettifaq FC | 2022 | 2026 | Free transfer | 59 | 4 |
| 14 | (Algeria) | Hamza Mouali | LB | 16 January 1998 (aged 25) | (France) Stade Lavallois | 2023 | 2026 | | 38 | 0 |
| 17 | (Algeria) | Kamel Hamidi | RB | May 1, 1996 (aged 27) | (Algeria) MC Oran | 2021 | 2025 | | 82 | 1 |
| 19 | (Algeria) | Ayoub Ghezala | CB | December 6, 1995 (aged 27) | (Algeria) USM Annaba | 2021 | 2026 | | 80 | 2 |
| 20 | (Algeria) | Réda Halaïmia | RB | August 28, 1996 (aged 27) | (Belgium) Beerschot | 2022 | 2026 | Free transfer | 60 | 1 |
| 27 | (Algeria) | Abdelkader Menezla | CB | January 6, 2001 (aged 22) | (Algeria) USM Bel Abbès | 2022 | 2026 | | 19 | 0 |
Midfielders
| 3 | (Algeria) | Massinissa Benchelouche | MF | 11 October 2001 (aged 21) | (Algeria) Youth system | 2023 | 2025 | Academy Player | 0 | 0 |
| 6 | (Algeria) | Mohamed Benkhemassa | DM | 28 June 1993 (aged 30) | (Egypt) Ismaily SC | 2023 | 2027 | Free transfer | 37 | 1 |
| 8 | (Algeria) | Feth-Allah Tahar | RW | 22 January 1994 (aged 29) | (Algeria) ASO Chlef | 2021 | 2026 | | 84 | 2 |
| 12 | (Ivory Coast) | Mohamed Zougrana | DM | 29 October 2001 (aged 21) | (Ivory Coast) ASEC Mimosas | 2023 | 2028 | 300,000 € | 34 | 4 |
| 13 | (Algeria) | Dalil Hassen Khodja | MF | 3 April 1999 (aged 24) | (Algeria) ES Ben Aknoun | 2023 | 2027 | | 18 | 0 |
| 15 | (Algeria) | Ammar El Orfi | CM | 3 November 1998 (aged 24) | (Algeria) NC Magra | 2023 | 2025 | Free transfer | 9 | 0 |
| 21 | (Algeria) | Larbi Tabti | AM | 23 April 1993 (aged 30) | Free agent | 2024 | 2026 | Free transfer | 16 | 0 |
| 22 | (Algeria) | Khalid Dahmani | MF | 25 November 1999 (aged 23) | (Algeria) ASO Chlef | 2022 | 2026 | | 29 | 0 |
| 25 | (Algeria) | Badreddine Touki | DM | 25 September 1999 (aged 23) | (Algeria) WA Boufarik | 2021 | 2026 | | 60 | 0 |
| 26 | (Algeria) | Moundhir Bouzekri | MF | 16 December 2001 (aged 21) | (Algeria) Youth system | 2022 | 2026 | Academy Player | 17 | 1 |
Forwards
| 7 | (Algeria) | Sofiane Bayazid | FW | 16 November 1996 (aged 26) | (Algeria) USM Khenchela | 2023 | 2026 | 50,000,000 DA | 34 | 10 |
| 9 | (Ivory Coast) | Romaric Ouattara | FW | 14 October 2004 (aged 19) | (Ivory Coast) Stade d'Abidjan | 2024 | 2028 | Undisclosed | 8 | 2 |
| 10 | (Algeria) | Youcef Belaïli | FW | 14 March 1992 (aged 31) | (France) Ajaccio | 2023 | 2025 | Free transfer | 26 | 16 |
| 11 | (Ivory Coast) | Youssouf Dao | FW | 5 March 1998 (aged 25) | (Czech Republic) Sparta Prague B | 2023 | 2025 | | 15 | 1 |
| 18 | (Algeria) | Khayreddine Merzougui | FW | 16 August 1992 (aged 31) | (Algeria) CR Belouizdad | 2022 | 2024 | Free transfer | 48 | 15 |
| 24 | (Algeria) | Zakaria Naidji | FW | 19 January 1995 (aged 28) | (France) Stade Lavallois | 2023 | 2026 | 200,000 € | 34 | 12 |

== Transfers ==
=== In ===
==== Summer ====
| Date | Pos | Player | Moving from | Fee | Source |
|---|---|---|---|---|---|
| 16 July 2023 | FW | (Algeria) Ibrahim Morsli | ASO Chlef | Loan return | |
| 19 July 2023 | MF | (Ivory Coast) Mohamed Zougrana | (Ivory Coast) ASEC Mimosas | 300,000 € | |
| 20 July 2023 | DF | (Algeria) Djamel Benlamri | (United Arab Emirates) Al-Wasl | Free transfer | |
| 27 July 2023 | FW | (Algeria) Sofiane Bayazid | USM Khenchela | Undisclosed | |
| 9 August 2023 | FW | (Algeria) Youcef Belaïli | (France) Ajaccio | Free transfer | |
| 14 August 2023 | MF | (Algeria) Dalil Hassen Khodja | ES Ben Aknoun | Free transfer | |
| 17 August 2023 | MF | (Algeria) Mehdi Zerkane | (France) Nîmes Olympique | Free transfer | |
| 19 August 2023 | MF | (Algeria) Ammar El Orfi | NC Magra | Free transfer | |
| 21 August 2023 | FW | (Ivory Coast) Youssouf Dao | (Czech Republic) Sparta Prague B | Free transfer | |
| 30 August 2023 | FW | (Algeria) Zakaria Naidji | (France) Stade Lavallois | Free transfer | |

==== Winter ====
| Date | Pos | Player | Moving from | Fee | Source |
|---|---|---|---|---|---|
| 20 January 2024 | FW | (Ivory Coast) Romaric Ouattara | (Ivory Coast) Stade d'Abidjan | Undisclosed | |
| 4 February 2024 | MF | (Algeria) Larbi Tabti | Free agent | Free transfer | |

=== Out ===
==== Summer ====
| Date | Pos | Player | Moving to | Fee | Source |
|---|---|---|---|---|---|
| 9 June 2023 | GK | (Algeria) Farid Chaâl | (Saudi Arabia) Al-Najma | Free transfer | |
| 17 June 2023 | DF | (Algeria) Boualem Mesmoudi | Free agent | Free transfer | |
| 18 June 2023 | DF | (Algeria) Houari Ferhani | Free agent | Free transfer | |
| 18 July 2023 | DF | (Algeria) Aziz Benabdi | Free agent | Free transfer | |
| 10 August 2023 | FW | (Algeria) Abdelmalek Oukil | ES Sétif | Loan | |
| 16 August 2023 | FW | (Algeria) Ibrahim Morsli | Free agent | Free transfer | |
| 21 August 2023 | FW | (Ghana) Joseph Esso | Free agent | Free transfer | |
| 27 August 2023 | FW | (Algeria) Ramzi Haif | US Souf | Free transfer | |
| 6 September 2023 | FW | (Madagascar) Razafindranaivo Koloina | Unattached | Free transfer (Released) | |

==== Winter ====
| Date | Pos | Player | Moving to | Fee | Source |
|---|---|---|---|---|---|
| 11 January 2024 | FW | (Algeria) Ali Haroun | Free agent | Free transfer (Released) | |
| 31 January 2024 | FW | (Algeria) Chouaib Debbih | Free agent | Free transfer (Released) | |
| 5 February 2024 | MF | (Algeria) Mehdi Zerkane | Free agent | Free transfer (Released) | |

=== New contracts ===
| No. | Pos | Player | Contract length | Contract end | Date | Source |
|---|---|---|---|---|---|---|
| 5 | DF | Ayoub Abdellaoui | 2 years | 2026 | 19 December 2023 | |
| 20 | DF | Réda Halaïmia | 2 years | 2026 | 20 December 2023 | |
| 6 | MF | Mohamed Benkhemassa | 2 years | 2027 | 20 December 2023 | |
| 12 | MF | Mohamed Zoungrana | 1 year | 2028 | 20 December 2023 | |

== Pre-season and friendlies ==
| 29 July 2023 Friendly | Stade Lavallois (France) | 1–1 | (Algeria) MC Alger | Laval |
| 19:00 UTC+2 | | Report | | Stadium: Stade Francis Le Basser |

| 21 August 2023 Friendly | MC Alger (Algeria) | 4–1 (Note: The match was played in three halves of 30 minutes each.) | (France) ES Nanterre |
| | Merzougui; Benhaoua; Dao | Report |

| 23 August 2023 Friendly | MC Alger (Algeria) | 5–1 | (France) Stade Lavallois U21 |
| | Belaïli 6' (pen.), 48'; Merzougui 21'; Bayazid 76'; Touki 79' | Report |

| 10 September 2023 Friendly | MC Alger | 2–0 | NA Hussein Dey | Dar El Beïda |
| | Naidji 17'; Belaïli 90+3' (pen.) | Report | | Stadium: Omar Benrabah Stadium |

== Competitions ==
=== Overview ===
| Competition | Record | | | | | | | | Started round | Final position / round | First match | Last match |
| Competition | G | W | D | L | GF | GA | GD | Win % | Started round | Final position / round | First match | Last match |
|---|---|---|---|---|---|---|---|---|---|---|---|---|
| Ligue 1 | 30 | 19 | 8 | 3 | 55 | 20 | +35 | 63.33 | —N/a | Winners | 16 September 2023 | 14 June 2024 |
| Algerian Cup | 6 | 5 | 0 | 1 | 12 | 4 | +8 | 83.33 | Round of 64 | Runners-up | 2 February 2024 | 5 July 2024 |
| Total | 36 | 24 | 8 | 4 | 67 | 24 | +43 | 66.67 | | | | |

Updated to match played 5 July 2024
Source: Competitions

=== Ligue 1 ===
==== League table ====
| Pos | Team | Pld | W | D | L | GF | GA | GD | Pts | Qualification or relegation |
|---|---|---|---|---|---|---|---|---|---|---|
| 1 | MC Alger (C) | 30 | 19 | 8 | 3 | 55 | 20 | +35 | 65 | Qualification for CAF Champions League |
| 2 | CR Belouizdad | 30 | 15 | 8 | 7 | 37 | 20 | +17 | 53 | Qualification for CAF Champions League |
| 3 | CS Constantine | 30 | 15 | 8 | 7 | 46 | 30 | +16 | 53 | Qualification for CAF Confederation Cup |
| 4 | USM Alger | 30 | 15 | 4 | 11 | 40 | 32 | +8 | 49 | Qualification for CAF Confederation Cup |
| 5 | ES Sétif | 30 | 14 | 6 | 10 | 37 | 37 | 0 | 48 | |

Source: the-sports.org
Rules for classification: 1) points; 2) head-to-head points; 3) head-to-head goal difference; 4) goal difference; 5) total goals; 6) fairplay ranking; 7) playoff.
(C) Champions

==== Results summary ====
| Overall | | | | | | | | Home | | | | | | Away | | | | | |
| Pld | W | D | L | GF | GA | GD | Pts | W | D | L | GF | GA | GD | W | D | L | GF | GA | GD |
|---|---|---|---|---|---|---|---|---|---|---|---|---|---|---|---|---|---|---|---|
| 30 | 19 | 8 | 3 | 55 | 20 | +35 | 65 | 13 | 2 | 0 | 40 | 9 | +31 | 6 | 6 | 3 | 15 | 11 | +4 |

Last updated: 14 June 2024.
Source: Competitive matches

==== Results by round ====
| Round | 1 | 2 | 3 | 4 | 5 | 6 | 7 | 8 | 9 | 10 | 11 | 12 | 13 | 14 | 15 | 16 | 17 | 18 | 19 | 20 | 21 | 22 | 23 | 24 | 25 | 26 | 27 | 28 | 29 | 30 |
|---|---|---|---|---|---|---|---|---|---|---|---|---|---|---|---|---|---|---|---|---|---|---|---|---|---|---|---|---|---|---|
| Ground | H | A | H | H | A | H | A | H | A | H | A | H | A | H | A | A | H | A | A | H | A | H | A | H | A | H | A | H | A | H |
| Result | W | L | W | W | W | W | W | W | W | W | D | D | D | W | W | W | W | D | L | W | W | W | W | W | D | W | D | D | L | W |
| Position | 1 | 6 | 4 | 1 | 1 | 1 | 1 | 1 | 1 | 1 | 1 | 1 | 1 | 1 | 1 | 1 | 1 | 1 | 1 | 1 | 1 | 1 | 1 | 1 | 1 | 1 | 1 | 1 | 1 | 1 |

Updated to match(es) played on 14 June 2024. Source: Competitive matches
A = Away; H = Home; W = Win; D = Draw; L = Loss

==== Matches ====
The league fixtures were announced on 24 August 2023.

All times are local, WAT (UTC+1).

Win Draw Loss Postponed

| 16 September 2023 Round 1 | MC Alger | 4–0 | ES Ben Aknoun | Dar El Beïda |
| 16:00 | Bayazid 11'; Benkhemassa 24'; Abdellaoui (yellow card) 56'; Belaïli 71'; Merzougui 90' | Report | Hadji (yellow card) 39'; Meklouche (yellow card) 58' | Stadium: Omar Benrabah Stadium; Referee: Abdelmoumen Touabti |

| 22 September 2023 Round 2 | CS Constantine | 2–1 | MC Alger | Constantine |
| 16:00 | Messibah (yellow card) 7'; Zaalani 30'; Dib 82' (pen.) (yellow card) 82'; Boussouf (yellow card) 88' | Report | Ghezala (yellow card) 13'; Belaïli 17' (yellow card) 75'; Benkhemassa (yellow card) 24'; Tahar (yellow card) 56' | Stadium: Ramadane Ben Abdelmalek Stadium; Referee: Houssam Benyahia |

| 30 September 2023 Round 3 | MC Alger | 2–0 | MC El Bayadh | Dar El Beïda |
| 15:45 | Dao 13'; Belaïli (yellow card) 38' (goal) 73' | Report | Kouar (yellow card) 45+1'; Belalem (yellow card) 72'; Belaribi (yellow card) 86'; Bahoussi (yellow card) 89' | Stadium: Omar Benrabah Stadium; Referee: Ali Nader |

| 6 October 2023 Round 4 | MC Alger | 5–3 | ES Sétif | Dar El Beïda |
| 15:45 | Bayazid 10', 56' (yellow card) 19'; Halaïmia 25'; Belaïli 53'; Merzougui 90+2' | Report | Zaitri (yellow card) 15'; Diarra (yellow card) 24'; Zeghad 29'; Oukil 42'; Bouchama 80' | Stadium: Omar Benrabah Stadium; Referee: Nabil Boukhalfa |

| 11 November 2023 Round 5 | ASO Chlef | 0–1 | MC Alger | Chlef |
| 17:00 | Mohutsiwa (yellow card) 21'; Addadi (yellow card) 66'; Souibaâh (yellow card) 90+3'; Alili (yellow card) 90+3' | Report | Belaïli 3' (pen.); Benkhemassa (yellow card) 51' | Stadium: Mohamed Boumezrag Stadium; Referee: Youcef Gamouh |

| 17 November 2023 Round 6 | MC Alger | 4–0 | JS Saoura | Algiers |
| 18:00 | Naidji 19'; Belaïli 53', 90' (pen.); Zoungrana (yellow card) 64'; Merzougui 90+5' (yellow card) 90+5' | Report | Bouchiba (yellow card) 2'; Baaziz (yellow card) 79' | Stadium: Stade du 5 Juillet; Referee: Mustapha Ghorbal |

| 25 November 2023 Round 7 | US Souf | 3–4 | MC Alger | El Oued |
| 15:15 | Siab (yellow card) 20'; Djilani (yellow card) 20'; Bassou 36'; Benlamri 70' (o.g.); Lalaouna (yellow card) 72'; Belamine 90' | Report | Belaïli 8', 33', 73' (pen.); Mouali (yellow card) 26'; Naidji 31' (yellow card) 33'; Benkhemassa (yellow card) 42'; Litim (yellow card) 90+3' | Stadium: 1 November 1954 Stadium; Referee: Rafik Aouina |

| 1 December 2023 Round 8 | MC Alger | 4–0 | NC Magra | Algiers |
| 16:45 | Bayazid 6', 37'; Naidji 23'; Benkhemassa (yellow card) 27'; Merzougui 81' | Report | Ghanmi (yellow card) 74' | Stadium: Stade du 5 Juillet; Referee: Houssam Benyahia |

| 7 December 2023 Round 9 | Paradou AC | 0–1 | MC Alger | Algiers |
| 19:00 | Boukerma (yellow card) 82'; Bendouma (yellow card) 90+3' | Report | Mouali (yellow card) 23'; Benkhemassa (yellow card) 45'; Abdellaoui 54'; Halaïmia (yellow card) 90+3' | Stadium: Stade du 5 Juillet; Referee: Lahlou Benbraham |

| 16 December 2023 Round 10 | MC Alger | 3–0 | USM Khenchela | Algiers |
| 18:00 | Naidji 4', 49', 80'; Belaïli (yellow card) 84' | Report | | Stadium: Stade du 5 Juillet; Referee: Nabil Boukhalfa |

| 29 December 2023 Round 11 | USM Alger | 0–0 | MC Alger | Algiers |
| 18:00 | Benzaza (yellow card) 32'; Embarek (yellow card) 56'; Benbot (yellow card) 88'; Dehiri (yellow card) 90+1' | Report | Belaïli (yellow card) 9'; Zougrana (yellow card) 21' | Stadium: Stade du 5 Juillet; Referee: Mustapha Ghorbal |
Note: The match was originally to be played on 25 December 2023, but it was postponed due to the fatal traffic accident by MC El Bayadh.

| 6 January 2024 Round 12 | MC Alger | 1–1 | JS Kabylie | Algiers |
| 18:00 | Dao (yellow card) 31'; Naidji 38'; Hassen Khodja (yellow card) 78'; Benhaoua (yellow card) 87'; El Orfi (yellow card) 88' | Report | Boukhanchouche (yellow card) 32'; Matouti 89' | Stadium: Stade du 5 Juillet; Referee: Abdelmoumen Touabti |

| 14 January 2024 Round 13 | CR Belouizdad | 0–0 | MC Alger | Algiers |
| 19:00 | Bouras (yellow card) 26'; Benguit (yellow card) 35'; Keddad (yellow card) 58'; Jallow (yellow card) 88' | Report | Zougrana (yellow card) 46'; Halaïmia (yellow card) 76' | Stadium: Stade du 5 Juillet; Referee: Houssam Benyahia |

| 19 January 2024 Round 14 | MC Alger | 1–0 | US Biskra | Algiers |
| 18:00 | Merzougui (yellow card) 59'; Boucherit 78'; Halaïmia (yellow card) 79'; Mouali (yellow card) 90+3' | Report | Khoualed (yellow card) 42' | Stadium: Stade du 5 Juillet; Referee: Yahia Dahar |

| 26 January 2024 Round 15 | MC Oran | 0–2 | MC Alger | Oran |
| 17:00 | Nehari (yellow card) 61' | Report | Bayazid 63'; Mouali (yellow card) 79'; Belharrane 85' (o.g.) | Stadium: Ahmed Zabana Stadium; Referee: Abdelali Ibrir |

| 16 February 2024 Round 17 | MC Alger | 2–0 | CS Constantine | Algiers |
| 18:00 | Belaïli (yellow card) 21'; Naidji 42'; Mouali (yellow card) 81' (yellow-red card) 90+4'; Merzougui 88'; Litim (yellow card) 90+2' | Report | Meddahi (yellow card) 35'; Dib (yellow card) 44'; Zaalani (yellow card) 90+4' | Stadium: Stade du 5 Juillet; Referee: Billel Bendjahene |

| 24 February 2024 Round 18 | MC El Bayadh | 0–0 | MC Alger | El Bayadh |
| 16:00 | Messadi (yellow card) 55'; Khemaissia (yellow card) 83'; Bahoussi (yellow card) 87' | Report | Bayazid (yellow card) 33'; Abdellaoui (yellow card) 64'; Litim (yellow card) 90+3' | Stadium: Zakaria Medjdoub Stadium; Referee: Youcef Gamouh |

| 2 March 2024 Round 19 | ES Sétif | 1–0 | MC Alger | Sétif |
| 18:00 | Benkhelifa 20' (yellow card) 45+5'; Nouri (yellow card) 37'; Lahmeri (yellow card) 80' | Report | Tabti (yellow card) 39'; Benkhemassa (yellow card) 45+5'; Belaïli (yellow card) 52' (yellow-red card) 84' | Stadium: 8 May 1945 Stadium; Referee: Mohamed Saidi |

| 14 March 2024 Round 20 | MC Alger | 6–3 | ASO Chlef | Algiers |
| 22:00 | Abdellaoui 38'; Benlamri (yellow card) 40'; Zougrana 48' (yellow card) 74'; Naidji 50', 76'; Bayazid 55'; Merzougui 90' | Report | Hamra 13'; Aliane 40'; Bourdim 45+11'; Achour (yellow card) 56'; Agbagno (yellow card) 81' | Stadium: Stade du 5 Juillet; Referee: Mustapha Ghorbal |

| 20 March 2024 Round 16 | ES Ben Aknoun | 2–3 | MC Alger | Dar El Beïda |
| 15:30 | Benabdi (yellow card) 12'; Daoud (yellow card) 37'; Zemmamouche (yellow card) 39'; Haddouche 59'; Hachoud 76' | Report | Bayazid 39' (pen.); Dahmani (yellow card) 45+1'; Bencherifa 48' (o.g.); Ghezala 70'; Merzougui (yellow card) 79' | Stadium: Omar Benrabah Stadium; Referee: Lahlou Benbraham |

| 25 March 2024 Round 21 | JS Saoura | 0–1 | MC Alger | Béchar |
| 15:30 | Baaziz (yellow card) 47'; Mebarki 47'; Saâd (yellow card) 89' | Report | Belaïli 29'; Benkhemassa (yellow card) 53'; Abdellaoui (yellow card) 85'; Naidji 89' | Stadium: 20 August 1955 Stadium; Referee: Nabil Boukhalfa |

| 5 April 2024 Round 22 | MC Alger | 3–0 | US Souf | Algiers |
| 22:00 | Merzougui 45+3'; Zougrana 67'; Ouattara 86' | Report | | Stadium: Stade du 5 Juillet; Referee: Abderahmane Sahraoui |

| 19 April 2024 Round 23 | NC Magra | 0–0 | MC Alger | Magra |
| 16:00 | | Report | | Stadium: Boucheligue Brothers Stadium; Referee: Abdelmoumen Touabti |

| 27 April 2024 Round 24 | MC Alger | 1–0 | Paradou AC | Algiers |
| 20:00 | Naidji 79' | Report | | Stadium: Stade du 5 Juillet; Referee: Lyes Bekouassa |

| 11 May 2024 Round 25 | USM Khenchela | 1–1 | MC Alger | Khenchela |
| 17:00 | Sameur 12' (pen.) | Report | Belaïli 22' | Stadium: Amar Hamam Stadium; Referee: Houssam Benyahia |

| 17 May 2024 Round 26 | MC Alger | 1–0 | USM Alger | Algiers |
| 18:00 | Zougrana 23' | Report | | Stadium: Stade du 5 Juillet; Referee: Nabil Boukhalfa |

| 26 May 2024 Round 27 | JS Kabylie | 1–1 | MC Alger | Tizi Ouzou |
| 16:45 | Berkane 7' | Report | Merzougui 84' (pen.) | Stadium: 1 November 1954 Stadium; Referee: Fodil Oukil |

| 7 June 2024 Round 28 | MC Alger | 0–0 | CR Belouizdad | Baraki |
| 16:45 | | Report | | Stadium: Nelson Mandela Stadium; Referee: Rafik Aouina |

| 11 June 2024 Round 29 | US Biskra | 1–0 | MC Alger | Biskra |
| 16:45 | Zeghnoun 2' | Report | | Stadium: 18 February Stadium; Referee: Alaa Bouab |

| 14 June 2024 Round 30 | MC Alger | 3–2 | MC Oran | Baraki |
| 18:00 | Belaïli 4', 52' (pen.); Merzougui 48' | Report | Bengrina 11'; Dahar 82' | Stadium: Nelson Mandela Stadium; Referee: Tahar Boudjemaa |

=== Algerian Cup ===
| 2 February 2024 Round of 64 | NRB Teleghma | 0–2 | MC Alger | Mila |
| 14:30 | | Report | Bayazid 45'; Merzougui 87' | Stadium: Belkacem Belaid Stadium; Referee: Mohamed Saidi |
Note: MC Alger Lineups: Ramdane, Abdellaoui, Hamidi, Ghezala, Halaïmia, Zougrana (substituted off) 85' (El Orfi (substituted on) 85'), Hassen Khodja (substituted off) 85' (Menezla (substituted on) 85'), Dahmani (substituted off) 70' (Boucherit (substituted on) 70'), Belaïli, Naidji, Bayazid (substituted off) 70' (Merzougui (substituted on) 70').

| 9 March 2024 Round of 32 | CR Zaouia | 1–4 | MC Alger | Blida |
| 15:00 | Chihane 21' (pen.) | Report | Naidji 32'; Merzougui 57' (pen.); Boucherit 78', 88' | Stadium: Mustapha Tchaker Stadium; Referee: Akram Mechairia |
Note: MC Alger Lineups: Ramdane, Hamidi, Mouali, Benlamri, Ghezala (substituted off) 86' (Menezla, (substituted on) 86'), Benkhemassa, Zougrana (substituted off) 80' (Touki, (substituted on) 80'), Naidji, Tahar (substituted off) 79' (Tabti, (substituted on) 79'), Merzougui (substituted off) 70' (Romaric, (substituted on) 70'), Bayazid (substituted off) 70' (Boucherit, (substituted on) 70').

| 30 March 2024 Round of 16 | USM Khenchela | 1–2 | MC Alger | Khenchela |
| 15:30 | Sameur 55' (pen.) | Report | Belaïli 11' (pen.); Bayazid 45' | Stadium: Amar Hamam Stadium; Referee: Youcef Gamouh |
Note: MC Alger Lineups: Ramdane, Halaïmia, Mouali, Benlamri, Ghezala, Benkhemassa, Zougrana, Tahar (substituted off) 65' (Menezla, (substituted on) 65'), Belaïli (substituted off) 90+2' (Merzougui (substituted on) 90+2'), Naidji (substituted off) 79' (Boucherit, (substituted on) 79'), Bayazid (substituted off) 79' (Hamidi, (substituted on) 79').

| 14 April 2024 Quarter-finals | WA Tlemcen | 0–2 | MC Alger | Algiers |
| 20:30 | | Report | Belaïli 45' (pen.); Ouattara 79' | Stadium: Stade du 5 Juillet; Referee: Ghada Mehat |
Note: MC Alger Lineups: Ramdane, Abdellaoui, Ghezala, Hamidi, Mouali, Benkhemassa (substituted off) 87' (Benlamri, (substituted on) 87'), Zougrana (substituted off) 84' (El Orfi (substituted on) 84'), Tahar (substituted off) 71' (Bayazid (substituted on) 71'), Belaïli, Naidji (substituted off) 87' (Tabti, (substituted on) 87'), Merzougui (substituted off) 71' (Ouattara (substituted on) 71').

| 23 April 2024 Semi-finals | MC Alger | 2–1 (a.e.t.) | CS Constantine | Oran |
| 21:00 | Zougrana 78'; Abdellaoui 115' | Report | Madani 19' | Stadium: Miloud Hadefi Stadium; Attendance: 0 (close doors); Referee: Lahlou Benbraham |
Note: MC Alger Lineups: Ramdane, Abdellaoui, Hamidi (substituted off) 109' (Halaïmia (substituted on) 109'), Ghezala, Mouali, Benkhemassa (substituted off) 115' (Menezla (substituted on) 115'), Zougrana (substituted off) 99' (Tabti, (substituted on) 99'), Tahar (substituted off) 46' (Boucherit (substituted on) 46'), Belaïli, Naidji (substituted off) 109' (Merzougui (substituted on) 109'), Bayazid (substituted off) 46' (Ouattara (substituted on) 46').

| 5 July 2024 Final | MC Alger | 0–1 | CR Belouizdad | Algiers |
| 17:00 | | Report | Keddad 42' | Stadium: Stade du 5 Juillet; Referee: Mustapha Ghorbal |
Note: MC Alger Lineups: Ramdane, Abdellaoui, Benlamri, Halaïmia, Mouali, Benkhemassa, Zougrana, Tabti, Belaïli, Naidji, Bayazid (substituted off) 67' (Boucherit (substituted on) 67').

== Squad information ==
=== Appearances and goals ===
As of 5 July 2024

| No. | Pos | Player | Nat | Ligue 1 | | | Algerian Cup | | | Total | | |
| No. | Pos | Player | Nat | App | St | G | App | St | G | App | St | G |
|---|---|---|---|---|---|---|---|---|---|---|---|---|
Goalkeepers
| 1 | GK | Abdelatif Ramdane | (Algeria) | 10 | 10 | 0 | 6 | 6 | 0 | 16 | 16 | 0 |
| 2 | GK | Seifeddine Belkhir | (Algeria) | 1 | 1 | 0 | 0 | 0 | 0 | 1 | 1 | 0 |
| 16 | GK | Oussama Litim | (Algeria) | 19 | 19 | 0 | 0 | 0 | 0 | 19 | 19 | 0 |
Defenders
| 4 | CB | Djamel Benlamri | (Algeria) | 23 | 20 | 0 | 4 | 3 | 0 | 27 | 23 | 0 |
| 5 | CB | Ayoub Abdellaoui | (Algeria) | 28 | 27 | 2 | 4 | 4 | 1 | 32 | 31 | 3 |
| 14 | LB | Hamza Mouali | (Algeria) | 27 | 26 | 0 | 5 | 5 | 0 | 32 | 31 | 0 |
| 17 | RB | Kamel Hamidi | (Algeria) | 15 | 7 | 0 | 5 | 4 | 0 | 20 | 11 | 0 |
| 19 | CB | Ayoub Ghezala | (Algeria) | 21 | 12 | 1 | 5 | 5 | 0 | 26 | 17 | 1 |
| 20 | RB | Réda Halaïmia | (Algeria) | 29 | 27 | 1 | 4 | 3 | 0 | 33 | 30 | 1 |
| 27 | CB | Abdelkader Menezla | (Algeria) | 7 | 1 | 0 | 4 | 0 | 0 | 11 | 1 | 0 |
Midfielders
| 3 | MF | Massinissa Benchelouche | (Algeria) | 0 | 0 | 0 | 0 | 0 | 0 | 0 | 0 | 0 |
| 6 | DM | Mohamed Benkhemassa | (Algeria) | 24 | 22 | 1 | 5 | 5 | 0 | 29 | 27 | 1 |
| 8 | AM | Feth-Allah Tahar | (Algeria) | 23 | 18 | 0 | 4 | 4 | 0 | 27 | 22 | 0 |
| 12 | DM | Mohamed Zougrana | (Ivory Coast) | 28 | 26 | 3 | 6 | 6 | 1 | 34 | 32 | 4 |
| 13 | MF | Dalil Hassen Khodja | (Algeria) | 17 | 7 | 0 | 1 | 1 | 0 | 18 | 8 | 0 |
| 15 | CM | Ammar El Orfi | (Algeria) | 7 | 1 | 0 | 2 | 0 | 0 | 9 | 1 | 0 |
| 21 | AM | Larbi Tabti | (Algeria) | 12 | 7 | 0 | 4 | 1 | 0 | 16 | 8 | 0 |
| 22 | MF | Khalid Dahmani | (Algeria) | 10 | 7 | 0 | 1 | 1 | 0 | 11 | 8 | 0 |
| 25 | MF | Badreddine Touki | (Algeria) | 12 | 4 | 0 | 1 | 0 | 0 | 13 | 4 | 0 |
| 26 | MF | Moundhir Bouzekri | (Algeria) | 1 | 1 | 0 | 0 | 0 | 0 | 1 | 1 | 0 |
| 67 | MF | Oussama Benhaoua | (Algeria) | 2 | 1 | 0 | 0 | 0 | 0 | 2 | 1 | 0 |
Forwards
| 7 | CF | Sofiane Bayazid | (Algeria) | 28 | 22 | 8 | 6 | 5 | 2 | 34 | 27 | 10 |
| 9 | FW | Romaric Ouattara | (Ivory Coast) | 5 | 3 | 1 | 3 | 0 | 1 | 8 | 3 | 2 |
| 10 | LW | Youcef Belaïli | (Algeria) | 21 | 21 | 14 | 5 | 5 | 2 | 26 | 26 | 16 |
| 11 | CF | Youssouf Dao | (Ivory Coast) | 15 | 4 | 1 | 0 | 0 | 0 | 15 | 4 | 1 |
| 18 | CF | Khayreddine Merzougui | (Algeria) | 28 | 8 | 9 | 5 | 2 | 2 | 33 | 10 | 11 |
| 24 | CF | Zakaria Naidji | (Algeria) | 28 | 27 | 11 | 6 | 6 | 1 | 34 | 33 | 12 |
| 41 | FW | Mehdi Boucherit | (Algeria) | 11 | 1 | 1 | 4 | 0 | 2 | 15 | 1 | 3 |
| | FW | Fares Belaili | (Algeria) | 2 | 0 | 0 | 0 | 0 | 0 | 2 | 0 | 0 |
Players transferred out during the season
| ~~21~~ | AM / RW | Mehdi Zerkane | (Algeria) | 3 | 0 | 0 | 0 | 0 | 0 | 3 | 0 | 0 |
| ~~9~~ | ST | Ali Haroun | (Algeria) | 1 | 0 | 0 | 0 | 0 | 0 | 1 | 0 | 0 |
| ~~23~~ | LW | Chouaib Debbih | (Algeria) | 0 | 0 | 0 | 0 | 0 | 0 | 0 | 0 | 0 |
| Total | | | | 30 | | 55 | 5 | | 12 | 35 | | 67 |

Last updated: 5 July 2024
Source: soccerway.com

=== Goalscorers ===
As of 5 July 2024

Includes all competitive matches.

| No. | Nat. | Player | Pos. | L 1 | AC | TOTAL |
|---|---|---|---|---|---|---|
| 10 | (Algeria) | Youcef Belaïli | FW | 14 | 2 | 16 |
| 24 | (Algeria) | Zakaria Naidji | FW | 11 | 1 | 12 |
| 18 | (Algeria) | Khayreddine Merzougui | FW | 9 | 2 | 11 |
| 7 | (Algeria) | Sofiane Bayazid | FW | 8 | 2 | 10 |
| 12 | (Ivory Coast) | Mohamed Zougrana | MF | 3 | 1 | 4 |
| 41 | (Algeria) | Mehdi Boucherit | FW | 1 | 2 | 3 |
| 5 | (Algeria) | Ayoub Abdellaoui | DF | 2 | 1 | 3 |
| 9 | (Ivory Coast) | Romaric Ouattara | FW | 1 | 1 | 2 |
| 6 | (Algeria) | Mohammed Benkhemassa | MF | 1 | 0 | 1 |
| 11 | (Ivory Coast) | Youssouf Dao | FW | 1 | 0 | 1 |
| 20 | (Algeria) | Réda Halaïmia | DF | 1 | 0 | 1 |
| 19 | (Algeria) | Ayoub Ghezala | DF | 1 | 0 | 1 |
| Own Goals | | | | 2 | 0 | 2 |
| Totals | | | | 55 | 12 | 67 |

=== Assists ===
As of 5 July 2024

| No. | Nat. | Player | Pos. | L 1 | AC | TOTAL |
|---|---|---|---|---|---|---|
| 10 | (Algeria) | Youcef Belaïli | FW | 12 | 2 | 14 |
| 24 | (Algeria) | Zakaria Naidji | FW | 5 | 1 | 6 |
| 11 | (Ivory Coast) | Youssouf Dao | FW | 4 | 0 | 4 |
| 8 | (Algeria) | Fethallah Tahar | MF | 3 | 0 | 3 |
| 20 | (Algeria) | Réda Halaïmia | DF | 2 | 0 | 2 |
| 17 | (Algeria) | Kamel Hamidi | DF | 2 | 0 | 2 |
| 12 | (Ivory Coast) | Mohamed Zougrana | MF | 1 | 1 | 2 |
| 6 | (Algeria) | Mohamed Benkhemassa | MF | 1 | 0 | 1 |
| 67 | (Algeria) | Oussama Benhaoua | MF | 1 | 0 | 1 |
| 7 | (Algeria) | Sofiane Bayazid | FW | 1 | 0 | 1 |
| 14 | (Algeria) | Hamza Mouali | DF | 1 | 0 | 1 |
| 9 | (Ivory Coast) | Romaric Ouattara | FW | 0 | 1 | 1 |
| 41 | (Algeria) | Mehdi Boucherit | FW | 0 | 1 | 1 |
| Totals | | | | 31 | 6 | 37 |

=== Penalties ===
| Date | Nation | Name | Opponent | Scored? |
|---|---|---|---|---|
| 11 November 2023 | (Algeria) | Youcef Belaïli | ASO Chlef | ✓ |
| 17 November 2023 | (Algeria) | Youcef Belaïli | JS Saoura | ✓ |
| 25 November 2023 | (Algeria) | Youcef Belaïli | US Souf | ✓ |
| 9 March 2024 | (Algeria) | Khayreddine Merzougui | CR Zaouia | ✓ |
| 30 March 2024 | (Algeria) | Youcef Belaïli | USM Khenchela | ✓ |
| 14 April 2024 | (Algeria) | Youcef Belaïli | WA Tlemcen | ✓ |
| 26 May 2024 | (Algeria) | Khayreddine Merzougui | JS Kabylie | ✓ |
| 14 June 2024 | (Algeria) | Youcef Belaïli | MC Oran | ✓ |

=== Clean sheets ===
As of 5 July 2024

Includes all competitive matches.

| | | | | | Clean sheets | | |
| No. | Nat | Name | GP | GA | L 1 | AC | Total |
|---|---|---|---|---|---|---|---|
| 1 | (Algeria) | Abdelatif Ramdane | 16 | 8 | 8 | 2 | 10 |
| 2 | (Algeria) | Seifeddine Belkhir | 1 | 1 | 0 | 0 | 0 |
| 16 | (Algeria) | Oussama Litim | 19 | 16 | 11 | 0 | 11 |
| | | TOTALS | | 25 | 19 | 2 | 21 |
